= List of football clubs in Iraq =

This is a list of football clubs that compete within the leagues and divisions of the Iraqi football league system during the 2023–24 season.

== List of Leagues and Divisions ==
- Stars League (Level 1)
- Premier Division League (Level 2)
- First Division League (Level 3)
- Second Division League (Level 4)

== Alphabetical list ==
The divisions are correct for the 2023–24 season.

=== A ===
Club	Division	Level	Location	Region
A'ali Al-Furat SC	Second Division League	4	Al-Anbar	Western Region
Abi Al-Khaseeb SC	Second Division League	4	Basra	Southern Region
Abnaa Al-Madina SC	Second Division League	4	Baghdad	Baghdad Region
Abu Ghraib SC			Baghdad	Baghdad Region
Afak SC	Premier Division League	2	Al-Qādisiyyah	Middle Euphrates Region
Ain Al-Tamur SC	Second Division League	4	Karbala	Middle Euphrates Region
Akkad SC	Second Division League	4	Dhi Qar	Southern Region
Al-Adala SC	Second Division League	4	Baghdad	Baghdad Region
Al-Adhamiya SC			Baghdad	Baghdad Region
Al-Ahrar SC	Second Division League	4	Wasit	Southern Region
Al-Ain SC	Second Division League	4	Baghdad	Baghdad Region
Al-Alam SC	First Division League	3	Saladin	Western Region
Al-Amara SC	Second Division League	4	Maysan	Southern Region
Al-Amwaj Al-Mosuli SC	First Division League	3	Nineveh	Northern Region
Al-Anbar SC	Second Division League	4	Al-Anbar	Western Region
Al-Atheer SC	Second Division League	4	Baghdad	Baghdad Region
Al-Aziziyah SC	Division Three	4	Wasit	Southern Region
Al-Bahri SC	Premier Division League	2	Basra	Southern Region
Al-Baiyaa SC	Second Division League	4	Baghdad	Baghdad Region
Al-Basra SC			Basra	Southern Region
Al-Bathaa SC	Second Division League	4	Dhi Qar	Southern Region
Al Bdeir SC	First Division League	3	Al-Qādisiyyah	Middle Euphrates Region
Al-Daghara SC	Second Division League	4	Al-Qādisiyyah	Middle Euphrates Region
Al-Dair SC	Second Division League	4	Basra	Southern Region
Al-Dhafar SC			Baghdad	Baghdad Region
Al-Dhuluiya SC	Second Division League	4	Saladin	Western Region
Al-Dibis SC	Second Division League	4	Kirkuk	Northern Region
Al-Difaa Al-Jawi SC	Second Division League	4	Baghdad	Baghdad Region
Al-Difaa Al-Madani SC	Premier Division League	2	Baghdad	Baghdad Region
Al-Diwan SC			Baghdad	Baghdad Region
Al-Diwaniya SC	Premier Division League	2	Al-Qādisiyyah	Middle Euphrates Region
Al-Dujail SC	Second Division League	4	Saladin	Western Region
Al-Etisalat SC	Premier Division League	2	Baghdad	Baghdad Region
Al-Ettifaq SC			Al-Qādisiyyah	Middle Euphrates Region
Al-Fahad SC	Premier Division League	2	Al-Anbar	Western Region
Al-Falluja SC	Second Division League	4	Al-Anbar	Western Region
Al-Fatah SC			Baghdad	Baghdad Region
Al-Faw SC	Second Division League	4	Basra	Southern Region
Al-Fayhaa SC	Second Division League	4	Basra	Southern Region
Al-Fosfat SC			Al-Anbar	Western Region
Al-Fotuwa SC	Second Division League	4	Nineveh	Northern Region
Al-Furat SC	First Division League	3	Dhi Qar	Southern Region
Al-Ghadeer SC	Second Division League	4	Karbala	Middle Euphrates Region
Al-Ghadhriya SC			Karbala	Middle Euphrates Region
Al-Gharraf SC	Premier Division League	2	Dhi Qar	Southern Region
Al-Habbaniya SC	Second Division League	4	Al-Anbar	Western Region
Al-Hadbaa SC			Nineveh	Northern Region
Al-Hamza SC	Second Division League	4	Al-Qādisiyyah	Middle Euphrates Region
Al-Hasanain SC			Baghdad	Baghdad Region
Al-Hashd Al-Shaabi SC	First Division League	3	Baghdad	Baghdad Region
Al-Hashimiya SC			Babil	Middle Euphrates Region
Al-Hawija SC	First Division League	3	Kirkuk	Northern Region
Al-Hay SC			Wasit	Southern Region
Al-Hilla SC	Second Division League	4	Babil	Middle Euphrates Region
Al-Hindiya SC	Second Division League	4	Karbala	Middle Euphrates Region
Al-Hudood SC	Stars League	1	Baghdad	Baghdad Region
Al-Hurr SC	Second Division League	4	Karbala	Middle Euphrates Region
Al-Hurriya SC			Baghdad	Baghdad Region
Al-Hussein SC	Premier Division League	2	Baghdad	Baghdad Region
Al-Husseiniya SC			Karbala	Middle Euphrates Region
Al-Iraq SC			Karbala	Middle Euphrates Region
Al-Ishaqi SC			Saladin	Western Region
Al-Iskan SC			Baghdad	Baghdad Region
Al-Ittihad SC	Second Division League	4	Basra	Southern Region
Al-Izdihar SC			Najaf	Middle Euphrates Region
Al-Izza SC	Second Division League	4	Wasit	Southern Region
Al-Jaish SC	Second Division League	4	Baghdad	Baghdad Region
Al-Jamahir SC	Second Division League	4	Karbala	Middle Euphrates Region
Al-Jamiea SC			Baghdad	Baghdad Region
Al-Jawhara SC	First Division League	3	Babil	Middle Euphrates Region
Al-Jihad SC	Second Division League	4	Wasit	Southern Region
Al-Jinsiya SC			Baghdad	Baghdad Region
Al-Jolan SC	Premier Division League	2	Al-Anbar	Western Region
Al-Junoob SC	Second Division League	4	Basra	Southern Region
Al-Kadhimiya SC	First Division League	3	Baghdad	Baghdad Region
Al-Kahrabaa SC	Stars League	1	Baghdad	Baghdad Region
Al-Karkh SC	Stars League	1	Baghdad	Baghdad Region
Al-Karma SC	Premier Division League	2	Al-Anbar	Western Region
Al-Khairat SC			Karbala	Middle Euphrates Region
Al-Khaleej Al-Arabi SC	Second Division League	4	Basra	Southern Region
Al-Khalis SC	First Division League	3	Diyala	Western Region
Al-Khawarnaq SC			Najaf	Middle Euphrates Region
Al-Khidhir SC	First Division League	3	Al-Muthanna	Middle Euphrates Region
Al-Khor SC	Second Division League	4	Basra	Southern Region
Al-Khutoot Al-Jawiya SC	First Division League	3	Baghdad	Baghdad Region
Al-Kifl SC	First Division League	3	Babil	Middle Euphrates Region
Al-Kufa SC	Premier Division League	2	Najaf	Middle Euphrates Region
Al-Kut SC	First Division League	3	Wasit	Southern Region
Al-Madain SC			Baghdad	Baghdad Region
Al-Mahanawiya SC	Second Division League	4	Al-Qādisiyyah	Middle Euphrates Region
Al-Mahawil SC	Second Division League	4	Babil	Middle Euphrates Region
Al-Mahmoudiya SC			Baghdad	Baghdad Region
Al-Maimouna SC	Second Division League	4	Maysan	Southern Region
Al-Mansouriya SC	Second Division League	4	Diyala	Western Region
Al-Maqal SC	Second Division League	4	Basra	Southern Region
Al-Mashroua SC	Second Division League	4	Babil	Middle Euphrates Region
Al-Maslaha SC			Baghdad	Baghdad Region
Al-Midaina SC	Second Division League	4	Basra	Southern Region
Al-Midhatiya SC	Second Division League	4	Babil	Middle Euphrates Region
Al-Minaa SC	Stars League	1	Basra	Southern Region
Al-Miqdadiya SC	Second Division League	4	Diyala	Western Region
Al-Mithaq SC	Second Division League	4	Baghdad	Baghdad Region
Al-Mohandessin SC			Baghdad	Baghdad Region
Al-Mosul SC	First Division League	3	Nineveh	Northern Region
Al-Munshaat wal-Shakhsiyat SC			Baghdad	Baghdad Region
Al-Muroor SC			Baghdad	Baghdad Region
Al-Musayyib SC			Babil	Middle Euphrates Region
Al-Mustaqbal Al-Mushriq SC	Second Division League	4	Nineveh	Northern Region
Al-Muthanna SC			Al-Muthanna	Middle Euphrates Region
Al-Muwafaqiya SC	Second Division League	4	Wasit	Southern Region
Al-Naft SC	Stars League	1	Baghdad	Baghdad Region
Al-Nahdha SC			Baghdad	Baghdad Region
Al-Nahrain SC	Second Division League	4	Wasit	Southern Region
Al-Najaf SC	Stars League	1	Najaf	Middle Euphrates Region
Al-Najda SC			Baghdad	Baghdad Region
Al-Najma SC	Second Division League	4	Al-Qādisiyyah	Middle Euphrates Region
Al-Nasiriya SC	Premier Division League	2	Dhi Qar	Southern Region
Al-Nassr SC	Second Division League	4	Dhi Qar	Southern Region
Al-Nassr wal-Salam SC			Baghdad	Baghdad Region
Al-Neel SC	Second Division League	4	Babil	Middle Euphrates Region
Al-Noor SC	Second Division League	4	Basra	Southern Region
Al-Numaniya SC	First Division League	3	Wasit	Southern Region
Al-Oloom wal-Technologia SC			Baghdad	Baghdad Region
Al-Osra SC			Karbala	Middle Euphrates Region
Al-Qasim SC	Stars League	1	Babil	Middle Euphrates Region
Al-Qurna SC	First Division League	3	Basra	Southern Region
Al-Quwa Al-Jawiya	Stars League	1	Baghdad	Baghdad Region
Al-Radd Al-Sariea SC	Second Division League	4	Baghdad	Baghdad Region
Al-Rafidain SC	Second Division League	4	Al-Qādisiyyah	Middle Euphrates Region
Al-Ramadi SC	Premier Division League	2	Al-Anbar	Western Region
Al-Rawdhatain SC			Karbala	Middle Euphrates Region
Al-Rifai SC	Second Division League	4	Dhi Qar	Southern Region
Al-Riyadh SC	Second Division League	4	Kirkuk	Northern Region
Al-Rumaitha SC			Al-Muthanna	Middle Euphrates Region
Al-Rusafa SC			Baghdad	Baghdad Region
Al-Rutba SC	Second Division League	4	Al-Anbar	Western Region
Al-Sadda SC			Babil	Middle Euphrates Region
Al-Sadeq SC	First Division League	3	Basra	Southern Region
Al-Salam SC			Baghdad	Baghdad Region
Al-Salman SC			Al-Muthanna	Middle Euphrates Region
Al-Samawa SC	First Division League	3	Al-Muthanna	Middle Euphrates Region
Al-Saniya SC	Second Division League	4	Al-Qādisiyyah	Middle Euphrates Region
Al-Shabab SC	Second Division League	4	Baghdad	Baghdad Region
Al-Shabab Al-Basri SC	Second Division League	4	Basra	Southern Region
Al-Shaheed Arkan SC	Second Division League	4	Diyala	Western Region
Al-Shamiya SC	Second Division League	4	Al-Qādisiyyah	Middle Euphrates Region
Al-Sharqiya SC	Second Division League	4	Wasit	Southern Region
Al-Shatra SC	Second Division League	4	Dhi Qar	Southern Region
Al-Shirqat SC	Premier Division League	2	Saladin	Western Region
Al-Shorija SC	Second Division League	4	Kirkuk	Northern Region
Al-Shorta SC	Stars League	1	Baghdad	Baghdad Region
Al-Shuala SC	Second Division League	4	Baghdad	Baghdad Region
Al-Shuhadaa SC			Wasit	Southern Region
Al-Sihha wal-Bi'a SC			Baghdad	Baghdad Region
Al-Sikak SC			Baghdad	Baghdad Region
Al-Sinaa SC	Premier Division League	2	Baghdad	Baghdad Region
Al-Sinaat Al-Harbiya SC	Second Division League	4	Baghdad	Baghdad Region
Al-Sinaat Al-Kahrabaiya SC	Premier Division League	2	Baghdad	Baghdad Region
Al-Siyaha SC			Baghdad	Baghdad Region
Al-Sufiya SC	First Division League	3	Al-Anbar	Western Region
Al-Sukar SC			Maysan	Southern Region
Al-Sulaikh SC	First Division League	3	Baghdad	Baghdad Region
Al-Sumoud SC	Second Division League	4	Al-Anbar	Western Region
Al-Suwaira SC	First Division League	3	Wasit	Southern Region
Al-Tadamon SC			Najaf	Middle Euphrates Region
Al-Taji SC	First Division League	3	Baghdad	Baghdad Region
Al-Talaba SC	Stars League	1	Baghdad	Baghdad Region
Al-Taliea SC			Baghdad	Baghdad Region
Al-Tarmiya SC			Baghdad	Baghdad Region
Al-Thawra SC			Kirkuk	Northern Region
Al-Tijara SC			Baghdad	Baghdad Region
Al-Umal SC			Baghdad	Baghdad Region
Al-Wajihiya SC	Second Division League	4	Diyala	Western Region
Al-Wydad SC			Wasit	Southern Region
Al-Yaqdha SC	Second Division League	4	Al-Qādisiyyah	Middle Euphrates Region
Al-Zaeem SC			Wasit	Southern Region
Al-Zafaraniya SC			Baghdad	Baghdad Region
Al-Zawraa SC	Stars League	1	Baghdad	Baghdad Region
Al-Zehirat SC			Diyala	Western Region
Al-Zubair SC			Basra	Southern Region
Aliyat Al-Shorta SC			Baghdad	Baghdad Region
Altun Kupri SC	Second Division League	4	Kirkuk	Northern Region
Amanat Baghdad SC	Stars League	1	Baghdad	Baghdad Region
Anah SC	Second Division League	4	Al-Anbar	Western Region
Ararat SC	First Division League	3	Erbil	Northern Region
Aso SC			Erbil	Northern Region

=== B ===
Club	Division	Level	Location	Region
Baban SC			Sulaymaniyah	Northern Region
Babil SC	Second Division League	4	Babil	Middle Euphrates Region
Baiji SC	Second Division League	4	Saladin	Western Region
Balad SC	Second Division League	4	Saladin	Western Region
Balad Ruz SC			Diyala	Western Region
Baladiyat Al-Basra SC	Second Division League	4	Basra	Southern Region
Baladiyat Al-Mosul SC	First Division League	3	Nineveh	Northern Region
Baladiyat Al-Nasiriya SC	Second Division League	4	Dhi Qar	Southern Region
Bani Saad SC	Second Division League	4	Diyala	Western Region
Baquba SC	Second Division League	4	Diyala	Western Region
Basmaya SC			Baghdad	Baghdad Region
Bilad Al-Rafidain SC	Second Division League	4	Diyala	Western Region
Biladi SC			Baghdad	Baghdad Region
Brayati SC			Erbil	Northern Region
Brusk SC			Erbil	Northern Region

=== D ===
Club	Division	Level	Location	Region
Damuk SC			Wasit	Southern Region
Daquq SC			Kirkuk	Northern Region
Dhi Qar SC	Second Division League	4	Dhi Qar	Southern Region
Dijla SC	Second Division League	4	Maysan	Southern Region
Diyala SC	Premier Division League	2	Diyala	Western Region
Duhok SC	Stars League	1	Duhok	Northern Region

=== E ===
Club	Division	Level	Location	Region
Erbil SC	Stars League	1	Erbil	Northern Region

=== G ===
Club	Division	Level	Location	Region
Ghammas SC	Second Division League	4	Al-Qādisiyyah	Middle Euphrates Region
Gharb Baghdad SC			Baghdad	Baghdad Region
Ghaz Al-Junoob SC	Second Division League	4	Basra	Southern Region
Ghaz Al-Shamal SC	Premier Division League	2	Kirkuk	Northern Region

=== H ===
Club	Division	Level	Location	Region
Habbaniyat Al-Sumood SC	Second Division League	4	Al-Anbar	Western Region
Haifa SC			Baghdad	Baghdad Region
Handren SC			Erbil	Northern Region
Hibhib SC	Second Division League	4	Diyala	Western Region
Hit SC	Second Division League	4	Al-Anbar	Western Region

=== I ===
Club	Division	Level	Location	Region
Ittihad Al-Hawija SC			Kirkuk	Northern Region

=== J ===
Club	Division	Level	Location	Region
Jabla SC			Babil	Middle Euphrates Region
Jadidat Al-Shatt SC	First Division League	3	Diyala	Western Region
Jalawla SC	Second Division League	4	Diyala	Western Region
Jenaain Babil SC			Babil	Middle Euphrates Region
Jisr Diyala SC			Baghdad	Baghdad Region
Junoob Baghdad SC	Second Division League	4	Baghdad	Baghdad Region

=== K ===
Club	Division	Level	Location	Region
Kahrabaa Al-Hartha SC	Second Division League	4	Basra	Southern Region
Karbala SC	Stars League	1	Karbala	Middle Euphrates Region
Kaywan SC	Second Division League	4	Kirkuk	Northern Region
Khak SC	Second Division League	4	Kirkuk	Northern Region
Khanaqin SC	Second Division League	4	Diyala	Western Region
Kirkuk SC			Kirkuk	Northern Region

=== M ===
Club	Division	Level	Location	Region
Mandali SC			Diyala	Western Region
Masafi Al-Junoob SC	Premier Division League	2	Basra	Southern Region
Masafi Al-Shamal SC			Saladin	Western Region
Masafi Al-Wasat SC	Premier Division League	2	Baghdad	Baghdad Region
Maysan SC	Premier Division League	2	Maysan	Southern Region
Medinat Al-Shuhadaa SC	Second Division League	4	Basra	Southern Region
Musalla SC			Kirkuk	Northern Region

=== N ===
Club	Division	Level	Location	Region
Naft Al-Basra SC	Stars League	1	Basra	Southern Region
Naft Al-Shamal SC	First Division League	3	Kirkuk	Northern Region
Naft Al-Wasat SC	Stars League	1	Najaf	Middle Euphrates Region
Naft Maysan SC	Stars League	1	Maysan	Southern Region
New Sirwan SC			Sulaymaniyah	Northern Region
Newroz SC	Stars League	1	Sulaymaniyah	Northern Region

=== P ===
Club	Division	Level	Location	Region
Peshmerga Hawler SC			Erbil	Northern Region
Peshmerga Sulaymaniya SC	Premier Division League	2	Sulaymaniyah	Northern Region

=== Q ===
Club	Division	Level	Location	Region
Qalat Saleh SC			Maysan	Southern Region
Qalat Sukar SC	Second Division League	4	Dhi Qar	Southern Region
Qazaniya SC	Second Division League	4	Diyala	Western Region

=== R ===
Club	Division	Level	Location	Region
Rabia SC	Second Division League	4	Nineveh	Northern Region

=== S ===
Club	Division	Level	Location	Region
Saad SC	Second Division League	4	Saladin	Western Region
Safwan SC			Basra	Southern Region
Sahl Nineveh SC	Second Division League	4	Nineveh	Northern Region
Salahaddin SC	Second Division League	4	Saladin	Western Region
Samarra SC	Premier Division League	2	Saladin	Western Region
Shabab Al-Adil SC			Baghdad	Baghdad Region
Shabab Al-Dawr SC	Second Division League	4	Saladin	Western Region
Shabab Al-Iraq SC			Baghdad	Baghdad Region
Shahraban SC	Second Division League	4	Diyala	Western Region
Shatt Al-Arab SC	Second Division League	4	Basra	Southern Region
Simele SC			Duhok	Northern Region
Sulaymaniya SC			Sulaymaniyah	Northern Region
Sumer SC			Al-Qādisiyyah	Middle Euphrates Region
Suq Al-Shuyukh SC			Dhi Qar	Southern Region

=== T ===
Club	Division	Level	Location	Region
Tarmi SC	Second Division League	4	Nineveh	Northern Region
Taza SC	Second Division League	4	Kirkuk	Northern Region
Tikrit SC			Saladin	Western Region
Tuz SC	Second Division League	4	Saladin	Western Region

=== U ===
Club	Division	Level	Location	Region
Umal Nineveh SC	Second Division League	4	Nineveh	Northern Region
Umm Qasr SC	Second Division League	4	Basra	Southern Region
Uruk SC			Al-Muthanna	Middle Euphrates Region

=== W ===
Club	Division	Level	Location	Region
Wasit SC	Second Division League	4	Wasit	Southern Region

=== Z ===
Club	Division	Level	Location	Region
Zakho SC	Stars League	1	Duhok	Northern Region
Zeravani SC			Duhok	Northern Region

== See also ==
- List of football clubs in Iraq by major honours won
