= 2023–24 Iraqi Second Division League =

50th Iraqi Second Division League season

Iraqi Second Division League
- Season: 2023–24
- Champions: Al-Jaish
- Promoted: Al-Jaish, Al-Falluja

The 2023–24 Iraqi Second Division League is the 50th season of the Iraqi Second Division League, the fourth tier of the Iraqi football league system, since its establishment in 1974, and the first under its new name. The number of clubs in the league have varied throughout history for various reasons; 170 clubs participated in this year's edition. The top four teams in the Final Qualifiers will be promoted directly to the Iraqi First Division League.

== Overview ==
A total of 170 teams are competing for the league after some teams withdrew for financial reasons. The teams are originally promoted to the Iraqi First Division League based on the rule of one qualified team out of every five participating teams. The number of teams that will be promoted to the First Division League will be 4 teams.

== Teams ==
=== Clubs and locations ===
The 170 clubs are supposed to be divided into 18 groups by location (some of these groups play in subgroups as well), and each group represents the province to which these clubs belong and lies within its borders. But there are 5 provinces that do not have clubs that play in this level.

No.	Governorates	Teams
1	Dohuk	
2	Nineveh	Al-Fotuwa; Al-Mustaqbal Al-Mushriq; Al-Shoura; Rabia; Sahl Nineveh; Shabab Al-Qayyara; Tarmi; Umal Nineveh
3	Erbil	
4	Kirkuk	Al-Dibis; Al-Ekhaa; Al-Nujoom; Al-Riyadh; Al-Shorija; Al-Turkman; Al-Zab; Altun Kupri; Baba Gurgur; Kaywan; Khak; Qandeel; Shabab Al-Dibis; Sulaf; Taza; Tuz; Wahid Huzairan
5	Sulaymaniyah	
6	Saladin	Al-Dhuluiya; Al-Dujail; Baiji; Balad; Saad; Salahaddin; Shabab Al-Dawr
7	Al Anbar	A'ali Al-Furat; Abu Risha; Al-Anbar; Al-Baghdadi; Al-Dawar; Al-Falluja; Al-Habbaniya; Al-Mustaqbal; Al-Nassaf; Al-Nasr Al-Anbari; Al-Rutba; Al-Siddiqiya; Al-Sumoud; Al-Taawon; Al-Wihda; Anah; Barwana; Habbaniyat Al-Sumood; Haditha; Hit; Rawa
8	Baghdad	Abnaa Al-Madina; Al-Adala; Al-Ain; Al-Atheer; Al-Baiyaa; Al-Difaa Al-Jawi; Al-Jaish; Al-Majd; Al-Mawared Al-Maiya; Al-Mithaq; Al-Radd Al-Sariea; Al-Shabab; Al-Sinaat Al-Harbiya; Al-Shuala; Al-Tatweer; Junoob Baghdad
9	Diyala	Al-Mansouriya; Al-Miqdadiya; Al-Shaheed Arkan; Al-Wajihiya; Bani Saad; Baquba; Bilad Al-Rafidain; Buhriz; Hibhib; Jalawla; Khanaqin; Qazaniya; Shahraban
10	Karbala	Al-Ebdaa; Al-Ghadeer; Al-Hindiya; Al-Hurr; Al-Jamahir; Al-Nidhal; Al-Taff; Ain Al-Tamur; Imam Al-Muttaqeen
11	Babil	Al-Hilla; Al-Mahawil; Al-Mashroua; Al-Midhatiya; Al-Neel; Al-Shomali; Babil; Ibrahim Al-Khalil
12	Wasit	Al-Ahrar; Al-Aziziya; Al-Dujaila; Al-Falahiya; Al-Izza; Al-Jihad; Al-Khajiya; Al-Muwafaqiya; Al-Nahrain; Al-Sharqiya; Wasit; Al-Zaytoun; Al-Zubaidiya
13	Najaf	
14	Al-Qādisiyyah	Al-Daghara; Al-Hamza; Al-Intifadha; Al-Mahanawiya; Al-Najma; Al-Rafidain; Al-Saniya; Al-Shamiya; Al-Yaqdha; Azeez Al-Iraq; Ghammas; Nippur
15	Maysan	Ahrar Maysan; Ahly Maysan; Al-Amara; Al-Amir; Al-Maimouna; Al-Majar; Al-Shaheed Saad; Ali Al-Gharbi; Dijlah; Kumayt; Salam Maysan
16	Muthanna	
17	Dhi Qar	Akkad; Al-Ahwar; Al-Bathaa; Al-Chibayish; Al-Dawaya; Al-Dhifaf; Al-Fohoud; Al-Fajr; Al-Nassr; Al-Rifai; Al-Shatra; Baladiyat Al-Nasiriyah; Dhi Qar; Maysaloon; Qalat Sukar; Shabab Al-Amir; Teshrin
18	Basra	Abi Al-Khaseeb; Al-Dair; Al-Faw; Al-Fayhaa; Al-Ittihad; Al-Junoob; Al-Khaleej Al-Arabi; Al-Khor; Al-Maqal; Al-Midaina; Al-Noor; Al-Shabab Al-Basri; Baladiyat Al-Basra; Ghaz Al-Junoob; Kahrabaa Al-Hartha; Medinat Al-Shuhadaa; Shatt Al-Arab; Umm Qasr

== First round ==
=== 1- Dohuk Group ===
There are no teams in Dohuk that play in this division.

=== 2- Nineveh Group ===
Pos	Team	Pld	W	D	L	GF	GA	GD	Pts	Promotion
1	Umal Nineveh	3	2	0	1	7	5	+2	6	Qualification to the Second round
2	Sahl Nineveh	3	2	0	1	6	4	+2	6	Qualification to the Second round
3	Shabab Al-Qayyara	3	2	0	1	6	5	+1	6	
4	Tarmi	3	1	2	0	5	3	+2	5	
5	Rabia	2	1	1	0	5	4	+1	4	
6	Al-Shoura	4	1	2	1	6	6	0	5	
7	Al-Fotuwa	3	0	1	2	3	7	−4	1	
8	Al-Mustaqbal Al-Mushriq	3	0	0	3	5	9	−4	0	

Updated to match(es) played on 3 February 2024. Source: IFA official website
Rules for classification: 1) points; 2) head-to-head points; 3) head-to-head goal difference; 4) goal difference; 5) number of wins; 6) number of goals scored.

=== 3- Erbil Group ===
There are no teams in Erbil that play in this division.

=== 4- Kirkuk Group First round ===
==== Group 1 ====
Pos	Team	Pld	W	D	L	GF	GA	GD	Pts	Promotion
1	Al-Riyadh	2	2	0	0	7	3	+4	6	Qualification to the Second round
2	Al-Zab	2	1	0	1	3	3	0	3	
3	Shabab Al-Dibis	2	0	0	2	3	7	−4	0	

Updated to match(es) played on 28 January 2024. Source: IFA official website
Rules for classification: 1) points; 2) head-to-head points; 3) head-to-head goal difference; 4) goal difference; 5) number of wins; 6) number of goals scored.

==== Group 2 ====
Pos	Team	Pld	W	D	L	GF	GA	GD	Pts	Promotion
1	Al-Ekhaa	2	2	0	0	5	3	+2	6	Qualification to the Second round
2	Taza	2	1	0	1	2	2	0	3	
3	Al-Nujoom	2	0	0	2	2	4	−2	0	

Updated to match(es) played on 28 January 2024. Source: IFA official website
Rules for classification: 1) points; 2) head-to-head points; 3) head-to-head goal difference; 4) goal difference; 5) number of wins; 6) number of goals scored.

==== Group 3 ====
Pos	Team	Pld	W	D	L	GF	GA	GD	Pts	Promotion
1	Altun Kupri	2	1	1	0	9	2	+7	4	Qualification to the Second round
2	Qandeel	2	1	1	0	5	4	+1	4	
3	Al-Dibis	2	0	0	2	2	10	−8	0	

Updated to match(es) played on 28 January 2024. Source: IFA official website
Rules for classification: 1) points; 2) head-to-head points; 3) head-to-head goal difference; 4) goal difference; 5) number of wins; 6) number of goals scored.

==== Group 4 ====
Pos	Team	Pld	W	D	L	GF	GA	GD	Pts	Promotion
1	Wahid Huzairan	3	3	0	0	8	0	+8	9	Qualification to the Second round
2	Al-Shorija	3	1	1	1	5	2	+3	4	Qualification for the Play-off
3	Baba Gurgur	3	1	1	1	3	2	+1	4	
4	Kaywan	3	0	0	3	0	12	−12	0	

Updated to match(es) played on 28 January 2024. Source: IFA official website
Rules for classification: 1) points; 2) head-to-head points; 3) head-to-head goal difference; 4) goal difference; 5) number of wins; 6) number of goals scored.

=== 4- Kirkuk Group Second round ===
==== Group 1 ====
Pos	Team	Pld	W	D	L	GF	GA	GD	Pts	Promotion
1	Tuz	1	1	0	0	4	2	+2	3	Qualification to the Third round
2	Wahid Huzairan	0	0	0	0	0	0	0	0	
3	Al-Riyadh	1	0	0	1	2	4	−2	0	

Updated to match(es) played on 3 February 2024. Source: IFA official website
Rules for classification: 1) points; 2) head-to-head points; 3) head-to-head goal difference; 4) goal difference; 5) number of wins; 6) number of goals scored.

==== Group 2 ====
Pos	Team	Pld	W	D	L	GF	GA	GD	Pts	Promotion
1	Al-Ekhaa	0	0	0	0	0	0	0	0	Qualification to the Third round
2	Altun Kupri	0	0	0	0	0	0	0	0	
3	Khak	0	0	0	0	0	0	0	0	

Updated to match(es) played on 1 February 2024. Source: IFA official website
Rules for classification: 1) points; 2) head-to-head points; 3) head-to-head goal difference; 4) goal difference; 5) number of wins; 6) number of goals scored.

==== Group 5 ====
Pos	Team	Pld	W	D	L	GF	GA	GD	Pts	Promotion
1	Khak	3	3	0	0	16	3	+13	9	Qualification to the Second round
2	Tuz	3	2	0	1	8	5	+3	6	Qualification for the Play-off
3	Sulaf	3	0	1	2	6	12	−6	1	
4	Al-Turkman	3	0	1	2	3	13	−10	1	

Updated to match(es) played on 28 January 2024. Source: IFA official website
Rules for classification: 1) points; 2) head-to-head points; 3) head-to-head goal difference; 4) goal difference; 5) number of wins; 6) number of goals scored.

==== Play-off ====
Team 1	Score	Team 2
Al-Shorija	0–2	Tuz

=== 5- Sulaymaniyah Group ===
There are no teams in Sulaymaniyah that play in this division.

=== 6- Saladin Group ===
Pos	Team	Pld	W	D	L	GF	GA	GD	Pts	Promotion
1	Balad	7	3	4	0	9	4	+5	13	Qualification to the Second round
2	Al-Dujail	7	3	3	1	9	4	+5	12	Qualification to the Second round
3	Shabab Al-Dawr	7	3	3	1	12	8	+4	12	
4	Salahaddin	7	2	4	1	7	7	0	10	
5	Saad	7	2	2	3	4	9	−5	8	
6	Al-Dhuluiya	7	2	1	4	8	11	−3	7	
7	Baiji	6	0	1	5	6	12	−6	1	

Updated to match(es) played on 3 February 2024. Source: IFA official website
Rules for classification: 1) points; 2) head-to-head points; 3) head-to-head goal difference; 4) goal difference; 5) number of wins; 6) number of goals scored.

=== 7- Al-Anbar Group ===
==== Group 1 ====
Pos	Team	Pld	W	D	L	GF	GA	GD	Pts	Promotion
1	Al-Nasr Al-Anbari	2	2	0	0	5	2	+3	6	Qualification to the Second round
2	Abu Risha	2	2	0	0	4	1	+3	6	
3	Al-Taawon	2	1	0	1	4	4	0	3	
4	Al-Mustaqbal	2	1	0	1	3	3	0	3	
5	Al-Anbar	2	0	0	2	1	3	−2	0	
6	Al-Wihda	2	0	0	2	2	6	−4	0	

Updated to match(es) played on 3 February 2024. Source: IFA official website
Rules for classification: 1) points; 2) head-to-head points; 3) head-to-head goal difference; 4) goal difference; 5) number of wins; 6) number of goals scored.

==== Group 2 ====
Pos	Team	Pld	W	D	L	GF	GA	GD	Pts	Promotion
1	Al-Falluja	2	2	0	0	4	1	+3	6	Qualification to the Second round
2	A'ali Al-Furat	2	1	1	0	7	3	+4	4	
3	Al-Habbaniya	2	1	1	0	5	3	+2	4	
4	Al-Sumoud	1	0	0	1	1	2	−1	0	
5	Habbaniyat Al-Sumood	1	0	0	1	1	3	−2	0	
6	Al-Nassaf	2	0	0	2	1	7	−6	0	

Updated to match(es) played on 3 February 2024. Source: IFA official website
Rules for classification: 1) points; 2) head-to-head points; 3) head-to-head goal difference; 4) goal difference; 5) number of wins; 6) number of goals scored.

==== Group 3 ====
Pos	Team	Pld	W	D	L	GF	GA	GD	Pts	Promotion
1	Anah	1	1	0	0	2	1	+1	3	Qualification to the Second round
2	Barwana	1	0	1	0	1	1	0	1	
3	Rawa	1	0	1	0	1	1	0	1	
4	Al-Baghdadi	0	0	0	0	0	0	0	0	
5	Haditha	1	0	0	1	1	2	−1	0	

Updated to match(es) played on 3 February 2024. Source: IFA official website
Rules for classification: 1) points; 2) head-to-head points; 3) head-to-head goal difference; 4) goal difference; 5) number of wins; 6) number of goals scored.

==== Group 4 ====
Pos	Team	Pld	W	D	L	GF	GA	GD	Pts	Promotion
1	Al-Dawar	2	2	0	0	3	1	+2	6	Qualification to the Second round
2	Hit	2	0	2	0	3	3	0	2	
3	Al-Rutba	2	0	1	1	3	4	−1	1	
4	Al-Siddiqiya	2	0	1	1	1	2	−1	1	

Updated to match(es) played on 3 February 2024. Source: IFA official website
Rules for classification: 1) points; 2) head-to-head points; 3) head-to-head goal difference; 4) goal difference; 5) number of wins; 6) number of goals scored.

=== 8- Baghdad Groups ===
==== Group 1 ====
Pos	Team	Pld	W	D	L	GF	GA	GD	Pts	Promotion
1	Al-Adala	4	4	0	0	13	1	+12	12	Qualification to the Second round
2	Al-Mawared Al-Maiya	5	4	0	1	14	2	+12	12	Qualification to the Second round
3	Al-Radd Al-Sariea	3	2	0	1	10	4	+6	6	
4	Abnaa Al-Madina	4	0	0	4	1	15	−14	0	
5	Al-Ain	4	0	0	4	1	17	−16	0	

Updated to match(es) played on 1 February 2024. Source: IFA official website
Rules for classification: 1) points; 2) head-to-head points; 3) head-to-head goal difference; 4) goal difference; 5) number of wins; 6) number of goals scored.

==== Group 2 ====
Pos	Team	Pld	W	D	L	GF	GA	GD	Pts	Promotion
1	Al-Difaa Al-Jawi	6	5	1	0	18	2	+16	16	Qualification to the Second round
2	Al-Shuala	6	4	1	1	8	2	+6	13	Qualification to the Second round
3	Al-Shabab	5	2	2	1	6	2	+4	8	
4	Al-Atheer	4	1	0	3	3	7	−4	3	
5	Al-Baiyaa	5	1	0	4	3	9	−6	3	
6	Junoob Baghdad	6	1	0	5	7	23	−16	3	

Updated to match(es) played on 2 February 2024. Source: IFA official website
Rules for classification: 1) points; 2) head-to-head points; 3) head-to-head goal difference; 4) goal difference; 5) number of wins; 6) number of goals scored.

==== Group 3 ====
Pos	Team	Pld	W	D	L	GF	GA	GD	Pts	Promotion
1	Al-Jaish	5	4	1	0	15	2	+13	13	Qualification to the Second round
2	Al-Mithaq	4	2	1	1	8	3	+5	7	Qualification to the Second round
3	Al-Tatweer	5	2	2	1	7	5	+2	8	
4	Al-Sinaat Al-Harbiya	5	1	2	2	9	5	+4	5	
5	Al-Majd	5	0	0	5	2	26	−24	0	

Updated to match(es) played on 2 February 2024. Source: IFA official website
Rules for classification: 1) points; 2) head-to-head points; 3) head-to-head goal difference; 4) goal difference; 5) number of wins; 6) number of goals scored.

=== 9- Diyala Group ===
==== Group 1 ====
Pos	Team	Pld	W	D	L	GF	GA	GD	Pts	Promotion
1	Shahraban	4	3	0	1	5	1	+4	9	Qualification to the Second round
2	Jalawla	4	3	0	1	7	5	+2	9	
3	Al-Miqdadiya	4	1	1	2	6	5	+1	4	
4	Hibhib	4	0	1	3	3	10	−7	1	

Updated to match(es) played on 31 January 2024. Source: IFA official website
Rules for classification: 1) points; 2) head-to-head points; 3) head-to-head goal difference; 4) goal difference; 5) number of wins; 6) number of goals scored.

==== Group 2 ====
Pos	Team	Pld	W	D	L	GF	GA	GD	Pts	Promotion
1	Bani Saad	4	2	2	0	12	7	+5	8	Qualification to the Second round
2	Al-Shaheed Arkan	4	2	1	1	7	9	−2	7	
3	Bilad Al-Rafidain	4	2	0	2	8	7	+1	6	
4	Baquba	4	0	1	3	7	11	−4	1	

Updated to match(es) played on 31 January 2024. Source: IFA official website
Rules for classification: 1) points; 2) head-to-head points; 3) head-to-head goal difference; 4) goal difference; 5) number of wins; 6) number of goals scored.

==== Group 3 ====
Pos	Team	Pld	W	D	L	GF	GA	GD	Pts	Promotion
1	Buhriz	2	2	0	0	7	0	+7	6	Qualification to the Second round
2	Al-Mansouriya	3	2	0	1	6	4	+2	6	
3	Al-Wajihiya	2	2	0	0	2	0	+2	6	
4	Khanaqin	3	0	1	2	6	10	−4	1	
5	Qazaniya	4	0	1	3	3	10	−7	1	

Updated to match(es) played on 3 February 2024. Source: IFA official website
Rules for classification: 1) points; 2) head-to-head points; 3) head-to-head goal difference; 4) goal difference; 5) number of wins; 6) number of goals scored.

=== 10- Karbalaa Group ===
==== Group 1 ====
Pos	Team	Pld	W	D	L	GF	GA	GD	Pts	Promotion
1	Al-Ebdaa	6	5	1	0	20	5	+15	16	Qualification to the Second round
2	Al-Ghadeer	5	3	1	1	14	5	+9	10	Qualification to the Second round
3	Imam Al-Muttaqeen	4	1	2	1	5	9	−4	5	
4	Al-Taff	5	1	0	4	8	14	−6	3	
5	Ain Al-Tamur	6	1	0	5	10	24	−14	3	

Updated to match(es) played on 3 February 2024. Source: IFA official website
Rules for classification: 1) points; 2) head-to-head points; 3) head-to-head goal difference; 4) goal difference; 5) number of wins; 6) number of goals scored.

==== Group 2 ====
Pos	Team	Pld	W	D	L	GF	GA	GD	Pts	Promotion
1	Al-Hindiya	4	2	1	1	8	5	+3	7	Qualification to the Second round
2	Al-Nidhal	4	2	1	1	4	3	+1	7	Qualification to the Second round
3	Al-Jamahir	4	1	1	2	4	6	−2	4	
4	Al-Hurr	4	0	3	1	3	5	−2	3	

Updated to match(es) played on 31 January 2024. Source: IFA official website
Rules for classification: 1) points; 2) head-to-head points; 3) head-to-head goal difference; 4) goal difference; 5) number of wins; 6) number of goals scored.

=== 11- Babil Group ===
==== Group 1 ====
Pos	Team	Pld	W	D	L	GF	GA	GD	Pts	Promotion
1	Ibrahim Al-Khalil	4	2	1	1	7	6	+1	7	Qualification to the Second round
2	Al-Shomali	4	2	0	2	9	7	+2	6	
3	Al-Midhatiya	4	2	0	2	3	4	−1	6	
4	Al-Hilla	4	1	1	2	5	7	−2	4	

Updated to match(es) played on 3 February 2024. Source: IFA official website
Rules for classification: 1) points; 2) head-to-head points; 3) head-to-head goal difference; 4) goal difference; 5) number of wins; 6) number of goals scored.

==== Group 2 ====
Pos	Team	Pld	W	D	L	GF	GA	GD	Pts	Promotion
1	Babil	4	3	1	0	8	4	+4	10	Qualification to the Second round
2	Al-Mahawil	4	1	2	1	5	6	−1	5	
3	Al-Neel	4	0	3	1	5	6	−1	3	
4	Al-Mashroua	4	0	2	2	3	5	−2	2	

Updated to match(es) played on 1 February 2024. Source: IFA official website
Rules for classification: 1) points; 2) head-to-head points; 3) head-to-head goal difference; 4) goal difference; 5) number of wins; 6) number of goals scored.

=== 12- Wasit Groups ===
==== Group 1 ====
Pos	Team	Pld	W	D	L	GF	GA	GD	Pts	Promotion
1	Al-Dujaila	4	2	1	1	5	3	+2	7	Qualification to the Second round
2	Al-Zubaidiya	3	1	2	0	3	1	+2	5	
3	Wasit	3	0	1	2	2	6	−4	1	

Updated to match(es) played on 2 February 2024. Source: IFA official website
Rules for classification: 1) points; 2) head-to-head points; 3) head-to-head goal difference; 4) goal difference; 5) number of wins; 6) number of goals scored.

==== Group 2 ====
Pos	Team	Pld	W	D	L	GF	GA	GD	Pts	Promotion
1	Al-Jihad	3	2	1	0	8	2	+6	7	Qualification to the Second round
2	Al-Falahiya	3	2	1	0	8	2	+6	7	
3	Al-Nahrain	4	0	0	4	2	14	−12	0	

Updated to match(es) played on 2 February 2024. Source: IFA official website
Rules for classification: 1) points; 2) head-to-head points; 3) head-to-head goal difference; 4) goal difference; 5) number of wins; 6) number of goals scored.

==== Group 3 ====
Pos	Team	Pld	W	D	L	GF	GA	GD	Pts	Promotion
1	Al-Zaytoun	5	3	0	2	6	8	−2	9	Qualification to the Second round
2	Al-Aziziya	5	2	2	1	9	5	+4	8	
3	Al-Ahrar	5	2	1	2	6	8	−2	7	
4	Al-Sharqiya	5	1	1	3	7	7	0	4	

Updated to match(es) played on 3 February 2024. Source: IFA official website
Rules for classification: 1) points; 2) head-to-head points; 3) head-to-head goal difference; 4) goal difference; 5) number of wins; 6) number of goals scored.

==== Group 4 ====
Pos	Team	Pld	W	D	L	GF	GA	GD	Pts	Promotion
1	Al-Khajiya	4	1	3	0	4	2	+2	6	Qualification to the Second round
2	Al-Muwafaqiya	3	1	2	0	4	3	+1	5	
3	Al-Izza	3	0	1	2	1	4	−3	1	

Updated to match(es) played on 3 February 2024. Source: IFA official website
Rules for classification: 1) points; 2) head-to-head points; 3) head-to-head goal difference; 4) goal difference; 5) number of wins; 6) number of goals scored.

=== 13- Al-Najaf Group ===
There are no teams in Al-Najaf that play in this division.

=== 14- Al-Qādisiyyah Group ===
==== Group 1 ====
Pos	Team	Pld	W	D	L	GF	GA	GD	Pts	Promotion
1	Al-Yaqdha	4	4	0	0	18	4	+14	12	Qualification to the Second round
2	Al-Saniya	4	2	1	1	6	9	−3	7	
3	Nippur	4	1	0	3	8	10	−2	3	
4	Al-Rafidain	4	0	1	3	3	12	−9	1	

Updated to match(es) played on 3 February 2024. Source: IFA official website
Rules for classification: 1) points; 2) head-to-head points; 3) head-to-head goal difference; 4) goal difference; 5) number of wins; 6) number of goals scored.

==== Group 2 ====
Pos	Team	Pld	W	D	L	GF	GA	GD	Pts	Promotion
1	Al-Najma	4	2	2	0	8	4	+4	8	Qualification to the Second round
2	Al-Daghara	4	1	3	0	6	5	+1	6	
3	Al-Shamiya	4	0	3	1	3	4	−1	3	
4	Ghammas	4	0	2	2	4	8	−4	2	

Updated to match(es) played on 3 February 2024. Source: IFA official website
Rules for classification: 1) points; 2) head-to-head points; 3) head-to-head goal difference; 4) goal difference; 5) number of wins; 6) number of goals scored.

==== Group 3 ====
Pos	Team	Pld	W	D	L	GF	GA	GD	Pts	Promotion
1	Al-Hamza	4	2	2	0	7	1	+6	8	Qualification to the Second round
2	Al-Mahanawiya	4	2	1	1	10	4	+6	7	
3	Al-Intifadha	4	1	2	1	3	5	−2	5	
4	Azeez Al-Iraq	4	0	1	3	2	12	−10	1	

Updated to match(es) played on 2 February 2024. Source: IFA official website
Rules for classification: 1) points; 2) head-to-head points; 3) head-to-head goal difference; 4) goal difference; 5) number of wins; 6) number of goals scored.

=== 15- Maysan Group ===
==== Group 1 ====
Pos	Team	Pld	W	D	L	GF	GA	GD	Pts	Promotion
1	Ahly Maysan	2	2	0	0	5	0	+5	6	Qualification to the Second round
2	Ali Al-Gharbi	3	1	1	1	5	4	+1	4	
3	Al-Amir	2	1	1	0	3	2	+1	4	
4	Al-Amara	3	0	2	1	3	5	−2	2	
5	Dijlah	2	0	0	2	0	5	−5	0	

Updated to match(es) played on 2 February 2024. Source: IFA official website
Rules for classification: 1) points; 2) head-to-head points; 3) head-to-head goal difference; 4) goal difference; 5) number of wins; 6) number of goals scored.

==== Group 2 ====
Pos	Team	Pld	W	D	L	GF	GA	GD	Pts	Promotion
1	Al-Shaheed Saad	3	2	0	1	6	3	+3	6	Qualification to the Second round
2	Al-Maimouna	2	2	0	0	4	1	+3	6	
3	Kumayt	2	1	1	0	5	2	+3	4	
4	Al-Majar	2	0	1	1	3	4	−1	1	
5	Ahrar Maysan	3	0	0	3	1	9	−8	0	

Updated to match(es) played on 3 February 2024. Source: IFA official website
Rules for classification: 1) points; 2) head-to-head points; 3) head-to-head goal difference; 4) goal difference; 5) number of wins; 6) number of goals scored.

=== 16- Al-Muthanna Group ===
There are no teams in Al-Muthanna that play in this division.

=== 17- Dhi Qar Group ===
==== Group 1 ====
Pos	Team	Pld	W	D	L	GF	GA	GD	Pts	Promotion
1	Al-Fajr	4	3	1	0	9	2	+7	10	Qualification to the Second round
2	Al-Nasr	3	2	0	1	5	2	+3	6	Qualification for the Play-off
3	Al-Rifai	3	2	1	0	4	1	+3	7	
4	Qalat Sukar	3	1	0	2	2	4	−2	3	
5	Shabab Al-Amir	3	0	1	2	1	4	−3	1	
6	Maysaloon	4	0	1	3	1	9	−8	1	

Updated to match(es) played on 3 February 2024. Source: IFA official website
Rules for classification: 1) points; 2) head-to-head points; 3) head-to-head goal difference; 4) goal difference; 5) number of wins; 6) number of goals scored.

==== Group 2 ====
Pos	Team	Pld	W	D	L	GF	GA	GD	Pts	Promotion
1	Akkad	4	3	1	0	8	0	+8	10	Qualification to the Second round
2	Al-Dawaya	4	2	1	1	7	2	+5	7	Qualification for the Play-off
3	Al-Shatra	4	2	1	1	3	2	+1	7	
4	Dhi Qar	4	1	1	2	2	5	−3	4	
5	Al-Bathaa	3	1	0	2	3	5	−2	3	
6	Al-Dhifaf	3	0	0	3	1	10	−9	0	

Updated to match(es) played on 3 February 2024. Source: IFA official website
Rules for classification: 1) points; 2) head-to-head points; 3) head-to-head goal difference; 4) goal difference; 5) number of wins; 6) number of goals scored.

==== Group 3 ====
Pos	Team	Pld	W	D	L	GF	GA	GD	Pts	Promotion
1	Teshrin	3	3	0	0	9	0	+9	9	Qualification to the Second round
2	Al-Fohoud	3	1	2	0	3	1	+2	5	Qualification for the Play-off
3	Baladiyat Al-Nasiriyah	3	1	1	1	2	6	−4	4	
4	Al-Chibayish	2	0	1	1	0	3	−3	1	
5	Al-Ahwar	3	0	0	3	0	4	−4	0	

Updated to match(es) played on 3 February 2024. Source: IFA official website
Rules for classification: 1) points; 2) head-to-head points; 3) head-to-head goal difference; 4) goal difference; 5) number of wins; 6) number of goals scored.

=== 18- Basra Group ===
==== Group 1 ====
Pos	Team	Pld	W	D	L	GF	GA	GD	Pts	Promotion
1	Al-Maqal	3	3	0	0	4	1	+3	9	Qualification to the Second round
2	Baladiyat Al-Basra	2	0	1	1	1	2	−1	1	
3	Al-Khaleej Al-Arabi	3	0	1	2	0	2	−2	1	

Updated to match(es) played on 31 January 2024. Source: IFA official website
Rules for classification: 1) points; 2) head-to-head points; 3) head-to-head goal difference; 4) goal difference; 5) number of wins; 6) number of goals scored.

==== Group 2 ====
Pos	Team	Pld	W	D	L	GF	GA	GD	Pts	Promotion
1	Al-Faw	3	3	0	0	9	1	+8	9	Qualification to the Second round
2	Al-Noor	3	2	0	1	5	3	+2	6	
3	Al-Ittihad	4	0	0	4	0	10	−10	0	

Updated to match(es) played on 3 February 2024. Source: IFA official website
Rules for classification: 1) points; 2) head-to-head points; 3) head-to-head goal difference; 4) goal difference; 5) number of wins; 6) number of goals scored.

==== Group 3 ====
Pos	Team	Pld	W	D	L	GF	GA	GD	Pts	Promotion
1	Al-Midaina	4	2	2	0	6	4	+2	8	Qualification to the Second round
2	Al-Dair	3	1	1	1	4	4	0	4	
3	Medinat Al-Shuhadaa	3	0	1	2	3	5	−2	1	

Updated to match(es) played on 3 February 2024. Source: IFA official website
Rules for classification: 1) points; 2) head-to-head points; 3) head-to-head goal difference; 4) goal difference; 5) number of wins; 6) number of goals scored.

==== Group 4 ====
Pos	Team	Pld	W	D	L	GF	GA	GD	Pts	Promotion
1	Ghaz Al-Junoob	4	3	1	0	9	3	+6	10	Qualification to the Second round
2	Umm Qasr	3	1	0	2	5	6	−1	3	
3	Al-Khor	3	0	1	2	5	10	−5	1	

Updated to match(es) played on 3 February 2024. Source: IFA official website
Rules for classification: 1) points; 2) head-to-head points; 3) head-to-head goal difference; 4) goal difference; 5) number of wins; 6) number of goals scored.

==== Group 5 ====
Pos	Team	Pld	W	D	L	GF	GA	GD	Pts	Promotion
1	Shatt Al-Arab	4	3	0	1	15	6	+9	9	Qualification to the Second round
2	Al-Fayhaa	3	1	1	1	5	4	+1	4	
3	Al-Junoob	3	0	1	2	1	11	−10	1	

Updated to match(es) played on 3 February 2024. Source: IFA official website
Rules for classification: 1) points; 2) head-to-head points; 3) head-to-head goal difference; 4) goal difference; 5) number of wins; 6) number of goals scored.

==== Group 6 ====
Pos	Team	Pld	W	D	L	GF	GA	GD	Pts	Promotion
1	Abi Al-Khaseeb	3	3	0	0	12	3	+9	9	Qualification to the Second round
2	Al-Shabab Al-Basri	4	1	0	3	4	10	−6	3	
3	Kahrabaa Al-Hartha	3	1	0	2	6	9	−3	3	

Updated to match(es) played on 3 February 2024. Source: IFA official website
Rules for classification: 1) points; 2) head-to-head points; 3) head-to-head goal difference; 4) goal difference; 5) number of wins; 6) number of goals scored.

== Second round ==
=== Qualified teams ===
Rank	Groups	Governorates	Winners teams	Pre-qualified teams
1	Northern Group	Dohuk		
1	Northern Group	Nineveh		Al-Hadbaa
1	Northern Group	Erbil		
1	Northern Group	Kirkuk	Khak; Tuz	
1	Northern Group	Sulaymaniyah		Baban; Qaladiza
2	Western Group	Saladin		Al-Ishaqi; Masafi Al-Shamal
2	Western Group	Al-Anbar	Al-Fallujah; Al-Nasr Al-Anbari; Abu Risha	
2	Western Group	Diyala		Balad Ruz
3	Baghdad Group	Baghdad	Al-Difaa Al-Jawi; Al-Mawared Al-Maiya	Al-Mahmoudiya; Al-Maslaha; Al-Jaish; Al-Sikak; Al-Tijara; Aliyat Al-Shorta; Haifa
4	Central Euphrates Group	Karbalaa		Al-Ghadhriya
4	Central Euphrates Group	Babil		
4	Central Euphrates Group	Al-Najaf		
4	Central Euphrates Group	Al-Qādisiyyah	Al-Hamza; Al-Najma	Al-Ettifaq
4	Central Euphrates Group	Al-Muthanna		Uruk
5	Southern Group	Wasit	Al-Falahiya	Al-Hay
5	Southern Group	Maysan		Qalat Saleh
5	Southern Group	Dhi Qar	Al-Shatra	Suq Al-Shuyukh
5	Southern Group	Basra		Al-Zubair; Safwan

=== Group 1 ===
Pos	Team	Pld	W	D	L	GF	GA	GD	Pts	Promotion
1	Al-Tijara	6	5	0	1	13	5	+8	15	Qualification to the Second round
2	Masafi Al-Shamal	6	5	0	1	11	5	+6	15	
3	Al-Maslaha	6	2	0	4	7	10	−3	6	
4	Balad Ruz	6	0	0	6	4	15	−11	0	

Updated to match(es) played on 19 July 2024. Source: IFA official website
Rules for classification: 1) points; 2) head-to-head points; 3) head-to-head goal difference; 4) goal difference; 5) number of wins; 6) number of goals scored.

=== Group 2 ===
Pos	Team	Pld	W	D	L	GF	GA	GD	Pts	Promotion
1	Aliyat Al-Shorta	6	4	1	1	18	7	+11	13	Qualification to the Second round
2	Al-Nasr Al-Anbari	6	3	2	1	14	9	+5	11	
3	Khak	6	1	2	3	8	14	−6	5	
4	Baban	6	1	1	4	6	16	−10	4	

Updated to match(es) played on 19 July 2024. Source: IFA official website
Rules for classification: 1) points; 2) head-to-head points; 3) head-to-head goal difference; 4) goal difference; 5) number of wins; 6) number of goals scored.

=== Group 3 ===
Pos	Team	Pld	W	D	L	GF	GA	GD	Pts	Promotion
1	Tuz	6	5	0	1	21	7	+14	15	Qualification to the Second round
2	Abu Risha	6	4	1	1	15	7	+8	13	
3	Al-Mahmoudiya	6	2	0	4	14	19	−5	6	
4	Qaladiza	6	0	1	5	7	14	−7	1	

Updated to match(es) played on 19 July 2024. Source: IFA official website
Rules for classification: 1) points; 2) head-to-head points; 3) head-to-head goal difference; 4) goal difference; 5) number of wins; 6) number of goals scored.

=== Group 4 ===
Pos	Team	Pld	W	D	L	GF	GA	GD	Pts	Promotion
1	Al-Mawared Al-Maiya	6	4	1	1	15	2	+13	13	Qualification to the Second round
2	Al-Fallujah	6	4	1	1	13	6	+7	13	
3	Al-Ishaqi	6	1	2	3	4	12	−8	5	
4	Al-Hadbaa	6	1	0	5	5	17	−12	3	

Updated to match(es) played on 19 July 2024. Source: IFA official website
Rules for classification: 1) points; 2) head-to-head points; 3) head-to-head goal difference; 4) goal difference; 5) number of wins; 6) number of goals scored.

=== Group 5 ===
Pos	Team	Pld	W	D	L	GF	GA	GD	Pts	Promotion
1	Al-Sikak	6	4	1	1	14	2	+12	13	Qualification to the Second round
2	Al-Shatra	6	4	0	2	14	8	+6	12	
3	Al-Ettifaq	6	2	1	3	5	11	−6	7	
4	Al-Ghadhriya	6	1	0	5	3	13	−10	3	

Updated to match(es) played on 19 July 2024. Source: IFA official website
Rules for classification: 1) points; 2) head-to-head points; 3) head-to-head goal difference; 4) goal difference; 5) number of wins; 6) number of goals scored.

=== Group 6 ===
Pos	Team	Pld	W	D	L	GF	GA	GD	Pts	Promotion
1	Al-Tijara	0	0	0	0	0	0	0	0	Qualification to the Second round
2	Masafi Al-Shamal	0	0	0	0	0	0	0	0	
3	Al-Maslaha	0	0	0	0	0	0	0	0	
4	Balad Ruz	0	0	0	0	0	0	0	0	

Updated to match(es) played on 19 July 2024. Source: IFA official website
Rules for classification: 1) points; 2) head-to-head points; 3) head-to-head goal difference; 4) goal difference; 5) number of wins; 6) number of goals scored.

=== Group 7 ===
Pos	Team	Pld	W	D	L	GF	GA	GD	Pts	Promotion
1	Al-Jaish	6	5	0	1	18	4	+14	15	Qualification to the Second round
2	Al-Najma	6	4	1	1	11	4	+7	13	
3	Qalat Saleh	6	1	1	4	4	17	−13	4	
4	Suq Al-Shuyukh	6	1	0	5	6	14	−8	3	

Updated to match(es) played on 19 July 2024. Source: IFA official website
Rules for classification: 1) points; 2) head-to-head points; 3) head-to-head goal difference; 4) goal difference; 5) number of wins; 6) number of goals scored.

=== Group 8 ===
Pos	Team	Pld	W	D	L	GF	GA	GD	Pts	Promotion
1	Safwan	6	3	2	1	8	5	+3	11	Qualification to the Second round
2	Uruk	6	1	1	4	8	14	−6	4	
3	Al-Falahiya	6	2	3	1	7	7	0	9	
4	Al-Difaa Al-Jawi	6	2	2	2	11	8	+3	8	

Updated to match(es) played on 19 July 2024. Source: IFA official website
Rules for classification: 1) points; 2) head-to-head points; 3) head-to-head goal difference; 4) goal difference; 5) number of wins; 6) number of goals scored.

=== Group 9 ===
Pos	Team	Pld	W	D	L	GF	GA	GD	Pts	Promotion
1	Al-Zubair	6	3	3	0	12	7	+5	12	Qualification to the Second round
2	Al-Hamza	6	0	2	4	7	16	−9	2	
3	Haifa	6	1	5	0	8	7	+1	8	
4	Al-Hay	6	2	2	2	10	7	+3	8	

Updated to match(es) played on 19 July 2024. Source: IFA official website
Rules for classification: 1) points; 2) head-to-head points; 3) head-to-head goal difference; 4) goal difference; 5) number of wins; 6) number of goals scored.

== Final game ==
Al-Jaish	1–1	Al-Falluja
Penalties
	4–2

Al-Taji Stadium, Baghdad

Iraqi Second Division League
2023–24 winner
Al-Jaish
1st title
