= 2004–05 Iraqi First Division League =

Iraqi First Division League
- Season: 2004–05
- Dates: 18 March 2005 – 16 July 2005
- Promoted: Al-Amana; Al-Shatra; Al-Sulaikh; Ararat

The 2004–05 Iraqi First Division League was the 31st season of what is now called the Iraqi Premier Division League, the second tier of the Iraqi football league system, since its establishment in 1974. The number of clubs in the league have varied throughout history for various reasons. The top four teams in second round (winner of each group) are promoted to the Iraqi Premier League.

The season began on Friday 18 March 2005. In the second stage, Al-Amana, Al-Shatra, Al-Sulaikh and Ararat managed to lead the groups and promote to the Premier League.

== First round ==
=== Group 1 ===
Pos	Team	Pld	W	D	L	GF	GA	GD	Pts	
1	Ararat (Q)	9	6	3	0	22	7	+15	21	Qualification to the Second round
2	Brusk (Q)	9	4	3	2	10	10	0	15	Qualification to the Second round
3	Brayati	10	5	3	2	14	9	+5	18	
4	Aso	10	4	2	4	8	8	0	14	
5	Aala (R)	10	2	3	5	12	16	−4	9	Relegation to Iraqi Second Division League
6	Khak (R)	10	0	2	8	3	19	−16	2	Relegation to Iraqi Second Division League

Source: IFA official website
Rules for classification: 1) points; 2) goal difference; 3) number of goals scored.
(Q) Qualified for the phase indicated; (R) Relegated

=== Group 2 ===
Pos	Team	Pld	W	D	L	GF	GA	GD	Pts	
1	Akre (Q)	10	4	4	2	7	2	+5	16	Qualification to the Second round
2	Azady (Q)	10	3	4	3	8	7	+1	13	Qualification to the Second round
3	Newroz	10	3	6	1	5	3	+2	15	
4	Peshmerga	10	3	4	3	9	9	0	13	
5	Al-Thawra (R)	10	2	6	2	4	4	0	12	Relegation to Iraqi Second Division League
6	Mateen (R)	10	2	2	6	4	12	−8	8	Relegation to Iraqi Second Division League

Source: IFA official website
Rules for classification: 1) points; 2) goal difference; 3) number of goals scored.
(Q) Qualified for the phase indicated; (R) Relegated

=== Group 3 ===
Pos	Team	Pld	W	D	L	GF	GA	GD	Pts	
1	Al-Ishaqi (Q)	10	6	3	1	21	8	+13	21	Qualification to the Second round
2	Abu Ghraib (Q)	10	6	3	1	18	10	+8	21	Qualification to the Second round
3	Al-Taji	10	5	2	3	12	8	+4	17	
4	Al-Etisalat	10	4	4	2	25	13	+12	16	
5	Al Tarmiya (R)	10	0	4	6	10	26	−16	4	Relegation to Iraqi Second Division League
6	Abu Jaafar Al-Mansour (R)	10	0	2	8	8	29	−21	2	Relegation to Iraqi Second Division League

Source: IFA official website
Rules for classification: 1) points; 2) goal difference; 3) number of goals scored.
(Q) Qualified for the phase indicated; (R) Relegated

=== Group 4 ===
Pos	Team	Pld	W	D	L	GF	GA	GD	Pts	
1	Al-Sulaikh (Q)	10	4	4	2	7	5	+2	16	Qualification to the Second round
2	Al-Shabab (Q)	10	3	5	2	9	8	+1	14	Qualification to the Second round
3	Al-Nahdha	10	2	7	1	8	7	+1	13	
4	Al-Umal	10	3	4	3	10	10	0	13	
5	Al-Hasanain (R)	10	3	4	3	9	9	0	13	Relegation to Iraqi Second Division League
6	Al-Adala (R)	10	1	4	5	8	12	−4	7	Relegation to Iraqi Second Division League

Source: IFA official website
Rules for classification: 1) points; 2) goal difference; 3) number of goals scored.
(Q) Qualified for the phase indicated; (R) Relegated

=== Group 5 ===
Pos	Team	Pld	W	D	L	GF	GA	GD	Pts	
1	Al-Hussein (Q)	10	6	2	2	21	9	+12	20	Qualification to the Second round
2	Al-Amana (Q)	10	4	5	1	7	4	+3	17	Qualification to the Second round
3	Al-Suwaira	10	5	2	3	16	14	+2	17	
4	Al-Miqdadiya	10	4	2	4	19	18	+1	14	
5	Haifa (R)	10	2	2	6	12	17	−5	8	Relegation to Iraqi Second Division League
6	Al-Siyaha (R)	10	1	3	6	10	23	−13	6	Relegation to Iraqi Second Division League

Source: IFA official website
Rules for classification: 1) points; 2) goal difference; 3) number of goals scored.
(Q) Qualified for the phase indicated; (R) Relegated

=== Group 6 ===
Pos	Team	Pld	W	D	L	GF	GA	GD	Pts	
1	Al-Kufa (Q)	12	8	2	2	20	10	+10	26	Qualification to the Second round
2	Al-Qasim (Q)	12	7	2	3	19	15	+4	23	Qualification to the Second round
3	Al-Jamahir	12	6	4	2	27	11	+16	22	
4	Al-Midhatiya	12	6	3	3	16	11	+5	21	
5	Al-Meshkhab	12	3	3	6	13	18	−5	12	
6	Al-Khawarnaq (R)	12	1	4	7	7	23	−16	7	Relegation to Iraqi Second Division League
7	Shabab Al-Hussein (R)	12	1	2	9	8	22	−14	5	Relegation to Iraqi Second Division League

Source: IFA official website
Rules for classification: 1) points; 2) goal difference; 3) number of goals scored.
(Q) Qualified for the phase indicated; (R) Relegated

=== Group 7 ===
Pos	Team	Pld	W	D	L	GF	GA	GD	Pts	
1	Al-Shatra (Q)	14	6	7	1	20	14	+6	25	Qualification to the Second round
2	Al-Hay (Q)	14	4	3	7	14	16	−2	15	Qualification to the Second round
3	Al-Muthanna	14	7	1	6	17	17	0	22	
4	Wasit	14	5	5	4	14	14	0	20	
5	Al Bdeir	14	5	4	5	19	19	0	19	
6	Al-Numaniya	13	4	5	4	15	15	0	17	
7	Ali Al-Gharbi (R)	14	4	4	6	16	17	−1	16	Relegation to Iraqi Second Division League
8	Al-Shamiya (R)	13	4	3	6	15	18	−3	15	Relegation to Iraqi Second Division League

Source: IFA official website
Rules for classification: 1) points; 2) goal difference; 3) number of goals scored.
(Q) Qualified for the phase indicated; (R) Relegated

=== Group 8 ===
Pos	Team	Pld	W	D	L	GF	GA	GD	Pts	
1	Al-Furat (Q)	14	9	3	2	26	13	+13	30	Qualification to the Second round
2	Ghaz Al-Junoob (Q)	14	8	4	2	25	14	+11	28	Qualification to the Second round
3	Al-Kahlaa	14	6	7	1	18	8	+10	25	
4	Al-Qurna	13	6	3	4	19	18	+1	21	
5	Al-Zubair	13	4	2	7	18	24	−6	14	
6	Kahrabaa Al-Hartha	12	2	5	5	15	18	−3	11	
7	Al-Amara (R)	13	3	1	9	13	29	−16	10	Relegation to Iraqi Second Division League
8	Al-Bahri (R)	13	2	1	10	8	18	−10	7	Relegation to Iraqi Second Division League

Source: IFA official website
Rules for classification: 1) points; 2) goal difference; 3) number of goals scored.
(Q) Qualified for the phase indicated; (R) Relegated

== Second round ==
=== Group 1 ===
Pos	Team	Pld	W	D	L	GF	GA	GD	Pts	
1	Ararat (P)	6	3	2	1	8	4	+4	11	Promotion to the Iraqi Premier League
2	Brusk	6	3	2	1	7	6	+1	11	
3	Akre	6	1	4	1	5	4	+1	7	
4	Azady	6	0	2	4	3	9	−6	2	

Source: IFA official website
Rules for classification: 1) points; 2) goal difference; 3) number of goals scored.
(P) Promoted

=== Group 2 ===
Pos	Team	Pld	W	D	L	GF	GA	GD	Pts	
1	Al-Sulaikh (P)	5	5	0	0	11	3	+8	15	Promotion to the Iraqi Premier League
2	Abu Ghraib	4	2	0	2	6	6	0	6	
3	Al-Ishaqi	3	1	0	2	3	4	−1	3	
4	Al-Shabab	4	0	0	4	3	10	−7	0	

Source: IFA official website
Rules for classification: 1) points; 2) goal difference; 3) number of goals scored.
(P) Promoted

=== Group 3 ===
Pos	Team	Pld	W	D	L	GF	GA	GD	Pts	
1	Al-Amana (P)	4	2	1	1	4	3	+1	7	Promotion to the Iraqi Premier League
2	Al-Kufa	5	2	2	1	7	7	0	8	
3	Al-Hussein	6	2	1	3	8	8	0	7	
4	Al-Qasim	5	1	2	2	5	6	−1	5	

Source: IFA official website
Rules for classification: 1) points; 2) goal difference; 3) number of goals scored.
(P) Promoted

=== Group 4 ===
Pos	Team	Pld	W	D	L	GF	GA	GD	Pts	
1	Al-Shatra (P)	4	3	0	1	4	2	+2	9	Promotion to the Iraqi Premier League
2	Ghaz Al-Junoob	2	2	0	0	4	1	+3	6	
3	Al-Furat	3	0	1	2	1	3	−2	1	
4	Al-Hay	3	0	1	2	1	4	−3	1	

Source: IFA official website
Rules for classification: 1) points; 2) goal difference; 3) number of goals scored.
(P) Promoted

== Semi-finals ==
The two semi-finals winners play in the final match to determine the league champion. The two matches were scheduled to take place on July 26, 2005, but the Football Association decided to postpone them to an unknown time.

Team 1	Score	Team 2
Ararat	v	Al-Amana
Al-Sulaikh	v	Al-Shatra
