= 2011–12 Iraqi First Division League =

Iraqi First Division League
- Season: 2011–12
- Dates: 22 January 2012 – 15 August 2012
- Champions: Sulaymaniya (1st title)
- Promoted: Sulaymaniya; Naft Al-Janoob
- Matches played: 794
- Goals scored: 892 (1.12 per match)

The 2011–12 Iraqi First Division League was the 38th season of what is now called the Iraqi Premier Division League, the second tier of the Iraqi football league system, since its establishment in 1974. The number of clubs in the league have varied throughout history for various reasons. The top two teams in Final round (winner of each group) are promoted to the Iraqi Premier League.

The season began on Sunday 22 January 2012. In the final round, Naft Al-Janoob won the group 1 after facing Al-Mosul, while Sulaymaniya won the group 2 after facing Naft Maysan. Both teams were promoted to the Premier League, and qualified for the final match during which the champion is determined. The final match was scheduled for August 14, 2012 at Al-Shaab Stadium in Baghdad.

In the final match, Sulaymaniya managed to defeat Naft Al-Janoob 2–1 and win the First Division League title.

== First round ==
=== Group 1 (Northern) ===
| Pos | Team | Pld | W | D | L | GF | GA | GD | Pts | |
|---|---|---|---|---|---|---|---|---|---|---|
| 1 | Mosul (Q) | 12 | 8 | 1 | 3 | 19 | 10 | +9 | 25 | Qualification to the Second round |
| 2 | Sulaymaniya (Q) | 12 | 5 | 4 | 3 | 17 | 12 | +5 | 19 | Qualification to the Second round |
| 3 | Ghaz Al-Shamal (Q) | 12 | 5 | 4 | 3 | 12 | 9 | +3 | 19 | Qualification to the Second round |
| 4 | Peshmerga Sulaymaniya | 12 | 6 | 1 | 5 | 11 | 15 | −4 | 19 | |
| 5 | Tuz (R) | 12 | 4 | 3 | 5 | 13 | 12 | +1 | 15 | Relegation to Iraqi Second Division League |
| 6 | Salahaddin (R) | 12 | 3 | 3 | 6 | 9 | 12 | −3 | 12 | Relegation to Iraqi Second Division League |
| 7 | Al-Thawra (R) | 12 | 2 | 2 | 8 | 11 | 22 | −11 | 8 | Relegation to Iraqi Second Division League |

Source: IFA official website
Rules for classification: 1) points; 2) goal difference; 3) number of goals scored.
(Q) Qualified for the phase indicated; (R) Relegated

=== Group 2 (Western and Northeast) ===
| Pos | Team | Pld | W | D | L | GF | GA | GD | Pts | |
|---|---|---|---|---|---|---|---|---|---|---|
| 1 | Samarra (Q) | 13 | 9 | 1 | 3 | 20 | 9 | +11 | 28 | Qualification to the Second round |
| 2 | Al-Anbar (Q) | 13 | 7 | 2 | 4 | 18 | 12 | +6 | 23 | Qualification to the Second round |
| 3 | Al-Ramadi (Q) | 13 | 6 | 4 | 3 | 18 | 11 | +7 | 22 | Qualification to the Second round |
| 4 | Diyala | 13 | 6 | 4 | 3 | 18 | 11 | +7 | 22 | |
| 5 | Umal Nineveh | 13 | 4 | 4 | 5 | 17 | 20 | −3 | 16 | |
| 6 | Jalawla (R) | 13 | 3 | 2 | 8 | 14 | 24 | −10 | 11 | Relegation to Iraqi Second Division League |
| 7 | Nineveh (R) | 7 | 1 | 5 | 1 | 7 | 6 | +1 | 8 | Relegation to Iraqi Second Division League |
| 8 | Al-Falluja (R) | 13 | 1 | 2 | 10 | 7 | 26 | −19 | 5 | Relegation to Iraqi Second Division League |

Source: IFA official website
Rules for classification: 1) points; 2) goal difference; 3) number of goals scored.
(Q) Qualified for the phase indicated; (R) Relegated

=== Group 3 (Baghdad) ===
| Pos | Team | Pld | W | D | L | GF | GA | GD | Pts | |
|---|---|---|---|---|---|---|---|---|---|---|
| 1 | Al-Jaish (Q) | 22 | 10 | 9 | 3 | 27 | 17 | +10 | 39 | Qualification to the Second round |
| 2 | Abu Ghraib (Q) | 22 | 10 | 8 | 4 | 22 | 16 | +6 | 38 | Qualification to the Second round |
| 3 | Al-Khutoot (Q) | 22 | 9 | 9 | 4 | 26 | 19 | +7 | 36 | Qualification to the Second round |
| 4 | Al Najda | 22 | 8 | 10 | 4 | 26 | 20 | +6 | 34 | |
| 5 | Al Kadhimiya | 22 | 8 | 8 | 6 | 31 | 28 | +3 | 32 | |
| 6 | Al Adalah | 22 | 7 | 8 | 7 | 35 | 36 | −1 | 29 | |
| 7 | Al-Sinaat | 22 | 6 | 10 | 6 | 17 | 14 | +3 | 28 | |
| 8 | Biladi (R) | 22 | 6 | 10 | 6 | 23 | 26 | −3 | 28 | Relegation to Iraqi Second Division League |
| 9 | Bareed (R) | 22 | 6 | 7 | 9 | 24 | 26 | −2 | 25 | Relegation to Iraqi Second Division League |
| 10 | Al-Hussein (R) | 22 | 6 | 5 | 11 | 23 | 28 | −5 | 23 | Relegation to Iraqi Second Division League |
| 11 | Al-Shuala (R) | 22 | 4 | 10 | 8 | 18 | 26 | −8 | 22 | Relegation to Iraqi Second Division League |
| 12 | Al-Sulaikh (R) | 22 | 2 | 6 | 14 | 10 | 26 | −16 | 12 | Relegation to Iraqi Second Division League |

Source: IFA official website
Rules for classification: 1) points; 2) goal difference; 3) number of goals scored.
(Q) Qualified for the phase indicated; (R) Relegated

=== Group 4 (Middle Euphrates) ===
| Pos | Team | Pld | W | D | L | GF | GA | GD | Pts | |
|---|---|---|---|---|---|---|---|---|---|---|
| 1 | Al-Samawa (Q) | 18 | 9 | 7 | 2 | 31 | 13 | +18 | 34 | Qualification to the Second round |
| 2 | Al-Hindiya (Q) | 18 | 10 | 4 | 4 | 22 | 14 | +8 | 34 | Qualification to the Second round |
| 3 | Naft Al-Wasat (Q) | 18 | 8 | 6 | 4 | 18 | 12 | +6 | 30 | Qualification to the Second round |
| 4 | Al-Kufa | 18 | 8 | 5 | 5 | 20 | 13 | +7 | 29 | |
| 5 | Al-Diwaniya | 18 | 7 | 5 | 6 | 11 | 14 | −3 | 26 | |
| 6 | Al Madhatyia | 18 | 6 | 7 | 5 | 15 | 18 | −3 | 25 | |
| 7 | Babil | 18 | 5 | 6 | 7 | 15 | 16 | −1 | 21 | |
| 8 | Al-Ettifaq (R) | 18 | 6 | 2 | 10 | 17 | 23 | −6 | 20 | Relegation to Iraqi Second Division League |
| 9 | Al-Rawdhatain (R) | 18 | 3 | 4 | 11 | 15 | 25 | −10 | 14 (Note: 1 bonus point?) | Relegation to Iraqi Second Division League |
| 10 | Al-Sadda (R) | 18 | 2 | 6 | 10 | 7 | 23 | −16 | 12 | Relegation to Iraqi Second Division League |

Source: IFA official website
Rules for classification: 1) points; 2) goal difference; 3) number of goals scored.
(Q) Qualified for the phase indicated; (R) Relegated

=== Group 5 (Southern) ===
| Pos | Team | Pld | W | D | L | GF | GA | GD | Pts | |
|---|---|---|---|---|---|---|---|---|---|---|
| 1 | Naft Al-Janoob (Q) | 18 | 15 | 2 | 1 | 54 | 9 | +45 | 47 | Qualification to the Second round |
| 2 | Naft Maysan (Q) | 18 | 11 | 4 | 3 | 32 | 14 | +18 | 37 | Qualification to the Second round |
| 3 | Masafi Al-Janoob (Q) | 18 | 8 | 7 | 3 | 26 | 14 | +12 | 31 | Qualification to the Second round |
| 4 | Al-Amara | 18 | 7 | 6 | 5 | 21 | 21 | 0 | 27 | |
| 5 | Al-Nasiriya | 18 | 7 | 3 | 8 | 24 | 23 | +1 | 24 | |
| 6 | Al-Bahri | 18 | 7 | 3 | 8 | 33 | 35 | −2 | 24 | |
| 7 | Maysan (R) | 18 | 5 | 5 | 8 | 15 | 20 | −5 | 20 | Relegation to Iraqi Second Division League |
| 8 | Al-Hay (R) | 18 | 5 | 5 | 8 | 19 | 27 | −8 | 20 | Relegation to Iraqi Second Division League |
| 9 | Al-Nahrain (R) | 18 | 5 | 2 | 11 | 16 | 36 | −20 | 17 | Relegation to Iraqi Second Division League |
| 10 | Al-Qurna (R) | 18 | 1 | 1 | 16 | 5 | 46 | −41 | 4 | Relegation to Iraqi Second Division League |

Source: IFA official website
Rules for classification: 1) points; 2) goal difference; 3) number of goals scored.
(Q) Qualified for the phase indicated; (R) Relegated

== Second round ==
=== Group 1 ===
| Pos | Team | Pld | W | D | L | GF | GA | GD | Pts | |
|---|---|---|---|---|---|---|---|---|---|---|
| 1 | Sulaymaniya (Q) | 8 | 5 | 1 | 2 | 19 | 15 | +4 | 16 | Qualification to the Final round |
| 2 | Al-Mosul (Q) | 8 | 4 | 2 | 2 | 15 | 7 | +8 | 14 | Qualification to the Final round |
| 3 | Samarra | 8 | 4 | 2 | 2 | 8 | 7 | +1 | 14 | |
| 4 | Ghaz Al-Shamal | 8 | 1 | 4 | 3 | 14 | 16 | −2 | 7 | |
| 5 | Al-Anbar | 8 | 1 | 1 | 6 | 11 | 22 | −11 | 4 | |

Source: IFA official website
Rules for classification: 1) points; 2) goal difference; 3) number of goals scored.
(Q) Qualified for the phase indicated

=== Group 2 ===
| Pos | Team | Pld | W | D | L | GF | GA | GD | Pts | |
|---|---|---|---|---|---|---|---|---|---|---|
| 1 | Naft Al-Janoob (Q) | 8 | 7 | 1 | 0 | 20 | 6 | +14 | 22 | Qualification to the Final round |
| 2 | Naft Maysan (Q) | 8 | 5 | 0 | 3 | 18 | 10 | +8 | 15 | Qualification to the Final round |
| 3 | Naft Al-Wasat | 8 | 4 | 0 | 4 | 11 | 11 | 0 | 12 | |
| 4 | Al-Samawa | 8 | 2 | 2 | 4 | 6 | 12 | −6 | 8 | |
| 5 | Masafi Al-Janoob | 8 | 0 | 1 | 7 | 5 | 21 | −16 | 1 | |

Source: IFA official website
Rules for classification: 1) points; 2) goal difference; 3) number of goals scored.
(Q) Qualified for the phase indicated

=== Group 3 ===
| Pos | Team | Pld | W | D | L | GF | GA | GD | Pts | |
|---|---|---|---|---|---|---|---|---|---|---|
| 1 | Al-Jaish (Q) | 7 | 4 | 1 | 2 | 12 | 3 | +9 | 13 | Qualification to the Final round |
| 2 | Al-Ramadi (Q) | 7 | 4 | 1 | 2 | 13 | 9 | +4 | 13 | Qualification to the Final round |
| 3 | Al-Hindiya | 7 | 4 | 1 | 2 | 9 | 9 | 0 | 13 | |
| 4 | Al-Khutoot | 7 | 1 | 1 | 5 | 6 | 17 | −11 | 4 | |
| 5 | Abu Ghraib | 4 | 1 | 0 | 3 | 3 | 5 | −2 | 3 | |

Source: IFA official website
Rules for classification: 1) points; 2) goal difference; 3) number of goals scored.
(Q) Qualified for the phase indicated

== Final round ==
=== Group 1 ===
| Pos | Team | Pld | W | D | L | GF | GA | GD | Pts | Qualification |
|---|---|---|---|---|---|---|---|---|---|---|
| 1 | Naft Al-Janoob (P) | 2 | 1 | 1 | 0 | 4 | 3 | +1 | 4 | Promotion to the Iraqi Premier League |
| 2 | Al-Jaish | 2 | 1 | 0 | 1 | 2 | 2 | 0 | 3 | |
| 3 | Mosul | 2 | 0 | 1 | 1 | 2 | 3 | −1 | 1 | |

Source: IFA official website
Rules for classification: 1) points; 2) goal difference; 3) number of goals scored.
(P) Promoted

=== Group 2 ===
| Pos | Team | Pld | W | D | L | GF | GA | GD | Pts | Qualification |
|---|---|---|---|---|---|---|---|---|---|---|
| 1 | Sulaymaniya (C, P) | 2 | 1 | 1 | 0 | 3 | 2 | +1 | 4 | Promotion to the Iraqi Premier League |
| 2 | Naft Maysan | 2 | 1 | 0 | 1 | 8 | 1 | +7 | 3 | |
| 3 | Al-Ramadi | 2 | 0 | 1 | 1 | 2 | 10 | −8 | 1 | |

Source: IFA official website
Rules for classification: 1) points; 2) goal difference; 3) number of goals scored.
(C) Champions; (P) Promoted

== Final match ==
15 August 2012

| Sulaymaniya | 2–1 | Naft Al-Janoob |

Al-Shaab Stadium, Baghdad
