= Al-Maimouna Stadium =

Stadium in Maysan, Iraq

- ملعب الميمونة
- Interactive map of Al-Maimouna Stadium
- Location: Al-Maimouna, Maysan, Iraq
- Coordinates: 31°41′21.3″N 46°58′11.5″E
- Owner: Ministry of Youth and Sports
- Capacity: 2,000
- Field size: 105 by 68 metres (114.8 yd × 74.4 yd)

Construction
- Opened: 2012
- Cost: 5.6 billion IQD

Tenants
- Maysan FC, Al-Maimouna SC

Al-Maimouna Stadium (Arabic: ملعب الميمونة) is a multi-purpose stadium in Maysan, Iraq. It is currently used mostly for football matches and is the home stadium of Maysan FC. Opened in 2012, it has a seating capacity of 2,000 people.

== See also ==
- List of football stadiums in Iraq
