= 2012–13 Iraqi First Division League =

Iraqi First Division League
- Season: 2012–13
- Champions: Al-Karkh (1st title)
- Promoted: Al-Karkh; Naft Maysan
- Matches played: 85
- Goals scored: 168 (1.98 per match)
- Biggest home win: Naft Maysan 4-0 Salahaddin
- Biggest away win: Al-Adala 1-5 Naft Maysan
- Highest scoring: Al-Karkh 5-2 Salahaddin
- All statistics correct as of 24 August 2013.

The 2012–13 Iraqi First Division League season began on December 8, 2012. Sulaymaniya were the champions of the previous season and Naft Al-Junoob were runners-up, hence both promoted to the 2012–13 Iraqi Premier League.

== Format and teams ==
Location of the teams for the 2012–13 season

The 42 teams were split into six groups. At the end of the regular season, the top 2 teams from each group, a total of 12 teams advanced to the next round. In the second round, these 12 teams will be split into two groups of 6, with teams playing a home and away round robin matches with each opponent in the group. The top two teams in each of the two groups advanced to the next round creating a 4 team playoff. The Final stage is one group with teams playing a home and away round robin matches with each opponent in the group. The top two teams qualify to the 2013–14 Iraqi Premier League next season.

Governorate	Teams	Name of Teams
Center
Baghdad	4	Al-Adala, Al-Hudood, Al-Jaish, and Al-Karkh
Salahaddin	4	Salahaddin, Samaraa, Al-Shirqat, and Al-Tuz
Middle Euphrates
Muthana	1	Al-Samawa
Najaf	2	Al-Kufa and Naft Al-Wasat
South
Maysan	1	Naft Maysan

== Groups stage ==
=== Group 1 ===
Pos	Team	Pld	W	D	L	GF	GA	GD	Pts	Qualification
1	Naft Maysan (A)	9	6	2	1	25	11	+14	20	Qualification for Iraqi First Division League Final Stage
2	Al-Tuz (A)	9	6	1	2	14	11	+3	19	Qualification for Iraqi First Division League Final Stage
3	Samaraa	8	3	3	2	9	9	0	12	
4	Al-Hudood	8	2	4	2	6	6	0	10	
5	Al-Kufa	8	1	3	4	10	14	−4	6	
6	Al-Adala	8	0	1	7	4	17	−13	1	

Updated to match(es) played on 30 June 2013. Source: Goalzz.com
Rules for classification: 1) points; 2) goal difference; 3) number of goals scored.
(A) Advance to a further round

Home \ Away	ADA	HUD	KUF	NFM	SMR	TUZ
Al-Adala		1–2	1–1	1–5		0–1
Al-Hudood	1–0				1–1	1–1
Al-Kufa		1–0		2–4	1–2	2–3
Naft Maysan	3–0	1–1	1–1		4–2	4–1
Samaraa	1–0	0–0	0–0	2–1		
Al-Tuz	3–1	1–0	2–1	1–2	1–0	

Updated to match(es) played on 25 June 2013. Source: Goalzz.com
Legend: Blue = home team win; Yellow = draw; Red = away team win.

=== Group 2 ===
Pos	Team	Pld	W	D	L	GF	GA	GD	Pts	Qualification
1	Al-Karkh (A)	10	5	4	1	14	8	+6	19	Qualification for Iraqi First Division League Final Stage
2	Salahaddin (A)	10	5	4	1	8	2	+6	19	Qualification for Iraqi First Division League Final Stage
3	Al-Shirqat	10	4	4	2	17	10	+7	16	
4	Naft Al-Wasat	9	1	5	3	9	14	−5	8	
5	Al-Jaish	9	1	5	3	10	11	−1	8	
6	Al-Samawa	8	0	2	6	3	16	−13	2	

Updated to match(es) played on 8 July 2013. Source: Goalzz.com
Rules for classification: 1) points; 2) goal difference; 3) number of goals scored.
(A) Advance to a further round

Home \ Away	JAI	KAR	NFW	SAL	SMA	SHQ
Al-Jaish		1–3	1–1	0–0		1–1
Al-Karkh	2–1		2–2	0–0	2–0	2–0
Naft Al-Wasat	1–1	1–1		0–1		3–1
Salahaddin	1–0	0–0	3–0		2–0	0–2
Al-Samawa	0–3	0–2	1–1	0–1		2–2
Al-Shirqat	2–2	3–0	3–0	0–0	3–0	

Updated to match(es) played on 30 June 2013. Source: Goalzz.com
Legend: Blue = home team win; Yellow = draw; Red = away team win.

== Final stage ==
The Final stage is one group with teams playing a home and away round robin matches with each opponent in the group. The top two teams qualify to the 2013–14 Iraqi Premier League next season.

Pos	Team	Pld	W	D	L	GF	GA	GD	Pts	Promotion
1	Al-Karkh (C, P)	6	4	2	0	16	7	+9	14	Promotion to the Iraqi Premier League
2	Naft Maysan (P)	6	2	2	2	11	7	+4	8	Promotion to the Iraqi Premier League
3	Salahaddin	6	1	3	2	6	12	−6	6	
4	Al-Tuz	6	1	1	4	6	13	−7	4	

Updated to match(es) played on 14 August 2013. Source: Goalzz.com
Rules for classification: 1) points; 2) goal difference; 3) number of goals scored.
(C) Champions; (P) Promoted

Home \ Away	KAR	NFM	SAL	TUZ
Al-Karkh		2–1	5–2	3–1
Naft Maysan	2–2		4–0	3–1
Salahaddin	0–0	1–1		2–1
Al-Tuz	1–4	1–0	1–1	

Updated to match(es) played on 14 August 2013. Source: Goalzz.com
Legend: Blue = home team win; Yellow = draw; Red = away team win.

== See also ==
- 2012–13 Iraqi Premier League
- 2012–13 Iraq FA Cup
