= Al-Maimouna SC =

Iraqi football club

- Full name: Al-Maimouna Sport Club
- Founded: 1993; 32 years ago
- Ground: Al-Maimouna Stadium
- Capacity: 2,000
- Chairman: Wael Salman
- Manager: Hussein Radhi
- League: Iraqi Third Division League
Home colours	Away colours

Al-Maimouna Sport Club (Arabic: نادي الميمونة الرياضي), is an Iraqi football team based in Al-Maimouna District, Maysan, that plays in the Iraqi Third Division League.

== Managerial history ==
- (Iraq) Hussein Radhi

== See also ==
- 2021–22 Iraqi Second Division League
