= Taza SC =

Iraqi football club

- Full name: Taza Sport Club
- Founded: 2015; 10 years ago
- Ground: Taza Stadium
- Capacity: 1,000
- Chairman: Salah Mardan Ali
- Manager: Mohammed Qurrah
- League: Iraqi Third Division League
Home colours	Away colours

Taza Sport Club (Arabic: نادي تازة الرياضي), is an Iraqi football team based in Taza Khurmatu, Kirkuk, that plays in Iraqi Third Division League.

== Stadium ==
In February 2014, the Ministry of Youth and Sports opened the Taza stadium, with a capacity of 1,000 spectators, and an opening match was held between Taza and Tuz.

== Managerial history ==
- (Iraq) Mohammed Akbar
- (Iraq) Adel Shakour
- (Iraq) Mohammed Qurrah

== See also ==
- 2019–20 Iraq FA Cup
- 2020–21 Iraq FA Cup
