= Al-Zehirat SC =

Iraqi football club

- Full name: Al-Zehirat Sport Club
- Founded: 2004; 22 years ago
- Ground: Al-Zehirat Stadium
- Chairman: Fadhel Hadi
- Manager: Mohammed Zaaki
- League: Iraqi Third Division League
Home colours	Away colours

Al-Zehirat Sport Club (Arabic: نادي الزهيرات الرياضي), is an Iraqi football team based in Diyala, that plays in Iraqi Third Division League.

== Managerial history ==
- (Iraq) Mohammed Zaaki

== See also ==
- 2021–22 Iraqi Third Division League
