= Al-Nasr SC (Iraq) =

Iraqi football club

- Full name: Al-Nasr Sport Club
- Founded: 1992; 33 years ago
- Ground: Al-Nasr Stadium
- Chairman: Hafidh Naeem Howaidi
- Manager: Mohsin Abu Ragheef
- League: Iraqi Third Division League
Home colours	Away colours

Al-Nasr Sport Club (Arabic: نادي النصر الرياضي), is an Iraqi football team based in Dhi Qar, that plays in Iraqi Third Division League.

== Managerial history ==
- (Iraq) Mohsin Abu Ragheef

== See also ==
- 2021–22 Iraqi Third Division League
