= Shorija SC =

Iraqi football club

- Full name: Shorija Sport Club
- Founded: 2003; 22 years ago
- Ground: Shorija Stadium
- Chairman: Ridha Faeq Zangana
- Manager: Ali Abdul-Qader
- League: Iraqi Third Division League
Home colours	Away colours

Shorija Sport Club (Arabic: نادي شورجة الرياضي), is an Iraqi football team based in Kirkuk, that plays in Iraqi Third Division League and Kurdistan Premier League.

== Managerial history ==
- (Iraq) Ali Abdul-Qader

== Honours ==
=== Domestic ===
- Kurdistan Third Division League
  - Winners (1): 2013–14
