= Al-Junoob SC =

Iraqi football club

- Full name: Al-Junoob Sport Club
- Founded: 1952; 74 years ago
- Ground: Al-Junoob Club stadium
- Capacity: 1,000
- Chairman: Hashim Sharif al-Musawi
- League: Iraqi Third Division League
Home colours	Away colours

Al-Junoob Sport Club (Arabic: نادي الجنوب الرياضي), is an Iraqi football club based in Basra, that plays in Iraqi Third Division League.

== History ==
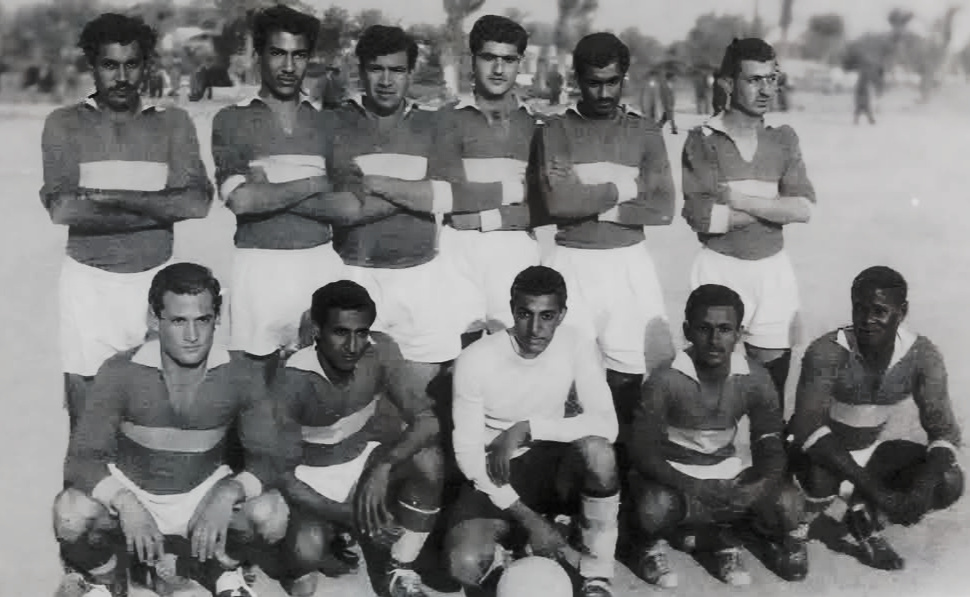
Al-Junoob squad in 1958

Al-Junoob Sports Club was founded in 1952 by Mr. Abboud Al Shubbar, who was chosen as the club president at the beginning of its foundation by members of the General Assembly, which was made up of 72 members. Then Mr. Kadhim Jbarah became the club's president from 1953 to 1969, during which time sports teams were formed: football, basketball, volleyball, boxing, weightlifting, bodybuilding, table tennis, badminton, and cycling team, with the number of club members increasing to 250. In the 1980s, women's sports teams were formed.

== Stadium ==
In 2015, the club's building and infrastructures were rebuilt, including the rehabilitation of the Al-Junoob stadium with a capacity of 1,000 spectators.

== See also ==
- 2000–01 Iraqi Elite League
