= Al-Radd SC =

Iraqi football club

- Full name: Al-Radd Sport Club
- Founded: 2022; 4 years ago as Al-Radd Al-Sariea
- Ground: Abtal Al-Madina Stadium
- Owner: Ministry of Interior
- Chairman: Thamir Mohammed Ismail
- Manager: Ali Musa Al-Kaabi
- League: Iraqi Second Division League
Home colours	Away colours

Al-Radd Sport Club (Arabic: نادي الرد الرياضي), is an Iraqi football team based in Baghdad, that plays in the Iraqi Second Division League.

== History ==
The Al-Radd Al-Sariea football team was established (as a team) several years before the founding of the club, and it was among the teams that played in the Interior Minister Cup in 2019.

On March 7, 2022, the Al-Radd Al-Sariea Club was established, and received direct support from the Ministry of Youth and Sports. It is a multi-sports club, which includes about 20 teams in various sports.

The football team played in the first season 2022–23 in the Iraqi Third Division League, the Baghdad Group 1, consisting of 6 teams, and performed well, as it continued to be at the top of the group, until the last match against Biladi, where it defeated it with a very big score (10–2), and was promoted to the Iraqi Second Division League.

In April 2023, the clubs associated with the Ministry of Interior were dissolved, with the exception of three clubs: Al-Shorta, Al-Hudood, and Aliyat Al-Shorta, but under the influence of the club president, commander of the Rapid Response Forces, Al-Radd Al-Sariea Club was maintained and not dissolved, and it participated in the Iraqi Second Division League. The club changed its name from Al-Radd Al-Sariea to Al-Radd at the end of 2023.

== Managerial history ==
- (Iraq) Ali Musa Al-Kaabi

== See also ==
- 2022–23 Iraqi Third Division League
- 2023–24 Iraqi Second Division League
