= Rabia SC =

- Full name: Rabia Sport Club
- Founded: 1994; 31 years ago
- League: Iraqi Third Division League

Rabia Sport Club (Arabic: نادي ربيعة الرياضي), is an Iraqi football team based in Tel Afar District, Nineveh, that plays in the Iraqi Third Division League.

== See also ==
- 2020–21 Iraq FA Cup
