= Al-Mustaqbal Al-Mushriq SC =

Iraqi football club

- Full name: Al-Mustaqbal Al-Mushriq Sport Club
- Founded: 2005; 20 years ago
- Ground: Al-Dawasa Stadium
- Chairman: Sharqi Al-Zibari
- Manager: Ali Zuhair
- League: Iraqi Third Division League
Home colours	Away colours

Al-Mustaqbal Al-Mushriq Sport Club (Arabic: نادي المستقبل المشرق الرياضي), is an Iraqi football team based in Nineveh, that plays in Iraqi Third Division League.

== Managerial history ==
- (Iraq) Ali Zuhair

== See also ==
- 2021–22 Iraq FA Cup
