= Al-Shaheed Arkan SC =

Iraqi football club

- Full name: Al-Shaheed Arkan Sport Club
- Founded: 1993; 32 years ago
- Ground: Al-Shaheed Arkan Stadium
- Chairman: Ayad Abdul-Karim
- Manager: Hadi Mijbel
- League: Iraqi Third Division League
Home colours	Away colours

Al-Shaheed Arkan Sport Club (Arabic: نادي الشهيد أركان الرياضي), is an Iraqi football team based in Diyala, that plays in Iraqi Third Division League.

== Managerial history ==
- (Iraq) Hadi Mijbel

== See also ==
- 2000–01 Iraqi Elite League
