= Al-Fotuwa SC (Iraq) =

Iraqi football club

- Full name: Al-Fotuwa Sport Club
- Founded: 1960; 65 years ago
- Ground: Al-Fotuwa Stadium
- Chairman: Nawfel Mohammed
- Manager: Mowaffaq Mahmoud
- League: Iraqi Third Division League
Home colours	Away colours

Al-Fotuwa Sport Club (Arabic: نادي الفتوة الرياضي), is an Iraqi football team based in Mosul, that plays in the Iraqi Third Division League.

== Managerial history ==
- (Iraq) Mowaffaq Mahmoud

== See also ==
- 1988–89 Iraq FA Cup
- 2021–22 Iraqi Second Division League
