= Al-Ghadeer SC =

Iraqi football club

- Full name: Al-Ghadeer Sport Club
- Founded: 2003; 22 years ago
- Ground: Al-Ghadeer Stadium
- Chairman: Riyadh Bander Jassim
- Manager: Amir Abdul-Hussein
- League: Iraqi Third Division League
Home colours	Away colours

Al-Ghadeer Sport Club (Arabic: نادي الغدير الرياضي), is an Iraqi football team based in Karbala, that plays in the Iraqi Third Division League.

== Managerial history ==
- (Iraq) Amir Abdul-Hussein

== See also ==
- 2021–22 Iraqi Third Division League
