= Ghammas SC =

Iraqi football club

- Full name: Ghammas Sport Club
- Founded: 1990; 35 years ago
- Ground: Ghammas Stadium
- Chairman: Ismail Haji
- Manager: Mohammed Hadi
- League: Iraqi Third Division League
Home colours	Away colours

Ghammas Sport Club (Arabic: نادي غماس الرياضي) is an Iraqi football team based in Ghammas, Al-Qādisiyyah, that plays in Iraqi Third Division League.

== Stadium ==
In May 2008, the Ministry of Youth and Sports began construction of the Ghammas stadium.

== Managerial history ==
- (Iraq) Mohammed Hadi

== See also ==
- 2000–01 Iraqi Elite League
- 2001–02 Iraq FA Cup
