= Al-Ahrar SC =

Iraqi football club

- Full name: Al-Ahrar Football Club
- Founded: 2003; 22 years ago
- Ground: Al-Kut Olympic Stadium (temporary use)
- Capacity: 20,000
- Chairman: Faisal Nafea Khesbag
- Manager: Murtadha Al-Hajji
- League: Iraqi Third Division League
Home colours	Away colours

Al-Ahrar Sport Club (Arabic: نادي الأحرار الرياضي), is an Iraqi football team based in Wasit, that plays in Iraqi Third Division League.

== Managerial history ==
- (Iraq) Riyadh Sada
- (Iraq) Ali Radhi
- (Iraq) Taha Arad Jabbar
- (Iraq) Saad Rabeh
- (Iraq) Murtadha Al-Hajji

== See also ==
- 2021–22 Iraq FA Cup
