= Al-Wajihiya SC =

Iraqi football club

- Full name: Al-Wajihiya Sport Club
- Founded: 2004; 21 years ago
- Ground: Al-Wajihiya Stadium
- Chairman: Ibrahim Hikmat Al-Rubaiee
- Manager: Mohammed Hassan Jarallah
- League: Iraqi Third Division League
Home colours	Away colours

Al-Wajihiya Sport Club (Arabic: نادي الوجيهية الرياضي), is an Iraqi football team based in Diyala, that plays in Iraqi Third Division League.

== Managerial history ==
- (Iraq) Mohammed Hassan Jarallah

== See also ==
- 2020–21 Iraq FA Cup
