= Dhi Qar SC =

Iraqi football club

- Full name: Dhi Qar Sport Club
- Founded: 1991; 34 years ago
- Ground: Dhi Qar Stadium
- Chairman: Adnan Abid Kedar
- Manager: Jalil Ibrahim
- League: Iraqi Third Division League
Home colours	Away colours

Dhi Qar Sport Club (Arabic: نادي ذي قار الرياضي) is an Iraqi football team based in Dhi Qar, that plays in Iraqi Third Division League.

== Managerial history ==
- (Iraq) Jalil Ibrahim

== See also ==
- 2021–22 Iraqi Third Division League
