= Al-Habbaniya SC =

Iraqi football club

- Full name: Al-Habbaniya Sport Club
- Founded: 1991; 35 years ago
- Ground: Al-Habbaniya Stadium
- Chairman: Abed Farhan Hayef
- Manager: Shaker Mohammed Sabbar
- League: Iraqi Third Division League
| Home colours | Away colours |

Al-Habbaniya Sport Club (Arabic: نادي الحبانية الرياضي), is an Iraqi football team based in Al-Habbaniya, Al-Anbar, that plays in Iraqi Third Division League.

== Managerial history ==
- (Iraq) Hadi Saleh Al-Azzawy
- (Iraq) Yasser Salman
- (Iraq) Saad Nasser
- (Iraq) Qusay Khamis
- (Iraq) Shaker Mohammed Sabbar

== See also ==
- 2021–22 Iraq FA Cup
