= Shabab Al-Dawr SC =

Iraqi football club

- Full name: Shabab Al-Dawr Sport Club
- Founded: 1987; 39 years ago
- Ground: Al-Dawr Stadium
- Chairman: Lateef Ahmed
- Manager: Ashraf Kamil Abbas
- League: Iraqi Third Division League
Home colours	Away colours

Shabab Al-Dawr Sport Club (Arabic: نادي شباب الدور الرياضي) is an Iraqi football team based in Saladin, that plays in Iraqi Third Division League.

== Managerial history ==
- (Iraq) Adel Aoni Salih
- (Iraq) Majed Hameed
- (Iraq) Ashraf Kamil Abbas

== Honours ==
- Iraqi First Division League (third tier)
  - Winners: 2006–07

== See also ==
- 1992–93 Iraq FA Cup
- 2001–02 Iraq FA Cup
- 2002–03 Iraq FA Cup
- 2016–17 Iraq FA Cup
