= Baladiyat Al-Nasiriya SC =

Iraqi football club

- Full name: Baladiyat Al-Nasiriya Sport Club
- Founded: 2013; 12 years ago
- Ground: Al-Hawi Stadium
- Chairman: Moayad Kadhim
- Manager: Jalil Ibrahim
- League: Iraqi Third Division League
| Home colours | Away colours |

Baladiyat Al-Nasiriya Sport Club (Arabic: نادي بلدية الناصرية الرياضي), is an Iraqi football team based in Al-Nasiriyah, Dhi Qar, that plays in Iraqi Third Division League.

== Managerial history ==
- (Iraq) Salem Jamil
- (Iraq) Jalil Ibrahim

== See also ==
- 2018–19 Iraq FA Cup
- 2019–20 Iraq FA Cup
- 2021–22 Iraq FA Cup
