= Al-Noor SC (Iraq) =

Iraqi football club

- Full name: Al-Noor Sport Club
- Founded: 2016; 10 years ago
- Ground: Al-Noor stadium
- Chairman: Safaa Salih
- League: Iraqi Third Division League
Home colours	Away colours

Al-Noor Sport Club (Arabic: نادي النور الرياضي), is an Iraqi football team based in Abu Al-Khaseeb, Basra, that plays in Iraqi Third Division League.

== History ==
Al-Noor Club was established in 2016 in Abu Al-Khaseeb, Basra. On October 23, 2017, he held his first administrative body election after the end of his constituent body term, where he won the position of club president Safaa Salih.

== See also ==
- 2019–20 Iraq FA Cup
