= Al-Dibis SC =

Iraqi football club

- Full name: Al-Dibis Sport Club
- Founded: 1991; 34 years ago as Kahrabaa Al-Dibis
- Ground: Al-Dibis Stadium
- Chairman: Mowaffaq Noureddine
- Manager: Ghassan Mohammed
- League: Iraqi Third Division League
Home colours	Away colours

Al-Dibis Sport Club (Arabic: نادي الدبس الرياضي), is an Iraqi football team based in Dibis District, Kirkuk, that plays in Iraqi Third Division League.

== Managerial history ==
- (Iraq) Abbas Rasheed
- (Iraq) Ghassan Mohammed

== Famous players ==
- (Iraq) Younis Mahmoud (1997–1999)

== See also ==
- 2001–02 Iraq FA Cup
- 2020–21 Iraq FA Cup
