= Abnaa Al-Madina SC =

Iraqi football club

- Full name: Abnaa Al-Madina Sport Club
- Founded: 2021; 4 years ago
- Ground: Natiq Hashim Stadium
- Chairman: Qais Hamel Al-Saedi
- Manager: Saddam Al-Rubaie
- League: Iraqi Third Division League
Home colours	Away colours

Abnaa Al-Madina Sport Club (Arabic: نادي أبناء المدينة الرياضي), is an Iraqi football team based in Sadr City, Baghdad, that plays in Iraqi Third Division League.

== Managerial history ==
- (Iraq) Khalaf Habash
- (Iraq) Salam Tuaima
- (Iraq) Saddam Al-Rubaie

== See also ==
- 2021–22 Iraqi Third Division League
- 2022–23 Iraqi Second Division League
