= Al-Izza SC =

Iraqi football club

- Full name: Al-Izza Sport Club
- Founded: 1967; 58 years ago
- Ground: Al-Izza Stadium
- Chairman: Naeem Saeed Al-Abedi
- Manager: Ali Jawad Al-Aboudi
- League: Iraqi Third Division League
Home colours	Away colours

Al-Izza Sport Club (Arabic: نادي العزة الرياضي), is an Iraqi football team based in Wasit, that plays in Iraqi Third Division League.

== Managerial history ==
- (Iraq) Hassan Naeem
- (Iraq) Majed Al-Badri
- (Iraq) Haider Ibrahim
- (Iraq) Ali Jawad Al-Aboudi

== See also ==
- 2021–22 Iraqi Third Division League
