= Al-Khor SC (Iraq) =

Iraqi football club

- Full name: Al-Khor Sport Club
- Founded: 1993; 32 years ago
- Ground: Al-Khor stadium
- Chairman: Safaa Badil
- Manager: Hadeer Al-Asadi
- League: Iraqi Third Division League
Home colours	Away colours

Al-Khor Sport Club (Arabic: نادي الخور الرياضي), is an Iraqi football team based in Khor Al Zubair, Basra, that plays in Iraqi Third Division League.

== Managerial history ==
- (Iraq) Hadeer Al-Asadi

== See also ==
- 2000–01 Iraqi Elite League
