= Balad Ruz SC =

Iraqi football club

- Full name: Balad Ruz Sport Club
- Founded: 1991; 34 years ago
- Ground: Balad Ruz Stadium
- Chairman: Radhi Abbas
- Manager: Hameed Abid Hassan
- League: Iraqi Third Division League
Home colours	Away colours

Balad Ruz Sport Club (Arabic: نادي بلدروز الرياضي) is an Iraqi football team based in Balad Ruz, Diyala, that plays in Iraqi Third Division League.

== Managerial history ==
- (Iraq) Hameed Abid Hassan

== See also ==
- 2000–01 Iraqi Elite League
- 2020–21 Iraq FA Cup
- 2021–22 Iraq FA Cup
