= Baiji SC =

Iraqi football club

- Full name: Baiji Sport Club
- Nickname(s): Al-Qalaa Al-Baydhaa (White Castle)
- Founded: 1988; 37 years ago
- Ground: Baiji Stadium
- Chairman: Abid Al-Awadh
- Manager: Mahmoud Saadoun
- League: Iraqi Third Division League
Home colours	Away colours

Baiji Sport Club (Arabic: نادي بيجي الرياضي) is an Iraqi football team based in Saladin, that plays in Iraqi Third Division League.

== Stadium ==
In August 2021, the Ministry of Youth and Sports decided to restore and rehabilitate Baiji Stadium, after it had been destroyed by ISIS in previous years.

== Managerial history ==
- (Iraq) Mahmoud Saadoun

== Famous players ==
- (Iraq) Raad Fanar

== See also ==
- 2000–01 Iraqi Elite League
- 2021–22 Iraqi Second Division League
