= Hit SC =

Iraqi football club

- Full name: Hit Sport Club
- Founded: 1991; 34 years ago
- Ground: Hit Stadium
- Chairman: Abdul-Hamid Abdul-Azeez
- Manager: Faleh Munif Moajel
- League: Iraqi Third Division League
Home colours	Away colours

Hit Sport Club (Arabic: نادي هيت الرياضي), is an Iraqi football team based in Hit District, Al-Anbar, that plays in Iraqi Third Division League.

== Managerial history ==
- (Iraq) Faleh Munif Moajel

== See also ==
- 2020–21 Iraq FA Cup
