= Al-Ghadhriya SC =

Iraqi football club

- Full name: Al-Ghadhriya Sport Club
- Founded: 1975; 51 years ago
- Ground: Al-Ghadhriya Stadium
- Chairman: Nour Al-Araji
- Manager: Khaled Waleed
- League: Iraqi Third Division League
Home colours	Away colours

Al-Ghadhriya Sport Club (Arabic: نادي الغاضرية الرياضي), is an Iraqi football team based in Karbalaa, that plays in Iraqi Third Division League.

== Managerial history ==
- (Iraq) Maitham Da’i al-Haq
- (Iraq) Khaled Waleed

== See also ==
- 2016–17 Iraq FA Cup
- 2020–21 Iraq FA Cup
- 2021–22 Iraq FA Cup
