= Al-Hamza SC =

Iraqi football club

- Full name: Al-Hamza Sport Club
- Founded: 1968; 57 years ago
- Ground: Al-Hamza Stadium
- Chairman: Tamkeen Al Orfi
- Manager: Hashim Ariouch
- League: Iraqi Third Division League
Home colours	Away colours

Al-Hamza Sport Club (Arabic: نادي الحمزة الرياضي), is an Iraqi football team based in Al-Hamza Al-Sharqi, Al-Qādisiyyah, that plays in Iraqi Third Division League.

== Managerial history ==
- (Iraq) Zaman Ghanim
- (Iraq) Hashim Ariouch

== See also ==
- 2001–02 Iraq FA Cup
- 2002–03 Iraq FA Cup
- 2019–20 Iraq FA Cup
