= Al-Midaina SC =

Iraqi football club

- Full name: Al-Midaina Sport Club
- Founded: 2000; 26 years ago
- Ground: Al-Midaina Stadium
- Chairman: Ismail Jawad Kadhim
- Manager: Khalil Kadhim Falhi
- League: Iraqi Third Division League
Home colours	Away colours

Al-Midaina Sport Club (Arabic: نادي المِدَينة الرياضي) is an Iraqi football team based in Al-Midaina, Basra, that plays in Iraqi Third Division League.

== Managerial history ==
- (Iraq) Hameed Eqab
- (Iraq) Tariq Fartous
- (Iraq) Khalil Kadhim Falhi

== See also ==
- 2000–01 Iraqi Elite League
- 2021–22 Iraq FA Cup
