= Al-Mahanawiya SC =

Iraqi football club

- Full name: Al-Mahanawiya Sport Club
- Founded: 1999; 26 years ago
- Ground: Al-Shafieya Stadium
- Chairman: Fayez Hassan Al-Bdairy
- Manager: Hassan Faleh
- League: Iraqi Third Division League
Home colours	Away colours

Al-Mahanawiya Sport Club (Arabic: نادي المهناوية الرياضي) is an Iraqi football team based in Al-Qādisiyyah, that plays in Iraqi Third Division League.

== Managerial history ==
- (Iraq) Hassan Faleh

== See also ==
- 2002–03 Iraq FA Cup
