= Uruk SC =

Iraqi football club

- Full name: Uruk Sport Club
- Founded: 2003; 22 years ago
- Ground: Uruk Stadium
- Chairman: Majed Al-Hassani
- Manager: Mohammed Zuhair
- League: Iraqi Third Division League
Home colours	Away colours

Uruk Sport Club (Arabic: نادي أوروك الرياضي), is an Iraqi football team based in Al-Muthanna.

== Managerial history ==
- (Iraq) Mohammed Zuhair

== See also ==
- 2020–21 Iraq FA Cup
