= Abi Al-Khaseeb SC =

Iraqi football club

- Full name: Abi Al-Khaseeb Sport Club
- Founded: 1990; 35 years ago
- Ground: Abi Al-Khaseeb Stadium
- Chairman: Ashour Hassan
- League: Iraqi Third Division League
Home colours	Away colours

Abi Al-Khaseeb Sport Club (Arabic: نادي أبي الخصيب الرياضي), is an Iraqi football team based in Abu Al-Khaseeb, Basra, that plays in Iraqi Third Division League.

== History ==
Abi Al-Khaseeb Club was founded in 1990 in Basra.

== See also ==
- 2000–01 Iraqi Elite League
- 2020–21 Iraq FA Cup
