= Shatt Al-Arab SC =

Iraqi football club

- Full name: Shatt Al-Arab Sport Club
- Founded: 1993; 33 years ago
- Ground: Shatt Al-Arab stadium
- Chairman: Thaer Jabor Hashim
- Manager: Jalal Hussein
- League: Iraqi Third Division League
Home colours	Away colours

Shatt Al-Arab Sport Club (Arabic: نادي شط العرب الرياضي), is an Iraqi football team based in Shatt Al-Arab District, Basra, that plays in Iraqi Third Division League.

== Managerial history ==
- (Iraq) Adel Taha Aboud
- (Iraq) Jalal Hussein

== See also ==
- 2021–22 Iraq FA Cup
