= Al-Neel SC =

Iraqi football club

- Full name: Al-Neel Sport Club
- Founded: 2005; 20 years ago
- Ground: Al-Bakrli Stadium
- Chairman: Balasem Rays Al-Mamouri
- Manager: Haider Kadhim
- League: Iraqi Third Division League
Home colours	Away colours

Al-Neel Sport Club (Arabic: نادي النيل الرياضي), is an Iraqi football team based in Babil, that plays in the Iraqi Third Division League.

== Stadium ==
On August 16, 2020, the Ministry of Youth and Sports approved the project to build the Al-Neel Stadium, which will start working during the coming period.

== Managerial history ==
- (Iraq) Saadi Abdul-Hussein
- (Iraq) Haider Kadhim

== See also ==
- 2020–21 Iraq FA Cup
