= Tarmi SC =

Iraqi football club

- Full name: Tarmi Football Club
- Founded: 2019; 6 years ago
- Ground: Al-Dawasa Stadium
- Chairman: Mohammed Ahmed Younis
- Manager: Mustafa Haded
- League: Iraqi Third Division League
Home colours	Away colours

Tarmi Sport Club (Arabic: نادي ترمي الرياضي), is an Iraqi football team based in Tel Afar District, Nineveh, that plays in Iraqi Third Division League.

== Managerial history ==
- (Iraq) Mustafa Haded

== See also ==
- 2020–21 Iraq FA Cup
- 2021–22 Iraq FA Cup
