= Al-Yaqdha SC =

Iraqi football club

- Full name: Al-Yaqdha Sport Club
- Founded: 1968; 58 years ago
- Ground: Al-Yaqdha Stadium
- Chairman: Taleb Abid Gassad
- Manager: Hussein Fanteel
- League: Iraqi Third Division League
Home colours	Away colours

Al-Yaqdha Sport Club (Arabic: نادي اليقظة الرياضي) is an Iraqi football team based in Al-Qādisiyyah, that plays in Iraqi Third Division League.

== Managerial history ==
- (Iraq) Mohsin Mohammed
- (Iraq) Qader Kadhim Nasser
- (Iraq) Hussein Fanteel

== See also ==
- 1990–91 Iraq FA Cup
- 1991–92 Iraq FA Cup
- 1992–93 Iraq FA Cup
- 2000–01 Iraqi Elite League
