= Baladiyat Al-Basra SC =

Iraqi football club

- Full name: Baladiyat Al-Basra Sport Club
- Founded: 2013; 12 years ago
- Ground: Baladiyat Al-Basra Stadium
- Chairman: Usamah Sabeeh
- Manager: Mahmoud Yasser
- League: Iraqi Third Division League
Home colours	Away colours

Baladiyat Al-Basra Sport Club (Arabic: نادي بلدية البصرة الرياضي), is an Iraqi football team based in Al-Saie, Basra, that plays in Iraqi Third Division League.

== Managerial history ==
- (Iraq) Mohammed Abbas
- (Iraq) Mahmoud Yasser

== Other games ==
=== Handball ===
The Baladiyat Al-Basra handball team won the 2016–17 Iraq Handball's 1st Division title

== See also ==
- 2019–20 Iraq FA Cup
- 2020–21 Iraq FA Cup
