= Al-Mithaq SC =

Iraqi football club

- Full name: Al-Mithaq Sport Club
- Founded: 1972; 53 years ago
- Ground: Al-Mithaq Stadium
- Chairman: Firas Kadhim Saham
- Manager: Haider Abdul-Hassan
- League: Iraqi Third Division League
| Home colours | Away colours |

Al-Mithaq Sport Club (Arabic: نادي الميثاق الرياضي), is an Iraqi football team based in Baghdad, that plays in the Iraqi Third Division League.

== History ==
Al-Mithaq Club was founded in 1972 in Sadr City, Baghdad, which is the oldest club in terms of establishment in Sadr City.

== Managerial history ==
- (Iraq) Basil Mohammed
- (Iraq) Haider Abdul-Hassan
