= Al-Mansouriya SC =

Iraqi football club

- Full name: Al-Mansouriya Sport Club
- Founded: 2019; 7 years ago
- Ground: Al-Mansouriya Stadium
- Chairman: Nasrat Ahmed Alwan
- Manager: Mohammed Zaidan
- League: Iraqi Third Division League
Home colours	Away colours

Al-Mansouriya Sport Club (Arabic: نادي المنصورية الرياضي), is an Iraqi football team based in Diyala, that plays in Iraqi Third Division League.

== Managerial history ==
- (Iraq) Mohammed Zaidan

== See also ==
- 2020–21 Iraq FA Cup
- 2021–22 Iraq FA Cup
