= Al-Jihad SC (Iraq) =

Iraqi football club

- Full name: Al-Jihad Sport Club
- Founded: 2003; 23 years ago
- Ground: Al-Jihad Stadium
- Capacity: 1,000
- Chairman: Ali Saadoun
- Manager: Wissam Mohsin
- League: Iraqi Third Division League
Home colours	Away colours

Al-Jihad Sport Club (Arabic: نادي الجهاد الرياضي), is an Iraqi football team based in Wasit, that plays in the Iraqi Third Division League.

== Managerial history ==
- (Iraq) Wissam Mohsin

== See also ==
- 2021–22 Iraqi Second Division League
