= Al-Riyadh SC (Iraq) =

Iraqi football club

- Full name: Al-Riyadh Sport Club
- Founded: 2019; 6 years ago
- Ground: Khaled Al-Dairy Stadium
- Chairman: Marwan Ahmed Omar
- Manager: Qahtan Yassin
- League: Iraqi Third Division League
| Home colours | Away colours |

Al-Riyadh Sport Club (Arabic: نادي الرياض الرياضي), is an Iraqi football team based in Hawija District, Kirkuk, that plays in the Iraqi Third Division League.

== Managerial history ==
- (Iraq) Qahtan Yassin

== See also ==
- 2020–21 Iraq FA Cup
- 2021–22 Iraq FA Cup
