= Baquba SC =

Iraqi football club

- Full name: Baquba Sport Club
- Founded: 2004; 21 years ago
- Ground: Baquba Stadium
- Capacity: 10,000
- Chairman: Qasim Khudhair
- Manager: Uday Nazhan
- League: Iraqi Third Division League
Home colours	Away colours

Baquba Sport Club (Arabic: نادي بعقوبة الرياضي), is an Iraqi football team based in Baquba, Diyala, that plays in Iraqi Third Division League.

== Managerial history ==
- (Iraq) Uday Nazhan

== See also ==
- 2019–20 Iraq FA Cup
