= Al-Dhuluiya SC =

Iraqi football club

- Full name: Al-Dhuluiya Sport Club
- Founded: 1991; 35 years ago
- Ground: Al-Dhuluiya Stadium
- Chairman: Basman Khudhair Hussein
- Manager: Haitham Rashad
- League: Iraqi Third Division League
| Home colours | Away colours |

Al-Dhuluiya Sport Club (Arabic: نادي الضلوعية الرياضي) is an Iraqi football team based in Dhuluiya, Saladin, that plays in Iraqi Third Division League.

== Stadium ==
In March 2017, the Ministry of Youth and Sports decided to reconstruct Al-Dhuluiya Stadium, as it was badly damaged by ISIS terrorist acts.

== Managerial history ==
- (Iraq) Emad Nayef
- (Iraq) Haitham Rashad
