= Al-Ain SC (Iraq) =

Iraqi football club

- Full name: Al-Ain Sport Club
- Founded: 2004; 21 years ago
- Ground: Al-Ain Stadium
- Chairman: Abbas Jassim Mijbel
- Manager: Ali Ghafil
- League: Iraqi Third Division League
Home colours	Away colours

Al-Ain Sport Club (Arabic: نادي العين الرياضي), is an Iraqi football team based in Baghdad, that plays in the Iraqi Third Division League.

== Managerial history ==
- (Iraq) Raad Jabbar
- (Iraq) Ali Ghafil

== See also ==
- 2021–22 Iraqi Third Division League
