= Qalat Sukar SC =

Iraqi football club

- Full name: Qalat Sukar Sport Club
- Founded: 1969; 56 years ago
- Ground: Qalat Sukar Stadium
- Chairman: Kadhim Juru
- Manager: Rasheed Sayer
- League: Iraqi Third Division League
Home colours	Away colours

Qalat Sukar Sport Club (Arabic: نادي قلعة سكر الرياضي), is an Iraqi football team based in Qalat Sukkar, Dhi Qar, that plays in Iraqi Third Division League.

== Managerial history ==
- (Iraq) Rasheed Sayer

== See also ==
- 2021–22 Iraq FA Cup
