= Altun Kupri SC =

Iraqi football club

- Full name: Altun Kupri Sport Club
- Founded: 2002; 23 years ago
- Ground: Altun Kupri Stadium
- Chairman: Honer Jawhar Mohammed
- Manager: Tariq Tumah
- League: Iraqi Third Division League
Home colours	Away colours

Altun Kupri Sport Club (Arabic: نادي آلتون كوبري الرياضي), is an Iraqi football team based in Altun Kupri, Kirkuk, that plays in Iraqi Third Division League.

== Managerial history ==
- (Iraq) Ezzedine Askar
- (Iraq) Mahmoud Majeed
- (Iraq) Tariq Tumah

== See also ==
- 2020–21 Iraq FA Cup
