= Ararat SC =

Iraqi football club

- Full name: Ararat Sport Club
- Founded: 1996; 29 years ago
- Ground: Ararat Stadium
- Chairman: Waleed Anwar
- Manager: Safeen Hamad Amin
- League: Iraqi Third Division League
Home colours	Away colours

Ararat Sport Club (Arabic: نادي أرارات الرياضي) is an Iraqi football team based in Erbil, that plays in Iraqi Third Division League.

== History ==
=== in Premier League ===
Ararat team played in the Iraqi Premier League for the first time in the 2005–06 season, and the team was not good enough, and finished the season second from bottom in their group, and eventually relegated to the Iraqi First Division League.

== Managerial history ==
- (Iraq) Farhan Jabbar (1999–2003)
- (Iraq) Hakeem Shaker (2006–2007)
- (Iraq) Mudhafar Jabbar (2014–2015)
- (Iraq) Saad Nasser (2015–2016)
- (Iraq) Safeen Hamad Amin

== Honours ==
- Kurdistan Regional Cup
  - Winners (1): 2006
