= Al-Sharqiya SC =

Iraqi football club

- Full name: Al-Sharqiya Sport Club
- Founded: 2003; 22 years ago
- Ground: Al-Sharqiya Stadium
- Chairman: Essam Ali Gatouf
- Manager: Majed Kadhim Al-Badri
- League: Iraqi Third Division League
Home colours	Away colours

Al-Sharqiya Sport Club (Arabic: نادي الشرقية الرياضي), is an Iraqi football team based in Wasit, that plays in Iraqi Third Division League.

== Managerial history ==
- (Iraq) Majed Kadhim Al-Badri

== See also ==
- 2020–21 Iraq FA Cup
