= Al-Mashroua SC =

Iraqi football club

- Full name: Al-Mashroua Sport Club
- Founded: 1991; 35 years ago as Saddamiyat Al-Mashroua
- Ground: Al-Mashroua Stadium
- Chairman: Ammar Karim Al-Mashaykhi
- Manager: Mohammed Hussein Arar
- League: Iraqi Third Division League
Home colours	Away colours

Al-Mashroua Sport Club (Arabic: نادي المشروع الرياضي), is an Iraqi football team based in Babil, that plays in Iraqi Third Division League.

== History ==
=== The naming ===
Al-Mashroua Club was established in 1991 under the name of Saddamiyat Al-Mashroua, where it took its name from the name of the city whose name was changed from Al-Mashroua to the Saddamiyat Al-Mashroua (in relation to Saddam, the head of government at that period), and after the change of the ruling regime and the invasion of Iraq in 2003, The city's previous name was returned and Saddam's name was deleted from it, and accordingly the name of the club was changed.

== Managerial history ==
- (Iraq) Fouad Jawad
- (Iraq) Hassan Hadi
- (Iraq) Mohammed Hussein Arar

== See also ==
- 2018–19 Iraq FA Cup
- 2020–21 Iraq FA Cup
