= Umm Qasr SC =

Iraqi football club

- Full name: Umm Qasr Sport Club
- Founded: 1992; 33 years ago
- Ground: Umm Qasr Stadium
- Chairman: Aqeel Jassim
- Manager: Safaa Aassi
- League: Iraqi Third Division League
Home colours	Away colours

Umm Qasr Sport Club (Arabic: نادي أم قصر الرياضي) is an Iraqi football team based in Umm Qasr, Basra, that plays in Iraqi Third Division League.

== Managerial history ==
- (Iraq) Safaa Aassi

== See also ==
- 2000–01 Iraqi Elite League
- 2021–22 Iraqi Second Division League
