= Al-Saniya SC =

Iraqi football club

- Full name: Al-Saniya Sport Club
- Founded: 2000; 25 years ago
- Ground: Al-Saniya Stadium
- Chairman: Salman Kadhim Al-Saqri
- Manager: Mustafa Jaber
- League: Iraqi Third Division League
Home colours	Away colours

Al-Saniya Sport Club (Arabic: نادي السنية الرياضي) is an Iraqi football team based in Al-Saniya, Al-Qādisiyyah, that plays in Iraqi Third Division League.

== Managerial history ==
- (Iraq) Karim Al-Khazali
- (Iraq) Mustafa Jaber

== See also ==
- 2021–22 Iraqi Third Division League
