= Sahl Nineveh SC =

- Full name: Sahl Nineveh Sport Club
- Founded: 2017; 9 years ago
- Ground: Sahl Nineveh Stadium
- Capacity: 5,000
- League: Iraqi Third Division League

Sahl Nineveh Sport Club (Arabic: نادي سهل نينوى الرياضي), is an Iraqi football team based in Nineveh, that plays in the Iraqi Third Division League.

== See also ==
- 2020–21 Iraq FA Cup
- Iraqi First Division League
