= Junoob Baghdad SC =

Iraqi football club

- Full name: Junoob Baghdad Sport Club
- Founded: 2019; 6 years ago
- Ground: Junoob Baghdad Stadium
- Chairman: Falah Khudhair Al-Shammari
- Manager: Basil Fadhel
- League: Iraqi Third Division League
Home colours	Away colours

Junoob Baghdad Sport Club (Arabic: نادي جنوب بغداد الرياضي), is an Iraqi football team based in Al-Latifiya, Baghdad, that plays in the Iraqi Third Division League.

== Managerial history ==
- (Iraq) Basil Fadhel

== See also ==
- 2019–20 Iraq FA Cup
- 2020–21 Iraq FA Cup
- 2021–22 Iraq FA Cup
