= Al-Bathaa SC =

Iraqi football club

- Full name: Al-Bathaa Sport Club
- Founded: 1992; 33 years ago
- Ground: Al-Bathaa Stadium
- Chairman: Malik Ali Nader
- Manager: Sadeq Abbas Al-Ta'an
- League: Iraqi Third Division League
Home colours	Away colours

Al-Bathaa Sport Club (Arabic: نادي البطحاء الرياضي), is an Iraqi football team based in Dhi Qar, that plays in Iraqi Third Division League.

== Managerial history ==
- (Iraq) Tahseen Ali
- (Iraq) Sadeq Abbas Al-Ta'an
- (Iraq) Ali Hadi

== See also ==
- 2002–03 Iraq FA Cup
