= Dijlah SC =

Iraqi football club

- Full name: Dijlah Sport Club
- Founded: 2004; 21 years ago
- Ground: Dijlah Stadium
- Chairman: Ali Mutair
- Manager: Mohammed Jassim
- League: Iraqi Third Division League
Home colours	Away colours

Dijlah Sport Club (Arabic: نادي دجلة الرياضي), is an Iraqi football team based in Maysan, that plays in the Iraqi Third Division League.

== Managerial history ==
- (Iraq) Mohammed Jassim

== See also ==
- 2021–22 Iraqi Second Division League
