= Al-Sumoud SC =

Iraqi football club

- Full name: Al-Sumoud Sport Club
- Ground: Al-Sumoud Stadium
- Chairman: Ismail Mijbel Al-Halbousi
- Manager: Mustafa Mahmoud
- League: Iraqi Third Division League
Home colours	Away colours

Al-Sumoud Sport Club (Arabic: نادي الصمود الرياضي), is an Iraqi football team based in Falluja, Al-Anbar, that plays in Iraqi Third Division League.

== Managerial history ==
- (Iraq) Saadi Awwad
- (Iraq) Mohammed Khalil
- (Iraq) Mustafa Mahmoud

== See also ==
- 2002–03 Iraq FA Cup
- 2020–21 Iraq FA Cup
