= Al-Shabab Al-Basri SC =

Iraqi football club

- Full name: Al-Shabab Al-Basri Sport Club
- Founded: 2017; 8 years ago
- Ground: Al-Shabab Al-Basri stadium
- Chairman: Badr Al-Ziyadi
- Manager: Alwan Musa
- League: Iraqi Third Division League
Home colours	Away colours

Al-Shabab Al-Basri Sport Club (Arabic: نادي الشباب البصري الرياضي), is an Iraqi football team based in Al-Hussein district, Basra, that plays in Iraqi Third Division League.

== Managerial history ==
- (Iraq) Alwan Musa

== Honours ==
=== National ===
- Iraqi First Division League
  - Winners (1): 2018–19

== See also ==
- 2020–21 Iraq FA Cup
