= Al-Fayhaa SC (Iraq) =

Iraqi football club

- Full name: Al-Fayhaa Sport Club
- Founded: 2016; 10 years ago
- Ground: Al-Fayhaa Stadium
- Chairman: Ali Madloul
- Manager: Fahad Jamil
- League: Iraqi Third Division League
| Home colours | Away colours |

Al-Fayhaa Sport Club (Arabic: نادي الفيحاء الرياضي) is an Iraqi football team based in Basra, that plays in Iraqi Third Division League.

== Managerial history ==
- (Iraq) Fahad Jamil

== See also ==
- 2021–22 Iraqi Second Division League
