= Bilad Al-Rafidain SC =

Iraqi football club

- Full name: Bilad Al-Rafidain Sport Club
- Founded: 2019; 7 years ago
- Ground: Bilad Al-Rafidain Stadium
- Chairman: Abdul-Sattar Jassim
- Manager: Abbas Ahmed
- League: Iraqi Third Division League
| Home colours | Away colours |

Bilad Al-Rafidain Sport Club (Arabic: نادي بلاد الرافدين الرياضي) is an Iraqi football team based in Baqubah, Diyala, that plays in Iraqi Third Division League.

== Managerial history ==
- (Iraq) Abbas Ahmed

== See also ==
- 2020–21 Iraq FA Cup
- 2021–22 Iraq FA Cup
