= Al-Baiyaa SC =

Iraqi football club

- Full name: Al-Baiyaa Sport Club
- Founded: 2004; 22 years ago
- Ground: Al-Baiyaa Stadium
- Chairman: Saad Obaid Al-Mahayawi
- Manager: Najem Abid Jassim
- League: Iraqi Third Division League
Home colours	Away colours

Al-Baiyaa Sport Club (Arabic: نادي البياع الرياضي), is an Iraqi football team based in Baghdad, that plays in the Iraqi Third Division League.

== Managerial history ==
- (Iraq) Ammar Ridha
- (Iraq) Anad Abid
- (Iraq) Ali Abdul-Wahab Al-Nakar
- (Iraq) Abdul-Wahab Abdul-Razzaq
- (Iraq) Najem Abid Jassim

== See also ==
- 2020–21 Iraq FA Cup
- 2021–22 Iraq FA Cup
