= Kaywan SC =

Iraqi football club

- Full name: Kaywan Sport Club
- Founded: 1994; 31 years ago
- Ground: Kaywan Stadium
- Manager: Ezzedine Askar
- League: Iraqi Third Division League
Home colours	Away colours

Kaywan Sport Club (Arabic: نادي كيوان الرياضي), is an Iraqi football team based in Kirkuk, that plays in Iraqi Third Division League.

== History ==
Kaywan is one of the active clubs in Kirkuk. It was founded in 1994 by a group of deported Kirkuk athletes in Erbil. After the invasion of Iraq, these athletes returned to their city and transferred the club's activities to it.

== Managerial history ==
- (Iraq) Ezzedine Askar
