= Hibhib SC =

Iraqi football club

- Full name: Hibhib Sport Club
- Founded: 1998; 28 years ago
- Ground: Hibhib Stadium
- Chairman: Saud Aziz
- Manager: Hussein Abid-Ali Al-Saadi
- League: Iraqi Third Division League
Home colours	Away colours

Hibhib Sport Club (Arabic: نادي هبهب الرياضي), is an Iraqi football team based in Diyala, that plays in Iraqi Third Division League.

== Managerial history ==
- (Iraq) Akram Ghadhban
- (Iraq) Hussein Abid-Ali Al-Saadi

== See also ==
- 2002–03 Iraq FA Cup
- 2019–20 Iraq FA Cup
