= Al-Daghara SC =

Iraqi football club

- Full name: Al-Daghara Sport Club
- Founded: 1989; 36 years ago
- Ground: Al-Daghara Stadium
- Chairman: Mohammed Ali Salman
- Manager: Sabah Ali Draiwish
- League: Iraqi Third Division League
Home colours	Away colours

Al-Daghara Sport Club (Arabic: نادي الدغارة الرياضي) is an Iraqi football team based in Al-Daghara, Al-Qādisiyyah, that plays in Iraqi Third Division League.

== Managerial history ==
- (Iraq) Emad Al-Saeedi
- (Iraq) Sabah Ali Draiwish

== See also ==
- 2000–01 Iraqi Elite League
- 2001–02 Iraq FA Cup
