= Al-Najma SC (Iraq) =

Iraqi football club

- Full name: Al-Najma Football Club
- Founded: 2003; 22 years ago
- Ground: Al-Najma Stadium
- Chairman: Hakem Nima Awwad
- Manager: Mohammed Abed Hani
- League: Iraqi Third Division League
Home colours	Away colours

Al-Najma Sport Club (Arabic: نادي النجمة الرياضي) is an Iraqi football team based in Al-Qādisiyyah. It plays in Iraqi Third Division League.

== Managerial history ==
- (Iraq) Faleh Abed Hajim
- (Iraq) Ghanem Fadhel
- (Iraq) Mohammed Abed Hani

== See also ==
- 2018–19 Iraq FA Cup
- 2019–20 Iraq FA Cup
- 2020–21 Iraq FA Cup
