= Al-Khaleej Al-Arabi SC =

Iraqi football club

- Full name: Al-Khaleej Al-Arabi Sport Club
- Nicknames: Al-Mawj Al-Akhdhar (The Green Wave)
- Founded: 1992; 33 years ago
- Ground: Al-Khaleej Al-Arabi Stadium
- Manager: Chasib Al-Bazzouni
- League: Iraqi Third Division League
Home colours	Away colours

Al-Khaleej Al-Arabi Sport Club (Arabic: نادي الخليج العربي الرياضي) is an Iraqi football team based in Basra, that plays in Iraqi Third Division League.

== Managerial history ==
- (Iraq) Chasib Al-Bazzouni

== See also ==
- 2021–22 Iraqi Second Division League
