= Wasit SC =

Iraqi football club

- Full name: Wasit Sport Club
- Founded: 1997; 28 years ago
- Ground: Wasit Stadium
- Chairman: Ibrahim Thijeel Al-Tamimi
- Manager: Salih Joban
- League: Iraqi Third Division League
Home colours	Away colours

Wasit Sport Club (Arabic: نادي واسط الرياضي), is an Iraqi football team based in Wasit, that plays in Iraqi Third Division League.

== Managerial history ==
- (Iraq) Safaa Jawad
- (Iraq) Salih Joban

== See also ==
- 1998–99 Iraq FA Cup
- 2000–01 Iraqi Elite League
- 2002–03 Iraq FA Cup
