= Al-Miqdadiya SC =

Iraqi football club

- Full name: Al-Miqdadiya Sport Club
- Founded: 1972; 54 years ago
- Ground: Al-Miqdadiya Stadium
- Chairman: Ali Abid Kadhim
- Manager: Salam Al-Magsousi
- League: Iraqi Third Division League
Home colours	Away colours

Al-Miqdadiya Sport Club (Arabic: نادي المقدادية الرياضي), is an Iraqi football team based in Al-Miqdadiya District, Diyala, that plays in Iraqi Third Division League.

== History ==
=== War on terror ===
In July 2017, the president of Al-Muqdadiya Club Sarmad Hadi announced that all the players, employees and members of the club’s administrative body volunteered on the battle fronts in the ranks of the Popular Mobilization Forces with the Iraqi Armed Forces to confront ISIS, which occupied areas in Iraq, after the players received special training on weapons.

== Managerial history ==
- (Iraq) Salam Al-Magsousi

== See also ==
- 1998–99 Iraq FA Cup
- 2000–01 Iraqi Elite League
