= Kahrabaa Al-Hartha SC =

Iraqi football club

- Full name: Kahrabaa Al-Hartha Sport Club
- Founded: 1994; 31 years ago
- Ground: Kahrabaa Al-Hartha stadium
- Owner: Ministry of Electricity
- Chairman: Asaad Abdul Hassan
- Manager: Alaa Dar'am
- League: Iraqi Third Division League
Home colours	Away colours

Kahrabaa Al-Hartha Sport Club (Arabic: نادي كهرباء الهارثة الرياضي), is an Iraqi football team based in Al-Hartha, Basra, that plays in Iraqi Third Division League.

== Managerial history ==
- (Iraq) Alaa Dar'am

== Famous players ==
- (Iraq) Ehsan Hadi
- (Iraq) Ammar Abdul-Hussein

== See also ==
- 2000–01 Iraqi Elite League
- 2002–03 Iraq FA Cup
- 2021–22 Iraq FA Cup
