= Ghaz Al-Junoob SC =

Iraqi football club

Ghaz Al-Junoob
- Full name: Ghaz Al-Junoob Sport Club
- Founded: 2001; 24 years ago
- Ground: Ghaz Al-Junoob Stadium
- Chairman: Hazim Mohammed Jassim
- Manager: Alaa Akbar
- League: Iraqi Third Division League
| Home colours | Away colours |

Ghaz Al-Junoob (Arabic: نادي غاز الجنوب), transliterated: (South Gas Club) is an Iraqi multi-sport club based in Basra, that plays in Iraqi Third Division League.

== Other games ==
=== Volleyball ===
The Ghaz Al-Junoob volleyball team won the Iraqi volleyball League title at 2011–12, 2012–13, 2013–14, 2014–15 and 2017–18 seasons, and won the 2014 Al-Muthabara Cup. The team also participated in the AVC Club Volleyball Championship and Arab Clubs Championship as a representative of Iraq.

=== Futsal ===
The Ghaz Al-Junoob futsal team won the 2013–14 Iraq Futsal's 1st Division title
