= Al-Maimouna District =

Coordinates: 31.4°N 46.73333°E

Al-Maimouna District Arabic: قضاء الميمونة
- District
- Interactive map of Al-Maimouna District
- Country: Iraq
- Governorate: Maysan Governorate
- Time zone: UTC+3 (AST)

Al-Maimouna District (Arabic: قضاء الميمونة) is a district of the Maysan Governorate, Iraq.
