= Khak SC =

Iraqi football club

- Full name: Khak Sport Club
- Founded: 1992; 33 years ago
- Ground: Khak Stadium
- Chairman: Samin Yassin Ahmed
- Manager: Mudhaffer Nouri
- League: Iraqi Third Division League
Home colours	Away colours

Khak Sport Club (Kurdish: یانەی وەرزشیی خاک, romanized: Yaney Werzişîy Xak, Arabic: نادي خاك الرياضي) is an Iraqi football team based in Kirkuk, that plays in the Iraqi Third Division League and Kurdistan Premier League.

== Managerial history ==
- (Iraq) Mudhaffer Nouri

== See also ==
- 2020–21 Iraq FA Cup
- 2021–22 Iraq FA Cup
