= Jalawla SC =

Iraqi football club

- Full name: Jalawla Sport Club
- Founded: 1991; 34 years ago
- Ground: Jalawla Stadium
- Chairman: Yaqoub Yousef
- Manager: Sattar Ahmed Hawwas
- League: Iraqi Third Division League
Home colours	Away colours

Jalawla Sport Club (Arabic: نادي جلولاء الرياضي) is an Iraqi football team based in Jalawla, Diyala, that plays in Iraqi Third Division League.

== Managerial history ==
- (Iraq) Najem Abid Awwad
- (Iraq) Anad Abid
- (Iraq) Nadhim Hussein Shihab
- (Iraq) Jassim Mohammed
- (Iraq) Mazin Salih
- (Iraq) Ahmed Hameed
- (Iraq) Sardar Mohammed
- (Iraq) Sattar Ahmed Hawwas

== See also ==
- 1998–99 Iraq FA Cup
- 2002–03 Iraq FA Cup
- 2019–20 Iraq FA Cup
- 2020–21 Iraq FA Cup
