= Al-Ettifaq SC (Iraq) =

Iraqi football club

- Full name: Al-Ettifaq Sport Club
- Founded: 2004; 21 years ago
- Ground: Al-Ettifaq Stadium
- Chairman: Hussein Jabur
- Manager: Abdul Zahra Odeh
- League: Iraqi Third Division League
Home colours	Away colours

Al-Ettifaq Sport Club (Arabic: نادي الاتفاق الرياضي) is an Iraqi football team based in Al Diwaniyah.

== Managerial history ==
- (Iraq) Ahmed Nima
- (Iraq) Abdul-Zahra Odeh

== See also ==
- 2021–22 Iraqi Second Division League
