= Al-Nahrain SC =

Iraqi football club

- Full name: Al-Nahrain Sport Club
- Founded: 2003; 22 years ago
- Ground: Al-Nahrain Stadium
- Chairman: Sabah Al-Tamimi
- Manager: Wissam Mohsin
- League: Iraqi Third Division League
Home colours	Away colours

Al-Nahrain Sport Club (Arabic: نادي النهرين الرياضي), is an Iraqi football team based in Wasit, that plays in Iraqi Third Division League.

== Managerial history ==
- (Iraq) Ibrahim Shaker
- (Iraq) Mohammed Hamza
- (Iraq) Wissam Mohsin

== See also ==
- 2021–22 Iraqi Third Division League
