= Al-Ishaqi SC =

Iraqi football club

- Full name: Al-Ishaqi Sport Club
- Founded: 1995; 30 years ago
- Ground: Al-Ishaqi Stadium
- Chairman: Jassim Abbas Al-Majmaee
- Manager: Ayad Abbas Al-Baldawi
- League: Iraqi Third Division League
Home colours	Away colours

Al-Ishaqi Sport Club (Arabic: نادي الإسحاقي الرياضي) is an Iraqi football team based in Saladin, that plays in Iraqi Third Division League.

== Managerial history ==
- (Iraq) Haitham Rashad
- (Iraq) Ayad Abbas Al-Baldawi

== Famous players ==
- (Iraq) Hammadi Ahmed

== See also ==
- 2021–22 Iraqi Third Division League
