= Umal Nineveh SC =

Iraqi football club

- Full name: Umal Nineveh Sport Club
- Founded: 2004; 22 years ago
- Ground: Al-Dawasa Stadium
- Chairman: Marwan Al-Qassab
- Manager: Saad Al-Dahamshi
- League: Iraqi Third Division League
Home colours	Away colours

Umal Nineveh Sport Club (Arabic: نادي عمال نينوى الرياضي), is an Iraqi football team based in Nineveh, that plays in Iraqi Third Division League.

== Managerial history ==
- (Iraq) Ziyad Mahmoud
- (Iraq) Saad Al-Dahamshi

== See also ==
- 2020–21 Iraq FA Cup
- 2021–22 Iraq FA Cup
