= Al-Hay SC =

Iraqi football club

- Full name: Al-Hay Sport Club
- Founded: 1972; 53 years ago
- Ground: Al-Hay Stadium
- Chairman: Mohammed Kamil
- Manager: Majed Kadhim
- League: Iraqi Third Division League
Home colours	Away colours

Al-Hay Sport Club (Arabic: نادي الحي الرياضي), is an Iraqi football team based in Al-Hay, Wasit.

== Managerial history ==
- (Iraq) Alaa Naji
- (Iraq) Sajjad Banwan
- (Iraq) Majed Kadhim

== See also ==
- 2021–22 Iraq FA Cup
