= Al-Falluja SC =

Iraqi football club

- Full name: Al-Falluja Sport Club
- Founded: 1968; 58 years ago
- Ground: Al-Fallujah Stadium
- Capacity: 7,000
- Chairman: Sattar Dhabea Ali
- Manager: Abdullah Jassim
- League: Iraqi First Division League
Home colours	Away colours

Al-Falluja Sport Club (Arabic: نادي الفلوجة الرياضي), is an Iraqi football team based in Fallujah, Al-Anbar, that plays in Iraqi First Division League.

== Stadium ==
The Al-Fallujah Stadium was rehabilitated in 2013 by the Ministry of Youth and Sports, and after this year, ISIS took control of the Al-Fallujah Stadium when it occupied the Al Anbar Governorate. In June 2016, the Iraqi Armed Forces managed to liberate the Fallujah areas, including the stadium. The stadium was reconstructed starting in 2017, Then was vandalized as a result of the families displaced from Syria housing in it, and in 2021 the stadium was rehabilitated again, and the team returned to play on its ground.

== Managerial history ==
- (Iraq) Mohammed Marzouq
- (Iraq) Saadi Awad Al-Kubaisi
- (Iraq) Ahmed Fadhel
- (Iraq) Abdullah Jassim

== See also ==
- 1977–78 Iraq FA Cup
- 1989–90 Iraq FA Cup
- 1991–92 Iraq FA Cup
- 1992–93 Iraq FA Cup
- 2001–02 Iraq FA Cup
- 2002–03 Iraq FA Cup
- 2021–22 Iraq FA Cup
