= Al-Adala SC =

Iraqi football club

Al-Adala Justice (English)
- Full name: Al-Adala Sports Club
- Founded: 1999; 27 years ago
- Ground: Al-Adala Stadium
- Chairman: Adnan Jabbar
- Manager: Adel Acher
- League: Iraqi Third Division League
Home colours	Away colours

Al-Adala Sports Club (Justice SC, Arabic: نادي العدالة الرياضي) is an Iraqi football club based in Al-Sha'ab, Baghdad. They currently play in the Iraqi Third Division League.

== Current technical staff ==
Position	Name	Nationality
Manager:	Adel Acher	(Iraq)
Assistant manager:	Haider Mohi	(Iraq)
Assistant manager:	Malik Shalish	(Iraq)
Goalkeeper coach:	Wisam Abdul Aziz	(Iraq)

Updated to match played 26 Sept 2019

== Managers Stats ==
As of 9 October 2020

Name	From	To	Record				
Name	From	To	G	W	D	L	Win %
(Iraq) Adel Acher	26 September 2020	""Present""	5	2	1	2	40.00
