= Tuz SC =

Iraqi football club

- Full name: Tuz Sports Club
- Founded: 1992
- Ground: Tuz Khurmatu, Saladin Governorate
- League: Iraqi Second Division League

Tuz SC (Arabic: نادي طوز الرياضي) is an Iraqi football team based in Tuz Khurmatu, Saladin Governorate. Tuz has the largest Turkmen community in Saladin Province. Tuz is a word of Turkish origin which means "salt".

== 2012–13 ==
Currently Tuz is runner-up in the 2012–13 Iraqi First Division League Group A and in their way to qualify to the Iraq Premier League.
