= Iraqi Third Division League =

- Founded: 2024; 2 years ago
- Country: Iraq
- Level on pyramid: 5
- Promotion to: Iraqi Second Division League
- Current champions: Akre (1st title)
- Most championships: Al-Sinaat Al-Harbiya; Akre (1 title each)

The Iraqi Third Division League is a football league that is the fifth tier of the Iraqi football league system. The league was established in 2024.

In the first stage, teams are split into 19 regional tournaments in accordance with the 19 governorates of Iraq. Each tournament is organised by the Iraq Football Association's sub-branch in that governorate (except for the tournament in Baghdad which is organised by the IFA Competitions Committee). The winner and runner-up in Baghdad both qualify for the final stage, alongside the winner from each of the other provinces.

In the second stage, the 20 qualified teams are divided into two groups of ten teams each. Each team plays the other teams in their group once in a single round-robin format. The two group winners are promoted to the Iraqi Second Division League and advance to the final, which is a single match at a neutral venue to determine the league champion. The two group runners-up compete in a two-legged third place play-off, with the winner also being promoted to the Iraqi Second Division League.

In the 2025–26 season, Akre won the championship title after defeating Al-Hindiya 3–0 in the final match.

== Results ==
| Season | Final | | |
| Season | Champions | Score | Runners-up |
|---|---|---|---|
| 2024–25 | Al-Sinaat Al-Harbiya | 2–1 | New Sirwan |
| 2025–26 | Akre | 3–0 | Al-Hindiya |

== See also ==
- Iraq Stars League
- Iraq FA Cup
- Iraqi Super Cup
