= 2022–23 Iraqi First Division League =

Iraqi First Division League
- Season: 2022–23
- Dates: 18 November 2022 – 2 June 2023
- Champions: Al-Minaa (3rd title)
- Promoted: Al-Minaa; Amanat Baghdad
- Relegated: Al-Hawija; Al-Jinsiya; Al-Samawa; Al-Sulaikh
- Matches: 243
- Goals: 518 (2.13 per match)
- Top goalscorer: Mohammed Hassan (13 goals)
- Biggest home win: Al-Minaa 5–0 Al-Sulaikh (27 April 2023)
- Biggest away win: Masafi Al-Junoob 0–3 Amanat Baghdad (23 November 2022); Al-Nasiriya 0–3 Diyala (13 February 2023); Al-Hawija 1–4 Samarra (20 April 2023); Afak 0–3 Al-Minaa (21 April 2023); Al-Hawija 1–4 Maysan (1 May 2023); Masafi Al-Wasat 0–3 Al-Minaa (2 May 2023)
- Highest scoring: Al-Difaa Al-Madani 4–4 Al-Sinaat Al-Kahrabaiya (1 March 2023)
- Longest winning run: 5 matches Al-Minaa; Diyala
- Longest unbeaten run: 11 matches Al-Minaa
- Longest winless run: 8 matches Al-Hawija; Al-Difaa Al-Madani
- Longest losing run: 5 matches Al-Hawija; Al-Sulaikh

The 2022–23 Iraqi First Division League was the 49th season of what is now called the Iraqi Premier Division League, the second tier of the Iraqi football league system, since its establishment in 1974. The number of clubs in the league have varied throughout history for various reasons. The top two teams are promoted to the Iraq Stars League, while the bottom two teams in each group are directly relegated to the Iraqi Second Division League.

In the last round of the league, in the Group 1, Amanat Baghdad was able to topped the group after achieving 38 points, while in the Group 2, Al-Minaa topped the group after achieving 46 points. Both teams were promoted to the Stars League, and it was decided that the final match between the two teams will be held in Baghdad on May 26, 2023 to determine the league champion. The Al-Minaa administration demanded that the match be transferred to Basra due to the large number of fans of the Al-Minaa, so that the match would be more attended, and the Amanat Baghdad administration agreed to that. Later, the Football Association decided that the match would be held on 2 June in Al-Fayhaa Stadium.

In the final, Al-Minaa was able to defeat Amanat Baghdad, 2–1, and win the title. The goals of Al-Minaa were scored by Sajjad Alaa (6') and Salem Ahmed (37'), while the goal of Amanat Baghdad was scored by Karrar Ali Bari (53').

Al-Jinsiya (who withdrew from the start) and Al-Hawija from Group 1, and Al-Sulaikh and Al-Samawa from Group 2 were relegated to the Iraqi Second Division League after finishing in the bottom positions in the standings.

== Team changes ==
The following teams have changed division since the 2021–22 season:

=== To Iraqi First Division League ===
Promoted from Iraqi Second Division League

- Al-Etisalat
- Al-Hawija
- Al-Jolan
- Masafi Al-Wasat

Relegated from the Premier League

- Amanat Baghdad
- Al-Minaa
- Samarra

=== From Iraqi First Division League ===
Promoted to the Premier League

- Al-Hudood
- Duhok
- Karbalaa

Relegated to Iraqi Second Division League

- Al-Alam
- Babil
- Ghaz Al-Shamal
- Suq Al-Shuyukh

== Overview ==
=== Changes ===
In November 2020, The Iraq FA announced that the number of teams will decrease from 28 to 24 in total starting from 2021-2022 season. To make these changes possible, the Iraq FA announced that in 2022–23 season, a two teams are promoted to the Premier League, where the winner and runner-up of each group will play a play-off match, so that the winners will be promoted directly to the Premier League, while 6 teams in total are directly relegated to Second Division League.

On April 8, 2023, the promotion and relegation mechanism was changed, and the Football Association announced the promotion of the winning team in each group directly to the Premier League, and the relegation of the last two teams in the standings in each group to the Second Division League, as a result, two teams are promote and 4 teams are relegate.

=== Developments ===
On December 27, 2022, the Iraq Football Association decided to stop the championship matches, starting from the ninth round, due to the holding of the Arabian Gulf Cup in Iraq, and decided that the championship would resume after the end of the Arabian Gulf Cup. Indeed, the ninth round of the championship resumed on January 18, 2023.

== Teams ==
A total of 24 teams are contesting the league, including 17 sides from the 2021–22 season and the 3 relegated sides from the Iraqi Premier League and the 4 promoted sides from the Iraqi Second Division League, because of the recent changes necessary to adjustment to having 24 teams possible this season. The teams were divided into two groups, and the draw was held on October 27, 2022, and it was decided that the championship will start on November 18, 2022.

=== 2022–23 season ===
Locations of the 2022–23 Iraqi First Division League teams

Team	Manager	Location	Stadium	Capacity
Afak	(Iraq) Hussein Mohie	Al-Qādisiyyah	Al-Kifl Stadium	8,000
Al-Bahri	(Iraq) Ahmed Rahim	Basra (Al-Jubaila)	Al-Bahri Stadium	7,000
Al-Difaa Al-Madani	(Iraq) Adel Ajer	Baghdad (Al-Shaab)	Al-Taji Stadium	5,000
Al-Etisalat	(Iraq) Ahmed Hassan Abdul-Sahib	Baghdad (Al-Mansour)	Al-Taji Stadium	5,000
Al-Hawija	(Iraq) Ali Abboud	Kirkuk	Al-Hawija Stadium	5,000
Al-Hussein	(Iraq) Sahl Naeem	Baghdad (Sadr City)	Five Thousand Stadium	5,000
Al-Jinsiya (withdrew)	vacant	Baghdad (Al-Mashtal)	Al-Jinsiya Stadium	5,000
Al-Jolan	(Iraq) Mustafa Karim	Al-Anbar (Al-Fallujah)	Al-Fallujah Stadium	7,000
Al-Kufa	(Iraq) Maitham Jaber	Najaf	Najaf Stadium	12,000
Al-Minaa	(Iraq) Fareed Majeed	Basra (Al-Maqal)	Al-Minaa Olympic Stadium	30,000
Al-Muroor	(Iraq) Rashid Sultan	Baghdad (Sadr City)	Al-Walaa Stadium	5,000
Al-Nasiriya	(Iraq) Aqeel Mohammed	Dhi Qar	An Nasiriya Stadium	10,000
Al-Ramadi	(Iraq) Jumaa Jadeea	Al-Anbar (Al-Ramadi)	Al Ramadi Stadium	10,000
Al-Samawa	(Iraq) Ali Jawad	Muthanna	Al-Samawah Stadium	5,000
Al-Sinaat Al-Kahrabaiya	(Iraq) Mohammed Ali Karim	Baghdad (Al-Wazireya)	Al-Sinaa Stadium	10,000
Al-Shirqat	(Iraq) Farhan Hamad	Saladin (Al-Shirqat)	Al-Shirqat Stadium	5,000
Al-Sulaikh	(Iraq) Muthana Khalid	Baghdad (Al-Sulaikh)	Al-Sulaikh Stadium	5,000
Amanat Baghdad	(Iraq) Wissam Talib	Baghdad (Al-Nahdha)	Amanat Baghdad Stadium	5,000
Diyala	(Iraq) Sadeq Hanoon	Diyala	Diyala Stadium	10,000
Masafi Al-Junoob	(Iraq) Abdul Yemma Warwar	Basra (Shaibah)	Masafi Al-Junoob Stadium	5,000
Masafi Al-Wasat	(Iraq) Ali Majeed	Baghdad (Al-Dura)	Al-Masafi Stadium	5,000
Maysan	(Iraq) Mizher Rahim	Maysan	Maysan Stadium	25,000
Peshmerga Sulaymaniya	(Iraq) Qusay Hashim	Sulaymaniyah	Peshmerga Stadium	10,000
Samarra	(Iraq) Ali Wahab	Saladin (Samarra)	Samarra Stadium	10,000

=== Managerial changes ===
Team	Outgoing manager	Manner of departure	Date of vacancy	Position in the group	Incoming manager	Date of appointment
Al-Sinaat Al-Kahrabaiya	(Iraq) Safaa Adnan	Sacked	2 November 2022	Pre-season	(Iraq) Mudhafar Jabbar	2 November 2022
Al-Ramadi	(Iraq) Thair Jassam	Sacked	24 November 2022	11th	(Iraq) Mohammed Hammad	24 November 2022
Al-Samawa	(Iraq) Aqeel Ghani	Sacked	26 November 2022	10th	(Iraq) Haider Hussien	26 November 2022
Samarra	(Iraq) Nihad Ghazi	Sacked	2 December 2022	9th	(Iraq) Zahed Qasim	2 December 2022
Al-Nasiriya	(Iraq) Dhiaa Abdul-Nabi	Sacked	6 December 2022	12th	(Iraq) Mubarak Matar	6 December 2022
Masafi Al-Junoob	(Iraq) Nasser Talla Dahilan	Sacked	14 December 2022	11th	(Iraq) Abdul Yemma Warwar	14 December 2022
Al-Samawa	(Iraq) Haider Hussien	Sacked	15 December 2022	12th	(Iraq) Ali Jawad	19 December 2022
Al-Sulaikh	(Iraq) Hazem Saleh	Sacked	19 December 2022	11th	(Iraq) Muthana Khalid	2 January 2023
Al-Jolan	(Iraq) Ali Wahab	Sacked	26 December 2022	5th	(Iraq) Mustafa Karim	4 January 2023
Samarra	(Iraq) Zahed Qasim	Sacked	3 January 2023	11th	(Iraq) Ali Wahab	3 January 2023
Al-Nasiriya	(Iraq) Mubarak Matar	End of interim spell	12 January 2023	12th	(Iraq) Mohsin Abdul-Nabi	12 January 2023
Al-Hawija	(Iraq) Adel Khudhair	Sacked	21 January 2023	10th	(Iraq) Ali Abboud	21 January 2023
Afak	(Iraq) Haider Abbas	Sacked	22 January 2023	10th	(Iraq) Haider Hussein	22 January 2023
Al-Ramadi	(Iraq) Mohammed Hammad	Sacked	1 February 2023	5th	(Iraq) Sadeq Hanoon	1 February 2023
Al-Sinaat Al-Kahrabaiya	(Iraq) Mudhafar Jabbar	Mutual consent	11 February 2023	5th	(Iraq) Mohammed Ali Karim	11 February 2023
Al-Nasiriya	(Iraq) Mohsin Abdul-Nabi	Mutual consent	4 March 2023	11th	(Iraq) Aqeel Mohammed	8 March 2023
Afak	(Iraq) Haider Hussein	Sacked	13 March 2023	8th	(Iraq) Hussein Mohie	13 March 2023
Al-Ramadi	(Iraq) Sadeq Hanoon	Mutual consent	16 March 2023	7th	(Iraq) Jumaa Jadeea	17 March 2023
Al-Jolan	(Iraq) Mustafa Karim	Mutual consent	20 March 2023	1st	(Iraq) Hazem Saleh	20 March 2023
Al-Etisalat	(Iraq) Hamza Dawood	Mutual consent	30 March 2023	10th	(Iraq) Ahmed Hassan Abdul-Sahib	1 April 2023
Al-Jolan	(Iraq) Hazem Saleh	Mutual consent	1 April 2023	2nd	(Iraq) Mustafa Karim	1 April 2023
Diyala	(Iraq) Ali Abdullah	Sacked	1 April 2023	3rd	(Iraq) Sadeq Hanoon	2 April 2023
Al-Minaa	(Iraq) Basim Qasim	Sacked	20 May 2023	1st	(Iraq) Fareed Majeed	20 May 2023

== League table ==
=== Group 1 ===
Pos	Team	Pld	W	D	L	GF	GA	GD	Pts	Qualification or relegation
1	Amanat Baghdad (P)	20	11	5	4	26	9	+17	38	Promotion to the Iraq Stars League
2	Peshmerga Sulaymaniya	20	9	6	5	31	22	+9	33	
3	Al-Ramadi	20	8	6	6	20	19	+1	30 (Note: Al-Ramadi finished ahead of Maysan on head-to-head points: Al-Ramadi 2–0 Maysan, Maysan 1–0 Al-Ramadi.)	
4	Maysan	20	9	3	8	26	23	+3	30	
5	Samarra	20	8	4	8	23	21	+2	28 (Note: Samarra finished ahead of Al-Sinaat Al-Kahrabaiya on head-to-head points: Al-Sinaat Al-Kahrabaiya 0–0 Samarra, Samarra 2–1 Al-Sinaat Al-Kahrabaiya.)	
6	Al-Sinaat Al-Kahrabaiya	20	6	10	4	27	24	+3	28	
7	Al-Bahri	20	7	6	7	22	20	+2	27	
8	Al-Etisalat	20	7	4	9	18	23	−5	25	
9	Masafi Al-Junoob	20	6	6	8	22	32	−10	24	
10	Al-Difaa Al-Madani	20	5	8	7	20	22	−2	23	
11	Al-Hawija (R)	20	3	4	13	20	40	−20	13	Relegation to Iraqi Second Division League
12	Al-Jinsiya (Note: Al-Jinsiya withdrew from the tournament.) (R)	0	0	0	0	0	0	0	0	Relegation to Iraqi Second Division League

Updated to match(es) played on 1 May 2023. Source: IFA official website
Rules for classification: 1) points; 2) head-to-head points; 3) head-to-head goal difference; 4) goal difference; 5) number of wins; 6) number of goals scored.
(P) Promoted; (R) Relegated

==== Results ====
Home \ Away	BAH	DFM	ETI	HAW	JIN	RAM	SNK	AMB	MSJ	MAY	PES	SAM
Al-Bahri	—	1–0	0–1	4–1	—	0–0	1–1	2–1	3–0	1–1	2–3	3–1
Al-Difaa Al-Madani	1–1	—	3–0	2–1	—	2–0	4–4	0–0	1–1	0–1	2–1	1–1
Al-Etisalat	0–1	2–1	—	0–1	—	1–0	2–2	0–1	0–1	1–1	2–1	2–1
Al-Hawija	1–1	2–1	0–1	—	—	2–3	0–0	0–0	3–2	1–4	0–0	1–4
Al-Jinsiya	—	—	—	—	—	—	—	—	—	—	—	—
Al-Ramadi	1–0	2–0	0–0	2–1	—	—	2–1	0–0	2–2	2–0	3–1	2–1
Al-Sinaat Al-Kahrabaiya	1–0	1–1	2–1	2–1	—	0–0	—	2–0	0–1	2–1	2–2	0–0
Amanat Baghdad	2–0	0–0	2–1	3–0	—	1–0	2–1	—	3–0	3–0	0–0	2–0
Masafi Al-Junoob	0–1	0–0	2–1	3–2	—	1–1	2–2	0–3	—	2–2	2–1	2–0
Maysan	4–1	2–0	0–1	2–1	—	1–0	1–2	2–1	2–0	—	1–2	1–0
Peshmerga Sulaymaniya	1–0	2–0	1–1	5–2	—	3–0	1–1	1–0	2–1	2–0	—	1–1
Samarra	0–0	0–1	3–1	1–0	—	2–0	2–1	0–2	3–0 (Note: The Samarra–Masafi Al-Junoob match was awarded as a 3–0 win to Samarra, as Masafi Al-Junoob involved an unregistered player for the team in the game, and the actual match score was a 1-1 draw.)	1–0	2–1	—

Updated to match(es) played on 1 May 2023. Source: IFA official website
Legend: Blue = home team win; Yellow = draw; Red = away team win.

=== Group 2 ===
Pos	Team	Pld	W	D	L	GF	GA	GD	Pts	Qualification or relegation
1	Al-Minaa (C, P)	22	13	7	2	38	15	+23	46	Promotion to the Iraq Stars League
2	Diyala	22	13	6	3	25	11	+14	45	
3	Al-Jolan	22	9	8	5	29	19	+10	35	
4	Masafi Al-Wasat	22	9	7	6	17	15	+2	34	
5	Al-Muroor	22	7	11	4	22	18	+4	32	
6	Al-Kufa	22	6	10	6	22	19	+3	28	
7	Afak	22	6	5	11	21	27	−6	23 (Note: Afak finished ahead of Al-Hussein, and Al-Hussein finished ahead of Al-Shirqat, on head-to-head points: Afak 7, Al-Hussein 5, Al-Shirqat 4.)	
8	Al-Hussein	22	5	8	9	16	20	−4	23	
9	Al-Shirqat	22	5	8	9	21	29	−8	23	
10	Al-Nasiriya	22	5	7	10	17	31	−14	22	
11	Al-Sulaikh (R)	22	4	8	10	19	31	−12	20	Relegation to Iraqi Second Division League
12	Al-Samawa (R)	22	3	9	10	16	28	−12	18	Relegation to Iraqi Second Division League

Updated to match(es) played on 2 May 2023. Source: IFA official website
Rules for classification: 1) points; 2) head-to-head points; 3) head-to-head goal difference; 4) goal difference; 5) number of wins; 6) number of goals scored.
(C) Champions; (P) Promoted; (R) Relegated

==== Results ====
Home \ Away	AFK	HUS	JOL	KUF	MIN	MUR	NAS	SMA	SRQ	SUL	DIY	MWT
Afak	—	0–0	2–1	1–0	0–3	1–2	3–0 (Note: The Afak–Al-Nasiriya match was awarded as a 3–0 win to Afak, as Al-Nasiriya fans rioted.)	0–0	4–1	1–2	0–0	0–1
Al-Hussein	0–1	—	0–1	1–0	0–0	1–1	1–0	2–1	3–0 (Note: The Al-Hussein–Al-Shirqat match was awarded as a 3–0 win to Al-Hussein, as Al-Shirqat involved an unregistered player for the team in the game, and the actual result of the match was a 1–2 victory for Al-Shirqat.)	2–0	0–0	1–2
Al-Jolan	2–0	2–2	—	1–1	0–0	3–0 (Note: The Al-Jolan–Al-Muroor match was awarded as a 3–0 win to Al-Jolan, as Al-Muroor withdraw from the game.)	3–0	0–0	2–1	3–0	2–3	1–1
Al-Kufa	1–0	1–1	1–2	—	1–1	2–0	0–0	2–0	3–1	2–2	1–1	1–0
Al-Minaa	1–1	1–0	1–0	0–0	—	3–2	3–0	2–1	5–2	5–0	1–2	1–0
Al-Muroor	1–1	2–0	1–1	0–0	1–1	—	1–1	1–1	2–0	1–0	2–0	0–0
Al-Nasiriya	1–0	1–0	0–1	3–2	1–1	0–0	—	3–0	1–1	2–2	0–3	2–1
Al-Samawa	2–1	1–1	3–2 (Note: The Al-Samawa–Al-Jolan match was awarded as a 0–3 win to Al-Jolan, as Al-Samawa involved an unregistered player for the team in the game, and the actual result of the match was a 3–2 victory for Al-Samawa. However, the appeals committee later overturned the ruling, reinstating the actual result.)	1–2	0–2	0–0	1–1	—	1–1	0–0	1–0	0–1
Al-Shirqat	4–1	0–0	0–1	2–1	0–2	1–2	3–0	2–0	—	1–1	0–0	0–0
Al-Sulaikh	2–3	3–0	1–1	1–0	1–2	1–3	1–0	1–1	0–0	—	0–1	0–0
Diyala	2–1	2–1	0–0	0–0	3–0	1–0	3–1	2–1	0–1	1–0	—	1–0
Masafi Al-Wasat	1–0	2–1	2–0	1–1	0–3	0–0	1–0	2–1	0–0	2–1	0–1	—

Updated to match(es) played on 2 May 2023. Source: IFA official website
Legend: Blue = home team win; Yellow = draw; Red = away team win.

== Final ==
2 June 2023
18:00 UTC+3

Al-Minaa	2–1	Amanat Baghdad
Alaa 6'; Ahmed 37'	Report	Bari 53'

Al-Fayhaa Stadium, Basra
Referee: Mohannad Manaf

Al-Minaa	Amanat Baghdad

GK	22	(Iraq) Ali Faisal
RB	30	(Iraq) Karrar Jumaa	(yellow card) 72' (yellow-red card) 90+5'
CB	42	(Iraq) Abdullah Mohsin (c)	(yellow card) 71'	(substituted off) 71'
CB	33	(Iraq) Abbas Yas
LB	36	(Iraq) Hassan Odah		(substituted off) 78'
CM	37	(Iraq) Haider Salem
CM	15	(Iraq) Mohammed Khudhair
CM	7	(Iraq) Ayad Abed Farhan		(substituted off) 78'
RF	12	(Iraq) Karrar Jaafar	(yellow card) 45+4'
CF	18	(Iraq) Salem Ahmed
LF	26	(Iraq) Sajjad Alaa
Substitutions:
GK	1	(Iraq) Jaafar Shenaishil
DF	17	(Iraq) Haider Sari		(substituted on) 78'
MF	28	(Iraq) Hamza Hadi Ahmed		(substituted on) 78'
MF	47	(Iraq) Mohammed Salah
DF	55	(Iraq) Mohammed Abdul-Zahra		(substituted on) 71'
Manager:
(Iraq) Fareed Majeed

GK	21	(Iraq) Sarhang Muhsin (c)		(substituted off) 46'
RB	4	(Iraq) Milad Falah	(yellow card) 65'
CB	44	(Iraq) Mohammed Musa	(yellow card) 90+4'
CB	14	(Jordan) Yousef Al-Alousi
LB	13	(Iraq) Ayman Rezayej		(substituted off) 65'
CM	42	(Senegal) Babacar Charles Faye		(substituted off) 46'
CM	7	(Ivory Coast) Sadia Olivier Bleu
CM	9	(Iraq) Karrar Ali Bari
RF	10	(Iraq) Jabbar Karim		(substituted off) 46'
CF	31	(Nigeria) Oladayo Alabi
LF	11	(Iraq) Muntadhar Rahim		(substituted off) 46'
Substitutions:
MF	17	(Iraq) Mustafa Falah		(substituted on) 46'
GK	23	(Iraq) Munther Najem		(substituted on) 46'
FW	28	(Iraq) Mohammed Ahmed		(substituted on) 46'
DF	39	(Iraq) Ahmed Nadhim		(substituted on) 65'
MF	77	(Iraq) Nabeel Sabah		(substituted on) 46'
Manager:
(Iraq) Wissam Talib

Match officials

- Assistant referees:
  - Akram Ismail
  - Ali Mazin
- Fourth official: Wamidh Mahmoud

Match rules

- 90 minutes.
- Penalty shootout if scores still level.
- Maximum of five substitutions

== Season statistics ==
=== Top scorers ===
Rank	Player	Club	Goals
1	(Iraq) Mohammed Hassan	Maysan	13
2	(Iraq) Omar Attallah	Al-Shirqat	12
3	(Iraq) Salem Ahmed	Al-Minaa	11
4	(Ivory Coast) Ismaël Mohamed	Al-Sinaat Al-Kahrabaiya	8
4	(Iraq) Ali Karim	Diyala	8
6	(Brazil) Dioguinho	Al-Minaa	7
6	(Iraq) Saleh Motlaq	Peshmerga Sulaymaniya	7
6	(Iraq) Aba-Thar Abdul-Sada	Masafi Al-Wasat	7
9	(Nigeria) Michael Ohanu	Al-Bahri	6
9	(Iraq) Sajjad Alaa	Al-Minaa	6
9	(Iraq) Mohammed Abbas	Peshmerga Sulaymaniya	6
9	(Nigeria) Donatus Edafe	Al-Jolan	6

==== Hat-tricks ====
Player	For	Against	Result	Date
(Iraq) Abdullah Ammar	Al-Difaa Al-Madani	Al-Etisalat	3–0 (H)	18 December 2022
(Iraq) Mohammed Hassan	Maysan	Al-Hawija	4–1 (A)	1 May 2023

Notes

(H) – Home team
(A) – Away team
