= 2021–22 Iraqi First Division League =

Iraqi First Division League
- Season: 2021–22
- Dates: 12 October 2021 – 19 April 2022
- Champions: Al-Hudood (1st title)
- Promoted: Al-Hudood; Karbalaa; Duhok
- Relegated: Ghaz Al-Shamal; Suq Al-Shuyukh; Babil; Al-Alam

The 2021–22 Iraqi First Division League was the 48th season of what is now called the Iraqi Premier Division League, the second tier of the Iraqi football league system, since its establishment in 1974. The number of clubs in the league have varied throughout history for various reasons; in this season the number of clubs has been reduced from 28 teams to 24. The top two teams are directly promoted to the Iraqi Premier League, while the bottom 4 teams in each group are directly relegated to the Iraqi Second Division League. The season started on 12 October 2021 and ended 19 April 2022, while the summer transfer window began on August 1 and ended on midnight on September 19.

Al-Hudood won the title by beating Karbalaa 1–0 in the final at Al-Shaab Stadium, with both teams securing promotion.

== Overview ==
=== Changes ===
In November 2020, The Iraq FA announced that the number of teams will decrease from 28 to 24 in total starting from 2021-2022 season. To make these changes possible, the Iraq FA announced that in 2020–21 season, The top teams in each group are directly promoted to the Premier League, while 8 teams in total are directly relegated to Second Division League.

== Teams ==
A total of 24 teams are contesting the league, including 21 sides from the 2020-2021 season and the 3 relegated sides from the Iraqi Premier League. There are no promoted teams participating in this season because of the recent changes necessary to adjustment to having 24 teams possible this season.

=== 2021–22 season ===
Locations of the 2021–22 Iraqi First Division League teams

Team	Manager	Location	Stadium	Capacity
Afak	(Iraq) Haider Hussein	Al-Qādisiyyah, Diwaniya	Al-Kifl Stadium	10,000
Al-Alam	(Iraq) Ali Jawad	Saladin	Al-Alam Stadium	10,000
Al-Bahri	(Iraq) Asaad Abdul Razzaq	Basra, Al-Jubaila	Al-Bahri Stadium	7,000
Al-Difaa Al-Madani	(Iraq) Mahdi Kadhim	Baghdad	Al-Taji Stadium	5,000
Al-Hussein	(Iraq) Kadhim Yousef	Baghdad, Sadr City	Five Thousand Stadium	5,000
Al-Jinsiya	(Iraq) Karim Qumbil	Baghdad	Al-Jinsiya Stadium	5,000
Al-Kufa	(Iraq) Adel Ali Al-Aasam	Najaf, Kufa	Najaf Stadium	12,000
Al-Muroor	(Iraq) Adel Ajer	Baghdad, Sadr City	Al-Walaa Stadium	5,000
Al-Nasiriya	(Iraq) Ali Wahaib	Dhi Qar, Nasiriya	An Nasiriya Stadium	10,000
Al-Ramadi	(Iraq) Khamis Hammoud	Anbar, Ramadi	Al Ramadi Stadium	10,000
Al-Shirqat	(Iraq) Mohammed Attiya	Saladin, Shirqat	Shirqat Stadium	5,000
Al-Sulaikh	(Iraq) Rashid Sultan	Baghdad, Suleikh	Al Sulaikh Stadium	5,000
Babylon	(Iraq) Fouad Jawad	Babylon	Al Kifl Stadium	10,000
Diyala	(Iraq) Ali Abdullah	Diyala, Baquba	Ba'quba Stadium	10,000
Duhok	(Iraq) Adel Nasser	Duhok	Duhok Stadium	20,000
Ghaz Al-Shamal	(Iraq) Walid Mohammed Qader	Kirkuk	Kirkuk Olympic Stadium	20,000
Karbalaa	(Iraq) Ali Wahab	Karbala	Karbala Sports City	30,000
Masafi Al-Junoob	(Iraq) Nasser Talla Dahilan	Basra, Shaibah	Masafi Al-Junoob Stadium	5,000
Maysan	(Iraq) Ahmed Zuhair	Maysan	Maysan Stadium	25,000
Peshmerga Sulaymaniya	(Iraq) Arsalan Jalal	Sulaymaniyah	Peshmerga Stadium	10,000
Suq Al-Shuyukh	(Iraq) Moayad Tomeh	Dhi Qar, Suq Al-Shuyukh	Souk Al-Shuyukh Stadium	5,000
Al-Hudood	(Iraq) Abbas Attiya	Baghdad	Al-Taji Stadium	5,000
Al-Sinaat Al-Kahrabaiya	(Iraq) Adel Nima	Baghdad	Al-Sinaa Stadium	10,000
Al-Samawa	(Iraq) Aqeel Ghani	Al-Samawa	Al-Samawah Stadium	5,000

== League table ==
=== Group 1 ===
Pos	Team	Pld	W	D	L	GF	GA	GD	Pts	Qualification or relegation
1	Al-Hudood (C, P)	21	11	8	2	32	12	+20	41	Promotion to the Iraqi Premier League
2	Duhok (O, P)	21	9	7	5	25	19	+6	34	Qualification for the Third place play-off
3	Al-Kufa	21	9	6	6	28	23	+5	33 (Note: Al-Kufa finished ahead of Al-Ramadi on head-to-head points: Al-Kufa 1–0 Al-Ramadi, Al-Ramadi 1–1 Al-Kufa.)	
4	Al-Ramadi	21	7	12	2	30	20	+10	33	
5	Afak	21	9	4	8	33	26	+7	31	
6	Maysan	21	8	6	7	32	26	+6	30	
7	Al-Difaa Al-Madani	21	8	5	8	23	28	−5	29	
8	Al-Sulaikh	21	6	10	5	26	23	+3	28 (Note: Al-Sulaikh finished ahead of Masafi Al-Junoob on head-to-head points: Al-Sulaikh 2–1 Masafi Al-Junoob, Masafi Al-Junoob 1–2 Al-Sulaikh.)	
9	Masafi Al-Junoob	21	8	4	9	33	28	+5	28	
10	Al-Muroor	21	7	5	9	22	28	−6	26	
11	Suq Al-Shuyukh (R)	21	1	8	12	16	44	−28	11	Relegation to Iraqi Second Division League
12	Al-Alam (Note: Al-Alam withdrew from the league after 16 matches, with their results from the second round-robin being annulled.) (R)	11	0	1	10	5	28	−23	1	Relegation to Iraqi Second Division League

Updated to match(es) played on 12 April 2022. Source: IFA official website
Rules for classification: 1) points; 2) head-to-head points; 3) head-to-head goal difference; 4) goal difference; 5) number of wins; 6) number of goals scored.
(C) Champions; (O) Play-off winners; (P) Promoted; (R) Relegated

==== Results ====
Home \ Away	AFK	ALM	DFM	HUD	KUF	MUR	RAM	SUL	DUH	MSJ	MAY	SUQ
Afak	—	—	0–2	1–2	1–0	1–0	0–1	3–2	2–0	1–1	3–1	7–2
Al-Alam (Note: Al-Alam withdrew from the league after 16 matches, with their results from the second round-robin being annulled.)	0–2	—	0–1	—	0–2	– (Note: Al-Alam's results home to Maysan (1–1 draw), away to Al-Difaa Al-Madani (3–1 loss), home to Suq Al-Shuyukh (1–0 win), away to Al-Kufa (1–0 win) and home to Al-Muroor (3–0 loss) were annulled after their withdrawal from the league.)	1–5	—	1–2	—	–	–
Al-Difaa Al-Madani	1–4	–	—	2–2	0–2	0–1	0–0	1–1	0–1	2–1	3–2	1–1
Al-Hudood	1–1	3–0 (Note: The Al-Hudood – Al-Alam match was awarded a 3–0 win for Al-Hudood, as Al-Alam did not turn up for the game.)	0–1	—	0–1	2–0	1–1	0–0	0–0	1–0	2–1	4–0
Al-Kufa	1–0	–	2–0	0–3	—	0–0	1–0	0–0	1–1	2–2	2–1	3–1
Al-Muroor	2–1	1–2	4–1	0–1	2–1	—	3–5	2–1	1–0	2–1	2–1	1–1
Al-Ramadi	1–1	—	1–1	0–0	1–1	1–0	—	1–1	1–1	3–2	1–1	0–0
Al-Sulaikh	2–1	4–0	0–1	1–1	2–2	1–1	1–1	—	2–1	2–1	0–2	2–0
Duhok	2–0	—	4–0	0–0	2–1	1–0	1–2	1–1	—	1–1	1–0	3–1
Masafi Al-Junoob	1–0	5–1	2–0	2–3	4–3	3–0	1–0	1–2	0–2	—	0–0	1–0
Maysan	4–2	0–0	0–2	1–1	3–2	1–1	1–3	3–1	1–1	1–0	—	3–0
Suq Al-Shuyukh	1–1	2–1	0–4	0–2	0–1	1–1	2–2	0–0	1–1	2–4	1–3	—

Updated to match(es) played on 12 April 2022. Source: IFA official website
Legend: Blue = home team win; Yellow = draw; Red = away team win.

=== Group 2 ===
Pos	Team	Pld	W	D	L	GF	GA	GD	Pts	Qualification or relegation
1	Karbalaa (P)	22	13	8	1	33	13	+20	47	Promotion to the Iraqi Premier League
2	Al-Nasiriya	22	12	7	3	28	16	+12	43 (Note: Al-Nasiriya finished ahead of Peshmerga Sulaymaniya on head-to-head points: Al-Nasiriya 2–1 Peshmerga Sulaymaniya, Peshmerga Sulaymaniya 1–1 Al-Nasiriya.)	Qualification for the Third place play-off
3	Peshmerga Sulaymaniya	22	12	7	3	36	13	+23	43	
4	Al-Sinaat Al-Kahrabaiya	22	7	10	5	24	17	+7	31 (Note: Al-Sinaat Al-Kahrabaiya finished ahead of Diyala on head-to-head points: Diyala 0–1 Al-Sinaat Al-Kahrabaiya, Al-Sinaat Al-Kahrabaiya 1–1 Diyala.)	
5	Diyala	22	8	7	7	24	27	−3	31	
6	Al-Bahri	22	6	11	5	24	24	0	29	
7	Al-Samawa	22	6	9	7	18	23	−5	27	
8	Al-Jinsiya	22	5	9	8	27	29	−2	24	
9	Al-Hussein	22	5	7	10	21	24	−3	22	
10	Al-Shirqat	22	4	9	9	23	30	−7	21	
11	Ghaz Al-Shamal (R)	22	2	13	7	13	26	−13	19	Relegation to Iraqi Second Division League
12	Babil (R)	22	3	1	18	9	38	−29	10	Relegation to Iraqi Second Division League

Updated to match(es) played on 12 April 2022. Source: IFA official website
Rules for classification: 1) points; 2) head-to-head points; 3) head-to-head goal difference; 4) goal difference; 5) number of wins; 6) number of goals scored.
(P) Promoted; (R) Relegated

==== Results ====
Home \ Away	BAH	JIN	HUS	NAS	SMA	SNK	SRQ	BAB	DIY	GSH	KRB	PES
Al-Bahri	—	3–1	2–1	1–1	2–2	1–1	2–2	0–1	0–0	1–1	2–0	0–0
Al-Jinsiya	2–2	—	1–1	0–1	2–3	0–0	1–1	3–0 (Note: The Al-Jinsiya – Babil match was awarded a 3–0 win for Al-Jinsiya, as Babil did not turn up for the game.)	2–1	1–2	2–3	1–1
Al-Hussein	0–1	1–2	—	3–0	2–0	1–2	0–3	3–0 (Note: The Al-Hussein – Babil match was awarded a 3–0 win for Al-Hussein, as Babil did not turn up for the game.)	2–2	2–0	1–1	0–1
Al-Nasiriya	2–1	1–1	1–0	—	3–0	2–1	3–0	1–0	2–0	3–0	1–1	2–1
Al-Samawa	0–0	2–1	0–0	1–2	—	0–0	1–0	3–0	0–0	0–0	2–2	2–1
Al-Sinaat Al-Kahrabaiya	1–2	1–1	1–0	0–0	0–0	—	2–0	5–1	1–1	1–1	2–2	1–2
Al-Shirqat	2–0	1–1	0–1	0–0	2–1	1–2	—	2–1	3–4	3–3	0–0	0–0
Babil	0–1	0–2	2–1	0–1	0–1	0–3	2–1	—	1–2	0–1	0–1	0–1
Diyala	1–0	0–2	1–1	2–1	1–0	0–1	1–1	3–1	—	3–1	0–0	1–2
Ghaz Al-Shamal	1–1	1–1	0–0	0–0	0–0	0–0	0–0	0–0	0–1	—	0–3	2–2
Karbalaa	3–0	1–0	1–1	3–0	1–0	1–0	2–1	1–0	2–0	3–0	—	0–0
Peshmerga Sulaymaniya	2–2	3–0	3–0	1–1	4–0	1–0	3–0 (Note: The Peshmerga Sulaymaniya – Al-Shirqat match was awarded a 3–0 win for Peshmerga Sulaymaniya, as Al-Shirqat did not turn up for the game.)	2–0	4–0	1–0	1–2	—

Updated to match(es) played on 12 April 2022. Source: IFA official website
Legend: Blue = home team win; Yellow = draw; Red = away team win.

== Third place ==
5 September 2022
18:00 UTC+03:00

Duhok	2–2	Al-Nasiriya
Salman 15'; Delli 22'		Talib 25', 75'
Penalties
Zakri (penalty scored); Adnan (penalty scored); Agid (penalty scored); Kawfand (penalty scored); Saeed (penalty scored)	5–3	(penalty scored) Sadeq; (penalty missed) Ali; (penalty scored) Mohammed; (penalty scored) Basheer

Al-Madina Stadium, Baghdad
Referee: Zaid Thamer Mohammed

== Final ==
19 April 2022
22:00 UTC+03:00

Al-Hudood	1–0	Karbalaa
Yassin 13'

Al-Shaab Stadium, Baghdad

== Play-off ==
10 September 2022
18:00 UTC+03:00

Amanat Baghdad	0–2	Duhok
		Agyemang 15'; Delli 81'

Al-Madina Stadium, Baghdad
Referee: Ahmed Kadhim
