= 2020–21 Iraqi First Division League =

Iraqi First Division League
- Season: 2020–21
- Dates: 3 May 2021 – 16 July 2021
- Champions: Al-Sinaa (1st title)
- Promoted: Al-Sinaa; Newroz; Samarra
- Relegated: Akkad; Al-Ettifaq; Al-Jaish; Brayati
- Matches played: 184
- Goals scored: 469 (2.55 per match)
- Top goalscorer: Samer Mohsin (12 goals)
- Biggest home win: Babil 5–0 Al-Ettifaq (8 June 2021)
- Biggest away win: Suq Al-Shuyukh 1–4 Masafi Al-Janoob (2 June 2021)
- Highest scoring: Diyala 4–3 Al-Ramadi (4 March 2021); Al-Muroor 3–4 Samarra (4 March 2021)
- Longest winning run: 6 matches Al-Sinaa
- Longest unbeaten run: 14 matches Al-Sinaa
- Longest winless run: 12 matches Akkad; Maysan
- Longest losing run: 9 matches Brayati
- All statistics correct as of 30 July 2021.

The 2020–21 Iraqi First Division League was the 47th season of what is now called the Iraqi Premier Division League, the second tier of the Iraqi football league system, since its establishment in 1974. The number of clubs in the league have changed throughout history due to several factors, most recently in this season when the number of clubs increased from 12 to 28 in total. The top team from each group is directly promoted to the Premier League, while a third club can be promoted through play-offs, on the other hand, two clubs from each group are directly relegated to the Second Division League.

Al-Sinaa won the title and were promoted alongside runners-up Newroz.

== Format ==
Teams from all over Iraq participated in preliminary qualifications for the final stage. Total of 16 teams qualified for the final stage and 12 teams joined from previous season.

There was no First Division League nor Premier League season completed in the prior year due to the Coronavirus Pandemic.

== Teams ==
=== Stadiums and locations ===
Locations of the 2020–21 Iraqi First Division League teams

A total of 28 teams are contesting the league, including 10 sides from the 2018-2019 season, 16 promoted teams from the preliminary qualifications for the final stage and the two relegated sides from the Premier League.

| Team | Manager | Location | Stadium | Capacity |
|---|---|---|---|---|
| Afak | (Iraq) Haider Hussein | Al-Qādisiyyah (Diwaniya) | Al-Kifl Stadium | 10,000 |
| Akkad | (Iraq) Bassim Obaid | Dhi Qar (Al-Shatrah) | Al Shatrah Stadium | 7,500 |
| Al-Alam | (Iraq) Ali Jawad | Saladin | Al-Alam Stadium | 10,000 |
| Al-Bahri | (Iraq) Asaad Abdul Razzaq | Basra (Al-Jubaila) | Al-Bahri Stadium | 7,000 |
| Al-Difaa Al-Madani | (Iraq) Mahdi Kadhim | Baghdad | Al-Taji Stadium | 5,000 |
| Al-Ettifaq | (Iraq) Abdul Zahra Odeh | Al-Qādisiyyah (Diwaniya) | Al-Diwaniya Stadium | 5,000 |
| Al-Hussein | (Iraq) Kadhim Yousef | Baghdad (Sadr City) | Five Thousand Stadium | 5,000 |
| Al-Jaish | (Iraq) Maher Ohkla | Baghdad | Al-Jaish Stadium | 6,000 |
| Al-Jinsiya | (Iraq) Karim Qumbil | Baghdad | Al-Jinsiya Stadium | 5,000 |
| Al-Kufa | (Iraq) Adel Ali Al-Aasam | Najaf (Kufa) | Najaf Stadium | 12,000 |
| Al-Muroor | (Iraq) Adel Ajer | Baghdad (Sadr City) | Al-Walaa Stadium | 5,000 |
| Al-Nasiriya | (Iraq) Ali Wahaib | Dhi Qar (Nasiriya) | An Nasiriya Stadium | 10,000 |
| Al-Ramadi | (Iraq) Khamis Hammoud | Anbar (Ramadi) | Al Ramadi Stadium | 10,000 |
| Al-Shirqat | (Iraq) Mohammed Attiya | Saladin (Shirqat) | Shirqat Stadium | 5,000 |
| Al-Sinaa | (Iraq) Sadeq Hanoon | Baghdad (Sadr City) | Al-Sinaa Stadium | 10,000 |
| Al-Sulaikh | (Iraq) Rashid Sultan | Baghdad (Suleikh) | Al Sulaikh Stadium | 5,000 |
| Babil | (Iraq) Fouad Jawad | Babil | Al Kifl Stadium | 10,000 |
| Brayati | (Iraq) Mahmoud Majeed | Erbil | Franso Hariri Stadium | 25,000 |
| Diyala | (Iraq) Ali Abdullah | Diyala (Baquba) | Ba'quba Stadium | 10,000 |
| Duhok | (Iraq) Adel Nasser | Duhok | Duhok Stadium | 20,000 |
| Ghaz Al-Shamal | (Iraq) Walid Mohammed Qader | Kirkuk | Kirkuk Olympic Stadium | 20,000 |
| Karbalaa | (Iraq) Ali Wahab | Karbala | Karbala Sports City | 30,000 |
| Masafi Al-Janoob | (Iraq) Nasser Talla Dahilan | Basra (Shaibah) | Masafi Al-Janoob Stadium | 5,000 |
| Maysan | (Iraq) Ahmed Zuhair | Maysan | Maysan Stadium | 25,000 |
| Newroz | (Iraq) Wali Karim | Sulaymaniyah | Zanko Stadium | 15,000 |
| Peshmerga | (Iraq) Arsalan Jalal | Sulaymaniyah | Peshmerga Stadium | 10,000 |
| Samarra | (Iraq) Ahmed Kadhim | Saladin (Samarra) | Samarra Stadium | 10,000 |
| Suq Al-Shuyukh | (Iraq) Moayad Tomeh | Dhi Qar (Suq Al-Shuyukh) | Souk Al-Shuyukh Stadium | 5,000 |

== League table ==
=== Group 1 ===
| Pos | Team | Pld | W | D | L | GF | GA | GD | Pts | Qualification or relegation |
|---|---|---|---|---|---|---|---|---|---|---|
| 1 | Newroz (P) | 13 | 9 | 3 | 1 | 27 | 11 | +16 | 30 | Promotion to the Iraqi Premier League |
| 2 | Afak | 13 | 8 | 5 | 0 | 26 | 13 | +13 | 29 | Qualification for the Third-place play-off |
| 3 | Masafi Al-Janoob | 13 | 7 | 4 | 2 | 27 | 17 | +10 | 25 | |
| 4 | Al-Difaa Al-Madani | 13 | 4 | 8 | 1 | 15 | 10 | +5 | 20 | |
| 5 | Al-Shirqat | 13 | 5 | 4 | 4 | 15 | 12 | +3 | 19 | |
| 6 | Karbalaa | 13 | 4 | 7 | 2 | 12 | 13 | −1 | 19 | |
| 7 | Al-Alam | 13 | 4 | 6 | 3 | 17 | 17 | 0 | 18 | |
| 8 | Al-Hussein | 13 | 3 | 6 | 4 | 17 | 19 | −2 | 15 | |
| 9 | Suq Al-Shuyukh | 13 | 4 | 3 | 6 | 12 | 19 | −7 | 15 | |
| 10 | Al-Kufa | 13 | 2 | 6 | 5 | 15 | 19 | −4 | 12 | |
| 11 | Ghaz Al-Shamal | 13 | 3 | 3 | 7 | 13 | 18 | −5 | 12 | |
| 12 | Al-Jinsiya | 13 | 2 | 5 | 6 | 11 | 15 | −4 | 11 | |
| 13 | Al-Jaish (R) | 13 | 2 | 4 | 7 | 12 | 20 | −8 | 10 | Relegation to Iraqi Second Division League |
| 14 | Brayati (R) | 13 | 2 | 0 | 11 | 13 | 29 | −16 | 6 | Relegation to Iraqi Second Division League |

Updated to match(es) played on 28 July 2021. Source: IFA official website
Rules for classification: 1) points; 2) goal difference; 3) number of goals scored.
(P) Promoted; (R) Relegated

==== Results ====
| Home \ Away | AFK | ALM | DFM | HUS | JSH | JIN | KUF | SRQ | BRA | GSH | KRB | MSJ | NEW | SUQ |
|---|---|---|---|---|---|---|---|---|---|---|---|---|---|---|
| Afak | — | — | 1–1 | 4–2 | — | 1–1 | 3–1 | — | 4–1 | 3–2 | — | — | 2–0 | — |
| Al-Alam | 1–1 | — | — | — | — | — | — | 0–0 | — | 1–3 | 0–0 | 1–3 | — | 0–0 |
| Al-Difaa Al-Madani | — | 2–3 | — | — | — | — | — | 1–0 | 2–1 | 1–1 | 0–0 | — | 1–1 | 3–0 |
| Al-Hussein | — | 2–2 | 0–0 | — | — | 1–1 | — | 2–0 | — | 1–2 | — | — | 2–2 | 0–1 |
| Al-Jaish | 0–1 | 0–2 | 0–0 | 2–2 | — | 0–2 | 1–1 | — | 3–1 | — | — | — | — | — |
| Al-Jinsiya | — | 1–3 | 0–0 | — | — | — | — | 1–1 | — | — | 0–1 | 1–2 | 0–1 | — |
| Al-Kufa | — | 0–0 | 3–3 | 1–2 | — | 1–2 | — | — | — | 1–0 | — | — | 2–2 | — |
| Al-Shirqat | 2–3 | — | — | — | 1–0 | — | 1–0 | — | 4–1 | — | 3–0 | 1–1 | — | 1–1 |
| Brayati | — | 2–3 | — | 0–1 | — | 2–1 | 1–2 | — | — | 0–1 | — | — | 1–3 | — |
| Ghaz Al-Shamal | — | — | — | — | 2–4 | 1–1 | — | 0–1 | — | — | 0–0 | 1–3 | 0–1 | 0–1 |
| Karbalaa | 1–1 | — | — | 1–1 | 1–1 | — | 1–0 | — | 2–1 | — | — | 2–2 | — | 3–2 |
| Masafi Al-Janoob | 0–0 | — | 0–1 | 3–1 | 2–1 | — | 2–2 | — | 3–1 | — | — | — | — | — |
| Newroz | — | 3–1 | — | — | 2–0 | — | — | 2–0 | — | — | 2–0 | 4–2 | — | 4–0 |
| Suq Al-Shuyukh | 1–2 | — | — | — | 3–0 | 1–0 | 1–1 | — | 0–1 | — | — | 1–4 | — | — |

Updated to match(es) played on 3 July 2021. Source: IFA official website
Legend: Blue = home team win; Yellow = draw; Red = away team win.
For upcoming matches, an "a" indicates there is an article about the rivalry between the two participants.

=== Group 2 ===
| Pos | Team | Pld | W | D | L | GF | GA | GD | Pts | Qualification or relegation |
|---|---|---|---|---|---|---|---|---|---|---|
| 1 | Al-Sinaa (C, P) | 13 | 11 | 2 | 0 | 24 | 8 | +16 | 35 | Promotion to the Iraqi Premier League |
| 2 | Samaraa (O, P) | 13 | 8 | 3 | 2 | 27 | 17 | +10 | 27 | Qualification for the Third-place play-off |
| 3 | Al-Ramadi | 13 | 8 | 1 | 4 | 24 | 14 | +10 | 25 | |
| 4 | Duhok | 13 | 8 | 1 | 4 | 17 | 13 | +4 | 25 | |
| 5 | Al-Bahri | 13 | 6 | 2 | 5 | 17 | 12 | +5 | 20 | |
| 6 | Al-Muroor | 13 | 4 | 5 | 4 | 17 | 17 | 0 | 17 | |
| 7 | Al-Nasiriya | 13 | 4 | 5 | 4 | 14 | 15 | −1 | 17 | |
| 8 | Al-Sulaikh | 13 | 3 | 6 | 4 | 13 | 14 | −1 | 15 | |
| 9 | Peshmerga | 13 | 3 | 6 | 4 | 14 | 18 | −4 | 15 | |
| 10 | Diyala | 13 | 3 | 5 | 5 | 21 | 23 | −2 | 14 | |
| 11 | Babil | 13 | 2 | 4 | 7 | 14 | 16 | −2 | 10 | |
| 12 | Maysan | 13 | 1 | 7 | 5 | 9 | 19 | −10 | 10 | |
| 13 | Akkad (R) | 13 | 1 | 5 | 7 | 13 | 22 | −9 | 8 | Relegation to Iraqi Second Division League |
| 14 | Al-Ettefaq (R) | 13 | 1 | 4 | 8 | 11 | 27 | −16 | 7 | Relegation to Iraqi Second Division League |

Updated to match(es) played on 28 July 2021. Source: IFA official website
Rules for classification: 1) points; 2) goal difference; 3) number of goals scored.
(C) Champions; (O) Play-off winners; (P) Promoted; (R) Relegated

==== Results ====
| Home \ Away | AKD | BAH | ETF | MUR | NAS | RAM | SIN | SUL | BAB | DIY | DUH | MAY | PES | SAM |
|---|---|---|---|---|---|---|---|---|---|---|---|---|---|---|
| Akkad | — | 1–3 | 0–0 | 1–2 | 2–0 | 0–2 | — | — | — | — | 0–1 | — | — | 2–4 |
| Al-Bahri | — | — | — | — | 1–1 | — | 0–1 | 1–2 | 1–0 | — | 1–2 | 2–1 | 3–0 (Note: The Al-Bahri–Peshmerga match was awarded as a 3–0 win to Al-Bahri, as Peshmerga did not turn up for the game.) | — |
| Al-Ettefaq | — | 1–2 | — | — | — | — | 1–3 | 1–1 | — | 2–4 | 0–1 | 1–1 | — | — |
| Al-Muroor | — | 1–1 | 4–2 | — | 1–1 | 2–2 | 0–1 | — | 1–0 | — | — | — | — | 3–4 |
| Al-Nasiriya | — | — | 0–1 | — | — | 1–0 | 1–2 | — | 1–1 | — | 2–1 | — | — | 0–2 |
| Al-Ramadi | — | 1–0 | 2–1 | — | — | — | 1–2 | 3–1 | 1–0 | — | 4–0 | — | 2–0 | — |
| Al-Sinaa | 2–2 | — | — | — | — | — | — | 2–1 | — | 2–1 | 1–0 | 4–0 | 3–1 | — |
| Al-Sulaikh | 2–0 | — | — | 0–1 | 1–1 | — | — | — | — | 2–2 | — | 0–0 | 1–1 | 0–0 |
| Babil | 1–1 | — | 5–0 | — | — | — | 0–1 | 1–2 | — | 2–1 | — | 1–1 | 1–2 | — |
| Diyala | 2–2 | 0–2 | — | 2–1 | 1–2 | 4–3 | — | — | — | — | — | — | — | 1–2 |
| Duhok | — | — | — | 2–0 | — | — | — | 1–0 | 2–0 | 2–2 | — | 3–0 | 2–1 | — |
| Maysan | 1–1 | — | — | 1–1 | 1–3 | 0–1 | — | — | — | 0–0 | — | — | 0–0 | 3–2 |
| Peshmerga | 2–1 | — | 1–1 | 0–0 | 1–1 | — | — | — | — | 1–1 | — | — | — | 4–2 |
| Samaraa | — | 1–0 | 3–0 (Note: The Samarra–Al-Ettefaq match was awarded as a 3–0 win to Samarra, as Al-Ettefaq did not turn up for the game.) | — | — | 3–2 | 0–0 | — | 2–2 | — | 2–0 | — | — | — |

Updated to match(es) played on 4 July 2021. Source: IFA official website
Legend: Blue = home team win; Yellow = draw; Red = away team win.
For upcoming matches, an "a" indicates there is an article about the rivalry between the two participants.

== Third place ==
11 July 2021
14:00 GMT

| Afak | 0 – 1 | Samaraa |
|---|---|---|
| | Report | Adnan 38' (pen.) |

Al-Saher Ahmed Radhi Stadium, Baghdad
Attendance: 0
Referee: Salem Amer

== Final ==
16 July 2021
14:00 GMT

| Newroz | 0 – 1 | Al-Sinaa |
|---|---|---|
| | Report | Keke 82' |

Al-Taji Stadium, Baghdad
Attendance: 0
Referee: Ahmed Kadhim

== Play-offs ==
30 July 2021
15:00 GMT

| Al-Sinaat Al-Kahrabaiya | 1 – 1 | Samaraa |
|---|---|---|
| Mahmoud 57' (pen.) | Report | Adnan (penalty missed) 38’ Mohammed 53' |
Penalties
| Shaibani (penalty missed); Malik (penalty scored); Noori (penalty scored); Mohammed (penalty missed) | 2–4 | (penalty scored) Saadi; (penalty scored) Al-Dahi; (penalty missed) Abdullah; (penalty scored) Abdul-Hassan; (penalty scored) Motlaq |

Al-Shaab Stadium, Baghdad
Attendance: 0
Referee: Mohanad Qasim Sarray

== Season statistics ==
As of 16 July 2021

=== Top scorers ===
| Rank | Player | Club | Goals |
|---|---|---|---|
| 1 | (Iraq) Samer Mohsin | Afak | 12 |
| 2 | (Iraq) Hussein Ibrahim | Al-Alam | 10 |
| 2 | (Iraq) Ahmed Turki | Akkad | 10 |
| 4 | (Iraq) Salih Motlaq | Samarra | 9 |
| 5 | (Nigeria) Donatus Edafe | Al-Nasiriya | 8 |
| 5 | (Iraq) Fadhel Wasmi | Masafi Al-Janoob | 8 |
| 5 | (Iraq) Ahmed Sabri | Duhok | 8 |
| 8 | (Ivory Coast) Cissé | Al-Ramadi | 7 |
| 8 | (Iraq) Husham Ahmed | Al-Difaa Al-Madani | 7 |
| 8 | (Ivory Coast) Jean-Christian Keke | Al-Sinaa | 7 |
