= 2022–23 Iraq FA Cup =

Tournament details
- Country: Iraq
- Dates: 1 November 2022 – 5 August 2023
- Teams: 83

Final positions
- Champions: Al-Quwa Al-Jawiya (6th title)
- Runners-up: Erbil

Tournament statistics
- Matches played: 86
- Goals scored: 193 (2.24 per match)

The 2022–23 Iraq FA Cup was the 33rd edition of the Iraqi knockout football cup as a club competition, the main domestic cup in Iraqi football, featuring clubs from the top three tiers of the Iraqi football league system (Iraqi Premier League, Iraqi First Division League and Iraqi Second Division League). The competition began on 1 November 2022 with the first round, and the final was played on 5 August 2023 at Al-Shaab Stadium in Baghdad.

The winners of the competition were Al-Quwa Al-Jawiya, who won their sixth title with a 1–0 victory over Erbil.

== Schedule ==
The rounds of the 2022–23 competition are scheduled as follows:

| Round | Draw date | Match dates |
|---|---|---|
| First round | 27 October 2022 | 1–3 November 2022 |
| Second round | 27 October 2022 | 5–7 November 2022 |
| Third round | 27 October 2022 | 10–15 November 2022 |
| Round of 32 | 21 February 2023 | 7–25 March 2023 |
| Round of 16 | 3 April 2023 | 13 April 2023 – 16 May 2023 |
| Quarter-finals | 23 May 2023 | 25–26 July 2023 |
| Semi-finals | 27 July 2023 | 31 July 2023 – 1 August 2023 |
| Final | 27 July 2023 | 5 August 2023 |

== First round ==
Masafi Al-Junoob, Al-Ghadhriya and Afak received byes to the second round.

Baghdad Section

| 1 November 2022 | Al-Adala | 0–1 | Masafi Al-Wasat | Baghdad |
| 14:30 UTC+03:00 | | | | Stadium: Al-Walaa Stadium; Referee: Hussein Subih |

| 1 November 2022 | Al-Jinsiya | 0–3 (w/o) | Al-Tijara | Baghdad |
| 14:30 UTC+03:00 |

| 1 November 2022 | Al-Sulaikh | 0–1 | Amanat Baghdad | Baghdad |
| 14:30 UTC+03:00 | | | | Stadium: Five Thousand Stadium; Referee: Jamal Abdul-Ridha |

| 1 November 2022 | Al-Najda | 0–0 (2–4 p) | Al-Jaish | Baghdad |
| 14:30 UTC+03:00 | | | | Stadium: Al-Quwa Al-Jawiya Stadium; Referee: Mohsin Abdul-Karim |

| 1 November 2022 | Al-Etisalat | 4–2 | Al-Sinaat Al-Kahrabaiya | Baghdad |
| 14:30 UTC+03:00 | | | | Stadium: Al-Taji Stadium; Referee: Sajad Shaker |

| 2 November 2022 | Haifa | 1–1 (4–2 p) | Al-Difaa Al-Madani | Baghdad |
| 14:30 UTC+03:00 | | | | Stadium: Haifa Stadium; Referee: Ali Hadi Mujaiser |

| 2 November 2022 | Al-Hussein | 1–1 (2–4 p) | Al-Muroor | Baghdad |
| 14:30 UTC+03:00 | | | | Stadium: Five Thousand Stadium; Referee: Wamidh Mohammed |

Northern Section

| 1 November 2022 | Naft Al-Shamal | 1–2 | Peshmerga Sulaymaniya | Kirkuk |
| 14:30 UTC+03:00 | | | | Stadium: Naft Al-Shamal Stadium; Referee: Anas Ziyad |

| 1 November 2022 | Umal Nineveh | 0–1 | Al-Hawija | Mosul |
| 14:30 UTC+03:00 | | | | Stadium: Muntada Al-Mosul Stadium; Referee: Mohammed Taha |

| 1 November 2022 | Al-Amwaj Al-Mosuli | 3–0 (w/o) | Baban | Mosul |
| 14:30 UTC+03:00 | | | | Stadium: Al-Amwaj Al-Mosuli Stadium; Referee: Waleed Abdul-Rahman |

| 2 November 2022 | Al-Mosul | 0–1 | Ghaz Al-Shamal | Mosul |
| 14:30 UTC+03:00 | | | | Stadium: Muntada Al-Mosul Stadium; Referee: Hazar Hassan |

| 2 November 2022 | Sahl Nineveh | 1–2 | Rabia | Mosul |
| 14:30 UTC+03:00 | | | | Stadium: Dijla Stadium; Referee: Sultan Salah |

| 3 November 2022 | Baladiyat Al-Mosul | 1–0 | Al-Hadbaa | Mosul |
| 14:30 UTC+03:00 | | | | Stadium: Al-Dawasa Stadium; Referee: Ahmed Nawfil |

Southern Section

| 1 November 2022 | Al-Minaa | 3–0 | Al-Shabab Al-Basri | Basra |
| 14:30 UTC+03:00 | | | | Stadium: Al-Bahri Stadium; Referee: Mohammed Mahdi |

| 1 November 2022 | Al-Sadeq | 1–2 | Al-Nasiriya | Basra |
| 14:30 UTC+03:00 | | | | Stadium: Al-Sadeq Stadium; Referee: Ahmed Khalaf |

| 1 November 2022 | Al-Maqal | 0–0 (4–3 p) | Al-Kut | Basra |
| 14:30 UTC+03:00 | | | | Stadium: Al-Basra Stadium; Referee: Faris Mohsin |

| 2 November 2022 | Al-Maimouna | 0–1 | Al-Qurna | Maysan |
| 14:30 UTC+03:00 | | | | Stadium: Al-Maimouna Stadium; Referee: Laith Emad |

| 2 November 2022 | Al-Bahri | 1–0 | Maysan | Basra |
| 14:30 UTC+03:00 | | | | Stadium: Al-Bahri Stadium; Referee: Ahmed Faez |

Central Euphrates Section

| 1 November 2022 | Al-Samawa | 3–0 | Al-Osra | Samawa |
| 14:30 UTC+03:00 | | | | Stadium: Al-Samawa Stadium; Referee: Mohanad Manaf |

| 1 November 2022 | Al-Hurr | 2–0 | Uruk | Karbala |
| 14:30 UTC+03:00 | | | | Stadium: Al-Hurr Stadium; Referee: Amir Dhaher |

| 1 November 2022 | Al-Mahawil | 3–1 | Al-Jawhara | Al-Mahawil |
| 14:30 UTC+03:00 | | | | Stadium: Al-Mahawil Stadium; Referee: Mohammed Salah Hassoun |

| 2 November 2022 | Al-Hindiya | 1–2 | Al-Izdihar | Karbala |
| 14:30 UTC+03:00 | | | | Stadium: Karbala Secondary Stadium; Referee: Alaa Khalil |

| 2 November 2022 | Al-Meshkhab | 0–0 (4–5 p) | Al-Kufa | Najaf |
| 14:30 UTC+03:00 | | | | Stadium: Al-Najaf Secondary Stadium; Referee: Ali Haider Maksoud |

| 2 November 2022 | Jenaain Babil | 0–3 (w/o) | Al-Kifl | Hilla |
| 14:30 UTC+03:00 | | | | Stadium: Al-Iskan Stadium; Referee: Ali Maitham |

Western Section

| 1 November 2022 | Samarra | 2–1 | Balad Ruz | Samarra |
| 14:30 UTC+03:00 | | | | Stadium: Samarra Stadium; Referee: Mustafa Karim |

| 1 November 2022 | Al-Karma | 0–0 (2–4 p) | Al-Ramadi | Al-Karma |
| | | | | Stadium: Al-Karma Stadium; Referee: Ali Karim |

| 1 November 2022 | Masafi Al-Shamal | 1–1 (3–4 p) | Al-Sufiya | Salahaddin |
| | | | | Stadium: Al-Alam Stadium; Referee: Qusay Mohammed |

| 2 November 2022 | Al-Shaheed Arkan | 1–6 | Al-Jolan | Diyala |
| 14:30 UTC+03:00 | | | | Stadium: Al-Shaheed Arkan Stadium; Referee: Ayad Zahem |

| 2 November 2022 | Al-Shirqat | 3–0 (w/o) | Shahraban | Al-Shirqat |
| 14:30 UTC+03:00 | | | | Stadium: Al-Shirqat Stadium |

| 2 November 2022 | Qazaniya | 0–3 | Diyala | Diyala |
| 14:30 UTC+03:00 | | | | Stadium: Qazaniya Stadium; Referee: Haider Ali Khalid |

== Second round ==
Al-Jaish, Ghaz Al-Shamal, Rabia, Al-Minaa, Al-Bahri, Samarra, and Diyala received byes to the third round.

Baghdad Section

| 6 November 2022 | Masafi Al-Wasat | 2–1 | Al-Tijara | Baghdad |
| 14:30 UTC+03:00 | | | | Stadium: Al-Masafi Stadium; Referee: Haider Ali Khalid |

| 6 November 2022 | Amanat Baghdad | 1–0 | Al-Etisalat | Baghdad |
| 14:30 UTC+03:00 | | | | Stadium: Amanat Baghdad Stadium; Referee: Ammar Abdul Kadhim |

| 6 November 2022 | Al-Muroor | 0–1 | Haifa | Baghdad |
| 14:30 UTC+03:00 | | | | Stadium: Five Thousand Stadium; Referee: Alaa Mohammed |

Northern Section

| 6 November 2022 | Peshmerga Sulaymaniya | 4–0 | Al-Amwaj Al-Mosuli | Sulaymaniya |
| 14:30 UTC+03:00 | | | | Stadium: Farmanda Stadium; Referee: Waleed Abdul Rahman |

| 7 November 2022 | Al-Hawija | 2–0 | Baladiyat Al-Mosul | Kirkuk |
| 14:30 UTC+03:00 | | | | Stadium: Al-Hawija Stadium; Referee: Wamidh Mahmoud |

Southern Section

| 6 November 2022 | Al-Nasiriya | 0–1 | Masafi Al-Junoob | Dhi Qar |
| 14:30 UTC+03:00 | | | | Stadium: Al-Shatra Stadium; Referee: Laith Emad |

| 6 November 2022 | Al-Qurna | 2–1 | Al-Maqal | Basra |
| 14:30 UTC+03:00 | | | | Stadium: Al-Qurna Stadium; Referee: Ali Ahmed Shaker |

Central Euphrates Section

| 5 November 2022 | Al-Hurr | 3–3 (4–2 p) | Al-Mahawil | Karbala |
| 14:30 UTC+03:00 | | | | Stadium: Al-Hurr Stadium; Referee: Sameh Rahi |

| 5 November 2022 | Al-Samawa | 4–0 | Al-Ghadhriya | Muthanna |
| 14:30 UTC+03:00 | | | | Stadium: Al-Samawa Stadium; Referee: Munir Habib |

| 6 November 2022 | Al-Izdihar | 2–2 (4–3 p) | Al-Kufa | Najaf |
| 14:30 UTC+03:00 | | | | Stadium: Muntada Al-Hurriya Stadium; Referee: Ali Maitham |

| 6 November 2022 | Al-Kifl | 3–5 | Afak | Babil |
| 14:30 UTC+03:00 | | | | Stadium: Al-Kifl Stadium; Referee: Mohammed Fadous |

Western Section

| 6 November 2022 | Al-Sufiya | 0–0 (4–5 p) | Al-Ramadi | Al-Anbar |
| 14:30 UTC+03:00 | | | | Stadium: Al-Sufiya Stadium; Referee: Mohammed Sadeq |

| 6 November 2022 | Al-Shirqat | 1–0 | Al-Jolan | Salahaddin |
| 14:30 UTC+03:00 | | | | Stadium: Al-Shirqat Stadium; Referee: Jamal Abdul Ridha |

== Third round ==
Baghdad Section

| 10 November 2022 | Amanat Baghdad | 2–0 | Masafi Al-Wasat | Baghdad |
| 14:15 UTC+03:00 | | | | Stadium: Amanat Baghdad Stadium; Referee: Feed Karim |

| 10 November 2022 | Al-Jaish | 0–0 (2–4 p) | Haifa | Baghdad |
| 14:15 UTC+03:00 | | | | Stadium: Al-Jaish Stadium; Referee: Mustafa Karim Salem |

Northern Section

| 11 November 2022 | Ghaz Al-Shamal | 1–1 (5–4 p) | Peshmerga Sulaymaniya | Kirkuk |
| 14:15 UTC+03:00 | | | | Stadium: Ghaz Al-Shamal Stadium; Referee: Ayad Zahem |

| 11 November 2022 | Rabia | 1–1 (2–4 p) | Al-Hawija | Mosul |
| 14:15 UTC+03:00 | | | | Stadium: Muntada Al-Mosul Stadium; Referee: Diyar Shihab |

Southern Section

| 11 November 2022 | Al-Bahri | 2–0 | Al-Qurna | Basra |
| 14:15 UTC+03:00 | | | | Stadium: Al-Bahri Stadium; Referee: Faris Mohsin |

| 12 November 2022 | Masafi Al-Junoob | 2–1 | Al-Minaa | Basra |
| 14:15 UTC+03:00 | | | | Stadium: Al-Bahri Stadium; Referee: Khalid Karim |

Central Euphrates Section

| 10 November 2022 | Al-Hurr | 0–0 (2–4 p) | Al-Samawa | Karbala |
| 14:15 UTC+03:00 | | | | Stadium: Al-Hurr Stadium; Referee: Amjad Kamil |

| 10 November 2022 | Afak | 2–1 | Al-Izdihar | Al-Qadisiya |
| 14:15 UTC+03:00 | | | | Stadium: Afak Stadium; Referee: Mohammed Riyadh |

Western Section

| 11 November 2022 | Al-Ramadi | 1–0 | Samarra | Al-Anbar |
| 14:15 UTC+03:00 | | | | Stadium: Al-Ramadi Stadium; Referee: Laith Farhan |

| 11 November 2022 | Diyala | 1–2 | Al-Shirqat | Diyala |
| 14:15 UTC+03:00 | | | | Stadium: Diyala Stadium; Referee: Ali Hadi Salih |

=== Third round play-off ===
Baghdad Section

| 14 November 2022 | Masafi Al-Wasat | 1–0 | Al-Jaish | Baghdad |
| 14:15 UTC+03:00 | | | | Stadium: Al-Masafi Stadium; Referee: Ahmed Jumaa Habib |

Central Euphrates Section

| 15 November 2022 | Al-Izdihar | 0–0 (2–4 p) | Al-Hurr | Najaf |
| 14:15 UTC+03:00 | | | | Stadium: Muntada Al-Hurriya Stadium; Referee: Amjad Kamil |

== Final phase ==
=== Bracket ===
Round of 32; 6–25 March 2023
Zakho | 0
Al-Zawraa | 1
Naft Al-Basra | 1
Afak | 0
Al-Hurr | 0
Al-Quwa Al-Jawiya | 2
Al-Shorta | 6
Masafi Al-Junoob | 3
Al-Qasim | 1 (8)
Duhok (p) | 1 (9)
Al-Talaba | 2
Al-Diwaniya | 1
Al-Najaf | 1 (2)
Amanat Baghdad (p) | 1 (4)
Al-Karkh (p) | 0 (5)
Al-Kahrabaa | 0 (4)
Newroz | 1
Naft Maysan | 2
Karbala | 1
Al-Sinaa | 0
Al-Hudood (w/o) | 3
Al-Hawija | 0
Al-Shirqat | 2
Ghaz Al-Shamal | 1
Al-Samawa | 1 (5)
Erbil (p) | 1 (6)
Naft Al-Wasat | 2
Haifa | 0
Al-Ramadi | 0 (2)
Al-Bahri (p) | 0 (4)
Masafi Al-Wasat | 1
Al-Naft | 0

Round of 16; 13 April 2023 – 16 May 2023
Al-Zawraa (p) | 1 (4)
Naft Al-Basra | 1 (2)
Al-Quwa Al-Jawiya (p) | 1 (7)
Al-Shorta | 1 (6)
Duhok | 0
Al-Talaba | 1
Amanat Baghdad | 1 (8)
Al-Karkh (p) | 1 (9)
Naft Maysan | 2
Karbala | 1
Al-Hudood | 2
Al-Shirqat | 1
Erbil | 2
Naft Al-Wasat | 1
Al-Bahri (p) | 3 (8)
Masafi Al-Wasat | 3 (7)

Quarter-finals; 25–26 July 2023
Al-Zawraa | 1 (2)
Al-Quwa Al-Jawiya (p) | 1 (3)
Al-Talaba | 0 (4)
Al-Karkh (p) | 0 (5)
Naft Maysan | 0 (3)
Al-Hudood (p) | 0 (5)
Erbil (w/o) | 3
Al-Bahri | 0

Semi-finals; 31 July 2023 – 1 August 2023
Al-Quwa Al-Jawiya | 3
Al-Karkh | 1
Al-Hudood | 0
Erbil | 1

Final; 5 August 2023
Al-Quwa Al-Jawiya | 1
Erbil | 0

== Round of 32 ==
20 top-tier teams and 12 lower-tier teams competed in this round.

| 6 March 2023 | Al-Hurr | 0–2 | Al-Quwa Al-Jawiya | Karbala |
| 15:00 UTC+03:00 | | | Akakpo 57'; Raed 74' | Stadium: Karbala International Stadium; Referee: Mohanad Manaf |

| 6 March 2023 | Al-Ramadi | 0–0 (2–4 p) | Al-Bahri | Ramadi |
| 15:00 UTC+03:00 | | | | Stadium: Al-Ramadi Stadium; Referee: Mohammed Kamel Zughair |

| 6 March 2023 | Al-Karkh | 0–0 (5–4 p) | Al-Kahrabaa | Baghdad |
| 15:00 UTC+03:00 | | | | Stadium: Al-Saher Ahmed Radhi Stadium; Referee: Wathik Mohammed |

| 6 March 2023 | Al-Talaba | 2–1 | Al-Diwaniya | Baghdad |
| 15:00 UTC+03:00 | Salam 89'; Jawad 90+4' | | Al-Dardour 51' | Stadium: Al-Shaab Stadium; Referee: Salem Amer |

| 6 March 2023 | Naft Al-Wasat | 2–0 | Haifa | Najaf |
| 15:00 UTC+03:00 | Esquerdinha 30'; Lafta 75' | | | Stadium: Al-Najaf International Stadium; Referee: Mohammed Salah |

| 7 March 2023 | Al-Hudood | 3–0 (w/o) | Al-Hawija | Baghdad |
| 14:30 UTC+03:00 | | | | Stadium: Al-Shaab Stadium; Referee: Hussein Abed Ali |

| 7 March 2023 | Al-Samawa | 1–1 (5–6 p) | Erbil | Samawa |
| 15:00 UTC+03:00 | | | | Stadium: Al-Samawa Stadium; Referee: Ali Hussein Ali |

| 7 March 2023 | Al-Shirqat | 2–1 | Ghaz Al-Shamal | Al-Shirqat |
| 15:00 UTC+03:00 | | | | Stadium: Al-Shirqat Stadium; Referee: Awmid Mustafa |

| 7 March 2023 | Masafi Al-Wasat | 1–0 | Al-Naft | Baghdad |
| 15:00 UTC+03:00 | | | | Stadium: Al-Masafi Stadium; Referee: Essam Fadhel |

| 7 March 2023 | Newroz | 1–2 | Naft Maysan | Erbil |
| 15:00 UTC+03:00 | Maradona 80' | | Abed 49'; Okoronkwo 75' | Stadium: Franso Hariri Stadium; Referee: Yousif Saeed Hasan |

| 7 March 2023 | Naft Al-Basra | 1–0 | Afak | Basra |
| 15:00 UTC+03:00 | Abdul-Raheem 43' | | | Stadium: Al-Fayhaa Stadium; Referee: Sajad Khalid |

| 7 March 2023 | Zakho | 0–1 | Al-Zawraa | Zakho |
| 15:00 UTC+03:00 | | | Abdulkareem 35' | Stadium: Zakho International Stadium; Referee: Mohanad Qasim Sarray |

| 7 March 2023 | Al-Najaf | 1–1 (2–4 p) | Amanat Baghdad | Najaf |
| 15:00 UTC+03:00 | | | | Stadium: Al-Najaf International Stadium; Referee: Ali Sabah |

| 7 March 2023 | Al-Shorta | 6–3 | Masafi Al-Junoob | Baghdad |
| 18:15 UTC+03:00 | Husni 12', 54'; Amer 15' (o.g.); Benyamin 19' (o.g.); Moumouni 39'; Al-Mawas 77' | | Qasim 24'; Michael 71' (pen.); Suroor 79' | Stadium: Al-Shaab Stadium; Referee: Ahmed Kadhim |

| 24 March 2023 | Karbala | 1–0 | Al-Sinaa | Karbala |
| 15:00 UTC+03:00 | Fadhil 66' | | | Stadium: Karbala International Stadium |

| 25 March 2023 | Al-Qasim | 1–1 (8–9 p) | Duhok | Karbala |
| 15:00 UTC+03:00 | | | | Stadium: Karbala International Stadium |

== Round of 16 ==
12 top-tier teams and 4 lower-tier teams competed in this round.

| 13 April 2023 | Amanat Baghdad | 1–1 (8–9 p) | Al-Karkh | Baghdad |
| 15:15 UTC+03:00 | Jacob 27' | | Talla 33' | Stadium: Amanat Baghdad Stadium; Referee: Mohanad Manaf |

| 13 April 2023 | Naft Maysan | 2–1 | Karbala | Amara |
| 21:30 UTC+03:00 | Matar 51'; Okoronkwo 55' | | Raad 19' | Stadium: Maysan Olympic Stadium; Referee: Mohammed Kamel Zughair |

| 14 April 2023 | Al-Bahri | 3–3 (8–7 p) | Masafi Al-Wasat | Basra |
| 15:15 UTC+03:00 | | | | Stadium: Al-Bahri Stadium; Referee: Mohammed Salah |

| 14 April 2023 | Erbil | 2–1 | Naft Al-Wasat | Erbil |
| 21:30 UTC+03:00 | Radhi | | Esquerdinha | Stadium: Franso Hariri Stadium; Referee: Ayad Zahem |

| 14 April 2023 | Al-Zawraa | 1–1 (4–2 p) | Naft Al-Basra | Baghdad |
| 21:30 UTC+03:00 | El Ani 3' | | Ngombé 53' | Stadium: Al-Shaab Stadium; Referee: Mohammed Salman |
| | Penalties |
| | El Ani (penalty scored); Mohammed (penalty scored); Abdullah (penalty scored); Abdulkareem (penalty scored) | | (penalty scored) Calixto; (penalty scored) Abdul-Raheem; (penalty missed) Ahmed; (penalty missed) Zamel |

| 14 April 2023 | Duhok | 0–1 | Al-Talaba | Duhok |
| 21:30 UTC+03:00 | | | Jaílson 54' | Stadium: Duhok Stadium; Referee: Yousif Saeed Hasan |

| 15 May 2023 | Al-Hudood | 2–1 | Al-Shirqat | Baghdad |
| 17:00 UTC+03:00 | Yeboah 8'; Sabah 52' | | Hamad 57' | Stadium: Al-Shaab Stadium; Referee: Ali Ahmed Shaker |

| 16 May 2023 | Al-Quwa Al-Jawiya | 1–1 (7–6 p) | Al-Shorta | Baghdad |
| 20:00 UTC+03:00 | Abdul-Kadhim 14' | | Farhan 59' | Stadium: Al-Shaab Stadium; Referee: Ahmed Kadhim |
| | Penalties |
| | Abdul-Raheem (penalty scored); Abdul-Kadhim (penalty scored); Mohsin (penalty scored); Acquah (penalty scored); Maaroufi (penalty scored); Hanoon (penalty scored); Akakpo (penalty scored) | | (penalty scored) Rostam; (penalty scored) Haddad; (penalty scored) Dawood; (penalty scored) Niang; (penalty scored) Al-Youssef; (penalty scored) Farhan; (penalty missed) Yahya |

== Quarter-finals ==
7 top-tier teams and 1 lower-tier team compete in this round.

| 25 July 2023 | Naft Maysan | 0–0 (3–5 p) | Al-Hudood | Amara |
| 19:00 UTC+03:00 | | | | Stadium: Maysan Olympic Stadium |

| 25 July 2023 | Al-Zawraa | 1–1 (2–3 p) | Al-Quwa Al-Jawiya | Baghdad |
| 21:00 UTC+03:00 | Qasim 83' | | Al-Baqir 87' | Stadium: Al-Shaab Stadium; Referee: Yousif Saeed Hasan |
| | Penalties |
| | El Ani (penalty missed); Abdul-Amir (penalty scored); Abdullah (penalty missed); Abbas (penalty scored); Abdulkareem (penalty missed) | | (penalty missed) Abdul-Raheem; (penalty scored) Abdul-Kadhim; (penalty scored) Bayesh; (penalty scored) Atchou; (penalty missed) Mohsin |

| 26 July 2023 | Erbil | 3–0 (w/o) | Al-Bahri | Erbil |
| 19:30 UTC+03:00 | | | | Stadium: Franso Hariri Stadium |

| 26 July 2023 | Al-Talaba | 0–0 (4–5 p) | Al-Karkh | Baghdad |
| 20:00 UTC+03:00 | | | | Stadium: Al-Shaab Stadium; Referee: Zaid Thamer Mohammed |
| | Penalties |
| | Ismail (penalty scored); Tahseen (penalty missed); Jawad (penalty scored); Abdullah (penalty scored); Ali (penalty missed); Camara (penalty scored); Hussein (penalty missed) | | (penalty scored) Nouri; (penalty missed) Caio; (penalty scored) Shallon; (penalty missed) Abdul-Rahman; (penalty scored) Hmeisha; (penalty scored) dos Santos; (penalty scored) Waleed |

== Semi-finals ==
All remaining teams are from the top-tier.

| 31 July 2023 | Al-Hudood | 0–1 | Erbil | Baghdad |
| 20:00 UTC+03:00 | | | Khalil 52' | Stadium: Al-Shaab Stadium |

| 1 August 2023 | Al-Quwa Al-Jawiya | 3–1 | Al-Karkh | Baghdad |
| 20:00 UTC+03:00 | Abdul-Raheem 34'; Jabbar 45+2'; Abdul-Kadhim 90+2' | | Hanoon 58' (o.g.) | Stadium: Al-Shaab Stadium |

== Final ==
5 August 2023
20:00 UTC+03:00

| Al-Quwa Al-Jawiya | 1–0 | Erbil |
|---|---|---|
| Abdul-Raheem 29' |

Al-Shaab Stadium, Baghdad
Referee: Zaid Thamer Mohammed

Iraq FA Cup
2022–23 winner
Al-Quwa Al-Jawiya
6th title
