= 2025–26 Iraq FA Cup =

Tournament details
- Country: Iraq
- Teams: 42

Final positions
- Champions: N/A (tournament cancelled)

Tournament statistics
- Matches played: 26
- Goals scored: 50 (1.92 per match)

The 2025–26 Iraq FA Cup was the 36th edition of the Iraqi knockout football cup as a club competition, the main domestic cup in Iraqi football. 42 clubs from the top three tiers of the Iraqi football league system were set to participate in the competition.

The tournament began on 17 October 2025 with the first round, which was played between the ten lowest-placed clubs from the Iraq Stars League, all 20 clubs from the Iraqi Premier Division League and the two highest-placed clubs from the Iraqi First Division League based on league positions in the 2024–25 season. The next four highest-placed clubs from the Iraq Stars League entered the competition in the second round.

The top six Iraq Stars League clubs were set to receive a bye to the Round of 16, and the draw for the Round of 16 was held on 18 May 2026. However, the tournament was cancelled only nine days later, as the schedule clashed with the Iraq national team's participation at the 2026 FIFA World Cup as well as the Iraq Olympic team's training camp in Turkey.

== Schedule ==
The rounds of the 2025–26 competition were scheduled as follows:

Round	Draw date	Match dates
First round	9 October 2025	17–19 October 2025
Second round	2 November 2025	7–13 November 2025
Round of 16	18 May 2026	5 June 2026
Quarter-finals	18 May 2026	8 June 2026
Semi-finals	18 May 2026	14 June 2026
Final	18 May 2026	18 June 2026

== First round ==
This round features 10 teams from the Stars League (level 1), 20 teams from the Premier Division League (level 2) and 2 teams from the First Division League (level 3). Duhok, Al-Karma, Newroz and Al-Qasim received byes to the second round.

17 October 2025	Al-Kadhimiya (2)	0–1	Ghaz Al-Shamal (2)	Baghdad
15:00 UTC+3				Stadium: Al-Kadhimiya Stadium

17 October 2025	Masafi Al-Wasat (2)	0–0 (5–4 p)	Al-Najaf (1)	Baghdad
15:00 UTC+3				Stadium: Al-Masafi Stadium

17 October 2025	Naft Al-Basra (2)	1–1 (6–5 p)	Al-Fahad (2)	Basra
15:00 UTC+3				Stadium: Basra Tertiary Stadium

17 October 2025	Al-Hussein (2)	1–1 (5–4 p)	Afak (2)	Baghdad
15:00 UTC+3				Stadium: Five Thousand Stadium

17 October 2025	Al-Kahrabaa (1)	0–0 (3–4 p)	Al-Hashd Al-Shaabi (2)	Baghdad
15:00 UTC+3				Stadium: Amanat Baghdad Stadium

17 October 2025	Al-Gharraf (1)	0–1	Naft Maysan (1)	Nasiriya
18:00 UTC+3				Stadium: Al-Nasiriya International Stadium

17 October 2025	Al-Minaa (1)	2–1	Naft Al-Wasat (2)	Basra
18:00 UTC+3				Stadium: Al-Minaa Olympic Stadium

17 October 2025	Al-Mosul (1)	2–1	Diyala (1)	Duhok
18:00 UTC+3				Stadium: Duhok Stadium

18 October 2025	Al-Ramadi (2)	1–0	Al-Jolan (2)	Al-Anbar
15:00 UTC+3				Stadium: Al-Sufiya Stadium

18 October 2025	Al-Jaish (2)	1–2	Erbil (1)	Baghdad
15:00 UTC+3				Stadium: Al-Jaish Stadium

18 October 2025	Al-Bahri (2)	1–0	Maysan (2)	Basra
15:00 UTC+3				Stadium: Basra International Stadium

18 October 2025	Al-Hudood (2)	3–1	Peshmerga Sulaymaniya (2)	Baghdad
15:00 UTC+3				Stadium: Amanat Baghdad Stadium

18 October 2025	Al-Sinaat Al-Kahrabaiya (3)	0–3 (w/o)	Karbala (2)	Baghdad
15:00 UTC+3				Stadium: Al-Taji Stadium

18 October 2025	Amanat Baghdad (1)	2–2 (5–4 p)	Masafi Al-Junoob (2)	Baghdad
18:00 UTC+3				Stadium: Al-Saher Ahmed Radhi Stadium

18 October 2025	Al-Nasiriya (2)	1–1 (4–2 p)	Al-Etisalat (2)	Nasiriya
18:00 UTC+3				Stadium: Al-Nasiriya International Stadium

19 October 2025	Al-Karkh (1)	3–0 (w/o)	Al-Sinaa (3)	Baghdad
15:00 UTC+3				Stadium: Al-Saher Ahmed Radhi Stadium

== Second round ==
This round features 10 teams from the Stars League (level 1) and 10 teams from the Premier Division League (level 2). Al-Shorta, Al-Zawraa, Zakho, Al-Talaba, Al-Quwa Al-Jawiya and Al-Naft received byes to the Round of 16.

7 November 2025	Al-Ramadi (2)	1–1 (1–2 p)	Al-Karma (1)	Ramadi
15:00 UTC+3				Stadium: Al-Ramadi Stadium

7 November 2025	Naft Maysan (1)	3–0	Naft Al-Basra (2)	Nasiriya
15:00 UTC+3				Stadium: Al-Nasiriya International Stadium

7 November 2025	Masafi Al-Wasat (2)	1–1 (4–5 p)	Al-Minaa (1)	Baghdad
15:00 UTC+3				Stadium: Al-Masafi Stadium

7 November 2025	Al-Mosul (1)	1–1 (3–5 p)	Al-Hashd Al-Shaabi (2)	Duhok
19:30 UTC+3				Stadium: Duhok Stadium

7 November 2025	Al-Nasiriya (2)	0–1	Erbil (1)	Nasiriya
19:30 UTC+3				Stadium: Al-Nasiriya International Stadium

8 November 2025	Ghaz Al-Shamal (2)	0–0 (3–4 p)	Al-Qasim (1)	Kirkuk
15:00 UTC+3				Stadium: Ghaz Al-Shamal Stadium

8 November 2025	Karbala (2)	2–0	Amanat Baghdad (1)	Karbala
15:00 UTC+3				Stadium: Karbala Secondary Stadium

8 November 2025	Duhok (1)	1–0	Al-Hussein (2)	Duhok
18:00 UTC+3				Stadium: Duhok Stadium

8 November 2025	Newroz (1)	0–0 (2–4 p)	Al-Bahri (2)	Sulaymaniya
18:00 UTC+3				Stadium: Newroz Stadium

13 November 2025	Al-Hudood (2)	1–3	Al-Karkh (1)	Baghdad
15:00 UTC+3				Stadium: Amanat Baghdad Stadium

== Final phase ==
The Iraq Football Association announced the cancellation of the tournament on 27 May 2026, nine days after the draw was held for the Round of 16.

=== Bracket ===
Round of 16
Al-Shorta
Al-Bahri
Al-Karma
Al-Hashd Al-Shaabi
Al-Talaba
Al-Karkh
Al-Qasim
Al-Naft
Naft Maysan
Al-Zawraa
Duhok
Erbil
Al-Minaa
Zakho
Al-Quwa Al-Jawiya
Karbala

Quarter-finals

Semi-finals

Final
