= 2017–18 Iraqi First Division League =

Iraqi First Division League
- Season: 2017–18
- Champions: Al-Karkh (2nd title)
- Promoted: Al-Karkh; Erbil

The 2017–18 Iraqi First Division League. Al-Karkh and Erbil secured the two promotion spots for the 2018–19 Iraqi Premier League, with Al-Karkh being the champions due to having more points than Erbil in the final stage. The final round started on 8 August 2018 and finished on 20 August 2018.

== Format ==
Teams from all over Iraq participated in preliminary qualifications for the final stage, which consisted of 12 teams split into two groups. The winners of the two groups would be promoted.

== Final stage ==
=== Group 1 ===
All matches played in Erbil.

| Pos | Team | Pld | W | D | L | GF | GA | GD | Pts | Promotion |
|---|---|---|---|---|---|---|---|---|---|---|
| 1 | Erbil (P) | 5 | 3 | 2 | 0 | 11 | 3 | +8 | 11 | Promoted to Iraqi Premier League |
| 2 | Al-Qasim | 5 | 3 | 1 | 1 | 6 | 4 | +2 | 10 | |
| 3 | Al-Difaa Al-Madani | 5 | 2 | 2 | 1 | 3 | 5 | −2 | 8 | |
| 4 | Al-Sulaikh | 5 | 2 | 0 | 3 | 5 | 4 | +1 | 6 | |
| 5 | Al-Mosul | 5 | 0 | 3 | 2 | 5 | 7 | −2 | 3 | |
| 6 | Maysan | 5 | 0 | 2 | 3 | 1 | 8 | −7 | 2 | |

Source: Goalzz.com
Rules for classification: 1) points; 2) goal difference; 3) number of goals scored.
(P) Promoted

==== Results ====
| Home \ Away | DIF | MOS | QAS | SUL | ERB | MSN |
|---|---|---|---|---|---|---|
| Al-Difaa Al-Madani | — | 1–1 | — | — | — | 0–0 |
| Al-Mosul | — | — | 1–2 | — | 2–2 | — |
| Al-Qasim | 0–1 | — | — | 1–0 | 1–1 | — |
| Al-Sulaikh | 0–1 | 2–1 | — | — | 0–1 | — |
| Erbil | 4–0 | — | — | — | — | 3–0 (Note: The Erbil–Maysan match was awarded as a 3–0 win to Erbil after Maysan players walked off the field in protest at refereeing decisions.) |
| Maysan | — | 0–0 | 1–2 | 0–3 (Note: The Maysan–Al-Sulaikh match was awarded as a 3–0 win to Al-Sulaikh after Maysan failed to turn up for the game.) | — | — |

Source: Goalzz.com
Legend: Blue = home team win; Yellow = draw; Red = away team win.
For upcoming matches, an "a" indicates there is an article about the rivalry between the two participants.

=== Group 2 ===
All matches played in Karkh.

| Pos | Team | Pld | W | D | L | GF | GA | GD | Pts | Promotion |
|---|---|---|---|---|---|---|---|---|---|---|
| 1 | Al-Karkh (C, P) | 5 | 5 | 0 | 0 | 9 | 1 | +8 | 15 | Promoted to Iraqi Premier League |
| 2 | Al-Sinaa | 5 | 3 | 0 | 2 | 13 | 6 | +7 | 9 | |
| 3 | Afak | 5 | 2 | 1 | 2 | 3 | 5 | −2 | 7 | |
| 4 | Brayati | 5 | 2 | 0 | 3 | 4 | 6 | −2 | 6 | |
| 5 | Al-Nasiriya | 5 | 1 | 2 | 2 | 8 | 9 | −1 | 5 | |
| 6 | Al-Ramadi | 5 | 0 | 1 | 4 | 5 | 15 | −10 | 1 | |

Source: Goalzz.com
Rules for classification: 1) points; 2) goal difference; 3) number of goals scored.
(C) Champions; (P) Promoted

==== Results ====
| Home \ Away | AFK | KAR | NAS | RAM | SIN | BRA |
|---|---|---|---|---|---|---|
| Afak | — | 0–1 | — | 1–0 | 0–3 | — |
| Al-Karkh | — | — | — | — | 1–0 | 2–0 |
| Al-Nasiriya | 1–1 | 1–2 | — | 2–2 | — | — |
| Al-Ramadi | — | 0–3 (Note: The Al-Ramadi–Al-Karkh match was awarded as a 3–0 win to Al-Karkh after Al-Ramadi failed to turn up for the game.) | — | — | — | 0–3 |
| Al-Sinaa | — | — | 4–1 | 6–3 | — | — |
| Brayati | 0–1 | — | 0–3 | — | 1–0 | — |

Source: Goalzz.com
Legend: Blue = home team win; Yellow = draw; Red = away team win.
For upcoming matches, an "a" indicates there is an article about the rivalry between the two participants.

== Others ==
- 2017–18 Iraqi Premier League
- 2017 Iraqi Super Cup
