= 2015–16 Iraqi First Division League =

Iraqi First Division League
- Season: 2015–16
- Champions: Al-Hussein (1st title)
- Promoted: Al-Hussein; Al-Bahri

The 2015–16 Iraqi First Division League. Al-Hussein ended as champions of the division for the first time in their history, and Al-Bahri were runners-up on the goals scored rule. Both teams were promoted to the 2016–17 Iraqi Premier League.

== Format ==
League consists of four different stages. The first stage ended in April and the second stage ended in May; both of these rounds consisted of multiple group stages that were based on geographical position. 12 teams qualified for the Elite Stage. The Elite Stage started on June 6 and ended on June 14; it consisted of three groups of four, with the three group winners and the best runner-up reaching the Golden Stage (which starts on 13 July and ends on 19 July). The two top teams in the Golden Stage are promoted to the 2016–17 Iraqi Premier League and the top team is the Iraqi First Division League champion.

== Elite stage ==
=== North & West Group ===
Pos	Team	Pld	W	D	L	GF	GA	GD	Pts	Qualification	BRA	GHA	DIY	SAL
1	Brayati (A)	3	2	1	0	8	2	+6	7	Advance to Golden Stage	—	3–0	0–0	
2	Ghaz Al-Shamal	3	1	1	1	6	5	+1	4			—	2–2	4–0
3	Diyala	3	0	3	0	3	3	0	3				—	1–1
4	Salahaddin	3	0	1	2	5	12	−7	1		2–5			—

Source: Goalzz.com
Rules for classification: 1) Points, 2) Goal difference, 3) Goals scored
(A) Advance to a further round
- The match between Brayati and Ghaz Al-Shamal ended 1–1 but the result was later changed to a 3–0 win for Brayati after Ghaz Al-Shamal were found guilty of playing ineligible player Uday Shehab.

=== Baghdad Group ===
Pos	Team	Pld	W	D	L	GF	GA	GD	Pts	Qualification	HUS	SIN	KHU	JAI
1	Al-Hussein (A)	3	2	0	1	7	3	+4	6	Advance to Golden Stage	—	0–2	1–0	
2	Al-Sinaat Al-Kahrabaiya (A)	3	2	0	1	5	3	+2	6	Advance to Golden Stage		—	1–2	2–1
3	Al-Khutoot	3	2	0	1	3	2	+1	6				—	1–0
4	Al-Jaish	3	0	0	3	2	9	−7	0		1–6			—

Source: Goalzz.com
Rules for classification: 1) Points, 2) Goal difference, 3) Goals scored
(A) Advance to a further round

=== Middle Euphrates Group ===
Pos	Team	Pld	W	D	L	GF	GA	GD	Pts	Qualification	BAH	QAS	DIW	MAY
1	Al-Bahri (A)	3	2	1	0	4	2	+2	7	Advance to Golden Stage	—	0–0	2–1	
2	Al-Qasim	3	1	1	1	3	3	0	4			—	2–1	1–2
3	Al-Diwaniya	3	1	0	2	5	4	+1	3				—	3–0
4	Maysan	3	1	0	2	3	6	−3	3		1–2			—

Source: Goalzz.com
Rules for classification: 1) Points, 2) Goal difference, 3) Goals scored
(A) Advance to a further round

== Golden stage ==
Pos	Team	Pld	W	D	L	GF	GA	GD	Pts	Promotion	HUS	BAH	BRA	SIN
1	Al-Hussein (C, Q)	3	1	2	0	2	1	+1	5	Promotion to the Iraqi Premier League	—	0–0		1–0
2	Al-Bahri (Q)	3	0	3	0	3	3	0	3	Promotion to the Iraqi Premier League		—		2–2
3	Brayati	3	0	3	0	1	1	0	3		1–1	0–0	—	
4	Al-Sinaat Al-Kahrabaiya	3	0	2	1	3	4	−1	2				1–1	—

Source: Goalzz.com
Rules for classification: 1) Points, 2) Goal difference, 3) Goals scored
(C) Champions; (Q) Qualified for the phase indicated

== Others ==
- 2015–16 Iraqi Premier League
- 2015–16 Iraq FA Cup
