= Essam Yassin =

Iraqi football player (born 1987)

Personal information
- Full name: Essam Yassin Abbas
- Date of birth: 11 March 1987 (age 39)
- Place of birth: Iraq
- Height: 1.80 m (5 ft 11 in)
- Position: Centre-back

Team information
- Current team: Al-Hudood

Senior career*
Years	Team	Apps	(Gls)
2004–2005	Al-Kahraba		
2005–2007	Al-Horriya		
2007–2008	Sulaymaniyah		
2008	Duhok		
2008–2009	Al-Amana		
2009	Erbil		
2009–2010	Baghdad		
2010–2011	Duhok		
2011–2012	Baghdad		
2012–2014	Zakho		
2014–2016	Naft Al-Wasat		
2016–2017	Al-Shorta		
2017–2018	Al-Naft		
2018–2019	Najaf		
2019–2020	Naft Al-Wasat		
2020–2021	Zakho		
2021–	Al-Hudood		

International career
2009	Iraq	3	(0)
- * Club domestic league appearances and goals

Essam Yassin Abbas (Arabic: عصام ياسين عباس) (born March 11, 1987, in Iraq) is an Iraqi football player, who currently plays for Al-Shorta SC in Iraq.

== Style of play ==
Essam was a complete and dominant defender who was influential at club. His technical, defensive, and athletic abilities made him a versatile player tactically, allowing him to be deployed as a fullback or even as a sweeper.

== Honours ==
=== Club ===
Naft Al-Wasat

- Iraqi Premier League: 2014–15

Al-Hudood

- Iraqi First Division League: 2021–22
