= Franco Atchou =

Togolese international football player

Personal information
- Full name: Koffi Franco Atchou
- Date of birth: 3 December 1995 (age 30)
- Place of birth: Hedjegan, Togo
- Height: 1.83 m (6 ft 0 in)
- Position: Midfielder

Team information
- Current team: Al-Quwa Al-Jawiya
- Number: 13

Senior career*
Years	Team	Apps	(Gls)
2015–2017	Dyto		
2017–2018	Enyimba	3	(0)
2018–2021	Fremad Amager	71	(1)
2021–2022	Erbil SC	0	(0)
2022-	Al-Quwa Al-Jawiya		

International career^{‡}
2014–	Togo under-20	4	(0)
2017–	Togo	20	(1)
- * Club domestic league appearances and goals as of 18:35, 29 June 2021 (UTC) ‡ National team caps and goals as of 14 October 2019

Franco Atchou is a Togolese professional footballer who plays as a midfielder for Al-Quwa Al-Jawiya.

Atchou played for the Togo under-20 side in the 2015 Orange African U-20 Cup of Nations in all 4 of their qualifying games against Morocco and Mali in 2014.

He played for Togo on 4 October 2016 in a friendly against Uganda. He had previously represented Togo in qualifying tournament for the 2016 African Nations Championship.

== International career ==
=== International goals ===
Scores and results list Togo's goal tally first.

No.	Date	Venue	Opponent	Score	Result	Competition
1.	13 October 2019	Stade Marcel Roustan, Salon-de-Provence, France	Equatorial Guinea	1–1	1–1	Friendly

== Honours ==
Al-Quwa Al-Jawiya

- Iraq FA Cup: 2022–23
