= Afak Stadium =

Stadium in Iraq

Afak Stadium ملعب عفك
- Interactive map of Afak Stadium ملعب عفك
- Full name: Afak Stadium
- Location: Al Diwaniyah, Iraq
- Coordinates: 32.0610°N 45.2430°E
- Owner: Ministry of Youth and Sports (Iraq)
- Capacity: 5,000
- Surface: Artificial turf
- Scoreboard: Yes
- Field size: 105 m × 68 m

Construction
- Opened: 27 May 2016

Tenants
- Afak FC; Al-Diwaniya FC

Afak Stadium (Arabic: ملعب عفك) is a multi-use stadium in Al Diwaniyah, Iraq. It is currently used mostly for football matches and serves as the home stadium of Afak FC and Al-Diwaniya FC. The stadium holds 5,000 people.

The stadium was inaugurated on 27 May 2016 with a football game between Al Diwaniyah's local team and Iraqi league stars' team which ended 2–2. All benefits from the entrance tickets were given to the poorest families of the city and also to the families whose members sacrificed themselves to protect their homeland during the last Iraq war.

== See also ==
- List of football stadiums in Iraq
