= Ittifaq =

Ittifaq or Ittifak may refer to:

- Ittifaq al-Muslimin, a political party of Muslims in the Russian Empire
- Ittifaq Party, a nationalist political party in Tatarstan
- İttifaQ, the Tatar hip-hop group
- Al-Ittifaq FC, Emirati football club
- Al-Ettifaq FC, Saudi football club
- Al-Ettifaq SC (Iraq), Iraqi football club
