= Ruslan Hanoon =

Iraqi footballer

Personal information
- Date of birth: 4 March 1996 (age 30)
- Position: Defender

Team information
- Current team: Al-Quwa Al-Jawiya
- Number: 2

Youth career
- 2012–2014: Al-Kahrabaa

Senior career*
Years	Team	Apps	(Gls)
2014–2019	Naft Maysan		
2019–2023	Naft Al-Wasat		
2023–	Al-Quwa Al-Jawiya	81	(2)

International career^{‡}
2014	Iraq U20		
2018	Iraq U23		
2022–	Iraq	1	(0)
- * Club domestic league appearances and goals as of 21/5/24 @ 16:26(AEST) ‡ National team caps and goals as of 24 March 2022

Ruslan Hanoon (Arabic: رُسْلَان حَنُّون; born 4 March 1996) is an Iraqi footballer who plays as a defender for Al-Quwa Al-Jawiya in the Iraqi Premier League.

== International career ==
On 24 March 2022, Hanoon made his first international cap with Iraq against United Arab Emirates in a World Cup qualifier.

== Honours ==
Al-Quwa Al-Jawiya

- Iraq Stars League: 2025–26
- Iraq FA Cup: 2022–23
