= Uday Shehab =

Iraqi footballer

Personal information
- Date of birth: 14 June 1997 (age 29)
- Position: Defender

Team information
- Current team: Al-Shorta

Senior career*
Years	Team	Apps	(Gls)
2012–2014	Al-Mosul		
2014–2016	Karah		
2016	Ghaz Al-Shamal		
2016–2017	Zakho		
2017–2021	Al-Karkh		
2021–	Al-Shorta	3	(0)

International career
2017	Iraq U23		
2019–	Iraq	1	(0)
- * Club domestic league appearances and goals

Uday Shehab Ahmad (Arabic: عدي شهاب احمد; born 14 June 1997) is an Iraqi footballer who plays as a defender for Al-Shorta in the Iraqi Premier League.

== Club career ==
Shehab started his career with Al-Mosul in the 2011–12 Iraqi Elite League, scoring his first goal as a 15-year old against Samaraa on 29 July 2012. After footballing activity in Mosul stopped due to ISIS, Shehab moved to Karah to compete in the Kurdistan League. He joined Ghaz Al-Shamal in 2016 to compete in the 2015–16 Iraqi First Division League Elite Stage, however after playing in a match against Brayati his transfer to Ghaz Al-Shamal was deemed illegitimate due to the transfer window having ended and therefore Ghaz Al-Shamal were awarded a 3–0 loss for the match and Shehab was not allowed to play for them anymore. He joined Zakho before moving to Al-Karkh in the winter transfer window of the 2016–17 season and was called up to the Iraq Olympic team in March 2017.

== International career ==
On 7 June 2019, Shehab made his first international cap with Iraq against Tunisia in an international friendly.
