= Adel Khudhair =

Iraqi footballer and coach

Personal information
- Full name: Adel Khodhor Hafedh
- Date of birth: 1 July 1954 (age 72)
- Place of birth: Basra, Iraq
- Positions: Defender; midfielder

Team information
- Current team: Al-Hawija SC

Youth career
- 1970–1972: Al-Mina'a

Senior career*
Years	Team	Apps	(Gls)
1972–1974	Al-Mina'a		
1974–1976	Al-Jaish		
1976–1982	Al-Zawraa		
1982–1984	Al-Shabab		

International career
1975–1982	Iraq	69	(4)

Managerial career
- 1994: Maysan
- 2003: Karbalaa
- 2003–2004: Al-Malkiya
- 2004–2005: Al-Tadhamun
- 2005–2006: Al-Etifaq
- 2008–2009: East Riffa
- 2009–2010: Al-Malkiya
- 2021-: Al-Hawija SC
- * Club domestic league appearances and goals

Adel Khodhor Hafedh Al-Musawi (Arabic: عادل خضيّر; born 1 July 1954, better known as Adel Khudhair, is an Iraqi football coach and former international player. He played as a defender and midfielder. He was born in Basra.

== International posts ==
Khudhair appeared at the World Military Cup 1977, and also played in the Moscow Olympics in 1980. He played in 5th Arabian Gulf Cup in 1979 and scored two goals, the first goal against Emirates, and the second against Oman.

== Political aspect ==
In 1982, the Iraqi Ba'athist government overthrew Khudhair out the national team after they learned that his brother (Shaker) belonged to the Dawa party. His brother was then assassinated with his son (Mahmoud) by the government and Khudhair was subsequently placed under house arrest.

After the outbreak of the 1991 uprising in Basra, Khudhair took part in a military operation and was seriously injured. He was taken to Kuwait, then to Iran and treated in hospital. And then returned to join the Iraqi opposition front through Patriotic Union of Kurdistan until the 2003 invasion of Iraq.

== Coaching career ==
Since 2003, Khudhair has been a professional coach in Bahrain, where he has trained many Bahraini clubs and achieved excellent results with them, including Al-Malkiya, Al-Tadhamun, Al-Etifaq and East Riffa Club. Khudhair was named coach of Al-Hawija Sc in the summer of 2021 and led the team to a successful 2021/2022 season by gaining promotion to the Iraqi First Division League for the 2022/2023 season.

== International goals ==
Scores and results table. Iraq's goal tally first:

Adel Khudhair: International goals
No.	Date	Venue	Opponent	Score	Result	Competition
1	4 April 1979	Al-Shaab Stadium, Baghdad, Iraq	United Arab Emirates	5–0	5–0	5th Arabian Gulf Cup
2	6 April 1979	Al-Shaab Stadium, Baghdad, Iraq	Oman	6–0	7–0	5th Arabian Gulf Cup
3	28 March 1980	Al-Shaab Stadium, Baghdad, Iraq	South Yemen	3–0	3–0	1980 Olympics qualifiers
4	30 March 1981	Prince Faisal bin Fahd Stadium, Riyadh, Saudi Arabia	Syria	2–1	2–1	1982 FIFA World Cup qualification
5	24 August 1981	Al-Shaab Stadium, Baghdad, Iraq	Guinea	2–2	2–2	International Friendly
6	16 September 1981	KLFA Stadium, Kuala Lumpur, Malaysia	Thailand	7–1	7–1	1981 Pestabola Merdeka

== Honors ==
=== Local ===
Al-Zawraa

- Iraqi Premier League: 1977, 1979.
- Iraq FA Cup: 1979, 1981, 1982.

=== International ===
Iraq

- 1977 World Men's Military Cup: Champion
- 1979 Arabian Gulf Cup: Champion
