= Al-Izdihar SC =

Iraqi football club

- Full name: Al-Izdihar Sport Club
- Founded: 2004; 21 years ago
- Ground: Al-Izdihar Stadium
- Chairman: Fadhel Mahdi Al-Zamili
- Manager: Haider Abbas
- League: Iraqi Third Division League
Home colours	Away colours

Al-Izdihar Sport Club (Arabic: نادي الازدهار الرياضي), is an Iraqi football team based in Al-Najaf, that plays in the Iraqi Third Division League.

== Managerial history ==
- (Iraq) Emad Salman
- (Iraq) Hasanain Khudhair
- (Iraq) Haider Abbas

== See also ==
- 2020–21 Iraq FA Cup
