= Al-Jinsiya SC =

Iraqi football club

- Full name: Al-Jinsiya Sport Club
- Founded: 2014
- Dissolved: 2023
- Ground: Al-Jinsiya Stadium
- Final season; 2022–23: Iraqi First Division League, 12th in Group 1 (relegated)
Home colours	Away colours

Al-Jinsiya Sport Club (Arabic: نادي الجنسية الرياضي) was an Iraqi football team based in Baghdad, that played in Iraqi First Division League.

The club was dissolved by the Ministry of Interior in 2023.

== Managerial history ==
- (Iraq) Karim Qumbil
- (Iraq) Hadi Mtanesh
- (Iraq) Haider Jumaa
- (Iraq) Ahmed Daham
- (Iraq) Ahmed Sabri
- (Iraq) Muthana Khalid

== See also ==
- 2021–22 Iraq FA Cup
- 2022–23 Iraq FA Cup
