= 1977 World Men's Military Cup =

Tournament details
- Host country: Syria
- City: Damascus
- Dates: 23 June - 3 July
- Teams: 8
- Venue(s): 1 (in 1 host city)

Final positions
- Champions: Iraq (4th title)
- Runners-up: Kuwait
- Third place: Italy
- Fourth place: France

Tournament statistics
- Matches played: 16
- Goals scored: 38 (2.38 per match)

The 1977 World Military Championship was a football tournament which took place in Damascus, capital of Syria.

== Qualification ==
=== Qualification stage ===
==== Group 1 ====
Played between Iran, West Germany and Saudi Arabia

- West Germany qualified for the final tournament

==== Group 2 ====
18 February 1976

France	5 − 0	Morocco

..., Vire

3 March 1976

France	2 − 1	Algeria

..., Châteauroux

28 April 1976

Netherlands	1 − 1	France

..., Leerdam

18 May 1976

Algeria	0 − 1	France

Stade 19 Juin 1965, Oran

19 May 1976

Netherlands	3 − 1	Morocco

Sportpark Olympia, Waalwijk

22 December 1976

Netherlands	0 − 0	Algeria

NAC Stadion, Breda

26 January 1977

France	3 − 0	Netherlands

..., Châteauroux

16 March 1977

Morocco	2 − 0	France

Stade Moulay Abdellah, Rabat

18 May 1977

Algeria	1 − 0	Netherlands

..., Algiers

Morocco	? − ?	Netherlands

Algeria	? − ?	Morocco

Morocco	? − ?	Algeria

- France qualified for the final tournament

==== Group 3 ====
12 February 1976

Greece	3 − 0	Sudan

Georgios Karaiskakis Stadium, Piraeus

18 March 1976

Italy	2 − 1	Greece

Stadio Libero Liberati, Terni

13 May 1976

Sudan	1 − 1	Greece

..., Khartoum

24 November 1976

Greece	2 − 2	Italy

Kaftanzoglio Stadium, Thessaloniki

Italy	? − ?	Sudan

Sudan	? − ?	Italy

- Egypt withdrew
- Italy qualified for the final tournament

==== Group 4 ====
Played between Cameroon, Ghana, Senegal and Zaire

- Cameroon qualified for the final tournament

==== Group 5 ====
Played between Nigeria, Gabon, Congo and Ivory Coast

- Nigeria qualified for the final tournament

==== Group 6 ====
15 December 1976

Belgium	1 − 2	Kuwait

Joseph Marien Stadium, Brussels

13 January 1977

Kuwait	0 − 0	Belgium

..., Kuwait City
- Jordan withdrew(?)
- Kuwait qualified for the final tournament

==== Group 7 ====
Played between Iraq, Bahrain, North Yemen and United Arab Emirates

- Iraq qualified for the final tournament

=== Qualified teams ===
- Syria - qualified as host
- West Germany
- France
- Italy
- Iraq
- Kuwait
- Cameroon
- Nigeria

== Final tournament ==
=== Group stage ===
==== Group A ====
Team	Pld	W	D	L	GF	GA	GD	Pts
Iraq	3	3	0	0	6	2	+4	6
France	3	1	1	1	8	5	+1	3
Nigeria	3	0	2	1	1	2	−1	2
West Germany	3	0	1	2	0	5	−5	1

Iraq	1 − 0	France

..., Damascus

Nigeria	0 − 0	West Germany

..., Damascus

Iraq	1 − 0	Nigeria

..., Damascus

France	6 − 2	West Germany

..., Damascus

Iraq	4 − 2	West Germany

..., Damascus

France	2 − 2	Nigeria

..., Damascus

==== Group B ====
Team	Pld	W	D	L	GF	GA	GD	Pts
Kuwait	3	3	0	0	4	1	+3	6
Italy	3	1	1	1	6	1	+5	3
Syria	3	1	1	1	3	2	+1	3
Cameroon	3	0	0	3	0	9	−9	0

Kuwait	1 − 0	Italy

..., Damascus

Syria	2 − 0	Cameroon

..., Damascus

Kuwait	2 − 1	Syria

..., Damascus

Italy	6 − 0	Cameroon

..., Damascus

Kuwait	1 − 0	Cameroon

..., Damascus

Italy	0 − 0	Syria

..., Damascus

=== Knockout stage ===
==== 7th-place match ====
West Germany	3 − 2	Cameroon

..., Damascus

==== 5th-place match ====
Syria	1 − 0	Nigeria

..., Damascus

==== 3rd-place match ====
Italy	3 − 1 aet	France

..., Damascus

==== Final ====
July 3, 1977

Iraq	0 − 0 5 − 4 pen	Kuwait

..., Damascus

=== Champion ===
1977 World Military Cup winners

Iraq
Second title
