= Sadia Olivier Bleu =

Ivorian footballer (born 1997)

Sadia Olivier
Personal information
- Full name: Sadia Olivier Bleu
- Date of birth: 26 December 1997 (age 28)
- Place of birth: Bangolo, Ivory Coast
- Height: 1.72 m (5 ft 7 1/2 in)
- Position: Midfielder

Team information
- Current team: Amanat Baghdad
- Number: 7

Youth career
- 2015–2016: Selafe Treichville Academy

Senior career*
Years	Team	Apps	(Gls)
2017–2019	Selafe Treichville	0	(0)
2019–2020	Ghazl Mahalla	12	(1)
2021–present	Amanat Baghdad	1	(0)
- * Club domestic league appearances and goals as of 30 May 2021

Sadia Olivier Bleu (born 26 December 1997), known as Sadia Olivier, is an Ivorian professional footballer who plays as a midfielder for Iraqi Premier League club Amanat Baghdad.

== Club career ==
=== Early career ===
Sadia was born in Bangolo, Ivory Coast. He started playing at a very young age and he joined Salef Academy in Ivory Coast and also made his debut for senior team at the age of 18.

=== Ghazl Mahalla ===
In August 2019, Sadia signed with Egyptian second division club Ghazl El Mahalla. It was a successful season for both Sadia and his team, they top the group and gained qualification to Egyptian Premier League for the season 2020–21.

=== Amanat Baghdad ===
In January 2021, Sadia signed with Iraqi Premier League club Amanat Baghdad SC.

== Honors ==
Ghazl Mahalla

- Egyptian Second Division:

(gold) Winners : 2019–20
