= Al-Muroor SC =

Iraqi football club

- Full name: Al-Muroor Sport Club
- Founded: 2018
- Dissolved: 2023
- Ground: Al-Muroor Stadium
- Final season; 2022–23: Iraqi First Division League, 5th in Group 2
Home colours	Away colours

Al-Muroor Sport Club (Arabic: نادي المرور الرياضي), was an Iraqi football team based in Sadr City, Baghdad, that played in Iraqi First Division League.

The club was dissolved by the Ministry of Interior in 2023.

== Managerial history ==
- (Iraq) Adel Ajar
- (Iraq) Haider Karim
- (Iraq) Hazim Salih
- (Iraq) Taiseer Abdul-Hussein
- (Iraq) Rashid Sultan

== See also ==
- 2021–22 Iraq FA Cup
- 2022–23 Iraq FA Cup
