= Donatus Edafe =

Nigerian footballer

Personal information
- Full name: Donatus Iwezuife Edafe
- Date of birth: 3 November 1993 (age 33)
- Place of birth: Nigeria
- Height: 1.76 m (5 ft 9 in)
- Position: Forward

Team information
- Current team: Al-Sinaa

Youth career
- Jigawa Golden Stars F.C.

Senior career*
Years	Team	Apps	(Gls)
-2017	Mighty Jets		
2017–2018	Gorica	23	(5)
2018–2019	Minerva Punjab	5	(0)
2020-2022	Cihangir	14	(9)
2022–2023	Karbala	19	(8)
2023–2024	Ghaz Al-Shamal	12	(5)
2024–	Al-Sinaa	15	(7)
- * Club domestic league appearances and goals

Donatus Iwezuife Edafe (born 3 November 1993) is a Nigerian professional footballer who plays as a forward or midfielder for Iraqi First Division club Al-Sinaa SC.

== Career ==
=== Early career ===
After coming through the ranks of Nigeria National League club Jigawa Golden Stars, Edafe joined fellow Nigerian National League side Mighty Jets. He departed Mighty Jets on 18 February 2017 to join then Prva Liga side Gorica.

=== Fall out in Slovenia ===
Despite getting off to a good start with Gorica on 5 May 2018, Edafe was supposedly released from his contract with the Prva Liga side due to allegations of gross misconduct by the Gorica president, as he, according to several news outlets, accused Edafe of impregnating his daughter. However, this later turned out to be a hoax, as the president did not have a daughter. According to Edafe, he terminated his own contract, due to not getting the agreed amount of playing time that he was promised when he signed his contract with Gorica. After a short spell as a free agent, he joined then Indian Football League side Minerva Punjab and appeared in five games for the club, ultimately scoring no goals.

=== After Gorica ===
On 25 January 2020, Edafe joined KTFF Süper Lig club Cihangir, spending the next two years with the Cypriot side.

=== Present day ===
After leaving Cihangir, Edafe bounced around several smaller, semi-professional football clubs before he joined Iraqi Premier Division side Karbala on a free transfer, where he spent the next year. On 25 September 2023, joined fellow Iraqi Premier Division side Ghaz Al-Shamal, also on a free transfer. On 27 August 2024, he left Ghaz Al-Shamal to join Iraqi First Division outfit Al-Sinaa for an undisclosed fee.
