= Al-Hawija SC =

Iraqi football club

- Full name: Al-Hawija Sport Club
- Founded: 1991; 35 years ago
- Ground: Al-Hawija Stadium
- Chairman: Ali Eidan Jalil
- Manager: Mohammed Shathar
- League: Iraqi Second Division League
Home colours	Away colours

Al-Hawija Sport Club (Arabic: نادي الحويجة الرياضي), is an Iraqi football team based in Hawija District, Kirkuk, that plays in the Iraqi Second Division League.

== After ISIS era ==
After the end of the era of ISIS control over Hawija, and the return of life to its people, the sports activity of the club returned, after its closure, and a new football team was formed, which participated in the 2020–21 Iraq FA Cup, and also participated in the league qualifiers for the 2020–21 Iraqi First Division League.

== Rivalries ==
The Al-Hawija SC–Daquq SC rivalry is a rivalry between Kirkuk-based association football clubs Al-Hawija and Daquq. Both clubs are currently playing in the Iraqi First Division League.

== Managerial history ==
- (Iraq) Ali Hantash
- (Iraq) Adel Khudhair
- (Iraq) Ali Abboud
- (Iraq) Mohammed Shathar

== See also ==
- 2020–21 Iraq FA Cup
