= Masafi Al-Junoob SC =

Iraqi football club

- Full name: Masafi Al-Junoob Sport Club
- Founded: 2005; 21 years ago
- Ground: Masafi Al-Junoob Stadium
- Owner: Ministry of Oil
- Chairman: Adnan Hussein Saeber
- Manager: Sattar Jabbar
- League: Iraqi Premier Division League
- 2025–26: Iraqi Premier Division League, 14th of 20
Home colours	Away colours

Masafi Al-Junoob Sport Club (Arabic: نادي مصافي الجنوب الرياضي), is an Iraqi football team based in Al-Shaibah, Basra, that plays in Iraqi Premier Division League.

== History ==
=== in Premier League ===
Masafi Al-Junoob played in the Iraqi Premier League in 2009–10 season, but relegated to the Iraqi First Division League after finished the season in 18th place in the Group Stage.

== Managerial history ==
- (Iraq) Hussein Hamad
- (Iraq) Asaad Abdul-Razzaq
- (Iraq) Nasser Talla Dahilan
- (Iraq) Abdul-Yemma Warwar
- (Iraq) Sattar Jabbar

== See also ==
- 2021–22 Iraq FA Cup
- 2022–23 Iraq FA Cup

== Other games ==
=== Beach soccer ===
Masafi Al-Junoob beach soccer team won the 2016–17 Iraqi Beach Soccer League title, and transferred trophy of the championship to Basra for the first time.
