= Brayati SC =

Iraqi football club

- Full name: Brayati Sport club
- Founded: 1984; 42 years ago
- Ground: Brayati Stadium
- Capacity: 5000
- Chairman: Bashdar Sarbast
- Manager: Mahmoud Majeed
- League: Iraqi Third Division League
Home colours	Third colours

Brayati Sport club (Arabic: نادي برايتي), is an Iraqi sport club based in Erbil, Iraq that plays in the Iraqi Third Division League, the fifth-tier of Iraqi football. The club is also known as Yaney Brayati. The name Brayati is a Kurdish term meaning “Brotherhood”.

== Kits and crest ==
Since its establishment Brayati football club has been mainly using green home kits (with white trimmings) and white away kits (with green trimmings) which remain the club's main colours to this day.

Brayati football club's logo is also made green and white, with images of the historic and world famous Erbil Citadel and also the Mudhafaria Minare

== Players ==
Note: Flags indicate national team as defined under FIFA eligibility rules; some limited exceptions apply. Players may hold more than one non-FIFA nationality.

No.	Pos.	Nation	Player
1	GK	IRQ	Hawraman Rizgar
99	DF	IRQ	Niyaz Mohammed
4	DF	IRQ	Kirmanj Qadr
3	DF	IRQ	Darya Omar
5	DF	IRQ	Suwd Farqi
6	DF	IRQ	Bamo Gharib
9	MF	IRQ	Halgurd Mulla Mohammed
8	MF	IRQ	Rebwar Najmadin
87	FW	IRQ	Dilshad Hamarsh
10	MF	IRQ	Arkan Rahim
12	FW	IRQ	Arkan Amir
13	MF	IRQ	Hameed Ismail
15	DF	IRQ	Diyar Yakhi
17	DF	IRQ	Omar Omar

No.	Pos.	Nation	Player
18	MF	IRQ	Abdulla Khalil
19	MF	IRQ	Hozan Jamil
20	DF	IRQ	Humam Tariq
21	MF	IRQ	Botan Daham
23	GK	IRQ	Rawand Ajil
25	MF	IRQ	Soran Aziz
30	GK	IRQ	Sartip Habin
31	DF	IRQ	Wirya Kamaran
70	DF	IRQ	Hiwa Jalal
77	FW	IRQ	Gaylab Luqman
2	FW	IRQ	Zhyar Govand
88	MF	IRQ	Hargurd Qais Jaafer
99	MF	IRQ	Balen Wyshar

== Honours ==
=== Domestic ===
==== Regional ====
- Kurdistan Premier League
  - Winners (1): 2020–21

== Famous Head Coaches ==
- (Iraq) Yousef Kaki
- (Iraq) Adel Khudhair
