= Al-Difaa Al-Madani SC =

Iraqi football club

- Full name: Al-Difaa Al-Madani Sport Club
- Founded: 2005
- Dissolved: 2023
- Ground: Al-Aaras Stadium
- Owner: Ministry of Interior
- Final season; 2022–23: Iraqi First Division League, 10th in Group 1
Home colours	Away colours

Al-Difaa Al-Madani Sport Club (Arabic: نادي الدفاع المدني الرياضي, lit. 'Civil Defense SC'), was an Iraqi football team based in Al-Shaab, Baghdad, that played in the Iraqi First Division League and Iraq FA Cup.

The club was dissolved by the Ministry of Interior in 2023.

== History ==
Al-Difaa Al-Madani Sport Club was founded in 2005 by Ministry of Interior. The club didn't have a headquarters until 2017, when they rehabilitated one of the war shelters to turn it into a club headquarters, they played in the Iraq FA Cup in 2015–16 season, the team played their first match against Al-Mahmoudiyah FC and beat him, but they were in the 32nd round facing Al-Zawraa, the league champions that season and lost the match. The club played in Iraqi First Division League in 2017–18 season and almost qualified for Iraqi Premier League in 2018 season, but in the final stage finished behind Erbil, the Iraqi champions for three seasons in the last ten years and Erbil is qualified.

== Personnel ==
=== Board members ===
Position	Name	Nationality
President:	Adel Al-Hurr Lazim	(Iraq)
Vice-president:	Jabbar Mohsin	(Iraq)
Secretary:	Akram Wali	(Iraq)
Treasurer:	Basheer Abdul Sada	(Iraq)
Member of the Board:	Vacant	(Iraq)

Updated to match played 14 December 2017
Source: newsabah.com

== Managerial history ==
- (Iraq) Haider Jabbar
- (Iraq) Mahdi Kadhim
- (Iraq) Adel Ajar
- (Iraq) Kadhim Yousef

== See also ==
- 2015–16 Iraq FA Cup
- 2016–17 Iraq FA Cup
