= Kirkuk Olympic Stadium =

Iraqi football stadium

Kirkuk Olympic Stadium ملعب كركوك الأولمبي یاریگای ئۆڵۆمپیی کەرکووک
- Interactive map of Kirkuk Olympic Stadium ملعب كركوك الأولمبي یاریگای ئۆڵۆمپیی کەرکووک
- Location: Kirkuk, Iraq
- Coordinates: 35.443164°N 44.421308°E
- Owner: Government of Iraq
- Capacity: 25,000
- Surface: Grass
- Scoreboard: Yes
- Field size: 105 m × 68 m

Construction
- Built: 1982

Tenant
- Kirkuk FC

Kirkuk Olympic Stadium (Arabic: ملعب كركوك الأولمبي) (Kurdish: یاریگای ئۆڵۆمپی کەرکووک) is a multi-use stadium in Kirkuk, Iraq. It is currently used mostly for football matches and it also has an athletics track. The stadium holds 25,000.

The stadium was built in 1982 for an Olympics that never happened.

The stadium refurbishment is being done in two phases. First the stadium is being comprehensively rebuilt. Phase two will augment the facilities.

After the fall of the Saddam Hussein regime in 2003, at least 500 Kurds who had been displaced returned to Kirkuk and settled in the stadium. The families lived in the stadium for more than six years before moving on.

Subsequently, the stadium underwent renovations costing approximately 20 billion Iraqi dinars (around 11.7 million euros) and was expanded to include a hotel and two training grounds, among other additions. The construction works were funded by the Iraqi Ministry of Youth and Sports. The project began in 2011, with the initial completion date set for 2015. In January 2020, the budget for the project was increased to 33.5 billion dinars (approximately 25.2 million euros). As of mid 2026, Al-Shafaq reported the project is still underway.

== See also ==
- List of football stadiums in Iraq
