= Al-Masafi Stadium =

Stadium in Baghdad, Iraq

- ملعب المصافي
- Interactive map of Al-Masafi Stadium
- Location: Baghdad, Iraq
- Coordinates: 33°16′13.7″N 44°25′41.7″E
- Capacity: 5,000

Tenant
- Masafi Al-Wasat

Al-Masafi Stadium (Arabic: ملعب المصافي) is a multi-use stadium in Baghdad, Iraq. It is currently used mostly for football matches and serves as the home stadium of Al-Masafi. The stadium holds 5,000 people.

== See also ==
- List of football stadiums in Iraq
