= Al-Bahri Stadium =

Stadium in Iraq

Al-Bahri Stadium ملعب البحري
- ملعب نادي البحري
- Interactive map of Al-Bahri Stadium ملعب البحري
- Location: Basra, Iraq
- Coordinates: 30°33′02.7″N 47°48′11.8″E
- Owner: Ministry of Defence
- Operator: Al-Bahri SC
- Capacity: 7,000
- Surface: Grass
- Field size: 105 by 68 metres (114.8 yd × 74.4 yd)

Construction
- Built: 2015–2022
- Opened: 16 March 2022
- Cost: 3 billion IQD

Tenant
- Al-Bahri SC

Al-Bahri Stadium (Arabic: ملعب البحري) is a football specific stadium in Basra, Iraq. It is the new home of Al-Bahri SC, currently playing in the Iraqi First Division League. The stadium has a capacity of 7,000 spectators, fully seated and all sheltered.

== Notable events ==
The stadium was inaugurated on 16 March 2022, with a friendly match between Al-Bahri SC and Al-Mina'a SC. It ended with a 1–1 draw.

== See also ==
- List of football stadiums in Iraq
