= Al-Shirqat SC =

Iraqi football club

- Full name: Al-Shirqat Sports Club
- Founded: 1992; 33 years ago
- Ground: Al-Shirqat Stadium
- President: Dhamir Abdul Razzaq
- Manager: Farhan Hamad
- League: Iraqi First Division League
- 2024–25: Iraqi First Division League, 4th of 20
Home colours	Away colours

Al-Shirqat Sports Club (Arabic: نادي الشرقاط الرياضي) is an Iraqi football team based in Al-Shirqat, Saladin, that plays in Iraqi First Division League.

== History ==
=== Early years ===
Al-Shirqat Club was founded on May 5, 1992 and played in the Fourth Division League in 1993 for two seasons. Then the team qualified to the Third Division League in 1995 and played in it until 1999. They were promoted to the Second Division League in 1999 and to the First Division League in 2007 when they won the Second Division League with Al-Dour SC from Saladin Governorate.

=== In Premier League ===
Al-Shirqat team played in the Iraqi Premier League for the first time in the 2009–10 season, and played in the Northern Group, and the team was not good enough, and eventually relegated to the Iraqi First Division League. After one season, the team returned to play again in the Premier League, after winning the Iraqi First Division League championship, but its results in the league were not good. At the end of the 2011–12 season, they finished in penultimate place and were relegated to the Iraqi First Division League.

== Managerial history ==
- (Iraq) Adel Khudhair
- (Iraq) Karim Saddam
- (Iraq) Mohammed Attiya
- (Iraq) Farhan Hamad

== Honours ==
- Iraqi Premier Division League (second tier)
  - Winners (1): 2010–11
