= Al-Alam SC =

Iraqi football club

- Full name: Al-Alam Sport Club
- Founded: 1997; 29 years ago
- Ground: Al-Alam Stadium
- Chairman: Jawad Najem Al-Joburi
- Manager: Amin Abbas
- League: Iraqi First Division League
Home colours	Away colours

Al-Alam Sport Club (Arabic: نادي العلم الرياضي) is an Iraqi football team based in Saladin, that plays in Iraqi First Division League.

== Managerial history ==
- (Iraq) Ali Jawad
- (Iraq) Adnan Mohammed
- (Iraq) Abdullah Al-Taiyawi
- (Iraq) Natiq Haddad
- (Iraq) Amin Abbas

== See also ==
- 2019–20 Iraq FA Cup
- 2021–22 Iraq FA Cup
