= Al-Nasiriya International Stadium =

Stadium in Iraq

- ملعب الناصرية الدولي
- Interactive map of Al-Nasiriya International Stadium
- Location: Nasiriyah, Iraq
- Coordinates: 31.0218765°N 46.2508193°E
- Owner: Ministry of Youth and Sports
- Capacity: 20,000
- Surface: Grass

Construction
- Groundbreaking: March 2013
- Opened: 20 August 2024
- Cost: $ 95 million USD
- Structural engineer: GEG – Engineering Structures for Life
- Services engineer: Eiffage
- General contractor: Egis
- Main contractors: Sarl Ur D'Architecture & Urbanisme

Tenants
- Al-Nasiriya FC; Al-Gharraf SC

Al-Nasiriya International Stadium (Arabic: ملعب الناصرية الدولي), also known as Dhi Qar Sports Complex, is a football stadium in Nasiriyah, Iraq. It primarily serves as the new home stadium of Al-Nasiriya FC. The stadium has a capacity of 20,000 spectators. The net construction cost is estimated around 95 million USD funded entirely by Iraqi government.

== Overview ==
In 2013, the Iraqi government presented the project for a new stadium in Dhi Qar, in the south of the country, with a design signed by the French architecture firm of Bechu & Associés in collaboration with Alain-Charles Perrot. The project includes a main stadium with a capacity of 30,000 spectators, two training stadiums seating 2,500 and 500 people respectively, a four-star hotel with 80 rooms and two sports pavilions (aquatic center and sports hall).

The project that started in 2013 was supposed to be delivered in two and a half years, but seven years later, only 75% of the stadium was complete.

In January 2022, faced with the delays, the Iraqi government decided to terminate all contracts with the French companies in charge of the work.

On 20 August 2024, Iraqi prime minister Mohammed Shia' Al Sudani inaugurated the stadium with a final capacity of 20,000. The main feature of the venue was its walls which contained inscriptions and symbols that reflect the heritage of the Sumerian civilization.

== See also ==
- List of football stadiums in Iraq
- Football in Iraq
