= Afak SC =

Iraqi football club

Afak
- Full name: Afak Sports Club
- Founded: 1991; 35 years ago
- Ground: Afak Stadium
- Capacity: 5,000
- Chairman: Mahmoud Karim
- Manager: Hussein Mohie
- League: Iraqi First Division League
- 2025–26: Iraqi Premier Division League, 20th of 20 (relegated)
Home colours	Away colours

Afak Sports Club (Arabic: نادي عفك), is an Iraqi football club based in Afak, Al-Qādisiyyah. The team competes in the Iraqi First Division League.

== History ==
Afak Club was established in 1991 by some athletes in Al Diwaniyah Governorate, and after reaching the Iraqi First Division League, it participated seven times in the final rounds of qualifying for the Premier League, but did not qualify. In the 2020–21 season, the team managed to reach the third-place match after playing 13 matches without losing, but they lost in the match to determine the third place against Samarra 1-0, from a penalty kick, and for the eighth time, they were close to qualifying, without qualifying to play in the Premier League.

== Stadium ==
On May 31, 2016, Afak Stadium was opened in the presence of sports and government figures. The stadium accommodate 5,000 spectators.

== Managerial history ==
- (Iraq) Haider Hussein
- (Iraq) Saeed Mohsen
- (Iraq) Haider Abbas
- (Iraq) Hussein Mohie
