= Al Kifl Stadium =

Stadium in Iraq

- ملعب الكفل الاولمبي
- Interactive map of Al Kifl Stadium
- Full name: Al Kifl Olympic Stadium
- Location: Babylon, Iraq
- Coordinates: 32°14′04.3″N 44°23′24.5″E
- Owner: Ministry of Youth and Sports (Iraq)
- Capacity: 8,000
- Surface: Artificial turf
- Scoreboard: Yes
- Field size: 105 m × 68 m

Construction
- Built: 2016-2018
- Opened: 1 May 2018

Tenant
- Al-Qasim SC

Al Kifl Stadium (Arabic: ملعب الكفل الاولمبي) is a multi-use stadium in Babylon, Iraq. It is currently used mostly for football matches and serves as the home stadium of Al-Qasim SC. It also has facilities for athletics which offers the possibility to host various sporting events. It is named after the town Al Kifl in which the stadium is located. The stadium holds 8,000 people.

The opening ceremony of the stadium took place on 1 May 2018 in a cheerful and festive atmosphere characterized by choreographed shows, songs and musical concerts in front of stands filled with a great audience. It was concluded by a friendly match between Al-Qasim SC and Al-Kifl SC who won the match 2–1.

Anecdotally, former Iraqi national football team legend Younis Mahmoud was guest of honor and kicked off the inaugural game ball.

== See also ==
- List of football stadiums in Iraq
