= Shaibah =

Shaibah الشعيبة
- Location within Iraq
- Coordinates: 30°24′N 47°38′E
- Country: Iraq
- Governorate: Basrah
- Districts: Al-Zubair

Shaibah (Arabic: الشعيبة) is the name of a small village and a site of a military airfield near Az Zubayr, 7 miles (11 km) south west of Basrah in Iraq. The area was the site of a battle with Turkish Forces during the Mesopotamian campaign of the First World War.

It was the site of RAF Shaibah from 1920 until 1956 when it was then handed over to the Iraqi Air Force.

3rd Indian Motor Brigade was reformed as 43rd Lorried Infantry Brigade here in December 1942 – February 1943 during the Second World War.

It was the site of Multi-National Division (South East)/Coalition Forces' Shaibah Logistics Base (SLB) during the invasion and occupation of Iraq from 2003 until 2007. While in operation it was home to British, Czech, Danish and Norwegian forces. In 2007 the SLB was handed over to Iraqi Army.

== See also ==
- List of former Royal Air Force stations
- Article 5, Anglo-Iraqi Treaty (1930)
- USS Stark incident
