= Five Thousand Stadium =

Football stadium in Baghdad, Iraq

Five Thousand Stadium ملعب الخمسة آلاف متفرج
- ملعب نادي الحسين
- Interactive map of Five Thousand Stadium ملعب الخمسة آلاف متفرج
- Location: Sadr City, Baghdad, Iraq
- Coordinates: 33°23′43.3″N 44°27′39.7″E
- Owner: Ministry of Youth and Sports
- Capacity: 5,000
- Surface: Grass
- Field size: 105 by 68 metres (114.8 yd × 74.4 yd)

Tenant
- Al-Hussein SC

Five Thousand Stadium (Arabic: ملعب الخمسة آلاف متفرج), also known as Al-Hussein Stadium, is a football-specific stadium in Baghdad, Iraq. It is currently used mostly for football matches and is the home stadium of Al-Hussein SC. As the stadium's name implies, it can hold 5,000 spectators.

== See also ==
- List of football stadiums in Iraq
