= Peshmerga Sulaymaniya SC =

Iraqi football club

Peshmergae Sulaymani SC
- Full name: Sulaymani Peshmarga Sport Club
- Founded: 1999; 27 years ago
- Ground: Peshmarga stadium
- Chairman: Jaafar Al-Sheikh Mustafa
- Manager: Ammar Hussein
- League: Iraqi Premier Division League
- 2025–26: Iraqi Premier Division League, 13th of 20
Home colours	Away colours

Sulaymani Peshmarga Sport Club (Arabic: نادي بيشمركة الرياضي; Kurdish: یانه‌ی وه‌رزشی پێشمه‌رگه‌ی سلێمانی) is a sports club based in Sulaymaniyah, Kurdistan Region, Iraq. They currently play in the Iraqi Premier Division League. The club was founded in 1999.

== History ==
=== First Division League champions ===
Peshmarga team played in the Iraqi First Division League season 2009–10, and managed to top its group and be promoted to play in the Premier League. The top team in each group played in the final match to determine the league champion, where Peshmarga and Al-Jaish met at Al-Karkh Stadium in Baghdad, and Peshmarga was able to defeat Al-Jaish with a score (3–0) and win the championship.

=== in Premier League ===
Peshmarga team played in the Premier League for the first time in the 2010–11 season, and played in the Northern Group, and the team was not good enough, and despite the change of coach, the team continued to lose its matches, and eventually relegated to the Iraqi First Division League.

== Rivalries ==
Peshmerga fans consider their main rivals to be Sulaymaniya.

== Current squad ==
=== First-team squad ===
As of 30 May 2024

Note: Flags indicate national team as defined under FIFA eligibility rules; some limited exceptions apply. Players may hold more than one non-FIFA nationality.

No.	Pos.	Nation	Player
2	DF	IRQ	Ali Hussein
3	DF	NGA	Kingsley Obumneme
7	FW	IRQ	Hussein Najm
8	MF	GHA	Yakubu Wadudu

No.	Pos.	Nation	Player
10	MF	IRQ	Niaz Maghded
11	FW	GHA	Mohammed Abass
18	FW	GHA	Stephen Sarfo
25	DF	GHA	Justice Anane

== Honours ==
- Iraqi Premier Division League (second tier)
  - Winners (1): 2009–10
- Kurdish Cup
  - Winners (1): 2012–13

== Managerial history ==
- (Iraq) Sardar Saleh
- (Iraq) Mahmoud Majeed
- (Iraq) Qusay Hashim
- (Iraq) Ammar Hussein
