= Al-Hussein SC (Iraq) =

Iraqi football club

Al-Hussein
- Full name: Al-Hussein Sports Club
- Founded: 1999; 27 years ago
- Ground: Five Thousand Stadium
- Capacity: 5,000
- Chairman: Kamil Zghayer
- Manager: Sahel Naeem
- League: Iraqi Premier Division League
- 2025–26: Iraqi Premier Division League, 15th of 20
Home colours	Away colours

Al-Hussein (Arabic: نادي الحسين) is an Iraqi professional football club based in Baghdad. They were crowned champions of the 2015–16 Iraqi First Division League which promoted them to the Iraqi Premier League for the first time in their history.

== History ==
Al-Hussein, named after the Imam of Shia Husayn ibn Ali, were founded in 1999. Their first participation in the Iraq FA Cup was in the 2002–03 edition when they were in the third division of Iraqi football; they faced Al-Tharthar in Round 1 on September 2, 2002, and the game ended 0–0 with Al-Hussein being knocked out of the competition via penalty shootout. By the 2004–05 season, Al-Hussein were in the Iraqi First Division League (the second division of Iraqi football) and in that season, they finished top of their group in the first stage with 20 points from ten games to qualify for the final stage. In the final stage, Al-Hussein needed to finish top of their group to be promoted to the Iraqi Premier League but they only achieved seven points from six matches and failed to gain promotion.

By the time the 2011–12 Iraqi First Division League came around, Al-Hussein had still failed to gain promotion. In that season, Al-Hussein performed poorly, finishing tenth in their 12-team group, losing half of their 22 matches. The 2012–13 Iraqi First Division League was a similar story as they only won one of their ten games and only managed to achieve six points from ten games. In the 2013–14 season, Al-Hussein performed better by winning nine of their 15 matches but this was not enough to qualify them for the second stage of the competition.

After many seasons trying to get promoted to the top division of Iraq, Al-Hussein finally achieved it by being crowned champions of the 2015–16 Iraqi First Division League. They did so by finishing top of their group in the Elite Stage and then also finishing top of their group in the Golden Stage. That season, they also participated in the 2015–16 Iraq FA Cup and they were one of the best-performing teams in the tournament. In the preliminary round, they knocked out Al-Etisalat with a 2–1 win, and in the round of 32 they produced one of the biggest upsets of the cup, knocking out Al-Mina'a, one of the top teams in the Iraqi Premier League, with a 2–1 scoreline. They eased past fellow First Division League team Balad 3–0 in the round of 16 to qualify for the quarter-finals, being one of only two lower division teams to reach the quarter-finals of that competition. In the quarter-final, Al-Hussein were drawn with Al-Zawra'a, who would eventually win the Iraqi Premier League that season without a single loss. However, Al-Hussein produced another shocking result, inflicting the first defeat of the season on Al-Zawra'a by beating them 2–1. But, unlike the previous rounds, the quarter-final consisted of two legs rather than just one, so Al-Zawra'a managed to recover the tie in the second leg and defeat Al-Hussein 3–1 to knock them out 4–3 on aggregate.

== Managerial history ==
- (Iraq) Maitham Dael-Haq
- (Iraq) Adel Acher (2018–2019)
- (Iraq) Sadiq Saadoun (2019–2019)
- (Iraq) Ziyad Qasim (2019–2020) (caretaker)
- (Iraq) Ali Wahab (2020–2020)
- (Iraq) Sabah Abdul Hassan (2020–)
- (Iraq) Karim Qumbil
- (Iraq) Kadhim Yousef
- (Iraq) Habib Jafar
- (Iraq) Sahel Naeem

== Honours ==
- Iraqi Premier Division League (second tier)
  - Winner (1): 2015–16
