= Maysan SC =

Iraqi football club

- Full name: Maysan Sports Club
- Founded: 1963; 63 years ago
- Ground: Maysan Stadium
- Capacity: 25,000
- Chairman: Ali Jabbar
- Manager: Mizher Rahim
- League: Iraqi Premier Division League
- 2025–26: Iraqi Premier Division League, 17th of 20
| Home colours | Away colours |

Maysan Sports Club (Arabic: نادي ميسان), is an Iraqi football team based in Amarah, Maysan, that plays in Iraqi Premier Division League.

== History ==
=== in Premier League ===
The Maysan team played in the Iraqi Premier League (the top level) for the first time in the 1997–98 season, the team occupied ninth place at the end of the season, which is considered an achievement for a young team in the adult league for the first time, then played in the Premier League for nine separate seasons at a lower level, until finished the 2009–10 season in bottom place in the standings at the end of the season, and was relegated to the Iraqi First Division League.

== Managerial history ==
- (Iraq) Ibrahim Shaker
- (Iraq) Ramadhan Jassim
- (Iraq) Mizher Rahim
- (Iraq) Salman Abdul Hassan
- (Iraq) Wathiq Aswad
- (Iraq) Qaed Majed
- (Iraq) Ahmed Zuhair
