= Iraqi Premier Division League =

- Founded: 1974; 52 years ago
- Country: Iraq
- Number of clubs: 20
- Level on pyramid: 2
- Promotion to: Iraq Stars League
- Relegation to: Iraqi First Division League
- Domestic cup: Iraq FA Cup
- International cup(s): AFC Champions League Two (via Iraq FA Cup)
- Current champions: Al-Jolan (1st title) (2025–26)
- Most championships: Al-Minaa; Al-Mosul (3 titles each)
- Broadcaster(s): Al-Iraqiya Sports
- Current: 2026–27 Iraqi Premier Division League

The Iraqi Premier Division League (Arabic: دوري الدرجة الممتازة العراقي) is the second-highest division of the Iraqi football league system after the Iraq Stars League. The league is contested by 20 clubs and is operated by the Iraq Football Association (IFA). The current format sees 20 teams playing 38 matches each (playing each team in the league twice, home and away), totalling 380 matches in the season.

Each season, the two top-finishing teams in the Premier Division League are automatically promoted to the Stars League. The third and fourth-placed teams compete in a play-off match, with the winner qualifying for the two-legged promotion play-off against the 18th-placed team from the Stars League. The two lowest-finishing teams are relegated to the First Division League, while the 18th-placed team enters a two-legged relegation play-off with the third-placed team from the First Division League.

In the 2023–24 season, the competition's name was changed from First Division League to Premier Division League. The current champions are Al-Jolan, who won the title in the 2025–26 season. Al-Minaa and Al-Mosul are the record holders in the tournament having won three titles each.

== Competition name ==
| Period | Name |
|---|---|
| 1974–1995 | National Clubs Second Division League |
| 1995–1999 | First Division League |
| 1999–2000 | Second Division League |
| 2000–2002 | First Division League |
| 2002–2003 | Second Division League |
| 2003–2023 | First Division League |
| 2023–present | Premier Division League |

=== Media perception and challenges ===
The Iraqi Premier Division League is colloquially known in the media as Dawri Al-Madhaleem ("Oppressed League"), a nickname reflecting the limited attention it receives from media outlets, governing bodies, and refereeing authorities. Clubs competing in the division often face significant financial constraints, and many operate with inadequate infrastructure and stadium facilities. Despite these difficulties, the league plays a crucial role in the development of Iraqi football and frequently serves as a platform for emerging players.

== List of champions ==
| No. | Season | Champion |
|---|---|---|
| 1 | 1974–75 | Al-Zawraa |
| 2 | 1975–76 | Al-Ittihad |
| 3 | 1976–77 | Multiple groups |
| 4 | 1977–78 | Al-Shabab |
| 5 | 1978–79 | Al-Bahri |
| 6 | 1979–80 | Al-Adhamiya |
| 7 | 1980–81 | Al-Ittihad |
| 8 | 1981–82 | Al-Mosul |
| 9 | 1982–83 | Wahid Huzairan (Note: Now known as Kirkuk.) |
| 10 | 1983–84 | Al-Rasheed |
| 11 | 1984–85 | Multiple groups |
| 12 | 1985–86 | Al-Bahri |
| 13 | 1986–87 | Al-Minaa |
| 14 | 1987–88 | Multiple groups |
| 15 | 1988–89 | Samarra |
| 16 | 1989–90 | Al-Minaa |
| 17 | 1990–91 | Al-Amana (Note: Now known as Amanat Baghdad.) |
| 18 | 1991–92 | Saad |

| No. | Season | Champion |
|---|---|---|
| 19 | 1992–93 | Multiple groups |
| 20 | 1993–94 | No promotion |
| 21 | 1994–95 | No promotion |
| 22 | 1995–96 | Al-Sulaikh |
| 23 | 1996–97 | Diyala |
| 24 | 1997–98 | Duhok |
| 25 | 1998–99 | Erbil |
| 26 | 1999–2000 | No promotion |
| 27 | 2000–01 | Kirkuk |
| 28 | 2001–02 | Al-Mosul |
| 29 | 2002–03 | Multiple groups |
| 30 | 2003–04 | Abandoned |
| 31 | 2004–05 | Multiple groups |
| 32 | 2005–06 | Multiple groups |
| 33 | 2006–07 | Multiple groups |
| 34 | 2007–08 | Multiple groups |
| 35 | 2008–09 | Multiple groups |
| 36 | 2009–10 | Peshmerga (Note: Now known as Peshmerga Sulaymaniya.) |

| No. | Season | Champion |
|---|---|---|
| 37 | 2010–11 | Al-Shirqat |
| 38 | 2011–12 | Sulaymaniya |
| 39 | 2012–13 | Al-Karkh |
| 40 | 2013–14 | Multiple groups |
| 41 | 2014–15 | Al-Samawa |
| 42 | 2015–16 | Al-Hussein |
| 43 | 2016–17 | Al-Diwaniya |
| 44 | 2017–18 | Al-Karkh |
| 45 | 2018–19 | Al-Qasim |
| 46 | 2019–20 | Abandoned |
| 47 | 2020–21 | Al-Sinaa |
| 48 | 2021–22 | Al-Hudood |
| 49 | 2022–23 | Al-Minaa |
| 50 | 2023–24 | Diyala |
| 51 | 2024–25 | Al-Mosul |
| 52 | 2025–26 | Al-Jolan |

=== Most successful clubs ===
| Club | Titles | Winning seasons |
|---|---|---|
| Al-Minaa | 3 | 1986–87, 1989–90, 2022–23 |
| Al-Mosul | 3 | 1981–82, 2001–02, 2024–25 |
| Al-Ittihad | 2 | 1975–76, 1980–81 |
| Al-Bahri | 2 | 1978–79, 1985–86 |
| Kirkuk | 2 | 1982–83, 2000–01 |
| Al-Karkh | 2 | 2012–13, 2017–18 |
| Diyala | 2 | 1996–97, 2023–24 |
| Al-Zawraa | 1 | 1974–75 |
| Al-Shabab | 1 | 1977–78 |
| Al-Adhamiya | 1 | 1979–80 |
| Al-Rasheed | 1 | 1983–84 |
| Samarra | 1 | 1988–89 |
| Amanat Baghdad | 1 | 1990–91 |
| Saad | 1 | 1991–92 |
| Al-Sulaikh | 1 | 1995–96 |
| Duhok | 1 | 1997–98 |
| Erbil | 1 | 1998–99 |
| Peshmerga Sulaymaniya | 1 | 2009–10 |
| Al-Shirqat | 1 | 2010–11 |
| Sulaymaniya | 1 | 2011–12 |
| Al-Samawa | 1 | 2014–15 |
| Al-Hussein | 1 | 2015–16 |
| Al-Diwaniya | 1 | 2016–17 |
| Al-Qasim | 1 | 2018–19 |
| Al-Sinaa | 1 | 2020–21 |
| Al-Hudood | 1 | 2021–22 |
| Al-Jolan | 1 | 2025–26 |

== See also ==
- Iraq Stars League
- Iraq FA Cup
- Iraqi Super Cup
