= 2021–22 Iraqi Third Division League =

48th Iraqi Third Division League season

Iraqi Third Division League
- Season: 2021–22
- All statistics correct as of 3 May 2022.

The 2021–22 Iraqi Third Division League was the 48th season of what is now called the Iraqi Second Division League, the fourth tier of the Iraqi football league system, since its establishment in 1974. The number of clubs in the league have varied throughout history for various reasons; 173 clubs participated in this year's edition. The top 38 teams in the league are promoted directly to Iraqi Second Division League. There is no general date for the start of the league, but each subsidiary football association chooses the best time to start the league in their region.

== Teams ==
A total of 173 teams are competing for the league after some teams withdrew for financial reasons. The teams are originally promoted to the Iraqi Second Division League based on the rule of one qualified team out of every five participating teams. The number of teams that will be promoted to the Second Division League will be 38 teams.

== Overview ==
The 173 clubs are supposed to be divided into 18 groups by location (some of these groups play in subgroups as well), and each group represents the province to which these clubs belong and lies within its borders. But there are 5 provinces that do not have clubs that play in this level.

No.	Provinces	Teams	Promotion to the Iraqi Second Division League
1	Dohuk		
2	Nineveh	Al-Ayadhiyah; Al-Hadbaa; Bazwaya; Hamidat; Kafaat Nineveh; Narkal; Qalat Tel Afar; Salam Tel Afar; Shabab Al-Qayyara; Shabab Sinjar; Sinjar; Talsquf	Al-Hadbaa; Kafaat Nineveh
3	Erbil		
4	Kirkuk	Al-Abbasi; Al-Amal Al-Shaabi; Al-Baiariq; Al-Ekhaa; Al-Liqaa; Al-Manara; Al-Nasr Al-Kirkukli; Al-Nujoom Daquq; Al-Oruba; Al-Qalaa; Al-Quriyah; Al-Rafidain; Al-Rashad; Al-Rasheed; Al-Riyadh; Al-Suqoor; Al-Turkman; Al-Zab; Altun Kupri; Baba Gurgur; Bradost; Dumez; Ittihad Al-Hawija; Ittihad Kirkuk; Kaywan; Khak; Kirkuk; Leylan; Naft Al-Shamal; New Sulav; Qandeel; Qarah Nav; Shabab Al-Dibis; Taza; Teseen; Wahid Huzairan	Al-Nasr Al-Kirkukli; Al-Quriyah; Al-Riyadh; Bradost; Naft Al-Shamal; Qandeel; Taza
5	Sulaymaniyah		
6	Saladin	Al-Dhuluiya; Al-Hajaj; Al-Ishaqi; Al-Jarnaf; Al-Malwiya; Al-Sahel Al-Aysar; Masafi Al-Shamal; Saad; Tikrit	Al-Ishaqi; Masafi Al-Shamal
7	Al Anbar	A'ali Al-Furat; Abu Risha; Al-Anqaa; Al-Baghdadi; Al-Dawar; Al-Falluja; Al-Karma; Al-Jazira; Al-Mustaqbal; Al-Nassaf; Al-Rutba; Al-Saqlawiya; Al-Sumoud; Al-Taawoun; Anah; Habbaniyat Al-Sumood; Haditha; Rawa	Al-Falluja; Al-Karma; Anah; Habbaniyat Al-Sumood
8	Baghdad	Abnaa Al-Madina; Al-Ain; Al-Atheer; Al-Baiyaa; Al-Difaa Al-Jawi; Al-Fatah; Al-Hashd Al-Shaabi; Al-Hurriya; Al-Nahdha; Al-Iskan; Al-Shabab; Al-Sinaat Al-Harbiya; Al-Siyaha; Al-Tatweer; Al-Tijara; Aliyat Al-Shorta; Basmaya; Biladi; Junoob Baghdad; Nidaa Al-Amin; Shabab Al-Khairat	Abnaa Al-Madina; Al-Hashd Al-Shaabi; Al-Iskan; Al-Siyaha; Al-Tijara; Aliyat Al-Shorta
9	Diyala	Al-Mansouriya; Al-Shaheed Arkan; Al-Sudour; Al-Wajihiya; Al-Yarmouk; Bani Saad; Baquba; Buhriz; Hibhib; Mandali	Al-Shaheed Arkan; Al-Wajihiya
10	Karbala	Al-Ebdaa; Al-Ghadeer; Al-Iraq; Al-Jamahir; Al-Nidhal; Al-Osra; Al-Rawdhatain; Al-Shaheed Abeer; Ain Al-Tamur; Shabab Al-Hussein	Al-Ghadeer; Al-Osra
11	Babil	Abi Gharaq; Al-Baladi; Al-Hashimiya; Al-Hilla; Al-Jawhara; Al-Mahawil; Al-Shomali; Hittin; Ibrahim Al-Khalil; Jabla; Jenaain Babil; Khikan	Al-Jawhara; Al-Mahawil; Jenaain Babil
12	Wasit	Al-Aziziyah; Al-Dujaila; Al-Falahiya; Al-Izza; Al-Muntadher; Al-Nahrain; Al-Sharqiya; Al-Shuhadaa; Al-Wafaa; Al-Wydad; Al-Zaytoun; Al-Zubaidiya; Damuk; Wasit	Al-Aziziyah; Al-Izza; Al-Zubaidiya; Al-Zaytoun
13	Najaf		
14	Al-Qādisiyyah	Al-Intifadha; Al-Mahanawiya; Al-Yaqdha; Aziz Al-Iraq; Ghammas; Sumer	Al-Intifadha; Al-Mahanawiya
15	Maysan	Ahrar Maysan; Al-Amir; Al-Mejar; Al-Resala; Al-Shaheed Saad; Ali Al-Gharbi; Kumayt	Al-Amir; Al-Mejar
16	Muthanna		
17	Dhi Qar	Al-Chibayish; Al-Dhifaf; Al-Fohoud; Al-Fajr; Al-Gharraf; Al-Nassr; Qalat Sukar; Dhi Qar	Al-Chibayish; Al-Gharraf
18	Basra	Al-Dair; Al-Faw; Al-Junoob; Al-Khor; Al-Maqal; Al-Midaina; Al-Noor; Al-Shabab Al-Basri; Medinat Al-Shuhadaa; Thaghar Al-Basra	Al-Dair; Al-Maqal; Al-Shabab Al-Basri

== League table ==
=== Diyala Province League ===
==== Group 1 ====
Pos	Team	Pld	W	D	L	GF	GA	GD	Pts	Promotion
1	Al-Wajihiya	8	5	1	2	18	15	+3	16	Promotion to the Iraqi Second Division League
2	Bani Saad	8	4	3	1	21	7	+14	15	
3	Al-Sudour	8	4	2	2	11	6	+5	14	
4	Hibhib	8	3	2	3	17	13	+4	11	
5	Al-Yarmouk	8	0	0	8	4	30	−26	0	

Source: iraqi.3rd
Rules for classification: 1) points; 2) head-to-head points; 3) head-to-head goal difference; 4) goal difference; 5) number of wins; 6) number of goals scored.

==== Group 2 ====
Pos	Team	Pld	W	D	L	GF	GA	GD	Pts	Promotion
1	Al-Shaheed Arkan	8	6	1	1	19	8	+11	19	Promotion to the Iraqi Second Division League
2	Buhriz	8	5	1	2	17	5	+12	16	
3	Al-Mansouriya	8	3	2	3	16	14	+2	11	
4	Mandali	8	2	2	4	15	16	−1	8	
5	Baquba	8	1	0	7	6	30	−24	3	

Source: iraqi.3rd
Rules for classification: 1) points; 2) head-to-head points; 3) head-to-head goal difference; 4) goal difference; 5) number of wins; 6) number of goals scored.

=== Karbala Province League ===
==== Group 1 ====
Pos	Team	Pld	W	D	L	GF	GA	GD	Pts	Promotion
1	Al-Osra	8	5	2	1	23	13	+10	17	Promotion to the Iraqi Second Division League
2	Al-Jamahir	8	4	3	1	11	7	+4	15	
3	Al-Shaheed Abeer	8	5	0	3	14	13	+1	15	
4	Al-Iraq	8	2	0	6	7	13	−6	6	
5	Al-Rawdhatain	8	1	1	6	9	18	−9	4	

Source: iraqi.3rd
Rules for classification: 1) points; 2) head-to-head points; 3) head-to-head goal difference; 4) goal difference; 5) number of wins; 6) number of goals scored.

==== Group 2 ====
Pos	Team	Pld	W	D	L	GF	GA	GD	Pts	Promotion
1	Al-Ghadeer	8	5	3	0	14	6	+8	18	Promotion to the Iraqi Second Division League
2	Al-Ebdaa	8	4	2	2	17	8	+9	14	
3	Al-Nidhal	8	4	1	3	15	8	+7	13	
4	Shabab Al-Hussein	8	2	2	4	11	18	−7	8	
5	Ain Al-Tamur	8	1	0	7	10	23	−13	3	

Source: iraqi.3rd
Rules for classification: 1) points; 2) head-to-head points; 3) head-to-head goal difference; 4) goal difference; 5) number of wins; 6) number of goals scored.

=== Babil Province League ===
==== Group 1 ====
Pos	Team	Pld	W	D	L	GF	GA	GD	Pts	Promotion
1	Al-Mahawil	6	6	0	0	14	4	+10	18	Promotion to the Iraqi Second Division League
2	Hittin	6	3	1	2	11	6	+5	10	
3	Al-Hilla	6	1	1	4	5	13	−8	4	
4	Al-Hashimiya	6	0	2	4	5	12	−7	2	

Source: iraqi.3rd
Rules for classification: 1) points; 2) head-to-head points; 3) head-to-head goal difference; 4) goal difference; 5) number of wins; 6) number of goals scored.

==== Group 2 ====
Pos	Team	Pld	W	D	L	GF	GA	GD	Pts	Promotion
1	Al-Jawhara	6	5	1	0	14	0	+14	16	Promotion to the Iraqi Second Division League
2	Al-Baladi	6	2	3	1	10	8	+2	9	
3	Khikan	6	2	1	3	13	13	0	7	
4	Al-Shomali	6	0	1	5	5	21	−16	1	

Source: iraqi.3rd
Rules for classification: 1) points; 2) head-to-head points; 3) head-to-head goal difference; 4) goal difference; 5) number of wins; 6) number of goals scored.

==== Group 3 ====
Pos	Team	Pld	W	D	L	GF	GA	GD	Pts	Promotion
1	Jenaain Babil	6	5	1	0	13	3	+10	16	Promotion to the Iraqi Second Division League
2	Ibrahim Al-Khalil	6	2	3	1	10	8	+2	9	
3	Jabla	6	1	1	4	5	9	−4	4	
4	Abi Gharaq	6	1	1	4	3	11	−8	4	

Source: iraqi.3rd
Rules for classification: 1) points; 2) head-to-head points; 3) head-to-head goal difference; 4) goal difference; 5) number of wins; 6) number of goals scored.

=== Maysan Province League ===
Pos	Team	Pld	W	D	L	GF	GA	GD	Pts	Promotion
1	Al-Mejar	6	3	3	0	5	1	+4	12	Promotion to the Iraqi Second Division League
2	Al-Amir	6	3	3	0	5	1	+4	12	Promotion to the Iraqi Second Division League
3	Ali Al-Gharbi	6	3	2	1	7	3	+4	11	
4	Kumayt	6	2	2	2	7	7	0	8	
5	Al-Shaheed Saad	6	2	1	3	8	7	+1	7	
6	Al-Resala	6	2	0	4	9	9	0	6	
7	Ahrar Maysan	6	0	1	5	7	19	−12	1	

Source: iraqi.3rd
Rules for classification: 1) points; 2) goal difference; 3) number of goals scored.

=== Dhi Qar Province League ===
Pos	Team	Pld	W	D	L	GF	GA	GD	Pts	Promotion
1	Al-Chibayish	7	5	0	2	17	10	+7	15	Promotion to the Iraqi Second Division League
2	Al-Gharraf	7	4	2	1	13	8	+5	14	Promotion to the Iraqi Second Division League
3	Al-Fohoud	7	4	0	3	12	8	+4	12	
4	Al-Nassr	7	3	3	1	6	5	+1	12	
5	Dhi Qar	7	2	1	4	7	10	−3	7	
6	Al-Fajr	7	1	3	3	9	11	−2	6	
7	Al-Dhifaf	7	1	3	3	5	11	−6	6	
8	Qalat Sukar	7	1	2	4	9	16	−7	5	

Source: iraqi.3rd
Rules for classification: 1) points; 2) goal difference; 3) number of goals scored.
