= 2021–22 Iraq FA Cup =

Tournament details
- Country: Iraq
- Dates: 10 September 2021 – 16 July 2022
- Teams: 168

Final positions
- Champions: Al-Karkh (1st title)
- Runners-up: Al-Kahrabaa

Tournament statistics
- Matches played: 180
- Goals scored: 451 (2.51 per match)

The 2021–22 Iraq FA Cup was the 32nd edition of the Iraqi knockout football cup as a club competition, the main domestic cup in Iraqi football, featuring a record 168 clubs from the top four tiers of the Iraqi football league system, (20 from the Iraqi Premier League, 24 from the Iraqi First Division League and 124 from the Iraqi Second Division League and Iraqi Third Division League). The competition began on 10 September 2021 with the first-round matches involving teams from the third and fourth tiers, and the final was played on 16 July 2022 at Al-Madina Stadium in Baghdad.

The winners of the competition were Al-Karkh, who won their first title with a 2–1 victory over Al-Kahrabaa.

== Teams ==
The Iraq FA Cup is a knockout competition with 168 participants: 20 teams from the Iraqi Premier League, 24 from the Iraqi First Division League, and 124 in total from the Iraqi Second Division League and Iraqi Third Division League. (Note: Participation in the 2021–22 edition of the Iraq FA Cup is compulsory for Premier League and First Division League clubs and optional for Second Division League and Third Division League clubs.)

Round	Number of fixtures	New entries this round	Divisions entering this round
First round	59	124	Second Division League (Level 3) and Third Division League (Level 4)
Second round	32	None	None
Third round	20	None	None
Fourth round	22	24	First Division League (Level 2)
Fifth round	11	None	None
Sixth round	5	None	None
Round of 32	16	20	Premier League (Level 1)
Round of 16	8	None	None
Quarter-finals	4	None	None
Semi-finals	2	None	None
Final	1	None	None

== Schedule ==
The rounds of the 2021–22 competition were scheduled as follows:

Round	Draw date	Match dates
First round	24 August 2021	10–13 September 2021
Second round	24 August 2021	14–17 September 2021
Third round	24 August 2021	19–30 September 2021
Fourth round	4 October 2021	7–12 October 2021
Fifth round	4 October 2021	13–19 October 2021
Sixth round	4 October 2021	15–19 October 2021
Round of 32	20 October 2021	9–11 November 2021
Round of 16	20 October 2021	4–5 December 2021
Quarter-finals	20 October 2021	12–13 June 2022
Semi-finals	20 October 2021	28 June 2022
Final	20 October 2021	16 July 2022

== First round ==
Gharb Baghdad, Junoob Baghdad, Kara, Midya, Sahl Nineveh and Qazaniya received byes to the second round.

Baghdad Section

10 September 2021	Al-Taji (3)	0–0 (4–2 p)	Biladi (4)	Baghdad
15:30 UTC+03:00				Stadium: Bismaya Stadium

10 September 2021	Al-Atheer (4)	0–2	Haifa (3)	Baghdad
15:30 UTC+03:00				Stadium: Al-Tahadi Stadium

10 September 2021	Al-Mahmoudiya (3)	2–0	Jisr Diyala (4)	Baghdad
15:30 UTC+03:00				Stadium: Al-Mahmoudiya Stadium

10 September 2021	Al-Hashd Al-Shaabi (4)	3–1	Al-Mohandessin (3)	Baghdad
15:30 UTC+03:00				Stadium: Al-Kashafa Stadium

11 September 2021	Al-Etisalat (3)	6–0	Al-Baiyaa (4)	Baghdad
15:30 UTC+03:00				Stadium: Al-Baiyaa Stadium

11 September 2021	Al-Zafaraniya (3)	0–0 (7–8 p)	Masafi Al-Wasat (3)	Baghdad
15:30 UTC+03:00				Stadium: Al-Jaish Stadium

11 September 2021	Al-Jamiea (3)	6–1	Muhafadha Baghdad (4)	Baghdad
15:30 UTC+03:00				Stadium: Al-Jamiea Stadium

Central Euphrates Section

10 September 2021	Uruk (3)	1–0	Al-Ghadhriya (3)	Muthanna
15:30 UTC+03:00				Stadium: Al-Muthanna Stadium

10 September 2021	Al-Mahawil (4)	0–0 (4–2 p)	Abi Gharaq (4)	Al-Mahawil
15:30 UTC+03:00				Stadium: Al-Mahawil Stadium

10 September 2021	Al-Iraq (4)	3–1	Ibrahim Al-Khalil (4)	Karbala
15:30 UTC+03:00				Stadium: Al-Iraq Stadium

10 September 2021	Aziz Al-Iraq (4)	6–0	Al-Taff (4)	Al-Baheer Stadium
15:30 UTC+03:00

11 September 2021	Khikan (4)	0–1	Al-Salman (3)	Al-Taliea Stadium
15:30 UTC+03:00

11 September 2021	Al-Muthanna (3)	1–1 (5–4 p)	Jenaain Babil (4)	Muthanna
15:30 UTC+03:00				Stadium: Al-Muthanna Stadium

11 September 2021	Al-Shamiya (3)	3–2	Al-Kifl (3)	Shahid Mazin Hamoud Stadium
15:30 UTC+03:00

11 September 2021	Jabla (4)	3–0	Al-Hashimiya (4)	Jabla Stadium
15:30 UTC+03:00

Al-Anbar Section

10 September 2021	Al-Jolan (3)	3–1	Rawa (4)	Al-Sakaniya Stadium
15:30 UTC+03:00

10 September 2021	Al-Saqlawiya (4)	0–2	A'ali Al-Furat (4)	Saqlawiya
15:30 UTC+03:00				Stadium: Al-Saqlawiya Stadium

10 September 2021	Al-Fosfat (3)	0–0 (4–3 p)	Al-Taawoun (4)	Rawa Stadium
15:30 UTC+03:00

10 September 2021	Al-Sufiya (3)	4–0	Al-Anqa (4)	Al-Anbar
15:30 UTC+03:00				Stadium: Al-Sufiya Stadium

11 September 2021	Habbaniyat Al-Sumoud (4)	0–0 (6–5 p)	Al-Raed (3)	Habbaniya
15:30 UTC+03:00				Stadium: Habbaniyat Al-Sumoud Stadium

11 September 2021	Jazeerat Al-Khalidiya (4)	1–4	Anah (4)	Al-Anbar
15:30 UTC+03:00				Stadium: Al-Sufiya Stadium

11 September 2021	Al-Habbaniya (3)	0–0 (2–3 p)	Al-Qaim (4)	Habbaniya
15:30 UTC+03:00				Stadium: Al-Habbaniya Stadium

11 September 2021	Al-Rutba (4)	6–1	Al-Falluja (4)	Rutba
15:30 UTC+03:00				Stadium: Al-Rutba Stadium

Mosul, Erbil and Duhok Section

10 September 2021	Umal Nineveh (3)	2–1	Al-Mustaqbal Al-Mushriq (3)	Mosul
15:30 UTC+03:00				Stadium: Muntada Al-Mosul Stadium

10 September 2021	Bazwaya (4)	3–2	Rabia (3)	Mosul
15:30 UTC+03:00				Stadium: Al-Amwaj Al-Mosuli Stadium

11 September 2021	Qalat Tel Afar (4)	3–0	Hikna (4)	Mosul
15:30 UTC+03:00				Stadium: Muntada Al-Mosul Stadium

11 September 2021	Al-Amwaj Al-Mosuli (3)	3–1	Tarmi (3)	Mosul
15:30 UTC+03:00				Stadium: Al-Amwaj Al-Mosuli Stadium

12 September 2021	Baladiyat Al-Mosul (3)	5–2	Tel Afar (4)	Mosul
15:30 UTC+03:00				Stadium: Al-Amwaj Al-Mosuli Stadium

Diyala and Salahaddin Section

10 September 2021	Bani Saad (4)	3–3 (2–4 p)	Masafi Al-Shamal (3)	Hibhib
15:30 UTC+03:00				Stadium: Hibhib Stadium

10 September 2021	Tikrit (4)	1–1 (3–5 p)	Buhriz (4)	Salahaddin
15:30 UTC+03:00				Stadium: Salahaddin Stadium

10 September 2021	Balad (3)	3–1	Al-Mansouriya (4)	Balad
15:30 UTC+03:00				Stadium: Balad Stadium

10 September 2021	Shahraban (3)	1–1 (3–2 p)	Al-Sudour (4)	Miqdadiya
15:30 UTC+03:00				Stadium: Al-Miqdadiya Stadium

11 September 2021	Bilad Al-Rafidain (3)	1–4	Al-Dujail (3)	Kuliyat Bilad Al-Rafidain Stadium
15:30 UTC+03:00

11 September 2021	Jadidat Al-Shatt (3)	0–2	Mandali (4)	Hibhib
15:30 UTC+03:00				Stadium: Hibhib Stadium

11 September 2021	Shamal Al-Miqdadiya (4)	1–3	Balad Ruz (3)	Miqdadiya
15:30 UTC+03:00				Stadium: Al-Miqdadiya Stadium

Southern Section

10 September 2021	Al-Aziziya (4)	2–1	Al-Kut (3)	Al-Aziziya
15:30 UTC+03:00				Stadium: Al Aziziyah Stadium

10 September 2021	Al-Midaina (4)	0–1	Al-Zubair (3)	Basra
15:30 UTC+03:00				Stadium: Al-Sadeq Stadium

10 September 2021	Al-Zaeem (3)	2–2 (1–3 p)	Shatt Al-Arab (4)	Al-Suwaira
15:30 UTC+03:00				Stadium: Al-Suwaira Stadium

10 September 2021	Al-Wydad (4)	0–2	Al-Dair (4)	Al-Dakhili Stadium
15:30 UTC+03:00

10 September 2021	Al-Shatra (3)	1–0	Al-Hay (3)	Al-Shatra
15:30 UTC+03:00				Stadium: Al-Shatra Stadium

10 September 2021	Kahrabaa Al-Hartha (3)	3–0 (w/o)	Al-Ahrar (3)	Basra
15:30 UTC+03:00				Stadium: Shatt Al-Arab Stadium

11 September 2021	Al-Maqal (4)	2–2 (4–3 p)	Al-Suwaira (3)	Basra
15:30 UTC+03:00				Stadium: Al-Basra Stadium

11 September 2021	Al-Qurna (3)	0–0 (4–3 p)	Ahrar Maysan (4)	Basra
15:30 UTC+03:00				Stadium: Al-Qurna Stadium

11 September 2021	Al-Shabab Al-Basri (4)	3–0 (w/o)	Baladiyat Al-Nasiriya (3)	Basra
15:30 UTC+03:00				Stadium: Al-Shabab Stadium

11 September 2021	Al-Rifai (3)	3–4	Al-Sadeq (3)	Al-Shatra
15:30 UTC+03:00				Stadium: Al-Shatra Stadium

11 September 2021	Medinat Al-Shuhadaa (4)	0–0 (4–3 p)	Baladiyat Al-Basra (4)	Basra
15:30 UTC+03:00				Stadium: Al-Sadda Al-Mushasha Stadium

11 September 2021	Al-Amir (4)	2–1	Qalat Sukar (4)	Maysan
15:30 UTC+03:00				Stadium: Maysan Secondary Stadium

Kirkuk and Sulaymaniya Section

10 September 2021	Al-Nasr Al-Kirkukli (4)	2–2 (4–5 p)	Al-Riyadh (4)	Kirkuk
15:30 UTC+03:00				Stadium: Naft Al-Shamal Stadium

10 September 2021	Al-Suqoor (4)	2–0	Qandeel (4)	Hawija
15:30 UTC+03:00				Stadium: Al-Hawija Stadium

10 September 2021	Bahr (4)	0–1	Al-Nujoom (4)	Kirkuk
15:30 UTC+03:00				Stadium: Sporting Activity Stadium

10 September 2021	Ittihad Al-Hawija (4)	3–3 (0–2 p)	Al-Rasheed (4)	Hawija
15:30 UTC+03:00				Stadium: Muntada Al-Hawija Stadium

11 September 2021	Al-Zab (4)	2–2 (2–4 p)	Wahid Huzairan (4)	Hawija
15:30 UTC+03:00				Stadium: Al-Hawija Stadium

11 September 2021	Al-Abbasi (4)	0–5	Naft Al-Shamal (4)	Hawija
15:30 UTC+03:00				Stadium: Muntada Al-Hawija Stadium

11 September 2021	Bradost (4)	1–1 (3–4 p)	Khak (4)	Muntada Al-Shorja Stadium
15:30 UTC+03:00

11 September 2021	Shabab Al-Dibis (4)	2–2 (6–5 p)	Peshwa (3)	Kirkuk
15:30 UTC+03:00				Stadium: Khak Stadium

12 September 2021	Al-Hawija (3)	1–0	Al-Oruba (4)	Hawija
15:30 UTC+03:00				Stadium: Al-Hawija Stadium

12 September 2021	Al-Baiariq (4)	0–3	Musalla (3)	Muntada Al-Shorja Stadium
15:30 UTC+03:00

12 September 2021	Baban (3)	8–0	Al-Rafidain (4)	Sulaymaniya
15:30 UTC+03:00				Stadium: Baban Stadium

13 September 2021	Al-Manara (4)	0–1	Kirkuk (4)	Daquq
15:30 UTC+03:00				Stadium: Daquq Stadium

== Second round ==
Al-Hashd Al-Shaabi received a bye to the third round.

Baghdad Section

14 September 2021	Haifa (3)	2–0	Al-Mahmoudiya (3)	Baghdad
15:30 UTC+03:00				Stadium: Haifa Stadium

14 September 2021	Al-Taji (3)	4–1	Gharb Baghdad (4)	Baghdad
15:30 UTC+03:00				Stadium: Al-Taji Stadium

15 September 2021	Al-Jamiea (3)	0–0 (3–1 p)	Junoob Baghdad (4)	Baghdad
15:30 UTC+03:00				Stadium: Al-Taji Stadium

15 September 2021	Masafi Al-Wasat (3)	1–0	Al-Etisalat (3)	Baghdad
15:30 UTC+03:00				Stadium: Al-Masafi Stadium

Central Euphrates Section

15 September 2021	Al-Salman (3)	1–0	Uruk (3)	Al-Salman Stadium
15:30 UTC+03:00

15 September 2021	Al-Mahawil (4)	0–0 (4–5 p)	Al-Muthanna (3)	Al-Mahawil
15:30 UTC+03:00				Stadium: Al-Mahawil Stadium

15 September 2021	Al-Shamiya (3)	1–0	Jabla (4)	Al-Shamiya
15:30 UTC+03:00				Stadium: Al-Shamiya Stadium

15 September 2021	Aziz Al-Iraq (4)	0–1	Al-Iraq (4)	Aziz Al-Iraq Stadium
15:30 UTC+03:00

Al-Anbar Section

14 September 2021	A'ali Al-Furat (4)	0–0 (7–6 p)	Al-Jolan (3)	Fallujah
15:30 UTC+03:00				Stadium: A'ali Al-Furat Stadium

14 September 2021	Al-Sufiya (3)	1–1 (9–8 p)	Al-Fosfat (3)	Al-Anbar
15:30 UTC+03:00				Stadium: Al-Sufiya Stadium

15 September 2021	Anah (4)	4–1	Habbaniyat Al-Sumoud (4)	Anah
15:30 UTC+03:00				Stadium: Anah Stadium

15 September 2021	Al-Qaim (4)	0–0 (4–5 p)	Al-Rutba (4)	Habbaniya
15:30 UTC+03:00				Stadium: Al-Habbaniya Stadium

Mosul, Erbil and Duhok Section

14 September 2021	Umal Nineveh (3)	3–1	Kara (3)	Mosul
15:30 UTC+03:00				Stadium: Muntada Al-Mosul Stadium

15 September 2021	Midya (3)	2–4	Al-Amwaj Al-Mosuli (3)	Midya Stadium
15:30 UTC+03:00

15 September 2021	Qalat Tel Afar (4)	3–3 (5–4 p)	Sahl Nineveh (3)	Mosul
15:30 UTC+03:00				Stadium: Al-Amwaj Al-Mosuli Stadium

16 September 2021	Baladiyat Al-Mosul (3)	0–0 (5–4 p)	Bazwaya (4)	Mosul
15:30 UTC+03:00				Stadium: Al-Amwaj Al-Mosuli Stadium

Diyala and Salahaddin Section

14 September 2021	Shahraban (3)	0–0 (5–4 p)	Balad (3)	Miqdadiya
15:30 UTC+03:00				Stadium: Al-Miqdadiya Stadium

15 September 2021	Al-Dujail (3)	2–0	Qazaniya (4)	Dujail
15:30 UTC+03:00				Stadium: Al-Dujail Stadium

15 September 2021	Mandali (4)	1–2	Balad Ruz (3)	Balad Ruz
15:30 UTC+03:00				Stadium: Balad Ruz Olympic Stadium

15 September 2021	Buhriz (4)	1–1 (3–5 p)	Masafi Al-Shamal (3)	Buhriz
15:30 UTC+03:00				Stadium: Buhriz Stadium

Southern Section

14 September 2021	Al-Zubair (3)	3–0	Al-Aziziya (4)	Basra
15:30 UTC+03:00				Stadium: Al-Zubair Stadium

14 September 2021	Shatt Al-Arab (4)	1–3	Al-Dair (4)	Basra
15:30 UTC+03:00				Stadium: Shatt Al-Arab Stadium

15 September 2021	Kahrabaa Al-Hartha (3)	1–2	Al-Maqal (4)	Basra
15:30 UTC+03:00				Stadium: Shatt Al-Arab Stadium

15 September 2021	Al-Shatra (3)	2–0	Al-Qurna (3)	Al-Shatra
15:30 UTC+03:00				Stadium: Al-Shatra Stadium

15 September 2021	Al-Sadeq (3)	1–0	Al-Shabab Al-Basri (4)	Basra
15:30 UTC+03:00				Stadium: Al-Sadeq Stadium

15 September 2021	Al-Amir (4)	1–3	Medinat Al-Shuhadaa (4)	Maysan
15:30 UTC+03:00				Stadium: Maysan Secondary Stadium

Kirkuk and Sulaymaniya Section

14 September 2021	Al-Riyadh (4)	1–0	Al-Suqoor (4)	Hawija
15:30 UTC+03:00				Stadium: Al-Hawija Stadium

15 September 2021	Al-Rasheed (4)	0–1	Wahid Huzairan (4)	Muntada Al-Shorja Stadium
15:30 UTC+03:00

15 September 2021	Naft Al-Shamal (4)	2–2 (3–1 p)	Al-Nujoom (4)	Kirkuk
15:30 UTC+03:00				Stadium: Naft Al-Shamal Stadium

16 September 2021	Khak (4)	1–3	Musalla (3)	Sulaymaniya
15:30 UTC+03:00				Stadium: Khak Stadium

17 September 2021	Kirkuk (4)	0–1	Al-Hawija (3)	Kirkuk
15:30 UTC+03:00				Stadium: Kirkuk Stadium

17 September 2021	Baban (3)	5–1	Shabab Al-Dibis (4)	Sulaymaniya
15:30 UTC+03:00				Stadium: Khak Stadium

== Third round ==
Haifa received a bye to the third round play-off.

Baghdad Section

20 September 2021	Al-Taji (3)	0–3	Masafi Al-Wasat (3)	Baghdad
15:30 UTC+03:00				Stadium: Al-Taji Stadium

21 September 2021	Al-Jamiea (3)	2–3	Al-Hashd Al-Shaabi (4)	Baghdad
15:30 UTC+03:00				Stadium: Al-Taji Stadium

Central Euphrates Section

20 September 2021	Al-Iraq (4)	1–1 (4–2 p)	Al-Muthanna (3)	Karbala
15:30 UTC+03:00				Stadium: Al-Iraq Stadium

20 September 2021	Al-Salman (3)	0–5	Al-Shamiya (3)	Al-Salman Stadium
15:30 UTC+03:00

Al-Anbar Section

21 September 2021	Al-Rutba (4)	0–1	Anah (4)	Rutba
15:30 UTC+03:00				Stadium: Al-Rutba Stadium

21 September 2021	A'ali Al-Furat (4)	1–1 (3–1 p)	Al-Sufiya (3)	Fallujah
15:30 UTC+03:00				Stadium: A'ali Al-Furat Stadium

Mosul, Erbil and Duhok Section

21 September 2021	Al-Amwaj Al-Mosuli (3)	2–2 (3–2 p)	Qalat Tel Afar (4)	Mosul
15:30 UTC+03:00				Stadium: Al-Amwaj Al-Mosuli Stadium

21 September 2021	Umal Nineveh (3)	0–2	Baladiyat Al-Mosul (3)	Mosul
15:30 UTC+03:00				Stadium: Muntada Al-Mosul Stadium

Diyala and Salahaddin Section

20 September 2021	Balad Ruz (3)	1–2	Al-Dujail (3)	Balad Ruz
15:30 UTC+03:00				Stadium: Balad Ruz Stadium

20 September 2021	Masafi Al-Shamal (3)	5–0	Shahraban (3)	Salahaddin
15:30 UTC+03:00				Stadium: Masafi Al-Shamal Stadium

Southern Section

19 September 2021	Al-Dair (4)	2–1	Al-Zubair (3)	Basra
15:30 UTC+03:00				Stadium: Al-Dair Stadium

19 September 2021	Medinat Al-Shuhadaa (4)	0–1	Al-Sadeq (3)	Basra
15:30 UTC+03:00				Stadium: Al-Sadeq Stadium

19 September 2021	Al-Maqal (4)	1–2	Al-Shatra (3)	Basra
15:30 UTC+03:00				Stadium: Al-Maqal Stadium

Kirkuk and Sulaymaniya Section

19 September 2021	Wahid Huzairan (4)	3–4	Al-Riyadh (4)	Kirkuk
15:30 UTC+03:00				Stadium: Naft Al-Shamal Stadium

20 September 2021	Musalla (3)	2–1	Naft Al-Shamal (4)	Kirkuk
15:30 UTC+03:00				Stadium: Musalla Stadium

22 September 2021	Al-Hawija (3)	2–2 (10–9 p)	Baban (3)	Hawija
15:30 UTC+03:00				Stadium: Al-Hawija Stadium

=== Third round play-off ===
Baghdad Section

25 September 2021	Haifa (3)	0–0 (5–4 p)	Al-Hashd Al-Shaabi (4)	Baghdad
15:30 UTC+03:00				Stadium: Al-Kashafa Stadium

Central Euphrates Section

30 September 2021	Al-Muthanna (3)	3–0	Al-Salman (3)	Muthanna
15:30 UTC+03:00				Stadium: Al-Muthanna Stadium

Al-Anbar Section

24 September 2021	Al-Sufiya (3)	7–2	Al-Rutba (4)	Ramadi
15:30 UTC+03:00				Stadium: Al-Ramadi Stadium

Diyala and Salahaddin Section

24 September 2021	Shahraban (3)	4–2	Balad Ruz (3)	Diyala
15:30 UTC+03:00				Stadium: Diyala Stadium

=== Qualified teams ===
The following 24 teams qualified to the fourth round to be joined by 24 clubs from the First Division League.

Section	Winners	Best losers
Baghdad	Masafi Al-Wasat; Haifa	Al-Hashd Al-Shaabi
Central Euphrates	Al-Iraq; Al-Shamiya	Al-Muthanna
Al-Anbar	Anah; A'ali Al-Furat	Al-Sufiya
Mosul, Erbil and Duhok	Al-Amwaj Al-Mosuli; Baladiyat Al-Mosul	
Diyala and Salahaddin	Al-Dujail; Masafi Al-Shamal	Shahraban
Southern	Al-Dair; Al-Sadeq; Al-Shatra	Medinat Al-Shuhadaa; Al-Maqal
Kirkuk and Sulaymaniya	Al-Riyadh; Musalla; Al-Hawija	Naft Al-Shamal; Baban

== Fourth round ==
Al-Jinsiya, Masafi Al-Wasat, Suq Al-Shuyukh and Al-Muthanna received byes to the fifth round.

Baghdad Section

7 October 2021	Haifa (3)	2–1	Al-Muroor (2)	Baghdad
15:00 UTC+03:00				Stadium: Haifa Stadium

7 October 2021	Al-Hashd Al-Shaabi (4)	1–1 (4–2 p)	Al-Difaa Al-Madani (2)	Baghdad
15:00 UTC+03:00				Stadium: Al-Kashafa Stadium

8 October 2021	Al-Sulaikh (2)	4–3	Al-Hussein (2)	Baghdad
15:00 UTC+03:00				Stadium: Al-Sulaikh Stadium

8 October 2021	Al-Hudood (2)	1–2	Al-Sinaat Al-Kahrabaiya (2)	Baghdad
15:00 UTC+03:00				Stadium: Al-Taji Stadium

Southern and Central Euphrates Section

7 October 2021	Al-Shatra (3)	1–1 (3–4 p)	Medinat Al-Shuhadaa (4)	Al-Shatra
15:00 UTC+03:00				Stadium: Al-Shatra Stadium

7 October 2021	Al-Samawa (2)	1–3	Afak	Samawa
15:00 UTC+03:00				Stadium: Al-Samawa Stadium

7 October 2021	Al-Shamiya (3)	0–0 (2–4 p)	Al-Sadeq (3)	Al-Shamiya
15:00 UTC+03:00				Stadium: Al-Shamiya Stadium

7 October 2021	Maysan (2)	1–1 (4–1 p)	Babil (2)	Maysan
15:00 UTC+03:00				Stadium: Maysan Olympic Stadium

8 October 2021	Al-Nasiriya (2)	0–1	Karbala (2)	Nasiriya
15:00 UTC+03:00				Stadium: Al-Nasiriya Stadium

8 October 2021	Al-Dair (4)	0–1	Al-Bahri (2)	Basra
15:00 UTC+03:00				Stadium: Al-Dair Stadium

8 October 2021	Masafi Al-Junoob (2)	2–0	Al-Maqal (4)	Basra
15:00 UTC+03:00				Stadium: Masafi Al-Junoob Stadium

8 October 2021	Al-Iraq (4)	0–1	Al-Kufa (2)	Karbala
15:00 UTC+03:00				Stadium: Al-Iraq Stadium

Northern and Western Section

7 October 2021	Al-Alam (2)	0–1	Al-Ramadi (2)	Salahaddin
15:00 UTC+03:00				Stadium: Al-Alam Stadium

7 October 2021	Shahraban (3)	0–1	Diyala (2)	Miqdadiya
15:00 UTC+03:00				Stadium: Al-Miqdadiya Stadium

7 October 2021	A'ali Al-Furat (4)	0–0 (4–1 p)	Al-Hawija (3)	Fallujah
15:00 UTC+03:00				Stadium: A'ali Al-Furat Stadium

8 October 2021	Duhok (2)	3–0	Al-Shirqat (2)	Duhok
15:00 UTC+03:00				Stadium: Duhok Stadium

8 October 2021	Al-Amwaj Al-Mosuli (3)	4–1	Naft Al-Shamal (3)	Mosul
15:00 UTC+03:00				Stadium: Al-Amwaj Al-Mosuli Stadium

8 October 2021	Baban (3)	1–0	Musalla (3)	Sulaymaniya
15:00 UTC+03:00				Stadium: Baban Stadium

8 October 2021	Baladiyat Al-Mosul (3)	0–0 (4–5 p)	Al-Sufiya (3)	Mosul
15:00 UTC+03:00				Stadium: Muntada Al-Mosul Stadium

8 October 2021	Masafi Al-Shamal (3)	0–1	Peshmerga Sulaymaniya (2)	Salahaddin
15:00 UTC+03:00				Stadium: Masafi Al-Shamal Stadium

8 October 2021	Al-Dujail (3)	0–0 (4–1 p)	Ghaz Al-Shamal (2)	Dujail
15:00 UTC+03:00				Stadium: Al-Dujail Stadium

12 October 2021	Al-Riyadh (4)	0–0 (4–3 p)	Anah (4)	Hawija
15:00 UTC+03:00				Stadium: Al-Hawija Stadium

== Fifth round ==
Al-Sulaikh, Al-Sinaat Al-Kahrabaiya, Afak and Al-Sadeq received byes to the sixth round.

Baghdad Section

12 October 2021	Haifa (3)	0–0 (2–4 p)	Al-Jinsiya (2)	Baghdad
15:00 UTC+03:00				Stadium: Al-Taji Stadium

12 October 2021	Al-Hashd Al-Shaabi (4)	3–1	Masafi Al-Wasat (3)	Baghdad
15:00 UTC+03:00				Stadium: Al-Kashafa Stadium

Southern and Central Euphrates Section

12 October 2021	Karbala (2)	3–0	Al-Bahri (2)	Karbala
15:00 UTC+03:00				Stadium: Karbala Stadium

12 October 2021	Medinat Al-Shuhadaa (4)	0–1	Suq Al-Shuyukh (2)	Basra
15:00 UTC+03:00				Stadium: Medinat Al-Shuhadaa Stadium

12 October 2021	Al-Kufa (2)	1–1 (2–4 p)	Masafi Al-Junoob (2)	Najaf
15:00 UTC+03:00				Stadium: Al-Najaf Secondary Stadium

12 October 2021	Maysan (2)	1–1 (3–4 p)	Al-Muthanna (3)	Amara
15:00 UTC+03:00				Stadium: Al-Maimouna Stadium

Northern and Western Section

13 October 2021	Al-Ramadi (2)	0–0 (3–2 p)	Duhok (2)	Ramadi
15:00 UTC+03:00				Stadium: Al-Ramadi Stadium

13 October 2021	Al-Sufiya (3)	3–0 (w/o)	Baban (3)	Al-Anbar
15:00 UTC+03:00				Stadium: Al-Sufiya Stadium

13 October 2021	Peshmerga Sulaymaniya (2)	4–0	Al-Amwaj Al-Mosuli (3)	Sulaymaniya
15:00 UTC+03:00				Stadium: Farmande Stadium

13 October 2021	Diyala (2)	2–0	A'ali Al-Furat (4)	Diyala
15:00 UTC+03:00				Stadium: Diyala Stadium

19 October 2021	Al-Dujail (3)	2–0	Al-Riyadh (3)	Dujail
15:00 UTC+03:00				Stadium: Al-Dujail Stadium

== Sixth round ==
Karbala, Masafi Al-Junoob, Al-Ramadi, Al-Sufiya, Peshmerga Sulaymaniya, Diyala and Al-Dujail received byes to the round of 32.

Baghdad Section

15 October 2021	Al-Sulaikh (2)	1–1 (4–1 p)	Al-Jinsiya (2)	Baghdad
15:00 UTC+03:00				Stadium: Al-Sulaikh Stadium

15 October 2021	Al-Sinaat Al-Kahrabaiya (2)	2–1	Al-Hashd Al-Shaabi (4)	Baghdad
15:00 UTC+03:00				Stadium: Al-Sinaa Stadium

Southern and Central Euphrates Section

16 October 2021	Suq Al-Shuyukh (2)	0–0 (4–3 p)	Afak (2)	Suq Al-Shuyukh
15:00 UTC+03:00				Stadium: Suq Al-Shuyukh Stadium

17 October 2021	Al-Muthanna (3)	0–0 (4–3 p)	Al-Sadeq (3)	Muthanna
15:00 UTC+03:00				Stadium: Al-Muthanna Stadium

=== Sixth round play-off ===
Baghdad Section

19 October 2021	Al-Jinsiya (2)	1–1 (6–5 p)	Al-Hashd Al-Shaabi (4)	Baghdad
15:00 UTC+03:00				Stadium: Al-Taji Stadium

== Final phase ==
=== Bracket ===
Round of 32; 9–11 November 2021
Diyala	2
Samarra	0
Al-Minaa	1
Al-Karkh	2
Al-Shorta	1
Al-Sufiya	0
Erbil (p)	0 (4)
Al-Ramadi	0 (3)
Al-Zawraa	3
Al-Sinaat Al-Kahrabaiya	0
Al-Qasim	1
Peshmerga Sulaymaniya	0
Al-Muthanna	0
Naft Al-Basra	3
Al-Quwa Al-Jawiya	2
Naft Maysan	1
Al-Kahrabaa	1
Al-Dujail	0
Newroz (p)	0 (4)
Al-Naft	0 (2)
Karbala	0
Al-Najaf	1
Amanat Baghdad	1
Suq Al-Shuyukh	0
Masafi Al-Junoob (p)	2 (5)
Al-Sinaa	2 (4)
Al-Sulaikh (p)	0 (5)
Al-Jinsiya	0 (4)
Zakho (p)	0 (8)
Al-Talaba	0 (7)
Al-Diwaniya	0 (1)
Naft Al-Wasat (p)	0 (3)

Round of 16; 4–5 December 2021
Al-Karkh	2
Diyala	1
Erbil (p)	0 (4)
Al-Shorta	0 (3)
Al-Qasim	0
Al-Zawraa	1
Naft Al-Basra	1 (3)
Al-Quwa Al-Jawiya (p)	1 (5)
Newroz	0
Al-Kahrabaa	2
Al-Najaf	0
Amanat Baghdad	2
Al-Sulaikh	1
Masafi Al-Junoob	2
Naft Al-Wasat	1 (1)
Zakho (p)	1 (4)

Quarter-finals; 12–13 June 2022
Al-Karkh	1 (5)
Erbil	1 (3)
Al-Zawraa	2
Al-Quwa Al-Jawiya	1
Al-Kahrabaa	0 (4)
Amanat Baghdad (p)	0 (2)
Zakho	2
Masafi Al-Junoob	0

Semi-finals; 28 June 2022
Al-Zawraa	0
Al-Karkh	1
Al-Kahrabaa	2
Zakho	0

Final; 16 July 2022
Al-Karkh	2
Al-Kahrabaa	1

== Round of 32 ==
The round featured 20 teams from the Premier League (level 1), 9 teams from First Division League (level 2) and 3 teams from Second Division League (level 3).

9 November 2021	Zakho (1)	0–0 (8–7 p)	Al-Talaba (1)	Zakho
14:30 UTC+03:00				Stadium: Zakho International Stadium; Referee: Toana Uthman

9 November 2021	Al-Diwaniya (1)	0–0 (1–3 p)	Naft Al-Wasat (1)	Al-Diwaniya
14:30 UTC+03:00				Stadium: Al-Diwaniya Stadium; Referee: Ahmed Qasim Fadhel

9 November 2021	Al-Minaa (1)	1–2	Al-Karkh (1)	Basra
17:00 UTC+03:00	Goal		Abis 24'; Saad 36'	Stadium: Al-Fayhaa Stadium; Referee: Mohanad Manaf

10 November 2021	Al-Shorta (1)	1–0	Al-Sufiya (3)	Baghdad
14:30 UTC+03:00	Dawood 79'; Natiq (red card) 79'			Stadium: Al-Sinaa Stadium; Referee: Mohammed Salah

10 November 2021	Diyala (2)	2–0	Samarra (1)	Diyala
14:30 UTC+03:00	Uthman; Hakeem			Stadium: Diyala Stadium; Referee: Ahmed Juma

10 November 2021	Al-Muthanna (3)	0–3	Naft Al-Basra (1)	Muthanna
14:30 UTC+03:00			Njombe; Zahid	Stadium: Al-Muthanna Stadium; Referee: Ahmed Khalaf Juma

10 November 2021	Newroz (1)	0–0 (4–2 p)	Al-Naft (1)	Sulaymaniya
14:30 UTC+03:00				Stadium: Farmande Stadium; Referee: Shamil Tahseen

10 November 2021	Amanat Baghdad (1)	1–0	Suq Al-Shuyukh (2)	Baghdad
14:30 UTC+03:00	Karim 28'			Stadium: Amanat Baghdad Stadium; Referee: Hamid Ali

10 November 2021	Masafi Al-Junoob (2)	2–2 (5–4 p)	Al-Sinaa (1)	Basra
14:30 UTC+03:00	Mbapis 7'; Amer 18'		Goal	Stadium: Basra International Stadium; Referee: Muthanna Hussein

10 November 2021	Al-Quwa Al-Jawiya (1)	2–1	Naft Maysan (1)	Baghdad
14:30 UTC+03:00	Abbas 9'; Jabbar 45'		Saad 76'	Stadium: Al-Quwa Al-Jawiya Stadium; Referee: Mohammed Salman

10 November 2021	Erbil (1)	0–0 (4–3 p)	Al-Ramadi (2)	Erbil
17:00 UTC+03:00				Stadium: Franso Hariri Stadium; Referee: Salem Amer

11 November 2021	Karbala (2)	0–1	Al-Najaf (1)	Karbala
14:30 UTC+03:00			Ahmed 11'	Stadium: Karbala Stadium; Referee: Laith Farhan

11 November 2021	Al-Qasim (1)	1–0	Peshmerga Sulaymaniya (2)	Al-Kifl
14:30 UTC+03:00	Mohsin 70'			Stadium: Al-Kifl Stadium; Referee: Hamid Talib

11 November 2021	Al-Sulaikh (2)	1–1 (5–4 p)	Al-Jinsiya (2)	Baghdad
14:30 UTC+03:00	Raheem 1'; (penalty missed) 85'		Goal	Stadium: Al-Kashafa Stadium; Referee: Sajad Khalid

11 November 2021	Al-Kahrabaa (1)	1–0	Al-Dujail (3)	Baghdad
14:30 UTC+03:00	(pen.)			Stadium: Al-Taji Stadium; Referee: Mahdi Salah

11 November 2021	Al-Zawraa (1)	3–0	Al-Sinaat Al-Kahrabaiya (2)	Baghdad
14:30 UTC+03:00	Abdul-Amir 2'; Sanhaji 10'; Touil 66' (pen.)			Stadium: Al-Naft Stadium; Referee: Ahmed Kadhim

== Round of 16 ==
The round featured 13 teams from the Premier League (level 1) and 3 teams from First Division League (level 2).

4 December 2021	Al-Karkh (1)	2–1	Diyala (2)	Baghdad
14:00 UTC+03:00	Saad 20', 30'		Mohammed 42'	Stadium: Al-Saher Ahmed Radhi Stadium; Referee: Hamid Ali

4 December 2021	Al-Najaf (1)	0–2	Amanat Baghdad (1)	Najaf
14:00 UTC+03:00			Sabah 40'; Fadhil 68'	Stadium: Al-Najaf Stadium; Referee: Mohanad Manaf

4 December 2021	Erbil (1)	0–0 (4–3 p)	Al-Shorta (1)	Erbil
16:15 UTC+03:00				Stadium: Franso Hariri Stadium; Referee: Mustafa Muhanna
	Penalties
	Baez (penalty scored); Qaraman (penalty missed); Mansour (penalty scored); Castro (penalty scored); Serhan (penalty scored)		(penalty scored) Jaffal; (penalty scored) Ashour; (penalty missed) Ghalib; (penalty scored) Al-Mawas; (penalty missed) Abdul-Zahra

4 December 2021	Naft Al-Wasat (1)	1–1 (1–4 p)	Zakho (1)	Karbala
18:30 UTC+03:00	Mohammed 1'		C. Oliveira 90+5'	Stadium: Karbala International Stadium; Referee: Muntadher Ghazi
	Penalties
	Dakhil (penalty missed); Hanoon (penalty scored); Khalil (penalty missed)		(penalty scored) Esquerdinha; (penalty scored) C. Oliveira; (penalty scored) Cédric; (penalty scored) B. Oliveira

5 December 2021	Newroz (1)	0–2	Al-Kahrabaa (1)	Sulaymaniya
14:00 UTC+03:00			Salam 53'; Kareem 56'	Stadium: Sulaymaniya Stadium; Referee: Ayad Mzahim

5 December 2021	Al-Sulaikh (2)	1–2	Masafi Al-Junoob (2)	Baghdad
14:00 UTC+03:00				Stadium: Five Thousand Stadium; Referee: Ali Hussein Ali

5 December 2021	Al-Qasim (1)	0–1	Al-Zawraa (1)	Al-Kifl
14:00 UTC+03:00			Abdul-Amir 60'	Stadium: Al-Kifl Stadium; Referee: Salem Amer

5 December 2021	Naft Al-Basra (1)	1–1 (3–5 p)	Al-Quwa Al-Jawiya (1)	Basra
16:15 UTC+03:00	Malek 90' (pen.)		Jabbar 70' (pen.)	Stadium: Al-Fayhaa Stadium; Referee: Wathik Mohammed Al-Baag
	Penalties
	Ngombé (penalty scored); Abdul-Rahim (penalty scored); Youmbi (penalty scored); Ali (penalty missed)		(penalty scored) Ismail; (penalty scored) Moayad; (penalty scored) Ahmed; (penalty scored) Kadhim; (penalty scored) Bayesh

== Quarter-finals ==
The round featured 7 teams from the Premier League (level 1) and 1 team from First Division League (level 2).

12 June 2022	Al-Kahrabaa (1)	0–0 (4–2 p)	Amanat Baghdad (1)	Baghdad
16:45 UTC+03:00				Stadium: Al-Taji Stadium
	Penalties
	Abdul-Amir (penalty scored); Mhaisen (penalty missed); Ibrahim (penalty scored); Khalid (penalty scored); Khalil (penalty scored)		(penalty scored) Yassin; (penalty missed) Karim; (penalty missed) Arzeij; (penalty scored) Hameed

13 June 2022	Al-Karkh (1)	1–1 (5–3 p)	Erbil (1)	Baghdad
16:45 UTC+03:00	Obeis 13'		Baez 65' (pen.)	Stadium: Al-Saher Ahmed Radhi Stadium; Referee: Wathik Mohammed Al-Baag
	Penalties
	Nouri (penalty scored); Waleed (penalty scored); Fawzi (penalty scored); Hassan (penalty scored); Hmeisheh (penalty scored)		(penalty scored) Mansour; (penalty scored) Saleh; (penalty missed) Al-Ahmad; (penalty scored) Baez

13 June 2022	Zakho (1)	2–0	Masafi Al-Junoob (2)	Zakho
16:45 UTC+03:00	Cédric 30', 75'			Stadium: Zakho International Stadium

13 June 2022	Al-Zawraa (1)	2–1	Al-Quwa Al-Jawiya (1)	Baghdad
20:00 UTC+03:00	Jabbar 65' (o.g.); Fayyadh 88'		Hadi 7'	Stadium: Al-Shaab Stadium; Referee: Mohammed Salman

== Semi-finals ==
All remaining teams are from the Premier League (level 1).

28 June 2022	Al-Kahrabaa	2–0	Zakho	Najaf
19:00 UTC+03:00	Mahmoud 47'; Ali 90+4'			Stadium: Al-Najaf International Stadium

28 June 2022	Al-Zawraa	0–1	Al-Karkh	Baghdad
22:00 UTC+03:00			Houbeib 19' (o.g.)	Stadium: Al-Shaab Stadium

== Final ==
16 July 2022
20:00 UTC+03:00

Al-Karkh	2–1	Al-Kahrabaa
Obeis 54'; Abdulkareem 60'		Abdul-Amir 15'

Al-Madina Stadium, Baghdad
Referee: Mohanad Qasim

Iraq FA Cup
2021–22 winner
Al-Karkh
1st title
