= 2023–24 Iraqi First Division League =

Iraqi First Division League
- Season: 2023–24
- Dates: 29 December 2022 – April 2024
- Champions: Al-Mosul
- Promoted: Al-Mosul, Al-Kadhimiya

The 2023–24 Iraqi First Division League is the 50th season of the Iraqi First Division League, the third tier in the Iraqi football league system since its establishment in 1974, and the first under its new name. The number of clubs in the league have varied throughout history for various reasons. in this season, the number of clubs is 26 divided into three groups, with 10 clubs relegated from the Iraqi First Division League to the Second Division League, and two teams promoted to the Premier Division League next season. The teams will be distributed among 3 groups according to the geographical area, competing among them for the promotion of two teams from each group, then the 6 qualifying teams will be divided into two groups that will play among themselves in a home-and-away system, while the mechanism of relegation will be the relegation of 10 teams, with 3 teams from each group, and the tenth relegated team, Its position will be decided by playing a home-and-away match with the sixth-place finishers from the first and second groups. The season is scheduled to start on 29 December 2023.

== Teams ==
A total of 26 teams are contesting the league, including 23 sides from the 2022–23 season and the 4 relegated sides from the Iraqi Premier Division League, The teams promoted from the Iraqi Second Division League were neglected, because of the recent changes necessary to adjustment to having 26 teams possible this season. Indeed, Al-Hawija, Al-Jinsiya, Al-Samawa and Al-Sulaikh were relegated from the Premier Division League in the previous season, but Al-Jinsiya was also considered to have withdrawn from the league after the Ministry of Interior officially dissolved them.

The teams were divided into three groups, and the draw was held on December 13, 2023, and it was decided that the championship will start on December 29, 2023.

=== 2023–24 season ===
Locations of the 2023–24 Iraqi First Division League teams

Team	Manager	Location	Stadium	Capacity
Al-Alam	(Iraq) Amin Abbas	Saladin	Al-Alam Stadium	5,000
Al-Amwaj Al-Mosuli	(Iraq) Ridhwan Mohammed	Nineveh	Ahmed Radhi Stadium	5,000
Al Bdeir	(Iraq) Hassan Faleh Al-Abedi	Al-Qādisiyyah	Al Bdeir Stadium	5,000
Al-Furat	(Iraq) Abdul Yemma Warwar	Dhi Qar	Suq Al-Shuyukh Stadium	5,000
Al-Hawija	(Iraq) Mohammed Shathar	Kirkuk	Al-Hawija Stadium	5,000
Al-Hashd Al-Shaabi	(Iraq) Azhar Taher	Baghdad	Al-Saher Ahmed Radhi Stadium	5,150
Al-Jawhara	(Iraq) Jassim Jaber Al-Awadi	Babil	Al-Hashimiya Stadium	5,000
Al-Kadhimiya	(Iraq) Ali Bahjat	Baghdad	Al-Kadhimiya Stadium	5,000
Al-Khalis	(Iraq) Nasser Kamel Mohammed	Diyala	Al-Khalis Stadium	5,000
Al-Khidhir	(Iraq) Mohammed Junaih	Muthanna	Al-Khidhir Olympic Stadium	7,500
Al-Khutoot Al-Jawiya	(Iraq) Ali Abboud	Baghdad	Al-Ameriya Stadium	5,000
Al-Kifl	(Iraq) Nadhim Hussein	Babil	Al-Kifl Stadium	8,000
Al-Kut	(Iraq) Haider Ibrahim	Wasit	Al-Kut Olympic Stadium	20,000
Al-Mosul	(Iraq) Ali Hilal	Nineveh	Mosul University Stadium	20,000
Al-Numaniya	(Iraq) Salah Thamir Ibrahim	Wasit	Al-Azeeziya Stadium	5,000
Al-Qurna	(Iraq) Ali Najem	Basra	Al-Qurna Stadium	7,000
Al-Sadeq	(Iraq) Wissam Hamza	Basra	Al-Sadeq Stadium	5,000
Al-Samawa	(Iraq) Falah Hadi Hussein	Muthanna	Al-Samawah Stadium	15,000
Al-Sufiya	(Iraq) Shaker Mohammed Sabbar	Al-Anbar	Al-Sufiya Stadium	5,000
Al-Sulaikh	(Iraq) Shaker Abed Ali	Baghdad	Al-Sulaikh Stadium	5,000
Al-Suwaira	(Iraq) Nazar Marah	Wasit	Al-Al-Suwaira Stadium	10,000
Al-Taji	(Iraq) Thiyab Nuhair	Baghdad	Al-Taji Stadium	5,000
Ararat	(Iraq) Safeen Hamad Amin	Erbil	Ararat Stadium	5,000
Baladiyat Al-Mosul	(Iraq) Tariq Tuaima	Nineveh	Baladiyat Al-Mosul Stadium	5,000
Jadidat Al-Shatt	(Iraq) Hassan Abdul-Hadi	Diyala	Jadidat Al-Shatt Stadium	5,000
Naft Al-Shamal	(Iraq) Ahmed Habib	Kirkuk	Khak Stadium	5,000

== First round ==
=== Group 1 ===
Pos	Team	Pld	W	D	L	GF	GA	GD	Pts	Qualification or relegation
1	Al-Hashd Al-Shaabi	5	5	0	0	12	4	+8	15	Qualification to the Second round
2	Al-Taji	5	3	2	0	13	6	+7	11	Qualification to the Second round
3	Al-Kadhimiya	5	3	1	1	7	2	+5	10	
4	Al-Khidhir	6	2	0	4	11	10	+1	6	
5	Al-Sulaikh	6	2	0	4	9	11	−2	6	
6	Al-Amwaj Al-Mosuli	6	1	3	2	8	10	−2	6	Qualification for the "Play-out" round
7	Al-Alam	5	2	0	3	6	8	−2	6	Relegation to Iraqi Second Division League
8	Al-Khutoot Al-Jawiya	5	1	1	3	4	9	−5	4	Relegation to Iraqi Second Division League
9	Al Bdeir	5	1	1	3	5	15	−10	4	Relegation to Iraqi Second Division League

Updated to match(es) played on 30 January 2024. Source: IFA official website
Rules for classification: 1) points; 2) head-to-head points; 3) head-to-head goal difference; 4) goal difference; 5) number of wins; 6) number of goals scored.

==== Results ====
Home \ Away	ALA	AMW	BDE	HSD	KAD	KHI	KHU	SUL	TAJ
Al-Alam	—			0–1		4–3		1–0	
Al-Amwaj Al-Mosuli	2–1	—						1–2	1–1
Al Bdeir		1–1	—				2–1		
Al-Hashd Al-Shaabi		4–2	2–0	—	1–0				
Al-Kadhimiya	2–0	1–1			—		3–0		
Al-Khidhir			4–0		0–1	—	2–0		
Al-Khutoot Al-Jawiya							—	2–1	1–1
Al-Sulaikh				2–4		3–1		—	1–2
Al-Taji			7–2			2–1			—

Updated to match(es) played on 30 January 2024. Source: IFA official website
Legend: Blue = home team win; Yellow = draw; Red = away team win.

=== Group 2 ===
Pos	Team	Pld	W	D	L	GF	GA	GD	Pts	Qualification or relegation
1	Al-Furat	5	4	1	0	8	2	+6	13	Qualification to the Second round
2	Al-Sadeq	6	3	2	1	15	7	+8	11	Qualification to the Second round
3	Al-Kifl	5	3	1	1	7	4	+3	10	
4	Al-Jawhara	6	2	3	1	11	9	+2	9	
5	Al-Qurna	5	1	3	1	2	2	0	6	
6	Al-Numaniya	5	1	1	3	5	8	−3	4	Qualification for the "Play-out" round
7	Al-Suwaira	5	1	1	3	6	9	−3	4	Relegation to Iraqi Second Division League
8	Al-Samawa	5	0	3	2	6	7	−1	3	Relegation to Iraqi Second Division League
9	Al-Kut	6	0	3	3	2	11	−9	3	Relegation to Iraqi Second Division League

Updated to match(es) played on 30 January 2024. Source: IFA official website
Rules for classification: 1) points; 2) head-to-head points; 3) head-to-head goal difference; 4) goal difference; 5) number of wins; 6) number of goals scored.

==== Results ====
Home \ Away	FUR	JAW	KIF	KUT	NUM	QUR	SAD	SAM	SUW
Al-Furat	—					1–0	4–1		
Al-Jawhara		—				1–1	2–2	3–3	
Al-Kifl	1–1	2–1	—						
Al-Kut	0–1		0–2	—	2–2				
Al-Numaniya	0–1	0–2			—			2–1	
Al-Qurna			1–0	0–0		—			
Al-Sadeq				6–0		0–0	—		3–0
Al-Samawa				0–0			1–3	—	1–1
Al-Suwaira		1–2	1–2		3–1				—

Updated to match(es) played on 30 January 2024. Source: IFA official website
Legend: Blue = home team win; Yellow = draw; Red = away team win.

=== Group 3 ===
Pos	Team	Pld	W	D	L	GF	GA	GD	Pts	Qualification or relegation
1	Al-Sufiya	5	3	2	0	10	4	+6	11	Qualification to the Second round
2	Naft Al-Shamal	5	3	2	0	8	4	+4	11	Qualification to the Second round
3	Al-Mosul	6	3	2	1	8	6	+2	11	
4	Baladiyat Al-Mosul	5	2	2	1	3	3	0	8	
5	Al-Hawija	5	1	1	3	9	11	−2	4	
6	Jadidat Al-Shatt	5	0	2	3	2	6	−4	2	Relegation to Iraqi Second Division League
7	Al-Khalis	5	0	1	4	3	9	−6	1	Relegation to Iraqi Second Division League
8	Ararat (Note: Ararat withdrew from the league.)	0	0	0	0	0	0	0	0	Relegation to Iraqi Second Division League

Updated to match(es) played on 30 January 2024. Source: IFA official website
Rules for classification: 1) points; 2) head-to-head points; 3) head-to-head goal difference; 4) goal difference; 5) number of wins; 6) number of goals scored.

==== Results ====
Home \ Away	HAW	KHA	MOS	SUF	ARA	BAL	JAD	NAF
Al-Hawija	—		2–3		—		1–1	1–3
Al-Khalis	2–5	—		0–0	—	0–1		
Al-Mosul		2–1	—		—	0–0	1–0	1–1
Al-Sufiya			2–1	—	—			
Ararat	—	—	—	—	—	—	—	—
Baladiyat Al-Mosul	2–0			0–3	—	—	0–0	
Jadidat Al-Shatt				1–3	—		—	0–1
Naft Al-Shamal		1–0		2–2	—			—

Updated to match(es) played on 30 January 2024. Source: IFA official website
Legend: Blue = home team win; Yellow = draw; Red = away team win.

== Final game ==
Al-Mosul	1–1	Al-Kadhimiya
Penalties
	6–4

Al-Taji Stadium, Baghdad

Iraqi First Division League
2023–24 winner
Al-Mosul
