= 2023 Iraqi Republic Championship =

Football tournament in Iraq

بطولة الجمهورية

Tournament details
- Host country: Iraq
- City: All 18 provinces
- Dates: 7 August – 27 September
- Teams: 19

Final positions
- Champions: Salahaddin XI
- Runners-up: Baghdad Karkh XI

Tournament statistics
- Matches played: 45
- Goals scored: 140 (3.11 per match)

The 2023 Iraqi Republic Championship was a newly returned friendly tournament organised by the Iraq Football Association. All 18 governorates of Iraq were represented in this tournament. The tournament started in August 2023, during the off-season of the Iraqi Premier League. This was the tournament's first edition in over 30 years. Salahaddin XI beat Baghdad Karkh XI in the final on 27 September to win the tournament.

== Format ==
All 18 provinces of Iraq were represented in the tournament. Baghdad was represented by two teams from Karkh and Rusafa, the two sides of Baghdad city separated by the Tigris River. Each team, governed by the sub-federation in that province, formed a select team to compete and appointed both the coaching and administrative staff. The coaches then called up players, who play for the province that they are originally from.

Iraqi Republic Championship
Northern Region	Western Region	Baghdad Region	Middle Euphrates Region	Southern Region
Duhok XI Erbil XI Sulaymaniya XI Kirkuk XI	Nineveh XI Salahaddin XI Diyala XI Anbar XI	Baghdad Karkh XI Baghdad Rusafa XI	Karbala XI Babil XI Najaf XI Qadisiya XI Muthanna XI	Wasit XI Dhi Qar XI Maysan XI Basra XI

Each team played at the following stadiums:

Stadiums
Team/Province	Stadium
Duhok XI	Duhok Stadium
Erbil XI	Franso Hariri Stadium
Sulaymaniya XI	Sulaymaniya Stadium
Kirkuk XI	Kirkuk Olympic Stadium
Nineveh XI	Al-Amwaj Al-Mosuli Stadium
Salahaddin XI	Tikrit University Stadium
Diyala XI	Baquba Stadium
Anbar XI	Al-Sufiya Stadium
Baghdad Karkh XI	Al-Zawraa Stadium
Baghdad Rusafa XI	Al-Shaab Stadium
Karbala XI	Karbala Local Administrative Stadium
Babil XI	Al-Kifl Stadium
Najaf XI	Al-Najaf Stadium
Qadisiya XI	Al-Diwaniya Stadium
Muthanna XI	Al-Samawa Stadium
Wasit XI	Al-Kut Olympic Stadium
Dhi Qar XI	Suq Al-Shuyukh Stadium/Al-Shatra Stadium
Maysan XI	Al-Maimouna Stadium
Basra XI	Al-Minaa Olympic Stadium (secondary pitch)

Each team initially played against other teams within their own region as qualifiers for the knockout stages. The top two teams from each of the four regions qualified for the next round, joining the Karkh and Rusafa teams in the Baghdad region to make up the 10 teams in the next phase. They were divided into two groups, and the top of each group played against each other in the final of the tournament.

Tie-breakers of groups relied on goals scored rather than goal difference to encourage offensive play in order to make the football played at the tournament more appealing.

== Regional stage ==
=== Northern Region ===
Pos	Team	Pld	W	D	L	GF	GA	GD	Pts	Qualification
1	Kirkuk XI	3	1	2	0	6	2	+4	5	Second stage
2	Erbil XI	3	1	2	0	6	3	+3	5	Second stage
3	Sulaymaniya XI	3	1	2	0	5	2	+3	5	
4	Duhok XI	3	0	0	3	1	11	−10	0	

Source: Kooora
Rules for classification: 1) points; 2) number of goals scored; 3) goal difference.

11 August 2023 GS MD1	Sulaymaniya XI	1–1	Kirkuk XI	Sulaymaniya
16:30 UTC+3	24'		Yassin 21'	Stadium: Zanko Stadium; Referee: Wmeedh Mahmoud

11 August 2023 GS MD1	Duhok XI	1–4	Erbil XI	Duhok
16:30 UTC+3	31'		45+1'; 55' (pen.); 79'; 83'	Stadium: Duhok Stadium; Referee: Ayad Zahim

16 August 2023 GS MD2	Erbil XI	1–1	Sulaymaniya XI	Erbil
16:45 UTC+3				Stadium: Franso Hariri Stadium

16 August 2023 GS MD2	Kirkuk XI	4–0	Duhok XI	Kirkuk
16:45 UTC+3	Hussein; Mohammed 39'; Nashat 73'			Stadium: Kirkuk Olympic Stadium

21 August 2023 GS MD3	Sulaymaniya XI	3–0 (w/o)	Duhok XI	Sulaymaniya
16:45 UTC+3				Stadium: Sulaymaniya Stadium

21 August 2023 GS MD3	Erbil XI	1–1	Kirkuk XI	Erbil
16:45 UTC+3	90+6'		Yassin 58'	Stadium: Franso Hariri Stadium

=== Western Region ===
Pos	Team	Pld	W	D	L	GF	GA	GD	Pts	Qualification
1	Salahaddin XI	3	2	1	0	12	5	+7	7	Second stage
2	Nineveh XI	3	2	1	0	4	1	+3	7	Second stage
3	Anbar XI	3	1	0	2	7	8	−1	3	
4	Diyala XI	3	0	0	3	2	11	−9	0	

Source: Kooora
Rules for classification: 1) points; 2) number of goals scored; 3) goal difference.

10 August 2023 GS MD1	Anbar XI	4–1	Diyala XI	Ramadi
17:00 UTC+3	(pen.)		Mahmoud	Stadium: Al-Sufiya Stadium; Referee: Jamal Abdul-Ridha

10 August 2023 GS MD1	Salahaddin XI	1–1	Nineveh XI	Tikrit
17:00 UTC+3	Naji 28'		Hamad 90+4'	Stadium: Tikrit University Stadium

14 August 2023 GS MD2	Diyala XI	1–5	Salahaddin XI	Baquba
17:00 UTC+3	Mahmoud 36'		Adnan 17'; Ali 26'; Jadallah 69'; Amer 90+2'; Qahtan 90+4'	Stadium: Baquba Stadium; Referee: Twana Othman

14 August 2023 GS MD2	Nineveh XI	1–0	Anbar XI	Mosul
17:00 UTC+3	Mohammed			Stadium: Al-Amwaj Al-Mosuli Stadium

18 August 2023 GS MD3	Anbar XI	3–6	Salahaddin XI	Ramadi
17:00 UTC+3			Naji; Younis (pen.); Rmeidh; Jadallah	Stadium: Al-Sufiya Stadium

18 August 2023 GS MD3	Diyala XI	0–2	Nineveh XI	Baquba
17:00 UTC+3				Stadium: Baquba Stadium

=== Middle Euphrates Region ===
Pos	Team	Pld	W	D	L	GF	GA	GD	Pts	Qualification
1	Karbala XI	4	3	0	1	8	4	+4	9	Second stage
2	Najaf XI	4	2	1	1	6	5	+1	7	Second stage
3	Qadisiya XI	4	1	1	2	6	8	−2	4	
4	Babil XI	4	1	1	2	5	7	−2	4	
5	Muthanna XI	4	0	3	1	2	3	−1	3	

Source: Kooora
Rules for classification: 1) points; 2) number of goals scored; 3) goal difference.

7 August 2023 GS MD1	Muthanna XI	0–0	Najaf XI	Samawa
17:00 UTC+3				Stadium: Al-Samawa Stadium; Referee: Hayder Adwan

7 August 2023 GS MD1	Qadisiya XI	0–2	Karbala XI	Afak
17:00 UTC+3			Kareem 14'; Sabah 70'	Stadium: Afak Stadium; Referee: Sajjad Khalid

11 August 2023 GS MD2	Babil XI	0–0	Muthanna XI	Al-Kifl
17:00 UTC+3				Stadium: Al-Kifl Stadium

11 August 2023 GS MD2	Najaf XI	3–1	Qadisiya XI	Najaf
17:00 UTC+3	Hassan 18'; Hameed 35'; Qasim			Stadium: Al-Najaf Stadium

15 August 2023 GS MD3	Karbala XI	3–1	Najaf XI	Karbala
17:00 UTC+3	Jebur 8' 21'; Jabbar 51'		61'	Stadium: Karbala Local Administrative Stadium

15 August 2023 GS MD3	Qadisiya XI	3–1	Babil XI	Al-Diwaniya
17:00 UTC+3	Kadhim; Jabbar		Yaseen	Stadium: Al-Diwaniya Stadium

19 August 2023 GS MD4	Muthanna XI	2–2	Qadisiya XI	Samawa
17:00 UTC+3				Stadium: Al-Samawa Stadium

19 August 2023 GS MD4	Babil XI	3–2	Karbala XI	Al-Kifl
17:00 UTC+3	Saleh; Kassad		Waleed; Jabbar	Stadium: Al-Kifl Stadium

23 August 2023 GS MD5	Karbala XI	1–0	Muthanna XI	Karbala
17:00 UTC+3	Sabah			Stadium: Karbala Local Administrative Stadium

23 August 2023 GS MD5	Najaf XI	2–1	Babil XI	Najaf
17:00 UTC+3	Hameed 18'; 70'		Kassad 1'	Stadium: Al-Najaf Stadium

=== Southern Region ===
Pos	Team	Pld	W	D	L	GF	GA	GD	Pts	Qualification
1	Wasit XI	3	3	0	0	8	2	+6	9	Second stage
2	Maysan XI	3	2	0	1	6	4	+2	6	Second stage
3	Basra XI	3	1	0	2	7	9	−2	3	
4	Dhi Qar XI	3	0	0	3	2	8	−6	0	

Source: Kooora
Rules for classification: 1) points; 2) number of goals scored; 3) goal difference.

10 August 2023 GS MD1	Dhi Qar XI	1–2	Wasit XI	Suq Al-Shuyukh
17:00 UTC+3	Fayyadh (pen.)		Goal	Stadium: Suq Al-Shuyukh Stadium; Referee: Hamid Ali

10 August 2023 GS MD1	Maysan XI	4–2	Basra XI	Amara
17:00 UTC+3	Qasim; Saad; Dahsh; Hussein		Jumaa; Abdul-Wahid 34'	Stadium: Al-Maimouna Stadium; Referee: Alaa Khalil

15 August 2023 GS MD2	Wasit XI	2–0	Maysan XI	Kut
17:00 UTC+3				Stadium: Al-Kut Olympic Stadium

16 August 2023 GS MD2	Basra XI	4–1	Dhi Qar XI	Basra
17:00 UTC+3	Abdul-Raheem 12'		Naeem	Stadium: Al-Minaa Olympic Stadium (secondary pitch)

20 August 2023 GS MD3	Dhi Qar XI	0–2	Maysan XI	Al-Shatra
17:00 UTC+3			Hussein; Fadhil	Stadium: Al-Shatra Stadium

20 August 2023 GS MD3	Basra XI	1–4	Wasit XI	Basra
17:00 UTC+3	Hadi			Stadium: Al-Minaa Olympic Stadium (secondary pitch)

== Second stage ==
=== Qualified Teams ===
Iraqi Republic Championship
Northern Region	Western Region	Baghdad Region	Middle Euphrates Region	Southern Region
Kirkuk XI Erbil XI	Salahaddin XI Nineveh XI	Baghdad Karkh XI (bye) Baghdad Rusafa XI (bye)	Karbala XI Najaf XI	Wasit XI Maysan XI

=== Group 1 ===
Pos	Team	Pld	W	D	L	GF	GA	GD	Pts	Qualification
1	Salahaddin XI	4	3	0	1	9	4	+5	9	Final
2	Karbala XI	4	2	1	1	8	5	+3	7	
3	Baghdad Rusafa XI	4	2	1	1	3	4	−1	7	
4	Erbil XI (H)	4	1	1	2	5	7	−2	4	
5	Maysan XI	4	0	1	3	1	6	−5	1	

Source: Kooora
Rules for classification: 1) points; 2) number of goals scored; 3) goal difference.
(H) Hosts

15 September 2023 SR MD1	Karbala XI	3–0	Baghdad Rusafa XI	Erbil
15:30 UTC+3				Stadium: Al-Shamal Stadium

15 September 2023 SR MD1	Salahaddin XI	2–1	Erbil XI	Erbil
15:30 UTC+3				Stadium: Al-Shamal Stadium

17 September 2023 SR MD2	Erbil XI	1–1	Baghdad Rusafa XI	Erbil

17 September 2023 SR MD2	Karbala XI	0–0	Maysan XI	Erbil

19 September 2023 SR MD3	Baghdad Rusafa XI	1–0	Salahaddin XI	Erbil
16:45 UTC+3				Stadium: Ararat Stadium

19 September 2023 SR MD3	Erbil XI	2–1	Maysan XI	Erbil
16:45 UTC+3				Stadium: Brayati Stadium

21 September 2023 SR MD4	Maysan XI	0–3	Salahaddin XI	Erbil

21 September 2023 SR MD4	Karbala XI	3–1	Erbil XI	Erbil

23 September 2023 SR MD5	Salahaddin XI	4–2	Karbala XI	Erbil

23 September 2023 SR MD5	Maysan XI	0–1	Baghdad Rusafa XI	Erbil

=== Group 2 ===
Pos	Team	Pld	W	D	L	GF	GA	GD	Pts	Qualification
1	Baghdad Karkh XI	3	2	0	1	7	5	+2	6	Final
2	Kirkuk XI (H)	3	2	0	1	4	3	+1	6	
3	Nineveh XI	3	1	1	1	4	4	0	4	
4	Wasit XI	3	0	1	2	3	6	−3	1	
5	Najaf XI (Note: Najaf XI withdrew from the tournament due to a lack of available players.)	0	0	0	0	0	0	0	0	Withdrew

Source: Kooora
Rules for classification: 1) points; 2) number of goals scored; 3) goal difference.
(H) Hosts
Notes:

16 September 2023 SR MD1	Wasit XI	2–4	Baghdad Karkh XI	Kirkuk
15:30 UTC+3				Stadium: Ghaz Al-Shamal Stadium

16 September 2023 SR MD1	Kirkuk XI	2–1	Nineveh XI	Kirkuk
15:30 UTC+3				Stadium: Naft Al-Shamal Stadium

19 September 2023 SR MD2	Nineveh XI	0–0	Wasit XI	Kirkuk
15:30 UTC+3				Stadium: Ghaz Al-Shamal Stadium

19 September 2023 SR MD2	Baghdad Karkh XI	1–0	Kirkuk XI	Kirkuk
15:30 UTC+3				Stadium: Naft Al-Shamal Stadium

22 September 2023 SR MD3	Nineveh XI	3–2	Baghdad Karkh XI	Kirkuk
15:30 UTC+3				Stadium: Ghaz Al-Shamal Stadium

22 September 2023 SR MD3	Wasit XI	1–2	Kirkuk XI	Kirkuk
15:30 UTC+3				Stadium: Naft Al-Shamal Stadium

== Final ==
27 September 2023
15:00 UTC+3

Salahaddin XI	2–1	Baghdad Karkh XI

Naft Al-Shamal Stadium, Kirkuk

Iraqi Republic Championship
2023 winner
Salahaddin XI
