= 2026–27 Iraqi Premier Division League =

Iraqi Premier Division League
- Season: 2026–27

The 2026–27 Iraqi Premier Division League will be the 53rd season of the Iraqi Premier Division League, the second tier of the Iraqi football league system since its establishment in 1974, and the fourth under its current name.

== Teams ==
=== Team changes ===
The following teams have changed division since the 2025–26 season:

Promoted from the Iraqi First Division League

- Masafi Al-Shamal
- Al-Shatra

Relegated from the Iraq Stars League

- Amanat Baghdad
- Al-Najaf
- Al-Qasim

Promoted to the Iraq Stars League

- Al-Jolan
- Ghaz Al-Shamal
- Karbala

Relegated to the Iraqi First Division League

- Afak
- Al-Bahri

== League table ==
Pos	Team	Pld	W	D	L	GF	GA	GD	Pts	Promotion, qualification or relegation
1	Al-Etisalat	0	0	0	0	0	0	0	0	Promotion to the Iraq Stars League
2	Al-Fahad	0	0	0	0	0	0	0	0	Promotion to the Iraq Stars League
3	Al-Hashd Al-Shaabi	0	0	0	0	0	0	0	0	
4	Al-Hudood	0	0	0	0	0	0	0	0	
5	Al-Hussein	0	0	0	0	0	0	0	0	
6	Al-Jaish	0	0	0	0	0	0	0	0	
7	Al-Kadhimiya	0	0	0	0	0	0	0	0	
8	Al-Najaf	0	0	0	0	0	0	0	0	
9	Al-Nasiriya	0	0	0	0	0	0	0	0	
10	Al-Qasim	0	0	0	0	0	0	0	0	
11	Al-Ramadi	0	0	0	0	0	0	0	0	
12	Al-Shatra	0	0	0	0	0	0	0	0	
13	Amanat Baghdad	0	0	0	0	0	0	0	0	
14	Masafi Al-Junoob	0	0	0	0	0	0	0	0	
15	Masafi Al-Shamal	0	0	0	0	0	0	0	0	
16	Masafi Al-Wasat	0	0	0	0	0	0	0	0	
17	Maysan	0	0	0	0	0	0	0	0	
18	Naft Al-Basra	0	0	0	0	0	0	0	0	Qualification for the relegation play-off
19	Naft Al-Wasat	0	0	0	0	0	0	0	0	Relegation to the Iraqi First Division League
20	Peshmerga Sulaymaniya	0	0	0	0	0	0	0	0	Relegation to the Iraqi First Division League

Source: SofaScore
Rules for classification: 1) points; 2) goal difference; 3) number of goals scored; 4) head-to-head points; 5) head-to-head goal difference; 6) head-to-head number of goals scored (if more than two teams are tied); 7) number of wins; 8) number of red cards; 9) number of yellow cards; 10) drawing of lots.

== Relegation play-off ==
The 18th-placed team competes in a two-legged play-off with the 3rd-placed team from the First Division League for a place in next season's Premier Division League.

--:-- UTC+3

v

--:-- UTC+3

v
