= Iraq Football Association =

Governing body of football in Iraq

AFC
- Short name: IFA
- Founded: 8 October 1948; 78 years ago
- Headquarters: Zayouna, Baghdad, Iraq
- FIFA affiliation: 1950
- AFC affiliation: 1970
- WAFF affiliation: 2001 (founding member)
- President: Younis Mahmoud
- Vice-President: Sarmad Abdelilah (1st); Mohammed Nasser Shakroun (2nd)
- Website: ifa.iq

The Iraq Football Association (IFA) (Arabic: الاتحاد العراقي لكرة القدم, romanized: Al-Ittiḥād al-ʻIrāqī li-Kurat al-Qadam) is the governing body of football in Iraq, controlling the Iraqi national team and the Iraqi football league system. The Iraqi Football Association was founded in 1948 and has been a member of FIFA since 1950, the Asian Football Confederation since 1970, and the Sub-confederation regional body West Asian Football Federation since 2001. Iraq is also part of the Union of Arab Football Associations (founded in 1974) and the Gulf Football Federation (founded in 2016). The Iraqi team is commonly known as Usood Al-Rafidain (Arabic: أسود الرافدين), which literally means Lions of Mesopotamia.

== History ==
The Iraq Football Association (Ittihad Al-Iraqi Le-Korat Al-Kadem) was formed on October 8, 1948, and was the third sports union to be founded in Iraq after the Track and Field Athletics and the Basketball Federations. The two unions took part at the 1948 Olympic Games in London, held from July 29 to August 14, however the IFA had not been founded, so no football team took part in the Olympics. It was during the Olympics that the idea of a football association in Iraq was put forward. During the 1948 London Olympic Games, Iraq's basketball team lost every game by an average of 104 points per game. They scored an average of 23.5 points per game. The team included Iraq's first ever-national football captain Wadud Khalil and another member of Iraq's first ever-national squad in 1951, the outside right Salih Faraj.

== First administration ==
The first logo of the Iraq Football Association in 1950.

The first Iraqi FA administration was headed by President Obaid Abdullah Al-Mudhayfi and Saadi Jassim as general secretary, with its headquarters in the Sheikh Omar district in Baghdad. The IFA was an association of 14 teams from all over Iraq, they included the Al-Nadi Al-Olympi Al-Malaki (‘Royal Olympic Club’), Al-Haras Al-Malaki (‘Royal Guards’), Al-Quwa Al-Jawiya Al-Malakiya (‘Royal Air Force’), Madaris Al-Shorta (‘Police Schools’), Al-Kuliya Al-Askariya (‘Military College’), Dar Al-Mualimeen Alaliya (‘Highest Teacher's House’), Casuals Club, Al-Maarouf Al-Tarbiya (‘Physical Education’), Kuliyat Al-Huqooq (‘College of Law’), Al-Quwa Al-Siyara (‘Armoured Cars’) from the capital Baghdad and four other teams Nadi Al-Minaa Al-Basri (Basra Port Club), Sharikat Naft Al-Basra (Basra Petroleum Company) from Basra and branches in the provinces of Mosul and Kirkuk.

== Controversies ==
The Iraqi youth national teams have been ejected from tournaments for fielding over-age players. In 1989, Iraq was banned for using over-age players in the U-20 World Championships in Saudi Arabia. That ban was extended when Iraq invaded Kuwait in August 1990.

== Competitions ==
The IFA organises several national competitions, including:

- Iraq Stars League
- Iraqi Premier Division League
- Iraqi First Division League
- Iraqi Second Division League
- Iraqi Third Division League
- Iraq FA Cup
- Iraqi Super Cup
- Iraqi Women's Football League

=== Current title holders ===
Competition	Year	Champions	Runners-up	Next edition
Senior football (men's)
Iraq Stars League	2025–26	Al-Quwa Al-Jawiya	Al-Shorta	2026–27
Iraqi Premier Division League	2025–26	Al-Jolan	Ghaz Al-Shamal	2026–27
Iraqi First Division League	2025–26	Masafi Al-Shamal	Al-Shatra	2026–27
Iraqi Second Division League	2025–26	Al-Sinaat Al-Harbiya	Akkad	2026–27
Iraqi Third Division League	2025–26	Akre	Al-Hindiya	2026–27
Iraq FA Cup	2024–25	Duhok	Zakho	2026–27
Iraqi Super Cup	2022	Al-Shorta	Al-Karkh	2026
Senior football (women's)
Iraqi Women's Football League	2023–24	Al-Quwa Al-Jawiya	Naft Al-Shamal	TBD

== Association information ==
As of 23 May 2026, the members of the Iraq Football Association leadership team are:

Position	Incumbent
President	(Iraq) Younis Mahmoud
First Vice President	(Iraq) Sarmad Abdelilah
Second Vice President	(Iraq) Mohammed Nasser Shakroun
General Secretary	(Iraq) Govand Abdul-Khaliq
Technical Director	(Spain) Carlos Rodríguez Díaz
Child Safeguarding Officer	(Iraq) Ibrahim Maroof Ahmed

Other members: Ahmed Al-Musawi, Ghalib Al-Zamili, Emad Yassin, Abdul-Razzaq Akram, Khalaf Jalal, Farqad Abdul-Karim, Kadhim Hamad, Mahmoud Ahmed, Sabah Qasim, Sabreen Hamed

== List of presidents of IFA ==
The following is a list of presidents of Iraq Football Association (IFA).

Presidency	President	Took office	Left office
1	Abdullah Al-Muthaifi	1948	1952
2	Akram Fahmi	1953	1954
3	Saadi Hussein Al-Douri	1954	1955
4	Ismail Mohammed	1955	1956
5	Hadi Abbas	1956	1959
6	Adeeb Najeeb	1959	1961
7	Adil Basheer	1961	1964
8	Fahad Juwad Al-Meera	1964	1968
–		1968	1976
9	Moayad Al-Badri	1976	1977
10	Hisham Atta	1977	1980
11	Soryan Tawfeeq	1980	1984
12	Sabah Mirza Mahmoud	1984	1985
13	Uday Hussein	1985	1988
14	Kareem Mahmoud Mulla	1988	1990
15	Uday Hussein	1990	2003
16	Ahmed Radhi	2003	2004
17	Hussein Saeed	2004	2011
18	Najeh Humoud	2011	2014
19	Abdul Khaliq Masood	2014	2020
20	Eyad Al Nadawi	2020	2021
21	Adnan Dirjal	2021	2026
22	Younis Mahmoud	2026	present

== See also ==
- Iraq national football team
- Iraqi football league system
- List of Iraqi football champions
