= Ali Bahjat =

Iraqi footballer (born 1992)

Personal information
- Full name: Ali Bahjat Fadhil
- Date of birth: 3 March 1992 (age 34)
- Place of birth: Baghdad, Iraq
- Height: 1.83 m (6 ft 0 in)
- Position: Centre back

Youth career
- –2010: Al-Kadhimiya

Senior career*
Years	Team	Apps	(Gls)
2010–2011	Al-Karkh		(3)
2011–2013	Duhok		(0)
2013–2015	Al-Shorta		(1)
2015–2016	Al-Minaa	10	(3)
2016–2021	Al-Quwa Al-Jawiya		(1)
2021–2022	Al-Naft		(0)
2022	Zakho	0	(0)
2022 - 2023	Al-Diwaniya		
2023	Al-Kadhimiya	3	(0)
Total		–	(8)

International career
2010–2011	Iraq U20	2	(0)
2012–2014	Iraq U23	4	(1)
2012–2018	Iraq	37	(0)
- * Club domestic league appearances and goals

Ali Bahjat Fadhil (Arabic: عَلِيّ بَهْجَت فَاضِل; born 3 March 1992) is a former Iraqi footballer who played as a defender. He is currently the manager of Al-Kadhimiya SC

A defender who could play both centrally and on the right, Bahjat was part of the Al-Quwa Al Jawiya side that won three AFC Cup trophies in a row, he had a long career in the Iraqi league, winning several titles and was capped by the Iraqi national team on 35 occasions. In his first season as a manager, Bahjat lead his hometown club Al-Kadhimiya SC to promotion out of the 3rd tier.

== Club career ==
Ali Bahjat was born in Baghdad, and started his career with local side Al-Kadhimiya, before moving to Iraqi Premier League side Al-Karkh in 2010.

Ahead of 2011–2012 season, Ali Bahjat moved to Kurdish side Duhok, continuing the trend of top Iraqi players moving to Kurdish clubs due to the more stable security situation in their cities compared to the turmoil in Baghdad. His team finished as runners up in the league that season, behind rivals Erbil Sc.

Following his tenure with Duhok, Bahjat returned to Baghdad, this time with Al-Shorta. He would spend two seasons with the club before being released in December 2015.

In December 2015 Bahjat joined Al Mina'a for the remainder of the 15-16 league season, where he took part in 10 matches for the club.

He would move back to Baghdad, and join Al-Quwa Al Jawiya the following season. He spend six years club, achieving a historic treble of Asian trophies after winning the AFC Cup in 2016,2017, and 2018. He missed parts of the 2018 campaign due to knee injury. He also won the Iraqi league in his first and last season with the club. He tested positive for COVID-19 in 2020.

Following his stint with Al Jawiya, he moved to another Baghdad side in Al Naft. He had a trouble-filled time with Al-Naft, the player survived an attempt of February 2022, after he was pursued by an unmarked vehicle which opened fire on his vehicle, but the player was able to escape. Then, the team did not pay his agreed upon wages, and refused to release him to Zakho unless he gives up his claim over the unpaid wages, which he refused, this his signing with Zakho was annulled.

In 2023, he joined Al Diwaniya but failed to help the team stave off relegation from the Iraqi Premier League.

He then returned to his boyhood club Al-Kadhimiya, where he played the last three matches of the season and retired from football.

== International career ==
On 11 September 2012 Bahjat made his debut against Japan in Saitama Stadium 2002, Saitama, Japan in the 2014 FIFA World Cup qualification, which it was ended 0–1 loss.

Bahjat was called up to the Iraqi squad taking part in the 21st Arabian Gulf Cup in 2013 where Iraq finished runners up following an extra time defeat to the United Arab Emirates in the final.

Bahjat was called up to the Iraqi squad taking part in the 22nd Arabian Gulf Cup in 2014, where Iraq had one of its worst ever participation in the tournament, finishing bottom of their group with one point.

Bahjat was called up to the Iraqi squad taking part in the 2015 Asian Cup, where Iraq reached the semi final, losing to South Korea, and then lost the third place match against the United Arab Emirates.

Bahjat was called up to the Iraqi squad taking part in the 23rd Arabian Gulf Cup in 2017 in which Iraq were knocked out of the semi finals against the United Arab Emirates.

Ali Bahjat finished his career with 35 matches for the national team.

== Managerial career ==
Following his retirement from playing, Bahjat started his managerial career in the same club where he started his playing career, Al-Kadhimiya. He led his team to promotion from the Iraqi first division in the first time of asking, in the 23-24 season. On 15 October Bahjat announced his resignation from the club "due to personal reasons"

== Honors ==
=== Club ===
Al-Quwa Al-Jawiya

- Iraqi Premier League: 2016–17, 2020–21
- Iraq FA Cup: 2020–21
- AFC Cup: 2016, 2017, 2018

=== International ===
Iraq U-23

- AFC U-22 Championship: 2013

Iraq National football team

- Arab Nations Cup Bronze medalist: 2012
- WAFF Championship runner-up: 2012
- Arabian Gulf Cup runner-up: 2013
- AFC Asian Cup fourth-place: 2015

=== Manager ===
Al-Kadhimiya SC

- Iraqi First Division League : Second Place (Promoted) 23-24
