= 2025–26 Iraqi Premier Division League =

Iraqi Premier Division League
- Season: 2025–26
- Dates: 2 October 2025 – 25 May 2026
- Champions: Al-Jolan (1st title)
- Promoted: Al-Jolan; Ghaz Al-Shamal; Karbala
- Relegated: Al-Bahri; Afak
- Matches: 380
- Goals: 816 (2.15 per match)

The 2025–26 Iraqi Premier Division League was the 52nd season of the Iraqi Premier Division League, the second tier of the Iraqi football league system since its establishment in 1974, and the third under its new name. The season began on 2 October 2025 and ended on 25 May 2026.

Al-Jolan were crowned champions for the first time, and were promoted to the Iraq Stars League alongside runners-up Ghaz Al-Shamal.

== League table ==
Pos	Team	Pld	W	D	L	GF	GA	GD	Pts	Promotion, qualification or relegation
1	Al-Jolan (C, P)	38	23	8	7	67	38	+29	77	Promotion to the Iraq Stars League
2	Ghaz Al-Shamal (P)	38	19	17	2	45	27	+18	74	Promotion to the Iraq Stars League
3	Al-Hudood	38	19	12	7	59	32	+27	69	Qualification for the play-out round
4	Karbala (O, P)	38	16	13	9	46	32	+14	61	Qualification for the play-out round
5	Al-Jaish	38	14	19	5	52	40	+12	61	
6	Al-Etisalat	38	13	12	13	49	47	+2	51	
7	Al-Nasiriya	38	12	15	11	46	45	+1	51	
8	Naft Al-Wasat	38	12	14	12	40	47	−7	50	
9	Al-Kadhimiya	38	13	11	14	42	45	−3	50	
10	Al-Ramadi	38	10	16	12	31	35	−4	46	
11	Al-Fahad	38	10	16	12	36	41	−5	46	
12	Masafi Al-Wasat	38	11	13	14	37	40	−3	46	
13	Peshmerga Sulaymaniya	38	11	12	15	36	35	+1	45	
14	Masafi Al-Junoob	38	10	14	14	39	39	0	44	
15	Al-Hussein	38	9	17	12	35	38	−3	44	
16	Naft Al-Basra	38	9	16	13	33	37	−4	43	
17	Maysan	38	9	13	16	29	38	−9	40	
18	Al-Hashd Al-Shaabi	38	7	18	13	31	42	−11	39	Qualification for the relegation play-off
19	Al-Bahri (R)	38	7	17	14	35	45	−10	38	Relegation to the Iraqi First Division League
20	Afak (R)	38	6	7	25	28	73	−45	25	Relegation to the Iraqi First Division League

Source: SofaScore
Rules for classification: 1) points; 2) head-to-head points; 3) head-to-head goal difference; 4) goal difference; 5) number of goals scored; 6) number of wins.
(C) Champions; (O) Play-off winners; (P) Promoted; (R) Relegated

== Promotion play-offs ==
=== Play-out round ===
The 3rd and 4th-placed teams compete in a play-off, with the winner advancing to the promotion play-off and the loser remaining in the Premier Division League.

If the scores are level after 90 minutes, 30 minutes of extra time are played. If the scores are still level after extra time, the 3rd-placed team advances to the promotion play-off due to their superior league position.

30 May 2026
19:00 UTC+3

Al-Hudood	0–1	Karbala

Sharar Haidar Stadium, Baghdad

=== Promotion play-off ===
The winner of the play-out round competes in a two-legged play-off with the 18th-placed team from the Iraq Stars League for a place in next season's Stars League. If the tie ends in a draw on aggregate, there is no extra time played and the game goes straight to a penalty shootout.

8 June 2026
18:30 UTC+3

Amanat Baghdad	0–1	Karbala

Diyala Stadium, Diyala
13 June 2026
18:30 UTC+3

Karbala	1–0	Amanat Baghdad

Karbala International Stadium, Karbala

Karbala won 2–0 on aggregate.

== Relegation play-off ==
The 18th-placed team competes in a two-legged play-off with the 3rd-placed team from the First Division League for a place in next season's Premier Division League.

7 June 2026
17:00 UTC+3

Al-Hashd Al-Shaabi	2–0	Al-Sufiya

Al-Naft Stadium, Baghdad
12 June 2026
16:00 UTC+3

Al-Sufiya	1–1	Al-Hashd Al-Shaabi

Al-Sufiya Stadium, Al-Anbar

Al-Hashd Al-Shaabi won 3–1 on aggregate.
