= Al-Salman SC =

Iraqi First Division League football club

- Full name: Al-Salman Sport Club
- Founded: 1995; 30 years ago
- Ground: Al-Salman Stadium
- Chairman: Bassim Fadhel
- Manager: Mohammed Salih
- League: Iraqi Third Division League
Home colours	Away colours

Al-Salman Sport Club (Arabic: نادي السلمان الرياضي) is an Iraqi football team based in Al-Muthanna, that plays in Iraqi Third Division League.

== Managerial history ==
- (Iraq) Mohammed Salih

== See also ==
- 2021–22 Iraq FA Cup
