= Al-Dujail SC =

Iraqi football club

- Full name: Al-Dujail Sport Club
- Founded: 1992; 33 years ago
- Ground: Al-Dujail Stadium
- Chairman: Saad Khazaal
- Manager: Ayoub Younes Al-Samarra'i
- League: Iraqi Third Division League
Home colours	Away colours

Al-Dujail Sport Club (Arabic: نادي الدجيل الرياضي), is an Iraqi football team based in Dujail, Saladin, that plays in Iraqi Third Division League.

== History ==
=== Suspension and resumption ===
In 1982, sporting activities in Dujail were suspended due to the Dujail Massacre. After the year 2003, after the invasion of Iraq, the club's activity resumed and various sports teams were established, including the football team.

== Managerial history ==
- (Iraq) Natiq Haddad
- (Iraq) Zahid Abboud
- (Iraq) Ayoub Younes

== See also ==
- 2021–22 Iraq FA Cup
