= Al-Jolan SC =

Iraqi football club

- Full name: Al-Jolan Football Club
- Founded: 2004; 22 years ago
- Ground: Al-Fallujah Stadium
- Capacity: 7,000
- Chairman: Jassim Al-Asal
- Manager: Anmar Salam
- League: Iraq Stars League
- 2025–26: Iraqi Premier Division League, 1st of 20 (promoted)
Home colours	Away colours

Al-Jolan Sport Club (Arabic: نادي الجولان الرياضي), is an Iraqi football team based in Fallujah, Al-Anbar, that plays in Iraq Stars League.

== History ==
The club was founded in 2004, and it is considered one of the most important clubs in Fallujah. It has teams in various sports, including football, basketball, volleyball, handball, table tennis, chess, taekwondo, kickboxing, swimming, bodybuilding, weightlifting, and track and field, some of which have won multiple championships.

In the 2025–26 season, the team, under the leadership of coach Anmar Salam, was able to win the Iraqi Premier Division League title and promoted to play in the Iraq Stars League (top tier) for the first time in its history.

== Managerial history ==
- (Iraq) Khalid Mohammed Sabbar
- (Iraq) Saadi Awad
- (Iraq) Amer Khamis
- (Iraq) Shukor Ali
- (Iraq) Haider Obeid
- (Iraq) Yasser Raad
- (Iraq) Ahmed Mnajed
- (Iraq) Hadi Mtanesh
- (Iraq) Ali Wahab
- (Iraq) Mustafa Karim
- (Iraq) Thair Jassam
- (Iraq) Samer Saeed
- (Iraq) Anmar Salam

== Players ==
=== First-team squad ===
As of 16 September 2026

Note: Flags indicate national team as defined under FIFA eligibility rules; some limited exceptions apply. Players may hold more than one non-FIFA nationality.

No.	Pos.	Nation	Player
1	GK	IRQ	Barakat Muneam
2	DF	IRQ	Mahmoud Khudhair
3	DF	IRQ	Hamza Adnan
5	MF	IRQ	Youssef Fawzi
7	FW	POR	Zé Gomes
8	MF	SEN	Mbaye Ly
9	FW	MTN	Hemeya Tanjy
10	FW	IRQ	Omar Abed Mijbas
11	MF	IRQ	Harith Dhiaa
12	MF	IRQ	Shihab Razzaq
14	DF	IRQ	Mohammed Jassim
15	MF	IRQ	Hussein Manthour
17	MF	MLI	Daouda Coulibaly

No.	Pos.	Nation	Player
18	DF	MAR	Anouar Tarkhatt
20	GK	IRQ	Mohammed Hameed
21	MF	IRQ	Karrar Ali Hamdan
27	MF	IRQ	Moammel Mahmoud
49	FW	IRQ	Nihad Mohammed
53	DF	IRQ	Alaa Mhawi
77	MF	IRQ	Mohammed Abdullah
88	DF	IRQ	Hassan Khaled
90	FW	SEN	Ibrahima Ndiaye
99	GK	IRQ	Mustafa Adhab
—	DF	IRQ	Mohammed Saeed
—	DF	IRQ	Ahmed Ibrahim

== Honours ==
- Iraqi Premier Division League (second tier)
  - Winners (1): 2025–26

== See also ==
- 2020–21 Iraq FA Cup
- 2021–22 Iraq FA Cup
- 2022–23 Iraq FA Cup
