= Qazaniya SC =

Iraqi football club

- Full name: Qazaniya Sport Club
- Founded: 2004; 21 years ago
- Ground: Qazaniya Stadium
- Chairman: Khalaf Jalal
- Manager: Ali Abdullah
- League: Iraqi Third Division League
Home colours	Away colours

Qazaniya Sport Club (Arabic: نادي قزانية الرياضي) is an Iraqi football team based in Balad Ruz, Diyala, that plays in Iraqi Third Division League.

== Managerial history ==
- (Iraq) Bassim Hussein
- (Iraq) Ali Abdullah

== See also ==
- 2020–21 Iraq FA Cup
- 2021–22 Iraq FA Cup
