= Musalla SC =

Iraqi football club

- Full name: Musalla Football Club
- Founded: 2003; 22 years ago
- Ground: Musalla Stadium
- Chairman: Ayad Qader Alo
- Manager: Sawash Qader
- League: Iraqi Third Division League
Home colours	Away colours

Musalla Sport Club (Arabic: نادي المصلى الرياضي), is an Iraqi football team based in Kirkuk, that plays in Iraqi Third Division League.

== Managerial history ==
- (Iraq) Sawash Qader

== See also ==
- 2020–21 Iraq FA Cup
- 2021–22 Iraq FA Cup
