= Al-Kadhimiya SC =

Iraqi football club

- Full name: Al-Kadhimiya Sports Club
- Founded: 1952; 74 years ago
- Ground: Al-Kadhimiya Stadium
- Chairman: ٍSaad Ebadi
- Manager: Ali Bahjat
- League: Iraqi Premier Division League
- 2025–26: Iraqi Premier Division League, 9th of 20
Home colours	Away colours

Al Kadhimiya is a sports club that is based in the Al Kadhimiya district in Iraq. Its football team currently plays in the Iraqi Premier Division League, the second tier of Iraqi football. Al-Kadhimiya participated in the Iraq Stars League on six previous occasions.

The club was founded in 1952.

== Managerial history ==
- (Iraq) Dhiyab Nehair
- (Iraq) Bahaa Kadhim
- (Iraq) Ali Bahjat

== Honours ==
- Iraqi First Division League
  - Runners-up: 2023–24
- Love and Peace Cup
  - Winners (1): 2013
