= Gharb Baghdad SC =

Iraqi football club

- Full name: Gharb Baghdad Sport Club
- Founded: 2019; 6 years ago
- Ground: Al-Salam Stadium
- Chairman: Faleh Al-Maameer
- Manager: Khaled Jamal
- League: Iraqi Third Division League
Home colours	Away colours

Gharb Baghdad Sport Club (Arabic: نادي غرب بغداد الرياضي), is an Iraqi football team based in Abu Ghraib District, Baghdad, that plays in the Iraqi Third Division League.

== Managerial history ==
- (Iraq) Tariq Taimah
- (Iraq) Khaled Jamal

== See also ==
- 2020–21 Iraq FA Cup
- 2021–22 Iraq FA Cup
