= Damuk SC =

Iraqi football club

- Full name: Damuk Sport Club
- Founded: 1990; 35 years ago
- Ground: Damuk Stadium
- Chairman: Dhurgham Taleb
- Manager: Hasanain Mussa
- League: Iraqi Third Division League
Home colours	Away colours

Damuk Sport Club (Arabic: نادي داموك الرياضي), is an Iraqi football team based in Wasit, that plays in Iraqi Third Division League.

== Managerial history ==
- (Iraq) Hasanain Mussa

== See also ==
- 2021–22 Iraqi Third Division League
