= Al-Shamiya SC =

Iraqi football club

- Full name: Al-Shamiya Football Club
- Founded: 1991; 35 years ago
- Ground: Mazin Hamoud Stadium
- Chairman: Kadhim Jallawi
- Manager: Rasim Jalil
- League: Iraqi Third Division League
Home colours	Away colours

Al-Shamiya Sport Club (Arabic: نادي الشامية الرياضي) is an Iraqi football team based in Al-Shamiya District, Al-Qādisiyyah, that plays in Iraqi Third Division League.

== Managerial history ==
- (Iraq) Hussein Mahdi
- (Iraq) Hafidh Kadhim
- (Iraq) Samah Hussein
- (Iraq) Rasim Jalil

== See also ==
- 2020–21 Iraq FA Cup
- 2021–22 Iraq FA Cup
