= Shahraban SC =

Iraqi football club

- Full name: Shahraban Sport Club
- Founded: 2003; 22 years ago
- Ground: Shahraban Stadium
- Chairman: Lateef Khalaf Al-Tamimi
- Manager: Mohammed Lateef
- League: Iraqi Third Division League
| Home colours | Away colours |

Shahraban Sport Club (Arabic: نادي شهربان الرياضي) is an Iraqi football team based in Al-Miqdadiya, Diyala, that plays in Iraqi Third Division League.

== Managerial history ==
- (Iraq) Mohammed Lateef

== See also ==
- 2015–16 Iraq FA Cup
- 2019–20 Iraq FA Cup
- 2020–21 Iraq FA Cup
- 2021–22 Iraq FA Cup
