= Baban SC =

Iraqi football club

- Full name: Baban Football Club
- Founded: 2019; 6 years ago
- Ground: Ashti Stadium
- Chairman: Bistun Qadir
- League: Iraqi Third Division League
Home colours	Away colours

Baban Sport Club (Arabic: نادي بابان الرياضي), is an Iraqi football team based in Sulaymaniyah, that plays in Iraqi Third Division League.

== History ==
Baban Club was founded in 2019 in Sulaymaniyah, and they currently have a team that plays in the Kurdistan Premier League as well, and they were a serious team ready to win the local title since their first participation in the local leagues.

== See also ==
- 2020–21 Iraq FA Cup
- 2021–22 Iraq FA Cup
