= Suq Al-Shuyukh SC =

Iraqi football club

Suq Al-Shuyukh FC
- Full name: Suq Al-Shuyukh Club
- Founded: 2004; 21 years ago
- Ground: Souk Al Shoyukh Stadium
- Capacity: 10,000
- Chairman: Hassan Salih Mahdi al-Araji
- Manager: Mohammed Kadhim
- League: Iraqi Third Division League
Home colours	Away colours

Suq Al-Shuyukh Club (Arabic: نادي سوق الشيوخ), is an Iraqi football team based in Suq al-Shuyukh, Dhi Qar, that plays in Iraqi Third Division League.

== Managerial history ==
- (Iraq) Bassim Obaid
- (Iraq) Hassan Al-Araji
- (Iraq) Moayad Tomeh
- (Iraq) Mohammed Kadhim

== See also ==
- 2019–20 Iraq FA Cup
- 2021–22 Iraq FA Cup
