= Al-Fosfat SC =

Iraqi football club

- Full name: Al-Fosfat Sport Club
- Founded: 1991; 35 years ago
- Ground: Al-Fosfat Stadium
- Manager: Waleed Motlag
- League: Iraqi Third Division League
Home colours	Away colours

Al-Fosfat Sport Club (Arabic: نادي الفوسفات الرياضي), is an Iraqi football team based in Al-Obaidi, Al-Anbar.

== Managerial history ==
- (Iraq) Omar Samir Al-Shammari
- (Iraq) Waleed Motlag

== See also ==
- 2001–02 Iraq FA Cup
- 2021–22 Iraq FA Cup
