= Sumer SC =

Iraqi football club

- Full name: Sumer Sport Club
- Founded: 2015; 10 years ago
- Ground: Sumer Stadium
- Chairman: Ahmed Waseel
- Manager: Ali Ubayyes
- League: Iraqi Third Division League
Home colours	Away colours

Sumer Sport Club (Arabic: نادي سومر الرياضي) is an Iraqi football team based in Al-Qādisiyyah.

== Stadium ==
In December 2018, Sumer Stadium was opened, and the opening witnessed a large crowd, and a match was held between Sumer and Al-Najma.

== Managerial history ==
- (Iraq) Ali Ubayyes

== See also ==
- 2021–22 Iraqi Third Division League
