= A'ali Al-Furat SC =

Iraqi football club

- Full name: A'ali Al-Furat Football Club
- Founded: 2019; 6 years ago
- Ground: A'ali Al-Furat Stadium
- Chairman: Ahmed Hameed Al-Abdali
- Manager: Saadi Awad
- League: Iraqi Third Division League
Home colours	Away colours

A'ali Al-Furat Sport Club (Arabic: نادي أعالي الفرات الرياضي), is an Iraqi football team based in Fallujah, Al-Anbar, that plays in Iraqi Third Division League.

== Managerial history ==
- (Iraq) Shehan Abed Shehan
- (Iraq) Saadi Awad

== See also ==
- 2020–21 Iraq FA Cup
- 2021–22 Iraq FA Cup
