= Al Shatrah Stadium =

Stadium in Iraq

- ملعب الشطرة
- Interactive map of Al Shatrah Stadium
- Full name: Al Shatrah Stadium
- Location: Dhi Qar, Iraq
- Coordinates: 31°24′56″N 46°10′30″E
- Owner: Ministry of Youth and Sports (Iraq)
- Capacity: 7,500
- Surface: Artificial turf
- Scoreboard: Yes
- Field size: 105 m × 68 m

Construction
- Opened: 3 January 2016

Tenants
- Shatra FC; Al-Nasiriya FC

Al Shatrah Stadium (Arabic: ملعب الشطرة) is a multi-purpose stadium in Dhi Qar, Iraq. It is currently used mostly for football matches and serves as the home stadium of Shatra FC and Al-Nasiriya FC. The stadium holds 7,500 people.

The stadium was inaugurated on 3 January 2016 with a ceremony consisting of sports activities and shows performed by local athletes from Al-Shatrah district.

== See also ==
- List of football stadiums in Iraq
