= Al-Dair SC =

Iraqi football club

- Full name: Al-Dair Sport Club
- Founded: 1994; 32 years ago
- Ground: Al-Dair Stadium
- Chairman: Saadi Abdul-Amir Shaddad
- Manager: Aqeel Muslim
- League: Iraqi Second Division League
- 2025–26: Iraqi Third Division League, 3rd (promoted)
| Home colours | Away colours |

Al-Dair Sport Club (Arabic: نادي الدير الرياضي) is an Iraqi football team based in Al-Dair District, Basra, that plays in Iraqi Second Division League.

== Managerial history ==
- (Iraq) Mohammed Al-Qaisi
- (Iraq) Bassim Karim
- (Iraq) Aqeel Muslim

== See also ==
- 2000–01 Iraqi Elite League
- 2021–22 Iraq FA Cup
