= Al-Mahawil SC =

Iraqi football club

- Full name: Al-Mahawil Sport Club
- Founded: 1991; 34 years ago
- Ground: Al-Mahawil Stadium
- Chairman: Mohammed Abdul-Khidhir
- Manager: Muhannad Raddam
- League: Iraqi Third Division League
Home colours	Away colours

Al-Mahawil Sport Club (Arabic: نادي المحاويل الرياضي), is an Iraqi football team based in Al-Mahawil, Babil, that plays in the Iraqi Third Division League.

== Managerial history ==
- (Iraq) Hassan Jawad
- (Iraq) Muhannad Raddam

== See also ==
- 2021–22 Iraq FA Cup
