= Mandali SC =

Iraqi football club

- Full name: Mandali Sport Club
- Founded: 2020; 5 years ago
- Ground: Mandali Stadium
- Chairman: Safaa Dawood Al-Mandalawi
- Manager: Adnan Ali Khamis
- League: Iraqi Third Division League
Home colours	Away colours

Mandali Sport Club (Arabic: نادي مندلي الرياضي), is an Iraqi football team based in Mandali, Diyala, that plays in Iraqi Third Division League.

== History ==
=== Re-establish ===
After it was canceled forty years ago, Mandali Sport club was re-established in November 2020 by the Ministry of Youth and Sports.

== Managerial history ==
- (Iraq) Adnan Ali Khamis

== See also ==
- 2021–22 Iraq FA Cup
