= Anah SC =

Iraqi football club

- Full name: Anah Sport Club
- Founded: 1991; 34 years ago
- Ground: Anah Stadium
- Chairman: Fares Ali Jawad
- Manager: Ayman Ahmed
- League: Iraqi Third Division League
| Home colours | Away colours |

Anah Sport Club (Arabic: نادي عانة الرياضي), is an Iraqi football team based in Anah, Al-Anbar, that plays in Iraqi Third Division League.

== Managerial history ==
- (Iraq) Salih Hussein
- (Iraq) Ayman Ahmed

== See also ==
- 2019–20 Iraq FA Cup
- 2020–21 Iraq FA Cup
- 2021–22 Iraq FA Cup
