= Ittihad Al-Hawija SC =

Iraqi football club

- Full name: Ittihad Al-Hawija Sport Club
- Founded: 2019; 6 years ago
- Ground: Al-Hawija Stadium
- Manager: Waad Al-Zubaidi
- League: Iraqi Third Division League
Home colours	Away colours

Ittihad Al-Hawija Sport Club (Arabic: نادي اتحاد الحويجة الرياضي), is an Iraqi football team based in Hawija District, Kirkuk, that plays in the Iraqi Third Division League.

== Managerial history ==
- (Iraq) Waad Al-Zubaidi

== See also ==
- 2020–21 Iraq FA Cup
- 2021–22 Iraq FA Cup
