= Al-Iraq SC =

Iraqi football club

- Full name: Al-Iraq Sport Club
- Founded: 2003; 22 years ago as Al-Taff
- Ground: Al-Iraq Stadium
- Chairman: Karim Abdul-Hussein
- Manager: Fadhel Abdul-Hussein
- League: Iraqi Third Division League
Home colours	Away colours

Al-Iraq Sport Club (Arabic: نادي العراق الرياضي), is an Iraqi football team based in Karbala, that plays in the Iraqi Third Division League.

== History ==
Al-Iraq SC was founded in 2003 in Karbala under the name Al-Taff SC until 2008, when the name of the club was changed to Al-Iraq SC.

== Managerial history ==
- (Iraq) Maitham Dael-Haq
- (Iraq) Fadhel Abdul-Hussein

== See also ==
- 2016–17 Iraq FA Cup
- 2021–22 Iraq FA Cup
