= Suq al-Shuyukh District =

Suq Al-Shuyukh District قضاء سوق الشيوخ
- District
- Location within Iraq
- Coordinates: 30°53′25″N 46°27′45″E
- Country: Iraq
- Governorate: Dhi Qar Governorate
- Time zone: UTC+3 (AST)

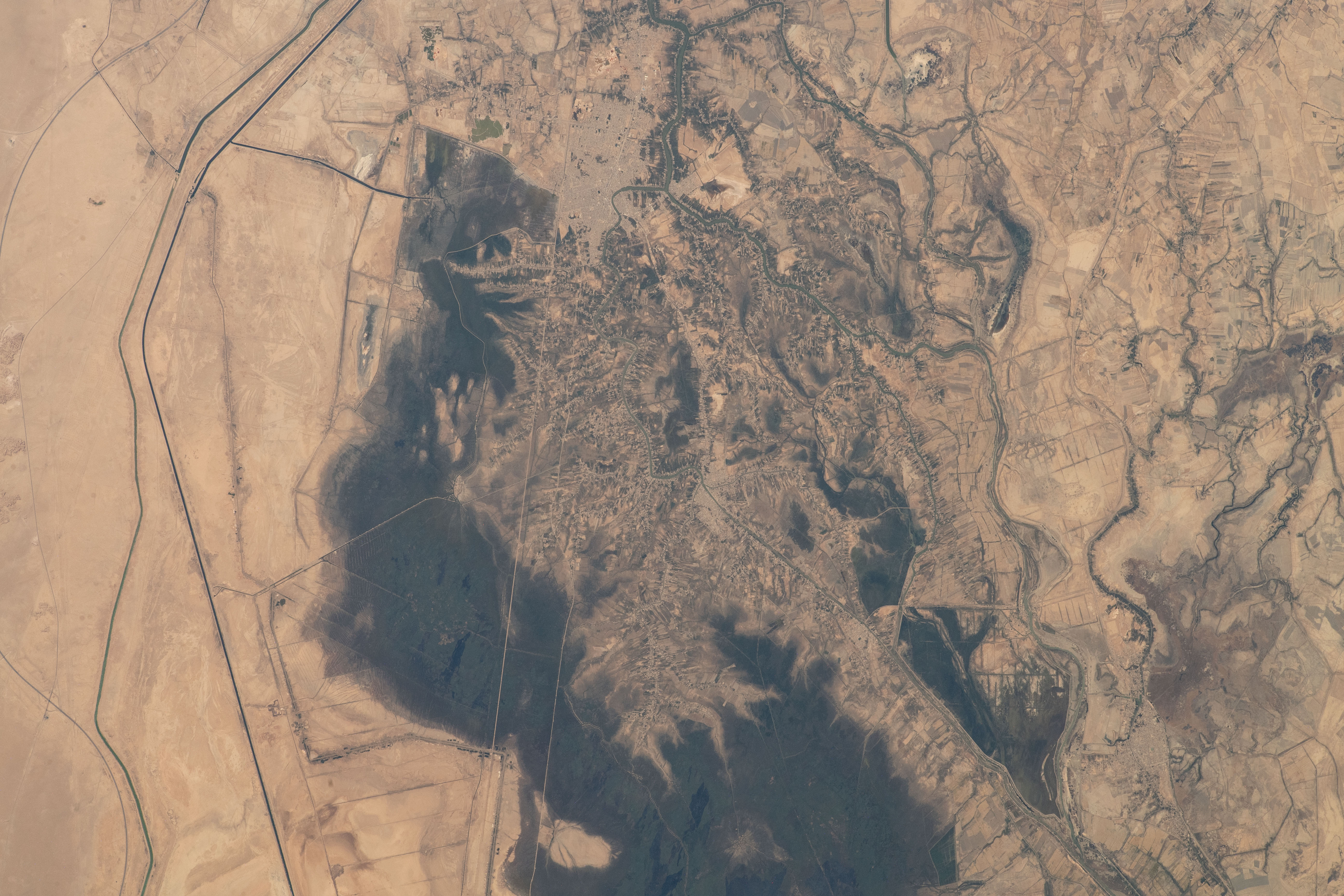
Satellite image of the town, with the Euphrates River, side canals, and wetland landscape also visible

Suq Al-Shuyukh District (Arabic: قضاء سوق الشيوخ, romanized: Sūq aš-Šuyūx; also called Suq al-Shoyokh District) is a district of the Dhi Qar Governorate, Iraq. Suq al-Shuyukh is a city surrounded by date palm orchards and located on the right bank of the Euphrates, at the western end of the Hawr al-Hammar lake and wetlands, about 40 km southeast of Nasiriya. Suq al-Shuyukh is a center of date and rice cultivation, which takes place in the areas to the north and west of the lake.

== History ==
Suq al-Shuyukh was founded in the early 18th century in Ottoman Iraq to serve as the suq (i.e. marketplace) of the Muntafiq tribal confederation. The leader of the entire Muntafiq confederation resided at Kut al-Shuyukh, four hours to the east. The name "Shuyukh" refers to the members of his clan.

Toward the end of the 18th century, Suq al-Shuyukh was "a small town with a mosque and surrounded by earthen walls". In the early 1800s, the town was described as "extremely dirty", and the Muntafiq's shaykh "disdained to live in the town". According to contemporary accounts, it was inhabited by 6,000 families and was a center for commercial exchange with Basra and even Bushir and Bombay.

During the 1800s, the town of Suq al-Shuyukh was separated into Muslim, Christian, Jewish, and Mandaean quarters, as reported during Julius Heinrich Petermann's 1854 visit to the town. The Mandaean quarter was known as Margab or Ṣubbūye and was located on the opposite bank of the Euphrates. Petermann's visit came shortly after a mass emigration of the town's Mandaean population around 1853. Before, there had been about 260 Mandaean families, many of them serving as silversmiths or boat-builders, but 200 of them had relocated to al-Amarah due to persecution by the Muntafiq. Petermann estimated the town's population to be 3,000. By this point, the shaykh owned a house in the town. During his visit, Petermann met with Shaykh Yahya Bihram, the high priest of the Mandaeans.

Around the end of the 19th century, V. Cuinet listed Suq al-Shuyukh's population at about 12,000. This included some 2,250 Sunnis, who had two mosques (jami's); 8,770 Shi'is, who had one "sanctuary" (masjid); 200 Jews; and 700 Mandaeans.

Under Ottoman rule, Suq al-Shuyukh was made the seat of a kaza in the sanjak of Muntafiq. It was later involved in the Iraqi revolt of 1920 as well as the 1935-1936 Iraqi Shia revolts.

== Notable people ==
Notable historical residents of Suq al-Shuyukh District include:

- Yahya Bihram, Mandaean priest

== Sports ==
Suq al-Shuyukh is home to the Suq Al-Shuyukh Stadium, and also the two football clubs Suq Al-Shuyukh FC and Al-Forat FC.
