= Tikrit SC =

Football club in Tikrit, Iraq

- Full name: Tikrit Sport Club
- Founded: 2019; 6 years ago
- Ground: Tikrit Stadium
- Capacity: 7,500
- Chairman: Anas Falah Al-Tikriti
- Manager: Saad Jabor Khalifa
- League: Iraqi Third Division League
Home colours	Away colours

Tikrit Sport Club (Arabic: نادي تكريت الرياضي), is an Iraqi football team based in Tikrit, Saladin.

== Managerial history ==
- (Iraq) Mohammed Saeed
- (Iraq) Arkan Ibrahim
- (Iraq) Dhiaa Khalil
- (Iraq) Saad Jabor Khalifa

== See also ==
- 2020–21 Iraq FA Cup
- 2021–22 Iraq FA Cup
