= Al-Maqal SC =

Iraqi football club

- Full name: Al-Maqal Sport Club
- Founded: 2019; 6 years ago
- Ground: Al-Maqal stadium
- Chairman: Faisal Al-Taher
- Manager: Aqeel Sainakh
- League: Iraqi Third Division League
Home colours	Away colours

Al-Maqal Sport Club (Arabic: نادي المعقل الرياضي), is an Iraqi football team based in Al-Maqal, Basra, that plays in Iraqi Third Division League.

== Managerial history ==
- (Iraq) Mohanad Al-Abadi
- (Iraq) Aqeel Sainakh

== See also ==
- 2019–20 Iraq FA Cup
- 2020–21 Iraq FA Cup
- 2021–22 Iraq FA Cup
