= Baladiyat Al-Mosul SC =

Iraqi football club

- Full name: Baladiyat Al-Mosul Sport Club
- Nicknames: Al-Hout Al-Azraq (Blue Whale)
- Founded: 2019; 7 years ago
- Ground: Baladiyat Al-Mosul Stadium
- Chairman: Abdul-Sattar Al-Habo
- Manager: Tariq Tuaima
- League: Iraqi First Division League
- 2025–26: Iraqi First Division League, 6th of 20
| Home colours | Away colours |

Baladiyat Al-Mosul Sport Club or Mosul Municipality Social & Sport Club (Arabic: نادي بلدية الموصل الرياضي والاجتماعي), is an Iraqi football team based in Mosul, Nineveh, that plays in Iraqi First Division League.

== Managerial history ==
- (Iraq) Salwan Mohammed
- (Iraq) Nashwan Ahmed Yassin
- (Iraq) Muwafaq Mahmoud
- (Iraq) Ziyad Mahmoud
- (Iraq) Tariq Tuaima

== See also ==
- 2020–21 Iraq FA Cup
- 2021–22 Iraq FA Cup
