= Al-Aziziyah Stadium =

Stadium in Iraq

- ملعب العزيزية
- Interactive map of Al-Aziziyah Stadium
- Full name: Al-Aziziyah Stadium
- Location: Wasit, Iraq
- Coordinates: 32°50′41.7″N 45°08′09.3″E
- Owner: Ministry of Youth and Sports (Iraq)
- Capacity: 5,000
- Surface: Artificial turf
- Scoreboard: Yes
- Field size: 105 m × 68 m

Construction
- Opened: 15 June 2019

Tenant
- Al-Aziziyah SC

Al-Aziziyah Stadium (Arabic: ملعب العزيزية) is a multi-use stadium in Wasit, Iraq. It is currently used mostly for football matches and serves as the home stadium of Al-Aziziyah SC. It also has facilities for athletics. The stadium holds 5,000 people.

The stadium was inaugurated on 15 June 2019 with a football game between former players from Wasit and former players of the Iraqi national team.

== See also ==
- List of football stadiums in Iraq
