= Al-Jamiea SC =

Iraqi football club

- Full name: Al-Jamiea Sport Club
- Founded: 2020; 6 years ago
- Ground: Al-Burj Stadium
- President: Younis Mahmoud
- Manager: Samer Saeed
- League: Iraqi Third Division League
Home colours	Away colours

Al-Jamiea Sport Club (Arabic: نادي الجامعة الرياضي), is an Iraqi football team based in Baghdad, that plays in the Iraqi Third Division League.

== Al-Talaba controversy ==
The club was founded by the former national team star Younis Mahmoud, and some fans of the Al-Talaba club considered that the establishment of the Al-Jamiea Club represents a coup against the Al-Talaba Club to dismantle it and rob its financial resources, because the two clubs belong to the same sponsor, the Ministry of Higher Education and Scientific Research, and because the name of the “Al-Jamiea” is the name of the team that Al-Talaba club was previously known by, but the Minister of Higher Education confirmed that there is no contemplation of dismantling the Al-Talaba club and the financial grant will be paid to it, and Younis Mahmoud stressed that the Al-Jamiea club relies on self-support.

== See also ==
- Al-Talaba SC
