= Al-Rutba SC =

Iraqi football club

- Full name: Al-Rutba Sport Club
- Founded: 1972; 54 years ago
- Ground: Al-Rutba Stadium
- Chairman: Omar Dawood
- Manager: Asaad Ibrahim
- League: Iraqi Third Division League
Home colours	Away colours

Al-Rutba Sport Club (Arabic: نادي الرطبة الرياضي), is an Iraqi football team based in Ar-Rutbah, Al-Anbar, that plays in Iraqi Third Division League.

== Managerial history ==
- (Iraq) Asaad Ibrahim

== See also ==
- 2021–22 Iraq FA Cup
