= Al-Sadeq SC =

Iraqi football club

- Full name: Al-Sadeq Sport Club
- Founded: 2004; 21 years ago
- Ground: Al-Sadeq Stadium
- Chairman: Hassan Jassim Al-Musawi
- Manager: Wissam Hamza
- League: Iraqi First Division League
Home colours	Away colours

Al-Sadeq Sport Club (Arabic: نادي الصادق الرياضي), is an Iraqi football team based in Al-Imam Al-Sadeq district, Basra, that plays in Iraqi First Division League.

== Managerial history ==
- (Iraq) Aqeel Al-Shaheen
- (Iraq) Wissam Hamza

== See also ==
- 2019–20 Iraq FA Cup
- 2021–22 Iraq FA Cup
