= Al-Furat SC =

Iraqi football club

Al-Furat Euphrates SC (English)
- Full name: Al-Furat Sports Club
- Founded: 1965; 61 years ago
- Ground: Souk Al Shoyukh Stadium
- Capacity: 10,000
- Chairman: Mohammed Hakal
- Manager: Abdul Yemma Warwar
- League: Iraqi First Division League
- 2025–26: Iraqi First Division League, 4th of 20
Home colours	Away colours

Al-Furat Sports Club (Euphrates SC, Arabic: نادي الفرات الرياضي) is an Iraqi football club based in Suq al-Shuyukh, Dhi Qar. They currently play in the Iraqi First Division League.
