= Medinat Al-Shuhadaa SC =

Iraqi football club

- Full name: Medinat Al-Shuhadaa Sport Club
- Founded: 2018; 7 years ago
- Chairman: Hameed Eqab
- Manager: Bashar Al-Lami
- League: Iraqi Third Division League
Home colours	Away colours

Medinat Al-Shuhadaa Sport Club (Arabic: نادي مدينة الشهداء الرياضي), is an Iraqi football team based in Al-Midaina District, Basra, that plays in Iraqi Third Division League.

== Managerial history ==
- (Iraq) Bashar Al-Lami

== See also ==
- 2019–20 Iraq FA Cup
- 2020–21 Iraq FA Cup
- 2021–22 Iraq FA Cup
