= Samer Saeed =

Iraqi footballer (born 1987)

Personal information
- Full name: Samer Saeed Mujbel
- Date of birth: 1 December 1987 (age 38)
- Place of birth: Al-Hilla, Iraq
- Height: 1.65 m (5 ft 5 in)
- Positions: Right winger; wide midfielder

Team information
- Current team: Al-Diwaniya (Manager)

Senior career*
Years	Team	Apps	(Gls)
2004–2006	Erbil		
2006–2007	Al-Quwa Al-Jawiya		
2007–2009	Al-Ahly Tripoli	26	(8)
2009–2010	Al-Shamal	10	(2)
2010	Al-Sailiya		
2010–2011	Al-Ahly Tripoli		
2011	Al-Zawraa		
2011–2012	Najaf		
2012–2013	Al-Naft		
2013–2014	Al-Zawraa		
2014–2015	Al-Quwa Al-Jawiya		
2015–2016	Al-Karkh		
2016–2017	Al-Talaba		

International career
2008–2011	Iraq	28	(0)

Managerial career
- 2020–2021: Al-Jamiea SC
- 2021–2022: Samarra FC
- 2022–: Al-Diwaniya
- * Club domestic league appearances and goals

Samer Saeed Mujbel Al Mamoori (Arabic: سامر سعيد مجبل; born 1 December 1987) is a former Iraqi midfielder.

He currently manages Al-Diwaniya in the Iraqi Premier League.

== Career ==
Saeed belongs among the generation of Iraqi players who emerged after 2003. As a teenager, he was recruited by Arbil FC, where he remained until 2006. After spending the next season with Baghdad-based Al-Quwa Al-Jawiya, he moved to Al-Ahly Tripoli in Libya in 2007. Saeed made a name for himself in his adopted country and was named Libya's ‘Best Foreign Player of the Year' in 2008.

== International career ==
In his international debut, a friendly with Jordan on 24 January 2008, Samer Saeed donned the number 8 jersey, a number Ahmad Abd Ali had seemingly made his own in Iraq's title-winning campaign at the 2007 AFC Asian Cup. The game ended 1-1, with Saeed playing impressively in his creative role. Prior to this senior bow, the diminutive midfielder had figured prominently with the Iraqi Olympic side that won silver at the 2006 Asian Games in Doha.

== Managerial statistics ==
As of 29 August 2022

Team	Nat	From	To	Record				
Team	Nat	From	To	G	W	D	L	Win %
Al-Jamiea SC	(Iraq)	29 October 2020	28 December 2021	19	13	3	3	68.42
Samarra SC	(Iraq)	31 December 2021	30 March 2022	9	1	3	5	11.11
Al-Diwaniya SC	(Iraq)	29 August 2022	""Present""	0	0	0	0	—
Total				28	14	6	8	50.00

== Honours ==
=== Country ===
- 2006 Asian Games Silver medallist.

=== Clubs ===
- Libyan League Best foreign Player 2008

== Personal ==
Samer is the twin brother of the Iraqi defender Samal Saeed and the older brother of Iraqi defender Sameh Saeed.
