= Al-Aziziya SC =

Iraqi football club

- Full name: Al-Aziziya Sport Club
- Founded: 1992; 34 years ago
- Ground: Al-Aziziyah Stadium
- Capacity: 5,000
- Manager: Hassan Arab
- League: Iraqi Third Division League
Home colours	Away colours

Al-Aziziya Sport Club (Arabic: نادي العزيزية الرياضي), is an Iraqi football team based in Al-Aziziya, Wasit, that plays in Iraqi Third Division League.

== Stadium ==
On June 15, 2019, the Ministry of Youth and Sports opened the Al-Aziziyah Stadium, with a capacity of 5,000 spectators, and the opening match was held between the former Iraq national football team stars and the former Wasit players team. Other sporting events were held, and performances were presented for the taekwondo team and athletics for men and women.

== Managerial history ==
- (Iraq) Karim Hachim
- (Iraq) Jassim Abdullah
- (Iraq) Hassan Arab

== See also ==
- 2000–01 Iraqi Elite League
- 2002–03 Iraq FA Cup
- 2021–22 Iraq FA Cup
