= Jadidat Al-Shatt SC =

Iraqi football club

- Full name: Jadidat Al-Shatt Sport Club
- Founded: 2007; 18 years ago
- Ground: Jadidat Al-Shatt Stadium
- Chairman: Abdul-Razzaq Mohsin
- Manager: Hassan Abdul-Hadi
- League: Iraqi Third Division League
Home colours	Away colours

Jadidat Al-Shatt Sport Club (Arabic: نادي جديدة الشط الرياضي), is an Iraqi football team based in Diyala, that plays in Iraqi Third Division League.

== Stadium ==
On March 2, 2022, the Ministry of Youth and Sports approved a project to rehabilitate the Jadidat Al-Shatt stadium, which will start working during the coming period.

== Managerial history ==
- (Iraq) Sarmad Rasheed
- (Iraq) Hassan Abdul-Hadi

== See also ==
- 2021–22 Iraq FA Cup
