= Sulaymaniyah Stadium =

Stadium in Iraq

Sulaymaniyah Stadium ملعب السليمانية ياریگای سلێمانی
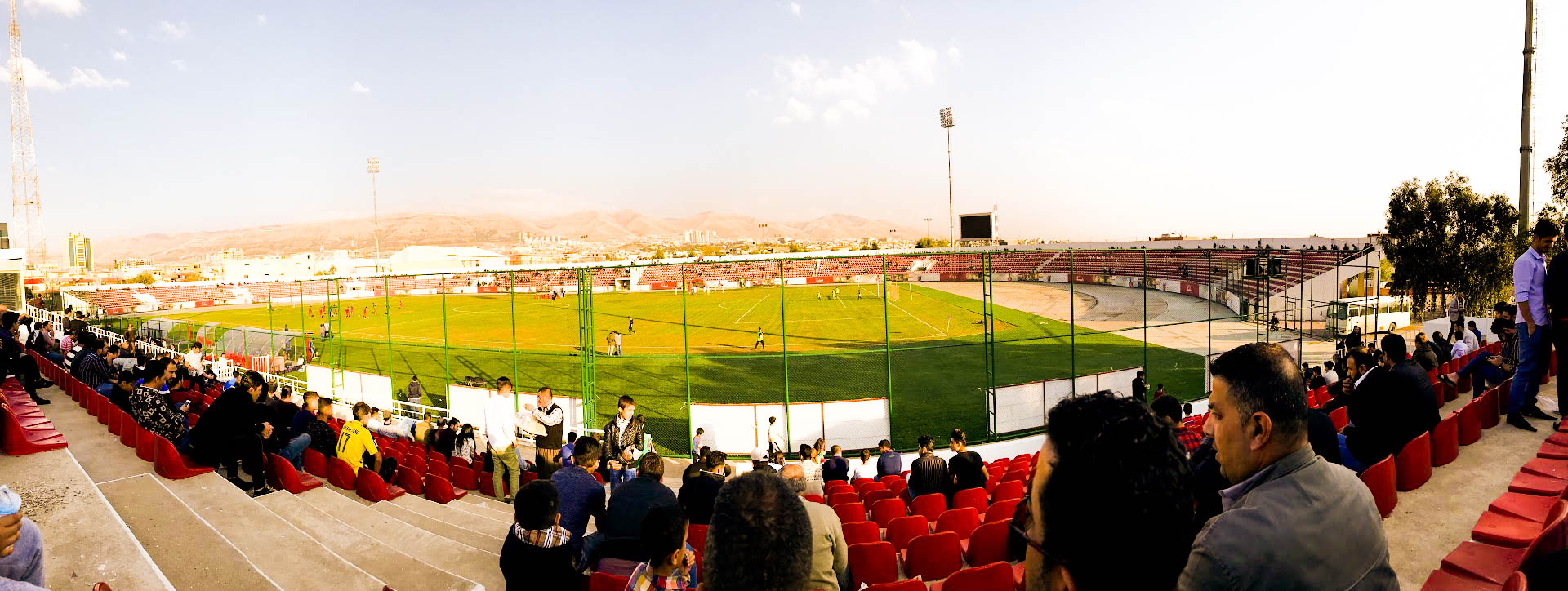
- Interactive map of Sulaymaniyah Stadium ملعب السليمانية ياریگای سلێمانی
- Full name: Sulaymaniyah Stadium
- Location: Sulaymaniyah, Kurdistan Region, Iraq
- Coordinates: 35°32′59″N 45°25′44″E
- Owner: Sulaymaniyah Governorate
- Capacity: 15,000
- Surface: Grass
- Scoreboard: Yes

Tenant
- Al-Sulaymaniyah FC

Sulaymaniyah Stadium, is a multi-use stadium in Sulaimaniyah, Kurdistan Region, Iraq. It is currently used mostly for football matches and serves as the home stadium of Sulaymaniyah FC. In 2017, Sulaymaniyah Stadium became the first stadium in the Kurdistan Region of Iraq to be internationally recognized by the Asian Football Confederation. One of the major stadiums in the Kurdistan Region, it has hosted a number of pro-independence rallies since 2017. It is also the temporary home of Newroz SC as of 2021 while the club's home stadium is under construction. The stadium holds 15,000 people.

== See also ==
- List of football stadiums in Iraq
