= Umm Al-Rabiain SC =

Iraqi football club

- Full name: Umm Al-Rabiain Sport Club
- Founded: 2017; 9 years ago as Al-Amwaj Al-Mosuli
- Ground: Al-Dawasa Stadium
- Chairman: Khaled Al-Obaidi
- Manager: Ridhwan Mohammed
- League: Iraqi Second Division League
- 2025–26: Iraqi First Division League, 18th of 20 (relegated)
Home colours	Away colours

Umm Al-Rabiain Sport Club (Arabic: نادي أم الربيعين الرياضي), is an Iraqi football team based in Mosul, that plays in Iraqi Second Division League.

== Managerial history ==
- (Iraq) Ali Hilal
- (Iraq) Ridhwan Mohammed

== See also ==
- 2020–21 Iraq FA Cup
