= Al-Hashd Al-Shaabi SC =

Iraqi football club

- Full name: Al-Hashd Al-Shaabi Sport Club
- Founded: 2020; 6 years ago
- Ground: Sharar Haidar Stadium (temporary use)
- League: Iraqi Premier Division League
- 2025–26: Iraqi Premier Division League, 18th of 20
Home colours	Away colours

Al-Hashd Al-Shaabi Sport Club (Arabic: نادي الحشد الشعبي الرياضي), is an Iraqi football team based in Baghdad, that plays in the Iraqi Premier Division League.

In the 2024–25 season, the team won the Iraqi First Division League title after defeating Al-Jaish on penalties in the final and was promoted to the Iraqi Premier Division League.

== Honours ==
- Iraqi First Division League (third tier)
  - Winners (1): 2024–25

== Managerial history ==
- (Iraq) Raad Kadhim
- (Iraq) Azhar Taher

== See also ==
- 2021–22 Iraq FA Cup
