= Al-Shatra SC =

Iraqi football club

Al-Shatra
- Full name: Al-Shatra Sports Club
- Founded: 1969; 57 years ago
- Ground: Al Shatrah Stadium
- Chairman: Jamil Aziz
- Manager: Tariq Tuaama
- League: Iraqi Premier Division League
- 2025–26: Iraqi First Division League, 2nd of 20 (promoted)
Home colours	Away colours

Al-Shatra Sports Club (Arabic: نادي الشطرة الرياضي) is an Iraqi football club, playing in the Iraqi Premier Division League. It is based in the town of Ash Shatra, just north of Nasiriyah in Dhi Qar Governorate.
