= Masafi Al-Shamal SC =

Iraqi football club

- Full name: Masafi Al-Shamal Sport Club
- Founded: 1992; 34 years ago
- Ground: Masafi Al-Shamal Stadium
- Chairman: Fawzi Younes
- Manager: Nasser Kamil
- League: Iraqi Premier Division League
- 2025–26: Iraqi First Division League, 1st of 20 (promoted)
Home colours	Away colours

Masafi Al-Shamal (Arabic: نادي مصافي الشمال), is an Iraqi football team based in Baiji, Saladin, that plays in Iraqi Premier Division League.

The team finished runners-up in the Iraqi Second Division League in the 2024–25 season after losing to Aliyat Al-Shorta in the final and was promoted to the Iraqi First Division League.

== Managerial history ==
- (Iraq) Thiab Radhi
- (Iraq) Nasser Kamil

== Honours ==
- Iraqi First Division League (third tier)
  - Winners: 2025–26

== See also ==
- 2013–14 Iraqi First Division League
- 2021–22 Iraq FA Cup
