= Al-Sufiya SC =

Iraqi football club

- Full name: Al-Sufiya Sport Club
- Founded: 2018; 8 years ago
- Ground: Al-Sufiya Stadium
- Chairman: Mohammed Awad Hussein
- Manager: Shaker Mohammed Sabbar
- League: Iraqi First Division League
- 2025–26: Iraqi First Division League, 3rd of 20
| Home colours | Away colours |

Al-Sufiya Sport Club (Arabic: نادي الصوفية الرياضي), is an Iraqi football team based in Al-Anbar, that plays in the Iraqi First Division League.

== Managerial history ==
- (Iraq) Ahmed Judea
- (Iraq) Shaker Mohammed Sabbar

== See also ==
- 2020–21 Iraq FA Cup
