= Suq Al-Shuyukh Stadium =

Stadium in Iraq

Suq Al-Shuyukh Stadium ملعب سوق الشيوخ
- Interactive map of Suq Al-Shuyukh Stadium ملعب سوق الشيوخ
- Location: Dhi Qar Governorate, Iraq
- Coordinates: 30°54′12″N 46°27′09″E
- Owner: Ministry of Youth and Sports (Iraq)
- Capacity: 5,000
- Surface: Artificial turf
- Field size: 105 m × 68 m

Construction
- Built: 2013-2015
- Opened: 1 March 2015
- Cost: $7.5 Million

Tenants
- Al-Forat FC; Suq Al-Shuyukh FC

Suq Al-Shuyukh Stadium (Arabic: ملعب سوق الشيوخ) is a multi-use stadium in Dhi Qar Governorate, Iraq. It is currently used mostly for football matches and serves as the home stadium of Al-Forat FC and Suq Al-Shuyukh FC. The stadium holds 5,000 people. Its construction cost approximately 7.5 million USD.

The stadium was inaugurated on 1 March 2015 by former Minister of Youth and Sports Abdul-Hussein Abtaan. The opening match was between Al-Forat FC and Al-Nasiriya FC who won 1–0.

== See also ==
- List of football stadiums in Iraq
