= Al-Shatrah =

Al-Shatrah الشطرة Shatrat al-Muntafiq, Shatreh
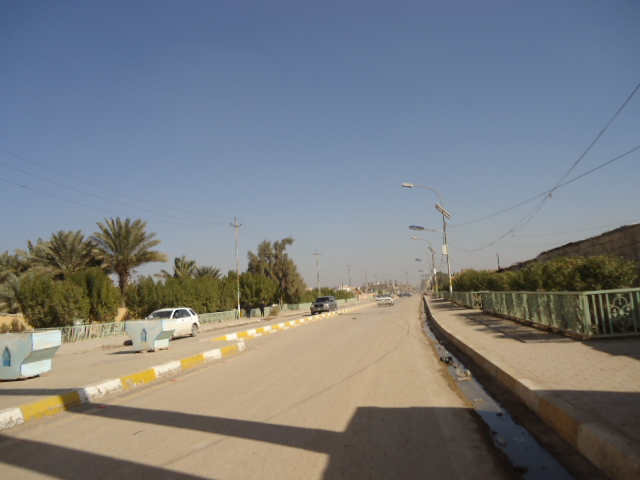

- Location in Iraq
- Coordinates: 31°24′35″N 46°10′18″E
- Country: Iraq
- Governorate: Dhi Qar Governorate
- Established: 1872
- Elevation: 13 ft (4 m)

Population (2014)
  - Total: 254,000 (estimated)

Al-Shatrah (also known as Shatrat al-Muntafiq) is a town in southern Iraq, located north of Nasiriyah. It is the administrative capital of the Al-Shatra District, a part of the Dhi Qar Governorate. Al-Shatrah is situated along the Gharraf Canal at the intersection with Highway 7. It lies 22.35 km (13.9 mi) west of the ancient city of Lagash. In 2009, it had a population estimated 254,000.

== History ==
Al-Shatrah was founded in 1872 in the late Ottoman Iraq period, and was part of the Basra Vilayet. Not long afterward, the town established a strong trading relationship with Baghdad and became a hub of the grain trade in southern Iraq. Shatrah became the most important town along the Gharraf Canal and gained the nickname "Little Baghdad". It served as the administrative center of a qadaa (subdistrict) of the same name, which was part of the Muntafiq Sanjak of the Basra Vilayet. The town's original official name was "Shatrat al-Muntafiq", but it was simplified by local residents to "al-Shatrah" to distinguish it from the nearby town of Qal'at Salih, which was officially known as "Shatrat al-Amarah" by the Ottoman authorities.

In June 1889, al-Shatrah experienced an outbreak of cholera, which caused the deaths of around 700 of its inhabitants, including the qaimaqam (lieutenant-governor) of the town. Prior to the outbreak, the population stood at around 5,000, but al-Shatrah was largely and temporarily deserted after the outbreak.

Al-Shatrah was a stronghold of the al-Muntafiq tribal confederation which dominated southern Iraq during the Ottoman era. In the early 20th century, it was regarded as the tribe's seat of power. It had a population of roughly 4,000, nearly all of whom were Shia Muslim Arabs with small Jewish and Mandean communities. Its market contained nearly 300 shops and was frequented by the Muntafiq tribesmen who predominated in the surrounding region. The Jewish community managed a primary school in the village.

=== Iraq War ===
During the 2003 U.S. invasion of Iraq, a body of a U.S. Marine was dragged through the streets of al-Shatrah and hanged in the town square.
