= Iraqi First Division League =

- Founded: 1974; 52 years ago
- Country: Iraq
- Number of clubs: 20
- Level on pyramid: 3
- Promotion to: Iraqi Premier Division League
- Relegation to: Iraqi Second Division League
- Current champions: Masafi Al-Shamal (2025–26)

The Iraqi First Division League is a football league that is the third tier of the Iraqi football league system, which was founded in 1974. The league consists of 20 teams split into two groups. The winners of each group are promoted to the Iraqi Premier Division League and advance to the final to compete for the league title. The runners-up of each group compete in a two-legged third place play-off, with the winners entering a promotion play-off with the 18th-placed team from the Premier Division League.

The two teams that finish bottom of their group are relegated to the Iraqi Second Division League. The ninth-placed teams of each group compete in a two-legged play-off, with the loser also being relegated to the Second Division League. The league is governed by the Iraq Football Association (IFA).

In the 2025–26 season, Masafi Al-Shamal won the championship title while Al-Shatra finished as runners-up.

== Competition name ==
Period	Name
1974–1995	National Clubs Third Division League
1995–1999	Second Division League
1999–2000	Third Division League
2000–2002	Second Division League
2002–2003	Third Division League
2003–2023	Second Division League
2023–present	First Division League

== Current clubs ==
=== 2025–26 season ===
Group 1	Group 2
Al-Sinaat Al-Kahrabaiya	Al-Sinaa
Masafi Al-Shamal	Al-Shatra
Samarra	Al-Furat
Al-Shirqat	Al-Qurna
Al-Sufiya	Al-Kufa
Al-Alam	Al-Samawa
Al-Falluja	Al-Taji
Al-Amwaj Al-Mosuli	Aliyat Al-Shorta
Al-Hawija	Al-Sulaikh
Baladiyat Al-Mosul	Al-Sadeq

== See also ==
- Iraq Stars League
- Iraq FA Cup
- Iraqi Super Cup
