= 2000–01 Iraqi Elite League =

Iraqi Elite League
- Season: 2000–01
- Champions: Al-Zawraa (10th title)
- Relegated: Al-Kut; Karbala
- 2002–03 AFC Champions League: Al-Zawraa
- Top goalscorer: Hussein Abdullah (21 goals)

The 2000–01 Iraqi Elite League was the 27th season of the competition since its foundation in 1974. The name of the league was changed from Iraqi First Division League to Iraqi Elite League. Instead of relegating teams from the 1999–2000 season and promoting teams from the lower division in order to decide which teams were playing in the competition, the Iraq Football Association decided that every eligible team in the country should play qualifying games in order to decide who participated.

The qualifying rounds saw a total of 135 teams being split into regional groups, all competing for the 16 places in the league. After all the qualifiers were over in December, the league competition itself was held with each team playing 30 matches. In the end, Al-Zawraa won their third league title in a row, finishing eight points clear at the top.

== Regional qualifiers ==
=== First round ===
In the first qualifying round, each province apart from Baghdad and Sulaymaniya had its own qualifying tournament with the winner advancing to the second qualifying round.

Province	Winner	Notes
Al-Anbar	Al-Ramadi	
Al-Qadisiya	Al-Diwaniya	Other competing teams included Al-Yaqdha, Afak, Al-Daghara, Al-Shamiya, Al-Rafidain and Ghammas
Babil	Al-Qasim	Al-Qasim played Babil in a play-off over two legs which ended 1–1 and 0–0; Al-Qasim qualified on away goals. Other competing teams included Al-Hilla
Basra	Al-Minaa	Al-Minaa played Al-Basra in a two-legged play-off; both legs ended in draws and Al-Minaa won 1–0 via a golden goal in extra-time. Other competing teams included Al-Bahri, Al-Ittihad, Al-Zubair, Kahrabaa Al-Hartha, Al-Junoob, Abi Al-Khaseeb, Al-Khor, Al-Qurna, Al-Dair, Umm Qasr, Al-Midaina and Al-Rumaila
Dhi Qar	Al-Nasiriya	
Diyala	Al-Khalis	Other competing teams included Diyala (who withdrew), Jalawla, Al-Miqdadiya, Khanaqin, Balad Ruz and Al-Shaheed Arkan
Duhok	Duhok	Other competing teams included Zakho and Pires
Erbil	Erbil	
Karbala	Karbala	Other competing teams included Al-Hindiya, Al-Jamahir and Al-Husseiniya
Kirkuk	Kirkuk	Other competing teams included Al-Thawra, Al-Hawija, Al-Dibis and Daquq
Maysan	Maysan	Other competing teams included Al-Amara
Muthanna	Al-Samawa	Other competing teams included Al-Khidhir, Al-Muthanna and Al-Rumaitha
Najaf	Al-Najaf	
Nineveh	Al-Mosul	Al-Mosul played Hikna in a two-legged play-off; both legs ended in draws (one of which was 3–3) and Al-Mosul qualified on away goals. Other competing teams included Al-Qayara, Al-Intisar, Zummar, Hamam Al-Alil, Tel Afar and Bashiqa
Salahaddin	Samarra	Other competing teams included Salahaddin, Al-Alam, Al-Dawr Al-Ahli, Al-Shirqat and Baiji
Wasit	Al-Kut	Other competing teams included Wasit, Al-Mutasim, Al-Hay, Al-Aziziya, Al-Numaniya and Al-Suwaira
Baghdad – All 35 teams admitted directly to second qualifying round
Sulaymaniya – Sulaymaniya admitted directly to second qualifying round

=== Second round ===
In the second qualifying round, which started in September and ended in December, the remaining teams were split into five regional groups. The two Baghdad groups were played in a single round-robin format (teams played each other once) while the other three groups were played in a double round-robin format (teams played each other twice).

==== North Group ====
Team	Result
Duhok	Qualified to Elite League
Samarra	Qualified to Elite League
Erbil	Qualified to Elite League
Kirkuk
Al-Mosul
Sulaymaniya

==== Central Group ====
Team	Result
Al-Najaf	Qualified to Elite League
Al-Ramadi	Qualified to Elite League
Karbala	Qualified to Elite League
Al-Khalis
Al-Qasim

==== South Group ====
Team	Result
Al-Kut	Qualified to Elite League
Al-Samawa	Qualified to Elite League
Al-Minaa	Qualified to Elite League
Maysan
Al-Nasiriya
Al-Diwaniya

==== Baghdad Group 1 ====
Pos	Team	Pld	W	D	L	GF	GA	GD	Pts	Qualification
1	Al-Shorta	17	16	1	0	82	8	+74	49	Qualified to Elite League
2	Al-Karkh	17	15	2	0	83	13	+70	47	Qualified to Elite League
3	Al-Zawraa	17	14	1	2	80	7	+73	43	Qualified to Elite League
4	Al-Jaish	17	12	2	3	42	16	+26	38	Qualified to Play-off round
5	Al-Sinaa	17	10	4	3	42	20	+22	34	
6	Al-Kadhimiya	17	9	5	3	40	14	+26	32	
7	Al-Nahdha	17	8	4	5	32	27	+5	28	
8	Al-Umal	17	7	5	5	38	29	+9	26	
9	Al-Siyaha	17	8	1	8	22	33	−11	25	
10	Al-Amana	17	6	6	5	39	32	+7	24	
11	Al-Shabab	17	6	4	7	17	20	−3	22	
12	Al-Bareed	17	5	3	9	23	47	−24	18	
13	Al-Khutoot	17	5	2	10	24	41	−17	17	
14	Al-Hudood	17	4	1	12	27	51	−24	13	
15	Al-Adhamiya	17	1	3	13	15	75	−60	6	
16	Tayaran Al-Jaish	17	1	2	14	10	55	−45	5	
17	Al-Shaheed Dulaf	17	1	1	15	13	72	−59	4	
18	Al-Madain	17	1	1	15	9	78	−69	4	

Source: Al-Shameri Archive

===== Results =====
Home \ Away	ADH	AMN	BRD	HUD	KDH	KKH	KHT	JSH	MDN	NDH	SHB	SHD	SHR	SIN	SIY	UML	ZWR	TYJ
Al-Adhamiya				3–9	0–4		0–2				0–3	2–2						1–1
Al-Amana	8–0		1–1	5–4			3–3		4–1		2–1	5–2			0–2	1–1	2–2	
Al-Bareed	2–1			4–2	1–1				1–0			2–0		1–3				
Al-Hudood					1–1					0–3	0–1				1–2			1–0
Al-Kadhimiya		1–1					3–1	0–3			1–0			0–0		1–0	0–2	
Al-Karkh	14–2	4–0	5–1	4–1	0–0		5–1		10–2	3–1	3–0	6–0			5–0	7–3	1–0	5–1
Al-Khutoot			5–0	1–2					1–0		0–0	2–0	1–7		0–1			3–0
Al-Jaish	5–1	2–1	6–3	3–1		0–5	4–2		5–0	0–0	1–0	6–0	0–1		5–0		0–2	1–0
Al-Madain	0–3			1–0	0–7					2–5	0–2		0–7		0–3			
Al-Nahdha	4–1	1–1	3–0		1–5		3–1							1–1				4–1
Al-Shabab			1–1							1–0					1–1			
Al-Shaheed Dulaf				1–2	0–5				4–2	0–2	1–3							
Al-Shorta	8–0	2–1	7–1	10–1	4–1	0–0				4–0	4–1	8–1				4–0		6–0
Al-Sinaa	4–0	3–1		2–1		1–6	4–0	0–0	7–0		1–0	6–0	0–5		2–0	0–0		7–0
Al-Siyaha	2–1		4–0		0–5					0–1		3–0	1–4			0–2		
Al-Umal	0–0		5–2	3–1			2–1	0–1	8–0	3–3	1–1	8–0						2–1
Al-Zawraa	7–0		3–0 (Note: The Al-Zawraa–Al-Bareed match originally ended 0–0 but was changed to a 3–0 win for Al-Zawraa due to Al-Bareed fielding an ineligible player.)	7–0			7–0		11–1	4–0	4–0	6–0	0–1	5–1	6–1	6–0		8–0
Tayaran Al-Jaish		2–3	0–3		0–5				0–0		0–2	4–2			0–2			

Source: Al-Shameri Archive
Legend: Blue = home team win; Yellow = draw; Red = away team win.

==== Baghdad Group 2 ====
Pos	Team	Pld	W	D	L	GF	GA	GD	Pts	Qualification
1	Al-Talaba	16	15	0	1	82	4	+78	45	Qualified to Elite League
2	Al-Naft	16	14	2	0	52	2	+50	44	Qualified to Elite League
3	Al-Quwa Al-Jawiya	16	14	1	1	65	7	+58	43	Qualified to Elite League
4	Al-Difaa Al-Jawi	16	12	2	2	60	13	+47	38	Qualified to Play-off round
5	Al-Shuala	16	9	1	6	28	18	+10	28	
6	Al-Majd	16	7	3	6	36	23	+13	24	
7	Haifa	16	7	3	6	21	24	−3	24	
8	Al-Sulaikh	16	7	1	8	34	28	+6	22	
9	Al-Mahmoudiya	16	6	4	6	13	25	−12	22	
10	Tamouz	16	5	4	7	19	29	−10	19	
11	Abu Ghraib	16	4	3	9	19	51	−32	15	
12	Al-Qaqaa	16	4	3	9	15	49	−34	15	
13	Al-Tijara	16	4	2	10	11	32	−21	14	
14	Al-Hurriya	16	3	3	10	19	42	−23	12	
15	Batal Al-Tahreer	16	3	1	12	15	52	−37	10	
16	Al-Salama	16	3	1	12	16	58	−42	10	
17	Al-Saqr Al-Arabi	16	1	2	13	13	61	−48	5	

Source: Al-Shameri Archive

===== Results =====
Home \ Away	ABU	DIF	HUR	MAH	MJD	NFT	QQA	QWJ	SLM	SQR	SHL	SLK	TLB	TJR	BTL	HFA	TMZ
Abu Ghraib		1–7			1–1		1–2		5–2	2–2	0–4			2–1	2–2		
Al-Difaa Al-Jawi					2–1	1–1			11–0			2–0	0–2		3–0		
Al-Hurriya	3–1	0–5					1–2	0–3	2–0			2–6			4–2		
Al-Mahmoudiya	1–0	3–3	1–0				0–0			1–0	0–3	1–1				0–0	2–1
Al-Majd			1–0	0–1			4–0		5–3	7–2				3–0		1–1	1–1
Al-Naft	7–0		7–0	4–0	2–0		4–0		4–0	7–0	1–0	3–1		2–0	2–0	2–0	5–0
Al-Qaqaa		0–5							2–1	3–2	0–2				1–2		
Al-Quwa Al-Jawiya	6–0	4–2		5–1	1–0	0–0	6–0		7–1	7–1	1–0	6–0	0–1	5–0		2–0	
Al-Salama				0–1						3–1			0–10	1–0			2–2
Al-Saqr Al-Arabi		0–8	2–2									1–4		2–1		0–1	
Al-Shuala		0–1	3–1		2–1				2–0	1–0		2–0		1–2	3–1		1–2
Al-Sulaikh	2–0				1–3		5–1		4–0					1–0	7–1		1–2
Al-Talaba	9–0		5–1	5–0	5–1	0–1	9–0			8–0	4–0	3–1		5–0	6–0	6–0	4–0
Al-Tijara		0–6	1–1	1–0			2–2								2–0		0–1
Batal Al-Tahreer				2–1	1–7			0–7	0–2	2–0						1–3	1–2
Haifa	1–2	1–2	3–2				3–0		2–1		4–4	1–0		0–1			1–0
Tamouz	1–2	0–2	0–0				2–2	1–5		4–0							

Source: Al-Shameri Archive
Legend: Blue = home team win; Yellow = draw; Red = away team win.

=== Play-off round ===
In the play-off round, the two fourth-placed teams from the Baghdad Groups faced off in a two-legged tie to determine the seventh qualifying team from Baghdad.

10 December 2000

Al-Difaa Al-Jawi	0–1	Al-Jaish

Al-Shorta Stadium, Baghdad
14 December 2000

Al-Jaish	1–2	Al-Difaa Al-Jawi

Al-Jaish Stadium, Baghdad

2–2 on aggregate. Al-Difaa Al-Jawi won on away goals and qualified for the Elite League.

== League table ==
Pos	Team	Pld	W	D	L	GF	GA	GD	Pts	Qualification or relegation
1	Al-Zawraa (C)	30	23	1	6	80	24	+56	70	2002–03 AFC Champions League preliminary round 3 (Note: Iraq were given two slots for the 2002–03 AFC Champions League, therefore 2000–01 league champions Al-Zawraa were admitted to the qualifying round and 2001–02 league champions Al-Talaba entered the group stage.)
2	Al-Quwa Al-Jawiya	30	18	8	4	53	24	+29	62	
3	Al-Shorta	30	19	3	8	60	26	+34	60	
4	Al-Talaba	30	17	9	4	43	22	+21	60	
5	Duhok	30	16	7	7	44	24	+20	55	
6	Al-Najaf	30	15	7	8	31	16	+15	52	
7	Al-Karkh	30	14	8	8	48	33	+15	50	
8	Al-Difaa Al-Jawi	30	13	9	8	33	29	+4	48	
9	Al-Minaa	30	10	10	10	24	26	−2	40	
10	Samarra	30	10	6	14	34	50	−16	36	
11	Al-Naft	30	8	10	12	31	40	−9	34	
12	Erbil	30	6	11	13	24	46	−22	29	
13	Al-Samawa	30	6	8	16	26	37	−11	26	
14	Al-Ramadi	30	6	4	20	31	67	−36	22	
15	Al-Kut (R)	30	3	3	24	18	56	−38	12	Relegation to the Iraqi First Division League
16	Karbala (R)	30	3	2	25	16	76	−60	11	Relegation to the Iraqi First Division League

Source: Ali Al-Sabti Archive
(C) Champions; (R) Relegated

== Results ==
Home \ Away	DIF	KKH	KUT	MIN	NFT	NJF	QWJ	RMA	SMA	SHR	TLB	ZWR	DHK	ERB	KRB	SMR
Al-Difaa Al-Jawi		3–1	1–0	0–0	1–0	1–0	0–2	3–0	1–0	1–3	1–1	2–1	2–1	2–0	3–0	1–0
Al-Karkh	2–2		1–0	2–1	1–0	1–2	2–1	3–2	0–0	1–2	0–0	1–0	1–3	2–0	7–0	5–1
Al-Kut	1–1	2–1		0–2	0–2	0–2	0–1	2–1	1–0	0–3	0–1	1–6	0–1	0–1	0–1	0–2
Al-Minaa	1–0	1–4	2–0		1–0	0–1	0–0	2–2	1–0	1–1	3–0	0–1	0–0	0–0	1–0	0–0
Al-Naft	1–1	1–1	2–1	3–0		2–1	0–1	4–2	0–0	0–3	1–2	2–4	2–1	1–1	0–0	1–1
Al-Najaf	1–0	4–0	1–0	2–0	0–0		0–0	4–1	2–0	0–2	0–0	1–0	0–0	1–0	1–0	1–0
Al-Quwa Al-Jawiya	1–1	1–1	3–0	0–0	2–0	2–1		4–3	4–0	1–0	2–0	2–2	4–0	0–0	2–0	5–1
Al-Ramadi	0–1	1–2	2–1	1–2	1–1	1–1	1–0		2–1	0–2	0–2	1–0	0–3	2–2	1–0	1–2
Al-Samawa	1–0	0–1	1–1	1–1	1–3	0–0	0–1	9–0		0–0	1–3	1–3	0–0	1–0	1–0	2–0
Al-Shorta	2–2	0–1	5–1	1–0	1–0	3–0	1–2	1–0	3–0		2–3	2–1	2–1	5–1	2–0	1–3
Al-Talaba	1–1	1–1	3–1	1–1	1–0	1–0	3–0	3–0	2–0	2–0		1–0	0–1	2–2	0–0	3–0
Al-Zawraa	5–0	3–2	2–1	3–0	5–0	1–0	4–2	2–1	2–0	2–0	3–0		4–0	5–2	8–0	6–2
Duhok	2–0	1–0	1–1	2–0	4–0	0–0	1–1	2–0	2–0	3–0	0–2	0–1		2–0	5–1	2–0
Erbil	1–1	0–0	2–1	0–2	1–1	0–2	0–1	2–1	3–2	0–3	1–1	0–4	1–1		2–0	0–0
Karbala	0–1	0–3	3–2	0–2	0–2	0–3	1–5	2–4	0–3	0–7	1–3	0–1	1–3	0–1		5–1
Samarra	1–0	1–1	2–1	1–0	2–2	1–0	2–3	4–0	1–1	0–3	0–1	0–1	1–2	3–1	2–1	

Source: Ali Al-Sabti Archive
Legend: Blue = home team win; Yellow = draw; Red = away team win.

== Season statistics ==
=== Top scorers ===
Pos	Scorer	Goals	Team
1	Hussein Abdullah	21	Duhok
2	Ahmed Khudhair	19	Al-Shorta
3	Ammar Ahmed	14	Al-Zawraa

=== Hat-tricks ===
Player	For	Against	Result	Date
(Iraq) Ammar Ahmed	Al-Zawraa	Karbala	8–0	4 January 2001
(Iraq) Hashim Ridha	Al-Shorta	Al-Najaf	3–0	9 January 2001
(Iraq) Ahmed Khalaf	Samarra	Al-Ramadi	4–0	9 January 2001
(Iraq) Ali Mansour^{4}	Al-Samawa	Al-Ramadi	9–0	16 February 2001
(Iraq) Mohammed Abdul-Nabi	Al-Samawa	Al-Ramadi	9–0	16 February 2001
(Iraq) Alaa Abdul-Sattar	Al-Zawraa	Al-Kut	6–1	23 April 2001
(Iraq) Hussein Abdullah	Duhok	Karbala	5–1	15 May 2001
(Iraq) Dhurgham Ali	Al-Quwa Al-Jawiya	Karbala	5–1	20 May 2001
(Iraq) Ahmed Khalaf^{4}	Al-Karkh	Karbala	7–0	28 May 2001
(Iraq) Ahmed Khudhair	Al-Shorta	Al-Difaa Al-Jawi	3–1	8 June 2001
(Iraq) Ahmed Khudhair^{5}	Al-Shorta	Al-Kut	5–1	14 June 2001
(Iraq) Amer Mushraf	Al-Shorta	Karbala	7–0	22 June 2001

Notes

^{4} Player scored 4 goals
^{5} Player scored 5 goals
