= 1999–2000 Iraq FA Cup =

Tournament details
- Country: Iraq

Final positions
- Champions: Al-Zawraa (14th title)
- Runners-up: Al-Quwa Al-Jawiya

Tournament statistics
- Top goal scorer(s): Husham Mohammed (7 goals)

The 1999–2000 Iraq FA Cup was the 23rd edition of the Iraq FA Cup as a club competition. The tournament was won by Al-Zawraa for the third time in a row and the 14th time in their history, beating Al-Quwa Al-Jawiya 4–3 on penalties in the final after a 0–0 draw. Al-Zawraa also won the League, the Umm al-Ma'arik Championship and the Perseverance Cup in the 1999–2000 season to become the second Iraqi side to win the domestic quadruple.

== Preliminary round ==
| Team 1 | Score | Team 2 |
|---|---|---|
| Zakho | 1–0 | Kara |
| Pires | 1–0 | Simele |
| Al-Nahdha | 3–2 | Al-Sinaa |
| Al-Shabab | 2–1 | Al-Bareed |
| Al-Mahmoudiya | 1–0 | Al-Amana |
| Babil | 3–2 | Al-Hilla |
| Al-Bahri | 4–0 | Al-Basra |
| Al-Shuala | 1–0 | Al-Sulaikh |
| Al-Salam | 2–1 | Al-Shatra |
| Balad | 3–1 | Al-Khutoot |

== Preliminary playoff round ==
| Team 1 | Score | Team 2 |
|---|---|---|
| Zakho | 5–3 | Pires |
| Al-Shabab | 2–1 | Al-Nahdha |

== Final phase ==
=== Bracket ===
Round of 32; First legs: 3 January 2000; Second legs: 17 January 2000
Al-Shorta | 1 | 0 | 1
Haifa (a) | 1 | 0 | 1
Al-Nasiriya | 0 | 0 | 0
Al-Minaa | 1 | 1 | 2
Erbil | 3 | 1 | 4
Al-Salam | 0 | 0 | 0
Al-Najaf | 0 | 2 | 2
Duhok | 1 | 0 | 1
Maysan | 2 | 0 | 2
Balad | 1 | 2 | 3
Al-Mosul | 2 | 1 | 3
Diyala | 4 | 3 | 7
Al-Ramadi (p) | 1 | 0 | 1 (4)
Al-Diwaniya | 0 | 1 | 1 (2)
Al-Zawraa | 3 | 1 | 4
Zakho | 0 | 0 | 0
Al-Talaba | 1 | 2 | 3
Al-Karkh | 2 | 2 | 4
Al-Kadhimiya | 0 | 2 | 2
Samarra | 1 | 2 | 3
Al-Samawa | 1 | 0 | 1
Salahaddin | 6 | 3 | 9
Al-Difaa Al-Jawi | 2 | 3 | 5
Al-Naft | 1 | 2 | 3
Al-Mahmoudiya | 0 | 0 | 0
Al-Shabab | 0 | 1 | 1
Al-Kut | 3 | 0 | 3
Al-Jaish (a) | 1 | 2 | 3
Babil | 2 | 0 | 2
Al-Bahri (w/o) | 3 | 3 | 6
Al-Shuala | 0 | 1 | 1
Al-Quwa Al-Jawiya | 2 | 5 | 7

Round of 16; First legs: 28 February 2000; Second legs: 6 March 2000
Haifa | 1 | 0 | 1
Al-Minaa | 1 | 1 | 2
Erbil | 2 | 0 | 2
Al-Najaf | 0 | 1 | 1
Balad | 0 | 0 | 0
Diyala (w/o) | 2 | 3 | 5
Al-Ramadi | 0 | 0 | 0
Al-Zawraa | 2 | 10 | 12
Al-Karkh | 6 | 0 | 6
Samarra | 0 | 1 | 1
Salahaddin | 1 | 0 | 1
Al-Difaa Al-Jawi | 0 | 2 | 2
Al-Shabab | 0 | 1 | 1
Al-Jaish | 2 | 0 | 2
Al-Bahri | 0 | 1 | 1
Al-Quwa Al-Jawiya | 2 | 2 | 4

Quarter-finals; First legs: 13 March 2000; Second legs: 20 March 2000
Al-Minaa | 1 | 1 | 2
Erbil | 1 | 0 | 1
Diyala | 0 | 0 | 0
Al-Zawraa | 0 | 5 | 5
Al-Karkh | 0 | 4 | 4
Al-Difaa Al-Jawi | 0 | 0 | 0
Al-Jaish | 1 | 3 | 4
Al-Quwa Al-Jawiya | 2 | 3 | 5

Semi-finals; First legs: 28 March 2000; Second legs: 3 April 2000
Al-Minaa | 0 | 0 | 0
Al-Zawraa | 1 | 2 | 3
Al-Karkh | 0 | 0 | 0
Al-Quwa Al-Jawiya | 1 | 1 | 2

Final; 28 April 2000
Al-Zawraa (p) | 0 (4)
Al-Quwa Al-Jawiya | 0 (3)

== Round of 32 ==
3 January 2000

| Al-Talaba | 1–2 | Al-Karkh |
|---|---|---|
| Abdul-Masih | | Abbas Hassan; Hameed |

Al-Shaab Stadium, Baghdad
17 January 2000

| Al-Karkh | 2–2 | Al-Talaba |
|---|---|---|
| Jummah; Jabbar | | Wahaib (pen.) |

Al-Shaab Stadium, Baghdad

Al-Karkh won 4–3 on aggregate.

3 January 2000

| Al-Kadhimiya | 0–1 | Samarra |
|---|---|---|
| | | Aziz |

Al-Kashafa Stadium, Baghdad
17 January 2000

| Samarra | 2–2 | Al-Kadhimiya |
|---|---|---|
| Ali Hussein; Salih | | Jehad; M. Hadi |

Samarra Stadium, Samarra

Samarra won 3–2 on aggregate.

3 January 2000

| Al-Samawa | 1–6 | Salahaddin |
|---|---|---|
| Salman | | Abdul-Amir; Obeid; Akram |

Al-Samawa Stadium, Samawa
17 January 2000

| Salahaddin | 3–0 | Al-Samawa |
|---|---|---|
| Abdul-Ridha; Yaseen; Obeid |

Tikrit Stadium, Tikrit

Salahaddin won 9–1 on aggregate.

3 January 2000

| Al-Difaa Al-Jawi | 2–1 | Al-Naft |
|---|---|---|
| Rasheed; B. Mahmoud | | N. Ali |

Al-Karkh Stadium, Baghdad
17 January 2000

| Al-Naft | 2–3 | Al-Difaa Al-Jawi |
|---|---|---|
| M. Kadhim (pen.); Abdul-Khaliq | | Rasheed; Nafea |

Al-Naft Stadium, Baghdad

Al-Difaa Al-Jawi won 5–3 on aggregate.

3 January 2000

| Al-Mahmoudiya | 0–0 | Al-Shabab |

Hatteen Stadium, Babil
17 January 2000

| Al-Shabab | 1–0 | Al-Mahmoudiya |
|---|---|---|
| Karim |

Al-Kashafa Stadium, Baghdad

Al-Shabab won 1–0 on aggregate.

3 January 2000

| Al-Kut | 3–1 | Al-Jaish |
|---|---|---|
| Azat; Ghalib | | Abdul-Razzaq |

Al-Kut Stadium, Kut
17 January 2000

| Al-Jaish | 2–0 | Al-Kut |
|---|---|---|
| B. Abdul-Hussein (pen.) 90+2' |

Al-Jaish Stadium, Baghdad

3–3 on aggregate. Al-Jaish won on away goals.

3 January 2000

| Babil | 2–3 | Al-Bahri |
|---|---|---|
| A. Mohammed; Shafi | | A. Jassim (pen.); Aasi |

Babil Stadium, Babil
17 January 2000

| Al-Bahri | 3–0 (w/o) | Babil |

Al-Bahri Stadium, Basra

Al-Bahri won 6–2 on aggregate.

3 January 2000

| Al-Shuala | 0–2 | Al-Quwa Al-Jawiya |
|---|---|---|
| | | H. Ahmed; Swadi (pen.) |

Al-Sinaa Stadium, Baghdad
17 January 2000

| Al-Quwa Al-Jawiya | 5–1 | Al-Shuala |
|---|---|---|
| Jafar (penalty missed); Abbas; J. Khudhair; Abdul-Sattar; Mohsen; M. Mohammed | | Saad |

Al-Shorta Stadium, Baghdad

Al-Quwa Al-Jawiya won 7–1 on aggregate.

3 January 2000

| Al-Shorta | 1–1 | Haifa |
|---|---|---|
| Abdul-Abbas | | Manahi |

Al-Shaab Stadium, Baghdad
17 January 2000

| Haifa | 0–0 | Al-Shorta |

Al-Sinaa Stadium, Baghdad

1–1 on aggregate. Haifa won on away goals.

3 January 2000

| Al-Nasiriya | 0–1 | Al-Minaa |
|---|---|---|
| | | Salman |

Al-Nasiriya Stadium, Nasiriya
17 January 2000

| Al-Minaa | 1–0 | Al-Nasiriya |
|---|---|---|
| Nasser |

Al-Minaa Stadium, Basra

Al-Minaa won 2–0 on aggregate.

3 January 2000

| Erbil | 3–0 | Al-Salam |
|---|---|---|
| Omar; Siamand; Salah Al-Deen |

Erbil Stadium, Erbil
17 January 2000

| Al-Salam | 0–1 | Erbil |

Erbil Stadium, Erbil

Erbil won 4–0 on aggregate.

3 January 2000

| Al-Najaf | 0–1 | Duhok |
|---|---|---|
| | | Zaidan |

Al-Najaf Stadium, Najaf
17 January 2000

| Duhok | 0–2 | Al-Najaf |
|---|---|---|
| | | M. Ali; Yahya |

Duhok Stadium, Duhok

Al-Najaf won 2–1 on aggregate.

3 January 2000

| Maysan | 2–1 | Balad |
|---|---|---|
| I. Jassim; Ibrahim | | Goal |

Maysan Stadium, Maysan
17 January 2000

| Balad | 2–0 | Maysan |
|---|---|---|
| Abboud; Farhan | | Ali; Yahya |

Balad Stadium, Balad

Balad won 3–2 on aggregate.

3 January 2000

| Al-Mosul | 2–4 | Diyala |
|---|---|---|
| Marzouq; A. Khalaf | | Majeed; Hameed; Mohsen; Sabeeh |

University of Mosul Stadium, Mosul
17 January 2000

| Diyala | 3–1 | Al-Mosul |
|---|---|---|
| Nasser; H. Saddam | | A. Khalaf |

Baquba Stadium, Baquba

Diyala won 7–3 on aggregate.

3 January 2000

| Al-Ramadi | 1–0 | Al-Diwaniya |
|---|---|---|
| Arzeij |

Al-Ramadi Stadium, Ramadi
17 January 2000

| Al-Diwaniya | 1–0 (a.e.t.) | Al-Ramadi |
|---|---|---|
| A. Ali (pen.) |
Penalties
| | 2–4 |

Al-Diwaniya Stadium, Diwaniya

1–1 on aggregate. Al-Ramadi won 4–2 on penalties.

3 January 2000

| Al-Zawraa | 3–0 | Zakho |
|---|---|---|
| A. Ahmed; E. Mohammed; M. Jassim Mahdi |

Al-Zawraa Stadium, Baghdad
17 January 2000

| Zakho | 0–1 | Al-Zawraa |
|---|---|---|
| | | Rahim |

Zakho Stadium, Zakho

Al-Zawraa won 4–0 on aggregate.

== Round of 16 ==
28 February 2000

| Al-Karkh | 6–0 | Samarra |
|---|---|---|
| Chathir; Abbas Hassan; A. Abdul-Hussein; T. Abdul-Hussein |

Al-Karkh Stadium, Baghdad
6 March 2000

| Samarra | 1–0 | Al-Karkh |
|---|---|---|
| Abdul-Ridha |

Samarra Stadium, Samarra

Al-Karkh won 6–1 on aggregate.

28 February 2000

| Salahaddin | 1–0 | Al-Difaa Al-Jawi |
|---|---|---|
| Abdul-Amir |

Tikrit Stadium, Tikrit
6 March 2000

| Al-Difaa Al-Jawi | 2–0 | Salahaddin |
|---|---|---|
| Ali; Abid Ali |

Al-Shaab Stadium, Baghdad

Al-Difaa Al-Jawi won 2–1 on aggregate.

28 February 2000

| Al-Shabab | 0–2 | Al-Jaish |
|---|---|---|
| | | J. Mohammed; Shallal |

Al-Kashafa Stadium, Baghdad
6 March 2000

| Al-Jaish | 0–1 | Al-Shabab |

Al-Jaish Stadium, Baghdad

Al-Jaish won 2–1 on aggregate.

28 February 2000

| Al-Bahri | 0–2 | Al-Quwa Al-Jawiya |
|---|---|---|
| | | Omran |

Al-Basra Stadium, Basra
6 March 2000

| Al-Quwa Al-Jawiya | 2–1 | Al-Bahri |
|---|---|---|
| H. Kadhim; Dhahid | | Nizar (pen.) |

Al-Shaab Stadium, Baghdad

Al-Quwa Al-Jawiya won 4–1 on aggregate.

28 February 2000

| Haifa | 1–1 | Al-Minaa |
|---|---|---|
| Fadhil | | A. Hadi |

Al-Sinaa Stadium, Baghdad
6 March 2000

| Al-Minaa | 1–0 | Haifa |
|---|---|---|
| Ammar Hussein |

Al-Minaa Stadium, Basra

Al-Minaa won 2–1 on aggregate.

28 February 2000

| Erbil | 2–0 | Al-Najaf |
|---|---|---|
| M. Jassim; Z. Mahmoud |

Erbil Stadium, Erbil
6 March 2000

| Al-Najaf | 1–0 | Erbil |
|---|---|---|
| M. Ali |

Al-Najaf Stadium, Najaf

Erbil won 2–1 on aggregate.

28 February 2000

| Balad | 0–2 | Diyala |
|---|---|---|
| | | Thani; Ahmed Hassan |

Samarra Stadium, Samarra
6 March 2000

| Diyala | 3–0 (w/o) | Balad |

Baquba Stadium, Baquba

Diyala won 5–0 on aggregate.

28 February 2000

| Al-Ramadi | 0–2 | Al-Zawraa |
|---|---|---|
| | | Salah; H. Mohammed |

Al-Ramadi Stadium, Ramadi
6 March 2000

| Al-Zawraa | 10–0 | Al-Ramadi |
|---|---|---|
| H. Mohammed; Karim; M. Jassim Mahdi; Hamad; A. Kadhim |

Al-Zawraa Stadium, Baghdad

Al-Zawraa won 12–0 on aggregate.

== Quarter-finals ==
13 March 2000

| Al-Karkh | 0–0 | Al-Difaa Al-Jawi |

Al-Karkh Stadium, Baghdad
20 March 2000

| Al-Difaa Al-Jawi | 0–4 | Al-Karkh |
|---|---|---|
| | | A. Abdul-Hussein; Zughair; Abbas Hassan |

Al-Kashafa Stadium, Baghdad

Al-Karkh won 4–0 on aggregate.

13 March 2000

| Al-Jaish | 1–2 | Al-Quwa Al-Jawiya |
|---|---|---|
| Abdul-Razzaq | | M. Khalaf; Hashim |

Al-Sinaa Stadium, Baghdad
20 March 2000

| Al-Quwa Al-Jawiya | 3–3 | Al-Jaish |
|---|---|---|
| A. Khudhair; Abdul-Sattar; Dhahid | | M. Jassim; Adnan (pen.) |

Al-Shaab Stadium, Baghdad

Al-Quwa Al-Jawiya won 5–4 on aggregate.

13 March 2000

| Al-Minaa | 1–1 | Erbil |
|---|---|---|
| Ammar Hussein | | Shubaib |

Al-Minaa Stadium, Basra
20 March 2000

| Erbil | 0–1 | Al-Minaa |
|---|---|---|
| | | Fahad |

Erbil Stadium, Erbil

Al-Minaa won 2–1 on aggregate.

13 March 2000

| Diyala | 0–0 | Al-Zawraa |

Baquba Stadium, Baquba
20 March 2000

| Al-Zawraa | 5–0 | Diyala |
|---|---|---|
| H. Mohammed (pen.); A. Ahmed; Abdul-Latif; Rahim |

Al-Shaab Stadium, Baghdad

Al-Zawraa won 5–0 on aggregate.

== Semi-finals ==
28 March 2000

| Al-Karkh | 0–1 | Al-Quwa Al-Jawiya |
|---|---|---|
| | | J. Khudhair 57' |

Al-Shaab Stadium, Baghdad
Referee: Mahmoud Nouraddin
3 April 2000

| Al-Quwa Al-Jawiya | 1–0 | Al-Karkh |
|---|---|---|
| Dhahid (pen.) |

Al-Shaab Stadium, Baghdad

Al-Quwa Al-Jawiya won 2–0 on aggregate.

28 March 2000

| Al-Minaa | 0–1 | Al-Zawraa |
|---|---|---|
| | | Abdul-Latif 7' |

Al-Minaa Stadium, Basra
Referee: Hazim Hussein
3 April 2000

| Al-Zawraa | 2–0 | Al-Minaa |
|---|---|---|
| E. Mohammed |

Al-Shaab Stadium, Baghdad

Al-Zawraa won 3–0 on aggregate.

== Final ==
28 April 2000

| Al-Zawraa | 0–0 (a.e.t.) | Al-Quwa Al-Jawiya |
Penalties
| E. Mohammed (penalty missed); Nassir (penalty missed); H. Mohammed (penalty missed); L. Hussein (penalty scored); Hamad (penalty scored); Qassim (penalty scored); A. Hussein Adan (penalty scored) | 4–3 | (penalty missed) H. Ahmed; (penalty missed) Abbas; (penalty scored) A. Khudhair; (penalty scored) Swadi; (penalty missed) H. Kadhim; (penalty scored) N. Saddam; (penalty missed) S. Kadhim |

Al-Shaab Stadium, Baghdad

Iraq FA Cup
1999–2000 winner
Al-Zawraa
14th title
