= 2001–02 Iraq FA Cup =

Tournament details
- Country: Iraq
- Teams: 100

Final positions
- Champions: Al-Talaba (1st title)
- Runners-up: Al-Shorta

The 2001–02 Iraq FA Cup was the 24th edition of the Iraq FA Cup as a club competition. The tournament was won by Al-Talaba for the first time in their history, after losing in the final six previous times. They beat Al-Shorta 1–0 in the final, preventing Al-Shorta from completing the cup double. Al-Talaba also won the 2001–02 Iraqi Elite League to complete their first ever double. The tournament consisted of 100 teams for the first time.

== Preliminary rounds ==
=== First preliminary round ===
Team 1	Score	Team 2
Al-Muthanna	1–0	Al-Furat
Sulaymaniya	2–1	Aso
Al-Shatra	1–0	Al-Kut
Karbala	?–? (5–4 p)	Al-Sadda
Al-Jaish	9–0	Al-Shabab
Al-Amana	?–? (5–3 p)	Al-Umal
Al-Shuala	4–1	Al-Siyaha
Pires	5–1	Ararat
Al-Hamza	?–? (6–5 p)	Al-Kufa
Al-Meshkhab	3–0	Al-Anbar
Al-Basra	4–1	Al-Hay
Salahaddin	4–1	Shabab Al-Dawr
Al-Rifai	6–0	Al-Muwafaqiya
Zakho	9–0	Hikna
Sinjar	3–0	Simele
Daquq	3–0	Al-Mosul
Bardarash	2–0	Al-Thawra
Haifa	3–2	Tamouz
Brusk	2–0	Diyala
Al-Khalis	3–0	Mateen
Al-Nasiriya	3–0	Al-Fajr
Al-Nahdha	3–1	Al-Khutoot
Al-Tijara	4–2	Al-Hurriya
Al-Hindiya	4–3	Al-Jamahir
Al-Shomali	2–1	Ghammas
Al-Diwaniya	4–3	Babil
Al-Ramadi	2–0	Al-Falluja
Al-Qasim	3–2	Al-Fosfat
Al-Mahmoudiya	2–1	Al-Qaqaa
Al-Khidhir	1–0	Al-Hadhr
Brayati	4–0	Al-Shaqlawa
Al-Shirqat	2–1	Balad
Al-Hudood	3–0	Khanaqin
Al-Numaniya	4–2	Al-Musayyib
Kahrabaa Al-Hartha	1–0	Al-Rumaitha
Kumait	5–0	Zummar
Al-Bahri	3–1	Maysan
Al-Amara	2–1	Al-Ittihad
Al-Hussein	7–0	Al-Madain
Afak	5–2	Al-Daghara
Al-Samawa	bye	
Al-Zubair	bye	
Kirkuk	bye	
Al-Dibis	bye	
Al-Kadhimiya	bye	
Al-Bareed	bye	
Al-Sinaa	bye	
Al-Hilla	bye	

=== Second preliminary round ===
Team 1	Score	Team 2
Al-Basra	1–0	Al-Khidhir
Salahaddin	3–1	Brayati
Al-Diwaniya	4–2	Al-Hindiya
Al-Ramadi	1–0	Karbala
Al-Nahdha	1–0	Haifa
Daquq	1–0	Al-Shirqat
Al-Amana	2–1	Al-Hudood
Al-Hussein	4–0	Al-Numaniya
Kahrabaa Al-Hartha	0–3	Al-Muthanna
Afak	2–1	Kumait
Al-Shatra	2–0	Al-Bahri
Al-Rifai	2–1	Al-Amara
Al-Shuala	4–2	Sulaymaniya
Pires	5–1	Al-Hamza
Al-Meshkhab	3–2	Sinjar
Zakho	6–0	Bardarash
Brusk	2–3	Al-Khalis
Al-Nasiriya	4–2	Al-Tijara
Al-Qasim	3–0	Al-Shomali
Al-Jaish	3–0 (w/o)	Al-Mahmoudiya
Al-Samawa	bye	
Al-Zubair	bye	
Kirkuk	bye	
Al-Dibis	bye	
Al-Kadhimiya	bye	
Al-Bareed	bye	
Al-Sinaa	bye	
Al-Hilla	bye	

=== Third preliminary round ===
Team 1	Score	Team 2
Al-Basra	6–1	Daquq
Salahaddin	7–0	Al-Muthanna
Al-Diwaniya	1–0	Al-Shuala
Al-Ramadi	2–1	Al-Khalis
Al-Samawa	?–? (5–4 p)	Al-Zubair
Kirkuk	6–0	Al-Dibis
Al-Kadhimiya	5–2	Al-Bareed
Al-Sinaa	3–0	Al-Hilla
Al-Nahdha	bye	
Al-Amana	bye	
Al-Hussein	bye	
Afak	bye	
Al-Shatra	bye	
Al-Rifai	bye	
Pires	bye	
Al-Meshkhab	bye	
Zakho	bye	
Al-Nasiriya	bye	
Al-Qasim	bye	
Al-Jaish	bye	

== Final phase ==
=== Bracket ===
Round of 32; First legs: 22 October 2001; Second legs: 5 November 2001
Al-Zawraa	3	2	5
Al-Amana	1	0	1
Al-Hussein	0	0	0
Al-Minaa	0	1	1
Al-Najaf	4	5	9
Al-Meshkhab	0	0	0
Al-Jaish	6	3	9
Al-Rifai	0	0	0
Al-Difaa Al-Jawi	5	1	6
Al-Diwaniya	0	1	1
Afak	1	0	1
Pires (a)	1	0	1
Salahaddin	2	1	3
Al-Qasim	1	0	1
Al-Basra	1	1	2
Al-Talaba	2	3	5
Al-Quwa Al-Jawiya	3	0	3
Duhok	1	1	2
Al-Shatra	0	0	0
Al-Karkh	0	4	4
Al-Kadhimiya	2	1	3
Kirkuk	0	2	2
Al-Naft	3	3	6
Al-Nahdha	0	0	0
Samarra	1	1	2
Al-Sinaa	0	1	1
Erbil	1	0	1
Al-Samawa	1	1	2
Al-Nasiriya	1	0	1
Zakho	1	1	2
Al-Ramadi	0	1	1
Al-Shorta	3	7	10

Round of 16; First legs: 19 November 2001; Second legs: 10 December 2001
Al-Zawraa	3	0	3
Al-Minaa	1	1	2
Al-Najaf	1	2	3
Al-Jaish	0	0	0
Al-Difaa Al-Jawi	1	3	4
Pires	0	1	1
Salahaddin	1	1	2
Al-Talaba	3	2	5
Al-Quwa Al-Jawiya	1	0	1
Al-Karkh (a)	1	0	1
Al-Kadhimiya	1	0	1
Al-Naft (a)	1	0	1
Samarra	4	3	7
Al-Samawa	0	0	0
Zakho	2	0	2
Al-Shorta	0	3	3

Quarter-finals; First legs: 21 January 2002; Second legs: 28 January 2002
Al-Zawraa	1	0	1
Al-Najaf	1	1	2
Al-Difaa Al-Jawi	0	0	0
Al-Talaba	0	1	1
Al-Karkh	0	0	0
Al-Naft	0	1	1
Samarra	0	1	1
Al-Shorta	3	1	4

Semi-finals; First legs: 7 April 2002; Second legs: 15 April 2002
Al-Najaf	1	0	1
Al-Talaba	1	2	3
Al-Naft	0	0	0
Al-Shorta	3	1	4

Final; 28 April 2002
Al-Talaba	1
Al-Shorta	0

== Matches ==
=== Quarter-finals ===
21 January 2002

Al-Zawraa	1–1	Al-Najaf
Abdul-Jabar 26'		Wahoudi 54'

Al-Shaab Stadium, Baghdad
28 January 2002

Al-Najaf	1–0	Al-Zawraa
Jawad 46'

Al-Najaf Stadium, Najaf

Al-Najaf won 2–1 on aggregate.

21 January 2002

Samarra	0–3	Al-Shorta
		Tariq 28'; Mushraf 65'; Ahmad 90+1'

Samarra Stadium, Samarra
28 January 2002

Al-Shorta	1–1	Samarra
Kadhim 47'		Aziz 61'

Al-Shorta Stadium, Baghdad

Al-Shorta won 4–1 on aggregate.

21 January 2002

Al-Karkh	0–0	Al-Naft

Al-Karkh Stadium, Baghdad
28 January 2002

Al-Naft	1–0	Al-Karkh
Mashal 75'

Al-Naft Stadium, Baghdad

Al-Naft won 1–0 on aggregate.

21 January 2002

Al-Difaa Al-Jawi	0–0	Al-Talaba

Al-Shorta Stadium, Baghdad
28 January 2002

Al-Talaba	1–0	Al-Difaa Al-Jawi
Mahmoud 72'

Al-Shaab Stadium, Baghdad

Al-Talaba won 1–0 on aggregate.

=== Semi-finals ===
7 April 2002

Al-Najaf	1–1	Al-Talaba
A. Hashim 43'		Q. Hashim 87'

Al-Najaf Stadium, Najaf
15 April 2002

Al-Talaba	2–0	Al-Najaf
Mahmoud 41'; Abbas 87'

Al-Shaab Stadium, Baghdad

Al-Talaba won 3–1 on aggregate.

7 April 2002

Al-Naft	0–3	Al-Shorta
		Hameed 9'; Mushraf 40'; Ogla 70'

Al-Sinaa Stadium, Baghdad
15 April 2002

Al-Shorta	1–0	Al-Naft
Ridha 70'

Al-Shorta Stadium, Baghdad

Al-Shorta won 4–0 on aggregate.

=== Final ===
28 April 2002

Al-Talaba	1–0	Al-Shorta
Hashim 85'

Al-Shaab Stadium, Baghdad
Referee: Alaa Abdul-Qadir

Al-Talaba	Al-Shorta

GK	21	(Iraq) Saad Nassir
CB	30	(Iraq) Hamza Hadi
CB	23	(Iraq) Ahmed Wali
CB	6	(Iraq) Bassim Abbas	Booked
RM	8	(Iraq) Habib Jafar (c)	Booked	Substituted off
CM	33	(Iraq) Walid Ahmad	Booked
CM	20	(Iraq) Bahaa Kadhim
CM	15	(Iraq) Hassan Turki
LM	29	(Iraq) Talib Abdul-Latif
CF	19	(Iraq) Sahib Abbas	Booked	Substituted off
CF	28	(Iraq) Younis Mahmoud	Booked	Substituted off
Substitutes:
DF	17	(Iraq) Arkan Najeeb		Substituted on
FW	7	(Iraq) Ahmed Salah		Substituted on
FW	25	(Iraq) Qusay Hashim		Substituted on
Manager:
(Iraq) Thair Ahmed

GK	1	(Iraq) Emad Hashim (c)
RB	3	(Iraq) Qais Issa	Booked
CB	4	(Iraq) Mahir Habib
CB	27	(Iraq) Khalid Mohammed Sabbar		Substituted off
LB	23	(Iraq) Mazin Abdul-Sattar	Booked	Substituted off
RM	13	(Iraq) Abbas Rahim	Booked
CM	25	(Iraq) Nashat Akram	Booked
CM	20	(Iraq) Faris Abdul-Sattar		Substituted off
LM	18	(Iraq) Ahmad Kadhim
CF	16	(Iraq) Ahmad Mnajed
CF	11	(Iraq) Amer Mushraf
Substitutes:
DF	29	(Iraq) Ziyad Tariq		Substituted on
MF	15	(Iraq) Ahmed Hussein Adan		Substituted on
FW	17	(Iraq) Hashim Ridha		Substituted on
Manager:
(Iraq) Ammo Baba

Assistant referees:
Abbas Abdul-Hussein
Arsalan Qadr
Mohammed Sahib

Match rules

- 90 minutes.
- 30 minutes of golden goal extra time if necessary.
- Penalty shoot-out if scores still level.
- Seven named substitutes, of which up to three may be used.

Iraq FA Cup
2001–02 winner
Al-Talaba
1st title
