= 2002–03 Iraq FA Cup =

Tournament details
- Country: Iraq
- Dates: 2 September 2002 – 23 August 2003
- Teams: 94

Final positions
- Champions: Al-Talaba (2nd title)
- Runners-up: Al-Shorta

The 2002–03 Iraq FA Cup was the 25th edition of the Iraq FA Cup as a club competition, the main domestic cup in Iraqi football. It kicked off on 2 September 2002, and the final was played on 23 August 2003 at the Franso Hariri Stadium in Erbil.

Al-Talaba were the defending champions of the cup having beaten Al-Shorta 1–0 in the 2002 final, and the same was repeated in 2003 as Al-Talaba beat Al-Shorta 1–0 again to earn their second title. The competition was halted for more than six months after the quarter-finals due to the American invasion of Iraq, but the Iraq Football Association decided to complete the tournament, reducing the semi-finals to a single leg and moving the remaining matches to the safer northern city of Erbil. The 2003 final was the last Iraq FA Cup final to be played until 2016.

== First round ==
2 September 2002	Brusk	3–1	Brayati	Erbil
	Bathar Akram 3' (pen.); Bashtwan Akram 45'; Abbas 68'		31' Jalal	Stadium: Franso Hariri Stadium

2 September 2002	Salahaddin	3–0	Akre	Tikrit
				Stadium: Tikrit Stadium

2 September 2002	Jalawla	0–1	Balad	Maqadiya
				Stadium: Maqadiya Stadium

2 September 2002	Tel Afar	3–1	Shabab Al-Dawr	Mosul
				Stadium: University of Mosul Stadium

2 September 2002	Khanaqin	1–0	Ararat	Khanaqin
				Attendance: Khanaqin Stadium

2 September 2002	Al-Khalis	0–1	Mateen	Al-Khalis
			15' Hassan	Stadium: Al-Khalis Stadium

2 September 2002	Al-Thawra	0–0 (a.e.t.) (W–L p)	Simele	Kirkuk
				Stadium: Al-Thawra Stadium

2 September 2002	Tamouz	0–0 (a.e.t.) (L–W p)	Al-Umal	Baghdad
				Stadium: Al-Kashafa Stadium

2 September 2002	Al-Tharthar	0–0 (a.e.t.) (W–L p)	Al-Hussein	Baghdad
				Stadium: Al-Tharthar Stadium

2 September 2002	Diyala	0–0 (a.e.t.) (W–L p)	Al-Amana	Diyala
				Stadium: Diyala Stadium

2 September 2002	Al-Suwaira	1–2	Al-Shuala	Baghdad
				Stadium: Al-Shuala Stadium

2 September 2002	Al-Anbar	2–1	Al-Tijara	Ramadi
				Stadium: Al-Ramadi Stadium

2 September 2002	Al-Sulaikh	3–1	Al-Shabab	Baghdad
				Stadium: Al-Amana Stadium

2 September 2002	Al-Kadhimiya	5–0	Al-Sumoud	Baghdad
				Stadium: Al-Kadhimiya Stadium

2 September 2002	Al-Hudood	0–3	Al-Ramadi	Baghdad
				Stadium: Al-Jaish Stadium

2 September 2002	Al-Hurriya	2–2 (a.e.t.) (4–2 p)	Haifa	Baghdad
				Stadium: Al-Hurriya Stadium

2 September 2002	Al-Hamza	0–1	Al-Mashroua	Al-Qadisiya
				Stadium: Al-Hamza Stadium

2 September 2002	Al-Aziziya	4–1	Al-Mahanawiya	Wasit
				Stadium: Al-Aziziya Stadium

2 September 2002	Al-Mahmoudiya	0–1	Al-Diwaniya	Mahmoudiya
				Stadium: Al-Mahmoudiyah Stadium

3 September 2002	Karbala	4–0	Al-Midhatiya	Karbala
				Stadium: Karbala Stadium

3 September 2002	Al-Sadda	0–0 (a.e.t.) (L–W p)	Al-Jamahir	Dhi Qar
				Stadium: Al-Sadda Stadium

3 September 2002	Al-Qasim	0–0 (a.e.t.) (W–L p)	Dijlah	Babil
				Stadium: Al-Qasim Stadium

3 September 2002	Hatteen	2–1	Al-Numaniya	Babil
				Stadium: Hatteen Stadium

3 September 2002	Al-Muwafaqiya	1–0	Al-Hindiya	Basra
				Stadium: Al-Muwafaqiya Stadium

3 September 2002	Afak	0–1	Al-Meshkhab	Afak
				Stadium: Afak Stadium

3 September 2002	Al-Bathaa	1–0	Al-Furat	Dhi Qar
				Stadium: Al-Bathaa Stadium

3 September 2002	Kahrabaa Al-Hartha	3–2	Wasit	Basra
				Stadium: Al-Basra Stadium

3 September 2002	Al-Rifai	1–1 (a.e.t.) (5–4 p)	Al-Muthanna	Dhi Qar
				Stadium: Al-Rifai Stadium

3 September 2002	Al-Khidhir	0–3	Al-Shatra	–
				Stadium: Al-Khudhair Stadium

3 September 2002	Al-Kut	1–0	Al-Bahri	Kut
				Stadium: Al-Kut Stadium

3 September 2002	Al-Nidaa	0–0 (a.e.t.) (5–4 p)	Al-Zubair	Basra
				Stadium: Al-Minaa Secondary Stadium

3 September 2002	Al-Majer	0–0 (a.e.t.) (W–L p)	Al-Hay	Maysan
				Stadium: Al-Majer Stadium

3 September 2002	Al-Gharraf	0–1	Ghaz Al-Junoob	Dhi Qar
				Stadium: Al-Gharraf Stadium

3 September 2002	Babil	1–0	Al-Musayyib	Babil
				Stadium: Babil Stadium

3 September 2002	Al-Alam	0–0 (a.e.t.) (W–L p)	Pires	Tikrit
				Stadium: Tikrit Stadium

3 September 2002	Hibhib	1–2 (a.e.t.)	Aso	Diyala
	Goal		Goal Golden goal	Stadium: Diyala Stadium

3 September 2002	Al-Nahdha	6–1	Al-Falluja	Baghdad
				Stadium: Al-Nahdha Stadium

== Second round ==
Al-Shuala were automatically placed into the round of 32.

9 September 2002	Brusk	3–1	Salahaddin	Erbil
				Stadium: Franso Hariri Stadium

9 September 2002	Balad	1–1 (a.e.t.) (4–2 p)	Tel Afar	Balad
	Talib		Mohammed	Stadium: Balad Stadium

9 September 2002	Mateen	3–0	Khanaqin	Duhok
	Hassan 7'; Ahmed 44'; Suliman 89'			Stadium: Duhok Stadium

9 September 2002	Al-Thawra	0–1	Al-Alam	Baghdad
				Stadium: Al-Thawra Stadium

9 September 2002	Aso	3–2	Al-Umal	Erbil
				Stadium: Brusk Stadium

9 September 2002	Diyala	2–3	Al-Tharthar	Diyala
	Bahjit 14', 73'		40', 63' Mutib; 90' Masoud	Stadium: Diyala Stadium

9 September 2002	Al-Anbar	0–0 (a.e.t.) (L–W p)	Al-Sulaikh	Ramadi
				Stadium: Al-Ramadi Stadium

9 September 2002	Al-Nahdha	3–0	Al-Kadhimiya	Baghdad
	Adnan; Hamza; Jabar			Stadium: Al-Jaish Stadium

9 September 2002	Al-Ramadi	1–0	Al-Hurriya	Ramadi
	Obaid 88' (pen.)			Stadium: Al-Ramadi Stadium

10 September 2002	Al-Diwaniya	4–0	Babil	Diwaniya
	Abdul-Wahid 3'; Burhan 28'; Hussein 43' (pen.); Khadim 90'			Stadium: Al-Diwaniya Stadium

10 September 2002	Hatteen	1–0	Al-Qasim	Babil
				Stadium: Hatteen Stadium

10 September 2002	Al-Meshkhab	4–0	Al-Muwafaqiya	Najaf
				Stadium: Al-Najaf Stadium

10 September 2002	Al-Shatra	0–0 (a.e.t.) (W–L p)	Al-Rifai	Al-Shatra
				Stadium: Al-Shatra Stadium

10 September 2002	Al-Nidaa	0–1	Al-Kut	Basra
			38' Habib	Stadium: Al-Minaa Secondary Stadium

10 September 2002	Al-Mashroua	3–1	Al-Aziziya	Basra
	Abdul-Hassan 44'; Hamid 63'; Hassan 70'		83' Ali	Stadium: Al-Mashroua Stadium

10 September 2002	Kahrabaa Al-Hartha	0–1	Al-Bathaa	Basra
				Stadium: Al-Bahri Stadium

10 September 2002	Ghaz Al-Junoob	2–1	Al-Majer	Basra
	Muhsin 26'; Muslim 85'		79' Talib	Stadium: Al-Basra Stadium

10 September 2002	Karbala	3–2	Al-Jamahir	Karbala
	Jaber; Malik		Sachit	Stadium: Karbala Stadium

== Playoff round ==
Al-Sulaikh, Hatteen, Al-Kut and Al-Mashroua were eliminated from the competition. Meanwhile, Al-Nahdha, who had qualified for the round of 32, withdrew and were replaced by Al-Ramadi. The following results are known from the playoff round:

Aso	0–2	Al-Tharthar	Erbil
			Stadium: Aso Stadium

Brusk	3–0 (w/o)	Al-Bathaa	Erbil
			Stadium: Brusk Stadium

== Final phase ==
=== Bracket ===
Round of 32; First legs: 30 September 2002; Second legs: 21 October 2002
Al-Alam	1	0	1
Al-Basra (w/o)	4	3	7
Duhok	1	1	2
Al-Talaba	0	3	3
Mateen	0	0	0
Karbala (w/o)	1	3	4
Al-Shuala (a)	0	1	1
Al-Karkh	0	1	1
Zakho	1	0	1
Al-Najaf	1	1	2
Samarra	2	1	3
Al-Sinaa (a)	2	1	3
Al-Minaa (a)	1	1	2
Al-Zawraa	0	2	2
Al-Jaish	2	0	2
Kirkuk	0	1	1
Erbil	2	0	2
Al-Difaa Al-Jawi	1	2	3
Al-Tharthar	3	2	5
Al-Shatra	0	2	2
Al-Diwaniya	2	0	2
Al-Meshkhab	0	0	0
Ghaz Al-Junoob	0	0	0
Al-Shorta	3	3	6
Al-Nasiriya	2	0	2
Al-Mosul	0	3	3
Brusk	3	0	3
Balad	0	0	0
Al-Quwa Al-Jawiya	1	2	3
Al-Ramadi	1	3	4
Al-Samawa	0	0	0
Al-Naft	1	2	3

Round of 16; First legs: 17 November 2003
Al-Basra	0	0	0
Al-Talaba	0	3	3
Karbala	3	2	5
Al-Shuala	2	1	3
Al-Najaf	3	3	6
Al-Sinaa	1	3	4
Al-Minaa	1	2	3
Al-Jaish	0	2	2
Al-Difaa Al-Jawi	5	2	7
Al-Tharthar	1	2	3
Al-Diwaniya	0	1	1
Al-Shorta	3	8	11
Al-Mosul	1	2	3
Brusk	0	2	2
Al-Ramadi	0	2	2
Al-Naft	0	3	3

Quarter-finals; First legs: 3 February 2003; Second legs: 17 February 2003
Al-Talaba	4	1	5
Karbala	1	0	1
Al-Najaf	1	0	1
Al-Minaa (a)	1	0	1
Al-Difaa Al-Jawi	0	2	2
Al-Shorta	2	1	3
Al-Mosul	1	1	2
Al-Naft (a)	2	0	2

Semi-finals; 20–21 August 2003
Al-Talaba	1
Al-Minaa	0
Al-Shorta	3
Al-Naft	2

Final; 23 August 2003
Al-Talaba	1
Al-Shorta	0

== Round of 32 ==
30 September 2002

Ghaz Al-Junoob	0–3	Al-Shorta
		Ogla; Hameed; Ahmed

Al-Basra Stadium, Basra
21 October 2002

Al-Shorta	3–0	Ghaz Al-Junoob
Ahmed 56', 89' (pen.); Hadi 61'

Al-Shorta Stadium, Baghdad

Al-Shorta won 6–0 on aggregate.

30 September 2002

Al-Nasiriya	2–0	Al-Mosul
Barak 40', 49'

Al-Nasiriya Stadium, Nasiriya
21 October 2002

Al-Mosul	3–0	Al-Nasiriya
Marzouq 42'; Rasheed 52'; Osama 73'

University of Mosul Stadium, Mosul

Al-Mosul won 3–2 on aggregate.

30 September 2002

Mateen	0–1	Karbala

Pires Stadium, Duhok
21 October 2002

Karbala	3–0 (w/o)	Mateen

Karbala Stadium, Karbala

Karbala won 4–0 on aggregate.

30 September 2002

Al-Jaish	2–0	Kirkuk

Al-Jaish Stadium, Baghdad
21 October 2002

Kirkuk	1–0	Al-Jaish
Ismail 29' (pen.)

Kirkuk Olympic Stadium, Kirkuk

Al-Jaish won 2–1 on aggregate.

30 September 2002

Duhok	1–0	Al-Talaba
Mushir 25'

Duhok Stadium, Duhok
21 October 2002

Al-Talaba	3–1	Duhok
Kadhim 2'; Karim 16', 25'		88' Khalef

Al-Talaba Stadium, Baghdad

Al-Talaba won 3–2 on aggregate.

30 September 2002

Samarra	2–2	Al-Sinaa
Shaalan 20', 73'		20' Abdul-Massih; 80' Hussein

Samarra Stadium, Samarra
21 October 2002

Al-Sinaa	1–1	Samarra
Munir 90'		38' Jassim

Al-Sinaa Stadium, Baghdad

3–3 on aggregate. Al-Sinaa won on away goals.

30 September 2002

Al-Quwa Al-Jawiya	1–1	Al-Ramadi
Abdul-Khaliq 25'		80' Hamed

Al-Shorta Stadium, Baghdad
21 October 2002

Al-Ramadi	3–2	Al-Quwa Al-Jawiya
Owad 13'; Hamed 14'; Mansi 70'		20' (pen.) Swadi; 88' Shaker

Al-Ramadi Stadium, Ramadi

Al-Ramadi won 4–3 on aggregate.

30 September 2002

Erbil	2–1	Al-Difaa Al-Jawi
Qasim 50'; Ahmed 60'		7' Suhail

Franso Hariri Stadium, Baghdad
21 October 2002

Al-Difaa Al-Jawi	2–0	Erbil
Karim 68'; Mansoor 78'

Al-Difaa Al-Jawi Stadium, Baghdad

Al-Difaa Al-Jawi won 3–2 on aggregate.

30 September 2002

Zakho	1–1	Al-Najaf

Zakho Stadium, Zakho
21 October 2002

Al-Najaf	1–0	Zakho
Hashim 1'

Al-Najaf Stadium, Najaf

Al-Najaf won 2–1 on aggregate.

30 September 2002

Al-Samawa	0–1	Al-Naft
		28' Abdul-Ridha

Al-Samawa Stadium, Samawa
21 October 2002

Al-Naft	2–0	Al-Samawa
Abdul-Ridha 77'; Khadim 88'

Al-Naft Stadium, Baghdad

Al-Naft won 3–0 on aggregate.

30 September 2002

Al-Shuala	0–0	Al-Karkh

Al-Zawraa Stadium, Baghdad
21 October 2002

Al-Karkh	1–1	Al-Shuala
Abdul-Jabar 59'		63' Mezher

Al-Karkh Stadium, Baghdad

1–1 on aggregate. Al-Shuala won on away goals.

30 September 2002

Al-Diwaniya	2–0	Al-Meshkhab
Salah 4'; Talal 80'

Al-Diwaniya Stadium, Al-Diwaniya
21 October 2002

Al-Meshkhab	0–0	Al-Diwaniya

Al-Meshkhab Stadium, Al-Meshkhab

Al-Diwaniya won 2–0 on aggregate.

30 September 2002

Al-Tharthar	3–0	Al-Shatra

Al-Tharthar Stadium, Baghdad
21 October 2002

Al-Shatra	2–2	Al-Tharthar

Al-Shatra Stadium, Al-Shatra

Al-Tharthar won 5–2 on aggregate.

30 September 2002

Al-Alam	1–4	Al-Basra

Tikrit Stadium, Tikrit
21 October 2002

Al-Basra	3–0 (w/o)	Al-Alam

Al-Basra Stadium, Basra

Al-Basra won 7–1 on aggregate.

30 September 2002

Brusk	3–0	Balad

Brusk Stadium, Erbil
21 October 2002

Balad	0–0	Brusk

Balad Stadium, Balad

Brusk won 3–0 on aggregate.

2002

Al-Minaa	1–0	Al Zawraa

Al-Minaa Stadium, Basra
11 November 2002

Al-Zawraa	2–1	Al-Minaa
Mohammed 55', 69'		90+2' Hadi

Al-Zawraa Stadium, Baghdad

2–2 on aggregate. Al-Minaa won on away goals.

== Round of 16 ==
17 November 2002

Al-Diwaniya	0–3	Al-Shorta
		Ali; Abdul-Latif; Abdul-Sattar

Al-Diwaniya Stadium, Al-Diwaniya
2002

Al-Shorta	8–1	Al-Diwaniya
Abbas 8'; Rahim 16', 21', 31', 85'; Ahmed 45', 83'; Abdul-Hussein 67'		20' Abdul-Wahid

Al-Shorta Stadium, Baghdad

Al-Shorta won 11–1 on aggregate.

17 November 2002

Al-Difaa Al-Jawi	5–1	Al-Tharthar
Mahmoud; Hussein; Karim; Mohammed		Mutaab

Al-Difaa Al-Jawi Stadium, Baghdad
2002

Al-Tharthar	2–2	Al-Difaa Al-Jawi
		1' Jassim; 46' Suhail

Al-Tharthar Stadium, Baghdad

Al-Difaa Al-Jawi won 7–3 on aggregate.

17 November 2002

Al-Najaf	3–1	Al-Sinaa
Hassan; Abbas; Jabbar		Munir

Al-Najaf Stadium, Najaf
2002

Al-Sinaa	3–3	Al-Najaf
Munir 10'; Abdul-Hassan 65'; Abid Zaid 87'		12' (pen.) Hashim; 45' Abbas; 90' Owaid

Al-Sinaa Stadium, Baghdad

Al-Najaf won 6–4 on aggregate.

17 November 2002

Al-Minaa	1–0	Al-Jaish
Abdul-Lateef

Al-Minaa Stadium, Basra
2002

Al-Jaish	2–2	Al-Minaa
Karim 42'; Sami 70'		46' Hadi; 66' Falah

Al-Jaish Stadium, Baghdad

Al-Minaa won 3–2 on aggregate.

17 November 2002

Al-Mosul	1–0	Brusk
Marzouq

University of Mosul Stadium, Mosul
2002

Brusk	2–2	Al-Mosul

Brusk Stadium, Erbil

Al-Mosul won 3–2 on aggregate.

17 November 2002

Karbala	3–2	Al-Shuala
Adheem; Hamza; Salih		Ahmed; Hameed

Karbala Stadium, Karbala
2002

Al-Shuala	1–2	Karbala

Al-Shuala Stadium, Baghdad

Karbala won 5–3 on aggregate.

17 November 2002

Al-Basra	0–0	Al-Talaba

Al-Basra Stadium, Basra
2002

Al-Talaba	3–0	Al-Basra
Abdul-Razzaq 45', 51'; Lewis 86'

Al-Talaba Stadium, Baghdad

Al-Talaba won 3–0 on aggregate.

17 November 2002

Al-Ramadi	0–0	Al-Naft

Al-Ramadi Stadium, Ramadi
2002

Al-Naft	3–2	Al-Ramadi
Hadi 32', 49', 81'		70' Ahmed; 85' Owad

Al-Naft Stadium, Baghdad

Al-Naft won 3–2 on aggregate.

== Quarter-finals ==
3 February 2003

Al-Najaf	1–1	Al-Minaa
Hashim 21' (pen.)		7' Falah

Al-Najaf Stadium, Najaf
17 February 2003

Al-Minaa	0–0	Al-Najaf

Al-Minaa Stadium, Basra

1–1 on aggregate. Al-Minaa won on away goals.

3 February 2003

Al-Mosul	1–2	Al-Naft
Mohammed 87'		14' Abdullah; 34' Salah

University of Mosul Stadium, Mosul
17 February 2003

Al-Naft	0–1	Al-Mosul
		30' Attiya

Al-Naft Stadium, Baghdad

2–2 on aggregate. Al-Naft won on away goals.

3 February 2003

Al-Talaba	4–1	Karbala
Jafar 16', 82'; Kadhim 49'; Abdul-Razzaq 74'		70' Farhud

Al-Shaab Stadium, Baghdad
17 February 2003

Karbala	0–1	Al-Talaba
		76' Kadhim

Al-Najaf Stadium, Najaf

Al-Talaba won 5–1 on aggregate.

3 February 2003

Al-Difaa Al-Jawi	0–2	Al-Shorta
		19', 30' Issa

Al-Karkh Stadium, Baghdad
17 February 2003

Al-Shorta	1–2	Al-Difaa Al-Jawi
Akram 30'		72' Mansoor; 76' Mahmoud

Al-Shorta Stadium, Baghdad

Al-Shorta won 3–2 on aggregate.

== Semi-finals ==
20 August 2003

Al-Talaba	1–0	Al-Minaa
Kadhim 90+2'

Franso Hariri Stadium, Erbil

21 August 2003

Al-Shorta	3–2	Al-Naft
Mnajed 24'; Kadhim 86'; Qasim 88'		48', 71' Talib

Franso Hariri Stadium, Erbil

== Final ==
23 August 2003

Al-Talaba	1–0	Al-Shorta
Salah 26'

Franso Hariri Stadium, Erbil
Attendance: 13,000

Al-Talaba	Al-Shorta

GK	(Iraq) Jamil Mahmoud (c)
DF	(Iraq) Aqeel Qasim
DF	(Iraq) Ahmed Wali
DF	(Iraq) Bassim Abbas
DF	(Iraq) Abbas Jafar
MF	(Iraq) Alaa Nayrouz
MF	(Iraq) Hassan Turki
MF	(Iraq) Bahaa Kadhim
MF	(Iraq) Mahdi Karim
FW	(Iraq) Ahmed Salah
FW	(Iraq) Younis Mahmoud
Manager:
(Iraq) Thair Ahmed

GK	(Iraq) Talib Hashim
DF	(Iraq) Mazin Abdul-Sattar
DF	(Iraq) Mahir Habib (c)
DF	(Iraq) Anmar Salam
DF	(Iraq) Ahmad Kadhim
MF	(Iraq) Mohanad Mohammed Ali
MF	(Iraq) Nashat Akram
MF	(Iraq) Abbas Rahim
MF	(Iraq) Taiseer Abdul-Hussein
FW	(Iraq) Hamid Qasim
FW	(Iraq) Ahmad Mnajed
Manager:
(Iraq) Basim Qasim

Match rules

- 90 minutes.
- 30 minutes of golden goal extra time if necessary.
- Penalty shoot-out if scores still level.
- Seven named substitutes, of which up to three may be used.

Iraq FA Cup
2002–03 winner
Al-Talaba
2nd title
