= 2004–05 Iraqi Premier League =

Iraqi Premier League
- Season: 2004–05
- Champions: Al-Quwa Al-Jawiya (5th title)
- Relegated: Balad; Pires; Al-Estiqlal; Al-Nasiriya; Al-Ramadi; Sulaymaniya; Al-Shuala; Al-Basra; Al-Mosul; Babil; Salahaddin; Al-Diwaniya
- AFC Champions League: Al-Quwa Al-Jawiya; Al-Minaa
- Arab Champions League: Al-Talaba; Al-Zawraa
- Top goalscorer: Mustafa Karim (16 goals)
- Biggest home win: Al-Zawraa 6–0 Al-Estiqlal (30 December 2004); Al-Kahrabaa 6–0 Salahaddin (18 January 2005); Al-Zawraa 6–0 Babil (28 February 2005)
- Biggest away win: Al-Shuala 0–7 Al-Zawraa (17 January 2005)
- Highest scoring: Salahaddin 2–7 Al-Kahrabaa (15 April 2005)

The 2004–05 Iraqi Premier League kicked off on October 20, 2004. The 36 teams were split into four groups. At the end of the group stage, the top three teams from each group (a total of 12 teams) advanced to the Elite Stage, while the bottom three in each group were demoted to the lower division.

In the Elite Stage, the 12 teams were split into four groups of three, with teams playing home and away against each team in their group respectively. The top team in each of the four groups moved on to the two-legged semi-finals which determined who played for the championship game; a single match held in Baghdad. Al-Quwa Al-Jawiya won their fifth Premier League title with a 2–0 victory over Al-Minaa.

== Group stage ==
=== North Group ===
Pos	Team	Pld	W	D	L	GF	GA	GD	Pts	Qualification or relegation
1	Al-Quwa Al-Jawiya	16	8	7	1	18	7	+11	31	Qualified to Elite Stage
2	Duhok	16	8	5	3	20	9	+11	29	Qualified to Elite Stage
3	Erbil	16	6	6	4	24	18	+6	24	Qualified to Elite Stage
4	Zakho	16	6	6	4	14	15	−1	24	
5	Kirkuk	16	5	5	6	19	19	0	20	
6	Sirwan	16	4	7	5	13	16	−3	19	
7	Pires	16	4	6	6	15	16	−1	18	Relegated to the Iraqi First Division League
8	Sulaymaniya	16	3	6	7	12	24	−12	15	Relegated to the Iraqi First Division League
9	Al-Mosul	16	2	4	10	13	24	−11	10	Relegated to the Iraqi First Division League

Source: Goalzz

==== Results ====
Home \ Away	PRS	MSL	QWJ	DUH	ERB	KIR	SRW	SUL	ZAK
Pires		3–0 (Note: The Pires–Al-Mosul match was awarded as a 3–0 win to Pires, as Al-Mosul did not turn up for the game.)	2–1	1–1	0–3	2–1	0–0	0–0	0–1
Al-Mosul	1–1		1–1	0–1	1–1	1–0	3–1	1–1	0–1
Al-Quwa Al-Jawiya	1–0	1–0		1–0	2–0	0–0	2–1	2–0	3–0
Duhok	3–1	2–1	0–1		3–0	1–0	1–1	1–0	0–0
Erbil	1–1	2–1	1–1	2–2		0–1	1–1	5–0	1–1
Kirkuk	1–0	2–1	2–2	0–3	1–2		0–0	5–2	3–1
Sirwan	2–1	1–0	0–0	1–0	1–4	1–1		0–0	3–0
Sulaymaniya	0–3	1–0	0–0	0–2	2–0	2–2	2–0		1–1
Zakho	0–0	5–2	0–0	0–0	0–1	1–0	1–0	2–1	

Source: Goalzz
Legend: Blue = home team win; Yellow = draw; Red = away team win.

=== Euphrates Group ===
Pos	Team	Pld	W	D	L	GF	GA	GD	Pts	Qualification or relegation
1	Al-Zawraa	16	12	4	0	46	9	+37	40	Qualified to Elite Stage
2	Al-Najaf	16	11	4	1	33	7	+26	37	Qualified to Elite Stage
3	Karbala	16	8	4	4	24	18	+6	28	Qualified to Elite Stage
4	Al-Sinaa	16	7	3	6	23	20	+3	24	
5	Al-Jaish	16	5	3	8	20	24	−4	18	
6	Al-Kadhimiya	16	3	7	6	15	24	−9	16	
7	Al-Estiqlal	16	4	4	8	13	25	−12	16	Relegated to the Iraqi First Division League
8	Al-Shuala	16	3	1	12	14	37	−23	10	Relegated to the Iraqi First Division League
9	Babil	16	2	4	10	13	37	−24	10	Relegated to the Iraqi First Division League

Source: Goalzz

==== Results ====
Home \ Away	EST	JSH	KDH	NJF	SHL	SIN	ZWR	BBL	KRB
Al-Estiqlal		1–2	1–0	1–4	1–0	2–0	0–0	2–2	0–0
Al-Jaish	0–3		1–1	2–1	5–2	0–0	1–2	4–1	0–2
Al-Kadhimiya	2–1	1–0		1–1	0–0	1–1	2–4	1–1	1–3
Al-Najaf	2–0	1–1	4–0		1–0	1–0	1–1	4–0	4–0
Al-Shuala	3–0 (Note: The Al-Shuala–Al-Estiqlal match was awarded as a 3–0 win to Al-Shuala due to Al-Estiqlal's players leaving the field on 83 minutes while losing 2–1.)	1–2	1–4	0–3		0–4	0–7	3–0	1–3
Al-Sinaa	1–0	3–1	1–1	0–1	3–0		0–2	2–1	1–4
Al-Zawraa	6–0	2–1	4–0	0–0	2–0	4–1		6–0	3–1
Babil	1–1	2–0	1–0	0–1	1–3	1–4	1–2		1–1
Karbala	2–0	1–0	0–0	1–4	1–0	1–2	1–1	3–0	

Source: Goalzz
Legend: Blue = home team win; Yellow = draw; Red = away team win.

=== Central Group ===
Pos	Team	Pld	W	D	L	GF	GA	GD	Pts	Qualification or relegation
1	Al-Talaba	16	8	4	4	26	13	+13	28	Qualified to Elite Stage
2	Al-Naft	16	7	6	3	23	14	+9	27	Qualified to Elite Stage
3	Al-Karkh	16	8	3	5	20	11	+9	27	Qualified to Elite Stage
4	Al-Kahrabaa	16	8	2	6	35	17	+18	26	
5	Diyala	16	6	7	3	18	16	+2	25	
6	Samarra	16	6	5	5	8	12	−4	23	
7	Balad	16	6	3	7	14	18	−4	21	Relegated to the Iraqi First Division League
8	Al-Ramadi	16	4	4	8	15	23	−8	16	Relegated to the Iraqi First Division League
9	Salahaddin	16	0	4	12	6	41	−35	4	Relegated to the Iraqi First Division League

Source: Goalzz

==== Results ====
Home \ Away	KAH	KKH	NFT	RAM	TLB	BLD	DIY	SAL	SMR
Al-Kahrabaa		2–3	0–1	4–0	1–0	1–0	3–3	6–0	4–0
Al-Karkh	1–2		1–1	1–0	1–0	1–0	1–2	3–0	3–0
Al-Naft	1–0	0–2		3–1	1–1	5–1	2–0	2–1	0–0
Al-Ramadi	2–1	1–1	0–2		1–0	1–0	2–3	5–2	0–1
Al-Talaba	2–0	1–0	3–3	2–0		4–2	2–2	4–0	1–1
Balad	0–3 (Note: The Balad–Al-Kahrabaa match was awarded as a 3–0 win to Al-Kahrabaa due to security guards calling off the match on 88 minutes while Al-Kahrabaa were winning 2–0.)	0–0	1–0	1–0	0–2		2–1	5–0	1–0
Diyala	1–1	1–0	2–2	0–0	1–0	0–0		1–0	0–1
Salahaddin	2–7	0–2	0–0	1–1	0–3	0–1	0–0		0–0
Samarra	1–0	1–0	1–0	1–1	0–1	0–0	0–1	1–0	

Source: Goalzz
Legend: Blue = home team win; Yellow = draw; Red = away team win.

=== South Group ===
Pos	Team	Pld	W	D	L	GF	GA	GD	Pts	Qualification or relegation
1	Al-Minaa	14	9	2	3	22	5	+17	29	Qualified to Elite Stage
2	Al-Kut	14	8	2	4	18	17	+1	26	Qualified to Elite Stage
3	Al-Shorta	14	7	3	4	25	11	+14	24	Qualified to Elite Stage
4	Al-Samawa	14	6	3	5	19	12	+7	21	
5	Maysan	14	4	8	2	14	12	+2	20	
6	Naft Al-Junoob	14	4	4	6	14	24	−10	16	
7	Al-Nasiriya	14	2	3	9	15	27	−12	9	Relegated to the Iraqi First Division League
8	Al-Basra	14	1	5	8	11	30	−19	8	Relegated to the Iraqi First Division League
9	Al-Diwaniya (Note: Al-Diwaniya withdrew from the league after eight matches, with their results being annulled.)	0	0	0	0	0	0	0	0	Relegated to the Iraqi First Division League

Source: Goalzz

==== Results ====
Home \ Away	BSR	DIW	KUT	MIN	NAS	SMA	SHR	MSN	NFJ
Al-Basra			1–3	1–2	2–4	1–1	0–0	1–1	1–1
Al-Diwaniya (Note: Al-Diwaniya withdrew from the league after eight matches, with their results being annulled.)	– (Note: Al-Diwaniya's results against Al-Minaa (2–0 loss), Maysan (1–0 loss), Al-Basra (0–0 draw), Al-Samawa (2–1 loss), Naft Al-Junoob (3–0 loss), Al-Kut (2–2 draw), Al-Shorta (2–1 loss) and Al-Nasiriya (3–2 loss) were annulled after their withdrawal from the league.)						–		–
Al-Kut	2–0	–		1–0	2–0	1–1	1–0	1–2	2–0
Al-Minaa	4–0	–	4–0		3–0	1–0	1–0	0–0	4–1
Al-Nasiriya	1–1	–	1–2	0–2		0–1	3–0 (Note: The Al-Nasiriya–Al-Shorta match was awarded as a 3–0 win to Al-Nasiriya, as Al-Shorta did not turn up for the game.)	1–1	2–3
Al-Samawa	5–0	–	3–1	0–1	2–2		3–0 (Note: The Al-Samawa–Al-Shorta match was awarded as a 3–0 win to Al-Samawa, as Al-Shorta did not turn up for the game.)	1–0	1–2
Al-Shorta	4–0		4–0	1–0	3–0 (Note: The Al-Shorta–Al-Nasiriya match was awarded as a 3–0 win to Al-Shorta, as Al-Nasiriya did not turn up for the game.)	2–0		5–1	1–1
Maysan	2–0	–	0–0	0–0	4–1	1–0	0–0		2–2
Naft Al-Junoob	0–3		1–2	1–0	1–0	0–1	1–5	0–0	

Source: Goalzz
Legend: Blue = home team win; Yellow = draw; Red = away team win.

== Elite stage ==
=== Group 1 ===
Pos	Team	Pld	W	D	L	GF	GA	GD	Pts	Qualification	MIN	KRB	DUH
1	Al-Minaa	4	3	0	1	8	4	+4	9	Qualified to Semi-finals		4–1	1–0
2	Karbala	4	1	1	2	6	8	−2	4		0–2		1–1
3	Duhok	4	1	1	2	5	7	−2	4		3–1	1–4	

Source: Goalzz

=== Group 2 ===
Pos	Team	Pld	W	D	L	GF	GA	GD	Pts	Qualification	TLB	NFT	KKH
1	Al-Talaba	4	2	2	0	3	0	+3	8	Qualified to Semi-finals		0–0	2–0
2	Al-Naft	4	2	1	1	4	3	+1	7		0–1		3–2
3	Al-Karkh	4	0	1	3	2	6	−4	1		0–0	0–1	

Source: Goalzz

=== Group 3 ===
Pos	Team	Pld	W	D	L	GF	GA	GD	Pts	Qualification	ZWR	NJF	SHR
1	Al-Zawraa	4	2	2	0	6	2	+4	8	Qualified to Semi-finals		1–1	2–0
2	Al-Najaf	4	2	2	0	4	1	+3	8		0–0		2–0
3	Al-Shorta	4	0	0	4	1	8	−7	0		1–3	0–1	

Source: Goalzz

=== Group 4 ===
Pos	Team	Pld	W	D	L	GF	GA	GD	Pts	Qualification	QWJ	ERB	KUT
1	Al-Quwa Al-Jawiya	4	3	0	1	8	2	+6	9	Qualified to Semi-finals		4–0	3–1
2	Erbil	4	3	0	1	8	5	+3	9		1–0		4–0
3	Al-Kut	4	0	0	4	2	11	−9	0		0–1	1–3	

Source: Goalzz

== Golden stage ==
Semi-finals
Al-Zawraa	0	0	0
Al-Minaa	1	0	1
Al-Quwa Al-Jawiya	1	2	3
Al-Talaba	0	2	2

Final
Al-Minaa	0
Al-Quwa Al-Jawiya	2
Third place match
Al-Zawraa	1 (1)
Al-Talaba (p)	1 (4)

=== Semi-finals ===
6 July 2005
14:00 GMT

Al-Zawraa	0–1	Al-Minaa
		Abdul-Kadhim 28' (pen.)

Al-Shaab Stadium, Baghdad
11 July 2005
13:05 GMT

Al-Minaa	0–0	Al-Zawraa

Al-Minaa Stadium, Basra

Al-Minaa won 1–0 on aggregate

7 July 2005
14:00 GMT

Al-Quwa Al-Jawiya	1–0	Al-Talaba
Saddam 24'

Al-Shaab Stadium, Baghdad
11 July 2005
14:00 GMT

Al-Talaba	2–2	Al-Quwa Al-Jawiya
Turki (red card) 46'; Nasser 67'; Abbas 69'		Mohammed 7'; Khudhair 63'

Al-Shaab Stadium, Baghdad

Al-Quwa Al-Jawiya won 3–2 on aggregate

=== Third place match ===
14 July 2005
14:00 GMT

Al-Zawraa	1–1	Al-Talaba
Abdul-Jabar 65'		Karim 57'
Penalties
Abdul-Jabar (penalty missed); Abdul-Sattar (penalty missed); Nassir (penalty scored)	1–4	(penalty scored) Abdul-Hassan; (penalty scored) Nasser; (penalty scored) Nayrouz; (penalty scored) Salah

Al-Shaab Stadium, Baghdad
Referee: Sabah Qasim

Al-Zawraa	Al-Talaba

GK	1	(Iraq) Ahmad Ali
DF	2	(Iraq) Haidar Mahmoud (c)
DF	5	(Iraq) Haidar Abdul-Qadir		(substituted off) 82'
DF	25	(Iraq) Hussein Abdul-Wahed
DF	4	(Iraq) Haidar Abdul-Amir
MF	23	(Iraq) Mohammed Ali
MF	9	(Iraq) Ahmad Abdul-Jabar	(yellow card) 25'
MF	24	(Iraq) Wissam Zaki		(substituted off) 90'
MF	16	(Iraq) Mohannad Nassir
FW	7	(Iraq) Muslim Mubarak
FW	19	(Iraq) Abbas Hassan		(substituted off) 73'
Substitutions:
FW	11	(Iraq) Alaa Abdul-Sattar		(substituted on) 73'
MF	18	(Iraq) Haitham Kadhim		(substituted on) 82'
MF	10	(Iraq) Haidar Sabah		(substituted on) 90'
Manager:
(Iraq) Mohammed Hussein Nasrallah

GK	20	(Iraq) Noor Sabri
DF	12	(Iraq) Haidar Abdul-Razzaq (c)
DF	24	(Iraq) Azhar Tahir
DF	17	(Iraq) Ali Noaman	(yellow card) 60'
MF	14	(Iraq) Alaa Nayrouz
MF	7	(Iraq) Ali Abbas
MF	29	(Iraq) Abbas Jafar		(substituted off) 72'
MF	18	(Iraq) Mahdi Karim		(substituted off) 74'
FW	11	(Iraq) Yassir Abdul-Razzaq
FW	9	(Iraq) Mohammed Nasser Shakroun
FW	32	(Iraq) Ahmed Salah
Substitutions:
MF	29	(Iraq) Bassim Abdul-Hassan		(substituted on) 72'
FW	18	(Iraq) Alaa Kadhim		(substituted on) 74'
Manager:
(Iraq) Thair Ahmed

Match officials

- Assistant referees:
  - Aziz Jassim
  - Amjad Shaker

Match rules

- 90 minutes.
- Penalty shootout if scores still level.

=== Final ===
15 July 2005
14:00 GMT

Al-Minaa	0–2	Al-Quwa Al-Jawiya
		Salah 58'; Essa 67' (o.g.)

Al-Shaab Stadium, Baghdad
Attendance: 15,000
Referee: Alaa Abdul-Qadir

Al-Minaa	Al-Quwa Al-Jawiya

GK	1	(Iraq) Saddam Salman
DF	4	(Iraq) Emad Aoda (c)
DF	15	(Iraq) Sattar Jabbar	(yellow card) 27'
DF	13	(Iraq) Alaa Abdul-Hussein	(yellow card) 74'
DF	21	(Iraq) Sajjad Abdul-Kadhim
MF	17	(Iraq) Qais Essa
MF	7	(Iraq) Ghazi Fahad	(yellow card) 37'	(substituted off) 73'
MF	14	(Iraq) Nawaf Salal
MF	25	(Iraq) Nawaf Falah		(substituted off) 77'
FW	30	(Iraq) Osama Shayyal		(substituted off) 70'
FW	9	(Iraq) Nasser Tallaa
Substitutions:
FW	8	(Iraq) Mukhlas Abdul-Sattar		(substituted on) 70'
MF	12	(Iraq) Ahmed Hassan		(substituted on) 73'
FW	10	(Iraq) Ammar Hussein	(yellow card) 82'	(substituted on) 77'
Manager:
(Iraq) Abdul-Karim Jassim

GK	1	(Iraq) Wissam Gassid
DF	3	(Iraq) Mukhlad Ali
DF	5	(Iraq) Ali Rehema
DF	6	(Iraq) Haidar Rahim
DF	4	(Iraq) Fareed Majeed	(yellow card) 17'
MF	11	(Iraq) Ali Khudhair
MF	8	(Iraq) Hussein Saddam		(substituted off) 88'
MF	20	(Iraq) Ghanim Khudhair		(substituted off) 60'
MF	10	(Iraq) Hawar Mulla Mohammed		(substituted off) 80'
FW	7	(Iraq) Luay Salah
FW	9	(Iraq) Waleed Dhahid (c)
Substitutions:
MF	17	(Iraq) Alaa Abdul-Wahid		(substituted on) 60'
MF	13	(Iraq) Humam Saleh		(substituted on) 80'
MF	34	(Iraq) Mohanad Mohammed Ali		(substituted on) 88'
Manager:
(Iraq) Sabah Abdul-Jalil

Match officials

- Assistant referees:
  - Mohammed Arab
  - Luay Subhi

Match rules

- 90 minutes.
- 30 minutes of extra-time if necessary.
- Penalty shootout if scores still level.

== Season statistics ==
=== Top four positions ===
Pos	Team	Pld	W	D	L	GF	GA	Qualification
1	Al-Quwa Al-Jawiya	23	13	8	2	31	11	2006 AFC Champions League
2	Al-Minaa	21	13	3	5	31	11	2006 AFC Champions League
3	Al-Talaba	23	10	8	5	32	17	2005–06 Arab Champions League
4	Al-Zawraa	23	14	8	1	53	13	2005–06 Arab Champions League

=== Top scorers ===
Pos	Scorer	Goals	Team
1	Mustafa Karim	16	Al-Kahrabaa
2	Ali Mohammed	12	Al-Najaf
3	Mohammed Kalaf	10	Al-Naft
3	Abbas Hassan	10	Al-Zawraa
5	Khalid Harbi	9	Al-Nasiriya

=== Hat-tricks ===
Player	For	Against	Result	Date
(Iraq) Sahib Abbas	Karbala	Al-Shuala	3–1	21 October 2004
(Iraq) Alaa Kadhim	Al-Talaba	Balad	4–2	29 October 2004
(Iraq) Samer Saeed	Erbil	Sulaymaniya	5–0	27 December 2004
(Iraq) Ayad Shaalan	Al-Sinaa	Al-Shuala	3–0	13 January 2005
(Iraq) Mustafa Karim^{4}	Al-Kahrabaa	Salahaddin	6–0	18 January 2005
(Iraq) Ali Mohammed	Al-Najaf	Babil	4–0	21 January 2005
(Iraq) Khalid Harbi	Al-Nasiriya	Al-Basra	4–2	17 February 2005
(Iraq) Mushtaq Kadhim	Al-Naft	Balad	5–1	18 February 2005
(Iraq) Mustafa Karim^{5}	Al-Kahrabaa	Salahaddin	7–2	15 April 2005
(Iraq) Ihssan Hadi	Duhok	Erbil	3–0	18 April 2005
(Iraq) Waleed Jawad	Balad	Salahaddin	5–0	1 May 2005
(Iraq) Hussein Ridha	Karbala	Duhok	4–1	2 July 2005

Notes

^{4} Player scored 4 goals
^{5} Player scored 5 goals
