= 1998–99 Iraq FA Cup =

Tournament details
- Country: Iraq

Final positions
- Champions: Al-Zawraa (13th title)
- Runners-up: Al-Talaba

Tournament statistics
- Top goal scorer(s): Hashim Ridha (14 goals)

The 1998–99 Iraq FA Cup was the 22nd edition of the Iraq FA Cup as a club competition. The tournament was won by Al-Zawraa for the second time in a row and for the 13th time in their history, beating Al-Talaba 1–0 after extra time in the final with a golden goal by Mohamed Jassim. Al-Zawraa also won the 1998–99 Iraqi Premier League to complete the double.

On 14 December 1998, Al-Shorta broke the record for the most goals scored in a single half of a match in Iraqi football, putting 10 goals past Al-Bahri in the first 45 minutes as the game ended 10–1. Hashim Ridha and Arkan Mahmoud both scored hat-tricks while Younis Abid Ali scored a brace and Abdul-Hussein Jawad and Qais Issa scored one each. Hashim Ridha's total of 14 goals in the competition is a record for the most goals scored by a player in an Iraq FA Cup tournament.

== Bracket ==
=== First preliminary round ===
| Team 1 | Score | Team 2 |
|---|---|---|
| Erbil | 13–0 | Makhmur |
| Babil | 2–1 | Al-Hindiya |
| Wasit | 2–3 | Al-Hudood |
| Al-Karat | 0–1 | Al-Khawarnaq |
| Simele | 0–1 | Al-Meshkhab |
| Al-Samawa | 1–0 | Al-Numaniya |
| Al-Wat | 2–3 | Al-Suwaira |
| Al-Shabab | 1–2 | Haifa |
| Al-Umal | 2–0 | Al-Shuala |
| Al-Difaa Al-Jawi | 3–0 | Al-Tijara |
| Al-Miqdadiya | 4–1 | Jalawla |
| Al-Musayyib | bye | |
| Kirkuk | bye | |
| Al-Khutoot | bye | |
| Al-Hilla | bye | |
| Al-Ramadi | bye | |
| Al-Qaqaa | bye | |
| Al-Diwaniya | bye | |
| Afak | bye | |
| Al-Bahri | bye | |
| Al-Hay | bye | |
| Al-Sufiya | bye | |
| Al-Mosul | bye | |
| Al-Amana | bye | |

=== Second preliminary round ===
| Team 1 | Score | Team 2 |
|---|---|---|
| Al-Musayyib | 0–3 | Al-Difaa Al-Jawi |
| Al-Suwaira | 6–0 | Al-Khawarnaq |
| Erbil | 4–1 | Kirkuk |
| Haifa | 3–0 | Al-Khutoot |
| Al-Hilla | 5–0 | Al-Meshkhab |
| Al-Ramadi | 1–0 | Al-Qaqaa |
| Al-Diwaniya | 5–1 | Afak |
| Al-Bahri | 3–1 | Al-Hay |
| Al-Hudood | 1–4 | Al-Sufiya |
| Al-Mosul | 3–0 | Al-Miqdadiya |
| Al-Amana | 2–1 | Al-Umal |
| Al-Samawa | 4–2 | Babil |

=== Final phase ===
Round of 32; First legs: 2 November 1998; Second legs: 16 November 1998
Al-Diwaniya | 0 | 1 | 1
Al-Kadhimiya | 1 | 1 | 2
Salahaddin | 0 | 0 | 0
Al-Minaa | 2 | 3 | 5
Al-Talaba | 3 | 0 | 3
Al-Difaa Al-Jawi | 0 | 1 | 1
Diyala | 4 | 0 | 4
Al-Zubair | 1 | 1 | 2
Al-Mosul | 6 | 4 | 10
Al-Hilla | 0 | 3 | 3
Erbil | 1 | 2 | 3
Al-Quwa Al-Jawiya | 1 | 5 | 6
Samarra | 0 | 0 | 0
Al-Naft | 1 | 2 | 3
Al-Ramadi | 2 | 2 | 4
Maysan | 0 | 1 | 1
Al-Amana | 2 | 1 | 3
Karbala | 2 | 0 | 2
Pires | 1 | 0 | 1
Duhok | 0 | 2 | 2
Al-Sufiya | 1 | 1 | 2
Al-Shatra | 1 | 2 | 3
Al-Najaf | 1 | 0 | 1
Al-Zawraa | 0 | 3 | 3
Al-Sulaikh (a) | 0 | 1 | 1
Al-Karkh | 0 | 1 | 1
Al-Suwaira | 0 | 0 | 0
Al-Jaish | 3 | 4 | 7
Al-Samawa | 1 | 0 | 1
Al-Shorta | 5 | 11 | 16
Al-Bahri | 4 | 1 | 5
Haifa | 1 | 2 | 3

Round of 16; First legs: 14 December 1998; Second legs: 28 December 1998
Al-Kadhimiya | 2 | 0 | 2
Al-Minaa | 2 | 1 | 3
Al-Talaba | 4 | 1 | 5
Diyala | 1 | 3 | 4
Al-Mosul | 0 | 0 | 0
Al-Quwa Al-Jawiya | 1 | 3 | 4
Al-Naft | 5 | 0 | 5
Al-Ramadi | 1 | 2 | 3
Al-Amana | 1 | 0 | 1
Duhok | 0 | 4 | 4
Al-Shatra | 0 | 1 | 1
Al-Zawraa | 3 | 3 | 6
Al-Sulaikh | 0 | 0 | 0
Al-Jaish | 2 | 4 | 6
Al-Shorta | 10 | 1 | 11
Al-Bahri | 1 | 0 | 1

Quarter-finals; First legs: 8 February 1999; Second legs: 1 March 1999
Al-Minaa | 1 | 0 | 1
Al-Talaba | 1 | 1 | 2
Al-Quwa Al-Jawiya | 3 | 2 | 5
Al-Naft | 1 | 0 | 1
Duhok | 2 | 2 | 4
Al-Zawraa | 4 | 3 | 7
Al-Jaish | 0 | 1 | 1
Al-Shorta | 1 | 2 | 3

Semi-finals; First legs: 15–16 March 1999; Second legs: 22–23 March 1999
Al-Talaba | 5 | 0 | 5
Al-Quwa Al-Jawiya | 0 | 0 | 0
Al-Zawraa | 2 | 4 | 6
Al-Shorta | 2 | 2 | 4

Final; 28 April 1999
Al-Zawraa (a.g.g.e.t.) | 1
Al-Talaba | 0

== Matches ==
=== Quarter-finals ===
8 February 1999

| Al-Quwa Al-Jawiya | 3–1 | Al-Naft |

Al-Shaab Stadium, Baghdad
1 March 1999

| Al-Naft | 0–2 | Al-Quwa Al-Jawiya |

Al-Sinaa Stadium, Baghdad

Al-Quwa Al-Jawiya won 5–1 on aggregate.

8 February 1999

| Duhok | 2–4 | Al-Zawraa |
|---|---|---|
| | | Mohammed; Abdul-Jabar; Abdul-Wahab |

Duhok Stadium, Duhok
1 March 1999

| Al-Zawraa | 3–2 | Duhok |
|---|---|---|
| Radhi; Abdul-Wahab |

Al-Shaab Stadium, Baghdad

Al-Zawraa won 7–4 on aggregate.

8 February 1999

| Al-Minaa | 1–1 | Al-Talaba |

Al-Minaa Stadium, Basra
1 March 1999

| Al-Talaba | 1–0 | Al-Minaa |

Al-Shaab Stadium, Baghdad

Al-Talaba won 2–1 on aggregate.

8 February 1999

| Al-Jaish | 0–1 | Al-Shorta |

Al-Shaab Stadium, Baghdad
1 March 1999

| Al-Shorta | 2–1 | Al-Jaish |

Al-Shorta Stadium, Baghdad

Al-Shorta won 3–1 on aggregate.

=== Semi-finals ===
15 March 1999

| Al-Talaba | 5–0 | Al-Quwa Al-Jawiya |
|---|---|---|
| Tariq 34'; Chathir 49'; Jafar 56'; Jeayer 75'; Jadieh 87' | | Dhahid (penalty missed); Ahmed (red card); Khalaf (red card) |

Al-Shaab Stadium, Baghdad
Referee: Mahmoud Nouraddin
23 March 1999

| Al-Quwa Al-Jawiya | 0–0 | Al-Talaba |

Al-Shaab Stadium, Baghdad

Al-Talaba won 5–0 on aggregate.

16 March 1999

| Al-Shorta | 2–2 | Al-Zawraa |
|---|---|---|
| Ridha; Abbas | | Radhi (pen.); Hamad |

Al-Shaab Stadium, Baghdad
22 March 1999

| Al-Zawraa | 4–2 | Al-Shorta |
|---|---|---|
| Hussein; Abdul-Jabar; Mohammed; Radhi (pen.) | | Ridha |

Al-Shaab Stadium, Baghdad

Al-Zawraa won 6–4 on aggregate.

=== Final ===
28 April 1999

| Al-Zawraa | 1–0 (a.e.t.) | Al-Talaba |
|---|---|---|
| Hussein (red card); Radhi (penalty missed); Mahdi | | Saadoun (red card) |

Al-Shaab Stadium, Baghdad

Iraq FA Cup
1998–99 winner
Al-Zawraa
13th title
