= 2002–03 Iraqi First Division League =

Iraqi First Division League
- Season: 2002–03
- Champions: N/A (season cancelled)
- 2003 Arab Unified Club Championship: Al-Shorta
- 2004 AFC Champions League: Al-Shorta; Al-Quwa Al-Jawiya
- 2003–04 Arab Champions League: Al-Zawraa; Al-Talaba

The 2002–03 Iraqi First Division League was the 29th season of the top-tier Iraqi national football league since its establishment in 1974. Organised by the Iraq Football Association (IFA), the league's name was changed to Iraqi First Division League, and it started on 6 September 2002.

27 rounds of the league were played before the 2003 invasion of Iraq began on 20 March 2003. Despite the outbreak of the Iraq War, matches continued with free entry for spectators, and games from rounds 28 and 29 were played in the midst of the conflict. The last matches were played on 28 March before the league stopped and Saddam Hussein's government was overthrown, leading to the formation of a new IFA committee.

The IFA revealed on 6 May that it was considering holding a play-off between the top four Baghdad clubs to decide who would qualify for the 2003 Arab Unified Club Championship. However, the IFA then announced on 30 May that Al-Shorta had been chosen to participate as they were leading the league table at the end of round 27 before the outbreak of war. The IFA later announced that the 2002–03 league competition had been cancelled and that the league table at the end of round 27 would also be used to determine the clubs that qualified for the Baghdad Championship and the AFC Champions League.

== League table used to determine qualifications ==
Pos	Team	Pld	W	D	L	GF	GA	GD	Pts	Qualification
1	Al-Shorta	27	20	5	2	61	23	+38	65	2004 AFC Champions League and 2003 Arab Unified Club Championship
2	Al-Najaf	26	19	5	2	44	12	+32	62	
3	Al-Zawraa	27	17	8	2	59	16	+43	59	2003–04 Arab Champions League
4	Al-Talaba	24	19	2	3	56	15	+41	59	2003–04 Arab Champions League
5	Al-Quwa Al-Jawiya	27	17	4	6	49	30	+19	55	2004 AFC Champions League (Note: The IFA initially planned to admit Al-Najaf into the AFC Champions League, but later deemed that Al-Najaf were not ready to participate and thus gave the slot to Al-Quwa Al-Jawiya, the next highest-placed team in the table that had not already been admitted into a continental or regional competition. When informed by the Asian Football Confederation (AFC) that participation in the AFC Champions League should be for the league champions and the FA Cup winners (Al-Talaba), the IFA asked the AFC to give it freedom in choosing its participating clubs due to the league not being completed. The AFC agreed to the IFA's request and therefore Al-Quwa Al-Jawiya entered the competition alongside Al-Shorta.)
6	Al-Minaa	27	14	3	10	30	23	+7	45	
7	Al-Mosul	27	11	5	11	33	42	−9	38	
8	Erbil	27	10	7	10	44	33	+11	37	
9	Al-Karkh	27	9	10	8	29	21	+8	37	
10	Zakho	27	9	9	9	36	27	+9	36	
11	Duhok	27	9	7	11	30	40	−10	34	
12	Al-Difaa Al-Jawi	27	7	8	12	27	37	−10	29	
13	Samarra	26	7	7	12	26	38	−12	28	
14	Al-Nasiriya	27	7	6	14	27	55	−28	27	
15	Al-Jaish	27	6	8	13	26	42	−16	26	
16	Al-Sinaa	26	4	11	11	17	29	−12	23	
17	Al-Naft	27	4	10	13	21	37	−16	22	
18	Al-Samawa	27	5	7	15	22	52	−30	22	
19	Kirkuk	27	2	9	16	14	48	−34	15	
20	Al-Basra	27	3	5	19	14	45	−31	14	

Source: Ali Al-Sabti Archive

== Results ==
Home \ Away	BSR	DIF	JSH	KAR	MIN	MSL	NFT	NJF	NAS	QWJ	SMA	SHR	SIN	TLB	ZWR	DUH	ERB	KIR	SMR	ZAK
Al-Basra		0–0	2–1	0–1		0–0	0–1				0–1	2–3	2–2	0–1	– (Note: Match results from rounds 28 and 29 (played after the outbreak of war) were not considered in the league table that was used to determine qualifications to other tournaments. This includes the following matches for which the results were confirmed: Al-Basra 1–1 Al-Zawraa; Al-Quwa Al-Jawiya 1–0 Al-Najaf; Al-Zawraa 3–0 Samarra)		1–0	1–1	0–0	
Al-Difaa Al-Jawi			1–0	0–4	0–1	2–0		1–2		2–2	3–2	1–1	1–0	0–4		1–1		– (Note: Match results from rounds 28 and 29 (played after the outbreak of war) were not considered in the league table that was used to determine qualifications to other tournaments. This includes the following matches, for which the results were unconfirmed: Al-Karkh v. Al-Mosul; Al-Shorta v. Al-Difaa Al-Jawi; Al-Difaa Al-Jawi v. Kirkuk; Al-Jaish v. Al-Sinaa)	1–2	0–0
Al-Jaish	1–0			1–1			1–0		2–2	1–2	1–1	4–1	–				1–1	0–0		1–1
Al-Karkh		0–2	2–0		1–0	–	0–0	0–0	5–0	1–1	6–1		0–0	0–5	1–2	1–0	1–0		0–0	1–1
Al-Minaa	2–0	1–0	2–1	1–0		4–1		0–0	1–2	2–0	3–0		1–0	1–0		1–0		4–1		1–0
Al-Mosul		0–0	1–3	1–0	1–0		2–2	2–1	2–1	0–1	3–1	1–1		1–4	2–1	1–2	3–1		2–1	
Al-Naft	1–0	0–1	1–2		1–1			1–1	2–1				1–1	0–1	1–3		1–5	3–0	1–1	1–2
Al-Najaf	5–0	1–0	1–0		1–0	3–0			3–0	1–0	4–0		2–1	2–1	0–0	3–1		2–0		
Al-Nasiriya	2–0	0–4		0–0	1–0	1–2		0–1		0–5	0–1	1–1			1–1	2–1	1–1	1–0		1–0
Al-Quwa Al-Jawiya	3–2	2–0	2–1		3–1	2–1	4–0	–	3–1		3–2		1–0		1–1	3–0	2–1	3–0		
Al-Samawa		1–1	3–2		0–1	0–1	0–0	0–1	1–4				1–1	0–3	0–1	2–2	0–0		1–0	
Al-Shorta	4–1	–	1–0	3–1	1–0		2–0	1–1	5–1	3–2	3–0		2–0		1–0	8–0	3–0	2–0	3–2	
Al-Sinaa	1–0		1–0	0–2		2–3	1–1		1–1			1–2		0–1				0–0	3–2	0–0
Al-Talaba	3–1	3–0	5–0		1–1	3–2	2–1		4–1	1–0		2–0			1–1	2–1			4–0	0–1
Al-Zawraa	4–0	4–2	6–0	1–0	1–0		2–0	1–0		5–0	5–0	1–1	0–0			2–0		5–1	–	4–0
Duhok	1–0		1–2	1–1		4–1	1–0	0–3		0–0	3–2	0–1	1–0					2–0	4–1	1–1
Erbil	3–0	3–2		0–0	5–0		1–0	1–2		1–2		0–3	0–0	1–3	1–1	1–1		6–1	4–0	2–1
Kirkuk	0–1	2–2	0–0	1–0		0–0	1–1				0–1		1–1	1–2	1–4	0–1	2–1		0–1	
Samarra	2–1		0–0		2–1		1–1	1–2	3–1	0–2		0–2	0–1		1–1		1–2	4–1		1–0
Zakho	2–0	1–0	4–1			2–0		1–2	6–1	3–0	1–1	2–3	4–0		1–2	1–1	1–3	0–0	0–0	

Source: Ali Al-Sabti Archive
Legend: Blue = home team win; Yellow = draw; Red = away team win.

== Season statistics ==
=== Hat-tricks ===
Player	For	Against	Result	Date
(Iraq) Ahmed Khalaf	Duhok	Al-Mosul	4–1	6 September 2002
(Iraq) Younis Mahmoud	Al-Talaba	Al-Basra	3–1	26 September 2002
(Iraq) Ihsan Hadi	Al-Minaa	Al-Samawa	3–0	10 October 2002
(Iraq) Hamid Qasim^{4}	Erbil	Al-Naft	5–1	11 October 2002
(Iraq) Nashat Akram	Al-Shorta	Duhok	8–0	18 October 2002
(Iraq) Hussam Fawzi	Al-Zawraa	Al-Basra	4–0	1 November 2002
(Iraq) Amin Abbas	Duhok	Samarra	4–1	15 November 2002
(Iraq) Ahmed Ibrahim	Samarra	Al-Nasiriya	3–1	22 November 2002
(Iraq) Ahmed Mnajed	Al-Shorta	Al-Samawa	3–0	29 November 2002
(Iraq) Mohammed Nasser	Erbil	Al-Minaa	5–0	20 December 2002
(Iraq) Husham Mohammed	Al-Zawraa	Kirkuk	5–1	23 December 2002
(Iraq) Basim Hamoud	Al-Jaish	Al-Shorta	4–1	20 February 2003
(Iraq) Salim Khanjar	Zakho	Al-Nasiriya	6–1	7 March 2003
(Iraq) Husham Mohammed	Al-Zawraa	Kirkuk	4–1	7 March 2003
(Iraq) Muayad Judi	Al-Sinaa	Samarra	3–2	7 March 2003

Notes

^{4} Player scored 4 goals
