= Al-Khawarnaq SC =

Iraqi football club

- Full name: Al-Khawarnaq Sport Club
- Founded: 1973; 53 years ago
- Ground: Al-Khawarnaq Stadium
- Capacity: 11,000
- Chairman: Ali Abbas Al-Jubouri
- Manager: Mohammed Younes
- League: Iraqi Third Division League
Home colours	Away colours

Al-Khawarnaq Sport Club (Arabic: نادي الخورنق الرياضي), is an Iraqi football team based in Al-Manathera District, Al-Najaf, that plays in the Iraqi Third Division League.

== History ==
Al-Khawarnaq team played in the Iraqi First Division League in the 2004-05 season, but was eliminated from the Group Stage after collecting 7 points, from 1 win, 4 draws and 7 losses.

== Stadium ==
In 2009, the Ministry of Youth and Sports began working on rehabilitating and developing Al-Khawarnaq Stadium with an amount of 3 billion IQD, but the work was delayed and many technical irregularities and problems appeared.

== Managerial history ==
- (Iraq) Alwan Mana
- (Iraq) Mohammed Younes

== See also ==
- 1998–99 Iraq FA Cup
