= Simele SC =

Iraqi football club

- Full name: Simele Sport Club
- Founded: 1991; 34 years ago
- Ground: Simele Stadium
- Chairman: Mohammed Ramadhan
- League: Iraqi Third Division League
Home colours	Away colours

Simele Sport Club (Arabic: نادي سميل الرياضي), is an Iraqi football team based in Simele, Duhok that competes in the Iraqi Third Division League and Kurdistan Premier League.

== Managerial history ==
- (Romania) Marian Mihail (2012–2013)
- (Iraq) Hazem Salih (2013–2014)

== See also ==
- 1998–99 Iraq FA Cup
- 1999–2000 Iraq FA Cup
- 2001–02 Iraq FA Cup
- 2002–03 Iraq FA Cup
