= Khanaqin SC =

Iraqi football club

- Full name: Khanaqin Sport Club
- Nickname(s): أبناء جسر الوند
- Founded: 1975; 50 years ago
- Ground: Hussein Mansour Stadium
- Capacity: 500
- Owner: PUK
- Chairman: Hussein Shirzad
- Manager: Khaled Wali Hassan
- League: Iraqi Third Division League
Home colours	Away colours

Khanaqin Sport Club (Arabic: نادي خانقين الرياضي), is an Iraqi football team based in Khanaqin, Diyala, that plays in Iraqi Third Division League and Kurdistan Premier League.

== Managerial history ==
- (Iraq) Khaled Wali Hassan

== See also ==
- 2000–01 Iraqi Elite League
- 2001–02 Iraq FA Cup
- 2002–03 Iraq FA Cup
