= Al-Musayyib SC =

Iraqi football club

- Full name: Al-Musayyib Sport Club
- Founded: 1969; 57 years ago
- Ground: Al-Musayyib Stadium
- Chairman: Ridha Aboudi Al-Jaroush
- Manager: Mustafa Mohammed Ridha
- League: Iraqi Third Division League
Home colours	Away colours

Al-Musayyib Sport Club (Arabic: نادي المسيّب الرياضي), is an Iraqi football team based in Al-Musayab District, Babil, that plays in Iraqi Third Division League.

== Al-Musayyib Sports City Stadium ==
In the April 2020–21 season, the club's honorary president announced plans to build a sports complex called Al-Musayyib Sports City, which will include an Olympic stadium and swimming pool as well as a multi-purpose gymnasium, 10,000,000,000 IQD have been allocated as a first stage to start.

== Managerial history ==
- (Iraq) Ali Jawad
- (Iraq) Ahmed Hassan Samin
- (Iraq) Ali Ismail
- (Iraq) Mustafa Mohammed Ridha

== See also ==
- 1992–93 Iraq FA Cup
- 1998–99 Iraq FA Cup
- 2001–02 Iraq FA Cup
- 2002–03 Iraq FA Cup
- 2020–21 Iraq FA Cup
