= Brusk SC =

Iraqi football club

- Full name: Brusk Sport Club
- Founded: 1956; 69 years ago (as a team); 1984; 41 years ago (as a club)
- Ground: Brusk Stadium
- Chairman: Tariq Abdul-Rahn
- Manager: Delshad Maarouf
- League: Iraqi Third Division League
Home colours	Away colours

Brusk Sport Club (Arabic: نادي بروسك الرياضي) is an Iraqi football team based in Erbil, that plays in Iraqi Third Division League and Kurdistan Premier League.

== Managerial history ==
- (Iraq) Delshad Maarouf
- (Iraq) Nazar Akram

== Famous players ==
- Ali Hussein Shihab (1995–2000)

== Honours ==
=== Domestic ===
- Kurdistan Premier League
  - Winners (2): 2007–08, 2008–09

== See also ==
- 2001–02 Iraq FA Cup
- 2002–03 Iraq FA Cup
