= Aso SC =

Iraqi football club

- Full name: Aso Sport Club
- Founded: 1994; 31 years ago
- Ground: Aso Stadium
- Chairman: Hazem Kadhim
- Manager: Amanj Mahmoud
- League: Iraqi Third Division League
Home colours	Away colours

Aso Sport Club (Arabic: نادي آسو الرياضي, Kurdish: یانەی وەرزشی ئاسۆ) is an Iraqi football team based in Erbil, that plays in Iraqi Third Division League and Kurdistan Premier League.

Aso played in the Iraqi First Division League in the 2004-05 season.

== Managerial history ==
- (Iraq) Kameran Jabbar
- (Iraq) Sarmand Aziz
- (Iraq) Amanj Mahmoud

== See also ==
- 2001–02 Iraq FA Cup
- 2002–03 Iraq FA Cup
