= Al-Rifai SC =

Iraqi football club

- Full name: Al-Rifai Sport Club
- Founded: 1972; 53 years ago
- Ground: Al-Rifai Stadium
- Chairman: Karim Jaber Fayrouz
- Manager: Haider Radhi
- League: Iraqi Third Division League
Home colours	Away colours

Al-Rifai Sport Club (Arabic: نادي الرفاعي الرياضي) is an Iraqi football team based in Al-Rifa'i, Dhi Qar, that plays in Iraqi Third Division League.

== Managerial history ==
- (Iraq) Rasheed Sayer
- (Iraq) Hader Jassim
- (Iraq) Haider Radhi

== See also ==
- 2001–02 Iraq FA Cup
- 2002–03 Iraq FA Cup
- 2021–22 Iraq FA Cup
