= Al-Muwafaqiya SC =

Iraqi football club

- Full name: Al-Muwafaqiya Sport Club
- Founded: 1995; 31 years ago
- Ground: Al-Muwafaqiya Olympic Stadium
- Chairman: Shaker Masir
- Manager: Saad Rebeh
- League: Iraqi Third Division League
Home colours	Away colours

Al-Muwafaqiya Sport Club (Arabic: نادي الموفقية الرياضي), is an Iraqi football team based in Wasit, that plays in the Iraqi Third Division League.

== History ==
Al-Muwafaqiya Club was established in the Al-Muwafaqiya District in Wasit Governorate in 1995, and participated in the Iraq FA Cup in the 2001–02 and 2002–03 seasons. After several seasons, the team was able to qualify to play in the Iraqi First Division League. In the 2018–19 season, the team played in the Iraqi First Division League under the leadership of coach Ali Mansour and his assistants, Jabbar Ghafel and Adel Ataiwi, but could not qualify for the Iraqi Premier League after losing against Al-Numaniya 1–0 in the final stage.

Sports activity in Iraq stopped in March 2020 due to the COVID pandemic, and the 2019–20 Iraqi First Division League season was not held, then the Iraqi leagues returned to resume their activities in September 2020. In the 2020–21 season, the team played in the qualifying round for the Iraqi First Division League under the leadership of coach Hussam Alwan. In the first stage, the team was able to top its group and qualify for the second stage, after collecting 14 points. In the first match in the second stage of the league, the team managed to beat Al-Nasiriya 2–1, but then lost its matches and was unable to qualify for the final stage. In the final match, the team lost to Al-Nasiriya 2–0, after the number of players' injuries increased, and the number of substitute players was not enough to complete the lineup, then the referee ended the match in favor of Al-Nasiriya.

== Managerial history ==
- (Iraq) Ali Mansour
- (Iraq) Hussam Alwan
- (Iraq) Saad Rebeh

== See also ==
- 2001–02 Iraq FA Cup
- 2002–03 Iraq FA Cup
