= Al-Madain SC =

Iraqi football club

- Full name: Al-Madain Sport Club
- Founded: 1996; 29 years ago
- Ground: Al-Madain Stadium
- Chairman: Yassin Ahmed Salih
- League: Iraqi Third Division League
Home colours	Away colours

Al-Madain Sport Club (Arabic: نادي المدائن الرياضي), is an Iraqi football team based in Baghdad, that plays in the Iraqi Third Division League.

== History ==
Al-Madain team played in the Iraqi Premier League qualifiers in the 2000–01 season for the first time in its history in the Baghdad Group 1. The team was not ready, it won one match, drew one match, lost all their other matches, and came to the bottom of the group standings, and their match against Al-Zawraa recorded one of the largest results in Iraqi football history when they lost 11–1.

== See also ==
- 2000–01 Iraqi Elite League
- 2001–02 Iraq FA Cup
