= Alaa Nayrouz =

Iraqi footballer and coach

Personal information
- Full name: Alaa Nayrouz Oraij
- Date of birth: 17 June 1983 (age 43)
- Place of birth: Basra, Iraq
- Position: Midfielder

Team information
- Current team: Naft Al-Junoob (Administrative director)

Youth career
- 1999–2001: Al-Minaa

Senior career*
Years	Team	Apps	(Gls)
2001–2002	Al-Minaa		
2002–2005	Al-Talaba		
2005–2006	Nejmeh		
2006–2007	Al-Fotuwa		
2007–2008	Erbil		
2008–2009	Naft Al-Janoob		
2009	Rah Ahan		
2010–2011	Naft Al-Janoob		

International career
2007	Iraq B	4	(0)

Managerial career
- 2016–2020: Naft Al-Junoob (Assist. coach)
- 2020–: Naft Al-Junoob (Administrative director)
- * Club domestic league appearances and goals

Alaa Nayrouz (Arabic: علاء نيروز, born June 16, 1983, in Basra) is a coach and former international Iraqi football player, he played as a midfielder.

Nayrouz is currently working as assistant coach for Naft Al-Janoob club.

== Honors ==
Al-Talaba

- Iraqi Premier League: 2001–02
- Iraq FA Cup: 2001–02, 2002–03
- Iraqi Super Cup: 2002

Erbil

- Iraqi Premier League: 2007–08
