= Al-Hurriya SC (Iraq) =

Iraqi football club

- Full name: Al-Hurriya Sport Club
- Founded: 1992; 34 years ago
- Ground: Al-Ghazaliya Stadium
- Chairman: Ali Sahib
- Manager: Hamed Al-Sayyed
- League: Iraqi Third Division League
Home colours	Away colours

Al-Hurriya Sport Club (Arabic: نادي الحرية الرياضي), is an Iraqi football team based in Al-Hurriya, Baghdad.

== Managerial history ==
- (Iraq) Mohammed Razzaq
- (Iraq) Hamed Al-Sayyed

== See also ==
- 2000–01 Iraqi Elite League
- 2001–02 Iraq FA Cup
- 2002–03 Iraq FA Cup
