= Al-Rumaitha SC =

Iraqi football club

- Full name: Al-Rumaitha Sport Club
- Founded: 1967; 58 years ago
- Ground: Al-Taarof Stadium
- Chairman: Ibrahim Mizher Al-Jumaily
- Manager: Abdul-Hussein Bashi
- League: Iraqi Third Division League
Home colours	Away colours

Al-Rumaitha Sport Club (Arabic: نادي الرميثة الرياضي), is an Iraqi football team based in Al-Rumaitha District, Al-Muthanna, that plays in the Iraqi Third Division League.

== Managerial history ==
- (Iraq) Alaa Nima
- (Iraq) Ghiath Malik
- (Iraq) Abdul-Hussein Bashi

== See also ==
- 1996–97 Iraq FA Cup
- 2000–01 Iraqi Elite League
- 2001–02 Iraq FA Cup
