= Al-Sadda SC =

Iraqi football club

- Full name: Al-Sadda Football Club
- Founded: 2000; 25 years ago
- Ground: Al-Sadda Stadium
- Chairman: Munir Hameed Al-Ansari
- Manager: Hussam Nima
- League: Iraqi Third Division League
Home colours	Away colours

Al-Sadda Sport Club (Arabic: نادي السدة الرياضي) is an Iraqi football team based in Babil, that plays in Iraqi Third Division League.

== Managerial history ==
- (Iraq) Maitham Dael-Haq
- (Iraq) Ali Ubayyes
- (Iraq) Hussam Nima

== See also ==
- 2001–02 Iraq FA Cup
- 2002–03 Iraq FA Cup
- 2020–21 Iraq FA Cup
