= Al-Nahdha SC =

Iraqi football club

- Full name: Al-Nahdha Sport Club
- Founded: 1958; 67 years ago
- Ground: Al-Tahaddi Stadium
- Chairman: Jassim Majeed Jodah
- Manager: Fadhel Luaibi
- League: Iraqi Third Division League
| Home colours | Away colours |

Al-Nahdha Sport Club (Arabic: نادي النهضة الرياضي), is an Iraqi football team based in Karrada, Baghdad, that plays in the Iraqi Third Division League.

== History ==
Al-Nahdha team was promoted to the Iraqi Premier League in the 2005–06 season, but withdrew from the league because they did not have an independent stadium.

== Managerial history ==
- (Iraq) Sabah Abdul-Jalil
- (Iraq) Saadi Toma
- (Iraq) Jassim Hameed Segar
- (Iraq) Jabbar Hameed
- (Iraq) Nasser Noumy
- (Iraq) Sultan Ghafil
- (Iraq) Fadhel Luaibi

== See also ==
- 1999–2000 Iraq FA Cup
- 2001–02 Iraq FA Cup
- 2002–03 Iraq FA Cup
