= Al-Khidhir SC =

Iraqi football club

- Full name: Al-Khidhir Sport Club
- Founded: 1973; 53 years ago
- Ground: Al-Khidhir Stadium
- Chairman: Abbas Swaichet Hussein
- Manager: Mohammed Junaih
- League: Iraqi Second Division League
- 2025–26: Iraqi Second Division League, 17th of 20
Home colours	Away colours

Al-Khidhir Sport Club (Arabic: نادي الخضر الرياضي), is an Iraqi football team based in Al-Khidhir District, Al-Muthanna, that plays in the Iraqi Second Division League.

== Managerial history ==
- (Iraq) Hussein Jassim
- (Iraq) Mohammed Swadi
- (Iraq) Mohammed Junaih

== See also ==
- 2001–02 Iraq FA Cup
- 2002–03 Iraq FA Cup
