= Abu Ghraib SC =

Iraqi football club

- Full name: Abu Ghraib Sport Club
- Founded: 1990; 35 years ago
- Ground: Abu Ghraib Stadium
- Chairman: Hussein Al-Zawbaee
- Manager: Shukor Ali
- League: Iraqi Third Division League
Home colours	Away colours

Abu Ghraib Sport Club (Arabic: نادي أبو غريب الرياضي), is an Iraqi football team based in Abu Ghraib District, Baghdad.

== Managerial history ==
- (Iraq) Qasim Jaber
- (Iraq) Shukor Ali

== See also ==
- 2016–17 Iraq FA Cup
- 2020–21 Iraq FA Cup
