= Al-Muthanna SC =

Iraqi football club

- Full name: Al-Muthanna Sport Club
- Founded: 1973; 52 years ago
- Ground: Al-Muthanna Stadium
- Chairman: Ali Matar Wajid
- Manager: Hussein Jassim
- League: Iraqi Third Division League
Home colours	Away colours

Al-Muthanna Sport Club (Arabic: نادي المثنى الرياضي) is an Iraqi football team based in Al-Muthanna, that plays in Iraqi Third Division League.

== Managerial history ==
- (Iraq) Rahman Harbi
- (Iraq) Fares Attiyah
- (Iraq) Adel Jaber Al-Mayyali
- (Iraq) Hussein Jassim

== See also ==
- 2001–02 Iraq FA Cup
- 2002–03 Iraq FA Cup
- 2018–19 Iraq FA Cup
- 2021–22 Iraq FA Cup
