= Daquq SC =

Iraqi football club

- Full name: Daquq Sport Club
- Founded: 1995; 30 years ago
- Ground: Daquq Stadium
- Chairman: Burhan Askar
- Manager: Haider Ahmed
- League: Iraqi Third Division League
Home colours	Away colours

Daquq Sport Club (Arabic: نادي داقوق الرياضي), is an Iraqi football team based in Daquq District, Kirkuk, that plays in the Iraqi Third Division League.

== Rivalries ==
The Daquq SC–Al-Hawija SC rivalry is a rivalry between Kirkuk-based association football clubs Daquq and Al-Hawija.

== Managerial history ==
- (Iraq) Haider Ahmed

== See also ==
- 2001–02 Iraq FA Cup
