= Al-Basra SC =

Iraqi football team

- Full name: Al-Basra Sport club
- Founded: 1992; 33 years ago
- Ground: Al-Basra Stadium
- Chairman: Alaa Sharhan
- Manager: Mohammed Khudhair
- League: Iraqi Third Division League
Home colours	Away colours

Al-Basra Sport Club (Arabic: نادي البصرة الرياضي) is an Iraqi football team based in Al-Jamhoriya, Basra.

== History ==
=== in Premier League ===
The Al-Basra team played in the Iraqi Premier League for the first time in the 2002–03 season, and they weren't good enough, and it was at the bottom of the standings, but there was no relegation in the league. So they returned in the next season with the same level and bottom of the standings, and there was no relegation either, where the league stopped due to the war and in their third season In the Premier League, the 2004–05 season was a bad season for the team as well, and in the end, the team was eliminated from the Group Stage and relegated to the Iraqi First Division League.

== Managerial history ==
- (Iraq) Bassam Khairallah
- (Iraq) Mustafa Mejaiser
- (Iraq) Hussam Lafta
- (Iraq) Mohammed Khudhair

== See also ==
- 1999–2000 Iraq FA Cup
- 2001–02 Iraq FA Cup
- 2002–03 Iraq FA Cup
