= Bassim Abdul-Hassan =

Iraqi footballer (born 1974)

Personal information
- Full name: Bassim Abdul-Hassan Khudhair
- Date of birth: 17 January 1974 (age 52)
- Place of birth: Iraq
- Position: Midfielder

International career
Years	Team	Apps	(Gls)
2001	Iraq	5	(0)

Bassim Abdul-Hassan Khudhair (Arabic: بَاسِم عَبْد الْحُسَيْن خُضَيْر; born 17 January 1974) is an Iraqi former football defender who played for Iraq at the 2001 FIFA World Youth Championship.

Abdul-Hassan made 5 appearances for the national team in 2001.
