= Ghazi Fahad =

Iraqi footballer and coach

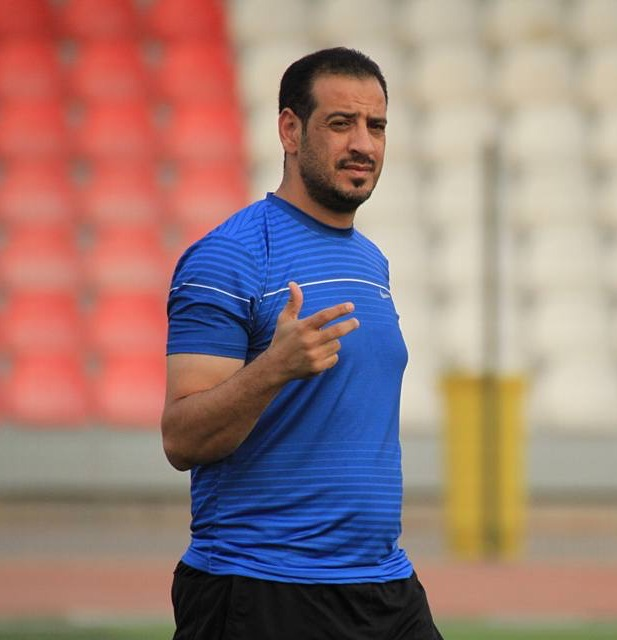

Personal information
- Full name: Ghazi Fahad Khazaal Al Shammari
- Date of birth: 6 November 1978 (age 47)
- Place of birth: Basra, Iraq
- Position: Midfielder

Team information
- Current team: Al-Karma

Youth career
- –1995: Al-Rafidain

Senior career*
Years	Team	Apps	(Gls)
1995–1996	Al-Zubair		
1996–2001	Al-Minaa		
2001–2002	Duhok		
2002–2003	Al-Zawraa		
2004–2005	Al-Minaa		
2006–2007	Duhok		

International career
2002	Iraq	5	(0)

Managerial career
- 2007–2022: Al Ain (U21 team Head Coach)
- 2013: Al-Minaa (caretaker)
- 2017: Al-Minaa (caretaker)
- 2019–2020: Al Ain (caretaker)
- 2022–2023: Erbil
- 2023–2024: Ittihad Kalba (U-21 Head Coach)
- 2024: Ittihad Kalba
- 2024-: Al-Karma
- * Club domestic league appearances and goals

Ghazi Fahad (Arabic: غازي فهد; born 1978) is former international Iraqi football player, He is the current manager of Iraqi Stars League side Al-Karma. As a player, Fahad was a midfielder who earned five caps for the Iraqi national team.

== Playing career ==
Ghazi started his playing career at Basra club Al-Zubayr, where he was scouted by Al Minaa manager Hadi Ahmed who signed him for the first team. Ghazi made his debut against Al Quwa Al Jawiya and remained an important player for the club in all four seasons he spent there. Ghazi then moved to Duhok SC for one season playing under Natiq Hashim. The player showed his quality in many matches including one against his former team Al Minaa where he scored. Following his season with Duhok, Ghazi wanted a move to a Baghdad club in order to improve his chance of making the national team, his first choice was Al Quwa Al Jawiya, but he failed to agree to a contract and signed for rivals Al-Zawraa instead. In the Baghdadi club, Ghazi Fahad continued his impressive performances and finally received a call-up to the Iraqi national football team in 2002, where he won the 2002 West Asian Football Federation Championship.

Fahad Ghazi returned to Al Minaa and helped the team achieve 2nd place in the 2004–05 Iraqi Premier League. Ghazi returned once again to Duhok SC and spent a season with the Kurdish club. Following their elimination in the second round of the 2006–07 Iraqi Premier League, Ghazi Fahad retired and joined the coaching staff at Al Ain.

== Managerial career ==
=== Early managerial career and caretaker roles ===
Following his retirement, Ghazi joined Al Ain's youth setup as a coach, and was eventually promoted to the head of academy in 2009. As a coach, Ghazi is credited to having scouted and neutered Emirati superstar Omar Abdulrahman. In 2013 Al Ain agreed to loan Ghazi Fahad to his boyhood club Al Minaa for six months. Ghazi managed the team for 11 matches, winning five and losing five, while achieving a draw in the remaining one. He cut his time short after only four months due to receiving death threats.

Ghazi returned to coach Al Minaa once again in 2017, replacing Romanian Ion Marin. The Manager led Al Mina'a to a sixth-place finish, winning four of the nine matches he was in charge for. Following his performances as a manager, Al Mina'a signed him on a full-time contract to manage the club for the 2017–18 season. However he resigned before the start of the season due to a dispute with club president Jalil Hanoon. Fahad returned to manage the under 21 side at Al-Ain following his stint with Al Mina'a. In late 2019 Fahad was appointed caretaker manager of Al-Ain following the sacking of Ivan Leko. He led the team in three matches, winning two.

=== First team roles at Erbil, Kalba, and Al-Karma ===
In 2022, Fahad resigned from his post as coach of the Under 21 side at Al-Ain in order to become the head coach of Erbil SC. Fahad resigned in February following a 4–0 defeat against Al-Sinaa SC, which extended his winless run at the club to 7 matches.

Following his failed stint with Erbil, Fahad returned to the United Arab Emirates, this time with Ittihad Kalba, where he was appointed as their U-21 coach ahead of the 2023–24 season. On March 2nd 2024, Fahad was promoted to manage the first team after the sacking of Iranian head coach Farhad Majidi, who had the team in 12th position and in danger of relegation. Fahad was able to guide the team to safety after winning 15 points in the remaining 11 matches.

Ahead of the 2024–25 season, Fahad returned to Iraq, this time with newly promoted Al-Karma SC.

== Managerial statistics ==
As of 8 November 2024

Team	Nat	From	To	Record				
Team	Nat	From	To	G	W	D	L	Win %
Al-Minaa	(Iraq)	22 February 2013	13 May 2013	7	4	0	3	57.14
Al-Minaa	(Iraq)	24 April 2017	4 September 2017	12	5	5	2	41.67
Al Ain (Caretaker)	(United Arab Emirates)	21 December 2019	5 January 2020	3	2	0	1	66.67
Erbil SC	(Iraq)	22 October 2022	6 February 2023	11	3	4	4	27.27
Ittihad Kalba	(United Arab Emirates)	2 March 2024	7 June 2024	11	4	3	4	36.36
Al-Karma SC	(Iraq)	01 September 2024	present	7	4	1	2	57.14
Total				51	22	13	16	43.14

== Honours ==
=== Player ===
==== Club ====
- Iraqi Premier League
  - Runner up 2004–05 with Al Minaa

==== International ====
- WAFF Championship:
  - Winner in 2002

=== Manager ===
Individual

- Iraq Stars League Manager of the Month: November 2024
