= Qais Essa =

Iraqi footballer

Personal information
- Full name: Qais Essa Hussein
- Date of birth: 1 January 1975 (age 51)
- Place of birth: Basra, Iraq
- Position: Right-back

Senior career*
Years	Team	Apps	(Gls)
1994–1996	Al-Minaa		
1996–2003	Al-Shorta		
2003–2005	Al-Minaa		
2005–2007	Al-Najaf		
2007–2014	Naft Al-Janoob		
2014	Naft Al-Wasat		

International career
1996–	Iraq U23		
- * Club domestic league appearances and goals

Qais Essa Hussein (Arabic: قَيْس عِيسَى حُسَيْن; born 1975) was an Iraqi international football player, who played with the Iraqi national football team in 1996 Summer Olympics qualifying.

== Honors ==
=== Club ===
Al-Minaa

- Iraqi Premier League runner-up: 2004–05

Al-Shorta

- Iraq FA Cup runner-up: 2001–02, 2002–03
- Baghdad Championship: 2000–01, 2001–02, 2002–03

Al-Najaf

- Iraqi Premier League runner-up: 2005–06
