= Al-Khalis SC =

Iraqi football club

- Full name: Al-Khalis Sport Club
- Founded: 1969; 57 years ago
- Ground: Al-Khalis Stadium
- Chairman: Haider Saud
- Manager: Nasser Kamel Mohammed
- League: Iraqi Third Division League
- 2025–26: Iraqi Second Division League, 18th of 20 (relegated)
Home colours	Away colours

Al-Khalis Sport Club (Arabic: نادي الخالص الرياضي), is an Iraqi football team based in Diyala that plays in the Iraqi Third Division League, which is the fifth tier of the Iraqi football league system.

== Managerial history ==
- (Iraq) Ibrahim Ali Yas
- (Iraq) Nasser Kamel Mohammed

== See also ==
- 2002–03 Iraq FA Cup
- 2020–21 Iraq FA Cup
