= Mohannad Nassir =

Iraqi footballer

Personal information
- Full name: Mohannad Nassir
- Date of birth: 13 July 1980 (age 46)
- Place of birth: Iraq
- Position: Midfielder

Team information
- Current team: Al-Talaba
- Number: 26

Senior career*
Years	Team	Apps	(Gls)
2004–2010	Al-Zawraa		
2008–2010	Duhok SC		
2010–2012	Al-Zawraa		
2012–2013	Al-Talaba		
2013	Najaf		

International career^{‡}
2009	Iraq	1	(0)
- * Club domestic league appearances and goals ‡ National team caps and goals as of 31 May 2009

Mohannad Nassir (Arabic: مُهَنَّد نَاصِر; born 13 July 1980) is an Iraqi former football (soccer) midfielder who last played for Najaf.

Mohanad Nassir was a regular in the 2000 Asian Youth Championship winning team in Tehran. A few months before the finals in Tehran, the Al-Zawraa midfielder was called up by Milan Zivadinovic's assistant Barja Maric into the Iraqi B team, playing in an international tournament in Indonesia.
