= Ahmed Hussein Adan =

Iraqi footballer

Ahmed Hussein
Personal information
- Full name: Ahmed Hussein Adan
- Date of birth: 1 July 1977 (age 49)
- Place of birth: Iraq
- Position: Midfielder

Senior career*
Years	Team	Apps	(Gls)
- Al-Zawraa

International career
1997–2000	Iraq	4	(0)
- * Club domestic league appearances and goals

Ahmed Hussein (born 1 July 1977) is an Iraqi football midfielder who played for Iraq in the 2000 Asian Cup. He also played for Al-Zawraa.

He played for the Iraq national team between 1997 and 2000.
