= University of Mosul Stadium =

Stadium in Mosul, Iraq

Coordinates: 36°20′28″N 43°06′55″E

- University of Mosul Stadium in 2018
- Interactive map of University of Mosul Stadium

University of Mosul Stadium, is a multi-use stadium in Mosul, Iraq. It is currently used mostly for football matches and serves as the home stadium of Mosul FC. The stadium holds 5,000 people.

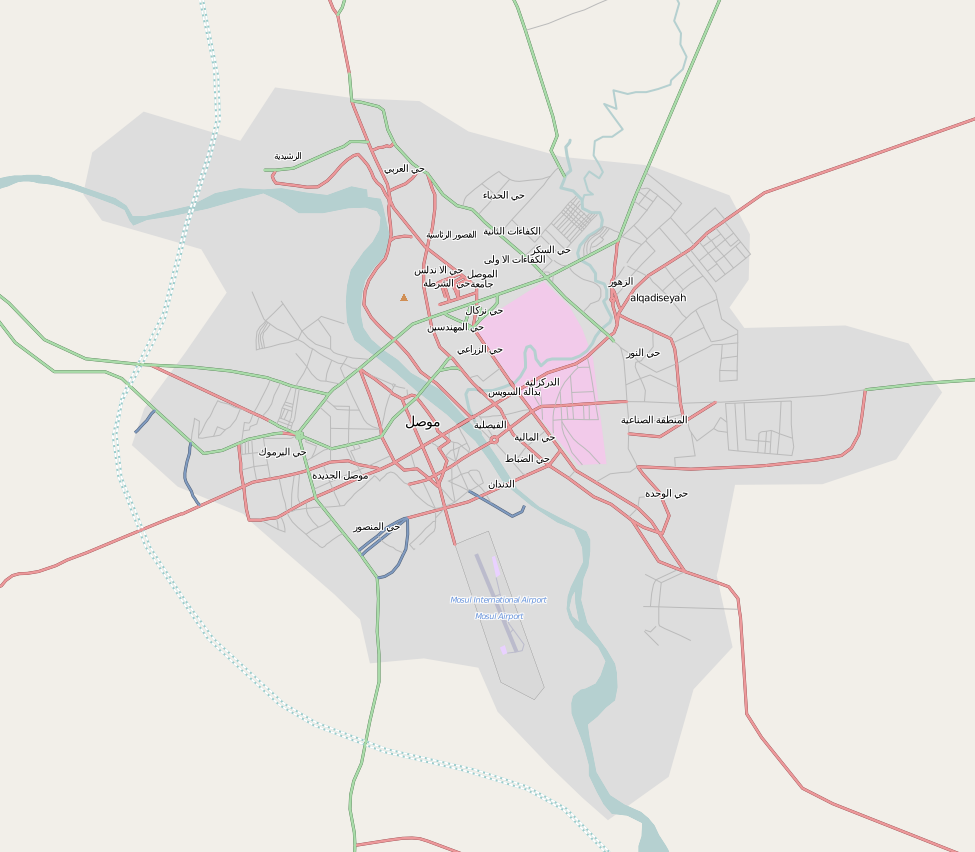
University of Mosul Stadium (Mosul)

== See also ==
- List of football stadiums in Iraq
