= Tikrit Stadium =

Stadium in Tikrit, Iraq

Coordinates: 34.595996°N 43.683671°E

Tikrit Stadium is a multi-use stadium in Tikrit, Iraq. It is used mostly for football matches and serves as the home stadium of Salah ad Din FC. The stadium holds 10,000 people.
