= Samarra Stadium =

Stadium in Iraq

Coordinates: 34°12′00″N 43°53′05″E

Samarra Stadium ملعب سامراء
- Interactive map of Samarra Stadium ملعب سامراء
- Full name: Samarra Stadium
- Location: Samarra, Iraq
- Owner: Ministry of Youth and Sports (Iraq)
- Capacity: 8,000
- Surface: Artificial turf
- Scoreboard: Yes
- Field size: 105 m × 68 m

Tenant
- Samarra FC

Samarra Stadium, is a multi-use stadium in Samarra, Iraq. It is currently used mostly for football matches and serves as the home stadium of Samaraa FC. The stadium holds 8,000 people.

== See also ==
- List of football stadiums in Iraq
