= Balad SC =

Iraqi football club

- Full name: Balad Sport Club
- Nickname(s): Abnaa Sayed Mohammed (Son of Sayed Mohammed)
- Founded: 1989; 36 years ago
- Ground: Balad Stadium
- Chairman: Ridha Adnan
- Manager: Natiq Mohammed
- League: Iraqi Third Division League
Home colours	Away colours

Balad Sport Club (Arabic: نادي بلد الرياضي), is an Iraqi football team based in Balad District, Saladin, that plays in the Iraqi Third Division League.

== History ==
=== The establishing ===
Balad Sport Club was established in 1989 after appeals and demands from the people of Balad to establish a club that officially represents the city. The club was established by an elite of the city's intellectuals after submitting the application for founding to the Iraqi Football Association, and the club was established after the official approval of the Football Association directly.

=== In Premier League ===
Balad played in the Iraqi Premier League for the first time in the 2004–05 season, and finished 7th in Group Stage, won 6 matches, drew 3 and lost 7, and relegated to the Iraqi First Division League.

== See also ==
- 2020–21 Iraq FA Cup
- 2021–22 Iraq FA Cup
