= Al-Mahmoudiya SC =

Iraqi football club

- Full name: Al-Mahmoudiya Sport Club
- Founded: 1991; 34 years ago
- Ground: Al-Mahmoudiya Stadium
- Chairman: Salem Swadi Al-Gharrawi
- Manager: Waleed Khalid
- League: Iraqi Third Division League
Home colours	Away colours

Al-Mahmoudiya Sport Club (Arabic: نادي المحمودية الرياضي), is an Iraqi football team based in Baghdad, that plays in the Iraqi Third Division League.

== Managerial history ==
- (Iraq) Ali Wahab
- (Iraq) Uday Ghawi
- (Iraq) Waleed Khalid

== See also ==
- 2002–03 Iraq FA Cup
- 2020–21 Iraq FA Cup
