= Pires SC =

Iraqi football club

- Full name: Pires Sports Club
- Founded: 1996
- Dissolved: 2010; 16 years ago
- Final season; 2009–10: Iraqi Premier League, 16th in Group A (relegated)
Home colours	Away colours

Pires Sports Club (Arabic: نادي بيرس الرياضي) was a sports club based in Duhok, Iraqi Kurdistan, Iraq.

== History ==
=== In Premier League ===
The club participated in the Iraqi Premier League for the first time in the 2003–04 season. The following season, the club was relegated to the Iraqi First Division League. The club was promoted back to the Premier League in 2007–08 and had its most successful season by reaching the Elite Stage.

At the halfway point of the 2009–10 season, Pires withdrew from the league and the club was dissolved. A new club, Zeravani SC, was founded in 2011 from the remnants of Pires SC.
