= Al-Difaa Al-Jawi SC =

Iraqi football club

- Full name: Al-Difaa Al-Jawi Sport Club
- Founded: 1994; 32 years ago
- Ground: Al-Ghazaliya Stadium
- Chairman: Maan Zaid Al-Saadi
- Manager: Haitham Kadhim
- League: Iraqi Third Division League
Home colours	Away colours

Al-Difaa Al-Jawi Sport Club (Arabic: نادي الدفاع الجوي الرياضي) is an Iraqi football team based in Baghdad, that plays in Iraqi Third Division League.

== History ==
=== In Premier League ===
Al-Difaa Al-Jawi team played in the Iraqi Premier League for the first time in the 1999–2000 season, and it lasted for six seasons in the Premier League until the 2004–05 season, at the end of which it was relegated to the Iraqi First Division League. The team played its first four seasons in the name of Al-Difaa Al-Jawi, and in the last two seasons in the league the name of the club was changed, and it played in the league under the name Al-Estiqlal.

=== Re-establishment ===
After the team's exit from the Iraqi Premier League in 2005, its sports activities were suspended and the situation continued until 2021, when the club was re-established in that year under its first name (Al-Difaa Al-Jawi) and a new administrative body was elected, and multiple sports teams were formed, including the football team, which is currently playing in the Iraqi Second Division League.

== Managerial history ==
- (Iraq) Hakeem Shaker (1997–1999)
- (Iraq) Saleh Radhi (1999–2002)
- (Iraq) Salam Hashim (2002–2003)
- (Iraq) Haitham Kadhim (2022–present)

== Famous players ==
- (Iraq) Younis Abed Ali
- (Iraq) Ali Mutashar
- (Iraq) Wissam Zaki
- (Iraq) Samal Saeed
- (Iraq) Samer Saeed

== Honours ==
- Al-Quds International Championship
  - Winner (1): 1999

== Other sports ==
=== Basketball ===
- Iraqi Basketball Premier League:
  - Champions (5): 1997–98, 1998–99, 2023–24, 2024–25, 2025–26
