= Al-Shuala SC =

Iraqi football club

Al Shuala
- Full name: Al Shuala Sport Club
- Founded: 1992; 34 years ago
- League: Iraqi Third Division League

Al Shuala (The Flame, Arabic: نادي الشعلة الرياضي) is an Iraqi football team based in Baghdad. They play in the Iraqi Third Division League.
