= Samarra SC =

Iraqi football club

Samarra Sport Club
- Full name: Samarra Sport Club
- Nickname(s): Abnaa Al-Malwiya (Sons of Malwiya)
- Founded: 1973; 52 years ago
- Ground: Samarra Stadium
- Capacity: 8,000
- Chairman: Saddam Azeez
- Manager: Ayoub Younes
- League: Iraqi First Division League
Home colours	Away colours

Samarra Sport Club (Arabic: نادي سامراء الرياضي) is an Iraqi professional football club based in Samarra. Founded in 1973, the club competes in Iraqi First Division League.

== History ==
=== In the Iraqi Premier League ===
Samarra played in the Iraqi Premier League for 22 consecutive seasons, starting from the 1989–90 season, where they played for the first time, until the 2010–11 season, when they relegated to the Iraqi First Division League.

=== 2020–21 Season ===
After qualifying for the preliminary round, Samarra in the 2020–21 Iraqi First Division League played 13 matches, winning 8, drawing 3, losing 2 and gaining 27 points to occupy second place behind the leaders Al-Sinaa in Group 2, and qualified for the third place match. In the match to determine the third place, Samarra played against Afak, the second team in Group 1, and defeated them 1–0 to occupy the third place, and qualified for the play-off match, which qualifies for the Iraqi Premier League. In the play-off match, Samarra managed to defeat Al-Sinaat Al-Kahrabaiya on penalties, after the original time of the match ended with a score of 1-1, to officially qualify the team to play in the Iraqi Premier League.

== Managerial history ==
- (Iraq) Zahid Qassim
- (Iraq) Ayoub Younis
- (Iraq) Ahmed Kadhim (2020–2021)
- (Iraq) Sami Bahat (2021)
- (Iraq) Ali Hussien Dawood (2021) (Caretaker)
- (Iraq) Ahmed Kadhim (2021)
- (Iraq) Samer Saeed (2021–2022)
- (Iraq) Moayad Taha (2022)
- (Iraq) Nihad Ghazi (2022)
- (Iraq) Zahed Qasim (2022–2023)
- (Iraq) Ali Wahab (2023)
- (Iraq) Ayoub Younes (2023-)

== Honours ==
- Iraqi Premier Division League (second tier)
  - Winners (1): 1988–89
