= 1988–89 Iraq FA Cup =

Tournament details
- Country: Iraq
- Teams: 57

Final positions
- Champions: Al-Zawraa (5th title)
- Runners-up: Al-Tayaran

The 1988–89 Iraq FA Cup was the 12th edition of the Iraq FA Cup as a club competition. The tournament was won by Al-Zawraa for the fifth time, beating Al-Tayaran (now known as Al-Quwa Al-Jawiya) 3–0 in the final. The first two rounds were between teams from the lower divisions, before the top-flight clubs entered at the round of 32.

== Bracket ==
=== First preliminary round ===
Team 1	Agg.	Team 2	1st leg	2nd leg
Al-Amana	2–1	Al-Kadhimiya	1–0	1–1
Al-Mouqeen	3–1	Al-Falastini	1–1	2–0
Al-Khalis	4–2	Al-Karama	0–1	4–1
Al-Fotuwa	7–2	Qaraqosh	3–1	4–1
Samarra	5–0	Al-Dawr	4–0	1–0
Al-Taff	2–1	Al-Hindiya	0–1	2–0
Al-Tadamon	4–1	Al-Kufa	2–0	2–1
Al-Salam	9–1	Al-Hilla	4–1	5–0
Al-Ittihad	3–0	Al-Zubair	2–0	1–0
Al-Umal	2–0	Al-Armeni	0–0	2–0
Brayati	1–0	Al-Watan	0–0	1–0
Al-Hurriya	1–0	Al-Rafidain	0–0	1–0
Al-Kut	8–0	Al-Furat	2–0	6–0
Al-Junoob	bye			
Al-Athori	bye			
Al-Thawra	bye			

=== Second preliminary round ===
Team 1	Agg.	Team 2	1st leg	2nd leg
Al-Amana	4–1	Al-Mouqeen	3–1	1–0
Al-Khalis	1–4	Al-Taff	1–3	0–1
Al-Fotuwa	1–2	Brayati	1–0	0–2
Samarra	8–2	Al-Thawra	5–1	3–1
Al-Tadamon	1–7	Al-Salam	0–0	1–7
Al-Ittihad	6–1	Al-Hurriya	3–1	3–0
Al-Umal	6–3	Al-Athori	3–2	3–1
Al-Kut	5–2	Al-Junoob	0–1	5–1

=== Final phase ===
First round
Al-Tayaran	0	4	4
Al-Nasr	0	2	2
Al-Bahri	2	4	6
Al-Nasiriya	0	2	2
Duhok	1	4	5
Samarra	2	0	2
Al-Salam	?	0	L
Al-Naft	?	3	W
Al-Sulaikh	?	1	W
Al-Taff	?	1	L
Al-Amara	0	0	0
Al-Kut	2	2	4
Al-Tijara	0	2	2
Erbil	1	4	5
Al-Shorta	1	1	2
Al-Najaf	0	1	1
Al-Mosul	?	0	L
Salahaddin	?	1	W
Al-Zawraa	3	1	4
Al-Diwaniya	1	0	1
Al-Umal	3	1	4
Sulaymaniya	1	1	2
Al-Amana	1	0	1
Al-Minaa	2	2	4
Al-Talaba	5	0	5
Al-Jamahir	0	0	0
Diyala	?	0	L
Brayati	?	2	W
Al-Shabab	0	4	4
Babil	0	0	0
Al-Sinaa	0	3	3
Wahid Huzairan	0	1	1
Al-Jaish	1	6	7
Al-Numaniya	1	1	2
Al-Samawa	1	3	4
Al-Ittihad	2	4	6

Second round 2–5 May 1989
Al-Tayaran	3	3	6
Al-Bahri	1	1	2
Al-Rasheed	8	2	10
Al-Kut	2	0	2
Al-Zawraa	4	1	5
Al-Umal	1	0	1

Round of 16; 12–16 May 1989
Al-Tayaran (w/o)	3	3	6
Duhok	0	0	0
Al-Naft	2	0	2
Al-Sulaikh	0	1	1
Al-Rasheed	2	2	4
Erbil	0	1	1
Al-Shorta	1	6	7
Salahaddin	1	0	1
Al-Zawraa	3	1	4
Al-Minaa	1	1	2
Al-Talaba	5	3	8
Brayati	0	1	1
Al-Shabab	3	1	4
Al-Sinaa	1	1	2
Al-Jaish	4	4	8
Al-Ittihad	0	1	1

Quarter-finals; 21–25 May 1989
Al-Tayaran	2	3	5
Al-Naft	2	1	3
Al-Rasheed	2	1	3
Al-Shorta	1	0	1
Al-Zawraa (p)	0	1	1 (3)
Al-Talaba	1	0	1 (0)
Al-Jaish	1	1	2
Al-Shabab	0	4	4

Semi-finals; 29 May–2 June 1989
Al-Tayaran	2	3	5
Al-Rasheed	2	2	4
Al-Zawraa	2	1	3
Al-Shabab	0	1	1

Final; 9 June 1989
Al-Zawraa	3
Al-Tayaran	0

== Matches ==
=== Final ===
9 June 1989

Al-Zawraa	3–0	Al-Tayaran
Mahdi; Abid Nader; Saddam

Al-Shaab Stadium, Baghdad

Iraq FA Cup
1988–89 winner
Al-Zawraa
5th title
