= 1984–85 Iraq FA Cup =

Tournament details
- Country: Iraq

Final positions
- Champions: N/A (tournament cancelled)

The 1984–85 Iraq FA Cup was the ninth edition of the Iraq FA Cup as a club competition. The tournament was cancelled at the semi-final stage with Al-Rasheed, Al-Sinaa, Al-Shabab and Al-Tayaran being the four teams still remaining in the competition. Al-Tayaran had eliminated Al-Talaba in a Baghdad Derby in the quarter-finals, winning 4–3 on penalties after a 0–0 draw.

The competition was cancelled along with the 1984–85 Iraqi National League due to the national team's World Cup qualifying campaign.

== Bracket ==
First round
Al-Rasheed	3
Al-Naft	0
Al-Zawraa	2
Babil	0
Al-Mosul	W
Al-Samawa	L
Diyala	W
Al-Hurriya	L
Erbil	1
Al-Shabab	4
Al-Numaniya (p)	? (W)
Al-Najaf	? (L)
Al-Shorta (p)	2 (5)
Al-Jaish	2 (3)
Al-Amana	W
Salahaddin	L
Al-Sinaa	3
Al-Fotuwa	0
Al-Tijara	L
Al-Yaqdha	W
Al-Minaa	W
Al-Thawra	L
Al-Tayaran	2
Duhok	0
Samarra	W
Al-Sulaikh	L
Al-Talaba	W
Al-Jazair	L

Second round
Al-Rasheed	2
Al-Zawraa	1
Al-Mosul	W
Sulaymaniya	L
Al-Shorta	2
Al-Amana	1
Al-Sinaa	5
Al-Taff	0
Al-Tayaran	W
Al-Bahri	L
Samarra	L
Al-Talaba	W

Third round
Al-Mosul	W
Diyala	L
Al-Shabab	2
Al-Numaniya	0
Al-Sinaa	1
Al-Yaqdha	0

Quarter-finals
Al-Rasheed	2
Al-Mosul	0
Al-Shabab	1
Al-Shorta	0
Al-Sinaa	1
Al-Minaa	0
Al-Tayaran (p)	0 (4)
Al-Talaba	0 (3)

Semi-finals
Al-Rasheed
Al-Shabab
Al-Sinaa
Al-Tayaran

Final
