= 1977–78 Iraq FA Cup =

Tournament details
- Country: Iraq
- Dates: 9 September 1977 – 7 April 1978
- Teams: 32

Final positions
- Champions: Al-Tayaran (1st title)
- Runners-up: Al-Shorta

The 1977–78 Iraq FA Cup was the second edition of the Iraq FA Cup as a club competition. The tournament was won by Al-Tayaran (now known as Al-Quwa Al-Jawiya), beating Al-Shorta 5–3 on penalties in the final after a 1–1 draw for their first cup title.

== Bracket ==
Round of 32; 9 September 1977
Al-Zawraa	5
Diyala	2
Al-Jaish	0
Al-Tayaran B	1
Al-Shabab	L
Al-Bahri	W
Babil	W
Al-Rafidain	L
Al-Mosul	0
Al-Tayaran	2
Al-Ittihad	W
Al-Kufa	L
Al-Minaa	W
Al-Umal	L
Al-Amana	W
Al-Najaf	L
Al-Thawra	3
Al-Zawraa B	0
Al-Amana B	W
Salahaddin	L
Al-Shorta	W
Erbil	L
Al-Hurriya	3
Al-Hilla	1
Al-Iktisad	W
Al-Falluja	L
Al-Jazair	W
Al-Sinaa	L
Al-Thagher	L
Al-Jamiea	W
Al-Samawa	W
Al-Diwaniya	L

Round of 16; 16–17 September 1977
Al-Zawraa	3
Al-Tayaran B	0
Babil	0
Al-Bahri (w/o)	3
Al-Tayaran	1
Al-Ittihad	0
Al-Amana (w/o) (Note: The Al-Amana–Al-Minaa match was awarded as a 3–0 win to Al-Amana after the game had originally ended in a 2–0 win for Al-Minaa.)	3
Al-Minaa	0
Al-Thawra (w/o)	3
Al-Amana B	0
Al-Shorta	3
Al-Hurriya	1
Al-Iktisad (w/o)	3
Al-Jazair	0
Al-Jamiea	4
Al-Samawa	2

Quarter-finals; 24 November 1977
Al-Bahri	2
Al-Zawraa	1
Al-Amana	1
Al-Tayaran	2
Al-Thawra	2
Al-Shorta	3
Al-Iktisad (p)	0 (6)
Al-Jamiea	0 (5)

Semi-finals; 3 April 1978
Al-Bahri	0
Al-Tayaran (w/o)	3
Al-Shorta	1
Al-Iktisad	0

Final; 7 April 1978
Al-Tayaran (p)	1 (5)
Al-Shorta	1 (3)

== Matches ==
=== Final ===
7 April 1978

Al-Tayaran	1–1 (a.e.t.)	Al-Shorta
Fadhil 20'		Luaibi 10'
Penalties
Toma (penalty scored); Malakh (penalty scored); Qasim (penalty scored); Thijeel (penalty scored); Shaker (penalty scored)	5–3	(penalty scored) Aziz; (penalty scored) Dawood; (penalty scored) Luaibi; (penalty missed) Nouri

Al-Shaab Stadium, Baghdad

Iraq FA Cup
1977–78 winner
Al-Tayaran
1st title
