= 1975–76 Iraq FA Cup =

Tournament details
- Country: Iraq
- Dates: 1 September 1975 – 10 February 1976
- Teams: 28

Final positions
- Champions: Al-Zawraa (1st title)
- Runners-up: Al-Baladiyat

The 1975–76 Iraq FA Cup was the first edition of the Iraq FA Cup as a club competition, after the inaugural edition in the 1948–49 season included both clubs and institute-representative teams. The tournament was won by Al-Zawraa, beating Al-Baladiyat 5–0 in the final. Al-Zawraa also won the 1975–76 Iraqi National League to complete the first national double in Iraqi football.

== Bracket ==
Round of 32; 1–5 September 1975
Al-Zawraa	4
Al-Tayaran	2
Al-Samawa	1
Al-Iktisad	0
Al-Jamiea	1
Al-Jaish	0
Al-Shorta (p)	1 (4)
Al-Hilla	1 (2)
Al-Thawra	6
Al-Taji	2
Babil	W
Al-Khalidiya	L
Diyala	W
Al-Khalis	L
Al-Ittihad	1
Al-Umal	0
Al-Kut	1
Al-Rafidain	0
Al-Kufa	1
Al-Thagher	0
Al-Baladiyat	3
Al-Minaa	1
Al-Sinaa	2
Al-Jazair	0
Al-Fotuwa	1
Al-Hurriya	0
Al-Najaf	1
Al-Shabab	0

Round of 16
Al-Zawraa	4
Al-Samawa	1
Al-Jamiea	3
Al-Shorta	0
Al-Thawra	1
Babil	0
Al-Ittihad	2
Al-Kut	1
Al-Baladiyat	1
Al-Sinaa	0
Al-Fotuwa	2
Al-Najaf	1

Quarter-finals
Al-Zawraa	6
Al-Jamiea	0
Al-Thawra	3
Diyala	1
Al-Ittihad	4
Al-Kufa	0
Al-Baladiyat	3
Al-Fotuwa	2

Semi-finals; 27 January 1976
Al-Zawraa (w/o)	3
Al-Thawra	0
Al-Baladiyat	3
Al-Ittihad	1

Final; 10 February 1976
Al-Zawraa	5
Al-Baladiyat	0

== Matches ==
=== Final ===
10 February 1976

Al-Zawraa	5–0	Al-Baladiyat
Yousef; Ali; Kadhim

Al-Shaab Stadium, Baghdad
Referee: Subhi Adeeb

Iraq FA Cup
1975–76 winner
Al-Zawraa
1st title
