= 1974–75 Iraqi National Second Division =

Iraqi National Second Division
- Season: 1974–75
- Dates: 31 October 1974 – January 1975
- Champions: Al-Zawraa (1st title)
- Promoted: Al-Zawraa; Al-Jamiea; Al-Iktisad; Al-Hilla; Diyala
- Relegated: Al-Diwaniya; Al-Mosul; Al-Warkaa; Sulaymaniya
- Matches: 153

The 1974–75 Iraqi National Clubs Second Division League was the first season of what is now called the Iraqi Premier Division League, the second tier of the Iraqi football league system, since its establishment in 1974. 18 teams participated in the tournament. The league started on October 31, 1974. Al-Zawraa won the league championship and was promoted to the National Clubs First Division League (now called the Stars League), along with the four teams that finished the tournament in the first five positions in the standings, namely; Al-Jamiea, Al-Iktisad, Al-Hilla and Diyala. The four teams that finished in the bottom positions in the standings table were relegated to the National Clubs Third Division League, which are Al-Diwaniya, Al-Mosul, Al-Warkaa and Sulaymaniya.

== Competition format ==
18 teams are selected to play from one stage only, the winner of the match gets 2 points, and in the draw gets 1 point. The first five teams at the top of the standings are promoted to the Premier League, and the four teams at the bottom of the standings are relegated.

== Teams ==
18 teams represent 3 of them Baghdad, while the 15 teams represent the other provinces of Iraq.

=== Number of teams by Iraqi provinces ===
provinces	Teams	Name of Teams
Baghdad	3	Al-Jamiea, Al-Iktisad and Al-Zawraa
Karbalaa	2	Al-Ghari and Al-Kufa
Nineveh	1	Al-Mosul
Kirkuk	1	Al-Thawra
Diyala	1	Diyala
Erbil	1	Al-Taakhi
Sulaymaniyah	1	Sulaymaniya
Babil	1	Al-Hilla
Al-Anbar	1	Al-Khalidiya
Wasit	1	Al-Kut
Muthana	1	Al-Warkaa
Dhi Qar	1	Al-Jazair
Maysan	1	Al-Amara
Basra	1	Al-Ittihad
Al-Qādisiyyah	1	Al-Diwaniya

== League table ==
Team	Result
Al-Zawraa (C)	Promotion to the National Clubs First Division League
Diyala	Promotion to the National Clubs First Division League
Al-Iktisad	Promotion to the National Clubs First Division League
Al-Hilla	Promotion to the National Clubs First Division League
Al-Jamiea	Promotion to the National Clubs First Division League
Al-Ittihad
Al-Thawra
Al-Amara
Al-Ghari
Al-Jazair
Al-Kufa
Al-Kut
Al-Taakhi
Al-Khalidiya
Al-Diwaniya	Relegation to National Clubs Third Division League
Al-Warkaa	Relegation to National Clubs Third Division League
Sulaymaniya	Relegation to National Clubs Third Division League
Al-Mosul	Relegation to National Clubs Third Division League
