= 1991–92 Iraq FA Cup =

Tournament details
- Country: Iraq
- Dates: 15–30 September 1991
- Teams: 42

Final positions
- Champions: Al-Quwa Al-Jawiya (2nd title)
- Runners-up: Al-Tayaran

The 1991–92 Iraq FA Cup was the 15th edition of the Iraq FA Cup as a club competition. The tournament was won by Al-Quwa Al-Jawiya for the second time in their history, beating Al-Tayaran (now known as Al-Khutoot Al-Jawiya) 2–1 in the final.

== Bracket ==
First round 15 September 1991
Al-Quwa Al-Jawiya	3
Wahid Huzairan	0
Al-Zawraa	5
Al-Karkh	1
Samarra	4
Erbil	3
Al-Amana	0
Salahaddin	1
Diyala	0
Al-Nasr	3
Al-Talaba	3
Al-Hudood	1
Al-Fotuwa	0
Brayati	1
Al-Tayaran	3
Al-Naft	0
Al-Sulaikh (p)	1 (5)
Al-Falastini	1 (3)
Al-Minaa	2
Al-Mosul	0

Round of 32; 18 September 1991
Al-Quwa Al-Jawiya (a.e.t.)	2
Al-Zawraa	1
Samarra	2
Salahaddin	0
Al-Najaf	9
Al-Suwaira	0
Al-Shorta	2
Al-Nasr	1
Sulaymaniya	3
Al-Thawra	0
Al-Tijara	2
Al-Kut	0
Al-Numaniya	1
Babil	0
Al-Rumaila	1
Al-Falluja	2
Al-Talaba	2
Brayati	0
Al-Tayaran	1
Al-Sulaikh	0
Al-Nasiriya (p)	0 (4)
Al-Minaa	0 (2)
Al-Sinaa	1
Al-Shaheed Adnan	0
Al-Diwaniya	1
Al-Yaqdha	0
Al-Shabab	2
Al-Salam	1
Saad	6
Al-Ittihad	3
Al-Umal	1
Al-Kufa	0

Round of 16; 21 September 1991
Al-Quwa Al-Jawiya (p)	0 (5)
Samarra	0 (4)
Al-Shorta	2
Al-Najaf	1
Al-Tijara	6
Sulaymaniya	0
Al-Falluja	1 (4)
Al-Numaniya (p)	1 (5)
Al-Tayaran (p)	2 (7)
Al-Talaba	2 (6)
Al-Sinaa	4
Al-Nasiriya	0
Al-Shabab	3
Al-Diwaniya	0
Al-Umal	1 (6)
Saad	1 (5)

Quarter-finals; 24 September 1991
Al-Quwa Al-Jawiya	3
Al-Shorta	1
Al-Tijara	3
Al-Numaniya	2
Al-Tayaran	1
Al-Sinaa	0
Al-Shabab	1
Al-Umal	0

Semi-finals; 27 September 1991
Al-Quwa Al-Jawiya	1
Al-Tijara	0
Al-Tayaran	2
Al-Shabab	1

Final; 30 September 1991
Al-Quwa Al-Jawiya	2
Al-Tayaran	1

== Matches ==
=== Final ===
30 September 1991

Al-Quwa Al-Jawiya	2–1	Al-Tayaran
Yassir; Makki		Hameed

Al-Shaab Stadium, Baghdad

Iraq FA Cup
1991–92 winner
Al-Quwa Al-Jawiya
2nd title
