= 1992–93 Iraq FA Cup =

Tournament details
- Country: Iraq
- Dates: 3 September 1992 – 28 April 1993
- Teams: 48

Final positions
- Champions: Al-Zawraa (8th title)
- Runners-up: Al-Talaba

Tournament statistics
- Top goal scorer(s): Ahmed Radhi (9 goals)

The 1992–93 Iraq FA Cup was the 16th edition of the Iraq FA Cup as a club competition. The tournament was won by Al-Zawraa for the eighth time in their history, beating Al-Talaba 2–1 in the final.

== Bracket ==
First round 3–4 September 1992
Al-Jaish (w/o)	3
Al-Bahri	0
Al-Quwa Al-Jawiya	1
Al-Sinaa	0
Al-Shorta	1
Al-Tijara	2
Al-Naft	1
Al-Shabab	0
Al-Zawraa	1
Diyala	0
Al-Diwaniya	3
Al-Ittihad	2
Al-Rumaila	0
Al-Ramadi	4
Al-Karkh	3
Al-Kufa	1
Al-Amana	1
Al-Khutoot	2
Al-Najaf	2
Al-Adhamiya	1
Al-Nasiriya	2
Sulaymaniya	1
Brayati	1
Al-Minaa	3
Al-Dawr Al-Ahli	6
Shabab Al-Dawr	0
Al-Falluja	0
Al-Yaqdha	2
Samarra	1
Al-Numaniya	0
Al-Thawra	0
Al-Suwaira	1

Round of 32; 7 September 1992
Al-Jaish	2
Al-Quwa Al-Jawiya	1
Al-Tijara	1
Al-Naft	0
Al-Zawraa (a.e.t.)	2
Al-Diwaniya	1
Al-Ramadi	0 (1)
Al-Karkh (p)	0 (4)
Kirkuk	1
Al-Sulaikh	0
Al-Umal	1
Al-Shaheed Adnan	0
Al-Mosul	5
Al-Musayyib	0
Al-Kut	0 (7)
Zakho (p)	0 (8)
Al-Khutoot	5
Al-Najaf	3
Al-Nasiriya	0
Al-Minaa	1
Al-Dawr Al-Ahli	3
Al-Yaqdha	0
Samarra	4
Al-Suwaira	0
Al-Talaba	3
Haifa	0
Salahaddin	3
Erbil	1
Al-Hudood	3
Al-Fotuwa	0
Al-Salam	2
Karbala	1

Round of 16; 11 September 1992
Al-Jaish	1
Al-Tijara	2
Al-Zawraa	2
Al-Karkh	1
Kirkuk	2
Al-Umal	1
Al-Mosul	6
Zakho	1
Al-Khutoot	1
Al-Minaa	0
Al-Dawr Al-Ahli	1
Samarra	3
Al-Talaba (p)	0 (7)
Salahaddin	0 (6)
Al-Hudood	0
Al-Salam	1

Quarter-finals; 17–18 September 1992
Al-Tijara	0
Al-Zawraa	6
Kirkuk	0
Al-Mosul	1
Al-Khutoot	2
Samarra	3
Al-Talaba	2
Al-Salam	0

Semi-finals; 26 September 1992
Al-Zawraa	5
Al-Mosul	1
Al-Talaba	3
Samarra	0

Final; 28 April 1993
Al-Zawraa	2
Al-Talaba	1

== Matches ==
=== Quarter-finals ===
17 September 1992

Al-Mosul	1–0	Kirkuk
Ali

17 September 1992

Samarra	3–2	Al-Khutoot

17 September 1992

Al-Talaba	2–0	Al-Salam
Zaidan; Hussein

Al-Kashafa Stadium, Baghdad

18 September 1992

Al-Zawraa	6–0	Al-Tijara
Radhi; Saddam; Abid Nader

Al-Kashafa Stadium, Baghdad

=== Semi-finals ===
26 September 1992

Al-Talaba	3–0	Samarra
Kareem; Kadhim

Al-Shaab Stadium, Baghdad
26 September 1992

Al-Zawraa	5–1	Al-Mosul
Radhi; Hussein; Hashim		Ali

Al-Shaab Stadium, Baghdad

=== Final ===
28 April 1993

Al-Zawraa	2–1	Al-Talaba
Mahdi 1', 24'		Hadi 86' (pen.)

Al-Shaab Stadium, Baghdad

Iraq FA Cup
1992–93 winner
Al-Zawraa
8th title
