= 1990–91 Iraq FA Cup =

Tournament details
- Country: Iraq
- Dates: 5 October 1990 – 28 April 1991
- Teams: 38

Final positions
- Champions: Al-Zawraa (7th title)
- Runners-up: Al-Jaish

Tournament statistics
- Top goal scorer: Karim Saddam

The 1990–91 Iraq FA Cup was the 14th edition of the Iraq FA Cup as a club competition. The tournament was won by Al-Zawraa for the third consecutive time and seventh time in total, beating Al-Jaish 4–3 on penalties in the final after a 1–1 draw.

== Bracket ==
First round 5–12 October 1990
Al-Tayaran (a.e.t.)	0	3
Al-Naft	1	0
Al-Mosul	4	8
Al-Ittihad	0	1
Al-Najaf	3	4
Al-Thawra	0	0
Al-Salam	1	1
Al-Kufa	1	0
Al-Yaqdha (p)	1	1 (5)
Babil	0	2 (4)
Al-Talaba	4	1
Brayati	0	1
Al-Sulaikh	3	3
Salahaddin	1	0
Al-Zawraa	4	2
Al-Rumaila	0	0
Al-Minaa	3	1
Sulaymaniya	1	0
Al-Jaish	2	6
Wahid Huzairan	0	1
Al-Amana	2	2
Al-Umal	0	3
Al-Tijara	1	0
Al-Diwaniya	0	0
Al-Bahri	3	1
Al-Fotuwa	0	0
Al-Shorta	4	1
Al-Shabab	0	0
Al-Sinaa	0	0 (4)
Samarra (p)	0	0 (5)
Al-Nasiriya	3	1
Saad	0	1
Al-Nasr	1	0
Al-Falastini	0	0
Al-Karkh	1	3
Al-Numaniya	0	0

Second round
Al-Najaf	1	4
Al-Salam	0	1
Erbil	1	1
Al-Yaqdha	1	2
Al-Shorta	4	0
Samarra	2	0
Al-Kut (p)	0	0 (4)
Al-Nasiriya	0	0 (2)

Round of 16; 18–26 October 1990
Al-Tayaran	1	7
Al-Mosul	3	1
Al-Najaf	2	1
Al-Yaqdha	1	1
Al-Talaba	0	1
Al-Sulaikh	1	1
Al-Zawraa	4	1
Al-Minaa	0	0
Al-Jaish	0	2
Al-Amana	1	0
Al-Tijara	1	3
Al-Bahri	0	0
Al-Shorta	4	2
Al-Kut	0	0
Al-Nasr	1	0
Al-Karkh	0	3

Quarter-finals; 22–23 April 1991
Al-Tayaran	2
Al-Najaf	1
Al-Zawraa	3
Al-Sulaikh	0
Al-Jaish	1
Al-Tijara	0
Al-Karkh (p)	2 (4)
Al-Shorta	2 (3)

Semi-finals; 25–26 April 1991
Al-Zawraa (a.e.t.)	2
Al-Tayaran	1
Final; 28 April 1991
Al-Zawraa (p)	1 (4)
Al-Jaish	1 (3)
Al-Jaish (p)	1 (3)
Al-Karkh	1 (2)

== Matches ==
=== Final ===
28 April 1991

Al-Zawraa	1–1 (a.e.t.)	Al-Jaish
Radhi		Emmanuel
Penalties
	4–3

Al-Shaab Stadium, Baghdad

Iraq FA Cup
1990–91 winner
Al-Zawraa
7th title
