= Salam Hashim =

Iraqi footballer and coach

Personal information
- Full name: Salam Hashim Mghamis
- Date of birth: 7 October 1966 (age 60)
- Place of birth: Baghdad, Iraq
- Position: Defender

Team information
- Current team: Al-Sikak SC President

Youth career
- 1975–1983: Al-Zawraa

Senior career*
| Years | Team | Apps | (Gls) |
| 1983−1985 | Al-Zawraa | | |
| 1985–1990 | Al-Rasheed | | |
| 1990–1997 | Al-Zawraa | | |

International career
| 1984−1985 | Iraq U20 | | |
| 1988 | Iraq U23 | | |
| 1986−1992 | Iraq | | |

Managerial career
- 1999: Al-Kadhimiya
- 2000–2001: Al-Arabi
- 2002–2003: Al-Difaa Al-Jawi
- 2003: Al-Zawraa
- 2005: Al-Naft
- * Club domestic league appearances and goals

Salam Hashim (Arabic: سلام هاشم) (born 1966) is an Iraqi football coach and former player. He played as a defender. He competed in the men's tournament at the 1988 Summer Olympics.

== Appearances in films ==
Hashim makes a cameo appearance with Falah Hassan, Laith Hussein and Karim Saddam, in the 1993 Iraqi film: 100%.

== Honours ==
=== Club ===
Al-Rasheed

- Asian Club Championship Runners-up: 1988–89
- Arab Club Champions Cup winners (3): 1985, 1986, 1987
- Iraqi Premier League: winners (3): 1986–87, 1987–88, 1988–89
- Iraq FA Cup winners (2): 1986–87, 1987–88

Al-Zawraa

- Iraqi Premier League winners (4): 1990–91, 1993–94, 1994–95, 1995–96
- Iraq FA Cup winners (5): 1990–91, 1992–93, 1993–94, 1994–95, 1995–96
- Baghdad Championship: 1991–92

=== International ===
- Arab Nations Cup: 1988
- Peace and Friendship Cup: 1989

=== Individual ===
- Most player to win titles in the Iraqi Premier League: 7 times (joint record)
