= 1987–88 Iraq FA Cup =

Tournament details
- Country: Iraq

Final positions
- Champions: Al-Rasheed (2nd title)
- Runners-up: Al-Zawraa

The 1987–88 Iraq FA Cup was the 11th edition of the Iraq FA Cup as a club competition. The tournament was won by Al-Rasheed for the second consecutive time, beating Al-Zawraa 4–3 on penalties in the final after a 0–0 draw on 28 September 1987. Al-Rasheed won the 1987–88 Iraqi National League as well to complete their second double in a row. It was also Al-Zawraa's first FA Cup final defeat.

== Bracket ==
Round of 32; First legs: 1–2 September 1987; Second legs: 4–5 September 1987
Al-Rasheed	4	2	6
Samarra	0	0	0
Al-Naft	3	1	4
Al-Nasr	1	2	3
Al-Sinaa (p)	1	1	2 (W)
Al-Najaf	1	1	2 (L)
Al-Tijara (p)	?	?	? (W)
Salahaddin	?	?	? (L)
Al-Jazair	0	0	0
Al-Talaba	5	4	9
Al-Amana	2	0	1
Sulaymaniya	0	1	1
Al-Tayaran	7	1	8
Diyala	0	0	0
Al-Bahri	5	3	8
Al-Musayyib	0	1	1
Al-Zawraa	2	4	6
Al-Siyaha	0	1	1
Al-Diwaniya	?	?	W
Al-Samawa	?	?	L
Al-Shabab	4	1	5
Al-Umal	0	2	2
Al-Mosul	?	?	W
Brayati	?	?	L
Al-Sulaikh	1	1	2
Al-Jaish	4	3	7
Babil	?	?	W
Al-Jamahir	?	?	L
Al-Shorta (p)	?	?	? (W)
Al-Minaa	?	?	? (L)
Erbil	?	?	W
Al-Falastini	?	?	L

Round of 16; First legs: 8 September 1987; Second legs: 12 September 1987
Al-Rasheed	3	1	4
Al-Naft	0	1	1
Al-Sinaa	1	0	1 (5)
Al-Tijara (p)	0	1	1 (6)
Al-Talaba	0	2	2
Al-Amana	0	1	1
Al-Tayaran	0	1	1
Al-Bahri	0	3	3
Al-Zawraa	6	2	8
Al-Diwaniya	0	1	1
Al-Shabab	2	4	6
Al-Mosul	1	1	2
Al-Jaish	7	14	21
Babil	1	0	1
Al-Shorta	2	0	2
Erbil	0	0	0

Quarter-finals; First legs: 15 September 1987; Second legs: 19 September 1987
Al-Rasheed	3	5	8
Al-Tijara	1	1	2
Al-Talaba (p)	1	0	1 (4)
Al-Bahri	0	1	1 (2)
Al-Zawraa	1	1	2
Al-Shabab	0	1	1
Al-Jaish	4	4	8
Al-Shorta	0	1	1

Semi-finals; First legs: September 1987; Second legs: 26 September 1987
Al-Rasheed	2	2	4
Al-Talaba	1	0	1
Al-Zawraa	1	2	3
Al-Jaish	1	0	1

Final; 28 September 1987
Al-Rasheed (p)	0 (4)
Al-Zawraa	0 (3)

== Matches ==
=== Final ===
28 September 1987

Al-Rasheed	0–0 (a.e.t.)	Al-Zawraa
Penalties
	4–3

Iraq FA Cup
1987–88 winner
Al-Rasheed
2nd title
