= 1997–98 Iraq FA Cup =

Tournament details
- Country: Iraq

Final positions
- Champions: Al-Zawraa (12th title)
- Runners-up: Al-Quwa Al-Jawiya

The 1997–98 Iraq FA Cup was the 21st edition of the Iraq FA Cup as a club competition. The tournament was won by Al-Zawraa for the 12th time in their history, beating Al-Quwa Al-Jawiya 4–3 on penalties in the final after a 1–1 draw.

== Bracket ==
Round of 32; First legs: 1 November 1997
Al-Tijara	1	1	2
Al-Najaf	0	3	3
Al-Umal	1	?	L
Duhok	2	?	W
Al-Nahdha	0	?	L
Al-Qasim	1	?	W
Al-Zawraa	5	1	6
Al-Karkh	0	0	0
Al-Shorta	3	?	W
Al-Kadhimiya	1	?	L
Al-Sinaa	0	?	L
Al-Sulaikh	1	?	W
Al-Khawarnaq	0	?	L
Al-Nasiriya	1	?	W
Al-Talaba	2	?	W
Al-Hilla	0	?	L
Al-Naft	0	?	L
Maysan	1	?	W
Samarra	3	?	W
Al-Majer Al-Kabir	0	?	L
Salahaddin	4	?	W
Al-Khutoot	2	?	L
Al-Bahri	0	0	0
Al-Jaish	2	3	5
Al-Minaa	4	2	6
Al-Mosul	1	1	2
Erbil	2	0	2
Diyala	0	1	1
Al-Quwa Al-Jawiya	5	?	W
Al-Amana	1	?	L

Round of 16; First legs: 24 November 1997; Second legs: 1 December 1997
Al-Najaf	1	0	1
Duhok	0	2	2
Al-Qasim	0	0	0
Al-Zawraa	6	11	17
Al-Shorta	1	3	4
Al-Sulaikh	0	0	0
Al-Nasiriya	1	0	1
Al-Talaba	2	6	8
Al-Kut	3	1	4
Maysan (a)	3	1	4
Samarra	1	1	2
Salahaddin	0	3	3
Al-Jaish	2	1	3
Al-Minaa	0	0	0
Erbil	1	0	1
Al-Quwa Al-Jawiya	2	5	7

Quarter-finals; First legs: 29 December 1997; Second legs: 12 January 1998
Duhok	1	0	1
Al-Zawraa	2	3	5
Al-Shorta	3	3	6
Al-Talaba	0	2	2
Maysan	0	0	0
Salahaddin	0	1	1
Al-Jaish	1	1	2
Al-Quwa Al-Jawiya (a)	2	0	2

Semi-finals; First legs: 30 March 1998; Second legs: 13 April 1998
Al-Zawraa	1	2	3
Al-Shorta	0	1	1
Salahaddin	0	1	1
Al-Quwa Al-Jawiya	1	2	3

Final; 28 April 1998
Al-Zawraa (p)	1 (4)
Al-Quwa Al-Jawiya	1 (3)

== Matches ==
=== Quarter-finals ===
29 December 1997

Al-Shorta	3–0	Al-Talaba
Abdul-Sattar 37'; Assem 52'; Majeed 77'

Al-Shaab Stadium, Baghdad
12 January 1998

Al-Talaba	2–3	Al-Shorta
Goal		Majeed (pen.)

Al-Shaab Stadium, Baghdad

Al-Shorta won 6–2 on aggregate.

29 December 1997

Duhok	1–2	Al-Zawraa
Goal		Abbas; Saddam (pen.)

Duhok Stadium, Duhok
12 January 1998

Al-Zawraa	3–0	Duhok
Karim; Mahdi

Al-Shorta Stadium, Baghdad

Al-Zawraa won 5–1 on aggregate.

29 December 1997

Al-Quwa Al-Jawiya	2–1	Al-Jaish

Al-Shorta Stadium, Baghdad
12 January 1998

Al-Jaish	0–1	Al-Quwa Al-Jawiya

Al-Sinaa Stadium, Baghdad

Al-Quwa Al-Jawiya won 3–1 on aggregate.

29 December 1997

Maysan	0–0	Salahaddin

Maysan Stadium, Amara
12 January 1998

Salahaddin	1–0	Maysan

Tikrit Stadium, Tikrit

Salahaddin won 1–0 on aggregate.

=== Semi-finals ===
30 March 1998

Al-Shorta	0–1	Al-Zawraa
		Hamad

Al-Shaab Stadium, Baghdad
13 April 1998

Al-Zawraa	2–1	Al-Shorta
Abbas (pen.); Abdul-Jabar		Goal

Al-Shaab Stadium, Baghdad

Al-Zawraa won 3–1 on aggregate.

30 March 1998

Salahaddin	0–1	Al-Quwa Al-Jawiya

Tikrit Stadium, Tikrit
13 April 1998

Al-Quwa Al-Jawiya	2–1	Salahaddin

Al-Sinaa Stadium, Baghdad

Al-Quwa Al-Jawiya won 3–1 on aggregate.

=== Final ===
28 April 1998

Al-Zawraa	1–1 (a.e.t.)	Al-Quwa Al-Jawiya
Hamad 90+7' (pen.)		Farhan
Penalties
Hamad (penalty missed); Abdul-Latif (penalty scored); Mohammad (penalty scored); Abbas (penalty scored); Fawzi (penalty scored)	4–3	(penalty scored) Dhahid; (penalty scored) Jassim; (penalty scored) Zughayir; (penalty missed) Swadi; (penalty missed) Abdul-Hameed

Al-Shaab Stadium, Baghdad
Referee: Abdul-Aal Khudhair

Iraq FA Cup
1997–98 winner
Al-Zawraa
12th title
