= 1986–87 Iraq FA Cup =

Tournament details
- Country: Iraq

Final positions
- Champions: Al-Rasheed (1st title)
- Runners-up: Al-Jaish

The 1986–87 Iraq FA Cup was the tenth edition of the Iraq FA Cup as a club competition. The tournament was won by Al-Rasheed for the first time, beating Al-Jaish 4–3 on penalties in the final after a 1–1 draw. Al-Rasheed also won the 1986–87 Iraqi National League to complete the double.

== Bracket ==
Round of 32
Al-Rasheed | 2
Al-Sulaikh | 0
Al-Naft | 3
Al-Diwaniya | 1
Al-Zawraa | 8
Diyala | 0
Al-Samawa (p) | ? (4)
Al-Amana | ? (3)
Al-Shabab | 1
Al-Najaf | 0
Al-Bahri | 3
Sulaymaniya | 1
Al-Mosul (p) | ? (4)
Al-Talaba | ? (2)
Al-Jaish | 2
Al-Tijara | 0
Salahaddin | 1
Al-Nasr | 0
Samarra | W
Al-Siyaha | L
Al-Tayaran | 2
Al-Minaa | 1
Al-Sinaa (p) | ? (W)
Al-Shorta | ? (L)
Al-Umal | 1
Erbil | 0
Wahid Huzairan | 3
Babil | 0

Round of 16
Al-Rasheed | 2
Al-Naft | 1
Al-Zawraa | 2
Al-Samawa | 0
Al-Bahri | 4
Al-Mosul | 1
Salahaddin | 3
Samarra | 0
Al-Tayaran | 1
Al-Sinaa | 0
Al-Umal | 3
Wahid Huzairan | 1

Quarter-finals
Al-Rasheed | 4
Al-Zawraa | 0
Al-Shabab | 2
Al-Bahri | 1
Al-Jaish (p) | 1 (4)
Salahaddin | 1 (2)
Al-Tayaran | 3
Al-Umal | 0

Semi-finals
Al-Rasheed (replay) | 1(2)
Al-Shabab | 1(1)
Al-Jaish | 2
Al-Tayaran | 1

Final; 18 September 1986
Al-Rasheed (p) | 1 (4)
Al-Jaish | 1 (3)

== Matches ==
=== Final ===
18 September 1986

| Al-Rasheed | 1–1 (a.e.t.) | Al-Jaish |
|---|---|---|
| Aoda 38' | | Ghanim 10' |
Penalties
| | 4–3 |

Al-Rasheed Stadium, Baghdad
Referee: Farooq Tawfiq

Iraq FA Cup
1986–87 winner
Al-Rasheed
1st title
