= 1980–81 Iraq FA Cup =

Football tournament season

Tournament details
- Country: Iraq
- Dates: 8 May – 15 June 1981
- Teams: 40

Final positions
- Champions: Al-Zawraa (3rd title)
- Runners-up: Al-Talaba

The 1980–81 Iraq FA Cup was the fifth edition of the Iraq FA Cup as a club competition. The tournament was won by Al-Zawraa for the third time, beating 1980–81 Iraqi National League champions Al-Talaba 1–0 in the final with a goal from Thamir Yousef. Al-Zawraa's previous results in the tournament included a 3–0 win over Al-Najaf a 1–0 win over Al-Shabab and a 2–0 win over Al-Amana. Al-Talaba's previous results were a 6–5 penalty shootout win over Al-Shorta, a 2–0 win over Al-Ittihad and a 1–0 win over Al-Minaa.

== Bracket ==
First round
Al-Najaf	0
Al-Zawraa	3
Al-Amara	L
Al-Shabab	W
Al-Amana	W
Al-Kufa	L
Al-Thawra	L
Al-Sinaa	W
Al-Talaba (p)	0 (6)
Al-Shorta	0 (5)
Al-Hudood	L
Al-Ittihad	W
Al-Minaa	W
Salahaddin	L
Al-Tayaran	W
Al-Tijara	L
Samarra	L
Al-Adhamiya	W

Second round
Al-Jaish	5
Al-Sinaa	3
Al-Tayaran	W
Al-Adhamiya	L

Quarter-finals
Al-Zawraa	1
Al-Shabab	0
Al-Amana	2
Al-Jaish	0
Al-Talaba	2
Al-Ittihad	0
Al-Minaa	W
Al-Tayaran	L

Semi-finals
Al-Zawraa	2
Al-Amana	0
Al-Talaba	1
Al-Minaa	0

Final; 15 June 1981
Al-Zawraa	1
Al-Talaba	0

== Matches ==
=== Final ===
15 June 1981

Al-Zawraa	1–0	Al-Talaba
Yousef

Al-Shaab Stadium, Baghdad

Iraq FA Cup
1980–81 winner
Al-Zawraa
3rd title
