= Haidar Mahmoud =

Iraqi football player and coach

Personal information
- Full name: Haidar Mahmoud Majid
- Date of birth: 19 September 1973 (age 53)
- Place of birth: Baghdad, Iraq
- Position: Right-back

Senior career*
Years	Team	Apps	(Gls)
1989–1991	Al-Tijara		
1991–1992	Al-Khutoot		
1992–1995	Al-Naft		
1995–2000	Al-Zawraa		
2000	Al-Shorta		
2000–2002	Al-Zawraa		
2002	Shabab Sahel		
2002–2004	Al-Shamal		
2004–2006	Al-Zawraa		

International career
1996–2004	Iraq	54	(7)

Managerial career
- 2009–2010: Al-Zawraa
- 2015: Zakho
- 2017: Sulaymaniyah
- 2017–2018: Karbalaa
- * Club domestic league appearances and goals

Haidar Mahmoud Majid (Arabic: حَيْدَر مَحْمُود مَجِيد; born 19 September 1973) is an Iraqi football coach and former player. As a player, Mahmoud played as a right-back, representing Iraq in the 1996 and 2000 AFC Asian Cup. He also played club football with Al Zawraa for 10 years.

== International career ==
Mahmoud scored two goals in a 4–1 win over Thailand in the 1996 Asian Cup, and scored one in the 2000 Asian Cup in Lebanon in a 2–0 win, also over Thailand.

== Managerial career ==
Mahmoud took charge of Iraqi Premier League club Al-Zawraa in 2009, until 28 August 2010, when his contract was terminated. Initially assistant coach of Zakho, he was then appointed head coach of the club, until the expiration of his contract on 22 September 2015. Mahmoud was head coach of Al-Sulaymaniyah for less than two weeks, between 28 October and 8 November 2017, before being appointed head coach of Karbalaa on 8 December 2017. He remained in charge until the termination of his contract on 25 April 2018.

== Career statistics ==
=== International ===
Scores and results list Iraq's goal tally first, score column indicates score after each Mahmoud goal.

List of international goals scored by Haidar Mahmoud
No.	Date	Venue	Opponent	Score	Result	Competition	Ref.
1	11 December 1996	Al Maktoum Stadium, Dubai, United Arab Emirates	Thailand	1–0	4–1	1996 AFC Asian Cup	
2	11 December 1996	Al Maktoum Stadium, Dubai, United Arab Emirates	Thailand	3–1	4–1	1996 AFC Asian Cup	
3	31 August 1999	Amman International Stadium, Amman, Jordan	Jordan	3–4	4–4	1999 Pan Arab Games	
4	12 October 2000	Saida Municipal Stadium, Sidon, Lebanon	Thailand	2–0	2–0	2000 AFC Asian Cup	
5	25 April 2001	Almaty Central Stadium, Almaty, Kazakhstan	Kazakhstan	1–1	1–1	2002 FIFA World Cup qualification	
6	13 January 2002	Al Wakrah Stadium, Doha, Qatar	Qatar	2–1	3–1	Friendly	
7	7 September 2002	Abbasiyyin Stadium, Damascus, Syria	Jordan	3–2	3–2	2002 WAFF Championship	

== Honours ==
Al-Zawraa

- Iraqi Premier League: 1995–96, 1998–99, 1999–2000, 2000–01, 2005–06
- Iraq FA Cup: 1995–96, 1997–98, 1998–99, 1999–2000

Individual

- Lebanese Premier League top scorer: 2001–02
