= 1996–97 Iraq FA Cup =

Tournament details
- Country: Iraq
- Teams: 74

Final positions
- Champions: Al-Quwa Al-Jawiya (3rd title)
- Runners-up: Al-Shorta

Tournament statistics
- Top goal scorer(s): Mahmoud Majeed (8 goals)

The 1996–97 Iraq FA Cup was the 20th edition of the Iraq FA Cup as a club competition. The tournament was won by Al-Quwa Al-Jawiya for the third time in their history, beating Al-Shorta 7–6 on penalties in the final after a 1–1 draw. Al-Zawraa's Mahmoud Majeed was the tournament's top scorer with eight goals.

Al-Quwa Al-Jawiya also won the Iraqi Premier League, the Umm al-Ma'arik Championship and the Iraqi Perseverance Cup in the 1996–97 season to become the first Iraqi team to win the domestic quadruple.

== Bracket ==
Round of 32; 27 September 1996
Al-Sulaikh	0
Al-Najaf	1
Al-Karkh	6
Al-Rumaitha	0
Al-Quwa Al-Jawiya (a.g.g.e.t.)	2
Al-Difaa Al-Jawi	1
Al-Kadhimiya	0
Al-Mosul	1
Al-Talaba	4
Al-Hudood	0
Al-Zawraa	7
Kirkuk	0
Diyala	1 (8)
Al-Kut (p)	1 (9)
Al-Umal	0
Al-Nasiriya	3
Karbala	1
Al-Ramadi	2
Al-Salam (p)	? (5)
Al-Khalis	? (4)
Al-Naft	0
Al-Shorta	1
Al-Sinaa	0
Al-Jaish	1

Round of 16; First legs: 28 October 1996; Second legs: 4 November 1996
Al-Najaf	2	0	2
Al-Karkh	0	0	0
Al-Quwa Al-Jawiya	1	1	2
Al-Mosul	0	0	0
Al-Basra	0	?	L
Al-Talaba	4	?	W
Shabab Al-Anbar	0	0	0
Al-Zawraa	4	3	7
Samarra	0	?	L
Al-Kut	2	?	W
Al-Nasiriya	2	0	2
Al-Ramadi	1	2	3
Al-Salam	1	?	L
Al-Shorta	3	?	W
Al-Jaish	1	0	1
Salahaddin	1	1	2

Quarter-finals; First legs: 10 March 1997; Second legs: 17 March 1997
Al-Najaf	3	2	5
Al-Quwa Al-Jawiya (a) (Note: The first leg which was considered as a home game for Al-Najaf was moved to Baghdad as a punishment by the Iraq Football Association.)	3	2	5
Al-Talaba	0	2	2
Al-Zawraa (w/o) (Note: Al-Zawraa were awarded a 3–0 walkover victory in the first leg after the original score was 2–1 to Al-Talaba, due to Al-Talaba fielding the player Salam Omer who was ineligible due to suspension.)	3	0	3
Al-Kut	3	0	3
Al-Ramadi	1	0	1
Al-Shorta	4	1	5
Salahaddin	0	0	0

Semi-finals; First legs: 31 March 1997; Second legs: 7 April 1997
Al-Quwa Al-Jawiya (a)	0	1	1
Al-Zawraa	0	1	1
Al-Kut	1	0	1
Al-Shorta	1	1	2

Final; 28 April 1997
Al-Quwa Al-Jawiya (p)	1 (7)
Al-Shorta	1 (6)

== Matches ==
=== Semi-finals ===
31 March 1997

Al-Quwa Al-Jawiya	0–0	Al-Zawraa

Al-Quwa Al-Jawiya Stadium, Baghdad
7 April 1997

Al-Zawraa	1–1	Al-Quwa Al-Jawiya
Saddam (pen.)		Omran

Al-Zawraa Stadium, Baghdad

1–1 on aggregate. Al-Quwa Al-Jawiya won on away goals.

Al-Kut	1–1	Al-Shorta
Goal		Assem

Al-Kut Stadium, Kut

Al-Shorta	1–0	Al-Kut
Qais

Al-Shorta Stadium, Baghdad

Al-Shorta won 2–1 on aggregate.

=== Final ===
28 April 1997

Al-Quwa Al-Jawiya	1–1 (a.e.t.)	Al-Shorta
Emmanuel 31'		Jawad 51'
Penalties
Dhahid (penalty scored); Hadi (penalty scored); Jassim (penalty scored); Khalaf (penalty scored); Kadhim (penalty scored); Zughayir (penalty scored); Daham (penalty scored)	7–6	(penalty scored) Abid Ali; (penalty scored) Habib; (penalty scored) Hameed; (penalty scored) Assem; (penalty scored) Qais; (penalty scored) Adel; (penalty missed) Mohammed

Al-Shaab Stadium, Baghdad
Attendance: 50,000

Iraq FA Cup
1996–97 winner
Al-Quwa Al-Jawiya
3rd title
