= 1978–79 Iraq FA Cup =

Tournament details
- Country: Iraq
- Teams: 33

Final positions
- Champions: Al-Zawraa (2nd title)
- Runners-up: Al-Jaish

The 1978–79 Iraq FA Cup was the third edition of the Iraq FA Cup as a club competition. The tournament was won by Al-Zawraa, beating Al-Jaish 3–1 in the final on 3 May 1979 to secure their second cup, with goals from Hazem Jassam, Ibrahim Ali and Thamir Yousef. Al-Zawraa's previous matches in the tournament were a 7–0 win over Al-Hurriya, a 3–1 win over Al-Ittihad, a 4–0 win over Al-Shorta and a 6–0 win over Al-Shabab. Meanwhile, Al-Jaish had beaten Al-Tayaran 5–4 on penalties after a 0–0 draw in the semi-finals, after Al-Tayaran had earlier beaten Al-Minaa 2–0 in the quarter-finals. Al-Zawraa also won the 1978–79 Iraqi National League to complete the second double in Iraqi football.

Al-Talaba were disqualified from the tournament due to participating in an Arab University tournament without the approval of the Iraq Football Association.

== Bracket ==
From the quarter-finals onwards:

Quarter-finals; 17 September 1978 – 29 April 1979
Al-Zawraa	4
Al-Shorta	0
Al-Shabab	2
Al-Sinaa	1
Al-Jaish	2
Salahaddin	0
Al-Tayaran (replay)	1(2)
Al-Minaa	1(0)

Semi-finals; 1 May 1979
Al-Zawraa	6
Al-Shabab	0
Al-Jaish (p)	0 (5)
Al-Tayaran	0 (4)

Final; 3 May 1979
Al-Zawraa	3
Al-Jaish	1

== Matches ==
=== Final ===
3 May 1979

Al-Zawraa	3–1	Al-Jaish
Jassam; Ali; Yousef		Ibrahim

Al-Shaab Stadium, Baghdad

Iraq FA Cup
1978–79 winner
Al-Zawraa
2nd title
