= 1979–80 Iraq FA Cup =

Tournament details
- Country: Iraq
- Teams: 41

Final positions
- Champions: Al-Jaish (1st title)
- Runners-up: Al-Talaba

Tournament statistics
- Top goal scorer(s): Salim Malakh; Thamer Yousif (4 goals each)

The 1979–80 Iraq FA Cup was the fourth edition of the Iraq FA Cup as a club competition. The tournament was won by Al-Jaish for the first time, beating Al-Talaba 4–2 on penalties in the final after a 1–1 draw, with Al-Jaish goalkeeper Fatah Al-Ani saving penalties from Ali Hussein Shihab and Wamidh Khudhor in the shootout. The first two rounds were between teams from the lower division, before the top-flight clubs entered at the round of 32, where Al-Zawraa beat Al-Umal 4–0.

== Bracket ==
From the Round of 16 onwards:

Round of 16 ?–1 November 1979
Al-Shorta	W
Unknown	L
Al-Jaish	W
Unknown	L
Salahaddin	W
Unknown	L
Al-Tayaran	0
Al-Amana	1
Al-Zawraa	6
Al-Sinaa	0
Al-Minaa	W
Unknown	L
Al-Tijara	W
Unknown	L
Al-Talaba	W
Unknown	L

Quarter-finals; 2–5 November 1979
Al-Shorta	0
Al-Jaish	1
Salahaddin	0
Al-Amana	2
Al-Zawraa	1
Al-Minaa	0
Al-Tijara	0
Al-Talaba	3

Semi-finals; 6–7 November 1979
Al-Jaish	4
Al-Amana	2
Al-Talaba	1
Al-Zawraa	0

Final; 7 April 1980
Al-Jaish (p)	1 (4)
Al-Talaba	1 (2)

== Matches ==
=== Final ===
7 April 1980

Al-Jaish	1–1 (a.e.t.)	Al-Talaba
Farhan		Ali; Khudhor (penalty missed)
Penalties
	4–2

Al-Shaab Stadium, Baghdad
Referee: Subhi Adeeb

Iraq FA Cup
1979–80 winner
Al-Jaish
1st title

== Top scorers ==
Rank	Player	Club	Goals
1	Salim Malakh	Al-Tayaran	4
1	Thamer Yousif	Al-Zawraa	4
3	Mahdi Jassim	Al-Zawraa	3
3	Sabah Ibrahim	Al-Jaish	3
3	Hussein Saeed	Al-Talaba	3
