= Sahib Abbas =

Iraqi footballer (born 1969)

Personal information
- Full name: Sahib Abbas Hussein
- Date of birth: 3 November 1969 (age 57)
- Place of birth: Karbala, Iraq
- Position: Striker

Senior career*
| Years | Team | Apps | (Gls) |
| 1988–1990 | Al-Jamahir | | |
| 1990–1991 | Karbalaa | | |
| 1991–1993 | Salahaddin | | (42) |
| 1993–1998 | Al-Zawra | | (62) |
| 1998–1999 | Nejmeh | | (4) |
| 1999–2000 | Salam Zgharta | | (14) |
| 2001 | Al-Hussein Irbid | | (5) |
| 2001–2002 | Al-Talaba | | (18) |
| 2002–2003 | Al-Hussein Irbid | | (1) |
| 2003 | Al-Ahli Manama | | |
| 2003–2004 | Al-Shabab Manama | | (21) |
| 2004–2009 | Karbalaa | | (50) |
| 2006–2007 | → Afrin (loan) | | |
| 2009–2010 | Al-Sinaa | | (5) |
| 2011–2012 | Karbalaa | | (0) |

International career
| 1996–2001 | Iraq | 8 | (2) |

Managerial career
- 2010–2011: Al-Hindiya
- * Club domestic league appearances and goals

Sahib Abbas Hussein Abdul-Redha Al-Tameemi (Arabic: صَاحِب عَبَّاس حُسَيْن عَبْد الرِّضَا التَّمِيمِيّ; born 3 November 1969) is an Iraqi former professional footballer who played as a striker. He represented Iraq at the 1996 Asian Cup, and also played for various clubs in Iraq, Lebanon, Jordan, Bahrain, and Syria.

== Club career ==
Sahib Abbas was considered one of the best Iraqi strikers of his generation. After beginning his career at Karbalaa, Abbas moved to Salahaddin in 1991, playing as the main-choice striker. In 1993 he moved to Al-Zawraa—where he made his name—helping the club, featuring the likes Hussam Fawzi and Essam Hamad, to two consecutive league and cup doubles in 1995 and 1996.

In 1998, he joined top Lebanese club Al-Nejmeh, playing there for a season without hitting the headlines. After an unimpressive season with the ‘Reds’, he joined lowly club Salam Zghorta in 1999, a team battling to keep its 1st division status. Thanks to Sahib's devastating performances the club avoided relegated with Sahib scoring 14 goals in 22 games, quite an achievement considering the team only scored 32 goals all season. After becoming Lebanese joint top scorer with Al-Ansar's Brazilian Toninho Cruz, winning the Golden Boot, he returned to Iraq and joining Al-Talaba, winning a league and cup double in 2002.

He continued to play for clubs in Jordan, Bahrain and Syria and in 2012, Sahib finally hung up his boots with his home city club Karbala finishing his career with 177 Iraqi league goals.

== International career ==
Abbas was a member of the 1996 Asian Cup squad and the 1998 World Cup qualifying team.

== Career statistics ==
=== International ===
Scores and results list Iraq's goal tally first, score column indicates score after each Abbas goal.

List of international goals scored by Sahib Abbas
| No. | Date | Venue | Opponent | Score | Result | Competition |
|---|---|---|---|---|---|---|
| 1 | 20 June 1997 | Al-Shaab Stadium, Baghdad, Iraq | Pakistan | 4–1 | 6–1 | 1998 FIFA World Cup qualification |
| 2 | 20 June 1997 | Al-Shaab Stadium, Baghdad, Iraq | Pakistan | 6–1 | 6–1 | 1998 FIFA World Cup qualification |

== Honours ==
Al-Zawra

- Iraqi Premier League: 1993–94, 1994–95, 1995–96
- Iraq FA Cup: 1993–94, 1994–95, 1995–96, 1997–98

Al-Talaba

- Iraqi Premier League: 2001–02
- Iraq FA Cup: 2001–02

Al-Ahli Manama

- Bahraini King's Cup: 2003

Al-Shabab Manama

- Bahraini King's Cup: 2004

Individual

- Lebanese Premier League top goalscorer: 1999–2000 (Note: Tied with Toninho dos Santos)
- Iraqi Premier League top goalscorer: 2005–06

== Bibliography ==
- Al-Sabti, Ali (2014). Iraqi League History 1974-2011. Iraq.
