= 1978–79 Iraqi National League =

Iraqi National League
- Season: 1978–79
- Champions: Al-Zawraa (3rd title)
- Relegated: Al-Ittihad; Al-Thawra
- Top goalscorer: Falah Hassan (7 goals)

The 1978–79 Iraqi National Clubs First Division League was the 5th season of the competition since its foundation in 1974. Al-Zawraa won their third league title in four seasons, doing so without losing a game, and also won the 1978–79 Iraq FA Cup to secure the double for the second time.

== Name changes ==
- Al-Iktisad renamed to Al-Tijara.
- Al-Jamiea became known as Al-Talaba after merging with a new club of the same name.

== League table ==
Pos	Team	Pld	W	D	L	GF	GA	GD	Pts	Qualification or relegation
1	Al-Zawraa	12	7	5	0	22	5	+17	19	League Champions and FA Cup Winners
2	Al-Shorta	12	5	5	2	19	10	+9	15	
3	Al-Talaba	12	6	3	3	17	11	+6	15 (Note: Al-Talaba ranked ahead of Al-Minaa, and Al-Minaa ranked ahead of Al-Tayaran, both by number of wins due to equal points and goal difference.)	
4	Al-Minaa	12	5	5	2	15	9	+6	15	
5	Al-Tayaran	12	4	7	1	15	9	+6	15	
6	Al-Jaish	12	5	3	4	10	10	0	13	
7	Al-Sinaa	12	4	5	3	13	15	−2	13	
8	Al-Shabab	12	3	5	4	10	13	−3	11	
9	Al-Tijara	12	4	3	5	9	14	−5	11	
10	Al-Amana	12	4	3	5	13	19	−6	11	
11	Salahaddin	12	2	4	6	10	15	−5	8	
12	Al-Ittihad	12	2	3	7	7	13	−6	7	Relegated to Iraqi National Second Division
13	Al-Thawra	12	1	1	10	12	29	−17	3	Relegated to Iraqi National Second Division

Source: Ali Al-Sabti Archive

== Results ==
Home \ Away	AMN	ITT	JSH	MIN	SHB	SHR	SIN	TLB	TAY	THW	TJR	ZWR	SAL
Al-Amana				1–0		1–1	2–0			3–1 (Note: Al-Thawra fans assaulted referee Hamid Mousa in their match with Al-Sinaa, forcing him to withdraw from the match. As a result, the IFA punished Al-Thawra by awarding 3–1 wins to the opponents of their last four matches (Al-Jaish, Al-Ittihad, Al-Shorta and Al-Amana). The result of 3–1 was chosen as this was the scoreline of Al-Thawra's heaviest defeat in the competition up to that point.)	0–0		3–2
Al-Ittihad	2–1					1–1				3–1			
Al-Jaish	2–1	1–0					1–0			3–1			1–0
Al-Minaa		1–0	2–1			1–1		1–0	3–0	3–1	0–0	1–1	1–1
Al-Shabab	1–1	1–1	0–0	1–0							2–0		1–0
Al-Shorta			3–0		3–1		0–0			3–1	5–2		1–0
Al-Sinaa		2–0		2–2	2–1			1–1	1–1	2–0	1–0		1–1
Al-Talaba	3–0	2–0	0–0		3–0	1–0				3–1		2–2	2–1
Al-Tayaran	2–0	0–0	0–0		0–0	1–1		3–0			2–0		4–2
Al-Thawra					3–2				1–1				
Al-Tijara		1–0	2–1					2–0		2–1			0–0
Al-Zawraa	5–0	1–0	1–0		0–0	1–0	6–1		1–1	2–0	2–0		0–0
Salahaddin		1–0								2–1			

Source: Ali Al-Sabti Archive
Legend: Blue = home team win; Yellow = draw; Red = away team win.

== Season statistics ==
=== Top scorers ===
Pos	Scorer	Goals	Team
1	Falah Hassan	7	Al-Zawraa
2	Hussein Saeed	6	Al-Talaba
3	Haris Mohammed	5	Al-Talaba

=== Hat-tricks ===
Player	For	Against	Result
(Iraq) Ali Hussein Mahmoud	Al-Shorta	Al-Tijara	5–2
