= 1983–84 Iraq FA Cup =

Tournament details
- Country: Iraq

Final positions
- Champions: Al-Sinaa (1st title)
- Runners-up: Al-Shabab

The 1983–84 Iraq FA Cup was the eighth edition of the Iraq FA Cup as a club competition. The tournament was won by Al-Sinaa for the first time, beating Al-Shabab 5–4 on penalties in the final after a 0–0 draw on 14 June 1984. Al-Shabab reached the final by beating Al-Tijara, who had earlier knocked out Al-Zawraa 2–1 and Qiwa Al-Amn Al-Dakhili on penalties after a 0–0 draw.

== Bracket ==
From the quarter-finals onwards:

Quarter-finals; 28 May–7 June 1984
Al-Sinaa (p)	1 (5)
Al-Talaba	1 (4)
Salahaddin	1
Al-Jaish	0
Al-Shabab	1
Al-Tayaran	0
Al-Tijara	2
Al-Zawraa	1

Semi-finals; 2–10 June 1984
Al-Sinaa	2
Salahaddin	0
Al-Shabab	3
Al-Tijara	1

Final; 14 June 1984
Al-Sinaa (p)	0 (5)
Al-Shabab	0 (4)

== Matches ==
=== Final ===
14 June 1984

Al-Sinaa	0–0 (a.e.t.)	Al-Shabab
Penalties
	5–4

Iraq FA Cup
1983–84 winner
Al-Sinaa
1st title
