= 1993–94 Iraq FA Cup =

Tournament details
- Country: Iraq
- Dates: 23 August 1993 – 28 April 1994

Final positions
- Champions: Al-Zawraa (9th title)
- Runners-up: Al-Talaba

Tournament statistics
- Top goal scorer(s): Sahib Abbas (6 goals)

The 1993–94 Iraq FA Cup was the 17th edition of the Iraq FA Cup as a club competition. The tournament was won by Al-Zawraa for the second consecutive time and the ninth time in their history, beating Al-Talaba 1–0 in the final. The previous rounds saw Al-Zawraa beat Al-Falluja 11–0, Al-Karkh 1–0, Karbala 3–1 and Al-Shorta 4–1, while Al-Talaba beat Al-Hilla 9–0 and knocked out Al-Quwa Al-Jawiya 4–3 on penalties in the semi-finals after a 1–1 draw. Al-Zawraa also won the 1993–94 Iraqi National League to complete the double.

== Bracket ==
From the semi-finals onwards:

Semi-finals
Al-Zawraa	4
Al-Shorta	1
Al-Talaba (p)	1 (4)
Al-Quwa Al-Jawiya	1 (3)

Final; 28 April 1994
Al-Zawraa	1
Al-Talaba	0

== Matches ==
=== Semi-finals ===
Al-Zawraa	4–1	Al-Shorta
Abid Nader (pen.) (pen.); Hamad; Abdul-Hussein		Bakhit; Jadieh (red card)

Al-Shaab Stadium, Baghdad

Al-Talaba	1–1 (a.e.t.)	Al-Quwa Al-Jawiya
Kareem		Emmanuel (penalty missed) ,
Penalties
Shakir (penalty scored); Kadhim (penalty scored); Jeayer (penalty scored); Haydar (penalty scored)	4–3	(penalty scored) Dhahid; (penalty scored) Saadoun; (penalty scored) Abdul-Kadhim; (penalty missed) Emmanuel; (penalty missed) Hadi

Al-Shaab Stadium, Baghdad

=== Final ===
28 April 1994

Al-Zawraa	1–0	Al-Talaba
Saddam

Al-Shaab Stadium, Baghdad

Iraq FA Cup
1993–94 winner
Al-Zawraa
9th title
