= 1981–82 Iraq FA Cup =

Tournament details
- Country: Iraq
- Dates: 12 February – 17 June 1982
- Teams: 43

Final positions
- Champions: Al-Zawraa (4th title)
- Runners-up: Al-Talaba

The 1981–82 Iraq FA Cup was the sixth edition of the Iraq FA Cup as a club competition. The tournament was won by Al-Zawraa for the fourth time, beating 1981–82 Iraqi National League champions Al-Talaba 2–1 in the final. Al-Zawraa qualified for the final by beating Al-Tayaran 2–1 in the semi-final with goals from Thamir Yousef and Ahmed Radhi. The biggest win in the tournament was Al-Talaba's 8–0 win over Samarra in Tikrit on 2 June.

== Bracket ==
From the quarter-finals onwards:

Quarter-finals; 8 June 1982
Al-Zawraa	4
Al-Fotuwa	0
Al-Tayaran	1
Al-Najaf	0
Al-Talaba	3
Al-Jaish	1
Al-Amana	W
Unknown	L

Semi-finals; 14 June 1982
Al-Zawraa	2
Al-Tayaran	1
Al-Talaba	2
Al-Amana	0

Final; 17 June 1982
Al-Zawraa	2
Al-Talaba	1

== Matches ==
=== Final ===
17 June 1982

Al-Zawraa	2–1	Al-Talaba
Abdul-Wahid 62'; Fadhil 63'		Dirjal 81'

Al-Shaab Stadium, Baghdad
Referee: Subhi Adib

Iraq FA Cup
1981–82 winner
Al-Zawraa
4th title
