= Karim Darwich =

Association football player (born 1998)

- Darwich with Lebanon in 2024

Personal information
- Full name: Karim Al Abed Darwich
- Date of birth: 2 November 1998 (age 28)
- Place of birth: Berlin, Germany
- Height: 1.88 m (6 ft 2 in)
- Position: Striker

Team information
- Current team: Al-Nahda (on loan from Ahed)

Youth career
- 2015–2017: Viktoria Berlin

Senior career*
Years	Team	Apps	(Gls)
2017	Viktoria Berlin	1	(0)
2017–2018	SV Altlüdersdorf	9	(2)
2018	Nejmeh	5	(2)
2018–2019	→ Akhaa Ahli Aley (loan)	18	(3)
2019–2020	Akhaa Ahli Aley	2	(1)
2020	→ Ahed (loan)	0	(0)
2020–2023	Ansar	50	(12)
2023–	Ahed	26	(13)
2024–2026	→ Duhok (loan)	60	(13)
2026–	→ Al-Nahda (loan)	3	(2)

International career^{‡}
2019	Lebanon U23	3	(1)
2020–	Lebanon	34	(3)
- * Club domestic league appearances and goals as of 23 October 2026 ‡ National team caps and goals as of 4 June 2026

Karim Al Abed Darwich (Arabic: كريم العبد درويش; born 2 November 1998) is a professional footballer who plays as a striker for Oman Professional League club Al-Nahda, on loan from Lebanese Premier League club Ahed. Born in Germany, he plays for the Lebanon national team.

== Club career ==
=== Early career ===
Coming through the youth system, Darwich made his senior debut with Viktoria Berlin on 13 March 2017, as a 73rd-minute substitute in a 2–0 Regionalliga Nordost win against Carl Zeiss Jena in the 2016–17 season.

Darwich played for SV Altlüdersdorf in the Oberliga Nord during the 2017–18 season.

=== Nejmeh ===
On 3 January 2018, Darwich moved to Lebanese Premier League side Nejmeh; he scored two goals in five matches in the 2017–18 Lebanese Premier League.

=== Akhaa Ahli Aley ===
Darwich joined Akhaa Ahli Aley on loan in summer 2018, with whom he played 18 league games and scored three times in the 2018–19 season. He was purchased by Akhaa for the 2019–20 season, scoring a goal in two games in the cancelled league season.

Darwich had a short loan experience at Ahed in February 2020, playing in the 2020 AFC Cup.

=== Ansar ===
Darwich joined Ansar from Akhaa on 3 July 2020, in a deal worth $50,000. In the 2020–21 season, he helped Ansar win their first league title since 2007, and their 14th overall. Darwich also helped Ansar win the double, beating Nejmeh in the 2020–21 Lebanese FA Cup final on penalty shoot-outs.

=== Ahed ===
On 17 March 2023, Ahed announced the signing of Darwich on a five-year contract. He played 33 games during the 2023–24 season, scoring 13 goals and providing five assists.

=== Duhok ===
In October 2024, Darwich joined Duhok in the Iraqi Stars League. He helped the club lift the 2024–25 AGCFF Gulf Club Champions League, after defeating Kuwaiti club Qadsia in the final on 15 April 2025. On 18 July 2025, Darwich scored the decisive penalty in the 2025 Iraq FA Cup final, which Duhok won after penalties; he was also the tournament's top scorer with five goals. Ten days later, Duhok renewed Darwich's contract for a further season.

=== Al-Nahda ===
In August 2026, Darwich joined Al-Nahda in the Oman Professional League. He scored a brace against Sur on 19 October, helping his side win 5–1.

== International career ==
Born in Germany, Darwich is of Lebanese descent. He played for the Lebanon U23s at the 2020 AFC U-23 Championship qualification. Darwich made his debut for the senior team in a friendly against Bahrain on 12 November 2020. He scored his first goal on 9 June 2023, a penalty against Vanuatu in the Intercontinental Cup.

== Career statistics ==
=== International ===
As of match played 4 June 2026

Appearances and goals by national team and year
National team	Year	Apps	Goals
Lebanon	2020	1	0
Lebanon	2021	2	0
Lebanon	2022	4	0
Lebanon	2023	16	3
Lebanon	2024	6	0
Lebanon	2025	4	0
Lebanon	2026	1	0
Total		34	3

Scores and results list Lebanon's goal tally first, score column indicates score after each Darwich goal.

List of international goals scored by Karim Darwich
No.	Date	Venue	Opponent	Score	Result	Competition
1	9 June 2023	Kalinga Stadium, Bhubaneswar, India	Vanuatu	3–1	3–1	2023 Intercontinental Cup
2	12 October 2023	Podgorica City Stadium, Podgorica, Montenegro	Montenegro	1–2	2–3	Friendly
3	17 October 2023	Al Maktoum Stadium, Dubai, United Arab Emirates	United Arab Emirates	1–1	1–2	Friendly

== Honours ==
Ansar

- Lebanese Premier League: 2020–21
- Lebanese FA Cup: 2020–21; runner-up: 2021–22
- Lebanese Super Cup: 2021; runner-up: 2023
- Lebanese Elite Cup runner-up: 2022

Ahed

- Lebanese Federation Cup: 2023
- Lebanese FA Cup runner-up: 2023–24
- AFC Cup runner-up: 2023–24

Duhok

- Iraq FA Cup: 2024–25
- AGCFF Gulf Club Champions League: 2024–25

Individual

- Iraq FA Cup top scorer: 2024–25

== See also ==
- List of Lebanon international footballers born outside Lebanon
