= Iraq FA Cup =

- Organiser(s): Iraq Football Association
- Founded: 1948; 78 years ago (institutions); 1975; 51 years ago (clubs)
- Region: Iraq
- Teams: 40
- Qualifier for: AFC Champions League Two
- Domestic cup: Iraqi Super Cup
- Current champions: Duhok (1st title)
- Most championships: Al-Zawraa (16 titles)
- Broadcaster(s): Al-Iraqiya TV; Al-Kass Sports
- 2025–26 Iraq FA Cup

The Iraq Cup (Arabic: كأس العراق), commonly known as the Iraq FA Cup, is an annual knockout football competition in men's domestic Iraqi football organised by the Iraq Football Association. First held in the 1948–49 season for clubs and institutions, it returned in the 1975–76 season as a clubs-only competition.

The tournament begins with the first round, which is played between the 16 lowest-placed clubs from the Iraqi Premier Division League based on league positions in the previous season. The four highest-placed clubs from the Iraqi Premier Division League and all 20 clubs from the Iraq Stars League enter the competition in the round of 32. This is followed by the round of 16, the quarter-finals, the semi-finals and the final which is played at a neutral venue.

The winners of the competition are awarded a place in the next season's AFC Champions League Two group stage. The winners and runners-up both qualify for the Iraqi Super Cup which is played at the start of the following season.

Al-Zawraa are the most successful club with 16 titles. Duhok are the current holders, having beaten Zakho 5–3 on penalties after a 0–0 draw in the 2025 final.

== History ==
=== Foundation and development ===
The Iraq Football Association was founded on 8 October 1948 and within its first week it had decided to hold a national knockout cup called the Iraq Football Association Cup for clubs and institute-representative teams. The tournament kicked off on 21 January 1949 and culminated in Sharikat Naft Al-Basra winning the final on 7 April. For the next 26 years, cup tournaments for clubs and institutions were played at a regional level (such as the Iraq FA Baghdad Cup which was played in the 1973–74 season) until the national knockout cup competition returned as a clubs-only competition in 1975 as the Iraq Cup.

Al-Shaab Stadium was chosen by the Iraq FA to host the cup finals as it was able to accommodate the large number of spectators in the capital city. The first club to win the double was Al-Zawraa, winning the 1975–76 Iraqi National League and the 1975–76 Iraq FA Cup. Overall, Al-Zawraa have eight doubles while Al-Quwa Al-Jawiya have three, Al-Rasheed have two, and Al-Talaba and Al-Shorta each have one.

In the 1976–77 season, the tournament was not held due to scheduling difficulties, and in the 1984–85 season, it was cancelled at the semi-final stage to allow the Iraq national team to prepare for their 1986 FIFA World Cup qualifying matches, which was the same reason why the 1984–85 Iraqi National League was cancelled. The cup was also not held the following season, but returned for the 1986–87 campaign. It was also not held in the 2000–01 season due to scheduling difficulties.

The 2003 edition of the Iraq FA Cup Final was hosted in Erbil at the Franso Hariri Stadium for security reasons. The tournament was not held from the 2003–04 season up until the 2011–12 season as the Iraq War caused travel problems for clubs and difficulties with scheduling. The cup finally returned in the 2012–13 season, but was eventually cancelled midway through due to scheduling difficulties with the 2012–13 Iraqi Elite League.

It was not held again until the FA decided to hold it in the 2015–16 season. This time, the cup was not cancelled, although a large number of Premier League teams withdrew from the competition. The 2016 Iraq FA Cup Final was the first Iraq FA Cup final held for 13 years, and was played between Baghdad rivals Al-Zawraa and Al-Quwa Al-Jawiya with the latter winning 2–0. In the first edition of the tournament, there were 25 teams; by the 2021–22 season, there was an all-time high of 168 teams in the tournament. Al-Minaa are the only team to have participated in every edition of the tournament since 1948–49.

=== Cup runs and giant killings ===
Lower division teams have knocked out top-flight sides on numerous occasions. In the cup's first season in 1948–49, Baghdad top-flight side Wizarat Al-Maarif lost 3–2 to second-tier team Al-Tayour Al-Zarqaa in the second round. In the 1977–78 edition of the cup, the second team of Al-Tayaran (Al-Tayaran B), who played in the second-tier, eliminated Al-Jaish, who finished in fourth place in the 1977–78 Iraqi National League, from the first round of the cup with a 1–0 win. In the same edition, Al-Zawraa were defeated by second-tier team Al-Bahri in the quarter-finals, 2–1. In the 1982–83 edition, second-tier club Al-Hudood knocked out Arab Club Champions Cup holders Al-Shorta on penalties.

In the 1989–90 edition, Al-Rasheed, who had won the Premier League in each of the past three seasons and the FA Cup in two of the past three seasons, were defeated by second-tier club Al-Tijara 3–2 on aggregate in the Round of 16. In the 1992–93 edition, Al-Tijara pulled off another shock by defeating Al-Shorta in the first round, 2–1, and they also defeated another top-flight team in Al-Jaish in the Round of 16 with the same result. The 2016–17 Iraq FA Cup saw two major upsets in the Round of 32 as Al-Naft lost 3–2 at home to second-tier club Al-Sinaa and Al-Shorta lost 3–1 at home to second-tier club Al-Jaish.

== Trophy ==
=== Current design from 2022 ===
The Iraq FA Cup trophy is designed in the shape of a tree with eighteen roots, branches and leaves encircling a ball. The number eighteen refers to the eighteen governorates of Iraq. The image of Iraq as a tree is a metaphor suggesting that the nation may fall ill (just like a tree in autumn) but will inevitably bloom again. Unveiled on 6 April 2022, the trophy is the work of the famous sculptor Ahmed Albahrani who also designed the 2015 World Men's Handball Championship trophy.

The trophy is kept by the Iraq Football Association and only a replica model is given permanently to the winning club.

== List of finals ==
Winning team won the Double

Season	Winner	Result	Runner-up
Iraq FA Cup (Institutions)
1948–49	Sharikat Naft Al-Basra	2–1	Al-Kuliya Al-Askariya Al-Malakiya
Iraq FA Cup (Clubs)
1975–76	Al-Zawraa	5–0	Al-Baladiyat
1976–77	Not held		
1977–78	Al-Tayaran (Note: Now known as Al-Quwa Al-Jawiya.)	1–1 (a.e.t.) (5–3 p)	Al-Shorta
1978–79	Al-Zawraa	3–1	Al-Jaish
1979–80	Al-Jaish	1–1 (a.e.t.) (4–2 p)	Al-Talaba
1980–81	Al-Zawraa	1–0	Al-Talaba
1981–82	Al-Zawraa	2–1	Al-Talaba
1982–83	Al-Jaish	2–1	Al-Shabab
1983–84	Al-Sinaa	0–0 (a.e.t.) (5–4 p)	Al-Shabab
1984–85	Cancelled at semi-finals		
1985–86	Not held		
1986–87	Al-Rasheed	1–1 (a.e.t.) (4–3 p)	Al-Jaish
1987–88	Al-Rasheed	0–0 (a.e.t.) (4–3 p)	Al-Zawraa
1988–89	Al-Zawraa	3–0	Al-Tayaran
1989–90	Al-Zawraa	0–0 (a.e.t.) (2–1 p)	Al-Shabab
1990–91	Al-Zawraa	1–1 (a.e.t.) (4–3 p)	Al-Jaish
1991–92	Al-Quwa Al-Jawiya	2–1	Al-Tayaran (Note: Now known as Al-Khutoot Al-Jawiya.)
1992–93	Al-Zawraa	2–1	Al-Talaba
1993–94	Al-Zawraa	1–0	Al-Talaba
1994–95	Al-Zawraa	3–0	Al-Jaish
1995–96	Al-Zawraa	2–1	Al-Shorta
1996–97	Al-Quwa Al-Jawiya	1–1 (a.e.t.) (7–6 p)	Al-Shorta
1997–98	Al-Zawraa	1–1 (a.e.t.) (4–3 p)	Al-Quwa Al-Jawiya
1998–99	Al-Zawraa	1–0 (g.g.)	Al-Talaba
1999–2000	Al-Zawraa	0–0 (a.e.t.) (4–3 p)	Al-Quwa Al-Jawiya
2000–01	Not held		
2001–02	Al-Talaba	1–0	Al-Shorta
2002–03	Al-Talaba	1–0	Al-Shorta
2003–12	Not held		
2012–13	Cancelled at round of 32		
2013–15	Not held		
2015–16	Al-Quwa Al-Jawiya	2–0	Al-Zawraa
2016–17	Al-Zawraa	1–0	Naft Al-Wasat
2017–18	Not held		
2018–19	Al-Zawraa	1–0	Al-Kahrabaa
2019–20	Cancelled at round of 32		
2020–21	Al-Quwa Al-Jawiya	0–0 (4–2 p)	Al-Zawraa
2021–22	Al-Karkh	2–1	Al-Kahrabaa
2022–23	Al-Quwa Al-Jawiya	1–0	Erbil
2023–24	Al-Shorta	1–0	Al-Quwa Al-Jawiya
2024–25	Duhok	0–0 (a.e.t.) (5–3 p)	Zakho
2025–26	Cancelled at round of 16		

== Most successful teams ==
=== Clubs ===
Team	Winners	Runners-up	Years won	Years runner-up
Al-Zawraa	16	3	1976, 1979, 1981, 1982, 1989, 1990, 1991, 1993, 1994, 1995, 1996, 1998, 1999, 2000, 2017, 2019	1988, 2016, 2021
Al-Quwa Al-Jawiya	6	4	1978, 1992, 1997, 2016, 2021, 2023	1989, 1998, 2000, 2024
Al-Talaba	2	6	2002, 2003	1980, 1981, 1982, 1993, 1994, 1999
Al-Jaish	2	4	1980, 1983	1979, 1987, 1991, 1995
Al-Rasheed	2	0	1987, 1988	—
Al-Shorta	1	5	2024	1978, 1996, 1997, 2002, 2003
Al-Sinaa	1	0	1984	—
Al-Karkh	1	0	2022	—
Duhok	1	0	2025	—
Al-Shabab	0	3	—	1983, 1984, 1990
Al-Kahrabaa	0	2	—	2019, 2022
Al-Baladiyat	0	1	—	1976
Al-Khutoot Al-Jawiya	0	1	—	1992
Naft Al-Wasat	0	1	—	2017
Erbil	0	1	—	2023
Zakho	0	1	—	2025

=== Institutions ===
Team	Institution	Winners	Runners-up	Years won	Years runner-up
Sharikat Naft Al-Basra	Basra Petroleum Company	1	0	1949	—
Al-Kuliya Al-Askariya Al-Malakiya	Royal Military College	0	1	—	1949

== Records and statistics ==
=== Final ===
- Most wins: 16, Al-Zawraa (1976, 1979, 1981, 1982, 1989, 1990, 1991, 1993, 1994, 1995, 1996, 1998, 1999, 2000, 2017, 2019)
- Most consecutive wins: 4, Al-Zawraa (1993, 1994, 1995, 1996)
- Most appearances in a final: 19, Al-Zawraa (1976, 1979, 1981, 1982, 1988, 1989, 1990, 1991, 1993, 1994, 1995, 1996, 1998, 1999, 2000, 2016, 2017, 2019, 2021)
- Most appearances without winning: 3, Al-Shabab (1983, 1984, 1990)
- Most appearances without losing: 2, Al-Rasheed (1987, 1988)
- Biggest final win: 5 goals, Al-Zawraa 5–0 Al-Baladiyat (1976)
- Most goals in a final: 5, Al-Zawraa 5–0 Al-Baladiyat (1976)
- Most final defeats: 6, Al-Talaba (1980, 1981, 1982, 1993, 1994, 1999)

=== All rounds ===
==== Team ====
- Biggest win: Al-Jaish 14–0 Babil (12 September 1987)
- Most clubs competing for trophy in a season: 168 (2021–22)

==== Individual ====
- Most goals by a player in a single tournament: 14, Hashim Ridha (1998–99)
- Most goals by a player in a single game: 5 – joint record:
  - Saeed Nouri (for Al-Shorta v. Salahaddin, 1988–89)
  - Sahib Abbas (for Al-Zawraa v. Al-Falluja, 1993–94)
  - Mahmoud Karim (for Al-Zawraa v. Al-Qasim, 1997–98)
  - Mohammed Khoshnaw (for Erbil v. Makhmur, 1998–99)
  - Mahmoud Kadhim (for Erbil v. Makhmur, 1998–99)
- Fastest goal: 6 seconds, Saif Raheem (for Al-Sulaikh v. Al-Jinsiya, 11 November 2021)

== List of winning managers ==
Season	Nationality	Winning manager	Club
Iraq FA Cup (Institutions)
1948–49	Iraq	Tommy Thomas	Sharikat Naft Al-Basra
Iraq FA Cup (Clubs)
1975–76	Iraq	Saadi Salih	Al-Zawraa
1977–78	Iraq	Abdelilah Mohammed Hassan	Al-Tayaran
1978–79	Iraq	Anwar Jassam	Al-Zawraa
1979–80	Iraq	Muayad Mohammed Salih	Al-Jaish
1980–81	Iraq	Anwar Jassam	Al-Zawraa
1981–82	Iraq	Anwar Jassam	Al-Zawraa
1982–83	Poland	Wojciech Przybylski	Al-Jaish
1983–84	Hungary	Géza Vincze	Al-Sinaa
1986–87	Iraq	Nasrat Nassir	Al-Rasheed
1987–88	Iraq	Jamal Salih	Al-Rasheed
1988–89	Iraq	Falah Hassan	Al-Zawraa
1989–90	Iraq	Falah Hassan	Al-Zawraa
1990–91	Iraq	Falah Hassan	Al-Zawraa
1991–92	Iraq	Adil Yousef	Al-Quwa Al-Jawiya
1992–93	Iraq	Anwar Jassam	Al-Zawraa
1993–94	Iraq	Ammo Baba	Al-Zawraa
1994–95	Iraq	Hadi Mutanash	Al-Zawraa
1995–96	Iraq	Adnan Hamad	Al-Zawraa
1996–97	Iraq	Ayoub Odisho	Al-Quwa Al-Jawiya
1997–98	Iraq	Anwar Jassam	Al-Zawraa
1998–99	Iraq	Amer Jameel	Al-Zawraa
1999–2000	Iraq	Adnan Hamad	Al-Zawraa
2001–02	Iraq	Thair Ahmed	Al-Talaba
2002–03	Iraq	Thair Ahmed	Al-Talaba
2015–16	Iraq	Ahmed Daham	Al-Quwa Al-Jawiya
2016–17	Iraq	Essam Hamad	Al-Zawraa
2018–19	Iraq	Hakeem Shaker	Al-Zawraa
2020–21	Iraq	Ayoub Odisho	Al-Quwa Al-Jawiya
2021–22	Iraq	Ahmed Abdul-Jabar	Al-Karkh
2022–23	Egypt	Moamen Soliman	Al-Quwa Al-Jawiya
2023–24	Egypt	Moamen Soliman	Al-Shorta
2024–25	Iraq	Sulaiman Ramadan	Duhok

=== Most successful managers ===
No.	Winning manager	Club(s)	No. titles
1	(Iraq) Anwar Jassam	Al-Zawraa	5
2	(Iraq) Falah Hassan	Al-Zawraa	3
3	(Iraq) Thair Ahmed	Al-Talaba	2
3	(Iraq) Adnan Hamad	Al-Zawraa	2
3	(Iraq) Ayoub Odisho	Al-Quwa Al-Jawiya	2
3	(Egypt) Moamen Soliman	Al-Quwa Al-Jawiya, Al-Shorta	2
