= 2019 Iraq FA Cup final =

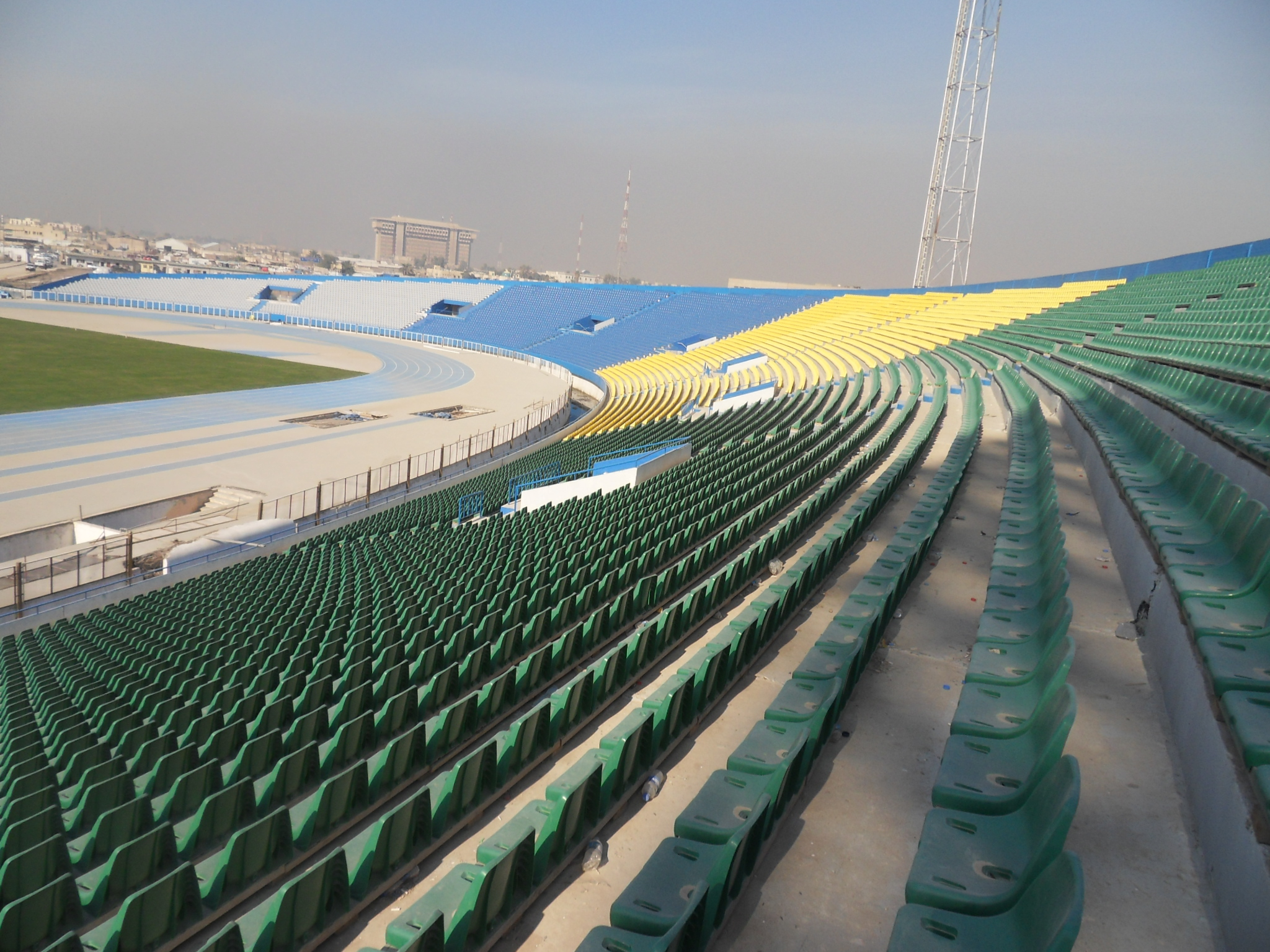
- The match took place at Al-Shaab Stadium
- Event: 2018–19 Iraq FA Cup
Al-Zawraa	Al-Kahrabaa
1	0
- Date: 26 July 2019
- Venue: Al-Shaab Stadium, Baghdad
- Referee: Wathik Mohammed Al-Baag

The 2019 Iraq FA Cup final was the 27th final of the Iraq FA Cup as a club competition. The match was contested between Al-Zawraa and Al-Kahrabaa, at Al-Shaab Stadium in Baghdad. It was played on 26 July 2019 to be the final match of the competition. Al-Zawraa made their record 18th appearance in the Iraq FA Cup final while Al-Kahrabaa made their first appearance. Al-Zawraa won the match 1–0 with a late goal from Safaa Hadi, for the club's record 16th title.

The winners of the cup, Al-Zawraa, qualified for the 2020 AFC Champions League preliminary round 2 as well as the 2019 Iraqi Super Cup.

== Route to the Final ==
Note: In all results below, the score of the finalist is given first (H: home; A: away).

Al-Zawraa				Round	Al-Kahrabaa			
Opponent	Agg.	1st leg	2nd leg	Two-legged ties	Opponent	Agg.	1st leg	2nd leg
Al-Kufa	8–0	6–0 (H)	2–0 (A)	Round of 32	Al-Hindiya	4–1	3–1 (H)	1–0 (A)
Erbil	2–1	0–0 (H)	2–1 (A)	Round of 16	Al-Shorta	2–1	1–0 (H)	1–1 (A)
Amanat Baghdad	3–0	1–0 (A)	2–0 (H)	Quarter-finals	Al-Hudood	2–2 (4–3 p.)	1–1 (H)	1–1 (A)
Opponent	Result			One-legged ties	Opponent	Result		
Al-Quwa Al-Jawiya	4–1			Semi-finals	Al-Talaba	3–0		

== Match ==
=== Details ===
26 July 2019
19:00 UTC+03:00

Al-Zawraa	1–0	Al-Kahrabaa
Hadi 86'

Al-Shaab Stadium, Baghdad
Referee: Wathik Mohammed Al-Baag

Al-Zawraa	Al-Kahrabaa

GK	12	(Iraq) Jalal Hassan
RB	2	(Iraq) Mustafa Mohammed
CB	29	(Iraq) Abbas Qasim
CB	14	(Iraq) Najm Shwan	(yellow card) 66'
LB	3	(Syria) Hussein Jwayed (c)	(yellow card) 89'
RM	6	(Iraq) Mohammed Ridha
CM	5	(Iraq) Safaa Hadi
CM	7	(Iraq) Ahmad Fadhel		(substituted off) 77'
LM	15	(Morocco) Omar Mansouri		(substituted off) 90+2'
CF	8	(Iraq) Mohannad Abdul-Raheem		(substituted off) 89'
CF	9	(Iraq) Alaa Abbas
Substitutions:
MF	77	(Iraq) Ameer Sabah		(substituted on) 77'
MF	25	(Iraq) Ali Raheem		(substituted on) 89'
MF	4	(Iraq) Mohammed Abdul-Zahra		(substituted on) 90+2'
Manager:
(Iraq) Hakeem Shaker

GK	12	(Iraq) Haidar Jamal Al-Deen
RB	32	(Iraq) Hassan Ashour
CB	13	(Cameroon) Gustave Moundi Djengue (c)
CB	25	(Iraq) Ali Khalid		(substituted off) 70'
LB	5	(Iraq) Saif Hatem
RM	9	(Iraq) Murad Mohammed
CM	14	(Ghana) Amissah Anfoh Assan	(yellow card) 27'
CM	19	(Iraq) Ali Mohsin
LM	17	(Iraq) Mohammed Ibrahim		(substituted off) 89'
CF	8	(Iraq) Sajjad Raad		(substituted off) 88'
CF	10	(Iraq) Alaa Mhaisen
Substitutions:
DF	6	(Iraq) Karrar Falih		(substituted on) 70'
FW	11	(Ivory Coast) Aboubakar Koné		(substituted on) 88'
MF	33	(Iraq) Mohammed Salim		(substituted on) 89'
Manager:
(Iraq) Abbas Attiya

Assistant referees:
Wathiq Modalil
Ahmed Sabah
Fourth official:
Maitham Khamat

Match rules

- 90 minutes.
- Penalty shoot-out if scores still level.
- Seven named substitutes, of which up to three may be used.
