= 1994–95 Iraqi National League =

Iraqi National League
- Season: 1994–95
- Champions: Al-Zawraa (6th title)
- Relegated: Diyala; Al-Kut; Al-Mosul; Karbala; Babil; Al-Nasiriya; Salahaddin; Al-Umal; Al-Amara; Erbil; Al-Diwaniya; Kirkuk
- 1996–97 Asian Club Championship: Al-Zawraa
- 1996–97 Asian Cup Winners' Cup: Al-Quwa Al-Jawiya
- Top goalscorer: Muayad Judi (30 goals)

The 1994–95 Iraqi National Clubs First Division League was the 21st season of the Iraqi National League. The league title was won by Al-Zawraa for the second time in a row, and they also won the Iraq FA Cup for the third consecutive time. Half of the league's competing teams were relegated in order to result in a 12-team league for the next season. In this season, three points were given for a win instead of two points, and four points were given for a win by three goals or more.

== League table ==
Pos	Team	Pld	W	D	L	GF	GA	GD	BP	Pts	Qualification or relegation
1	Al-Zawraa (C)	46	31	11	4	113	31	+82	16	120	1996–97 Asian Club Championship
2	Al-Quwa Al-Jawiya	46	28	12	6	109	45	+64	12	108	1996–97 Asian Cup Winners' Cup (Note: Although Al-Jaish were runners-up of the Iraq FA Cup (won by Al-Zawraa), the IFA decided to give the Cup Winners' Cup slot to league runners-up Al-Quwa Al-Jawiya.)
3	Al-Najaf	46	28	9	9	84	29	+55	14	107	
4	Al-Talaba	46	28	14	4	80	29	+51	8	106	
5	Al-Naft	46	28	9	9	88	43	+45	11	104	
6	Al-Shorta	46	26	12	8	91	49	+42	8	98	
7	Al-Karkh	46	25	12	9	98	53	+45	6	93	
8	Al-Jaish	46	20	12	14	81	63	+18	8	80	
9	Al-Sinaa	46	20	9	17	89	66	+23	9	78	
10	Samarra	46	17	17	12	70	55	+15	5	73	
11	Al-Minaa	46	16	21	9	54	42	+12	3	72	
12	Al-Ramadi	46	15	20	11	75	44	+31	6	71	
13	Diyala (R)	46	17	10	19	50	64	−14	3	64	Relegation to the Iraqi National Second Division
14	Al-Kut (R)	46	16	11	19	45	55	−10	4	63	Relegation to the Iraqi National Second Division
15	Karbala (R)	46	13	11	22	71	84	−13	5	55	Relegation to the Iraqi National Second Division
16	Al-Mosul (R)	46	14	11	21	44	66	−22	2	55	Relegation to the Iraqi National Second Division
17	Babil (R)	46	13	7	26	51	75	−24	5	51	Relegation to the Iraqi National Second Division
18	Al-Nasiriya (R)	46	10	14	22	38	77	−39	3	47	Relegation to the Iraqi National Second Division
19	Salahaddin (R)	46	11	12	23	45	75	−30	1	46	Relegation to the Iraqi National Second Division
20	Al-Umal (R)	46	9	11	26	38	75	−37	4	42	Relegation to the Iraqi National Second Division
21	Al-Amara (R)	46	10	11	25	29	68	−39	0	41	Relegation to the Iraqi National Second Division
22	Erbil (R)	46	4	14	28	42	126	−84	0	26	Relegation to the Iraqi National Second Division
23	Al-Diwaniya (R)	46	4	10	32	24	83	−59	0	22	Relegation to the Iraqi National Second Division
24	Kirkuk (R)	46	4	10	32	30	142	−112	0	22	Relegation to the Iraqi National Second Division

Source: Ali Al-Sabti Archive
Rules for classification: 1 bonus point was awarded for each game won by 3 or more goals.
(C) Champions; (R) Relegated

== Results ==
Home \ Away	AMR	DIW	JSH	KKH	KUT	MIN	MSL	NFT	NJF	NAS	QWJ	RMA	SHR	SIN	TLB	UML	ZWR	BBL	DYL	ERB	KRB	KRK	SAL	SMR
Al-Amara		1–0	2–2	1–0	1–0	0–0	1–0	1–0	0–3	0–1	0–2	0–2	1–2	1–1	0–1	1–0	0–0	1–0	0–3	2–2	1–0	0–0	0–1	2–2
Al-Diwaniya	0–2		0–3	0–2	0–1	0–0	0–1	2–1	0–1	1–0	0–4	1–2	3–5	1–1	0–3	0–0	2–2	1–1	1–2	2–2	1–3	0–0	0–1	1–2
Al-Jaish	3–1	1–0		2–2	2–1	0–0	2–0	0–1	3–1	1–0	2–3	2–2	1–3	2–1	0–4	0–1	2–3	3–0	1–0	8–1	4–1	7–1	3–2	1–3
Al-Karkh	5–0	2–0	2–0		0–3 (Note: The Al-Karkh–Al-Kut match originally ended as a 2–0 win for Al-Kut but was changed to a 3–0 win for the same team due to Al-Karkh making three substitutions, exceeding the limit of two.)	2–0	1–1	2–3	1–1	2–0	1–1	1–1	2–2	2–2	0–1	1–0	1–1	2–1	6–0	4–1	5–0	6–0	1–0	1–1
Al-Kut	1–0	0–0	1–0	1–1		0–4	2–0	0–2	1–3	1–1	1–1	2–0	0–1	1–0	0–1	0–0	1–4	1–0	0–1	5–0	1–0	3–0	1–0	0–0
Al-Minaa	2–1	2–0	1–1	0–2	5–0		1–0	1–1	0–0	2–0	0–1	2–2	0–0	1–0	0–0	6–1	2–2	1–0	1–0	0–0	4–2	1–1	2–0	1–1
Al-Mosul	4–1	2–0	2–1	2–1	1–1	0–0		2–2	3–1	2–0	0–1	1–0	0–0	0–1	0–0	0–0	0–1	3–2	2–1	2–4	3–1	2–0	1–1	0–1
Al-Naft	1–0	1–0	1–2	5–2	1–0	0–0	1–1		0–0	2–0	0–2	2–0	4–0	2–4	1–0	1–0	2–1	1–0	5–0	4–1	1–0	4–0	4–0	1–0
Al-Najaf	3–0	1–0	2–0	1–2	3–0	1–0	5–1	3–0		4–0	0–0	1–0	3–0	0–0	3–1	1–0	2–0	0–1	1–2	2–2	3–1	3–0	4–0	1–0
Al-Nasiriya	3–0	0–0	0–2	1–2	1–4	1–0	0–0	1–2	0–4		0–3	2–2	0–0	0–0	1–1	2–0	1–1	1–1	2–0	2–0	5–2	3–0	1–1	0–0
Al-Quwa Al-Jawiya	4–1	2–0	7–1	3–3	0–0	4–5	3–2	1–2	0–2	5–0		1–0	2–2	4–2	0–2	4–0	0–2	4–0	4–2	3–0	1–0	5–0	2–0	2–1
Al-Ramadi	3–1	0–1	0–0	0–2	1–1	1–1	1–0	1–1	2–0	4–0	2–2		1–1	4–0	1–1	1–0	0–0	4–0	0–0	5–0	1–1	11–0	5–0	3–1
Al-Shorta	2–1	6–1	1–1	6–2	3–1	0–0	4–0	1–1	2–0	6–0	2–2	4–1		2–3	0–2	2–1	1–2	3–1	2–1	5–2	1–0	4–1	2–0	2–0
Al-Sinaa	2–0	0–1	0–0	2–2	2–0	1–1	4–0	2–0	1–1	1–0	0–4	1–3	1–2		1–2	3–2	0–2	5–2	1–2	4–1	5–0	7–2	5–2	1–2
Al-Talaba	1–0	3–1	0–0	1–3	1–0	0–0	1–0	0–0	1–1	4–0	1–0	3–2	4–0	3–1		1–1	1–1	5–2	2–1	3–0	4–2	4–0	2–1	1–1
Al-Umal	2–1	4–1	0–5	0–1	2–1	0–0	3–0	0–3	0–3	0–1	0–7	1–1	0–1	0–3 (Note: The Al-Umal–Al-Sinaa match originally ended as a 1–0 win for Al-Umal but was changed to a 3–0 win for Al-Sinaa due to Al-Umal fielding an ineligible player.)	0–2		0–1	4–0	1–0	2–1	1–4	5–0	0–0	1–2
Al-Zawraa	5–0	3–0	9–0	1–0	0–1	6–0	7–0	3–0	3–1	3–0	1–1	1–1	1–0	2–3	2–1	2–1		3–0	3–0	5–0	3–1	4–1	3–2	2–1
Babil	0–1	1–0	0–3 (Note: The Babil–Al-Jaish match was awarded as a 3–0 win to Al-Jaish after the game had originally ended in a 1–0 win for Babil due to Babil fielding a player who avoided military service.)	3–2	3–0	1–2	0–1	2–5	0–0	5–0	0–0	1–0	0–2	2–1	0–1	0–0	0–1		3–0	0–1	2–2	5–0	1–0	4–1
Diyala	1–0	4–0	1–0	0–2	3–0	2–0	1–0	1–4	0–1	0–0	1–2	1–1	1–1	3–2	0–2	1–1	0–0	2–0		0–0	2–0	3–1	1–1	0–2
Erbil	1–1	0–0	1–1	2–7	2–1	1–2	0–3	0–6	0–3	3–3	1–4	0–0	0–2	0–5	0–5	1–1	1–5	2–2	1–1		2–1	1–2	1–2	1–2
Karbala	1–1	5–1	1–1	1–2	1–1	2–1	5–0	3–2	1–0	2–1	1–2	2–0	1–0	2–3	0–0	5–0	0–4	2–1	0–1	2–2		6–0	1–1	2–2
Kirkuk	0–0	3–1	0–6	1–3	2–3	0–0	2–2	1–2	0–5	1–3	2–2	1–3	0–3	1–4	1–2	1–0	0–4	0–1	3–3	1–0	0–0		0–1	1–1
Salahaddin	1–0	2–1	1–2	0–2	1–1	1–2	1–0	1–4	1–2	2–0	1–2	1–1	1–1	1–0	1–1	2–2	0–3	1–2	1–2	2–1	3–3	3–0		1–1
Samarra	1–1	1–0	0–0	1–3	1–2	4–1	1–0	2–2	0–4	1–1	2–2	0–0	0–2	1–3	1–1	2–1	1–1	3–1	4–0	4–0	5–1	6–0	2–0	

Source: Ali Al-Sabti Archive
Legend: Blue = home team win; Yellow = draw; Red = away team win.

== Season statistics ==
=== Top scorers ===
Pos	Scorer	Goals	Team
1	Muayad Judi	30	Al-Karkh
2	Sahib Abbas	27	Al-Zawraa
2	Shakir Mohammed Sabbar	27	Al-Ramadi

=== Hat-tricks ===
Player	For	Against	Result	Date
(Iraq) Fareed Jafar	Al-Quwa Al-Jawiya	Al-Sinaa	4–0	13 October 1994
(Iraq) Saad Qais	Al-Shorta	Al-Karkh	6–2	17 October 1994
(Iraq) Mohanad Zaidan	Al-Talaba	Al-Nasiriya	4–0	17 October 1994
(Iraq) Saad Qais^{4}	Al-Shorta	Al-Diwaniya	6–1	27 October 1994
(Iraq) Mufeed Assem^{5}	Al-Zawraa	Al-Jaish	9–0	27 October 1994
(Iraq) Yassir Abdul-Latif	Al-Naft	Salahaddin	4–1	3 November 1994
(Iraq) Alaa Abdul-Jabbar	Al-Shorta	Al-Mosul	4–0	24 November 1994
(Iraq) Haidar Yahya^{4}	Al-Talaba	Karbala	4–2	1 December 1994
(Iraq) Qahtan Chathir	Al-Sinaa	Kirkuk	7–2	1 December 1994
(Iraq) Qahtan Chathir	Al-Sinaa	Karbala	5–0	12 December 1994
(Iraq) Sattar Khalaf	Karbala	Al-Umal	5–0	15 December 1994
(Iraq) Adnan Mohammed	Al-Jaish	Kirkuk	7–1	22 December 1994
(Iraq) Jafar Yaseen	Kirkuk	Diyala	3–3	26 December 1994
(Iraq) Muayad Judi	Al-Karkh	Erbil	7–2	9 February 1995
(Iraq) Shakir Mohammed Sabbar	Al-Ramadi	Erbil	5–0	23 February 1995
(Iraq) Ali Raja	Al-Najaf	Samarra	4–0	23 February 1995
(Iraq) Maad Ibrahim	Al-Naft	Al-Shorta	4–0	13 March 1995
(Iraq) Fareed Jafar	Al-Quwa Al-Jawiya	Al-Jaish	7–1	16 March 1995
(Iraq) Haidar Hamil^{4}	Al-Kut	Erbil	5–0	23 March 1995
(Iraq) Qahtan Chathir	Al-Sinaa	Kirkuk	4–1	30 March 1995
(Iraq) Adel Nasser	Al-Minaa	Al-Umal	6–1	30 March 1995
(Iraq) Muayad Judi	Al-Karkh	Diyala	6–0	30 March 1995
(Iraq) Younis Abid Ali	Al-Shorta	Erbil	5–2	6 April 1995
(Iraq) Adnan Mohammed	Al-Jaish	Kirkuk	6–0	20 April 1995
(Iraq) Sahib Abbas	Al-Zawraa	Erbil	5–0	24 April 1995
(Iraq) Rahim Saeed	Al-Kut	Al-Nasiriya	4–1	4 May 1995
(Iraq) Shakir Mohammed Sabbar^{6}	Al-Ramadi	Kirkuk	11–0	15 May 1995
(Iraq) Ahmed Hameed	Diyala	Al-Kut	3–0	15 May 1995
(Iraq) Qasim Farhan	Al-Sinaa	Babil	5–2	15 May 1995

Notes

^{4} Player scored 4 goals
^{5} Player scored 5 goals
^{6} Player scored 6 goals
