= 1975–76 Iraqi National League =

Iraqi National League
- Season: 1975–76
- Champions: Al-Zawraa (1st title)
- Relegated: Diyala; Al-Samawa
- Top goalscorer: Thamer Yousif (13 goals)

The 1975–76 Iraqi National Clubs First Division League was the 2nd season of the competition since its foundation in 1974. Newly-promoted club Al-Zawraa won the league title and also won the Iraq FA Cup to complete the first national double in Iraqi football. Al-Zawraa's squad included many of the players that played for Al-Naqil in the 1974–75 season, a club that folded due to financial difficulties after finishing as league runners-up that campaign.

== League table ==
Pos	Team	Pld	W	D	L	GF	GA	GD	Pts	Qualification or relegation
1	Al-Zawraa	24	18	4	2	48	17	+31	40	League Champions and FA Cup Winners
2	Al-Tayaran	24	15	5	4	37	17	+20	35	
3	Al-Shorta	24	14	5	5	41	16	+25	33	
4	Al-Minaa	24	12	7	5	29	18	+11	31	
5	Al-Baladiyat	24	9	8	7	29	23	+6	26	
6	Al-Jaish	24	9	7	8	26	20	+6	25	
7	Al-Iktisad	24	8	7	9	24	28	−4	23	
8	Al-Jamiea	24	6	8	10	16	23	−7	20	
9	Al-Sinaa	24	5	9	10	15	29	−14	19	
10	Al-Hilla	24	5	7	12	20	30	−10	17	
11	Babil	24	5	7	12	17	36	−19	17	
12	Diyala	24	4	7	13	18	38	−20	15	Relegated to Iraqi National Second Division
13	Al-Samawa	24	3	5	16	17	42	−25	11	Relegated to Iraqi National Second Division

Source: Ali Al-Sabti Archive

== Results ==
Home \ Away	BLD	HLL	IKT	JSH	JAM	MIN	SMW	SHR	SIN	TAY	ZWR	BBL	DYL
Al-Baladiyat		2–1	1–1	0–2	0–0	1–2	2–0	2–0	1–1	1–1	1–2	1–0	3–0
Al-Hilla	0–0		1–1	0–1	0–0	1–2	1–0	2–1	0–1	2–1	1–2	2–0	0–0
Al-Iktisad	1–3	4–1		3–2	1–0	0–0	2–1	0–0	1–1	1–2	0–3	0–1	3–0
Al-Jaish	2–0	3–0	0–0		0–2	0–0	2–0	1–0	1–0	1–1	1–2	0–0	3–0
Al-Jamiea	0–2	1–1	0–1	0–0		0–2	1–0	0–1	1–1	1–3	0–1	0–0	1–0
Al-Minaa	1–0	1–1	3–0	2–1	2–1		1–0	3–1	0–0	1–1	0–2	0–2	2–2
Al-Samawa	1–1	2–1	1–2	1–1	1–1	0–1		0–5	0–0	0–4	0–2	3–1	1–2
Al-Shorta	1–1	2–1	0–0	1–0	2–0	1–0	5–0		1–0	2–1	1–2	5–0	1–1
Al-Sinaa	0–1	1–0	1–0	1–2	2–2	0–3	2–1	0–4		0–1	1–1	0–2	1–0
Al-Tayaran	2–1	1–0	2–0	2–1	0–1	1–0	2–0	0–1	3–1		1–0	2–0	1–0
Al-Zawraa	2–1	4–1	3–0	1–0	1–2	2–1	1–1	1–1	3–0	1–1		4–1	4–1
Babil	2–3	0–0	0–2	2–0	2–1	1–1	0–3	0–3	0–0	2–2	0–2		0–0
Diyala	1–1	0–3	2–1	2–2	0–1	0–1	2–1	1–2	1–1	0–2	1–2	2–1	

Source: Ali Al-Sabti Archive
Legend: Blue = home team win; Yellow = draw; Red = away team win.

== Season statistics ==
=== Top scorers ===
Pos	Scorer	Goals	Team
1	Thamer Yousif	13	Al-Zawraa
2	Zahrawi Jaber	12	Al-Shorta
3	Falah Hassan	11	Al-Zawraa
3	Kadhim Waal	11	Al-Tayaran

=== Hat-tricks ===
Player	For	Against	Result
(Iraq) Falah Hassan	Al-Zawraa	Al-Hilla	4–1
(Iraq) Zahrawi Jaber	Al-Shorta	Al-Samawa	5–0
(Iraq) Jassim Mohammed	Al-Hilla	Diyala	3–0
