= 2025 Iraq FA Cup final =

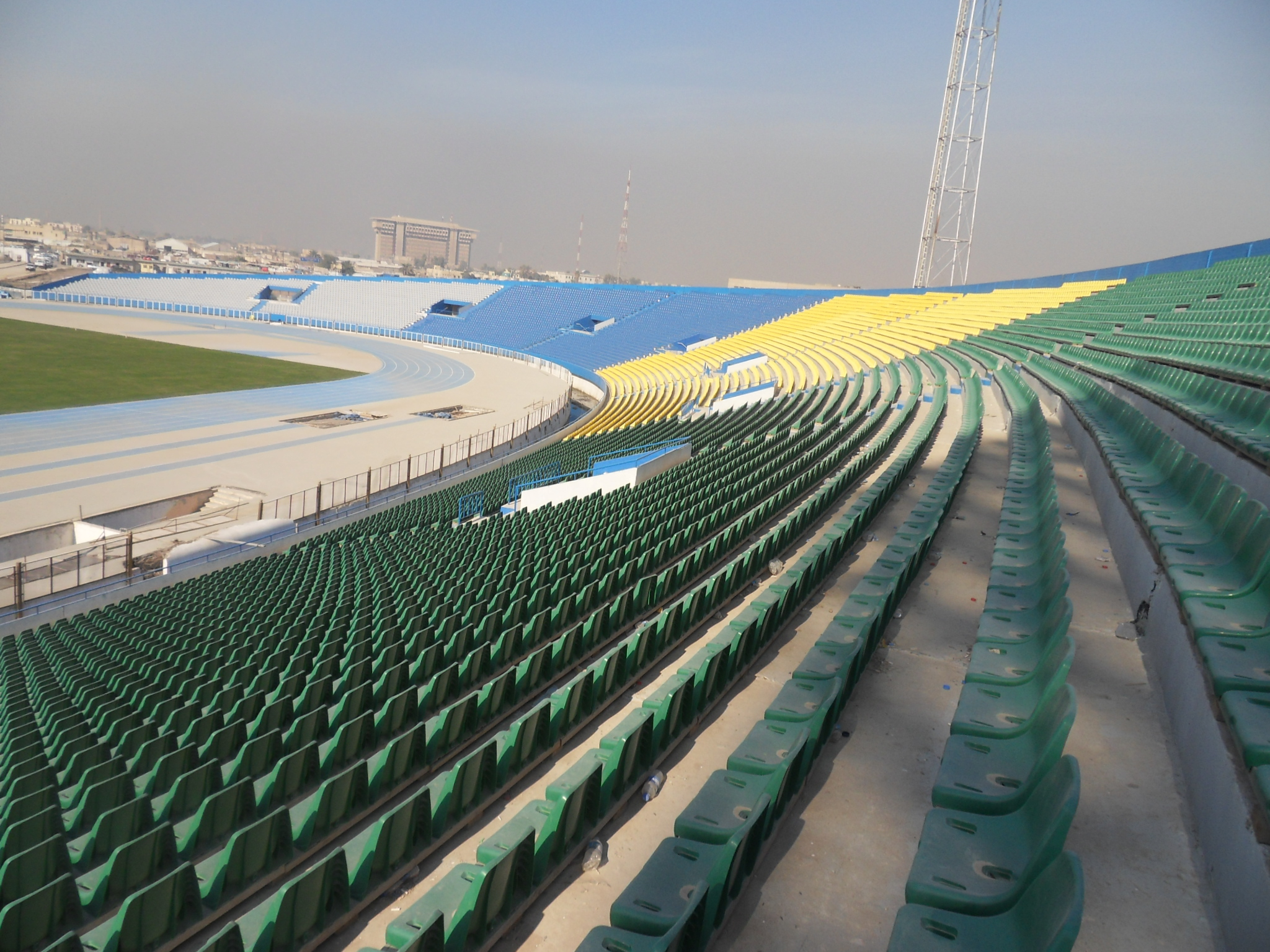
- The match took place at Al-Shaab Stadium
- Event: 2024–25 Iraq FA Cup
| Duhok | Zakho |
| 0 | 0 |
- After extra time Duhok won 5–3 on penalties
- Date: 18 July 2025
- Venue: Al-Shaab Stadium, Baghdad
- Man of the Match: Yannick Zakri (Duhok)
- Referee: Salman Falahi (Qatar)

The 2025 Iraq FA Cup final was the 32nd final of the Iraq FA Cup as a club competition. The match was contested between local rivals Duhok and Zakho, at Al-Shaab Stadium in Baghdad. It was played on 18 July 2025 to be the final match of the competition. Both teams were making their first appearance in the Iraq FA Cup final. It was the first time in the competition's history that both finalists were from outside Baghdad.

Duhok won the match 5–3 on penalties after a 0–0 draw to earn their first Iraq FA Cup title.

== Route to the Final ==
Note: In all results below, the score of the finalist is given first (H: home; A: away; N: neutral).

| Duhok | | Round | Zakho | |
|---|---|---|---|---|
| Opponent | Result | 2024–25 Iraq FA Cup | Opponent | Result |
| Maysan | 3–0 (H) | Round of 16 | Al-Karma | 2–0 (H) |
| Al-Minaa | 3–1 (H) | Quarter-finals | Newroz | 1–0 (H) |
| Al-Quwa Al-Jawiya | 3–1 (H) | Semi-finals | Al-Shorta | 0–0 (4–3 p.) (H) |

== Match ==
=== Details ===
18 July 2025
20:00 UTC+03:00

| Duhok | 0–0 (a.e.t.) | Zakho |
Penalties
| Ageed (penalty scored); Zakri (penalty scored); Ghazi (penalty scored); Younis (penalty scored); Darwich (penalty scored) | 5–3 | (penalty scored) Attwan; (penalty scored) Abu Hashish; (penalty missed) Abbood; (penalty scored) Haji Nori |

Al-Shaab Stadium, Baghdad
Referee: Salman Falahi (Qatar)

| Duhok | Zakho |

| GK | 95 | (Iraq) Mohammed Salih |
| RB | 27 | (Iraq) Bayar Abubakir |
| CB | 52 | (Brazil) Moisés Lucas |
| CB | 96 | (Brazil) Lucas Turci |
| LB | 99 | (Iraq) Siyaband Ageed | (yellow card) 45+3' |
| RM | 17 | (Iraq) Hassan Emad | (yellow card) 56' | (substituted off) 74' |
| CM | 5 | (Iraq) Ako Hzair | | (substituted off) 114' |
| CM | 10 | (Iraq) Haron Ahmed |
| LM | 80 | (Ivory Coast) Yannick Zakri (c) |
| CF | 28 | (Lebanon) Karim Darwich |
| CF | 11 | (Iraq) Pashang Abdulla | | (substituted off) 43' |
Substitutions:
| GK | 12 | (Iraq) Ahmed Bashar |
| GK | 33 | (Iraq) Zana Jawzal |
| DF | 2 | (Iraq) Najm Shwan |
| DF | 3 | (Iraq) Masies Artien |
| DF | 23 | (Iraq) Rebaz Raheem |
| MF | 6 | (Iraq) Mustafa Nawaf |
| FW | 18 | (Iraq) Dhulfiqar Younis | | (substituted on) 114' |
| FW | 29 | (Brazil) Marlon | | (substituted on) 43' |
| FW | 88 | (Iraq) Ibrahim Ghazi | | (substituted on) 74' |
Manager:
(Iraq) Sulaiman Ramadan

| GK | 12 | (Iraq) Ali Kadhim |
| RB | 17 | (Jordan) Yousef Al-Alousi | (yellow card) 61' |
| CB | 30 | (Iraq) Ahmad Ibrahim (c) |
| CB | 3 | (Brazil) Patrick Marcelino | (yellow card) 25' (yellow-red card) 65' |
| LB | 2 | (Jordan) Mohammad Abu Hashish |
| CM | 26 | (Nigeria) Aliyu Yau Adam | (yellow card) 40' |
| CM | 25 | (Iraq) Mohammed Ali Abbood |
| RM | 10 | (Syria) Mahmoud Al-Aswad | | (substituted off) 96' |
| AM | 99 | (Iraq) Ahmed Yasin | | (substituted off) 60' |
| LM | 7 | (Yemen) Nasser Al-Gahwashi | | (substituted off) 85' |
| CF | 35 | (Nigeria) Echeta Ugonna Deputy | | (substituted off) 114' |
Substitutions:
| GK | 1 | (Iraq) Omran Zaki |
| DF | 4 | (Iraq) Shivan Jameel |
| DF | 21 | (Iraq) Ramadan Sadiq | | (substituted on) 114' |
| DF | 32 | (Iraq) Alaa Raad | | (substituted on) 85' |
| MF | 14 | (Iraq) Amjad Attwan | (yellow card) (Note: Amjad Attwan received a yellow card during the penalty shootout.) | (substituted on) 60' |
| MF | 16 | (Iraq) Hady Saleh Karim |
| MF | 18 | (Iraq) Sidad Haji Nori | | (substituted on) 96' |
| MF | 19 | (Iraq) Hamid Haji |
| FW | 29 | (Brazil) Gustavo Henrique |
Manager:
(Iraq) Abdul-Ghani Shahad

Man of the Match:
Yannick Zakri (Duhok)

Assistant referees:
Ramzan Al-Nuaimi (Qatar)
Majed Al-Shammari (Qatar)
Fourth official:
Salem Amer (Iraq)
Video assistant referee:
Mishari Al-Shammari (Qatar)

Match rules

- 90 minutes.
- 30 minutes of extra time if necessary.
- Penalty shoot-out if scores still level.
- Nine named substitutes.
- Maximum of five substitutions, with a sixth allowed in extra time.
