= 1994–95 Iraq FA Cup =

Tournament details
- Country: Iraq

Final positions
- Champions: Al-Zawraa (10th title)
- Runners-up: Al-Jaish

Tournament statistics
- Top goal scorer(s): Sahib Abbas (7 goals)

The 1994–95 Iraq FA Cup was the 18th edition of the Iraq FA Cup as a club competition. The tournament was won by Al-Zawraa for the third consecutive time and the tenth time in their history, beating Al-Jaish 3–0 in the final. The previous rounds saw Al-Zawraa beat Samarra 3–1, Diyala 3–0, Al-Karkh 4–2, Al-Shorta 3–0 and Al-Ramadi on penalties in the semi-finals at Al-Shaab Stadium on 17 April 1995. Al-Jaish reached the final by beating Al-Quwa Al-Jawiya 1–0 on the same day at Al-Kashafa Stadium, while they also eliminated Al-Talaba in the first round of the competition. Al-Zawraa also won the 1994–95 Iraqi National League to complete their second double in a row.

== Matches ==
=== Final ===
28 April 1995

Al-Zawraa	3–0	Al-Jaish
Saddam; Abbas; Fawzi

Al-Shaab Stadium, Baghdad

Iraq FA Cup
1994–95 winner
Al-Zawraa
10th title
