= 1995–96 Iraq FA Cup =

Tournament details
- Country: Iraq
- Teams: 74

Final positions
- Champions: Al-Zawraa (11th title)
- Runners-up: Al-Shorta

The 1995–96 Iraq FA Cup was the 19th edition of the Iraq FA Cup as a club competition. The tournament was won by Al-Zawraa for the fourth consecutive time and the 11th time in their history, beating Al-Shorta 2–1 in the final. The previous rounds saw Al-Zawraa beat Al-Shuala 6–0, Salahaddin 6–0, Al-Sulaikh 4–1 and Al-Naft 1–0. Meanwhile, Al-Shorta had eliminated Al-Quwa Al-Jawiya in the semi-finals 4–2 on penalties after Al-Quwa Al-Jawiya had beaten Al-Ramadi 2–1 with a golden goal in the quarter-finals. Al-Zawraa also won the 1995–96 Iraqi Advanced League to complete their third double in a row.

== Matches ==
=== Semi-finals ===
Al-Zawraa	1–0	Al-Naft
Ali

Al-Shorta	1–1 (a.e.t.)	Al-Quwa Al-Jawiya
Jawad		Farhan
Penalties
	4–2

Al-Shaab Stadium, Baghdad

=== Final ===
28 April 1996

Al-Zawraa	2–1	Al-Shorta
Hamad (pen.)		Jawad

Al-Shaab Stadium, Baghdad

Iraq FA Cup
1995–96 winner
Al-Zawraa
11th title
