= Essam Hamad =

Iraqi football player and coach (born 1973)

Essam Hamad Salem
Personal information
- Date of birth: 22 October 1973 (age 53)
- Place of birth: Iraq
- Position: Midfielder

Senior career*
Years	Team	Apps	(Gls)
1991–1992	Al-Karkh		
- Al-Zawraa
1996–1997	Al-Taawun		
1997–2003	Al-Zawraa		
- Ahli Saida
- Tishreen
- Shabab Sahel
- Al-Yarmouk

International career
1995	Iraq U23		
1995–2000	Iraq	22	(5)

Managerial career
- 2010–2010: Al-Zawraa
- 2014–2015: Al-Karkh
- 2016: Zakho
- 2016–2017: Al-Zawraa
- 2018: Al-Talaba
- 2018–2021: Amanat Baghdad
- 2021: Al-Zawraa
- 2024–2025: Al-Zawraa
- * Club domestic league appearances and goals

Essam Hamad Salem (Arabic: عِصَام حَمَد سَالِم; born 22 October 1973) is an Iraqi football coach and former player.

He played as a midfielder for Iraq in the 2000 Asian Cup. Essam also played for Al-Karkh, Al-Taawun, and Al-Zawraa at club level.

== Club level ==
Hamad won the double (league and cup) twice, with Al-Zawraa in the 1994–95 and 1995–96 seasons.

== International career ==
Having already played for the Iraq Olympic team at the qualifiers for the 1996 Summer Olympics, Hamad began playing for the senior team in 1995. He was a regular at the 1996 AFC Asian Cup and 2000 AFC Asian Cup.

Hamad was selected to play for an Asian all-star team in 2000 by the AFC in Tehran, Iran, to commemorate the founding of the Islamic Republic of Iran. He captained the side in the second half. The all-star team was beaten 5–0 by Iran.

== Career statistics ==
=== International ===
Scores and results list Iraq's goal tally first.

#	Date	Venue	Opponent	Score	Result	Competition
1.	1 September 2000	Shanghai Stadium, Shanghai, China	Uzbekistan	1–0	2–0	Friendly match

=== Managerial ===
As of 27 February 2025

Team	Nat	From	To	Record				
Team	Nat	From	To	G	W	D	L	Win %
Al-Zawra'a	(Iraq)	29 March 2010	27 August 2010	27	17	4	6	62.96
Al-Karkh	(Iraq)	19 February 2014	20 October 2015	36	11	11	14	30.56
Zakho	(Iraq)	13 July 2016	1 October 2016	5	0	3	2	0.00
Al-Zawra'a	(Iraq)	3 November 2016	22 August 2017	44	27	12	5	61.36
Al-Talaba	(Iraq)	14 January 2018	29 March 2018	11	4	4	3	36.36
Amanat Baghdad	(Iraq)	28 December 2018	18 July 2021	122	40	44	38	32.8
Al-Zawraa	(Iraq)	20 August 2021	22 December 2021	16	12	2	2	75.00
Al-Zawraa	(Iraq)	2 April 2024	27 February 2025	41	26	9	6	63.41
Total				302	138	88	76	45.70

== Honours ==
=== Manager ===
Al-Zawraa

- Iraq FA Cup: 2017
- Iraqi Super Cup: 2021
