= 1995–96 Iraqi Advanced League =

Iraqi Advanced League
- Season: 1995–96
- Champions: Al-Zawraa (7th title)
- Relegated: Al-Jaish
- 1997–98 Asian Club Championship: Al-Zawraa
- 1997–98 Asian Cup Winners' Cup: Al-Shorta
- Top goalscorer: Hussam Fawzi; Ali Hassan (11 goals each)

The 1995–96 Iraqi Advanced League was the 22nd season of the competition since its foundation in 1974. The name of the league was changed from Iraqi National Clubs League to Iraqi Advanced League. The league title was won by Al-Zawraa for the third consecutive time. They also won the Iraq FA Cup for the fourth consecutive time, meaning they won three doubles in a row. In this season, a win was worth three points and the bonus point system from the previous season was removed.

== League table ==
Pos	Team	Pld	W	D	L	GF	GA	GD	Pts	Qualification or relegation
1	Al-Zawraa (C)	22	17	4	1	47	12	+35	55	1997–98 Asian Club Championship
2	Al-Najaf	22	10	8	4	21	12	+9	38	
3	Al-Shorta	22	11	4	7	26	17	+9	37	1997–98 Asian Cup Winners' Cup (Note: Al-Shorta qualified for the Cup Winners' Cup as runners-up of the Iraq FA Cup, won by Al-Zawraa.)
4	Al-Ramadi	22	9	7	6	28	24	+4	34	
5	Al-Naft	22	8	8	6	29	23	+6	32	
6	Al-Talaba	22	8	7	7	34	30	+4	31	
7	Al-Karkh	22	6	10	6	21	26	−5	28	
8	Al-Quwa Al-Jawiya	22	7	6	9	36	33	+3	27	
9	Al-Minaa	22	4	11	7	18	23	−5	23	
10	Samarra	22	6	5	11	21	35	−14	23	
11	Al-Sinaa	22	3	5	14	20	38	−18	14	
12	Al-Jaish (R)	22	2	7	13	10	38	−28	13	Relegation to the Iraqi First Division League

Source: Ali Al-Sabti Archive
(C) Champions; (R) Relegated

== Results ==
Home \ Away	JSH	KAR	MIN	NFT	NJF	QWJ	RAM	SHR	SIN	TLB	ZWR	SMR
Al-Jaish		0–0	0–0	0–1	0–0	0–3	1–0	0–1	0–0	3–1	0–3	2–2
Al-Karkh	1–1		0–0	1–0	0–0	3–0	1–1	2–2	4–2	1–1	1–1	1–0
Al-Minaa	2–0	1–1		2–2	0–0	2–0	3–1	2–0	0–0	0–0	0–1	0–0
Al-Naft	5–0	2–1	1–0		0–1	1–1	1–1	1–0	3–2	2–4	0–2	2–0
Al-Najaf	2–0	1–0	1–0	1–1		0–0	0–0	1–0	2–1	1–0	1–1	2–0
Al-Quwa Al-Jawiya	1–0	1–1	4–0	1–1	1–1		3–1	1–3	2–0	5–1	1–5	5–0
Al-Ramadi	2–0	1–0	3–1	1–1	2–1	2–1		1–0	0–1	1–1	0–2	3–1
Al-Shorta	1–1	5–0	3–1	2–0	1–0	1–0	0–2		0–0	1–0	1–0	2–0
Al-Sinaa	3–0	0–1	1–1	1–4	1–2	2–0	2–4	0–1		1–3	1–4	0–0
Al-Talaba	2–1	3–0	1–1	1–1	0–2	3–3	1–1	3–1	3–0		0–1	3–0
Al-Zawraa	5–0	3–0	1–1	1–0	3–2	3–2	2–0	0–0	2–1	3–0		2–0
Samarra	3–1	1–2	3–1	0–0	1–0	3–1	1–1	2–1	2–1	1–3	1–2	

Source: Ali Al-Sabti Archive
Legend: Blue = home team win; Yellow = draw; Red = away team win.

== Season statistics ==
=== Top scorers ===
Pos	Scorer	Goals	Team
1	Hussam Fawzi	11	Al-Zawraa
1	Ali Hassan	11	Al-Karkh
3	Ahmed Daham	9	Al-Quwa Al-Jawiya

=== Hat-tricks ===
Player	For	Against	Result	Date
(Iraq) Karim Saddam	Al-Sinaa	Al-Jaish	3–0	1 November 1995
(Iraq) Maad Ibrahim	Al-Naft	Al-Jaish	5–0	5 January 1996
(Iraq) Ahmed Daham	Al-Quwa Al-Jawiya	Al-Talaba	5–1	18 April 1996
