= Al-Numaniya SC =

Iraqi football club

- Full name: Al-Numaniya Sport Club
- Founded: 1970; 56 years ago
- Ground: Al-Numaniya Stadium
- Chairman: Ridha Abed Ali
- Manager: Salah Thamir Ibrahim
- League: Iraqi Third Division League
Home colours	Away colours

Al-Numaniya Sport Club (Arabic: نادي النعمانية الرياضي), is an Iraqi football team based in Al-Nu'maniya District, Wasit, that plays in the Iraqi Third Division League.

== History ==
=== in Premier League ===
Al-Numaniya played in the Iraqi Premier League for the first time in the 1988–89 season in the South Group, and were relegated to the Iraqi First Division League.

== Managerial history ==
- (Iraq) Abdul Hassan Hussein
- (Iraq) Ihsan Alaa
- (Iraq) Salah Thamir Ibrahim

== See also ==
- 2020–21 Iraq FA Cup
