= Al-Hilla SC =

Iraqi football club

- Full name: Al-Hilla Sport Club
- Founded: 1953; 73 years ago
- Ground: Al Hilla Stadium
- Capacity: 3,000
- Chairman: Hussein Al-Amidi
- Manager: Attiya Yousef
- League: Iraqi Third Division League
Home colours	Away colours

Al-Hilla Sport Club (Arabic: نادي الحلة الرياضي), is an Iraqi football team based in Al-Hilla, Babil, that plays in Iraqi Third Division League.

== History ==
Al-Hilla Sports Club was established in 1953, the team played for the first time in the Iraqi Premier League at the 1975–76 season, the team ended their first season in tenth place and was able to continue playing in the league, and their results were not good, as it won five matches, drawing seven, and lost 12. The team played their second season, the 1976–77 season, in the league very badly and their results were disastrous, as it could not win any match, drawing three and lost all other matches, and finished in last place at the end of the season, but they were fortunate because that the Football Association decided not to relegate any club, which allowed the team to play a third season in the league. The third season, the 1977–78 season, did not bring anything new, as the team continued its poor results, winning one match, drawing two and losing all their other matches, and relegated to the Iraqi First Division League.

== Other sports ==
=== Basketball ===
- Iraqi Basketball Premier League:
  - Champions (3): 2002–03, 2003–04, 2006–07

== See also ==
- 1999–2000 Iraq FA Cup
