= Thamer Yousif =

Iraqi Assyrian footballer

Personal information
- Full name: Elias Thamir Assoufi
- Date of birth: July 1, 1953 (age 73)
- Place of birth: Iraq
- Position: Forward

Senior career*
Years	Team	Apps	(Gls)
1970–1987	Al Zawra		

International career
1973–1980	Iraq	37	
- * Club domestic league appearances and goals

Elias Thamir Yousif (Arabic: تامر يوسف) (born 1 July 1953) was an Assyrian football player. A long time Al Zawra member, Thamir led the Iraq Super League in goals on three occasions (1975, 1976, 1982) and was 2nd in the league on two occasions. His domestic club career lasted from 1970 to 1987. He led his team, Al Zawraa, to three national titles (1976, 1977, 1979). He was part of the dangerous offensive trio of Al Zawra during the 1970s that included Ali Kadhim and the Falah Hassan.

He started his football career in 1970 for Al-Sikak Al-Hadeed. Thamir was first selected for the national team at the age of 20 in 1973. His accomplishments on the domestic scene includes 3 league and 4 cup titles with the Al-Zawraa, whom he played for 17 years. He made 37 appearances for the Iraqi national team and scored over 150 goals in his career before retiring in 1987. Thamir was leading scorer in the Iraqi league in three seasons, the first in 75, where he scored 12 goals, the next year he scored 13 goals to lead Al-Zawraa to the league title and the 3rd in 1982 he scored 11 goals.

Thamir had great success on the national stage. The Iraqi national team was one of the best in the 1970s, where Thamer and teammates won the 1972 and 1974 Pan Arab Cup, 1979 Gulf Cup, 1977 and 1979 World Military Cup. He was chosen part of the Iraqi olympic team in the 1980 Olympics, where the team passed the first round, but lost to East Germany in the quarterfinals.
