= Al-Amara SC =

Iraqi football club

- Full name: Al-Amara Sport Club
- Founded: 1956; 69 years ago
- Ground: Al-Amara Stadium
- Chairman: Ali Abdul-Aiyemmah
- Manager: Hamed Karim
- League: Iraqi Third Division League
Home colours	Away colours

Al-Amara Sport Club (Arabic: نادي العمارة الرياضي) is an Iraqi football team based in Al-Amarah, Maysan, that plays in Iraqi Third Division League.

== History ==
=== In Premier League ===
Al-Amara team played in the Iraqi Premier League for the first time in the 1988–89 season in the South Group, the club's name was Al-Hurriya at that time, and the team was not good enough, and eventually relegated to the Iraqi First Division League.

In the 1993–94 season, the team returned to play in the Iraqi Premier League, and at that time the name of the club was changed to Al-Amara, the team ended their season in twenty-first place and was able to continue playing in the league, and their results were not good, as it won 10 matches, drawing 16, and lost 24. The following season, the 1994–95 season, the team did not bring anything new, as the team continued its poor results, winning 10 match, drawing 11 and losing all their other matches, and relegated to the Iraqi First Division League.

== Managerial history ==
- (Iraq) Saad Hamil
- (Iraq) Hamed Karim
