= Al-Kufa SC =

Iraqi football club

Al-Kufa FC
- Full name: Al-Kufa Sports Club
- Founded: 1964; 62 years ago
- Ground: An-Najaf Stadium
- Capacity: 12,000
- Chairman: Najeh Humoud
- Manager: Maitham Jaber
- League: Iraqi First Division League
| Home colours | Away colours |

Al-Kufa Sports Club (Arabic: نادي الكوفة الرياضي), is an Iraqi football club based in Kufa, Najaf Governorate. The club competes in the Iraqi First Division League. It was founded in 1964.

== Managerial history ==
- (Iraq) Adel Ali Al-Aasam
- (Iraq) Salman Hussein
- (Iraq) Maitham Jaber

== See also ==
- 2019–20 Iraq FA Cup
- 2021–22 Iraq FA Cup
- 2022–23 Iraq FA Cup
