= Al-Umal SC =

Iraqi football club

- Full name: Al-Umal Sport Club
- Founded: 1978; 48 years ago
- Ground: Al-Umal Stadium
- Chairman: Sattar Danbous Barrak
- Manager: Walid Obaid
- League: Iraqi Third Division League
Home colours	Away colours

Al-Umal Sport Club (Arabic: نادي العمال الرياضي), is an Iraqi football team based in Al-Iskan District, Baghdad, that plays in the Iraqi Third Division League.

== History ==
=== Premier League Play Overview ===
Al-Umal was promoted to the Iraqi Premier League in first time in 1992–93 season, by a decision of the Iraq Football Association to replace Al-Tijara, which was excluded, after 46 games, adopting Al-Tijara's record at that point which was 10 wins, 18 draws, 18 losses, 39 goals scored, 55 goals conceded, 38 points. In the end, the team managed to finish the league in 18th place out of 24 teams, after gaining 59 points. In total, the team played in the Premier League for only three seasons, as it was relegated to the Iraqi First Division League at the end of the 1994–95 season.

== Managerial history ==
- (Iraq) Saadoun Rashid Jabur
- (Iraq) Shaker Salem
- (Iraq) Ali Hussein Yassin
- (Iraq) Karim Qumbel

== Famous players ==
- (Iraq) Nadhim Shaker

== See also ==
- 1991–92 Iraq FA Cup
- 2020–21 Iraq FA Cup
