= Al-Thawra SC =

Iraqi football club

- Full name: Al-Thawra Sport Club
- Founded: 1955; 71 years ago, as Al-Faisaly
- Ground: Al-Thawra Stadium
- Chairman: Fadhel Aswad
- Manager: Taha Qasim
- League: Iraqi Third Division League
Home colours	Away colours

Al-Thawra Sport Club (Arabic: نادي الثورة الرياضي) is an Iraqi football team based in Kirkuk, that plays in Iraqi Third Division League.

== History ==
=== Early years ===
Al-Thawra club was founded in 1955 under the name Al-Faisaly Club in relation to King Faisal II, and after the 14 July Revolution, 1958, the club’s name was changed to Al-Thawra, meaning: The Revolution.

=== In Premier League ===
Al-Thawra team played in the Iraqi Premier League for the first time in the 1977–78 season, the team ended their first season in twelfth place and was able to continue playing in the league, and their results were not good, as it won three matches, drawing three, and lost seven. The team played their second season, the 1978–79 season, did not bring anything new, as the team continued its poor results, winning one match, drawing one and losing all their other matches, and the Football Association punished the team because of its fans' assault on the referee and assistant referees in its match against Al-Sinaa, and it was considered relegated to the Iraqi First Division League before completing the league with four rounds remaining.

== Managerial history ==
- (Iraq) Mohammed Balla
- (Iraq) Emad Qadir
- (Iraq) Mohammed Hadi Jassim
- (Iraq) Sabah Ghani
- (Iraq) Taha Qasim

== Famous players ==
- (Iraq) Sherko Karim
