= Sulaymaniya SC =

Iraqi football club

Sulaymaniya
- Full name: Sulaymaniya Sport Club
- Nickname: Mother’s club Surposhakan (Reds)
- Founded: 1956; 70 years ago
- Ground: Sulaymaniyah Stadium
- Capacity: 12,000
- Chairman: Qubad Talabani
- League: Iraqi Second Division League
Home colours	Away colours

Sulaymaniya Sport club also written (Arabic: نادي السليمانية, Kurdish: یانه‌ی وه‌رزشی سلێمانی) is a sports club based in Sulaymaniyah, Kurdistan Region, Iraq. It is the oldest sports club in sulaymaniyah.

== Club honours ==
- Iraqi Premier Division League
  - Champions (1): 2011–12

== Individual honours ==
2009 FIFA Confederations Cup

The following players have played in the FIFA Confederations Cup whilst playing for Sulaymaniya :
- (Iraq) 2009 – Dara Mohammed
- (Iraq) 2009 – Halgurd Mulla Mohammed
