= Babil SC =

Iraqi football club

- Full name: Babil Sport Club
- Nickname(s): Lions of Babylon, Sons of civilisation
- Founded: 1960; 65 years ago
- Ground: Babil Stadium
- Chairman: Haider Al-Mulla
- Manager: Jassim Jabor
- League: Iraqi Third Division League
Home colours	Away colours

Babil Sports Club (Arabic: نادي بابل الرياضي), or Babylon Sports Club, is an Iraqi football club based in Babil, that plays in Iraqi Third Division League.

== History ==
Babil Sport Club was founded in 1960. The team has played in the Iraqi Premier League since the start of the tournament in 1974, and They had played for four seasons, and in all of them it had been struggling to stay away from relegation. In the end, they were relegated to the Iraqi First Division League in the 1978 season. The team returned after eleven seasons, but was quickly relegated at the end of the season again.

In the 1993–94 season, originally, the Iraq Youth Team participated in the league. Their record was 25 games, 8 wins, 8 draws, 9 losses, 33 goals scored, 29 goals conceded and 24 points. At the halfway stage of the season, they were replaced by Babil, and Babil adopted the Youth Team's record at that point. In the end, Babil finished before last and survived from relegation, but finally relegated the following season. After ten seasons, Babil made a comeback in the league in 2004–05 season, but, as usual, they were relegated at the end of the season.

== Crest ==
In September 2020, Babil SC announced its new logo through its media office, marking a new era for Babylonian football, which has a long history of active participation in the Iraqi Premier League. The announcement of the club’s new logo, which symbolizes the city's historical civilization, coincides with their preparations for the Iraqi First Division League that qualifies for the Premier League.

== Managerial history ==
- (Iraq) Kadhim Mutashar
- (Iraq) Thair Ahmed
- (Iraq) Maitham Dael-Haq
- (Iraq) Haider Al-Mulla
- (Iraq) Ali Wahab
- (Iraq) Fouad Jawad
- (Iraq) Hazem Saleh
- (Iraq) Jassim Jabor

== Famous players ==
- Razzaq Farhan

== See also ==
- 2021–22 Iraq FA Cup
