= Al-Sulaikh SC =

Iraqi football club

- Full name: Al-Sulaikh Sport Club
- Founded: 1957; 69 years ago
- Ground: Al-Sulaikh Stadium
- Chairman: Alaa Gatea
- Manager: Shaker Abed Ali
- League: Iraqi Second Division League
Home colours	Away colours

Al-Sulaikh SC (Arabic: نادي الصليخ الرياضي) is an Iraqi football team based in Baghdad, that plays in Iraqi Second Division League.

== History ==
=== Early years ===
Al-Sulaikh Sports Club was founded in 1957 in Baghdad.

=== Al-Hawat ===
In 1974, Al-Sulaikh merged with a club named Al-Hawat. Al-Hawat had previously participated in the Iraq FA Baghdad First Division in the 1949–50 season.

=== In Premier League ===
Al-Sulaikh played in the Iraqi Premier League in 2005–06 season, but relegated to the Iraqi First Division League after finished the season in 7th place in the Group Stage.

== Honours ==
- Iraqi Premier Division League (second tier)
  - Winners: 1995–96

== Managerial history ==
- (Iraq) Khudhair Abbas
- (Iraq) Ali Wahab
- (Iraq) Karim Farhan
- (Iraq) Rashid Sultan
- (Iraq) Hazim Saleh
- (Iraq) Muthana Khalid
- (Iraq) Shaker Abed Ali

== Famous players ==
- Mahdi Karim
- Mustafa Karim
- Essam Yassin

== See also ==
- 2002–03 Iraq FA Cup
- 2015–16 Iraq FA Cup
- 2022–23 Iraq FA Cup
