= Al-Mosul SC =

Iraqi football club

Mosul SC
- Full name: Mosul Sports Club
- Founded: 1947; 79 years ago, as Al-Ahly
- Ground: University of Mosul Stadium
- Capacity: 5,000
- President: Raaed Mohammed
- Head coach: Haitham Al-Shboul
- League: Iraq Stars League
- 2025–26: Iraq Stars League, 13th of 20
Home colours	Away colours

Mosul Sports Club (Arabic: نادي الموصل) is an Iraqi professional football club based in Mosul, that plays in the Iraq Stars League.

== History ==
In the Iraqi Premier League 2007–08 season, Al-Mosul FC withdrew for security reasons. Hence they came back to the Iraqi Premier League without playing in the lower division. In the Iraqi Premier League 2008–09 season, the club announced their withdrawal, this time due to financial problems.

== Honours ==
- Iraqi Premier Division League (second tier)
  - Winners (3): 1981–82, 2001–02, 2024–25 (shared record)
- Iraqi First Division League (third tier)
  - Winners: 2023–24
