= Al-Shabab SC (Iraq) =

Iraqi football club

- Full name: Al-Shabab Sports Club
- Founded: 1951; 75 years ago
- Ground: Baghdad Stadium
- League: Iraqi Third Division League
Home colours	Away colours

Al-Shabab Sports Club (Youth SC, Arabic: نادي الشباب الرياضي) is an Iraqi football club that is based in Baghdad. It currently plays in the Iraqi Third Division League. Its home colours are a shirt with blue and black Inter Milan style stripes with black shorts and blue socks and its away colors are a white shirt with blue shoulders and blue on the sides with blue shorts and white socks.

== Honours ==
=== Domestic ===
- Iraqi Premier Division League (second tier)
  - Winners (1): 1977–78
- Iraq FA Cup
  - Runners-up (3): 1982–83, 1983–84, 1989–90

=== International ===
- Arab Club Champions Cup
  - Third place (1): 1988

=== Friendly ===
- Stafford Challenge Cup
  - Winners (1): 1980

== Famous players ==
- (Iraq) Falah Hassan
- (Iraq) Basil Gorgis
