= Al-Nasiriya SC =

Iraqi association football club

- Full name: Al-Nasiriya Sport Club
- Nickname: Sons of Sumer (احفاد سومر)
- Founded: 1961; 65 years ago
- Ground: Al-Nasiriya International Stadium
- Capacity: 20,000
- Chairman: Ihsan Ali Al-Ezairjaoui
- Manager: Thair Jassam
- League: Iraqi Premier Division League
- 2025–26: Iraqi Premier Division League, 7th of 20
Home colours	Away colours

Al-Nasiriya Sports Club (Arabic: الناصرية), often simply known as Al-Nasiriya SC, is an Iraqi professional football club based in An Nasiriyah, Dhi Qar Governorate. Founded on 21 October 1961, the club competes in the Iraqi Premier Division League. Al-Nasiriya SC is nicknamed Sons of Sumer (Arabic: احفاد سومر).

The Al-Nasiriya International Stadium is where Al-Nasiriya SC play their home games. It is a multi-use stadium in An Nasiriyah, Iraq and has a maximum capacity of around 20,000.

== Current squad ==
=== First-team squad ===
As of 30 May 2024

Note: Flags indicate national team as defined under FIFA eligibility rules; some limited exceptions apply. Players may hold more than one non-FIFA nationality.

No.	Pos.	Nation	Player
2	DF	IRQ	Jaafer Sadiq
3	DF	IRQ	Abbas Manie
10	FW	IRQ	Hassan Abdul-Amir
15	DF	IRQ	Hayder Mohammed
20	DF	IRQ	Ibrahim Abdul-Kareem
24	MF	IRQ	Abbas Fawzi
25	MF	IRQ	Sajid Abbas

No.	Pos.	Nation	Player
33	GK	IRQ	Ali Rasheed
35	DF	IRQ	Firas Zamel
40	GK	IRQ	Mustafa Adhab
44	MF	IRQ	David Herman
55	FW	IRQ	Ali Nabeel
66	DF	IRQ	Murtadha Raees
88	FW	IRQ	Koulibali Oulu

== Managerial history ==
- (Iraq) Ahmed Daham
- (Iraq) Murtadha Ali
- (Iraq) Ali Jawad
- (Iraq) Ali Wahaib
- (Iraq) Dhiaa Abdul-Nabi
- (Iraq) Mubarak Matar
- (Iraq) Mohsin Abdul-Nabi
- (Iraq) Aqeel Mohammed
- (Iraq) Thair Jassam
