= Al-Tijara SC =

Association football club in Iraq

Al-Tijara
- Full name: Al-Tijara sport club
- Nicknames: Qahir Al-Kibar (Conqueror of Giants)
- Founded: 1974; 52 years ago (as Al-Iktisad)
- Ground: Al-Tijara Stadium
- Chairman: Mohammed Hanoon Karim
- Manager: Dhiab Nuhair
- League: Iraqi Second Division League
- 2024–25: Iraqi Second Division League, 4th of 20
Home colours	Away colours

Al-Tijara Sport Club (Trade SC, Arabic: نادي التجارة الرياضي ) is an Iraqi professional football club based in Baghdad, that competes in the Iraqi Second Division League.

== History ==
=== In Premier League ===
Al-Tijara was founded in 1974 as Al-Iktisad as an amalgamation of Ministry of Trade teams, the most prominent of which were the Orosdi-Back team and the Al-Asha team. Al-Iktisad gained promotion to the Iraqi Premier League in 1975 and registered officially as a sports club. The team played fifteen seasons in the Iraqi Premier League until 1992, first three seasons (1975–78) from those, played in their old name Al-Iktisad.

=== Suspension and resumption ===
In 2014, sports activities were suspended in the club, and after four years, in 2018, activities resumed and new teams were established in various sports, including the football team, which recently qualified to play in the Iraqi First Division League.

== Managerial history ==
- (Iraq) Ammo Baba
- (Iraq) Hassan Ahmed
- (Iraq) Abdul Karim Jassim
- (Iraq) Thiab Nuhair

== Famous players ==
- (Iraq) Mahdi Abdul-Sahib
- (Iraq) Maad Ibrahim
- (Iraq) Hassan Ahmed

== See also ==
- 1990–91 Iraq FA Cup
- 1991–92 Iraq FA Cup
- 1992–93 Iraq FA Cup
