= 10th Umm al-Ma'arik Championship =

Umm al-Ma'arik Championship
Tournament details
- Country: Iraq
- Dates: 3–15 December 2000
- Teams: 8

Final positions
- Champions: Al-Shorta
- Runners-up: Al-Zawraa
- Third place: Al-Karkh
- Fourth place: Al-Talaba

Tournament statistics
- Matches played: 16
- Goals scored: 50 (3.13 per match)
- Top goal scorer(s): Ahmed Khudhair; Mahir Ogla; Sabah Jeayer (3 goals each)

Awards
- Best player: Ammar Abdul-Hussein

The 10th Umm al-Ma'arik Championship (Arabic: بطولة أم المعارك العاشرة) was the tenth occurrence of the Baghdad Championship. The competition was organised by the Iraq Football Association and the top eight teams of the 1999–2000 Iraqi First Division League competed in the tournament. The competition started on 3 December 2000 and ended on 15 December 2000 where, in the final, held at Al-Shaab Stadium, Al-Shorta defeated Al-Zawraa 1–0. Al-Karkh midfielder Ammar Abdul-Hussein was the player of the tournament.

== Group stage ==
=== Group 1 ===
Team	Pld	W	D	L	GF	GA	GD	Pts
Al-Zawraa	3	3	0	0	11	2	+9	9
Al-Shorta	3	2	0	1	12	5	+7	6
Duhok	3	1	0	2	2	6	−4	3
Salahaddin	3	0	0	3	1	13	−12	0

3 December 2000

Al-Zawraa	3–2	Al-Shorta
Rahim; E. Mohammed; H. Mohammed		Ridha; A. Khudhair (pen.)

Al-Shaab Stadium
Referee: Sabah Qasim
3 December 2000

Duhok	1–0	Salahaddin
J. Mohammed

Al-Shorta Stadium
Referee: Mahdi Faleeh
5 December 2000

Al-Shorta	7–1	Salahaddin
Ogla; Mnajed; Hadi; A. Khudhair; Akram; Rubui		S. Mohammed

Al-Karkh Stadium
Referee: Hazim Hussein
5 December 2000

Al-Zawraa	3–0	Duhok
H. Mohammed; Rahim; Hussein (pen.)

Al-Shorta Stadium
Referee: Alaa Abdul-Qadir
7 December 2000

Al-Shorta	3–1	Duhok
A. Khudhair; Ogla; Mnajed		Abdul-Amir

Al-Zawraa Stadium
Referee: Shaker Mahmoud
7 December 2000

Al-Zawraa	5–0	Salahaddin
Ahmad; Sattar; Fawzi

Al-Karkh Stadium

=== Group 2 ===
Team	Pld	W	D	L	GF	GA	GD	Pts
Al-Talaba	3	2	0	1	6	2	+4	6
Al-Karkh	3	2	0	1	3	2	+1	6
Al-Minaa	3	2	0	1	3	4	−1	6
Al-Quwa Al-Jawiya	3	0	0	3	3	7	−4	0

4 December 2000

Al-Talaba	3–1	Al-Quwa Al-Jawiya
Saadoun; Abbas; Jeayer		H. Kadhim; Saadoun (penalty missed)

Al-Shaab Stadium
Referee: Najim Aboud
4 December 2000

Al-Minaa	1–0	Al-Karkh
Chathir

Al-Shorta Stadium
Referee: Abdul-Aal Khudhair
6 December 2000

Al-Talaba	3–0	Al-Minaa
Abbas; H. Abdul-Razzaq; Ibrahim

Al-Karkh Stadium
Referee: Mohammed Sahib
6 December 2000

Al-Karkh	2–1	Al-Quwa Al-Jawiya
A. Abdul-Hussein; Hassan		J. Khudhair

Al-Shorta Stadium
Referee: Mahmoud Nouraddin
8 December 2000

Al-Karkh	1–0	Al-Talaba
Mattab

Al-Shorta Stadium
Referee: Sabah Qasim
8 December 2000

Al-Minaa	2–1	Al-Quwa Al-Jawiya
A. Abdul-Razzaq; Salman		Karim

Al-Karkh Stadium
Referee: Hazim Hussein

== Semifinals ==
11 December 2000

Al-Zawraa	2–1 (a.e.t.)	Al-Karkh
Hamad; A. Kadhim		T. Abdul-Hussein

Al-Shaab Stadium
Referee: Mahmoud Nouraddin
12 December 2000

Al-Shorta	1–1 (a.e.t.)	Al-Talaba
Yousif		Jeayer
Penalties
U. Mohammed (penalty scored); Akram (penalty scored); Hadi (penalty scored); Khalaf (penalty scored)	4–2	(penalty scored) Jafar; (penalty scored) Turki; (penalty missed) Abbas; (penalty missed) Jeayer

Al-Shaab Stadium

== Third place match ==
14 December 2000

Al-Karkh	2–1	Al-Talaba
A. Abdul-Hussein; Mattar		Jeayer

Al-Shaab Stadium
Referee: Mohammed Sahib

== Final ==
15 December 2000

Al-Shorta	1–0	Al-Zawraa
Mushraf 42'	Report	(red card) 90'

Al-Shaab Stadium
Attendance: 50,000
Referee: Hazim Hussein

Al-Shorta
Al-Zawraa

GK	(Iraq) Ahmed Ali Hussein
DF	(Iraq) Mazin Abdul-Sattar
DF	(Iraq) Mahir Habib
DF	(Iraq) Munaim Yousif
DF	(Iraq) Rahim Raboui	Substituted off
MF	(Iraq) Mahir Ogla (c)
MF	(Iraq) Mohammed Hadi
MF	(Iraq) Mudhahar Khalaf	Substituted off
FW	(Iraq) Amer Mushraf
FW	(Iraq) Ahmed Khudhair	Substituted off
FW	(Iraq) Hashim Ridha
Substitutions:
DF	(Iraq) Waleed Khalid	Substituted in
DF	(Iraq) Ziyad Tariq	Substituted in
MF	(Iraq) Nashat Akram	Substituted in
Manager:
(Iraq) Ahmed Radhi

GK	(Iraq) Ahmed Ali Jaber
DF	(Iraq) Haider Obeid
DF	(Iraq) Ghaith Abdul-Ghani
DF	(Iraq) Ahmad Kadhim
MF	(Iraq) Adnan Mohammad	Substituted off
MF	(Iraq) Mohannad Nassir
MF	(Iraq) Essam Hamad (c)
MF	(Iraq) Ahmad Abdul-Jabar
MF	(Iraq) Abbas Rahim
FW	(Iraq) Emad Mohammed	Substituted off
FW	(Iraq) Husham Mohammed	Substituted off
Substitutions:
MF	(Iraq) Laith Hussein	Substituted in
FW	(Iraq) Ammar Ahmed	Substituted in
FW	(Iraq) Hussam Fawzi	Substituted in
Manager:
(Iraq) Adnan Hamad

Match rules

- 90 minutes.
- 30 minutes of golden goal extra time if necessary.
- Penalty shoot-out if scores still level.
- Seven named substitutes, of which up to three may be used.

Umm al-Ma'arik Championship
2000–01 winner
Al-Shorta
1st title
