= 9th Umm al-Ma'arik Championship =

Umm al-Ma'arik Championship
Tournament details
- Country: Iraq
- Teams: 8

Final positions
- Champions: Al-Zawraa
- Runner-up: Al-Quwa Al-Jawiya
- Third place: Al-Karkh
- Fourth place: Al-Talaba

Tournament statistics
- Top goal scorer(s): Qahtan Chathir (6 goals)

The 9th Umm al-Ma'arik Championship (Arabic: بطولة أم المعارك التاسعة) was the ninth occurrence of the Baghdad Championship, organised by the Iraq Football Association. The top eight teams of the 1998–99 Iraqi Premier League competed in the tournament. In the final, held at Al-Shaab Stadium, Al-Zawraa defeated Al-Quwa Al-Jawiya 2–0.

== Group stage ==
=== Group 1 ===
Team	Pld	W	D	L	GF	GA	GD	Pts
Al-Quwa Al-Jawiya	3	2	0	1	5	3	+2	6
Al-Zawraa	3	2	0	1	5	3	+2	6
Diyala	3	2	0	1	5	5	0	6
Al-Shorta	3	0	0	3	3	7	−4	0

Notes

1. Al-Quwa Al-Jawiya finished ahead of Al-Zawraa due to head-to-head record.

Al-Zawraa	2–1	Al-Shorta
Mohammed		Ridha

Al-Quwa Al-Jawiya	1–2	Diyala

Diyala	0–2	Al-Zawraa
		Ahmad; Nassir

Al-Shorta	0–2	Al-Quwa Al-Jawiya
		Dhahid

Al-Shorta	2–3	Diyala

Al-Quwa Al-Jawiya	2–1	Al-Zawraa
Salih; Saddam		Karim

=== Group 2 ===
Team	Pld	W	D	L	GF	GA	GD	Pts
Al-Talaba	3	3	0	0	7	4	+3	9
Al-Karkh	3	2	0	1	7	3	+4	6
Al-Minaa	3	0	1	2	1	4	−3	1
Al-Najaf	3	0	1	2	1	5	−4	1

Al-Talaba	3–2	Al-Karkh

Al-Minaa	0–0	Al-Najaf

Al-Talaba	2–1	Al-Najaf

Al-Minaa	0–2	Al-Karkh

Al-Karkh	3–0	Al-Najaf

Al-Talaba	2–1	Al-Minaa

== Semifinals ==
Al-Quwa Al-Jawiya	2–2 (a.e.t.)	Al-Karkh
Penalties
	4–1

Al-Zawraa	4–2	Al-Talaba
Hamad (pen.) (pen.); Abdul-Latif

== Third place match ==
Al-Karkh	3–0	Al-Talaba

== Final ==
Al-Zawraa	2–0	Al-Quwa Al-Jawiya
Abdul-Jabar; Rahim

Al-Shaab Stadium, Baghdad

Umm al-Ma'arik Championship
1999–2000 winner
Al-Zawraa
2nd title
