= 12th Umm al-Ma'arik Championship =

Umm al-Ma'arik Championship
Tournament details
- Country: Iraq
- Dates: 9–20 August 2002
- Teams: 8

Final positions
- Champions: Al-Shorta
- Runners-up: Al-Talaba
- Third place: Al-Zawraa
- Fourth place: Al-Quwa Al-Jawiya

Tournament statistics
- Top goal scorer(s): Husham Mohammed (4 goals)

Awards
- Best player: Ahmed Salah

The 12th Umm al-Ma'arik Championship (Arabic: بطولة أم المعارك الثانية عشرة) was the twelfth occurrence of the Baghdad Championship. The competition was organised by the Iraq Football Association and the top eight teams of the 2001–02 Iraqi Elite League competed in the tournament. The competition started on 9 August 2002 and ended on 20 August 2002, where in the final, held at Al-Shaab Stadium, Al-Shorta defeated Al-Talaba 1–0 to win the cup for the third time in a row.

== Group stage ==
=== Group 1 ===
Team	Pld	W	D	L	GF	GA	GD	Pts
Al-Talaba	3	3	0	0	6	1	+5	9
Al-Shorta	3	2	0	1	5	4	+1	6
Al-Najaf	3	1	0	2	4	4	0	3
Duhok	3	0	0	3	2	8	−6	0

9 August 2002

Al-Shorta	2–0	Al-Najaf
T. Abdul-Hussein 7'; Ahmad 63' (pen.)

Al-Shaab Stadium, Baghdad
9 August 2002

Al-Talaba	2–0	Duhok
Nayrouz 5'; Karim 71'

Al-Shaab Stadium, Baghdad
11 August 2002

Duhok	0–3	Al-Najaf
		Sadir 55'; Hussein 71'; Najim 83'

Al-Shaab Stadium, Baghdad
11 August 2002

Al-Talaba	2–0	Al-Shorta
A. Salah 20', 38'

Al-Shaab Stadium, Baghdad
13 August 2002

Al-Talaba	2–1	Al-Najaf
Ameen 25'; Karim 44'		Sadir 42'

Al-Shorta Stadium, Baghdad
13 August 2002

Al-Shorta	3–2	Duhok
Ridha 14', (penalty missed); Habib 45'; Ahmad 69'		U. Mohammed (o.g.); Idan 61'

Al-Shaab Stadium, Baghdad

=== Group 2 ===
Team	Pld	W	D	L	GF	GA	GD	Pts
Al-Zawraa	3	3	0	0	9	4	+5	9
Al-Quwa Al-Jawiya	3	1	1	1	6	4	+2	4
Erbil	3	1	0	2	4	8	−4	3
Al-Karkh	3	0	1	2	5	8	−3	1

10 August 2002

Al-Quwa Al-Jawiya	2–2	Al-Karkh
Ali 61'; Dhahid 80'		R. Abdul-Hussein 37'; Mutaab

Al-Shaab Stadium, Baghdad
10 August 2002

Al-Zawraa	4–1	Erbil
H. Mohammed 20', 45', (penalty missed) 31'; Tallaa 52'; Sattar 76'		Jawad 78'

Al-Shaab Stadium, Baghdad
12 August 2002

Al-Karkh	1–3	Erbil
Mutaab		Nassir 35', 45'; Jawad 42'

Al-Shaab Stadium, Baghdad
12 August 2002

Al-Quwa Al-Jawiya	1–2	Al-Zawraa
Shenaishil 5'		Fawzi 53'; H. Mohammed 83'

Al-Shaab Stadium, Baghdad
14 August 2002

Al-Quwa Al-Jawiya	3–0	Erbil
Khudhair 50' (pen.); Shenaishil 89' (pen.); Marzook 90+4'

Al-Shorta Stadium, Baghdad
14 August 2002

Al-Zawraa	3–2	Al-Karkh
L. Salah 9'; Ijwad 49'; Sabah 60'		R. Abdul-Hussein 26'; Khamis 34'

Al-Shaab Stadium, Baghdad

== Semifinals ==
16 August 2002

Al-Zawraa	0–0 (a.e.t.)	Al-Shorta
		Hameed (red card)
Penalties
Fawzi (penalty scored); Tallaa (penalty missed); Sattar (penalty missed); Jamal (penalty missed); H. Mohammed (penalty scored)	2–3	(penalty missed) Ogla; (penalty scored) Ridha; (penalty scored) Habib; (penalty missed) Mohammed Ali; (penalty scored) A. Abdul-Hussein

Al-Shaab Stadium, Baghdad
Referee: Alaa Abdul-Qadir
17 August 2002

Al-Talaba	2–0	Al-Quwa Al-Jawiya
Abdul-Razzaq 6'; Karim 75'

Al-Shaab Stadium, Baghdad
Referee: Mahmoud Nouraddin

== Third place match ==
19 August 2002

Al-Zawraa	2–1	Al-Quwa Al-Jawiya
H. Mohammed 21'; H. Kadhim 72'		S. Kadhim 62'

Al-Shaab Stadium, Baghdad
Referee: Mahmoud Nouraddin

== Final ==
20 August 2002

Al-Talaba	0–1	Al-Shorta
		Rehema 3' (o.g.)

Al-Shaab Stadium, Baghdad
Referee: Mohammed Sahib

Al-Talaba	Al-Shorta

GK	21	(Iraq) Saad Nassir
RB	13	(Iraq) Bassim Abdul-Hassan	Substituted off
CB	12	(Iraq) Haidar Abdul-Razzaq (c)
CB	5	(Iraq) Ali Rehema	Substituted off
LB	6	(Iraq) Bassim Abbas
RM	18	(Iraq) Mahdi Karim	Substituted off
CM	20	(Iraq) Bahaa Kadhim
CM	15	(Iraq) Hassan Turki
LM	22	(Iraq) Fawzi Abdul-Sada
CF	7	(Iraq) Ahmed Salah
CF	28	(Iraq) Younis Mahmoud
Substitutions:
MF	29	(Iraq) Talib Abdul-Latif	Substituted in
FW	10	(Iraq) Alaa Kadhim	Substituted in
FW	25	(Iraq) Qusay Hashim	Substituted in
Manager:
(Iraq) Thair Ahmed

GK	22	(Iraq) Oday Taleb
RB	7	(Iraq) Qais Issa
CB	4	(Iraq) Mahir Habib (c)
CB	5	(Iraq) Munaim Yousif
LB	18	(Iraq) Ahmad Kadhim
RM	13	(Iraq) Abbas Rahim		Substituted off
CM	31	(Iraq) Mohanad Mohammed Ali		Substituted off
CM	29	(Iraq) Ali Wahaib
LM	9	(Iraq) Ammar Abdul-Hussein
CF	6	(Iraq) Taiseer Abdul-Hussein		Substituted off
CF	11	(Iraq) Amer Mushraf
Substitutions:
MF	8	(Iraq) Mahir Ogla		Substituted in
MF	20	(Iraq) Fawzi Abdul-Sattar	(red card) 85'	Substituted in
FW	33	(Iraq) Hashim Ridha		Substituted in
Manager:
(Iraq) Basim Qasim

Assistant referees:
Arslan Qadir
Mohammed Arab
Fourth official:
Najim Abboud

Match rules

- 90 minutes.
- 30 minutes of golden goal extra time if necessary.
- Penalty shoot-out if scores still level.
- Seven named substitutes, of which up to three may be used.

Umm al-Ma'arik Championship
2002–03 winner
Al-Shorta
3rd title

== Awards ==
Top Goalscorer	Best Player	Best Goalkeeper
Husham Mohammed (Al-Zawraa)	Ahmed Salah (Al-Talaba)	Oday Taleb (Al-Shorta)
