= 7th Umm al-Ma'arik Championship =

Umm al-Ma'arik Championship
Tournament details
- Country: Iraq
- Dates: September 1997 – 6 February 1998
- Teams: 8

Final positions
- Champions: Al-Najaf
- Runners-up: Al-Shorta
- Third place: Al-Zawraa
- Fourth place: Al-Talaba

Tournament statistics
- Top goal scorer(s): Mahmoud Majeed; Salman Hussein; Waleed Dhahid (4 goals each)

The 7th Umm al-Ma'arik Championship (Arabic: بطولة أم المعارك السابعة) was the seventh occurrence of the Baghdad Championship, organised by the Iraq Football Association. The top eight teams of the 1996–97 Iraqi Premier League competed in the tournament. In the final, held at Al-Shaab Stadium, Al-Najaf defeated Al-Shorta 4–0.

== Group stage ==
=== Group 1 ===
Team	Pld	W	D	L	GF	GA	GD	Pts
Al-Najaf	3	2	1	0	5	0	+5	7
Al-Zawraa	3	2	1	0	5	2	+3	7
Al-Minaa	3	0	1	2	3	7	−4	1
Al-Mosul	3	0	1	2	3	7	−4	1

Al-Zawraa	3–1	Al-Minaa
S. Abbas; Saddam (pen.)

Al-Najaf	3–0	Al-Mosul

Al-Mosul	1–2	Al-Zawraa
		Mohammed; H. Abbas

Al-Najaf	2–0	Al-Minaa

Al-Najaf	0–0	Al-Zawraa

Al-Mosul	2–2	Al-Minaa

=== Group 2 ===
Team	Pld	W	D	L	GF	GA	GD	Pts
Al-Shorta	3	2	1	0	14	7	+7	7
Al-Talaba	3	2	1	0	6	4	+2	7
Al-Quwa Al-Jawiya	3	1	0	2	8	9	−1	3
Samarra	3	0	0	3	2	10	−8	0

Al-Quwa Al-Jawiya	0–1	Al-Talaba
		Chathir

Al-Shorta	4–0	Samarra

Al-Talaba	3–3	Al-Shorta
		Majeed; Qais 89', 90+5' (pen.)

Al-Quwa Al-Jawiya	4–1	Samarra

Samarra	1–2	Al-Talaba

Al-Quwa Al-Jawiya	4–7	Al-Shorta
Dhahid (pen.); Omran; Mezher		Majeed; Assem; Qais; Al-Hail

== Semifinals ==
1998

Al-Shorta	1–1 (a.e.t.)	Al-Zawraa
Qais		Fawzi
Penalties
Majeed (penalty scored); Abdul-Sattar (penalty scored); Rahim (penalty scored)	3–1	(penalty missed) Saddam; (penalty scored) Hamad; (penalty missed) Fawzi; (penalty missed) Qassim

1998

Al-Najaf	1–1 (a.e.t.)	Al-Talaba
Penalties
	3–1

== Third place match ==
1998

Al-Zawraa	7–0	Al-Talaba
Hamad; Mahdi; Karim; Qassim; Hussein; Abdul-Jabar (pen.)

== Final ==
6 February 1998

Al-Najaf	4–0	Al-Shorta
Hassan 60'; Hussein 65', 72'; Najim 75'

Al-Shaab Stadium, Baghdad
Referee: Hazem Hussein

Al-Najaf	Al-Shorta

GK	1	(Iraq) Ahmed Ali Hussein
DF	13	(Iraq) Falah Hassan
DF	21	(Iraq) Haider Hameed
DF	3	(Iraq) Munir Jaber
DF	24	(Iraq) Kadhim Hussein
MF	17	(Iraq) Ali Hashim
MF	12	(Iraq) Basim Mohammed
MF	16	(Iraq) Hamid Raheem
MF	23	(Iraq) Salem Hussein
FW	9	(Iraq) Haidar Najim
FW	10	(Iraq) Salman Hussein
Manager:
(Iraq) Najih Humoud

GK	1	(Iraq) Ayad Khudhor
DF	5	(Iraq) Salam Touma
DF	19	(Iraq) Sadiq Saadoun
DF	12	(Iraq) Adil Ogla
DF	23	(Iraq) Mazin Abdul-Sattar
MF	13	(Iraq) Abbas Rahim
MF	6	(Iraq) Ayad Abbas	Substituted off
MF	28	(Iraq) Abdul-Hussein Jawad
MF	11	(Iraq) Saad Qais
FW	18	(Iraq) Mahmoud Majeed
FW	10	(Iraq) Mufeed Assem	Substituted off
Substitutions:
MF		(Iraq) Kadhim Hussein Shahima	Substituted on
FW	26	(Iraq) Ahmed Jadiea	Substituted on
Managers:
(Iraq) Abdelilah Abdul-Hameed (Iraq) Ayoub Odisho

Assistant referees:
Falah Hassan
Raad Saleem
Shaker Mahmoud

Match rules

- 90 minutes.
- 30 minutes of golden goal extra time if necessary.
- Penalty shoot-out if scores still level.
- Seven named substitutes, of which up to three may be used.

Umm al-Ma'arik Championship
1997–98 winner
Al-Najaf
1st title
