= 1999–2000 Iraqi First Division League =

Iraqi First Division League
- Season: 1999–2000
- Champions: Al-Zawraa (9th title)
- 2001–02 Asian Club Championship: Al-Zawraa
- 2001–02 Asian Cup Winners' Cup: Al-Quwa Al-Jawiya
- Top goalscorer: Haidar Ayed (28 goals)

The 1999–2000 Iraqi First Division League was the 26th season of the top-tier Iraqi national football league since its foundation in 1974. The name of the league was changed from Iraqi Premier League to Iraqi First Division League, and the season kicked off on 1 October 1999. The league title was won by Al-Zawraa for the second season in a row and the ninth time in their history.

They also won the Iraq FA Cup, the Umm al-Ma'arik Championship and the Iraqi Perseverance Cup in this season, completing only the second domestic quadruple in Iraqi football history after Al-Quwa Al-Jawiya achieved it in the 1996–97 season.

== League table ==
Pos	Team	Pld	W	D	L	GF	GA	GD	Pts	Qualification
1	Al-Zawraa (C)	50	34	12	4	112	35	+77	114	2001–02 Asian Club Championship
2	Al-Quwa Al-Jawiya	50	32	14	4	99	30	+69	110	2001–02 Asian Cup Winners' Cup (Note: Al-Quwa Al-Jawiya qualified for the Cup Winners' Cup as runners-up of the Iraq FA Cup, won by Al-Zawraa.)
3	Al-Shorta	50	33	11	6	97	34	+63	110	
4	Al-Talaba	50	30	10	10	116	56	+60	100	
5	Duhok	50	28	14	8	80	44	+36	98	
6	Al-Karkh	50	25	14	11	96	41	+55	89	
7	Salahaddin	50	22	19	9	61	39	+22	85	
8	Al-Minaa	50	20	24	6	56	28	+28	84	
9	Al-Najaf	50	23	14	13	64	44	+20	83	
10	Erbil	50	20	10	20	69	66	+3	70	
11	Al-Difaa Al-Jawi	50	19	13	18	58	57	+1	70	
12	Al-Ramadi	50	17	16	17	55	60	−5	67	
13	Al-Jaish	50	18	11	21	56	50	+6	65	
14	Diyala	50	17	14	19	56	63	−7	65	
15	Samarra	50	17	12	21	49	67	−18	63	
16	Al-Mosul	50	16	13	21	45	72	−27	61	
17	Al-Naft	50	15	14	21	56	60	−4	59	
18	Al-Nasiriya	50	14	10	26	62	81	−19	52	
19	Al-Diwaniya	50	11	18	21	41	60	−19	51	
20	Al-Samawa	50	13	11	26	56	90	−34	50	
21	Al-Kadhimiya	50	13	11	26	47	84	−37	50	
22	Al-Kut	50	11	15	24	45	78	−33	48	
23	Karbala	50	10	15	25	44	91	−47	45	
24	Maysan	50	8	14	28	34	83	−49	38	
25	Kirkuk	50	6	12	32	39	93	−54	30	
26	Haifa	50	3	9	38	27	114	−87	18	

Source: Ali Al-Sabti Archive
(C) Champions

== Results ==
Home \ Away	DIF	DIW	JSH	KAD	KAR	KUT	MIN	MSL	NFT	NJF	NAS	QWJ	RAM	SMA	SHR	TLB	ZWR	DIY	DUH	ERB	HAI	KRB	KIR	MAY	SAL	SMR
Al-Difaa Al-Jawi		0–0	2–1	0–1	0–4	1–0	0–0	2–1	2–1	1–1	3–1	1–2	5–2	1–1	0–3	1–1	1–3	3–1	0–0	1–0	2–1	1–1	4–3	1–1	0–0	3–0
Al-Diwaniya	2–0		0–3	3–1	0–1	0–0	0–2	2–1	1–2	0–1	0–0	0–0	1–0	2–2	1–1	3–3	0–4	0–0	1–1	2–0	0–0	0–0	6–1	0–0	0–2	1–1
Al-Jaish	1–1	1–1		2–2	0–0	1–1	0–0	4–0	0–0	2–3	4–2	0–2	0–1	1–1	0–3	1–0	0–1	0–1	0–1	5–0	2–0	2–0	1–0	2–0	0–1	0–0
Al-Kadhimiya	2–1	0–1	0–2		0–0	1–0	1–1	1–1	1–1	0–0	3–2	1–4	2–1	3–1	1–3	0–1	0–4	1–1	1–2	1–0	3–2	0–1	1–0	2–2	0–2	1–2
Al-Karkh	3–0	1–0	2–0	2–0		7–0	1–0	1–1	1–1	2–2	3–0	0–0	2–1	6–1	1–1	1–2	1–0	2–2	0–1	2–1	2–2	6–0	0–1	9–0	0–2	7–0
Al-Kut	0–1	2–0	1–0	2–1	0–4		1–1	0–1	0–1	1–0	2–2	0–0	1–1	2–1	0–1	0–2	1–1	2–0	1–2	0–1	2–1	0–0	3–1	3–0	1–3	1–1
Al-Minaa	1–0	0–0	1–0	1–0	2–1	2–1		2–0	2–1	6–0	0–0	0–0	1–1	3–1	0–0	0–0	0–1	1–1	0–0	0–0	5–1	5–1	1–0	1–1	0–0	2–0
Al-Mosul	1–0	2–1	3–1	1–0	1–1	1–1	1–1		0–0	0–0	2–0	0–0	1–0	1–0	0–1	2–0	1–0	1–3	0–1	0–3	4–1	2–2	2–1	2–1	1–0	2–0
Al-Naft	0–1	1–0	1–2	5–0	0–0	4–0	0–1	2–1		0–0	4–1	0–2	2–2	1–2	0–1	0–1	1–5	2–1	0–2	0–0	1–1	5–0	3–0 (Note: The Al-Naft–Kirkuk match originally ended in a 1–1 draw but was changed to a 3–0 win for Al-Naft due to Kirkuk fielding the ineligible player Fadhil Jalil.)	1–0	1–0	4–0
Al-Najaf	1–0	1–2	1–0	2–0	2–1	3–0	1–0	1–0	1–1		3–1	1–2	0–1	8–2	0–0	1–2	1–0	2–0	0–1	1–0	1–0	4–2	4–1	2–1	1–2	2–0
Al-Nasiriya	0–1	1–2	2–0	2–0	0–1	1–1	0–0	0–0	3–0	0–1		2–2	0–1	3–0	0–1	4–3	0–1	2–3	2–0	3–2	6–1	3–0	0–0	2–0	2–1	1–2
Al-Quwa Al-Jawiya	2–1	1–0	2–1	3–0	0–1	2–0	1–0	9–1	1–0	2–1	3–0		2–0	3–1	1–1	3–2	0–1	4–1	4–1	6–2	6–0	1–1	4–0	1–1	1–0	2–1
Al-Ramadi	0–1	1–1	0–0	2–0	0–0	1–1	2–2	3–1	2–0	0–0	2–0	1–0		1–1	0–1	2–4	1–1	3–1	1–1	2–1	2–0	2–1	0–0	1–0	0–0	0–1
Al-Samawa	2–1	0–2	0–1	1–2	1–2	2–2	0–2	4–1	0–0	1–0	2–1	1–2	3–3		0–2	4–2	3–3	1–0	0–0	2–0	1–0	1–1	2–0	3–2	0–1	1–0
Al-Shorta	1–0	3–1	1–2	6–3	1–2	4–1	0–0	4–0	3–0 (Note: The Al-Shorta–Al-Naft match originally ended in a 2–0 win for Al-Naft but was changed to a 3–0 win for Al-Shorta due to Al-Naft fielding the ineligible player Nizar Ali.)	2–1	2–1	0–1	1–0	2–1		0–3	1–2	6–2	4–0	1–0	3–0	6–2	3–0	2–0	1–0	0–0
Al-Talaba	1–0	2–1	1–0	6–0	1–2	2–1	1–1	1–0	5–2	2–2	2–1	1–1	1–0	5–2	1–2		1–0	4–0	2–2	4–2	2–0	5–0	6–0	7–1	2–2	6–1
Al-Zawraa	2–1	4–0	3–1	0–0	4–1	5–0	2–2	1–1	1–0	2–1	7–1	0–0	4–0	2–1	1–1	3–1		3–0	3–0	5–1	3–0	3–0	3–2	7–1	0–0	2–1
Diyala	1–0	1–0	2–0	2–2	1–0	0–1	1–1	4–1	1–0	0–0	0–0	2–2	3–0	3–0	0–0	0–1	0–2		1–2	0–1	3–1	3–1	1–0	0–0	0–1	1–0
Duhok	0–0	4–0	1–3	2–1	2–1	2–0	0–0	3–0	1–1	0–0	5–1	1–0	1–0	4–1	2–0	1–0	1–2	3–0		1–0	4–0	1–0	2–1	6–1	2–2	4–2
Erbil	1–1	3–1	1–0	0–0	3–2	2–1	1–0	2–0	6–1	1–1	1–0	0–4	6–1	4–0	1–6	1–3	1–2	0–0	1–1		1–0	1–0	7–0	1–0	0–0	4–0
Haifa	1–2	2–0	0–0	0–4	0–4	0–2	0–1	0–1	1–2	1–3	1–1	1–6	1–2	1–0	0–4	0–4	1–3	3–3	0–5	0–2		1–1	0–0	1–2	0–2	0–1
Karbala	0–3 (Note: The Karbala–Al-Difaa Al-Jawi match originally ended in a 3–1 win for Karbala but was changed to a 3–0 win for Al-Difaa Al-Jawi due to Karbala fielding the ineligible player Mohammed Ridha.)	1–1	0–2	1–2	1–0	3–1	0–2	3–1	1–1	1–2	3–2	0–1	2–1	0–0	2–3	2–2	0–0	0–3	1–1	1–0	0–1		1–3	0–0	3–0	0–4
Kirkuk	1–1	0–0	2–3	3–0	2–3	3–3	0–1	1–1	2–2	0–1	1–3	0–0	2–2	0–1	0–3	0–3	0–1	1–0	0–1	0–0	1–0	1–2		3–1	1–2	0–2
Maysan	1–3	0–1	1–3	1–0	1–1	2–1	0–1	0–0	0–1	1–0	0–1	0–2	0–1	1–0	0–1	2–1	1–1	1–1	3–0	0–1	0–0	0–1	1–0		1–2	1–1
Salahaddin	2–0	1–0	1–0	2–1	1–1	1–1	1–1	2–0	1–0	0–0	4–0	1–1	1–2	2–1	1–1	1–1	3–4	1–2	2–2	2–0	1–0	1–1	1–1	2–1		0–0
Samarra	2–4	2–1	1–2	0–1	0–1	2–0	4–0	2–0	1–0	0–0	1–2	0–1	0–3	1–0	0–0	1–3	0–0	1–0	1–0	3–3	4–0	1–0	1–0	0–0	1–1	

Source: Ali Al-Sabti Archive
Legend: Blue = home team win; Yellow = draw; Red = away team win.

== Season statistics ==
=== Top scorers ===
Pos	Scorer	Goals	Team
1	Haidar Ayed	28	Al-Nasiriya
2	Qahtan Chathir	27	Al-Karkh
3	Mufeed Assem	25	Al-Shorta

=== Hat-tricks ===
Player	For	Against	Result	Date
(Iraq) Abbas Rahim	Al-Zawraa	Maysan	7–1	1 October 1999
(Iraq) Qahtan Chathir^{5}	Al-Karkh	Al-Kut	7–0	1 October 1999
(Iraq) Alaa Kadhim	Al-Talaba	Al-Ramadi	4–2	15 October 1999
(Iraq) Mushtaq Kadhim	Al-Naft	Karbala	5–0	15 October 1999
(Iraq) Majid Abbas^{5}	Al-Najaf	Al-Samawa	8–2	18 October 1999
(Iraq) Qahtan Chathir	Al-Karkh	Maysan	9–0	25 October 1999
(Iraq) Ammar Abdul-Hussein	Al-Karkh	Maysan	9–0	25 October 1999
(Iraq) Ziad Mahmoud	Erbil	Al-Naft	6–1	25 October 1999
(Iraq) Ahmed Abdul-Jabar	Al-Zawraa	Erbil	5–1	30 October 1999
(Iraq) Ammar Ahmed	Al-Zawraa	Al-Kut	5–0	5 November 1999
(Iraq) Salah Hadi	Al-Diwaniya	Kirkuk	6–1	10 November 1999
(Iraq) Akram Emmanuel	Al-Quwa Al-Jawiya	Al-Mosul	9–1	17 November 1999
(Iraq) Saddam Aziz	Karbala	Samarra	4–0	17 November 1999
(Iraq) Essam Hamad	Al-Zawraa	Al-Nasiriya	7–1	22 November 1999
(Iraq) Shakhwan Omar	Erbil	Kirkuk	7–0	29 November 1999
(Iraq) Ehab Ibrahim	Maysan	Duhok	3–0	13 December 1999
(Iraq) Majid Awda	Al-Nasiriya	Al-Talaba	4–3	7 January 2000
(Iraq) Abbas Hassan	Al-Karkh	Al-Kut	4–0	7 January 2000
(Iraq) Ahmed Khudhair	Al-Quwa Al-Jawiya	Erbil	6–2	7 February 2000
(Iraq) Mufeed Assem^{4}	Al-Shorta	Al-Kut	4–1	14 February 2000
(Iraq) Mohammed Kadhim	Erbil	Al-Ramadi	6–1	14 February 2000
(Iraq) Nabeel Anthil	Kirkuk	Al-Kut	3–3	21 February 2000
(Iraq) Hashim Ridha^{4}	Al-Shorta	Karbala	6–2	24 February 2000
(Iraq) Mohammed Kadhim	Erbil	Samarra	4–0	4 May 2000
(Iraq) Mohammed Yousif	Duhok	Al-Nasiriya	5–1	15 May 2000
(Iraq) Ahmed Jadiea^{4}	Duhok	Maysan	6–1	25 May 2000
(Iraq) Qahtan Chathir	Al-Karkh	Haifa	4–0	2 June 2000
(Iraq) Emad Mohammed	Al-Zawraa	Al-Diwaniya	4–0	8 June 2000
(Iraq) Ahmed Sabri	Al-Shorta	Diyala	6–2	8 June 2000
(Iraq) Qahtan Chathir	Al-Karkh	Samarra	7–0	8 June 2000
(Iraq) Haidar Ayed	Al-Nasiriya	Haifa	6–1	15 June 2000

Notes

^{4} Player scored 4 goals
^{5} Player scored 5 goals
