= 6th Umm al-Ma'arik Championship =

Umm al-Ma'arik Championship
Tournament details
- Country: Iraq
- Dates: 10–20 September 1996
- Teams: 8

Final positions
- Champions: Al-Quwa Al-Jawiya
- Runner-up: Al-Zawraa
- Third place: Al-Najaf
- Fourth place: Al-Shorta

Tournament statistics
- Top goal scorer(s): Hussam Fawzi; Mufeed Assem; Waleed Dhahid (4 goals each)

The 6th Umm al-Ma'arik Championship (Arabic: بطولة أم المعارك السادسة) was the sixth occurrence of the Baghdad Championship, organised by the Iraq Football Association. The top eight teams of the 1995–96 Iraqi Advanced League competed in the tournament. The competition started on 10 September 1996 and ended on 20 September 1996 where, in the final, held at Al-Shaab Stadium, Al-Quwa Al-Jawiya defeated Al-Zawraa 1–0.

== Group stage ==
=== Group 1 ===
Team	Pld	W	D	L	GF	GA	GD	Pts
Al-Zawraa	3	2	1	0	8	3	+5	7
Al-Shorta	3	1	1	1	8	7	+1	4
Al-Karkh	3	0	2	1	4	7	−3	2
Al-Talaba	3	0	2	1	4	7	−3	2

Al-Zawraa	4–1	Al-Talaba
Fawzi; Abbas; Saddam (pen.)		Goal

Al-Karkh	2–5	Al-Shorta
Rahim; Tariq		Jawad (pen.); Assem; Ogla

Al-Zawraa	1–1	Al-Karkh
Fawzi; Saddam (penalty missed); Abbas (penalty missed)		Abdul-Jabar

Al-Talaba	2–2	Al-Shorta
Jaber		Abbas (pen.); Assem

Al-Zawraa	3–1	Al-Shorta
Fawzi; Abbas; Abdul-Razzaq		Assem

Al-Karkh	1–1	Al-Talaba
Khanjar		Goal

=== Group 2 ===
Team	Pld	W	D	L	GF	GA	GD	Pts
Al-Quwa Al-Jawiya	3	2	0	1	7	4	+3	6
Al-Najaf	3	1	2	0	6	4	+2	5
Al-Naft	3	1	1	1	5	4	+1	4
Al-Ramadi	3	0	1	2	4	10	−6	1

11 September 1996

Al-Quwa Al-Jawiya	4–1	Al-Ramadi

Al-Naft	1–1	Al-Najaf

Al-Quwa Al-Jawiya	3–1	Al-Naft

Al-Ramadi	3–3	Al-Najaf

Al-Quwa Al-Jawiya	0–2	Al-Najaf

Al-Ramadi	0–3	Al-Naft

== Semifinals ==
17 September 1996

Al-Quwa Al-Jawiya	3–1	Al-Shorta
Dhahid; Farhan		Khudhair

Al-Shaab Stadium, Baghdad

Al-Zawraa	0–0 (a.e.t.)	Al-Najaf
Penalties
	4–3

== Third place match ==
Al-Shorta	0–1	Al-Najaf
		Hashim

Al-Shaab Stadium, Baghdad

== Final ==
20 September 1996

Al-Quwa Al-Jawiya	1–0 (a.e.t.)	Al-Zawraa
Abdul-Sattar 113' (o.g.)

Al-Shaab Stadium, Baghdad

Umm al-Ma'arik Championship
1996–97 winner
Al-Quwa Al-Jawiya
2nd title
