= Adel Nima =

Iraqi footballer

Personal information
- Full name: Adel Nima
- Date of birth: 26 February 1970 (age 56)
- Place of birth: Baghdad, Iraq
- Height: 1.82 m (6 ft 0 in)
- Position: Right back

Team information
- Current team: Al-Hudood SC (Manager)

Youth career
- –1990: Al-Naft

Senior career*
| Years | Team | Apps | (Gls) |
| 1990−1993 | Al-Naft | | |
| 1993−2001 | Al-Talaba | | |
| 2001−2003 | Al-Jazirah Al-Hamra | | |
| 2003−2006 | Al-Sinaa | | |

International career
| 1990−1991 | Iraq U−20 | | |
| 1991−1996 | Iraq U−23 | | |
| 1996−1998 | Iraq | | |

Managerial career
- 2006–2007: Al-Sinaa SC U-17
- 2008–2012: Al-Hudood
- 2010: Iraq school football team
- 2012: Iraq school football team
- 2013–2014: Al-Hudood
- 2014–2016: Iraq U-20 (Assist. coach)
- 2015–2017: Al-Hudood
- 2017–2018: Naft Al-Wasat
- 2018: Al-Talaba
- 2018–2019: Al-Hudood
- 2019–2020: Al-Sinaat Al-Kahrabaiya
- 2021: Al-Qasim SC
- 2021: Al-Sinaat Al-Kahrabaiya
- 2023–24: Al-Hudood
- 2024-: Al-Naft
- * Club domestic league appearances and goals

Adel Nima (Arabic: عَادِل نِعْمَة; born 26 February 1970) is a coach and former international Iraqi football player. He played as a defender, he is currently working as a coach for Al-Sinaat Al-Kahrabaiya

== Coaching career ==
=== Al-Hudood ===
On 24 July 2018, Nima signed for Al-Hudood SC for one season contract. The club wanted a mid-table finish in the Iraqi Premier League. Nima knew the goal and the team had a good first round with only 6 wins out of 18, the team was in mid-table. In the 2nd round, Al-Hudood SC had a very bad start and did not have many wins until the last fixtures which made Nima's team go for 9th place out of 20 with 50 points same as 7th and 8th places. Making one of the best finishes for the club. Nima did not renew his contract wanting to go for a new experiences.

=== Al-Sinaat Al-Kahrabaiya ===
On July 28, 2019, Nima was appointed as Al-Sinaat Al-Kahrabaiya manager with new challenges.

== Managerial statistics ==
As of match played 19 April 2022

Managerial record by team and tenure
| Team | From | To | Record | | | | |
| Team | From | To | P | W | D | L | Win % |
|---|---|---|---|---|---|---|---|
| Al-Hudood | 1 June 2015 | 10 August 2017 | 54 | 10 | 20 | 24 | 18.5 |
| Naft Al-Wasat | 30 August 2017 | 3 February 2018 | 19 | 8 | 6 | 5 | 42.11 |
| Al-Talaba | 2 April 2018 | 22 April 2018 | 3 | 0 | 0 | 3 | 0.00 |
| Al-Hudood | 24 July 2018 | 23 July 2019 | 48 | 15 | 20 | 13 | 31.3 |
| Al-Sinaat Al-Kahrabaiya | 28 July 2019 | 23 June 2020 | 26 | 10 | 9 | 7 | 38.5 |
| Al-Qasim SC | 8 January 2021 | 22 March 2021 | 17 | 4 | 8 | 5 | 23.5 |
| Al-Sinaat Al-Kahrabaiya | 22 May 2021 | 30 July 2021 | 12 | 1 | 6 | 5 | 8.3 |
| Al-Hudood | 10 October 2021 | ""Present"" | 22 | 12 | 8 | 2 | 54.5 |
| Total | | | 201 | 60 | 77 | 64 | 29.9 |

== Honors ==
=== Player ===
Al-Talaba

- Baghdad Championship: 1993–94, 1995–96
- Asian Cup Winners' Cup: runner-up: 1995

Iraq national football team U-23

- Nehru Cup: 1995
- Pestabola Merdeka: 1995

Iraq national football team

- Nehru Cup: 1997

=== As A Manager ===
Al-Hudood SC

- Iraqi First Division League: 2021–22

Individual

- Iraq Stars League Manager of the Month: October 2024
