= List of Al-Talaba SC seasons =

Al-Talaba SC is an Iraqi professional association football club based in Al-Rusafa, Baghdad, who currently play in the Iraqi Premier League. It was established in 1969, and has not been relegated from the Iraqi Premier League since its promotion in 1975.

The club moved to Al Talaba Stadium in the early-1980s. Since 2010 the club has played their home games at several stadiums until the construction of the new stadium is finished. Al-Talaba is part of the Popular Teams of Baghdad, who whenever they play against each other, it is considered a derby. The other Popular Teams are Al-Shorta, Al-Zawraa and Al-Quwa Al-Jawiya. The club has won the Iraqi Premier League five times, the Iraq FA Cup twice and the Baghdad Championship three times.

In the 1995 Asian Cup Winners' Cup Al-Talaba reached the final and lost to Bellmare Hiratsuka, becoming only the third Iraqi team (Aliyat Al-Shorta were the first in 1971 and Al-Rasheed were the second in 1989) to have reached this far into an AFC competition. They are also the first Iraqi team to become the runners-up of the Asian Cup Winners' Cup.

== Key ==
Key to league:

- Pos = Final position
- P = Played
- W = Games won
- D = Games drawn
- L = Games lost
- GF = Goals scored
- GA = Goals against
- Pts = Points

Key to rounds:

- W = Winner
- RU = Runner-up
- SF = Semi-finals
- QF = Quarter-finals
- R16/R32 = Round of 16, round of 32, etc.
- 1R/2R = First round, second round, etc.
- GS = Group stage

Champions	Runners-up

== Seasons ==
Tables correct as of 2 June 2026

=== Regional ===
Season	League									Iraq FA Cup	FA Baghdad Cup	Asia / Arab	Notes
Season	Division (tier)	P	W	D	L	F	A	Pts	Pos	Iraq FA Cup	FA Baghdad Cup	Asia / Arab	Notes
1970–71	Central Div 2 (2)								1st	N/A	N/A		
1971–72	Central Prem (1)	7	1	1	5	8	16	3	8th	N/A	N/A	Not held	
1972–73	Central Div 2 (2)									N/A	N/A	Not held	(Note: Information about the season are unavailable.)
1973–74	Central Div 2 (2)									N/A	Banned	Not held	

=== National ===
Season	League									Iraq FA Cup	Baghdad Championship	Asia / Arab		Notes
Season	Division (tier)	P	W	D	L	F	A	Pts	Pos	Iraq FA Cup	Baghdad Championship	Asia / Arab		Notes
1974–75	Div 2 (2)	17							5th	N/A	N/A	Not held		
1975–76	Prem (1)	24	6	8	10	16	24	20	8th	QF	N/A	Not held		
1976–77	Prem (1)	11	4	7	0	9	3	15	2nd	Not held	N/A	Not held		(Note: The season was finished early due to scheduling difficulties.)
1977–78	Prem (1)	13	4	6	3	8	10	14	8th	QF	N/A	Not held		
1978–79	Prem (1)	12	6	3	3	17	12	15	3rd	Banned	N/A	Not held		
1979–80	Prem (1)	22	11	5	6	27	13	27	3rd	RU	N/A	Not held		
1980–81	Prem (1)	11	8	1	2	19	5	17	1st	RU	N/A	Not held		
1981–82	Prem (1)	22	14	6	2	44	16	34	1st	RU	N/A			
1982–83	Prem (1)	22	15	3	4	43	21	33	2nd	QF	N/A	Not held		
1983–84	Prem (1)	24	14	8	2	40	19	36	2nd	QF	N/A	Not held		
1984–85	Prem (1)	15	8	5	2	26	14	29	N/A	QF	N/A			(Note: The season was not finished due to the 1986 FIFA World Cup qualifiers.) (Note: During this season, each win was worth 3 points as opposed to 2 points.)
1985–86	Prem (1)	15	11	3	1	26	8	25	1st	Not held	N/A			
1986–87	Prem (1)	44	15	15	14	34	34	45	6th	R32	N/A	Asian Club Championship	4th	
1987–88	Prem (1)	30	8	14	8	29	31	30	8th	SF	N/A			
1988–89	Prem (1)	26	14	5	7	41	27	–	RU	QF	N/A			(Note: The season was played in a groups format. The draws column includes matches that went to a penalty shootout.)
1989–90	Prem (1)	26	12	7	7	32	19	31	6th	R16	N/A			
1990–91	Prem (1)	28	17	7	4	49	22	41	2nd	R16	N/A			
1991–92	Prem (1)	38	24	7	7	66	29	55	4th	R16	3rd			
1992–93	Prem (1)	69	46	18	5	130	34	110	1st	RU	W			
1993–94	Prem (1)	50	30	15	5	88	42	75	3rd	RU	W			
1994–95	Prem (1)	46	28	14	4	80	29	106	4th	1R	RU			(Note: During this season, each win was worth 3 points as opposed to 2 points, but each win by 3 or more goals was worth 4 points. In every season after this one, each win has been worth 3 points no matter how big the win is.)
1995–96	Prem (1)	22	8	7	7	34	30	31	6th		W	Asian Cup Winners' Cup	RU	
1996–97	Prem (1)	30	17	9	4	58	16	60	3rd	QF	R1			
1997–98	Prem (1)	30	18	7	5	67	28	61	5th	QF	4th			
1998–99	Prem (1)	30	24	3	3	71	25	75	2nd	RU	3rd	Asian Cup Winners' Cup	4th	
1999–2000	Prem (1)	50	30	10	10	116	56	100	4th	R16	4th			
2000–01	Prem (1)	30	17	9	4	43	22	60	4th	Not held	4th	Asian Cup Winners' Cup	1R	
2001–02	Prem (1)	38	29	4	5	89	18	91	1st	W	RU			
2002–03	Prem (1)	24	19	2	3	56	15	59	N/A	W	RU	AFC Champions League	GS	(Note: The season was not finished due to the Iraq War.)
2003–04	Prem (1)	2	2	0	0	5	1	6	N/A	Not held	RU	Arab Champions League	QF	(Note: The season was played in a groups format.) (Note: The season was not finished due to security issues.)
2004–05	Prem (1)	23	11	7	5	32	17	–	3rd	Not held	N/A			
2005–06	Prem (1)	16	9	4	3	29	11	–	2nd – Group 4 – Second stage	Not held	N/A	Arab Champions League	R16	
2006–07	Prem (1)	15	5	6	4	11	11	–	4th	Not held	N/A			
2007–08	Prem (1)	30	10	13	7	29	24	–	3rd – Group 2 – Elite stage	Not held	N/A	Arab Champions League	R32	
2008–09	Prem (1)	24	14	5	5	32	15	47	3rd – Group 2 – Group stage	Not held	N/A			
2009–10	Prem (1)	43	23	13	7	53	25	–	RU	Not held	N/A			
2010–11	Prem (1)	26	9	11	6	33	25	38	8th – Group B – Group stage	Not held	N/A	AFC Cup	GS	
2011–12	Prem (1)	38	19	11	8	45	29	68	4th	Not held	N/A			
2012–13	Prem (1)	34	9	8	17	35	47	35	14th	R16 (Note: The cup was abandoned due to scheduling issues.)	N/A			
2013–14	Prem (1)	22	9	4	9	28	30	31	8th	Not held	N/A			(Note: The season was finished early due to security issues.)
2014–15	Prem (1)	16	4	5	7	18	18	17	5th – Group 2 – Group stage	Not held	N/A			
2015–16	Prem (1)	24	10	9	5	28	20	–	3rd – Final stage	Did not enter	N/A			
2016–17	Prem (1)	36	14	12	10	51	38	54	7th	QF	N/A			
2017–18	Prem (1)	38	11	10	17	43	59	43	14th	Not held	N/A			
2018–19	Prem (1)	38	10	14	14	47	52	44	13th	SF	N/A			
2019–20	Prem (1)	6	2	2	2	11	10	–	N/A	R32 (Note: The cup was abandoned due to the COVID-19 pandemic.)	N/A			(Note: The season was not finished due to the COVID-19 pandemic.)
2020–21	Prem (1)	38	8	15	15	36	47	39	17th	R32	N/A			
2021–22	Prem (1)	38	20	9	9	54	33	69	3rd	R32	N/A			
2022–23	Prem (1)	38	19	9	10	52	39	66	4th	QF	N/A			
2023–24	Prem (1)	38	13	14	11	40	38	53	8th	R16	N/A			
2024–25	Prem (1)	38	18	9	11	40	27	63	4th	QF	N/A			
2025–26	Prem (1)	38	18	11	9	53	38	65	6th	R16 (Note: The cup was abandoned due to scheduling issues.)	N/A			
