= 1st Baghdad Championship =

Baghdad Championship
Tournament details
- Country: Iraq
- Dates: 1 October 2003 – 5 January 2004
- Teams: 8

Final positions
- Champions: Al-Zawraa
- Runners-up: Al-Talaba

Tournament statistics
- Top goal scorer(s): Falah Hassan (3 goals)

Awards
- Best player: Ahmed Salah

The 1st Baghdad Championship (Arabic: بطولة بغداد الأولى) was the first occurrence of the tournament since it was renamed from its previous name of Umm al-Ma'arik Championship. It was organised by the Iraq Football Association. The top eight teams in the league table at the end of round 27 of the cancelled 2002–03 Iraqi First Division League competed in the tournament.

The competition started on 1 October 2003, with the third place match being cancelled and the final being postponed to 5 January 2004 for security reasons due to crowd trouble that occurred in the semi-finals. In the final, held at Al-Zawraa Stadium, Al-Zawraa defeated Al-Talaba 5–4 on penalties after a 2–2 draw that saw three red cards. This turned out to be the last edition of the tournament.

== Group stage ==
=== Group 1 ===
Team	Pld	W	D	L	GF	GA	GD	Pts
Al-Quwa Al-Jawiya	3	2	1	0	6	2	+4	7
Al-Talaba	3	1	2	0	3	2	+1	5
Al-Mosul	3	1	0	2	8	9	−1	3
Al-Minaa	3	0	1	2	4	8	−4	1

1 October 2003

Al-Quwa Al-Jawiya	3–1	Al-Mosul
Khudhair 8'; L. Salah 35'; Dhahid 36' (pen.)		Ahmad 21'

Al-Sinaa Stadium, Baghdad
1 October 2003

Al-Talaba	0–0	Al-Minaa

Al-Zawraa Stadium, Baghdad
3 October 2003

Al-Quwa Al-Jawiya	3–1	Al-Minaa
L. Salah; Khudhair; Ogla		Asi

Al-Sinaa Stadium, Baghdad
3 October 2003

Al-Talaba	3–2	Al-Mosul
Kadhim 33'; Sadir 88' (pen.); Karim 90+7'		Usama 50' (pen.); Numan 70'

Al-Karkh Stadium, Baghdad
Referee: Abdul-Aal Khudhair
5 October 2003

Al-Quwa Al-Jawiya	0–0	Al-Talaba

Al-Zawraa Stadium, Baghdad
Referee: Mahmoud Nouraddin
5 October 2003

Al-Mosul	5–3	Al-Minaa
Yahya 39' (pen.); Marzook 42'; Usama 53' (pen.); Idan 90'; Ahmad 90+4'		Hadi 20'; Falah 56', 78'

Al-Sinaa Stadium, Baghdad

=== Group 2 ===
Team	Pld	W	D	L	GF	GA	GD	Pts
Al-Shorta	3	2	1	0	3	1	+2	7
Al-Zawraa	3	1	2	0	5	1	+4	5
Al-Najaf	3	1	1	1	6	2	+4	4
Erbil	3	0	0	3	1	11	−10	0

2 October 2003

Al-Zawraa	0–0	Al-Najaf

Al-Shorta Stadium, Baghdad
2 October 2003

Al-Shorta	1–0	Erbil
Fadhel 55'

Al-Karkh Stadium, Baghdad
4 October 2003

Al-Zawraa	5–1	Erbil
Fahad 41', 42'; Abdul-Saha 50'; Jawad 70'; Abdul-Nabi 81'		Ghafil 68'

Baghdad
4 October 2003

Al-Shorta	2–1	Al-Najaf
Ridha 23', 48'		Jassim 12'

Al-Zawraa Stadium, Baghdad
6 October 2003

Al-Zawraa	0–0	Al-Shorta

Al-Karkh Stadium, Baghdad
6 October 2003

Erbil	0–5	Al-Najaf
		Sahib 8'; Hassan 30', 85'; Jassim 66'; Wahudi 68'

Al-Shorta Stadium, Baghdad

== Semifinals ==
8 October 2003

Al-Quwa Al-Jawiya	0–1	Al-Zawraa
		Ahmad 10'

Al-Karkh Stadium, Baghdad
Match was ended before stoppage time due to crowd trouble
8 October 2003

Al-Shorta	1–2	Al-Talaba
Abdul-Hussein 22'		Nassir 21'; A. Salah 32'

Al-Zawraa Stadium, Baghdad
Referee: Najim Aboud

== Final ==
5 January 2004

Al-Zawraa	2–2 (a.e.t.)	Al-Talaba
W. Kadhim (yellow card) (yellow-red card) 37'; Abdul-Sada 41' (pen.); H. Kadhim (red card) 51'; Fawzi 59'	Report	Abbas (yellow card) (yellow-red card) 40'; Kadhim 53'; Sadir 90+2'
Penalties
Fawzi (penalty scored); Abdul-Qadir (penalty scored); Mohammad (penalty scored); Raad (penalty scored); Abdul-Amir (penalty scored)	5–4	(penalty scored) Sadir; (penalty scored) Nayrouz; (penalty scored) B. Kadhim; (penalty scored) Jafar; (penalty missed) Wali

Al-Zawraa Stadium, Baghdad
Attendance: 15,000

Baghdad Championship
2003–04 winner
Al-Zawraa
3rd title

== Awards ==
Top Goalscorer	Best Player	Best Goalkeeper	Best Manager	Fair Play Award
Falah Hassan (Al-Najaf)	Ahmed Salah (Al-Talaba)	Saad Nassir (Al-Talaba)	Abdul-Ghani Shahad (Al-Najaf)	Al-Quwa Al-Jawiya
