= 2nd Umm al-Ma'arik Championship =

Umm al-Ma'arik Championship
Tournament details
- Country: Iraq
- Dates: 2–17 July 1992
- Teams: 8

Final positions
- Champions: Al-Talaba
- Runners-up: Al-Quwa Al-Jawiya
- Third place: Al-Zawraa
- Fourth place: Al-Naft

Tournament statistics
- Matches played: 16
- Goals scored: 35 (2.19 per match)
- Top goal scorer(s): Karim Saddam (7 goals)

Awards
- Best player: Hashim Khamis

The 2nd Umm al-Ma'arik Championship (Arabic: بطولة أم المعارك الثانية) was the second occurrence of the Baghdad Championship. Unlike the last season where the competition was organised by Al-Talaba, this season was organised by the Iraq Football Association. The top eight teams of the 1991–92 Iraqi National League competed in the tournament. The competition started on 2 July 1992 and ended on 17 July 1992 where, in the final, held at Al-Shaab Stadium, Al-Talaba defeated Al-Quwa Al-Jawiya after extra time.

== Background ==
After the Iraq Football Association adopted the Umm al-Ma'arik Championship, they held a meeting on 16 June 1992 to start the second edition of the competition which was decided to be from 2–17 July 1992 with the participation of the top eight teams from the 1991–92 Iraqi National League, instead of the top six, which included Al-Quwa Al-Jawiya, Al-Zawraa, Al-Karkh, Al-Talaba, Al-Shorta, Al-Najaf, Al-Tayaran (now known as Al-Khutoot) and Al-Naft. The FA set the matches to be played at Al-Shaab Stadium, Al-Kashafa Stadium and Al-Shorta Stadium.

== Group stage ==
The matches were drawn on 28 June 1992.

=== Group 1 ===
Team	Pld	W	D	L	GF	GA	GD	Pts
Al-Naft	3	3	0	0	5	0	+5	6
Al-Zawraa	3	2	0	1	4	3	+1	4
Al-Shorta	3	1	0	2	2	5	−3	2
Al-Tayaran	3	0	0	3	0	3	−3	0

2 July 1992
15:00 GMT

Al-Naft	1–0	Al-Tayaran
Hussein 58'

Al-Kashafa Stadium, Baghdad
Referee: Mohammed Nour Al-Din
2 July 1992
17:00 GMT

Al-Zawraa	3–1	Al-Shorta
Ogla 11'; Saddam 40' (pen.), 73'		Nouri 76' (pen.)

Al-Shaab Stadium, Baghdad
Referee: Tariq Ahmed
6 July 1992
15:00 GMT

Al-Shorta	1–0	Al-Tayaran
Yousif 83'

Al-Kashafa Stadium, Baghdad
Referee: Hazim Al-Shaikhly
6 July 1992
17:00 GMT

Al-Naft	2–0	Al-Zawraa
Khudhair 55' (pen.); Hussein 67'

Al-Shaab Stadium, Baghdad
Referee: Abbas Abdul-Rahman
9 July 1992
15:00 GMT

Al-Shorta	0–2	Al-Naft
		Khudhair 51'; Hussein 75'

Al-Shaab Stadium, Baghdad
Referee: Adil Al-Qassab
9 July 1992
15:00 GMT

Al-Zawraa	1–0	Al-Tayaran
Mahdi 31'

Al-Kashafa Stadium, Baghdad
Referee: Abdul-Karim Al-Saadi

=== Group 2 ===
Team	Pld	W	D	L	GF	GA	GD	Pts
Al-Talaba	3	1	2	0	4	3	+1	4
Al-Quwa Al-Jawiya	3	1	2	0	2	1	+1	4
Al-Najaf	3	1	1	1	4	4	0	3
Al-Karkh	3	0	1	2	3	5	−2	1

2 July 1992
15:00 GMT

Al-Talaba	2–1	Al-Karkh
Baht 88' (o.g.); Karim 90+1'		Ashoor 16'

Al-Shaab Stadium, Baghdad
Referee: Abdul-Karim Al-Saadi
2 July 1992
15:00 GMT

Al-Quwa Al-Jawiya	1–0	Al-Najaf
Abdul-Hussein 83' (pen.)

Al-Shorta Stadium, Baghdad
Referee: Tariq Thar Hani
6 July 1992
15:00 GMT

Al-Talaba	1–1	Al-Najaf
Zoyan 24'		Juwad 57'

Al-Shorta Stadium, Baghdad
Referee: Farouq Tawfiq
6 July 1992
17:00 GMT

Al-Quwa Al-Jawiya	0–0	Al-Karkh

Al-Shaab Stadium, Baghdad
Referee: Adil Al-Qassab
9 July 1992
15:00 GMT

Al-Najaf	3–2	Al-Karkh
Najim 6'; Nouri 24', 83'		Kadhim 20', 40'

Al-Shorta Stadium, Baghdad
Referee: Abbas Abdul-Rahman
9 July 1992
17:00 GMT

Al-Quwa Al-Jawiya	1–1	Al-Talaba
Tahir 69'		Abdul-Qadir 89' (pen.)

Al-Shaab Stadium, Baghdad
Referee: Tariq Ahmed

== Semifinals ==
13 July 1992
15:00 GMT

Al-Naft	0–1	Al-Quwa Al-Jawiya
		Abbas 54'

Al-Shaab Stadium, Baghdad
Referee: Abbas Abdul-Rahman
13 July 1992
17:00 GMT

Al-Talaba	3–2 (a.e.t.)	Al-Zawraa
Karim 50'; Zaidan 80'; Awdah 100'		Naji 17'; Saddam 71' (pen.)

Al-Shaab Stadium, Baghdad
Referee: Tariq Ahmed

== Third place match ==
16 July 1992
15:00 GMT

Al-Naft	0–4	Al-Zawraa
		Saddam 33', 66', 69', 78'

Al-Shaab Stadium, Baghdad
Referee: Abdul-Karim Al-Saadi

== Final ==
17 July 1992
17:00 GMT

Al-Quwa Al-Jawiya	0–1 (a.e.t.)	Al-Talaba
	Report	Kadhim 104'

Al-Shaab Stadium, Baghdad
Referee: Tariq Ahmed

Al-Quwa Al-Jawiya	Al-Talaba

GK	(Iraq) Hashim Khamis
RB	(Iraq) Abdul-Jabbar Hashim
CB	(Iraq) Radhi Shenaishil
CB	(Iraq) Mohammed Jassim
LB	(Iraq) Saad Abdul-Hameed	(yellow card) 103'
RM	(Iraq) Shakir Tahir
CM	(Iraq) Basil Fadhil
LM	(Iraq) Ali Zughayir
AM	(Iraq) Majid Abbas
CF	(Iraq) Hazim Yassir
CF	(Iraq) Akram Emmanuel
Manager:
(Iraq) Adil Yousif

GK	1	(Iraq) Suhail Sabir
RB	19	(Iraq) Haider Mohammed
CB	5	(Iraq) Hisham Ali	(yellow card) 25'
CB	4	(Iraq) Raheem Awda
LB	2	(Iraq) Mudhafar Jabbar
RM	4	(Iraq) Habib Jafar
CM	18	(Iraq) Ali Hussein (c)	Substituted off
CM	9	(Iraq) Mahdi Kadhim
LM	17	(Iraq) Wali Karim
CF	10	(Iraq) Alaa Kadhim
CF	11	(Iraq) Muhannad Zaidan
Substitutes:
GK	20	(Iraq) Haitham Khalil
DF	3	(Iraq) Hamza Hadi
DF	16	(Iraq) Jalal Shakir
DM	14	(Iraq) Haitham Kadhim Jassim
CM	6	(Iraq) Ahmed Khalaf
CM	12	(Iraq) Haitham Abdul-Qadir	Substituted in
CF	7	(Iraq) Majeed Abdul-Ridha
CF	13	(Iraq) Kadhim Jabir
Manager:
(Iraq) Yahya Alwan

Umm al-Ma'arik Championship
1992–93 winner
Al-Talaba
1st title
