= Ahmed Mnajed =

Iraqi footballer

Personal information
- Full name: Ahmed Mnajed Abbas
- Date of birth: 13 December 1981 (age 44)
- Place of birth: Kirkuk, Iraq
- Height: 1.73 m (5 ft 8 in)
- Positions: Second striker; winger

Team information
- Current team: Erbil SC (Assist. Coach)

Senior career*
Years	Team	Apps	(Gls)
1999–2000	Al-Karkh	?	(?)
2000–2003	Al-Shorta	?	(?)
2003–2004	Al-Zawraa	?	(?)
2004–2006	Al-Riffa	?	(?)
2006–2008	Al-Ansar	48	(8)
2008	Al-Wahda	?	(?)
2008–2009	Al-Talaba	?	(?)
2009–2010	Al-Ansar	?	(?)
2010–2011	Duhok	?	(?)
2011–2012	Baghdad	?	(?)
2012–2013	Sulaymaniyah	15	(5)

International career^{‡}
2001–2010	Iraq	36	(10)

Managerial career
- 2020–2021: Erbil U19
- 2021: Erbil SC (Assist. Coach)
- 2021: Erbil SC (Caretaker)
- 2021–: Erbil SC (Assist. Coach)
Medal record
Men's football
Representing Iraq
AFC Asian Cup
Winner	2007 Indonesia/Malaysia/ Thailand/Vietnam
- * Club domestic league appearances and goals as of 11 February 2008 ‡ National team caps and goals as of 1 October 2010

Ahmed Mnajed Abbas (Arabic: أحمد مناجد عباس) (born 13 December 1981) is a former Iraqi footballer. He last played for Sulaymaniya FC in Iraq and the Iraq national football team. He usually played the second striker position.

== Biography ==
Ahmed Menajed was in the Iraq squad in the 2004 AFC Asian Cup, but he featured in only one game, coming on as a substitute against Turkmenistan. After the tournament, he moved from Al Zawra’a to Bahrain side Rifaa in October 2004. He spent two seasons in Bahrain before joining Lebanon's Al Ansar in August 2006, helping them to win their 13th Lebanon League title this year. He was brought into the Iraqi national team by Milan Zivadinovic, making his international debut as a half-time substitute in the 0–0 draw with Lebanon on January 31, 2001.

He played for Iraq at the 2004 Summer Olympics in Athens.

== Career statistics ==
=== International goals ===
Scores and results list Iraq's goal tally first.

No	Date	Venue	Opponent	Score	Result	Competition
1.	20 November 2002	Jassim Bin Hamad Stadium, Doha	Qatar	1–0	1–2	Friendly
2.	12 October 2003	Bukit Jalil Stadium, Kuala Lumpur	Myanmar	2–0	3–0	2004 AFC Asian Cup qualification
3.	12 December 2003	National Stadium, Manama	Bahrain	1–0	2–2	Friendly
4.	9 June 2004	King Abdullah Stadium, Amman	Chinese Taipei	4–0	6–1	2006 FIFA World Cup qualification
5.	9 June 2004	King Abdullah Stadium, Amman	Chinese Taipei	6–1	6–1	2006 FIFA World Cup qualification
6.	23 June 2004	Azadi Stadium, Tehran	Iran	1–1	1–2	2004 WAFF Championship
7.	8 June 2007	Amman International Stadium, Amman	Jordan	1–1	1–1	Friendly
8.	22 June 2007	Amman International Stadium, Amman	Syria	2–0	3–0	2007 WAFF Championship
9.	24 January 2008	Al-Rashid Stadium, Dubai	Jordan	1–0	1–1	Friendly
10.	21 September 2010	King Abdullah Stadium, Amman	Oman	3–2	3–2	Friendly

== Managerial statistics ==
As of match played 23 December 2021

Managerial record by team and tenure
Team	From	To	Record					Ref.
Team	From	To	P	W	D	L	Win %	Ref.
Erbil SC U-19	10 September 2020	""Present""	9	3	5	1	33.3	
Erbil SC (Caretaker)	11 December 2021	23 December 2021	2	0	0	2	0.0	
Total			11	3	5	3	27.3	—

== Honours ==
=== Club ===
Al-Shorta

- Baghdad Championship: 2000–01, 2001–02, 2002–03

Al-Riffa

- Bahraini FA Cup: 2004
- Bahraini Crown Prince Cup: 2004

Al-Ansar

- Lebanese Premier League: 2005–06, 2006–07
- Lebanese FA Cup: 2005–06, 2006–07, 2009–10

Duhok

- Iraqi Premier League: 2009–10

=== International ===
Iraq U20

- AFC Youth Championship: 2000

Iraq U23

- Summer Olympics fourth place: 2004

Iraq

- AFC Asian Cup: 2007
