= 1998–99 Iraqi Premier League =

Iraqi Premier League
- Season: 1998–99
- Champions: Al-Zawraa (8th title)
- Relegated: Al-Sulaikh
- 2000–01 Asian Club Championship: Al-Zawraa
- 2000–01 Asian Cup Winners' Cup: Al-Talaba
- Top goalscorer: Ahmed Khudhair; Hashim Ridha (19 goals each)

The 1998–99 Iraqi Premier League was the 25th season of the competition since its foundation in 1974. The league title was won by Al-Zawraa for the eighth time in their history. Had Al-Talaba beaten Al-Naft on the last day of the season, they would have won the league title instead, but the match finished goalless and Al-Zawraa's 3–1 win over Al-Karkh saw them claim the trophy. Al-Zawraa also won the Iraq FA Cup to complete the double.

== League table ==
| Pos | Team | Pld | W | D | L | GF | GA | GD | Pts | Qualification or relegation |
|---|---|---|---|---|---|---|---|---|---|---|
| 1 | Al-Zawraa (C) | 30 | 24 | 4 | 2 | 73 | 22 | +51 | 76 | 2000–01 Asian Club Championship |
| 2 | Al-Talaba | 30 | 24 | 3 | 3 | 71 | 25 | +46 | 75 | 2000–01 Asian Cup Winners' Cup (Note: Al-Talaba qualified for the Cup Winners' Cup as runners-up of the Iraq FA Cup, won by Al-Zawraa.) |
| 3 | Al-Quwa Al-Jawiya | 30 | 21 | 5 | 4 | 87 | 27 | +60 | 68 | |
| 4 | Al-Minaa | 30 | 14 | 8 | 8 | 35 | 29 | +6 | 50 | |
| 5 | Al-Shorta | 30 | 13 | 10 | 7 | 55 | 40 | +15 | 49 | |
| 6 | Al-Karkh | 30 | 11 | 12 | 7 | 42 | 32 | +10 | 45 | |
| 7 | Diyala | 30 | 10 | 12 | 8 | 37 | 39 | −2 | 42 | |
| 8 | Al-Najaf | 30 | 9 | 10 | 11 | 45 | 43 | +2 | 37 | |
| 9 | Duhok | 30 | 8 | 13 | 9 | 31 | 33 | −2 | 37 | |
| 10 | Al-Naft | 30 | 9 | 9 | 12 | 37 | 40 | −3 | 36 | |
| 11 | Samarra | 30 | 9 | 8 | 13 | 28 | 51 | −23 | 35 | |
| 12 | Al-Jaish | 30 | 9 | 4 | 17 | 25 | 43 | −18 | 31 | |
| 13 | Al-Kadhimiya | 30 | 7 | 8 | 15 | 42 | 62 | −20 | 29 | |
| 14 | Maysan | 30 | 6 | 4 | 20 | 25 | 63 | −38 | 22 | |
| 15 | Salahaddin | 30 | 6 | 3 | 21 | 27 | 67 | −40 | 21 | |
| 16 | Al-Sulaikh (R) | 30 | 2 | 3 | 25 | 17 | 61 | −44 | 9 | Relegation to the Iraqi Second Division League |

Source: Ali Al-Sabti Archive
(C) Champions; (R) Relegated

== Results ==
| Home \ Away | JSH | KDH | KAR | MIN | NFT | NJF | QWJ | SHR | SLK | TLB | ZWR | DYL | DHK | MYS | SAL | SMR |
|---|---|---|---|---|---|---|---|---|---|---|---|---|---|---|---|---|
| Al-Jaish | | 4–1 | 0–1 | 0–3 | 0–2 | 2–1 | 2–1 | 1–1 | 1–0 | 0–1 | 0–9 | 0–1 | 1–2 | 2–1 | 0–1 | 1–2 |
| Al-Kadhimiya | 1–0 | | 0–0 | 3–3 | 1–2 | 3–2 | 3–6 | 1–2 | 1–0 | 0–1 | 1–4 | 1–2 | 2–0 | 2–0 | 4–1 | 0–1 |
| Al-Karkh | 1–0 | 1–1 | | 2–2 | 1–1 | 1–0 | 4–2 | 2–1 | 3–1 | 0–1 | 1–3 | 1–1 | 1–0 | 6–2 | 4–0 | 1–1 |
| Al-Minaa | 1–1 | 1–1 | 1–0 | | 1–0 | 2–0 | 2–1 | 1–0 | 1–0 | 2–1 | 0–1 | 0–0 | 2–0 | 2–0 | 4–0 | 1–0 |
| Al-Naft | 0–2 | 2–3 | 0–0 | 0–2 | | 2–2 | 0–2 | 0–1 | 3–1 | 0–0 | 1–1 | 0–0 | 0–1 | 2–0 | 3–0 | 1–0 |
| Al-Najaf | 2–0 | 3–2 | 0–0 | 1–1 | 0–0 | | 0–3 | 1–1 | 1–0 | 3–4 | 1–2 | 2–2 | 3–0 | 2–0 | 2–1 | 4–0 |
| Al-Quwa Al-Jawiya | 2–0 | 5–1 | 3–2 | 6–0 | 2–1 | 3–1 | | 1–0 | 4–0 | 1–1 | 2–0 | 6–1 | 2–0 | 4–1 | 3–0 | 9–0 |
| Al-Shorta | 3–1 | 2–2 | 0–0 | 1–0 | 5–2 | 4–4 | 2–2 | | 2–0 | 1–3 | 1–5 | 1–2 | 1–1 | 4–2 | 3–1 | 2–1 |
| Al-Sulaikh | 1–2 | 1–1 | 1–2 | 0–2 | 1–3 | 0–1 | 0–3 | 0–4 | | 1–5 | 0–0 | 0–4 | 1–1 | 2–0 | 0–1 | 1–2 |
| Al-Talaba | 2–0 | 2–0 | 1–0 | 3–0 | 3–0 | 2–1 | 1–0 | 3–3 | 5–2 | | 1–3 | 2–0 | 2–1 | 2–0 | 6–1 | 3–0 |
| Al-Zawraa | 1–0 | 2–0 | 4–1 | 4–0 | 2–1 | 3–2 | 0–4 | 1–1 | 1–0 | 1–0 | | 4–1 | 1–1 | 3–0 | 3–1 | 2–1 |
| Diyala | 2–0 | 5–2 | 1–0 | 1–0 | 2–2 | 1–1 | 2–2 | 0–0 | 0–1 | 1–4 | 1–3 | | 1–2 | 2–2 | 0–0 | 2–0 |
| Duhok | 0–0 | 2–2 | 3–3 | 0–0 | 2–2 | 0–0 | 1–1 | 1–3 | 1–0 | 0–1 | 0–1 | 0–0 | | 1–0 | 6–1 | 1–0 |
| Maysan | 0–4 | 1–0 | 2–2 | 1–0 | 0–4 | 2–1 | 0–4 | 1–2 | 4–2 | 0–1 | 0–3 | 0–1 | 1–1 | | 1–0 | 1–2 |
| Salahaddin | 0–1 | 6–2 | 0–2 | 1–0 | 1–2 | 1–3 | 2–3 | 0–4 | 1–0 | 1–4 | 0–1 | 1–1 | 1–1 | 1–2 | | 3–1 |
| Samarra | 0–0 | 1–1 | 0–0 | 1–1 | 4–1 | 1–1 | 0–0 | 1–0 | 2–1 | 3–6 | 0–5 | 2–0 | 0–2 | 1–1 | 1–0 | |

Source: Ali Al-Sabti Archive
Legend: Blue = home team win; Yellow = draw; Red = away team win.

== Season statistics ==
=== Top scorers ===
| Pos | Scorer | Goals | Team |
|---|---|---|---|
| 1 | Ahmed Khudhair | 19 | Al-Quwa Al-Jawiya |
| 1 | Hashim Ridha | 19 | Al-Shorta |
| 3 | Husham Mohammed | 17 | Al-Zawraa |
| 3 | Abbas Rahim | 17 | Al-Karkh |
| 5 | Hussein Abdullah | 16 | Diyala |

=== Hat-tricks ===
| Player | For | Against | Result | Date |
|---|---|---|---|---|
| (Iraq) Karim Shaker | Al-Jaish | Al-Kadhimiya | 4–1 | 16 October 1998 |
| (Iraq) Mohanad Mahdi | Duhok | Salahaddin | 6–1 | 6 November 1998 |
| (Iraq) Razzaq Farhan^{5} | Al-Quwa Al-Jawiya | Samarra | 9–0 | 6 November 1998 |
| (Iraq) Razzaq Farhan | Al-Quwa Al-Jawiya | Al-Najaf | 3–1 | 19 November 1998 |
| (Iraq) Abbas Rahim | Al-Karkh | Al-Sulaikh | 3–1 | 19 February 1999 |
| (Iraq) Qahtan Chathir | Al-Talaba | Diyala | 4–1 | 5 March 1999 |
| (Iraq) Abbas Rahim^{4} | Al-Karkh | Maysan | 6–2 | 5 March 1999 |
| (Iraq) Waleed Dhahid | Al-Quwa Al-Jawiya | Al-Najaf | 3–0 | 19 March 1999 |
| (Iraq) Hashim Ridha | Al-Shorta | Al-Sulaikh | 4–0 | 31 March 1999 |

Notes

^{4} Player scored 4 goals
^{5} Player scored 5 goals
