= 8th Umm al-Ma'arik Championship =

Umm al-Ma'arik Championship
Tournament details
- Country: Iraq
- Dates: August 1998
- Teams: 8

Final positions
- Champions: Al-Quwa Al-Jawiya
- Runners-up: Al-Naft
- Third place: Al-Talaba
- Fourth place: Al-Minaa

Tournament statistics
- Top goal scorer(s): Akram Emmanuel; Habib Jafar (4 goals each)

The 8th Umm al-Ma'arik Championship (Arabic: بطولة أم المعارك الثامنة) was the eighth occurrence of the Baghdad Championship, organised by the Iraq Football Association. The top eight teams of the 1997–98 Iraqi Premier League competed in the tournament. In the final, held at Al-Shaab Stadium, Al-Quwa Al-Jawiya defeated Al-Naft 3–0.

== Group stage ==
=== Group 1 ===
Team	Pld	W	D	L	GF	GA	GD	Pts
Al-Talaba	3	2	1	0	4	2	+2	7
Al-Minaa	3	2	1	0	4	2	+2	7
Al-Shorta	3	0	1	2	1	3	−2	1
Al-Zawraa	3	0	1	2	1	3	−2	1

Notes

1. Al-Talaba finished in first place via a drawing of lots.

Al-Zawraa	1–2	Al-Minaa
Mohammed

Al-Talaba	2–1	Al-Shorta

Al-Talaba	1–0	Al-Zawraa

Al-Shorta	0–1	Al-Minaa

13 August 1998

Al-Shorta	0–0	Al-Zawraa

Al-Talaba	1–1	Al-Minaa

=== Group 2 ===
Team	Pld	W	D	L	GF	GA	GD	Pts
Al-Quwa Al-Jawiya	3	2	1	0	5	1	+4	7
Al-Naft	3	1	1	1	3	3	0	4
Al-Jaish	3	0	3	0	3	3	0	3
Al-Najaf	3	0	1	2	1	5	−4	1

Al-Quwa Al-Jawiya	2–0	Al-Najaf

Al-Naft	1–1	Al-Jaish

Al-Naft	2–0	Al-Najaf

Al-Quwa Al-Jawiya	1–1	Al-Jaish

Al-Jaish	1–1	Al-Najaf

Al-Quwa Al-Jawiya	2–0	Al-Naft

== Semifinals ==
Al-Minaa	1–4	Al-Quwa Al-Jawiya

Al-Naft	1–0 (a.e.t.)	Al-Talaba
Golden goal

== Third place match ==
Al-Minaa	1–3	Al-Talaba

== Final ==
Al-Naft	0–3	Al-Quwa Al-Jawiya
		Emmanuel; Farhan

Al-Shaab Stadium, Baghdad

Umm al-Ma'arik Championship
1998–99 winner
Al-Quwa Al-Jawiya
3rd title
