= Umm al-Ma'arik (disambiguation) =

Umm al-Ma'arik (Arabic: أم المعارك, lit. 'mother of all battles') was a name used to refer to the Gulf War by Iraqi officials.

Umm al-Ma'arik may also refer to:

- Umm al-Qura Mosque, which was formerly known as Umm al-Ma'arik Mosque
- Baghdad Championship, a football competition for clubs in Iraq which was formerly known as Umm al-Ma'arik Championship
