= 1st Umm al-Ma'arik Championship =

Tournament details
- Country: Iraq
- Dates: 2–13 September 1991
- Teams: 6

Final positions
- Champions: Al-Zawraa
- Runner-up: Al-Quwa Al-Jawiya
- Third place: Al-Talaba
- Fourth place: Al-Karkh

Tournament statistics
- Matches played: 10
- Goals scored: 24 (2.4 per match)
- Top goal scorer(s): Laith Hussein (4 goals)

Awards
- Best player: Laith Hussein

The 1st Umm al-Ma'arik Championship (Arabic: بطولة أم المعارك الأولى) was the first occurrence of the Baghdad Championship. This edition of the competition was organised by Al-Talaba. The top six teams of the 1990–91 Iraqi National League were supposed to compete in the tournament, but Al-Naft withdrew from the competition and were replaced by seventh-placed Al-Najaf. All the matches were played at Al-Shaab Stadium. The competition started on 2 September and ended on 13 September where, in the final, Al-Zawraa defeated Al-Quwa Al-Jawiya 3–1 after extra time.

== Background ==
Al-Talaba proposed the establishing of a new tournament that includes only the top six teams of the 1990–91 Iraqi National League: Al-Zawraa, Al-Talaba, Al-Shorta, Al-Karkh, Al-Quwa Al-Jawiya and Al-Naft. Salim Rasheed, the vice president of Al-Talaba, stated that the competition would be played at Al-Shaab Stadium and in two groups. The Iraq Football Association agreed on the proposition on 24 August 1991.

The higher organizing committee of the competition held a meeting with the participating teams' representatives and the FA's representatives at Al-Talaba's headquarters on 25 August 1991 to discuss the start and end dates of the tournament and other technical matters. The duration of the competition was decided to be from 2–13 September 1991 and 31 August would be the last day to receive squad lists. Before the start of the tournament, Al-Naft did not accept the invitation, so they were replaced by Al-Najaf, the seventh-placed team of the league.

== Pre-opening ==
The organizing committee invited 41 former national players, organizing a charity match between them, but only 24 got to play. The players were split into two teams. The green team included Jalal Abdul-Rahman, Muthanna Hameed, Saadi Toma, Shakir Ali, Falah Hassan, Ali Kadhim, Hadi Al-Janabi, Hassan Saddawi, Sabah Hatim, Ayoub Odisho, Abdelilah Abdul-Wahid and Jaleel Salih, while the white team consisted of Kadhim Khalaf, Samir Shaker, Ibrahim, Wathiq Aswad, Abdul-Zahra Aswad, Hussein Saeed, Haris Mohammed, Thair Ahmed, Mahdi Jassim, Faisal Aziz, Abdul-Karim Farhan and Abdul-Muhsin Mohammed. It ended in a 4–1 win for to the green team.

== Group stage ==
The matches were drawn on 29 August 1991.

=== Group 1 ===
Team	Pld	W	D	L	GF	GA	GD	Pts
Al-Quwa Al-Jawiya	2	2	0	0	2	0	+2	4
Al-Talaba	2	1	0	1	1	1	0	2
Al-Shorta	2	0	0	2	0	2	−2	0

2 September 1991
14:00 GMT

Al-Talaba	1–0	Al-Shorta
Jabbar 41' (pen.)

Al-Shaab Stadium, Baghdad
Referee: Abbas Abdul-Rahman
4 September 1991
14:00 GMT

Al-Quwa Al-Jawiya	1–0	Al-Shorta
Fadhil 76'

Al-Shaab Stadium, Baghdad
Referee: Tariq Ahmed
6 September 1991
14:00 GMT

Al-Talaba	0–1 (a.e.t.)	Al-Quwa Al-Jawiya
		Yassir 91'

Al-Shaab Stadium, Baghdad
Referee: Ghalib Abdul-Kadhim

=== Group 2 ===
Team	Pld	W	D	L	GF	GA	GD	Pts
Al-Zawraa	2	2	0	0	5	0	+5	4
Al-Karkh	2	1	0	1	4	2	+2	2
Al-Najaf	2	0	0	2	1	8	−7	0

3 September 1991
14:00 GMT

Al-Zawraa	1–0	Al-Karkh
Hussein 21'

Al-Shaab Stadium, Baghdad
Referee: Mohameed Saleem
5 September 1991
14:00 GMT

Al-Karkh	4–1	Al-Najaf
Daham 21'; Allawi 36'; Abdul-Kadhim 75'; Khalaf 80'		Najim 12'

Al-Shaab Stadium, Baghdad
Referee: Tariq Thar Hani
7 September 1991
14:00 GMT

Al-Zawraa	4–0	Al-Najaf
Hussein 28', 55'; Saddam 43'; Mahdi 64'

Al-Shaab Stadium, Baghdad
Referee: Adil Al-Qassab

== Semifinals ==
9 September 1991
14:30 GMT

Al-Quwa Al-Jawiya	2–0	Al-Karkh
Shenaishil 48' (pen.); Emmanuel 57'

Al-Shaab Stadium, Baghdad
Referee: Subhi Raheem
10 September 1991
14:30 GMT

Al-Zawraa	1–0	Al-Talaba
Mahdi 5'

Al-Shaab Stadium, Baghdad
Referee: Abdul-Karim Saadi

== Third place match ==
12 September 1991
14:30 GMT

Al-Karkh	2–2 (a.e.t.)	Al-Talaba
Ali 70'; Mitib 96'		Hussein 55'; Kadhim 120'
Penalties
Allawi (penalty scored); Khalaf (penalty scored); Yasin (penalty missed); Mutaab (penalty missed); Haider (penalty scored)	3–4	(penalty scored) Jabbar; (penalty scored) Shakir; (penalty missed) Bakhit; (penalty scored) Kadhim; (penalty scored) Jafar

Al-Shaab Stadium, Baghdad
Referee: Tariq Ahmed

== Final ==
13 September 1991
14:30 GMT

Al-Zawraa	3–1 (a.e.t.)	Al-Quwa Al-Jawiya
Saddam 18'; Hussein 91'; Radhi 93'		Abdul-Hameed 80' (pen.)

Al-Shaab Stadium, Baghdad
Referee: Salah Mohammed

Umm al-Ma'arik Championship
1991–92 winner
Al-Zawraa
1st title
