= 2010–11 Al-Talaba SC season =

Al Talaba
Iraqi Premier League season
- Chairman: Alaa Kadhim
- Manager: Yahya Alwan
- Ground: Al Karkh Stadium
- Iraqi Premier League: 8th South group
- AFC Cup: 3rd Group D
- Top goalscorer: League: Said Mohsen (6); All: Said Mohsen (7)
Home colours	Away colours

The 2010-11 is Al Talaba's 36th season in the Iraqi Premier League. Al Talaba will competing in the Iraqi Premier League and in the AFC Cup.

== Squad ==
Note: Flags indicate national team as defined under FIFA eligibility rules; some limited exceptions apply. Players may hold more than one non-FIFA nationality.

No.	Pos.	Nation	Player
1	GK	(Iraq) IRQ	Ali Hussein
2	DF	(Iraq) IRQ	Alaaeldin rhaimah
3	DF	(Iraq) IRQ	Majid Hamid
4	DF	(Iraq) IRQ	AhmAd Abdul-Majid
6	MF	(Iraq) IRQ	Aqeel Hussein
7	MF	(Iraq) IRQ	Haider Azzam
8	FW	(Iraq) IRQ	Mussa Sattar
9	FW	(Iraq) IRQ	Mohammed Abd Jdayia
10	FW	(Iraq) IRQ	Abdul-Salam Abood
11	MF	(Iraq) IRQ	Ahmad Hasan
12	GK	(Iraq) IRQ	Ali Mutashar
13	DF	(Iraq) IRQ	Ayad Khalaf
14	MF	(Iraq) IRQ	Nawaf Sallal
15	MF	(Iraq) IRQ	Ahmed jasem
17	FW	(Iraq) IRQ	Karrar Tariq
18	FW	(Iraq) IRQ	Mohammed Abdul Hasan
20	MF	(Iraq) IRQ	Fareed Majeed
21	GK	(Iraq) IRQ	Ahmed Jabar
22	MF	(Iraq) IRQ	Fawzi Abdul Sada
23	FW	(Iraq) IRQ	Ali Jaber
24	FW	(Iraq) IRQ	Aqeel Mohammed
25	MF	(Iraq) IRQ	Aqeel Abbas
26	MF	(Iraq) IRQ	Thamer Fouad
27	DF	(Iraq) IRQ	Amjad Naeem
—	MF	(Iraq) IRQ	Mohanaad Ghalib
—	MF	(Iraq) IRQ	Abdul-Wahab Abu Al-Hail
—	DF	(Iraq) IRQ	Dara Mohammed
—	DF	(Iraq) IRQ	Salam Muhsen

No.	Pos.	Nation	Player
—	DF	(Iraq) IRQ	Abbas Rehema
—	MF	(Iraq) IRQ	Abbas Jaafar
—	MF	(Iraq) IRQ	Abuallah Suheel
—	MF	(Iraq) IRQ	Alaa Qasem
—	MF	(Iraq) IRQ	Amjed Husain
—	MF	(Iraq) IRQ	Eihab Kadhum
—	MF	(Iraq) IRQ	Haidar Abdul-Qader
—	MF	(Iraq) IRQ	Karim Walem
—	MF	(Iraq) IRQ	Qusai Hashim
—	MF	(Iraq) IRQ	Raad Hamoodi
—	MF	(Iraq) IRQ	Said Mohsen
—	MF	(Iraq) IRQ	Salar Abdul Jabbar
—	MF	(Iraq) IRQ	Wisam Torgy
—	FW	(Iraq) IRQ	Ahmed Hannon
—	FW	(Iraq) IRQ	Ahmed Khodair
—	FW	(Iraq) IRQ	Alaaldin Ghazi
—	FW	(Iraq) IRQ	Ali Jassim
—	FW	(Iraq) IRQ	Hassan Jabbar
—	FW	(Iraq) IRQ	Jasem Mohamed
—	FW	(Iraq) IRQ	Muhammed Abdul Hasan
—	FW	(Iraq) IRQ	Mustafa Basel
—	FW	(Iraq) IRQ	Raad Magtuf

== Transfers ==
=== In ===
Date	Pos.	Name	From	Fee
September 2010	MF	(Iraq) Najaf FC	(Iraq) Abbas Rehema	-
September 2010	MF	(Iraq) Karbalaa FC	(Iraq) Karim Walem	
September 2010	DF	(Iraq) Arbil FC	(Iraq) Dara Mohammed	-
September 2010	FW	(Iraq) Nassriya FC	(Iraq) Jasem Muhammed	-
September 2010	DF	(Iraq) Baghdad FC	(Iraq) Haidar Aboodi	-
September 2010	FW	(Iraq) Al-Quwa Al-Jawiya	(Iraq) Ahmad Hannon	-
September 2010	DF	(Iraq) Al-Minaa	(Iraq) Salam Muhsen	-
September 2010	MF	(Iraq) Dohuk FC	(Iraq) Salar Abdul-Jabar	-
September 2010	FW	(Iraq) Al-Hassasin	(Iraq) Hassan Jabbar	-
September 2010	DF	(Iraq) Al-Quwa Al-Jawiya	(Iraq) Muayad Khalid	-
September 2010	MF	(Iraq) Najaf FC	(Iraq) Said Mohsen	-

=== Out ===
Date	Pos.	From	Club	Fee
September 2010	MF	(Iraq) Dohuk FC	(Iraq) Nadim Karim	-

== Competitions ==
=== Iraqi Premier League ===
Pos	Team	Pld	W	D	L	GF	GA	GD	Pts	Qualification or relegation
6	Al-Najaf	26	11	9	6	34	20	+14	42	
7	Masafi Al-Wasat	26	12	5	9	22	28	−6	41	
8	Al-Talaba	26	9	11	6	33	25	+8	38	
9	Naft Al-Junoob	26	9	10	7	28	24	+4	37	Relegated to the Iraqi First Division League
10	Naft Maysan	26	6	7	13	20	29	−9	25	Relegated to the Iraqi First Division League

Source: Goalzz

==== Matches ====
26 November 2010 1	Al Talaba	0 – 0	Al-Quwa Al-Jawiya	Baghdad
11:30 GMT				Stadium: Al Sina'a Stadium

4 December 2010 2	Al-Hindiya	1 – 2	Al Talaba	Al-Hindiya
11:00 GMT	57'		Karim Walem 82'; Jasem Mohammed 91'

10 December 2010 3	Al Talaba	1 – 0	Nassriya FC	Baghdad
11:30 GMT	Haidar Aboodi 87'			Stadium: Al Karkh Stadium

20 December 2010 4	Al Talaba	2 – 2	Naft Maysan	Baghdad
11:30 GMT	Muayid Khalid 22'; Nawaf Sallal 28'		Amjed Hameed 7'; 72'	Stadium: Al Karkh Stadium

24 December 2010 5	Al-Hassasin	0 – 1	Al Talaba	Baghdad
11:30 GMT			Hassan Jabar 84'

31 December 2010 6	Najaf FC	4 – 1	Al Talaba	Najaf
11:00 GMT	Mustafa Nadhem 5'; Deiaa Faleh 41'; Hussein Kareem 55'; Suheil Naeem 63'		Aqeel Mohammed 91'	Stadium: An Najaf Stadium

7 January 2011 7	Al Talaba	1 – 1	Al-Masafi	Baghdad
11:30 GMT	Said Mohsen 65'		Asaad Abdul Nabi 15'	Stadium: Al Karkh Stadium

14 January 2011 8	Naft Al Janoob	3 – 3	Al Talaba	Nasiriyah
11:00 GMT	Ali Jawad 22', 50'; Aamer Saheb 66'		Abdul-Wahab Abu Al-Hail 60'; Said Mohsen 79'; Haidar Aboodi 85'	Stadium: An Nasiriyah Stadium

31 January 2011 9	Al Talaba	0 – 0	Al Zawraa	Baghdad
11:30 GMT				Stadium: Al Karkh Stadium

4 February 2011 10	Al Talaba	4 – 2	Al-Minaa	Baghdad
11:30 GMT	Said Mohsen 28'; Abbas Qasem 56'; Hassan Jabbar 74'; Abdul-Wahab Abu Al-Hail 86'		Husam Ibrahim 58', 78'	Stadium: Al Karkh Stadium

11 February 2011 11	Al-Diwaniya FC	0 – 1	Al Talaba	Diwaniya
11:00 GMT			Salar Abdul Jabbar 45'	Stadium: Al Diwaniya Stadium

18 February 2011 12	Baghdad FC	0 – 0	Al Talaba	Baghdad
11:30 GMT				Stadium: Baghdad Stadium

24 February 2011 13	Al Talaba	2 – 2	Karbalaa FC	Baghdad
11:30 GMT	Abdul-Salam Abboud 7'; Said Mohsen 30'		Mohammed Hadi 55'; Karrar Abd Yaser 78'	Stadium: Al Karkh Stadium

9 March 2011 14	Al-Quwa Al-Jawiya	2 – 1	Al Talaba	Baghdad
11:30 GMT	Amjad Radhi 41'; Razzag Farhan 78'		Abdul-Salam Abboud 47'	Stadium: Al-Quwa Al-Jawiya Stadium

22 March 2011 15	Al Talaba	3 – 0	Al-Hindiya	Baghdad
12:00 GMT	Jasem Mohammed 48'; Nawaf Sallal 75'; Karim Walem 78'			Stadium: Al Karkh Stadium

28 March 2011 16	Nasiriya FC	0 – 0	Al Talaba	Nasiriya
12:00 GMT				Stadium: Nasiriya Stadium

4 April 2011 17	Naft Maysan	0 – 2	Al Talaba	Amarah
12:00 GMT				Stadium: Maysan Stadium

20 April 2011 18	Al Talaba	0 – 0	Najaf FC	Baghdad
12:30 GMT				Stadium: Al Karkh Stadium

21 May 2011 19	Al Talaba	6 – 0	Al-Hasanain	Baghdad
12:30 GMT				Stadium: Al Karkh Stadium

27 May 2011 20	Al-Masafi	1 – 0	Al Talaba	Baghdad
12:00 GMT				Stadium: Al-Masafi Stadium

31 May 2011 21	Al Talaba	1 – 1	Naft Al Janoob	Baghdad
13:30 GMT				Stadium: Al Karkh Stadium

6 June 2011 22	Al-Zawraa	2 – 0	Al Talaba	Baghdad
14:00 GMT				Stadium: Al Zawraa Stadium

11 June 2011 23	Al Talaba	1 – 1	Al-Diwaniya FC	Baghdad
14:00 GMT				Stadium: Al Karkh Stadium

=== AFC Cup ===
==== Group D ====
Team	Pld	W	D	L	GF	GA	GD	Pts	WEH	KUW	TAL	SUW
(Jordan) Al-Wehdat	6	4	2	0	11	3	+8	14		1–0	0–0	5–1
Al-Kuwait	6	3	1	2	7	6	+1	10	1–3		1–0	0–0
(Iraq) Al-Talaba	6	1	2	3	4	6	−2	5	0–1	1–2		1–1
(Oman) Al-Suwaiq	6	0	3	3	5	12	−7	3	1–1	1–3	1–2	

2 March 2011
14:30 UTC+03:00

Al-Talaba (Iraq)	0 – 1	(Jordan) Al-Wehdat
	Report	Abu Taima 64'

Franso Hariri Stadium, Arbil
Attendance: 3,000
Referee: Salah Al-Abbasi (Bahrain)
