= 4th Umm al-Ma'arik Championship =

Umm al-Ma'arik Championship
Tournament details
- Country: Iraq
- Dates: 15–26 September 1994
- Teams: 8

Final positions
- Champions: Al-Quwa Al-Jawiya
- Runner-up: Al-Talaba
- Third place: Al-Zawraa
- Fourth place: Al-Najaf

Tournament statistics
- Top goal scorer(s): Sahib Abbas (6 goals)

The 4th Umm al-Ma'arik Championship (Arabic: بطولة أم المعارك الرابعة) was the fourth occurrence of the Baghdad Championship, organised by the Iraq Football Association. The top eight teams of the 1993–94 Iraqi National League competed in the tournament. The competition started on 15 September 1994 and ended on 26 September 1994 where, in the final, held at Al-Shaab Stadium, Al-Quwa Al-Jawiya defeated Al-Talaba 4–3 on penalties after a 0–0 draw.

== Group stage ==
=== Group 1 ===
Team	Pld	W	D	L	GF	GA	GD	Pts
Al-Zawraa	3	2	1	0	7	4	+3	7
Al-Talaba	3	1	1	1	6	6	0	4
Al-Shorta	3	0	3	0	6	6	0	3
Salahaddin	3	0	1	2	3	6	−3	1

Al-Zawraa	2–0	Salahaddin
Abbas (pen.)

Al-Talaba	2–2	Al-Shorta

Al-Zawraa	2–2	Al-Shorta
Majeed; Abbas

Al-Talaba	2–1	Salahaddin

Salahaddin	2–2	Al-Shorta

Al-Zawraa	3–2	Al-Talaba
Majeed; Khalaf; Abbas (pen.)

=== Group 2 ===
Team	Pld	W	D	L	GF	GA	GD	Pts
Al-Quwa Al-Jawiya	3	2	1	0	4	2	+2	7
Al-Najaf	3	2	0	1	8	4	+4	6
Al-Naft	3	1	1	1	4	5	−1	4
Al-Jaish	3	0	0	3	2	7	−5	0

Al-Quwa Al-Jawiya	1–1	Al-Naft

Al-Jaish	1–4	Al-Najaf

Al-Quwa Al-Jawiya	1–0	Al-Najaf

Al-Jaish	0–1	Al-Naft

Al-Naft	2–4	Al-Najaf

Al-Quwa Al-Jawiya	2–1	Al-Jaish

== Semifinals ==
23 September 1994

Al-Quwa Al-Jawiya	1–0	Al-Zawraa
Dhahid

Al-Najaf	0–1	Al-Talaba

== Third place match ==
Al-Zawraa	2–1	Al-Najaf
Abbas (pen.)

== Final ==
26 September 1994

Al-Quwa Al-Jawiya	0–0 (a.e.t.)	Al-Talaba
Penalties
Jabir (penalty scored); Khalaf (penalty scored); Dhahid (penalty scored); Hashim (penalty scored)	4–3	(penalty scored) Jabbar; (penalty scored) Zaidan; (penalty scored) Lewis; (penalty missed) Saddam; (penalty missed) Kareem

Al-Shaab Stadium, Baghdad

Umm al-Ma'arik Championship
1994–95 winner
Al-Quwa Al-Jawiya
1st title
