= 3rd Umm al-Ma'arik Championship =

Umm al-Ma'arik Championship
Tournament details
- Country: Iraq
- Dates: 15–24 September 1993
- Teams: 6

Final positions
- Champions: Al-Talaba
- Runner-up: Al-Quwa Al-Jawiya
- Third place: Al-Zawraa
- Fourth place: Al-Karkh

Tournament statistics
- Top goal scorer(s): Akram Emmanuel (3 goals)

Awards
- Best player: Hamza Hadi

The 3rd Umm al-Ma'arik Championship (Arabic: بطولة أم المعارك الثالثة) was the third occurrence of the Baghdad Championship, organised by the Iraq Football Association. The top six teams of the 1992–93 Iraqi National League competed in the tournament. The competition started on 15 September 1993 and ended on 24 September 1993 where, in the final, held at Al-Shaab Stadium, Al-Talaba defeated Al-Quwa Al-Jawiya 2–1.

== Group stage ==
=== Group 1 ===
Team	Pld	W	D	L	GF	GA	GD	Pts
Al-Quwa Al-Jawiya	2	1	1	0	3	1	+2	3
Al-Talaba	2	0	2	0	2	2	0	2
Al-Jaish	2	0	1	1	1	3	−2	1

Al-Quwa Al-Jawiya	2–0	Al-Jaish

Al-Talaba	1–1	Al-Jaish

Al-Quwa Al-Jawiya	1–1	Al-Talaba

=== Group 2 ===
Team	Pld	W	D	L	GF	GA	GD	Pts
Al-Zawraa	2	1	0	1	6	3	+3	2
Al-Karkh	2	1	0	1	2	2	0	2
Al-Shorta	2	1	0	1	2	5	−3	2

Al-Zawraa	5–1	Al-Shorta
Mahdi; Khalaf; Abdul-Hussein; Hameed (o.g)

Al-Karkh	2–1	Al-Zawraa
		Abbas

Al-Shorta	1–0	Al-Karkh

== Semifinals ==
Al-Quwa Al-Jawiya	1–0	Al-Karkh

Al-Zawraa	1–3	Al-Talaba
Abdul-Sattar

== Third place match ==
Al-Zawraa	1–0	Al-Karkh
Khalaf

== Final ==
24 September 1993

Al-Quwa Al-Jawiya	1–2	Al-Talaba
Emmanuel		Awda; Yassir

Al-Shaab Stadium, Baghdad

Umm al-Ma'arik Championship
1993–94 winner
Al-Talaba
2nd title
