= 5th Umm al-Ma'arik Championship =

Umm al-Ma'arik Championship
Tournament details
- Country: Iraq
- Dates: February 1996
- Teams: 8

Final positions
- Champions: Al-Talaba
- Runner-up: Al-Quwa Al-Jawiya
- Third place: Al-Zawraa
- Fourth place: Al-Naft

Tournament statistics
- Top goal scorer(s): Muayad Judi (5 goals)

The 5th Umm al-Ma'arik Championship (Arabic: بطولة أم المعارك الخامسة) was the fifth occurrence of the Baghdad Championship, organised by the Iraq Football Association. The top eight teams of the 1994–95 Iraqi National League competed in the tournament. In the final, held at Al-Shaab Stadium, Al-Talaba defeated Al-Quwa Al-Jawiya 1–0.

== Group stage ==
=== Group 1 ===
Team	Pld	W	D	L	GF	GA	GD	Pts
Al-Zawraa	3	1	2	0	2	0	+2	5
Al-Naft	3	0	3	0	1	1	0	3
Al-Karkh	3	0	3	0	0	0	0	3
Al-Najaf	3	0	2	1	1	3	−2	2

Al-Zawraa	0–0	Al-Naft

Al-Najaf	0–0	Al-Karkh

Al-Zawraa	0–0	Al-Karkh

Al-Najaf	1–1	Al-Naft

Al-Karkh	0–0	Al-Naft

Al-Zawraa	2–0	Al-Najaf
Abbas; Majeed

=== Group 2 ===
Team	Pld	W	D	L	GF	GA	GD	Pts
Al-Quwa Al-Jawiya	3	3	0	0	9	1	+8	9
Al-Talaba	3	2	0	1	7	5	+2	6
Al-Shorta	3	1	0	2	6	11	−5	3
Al-Jaish	3	0	0	3	2	7	−5	0

Al-Shorta	2–4	Al-Talaba

Al-Quwa Al-Jawiya	1–0	Al-Jaish

Al-Quwa Al-Jawiya	2–1	Al-Talaba
Tariq; Dhahid		Mohammed

Al-Shorta	4–1	Al-Jaish

Al-Quwa Al-Jawiya	6–0	Al-Shorta
Kadhim; Khayoun; Omran; Assem; Swadi

Al-Jaish	1–2	Al-Talaba

== Semifinals ==
Al-Quwa Al-Jawiya	2–1 (a.e.t.)	Al-Naft
Kadhim		Goal

8 February 1996

Al-Zawraa	0–1	Al-Talaba
		Judi (penalty missed) , Jaber (penalty missed)

Al-Shaab Stadium, Baghdad

== Third place match ==
Al-Zawraa	3–0	Al-Naft
Abbas; Abdul-Latif

== Final ==
Al-Quwa Al-Jawiya	0–1	Al-Talaba
Dhahid (penalty missed)		Al-Hail (pen.)

Al-Shaab Stadium, Baghdad

Umm al-Ma'arik Championship
1995–96 winner
Al-Talaba
3rd title
