= Iraq national student football team =

National association football team

Iraq School Team
- Association: Ministry of Education; Iraq Football Association
- FIFA code: IRQ
First colours	Second colours	Third colours

Pan Arab School Games
- Appearances: N/A
- Best result: Champions 2, 2006, 2010

Iraq national school football team is a team representing Iraq in the schools competitions.

== Pan Arab School Games Record ==
Recent Pan Arab School Games editions record.

Pan Arab School Games
Year	Result	GP	W	D*	L	GS	GA
(Algeria) 16th Edition - 2006	Champions	5	4	1	14	4	0
(Jordan) 17th Edition - 2008	4th Place	6	3	1	2	10	6
(Lebanon) 18th Edition - 2010	Champions	5	3	1	1	6	4
(Kuwait) 19th Edition - 2013	Group C - 3rd Place	3	1	1	1	5	3
