= Dara Mohammed =

Iraqi footballer

Dara Mohammed Habib
Personal information
- Full name: Dara Mohammed Habib
- Date of birth: 25 June 1987 (age 39)
- Place of birth: Kirkuk, Iraq
- Height: 1.82 m (6 ft 0 in)
- Positions: Left-back; left wing-back

Senior career*
Years	Team	Apps	(Gls)
2005–2007	Sulaymaniyah		
2007–2008	Erbil		
2008–2009	Sulaymaniyah		
2009–2010	Al-Quwa Al-Jawiya		
2010–2011	Peshmarga		
2010–2011	Al-Talaba		
2011–2013	Peshmarga		
2013–2018	Kirkuk		

International career
2009–2010	Iraq	1	(0)
- * Club domestic league appearances and goals

Dara Mohammed Habib (Arabic: دارا محمد حبيب; born June 25, 1987) is an Iraqi football player of Kurdish ethnicity, who played at the 2009 FIFA Confederations Cup.

== Info ==
Dara Mohammed, who turns 22 on 19 June, raised quite a few eyebrows when he earned a place in Iraq's FIFA Confederations Cup squad in preference to many of the country's seasoned full-backs. Yet despite his youth, few question that he has the potential to develop into one of the nation's most dependable defenders. Born in 1987 in Kirkuk in the north-east of Iraq, the Kurdish player has spent his relatively short career with two regional clubs. After spending a couple of seasons with Sulaymaniyah FC, where he announced his emergence as a promising star, he quickly earned a lucrative contract with Iraqi giants Erbil FC in 2007.

His stint with Erbil FC proved short, but it was impressive nonetheless as he won his first national league title in his first and only season with the club. The next season saw him come full circle, returning to Sulaymaniyah FC, with whom he has remained until this day.

Having thrived at left-back position on the domestic scene, Mohammed was charged with the task of shoring up Iraq's defence during the qualifying campaign for the Men's Olympic Football Tournament at Beijing 2008. His reward for some solid showings at that level was a call-up to the Iraqi senior team for 2010 FIFA World Cup South Africa qualifier against Pakistan, and now a place at the Festival of Champions in South Africa.

== Personal life ==
On 17 March 2018, it was reported that Dara is suffering from cancer.
