= Hashim Ridha =

Iraqi footballer and manager

Hashim Ridha Mohammed Alwan Wazni
Personal information
- Date of birth: 18 May 1979 (age 47)
- Place of birth: Karbala, Iraq
- Position: Striker

Team information
- Current team: Al-Shorta SC (Team supervisor)

Youth career
- –1993: Shabab Saad
- 1993–1996: Karbala

Senior career*
Years	Team	Apps	(Gls)
1996–1998	Karbala		(24)
1998–2002	Al-Shorta		(82)
1999–2000	→ Al-Zawraa (loan)		(0)
2000	→ Al-Talaba (loan)		(0)
2001	→ Al-Zawraa (loan)		(0)
2002–2003	Al-Shamal		(7)
2003	Karbala		(0)
2003–2009	Al-Shorta		(16)
2007	→ Karbala (loan)		(3)
2009–2010	Karbala		(6)
2010–2011	Al-Shorta		(1)
2011–2013	Karbala		(2)
Total		-	(141)

International career
2002	Iraq	2	(1)

Managerial career
- 2016: Al-Shorta (Caretaker)
- * Club domestic league appearances and goals as of 31 August 2013

Hashim Ridha Mohammed Alwan Wazni (Arabic: هَاشِم رِضَا مُحَمَّد عَلْوَان وَزْنِيّ, born May 18, 1979, in Karbala, Iraq) is an Iraqi former footballer who played for Al-Shorta. He was nicknamed 'The Rocket' by Al-Shorta fans when he was a player.

== Club career ==
Hashim Ridha was a natural goalscorer, deadly around the six-yard box. He started his career at Karbala FC. He started his football career joining the Karbala junior team in 1993. In 1998, he earned a move to Al-Shorta. There he finished as joint top scorer of the 1998/99 season, scoring 19 goals and winning both the best striker and best young player awards. He also scored 14 goals in the 1998/99 Iraq FA Cup, which is the record for the most goals that a player has scored in a single Iraq FA Cup tournament. He was part of the Iraqi Olympic team that failed to qualify for the 2000 Olympic games in Sydney, after losing 5–0 to Jordan, a few days after beating the same team 4–2. After his Olympic disappointments, Hashim was given his first call up to the national team by Najih Humoud during the International Friendly Tournament in 1999, he also was called up by Milan Zivadinovic into the 2000 Asian Cup squad but was one of the players that missed out of a place in Lebanon. In the 2001/02 season, after loan spells at Al-Zawraa and Al-Talaba, he bagged a mighty 32 goals for Al-Shorta and finished as top scorer of the Iraqi Premier League for the second time in his career. He helped Al-Shorta to win three Umm Al Maarek Cup (Mother of All Battles Cup)'s in a row but a recurring injury kept keeping him out of games. He then moved to a professional club, Qatari club Al-Shamal in the 2002/03 season. He scored seven goals for them in that season, the third highest amount in the league. He was one of the best players in the 2004 Algomhuria International Cup when he returned to Al-Shorta and Al-Shorta finished 4th in the tournament. He left the club on loan to join his hometown club Karbala FC where he scored three goals in the 2006/07 season. He returned to Al-Shorta in 2007/08, scoring three more goals for the club, and then moved back to Karbala in 2009. He scored six goals for Karbala in the 2009/10 season and then moved back to Al-Shorta for the 2010/11 season in which he was the captain of his club. He scored one goal in that season against Ramadi FC and then made his last career move, returning to play for Karbala for the fourth time in his career. After adding another two goals to his long list of career goals in the 2011/12 season, Hashim decided to retire at the age of 34 and as one of the deadliest Iraqi strikers of all time, and he is one of Al Shorta's most legendary players. He had a retirement ceremony at Al Shaab Stadium before Al Shorta took on Al Zawraa (two of his former clubs) in a league match on 31 August 2013.

== International Debut ==
On January 11, 2002, Hashim made his debut for Iraq against Oman in a friendly match. He scored in the fourth minute of the match and his country went on to win the match 2–0. His second and final Iraq cap came two days later in a 3–1 win against Qatar. He didn't make any more appearances for Iraq, and he stated that the reason for this was because coaches used to 'choose the players closest to them' and because of an injury that reduced his opportunities of playing for Iraq.

== International goals ==
=== Iraq national football team goals ===
Scores and results list Iraq's goal tally first.

#	Date	Venue	Opponent	Score	Result	Competition
1.	January 11, 2002	Saud Bin Abdul-Rahman Stadium, Doha, Qatar	Oman	1–0	2–0	Friendly Match

== After retirement ==
Hashim Ridha became Al-Shorta's administrative director for the 2013–14 season in a role that he had never had any experience in, and said that the reason he decided to take this job was for the experience but also because he wanted to help his favourite club Al-Shorta in any way possible.

Also, on 26 April 2014, Hashim Ridha took part in a special charity match played between Al-Shorta and Samawa FC. The match finished 1-1. Ali Bahjat scored Al-Shorta's goal with a free kick and Mohammed Hassan got the goal for Samawa. Hashim scored a goal for Al-Shorta in the game but it was ruled out for offside.

He confirmed he would be continuing his role as administrative director into the 2014–15 season and also became the team supervisor that season, sitting alongside head coach Mohamed Youssef on the bench for each game. In the 2015–16 season he became the assistant manager of the club and became the manager after the resignation of Radhi Shenaishil.

== Honours ==
=== Clubs ===
Al-Shorta

- 10th Umm al-Ma'arik Championship: Winner
- 11th Umm al-Ma'arik Championship: Winner
- 2001–02 Iraq FA Cup: Runner-up
- 12th Umm al-Ma'arik Championship: Winner

Al-Zawraa

- 1999–2000 Asian Cup Winners' Cup: Runner-up

=== Individual ===
- 1998–99 Iraqi Premier League: Top scorer (19 goals)
- 1998–99 Iraq FA Cup: Top scorer (14 goals, record)
- 2001–02 Iraqi Premier League: Top scorer (32 goals)

== Personal life ==
Hashim is married and has a daughter named Wadaq. His brother Hussein Ridha played with him at both Karbala and Al-Shorta.
