= Adnan Mohammad Hassb =

Iraqi footballer

Personal information
- Date of birth: 10 July 1973 (age 53)
- Place of birth: Iraq
- Position: Midfielder

Senior career*
Years	Team	Apps	(Gls)
–	Al-Jaish SC	-	(-)
–	Al-Zawra'a SC	-	(-)
–	Tishreen SC	-	(-)
–	Omayya SC	-	(-)
–	Shabab Al-Sahel	-	(-)

International career
1999-2000	Iraq	4	(0)
- * Club domestic league appearances and goals

Adnan Mohammad Hassb is an Iraqi football midfielder who played for the Iraq in the 2000 Asian Cup.
