= Ahmed Khudhair =

Iraqi footballer & coach (born 1975)

Personal information
- Full name: Ahmed Khudhair
- Date of birth: 23 May 1975 (age 51)
- Place of birth: Baghdad, Iraq
- Position: Forward

Team information
- Current team: Al-Quwa Al-Jawiya (Team supervisor)

Youth career
- 1991–1992: Al-Zawraa

Senior career*
Years	Team	Apps	(Gls)
1992−1995	Al-Naft		
1995−1996	Al-Jaish		
1996−1997	Al-Shorta		
1997−2000	Al-Quwa Al-Jawiya		
1999–2000	→ Al-Zawraa (loan)		
2000−2001	Al-Shorta		
2001	Duhok		
2001−2003	Al-Quwa Al-Jawiya		
2003	Al-Shorta		
2003−2004	Tadamon Sour		
2004−2005	Qardaha		
2005	Saipa		
2005	Al-Quwa Al-Jawiya		
2005−2007	Al-Shahania		
2007−2008	Al-Markhiya		
2008	Duhok		
2008−2009	Fujairah		
2009	Al-Talaba		
2009−2012	Al-Quwa Al-Jawiya		

International career
1997−1999	Iraq U20		
1999−2001	Iraq U23	9	(2)
2000	Iraq B	4	(1)
1999−2005	Iraq	5	(1)

Managerial career
- 2012–2014: Al-Quwa Al-Jawiya (Assist.)
- 2015–2016: Al-Quwa Al-Jawiya (Assist.)
- 2018–2019: Al-Quwa Al-Jawiya (Assist.)
- 2019: Al-Naft SC (Assist.)
- 2019–2020: Al-Zawraa SC (Assist.)
- 2021–: Al-Quwa Al-Jawiya (Team supervisor)
- * Club domestic league appearances and goals

Ahmed Khudhair (Arabic: أَحْمَد خُضَيْر; born 1975) is an Iraqi football coach and former football player. He played as a forward. He was nicknamed Ahmed Baggio by Iraqi fans.

== International career ==
On October 30, 1999, Khudhair played his debut with Iraq against Estonia in his first international match. This was a friendly match in Abu Dhabi, which ended 1-1.

== Coaching career ==
=== Al-Quwa Al-Jawiya ===
Ahmed Khudhair started as an assistant coach to Basim Qasim in Al-Quwa Al-Jawiya in August 2018.

=== Al-Naft SC ===
Khudhair continued with Basim Qasim to be his assistant in Al-Naft SC on 12 march of 2019, after leaving Al-Quwa Al-Jawiya.

=== Al-Zawraa SC ===
On 20 September 2019, Basim Qasim agreed with Al-Zawraa SC to lead the club, and took Khudhair as an assistant.

== Honours ==
=== Club ===
Al-Shorta

- Baghdad Championship: 2000–01

Al-Quwa Al-Jawiya

- Baghdad Championship: 1998–99
- Iraqi Super Cup: 2001

=== Individual ===
- Iraqi Premier League joint-top scorer: 1998–99
