= Munaim Yousif =

Iraqi association football player

Personal information
- Full name: Munaim Yousif Ibrahim
- Date of birth: 10 October 1981 (age 45)
- Place of birth: Iraq
- Position: Defender

International career
Years	Team	Apps	(Gls)
2002	Iraq	2	(0)

Munaim Yousif (born 10 October 1981) is an Iraqi former football defender who played for Iraq U20 at the 2001 FIFA World Youth Championship.

Yousif made 2 appearances for the national team in 2002.
