= Naeem Saddam =

Iraqi footballer

Personal information
- Full name: Naeem Saddam Minshid
- Date of birth: 15 August 1968 (age 58)
- Place of birth: Baghdad, Iraq
- Position: Midfielder

Senior career*
Years	Team	Apps	(Gls)
1984-1986	Al-Sinaa SC		
1986-1990	Al-Rasheed SC		
1990-1991	Al-Karkh		
1991-1994	Al-Zawraa		
1994-1995	Racing Club Beirut		
1995-1996	Qatar SC		
1996-1998	Al-Zawraa		
1998-2001	Al-Quwa Al-Jawiya		
2001-2002	Al-Difaa Al-Jawi SC		
2002-2004	Al-Sinaa SC		

International career
1988–1989	Iraq U20		
1988–1993	Iraq		

Managerial career
- 2008: Al-Kahraba
- * Club domestic league appearances and goals

Naeem Saddam Minshid (Arabic: نَعِيم صَدَّام مُنْشِد; born 15 August 1968) is an Iraqi football midfielder who played for Iraq from 1988 to 1993. He is the younger brother of Karim Saddam. Naeem played in the Iraqi Asian Youth Championship winning side in Doha, Qatar in 1988 and scored the winner against Norway in the World Youth Cup in Saudi Arabia in 1989. He was also part of the Iraqi side that nearly qualified for the World Cup in 1994.

== Career statistics ==
=== International goals ===
Scores and results list Iraq's goal tally first.

No	Date	Venue	Opponent	Score	Result	Competition
1.	18 August 1992	Al-Hassan Stadium, Irbid	Ethiopia	9–0	13–0	1992 Jordan Tournament
2.	20 August 1992	Al-Hassan Stadium, Irbid	Congo	2–0	3–0	1992 Jordan Tournament
3.	28 May 1993	Al-Hassan Stadium, Irbid	Pakistan	8–0	8–0	1994 FIFA World Cup qualification
4.	16 June 1993	Chengdu Sports Centre, Chengdu	Yemen	1–0	3–0	1994 FIFA World Cup qualification
