= Qahtan Chathir =

Iraqi football forward

Personal information
- Full name: Qahtan Chathir Drain
- Date of birth: 20 July 1973 (age 53)
- Place of birth: Iraq
- Position: Forward

Team information
- Current team: Al-Quwa Al-Jawiya (Manager)

Senior career*
Years	Team	Apps	(Gls)
1993–1998	Al Talaba	-	(-)
1998–1999	Al Khor SC	-	(-)
1999–2000	Al Karkh	-	(-)
2000–2002	Al Ittihad	-	(-)
2002–2003	Al-Dhaid	-	(-)
2003–2006	Al Sina	-	(-)

International career
1996–2001	Iraq	21	(7)

Managerial career
- 2007–2013: Al-Sinaa
- 2013–2014: Al-Najaf
- 2014–2017: Iraq U17
- 2015–2016: Al-Shorta
- 2017–2021: Iraq U20
- 2021–2022: Al-Talaba
- 2022–: Al-Quwa Al-Jawiya
- * Club domestic league appearances and goals

Qahtan Chathir Drain (Arabic: قحطان جثير درين; born 20 July 1973) is an Iraqi football forward who played for Iraq in the 1996 Asian Cup. He also played for Al Talaba, Al Karkh, Al Ittihad, Al-Thaid, Al Sinaa.

== Career ==
=== Playing career ===
Qahtan Chathir played for Al Talaba, Al Karkh, Al Ittihad, Al-Thaid and Al Sinaa until he retired in 2007.

=== Coaching career ===
After retiring in 2007, he was named head coach of Al-Sinaa and held the position until 2013.

Qahtan Chathir was appointed as Iraq U17 coach in 2014. He helped them to win the 2016 AFC U-16 Championship for the first time in Iraq's history.

== Statistics ==
=== International goals ===
Scores and results list Iraq's goal tally first.

#	Date	Venue	Opponent	Score	Result	Competition
1.	24 November 1996	Stadio Luigi Ferraris, Genoa	Indonesia	1–0	4–0	Friendly
2.	24 November 1996	Stadio Luigi Ferraris, Genoa	Indonesia	2–0	4–0	Friendly
3.	6 April 1997	Kaloor International Stadium, Cochin	India	1–0	1–0	Friendly
4.	23 May 1997	Railway Stadium, Lahore	Pakistan	2–1	6–2	1998 FIFA World Cup qualification
5.	23 May 1997	Railway Stadium	Pakistan	4–2	6–2	1998 FIFA World Cup qualification
6.	12 October 2000	Saida Municipal Stadium, Sidon	Thailand	1–0	2–0	2000 AFC Asian Cup
7.	12 October 2001	Azadi Stadium, Teheran	Iran	1–1	1–2	2002 FIFA World Cup qualification

=== Managerial statistics ===
As of 29 June 2022

Team	From	To	Record				
Team	From	To	G	W	D	L	Win %
Al-Sinaa SC	1 July 2007	30 June 2013	177	65	67	45	36.72
Al-Najaf FC	28 September 2013	11 February 2014	9	1	4	4	11.11
Iraq U17	1 October 2014	31 October 2017	27	17	8	2	62.96
Al-Shorta	20 October 2015	6 March 2016	14	7	2	5	50.00
Iraq U20	25 October 2017	7 May 2021	26	8	9	9	30.77
Al-Talaba SC	1 August 2021	2 January 2022	17	9	4	4	52.94
Al-Quwa Al-Jawiya	23 May 2022	30 June 2023	8	3	3	2	37.50
Al-Mina'a SC	7 August 2023	4 November 2023	—	−	−	−	—
Newroz SC	13 December 2024	10 July 2025	31	13	9	9	41.94
Total			309	123	106	80	39.81

== Honors ==
=== International ===
Iraq U17

- AFC U-16 Championship: 2016
