= Al-Shorta Stadium (1990) =

Former stadium in Baghdad, Iraq

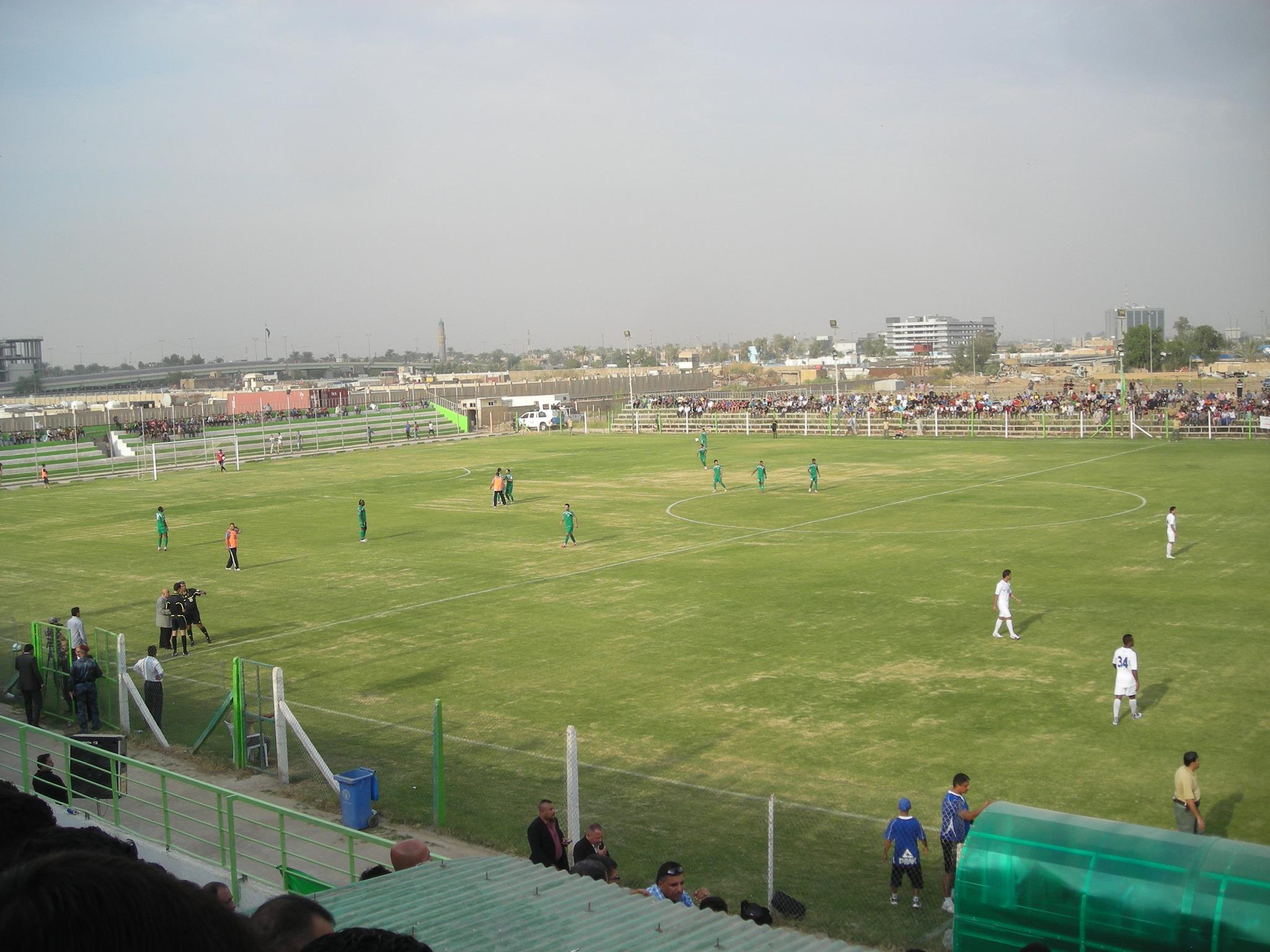
- Al-Shorta Stadium in 2012
- Interactive map of Al-Shorta Stadium
- Full name: Al-Shorta Sports Club Stadium
- Location: Falastin Street, Baghdad, Iraq
- Coordinates: 33°20′22″N 44°26′08″E
- Capacity: 8,634
- Surface: Grass

Construction
- Opened: 1990
- Closed: 2014
- Demolished: 2014

Tenant
- Al-Shorta (1990–2014)

Al-Shorta Stadium (Arabic: ملعب الشرطة) was a multi-use stadium in Baghdad, Iraq. It was used mostly for football matches, serving as the home stadium of Al-Shorta SC, and was able to hold 8,634 people. The stadium was known as "The Cage" (Arabic: القفص) by Al-Shorta fans. The stadium was demolished in March 2014 to make way for the construction of the club's new all-seater stadium.

== History ==
In their early years, the Al-Shorta Select XI played their home matches on the playing field at the team's headquarters, located on what would become Falastin Street in the early 1960s. After the establishment of the Iraqi National Clubs League, the club played their home games at the Local Administration Stadium in Al-Mansour and later at Al-Furusiya Stadium owned by the Ministry of Interior.

In the 1980s, the club decided to build their own stadium at the club's headquarters, with construction of the four stands being overseen by club president Abdul-Qadir Zeinal and work being carried out by club workers and volunteers. Al-Shorta Stadium was opened for its first match on 23 December 1990 with Al-Shorta beating Al-Tijara 3–2. The stadium was able to hold 8,634 people. A white hall was also constructed on the side of the field (named the Abid Kadhim Hall in honour of former player and manager Abid Kadhim), which can hold approximately 2,000 people. The stadium served as Al-Shorta's home ground, and also hosted several other domestic matches in competitions such as the Iraqi Premier League, Iraq FA Cup and Baghdad Championship. Al-Shorta agreed to share the ground with Al-Zawraa during the 2012–13 season.

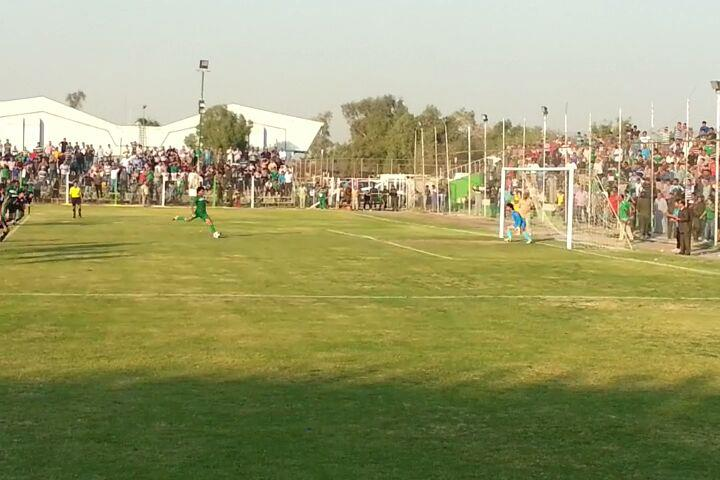
Nashat Akram taking a penalty for Al-Shorta against Zakho at Al-Shorta Stadium in 2013.

Aside from a small number of seats in the roofed VIP section of the main stand, the stadium did not have seats. Instead, each stand was arranged as a series of rising steps. Three of the four stands (the main stand and the stands behind each goal) were constructed as closed riser staircases and were painted green and white to match the club's colours, while the stand next to the training field (opposite the main stand) was constructed as an open riser staircase. The stadium was demolished in March 2014 to make way for the construction of Al-Shorta Sports City, a sports complex for the club including a new all-seater stadium.
