= Hussam Fawzi =

Iraqi footballer and manager

Personal information
- Full name: Hussam Fawzi Naji Hammoudi Al-Jameeli
- Date of birth: 3 September 1974 (age 52)
- Place of birth: Iraq
- Positions: Forward; second striker

Senior career*
Years	Team	Apps	(Gls)
1994-1999	Al-Zawraa		
1999-2001	Dubai CSC		
2001-2005	Al-Zawraa		
2005-2006	Pegah		

International career
1995–2004	Iraq	44	(17)

Managerial career
- 2014–2015: Al-Karkh SC (assistant manager)
- 2018–2019: Al-Diwaniya (assistant manager)
- 2019–2020: Al-Qasim
- 2021: Al-Zawraa SC (assistant manager)
- * Club domestic league appearances and goals

Hussam Fawzi Naji Hammoudi Al-Jameeli (Arabic: حُسَام فَوْزِيّ نَاجِي حَمُّودِيّ الْجَمِيلِيّ; born 3 September 1974) is an Iraqi football manager and former player who played as a forward. He was the captain of the Iraq national team.

== Playing career ==
Hussam was a leader of the Iraqi strikeforce capable of moments of genius during a game. He scored two goals against Al-Shorta in the 2–1 win in the Iraqi Cup final in 1996.

The greatest moment in his career came when he scored one goal and set-up another against Iran at the 1996 Asian Cup and was later awarded man of the match. The goal came after Hussam had pounced on a ball from Samir Kadhim, who had sent a long ball from the Iranian defence straight into the Iranian box and to the feet of the player, the striker ferociously shot from an impossible angle from the right and scored, starting endless celebrations from the Al-Makhtoum Stadium on to the streets of Iraq.

His 2 goals for Iraq in the Pan-Arab final underlined his importance to the team after Iraq was 4–0 down with less than 20 minutes left.

He represented Iraq whilst playing his club football at Al-Zawraa. He played for in Iraq at the time when Uday Hussein was in charge of the national team. Hussam was included in the 1996 and 2000 squads for the Asian Cup.

== Punishment ==
The Iraqi football team came into public attention when newspapers started publishing stories of how Uday Hussein was known to punish players physically for achieving poor results in matches. This was used as one of the many reasons used by Tony Blair for justifying the Iraq War.

As a result of difficulties and the resulting Iraq War Hussam was unable to play international football for a while, however with the overthrow of Saddam Hussein football started to be played again. (The Iraqi league had previously been suspended since March 2003.) Hussam captained Iraq for the first time on 13 August 2003 against Iran in the first international after this, and for the determination in a difficult time, the 2003 FIFA Presidential Award was presented to the Iraqi footballing community, whom Husam represented at the award ceremony as the National Team captain.

After the war Hussam spoke about his experiences in London, saying:

When players get punished in the West, they get wages taken away, but never their physical safety. There were tortures, there were imprisonments, but this is the time to rebuild.

— Hussam Fawzi

He also admitted the after the Iraqi players were relieved the past was behind them but he refused to justify the war.

== International goals ==
Scores and results list Iraq's goal tally first, score column indicates score after each Fawzi goal.

List of international goals scored by Hussam Fawzi
No.	Date	Venue	Opponent	Score	Result	Competition
1	11 August 1996	Amman International Stadium, Amman	Pakistan	2–0	3–0	1996 AFC Asian Cup qualification
2	5 December 1996	Al-Maktoum Stadium, Dubai	Iran	1–0	2–1	1996 AFC Asian Cup
3	23 May 1997	Lahore Stadium, Lahore	Pakistan	1–0	6–2	1998 FIFA World Cup qualifiers
4	23 May 1997	Lahore Stadium, Lahore	Pakistan	4–2	6–2	1998 FIFA World Cup qualifiers
5	20 June 1997	Al Shaab Stadium, Baghdad	Pakistan	4–1	6–1	1998 FIFA World Cup qualifiers
6	7 August 1999	Pamir Stadium, Dushanbe	Kyrgyzstan	2–1	5–1	2000 AFC Asian Cup qualification
7	7 August 1999	Pamir Stadium, Dushanbe	Kyrgyzstan	2–1	5–1	2000 AFC Asian Cup qualification
8	19 August 1999	Amman International Stadium, Amman	Bahrain	1–0	2–0	1999 Pan Arab Games
9	23 August 1999	Amman International Stadium, Amman	Oman	1–0	3–0	1999 Pan Arab Games
10	23 August 1999	Amman International Stadium, Amman	Oman	2–0	3–0	1999 Pan Arab Games
11	29 August 1999	Amman International Stadium, Amman	Libya	2–1	3–1	1999 Pan Arab Games
12	31 August 1999	Amman International Stadium, Amman	Jordan	1–4	4–4	1999 Pan Arab Games
13	31 August 1999	Amman International Stadium, Amman	Jordan	2–4	4–4	1999 Pan Arab Games
14	23 May 2000	King Abdullah International Stadium, Amman	Lebanon	2–1	2–1	2000 West Asian Football Federation Championship
15	13 August 2003	Azadi Stadium, Tehran	Iran	1–0	1–0	LG Cup
16	20 October 2003	Bahrain National Stadium, Manama	Malaysia	5–1	5–1	2004 Asian Cup qualifiers
17	9 June 2004	King Abdullah International Stadium, Amman	Taiwan	3–0	6–1	2006 FIFA World Cup qualifiers

Sporting positions
Preceded by Emad Hashim	Iraq captain 2003 - 2004	Succeeded by Razzaq Farhan
