= Akram Emmanuel =

Iraqi footballer (born 1967)

Personal information
- Full name: Akram Emmanuel Yousif
- Date of birth: July 1, 1967 (age 59)
- Place of birth: Iraq
- Position: Forward

International career
Years	Team	Apps	(Gls)
1992–1993	Iraq		

Akram Emmanuel Yousif (Arabic: أَكْرَم عَمَّانُوئِيل يُوسُف; born 1 July 1967) is a former Iraqi football striker who played for Iraq in the 1994 FIFA World Cup qualification. He played for the national team between 1992 and 1993.

He scored the winning goal in the 1991–92 Iraqi National League to earn Al-Quwa Al-Jawiya the league title.

== Career statistics ==
=== International goals ===
Scores and results list Iraq's goal tally first.

No	Date	Venue	Opponent	Score	Result	Competition
1.	20 June 1993	Chengdu Sports Centre, Chengdu	China	1–0	1–2	1994 FIFA World Cup qualification
