= Husham Mohammed =

Iraqi footballer

Personal information
- Full name: Husham Mohammed Fayadh Al-Dilimi
- Date of birth: 10 May 1974 (age 52)
- Place of birth: Ramadi, Iraq
- Height: 1.66 m (5 ft 5 1/2 in)
- Positions: Striker; second striker

Team information
- Current team: Without Club (assistant coach)

Senior career*
Years	Team	Apps	(Gls)
1997–2012	Al-Zawraa		
2012–2013	Al-Talaba		
2013–2014	Al-Karkh		

International career
1998–2002	Iraq	35	(18)

Managerial career
- 2019–2020: Zakho (assistant)
- * Club domestic league appearances and goals

Husham Mohammed Fayadh Al-Dulaimi (Arabic: هشام محمد فياض الدليمي, simply known as Husham Mohammed, born 10 May 1974 in Ramadi, Iraq) is a former Iraqi football striker who last played for Al-Karkh in Iraq.

He made his debut for Iraq in 1998. After never been given an opportunity in an Iraqi jersey by former coaches Najih Humoud and Milan Zivadinovic, Husham was thrown a lifeline by Adnan Hamad who gave him a starting place against Macao ahead of regular striker Qahtan Chathir alongside Sabah Jeayer. He took his chance scoring 5 goals in the game helping Iraq to an 8-0 trashing over their group rivals.

== International goals ==
Scores and results list Iraq's goal tally first.

#	Date	Venue	Opponent	Score	Result	Competition
1.	27 August 1999	Amman International Stadium, Amman	Lebanon	1–0	4–0	1999 Pan Arab Games
2.	27 August 1999	Amman International Stadium, Amman	Lebanon	2–0	4–0	1999 Pan Arab Games
3.	3 November 1999	National Stadium, Abu Dhabi, UAE	United Arab Emirates	2–2	2–2	International Friendly
4.	27 May 2000	King Abdullah Stadium, Amman,	Kyrgyzstan	4–0	4–0	2000 WAFF
5.	3 September 2000	Shanghai Stadium, Shanghai	China	1–4	1–4	International Friendly
6.	12 April 2001	Al-Shaab Stadium, Baghdad	Macau	1–0	8–0	2002 World Cup Qual.
7.	12 April 2001	Al-Shaab Stadium, Baghdad	Macau	2–0	8–0	2002 World Cup Qual.
8.	12 April 2001	Al-Shaab Stadium, Baghdad	Macau	3–0	8–0	2002 World Cup Qual.
9.	12 April 2001	Al-Shaab Stadium, Baghdad	Macau	4–0	8–0	2002 World Cup Qual.
10.	12 April 2001	Al-Shaab Stadium, Baghdad	Macau	6–0	8–0	2002 World Cup Qual.
11.	14 April 2001	Al-Shaab Stadium, Baghdad	Nepal	2–0	9–1	2002 World Cup Qual.
12.	14 April 2001	Al-Shaab Stadium, Baghdad	Nepal	7–1	9–1	2002 World Cup Qual.
13.	2 August 2001	Al Nahyan Stadium, Abu Dhabi, UAE	United Arab Emirates	1–1	2–2	International Friendly
14.	17 August 2001	Al-Shaab Stadium, Baghdad	Thailand	1–0	4–0	2002 World Cup Qual.
15.	17 August 2001	Al-Shaab Stadium, Baghdad	Thailand	3–0	4–0	2002 World Cup Qual.
16.	13 January 2002	Al-Wakrah Stadium, Doha	Qatar	3–1	3–1	International Friendly
17.	15 August 2003	Azadi Stadium, Tehran	Uruguay	1–2	2–5	2003 LG Cup.
18.	12 October 2003	Bukit Jalil Stadium, Kuala Lumpur	Myanmar	3–0	3–0	2004 Asian Cup qual.

== Coaching career ==
=== Zakho FC ===
Mohammed began his coaching career as an assistant to the Libyan Abdul-Hafeedh Arbeesh in Zakho FC club, Arbeesh got sacked after 2 months. Mohammed stayed in the club as an assistant to the new coach Ali Hadi.
