= Baghdad Championship =

- Organiser(s): Iraq Football Association
- Founded: 1991
- Abolished: 2004
- Region: Iraq
- Teams: 8 (from 1994–95)
- Last champions: Al-Zawraa (3rd title)
- Most championships: Al-Quwa Al-Jawiya; Al-Shorta; Al-Talaba; Al-Zawraa (3 titles each)

The Baghdad Championship (Arabic: بطولة بغداد), formerly known as the Umm al-Ma'arik Championship (Arabic: بطولة أم المعارك, lit. 'Mother of all Battles Championship'), was an annual football competition in men's domestic Iraqi football that was usually held at the beginning of each season. It was founded in the 1991–92 season, and its last edition was in the 2003–04 season.

The top eight teams of the previous Iraqi Premier League season entered the competition, with the exception of the first and third editions, where the top six teams of the league entered. The teams were split into two groups, and the top two teams from each group advanced to the semi-finals. The winners would contest the final, and the losers would play for third place. All of the competition's matches were played in Baghdad.

The tournament was one of the four major domestic trophies attainable by top-flight teams at the time, alongside the league championship, the Iraq FA Cup and the Iraqi Perseverance Cup. In the first edition, the winners received a 7k IQD prize money, while the runners-up received 5k IQD. In the second edition, because of the economical changes that accrued on the dinar, the winners were given 150k IQD and the runners-up were given 100k IQD.

== History ==
The idea of this tournament was requested by the administration of Al-Talaba SC to the Iraq Football Association and it was to put the top six teams of the 1990–91 Iraqi National League in a single-elimination competition, because of the lack of Iraqi competitions other than the Iraqi National League and the Iraq FA Cup. The Iraq FA accepted the request on 24 August 1991, and put up a committee to administrate the competition, which decided to name the tournament as the Umm al-Ma'arik Championship (referring to the name that Saddam Hussein referred to the Gulf War as) and to make 2 September the opening date. Over 55,000 spectators came to Al-Shaab Stadium, a ground that could only hold 50,000 at the time, to watch the cup final between Al-Zawraa and Al-Quwa Al-Jawiya, which ended with a 3–1 win for Al-Zawraa. After the first edition of the competition that was set up by Al-Talaba, the Iraq Football Association adopted the competition due to its promising reception from fans, and increased the number of participating teams from six to eight.

Due to the end of the rule of the former president Saddam Hussein in April 2003, the Iraq Football Association decided to change the competition's name from Umm al-Ma'arik Championship to Baghdad Championship due to the former name's resemblance to the Gulf War. It was named the Baghdad Championship because all of the competition's matches were played in Baghdad, being divided between Al-Shorta Stadium, Al-Karkh Stadium, Al-Zawraa Stadium, and Al-Sinaa Stadium. It ended with Al-Zawraa winning the championship. This was the first and last edition of the Baghdad Championship, as the tournament was discontinued after that season.

== Records and statistics ==
=== Results ===
Ed.	Season	Final			Third place playoff or losing semi-finalists		
Ed.	Season	Champions	Score	Runners-up	Third place	Score	Fourth place
Umm al-Ma'arik Championship
1st	1991–92	Al-Zawraa	3–1 (a.e.t.)	Al-Quwa Al-Jawiya	Al-Talaba	2–2 (a.e.t.) (4–3 p)	Al-Karkh
2nd	1992–93	Al-Talaba	1–0 (a.e.t.)	Al-Quwa Al-Jawiya	Al-Zawraa	4–0	Al-Naft
3rd	1993–94	Al-Talaba	2–1	Al-Quwa Al-Jawiya	Al-Zawraa	1–0	Al-Karkh
4th	1994–95	Al-Quwa Al-Jawiya	0–0 (a.e.t.) (4–3 p)	Al-Talaba	Al-Zawraa	2–1	Al-Najaf
5th	1995–96	Al-Talaba	1–0	Al-Quwa Al-Jawiya	Al-Zawraa	3–0	Al-Naft
6th	1996–97	Al-Quwa Al-Jawiya	1–0 (g.g.)	Al-Zawraa	Al-Najaf	1–0	Al-Shorta
7th	1997–98	Al-Najaf	4–0	Al-Shorta	Al-Zawraa	7–0	Al-Talaba
8th	1998–99	Al-Quwa Al-Jawiya	3–0	Al-Naft	Al-Talaba	3–1	Al-Minaa
9th	1999–2000	Al-Zawraa	2–0	Al-Quwa Al-Jawiya	Al-Karkh	3–0	Al-Talaba
10th	2000–01	Al-Shorta	1–0	Al-Zawraa	Al-Karkh	2–1	Al-Talaba
11th	2001–02	Al-Shorta	1–0 (g.g.)	Al-Talaba	Al-Karkh	2–1	Al-Quwa Al-Jawiya
12th	2002–03	Al-Shorta	1–0	Al-Talaba	Al-Zawraa	2–1	Al-Quwa Al-Jawiya
Baghdad Championship
1st	2003–04	Al-Zawraa	2–2 (a.e.t.) (5–4 p)	Al-Talaba	Al-Quwa Al-Jawiya and Al-Shorta		

=== Most successful clubs ===
Team	Winners	Runners-up	Winning seasons	Runner-up seasons
Al-Quwa Al-Jawiya	3	5	1994–95, 1996–97, 1998–99	1991–92, 1992–93, 1993–94, 1995–96, 1999–2000
Al-Talaba	3	4	1992–93, 1993–94, 1995–96	1994–95, 2001–02, 2002–03, 2003–04
Al-Zawraa	3	2	1991–92, 1999–2000, 2003–04	1996–97, 2000–01
Al-Shorta	3	1	2000–01, 2001–02, 2002–03	1997–98
Al-Najaf	1	0	1997–98	–
Al-Naft	0	1	–	1998–99

== List of winning managers ==
Season	Nationality	Winning manager	Club
Umm al-Ma'arik Championship
1991–92	Iraq	Ali Kadhim	Al-Zawraa
1992–93	Iraq	Yahya Alwan	Al-Talaba
1993–94	Iraq	Hussein Saeed	Al-Talaba
1994–95	Iraq	Adnan Dirjal	Al-Quwa Al-Jawiya
1995–96	Iraq	Ayoub Odisho	Al-Talaba
1996–97	Iraq	Ayoub Odisho	Al-Quwa Al-Jawiya
1997–98	Iraq	Najih Humoud	Al-Najaf
1998–99	Iraq	Nazar Ashraf	Al-Quwa Al-Jawiya
1999–2000	Iraq	Adnan Hamad	Al-Zawraa
2000–01	Iraq	Ahmed Radhi	Al-Shorta
2001–02	Iraq	Yassin Umal	Al-Shorta
2002–03	Iraq	Basim Qasim	Al-Shorta
Baghdad Championship
2003–04	Iraq	Adnan Hamad	Al-Zawraa

== See also ==
- Iraq FA Cup
- Iraq Stars League
- Iraq Football Association
