= Abbas Rahim =

Iraqi footballer

Personal information
- Full name: Abbas Rahim Zaywer
- Date of birth: 25 January 1979
- Place of birth: Baghdad, Iraq
- Date of death: 10 August 2012 (aged 33)
- Place of death: Baghdad, Iraq
- Position: Midfielder

Senior career*
Years	Team	Apps	(Gls)
1996-1997	Al-Karkh SC		
1997-1998	Al-Shorta		
1998-1999	Al-Karkh SC		
1999-2000	Al-Shorta		
2000	Al-Zawraa		
2000-2004	Al-Shorta		
2004	Al-Jaish		
2004-2005	Al-Shorta		
2005-2006	Al-Zawraa		

International career
1999–2003	Iraq	35	(4)
- * Club domestic league appearances and goals

Abbas Rahim Zaywer (Arabic: عَبَّاس رَحِيم زَايِر; 25 January 1979 – 10 August 2012) was an Iraqi football midfielder who played for Iraq in the 2000 Asian Cup and Al-Shorta and Al-Zawraa.

== Playing career ==
Abbas Rahim was born on January 25, 1979, in Baghdad and started his playing career in the junior teams of Al-Nafat and Salikh. At the age of 13, he joined the Talaba youth where he spent two years before joining Al-Karkh - making his first team debut in 1995. A year later he transferred to Al-Shurta winning the league title in 1997–98. After a brief spell at Al-Karkh, he joined ‘the White Seagulls’ Al-Zawraa, winning the double in 2000 and scoring a remarkable seven goals in his first three league games for the club. Abbas joined Al-Shurta for the second time in 2001.

He was a prolific goal scorer at the youth and Under-19 levels, where he helped Iraq qualify for the AFC Asian Youth Championship in 1998. He starred for the Iraqi Olympic side.

Abbas made his debut during the 1999 Pan-Arab games in Amman against Libya, scoring his first international goal in a 4–0 win against Lebanon. He played a part in the final against the hosts hitting the cross bar in extra time and was also one of three who hit the post in the penalty shoot-out.

== International goals ==
Scores and results list Iraq's goal tally first.

#	Date	Venue	Opponent	Score	Result	Competition
1.	27 August 1999	Al-Hassan Stadium, Irbid	Lebanon	3–0	4–0	1999 Pan Arab Games
2.	3 November 1999	National Stadium, Abu Dhabi	United Arab Emirates	1–0	2–2	Friendly
3.	22 October 2003	Manama National Stadium, Manama	Myanmar	2–1	3–1	2004 AFC Asian Cup qualification

== Death ==
On 10 August 2012, Rahim died in a car crash on the road from Baghdad to Najaf. He was 33 years old.
