= 2025 Iraqi Super Cup =

Iraqi football competition

Tournament cancelled

Tournament details
- Host country: Iraq
- Dates: 19–29 August 2025
- Teams: 6

The 2025 Iraqi Super Cup was set to be the 12th edition of the Iraqi Super Cup, an annual football competition for clubs in the Iraqi football league system that were successful in its major competitions in the preceding season. It was set to be the first edition of the tournament under a new six-team format which was announced on 24 May 2025.

On 15 August 2025, the Iraq Football Association confirmed that the competition had been cancelled after several teams had announced their intention to withdraw from the tournament due to insufficient preparation time.

== Qualification ==
The tournament was set to feature a revamped format, where the top four teams from the 2024–25 Iraq Stars League and the winners and runners-up of the 2024–25 Iraq FA Cup would participate, instead of the traditional format of a one-off game between the winners of the Iraq Stars League and the Iraq FA Cup.

=== Qualified teams ===
The following six teams had qualified for the tournament.

Group & Position	Team	Method of qualification	Appearance	Last appearance as	Previous performance	
Group & Position	Team	Method of qualification	Appearance	Last appearance as	Winner(s)	Runners-up
A1	Al-Shorta	2024–25 Iraq Stars League champions	4th	2022 winners	2	1
B2	Al-Zawraa	2024–25 Iraq Stars League runners-up	9th	2021 winners	5	3
B3	Al-Talaba	2024–25 Iraq Stars League fourth place	4th	2002 winners	1	2
A3	Al-Quwa Al-Jawiya	2024–25 Iraq Stars League fifth place	7th	2021 runners-up	2	4
B1	Duhok	2024–25 Iraq FA Cup winners	1st	–	–	–
A2	Zakho	2024–25 Iraq FA Cup runners-up 2024–25 Iraq Stars League third place	1st	–	–	–

== Group stage ==
Tiebreakers
Teams are ranked according to points (3 points for a win, 1 point for a draw, 0 points for a loss), and if tied on points, the following tiebreaking criteria are applied, in the order given, to determine the rankings:
1. Points in head-to-head matches among tied teams;
2. Goal difference in head-to-head matches among tied teams;
3. Goals scored in head-to-head matches among tied teams;
4. If more than two teams were tied, and after applying all head-to-head criteria above, a subset of teams were still tied, all head-to-head criteria above were reapplied exclusively to this subset of teams;
5. Goal difference in all group matches;
6. Goals scored in all group matches;
7. Disciplinary points (yellow card = 1 point, red card as a result of two yellow cards = 3 points, direct red card = 3 points, yellow card followed by direct red card = 4 points);
8. Drawing of lots.

=== Group A ===
Pos	Team	Pld	W	D	L	GF	GA	GD	Pts	Qualification
1	Al-Shorta	0	–	–	–	–	–	—	0	Final
2	Zakho	0	–	–	–	–	–	—	0	Third place match
3	Al-Quwa Al-Jawiya	0	–	–	–	–	–	—	0	

Source: 365 Scores
Rules for classification: Group stage tiebreakers
19 August 2025

Al-Shorta	Cancelled	Al-Quwa Al-Jawiya

22 August 2025

Al-Quwa Al-Jawiya	Cancelled	Zakho

25 August 2025

Zakho	Cancelled	Al-Shorta

=== Group B ===
Pos	Team	Pld	W	D	L	GF	GA	GD	Pts	Qualification
1	Duhok	0	–	–	–	–	–	—	0	Final
2	Al-Zawraa	0	–	–	–	–	–	—	0	Third place match
3	Al-Talaba	0	–	–	–	–	–	—	0	

Source: 365 Scores
Rules for classification: Group stage tiebreakers
19 August 2025

Duhok	Cancelled	Al-Talaba

22 August 2025

Al-Talaba	Cancelled	Al-Zawraa

25 August 2025

Al-Zawraa	Cancelled	Duhok

== Third place match ==
28 August 2025

Runner-up Group A	Cancelled	Runner-up Group B

== Final ==
29 August 2025

Winner Group A	Cancelled	Winner Group B
