= Ahmad Abdul-Jabar =

Iraqi footballer (born 1978)

Personal information
- Full name: Ahmad Abdul-Jabar Jassim
- Date of birth: 8 January 1978 (age 48)
- Place of birth: Iraq
- Position: Midfielder

Team information
- Current team: Al-Karkh SC (Manager)

Youth career
- 1989–1995: Al-Karkh

Senior career*
Years	Team	Apps	(Gls)
1995–1997	Al-Karkh		
1997–2002	Al-Zawraa		
2002–2004	Al-Shamal		
2004–2006	Al-Zawraa		
2006–2008	Al-Yarmouk		
2008–2009	Duhok		
2009–2010	Baghdad		
2010–2011	Al-Zawraa		
2011–2012	Zakho		
2012–2015	Al-Karkh		

International career^{‡}
1998–2009	Iraq	27	(0)

Managerial career
- 2018: Al-Sinaat Al-Kahrabaiya (Caretaker)
- 2019: Al-Sinaat Al-Kahrabaiya (Caretaker)
- 2019: Al-Sinaat Al-Kahrabaiya
- 2019: Al-Sinaat Al-Kahrabaiya (Assist. coach)
- 2019–2020: Al-Karkh (Assist. coach)
- 2020–2021: Al-Karkh
- 2021: Al-Karkh (Assist. coach)
- 2021–2022: Al-Sinaat Al-Kahrabaiya SC
- 2022–: Al-Karkh
- * Club domestic league appearances and goals ‡ National team caps and goals as of 23 July 2019

Ahmad Abdul-Jabar (Arabic: أَحْمَد عَبْد الْجَبَّار جَاسِم; born 8 January 1978) is an Iraqi former Iraq national football team football player who is currently manager of Al-Karkh SC.

Ahmad, known as Al-Alemane ('The German') by his teammates, due to his fair skin and hair. He bore a slight resemblance to Brazilian Juninho of Middlesbrough and Atletico Madrid.

The qualified engineer also had the diminutive Brazilian's same penchant for taking on defenders with mazey runs and is often employed to support the front two. In 1996, he moved to Al-Zawraa from Al-Karkh, a club he joined at the age of 11 and flourished under coaches Amer Jamil and then Adnan Hamad.

It was Hamad who encouraged him to use his imagination more on the field, by thinking of himself as a fox; cunning and clever.

== Manager career ==
Ahmad started his coaching career by becoming the assistant for Abbas Attiya at the start of the season 2018–2019, then led the team for a while after the leaving of Attiya. Ahmad then also became the assistant of Mudhafar Jabbar Tawfik in the same season. After leaving of Tawfik, Ahmad came back again and led the team with a great and massive win over Naft Maysan FC in Maysan Stadium, which led to the appointment of him as the head coach on 3 February 2019.

== Managerial statistics ==
As of 3 July 2022

Team	Nat	From	To	Record				
Team	Nat	From	To	G	W	D	L	Win %
Al-Sinaat (Caretaker)	(Iraq)	7 November 2018	29 November 2018	4	1	2	1	25.00
Al-Sinaat (Caretaker)	(Iraq)	23 February 2019	3 March 2019	1	1	0	0	100.00
Al-Sinaat	(Iraq)	3 March 2019	24 July 2019	19	6	6	7	31.58
Al-Karkh SC	(Iraq)	2 December 2020	18 July 2021	45	14	14	17	31.11
Al-Sinaat	(Iraq)	3 December 2021	19 February 2022	9	3	4	2	33.33
Al-Karkh SC	(Iraq)	21 February 2022	""Present""	19	8	8	3	42.11
Total				97	33	34	30	34.02

== Honours ==
=== Player ===
==== Club ====
Al-Zawraa

- Iraqi Premier League: 1998–99, 1999–2000, 2000–01, 2005–06, 2010–11
- Iraq FA Cup: 1997–98, 1998–99, 1999–2000
- Baghdad Championship: 1999–2000
- Iraqi Super Cup: 1998, 1999, 2000

==== International ====
- WAFF Championship: 2002

=== As A Manager ===
Al-Karkh

- Iraq FA Cup: 2021–22
