= Abbas Qasim =

Iraqi footballer

Abbas Qasim Zghair Al-Kaabi
Personal information
- Date of birth: 15 January 1991 (age 35)
- Place of birth: Baghdad, Iraq
- Position: Defender

Team information
- Current team: Al-Kahrabaa

Senior career*
Years	Team	Apps	(Gls)
2011–2012	Al-Talaba		
2012–2015	Amanat Baghdad		
2015–2016	Zakho		
2016–2023	Al-Zawraa	25	(0)
2023–2024	Sanat Naft	5	(0)
2024	Al-Zawraa SC	0	(0)
2024–2026	Al-Karma SC	4	(1)
2026–	Al-Kahrabaa		

International career^{‡}
2014	Iraq U23		
2016–2022	Iraq	3	(0)
- * Club domestic league appearances and goals as of 17 December 2024 @ 08:50(AEST) ‡ National team caps and goals as of 2 August 2023

Abbas Qasim Zghair Al-Kaabi (Arabic: عباس قاسم زغير الكعبي; born 15 January 1991) is an Iraqi footballer who plays as a centre-back Iraq Stars League club for Al-Kahrabaa, as well as the Iraq national team.

== International career ==
On 24 July 2016, Abbas made his first international cap with Iraq against Uzbekistan in a friendly match.

== Honours ==
Al-Zawraa

- Iraqi Premier League: 2017–18
- Iraq FA Cup: 2016–17, 2018–19
- Iraqi Super Cup: 2017, 2021

=== Individual ===
- 15/16 IPL Centre back of the season
