= Thair Ahmed =

Iraqi football coach (born 1959)

Personal information
- Full name: Thair Ahmed
- Date of birth: July 1, 1959 (age 67)

Team information
- Current team: Al-Talaba (Manager)

Managerial career
- Years: Team
- 2001–2007: Al-Talaba
- 2010–2011: Al Quwa Al Jawiya
- 2011: Al-Talaba
- 2015–2016: Erbil
- 2016: Naft Al-Wasat
- 2016: Al-Zawraa
- 2018: Amanat Baghdad
- 2019: Al-Talaba
- 2021: Al-Karkh SC (Technical Advisor)
- 2022–: Al-Talaba

Thair Ahmed (Arabic: ثَائِر أَحْمَد; born 1 July 1959) is an Iraqi football coach, who coaches Al-Talaba.

== Coaching career ==
Ahmed began the 2018-2019 season with leading of Amanat Baghdad for 14 games, then he moved to his glory club Al-Talaba SC. He is coaching the elegant boys now.

== Statistics ==
=== Managerial statistics ===
As of 2 July 2022

Team	Nat	From	To	Record				
Team	Nat	From	To	G	W	D	L	Win %
Erbil	(Iraq)	1 September 2015	3 March 2016	17	5	8	4	29.41
Naft Al-Wasat	(Iraq)	17 March 2016	22 May 2016	7	4	2	1	57.14
Al-Zawraa	(Iraq)	14 June 2016	1 November 2016	6	2	2	2	33.33
Amanat Baghdad	(Iraq)	13 March 2018	20 December 2018	35	12	11	12	34.29
Al-Talaba SC	(Iraq)	1 March 2019	11 June 2019	13	3	4	6	23.08
Al-Talaba SC	(Iraq)	2 July 2022	""Present""	0	0	0	0	—
Total				78	26	27	25	33.33

== Honours ==
=== Managerial ===
==== Club ====
Al-Talaba

- Iraqi Premier League: 2001–02
- Iraq FA Cup: 2001–02, 2002–03
- Iraqi Super Cup: 2002
- Baghdad Day Cup: 2001

Erbil

- Iraqi Premier League: 2007–08, 2008–09

==== Individual ====
- Best manager of the 2003–04 Arab Champions League
