= 1997 Iraqi Perseverance Cup =

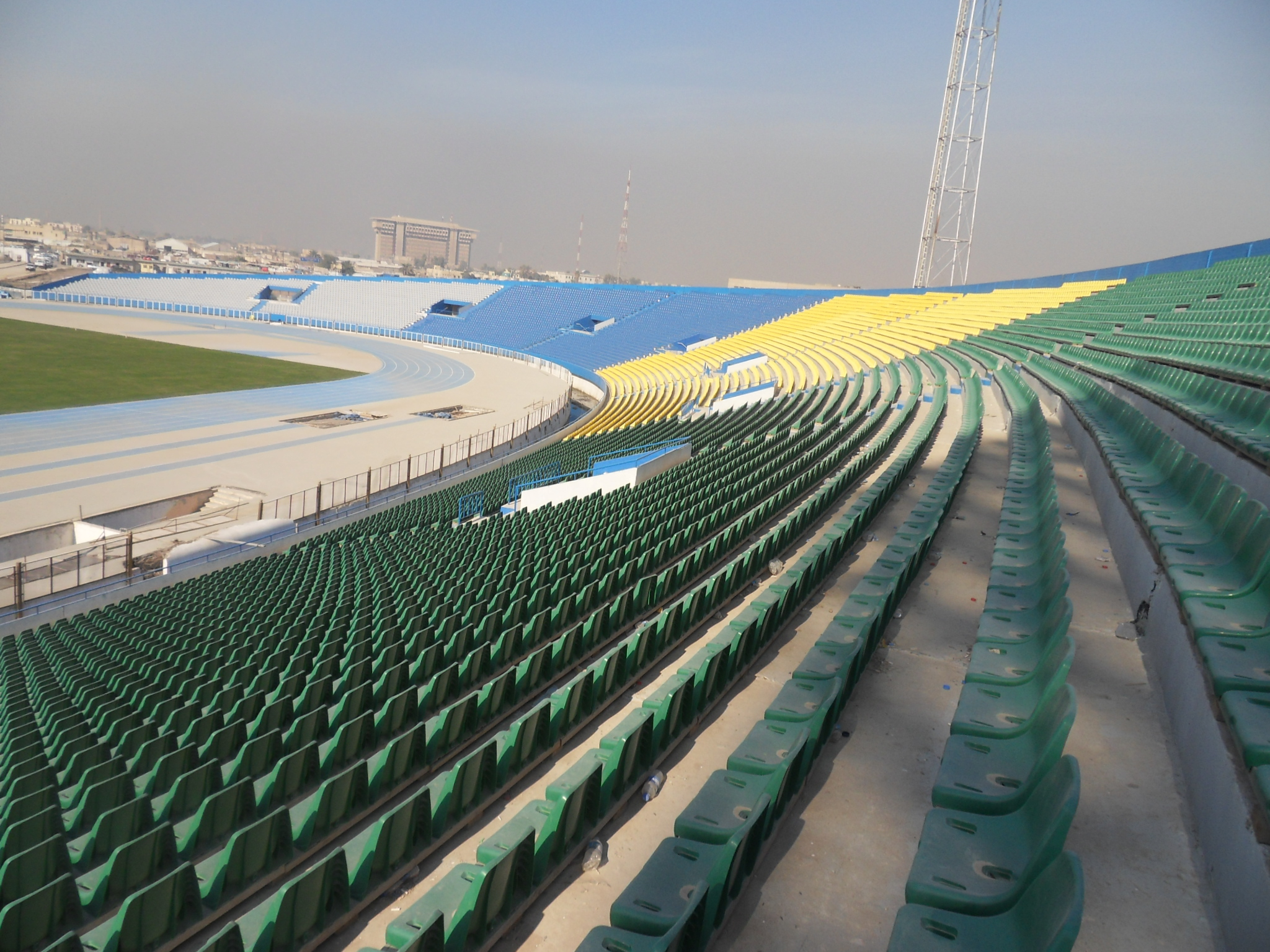
- The match took place at Al-Shaab Stadium
Al-Quwa Al-Jawiya	Al-Zawraa
3	1
- Date: 16 May 1997
- Venue: Al-Shaab Stadium, Baghdad
- Referee: Falah Manfi

The 1997 Iraqi Perseverance Cup (Arabic: كأس المثابرة العراقي 1997) was the 2nd edition of the Iraqi Super Cup. The match was contested between the two Baghdad rivals, Al-Quwa Al-Jawiya and Al-Zawraa, at Al-Shaab Stadium in Baghdad. It was played on 16 May 1997 to bring an end to the 1996–97 season. Al-Quwa Al-Jawiya won the game 3–1 to become the first Iraqi team to win the domestic quadruple.

== Match ==
=== Details ===
16 May 1997

Al-Quwa Al-Jawiya	3–1	Al-Zawraa
Daham; Farhan		Mahdi

Al-Shaab Stadium, Baghdad
Referee: Falah Manfi

Al-Quwa Al-Jawiya	Al-Zawraa

GK
DF
DF
DF
DF
MF
MF
MF
MF
FW
FW
Substitutions:
GK
Manager:
(Iraq) Ayoub Odisho

(Iraq) Hadi Jaber	Sent off (straight red)
(Iraq) Ali Raouf
(Iraq) Hamza Hadi
(Iraq) Sharar Haidar
(Iraq) Munthir Khalaf
(Iraq) Mudhahar Khalaf
(Iraq) Waleed Dhahid
(Iraq) Haitham Kadhim Jassim
(Iraq) Ahmed Daham
(Iraq) Akram Emmanuel (c)
(Iraq) Razzaq Farhan
(Iraq) Hashim Khamis	Substituted in

GK	(Iraq) Mohsen Hadi
DF	(Iraq) Amer Qasim
DF	(Iraq) Hisham Ali
DF	(Iraq) Mazin Abdul-Sattar
DF	(Iraq) Ahmed Hussein Adan
MF	(Iraq) Mohamed Jassim Mahdi (c)
MF	(Iraq) Ahmed Abdul-Jabar
MF	(Iraq) Naeem Saddam
MF	(Iraq) Adnan Mohammed
FW	(Iraq) Yassir Abdul-Latif
FW	(Iraq) Muayad Judi
Manager:
(Iraq) Hadi Mutanash

Match rules

- 90 minutes.
- 30 minutes of golden goal extra time if necessary.
- Penalty shoot-out if scores still level.
- Seven named substitutes, of which up to three may be used.

Iraqi Super Cup
1997 winner
Al-Quwa Al-Jawiya
1st title
