= Mazin Fayyadh =

Iraqi footballer

Mazin Fayyadh Ajeel
Personal information
- Date of birth: 2 April 1997 (age 29)
- Place of birth: Nasiriyah, Iraq
- Height: 1.76 m (5 ft 9 1/2 in)
- Position: Right winger

Team information
- Current team: Al-Nasiriya

Youth career
- –2013: Al-Nasiriya

Senior career*
Years	Team	Apps	(Gls)
2013–2014	Al-Diwaniya		(?)
2014–2015	Karbala		(?)
2015–2019	Al-Naft		(25)
2019–2021	Al-Shorta	33	(2)
2021–2022	Al-Zawraa		(3)
2022–2023	Erbil		(0)
2023–2024	Al-Naft		(5)
2024–2025	Karbala		
2025–2026	Al-Naft		
2026–	Al-Nasiriya		

International career^{‡}
2015–2016	Iraq U20	4	(1)
2017	Iraq U23	3	(0)
2016–2020	Iraq	13	(1)
- * Club domestic league appearances and goals as of 21 July 2023 ‡ National team caps and goals as of 17 November 2020

Mazin Fayyadh Ajeel (Arabic: مَازِن فَيَّاض عَجِيل; born 2 April 1997) is an Iraqi footballer who plays as a right winger for Al-Nasiriya in Iraqi Premier Division League.

== International career ==
Following his impressive performances with Al Naft, scoring five goals during the 2015–16 Iraqi Elite League season. Mazin was called up to the Iraqi NT squad an On 24 July 2016 he made his first international cap with Iraq against Uzbekistan in a friendly match. He scored his first goal in a friendly match against Syria.

=== International goals ===
Scores and results list Iraq's goal tally first.

#	Date	Venue	Opponent	Score	Result	Competition
1.	26 August 2017	Hang Jebat Stadium, Malacca, Malaysia	Syria	1–1	1–1	Friendly

== Honours ==
=== Club ===
Al-Zawraa

- Iraqi Super Cup: 2021
