= Fahad Talib =

Iraqi footballer (born 1994)

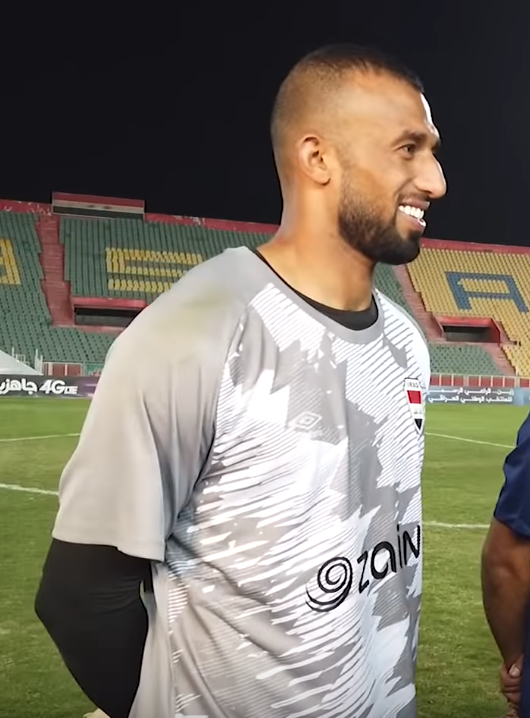
- Talib with Iraq in 2020

Personal information
- Full name: Fahad Talib Raheem
- Date of birth: 21 October 1994 (age 32)
- Place of birth: Baghdad, Iraq
- Height: 1.92 m (6 ft 4 in)
- Position: Goalkeeper

Team information
- Current team: Al Talaba SC
- Number: 98

Senior career*
Years	Team	Apps	(Gls)
2011–2019	Al-Quwa Al-Jawiya	140	(0)
2019–2020	Al-Zawraa		
2020–2023	Al-Quwa Al-Jawiya		
2023–2024	Sanat Naft Abadan	9	(0)
2024–	Al Talaba SC	0	(0)

International career^{‡}
2015–2016	Iraq U23	20	(0)
2017–	Iraq	21	(0)
- * Club domestic league appearances and goals as of 27 July 2026 ‡ National team caps and goals as of 15 July 2023

Fahad Talib Raheem (Arabic: فَهْد طَالِب رَحِيم; born 21 October 1994) is an Iraqi professional footballer who played as a goalkeeper for Iraq Stars League club Al Talaba and the Iraq national team.

== Club career ==
=== Youth career ===
The Goalkeeper has never played for any local team, but went straight into the Al Quwa Al-Jawiya’s youth system in his early teens and broke into the first team aged just 16 in 2011-12. Fahad followed in his father Talib Rahim and elder brother Ali’s footsteps when he joined the Blue Falcons. Growing up he would sit on the sidelines listening attentively to his father’s advice to Ali. Fahad was supervised by the goalkeeping coach Hashim Khamis, the ex-Iraq and Al-Jawiya goalkeeper, maintaining that the man the Al-Jawiya supporters knew as Al-Tayara (“The Airplane”) had been instrumental in his development, with the Jawiya faithful granting the old nickname of his mentor to their new keeper.

=== Al Quwa Al Jawiya ===
At the start of 2014–2015 season Fahad was regarded as the club's third-choice keeper behind Noor Sabri and Mohanad Qasim but the club's coach at the time, Nadhim Shaker, gave him his chance and he made the no.1 spot his. Fahad started his career with Iraqi giants Al Quwa al Jawiya and established himself as a first-team starter in the 2014–15 season. His Impressive performances led him to become a contender for the Olympic team squad. In the 2015/2016 season, Fahad became an instrumental part of the legendary season where Al Quwa Al Jawiya won the first-ever Iraqi FA Cup since 2003. Fahad played all matches of the 2016 AFC Cup as Al Quwa Al Jawiya became the first-ever Iraqi team to win an Asian club competition.

The following season, Fahad Talib was impressive once again as Al Quwa Al Jawiya won the Iraqi Premier League, and retained the AFC Cup.

Fahad Talib would once again be Jawiya's Number One as the Blue Falcons won a third straight AFC Cup in 2018, but fell short in the league as they finished 4 points behind first place Al Zawra'a. Fahad was suspended by the Asian Football Federation due to doping, while the player claims it was due to taking a "weight loss substance". Fahad returned in June after he served his ban from all football activities

=== Al Zawra'a ===
Fahad Talib moved to reigning champions Al Zawra'a ahead of the 2019–20 season, due to disagreements with Al Jawiya coach Ayoub Odisho. Fahad's tenure would be short-lived as the 2019–20 Iraqi Premier League was first suspended due to the 2019–2021 Iraqi protests, the league shortly resumed before being suspended again due to the COVID-19 pandemic, before being ultimately canceled

Fahad stated that the "experience with Al Zawra'a was very important to me, and I did not regret it"

=== Return to Al Jawiya ===
Fahad Talib rejoined Al Quwa Al Jawiya following his stint with Al Zawra'a in June 2020, signing a 2-year contract. The player won the league title in his first season back in 2020–2021, and followed it up with a cup win to secure the domestic double. Fahad also took part in the Asian Champions League, keeping two clean sheets as his side finished bottom of their group.

In 2021-2022 Fahad Talib also took part in the Asian Champions League, as his team finished third with 7 points in their group. The team finished as runners-up in the 2021–22 Iraqi Premier League as well as the next season in the 2022–23 Iraqi Premier League season. Fahad suffered an ACL tear in March 2022, in which he received surgery to repair it in Lebanon.

=== Sanat Naft Abadan ===
In July 2023, Fahad announced he reached a verbal agreement with the Iranian side Sanat Naft Abadan F.C. to represent them in the 2023–24 Persian Gulf Pro League, marking his first venture outside of Iraq. He made his debut on October 8 against Esteghlal F.C. He played a further 8 matches for the Persian club, keeping one clean-sheet before leaving the club by mutual consent.

=== Al Talaba ===
Following his venture in Iran, Talib returned to Baghdad, this time with Al-Talaba, to finish out the 2023-2024 season, however injury prevented him from featuring in any matches. In September 2024 he renewed his contract to stay at the club for the following season.

== International career ==
=== U-23 team ===
The man who displaced Noor Sabri as Air Force FC's No.1 keeper has been Abdul-Ghani Shahad's preferred first choice with the Olympic team from the first day he took charge; Talib started all but one of Iraq's ten 2016 Olympic qualifying matches.

Talib was the starting goalkeeper for Iraq U-23 in the 2016 AFC U-23 Championship in Qatar. Iraq went on to finish 3rd and win the bronze medal. They qualified for the 2016 Summer Olympics.

Talib lost his place in the Olympic team to Mohammed Hameed, Fahad was present in the Olympics as the second goalkeeper but was an unused substitute in all three matches as Iraq crashed out of the group stage.

=== Senior team ===
Talib was called up to the senior Iraq squad for a 2018 FIFA World Cup qualifier against Vietnam in March 2016. He made his debut on June 1, 2017 in a friendly match vs Jordan. He played 45 minutes and kept a clean sheet.

Fahad was part of the Iraqi squad that won the 25th Arabian Gulf Cup however he was an unused substitute in all of the tournament's matches.

Fahad was part of the Iraqi squad in the 2023 AFC Asian Cup. He was unused in the group stage and then suffered an injury before the round of 16 vs Jordan, where Iraq lost 3-2 and were eliminated

== Honours ==
Al-Quwa Al-Jawiya

- Iraqi Premier League: 2016–17, 2020–21
- Iraq FA Cup: 2015–16, 2020–21
- AFC Cup: 2016, 2017, 2018

Iraq

- Arabian Gulf Cup: 2023
