= 2001 Iraqi Perseverance Cup =

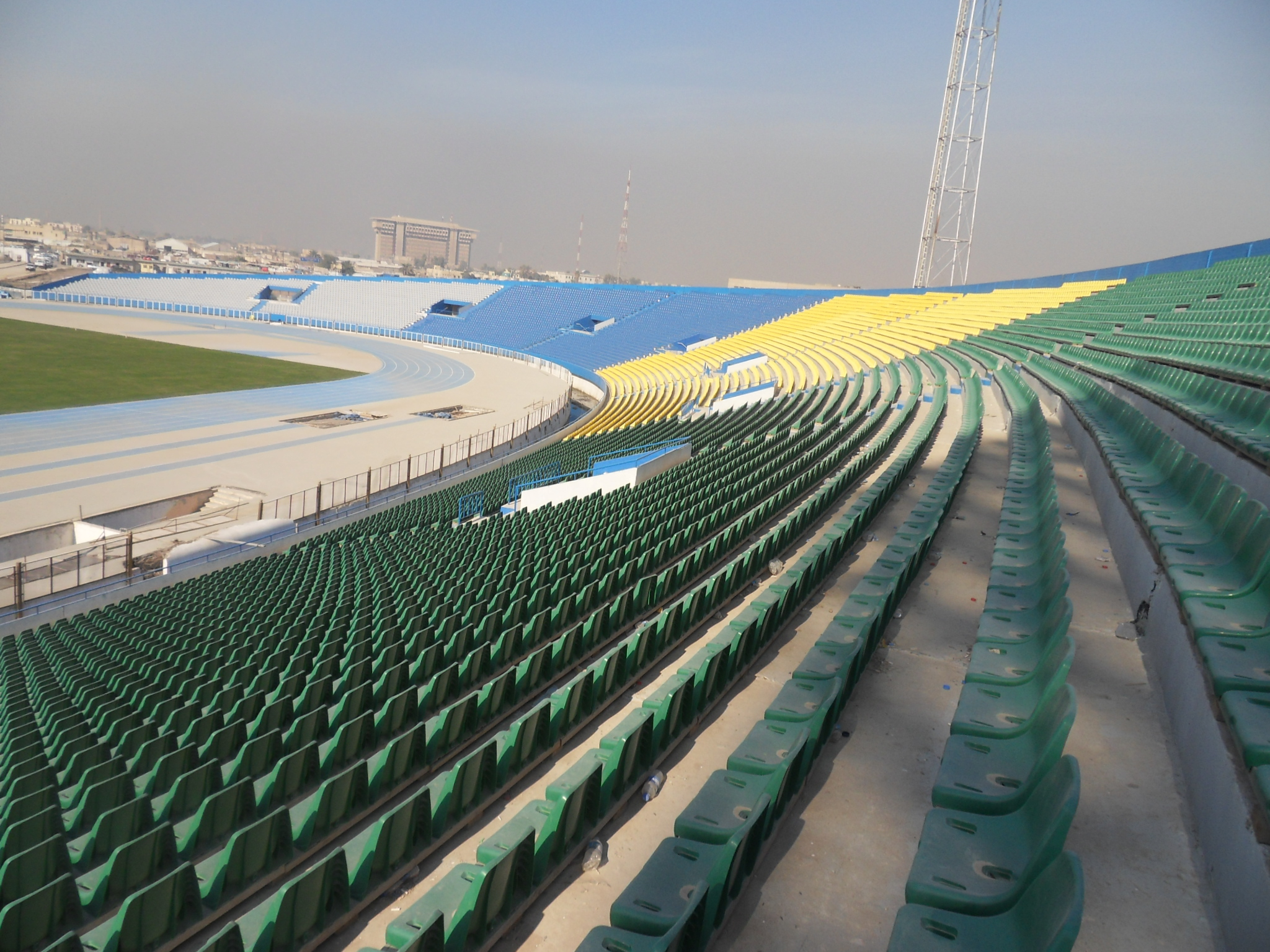
- The match took place at Al-Shaab Stadium
Al-Zawraa	Al-Quwa Al-Jawiya
0	1
- Date: 17 September 2001
- Venue: Al-Shaab Stadium, Baghdad
- Referee: Sabah Qasim

The 2001 Iraqi Perseverance Cup (Arabic: كأس المثابرة العراقي 2001) was the 6th edition of the Iraqi Super Cup. The match was contested between Baghdad rivals Al-Zawraa and Al-Quwa Al-Jawiya at Al-Shaab Stadium in Baghdad. It was played on 17 September 2001 as a curtain-raiser to the 2001–02 season. Al-Quwa Al-Jawiya won their second Super Cup title, winning the match 1–0.

== Match ==
=== Details ===
17 September 2001

Al-Zawraa	0–1	Al-Quwa Al-Jawiya
		Abdul-Khaliq 62'

Al-Shaab Stadium, Baghdad
Referee: Sabah Qasim

Iraqi Super Cup
2001 winner
Al-Quwa Al-Jawiya
2nd title
