= 1996–97 Iraqi Premier League =

Iraqi Premier League
- Season: 1996–97
- Champions: Al-Quwa Al-Jawiya (4th title)
- Relegated: Al-Karkh; Al-Kadhimiya; Al-Ramadi
- 1998–99 Asian Club Championship: Al-Quwa Al-Jawiya
- 1998–99 Asian Cup Winners' Cup: Al-Talaba
- Top goalscorer: Ali Hashim (19 goals)

The 1996–97 Iraqi Premier League was the 23rd season of the competition since its foundation in 1974. The name of the league was changed from Iraqi Advanced League to Iraqi Premier League. The league title was won by Al-Quwa Al-Jawiya for the fourth time. They also won the Iraq FA Cup, the Umm al-Ma'arik Championship and the Iraqi Perseverance Cup in this season, completing the first ever domestic quadruple in Iraqi football history.

== League table ==
Pos	Team	Pld	W	D	L	GF	GA	GD	Pts	Qualification or relegation
1	Al-Quwa Al-Jawiya (C)	30	22	3	5	63	24	+39	69	1998–99 Asian Club Championship
2	Al-Zawraa	30	20	7	3	76	24	+52	67	
3	Al-Talaba	30	17	9	4	58	17	+41	60	1998–99 Asian Cup Winners' Cup (Note: Although Al-Shorta were runners-up of the Iraq FA Cup (won by Al-Quwa Al-Jawiya), the IFA decided to give the Cup Winners' Cup slot to the league's third-placed team Al-Talaba.)
4	Al-Najaf	30	18	5	7	52	26	+26	59	
5	Al-Shorta	30	12	10	8	48	33	+15	46	
6	Al-Mosul	30	12	7	11	38	48	−10	43	
7	Samarra	30	10	9	11	36	45	−9	39	
8	Al-Minaa	30	9	10	11	22	32	−10	37	
9	Al-Naft	30	9	9	12	33	34	−1	36	
10	Salahaddin	30	8	10	12	27	39	−12	34	
11	Al-Kut	30	8	7	15	34	43	−9	31	
12	Al-Sinaa	30	7	8	15	21	42	−21	29	
13	Al-Sulaikh	30	7	7	16	26	45	−19	28	
14	Al-Karkh (R)	30	6	9	15	24	51	−27	27	Relegation to the Iraqi First Division League
15	Al-Kadhimiya (R)	30	6	8	16	20	35	−15	26	Relegation to the Iraqi First Division League
16	Al-Ramadi (R)	30	5	10	15	19	59	−40	25	Relegation to the Iraqi First Division League

Source: Ali Al-Sabti Archive
(C) Champions; (R) Relegated

== Results ==
Home \ Away	KDH	KAR	KUT	MIN	MSL	NFT	NJF	QWJ	RMA	SHR	SIN	SLK	TLB	ZWR	SAL	SMR
Al-Kadhimiya		0–0	3–0	0–0	2–1	0–1	0–2	0–2	1–1	1–1	0–0	1–0	1–1	1–3	1–0	2–1
Al-Karkh	0–2		1–2	1–0	2–2	0–1	1–4	0–2	5–0	1–1	0–0	1–1	0–2	0–6	1–0	1–1
Al-Kut	2–0	1–0		3–0	2–0	1–0	0–1	1–2	0–1	1–1	0–0	4–3	0–1	1–2	1–0	1–1
Al-Minaa	1–0	1–1	2–1		2–0	0–1	2–1	0–1	1–0	0–0	1–0	1–0	1–1	1–1	1–0	0–3 (Note: The Al-Minaa–Samarra match originally ended as a 1–0 win for Al-Minaa but was changed to a 3–0 win for Samarra due to Al-Minaa fielding the ineligible player Ali Al-Diwan.)
Al-Mosul	2–1	4–1	3–2	2–2		2–1	0–2	0–3	4–0	1–0	1–0	2–1	0–3	3–2	3–2	2–1
Al-Naft	3–0	3–3	1–1	0–0	0–1		0–1	0–0	3–1	1–2	1–2	3–0	0–2	0–4	2–2	2–5
Al-Najaf	1–0	1–0	2–1	3–1	4–0	1–1		2–1	2–1	1–2	1–0	3–0	1–0	2–2	3–0	3–0
Al-Quwa Al-Jawiya	2–1	2–0	3–0	3–0	4–1	2–0	2–1		5–0	1–2	3–3	4–1	1–2	1–0	0–1	1–0
Al-Ramadi	2–1	2–1	1–1	1–0	1–1	0–2	1–1	0–3		0–4	0–0	2–2	1–0	0–4	0–0	1–1
Al-Shorta	1–1	0–0	2–1	1–0	1–1	1–1	3–2	1–2	4–0		3–1	0–0	3–2	0–2	5–1	5–0
Al-Sinaa	1–0	2–0	3–1	0–1	1–1	1–0	1–0	1–2	0–0	2–1		1–3	0–5	0–3	0–1	0–2
Al-Sulaikh	1–0	1–2	2–1	2–1	0–0	0–3	1–3	1–3	1–1	2–1	0–0		0–1	1–2	0–1	1–0
Al-Talaba	1–0	4–0	1–1	3–0	3–0	1–1	2–1	1–1	5–0	3–0	5–0	0–0		1–1	3–0	4–2
Al-Zawraa	4–1	6–0	3–1	1–1	3–0	1–0	2–2	5–3	2–0	1–0	4–1	3–1	1–0		1–1	6–0
Salahaddin	0–0	0–1	1–1	1–1	1–1	0–2	1–0	0–1	3–1	2–1	2–1	1–0	1–1	1–1		2–2
Samarra	1–0	0–1	3–2	1–1	1–0	0–0	1–1	0–3	2–1	2–2	1–0	0–1	0–0	1–0	4–2	

Source: Ali Al-Sabti Archive
Legend: Blue = home team win; Yellow = draw; Red = away team win.

== Season statistics ==
=== Top scorers ===
Pos	Scorer	Goals	Team
1	Ali Hashim	19	Al-Najaf
2	Sahib Abbas	17	Al-Zawraa
3	Sabah Jeayer	12	Al-Quwa Al-Jawiya

=== Hat-tricks ===
Player	For	Against	Result	Date
(Iraq) Sahib Abbas^{6}	Al-Zawraa	Al-Karkh	6–0	18 October 1996
(Iraq) Naeem Saddam	Al-Zawraa	Samarra	6–0	1 November 1996
(Iraq) Hussam Fawzi	Al-Zawraa	Al-Sulaikh	3–1	15 November 1996
(Iraq) Haidar Najim	Al-Najaf	Samarra	3–0	14 December 1996
(Iraq) Sahib Abbas	Al-Zawraa	Al-Sinaa	3–0	27 December 1996
(Iraq) Alaa Kadhim	Al-Talaba	Al-Ramadi	5–0	1 February 1997
(Iraq) Alaa Kadhim	Al-Talaba	Al-Karkh	4–0	8 March 1997
(Iraq) Mahmoud Karim	Al-Talaba	Al-Sinaa	5–0	11 April 1997
(Iraq) Ahmed Jadiea	Al-Karkh	Al-Ramadi	5–0	16 April 1997
(Iraq) Muayad Judi	Al-Zawraa	Al-Quwa Al-Jawiya	5–3	9 May 1997

Notes

^{6} Player scored 6 goals
