= 1998 Iraqi Perseverance Cup =

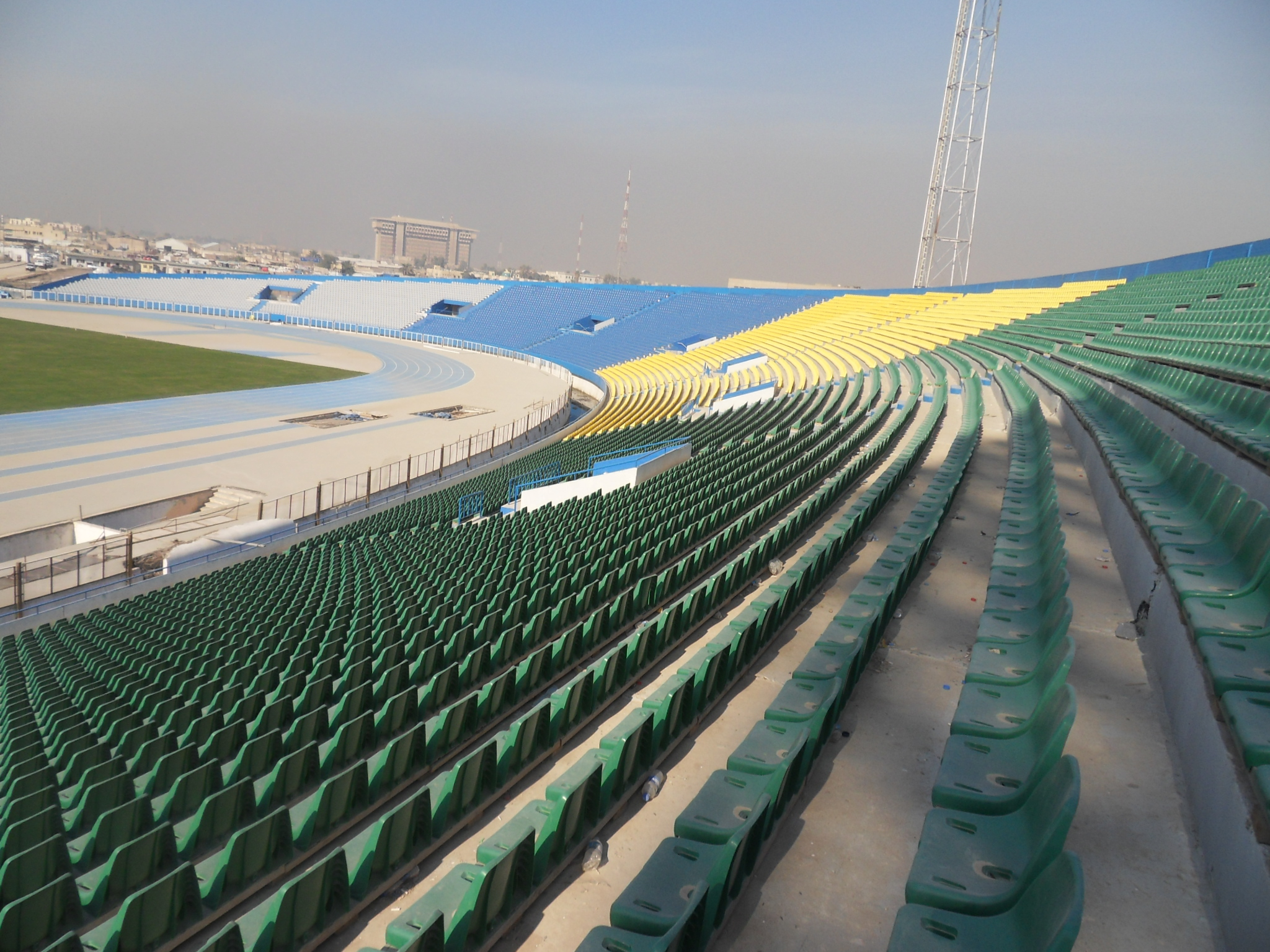
- The match took place at Al-Shaab Stadium
Al-Shorta	Al-Zawraa
0	1
- Date: 25 May 1998
- Venue: Al-Shaab Stadium, Baghdad
- Referee: Mahmoud Nouraddin

The 1998 Iraqi Perseverance Cup (Arabic: كأس المثابرة العراقي 1998) was the 3rd edition of the Iraqi Super Cup. The match was contested between Baghdad rivals Al-Shorta and Al-Zawraa at Al-Shaab Stadium in Baghdad. It was played on 25 May 1998 to bring an end to the 1997–98 season. Al-Zawraa won the game 1–0, earning their first Super Cup title.

== Match ==
=== Details ===
25 May 1998

Al-Shorta	0–1	Al-Zawraa
		Abdul-Jabar 88'

Al-Shaab Stadium, Baghdad
Referee: Mahmoud Nouraddin

Iraqi Super Cup
1998 winner
Al-Zawraa
1st title
