= 1986 Iraqi Perseverance Cup =

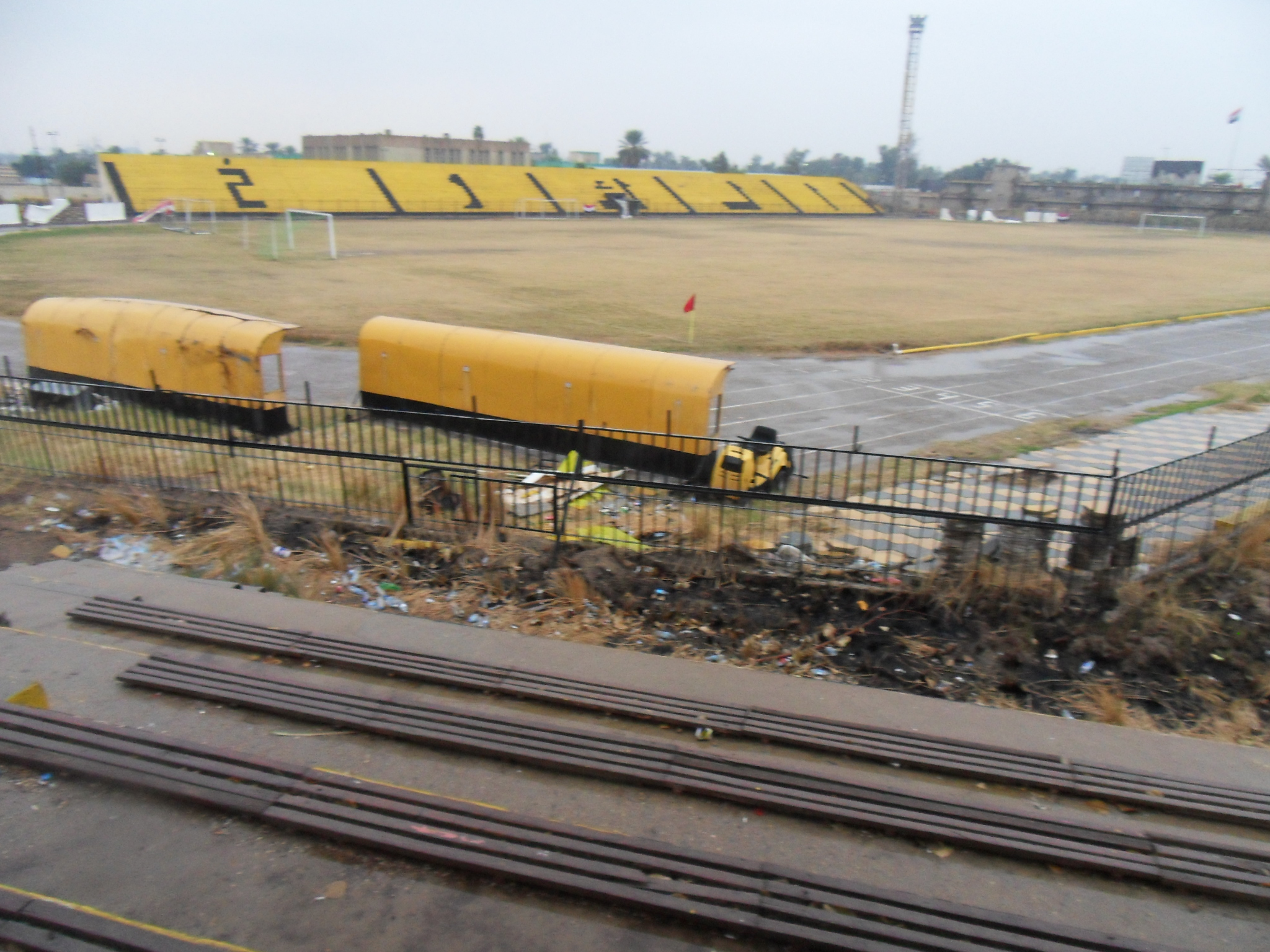
- Al-Rasheed Stadium in Baghdad hosted the match.
Al-Talaba	Al-Rasheed
1	2
- Date: 27 February 1986
- Venue: Al-Rasheed Stadium, Baghdad
- Referee: Salahaddin Mohammed Karim

The 1986 Iraqi Perseverance Cup (Arabic: كأس المثابرة العراقي 1986) was the 1st edition of the Iraqi Super Cup. The match was contested between the 1985–86 Iraqi National League winners and runners-up respectively, Al-Talaba and Al-Rasheed, at Al-Rasheed Stadium in Baghdad. It was played on 27 February 1986 to bring an end to the 1985–86 season. Al-Rasheed won the game 2–1.

== Match ==
=== Details ===
27 February 1986

Al-Talaba	1–2	Al-Rasheed
Saeed		Abid; Hashim

Al-Rasheed Stadium, Baghdad
Referee: Salahaddin Mohammed Karim

Iraqi Super Cup
1986 winner
Al-Rasheed
1st title
