= Ayoub Odisho =

Iraqi-Assyrian footballer and manager

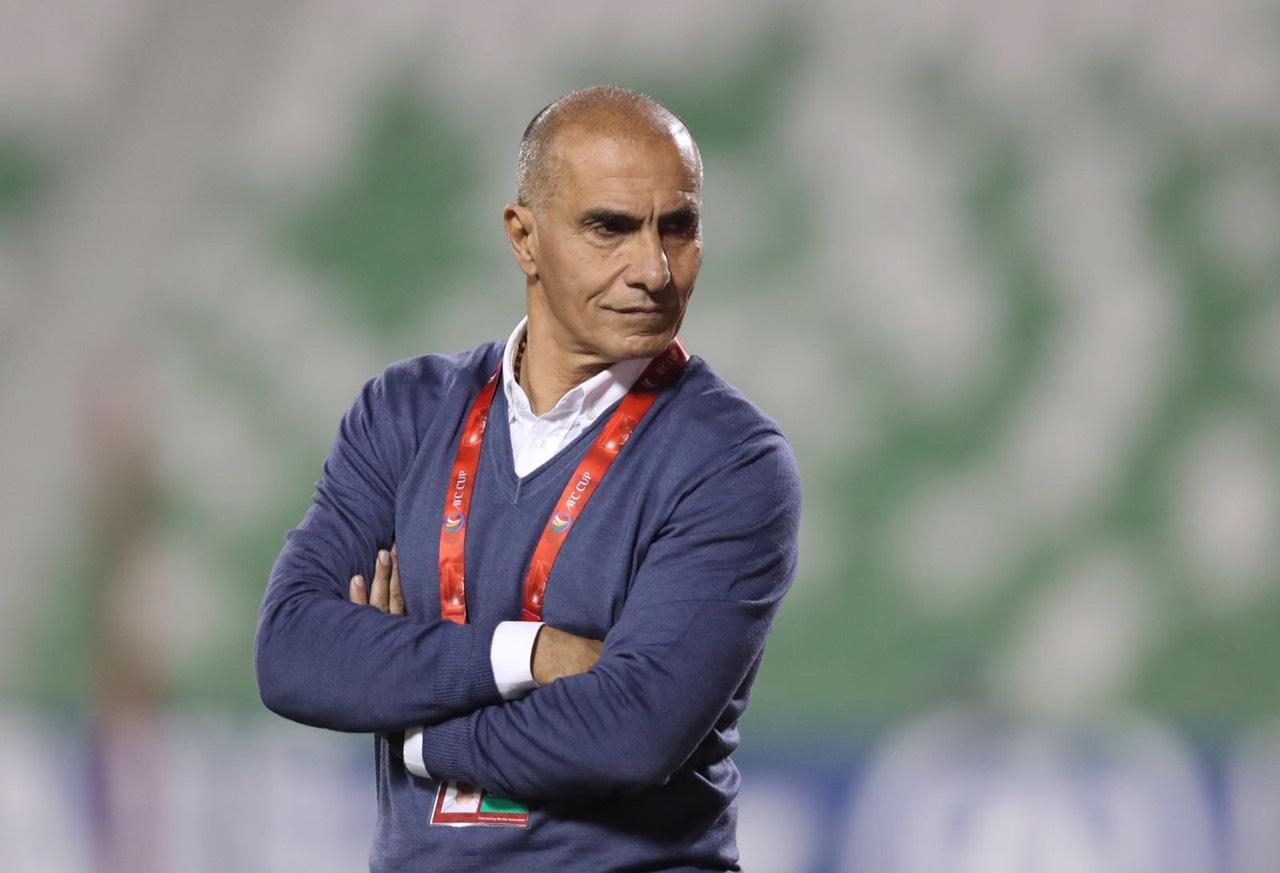
- Odisho in 2019

Personal information
- Full name: Ayoub Odisho Barjam
- Date of birth: 15 December 1960 (age 65)
- Place of birth: Habbaniyah, Al Anbar, Iraq
- Position: Defender

Youth career
- 1976–1977: Al-Athori

Senior career*
Years	Team	Apps	(Gls)
1977–1991	Al-Talaba		

International career
1979–1987	Iraq	38	

Managerial career
- 1991–1992: Al-Talaba (assistant)
- 1992–1993: Al-Talaba
- 1993–1995: Al-Talaba
- 1996: Al-Talaba
- 1996–1997: Al-Quwa Al-Jawiya
- 1997: Iraq
- 1997: Al-Shorta
- 1997–1998: Al-Talaba
- 1998: Al-Quwa Al-Jawiya
- 2000: Al-Quwa Al-Jawiya
- Salam Zgharta
- Al-Akhaa Al-Ahli Aley
- Al-Safa'
- 2009–2010: Al-Jaish
- 2010–2011: Erbil
- 2012–2013: Al-Quwa Al-Jawiya
- 2013–2015: Erbil
- 2015–2017: Al-Talaba
- 2017: Naft Al-Wasat
- 2017–2019: Al-Zawraa
- 2019–2021: Al-Quwa Al-Jawiya
- 2022–2023: Al-Zawraa
- 2023–2024: Al-Quwa Al-Jawiya
- * Club domestic league appearances and goals

Ayoub Odisho Barjam (Arabic: أيوب اوديشو; born 15 December 1960) is an Iraqi football manager/coach and former player.

== Playing career ==
Born to Assyrian parents, Ayoub was a tough tackling full-back who played for Al-Talaba during a playing career that spanned 14 years. The right-sided defender joined the Students club in 1976, making his debut in a 1–0 win over Al-Shurta a year later. He was one of the best defenders in the Iraqi league during the 1980s. He played alongside the likes of Hussein Saeed, Wathiq Aswad, Ali Hussein Shihab, Haris Mohammed and Adnan Dirjal during his career with the great club, helping Al-Talaba to three league titles in 1981, 1982, and 1986.

He made his international debut on 9 February 1979 in the 1–1 draw with East Germany in a friendly game in Baghdad and went on to make 38 appearances for Iraq, including playing at the 1982 Gulf Cup in the UAE and the Asian Games victory in New Delhi that same year but due to injuries a year on he lost his place in the side to Khalil Allawi. He made his last international appearance in a friendly with Bahrain in 1987.

=== International goals ===
Scores and results list Iraq's goal tally first.

No	Date	Venue	Opponent	Score	Result	Competition
1.	23 November 1982	Jawaharlal Nehru Stadium, New Delhi	Nepal	1–0	3–0	1982 Asian Games

== Coaching career ==
Odisho after retiring in 1991, he went on to coach Al-Talaba and Al-Quwa Al-Jawiya, leading Al-Quwa Al-Jawiya to four trophies in the 1996–97 season. He gave a live interview at the end of the 1997–98 Iraqi League season in which he said how happy he was that Al-Quwa Al Jawiya had won the league title, but midway through the interview, he heard that Al-Shorta had won the league with a last minute goal. He also had a lengthy spell in Lebanon managing Salam Zgharta, Al-Akhaa Ahli Aley and Safa FC. His last coaching job was at Arbil, which he stood down from in late 2011.

In October 2013, Odisho was appointed Erbil SC coach for his second stint with the club.

On 23 August 2017, Odisho joined Al-Zawra'a SC for two seasons. He led them in 62 games, winning 39 of them and winning the Iraqi league and the Iraqi super cup after a game against Al-Quwa Al-Jawiya.

=== Managerial statistics ===
As of 11 May 2023

Team	Nat	From	To	Record				
Team	Nat	From	To	G	W	D	L	Win %
Iraq	(Iraq)	June 1997	June 1997	2	1	0	1	50.00
Al-Jaish	(Syria)	8 July 2009	7 May 2010	34	21	6	7	61.76
Erbil SC	(Iraq)	15 June 2010	29 December 2011	83	53	17	13	63.86
Al-Quwa Al-Jawiya	(Iraq)	6 March 2012	25 March 2013	40	20	10	10	50.00
Erbil SC	(Iraq)	8 September 2013	25 April 2015	54	27	16	11	50.00
Al-Talaba	(Iraq)	6 June 2015	8 March 2017	45	19	16	10	42.22
Naft Al-Wasat	(Iraq)	15 March 2017	2 June 2017	8	4	3	1	50.00
Al-Zawraa	(Iraq)	23 August 2017	22 February 2019	73	46	23	4	63.01
Al-Quwa Al-Jawiya	(Iraq)	15 March 2019	1 August 2021	114	70	28	16	61.40
Al-Zawraa	(Iraq)	1 February 2022	11 May 2023	51	20	23	8	39.22
Total				504	281	142	81	55.75

== Honours ==
Player

Al-Talaba

- Iraqi Premier League: 1980–81, 1981–82, 1985–86

Iraq

- Asian Games: 1982

Manager

Al-Talaba

- Iraqi Premier League: 1992–93
- Baghdad Championship: 1995–96

Al-Quwa Al-Jawiya

- Iraqi Premier League: 1996–97, 2020–21
- Iraq FA Cup: 1996–97, 2020–21
- Baghdad Championship: 1996–97
- Iraqi Super Cup: 1997

Al-Zawraa

- Iraqi Premier League: 2017–18
- Iraqi Super Cup: 2017

Al-Jaish

- Syrian Premier League: 2009–10
