= Nazar Ashraf =

Iraqi footballer and coach

Personal information
- Full name: Nazar Ashraf Salman
- Date of birth: 2 November 1953 (age 73)
- Position: Forward

Team information
- Current team: Al-Quwa Al-Jawiya (Technical Advisor.)

Senior career*
| Years | Team | Apps | (Gls) |
| 1970–1975 | Al-Adhamiya | | |
| 1975-1988 | Al-Talaba | | |

International career
| 1977–1981 | Iraq | | (2) |

Managerial career
- 1995: Al-Talaba
- 1996–1998: Al-Talaba
- 1998–1999: Al-Quwa Al-Jawiya
- 1999: Iraq U23
- 2000: Al-Talaba
- 2001: Iraq U20
- 2001: Al-Talaba
- 2006: Al-Kahraba
- 2010: Zakho
- 2010–2012: Masafi Al-Wasat
- 2012–2013: Al-Talaba
- 2013–2014: Al Shorta (assistant)
- 2014–2016: Iraq (assistant)
- 2018–2019: Al-Talaba SC (assistant)
- 2021–: Al-Quwa Al-Jawiya (Technical Advisor.)
- * Club domestic league appearances and goals

Nazar Ashraf Salman (Arabic: نِزَار أَشْرَف سَلْمَان; born 2 November 1953) is a former Iraq national player and coach, who was the assistant coach of Iraq from 2014 to 2016. He also competed in the men's tournament at the 1980 Summer Olympics, where Iraq finished equal 5th.

== Career statistics ==
=== International goals ===
Scores and results list Iraq's goal tally first.

| No | Date | Venue | Opponent | Score | Result | Competition |
|---|---|---|---|---|---|---|
| 1. | 29 February 1980 | Al-Shaab Stadium, Baghdad | Poland | 1–0 | 1–0 | Friendly |
| 2. | 20 March 1980 | Al-Shaab Stadium, Baghdad | Syria | 1–0 | 1–0 | 1980 Olympics qualifiers |
| 3. | 31 March 1980 | Al-Shaab Stadium, Baghdad | Kuwait | 1–0 | 2–3 | 1980 Olympics qualifiers |
| 4. | 31 March 1980 | Al-Shaab Stadium, Baghdad | Kuwait | 2–0 | 2–3 | 1980 Olympics qualifiers |
| 5. | 30 March 1981 | Prince Mohamed bin Fahd Stadium, Riyadh | Syria | 1–0 | 2–1 | 1982 FIFA World Cup qualification |
