= 2021 Iraqi Super Cup =

Football match

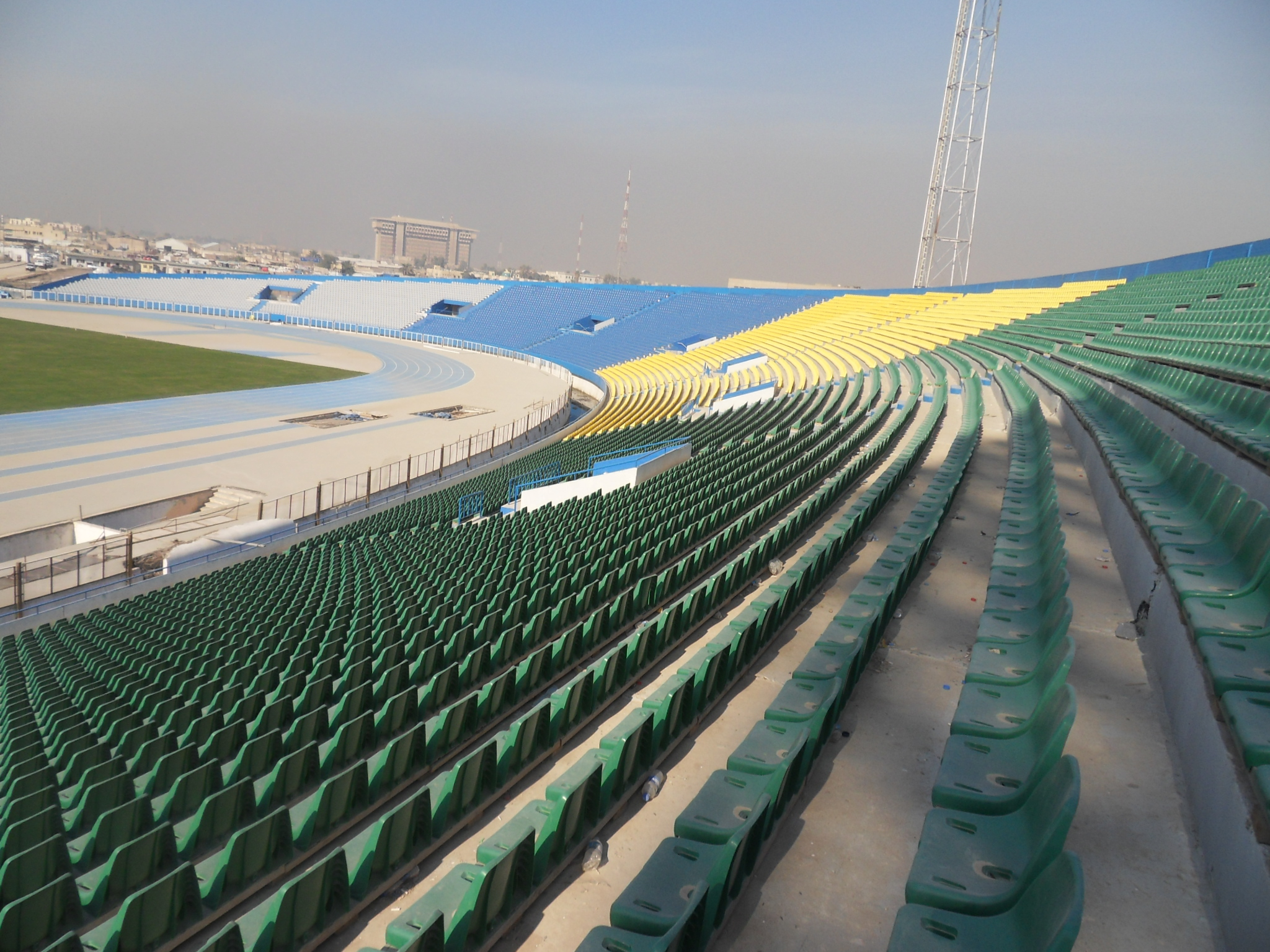
- The match took place at Al-Shaab Stadium
Al-Quwa Al-Jawiya	Al-Zawraa
0	1
- Date: 17 September 2021
- Venue: Al-Shaab Stadium, Baghdad
- Referee: Mohanad Qasim
- Attendance: 0 (Note: The match was played behind closed doors due to the COVID-19 pandemic in Iraq.)

The 2021 Iraqi Super Cup was the 10th edition of the Iraqi Super Cup. It was held on 17 September 2021 between the 2020–21 Iraqi Premier League champions and FA Cup winners Al-Quwa Al-Jawiya and the league's runners-up Al-Zawraa. This was Al-Quwa Al-Jawiya's sixth Super Cup appearance overall while Al-Zawraa extended their record to eight appearances. Al-Zawraa won the match 1–0 with a goal from Mazin Fayyadh to clinch a record fifth Super Cup title.

== Match ==
=== Details ===
17 September 2021
20:00 UTC+03:00

Al-Quwa Al-Jawiya	0–1	Al-Zawraa
		Fayyadh 52'

Al-Shaab Stadium, Baghdad
Attendance: 0
Referee: Mohanad Qasim

Al-Quwa Al-Jawiya	Al-Zawraa

GK	1	(Iraq) Fahad Talib
RWB	13	(Jordan) Ihsan Haddad		(substituted off) 80'
CB	5	(Iraq) Maitham Jabbar	(yellow card) 50'
CB	2	(Iraq) Ahmad Ibrahim
CB	3	(Togo) Wilson Akakpo	(yellow card) 10'
LWB	15	(Iraq) Dhurgham Ismail		(substituted off) 56'
RM	8	(Iraq) Ibrahim Bayesh
CM	25	(Iraq) Mohammed Ali Abbood
CM	55	(Iraq) Safaa Hadi	(yellow card) 64'	(substituted off) 86'
LM	14	(Iraq) Hussein Jabbar		(substituted off) 56'
CF	10	(Iraq) Hammadi Ahmed (c)		(substituted off) 56'
Substitutes:
GK	95	(Iraq) Mohammed Salih
DF	6	(Iraq) Sameh Saeed		(substituted in) 86'
DF	20	(Iraq) Ali Kadhim
DF	24	(Iraq) Hassan Raed
DF	88	(Iraq) Mustafa Moayad		(substituted in) 80'
MF	7	(Iraq) Shareef Abdul-Kadhim		(substituted in) 56'
MF	11	(Iraq) Humam Tariq		(substituted in) 56'
MF	19	(Iraq) Ali Mohsen
FW	90	(Iraq) Ahmed Zamel		(substituted in) 56'
Manager:
(Iraq) Ahmed Khalaf

GK	31	(Iraq) Ali Yasin
RB	17	(Iraq) Alaa Mhawi
CB	16	(Syria) Zaher Midani
CB	29	(Iraq) Abbas Qasim
LB	6	(Iraq) Hussam Kadhim		(substituted off) 90'
DM	55	(Iraq) Saad Abdul-Amir
CM	7	(Iraq) Ahmad Fadhel (c)		(substituted off) 72'
CM	10	(Iraq) Mohammed Salih	(yellow card) 78'
RM	9	(Iraq) Mazin Fayyadh	(yellow card) 53'	(substituted off) 80'
LM	19	(Iraq) Mahdi Kamel		(substituted off) 72'
CF	99	(Algeria) Lahouari Touil		(substituted off) 90'
Substitutes:
GK	20	(Iraq) Alaa Gatea
DF	3	(Iraq) Ahmed Maknzi		(substituted in) 90'
DF	15	(Mauritania) Hassan Houbeib		(substituted in) 90'
DF	21	(Iraq) Haidar Ahmed
MF	5	(Iraq) Muntadher Mohammed		(substituted in) 80'
MF	23	(Iraq) Moayad Abdul-Basit		(substituted in) 72'
MF	24	(Iraq) Mohammed Ridha	(yellow card) 74'	(substituted in) 72'
MF	25	(Iraq) Ali Raheem
FW	11	(Iraq) Ahmed Sartib
Manager:
(Iraq) Essam Hamad

Assistant referees:
Wathiq Modalil
Hussein Falah
Fourth official:
Ahmed Kadhim

Match rules

- 90 minutes.
- Penalty shoot-out if scores level.
- Nine named substitutes.
- Maximum of five substitutions.

Iraqi Super Cup
2021 winner
Al-Zawraa
5th title
