= Al-Talaba SC =

Al-Talaba
- Full name: Al-Talaba Sports Club
- Nickname: Al-Aneeq (The Elegant)
- Founded: 17 December 1969; 56 years ago (as Jami'at Baghdad)
- Ground: Al-Madina Stadium (league); Al-Talaba Stadium (cup)
- Capacity: 32,000 (league); 10,000 (cup)
- President: Salah Hadi Al-Fatlawi
- Coach: Alireza Mansourian
- League: Iraq Stars League
- 2025–26: Iraq Stars League, 6th of 20
Home colours	Away colours

Al-Talaba Sports Club (Arabic: نادي الطلبة الرياضي, lit. ''Students Sports Club'') is an Iraqi professional sports club based in Al-Rusafa, Baghdad. Its football team competes in the Iraq Stars League, the top flight of Iraqi football. Founded in 1969, the club was named Al-Jamiea (lit. 'University') but became known as Al-Talaba ahead of the 1978–79 season after being merged with a new club of the same name.

Al-Talaba is one of Iraq's most successful teams, having won five Iraq Stars League titles, most recently in the 2001–02 season, as well as two Iraq FA Cup titles and one Iraqi Super Cup title. Al-Talaba helped to establish the Baghdad Championship in 1991 and went on to win the competition a joint-record three times. Al-Talaba's best achievements in international football include finishing fourth at the 1986 Asian Club Championship, finishing as runners-up of the 1995–96 Asian Cup Winners' Cup and finishing fourth at the 1998–99 Asian Cup Winners' Cup.

The club was owned by the National Union of Iraqi Students until 1993, when the club was attached to the Ministry of Higher Education and Scientific Research with the minister being the honorary president of the club. The team is popularly nicknamed "Al-Aneeq" (lit. 'The Elegant') and competes in Baghdad derbies with rivals Al-Zawraa, Al-Quwa Al-Jawiya and Al-Shorta.

== History ==
=== Origins (1961–1969) ===
In 1961, the University of Baghdad formed a football team made of the best football-playing students in the university, under the name of Montakhab Jami'at Baghdad (University of Baghdad Select XI), to compete in the 1960–61 Iraq Central FA Second Division, the second-tier league in the Baghdad region. The team was eliminated in the first round after losing 2–1 to the Railway Workers' Union on 22 February 1961. The team participated in the 1964 Republic Championship and also entered the Universities of Iraq League. The first president of the team was Hassan Kanah and the first technical staff consisted of the manager, Ghani Askar, and his two assistants, Moayad Al-Badri and Sami Al-Saffar.

=== Formation of Al-Jamiea (1969–1978) ===
On 17 December 1969, the Jami'at Baghdad team was formed as the University of Baghdad re-entered the official Iraq Football Association (IFA) league pyramid. By a special resolution from the IFA, the team's first participation was in the regional second tier without needing to compete in either the third or fourth tiers. In their first season, 1970–71, the team under the management of Thamir Muhsin finished top of the second-tier league and were promoted to the Iraq Central FA First Division. However, in the 1971–72 season, they finished in last place and were relegated back to the second-tier. In 1974, the team was banned from competing in the Iraq FA Baghdad Cup competition due to events that took place in, and their withdrawal from, their match against Kahrabaa Al-Wusta B in a second-tier league game.

After three seasons, Muhsin left the team and Jamal Salih became the new manager, and the Jami'at Baghdad team became known as Al-Jamiea Sports Club with the introduction of the national club system in Iraq. Jamal Salih led the team to promotion to the top division in the 1974–75 season, after which the club acquired its own headquarters and elected an administrative body. After finishing eighth in their first Iraqi National League top-flight season in 1975–76, Al-Jamiea were the runners-up in the 1976–77 season, finishing five points behind the league leaders Al-Zawra'a.

=== Merger to become Al-Talaba (1978–1980) ===
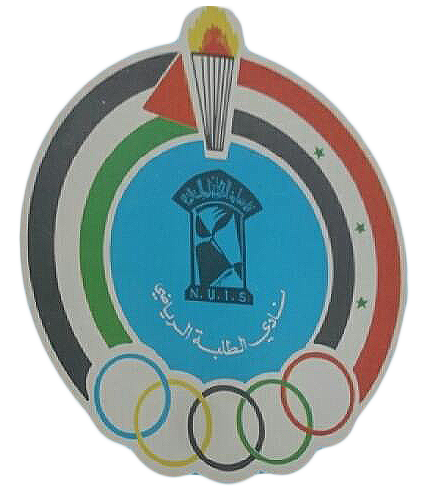
Al-Talaba's first logo in 1979.

On 27 December 1977, a new club named Al-Talaba Sports Club (which translates to The Students) was formed under the same institution as Al-Jamiea Sports Club. Less than a year later, ahead of the 1978–79 season, the Ministry of Youth and Sports decided to merge the two clubs in order to unify the institution's sporting activity, with the merger club taking the name of Al-Talaba and retaining Al-Jamiea's place in the top division. The club took the Volleyball Training Centre on Al-Maghrib Street in Baghdad as its headquarters. Mohammed Debdeb, the president of the National Union of Iraqi Students, was named president of the club and Hadib Majhoul was named as vice-president, while nine other board members were also named.

The board decided to replace manager Jamal Salih with Abdul Wahab Abdul Qadir, who led the team through the 1978–79 season. Al-Talaba finished in third place in the league, an improvement on Al-Jamiea's eighth-place finish the previous season. For the first time, an Al-Talaba player was among the league's top three goalscorers with Hussein Saeed scoring six goals and Haris Mohammed scoring five. Al-Talaba were disqualified from the 1978–79 Iraq FA Cup due to participating in an Arab University tournament without the approval of the Iraq Football Association. In 1979, Al-Talaba represented Iraq at the 1979 Summer Universiade in Mexico, finishing in 17th place out of 26 teams.

In the 1979–80 Iraqi National League, under the management of Khalaf Hassan, Al-Talaba finished in third place again with 27 points. Two of their most significant wins that season were beating the eventual league champions, Al-Shorta, 2–0 in the second round of matches on 26 September 1979 and beating Al-Tayaran 1–0 in the 20th round on 24 April 1980. In the 1979–80 Iraq FA Cup, Al-Talaba reached the final for the first time but they were defeated on 7 April 1980 by Al-Jaish 4–2 on penalties after drawing 1–1.

=== Golden years (1980–1986) ===
Under the management of Ammo Baba, known as the "Sheikh of Coaches", Al-Talaba won their first Premier League title in the 1980–81 season (while it was known as the National League). Before the last round of matches, Al-Talaba had 17 points and Al-Shorta had 15. Al-Talaba avoiding defeat in the last round or Al-Shorta failing to win would secure the title for Al-Talaba but, in the last match, they lost 1–2 against Al-Tayaran and Al-Shorta won 3–0 against Al-Zawra'a to create a tie on points (17) and goal difference (+14), which was the first time such a phenomenon had happened in Iraqi football. Al-Talaba were awarded the title on number of wins as they had eight wins and Al-Shorta had six. Hussein Saeed was the top goalscorer of the league with eleven goals.

After achieving their first league title, Al-Talaba succeeded in winning it again in the 1981–82 season under Jamal Salih. They finished the season as the league leaders with 34 points, two points ahead of second-placed Al-Tayaran. Hussein Saeed was the second top goalscorer with eleven goals behind Al-Zawra'a's Thamir Yousif, who scored fourteen.

In the 1982–83 season, Akram Salman was appointed as the team's new manager. Al-Talaba started the season with confidence having won the league in the last two seasons, but finished in second place, only one point behind the league leaders, Salahaddin. Salahaddin were undefeated in the league while Al-Talaba had a single loss, by 2–0 loss to Al-Sinaa in the second round of matches. The championship was decided in the last match of the season when Al-Talaba met Salahaddin with only one point between them, so Salahaddin needed a win or a draw to secure the title. Al-Talaba scored first and dominated the match until, in the last thirty minutes, Salahaddin managed to equalise. The score remained 1–1, which won Salahaddin the championship for the first time in their history. Hussein Saeed was the top goalscorer with 17 goals, eight goals ahead of another Al-Talaba player, Rahim Hameed.

Al-Talaba again finished second in the 1983–84, with 36 points, three behind league leaders, Al-Jaish. In 1984, Al-Talaba won its first international club competition, the 1984 Stafford Challenge Cup, winning four games and drawing one out of the five games they played in the tournament, which was hosted in Bangalore, India.

The 1984–85 Iraqi National League was abandoned midway through due to a perceived decline in public interest, described as becoming "non-existent", after the performances of the Iraq national football team in the 1986 FIFA World Cup qualification (AFC) and winning the 1985 Arab Cup and the 1985 Arab Games. Al-Talaba were in third place with 29 points before the stoppage. They then participated in the Al-Rasheed Cup which was set up by Al-Rasheed after the abandonment of the league. The Al-Rasheed Cup contained twelve of the fourteen top division clubs as well as four lower division clubs. Al-Talaba reached the quarterfinals of the tournament but were knocked out by the eventual winners Al-Rasheed.

After Al-Rasheed was promoted to the top division, most of Iraq's national team players signed for them, which made it difficult for the other teams to compete. Even so, in the 1985–86 Iraqi National League and under the management of Yahya Alwan, Al-Talaba won their third league title against all expectations. They finished the season with 25 points, two points ahead of the favourites Al-Rasheed. On 27 December 1985, one of the most important matches of the season, which could have decided the championship, was played between Al-Talaba and Al-Rasheed in front of 50,000 spectators at the Al-Shaab Stadium. The match ended in a 1–0 win for Al-Talaba with the goal being from a penalty taken by Hussein Saeed in the 63rd minute. Saeed was the season's joint top goalscorer along with Ahmed Radhi and Rahim Hameed. Al-Talaba participated in the 1986 Asian Club Championship where they reached the final round but finished last in the table with a single point. Al-Talaba also participated in the Saddam International Tournament in 1986, hosted in Baghdad, but finished third in their group and failed to reach the semi-finals. By winning the league, Al-Talaba qualified for the 1986 Iraqi Perseverance Cup but were defeated 2–1 by Al-Rasheed.

=== Ups and downs (1986–1992) ===
Due to managerial changes and instability, the 1986–87 Iraqi National League ended with Al-Talaba in sixth place, having totaled 49 points, under the consecutive management of Ahmed Subhi, Yahya Alwan and Jamal Salih. The season after, Al-Talaba under the management of Yousif Abdul-Ameer finished in eighth place with only 30 points. After that season, they participated in the Saddam Qadisiya Championship (a tournament for the four Popular Teams of Baghdad) but failed to win the tournament.

Al-Talaba returned to form under the management of Jamal Ali in the 1988–89 season, which was played in a different format to previous seasons. They finished fourth in the Baghdad Group, just ahead of Al-Shorta, to qualify for the final tournament, where they finished second in Group 1, behind Al-Zawraa, to qualify for the semi-finals. In the semi-finals, Al-Talaba defeated Al-Tayaran 6–5 on penalties after a 1–1 draw. In the final, Al-Talaba faced their rivals, Al-Rasheed, at the Al-Shaab Stadium. The match ended 1–1 at full time with their goal scored by Ali Hussein. It went to penalties where Hussein Saeed missed his penalty and enabled Al-Rasheed to win 5–4. That season, Al-Talaba also finished as runners-up in the Al-Intisar Cup, behind Al-Quwa Al-Jawiya.

In the 1989–90 Iraqi National League, which returned to the normal league format, Al-Talaba finished in sixth place with 31 points, having won twelve matches, drawn seven and lost seven. In the cup, they reached the fifth round when they won at home to Al-Sulaikh 1–0 and lost 3–1 away. This was Hussein Saeed's final season with Al-Talaba before he retired. In the next season, under the management of the club's first foreign coach, Eddie Firmani, and Yahya Alwan, they finished second with 41 points.

In the 1991–92 season, Al-Talaba finished in fourth place with 55 points. The vice-president of Al-Talaba, Salim Rasheed, organised a competition called the Umm al-Ma'arik Championship, meaning Mother of all Battles Championship, in which only the top six teams in the league could participate with all the matches being played at the Al-Shaab Stadium. Al-Talaba won their first match against Al-Shorta 1–0 and lost their second match against Al-Quwa Al-Jawiya 1–0, qualifying them for the semi-finals where they lost to Al-Zawra'a 1–0 after an early goal by Mohammed Jassim Mahdi. In the third-place match, Al-Talaba faced Al-Karkh whom they defeated 4–3 on penalties after a 2–2 draw. The 1st Umm al-Ma'arik Championship ended with Al-Zawra'a as winners.

=== Stability and Asian prominence (1992–2001) ===

2nd Umm al-Ma'arik Championship Final starting lineup

During the longest season in Iraqi football, the 1992–93 season, when every club played 69 matches, Al-Talaba had Yahya Alwan as their manager in the first stage of the league, in which they won 14 matches, drawn seven and lost two, 1–0 against Kirkuk and the same score against Samarra. They completed the stage in third place with 35 points. Before the start of the second stage, Al-Talaba signed Ayoub Odisho as their new manager, and he led them through the second stage to have exactly the same statistics as the first one, finishing with 70 points and in second place. In the third stage, the team won 18 matches, drew four and lost only once against Al-Khutoot. After 69 matches, Al-Talaba finished top of the league with 110 points, having scored 130 goals and conceded 34. In the 2nd Umm al-Ma'arik Championship which was organised by the Iraq FA, Al-Talaba finished the group stage as the Group Two leaders with four points. In the semi-finals, they had to face Al-Zawra'a in a match which was considered a replay of the 1991 semi-final which Al-Zawra'a won 1–0. In this match, Al-Talaba won 3–2 with a winning goal in the 100th minute during extra time. In the final against Al-Quwa Al-Jawiya, the match ended in a 0–0 draw which led to extra time when Alaa Kadhim scored the winning goal in the 104th minute. In the 1992–93 Iraq FA Cup, Al-Talaba reached the final after defeating Haifa, Salahaddin, Al-Salam and Samarra. In the final, they lost to Al-Zawra'a 2–1.

After almost achieving a treble in the 1992–93 season, Al-Talaba were managed by Hussein Saeed in the first half of the 1993–94 season and Ayoub Odisho in the second; they finished in third place with 75 points. In the 3rd Umm al-Ma'arik Championship, they came second in the Group One table behind Al-Quwa Al-Jawiya. In the semi-finals, Al-Talaba met Al-Zawra'a for the third time in a row and won 3–1. In the final, they faced Al-Quwa Al-Jawiya for the second time and defeated them 2–1 at the Al-Shaab Stadium, winning their second successive Umm al-Ma'arik Championship under the management of Saeed. In the 1993–94 Iraq FA Cup, Al-Talaba again faced Al-Zawra'a in the final but lost this time by a score of 1–0. In the 1994–95 Iraqi National League, Al-Talaba finished fourth with 106 points, one point behind Al-Quwa Al-Jawiya in second place and Najaf in third. In the last round, Al-Talaba faced Al-Zawra'a needing a win to finish second, but they lost 2–1. In the fourth edition of the Umm al-Ma'arik Championship, Al-Talaba reached the final against Al-Quwa Al-Jawiya but lost 4–3 on penalties after a 0–0 draw.

In the 1995–96 season, Al-Talaba finished in sixth place with 31 points, having won eight matches, drawn seven and lost seven. They reached the final of the 5th Umm al-Ma'arik Championship, coming up against Al-Quwa Al-Jawiya for the fourth time in a row in this competition, and Al-Talaba won with a single goal scored by Abdul-Wahab Abu Al-Hail, achieving their third Umm al-Ma'arik Championship success. After Al-Zawra'a achieved a double in the 1993–94 season, the Iraq FA chose the FA Cup runners-up, Al-Talaba, as Iraq's representative in the 1995–96 Asian Cup Winners' Cup. Under the management of Ayoub Odisho, they defeated Al-Gharafa in the first leg in Doha 5–3 and lost in the second leg 1–0 at the Al-Shaab Stadium. In the second round, they came up against Yangiyer and lost 2–1 in Tashkent before they turned it around to win 2–0 in Baghdad with goals from Muhannad Mohammed and Qahtan Chathir. In the quarter-finals, Al-Talaba won their first leg against Bahman in Tehran 1–0 with a goal by Sabah Jeayer. At the Al-Shaab Stadium, Bahman won 1–0 for a 1–1 draw on aggregate. The match went to a golden goal decider which was scored by Chathir. Al-Talaba had now qualified for the semi-finals where they were drawn to meet Kazma SC of Kuwait but Kazma withdrew from the tournament, refusing to play against Al-Talaba because of political tensions between Iraq and other Persian Gulf countries, including Saudi Arabia and Kuwait, in the aftermath of the 1991 Gulf War. The AFC directed Al-Talaba to play against Al-Riyadh of Saudi Arabia but they too withdrew for the same reason, and that meant Al-Talaba had a walkover through the semi-finals. In the final, Al-Talaba faced Bellmare Hiratsuka in Kanagawa where they were beaten 2–1 after the winning goal was scored in the 81st minute by Hidetoshi Nakata.

In 1996, the league was renamed to the Iraqi Premier League, and Al-Talaba finished third in the 1996–97 Iraqi Premier League, winning 17 matches, drawing nine and losing four. In August 1996, they participated in the Al-Nasr Al-Adheem Cup, but they did not win the tournament, losing 3–1 to eventual winners Al-Shorta. They reached the round of 16 in the 1996–97 Iraq FA Cup and didn't get past the group stage in the 6th Umm al-Ma'arik Championship. In the 1997–98 season, Al-Talaba finished in fifth place with 61 points, one point behind fourth placed Najaf FC. In the 7th Umm al-Ma'arik Championship, they reached the semi-finals but were defeated by Najaf 3–1 on penalties. In the third place match against Al-Zawra'a, Al-Talaba were beaten 7–0 which is the most goals ever conceded in a match by Al-Talaba.

In the 1998–99 season, now under the management of Akram Salman, Al-Talaba finished in second place, only one point behind the league leaders, Al-Zawra'a, with 75 points. Had Al-Talaba won their final match of the league against Al-Naft, they would have won the league, but they only managed a goalless draw. In the 1998–99 Iraq FA Cup, they reached the final after beating Al-Shorta in the semi-finals. They were defeated by Al-Zawra'a in the final 1–0. Because of Al-Zawra'a achieving the double, the 1999 Perseverance Cup was played between Al-Zawra'a and the league and cup runners-up, Al-Talaba, where they were defeated for the third time that season by Al-Zawra'a, who won 5–4 on penalties after a 2–2 draw. In the 8th Umm al-Ma'arik Championship, Al-Talaba reached the semi-finals where they were beaten by Al-Naft. In the third-place match, Al-Talaba defeated Al-Mina'a 3–1. In the 1998–99 Asian Cup Winners' Cup, they managed to reach the semi-finals where they lost to Al-Ittihad and they then lost the third-place play-off to Kashima Antlers. Al-Talaba finished fourth in the 1999–2000 season with 100 points. They also finished in the same position in the 2000–01 season with 60 points. They finished in fourth place in the 9th Umm al-Ma'arik Championship after a 3–0 loss against Al-Karkh in the third-place play-off. They qualified for the 2000–01 Asian Cup Winners' Cup but were knocked out in the first round by Al-Sadd on away goals. In addition, they lost the 2000 Baghdad Day Cup to Al-Shorta with a 2–1 defeat, and also reached the final of the 2000 Al-Quds International Championship but lost to Al-Zawra'a by 4–3 on penalties after a 1–1 draw.

=== Thair Ahmed era (2001–2007) ===
Al-Talaba participated in the 2001 Al-Wehdat Arabian Championship before the start of the 2001–02 season; they played four games, winning one, drawing two and losing one, finishing third in the tournament. After nine years without winning the league and six years without any trophy, Thair Ahmed led Al-Talaba to the 2001–02 championship with 91 points from 29 wins, four draws and five losses. They started the season by defeating Kirkuk FC 8–0 at Al Karkh Stadium, which is one of the biggest wins by Al-Talaba, and ended it with a 6–0 win over Duhok at Al-Shaab Stadium. They reached the final of the 11th Umm al-Ma'arik Championship, after defeating Al-Karkh 1–0 in the semi-finals, against Al-Shorta where they lost with a single goal after extra time. Younis Mahmoud was the top goalscorer of the tournament. Al-Talaba also won their first-ever Iraq FA Cup that season, after meeting Al-Shorta again in the final and defeating them with Qusay Hashim's late 85th-minute goal. Al-Talaba also won the 2001 Baghdad Day Cup by defeating Al-Zawra'a 2–1 and won the 2002 Perseverance Cup against the league runners-up, Al-Quwa Al-Jawiya, 2–1 after extra time.

Al-Talaba were contending for the 2002–03 title before the league was cancelled due to war. In the 12th Umm al-Ma'arik Championship, they reached the final but were defeated 1–0 by Al-Shorta again. Al-Talaba's Ahmad Salah was named the best player of the tournament. They retained the Iraq FA Cup by defeating Al-Mina'a 1–0 with Alaa Kadhim's goal in the closing minutes and then defeating Al-Shorta in the final 1–0 at the Franso Hariri Stadium with Ahmad Salah's goal in the 26th minute.

In the wake of the 2003 invasion of Iraq, all of Al-Talaba's matches in the 2003–04 season were postponed and then cancelled, except two games which they won against Al-Sinaa before the league was abandoned for the season. Al-Talaba were the runners-up of the 1st Baghdad Championship (the new name of the Umm al-Ma'arik Championship), defeating Al-Shorta 2–1 in the semi-finals and losing to Al-Zawra'a 5–4 on penalties after a 2–2 draw in the final, a match that saw three red cards in total. In the 2002–03 AFC Champions League, Al-Talaba finished third in Group D with three points from three games after one win and two losses.

Al-Talaba participated in the 2003–04 Arab Champions League, reaching the proper group stage where they finished in third place with three points. Before the start of the 2004–05 season, Al-Talaba participated in the 2004 Damascus International Championship. They played three games in the tournament, winning two and losing one, being knocked out in the group stage. They also participated in the 2004 Tishreen Cup, one week after they were knocked out of the Damascus International Championship. In the Tishreen Cup, they finished top of their group to qualify for the semi-finals. They defeated Tishreen SC 1–0 to reach the final, which they lost by 3–2 to fellow Iraqi club Al-Zawra'a. In the 2004–05 Iraqi Premier League, Al-Talaba finished the first phase as leaders of Group Three with 28 points, having won eight matches, drawn four and lost four. They also became leaders of Group Two in the second phase with eight points, ahead of Al-Naft who had seven points, after winning two matches and drawing two. In the semi-finals, Al-Talaba came up against Al-Quwa Al-Jawiya; they were beaten in the first leg 1–0 and drew the second leg 2–2. Al-Talaba won the third-place play-off against Al-Zawra'a 4–1 on penalties after a 1–1 draw.

Al-Talaba maintained their performance in the 2005–06 Iraqi Premier League by finishing the first phase as the leaders of Group Four with 24 points from seven wins, three draws and two losses. In the second phase, they finished in second place with seven points behind Al-Quwa Al-Jawiya, who had the same number of points but a better goal difference of +4 against Al-Talaba's +1. In the last match of the second phase, Al-Talaba faced Al-Quwa Al-Jawiya with a chance to retain the league leadership, but they lost 3–1. From 2–9 September 2005, Al-Talaba participated in the 2005 Damascus International Championship, reaching the final against fellow Iraqi club Al-Zawra'a. Al-Talaba won 5–4 on penalties. In the 2005–06 Arab Champions League, Al-Talaba won their first round tie against Al-Shabab by 3–1 in the first leg and 4–1 in the second leg. They faced Al-Qadisiyah in the second round and were defeated 1–0 in the first leg and 2–1 in the second leg to be eliminated the competition.

On 30 November 2006, the club's president, Hadeeb Majhoul, was kidnapped by an unknown terrorist group in Baghdad and, after three days, his body was found in the morgue. The administrative board elected the team's striker at the time, Alaa Kadhim, as the new interim president until the club's elections in which he won with 93 votes out of 97 existing on 15 March 2007. Alaa Khadim was the club's player-president through 2006–07. Aged 35 at the end of the season, he retired from playing in order to focus on administering the club.

Before the start of the 2006–07 season, Al-Talaba participated in the 2006 Shabab Al-Ordon Arab Championship, a tournament organised by Shabab Al-Ordon Club. Al-Talaba played three matches in the tournament and drew all three of them, being knocked out in the group stage. In the 2006–07 Iraqi Premier League, Al-Talaba finished the first phase in second place with 13 points, behind Al-Zawra'a with 14 points, with three wins, four draws, and one loss. Al-Talaba managed to finish second in the elite stage with eight points from two wins, two draws and one loss, just ahead of Karbalaa with seven points. In the semi-finals, Al-Talaba lost to Al-Quwa Al-Jawiya 2–0 and then lost 2–1 to Najaf FC in the third-place play-off.

=== Instability and crisis (2007–2013) ===
Before the start of the 2007–08 season, Al-Talaba participated in the 2007 Press Club Championship, hosted in Syria. Al-Talaba drew both of their group stage matches, finishing second in their group to qualify for the semi-finals. In the semi-final, they lost 3–1 against Nawair SC and were knocked out. Al-Talaba considered withdrawing from the 2007–08 Iraqi Premier League due to a financial crisis that led to their players not being paid all their salaries on time, but eventually decided not to withdraw. Under the management of Karim Saddam, Nabil Zaki and Karim Salman, Al-Talaba finished in fifth place in the first phase of the league with 36 points, having won nine matches, drew nine, and lost four. They played poorly in the second phase, ending the phase in third place in their group with seven points with only one win, four draws, and three losses. They were knocked out in the round of 32 in the 2007–08 Arab Champions League, losing 4–0 on aggregate to USM Alger. In the 2008–09 Iraqi Premier League, with Abdul Ghani Shahad as Al-Talaba's manager, they finished in third place in their group with 47 points, only three points behind Najaf FC, with 14 wins, five draws, and five losses.

In the 2009–10 Iraqi Premier League, under the management of Radhi Shenaishil, Al-Talaba finished as the leaders of Group B in the first stage with 68 points, having won 19 matches, drew 11, and lost four. They withdrew in the twelfth round due to a ruling from the Iraqi Olympic Committee where they were set to face Baghdad that awarded the win. In the elite stage, Al-Talaba ended up in second place of Group One as the best runners-up of the three groups where they had ten points, the same number of points as the first place, Al-Zawra'a, but they had the goals difference of +2 and Al-Talaba the goals difference of +1. If either Al-Quwa Al-Jawiya had beaten Naft Al-Janoob or Al-Shorta had beaten Najaf FC, Al-Talaba would not have qualified for the semi-finals, but Jawiya drew 0–0 and Al-Shorta drew 2–2. In the semi-finals, Al-Talaba won 1–0 to Erbil in the first leg and drew with no goals in the second leg. They lost in the final to Duhok SC with a late goal in the 82nd minute.

With Yahya Alwan as their manager, Al-Talaba had one of the worst seasons in their history in the 2010–11 Iraqi Elite League, finishing the season in eighth place of the Southern group with 38 points, only one point away from relegation, with nine wins, eleven draws, and six losses. In the 2011 AFC Cup, Al-Talaba finished in third place in their group with five points, having won one match, drew two, and lost three, therefore they were knocked out at the group stage. In the 2011–12 Iraqi Elite League, Al-Talaba with Jamal Ali, Khalaf Hassan, and Karim Salman as their consecutive managers, finished the season in fourth place with 68 points, winning in 19 matches, drawing in 11, and losing in eight.

In the 2012–13 Iraqi Elite League, under the management of Nazar Ashraf, Al-Talaba returned to their poor performance of the 2010–11 season, finishing in the 14th place with 35 points, only one point away from relegation, with only nine wins, eight draws, and 17 losses. They saved the club from being relegated in the 33rd round against Al-Naft where they won 2–1 and also because of Al-Kahraba's loss to Zakho in the last round. Al-Talaba passed the round of 32 of the 2012–13 Iraq FA Cup where they were up against Al-Zawra'a, drawing 0–0 in the first leg and winning 3–1 in the second leg before the tournament was abandoned.

=== Recent history (2013–) ===
Al-Talaba finished the 2013–14 Iraqi Premier League, under the management of Abdul-Wahab Abu Al-Hail, in eighth place with 31 points from 22 matches. The season after, Al-Talaba finished in fifth place of Group Two with four wins, five draws, and seven losses before Abu Al-Hail was sacked. In that season, they also participated in a friendly cup, the Tournament for the Armed Forces, which was played between the big four clubs of Baghdad. The mini-tournament started at the semi-final stage and each match was only 30 minutes long. Al-Talaba were knocked out in the semi-final by Al-Zawra'a, 4–2 on penalties after a 0–0 draw.

In June 2015, the board signed Ayoub Odisho as the team's new manager again after almost two decades. The team also signed Younis Mahmoud, the captain of the Iraq national team, twelve years after he left the club in 2003, with a free contract to get ready for the 2015–16 season. The team finished the group stage in fourth place of Group One with 27 points with seven wins, six draws and four losses, getting qualified to the final stage, where they finished in third place with three wins, three draws and a loss. The following season saw Al-Talaba finish in seventh place in the league with 54 points from 36 games. In the 2016–17 Iraq FA Cup, Al-Talaba defeated Al-Kadhimiya and Al-Najda to reach the quarter-final, but they had to withdraw from the quarter-final game against Naft Al-Wasat after their players went on strike in protest at their unpaid wages.

== Stadiums ==
On 8 December 2003, a stadium to hold 8,000 spectators was opened at Hai Al-Qahira in Baghdad to host Al-Talaba's home matches. Al-Talaba currently hold their training sessions at the University of Baghdad Stadium in Jadraya, Baghdad, 15 km away from their main stadium.

In early 2014, the owner of the club, the Ministry of Higher Education and Scientific Research, gave the project of building a new sports city to the Spanish company TriArena. They are constructing a main football stadium with a capacity of 16,000 spectators and an area of 71,150 m^{2}. The project also includes two tennis courts, a basketball court, a volleyball court, a futsal pitch, a handball court, a hotel, restaurants, and a covered swimming pool. Al-Talaba is defined as a sports club, not just a football one, and it has supported other sports at minor level only in the past. The foundation stone was laid by the former minister of higher education and scientific research, Ali al-Adeeb, in February 2014. The cost of the project is estimated to be $84 million and the duration of construction was expected to be 30 months, meaning that by 2017 the Al-Talaba Sports City should have been open. Due to the financial crisis in Iraq, the project was scratched after spending $4 million on designs.

== Rivalries ==
Al-Talaba is one of the four "Popular Teams" in Baghdad, the others being Al-Zawra'a, Al-Quwa Al-Jawiya and Al-Shorta. All the four Popular Teams have rivalries with each other. Al-Talaba's arch rivals are Al-Zawra'a and Al-Quwa Al-Jawiya because of their constant battles to win the Iraqi Premier League over the years.

== Statistics ==
=== Recent seasons ===
The season-by-season performance of the club over the recent years:

Season	League	Rank	P	W	D	L	F	A	GD	Pts	Cup
2000–01	Iraqi Elite League	4	30	17	9	4	43	22	21	60	—
2001–02	Iraqi Elite League	1	38	29	4	5	89	18	71	91	Won
2002–03^{(1)}	Iraqi First Division League	—	24	19	2	3	56	15	41	59	Won
2003–04^{(1)}	Iraqi Premier League	—	2	2	0		5	1	4	6	—
2004–05	Iraqi Premier League	Third place	23	11	7	5	32	17	15	40	—
2005–06	Iraqi Premier League	2 – Group 4	16	9	4	3	29	11	18	31	—
2006–07	Iraqi Premier League	Fourth place	15	5	6	4	11	11	0	21	—
2007–08	Iraqi Premier League	3 – Group 2	30	10	13	7	29	24	5	43	—
2008–09	Iraqi Premier League	3 – Group 2	24	14	5	5	32	15	17	47	—
2009–10	Iraqi Premier League	Runners-up	43	23	13	7	53	25	28	82	—
2010–11	Iraqi Elite League	8 – Group B	26	9	11	6	33	25	8	38	—
2011–12	Iraqi Elite League	4	38	19	11	8	45	29	16	68	—
2012–13	Iraqi Elite League	14	34	9	8	17	35	47	−12	35	R16^{(2)}
2013–14	Iraqi Premier League	8	22	9	4	9	28	30	−2	31	—
2014–15	Iraqi Premier League	5 – Group 2	16	4	5	7	18	18	0	17	—
2015–16	Iraqi Premier League	3	24	10	9	5	28	20	8	39	—
2016–17	Iraqi Premier League	7	36	14	12	10	51	38	13	54	QF
2017–18	Iraqi Premier League	14	38	11	10	17	43	59	–16	43	—
2018–19	Iraqi Premier League	13	38	10	14	14	47	52	–5	44	SF
2019–20^{(1)}	Iraqi Premier League	—	6	2	2	2	11	10	—		R32^{(2)}
2020–21	Iraqi Premier League	17	38	8	15	15	36	47	–11	39	R32
2021–22	Iraqi Premier League	3	38	20	9	9	54	33	21	69	R32
2022–23	Iraqi Premier League	4	38	19	9	10	52	39	13	66	QF
2023–24	Iraq Stars League	8	38	13	14	11	40	38	2	53	R16
2024–25	Iraq Stars League	4	38	18	9	11	40	27	13	63	QF
2025–26	Iraq Stars League	6	38	18	11	9	53	38	15	65	R16^{(2)}

As of 2 June 2026. Rank = Rank in the league; P = Played; W = Win; D = Draw; L = Loss; F = Goals for; A = Goals against; GD = Goal difference; Pts = Points; Cup = Iraq FA Cup.
in = Still in competition; — = Not attended; 1R = 1st round; 2R = 2nd round; 3R = 3rd round; R16 = Round of sixteen; QF = Quarterfinals; SF = Semifinals.

^{1} The league was not completed and was cancelled.
^{2} Al-Talaba had not yet been eliminated from the cup but it was abandoned midway through.

=== In international competitions ===
As of 10 May 2011:

Competition	Record				
Competition	G	W	D	L	Win %
AFC Champions League	9	4	1	4	44.44
Asian Cup Winners' Cup	18	8	5	5	44.44
AFC Cup	6	1	2	3	16.67
Arab Champions League	18	7	4	7	38.89
Total	51	20	12	19	39.22

== Current squad ==
=== First-team squad ===
As of 19 August 2026

Note: Flags indicate national team as defined under FIFA eligibility rules; some limited exceptions apply. Players may hold more than one non-FIFA nationality.

No.	Pos.	Nation	Player
1	GK	IRQ	Sajjad Mohammed
3	DF	IRI	Siavash Yazdani
4	DF	IRQ	Saad Natiq (captain)
5	DF	CMR	Ngweni Ndassi ^{FGN}
6	MF	IRQ	Zaid Ismail
7	MF	IRQ	Shareef Abdul-Kadhim
9	FW	ALG	Karim Aribi
10	MF	IRQ	Louai Al-Ani
11	DF	IRQ	Karrar Saad
12	GK	IRI	Yasin Hassanzadeh
14	MF	IRQ	Karrar Mohammed
15	DF	IRQ	Hussein Ammar
17	MF	TUN	Habib Oueslati ^{FGN}
19	MF	IRQ	Mahdi Kamel

No.	Pos.	Nation	Player
20	MF	IRI	Jafar Salmani
21	MF	CRO	Andrija Filipović
22	GK	IRQ	Yassin Karim
27	FW	TAN	Simon Msuva ^{FGN}
30	MF	IRQ	Ahmed Suhail
32	DF	IRQ	Hassan Ashour
35	MF	IRQ	Ali Mahdi
44	DF	YEM	Hamza Al-Rimi ^{ARB}
55	DF	TUN	Ghaith Maaroufi ^{FGN}
70	MF	ECU	Darío Pazmiño ^{FGN}
95	FW	IRQ	Hussein Abdullah
98	GK	IRQ	Fahad Talib

=== Captains ===
Years	Position	Captain
−1976	Midfielder	(Iraq) Abdul-Wahab Abdul-Qadir
1976–1977	Defender	(Iraq) Jalal Salih
1977–1981	Goalkeeper	(Iraq) Muthanna Hameed
1981–1987	Midfielder	(Iraq) Jamal Ali
1987–1990	Forward	(Iraq) Hussein Saeed
1990–1995	Midfielder	(Iraq) Ali Hussein Shihab
1995–1997	Defender	(Iraq) Karim Salman
1997–2000	Forward	(Iraq) Alaa Kadhim
2000–2003	Midfielder	(Iraq) Habib Jafar
2003–2007	Forward	(Iraq) Alaa Kadhim
2007–2008	Defender	(Iraq) Ahmed Abdul-Majeed
2008–2009	Defender	(Iraq) Bassim Abbas
2009–2010	Midfielder	(Iraq) Gaith Abdul-Ghani
2010–2011	Midfielder	(Iraq) Abdul-Wahab Abu Al-Hail
2011–2012	Defender	(Iraq) Majeed Hameed
2012–2014	Goalkeeper	(Iraq) Ali Mutashar
2014–2015	Midfielder	(Iraq) Osama Ali
2015	Midfielder	(Iraq) Salih Sadir
2015–2016	Forward	(Iraq) Younis Mahmoud
2016–2017	Defender	(Iraq) Mahdi Kareem
2017	Forward	(Iraq) Yassir Abdul-Mohsen
2017–2018	Goalkeeper	(Iraq) Noor Sabri
2018	Goalkeeper	(Iraq) Ali Abdul-Hasan
2018–	Defender	(Iraq) Salam Shaker

== Personnel ==
=== Current technical staff ===
Position	Staff
Head coach	Alireza Mansourian
Assistant coach	Haidar Mohammad
Assistant coach	Ahmed Basim Qasim
Goalkeeping coach	Hisham Khamis
Fitness coach	Nusair Abdul-Amir

==== Managerial history ====
Dates	Name	
1969–1974	(Iraq) Thamir Muhsin	
1974–1978	(Iraq) Jamal Salih	
1978–1979	(Iraq) Abdul-Wahab Abdul-Qadir	
1979–1980	(Iraq) Khalaf Hassan	
1980–1981	(Iraq) Ammo Baba	
1981–1982	(Iraq) Jamal Salih	
1982–1984	(Iraq) Akram Salman	
1984–1986	(Iraq) Yahya Alwan	
1986	(Iraq) Ahmed Subhi	
1986	(Iraq) Yahya Alwan	
1986–1987	(Iraq) Jamal Salih	
1987–1988	(Iraq) Yousif Abdul-Ameer	
1988–1990	(Iraq) Jamal Ali	
1990	(Italy) Eddie Firmani	
1990–1992	(Iraq) Yahya Alwan	
1992–1993	(Iraq) Ayoub Odisho	
1993	(Iraq) Hussein Saeed	
1993–1995	(Iraq) Ayoub Odisho	
1995	(Iraq) Nazar Ashraf	
1995–1996	(Iraq) Jamal Ali	
1996	(Iraq) Ayoub Odisho	
1996–1997	(Iraq) Nazar Ashraf	
1997–1998	(Iraq) Nazar Ashraf	(Iraq) Ammo Baba
1998–1999	(Iraq) Ammo Baba	(Iraq) Akram Salman
1999	(Iraq) Abdelilah Mohammed	
1999	(Iraq) Ammo Baba	

Dates	Name	Ref
1999–2000	(Iraq) Amer Jameel	
2000	(Iraq) Nazar Ashraf	
2000	(Iraq) Mohammed Tabra	
2000–2001	(Iraq) Anwar Jassim	
2001	(Iraq) Nazar Ashraf	
2001–2007	(Iraq) Thair Ahmed	
2007	(Iraq) Habib Jafar	
2007–2008	(Iraq) Karim Saddam	
2008	(Iraq) Nabil Zaki	
2008	(Iraq) Karim Salman	
2008–2009	(Iraq) Abdul Ghani Shahad	
2009–2010	(Iraq) Radhi Shenaishil	
2010–2011	(Iraq) Yahya Alwan	
2011	(Iraq) Thair Ahmed	
2011–2012	(Iraq) Jamal Ali	
2012	(Iraq) Khalaf Hassan	
2012	(Iraq) Karim Salman	
2012–2013	(Iraq) Nazar Ashraf	
2013	(Iraq) Nabil Zaki	
2013–2015	(Iraq) Abdul-Wahab Abu Al-Hail	
2015	(Iraq) Salih Radhi	
2015–2017	(Iraq) Ayoub Odisho	

Dates	Name	Ref
2017	(Iraq) Mudhafar Jabbar	
2017	(Iraq) Habib Jafar	
2017–2018	(Romania) Tita Valeriu	
2018	(Iraq) Essam Hamad	
2018–2019	(Iraq) Yahya Alwan	
2019	(Iraq) Thair Ahmed	
2019	(Iraq) Fawzi Abdul-Sada/Mahdi Kadhim	
2019	(Iraq) Ali Hadi	
2019	(Iraq) Thair Jassam	
2019–2021	(Iraq) Ahmed Khalef	
2021	(Iraq) Fareed Majeed, Ibrahim Abd Nader	
2021	(Iraq) Hasan Ahmad	
2021	(Iraq) Thair Jassam	
2021–2022	(Iraq) Qahtan Chathir	

=== Current board ===
Office	Name
President	Alaa Kadhim
Vice-president	Mohammed Al-Hashimi
Secretary	Khalid Hadi
Members of the administrative board	Mahdi Kadhim
Members of the administrative board	Abdul Ghafour Abd al-Hafith
Members of the administrative board	Khuloud Abdul Wahab
Members of the administrative board	Abdul Jaleel Salih

==== Recent presidents ====
Years	Name	Elections	Notes
1990s–2000s	Omar Sabaawi		
–2004	Abdul-Salam Al-Guood		
2004–2006	Hadeeb Majhoul	2004	(Note: He was kidnapped and assassinated.)
2006–2008	Alaa Kadhim	–	(Note: Acting president until the elections.)
2008–	Alaa Kadhim	2008, 2012, 2018	

== Honours ==
=== National ===
Competition	Titles	Seasons
Iraq Stars League	5	1980–81, 1981–82, 1985–86, 1992–93, 2001–02
Iraq FA Cup	2	2001–02, 2002–03
Iraqi Super Cup	1	2002
Baghdad Championship	3^{s}	1992–93, 1993–94, 1995–96

- record
- ^{S} shared record

=== Regional ===
Competition	Titles	Seasons
Iraq Central FA Second Division	1	1970–71

=== Friendly ===
Competition	Titles	Seasons
Baghdad Day Cup	2	2001, 2002
Damascus International Championship	1	2005
Stafford Challenge Cup	1	1984

== See also ==
- List of football clubs in Iraq
