= 1999 Iraqi Perseverance Cup =

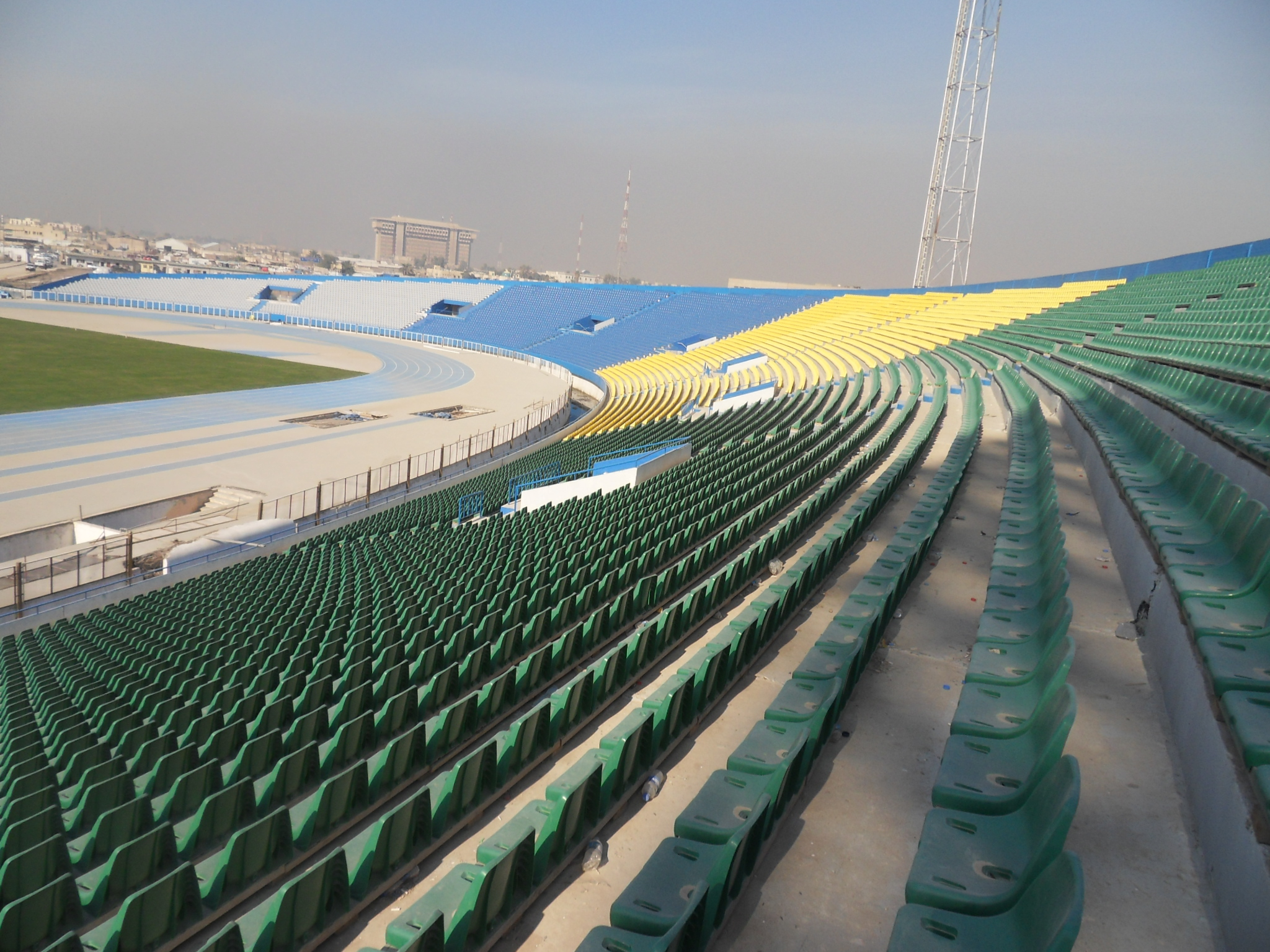
- The match took place at Al-Shaab Stadium
Al-Zawraa	Al-Talaba
2	2
- After golden goal extra time Al-Zawraa won 5–4 on penalties
- Date: 15 September 1999
- Venue: Al-Shaab Stadium, Baghdad
- Referee: Hazim Hussein

The 1999 Iraqi Perseverance Cup (Arabic: كأس المثابرة العراقي 1999) was the 4th edition of the Iraqi Super Cup. The match was contested between Baghdad rivals Al-Zawraa and Al-Talaba at Al-Shaab Stadium in Baghdad. It was played on 15 September 1999 as a curtain-raiser to the 1999–2000 season. Al-Zawraa retained their title, winning 5–4 on penalties after a 2–2 draw.

== Match ==
=== Details ===
15 September 1999

Al-Zawraa	2–2 (a.e.t.)	Al-Talaba
Abdul-Latif; Rahim		Kadhim
Penalties
	5–4

Al-Shaab Stadium, Baghdad
Referee: Hazim Hussein

Iraqi Super Cup
1999 winner
Al-Zawraa
2nd title
