= 2000 Iraqi Perseverance Cup =

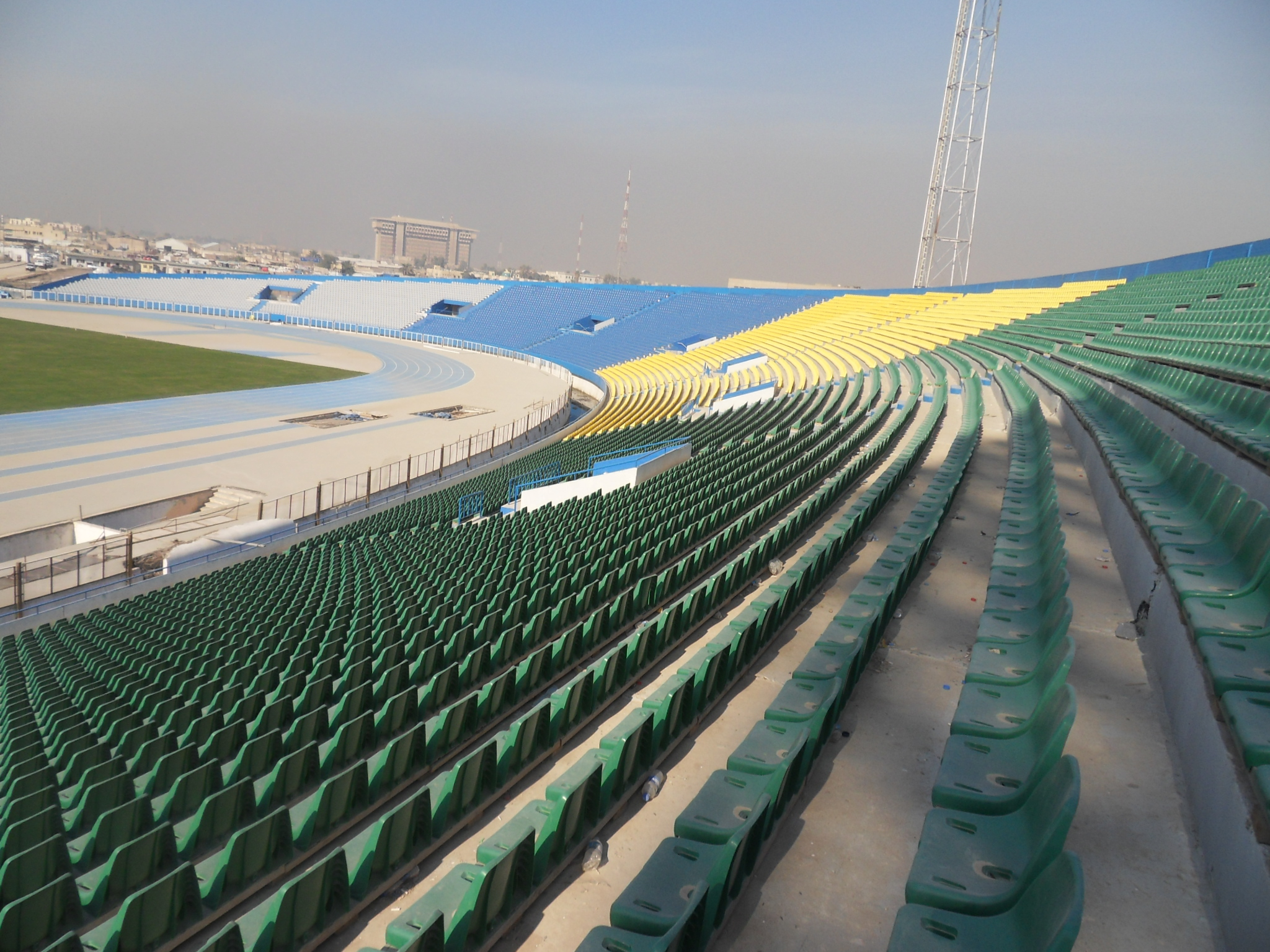
- The match took place at Al-Shaab Stadium
Al-Zawraa	Al-Quwa Al-Jawiya
1	0
- Date: 22 December 2000
- Venue: Al-Shaab Stadium, Baghdad
- Referee: Mahmoud Nouraddin

The 2000 Iraqi Perseverance Cup (Arabic: كأس المثابرة العراقي 2000) was the 5th edition of the Iraqi Super Cup. The match was contested between Baghdad rivals Al-Zawraa and Al-Quwa Al-Jawiya at Al-Shaab Stadium in Baghdad. It was played on 22 December 2000 as a curtain-raiser to the 2000–01 season. Al-Zawraa retained their title, winning the match 1–0.

== Match ==
=== Details ===
22 December 2000

Al-Zawraa	1–0	Al-Quwa Al-Jawiya
Hamad 68'

Al-Shaab Stadium, Baghdad
Referee: Mahmoud Nouraddin

Iraqi Super Cup
2000 winner
Al-Zawraa
3rd title
