= Jadraya =

Coordinates: 35°44′N 36°26′E

Jadraya جدرايا
- Village
- Location in Syria
- Country: Syria
- Governorate: Idlib
- District: Ariha District
- Subdistrict: Muhambal Nahiyah

Population (2004)
  - Total: 1,820
- Time zone: UTC+2 (EET)
  - Summer (DST): UTC+3 (EEST)
- City Qrya Pcode: C4320

Jadraya (Arabic: جدرايا) is a Syrian village located in Muhambal Nahiyah in Ariha District, Idlib. According to the Syria Central Bureau of Statistics (CBS), Jadraya had a population of 1820 in the 2004 census.

== Incidents ==
As of 2018, the town was controlled by rebels. In September 2018, it was bombed by Russian and Syrian forces, and also in 2020, where 2 children were killed.
