= 2002 Iraqi Perseverance Cup =

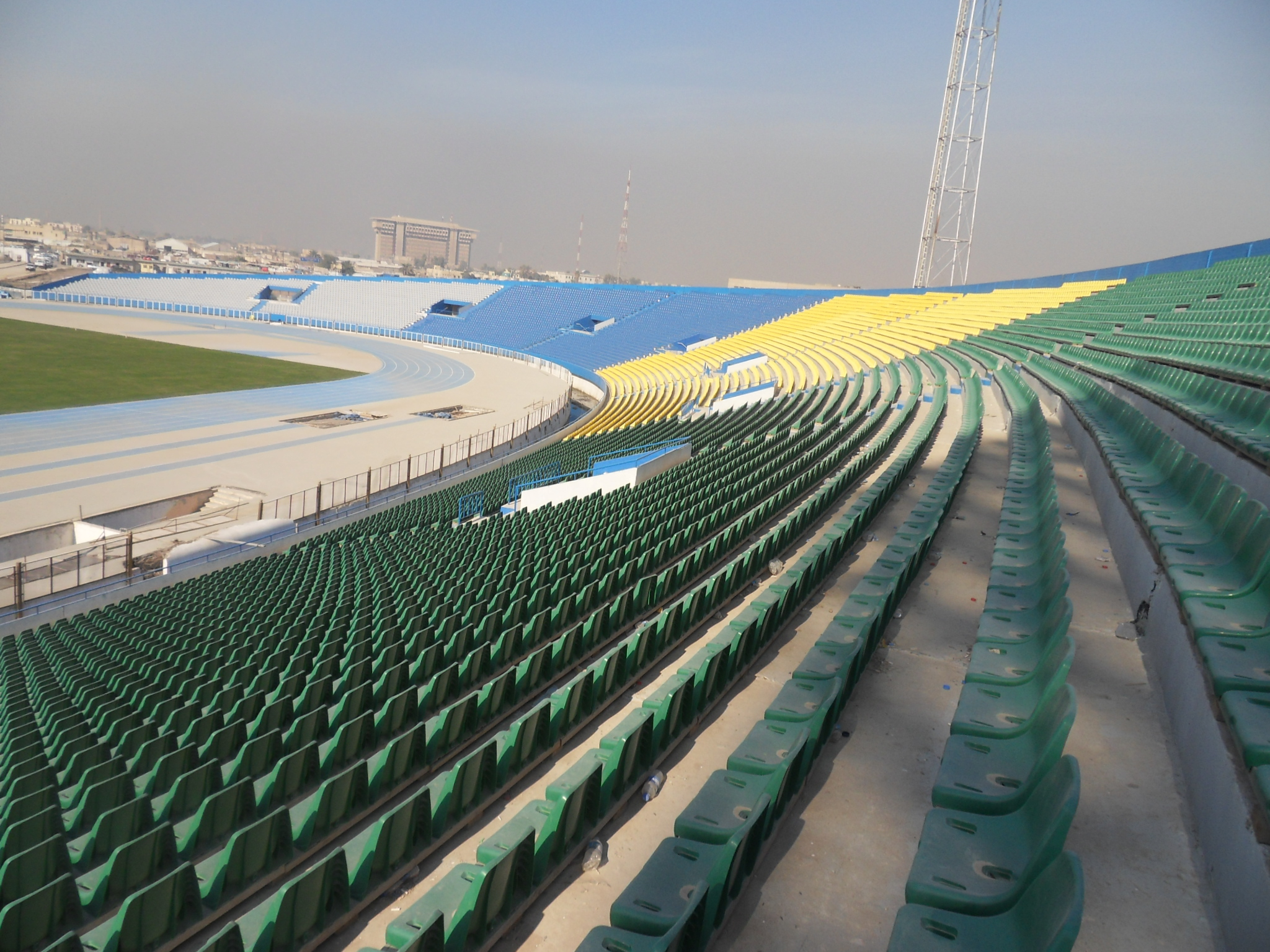
- The match took place at Al-Shaab Stadium
Al-Talaba	Al-Quwa Al-Jawiya
2	1
- After golden goal extra time
- Date: 30 August 2002
- Venue: Al-Shaab Stadium, Baghdad
- Referee: Hazim Hussein

The 2002 Iraqi Perseverance Cup (Arabic: كأس المثابرة العراقي 2002) was the 7th edition of the Iraqi Super Cup. The match was contested between Baghdad rivals Al-Talaba and Al-Quwa Al-Jawiya at Al-Shaab Stadium in Baghdad. It was played on 30 August 2002 as a curtain-raiser to the 2002–03 season. Al-Talaba won their first Super Cup title, winning the match 2–1 after golden goal extra time. Both of Al-Talaba's goals were free-kicks scored by Fawzi Abdul-Sada.

== Match ==
=== Details ===
30 August 2002

Al-Talaba	2–1 (a.e.t.)	Al-Quwa Al-Jawiya
Abdul-Sada 90' 96'		Dhahid 34'

Al-Shaab Stadium, Baghdad
Referee: Hazim Hussein

Iraqi Super Cup
2002 winner
Al-Talaba
1st title
