= Iraqi Super Cup =

- Organiser(s): Iraq Football Association
- Founded: 1986; 40 years ago
- Region: Iraq
- Teams: 2 (until 2022); 4 (2026–present)
- Current champions: Al-Shorta (2nd title)
- Most championships: Al-Zawraa (5 titles)
- Broadcaster: Al-Iraqiya Sports
- 2026 Iraqi Super Cup

The Iraqi Super Cup (Arabic: كأس السوبر العراقي), previously called Iraqi Perseverance Cup (Arabic: كأس المثابرة العراقي), is a super cup tournament in Iraqi football. Founded in 1986 as a two-team competition, the current version has been contested since 2026 by four teams: the winners and runners-up of the Iraq Stars League and the Iraq FA Cup.

Al-Zawraa are the most successful club with five titles. The current holders are Al-Shorta, who defeated Al-Karkh 1–0 in the 2022 final.

== History ==
Before 1973, league tournaments in Iraq were played at a regional level and there was a cup called the Iraq Central FA Perseverance Cup played between the winners and runners-up of the Iraq Central FA Premier League. Twelve years after the foundation of the Iraqi National Clubs League, the Perseverance Cup was played as a national tournament for the first time, and it was between Al-Talaba and Al-Rasheed, the winners and runners-up of the 1985–86 Iraqi National League.

It took another eleven years for the tournament to resume, returning in 1997 as a match between the winners of the Iraqi Premier League and the Iraq FA Cup. The 1997 and 1998 editions were played at the end of the season to bring a close to the campaign, but from 1999 onwards, the cup was played before the start of the following league season as a 'curtain-raiser' to the new league campaign.

From the 2003–04 season until the 2014–15 season, the Iraq FA Cup was either not played or not completed. It was finally completed in 2015–16, and therefore the Iraqi Perseverance Cup under the new name of Iraqi Super Cup was scheduled to be played in August 2016, but it was cancelled due to scheduling difficulties. The Iraqi Super Cup eventually returned in 2017 and was held four times until it was stopped after the 2022 edition.

On 24 May 2025, it was announced that the tournament would return for the following season with a new six-team format featuring the top four teams from the Stars League and the top two teams from the FA Cup. The six teams would be split into two groups of three, with each team facing the other teams in their group once. The group winners would qualify for the final, while the group runners-up would compete in a third place play-off. The competition was set to be held from 19–29 August 2025, however it was eventually cancelled after several teams announced their intention to withdraw from the tournament due to insufficient preparation time.

== Rules ==
Since 2026, the Super Cup has been a four-team tournament, with the Stars League champions playing the FA Cup runners-up in one semi-final, and the FA Cup winners playing the Stars League runners-up in the other semi-final. The winners of each semi-final match advance to the final to compete for the trophy. If the scores are level after 90 minutes, the teams play a penalty shootout. A maximum of five substitutions are available per match for each team.

If one of the FA Cup finalists finish in the Stars League's top two positions, the third-placed team in the Stars League enters the Super Cup, while if both FA Cup finalists finish in the Stars League's top two positions, the third and fourth-placed teams in the Stars League enter the Super Cup.

== Finals by year ==
=== Two-team format ===
Year	Winners	Result	Runners-up
Iraqi Perseverance Cup
1986	Al-Rasheed	2–1	Al-Talaba
1987–1996	Not held		
1997	Al-Quwa Al-Jawiya	3–1	Al-Zawraa
1998	Al-Zawraa	1–0	Al-Shorta
1999	Al-Zawraa	2–2 (a.e.t.) (5–4 p)	Al-Talaba
2000	Al-Zawraa	1–0	Al-Quwa Al-Jawiya
2001	Al-Quwa Al-Jawiya	1–0	Al-Zawraa
2002	Al-Talaba	2–1 (g.g.)	Al-Quwa Al-Jawiya
Iraqi Super Cup
2016	Cancelled		
2017	Al-Zawraa	1–1 (3–0 p)	Al-Quwa Al-Jawiya
2018	Not held		
2019	Al-Shorta	1–1 (4–3 p)	Al-Zawraa
2020	Not held		
2021	Al-Zawraa	1–0	Al-Quwa Al-Jawiya
2022	Al-Shorta	1–0	Al-Karkh

=== Four-team format ===
Year	Final			Semi-finalists
Year	Winners	Score	Runners-up	Semi-finalists
2026	TBD			TBD

== Titles by club ==
Team	Winners	Runners-up	Years won	Years runner-up
Al-Zawraa	5	3	1998, 1999, 2000, 2017, 2021	1997, 2001, 2019
Al-Quwa Al-Jawiya	2	4	1997, 2001	2000, 2002, 2017, 2021
Al-Shorta	2	1	2019, 2022	1998
Al-Talaba	1	2	2002	1986, 1999
Al-Rasheed	1	0	1986	—
Al-Karkh	0	1	—	2022

== List of winning managers ==
Year	Nationality	Winning manager	Club
1986	Iraq	Hazem Jassam	Al-Rasheed
1997	Iraq	Ayoub Odisho	Al-Quwa Al-Jawiya
1998	Iraq	Anwar Jassam	Al-Zawraa
1999	Iraq	Adnan Hamad	Al-Zawraa
2000	Iraq	Adnan Hamad	Al-Zawraa
2001	Iraq	Abdelilah Abdul-Hameed	Al-Quwa Al-Jawiya
2002	Iraq	Thair Ahmed	Al-Talaba
2017	Iraq	Ayoub Odisho	Al-Zawraa
2019	Serbia	Aleksandar Ilić	Al-Shorta
2021	Iraq	Essam Hamad	Al-Zawraa
2022	Egypt	Moamen Soliman	Al-Shorta
