= Hashim Khamis =

Iraqi footballer

Hashim Khamis Hassan
Personal information
- Date of birth: 17 July 1969 (age 57)
- Place of birth: Baghdad, Iraq
- Position: Goalkeeper

Senior career*
Years	Team	Apps	(Gls)
1988–1989	Al Shabab	-	(-)
1989–2000	Al-Quwa Al-Jawiya	-	(-)
2000-2003	Salam Zgharta	-	(-)
2003-2005	Akhaa Ahli Aley FC	-	(-)

International career
1999–2002	Iraq	9	(0)

Managerial career
- 2012–2017: Al-Quwa Al-Jawiya (Goalkeeping coach)
- 2017–2018: Iraq (Goalkeeping coach)
- 2018–2019: Al-Quwa Al-Jawiya (Goalkeeping coach)
- 2019: Al-Naft SC (Goalkeeping coach)
- 2019–2020: Amanat Baghdad (Goalkeeping coach)
- 2020–2021: Al-Quwa Al-Jawiya (Goalkeeping coach)
- * Club domestic league appearances and goals

Hashim Khamis Hassan (Arabic: هَاشِم خَمِيس حَسَن; born 17 July 1969) is an Iraqi football goalkeeper who played for the Iraq in the 2000 Asian Cup. He also played for Al-Quwa Al-Jawiya. He is known as Hashim Tayara (aeroplane).

Hashim Khamis arrived onto the international scene in 1993, but only became a regular under Najih Humoud six years later at the 2000 Asian Cup qualifiers.

Iraqi legend Habib Jafar once described him as being around the same level as Mohamad Al-Daeyea; the Saudi Arabian goalkeeper widely recognised as one of the best keepers in Asia.

Hashim was heavily criticised for Iraq’s 4-1 defeat in the 2000 Asian Cup quarterfinals by Japan and was one of the many players including Essam Hamad and Hussam Fawzi that were later dropped by coach Milan Zivadinovic during the naming of Iraq’s 2002 World Cup qualifying squad. He was also flogged for three days under orders from Uday Hussein for losing in the quarterfinals.
