= Al-Zawraa SC =

Association football club in Iraq

Al-Zawraa
- Full name: Al-Zawraa Sports Club
- Nicknames: Al-Nawaris (The Gulls); Al-Zaeem (The Boss)
- Founded: 29 June 1969; 57 years ago as Al-Muwasalat
- Ground: Al-Zawraa Stadium
- Capacity: 15,443
- President: Haider Shanshool
- Head coach: Alireza Mansourian
- League: Iraq Stars League
- 2025–26: Iraq Stars League, 4th of 20
- Website: alzawraaclub.com
Home colours	Away colours	Third colours

Al-Zawraa Sports Club (Arabic: نادي الزوراء الرياضي) is an Iraqi professional sports club based in Utafiya, Karkh, Baghdad. Al-Zawraa's football team competes in the Iraq Stars League, the top flight of Iraqi football. Founded in 1969 under the name Al-Muwasalat (lit. 'Transportation'), the club changed its name to Al-Zawraa in 1972. The team plays its home games at Al-Zawraa Stadium, which was built in 1978 and opened in 2022 and replaced the club's old ground at the same site.

Al-Zawraa is the most successful team in Iraqi domestic football, having won 14 Iraq Stars League titles, 16 Iraq FA Cups and 5 Iraqi Super Cups—all record totals. Al-Zawraa also won the Baghdad Championship a joint-record three times, including its inaugural edition and its final edition. Al-Zawraa has won the domestic double a record eight times and became only the second Iraqi team to win the domestic quadruple in the 1999–2000 season.

In international football, Al-Zawraa finished fourth at the 1996–97 Asian Club Championship and were runners-up of the 1999–2000 Asian Cup Winners' Cup. The team's home colour is white, thus they are nicknamed "Al-Nawaris" (lit. 'The Gulls'). The club shares a fierce rivalry with Al-Quwa Al-Jawiya, and also contests Baghdad derbies with Al-Shorta and Al-Talaba.

== History ==
=== Foundation and rise to prominence (1969–1979) ===
Al-Zawraa was founded on 29 June 1969 as Al-Muwasalat, which means 'Transportation'. Al-Muwasalat participated in the Iraq Central FA Fourth Division in the 1969–70 season. In the 1970–71 season, they won the fourth division and were promoted to the third division. The 1971–72 season saw the establishment of 'Al-Muwasalat B' (the club's B team), with the merger of Al-Bareed B and Al-Matar Al-Madani, which joined the fourth division. In their first season, Al-Muwasalat B won the fourth division under coach Rasheed Radhi and were promoted to the third division, beating Al-Shabab 2–1 on 1 June 1972 at Al-Kashafa Stadium.

On 16 November 1972, the club was renamed to Al-Zawraa. The 1972–73 season saw both Al-Zawraa and Al-Zawraa B competing in the third division, and in the 1973–74 season, Al-Zawraa B won the third division title after a 2–1 win over Indhibat Al-Shorta, securing promotion to the second division. As they were the club's B team, the A and B teams merged back together, and the club was also merged with another club called Saleem Sports Club, to compete in the newly founded Iraqi National Second Division in the 1974–75 season. Al-Zawraa won the second division title that season under Rasheed Radhi's leadership, being promoted into the Iraqi National League for the first time in their history for the 1975–76 season.

A club named Al-Naqil (meaning 'Transport'), who were attached to the Ministry of Transport, were the runners-up of the 1974–75 Iraqi National League, but the club was dissolved due to a lack of financial backing. Al-Naqil's players joined newly promoted side Al-Zawraa, who were founded by the Minister of Transport, Adnan Ayoub Sabri Al-Ezzi. This meant that Al-Zawraa became one of the strongest clubs in Iraq from their first season in the top-flight, which was the 1975–76 season, where they won both the league title and the Iraq FA Cup. In the 1976–77 season, Al-Zawraa retained their title, winning the league undefeated, and the 1978–79 season saw Al-Zawraa win the league undefeated again, also winning the Iraq FA Cup to secure their second double.

=== League decline but cup success (1980–1989) ===
The 1980s remain the only decade in which Al-Zawraa failed to secure a league title, marking a relative decline after their dominant emergence in the late 1970s. This period coincided with the gradual departure of several key players from the club's golden generation, leading to a phase of transition and rebuilding. Despite these challenges, Al-Zawraa maintained their status as one of Iraq's leading teams through consistent performances in cup competitions.

The club enjoyed notable success in the Iraq FA Cup, winning three titles during the decade. They defeated league champions Al-Talaba 1–0 in the 1981 final thanks to a goal from Thamer Yousif, securing their third FA Cup crown, before retaining the trophy in 1982 with a 2–1 victory over the same opponents in the final. Later in the decade, Al-Zawraa claimed their fifth FA Cup title in 1989, beating Al-Tayaran 3–0 in a dominant final performance.

Following a difficult first half of the decade in which the club even flirted with relegation, a rebuilding process led by former player Falah Hassan gradually restored competitiveness. By the late 1980s, Al-Zawraa had re-established themselves among the top teams in Iraq, finishing in the upper half of the league and returning to trophy-winning form. This resurgence also culminated in regional success, as Al-Zawraa won the inaugural Arab Cooperation Council Club Championship in 1989 in Amman, defeating teams from Egypt, Jordan and Yemen. They successfully defended the title in 1990, confirming their return as a major force ahead of what would become the most successful period in the club's history during the 1990s.

=== Golden era and domestic dominance (1990–2003) ===
They began the 1990s by winning the Iraq FA Cup again and qualifying to the 1990 Arab Club Champions Cup, which was eventually abandoned. The 1990s would go on to become the most successful in Al-Zawraa's history, as they were crowned champions of Iraq for the fourth time in 1990–91 and also won another Iraq FA Cup to secure another double. Al-Zawraa won the first ever edition of the Umm al-Ma'arik Championship (later known as the Baghdad Championship) in the 1991–92 season and they succeeded in winning another Iraq FA Cup in the 1992–93 season.

The next three seasons were three of the best in Al-Zawraa's history; they won three consecutive doubles in 1993–94, 1994–95 and 1995–96. They also participated in their first ever AFC tournaments, being knocked out in the first round of the 1993–94 Asian Cup Winners' Cup and the second round of the 1995 Asian Club Championship. Al-Zawraa recorded their best participation in the Asian Club Championship in 1996–97 as they reached the semi-finals, eventually finishing fourth. Al-Zawraa won the 1997–98 Iraq FA Cup which saw manager Anwar Jassam win his record fifth FA Cup, and followed that up by winning their first Iraqi Super Cup with a 1–0 win over league champions Al-Shorta. In the 1997–98 Asian Club Championship, Al-Zawraa reached the second round before being knocked out.

Al-Zawraa continued to dominate Iraqi football by winning the double in 1998–99 and securing their first domestic quadruple in 1999–2000 by winning all four domestic trophies. They also reached the final of the 1999–2000 Asian Cup Winners' Cup, the furthest that they have ever reached in a major continental competition, but lost 1–0 to Shimizu S-Pulse of Japan.

As champions, Al-Zawraa qualified for the 2000–01 Asian Club Championship but were knocked out in the first round. Al-Zawraa won their third consecutive league title in 2000–01 and also won the Iraqi Super Cup, while they reached the second round of the 2001–02 Asian Club Championship and lost to Al-Sadd in 2002–03 AFC Champions League qualification.

=== Post-war era and further titles (2004–2018) ===
Al-Zawraa won the Baghdad Championship in the 2003–04 season, the first tournament played in Iraq since the outbreak of the Iraq War, becoming joint-record winners of the competition in the process. In the 2003–04 Arab Champions League, Al-Zawraa were knocked out at the round of 16, while they were knocked out at the group stage of the 2005 AFC Champions League. In the 2005–06 season, Al-Zawraa secured their 11th league title by defeating Al-Najaf via a penalty shootout after a goalless draw, while in the 2005–06 Arab Champions League, they were defeated over two legs by MC Algiers in the round of 16. Al-Zawraa also participated in the 2007 AFC Champions League (knocked out in the group stage) and the 2009 AFC Cup (knocked out in the round of 16 by Erbil).

In 2010–11, they returned to the top of Iraqi football by winning their 12th league title after a penalty shootout win over Erbil. This qualified them to the 2012 AFC Cup but they were knocked out in the round of 16. Al-Zawraa won the 2015–16 league title without losing a game in what was their 13th league title. They then won the 2016–17 Iraq FA Cup and 2017 Iraqi Super Cup titles, coupling the latter with the 2017–18 Iraqi Premier League title which saw them extend their national record to 14 league triumphs.

=== Recent years (2019–present) ===
After knockout stage and group stage exits in the AFC Cup in 2017 and 2018 respectively, Al-Zawraa returned to the AFC Champions League in 2019, collecting eight points but failing to advance to the next round. The team had two impressive games against Al-Wasl, beating them 5–0 in Karbala and 5–1 at Zabeel Stadium.

Al-Zawraa won the 2018–19 Iraq FA Cup, thus qualifying to the qualifying rounds of the AFC Champions League in 2020 and 2021 where they were eliminated both times. Al-Zawraa won their fifth Iraqi Super Cup title in 2021.. In the 2020–21 Iraqi Premier League they finished as runners‑up behind Al‑Quwa Al‑Jawiya. The following season saw a drop in form as they finished sixth in 2021–22, before improving to third place in both 2022–23 and 2023–24. In the 2020–21 Iraq FA Cup they reached the final but lost on penalties to Al‑Quwa Al‑Jawiya after a goalless draw.

On the continental stage, they entered the 2022 AFC Champions League play‑off round but were eliminated by Sharjah on penalties, therefore failing to reach the group stage. In 2023 they competed in the AFC Cup, but narrowly missed out on the knockout stage as they were not among the best second‑placed teams in the West Zone. In 2024–25 they again finished second in the league, securing qualification for the 2025–26 AFC Champions League Two group stage.

== Stadium ==
Al-Zawraa currently play at Al-Zawraa Stadium, which has a capacity of 15,443. Al-Zawraa sometimes play their derby matches against Al-Quwa Al-Jawiya, Al-Shorta and Al-Talaba at Al-Shaab Stadium.

== Current squad ==
=== First-team squad ===
As of 17 August 2026

Note: Flags indicate national team as defined under FIFA eligibility rules; some limited exceptions apply. Players may hold more than one non-FIFA nationality.

No.	Pos.	Nation	Player
1	GK	IRQ	Ahmed Basil
3	DF	IRQ	Masies Artien
4	MF	IRQ	Louaï El Ani
6	MF	IRQ	Hussein Falah
7	MF	IRQ	Hiran Ahmed
8	FW	URU	Nicolás Fernández
10	MF	IRQ	Mohammed Qasim Majid
11	FW	URU	Maicol Cabrera
13	DF	IRQ	Yasir Wissam
14	DF	IRQ	Kadhim Raad
15	MF	CIV	Ismaila Soro

No.	Pos.	Nation	Player
16	MF	IRQ	Ameer Abdullah
18	FW	IRQ	Youssef Aziz
21	GK	IRQ	Mojtaba Mohammed
22	MF	NGR	Ededem Essien
25	DF	IRQ	Sajjad Mahdi
27	DF	IRQ	Sajjad Fadhil
40	GK	IRQ	Ali Jadaan
44	DF	UZB	Marlen Chobanov
53	DF	IRQ	Ali Adnan (captain)
72	FW	EGY	Mohamed Sherif
79	FW	IRQ	Hussein Zayad
77	DF	IRQ	Ameer Sabah
99	FW	IRQ	Hasan Abdulkareem

=== Out on loan ===
Note: Flags indicate national team as defined under FIFA eligibility rules; some limited exceptions apply. Players may hold more than one non-FIFA nationality.

No.	Pos.	Nation	Player

=== Notable players ===
For a list of all Al-Zawraa players, see List of Al-Zawraa players

== Rivalries ==
Al-Zawraa's main rivals are Al-Quwa Al-Jawiya, with whom they contest the Iraqi Classico. They are also rivals with Al-Shorta and Al-Talaba.

== Managers ==
The table below shows Al-Zawraa managers of the last 10 years that have won noteworthy titles. For a more detailed and chronological list of Al-Zawraa managers from 1969 onwards with their trophies, see List of Al-Zawraa managers.

=== Notable managers ===
Name	Period	Trophies
(Iraq) Basim Qasim	2015–16	Iraqi Premier League: 2015–16 Winners
(Iraq) Essam Hamad	2016–17	Iraq FA Cup: 2016–17 Winners
(Iraq) Ayoub Odisho	2017–19	Iraqi Super Cup: 2017 Winners; Iraqi Premier League: 2017–18 Winners
(Iraq) Hakim Shaker	2019	Iraq FA Cup: 2018–19 Winners
(Iraq) Essam Hamad	2021	Iraqi Super Cup: 2021 Winners

=== Current technical staff ===
Position	Name	Nationality
Head coach:	Basim Qasim	(Iraq)
Assistant coach:	Rahim Hameed	(Iraq)
Assistant coach:	Ahmed Jassim	(Iraq)
Goalkeeping coach:	Hashim Khamis	(Iraq)
Fitness coach:	Nasser Abdul-Amir	(Iraq)
Fitness coach:	Renas Ismail	(Iraq)

Updated to match played 10 July 2026

== Honours ==
=== National ===
Competition	Titles	Seasons
Iraq Stars League	14	1975–76, 1976–77, 1978–79, 1990–91, 1993–94, 1994–95, 1995–96, 1998–99, 1999–2000, 2000–01, 2005–06, 2010–11, 2015–16, 2017–18
Iraqi Premier Division League (second tier)	1	1974–75
Iraq FA Cup	16	1975–76, 1978–79, 1980–81, 1981–82, 1988–89, 1989–90, 1990–91, 1992–93, 1993–94, 1994–95, 1995–96, 1997–98, 1998–99, 1999–2000, 2016–17, 2018–19
Iraqi Super Cup	5	1998, 1999, 2000, 2017, 2021
Baghdad Championship	3^{s}	1991–92, 1999–2000, 2003–04

- record
- ^{S} shared record

=== Regional ===
Competition	Titles	Seasons
Iraq Central FA Third Division	1	1973–74
Iraq Central FA Fourth Division	1	1970–71

=== Friendly ===
Competition	Titles	Seasons
Tournament for the Iraqi Armed Forces	1	2015
Tishreen Tournament	1	2004
Al-Zawraa Championship	1	2004
Al-Quds International Championship	1	2000
Al-Shaab Friendship Tournament	1	1999
Arab Cooperation Council Club Championship	2	1989, 1990
Victory Championship	2	1984, 1986

== Statistics ==
=== In domestic competitions ===
==== National ====
Year	League	Iraq Cup	Super Cup	Baghdad Ch'ship
1974–75	Promoted (Div. 1)	not held	Started in 1986	Started in 1991
1975–76	Winner	Winner	Started in 1986	Started in 1991
1976–77	Winner	not held	Started in 1986	Started in 1991
1977–78	Runner-up	Quarter-final	Started in 1986	Started in 1991
1978–79	Winner	Winner	Started in 1986	Started in 1991
1979–80	Runner-up	Semi-final	Started in 1986	Started in 1991
1980–81	Seventh place	Winner	Started in 1986	Started in 1991
1981–82	Fifth place	Winner	Started in 1986	Started in 1991
1982–83	Seventh place	Quarter-final	Started in 1986	Started in 1991
1983–84	Fifth place	Quarter-final	Started in 1986	Started in 1991
1984–85	not finished	Second round	Started in 1986	Started in 1991
1985–86	Ninth place	not held	did not qualify	Started in 1991
1986–87	Seventh place	Quarter-final	not held	Started in 1991
1987–88	Fifth place	Runner-up	not held	Started in 1991
1988–89	Fourth place	Winner	not held	Started in 1991
1989–90	Fourth place	Winner	not held	Started in 1991
1990–91	Winner	Winner	not held	Started in 1991
1991–92	Runner-up	Round of 32	not held	Winner
1992–93	Runner-up	Winner	not held	Third place
1993–94	Winner	Winner	not held	Third place
1994–95	Winner	Winner	not held	Third place
1995–96	Winner	Winner	not held	Third place
1996–97	Runner-up	Semi-final	Runner-up	Runner-up
1997–98	Third place	Winner	Winner	Third place
1998–99	Winner	Winner	not held	Group stage
1999–2000	Winner	Winner	Winner	Winner
2000–01	Winner	not held	Winner	Runner-up
2001–02	Fourth place	Quarter-final	Runner-up	Group stage
2002–03	not finished	Round of 32	did not qualify	Third place
2003–04	not finished	not held	not held	Winner
2004–05	Fourth place	not held	not held	Abolished in 2004
2005–06	Winner	not held	not held	Abolished in 2004
2006–07	Eighth place	not held	not held	Abolished in 2004
2007–08	Runner-up	not held	not held	Abolished in 2004
2008–09	Seventh place	not held	not held	Abolished in 2004
2009–10	Third place	not held	not held	Abolished in 2004
2010–11	Winner	not held	not held	Abolished in 2004
2011–12	Eighth place	not held	not held	Abolished in 2004
2012–13	Fourth place	Round of 32	not held	Abolished in 2004
2013–14	Sixth place	not held	not held	Abolished in 2004
2014–15	Eighth place	not held	not held	Abolished in 2004
2015–16	Winner	Runner-up	not held	Abolished in 2004
2016–17	Fourth place	Winner	not held	Abolished in 2004
2017–18	Winner	not held	Winner	Abolished in 2004
2018–19	Third place	Winner	not held	Abolished in 2004
2019–20	not finished	not finished	Runner-up	Abolished in 2004
2020–21	Runner-up	Runner-up	not held	Abolished in 2004
2021–22	Sixth place	Semi-final	Winner	Abolished in 2004
2022–23	Third place	Quarter-final	did not qualify	Abolished in 2004
2023–24	Third place	Semi-final	not held	Abolished in 2004
2024–25	Runner-up	Round of 16	not held	Abolished in 2004
2025–26	Fourth place	not finished	not held	Abolished in 2004

=== In international competitions ===
As of 17 February 2026

Competition	Record				
Competition	G	W	D	L	Win %
AFC Champions League Elite	44	19	9	16	43.18
AFC Champions League Two	42	20	11	11	47.62
Asian Cup Winners' Cup	8	4	1	3	50.00
Arab Club Champions Cup	17	5	4	8	29.41
Total	111	48	25	38	43.24

== Performance in AFC competitions ==
- AFC Champions League Elite: 7 appearances

2003: Third qualifying round
2005: Group stage
2007: Group stage
2019: Group stage
2020: Second qualifying round
2021: Qualifying play-off round
2022: Qualifying play-off round

- AFC Champions League Two: 6 appearances

2009: Round of 16
2012: Round of 16
2017: Zonal semi-final
2018: Group stage
2023–24: Group stage
2025–26: Round of 16

- Asian Club Championship: 5 appearances

1996: Second round
1997: Fourth place
1998: Second round
2001: First round
2002: Second round

- Asian Cup Winners' Cup: 2 appearances

1994: First round
2000: Runners-up

== See also ==
- Iraqi clubs in the AFC Club Competitions
