= List of Iraq Stars League hat-tricks =

This article displays a list of Iraq Stars League hat-tricks. The goals scored represent players who have scored three goals (a hat-trick) or more in a single league match in Iraq's top football division since its first edition in 1974.

== Notable events ==
- The first hat-trick was scored by Thamer Yousif for Al-Naqil in a win over Al-Shorta on 12 October 1974.
- Thamer Yousif is the first player to score five goals in Al-Naqil's win over Al-Shorta on 12 October 1974.
- Shakir Mohammed Sabbar is the first player to score six goals in Al-Ramadi's win over Kirkuk on 15 May 1995.
- The Cameroonian player Jean Michel N'Lend is the first non-Iraqi player to score a hat-trick in Al-Shorta's win over Al-Quwa Al-Jawiya on 18 November 2012.
- Al-Zawraa is the club with the most hat-tricks scored by its players with a total of 48.
- Sahib Abbas and Qahtan Chathir have scored the most hat-tricks, with ten.

== Hat-tricks ==
Key
| ^{4} | Player scored four goals |
| ^{5} | Player scored five goals |
| ^{6} | Player scored six goals |
| | The home team |

| Player | Nationality | For | Against | Result | Date | Stadium | Ref |
|---|---|---|---|---|---|---|---|
| Thamer Yousif^{5} | Iraq | Al-Naqil | Al-Shorta | 11–0 | 12 October 1974 | | |
| Ali Hussein Mahmoud | Iraq | Al-Shorta | Al-Jaish | 3–1 | 17 October 1974 | | |
| Salah Obeid | Iraq | Al-Tayaran | Al-Jaish | 4–0 | 17 November 1974 | | |
| Kadhim Luaibi | Iraq | Al-Naqil | Al-Rafidain | 7–1 | 25 January 1975 | | |
| Thamer Yousif | Iraq | Al-Naqil | Al-Rafidain | 7–1 | 25 January 1975 | | |
| Ali Kadhim | Iraq | Al-Naqil | Al-Muwasalat | 3–0 | 14 March 1975 | | |
| Falah Hassan | Iraq | Al-Zawraa | Al-Hilla | 4–1 | 1975–76 | | |
| Zahrawi Jaber | Iraq | Al-Shorta | Al-Samawa | 5–0 | 1975–76 | | |
| Jassim Mohammed | Iraq | Al-Hilla | Diyala | 3–0 | 1975–76 | | |
| Hazem Jassam | Iraq | Al-Zawraa | Al-Minaa | 5–1 | 11 March 1977 | | |
| Hassan Saddawi | Iraq | Al-Jaish | Salahaddin | 3–1 | 25 October 1977 | | |
| Mahdi Jassim | Iraq | Al-Zawraa | Babil | 4–0 | 3 November 1977 | | |
| Salim Malakh | Iraq | Al-Tayaran | Salahaddin | 4–2 | 14 November 1977 | | |
| Jalil Hanoon^{4} | Iraq | Al-Minaa | Babil | 6–0 | 27 January 1978 | | |
| Falah Hassan | Iraq | Al-Zawraa | Al-Hilla | 4–0 | 27 January 1978 | | |
| Ali Hussein Mahmoud | Iraq | Al-Shorta | Al-Tijara | 5–2 | 1978–79 | | |
| Hussein Saeed | Iraq | Al-Talaba | Salahaddin | 4–1 | 10 October 1979 | | |
| Jalil Hanoon^{4} | Iraq | Al-Minaa | Al-Tayaran | 4–2 | 20 November 1979 | | |
| Ghazi Hashim | Iraq | Al-Amana | Al-Minaa | 4–0 | 3 January 1980 | | |
| Ara Hamparsum | Iraq | Al-Tayaran | Al-Tijara | 5–3 | 16 January 1980 | | |
| Adel Khudhair | Iraq | Al-Zawraa | Al-Bahri | 3–2 | 27 January 1980 | | |
| Hussein Saeed^{4} | Iraq | Al-Talaba | Al-Adhamiya | 6–0 | 16 February 1981 | | |
| Faisal Aziz | Iraq | Al-Shorta | Al-Amana | 3–1 | 26 April 1981 | | |
| Ali Hussein Mahmoud | Iraq | Al-Shorta | Al-Zawraa | 3–0 | 19 May 1981 | | |
| Rahim Hameed^{4} | Iraq | Al-Talaba | Al-Tijara | 5–1 | 14 May 1983 | | |
| Karim Allawi | Iraq | Al-Amana | Al-Minaa | 6–3 | 29 December 1983 | | |
| Aqeel Hato | Iraq | Al-Minaa | Al-Amana | 3–6 | 29 December 1983 | | |
| Hiyad Azhar^{4} | Iraq | Al-Tayaran | Al-Minaa | 6–3 | 12 January 1984 | | |
| Saad Jassim | Iraq | Al-Shabab | Al-Minaa | 4–0 | 2 March 1984 | | |
| Hassan Farhan | Iraq | Al-Jaish | Al-Tijara | 3–0 | 15 March 1984 | | |
| Jalil Hanoon | Iraq | Al-Minaa | Al-Zawraa | 3–3 | 20 October 1984 | | |
| Jalil Hanoon | Iraq | Al-Minaa | Wahid Huzairan | 3–0 | 1 January 1985 | | |
| Mohammed Jassim | Iraq | Al-Tayaran | Al-Amana | 4–1 | 28 November 1985 | | |
| Hussein Saeed^{4} | Iraq | Al-Talaba | Wahid Huzairan | 5–1 | 24 January 1986 | | |
| Rahim Hameed | Iraq | Al-Jaish | Al-Tijara | 4–0 | 24 January 1986 | | |
| Saad Jassim | Iraq | Al-Zawraa | Al-Tijara | 8–0 | 12 February 1986 | | |
| Jassim Ibrahim | Iraq | Al-Tayaran | Al-Mosul | 4–0 | 1986–87 | | |
| Tariq Abdul-Rahman | Iraq | Erbil | Al-Naft | 3–3 | 13 April 1988 | | |
| Mohammed Jassim | Iraq | Al-Tayaran | Al-Tijara | 7–2 | 11 October 1988 | | |
| Natiq Hashim^{4} | Iraq | Al-Tayaran | Al-Jaish | 4–2 | 7 November 1988 | | |
| Saad Abdul-Raheem | Iraq | Al-Zawraa | Al-Sulaikh | 3–2 | 2 March 1989 | | |
| Ahmed Radhi | Iraq | Al-Rasheed | Al-Bahri | 6–1 | 24 November 1989 | | |
| Jafar Omran | Iraq | Al-Naft | Samarra | 3–1 | 18 January 1990 | | |
| Abdul-Rahman Mahdi | Iraq | Samarra | Al-Minaa | 4–0 | 23 November 1990 | | |
| Natiq Hashim | Iraq | Al-Tayaran | Al-Shabab | 6–0 | 8 December 1990 | | |
| Sabah Jeayer | Iraq | Al-Talaba | Al-Sinaa | 3–0 | 8 April 1991 | | |
| Karim Saddam | Iraq | Al-Zawraa | Al-Sinaa | 4–0 | 20 April 1991 | | |
| Natiq Hashim | Iraq | Al-Quwa Al-Jawiya | Al-Sulaikh | 4–1 | 10 June 1991 | | |
| Ahmed Radhi | Iraq | Al-Zawraa | Al-Talaba | 3–2 | 3 October 1991 | | |
| Talib Farih | Iraq | Al-Sinaa | Samarra | 3–1 | 1 November 1991 | | |
| Karim Saddam | Iraq | Al-Zawraa | Al-Kut | 6–0 | 1 November 1991 | | |
| Mohammed Toma | Iraq | Al-Salam | Al-Sinaa | 4–0 | 7 November 1991 | | |
| Talib Farih | Iraq | Al-Sinaa | Erbil | 3–0 | 5 December 1991 | | |
| Rahim Hameed | Iraq | Al-Tayaran | Erbil | 5–1 | 12 December 1991 | | |
| Alaa Kadhim | Iraq | Al-Talaba | Samarra | 5–1 | 24 January 1992 | | |
| Ali Hashim | Iraq | Al-Najaf | Erbil | 4–0 | 14 May 1992 | | |
| Ahmed Radhi | Iraq | Al-Zawraa | Al-Tayaran | 3–1 | 12 June 1992 | | |
| Adnan Hamad | Iraq | Samarra | Al-Dawr Al-Ahli | 6–1 | 8 October 1992 | | |
| Mahdi Kadhim | Iraq | Al-Talaba | Al-Dawr Al-Ahli | 4–0 | 12 October 1992 | | |
| Ali Abdul-Kadhim^{4} | Iraq | Al-Karkh | Erbil | 5–1 | 15 October 1992 | | |
| Ahmed Radhi | Iraq | Al-Zawraa | Al-Salam | 5–0 | 29 October 1992 | | |
| Younis Abid Ali | Iraq | Al-Shorta | Samarra | 3–0 | 12 November 1992 | | |
| Ali Hashim | Iraq | Al-Najaf | Al-Ramadi | 4–1 | 7 December 1992 | | |
| Akram Emmanuel^{4} | Iraq | Al-Quwa Al-Jawiya | Erbil | 7–1 | 10 December 1992 | | |
| Karim Saddam | Iraq | Al-Zawraa | Samarra | 5–2 | 14 December 1992 | | |
| Muayad Judi | Iraq | Al-Amana | Al-Mosul | 3–2 | 14 December 1992 | | |
| Saad Qais | Iraq | Al-Karkh | Al-Salam | 4–0 | 17 December 1992 | | |
| Tariq Abdul-Rahman | Iraq | Erbil | Al-Shabab | 4–3 | 28 December 1992 | | |
| Ali Hashim^{4} | Iraq | Al-Najaf | Al-Salam | 6–1 | 4 February 1993 | | |
| Younis Abid Ali | Iraq | Al-Shorta | Kirkuk | 4–0 | 15 February 1993 | | |
| Majeed Abdul-Ridha | Iraq | Al-Talaba | Al-Shabab | 4–1 | 15 February 1993 | | |
| Mustafa Mohammed | Iraq | Al-Dawr Al-Ahli | Al-Karkh | 4–3 | 11 March 1993 | | |
| Younis Abid Ali | Iraq | Al-Shorta | Erbil | 3–0 | 15 March 1993 | | |
| Shakir Mohammed Sabbar | Iraq | Al-Zawraa | Al-Nasiriya | 7–1 | 19 April 1993 | | |
| Bassam Raouf | Iraq | Al-Quwa Al-Jawiya | Sulaymaniya | 7–0 | 13 May 1993 | | |
| Waleed Dhahid | Iraq | Al-Quwa Al-Jawiya | Sulaymaniya | 7–0 | 13 May 1993 | | |
| Karim Saddam | Iraq | Al-Zawraa | Erbil | 4–0 | 27 May 1993 | | |
| Mohamed Jassim Mahdi | Iraq | Al-Zawraa | Samarra | 5–0 | 6 June 1993 | | |
| Rahim Saeed | Iraq | Al-Kut | Al-Umal | 5–0 | 6 June 1993 | | |
| Ahmed Khalaf | Iraq | Al-Talaba | Samarra | 5–2 | 10 June 1993 | | |
| Ali Hashim | Iraq | Al-Najaf | Al-Nasiriya | 4–1 | 10 June 1993 | | |
| Younis Abid Ali | Iraq | Al-Shorta | Al-Quwa Al-Jawiya | 4–1 | 1 October 1993 | | |
| Abdul-Aziz Abdul-Nabi | Iraq | Al-Nasiriya | Iraq U19 | 4–2 | 1 October 1993 | | |
| Ali Raja | Iraq | Salahaddin | Al-Minaa | 5–1 | 8 October 1993 | | |
| Jafar Abdul-Hussein | Iraq | Al-Quwa Al-Jawiya | Al-Khutoot | 5–0 | 15 October 1993 | | |
| Mohamed Jassim Mahdi | Iraq | Al-Zawraa | Al-Sinaa | 4–0 | 10 November 1993 | | |
| Ziyad Tariq | Iraq | Iraq U19 | Kirkuk | 4–0 | 22 November 1993 | | |
| Ali Hashim | Iraq | Al-Najaf | Kirkuk | 7–0 | 23 December 1993 | | |
| Hussein Abdullah | Iraq | Al-Sinaa | Salahaddin | 6–1 | 23 December 1993 | | |
| Waleed Dhahid | Iraq | Al-Quwa Al-Jawiya | Al-Amara | 4–0 | 27 December 1993 | | |
| Safaa Adnan^{4} | Iraq | Al-Jaish | Kirkuk | 6–0 | 30 December 1993 | | |
| Mohanad Mahdi | Iraq | Al-Kut | Al-Ramadi | 4–2 | 27 January 1994 | | |
| Mohammed Toma | Iraq | Al-Amara | Karbala | 3–0 | 7 February 1994 | | |
| Younis Abid Ali | Iraq | Al-Shorta | Karbala | 5–0 | 21 February 1994 | | |
| Mohammed Mohammed Ameen^{4} | Iraq | Erbil | Babil | 5–1 | 28 February 1994 | | |
| Alaa Abdul-Jabbar^{4} | Iraq | Al-Shorta | Al-Sinaa | 4–0 | 3 March 1994 | | |
| Maad Ibrahim | Iraq | Al-Naft | Al-Umal | 4–1 | 7 March 1994 | | |
| Mahmoud Majeed | Iraq | Al-Jaish | Al-Mosul | 3–1 | 21 March 1994 | | |
| Waleed Dhahid | Iraq | Al-Quwa Al-Jawiya | Kirkuk | 5–1 | 24 March 1994 | | |
| Rahim Saeed | Iraq | Al-Kut | Al-Khutoot | 4–0 | 24 March 1994 | | |
| Mohammed Toma | Iraq | Al-Amara | Babil | 4–0 | 24 March 1994 | | |
| Hussam Fawzi | Iraq | Al-Zawraa | Kirkuk | 6–0 | 4 April 1994 | | |
| Talib Abed Awda | Iraq | Karbala | Erbil | 3–2 | 11 April 1994 | | |
| Haidar Nafea | Iraq | Diyala | Al-Karkh | 3–5 | 14 April 1994 | | |
| Mahmoud Majeed | Iraq | Al-Jaish | Kirkuk | 4–1 | 14 April 1994 | | |
| Ahmed Daham | Iraq | Al-Talaba | Al-Nasiriya | 8–2 | 18 April 1994 | | |
| Fareed Jafar | Iraq | Al-Quwa Al-Jawiya | Al-Sinaa | 4–0 | 13 October 1994 | | |
| Saad Qais | Iraq | Al-Shorta | Al-Karkh | 6–2 | 17 October 1994 | | |
| Mohanad Zaidan | Iraq | Al-Talaba | Al-Nasiriya | 4–0 | 17 October 1994 | | |
| Saad Qais^{4} | Iraq | Al-Shorta | Al-Diwaniya | 6–1 | 27 October 1994 | | |
| Mufeed Assem^{5} | Iraq | Al-Zawraa | Al-Jaish | 9–0 | 27 October 1994 | | |
| Yassir Abdul-Latif | Iraq | Al-Naft | Salahaddin | 4–1 | 3 November 1994 | | |
| Alaa Abdul-Jabbar | Iraq | Al-Shorta | Al-Mosul | 4–0 | 24 November 1994 | | |
| Haidar Yahya^{4} | Iraq | Al-Talaba | Karbala | 4–2 | 1 December 1994 | | |
| Qahtan Chathir | Iraq | Al-Sinaa | Kirkuk | 7–2 | 1 December 1994 | | |
| Qahtan Chathir | Iraq | Al-Sinaa | Karbala | 5–0 | 12 December 1994 | | |
| Sattar Khalaf | Iraq | Karbala | Al-Umal | 5–0 | 15 December 1994 | | |
| Adnan Mohammed | Iraq | Al-Jaish | Kirkuk | 7–1 | 22 December 1994 | | |
| Jafar Yaseen | Iraq | Kirkuk | Diyala | 3–3 | 26 December 1994 | | |
| Muayad Judi | Iraq | Al-Karkh | Erbil | 7–2 | 9 February 1995 | | |
| Shakir Mohammed Sabbar | Iraq | Al-Ramadi | Erbil | 5–0 | 23 February 1995 | | |
| Ali Raja | Iraq | Al-Najaf | Samarra | 4–0 | 23 February 1995 | | |
| Maad Ibrahim | Iraq | Al-Naft | Al-Shorta | 4–0 | 13 March 1995 | | |
| Fareed Jafar | Iraq | Al-Quwa Al-Jawiya | Al-Jaish | 7–1 | 16 March 1995 | | |
| Haidar Hamil^{4} | Iraq | Al-Kut | Erbil | 5–0 | 23 March 1995 | | |
| Qahtan Chathir | Iraq | Al-Sinaa | Kirkuk | 4–1 | 30 March 1995 | | |
| Adel Nasser | Iraq | Al-Minaa | Al-Umal | 6–1 | 30 March 1995 | | |
| Muayad Judi | Iraq | Al-Karkh | Diyala | 6–0 | 30 March 1995 | | |
| Younis Abid Ali | Iraq | Al-Shorta | Erbil | 5–2 | 6 April 1995 | | |
| Adnan Mohammed | Iraq | Al-Jaish | Kirkuk | 6–0 | 20 April 1995 | | |
| Sahib Abbas | Iraq | Al-Zawraa | Erbil | 5–0 | 24 April 1995 | | |
| Rahim Saeed | Iraq | Al-Kut | Al-Nasiriya | 4–1 | 4 May 1995 | | |
| Shakir Mohammed Sabbar^{6} | Iraq | Al-Ramadi | Kirkuk | 11–0 | 15 May 1995 | | |
| Ahmed Hameed | Iraq | Diyala | Al-Kut | 3–0 | 15 May 1995 | | |
| Qasim Farhan | Iraq | Al-Sinaa | Babil | 5–2 | 15 May 1995 | | |
| Karim Saddam | Iraq | Al-Sinaa | Al-Jaish | 3–0 | 1 November 1995 | | |
| Maad Ibrahim | Iraq | Al-Naft | Al-Jaish | 5–0 | 5 January 1996 | | |
| Ahmed Daham | Iraq | Al-Quwa Al-Jawiya | Al-Talaba | 5–1 | 18 April 1996 | | |
| Sahib Abbas^{6} | Iraq | Al-Zawraa | Al-Karkh | 6–0 | 18 October 1996 | | |
| Naeem Saddam | Iraq | Al-Zawraa | Samarra | 6–0 | 1 November 1996 | | |
| Hussam Fawzi | Iraq | Al-Zawraa | Al-Sulaikh | 3–1 | 15 November 1996 | | |
| Haidar Najim | Iraq | Al-Najaf | Samarra | 3–0 | 14 December 1996 | | |
| Sahib Abbas | Iraq | Al-Zawraa | Al-Sinaa | 3–0 | 27 December 1996 | | |
| Alaa Kadhim | Iraq | Al-Talaba | Al-Ramadi | 5–0 | 1 February 1997 | | |
| Alaa Kadhim | Iraq | Al-Talaba | Al-Karkh | 4–0 | 8 March 1997 | | |
| Mahmoud Karim | Iraq | Al-Talaba | Al-Sinaa | 5–0 | 11 April 1997 | | |
| Ahmed Jadiea | Iraq | Al-Karkh | Al-Ramadi | 5–0 | 16 April 1997 | | |
| Muayad Judi | Iraq | Al-Zawraa | Al-Quwa Al-Jawiya | 5–3 | 9 May 1997 | | |
| Salman Hussein | Iraq | Al-Najaf | Al-Sulaikh | 4–1 | 30 October 1997 | | |
| Mustafa Qasim^{4} | Iraq | Samarra | Al-Kut | 5–1 | 30 October 1997 | | |
| Bahaa Hussein | Iraq | Al-Kut | Al-Sinaa | 3–0 | 14 November 1997 | | |
| Hussam Fawzi | Iraq | Al-Zawraa | Al-Mosul | 5–0 | 12 December 1997 | | |
| Ahmed Radhi | Iraq | Al-Zawraa | Samarra | 5–0 | 19 December 1997 | | |
| Qahtan Chathir | Iraq | Al-Talaba | Al-Minaa | 7–0 | 19 December 1997 | | |
| Ahmed Zuhair | Iraq | Maysan | Diyala | 3–0 | 19 December 1997 | | |
| Alaa Kadhim^{6} | Iraq | Al-Talaba | Al-Mosul | 7–1 | 9 January 1998 | | |
| Hussein Abdullah | Iraq | Diyala | Samarra | 3–0 | 16 February 1998 | | |
| Sahib Abbas | Iraq | Al-Zawraa | Salahaddin | 3–2 | 19 March 1998 | | |
| Sahib Abbas | Iraq | Al-Zawraa | Maysan | 6–1 | 27 March 1998 | | |
| Qahtan Chathir^{4} | Iraq | Al-Talaba | Al-Kut | 9–1 | 17 April 1998 | | |
| Ali Hussein Awda^{4} | Iraq | Al-Najaf | Al-Kut | 6–0 | 22 May 1998 | | |
| Karim Shaker | Iraq | Al-Jaish | Al-Kadhimiya | 4–1 | 16 October 1998 | | |
| Mohanad Mahdi | Iraq | Duhok | Salahaddin | 6–1 | 6 November 1998 | | |
| Razzaq Farhan^{5} | Iraq | Al-Quwa Al-Jawiya | Samarra | 9–0 | 6 November 1998 | | |
| Razzaq Farhan | Iraq | Al-Quwa Al-Jawiya | Al-Najaf | 3–1 | 19 November 1998 | | |
| Abbas Rahim | Iraq | Al-Karkh | Al-Sulaikh | 3–1 | 19 February 1999 | | |
| Qahtan Chathir | Iraq | Al-Talaba | Diyala | 4–1 | 5 March 1999 | | |
| Abbas Rahim^{4} | Iraq | Al-Karkh | Maysan | 6–2 | 5 March 1999 | | |
| Waleed Dhahid | Iraq | Al-Quwa Al-Jawiya | Al-Najaf | 3–0 | 19 March 1999 | | |
| Hashim Ridha | Iraq | Al-Shorta | Al-Sulaikh | 4–0 | 31 March 1999 | | |
| Abbas Rahim | Iraq | Al-Zawraa | Maysan | 7–1 | 1 October 1999 | | |
| Qahtan Chathir^{5} | Iraq | Al-Karkh | Al-Kut | 7–0 | 1 October 1999 | | |
| Alaa Kadhim | Iraq | Al-Talaba | Al-Ramadi | 4–2 | 15 October 1999 | | |
| Mushtaq Kadhim | Iraq | Al-Naft | Karbala | 5–0 | 15 October 1999 | | |
| Majid Abbas^{5} | Iraq | Al-Najaf | Al-Samawa | 8–2 | 18 October 1999 | | |
| Qahtan Chathir | Iraq | Al-Karkh | Maysan | 9–0 | 25 October 1999 | | |
| Ammar Abdul-Hussein | Iraq | Al-Karkh | Maysan | 9–0 | 25 October 1999 | | |
| Ziad Mahmoud | Iraq | Erbil | Al-Naft | 6–1 | 25 October 1999 | | |
| Ahmed Abdul-Jabar | Iraq | Al-Zawraa | Erbil | 5–1 | 30 October 1999 | | |
| Ammar Ahmed | Iraq | Al-Zawraa | Al-Kut | 5–0 | 5 November 1999 | | |
| Salah Hadi | Iraq | Al-Diwaniya | Kirkuk | 6–1 | 10 November 1999 | | |
| Essam Hamad | Iraq | Al-Zawraa | Al-Nasiriya | 7–1 | 22 November 1999 | | |
| Shakhwan Omar | Iraq | Erbil | Kirkuk | 7–0 | 29 November 1999 | | |
| Ehab Ibrahim | Iraq | Maysan | Duhok | 3–0 | 13 December 1999 | | |
| Akram Emmanuel | Iraq | Al-Quwa Al-Jawiya | Al-Mosul | 9–1 | 27 December 1999 | | |
| Saddam Aziz | Iraq | Karbala | Samarra | 4–0 | 27 December 1999 | | |
| Majid Awda | Iraq | Al-Nasiriya | Al-Talaba | 4–3 | 7 January 2000 | | |
| Abbas Hassan | Iraq | Al-Karkh | Al-Kut | 4–0 | 7 January 2000 | | |
| Ahmed Khudhair | Iraq | Al-Quwa Al-Jawiya | Erbil | 6–2 | 7 February 2000 | | |
| Mufeed Assem^{4} | Iraq | Al-Shorta | Al-Kut | 4–1 | 14 February 2000 | | |
| Mohammed Kadhim | Iraq | Erbil | Al-Ramadi | 6–1 | 14 February 2000 | | |
| Nabeel Anthil | Iraq | Kirkuk | Al-Kut | 3–3 | 21 February 2000 | | |
| Hashim Ridha^{4} | Iraq | Al-Shorta | Karbala | 6–2 | 24 February 2000 | | |
| Mohammed Kadhim | Iraq | Erbil | Samarra | 4–0 | 4 May 2000 | | |
| Mohammed Yousif | Iraq | Duhok | Al-Nasiriya | 5–1 | 15 May 2000 | | |
| Ahmed Jadiea^{4} | Iraq | Duhok | Maysan | 6–1 | 25 May 2000 | | |
| Qahtan Chathir | Iraq | Al-Karkh | Haifa | 4–0 | 2 June 2000 | | |
| Emad Mohammed | Iraq | Al-Zawraa | Al-Diwaniya | 4–0 | 8 June 2000 | | |
| Ahmed Sabri | Iraq | Al-Shorta | Diyala | 6–2 | 8 June 2000 | | |
| Qahtan Chathir | Iraq | Al-Karkh | Samarra | 7–0 | 8 June 2000 | | |
| Haidar Ayed | Iraq | Al-Nasiriya | Haifa | 6–1 | 15 June 2000 | | |
| Ammar Ahmed | Iraq | Al-Zawraa | Karbala | 8–0 | 5 January 2001 | | |
| Hashim Ridha | Iraq | Al-Shorta | Al-Najaf | 3–0 | 9 January 2001 | | |
| Ahmed Khalaf | Iraq | Samarra | Al-Ramadi | 4–0 | 9 January 2001 | | |
| Ali Mansour^{4} | Iraq | Al-Samawa | Al-Ramadi | 9–0 | 16 February 2001 | | |
| Mohsin Abdul-Nabi | Iraq | Al-Samawa | Al-Ramadi | 9–0 | 16 February 2001 | | |
| Alaa Abdul-Sattar | Iraq | Al-Zawraa | Al-Kut | 6–1 | 23 April 2001 | | |
| Hussein Abdullah | Iraq | Duhok | Karbala | 5–1 | 15 May 2001 | | |
| Dhurgham Ali | Iraq | Al-Quwa Al-Jawiya | Karbala | 5–1 | 20 May 2001 | | |
| Ahmed Khalaf^{4} | Iraq | Al-Karkh | Karbala | 7–0 | 28 May 2001 | | |
| Ahmed Khudhair | Iraq | Al-Shorta | Al-Difaa Al-Jawi | 3–1 | 8 June 2001 | | |
| Ahmed Khudhair^{5} | Iraq | Al-Shorta | Al-Kut | 5–1 | 14 June 2001 | | |
| Amer Mushraf | Iraq | Al-Shorta | Karbala | 7–0 | 22 June 2001 | | |
| Ahmed Khudhair | Iraq | Al-Quwa Al-Jawiya | Al-Sinaa | 4–1 | 22 September 2001 | | |
| Younis Mahmoud | Iraq | Al-Talaba | Kirkuk | 8–0 | 22 September 2001 | | |
| Sabah Jeayer | Iraq | Al-Talaba | Kirkuk | 8–0 | 22 September 2001 | | |
| Hashim Ridha^{4} | Iraq | Al-Shorta | Samarra | 7–0 | 27 September 2001 | | |
| Hassan Turki | Iraq | Al-Talaba | Al-Diwaniya | 3–0 | 12 October 2001 | | |
| Dhurgham Ali | Iraq | Al-Quwa Al-Jawiya | Kirkuk | 7–1 | 12 October 2001 | | |
| Hashim Ridha^{4} | Iraq | Al-Shorta | Al-Samawa | 4–0 | 29 October 2001 | | |
| Jumaa Khudhair | Iraq | Al-Difaa Al-Jawi | Al-Sinaa | 5–1 | 16 November 2001 | | |
| Hussein Abdullah | Iraq | Duhok | Al-Jaish | 5–0 | 21 December 2001 | | |
| Ahmed Khudhair | Iraq | Al-Quwa Al-Jawiya | Al-Samawa | 4–1 | 3 January 2002 | | |
| Ali Raja | Iraq | Al-Karkh | Samarra | 4–2 | 11 January 2002 | | |
| Arkan Mahmoud^{4} | Iraq | Al-Difaa Al-Jawi | Al-Diwaniya | 5–1 | 11 January 2002 | | |
| Majid Abbas | Iraq | Al-Diwaniya | Al-Jaish | 3–1 | 18 January 2002 | | |
| Hussein Abdullah | Iraq | Duhok | Samarra | 3–3 | 18 January 2002 | | |
| Hussam Fawzi | Iraq | Al-Zawraa | Al-Ramadi | 6–0 | 16 February 2002 | | |
| Amer Mushraf | Iraq | Al-Shorta | Al-Diwaniya | 8–1 | 11 March 2002 | | |
| Hashim Ridha | Iraq | Al-Shorta | Al-Diwaniya | 8–1 | 11 March 2002 | | |
| Sahib Abbas | Iraq | Al-Talaba | Al-Naft | 4–1 | 15 March 2002 | | |
| Hamid Qasim | Iraq | Al-Jaish | Al-Ramadi | 3–1 | 29 March 2002 | | |
| Qusay Hashim | Iraq | Al-Talaba | Al-Nasiriya | 6–1 | 1 April 2002 | | |
| Ehsan Hadi | Iraq | Al-Minaa | Al-Ramadi | 5–1 | 12 April 2002 | | |
| Hussam Fawzi^{4} | Iraq | Al-Zawraa | Al-Samawa | 6–0 | 19 April 2002 | | |
| Aqil Mutaab | Iraq | Al-Karkh | Al-Naft | 5–1 | 19 April 2002 | | |
| Faris Hameed | Iraq | Al-Jaish | Al-Shorta | 3–3 | 3 May 2002 | | |
| Ahmed Owaid | Iraq | Al-Najaf | Erbil | 5–0 | 3 May 2002 | | |
| Ahmed Khalaf | Iraq | Duhok | Al-Mosul | 4–1 | 6 September 2002 | | |
| Younis Mahmoud | Iraq | Al-Talaba | Al-Basra | 3–1 | 26 September 2002 | | |
| Ehsan Hadi | Iraq | Al-Minaa | Al-Samawa | 3–0 | 10 October 2002 | | |
| Hamid Qasim^{4} | Iraq | Erbil | Al-Naft | 5–1 | 11 October 2002 | | |
| Nashat Akram | Iraq | Al-Shorta | Duhok | 8–0 | 18 October 2002 | | |
| Hussam Fawzi | Iraq | Al-Zawraa | Al-Basra | 4–0 | 1 November 2002 | | |
| Amin Abbas | Iraq | Duhok | Samarra | 4–1 | 15 November 2002 | | |
| Ahmed Ibrahim | Iraq | Samarra | Al-Nasiriya | 3–1 | 22 November 2002 | | |
| Ahmed Mnajed | Iraq | Al-Shorta | Al-Samawa | 3–0 | 29 November 2002 | | |
| Mohammed Nasser | Iraq | Erbil | Al-Minaa | 5–0 | 20 December 2002 | | |
| Husham Mohammed | Iraq | Al-Zawraa | Kirkuk | 5–1 | 23 December 2002 | | |
| Basim Hamoud | Iraq | Al-Jaish | Al-Shorta | 4–1 | 20 February 2003 | | |
| Salim Khanjar | Iraq | Zakho | Al-Nasiriya | 6–1 | 7 March 2003 | | |
| Husham Mohammed | Iraq | Al-Zawraa | Kirkuk | 4–1 | 7 March 2003 | | |
| Muayad Judi | Iraq | Al-Sinaa | Samarra | 3–2 | 7 March 2003 | | |
| Hashim Ridha | Iraq | Al-Shorta | Diyala | 7–1 | 9 January 2004 | Al-Shorta Stadium | |
| Hussein Abdullah | Iraq | Erbil | Kirkuk | 4–1 | 10 May 2004 | Franso Hariri Stadium | |
| Sahib Abbas | Iraq | Karbala | Al-Shuala | 3–1 | 21 October 2004 | Al-Naft Stadium | |
| Alaa Kadhim | Iraq | Al-Talaba | Balad | 4–2 | 29 October 2004 | Al-Talaba Stadium | |
| Samer Saeed | Iraq | Erbil | Sulaymaniya | 5–0 | 27 December 2004 | Franso Hariri Stadium | |
| Ayad Shaalan | Iraq | Al-Sinaa | Al-Shuala | 3–0 | 13 January 2005 | Al-Sinaa Stadium | |
| Mustafa Karim^{4} | Iraq | Al-Kahrabaa | Salahaddin | 6–0 | 18 January 2005 | Al-Zawraa Stadium (original) | |
| Ali Mohammed | Iraq | Al-Najaf | Babil | 4–0 | 21 January 2005 | Babil Stadium | |
| Khalid Harbi | Iraq | Al-Nasiriya | Al-Basra | 4–2 | 17 February 2005 | Al-Basra Stadium | |
| Mushtaq Kadhim | Iraq | Al-Naft | Balad | 5–1 | 18 February 2005 | Al-Naft Stadium | |
| Mustafa Karim^{5} | Iraq | Al-Kahrabaa | Salahaddin | 7–2 | 15 April 2005 | Tikrit Stadium | |
| Ehsan Hadi | Iraq | Duhok | Erbil | 3–0 | 18 April 2005 | Duhok Stadium | |
| Waleed Jawad | Iraq | Balad | Salahaddin | 5–0 | 1 May 2005 | Balad Stadium | |
| Hussein Ridha | Iraq | Karbala | Duhok | 4–1 | 2 July 2005 | Duhok Stadium | |
| Ahmed Salah | Iraq | Al-Talaba | Kirkuk | 3–0 | 1 November 2005 | Al-Talaba Stadium | |
| Alaa Kadhim | Iraq | Al-Talaba | Zakho | 4–0 | 15 November 2005 | Al-Talaba Stadium | |
| Sahib Abbas | Iraq | Karbala | Al-Kut | 4–2 | 9 December 2005 | Karbala Stadium | |
| Sahib Abbas | Iraq | Karbala | Al-Kut | 5–0 | 3 March 2006 | Al-Kut Stadium | |
| Alaa Kalaf | Iraq | Al-Talaba | Ararat | 6–0 | 4 March 2006 | Al-Talaba Stadium | |
| Karrar Jassim | Iraq | Al-Najaf | Karbala | 3–1 | 21 April 2006 | Al-Najaf Stadium | |
| Akram Hashim | Iraq | Al-Quwa Al-Jawiya | Al-Shuala | 7–0 | 18 December 2007 | Al-Shaab Stadium | |
| Yassir Abdul-Mohsen | Iraq | Al-Quwa Al-Jawiya | Al-Shuala | 7–0 | 18 December 2007 | Al-Shaab Stadium | |
| Ali Mansoor^{4} | Iraq | Al-Quwa Al-Jawiya | Kirkuk | 6–3 | 17 July 2008 | Al-Quwa Al-Jawiya Stadium | |
| Younis Shakor | Iraq | Kirkuk | Al-Quwa Al-Jawiya | 3–6 | 17 July 2008 | Al-Quwa Al-Jawiya Stadium | |
| Ahmed Jadiea | Iraq | Al-Amana | Karbala | 3–0 | 14 November 2008 | Al-Quwa Al-Jawiya Stadium | |
| Sahib Abbas | Iraq | Karbala | Al-Samawa | 4–0 | 12 December 2008 | Karbala Stadium | |
| Ahmed Hanoon | Iraq | Al-Quwa Al-Jawiya | Al-Naft | 3–1 | 20 March 2009 | Al-Naft Stadium | |
| Zaid Abdul-Hamza | Iraq | Al-Kufa | Al-Nasiriya | 3–1 | 9 May 2009 | Al-Najaf Stadium | |
| Ahmed Salah | Iraq | Erbil | Al-Kahrabaa | 6–0 | 5 June 2009 | Al-Quwa Al-Jawiya Stadium | |
| Ammar Abdul-Hussein | Iraq | Masafi Al-Wasat | Al-Ramadi | 3–0 | 4 January 2010 | Al-Masafi Stadium | |
| Hammadi Ahmed | Iraq | Samarra | Salahaddin | 3–3 | 19 February 2010 | Tikrit Stadium | |
| Mohammed Salim^{4} | Iraq | Naft Maysan | Maysan | 5–0 | 30 April 2010 | Al-Kut Stadium | |
| Mustafa Ahmed | Iraq | Al-Zawraa | Samarra | 5–0 | 22 May 2010 | Al-Zawraa Stadium (original) | |
| Younis Rashid | Iraq | Masafi Al-Wasat | Al-Kahrabaa | 3–2 | 26 May 2010 | Al-Masafi Stadium | |
| Amjad Radhi | Iraq | Al-Quwa Al-Jawiya | Al-Kahrabaa | 4–1 | 10 June 2010 | Al-Zawraa Stadium (original) | |
| Qasim Mohammed | Iraq | Al-Diwaniya | Al-Kufa | 3–2 | 18 June 2010 | Al-Diwaniya Stadium | |
| Karrar Tariq | Iraq | Al-Talaba | Al-Samawa | 5–1 | 21 June 2010 | Al-Talaba Stadium | |
| Yassir Saadi | Iraq | Masafi Al-Wasat | Kirkuk | 4–3 | 29 June 2010 | Al-Masafi Stadium | |
| Mustafa Ahmed^{4} | Iraq | Al-Zawraa | Al-Shirqat | 4–1 | 6 July 2010 | Al-Shirqat Stadium | |
| Mustafa Jawad | Iraq | Al-Karkh | Duhok | 4–0 | 29 May 2011 | Al-Karkh Stadium | |
| Ahmed Salah^{4} | Iraq | Duhok | Al-Jaish | 5–0 | 12 July 2011 | Al-Jaish Stadium | |
| Hammadi Ahmed^{4} | Iraq | Al-Quwa Al-Jawiya | Al-Karkh | 4–0 | 2 February 2012 | Al-Karkh Stadium | |
| Amjad Radhi | Iraq | Erbil | Al-Minaa | 4–1 | 12 February 2012 | Naft Al-Junoob Stadium | |
| Haider Abdulelah | Iraq | Al-Najaf | Al-Taji | 4–1 | 2 June 2012 | Al-Najaf Stadium | |
| Marwan Hussein | Iraq | Al-Zawraa | Al-Taji | 6–1 | 17 August 2012 | Al-Taji Stadium | |
| Jean Michel N'Lend | Cameroon | Al-Shorta | Al-Quwa Al-Jawiya | 4–1 | 18 November 2012 | Al-Shaab Stadium | |
| Nasser Talla Dahilan^{4} | Iraq | Al-Minaa | Sulaymaniya | 5–2 | 27 January 2013 | Naft Al-Junoob Stadium | |
| Amjad Radhi | Iraq | Erbil | Kirkuk | 6–0 | 28 January 2013 | Franso Hariri Stadium | |
| Amjad Radhi | Iraq | Erbil | Al-Najaf | 4–1 | 28 February 2013 | Franso Hariri Stadium | |
| Hassan Hamoud | Iraq | Al-Minaa | Al-Sinaa | 6–0 | 12 April 2013 | Al-Sinaa Stadium | |
| Alaa Abdul-Zahra | Iraq | Duhok | Kirkuk | 4–0 | 19 April 2013 | Duhok Stadium | |
| Emad Mohammed | Iraq | Al-Zawraa | Kirkuk | 7–0 | 29 April 2013 | Al-Shorta Stadium | |
| Mustafa Jawda | Iraq | Al-Kahrabaa | Erbil | 3–5 | 6 May 2013 | Al-Shorta Stadium | |
| Firas Ismail | Iraq | Zakho | Al-Kahrabaa | 6–2 | 4 September 2013 | Barzan Stadium | |
| Younis Shakor | Iraq | Zakho | Al-Kahrabaa | 6–2 | 4 September 2013 | Barzan Stadium | |
| Ali Salah Hashim | Iraq | Al-Talaba | Al-Najaf | 5–0 | 24 December 2014 | Al-Quwa Al-Jawiya Stadium | |
| Marwan Hussein | Iraq | Al-Shorta | Al-Zawraa | 4–1 | 17 May 2015 | Al-Shaab Stadium | |
| Marwan Hussein | Iraq | Al-Shorta | Al-Zawraa | 4–1 | 21 June 2015 | Al-Shaab Stadium | |
| Marwan Hussein | Iraq | Al-Shorta | Al-Hudood | 3–2 | 26 November 2016 | Al-Shaab Stadium | |
| Aboubakar Koné | Ivory Coast | Al-Talaba | Al-Karkh | 3–0 | 20 December 2016 | Al-Karkh Stadium | |
| Mohanad Ali^{4} | Iraq | Al-Kahrabaa | Al-Karkh | 5–3 | 4 January 2017 | Al-Taji Stadium | |
| Abbas Abid | Iraq | Zakho | Al-Talaba | 3–4 | 11 January 2017 | Delal Stadium | |
| Yassir Abdul-Mohsen | Iraq | Al-Talaba | Zakho | 4–3 | 11 January 2017 | Delal Stadium | |
| Bassim Ali | Iraq | Naft Al-Junoob | Al-Samawa | 3–1 | 21 January 2017 | Basra International Stadium | |
| Alaa Abdul-Zahra | Iraq | Al-Zawraa | Al-Hussein | 6–4 | 16 May 2017 | Al-Shaab Stadium | |
| Ali Saad^{4} | Iraq | Al-Naft | Zakho | 6–0 | 17 May 2017 | Al-Naft Stadium | |
| Aboubakar Koné | Ivory Coast | Al-Kahrabaa | Al-Talaba | 4–0 | 10 December 2017 | Amanat Baghdad Stadium | |
| Aboubakar Koné | Ivory Coast | Al-Kahrabaa | Al-Samawa | 3–2 | 15 December 2017 | Al-Taji Stadium | |
| Mohammed Dawood | Iraq | Al-Naft | Al-Diwaniya | 4–0 | 28 January 2018 | Afak Stadium | |
| Wissam Saadoun | Iraq | Naft Maysan | Al-Talaba | 3–0 | 31 March 2018 | Maysan Olympic Stadium | |
| Manar Taha | Iraq | Al-Sinaat Al-Kahrabaiya | Al-Talaba | 4–2 | 14 April 2018 | Al-Sinaa Stadium | |
| Mustafa Karim | Iraq | Al-Minaa | Al-Diwaniya | 4–2 | 29 April 2018 | Al-Fayhaa Stadium | |
| Wissam Saadoun | Iraq | Naft Maysan | Al-Hussein | 5–1 | 23 June 2018 | Maysan Olympic Stadium | |
| Mohammed Dawood | Iraq | Al-Naft | Al-Minaa | 4–2 | 4 November 2018 | Al-Sinaa Stadium | |
| Alassane Diallo | Senegal | Al-Shorta | Al-Diwaniya | 7–1 | 7 December 2018 | Al-Diwaniya Stadium | |
| Alaa Abdul-Zahra | Iraq | Al-Shorta | Al-Diwaniya | 7–1 | 7 December 2018 | Al-Diwaniya Stadium | |
| Mohammed Dawood^{4} | Iraq | Al-Naft | Naft Al-Junoob | 5–1 | 17 December 2018 | Al-Fayhaa Stadium | |
| Marwan Hussein | Iraq | Al-Talaba | Naft Al-Junoob | 4–1 | 1 February 2019 | Al-Sinaa Stadium | |
| Shareef Abdul-Kadhim | Iraq | Al-Hudood | Al-Karkh | 3–5 | 15 February 2019 | Al-Karkh Stadium | |
| Mohammed Shokan | Iraq | Al-Minaa | Al-Samawa | 3–0 | 29 March 2019 | Al-Fayhaa Stadium | |
| Alaa Abdul-Zahra | Iraq | Al-Shorta | Al-Kahrabaa | 5–3 | 10 May 2019 | Al-Shaab Stadium | |
| Omar Mansouri | Morocco | Al-Zawraa | Naft Al-Wasat | 3–3 | 16 May 2019 | Al-Shaab Stadium | |
| Hammadi Ahmed | Iraq | Al-Quwa Al-Jawiya | Al-Shorta | 3–2 | 23 May 2019 | Al-Shaab Stadium | |
| Alaa Abbas | Iraq | Al-Zawraa | Al-Talaba | 5–0 | 2 June 2019 | Al-Shaab Stadium | |
| Farhan Shakor | Iraq | Al-Naft | Al-Talaba | 4–1 | 16 June 2019 | Al-Shaab Stadium | |
| Aymen Hussein | Iraq | Al-Quwa Al-Jawiya | Al-Sinaat Al-Kahrabaiya | 3–0 | 22 February 2020 | Al-Sinaa Stadium | |
| Mousa Adnan | Iraq | Al-Naft | Al-Samawa | 3–1 | 12 December 2020 | Al-Shaab Stadium | |
| Aymen Hussein | Iraq | Al-Quwa Al-Jawiya | Al-Naft | 4–1 | 31 January 2021 | Al-Shaab Stadium | |
| Wakaa Ramadan | Iraq | Al-Talaba | Al-Minaa | 4–2 | 4 July 2021 | Al-Shaab Stadium | |
| Farhan Shakor | Iraq | Amanat Baghdad | Al-Qasim | 3–0 | 20 April 2022 | Amanat Baghdad Stadium | |
| Nasser Al-Gahwashi | Yemen | Naft Al-Wasat | Al-Naft | 3–3 | 29 November 2022 | Al-Madina Stadium | |
| Husham Ahmed | Iraq | Al-Sinaa | Erbil | 4–0 | 6 February 2023 | Franso Hariri Stadium | |
| Aso Rostam | Iraq | Al-Shorta | Naft Maysan | 3–0 | 23 February 2023 | Al-Shaab Stadium | |
| Denny Antwi | Ghana | Al-Naft | Al-Karkh | 3–2 | 30 May 2023 | Al-Shaab Stadium | |
| Muhaimen Salim^{4} | Iraq | Al-Kahrabaa | Al-Diwaniya | 5–0 | 15 July 2023 | Al-Zawraa Stadium | |
| Alaa Al Dali | Syria | Naft Maysan | Al-Talaba | 4–0 | 4 November 2023 | Al-Zawraa Stadium | |
| Alaa Al Dali | Syria | Naft Maysan | Al-Minaa | 3–0 | 1 December 2023 | Maysan Olympic Stadium | |
| Aymen Hussein | Iraq | Al-Quwa Al-Jawiya | Al-Minaa | 4–2 | 10 February 2024 | Al-Shaab Stadium | |
| Okiki Afolabi | Nigeria | Al-Naft | Naft Al-Wasat | 4–0 | 17 February 2024 | Al-Najaf International Stadium | |
| Mohammed Qasim Nassif | Iraq | Erbil | Karbala | 5–3 | 19 February 2024 | Karbala International Stadium | |
| Aymen Hussein | Iraq | Al-Quwa Al-Jawiya | Al-Naft | 4–1 | 4 March 2024 | Al-Madina Stadium | |
| Marwan Hussein | Iraq | Newroz | Al-Minaa | 4–1 | 25 April 2024 | Al-Minaa Olympic Stadium | |
| Ibrahim Tomiwa | Nigeria | Newroz | Al-Quwa Al-Jawiya | 4–2 | 31 May 2024 | Sulaymaniya Stadium | |
| William Jebor^{4} | Liberia | Al-Minaa | Naft Al-Wasat | 4–2 | 18 June 2024 | Al-Fayhaa Stadium | |
| Mohanad Ali | Iraq | Al-Shorta | Diyala | 6–0 | 26 September 2024 | Al-Madina Stadium | |
| Mohanad Ali | Iraq | Al-Shorta | Erbil | 4–1 | 4 January 2025 | Al-Shaab Stadium | |
| Marwan Hussein | Iraq | Newroz | Al-Minaa | 5–1 | 4 February 2025 | Al-Fayhaa Stadium | |
| Gustavo Henrique | Brazil | Zakho | Al-Qasim | 6–2 | 9 February 2025 | Zakho International Stadium | |
| Mohanad Ali | Iraq | Al-Shorta | Naft Maysan | 4–0 | 13 March 2025 | Maysan Olympic Stadium | |
| Youssouf Oumarou | Niger | Al-Karma | Al-Qasim | 3–1 | 7 May 2025 | Al-Najaf International Stadium | |
| Mohammed Jawad | Iraq | Al-Quwa Al-Jawiya | Karbala | 4–1 | 13 May 2025 | Karbala International Stadium | |
| Leonel Ateba | Cameroon | Al-Shorta | Al-Karkh | 3–0 | 20 November 2025 | Al-Shaab Stadium | |
| Kingsley Fidelis Kuku | Nigeria | Al-Gharraf | Amanat Baghdad | 3–2 | 26 January 2026 | Al-Nasiriya International Stadium | |
| Lucas Santos | Brazil | Al-Kahrabaa | Amanat Baghdad | 5–0 | 22 February 2026 | Sharar Haidar Stadium | |
| Sherzod Temirov | Uzbekistan | Erbil | Al-Minaa | 3–2 | 13 March 2026 | Franso Hariri Stadium | |
| Yassin Samia | Syria | Al-Minaa | Amanat Baghdad | 4–0 | 21 April 2026 | Al-Minaa Olympic Stadium | |
| Alaa Al Dali^{4} | Syria | Al-Mosul | Diyala | 4–0 | 26 April 2026 | Diyala Stadium | |
| Younis Hamoud^{4} | Iraq | Al-Karkh | Al-Najaf | 5–2 | 20 May 2026 | Al-Najaf International Stadium | |
| Saif Rasheed | Iraq | Al-Talaba | Duhok | 3–3 | 22 August 2026 | Duhok Stadium | |
| Ifeanyi Eze | Nigeria | Erbil | Karbala | 3–0 | 18 September 2026 | Karbala International Stadium | |

== Statistics ==
=== Hat-tricks by player ===
The following table lists the players who scored five or more hat-tricks.

| Rank | Player | Hat-tricks |
|---|---|---|
| 1 | (Iraq) Sahib Abbas | 10 |
| 1 | (Iraq) Qahtan Chathir | 10 |
| 3 | (Iraq) Alaa Kadhim | 7 |
| 3 | (Iraq) Hashim Ridha | 7 |
| 3 | (Iraq) Marwan Hussein | 7 |
| 6 | (Iraq) Hussam Fawzi | 6 |
| 6 | (Iraq) Hussein Abdullah | 6 |
| 6 | (Iraq) Younis Abid Ali | 6 |
| 9 | (Iraq) Ahmed Khudhair | 5 |
| 9 | (Iraq) Ahmed Radhi | 5 |
| 9 | (Iraq) Ali Hashim | 5 |
| 9 | (Iraq) Karim Saddam | 5 |
| 9 | (Iraq) Muayad Judi | 5 |

=== Hat-tricks by nationality ===
The following table lists the number of hat-tricks scored by players from a single nation.

| Rank | Nation | Hat-tricks |
|---|---|---|
| 1 | Iraq | 351 |
| 2 | Nigeria | 4 |
| 2 | Syria | 4 |
| 4 | Ivory Coast | 3 |
| 5 | Brazil | 2 |
| 5 | Cameroon | 2 |
| 7 | Ghana | 1 |
| 7 | Liberia | 1 |
| 7 | Morocco | 1 |
| 7 | Niger | 1 |
| 7 | Senegal | 1 |
| 7 | Uzbekistan | 1 |
| 7 | Yemen | 1 |

=== Hat-tricks by club ===
The following table lists the clubs whose players have scored ten or more hat-tricks.

| Rank | Club | Hat-tricks |
|---|---|---|
| 1 | Al-Zawraa | 48 |
| 2 | Al-Shorta | 42 |
| 3 | Al-Quwa Al-Jawiya | 40 |
| 4 | Al-Talaba | 37 |
| 5 | Al-Karkh | 18 |
| 5 | Erbil | 18 |
| 7 | Al-Naft | 15 |
| 8 | Al-Minaa | 14 |
| 8 | Al-Najaf | 14 |
| 10 | Al-Jaish | 12 |
| 11 | Al-Sinaa | 11 |
| 11 | Duhok | 11 |
