= 1992–93 Iraqi National League =

Iraqi National League
- Season: 1992–93
- Champions: Al-Talaba (4th title)
- Relegated: Al-Tijara; Al-Amana; Al-Salam; Al-Dawr Al-Ahli; Sulaymaniya
- Asian Cup Winners' Cup: Al-Zawraa
- Top goalscorer: Karim Saddam (33 goals)

The 1992–93 Iraqi National Clubs First Division League was the 19th season of the competition since its foundation in 1974. The league title was won by Al-Talaba for the fourth time in their history. The league was 69 rounds long (totalling 828 matches), the most rounds in any season in the competition's history, with the Iraq Football Association (IFA) deciding that no player could play more than 46 matches, although they later allowed a maximum of three players per team to play more than 46 games. Players that had been selected for the Iraq national team were released for international duty by their clubs after round 24, after which they did not participate in any more league matches.

After 46 rounds, the IFA decided to remove the four lowest-placed teams from Baghdad along with the lowest-placed team from outside Baghdad, and replaced them with five new teams to play the remaining 23 games in their place, with each new team adopting the record of the club they had replaced.

== Name changes ==
- Al-Tayaran renamed to Al-Khutoot.

== League table ==
Pos	Team	Pld	W	D	L	GF	GA	GD	Pts	Qualification or relegation
1	Al-Talaba (C)	69	46	18	5	130	34	+96	110	
2	Al-Zawraa	69	43	17	9	134	40	+94	103	1993–94 Asian Cup Winners' Cup (Note: Al-Zawraa qualified for the Cup Winners' Cup by winning the Iraq FA Cup.)
3	Al-Quwa Al-Jawiya	69	43	15	11	114	48	+66	101	
4	Al-Shorta	69	33	22	14	102	51	+51	88	
5	Al-Jaish	69	29	29	11	83	48	+35	87	
6	Al-Karkh	69	29	24	16	94	64	+30	82	
7	Al-Naft	69	24	29	16	83	73	+10	77	
8	Al-Sinaa	69	26	23	20	73	59	+14	75	
9	Samarra	69	24	24	21	83	81	+2	72	
10	Salahaddin	69	24	23	22	82	68	+14	71	
11	Al-Minaa	69	21	28	20	58	70	−12	70	
12	Al-Khutoot	69	23	22	24	59	62	−3	68	
13	Al-Kut	69	22	23	24	85	75	+10	67	
14	Al-Mosul	69	21	25	23	69	89	−20	67	
15	Al-Najaf	69	20	26	23	78	72	+6	66	
16	Al-Ramadi	69	21	24	24	72	79	−7	66	
17	Al-Diwaniya	69	18	27	24	62	68	−6	63	
18	Al-Umal (Note: Al-Umal replaced Al-Tijara after 46 games, adopting Al-Tijara's record at that point which was 10 wins, 18 draws, 18 losses, 39 goals scored, 55 goals conceded, 38 points.)	69	16	27	26	55	83	−28	59	
19	Al-Nasiriya (Note: Al-Nasiriya replaced Al-Amana after 46 games, adopting Al-Amana's record at that point which was 9 wins, 20 draws, 17 losses, 37 goals scored, 59 goals conceded, 38 points.)	69	17	25	27	61	94	−33	59	
20	Diyala (Note: Diyala replaced Al-Shabab after 46 games, adopting Al-Shabab's record at that point which was 4 wins, 16 draws, 26 losses, 34 goals scored, 75 goals conceded, 24 points.)	69	14	25	30	63	96	−33	53	
21	Karbala (Note: Karbala replaced Al-Salam after 46 games, adopting Al-Salam's record at that point which was 6 wins, 18 draws, 22 losses, 20 goals scored, 59 goals conceded, 30 points.)	69	11	24	34	36	88	−52	46	
22	Erbil	69	11	21	37	69	122	−53	43	
23	Kirkuk	69	7	24	38	49	114	−65	38	
24	Sulaymaniya (Note: Sulaymaniya replaced Al-Dawr Al-Ahli after 46 games, adopting Al-Dawr Al-Ahli's record at that point which was 6 wins, 9 draws, 31 losses, 37 goals scored, 97 goals conceded, 21 points.)	69	7	11	51	45	161	−116	25	Relegated to Iraqi National Second Division

Source: Ali Al-Sabti Archive
(C) Champions

== Results ==
=== Rounds 1–46 ===
Home \ Away	AMN	DAH	DIW	JSH	KKH	KHT	KUT	MIN	MSL	NFT	NJF	QWJ	RMA	SLM	SHB	SHR	SIN	TLB	TJR	ZWR	ERB	KRK	SLH	SMR
Al-Amana (Note: Al-Amana were replaced by Al-Nasiriya after 46 games, with Al-Nasiriya adopting the results obtained by Al-Amana up to that point.)		2–2	0–0	0–0	0–0	1–0	1–0	1–1	3–2	1–1	0–3	1–2	1–0	0–1	1–1	2–3	0–0	0–1	2–0	1–0	1–0	0–0	0–2	1–0
Al-Dawr Al-Ahli (Note: Al-Dawr Al-Ahli were replaced by Sulaymaniya after 46 games, with Sulaymaniya adopting the results obtained by Al-Dawr Al-Ahli up to that point.)	3–3		1–1	0–1	4–3	1–2	0–3 (Note: The Al-Dawr Al-Ahli–Al-Kut match was awarded as a 3–0 win to Al-Kut, as Al-Dawr Al-Ahli did not turn up for the game.)	1–2	4–1	5–2	0–1	0–1	0–4	0–0	1–0	0–3	0–0	0–1	0–2	0–1	2–1	1–1	0–2	0–2
Al-Diwaniya	1–1	1–0		0–0	1–0	1–1	0–0	1–0	2–0	2–2	1–1	1–2	0–0	2–1	3–0	0–0	1–1	0–1	1–1	1–1	4–1	1–1	2–1	1–1
Al-Jaish	3–0	3–2	2–1		4–2	2–0	0–0	1–1	4–1	0–0	1–1	1–0	1–1	2–1	3–0	2–1	1–1	0–0	1–0	0–1	2–1	2–0	1–0	2–0
Al-Karkh	2–1	4–0	1–0	1–0		2–1	1–0	0–1	5–0	2–2	1–0	1–1	1–1	4–0	2–0	2–1	2–0	0–4	1–1	0–0	5–2	2–2	2–1	3–0
Al-Khutoot	4–0	3–0	0–0	0–2	1–0		2–1	0–0	0–0	0–0	1–0	1–2	1–0	2–0	3–1	0–0	0–2	0–1	0–0	1–2	0–0	2–0	1–1	1–0
Al-Kut	3–0	2–0	3–0 (Note: The Al-Kut–Al-Diwaniya match originally ended as a 1–0 win for Al-Kut but was changed to a 3–0 win due to Al-Diwaniya fielding the ineligible player Mohammed Turki.)	0–2	1–2	1–2		1–0	1–0	1–0	0–0	0–0	0–2	2–0	1–1	1–0	2–2	2–2	4–2	0–1	2–0	2–0	1–1	1–1
Al-Minaa	0–0	1–1	1–0	0–1	0–0	2–1	1–0		1–1	1–1	1–1	0–0	1–0	1–0	2–0	1–0	2–2	2–0	1–1	2–1	2–1	0–0	1–0	1–0
Al-Mosul	1–4	3–2	2–1	0–1	3–2	1–0	1–1	1–1		1–1	2–0	2–1	2–1	2–0	2–0	1–1	1–2	0–0	0–0	0–0	4–1	0–0	1–1	2–0
Al-Naft	3–1	2–0	1–1	1–1	3–0	1–0	1–0	3–0	2–1		1–1	1–3	3–0	1–0	1–1	0–0	1–1	0–1	1–1	0–3	1–0	3–2	1–1	2–2
Al-Najaf	2–1	6–0	0–0	0–1	3–2	0–0	0–0	2–0	1–1	0–0		1–2	4–1	6–1	1–0	2–0	3–1	0–0	1–1	1–0	2–2	1–0	1–3	1–1
Al-Quwa Al-Jawiya	1–0	3–0	2–1	2–0	2–1	2–0	1–0	3–1	1–0	1–0	4–0		4–1	1–2	2–2	1–1	1–0	1–2	2–1	1–1	7–1	2–0	1–0	4–0
Al-Ramadi	0–0	0–0	0–1	1–1	2–1	1–2	1–1	3–0	1–1	0–3	1–1	0–1		3–0	2–0	1–0	1–0	0–0	1–1	0–5	2–0	1–1	1–0	0–2
Al-Salam (Note: Al-Salam were replaced by Karbala after 46 games, with Karbala adopting the results obtained by Al-Salam up to that point.)	1–1	0–0	2–1	0–0	1–3	0–1	0–0	1–1	0–1	1–1	1–1	0–0	0–2		1–0	0–2	0–0	0–1	0–3 (Note: The Al-Salam–Al-Tijara match was awarded as a 3–0 win for Al-Tijara after the game had originally ended in a 1–1 draw.)	1–1	0–0	2–0	0–0	0–0
Al-Shabab (Note: Al-Shabab were replaced by Diyala after 46 games, with Diyala adopting the results obtained by Al-Shabab up to that point.)	0–0	1–3	2–0	1–1	1–2	0–1	3–1	1–0	1–1	0–0	0–0	1–2	1–1	0–1		0–1	0–2	1–4	0–0	0–4	1–1	3–1	1–1	1–4
Al-Shorta	4–1	3–0	3–1	2–0	1–1	3–1	1–1	2–1	2–0	1–0	0–0	1–1	3–0	0–0	2–2		1–0	0–0	4–0	2–0	3–0	4–0	1–0	3–0
Al-Sinaa	3–1	4–1	2–1	2–1	0–1	1–1	0–0	1–0	1–0	0–0	2–1	3–1	1–1	1–0	2–1	0–1		0–1	2–1	0–2	5–2	2–0	0–0	0–0
Al-Talaba	3–1	4–0	1–0	0–0	1–0	3–0	0–0	3–1	4–0	3–1	3–1	1–1	3–2	4–0	3–0	0–0	2–0		3–1	0–0	2–0	3–0	3–0	0–1
Al-Tijara (Note: Al-Tijara were replaced by Al-Umal after 46 games, with Al-Umal adopting the results obtained by Al-Tijara up to that point.)	0–0	1–0	2–0	2–1	0–0	0–0	1–0	0–0	0–1	1–0	2–2	0–1	0–2	1–1	0–0	0–3	1–0	0–1		0–2	1–2	3–2	1–1	2–1
Al-Zawraa	3–0	2–0	3–0	1–0	1–1	2–0	2–1	0–1	4–0	4–0	4–1	0–1	2–1	5–0	2–2	2–0	2–1	1–1	4–2		3–2	4–0	1–0	5–2
Erbil	2–2	2–1	1–0	1–3	1–1	0–0	3–4	2–1	1–1	2–2	2–1	1–2	2–1	1–0	4–3	1–1	1–1	2–2	3–1	0–2		4–1	0–0	0–1
Kirkuk	1–1	4–1	0–0	1–1	1–2	1–1	0–0	1–1	0–0	0–1	0–1	1–0	3–1	0–0	1–0	0–2	0–3	1–0	1–1	0–2	1–1		0–1	0–0
Salahaddin	0–0	3–0	1–2	0–0	0–0	1–1	0–0	0–0	3–1	2–3	2–1	1–0	3–0	0–0	2–0	1–1	2–0	2–2	2–1	0–1	2–2	4–1		3–2
Samarra	0–0	6–1	1–0	1–1	1–2	2–0	6–0	0–0	4–1	1–1	1–0	0–4	3–2	2–1	3–1	2–0	1–1	1–0	1–0	0–0	0–0	3–2	1–1	

Source: Ali Al-Sabti Archive
Legend: Blue = home team win; Yellow = draw; Red = away team win.

=== Rounds 47–69 ===
Home \ Away	DIW	JSH	KKH	KHT	KUT	MIN	MSL	NFT	NJF	NAS	QWJ	RMA	SHR	SIN	TLB	UML	ZWR	DYL	ERB	KRB	KRK	SLH	SMR	SUL
Al-Diwaniya		1–0	0–0		3–1				1–0	0–0			2–0	0–2	0–0			1–1	2–2	1–0	1–0		2–0	4–1
Al-Jaish			1–0	2–2	2–2	1–1	0–0		1–1		2–0	2–1		0–0		2–0		0–0	1–0	0–0	1–1			5–0
Al-Karkh				1–0	3–1	1–1	1–1	2–0	1–1	0–0				2–1		0–0		2–0	2–1	1–1	0–0	2–0	0–0	3–0 (Note: Sulaymaniya withdrew from their matches in Rounds 16–22, with their opponents (Al-Ramadi, Al-Shorta, Diyala, Al-Nasiriya, Al-Sinaa, Al-Naft and Al-Karkh) all being awarded 3–0 wins.)
Al-Khutoot	2–0				0–0	2–0										3–0		1–1	1–0	1–0			2–1	
Al-Kut						1–1	2–1	2–2		4–0				3–0		5–0			4–2	1–0	4–0	2–1		2–0
Al-Minaa	0–0						3–1		1–0			1–1				1–1	1–3		0–0	1–0	1–0	4–3		1–0
Al-Mosul	3–2			1–0				1–0		2–1	0–0	3–1					0–0	2–2	0–0	1–1	1–0		1–0	1–0
Al-Naft	2–1	1–1		1–1		1–0				3–1			1–0			3–0	2–1	1–1	1–0	1–1	2–0		1–0	3–0
Al-Najaf				1–0	2–1		1–0	3–2		4–1			1–1							0–0	0–0			5–1
Al-Nasiriya		2–1		1–0		1–0					2–1		1–1			1–0			2–0	2–1	1–1			3–0
Al-Quwa Al-Jawiya	2–1		1–0	2–0	1–0	2–0		1–1	2–0			2–0	2–1	2–0			1–1		1–0	3–0	2–0	1–2		7–0
Al-Ramadi	1–1		1–0	0–0	3–1			1–1	0–0	2–1				0–0	1–1	1–0	0–0		2–0	1–0	3–2			3–0
Al-Shorta		1–0	2–2	3–0	2–0	3–2	1–0					2–2					1–0	2–0	1–1	3–0	4–2	0–1	1–1	3–0
Al-Sinaa				0–0		0–0	3–1	1–0	1–0	0–0			1–0			1–1			1–0	0–0	3–1	3–1		3–0
Al-Talaba		3–0	1–1	0–1	4–2	7–0	3–0	4–0	3–0	1–0	3–1		2–1	3–1		2–0		1–0	2–0	2–0	4–0	1–0		3–1
Al-Umal	1–0						1–1		1–0		1–1		2–2					0–0	1–0			1–0		
Al-Zawraa	1–1	1–1	1–0	5–0	2–1				1–0	7–1				1–0	1–1	1–1		2–1	4–0	3–0	3–0		5–0	3–0 (Note: The Al-Zawraa–Sulaymaniya match originally ended in a 2–1 win for Sulaymaniya but was changed to a 3–0 win for Al-Zawraa due to Sulaymaniya fielding a player who avoided military service.)
Diyala					3–2	2–1			2–0	2–1	1–1	2–1		1–0					2–0	2–1				3–0
Erbil									3–2															
Karbala																2–1			1–0		3–2	2–1		2–0
Kirkuk				0–3 (Note: The Kirkuk–Al-Khutoot match was awarded as a 3–0 win to Al-Khutoot after the game had originally ended in a 1–0 win for Kirkuk.)												1–2		2–2	2–1				1–1	2–1
Salahaddin	2–0	1–1		0–0			2–2	2–0	1–0	3–2		0–1					2–1	0–1	3–1		2–1			2–0
Samarra		0–3 (Note: The Samarra–Al-Jaish match originally ended in a 2–1 win for Samarra but was changed to a 3–0 win for Al-Jaish due to Samarra violating the tournament rules.)			0–0	1–1			1–1	2–0	1–1	0–0		1–0	2–5	1–2		0–0	3–1	2–1		3–2		3–0
Sulaymaniya				3–2												0–0			1–1					

Source: Ali Al-Sabti Archive
Legend: Blue = home team win; Yellow = draw; Red = away team win.

== Season statistics ==
=== Top scorers ===
Pos	Scorer	Goals	Team
1	Karim Saddam	33	Al-Zawraa
2	Adnan Hamad	31	Samarra
3	Ahmed Radhi	25	Al-Zawraa
4	Natiq Hashim	24	Al-Quwa Al-Jawiya

=== Hat-tricks ===
Player	For	Against	Result	Date
(Iraq) Adnan Hamad	Samarra	Al-Dawr Al-Ahli	6–1	8 October 1992
(Iraq) Mahdi Kadhim	Al-Talaba	Al-Dawr Al-Ahli	4–0	12 October 1992
(Iraq) Ali Abdul-Kadhim^{4}	Al-Karkh	Erbil	5–1	15 October 1992
(Iraq) Ahmed Radhi	Al-Zawraa	Al-Salam	5–0	29 October 1992
(Iraq) Younis Abid Ali	Al-Shorta	Samarra	3–0	12 November 1992
(Iraq) Ali Hashim	Al-Najaf	Al-Ramadi	4–1	7 December 1992
(Iraq) Akram Emmanuel^{4}	Al-Quwa Al-Jawiya	Erbil	7–1	10 December 1992
(Iraq) Karim Saddam	Al-Zawraa	Samarra	5–2	14 December 1992
(Iraq) Muayad Judi	Al-Amana	Al-Mosul	3–2	14 December 1992
(Iraq) Saad Qais	Al-Karkh	Al-Salam	4–0	17 December 1992
(Iraq) Tariq Abdul-Rahman	Erbil	Al-Shabab	4–3	28 December 1992
(Iraq) Ali Hashim^{4}	Al-Najaf	Al-Salam	6–1	4 February 1993
(Iraq) Younis Abid Ali	Al-Shorta	Kirkuk	4–0	15 February 1993
(Iraq) Majeed Abdul-Ridha	Al-Talaba	Al-Shabab	4–1	15 February 1993
(Iraq) Mustafa Mohammed	Al-Dawr Al-Ahli	Al-Karkh	4–3	11 March 1993
(Iraq) Younis Abid Ali	Al-Shorta	Erbil	3–0	15 March 1993
(Iraq) Shakir Mohammed Sabbar	Al-Zawraa	Al-Nasiriya	7–1	19 April 1993
(Iraq) Bassam Raouf	Al-Quwa Al-Jawiya	Sulaymaniya	7–0	13 May 1993
(Iraq) Waleed Dhahid	Al-Quwa Al-Jawiya	Sulaymaniya	7–0	13 May 1993
(Iraq) Karim Saddam	Al-Zawraa	Erbil	4–0	27 May 1993
(Iraq) Mohamed Jassim Mahdi	Al-Zawraa	Samarra	5–0	6 June 1993
(Iraq) Rahim Saeed	Al-Kut	Al-Umal	5–0	6 June 1993
(Iraq) Ahmed Khalaf	Al-Talaba	Samarra	5–2	10 June 1993
(Iraq) Ali Hashim	Al-Najaf	Al-Nasiriya	4–1	10 June 1993

Notes

^{4} Player scored 4 goals
