= 1993–94 Iraqi National League =

Iraqi National League
- Season: 1993–94
- Champions: Al-Zawraa (5th title)
- Relegated: Al-Shabab; Al-Khutoot
- 1995 Asian Club Championship: Al-Zawraa
- 1995 Asian Cup Winners' Cup: Al-Talaba
- Top goalscorer: Younis Abid Ali (36 goals)

The 1993–94 Iraqi National Clubs First Division League was the 20th season of the competition since its foundation in 1974. The league title was won by Al-Zawraa for the fifth time in their history, and they also won the Iraq FA Cup to secure the double. The top scorer, Younis Abid Ali, set a record for the most goals scored in one league season in Iraq (36) which still stands today.

Al-Zawraa lost only one match out of 50, and were unbeaten for their last 38 matches consecutively. They went one more game unbeaten at the start of the 1994–95 season, completing a record 39-match unbeaten streak in the league; this record was equalled by Al-Shorta in 2019.

== League table ==
Pos	Team	Pld	W	D	L	GF	GA	GD	Pts	Qualification or relegation
1	Al-Zawraa (C)	50	36	13	1	93	20	+73	85	1995 Asian Club Championship
2	Al-Quwa Al-Jawiya	50	33	11	6	91	28	+63	77	
3	Al-Talaba	50	30	15	5	88	42	+46	75	1995 Asian Cup Winners' Cup (Note: Al-Talaba qualified for the Cup Winners' Cup as runners-up of the Iraq FA Cup, won by Al-Zawraa.)
4	Al-Najaf	50	26	20	4	83	26	+57	72	
5	Al-Shorta	50	30	11	9	87	33	+54	71	
6	Al-Naft	50	24	13	13	78	45	+33	61	
7	Salahaddin	50	19	18	13	57	49	+8	56	
8	Al-Jaish	50	20	15	15	67	44	+23	55	
9	Al-Ramadi	50	18	17	15	69	54	+15	53	
10	Al-Kut	50	22	9	19	70	62	+8	53	
11	Al-Diwaniya	50	17	17	16	50	60	−10	51	
12	Al-Sinaa	50	14	21	15	55	64	−9	49	
13	Al-Nasiriya	50	18	12	20	66	83	−17	48	
14	Al-Karkh	50	13	21	16	63	66	−3	47	
15	Diyala	50	17	13	20	56	65	−9	47	
16	Al-Mosul	50	14	18	18	41	55	−14	46	
17	Al-Minaa	50	12	21	17	42	58	−16	45	
18	Samarra	50	14	15	21	50	64	−14	43	
19	Karbala	50	10	21	19	44	65	−21	41	
20	Al-Umal	50	10	18	22	48	71	−23	38	
21	Al-Amara	50	10	16	24	45	70	−25	36	
22	Erbil	50	9	17	24	51	88	−37	35	
23	Al-Shabab (Note: The two lowest-placed teams from Baghdad (Al-Shabab and Al-Khutoot) were relegated to ensure that the other provinces in the league would continue to be represented by at least one club for the next season.) (R)	50	10	10	30	49	87	−38	30	Relegation to the Iraqi National Second Division
24	Kirkuk	50	7	16	27	44	101	−57	30	
25	Babil (Note: Originally, the Iraq U19 team participated in the league. Their record was 25 games, 8 wins, 8 draws, 9 losses, 33 goals scored, 29 goals conceded and 24 points. At the halfway stage of the season, they were replaced by Babil, and Babil adopted the U19 team's record at that point.)	50	9	10	31	44	85	−41	28	
26	Al-Khutoot (R)	50	6	16	28	28	74	−46	28	Relegation to the Iraqi National Second Division

Source: Ali Al-Sabti Archive
(C) Champions; (R) Relegated

== Results ==
Home \ Away	AMR	DIW	JSH	KAR	KHT	KUT	MIN	MSL	NFT	NJF	NAS	QWJ	RAM	SHB	SHR	SIN	TLB	UML	ZWR	BBL	DIY	ERB	KRB	KIR	SAL	SMR
Al-Amara		2–1	0–2	0–0	1–0	0–2	2–2	2–0	0–0	0–2	1–4	1–1	2–1	0–2	0–2	0–0	2–2	0–0	0–2	4–0	1–1	1–1	3–0	2–1	0–2	0–1
Al-Diwaniya	1–0		0–0	1–0	0–0	1–0	1–1	0–0	3–1	2–2	1–1	0–2	0–0	3–2	1–0	0–1	0–0	2–2	0–2	1–2 (Note: This match was played by the Iraq U19 team rather than Babil.)	3–0	2–1	2–0	2–1	1–0	1–1
Al-Jaish	2–0	3–0		0–0	0–0	0–1	1–0	3–1	1–0	0–1	2–0	0–2	1–0	1–0	1–2	1–1	0–1	5–1	0–3	1–1	3–2	0–1	0–0	6–0	0–0	0–1
Al-Karkh	1–0	2–2	2–4		0–0	3–1	1–1	2–2	2–2	1–3	2–0	1–3	1–0	4–2	0–2	1–1	2–2	5–2	0–2	1–0	5–3	3–1	3–0	1–1	0–1	3–1
Al-Khutoot	0–1	2–1	1–1	0–0		2–4	1–1	1–1	0–1	0–3	0–2	0–5	0–2	0–0	0–2	1–3	0–2	0–0	0–1	0–0	0–3	2–3	0–0	1–0	0–0	3–0
Al-Kut	2–1	2–0	2–1	3–2	4–0		3–0	1–0	1–2	1–2	1–2	1–0	4–2	2–1	2–0	2–1	1–2	2–2	0–1	4–2	0–0	1–1	2–3	3–1	1–0	3–0
Al-Minaa	1–1	2–1	1–1	1–1	2–1	1–0		0–1	1–0	0–0	1–1	0–0	0–0	0–0	0–1	2–0	1–1	1–0	0–0	2–0	2–0	2–1	1–1	2–0	1–5	2–2
Al-Mosul	3–1	0–0	1–1	1–1	0–1	1–0	0–0		1–0	0–0	2–1	1–2	1–1	0–2	0–1	2–1	0–0	0–0	1–1	1–0	2–1	0–0	1–0	1–0	1–1	2–1
Al-Naft	1–0	5–0	0–1	0–1	3–0	2–0	5–1	2–1		2–3	1–1	0–2	3–1	4–1	1–1	2–3	0–1	2–0	1–1	2–1	3–0	1–2	1–1	3–0	2–1	5–3
Al-Najaf	0–0	0–0	1–0	1–1	1–0	3–0	4–1	2–0	0–0		3–2	2–0	1–1	5–1	0–0	0–0	1–2	1–1	0–1	0–0	2–0	4–0	4–0	7–0	3–2	3–0
Al-Nasiriya	2–2	1–1	1–3	3–2	2–0	1–2	2–1	2–1	4–2	2–1		0–3	0–1	2–1	0–4	2–1	2–2	1–1	1–1	1–0	1–1	1–1	1–2	2–1	1–0	3–0
Al-Quwa Al-Jawiya	4–0	3–0	1–0	2–0	2–1	2–1	3–0	3–0	1–1	0–0	2–0		0–0	2–0	1–4	3–0	1–2	3–0	0–1	2–1	1–1	4–0	1–1	5–1	0–0	5–1
Al-Ramadi	1–0	2–3	1–3	1–1	2–0	0–0	1–1	2–0	1–2	0–0	1–0	1–2		3–0 (Note: The Al-Ramadi–Al-Shabab match was awarded as a 3–0 win to Al-Ramadi after the game had originally ended in a 3–1 win for the same side.)	1–0	4–0	1–2	1–1	2–3	2–0	2–0	1–1	1–1	6–3	1–1	1–0
Al-Shabab	0–2	1–2	1–1	2–2	1–1	1–2	0–2	1–2	0–1	0–0	1–0	0–3 (Note: The Al-Shabab–Al-Quwa Al-Jawiya match was awarded as a 3–0 win to Al-Quwa Al-Jawiya after the game had originally ended in a 2–0 win for the same side.)	4–2		2–1	0–1	1–1	1–0	0–3	2–1	1–2	1–2	2–1	2–2	1–4	1–2
Al-Shorta	1–0	2–3	0–0	3–0	2–0	2–2	2–0	3–1	0–0	2–0	4–0	1–1	3–1	2–0		1–1	2–3	0–0	0–2	3–0	2–0	4–1	5–0	3–0	1–0	2–0
Al-Sinaa	3–3	1–1	0–0	1–1	0–0	1–1	1–0	0–0	0–3	0–0	3–0	1–3	2–1	5–1	0–4		0–0	0–3	0–4	2–1	1–3	1–1	1–1	0–0	0–0	2–0
Al-Talaba	4–1	3–1	3–2	2–0	2–1	0–0	2–0	3–0	1–0	1–3	8–2	1–1	2–0	2–0	0–0	1–0		4–0	0–1	0–1	2–1	2–0	3–0	3–1	1–1	3–1
Al-Umal	1–1	1–2	0–1	3–0	0–0	3–0	3–1	3–1	1–4	0–1	0–0	0–2	0–0	0–1	3–2	0–1	2–4		0–4	2–0	1–2	2–2	1–1	2–1	1–2	1–1
Al-Zawraa	1–0	1–0	1–0	2–1	3–0	3–1	1–0	3–0	1–1	1–1	1–0	0–0	0–3	3–1	1–0	3–1	4–0	2–2		2–1	0–0	4–1	1–0	6–0	7–0	0–0
Babil	3–0	0–0	0–4	0–2	3–2	0–1	0–0	2–3	0–2	0–4	2–4	0–1	2–2	2–1	0–1	2–2	0–1	1–0	0–2		1–2	3–0	2–2	4–0	0–0	2–1
Diyala	0–0	1–2	1–0	2–1	1–0	3–1	1–1	1–0	1–1	0–0	1–2	0–1	2–3	0–3	0–2	3–1	1–2	2–1	0–1	2–1		3–2	2–0	2–0	1–1	1–0
Erbil	4–3	0–1	3–3	0–0	0–1	2–1	1–2	0–3	0–1	1–3	2–3	0–1	0–4	1–1	1–1	1–1	0–0	0–1	0–0	5–1	0–0		2–1	1–1	1–1	0–1
Karbala	2–1	0–0	1–2	0–0	0–1	0–0	0–0	1–1	0–2	0–2	1–1	0–1	0–0	1–1	2–3	0–1	2–1	1–0	1–1	1–1	2–0	3–2		4–1	0–1	1–1
Kirkuk	3–2	3–1	1–4	0–0	2–2	1–1	2–1	1–1	0–0	0–3	2–1	0–1	1–2	1–0	1–1	1–1	1–3	0–1	1–2	2–0	2–2	1–2	1–1		1–0	0–0
Salahaddin	1–1	1–0	2–0	2–1	4–2	2–0	1–0	0–0	0–1	0–0	2–1	2–0	1–1	3–2	0–1	1–6	1–1	0–0	0–3	2–0	1–0	5–0	1–3	1–1		0–0
Samarra	0–1	3–0	2–2	0–0	3–1	2–1	2–0	1–0	0–0	1–1	5–0	1–3	0–2	1–0	1–2	0–2	0–0	3–0	0–0	4–1	1–1	2–0	0–2	0–0	0–1	

Source: Ali Al-Sabti Archive
Legend: Blue = home team win; Yellow = draw; Red = away team win.

== Season statistics ==
=== Top scorers ===
Pos	Scorer	Goals	Team
1	Younis Abid Ali	36	Al-Shorta
2	Ali Hashim	34	Al-Najaf
3	Maad Ibrahim	24	Al-Naft
4	Hussein Mashhadi	23	Al-Kut
4	Akram Emmanuel	23	Al-Quwa Al-Jawiya

=== Hat-tricks ===
Player	For	Against	Result	Date
(Iraq) Younis Abid Ali	Al-Shorta	Al-Quwa Al-Jawiya	4–1	1 October 1993
(Iraq) Abdul-Aziz Abdul-Nabi	Al-Nasiriya	Iraq U19	4–2	1 October 1993
(Iraq) Ali Raja	Salahaddin	Al-Minaa	5–1	8 October 1993
(Iraq) Jafar Abdul-Hussein	Al-Quwa Al-Jawiya	Al-Khutoot	5–0	15 October 1993
(Iraq) Mohamed Jassim Mahdi	Al-Zawraa	Al-Sinaa	4–0	10 November 1993
(Iraq) Ziyad Tariq	Iraq U19	Kirkuk	4–0	22 November 1993
(Iraq) Ali Hashim	Al-Najaf	Kirkuk	7–0	23 December 1993
(Iraq) Hussein Abdullah	Al-Sinaa	Salahaddin	6–1	23 December 1993
(Iraq) Waleed Dhahid	Al-Quwa Al-Jawiya	Al-Amara	4–0	27 December 1993
(Iraq) Safaa Adnan^{4}	Al-Jaish	Kirkuk	6–0	30 December 1993
(Iraq) Mohanad Mahdi	Al-Kut	Al-Ramadi	4–2	27 January 1994
(Iraq) Mohammed Toma	Al-Amara	Karbala	3–0	7 February 1994
(Iraq) Younis Abed Ali	Al-Shorta	Karbala	5–0	21 February 1994
(Iraq) Mohammed Mohammed Ameen^{4}	Erbil	Babil	5–1	28 February 1994
(Iraq) Alaa Abdul-Jabbar^{4}	Al-Shorta	Al-Sinaa	4–0	3 March 1994
(Iraq) Maad Ibrahim	Al-Naft	Al-Umal	4–1	7 March 1994
(Iraq) Mahmoud Majeed	Al-Jaish	Al-Mosul	3–1	21 March 1994
(Iraq) Waleed Dhahid	Al-Quwa Al-Jawiya	Kirkuk	5–1	24 March 1994
(Iraq) Rahim Saeed	Al-Kut	Al-Khutoot	4–0	24 March 1994
(Iraq) Mohammed Toma	Al-Amara	Babil	4–0	24 March 1994
(Iraq) Hussam Fawzi	Al-Zawraa	Kirkuk	6–0	4 April 1994
(Iraq) Talib Abed Awda	Karbala	Erbil	3–2	11 April 1994
(Iraq) Haidar Nafea	Diyala	Al-Karkh	3–5	14 April 1994
(Iraq) Mahmoud Majeed	Al-Jaish	Kirkuk	4–1	14 April 1994
(Iraq) Wali Kareem^{4}	Al-Talaba	Al-Nasiriya	8–2	18 April 1994

Notes

^{4} Player scored 4 goals
