= 1991–92 Iraqi National League =

Iraqi National League
- Season: 1991–92
- Champions: Al-Quwa Al-Jawiya (3rd title)
- Relegated: Al-Sulaikh
- Top goalscorer: Ahmed Radhi (34 goals)

The 1991–92 Iraqi National Clubs First Division League was the 18th season of the competition since its foundation in 1974. The competition started on 3 October 1991 and ended on 26 June 1992, with Al-Quwa Al-Jawiya winning their third title.

Al-Quwa Al-Jawiya clinched the title on the final day of the season with a 1–0 win against Al-Zawraa, which was controversial due to Al-Zawraa having a goal ruled out for offside that would have won them the league if it was counted. Al-Quwa Al-Jawiya also won the Iraq FA Cup in this season to secure their first ever national double. Al-Khutoot Al-Jawiya (known as Al-Tayaran at the time) made their debut in the top division.

== League table ==
| Pos | Team | Pld | W | D | L | GF | GA | GD | Pts | Qualification or relegation |
|---|---|---|---|---|---|---|---|---|---|---|
| 1 | Al-Quwa Al-Jawiya | 38 | 27 | 9 | 2 | 56 | 17 | +39 | 63 | League Champions and FA Cup Winners |
| 2 | Al-Zawraa | 38 | 27 | 7 | 4 | 87 | 24 | +63 | 61 | |
| 3 | Al-Karkh | 38 | 26 | 8 | 4 | 70 | 29 | +41 | 60 | |
| 4 | Al-Talaba | 38 | 24 | 7 | 7 | 66 | 29 | +37 | 55 | |
| 5 | Al-Shorta | 38 | 17 | 12 | 9 | 33 | 21 | +12 | 46 | |
| 6 | Al-Najaf | 38 | 13 | 14 | 11 | 33 | 27 | +6 | 40 | |
| 7 | Al-Tayaran | 38 | 11 | 18 | 9 | 32 | 31 | +1 | 40 | |
| 8 | Al-Naft | 38 | 14 | 11 | 13 | 44 | 34 | +10 | 39 | |
| 9 | Al-Minaa | 38 | 12 | 13 | 13 | 39 | 42 | −3 | 37 | |
| 10 | Al-Amana | 38 | 10 | 14 | 14 | 26 | 34 | −8 | 34 | |
| 11 | Al-Mosul | 38 | 10 | 14 | 14 | 28 | 39 | −11 | 34 | |
| 12 | Al-Salam | 38 | 10 | 13 | 15 | 32 | 34 | −2 | 33 | |
| 13 | Salahaddin | 38 | 8 | 17 | 13 | 34 | 42 | −8 | 33 | |
| 14 | Al-Shabab | 38 | 6 | 21 | 11 | 28 | 39 | −11 | 33 | |
| 15 | Samarra | 38 | 9 | 13 | 16 | 27 | 47 | −20 | 31 | |
| 16 | Al-Sinaa | 38 | 9 | 13 | 16 | 26 | 48 | −22 | 31 | |
| 17 | Al-Kut | 38 | 6 | 15 | 17 | 22 | 48 | −26 | 27 | |
| 18 | Al-Tijara | 38 | 7 | 11 | 20 | 26 | 44 | −18 | 25 | Into play-offs (Note: The relegation play-offs saw Al-Tijara, Al-Sulaikh, Erbil and Al-Bahri compete for two places in the top division. Al-Tijara and Erbil retained their place in the top division through the play-offs, while Al-Sulaikh were relegated and Al-Bahri remained in the Iraqi National Second Division.) |
| 19 | Al-Sulaikh | 38 | 3 | 13 | 22 | 12 | 51 | −39 | 19 | Relegated via play-offs |
| 20 | Erbil | 38 | 6 | 7 | 25 | 30 | 71 | −41 | 19 | Into play-offs |

Source: Ali Al-Sabti Archive

== Results ==
| Home \ Away | AMN | KAR | KUT | MIN | MSL | NFT | NJF | QWJ | SLM | SHB | SHR | SIN | SUL | TLB | TAY | TIJ | ZWR | ERB | SAL | SMR |
|---|---|---|---|---|---|---|---|---|---|---|---|---|---|---|---|---|---|---|---|---|
| Al-Amana | | 0–3 | 3–0 | 0–0 | 0–2 | 3–2 | 0–0 | 1–2 | 1–0 | 1–1 | 0–0 | 1–1 | 0–0 | 0–0 | 0–0 | 1–0 | 1–0 | 3–1 | 2–1 | 0–0 |
| Al-Karkh | 1–0 | | 2–1 | 3–0 | 2–0 | 3–1 | 1–0 | 2–3 | 0–1 | 1–1 | 2–0 | 0–0 | 3–0 | 1–2 | 1–0 | 1–0 | 2–2 | 3–1 | 2–1 | 3–1 |
| Al-Kut | 0–0 | 1–1 | | 0–1 | 1–0 | 2–1 | 1–2 | 0–0 | 0–2 | 2–2 | 1–0 | 0–0 | 1–0 | 0–0 | 0–0 | 1–3 | 0–1 | 2–1 | 1–2 | 0–0 |
| Al-Minaa | 2–0 | 2–3 | 1–0 | | 3–0 | 0–3 | 0–0 | 2–2 | 1–0 | 3–1 | 2–2 | 0–0 | 0–0 | 2–0 | 0–1 | 2–2 | 0–2 | 1–1 | 0–0 | 3–0 |
| Al-Mosul | 2–0 | 1–2 | 0–0 | 4–1 | | 1–0 | 1–0 | 0–1 | 0–0 | 1–1 | 1–0 | 0–0 | 0–0 | 0–3 | 1–1 | 3–2 | 1–4 | 1–0 | 1–1 | 1–1 |
| Al-Naft | 3–1 | 0–0 | 3–0 | 2–1 | 0–0 | | 2–0 | 1–2 | 2–1 | 4–2 | 0–0 | 2–0 | 1–0 | 1–2 | 1–2 | 1–0 | 1–1 | 0–0 | 0–0 | 0–1 |
| Al-Najaf | 0–0 | 1–0 | 2–2 | 0–0 | 3–0 | 0–0 | | 0–2 | 1–0 | 2–0 | 0–0 | 4–2 | 4–0 | 0–1 | 0–0 | 1–1 | 1–4 | 2–0 | 0–0 | 0–0 |
| Al-Quwa Al-Jawiya | 1–0 | 0–1 | 3–1 | 1–1 | 2–0 | 2–1 | 0–0 | | 3–2 | 0–0 | 1–0 | 2–0 | 1–0 | 2–0 | 1–1 | 1–0 | 0–0 | 3–1 | 1–0 | 3–0 |
| Al-Salam | 0–0 | 0–2 | 0–0 | 2–1 | 3–1 | 0–2 | 0–1 | 1–2 | | 0–0 | 0–1 | 4–0 | 1–0 | 0–2 | 1–2 | 3–2 | 2–1 | 1–1 | 2–2 | 1–1 |
| Al-Shabab | 0–0 | 1–1 | 2–0 | 1–1 | 0–0 | 0–0 | 0–0 | 0–1 | 1–1 | | 0–0 | 0–1 | 0–0 | 1–2 | 1–0 | 0–0 | 0–3 | 1–2 | 1–3 | 3–3 |
| Al-Shorta | 1–0 | 2–3 | 1–0 | 1–0 | 1–1 | 3–0 | 1–0 | 0–0 | 1–0 | 1–1 | | 4–0 | 1–0 | 1–1 | 0–0 | 2–0 | 0–1 | 2–0 | 1–0 | 2–0 |
| Al-Sinaa | 2–1 | 0–1 | 1–1 | 1–0 | 1–1 | 0–0 | 0–1 | 0–3 | 0–2 | 0–1 | 0–1 | | 1–1 | 0–1 | 1–2 | 0–0 | 1–4 | 3–0 | 0–0 | 2–0 |
| Al-Sulaikh | 0–2 | 0–4 | 0–0 | 1–2 | 0–0 | 1–0 | 0–0 | 0–1 | 0–0 | 1–2 | 2–0 | 1–2 | | 1–3 | 0–0 | 0–1 | 0–2 | 0–2 | 1–0 | 1–1 |
| Al-Talaba | 2–0 | 0–1 | 2–0 | 3–0 | 2–0 | 0–0 | 2–0 | 0–2 | 2–1 | 1–0 | 0–1 | 5–0 | 0–0 | | 1–0 | 3–2 | 2–3 | 4–1 | 3–0 | 1–0 |
| Al-Tayaran | 0–0 | 1–3 | 0–0 | 0–0 | 2–0 | 0–4 | 2–0 | 0–2 | 0–0 | 1–1 | 0–0 | 1–2 | 2–1 | 1–1 | | 0–0 | 0–0 | 5–1 | 2–1 | 2–2 |
| Al-Tijara | 0–1 | 1–4 | 1–0 | 0–1 | 0–0 | 2–1 | 1–2 | 1–1 | 0–0 | 1–2 | 0–1 | 0–0 | 2–0 | 0–2 | 0–1 | | 0–2 | 0–1 | 1–2 | 1–1 |
| Al-Zawraa | 2–0 | 2–3 | 6–0 | 5–2 | 1–0 | 1–1 | 2–0 | 0–1 | 1–0 | 2–0 | 3–0 | 3–1 | 8–0 | 3–2 | 3–1 | 3–0 | | 2–1 | 0–0 | 4–0 |
| Erbil | 1–3 | 2–2 | 2–2 | 0–3 | 0–3 | 0–1 | 0–4 | 0–3 | 0–0 | 0–1 | 0–1 | 0–1 | 0–0 | 1–3 | 2–1 | 0–1 | 0–2 | | 2–4 | 3–1 |
| Salahaddin | 2–1 | 1–1 | 0–2 | 0–1 | 0–1 | 2–3 | 2–1 | 1–0 | 0–0 | 0–0 | 1–1 | 0–0 | 2–0 | 3–3 | 0–0 | 0–0 | 1–4 | 1–3 | | 0–0 |
| Samarra | 2–0 | 0–2 | 3–0 | 1–0 | 1–0 | 1–0 | 0–1 | 0–1 | 0–1 | 0–0 | 1–0 | 1–3 | 2–1 | 1–5 | 0–1 | 0–1 | 0–0 | 1–0 | 1–1 | |

Source: Ali Al-Sabti Archive
Legend: Blue = home team win; Yellow = draw; Red = away team win.

== Season statistics ==
=== Top scorers ===
| Pos | Scorer | Goals | Team |
|---|---|---|---|
| 1 | Ahmed Radhi | 34 | Al-Zawraa |
| 2 | Karim Saddam | 22 | Al-Zawraa |
| 3 | Saad Qais | 20 | Al-Karkh |
| 4 | Alaa Kadhim | 17 | Al-Talaba |
| 4 | Akram Emmanuel | 17 | Al-Quwa Al-Jawiya |

=== Hat-tricks ===
| Player | For | Against | Result | Date |
|---|---|---|---|---|
| (Iraq) Ahmed Radhi | Al-Zawraa | Al-Talaba | 3–2 | 3 October 1991 |
| (Iraq) Talib Farih | Al-Sinaa | Samarra | 3–1 | 1 November 1991 |
| (Iraq) Karim Saddam | Al-Zawraa | Al-Kut | 6–0 | 1 November 1991 |
| (Iraq) Mohammed Toma | Al-Salam | Al-Sinaa | 4–0 | 7 November 1991 |
| (Iraq) Talib Farih | Al-Sinaa | Erbil | 3–0 | 5 December 1991 |
| (Iraq) Rahim Hameed | Al-Tayaran | Erbil | 5–1 | 12 December 1991 |
| (Iraq) Alaa Kadhim | Al-Talaba | Samarra | 5–1 | 24 January 1992 |
| (Iraq) Ali Hashim | Al-Najaf | Erbil | 4–0 | 14 May 1992 |
| (Iraq) Ahmed Radhi | Al-Zawraa | Al-Tayaran | 3–1 | 12 June 1992 |
