= 1997–98 Iraqi Premier League =

Iraqi Premier League
- Season: 1997–98
- Champions: Al-Shorta (2nd title)
- Relegated: Al-Mosul; Al-Kut; Al-Sinaa
- 1999–2000 Asian Club Championship: Al-Shorta
- 1999–2000 Asian Cup Winners' Cup: Al-Zawraa
- Top goalscorer: Mahmoud Majeed (22 goals)

The 1997–98 Iraqi Premier League was the 24th season of the competition since its foundation in 1974. For the first time in the competition's history, there were three teams in contention for the title on the last day of the season: Al-Quwa Al-Jawiya, Al-Shorta and Al-Zawraa.

Al-Quwa Al-Jawiya were playing Al-Zawraa on the final day (22 May) at the same time as Al-Shorta played Al-Sulaikh. Al-Quwa Al-Jawiya needed a win to guarantee the title, whereas Al-Shorta needed Al-Quwa Al-Jawiya to draw or lose and needed to win their game in order to win the league. For Al-Zawraa to win the league, they needed to beat Al-Quwa Al-Jawiya and needed Al-Shorta to draw or lose their match.

Al-Quwa Al-Jawiya drew 1–1 with Al-Zawraa, while Al-Shorta were losing 2–1 against Al-Sulaikh before an 84th-minute goal and a 91st-minute penalty kick saw them win 3–2 and clinch the title. Al-Quwa Al-Jawiya players and fans thought that Al-Shorta had drawn their game and celebrated on the pitch thinking they had won the league, with manager Ayoub Odisho being interviewed on live television. Midway through the interview, the stadium announcer announced that Al-Shorta had won 3–2 and had therefore won the league, causing Odisho to stop talking and stand still with a shocked expression.

Al-Shorta set a new league record of eleven consecutive wins on their way to the title, and also scored in all 30 of their matches.

== League table ==
Pos	Team	Pld	W	D	L	GF	GA	GD	Pts	Qualification or relegation
1	Al-Shorta (C)	30	23	4	3	71	30	+41	73	1999–2000 Asian Club Championship
2	Al-Quwa Al-Jawiya	30	22	5	3	67	21	+46	71	
3	Al-Zawraa	30	21	7	2	70	22	+48	70	1999–2000 Asian Cup Winners' Cup (Note: Al-Zawraa qualified for the Cup Winners' Cup by winning the Iraq FA Cup.)
4	Al-Najaf	30	18	8	4	58	22	+36	62	
5	Al-Talaba	30	18	7	5	67	28	+39	61	
6	Al-Jaish	30	12	8	10	37	36	+1	44	
7	Al-Minaa	30	12	3	15	29	41	−12	39	
8	Al-Naft	30	9	11	10	37	34	+3	38	
9	Maysan	30	9	8	13	26	40	−14	35	
10	Diyala	30	8	10	12	38	47	−9	34	
11	Al-Sulaikh	30	8	8	14	23	36	−13	32	
12	Salahaddin	30	7	7	16	26	40	−14	28	
13	Samarra	30	6	8	16	27	55	−28	26	
14	Al-Mosul (R)	30	4	9	17	28	72	−44	21	Relegation to the Iraqi First Division League
15	Al-Kut (R)	30	3	8	19	24	65	−41	17	Relegation to the Iraqi First Division League
16	Al-Sinaa (R)	30	1	7	22	19	58	−39	10	Relegation to the Iraqi First Division League

Source: Ali Al-Sabti Archive
(C) Champions; (R) Relegated

== Results ==
Home \ Away	JSH	KUT	MIN	MSL	NFT	NJF	QWJ	SHR	SIN	SLK	TLB	ZWR	DYL	MYS	SAL	SMR
Al-Jaish		1–1	1–0	2–2	2–2	1–1	0–2	1–4	1–0	3–0	1–2	1–2	3–1	1–0	1–0	0–1
Al-Kut	0–0		1–2	3–0	0–1	0–6	0–1	0–2	3–0	0–0	1–4	0–6	2–3	1–2	2–2	2–0
Al-Minaa	0–2	1–0		4–1	2–0	0–3	0–1	3–2	3–0	1–0	2–1	0–3	2–0	2–1	2–1	1–0
Al-Mosul	0–1	2–1	2–0		0–5	1–1	0–3	1–2	1–1	1–2	2–4	0–0	2–2	1–0	0–1	2–1
Al-Naft	1–1	0–0	0–0	2–0		1–2	1–2	1–2	2–1	0–0	1–2	1–1	3–1	1–1	1–1	2–0
Al-Najaf	2–0	1–1	1–0	5–0	4–0		1–1	2–1	2–1	4–1	2–1	0–0	2–0	3–0	3–0	1–0
Al-Quwa Al-Jawiya	2–1	5–0	2–0	5–1	3–1	0–0		2–3	2–0	2–0	2–2	1–3	5–1	0–0	1–0	6–0
Al-Shorta	2–0	2–0	3–2	6–2	3–2	3–0	3–2		1–0	2–0	1–1	2–2	3–1	1–2	3–0	4–0
Al-Sinaa	1–3	1–1	0–0	3–1	1–2	0–4	0–4	0–2		1–2	1–3	2–3	1–2	0–1	1–3	1–1
Al-Sulaikh	3–1	1–1	1–0	1–0	0–1	0–1	0–2	2–3	2–0		0–1	1–2	0–0	1–0	0–0	1–1
Al-Talaba	2–2	9–1	7–0	7–1	1–0	2–1	1–2	0–1	1–1	2–0		1–0	3–0	1–1	3–1	1–0
Al-Zawraa	1–2	1–0	2–1	5–0	1–0	2–0	1–1	1–1	2–0	3–1	2–1		1–1	6–1	4–0	5–1
Diyala	2–2	3–2	3–0	1–1	0–0	2–2	0–1	1–2	1–1	1–1	1–2	1–2		2–0	2–0	3–0
Maysan	0–1	2–0	1–1	0–0	2–2	2–1	1–4	0–4	1–0	1–1	0–0	0–1	3–0		1–0	2–1
Salahaddin	1–2	2–0	1–0	1–1	1–1	0–1	1–2	1–2	3–0	1–0	0–0	2–3	0–2	2–0		0–0
Samarra	1–0	5–1	1–0	3–3	0–3	2–2	0–1	1–1	1–1	1–2	1–2	0–5	1–1	2–1	2–1	

Source: Ali Al-Sabti Archive
Legend: Blue = home team win; Yellow = draw; Red = away team win.

== Season statistics ==
=== Top scorers ===
Pos	Scorer	Goals	Team
1	Mahmoud Majeed	22	Al-Shorta
2	Alaa Kadhim	18	Al-Talaba
3	Hussam Fawzi	17	Al-Zawraa

=== Hat-tricks ===
Player	For	Against	Result	Date
(Iraq) Salman Hussein	Al-Najaf	Al-Sulaikh	4–1	30 October 1997
(Iraq) Mustafa Qasim^{4}	Samarra	Al-Kut	5–1	30 October 1997
(Iraq) Bahaa Hussein	Al-Kut	Al-Sinaa	3–0	14 November 1997
(Iraq) Hussam Fawzi	Al-Zawraa	Al-Mosul	5–0	12 December 1997
(Iraq) Ahmed Radhi	Al-Zawraa	Samarra	5–0	19 December 1997
(Iraq) Qahtan Chathir	Al-Talaba	Al-Minaa	7–0	19 December 1997
(Iraq) Ahmed Zuhair	Maysan	Diyala	3–0	19 December 1997
(Iraq) Alaa Kadhim^{6}	Al-Talaba	Al-Mosul	7–1	9 January 1998
(Iraq) Hussein Abdullah	Diyala	Samarra	3–0	16 February 1998
(Iraq) Sahib Abbas	Al-Zawraa	Salahaddin	3–2	19 March 1998
(Iraq) Sahib Abbas	Al-Zawraa	Maysan	6–1	27 March 1998
(Iraq) Qahtan Chathir^{4}	Al-Talaba	Al-Kut	9–1	17 April 1998
(Iraq) Ali Hussein Awda^{4}	Al-Najaf	Al-Kut	6–0	22 May 1998

Notes

^{4} Player scored 4 goals
^{6} Player scored 6 goals
