= Saad SC =

Iraqi football club

- Full name: Saad Sport Club
- Founded: 5 November 1989; 36 years ago
- Ground: Saad Sport Club Stadium
- Chairman: Abdul-Jabbar Saleh
- Manager: Mohammed Khalaf
- League: Iraqi Third Division League
Home colours	Away colours

Saad Sport Club (Arabic: نادي سعد الرياضي) is an Iraqi football team based in Ad-Dawr, Saladin, that plays in Iraqi Third Division League.

== History ==
=== Lower divisions ===
Saad SC was founded on 5 November 1989 and admitted to the Iraqi Third Division League (fourth-tier of Iraqi football) after the withdrawal of one of the teams in that division. Saad won the Third Division League and Second Division League titles consecutively, and in the 1991–92 season they won the Iraqi First Division League title by beating Wahid Huzairan 1–0 in the final, securing promotion to the Iraqi Premier League.

=== In Premier League ===
Saad SC team played in the Iraqi Premier League for the first time in the 1992–93 season, and in that season the club's name was changed and played under the name (Al-Dawr Al-Ahli), and the team was not good enough, and with a strange decision, the team was excluded from the league, and was replaced by Sulaymaniya after 46 games, with Sulaymaniya adopting the results obtained by Al-Dawr Al-Ahli up to that point, and eventually relegated to the Iraqi First Division League.

== Managerial history ==
- (Iraq) Nihad Ghazi
- (Iraq) Dhiaa Hussein
- (Iraq) Mohammed Khalaf

== Famous players ==
- (Iraq) Rahim Bakr

== Honours ==
- Iraqi Premier Division League (second tier)
  - Winners (1): 1991–92
- Iraqi First Division League (third tier)
  - Winners (1): 1990–91
- Iraqi Second Division League (fourth tier)
  - Winners (1): 1989–90
