= 1983–84 Iraqi National League =

Iraqi National League
- Season: 1983–84
- Champions: Al-Jaish (1st title)
- Top goalscorer: Ali Hussein Mahmoud (13 goals)

The 1983–84 Iraqi National Clubs First Division League was the 10th season of the competition since its foundation in 1974. Al-Jaish won their first national league title and remained unbeaten throughout their 24 matches.

== Name changes ==
- Al-Shorta renamed to Qiwa Al-Amn Al-Dakhili.

== League table ==
Pos	Team	Pld	W	D	L	GF	GA	GD	Pts	Qualification
1	Al-Jaish	24	15	9	0	42	18	+24	39	League Champions
2	Al-Talaba	24	14	8	2	40	19	+21	36	
3	Al-Tayaran	24	14	7	3	37	18	+19	35	
4	Al-Shabab	24	11	10	3	28	14	+14	32	
5	Al-Zawraa	24	8	10	6	21	18	+3	26	
6	Salahaddin	24	7	11	6	21	20	+1	25	
7	Al-Sinaa	24	7	8	9	17	17	0	22	FA Cup Winners
8	Qiwa Al-Amn Al-Dakhili	24	7	6	11	25	32	−7	20	
9	Wahid Huzairan	24	6	6	12	13	21	−8	18	
10	Al-Tijara	24	3	9	12	17	30	−13	15	
11	Al-Mosul	24	4	7	13	16	32	−16	15	
12	Al-Minaa	24	5	5	14	22	48	−26	15	
13	Al-Amana	24	4	6	14	23	35	−12	14	

Source: Ali Al-Sabti Archive

== Results ==
Home \ Away	AMN	JSH	MIN	MSL	SHB	SIN	TLB	TAY	TJR	ZWR	QED	SAL	WHU
Al-Amana		2–4	6–3	5–1	0–2	1–0	0–1	0–1	1–1	0–0	1–2	1–1	0–1
Al-Jaish	2–0		3–2	0–0	1–1	1–0	0–0	4–1	1–0	1–1	5–3	1–1	1–0
Al-Minaa	0–0	0–1		1–0	1–0	0–0	1–2	1–3	3–2	2–1	2–4	0–0	0–1
Al-Mosul	3–1	0–2	2–0		0–1	0–1	1–2	0–1	0–0	1–1	0–2	1–2	1–1
Al-Shabab	0–0	2–2	4–0	3–1		1–0	1–1	0–0	1–0	0–1	0–0	1–1	1–0
Al-Sinaa	0–1	1–1	3–0	0–1	1–0		1–1	1–1	0–2	0–0	1–1	1–2	0–0
Al-Talaba	1–1	2–2	6–0	3–1	1–3	3–0		0–0	1–0	1–0	2–1	4–1	1–0
Al-Tayaran	5–2	0–1	6–3	2–1	1–1	1–0	1–1		5–1	0–0	2–0	0–0	1–0
Al-Tijara	2–0	0–3	0–2	0–0	1–1	0–1	1–1	0–1		1–1	0–1	2–2	2–0
Al-Zawraa	1–0	1–3	2–0	3–0	0–0	0–0	1–2	2–1	1–1		1–0	1–1	0–1
Qiwa Al-Amn Al-Dakhili	1–0	1–2	1–1	0–0	1–2	0–4	1–2	0–1	2–0	1–2		0–2	1–0
Salahaddin	1–0	0–1	0–0	1–2	0–1	0–1	1–0	0–1	0–0	2–0	1–1		1–1
Wahid Huzairan	2–1	0–0	1–0	0–0	1–2	0–1	1–2	0–2	2–1	0–1	1–1	0–1	

Source: Ali Al-Sabti Archive
Legend: Blue = home team win; Yellow = draw; Red = away team win.

== Season statistics ==
=== Top scorers ===
Pos	Scorer	Goals	Team
1	Ali Hussein Mahmoud	13	Al-Jaish
2	Rahim Hameed	11	Al-Jaish
3	Hussein Saeed	7	Al-Talaba

=== Hat-tricks ===
Player	For	Against	Result	Date
(Iraq) Karim Allawi	Al-Amana	Al-Minaa	6–3	29 December 1983
(Iraq) Aqeel Hato	Al-Minaa	Al-Amana	3–6	29 December 1983
(Iraq) Hiyad Azhar	Al-Tayaran	Al-Minaa	6–3	12 January 1984
(Iraq) Saad Jassim	Al-Shabab	Al-Minaa	4–0	2 March 1984
(Iraq) Hassan Farhan	Al-Jaish	Al-Tijara	3–0	15 March 1984
