= Nadhim Shaker =

Iraqi footballer and coach (1958–2020)

Personal information
- Full name: Nadhim Shaker Salim
- Date of birth: 18 December 1958
- Place of birth: Baghdad, Iraq
- Date of death: 11 September 2020 (aged 61)
- Place of death: Erbil, Kurdistan Region, Iraq
- Height: 1.86 m (6 ft 1 in)
- Position: Defender

Senior career*
Years	Team	Apps	(Gls)
1976–1977	Al-Umal		
1977–1988	Al-Quwa Al-Jawiya		
1988–1991	Al-Salam		

International career
1978	Iraq U20		
1978–1986	Iraq	57	(3)

Managerial career
- 1989–1991: Al-Salam (player-manager)
- 1991–1993: Al-Sinaa
- 1993–1994: Al-Karmal
- 1994–1995: Al-Karkh
- 1996–1997: Duhok
- 1997–1998: Al-Naft
- 1998: Pires
- 1998–2000: Al-Quwa Al-Jawiya
- 2001–2002: Erbil
- 2002–2003: Al-Quwa Al-Jawiya
- 2003–2004: Ras Al Khaimah
- 2004–2005: Duhok
- 2005–2007: Erbil
- 2007: Ararat Tehran
- 2007–2008: Pires
- 2009–2010: Iraq
- 2011: Iraq U23
- 2011–2012: Zakho
- 2012: Al-Naft
- 2013: Masafi Al-Wasat
- 2014–2015: Al-Quwa Al-Jawiya
- 2017: Al-Shorta
- 2017–2018: Al-Najaf
- 2018: Al-Minaa
- 2019: Erbil
- * Club domestic league appearances and goals

Nadhim Shaker Salim (Arabic: ناظم شاكر سالم; 18 December 1958 – 11 September 2020) was an Iraqi football player and coach of the Iraq national team.

== Playing career ==
Nadhim Shaker was one of the most talented defenders in Iraqi football history. He began his playing career at Al-Amal in 1976 before moving to Al-Quwa Al-Jawiya the following year and staying with the club until 1988. He then became a player-manager for the Al-Salam club.

He played for the Iraq national team from 1978 till 1986. The defender represented Iraq at the 1979 World Military Championship and at the 1986 FIFA World Cup finals in Mexico playing against Paraguay, Belgium and the hosts, Mexico.

== Managerial career ==
On 8 December 2018, Shaker became the new coach for Erbil. He led the team in 17 games, winning five. He ended up leaving the team on 27 April 2019.

== Death ==
Shaker died on 11 September 2020, at a hospital in Erbil from COVID-19 during the COVID-19 pandemic in Iraq.

== Career statistics ==
Scores and results list Iraq's goal tally first, score column indicates score after each Shaker goal.

List of international goals scored by Nadhim Shaker
No.	Date	Venue	Opponent	Score	Result	Competition
1	19 December 1978	Rajamangala Stadium, Bangkok, Thailand	India	2–0	3–0	1978 Asian Games
2	22 August 1981	Al-Shaab Stadium, Baghdad, Iraq	Ghana	4–0	4–0	Friendly
3	17 March 1984	Royal Oman Police Stadium, Muscat, Oman	Saudi Arabia	1–0	4–0	7th Arabian Gulf Cup

== Managerial statistics ==
As of 17 May 2019

Team	Nat	From	To	Record				
Team	Nat	From	To	G	W	D	L	Win %
Iraq	(Iraq)	July 2009	November 2009	4	4	0	0	100.00
Iraq U23	(Iraq)	30 March 2011	10 August 2011	4	1	1	2	25.00
Zakho	(Iraq)	18 September 2011	29 January 2012	13	6	3	4	46.15
Al-Naft	(Iraq)	6 March 2012	8 December 2012	27	10	11	6	37.04
Masafi Al-Wasat	(Iraq)	11 May 2013	16 December 2013	23	5	5	13	21.74
Al-Quwa Al-Jawiya	(Iraq)	9 May 2014	22 February 2015	17	7	6	4	41.18
Al-Shorta	(Iraq)	29 March 2017	1 September 2017	13	9	3	1	69.23
Al-Najaf	(Iraq)	3 September 2017	18 January 2018	16	8	6	2	50.00
Al-Minaa	(Iraq)	26 January 2018	22 May 2018	16	7	6	3	43.75
Erbil	(Iraq)	8 December 2018	27 April 2019	17	5	4	8	29.41
Total				150	62	45	43	41.33
