= Bassam Raouf =

Iraqi footballer and coach

Personal information
- Full name: Bassam Raouf Hamed
- Date of birth: 7 October 1968 (age 58)
- Place of birth: Baghdad, Iraq
- Position: Midfielder

Youth career
- 1981–1982: Al-Talaba
- 1982–1985: Amanat Baghdad
- 1985–1986: Al-Rasheed

Senior career*
Years	Team	Apps	(Gls)
1986−1988	Al-Shorta		
1988–1990	Al-Naft		
1990–1993	Al-Tayaran		
1993–1994	Al-Zawraa		
1994–1995	Sportul Studențesc	0	(0)
1995–1999	Assyriska FF		

International career
1989−1993	Iraq		
- * Club domestic league appearances and goals

Bassam Raouf (Arabic: بسام رؤوف) born in 1968 is an Iraqi football coach and former player.

== Honours ==
=== Club ===
Al-Tayaran

- Iraqi Premier League: 1991–92
- Iraq FA Cup: 1991–92

Al-Zawraa

- Iraqi Premier League: 1993–94
- Iraq FA Cup: 1993–94

=== International ===
- Peace and Friendship Cup: 1989

=== Individual ===
- 1986 Best Young Footballer of League.
