= Al-Salam SC (Iraq) =

Iraqi football club

- Full name: Al-Salam Sport Club
- Founded: 1988; 38 years ago
- Ground: Al-Salam Stadium
- League: Iraqi Third Division League
Home colours	Away colours

Al-Salam Sport Club (Arabic: نادي السلام الرياضي) is an Iraqi football team based in Baghdad, that plays in Iraqi Third Division League.

== History ==
=== In Premier League ===
Al-Salam team played in the Iraqi Premier League for the first time in the 1991–92 season, and the team made a good start, and managed to defeat major teams in the league, such as: Al-Zawraa, Al-Minaa, Al-Karkh, and others, and finally finished in twelfth place, collecting 33 points. Next season, the 1992–93 season, the team was not good enough, and with a strange decision, the team was excluded from the league, and was replaced by Karbalaa after 46 games, with Karbalaa adopting the results obtained by Al-Salam up to that point, and eventually relegated to the Iraqi First Division League.

== Managerial history ==
- (Iraq) Nazar Ashraf (1989–1991)
- (Iraq) Nadhim Shaker (1992–1994)

== Famous players ==
- Nadhim Shaker
- Wamidh Munir
- Wasfi Jabbar
- Hassan Kamal
- Sadiq Mousa

== Honours ==
- Iraqi Premier Division League (second tier)
  - Runners-up (1): 1990–91
