= Delal Stadium =

Stadium In Zakho, Kurdistan Region

Delal Stadium ملعب دلال
- Interactive map of Delal Stadium ملعب دلال
- Location: Zakho, Kurdistan Region Kurdistan Iraq
- Coordinates: 37.168400°N 42.691790°E
- Owner: Kurdistan Regional Government
- Capacity: 10,000
- Surface: Grass
- Scoreboard: Yes
- Field size: 105 m × 68 m

Tenant
- Zakho FC

Delal Stadium (Arabic: ملعب دلال) (Kurdish: یاریگەها دەلال) is a multi-purpose stadium in Zakho, Kurdistan Region. It is currently used mostly for football matches and serves as secondary venue of Zakho FC.

== See also ==
- List of football stadiums in Iraq
