= Younis Abed Ali =

Iraqi footballer (born 1968)

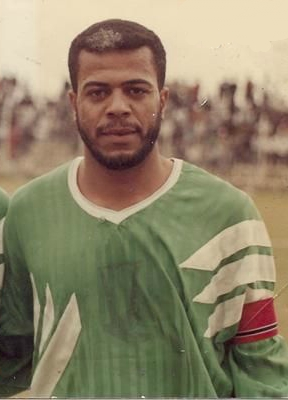

Personal information
- Full name: Younis Abed Ali Sadkhan
- Date of birth: 1 August 1968 (age 58)
- Place of birth: Al-Thawra, Baghdad, Iraq
- Position: Forward

Team information
- Current team: Al-Shorta SC (Technical Advisor)

Youth career
- 1979–1983: Al-Shorta

Senior career*
Years	Team	Apps	(Gls)
1983–1986	Al-Shorta		(3)
1986–1990	Al-Rasheed		(15)
1990–1997	Al-Shorta		(118)
1997–1998	Al-Quwa Al-Jawiya		(3)
1998–1999	Al-Shorta		(14)
1999–2000	Al-Difaa Al-Jawi		(4)

International career
1984–1985	Iraq U16	16	(0)
1985–1988	Iraq U20	22	(5)
1987–1992	Iraq U23	11	(0)
1988–1992	Iraq	27	(1)

Managerial career
- 2003–2005: Al-Shorta
- 2006–2007: Al-Samawa
- 2007–2008: Al-Naft
- 2010–2011: Al-Shorta
- 2021–: Al-Shorta (Technical Ad.)
- * Club domestic league appearances and goals

Younis Abed Ali (Arabic: يُونُس عَبْد عَلِيّ) (born 1968 in Al-Thawra, Baghdad) is an Iraqi former football forward who played for Iraq in the 1988 Summer Olympics in Seoul, 1988 Arab Nations Cup in Amman and 1989 Peace and Friendship Cup in Kuwait.

== Club career ==
In 1979 Younis began playing for Academy of Al-Shorta Club, and in 1983 moved to play for the Premier League with the first team. In the 1986–87 season, he moved to Al-Rasheed Club to achieve his most successful titles. He won three Premier League titles, two FA Cup trophies, Arab Club Championship title and runner-up title of Asian Champions League. In the 1990–91 season, he returned to his first club Al-Shorta, winning the title of top scorer in the 1993–94 season with 36 goals, a record until now. In the 1997–98 season he moved to Al-Quwa Al-Jawiya and later moved to Al-Difaa Al-Jawi to retire in 2001; during those seasons, Younis scored 157 league goals.

== International career ==
In 1984, Yunis started playing for the Iraq U16, and then played for the 1985 AFC U-16 Championship in Qatar.

He was called by coach Wathiq Naji to play in the 1988 AFC Youth Championship qualification in Maldives and then in the 1988 AFC Youth Championship in Qatar, he won the championship title with the team, and also won the top scorer title.

He was called by coach Ammo Baba to play in the 1988 Summer Olympics in Seoul, and under the leadership of the same coach, his first appearance with the national team was against Sudan in a friendly in 1987, then playing in the 1988 Arab Nations Cup in Amman, where he won the championship title with the team, he scored a goal against Jordan. He was called by coach Anwar Jassam to play in the 1989 Peace and Friendship Cup in Kuwait, where he won the championship title with the team.

== International goals ==
Iraq national football team goals
Scores and results list Iraq's goal tally first.

#	Date	Venue	Opponent	Score	Result	Competition
1.	19 July 1988	Amman International Stadium, Amman, Jordan	Jordan	2–0	3–0	1988 Arab Nations Cup

== Honors ==
=== Club ===
Al-Rasheed

- Iraqi Premier League: 1986–87, 1987–88, 1988–89
- Iraq FA Cup: 1986–87, 1987–88
- Arab Club Champions Cup: 1986
- Asian Champions League: 1988–89 as a runner-up

=== International ===
Iraq U20

- AFC Youth Championship: 1988

Iraq

- Arab Nations Cup: 1988
- Peace and Friendship Cup: 1989

=== Individual ===
- 1993–94 Iraqi Premier League: top scorer (36 goals)
- 1988 AFC Youth Championship: top scorer (23 goals)
