= Saleem Malakh =

Iraqi footballer (born 1957)

Personal information
- Full name: Saleem Malakh Aziz
- Date of birth: 1 July 1957 (age 69)
- Place of birth: Baghdad, Iraq
- Position: Striker

Senior career*
Years	Team	Apps	(Gls)
1975–1978	Al-Amana		
1978–1987	Al-Tayaran		

International career
1975	Iraq U17		
1975–1976	Iraq U20		
1980	Iraq U23		
1977–1981	Iraq		(1)

Managerial career
- Amanat Baghdad
- 1998–1999: Zakho
- Al-Karkh
- 2004: Iraq U14
- 2004–2005: Zakho
- * Club domestic league appearances and goals

Saleem Malakh (Arabic: سليم ملاخ عزيز, born 1 July 1957) was an International Iraqi former footballer, who played for Iraq national football team in 1977 Merdeka Tournament, 5th Arabian Gulf Cup and 1982 FIFA World Cup qualification.

== International goals ==
Scores and results list Iraq's goal tally first.

#	Date	Venue	Opponent	Score	Result	Competition
1	7 February 1979	Al-Shaab Stadium, Baghdad	Finland	2–0	2–0	Friendly match

== Honors ==
Al-Tayaran

- Iraq FA Cup: 1977–78

Iraq U20

- AFC U-20 Asian Cup: 1975

Iraq

- Arabian Gulf Cup: 1979
