= Maad Ibrahim =

Iraqi footballer

Maad Ibrahim Majid
Personal information
- Full name: Maad Ibrahim Majid
- Date of birth: 30 June 1960 (age 66)
- Place of birth: Iraq
- Position: Defender

Senior career*
Years	Team	Apps	(Gls)
1980–1985	Al Tijara		
1985–1986	Al Quwa Al Jawiya		
1986–1986	Al Rasheed		
1986–1987	Al Shorta		
1987–1991	Al Quwa Al Jawiya		
1991–1992	Al-Khutoot		
1992–1997	Al Naft		

International career
1985–1990	Iraq	16	(0)

Managerial career
- 1999–2001: Al-Naft
- * Club domestic league appearances and goals

Maad Ibrahim Majid (Arabic: مُعَاذ إِبْرَاهِيم مَاجِد; born 30 June 1960) is an Iraqi football defender who played for Iraq in the 1986 FIFA World Cup. He also played for Al-Rasheed Club.

Maad Ibrahim was a defender who was part of 1986 World Cup squad in Mexico. Maad made his name with Al-Tijara, Al-Shurta and Al-Qowa Al-Jawia.

He earned him a place in Iraq’s 1986 World Cup squad in Mexico, where he played in the last game against the hosts in place of suspended Al-Rasheed team-mate Samir Shaker in the centre of defence alongside Al-Jawiya legend Nadhim Shaker.
