= Ali Abdul-Kadhim =

Iraqi footballer (born 1965)

Personal information
- Full name: Ali Abdul-Kadhim Saeed
- Date of birth: 28 November 1965 (age 60)
- Place of birth: Iraq
- Position: Forward

International career
Years	Team	Apps	(Gls)
1987–1988	Iraq		

Ali Abdul-Kadhim Saeed (Arabic: عَلِيّ عَبْد الْكَاظِم سَعِيد; born 28 November 1965) is a former Iraqi football forward who played for Iraq at the 1988 Arab Nations Cup.

Abdul-Kadhim played for Iraq between 1987 and 1988.
