= Al-Kut SC =

Iraqi football club

- Full name: Al-Kut Sport Club
- Founded: 1956; 69 years ago
- Ground: Al-Kut Olympic Stadium
- Capacity: 20,000
- Chairman: Riyadh Samin
- Manager: Haider Ibrahim
- League: Iraqi Second Division League
Home colours	Away colours

Al-Kut Sport Club (Arabic: نادي الكوت الرياضي), is an Iraqi football club based in Wasit that plays in Iraqi Second Division League.

== History ==
=== 1991–2006 : Ups and downs ===
The 1991–92 season, the club played in Iraqi Premier League for the first time. They kept trying to compete with teams in the league for three seasons and they was mediating the teams in the league standings or close to relegation sometimes. In the fourth season, they were relegated to Iraqi First Division League at the end. But gained promotion one years later, they played in league in two seasons (1996–97, 1997–98, and were relegated to First Division League again, but gained promotion one years later. The club returned to play in the premier League for two more seasons (1999–2000, 2000–01), then relegated to First Division League for three consecutive years, and then returned to the premier League to play two season (2004–05), (2005–06) and then relegated at the end.

== Managerial history ==
- (Iraq) Majed Kadhim Al-Badri
- (Iraq) Bahaa Kadhim
- (Iraq) Haider Ibrahim
