= Mohamed Jassim Mahdi =

Iraqi footballer

Personal information
- Date of birth: 1 January 1971 (age 55)
- Place of birth: Iraq
- Position: Midfielder

Senior career*
Years	Team	Apps	(Gls)
1987–2003	Al-Zawraa	-	(-)

International career
–	Iraq	-	(-)
- * Club domestic league appearances and goals

Mohamed Jassim Mahdi (Arabic: مُحَمَّد جَاسِم مَهْدِيّ; born 1 January 1971) is an Iraqi football midfielder who played for Iraq in the 1996 Asian Cup. He also played for Al-Zawraa.

== Career ==
Mohammed Jassim joined Al-Zawra in 1987 and played with Al-Zawra throughout his career until his retirement in 2003. Mohammed Jassem is the oldest player in the history of the club with 24 titles. 7 times (91, 94, 95, 96, 99, 2000, 2001) Iraq Cup 10 times (89, 90, 91, 93, 94, 95, 96, 98, 99, 2000) Super Cup 3 times (98.99, 2000) Arab cooperation Council Championship 2 (89.90) Championship battles or 2 (91.99), the owner of the record of winning the league title with 7 times and share this number with players Salam Hashim and Mudhahar Khalaf. But won the league with one team is the team Zawra. He also holds the historic record by winning the trophy with a record 10 times

Mohammed Jassim was part of Iraq's 1996 Asian Cup campaign in the United Arab Emirates. He was one of the longest serving players at Al-Zawraa after nearly 13 years of service, where he has won 6 league championships and 10 cups. In the 1999 Cup final against Talaba, the midfielder scored the golden goal which gave Al-Zawraa the title in Ahmed Radhi’s last game for the club.

He also played in India and Bangladesh.
