= Saad Qais =

Iraqi footballer

Personal information
- Full name: Saad Qais Nuaman
- Date of birth: 2 July 1967 (age 59)
- Place of birth: Baghdad, Iraq
- Position: Left winger

Senior career*
Years	Team	Apps	(Gls)
1983–1986	Al-Shorta		(10)
1986–1990	Al Rasheed		
1990–1991	Al-Shorta		(8)
1991–1993	Al-Karkh		
1993–1994	Al Rayyan		
1994–1995	Al-Shorta		(17)
1995–1996	CA Batna		
1996–1998	Al-Shorta		(10)
1998–1999	Salam Zgharta		
1999–2001	Al-Shorta		(0)
2001–2005	SAFK Fagernes		

International career
1986–1993	Iraq	50	(13)
- * Club domestic league appearances and goals

Saad Qais Nuaman (Arabic: سَعْد قَيْس نُعْمَان), is an Iraqi former professional footballer born in 1967 who played in the Iraqi national team (1987–1993).

Saad was one of the star Iraqi players of the late 1980s and through the 1990s. He first made his name with Al-Shorta in the early 1980s, he later joined Al-Rasheed helping them win the League, cup and the Arab Club Championship in 1988 and another league title in 1989. He later revealed that he was forced to join the club by Uday Hussein, who punished the team after every loss.

He played in the Iraqi Olympic side in Seoul and the Gulf Cup in 1988.

Saad captained Al-Shorta to the Iraqi league title in 1998. In early 2001, he retired from football.

== Career statistics ==
=== International goals ===
Scores and results list Iraq's goal tally first.

No	Date	Venue	Opponent	Score	Result	Competition
1.	28 February 1990	Jaber Al-Ahmad International Stadium, Kuwait City	United Arab Emirates	2–2	2–2	10th Arabian Gulf Cup
2.	18 August 1992	Al-Hassan Stadium, Irbid	Ethiopia	6–0	13–0	1992 Jordan Tournament
3.	18 August 1992	Al-Hassan Stadium, Irbid	Ethiopia	12–0	13–0	1992 Jordan Tournament
4.	28 April 1993	Stadium, Ulsan	South Korea	2–2	2–2	Friendly
5.	26 May 1993	Al-Hassan Stadium, Irbid	Yemen	5–1	6–1	1994 FIFA World Cup qualification
6.	28 May 1993	Al-Hassan Stadium, Irbid	Pakistan	1–0	5–1	1994 FIFA World Cup qualification
7.	28 May 1993	Al-Hassan Stadium, Irbid	Pakistan	5–0	5–1	1994 FIFA World Cup qualification
8.	16 June 1993	Chengdu Sports Centre, Chengdu	Yemen	2–0	3–0	1994 FIFA World Cup qualification
9.	18 June 1993	Chengdu Sports Centre, Chengdu	Pakistan	1–0	4–0	1994 FIFA World Cup qualification
10.	18 June 1993	Chengdu Sports Centre, Chengdu	Pakistan	2–0	4–0	1994 FIFA World Cup qualification
