= Al-Araqa derby =

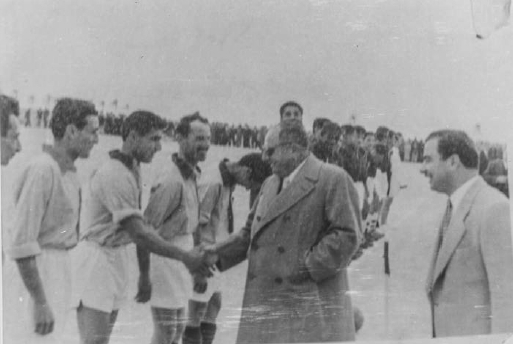
- The GCPI director shakes hands with Al-Quwa Al-Jawiya and Al-Minaa players before the start of the match at Basra in 1954. The match ended in a 1–1 draw.
- Location: Baghdad/Basra (Iraq)
- Teams: Al-Minaa; Al-Quwa Al-Jawiya
- First meeting: Al-Quwa Al-Jawiya 2–0 Al-Minaa; 1973–74 Iraqi National First Division
- Latest meeting: Al-Quwa Al-Jawiya 2–1 Al-Minaa; 2024–25 Iraq Stars League (27 September 2024)

Statistics
- Total meetings: 75 (League)
- Top scorer: Hammadi Ahmed (10 league goals)
- All-time series: League: Al-Quwa Al-Jawiya: 36; Drawn: 23; Al-Minaa: 16
- Largest victory: Al-Quwa Al-Jawiya 6–0 Al-Minaa; 1998–99 Iraqi Premier League (31 March 1999)

The Al-Quwa Al-Jawiya SC–Al-Minaa SC rivalry, sometimes referred to as Al-Araqa Derby, is a high-level competition between the two oldest established clubs in the history of Iraqi football clubs Al-Quwa Al-Jawiya and Al-Minaa (the two teams were founded in 1931). It is considered one of the largest matches in Iraqi football in terms of the number of spectators. Al-Quwa Al-Jawiya is considered among the four biggest clubs in Baghdad, the capital, while Al-Minaa, located in Basra in southern Iraq, is considered one of the biggest and most popular teams in the south, and is the first team that was able to obtain the league title from outside Baghdad.

The two teams had previously played against each other in 1950s and 1960s in friendly games before the national league was established in 1973, and their matches were characterized by excitement.

One of the historical precedents for this derby is that the first time a scoreboard was placed for Al-Shaab Stadium on 21 March 1977, was in this derby match, which ended with a score of 2–2 and the first to score in the match was Al-Quwa Al-Jawiya player Saleem Malakh.

In the 2004–05 season in Premier League, the teams were divided into groups, and the two teams reached the final match at Al-Shaab Stadium in Baghdad to determine the title, in which Al-Quwa Al-Jawiya won 2–0 to become champions, with Al-Minaa finishing in second place. Consequently, the two teams played in the 2006 AFC Champions League as Iraq's representatives in the tournament.

The derby was not without excitement in the field of sacking coaches due to the loss in it, as on 2 April 2016, Al-Quwa Al-Jawiya coach Sabah Abdul-Jalil was dismissed due to the loss to Al-Minaa at Basra International Stadium.

== Statistics ==
The first official match between the two clubs was a National First Division match in the 1973–74 season and resulted in a 2–0 victory for Al-Quwa Al-Jawiya. The first match in the Premier League was in the 1975–76 season where Al-Quwa Al-Jawiya (known as Al-Tayaran at the time) won 1–0 with a goal scored by the player Hanoon Mashkoor, while Ali Abdul-Zahra scored the first goal for Al-Minaa against Al-Quwa Al-Jawiya in the second match of the same season, which ended in a 1–1 draw.

The player who scored the most in the league was Hammadi Ahmed, who scored 10 goals for Al-Quwa Al-Jawiya against Al-Minaa, while Jalil Hanoon scored the most for Al-Minaa against Al-Quwa Al-Jawiya in the league, as he scored 8 goals. Al-Quwa Al-Jawiya scored 108 goals in the league, while Al-Minaa scored 66 goals. The biggest victory was a 6–0 victory for Al-Quwa Al-Jawiya in the 1998–99 season at Al-Shaab Stadium. The highest number of goals in one match recorded was 6–3 in favor of Al-Quwa Al-Jawiya in the 1983–84 season at Al-Shaab Stadium and 5–4 in favor of Al-Minaa in the 1994–95 season at Al-Shaab Stadium too.

One of the most beautiful goals in this derby was the winning goal scored by Hamza Adnan against Al-Quwa Al-Jawiya at Al-Quwa Al-Jawiya Stadium on 30 September 2015, which came from a free kick from a distance from the goal in stoppage time. The match ended with Al-Minaa winning 1–2.

League Results
	Al-Quwa Al-Jawiya wins	Draws	Al-Minaa wins
Premier League	35	23	16
National First Division	1	0	0

== All-time results ==
League matches only.

Al-Quwa Al-Jawiya win Al-Minaa win Draw

=== Al-Quwa Al-Jawiya at home ===
Al-Quwa Al-Jawiya result given first.

Date	Venue	Score	Competition
1973–74	Al-Shaab Stadium	2–0	National First Division
1975–76	Al-Shaab Stadium	1–0	Premier League
21 March 1978	Al-Shaab Stadium	2–2	Premier League
18 April 1980	Al-Shaab Stadium	0–1	Premier League
7 May 1981	Al-Shaab Stadium	4–0	Premier League
28 October 1981	Al-Shaab Stadium	1–0	Premier League
23 April 1983	Al-Shaab Stadium	1–1	Premier League
12 January 1984	Al-Shaab Stadium	6–3	Premier League
17 March 1986	Al-Shaab Stadium	3–2	Premier League
13 April 1988	Al-Shaab Stadium	1–0	Premier League
20 April 1991	Al-Shaab Stadium	0–1	Premier League
3 October 1991	Al-Shaab Stadium	2–2	Premier League
14 December 1992	Al-Shaab Stadium	3–1	Premier League
6 June 1993	Al-Shaab Stadium	2–0	Premier League
21 October 1993	Al-Shaab Stadium	3–0	Premier League
15 May 1995	Al-Shaab Stadium	4–5	Premier League
16 May 1996	Al-Shaab Stadium	4–0	Premier League
10 January 1997	Al-Shaab Stadium	3–0	Premier League
19 March 1998	Al-Shaab Stadium	2–0	Premier League
31 March 1999	Al-Shaab Stadium	6–0	Premier League
12 May 2000	Al-Shaab Stadium	1–0	Premier League
7 May 2001	Al-Karkh Stadium	0–0	Premier League
1 April 2002	Al-Shaab Stadium	2–0	Premier League
7 March 2003	Al-Shaab Stadium	3–1	Premier League
30 July 2008	Al-Shaab Stadium	1–0	Premier League
27 March 2011	Al-Quwa Al-Jawiya Stadium	2–1	Premier League
24 February 2012	Al-Quwa Al-Jawiya Stadium	2–1	Premier League
22 November 2012	Al-Quwa Al-Jawiya Stadium	1–3	Premier League
13 February 2014	Al-Quwa Al-Jawiya Stadium	1–0	Premier League
28 June 2015	Al-Shaab Stadium	0–0	Premier League
30 September 2015	Al-Quwa Al-Jawiya Stadium	1–2	Premier League
11 December 2016	Al-Quwa Al-Jawiya Stadium	2–1	Premier League
31 March 2018	Al-Shaab Stadium	1–1	Premier League
15 June 2019	Al-Shaab Stadium	1–1	Premier League
29 September 2019	Al-Shaab Stadium	0–0	Premier League
8 February 2021	Al-Shaab Stadium	2–1	Premier League
9 March 2022	Al-Shaab Stadium	2–1	Premier League
10 February 2024	Al-Shaab Stadium	4–2	Stars League
27 September 2024	Al-Shaab Stadium	2–1	Stars League

Al-Quwa Al-Jawiya wins	Draws	Al-Minaa wins
26	8	5

=== Al-Minaa at home ===
Al-Minaa result given first.

Date	Venue	Score	Competition
1975–76	Al-Minaa Stadium	1–1	Premier League
1976–77	Al-Minaa Stadium	0–3	Premier League
1978–79	Al-Minaa Stadium	3–0	Premier League
20 November 1979	Al-Minaa Stadium	4–2	Premier League
22 December 1981	Al-Minaa Stadium	0–2	Premier League
15 January 1983	Al-Minaa Stadium	1–0	Premier League
30 April 1984	Al-Minaa Stadium	1–3	Premier League
29 November 1984	Al-Minaa Stadium	0–1	Premier League
24 December 1987	Al-Minaa Stadium	1–2	Premier League
2 June 1991	Al-Minaa Stadium	0–0	Premier League
20 February 1992	Al-Minaa Stadium	1–1	Premier League
11 March 1993	Al-Minaa Stadium	0–0	Premier League
10 February 1994	Al-Minaa Stadium	0–0	Premier League
12 January 1995	Al-Minaa Stadium	0–1	Premier League
16 January 1996	Al-Minaa Stadium	2–0	Premier League
2 May 1997	Al-Minaa Stadium	0–1	Premier League
14 November 1997	Al-Minaa Stadium	0–1	Premier League
4 December 1998	Al-Minaa Stadium	2–1	Premier League
3 December 1999	Al-Minaa Stadium	0–0	Premier League
9 January 2001	Al-Minaa Stadium	0–0	Premier League
7 December 2001	Al-Minaa Stadium	1–1	Premier League
18 October 2002	Al-Minaa Stadium	2–0	Premier League
15 July 2005	Al-Shaab Stadium	0–2	Premier League
7 July 2008	Al-Minaa Stadium	1–0	Premier League
10 December 2010	Al-Minaa Stadium	2–1	Premier League
1 August 2012	Al-Minaa Stadium	2–0	Premier League
10 May 2013	Basra Stadium	1–3	Premier League
23 May 2015	Al-Zubair Stadium	0–0	Premier League
11 February 2016	Basra International Stadium	1–1	Premier League
2 April 2016	Basra International Stadium	1–0	Premier League
10 May 2017	Basra International Stadium	1–1	Premier League
21 November 2017	Basra International Stadium	0–0	Premier League
12 December 2018	Basra International Stadium	1–1	Premier League
12 July 2021	Al-Fayhaa Stadium	2–0	Premier League
26 October 2021	Al-Fayhaa Stadium	1–1	Premier League
18 May 2024	Al-Minaa Olympic Stadium	0–0	Stars League

Al-Quwa Al-Jawiya wins	Draws	Al-Minaa wins
10	15	11

== See also ==
- Al-Minaa SC
- Al-Quwa Al-Jawiya SC
