= Alaa Kadhim =

Iraqi footballer (born 1970)

Personal information
- Full name: Alaa Kadhim Jabur
- Date of birth: 1 July 1970 (age 56)
- Place of birth: Iraq
- Position: Striker

Senior career*
| Years | Team | Apps | (Gls) |
| 1987–1990 | Al Sinaa | | |
| 1990–1993 | Talaba SC | | |
| 1993–1997 | Al-Taawun | | |
| 1997–2007 | Talaba SC | | |

International career
| 1993–1999 | Iraq | 20 | (9) |
- * Club domestic league appearances and goals

Alaa Kadhim Jabur Al-Kinani (Arabic: عَلَاء كَاظِم جَبْر الْكِنَانِيّ; born 1 July 1970) is an Iraqi football striker who played for both the Iraq and Talaba SC, where he was also the club president.

Alaa was one of the best Iraqi strikers during the 90s during Iraq’s 1994 World Cup qualifying campaign. During the games, Alaa scored 7 goals, including the winner in the 2-1 win over Iran.

The forward started his career with Al-Sinaa before moving to Talaba in 1990. After his exploits for the national team during the qualifiers in Doha, he was offered a contract by Qatari club Al-Taawon (now Al-Khor) to play for them.

He made a few appearances for Iraq during the disastrous 1998 World Cup qualifiers losing both games to Kazakhstan, after helping Iraq win the 1997 Nehru Cup in India. Alaa was recalled to the national team by Najih Humoud and captained the team to the 1999 International Friendly Tournament, his last games for Iraq.

== Personal ==
He is the father of footballer Ameer Kinani.

== Career statistics ==
=== International goals ===
Scores and results list Iraq's goal tally first.

| No | Date | Venue | Opponent | Score | Result | Competition |
|---|---|---|---|---|---|---|
| 1. | 26 May 1993 | Al-Hassan Stadium, Irbid | Yemen | 2–0 | 1–1 | 1994 FIFA World Cup qualification |
| 2. | 26 May 1993 | Al-Hassan Stadium, Irbid | Yemen | 6–1 | 1–1 | 1994 FIFA World Cup qualification |
| 3. | 28 May 1993 | Al-Hassan Stadium, Irbid | Pakistan | 3–0 | 8–0 | 1994 FIFA World Cup qualification |
| 4. | 28 May 1993 | Al-Hassan Stadium, Irbid | Pakistan | 6–0 | 8–0 | 1994 FIFA World Cup qualification |
| 5. | 14 June 1993 | Chengdu Sports Centre, Chengdu | Jordan | 3–0 | 4–0 | 1994 FIFA World Cup qualification |
| 6. | 15 October 1993 | Khalifa International Stadium, Doha | North Korea | 1–0 | 2–3 | 1994 FIFA World Cup qualification |
| 7. | 15 October 1993 | Khalifa International Stadium, Doha | North Korea | 2–0 | 2–3 | 1994 FIFA World Cup qualification |
| 8. | 22 October 1993 | Khalifa International Stadium, Doha | Iran | 2–1 | 2–1 | 1994 FIFA World Cup qualification |
| 9. | 30 March 1997 | Kaloor International Stadium, Cochin | China | 2–0 | 2–0 | 1997 Nehru Cup |
