= Kirkuk SC =

Iraqi association football club

Kirkuk
- Full name: Kirkuk Football Club
- Founded: 1977; 48 years ago, as Wahid Huzairan
- Ground: Kirkuk Olympic Stadium
- Capacity: 23,000 (25.000)
- League: Iraqi Third Division League
Home colours	Away colours

Kirkuk Sports Club (Arabic: نادي كركوك, Kurdish: یانەی وەرزشیی کەرکووک) is a football club based in Kirkuk, Iraq. The team plays in Iraqi Third Division League.

Kirkuk participated in the Iraqi Premier League for the first time in 1983–84, but was relegated for several seasons to the lower divisions, before returning to the top-flight seasons later. They won the Iraqi First Division League in 2000–01.

== History ==
Kirkuk Sports Club was founded as Wahid Huzairan in 1977. In 1991 the club changed its name to Kirkuk.

== Honours ==
- Iraqi Premier Division League (second tier)
  - Champions (2): 1982–83, 2000–01
