= Al-Khutoot Al-Jawiya SC =

Iraqi football club

- Full name: Al-Khutoot Al-Jawiya Sport Club
- Nicknames: Al-Taayer Al-Akhdhar (The Green Bird)
- Founded: 1990; 36 years ago as Al-Tayaran
- Ground: Al-Khutoot Al-Jawiya Stadium
- Owner: Ministry of Transport
- Chairman: Akram Luaibi
- Manager: Ali Abboud
- League: Iraqi Third Division League
Home colours	Away colours

Al-Khutoot Al-Jawiya Sport Club (Arabic: نادي الخطوط الجوية الرياضي, lit. 'Airways SC'), is an Iraqi football team based in Al-A'amiriya, Baghdad, that plays in the Iraqi Third Division League.

== Managerial history ==
- (Iraq) Ali Wahaib
- (Iraq) Hazem Salih
- (Iraq) Sabah Jeayer
- (Iraq) Jumaa Jaber
- (Iraq) Mohammed Jassim
- (Iraq) Haider Jabbar
- (Iraq) Hadi Mtanish
- (Iraq) Dhiyab Nehair
- (Iraq) Ali Abboud

== Famous players ==
- (Iraq) Natiq Hashim
- (Iraq) Maad Ibrahim
- (Iraq) Hamza Hadi
- (Iraq) Khalil Allawi
- (Iraq) Raheem Hamid
- (Iraq) Haidar Mahmoud

== See also ==
- 2012–13 Iraq FA Cup
- 2015–16 Iraq FA Cup
- 2016–17 Iraq FA Cup
- 2018–19 Iraq FA Cup
