= 2022–23 Iraqi Second Division League =

Iraqi Second Division League
- Season: 2022–23
- Dates: 1 December 2022 – 6 August 2023
- Champions: Al-Karma (1st title)
- Promoted: Al-Karma; Ghaz Al-Shamal; Al-Gharraf; Al-Fahad
- Relegated: 25 teams
- All statistics correct as of 28 July 2023.

The 2022–23 Iraqi Second Division League was the 49th season of what is now called the Iraqi First Division League, the third tier of the Iraqi football league system, since its establishment in 1974. The number of clubs in the league has varied throughout history for various reasons; in this season the number of clubs was 98 (in addition to 26 pre-qualified teams from the previous season, playing starting from the second round, so the total is 124 teams). The top four teams (top 2 teams in each group) in the Final Qualifiers were promoted directly to the second tier, while teams that fail to qualify for the second round and finish in the bottom positions in the group ranking table will be relegated directly to the third tier. The season started on 1 December 2022.

In the Ultimate competing round of the league, in the group 1, Al-Karma and Al-Gharraf were able to top the group after each of them achieved 19 points, while in the group 2, Ghaz Al-Shamal and Al-Fahad topped the group after each of them achieved 22 points. All four teams were promoted to the second tier.

It was decided on August 6, to hold the final match to determine the league champion, between the leaders of the group 1, Al-Karma, and the leaders of the group 2, Ghaz Al-Shamal.

The final match was held at Al-Shaab Stadium in Baghdad, and Al-Karma was able to beat Ghaz Al-Shamal by penalty kicks (4–3) after the end of the regular time of the match, with the two teams drawing (1–1).

== Team changes ==
The following teams have changed division since the 2021–22 season:

=== To Iraqi Second Division League ===
Promoted from Third Division League

- Abnaa Al-Madina
- Al-Amir
- Al-Aziziya
- Al-Chibayish
- Al-Dair
- Al-Falluja
- Al-Ghadeer
- Al-Gharraf
- Al-Hadbaa
- Al-Hashd Al-Shaabi
- Al-Intifadha
- Al-Ishaqi
- Al-Iskan
- Al-Izza
- Al-Jawhara
- Al-Karma
- Al-Mahanawiya
- Al-Mahawil
- Al-Maqal
- Al-Osra
- Al-Shabab Al-Basri
- Al-Shaheed Arkan
- Al-Siyaha
- Al-Tijara
- Al-Wajihiya
- Al-Zaytoun
- Al-Zubaidiya
- Aliyat Al-Shorta
- Anah
- Habbaniyat Al-Sumood
- Jenaain Babil
- Kafaat Nineveh
- Masafi Al-Shamal
- Naft Al-Shamal
- Qandeel
- Taza

Relegated from the First Division League

- Al-Alam
- Babil
- Ghaz Al-Shamal
- Suq Al-Shuyukh

=== From Second Division League ===
Promoted to the First Division League

- Al-Etisalat
- Al-Hawija
- Al-Jolan
- Masafi Al-Wasat

Relegated to Third Division League

- Al-Ahrar
- Al-Amara
- Al-Anbar
- Al-Hamza
- Al-Husseiniyah
- Al-Khairat
- Al-Fosfat
- Al-Madhatyia
- Al-Mohandessin
- Al-Sadda
- Al-Taliea
- Al-Zaeem
- Baladiyat Al-Nasiriyah
- Bilad Al-Rafidain
- Daquq
- Ghaz Al-Janoob
- Jalawla
- Kahrabaa Al-Hartha
- Khallat
- New Sirwan
- Peshwa
- Salahaddin
- Sarchinar
- Shabab Al-Adil
- Tarmi
- Umm Qasr

== Competition format ==
=== Schedule ===
The Iraqi Second Division League starts with 98 clubs and ends with four qualified clubs according to three rounds, The teams that qualified for the second round last season and the teams that were relegated from the Iraqi First Division League in the 2021–22 season moved directly to play in the second round.

Round	Stage	Main date	Participating teams	Qualified teams	Qualify for
1st	In-governorates qualifiers	1 December 2022	98	27	In-territories qualifiers
2nd	In-territories qualifiers	31 March 2023	53	12	Final qualifiers
3rd	Final qualifiers	9 June 2023	12	4	Promotion to the Iraqi First Division League

== First round ==
The 98 clubs are divided into 16 groups depending on the location, except for the groups of Dohuk and Erbil, each group representing the governorate to which these clubs belong and is located within its borders.

=== 1- Dohuk Group ===
There are no teams in Dohuk that play in this division.

=== 2- Nineveh Group ===
Pos	Team	Pld	W	D	L	GF	GA	GD	Pts	Qualification or relegation
1	Baladiyat Al-Mosul (Q)	6	5	1	0	20	8	+12	16	Qualification to the Second round
2	Al-Hadbaa (Q)	6	4	0	2	10	6	+4	12	Qualification to the Second round
3	Umal Nineveh	6	3	2	1	15	10	+5	11	
4	Sahl Nineveh	6	1	5	0	10	9	+1	8	
5	Kafaat Nineveh	5	1	2	2	9	12	−3	5	
6	Al-Shoura	6	1	1	4	12	18	−6	4	
7	Rabia (R)	6	1	1	4	9	17	−8	4	Relegation to Iraqi Third Division League
8	Al-Mustaqbal Al-Mushriq (R)	5	1	0	4	6	11	−5	3	Relegation to Iraqi Third Division League

Updated to match(es) played on 21 January 2023. Source: IFA official website
Rules for classification: 1) points; 2) goal difference; 3) number of goals scored.
(Q) Qualified for the phase indicated; (R) Relegated

=== 3- Erbil Group ===
There are no teams in Erbil that play in this division.

=== 4- Kirkuk Group ===
Pos	Team	Pld	W	D	L	GF	GA	GD	Pts	Qualification or relegation
1	Musalla (Q)	1	0	1	0	0	0	0	1	Qualification to the Second round
2	Naft Al-Shamal (Q)	1	0	1	0	0	0	0	1	Qualification to the Second round
3	Qandeel	1	0	1	0	0	0	0	1	
4	Taza	1	0	1	0	0	0	0	1	
5	Al-Shorija (R)	0	0	0	0	0	0	0	0	Relegation to Iraqi Third Division League
6	Al-Dibis (R)	0	0	0	0	0	0	0	0	Relegation to Iraqi Third Division League

Updated to match(es) played on 15 December 2022. Source: IFA official website
Rules for classification: 1) points; 2) goal difference; 3) number of goals scored.
(Q) Qualified for the phase indicated; (R) Relegated

=== 5- Sulaymaniyah Group ===
Pos	Team	Pld	W	D	L	GF	GA	GD	Pts	Qualification or relegation
1	Sulaymaniya (Q)	2	2	0	0	6	2	+4	6	Qualification to the Second round
2	Penjwen (R)	2	0	0	2	2	6	−4	0	Relegation to Iraqi Third Division League

Updated to match(es) played on 23 December 2022. Source: IFA official website
Rules for classification: 1) points; 2) goal difference; 3) number of goals scored.
(Q) Qualified for the phase indicated; (R) Relegated

=== 6- Saladin Group ===
Pos	Team	Pld	W	D	L	GF	GA	GD	Pts	Qualification or relegation
1	Masafi Al-Shamal (Q)	10	6	2	2	24	11	+13	20	Qualification to the Second round
2	Al-Ishaqi (Q)	10	6	2	2	16	13	+3	20	Qualification to the Second round
3	Balad	10	5	2	3	16	11	+5	17	
4	Shabab Al-Dawr	10	5	1	4	13	11	+2	16	
5	Al-Dujail (R)	10	1	3	6	10	22	−12	6	Relegation to Iraqi Third Division League
6	Baiji (R)	10	1	2	7	7	19	−12	5	Relegation to Iraqi Third Division League

Updated to match(es) played on 3 February 2023. Source: IFA official website
Rules for classification: 1) points; 2) head-to-head points; 3) head-to-head goal difference; 4) goal difference; 5) number of wins; 6) number of goals scored.
(Q) Qualified for the phase indicated; (R) Relegated

=== 7- Al-Anbar Group ===
Pos	Team	Pld	W	D	L	GF	GA	GD	Pts	Qualification or relegation
1	Al-Fahad (Q)	16	10	5	1	32	13	+19	35	Qualification to the Second round
2	Al-Habbaniya (Q)	16	10	4	2	36	16	+20	34	Qualification to the Second round
3	Al-Karma	16	10	3	3	27	10	+17	33	
4	Al-Nasr Al-Anbari	16	7	5	4	21	16	+5	26	
5	Habbaniyat Al-Sumood	16	7	4	5	26	22	+4	25	
6	Al-Falluja	16	4	4	8	14	19	−5	16	
7	Anah	16	4	1	11	27	51	−24	13	
8	Hit (R)	16	3	3	10	20	30	−10	12	Relegation to Iraqi Third Division League
9	Al-Raed (R)	16	1	3	12	14	40	−26	6	Relegation to Iraqi Third Division League

Updated to match(es) played on 20 February 2023. Source: IFA official website
Rules for classification: 1) points; 2) head-to-head points; 3) head-to-head goal difference; 4) goal difference; 5) number of wins; 6) number of goals scored.
(Q) Qualified for the phase indicated; (R) Relegated

=== 8- Baghdad Groups ===
==== Group 1 ====
Pos	Team	Pld	W	D	L	GF	GA	GD	Pts	Qualification or relegation
1	Al-Hashd Al-Shaabi (Q)	12	6	5	1	19	15	+4	23 (Note: Position defined by head-to-head points.)	Qualification to the Second round
2	Haifa (Q)	12	7	2	3	12	8	+4	23	Qualification to the Second round
3	Al-Taji (Q)	12	7	2	3	20	7	+13	23	Qualification to the Second round
4	Al-Adala	12	4	5	3	20	14	+6	17	
5	Al-Iskan	12	4	4	4	14	19	−5	16	
6	Al-Jaish (R)	12	3	3	6	18	19	−1	12	Relegation to Iraqi Third Division League
7	Abnaa Al-Madina (R)	12	0	3	9	9	29	−20	3	Relegation to Iraqi Third Division League

Updated to match(es) played on 3 April 2023. Source: IFA official website
Rules for classification: 1) points; 2) head-to-head points; 3) head-to-head goal difference; 4) goal difference; 5) number of wins; 6) number of goals scored.
(Q) Qualified for the phase indicated; (R) Relegated

==== Group 2 ====
Pos	Team	Pld	W	D	L	GF	GA	GD	Pts	Qualification or relegation
1	Al-Tijara (Q)	10	6	2	2	18	13	+5	20	Qualification to the Second round
2	Aliyat Al-Shorta (Q)	10	5	4	1	22	11	+11	19	Qualification to the Second round
3	Al-Mahmoudiya (Q)	10	3	5	2	15	14	+1	14	Qualification to the Second round
4	Al-Siyaha	10	2	5	3	11	14	−3	11	
5	Al-Shuala	10	2	5	3	11	15	−4	11	
6	Al-Najda (R)	10	2	3	5	12	15	−3	9	Relegation to Iraqi Third Division League
7	Al-Jamiea (Note: Al-Jamiea withdrew from the tournament.) (R)	0	0	0	0	0	0	0	0	Relegation to Iraqi Third Division League

Updated to match(es) played on 14 March 2023. Source: IFA official website
Rules for classification: 1) points; 2) head-to-head points; 3) head-to-head goal difference; 4) goal difference; 5) number of wins; 6) number of goals scored.
(Q) Qualified for the phase indicated; (R) Relegated

=== 9- Diyala Group ===
Pos	Team	Pld	W	D	L	GF	GA	GD	Pts	Qualification or relegation
1	Jadidat Al-Shatt (Q)	8	2	6	0	7	4	+3	12	Qualification to the Second round
2	Al-Shaheed Arkan	8	2	4	2	11	10	+1	10	
3	Shahraban	8	2	4	2	13	16	−3	10	
4	Al-Wajihiya	8	1	5	2	6	6	0	8	
5	Qazaniya (R)	8	1	5	2	12	13	−1	8	Relegation to Iraqi Third Division League

Updated to match(es) played on 23 January 2023. Source: IFA official website
Rules for classification: 1) points; 2) head-to-head points; 3) head-to-head goal difference; 4) goal difference; 5) number of wins; 6) number of goals scored.
(Q) Qualified for the phase indicated; (R) Relegated

=== 10- Karbalaa Group ===
Pos	Team	Pld	W	D	L	GF	GA	GD	Pts	Qualification or relegation
1	Al-Osra (Q)	6	3	1	2	8	5	+3	10	Qualification to the Second round
2	Al-Hurr	6	2	3	1	7	4	+3	9	
3	Al-Hindiya	6	2	3	1	6	4	+2	9	
4	Al-Ghadeer (R)	6	1	1	4	1	9	−8	4	Relegation to Iraqi Third Division League

Updated to match(es) played on 11 January 2023. Source: IFA official website
Rules for classification: 1) points; 2) head-to-head points; 3) head-to-head goal difference; 4) goal difference; 5) number of wins; 6) number of goals scored.
(Q) Qualified for the phase indicated; (R) Relegated

=== 11- Babil Group ===
Pos	Team	Pld	W	D	L	GF	GA	GD	Pts	Qualification or relegation
1	Al-Jawhara (Q)	7	5	1	1	10	5	+5	16	Qualification to the Second round
2	Al-Mahawil	7	4	1	2	11	7	+4	13	
3	Al-Mashroua	6	3	0	3	11	9	+2	9	
4	Jenaain Babil	6	1	1	4	5	8	−3	4	
5	Al-Musayyib (R)	4	0	1	3	1	9	−8	1	Relegation to Iraqi Third Division League

Updated to match(es) played on 18 January 2023. Source: IFA official website
Rules for classification: 1) points; 2) head-to-head points; 3) head-to-head goal difference; 4) goal difference; 5) number of wins; 6) number of goals scored.
(Q) Qualified for the phase indicated; (R) Relegated

=== 12- Wasit Groups ===
==== Group 1 ====
Pos	Team	Pld	W	D	L	GF	GA	GD	Pts	Qualification or relegation
1	Al-Kut (Q)	6	3	3	0	14	5	+9	12	Qualification to the Second round
2	Al-Zubaidiya	6	3	1	2	9	8	+1	10	
3	Al-Izza	6	2	1	3	11	9	+2	7	
4	Al-Aziziya (R)	6	1	1	4	7	19	−12	4	Relegation to Iraqi Third Division League

Updated to match(es) played on 15 January 2023. Source: IFA official website
Rules for classification: 1) points; 2) head-to-head points; 3) head-to-head goal difference; 4) goal difference; 5) number of wins; 6) number of goals scored.
(Q) Qualified for the phase indicated; (R) Relegated

==== Group 2 ====
Pos	Team	Pld	W	D	L	GF	GA	GD	Pts	Qualification or relegation
1	Al-Hay (Q)	5	3	1	1	8	5	+3	10	Qualification to the Second round
2	Al-Jihad	5	1	2	2	7	6	+1	5	
3	Al-Muwafaqiya	5	1	2	2	5	6	−1	5	
4	Al-Zaytoun (R)	5	0	3	2	5	8	−3	3	Relegation to Iraqi Third Division League

Updated to match(es) played on 12 January 2023. Source: IFA official website
Rules for classification: 1) points; 2) head-to-head points; 3) head-to-head goal difference; 4) goal difference; 5) number of wins; 6) number of goals scored.
(Q) Qualified for the phase indicated; (R) Relegated

=== 13- Al-Najaf Group ===
Pos	Team	Pld	W	D	L	GF	GA	GD	Pts	Qualification or relegation
1	Al-Izdihar (Q)	3	3	0	0	10	2	+8	9	Qualification to the Second round
2	Al-Khawarnaq	3	1	1	1	2	3	−1	4	
3	Al-Tadamon	3	1	0	2	4	7	−3	3	
4	Al-Meshkhab (R)	3	0	1	2	2	6	−4	1	Relegation to Iraqi Third Division League

Updated to match(es) played on 1 January 2023. Source: IFA official website
Rules for classification: 1) points; 2) goal difference; 3) number of goals scored.
(Q) Qualified for the phase indicated; (R) Relegated

=== 14- Al-Qādisiyyah Group ===
Pos	Team	Pld	W	D	L	GF	GA	GD	Pts	Qualification or relegation
1	Al-Ettifaq (Q)	8	5	3	0	18	9	+9	18	Qualification to the Second round
2	Al-Intifadha	7	4	2	1	13	8	+5	14	
3	Al-Najma	7	2	3	2	8	9	−1	9	
4	Al-Shamiya	7	2	2	3	15	16	−1	8	
5	Al-Mahanawiya (R)	7	0	0	7	7	17	−10	0	Relegation to Iraqi Third Division League

Updated to match(es) played on 28 January 2023. Source: IFA official website
Rules for classification: 1) points; 2) head-to-head points; 3) head-to-head goal difference; 4) goal difference; 5) number of wins; 6) number of goals scored.
(Q) Qualified for the phase indicated; (R) Relegated

=== 15- Maysan Group ===
Pos	Team	Pld	W	D	L	GF	GA	GD	Pts	Qualification or relegation
1	Qalat Saleh (Q)	6	2	4	0	13	7	+6	10	Qualification to the Second round
2	Al-Amir	6	2	3	1	12	8	+4	9	
3	Al-Maimouna	6	2	3	1	6	5	+1	9	
4	Dijlah (R)	6	0	2	4	4	15	−11	2	Relegation to Iraqi Third Division League

Updated to match(es) played on 5 January 2023. Source: IFA official website
Rules for classification: 1) points; 2) head-to-head points; 3) head-to-head goal difference; 4) goal difference; 5) number of wins; 6) number of goals scored.
(Q) Qualified for the phase indicated; (R) Relegated

=== 16- Al-Muthanna Group ===
Pos	Team	Pld	W	D	L	GF	GA	GD	Pts	Qualification or relegation
1	Uruk (Q)	5	3	1	1	7	4	+3	10	Qualification to the Second round
2	Al-Muthanna	5	2	2	1	6	4	+2	8	
3	Al-Salman	5	2	1	2	5	5	0	7	
4	Al-Rumaitha	5	1	1	3	6	9	−3	4	
5	Thawrat Al-Eshreen (R)	4	0	3	1	1	3	−2	3	Relegation to Iraqi Third Division League

Updated to match(es) played on 14 January 2023. Source: IFA official website
Rules for classification: 1) points; 2) head-to-head points; 3) head-to-head goal difference; 4) goal difference; 5) number of wins; 6) number of goals scored.
(Q) Qualified for the phase indicated; (R) Relegated

=== 17- Dhi Qar Group ===
Pos	Team	Pld	W	D	L	GF	GA	GD	Pts	Qualification or relegation
1	Al-Gharraf (Q)	7	5	2	0	9	3	+6	17	Qualification to the Second round
2	Al-Rifai	8	3	3	2	10	9	+1	12	
3	Akkad	5	1	2	2	5	6	−1	5	
4	Al-Chibayish	6	1	2	3	3	7	−4	5	
5	Al-Shatra (R)	6	1	1	4	3	5	−2	4	Relegation to Iraqi Third Division League

Updated to match(es) played on 26 January 2023. Source: IFA official website
Rules for classification: 1) points; 2) head-to-head points; 3) head-to-head goal difference; 4) goal difference; 5) number of wins; 6) number of goals scored.
(Q) Qualified for the phase indicated; (R) Relegated

=== 18- Basra Group ===
Pos	Team	Pld	W	D	L	GF	GA	GD	Pts	Qualification or relegation
1	Al-Sadeq (Q)	6	4	1	1	16	11	+5	13	Qualification to the Second round
2	Safwan (Q)	6	3	3	0	10	5	+5	12	Qualification to the Second round
3	Al-Dair	6	2	4	0	6	3	+3	10	
4	Al-Maqal	5	2	1	2	7	5	+2	7	
5	Al-Shabab Al-Basri	5	1	2	2	8	8	0	5	
6	Al-Khaleej Al-Arabi	5	1	2	2	7	13	−6	5	
7	Al-Fayhaa (R)	5	1	0	4	5	8	−3	3	Relegation to Iraqi Third Division League
8	Al-Basra (R)	4	0	1	3	4	8	−4	1	Relegation to Iraqi Third Division League

Updated to match(es) played on 28 December 2022. Source: IFA official website
Rules for classification: 1) points; 2) goal difference; 3) number of goals scored.
(Q) Qualified for the phase indicated; (R) Relegated

=== Qualified teams ===
The 26 pre-qualified teams and the 27 teams coming from the first round are all divided into five groups by location, and these groups have sub-groups. The first from each group is considered a winner, the winning teams advance directly to the third round.

Rank	Groups	Governorates	Winners teams	Pre-qualified teams
1	Northern Group	Dohuk		Shekhan
1	Northern Group	Nineveh	Baladiyat Al-Mosul; Al-Hadbaa	Al-Amwaj Al-Mosuli; Al-Mosul
1	Northern Group	Erbil		Ararat; Handren
1	Northern Group	Kirkuk	Musalla; Naft Al-Shamal	Ghaz Al-Shamal
1	Northern Group	Sulaymaniyah	Sulaymaniya	Baban
2	Western Group	Saladin	Masafi Al-Shamal; Al-Ishaqi	Al-Alam
2	Western Group	Al-Anbar	Al-Fahad; Al-Karma^{[a]}	Al-Sufiya
2	Western Group	Diyala	Jadidat Al-Shatt	Al-Khalis; Balad Ruz
3	Baghdad Group	Baghdad	Al-Hashd Al-Shaabi; Al-Mahmoudiya; Al-Taji; Al-Tijara; Aliyat Al-Shorta; Haifa	Al-Kadhimiya; Al-Khutoot Al-Jawiya; Al-Sikak; Al-Zafaraniya
4	Central Euphrates Group	Karbalaa	Al-Osra	Al-Ghadhriya
4	Central Euphrates Group	Babil	Al-Jawhara	Al-Kifl
4	Central Euphrates Group	Al-Najaf	Al-Izdihar	
4	Central Euphrates Group	Al-Qādisiyyah	Al-Ettifaq	Al Bdeir
4	Central Euphrates Group	Al-Muthanna	Uruk	Al-Khidhir
5	Southern Group	Wasit	Al-Hay; Al-Kut	Al-Numaniya; Al-Suwaira
5	Southern Group	Maysan	Qalat Saleh	Al-Sukar
5	Southern Group	Dhi Qar	Al-Gharraf	Al-Furat; Suq Al-Shuyukh
5	Southern Group	Basra	Al-Sadeq; Safwan	Al-Qurna; Al-Zubair

^{[a]} Al-Karma replaced Al-Habbaniya.

== Second round ==
The draw for the Central Euphrates Group and Southern Group regions was held on February 21, 2023, and the Western Group on February 22, while the Northern Group draw was held in February 25.

=== Northern section ===
==== Group 1 ====
Pos	Team	Pld	W	D	L	GF	GA	GD	Pts	Qualification or relegation
1	Naft Al-Shamal (Q)	4	4	0	0	8	0	+8	12	Qualification to the Third round
2	Al-Amwaj Al-Mosuli	4	1	1	2	2	4	−2	4	
3	Handren	4	0	1	3	0	6	−6	1	
4	Baban (Note: Baban withdrew from the tournament.)	0	0	0	0	0	0	0	0	

Updated to match(es) played on 28 April 2023. Source: IFA official website
Rules for classification: 1) points; 2) head-to-head points; 3) head-to-head goal difference; 4) goal difference; 5) number of wins; 6) number of goals scored.
(Q) Qualified for the phase indicated

==== Group 2 ====
Pos	Team	Pld	W	D	L	GF	GA	GD	Pts	Qualification or relegation
1	Ghaz Al-Shamal (Q)	4	3	0	1	6	2	+4	9	Qualification to the Third round
2	Baladiyat Al-Mosul	3	1	1	1	4	4	0	4	
3	Shekhan	3	0	1	2	1	5	−4	1	
4	Sulaymaniya (Note: Sulaymaniya withdrew from the tournament.)	0	0	0	0	0	0	0	0	

Updated to match(es) played on 20 April 2023. Source: IFA official website
Rules for classification: 1) points; 2) head-to-head points; 3) head-to-head goal difference; 4) goal difference; 5) number of wins; 6) number of goals scored.
(Q) Qualified for the phase indicated

==== Group 3 ====
Pos	Team	Pld	W	D	L	GF	GA	GD	Pts	Qualification or relegation
1	Al-Mosul (Q)	5	3	2	0	15	6	+9	11	Qualification to the Third round
2	Musalla	5	2	1	2	13	8	+5	7	
3	Ararat	5	1	2	2	5	10	−5	5	
4	Al-Hadbaa	5	0	3	2	4	13	−9	3	

Updated to match(es) played on 22 April 2023. Source: IFA official website
Rules for classification: 1) points; 2) head-to-head points; 3) head-to-head goal difference; 4) goal difference; 5) number of wins; 6) number of goals scored.
(Q) Qualified for the phase indicated

=== Western section ===
==== Group 1 ====
Pos	Team	Pld	W	D	L	GF	GA	GD	Pts	Qualification or relegation
1	Al-Karma (Q)	6	3	2	1	11	5	+6	11	Qualification to the Third round
2	Jadidat Al-Shatt	6	3	2	1	12	9	+3	11	
3	Al-Alam	6	1	3	2	7	10	−3	6	
4	Al-Ishaqi	6	0	3	3	4	10	−6	3	

Updated to match(es) played on 8 May 2023. Source: IFA official website
Rules for classification: 1) points; 2) head-to-head points; 3) head-to-head goal difference; 4) goal difference; 5) number of wins; 6) number of goals scored.
(Q) Qualified for the phase indicated

==== Group 2 ====
Pos	Team	Pld	W	D	L	GF	GA	GD	Pts	Qualification or relegation
1	Al-Fahad (Q)	7	5	2	0	15	4	+11	17	Qualification to the Third round
2	Al-Sufiya	7	4	1	2	13	11	+2	13	
3	Al-Khalis	7	3	2	2	9	10	−1	11	
4	Masafi Al-Shamal	7	2	1	4	13	15	−2	7	
5	Balad Ruz	8	1	0	7	6	16	−10	3	

Updated to match(es) played on 12 May 2023. Source: IFA official website
Rules for classification: 1) points; 2) head-to-head points; 3) head-to-head goal difference; 4) goal difference; 5) number of wins; 6) number of goals scored.
(Q) Qualified for the phase indicated

=== Baghdad section ===
==== Group 1 ====
Pos	Team	Pld	W	D	L	GF	GA	GD	Pts	Qualification or relegation
1	Al-Hashd Al-Shaabi (Q)	8	7	0	1	13	3	+10	21	Qualification to the Third round
2	Al-Kadhimiya	7	4	2	1	8	6	+2	14	
3	Haifa	7	1	3	3	6	7	−1	6	
4	Al-Zafaraniya	6	1	2	3	6	9	−3	5	
5	Al-Tijara	6	0	1	5	0	8	−8	1	

Updated to match(es) played on 24 May 2023. Source: IFA official website
Rules for classification: 1) points; 2) head-to-head points; 3) head-to-head goal difference; 4) goal difference; 5) number of wins; 6) number of goals scored.
(Q) Qualified for the phase indicated

==== Group 2 ====
Pos	Team	Pld	W	D	L	GF	GA	GD	Pts	Qualification or relegation
1	Al-Taji (Q)	8	5	2	1	19	9	+10	17	Qualification to the Third round
2	Al-Khutoot Al-Jawiya	6	4	1	1	13	4	+9	13	
3	Al-Sikak	6	2	2	2	10	7	+3	8	
4	Aliyat Al-Shorta	7	2	2	3	9	10	−1	8	
5	Al-Mahmoudiya	7	0	1	6	5	26	−21	1	

Updated to match(es) played on 28 May 2023. Source: IFA official website
Rules for classification: 1) points; 2) head-to-head points; 3) head-to-head goal difference; 4) goal difference; 5) number of wins; 6) number of goals scored.
(Q) Qualified for the phase indicated

=== Central Euphrates section ===
==== Group 1 ====
Pos	Team	Pld	W	D	L	GF	GA	GD	Pts	Qualification or relegation
1	Al-Kifl (Q)	6	4	2	0	11	5	+6	14	Qualification to the Third round
2	Al-Khidhir	6	3	1	2	6	5	+1	10	
3	Al-Ettifaq	6	1	2	3	4	7	−3	5	
4	Al-Osra	6	0	3	3	7	11	−4	3	

Updated to match(es) played on 13 May 2023. Source: IFA official website
Rules for classification: 1) points; 2) head-to-head points; 3) head-to-head goal difference; 4) goal difference; 5) number of wins; 6) number of goals scored.
(Q) Qualified for the phase indicated

==== Group 2 ====
Pos	Team	Pld	W	D	L	GF	GA	GD	Pts	Qualification or relegation
1	Al-Jawhara (Q)	7	4	2	1	12	4	+8	14	Qualification to the Third round
2	Al Bdeir	6	2	2	2	11	11	0	8	
3	Al-Izdihar	6	2	2	2	7	7	0	8	
4	Uruk	7	1	4	2	8	9	−1	7	
5	Al-Ghadhriya	6	1	2	3	4	11	−7	5	

Updated to match(es) played on 17 May 2023. Source: IFA official website
Rules for classification: 1) points; 2) head-to-head points; 3) head-to-head goal difference; 4) goal difference; 5) number of wins; 6) number of goals scored.
(Q) Qualified for the phase indicated

=== Southern section ===
==== Group 1 ====
Pos	Team	Pld	W	D	L	GF	GA	GD	Pts	Qualification or relegation
1	Al-Furat (Q)	6	4	1	1	9	2	+7	13	Qualification to the Third round
2	Al-Numaniya	6	2	2	2	6	8	−2	8	
3	Al-Zubair	6	1	4	1	6	6	0	7	
4	Al-Hay	6	0	3	3	6	11	−5	3	

Updated to match(es) played on 6 May 2023. Source: IFA official website
Rules for classification: 1) points; 2) head-to-head points; 3) head-to-head goal difference; 4) goal difference; 5) number of wins; 6) number of goals scored.
(Q) Qualified for the phase indicated

==== Group 2 ====
Pos	Team	Pld	W	D	L	GF	GA	GD	Pts	Qualification or relegation
1	Al-Kut (Q)	6	4	1	1	12	5	+7	13	Qualification to the Third round
2	Al-Qurna	6	4	0	2	16	8	+8	12	
3	Suq Al-Shuyukh	6	2	0	4	7	13	−6	6	
4	Al-Sukar	6	1	1	4	6	15	−9	4	

Updated to match(es) played on 1 June 2023. Source: IFA official website
Rules for classification: 1) points; 2) head-to-head points; 3) head-to-head goal difference; 4) goal difference; 5) number of wins; 6) number of goals scored.
(Q) Qualified for the phase indicated

==== Group 3 ====
Pos	Team	Pld	W	D	L	GF	GA	GD	Pts	Qualification or relegation
1	Al-Gharraf (Q)	8	5	3	0	14	8	+6	18 (Note: Position defined by head-to-head points.)	Qualification to the Third round
2	Al-Suwaira	8	6	0	2	17	9	+8	18	
3	Al-Sadeq	8	2	3	3	20	13	+7	9	
4	Qalat Saleh	8	1	2	5	5	14	−9	5	
5	Safwan	8	1	2	5	4	16	−12	5	

Updated to match(es) played on 16 May 2023. Source: IFA official website
Rules for classification: 1) points; 2) head-to-head points; 3) head-to-head goal difference; 4) goal difference; 5) number of wins; 6) number of goals scored.
(Q) Qualified for the phase indicated

== Third round ==
The twelve qualified teams have been divided into two groups, and the first two teams from each group will be promoted to Iraqi First Division League, and the draw took place on May 30, 2023.

After the lottery was drawn between the qualified teams, Al-Qurna was replaced by Al-Kut, due to the appeal decision issued by the Football Association, as Al-Kut considered a winner over Suq Al-Shuyukh with a score 3–0 instead of the draw result with which the match ended, and thus Al-Kut has got on 13 points ahead of Al-Qurna who has 12 points.

=== Ultimate competing teams ===
Locations of the 2022–23 Iraqi Second Division League teams in the Final Qualifiers

Team	Manager	Location	Stadium	Capacity
Al-Fahad	(Iraq) Anmar Salam	Al-Anbar (Al-Khalidiya)	Al-Ramadi Stadium	15,000
Al-Furat	(Iraq) Nayef Falah	Dhi Qar (Suq al-Shuyukh)	Suq Al-Shuyukh Stadium	5,000
Al-Gharraf	(Iraq) Moayad Tauma	Dhi Qar (Al-Gharraf)	Al-Shatra Stadium	7,500
Al-Hashd Al-Shaabi	(Iraq) Azhar Taher	Baghdad (Al-Jadriya)	Al-Saher Ahmed Radhi Stadium	5,150
Al-Jawhara	(Iraq) Qahtan Dakhel	Babil (Hillah)	Al-Hashimiya Stadium	5,000
Al-Karma	(Iraq) Shaker Mohammed Sabbar	Al-Anbar (Al-Karmah)	Al-Fallujah Stadium	7,000
Al-Kifl	(Iraq) Nadhim Hussein	Babil (Al-Kifl)	Al-Kifl Stadium	8,000
Al-Kut	(Iraq) Haider Ibrahim	Wasit	Al-Kut Olympic Stadium	20,000
Al-Mosul	(Iraq) Ziyad Mahmoud	Nineveh	Mosul University Stadium	20,000
Al-Taji	(Iraq) Zuhair Abdul-Ridha	Baghdad (Taji)	Al-Taji Stadium	5,000
Ghaz Al-Shamal	(Iraq) Natiq Haddad	Kirkuk (Yaychi)	Ghaz Al-Shamal Stadium	5,000
Naft Al-Shamal	(Iraq) Ahmed Habib	Kirkuk (Baba Gurgur)	Khak Stadium	5,000

=== Final Qualifiers ===
==== Group 1 ====
Pos	Team	Pld	W	D	L	GF	GA	GD	Pts	Qualification or relegation	KAR	GHF	MOS	TAJ	NAF	KIF
1	Al-Karma (P)	10	6	1	3	16	12	+4	19 (Note: Position defined by head-to-head points.)	Promotion to the Iraqi First Division League		2–0	2–1	3–3	2–0	2–0
2	Al-Gharraf (P)	10	6	1	3	18	10	+8	19	Promotion to the Iraqi First Division League	0–1		0–0	1–0	2–0	3–0
3	Al-Mosul	10	4	4	2	13	9	+4	16		1–2	2–0		2–2	2–1	2–0
4	Al-Taji	10	4	4	2	16	14	+2	16		2–1	2–4	1–1		2–1	1–0
5	Naft Al-Shamal	10	2	3	5	12	17	−5	9		2–1	2–3	1–1	1–1		2–1
6	Al-Kifl	10	1	1	8	7	20	−13	4		3–0	1–5	0–1	0–2	2–2	

Updated to match(es) played on 27 July 2023. Source: IFA official website
Legend: Blue = home team win; Yellow = draw; Red = away team win.
Rules for classification: 1) points; 2) head-to-head points; 3) head-to-head goal difference; 4) goal difference; 5) number of wins; 6) number of goals scored.
(P) Promoted

==== Group 2 ====
Pos	Team	Pld	W	D	L	GF	GA	GD	Pts	Qualification or relegation	GHZ	FAH	FUR	JAW	HAS	KUT
1	Ghaz Al-Shamal (P)	10	7	1	2	12	8	+4	22 (Note: Position defined by head-to-head points.)	Promotion to the Iraqi First Division League		2–1	2–0	1–1	1–0	1–0
2	Al-Fahad (P)	10	7	1	2	16	7	+9	22	Promotion to the Iraqi First Division League	0–1		1–0	5–2	3–2	1–0
3	Al-Furat	10	4	3	3	13	7	+6	15		2–0	0–0		4–0	3–0	3–2
4	Al-Jawhara	10	2	4	4	10	18	−8	10		3–0	0–1	0–0		0–0	3–2
5	Al-Hashd Al-Shaabi	10	2	2	6	12	14	−2	8		0–2	0–1	1–1	4–0		4–1
6	Al-Kut	10	2	1	7	10	19	−9	7		1–2	0–3	1–0	1–1	2–1	

Updated to match(es) played on 28 July 2023. Source: IFA official website
Legend: Blue = home team win; Yellow = draw; Red = away team win.
Rules for classification: 1) points; 2) head-to-head points; 3) head-to-head goal difference; 4) goal difference; 5) number of wins; 6) number of goals scored.
(P) Promoted

== Final ==
6 August 2023
20:00 UTC+3

Al-Karma	1–1	Ghaz Al-Shamal
Mahmoud 80'	Report	Jamal 17' (pen.)
Penalties
	4–3

Al-Shaab Stadium, Baghdad
Referee: Ali Karim

Al-Karma	Ghaz Al-Shamal

GK	32	(Iraq) Omar Abboud
RB	29	(Iraq) Sajjad Deabes
CB	37	(Iraq) Ziyad Khalaf
CB	4	(Iraq) Anaid Shaaban
LB	66	(Iraq) Koran Emad
CM	8	(Iraq) Ali Najem
CM	77	(Iraq) Abdullah Sarbast
CM	6	(Yemen) Gehad Abdulrab
RF	7	(Iraq) Ibrahim Khaled
CF	11	(Iraq) Ali Sulayman
LF	21	(Iraq) Hussein Yasser
Manager:
(Iraq) Shaker Mohammed Sabbar

GK	37	(Iraq) Abdullah Hamad
RB	70	(Iraq) Abdul-Muhaimen Abdullah
CB	23	(Iraq) Laith Jalil
CB	3	(Iraq) Hussein Jamal
LB	17	(Iraq) Omar Tariq
CM	88	(Iraq) Ahmed Hussein
CM	25	(Iraq) Aassi Sultan
CM	9	(Iraq) Ahmed Khalaf
RF	7	(Iraq) Ayad Khalaf
CF	10	(Iraq) Yasser Naji
LF	18	(Iraq) Mustafa Brisho
Manager:
(Iraq) Natiq Haddad

Match officials

- Assistant referees:
  - Safin Qader
  - Thul-Faqar Khalil
- Fourth official: Ahmed Ali Talib

Match rules

- 90 minutes.
- Penalty shootout if scores still level.
- Maximum of five substitutions

== Final qualifiers statistics ==
As of 28 July 2023

=== Top scorers ===
Rank	Player	Club	Goals
1	(Iraq) Ahmed Mahood	Al-Furat	7
1	(Iraq) Ahmed Rahim	Al-Hashd Al-Shaabi	7
3	(Iraq) Abbas Raysan	Al-Gharraf	6
3	(Iraq) Yasser Naji	Ghaz Al-Shamal	6
3	(Iraq) Hussein Sharar	Al-Kifl	6
3	(Iraq) Serri Jamal	Al-Fahad	6
7	(Iraq) Ali Sulayman	Al-Karma	5
7	(Iraq) Dana Kameran	Naft Al-Shamal	5
9	(Iraq) Ali Kowti	Al-Gharraf	4
9	(Iraq) Ibrahim Khaled	Al-Karma	4
9	(Iraq) Ali Fadhel	Al-Gharraf	4

==== Hat-tricks ====
Player	For	Against	Result	Date
(Iraq) Serri Jamal^{4}	Al-Fahad	Al-Jawhara	5–2 (H)	22 June 2023
(Iraq) Hussein Sharar	Al-Kifl	Al-Karma	3–0 (H)	2 July 2023
(Iraq) Ahmed Mahood	Al-Furat	Al-Kut	3–2 (H)	18 July 2023

Notes

^{4} Player scored 4 goals
(H) – Home team
(A) – Away team
