= 2023–24 Iraqi Premier Division League =

Iraqi Premier Division League
- Season: 2023–24
- Dates: 1 December 2023 – 20 July 2024
- Champions: Diyala (2nd title)
- Promoted: Diyala; Al-Karma
- Relegated: Samarra; Al-Shirqat; Al-Kufa; Al-Diwaniya

The 2023–24 Iraqi Premier Division League is the 50th season of the Iraqi Premier Division League, the second tier of the Iraqi football league system since its establishment in 1974, and the first under its new name.

22 teams are split into two groups in the first round, where the top four teams in each group qualify for the second round, and the bottom two teams in each group are directly relegated to the Iraqi First Division League.

In the second round, the eight teams are split into two groups, with each team playing the other teams in their group home and away. The two group winners qualify for the final and gain promotion to the Iraq Stars League, while the two group runners-up compete in a third place match, with the winner entering a promotion play-off.

== Team changes ==
The following teams have changed division since the 2022–23 season:

=== To Iraqi Premier Division League ===
Promoted from Iraqi First Division League

- Al-Fahad
- Al-Gharraf
- Al-Karma
- Ghaz Al-Shamal

Relegated from the Iraq Stars League

- Al-Diwaniya
- Al-Sinaa

=== From Iraqi Premier Division League ===
Promoted to the Iraq Stars League

- Al-Minaa
- Amanat Baghdad

Relegated to Iraqi First Division League

- Al-Hawija
- Al-Jinsiya
- Al-Samawa
- Al-Sulaikh

Withdrawn teams

- Al-Difaa Al-Madani
- Al-Muroor

== Teams ==
A total of 22 teams are contesting the league, including 16 sides from the 2022–23 season and the 2 relegated sides from the Iraq Stars League and the 4 promoted sides from the Iraqi First Division League, because of the recent changes necessary to adjustment to having 22 teams possible this season. Indeed, Al-Sinaa and Al-Diwaniya were relegated from the Stars League (known as the Premier League in the previous season), and the four teams Al-Karma, Ghaz Al-Shamal, Al-Gharraf and Al-Fahad were promoted from the First Division League (known as the Second Division League in the previous season). Al-Difaa Al-Madani and Al-Muroor were also considered to have withdrawn from the league after the Ministry of Interior officially dissolved them.

The teams were divided into two groups, and the draw was held on November 19, 2023, and it was decided that the championship will start on December 1, 2023.

=== 2023–24 season ===
Locations of the 2023–24 Iraqi Premier Division League teams

Team	Manager	Location	Stadium	Capacity
Afak	(Iraq) Adel Acher	Al-Qādisiyyah (Afak)	Al-Kifl Stadium	8,000
Al-Bahri	(Iraq) Qusay Hashim	Basra (Al-Jubaila)	Al-Bahri Stadium	7,000
Al-Diwaniya	(Iraq) Haider Abu Ajjah	Al-Qādisiyyah (Al-Diwaniyah)	Al-Kut Olympic Stadium	20,000
Al-Etisalat	(Iraq) Rashid Sultan	Baghdad (Al-Mansour)	Al-Taji Stadium	5,000
Al-Fahad	(Iraq) Anmar Salam	Al-Anbar (Al-Khalidiya)	Al-Ramadi Stadium	10,000
Al-Gharraf	(Iraq) Moayad Tauma	Dhi Qar (Al-Gharraf)	Al-Shatra Stadium	7,500
Al-Hussein	(Iraq) Haider Abdul-Zahra	Baghdad (Sadr City)	Five Thousand Stadium	5,000
Al-Jolan	(Iraq) Jumaa Jedaya	Al-Anbar (Al-Fallujah)	Al-Fallujah Stadium	7,000
Al-Karma	(Iraq) Haidar Mahmoud	Al-Anbar (Al-Karmah)	Al-Fallujah Stadium	7,000
Al-Kufa	(Iraq) Maitham Jaber	Najaf	Najaf Stadium	12,000
Al-Nasiriya	(Iraq) Haider Obeid	Dhi Qar (Nasiriyah)	An Nasiriya Stadium	10,000
Al-Ramadi	(Iraq) Mahmoud Majeed	Al-Anbar (Al-Ramadi)	Al Ramadi Stadium	10,000
Al-Sinaa	(Iraq) Safwan Abdul-Ghani	Baghdad (Al-Habibiya)	Al-Sinaa Stadium	10,000
Al-Sinaat Al-Kahrabaiya	(Iraq) Khalid Mohammed Sabbar	Baghdad (Al-Wazireya)	Al-Sinaa Stadium	10,000
Al-Shirqat	(Iraq) Farhan Hamad	Saladin (Al-Shirqat)	Al-Shirqat Stadium	5,000
Diyala	(Iraq) Sadeq Hanoon	Diyala (Baqubah)	Diyala Stadium	10,000
Ghaz Al-Shamal	(Iraq) Mustafa Karim	Kirkuk	Ghaz Al-Shamal Stadium	5,000
Masafi Al-Junoob	(Iraq) Uday Ismail	Basra (Shaibah)	Masafi Al-Junoob Stadium	5,000
Masafi Al-Wasat	(Iraq) Ali Wahab	Baghdad (Al-Dura)	Al-Masafi Stadium	5,000
Maysan	(Iraq) Mizher Rahim	Maysan	Maysan Stadium	25,000
Peshmerga Sulaymaniya	(Iraq) Ammar Hussein	Sulaymaniyah	Peshmerga Stadium	10,000
Samarra	(Iraq) Ayoub Younes	Saladin (Samarra)	Samarra Stadium	10,000

== First round ==
=== Group 1 ===
Pos	Team	Pld	W	D	L	GF	GA	GD	Pts	Qualification or relegation
1	Al-Karma	20	11	4	5	36	17	+19	37	Qualification for the Second Round
2	Peshmerga Sulaymaniya	20	9	9	2	30	16	+14	36	Qualification for the Second Round
3	Al-Nasiriya	20	8	8	4	26	18	+8	32	Qualification for the Second Round
4	Al-Etisalat	20	7	9	4	29	26	+3	30	Qualification for the Second Round
5	Masafi Al-Junoob	20	6	11	3	19	17	+2	29	
6	Al-Hussein	20	6	8	6	20	24	−4	26	
7	Maysan	20	6	8	6	17	21	−4	26	
8	Afak	20	6	6	8	28	26	+2	24	
9	Al-Fahad	20	6	6	8	28	29	−1	24	
10	Samarra	20	3	6	11	17	31	−14	15	Relegation to Iraqi First Division League
11	Al-Shirqat	20	2	5	13	14	39	−25	11	Relegation to Iraqi First Division League

Updated to match(es) played on 5 July 2024. Source: IFA official website
Rules for classification: 1) points; 2) head-to-head points; 3) head-to-head goal difference; 4) goal difference; 5) number of wins; 6) number of goals scored.

=== Group 2 ===
Pos	Team	Pld	W	D	L	GF	GA	GD	Pts	Qualification or relegation
1	Diyala	20	10	7	3	25	14	+11	37	Qualification for the Second Round
2	Al-Jolan	20	11	2	7	22	17	+5	35	Qualification for the Second Round
3	Masafi Al-Wasat	20	8	7	5	24	19	+5	31	Qualification for the Second Round
4	Al-Ramadi	20	8	7	5	24	20	+4	31	Qualification for the Second Round
5	Al-Sinaa	20	7	10	3	15	11	+4	31	
6	Al-Sinaat Al-Kahrabaiya	20	7	7	6	21	15	+6	28	
7	Al-Bahri	20	6	8	6	19	14	+5	26	
8	Al-Gharraf	20	6	7	7	18	16	+2	25	
9	Ghaz Al-Shamal	20	5	9	6	21	21	0	24	
10	Al-Kufa	20	3	6	11	15	32	−17	15	Relegation to Iraqi First Division League
11	Al-Diwaniya	20	2	4	14	9	34	−25	10	Relegation to Iraqi First Division League

Updated to match(es) played on 5 July 2024. Source: IFA official website
Rules for classification: 1) points; 2) head-to-head points; 3) head-to-head goal difference; 4) goal difference; 5) number of wins; 6) number of goals scored.

== Second round ==
=== Group 1 ===
Pos	Team	Pld	W	D	L	GF	GA	GD	Pts	Qualification or relegation
1	Al-Karma	6	5	0	1	13	4	+9	15	Qualification for the Iraq Stars League
2	Al-Ramadi	6	3	2	1	8	5	+3	11	Qualification for the play-out round
3	Al-Jolan	6	0	3	3	6	10	−4	3	
4	Al-Nasiriya	6	0	3	3	8	16	−8	3	

Updated to match(es) played on 5 July 2024. Source: IFA official website
Rules for classification: 1) points; 2) head-to-head points; 3) head-to-head goal difference; 4) goal difference; 5) number of wins; 6) number of goals scored.

=== Group 2 ===
Pos	Team	Pld	W	D	L	GF	GA	GD	Pts	Qualification or relegation
1	Diyala	6	3	2	1	5	2	+3	11	Qualification for the Iraq Stars League
2	Peshmerga Sulaymaniya	6	2	2	2	8	8	0	8	Qualification for the play-out round
3	Masafi Al-Wasat	6	1	4	1	5	5	0	7	
4	Al-Etisalat	6	1	2	3	4	7	−3	5	

Updated to match(es) played on 5 July 2024. Source: IFA official website
Rules for classification: 1) points; 2) head-to-head points; 3) head-to-head goal difference; 4) goal difference; 5) number of wins; 6) number of goals scored.

== Promotion play-offs ==
=== Play-out round ===
The second-placed teams in both groups of second round will compete in a play-off, with the loser remaining in Premier Division League and the winner advancing to the promotion play-off.

20 July 2024
17:30 UTC+3

Al-Ramadi	1–4	Peshmerga Sulaymaniya

Al-Zawraa Stadium, Baghdad

=== Promotion play-off ===
The winner of the play-out round will compete in a play-off with the loser from the play-out round of 17th and 18th-placed teams of the Iraq Stars League for a place in next season's Stars League.

24 July 2024
19:30 UTC+3

Al-Qasim	2–1	Peshmerga Sulaymaniya

Al-Zawraa Stadium, Baghdad

== Final ==
20 July 2024
17:30 UTC+3

Al-Karma	2–2	Diyala
Penalties
	6–7

Al-Shaab Stadium, Baghdad
