= 2024–25 Iraqi Premier Division League =

Iraqi Premier Division League
- Season: 2024–25
- Dates: 22 October 2024 – 3 July 2025
- Champions: Al-Mosul (3rd title)
- Promoted: Al-Mosul; Al-Gharraf; Amanat Baghdad
- Relegated: Al-Sinaa; Al-Sinaat Al-Kahrabaiya
- Matches: 380
- Goals: 794 (2.09 per match)

The 2024–25 Iraqi Premier Division League was the 51st season of the Iraqi Premier Division League, the second tier of the Iraqi football league system since its establishment in 1974, and the second under its new name. The season was originally set to begin on 11 October, but was delayed to 22 October to allow clubs to complete their preparations.

The 2024–25 season was played under a different format than the previous seasons, as teams are no longer separated into groups; instead the 20 teams played each other home and away in a double round-robin tournament.

== Summary ==
Al-Gharraf started the season strong, and went undefeated for eleven rounds before losing their first game to eventual champions Al-Mosul. Prior to the match, the Al-Gharraf team complained about lack of funds due to delays in receiving grants from the government. Supporters of the club raised 150 million IQD in order for the club to continue operating. Both clubs achieved promotion to the Iraq Stars League at the end of the season.

Former Iraqi top-flight champions Naft Al-Wasat also experienced severe financial difficulties, and the team was close to suffering back-to-back relegations, but survived after winning the relegation play-off. The club's issues culminated in them forfeiting a match against Maysan after not showing up to the game. On 18 January, Khalid Mohammed Sabbar resigned from managing Masafi Al-Wasat in order to take over at Naft Al-Wasat.

== Teams ==
=== Team changes ===
The following teams have changed division since the 2023–24 season:

Promoted from the Iraqi First Division League

- Al-Mosul
- Al-Kadhimiya

Relegated from the Iraq Stars League

- Amanat Baghdad
- Naft Al-Wasat

Promoted to the Iraq Stars League

- Diyala
- Al-Karma

Relegated to the Iraqi First Division League

- Samarra
- Al-Shirqat
- Al-Kufa
- Al-Diwaniya

=== Clubs and locations ===
Locations of the 2024–25 Iraqi Premier Division League teams

Team	Manager	Location	Stadium	Capacity
Afak	(Iraq) Aqeel Mohammed	Al-Qādisiyyah (Afak)	Al-Kifl Stadium	8,000
Al-Bahri	(Iraq) Ehsan Hadi	Basra (Al-Jubaila)	Al-Bahri Stadium	7,000
Al-Etisalat	(Iraq)	Baghdad (Al-Mansour)	Al-Taji Stadium	5,000
Al-Fahad	(Iraq) Natiq Hadad	Al-Anbar (Al-Khalidiya)	Al-Ramadi Stadium	10,000
Al-Gharraf	(Iraq) Muayad Tuama	Dhi Qar (Al-Gharraf)	Al-Shatra Stadium	7,500
Al-Hussein	(Iraq)	Baghdad (Sadr City)	Five Thousand Stadium	5,000
Al-Jolan	(Iraq) Osama Ali	Al-Anbar (Al-Fallujah)	Al-Fallujah Stadium	7,000
Al-Kadhimiya	(Iraq)	Baghdad	Al-Kadhimiya Stadium	5,000
Al-Mosul	(Iraq)	Nineveh	Mosul University Stadium	5,000
Al-Nasiriya	(Iraq) Thair Jassam	Dhi Qar (Nasiriyah)	An Nasiriya Stadium	10,000
Al-Ramadi	(Iraq) Safwan Abdul-Ghani	Al-Anbar (Al-Ramadi)	Al Ramadi Stadium	10,000
Al-Sinaa	(Iraq)	Baghdad (Al-Habibiya)	Al-Sinaa Stadium	10,000
Al-Sinaat Al-Kahrabaiya	(Iraq)	Baghdad (Al-Wazireya)	Al-Sinaa Stadium	5,000
Amanat Baghdad	(Iraq)	Baghdad (Al-Nahdha)	Amanat Baghdad Stadium	5,000
Ghaz Al-Shamal	(Iraq)	Kirkuk	Ghaz Al-Shamal Stadium	5,000
Masafi Al-Junoob	(Iraq) Nasser Talla	Basra (Shaibah)	Masafi Al-Junoob Stadium	5,000
Masafi Al-Wasat	(Iraq)	Baghdad (Al-Dura)	Al-Masafi Stadium	5,000
Maysan	(Iraq) Uday Ismail	Maysan	Maysan Stadium	25,000
Naft Al-Wasat	(Iraq) Khalid Mohammed Sabbar	Najaf	Al-Najaf International Stadium	30,000
Peshmerga Sulaymaniya	(Iraq)	Sulaymaniyah	Peshmerga Stadium	10,000

== League table ==
Pos	Team	Pld	W	D	L	GF	GA	GD	Pts	Promotion, qualification or relegation
1	Al-Mosul (C, P)	38	20	10	8	42	24	+18	70	Promotion to the Iraq Stars League
2	Al-Gharraf (P)	38	19	12	7	50	31	+19	69	Promotion to the Iraq Stars League
3	Al-Jolan	38	18	14	6	47	31	+16	68	Qualification for the play-out round
4	Amanat Baghdad (O, P)	38	18	13	7	40	24	+16	67	Qualification for the play-out round
5	Al-Kadhimiya	38	15	13	10	49	39	+10	58	
6	Al-Bahri	38	14	14	10	50	35	+15	56	
7	Masafi Al-Junoob	38	12	17	9	33	33	0	53	
8	Al-Fahad	38	12	15	11	42	36	+6	51	
9	Al-Hussein	38	10	19	9	42	36	+6	49	
10	Peshmerga Sulaymaniya	38	12	12	14	45	48	−3	48	
11	Maysan	38	10	17	11	41	46	−5	47	
12	Afak	38	10	16	12	40	43	−3	46	
13	Masafi Al-Wasat	38	12	10	16	46	47	−1	46	
14	Al-Ramadi	38	9	18	11	37	39	−2	45	
15	Ghaz Al-Shamal	38	9	17	12	34	38	−4	44	
16	Al-Etisalat	38	10	13	15	36	41	−5	43	
17	Al-Nasiriya	38	10	13	15	27	37	−10	43	
18	Naft Al-Wasat	38	8	18	12	28	32	−4	42	Qualification for the relegation play-off
19	Al-Sinaa (R)	38	11	9	18	38	48	−10	42	Relegation to the Iraqi First Division League
20	Al-Sinaat Al-Kahrabaiya (R)	38	2	8	28	27	86	−59	14	Relegation to the Iraqi First Division League

Source: IPFL
Rules for classification: 1) points; 2) head-to-head points; 3) head-to-head goal difference; 4) goal difference; 5) number of goals scored; 6) number of wins.
(C) Champions; (O) Play-off winners; (P) Promoted; (R) Relegated

== Promotion play-offs ==
=== Play-out round ===
The 3rd and 4th-placed teams compete in a play-off, with the winner advancing to the promotion play-off and the loser remaining in the Premier Division League.

If the scores are level after 90 minutes, 30 minutes of extra time are played. If the scores are still level after extra time, the 3rd-placed team advances to the promotion play-off due to their superior league position.

9 July 2025
19:00 UTC+3

Al-Jolan	1–3	Amanat Baghdad

Al-Zawraa Stadium, Baghdad

=== Promotion play-off ===
The winner of the play-out round competes in a play-off with the 18th-placed team from the Iraq Stars League for a place in next season's Stars League. If the match ends in a draw after 90 minutes, there is no extra time played and the game goes straight to a penalty shootout.

14 July 2025
20:00 UTC+3

Naft Al-Basra	0–1	Amanat Baghdad

Al-Shaab Stadium, Baghdad

== Relegation play-off ==
The 18th-placed team competes in a play-off with the 3rd-placed team from the First Division League for a place in next season's Premier Division League. If the match ends in a draw after 90 minutes, there is no extra time played and the game goes straight to a penalty shootout.

11 July 2025
17:00 UTC+3

Naft Al-Wasat	1–0	Al-Sufiya

Al-Shaab Stadium, Baghdad
