= 2023–24 Iraq FA Cup =

Tournament details
- Country: Iraq
- Dates: 26 January – 10 July 2024
- Teams: 42

Final positions
- Champions: Al-Shorta (1st title)
- Runners-up: Al-Quwa Al-Jawiya

Tournament statistics
- Matches played: 41
- Goals scored: 82 (2 per match)

The 2023–24 Iraq FA Cup was the 34th edition of the Iraqi knockout football cup as a club competition, the main domestic cup in Iraqi football. 42 clubs from the top two tiers of the Iraqi football league system participated in the competition.

The tournament began on 26 January 2024 with the first round between Iraqi Premier Division League clubs and the lower-placed Iraq Stars League clubs, with a further four Iraq Stars League clubs entering the competition in the second round, and the top six Iraq Stars League clubs receiving a bye to the Round of 16. The final was played on 10 July 2024 at Al-Shaab Stadium in Baghdad.

The winners of the competition were Al-Shorta, who won their first title with a 1–0 victory over Al-Quwa Al-Jawiya.

== Schedule ==
The rounds of the 2023–24 competition are scheduled as follows:

Round	Fixtures draw date	Stadiums draw date	Match dates
First round	10 January 2024		26–27 January 2024
Second round	28 January 2024		3–4 February 2024
Round of 16	27 February 2024		12–14 March 2024
Quarter-finals	27 February 2024	31 March 2024	9 April 2024
Semi-finals	27 February 2024	—	7 July 2024
Final	27 February 2024	—	10 July 2024

== First round ==
This round features 10 teams from the Stars League (level 1) and 22 teams from the Premier Division League (level 2). Naft Maysan, Al-Najaf, Karbala and Duhok received byes to the second round.

26 January 2024	Al-Naft (1)	2–0	Al-Hussein (2)	Baghdad
14:00 UTC+3	Afolabi; Hussein			Stadium: Amanat Baghdad Stadium

26 January 2024	Al-Minaa (1)	3–0 (w/o)	Al-Diwaniya (2)	Basra
14:00 UTC+3				Stadium: Al-Minaa Olympic Stadium

26 January 2024	Newroz (1)	4–1	Al-Etisalat (2)	Sulaymaniya
14:00 UTC+3	Hussein; Kurdistan; Omar		Goal	Stadium: Sulaymaniya Stadium

26 January 2024	Samarra (2)	1–1 (4–5 p)	Amanat Baghdad (1)	Samarra
14:00 UTC+3	Al-Fateeh		Goal	Stadium: Samarra Stadium

26 January 2024	Al-Hudood (1)	1–1 (5–4 p)	Ghaz Al-Shamal (2)	Baghdad
14:00 UTC+3	Goal		Khalaf 88' (pen.)	Stadium: Al-Saher Ahmed Radhi Stadium

26 January 2024	Al-Shirqat (2)	1–1 (5–6 p)	Al-Fahad (2)	Al-Shirqat
14:00 UTC+3	Hamad		Juma	Stadium: Al-Shirqat Stadium

26 January 2024	Al-Ramadi (2)	0–1	Al-Karkh (1)	Ramadi
14:00 UTC+3			Goumey	Stadium: Al-Ramadi Stadium

26 January 2024	Al-Nasiriya (2)	0–0 (2–4 p)	Naft Al-Wasat (1)	Al-Shatra
14:00 UTC+3				Stadium: Al-Shatra Stadium

27 January 2024	Al-Bahri (2)	0–0 (2–4 p)	Zakho (1)	Basra
14:00 UTC+3				Stadium: Al-Bahri Stadium

27 January 2024	Al-Qasim (1)	2–0	Al-Jolan (2)	Karbala
14:00 UTC+3	Mhaisen; Ayad			Stadium: Karbala International Stadium

27 January 2024	Naft Al-Basra (1)	1–1 (5–4 p)	Masafi Al-Wasat (2)	Basra
14:00 UTC+3				Stadium: Al-Minaa Olympic Stadium

27 January 2024	Afak (2)	2–1	Al-Sinaa (2)	Afak
14:00 UTC+3				Stadium: Afak Stadium

27 January 2024	Diyala (2)	1–2	Masafi Al-Junoob (2)	Diyala
14:00 UTC+3	Goal		Jabbar; Mohammed	Stadium: Diyala Stadium

27 January 2024	Peshmerga Sulaymaniya (2)	1–0	Al-Sinaat Al-Kahrabaiya (2)	Sulaymaniya
14:00 UTC+3				Stadium: Peshmerga Stadium

27 January 2024	Al-Gharraf (2)	1–1 (2–4 p)	Al-Kufa (2)	Al-Shatra
14:00 UTC+3	90+4'		Wadhah 47'	Stadium: Al-Shatra Stadium

27 January 2024	Maysan (2)	2–3	Al-Karma (2)	Maysan
14:00 UTC+3	Goal		Raheem; Dybal; Santos	Stadium: Shohada Maysan Stadium

== Second round ==
This round features 14 teams from the Stars League (level 1) and 6 teams from the Premier Division League (level 2). Al-Shorta, Al-Quwa Al-Jawiya, Al-Zawraa, Al-Talaba, Al-Kahrabaa and Erbil received byes to the Round of 16.

3 February 2024	Al-Kufa (2)	0–2	Al-Karkh (1)	Najaf
14:00 UTC+3	Penalty missed		Goumey (red card); Talla; Ghani	Stadium: Al-Najaf Secondary Stadium

3 February 2024	Afak (2)	0–2	Zakho (1)	Afak
14:00 UTC+3			Attwan 60', 73'	Stadium: Afak Stadium

3 February 2024	Al-Naft (1)	1–0	Peshmerga Sulaymaniya (2)	Baghdad
14:00 UTC+3	Hussein			Stadium: Amanat Baghdad Stadium

3 February 2024	Al-Qasim (1)	1–2	Newroz (1)	Karbala
14:00 UTC+3	Goal		Kurdistan; Hussein	Stadium: Karbala International Stadium

3 February 2024	Al-Fahad (2)	1–3	Al-Hudood (1)	Ramadi
14:00 UTC+3	Goal		Ghazi; Dacosta	Stadium: Al-Ramadi Stadium

3 February 2024	Al-Minaa (1)	3–1	Naft Al-Wasat (1)	Basra
14:00 UTC+3	Abed Farhan 22'; Ahmed 49'; Ali 65'		70'	Stadium: Al-Minaa Olympic Stadium

3 February 2024	Duhok (1)	1–1 (6–7 p)	Naft Maysan (1)	Duhok
14:00 UTC+3	Goal		Kuku	Stadium: Duhok Stadium

4 February 2024	Karbala (1)	2–1	Masafi Al-Junoob (2)	Karbala
14:00 UTC+3	Mohammed		Goal	Stadium: Karbala International Stadium

4 February 2024	Amanat Baghdad (1)	1–1 (3–5 p)	Al-Karma (2)	Baghdad
14:00 UTC+3	Goal		Naji	Stadium: Amanat Baghdad Stadium

4 February 2024	Naft Al-Basra (1)	1–2	Al-Najaf (1)	Basra
14:00 UTC+3	12'		Adnan 78'; Qasim 89'	Stadium: Al-Minaa Olympic Stadium

== Final phase ==
=== Bracket ===
Round of 16; 12–14 March 2024
Al-Minaa	1
Al-Hudood	0
Zakho	0 (3)
Al-Shorta (p)	0 (4)
Al-Talaba	0 (4)
Al-Naft (p)	0 (5)
Al-Karkh	0
Erbil	1
Al-Najaf	0 (7)
Al-Quwa Al-Jawiya (p)	0 (8)
Naft Maysan	1
Al-Karma	0
Al-Zawraa (p)	1 (4)
Karbala	1 (2)
Al-Kahrabaa	1
Newroz	2

Quarter-finals; 9 April 2024
Al-Minaa	0
Al-Shorta	2
Al-Naft (p)	1 (3)
Erbil	1 (0)
Al-Quwa Al-Jawiya	3
Naft Maysan	0
Al-Zawraa	3
Newroz	0

Semi-finals; 7 July 2024
Al-Shorta	1
Al-Naft	0
Al-Quwa Al-Jawiya	1
Al-Zawraa	0

Final; 10 July 2024
Al-Shorta	1
Al-Quwa Al-Jawiya	0

== Round of 16 ==
This round features 15 teams from the Stars League (level 1) and 1 team from the Premier Division League (level 2).

12 March 2024	Naft Maysan (1)	1–0	Al-Karma (2)	Maysan
14:30 UTC+3	Al Dali 40' (pen.)			Stadium: Maysan Olympic Stadium

12 March 2024	Al-Kahrabaa (1)	1–2	Newroz (1)	Baghdad
21:30 UTC+3	Aminu 59'		Maradona 64'; Sami 65'	Stadium: Al-Zawraa Stadium

13 March 2024	Zakho (1)	0–0 (3–4 p)	Al-Shorta (1)	Zakho
21:30 UTC+3				Stadium: Zakho International Stadium
	Penalties
	Dione (penalty missed); Mohammedoh (penalty scored); Cédric (penalty scored); Kabwe (penalty missed); Attwan (penalty scored); Patrick (penalty missed)		(penalty missed) Al-Mawas; (penalty scored) Santos; (penalty scored) Husni; (penalty missed) Sabah; (penalty scored) Al-Youssef; (penalty scored) Jassim

13 March 2024	Al-Zawraa (1)	1–1 (4–2 p)	Karbala (1)	Baghdad
21:30 UTC+3	Abboud 76'		Ouattara 22'	Stadium: Al-Zawraa Stadium

13 March 2024	Al-Talaba (1)	0–0 (4–5 p)	Al-Naft (1)	Baghdad
21:30 UTC+3				Stadium: Al-Shaab Stadium

13 March 2024	Al-Najaf (1)	0–0 (7–8 p)	Al-Quwa Al-Jawiya (1)	Najaf
21:30 UTC+3				Stadium: Al-Najaf International Stadium

14 March 2024	Al-Karkh (1)	0–1	Erbil (1)	Baghdad
14:30 UTC+3			Mohsen 26'	Stadium: Al-Saher Ahmed Radhi Stadium

14 March 2024	Al-Minaa (1)	1–0	Al-Hudood (1)	Basra
21:30 UTC+3	Ahmed 23'			Stadium: Al-Minaa Olympic Stadium

== Quarter-finals ==
All remaining teams are from the Stars League (level 1).

9 April 2024	Al-Minaa	0–2	Al-Shorta	Basra
21:30 UTC+3	Jafar (yellow card) (yellow-red card) 90+4'		Ali 12'; Younis (red card) 14'; Jassim 89' (pen.)	Stadium: Al-Minaa Olympic Stadium

9 April 2024	Al-Naft	1–1 (3–0 p)	Erbil	Baghdad
21:30 UTC+3	Afolabi 17' (pen.)		Samia 85'	Stadium: Al-Madina Stadium

9 April 2024	Al-Quwa Al-Jawiya	3–0	Naft Maysan	Baghdad
21:30 UTC+3	Jabbar 8'; Hussein 27'; Jasim 59'			Stadium: Al-Shaab Stadium

9 April 2024	Al-Zawraa	3–0	Newroz	Baghdad
21:30 UTC+3	John 16'; Abdulkareem 56'; Abbas 90+3'			Stadium: Al-Zawraa Stadium

== Semi-finals ==
7 July 2024	Al-Shorta	1–0	Al-Naft	Baghdad
20:00 UTC+3	Ali 60'			Stadium: Al-Zawraa Stadium

7 July 2024	Al-Quwa Al-Jawiya	1–0	Al-Zawraa	Baghdad
20:00 UTC+3	Saadoun 83'			Stadium: Al-Shaab Stadium

== Final ==
10 July 2024
20:00 UTC+3

Al-Shorta	1–0	Al-Quwa Al-Jawiya
Santos 59'; Abdul-Zahra (yellow card) 85' (yellow-red card) 87'

Al-Shaab Stadium, Baghdad
Referee: Ilgiz Tantashev (Uzbekistan)

Iraq FA Cup
2023–24 winner
Al-Shorta
1st title
