= 2025–26 Iraq Stars League =

52nd season of the Iraq Stars League

Iraq Stars League
- Season: 2025–26
- Dates: 13 September 2025 – 2 June 2026
- Champions: Al-Quwa Al-Jawiya (8th title)
- Relegated: Amanat Baghdad; Al-Najaf; Al-Qasim
- AFC Champions League Elite: Al-Quwa Al-Jawiya
- AFC Champions League Two: Al-Shorta
- GFF Gulf Club Champions League: Erbil; Al-Zawraa
- Matches: 380
- Goals: 932 (2.45 per match)
- Top goalscorer: Sherzod Temirov (28 goals)
- Biggest home win: Zakho 4–0 Newroz (4 October 2025); Al-Karma 4–0 Al-Kahrabaa (25 October 2025); Al-Minaa 4–0 Amanat Baghdad (21 April 2026)
- Biggest away win: Al-Qasim 1–7 Al-Shorta (8 January 2026)
- Highest scoring: Al-Qasim 1–7 Al-Shorta (8 January 2026)
- Longest winning run: 11 matches Al-Quwa Al-Jawiya
- Longest unbeaten run: 24 matches Al-Quwa Al-Jawiya
- Longest winless run: 38 matches Al-Qasim
- Longest losing run: 26 matches Al-Qasim

The 2025–26 Iraq Stars League was the 52nd season of the highest tier football league in Iraq since its establishment in 1974, and the third season since launching as a professional league under the name Iraq Stars League. The season started on 13 September 2025 and ended on 2 June 2026, with the relegation play-off held from 8–13 June 2026.

Al-Quwa Al-Jawiya won the league title for the eighth time, securing the title with a 2–0 win away to Naft Maysan in the penultimate round of the season. Four-time defending champions Al-Shorta finished as runners-up, with Erbil securing third place.

Al-Quwa Al-Jawiya equalled the league record of eleven consecutive matches won (first achieved by Al-Shorta in the 1997–98 season) on their way to the title.

== Overview ==
20 teams competed in the 2025–26 Iraq Stars League: 17 teams from the previous season, as well as Al-Mosul, Al-Gharraf and Amanat Baghdad who were promoted from the 2024–25 Iraqi Premier Division League, replacing Naft Al-Basra, Al-Hudood and Karbala who were relegated. Al-Mosul returned to the top flight after a 14-year absence, while Amanat Baghdad returned after a one-year absence. Al-Gharraf played in the top flight for the first time in history this season.

== Teams ==
Locations of teams in the 2025–26 Iraq Stars League

=== Clubs and locations ===
Team	Manager	Location	Stadium	Capacity
Al-Gharraf	(Iraq) Qahtan Chathir	Dhi Qar (Al-Gharraf)	Al-Nasiriya International Stadium	20,000
Al-Kahrabaa	(Iraq) Hassan Ahmed	Baghdad (Al-Wazireya Al-Sinaaiya)	Al-Zawraa Stadium	15,443
Al-Karkh	(Syria) Ayman Hakeem	Baghdad (Al-Mansour)	Sharar Haidar Stadium	5,150
Al-Karma	(Egypt) Moamen Soliman	Anbar (Al-Karma)	Al-Jolan Stadium	6,000
Al-Minaa	(Iraq) Hussein Abdul-Wahed	Basra (Maqal)	Al-Minaa Olympic Stadium	30,000
Al-Mosul	(Jordan) Haitham Al-Shboul	Mosul	Duhok Stadium	22,800
Al-Naft	(Iraq) Adel Nima	Baghdad (Shaab)	Sharar Haidar Stadium	5,150
Al-Najaf	(Iraq) Samer Saeed	Najaf	Al-Najaf International Stadium	30,000
Al-Qasim	(Iraq) Hassan Hadi	Babil (Al-Qasim)	Al-Najaf International Stadium	30,000
Al-Quwa Al-Jawiya	(Oman) Rashid Jaber	Baghdad (Zayouna)	Al-Shaab Stadium	35,700
Al-Shorta	(Iraq) Ahmed Salah	Baghdad (Al-Rusafa)	Al-Shorta Stadium	10,089
Al-Talaba	(Iran) Alireza Mansourian	Baghdad (Hayy Qahira)	Al-Madina Stadium	32,000
Al-Zawraa	(Iraq) Luay Salah	Baghdad (Sheikh Maaruf, Al-Shaljiya)	Al-Zawraa Stadium	15,443
Amanat Baghdad	(Iraq) Wissam Talib	Baghdad (Al-Nahdha)	Al-Madina Stadium	32,000
Diyala	(Tunisia) Yamen Zelfani	Diyala (Baquba)	Diyala Stadium	10,000
Duhok	(Iraq) Ahmed Khalaf	Duhok	Duhok Stadium	22,800
Erbil	(Iraq) Basim Qasim	Erbil	Franso Hariri Stadium	25,000
Naft Maysan	(Iraq) Ali Abdul-Jabbar	Maysan (Amara)	Maysan Olympic Stadium	25,000
Newroz	(Iraq) Wali Kareem	Sulaymaniya	Newroz Stadium	14,500
Zakho	(Iraq) Abdul-Ghani Shahad	Duhok (Zakho)	Zakho International Stadium	20,000

=== Managerial changes ===
Team	Outgoing manager	Manner of departure	Date of vacancy	Position in the table	Incoming manager	Date of appointment
Al-Qasim	(Iraq) Wamidh Munir	Resigned	16 September 2025	20th	(Iraq) Hassan Hadi	23 September 2025
Duhok	(Brazil) Sérgio Farias	Mutual consent	23 September 2025	18th	(Iraq) Abdul-Ghani Shahad	14 October 2025
Al-Zawraa	(Iraq) Abdul-Ghani Shahad	Mutual consent	6 October 2025	16th	(Egypt) Emad El Nahhas	11 October 2025
Naft Maysan	(Jordan) Abdullah Abu Zema	Mutual consent	7 October 2025	15th	(Iraq) Hassan Ahmed	13 October 2025
Al-Karma	(Iraq) Ahmed Khalaf	Sacked	13 October 2025	8th	(Spain) Antonio Cazorla	13 October 2025
Al-Najaf	(Egypt) Mohamed Azima	Sacked	15 October 2025	19th	(Iraq) Ali Abdul-Jabbar	15 October 2025
Newroz	(Sweden) Yasin Aras	Sacked	26 October 2025	16th	(Iraq) Wali Kareem	28 October 2025
Al-Kahrabaa	(Iraq) Radhi Shenaishil	Resigned	26 October 2025	19th	(Iraq) Ahmed Abdul-Jabar	28 October 2025
Al-Talaba	(Qatar) Talal Al-Bloushi	Mutual consent	8 November 2025	11th	(Iran) Alireza Mansourian	28 November 2025
Amanat Baghdad	(Iraq) Essam Hamad	Resigned	9 November 2025	15th	(Iraq) Ahmed Khalaf	28 November 2025
Al-Najaf	(Iraq) Ali Abdul-Jabbar	Resigned	24 January 2026	19th	(Iraq) Qahtan Chathir	25 January 2026
Al-Qasim	(Iraq) Hassan Hadi	Sacked	26 January 2026	20th	(Iraq) Haidar Aboodi	1 February 2026
Al-Mosul	(Iraq) Chasib Sultan	Sacked	28 January 2026	15th	(Jordan) Haitham Al-Shboul	28 January 2026
Zakho	(Qatar) Wesam Rizik	Sacked	13 February 2026	8th	(Iraq) Ayoub Odisho	13 February 2026
Al-Najaf	(Iraq) Qahtan Chathir	Resigned	20 February 2026	19th	(Iraq) Chasib Sultan	3 March 2026
Al-Minaa	(Iraq) Luay Salah	Resigned	22 February 2026	15th	(Iraq) Hussein Abdul-Wahed	27 February 2026
Al-Zawraa	(Egypt) Emad El Nahhas	Mutual consent	24 February 2026	6th	(Iraq) Luay Salah	25 February 2026
Naft Maysan	(Iraq) Hassan Ahmed	Sacked	24 February 2026	17th	(Iraq) Ali Abdul-Jabbar	25 February 2026
Al-Karma	(Spain) Antonio Cazorla	Sacked	2 March 2026	3rd	(Iraq) Essam Hamad	3 March 2026
Amanat Baghdad	(Iraq) Ahmed Khalaf	Resigned	7 March 2026	15th	(Iraq) Wissam Talib	7 March 2026
Al-Qasim	(Iraq) Haidar Aboodi	Resigned	11 March 2026	20th	(Iraq) Hassan Hadi	11 March 2026
Duhok	(Iraq) Abdul-Ghani Shahad	Resigned	19 March 2026	9th	(Iraq) Ahmed Khalaf	19 March 2026
Al-Gharraf	(Iraq) Haider Obeid	Resigned	20 March 2026	10th	(Iraq) Qahtan Chathir	23 March 2026
Al-Najaf	(Iraq) Chasib Sultan	Resigned	5 April 2026	19th	(Iraq) Samer Saeed	5 April 2026
Al-Shorta	(Egypt) Moamen Soliman	Mutual consent	27 April 2026	2nd	(Iraq) Ahmed Salah	27 April 2026
Al-Kahrabaa	(Iraq) Ahmed Abdul-Jabar	Resigned	28 April 2026	17th	(Iraq) Hassan Ahmed	28 April 2026
Al-Karma	(Iraq) Essam Hamad	Sacked	1 May 2026	6th	(Egypt) Moamen Soliman	2 May 2026
Zakho	(Iraq) Ayoub Odisho	Resigned	16 May 2026	8th	(Iraq) Abdul-Ghani Shahad	18 May 2026

== League table ==
Pos	Team	Pld	W	D	L	GF	GA	GD	Pts	Qualification or relegation
1	Al-Quwa Al-Jawiya (C)	38	27	8	3	62	28	+34	89	Qualification for the AFC Champions League Elite league stage
2	Al-Shorta	38	25	7	6	71	29	+42	82	Qualification for the AFC Champions League Two group stage
3	Erbil	38	23	10	5	59	32	+27	79	Qualification for the GFF Gulf Club Champions League group stage
4	Al-Zawraa	38	17	15	6	50	32	+18	66	Qualification for the GFF Gulf Club Champions League group stage
5	Al-Karma	38	17	14	7	53	26	+27	65 (Note: Al-Karma finished ahead of Al-Talaba on overall goal difference: Al-Karma +27, Al-Talaba +15. The two teams were tied on head-to-head points and goal difference: Al-Karma 1–1 Al-Talaba, Al-Talaba 1–1 Al-Karma.)	
6	Al-Talaba	38	18	11	9	53	38	+15	65	
7	Al-Karkh	38	16	12	10	51	41	+10	60	
8	Newroz	38	16	6	16	48	47	+1	54	
9	Zakho	38	14	11	13	49	45	+4	53	
10	Duhok	38	13	11	14	44	45	−1	50	
11	Al-Naft	38	11	15	12	33	34	−1	48 (Note: Al-Naft finished ahead of Diyala on overall goal difference: Al-Naft –1, Diyala –7. The two teams were tied on head-to-head points and goal difference: Al-Naft 2–1 Diyala, Diyala 1–0 Al-Naft.)	
12	Diyala	38	13	9	16	39	46	−7	48	
13	Al-Mosul	38	11	14	13	46	49	−3	47	
14	Al-Gharraf	38	11	11	16	40	43	−3	44	
15	Al-Minaa	38	10	12	16	41	47	−6	42 (Note: Al-Minaa finished ahead of Naft Maysan on head-to-head goal difference: Naft Maysan 1–3 Al-Minaa, Al-Minaa 0–1 Naft Maysan.)	
16	Naft Maysan	38	11	9	18	46	58	−12	42	
17	Al-Kahrabaa	38	12	5	21	47	56	−9	41	
18	Amanat Baghdad (R)	38	10	7	21	47	68	−21	37	Qualification for the relegation play-off
19	Al-Najaf (R)	38	7	4	27	33	70	−37	25	Relegation to the Iraqi Premier Division League
20	Al-Qasim (R)	38	0	5	33	20	98	−78	5	Relegation to the Iraqi Premier Division League

Source: SofaScore
Rules for classification: 1) Points; 2) Head-to-head points; 3) Head-to-head goal difference; 4) Goal difference; 5) Number of goals scored; 6) Number of wins.
(C) Champions; (R) Relegated

== Results ==
Home \ Away	GHA	KAH	KKH	KRM	MIN	MSL	NFT	NJF	QSM	QWJ	SHR	TLB	ZWR	AMN	DYL	DHK	ERB	NFM	NEW	ZAK
Al-Gharraf		3–1	2–2	0–1	0–1	1–0	2–0	1–0	0–0	1–2	0–1	1–3	0–1	3–2	0–0	4–3	0–0	0–2	0–1	0–0
Al-Kahrabaa	2–2		1–3	0–3	2–0	0–1	1–2	3–0 (Note: The Al-Kahrabaa–Al-Najaf match was awarded as a 3–0 win to Al-Kahrabaa, as the referee had ended the match during the first half while the score was 0–0 after being subject to attacks by Al-Najaf players and staff following a VAR decision.)	3–0	2–3	0–1	1–2	0–1	1–0	1–2	1–1	0–0	1–3	2–1	0–3
Al-Karkh	1–0	1–1		0–0	1–0	2–2	2–2	2–0	2–1	0–1	0–2	0–2	3–1	2–1	0–2	0–1	1–1	1–1	3–0	3–1
Al-Karma	3–0	4–0	1–1		2–0	1–1	2–1	2–0	1–0	3–0	1–1	1–1	0–0	2–1	1–0	3–0	2–3	3–0	0–1	0–0
Al-Minaa	0–1	1–2	0–2	2–0		1–0	0–0	4–2	2–0	0–2	1–1	1–1	0–2	4–0	1–1	1–1	1–3	0–1	1–1	2–2
Al-Mosul	1–1	2–1	1–2	1–3	2–1		0–0	2–1	3–0 (Note: The Al-Mosul–Al-Qasim match was awarded as a 3–0 win to Al-Mosul, as Al-Qasim did not turn up for the game.)	0–1	0–1	2–2	1–3	1–1	0–3 (Note: The Al-Mosul–Diyala match originally ended in a 2–2 draw but was changed to a 3–0 win for Diyala due to Al-Mosul fielding seven foreign players on the field at the same time, which exceeded the maximum number of foreign players allowed to be on the field at one time (six players).)	3–3	0–2	1–1	0–2	2–0
Al-Naft	1–0	1–0	0–1	0–0	1–1	1–2		1–1	2–0	0–0	1–1	3–0 (Note: The Al-Naft–Al-Talaba match originally ended in a 0–0 draw but was changed to a 3–0 win for Al-Naft due to Al-Talaba player Mustafa Maan wearing a different shirt number (34) than he was registered with for the match (32).)	0–0	3–0	2–1	1–1	0–2	1–2	2–1	1–1
Al-Najaf	0–3	1–2	2–5	0–3	0–1	1–2	0–0		3–0 (Note: The Al-Najaf–Al-Qasim match originally ended in a 1–1 draw but was changed to a 3–0 win for Al-Najaf due to Al-Qasim violating the rules by making late changes to their lineup within the submission system.)	0–2	1–3	1–0	1–0	1–1	0–1	1–2	1–4	2–4	2–1	1–2
Al-Qasim	1–5	0–3 (Note: The Al-Qasim–Al-Kahrabaa match was awarded as a 3–0 win to Al-Kahrabaa, as Al-Qasim started the game with only eight players and had two of their players go off injured after eleven minutes while Al-Kahrabaa were leading 2–0.)	0–3	2–2	3–3	2–3	0–3	1–2		0–5	1–7	0–3	0–2	0–1	0–4	0–3	0–2	2–5	0–3	0–1
Al-Quwa Al-Jawiya	1–1	2–0	1–0	1–0	1–0	2–1	0–0	2–0	2–0		1–1	2–1	2–1	3–1	2–1	0–2	1–1	2–1	2–1	3–2
Al-Shorta	1–0	2–0	3–0	1–0	0–0	3–0	1–0	2–1	3–1	3–3		3–3	1–2	4–1	3–0 (Note: The Al-Shorta–Diyala match originally ended in a 2–1 win for Al-Shorta but was changed to a 3–0 win for the same team due to Diyala fielding seven foreign players on the field at the same time, which exceeded the maximum number of foreign players allowed to be on the field at one time (six players).)	2–0	0–2	2–1	3–2	1–0
Al-Talaba	3–1	2–0	1–1	1–1	1–2	0–0	0–0	2–1	2–0	1–2	1–0		0–1	2–1	1–1	2–1	2–3	2–1	2–2	1–0
Al-Zawraa	0–0	1–0	3–0	0–0	2–0	1–1	0–1	2–0	1–1	0–2	1–2	1–1		3–2	2–0	2–2	1–0	1–1	2–1	4–2
Amanat Baghdad	1–3	0–5	1–1	2–1	0–0	0–3	1–2	0–1	2–2	0–2	2–1	2–1	2–2		1–2	2–1	3–0 (Note: The Amanat Baghdad–Erbil match originally ended in a 1–1 draw but was changed to a 3–0 win for Amanat Baghdad due to Erbil fielding seven foreign players on the field at the same time, which exceeded the maximum number of foreign players allowed to be on the field at one time (six players).)	4–1	0–2	3–0 (Note: The Amanat Baghdad–Zakho match originally ended in a 2–1 win for Zakho but was changed to a 3–0 win for Amanat Baghdad due to Zakho violating the rules by making late changes to their lineup within the submission system.)
Diyala	1–1	0–2	1–0	1–1	0–3 (Note: The Diyala–Al-Minaa match originally ended in a 0–0 draw but was changed to a 3–0 win for Al-Minaa due to Diyala violating the rules by making late changes to their lineup within the submission system.)	1–4	1–0	1–2	3–0	0–1	0–2	0–1	1–1	1–4		1–0	1–1	1–0	1–1	2–1
Duhok	1–1	1–2	2–3	0–1	1–0	0–0	0–0	1–0	2–1	1–2	2–1	1–0	0–0	1–0	1–0		0–2	2–1	1–2	0–1
Erbil	2–1	2–2	1–0	2–1	3–2	2–2	3–1	3–2	2–0	0–0	1–0	0–2	1–1	3–1	2–0	2–1		1–0	0–1	0–1
Naft Maysan	0–1	0–2	1–2	1–1	1–3	1–1	3–0	2–1	2–1	0–2	0–3 (Note: The Naft Maysan–Al-Shorta match originally ended in a 2–2 draw but was changed to a 3–0 win for Al-Shorta due to Naft Maysan including the Yemeni player Ahmed Al-Sarori in their matchday squad, who had not played for his national team in each of the previous three years and was therefore ineligible per the squad registration rules.)	0–1	2–2	2–1	1–1	2–2	0–0		2–1	0–2
Newroz	2–1	3–2	0–0	0–1	4–1	1–1	2–0	2–0	2–1	1–1	0–3	0–1	1–2	0–1	2–1	0–2	0–1	2–0		2–1
Zakho	2–0	2–1	1–1	2–2	1–1	1–0	2–0	1–1	1–0	2–1	0–2	1–2	1–1	2–2	1–2	1–1	1–2	3–1	4–0	

Source: SofaScore
Legend: Blue = home team win; Yellow = draw; Red = away team win.
For upcoming matches, an "a" indicates there is an article about the rivalry between the two participants.

== Relegation play-off ==
The 18th-placed team in the Stars League competed in a two-legged play-off with the winner of the play-out round between the 3rd and 4th-placed teams from the Premier Division League for a place in next season's Stars League. If the tie ended in a draw on aggregate, there would be no extra time played and the game would go straight to a penalty shootout.

8 June 2026
18:30 UTC+3

Amanat Baghdad	0–1	Karbala
		Turky 90'

Diyala Stadium, Diyala
Referee: Ahmed Kadhim
13 June 2026
18:30 UTC+3

Karbala	1–0	Amanat Baghdad
Kadiri 10'

Karbala International Stadium, Karbala
Referee: Ali Hussein Ali

Karbala won 2–0 on aggregate.
Karbala are promoted to Iraq Stars League, while Amanat Baghdad are relegated to the Iraqi Premier Division League.

== Season statistics ==
=== Top scorers ===
Rank	Player	Club	Goals
1	(Uzbekistan) Sherzod Temirov	Erbil	28
2	(Syria) Alaa Al Dali	Al-Mosul	20
3	(Iraq) Peter Gwargis	Duhok	19
4	(Iraq) Younis Hamoud	Al-Karkh	18
5	(Nigeria) Kingsley Fidelis Kuku	Al-Gharraf	17
5	(Cameroon) Leonel Ateba	Al-Shorta	17

==== Hat-tricks ====
Player	For	Against	Result	Date	Reference
(Cameroon) Leonel Ateba	Al-Shorta	Al-Karkh	3–0 (H)	20 November 2025	
(Nigeria) Kingsley Fidelis Kuku	Al-Gharraf	Amanat Baghdad	3–2 (H)	26 January 2026	
(Brazil) Lucas Santos	Al-Kahrabaa	Amanat Baghdad	5–0 (A)	22 February 2026	
(Uzbekistan) Sherzod Temirov	Erbil	Al-Minaa	3–2 (H)	13 March 2026	
(Syria) Yassin Samia	Al-Minaa	Amanat Baghdad	4–0 (H)	21 April 2026	
(Syria) Alaa Al Dali^{4}	Al-Mosul	Diyala	4–0 (A)	26 April 2026	
(Iraq) Younis Hamoud^{4}	Al-Karkh	Al-Najaf	5–2 (A)	20 May 2026	

Notes

^{4} Player scored 4 goals
(H) – Home team
(A) – Away team

== Awards ==
=== Manager of the Month ===
Month	Manager	Team	Reference
October	(Iraq) Basim Qasim	Erbil	
November	(Iraq) Chasib Sultan	Al-Mosul	
December	(Iraq) Abdul-Ghani Shahad	Duhok	
January	(Spain) Antonio Cazorla	Al-Karma	
February	(Oman) Rashid Jaber	Al-Quwa Al-Jawiya	
March	(Iraq) Wali Kareem	Newroz	
April	(Iraq) Luay Salah	Al-Zawraa	
May	(Oman) Rashid Jaber	Al-Quwa Al-Jawiya	
