= 2023–24 Iraq Stars League =

50th season of the Iraq Stars League

Iraq Stars League
- Season: 2023–24
- Dates: 26 October 2023 – 14 July 2024
- Champions: Al-Shorta (7th title)
- Relegated: Amanat Baghdad; Naft Al-Wasat
- AFC Champions League Elite: Al-Shorta
- AFC Champions League Two: Al-Quwa Al-Jawiya
- AGCFF Gulf Club Champions League: Duhok
- Matches: 380
- Goals: 872 (2.29 per match)
- Best Player: Mahmoud Al-Mawas
- Top goalscorer: Aymen Hussein (27 goals)
- Highest scoring: Karbala 3–5 Erbil (19 February 2024); Al-Shorta 4–4 Newroz (4 May 2024); Duhok 4–4 Al-Minaa (1 July 2024); Newroz 4–4 Erbil (14 July 2024)
- Longest winning run: 8 matches Al-Zawraa
- Longest unbeaten run: 23 matches Al-Shorta
- Longest winless run: 31 matches Naft Al-Wasat
- Longest losing run: 5 matches Al-Qasim; Naft Al-Wasat

The 2023–24 Iraq Stars League was the 50th season of the highest tier football league in Iraq since its establishment in 1974, and the first season since launching as a professional league under the name Iraq Stars League. The season started on 26 October 2023 and ended on 14 July 2024, with the post-season play-offs held from 19–24 July 2024.

Al-Shorta won the league title for the third season in a row, sealing the title in the penultimate round of the season by defeating Duhok 1–0. Al-Shorta also won the Iraq FA Cup title to secure the domestic double.

== Overview ==
20 teams competed in the 2023–24 Iraq Stars League: 18 teams from the 2022–23 Iraqi Premier League, as well as Al-Minaa and Amanat Baghdad who were promoted from the 2022–23 Iraqi First Division League and both returned to the top tier after a one-year absence.

== Teams ==
Locations of the 2023–24 Iraq Stars League teams

=== Clubs and locations ===
| Team | Manager | Location | Stadium | Capacity |
|---|---|---|---|---|
| Al-Hudood | (Iraq) Adel Nima | Baghdad | Al-Saher Ahmed Radhi Stadium | 5,150 |
| Al-Kahrabaa | (Iraq) Luay Salah | Baghdad | Al-Zawraa Stadium | 15,443 |
| Al-Karkh | (Egypt) Haitham Shaaban | Baghdad | Al-Saher Ahmed Radhi Stadium | 5,150 |
| Al-Minaa | (Iraq) Hassan Ahmed | Basra | Al-Minaa Olympic Stadium | 30,000 |
| Al-Naft | (Iraq) Basim Qasim | Baghdad | Al-Madina Stadium | 32,000 |
| Al-Najaf | (Iraq) Abdul-Ghani Shahad | Najaf | Al-Najaf International Stadium | 30,000 |
| Al-Qasim | (Syria) Ayman Hakeem | Babil | Karbala International Stadium | 30,000 |
| Al-Quwa Al-Jawiya | (Iraq) Razzaq Farhan | Baghdad | Al-Shaab Stadium | 35,700 |
| Al-Shorta | (Egypt) Moamen Soliman | Baghdad | Al-Shaab Stadium | 35,700 |
| Al-Talaba | (Iraq) Qahtan Chathir | Baghdad | Al-Shaab Stadium | 35,700 |
| Al-Zawraa | (Iraq) Essam Hamad | Baghdad | Al-Zawraa Stadium | 15,443 |
| Amanat Baghdad | (Iraq) Abbas Obeid | Baghdad | Al-Madina Stadium | 32,000 |
| Duhok | (Iraq) Ahmed Khalaf | Duhok | Duhok Stadium | 22,800 |
| Erbil | (Iraq) Samir Babo | Erbil | Franso Hariri Stadium | 25,000 |
| Karbala | (Iraq) Chasib Sultan | Karbala | Karbala International Stadium | 30,000 |
| Naft Al-Basra | (Jordan) Haitham Al-Shboul | Basra | Al-Minaa Olympic Stadium | 30,000 |
| Naft Al-Wasat | (Iraq) Emad Aoda | Najaf | Al-Najaf International Stadium | 30,000 |
| Naft Maysan | (Iraq) Ali Abdul-Jabbar | Maysan | Maysan Olympic Stadium | 25,000 |
| Newroz | (Syria) Nizar Mahrous | Sulaymaniya | Sulaymaniya Stadium | 15,000 |
| Zakho | (Qatar) Talal Al-Bloushi | Duhok | Zakho International Stadium | 20,000 |

== League table ==
| Pos | Team | Pld | W | D | L | GF | GA | GD | Pts | Qualification or relegation |
|---|---|---|---|---|---|---|---|---|---|---|
| 1 | Al-Shorta (C) | 38 | 26 | 9 | 3 | 76 | 36 | +40 | 87 | Qualification for the AFC Champions League Elite league stage |
| 2 | Al-Quwa Al-Jawiya | 38 | 24 | 10 | 4 | 68 | 32 | +36 | 82 | Qualification for the AFC Champions League Two group stage (Note: Since the winners of the 2023–24 Iraq FA Cup, Al-Shorta, qualified for the AFC Champions League Elite based on league position, the AFC Champions League Two spot was passed to the league runners-up Al-Quwa Al-Jawiya.) |
| 3 | Al-Zawraa | 38 | 21 | 12 | 5 | 54 | 23 | +31 | 75 | Qualification for the regional competition play-offs |
| 4 | Al-Najaf | 38 | 19 | 10 | 9 | 45 | 28 | +17 | 67 (Note: Al-Najaf finished ahead of Zakho on head-to-head points: Zakho 1–1 Al-Najaf, Al-Najaf 2–1 Zakho.) | Qualification for the regional competition play-offs |
| 5 | Zakho | 38 | 17 | 16 | 5 | 37 | 20 | +17 | 67 | Qualification for the regional competition play-offs |
| 6 | Duhok | 38 | 14 | 16 | 8 | 41 | 33 | +8 | 58 | Qualification for the AGCFF Gulf Club Champions League group stage via the regional competition play-offs |
| 7 | Newroz | 38 | 15 | 11 | 12 | 61 | 49 | +12 | 56 | |
| 8 | Al-Talaba | 38 | 13 | 14 | 11 | 40 | 38 | +2 | 53 | |
| 9 | Al-Hudood | 38 | 13 | 11 | 14 | 38 | 47 | −9 | 50 | |
| 10 | Naft Maysan | 38 | 10 | 17 | 11 | 41 | 40 | +1 | 47 | |
| 11 | Al-Naft | 38 | 10 | 16 | 12 | 37 | 44 | −7 | 46 | |
| 12 | Al-Minaa | 38 | 10 | 12 | 16 | 38 | 59 | −21 | 42 | |
| 13 | Al-Kahrabaa | 38 | 8 | 17 | 13 | 47 | 51 | −4 | 41 (Note: Al-Kahrabaa finished ahead of Erbil on head-to-head goal difference: Erbil 1–0 Al-Kahrabaa, Al-Kahrabaa 3–1 Erbil.) | |
| 14 | Erbil | 38 | 9 | 14 | 15 | 46 | 50 | −4 | 41 | |
| 15 | Al-Karkh | 38 | 7 | 18 | 13 | 36 | 45 | −9 | 39 | |
| 16 | Karbala | 38 | 8 | 13 | 17 | 39 | 60 | −21 | 37 | |
| 17 | Al-Qasim | 38 | 8 | 14 | 16 | 42 | 53 | −11 | 35 (Note: Al-Qasim were deducted three points for withdrawing from their match away to Al-Quwa Al-Jawiya in the 32nd minute.) | Qualification for the relegation play-out round |
| 18 | Naft Al-Basra | 38 | 8 | 10 | 20 | 29 | 46 | −17 | 34 | Qualification for the relegation play-out round |
| 19 | Amanat Baghdad (R) | 38 | 6 | 13 | 19 | 33 | 53 | −20 | 31 | Relegation to the Iraqi Premier Division League |
| 20 | Naft Al-Wasat (R) | 38 | 1 | 13 | 24 | 24 | 65 | −41 | 16 | Relegation to the Iraqi Premier Division League |

Source: IPFL
Rules for classification: 1) points; 2) head-to-head points; 3) head-to-head goal difference; 4) goal difference; 5) number of goals scored; 6) number of wins.
(C) Champions; (R) Relegated

== Results ==
| Home \ Away | HUD | KAH | KKH | MIN | NFT | NJF | QSM | QWJ | SHR | TLB | ZWR | AMN | DHK | ERB | KRB | NFB | NFW | NFM | NEW | ZAK |
|---|---|---|---|---|---|---|---|---|---|---|---|---|---|---|---|---|---|---|---|---|
| Al-Hudood | | 0–0 | 3–2 | 2–1 | 1–2 | 0–3 | 3–3 | 0–3 | 0–4 | 1–2 | 0–1 | 2–1 | 0–1 | 1–0 | 0–2 | 2–1 | 2–0 | 1–2 | 2–1 | 0–0 |
| Al-Kahrabaa | 1–1 | | 2–2 | 2–2 | 2–2 | 1–2 | 1–2 | 2–2 | 2–2 | 0–3 | 1–1 | 1–0 | 1–1 | 3–1 | 0–1 | 3–1 | 3–0 | 1–0 | 1–1 | 1–3 |
| Al-Karkh | 0–1 | 3–3 | | 4–1 | 0–0 | 0–3 | 1–1 | 0–1 | 1–4 | 1–1 | 0–3 | 0–0 | 1–0 | 0–0 | 1–2 | 1–0 | 0–0 | 0–0 | 2–1 | 0–1 |
| Al-Minaa | 1–1 | 1–3 | 1–3 | | 0–0 | 2–1 | 1–0 | 0–0 | 0–3 (Note: The Al-Minaa–Al-Shorta match was awarded as a 3–0 win to Al-Shorta, as Al-Minaa started the game with only seven players and had their player Mohammed Khudhair go off injured in the eighth minute while Al-Shorta were leading 1–0.) | 0–0 | 1–3 | 0–2 | 2–0 | 0–3 | 1–1 | 1–1 | 4–2 | 3–0 | 1–4 | 0–2 |
| Al-Naft | 0–2 | 3–2 | 2–2 | 1–1 | | 2–1 | 3–2 | 1–4 | 1–1 | 2–1 | 0–2 | 0–1 | 0–0 | 0–1 | 1–1 | 0–0 | 1–0 | 0–2 | 0–1 | 0–0 |
| Al-Najaf | 1–0 | 1–0 | 3–2 | 2–0 | 1–0 | | 1–0 | 0–1 | 2–2 | 2–0 | 0–0 | 1–1 | 1–0 | 1–1 | 0–2 | 0–0 | 2–0 | 0–0 | 1–0 | 2–1 |
| Al-Qasim | 1–0 | 3–3 | 0–0 | 0–0 | 2–3 | 1–2 | | 1–1 | 2–3 | 2–2 | 1–3 | 2–0 | 1–3 | 2–1 | 0–1 | 3–0 (Note: The Al-Qasim–Naft Al-Basra match originally ended 0–0 but was changed to a 3–0 win for Al-Qasim due to Naft Al-Basra involving the player Qasim Mohammed, who had not been included in the squad list submitted for the match.) | 2–2 | 0–3 | 0–1 | 0–0 |
| Al-Quwa Al-Jawiya | 3–2 | 2–0 | 1–0 | 4–2 | 2–0 | 1–0 | 3–0 (Note: The Al-Quwa Al-Jawiya–Al-Qasim match was awarded as a 3–0 win to Al-Quwa Al-Jawiya, after Al-Qasim withdrew from the game in protest at the referee awarding a penalty to Al-Quwa Al-Jawiya in the 32nd minute while the score was 0–0.) | | 2–2 | 1–1 | 0–1 | 1–1 | 1–0 | 2–1 | 2–1 | 0–0 | 3–2 | 1–1 | 2–1 | 2–1 |
| Al-Shorta | 2–0 | 2–1 | 2–1 | 2–0 | 0–1 | 2–0 | 2–0 | 1–1 | | 3–2 | 2–2 | 2–1 | 1–0 | 2–1 | 2–1 | 1–0 | 3–0 | 3–0 | 4–4 | 2–0 |
| Al-Talaba | 0–1 | 2–0 | 1–0 | 0–1 | 0–0 | 2–1 | 1–1 | 1–2 | 2–1 | | 0–1 | 3–2 | 0–2 | 1–0 | 0–0 | 2–3 | 1–2 | 0–4 | 1–0 | 1–1 |
| Al-Zawraa | 2–0 | 1–0 | 1–1 | 1–0 | 1–1 | 0–0 | 1–0 | 0–0 | 0–2 | 1–1 | | 0–0 | 3–0 | 3–0 | 5–2 | 3–0 | 2–0 | 3–1 | 0–2 | 1–1 |
| Amanat Baghdad | 0–0 | 1–1 | 1–1 | 0–1 | 2–2 | 1–2 | 0–1 | 0–2 | 1–2 | 0–2 | 1–2 | | 2–2 | 1–3 | 3–1 | 1–1 | 1–1 | 1–1 | 0–2 | 0–0 |
| Duhok | 0–0 | 1–1 | 0–0 | 4–4 | 0–0 | 1–0 | 1–0 | 2–1 | 2–0 | 1–3 | 1–1 | 2–0 | | 2–1 | 2–1 | 2–0 | 2–2 | 2–2 | 1–0 | 0–0 |
| Erbil | 0–0 | 1–0 | 0–0 | 1–2 | 1–1 | 1–1 | 0–1 | 1–4 | 2–4 | 0–0 | 0–1 | 4–1 | 1–1 | | 4–1 | 0–0 | 1–0 | 2–0 | 1–1 | 0–2 |
| Karbala | 1–1 | 0–0 | 2–1 | 1–2 | 0–2 | 0–0 | 1–1 | 0–3 | 1–2 | 0–0 | 1–0 | 1–2 | 1–1 | 3–5 | | 2–2 | 2–2 | 0–0 | 2–4 | 0–1 |
| Naft Al-Basra | 1–2 | 2–0 | 1–2 | 0–1 | 1–0 | 0–1 | 0–2 | 2–3 | 0–1 | 1–1 | 0–2 | 3–0 | 2–0 | 1–1 | 0–1 | | 1–0 | 0–2 | 0–1 | 0–2 |
| Naft Al-Wasat | 1–2 | 0–2 | 1–2 | 0–0 | 0–4 | 1–2 | 1–1 | 0–1 | 0–1 | 0–0 | 0–1 | 0–2 | 0–0 | 1–1 | 2–2 | 0–2 | | 0–2 | 0–4 | 1–2 |
| Naft Maysan | 1–1 | 0–0 | 1–1 | 3–0 | 0–0 | 2–1 | 2–2 | 0–4 | 2–3 | 0–1 | 1–1 | 0–1 | 0–3 | 1–1 | 3–0 | 1–2 | 0–0 | | 2–2 | 2–0 |
| Newroz | 2–3 | 1–1 | 1–1 | 0–0 | 3–1 | 0–3 | 2–1 | 4–2 | 1–1 | 1–2 | 1–0 | 3–2 | 0–1 | 4–4 | 3–0 | 1–1 | 4–3 | 0–0 | | 0–2 |
| Zakho | 1–1 | 0–2 | 0–0 | 3–1 | 3–0 | 1–1 | 1–1 | 1–0 | 0–0 | 0–0 | 1–0 | 1–0 | 0–0 | 2–1 | 2–1 | 1–0 | 0–0 | 0–0 | 1–0 | |

Source: IPFL
Legend: Blue = home team win; Yellow = draw; Red = away team win.
For upcoming matches, an "a" indicates there is an article about the rivalry between the two participants.

== Regional competition play-offs ==
The four teams that finished 3rd to 6th competed in a play-off tournament to decide Iraq's participant in the 2024–25 AGCFF Gulf Club Champions League. If a match ended in a draw after 90 minutes, there would be no extra time played and the game would go straight to a penalty shootout.

=== Play-off semi-finals ===
19 July 2024
19:30 UTC+3

| Al-Zawraa | 0–3 (Walkover) | Duhok |

Al-Shaab Stadium, Baghdad
19 July 2024
19:30 UTC+3

| Al-Najaf | 0–0 | Zakho |
Penalties
| Mestouri (penalty scored); Mendy (penalty missed); Sattar (penalty scored); Hameed (penalty scored); Dawood (penalty scored) | 4–3 | (penalty missed) Attwan; (penalty scored) Abid; (penalty missed) Gaúcho; (penalty scored) Zaki; (penalty scored) Kabwe |

Al-Zawraa Stadium, Baghdad

=== Play-off final ===
23 July 2024
19:30 UTC+3

| Duhok | 1–0 | Al-Najaf |
|---|---|---|
| Younis 37' |

Al-Shaab Stadium, Baghdad

Duhok qualified for the 2024–25 AGCFF Gulf Club Champions League.

== Relegation play-offs ==
=== Play-out round ===
The 17th and 18th-placed teams competed in a play-off, with the winner remaining in the Stars League and the loser advancing to the relegation play-off.

If the scores were level after 90 minutes, 30 minutes of extra time would be played. If the scores were still level after extra time, the 18th-placed team would advance to the relegation play-off due to their inferior league position.

20 July 2024
19:30 UTC+3

| Al-Qasim | 1–2 | Naft Al-Basra |
|---|---|---|
| Gyan 10' | | Salih 59'; Raad 90' |

Duhok Stadium, Duhok

=== Relegation play-off ===
The loser of the play-out round competed in a play-off with the 3rd-placed team from the Premier Division League for a place in next season's Stars League. If the match ended in a draw after 90 minutes, there would be no extra time played and the game would go straight to a penalty shootout.

24 July 2024
19:30 UTC+3

| Al-Qasim | 2–1 | Peshmerga Sulaymaniya |
|---|---|---|
| Mhaisen 80'; Abdul-Karim 90+6' | | Jamal 72' |

Al-Zawraa Stadium, Baghdad

Al-Qasim remained in the Iraq Stars League, while Peshmerga Sulaymaniya remained in the Iraqi Premier Division League.

== Season statistics ==
=== Top scorers ===
| Rank | Player | Team | Goals |
|---|---|---|---|
| 1 | (Iraq) Aymen Hussein | Al-Quwa Al-Jawiya | 27 |
| 2 | (Syria) Mahmoud Al-Mawas | Al-Shorta | 20 |
| 3 | (Syria) Alaa Al Dali | Naft Maysan | 18 |
| 3 | (Iraq) Ibrahim Ghazi | Al-Hudood | 18 |
| 5 | (Iraq) Mohanad Ali | Al-Shorta | 16 |
| 5 | (Nigeria) Ibrahim Tomiwa | Newroz | 16 |
| 5 | (Iraq) Mohammed Qasim Nassif | Erbil | 16 |

==== Hat-tricks ====
| Player | For | Against | Result | Date |
|---|---|---|---|---|
| (Syria) Alaa Al Dali | Naft Maysan | Al-Talaba | 4–0 (A) | 4 November 2023 |
| (Syria) Alaa Al Dali | Naft Maysan | Al-Minaa | 3–0 (H) | 1 December 2023 |
| (Iraq) Aymen Hussein | Al-Quwa Al-Jawiya | Al-Minaa | 4–2 (H) | 10 February 2024 |
| (Nigeria) Okiki Afolabi | Al-Naft | Naft Al-Wasat | 4–0 (A) | 17 February 2024 |
| (Iraq) Mohammed Qasim Nassif | Erbil | Karbala | 5–3 (A) | 19 February 2024 |
| (Iraq) Aymen Hussein | Al-Quwa Al-Jawiya | Al-Naft | 4–1 (A) | 4 March 2024 |
| (Iraq) Marwan Hussein | Newroz | Al-Minaa | 4–1 (A) | 25 April 2024 |
| (Nigeria) Ibrahim Tomiwa | Newroz | Al-Quwa Al-Jawiya | 4–2 (H) | 31 May 2024 |
| (Liberia) William Jebor^{4} | Al-Minaa | Naft Al-Wasat | 4–2 (H) | 18 June 2024 |

Notes

^{4} Player scored 4 goals
(H) – Home team
(A) – Away team

== Awards ==
| Award | Winner | Club |
|---|---|---|
| Player of the Season | (Syria) Mahmoud Al-Mawas | Al-Shorta |
| Goal of the Season | (Iraq) Bassam Shakir | Al-Shorta |
