= Habbaniyat Al-Sumoud SC =

Iraqi football club

Habbaniyat Al-Sumood SC
- Full name: Habbaniyat Al-Sumood Sport Club
- Founded: 2017; 8 years ago
- Ground: Habbaniyat Al-Sumood Stadium
- Chairman: Ahmed Abed Dayeh
- League: Iraqi Third Division League
Home colours	Away colours

Habbaniyat Al-Sumood Sport Club (Arabic: نادي حبانية الصمود الرياضي), is an Iraqi football team based in Al-Habbaniya, Al-Anbar, that plays in Iraqi Third Division League.

== Overview ==
Habbaniyat Al-Sumood club was established in 2017, and it played in the Iraq FA Cup for the 2020–21 and 2021–22 seasons, and played in the Iraqi Third Division League season 2021–22, and was promoted to the Iraqi Second Division League after topping its group, and it is currently playing in the Second Division League, and the club's president is Ahmed Abed Dayeh, who was re-elected in 2022.

== See also ==
- 2020–21 Iraq FA Cup
- 2021–22 Iraq FA Cup
