= Rashid Jaber =

Omani football manager

Personal information
- Full name: Rashid Jaber Al Yafi´i
- Date of birth: 16 February 1964 (age 62)
- Place of birth: Oman

Managerial career
- Years: Team
- 2008–2009: Muscat
- 2010: Al Suwaiq
- 2020–2022: Dhofar
- 2022–2023: Al-Seeb
- 2023: Al-Wehdat
- 2024–2025: Oman
- 2025–: Al-Quwa Al-Jawiya

Rashid Jaber Al Yafi´i (Arabic: رشيد جابر اليافعي) is an Omani football manager who last served as the head coach of Oman national football team.

== Managerial career ==
Jaber started his managerial career with Omani side Dhofar, helping them win the league and 1999 Sultan Qaboos Cup. In 1999, he was appointed manager of Al Nasr (Salalah) in Oman, helping them win the 2000 Sultan Qaboos Cup.

In 2001, Jaber was appointed manager of Oman. In 2022, he was appointed manager of Omani club Seeb, helping them win the 2022 AFC Cup, the only AFC trophy an Omani club has ever won.

On 19 September 2024, Jaber was again appointed manager of Oman.

== Honours ==
=== As manager ===
Al-Seeb

- AFC Cup: 2022

Al-Quwa Al-Jawiya

- Iraq Stars League: 2025–26
