= Al-Karma SC =

Iraqi football club

- Full name: Al-Karma Sport Club
- Nickname: Soqoor Al-Gharbiya (Western Falcons)
- Founded: 2020; 6 years ago
- Ground: Al-Ramadi Stadium
- Capacity: 10,000
- Chairman: Muthana Reikan Al-Halbousi
- Head coach: Adnan Hamad
- League: Iraq Stars League
- 2025–26: Iraq Stars League, 5th of 20
Home colours	Away colours

Al-Karma Sport Club (Arabic: نادي الكرمة الرياضي), also pronounced Al-Garma, is an Iraqi professional football club based in Al-Karmah, Al-Anbar, that plays in the Iraq Stars League, the top tier of Iraqi football. Founded in 2020, Al-Karma have won the Iraqi First Division League once and were the runner-up of the Iraqi Premier Division League once, and now participate in the Iraq Stars League.

== History ==
Founded in 2020, Al-Karma was promoted 3 times in the space of 4 years, having started off in the fourth tier of Iraqi football. In the 2023–24 season, Al-Karma managed to finish runner-up in the Iraqi Premier Division League and be promoted to play in the Iraq Stars League for the 2024–25 season for the first time in its history.

== Stadium ==
On March 9, 2020, work began on the construction of Al-Karma Stadium, with a capacity of 5,000, and the work is still ongoing. For their first season in the Iraq Stars League, they have used Al-Ramadi Stadium as their home stadium in Ramadi, the capital of Al Anbar Governorate which Al-Karmah is located in.

== Current squad ==
=== First-team squad ===
As of 16 September 2026

Note: Flags indicate national team as defined under FIFA eligibility rules; some limited exceptions apply. Players may hold more than one non-FIFA nationality.

No.	Pos.	Nation	Player
2	DF	JOR	Mohammad Abu Hashish
3	DF	IRQ	Ahmed Maknzi
4	DF	IRQ	Karrar Amer
5	DF	MAR	Ayoub Mouddane
6	MF	IRQ	Sajjad Jassim
7	FW	IRQ	Ahmed Sabri
8	MF	IRQ	Amoori Faisal
9	FW	IRQ	Wakaa Ramadan
11	FW	EGY	Marwan Hamdy
15	MF	JOR	Ibrahim Sadeh
17	DF	JOR	Yousef Al-Alousi

No.	Pos.	Nation	Player
21	FW	CGO	Wilden Bokouya
22	MF	IRQ	Moamel Abdulridha
23	FW	NGR	Samuel Amadi
24	MF	IRQ	Younis Ghani
28	FW	SEN	Paul Bassène
32	MF	IRQ	Ali Mokhalad
40	GK	IRQ	Laith Sajid
44	MF	NGR	Daniel Ajibola
65	GK	IRQ	Fahad Talib (captain)
77	DF	IRQ	Halo Fayaq
90	GK	IRQ	Fahad Neamah

== Personnel ==
=== Technical staff ===
Position	Staff
Head coach	(Egypt) Moamen Soliman
Assistant coach	(Iraq) Munir Jaber
Goalkeeping coach	(Egypt) Essam El-Behiry
Fitness coach	(Egypt) Mohammed Mustafa
Match analyst	(Spain) Dani Fernández

== Managerial history ==
- (Iraq) Shokur Ali Hassan
- (Iraq) Faleh Munif
- (Iraq) Khamis Humoud
- (Iraq) Shaker Mohammed Sabbar
- (Iraq) Haidar Mahmoud
- (Iraq) Ali Waheed
- (Iraq) Natiq Haddad
- (Iraq) Ghazi Fahad
- (Iraq) Ahmed Khalaf

== Honours ==
- Iraqi Premier Division League (second tier)
  - Runners-up (1): 2023–24
- Iraqi First Division League (third tier)
  - Winners (1): 2022–23
