= Mahmoud Al-Mawas =

Syrian footballer (born 1993)

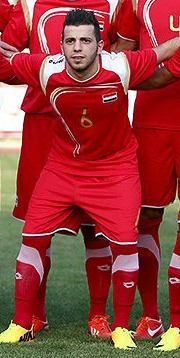
- Al-Mawas in 2013 with Syria

Personal information
- Full name: Mahmoud Kamal Al-Mawas
- Date of birth: 1 January 1993 (age 33)
- Place of birth: Hama, Syria
- Height: 1.68 m (5 ft 6 in)
- Positions: Winger; attacking midfielder

Team information
- Current team: Duhok

Youth career
- 1997–2006: Ommal Hama
- 2006–2009: Al-Karamah
- 2008–2009: → Al-Ain (loan)

Senior career*
Years	Team	Apps	(Gls)
2010–2013	Al-Karamah	0	(0)
2013	→ Al-Riffa (loan)	10	(5)
2013–2016	Al-Arabi	62	(17)
2015	→ Al Faisaly (loan)	2	(1)
2015–2016	→ Al-Riffa (loan)	0	(0)
2016–2017	Al-Muharraq	0	(0)
2017–2020	Umm Salal	75	(18)
2020–2021	Botoșani	25	(5)
2021–2026	Al-Shorta	172	(74)
2026–	Duhok	5	(0)

International career^{‡}
2007–2008	Syria U17		
2009–2011	Syria U20	5	(6)
2011–2012	Syria U23		
2012–	Syria	111	(18)
- * Club domestic league appearances and goals as of 4 September 2026 ‡ National team caps and goals as of 1 October 2026

Mahmoud Kamal Al-Mawas (Arabic: مَحْمُود كَمَال الْمَوَّاس; born 1 January 1993) is a Syrian professional footballer who plays as a winger or an attacking midfielder for Duhok in the Iraq Stars League and the Syria national team.

Mawas is the first ever non-Iraqi player to become the 'Iraqi Premier League' top scorer with 22 goals in the 2021–22 season. He also became the 2023–24 'Player of the Season' with his time at Al-Shorta.

== Club career ==
=== Al-Karamah ===
Mawas started his career with Al-Karamah, where in 2008, he joined UAE club Al-Ain on a 18 months loan. Mawas was then promoted to the senior squad in June 2009. In his first season, he won his first trophy, the 2009–10 Syrian Cup.

==== Al-Riffa (loan) ====
In January 2013, Mawas moved to Bahraini Premier League club Al-Riffa on a 6 months loan.

=== Al-Arabi ===
In July 2013, Mawas moved to Kuwait Premier League club Al-Arabi on a permanent transfer. In his first season at the club, he won the 2013–14 Kuwait Federation Cup with the club. In the next season, Mawas won the 2014–15 Kuwait Crown Prince Cup with Al-Arabi.

==== Al-Faisaly (loan) ====
On 30 June 2015, Mawas was loaned out to Saudi Pro League club Al-Faisaly. He scored his first goal for the club in a 2–1 lost against Al-Taawoun on 28 August. However, Mawas loaned deal was cut earlier on 15 September and he returned to Al-Arabi.

==== second stint at Al-Riffa (loan) ====
In October 2015, Mawas joined Al-Riffa on a season long loan at the club.

=== Al-Muharraq ===
In July 2016, Mawas moved to Bahrain club to join Al-Muharraq.

=== Umm Salal ===
In January 2017, Mawas joined Qatari club Umm Salal in the mid-transfer window ahead of the 2016–17 Qatar Stars League. He scored his first goal for the club in a 3–1 win against Lekhwiya on 15 February.

On 17 August 2018, Mawas scored a brace in a 4–1 win over Al-Ahli. He would then scored another brace in the same season against Al-Shahania in a 2–5 lost. On 23 August 2019, Mawas scored a brace in a 2–2 draw against Al-Rayyan.

=== Botoșani ===
On 24 November 2020, Mawas moved to Europe to joined Romanian club Botoșani. On 11 December 2020, he made his debut for Botoșani in a 1–1 draw against Astra Giurgiu. He scored his first goal for the club in a 2–1 away defeat against Academica Clinceni on 27 January 2021.

=== Al-Shorta ===
On 21 August 2021, Mawas joined Iraqi club Al-Shorta, where he won four consecutive league titles in 2021–22, 2022–23, 2023–24 and 2024–25. He finished his first season as league top scorer with 22 goals, and finished his third season as the Iraq Stars League 2023–24 'Player of the Season' helping his team to win the 2023–24 Iraq FA Cup.

== International career ==
Mawas represented Syria in the 2012 Summer Olympics Asian qualifiers. He also played at the 2008 AFC U-16 Championship in Uzbekistan.

Mawas scored his first international goal for Syria on 8 September 2015 during the 2018 FIFA World Cup qualification fixture against Cambodia at the Olympic Stadium in Phnom Penh. In December 2018, he was named in the Syrian squad for the 2019 AFC Asian Cup.

On 4 June 2021, Mawas scored his first international hat-trick against Maldives in the 2022 FIFA World Cup qualification in a 4–0 win. On 25 March 2025, he featured in his 100th international match for Syria in a 2–0 victory over Pakistan during the 2027 AFC Asian Cup qualification.

== Career statistics ==
=== International ===
As of 1 October 2026

Appearances and goals by national team and year
National team	Year	Apps	Goals
Syria	2012	5	0
Syria	2013	8	0
Syria	2014	3	0
Syria	2015	8	3
Syria	2016	12	3
Syria	2017	12	2
Syria	2018	7	0
Syria	2019	12	2
Syria	2020	2	1
Syria	2021	12	4
Syria	2022	5	0
Syria	2023	8	0
Syria	2024	5	1
Syria	2025	10	1
Syria	2026	2	1
Total		111	18

==== International goals ====
As of match played 25 November 2025. Syria score listed first, score column indicates score after each Al Mawas goal.

International goals by date, venue, opponent, score, result and competition
No.	Date	Venue	Opponent	Score	Result	Competition
1	8 September 2015	Olympic Stadium, Phnom Penh, Cambodia	Cambodia	4–0	6–0	2018 FIFA World Cup qualification
2	13 October 2015	Al-Seeb Stadium, Muscat, Oman	Afghanistan	3–0	5–2	2018 FIFA World Cup qualification
3	13 October 2015	Al-Seeb Stadium, Muscat, Oman	Afghanistan	5–2	5–2	2018 FIFA World Cup qualification
4	3 June 2016	Rajamangala Stadium, Bangkok, Thailand	Thailand	1–2	2–2 (6–7 p)	2016 King's Cup
5	5 June 2016	Rajamangala Stadium, Bangkok, Thailand	United Arab Emirates	1–0	1–0	2016 King's Cup
6	6 October 2016	Shaanxi Province Stadium, Xi'an, China	China	1–0	1–0	2018 FIFA World Cup qualification
7	13 June 2017	Hang Jebat Stadium, Malacca, Malaysia	China	1–0	2–2	2018 FIFA World Cup qualification
8	31 August 2017	Hang Jebat Stadium, Malacca, Malaysia	Qatar	3–1	3–1	2018 FIFA World Cup qualification
9	5 September 2019	Panaad Stadium, Bacolod, Philippines	Philippines	5–2	5–2	2022 FIFA World Cup qualification
10	15 October 2019	Maktoum bin Rashid Al Maktoum Stadium, Dubai, United Arab Emirates	Guam	4–0	4–0	2022 FIFA World Cup qualification
11	12 November 2020	Sharjah Stadium, Sharjah, United Arab Emirates	Uzbekistan	1–0	1–0	Friendly
12	4 June 2021	Sharjah Stadium, Sharjah, United Arab Emirates	Maldives	1–0	4–0	2022 FIFA World Cup qualification
13	4 June 2021	Sharjah Stadium, Sharjah, United Arab Emirates	Maldives	3–0	4–0	2022 FIFA World Cup qualification
14	4 June 2021	Sharjah Stadium, Sharjah, United Arab Emirates	Maldives	4–0	4–0	2022 FIFA World Cup qualification
15	7 June 2021	Sharjah Stadium, Sharjah, United Arab Emirates	Guam	3–0	3–0	2022 FIFA World Cup qualification
16	6 September 2024	G. M. C. Balayogi Athletic Stadium, Hyderabad, India	Mauritius	2–0	2–0	2024 Intercontinental Cup
17	25 November 2025	Grand Hamad Stadium, Doha, Qatar	South Sudan	2–0	2–0	2025 FIFA Arab Cup qualification
18	5 June 2026	National Football Stadium, Minsk, Belarus	Belarus	1–4	1–4	Friendly

== Honours ==
Al-Karamah

- Syrian Cup: 2010

Al-Arabi

- Kuwait Federation Cup: 2013–14
- Kuwait Crown Prince Cup: 2014–15

Al-Shorta

- Iraq Stars League: 2021–22, 2022–23, 2023–24, 2024–25
- Iraq FA Cup: 2023–24
- Iraqi Super Cup: 2022

Syria

- WAFF Championship: 2012

Individual

- Iraqi Premier League top scorer: 2021–22
- Iraq Stars League Player of the Season: 2023–24
