= Al-Jawhara SC =

Iraqi football club

- Full name: Al-Jawhara Sport Club
- Founded: 2021; 5 years ago
- Ground: Al-Jawhara Stadium
- Chairman: Hussein Al-Saabari
- Manager: Jassim Jaber Al-Awadi
- League: Iraqi Second Division League
- 2025–26: Iraqi Second Division League, 4th of 20
Home colours	Away colours

Al-Jawhara Sport Club (Arabic: نادي الجوهرة الرياضي), is an Iraqi football team based in Babil, that plays in the Iraqi Second Division League.

== History ==
In the first year of its foundation, Al-Jawhara team played in the 2021–22 Iraqi Third Division League, and in the same season, they topped their group, and they were able to promote to the Iraqi Second Division League without scoring a goal against them.

In the second season, the team played in 2022–23 Iraqi Second Division League, and was able to top its group in the first stage of the tournament, and move to the second stage as a representative of Babil.

== Managerial history ==
- (Iraq) Qahtan Dakhel
- (Iraq) Jassim Jaber Al-Awadi

== See also ==
- 2021–22 Iraqi Third Division League
