= Al-Hadbaa SC =

Iraqi football club

- Full name: Al-Hadbaa Sport Club
- Founded: 2004; 21 years ago
- Ground: Al-Dawasa Stadium
- Chairman: Mohammed Abdul-Wahab
- Manager: Faris Idris
- League: Iraqi Third Division League
Home colours	Away colours

Al-Hadbaa Sport Club (Arabic: نادي الحدباء الرياضي), is an Iraqi football team based in Nineveh.

== History ==
=== Club building bombing ===
After ISIS took control of Mosul in 2014, they blew up the club's building, and after liberation in 2017 it was rebuilt, and the building opened in November 2019.

=== in Third Division League ===
Al-Hadbaa played in the Iraqi Third Division League in the 2021–22 season and topped its group, and qualified for the final, but lost the championship title in the final match against Kafaat Nineveh SC by penalty kicks, and the two teams promoted together to the Iraqi Second Division League.

=== In Second Division League ===
Al-Hadbaa played in Iraqi Second Division League in the 2022–23 season and passed the First Stage as a representative of Nineveh with Baladiyat Al-Mosul, and qualified for the Second Stage to play in the Northern Group.

== Other games ==
Al-Hadbaa is a multi-sports club, and some of its teams have won championships, such as the karate and cycling teams.

== Managerial history ==
- (Iraq) Faris Idris

== See also ==
- 2022–23 Iraq FA Cup
