= Afak District =

Afak District Arabic: قضاء العفك
- District
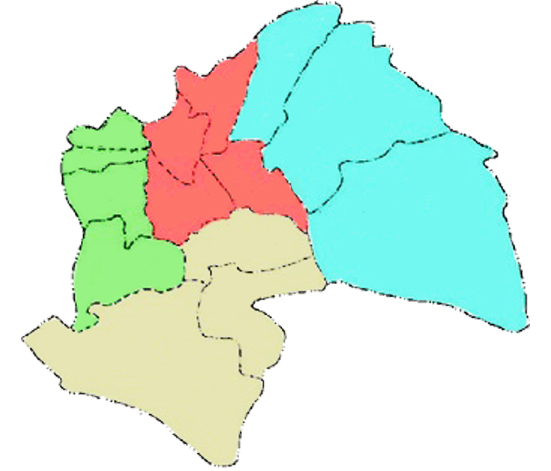
- Afak district in light blue
- Interactive map of Afak District
- Coordinates: 31°56′0.24″N 45°24′51.41″E
- Country: Iraq
- Governorate: Al-Qādisiyyah
- Seat: Afak

Population (2015)
  - Total: 95,948
- Time zone: UTC+3 (AST)

Afak District (Arabic: عفك) is a district in Al-Qadisiyyah Governorate, southern Iraq. Its seat is the town of Afak. It has three subdistricts: Afak (عفك), Al-Deir (بدير), and Sumer (سومر).
