= Al-Sinaat Al-Harbiya SC =

- Full name: Al-Sinaat Al-Harbiya sport club
- Founded: 1992; 34 years ago as Al-Qaqaa
- Ground: Al-Qaqaa Stadium
- Chairman: Mohammed Sahib Al-Darraji
- Manager: Qasim Nahw
- League: Iraqi First Division League
- 2025–26: Iraqi Second Division League, 1st of 20 (promoted)
Home colours	Away colours

Al-Sinaat Al-Harbiya Sport Club (Arabic: نادي الصناعات الحربية الرياضي) is an Iraqi football club based in Al-Karkh, Baghdad, that plays in Iraqi First Division League.

== History ==
=== Overview ===
Al-Sinaat Al-Harbiya was founded in 1992 under the name of Al-Qaqaa, and it played in the Iraq FA Cup in the 1998–99 and 2001–02 seasons, and it also played in the preliminary qualifiers for the Iraqi Premier League in the 2000–01 season, and after 2003 the club's activities were suspended. In August 2021, the club's sports activities were restored, and its name was changed to Al-Sinaat Al-Harbiya, and it played in the Iraqi Third Division League. The team won the Iraqi Third Division League title for the 2024–25 season after winning the final match against New Sirwan 2–1.

== Managerial history ==
- (Iraq) Uday Ghawi
- (Iraq) Basil Baqer
- (Iraq) Qasim Nahw

== Honours ==
- Iraqi Second Division League (fourth tier)
  - Winners: 2025–26
- Iraqi Third Division League (fifth tier)
  - Winners: 2024–25

== See also ==
- 1998–99 Iraq FA Cup
- 2000–01 Iraqi Elite League
- 2001–02 Iraq FA Cup
