= Akkad SC =

Iraqi football club

- Full name: Akkad Football Club
- Founded: 2003; 23 years ago
- Ground: Al Shatrah Stadium
- Capacity: 7,500
- Chairman: Maitham Al-Musawi
- Manager: Abdul-Amir Aziz (interim)
- League: Iraqi First Division League
- 2025–26: Iraqi Second Division League, 2nd of 20 (promoted)
Home colours	Away colours

Akkad Sport Club (Arabic: نادي أكد الرياضي), is an Iraqi football team based in Al-Shatrah, Dhi Qar, that plays in Iraqi First Division League.

== Managerial history ==
- (Iraq) Abdul-Amir Aziz
- (Iraq) Azhar Tahir
- (Iraq) Bassim Obaid

== See also ==
- 2021–22 Iraqi Second Division League
