= Al-Kifl SC =

Iraqi football club

- Full name: Al-Kifl Sport Club
- Nickname: Al-Suqoor (The Hawks)
- Founded: 2003; 22 years ago
- Ground: Al-Kifl Stadium
- Capacity: 10,000
- Chairman: Maitham Al-Jubouri
- Manager: Nadhim Hussein
- League: Iraqi Second Division League
- 2024–25: Iraqi First Division League, 18th of 20 (relegated)
Home colours	Away colours

Al-Kifl Sport Club (Arabic: نادي الكفل الرياضي), is an Iraqi football team based in Al-Kifl, Babil, that plays in Iraqi Second Division League.

== Managerial history ==
- (Iraq) Kadhim Nasser
- (Iraq) Nadhim Hussein

== See also ==
- 2018–19 Iraq FA Cup
- 2019–20 Iraq FA Cup
- 2020–21 Iraq FA Cup
- 2021–22 Iraq FA Cup
