= Al-Suwaira SC =

Iraqi football club

- Full name: Al-Suwaira Sport Club
- Founded: 1991; 34 years ago
- Ground: Al-Suwaira Stadium
- Chairman: Najih Attiya Thoib
- Manager: Nazar Marah
- League: Iraqi Second Division League
Home colours	Away colours

Al-Suwaira Sport Club (Arabic: نادي الصويرة الرياضي), is an Iraqi football team based in Al-Suwaira, Wasit, that plays in Iraqi Second Division League.

== Managerial history ==
- (Iraq) Shaaban Farhan
- (Iraq) Nazar Marah

== See also ==
- 2020–21 Iraq FA Cup
- 2021–22 Iraq FA Cup
