= Al-Zubair SC =

Iraqi football club

- Full name: Al-Zubair Sport Club
- Founded: 1971; 55 years ago
- Ground: Al-Zubair Stadium
- Capacity: 5,000
- Chairman: Aziz Hamad
- Manager: Hussein Naseer
- League: Iraqi Second Division League
Home colours	Away colours

Al-Zubair Sport Club (Arabic: نادي الزبير الرياضي), is an Iraqi football team based in Al-Zubair, Basra, that plays in Iraqi Second Division League.

== Managerial history ==
- (Iraq) Naeem Nouri
- (Iraq) Nayef Falah
- (Iraq) Hussein Naseer

== Famous players ==
- (Iraq) Mahir Habib
- (Iraq) Ghazi Fahad
- (Iraq) Nawaf Falah
- (Iraq) Nasser Talla Dahilan

== See also ==
- 2000–01 Iraqi Elite League
- 2021–22 Iraq FA Cup
