= Al-Osra SC =

Iraqi football club

- Full name: Al-Osra Sport Club
- Founded: 2021; 4 years ago
- Ground: Al-Osra Stadium
- Manager: Alaa Karim
- League: Iraqi Third Division League
| Home colours | Away colours |

Al-Osra Sport Club (Arabic: نادي الأسرة الرياضي), is an Iraqi football team based in Karbala, that plays in the Iraqi Third Division League.

== Managerial history ==
- (Iraq) Alaa Karim

== See also ==
- 2022–23 Iraq FA Cup
