= Al-Sikak SC =

Iraqi football club

- Full name: Al-Sikak Sport Club
- Founded: 20 April 2011; 14 years ago
- Ground: Al-Sikak Stadium
- Chairman: Salam Hashim
- Manager: Sameer Yassin
- League: Iraqi Second Division League
Home colours	Away colours

Al-Sikak Sport Club (Arabic: نادي السكك الرياضي), is an Iraqi football team based in Baghdad, that plays in the Iraqi Second Division League.

== Managerial history ==
- (Iraq) Sameer Yassin

== See also ==
- 2021–22 Iraqi Second Division League
