= Safwan SC =

Iraqi football club

- Full name: Safwan Sport Club
- Founded: 1993; 33 years ago
- Ground: Safwan Stadium
- Chairman: Hameed Al-Darraji
- Manager: Sami Kharnoob
- League: Iraqi Second Division League
Home colours	Away colours

Safwan Sport Club (Arabic: نادي سفوان الرياضي), is an Iraqi football team based in Safwan, Basra.

== Managerial history ==
- (Iraq) Ahmed Azaitar
- (Iraq) Sami Kharnoob

== See also ==
- 2021–22 Iraqi Second Division League
