= Diyala SC =

Iraqi football club

Diyala
- Full name: Diyala Sports Club
- Nickname: The Orange
- Founded: 1957; 69 years ago
- Ground: Ba'quba Stadium
- Capacity: 10,000
- Chairman: Ahmed Al-Mousawi
- Manager: Sadeq Hanoon
- League: Iraq Stars League
- 2025–26: Iraq Stars League, 12th of 20
- Website: https://www.diyalaclub.com/?hl=ar
Home colours	Away colours

Diyala Sports Club (Arabic: نادي ديالى) is an Iraqi professional football club based in Diyala, that plays in the Iraq Stars League.

== History ==
Diyala club played in the Iraqi Premier League for the first time in the 1975–76 season, and was relegated to the Iraqi First Division League. The team played in the Premier League for 14 seasons until the 2010–11 season, during which it was relegated 4 times, and withdrew twice. In the 2023–24 season, Diyala managed to won the Iraqi Premier Division League and was promoted to the Iraq Stars League again for the 2024–25 season.

== First-team squad ==
As of 16 September 2026

Note: Flags indicate national team as defined under FIFA eligibility rules; some limited exceptions apply. Players may hold more than one non-FIFA nationality.

No.	Pos.	Nation	Player
1	GK	IRQ	Dilovan Mahdi
2	DF	IRQ	Ali Abd-Alruhman (captain)
3	DF	TUN	Chiheb Salhi
4	DF	IRQ	Mustafa Mohammed
5	DF	TUN	Youssri Arfaoui
6	MF	IRQ	Ali Qasim Yousef
7	MF	IRQ	Zidane Jabbar
8	MF	JOR	Khaled Sayaheen
9	FW	IRQ	Dhulfiqar Al-Imari
10	FW	TUN	Nassim Sioud
11	MF	IRQ	Muntadher Mohammed
12	GK	IRQ	Ali Ramadhan
14	MF	SYR	Mouhamad Anez

No.	Pos.	Nation	Player
15	MF	IRQ	Mohammed Khudair
18	FW	IRQ	Salim Ahmed
25	MF	IRQ	Ali Raheem
29	MF	YEM	Abdulwasea Al-Matari
30	GK	IRQ	Mohammed Hasan
33	DF	IRQ	Mustafa Al-Jalil
44	DF	IRQ	Ali Noori
70	DF	IRQ	Sadiq Jamal Hamd
73	MF	IRQ	Ahmed Samir
88	FW	IRQ	Ridha Mohammad
95	DF	CMR	Gaby Kiki
99	MF	IRQ	Ali Kareem

== Honours ==
- Iraqi Premier Division League
  - Winners (2): 1996–97, 2023–24
