= Diyala Stadium =

Stadium in Baqubah, Diyala, Iraq

Diyala Stadium ملعب ديالى
- Interactive map of Diyala Stadium ملعب ديالى
- Location: Baqubah, Iraq
- Coordinates: 33°44′53.0″N 44°39′26.0″E
- Capacity: 10,000

Tenant
- Diyala football club

Diyala Stadium (Arabic: ملعب ديالى), also known as Ba'quba Stadium, is a multi-use stadium in Baqubah, Diyala Governorate, Iraq. It is used for football matches and serves as the home stadium of Diyala football club. The stadium holds about 10,000 people.

== See also ==
- List of football stadiums in Iraq
