= Al-Gharraf SC =

Iraqi football club

- Full name: Al-Gharraf Sport Club
- Founded: 1994; 32 years ago
- Ground: Al-Gharraf Stadium
- Chairman: Kadhim Hamad Farhan
- Manager: Yamen Zelfani
- League: Iraq Stars League
- 2025–26: Iraq Stars League, 14th of 20
Home colours	Away colours

Al-Gharraf Sport Club (Arabic: نادي الغراف الرياضي) is an Iraqi football team based in Dhi Qar, that plays in Iraq Stars League.

The team finished runner-up in the Iraqi Premier Division League in 2024–25 season, earning promotion to the Iraq Stars League for the first time in its history.

== Current squad ==
=== First-team squad ===
As of 16 September 2026

Note: Flags indicate national team as defined under FIFA eligibility rules; some limited exceptions apply. Players may hold more than one non-FIFA nationality.

No.	Pos.	Nation	Player
2	DF	IRQ	Khudhur Ali
3	MF	ZAM	Prince Mumba
4	DF	IRQ	Ali Faez
5	DF	TOG	Magnime Agbotcho
6	MF	CMR	David Atsam
7	FW	IRQ	Abdul Faisal
8	MF	IRQ	Ammar Ghalib
9	FW	IRQ	Hussein Lawendy
10	FW	IRQ	Shareef Abdul-Kadhim
11	MF	BRA	Matheus Firmino
14	FW	IRQ	Jaber Dhumad
15	FW	TUN	Ahmed Hadhri
16	DF	IRQ	Ahmed Naaim

No.	Pos.	Nation	Player
18	DF	IRQ	Muqtada Saad
20	MF	IRQ	Murtadha Ali
21	MF	IRQ	Layth Dheyaa (captain)
22	GK	IRQ	Hussein Ali
24	MF	IRQ	Hassan Dakhel
25	MF	IRQ	Ammar Dakhel
27	DF	NGR	Erhun Obanor
30	GK	IRQ	Wisam Mohammed
31	DF	IRQ	Mustafa Moyed
33	GK	IRQ	Abbas Ahmed
44	DF	IRQ	Hussein Falih
99	FW	NGR	Tayo Abiodoun

== Managerial history ==
- (Iraq) Ghalib Turki
- (Iraq) Khalaf Naeem
- (Iraq) Jalil Ibrahim
- (Iraq) Abdul-Amir Aziz
- (Iraq) Moayed Tuama
- (Iraq) Haider Obeid
- (Iraq) Qahtan Chathir
- (Tunisia) Yamen Zelfani

== See also ==
- 2021–22 Iraqi Third Division League
- 2022–23 Iraqi Second Division League
