= Al-Fahad SC =

Iraqi football club

- Full name: Al-Fahad Sport Club
- Founded: 2010; 16 years ago
- Ground: Al-Fahad Stadium
- Chairman: Faris Abdullah Hammadi
- Manager: Ali Jawad
- League: Iraqi Premier Division League
- 2025–26: Iraqi Premier Division League, 11th of 20
Home colours	Away colours

Al-Fahad Sport Club (Arabic: نادي الفهد الرياضي), is an Iraqi football team based in Al-Khalidiya, Al-Anbar, that plays in the Iraqi Premier Division League.

== Stadium after ISIS era ==
After ISIS took over Al-Anbar, several battles took place between ISIS and the Iraqi army. Some of those battles took place on the club's stadium, until the Iraqi army managed to liberate Al-Khalidiya in July 2015. After the liberation, the club's president and a number of fans demanded the Ministry of Youth and Sports to rehabilitate the stadium, because it falls under the supervision of this ministry.

== Current squad ==
=== First-team squad ===
As of 30 May 2024

Note: Flags indicate national team as defined under FIFA eligibility rules; some limited exceptions apply. Players may hold more than one non-FIFA nationality.

No.	Pos.	Nation	Player
5	MF	IRQ	Kesebe
10	FW	IRQ	Ammar Ayal
11	FW	IRQ	Ayoub Jumaa
12	DF	IRQ	Rasoul Mansi
13	MF	IRQ	Dhulfiqar Malik
15	DF	IRQ	Mohannad Arzeij
19	FW	IRQ	Mohammed Ayad
20	MF	IRQ	Naeem Khudhair
21	FW	IRQ	Ahmed Khamees

No.	Pos.	Nation	Player
22	GK	IRQ	Yousif Hameed
24	MF	IRQ	Hassan Ali
27	FW	IRQ	Mohammed Dakano
36	GK	IRQ	Waleed Kareem
55	DF	IRQ	Salah Hassan
68	DF	IRQ	Hussein Raheem
80	MF	IRQ	Ridha Fadhil
88	DF	IRQ	Mohammed Shoueli
95	MF	IRQ	Ali Abbood
99	FW	IRQ	Mohammed Deli

== Managerial history ==
- (Iraq) Jabbar Hamid
- (Iraq) Anmar Salam
- (Iraq) Ali Jawad

== See also ==
- Battle of Ramadi (2014–2015)
- 2012–13 Iraq FA Cup
- 2020–21 Iraq FA Cup
