= Al-Fallujah Stadium =

Stadium in Iraq

- ملعب الفلوجة
- Interactive map of Al-Fallujah Stadium
- Location: Al-Fallujah, Al-Anbar, Iraq
- Coordinates: 33°21′05.0″N 43°48′39.7″E
- Owner: Al-Anbar Governorate
- Capacity: 7,000
- Surface: Grass
- Field size: 105 by 68 metres (114.8 yd × 74.4 yd)

Construction
- Built: 2012-2013, 2021-2022
- Opened: 21 February 2022
- Cost: 8.5 billion IQD

Tenant
- Al-Jolan SC

Al-Fallujah Stadium (Arabic: ملعب الفلوجة, Malʿabu al-Fallūjah) is a multi-purpose stadium in Al-Fallujah, Iraq. It is currently used mostly for football matches and is the home stadium of Al-Jolan SC. Opened in February 2022, it has a capacity of 7,000 spectators.

== History ==
Construction started in 2012 and stopped in December 2013 at 93% completion. The stadium turned then into a shelter for Syrian refugee families who fled to Al-Anbar. The stadium suffered various damages such as the scorching of its turf, the breaking of its seats and the deterioration of several of its compartments.

After the relocation of the refugees, the government of Al-Anbar announced in 2021 the restoration of the stadium.

The inauguration of the stadium took place on 21 February 2022 during a football match between Al-Jolan SC and Dujail SC.

== See also ==
- List of football stadiums in Iraq
