= Afak =

Afak Arabic: عفك
- Town
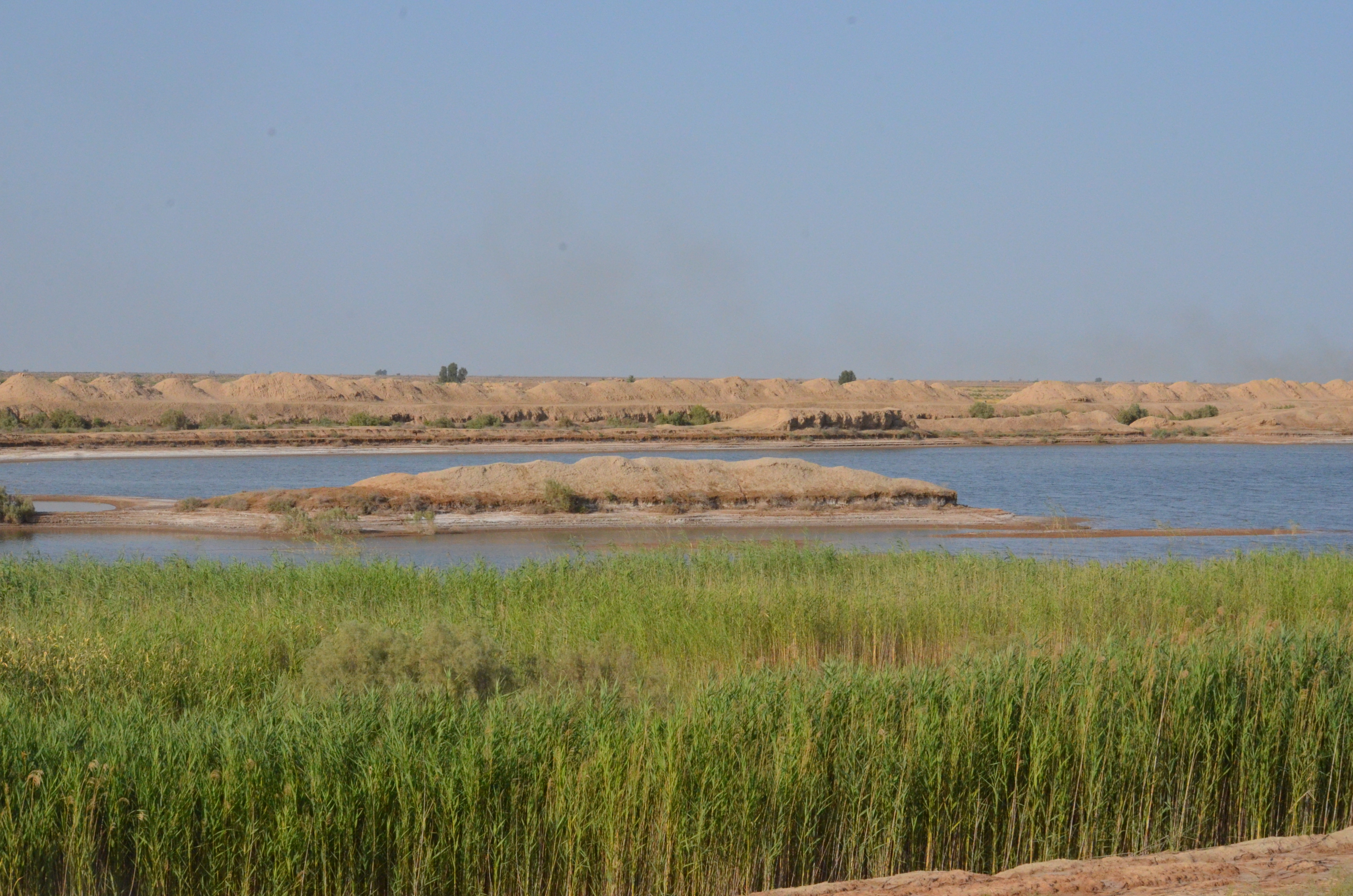

- Location within Iraq
- Coordinates: 32°03′45″N 45°14′34″E
- Country: Iraq
- Governorate: Qādisiyyah
- District: Afak
- Date of establishment: 1715

Population
  - Total: 165,000
- District total

Afak (Arabic: عفك) is a town in Al-Qadisiyah Governorate, Iraq. It is located 25 km (16 mi) northeast of Al Diwaniyah and 170 km (105 mi) south of Baghdad.

As of 2026, the estimated population of the Afak district is 165,000 and Afak (Town) is estimated at 21,888.

It is speculated that the lost city of Irisaĝrig is located near Afak.
