= Iraqi Second Division League =

- Founded: 1974; 52 years ago
- Country: Iraq
- Number of clubs: 20
- Level on pyramid: 4
- Promotion to: Iraqi First Division League
- Relegation to: Iraqi Third Division League
- Current champions: Al-Sinaat Al-Harbiya (2025–26)

The Iraqi Second Division League is a football league that is the fourth tier of the Iraqi football league system. The league was founded in 1974, and consists of 20 teams split into two groups. The winners of each group are promoted to the Iraqi First Division League and advance to the final to compete for the league title. The runners-up of each group compete in a two-legged third place play-off, with the winners also being promoted to the First Division League.

The two teams that finish bottom of their group are relegated to the Iraqi Third Division League. The ninth-placed teams of each group compete in a two-legged play-off, with the loser also being relegated to the Third Division League. The league is governed by the Iraq Football Association (IFA).

In the 2025–26 season, Al-Sinaat Al-Harbiya won the championship title after defeating Akkad 4–3 on penalties after a 1–1 draw in the final match.

== Competition name ==
Period	Name
1974–1995	National Clubs Fourth Division League
1995–1999	Third Division League
1999–2000	Fourth Division League
2000–2002	Third Division League
2002–2003	Fourth Division League
2003–2023	Third Division League
2023–present	Second Division League

== Current clubs ==
=== 2025–26 season ===
Group 1	Group 2
Al-Mawarid Al-Maiya	Al-Suwaira
Al-Radd	Al-Khidhir
Sulaymaniya	Al-Jawhara
Naft Al-Shamal	Akkad
Al-Sinaat Al-Harbiya	Al-Kifl
Tuz	Safwan
Al-Tijara	Al-Zubair
Al-Sikak	Tishreen
Al-Khalis	Al-Numaniya
Al-Nasr Al-Anbari	Al-Kut

== See also ==
- Iraq Stars League
- Iraq FA Cup
- Iraqi Super Cup
