= Al-Khalidiya, Iraq =

Al-Khaldiya الخالدية Al-Khaldiya
- Location within Iraq
- Coordinates: 33°23′4″N 43°31′31″E
- Country: Iraq
- Governorate: Al Anbar

Population
  - Total: 29.986
- Time zone: UTC+3 (GMT+3)
- Postal code: 31010

Al-Khalidiya (Arabic: الخالدية, also Al-Khaldiya, Khalidiya, Khalediya) is a city in Al-Anbar Province, in central Iraq, on the southern banks of river Euphrates. It was founded in 1969 as a settlement for Assyrian Christian families who were displaced as a result of the closure of RAF Habbaniya, though it is now predominantly populated by Sunni Arabs. The city was named after Khalid Shakar, deputy of Iraqi Baath party founder Fuad al-Rikabi. North of Al-Khaldiya, on the northern banks of Euphrates river, the peninsula of Khalidiya Island is located.

Al-Khalidiya was captured by ISIL militants in 2014. Although the city was recaptured by Iraqi security forces, only four buildings remained after intense fighting between ISIL militants and security forces.
