= Al-Ramadi Stadium =

Stadium in Iraq

- ملعب الرمادي
- Interactive map of Al-Ramadi Stadium
- Location: Ramadi, Iraq
- Coordinates: 33°25′14.8″N 43°19′18.3″E
- Capacity: 15,000

Tenant
- Al-Ramadi SC

Al-Ramadi Stadium (Arabic: ملعب الرمادي) is a multi-use stadium in Ramadi, Iraq. It is currently used mostly for football matches and serves as the home stadium of Al-Ramadi SC. The stadium holds 10,000 people.

== See also ==
- List of football stadiums in Iraq
