= 2021–22 Iraqi Second Division League =

Iraqi Second Division League
- Season: 2021–22
- Dates: 10 September 2021 – 22 June 2022
- Champions: Al-Etisalat
- Promoted: Al-Etisalat; Al-Hawija; Al-Jolan; Masafi Al-Wasat
- Relegated: Al-Ahrar; Al-Amara; Al-Anbar; Al-Hamza; Al-Husseiniyah; Al-Khairat; Al-Fosfat; Al-Madhatyia; Al-Mohandessin; Al-Sadda; Al-Taliea; Al-Zaeem; Baladiyat Al-Nasiriyah; Bilad Al-Rafidain; Daquq; Ghaz Al-Janoob; Jalawla; Kahrabaa Al-Hartha; Khallat; New Sirwan; Peshwa; Salahaddin; Sarchinar; Shabab Al-Adil; Tarmi; Umm Qasr

The 2021–22 Iraqi Second Division League was the 48th season of what is now called the Iraqi First Division League, the third tier of the Iraqi football league system, since its establishment in 1974. The number of clubs in the league have varied throughout history for various reasons; in this season the number of clubs was 112. The top four teams in the Final Qualifiers were promoted directly to the Iraqi First Division League, while the last eighteen teams in the Qualifiers within the Governorates were relegated directly to the Iraqi Third Division League. The season started on 10 November 2021.

Al-Etisalat won the championship title after defeating Al-Hawija in the final match, with a big score of 5–0.

== Teams ==
The Iraqi Second Division League starts with 126 clubs and ends with four qualified clubs according to three rounds:

Round	Stage	Main date	Clubs participating	Clubs remaining	Qualify for
1st	Qualifiers within the Governorates	10 November 2021	112	27	Qualifiers within the Territories
2nd	Qualifiers within the Territories	18 January 2022	27	8	Final Qualifiers
3rd	Final Qualifiers	9 May 2022	8	4	Promotion to the Iraqi FirstDivision League

== Qualifiers within the Governorates ==
The 112 clubs are divided into 16 groups depending on the location, except for the groups of Dohuk and Erbil, each group representing the governorate to which these clubs belong and is located within its borders.

No.	Governorate	Clubs participating	Club(s) remaining
1	Dohuk		
2	Nineveh	Al-Amwaj Al-Mosuli; Al-Mustaqbal Al-Mushriq; Al-Shoura; Baladiyat Al-Mosul; Mosul; Omal Nineveh; Rabia; Sahl Nineveh; Tarmi	Al-Amwaj Al-Mosuli; Mosul
3	Erbil		
4	Kirkuk	Al-Hawija; Al-Shorija; Daquq; Dibis; Musalla; Peshwa; Tuz	Al-Hawija; Tuz
5	Sulaymaniyah	Baban; Khallat; New Sirwan; Penjwen; Sarchinar; Sulaymaniya	Baban
6	Saladin	Al-Dujail; Baiji; Balad; Salahaddin; Shabab Al-Dawr	Al-Dujail
7	Al Anbar	Al-Anbar; Al-Fahad; Al-Fosfat; Al-Habbaniya; Al-Jolan; Al-Nasr; Al-Raed; Al-Sufiya; Hit	Al-Jolan; Al-Sufiya
8	Baghdad	Al-Adala; Al-Etisalat; Al-Jaish; Al-Jamiea; Al-Kadhimiya; Al-Khutoot; Al-Mahmoudiyah; Al-Mohandessin; Al-Najda; Al-Shuala; Al-Sikak; Al-Taji; Al-Taliea; Al-Zafaraniyah; Haifa; Masafi Al-Wasat; Shabab Al-Adil	Al-Etisalat; Al-Kadhimiya; Al-Khutoot; Al-Sikak; Al-Zafaraniyah; Masafi Al-Wasat
9	Diyala	Al-Khalis; Balad Ruz; Bilad Al-Rafidain; Jadidat Al-Shatt; Jalawla; Qazaniya; Shahraban	Al-Khalis; Balad Ruz
10	Karbala	Al-Ghadhriya; Al-Hindiya; Al-Hurr; Al-Husseiniyah; Al-Khairat	Al-Ghadhriya
11	Babil	Al-Kifl; Al-Madhatyia; Al-Mashroua; Al-Musayyab; Al-Sadda	Al-Kifl
12	Wasit	Al-Ahrar; Al-Hay; Al-Jihad; Al-Kut; Al-Muwafaqiya; Al-Numaniya; Al-Suwaira; Al-Zaaiem	Al-Numaniya; Al-Suwaira
13	Najaf	Al-Izdihar; Al-Khawarnaq; Al-Meshkhab; Al-Tadamon	Al-Meshkhab
14	Al-Qādisiyyah	Al Bdeir; Al-Ettefaq; Al-Hamza; Al-Najma; Al-Shamiya	Al Bdeir
15	Maysan	Al-Amara; Al-Maimouna; Al-Sukar; Dijlah; Qalat Saleh	Al-Sukar
16	Muthanna	Al-Khidhir; Al-Muthanna; Al-Rumaitha; Al-Salman; Thawrat Al-Eshreen; Uruk	Al-Khidhir
17	Dhi Qar	Akkad; Al-Forat; Al-Rifai; Al-Shatra; Baladiyat Al-Nasiriyah	Al-Forat
18	Basra	Al-Basra; Al-Fayhaa; Al-Khaleej Al-Arabi; Al-Qurna; Al-Sadeq; Al-Zubair; Ghaz Al-Janoob; Kahrabaa Al-Hartha; Safwan; Umm Qasr	Al-Qurna; Al-Zubair

== Qualifiers within the Territories ==
The 27 qualified teams are divided into five groups according to the location, from each group, the first and second teams qualify directly to the final stage, with the exception of the seconds teams from the Northern, Western and Central Euphrates Groups, where they play among themselves so that one of the three teams qualifies for the final stage. For a total of eight qualified teams.

Locations of the 2021–22 Iraqi Second Division League teams in the Qualifiers within the Territories

Territories	Clubs participating	Club(s) remaining
Northern Group	Al-Amwaj Al-Mosuli; Al-Hawija; Baban^{[a]}; Mosul; Tuz^{[a]}	Al-Hawija
Western Group	Al-Dujail^{[a]}; Al-Jolan; Al-Khalis; Al-Sufiya; Balad Ruz	Al-Jolan; Al-Sufiya
Baghdad Group	Al-Etisalat; Al-Kadhimiya; Al-Khutoot; Al-Sikak; Al-Zafaraniyah; Masafi Al-Wasat	Al-Etisalat; Masafi Al-Wasat
Central Euphrates Group	Al Bdeir; Al-Ghadhriya; Al-Khidhir; Al-Kifl; Al-Meshkhab	Al-Khidhir
Southern Group	Al-Forat; Al-Numaniya; Al-Qurna; Al-Sukar; Al-Suwaira; Al-Zubair	Al-Sukar; Al-Suwaira

^{[a]} Baban, Tuz and Al-Dujail withdrew from the league at this stage.

== Final Qualifiers ==
The eight qualified teams have been divided into two groups, and the first two teams from each group will be promoted to Iraqi FirstDivision League.

=== Group 1 ===
Pos	Team	Pld	W	D	L	GF	GA	GD	Pts	Promotion	ETI	JOL	KHI	SUK
1	Al-Etisalat	6	4	1	1	14	8	+6	13	Promotion to the Iraqi First Division League		1–0	2–1	6–2
2	Al-Jolan	6	3	1	2	15	10	+5	10	Promotion to the Iraqi First Division League	2–2		3–0	2–1
3	Al-Khidhir	6	3	0	3	10	14	−4	9		3–2	4–2		2–1
4	Al-Sukar	6	1	0	5	10	17	−7	3		0–1	2–6	4–0	

Source: ISDLiraq
Legend: Blue = home team win; Yellow = draw; Red = away team win.
Rules for classification: 1) points; 2) head-to-head points; 3) head-to-head goal difference; 4) goal difference; 5) number of wins; 6) number of goals scored.

=== Group 2 ===
Pos	Team	Pld	W	D	L	GF	GA	GD	Pts	Promotion	HAW	MWT	SUF	SUW
1	Al-Hawija	6	4	1	1	10	4	+6	13	Promotion to the Iraqi First Division League		0–1	3–2	2–0
2	Masafi Al-Wasat	6	2	4	0	6	2	+4	10	Promotion to the Iraqi First Division League	1–1		1–1	3–0
3	Al-Sufiya	6	2	2	2	7	6	+1	8		0–1	0–0		1–0
4	Al-Suwaira	6	0	1	5	1	12	−11	1		0–3 (Note: The Al-Suwaira–Al-Hawija match was awarded as a 0–3 win to Al-Hawija, as Al-Suwaira did not turn up for the game.)	0–0	1–3	

Source: ISDLiraq
Legend: Blue = home team win; Yellow = draw; Red = away team win.
Rules for classification: 1) points; 2) head-to-head points; 3) head-to-head goal difference; 4) goal difference; 5) number of wins; 6) number of goals scored.

== Final ==
20 June 2022
15:00 GMT

Al-Etisalat	5 – 0	Al-Hawija
Hussein Ahmed 37'; Haider Ahmed 70'; Moamal Jawad 79'; Ali Jalal 83'; Ali Faez 89'	Report

Al-Shaab Stadium, Baghdad
