= 2020–21 Iraq FA Cup =

Tournament details
- Country: Iraq
- Dates: 18 October 2020 – 19 July 2021
- Teams: 126

Final positions
- Champions: Al-Quwa Al-Jawiya (5th title)
- Runners-up: Al-Zawraa

Tournament statistics
- Matches played: 124
- Goals scored: 370 (2.98 per match)

The 2020–21 Iraq FA Cup was the 31st edition of the Iraqi knockout football cup as a club competition, the main domestic cup in Iraqi football, featuring 126 teams (20 from the Iraqi Premier League and 106 from the Iraqi First Division League and Iraqi Second Division League). It started on 20 October 2020 and the final was played on 19 July 2021 at Al-Shaab Stadium in Baghdad.

The winners of the competition were Al-Quwa Al-Jawiya, who won their fifth title with a penalty shootout victory over Al-Zawraa, becoming the first Iraqi club to win the double since the 2001–02 season.

== Schedule ==
The rounds of the 2020–21 competition were scheduled as follows:

Round	Draw date	Match dates
First round	1 October 2020	18–20 October 2020
Second round	1 October 2020	23–24 October 2020
Third round	1 October 2020	27–28 October 2020
Fourth round	1 October 2020	3–4 November 2020
Round of 32	9 November 2020	16–18 November 2020
Round of 16	9 November 2020	25–26 March 2021
Quarter-finals	9 November 2020	3–4 June 2021
Semi-finals	9 November 2020	10–11 June 2021
Final	9 November 2020	19 July 2021

== First round ==
Al-Tijara, Al-Atheer, Jisr Diyala, Al-Baiyaa, Al-Kadhimiya, Al-Nasr wal-Salam, Al-Najda, Al-Ghadhriya, Qalat Saleh, Ahrar Maysan and Al-Sumoud received byes to the second round.

Baghdad Section

18 October 2020	Haifa	2–0	Al-Zafaraniya	Baghdad
				Stadium: Haifa Stadium; Referee: Rasoul Ali

18 October 2020	Himayat Al-Munshaat	1–4	Al-Taji	Baghdad
				Stadium: Al-Wala Stadium; Referee: Ahmed Kadhim

18 October 2020	Biladi	1–1 (L–W p)	Al-Taliea	Baghdad
				Stadium: Al-Ghazaliya Stadium; Referee: Mohammed Riyadh

18 October 2020	Al-Musayyib	6–0	Gharb Baghdad	Baghdad
				Stadium: Al-Awal Stadium; Referee: Muntaser Ghazi

18 October 2020	Al-Muroor	5–1	Al-Umal	Baghdad
				Stadium: Natiq Hashim Stadium; Referee: Salam Jumaa

18 October 2020	Masafi Al-Wasat	4–0	Bismaya	Baghdad
				Stadium: Al-Masafi Stadium; Referee: Ahmed Jumaa

18 October 2020	Al-Mahmoudiya	1–1 (3–1 p)	Abu Ghraib	Baghdad
				Stadium: Abu Ghraib Stadium; Referee: Mustafa Muhanna

18 October 2020	Al-Iskan	1–5	Jabla	Baghdad
				Stadium: Al-Baiyaa Stadium; Referee: Mohammed Kamel

18 October 2020	Junoob Baghdad	1–1 (5–4 p)	Al-Sihha wal-Bi'a	Baghdad

18 October 2020	Jenaain Babil	2–2 (3–2 p)	Shabab Al-Iraq	Hilla
				Stadium: Al-Iskan Stadium

18 October 2020	Al-Majd	0–3 (w/o)	Al-Dhafar	Baghdad

Southern and Central Euphrates Section

18 October 2020	Al-Nasiriya	0–3 (w/o)	Al-Suwaira

18 October 2020	Al-Kifl	1–1 (1–3 p)	Al-Noor

18 October 2020	Medinat Al-Shuhadaa	1–0	Al-Numaniya

18 October 2020	Al-Hindiya	3–2	Baladiyat Al-Basra

18 October 2020	Abi Al-Khaseeb	1–2	Babil
	Goal		Ali; Qais

18 October 2020	Al-Sadda	1–3	Al-Izdihar

18 October 2020	Al-Neel	0–4	Uruk

18 October 2020	Al-Maqal	4–1	Kahrabaa Al-Hartha

18 October 2020	Al-Zaeem	5–1	Al-Shamiya	Al-Suwaira Stadium
	Jabbar; Karim; Ahmed; Ali; Hussein

18 October 2020	Al-Mashroua	0–0 (5–6 p)	Al-Qurna	Hilla

18 October 2020	Al-Shabab Al-Basri	4–1	Al-Sharqiya	Basra
14:00 UTC+03:00	Fayadh; Ghassan; Hussein		Goal Penalty missed	Stadium: Al-Shahab Al-Basri Stadium

18 October 2020	Al-Jamahir	1–0	Al-Sadeq

Western Section

18 October 2020	Jalawla	3–2	Qazaniya	Jalawla
14:00 UTC+03:00				Stadium: Jalawla Stadium; Referee: Shamil Tahseen

19 October 2020	Hit	1–1 (W–L p)	Al-Ramadi	Hit
14:00 UTC+03:00				Stadium: Hit Stadium; Referee: Mohammed Riyadh

19 October 2020	Anah	4–2	Bilad Al-Rafidain	Anah
14:00 UTC+03:00				Stadium: Anah Stadium; Referee: Ali Hadi Salih

19 October 2020	Haditha	0–2	Balad Ruz	Haditha
14:00 UTC+03:00				Stadium: Haditha Stadium; Referee: Muntaser Ghazi

19 October 2020	Habbaniyat Al-Sumoud	2–2 (L–W p)	Al-Jolan	Habbaniya
14:00 UTC+03:00				Stadium: Habbaniyat Al-Sumoud Stadium; Referee: Mohsin Abdul-Karim

19 October 2020	Al-Khalis	3–0	Al-Yarmouk	Al-Khalis
14:00 UTC+03:00				Stadium: Al-Khalis Stadium; Referee: Hassan Ali

19 October 2020	Al-Mansouriya	3–1	Al-Mushahada	Al-Mansouriya
14:00 UTC+03:00				Stadium: Al-Mansouriya Stadium; Referee: Ahsan Sami

19 October 2020	A'ali Al-Furat	2–2 (W–L p)	Bani Saad	Falluja
14:00 UTC+03:00				Stadium: Al-Falluja Stadium; Referee: Haider Ali Khalid

19 October 2020	Al-Wajihiya	2–0	Jazeerat Al-Khalidiya	Balad
14:00 UTC+03:00				Stadium: Kuliya Balad Al-Rafidain Stadium; Referee: Haider Najim

19 October 2020	Al-Fahad	1–2	Al-Sufiya	Al-Nasr Stadium
14:00 UTC+03:00				Referee: Haider Rahem

19 October 2020	Al-Raed	1–3	Shahraban	Habbaniya
14:00 UTC+03:00				Stadium: Al-Habbaniya Stadium; Referee: Ali Hadi Majisar

Northern Section

18 October 2020	Al-Shirqat	3–0 (w/o)	Baba Gurgur

18 October 2020	Ittihad Al-Hawija	0–2	Tuz

18 October 2020	Taza	2–1	Altun Kupri

18 October 2020	Al-Dibis	4–2	Rabia

18 October 2020	Baban	2–1	Al-Oruba

18 October 2020	Al-Thawra	1–5	Musalla

18 October 2020	Umal Nineveh	1–3	Al-Amwaj Al-Mosuli

18 October 2020	Tikrit	1–2	Balad

19 October 2020	Newroz	4–2	Wahid Huzairan

19 October 2020	Al-Hawija	4–1	Khak

19 October 2020	Baladiyat Al-Mosul	1–1 (4–2 p)	Al-Alam
	(pen.)

20 October 2020	Ghaz Al-Shamal	2–1	Tarmi

20 October 2020	Sahl Nineveh	2–1	Al-Riyadh

== Second round ==
Al-Taliea, Al-Musayyib, Masafi Al-Wasat, Jabla, Jenaain Babil, Al-Suwaira, Al-Noor and Baladiyat Al-Mosul received byes to the third round.

Baghdad Section

23 October 2020	Al-Taji	0–1	Haifa	Baghdad
14:00 UTC+03:00				Stadium: Al-Taji Stadium

23 October 2020	Al-Tijara	0–2	Al-Atheer	Baghdad
14:00 UTC+03:00				Stadium: Al-Baiyaa Stadium

23 October 2020	Jisr Diyala	1–1 (2–3 p)	Al-Muroor	Baghdad
14:00 UTC+03:00				Stadium: Jisr Diyala Stadium

23 October 2020	Al-Mahmoudiya	4–0	Al-Baiyaa	Baghdad
14:00 UTC+03:00				Stadium: Al-Mahmoudiya Stadium

23 October 2020	Al-Kadhimiya	2–2 (5–4 p)	Junoob Baghdad	Baghdad
14:00 UTC+03:00				Stadium: Al-Kadhimiya Stadium

23 October 2020	Al-Dhafar	1–2	Al-Nasr wal-Salam	Baghdad
14:00 UTC+03:00				Stadium: Al-Tahadi Stadium

Southern and Central Euphrates Section

23 October 2020	Medinat Al-Shuhadaa	3–0 (w/o)	Al-Najma	Basra
14:00 UTC+03:00				Stadium: Medinat Al-Shuhadaa Stadium

23 October 2020	Al-Hindiya	1–0	Al-Ghadhriya	Karbala
14:00 UTC+03:00				Stadium: Al-Hindiya Stadium

23 October 2020	Al-Izdihar	0–0 (L–W p)	Qalat Saleh	Najaf
14:00 UTC+03:00				Stadium: Al-Izdihar Stadium

23 October 2020	Uruk	3–2	Ahrar Maysan	Samawa
14:00 UTC+03:00				Stadium: Uruk Stadium

23 October 2020	Al-Qurna	1–1 (4–3 p)	Al-Zaeem	Basra
14:00 UTC+03:00				Stadium: Al-Qurna Stadium

23 October 2020	Al-Jamahir	2–1	Al-Shabab Al-Basri	Karbala
14:00 UTC+03:00				Stadium: Al-Jamahir Stadium

Western Section

24 October 2020	Anah	2–2 (L–W p)	Hit	Anah
14:00 UTC+03:00				Stadium: Anah Stadium

24 October 2020	Al-Jolan	1–1 (W–L p)	Balad Ruz	Al-Anbar
14:00 UTC+03:00				Stadium: Al-Jolan Stadium

24 October 2020	Jalawla	1–3	Al-Khalis	Jalawla
14:00 UTC+03:00				Stadium: Jalawla Stadium

24 October 2020	A'ali Al-Furat	0–0 (6–5 p)	Al-Mansouriya	A'ali Al-Furat Stadium
14:00 UTC+03:00

24 October 2020	Shahraban	2–1	Al-Sumoud	Diyala
14:00 UTC+03:00				Stadium: Shahraban Stadium

24 October 2020	Al-Sufiya	3–0	Al-Wajihiya	Al-Anbar
14:00 UTC+03:00				Stadium: Al-Sufiya Stadium

Northern Section

24 October 2020	Ghaz Al-Shamal	0–0 (3–4 p)	Balad	Kirkuk
14:00 UTC+03:00				Stadium: Ghaz Al-Shamal Stadium

24 October 2020	Sahl Nineveh	3–0	Taza	Nineveh
14:00 UTC+03:00				Stadium: Sahl Nineveh Stadium

24 October 2020	Tuz	0–4	Newroz	Tuz Khurmatu
14:00 UTC+03:00				Stadium: Al-Tuz Stadium

24 October 2020	Al-Shirqat	2–1	Al-Dibis	Salahaddin
14:00 UTC+03:00				Stadium: Al-Shirqat Stadium

24 October 2020	Musalla	2–2 (W–L p)	Baban	Kirkuk
14:00 UTC+03:00	Yaseen		Goal	Stadium: Musalla Stadium

24 October 2020	Al-Hawija	2–2 (L–W p)	Al-Amwaj Al-Mosuli	Hawija
14:00 UTC+03:00				Stadium: Al-Hawija Stadium

== Third round ==
Haifa and Al-Amwaj Al-Mosuli received byes to the fourth round.

Baghdad Section

27 October 2020	Al-Atheer	4–1	Al-Taliea	Baghdad
14:00 UTC+03:00				Stadium: Al-Tahadi Stadium

27 October 2020	Al-Muroor	6–1	Al-Musayyib	Baghdad
14:00 UTC+03:00				Stadium: Natiq Hashim Stadium

27 October 2020	Masafi Al-Wasat	4–0	Al-Mahmoudiya	Baghdad
14:00 UTC+03:00				Stadium: Al-Masafi Stadium

27 October 2020	Jabla	0–0 (3–4 p)	Al-Kadhimiya	Baghdad
14:00 UTC+03:00				Stadium: Jabla Stadium

27 October 2020	Al-Nasr wal-Salam	1–2	Jenaain Babil	Baghdad
14:00 UTC+03:00				Stadium: Abu Ghraib Stadium

Southern and Central Euphrates Section

27 October 2020	Al-Noor	6–2	Medinat Al-Shuhadaa	Basra
14:00 UTC+03:00				Stadium: Al-Noor Stadium

27 October 2020	Al-Suwaira	0–1	Al-Hindiya	Al-Suwaira
14:00 UTC+03:00				Stadium: Al-Suwaira Stadium

27 October 2020	Uruk	1–2	Al-Maqal	Muthanna
14:00 UTC+03:00				Stadium: Al-Muthanna Stadium

27 October 2020	Al-Jamahir	3–0 (w/o)	Al-Qurna	Karbala
14:00 UTC+03:00				Stadium: Al-Jamahir Stadium
Note: The match originally ended in a 3–0 win for Al-Qurna but was changed to a 3–0 win for Al-Jamahir due to Al-Qurna fielding an ineligible player.

28 October 2020	Babil	2–1	Qalat Saleh	Babil
14:00 UTC+03:00				Stadium: Al-Kifl Stadium

Western Section

28 October 2020	Al-Jolan	2–0	Hit	Al-Anbar
14:00 UTC+03:00				Stadium: Al-Jolan Stadium

28 October 2020	Shahraban	2–1	Al-Sufiya	Diyala
14:00 UTC+03:00				Stadium: Shahraban Stadium

28 October 2020	Al-Khalis	1–0	A'ali Al-Furat	Al-Khalis
14:00 UTC+03:00				Stadium: Al-Khalis Stadium

Northern Section

28 October 2020	Newroz	9–0	Sahl Nineveh	Sulaymaniya
14:00 UTC+03:00				Stadium: Newroz Stadium

28 October 2020	Balad	1–0	Baladiyat Al-Mosul	Balad
14:00 UTC+03:00				Stadium: Balad Stadium

28 October 2020	Musalla	0–2	Al-Shirqat	Kirkuk
14:00 UTC+03:00				Stadium: Musalla Stadium

== Fourth round ==
Al-Jamahir, Al-Jolan, Shahraban, Al-Khalis, Newroz and Al-Shirqat received byes to the Round of 32.

Baghdad Section

3 November 2020	Haifa	0–1	Al-Atheer	Baghdad
14:00 UTC+03:00				Stadium: Haifa Stadium

3 November 2020	Masafi Al-Wasat	2–1	Al-Muroor	Baghdad
14:00 UTC+03:00				Stadium: Al-Masafi Stadium

3 November 2020	Al-Kadhimiya	0–1	Jenaain Babil	Baghdad
14:00 UTC+03:00				Stadium: Al-Kadhimiya Stadium

Southern and Central Euphrates Section

3 November 2020	Al-Hindiya	2–1	Al-Noor	Karbala
14:00 UTC+03:00				Stadium: Al-Hindiya Stadium

3 November 2020	Al-Maqal	0–4	Babil	Basra
14:00 UTC+03:00				Stadium: Al-Maqal Stadium

Northern Section

4 November 2020	Al-Amwaj Al-Mosuli	3–0	Balad	Mosul
14:00 UTC+03:00				Stadium: University of Mosul Stadium

== Final phase ==
=== Bracket ===
Round of 32; 16–18 November 2020
Al-Sinaat Al-Kahrabaiya	1
Naft Al-Wasat	0
Al-Amwaj Al-Mosuli	1
Zakho	4
Masafi Al-Wasat	0
Al-Quwa Al-Jawiya	2
Al-Jolan	0
Al-Najaf	4
Al-Shirqat (w/o)	3
Al-Samawa	0
Al-Hindiya	0
Al-Karkh	4
Shahraban	0
Naft Al-Basra	6
Al-Qasim	3
Al-Kahrabaa	0
Amanat Baghdad (p)	0 (5)
Al-Diwaniya	0 (4)
Al-Khalis	0
Al-Shorta	5
Al-Jamahir	0
Al-Minaa	1
Newroz (w/o)	3
Al-Talaba	0
Babil	1 (1)
Al-Hudood (p)	1 (2)
Al-Atheer	0
Al-Naft	6
Jenaain Babil	0
Al-Zawraa	1
Erbil (p)	0 (3)
Naft Maysan	0 (1)

Round of 16; 25–26 March 2021
Zakho (w/o)	3
Al-Sinaat Al-Kahrabaiya	0
Al-Quwa Al-Jawiya (p)	0 (4)
Al-Najaf	0 (3)
Al-Karkh	1
Al-Shirqat	0
Naft Al-Basra	1
Al-Qasim	0
Al-Shorta (p)	0 (8)
Amanat Baghdad	0 (7)
Al-Minaa (w/o)	3
Newroz	0
Al-Hudood (p)	1 (4)
Al-Naft	1 (3)
Al-Zawraa (p)	0 (5)
Erbil	0 (4)

Quarter-finals; 3–4 June 2021
Zakho	0 (3)
Al-Quwa Al-Jawiya (p)	0 (5)
Al-Karkh	2
Naft Al-Basra	1
Al-Shorta	2
Al-Minaa	1
Al-Hudood	0 (5)
Al-Zawraa (p)	0 (6)

Semi-finals; 10–11 June 2021
Al-Quwa Al-Jawiya	2
Al-Karkh	1
Al-Shorta	0
Al-Zawraa	2

Final; 19 July 2021
Al-Quwa Al-Jawiya (p)	0 (4)
Al-Zawraa	0 (2)

== Round of 32 ==
20 top-tier teams and 12 lower-tier teams competed in this round.

16 November 2020	Babil	1–1 (1–2 p)	Al-Hudood	Babil
14:00 UTC+03:00	Ali 70'		Abbas 85'; Muqdad (yellow card) (yellow-red card)	Stadium: Al-Kifl Stadium

17 November 2020	Al-Amwaj Al-Mosuli	1–4	Zakho	Duhok
14:00 UTC+03:00			Salim (pen.); Zero; Castañeda	Stadium: Duhok Stadium

17 November 2020	Al-Sinaat Al-Kahrabaiya	1–0	Naft Al-Wasat	Baghdad
14:00 UTC+03:00	Ahmed 63'			Stadium: Al-Sinaa Stadium

17 November 2020	Al-Jolan	0–4	Al-Najaf	Baghdad
14:00 UTC+03:00			Ali; Lafta; Ahmed; Kadhim (pen.)	Stadium: Amanat Baghdad Stadium

17 November 2020	Al-Qasim	3–0	Al-Kahrabaa	Babil
14:00 UTC+03:00	Hameed; Salih; Sabah			Stadium: Al-Kifl Stadium

17 November 2020	Al-Atheer	0–6	Al-Naft	Baghdad
14:00 UTC+03:00			Sartib (pen.); Raad; Hakeem; Adnan; Hussein (pen.)	Stadium: Al-Saher Ahmed Radhi Stadium

17 November 2020	Al-Shirqat	3–0 (w/o)	Al-Samawa	Erbil
14:00 UTC+03:00				Stadium: Franso Hariri Stadium

17 November 2020	Al-Khalis	0–5	Al-Shorta	Baghdad
14:00 UTC+03:00			Jalal 10', 69'; J. Mohammed 31'; M. Mohammed 65', 72'	Stadium: Al-Taji Stadium

17 November 2020	Al-Hindiya	0–4	Al-Karkh	Babil
18:00 UTC+03:00			Abdul-Amir; Abdul-Rahman; Khalil; Karim	Stadium: Al-Kifl Stadium

18 November 2020	Newroz	3–0 (w/o)	Al-Talaba	Sulaymaniya
14:00 UTC+03:00				Stadium: Sulaymaniya Stadium

18 November 2020	Amanat Baghdad	0–0 (5–4 p)	Al-Diwaniya	Baghdad
14:00 UTC+03:00				Stadium: Amanat Baghdad Stadium

18 November 2020	Jenaain Babil	0–1	Al-Zawraa	Babil
14:00 UTC+03:00			Shwan 65'; Yaseen (red card) 70'	Stadium: Al-Kifl Stadium

18 November 2020	Masafi Al-Wasat	0–2	Al-Quwa Al-Jawiya	Baghdad
14:00 UTC+03:00			Jassim 68'; Ali Bari 85'	Stadium: Al-Saher Ahmed Radhi Stadium

18 November 2020	Erbil	0–0 (3–1 p)	Naft Maysan	Erbil
14:00 UTC+03:00				Stadium: Franso Hariri Stadium

18 November 2020	Shahraban	0–6	Naft Al-Basra	Baghdad
14:00 UTC+03:00			Zuhair; Sari; Farhan; Zamil; Rubat; Ali	Stadium: Al-Taji Stadium

18 November 2020	Al-Jamahir	0–1	Al-Minaa	Babil
18:00 UTC+03:00			Mohsin 3'	Stadium: Al-Kifl Stadium

== Round of 16 ==
14 top-tier teams and 2 lower-tier teams competed in this round.

25 March 2021	Al-Hudood	1–1 (4–3 p)	Al-Naft	Baghdad
15:00 UTC+03:00	Hadi 73'		Kareem 30'	Stadium: Al-Taji Stadium; Referee: Ahmed Kadhim
	Penalties
	Taha (penalty scored); Mazin (penalty scored); Nathaniel (penalty scored); Salem (penalty missed); Abdul-Karim (penalty scored)		(penalty scored) Abdul-Amir; (penalty scored) Hussein; (penalty missed) Kareem; (penalty scored) Adnan; (penalty missed) Mohsen

25 March 2021	Naft Al-Basra	1–0	Al-Qasim	Basra
15:00 UTC+03:00	Madyen 87'			Stadium: Al-Fayhaa Stadium; Referee: Hamid Talib

25 March 2021	Al-Shorta	0–0 (8–7 p)	Amanat Baghdad	Karbala
17:30 UTC+03:00				Stadium: Karbala International Stadium; Referee: Mohamed Salman
	Penalties
	Al-Youssef (penalty scored); Rivas (penalty scored); Ali (penalty scored); Abdul-Amir (penalty scored); Mohammed (penalty scored); Hameed (penalty missed); Ghalib (penalty scored); Amer (penalty scored); Kadhim (penalty scored)		(penalty scored) Kareem; (penalty scored) Oliver; (penalty scored) Arzeij; (penalty scored) Salam; (penalty scored) Rzaiej; (penalty missed) Iko; (penalty scored) Hussein; (penalty scored) Jabbar; (penalty missed) Falah

25 March 2021	Al-Minaa	3–0 (w/o)	Newroz	Basra
18:00 UTC+03:00				Stadium: Al-Fayhaa Stadium

26 March 2021	Al-Quwa Al-Jawiya	0–0 (4–3 p)	Al-Najaf	Baghdad
15:00 UTC+03:00				Stadium: Al-Taji Stadium; Referee: Haitham Mohammed Ali
	Penalties
	Ahmed (penalty scored); Collazos (penalty scored); Radhi (penalty missed); Mohsen (penalty scored); Zamel (penalty scored)		(penalty missed) Hameed; (penalty scored) Akakpo; (penalty missed) Baffour; (penalty scored) Mousa; (penalty scored) Moayad

26 March 2021	Zakho	3–0 (w/o)	Al-Sinaat Al-Kahrabaiya	Zakho
15:00 UTC+03:00				Stadium: Zakho International Stadium

26 March 2021	Al-Karkh	1–0	Al-Shirqat	Baghdad
15:00 UTC+03:00	Qasim 43'			Stadium: Al-Saher Ahmed Radhi Stadium; Attendance: Mohammed Sadeq

26 March 2021	Al-Zawraa	0–0 (5–4 p)	Erbil	Karbala
17:30 UTC+03:00				Stadium: Karbala International Stadium; Referee: Wathik Mohammed Al-Baag
	Penalties
	Ridha (penalty scored); Abdul-Raheem (penalty scored); Moukoro (penalty scored); Shwan (penalty scored); Houbeib (penalty scored)		(penalty scored) Weitzer; (penalty scored) Baez; (penalty scored) Sherzad; (penalty scored) Airton; (penalty missed) Sami

== Quarter-finals ==
All remaining teams are from the top-tier.

3 June 2021	Al-Karkh	2–1	Naft Al-Basra	Baghdad
16:30 UTC+03:00	Abdukareem 51'; Qasim 59'		Farhan 74'	Stadium: Al-Saher Ahmed Radhi Stadium; Referee: Haitham Mohammed Ali

3 June 2021	Al-Zawraa	0–0 (6–5 p)	Al-Hudood	Baghdad
20:00 UTC+03:00				Stadium: Al-Shaab Stadium; Referee: Salam Amer
	Penalties
	Mohsin (penalty scored); Raad (penalty scored); Abdul-Raheem (penalty scored); Hassan (penalty scored); Ridha (penalty scored); Qasim (penalty scored)		(penalty scored) Taha; (penalty scored) Fandi; (penalty scored) Mazin; (penalty scored) Muqdad; (penalty scored) Nathaniel; (penalty missed) Abdul-Hussein

4 June 2021	Zakho	0–0 (3–5 p)	Al-Quwa Al-Jawiya	Zakho
16:30 UTC+03:00				Stadium: Zakho International Stadium; Referee: Yousif Saeed Hasan
	Penalties
	Esquerdinha (penalty scored); Monteiro (penalty missed); Lima (penalty scored); Kadhim (penalty scored)		(penalty scored) Collazos; (penalty scored) El Ani; (penalty scored) Kadhim; (penalty scored) Maan; (penalty scored) Radhi

4 June 2021	Al-Shorta	2–1	Al-Minaa	Baghdad
20:00 UTC+03:00	Yousif 27'; Al-Youssef 31'		Jassim 34'	Stadium: Al-Shaab Stadium; Referee: Wathik Mohammed Al-Baag

== Semi-finals ==
10 June 2021	Al-Shorta	0–2	Al-Zawraa	Baghdad
20:00 UTC+03:00			Mohammed 8' (o.g.); Ridha 24'; Fadhel (yellow card) 26' (yellow-red card) 35'	Stadium: Al-Shaab Stadium; Referee: Mohamed Salman

11 June 2021	Al-Quwa Al-Jawiya	2–1	Al-Karkh	Baghdad
21:30 UTC+03:00	Elvis 35' (o.g.); Ahmed 59', (penalty missed) 62'		Moussa (red card) 46'; Abdulkareem 86'	Stadium: Al-Shaab Stadium; Referee: Wathik Mohammed Al-Baag

== Final ==
19 July 2021
20:30 UTC+03:00

Al-Zawraa	0–0	Al-Quwa Al-Jawiya
Penalties
Raad (penalty missed); Kamel (penalty scored); Ismail (penalty scored); Abdul-Raheem (penalty missed)	2–4	(penalty scored) Haddad; (penalty scored) Bayesh; (penalty scored) El Ani; (penalty scored) Ahmed

Al-Shaab Stadium, Baghdad
Referee: Wathik Mohammed Al-Baag

Iraq FA Cup
2020–21 winner
Al-Quwa Al-Jawiya
5th title
