= 2021 Iraq FA Cup final =

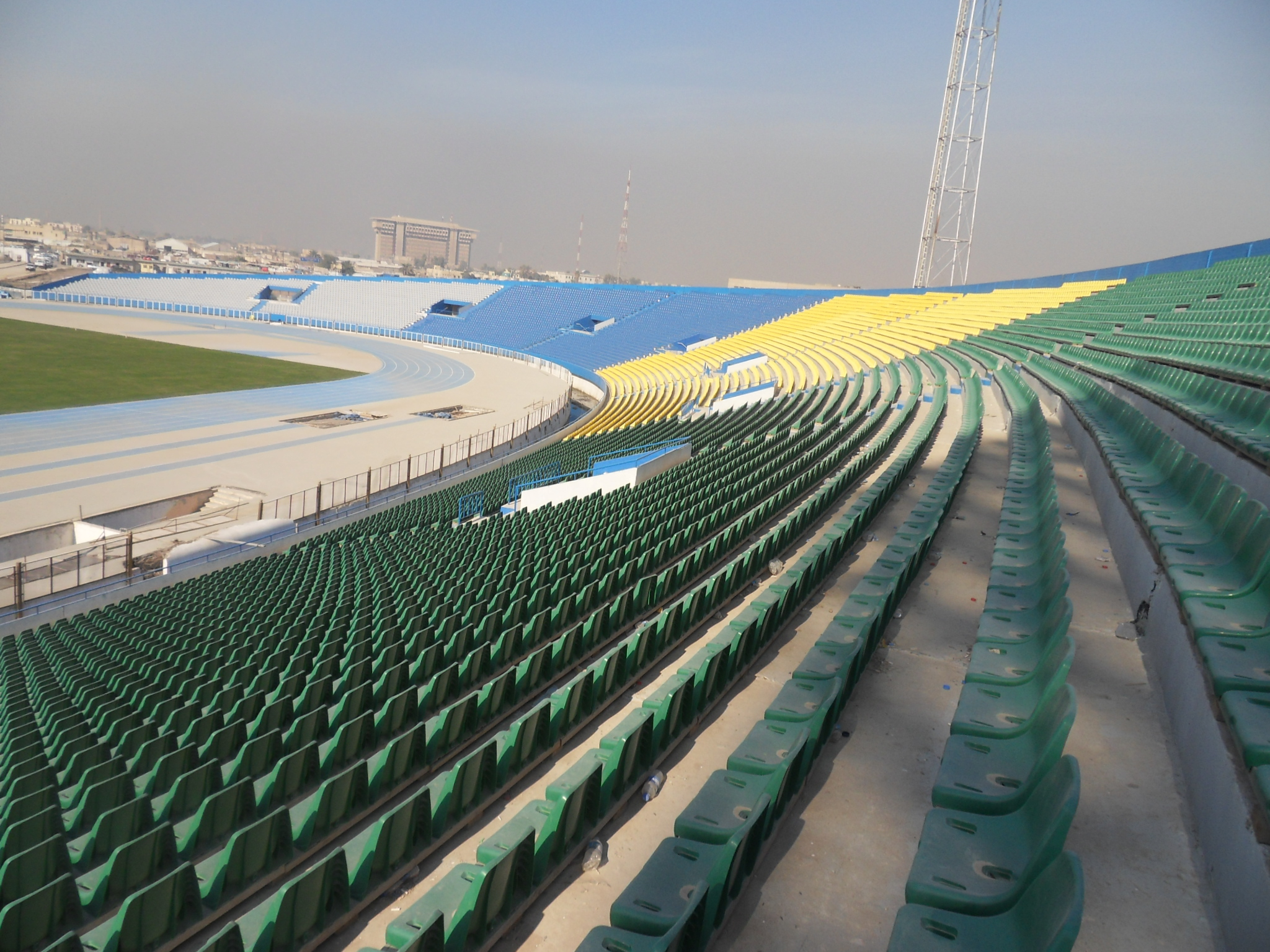
- The match took place at Al-Shaab Stadium
- Event: 2020–21 Iraq FA Cup
Al-Zawraa	Al-Quwa Al-Jawiya
0	0
- Al-Quwa Al-Jawiya won 4–2 on penalties
- Date: 19 July 2021
- Venue: Al-Shaab Stadium, Baghdad
- Man of the Match: Karrar Nabeel (Al-Quwa Al-Jawiya)
- Referee: Wathik Mohammed Al-Baag

The 2021 Iraq FA Cup final was the 28th final of the Iraq FA Cup as a club competition. The match was contested between Al-Zawraa and Al-Quwa Al-Jawiya, at Al-Shaab Stadium in Baghdad. It was played on 19 July 2021 to be the final match of the competition. Al-Zawraa made their record 19th appearance in the Iraq FA Cup final while Al-Quwa Al-Jawiya made their eighth appearance.

Al-Quwa Al-Jawiya won 4–2 on penalties after a 0–0 draw for the club's fifth title, becoming the first team since the 2001–02 season to win the double of Iraqi Premier League and Iraq FA Cup.

== Route to the Final ==
Note: In all results below, the score of the finalist is given first (H: home; A: away; N: neutral).

Al-Zawraa		Round	Al-Quwa Al-Jawiya	
Opponent	Result	2020–21 Iraq FA Cup	Opponent	Result
Jenaain Babil	1–0 (A)	Round of 32	Masafi Al-Wasat	2–0 (A)
Erbil	0–0 (5–4 p.) (H)	Round of 16	Al-Najaf	0–0 (4–3 p.) (H)
Al-Hudood	0–0 (6–5 p.) (H)	Quarter-finals	Zakho	0–0 (5–3 p.) (A)
Al-Shorta	2–0 (N)	Semi-finals	Al-Karkh	2–1 (H)

== Match ==
=== Details ===
19 July 2021
20:30 UTC+03:00

Al-Zawraa	0–0	Al-Quwa Al-Jawiya
Penalties
Raad (penalty missed); Kamel (penalty scored); Ismail (penalty scored); Abdul-Raheem (penalty missed)	2–4	(penalty scored) Haddad; (penalty scored) Bayesh; (penalty scored) El Ani; (penalty scored) Ahmed

Al-Shaab Stadium, Baghdad
Referee: Wathik Mohammed Al-Baag

Al-Zawraa	Al-Quwa Al-Jawiya

GK	31	(Iraq) Ali Yasin
RB	32	(Iraq) Alaa Raad
CB	29	(Iraq) Abbas Qasim	(yellow card) 24'
CB	16	(Syria) Zaher Midani
LB	11	(Iraq) Dhurgham Ismail
RM	5	(Iraq) Muntadher Mohammed
CM	21	(Iraq) Mohammed Salih
CM	25	(Iraq) Ali Raheem
LM	9	(Iraq) Hussein Ali
CF	88	(Iraq) Mohannad Abdul-Raheem
CF	10	(Iraq) Alaa Abdul-Zahra (c)		(substituted off) 77'
Substitutes:
GK	20	(Iraq) Alaa Gatea
DF	2	(Iraq) Mustafa Mohammed
DF	3	(Iraq) Ahmed Maknzi
DF	14	(Iraq) Najm Shwan
DF	27	(Iraq) Mohammed Abdul-Karim
MF	6	(Iraq) Mohammed Ridha
MF	19	(Iraq) Mahdi Kamel		(substituted on) 77'
FW	17	(Iraq) Emad Mohsin
FW	18	(Mauritania) Sidi Touda
Manager:
(Iraq) Radhi Shenaishil

GK	1	(Iraq) Fahad Talib		(substituted off) 90+2'
RWB	6	(Iraq) Sameh Saeed
CB	13	(Jordan) Ihsan Haddad
CB	2	(Iraq) Ahmad Ibrahim (c)
CB	5	(Iraq) Maitham Jabbar
LWB	11	(Iraq) Humam Tariq
RM	8	(Iraq) Ibrahim Bayesh
CM	16	(Iraq) Karrar Nabeel
CM	25	(Iraq) Mohammed Ali Abbood		(substituted off) 90'
LM	28	(Iraq) Hussein Jabbar		(substituted off) 90'
CF	9	(Iraq) Aymen Hussein	(yellow card) 15'
Substitutes:
GK	95	(Iraq) Mohammed Salih		(substituted on) 90+2'
DF	3	(Iraq) Ali Bahjat
DF	20	(Iraq) Ali Kadhim
DF	34	(Iraq) Mustafa Maan
MF	18	(Iraq) Louaï El Ani		(substituted on) 90'
MF	19	(Iraq) Ali Mohsen
MF	55	(Iraq) Mohammed Zamel
FW	10	(Iraq) Hammadi Ahmed		(substituted on) 90'
FW	29	(Iraq) Amjad Radhi
Manager:
(Iraq) Ayoub Odisho

Man of the Match:
Karrar Nabeel (Al-Quwa Al-Jawiya)

Assistant referees:
Jihad Attieh Dawood
Amir Dawood Hussein
Fourth official:
Mohamed Salman Al-Noori

Match rules

- 90 minutes.
- Penalty shoot-out if scores still level.
- Nine named substitutes, of which up to five may be used.
