= 2019–20 Iraq FA Cup =

Tournament details
- Country: Iraq
- Teams: 68

Final positions
- Champions: N/A (tournament cancelled)

Tournament statistics
- Matches played: 51
- Goals scored: 104 (2.04 per match)

The 2019–20 Iraq FA Cup was the 30th edition of the Iraqi knockout football cup as a club competition, the main domestic cup in Iraqi football, featuring a total of 20 teams from the Iraqi Premier League and 48 teams from the Iraqi First Division League and Iraqi Second Division League. The tournament started on 12 September 2019, but was cancelled during the Round of 32 because of the COVID-19 pandemic.

== Format ==
=== Participation ===
The cup started with the first round, consisting of 48 teams from the Iraqi First Division League and Iraqi Second Division League, followed by the second round, consisting of the 24 qualified teams. The 20 Iraqi Premier League clubs joined the 12 qualified teams to form the Round of 32.

=== Cards ===
If a player received a second yellow card, they were banned from the next cup match. If a player received a red card, they were banned for a minimum of one match, but more could be added by the Iraq Football Association.

== Participating clubs ==
The following 68 teams were participating in the competition:

**Iraqi Premier League**; 20 clubs from the 2019–20 season	**Iraqi First Division League / Iraqi Second Division League**; 48 clubs from the 2019–20 season
**Al-Diwaniya**; Al-Hudood; **Al-Kahrabaa**; Al-Karkh; Al-Minaa; **Al-Naft**; Al-Najaf; **Al-Qasim**; **Al-Quwa Al-Jawiya**; **Al-Samawa**; **Al-Shorta**; **Al-Sinaat Al-Kahrabaiya**; **Al-Talaba**; **Al-Zawraa**; Amanat Baghdad; **Erbil**; **Naft Al-Junoob**; **Naft Al-Wasat**; **Naft Maysan**; **Zakho**	Al-Alam; Al-Amir; Al-Baladi; Al-Hakim; Al-Hamza; Al-Hawija; Al-Hurr; Al-Husseiniya; Al-Kadhimiya; **Al-Kifl**; Al-Kufa; Al-Kut; Al-Mahmoudiya; Al-Maqal; Al-Mosul; Al-Muroor; Al-Najma; Al-Nasr wal-Salam; Al-Noor; Al-Rawdhatain; Al-Sadeq; Al-Sihha wal-Bi'a; Al-Shabab; Al-Sufiya; Al-Tijara; Al-Taji; Anah; Babil; Balad; Baladiyat Al-Basra; Baladiyat Al-Nasiriya; Bani Saad; Baquba; Biladi; Bismaya; **Diyala**; Haifa; Hibhib; Jalawla; Jisr Diyala; Junoob Baghdad; Medinat Al-Shuhadaa; Masafi Al-Wasat; Shabab Al-Iraq; Shahraban; Suq Al-Shuyukh; Taza; Tuz

- **Bold** indicates the team is still in the competition.

== Schedule ==
The rounds of the 2019–20 competition were scheduled as follows:

Round	Draw date	Match dates
First round	25 August 2019	12–13 September 2019
Second round	25 August 2019	17–20 September 2019
Round of 32	30 September 2019	9 October 2019 – N/A
Round of 16	30 September 2019	N/A
Quarter-finals	30 September 2019	N/A
Semi-finals	30 September 2019	N/A
Final	30 September 2019	N/A

== First round ==
48 teams from the First Division League and Second Division League competed in this round.

12 September 2019	Al-Taji	0–0 (W–L p)	Anah	Baghdad
12:30 GMT				Stadium: Al-Taji Stadium

12 September 2019	Shahraban	0–0 (3–5 p)	Al-Sadeq	Miqdadiya
12:30 GMT				Stadium: Al-Miqdadiya Stadium

12 September 2019	Al-Alam	1–1 (W–L p)	Al-Nasr wal-Salam	Al-Alam
12:30 GMT				Stadium: Al-Alam Stadium

12 September 2019	Al-Najma	0–0 (W–L p)	Al-Kut	Diwaniya
12:30 GMT				Stadium: Al-Najma Stadium

12 September 2019	Biladi	0–0 (L–W p)	Al-Maqal	Baghdad
12:30 GMT				Stadium: Haifa Stadium

12 September 2019	Taza	0–0 (4–3 p)	Al-Husseiniya	Kirkuk
12:30 GMT				Stadium: Ghaz Al-Shamal Stadium

12 September 2019	Balad	1–0	Haifa	Balad
12:30 GMT				Stadium: Balad Stadium

12 September 2019	Al-Mahmoudiya	1–1 (W–L p)	Masafi Al-Wasat	Mahmoudiya
12:30 GMT				Stadium: Al-Mahmoudiya Stadium

12 September 2019	Diyala	4–0	Hibhib	Hibhib
12:30 GMT				Stadium: Hibhib Stadium

12 September 2019	Al-Kadhimiya	0–0 (W–L p)	Al-Baladi	Baghdad
12:30 GMT				Stadium: Al-Kadhimiya Stadium

12 September 2019	Al-Kifl	0–0 (W–L p)	Jisr Diyala	Al-Kifl
12:30 GMT				Stadium: Al Kifl Stadium

12 September 2019	Bismaya	3–2	Al-Hamza	Bismaya
12:30 GMT				Stadium: Mashrou Al-Wahda Stadium

12 September 2019	Al-Sufiya	2–0	Jalawla	Ramadi
12:30 GMT				Stadium: Al-Ramadi Stadium

12 September 2019	Al-Sihha wal-Bi'a	0–2	Al-Hakim	Baghdad
12:30 GMT				Stadium: Al-Umal Stadium

12 September 2019	Al-Mosul	2–1	Al-Shabab	Mosul
12:30 GMT				Stadium: Al-Dawasa Stadium

12 September 2019	Tuz	0–0 (W–L p)	Al-Hawija	Tuz Khurmatu
12:30 GMT				Stadium: Al-Tuz Stadium

12 September 2019	Junoob Baghdad	1–2	Al-Noor	Baghdad
12:30 GMT				Stadium: Montada Al-Ghazaliya Stadium

12 September 2019	Bani Saad	1–0	Al-Kufa	Baghdad
12:30 GMT				Stadium: Al-Waziriya Stadium

12 September 2019	Al-Tijara	0–3	Al-Muroor	Baghdad
12:30 GMT				Stadium: Madrasa Al-Salam Stadium

12 September 2019	Suq Al-Shuyukh	0–1	Al-Hurr	Suq Al-Shuyukh
12:30 GMT			Adnan	Stadium: Suq Al-Shuyukh Stadium

12 September 2019	Baladiyat Al-Nasiriya	1–1 (8–7 p)	Al-Amir	Al-Shatra
12:30 GMT				Stadium: Al Shatrah Stadium

13 September 2019	Shabab Al-Iraq	0–1	Baladiyat Al-Basra	Baghdad
12:30 GMT				Stadium: Montada Al-Ghazaliya Stadium

13 September 2019	Baquba	1–0	Medinat Al-Shuhadaa	Hibhib
12:30 GMT				Stadium: Hibhib Stadium

13 September 2019	Babil	6–1	Al-Rawdhatain	Al-Kifl
12:30 GMT				Stadium: Al Kifl Stadium

== Second round ==
17 September 2019	Al-Sadeq	5–2	Al-Taji	Basra
12:30 GMT				Stadium: Al-Sadeq Stadium

17 September 2019	Al-Najma	1–0	Al-Alam	Diwaniya
12:30 GMT				Stadium: Al-Najma Stadium

17 September 2019	Al-Maqal	1–1 (W–L p)	Baladiyat Al-Basra	Basra
12:30 GMT				Stadium: Al Fayhaa Stadium

17 September 2019	Babil	2–0	Baquba	Al-Kifl
12:30 GMT				Stadium: Al Kifl Stadium

17 September 2019	Taza	0–1	Balad	Kirkuk
12:30 GMT				Stadium: Naft Al-Shamal Stadium

17 September 2019	Al-Mahmoudiya	0–0 (5–6 p)	Diyala	Mahmoudiya
12:30 GMT				Stadium: Al-Mahmoudiya Stadium

17 September 2019	Al-Kadhimiya	2–2 (6–7 p)	Al-Kifl	Baghdad
12:30 GMT				Stadium: Al-Kadhimiya Stadium

17 September 2019	Al-Sufiya	1–0	Bismaya	Ramadi
12:30 GMT				Stadium: Al-Ramadi Stadium

17 September 2019	Tuz	0–0 (4–3 p)	Al-Noor	Tuz Khurmatu
12:30 GMT				Stadium: Al-Tuz Stadium

17 September 2019	Bani Saad	1–0	Al-Muroor	Baghdad
12:30 GMT				Stadium: Al-Waziriya Stadium

17 September 2019	Al-Hurr	3–1	Baladiyat Al-Nasiriya	Karbala
12:30 GMT				Stadium: Al-Hurr Stadium

20 September 2019	Al-Hakim	1–1 (3–5 p)	Al-Mosul	Samawa
12:30 GMT				Stadium: Al-Muthanna Stadium

== Final phase ==
=== Bracket ===
Round of 32; 9 October 2019
Al-Quwa Al-Jawiya	1
Al-Sadeq	0
Amanat Baghdad	1 (4)
Al-Sinaat Al-Kahrabaiya (p)	1 (5)
Al-Hurr	1
Al-Diwaniya	2
Al-Samawa (p)	0 (7)
Al-Minaa	0 (6)
Al-Maqal	0
Al-Kahrabaa	2
Al-Sufiya	0
Diyala	1
Al-Najaf	1
Al-Naft	3
Tuz	2
Erbil	3
Naft Maysan	3
Al-Najma	0
Balad	2 (2)
Al-Kifl (p)	2 (3)
Zakho (w/o)	3
Al-Hudood	0
Al-Zawraa (w/o)	3
Al-Mosul	0
Al-Karkh	0
Naft Al-Wasat	2
Al-Talaba
Naft Al-Junoob
Al-Qasim (p)	0 (5)
Babil	0 (3)
Bani Saad	0
Al-Shorta	6

Round of 16
Al-Quwa Al-Jawiya
Al-Sinaat Al-Kahrabaiya
Al-Diwaniya
Al-Samawa
Al-Kahrabaa
Diyala
Al-Naft
Erbil
Naft Maysan
Al-Kifl
Zakho
Al-Zawraa
Naft Al-Wasat
Al-Qasim
Al-Shorta

Quarter-finals

Semi-finals

Final

== Round of 32 ==
20 top-tier teams and 12 lower-tier teams were set to compete in this round.

9 October 2019	Al-Quwa Al-Jawiya	1–0	Al-Sadeq	Baghdad
13:00 GMT				Stadium: Al-Quwa Al-Jawiya Stadium

9 October 2019	Amanat Baghdad	1–1 (4–5 p)	Al-Sinaat Al-Kahrabaiya	Baghdad
13:00 GMT				Stadium: Amanat Baghdad Stadium

9 October 2019	Al-Hurr	1–2	Al-Diwaniya	Karbala
13:00 GMT				Stadium: Al-Hurr Stadium

9 October 2019	Al-Samawa	0–0 (7–6 p)	Al-Minaa	Samawa
13:00 GMT				Stadium: Al-Samawa Stadium

9 October 2019	Al-Maqal	0–2	Al-Kahrabaa	Basra
13:00 GMT				Stadium: Al Fayhaa Stadium

9 October 2019	Al-Sufiya	0–1	Diyala	Ramadi
13:00 GMT				Stadium: Al-Ramadi Stadium

9 October 2019	Al-Najaf	1–3	Al-Naft	Najaf
13:00 GMT				Stadium: Al-Najaf Stadium

9 October 2019	Tuz	2–3	Erbil	Tuz Khurmatu
13:00 GMT				Stadium: Al-Tuz Stadium

9 October 2019	Naft Maysan	3–0	Al-Najma	Amara
13:00 GMT				Stadium: Maysan Stadium

9 October 2019	Balad	2–2 (2–3 p)	Al-Kifl	Balad
13:00 GMT				Stadium: Balad Stadium

9 October 2019	Zakho	3–0 (w/o)	Al-Hudood	Zakho
13:00 GMT

9 October 2019	Al-Zawraa	3–0 (w/o)	Al-Mosul	Baghdad
13:00 GMT

9 October 2019	Al-Karkh	0–2	Naft Al-Wasat	Baghdad
13:00 GMT				Stadium: Al-Karkh Stadium

9 October 2019	Al-Talaba	Postponed	Naft Al-Junoob	Baghdad
13:00 GMT

9 October 2019	Al-Qasim	0–0 (5–3 p)	Babil	Al-Kifl
13:00 GMT				Stadium: Al Kifl Stadium

9 October 2019	Bani Saad	0–6	Al-Shorta	Baghdad
13:00 GMT			Yousif 6'; Hussein 22', 45+1' (pen.), 77'; Waleed 32'; Mapuku 61' (pen.)	Stadium: Al-Shaab Stadium
