= 2018–19 Iraq FA Cup =

Tournament details
- Country: Iraq
- Dates: 12 September 2018 – 26 July 2019
- Teams: 45

Final positions
- Champions: Al-Zawraa (16th title)
- Runners-up: Al-Kahrabaa

Tournament statistics
- Matches played: 71
- Goals scored: 176 (2.48 per match)
- Top goal scorer(s): Alaa Abbas (5 goals)

The 2018–19 Iraq FA Cup was the 29th edition of the Iraqi knockout football cup as a club competition, the main domestic cup in Iraqi football. A total of 20 teams from the Iraqi Premier League and 25 teams from the Iraqi First Division League and Iraqi Second Division League participated. It started on 12 September 2018 and the final was played on 26 July 2019 at the Al-Shaab Stadium in Baghdad.

The winners of the competition were Al-Zawraa, who extended their record number of cup wins to 16 with a 1–0 victory over Al-Kahrabaa, thanks to a late goal by Safaa Hadi.

== Format ==
=== Participation ===
The cup starts with the first round, consisting of 24 teams from the Iraqi First Division League and Iraqi Second Division League. 1 team is automatically placed in the playoff round, where they face one of the first round's winners for a place in the Round of 32. The 20 Iraqi Premier League clubs join the 12 qualified teams to form the Round of 32.

=== Cards ===
If a player receives a second yellow card, they will be banned from the next cup match. If a player receives a red card, they will be banned a minimum of one match, but more can be added by the Iraq Football Association.

== Participating clubs ==
The following 45 teams participated in the competition:

**Iraqi Premier League**; 20 clubs from the 2018–19 season	**Iraqi First Division League / Iraqi Second Division League**; 25 clubs from the 2018–19 season
**Al-Zawraa**; Al-Kahrabaa; Al-Quwa Al-Jawiya; Al-Talaba; Al-Hudood; Al-Naft; Amanat Baghdad; Naft Maysan; Al-Diwaniya; Al-Karkh; Al-Najaf; Al-Samawa; Al-Shorta; Erbil; Naft Al-Junoob; Naft Al-Wasat; Al-Bahri; Al-Hussein; Al-Minaa; Al-Sinaat Al-Kahrabaiya	Al-Hindiya; Al-Husseiniya; Al-Jinsiya; Al-Khutoot; Al-Kifl; Al-Kufa; Al-Muthanna; Al-Taji; Balad; Haifa; Qalat Saleh; Samarra; Al-Mohandessin; Al-Atheer; Al-Hilla; Al-Mahmoudiya; Al-Mashroua; Al-Najma; Al-Sadeq; Badr Al-Iraq; Baladiyat Al-Nasiriya; Biladi; Brayati; Ghaz Al-Shamal; Masafi Al-Wasat

- **Bold** indicates the team is still in the competition.

== Schedule ==
The rounds of the 2018–19 competition are scheduled as follows:

Round	Draw date	Match dates	
First round	28 August 2018	12 September 2018	
Playoff round	28 August 2018	5 October 2018	
Round of 32	8 October 2018	12–25 October 2018	15–17 November 2018
Round of 16	8 October 2018	5 January 2019	10–11 January 2019
Quarter-finals	8 October 2018	21 January 2019	7 June 2019
Semi-finals	8 October 2018	11 June 2019	
Final	8 October 2018	26 July 2019	

== First round ==
24 teams from the First Division League and Second Division League competed in this round, and 1 team Al-Mohandessin was automatically placed into the playoff round.

12 September 2018	**Samarra**	**3–1**	Al-Mahmoudiya	Samarra
				Stadium: Samarra Stadium

12 September 2018	**Qalat Saleh**	**2–0**	Baladiyat Al-Nasiriya	Amara
				Stadium: Al-Maimouna Stadium; Referee: Fadhel Dakhil

12 September 2018	**Al-Jinsiya**	**3–0**	Biladi	Baghdad
				Stadium: Olympic Champion Stadium

12 September 2018	Al-Sadeq	**0–0** **(4–5 p)**	**Al-Hindiya**	Basra
				Stadium: Al-Sadeq Stadium

12 September 2018	**Balad**	**3–2**	Al-Mashroua	Balad
	Mahid; Awda 35', 42'		13'; 47'	Stadium: Balad Stadium

12 September 2018	**Al-Muthanna**	**5–1**	Badr Al-Iraq	Samawa
				Stadium: Al-Muthanna Stadium

12 September 2018	Al-Najma	**0–4**	**Al-Khutoot**	Diwaniya
				Stadium: Al-Najma Stadium

12 September 2018	Masafi Al-Wasat	**0–1**	**Al-Kufa**	Baghdad
				Stadium: Masafi Al-Wasat Stadium

12 September 2018	Al-Atheer	**0–1**	**Al-Taji**	Baghdad
				Stadium: Amanat Baghdad Stadium

12 September 2018	**Haifa**	**3–2**	Brayati	Baghdad
				Stadium: Haifa Stadium

12 September 2018	Al-Hilla	**0–1**	**Al-Husseiniya**	Babil
				Stadium: Babil Stadium; Referee: Ammar Mousa

12 September 2018	Ghaz Al-Shamal	**2–2** **(2–4 p)**	**Al-Kifl**	Kirkuk
				Stadium: Ghaz Al-Shamal Stadium

== Playoff round ==
5 October 2018	Al-Mohandessin	**1–2**	**Al-Kifl**	Baghdad
12:00 GMT				Stadium: Al-Jaish Stadium

== Final phase ==
=== Bracket ===
**Round of 32**; 12–25 October 2018; 15–17 November 2018
**Naft Al-Junoob**	5	1	**6**
Samarra	1	0	1
**Naft Maysan (p)**	0	1	1
Al-Hussein	1	0	1
**Al-Karkh**	3	2	**5**
Al-Husseiniya	0	0	0
**Al-Talaba**	5	7	**12**
Al-Kifl	2	2	4
**Al-Kahrabaa**	3	1	**4**
Al-Hindiya	1	0	1
**Al-Shorta**	5	1	**6**
Haifa	0	1	1
**Al-Diwaniya**	1	1	**2**
Al-Sinaat Al-Kahrabaiya	0	1	1
**Al-Hudood**	1	1	**2**
Al-Taji	0	0	0
**Al-Samawa**	2	1	**3**
Al-Bahri	1	1	2
**Al-Naft**	0	3	**3**
Al-Jinsiya	0	0	0
**Al-Quwa Al-Jawiya**	3	2	**5**
Balad	0	0	0
**Al-Najaf**	1	1	**2**
Al-Khutoot	0	0	0
**Naft Al-Wasat**	2	1	**3**
Al-Muthanna	0	1	1
**Amanat Baghdad**	3	3	**6**
Al-Minaa	2	1	3
**Al-Zawraa**	6	2	**8**
Al-Kufa	0	0	0
**Erbil (w/o)**	4	3	**7**
Qalat Saleh	1	0	1

**Round of 16**; 5 January 2019; 10–11 January 2019
Naft Al-Junoob	1	0	1
**Naft Maysan (p)**	0	1	1
Al-Karkh	2	0	2
**Al-Talaba**	2	1	**3**
**Al-Kahrabaa**	1	1	**2**
Al-Shorta	0	1	1
Al-Diwaniya	1	0	1
**Al-Hudood (a)**	1	0	1
Al-Samawa	0	0	0
**Al-Naft**	2	4	**6**
**Al-Quwa Al-Jawiya (w/o)**	3	3	**6**
Al-Najaf	0	0	0
Naft Al-Wasat	0	0	0
**Amanat Baghdad (p)**	0	0	0
**Al-Zawraa**	0	2	**2**
Erbil	0	1	1

**Quarter-finals**; 21 January 2019; 7 June 2019
Naft Maysan	1	0	1
**Al-Talaba (a)**	1	0	1
**Al-Kahrabaa (p)**	1	1	2
Al-Hudood	1	1	2
Al-Naft	0	0	0
**Al-Quwa Al-Jawiya**	0	2	**2**
Amanat Baghdad	0	0	0
**Al-Zawraa**	1	2	**3**

**Semi-finals**; 11 June 2019
Al-Talaba	0
**Al-Kahrabaa**	**3**
Al-Quwa Al-Jawiya	1
**Al-Zawraa**	**4**

**Final**; 26 July 2019
Al-Kahrabaa	0
**Al-Zawraa**	**1**

== Round of 32 ==
20 top-tier teams and 12 lower-tier teams competed in this round.

Team 1	Agg.	Team 2	1st leg	2nd leg
**Al-Talaba** (1)	12–4	Al-Kifl (2)	5–2	7–2
**Al-Karkh** (1)	5–0	Al-Husseiniya (2)	3–0	2–0
**Naft Al-Junoob** (1)	6–1	Samarra (2)	5–1	1–0
**Naft Maysan** (1)	1–1 (4–2 p)	Al-Hussein (1)	0–1	1–0
**Al-Diwaniya** (1)	2–1	Al-Sinaat Al-Kahrabaiya (1)	1–0	1–1
**Al-Hudood** (1)	2–0	Al-Taji (2)	1–0	1–0
**Al-Kahrabaa** (1)	4–1	Al-Hindiya (2)	3–1	1–0
**Al-Shorta** (1)	6–1	Haifa (2)	5–0	1–1
**Al-Quwa Al-Jawiya** (1)	5–0	Balad (2)	3–0	2–0
**Al-Najaf** (1)	2–0	Al-Khutoot (2)	1–0	1–0
**Al-Naft** (1)	3–0	Al-Jinsiya (2)	0–0	3–0
**Al-Samawa** (1)	3–2	Al-Bahri (1)	2–1	1–1
**Amanat Baghdad** (1)	6–3	Al-Minaa (1)	3–2	3–1
**Naft Al-Wasat** (1)	3–1	Al-Muthanna (2)	2–0	1–1
**Erbil** (1)	7–1	Qalat Saleh (2)	4–1	3–0 (w/o)
**Al-Zawraa** (1)	8–0	Al-Kufa (2)	6–0	2–0

=== First leg ===
12 October 2018	**Al-Karkh**	**3–0**	**Al-Husseiniya**	Baghdad
12:00 GMT	Zeiad; Jabbar (pen.); Abbas			Stadium: Al-Karkh Stadium; Referee: Ahmed Gomaa

12 October 2018	**Al-Diwaniya**	**1–0**	**Al-Sinaat Al-Kahrabaiya**	Diwaniya
12:00 GMT	Adnan			Stadium: Al-Diwaniya Stadium; Referee: Fareed Kareem

12 October 2018	**Al-Hudood**	**1–0**	**Al-Taji**	Baghdad
12:00 GMT	Abdul-Kadhim 30'			Stadium: Al-Taji Stadium; Referee: Mohammed Ryad

12 October 2018	**Al-Kahrabaa**	**3–1**	**Al-Hindiya**	Baghdad
12:00 GMT	Muhsen 3'; Raad 8'; Koné 88'		75'	Stadium: Al-Kahrabaa Stadium; Referee: Montaser Ghazi

12 October 2018	**Al-Quwa Al-Jawiya**	**3–0**	**Balad**	Baghdad
12:00 GMT	Radhi 70'; Mendy 77'; Ahmed 82'			Stadium: Al-Quwa Al-Jawiya Stadium; Referee: Rawad Yassin

12 October 2018	**Al-Samawa**	**2–1**	**Al-Bahri**	Samawa
12:00 GMT	Younis 5', 14'		Terry 47'	Stadium: Al-Samawa Stadium; Referee: Hamid Talib

12 October 2018	**Amanat Baghdad**	**3–2**	**Al-Minaa**	Baghdad
12:00 GMT	Salim 6'; Ibrahim 49'; Qasem 53'		Jasem 19'; Jabbar 90'	Stadium: Amanat Baghdad Stadium; Referee: Ayad Mozahem

12 October 2018	**Naft Al-Wasat**	**2–0**	**Al-Muthanna**	Najaf
12:00 GMT				Stadium: Al-Najaf Stadium; Referee: Amjad Subhi

12 October 2018	**Erbil**	**4–1**	**Qalat Saleh**	Erbil
14:00 GMT	Amaral 20', 83'; Salman 55', 77'			Stadium: Franso Hariri Stadium; Referee: Ahmed Askar

13 October 2018	**Al-Talaba**	**5–2**	**Al-Kifl**	Baghdad
12:00 GMT	Tariq 2' (pen.), 38'; H. Hussein 18'; M. Hussein 55', 60'			Stadium: Al-Karkh Stadium; Referee: Diaa Jendil

13 October 2018	**Naft Al-Junoob**	**5–1**	**Samarra**	Basra
12:00 GMT				Stadium: Al Fayhaa Stadium; Referee: Ahmed Majid

13 October 2018	**Naft Maysan**	**0–1**	**Al-Hussein**	Maysan
12:00 GMT			Mohammed 74'	Stadium: Maysan Stadium; Referee: Tahseen Ali

13 October 2018	**Al-Najaf**	**1–0**	**Al-Khutoot**	Najaf
12:00 GMT	Rzaiej 60'			Stadium: Al-Najaf International Stadium; Referee: Saif Khamis

13 October 2018	**Al-Naft**	**0–0**	**Al-Jinsiya**	Baghdad
12:00 GMT				Stadium: Al-Naft Stadium; Referee: Yasser Hashem

13 October 2018	**Al-Zawraa**	**6–0**	**Al-Kufa**	Baghdad
12:00 GMT	Abbas 20' (pen.), 30', 55', 71'; Hussein 70'; Ahmed 90+1'			Stadium: Amanat Baghdad Stadium; Referee: Mohammed Sadeq

25 October 2018	**Al-Shorta**	**5–0**	**Haifa**	Baghdad
11:30 GMT	Diallo 7', 53' (pen.), 64' (pen.); Mohammed 9'; Ali 82'			Stadium: Amanat Baghdad Stadium

=== Second leg ===
15 November 2018	Al-Sinaat Al-Kahrabaiya	**1–1** (**1–2** agg.)	**Al-Diwaniya**	Baghdad
10:00 GMT	Saad 79' (pen.)		Mehdi 80'	Stadium: Al-Taji Stadium; Referee: Montaser Ghazi

15 November 2018	Al-Hindiya	**0–1** (**1–4** agg.)	**Al-Kahrabaa**	Baghdad
10:00 GMT			Hadeeb 90+2'	Referee: Mohammed Sadeq

16 November 2018	Al-Kifl	**2–7** (**4–12** agg.)	**Al-Talaba**	Al-Kifl
10:00 GMT	30'; 87'		Sabah 10'; Zamel 25', 55', 90'; Tariq 35'; Jawda 40'; Saad 85'	Referee: Zaid Fadel

16 November 2018	Al-Husseiniya	**0–2** (**0–5** agg.)	**Al-Karkh**	Baghdad
10:00 GMT				Stadium: Al-Karkh Stadium; Referee: Hamid Talib

16 November 2018	Al-Hussein	**0–1** (**1–1** agg.) (**2–4** p)	**Naft Maysan**	Baghdad
10:00 GMT			Zamel 88'	Stadium: Al-Naft Stadium; Referee: Mohamed Salman

16 November 2018	Haifa	**1–1** (**1–6** agg.)	**Al-Shorta**	Baghdad
10:00 GMT	Mundher 66'		Diallo 44'	Stadium: Al-Sinaa Stadium; Referee: Shamil Tahseen

16 November 2018	Al-Khutoot	**0–1** (**0–2** agg.)	**Al-Najaf**	Baghdad
10:00 GMT				Stadium: Al-Taji Stadium; Referee: Salam Juma

16 November 2018	Al-Bahri	**1–1** (**2–3** agg.)	**Al-Samawa**	Basra
10:00 GMT			Younis	Stadium: Al-Zubair Stadium; Referee: Amjad Subhi

16 November 2018	Al-Minaa	**1–3** (**3–6** agg.)	**Amanat Baghdad**	Basra
10:00 GMT	Junuzović 81' (pen.)		Qasem 14'; Mohammed 77'; Jabbar 86'	Stadium: Al Fayhaa Stadium; Referee: Fareed Kareem

16 November 2018	Al-Muthanna	**1–1** (**1–3** agg.)	**Naft Al-Wasat**	Samawa
10:00 GMT				Referee: Ali Ahmed Shaker

16 November 2018	Al-Kufa	**0–2** (**0–8** agg.)	**Al-Zawraa**	Najaf
10:00 GMT			Muhsen 30'; Karim 44' (pen.)	Stadium: Al-Najaf Stadium; Referee: Mohammed Saleh

16 November 2018	Qalat Saleh	**0–3 (w/o)** (**1–7** agg.)	**Erbil**	Amara
10:00 GMT

17 November 2018	Samarra	**0–1** (**1–6** agg.)	**Naft Al-Junoob**	Samarra
10:00 GMT			Ali 40'	Referee: Ahmed Mohamed

17 November 2018	Al-Taji	**0–1** (**0–2** agg.)	**Al-Hudood**	Baghdad
10:00 GMT			Owolabi 79', (penalty missed) 82', (red card) 88'	Stadium: Al-Taji Stadium; Referee: Diaa Jendil

17 November 2018	Balad	**0–2** (**0–5** agg.)	**Al-Quwa Al-Jawiya**	Balad
10:00 GMT			Mohammed 42'; Qasim 45'	Referee: Tana Osman

17 November 2018	Al-Jinsiya	**0–3** (**0–3** agg.)	**Al-Naft**	Baghdad
10:00 GMT				Stadium: Al-Kahrabaa Stadium; Referee: Ahmed Kazem

== Round of 16 ==
All remaining teams are from the top-tier.

Team 1	Agg.	Team 2	1st leg	2nd leg
Al-Karkh	2–3	**Al-Talaba**	2–2	0–1
Naft Al-Junoob	1–1 (1–3 p)	**Naft Maysan**	1–0	0–1
Al-Diwaniya	1–1 (a)	**Al-Hudood**	1–1	0–0
**Al-Kahrabaa**	2–1	Al-Shorta	1–0	1–1
**Al-Quwa Al-Jawiya**	6–0	Al-Najaf	3–0 (w/o)	3–0 (w/o)
Al-Samawa	0–6	**Al-Naft**	0–2	0–4
Naft Al-Wasat	0–0 (2–4 p)	**Amanat Baghdad**	0–0	0–0
**Al-Zawraa**	2–1	Erbil	0–0	2–1

=== First leg ===
5 January 2019	**Al-Quwa Al-Jawiya**	**3–0 (w/o)**	**Al-Najaf**	Baghdad
09:30 GMT				Stadium: Al-Shaab Stadium

5 January 2019	**Al-Karkh**	**2–2**	**Al-Talaba**	Baghdad
10:00 GMT	Turky 88'; Khalil 90+1' (pen.)		Muhammed (red card) 27'; Kalaf 60'; Hussein 75' (pen.)	Stadium: Al-Karkh Stadium

5 January 2019	**Naft Al-Junoob**	**1–0**	**Naft Maysan**	Basra
10:00 GMT	Zamil 76'			Stadium: Al Fayhaa Stadium

5 January 2019	**Al-Diwaniya**	**1–1**	**Al-Hudood**	Diwaniya
10:00 GMT	Kareem 25'		Iyad 5'	Stadium: Al-Diwaniya Stadium

5 January 2019	**Al-Kahrabaa**	**1–0**	**Al-Shorta**	Baghdad
10:00 GMT	Mhaisen 75'		Abdul-Zahra (penalty missed) 85'	Stadium: Al-Kahrabaa Stadium

5 January 2019	**Al-Samawa**	**0–2**	**Al-Naft**	Samawa
10:00 GMT			Mohsin 30'; Shakor 75'	Stadium: Al-Samawa Stadium

5 January 2019	**Naft Al-Wasat**	**0–0**	**Amanat Baghdad**	Najaf
10:00 GMT				Stadium: Al-Najaf Stadium

5 January 2019	**Al-Zawraa**	**0–0**	**Erbil**	Baghdad
10:00 GMT				Stadium: Amanat Baghdad Stadium

=== Second leg ===
10 January 2019	**Al-Talaba**	**1–0** (**3–2** agg.)	Al-Karkh	Baghdad
09:30 GMT	Hussein 31'			Stadium: Al-Sinaa Stadium; Referee: Wathik Mohammed Al-Baag

10 January 2019	**Naft Maysan**	**1–0** (**1–1** agg.) (**3–1** p)	Naft Al-Junoob	Amara
09:30 GMT	Naeem 41'			Stadium: Al-Maimouna Stadium; Referee: Mohammed Sadeq

10 January 2019	**Al-Hudood**	**0–0** (**1–1 (a)** agg.)	Al-Diwaniya	Baghdad
09:30 GMT				Stadium: Al-Taji Stadium

10 January 2019	Al-Najaf	**0–3 (w/o)** (**0–6** agg.)	**Al-Quwa Al-Jawiya**	Najaf
09:30 GMT				Stadium: Al-Najaf International Stadium

10 January 2019	**Al-Naft**	**4–0** (**6–0** agg.)	Al-Samawa	Baghdad
09:30 GMT	20'; Kareem 44', 70'; Mohsin 80'			Stadium: Al-Naft Stadium

10 January 2019	**Amanat Baghdad**	**0–0** (**0–0** agg.) (**4–2** p)	Naft Al-Wasat	Baghdad
09:30 GMT				Stadium: Amanat Baghdad Stadium

10 January 2019	Erbil	**1–2** (**1–2** agg.)	**Al-Zawraa**	Erbil
09:30 GMT	Khesro 5'		Jalal 25'; Fadhel 60'	Stadium: Franso Hariri Stadium

11 January 2019	Al-Shorta	**1–1** (**1–2** agg.)	**Al-Kahrabaa**	Baghdad
10:00 GMT	Abdul-Zahra 31'		Raad 59'	Stadium: Amanat Baghdad Stadium; Referee: Mohamed Salman

== Quarter-finals ==
Team 1	Agg.	Team 2	1st leg	2nd leg
Naft Maysan	1–1 (a)	**Al-Talaba**	1–1	0–0
**Al-Kahrabaa**	2–2 (4–3 p)	Al-Hudood	1–1	1–1
Al-Naft	0–2	**Al-Quwa Al-Jawiya**	0–0	0–2
Amanat Baghdad	0–3	**Al-Zawraa**	0–1	0–2

=== First leg ===
21 January 2019	**Naft Maysan**	**1–1**	**Al-Talaba**	Amara
10:30 GMT	Saadoun 67'		Tariq 60'	Stadium: Al-Maimouna Stadium; Referee: Mohamed Salman

21 January 2019	**Al-Kahrabaa**	**1–1**	**Al-Hudood**	Baghdad
10:30 GMT	Mhaisen (penalty missed) 15', 26'		Jassim 24'	Stadium: Al-Kahrabaa Stadium; Referee: Mustafa Abdul-Karim

21 January 2019	**Al-Naft**	**0–0**	**Al-Quwa Al-Jawiya**	Baghdad
10:30 GMT				Stadium: Al-Sinaa Stadium; Referee: Wathik Mohammed Al-Baag

21 January 2019	**Amanat Baghdad**	**0–1**	**Al-Zawraa**	Baghdad
10:30 GMT			Abdul-Raheem 57'	Stadium: Amanat Baghdad Stadium; Referee: Mohamed Tarek

=== Second leg ===
7 June 2019	**Al-Talaba**	**0–0** (**1–1 (a)** agg.)	Naft Maysan	Baghdad
13:30 GMT				Stadium: Al-Shaab Stadium; Referee: Wathik Mohammed Al-Baag

7 June 2019	Al-Hudood	**1–1** (**2–2** agg.) (**3–4** p)	**Al-Kahrabaa**	Baghdad
13:30 GMT	Abbas 90+1'		Mohammed 84'	Stadium: Al-Taji Stadium

7 June 2019	**Al-Quwa Al-Jawiya**	**2–0** (**2–0** agg.)	Al-Naft	Baghdad
13:30 GMT	Abdul-Zahra 40' (o.g.); Ahmed 75'			Stadium: Al-Quwa Al-Jawiya Stadium

7 June 2019	**Al-Zawraa**	**2–0** (**3–0** agg.)	Amanat Baghdad	Baghdad
17:00 GMT	Jalal 61'; Sabah 85'			Stadium: Al-Shaab Stadium

== Semi-finals ==
11 June 2019	Al-Talaba	**0–3**	**Al-Kahrabaa**	Baghdad
13:45 GMT			Mhaisen 7'; Assan 49'; Ibrahim 67'	Stadium: Al-Sinaa Stadium; Referee: Ali Sabah

11 June 2019	Al-Quwa Al-Jawiya	**1–4**	**Al-Zawraa**	Baghdad
16:00 GMT	Mohammed 79' (o.g.)		Abdul-Raheem 5'; Qasim 17'; Abbas 35'; Sabah 85'	Stadium: Al-Shaab Stadium; Referee: Wathik Mohammed Al-Baag

== Final ==
26 July 2019	Al-Kahrabaa	**0–1**	**Al-Zawraa**	Baghdad
16:00 GMT			Hadi 86'	Stadium: Al-Shaab Stadium; Referee: Wathik Mohammed Al-Baag

Iraq FA Cup
2018–19 winner
**Al-Zawraa**
**16th title**
