= Isiaka =

Isiaka is both a given name and a surname. Notable people with the name include:

- Isiaka Adeleke (1955–2017), Nigerian politician
- Isiaka Oladayo Amao (born 1965), Nigerian air marshal
- Isiaka Olawale (born 1983), Nigerian footballer
- Raheem Owolabi Isiaka (born 1991), Nigerian footballer
