= Karrar Nabeel =

Iraqi footballer

Personal information
- Date of birth: 16 January 1998 (age 28)
- Position: Midfielder

Team information
- Current team: Al-Zawraa

Senior career*
| Years | Team | Apps | (Gls) |
| –2018 | Al-Najaf | | |
| 2018–2023 | Al-Quwa Al-Jawiya | | |
| 2023–2024 | Al-Talaba | | |
| 2024– | Al-Zawraa | | |

International career
| 2019– | Iraq | 1 | (0) |
- * Club domestic league appearances and goals

Karrar Nabeel Hussein Al-Janat (Arabic: كَرَّار نَبِيل حُسَيْن الْجَنَّات; born 16 January 1998) is an Iraqi footballer who plays as a midfielder for Al-Zawraa in the Iraq Stars League and the Iraq national team.

== International career ==
On 26 March 2019, Nabeel made his first international cap with Iraq against Jordan in the 2019 International Friendship Championship.

=== International goals ===
As of match played 26 September 2026

Scores and results list Iraq's goal tally first.

International goals by date, venue, cap, opponent, score, result and competition
| No. | Date | Venue | Opponent | Score | Result | Competition |
|---|---|---|---|---|---|---|
| 1 | 26 September 2026 | Prince Abdullah Al-Faisal Sports City Stadium, Jeddah, Saudi Arabia | Kuwait | 3–2 | 3–2 | 27th Arabian Gulf Cup |

== Honours ==
=== Club ===
Al-Quwa Al-Jawiya

- Iraqi Premier League: 2020–21
- Iraq FA Cup: 2020–21, 2022–23
- AFC Cup: 2018
