= Al Nasr SC =

Nasr (Arabic: نصر) means victory in Arabic. Accordingly, many Arab sports clubs are called Nasr or Al Nasr.

Nasr SC or Al Nasr SC (as well as Nasr FC or Al Nasr FC) may refer to:

== Men Teams ==
- Al-Nassr FC, Saudi Arabian football club based in Riyadh
- Al-Nasr SC (Bahrain), Bahraini sports club
- Al-Nasr SC (Benghazi), Libyan football club based in Benghazi
- Al Nasr SC (Egypt), Egyptian football club based in Cairo
- Al-Nasr SC (Dubai), UAE football club based in Dubai
- Al-Nasr SC (Iraq), Iraqi sports club based in Dhi Qar
- Al-Nasr SC (Kuwait), Kuwaiti sports club based in Ardiya
- Al-Nasr SC (Salalah), Omani sports club based in Salalah
- Al-Nasr wal-Salam SC, Iraqi sports club based in Baghdad
- NA Hussein Dey, also known as Nasr Athlétique de Hussein Dey, an Algerian sports club based in Hussein Dey
- ASC Nasr de Sebkha, Mauritanean football club based in Sebkha

== Women Teams ==
- Al-Nasser SC (women), Jordanian women's football team in Amman

== See also ==
- Nasr (disambiguation)
