= Ahmed Jalal =

Ahmed Jalal may refer to:

- Ahmed Jalal (footballer), Iraqi footballer
- Ahmed Jalal (handballer), Bahraini handball player
