= Al Bdeir SC =

Iraqi football club

- Full name: Al Bdeir Sport Club
- Founded: 1992; 33 years ago
- Ground: Al Bdeir Stadium
- Chairman: Ahmed Sabeeh Murad
- Manager: Hassan Faleh Al-Abedi
- League: Iraqi Third Division League
| Home colours | Away colours |

Al Bdeir Sport Club (Arabic: نادي آل بدير الرياضي), is an Iraqi football team based in Al-Qādisiyyah, that plays in Iraqi Third Division League.

== Managerial history ==
- (Iraq) Ahmed Jomaa
- (Iraq) Rahim Zoghaiyer
- (Iraq) Abdul-Zahra Odeh
- (Iraq) Tariq Tuaima
- (Iraq) Hassan Faleh Al-Abedi

== See also ==
- 2021–22 Iraqi Second Division League
