= Jabla SC =

Iraqi football club

- Full name: Jabla Sport Club
- Founded: 2019; 6 years ago
- Ground: Jabla Stadium
- Chairman: Ahmed Aziz Al-Sultani
- Manager: Hamed Eissa Muhaimed
- League: Iraqi Third Division League
Home colours	Away colours

Jabla Sport Club (Arabic: نادي جبلة الرياضي), is an Iraqi football team based in Babil, that plays in the Iraqi Third Division League.

== Managerial history ==
- (Iraq) Mohammed Sohail Chaychan
- (Iraq) Najem Abdullah
- (Iraq) Hamed Eissa Muhaimed

== See also ==
- 2020–21 Iraq FA Cup
- 2021–22 Iraq FA Cup
