= Al-Sukar SC =

Iraqi football club

- Full name: Al-Sukar Sport Club
- Founded: 2005; 20 years ago
- Ground: Al-Sukar Stadium
- Chairman: Jalal Fahad Hussein
- Manager: Emad Hamid
- League: Iraqi Third Division League
Home colours	Away colours

Al-Sukar Sport Club (Arabic: نادي السكر الرياضي), is an Iraqi football team based in Al-Mejar Al-Kabir District, Maysan, that plays in the Iraqi Third Division League.

== Managerial history ==
- (Iraq) Emad Hamid

== See also ==
- 2021–22 Iraqi Second Division League
