= Al-Rawdhatain SC =

Iraqi football club

- Full name: Al-Rawdhatain Sport Club
- Founded: 2001; 25 years ago
- Ground: Al-Rawdhatain Stadium
- Chairman: Bassim Jaber Hussein
- Manager: Alaa Mohammed Salih
- League: Iraqi Third Division League
Home colours	Away colours

Al-Rawdhatain Sport Club (Arabic: نادي الروضتين الرياضي), is an Iraqi football team based in Karbala, that plays in the Iraqi Third Division League.

== Managerial history ==
- (Iraq) Salem Odah
- (Iraq) Alaa Mohammed Salih

== See also ==
- 2019–20 Iraq FA Cup
