= 2020–21 Iraqi Premier League =

Iraqi Premier League
- Season: 2020–21
- Dates: 25 October 2020 – 28 July 2021
- Champions: Al-Quwa Al-Jawiya (7th title)
- Relegated: Al-Sinaat Al-Kahrabaiya; Al-Hudood; Al-Samawa
- AFC Champions League: Al-Quwa Al-Jawiya; Al-Zawraa
- Matches: 380
- Goals: 773 (2.03 per match)
- Top goalscorer: Aymen Hussein (22 goals)
- Biggest home win: Al-Shorta 7–0 Al-Samawa (2 April 2021)
- Biggest away win: Naft Maysan 0–4 Al-Quwa Al-Jawiya (16 May 2021)
- Highest scoring: Al-Shorta 7–0 Al-Samawa (2 April 2021); Al-Quwa Al-Jawiya 3–4 Al-Najaf (12 May 2021)
- Longest winning run: 6 matches Al-Quwa Al-Jawiya
- Longest unbeaten run: 15 matches Al-Quwa Al-Jawiya
- Longest winless run: 20 matches Al-Hudood
- Longest losing run: 6 matches Al-Talaba

The 2020–21 Iraqi Premier League was the 47th season of the Iraqi Premier League since its establishment in 1974. The season started on 25 October 2020 and ended on 28 July 2021, with the relegation play-off held on 30 July 2021.

Al-Quwa Al-Jawiya sealed their seventh Premier League title with three matches to spare, finishing ahead of Al-Zawraa and Al-Najaf. Al-Quwa Al-Jawiya also won the Iraq FA Cup to become the first Iraqi club since the 2001–02 season to win the double. Their manager Ayoub Odisho became the most successful coach in Premier League history with four titles.

== New rules ==
For the first time in the Iraqi Premier League, the Iraq Football Association decided to use head-to-head points as the first tiebreaker for teams level on points, followed by head-to-head goal difference, total goal difference, total number of wins and total goals scored. Also, the maximum number of substitutions in a game for each team was increased from four to five.

== Teams ==
Locations of the 2020–21 Iraqi Premier League teams

Twenty teams competed in the league – the top eighteen teams from the 2018–19 season and the two promoted teams from the 2018–19 Iraqi First Division League.

=== Clubs and locations ===
Team	Manager	Location	Stadium	Capacity
Al-Diwaniya	(Iraq) Ahmed Khalaf	Diwaniya	Al-Diwaniya Stadium	5,000
Al-Hudood	(Iraq) Abbas Attiya	Baghdad	Al-Taji Stadium	5,000
Al-Kahrabaa	(Iraq) Ahmed Salah	Baghdad	Al-Taji Stadium	5,000
Al-Karkh	(Iraq) Thair Ahmed	Baghdad	Al-Saher Ahmed Radhi Stadium	5,150
Al-Minaa	(Iraq) Ahmed Rahim	Basra	Al-Fayhaa Stadium	10,000
Al-Naft	(Iraq) Basim Qasim	Baghdad	Al-Sinaa Stadium	10,000
Al-Najaf	(Iraq) Hatif Shamran	Najaf	Al-Najaf International Stadium	30,000
Al-Qasim	(Iraq) Qusay Munir	Babil	Al-Kifl Stadium	10,000
Al-Quwa Al-Jawiya	(Iraq) Ayoub Odisho	Baghdad	Al-Shaab Stadium	34,200
Al-Samawa	(Iraq) Aqeel Ghani	Samawa	Al-Samawa Stadium	5,000
Al-Shorta	(Serbia) Aleksandar Ilić	Baghdad	Al-Shaab Stadium	34,200
Al-Sinaat Al-Kahrabaiya	(Iraq) Adel Nima	Baghdad	Al-Taji Stadium	5,000
Al-Talaba	(Iraq) Thair Jassam	Baghdad	Al-Shaab Stadium	34,200
Al-Zawraa	(Iraq) Radhi Shenaishil	Baghdad	Al-Shaab Stadium	34,200
Amanat Baghdad	(Iraq) Essam Hamad	Baghdad	Amanat Baghdad Stadium	5,000
Erbil	(Iraq) Taha Qadir	Erbil	Franso Hariri Stadium	25,000
Naft Al-Basra (Note: On 23 October 2020, Naft Al-Junoob officially changed its name to Naft Al-Basra.)	(Iraq) Emad Aoda	Basra	Al-Fayhaa Stadium	10,000
Naft Al-Wasat	(Iraq) Abdul-Ghani Shahad	Najaf	Al-Najaf International Stadium	30,000
Naft Maysan	(Iraq) Uday Ismail	Amara	Maysan Olympic Stadium	25,000
Zakho	(Iraq) Abdul-Wahab Abu Al-Hail	Zakho	Zakho International Stadium	20,000

== League table ==
Pos	Team	Pld	W	D	L	GF	GA	GD	Pts	Qualification or relegation
1	Al-Quwa Al-Jawiya (C)	38	25	8	5	68	29	+39	83	Qualification for the AFC Champions League group stage
2	Al-Zawraa	38	20	15	3	46	19	+27	75	Qualification for the AFC Champions League play-off round
3	Al-Najaf (Note: Since the winners of the 2020–21 Iraq FA Cup, Al-Quwa Al-Jawiya, also qualified for the AFC Champions League based on league position, the second AFC Champions League play-off round spot was passed to the third-placed team. However, Al-Najaf failed to obtain an AFC license. The fourth-placed team, Al-Shorta, declined to participate in place of Al-Najaf, therefore Iraq's second AFC Champions League play-off round spot was annulled.)	38	21	11	6	46	26	+20	74	
4	Al-Shorta	38	20	12	6	60	27	+33	72	
5	Naft Al-Wasat	38	16	15	7	46	31	+15	63	
6	Al-Naft	38	12	17	9	36	34	+2	53	
7	Amanat Baghdad	38	13	11	14	30	32	−2	50	
8	Al-Minaa	38	12	13	13	45	44	+1	49	
9	Zakho	38	10	16	12	35	40	−5	46	
10	Al-Karkh	38	11	12	15	35	40	−5	45	
11	Naft Al-Basra	38	10	14	14	35	45	−10	44 (Note: Naft Al-Basra finished ahead of Erbil on head-to-head points: Erbil 0–1 Naft Al-Basra, Naft Al-Basra 1–0 Erbil.)	
12	Erbil	38	10	14	14	39	41	−2	44	
13	Naft Maysan	38	9	16	13	38	48	−10	43	
14	Al-Kahrabaa	38	8	17	13	36	39	−3	41 (Note: Al-Kahrabaa finished ahead of Al-Qasim and Al-Diwaniya on head-to-head points: Al-Kahrabaa 8, Al-Qasim 3, Al-Diwaniya 3. Al-Qasim finished ahead of Al-Diwaniya on goal difference: Al-Qasim –11, Al-Diwaniya –14.)	
15	Al-Qasim	38	9	14	15	39	50	−11	41	
16	Al-Diwaniya	38	7	20	11	22	36	−14	41	
17	Al-Talaba	38	8	15	15	36	47	−11	39	
18	Al-Sinaat Al-Kahrabaiya (R)	38	7	16	15	27	39	−12	37	Qualification for the relegation play-off
19	Al-Hudood (R)	38	4	19	15	32	48	−16	31	Relegation to the Iraqi First Division League
20	Al-Samawa (R)	38	5	11	22	22	58	−36	26	Relegation to the Iraqi First Division League

Source: IPFL
Rules for classification: 1) points; 2) head-to-head points; 3) head-to-head goal difference; 4) goal difference; 5) number of wins; 6) number of goals scored.
(C) Champions; (R) Relegated

== Results ==
Home \ Away	DIW	HUD	KAH	KAR	MIN	NFT	NJF	QSM	QWJ	SMA	SHR	SNK	TLB	ZWR	AMN	ERB	NFB	NFW	NFM	ZAK
Al-Diwaniya		1–1	0–0	0–2	1–0	1–0	1–0	1–1	0–0	1–0	2–0	2–2	1–1	0–1	0–1	0–0	0–0	0–0	1–1	0–0
Al-Hudood	1–1		1–1	0–0	1–1	0–1	2–1	2–2	1–2	0–0	0–2	1–1	2–2	1–2	0–2	0–1	1–1	1–2	2–2	1–2
Al-Kahrabaa	3–0	2–2		1–0	2–2	0–1	0–0	1–0	0–1	1–0	0–3	1–1	0–1	0–0	0–1	2–2	1–1	0–1	1–0	1–2
Al-Karkh	2–1	0–1	1–0		2–1	0–2	1–2	2–1	0–2	0–0	0–3	1–0	2–2	1–1	0–0	2–0	4–2	0–1	0–1	1–1
Al-Minaa	2–0	0–0	1–3	2–2		0–1	0–2	2–1	2–0	3–1	2–3	1–0	1–0	0–0	0–1	3–0	1–1	1–1	1–0	3–1
Al-Naft	1–1	0–0	1–1	1–1	1–1		1–0	0–0	1–4	3–3	2–2	2–0	1–0	0–0	0–1	1–1	1–1	0–1	2–3	1–0
Al-Najaf	2–0	2–1	1–1	2–2	1–0	2–0		1–0	0–0	1–0	3–1	2–1	2–0	0–1	2–1	0–0	1–1	0–3 (Note: The Al-Najaf–Naft Al-Wasat match was awarded as a 3–0 win to Naft Al-Wasat, as Al-Najaf did not turn up for the game.)	0–0	1–1
Al-Qasim	0–0	2–0	1–1	0–0	1–2	0–2	1–1		1–2	3–2	0–2	1–0	2–3	0–2	3–1	0–0	1–2	2–1	3–3	2–1
Al-Quwa Al-Jawiya	0–0	2–1	1–0	3–2	2–1	4–1	3–4	1–1		5–1	2–0	2–0	1–1	2–0	0–1	3–0	3–2	3–2	3–1	4–1
Al-Samawa	2–3	0–0	1–0	1–0	1–0	1–1	0–1	1–1	0–2		0–3	2–0	1–1	1–2	0–0	0–1	0–0	0–0	1–2	0–2
Al-Shorta	5–0	1–2	0–0	1–0	4–2	1–1	0–0	1–0	0–0	7–0		1–1	2–0	1–1	2–0	2–1	1–0	1–1	3–1	2–1
Al-Sinaat Al-Kahrabaiya	1–1	0–0	1–0	3–2	0–0	0–0	0–1	1–1	2–1	0–0	1–1		0–3	0–1	0–0	2–0	1–0	1–1	0–0	1–0
Al-Talaba	1–0	1–1	3–1	1–2	4–2	0–0	0–2	1–0	0–1	1–2	0–1	1–2		0–2	1–2	1–1	0–0	2–2	1–1	1–1
Al-Zawraa	3–0	3–0	2–2	0–1	1–1	1–1	2–0	2–0	1–1	1–0	1–0	1–0	0–0		1–0	2–1	2–0	1–1	1–1	0–1
Amanat Baghdad	1–1	0–1	1–0	1–0	0–1	1–1	0–1	0–1	0–1	2–1	1–1	2–1	0–1	1–1		0–2	3–0	1–1	0–0	0–0
Erbil	1–0	1–1	1–1	0–1	2–2	2–1	1–1	5–1	0–0	2–0	0–1	1–0	5–0	1–3	2–2		0–1	0–1	0–1	1–1
Naft Al-Basra	0–1	3–2	2–2	1–0	1–2	0–1	0–3	1–1	1–2	2–1	0–1	0–0	1–1	0–0	1–0	1–0		2–3	2–1	1–0
Naft Al-Wasat	0–0	0–0	0–0	0–0	1–1	1–0	0–1	2–3	0–1	5–1	1–0	3–2	1–0	0–2	4–1	1–0	2–1		0–1	1–1
Naft Maysan	0–0	3–2	2–4	2–1	0–0	1–2	1–2	0–1	0–4	0–0	1–1	2–2	0–0	0–1	1–0	2–3	1–1	0–1		1–1
Zakho	1–1	1–0	1–3	0–0	2–1	1–1	0–1	1–1	1–0	2–0	0–0	1–0	2–1	1–1	0–2	1–1	1–2	1–1	1–2	

Source: IPFL
Legend: Blue = home team win; Yellow = draw; Red = away team win.

== Relegation play-off ==
30 July 2021
18:00 UTC+03:00

Al-Sinaat Al-Kahrabaiya	1–1	Samarra
Mahmoud 57' (pen.)		Adnan (penalty missed) 38' Mohammed 53'
Penalties
Shaibani (penalty missed); Malik (penalty scored); Nouri (penalty scored); Mohammed (penalty missed)	2–4	(penalty scored) Saadi; (penalty scored) Al-Dahi; (penalty missed) Abdullah; (penalty scored) Abdul-Hassan; (penalty scored) Mutlaq

Al-Shaab Stadium, Baghdad
Referee: Mohanad Qasim Sarray

Samarra are promoted to the Iraqi Premier League, while Al-Sinaat Al-Kahrabaiya are relegated to the Iraqi First Division League.

== Season statistics ==
=== Top scorers ===
Rank	Player	Club	Goals
1	(Iraq) Aymen Hussein	Al-Quwa Al-Jawiya	22
2	(Iraq) Manar Taha	Al-Hudood	15
3	(Iraq) Mohammed Jaffal	Al-Talaba	14
3	(Iraq) Ahmed Lafta	Al-Najaf	14
3	(Iraq) Hammadi Ahmed	Al-Quwa Al-Jawiya	14

=== Hat-tricks ===
Player	For	Against	Result	Date
(Iraq) Mousa Adnan	Al-Naft	Al-Samawa	3–1 (H)	12 December 2020
(Iraq) Aymen Hussein	Al-Quwa Al-Jawiya	Al-Naft	4–1 (H)	31 January 2021
(Iraq) Wakaa Ramadan	Al-Talaba	Al-Minaa	4–2 (H)	4 July 2021

Notes

(H) – Home team

== Awards ==
Award	Winner	Club
Soccer Iraq Goal of the Season	(Nigeria) Joseph Nathaniel	Al-Hudood

== Match ball ==
On 23 October 2020, Umbro announced their official partnership with Iraq Football Association to manufacture the official match ball for the Iraqi Premier League. The official match ball is named Neo Toba. The design was conceived in such a way as to reflect the colours of the Iraqi flag and the patterns represent symbols of ancient Mesopotamian civilization. The term Toba is taken from the Iraqi dialect (Arabic: طوبة) which means "ball" in common parlance.

== See also ==
- 2020–21 Iraq FA Cup
