= Jisr Diyala SC =

Iraqi football club

- Full name: Jisr Diyala Sport Club
- Founded: 2003; 22 years ago
- Ground: Jisr Diyala Stadium
- Chairman: Khaled Abid-Ali Al-Rikabi
- Manager: Jalal Adnan
- League: Iraqi Third Division League
Home colours	Away colours

Jisr Diyala Sport Club (Arabic: نادي جسر ديالى الرياضي), is an Iraqi football team based in Baghdad, that plays in the Iraqi Third Division League.

== Managerial history ==
- (Iraq) Jalal Adnan

== See also ==
- 2016–17 Iraq FA Cup
- 2019–20 Iraq FA Cup
- 2020–21 Iraq FA Cup
- 2021–22 Iraq FA Cup
