= 2018–19 Iraqi First Division League =

Iraqi First Division League
- Season: 2018–19
- Champions: Al-Qasim (1st title)
- Promoted: Al-Qasim; Zakho

The 2018–19 Iraqi First Division League. Al-Qasim won the league and were promoted to the 2019–20 Iraqi Premier League along with Zakho.

== Format ==
Teams from all over Iraq participated in preliminary qualifications for the final stage, which consist of 12 teams split into two groups. The winners of the two groups were promoted.

== Elite stage ==
=== Group 1 ===
All matches played in Karbala.

Pos	Team	Pld	W	D	L	GF	GA	GD	Pts	Promotion
1	Al-Qasim (C, Q)	5	4	1	0	10	1	+9	13	Promotion to the Iraqi Premier League
2	Samaraa	5	2	2	1	4	3	+1	8	
3	Maysan	5	1	4	0	8	7	+1	7	
4	Ghaz Al-Shamal	5	1	3	1	3	4	−1	6	
5	Karbalaa	5	1	0	4	5	10	−5	3	
6	Al-Jinsiya	5	0	2	3	2	7	−5	2	

Source: Iraq Football Association
Rules for classification: 1) points; 2) goal difference; 3) number of goals scored.
(C) Champions; (Q) Qualified for the phase indicated

==== Results ====
Home \ Away	KRB	SAM	QAS	GHZ	MSN	JIN
Karbalaa	—	1–2	0–3	—	—	1–0
Samaraa	—	—	0–1	—	1–1	1–0
Al-Qasim	—	—	—	2–0	0–0	—
Ghaz Al-Shamal	1–0	0–0	—	—	—	—
Maysan	4–3	—	—	2–2	—	1–1
Al-Jinsiya	—	—	1–4	0–0	—	—

Updated to match(es) played on unknown. Source: Iraq Football Association
Legend: Blue = home team win; Yellow = draw; Red = away team win.
For upcoming matches, an "a" indicates there is an article about the rivalry between the two participants.

=== Group 2 ===
All matches played in Baghdad.

Pos	Team	Pld	W	D	L	GF	GA	GD	Pts	Promotion
1	Zakho (Q)	5	4	0	1	8	2	+6	12	Promotion to the Iraqi Premier League
2	Al-Sinaa	5	4	0	1	8	4	+4	12	
3	Brayati	5	2	2	1	8	8	0	8	
4	Al-Ramadi	5	2	0	3	5	8	−3	6	
5	Suq Al-Shuyukh	5	1	1	3	6	8	−2	4	
6	Al-Kufa	5	0	1	4	4	9	−5	1	

Source: Iraq Football Association
Rules for classification: 1) points; 2) goal difference; 3) number of goals scored.
(Q) Qualified for the phase indicated

==== Results ====
Home \ Away	SIN	RAM	KUF	BRA	SUQ	ZAK
Al-Sinaa	—	1–0	3–1	—	—	1–0
Al-Ramadi	—	—	1–0	—	3–2	—
Al-Kufa	—	—	—	2–2	0–1	—
Brayati	2–1	2–1	—	—	—	0–2
Suq Al-Shuyukh	1–2	—	—	2–2	—	0–1
Zakho	—	3–0	2–1	—	—	—

Updated to match(es) played on unknown. Source: Iraq Football Association
Legend: Blue = home team win; Yellow = draw; Red = away team win.
For upcoming matches, an "a" indicates there is an article about the rivalry between the two participants.

== Final ==
19 July 2019
13:45 GMT

Al-Qasim	0–0	Zakho
Penalties
	4–1

Al-Karkh Stadium, Baghdad

== Others ==
- 2018–19 Iraqi Premier League
- 2018–19 Iraq FA Cup
