= Bismaya SC =

Iraqi football club

- Full name: Bismaya Sport Club
- Founded: 2019; 6 years ago
- Ground: Bismaya Stadium
- Manager: Bahaa Hussein
- League: Iraqi Third Division League
Home colours	Away colours

Bismaya Sport Club (Arabic: نادي بسماية الرياضي), is an Iraqi football team based in Baghdad, that plays in the Iraqi Third Division League.

== Managerial history ==
- (Iraq) Salam Al-Magsousi
- (Iraq) Bahaa Hussein

== See also ==
- 2019–20 Iraq FA Cup
- 2020–21 Iraq FA Cup
