= Louaï El Ani =

Iraqi footballer

Personal information
- Full name: Louaï Majid Sabri El Ani
- Date of birth: 12 July 1997 (age 29)
- Place of birth: Ifrane, Morocco
- Height: 1.76 m (5 ft 9 in)
- Position: Attacking midfielder

Team information
- Current team: Al-Zawraa
- Number: 4

Senior career*
Years	Team	Apps	(Gls)
2012–2017	FUS Rabat		
2017–2020	KAC	70	(20)
2020–2022	Al-Quwa Al-Jawiya		
2022	Kenitra AC	1	(0)
2022–24	Al-Zawraa SC	1	(1)
2024-	Al-Talaba SC	11	(2)

International career^{‡}
2020	Iraq U23	1	(0)
2023–	Iraq	1	(0)
- * Club domestic league appearances and goals ‡ National team caps and goals as of 26 March 2024

Louaï Majid Sabri El Ani (Arabic: لُؤَيّ مَاجِد صَبْرِيّ الْعَانِيّ; born 12 July 1997) is a professional footballer who plays as an attacking midfielder for Al-Zawraa in the Iraqi Premier League. Born in Morocco, he plays for the Iraq national team.

== International career ==
El Ani was born in Morocco to an Iraqi father and Moroccan mother. He has dual citizenship, and was cleared to play for the Iraq national team in December 2019. He debuted for Iraq in a friendly 2–0 loss to Russia on 26 March 2023.

== Honours ==
Al-Quwa Al-Jawiya

- Iraqi Premier League: 2020–21
- Iraq FA Cup: 2020–21
