= Al-Sihha wal-Bi'a SC =

Iraqi football club

- Full name: Al-Sihha wal-Bi'a Sport Club
- Founded: 2013; 12 years ago
- Ground: Al-Sikak Stadium
- Chairman: Wathiq Al-Jubouri
- Manager: Tahseen Mohsin
- League: Iraqi Third Division League
Home colours	Away colours

Al-Sihha wal-Bi'a Sport Club (Arabic: نادي الصحة والبيئة الرياضي), is an Iraqi football team based in Baghdad, that plays in the Iraqi Third Division League.

== Managerial history ==
- (Iraq) Maitham Dael-Haq
- (Iraq) Tahseen Mohsin

== See also ==
- 2019–20 Iraq FA Cup
- 2020–21 Iraq FA Cup
