= Al-Khairat SC =

Iraqi football club

- Full name: Al-Khairat Sport Club
- Founded: 2005; 20 years ago
- Ground: Al-Khairat Stadium
- Chairman: Nabil Mizar
- Manager: Alaa Mohammed Salih
- League: Iraqi Third Division League
Home colours	Away colours

Al-Khairat Sport Club (Arabic: نادي الخيرات الرياضي), is an Iraqi football team based in Karbala, that plays in the Iraqi Third Division League.

== Managerial history ==
- (Iraq) Makki Al-Ghurabi
- (Iraq) Alaa Mohammed Salih

== See also ==
- 2021–22 Iraqi Second Division League
