= Al-Dhafar SC =

Iraqi football club

- Full name: Al-Dhafar Sport Club
- Founded: 2019; 6 years ago
- Ground: Al-Tahaddi Stadium
- Owner: Al-Imam Al-Kadhim College
- Chairman: Ghani Al-Khaqani
- Manager: Murtadha Sabah
- League: Iraqi Third Division League
Home colours	Away colours

Al-Dhafar Sport Club (Arabic: نادي الظفر الرياضي), is an Iraqi football team based in Baghdad.

== Managerial history ==
- (Iraq) Murtadha Sabah

== See also ==
- 2020–21 Iraq FA Cup
