= Joseph Nathaniel =

Nigerian footballer

Personal information
- Full name: Joseph Akanbi Nathaniel
- Date of birth: 1 October 1993 (age 33)
- Place of birth: Lagos, Nigeria
- Position: Midfielder

Team information
- Current team: Al-Hedood

Senior career*
Years	Team	Apps	(Gls)
2014−2016	Sharks		
2016–2017	Shooting Stars		
2017	Lobi Stars		
2017−2018	Al-Nasr SC (Salalah)		
2018−2019	Al-Nasr SC (Benghazi)		
2020−	Al-Hudood		

International career
2015	Nigeria	2	(0)
- * Club domestic league appearances and goals as of 7 September 2020

Joseph Nathaniel (born 1 October 1993) is a Nigerian professional footballer who plays as a midfielder for the Iraqi Premier League team Al-Hedood.

== Honours ==
Al-Nasr

- Sultan Qaboos Cup: 2017–18

Individual

- Soccer Iraq Goal of the Season: 2020–21
