= Al-Jamahir SC =

Iraqi football club

- Full name: Al-Jamahir Sport Club
- Founded: 1973; 53 years ago
- Ground: Al-Jamahir Stadium
- Chairman: Kadhim Ali Al-Haideri
- Manager: Haider Fadhel
- League: Iraqi Third Division League
Home colours	Away colours

Al-Jamahir Sport Club (Arabic: نادي الجماهير الرياضي), is an Iraqi football team based in Karbala, that plays in Iraqi Third Division League.

== History ==
Al-Jamahir Sports Club was established in 1973, the team played for the first time in the Iraqi Premier League at the 1988–89 season in the Central Group, and did not achieve good results, so they relegated to Iraqi First Division League at the end of the season.

== Famous players ==
- (Iraq) Sahib Abbas

== Honours ==
=== Friendly ===
- Central Euphrates Football Championship

Winners (1): 2019

== See also ==
- 2020–21 Iraq FA Cup
