= Alaa Raad =

Iraqi footballer (born 1998)

Personal information
- Full name: Alaa Raad Shihab Al Hamadani
- Date of birth: 20 February 1998 (age 28)
- Place of birth: Basra, Iraq
- Height: 1.77 m (5 ft 10 in)
- Position: Right-back

Team information
- Current team: Erbil

Senior career*
Years	Team	Apps	(Gls)
2017–2019	Naft Al-Basra		
2019–2021	Al-Zawraa		
2021–2022	Naft Maysan		
2022–2024	Naft Al-Basra		
2024–2025	Zakho		
2025–	Erbil		

International career^{‡}
2019–2020	Iraq U23	5	(0)
- * Club domestic league appearances and goals as of 2 June 2026 ‡ National team caps and goals as of 14 January 2020

Alaa Raad Shihab Al Hamadani (born 20 February 1998) is an Iraqi professional footballer who plays as a right-back for Iraqi Stars League side Erbil.

== Club career ==
Raad started playing for Naft Al-Basra after being scouted and officially signed on May 12, 2016. On December 10, 2017, he scored his first Premier League goal against Al-Hussein in a match that ended in a 2–2 draw., and on August 5, 2019, he officially joined Al-Zawraa, where the deal was regarded as a signing of a standout talent. On July 11, 2020, Al-Zawraa management renewed the player's contract for an additional season. On July 19, 2021, he missed a penalty kick for Al-Zawraa in the Iraq FA Cup final penalty shootout, as Al-Quwa Al-Jawiya won the title after the match ended in a 0–0 draw. He featured in the League's Team of the Week for both round 6 and round 24.

He then moved to Naft Maysan, signing a one-season contract. The following season, he returned to Naft Al-Basra, where he shined by scoring several crucial goals, including strikes against Al-Shorta, Amanat Baghdad, and Al-Minaa. On July 20, 2024, he scored the survival-securing goal that saved the club from relegation, netting the winner in the final minutes of the last round match against Al-Qasim, which ended in a 2–1 victory for Naft Al-Basra.

In August 2024, he officially transferred to Zakho. On August 10, 2025, he moved to Erbil, and on June 22, 2026, he transferred to Al-Minaa, with the club officially announcing his signing.

== International career ==
Raad was first picked to represent Iraq in 2020, when the under-23 coach Abdul-Ghani Shahad selected him to be a part of his 23-man squad to play in 2020 AFC U-23 Championship qualification and 2020 AFC U-23 Championship.
