= Bani Saad SC =

Iraqi football club

- Full name: Bani Saad Sport Club
- Founded: 2004; 21 years ago
- Ground: Bani Saad Stadium
- Chairman: Miqdad Talib Al-Saadi
- Manager: Basil Dawood Al-Saadi
- League: Iraqi Third Division League
Home colours	Away colours

Bani Saad Sport Club (Arabic: نادي بني سعد الرياضي), is an Iraqi football team based in Diyala, that plays in Iraqi Third Division League.

== Managerial history ==
- (Iraq) Basil Al Askour
- (Iraq) Kadhim Hussein
- (Iraq) Ramzi Mohsin
- (Iraq) Basil Dawood Al-Saadi

== See also ==
- 2019–20 Iraq FA Cup
- 2020–21 Iraq FA Cup
- 2021–22 Iraq FA Cup
