= Malik Ismaila Antiri =

Ghanaian footballer

Malik Ismaila Antiri (born 25 December 1994) is a Ghanaian former footballer who plays as a center-back for Al-Qasim SC and the Ghana national football team.

== Club career ==
On July 1, 2016, Malik joined the Ghanaian club Tema Youth F.C. Malik Ismaila Antiri played for various Football Teams include Tema Youth F.C., Chabab Ghazieh SC, Bourj FC, Nojom Ajdabiya and Al-Sinaa SC.

He played for the Ghana national football team including World Cup.
