= Al-Zaeem SC =

Iraqi football club

- Full name: Al-Zaeem Sport Club
- Founded: 2005; 20 years ago
- Ground: Al-Zaeem Stadium
- Chairman: Abdul-Aziz Abdullah Shabram
- Manager: Asaad Wadi
- League: Iraqi Third Division League
Home colours	Away colours

Al-Zaeem Sport Club (Arabic: نادي الزعيم الرياضي), is an Iraqi football team based in Al-Suwaira, Wasit, that plays in Iraqi Third Division League.

== Naming ==
"Al-Zaeem", which means the leader, is the nickname given to the former Iraqi prime minister Abd al-Karim Qasim, hence the name of the club, and it is the first and most popular club in Wasit.

== Managerial history ==
- (Iraq) Abdullah Salih
- (Iraq) Asaad Wadi

== See also ==
- 2020–21 Iraq FA Cup
- 2021–22 Iraq FA Cup
