= Raheem Owolabi Isiaka =

Nigerian footballer

Personal information
- Full name: Raheem Owolabi Isiaka
- Date of birth: 14 June 1991 (age 35)
- Place of birth: Lagos, Nigeria
- Height: 1.79 m (5 ft 10 in)
- Position: Forward

Team information
- Current team: Al-Hedood FC

Senior career*
Years	Team	Apps	(Gls)
2008–2010	First Bank F.C.	61	(28)
2010–2011	Shooting Stars FC	20	(11)
2012–2013	Najaf FC	20	(13)
2013–2014	Al Zawraa	23	(11)
2014–2015	Masafi Al-Shamal SC	12	(6)
2015–2016	Najaf FC	15	(7)
2016–2017	Karbalaa FC	8	(3)
2017–	Al-Hedood FC	8	(3)
- * Club domestic league appearances and goals as of 20 June 2018

Raheem Owolabi Isiaka (born 14 June 1991) is a Nigerian footballer who plays as a centre forward for Iraqi Premier League club Al-Hedood FC.

== Career ==
Owolabi has played club football for First Bank and Shooting Stars.

He left Shooting Stars at the end of the 2011-12 season, going to play in the Iraqi league. In 2013, he played in the Iraqi Premier League with Al-Zawraa.

In September 2014, he signed a one-year term contract with Iraqi Premier League club, Al-Masafi until 2015.

He moved back to Al-Najaf FC in January 2016 and Karbalaa FC in 2017.
