= Qalat Saleh SC =

Iraqi football club

- Full name: Qalat Saleh Sport Club
- Founded: 1992; 33 years ago
- Ground: Qalat Saleh Stadium
- Chairman: Ali Abdul-Hussein
- League: Iraqi Third Division League
Home colours	Away colours

Qalat Saleh Sport Club (Arabic: نادي قلعة صالح الرياضي), is an Iraqi football team based in Qal'at Saleh District, Maysan.

== History ==
Qalat Saleh Club was founded in 1992 in Maysan.

== See also ==
- 2018–19 Iraq FA Cup
- 2021–22 Iraqi Second Division League
