= Al-Munshaat wal-Shakhsiyat SC =

Iraqi football club

- Full name: Al-Munshaat wal-Shakhsiyat Sport Club
- Founded: 2020; 5 years ago
- Ground: Abu Noas Stadium
- Owner: Ministry of Defence
- Chairman: Ismail Nima Ghailan
- Manager: Ahmed Jawad
- League: Iraqi Third Division League
Home colours	Away colours

Al-Munshaat wal-Shakhsiyat Sport Club (Arabic: نادي المنشآت والشخصيات الرياضي), also known as Himayat Al-Munshaat, is an Iraqi football club based in Baghdad that plays in the Iraqi Third Division League.

== Managerial history ==
- (Iraq) Ahmed Jawad

== See also ==
- 2020–21 Iraq FA Cup
