= Muhanad Madyen =

Libyan footballer (born 1994)

Personal information
- Full name: Muhanad Mustafa Almabrouk Madyen Aissa
- Date of birth: 25 March 1994 (age 32)
- Place of birth: Sorman, Libya
- Height: 1.83 m (6 ft 0 in)
- Position: Midfielder

Team information
- Current team: Naft Al-Basra

Youth career
- Rafik Sorman

Senior career*
Years	Team	Apps	(Gls)
2012–2014	Rafik Sorman		
2014–2016	Al Hilal		
2017	Olympic Azzaweya		
2017–2018	Al Ahli Tripol		
2018–2019	Rafik Sorman		
2019–2020	ES Sahel		
2020–2021	Al-Khaleej		
2021–	Naft Al-Basra		

International career
2018–	Libya	15	(0)
- * Club domestic league appearances and goals

Muhanad Madyen (born 25 March 1994) is a Libyan footballer who plays as a midfielder.
