= Al-Taliea SC =

Iraqi football club

- Full name: Al-Taliea Sport Club
- Founded: 2019; 6 years ago
- Ground: Al-Taliea Stadium
- Manager: Ali Wali
- League: Iraqi Third Division League
Home colours	Away colours

Al-Taliea Sport Club (Arabic: نادي الطليعة الرياضي), is an Iraqi football team based in Baghdad, that plays in the Iraqi Third Division League.

== Managerial history ==
- (Iraq) Ali Wali

== See also ==
- 2020–21 Iraq FA Cup
