= Al-Zafaraniya SC =

Iraqi football club

- Full name: Al-Zafaraniya Sport Club
- Founded: 2004; 21 years ago
- Ground: Al-Zafaraniya Stadium
- Chairman: Khalil Uglah Al-Ebadi
- Manager: Jabbar Hamid
- League: Iraqi Third Division League
| Home colours | Away colours |

Al-Zafaraniya Sport Club (Arabic: نادي الزعفرانية الرياضي), is an Iraqi football team based in Baghdad, that plays in the Iraqi Third Division League.

== Managerial history ==
- (Iraq) Waad Saleh
- (Iraq) Habib Jaafar
- (Iraq) Ayad Shaalan
- (Iraq) Atta Hassan
- (Iraq) Jabbar Hamid

== See also ==
- 2020–21 Iraq FA Cup
- 2021–22 Iraq FA Cup
