= Al-Atheer SC =

Iraqi football club

- Full name: Al-Atheer Football Club
- Founded: 2006; 19 years ago
- Ground: Al-Tahadi Stadium
- Chairman: Abdul Karim Younis Aylan
- Manager: Adel Khudhair
- League: Iraqi Third Division League
Home colours	Away colours

Al-Atheer Sport Club (Arabic: نادي الأثير الرياضي) is an Iraqi football team based in Baghdad, that competes in the Iraqi Third Division League.

== Managerial history ==
- (Iraq) Adel Khudhair

== See also ==
- 2020–21 Iraq FA Cup
