= Al-Nasr wal-Salam SC =

Iraqi football club

- Full name: Al-Nasr wal-Salam Sport Club
- Founded: 2004; 21 years ago
- Ground: Al-Nasr wal-Salam Stadium
- Chairman: Hussein Majeed Al-Shafi
- Manager: Raed Ismail
- League: Iraqi Third Division League
Home colours	Away colours

Al-Nasr wal-Salam Sport Club (Arabic: نادي النصر والسلام الرياضي), is an Iraqi football team based in Baghdad, that plays in the Iraqi Third Division League.

== Managerial history ==
- (Iraq) Odah Shukor
- (Iraq) Raed Ismail

== See also ==
- 2019–20 Iraq FA Cup
- 2020–21 Iraq FA Cup
