= Al-Husseiniya SC =

Iraqi football club

- Full name: Al-Husseiniya Sport Club
- Founded: 1994; 31 years ago
- Ground: Al-Husseiniyah Stadium
- Chairman: Razzaq Abboud Jafar
- Manager: Dhiaa Younis Abed-Aon
- League: Iraqi Third Division League
Home colours	Away colours

Al-Husseiniya Sport Club (Arabic: نادي الحسينية الرياضي), is an Iraqi football team based in Karbala, that plays in the Iraqi Third Division League.

== Managerial history ==
- (Iraq) Fadhel Mahdi
- (Iraq) Ali Hassoun

== See also ==
- 2018–19 Iraq FA Cup
- 2019–20 Iraq FA Cup
