= Al-Mohandessin SC =

Iraqi football club

- Full name: Al-Mohandessin Sport Club
- Founded: 2016; 10 years ago
- Ground: Fawzy Stadium
- Chairman: Sabeeh Al-Gharrawi
- Manager: Karim Mahmoud
- League: Iraqi Third Division League
Home colours	Away colours

Al-Mohandessin Sport Club (Arabic: نادي المهندسين الرياضي) is an Iraqi football team based in Baghdad, that plays in Iraqi Third Division League.

== Managerial history ==
- (Iraq) Karim Nafea
- (Iraq) Karim Mahmoud
- (Iraq) Khalaf Habash

== See also ==
- 2016–17 Iraq FA Cup
- 2018–19 Iraq FA Cup
- 2021–22 Iraq FA Cup
