= Jenaain Babil SC =

Iraqi football club

- Full name: Jenaain Babil Football Club
- Founded: 2020; 5 years ago
- Ground: Jenaain Babil Stadium
- Chairman: Alaa Lafta
- Manager: Salah Azeez
- League: Iraqi Third Division League
Home colours	Away colours

Jenaain Babil Sport Club (Arabic: نادي جنائن بابل الرياضي), is an Iraqi football team based in Babil, that plays in Iraqi Third Division League.

== Managerial history ==
- (Iraq) Maitham Ali Hanoon
- (Iraq) Nadhum Hassan
- (Iraq) Mohammed Kadhim
- (Iraq) Jaafar Sarhan
- (Iraq) Muhannad Fadhel
- (Iraq) Salah Azeez

== See also ==
- 2020–21 Iraq FA Cup
- 2021–22 Iraq FA Cup
- 2022–23 Iraq FA Cup
