= Bismayah New City =

Bismayah New City Arabic: بسماية
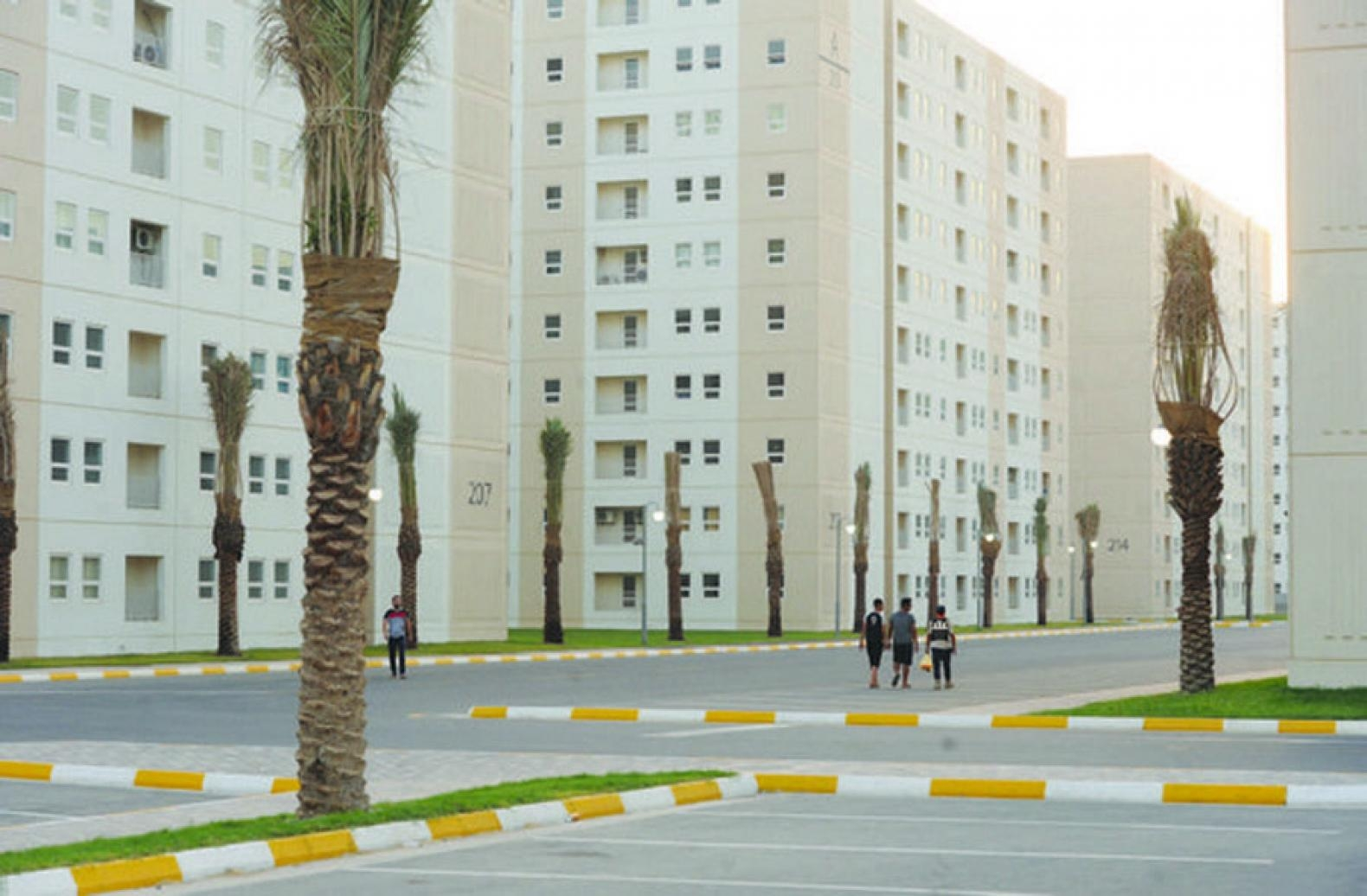
- Bismayah New City.

- Location within Iraq
- Coordinates: 33°11′35″N 44°37′05″E
- Country: Iraq
- Governorate: Diyala Governorate
- Established/Built: 2013-Present (Ongoing construction)

Area
  - Land: 6.9 sq mi (18 km^{2})

Population (2023)
  - Total: 100,000
- Time zone: Arabia Standard Time (UTC+3)
- Website: www.bismayah.org

Bismayah (Arabic: بسماية) is a city about 10 kilometers (6.2 mi) southeast of Baghdad. It is a part of the Diyala Governorate.

== History ==
Bismayah is the first and the largest city development project of the past decade in Iraq. Bismayah is located 10km southeast of Baghdad on the main highway connecting Baghdad-Kut, spread over a total area of 1,830 hectares, and is being built to accommodate around 600,000 occupants in a total of 100,000 residential units. Bismayah was planned by the Baghdad Investment Commission to build 100,000 homes and later joined by external investors in efforts to help rebuild Iraq.

The new city will be constructed according to the latest international standards with full services including schools, clinics, and commercial, social and entertainment centers. Moreover, a modern road network is being built specifically for the project, linking it to the highway and thus connecting it to the Iraqi capital.

The city is a planned community aimed to support lower-middle class residents.

The government of Iraq will develop the public facilities such as education, religious, welfare, and commercial facilities as well as infrastructure such as water, electricity and sewage treatment plants. According to its developers, Bismayah is intended to fill the lives of 600,000 citizens of Baghdad with happiness and be the most outstanding world class city beyond Iraq and Middle East as the first project of the National Housing Program.

== Design ==
The residential areas are situated around Bismayah centre, which will contain numerous office buildings, markets, mosques, and venues. A green space is situated between the residential area and the centre.

The residential buildings have a similar appearance to plattenbau-style apartments, but are U-shaped. Parking lots are situated inside the 'U'. Each residential building is 10 floors high and contains an elevator. A green space surrounds each residential building, with walkways connecting the buildings.

The residential area is in close proximity to various amenities such as youth and cultural centres, hospitals, police stations, firehouses, and schools.

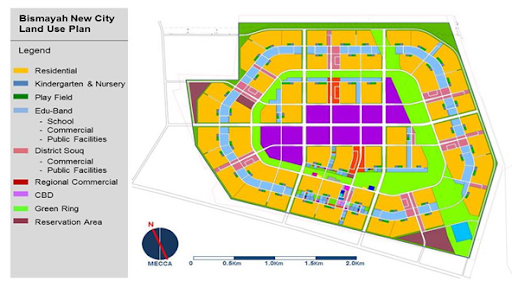

== Construction ==
Completion of the project was originally scheduled for 2020 but has been deferred to 2027 due to the unstable political situation in the Middle East and delayed payments from the Iraqi government.

As of end-June, the progress rates of the construction of houses and other infrastructure facilities were 44.83% and 28.87%, respectively, according to Hanwha.

Hanwha has stopped construction on the project although Saudi Arabia has expressed its willingness to continue the construction of residential units in the Bismaya residential complex near the capital city of Baghdad.

the commission highlighted its ongoing efforts in the financing process of the Bismaya residential project. Chairman of the commission, Haider Mohammed Makiya, discussed collaborative measures with Saudi Minister of Investment, Khalid Al-Falih, to secure funding for the Bismaya project.

On 2024 January 11, Hanwha decided to continue the project and finish the B8 area.

== Neighbourhoods ==
The city is to contain two sections. The first section is the city centre. The second section is the residential section, encompassing the residential areas.

The residential area is divided into districts labelled from A to H:

- District A consists of 14,280 residential units
- District B consists of 15,240 residential units
- District C consists of 10,200 residential units
- District D consists of 9,480 residential units
- District E consists of 13,920 residential units
- District F consists of 13,440 residential units
- District G consists of 10.920 residential units
- District H consists of 12,600 residential units

Each district contains blocks of residential areas, and each residential building is numbered after, for example District A-1 1.

Services such as schools are assigned to each district.

== Attractions ==
- Bismayah Mall
- Bismayah Lookout Tower

== Pictures ==
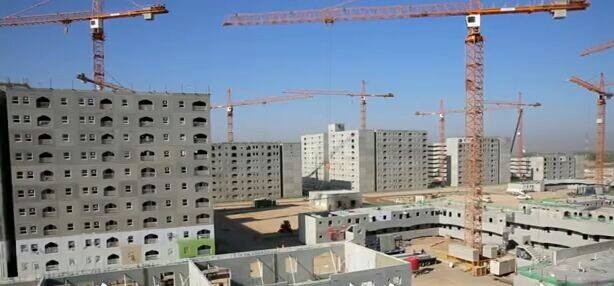
Construction in Bismayah on 25 September 2014.
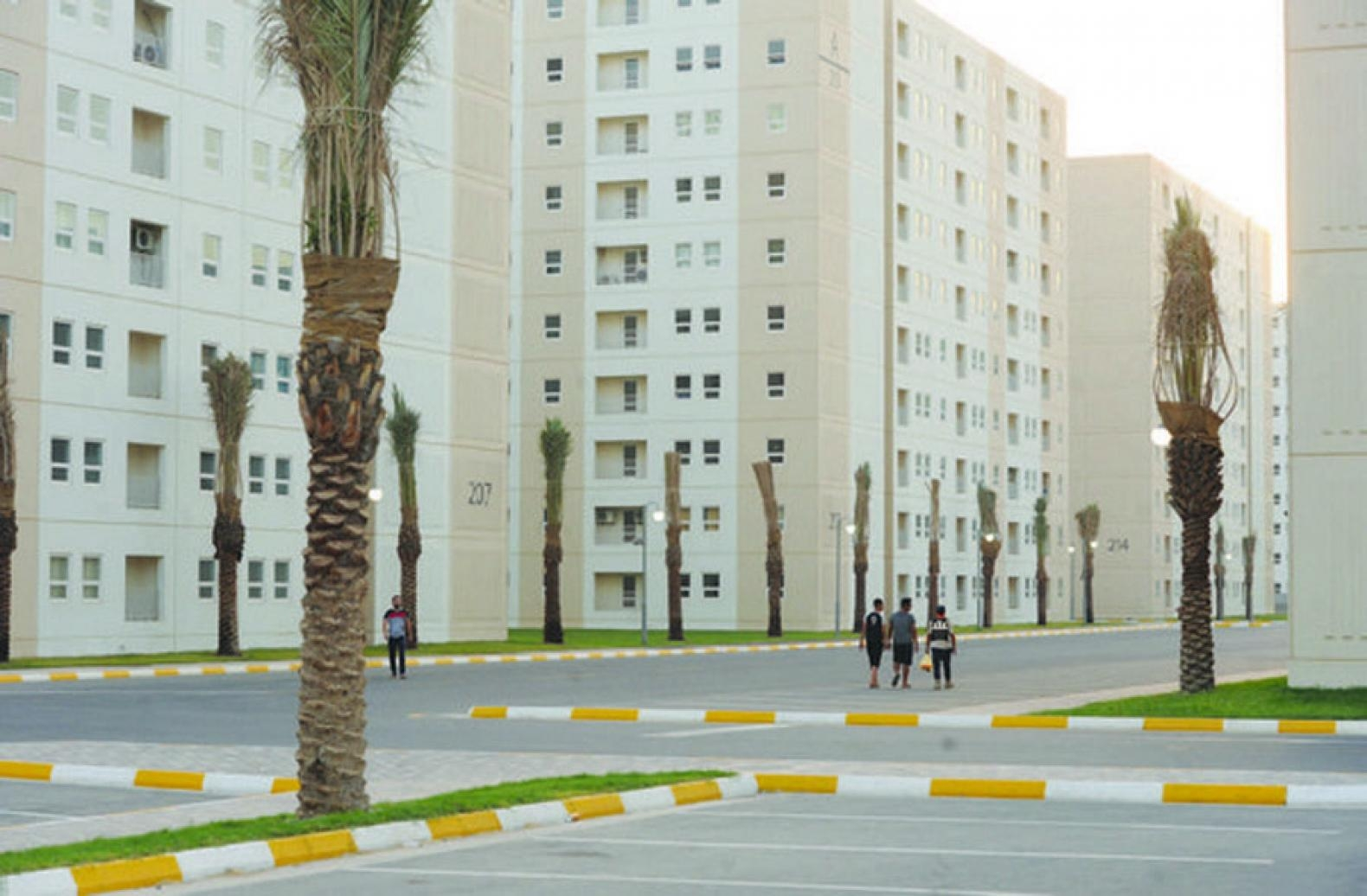
Roads of basimiyah completed

== See also ==
- List of places in Iraq
