= Al-Qurna SC =

Iraqi football club

- Full name: Al-Qurna Sport Club
- Founded: 1974; 51 years ago
- Ground: Al-Qurna Stadium
- Chairman: Faleh Hassan
- Manager: Ali Najem
- League: Iraqi First Division League
Home colours	Away colours

Al-Qurna Sport Club (Arabic: نادي القرنة الرياضي), is an Iraqi football team based in Al-Qurna, Basra, that plays in Iraqi First Division League.

== Managerial history ==
- (Iraq) Fahad Jamil
- (Iraq) Hatam Ghalib
- (Iraq) Ali Najem

== See also ==
- 2020–21 Iraq FA Cup
- 2021–22 Iraq FA Cup
