= Ahmed Jalal (footballer) =

Iraqi footballer

Ahmed Jalal Hassan
Personal information
- Date of birth: 17 March 1998 (age 28)
- Position: Midfielder

Team information
- Current team: Naft Al-Basra
- Number: 11

Senior career*
Years	Team	Apps	(Gls)
2016–2018	Naft Al-Janoob		
2018–2020	Al-Zawraa		
2020–2021	Al-Shorta	13	(0)
2021–2023	Naft Al-Basra		
2023–2024	Al-Zawraa		
2024–	Naft Al-Basra		

International career^{‡}
2015–2016	Iraq U20	4	(0)
2017–	Iraq U23	0	(0)
2017–	Iraq	2	(0)
- * Club domestic league appearances and goals as of 26 July 2021 ‡ National team caps and goals as of 26 August 2017

Ahmed Jalal Hassan (born 17 March 1998) is an Iraqi footballer who plays as a midfielder for Naft Al-Basra in the Iraqi Premier League.

== International career ==
On 26 August 2017, Ahmed Jalal made his first international cap with Iraq against Syria in a friendly match.

== Honours ==
Al-Zawraa

- Iraq FA Cup: 2018–19
