= Al-Qasim SC =

Iraqi football club

- Full name: Al-Qasim Sport club
- Founded: 1973; 53 years ago
- Ground: Al Kifl Stadium
- Capacity: 8,000
- Chairman: Hussein Ali Al-Kaabi
- Manager: Ayman Hakeem
- League: Iraqi Premier Division League
- 2025–26: Iraq Stars League, 20th of 20 (relegated)
Home colours	Away colours

Al-Qasim Sport Club (Arabic: نادي القاسم الرياضي) is an Iraqi football club based in Al-Qasim City, Babil, that competes in the Iraqi Premier Division League.

== History ==
Al-Qasim Club was founded in 1973 by a group of young athletes. The team have been in the Iraqi First Division League for many years and have not been able to qualify for the Premier League due to lack of financial support and lack of a good stadium.

In the 2015–16 season, the team strengthened their ranks with good players and was about to qualify for the Premier League, but finished second behind Al-Bahri in Elite Stage, and Al-Bahri qualified. As well as in the 2017–18 season, but they finished second behind Erbil in Final stage, and Erbil qualified.

Al-Qasim won the 2018–19 Iraqi First Division League title after defeating Zakho in the final penalty shootout 4–1, after the match with a draw in the full time. As a result, they were promoted to the 2019–20 Iraqi Premier League for first time, and chose Al Kifl Stadium as their home stadium for their Premier League matches.

== Current squad ==
=== First-team squad ===
As of 15 September 2024

Note: Flags indicate national team as defined under FIFA eligibility rules; some limited exceptions apply. Players may hold more than one non-FIFA nationality.

No.	Pos.	Nation	Player
1	GK	IRQ	Laith Maan
5	DF	MAW	Dennis Chembezi ^{FGN}
6	DF	IRQ	Karrar Faleh
7	MF	IRQ	Ammar Dakhel
8	MF	IRQ	Al-Hareth Hatam
9	FW	IRQ	Falah Abdul Karim
11	FW	IRQ	Haider Abd Al-Rahim
13	DF	IRQ	Mujtaba Mohsin
14	DF	IRQ	Hussein Mohsin
17	FW	IRQ	Hussein Abdul-Wahid
18	FW	GHA	Karim Abubakar ^{FGN}
19	DF	IRQ	Moammel Jameel

No.	Pos.	Nation	Player
20	MF	BFA	Elie Sou ^{FGN}
28	MF	IRQ	Muamal Rashed
29	MF	IRQ	Noor Al-Hussein
33	DF	IRQ	Muntadher Abdulsada
55	DF	IRQ	Ahmed Noor
66	DF	IRQ	Mohammed Al-Baqer
79	GK	IRQ	Ali Khaled
95	MF	NGR	Odeni George ^{FGN}
99	MF	IRQ	Mohammed Khalid
—	DF	GHA	Malik Ismaila Antiri ^{FGN}

=== Out on loan ===
Note: Flags indicate national team as defined under FIFA eligibility rules; some limited exceptions apply. Players may hold more than one non-FIFA nationality.

No.	Pos.	Nation	Player
—	MF	IRQ	Ali Haidar (on loan at Diyala until the end of the 2022–23 season)

== Current technical staff ==
Position	Name	Nationality
Manager:	Ali Abdul Jabbar	(Iraq)
Assistant manager:	Saad Attiya	(Iraq)
Goalkeeping coach:	Hussein Ali	(Iraq)
U-19 Manager:	Jaafar Talib	(Iraq)
Director of football:	Rasoul Jassim	(Iraq)
Administrative director:	Naim Raheem	(Iraq)
Administrative director:	Ali Dhaher	(Iraq)
Club doctor:	Abbas Sami	(Iraq)
Club doctor:	Baqer Mohammed	(Iraq)

Updated to match played 14 August 2022
Source: kooora.com

== Managerial history ==
- (Iraq) Jassim Jaber (2018–2019)
- (Iraq) Hussam Fawzi (2019–2020)
- (Iraq) Jassim Jaber (2020)
- (Iraq) Falah Hassan & Chasib Sultan (2020–2021)
- (Iraq) Adel Nima (2021)
- (Iraq) Qusay Munir (2021)
- (Iraq) Sami Bahat (2021)
- (Iraq) Chasib Sultan (2021–2022)
- (Iraq) Ali Abdul Jabbar (2022–2024)
- (Syria) Ayman Hakeem (2024–present)

== Honours ==
- Iraqi Premier Division League (second tier)
  - Winner (1): 2018–19
