= Al-Taji SC =

Iraqi football club

- Full name: Al-Taji Sport Club
- Nickname: Al-Numoor (The Tigers)
- Founded: 2003; 23 years ago
- Ground: Al-Taji Stadium
- Capacity: 5,000
- President: Taha Abid Halatah
- Manager: Thiyab Nuhair
- League: Iraqi First Division League
Home colours	Away colours

Al-Taji Sport Club (Arabic: نادي التاجي الرياضي), is an Iraqi football team based in Al-Taji, Baghdad, the team competes in the Iraqi First Division League. In 2011 the team has played one season in Iraqi Premier League.

== Stadium ==
Currently the team plays at the 5000 capacity Al-Taji Stadium.

== Managerial history ==
- (Iraq) Zuhair Abdul-Ridha
- (Iraq) Thiyab Nuhair
