= Al-Hudood SC =

Iraqi football club

Al-Hedod
- Full name: Al-Hedod Sports Club
- Founded: 1976; 50 years ago
- Ground: Sharar Haidar Stadium (Temporary)
- Capacity: 5,150
- President: Foad Nasser Al-Rikabi
- Manager: Haidar Abdul-Amir
- League: Iraqi Premier Division League
- 2025–26: Iraqi Premier Division League, 3rd of 20
Home colours	Away colours

Al-Hedod Sports Club (Arabic: نادي الحدود الرياضي, lit. 'The Borders Sports Club') is an Iraqi professional sports club based in Falastin Street, East Districts of the Tigris River, Baghdad. It has teams in various sports including football, basketball, Jujutsu, kickboxing and wrestling. The best known section of the club are the Jujutsu, kickboxing and wrestling teams who play in the Arab and Asian tournaments as representatives of Iraq.

== History ==
Al-Hedod SC was founded in 1976 by the Border Guards Command of the MOI, In 2008–09 season, the football team was playing in the Iraqi Premier League for first time. It was less successful during the first two seasons, and relegated to Iraqi First Division League at the end of the 2009–10 season. But regained promotion one year later, it played in league in 2011–12 season, and was relegated to First Division League again. But two years later, the team was promoted to the Iraqi Premier League, has resumed playing in the league since the 2014–15 season until it was relegated to the First Division League in the 2020–21 season.

In addition to the club's participation in the Iraqi Premier League and Iraq FA Cup, the club has a military football team playing in the Interior Ministry League. In January 2018, they beat Himayat Al-Munshaat wal-Shakhsiyat on penalties to win the Iraqi Ministry of Interior Cup.

== Current squad ==
=== First-team squad ===
As of 19 September 2024

Note: Flags indicate national team as defined under FIFA eligibility rules; some limited exceptions apply. Players may hold more than one non-FIFA nationality.

No.	Pos.	Nation	Player
1	GK	IRQ	Abdul Rahman Mohammed
2	DF	IRQ	Hussein Abtan
3	DF	IRQ	Saif Kareem
5	DF	IRQ	Ahmed Abdul-Ridha
8	MF	SEN	Romuald Dacosta
9	FW	IRQ	Shirwan Kurdistan
11	MF	IRQ	Atheer Salih
13	MF	IRQ	Hussein Jabbar
14	DF	IRQ	Ali Hassan
15	MF	IRQ	Abbas Majid
16	FW	IRQ	Hussein Abd-Alredha
17	MF	GHA	Farouk Mohammed
18	FW	IRQ	Ali Karim
19	DF	IRQ	Hussein Jassim

No.	Pos.	Nation	Player
20	FW	IRQ	Mohammed Jameel
21	MF	IRQ	Murtadha Jamal
22	GK	IRQ	Saqr Ajail
23	MF	LBN	Hasan Srour
24	DF	IRQ	Saif Hatem Abbood
25	MF	IRQ	Baqer Attwan
30	GK	IRQ	Hayder Basim
33	FW	GHA	Denny Antwi
35	MF	IRQ	Ahmad Fadhil
44	DF	FRA	Arnold Temanfo
77	FW	IRQ	Muhaiman Salim
82	DF	IRQ	Ali Akbar
88	FW	IRQ	Ahmed Al-Sarori

== Current technical staff ==
Position	Name	Nationality
Manager:	Haidar Abdul-Amir	(Iraq)
Assistant manager:	Firas Al-Shaikhly	(Sweden)
Assistant manager:	Qasim Farhan	(Iraq)
Fitness coach:	Faris Jihad	(Iraq)
Goalkeeping coach:	Hisham Ali	(Iraq)
Director of football:	Hazim Taymouz	(Iraq)
Administrative director:	Muslim Karim	(Iraq)
Club doctor:	Firas Al-Minshedawi	(Iraq)

Updated to match played 10 October 2021
Source: shafaq.com

== Managerial history ==
- (Iraq) Adel Nima (2008–2012)
- (Iraq) Abdul Ameer Naji (2012)
- (Iraq) Thair Adnan (2012–2013)
- (Iraq) Adel Nima (2013–2014)
- (Iraq) Ali Wahab (2014–2015)
- (Iraq) Adel Nima (2015–2017)
- (Iraq) Mudhafar Jabbar (2017–2018)
- (Iraq) Adel Nima (2018–2019)
- (Iraq) Mudhafar Jabbar (2019–2021)
- (Iraq) Ammar Hussien (2021–2021)
- (Iraq) Abbas Attiya (2021)
- (Iraq) Adel Nima (2021–2024)
- (Iraq) Haidar Abdul-Amir (2024–present)

== Honours ==
- Iraqi Premier Division League (second tier)
  - Winners (1): 2021–22
