= Shamiya =

Shamiya, Al Shamiya or variants may refer to:

== Places ==
- Al-Shamiya District, Iraq
  - Al-Shamiya (Iraq), a city
  - Al-Shamiya SC, a sports club
- Shamiya, Kuwait
  - Al-Shamiya FC, a football club
- Al-Shamiyah, Syria

== People ==
- Hilla Shamia (born 1983), Israeli product designer

== See also ==
- Levant Front (الجبهة الشامية, al Jabhat al-Shamiyah), a Syrian revolutionary group
