= Hilla (given name) =

Hilla is a primarily feminine given name with multiple origins. It is a Finnish feminine given name meaning "cloudberry" . It is very popular in the country, ranking 12th in 2024. It is also a Germanic languages diminutive for names containing the element hil. It is also a spelling variant of the Hebrew name Hila. Hilla is also used as an English translation of a name in use in Arabic as حيلة, in Bangla as হিল্লা, in Hindi as हिल्ला, and in Urdu as حلّ. It has different meanings, including "rain shower" and the "start of the lunar month." The name is also in use in African countries such as Ghana, with different origins.

== Women ==
- Hilla Becher (1934–2015), German conceptual photographer
- Hilla Rustomji Faridoonji (1872–1956), Indian educationist and political activist
- Hilla Nachshon (born 1980), Israeli television host, actress and former model
- Hilla Shamia (born 1983), Israeli product designer
- Hilla Sheriff (1903–1988), American physician
- Hilla von Rebay (born Hildegard Freiin Rebay von Ehrenwiesen; 1890–1967), German-American artist
- Hilla Vidor (born 1975), Israeli actress

== Men ==
- Hilla Limann (1934–1998), Ghanaian diplomat and politician
