= Ammar Al-Madany =

Iraqi politician

Ammar Al-Madany is the current governor of Diwaniyah province, Iraq.
