= Nugra Salman Prison =

Former prison in Iraq

- Nugra Salman Prison in 2006

- Location in Iraq
- Location: Al-Salman District, Muthanna Governorate, Iraq; 30.5055°N 44.5675°E
- Status: Abandoned
- Security class: Political prison
- Capacity: 6,000–8,000 (estimated)
- Opened: 1930
- Closed: 2003
- Former name: Nugrat al-Salman, Nigrat Salman
- Managed by: Kingdom of Iraq (1930–1958), Republic of Iraq (1958–2003)

Notable prisoners
- Victims of the Anfal campaign, detainees from the Dujail massacre, Feyli Kurds

Nugra Salman Prison (Arabic: سجن نقرة سلمان, lit. 'Pit of Salman'), also known as Nugrat al-Salman or Nigrat Salman is a former facility near the village of Salman in the Al-Salman District in the desert of the Muthanna Governorate in Iraq. It was constructed in 1930 and used by the Hashemite Monarchy and later also by the governments of Abd al-Karim Qasim and Saddam Hussein.

== Description ==
Constructed in 1930, it is located near the Iraqi Saudi Arabian border beside the village Salman in the Muthanna Governorate. About 1.5 kilometer beside the village is Nugra Salman, with a watchtower in each corner. It lies within a depression in the southern desert of Iraq. At times the prison was not in use and villagers have kept their cattle in the building.

== History ==
It was originally a center of command of the southern Iraqi Desert Region Police and a station to monitor the nomadic Bedouins, built by John Bagot Glubb when he was commander of the regional police, in the 1920s, since the area is remote.

It was used for the imprisonment of political prisoners and in 1964, the people of Samawah gained popular fame for rescuing over 1,000 political prisoners of the Iraqi Communist Party who were sent in a "Train of Death" (qutar al maut) in metal cargo rolling stock from Baghdad to Samawah en route to the Nigret Al Salman prison in 50 °C (122 °F) heat. The train was attacked by the city's people at the railway station, and the dehydrated prisoners were watered and fed. Over 100 of the prisoners had already perished.

During the persecution of the Feyli Kurds by the Government of Saddam Hussein, Kurdish men considered of being able to fight, were also secluded in the prison if they were not deported to Iran. In 1982, after a failed assassination attempt on Saddam Hussein in Dujail, dozens of its inhabitants were imprisoned in the prison facility. In the early eighties it was abandoned for some years before a new prison was built in the late 1980s.

During the Anfal campaign directed at Kurds, thousands of prisoners were sent to Nugra Salman, and Human Rights Watch (HRW) estimates that the prison population was between 6'000 and 8'000.

The first group consisted of elderly between 50 and 90 years of age and arrived in early April transported in a caravan of sealed buses coming from detention camps the north of Iraq. In May, another group of elderly from the region around the Lesser Zab arrived. In the summer months, groups of women arrived together with their children coming from Dibs, the women detention camp. In August 1988, a hundreds of prisoners arrived from Halabja, who having returned from Iran, were sent to Nugra Salman. The group of Halabja included, people of all ages, men, women and children.

In September the Government of Iraq announced an Amnesty after which Nugra Salmans inmates were released, but in most cases not allowed to return to their villages and interned in camps under military rule until 1991, when the Kurdistan region achieved autonomy. The prison was in use until 2003, when it was abandoned.

Death train and prison

On the morning of July 3, 1963, a presidential decree was issued ordering the transfer of the national elite detained in Prison No. (1) - one of the prisons of Camp Rashid - to Naqrat al-Salman prison. Indeed, those included in the decree were gathered without knowing where they were going, without knowing that their names had been determined according to a presidential decree intended to kill them all. But the regime leaders agreed to transfer them by means of the innovative mass death train, and if they did not die, they would be executed in Naqrat al-Salman prison by Brigadier General Abdul Ghani al-Rawi, who was supposed to execute (500) prisoners of No. (1), which was later reduced to (300), then to (150), and finally to (30). Due to the small number, Abdul Ghani al-Rawi refused to go to Samawah and carry out the order.

== Notable prisoners ==
- Muthaffar al-Nawab
