= IRAQ Builders =

IRAQ Builders is a volunteer group of doctors, pharmacists, engineers, workers, businessmen and other people from Iraqi society supporting poor families against poverty and the severity of life. The main goal of the IRAQ Builders team is to rebuild roofs of houses of widow mothers with their orphans who are unable to afford repair and maintenance for their houses. The team was founded after the major rainstorm in Baghdad in winter, 2012. It's a part of Al-Ta’awn Charity Society, which has different branches in Iraq and the Middle East.

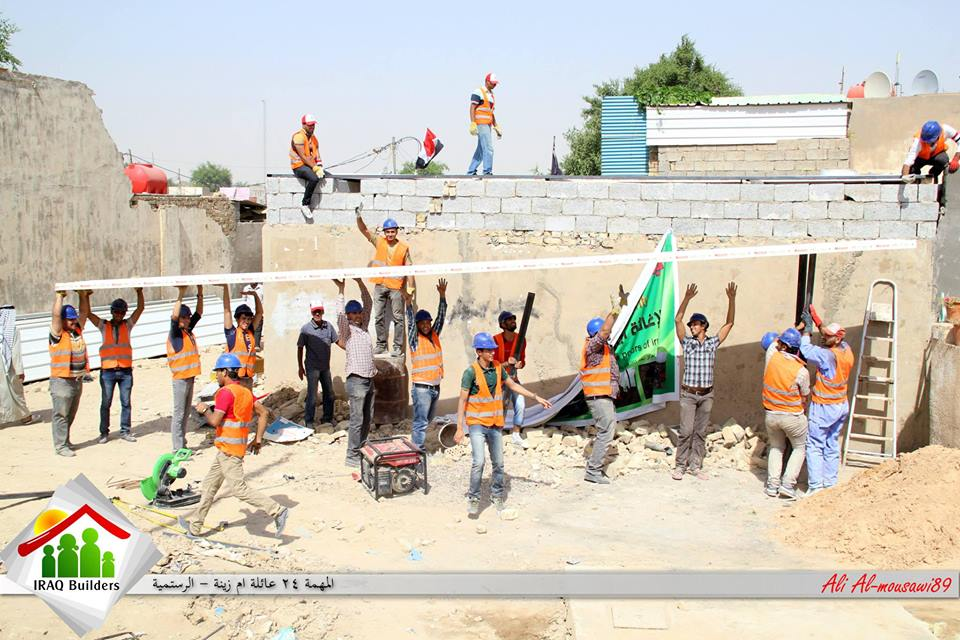
This photo shows the IRAQ Builders volunteers working together to repair Um Zeena's House, the woman who has been abandoned by her husband after a car explosion in Baghdad!

== History ==
"Ordinary people in real life with active accounts in social media networks can do heroic and huge positive changes in real life!" This idea was brought to life via IRAQ Builder's Project, which is based on using social media platforms and related mobile applications to recruit volunteers and raise donations for initiatives that lead to real positive change within communities. These initiatives mainly target marginalized groups within society such as underprivileged families, people with special needs, and women.

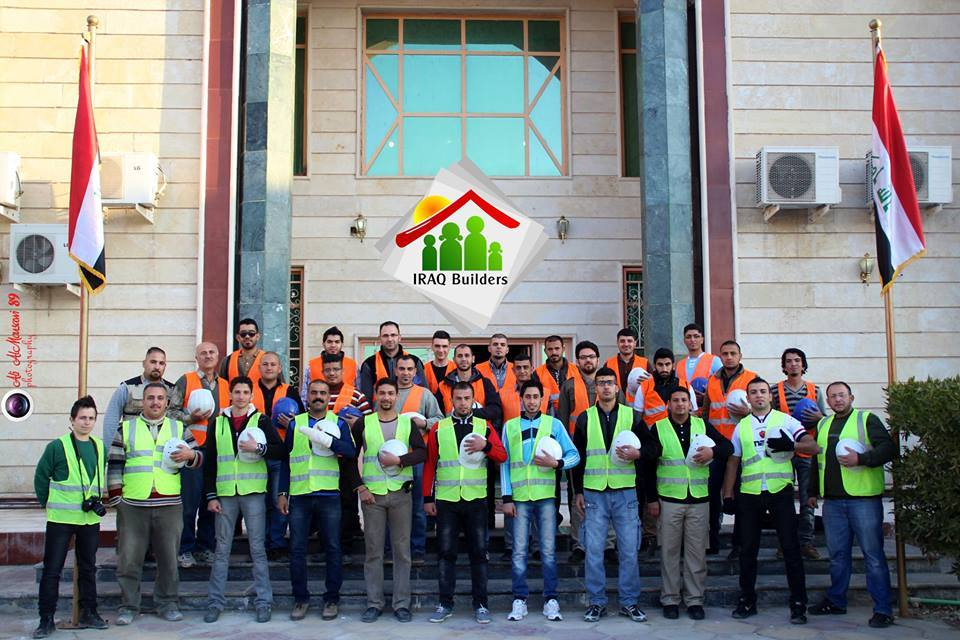
This photo shows few of the IRAQ Builders volunteers before going to a mission.

There were four volunteers when “Iraqi builders” launched in May 2013. Today, there are more than 200 members in Baghdad, as well as a dozen more in the provinces of Nasiriyah, Najaf, Maysan Governorate, Samawah and Basrah. IRAQ Builders has helped hundreds of families in Iraq until now.

== Causes ==
1. Maintenance and repair of homes for poor families in Iraq.
2. Orphan children support in Iraq.
3. Response to natural disasters in Iraq.

== Goals ==
The main goals of IRAQ Builders team are:

1. Helping underprivileged Iraqi families, especially families headed by widows and divorced women, to achieve a decent life through:
• Repair and maintenance of the homes of these families through the effort of volunteers.
• Provide jobs for people responsible for these families by providing them with an amount of money to open a business that generates enough profit to meet their basic needs.
• Provide direct support to marginalized groups via financial aid, food supplies, and healthcare services.
2. Helping orphan children obtain a normal social environment far from deprivation, and challenge the social misconception of them as poor and needy. Part of efforts is to achieve that is through several recreational activities organized by the team. For example, lunch invitations with orphans, where each volunteer brings food from his/her home to share with a group of orphans in the Association's headquarters. Another activity is organizing recreational trips and drawing contests shared between the volunteers and the orphans.
3. Spreading the spirit of volunteerism among young Iraqis by encouraging them to participate in such projects and raising their awareness of the fundamental importance of their contribution in changing our current situation in Iraq to the better.
4. Implementing good and constructive use of social networks.
5. Instilling social co-operation and patriotic spirit concepts as important steps facing challenges in our society.

== Achievements ==
1. IRAQ Builders has built new roofs for more than 90 houses in different cities in Iraq (until Sep 5th, 2015). More than 60 in Baghdad, 20 in Nasiriyah (375 km south of Baghdad), 1 in Basrah (549 km south of Baghdad), 1 in Najaf (161 km south of Baghdad), 2 in Amarah (356 km south of Baghdad) and 7 in Samawah (279 km south of Baghdad).
2. Emergency rescue mission: Water drainage after major rainstorm in Baghdad, November 20, 2013.
3. Provided free healthcare service by the Medical Team volunteers in Baghdad, December 1, 2013.
4. Second rescue mission in December 1, 2013.

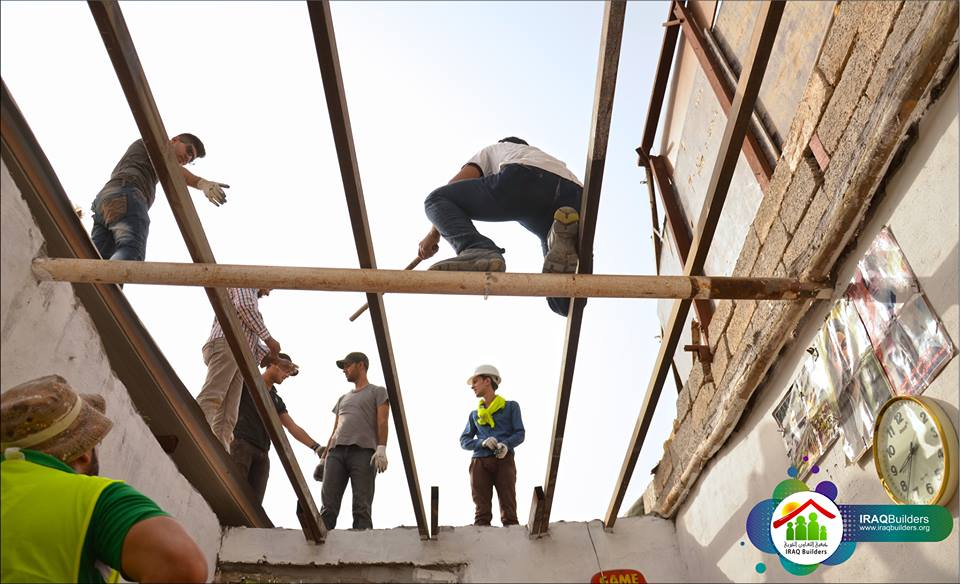
The photo shows some IRAQ Builders volunteers preparing to install a new roof for Abu Ahmed's family, who lived in a very dangerously deteriorating house, that is actually not livable to begin with. A collapsed roof with a low ground that rainwater found its way easily to flood and penetrate the house.
