= Sawa Lake =

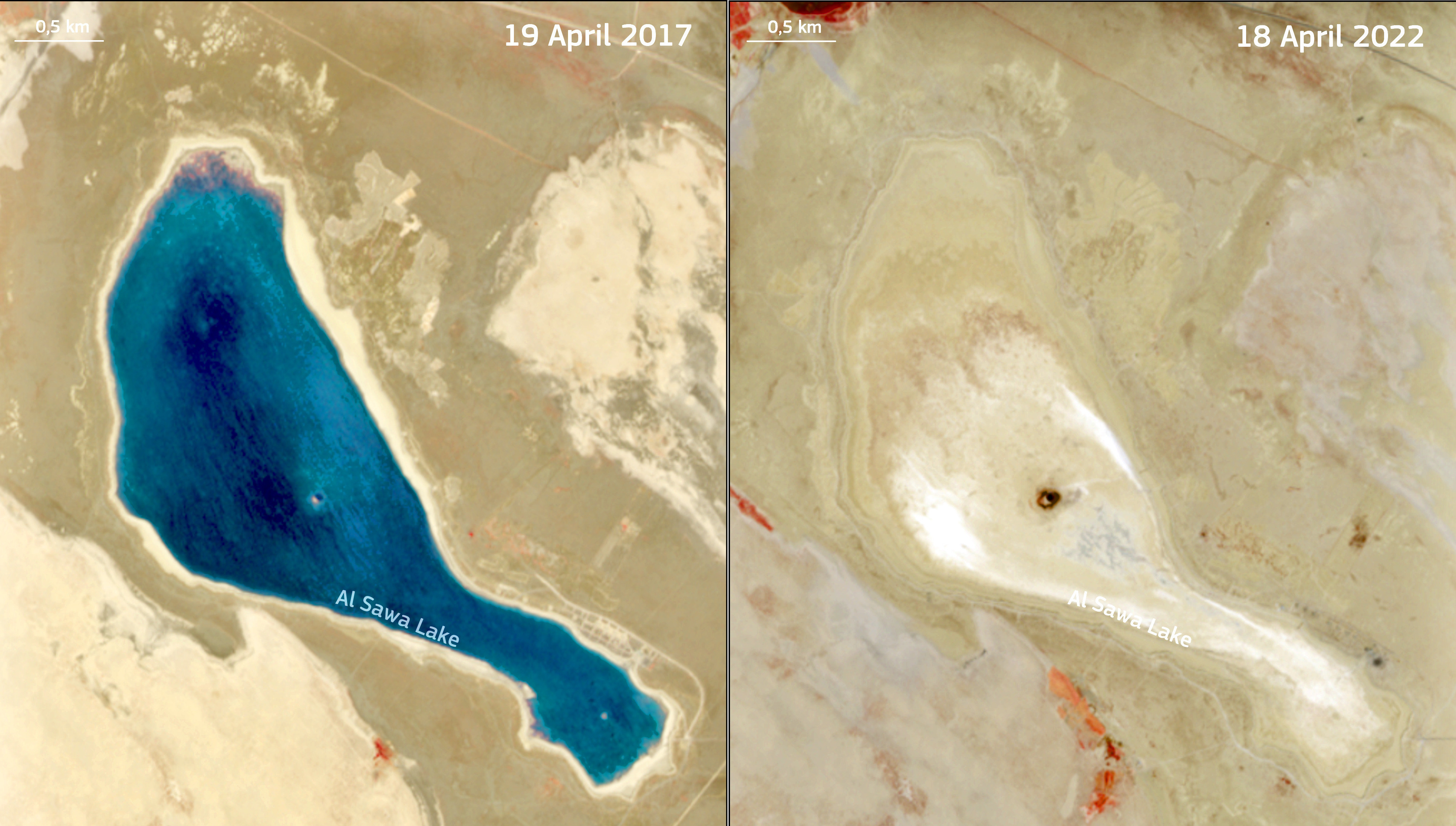
- Satellite images showing how the lake dried up in 5 years.

- Location within Iraq
- Interactive map of Sawa Lake
- Location: Muthanna Governorate, Iraq
- Coordinates: 31°18′46.3″N 44°57′36.6″E
- Lake type: Endorheic basin
- Max. length: 4.74 km (2.95 mi)
- Max. width: 1.77 km (1.10 mi)
- Surface area: 4.6 km^{2} (1.8 sq mi)

Ramsar Wetland
- Official name: Sawa Lake
- Designated: 3 March 2014
- Reference no.: 2240

Sawa Lake (Arabic: بحيرة ساوة) is an endorheic basin located in the Iraqi governorate of Muthanna near to the Euphrates River, some 23 km (14 mi) to the west of Al-Samawa city. This lake has no surface inlet or outlet, but was fed by karst groundwater (Dammam) through a big karst spring. Due to over-pumping of the Dammam aquifer the Artesian groundwater pressure was lowered and the lake dried up within 5 years and disappeared since 2023.

== Description ==
Lake Sawa was a unique body of water in Iraq characterized by elevated electric conductivity values between 30 and 40 mS/cm (up to 35 g/L as TDS). Chemical and isotope analyses revealed its meteoric origin and confirm a main feeding from the ascending groundwater from the lake bottom via joints, cracks, and fissure systems. The lake has a longitudinal shape, 4.47 km, long and 1.77 km wide. The water level of the lake is higher than the water level of the Euphrates River by 5–7 meters which flow near the lake to the east side and the Shat Al-Arab and Persian Gulf at 17–20 m asl.

Formations of gypsum surround the lake, in some cases these formations reach 6 m tall. They are formed due to the evaporation of salty water and sedimentation of salt in the shallow banks of the lake. These formations of gypsum work as a natural dams to prevent water flowing out from the lake to surrounding areas.

== Climate ==
Sawa Lake is characterized by arid climate. Highest and lowest temperatures are ranges between (27.6– 44.6) °C. Mean annual rainfall is 110 mm per year, highest values of evaporation occur during July (506 mm) while lowest values occurring in January (89 mm). Overall wind direction is a North-West with speed of 4.1 m/s.

== Flora and fauna ==
Because of its saline water, no plants grow in the lake or on its shores. Fish and algae are the most important aquatic organisms. One kind of fish lives in Sawa Lake, the Arabian toothcarp of the genus Aphanius, Cyprinodontidatae family, characterized by its soft appearance, small size (they do not exceed 10 cm), and eyes that quickly disappear after death. Also there are Pomatiopsis tryon which is Gastropoda genus and lives in brackish water from Oligocene age to recent times, particularly on the lake bottom.

Unlike its scarcity of aquatic organisms, Sawa Lake is rich with birds; 25 species of resident and immigrant birds were observed in Sawa Lake and the surrounding areas. the lake held large numbers of waterfowl, mainly ducks and coot (Fulica atra). The endemic race of little grebe (Tachybaptus ruficollis iraquensis) and the Mesopotamian crow (Corvus cornix capellanus) occur, as well as the near-endemic grey hypocolius. Locals and hunters reported the frequent occurrence of “different kinds of raptors” especially in spring and autumn, so the site may be important as a staging area.

The desert area on the western side of the lake, the fresh wetland strip (represented by the western branch of Euphrates River including the orchards), and the flat arid/semi-desert areas over the southern parts of the lake might harbor considerable wildlife diversity, mammals present include Rüppell's fox, striped hyena (near-threatened), honey badger, and Indian gray mongoose (Urva edwardsii). Reptiles found included: Water snake (maybe Natrix tessellata).

== Environmental concerns ==
As Sawa Lake represents a unique, closed water body in Iraq it is an important site to protect for its scientific, educational and biodiversity value. Only human intrusion was considered a high threat because Sawa Lake is the only water body available for the city of Samawa and its surroundings. It is a popular picnic area but this has caused a great deal of garbage accumulation everywhere around the lake. There appears to be no effort by visitors or government to manage or remove garbage from the site. Because there is no plant cover on the lake (reed beds, etc.), water birds have few places to shelter from visitors or hunters. Three threats were classified as ‘high’: urban expansion (the team was informed that the lake area was submitted for an investment project which might involve new construction around the lake); hunting, primarily represented by fishing (mainly netting) and hunting of birds, and pollution caused by the frequent visitors. Other threats (agriculture, resource extraction, transportation and service corridors, and natural systems modification) were considered ‘low’. The lake has been designated as a protected Ramsar site since 2014.

== Drying of lake ==
Since 2014, the five-square-kilometer (two-square-mile) lake has been drying up. The lake also used to be a stopover for migratory birds. In April 2022, the lake has completely dried up for the first time in thousands of years.
