= Hamza, Iraq =

Hamza Arabic: الحمزة
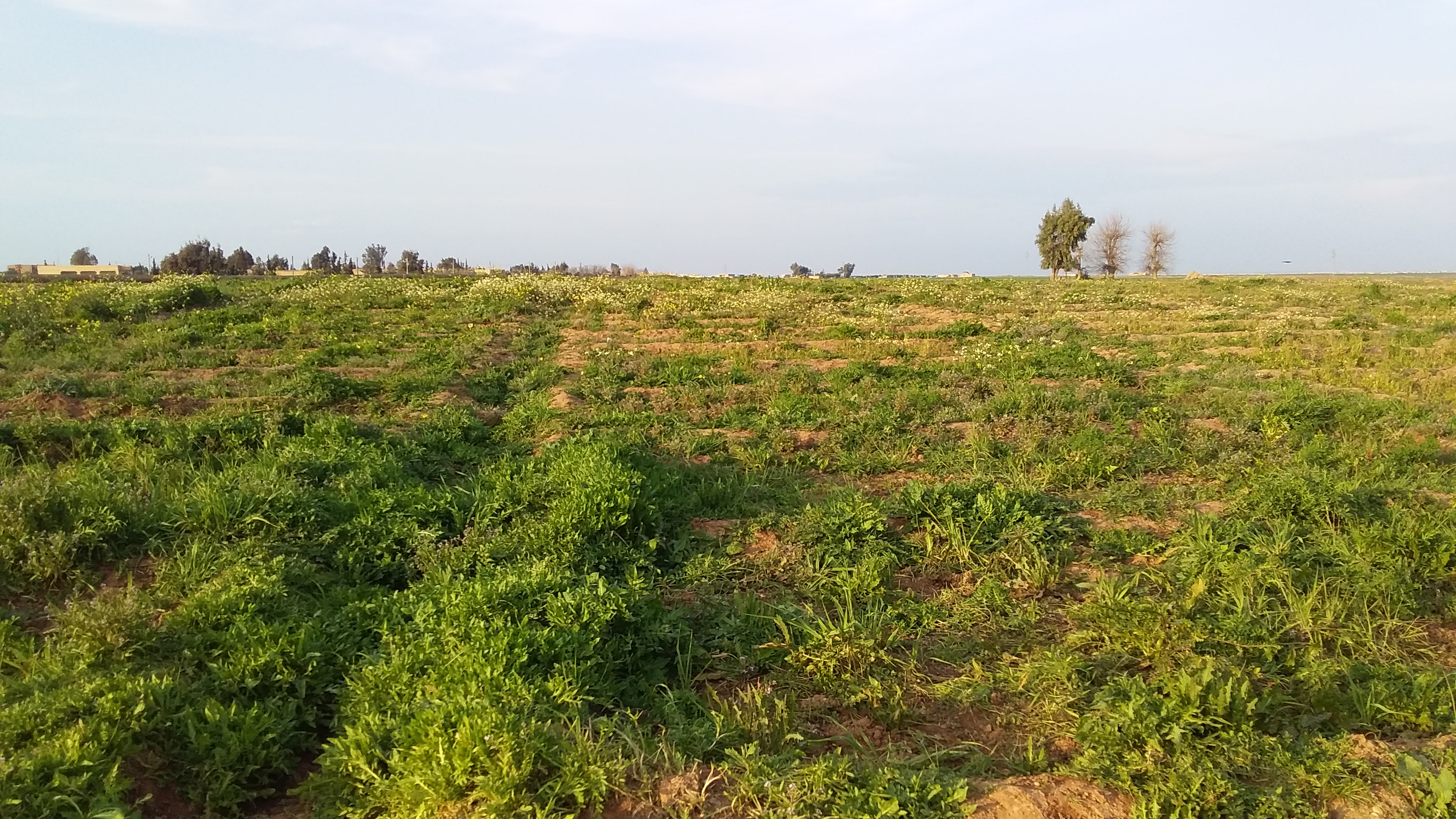

- Hamza's location inside Iraq
- Coordinates: 31.724332°N 44.976676°E
- Country: Iraq
- Governorate: Al-Qadisiyyah
- District: Hamza

Population (2015)
  - Total: 260,000
  - Summer (DST): +3
- Area code: +964

Hamza (Arabic: الحمزة) is a city in Hamza District, Al-Qādisiyyah Governorate, Iraq. It is located about 25 km south of Al Diwaniyah and 175 km south of Baghdad on the Diwaniya Channel branch of the Euphrates). Its name is attributed to Bahraini Shia cleric "Ahmad Ibn Hashim Al-Ghurifi" (a.k.a. Hamza), who was killed and buried in the region, whose shrine resides in the city. It is predominantly Shia Arab. The main tribes are Jubur, Khazali, Salameh, Aerdh, and Alakra.
