= Hadi Abbas =

Iraqi football player and coach

Hadi Abbas (هادي عباس)
Personal information
- Full name: Abdul-Hadi Abbas Al-Mahami
- Date of birth: 1915
- Place of birth: Baghdad, Baghdad Vilayet, Ottoman Iraq
- Date of death: 1990s
- Position: Forward

Senior career*
Years	Team	Apps	(Gls)
1932-1950	Al-Quwa Al-Jawiya		

Managerial career
- Nadi Al-Feili
- Iraq
- Iraq U16
- * Club domestic league appearances and goals

Abdul-Hadi Abbas Al-Mahami (1915 – 1990s) was a football player and coach.

During the 1930s and 1940s, Abbas was considered as one of the most talented left sided forwards of his generation. He played for Al-Quwa Al-Jawiya and the Iraqi army national side in a career that spanned nearly twenty years.

He scored several important goals during his playing days, including one against Syrian club Al-Barada in 1938 while guesting for the Baghdad Olympic Club and one against the Polish Army in 1943.

After retiring he turned to coaching at Nadi Al-Feili in Baghdad and in 1958 he supervised the first Iraqi junior national side made up of the brightest prospects from Baghdad areas of Al-Rasafa and Al-Karkh. The group of youngsters included the likes of Abid Kadhim, Hassan "Balah" Ali, Husham Atta Ajaj, and Latif Shandal, all of whom would go on to play for the full national side.

He also had a hand at football administration, and in 1959 he was elected president of the Iraq Football Association, which he held for three years.

In 1959 during the qualifiers for the 1960 Olympic Games in Rome, Hadi took charge of the national side for the last three matches, having been Shawqi Aboud's assistant for the first match against Lebanon.

He was one of many sportsmen who held memberships with the Iraqi Communist Party that were rounded up and imprisoned by the new Baathist government after the bloody coup of February 8, 1963. He was later released by authorities but kept himself out of the limelight until his death. At the time of ruling Hashemite monarchy, Hadi had been incarcerated at the notorious Nugra Salman Prison in Nassriya for his communist sympathies, and supervised the city's local youth team for a short spell.
