= Faleh al-Ziyadi =

Iraqi politician

Faleh al-Ziyadi فالح الزيادي

Governor of Muthanna
- Incumbent
- Assumed office 2015
- President: Fuad Masum

Personal details
- Born: Muthanna Governorate, Iraq
- Occupation: Politician

Faleh al-Ziyadi (Arabic: فالح الزيادي; ) is an Iraqi politician who has been the Governor of Muthanna since 2015.
