= Ghammas =

Ghammas Arabic: غماس
- Location within Iraq
- Coordinates: 31°44′35″N 44°37′10″E
- Country: Iraq
- Governorate: Qādisiyyah
- District: Al-Shamiya
- Established: =

Population (2014 (subdistrict total))
  - Total: 140,000
- Time zone: UTC +3

Ghammas or Al Ghammas (Arabic: غماس) is a town in Al-Shamiya District, Al-Qādisiyyah Governorate, Iraq. It is located on the Al-Shamiya branch of the Euphrates river, approximately 22 km south of district capital Al-Shamiya.
