= Samawah =

Samawah Arabic: ٱلسَّمَاوَة
- City
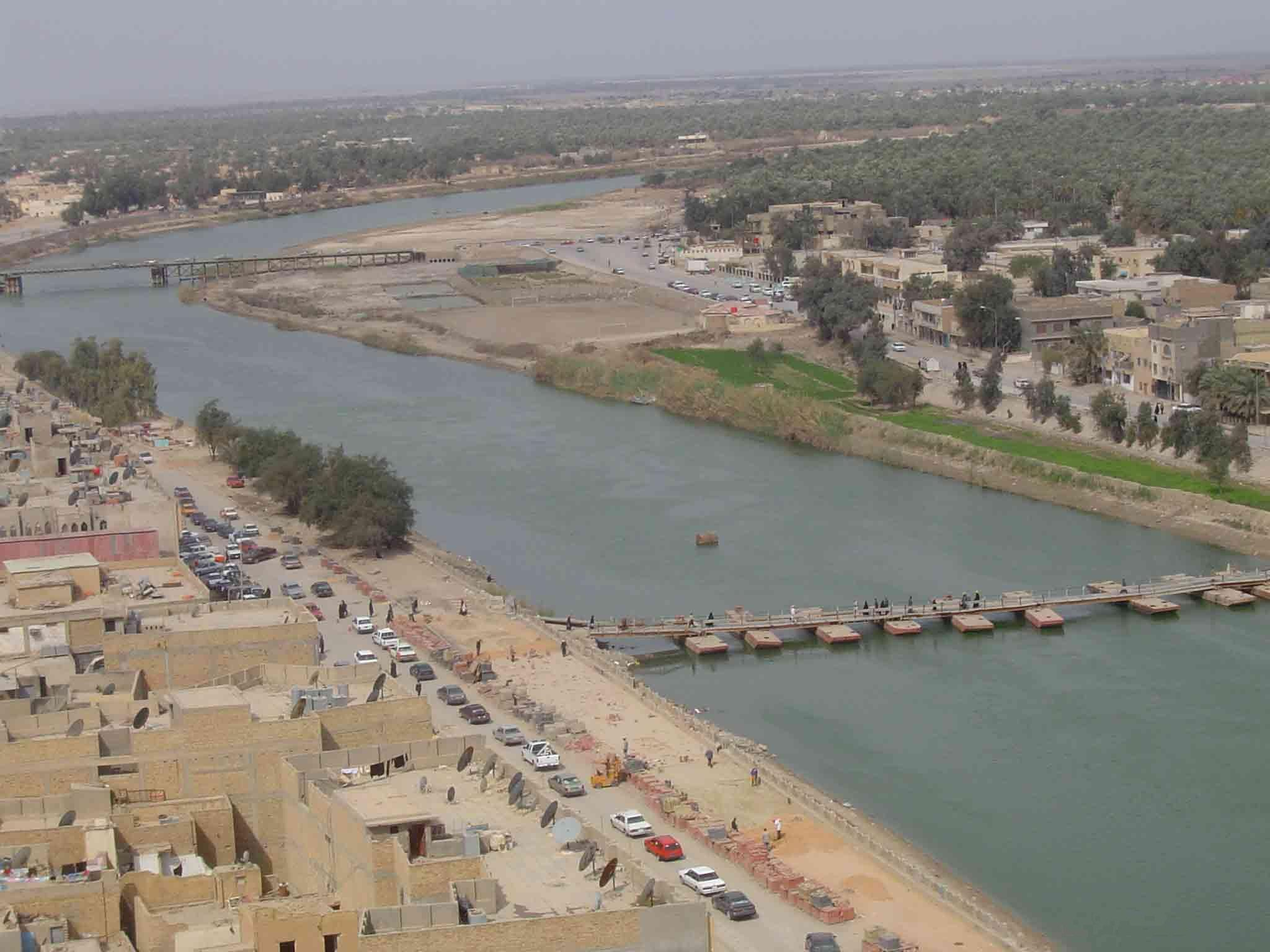
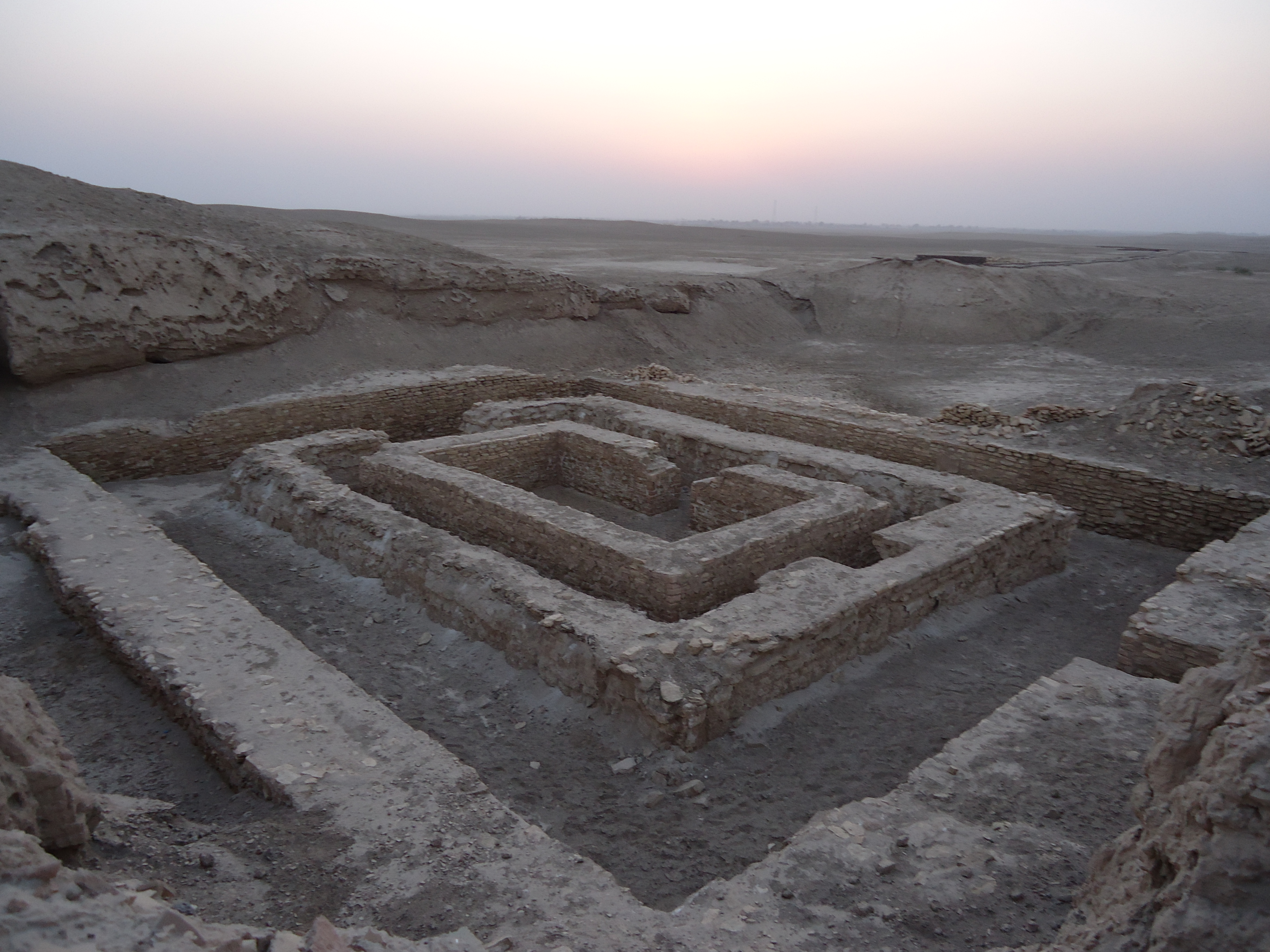
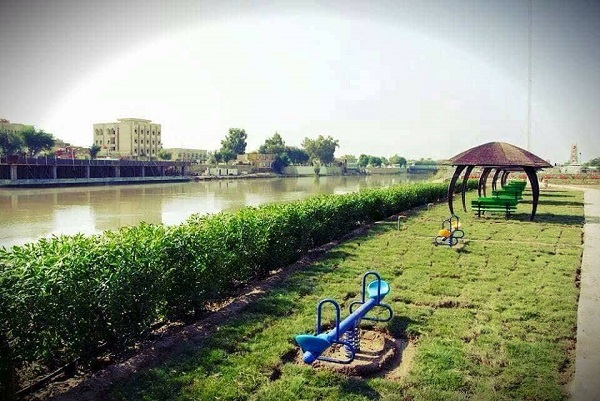
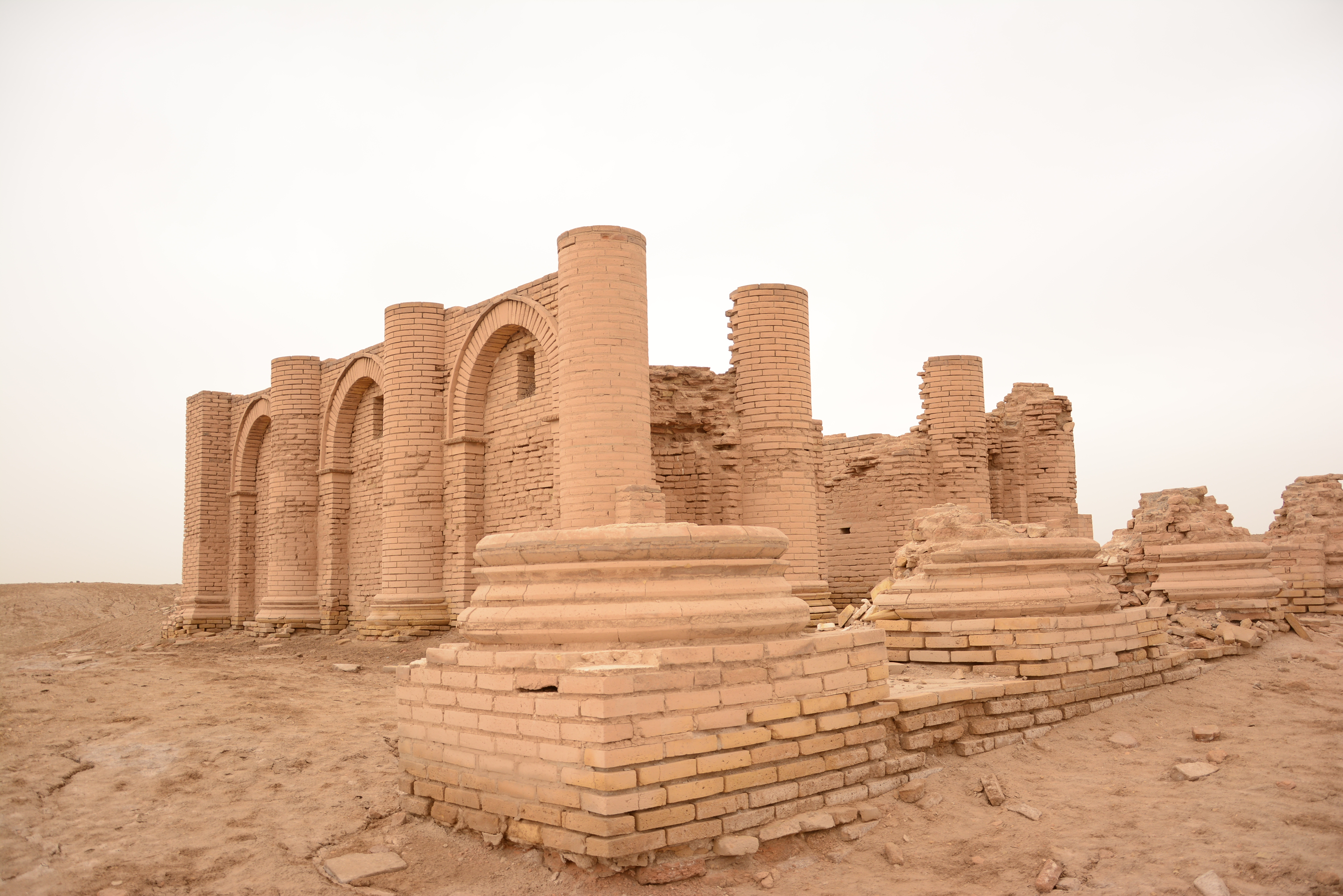
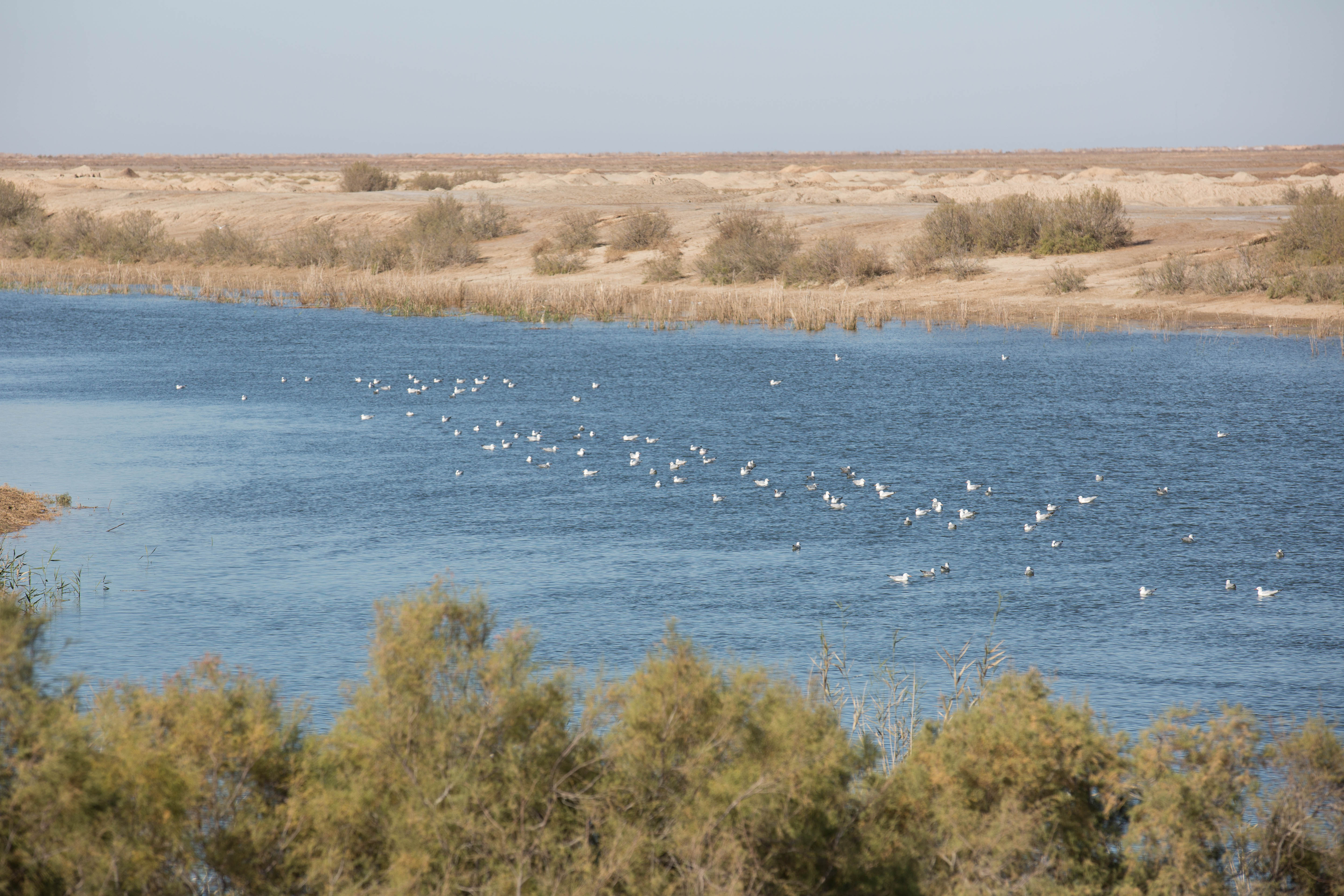
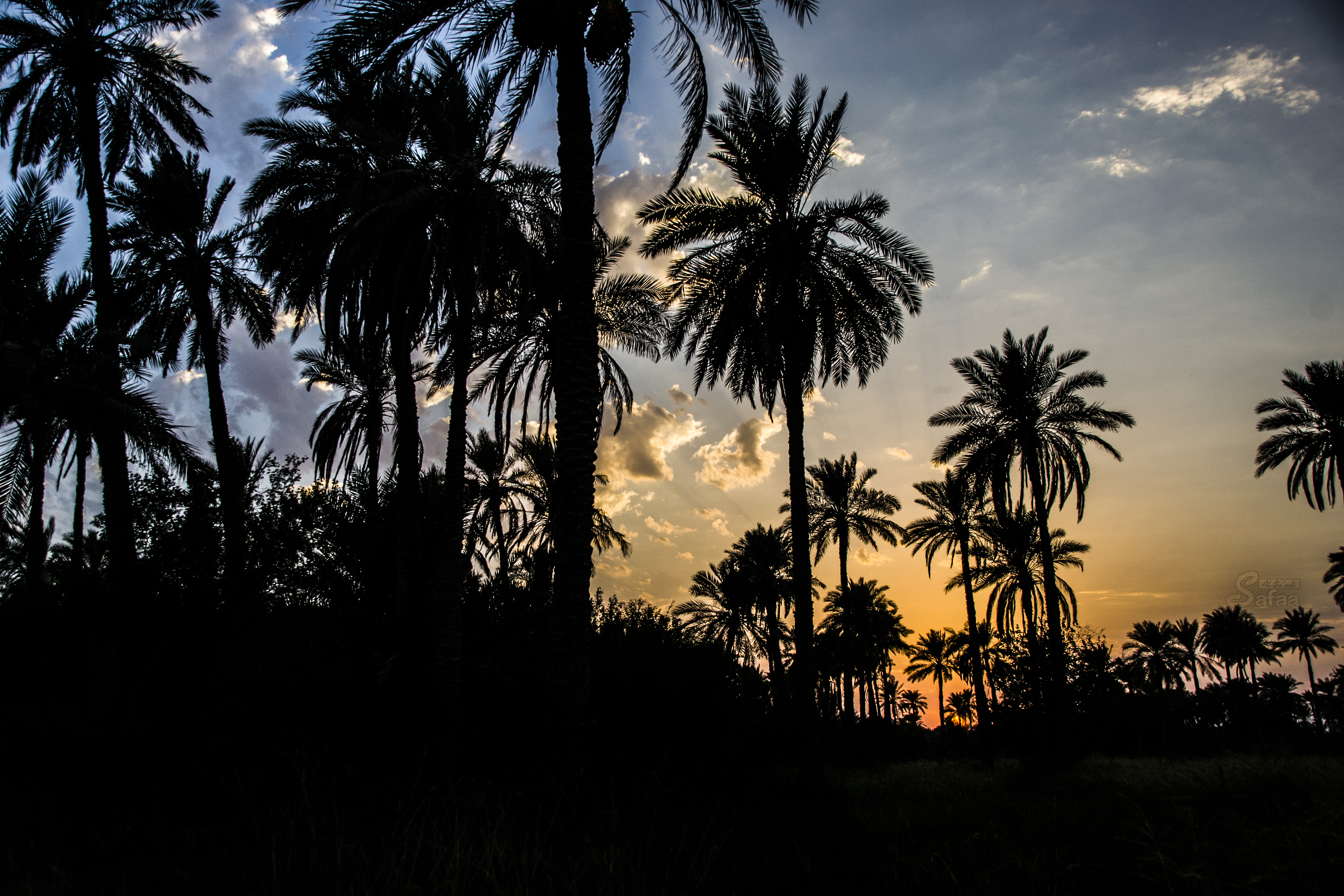
- Qaser Al Gaader Hotel in Samawah
- Nickname: Samawa
- Samawah's location inside Iraq
- Coordinates: 31°19′N 45°17′E
- Country: Iraq
- Province: Muthanna

Government
  - Mayor: Abdul Hussein Khalaf Hamza
- Elevation: 9 m (30 ft)

Population
  - Estimate (2011): 152,890
  - Rank: 20th
- Time zone: UTC+3 (Arabia Standard Time)
  - Summer (DST): No DST
- Postal code: 66001

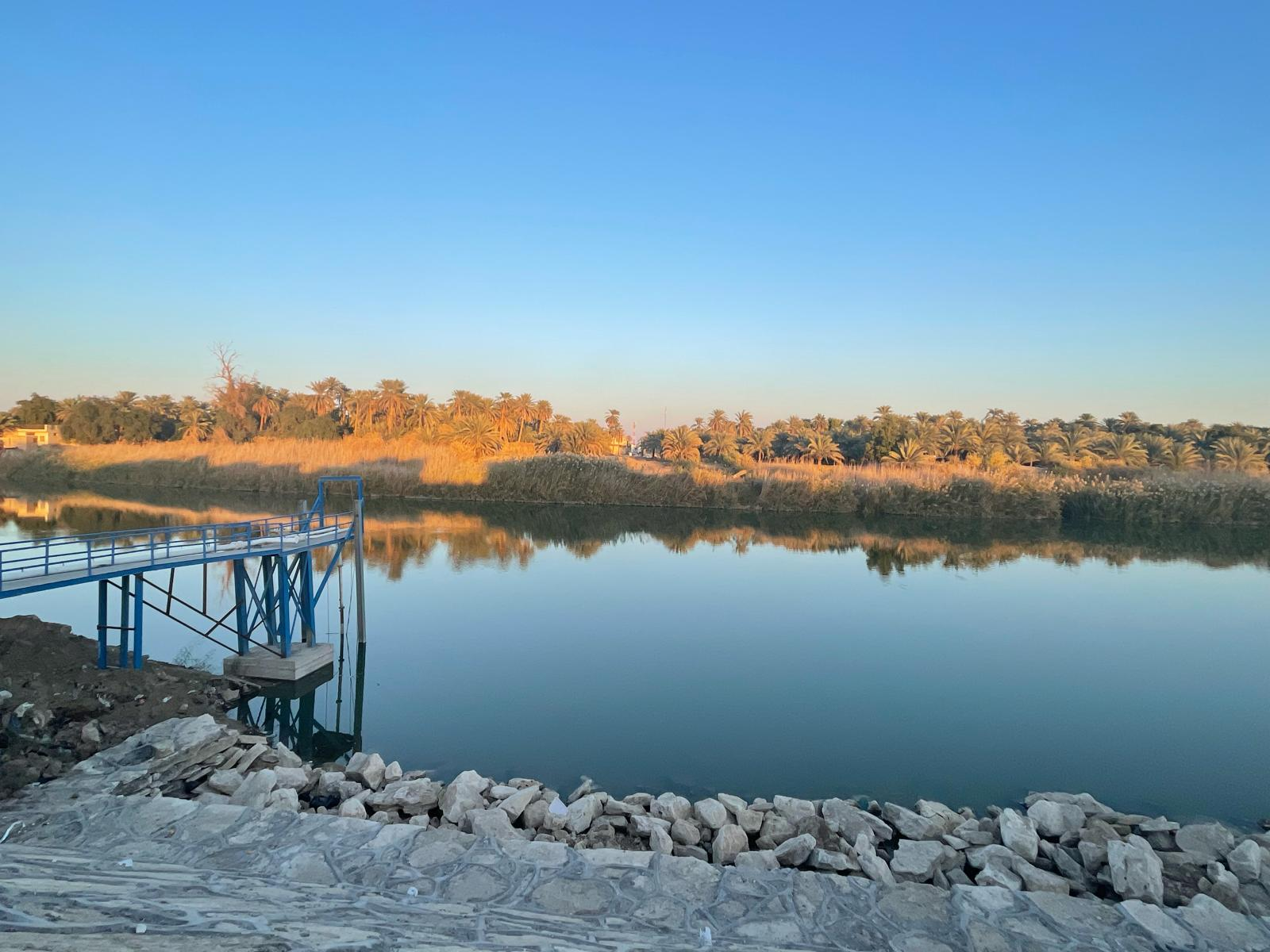
Euphrates flowing through Samawah

Samawah or As-Samawah (Arabic: ٱلسَّمَاوَة, romanized: as-Samāwah) is a city in Iraq, 280 kilometres (174 mi) southeast of Baghdad.

The city of Samawah is the modern capital of the Al Muthanna Governorate. The city is located midway between Baghdad and Basra, at the northern edge of the governorate. The province was established in 1975; prior to that date it was a unified province along with Qadissiya (Diwaniya) and Najaf.

== History and attractions ==
=== Early history ===
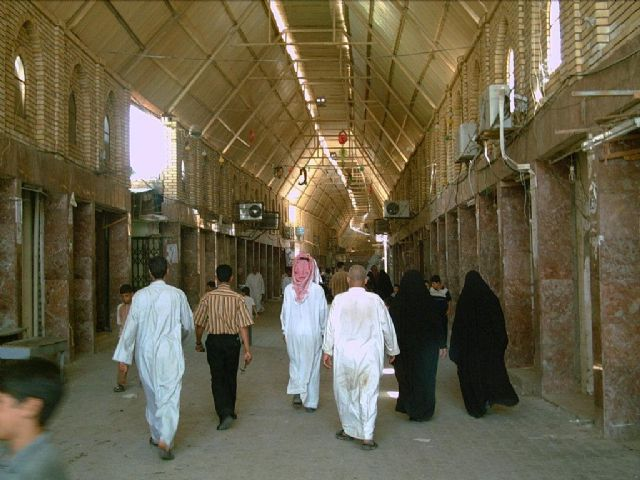
Suq Al Masgoof

The city was settled by the Arab tribe of Banu Quda'a around the 3rd century AD. It is built on both sides of the Euphrates river; there are four bridges in the centre of town for crossing between the two sides. The west bank of the city contains the commercial heart of the city, and includes the old town and the Jewish quarter, agd al yahood. The west bank is the site of the covered market Suq Al Masgoof, which dates to the Ottoman period. The area surrounding the market is the old city with its Byzantine maze of crowded markets and streets.

The most famous attraction of Samawah is the ruins of the ancient Sumerian city of Uruk which dates to 4000 BC. This was the largest city in Sumer, extending over 2 km^{2}. Uruk was not only the largest conurbation of the first urban civilisation on earth, but it is also the place where the first written script was discovered, the oldest dating back to 3300 BC.

The palm groves of Samawah

Samawah is built on both sides of the Euphrates and is surrounded by hundreds of palm groves that give it a tropical feel, especially in the southern and northern suburbs. These groves provide cool respite from the scorching heat of Mesopotamia and were the inspiration for the famous Iraqi folk song "The Palm of Samawah".

Samawah has a large salt lake called Sawa Lake, which once had a tourist village that has since fallen into disrepair. The lake is located 25 km (15 mi) to the north of the city centre and is accessible by road. The lake has no obvious source, neither river nor ancient link to a sea. The water is extremely salty due to heavy evaporation in the searing heat of Mesopotamia and supports no marine life. A unique feature of the lake is that the water is above ground level surrounded by natural levees. Due to the high levels of salt in the lake, the levees heal themselves if a break is made in the levee, stopping the water from flowing down to ground level. The salt levels also improve buoyancy, and many migratory birds walk on the lake.

=== Modern history ===
The eastern side of the city including "Qushla" has a more modern feel and contains a number of estates of apartment blocks built during the 1970s and 1980s, As Samawah Stadium, which is home to the local Muthanna football team Samawa FC, as well as technical colleges and the polytechnic. There too is Al Qushla, the historic "Ottoman Barracks".

The notorious desert prison Nigret al Salman

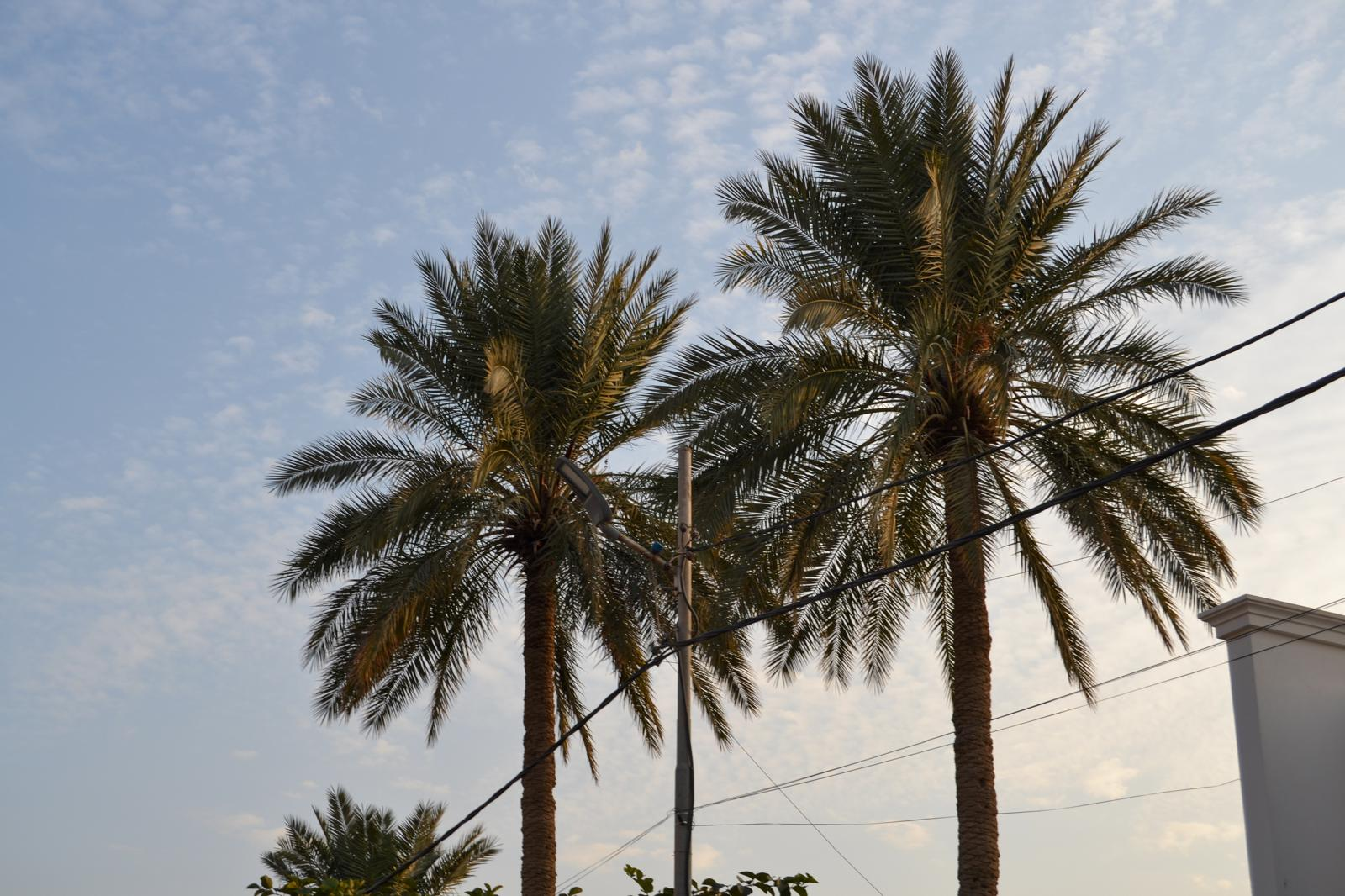
Palm Trees of Samawah

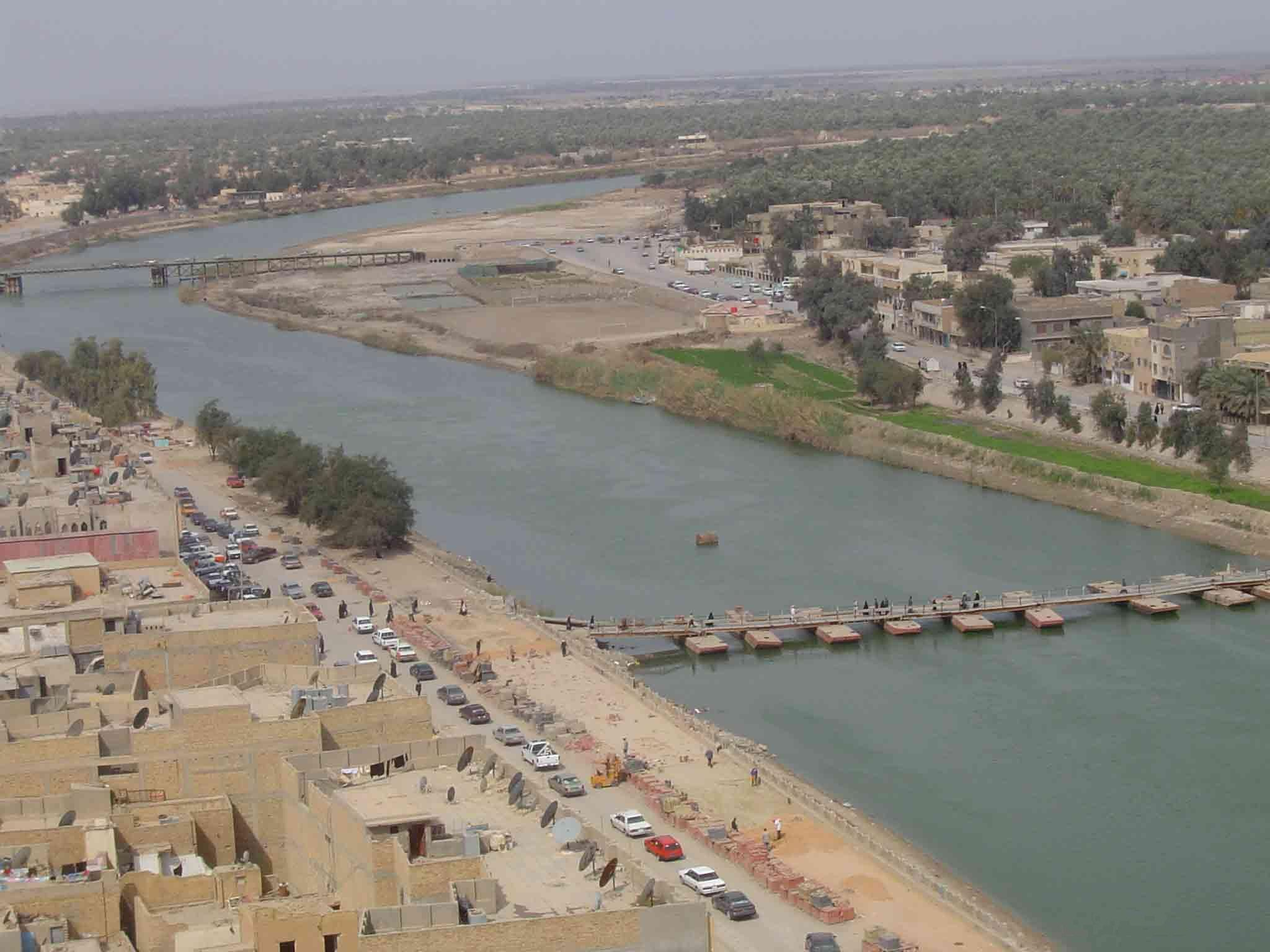
Overhead view of the river.

Al Muthanna province contains one of the most notorious prisons in Iraq, which has been used since the time of the monarchy (1921–1958). Nigret Al Salman, located in the small town of Al-Salman 200 km (124 mi) south of Samawah, is a desert prison camp built in the style of a fortress where thousands have perished over the decades. It was used to house the prisoners surviving the Dujail Massacre. During the Anfal campaign directed at Kurds, older men and women were sent to the prison as well.

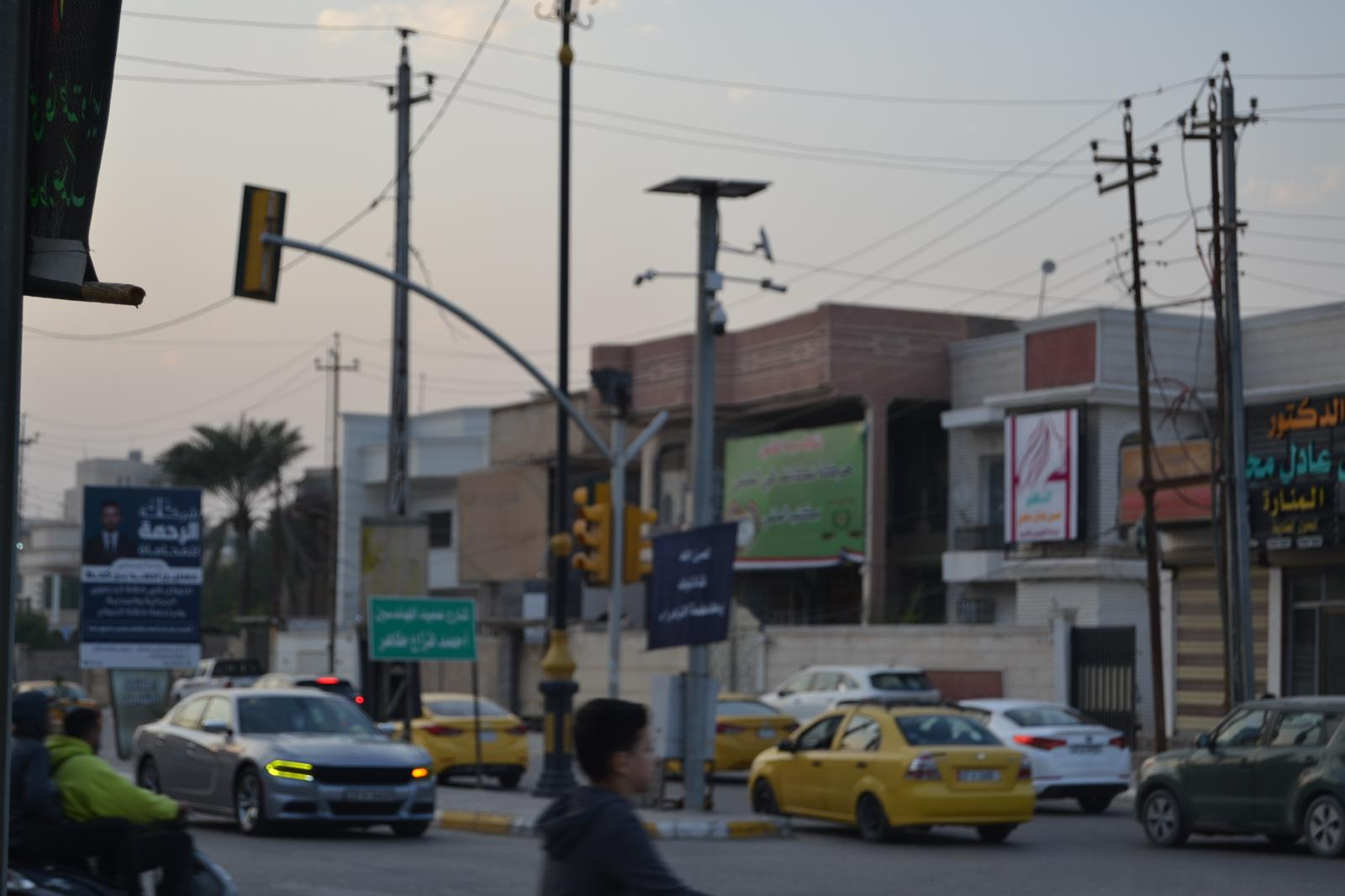
A street in Samawah

The Saray

The Saray on the east bank of Samawah is the historical seat of authority and authoritarianism in Samawah. It dates from the period of the Ottoman rule. It has been the focus of revolts and popular uprisings by the local population for the past century, most recently in 1991 when hundreds of prisoners, including women and children, as well as Kuwaiti hostages kidnapped by the Iraqi occupation forces in 1990, were freed from their captors by the people of Samawah.

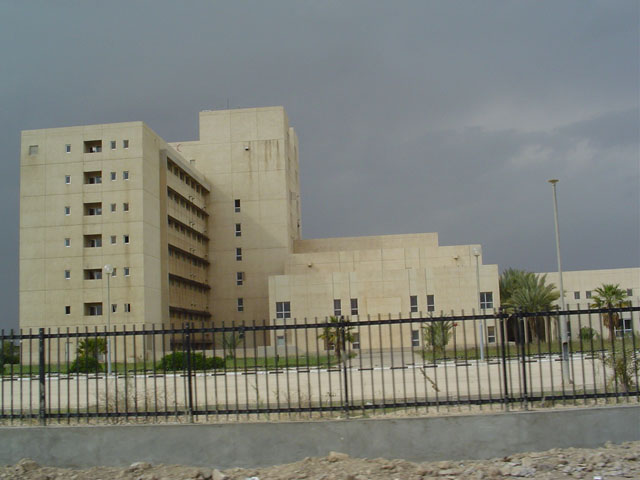
Samawah General Hospital

Samawah's medical facilities have improved greatly since 2003. The renovation of the central hospital with the aid of Japanese development funds has resulted in an improvement in medical provision for the residents of the province. New facilities, such as an MRI scanner, have been added to the existing medical units.

Wall paintings brighten up the city's drab concrete.

The residents of Samawah have used some simple and low-cost means to brighten up the appearance of the grey concrete walls surrounding official buildings and schion was started in the early 1970s, but was cut off during the period of Saddam Hussein's rule (1979–2003). The wall paintings put up since 2003 depict the new life achieved since the liberation.

=== Post-Saddam era ===
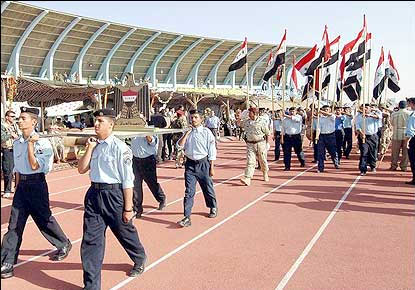
Handover ceremony for Al Muthanna province in July 2006 at the football stadium

Since the 2003 Invasion of Iraq, the town has had the fewest problems with Coalition forces, with insurgent activity practically non-existent.

Elements of the U.S. 82nd Airborne Division and 1–41 Infantry, 1st Armored Division, took the town in the Battle of Samawah, a fierce running battle with emplaced Baathist forces in the days after the initial invasion. After the initial combat phase ended in May 2003, the 82nd was relieved by U.S. Marines from RCT-5, 1st Marine Division. Control of the city was handed over to Dutch forces in August 2003, to the British Army (1st The Queen's Dragoon Guards) in October 2004 who in turn handed over to (The Light Dragoons) again British Army Cavalry Regiment in April 2005 and in October 2005 the 2nd Battalion, Parachute Regiment took over. All units took part in peacekeeping operations involving foot and vehicular patrols winning hearts and minds also they helped in training local police in crowd control and riot training, also fire arms training.

Japan Self-Defense Forces, stationed in Samawah since January 2004, left in 2006. British and Australian troops departed, making Samawah's entire province the first to be responsible for its own security, dubbed in Iraqi parlance the first "green province", meaning that it is fully independent.

On December 24, 2006, political violence between Shiite militias hit Samawah, killing 9 people, among them 4 policemen. Reportedly, local members of the Mahdi Army tried to seize the city in a failed attempt and clashed with the police, who were aided by the Badr Organization. Internal fighting and division among the local tribes was reported. Associates of Mahdi leader Muqtada al-Sadr said he was distancing himself from the Samawah militia, led by "a renegade cleric".

On May 1, 2016, a government office and bus station in the city of Samawah were attacked in a double car bombing claimed by the Islamic State. The attack killed at least 32 people and wounded another 85.

== Geography ==
=== Climate ===
Samawah has a hot desert climate (BWh) in the Köppen–Geiger climate classification system. Most rain falls in the winter. The average annual temperature in Samawah is 23.8 °C (74.8 °F). About 106 mm (4.17 in) of precipitation falls annually.

Climate data for Samawah
Month	Jan	Feb	Mar	Apr	May	Jun	Jul	Aug	Sep	Oct	Nov	Dec	Year
Mean daily maximum °C (°F)	15.1 (59.2)	18.6 (65.5)	24.6 (76.3)	31.0 (87.8)	37.8 (100.0)	41.7 (107.1)	43.4 (110.1)	43.7 (110.7)	41.4 (106.5)	34.6 (94.3)	25.6 (78.1)	18.3 (64.9)	31.3 (88.4)
Mean daily minimum °C (°F)	5.0 (41.0)	7.3 (45.1)	11.2 (52.2)	16.1 (61.0)	21.7 (71.1)	24.8 (76.6)	26.0 (78.8)	25.5 (77.9)	22.9 (73.2)	17.1 (62.8)	10.9 (51.6)	6.9 (44.4)	16.3 (61.3)
Average precipitation mm (inches)	18 (0.7)	18 (0.7)	9 (0.4)	10 (0.4)	5 (0.2)	0 (0)	0 (0)	0 (0)	0 (0)	3 (0.1)	19 (0.7)	24 (0.9)	106 (4.2)
Source: climate-data.org

== Religion ==
Primarily Shiite, the town was cut off almost entirely by Saddam Hussein during the 1991 Iraqi uprisings after the Gulf War. The terrorisation of the Jewish minority by Arab nationalists in the 1940s and '50s drove most of them into exile. The Torat Synagogue, which has been abandoned since the flight of the Jews, still exists in the qushla quarter of the east bank of Samawah. In 1979–81 an ethnic cleansing campaign saw Shia Iraqis deemed to be of Persian origin deported by the Baathist regime of Saddam Hussein.

Today, there is still a small population of Sunnis in the city.

== Economy ==
The unemployment rate is high. The city, in spite of the lack of high-value natural resources such as oil and gas and a lack of central government investment, has managed to maintain lively small-scale industrial, agricultural and alternative sectors.

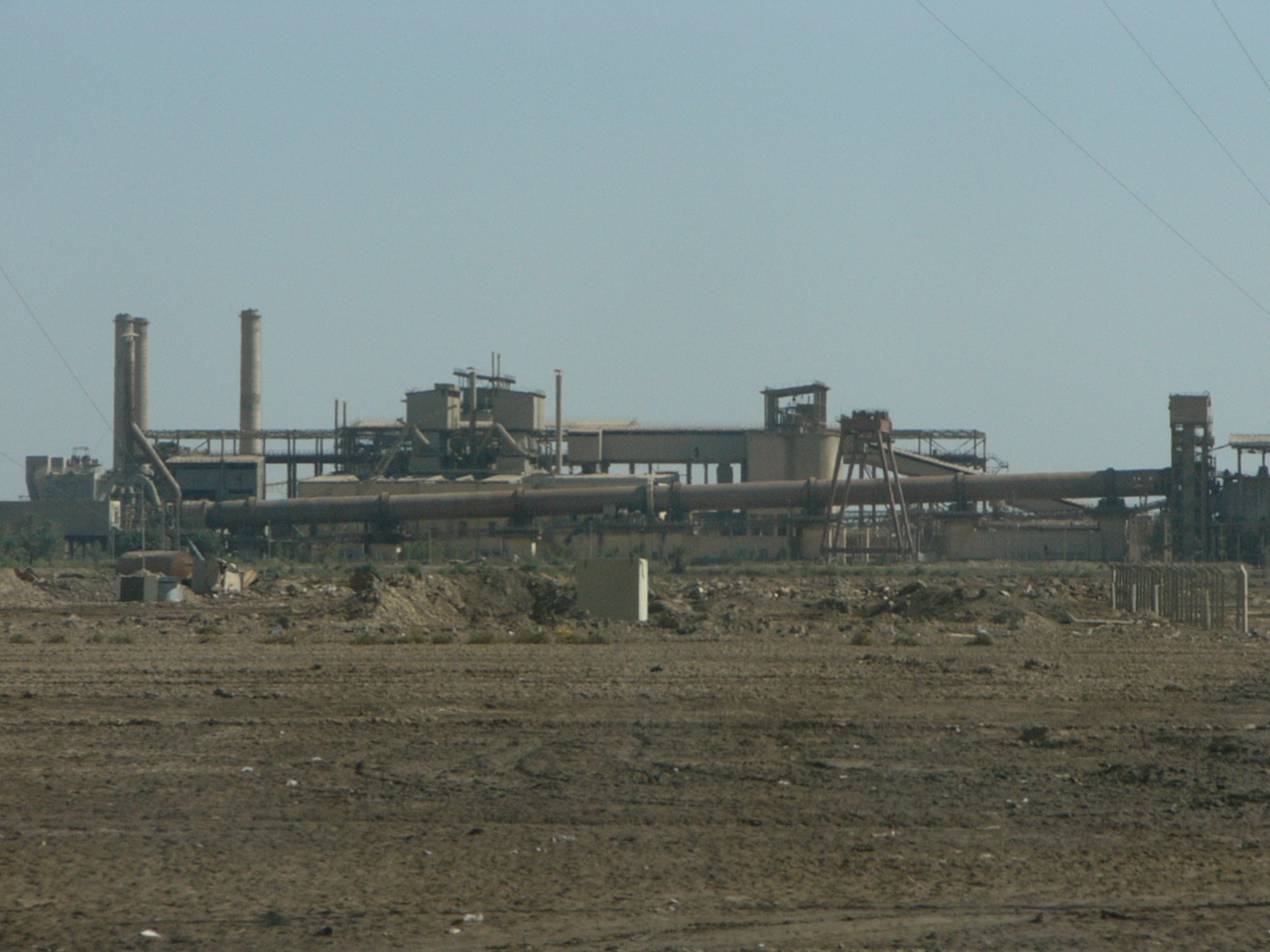
The southern cement factory in central Samawah

Samawah had the largest cement factories in the Middle East during the 1970s, with a total production capacity of 2.85 million tonnes a year. These have since fallen into disrepair, exacerbating the unemployment situation, although the southern cement factory, the oldest, reopened in 2005. As of 2007, the four existing plants are producing a total of just 0.8 million tonnes a year due to the shortage of electricity. Five new cement factories with a capacity of 9 million tonnes a year are under construction on the outskirts of Samawah and will provide employment for several thousand skilled and unskilled workers as well as filling 45% of Iraq's total cement needs.

A small oil refinery was reopened in Samawah in 2005 after being idle for 15 years. The existing 10,000 bbl/d facility's capacity was doubled to 20,000 bbl/d (3,200 m^{3}/d) in 2006 and was to have increased to 30,000 bbl/d (4,800 m^{3}/d) by 2007. The facility is linked by pipeline to the new Kifl oil field in Samawah province that has an initial capacity of 40,000 bbl/d (6,400 m^{3}/d). The major advantage of the refinery is that it is designed for processing heavy crude oil, allowing the light crude to be exported.

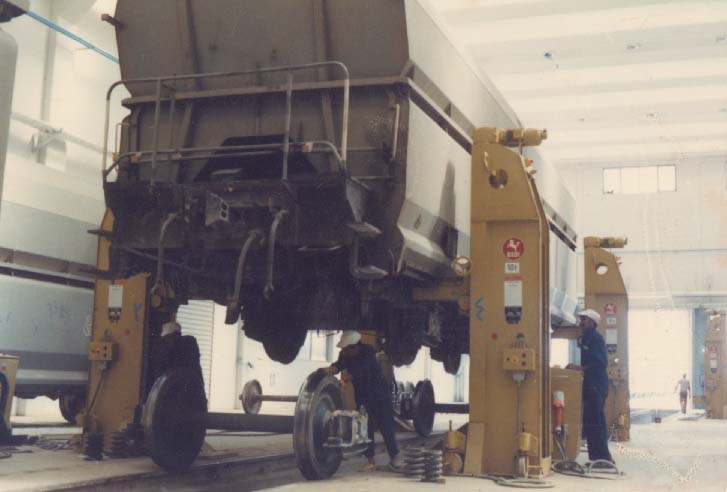
Railway overhaul facility

The historical route between Mesopotamia and Saudi Arabia ran through Samawah, and it has been a main trading thoroughfare for Iraqi produce to Saudi Arabia.

Samawah is home to a rail yard for overhauling and maintaining the rolling stock and locomotives along the Baghdad-Basra rail routes. Samawah railway station is conveniently located halfway between Baghdad and Basra. Overhaul facilities for the railways are an important source of employment opportunities in this Mesopotamian city. There was an overhaul facility for the Iraqi Armoured corps based in Samawah belonging to the military Industrial Commission.

In terms of agriculture, the staple Mesopotamian produce is grown in Samawah, such as dates, wheat, barley, citrus fruits, and tomatoes. In addition, Samawah is home to the small and rare trade in wild truffles, which grow in the desert regions of Muthanna province.

The Bahr al Milh, or Salt Sea, located 20 km (12 mi) to the southwest of Samawah, is the main source of industrial salts in Iraq, and large salt mining and processing facilities are located there to exploit this resource. A thriving industry in traditional sun-baked brick manufacture exists on the outskirts of Samawah using primarily female labourers for forming and drying bricks. Large temporary kilns with chimney stacks as high as 30 m (98 ft) are constructed by villagers in the surrounding region to make baked bricks with the same methods used during the Sumerian and Akkadian periods.

Samawah has its own media industry, with the recently reopened Muthanna TV broadcasting terrestrial transmission to Samawah and the province. It focuses primarily on local news and issues. The station gained notoriety as the "Robin Hood of Television" when it broadcast the 2006 World Cup games without licence using a single subscription to a pay-per-view satellite channel. The central government were unable to enforce a ruling against the TV station to stop the transmissions.

There is a small cottage industry of carpet makers in the city, primarily employing women. The advantages for the local carpet makers are the availability of cheap raw materials, wool from the desert Bedu who use Samawah as their main trading post, and the availability of cheap labour in this poor city.

== Reaching Samawah ==
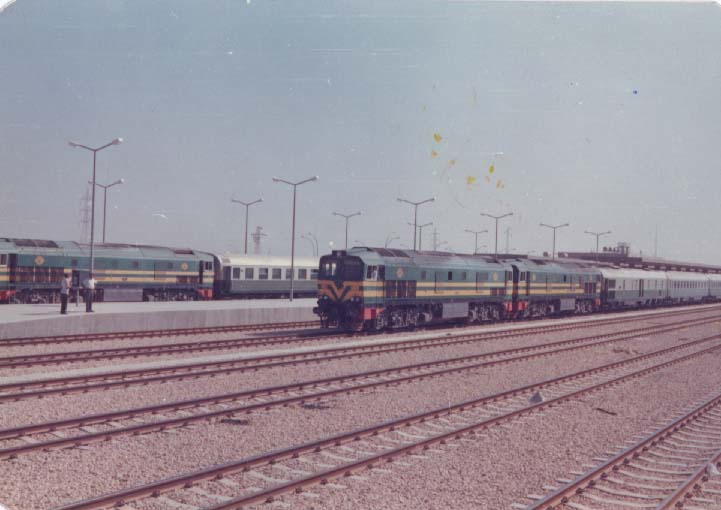
Samawah railway station

Samawah is served by a highway for road traffic from Baghdad and Basra. The railway station has passenger services from both Baghdad and Basra and is the cheapest form of transport. The railway station is located approximately 4 kilometers (2.5 mi) to the west of central Samawah.

Samawah is also accessible via the Euphrates River.

== Samawah artists and personalities ==
A number of prominent artists originate from Samawah, including poets, painters and sculptors. An indepth overview of both historical and current artists can be found in samawah artists.

Due to the preponderance of both communists as well as Shia thinkers like (Sheikh Mahdi Al-Samawi) was among the personalities and artists of Samawah, most of them ended up either being killed by the Baathists regime or lived in exile for much of their lives.

== See also ==
- Japanese Iraq Reconstruction and Support Group
- List of places in Iraq
- Iraqi conflict (2003–present)
