= Hamza District =

District of the Al-Qādisiyyah Governorate in Iraq

Hamza District Arabic: قضاء الحمزة
- District
- Interactive map of Hamza District
- Country: Iraq
- Governorates: Al-Qādisiyyah
- Seat: Hamza

Population (2015)
  - Total: 164,998
- Time zone: UTC+3 (AST)

Hamza District (Arabic: قضاء الحمزة) is a district of the Al-Qādisiyyah Governorate, Iraq, nearly 200km south of Baghdad. Its seat is the city Hamza.
