= Al-Salman District =

Al-Salman District قضاء السلمان
- District
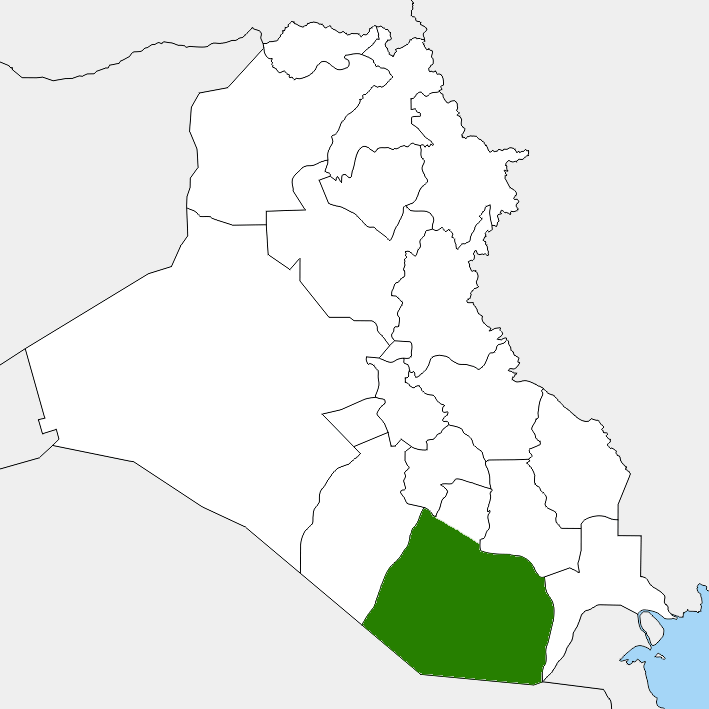
- Map of Al-Salman District in Iraq
- Coordinates: 30.5°N 44.53333°E
- Country: Iraq
- Governorates: Al Muthanna Governorate

Area
  - Total: 46,928 km^{2} (18,119 sq mi)
  - Rank: 2 (in Iraq)

Population (2024)
  - Total: 10,608
- Time zone: UTC+3 (AST)

Al-Salman District (Arabic: قضاء السلمان) is a district of the Al Muthanna Governorate, Iraq. Its population in 2010 was 9,324.
