= Muthaffar al-Nawab =

Iraqi poet and political critic (1934–2022)

Muzaffar al-Nawwab
- Born: Muzaffar Abd al-Majid al-Nawwab; 1 January 1934; Baghdad, Iraq
- Died: 20 May 2022 (aged 88); University Hospital Sharjah, Sharjah, United Arab Emirates
- Occupations: Poet, Politician
- Parent: Abdul Majid al-Nawwab (father)

Muthaffar al-Nawab or Muzaffar al-Nawwab (Arabic: مظفر عبد المجيد النواب; 1 January 1934 – 20 May 2022) was an Iraqi poet and political critic.

== Life and career ==
Al-Nawwab was born in Baghdad, Iraq, in 1934 into an aristocratic Shi'ite family of Indian origin that appreciated art, poetry and music. He showed a talent for poetry from an early age. He completed his undergraduate studies at the University of Baghdad and became a teacher but was expelled for political reasons in 1955 and remained unemployed for three years, at a difficult time for his family who was suffering financial hardship.

He joined the Iraqi Communist Party while still at college and was tortured by the Hashemite Government. After the Iraqi revolution in 1958 which overthrew the monarchy, he was appointed an inspector at the Ministry of Education. In 1963 he was forced to leave Iraq to neighbouring Iran, after the intensification of competition between the nationalists and the communists who were exposed to prosecution and strict observation by the ruling regime. He was arrested and tortured by the Iranian secret police, before being forcibly repatriated to the Iraqi government. An Iraqi court handed down a death sentence against him for one of his poems, later commuted to life imprisonment and he was sent to Nugra Salman Prison. He escaped prison by digging a tunnel and fled to the marshlands, where he joined a communist faction that sought to overthrow the government.

Known for his powerful revolutionary poems and scathing invectives against Arab dictators, he lived in exile in many countries, including Syria, Egypt, Lebanon and Eritrea, where he stayed with the Eritrean rebels, before returning to Iraq in 2011. Before he returned to Iraq, he had been essentially stateless being able to travel only on Libyan travel documents. The first complete Arabic language edition of his works was published in London in 1996 by "Dar Qanbar" He died on 20 May 2022 in the University Hospital Sharjah in the UAE.

== Work ==
He is often known as the "revolutionary poet". His poetry is replete with Arab and international revolutionary symbols. He used his work to incite public emotions against repressive regimes, political corruption and injustice. His language was harsh, with occasional use of profanity. His earliest writing employed the southern Iraq dialect because he believed that the region was more revolutionary. However, the use of that particular dialect failed to garner a mass audience, and he eventually switched to classical language in his later works.

== See also ==
- Iraqi art
- List of Iraqi artists
