= Al-Qadisiyyah (historical city) =

Historical city in Iraq

Coordinates: 31°45′N 44°08′E

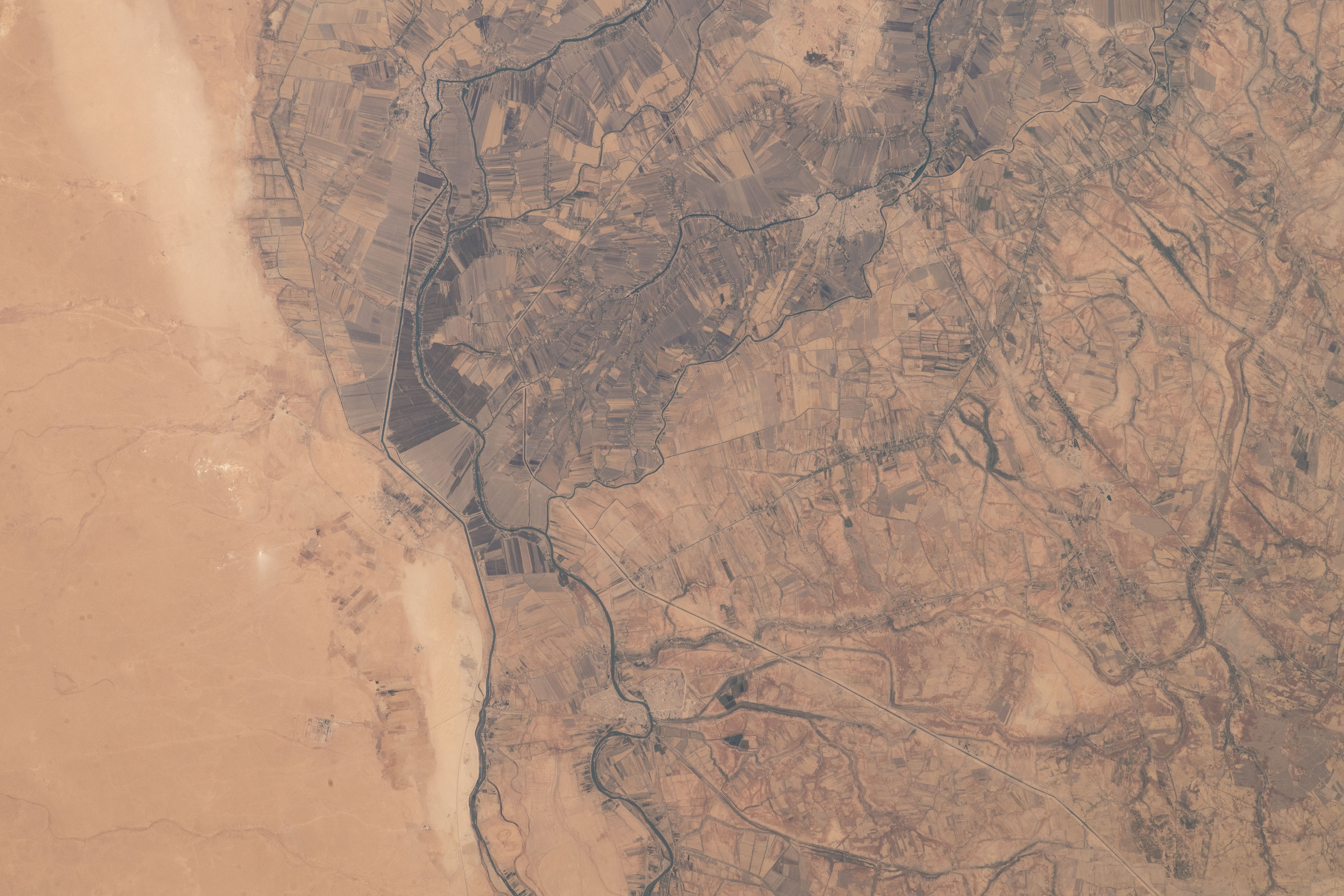
(Seen from above) Al-Qadisiyah near the desert, the Euphrates and the Qadisiyah River, with nearby towns Ghammas and Ash-Shinafiyah

Al-Qādisiyyah (Arabic: القادسية) is a historical city in southern Mesopotamia, southwest of al-Hillah and al-Kūfah in Iraq. It is most famous as the site of the Battle of al-Qādisiyyah in c. 636, in which an Arab Muslim army defeated a larger Sasanian army.

== Commercial importance ==
Prior to the Arab conquest, al-Qādisiyyah was but a small village on the western side of the Euphrates River, near an old castle at `Udhayb, and was possibly part of the Wall of the Arabs. However, during the centuries that followed, al-Qādisiyyah grew in size and importance and was a noted stop along very important highways of commerce that led to Baghdad and Mecca.

== History ==
Al-Qādisiyyah was the scene of a decisive battle in the conquest of Persia by the Arabs around 636. The Muslim troops of the caliph `Omar led by Sa`d ibn Abī Waqqās despite their outnumbered forces defeated the army of the Sassanid emperor Yazdgard III, led by Rostam Farrokhzād. The battle of Al-Qādisiyyah would later be depicted in a manuscript of Shahnameh, a national epic authored by the Persian poet Ferdowsi.

== Another historical Qādisiyyah ==
Another Qādisiyyah existed on the Tigris River, off the road between Baghdad and Samarra, not very far from the Euphrates city. Both cities are recorded in the geographies of Ibn Khordadbeh.
