= Suq Al Masgoof =

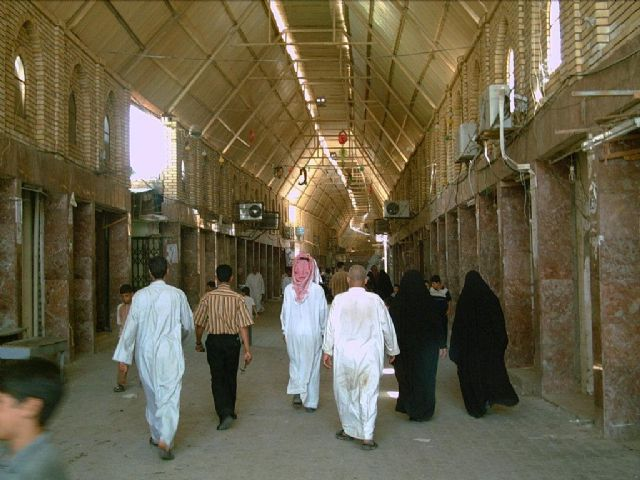
Suq Al Masgouf market in Central Samawah

Suq Al Masgouf is an indoor market place in the centre of the city of Samawah in southern Iraq. Dating back to the Ottoman period, the area surrounding the Suq Al Masgouf is the old Byzantine city of other crowded markets and streets.
