= Diwaniya District =

Diwaniya District Arabic: قضاء الديوانية
- District
- Interactive map of Diwaniya District
- Country: Iraq
- Governorate: Qadisiyyah
- Seat: Al Diwaniyah

Population 2024
  - Total: 481,773
- Time zone: UTC+3 (AST)

Diwaniya District (Arabic: قضاء الديوانية) is a district in Al-Qadisiyyah Governorate, southern Iraq. It is home to Al Diwaniya city the capital of Al-Qadisiyyah Governorate in Iraq.
