= Hilla Sheriff =

American physician (1903–1988)

- Born: 1903; Easley, SC
- Died: September 10, 1988 (aged 84–85); Columbia, SC (laid to rest in Greenlawn Memorial Park)
- Education: Pre-Med at College of Charleston 1926: Medical Degree at the Medical College of the State of South Carolina 1937: Masters Degree from Harvard University
- Occupation(s): Health Officer In Spartanburg County Director of the Board of Health’s Division of Maternal and Child Health in Columbia, South Carolina Deputy Commissioner of the South Carolina Department of Health and Environmental Control Chief of the Bureau of Community Health Services

Dr. Hilla Sheriff (1903 – September 10, 1988) was a South Carolina physician whose positions included being a Health Officer in Spartanburg County and being the Director of the Board of Health's Division of Maternal and Child Health in Columbia, South Carolina. Gender barriers were present in the South at this time which she navigated through in her practice. She became one of the most respected medical officials in the twentieth century. She devoted much of her life to eradicating diseases, such as pellagra and diphtheria, which plagued the poor and marginalized communities of South Carolina. During her career, she also made improvements to contraception, maternity care, and family planning practices.

== Early life ==
Sheriff was born into a well-to-do South Carolina family and was the fifth child of seven. Her father, John Washington Sheriff, was a retail lumberman, and her mother a woman of “medical and educational philanthropy.”

From a young age, she envisioned becoming a doctor, taking on this role when caring for her family's chickens, and playing with her dolls. She faced some doubt with the idea of studying medicine from her parents, as they thought it a “childish fantasy.” However, this did not keep her from attending the College of Charleston for two years before transferring to the Medical College of the State of South Carolina where she received her M.D. in 1926. Then, she interned at the Hospital of the Women's Medical College of Pennsylvania and completed her residencies at the Children's Hospital in Washington, DC, and the Willard Parker Contagious Disease Hospital in New York.

== Career ==
=== Early career ===
She returned to Spartanburg, South Carolina in 1929 where she struggled to open a pediatrics practice for 2 years. Sheriff then received an invitation from the American Women's Hospitals Service to direct a unit in the Piedmont area of South Carolina, marking the beginning of her career in public health. As the Depression set in, Pellagra, a deficiency disease characterized by diarrhea, dermatitis, dementia, and death, hit the poor Piedmont mill villages of South Carolina. During this time, Sheriff focused on her efforts on eliminating this disease and providing aid to working mothers through a “healthmobile,” a mobile clinic where she demonstrated healthy cooking practices, instructed women how to properly can fruits and vegetables, and examined the sick. This endeavor was highly successful, as Spartanburg saw a 50% reduction in pellagra from 1931 to 1933. Next, Sheriff opened four health clinics with assistance from the American Women's Hospital units she was in charge of. They provided assistance to mothers and infants and trained “health aids,” who took their skills out into the rural communities.

=== Late career ===
In 1933, Sheriff was selected as the assistant director of the Spartanburg County, South Carolina Health Department. She became the director four years later. Spartanburg County Health Department was the most active health department during the time she was in charge, so active that Sheriff and other personnel were often lent to other counties. She was on the forefront of establishing the first family planning clinic in the United States that was affiliated with a county health department. She was the first female health officer who focused greatly on the needs of women and children. Sheriff went on to study public health at Harvard University upon receiving a Rockefeller Foundation Fellowship in 1936. She earned her Masters of Public Health the following year. In 1940, she took the position of assistant director of the Division of Maternal and Child Health in Columbia, South Carolina. Throughout the 1940s and 1950s, she focused her efforts on programs to train and license midwives and later advocated for the prevention of child abuse. Sheriff retired from her positions as the deputy commissioner of the State Department of Health and Environmental Control and chief of the Bureau of Community Health Services in 1974.

== Personal life ==
Sheriff married Dr. George Henry Zerbst at the age of 37, a former instructor. Her husband was an ophthalmologist, and they broke the conventional expectations of life revolved around family life. They spent a lot of time together, but they did not settle down and have kids. He died 33 years before she did. After she retired, she traveled the world, including South America, to help create programs in many different communities. She is an example of someone truly devoted to her work.
