= Al-Shamiya District =

Coordinates: 31.77907°N 44.60861°E

Al-Shamiya District Arabic: قضاء الشامية
- District
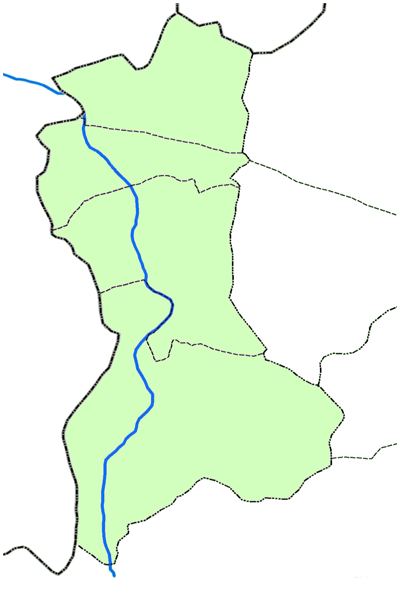
- Map
- Interactive map of Al-Shamiya District
- Country: Iraq
- Governorates: Al-Qādisiyyah Governorate
- Seat: Al-Shamiya

Area
  - Total: 947 km^{2} (366 sq mi)

Population (2015)
  - Total: 145,763
  - Density: 154/km^{2} (399/sq mi)
- Time zone: UTC+3 (AST)

Al-Shamiya District is a district of Al-Qādisiyyah Governorate, Iraq. Its seat is the city of Al-Shamiya. It has four subdistricts: Al-Shamiya (الشامية), Ghammas (غماس), Al-Aslahea (الصلاحية), and Almhnanwip (المهناوية). The Al-Shamiya branch of the Euphrates river runs through the district.
