= Al-Shamiya (Iraq) =

Al-Shamiya الشامية
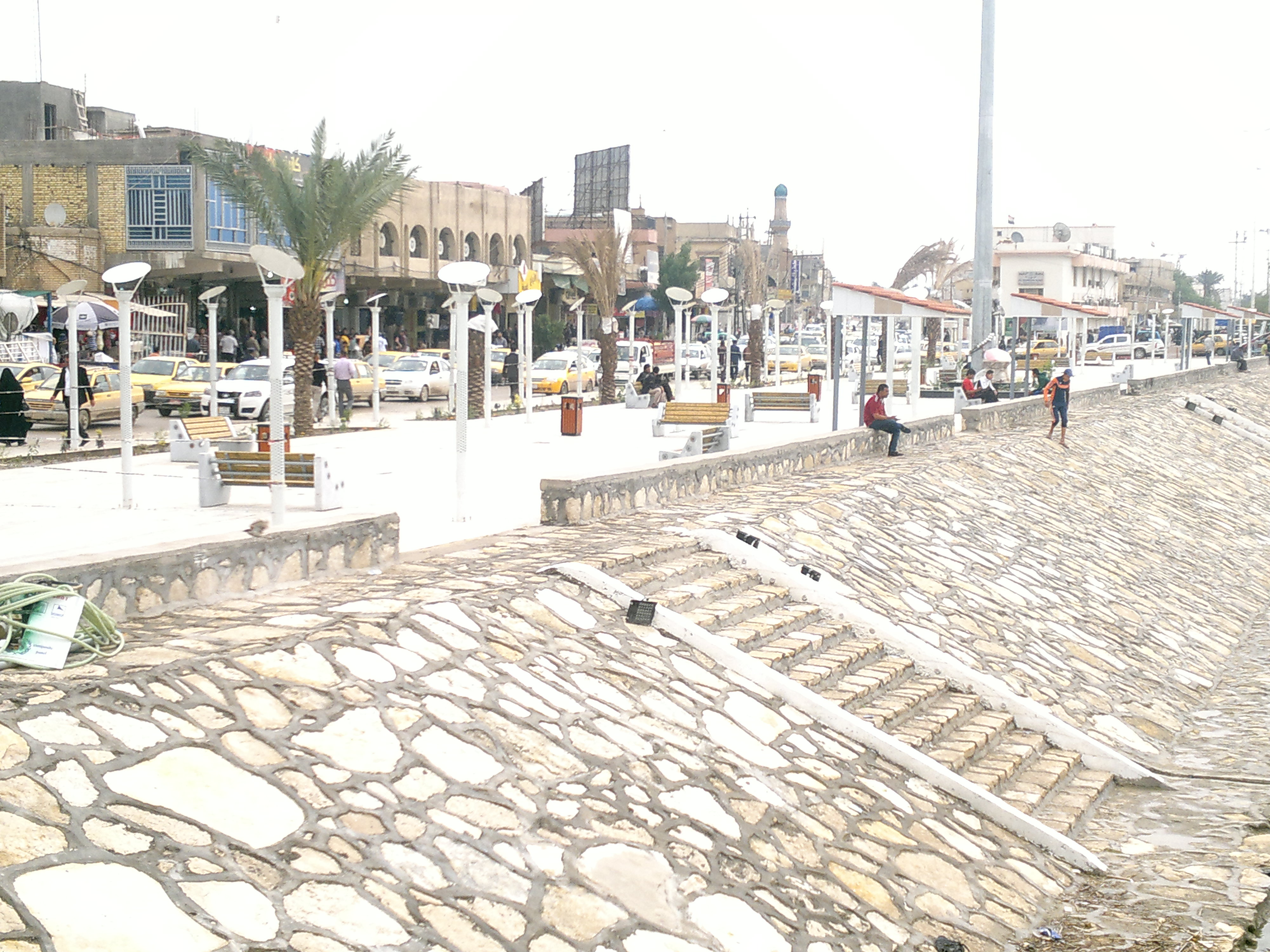
- Street in Al-Shamiya

- Al-Shamiya's location inside Iraq
- Coordinates: 31.963611°N 44.598889°E
- Country: Iraq
- Governorate: Al-Qādisiyyah Governorate
- District: Al-Shamiya
- Elevation: 66 ft (20 m)

Population (2014)
  - Total: ~300,000

Al-Shamiya (Arabic: الشامية) is a city in Al-Shamiya District, Al-Qādisiyyah Governorate, Iraq. It is roughly 147 km south of Baghdad on the Al-Shamiya branch of the Euphrates. Settlement dates back to Sumerian times, but the modern city was established in 1822 during the Ottoman era, named "Hamidya" after Abdul Hamid II. It was renamed al-Shamiya "Levantine" after the establishment of the Kingdom of Iraq.

The city's population has grown quickly, from 189,000 in 1997 to 230,974 in 2007 to an estimated 300,000 in 2014. The population has been homogeneously Twelver Shi'a for centuries, and many descend from the Nakha tribe of Arabia. It is located in the fertile, irrigated, drained, and alluvial plain of the middle Euphrates region. The area surrounding the city is notable for its crops, especially rice, dates, and wheat.
