= Hilla Shamia =

Israeli product designer (born 1983)

Hilla Shamia (Hebrew: הילה שמיע, b. 1983) is an Israeli product designer based in Tel Aviv, Israel. Her works are included in Israel Museum collection as well as in Serge Tiroche collection.

== Biography ==
Upon graduating her Industrial Design studies at Holon Institute of Technology (HIT) in 2011, Shamia opened an independent design studio carrying out material research and development of forms, whilst drawing tremendous inspiration from the process of time and the supposed imperfections found in nature. Shamia is married to Lior Yamin, an industrial designer and owner of SAGA and Asufa. In Israel, Shamia is represented by SAGA.

== Wood Casting ==
Shamia's Wood Casting furniture is made using a technique she developed of casting aluminium or brass on natural wood, contrasting the natural elements of wood and metal. It has been featured in major international design magazines such as Wallpaper, Dezeen, Viewpoint, Financial Times, Elle Decor, Architectural Digest and Cosmopolitan, and has been included in design shows including as London Design Week, Milan Design Week, Ambiente, Frankfurt, and Pitti Filati, Florence. Each piece is hand-made and unique due to the various trees used and depending on the "leakage" of the metal through the wood cracks.

== Other works ==
Alongside the Wood Casting series, the studio also produces wooden pendulum clocks with minimalistic design. As of 2017 Shamia was working with glass, and published her Cactus series, including sculptures and light fixtures. These are made using a traditional crafted glass-blowing technique, with a comical shape of the cactus intended to give the object lightness and humor. In 2017 Shamia displayed her glass-made interpretation for eyewear at the exhibition 'Overview' at Holon Design Museum.

== Collaborations ==
In 2015 Shamia collaborated with Ido Garini, the founder of Studio Appétit, and displayed her project 'Or Brulee' at the 'Things of Edible Beauty' exhibition at 2015 Milan Design Week. It was the first time that the Wood Casting technology combined blackened wood with brass. During her residency at Yeruham Design Terminal, Shamia collaborated with the glass factory Phoenicia, and designed a glass bottle through a disturbance in the factory's 24/7 assembly line. Later that year, as part of 'Syndicate' exhibition, Shamia collaborated with the illustrator Miki Mottes on their Totem project. Based on Mottes' illustration, Shamia created totem-like objects, made in a traditional glass blowing technique.

== Exhibitions ==
- 2018, May- ‘Fresh Paint’ fair – contemporary art and design, Tel Aviv
- 2018, March- ‘Designing the Unexpected’, New in the Collection. The Israel Museum, Jerusalem
- 2017, December – High Contrast, Seol Design Festival.
- 2017, April- ‘Fresh Paint’ fair – contemporary art and design, Tel Aviv
- 2016, December – Overview, Holon Design Museum, Curator: Maya Dvash, Holon, Israel
- 2016, September – High Contrast, Taiwan Designers Week, HIT Faculty of Design, Taiwan
- 2016, July – Torath Ha’Mehabrim, HIT – Holon Institute of Technology, Holon, Israel
- 2016, April – Incantati, Editamateria, Design Week 2016, Milan, Italy
- 2016, January – PITTI FILATI 78, Florence, Italy
- 2015, September – Syndicate, a collaboration with Miki Mottes, SAGA, Tel Aviv, Israel
- 2015, April – Things of Edible Beauty, Design Week 2015, Milan, Italy
- 2015, February – Architectural Digest, Ambiente, Frankfurt, Germany
- 2014, November – Fresh Paint 7, Tel Aviv
- 2014, April – #FollowYourRoots, Entratalibera, Design Week 2014, Milan, Italy
- 2013, September – Budapest Design Week 2013, Hungary
- 2013, September – WONDERLAND, 19GreekStreet, Design Week 2013, London, UK
- 2013, April – RAW/tech, Design Week 2013, Milan
- 2013, April – On The Road, Entratalibera, Design Week 2013, Milan, Italy
- 2013, January – Metamorphose, Megève, France
- 2012, June – 9x3 PRODUCTION, Jaffa, Israel
- 2012, June – 72 Hour Urban Action, Stuttgart, Germany
- 2012, April – Anatomia del Design, Design Week 2012, Milan, Italy
- 2012, March – FAD, Design Space, Tel Aviv, Israel
- 2012, February – Tel Aviv Accessible Art Fair, Design Space, Tel Aviv, Israel
- 2011, September – Inspiration Is, Siam, Herzeliya Pituah, Israel
- 2011, Israeli Design, Asufa Group Exhibition, Jaffa, Israel

== Residencies ==
2015 – Yeruham Design Terminal, Yeruham, Israel

== Prizes ==
2013 – Nominated for the ‘German Design Award 2013’
