= Al-Qādisiyyah Governorate =

Governorate of Iraq

Al-Qadisiyah Governorate محافظة القادسية Al-Diwaniyah Governorate
- Governorate
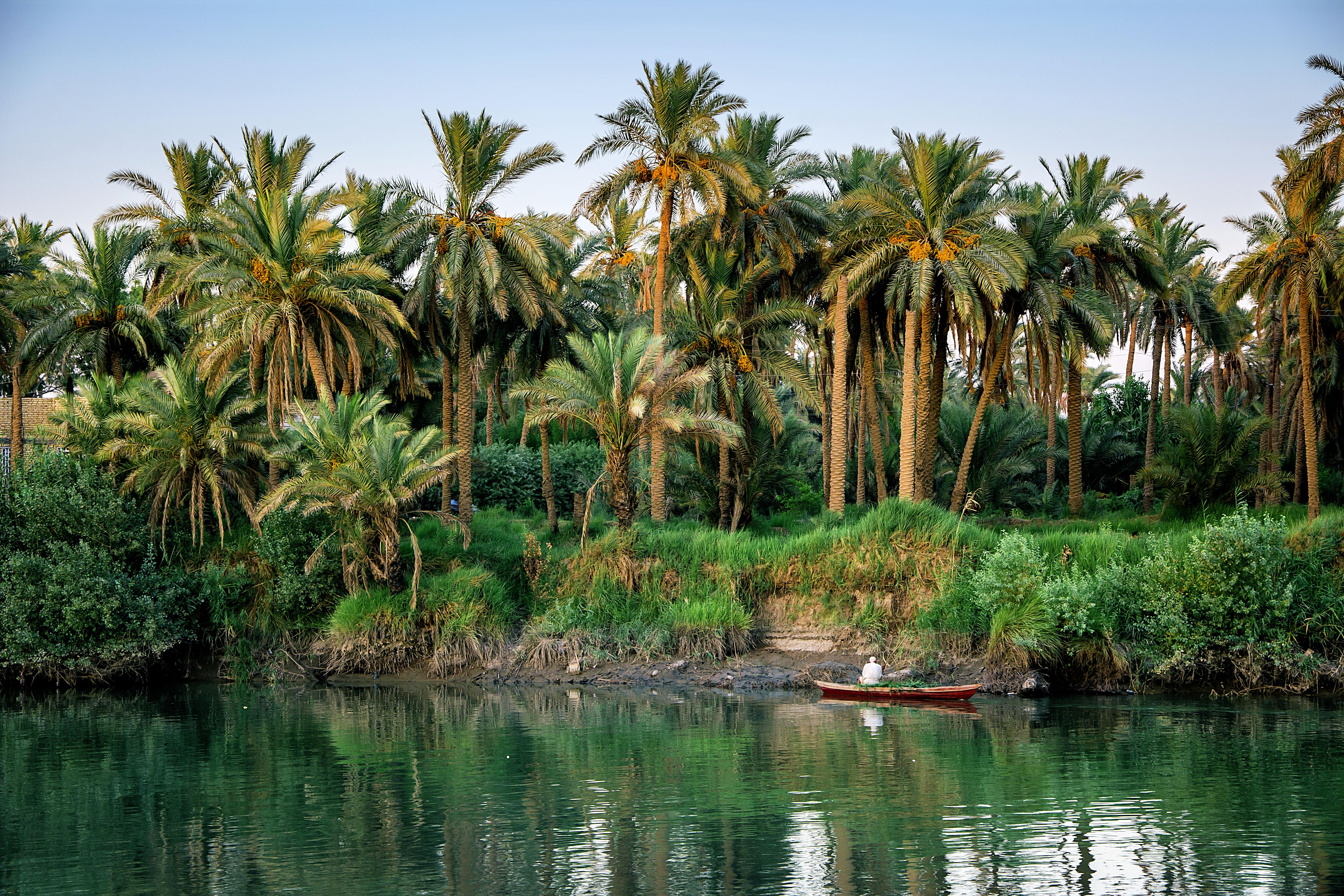

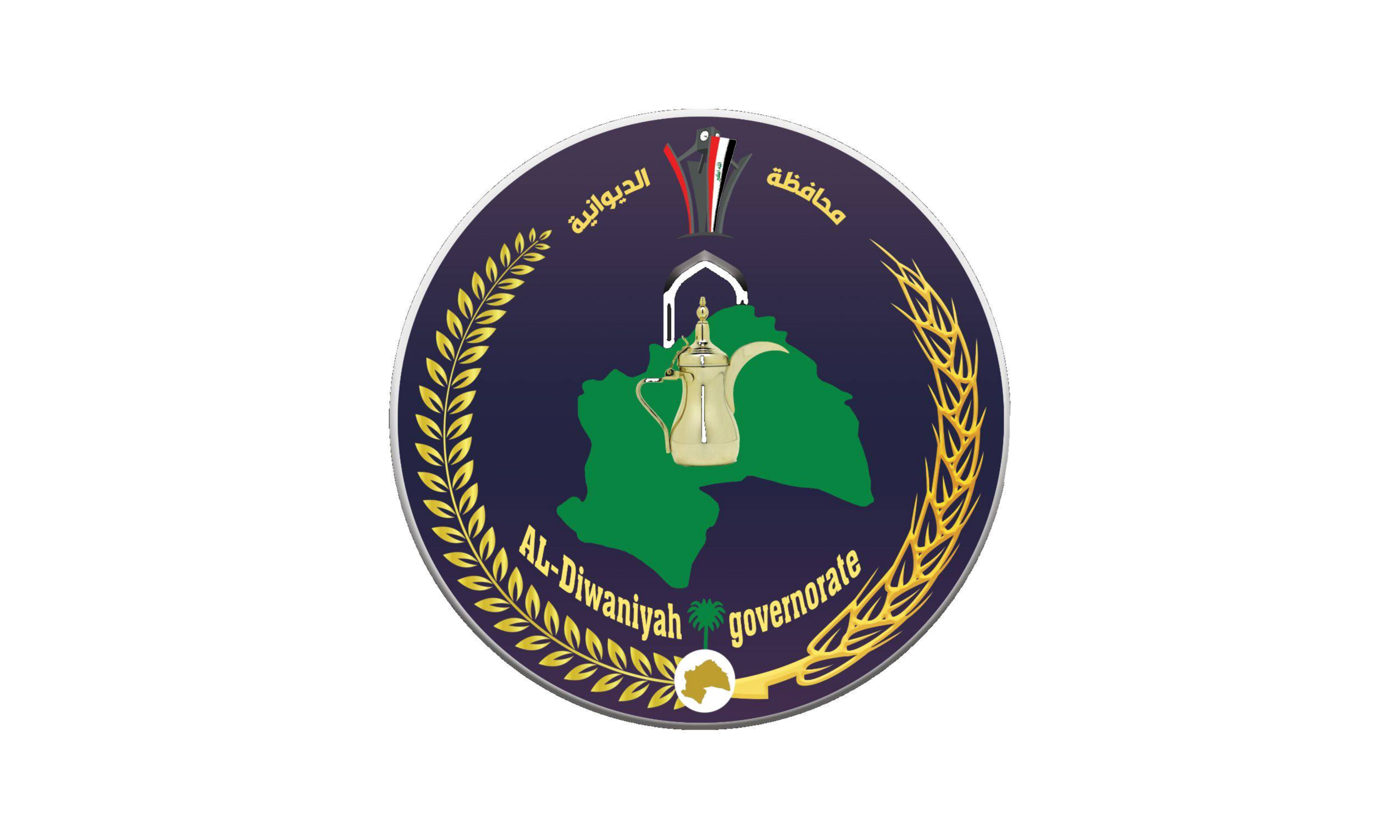
- Flag

- Coordinates: 31°51′N 45°3′E
- Country: Iraq
- Capital: Al Diwaniyah

Government
  - Governor: Abbas al-Zamili

Area
  - Total: 8,153 km^{2} (3,148 sq mi)

Population (2024 census)
  - Total: 1,477,310
  - Density: 181.2/km^{2} (469.3/sq mi)
- HDI (2024): 0.700 high · 12th of 18
- Website: diwaniya.gov.iq

Al-Qadisiyah Governorate (Arabic: القادسية, al-Qādisiyah), also known as the Al-Diwaniyah Governorate (Arabic: ٱلدِّيوَانِيَّة, ad-Dīwānīyah), is one of the governorates of Iraq. It is in the southern part of the center of the country. The estimated population of the province is about a million and a half million people, according to the census of 2014. Its capital is Al Diwaniyah. Before 1976, it was part of the ad-Diwāniyah Governorate, along with al-Muthannā and Najaf. The province is named after the historical city of Al-Qadisiyah, the site of the Battle of al-Qadisiyyah, where in 636 CE the Islamic Rashidun forces defeated the forces of the Sassanid Empire. The governorate is predominantly Shia Arab. It includes the Mesopotamian Marshes of Hor Aldelmj.

== Education ==
There is one public university known as the University of Qadisiyah, which was founded in the late 1980s, and includes colleges such as nursing, pharmacy, law, literature, education, agriculture, medicine and others. The student population is mostly derived from districts and areas of the province and neighbouring provinces. The university is on the old road leading to the city of Hilla. The technical institute of Al-Qadisiyah is approximately 6 km from the city centre.

== Provincial Government ==
- Governor: Sami Al Hasnawi
- Deputy Governor: Hussain Al Mosawi
- Provincial Council Chairman (PCC): Jubayyir Al Jubouri

== Demographics ==
Historical population
Year	Pop.	±% p.a.
1977	423,000	—
1987	559,805	+2.84%
1997	751,331	+2.99%
2009	1,077,614	+3.05%
2024	1,477,310	+2.13%
Source: Citypopulation

== Districts ==
- Hamza
- Shamiya
- Afak
- Diwaniya
