= Muthanna Governorate =

Governorate of Iraq

Muthanna Governorate محافظة المثنى Al Muthanna Province
- Governorate
- Flag Seal

- Coordinates: 30°12′N 45°21′E
- Country: Iraq
- Capital: Samawah
- Named after: Al-Muthanna ibn Haritha

Government
  - Governor: Muhannad al-Attabi

Area
  - Total: 51,740 km^{2} (19,980 sq mi)

Population (2024 census)
  - Total: 1,043,087
  - Density: 20/km^{2} (52/sq mi)
- HDI (2024): 0.673 medium · 17th of 18
- Website: http://muthana.gov.iq/

Muthanna Governorate (Arabic: المثنى Al Muthannā) or Al Muthanna Province, is a province in Iraq, named after the 7th-century Arab general al-Muthanna ibn Haritha. It is in the south of the country, bordering Saudi Arabia and Kuwait. The provincial capital is the city of Samawah.

== History ==
Before 1976 it was part of the Diwaniya Province, which included present-day Najaf Governorate and al-Qādisiyyah Governorate.

Samawah is very close to the ancient Sumerian-Babylonian city of Uruk (Aramaic: Erech), which is possibly the source of the name Iraq. After the decline of Babylon following the Seleucid founding of Seleucia, Uruk became the largest city in southern Babylonia, and its name (Erech) came to replace Babili (Babylonia), as the city long outlived the former capital, surviving into the 7th century AD.

In February 1991 it was the location of one of the largest tank battles in history during the Persian Gulf War, the Battle of Norfolk.

== Demographics ==
Historical population
Year	Pop.	±% p.a.
1977	215,600	—
1987	315,815	+3.89%
1997	436,825	+3.30%
2009	683,126	+3.80%
2024	1,043,087	+2.86%
Source: Citypopulation

== Provincial government ==
- Governor: Ahmed Manfi Judeh
- Deputy Governor: Sami Al-Hassani
- Chairman of Al-Muthanna Provincial Council: Abdul Latif Al-Hassani
