= 2022–23 Iraqi Third Division League =

49th Iraqi Third Division League season

Iraqi Third Division League
- Season: 2022–23
- All statistics correct as of 19 January 2023.

The 2022–23 Iraqi Third Division League was the 49th season of what is now called the Iraqi Second Division League, the fourth tier of the Iraqi football league system, since its establishment in 1974. The number of clubs in the league have varied throughout history for various reasons; 120 clubs participated in this year's edition. The top 38 teams in the league were promoted directly to Iraqi Second Division League. There is no general date for the start of the league, but each subsidiary football association chooses the best time to start the league in their region.

== Teams ==
A total of 120 teams are competing for the league after some teams withdrew for financial reasons. The teams are originally promoted to the Iraqi Second Division League based on the rule of one qualified team out of every five participating teams. The number of teams that will be promoted to the Second Division League will be 38 teams.

== Overview ==
The 120 clubs are supposed to be divided into 18 groups by location (some of these groups play in subgroups as well), and each group represents the province to which these clubs belong and lies within its borders. But there are 5 provinces that do not have clubs that play in this level.

| No. | Governorates | Teams | Promotion to the Iraqi Second Division League |
|---|---|---|---|
| 1 | Dohuk | | |
| 2 | Nineveh | Al-Ayadhiyah; Bazwaya; Hamidat; Narkal; Qalat Tel Afar; Salam Tel Afar; Shabab Al-Qayyara; Shabab Sinjar; Sinjar; Talsquf; Tarmi | |
| 3 | Erbil | | |
| 4 | Kirkuk | Al-Ekhaa; Al-Nujoom; Al-Turkman; Altun Kupri; Baba Gurgur; Ittihad Kirkuk; Khak; Teseen | |
| 5 | Sulaymaniyah | | |
| 6 | Saladin | Al-Dhuluiya; Al-Jarnaf; Al-Malwiya; Saad; Salahaddin; Tikrit | Al-Dhuluiya; Salahaddin |
| 7 | Al Anbar | A'ali Al-Furat; Abu Risha; Al-Dawar; Al-Fosfat; Al-Nassaf; Al-Qaeim; Al-Rutba; Al-Saqlawiya; Al-Siddiqiya; Al-Wihda; Barwana; Haditha; Ittihad Al-Jazira; Rawa | Al-Dawar; Ittihad Al-Jazira |
| 8 | Baghdad | Al-Ain; Al-Atheer; Al-Baiyaa; Al-Difaa Al-Jawi; Al-Majd; Al-Mawared Al-Maiya; Al-Nahdha; Al-Radd Al-Sariea; Al-Shabab; Al-Sinaat Al-Harbiya; Al-Tarmiya; Al-Tatweer; Bismaya; Biladi; Junoob Baghdad; Shabab Al-Adil; Shabab Al-Khairat; Tayaran Al-Jaish | Al-Difaa Al-Jawi; Al-Radd Al-Sariea; Al-Shabab; Al-Sinaat Al-Harbiya |
| 9 | Diyala | Al-Mansouriya; Al-Miqdadiya; Al-Sudour; Al-Yarmouk; Al-Wand; Bani Saad; Baquba; Buhriz; Hibhib; Jalawla; Khanaqin; Mandali; Shamal Al-Miqdadiya | Al-Mansouriya; Al-Sudour; Buhriz |
| 10 | Karbala | Al-Ebdaa; Al-Jamahir; Al-Nidhal; Al-Taff; Al-Tufoof; Ain Al-Tamur; Imam Al-Muttaqeen; Shabab Al-Hussein | Al-Ebdaa |
| 11 | Babil | Al-Hashimiya; Al-Midhatiya; Al-Neel; Al-Sadda; Al-Shomali | Al-Hashimiya |
| 12 | Wasit | Al-Ahrar; Al-Dujaila; Al-Falahiya; Al-Karimiya; Al-Khajiya; Al-Muntadher; Al-Nahrain; Al-Sharqiya; Al-Shuhadaa; Al-Wafaa; Al-Wydad; Wasit | Al-Falahiya; Al-Wydad; Wasit |
| 13 | Najaf | | |
| 14 | Al-Qādisiyyah | Al-Yaqdha; Ghammas | Ghammas |
| 15 | Maysan | Ahrar Maysan; Ahly Maysan; Al-Amara; Al-Shaheed Saad; Ali Al-Gharbi; Kumayt; Salam Maysan | |
| 16 | Muthanna | | |
| 17 | Dhi Qar | Al-Amir; Al-Bathaa; Al-Dawaya; Al-Dhifaf; Al-Fohoud; Al-Fajr; Al-Nassr; Baladiyat Al-Nasiriyah; Dhi Qar; Maysaloon; Qalat Sukar; Teshrin | Teshrin |
| 18 | Basra | Al-Faw; Al-Midaina; Shatt Al-Arab; Umm Qasr | Al-Faw |

== League tables ==
=== 1- Dohuk Group ===
There are no teams in Dohuk that play in this division.

=== 2- Nineveh Group ===
TBD

=== 3- Erbil Group ===
There are no teams in Erbil that play in this division.

=== 4- Kirkuk Group ===
==== Group 1 ====
| Pos | Team | Pld | W | D | L | GF | GA | GD | Pts | Promotion |
|---|---|---|---|---|---|---|---|---|---|---|
| 1 | Al-Ekhaa | 0 | 0 | 0 | 0 | 0 | 0 | 0 | 0 | Promotion to the Iraqi Second Division League |
| 2 | Altun Kupri | 0 | 0 | 0 | 0 | 0 | 0 | 0 | 0 | |
| 3 | Baba Gurgur | 0 | 0 | 0 | 0 | 0 | 0 | 0 | 0 | |
| 4 | Ittihad Kirkuk | 0 | 0 | 0 | 0 | 0 | 0 | 0 | 0 | |

Updated to match(es) played on 19 January 2023. Source: iraqi.3rd
Rules for classification: 1) points; 2) goal difference; 3) number of goals scored.

==== Group 2 ====
| Pos | Team | Pld | W | D | L | GF | GA | GD | Pts | Promotion |
|---|---|---|---|---|---|---|---|---|---|---|
| 1 | Al-Nujoom | 0 | 0 | 0 | 0 | 0 | 0 | 0 | 0 | Promotion to the Iraqi Second Division League |
| 2 | Al-Turkman | 0 | 0 | 0 | 0 | 0 | 0 | 0 | 0 | |
| 3 | Khak | 0 | 0 | 0 | 0 | 0 | 0 | 0 | 0 | |
| 4 | Teseen | 0 | 0 | 0 | 0 | 0 | 0 | 0 | 0 | |

Updated to match(es) played on 19 January 2023. Source: iraqi.3rd
Rules for classification: 1) points; 2) goal difference; 3) number of goals scored.

=== 5- Sulaymaniyah Group ===
There are no teams in Sulaymaniyah that play in this division.

=== 6- Saladin Group ===
==== Group 1 ====
| Pos | Team | Pld | W | D | L | GF | GA | GD | Pts | Promotion |
|---|---|---|---|---|---|---|---|---|---|---|
| 1 | Salahaddin (P) | 2 | 2 | 0 | 0 | 5 | 1 | +4 | 6 | Promotion to the Iraqi Second Division League |
| 2 | Al-Jarnaf | 3 | 1 | 0 | 2 | 6 | 8 | −2 | 3 | |
| 3 | Saad | 3 | 1 | 0 | 2 | 4 | 6 | −2 | 3 | |

Updated to match(es) played on 19 January 2023. Source: iraqi.3rd
Rules for classification: 1) points; 2) head-to-head points; 3) head-to-head goal difference; 4) goal difference; 5) number of wins; 6) number of goals scored.
(P) Promoted

==== Group 2 ====
| Pos | Team | Pld | W | D | L | GF | GA | GD | Pts | Promotion |
|---|---|---|---|---|---|---|---|---|---|---|
| 1 | Al-Dhuluiya (P) | 3 | 1 | 2 | 0 | 8 | 7 | +1 | 5 | Promotion to the Iraqi Second Division League |
| 2 | Al-Malwiya | 3 | 0 | 3 | 0 | 8 | 8 | 0 | 3 | |
| 3 | Tikrit | 4 | 0 | 3 | 1 | 9 | 10 | −1 | 3 | |

Updated to match(es) played on 19 January 2023. Source: iraqi.3rd
Rules for classification: 1) points; 2) head-to-head points; 3) head-to-head goal difference; 4) goal difference; 5) number of wins; 6) number of goals scored.
(P) Promoted

=== 7- Al-Anbar Group ===
==== Group 1 ====
| Pos | Team | Pld | W | D | L | GF | GA | GD | Pts | Promotion |
|---|---|---|---|---|---|---|---|---|---|---|
| 1 | Al-Dawar (P) | 5 | 3 | 2 | 0 | 0 | 0 | 0 | 11 | Promotion to the Iraqi Second Division League |
| 2 | A'ali Al-Furat (O) | 5 | 3 | 1 | 1 | 0 | 0 | 0 | 10 | Qualification for the Play-off |
| 3 | Barwana | 4 | 2 | 1 | 1 | 0 | 0 | 0 | 7 | |
| 4 | Al-Nassaf | 4 | 1 | 1 | 2 | 0 | 0 | 0 | 4 | |
| 5 | Al-Fosfat | 4 | 1 | 1 | 2 | 0 | 0 | 0 | 4 | |
| 6 | Haditha | 4 | 0 | 0 | 4 | 0 | 0 | 0 | 0 | |
| 7 | Rawa | 0 | 0 | 0 | 0 | 0 | 0 | 0 | 0 | |

Updated to match(es) played on 14 February 2023. Source: iraqi.3rd
Rules for classification: 1) points; 2) goal difference; 3) number of goals scored.
(O) Play-off winners; (P) Promoted

==== Group 2 ====
| Pos | Team | Pld | W | D | L | GF | GA | GD | Pts | Promotion |
|---|---|---|---|---|---|---|---|---|---|---|
| 1 | Ittihad Al-Jazira (P) | 0 | 0 | 0 | 0 | 0 | 0 | 0 | 0 | Promotion to the Iraqi Second Division League |
| 2 | Al-Rutba (O) | 0 | 0 | 0 | 0 | 0 | 0 | 0 | 0 | Qualification for the Play-off |
| 3 | Al-Qaeim | 0 | 0 | 0 | 0 | 0 | 0 | 0 | 0 | |
| 4 | Al-Saqlawiya | 0 | 0 | 0 | 0 | 0 | 0 | 0 | 0 | |
| 5 | Al-Siddiqiya | 0 | 0 | 0 | 0 | 0 | 0 | 0 | 0 | |
| 6 | Al-Wihda | 0 | 0 | 0 | 0 | 0 | 0 | 0 | 0 | |
| 7 | Abu Risha | 0 | 0 | 0 | 0 | 0 | 0 | 0 | 0 | |

Updated to match(es) played on 19 January 2023. Source: iraqi.3rd
Rules for classification: 1) points; 2) goal difference; 3) number of goals scored.
(O) Play-off winners; (P) Promoted

=== 8- Baghdad Groups ===
==== Group 1 ====
| Pos | Team | Pld | W | D | L | GF | GA | GD | Pts | Promotion |
|---|---|---|---|---|---|---|---|---|---|---|
| 1 | Al-Radd Al-Sariea (P) | 9 | 7 | 1 | 1 | 28 | 10 | +18 | 22 | Promotion to the Iraqi Second Division League |
| 2 | Al-Shabab (O, P) | 9 | 7 | 1 | 1 | 22 | 7 | +15 | 22 | Qualification for the Play-off |
| 3 | Shabab Al-Adil | 9 | 5 | 2 | 2 | 20 | 10 | +10 | 17 | |
| 4 | Al-Mawared Al-Maiya | 9 | 3 | 0 | 6 | 12 | 18 | −6 | 9 | |
| 5 | Biladi | 9 | 1 | 0 | 8 | 17 | 40 | −23 | 3 | |
| 6 | Al-Atheer | 5 | 0 | 0 | 5 | 3 | 17 | −14 | 0 | |

Updated to match(es) played on 1 June 2023. Source: iraqi.3rd
Rules for classification: 1) points; 2) head-to-head points; 3) head-to-head goal difference; 4) goal difference; 5) number of wins; 6) number of goals scored.
(O) Play-off winners; (P) Promoted

==== Group 2 ====
| Pos | Team | Pld | W | D | L | GF | GA | GD | Pts | Promotion |
|---|---|---|---|---|---|---|---|---|---|---|
| 1 | Al-Sinaat Al-Harbiya (P) | 4 | 4 | 0 | 0 | 18 | 2 | +16 | 12 | Promotion to the Iraqi Second Division League |
| 2 | Al-Nahdha (O) | 4 | 2 | 1 | 1 | 7 | 9 | −2 | 7 | Qualification for the Play-off |
| 3 | Al-Ain | 4 | 1 | 1 | 2 | 3 | 9 | −6 | 4 | |
| 4 | Junoob Baghdad | 4 | 1 | 0 | 3 | 7 | 8 | −1 | 3 | |
| 5 | Tayaran Al-Jaish | 4 | 0 | 2 | 2 | 7 | 14 | −7 | 2 | |
| 6 | Al-Majd (Note: Al-Majd withdrew from the tournament.) | 0 | 0 | 0 | 0 | 0 | 0 | 0 | 0 | |

Updated to match(es) played on 10 May 2023. Source: iraqi.3rd
Rules for classification: 1) points; 2) goal difference; 3) number of goals scored.
(O) Play-off winners; (P) Promoted

==== Group 3 ====
| Pos | Team | Pld | W | D | L | GF | GA | GD | Pts | Promotion |
|---|---|---|---|---|---|---|---|---|---|---|
| 1 | Al-Difaa Al-Jawi (P) | 5 | 4 | 0 | 1 | 15 | 12 | +3 | 12 | Promotion to the Iraqi Second Division League |
| 2 | Bismaya (O) | 5 | 2 | 2 | 1 | 11 | 7 | +4 | 8 | Qualification for the Play-off |
| 3 | Al-Tarmiya | 5 | 2 | 1 | 2 | 10 | 9 | +1 | 7 | |
| 4 | Al-Tatweer | 5 | 2 | 0 | 3 | 7 | 9 | −2 | 6 | |
| 5 | Shabab Al-Khairat | 5 | 2 | 0 | 3 | 5 | 8 | −3 | 6 | |
| 6 | Al-Baiyaa | 5 | 1 | 1 | 3 | 6 | 9 | −3 | 4 | |

Updated to match(es) played on 10 May 2023. Source: iraqi.3rd
Rules for classification: 1) points; 2) goal difference; 3) number of goals scored.
(O) Play-off winners; (P) Promoted

=== 9- Diyala Group ===
==== Group 1 ====
| Pos | Team | Pld | W | D | L | GF | GA | GD | Pts | Promotion |
|---|---|---|---|---|---|---|---|---|---|---|
| 1 | Al-Mansouriya (P) | 11 | 7 | 3 | 1 | 26 | 14 | +12 | 24 | Promotion to the Iraqi Second Division League |
| 2 | Al-Sudour (P) | 10 | 5 | 3 | 2 | 19 | 15 | +4 | 18 | Qualification for the Play-off |
| 3 | Bani Saad | 11 | 5 | 3 | 3 | 24 | 17 | +7 | 18 | |
| 4 | Al-Miqdadiya | 10 | 3 | 2 | 5 | 17 | 21 | −4 | 11 | |
| 5 | Al-Wand | 10 | 3 | 2 | 5 | 15 | 22 | −7 | 11 | |
| 6 | Hibhib | 10 | 2 | 4 | 4 | 16 | 19 | −3 | 10 | |
| 7 | Mandali | 6 | 0 | 1 | 5 | 10 | 19 | −9 | 1 | |

Updated to match(es) played on 10 March 2023. Source: iraqi.3rd
Rules for classification: 1) points; 2) head-to-head points; 3) head-to-head goal difference; 4) goal difference; 5) number of wins; 6) number of goals scored.
(P) Promoted

==== Group 2 ====
| Pos | Team | Pld | W | D | L | GF | GA | GD | Pts | Promotion |
|---|---|---|---|---|---|---|---|---|---|---|
| 1 | Buhriz (P) | 10 | 7 | 2 | 1 | 26 | 10 | +16 | 23 | Promotion to the Iraqi Second Division League |
| 2 | Jalawla | 9 | 5 | 3 | 1 | 24 | 10 | +14 | 18 | Qualification for the Play-off |
| 3 | Baquba | 10 | 5 | 2 | 3 | 21 | 16 | +5 | 17 | |
| 4 | Khanaqin | 9 | 4 | 3 | 2 | 20 | 9 | +11 | 15 | |
| 5 | Al-Yarmouk | 9 | 1 | 1 | 7 | 8 | 25 | −17 | 4 | |
| 6 | Shamal Al-Miqdadiya | 9 | 0 | 1 | 8 | 10 | 39 | −29 | 1 | |

Updated to match(es) played on 9 March 2023. Source: iraqi.3rd
Rules for classification: 1) points; 2) head-to-head points; 3) head-to-head goal difference; 4) goal difference; 5) number of wins; 6) number of goals scored.
(P) Promoted

=== 10- Karbalaa Group ===
==== Group 1 ====
| Pos | Team | Pld | W | D | L | GF | GA | GD | Pts | Promotion |
|---|---|---|---|---|---|---|---|---|---|---|
| 1 | Ain Al-Tamur | 3 | 3 | 0 | 0 | 6 | 2 | +4 | 9 | Promotion to the Iraqi Second Division League |
| 2 | Al-Tufoof | 3 | 2 | 0 | 1 | 7 | 4 | +3 | 6 | |
| 3 | Al-Taff | 3 | 1 | 0 | 2 | 3 | 5 | −2 | 3 | |
| 4 | Imam Al-Muttaqeen | 3 | 0 | 0 | 3 | 5 | 10 | −5 | 0 | |

Updated to match(es) played on 19 January 2023. Source: iraqi.3rd
Rules for classification: 1) points; 2) goal difference; 3) number of goals scored.

==== Group 2 ====
| Pos | Team | Pld | W | D | L | GF | GA | GD | Pts | Promotion |
|---|---|---|---|---|---|---|---|---|---|---|
| 1 | Al-Ebdaa (P) | 3 | 2 | 1 | 0 | 9 | 1 | +8 | 7 | Promotion to the Iraqi Second Division League |
| 2 | Al-Jamahir | 3 | 1 | 2 | 0 | 6 | 2 | +4 | 5 | |
| 3 | Shabab Al-Hussein | 3 | 1 | 1 | 1 | 6 | 9 | −3 | 4 | |
| 4 | Al-Nidhal | 3 | 0 | 0 | 3 | 5 | 14 | −9 | 0 | |

Updated to match(es) played on 21 January 2023. Source: iraqi.3rd
Rules for classification: 1) points; 2) goal difference; 3) number of goals scored.
(P) Promoted

=== 11- Babil Group ===
| Pos | Team | Pld | W | D | L | GF | GA | GD | Pts | Promotion |
|---|---|---|---|---|---|---|---|---|---|---|
| 1 | Al-Hashimiya (P) | 7 | 5 | 1 | 1 | 11 | 4 | +7 | 16 | Promotion to the Iraqi Second Division League |
| 2 | Al-Sadda | 6 | 2 | 2 | 2 | 6 | 7 | −1 | 8 | |
| 3 | Al-Midhatiya | 5 | 1 | 3 | 1 | 5 | 5 | 0 | 6 | |
| 4 | Al-Shomali | 5 | 1 | 3 | 1 | 8 | 8 | 0 | 6 | |
| 5 | Al-Neel | 5 | 0 | 1 | 4 | 4 | 10 | −6 | 1 | |

Updated to match(es) played on 17 February 2023. Source: iraqi.3rd
Rules for classification: 1) points; 2) head-to-head points; 3) head-to-head goal difference; 4) goal difference; 5) number of wins; 6) number of goals scored.
(P) Promoted

=== 12- Wasit Groups ===
==== Group 1 ====
| Pos | Team | Pld | W | D | L | GF | GA | GD | Pts | Promotion |
|---|---|---|---|---|---|---|---|---|---|---|
| 1 | Al-Falahiya (P) | 0 | 0 | 0 | 0 | 0 | 0 | 0 | 0 | Promotion to the Iraqi Second Division League |
| 2 | Al-Dujaila | 0 | 0 | 0 | 0 | 0 | 0 | 0 | 0 | |
| 3 | Al-Khajiya | 0 | 0 | 0 | 0 | 0 | 0 | 0 | 0 | |
| 4 | Al-Wafaa | 0 | 0 | 0 | 0 | 0 | 0 | 0 | 0 | |

Updated to match(es) played on 19 January 2023. Source: iraqi.3rd
Rules for classification: 1) points; 2) goal difference; 3) number of goals scored.
(P) Promoted

==== Group 2 ====
| Pos | Team | Pld | W | D | L | GF | GA | GD | Pts | Promotion |
|---|---|---|---|---|---|---|---|---|---|---|
| 1 | Wasit (P) | 0 | 0 | 0 | 0 | 0 | 0 | 0 | 0 | Promotion to the Iraqi Second Division League |
| 2 | Al-Karimiya | 0 | 0 | 0 | 0 | 0 | 0 | 0 | 0 | |
| 3 | Al-Nahrain | 0 | 0 | 0 | 0 | 0 | 0 | 0 | 0 | |
| 4 | Al-Ahrar | 0 | 0 | 0 | 0 | 0 | 0 | 0 | 0 | |

Updated to match(es) played on 19 January 2023. Source: iraqi.3rd
Rules for classification: 1) points; 2) goal difference; 3) number of goals scored.
(P) Promoted

==== Group 3 ====
| Pos | Team | Pld | W | D | L | GF | GA | GD | Pts | Promotion |
|---|---|---|---|---|---|---|---|---|---|---|
| 1 | Al-Wydad (P) | 0 | 0 | 0 | 0 | 0 | 0 | 0 | 0 | Promotion to the Iraqi Second Division League |
| 2 | Al-Sharqiya | 0 | 0 | 0 | 0 | 0 | 0 | 0 | 0 | |
| 3 | Al-Shuhadaa | 0 | 0 | 0 | 0 | 0 | 0 | 0 | 0 | |
| 4 | Al-Muntadher | 0 | 0 | 0 | 0 | 0 | 0 | 0 | 0 | |

Updated to match(es) played on 19 January 2023. Source: iraqi.3rd
Rules for classification: 1) points; 2) goal difference; 3) number of goals scored.
(P) Promoted

=== 13- Al-Najaf Group ===
There are no teams in Al-Najaf that play in this division.

=== 14- Al-Qādisiyyah Group ===
| Pos | Team | Pld | W | D | L | GF | GA | GD | Pts | Promotion |
|---|---|---|---|---|---|---|---|---|---|---|
| 1 | Ghammas (P) | 0 | 0 | 0 | 0 | 0 | 0 | 0 | 0 | Promotion to the Iraqi Second Division League |
| 2 | Al-Yaqdha | 0 | 0 | 0 | 0 | 0 | 0 | 0 | 0 | |

Updated to match(es) played on 19 January 2023. Source: iraqi.3rd
Rules for classification: 1) points; 2) goal difference; 3) number of goals scored.
(P) Promoted

=== 15- Maysan Group ===
==== Group 1 ====
| Pos | Team | Pld | W | D | L | GF | GA | GD | Pts | Promotion |
|---|---|---|---|---|---|---|---|---|---|---|
| 1 | Kumayt | 2 | 2 | 0 | 0 | 3 | 1 | +2 | 6 | Promotion to the Iraqi Second Division League |
| 2 | Salam Maysan | 2 | 1 | 0 | 1 | 4 | 3 | +1 | 3 | |
| 3 | Ahly Maysan | 2 | 0 | 0 | 2 | 1 | 4 | −3 | 0 | |

Updated to match(es) played on 9 February 2023. Source: iraqi.3rd
Rules for classification: 1) points; 2) goal difference; 3) number of goals scored.

==== Group 1 ====
| Pos | Team | Pld | W | D | L | GF | GA | GD | Pts | Promotion |
|---|---|---|---|---|---|---|---|---|---|---|
| 1 | Ali Al-Gharbi | 3 | 2 | 1 | 0 | 6 | 4 | +2 | 7 | Promotion to the Iraqi Second Division League |
| 2 | Ahrar Maysan | 3 | 1 | 1 | 1 | 4 | 3 | +1 | 4 | |
| 3 | Al-Shaheed Saad | 3 | 1 | 0 | 2 | 6 | 7 | −1 | 3 | |
| 4 | Al-Amara | 3 | 1 | 0 | 2 | 5 | 7 | −2 | 3 | |

Updated to match(es) played on 9 February 2023. Source: iraqi.3rd
Rules for classification: 1) points; 2) goal difference; 3) number of goals scored.

=== 16- Al-Muthanna Group ===
There are no teams in Al-Muthanna that play in this division.

=== 17- Dhi Qar Group ===
==== Group 1 ====
| Pos | Team | Pld | W | D | L | GF | GA | GD | Pts | Promotion |
|---|---|---|---|---|---|---|---|---|---|---|
| 1 | Al-Fajr | 4 | 4 | 0 | 0 | 11 | 2 | +9 | 12 | Promotion to the Iraqi Second Division League |
| 2 | Maysaloon | 4 | 2 | 0 | 2 | 8 | 6 | +2 | 6 | |
| 3 | Al-Dawaya | 3 | 2 | 0 | 1 | 2 | 3 | −1 | 6 | |
| 4 | Al-Dhifaf | 4 | 1 | 0 | 3 | 6 | 9 | −3 | 3 | |
| 5 | Qalat Sukar | 3 | 1 | 0 | 2 | 5 | 8 | −3 | 3 | |
| 6 | Al-Amir | 4 | 1 | 0 | 3 | 4 | 9 | −5 | 3 | |

Updated to match(es) played on 17 March 2023. Source: iraqi.3rd
Rules for classification: 1) points; 2) goal difference; 3) number of goals scored.

==== Group 2 ====
| Pos | Team | Pld | W | D | L | GF | GA | GD | Pts | Promotion |
|---|---|---|---|---|---|---|---|---|---|---|
| 1 | Teshrin (P) | 4 | 3 | 1 | 0 | 8 | 2 | +6 | 10 | Promotion to the Iraqi Second Division League |
| 2 | Baladiyat Al-Nasiriyah | 4 | 2 | 1 | 1 | 3 | 1 | +2 | 7 | |
| 3 | Dhi Qar | 4 | 1 | 2 | 1 | 5 | 6 | −1 | 5 | |
| 4 | Al-Fohoud | 4 | 1 | 1 | 2 | 8 | 7 | +1 | 4 | |
| 5 | Al-Nasr | 4 | 1 | 1 | 2 | 6 | 5 | +1 | 4 | |
| 6 | Al-Bathaa | 4 | 1 | 0 | 3 | 3 | 11 | −8 | 3 | |

Updated to match(es) played on 17 March 2023. Source: iraqi.3rd
Rules for classification: 1) points; 2) goal difference; 3) number of goals scored.
(P) Promoted

=== 18- Basra Group ===
| Pos | Team | Pld | W | D | L | GF | GA | GD | Pts | Promotion |
|---|---|---|---|---|---|---|---|---|---|---|
| 1 | Al-Faw (P) | 5 | 3 | 1 | 1 | 14 | 8 | +6 | 10 | Promotion to the Iraqi Second Division League |
| 2 | Umm Qasr | 5 | 1 | 3 | 1 | 10 | 10 | 0 | 6 | |
| 3 | Al-Midaina | 4 | 1 | 1 | 2 | 6 | 8 | −2 | 4 | |
| 4 | Shatt Al-Arab | 4 | 1 | 1 | 2 | 5 | 9 | −4 | 4 | |

Updated to match(es) played on 5 March 2023. Source: iraqi.3rd
Rules for classification: 1) points; 2) head-to-head points; 3) head-to-head goal difference; 4) goal difference; 5) number of wins; 6) number of goals scored.
(P) Promoted
