= 2012–13 Iraq FA Cup =

Tournament details
- Country: Iraq
- Teams: 40

Final positions
- Champions: N/A (tournament cancelled)

The 2012–13 Iraq FA Cup was the 26th edition of the Iraq FA Cup as a club competition, the main domestic cup in Iraqi football. It was the first edition held since the 2002–03 season.

The tournament was cancelled during the round of 32 because of scheduling difficulties the Iraq Football Association had with the 2012–13 Iraqi Elite League.

== Format ==
=== Participation ===
The cup started with a qualifying round of thirteen teams from the Iraqi First Division League, twelve of which played against each other and one of which proceeded to the play-off round. The play-off round was played between three teams from the First Division League and one from the Iraqi Elite League. The other seventeen teams of the Iraqi Elite League and the rest of the First Division League joined the other teams in the round of 32.

=== Draw ===
For the first round, the participating teams were split into two pots of six teams in one and seven in the other. For the remaining rounds other than the final, the draw would have been conducted from just one pot. The final would have been held at the Al-Shaab Stadium, a nominally neutral venue.

=== Match rules ===
Teams met in one game in the first round. In the play-off round, round of 32, 16 and the quarter-finals, the teams would have had two-legged ties. The semi-finals and the final would have had one-legged ties. A match took place for 90 minutes, with two halves of 45 minutes each. If still tied after regulation or tied on aggregate, 30 minutes of extra time were played, consisting of two periods of 15 minutes each. If the score was still level after this, the match was decided by a penalty shoot-out. A coin toss decided who took the first penalty.

=== Cards ===
If a player received a second yellow card, they were banned from the next cup match. If a player received a red card, they were banned a minimum of one match, but more could be added by the Iraq Football Association.

== Participating clubs ==
The following 40 teams qualified for the competition:

**Iraqi Elite League**; 18 clubs from the 2012–13 season	**Iraqi First Division League**; 22 clubs from the 2012–13 season
**Al-Kahrabaa**; **Al-Minaa**; **Al-Naft**; **Al-Najaf**; **Al-Quwa Al-Jawiya**; **Al-Shorta**; **Al-Sinaa**; **Al-Talaba**; Al-Zawraa; **Baghdad**; **Duhok**; **Erbil**; **Karbala**; **Kirkuk**; **Masafi Al-Wasat**; **Naft Al-Junoob**; **Sulaymaniya**; **Zakho**	Al-Anbar; Al-Fahad; **Al-Hudood**; Al-Hindiya; Al-Hurr; Al-Kadhimiya; Al-Karkh; Al-Khutoot; Al-Midhatiya; Al-Najda; Al-Oloom wal-Technologia; Al-Sinaat Al-Kahrabaiya; Al-Taji; Biladi; Al-Diwaniya; **Ghaz Al-Shamal**; Al-Kufa; Naft Al-Wasat; Naft Maysan; Al-Samawa; Al-Shirqat; Tuz

- **Bold** indicates the team is still in the competition.

=== Map ===
Locations of the 2012–13 Iraq FA Cup clubs

Baghdad teams	Kirkuk teams	Karbala teams	Najaf teams	Basra teams
Al-Hudood; Al-Kadhimiya; Al-Kahrabaa; Al-Karkh; Al-Khutoot; Al-Naft; Al-Najda; Al-Oloom wal-Technologia; Al-Quwa Al-Jawiya; Al-Shorta; Al-Sinaa; Al-Sinaat Al-Kahrabaiya; Al-Talaba; Al-Zawraa; Baghdad; Biladi; Masafi Al-Wasat	Kirkuk; Ghaz Al-Shamal	Karbala; Al-Hurr	Al-Najaf; Naft Al-Wasat; Al-Kufa	Al-Minaa; Naft Al-Junoob

== Schedule ==
The rounds of the 2012–13 competition were scheduled as follows:

Round	Draw date	Matches dates
First round	15 September 2012	28 September 2012
Play-off round	15 September 2012	6–13 October 2012
Round of 32	15 September 2012	3 December 2012 – 10 June 2013

== First round ==
Times are in AST (UTC+03:00).

28 September 2012	Naft Al-Wasat	4–0	Al-Samawa	Najaf
15:00				Stadium: Al-Najaf Stadium

28 September 2012	Al-Diwaniya	4–1	Tuz	Diwaniya
15:00				Stadium: Al-Diwaniya Stadium

28 September 2012	Al-Fahad	2–3	Al-Kadhimiya	Ramadi
15:00	Jasim Sarhan 27'; Ahmed Jasim 73'	Report	Haider Ibrahim 64'; Arkan Ahmed 80', 93'	Stadium: Al-Ramadi Stadium; Referee: Dhiyaa Jindeel

28 September 2012	Al-Hurr	0–0 (3–2 p)	Al-Midhatiya	Karbala
15:00				Stadium: Karbala Stadium

28 September 2012	Al-Taji	2–2 (2–3 p)	Naft Maysan	Taji
15:00				Stadium: Al-Taji Stadium

28 September 2012	Al-Karkh	1–1 (4–2 p)	Al-Oloom wal-Technologia	Baghdad
15:00				Stadium: Al-Karkh Stadium

== Play-off round ==
=== First legs ===
6 October 2012	Naft Maysan	2–2	Duhok	Amarah
15:00				Stadium: Al-Maimouna Stadium

6 October 2012	Naft Al-Wasat	1–1	Al-Sinaat Al-Kahrabaiya	Najaf
15:00				Stadium: Al-Najaf Stadium

=== Second legs ===
13 October 2012	Duhok	4–1	Naft Maysan	Duhok
15:00	Mohannad Abdul-Raheem 40', 53'; Osama Ali 43'; Jailton Nascimento de Oliveira 63'	Report	50'	Stadium: Zeravani Stadium; Referee: Nozad Salih

13 October 2012	Al-Sinaat Al-Kahrabaiya	2–3	Naft Al-Wasat	Taji
15:00				Stadium: Al-Taji Stadium

== Final phase ==
=== Bracket ===
Teams that are in bold advanced on.

**Round of 32**; First legs: 3 December 2012 – 2 June 2013; Second legs: 4–10 June 2013
Al-Shorta
Al-Kahrabaa
**Sulaymaniya (w/o)**	–	–	6
Kufa	–	–	0
**Kirkuk**	3	1	4
Al-Shirqat	0	2	2
**Zakho**	2	2	4
Al-Anbar	0	1	1
**Karbala (w/o)**	4	–	7
Al-Hindiya	0	–	0
Biladi	–	–	0
**Al-Sinaa (w/o)**	–	–	6
Al-Khutoot	0	–	0
**Baghdad (w/o)**	0	–	3
**Masafi Al-Wasat**	2	2	4
Naft Al-Wasat	1	2	3
Duhok
Al-Quwa Al-Jawiya
Al-Minaa
Erbil
**Al-Hudood**	3	1	4
Al-Karkh	1	0	1
Al-Diwaniya	0	–	0
**Naft Al-Junoob (w/o)**	1	–	4
**Al-Naft**	2	4	6
Al-Najda	1	0	1
Al-Hurr	–	–	0
**Al-Najaf (w/o)**	–	–	6
Al-Kadhimiya	1	0	1
**Ghaz Al-Shamal**	1	1	2
Al-Zawraa	0	1	1
**Al-Talaba**	0	3	3

**Round of 16**
Sulaymaniya
Kirkuk
Zakho
Karbala
Al-Sinaa
Baghdad
Masafi Al-Wasat
Al-Hudood
Naft Al-Junoob
Al-Naft
Al-Najaf
Ghaz Al-Shamal
Al-Talaba

**Quarter-finals**

**Semi-finals**

**Final**

== Round of 32 ==
=== First legs ===
3 December 2012	Al-Kadhimiya	1–1	Ghaz Al-Shamal	Baghdad
14:30				Stadium: Al-Kadhimiya Stadium

4 December 2012	Al-Hudood	3–1	Al-Karkh	Baghdad
14:30	Ahmed Ali Hussein; Hussein Hameed 32'		(Second half)	Stadium: Al-Naft Stadium; Referee: Faris Sami

4 December 2012	Al-Diwaniya	0–1	Naft Al-Junoob	Diwaniya
14:30			Basim Ali 89'	Stadium: Al-Diwaniya Stadium

4 December 2012	Karbala	4–0	Al-Hindiya	Karbala
14:30	Abbas Lafta 17', 61'; Wisam Tarki 71', 81'			Stadium: Karbala Stadium; Referee: Amir Hussein

4 December 2012	Al-Khutoot	0–0	Baghdad	Taji
14:30				Stadium: Al-Taji Stadium; Referee: Muhammad Najah

4 December 2012	Al-Zawraa	0–0	Al-Talaba	Baghdad
16:30				Stadium: Al-Shaab Stadium; Referee: Zayd Thamir

4 December 2012	Al-Shorta	Postponed	Al-Kahrabaa	Baghdad
16:30				Stadium: Al-Shorta Stadium

4 December 2012	Duhok	Postponed	Al-Quwa Al-Jawiya	Duhok
16:30				Stadium: Duhok Stadium

4 December 2012	Al-Minaa	Postponed	Erbil	Basra
16:30				Stadium: Al-Minaa Stadium

4 December 2012	Biladi	Postponed	Al-Sinaa	Baghdad
16:30

30 May 2013	Al-Naft	2–1	Al-Najda	Baghdad
16:30				Stadium: Al-Naft Stadium

30 May 2013	Masafi Al-Wasat	2–1	Naft Al-Wasat	Baghdad
16:30				Stadium: Masafi Al-Wasat Stadium

30 May 2013	Sulaymaniya	3–0 (w/o)	Al-Kufa	Sulaymaniya
16:30				Stadium: Sulaymaniya Stadium

30 May 2013	Al-Hurr	0–3 (w/o)	Al-Najaf	Karbala
16:30				Stadium: Karbala Stadium

31 May 2013	Zakho	2–0	Al-Anbar	Zakho
16:30	Younis Shakour 14', 15'			Stadium: Zakho Stadium; Referee: Zayd Thamir

2 June 2013	Kirkuk	3–0	Al-Shirqat	Kirkuk
16:30	Taha Ibrahim (o.g. 12); Mutaz Abd Al-Haseeb 40', 85'			Stadium: Kirkuk Olympic Stadium; Referee: Abd Al-Kadhim Hassan

=== Second legs ===
4 June 2013	Naft Al-Wasat	2–2	Masafi Al-Wasat	Najaf
16:30				Stadium: Al-Najaf Stadium

4 June 2013	Al-Anbar	1–2	Zakho	Zakho
16:30				Stadium: Zakho Stadium

10 June 2013	Al-Kahrabaa	Postponed	Al-Shorta	Baghdad
16:30				Stadium: Al-Naft Stadium

10 June 2013	Al-Quwa Al-Jawiya	Postponed	Duhok	Baghdad
16:30				Stadium: Al-Quwa Al-Jawiya Stadium

10 June 2013	Erbil	Postponed	Al-Minaa	Erbil
16:30				Stadium: Franso Hariri Stadium

10 June 2013	Al-Najaf	3–0 (w/o)	Al-Hurr	Najaf
16:30				Stadium: Al-Najaf Stadium

10 June 2013	Al-Kufa	0–3 (w/o)	Sulaymaniya	Kufa
16:30				Stadium: Al-Kufa Stadium

10 June 2013	Naft Al-Junoob	3–0 (w/o)	Al-Diwaniya	Basra
16:30				Stadium: Naft Al-Junoob Stadium

10 June 2013	Al-Hindiya	0–3 (w/o)	Karbala	Hindiya
16:30				Stadium: Al-Hindiya Stadium

10 June 2013	Al-Sinaa	3–0 (w/o)	Biladi	Baghdad
16:30				Stadium: Al-Sinaa Stadium

10 June 2013	Al-Karkh	0–1	Al-Hudood	Baghdad
16:30				Stadium: Al-Karkh Stadium

10 June 2013	Al-Najda	0–4	Al-Naft	Taji
16:30				Stadium: Al-Taji Stadium

10 June 2013	Ghaz Al-Shamal	1–0	Al-Kadhimiya	Kirkuk
16:30				Stadium: Ghaz Al-Shamal Stadium

10 June 2013	Baghdad	3–0 (w/o)	Al-Khutoot	Baghdad
16:30				Stadium: Baghdad Stadium

10 June 2013	Al-Shirqat	2–1	Kirkuk	Shirqat
16:30				Stadium: Al-Shirqat Stadium

10 June 2013	Al-Talaba	3–1	Al-Zawraa	Baghdad
17:30	Ali Faez Qasim 14'; Mustafa Jalal 46'; Bogy 88'		Emad Mohammed 80'	Stadium: Al-Shaab Stadium
