= 2020–21 Iraqi Women's Football League =

Iraqi Women's Football League
- Season: 2020–21
- Champions: Naft Al-Shamal (1st title)
- WAFF Clubs Championship: Naft Al-Shamal
- Matches: 12
- Goals: 40 (3.33 per match)
- Top goalscorer: Aylaf Hussamuddin

The 2020–21 Iraqi Women's Football League was the second season of the Iraqi Women's Football League, and the first since the 2015–16 campaign. The season started on 31 December 2020 and ended on 12 April 2021. Naft Al-Shamal were crowned champions of the league by winning all six of their games.

== Teams ==
Four teams participated in the competition: Biladi, Naft Al-Shamal, Fatat Nineveh and Shabab Al-Mustaqbal.

== League table ==
Pos	Team	Pld	W	D	L	GF	GA	GD	Pts	Qualification	NFT	NIN	BLD	SHB
1	Naft Al-Shamal	6	6	0	0	29	1	+28	18	2022 WAFF Women's Clubs Championship		7–1	4–0	3–0
2	Fatat Nineveh	6	2	1	3	6	14	−8	7		0–5		1–1	0–1
3	Biladi	6	1	2	3	3	14	−11	5		0–5	0–3		2–1
4	Shabab Al-Mustaqbal	6	1	1	4	2	11	−9	4		0–5	0–1	0–0	

Source: Iraqi Women's Football Site
Legend: Blue = home team win; Yellow = draw; Red = away team win.
Rules for classification: 1) Points, 2) Goal difference, 3) Goals scored

== Results ==
31 December 2020 1	Shabab Al-Mustaqbal	0–5	Naft Al-Shamal	Baghdad
14:00 UTC+03:00				Stadium: Sports Activities Stadium

16 January 2021 1	Biladi	0–3 (w/o)	Fatat Nineveh	Baghdad
				Stadium: Sports Activities Stadium
Note: Fatat Nineveh were awarded a walkover victory as Biladi did not turn up for the match.

23 January 2021 2	Shabab Al-Mustaqbal	0–1	Fatat Nineveh	Baghdad
			Nassir 90'	Stadium: Olympic Champion Stadium

27 January 2021 2	Naft Al-Shamal	4–0	Biladi	Baghdad
				Stadium: Sports Activities Stadium
Note: The match was ended before half-time as Biladi, who started the game with 8 players, had two players go off the field injured.

30 January 2021 3	Biladi	2–1	Shabab Al-Mustaqbal	Baghdad
			(pen.)

30 January 2021 3	Fatat Nineveh	0–5	Naft Al-Shamal	Baghdad
			Mahmood

13 February 2021 4	Fatat Nineveh	1–1	Biladi	Baghdad
11:00 UTC+03:00			Haifa	Stadium: Sports Activities Stadium

13 February 2021 4	Naft Al-Shamal	3–0	Shabab Al-Mustaqbal	Kirkuk
14:00 UTC+03:00				Stadium: Naft Al-Shamal Stadium

5 April 2021 5	Biladi	0–5	Naft Al-Shamal	Baghdad
13:00 UTC+03:00				Stadium: Academy Stadium; Referee: Hameed Wadi

5 April 2021 5	Fatat Nineveh	0–1	Shabab Al-Mustaqbal	Baghdad
15:00 UTC+03:00			Mohammed	Stadium: Academy Stadium; Referee: Abdul-Rahman Awf

12 April 2021 6	Shabab Al-Mustaqbal	0–0	Biladi	Baghdad
11:00 UTC+03:00				Stadium: Academy Stadium; Referee: Mahmoud Nadeem

12 April 2021 6	Naft Al-Shamal	7–1	Fatat Nineveh	Baghdad
13:00 UTC+03:00				Stadium: Al-Shaab Stadium; Referee: Ali Mutashar

== Awards ==
- Top scorer: Aylaf Hussamuddin (Naft Al-Shamal)
- Best Player/MVP: Zahra Haidar (Fatat Nineveh)
- Best Goalkeeper: Mariam Jawda (Shabab Al-Mustaqbal)

== See also ==
- 2020–21 Iraqi Premier League
- 2020–21 Iraq FA Cup
