= 2016–17 Iraq FA Cup =

Tournament details
- Country: Iraq
- Dates: 2 December 2016 – 22 August 2017
- Teams: 60

Final positions
- Champions: Al-Zawraa (15th title)
- Runners-up: Naft Al-Wasat

Tournament statistics
- Top goal scorer(s): Mustafa Karim (5 goals)

The 2016–17 Iraq FA Cup was the 28th edition of the Iraqi knockout football cup as a club competition, the main domestic cup in Iraqi football. A total of 19 teams from the Iraqi Premier League and 41 teams from the Iraqi First Division League participated. It started on 2 December 2016 and the final was played at Al-Sinaa Stadium in Baghdad on 22 August 2017 (the usual venue, Al-Shaab Stadium, was closed for renovation). It was the second Iraq FA Cup final to be held outside Al-Shaab Stadium, with the first being in 2003.

The winners of the competition were Al-Zawraa, who extended their record number of cup wins to 15 with a 1–0 victory over Naft Al-Wasat in the final thanks to a stoppage time goal by Alaa Abdul-Zahra.

== Format ==
=== Participation ===
The cup started with the first round, consisting of the 41 teams from the Iraqi First Division League, 40 of which played against each other and 1 of which automatically proceeded to the next round. The second round consisted of the 21 qualified teams from the first round, 18 of which played against each other and 3 of which automatically proceeded to the Round of 32. The 20 Iraqi Premier League clubs were to join the 12 qualified teams from the second round to form the Round of 32, but Erbil withdrew from the tournament and therefore First Division League side Al-Jinsiya were admitted into the Round of 32 to replace them despite already being knocked out.

The last cup competition saw almost half of the Premier League clubs withdraw from the tournament. To avoid this happening again, the Iraq FA announced that any Premier League team that withdrew would be fined and also deducted three points in the league. However, the Premier League had already finished by the time the Round of 16 came around, so teams who withdrew from that stage onwards faced no sanctions.

=== Cards ===
If a player received a second yellow card, they would be banned from the next cup match. If a player received a red card, they would be banned a minimum of one match, but more could be added by the Iraq Football Association.

=== No extra-time ===
The Iraq Football Association decided that from the Round of 16 onwards, there would not be an extra time period for matches that end in a draw; instead the game would go straight to a penalty shootout.

== Participating clubs ==
The following 60 teams participated in the competition:

**Iraqi Premier League**; 19 clubs from the 2016–17 season	**Iraqi First Division League**; 41 clubs from the 2016–17 season
Al-Bahri; Al-Hudood; Al-Hussein; Al-Kahrabaa; Al-Karkh; Al-Minaa; Al-Naft; Al-Najaf; Al-Quwa Al-Jawiya; Al-Samawa; Al-Shorta; Al-Talaba; **Al-Zawraa**; Amanat Baghdad; Karbala; Naft Al-Junoob; Naft Al-Wasat; Naft Maysan; Zakho	Abu Ghraib; Al-Alam; Al-Atheer; Al-Difaa Al-Madani; Al-Diwan; Al-Etisalat; Al-Ghadhriya; Al-Hurr; Al-Iraq; Al-Iskan; Al-Jaish; Al-Jamahir; Al-Jinsiya; Al-Kadhimiya; Al-Khutoot; Al-Kufa; Al-Maslaha; Al-Mohandessin; Al-Najda; Al-Rusafa; Al-Saha; Al-Shabab; Al-Sinaa; Al-Sinaat Al-Kahrabaiya; Al-Siyaha; Al-Taji; Al-Tarmiya; Badr Al-Iraq; Balad; Biladi; Brayati; Ghaz Al-Shamal; Haifa; Jisr Diyala; Peshmerga Sulaymaniya; Salahaddin; Samarra; Shabab Al-Adil; Shabab Al-Dawr; Shabab Al-Meshahda; Tuz

- **Bold** indicates the team is still in the competition.

== Schedule ==
The rounds of the 2016–17 competition were scheduled as follows:

Round	Draw date and time	Matches dates
First round	8 November 2016	2–5 December 2016
Second round	8 November 2016	9–11 December 2016
Round of 32	7 March 2017	26–31 March 2017
Round of 16	7 March 2017	14 August 2017
Quarter-finals	7 March 2017	17 August 2017
Semi-finals	7 March 2017	20 August 2017
Final	7 March 2017	22 August 2017

== First round ==
40 teams from the Iraqi First Division League compete in this round, and 1 First Division League team (Badr Al-Iraq) is automatically placed into the second round.

2 December 2016	Al-Jamahir	0–3	Al-Siyaha
			60' Adil; 73' Fawzi; 79' Adnan

2 December 2016	Al-Difaa Al-Madani	0–2	Al-Kadhimiya
			25', 49' Abdul-Kadhim

2 December 2016	Balad	0–1	Al-Iraq
			71' Saleh

2 December 2016	Al-Diwan	0–2	Al-Najda
			20', 82' Qasim

2 December 2016	Abu Ghraib	0–1	Al-Khutoot
			78' Saad

2 December 2016	Al-Iskan	0–5	Al-Jaish
			8' Ali; 14' Ali Dayikh; 23' Yaseen; 67', 87' Ali Salah

2 December 2016	Al-Tarmiya	0–0 (a.e.t.) (3–2 p)	Al-Alam

2 December 2016	Shabab Al-Adil	2–0	Shabab Al-Meshahda
	Abdul-Zahra 9'; Shakir 13'

2 December 2016	Al-Saha	4–3	Shabab Al-Dawr
			Ibrahim; Obeida

2 December 2016	Samarra	7–1	Jisr Diyala
	Salah 6', 7'; Alaa 64', 67'; Tamateh 70'; Ghalib 75'; Ayoub 81'		Salah

2 December 2016	Al-Maslaha	1–0	Al-Rusafa
	Khalaf

2 December 2016	Al-Etisalat	1–2	Al-Sinaat Al-Kahrabaiya
	Salman 37' (pen.)		16', 74' Tamuh; (yellow card) (yellow-red card) Hussain

2 December 2016	Al-Taji	1–1 (a.e.t.) (5–3 p)	Al-Ghadhriya
	Rashid		Bouti

2 December 2016	Al-Hurr	1–0	Tuz
	Hussein 65'

2 December 2016	Peshmerga Sulaymaniya	1–0	Al-Jinsiya
Note: Despite losing the game, Al-Jinsiya were admitted into the round of 32 to replace the withdrawing Erbil.

2 December 2016	Salahaddin	2–1	Al-Mohandessin
	Younis 1'; Mahmoud 52' (pen.)		Khudhair 47'

2 December 2016	Ghaz Al-Shamal	1–1 (a.e.t.) (8–7 p)	Al-Kufa

2 December 2016	Biladi	3–3 (a.e.t.) (4–5 p)	Al-Atheer
			Ghalib; Allawi; Hussain

5 December 2016	Al-Shabab	0–1	Haifa
Note: Al-Shabab were a late replacement for Al-Mithaq who were unable to compete in the tournament.

5 December 2016	Al-Sinaa	3–0 (w/o)	Brayati

== Second round ==
18 of the 21 qualified teams from the previous round compete in this round, while 4 teams (Al-Siyaha, Al-Kadhimiya, Al-Maslaha and Al-Jinsiya) are automatically placed into the Round of 32. Although Al-Jinsiya were knocked out in the first round, they were chosen to replace Erbil who withdrew from the tournament.

9 December 2016	Al-Iraq	0–2	Al-Najda
			64' Jameel; 77' Tariq

9 December 2016	Al-Khutoot	0–1	Al-Jaish

9 December 2016	Al-Tarmiya	1–0	Shabab Al-Adil

9 December 2016	Al-Saha	0–2	Samarra
			10' Tamateh; 90+2' Ali

9 December 2016	Al-Hurr	3–0 (w/o)	Peshmerga Sulaymaniya

9 December 2016	Al-Atheer	3–3 (a.e.t.) (4–5 p)	Badr Al-Iraq

10 December 2016	Haifa	0–4	Al-Sinaat Al-Kahrabaiya
			51', 68' Jassim; 86' Muegel; 90' Jasem

11 December 2016	Al-Sinaa	1–0	Al-Taji

11 December 2016	Salahaddin	0–0 (a.e.t.) (9–10 p)	Ghaz Al-Shamal

== Final phase ==
=== Bracket ===
Round of 32; 26–31 March 2017
Al-Shorta	1
Al-Jaish	3
Zakho	1
Al-Hudood	3
Al-Hussein	1 (4)
Al-Hurr (p)	1 (5)
Al-Minaa	4
Al-Sinaat Al-Kahrabaiya	1
Naft Al-Wasat	1
Ghaz Al-Shamal	0
Karbala	2
Al-Bahri	1
Al-Jinsiya	0
Al-Najda	1
Al-Talaba	2
Al-Kadhimiya	0
Al-Zawraa	4
Al-Maslaha	3
Naft Al-Junoob	4
Al-Karkh	0
Naft Maysan	5
Al-Siyaha	1
Al-Naft	2
Al-Sinaa	3
Amanat Baghdad	5
Badr Al-Iraq	0
Al-Samawa	1
Al-Najaf	3
Al-Kahrabaa	2
Samarra	1
Al-Quwa Al-Jawiya	2
Al-Tarmiya	0

Round of 16; 14 August 2017
Al-Jaish	0
Al-Hudood (w/o)	3
Al-Hurr	0 (3)
Al-Minaa (p)	0 (4)
Naft Al-Wasat (w/o)	3
Karbala	0
Al-Najda	1
Al-Talaba	3
Al-Zawraa	1
Naft Al-Junoob	0
Naft Maysan (w/o)	3
Al-Sinaa	0
Amanat Baghdad (w/o)	3
Al-Najaf	0
Al-Kahrabaa	0
Al-Quwa Al-Jawiya	2

Quarter-finals; 17 August 2017
Al-Hudood	0
Al-Minaa (w/o)	3
Naft Al-Wasat (w/o)	3
Al-Talaba	0
Al-Zawraa	2
Naft Maysan	0
Amanat Baghdad	1
Al-Quwa Al-Jawiya	0

Semi-finals; 20 August 2017
Al-Minaa	1 (3)
Naft Al-Wasat (p)	1 (4)
Al-Zawraa	3
Amanat Baghdad	1

Final; 22 August 2017
Naft Al-Wasat	0
Al-Zawraa	1

== Round of 32 ==
26 March 2017	Zakho	1–3	Al-Hudood

26 March 2017	Al-Hussein	1–1 (a.e.t.) (4–5 p)	Al-Hurr

26 March 2017	Naft Al-Wasat	1–0	Ghaz Al-Shamal

26 March 2017	Al-Jinsiya	0–1	Al-Najda

26 March 2017	Al-Talaba	2–0	Al-Kadhimiya

26 March 2017	Al-Samawa	1–3	Al-Najaf

27 March 2017	Al-Shorta	1–3	Al-Jaish
	Tariq 45+5'		36' Ahmed; 57' Falah; 77' Abdullah

27 March 2017	Karbala	2–1	Al-Bahri

27 March 2017	Naft Maysan	5–1	Al-Siyaha

27 March 2017	Al-Naft	2–3	Al-Sinaa
	Jawda; Dawood		Tariq

27 March 2017	Amanat Baghdad	5–0	Badr Al-Iraq

27 March 2017	Al-Quwa Al-Jawiya	2–0	Al-Tarmiya

28 March 2017	Al-Zawraa	4–3	Al-Maslaha
	Karim 20', 31'; Ali 45'; H. Abdul-Amir 74'		25' Thajel; 45' Al-Abdeen; 90' Tah	Referee: Muntaser Ghazi

28 March 2017	Al-Kahrabaa	2–1	Samarra

30 March 2017	Al-Minaa	4–1	Al-Sinaat Al-Kahrabaiya

31 March 2017	Naft Al-Junoob	4–0	Al-Karkh

== Round of 16 ==
14 August 2017	Al-Jaish	0–3 (w/o)	Al-Hudood

14 August 2017	Al-Hurr	0–0 (3–4 p)	Al-Minaa

14 August 2017	Naft Al-Wasat	3–0 (w/o)	Karbala

14 August 2017	Al-Najda	1–3	Al-Talaba
			Koné; Al-Ameen; Yaseen

14 August 2017	Al-Zawraa	1–0	Naft Al-Junoob
	H. Abdul-Amir 73'

14 August 2017	Naft Maysan	3–0 (w/o)	Al-Sinaa

14 August 2017	Amanat Baghdad	3–0 (w/o)	Al-Najaf

14 August 2017	Al-Kahrabaa	0–2	Al-Quwa Al-Jawiya
			33' Jaffal; 52' Radhi

== Quarter-finals ==
17 August 2017	Al-Hudood	0–3 (w/o)	Al-Minaa

17 August 2017	Naft Al-Wasat	3–0 (w/o)	Al-Talaba

17 August 2017	Al-Zawraa	2–0	Naft Maysan
	Karim 5'; Kalaf 76'

17 August 2017	Amanat Baghdad	1–0	Al-Quwa Al-Jawiya
	A. Abdul-Amir 11' (pen.); Muhammad (red card) 44'

== Semi-finals ==
20 August 2017	Al-Minaa	1–1 (3–4 p)	Naft Al-Wasat	Najaf
	Husni 68'		50' Attwan	Stadium: Naft Al-Wasat Stadium

20 August 2017	Al-Zawraa	3–1	Amanat Baghdad	Baghdad
	Karim 6', 29'; H. Abdul-Amir 35'		20' (pen.) A. Abdul-Amir	Stadium: Amanat Baghdad Stadium

== Final ==
22 August 2017	Naft Al-Wasat	0–1	Al-Zawraa	Baghdad
16:30 BGD			90+5' Abdul-Zahra	Stadium: Al-Sinaa Stadium

Iraq FA Cup
2016–17 winner
Al-Zawraa
15th title
