= Iraqi Women's Football League =

- Founded: 2016
- Country: Iraq
- Confederation: AFC
- Number of clubs: 7 (since 2023–24)
- International cup: WAFF Women's Clubs Championship
- Current champions: Al-Quwa Al-Jawiya (1st title) (2023–24)
- Most championships: Ghaz Al-Shamal; Naft Al-Shamal; Al-Quwa Al-Jawiya (1 title each)

The Iraqi Women's Football League (Arabic: الدوري العراقي للسيدات) is the league competition for women's football in Iraq. It is run by the Iraq Football Association and was first played in the 2015–16 season. The league currently consists of seven teams.

The current champions are Al-Quwa Al-Jawiya, who won their first title in the 2023–24 season.

== List of champions ==
Year	Champions	Runners-up	Third place	Fourth place
2015–16	Ghaz Al-Shamal	Zeravani	Al-Quwa Al-Jawiya	Biladi
2016–20	Competition not held			
2020–21	Naft Al-Shamal	Fatat Nineveh	Biladi	Shabab Al-Mustaqbal
2021–23	Competition not held			
2023–24	Al-Quwa Al-Jawiya	Naft Al-Shamal	Al Bdeir	Amanat Baghdad

== See also ==
- AFC Women's Club Championship
- Women's football in Iraq
- Iraq women's national football team
