= 2017 Iraq FA Cup final =

- Event: 2016–17 Iraq FA Cup
Al-Zawraa	Naft Al-Wasat
1	0
- Date: 22 August 2017
- Venue: Al-Sinaa Stadium, Baghdad
- Referee: Mohanad Qasim
- Attendance: 10,000

The 2017 Iraq FA Cup final was the 26th final of the Iraq FA Cup as a club competition. The match was contested between Al-Zawraa and Naft Al-Wasat, at Al-Sinaa Stadium in Baghdad. It was played on 22 August 2017 to be the final match of the competition.

Al-Zawraa made their record 17th appearance in the Iraq FA Cup final while Naft Al-Wasat, based in Najaf, became the first ever team from outside Baghdad to reach the final. Al-Zawraa won the match 1–0 with a stoppage time goal from Alaa Abdul-Zahra, for the club's record 15th title.

The winners of the cup, Al-Zawraa, qualified for the 2018 AFC Cup as well as the 2017 Iraqi Super Cup.

== Route to the Final ==
Note: In all results below, the score of the finalist is given first (H: home; A: away).

Al-Zawraa		Round	Naft Al-Wasat	
Opponent	Result	2016–17 Iraq FA Cup	Opponent	Result
Al-Maslaha	4–3 (H)	Round of 32	Ghaz Al-Shamal	1–0 (H)
Naft Al-Junoob	1–0 (H)	Round of 16	Karbala	Walkover
Naft Maysan	2–0 (H)	Quarter-finals	Al-Talaba	Walkover
Amanat Baghdad	3–1 (A)	Semi-finals	Al-Minaa	1–1 (4–3 p.) (H)

== Match ==
=== Details ===
22 August 2017
16:30 UTC+03:00

Al-Zawraa	1–0	Naft Al-Wasat
Abdul-Zahra 90+4'

Al-Sinaa Stadium, Baghdad
Attendance: 10,000
Referee: Mohanad Qasim

Al-Zawraa	Naft Al-Wasat

GK	20	(Iraq) Alaa Gatea
RB	14	(Iraq) Haidar Abdul-Amir (c)
CB	6	(Iraq) Karrar Mohammed
CB	29	(Iraq) Abbas Qasim
LB	3	(Syria) Hussein Jwayed
RM	33	(Iraq) Mustafa Hussein		(substituted off) 53'
CM	7	(Iraq) Ahmad Fadhel		(substituted off) 80'
CM	25	(Iraq) Ali Raheem	(yellow card) 64'
LM	9	(Iraq) Hussein Ali
CF	11	(Iraq) Luay Salah
CF	24	(Iraq) Mustafa Karim		(substituted off) 59'
Substitutions:
FW	4	(Iraq) Amjad Kalaf		(substituted on) 53'
FW	10	(Iraq) Alaa Abdul-Zahra	(yellow card) 86'	(substituted on) 59'
MF	5	(Iraq) Safaa Hadi		(substituted on) 80'
Manager:
(Iraq) Essam Hamad

GK	12	(Iraq) Jalal Hassan
RB	19	(Iraq) Mohammed Noumi
CB	5	(Iraq) Nabeel Abbas (c)
CB	13	(Iraq) Saad Attiya		(substituted off) 54'
LB	14	(Syria) Ayad Khalaf
RM	29	(Iraq) Barzan Shirzad		(substituted off) 90+3'
CM	11	(Iraq) Amjad Attwan
CM	20	(Iraq) Ahmed Jabbar	(yellow card) 45+1'
LM	8	(Iraq) Ibrahim Bayesh	(yellow card) 45+1'
AM	7	(Iraq) Salih Sadir
CF	33	(Iraq) Ziyad Ahmed		(substituted off) 66'
Substitutions:
DF	32	(Iraq) Niaz Mohammed		(substituted on) 54'
FW	39	(Iraq) Farhan Shakor		(substituted on) 66'
MF	6	(Iraq) Faris Hassoun		(substituted on) 90+3'
Manager:
(Iraq) Ali Hashim

Assistant referees:
Akram Ali
Maitham Khamat
Fourth official:
Yousef Saeed

Match rules

- 90 minutes.
- Penalty shoot-out if scores still level.
- Seven named substitutes, of which up to three may be used.
