= 2023 Iraq FA Cup final =

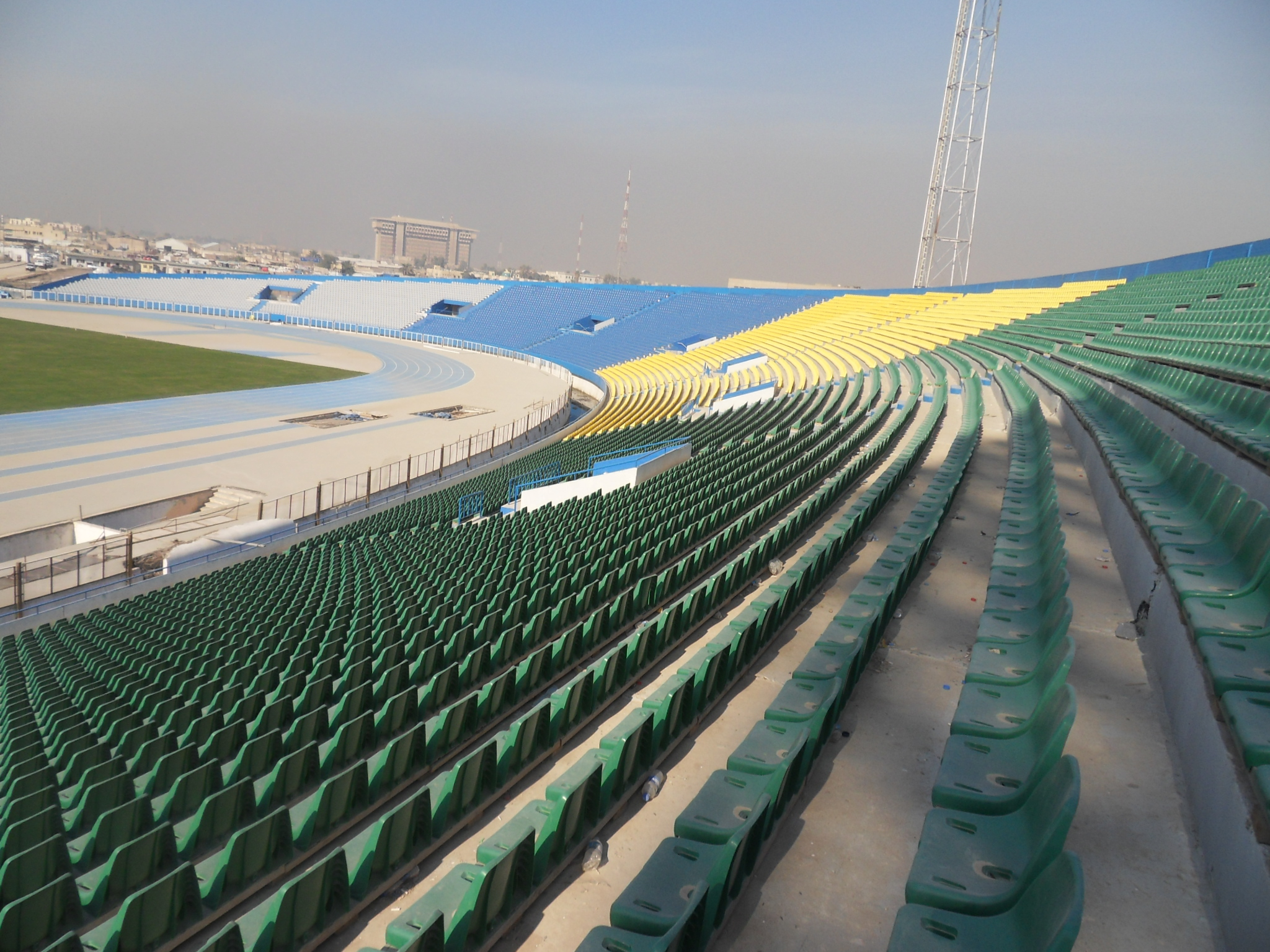
- The match took place at Al-Shaab Stadium
- Event: 2022–23 Iraq FA Cup
Al-Quwa Al-Jawiya	Erbil
1	0
- Date: 5 August 2023
- Venue: Al-Shaab Stadium, Baghdad
- Referee: Zaid Thamer Mohammed

The 2023 Iraq FA Cup final was the 30th final of the Iraq FA Cup as a club competition. The match was contested between Al-Quwa Al-Jawiya and Erbil, at Al-Shaab Stadium in Baghdad. It was played on 5 August 2023 to be the final match of the competition. Al-Quwa Al-Jawiya made their ninth appearance in the Iraq FA Cup final while Erbil made their first appearance.

Al-Quwa Al-Jawiya won the match 1–0 with a goal from Mohannad Abdul-Raheem to earn their sixth Iraq FA Cup title.

== Route to the Final ==
Note: In all results below, the score of the finalist is given first (H: home; A: away; N: neutral).

Al-Quwa Al-Jawiya		Round	Erbil	
Opponent	Result	2022–23 Iraq FA Cup	Opponent	Result
Al-Hurr	2–0 (A)	Round of 32	Al-Samawa	1–1 (6–5 p.) (A)
Al-Shorta	1–1 (7–6 p.) (H)	Round of 16	Naft Al-Wasat	2–1
Al-Zawraa	1–1 (3–2 p.) (A)	Quarter-finals	Al-Bahri	3–0 (w/o) (H)
Al-Karkh	3–1 (N)	Semi-finals	Al-Hudood	1–0 (N)

== Match ==
=== Details ===
5 August 2023
20:00 UTC+03:00

Al-Quwa Al-Jawiya	1–0	Erbil
Abdul-Raheem 29'

Al-Shaab Stadium, Baghdad
Referee: Zaid Thamer Mohammed

Al-Quwa Al-Jawiya	Erbil

GK	20	(Iraq) Mohammed Hameed
RB	8	(Iraq) Ibrahim Bayesh (c)
CB	66	(Iraq) Mohammed Al-Baqer
CB	48	(Iraq) Ruslan Hanoon
LB	3	(Iraq) Hamza Adnan
CM	6	(Iraq) Ali Mohsin
CM	13	(Togo) Franco Atchou
RM	19	(Iraq) Mohammed Qasim	(substituted off) 66'
AM	16	(Iraq) Karrar Nabeel	(substituted off) 75'
LM	14	(Iraq) Hussein Jabbar	(substituted off) 85'
CF	88	(Iraq) Mohannad Abdul-Raheem	(substituted off) 75'
Substitutions:
GK	12	(Iraq) Mohammed Shakir
GK	33	(Iraq) Mustafa Bassim
DF	5	(Tunisia) Ghaith Maaroufi	(substituted on) 75'
DF	23	(Iraq) Kadhim Raad
DF	44	(Iraq) Hammoud Mishaan
MF	25	(Iraq) Mohammed Ali Abbood	(substituted on) 85'
FW	7	(Iraq) Shareef Abdul-Kadhim	(substituted on) 66'
FW	9	(Iraq) Montader Abdel Amir
FW	35	(Democratic Republic of the Congo) Chris Mugalu	(substituted on) 75'
Manager:
(Egypt) Moamen Soliman

GK	22	(Iraq) Hussein Joli
RB	77	(Iraq) Halo Fayaq
CB	30	(Iraq) Ahmad Ibrahim (c)	(yellow card) 46'
CB	99	(Iraq) Omar Jengi		(substituted off) 82'
LB	3	(Iraq) Hassan Ashour
CM	8	(Iraq) Akam Hashim	(yellow card) 90'
CM	13	(Iraq) Ali Shakhwan
RM	36	(Iraq) Mohammed Mohsen		(substituted off) 46'
AM	33	(Uganda) Emmanuel Okwi		(substituted off) 72'
LM	96	(Iraq) Sherko Karim
CF	90	(Iraq) Mahmoud Khalil		(substituted off) 86'
Substitutions:
GK	1	(Iraq) Rebaz Abdullah
DF	31	(Iraq) Herdi Siamand
DF	4	(Brazil) Hélio
MF	6	(Iraq) Jassim Mohammed		(substituted on) 72'
MF	21	(Iraq) Mohammed Saleh
MF	27	(Iraq) Rawa Yousif		(substituted on) 46'
FW	11	(Iraq) Amjad Radhi		(substituted on) 82'
FW	15	(Iraq) Abdulqader Ayoub		(substituted on) 86'
FW	29	(Iraq) Barzan Sherzad
Manager:
(Iraq) Abbas Obeid

Assistant referees:
Wathik Mdallal Obaid Al-Swaiedi
Ahmed Sabah
Fourth official:
Salem Amer

Match rules

- 90 minutes.
- Penalty shoot-out if scores still level.
- Nine named substitutes, of which up to five may be used.
