= 2023–24 Iraqi Women's Football League =

Iraqi Women's Football League
- Season: 2023–24
- Dates: 24 November 2023 – 2 May 2024
- Champions: Al-Quwa Al-Jawiya (1st title)
- Matches: 30
- Goals: 141 (4.7 per match)
- Top goalscorer: Zainab Abbas; Aylaf Hussamuddin (11 goals each)

The 2023–24 Iraqi Women's Football League was the third season of the Iraqi Women's Football League, and the first since the 2020–21 season. Seven teams started the competition, but Fatat Nineveh withdrew after one match, leaving six teams remaining. The season started on 24 November 2023 and ended on 2 May 2024.

Al-Quwa Al-Jawiya were crowned champions of the league for the first time, winning all ten of their matches.

== League table ==
Pos	Team	Pld	W	D	L	GF	GA	GD	Pts	QWJ	NSH	BDR	AMN	FBG	SHB	FNI
1	Al-Quwa Al-Jawiya (C)	10	10	0	0	54	6	+48	30		2–1	3–0 (Note: The Al-Quwa Al-Jawiya–Al Bdeir match was awarded as a 3–0 win to Al-Quwa Al-Jawiya, as Al Bdeir did not turn up for the game.)	5–0	12–0	7–0	
2	Naft Al-Shamal	10	8	0	2	41	11	+30	24	3–4		3–0	4–1	6–0	3–0 (Note: The Naft Al-Shamal–Shahraban match was awarded as a 3–0 win to Naft Al-Shamal, as Shahraban did not turn up for the game.)	
3	Al Bdeir	10	4	1	5	14	20	−6	13	0–3	2–4		2–1	2–0	3–0 (Note: The Al Bdeir–Shahraban match was awarded as a 3–0 win to Al Bdeir, as Shahraban did not turn up for the game.)	
4	Amanat Baghdad	10	3	2	5	21	35	−14	11	2–10	2–8	3–3		3–0 (Note: The Amanat Baghdad–Fatat Baghdad match was awarded as a 3–0 win to Amanat Baghdad, as Fatat Baghdad did not turn up for the game.)	1–1	
5	Fatat Baghdad	10	2	1	7	9	35	−26	7	0–3	0–3	3–0 (Note: The Fatat Baghdad–Al Bdeir match was awarded as a 3–0 win to Fatat Baghdad, as Al Bdeir did not turn up for the game.)	2–5		1–1	
6	Shahraban	10	0	2	8	2	34	−32	2	0–5 (Note: The Shahraban–Al-Quwa Al-Jawiya match was ended early with the score at 5–0 to Al-Quwa Al-Jawiya after Shahraban withdrew from the game with only 7 players on the field.)	0–6	0–2	0–3 (Note: The Shahraban–Amanat Baghdad match was awarded as a 3–0 win to Amanat Baghdad, as Shahraban did not turn up for the game.)	0–3		(Note: The Shahraban–Fatat Nineveh match ended in a 3–0 win for Shahraban but the result was annulled after Fatat Nineveh withdrew from the league.)
7	Fatat Nineveh (Note: Fatat Nineveh withdrew from the league after playing one match, and the result was annulled.)	0	0	0	0	0	0	0	0							

Source: Iraq Football Association
Legend: Blue = home team win; Yellow = draw; Red = away team win.
Rules for classification: 1) points; 2) head-to-head points; 3) head-to-head goal difference; 4) goal difference; 5) number of wins; 6) number of goals scored.
(C) Champions

== Top scorers ==
Rank	Player	Club	Goals
1	(Iraq) Zainab Abbas	Al-Quwa Al-Jawiya	11
1	(Iraq) Aylaf Hussamuddin	Al-Quwa Al-Jawiya	11
3	(Iraq) Nadia Fadhel	Al-Quwa Al-Jawiya	9

== See also ==
- 2023–24 Iraq Stars League
- 2023–24 Iraq FA Cup
