= Al-Anbar SC =

Iraqi football club

- Full name: Al-Anbar Sport Club
- Founded: 1987; 39 years ago
- Ground: Al-Anbar Stadium
- Chairman: Mahmoud Fadhel Hazeem
- Manager: Atta Hassan
- League: Iraqi Third Division League
| Home colours | Away colours |

Al-Anbar Sport Club (Arabic: نادي الأنبار الرياضي), is an Iraqi football team based in Al-Anbar, that plays in Iraqi Third Division League.

== Managerial history ==
- (Iraq) Khamis Humoud
- (Iraq) Atta Hassan

== See also ==
- 2001–02 Iraq FA Cup
- 2002–03 Iraq FA Cup
- 2012–13 Iraq FA Cup
