= José Henríquez =

Salvadoran footballer (born 1987)

José Mardoqueo Henríquez
Personal information
- Full name: José Mardoqueo Henríquez Dubón
- Date of birth: May 24, 1987 (age 39)
- Place of birth: Jutiapa, El Salvador
- Height: 1.78 m (5 ft 10 in)
- Position: Defender

Team information
- Current team: Zeravani

Youth career
- 2004: El Roble

Senior career*
Years	Team	Apps	(Gls)
2004–2011	FAS		
2011–2013	Águila	67	(6)
2014–?	Zeravani	?	(?)

International career^{‡}
2006–2013	El Salvador	33	(0)
- * Club domestic league appearances and goals as of July 29, 2011 ‡ National team caps and goals as of January 23, 2011

José Mardoqueo Henríquez Dubón (born May 24, 1987) is a Salvadoran former footballer. He was banned for life in 2013, for match-fixing while playing for the El Salvador national football team. He then played for Zeravani SC in the Iraqi Premier League, as that league is not governed by FIFA.

== Club career ==
After coming through at Salvadoran second division side El Roble, Henríquez would go on to play in the first division for FAS for almost 7 years, dating back to September 2004 when he made his FAS debut against Municipal from Guatemala. In mid-2011, Henríquez left FAS and signed a two-year contract with Águila starting with the 2011/12 season. In July 2013 returned to Águila signing for 4 years.

In September 2014, Henriquez and his fellow banned Salvadoran teammate Cristian Castillo joined Zeravani SC in the Iraqi Premier League, where they could play despite the ban as the league was not recognized by FIFA. Another fellow banned Salvadoran teammate Ramón Sánchez subsequently joined Zakho FC, the former club of fellow Salvadoran teammate Josué Flores, which also plays in the Iraqi Premier League.

== International career ==
Henríquez made his debut for El Salvador in an October 2006 friendly match against Panama and represented his country at the 2007 and 2009 and 2013 CONCACAF Gold Cup CONCACAF Gold Cups, in addition to six 2010 FIFA World Cup qualifying games for Los Cuscatlecos.

On September 20, 2013, Henríquez was one of 14 Salvadoran players banned for life due to their involvement with match fixing.
