= 2022 WAFF Women's Clubs Championship =

بطولة اتحاد غرب آسيا الثانية لأندية السيدات

Tournament details
- Host country: Jordan
- City: Zarqa
- Dates: 14–20 July
- Teams: 4 (from 1 sub-confederation)
- Venue: 1 (in 1 host city)

Final positions
- Champions: (Lebanon) Safa (1st title)
- Runners-up: (Jordan) Orthodox
- Third place: (Iraq) Naft Al-Shamal
- Fourth place: (Syria) Fairooza

Tournament statistics
- Matches played: 8
- Goals scored: 15 (1.88 per match)
- Attendance: 1,750 (219 per match)
- Top scorer(s): (Lebanon) Yara Bou Rada (Lebanon) Lea Hachem (Jordan) Haya Khalil (2 goals each)
- Best player: (Jordan) Shahnaz Jebreen
- Best goalkeeper: (Iraq) Faeza Mahmood

The 2022 WAFF Women's Clubs Championship was the second edition of the WAFF Women's Clubs Championship, the West Asian women's club football championship organised by the WAFF.

Initially scheduled to be played from 10 to 20 December 2020, the tournament was postponed because of the COVID-19 pandemic. The tournament was then rescheduled to December 2021, before being finally moved to July 2022. It took place at the Prince Mohammed Stadium in Zarqa, Jordan.

Safa of Lebanon won their first title, after beating Orthodox of Jordan 3–1 in the final.

== Teams ==
Four teams participated in the tournament. The draw was held on 3 July 2022, in Amman, Jordan. Abu Dhabi of the United Arab Emirates were due to participate, but withdrew on 14 July.

Association	Team	Appearance	Previous best performance
Iraq	Naft Al-Shamal	1st	Debut
Jordan	Orthodox	1st	Debut
Lebanon	Safa	1st	Debut
Syria	Fairooza	1st	Debut

== League table ==
Pos	Team	Pld	W	D	L	GF	GA	GD	Pts	Qualification
1	(Jordan) Orthodox (H)	3	2	1	0	5	1	+4	7	Advance to final
2	(Lebanon) Safa	3	1	2	0	4	1	+3	5	Advance to final
3	(Iraq) Naft Al-Shamal	3	1	1	1	1	1	0	4	Advance to third place play-off
4	(Syria) Fairooza	3	0	0	3	0	7	−7	0	Advance to third place play-off

Source: Global Sports Archive
Rules for classification: Group stage tiebreakers
(H) Hosts
14 July 2022
17:00

Naft Al-Shamal (Iraq)	1–0	(Syria) Fairooza
Mulla Bakr 13'	Report

Prince Mohammed Stadium, Zarqa
Attendance: 200
Referee: Doumouh Al Bakkar (Lebanon)
14 July 2022
20:00

Orthodox (Jordan)	1–1	(Lebanon) Safa
Al Zagha 6'	Report	Bou Rada 34'

Prince Mohammed Stadium, Zarqa
Attendance: 100
Referee: hmed Kadhim Gatea (Iraq)

16 July 2022
17:00

Safa (Lebanon)	0–0	(Iraq) Naft Al-Shamal
	Report

Prince Mohammed Stadium, Zarqa
Attendance: 150
Referee: Haneen Murad (Jordan)
16 July 2022
20:00

Fairooza (Syria)	0–3	(Jordan) Orthodox
	Report	Yassen 3'; Al Bargouthy 21'; Khalil 87'

Prince Mohammed Stadium, Zarqa
Attendance: 300
Referee: Khuloud Khudoum Al Zaabi (United Arab Emirates)

18 July 2022
17:00

Fairooza (Syria)	0–3	(Lebanon) Safa
	Report	Kishly 45+3'; Abdin 73'; Hachem 83'

Prince Mohammed Stadium, Zarqa
Attendance: 200
Referee: Ahmed Kadhim Gatea (Iraq)
18 July 2022
20:00

Orthodox (Jordan)	1–0	(Iraq) Naft Al-Shamal
Khalil 90+4'	Report

Prince Mohammed Stadium, Zarqa
Attendance: 300
Referee: Muath Owfi (Palestine)

== Third place play-off ==
20 July 2022
17:00

Naft Al-Shamal (Iraq)	1–0	(Syria) Fairooza
Al-Ghazawi 53'	Report

Prince Mohammed Stadium, Zarqa
Attendance: 200
Referee: Doumouh Al Bakkar (Lebanon)

== Final ==
20 July 2022
20:00

Orthodox (Jordan)	1–3	(Lebanon) Safa
Jebreen 40'	Report	Bou Rada 12'; Saad 46'; Hachem 80'

Prince Mohammed Stadium, Zarqa
Attendance: 300
Referee: Ahmed Kadhim Gatea (Iraq)

== Player awards ==
The following awards were given at the conclusion of the tournament:

Top Goalscorers	Best Player	Best Goalkeeper
(Lebanon) Yara Bou Rada (Safa) (Lebanon) Lea Hachem (Safa) (Jordan) Haya Khalil (Orthodox)	(Jordan) Shahnaz Jebreen (Orthodox)	(Iraq) Faeza Mahmood (Naft Al-Shamal)

== Goalscorers ==
Team eliminated / inactive for this round.

Rank	Player	Team	MD1	MD2	MD3	3RD	FNL	Total
1	(Lebanon) Yara Bou Rada	(Lebanon) Safa	1				1	2
1	(Lebanon) Lea Hachem	(Lebanon) Safa			1		1	2
1	(Jordan) Haya Khalil	(Jordan) Orthodox		1	1			2
2	(Lebanon) Lama Abdin	(Lebanon) Safa			1			1
2	(Jordan) Tala Al Bargouthy	(Jordan) Orthodox		1				1
2	(Iraq) Tabrek Al-Ghazawi	(Iraq) Naft Al-Shamal				1		1
2	(Jordan) Shahnaz Jebreen	(Jordan) Orthodox					1	1
2	(Lebanon) Nour Kishly	(Lebanon) Safa			1			1
2	(Iraq) Direen Mulla Bakr	(Iraq) Naft Al-Shamal	1					1
2	(Lebanon) Anji Saad	(Lebanon) Safa					1	1
2	(Jordan) Rima Yassen	(Jordan) Orthodox		1				1
2	(Jordan) Razan Al Zagha	(Jordan) Orthodox	1					1

== Awards ==
The following awards were given at the conclusion of the tournament:

- Best Player: (Jordan) Shahnaz Jebreen (Orthodox)
- Top Scorer: (Lebanon) Yara Bou Rada (Safa), (Lebanon) Lea Hachem (Safa), and (Jordan) Haya Khalil (Orthodox) (2 goals each)
- Best Goalkeeper: (Iraq) Faiza Mahmoud (Naft Al-Shamal)

== See also ==
- 2022 AFC Women's Club Championship
