= Yara Bou Rada =

Lebanese footballer (born 2000)

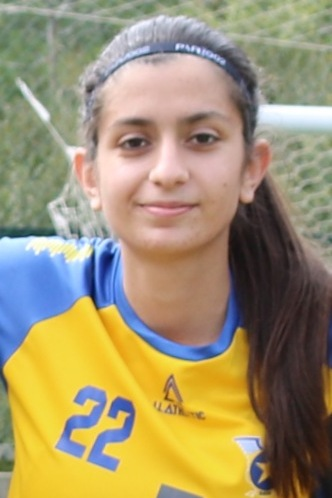
- Bou Rada with Safa in 2021

Personal information
- Full name: Yara Antoine Bou Rada
- Date of birth: 7 August 2000 (age 26)
- Place of birth: Zgharta, Lebanon
- Position: Forward

Youth career
- 2007–2016: Salam Zgharta

Senior career*
Years	Team	Apps	(Gls)
2016–2018	Salam Zgharta		(9)
2018–2020	SAS		(18)
2020–2022	Safa	21	(9)
2022–2024	EFP	29	(39)
Total			(66)

International career^{‡}
2018–2019	Lebanon U19	6	(5)
2018–2024	Lebanon	26	(2)
Medal record
Women's football
Representing Lebanon
WAFF Women's Championship
Bronze medal – third place	2019
WAFF U-18 Women's Championship
Silver medal – second place	2018	U-18 Team
- * Club domestic league appearances and goals as of 20:42, 12 February 2025 (UTC) ‡ National team caps and goals as of 27 February 2024

Yara Antoine Bou Rada (Arabic: يارا أنطوان بورضا; born 7 August 2000) is a Lebanese former footballer who played as a forward.

== Club career ==
Born in Zgharta, Lebanon, Bou Rada began her career at hometown club Salam Zgharta's boys youth sector aged seven. She remained at the club when they formed a girls sector, and made her U17 debut in 2015. After playing for the U19s, she made her Lebanese Women's Football League debut in 2016.

After two seasons at Salam Zgharta, Bou Rada joined reigning league champions Stars Association for Sports (SAS) in 2018. She spent two seasons at the club, scoring 18 league goals and winning two league titles.

On 20 October 2020, Bou Rada moved to Safa on a three-year contract. She helped Safa win the 2022 edition of the WAFF Women's Clubs Championship, becoming the first Lebanese team to do so; Bou Rada finished as joint-top goalscorer with two goals.

== International career ==
Bou Rada first represented Lebanon internationally at under-18 level at the 2018 WAFF U-18 Women's Championship in Lebanon, where they finished runners-up. She made her senior debut at the 2020 Olympic Qualifying Tournament in 2018, and was called up to the 2019 WAFF Women's Championship, finishing third. She was called up to the 2024 WAFF Women's Championship.

== Personal life ==
In 2020, Bou Rada was majoring in economics.

== Career statistics ==
=== International ===
No.	Date	Venue	Opponent	Score	Result	Competition
1.	8 April 2023	Fouad Chehab Stadium, Jounieh, Lebanon	Indonesia	3–0	5–0	2024 AFC Women's Olympic Qualifying Tournament
2.	15 February 2024	Safa Stadium, Beirut, Lebanon	Syria	1–0	3–1	Friendly

== Honours ==
SAS

- Lebanese Women's Football League: 2018–19, 2019–20
- Lebanese Women's FA Cup: 2018–19
- Lebanese Women's Super Cup: 2018
- WAFF Women's Clubs Championship runner-up: 2019

Safa

- WAFF Women's Clubs Championship: 2022
- Lebanese Women's Football League: 2020–21

Lebanon U18

- WAFF U-18 Women's Championship runner-up: 2018

Lebanon

- WAFF Women's Championship third place: 2019

Individual

- WAFF Women's Clubs Championship top goalscorer: 2022 (Note: Tied with Lea Hachem and Haya Khalil)

== See also ==
- List of Lebanon women's international footballers
