= Shabab Al-Iraq SC =

Iraqi football club

- Full name: Shabab Al-Iraq Sport Club
- Founded: 2013; 13 years ago as Badr Al-Iraq
- Ground: Shabab Al-Iraq Stadium
- Owner: Badr Organization
- Chairman: Raed Rajeh Essa
- Manager: Bassim Mahmoud
- League: Iraqi Third Division League
Home colours	Away colours

Shabab Al-Iraq Sport Club (Arabic: نادي شباب العراق الرياضي), is an Iraqi football team based in Al-Karkh, Baghdad.

== History ==
=== Changing the name ===
The club was founded in the name of Badr Al-Iraq, and the team played under this name in the Iraq FA Cup in the 2016–17 and 2018–19 seasons, and in the Iraqi First Division League. In June 2019, the club's name was changed, and it was called Shabab Al-Iraq, and it participated in the FA Cup with this name in the subsequent seasons, such as the 2019–20 and 2020–21 seasons.

== Managerial history ==
- (Iraq) Aqeel Jabbar
- (Iraq) Hamed Al-Kaabi
- (Iraq) Ahmed Fi'el
- (Iraq) Bassim Mahmoud

== See also ==
- 2018–19 Iraq FA Cup
- 2019–20 Iraq FA Cup
- 2020–21 Iraq FA Cup
