= Al-Faw SC =

Iraqi football club

- Full name: Al-Faw Sport Club
- Founded: 1993; 32 years ago
- Ground: Al-Faw Stadium
- Capacity: 4,000
- Chairman: Muhannad Waleed Hussein
- Manager: Husham Tawfiq
- League: Iraqi Third Division League
Home colours	Away colours

Al-Faw Sport Club (Arabic: نادي الفاو الرياضي) is an Iraqi football team based in Al-Faw, Basra, that plays in Iraqi Third Division League.

== Managerial history ==
- (Iraq) Ali Musa
- (Iraq) Ali Abdullah
- (Iraq) Husham Tawfiq

== See also ==
- 2021–22 Iraqi Third Division League
- 2022–23 Iraqi Third Division League
