= Al-Rusafa SC =

Iraqi football club

- Full name: Al-Rusafa Sport Club
- Founded: 2004; 22 years ago
- Ground: Al-Rusafa Stadium
- Capacity: 1,000
- Chairman: Yassin Al-Hassoun
- Manager: Salam Al-Magsousi
- League: Iraqi Third Division League
Home colours	Away colours

Al-Rusafa Sport Club (Arabic: نادي الرصافة الرياضي), is an Iraqi football team based in Baghdad, that plays in the Iraqi Third Division League.

== Stadium ==
In August 2014, Al-Rusafa Stadium was opened by the governor of Baghdad in the Bob Al-Sham neighborhood at a cost of 489 million IQD, with a capacity of a thousand spectators.

== Managerial history ==
- (Iraq) Mohammed Aboud
- (Iraq) Salam Al-Magsousi

== See also ==
- 2016–17 Iraq FA Cup
