= Al-Siyaha SC =

Iraqi football club

- Full name: Al-Siyaha Sport Club
- Founded: 1983; 42 years ago
- Ground: Al-Siyaha Stadium
- Chairman: Ali Jassim Al-Hamidawi
- Manager: Qasim Mohammed
- League: Iraqi Third Division League
| Home colours | Away colours |

Al-Siyaha Sport Club (Arabic: نادي السياحة الرياضي), is an Iraqi football team based in Baghdad, that plays in the Iraqi Third Division League.

== Managerial history ==
- (Iraq) Salam Tuaima
- (Iraq) Khalaf Habash
- (Iraq) Qasim Mohammed

== Notable players ==
- (Iraq) Alaa Abbas (2011–2013)

== See also ==
- 2000–01 Iraqi Elite League
- 2001–02 Iraq FA Cup
- 2016–17 Iraq FA Cup
