= Mohammed Ali Abbood =

Iraqi footballer (born 2000)

Personal information
- Full name: Mohammed Ali Abbood Suwaed
- Date of birth: 1 October 2000 (age 26)
- Place of birth: Baghdad, Iraq
- Height: 1.75 m (5 ft 9 in)
- Position: Midfielder

Team information
- Current team: Zakho

Senior career*
Years	Team	Apps	(Gls)
2016–2017	Al-Najda		
2017–2018	Al-Sinaat Al-Kahrabaiya		
2018–2023	Al-Quwa Al-Jawiya		
2023–2024	Al-Zawraa		
2024–	Zakho		

International career^{‡}
2016–2017	Iraq U17	9	(0)
2017	Iraq U20	2	(0)
2021–	Iraq	3	(0)
- * Club domestic league appearances and goals as of 13 March 2021 ‡ National team caps and goals as of 11 November 2021

Mohammed Ali Abbood Suwaed (Arabic: مُحَمَّد عَلِيّ عَبُّود سُوَيْد; born 1 October 2000) is an Iraqi footballer who plays as a midfielder for Iraqi Premier League club Zakho and the Iraqi national team.

== Club career ==
=== Al-Sinaat Al-Kahrabaiya ===
Mohammed joined Iraqi Premier League club Al-Sinaat Al-Kahrabaiya in September 2017 from Iraqi First Division League side Al-Najda.

=== Al-Quwa Al-Jawiya ===
In September 2018, Abbood signed for Iraqi club Al-Quwa Al-Jawiya. He started the 2018 AFC Cup Final as Jawiya won the tournament for the third successive year. Ali Abbood made his AFC Champions League debut on 12 February 2019, against Uzbek side Pakhtakor.

== International career ==
=== Youth ===
Mohammed's first international call up came in 2015 with the Iraq U16s for the 2016 AFC U-16 Championship qualifiers. He was included in the final squad for the tournament and helped Iraq win their first-ever tournament.

Abbood was called up to the Iraq U17s for the 2017 FIFA U-17 World Cup as Iraq were eliminated in the knockout round.

=== Senior ===
In October 2021, Mohammed was called up to the senior national team for the first time for the 2022 World Cup qualifiers against Lebanon and the United Arab Emirates. He made his debut against Lebanon on 7 October 2021.

== Honours ==
=== Club ===
Al-Quwa Al-Jawiya

- Iraqi Premier League: 2020–21
- Iraq FA Cup: 2020–21, 2022–23
- AFC Cup: 2018

=== International ===
Iraq U16

- AFC U-16 Championship: 2016

Iraq

- Arabian Gulf Cup: 2023
