= 2015–16 Iraqi Women's Football League =

Iraqi Women's Football League
- Season: 2015–16
- Champions: Ghaz Al-Shamal (1st title)
- Matches: 10
- Goals: 57 (5.7 per match)

The 2015–16 Iraqi Women's Football League was the first season of the Iraqi Women's Football League, which started on 25 April 2016 and ended on 19 July 2016. Ghaz Al-Shamal won the title coached by Qasim Jameel by beating Zeravani 1–0 in the final.

== Group stage ==
=== North Group ===
Pos	Team	Pld	W	D	L	GF	GA	GD	Pts	Qualification
1	Zeravani	2	2	0	0	13	0	+13	6	Qualified to Semi-finals
2	Ghaz Al-Shamal	2	1	0	1	2	5	−3	3	Qualified to Semi-finals
3	Al-Thawra	2	0	0	2	1	11	−10	0	
4	Aphrodite	0	0	0	0	0	0	0	0	Withdrew

Source: Kooora
Rules for classification: 1) Points, 2) Goal difference, 3) Goals scored
22 April 2016

Ghaz Al-Shamal	2–1	Al-Thawra
Othman 6'; Mohammed 44'		Younis 15'

Al-Nashat Al-Madrasi Stadium, Kirkuk
28 April 2016

Zeravani	4–0	Ghaz Al-Shamal
Qamari 2'; L. Mohammed 17'; Khan 46'; Sabeel (pen.)

Franso Hariri Secondary Stadium, Erbil
1 May 2016

Al-Thawra	0–9	Zeravani
		Qamari; Mouri; L. Mohammed; Shukri; Farhad; Raouf; Daham; H. Mohammed

Franso Hariri Secondary Stadium, Erbil

=== Central Group ===
Pos	Team	Pld	W	D	L	GF	GA	GD	Pts	Qualification
1	Al-Quwa Al-Jawiya	2	2	0	0	16	0	+16	6	Qualified to Semi-finals
2	Biladi	2	1	0	1	3	8	−5	3	Qualified to Semi-finals
3	Al-Miqdadiya	2	0	0	2	0	11	−11	0	

Source: Kooora
Rules for classification: 1) Points, 2) Goal difference, 3) Goals scored
28 April 2016

Al-Miqdadiya	0–8	Al-Quwa Al-Jawiya

May 2016

Al-Quwa Al-Jawiya	8–0	Biladi

5 May 2016

Biladi	3–0 (w/o)	Al-Miqdadiya

The Biladi–Al-Miqdadiya match originally ended 1–1 and was set to go to a penalty shootout, however Al-Miqdadiya refused to take penalties and Biladi were thus awarded a walkover victory.

== Golden stage ==
Semi-finals
15 July 2016
Zeravani	11
Biladi	0
16 July 2016
Ghaz Al-Shamal (w/o)	3
Al-Quwa Al-Jawiya	0

Final
19 July 2016
Zeravani	0
Ghaz Al-Shamal	1
Third place
18 July 2016
Al-Quwa Al-Jawiya	7
Biladi	0

=== Semi-finals ===
15 July 2016
17:00 UTC+03:00

Zeravani	11–0	Biladi
Shukri 3', 25'; Qamari 7', 31', 47', 63', 68', 73'; L. Mohammed 18', 28'; Bakhit 55'

Zeravani Stadium, Duhok
16 July 2016
17:00 UTC+03:00

Ghaz Al-Shamal	3–0 (w/o)	Al-Quwa Al-Jawiya
		Abbas (red card); Fadhel (red card)

Zeravani Stadium, Duhok

The Ghaz Al-Shamal–Al-Quwa Al-Jawiya match was 2–2 with five minutes left when Ghaz Al-Shamal were awarded a penalty. Al-Quwa Al-Jawiya players refused to continue the match in protest at the refereeing, therefore Ghaz Al-Shamal were awarded a walkover victory.

=== Third place match ===
18 July 2016
17:00 UTC+03:00

Al-Quwa Al-Jawiya	7–0	Biladi

Zeravani Stadium, Duhok

=== Final ===
19 July 2016
17:00 UTC+03:00

Zeravani	0–1	Ghaz Al-Shamal
		Mahdi 54'

Zeravani Stadium, Duhok

== See also ==
- 2015–16 Iraqi Premier League
- 2015–16 Iraqi First Division League
- 2015–16 Iraq FA Cup
