= Al-Diwan SC =

Iraqi football club

- Full name: Al-Diwan Sport Club
- Founded: 2013; 12 years ago
- Ground: Al-Diwan Stadium
- Owner: Sunni Endowment Office
- Chairman: Mohammed Adnan
- Manager: Haider Mohammed Hadi
- League: Iraqi Third Division League
Home colours	Away colours

Al-Diwan Sport Club (Arabic: نادي الديوان الرياضي), is an Iraqi football team based in Baghdad.

== Managerial history ==
- (Iraq) Haider Mohammed Hadi

== See also ==
- 2016–17 Iraq FA Cup
