= Al-Iskan SC =

Iraqi football club

- Full name: Al-Iskan Sport Club
- Founded: 2011; 14 years ago
- Ground: Al-Iskan Stadium
- Chairman: Abbas Hussein Salem
- Manager: Mohammed Hussein Jumaa
- League: Iraqi Third Division League
Home colours	Away colours

Al-Iskan Sport Club (Arabic: نادي الإسكان الرياضي), is an Iraqi football team based in Baghdad, that plays in the Iraqi Third Division League.

== Managerial history ==
- (Iraq) Bashar Muwaishi
- (Iraq) Jaafar Saleh
- (Iraq) Mohammed Hussein Jumaa

== Famous players ==
- (Iraq) Alaa Abbas

== See also ==
- 2016–17 Iraq FA Cup
- 2020–21 Iraq FA Cup
