= Alaa Abbas =

Iraqi footballer (born 1997)

Personal information
- Full name: Alaa Abbas Abdulnabi Al-Farttoosi
- Date of birth: 27 July 1997 (age 29)
- Place of birth: Baghdad, Iraq
- Height: 1.80 m (5 ft 11 in)
- Position: Striker

Team information
- Current team: Duhok SC
- Number: 88

Youth career
- Ammo Baba School
- Al-Shorta

Senior career*
Years	Team	Apps	(Gls)
2011–2013	Al-Siyaha		
2013–2014	Al-Iskan		(14)
2014–2016	Karbala		(5)
2016–2017	Naft Al-Wasat		(2)
2017	Naft Al-Junoob		(2)
2017–2018	Naft Al-Wasat		(21)
2018–2020	Al-Zawraa	31	(20)
2020	Al-Kuwait	8	(3)
2020–2021	Gil Vicente	4	(1)
2021–2022	Al-Quwa Al-Jawiya	23	(9)
2022–2023	Al-Zawraa		(9)
2023–2024	Nassaji	10	(1)
2024	Al-Zawraa		(5)
2024-2025	Al-Quwa Al-Jawiya		(10)
2025	Najaf SC		
2026	Duhok SC		

International career^{‡}
2015–2016	Iraq U19	7	(5)
2018–2020	Iraq U23	1	(0)
2018–	Iraq	22	(4)
- * Club domestic league appearances and goals ‡ National team caps and goals as of 21 January 2022

Alaa Abbas Abdulnabi Al-Farttoosi (Arabic: عَلَاء عَبَّاس عَبْد النَّبِيّ الْفَرْطُوسِيّ; born 27 July 1997) is an Iraqi footballer who plays as a striker for Duhok SC in the Iraq Stars League.

== Career ==
Abbas was included in Iraq's squad for the 2019 AFC Asian Cup in the United Arab Emirates. On 24 December 2018, Abbas won his first international cap with Iraq against China in a friendly match.

He played only one season with Kuwait SC in the Kuwait Premier League and has directly aroused the interest of several European clubs especially for his performances with the Iraqi national team. On 6 December 2020, the Portuguese club Gil Vicente officialized the arrival of striker Alaa Abbas for a three-year contract to strengthen the team's offensive in Liga NOS. The number 10 has been granted to him.

Alaa Abbas' agent Aimar Risan stated on Iraqi national television that the contract with Gil Vicente includes a release clause of 25 million euros.

== Career statistics ==
=== International ===
As of 2 December 2019

Iraq
Year	Apps	Goals
2018	1	0
2019	17	3
2021	1	0
2022	3	1
Total	22	4

=== International goals ===
Scores and results list Iraq's goal tally first.

No	Date	Venue	Opponent	Score	Result	Competition
1.	12 January 2019	Sharjah Stadium, Sharjah, UAE	Yemen	3–0	3–0	2019 AFC Asian Cup
2.	14 November 2019	Amman International Stadium, Amman, Jordan	Iran	2–1	2–1	2022 FIFA World Cup qualification
3.	29 November 2019	Khalifa International Stadium, Doha, Qatar	United Arab Emirates	1–0	2–0	24th Arabian Gulf Cup
4.	21 January 2022	Al-Madina Stadium, Baghdad, Iraq	Uganda	1–0	1–0	Friendly

== Honours ==
Al-Zawraa

- Iraq FA Cup: 2018–19

Al-Kuwait

- Kuwaiti Premier League: 2019–20
- Kuwait Crown Prince Cup: 2019–20

Iraq

- Arabian Gulf Cup: 2023

Individual

- Iraq FA Cup top scorer: 2018–19
- Soccer Iraq Goal of the Season: 2021–22
