= Al-Hurr SC =

Iraqi football club

- Full name: Al-Hurr Sport Club
- Founded: 2003; 23 years ago
- Ground: Al-Hurr Stadium
- Chairman: Hammoud Khleif Al-Yassari
- Manager: Ahmed Awad
- League: Iraqi Third Division League
| Home colours | Away colours |

Al-Hurr Sport Club (Arabic: نادي الحُرّ الرياضي), is an Iraqi football team based in Karbalaa, that plays in Iraqi Third Division League.

== Managerial history ==
- (Iraq) Maitham Dael-Haq
- (Iraq) Ahmed Awad

== See also ==
- 2012–13 Iraq FA Cup
- 2016–17 Iraq FA Cup
