= Shabab Al-Adil SC =

Iraqi football club

- Full name: Shabab Al-Adil Sport Club
- Founded: 2014; 12 years ago
- Ground: Shabab Al-Adil Stadium
- Chairman: Abdul-Karim Fares Al-Saadi
- Manager: Haider Abdul-Zahra
- League: Iraqi Third Division League
Home colours	Away colours

Shabab Al-Adil Sport Club (Arabic: نادي شباب العدل الرياضي), is an Iraq football team based in Baghdad.

== Managerial history ==
- (Iraq) Bassim Jaati
- (Iraq) Haider Abdul-Zahra

== See also ==
- 2016–17 Iraq FA Cup
