= Al-Shuhadaa SC =

Iraqi football club

- Full name: Al-Shuhadaa Sport Club
- Founded: 2014; 11 years ago
- Ground: Faleh Raddad Flayeh Stadium
- Owner: Martyrs Foundation
- Chairman: Nassir Ali Hussein
- Manager: Haider Hadi
- League: Iraqi Third Division League
Home colours	Away colours

Al-Shuhadaa Sport Club (Arabic: نادي الشهداء الرياضي), is an Iraqi football team based in Wasit, that plays in Iraqi Third Division League.

== Managerial history ==
- (Iraq) Emad Omran
- (Iraq) Thaer Jassim
- (Iraq) Haider Hadi

== See also ==
- 2021–22 Iraqi Third Division League
