= Al-Wydad SC (Iraq) =

Iraqi football club

- Full name: Al-Wydad Sport Club
- Founded: 2003; 22 years ago
- Ground: Al-Dujaili Stadium
- Chairman: Anwar Khalaf Mussa
- Manager: Sajjad Mahmoud
- League: Iraqi Third Division League
Home colours	Away colours

Al-Wydad Sport Club (Arabic: نادي الوداد الرياضي), is an Iraqi football team based in Wasit, that plays in Iraqi Third Division League.

== Managerial history ==
- (Iraq) Sajjad Mahmoud

== See also ==
- 2021–22 Iraq FA Cup
