= Al-Hashimiya SC (Iraq) =

Iraqi football club

- Full name: Al-Hashimiya Sport Club
- Founded: 1973; 53 years ago
- Ground: Al-Hashimiya Stadium
- Chairman: Ali Hussein Al-Harethi
- Manager: Safaa Rahim
- League: Iraqi Third Division League
Home colours	Away colours

Al-Hashimiya Sport Club (Arabic: نادي الهاشمية الرياضي), is an Iraqi football team based in Babil.

== Managerial history ==
- (Iraq) Hamza Athab
- (Iraq) Fouad Jawad
- (Iraq) Ali Ubayes
- (Iraq) Saleem Tayeh Obaid
- (Iraq) Hassan Hadi
- (Iraq) Ibrahim Hussein
- (Iraq) Haider Al-Maquraj
- (Iraq) Safaa Rahim

== See also ==
- 2021–22 Iraq FA Cup
