= Khamis Humoud =

Iraqi footballer

Personal information
- Full name: Khamis Humoud
- Position: Defender

Senior career*
Years	Team	Apps	(Gls)
- Al-Sinaa SC
- Al-Shorta

International career
1985-1987	Iraq		
- * Club domestic league appearances and goals

Khamis Humoud (Arabic: خَمِيس حَمُّود) is a former Iraqi football defender. He competed in the 1986 Asian Games. Humoud played for Iraq between 1985 and 1987.
