= Al-Maslaha SC =

Iraqi football club

- Full name: Al-Maslaha Sport Club
- Founded: 2003; 22 years ago
- Ground: Al-Jolan Stadium
- Chairman: Rasan Hammoud
- Manager: Haider Mohammed
- League: Iraqi Third Division League
Home colours	Away colours

Al-Maslaha Sport Club (Arabic: نادي المصلحة الرياضي), is an Iraqi football team based in Baghdad, that plays in the Iraqi Third Division League.

== Managerial history ==
- (Iraq) Haider Mohammed

== See also ==
- 2016–17 Iraq FA Cup
