= Al-Tarmiya SC =

Iraqi football club

- Full name: Al-Tarmiya Sport Club
- Founded: 1992; 34 years ago
- Ground: Al-Tarmiya Stadium
- Chairman: Ali Mohsin Ali
- Manager: Hashim Mohammed
- League: Iraqi Third Division League
Home colours	Away colours

Al-Tarmiya Sport Club (Arabic: نادي الطارمية الرياضي) is an Iraqi football team based in Al-Tarmiya, Baghdad, that plays in the Iraqi Third Division League.

== Managerial history ==
- (Iraq) Ahmed Dareb
- (Iraq) Khalil Lateef Abbas
- (Iraq) Ibrahim Abid
- (Iraq) Mohammed Jassim
- (Iraq) Ammar Mudhaffar
- (Iraq) Hashim Mohammed

== See also ==
- 2016–17 Iraq FA Cup
