= Zeravani SC =

Iraqi football club

- Full name: Zeravani Sport Club
- Founded: 2011; 15 years ago
- League: Iraqi Third Division League
Home colours	Away colours

Zeravani (Arabic: نادي زيرفاني, Kurdish: یانه ی زێڕه ڤانی) is a sports club based in Duhok, Kurdistan Region, Iraq. It was formed in 2011, entering competition in the Kurdish Premier League.

== Club history ==
The predecessor club was known as Pires SC, which competed in the Iraqi Premier League, a FIFA sanctioned league, until the 2009–10 season. The club then ceased operation.

In 2011, Zeravani SC was formed from the remnants of Pires SC, and began competing in the Kurdish Premier League. It used the same stadium and same colours as Pires SC. Zeravani SC were champions of the 2012–13 Kurdish Premier League season and runners-up of the 2015–16 Iraqi Women's Football League season.

== Current squad ==
Note: Flags indicate national team as defined under FIFA eligibility rules; some limited exceptions apply. Players may hold more than one non-FIFA nationality.

No.	Pos.	Nation	Player
