= Naft Al-Shamal SC =

Iraqi football club

Naft Al-Shamal
- Full name: Naft Al-Shamal Sport Club
- Founded: 1977; 49 years ago
- Ground: Naft Al-Shamal Stadium
- Chairman: Mohammed Salem Mohammed
- Manager: Ahmed Habib
- League: Iraqi Third Division League
Home colours	Away colours

Naft Al-Shamal Sport Club (Arabic: نادي نفط الشمال الرياضي), or North Oil Sport Club, is an Iraqi football team based in Kirkuk. Their men's team plays in the Iraqi Third Division League, while their women's team plays in the Iraqi Women's Football League.

== History ==
The original Sharikat Naft Al-Shamal team (Northern Oil Company) was established in 1948, and its name was later changed to Al-Amaliyat Al-Naftiya Al-Mahdouda. Naft Al-Shamal SC was founded in 1977, and its name was later changed to Wahid Huzairan. In 2017, it returned to the name Naft Al-Shamal.

In addition to the fact that the club has a team that plays in the Iraqi Third Division League, it also has another team that plays in the Kurdistan Premier League, and a women's team that plays in the Iraqi Women's Football League.

== Honours ==
=== Women's team ===
- Iraqi Women's Football League
  - Winners (1): 2020–21

== Managerial history ==
- (Iraq) Ahmed Habib

== See also ==
- 2021–22 Iraq FA Cup
