= Al-Midhatiya SC =

Iraqi football club

- Full name: Al-Midhatiya Sport Club
- Founded: 1972; 54 years ago
- Ground: Al-Midhatiya Stadium
- Manager: Hassan Hadi
- League: Iraqi Third Division League
Home colours	Away colours

Al-Midhatiya Sport Club (Arabic: نادي المدحتية الرياضي), is an Iraqi football team based in Babil, that plays in the Iraqi Third Division League.

== Managerial history ==
- (Iraq) Hassan Hadi

== See also ==
- 2002–03 Iraq FA Cup
