= Ghaz Al-Shamal SC =

Iraqi football club

Ghaz Al-Shamal
- Full name: Ghaz Al-Shamal
- Founded: 2004; 22 years ago
- Ground: Kirkuk Olympic Stadium
- Capacity: 25,000
- Chairman: Warya Jalal
- Manager: Raafat Mohammad
- League: Iraq Stars League
- 2025–26: Iraqi Premier Division League, 2nd of 20 (promoted)
Home colours	Away colours

Ghaz Al-Shamal (Arabic: نادي غاز الشمال; English: North Gas Sport Club) is an Iraqi professional football team based in Kirkuk that plays in Iraq Stars League. Its women's team plays in the Iraqi Women's Football League.

== History ==
In the 2025–26 season, the team, under the leadership of coach Chaceb Sultan, was able to secure runner-up the Iraqi Premier Division League and promoted to play in the Iraq Stars League (top tier) for the first time in its history.

== Managerial history ==
- (Iraq) Waleed Mohammed Qader
- (Iraq) Karim Qambel
- (Iraq) Mohammed Qasim
- (Iraq) Jumaa Jodaya
- (Iraq) Natiq Haddad
- (Iraq) Chaceb Sultan

== Honours ==
=== Men's team ===
- Iraqi Premier Division League (second tier)
  - Runner-up (1): 2025–26

=== Women's team ===
- Iraqi Women's Football League
  - Winners (1): 2015–16

== See also ==
- 2012–13 Iraq FA Cup
- 2015–16 Iraq FA Cup
- 2020–21 Iraq FA Cup
