= Al-Najda SC =

Iraqi football club

- Full name: Al-Najda Sport Club
- Nicknames: Usood Al-Dakhiliya (Lions of Interior)
- Founded: 2005
- Dissolved: 2023
- Ground: Al-Najda Stadium
- Owner: Ministry of Interior
- League: Iraqi Third Division League
Home colours	Away colours

Al-Najda Sport Club (Arabic: نادي النجدة الرياضي), was an Iraqi football team based in Baghdad, that played in the Iraqi Third Division League.

The club was dissolved by the Ministry of Interior in 2023.

== History ==
Before the foundation of Al-Najda Sport Club, there was another football team, similarly named Shortat Al-Najda, which was founded in 1960, and was affiliated with the Iraqi Police. In 1974, Shortat Al-Najda and the other Police teams were replaced in the top-flight by Al-Shorta Sports Club after the foundation of the National Clubs League.

Shortat Al-Najda participated in non-IFA competitions such as the Armed Forces League from 1974 until the early 1980s when the team disbanded. In 2005, Al-Najda SC was founded.

== Managerial history ==
- (Iraq) Bahaa Kadhim

== See also ==
- 2016–17 Iraq FA Cup
