= Al-Sinaa Stadium =

Stadium in Bagdad, Iraq

- ملعب الصناعة
- Interactive map of Al-Sinaa Stadium
- Location: Baghdad, Iraq
- Coordinates: 33.345956°N 44.453591°E
- Owner: Ministry of Industry and Minerals (Iraq)
- Capacity: 6,000

Tenant
- Al-Sinaa SC

Al-Sinaa Stadium (Arabic: ملعب الصناعة) is a multi-use stadium in Baghdad, Iraq. It is currently used mostly for football matches and is the home stadium of Al-Sinaa SC. The stadium holds up to 6,000 people.

The stadium hosted the 2017 Iraq FA Cup Final on 22 August 2017 between Al-Zawraa and Naft Al-Wasat. Al-Zawraa won the match 1–0 with a stoppage time goal from Alaa Abdul-Zahra, for the club's record 15th title.

== See also ==
- List of football stadiums in Iraq
- 2017 Iraq FA Cup Final
