= Biladi SC =

Iraqi football club

- Full name: Biladi Sport Club
- Founded: 2005; 20 years ago
- Ground: Biladi Stadium
- Chairman: Mudhahir Jalil Al-Rikabi
- Manager: Mahmoud Shaker Sheheet
- League: Iraqi Third Division League
Home colours	Away colours

Biladi Sport Club (Arabic: نادي بلادي الرياضي), is an Iraqi football team based in Baghdad, that plays in the Iraqi Third Division League.

== Managerial history ==
- (Iraq) Saeed Hameed
- (Iraq) Mahmoud Shaker Sheheet

== See also ==
- 2012–13 Iraq FA Cup
- 2016–17 Iraq FA Cup
- 2018–19 Iraq FA Cup
- 2019–20 Iraq FA Cup
- 2020–21 Iraq FA Cup
- 2021–22 Iraq FA Cup
