= 2024–25 Al-Mina'a SC season =

Al-Mina'a SC
2024–25 season
- Chairman: Farhan Al-Farttousi
- Manager: Pablo Grandes (until 8 February); Hussam Al Sayed (from 21 February)
- Ground: Al-Minaa Olympic Stadium; Al-Fayhaa Stadium
- Iraq Stars League: 16th
- FA Cup: Quarter-finals
- Top goalscorer: League: Alaa Abdul-Zahra (11); All: Alaa Abdul-Zahra (13)
- Biggest win: 3–0 vs Erbil (H) (5 December 2024); 3–0 vs Diyala (H) (2 July 2025)
- Biggest defeat: 1–5 vs Newroz (H) (4 February 2025)
Home colours	Away colours

The 2024–25 season was Al-Minaa's second season in the newly-formed Iraq Stars League, and their 48th season in the top division of Iraq football.

== Review ==
=== Background ===
After Al-Minaa Club entered into an administrative crisis last season, as FIFA imposed a ban on contracting players, it was forced to play with the academy players. Despite all the difficulties, it was able to ensure its survival in the Iraq Stars League since the 35th round and finished the league in 12th place, which was considered a football miracle. However, coach Hassan Ahmed apologized for continuing with the team and withdrew after the end of the season. So the club's newly elected management began contracting with Spanish coach Pablo Grandes on 29 July to prepare a team that would compete for the league.

=== Summer transfer window ===
The Iraq Stars League summer transfer window runs from 2 August to 2 September 2024. Al-Minaa announced from the first day the renewal of the contract of right back Hameed Ali Hameed.

On 5 August, Al-Minaa announced the signing of three professional players and the renewal of two local players. The club signed 22-year-old Tunisian attacking midfielder Abdallah Amri from Tunisian club CS Sfaxien, 25-year-old Gabonese international defensive midfielder Clech Loufilou from Omani club Sur, and 23-year-old Swedish left winger of Iraqi origin Hamid Abdulla from Swedish club Rosengård. The club also renewed the contracts of goalkeeper Jaafar Shenaishil and midfielder Ayad Abed Farhan.

On 7 August, the club renewed the contract of the team's goalkeeper and the U-17 national team, Ammar Ali, and on 8 August, it renewed the contract of the right winger, Sajjad Alaa, and announced the signing of the 24-year-old Congolese right winger, Tuisila Kisinda, coming from the Moroccan club, RS Berkane. On 9 August, the club renewed the contract of defensive midfielder Haidar Salem.

On 10 August, coach Pablo Grandes arrived in Basra from Spain with his assistant Iván McCarroll to officially lead the Al-Minaa team. He was introduced to the media as the coach of Al-Minaa, and he said in the press conference that he wanted to compete for advanced positions in the league and that he chose Al-Minaa because it is the oldest club among the Iraqi clubs and that he would work to create a competitive team.

On 12 August, the club announced the signing of 31-year-old Spanish striker Lolo Plá from Spanish club, Talavera. The contract of central midfielder Mohammed Khudhair was also renewed, as was the contract of centre back Hussein Amer after his return from a loan to Naft Maysan.

On 13 August, the club announced the signing of 29-year-old Zimbabwean international centre back Gerald Takwara from Saudi club Ohod. Centre back Mohammed Ghaleb's contract was also renewed, as was goalkeeper Abed Saleem's contract after he returned from loan to Amanat Baghdad. On August 15, 16 and 17, the contracts of defenders Mojtaba Ali and Abbas Yas and striker Salem Ahmed were renewed. On 18 August, the club renewed the contracts of left-back Muslim Mousa and left-winger Karrar Jaafar, and a day later announced the signing of 23-year-old midfielder Amir Ahmed from Al-Naft. On 21 August, the club renewed the contract of right-back Karrar Al-Amir Ali.

On 26 August, the club announced the signing of 30-year-old striker Mohannad Abdul-Raheem from Al-Quwa Al-Jawiya. It also announced the signing of 24-year-old Spanish right-back Raúl Parra from Portuguese club Estoril. Thus, the club announced the completion of the six professional players, according to the IFA regulations, which requires that the number of professional players not exceed six players.

On 27 August, the club announced the signing of 36-year-old striker Alaa Abdul-Zahra from Al-Shorta. On 28 August, the club announced the signing of 28-year-old Swedish defensive midfielder of Iraqi origin, Sumar Almadjed, from the Swedish club Helsingborgs IF. On 30 August, the club announced the signing of 24-year-old Swedish defensive midfielder of Iraqi origin, André Alsanati, from the Swedish club IK Sirius.

=== Pre-season ===
The 2024 WAFF U-16 Championship took place in Jordan from 2 to 11 September. Two Al-Minaa first-team players were named in squads for the tournament, Ammar Ali and Zain Al-Abidin Jassim. They played in the starting lineup in the first match against Lebanon on 4 September, and Jassim scored two goals.

The Iraqi U-20 team left for China on 1 September to play two friendly matches against China in preparation for the 2025 AFC U-20 Asian Cup qualification. The travelling delegation was joined by three Al-Minaa first-team players who had previously been named in the squad: Karrar Jaafar, Muslim Mousa and Mohammed Ghaleb.

Gerald Takwara (Zimbabwe) was called up to respective country' senior squads for international fixtures in September.

On 1 September, Al-Minaa announced a pre-season tour to Antalya, and the following day it was also announced that Spanish match analyst Daniel Casas Trillo had joined the coaching staff, as he joined the team in Antalya with player Raúl Parra.

On 5 September, Al-Minaa took on Süper Lig club Antalyaspor. Sajjad Alaa gave Al-Minaa an early lead. Alaa Abdul-Zahra scored a second goal. In the second half, Lolo Plá scored the third goal, helping Al-Minaa win 3–0.

On 7 September, Tunisian Abdallah Amri and Gabonese Clech Loufilou joined the team's training in Antalya, along with 20-year-old goalkeeper Abbas Karim, who officially signed Al-Minaa from Al-Shorta.

On 10 September, Al-Minaa played against the Iraq Stars League club Al-Zawraa in their second friendly match. Sajjad Alaa gave Al-Minaa an early lead. Lolo Plá scored a second goal, while Ibrahim Ghazi scored for Al-Zawraa. In the second half, Hasan Abdulkareem scored for Al-Zawraa to end the match 2–2.

On 14 September, Al-Minaa played their third friendly match against Turkish Regional Amateur League club Kumluca Belediye Spor, with Hameed Ali Hameed scoring the only goal of the match in the second half to help Al-Minaa win 1–0, and with that the team ended their 14-day pre-season tour in Turkey and returned to Iraq the following day.

=== September ===

Starting XI for the Iraq Stars League home match against Al-Hudood on 22 September 2024

Grandes's side kicked off their Iraqi Star League campaign with a 2–1 win over Al-Hudood at home on 22 September. Al-Hudood's Hussein Jabbar in a 19th-minute opener with an own goal after Parra's free kick hit Jabbar's head and changed direction, deceiving the goalkeeper. Almadjed added the second goal in the 51st minute after an assist from Lolo, while Atheer Saleh scored the only goal for the visiting team after three minutes from a free kick. Four players from the first team were missed from the match, Mohannad Abdul-Raheem due to injury, and three players, namely Muslim Musa, Mohammed Ghaleb and Karrar Jaafar, were selected by the coach of the U-20, Emad Mohammed, to participate in the 2025 AFC U-20 Asian Cup qualification in Thailand, which will be played from September 25 to 29. They played in the starting lineup in the first match against Brunei and Karrar Jaafar scored two goals in this match.

Al-Minaa travelled to the capital to face Al-Quwa Al-Jawiya at Al-Shaab Stadium in second round. Lolo opened the scoring from long range in the 23th minute. Al-Quwa Al-Jawiya drew level with a penalty kick scored by Saad Abdul-Amir on 88 minutes. Mustafa Saadoon completed the turnaround for Al-Quwa Al-Jawiya in the extra time. The 2–1 loss left the Al-Minaa sitting eighth in the league table.

=== October ===
Al-Minaa announced on 2 October that the arrival of André Alsanati’s international card, and that he is now ready to participate with the team in the upcoming match. The team also regained its three players Muslim Musa, Mohammed Ghaleb and Karrar Jaafar, from the U-20 team, and they are also ready to participate with the team.

== First-team squad ==
As of 2 July 2025

No.	Name	Nat.	Position(s)	Date of birth (age)	Signed from	Apps	Goals
Goalkeepers
1	Abed Saleem	(Iraq)	GK	14 Oct 1995 (age 30)	Al-Karkh	36	0
21	Abbas Karim	(Iraq)	GK	15 Nov 2003 (age 22)	Al-Shorta	1	0
22	Jaafar Shenaishil	(Iraq)	GK	21 Apr 2003 (age 23)	Al-Minaa Academy	40	0
Defenders
4	Mujtaba Ali	(Iraq)	CB / RB / LB	4 Oct 2002 (age 23)	Al-Minaa Academy	47	3
5	Hussein Amer	(Iraq)	CB	28 Apr 2002 (age 24)	Al-Sinaat Al-Kahrabaiya	18	0
17	Muslim Mousa	(Iraq)	LB / LWB	11 Mar 2005 (age 21)	Al-Minaa Academy	57	4
18	Hameed Ali Hameed	(Iraq)	RB / RWB	25 Sep 2004 (age 22)	Al-Minaa Academy	57	2
31	Gerald Takwara	(Zimbabwe)	CB	29 Oct 1994 (age 31)	Ohod	30	1
33	Abbas Yas	(Iraq)	LB / CB / DM	3 Jul 2003 (age 23)	Al-Minaa Academy	150	4
40	Mohammed Ghaleb	(Iraq)	CB	26 Sep 2005 (age 21)	Al-Minaa Academy	26	0
Midfielders
6	Haider Salem	(Iraq)	DM / CB	3 Dec 1993 (age 32)	Naft Al-Basra	80	2
15	Osama Anbar	(Yemen)	CM	20 Jan 1995 (age 31)	Al-Kahrabaa	11	0
25	Amir Ahmed	(Iraq)	DM / CM / CB	6 Jan 2001 (age 25)	Al-Naft	7	0
27	Ousseynou Thioune	(Senegal)	DM	16 Nov 1993 (age 32)	Anorthosis Famagusta	15	0
79	Clech Loufilou	(Gabon)	DM / CM	12 Apr 1999 (age 27)	Sur	35	0
Forwards
9	Salem Ahmed	(Iraq)	ST	24 Oct 2002 (age 23)	Al-Minaa Academy	116	25
10	Alaa Abdul-Zahra	(Iraq)	ST / AM	22 Dec 1987 (age 38)	Al-Shorta	30	11
11	Karrar Jaafar	(Iraq)	LW / ST / RW	26 Apr 2006 (age 20)	Al-Minaa Academy	80	15
19	Hamid Abdulla	(Iraq)	LW / AM	1 Apr 2001 (age 25)	Rosengård	35	2
20	André Alsanati	(Iraq)	RW / AM	6 Jan 2000 (age 26)	IK Sirius	21	2
26	Sajjad Alaa	(Iraq)	RW / ST	3 May 2003 (age 23)	Al-Minaa Academy	72	14
29	Tuisila Kisinda	(Democratic Republic of the Congo)	RW / RWB	20 Dec 1999 (age 26)	RS Berkane	36	2
88	Mohannad Abdul-Raheem	(Iraq)	ST / RW / AM	22 Sep 1993 (age 33)	Al-Quwa Al-Jawiya	28	5
90	Waziri Shentembo	(Tanzania)	ST	11 Aug 1996 (age 30)	Kinondoni	6	0
Players transferred out during this season
2	Raúl Parra	(Spain)	RB / CB	26 Nov 1999 (age 26)	Estoril	8	0
7	Lolo Plá	(Spain)	ST	7 Apr 1993 (age 33)	Talavera	18	4
8	Sumar Almadjed	(Iraq)	DM / CM	13 Mar 1996 (age 30)	Helsingborgs IF	13	1
13	Abdallah Amri	(Tunisia)	AM / CM	6 Sep 2001 (age 25)	CS Sfaxien	7	0

== New contracts and transfers ==
=== New contracts ===
Date	No.	Pos.	Name	Ref.
1 August 2024	18	RB	(Iraq) Hameed Ali Hameed	
5 August 2024	22	GK	(Iraq) Jaafar Shenaishil	
5 August 2024	7	AM	(Iraq) Ayad Abed Farhan	
7 August 2024	32	GK	(Iraq) Ammar Ali	
8 August 2024	26	RW	(Iraq) Sajjad Alaa	
9 August 2024	6	DM	(Iraq) Haider Salem	
12 August 2024	15	CM	(Iraq) Mohammed Khudhair	
12 August 2024	5	CB	(Iraq) Hussein Amer	
13 August 2024	40	CB	(Iraq) Mohammed Ghaleb	
13 August 2024	1	GK	(Iraq) Abed Saleem	
15 August 2024	4	CB	(Iraq) Mujtaba Ali	
16 August 2024	33	LB	(Iraq) Abbas Yas	
17 August 2024	9	ST	(Iraq) Salem Ahmed	
18 August 2024	11	LW	(Iraq) Karrar Jaafar	
18 August 2024	17	LB	(Iraq) Muslim Mousa	
22 August 2024	29	RB	(Iraq) Karrar Al-Amir Ali	

=== Transfers in ===
Date	Pos.	Name	From	Fee	Ref.
4 August 2024	AM	(Tunisia) Abdallah Amri	(Tunisia) CS Sfaxien	Free transfer	
5 August 2024	DM	(Gabon) Clech Loufilou	(Oman) Sur	Free transfer	
5 August 2024	LW	(Iraq) Hamid Abdulla	(Sweden) Rosengård	Free transfer	
8 August 2024	RW	(Democratic Republic of the Congo) Tuisila Kisinda	(Morocco) RS Berkane	Free transfer	
12 August 2024	ST	(Spain) Lolo Plá	(Spain) Talavera	Free transfer	
13 August 2024	CB	(Zimbabwe) Gerald Takwara	(Saudi Arabia) Ohod	Free transfer	
19 August 2024	DM	(Iraq) Amir Ahmed	(Iraq) Al-Naft	Free transfer	
26 August 2024	ST	(Iraq) Mohannad Abdul-Raheem	(Iraq) Al-Quwa Al-Jawiya	Free transfer	
26 August 2024	RB	(Spain) Raúl Parra	(Portugal) Estoril	Free transfer	
27 August 2024	ST	(Iraq) Alaa Abdul-Zahra	(Iraq) Al-Shorta	Free transfer	
28 August 2024	DM	(Iraq) Sumar Almadjed	(Sweden) Helsingborgs IF	Free transfer	
30 August 2024	RW	(Iraq) André Alsanati	(Sweden) IK Sirius	Loan	
4 September 2024	GK	(Iraq) Abbas Karim	(Iraq) Al-Shorta	Loan	
30 January 2025	DM	(Senegal) Ousseynou Thioune	(Cyprus) Anorthosis Famagusta	Free transfer	
31 January 2025	CM	(Yemen) Osama Anbar	(Iraq) Al-Kahrabaa	Free transfer	
6 February 2025	ST	(Tanzania) Waziri Shentembo	(Tanzania) Kinondoni	Free transfer	

=== Transfers out ===
Date	Pos.	Name	To	Fee	Ref.
27 July 2024	DM	(Nigeria) Dare Olatunji	(Iraq) Naft Maysan	Free transfer	
28 July 2024	ST	(Liberia) William Jebor	(Iraq) Karbalaa	Free transfer	
30 July 2024	CB	(Ivory Coast) Habib Omar Fofana	(Iraq) Diyala	Free transfer	
30 July 2024	DM	(Ivory Coast) Yusuf Touré	(Tunisia) Stade Tunisien	Free transfer	
12 August 2024	ST	(Iraq) Mohammed Shokan	Unattached	Released	
12 August 2024	CM	(Iraq) Hamza Hadi Ahmed	Unattached	Released	
18 August 2024	GK	(Iraq) Mohammed Saadoun	(Iraq) Masafi Al-Janoob	Free transfer	
11 September 2024	AM	(Iraq) Ayad Abed Farhan	(Iraq) Newroz	Free transfer	
13 September 2024	RB	(Iraq) Karrar Al-Amir Ali	(Iraq) Al-Bahri	Free transfer	
13 September 2024	LB	(Iraq) Hassan Odah	(Iraq) Al-Bahri	Free transfer	
15 September 2024	RW	(Iraq) Hatim Aysar	(Iraq) Al-Bahri	Free transfer	
16 September 2024	CB	(Iraq) Muntadhar Hassan	(Iraq) Al-Sinaat Al-Kahrabaiya	Free transfer	
20 September 2024	AM	(Iraq) Ahmed Mohsin Ashour	(Iraq) Al-Nasiriya	Free transfer	
25 September 2024	GK	(Iraq) Mohammed Sabah	(Iraq) Al-Gharraf	Free transfer	
3 October 2024	CB	(Iraq) Abdullah Mohsin	(Iraq) Masafi Al-Janoob	Free transfer	
9 October 2024	CB	(Iraq) Emad Yousef	(Iraq) Al-Samawa	Free transfer	
10 December 2024	RB	(Spain) Raúl Parra	(Spain) Eldense	Free transfer	
30 January 2025	AM	(Tunisia) Abdallah Amri	Unattached	Released	
1 February 2025	DM	(Iraq) Sumar Almadjed	(Sweden) Högaborgs BK	Released	
27 April 2025	ST	(Spain) Lolo Plá	Unattached	Released	

== Personnel ==
=== Technical staff ===
Position	Name
Manager	(Syria) Hussam Al Sayed
Assistant coach	(Iraq) Ahmed Rahim (Iraq) Nasser Talla Dahilan
Goalkeeping coach	(Iraq) Amer Abdul-Wahab
Fitness coach	(Iraq) Majed Abdul Hameed
Team supervisor	(Iraq) Adel Nasser

== Kits ==
Adidas were announced as Al-Minaa's kit supplier as of the start of the season.

Supplier: Adidas

Home	Away	Goalkeeper^{1}	Goalkeeper^{2}	Goalkeeper^{3}

== Pre-season and friendlies ==
On 3 September 2024, Al-Minaa arrived in Antalya to pre-season tour, which it started with a friendly against Süper Lig club Antalyaspor.

Win Draw Loss Fixtures

5 Sep 2024 Friendly	Antalyaspor (Turkey)	0–3	(Iraq) Al-Minaa	Antalya, Turkey
17:30 UTC+3		Report	Alaa; Abdul-Zahra; Lolo	Stadium: Akdeniz University Stadium

10 Sep 2024 Friendly	Al-Minaa (Iraq)	2–2	(Iraq) Al-Zawraa	Antalya, Turkey
17:00 UTC+3	Alaa; Lolo		Ghazi; Abdulkareem	Stadium: Antalya Atatürk Stadium

14 Sep 2024 Friendly	Kumlucablspor (Turkey)	0–1	(Iraq) Al-Minaa	Antalya, Turkey
16:30 UTC+3			Hameed	Stadium: Kumluca Ilçe Stadium

15 Oct 2024 Friendly	Al-Minaa (Iraq)	2–0	(Iraq) Al-Bahri	Basra, Iraq
17:00 UTC+3	Salem; Ahmed			Stadium: Al-Fayhaa Stadium

18 Oct 2024 Friendly	Al-Minaa (Iraq)	1–1	(Iraq) Masafi Al-Janoob	Basra, Iraq
17:00 UTC+3	Parra		Goal	Stadium: Al-Fayhaa Stadium

19 Oct 2024 Friendly	Al-Minaa (Iraq)	5–0	(Iraq) Al-Zubair	Basra, Iraq
17:00 UTC+3	Ahmed; Kisinda; Alsanati; Qahtan			Stadium: Al-Fayhaa Stadium

== Competitions ==
=== Overview ===
Competition	First match	Last match	Starting round	Record							
Competition	First match	Last match	Starting round	Pld	W	D	L	GF	GA	GD	Win %
Iraq Stars League	22 September 2024	2 July 2025	Matchday 1	38	11	10	17	39	44	−5	28.95
FA Cup	17 December 2024	8 July 2025	Third round	4	3	0	1	7	5	+2	75.00
Total				42	14	10	18	46	49	−3	33.33

Source: Competitions

=== League table ===
Pos	Team	Pld	W	D	L	GF	GA	GD	Pts	Qualification or relegation
14	Al-Najaf	38	12	12	14	40	36	+4	48	
15	Al-Karkh	38	12	10	16	40	49	−9	46	
16	Al-Minaa	38	11	10	17	39	44	−5	43	
17	Diyala	38	10	11	17	31	50	−19	41	
18	Naft Al-Basra (R)	38	8	8	22	32	58	−26	32	Qualification for the relegation play-off

Source: IPFL
Rules for classification: 1) points; 2) head-to-head points; 3) head-to-head goal difference; 4) goal difference; 5) number of goals scored; 6) number of wins.
(R) Relegated

==== Summary table ====
Overall								Home						Away					
Pld	W	D	L	GF	GA	GD	Pts	W	D	L	GF	GA	GD	W	D	L	GF	GA	GD
38	11	10	17	39	44	−5	43	8	5	6	25	21	+4	3	5	11	14	23	−9

Source: Goalzz.com

==== Results by matchday ====
Matchday	1	2	3	4	5	6	7	8	10	11	9^{1}	12	13	14	15	16	17	18	19	20	21	22	23	24	25	26	28	29	30	31	32	33	34	35	27^{2}	36	37	38
Ground	H	A	H	A	H	A	A	H	H	A	A	H	A	H	A	H	A	H	H	A	H	A	A	H	H	A	H	A	H	A	H	A	H	A	A	H	A	H
Result	W	L	L	L	W	L	D	D	W	D	D	W	L	W	L	D	L	L	L	L	D	L	W	D	W	L	L	W	L	W	D	D	W	L	D	L	L	W
Position	1	8	14	17	14	15	16	17	14	14	14	10	11	9	13	13	14	14	16	16	16	17	16	16	15	16	16	16	16	16	16	16	16	16	15	16	17	16

Source: Goalzz.com
A = Away; H = Home; W = Win; D = Draw; L = Loss; P = Postponed
Notes:
- ^{1} Matchday 9 (vs. Al-Shorta) was postponed to accommodate Al-Shorta's rearranged AFC Champions League Elite fixture against Al-Wasl.
- ^{2} Matchday 27 (vs. Duhok) was postponed to accommodate Duhok's rearranged AGCFF Gulf Club Champions League fixture against Al-Qadsia.

==== Matches ====
The league fixtures were announced on 17 September 2024.

Win Draw Loss Fixtures

22 September 2024 1	Al-Minaa	2–1	Al-Hudood	Basra
16:30 UTC+3	Jabbar 19' (o.g.); Almadjed 51'; Hameed (yellow card) 66'	Report	Karim (yellow card) 37'; Saleh 54'; Kurdistan (yellow card) 69'	Stadium: Al-Fayhaa Stadium; Referee: Laith Farhan

27 September 2024 2	Al-Quwa Al-Jawiya	2–1	Al-Minaa	Baghdad
17:30 UTC+3	Tahseen (yellow card) 55'; Hadi (yellow card) 68'; Abdul-Amir 88' (pen.); Nsayef (yellow card) 88' (yellow-red card) 90+10'; Saadoon 90+3', (yellow card) 90+3'; Waleed (yellow card) 90+7'	Report	Lolo 23'; Loufilou (yellow card) 36'; Yas (yellow card) 47'; Almadjed (yellow card) 86'; Hameed (yellow card) 90+7'	Stadium: Al-Shaab Stadium; Referee: Zaid Thamir

4 October 2024 3	Al-Minaa	1–2	Al-Karkh	Basra
20:00 UTC+3	Alsanati 1'; Loufilou (yellow card) 54'	Report	Nouader (yellow card) 51'; Kouvouama 72'; Nouri (yellow card) 77'; Eze 81'	Stadium: Al-Fayhaa Stadium; Referee: Haider Adwan

25 October 2024 4	Karbala	1–0	Al-Minaa	Karbala
15:15	Tariq 9', (yellow card) 45+4'; Saad (yellow card) 15'	Report		Stadium: Karbala International Stadium; Referee: Mohammed Salah

29 October 2024 5	Al-Minaa	1–0	Al-Zawraa	Basra
14:15	Alsanati 28'; Takwara (yellow card) 68'; Yas (yellow card) 76'; Hammad (yellow card) 85'	Report	Falah (yellow card) 12'; Nabeel (yellow card) 80'	Stadium: Al-Minaa Olympic Stadium; Referee: Ahmed Kadhim

2 November 2024 6	Al-Talaba	1–0	Al-Minaa	Baghdad
14:15	Msuva 16'; Talib (yellow card) 73'; Ndassi (yellow card) 85'; Tariq (yellow card) 90+6'	Report	Abdul-Zahra (yellow card) 71' (yellow-red card) 89'; Salem (yellow card) 79'; Yas (yellow card) 90+4'	Stadium: Al-Madina Stadium; Referee: Salem Amer

7 November 2024 7	Diyala	1–1	Al-Minaa	Al-Anbar
11:30	Okoronkwo 9'; Nangolo (yellow card) 31'; Fofana (yellow card) 40'	Report	Lolo 30' (pen.)	Stadium: Al-Ramadi Stadium; Referee: Wathiq Mohammed

27 November 2024 8	Al-Minaa	0–0	Zakho	Maysan
11:00	Almadjed (yellow card) 19'; Amer (yellow card) 90+8'	Report	Abbood (yellow card) 41'; Al-Aswad (red card) 54'; Moisés (yellow card) 64'; Jamil (yellow card) 89'; Nadhim (yellow card) 90+8'	Stadium: Maysan Olympic Stadium; Referee: Mohammed Salman

5 December 2024 10	Al-Minaa	3–0	Erbil	Maysan
11:30	Salem (yellow card) 10'; Abdul-Zahra 18', (yellow card) 45+2'; Mousa 59', 73'; Hameed (yellow card) 60'	Report	Hélio (yellow card) 39'; Kourdoghli (yellow card) 52'; Rahim (yellow card) 83'	Stadium: Maysan Olympic Stadium; Referee: Alaa Salam

10 December 2024 11	Al-Qasim	0–0	Al-Minaa	Wasit
11:30		Report	Ali (yellow card) 71'	Stadium: Al-Kut Olympic Stadium; Referee: Ayad Zahem

29 December 2024 9	Al-Shorta	1–1	Al-Minaa	Baghdad
14:00	Al-Saedi (yellow card) 35'; Al-Mawas 76', (yellow card) 77'; Shakir (yellow card) 78'; Dawood (yellow card) 81'; Raed (yellow card) 90+8'	Report	Salem (yellow card) 73'; Yas (yellow card) 79'; Ali (yellow card) 82', (goal) 90+3'; Abdul-Zahra (yellow card) 88'; Loufilou (yellow card) 90+8'	Stadium: Al-Shaab Stadium; Referee: Mohammed Salman
Note: This match was originally scheduled to take place on 30 November 2024, but was postponed due to Al-Shorta's participation in the AFC Champions League Elite.

2 January 2025 12	Al-Minaa	1–0	Naft Maysan	Basra
16:30	Mousa 64'; Hameed (yellow card) 79' (yellow-red card) 90+5'; Saleem (yellow card) 88'; Salem (yellow card) 89'; Loufilou (yellow card) 90+2'	Report	Lateef (yellow card) 35'; Sale (yellow card) 90+2'; Mutar (yellow card) 90+5'	Stadium: Al-Fayhaa Stadium; Referee: Faid Karim

7 January 2025 13	Al-Naft	1–0	Al-Minaa	Baghdad
11:30	S.Yassin (yellow card) 71'; Khalid (yellow card) 66'; Sabri 86' (pen.); A.Yassin (yellow card) 89'	Report	Ahmed (yellow card) 71'	Stadium: Al-Saher Ahmed Radhi Stadium; Referee: Ali Hussein

13 January 2025 14	Al-Minaa	2–0	Naft Al-Basra	Basra
14:00	Ali 39'; Abdul-Raheem 75' (pen.); Loufilou (yellow card) 90+2'	Report		Stadium: Al-Fayhaa Stadium; Referee: Wathiq Mohammed

19 January 2025 15	Al-Najaf	3–2	Al-Minaa	Najaf
14:00	Maknzi 20', (yellow card) 29'; Atiemwen 38', (yellow card) 56'; Ghariani 46'; Naeem (yellow card) 63'; Abdul-Aziz (yellow card) 90+7'	Report	Almadjed (yellow card) 6'; Lolo 53'; Abdul-Raheem 78'	Stadium: Al-Najaf International Stadium; Referee: Yousef Saeed

24 January 2025 16	Al-Minaa	1–1	Duhok	Basra
14:00	Abdul-Raheem 47'; Abdul-Zahra (penalty missed) 73'; Ali (red card) 90+9'	Report	Zakri (yellow card) 23'; Abubakir (yellow card) 38'; Lucas (yellow card) 71'; Masies (yellow card) 90+6'; Ghazi 90+8'	Stadium: Al-Fayhaa Stadium; Referee: Ahmed Kadhim

30 January 2025 17	Al-Kahrabaa	2–1	Al-Minaa	Baghdad
11:30	Adel (yellow card) 20'; Kadhim (yellow card) 44'; Mohammed 59', (penalty missed) 77', 90+5', (yellow card) 90+10'; Kenani (yellow card) 90+8'; Abdul-Kaim (yellow card) 90+9'	Report	Abdul-Zahra 23', (yellow card) 68'; Salem (yellow card) 28'; Hameed (red card) 57'; Saleem (yellow card) 58'; Amer (yellow card) 74'; Loufilou (yellow card) 84'	Stadium: Al-Zawraa Stadium; Referee: Sajjad Khalid

4 February 2025 18	Al-Minaa	1–5	Newroz	Basra
14:00	Ali (red card) 74'; Lolo 84' (pen.)	Report	Marwan 39', 44', 62', (yellow card) 45+2'; Maradona 64'; Rostam 68'	Stadium: Al-Fayhaa Stadium; Referee: Mohammed Salman

8 February 2025 19	Al-Minaa	0–2	Al-Karma	Basra
14:00	Loufilou (yellow card) 85'	Report	Abdul-Ridha 24'; Razzaq (yellow card) 43'; Adnan 83'; Al-Baqer (yellow card) 88'	Stadium: Al-Fayhaa Stadium; Referee: Wathiq Mohammed

15 February 2025 20	Al-Hudood	3–2	Al-Minaa	Baghdad
11:30	Farouk 24'; Dacosta (yellow card) 30'; Antwi 53', 88', (yellow card) 51'	Report	Ali (yellow card) 6' (yellow-red card) 90+5'; Abdul-Zahra 17', 45+6'; Abdul-Raheem (yellow card) 25'; Hameed (yellow card) 90+2'	Stadium: Al-Saher Ahmed Radhi Stadium; Referee: Ahmed Jumaa

19 February 2025 21	Al-Minaa	0–0	Al-Qasim	Basra
14:00	Anbar (yellow card) 24'; Loufilou (yellow card) 56'; Yas (yellow card) 80'; Takwara (yellow card) 90+3'	Report	Odeni (yellow card) 62'; Ali (yellow card) 73'; Hatim (yellow card) 90+1'	Stadium: Al-Fayhaa Stadium; Referee: Mohammed Tariq

3 March 2025 22	Zakho	1–0	Al-Minaa	Duhok
17:30	Moisés (yellow card) 25'; Attwan (yellow card) 35'; Deputy (yellow card) 65'; Gustavo 77' (pen.), (yellow card) 90+1'	Report	Takwara (yellow card) 7'; Hameed (yellow card) 90+6'	Stadium: Zakho International Stadium; Referee: Mohammed Salman

7 March 2025 23	Erbil	0–1	Al-Minaa	Erbil
18:15		Report	Hameed (yellow card) 28'; Takwara (yellow card) 78'; Jaafar 89', (yellow card) 90+2'; Loufilou (yellow card) 90+4'	Stadium: Franso Hariri Stadium; Referee: Zaid Thamir

12 March 2025 24	Al-Minaa	1–1	Al-Najaf	Basra
21:30 UTC+3	Abdul-Zahra 6' (pen.); Loufilou (yellow card) 47'; Salem (yellow card) 81'	Report	Qasim 58'	Stadium: Al-Fayhaa Stadium; Referee: Mohammed Salah

29 March 2025 25	Al-Minaa	2–0	Al-Naft	Basra
21:30 UTC+3	Abdul-Zahra 2'; Takwara 48'	Report	Khalid (yellow card) 21'; Hussein (yellow card) 38'	Stadium: Al-Minaa Olympic Stadium; Referee: Ahmed Kadhim

2 April 2025 26	Newroz	1–0	Al-Minaa	Sulaymaniyah
21:00 UTC+3	Sadeq (yellow card) 45+5'; Fariq 87'	Report	Abdul-Zahra (yellow card) 12' (yellow-red card) 43'; Yas (yellow card) 89'	Stadium: Newroz International Stadium; Referee: Ali Hussein

17 April 2025 28	Al-Minaa	0–1	Al-Shorta	Basra
19:30 UTC+3	Thioune (yellow card) 48'; Salem (yellow card) 90+3'	Report	Raed (yellow card) 39'; Mouddane (yellow card) 44' (yellow-red card) 45+1'; Salem 81' (o.g.)	Stadium: Al-Minaa Olympic Stadium; Referee: Wathiq Mohammed

22 April 2025 29	Naft Al-Basra	0–1	Al-Minaa	Basra
17:00 UTC+3	Fofana (yellow card) 10'; Ouro-Agoro (red card) 64'; Abdul-Jalil (yellow card) 73'; Jumaa (yellow card) 80'; Malik (yellow card) 83'; Farhan (yellow card) 87'	Report	Kisinda 49'; Abdulla (yellow card) 88'	Stadium: Al-Fayhaa Stadium; Referee: Mohammed Salman

27 April 2025 30	Al-Minaa	0–2	Al-Kahrabaa	Basra
17:00 UTC+3	Loufilou (yellow card) 53'; Jaafar (yellow card) 82'	Report	Abdul-Karim 50'; Kenani (yellow card) 51' (yellow-red card) 61'; Mohammed 59'; Khalid (yellow card) 67'	Stadium: Al-Minaa Olympic Stadium; Referee: Laith Farhan

3 May 2025 31	Al-Karma	0–1	Al-Minaa	Al-Anbar
20:30 UTC+3		Report	Thioune (yellow card) 63'; Abdulla 63'; Kisinda (yellow card) 77'; Ahmed (yellow card) 87'	Stadium: Al-Ramadi Stadium; Referee: Ahmed Kadhim

8 May 2025 32	Al-Minaa	2–2	Al-Quwa Al-Jawiya	Basra
18:00 UTC+3	Abdulla 14'; Abdul-Zahra 40'; Thioune (yellow card) 43'; Jaafar (yellow card) 68'; Kisinda (yellow card) 81'	Report	Jawad 32', (yellow card) 75'; Alaa (yellow card) 45+1'; Oloumou (yellow card) 49'; Al-Sabhi 90+3'; Isaiah (yellow card) 90+7'	Stadium: Al-Minaa Olympic Stadium; Referee: Zaid Thamir

14 May 2025 33	Al-Karkh	1–1	Al-Minaa	Baghdad
18:00 UTC+3	Okoronkwo 58' (pen.); Eze (yellow card) 76'; Saleh (yellow card) 85'; Lucas (yellow card) 88'	Report	Abdul-Zahra 60'; Thioune (yellow card) 73'; Hameed (yellow card) 73'; Alaa (yellow card) 87'	Stadium: Al-Saher Ahmed Radhi Stadium; Referee: Yousef Saeed

19 May 2025 34	Al-Minaa	3–1	Karbala	Basra
20:30 UTC+3	Thioune (yellow card) 2'; Ahmed 9'; Ali (yellow card) 36'; Hameed 39'; Abdul-Zahra (yellow card) 45+1', (goal) 90+2'	Report	Faris (yellow card) 10'; Ouattara (yellow card) 11'; Tariq 81'	Stadium: Al-Fayhaa Stadium; Referee: Ali Hussein Ali

13 June 2025 35	Naft Maysan	2–0	Al-Minaa	Maysan
18:00 UTC+3	Saad 13' (pen.), (yellow card) 15'; Afolabi 40'; Lateef (yellow card) 63'	Report		Stadium: Maysan Olympic Stadium; Referee: Mohammed Salman

17 June 2025 27	Duhok	1–1	Al-Minaa	Duhok
19:00 UTC+3	Ghazi 31' (pen.); Ageed (yellow card) 90+1'	Report	Thioune (yellow card) 27'; Abdul-Zahra 42' (pen.); Yas (yellow card) 79'; Loufilou (yellow card) 90'; Jaafar (yellow card) 90+4'	Stadium: Duhok Stadium; Referee: Laith Farhan
Note: This match was originally scheduled to take place on 10 April 2025, but was postponed due to Duhok's participation in the AGCFF Gulf Club Champions League.

21 June 2025 36	Al-Minaa	2–3	Al-Talaba	Basra
21:30 UTC+3	Kisinda 10', (yellow card) 49'; Mousa (yellow card) 67'; Salem (yellow card) 73' (yellow-red card) 90+6'; Abdul-Raheem 78'	Report	Amutu (yellow card) 18' (yellow-red card) 52'; Al-Ani 19' (pen.), 40'; Oueslati 50'; Talib (yellow card) 90+1'	Stadium: Al-Fayhaa Stadium; Referee: Mohanad Qasim

25 June 205 37	Al-Zawraa	2–1	Al-Minaa	Baghdad
18:30 UTC+3	Tomiwa 20' (pen.); Jalil (yellow card) 22'; Mohammed 49'; Hassan (yellow card) 74'; Abdulkareem (yellow card) 90+6'	Report	Thioune (yellow card) 1'; Abdul-Zahra 24'; Mousa (yellow card) 45+3'; Amer (yellow card) 90+4'	Stadium: Al-Zawraa Stadium; Referee: Mohammed Salah

2 July 2025 38	Al-Minaa	3–0	Diyala	Basra
21:30 UTC+3	Loufilou (yellow card) 25'; Ali 41'; Salem (yellow card) 45'; Abdul-Raheem 68'; Jaafar 79'	Report	Muhaisen (yellow card) 21'; Jaffal (yellow card) 46'	Stadium: Al-Fayhaa Stadium; Referee: Mohammed Sadeq

=== FA Cup ===
17 December 2024 First round	Al-Minaa	2–0	Al-Kufa	Basra
14:30 UTC+3	Ghaleb (yellow card) 20'; Amri 23'; Abdul-Raheem 43'; Loufilou (yellow card) 83'	Report	Raed (yellow card) 42'; Kadhim (yellow card) 83'	Stadium: Al-Bahri Stadium; Referee: Mohannad Munaf

25 December 2024 Second round	Al-Minaa	3–2	Diyala	Basra
14:30 UTC+3	Abdul-Zahra 45+1' (pen.); Amri (yellow card) 45+3'; Abdulla 52', (yellow card) 65'; Loufilou (yellow card) 57'; Ahmed 70'	Report	Okoronkwo 26'; Jamal (yellow card) 28'; Moloko (yellow card) 32'; Ali Khalid (yellow card) 54'; Nangolo 80'; Aws Khalid (yellow card) 84'; Karim (yellow card) 90+7'	Stadium: Al-Fayhaa Stadium; Referee: Amjad Kamel

26 February 2025 Round of 16	Al-Minaa	1–0	Al-Zawraa	Basra
14:30 UTC+3	Abdul-Zahra 35'; Kisinda (yellow card) 69'; Loufilou (yellow card) 79'; Saleem (yellow card) 90+5'	Report	Yousif (penalty missed) 80'	Stadium: Al-Minaa Olympic Stadium; Referee: Ahmed Kadhim

8 July 2025 Quarter-finals	Duhok	3–1	Al-Minaa	Duhok
19:00 UTC+3	Ageed 45+3'; Darwiche (yellow card) 17', (goal) 68' (pen.); Ghazi 90+6' (pen.)	Report	Amer (yellow card) 8'; Ali 23', (yellow card) 67'	Stadium: Duhok Stadium; Referee: Zaid Thamir

== Statistics ==
=== Appearances ===
thirty-five players made their appearances for Al-Minaa's first team during the season.

Player^{#}: Player who was registered as an Al-Minaa U21, U19 or U17 player during the season.

Includes all competitions for senior teams.

2024–25 season
No.	Pos.	Player	IS League	FA Cup	total
1	GK	(Iraq) Abed Saleem	36	3	39
4	DF	(Iraq) Mujtaba Ali	14+3	2+2	16+5
5	DF	(Iraq) Hussein Amer	12+6	2	14+6
6	MF	(Iraq) Haider Salem	29+3	3	32+3
9	FW	(Iraq) Salem Ahmed	9+9	0+2	9+11
10	FW	(Iraq) Alaa Abdul-Zahra	28+2	4	32+2
11	MF	(Iraq) Karrar Jaafar	18+8	0+4	18+12
12	MF	(Iraq) Hassan Hamed^{#}	0+1	0	0+1
14	MF	(Iraq) Zain Al-Abidin Jassim^{#}	1+4	0+1	1+5
15	MF	(Yemen) Osama Anbar	7+4	2	9+4
16	FW	(Iraq) Muntadher Qahtan^{#}	0+2	0	0+2
17	DF	(Iraq) Muslim Mousa	25+1	3+1	28+2
18	DF	(Iraq) Hameed Ali Hameed	15+7	1+1	16+8
19	MF	(Iraq) Hamid Abdulla	21+14	3	24+14
20	MF	(Iraq) André Alsanati	12+9	1	13+9
21	GK	(Iraq) Abbas Karim	1	0	1
22	GK	(Iraq) Jaafar Shenaishil	1	1	2
25	MF	(Iraq) Amir Ahmed	1+6	0	1+6
26	FW	(Iraq) Sajjad Alaa	2+14	0	2+14
27	MF	(Senegal) Ousseynou Thioune	14+1	0+1	14+2
29	FW	(Democratic Republic of the Congo) Tuisila Kisinda	29+7	4	33+7
31	DF	(Zimbabwe) Gerald Takwara	28+2	1	29+2
33	MF	(Iraq) Abbas Yas	33+2	4	37+2
37	FW	(Iraq) Hussein Makki^{#}	0+1	0	0+1
39	MF	(Iraq) Naji Nasser^{#}	0+1	0	0+1
40	DF	(Iraq) Mohammed Ghaleb	1+1	1	2+1
55	DF	(Iraq) Mohammed Qasim^{#}	0+1	0	0+1
66	DF	(Iraq) Mahdi Hashim^{#}	1+4	0	1+4
79	MF	(Gabon) Clech Loufilou	35	4	39
88	FW	(Iraq) Mohannad Abdul-Raheem	12+16	3+1	17+17
90	FW	(Tanzania) Waziri Shentembo	1+5	0	1+5
Players who departed the club permanently but featured this season
2	DF	(Spain) Raúl Parra	8	0	8
7	FW	(Spain) Lolo Plá	14+4	0+2	14+6
8	MF	(Iraq) Sumar Almadjed	8+5	0+1	8+6
13	MF	(Tunisia) Abdallah Amri	3+4	2	5+4

=== Goalscorers ===
The following fourteen players scored for Al-Minaa's first team during the season.

Includes all competitions for senior teams. The list is sorted by squad number when season-total goals are equal. Players with no goals not included in the list.

2024–25 season
Rank	No.	Pos	Nat	Name	IS League	FA Cup	Total
1	10	FW	(Iraq)	Alaa Abdul-Zahra	11	2	13
2	88	FW	(Iraq)	Mohannad Abdul-Raheem	5	1	6
3	4	DF	(Iraq)	Mujtaba Ali	3	1	4
3	7	FW	(Spain)	Lolo Plá	4	0	4
4	8	DF	(Iraq)	Muslim Mousa	3	0	3
4	18	MF	(Iraq)	Hamid Abdulla	2	1	3
5	9	FW	(Iraq)	Salem Ahmed	1	1	2
5	11	MF	(Iraq)	Karrar Jaafar	2	0	2
5	20	MF	(Iraq)	André Alsanati	2	0	2
5	29	MF	(Democratic Republic of the Congo)	Tuisila Kisinda	2	0	2
6	8	MF	(Iraq)	Sumar Almadjed	1	0	1
6	13	MF	(Tunisia)	Abdallah Amri	0	1	1
6	18	DF	(Iraq)	Hameed Ali Hameed	1	0	1
6	31	DF	(Zimbabwe)	Gerald Takwara	1	0	1
Own goals					1	0	1
TOTALS					38	7	45

=== Assists ===
The following thirteen players registered their assists for Al-Minaa's first team during the season.

Includes all competitions for senior teams. The list is sorted by squad number when season-total assists are equal. Players with no assists not included in the list.

2024–25 season
Rank	No.	Pos	Nat	Name	IS League	FA Cup	Total
1	19	MF	(Iraq)	Hamid Abdulla	5	0	5
2	11	MF	(Iraq)	Karrar Jaafar	4	0	4
2	29	MF	(Democratic Republic of the Congo)	Tuisila Kisinda	2	2	4
2	33	DF	(Iraq)	Abbas Yas	3	1	4
3	10	FW	(Iraq)	Alaa Abdul-Zahra	2	1	3
4	18	DF	(Iraq)	Hameed Ali Hameed	2	0	2
4	20	MF	(Iraq)	André Alsanati	2	0	2
4	79	MF	(Gabon)	Clech Loufilou	2	0	2
5	7	FW	(Spain)	Lolo Plá	1	0	1
5	9	FW	(Iraq)	Salem Ahmed	1	0	1
5	14	MF	(Iraq)	Zain Al-Abidin Jassim	1	0	1
5	17	DF	(Iraq)	Muslim Mousa	1	0	1
5	88	FW	(Iraq)	Mohannad Abdul-Raheem	1	0	1
TOTALS					27	4	31

=== Disciplinary record ===
Includes all competitions for senior teams. The list is sorted by red cards, then yellow cards (and by squad number when total cards are equal). Players with no cards not included in the list.

Rk.	No.	Pos.	Player	IS League			FA Cup			Total		
Rk.	No.	Pos.	Player	Yellow card	Second yellow card	Red card	Yellow card	Second yellow card	Red card	Yellow card	Second yellow card	Red card
1	4	DF	(Iraq) Mujtaba Ali	3	1	2	1	0	0	4	1	2
2	18	DF	(Iraq) Hameed Ali Hameed	5	1	1	0	0	0	5	1	1
3	10	FW	(Iraq) Alaa Abdul-Zahra	4	2	0	0	0	0	4	2	0
4	6	DF	(Iraq) Haider Salem	8	1	0	0	0	0	8	1	0
5	79	MF	(Gabon) Clech Loufilou	11	0	0	3	0	0	14	0	0
6	27	MF	(Senegal) Ousseynou Thioune	7	0	0	0	0	0	7	0	0
7	33	DF	(Iraq) Abbas Yas	6	0	0	0	0	0	6	0	0
8	1	GK	(Iraq) Abed Saleem	3	0	0	1	0	0	4	0	0
8	5	DF	(Iraq) Hussein Amer	3	0	0	1	0	0	4	0	0
8	11	MF	(Iraq) Karrar Jaafar	4	0	0	0	0	0	4	0	0
8	29	MF	(Democratic Republic of the Congo) Tuisila Kisinda	3	0	0	1	0	0	4	0	0
8	31	DF	(Zimbabwe) Gerald Takwara	4	0	0	0	0	0	4	0	0
9	8	MF	(Iraq) Sumar Almadjed	2	0	0	0	0	0	2	0	0
9	17	DF	(Iraq) Muslim Mousa	2	0	0	0	0	0	2	0	0
10	9	FW	(Iraq) Salem Ahmed	1	0	0	0	0	0	1	0	0
10	13	MF	(Tunisia) Abdallah Amri	0	0	0	1	0	0	1	0	0
10	19	MF	(Iraq) Hamid Abdulla	1	0	0	0	0	0	1	0	0
10	25	MF	(Iraq) Amir Ahmed	1	0	0	0	0	0	1	0	0
10	26	MF	(Iraq) Sajjad Alaa	1	0	0	0	0	0	1	0	0
10	40	DF	(Iraq) Mohammed Ghaleb	1	0	0	0	0	0	1	0	0
10	88	FW	(Iraq) Mohannad Abdul-Raheem	1	0	0	0	0	0	1	0	0
Total				69	5	3	8	0	0	77	5	3

=== Clean sheets ===
Goalkeepers with no clean sheets not included in the list.

Rank	Nat	No.	Name	IS League	FA Cup	Total
1	(Iraq)	1	Abed Saleem	11	1	12
2	(Iraq)	21	Abbas Karim	1	0	1
2	(Iraq)	22	Jaafar Shenaishil	0	1	1
TOTALS				12	2	14

=== Captains ===
Includes all competitions for senior teams. The list is sorted by squad number when season-total number of games where a player started as captain are equal. Players with no games started as captain not included in the list.

2024–25 season
Rk.	No.	Pos.	Nat	Player	IS League	FA Cup	Total
1	10	FW	(Iraq)	Alaa Abdul-Zahra	28	4	32
2	88	FW	(Iraq)	Mohannad Abdul-Raheem	4	0	4
3	8	MF	(Iraq)	Sumar Almadjed	2	0	2
3	33	DF	(Iraq)	Abbas Yas	2	0	2
3	9	FW	(Iraq)	Salem Ahmed	2	0	2
TOTALS					38	4	42

=== International call-ups ===
The following Three Al-Minaa players (excluding players who departed the club permanently or on loan) were named in their respective countries' senior squads for international fixtures during the season.

The list is sorted by national team and player, respectively. Players with no senior national team call-ups not included in the list.

National team	Player	Pos.	Debut	Caps	Goals	Latest call-up
Gabon	Clench Loufilou	MF	2018	14	0	March 2025
Yemen	Osama Anbar	MF	2015	15	0	March 2025
Zimbabwe	Gerald Takwara	DF	2015	20	0	March 2025
