= 2024–25 Iraq Stars League =

51st season of the Iraq Stars League

Iraq Stars League
- Season: 2024–25
- Dates: 20 September 2024 – 4 July 2025
- Champions: Al-Shorta (8th title)
- Relegated: Naft Al-Basra; Al-Hudood; Karbala
- AFC Champions League Elite: Al-Shorta
- AFC Champions League Two: Al-Zawraa
- AGCFF Gulf Club Champions League: Zakho
- Matches: 380
- Goals: 862 (2.27 per match)
- Top goalscorer: Mohanad Ali (27 goals)
- Biggest home win: Zakho 5–0 Karbala (5 October 2024)
- Biggest away win: Diyala 0–6 Al-Shorta (26 September 2024)
- Highest scoring: Zakho 6–2 Al-Qasim (9 February 2025)
- Longest winning run: 9 matches Al-Shorta
- Longest unbeaten run: 17 matches Al-Shorta
- Longest winless run: 17 matches Diyala; Karbala
- Longest losing run: 9 matches Karbala

The 2024–25 Iraq Stars League was the 51st season of the highest tier football league in Iraq since its establishment in 1974, and the second season since launching as a professional league under the name Iraq Stars League. The season started on 20 September 2024 and ended on 4 July 2025, with the relegation play-off held on 14 July 2025.

Al-Shorta became the first team in history to win the league title four times in a row, finishing ten points ahead of runners-up Al-Zawraa. Al-Shorta sealed the title with two games to spare after defeating Naft Al-Basra 3–1.

== Overview ==
20 teams competed in the 2024–25 Iraq Stars League: 18 teams from the previous season, as well as Diyala and Al-Karma who were promoted from the 2023–24 Iraqi Premier Division League, replacing Amanat Baghdad and Naft Al-Wasat who were relegated. Diyala returned to the top-flight after a 13-year absence, while Al-Karma played in the top-flight for the first time in history this season.

== Teams ==
Locations of the 2024–25 Iraq Stars League teams

=== Stadiums and locations ===
Team	Location	Stadium	Capacity
Al-Hudood	Baghdad (14 July)	Al-Saher Ahmed Radhi Stadium	5,150
Al-Kahrabaa	Baghdad (Al-Wazireya Al-Sinaaiya)	Al-Zawraa Stadium	15,443
Al-Karkh	Baghdad (Al-Mansour)	Al-Saher Ahmed Radhi Stadium	5,150
Al-Karma	Anbar (Al-Karma)	Al-Ramadi Stadium	10,000
Al-Minaa	Basra (Maqal)	Al-Minaa Olympic Stadium	30,000
Al-Naft	Baghdad (Shaab)	Al-Saher Ahmed Radhi Stadium	5,150
Al-Najaf	Najaf	Al-Najaf International Stadium	30,000
Al-Qasim	Babil (Al-Qasim)	Al-Najaf International Stadium	30,000
Al-Quwa Al-Jawiya	Baghdad (Zayouna)	Al-Shaab Stadium	35,700
Al-Shorta	Baghdad (Zayouna)	Al-Shaab Stadium	35,700
Al-Talaba	Baghdad (Hayy Qahira)	Al-Madina Stadium	32,000
Al-Zawraa	Baghdad (Sheikh Maaruf, Al-Shaljiya)	Al-Zawraa Stadium	15,443
Diyala	Diyala (Baquba)	Al-Madina Stadium	32,000
Duhok	Duhok	Duhok Stadium	22,800
Erbil	Erbil	Franso Hariri Stadium	25,000
Karbala	Karbala	Karbala International Stadium	30,000
Naft Al-Basra	Basra (Al-Khadhraa)	Al-Fayhaa Stadium	10,000
Naft Maysan	Maysan (Amara)	Maysan Olympic Stadium	25,000
Newroz	Sulaymaniya	Newroz Stadium	14,500
Zakho	Duhok (Zakho)	Zakho International Stadium	20,000

=== Personnel and kits ===
Team	Manager	Captain	Kit manufacturer	Shirt sponsor
Al-Hudood	(Iraq) Hamza Hadi	(Iraq) Saqr Ajail	(Germany) Jako	none
Al-Kahrabaa	(Iraq) Radhi Shenaishil	(Iraq) Hussam Kadhim	(Germany) Jako	none
Al-Karkh	(Iraq) Ahmad Abdul-Jabar	(Iraq) Jafar Obeis	(Spain) Kelme	none
Al-Karma	(Iraq) Ahmed Khalaf	(Iraq) Mohammed Hameed	(Spain) Kelme	Al-Rahma Telecom
Al-Minaa	(Syria) Hussam Al Sayed	(Iraq) Alaa Abdul-Zahra	(Germany) Adidas	none
Al-Naft	(Iraq) Adel Nima	(Iraq) Ali Yaseen	(Iraq) Al-Naft (own brand)	none
Al-Najaf	(Iraq) Wali Kareem	(Iraq) Mohammed Jassim	(Germany) Adidas	none
Al-Qasim	(Syria) Ayman Hakeem	(Iraq) Hussein Abdul-Wahed	Kaka Sport	none
Al-Quwa Al-Jawiya	(Iraq) Ali Abdul-Jabbar	(Iraq) Saad Abdul-Amir	(Spain) Kelme	none
Al-Shorta	(Egypt) Moamen Soliman	(Iraq) Mohanad Ali	(Iraq) Qitharah (own brand)	none
Al-Talaba	(Iraq) Basim Qasim	(Iraq) Saad Natiq	(Spain) Kelme	Al-Manasa IPTV
Al-Zawraa	(Iraq) Haider Obeid	(Iraq) Jalal Hassan	(Germany) Adidas	none
Diyala	(Tunisia) Yamen Zelfani	(Iraq) Kosrat Baez	(Spain) Kelme	Alrabiaa Network Television
Duhok	(Iraq) Soliman Ramadan	(Iraq) Bayar Abubakir	(Spain) Kelme	First Iraqi Bank
Erbil	(Iraq) Samir Babo	(Iraq) Sherko Karim	(Germany) Puma	Korek Telecom
Karbala	(Iraq) Abbas Attiya	(Iraq) Ali Salih	Kaka Sport	none
Naft Al-Basra	(Iraq) Emad Aoda	(Iraq) Hussam Malik	(Iraq) Naft Al-Basra (own brand)	none
Naft Maysan	(Iraq) Hussein Abdul-Wahed	(Iraq) Akram Rahim	(Iraq) Naft Maysan (own brand)	none
Newroz	(Iraq) Qahtan Chathir	(Iraq) Mohammed Delawar	(Germany) Puma	none
Zakho	(Iraq) Abdul-Ghani Shahad	(Iraq) Amjad Attwan	(Denmark) Hummel	none

=== Managerial changes ===
Team	Outgoing manager	Manner of departure	Date of vacancy	Position in the table	Incoming manager	Date of appointment
Al-Hudood	(Iraq) Adel Nima	Mutual consent	End of previous season	Pre-season	(Iraq) Haidar Abdul-Amir	Start of current season
Al-Kahrabaa	(Iraq) Luay Salah	Mutual consent	End of previous season	Pre-season	(Iraq) Wali Karim	Start of current season
Al-Karma	(Iraq) Natiq Haddad	Mutual consent	End of previous season	Pre-season	(Iraq) Ghazi Fahad	Start of current season
Al-Minaa	(Iraq) Hassan Ahmed	Mutual consent	End of previous season	Pre-season	(Spain) Pablo Grandes	Start of current season
Al-Naft	(Iraq) Basim Qasim	Mutual consent	End of previous season	Pre-season	(Iraq) Adel Nima	Start of current season
Al-Quwa Al-Jawiya	(Iraq) Razzaq Farhan	Mutual consent	End of previous season	Pre-season	(Qatar) Wesam Rizik	Start of current season
Al-Shorta	(Egypt) Moamen Soliman	Mutual consent	End of previous season	Pre-season	(Iraq) Ahmed Salah	Start of current season
Al-Talaba	(Iraq) Qahtan Chathir	Mutual consent	End of previous season	Pre-season	(Iraq) Basim Qasim	Start of current season
Duhok	(Iraq) Ahmed Khalaf	Mutual consent	End of previous season	Pre-season	(Sweden) Mesut Meral	Start of current season
Karbala	(Iraq) Chasib Sultan	Mutual consent	End of previous season	Pre-season	(Spain) Carlos Hernandez	Start of current season
Naft Al-Basra	(Jordan) Haitham Al-Shboul	Mutual consent	End of previous season	Pre-season	(Croatia) Andrej Panadić	Start of current season
Newroz	(Syria) Nizar Mahrous	Mutual consent	End of previous season	Pre-season	(Brazil) Jorvan Vieira	Start of current season
Karbala	(Spain) Carlos Hernandez	Mutual consent	Prior to the start of the season	Pre-season	(Iraq) Hassan Ahmed	Start of current season
Diyala	(Iraq) Sadeq Hanoon	Sacked	3 November 2024	19th	(Tunisia) Yamen Zelfani	12 November 2024
Al-Hudood	(Iraq) Haidar Abdul-Amir	Sacked	4 November 2024	20th	(Iraq) Thair Jassam	5 November 2024
Al-Quwa Al-Jawiya	(Qatar) Wesam Rizik	Sacked	5 December 2024	7th	(Iraq) Luay Salah	6 December 2024
Al-Shorta	(Iraq) Ahmed Salah	Sacked	8 December 2024	8th	(Egypt) Mohamed Azima	7 January 2025
Newroz	(Brazil) Jorvan Vieira	Sacked	12 December 2024	18th	(Iraq) Qahtan Chathir	13 December 2024
Al-Karkh	(Egypt) Haitham Shaaban	Sacked	15 January 2025	18th	(Iraq) Ahmad Abdul-Jabar	15 January 2025
Naft Al-Basra	(Croatia) Andrej Panadić	Mutual consent	27 January 2025	18th	(Iraq) Emad Aoda	30 March 2025
Al-Karma	(Iraq) Ghazi Fahad	Resigned	30 January 2025	14th	(Iraq) Ahmed Khalef	30 January 2025
Al-Kahrabaa	(Iraq) Wali Karim	Resigned	30 January 2025	13th	(Iraq) Radhi Shenaishil	31 January 2025
Al-Minaa	(Spain) Pablo Grandes	Sacked	8 February 2025	15th	(Syria) Hussam Al Sayed	21 February 2025
Al-Zawraa	(Iraq) Essam Hamad	Sacked	26 February 2025	2nd	(Iraq) Haider Obeid	26 February 2025
Al-Shorta	(Egypt) Mohamed Azima	Mutual consent	10 March 2025	3rd	(Egypt) Moamen Soliman	17 March 2025
Naft Maysan	(Iraq) Ali Abdul-Jabbar	Resigned	31 March 2025	8th	(Iraq) Hussein Abdul-Wahed	12 April 2025
Al-Quwa Al-Jawiya	(Iraq) Luay Salah	Mutual consent	2 April 2025	4th	(Iraq) Ali Abdul-Jabbar	6 April 2025
Karbala	(Iraq) Hassan Ahmed	Sacked	4 April 2025	19th	(Iraq) Abbas Attiya	6 April 2025
Al-Hudood	(Iraq) Thair Jassam	Resigned	5 April 2025	20th	(Iraq) Hamza Hadi	5 April 2025
Al-Najaf	(Iraq) Abdul-Ghani Shahad	Resigned	21 April 2025	12th	(Iraq) Wali Kareem	23 April 2025
Zakho	(Qatar) Talal Al-Bloushi	Resigned	26 April 2025	3rd	(Iraq) Abdul-Ghani Shahad	28 April 2025
Duhok	(Sweden) Mesut Meral	Resigned	19 May 2025	7th	(Sweden) Amir Azrafshan	24 May 2025
Duhok	(Sweden) Amir Azrafshan	Resigned	29 June 2025	8th	(Iraq) Soliman Ramadan	29 June 2025

== Registration rules ==
The rules for the squad selection of the Iraq Stars League:

- Each team must submit a 25-man squad for the league.
- Each team must have no more than six foreign players in their squad. This restriction does not apply to players from Yemen, and does not apply to a maximum of one player from Syria.
- Each team must have no more than six foreign players on the pitch at any given time.
- No more than two players from countries that are outside the top 90 in the FIFA Men's World Rankings can play at any given time. The two permitted players from countries outside the top 90 must be capped for their respective national teams.
- Teams are not permitted to sign a foreign goalkeeper.
- Players registered for reserve or youth teams are not required to be registered in the 25-man squad.

=== Transfer windows ===
The summer transfer window in Iraq started on 2 August and ended on 2 October 2024, while the winter transfer window started on 5 January and ended on 5 February 2025.

== League table ==
Pos	Team	Pld	W	D	L	GF	GA	GD	Pts	Qualification or relegation
1	Al-Shorta (C)	38	26	9	3	75	23	+52	87	Qualification for the AFC Champions League Elite league stage
2	Al-Zawraa	38	23	8	7	56	28	+28	77	Qualification for the AFC Champions League Two group stage (Note: Duhok, the 2024–25 Iraq FA Cup winners, were not granted an AFC license. Therefore, their AFC Champions League Two spot was passed to the league runners-up Al-Zawraa, and the AGCFF Gulf Club Champions League spot was passed to the league's third-placed team Zakho.)
3	Zakho	38	20	11	7	57	25	+32	71	Qualification for the AGCFF Gulf Club Champions League group stage
4	Al-Talaba	38	18	9	11	40	27	+13	63	
5	Al-Quwa Al-Jawiya	38	17	9	12	51	43	+8	60	
6	Al-Naft	38	15	14	9	32	27	+5	59	
7	Duhok	38	16	9	13	45	41	+4	57	
8	Al-Karma	38	15	11	12	43	35	+8	56	
9	Newroz	38	14	11	13	46	41	+5	53	
10	Al-Qasim	38	13	13	12	43	43	0	52	
11	Naft Maysan	38	14	9	15	42	46	−4	51	
12	Erbil	38	15	5	18	49	61	−12	50	
13	Al-Kahrabaa	38	12	13	13	39	41	−2	49	
14	Al-Najaf	38	12	12	14	40	36	+4	48	
15	Al-Karkh	38	12	10	16	40	49	−9	46	
16	Al-Minaa	38	11	10	17	39	44	−5	43	
17	Diyala	38	10	11	17	31	50	−19	41	
18	Naft Al-Basra (R)	38	8	8	22	32	58	−26	32	Qualification for the relegation play-off
19	Al-Hudood (R)	38	8	2	28	37	79	−42	26	Relegation to the Iraqi Premier Division League
20	Karbala (R)	38	4	10	24	26	66	−40	22	Relegation to the Iraqi Premier Division League

Source: IPFL
Rules for classification: 1) points; 2) head-to-head points; 3) head-to-head goal difference; 4) goal difference; 5) number of goals scored; 6) number of wins.
(C) Champions; (R) Relegated

== Results ==
Home \ Away	HUD	KAH	KKH	KRM	MIN	NFT	NJF	QSM	QWJ	SHR	TLB	ZWR	DYL	DHK	ERB	KRB	NFB	NFM	NEW	ZAK
Al-Hudood		2–1	2–1	0–3	3–2	0–1	0–1	2–4	2–3	0–1	1–3	0–2	1–0	1–4	0–1	0–1	0–3	1–0	1–2	1–3
Al-Kahrabaa	1–2		2–0	4–1	2–1	1–1	0–0	2–1	0–0	0–1	1–2	0–1	1–1	1–0	3–1	1–1	2–0	1–0	2–1	0–3
Al-Karkh	1–1	1–1		0–1	1–1	1–1	1–0	0–0	1–1	1–2	1–4	2–1	3–1	2–4	2–4	2–1	1–0	0–2	2–2	1–1
Al-Karma	3–1	1–1	0–1		0–1	0–2	1–0	1–0	2–1	0–4	1–1	0–0	0–0	1–0	1–0	0–0	0–0	1–2	2–0	0–0
Al-Minaa	2–1	0–2	1–2	0–2		2–0	1–1	0–0	2–2	0–1	2–3	1–0	3–0	1–1	3–0	3–1	2–0	1–0	1–5	0–0
Al-Naft	2–0	0–0	1–0	0–0	1–0		0–0	1–0	0–1	0–2	0–0	2–1	2–0	1–0	0–2	1–0	2–0	0–0	1–1	2–0
Al-Najaf	3–1	2–0	0–1	0–3	3–2	1–1		1–0	4–0	0–0	2–0	1–2	2–0	0–1	1–2	3–2	0–0	4–1	0–1	0–0
Al-Qasim	3–2	0–0	1–1	1–3	0–0	0–0	1–2		1–1	2–2	0–0	2–0	1–0	2–1	4–0	1–0	2–1	1–2	1–0	0–2
Al-Quwa Al-Jawiya	2–0	2–2	0–1	1–0	2–1	0–0	3–0	0–1		1–2	1–1	1–2	1–1	4–0	1–2	1–0	2–1	4–2	2–0	1–0
Al-Shorta	3–1	2–0	1–0	2–2	1–1	4–0	1–0	2–2	4–0		1–0	0–1	1–0	0–0	4–1	4–0	3–1	3–3	2–2	0–1
Al-Talaba	1–0	1–0	1–0	2–0	1–0	1–0	2–1	1–0	1–1	0–2		1–2	0–0	0–0	2–1	2–0	0–1	1–1	3–1	0–0
Al-Zawraa	3–2	3–0	2–1	2–0	2–1	3–1	1–1	1–2	3–1	0–0	1–0		1–0	1–2	4–0	1–0	3–0	1–0	1–0	2–3
Diyala	2–0	1–2	2–1	0–0	1–1	0–0	0–0	0–1	1–0	0–6	0–1	1–1		2–1	1–0	1–0	2–2	3–1	1–4	1–4
Duhok	1–1	0–0	1–3	3–1	1–1	1–0	1–1	2–0	1–0	1–3	1–0	0–1	3–1		0–1	2–1	1–0	0–0	1–4	1–0
Erbil	3–1	4–3	1–3	1–1	0–1	2–3	0–0	0–1	0–2	0–2	1–0	1–1	2–1	2–1		3–1	4–1	3–2	0–1	0–0
Karbala	2–3	0–0	1–1	0–2	1–0	2–4	1–1	3–3	1–4	0–1	0–2	1–3	2–2	0–3 (Note: The Karbala–Duhok match was ended during injury time with the score at 2–1 to Duhok after assistant referee Hussein Falah was hit with a stone thrown by a Karbala fan and taken to hospital. The match was subsequently awarded as a 3–0 win for Duhok.)	0–2		2–1	1–3	0–0	1–0
Naft Al-Basra	3–1	2–1	1–0	0–5	0–1	0–0	0–3 (Note: The Naft Al-Basra–Al-Najaf match originally ended in a 0–0 draw but was changed to a 3–0 win for Al-Najaf due to Naft Al-Basra fielding the ineligible player Habib Omar Fofana.)	2–2	1–2	1–3	0–2	0–0	1–0	0–1	4–3	0–0		0–1	2–0	2–3
Naft Maysan	3–1	2–0	1–2	3–2	2–0	0–0	3–1	0–1	0–1	0–4	1–0	0–2	0–1	0–2	1–1	0–0	1–0		1–0	1–1
Newroz	1–2	1–1	1–0	1–3	1–0	0–1	2–1	1–1	0–1	0–1	1–0	1–1	2–1	3–1	2–0	1–0	1–1	2–2		0–0
Zakho	4–0	0–1	2–0	1–0	1–0	2–1	1–0	6–2	2–0	2–0	2–1	0–0	0–1	2–2	3–1	5–0	2–1	0–1	1–1	

Source: IPFL
Legend: Blue = home team win; Yellow = draw; Red = away team win.
For upcoming matches, an "a" indicates there is an article about the rivalry between the two participants.

== Relegation play-off ==
The 18th-placed team in the Stars League competed in a play-off with the winner of the play-out round between the 3rd and 4th-placed teams from the Premier Division League for a place in next season's Stars League. If the match ended in a draw after 90 minutes, there would be no extra time played and the game would go straight to a penalty shootout.

14 July 2025
20:00 UTC+3

Naft Al-Basra	0–1	Amanat Baghdad
		Karim 79'

Al-Shaab Stadium, Baghdad
Referee: Adham Makhadmeh (Jordan)

Amanat Baghdad are promoted to the Iraq Stars League, while Naft Al-Basra are relegated to the Iraqi Premier Division League.

== Season statistics ==
=== Top scorers ===
Rank	Player	Team	Goals
1	(Iraq) Mohanad Ali	Al-Shorta	27
2	(Brazil) Gustavo Henrique	Zakho	17
2	(Iraq) Marwan Hussein	Newroz	17
4	(Iraq) Saif Rasheed	Al-Qasim	15
4	(Nigeria) Ifeanyi Eze	Al-Karkh	15

==== Hat-tricks ====
Player	For	Against	Result	Date	Reference
(Iraq) Mohanad Ali	Al-Shorta	Diyala	6–0 (A)	26 September 2024	
(Iraq) Mohanad Ali	Al-Shorta	Erbil	4–1 (H)	4 January 2025	
(Iraq) Marwan Hussein	Newroz	Al-Minaa	5–1 (A)	4 February 2025	
(Brazil) Gustavo Henrique	Zakho	Al-Qasim	6–2 (H)	9 February 2025	
(Iraq) Mohanad Ali	Al-Shorta	Naft Maysan	4–0 (A)	13 March 2025	
(Niger) Youssouf Oumarou	Al-Karma	Al-Qasim	3–1 (A)	7 May 2025	
(Iraq) Mohammed Jawad	Al-Quwa Al-Jawiya	Karbala	4–1 (A)	13 May 2025	

Notes

(H) – Home team
(A) – Away team

== Awards ==
=== Manager of the Month ===
Month	Manager	Team	Reference
October	(Iraq) Adel Nima	Al-Naft	
November	(Iraq) Ghazi Fahad	Al-Karma	
February	(Qatar) Talal Al-Bloushi	Zakho	
March	(Qatar) Talal Al-Bloushi	Zakho	
April	(Syria) Ayman Hakeem	Al-Qasim	
May	(Iraq) Ahmed Khalaf	Al-Karma	
June	(Iraq) Ahmed Khalaf	Al-Karma	
