= 2024–25 Iraq FA Cup =

Tournament details
- Country: Iraq
- Dates: 17 December 2024 – 18 July 2025
- Teams: 42

Final positions
- Champions: Duhok (1st title)
- Runners-up: Zakho

Tournament statistics
- Matches played: 41
- Goals scored: 90 (2.2 per match)
- Top goal scorer(s): Karim Darwich (5 goals)

The 2024–25 Iraq FA Cup was the 35th edition of the Iraqi knockout football cup as a club competition, the main domestic cup in Iraqi football. 42 clubs from the top three tiers of the Iraqi football league system participated in the competition.

The tournament began on 17 December 2024 with the first round, which was played between the ten lowest-placed clubs from the Iraq Stars League, all 20 clubs from the Iraqi Premier Division League and the two highest-placed clubs from the Iraqi First Division League based on league positions in the 2023–24 season. The next four highest-placed clubs from the Iraq Stars League entered the competition in the second round, while the top six Iraq Stars League clubs received a bye to the Round of 16.

The winners of the competition were Duhok, who won their first title by beating Zakho 5–3 on penalties after a 0–0 draw in the final.

== Schedule ==
The rounds of the 2024–25 competition were scheduled as follows:

Round	Fixtures draw date	Stadiums draw date	Match dates
First round	11 December 2024		17–18 December 2024
Second round	19 December 2024		24–25 December 2024
Round of 16	21 February 2025		26–27 February 2025
Quarter-finals	21 February 2025	22 June 2025	8 July 2025
Semi-finals	21 February 2025	22 June 2025	12 July 2025
Final	21 February 2025	—	18 July 2025

== First round ==
This round features 10 teams from the Stars League (level 1), 20 teams from the Premier Division League (level 2) and 2 teams from the First Division League (level 3). Newroz, Al-Talaba, Al-Hudood and Naft Maysan received byes to the second round.

17 December 2024	Al-Minaa (1)	2–0	Al-Kufa (3)	Basra
13:45 UTC+3				Stadium: Al-Bahri Stadium

17 December 2024	Al-Kadhimiya (2)	0–2	Naft Al-Basra (1)	Baghdad
13:45 UTC+3				Stadium: Al-Kadhimiya Stadium

17 December 2024	Al-Kahrabaa (1)	1–0	Al-Ramadi (2)	Kut
13:45 UTC+3				Stadium: Al-Kut Olympic Stadium

17 December 2024	Al-Karma (1)	2–0	Masafi Al-Wasat (2)	Ramadi
13:45 UTC+3				Stadium: Al-Ramadi Stadium

17 December 2024	Al-Etisalat (2)	1–2	Al-Qasim (1)	Baghdad
13:45 UTC+3				Stadium: Al-Taji Stadium

17 December 2024	Erbil (1)	3–1	Samarra (3)	Erbil
17:00 UTC+3				Stadium: Franso Hariri Stadium

17 December 2024	Diyala (1)	2–1	Naft Al-Wasat (2)	Baghdad
17:00 UTC+3				Stadium: Al-Madina Stadium

17 December 2024	Al-Naft (1)	5–0	Al-Nasiriya (2)	Baghdad
17:00 UTC+3				Stadium: Al-Saher Ahmed Radhi Stadium

18 December 2024	Al-Gharraf (2)	1–0	Al-Sinaa (2)	Suq Al-Shuyukh
13:45 UTC+3				Stadium: Suq Al-Shuyukh Stadium

18 December 2024	Afak (2)	0–2	Maysan (2)	Afak
13:45 UTC+3				Stadium: Afak Stadium

18 December 2024	Al-Hussein (2)	1–0	Al-Bahri (2)	Baghdad
13:45 UTC+3				Stadium: Five Thousand Stadium

18 December 2024	Peshmerga Sulaymaniya (2)	1–1 (3–0 p)	Al-Fahad (2)	Sulaymaniya
13:45 UTC+3				Stadium: Peshmerga Stadium

18 December 2024	Ghaz Al-Shamal (2)	1–1 (4–5 p)	Masafi Al-Junoob (2)	Kirkuk
13:45 UTC+3				Stadium: Ghaz Al-Shamal Stadium

18 December 2024	Al-Jolan (2)	1–1 (4–5 p)	Al-Mosul (2)	Falluja
13:45 UTC+3				Stadium: Al-Falluja Stadium

18 December 2024	Karbala (1)	2–0	Al-Sinaat Al-Kahrabaiya (2)	Karbala
17:00 UTC+3				Stadium: Karbala International Stadium

18 December 2024	Al-Karkh (1)	1–1 (2–4 p)	Amanat Baghdad (2)	Baghdad
17:00 UTC+3				Stadium: Al-Saher Ahmed Radhi Stadium

== Second round ==
This round features 13 teams from the Stars League (level 1) and 7 teams from the Premier Division League (level 2). Al-Shorta, Al-Quwa Al-Jawiya, Al-Zawraa, Al-Najaf, Zakho and Duhok received byes to the Round of 16.

24 December 2024	Karbala (1)	0–0 (2–4 p)	Peshmerga Sulaymaniya (2)	Karbala
13:45 UTC+3				Stadium: Karbala International Stadium

24 December 2024	Al-Gharraf (2)	1–2	Al-Talaba (1)	Suq Al-Shuyukh
13:45 UTC+3				Stadium: Suq Al-Shuyukh Stadium

24 December 2024	Amanat Baghdad (2)	4–2	Al-Hudood (1)	Baghdad
13:45 UTC+3				Stadium: Amanat Baghdad Stadium

24 December 2024	Naft Al-Basra (1)	0–1	Newroz (1)	Basra
13:45 UTC+3				Stadium: Al-Fayhaa Stadium

24 December 2024	Al-Mosul (2)	0–0 (5–4 p)	Erbil (1)	Akre
13:45 UTC+3				Stadium: Akre Stadium

25 December 2024	Maysan (2)	0–0 (4–2 p)	Al-Naft (1)	Majar Al-Kabir
13:45 UTC+3				Stadium: Al-Majar Stadium

25 December 2024	Al-Kahrabaa (1)	0–0 (2–4 p)	Al-Hussein (2)	Kut
13:45 UTC+3				Stadium: Al-Kut Olympic Stadium

25 December 2024	Al-Karma (1)	0–0 (4–3 p)	Masafi Al-Junoob (2)	Baghdad
13:45 UTC+3				Stadium: Al-Saher Ahmed Radhi Stadium

25 December 2024	Naft Maysan (1)	1–2	Al-Qasim (1)	Maysan
13:45 UTC+3				Stadium: Maysan Olympic Stadium

25 December 2024	Al-Minaa (1)	3–2	Diyala (1)	Basra
13:45 UTC+3				Stadium: Al-Fayhaa Stadium

== Final phase ==
=== Bracket ===
Round of 16
Duhok	3
Maysan	0
Al-Minaa	1
Al-Zawraa	0
Al-Quwa Al-Jawiya	2
Al-Qasim	1
Al-Najaf	3
Peshmerga Sulaymaniya	2
Zakho	2
Al-Karma	0
Newroz (p)	2 (3)
Al-Hussein	2 (2)
Al-Shorta (a.e.t.)	1
Al-Mosul	0
Al-Talaba (a.e.t.)	2
Amanat Baghdad	0

Quarter-finals
Duhok	3
Al-Minaa	1
Al-Quwa Al-Jawiya	3
Al-Najaf	1
Zakho	1
Newroz	0
Al-Shorta (p)	1 (4)
Al-Talaba	1 (1)

Semi-finals
Duhok	3
Al-Quwa Al-Jawiya	1
Zakho (p)	0 (4)
Al-Shorta	0 (3)

Final
Duhok (p)	0 (5)
Zakho	0 (3)

== Round of 16 ==
This round features 11 teams from the Stars League (level 1) and 5 teams from the Premier Division League (level 2).

26 February 2025	Al-Minaa (1)	1–0	Al-Zawraa (1)	Basra
16:15 UTC+3	Abdul-Zahra 35'			Stadium: Al-Fayhaa Stadium

26 February 2025	Al-Najaf (1)	3–2	Peshmerga Sulaymaniya (2)	Najaf
16:15 UTC+3	Mendy 14' (pen.); Qasim 24'; Hachim 46'		Hussein 27' (pen.); Kamran 75' (pen.)	Stadium: Al-Najaf International Stadium

26 February 2025	Al-Quwa Al-Jawiya (1)	2–1	Al-Qasim (1)	Baghdad
19:30 UTC+3	Abdul-Amir 28' (pen.), 70'		Rasheed 90+3'	Stadium: Al-Shaab Stadium

26 February 2025	Duhok (1)	3–0	Maysan (2)	Duhok
19:30 UTC+3	Darwich 45+2', 82'; Ghazi 83'			Stadium: Duhok Stadium

27 February 2025	Newroz (1)	2–2 (a.e.t.) (3–2 p)	Al-Hussein (2)	Sulaymaniya
14:00 UTC+3	Fariq 7'; Dridi 28'		Chasib 34' (pen.); Mohammed 89'	Stadium: Newroz International Stadium

27 February 2025	Al-Talaba (1)	2–0 (a.e.t.)	Amanat Baghdad (2)	Baghdad
14:00 UTC+3	Amutu 98', 117'			Stadium: Al-Madina Stadium

27 February 2025	Al-Shorta (1)	1–0 (a.e.t.)	Al-Mosul (2)	Baghdad
17:00 UTC+3	Jassim 119' (pen.)			Stadium: Al-Shaab Stadium

27 February 2025	Zakho (1)	2–0	Al-Karma (1)	Zakho
19:30 UTC+3	Mohammedoh 60'; Deputy 61'			Stadium: Zakho International Stadium

== Quarter-finals ==
All remaining teams are from the Stars League (level 1).

8 July 2025	Al-Quwa Al-Jawiya	3–1	Al-Najaf	Baghdad
19:00 UTC+3	Jawad 10'; Oloumou 45+2'; Abdul-Amir 69'		Mendy 27'	Stadium: Al-Shaab Stadium

8 July 2025	Duhok	3–1	Al-Minaa	Duhok
19:00 UTC+3	Ageed 45+3'; Darwich 68' (pen.); Ghazi 90+6' (pen.)		Ali 23'	Stadium: Duhok Stadium

8 July 2025	Zakho	1–0	Newroz	Zakho
22:30 UTC+3	Al-Gahwashi 75'			Stadium: Zakho International Stadium

8 July 2025	Al-Shorta	1–1 (a.e.t.) (4–1 p)	Al-Talaba	Baghdad
22:30 UTC+3	Moumouni 50'; Zero (yellow card) 7' (yellow-red card) 60'		Amutu 76'	Stadium: Al-Shaab Stadium
	Penalties
	Jassim (penalty scored); Ben Mcharek (penalty scored); Farhan (penalty scored); Dawood (penalty scored)		(penalty scored) El Ani; (penalty missed) Abdul-Kadhim; (penalty missed) Msuva

== Semi-finals ==
12 July 2025	Duhok	3–1	Al-Quwa Al-Jawiya	Duhok
20:00 UTC+3	Darwich 15', 88'; Ahmed 90+5'		Jawad 48'; Polo (yellow card) 59' (yellow-red card) 60'	Stadium: Duhok Stadium

12 July 2025	Zakho	0–0 (a.e.t.) (4–3 p)	Al-Shorta	Zakho
20:00 UTC+3				Stadium: Zakho International Stadium
	Penalties
	Attwan (penalty scored); Al-Gahwashi (penalty scored); Deputy (penalty missed); Abu Hashish (penalty scored); Henrique (penalty scored)		(penalty missed) Jassim; (penalty missed) Santos; (penalty scored) Dawood; (penalty scored) Al-Youssef; (penalty scored) Farhan

== Final ==
18 July 2025
20:00 UTC+3

Duhok	0–0 (a.e.t.)	Zakho
		Patrick (yellow card) 25' (yellow-red card) 65'
Penalties
Ageed (penalty scored); Zakri (penalty scored); Ghazi (penalty scored); Younis (penalty scored); Darwich (penalty scored)	5–3	(penalty scored) Attwan; (penalty scored) Abu Hashish; (penalty missed) Abbood; (penalty scored) Haji Nori

Al-Shaab Stadium, Baghdad
Referee: Salman Falahi (Qatar)

Iraq FA Cup
2024–25 winner
Duhok
1st title
