= Masies Artien =

Iraqi footballer (born 1993)

Personal information
- Date of birth: 8 August 1993 (age 33)
- Place of birth: Baghdad, Iraq
- Height: 1.88 m (6 ft 2 in)
- Position: Defender

Team information
- Current team: Al-Zawraa

Youth career
- Argon

Senior career*
Years	Team	Apps	(Gls)
2011–2013	Argon		
2013-2014	Eindhoven	3	(0)
2014	Gandzasar	0	(0)
2014–2015	Montfoort		
2015–2016	Genemuiden		
2016–2022	Rijnsburgse Boys	141	(9)
2022–2024	Spakenburg	64	(1)
2025	Duhok	13	(0)
2025–2026	Al-Talaba		
2026–	Al-Zawraa	3	(0)

International career^{‡}
2023–	Iraq	1	(0)
- * Club domestic league appearances and goals as of 09:02, 4 March 2024 (UTC) ‡ National team caps and goals as of 09:02, 4 March 2024 (UTC)

Masies Artien (born 8 August 1993) is an Iraqi footballer who plays as a defender for Al-Zawraa and the Iraq national team

== Club career ==
Artien started his career with Dutch fourth tier side Argon, where he suffered consecutive relegations to the Dutch sixth tier and helped them win the 2013 KNVB Amateur Cup. In 2013, Artien signed for FC Eindhoven in the Dutch second tier, where he made three appearances. On 4 October 2013, he debuted for FC Eindhoven during a 3–2 win over FC Den Bosch.

Before the second half of 2013–14, Artien signed for Armenian club Gandzasar, but left due to payment problems. In 2014, he signed for Montfoort in the Dutch fifth tier, where he suffered relegation to the Dutch sixth tier. In 2016, Artien signed for Dutch fourth tier team Rijnsburgse Boys, helping them earn promotion to the Dutch third tier.

On 4 January 2022, Spakenburg announced that Artien had signed with the club from the 2022–23 season.

== International career ==
Artien is eligible to represent Armenia and Iraq internationally, having been born in Iraq. He debuted with the Iraq national team in a friendly 2–2 (7–6) penalty shootout win over Thailand at the Kings Cup on 10 September 2023.

== Honours ==
Duhok

- Iraq FA Cup: 2024–25
- AGCFF Gulf Club Champions League: 2024–25
