= Najran S.FC =

Association football club in Najran, Saudi Arabia

Najran SC
- Full name: Najran Sport Club
- Nickname: Mared Al-Janoub (Giant of the South)
- Founded: 23 June 1980; 46 years ago
- Ground: Prince Hathloul Sports City Stadium
- Capacity: 3,000
- Chairman: Saleh Al Haidar
- Manager: Pablo Grandes
- League: Second Division
- 2024–25: Second Division, 7th of 16, Group A
Home colours	Away colours

Najran Sport Club (Arabic: نادي نجران الرياضي) is a Saudi Arabian professional football club based in Najran Province, that competes in the Saudi Second Division League, regional league.

== Overview ==
Najran SC achieved promotion to the Saudi Premier League by finishing 2nd in the Saudi First Division during the 2006–07 season.

== The beginning ==
Najran Club is a new club compared to other Saudi clubs. The idea of establishing the club was first born in 1980 when a group of Najranis raised a request to the Youth Welfare office expressing their desire in establishing a club that carried the name of their city. Efforts were harnessed to achieve this quest that was just an idea till the approval of the general president of the Youth Welfare at that time, his royal highness prince Faisal bin Fahad bin Abdulaziz was issued. Accordingly, the founders of the club held a meeting to form and elect the first board of directors.

== Achievements ==
The Najran team was able to reach the final match of the prince Faisal Bin Fahad cup 2005–06 for the first division.

The Najran team was finally able to qualify to the Saudi Premier League in the 2007–08 season.

They were able to reach the final four in the 2009–10 Saudi Crown Prince Cup after defeating some of the strongest teams in Saudi football such as Al-Ittihad, but lost to Al-Hilal 1–2 after an impressive display.

== Current squad ==
As of 21 June 2025:

Note: Flags indicate national team as defined under FIFA eligibility rules; some limited exceptions apply. Players may hold more than one non-FIFA nationality.

No.	Pos.	Nation	Player
3	DF	KSA	Hussain Al Julaydan
5	MF	KSA	Abdulaziz Al-Barak
7	MF	KSA	Bandar Al-Ahmari
8	MF	KSA	Jalawy Al-Yami
10	MF	IRQ	Sajjad Alaa
12	DF	KSA	Hussain Habkor
14	DF	TUN	Bassem Ben Aissa
21	MF	KSA	Mansour Hashel

No.	Pos.	Nation	Player
22	DF	KSA	Hamad Al-Sayyaf
24	DF	KSA	Bakhit Al Faraj
25	GK	KSA	Nasser Al-Saiari
28	DF	KSA	Ahmed Al-Qarni
29	DF	KSA	Rihan Hamsal
30	FW	GHA	Frederick Acheampong
87	DF	KSA	Abdullah Al Faraj
94	FW	KSA	Omar Al-Ruwaili
99	FW	KSA	Hassan Al-Buraiki
—	GK	KSA	Hamed Al-Qahtani
—	DF	KSA	Qassem Sharahili

== Managers ==
- (Tunisia) Mourad Okbi (August 1, 2002 – April 30, 2004)
- (Tunisia) Rashed ben Ammar (September 25, 2004 – May 30, 2005)
- (Tunisia) Fathi Al-Jabal (August 7, 2005 – March 12, 2007)
- (Saudi Arabia) Yahya Khuraim (caretaker) (March 12, 2007 – March 23, 2007)
- (Tunisia) Samir Sellimi (March 23, 2007 – May 30, 2007)
- (Tunisia) Lotfi Benzarti (May 28, 2007 – December 21, 2007)
- (Serbia) Ivica Todorov (December 23, 2007 – May 1, 2008)
- (Romania) Costică Ștefănescu (July 1, 2008 – December 21, 2008)
- (Tunisia) Mokhtar Tlili (January 9, 2009 – May 1, 2009)
- (Argentina) Marcelo Zuleta (July 22, 2009 – October 6, 2009)
- (Tunisia) Samir Jouili (October 6, 2009 – January 11, 2010)
- (Tunisia) Mourad Okbi (January 11, 2010 – October 30, 2010)
- (Portugal) José Rachão (October 30, 2010 – June 30, 2011)
- (North Macedonia) Gjoko Hadžievski (July 1, 2011 – May 6, 2012)
- (Serbia) Miodrag Ješić (May 31, 2012 – January 2, 2013)
- (Tunisia) Khemais Labidi (January 6, 2013 – March 1, 2013)
- (Saudi Arabia) Al Hasan Al-Yami (caretaker) (March 1, 2013 – March 6, 2013)
- (North Macedonia) Gjoko Hadžievski (March 6, 2013 – January 9, 2014)
- (Syria) Nizar Mahrous (January 10, 2014 – June 1, 2014)
- (France) Denis Lavagne (June 8, 2014 – August 24, 2014)
- (Belgium) Marc Brys (August 25, 2014 – September 24, 2014)
- (Tunisia) Abdelhay Laatiri (caretaker) (September 24, 2014 – October 8, 2014)
- (Algeria) Fouad Bouali (October 8, 2014 – May 19, 2015)
- (Tunisia) Fathi Al-Jabal (June 27, 2015 – December 17, 2015)
- (Saudi Arabia) Al Hasan Al-Yami (caretaker) (December 17, 2015 – December 28, 2015)
- (Brazil) Hélio dos Anjos (December 28, 2015 – May 23, 2016)
- (Egypt) Ahmed Hafez (July 15, 2016 – September 25, 2016)
- (Tunisia) Mohammed Al-Ayari (September 25, 2016 – February 8, 2018)
- (Tunisia) Adel Latrach (February 9, 2018 – March 23, 2018)
- (Egypt) Ramzy El Morsy (March 23, 2018 – May 4, 2018)
- (Saudi Arabia) Hamood Al-Saiari (May 8, 2018 – May 31, 2018)
- (Sweden) Zvezdan Milošević (June 13, 2018 – September 21, 2018)
- (Egypt) Ramzy El Morsy (caretaker) (September 21, 2018 – October 3, 2018)
- (Tunisia) Habib Ben Romdhane (October 3, 2018 – June 1, 2019)
- (Brazil) Heron Ferreira (June 22, 2019 – November 8, 2019)
- (Egypt) Ramzy El Morsy (caretaker) (November 8, 2019 – November 14, 2019)
- (Tunisia) Chokri Khatoui (November 14, 2019 – June 23, 2020)
- (Saudi Arabia) Abdullah Al Haidar (June 23, 2020 – September 21, 2020)
- (Portugal) Paulo Gomes (October 18, 2020 – February 5, 2021)
- (Saudi Arabia) Bandar Basraih (February 5, 2021 – June 1, 2021)
- (Tunisia) Saïd Saïbi (June 21, 2021 – October 21, 2021)
- (Saudi Arabia) Abdullah Al Haidar (caretaker) (October 21, 2021 – November 5, 2021)
- (Tunisia) Afouène Gharbi (November 6, 2021 – September 19, 2022)
- (France) Laurent Hagist (September 22, 2022 – February 3, 2023)
- (North Macedonia) Gjoko Hadžievski (February 3, 2023 – May 31, 2023)
- (Tunisia) Moncef Mcharek (June 18, 2023 – December 3, 2023)
- (Tunisia) Abdelwahab Elharaby (December 3, 2023 – December 19, 2024)
- (Tunisia) Ferid Ben Belgacem (December 19, 2024 – June 1, 2025)
- (Spain) Pablo Grandes (August 13, 2025 – )

== See also ==
- List of football clubs in Saudi Arabia
