= Abdullah Al Haidar =

Saudi Arabian footballer

Personal information
- Full name: Abdullah Faisal Al Haidar
- Date of birth: 25 August 1984 (age 42)
- Place of birth: Saudi Arabia
- Position: Midfielder

Youth career
- Najran SC

Senior career*
| Years | Team | Apps | (Gls) |
| 2004–2009 | Najran | | |
| 2009–2011 | Al-Hazem | | |
| 2011 | → Najran (loan) | | |
| 2014–2016 | Al-Akhdoud | | |

Managerial career
- 2019–2020: Habouna FC
- 2020: Najran SC
- 2021: Najran SC (caretaker)
- * Club domestic league appearances and goals

Abdullah Al Haidar (Arabic: عبدالله آل حيدر; born 25 August 1984) is a Saudi Arabian former footballer who played as a midfielder. He is currently the manager of Najran SC.
