= Saïd Saïbi =

Tunisian football manager

Personal information
- Date of birth: 6 April 1975 (age 51)

Senior career*
Years	Team	Apps	(Gls)
–2005	Stade Tunisien		
2005–2006	CA Bizertin		
2006	ES Zarzis		
2006–2007	ES Hammam-Sousse		

Managerial career
- 2020–2021: AS Rejiche
- 2021: Najran SC
- 2022-2023: Club Africain
- * Club domestic league appearances and goals

Saïd Saïbi (born 4 June 1975) is a Tunisian football manager and former player.
