= Amir Ahmed =

Iraqi footballer (born 2001)

Personal information
- Full name: Amir Ahmed Abdulwahid
- Date of birth: 6 January 2001 (age 25)
- Place of birth: Baghdad, Iraq
- Height: 1.74 m (5 ft 9 in)
- Position: Midfielder

Team information
- Current team: Al-Fahad
- Number: 25

Youth career
- –2019: Al-Shorta

Senior career*
| Years | Team | Apps | (Gls) |
| 2019–2023 | Al-Hudood | | |
| 2023–2024 | Al-Naft | | |
| 2024–2025 | Al-Minaa | 7 | (0) |
| 2025–2026 | Al-Hudood | | |
| 2026 | Al-Jolan | | |
| 2026– | Al-Fahad | | |

International career^{‡}
| 2023– | Iraq U23 | 4 | (0) |
Medal record
Men's football
Representing Iraq
AFC U-23 Asian Cup
| Bronze medal – third place | 2024 Qatar | Team |
- * Club domestic league appearances and goals as of 8 May 2025 ‡ National team caps and goals as of 27 September 2024

Amir Ahmed Abdulwahid (Arabic: أَمِير أَحْمَد عَبْد الْوَاحِد; born 6 January 2001) is an Iraqi professional footballer who plays as a midfielder for Iraqi Premier Division League side Al-Fahad.

== Club career ==
Ahmed started playing football at the Al-Shorta, then he moved to Al-Hudood, and helped the team win the Iraqi Premier Division League in the 2021–22 season and they were promoted to the Iraq Stars League. In August 2023, he broke his contract with his club and moved to play with Al-Naft, where he signed a one-season contract with them. He was a key player in the team's starting lineup.

In August 2024, he moved to Al-Minaa and signed a two-season contract with them.

== International career ==
Ahmed was first picked to represent Iraq in 2023, when the under-23 coach Radhi Shenaishil selected him to be a part of his 25-man squad to play in 2023 Doha Cup U-23. He was also named in the 2023 WAFF U-23 Championship, which Iraq won for the first time in its history. He was also selected in the 2024 AFC U-23 Asian Cup qualification squad.

== Honours ==
Al-Hudood

- Iraqi Premier Division League: 2021–22

Al-Jolan

- Iraqi Premier Division League: 2025–26

Iraq U-23

- WAFF U-23 Championship: 2023
