= Sumar Almadjed =

Swedish-Iraqi footballer (born 1996)

Personal information
- Full name: Sumar Abdulrazzak Almadjed
- Date of birth: 13 March 1996 (age 30)
- Place of birth: Helsingborg, Sweden
- Height: 1.83 m (6 ft 0 in)
- Position: Defensive midfielder

Team information
- Current team: Al-Minaa
- Number: 8

Youth career
- Eskilsminne IF

Senior career*
| Years | Team | Apps | (Gls) |
| 2015–2016 | Högaborgs BK | 34 | (1) |
| 2017 | Höganäs BK | 21 | (2) |
| 2018 | Hittarps IK | 24 | (2) |
| 2018–2021 | Landskrona BoIS | 65 | (2) |
| 2021–2024 | Helsingborgs IF | 17 | (0) |
| 2024–2025 | Al-Minaa | 13 | (1) |
- * Club domestic league appearances and goals as of 1 February 2025

Sumar Abdulrazzak Almadjed (Arabic: سومر الماجد; born 13 March 1996) is a professional footballer who plays for Iraq Stars League club Al-Minaa. Born in Sweden, he represents Iraq internationally.

== Club career ==
On 17 December 2018, Sumar Almadjed moved to Superettan side Landskrona BoIS. After starring with his team, he earned a move to newly promoted Allsvenskan side Helsingborgs IF in December 2021 ahead of the 2022 Allsvenskan season. In February 2022, Sumar picked up an injury that ruled him out until the very last day of the season, where he came on against Hammarby IF in the second half. On 17 July 2024, his contract with the club was terminated by mutual consent. On 28 August 2024, he signed a contract with Al-Minaa to play in the Iraq Stars League.

== International career ==
Born in Sweden to parents from Nasiriya, Iraq, both Sumar and his father, Abdulrazzak Almadjed, have confirmed that Sumar is available for selection for Iraq. However, both injuries and managers not selecting him have prevented him from joining up with the squad and making his international debut, the last time being called up by Željko Petrović in February 2022 for the initial squad of the 2022 AFC World Cup qualification games in February, but got injured before international duty and therefore missed the season for Helsingborgs IF as well as the matches for Iraq.
