= Bayar Abubakir =

Iraqi footballer

Bayar Abubakir Othman
Personal information
- Date of birth: 31 May 1990 (age 36)
- Place of birth: Duhok, Iraq
- Height: 1.84 m (6 ft 0 in)
- Position: Defender

Team information
- Current team: Duhok SC
- Number: 27

Senior career*
Years	Team	Apps	(Gls)
2013–2017	Duhok		
2017–2023	Al-Naft		
2023-	Duhok		

International career^{‡}
2016	Iraq	1	(1)
- * Club domestic league appearances and goals as of 30 August 2017 ‡ National team caps and goals as of 30 August 2017

Bayar Abubakir (born 31 May 1990) is an Iraqi Kurdish footballer who plays as a defender for Duhok.

== International career ==
On 24 July 2016, Bayar Abubakir made his first international cap with Iraq against Uzbekistan in a friendly match. He scored the only goal for Iraq in a 2-1 defeat.

== International goals ==
Scores and results list Iraq's goal tally first.

#	Date	Venue	Opponent	Score	Result	Competition
1.	24 July 2016	Bunyodkor Stadium, Tashkent	Uzbekistan	1–2	1-2	International Friendly

== Honours ==
Duhok

- Iraq FA Cup: 2024–25
- AGCFF Gulf Club Champions League: 2024–25
