= Raúl Parra =

Spanish footballer (born 1999)

Personal information
- Full name: Raúl Parra Artal
- Date of birth: 26 November 1999 (age 26)
- Place of birth: Zaragoza, Spain
- Height: 1.87 m (6 ft 2 in)
- Position: Right back

Team information
- Current team: Johor Darul Ta'zim
- Number: 36

Youth career
- El Olival

Senior career*
Years	Team	Apps	(Gls)
2018–2019	La Almunia	22	(6)
2019–2020	Mallorca B	36	(1)
2020–2021	Guijuelo	20	(0)
2021–2022	Cádiz B	27	(2)
2021–2023	Cádiz	8	(0)
2022	→ Mirandés (loan)	19	(0)
2023–2025	Estoril	13	(1)
2024	→ Al-Minaa (loan)	8	(0)
2025	→ Eldense (loan)	12	(0)
2025–	Johor Darul Ta'zim	1	(0)
- * Club domestic league appearances and goals as of 14 September 2025

Raúl Parra Artal (born 26 November 1999) is a Spanish professional footballer who plays as a right back for Malaysia Super League club Johor Darul Ta'zim.

== Club career ==
Parra was born in Zaragoza, Aragon, and finished his formation with EM El Olivar. On 28 June 2018, he moved to Tercera División side CD La Almunia.

Parra made his senior debut on 26 August 2018, starting and scoring the equalizer in a 1–1 home draw against CD Belchite 97. After being a regular starter and scoring six goals for the side, he moved to RCD Mallorca on 31 January of the following year, being initially assigned to the reserves also in the fourth division.

On 31 August 2020, Parra signed a one-year contract with Segunda División B side CD Guijuelo. On 23 June of the following year, he agreed to a deal with Cádiz CF and was assigned to the B-side in the Segunda División RFEF.

Parra made his first-team debut on 16 December 2021, starting in a 1–0 away win against Albacete Balompié in the season's Copa del Rey. His professional debut occurred the following 6 January, as he played the full 90 minutes in an away success over CF Fuenlabrada for the same scoreline, also in the national cup.

Parra made his La Liga debut on 18 January 2022, playing the last 12 minutes in a 2–2 home draw against RCD Espanyol. On 4 August, he was loaned to Segunda División side CD Mirandés for the season.

On 26 December 2022, Parra's loan was cut short, and he was definitely assigned to Cádiz's main squad. The following 7 August, he moved abroad and was transferred to Portuguese Primeira Liga side GD Estoril Praia.

On 26 August 2024, Parra agreed to a two-year loan deal with the Iraqi club Al-Minaa SC. On 16 December, however, he returned to Spain and its second division after joining CD Eldense also in a temporary deal.

On 1 September 2025, Parra signed a contract with Malaysia Super League side Johor Darul Ta'zim.

== Personal life ==
Parra's older brother Álvaro is also a footballer. A central defender, he notably represented Deportivo Aragón and AE Prat.
