= Nartey Polo =

Ghanaian footballer (born 1995)

Personal information
- Full name: Nartey Polo Amanor
- Date of birth: 10 April 1995 (age 31)
- Place of birth: Greater Accra, Ghana
- Height: 1.83 m (6 ft 0 in)
- Position: Defender

Team information
- Current team: Al-Bahri SC

Senior career*
Years	Team	Apps	(Gls)
2011–2014	New Edubiase United	36	(3)
2014–2018	Rail Club du Kadiogo	23	(3)
2018–2020	AS Otôho	12	(0)
2020-2021	Salitas FC	10	(0)
2021–2025	Al-Kahrabaa SC		
2025–	Al-Bahri SC		
- * Club domestic league appearances and goals

Nartey Polo Amanor (born 10 April 1995) is a Ghanaian footballer who plays as a defender for Iraqi club Al-Bahri SC.

== Career ==
Polo Amanor began his football career in Ghana in 2009, playing for lower tie club Prampram Mighty Royals and in 2010 for Lazio FC. Following his performance, he joined New Edubiase United between 2011 and 2014.

Polo joined Rail Club du Kadiogo in 2014.

In January 2018, Polo joined AS Otôho for a one-year deal.

== Honours ==
New Edubiase

- Ghanaian FA Cup: 2012

Rail Club du Kadiogo

- Burkinabé Premier League: 2016–2017, 2017–2018
- Burkinabé SuperCup: 2017

AS Otôho

- Congo Premier League: 2018
