= Lolo Plá =

Spanish footballer (born 1993)

Personal information
- Full name: Manuel Coronado Plá
- Date of birth: 7 April 1993 (age 33)
- Place of birth: Mérida, Spain
- Height: 1.80 m (5 ft 11 in)
- Position: Forward

Youth career
- Valladolid

Senior career*
Years	Team	Apps	(Gls)
2011–2013	Valladolid B	63	(17)
2012–2013	Valladolid	7	(0)
2013–2016	Benfica B	35	(10)
2014–2015	→ Lugo (loan)	23	(3)
2015–2016	→ Cádiz (loan)	37	(9)
2016–2017	Necaxa	0	(0)
2016–2017	→ Toledo (loan)	26	(14)
2017–2019	Elche	20	(2)
2018	→ Recreativo (loan)	9	(0)
2019	→ Valencia B (loan)	13	(5)
2019–2020	Gimnàstic	15	(0)
2020–2021	Guijuelo	12	(5)
2021–2023	Mérida	65	(12)
2023–2024	Cacereño	15	(3)
2024	Talavera	15	(6)
2024–2025	Al-Minaa	19	(4)
2026	Teruel	19	(2)
2026	Eastern	1	(1)
- * Club domestic league appearances and goals as of 16:34, 29 September 2026 (UTC)

Manuel "Lolo" Coronado Plá (born 7 April 1993) is a Spanish professional footballer who plays as a forward.

Having spent his early career at Valladolid in La Liga, Lugo in the Segunda División and Benfica B in the Portuguese Segunda Liga, he played most of it in the lower leagues of his country. He made 157 appearances and scored 36 goals in the Spanish third tier, in service of eight clubs.

== Club career ==
=== Valladolid ===
Born in Mérida, Extremadura, Plá began his career with Real Valladolid's youth sides, and made his senior debut in 2010–11 for the B team in the Tercera División. On 20 August 2012, he appeared in his first official game with the main squad, playing the last four minutes in a 1–0 La Liga away win over Real Zaragoza, the first matchday of the season.

=== Benfica ===
Plá signed for S.L. Benfica in Portugal on 2 August 2013 in spite of being threatened by his former club, which later led to compensation as his link was not severed by mutual consent. He was assigned to the reserves and played his first match for them on the 26th, coming from the bench in the 81st minute of the Segunda Liga home fixture against Portimonense S.C. and scoring the final goal in a 3–0 victory.

On 30 August 2014, Plá was loaned to Segunda División's CD Lugo on a season-long deal. The following summer, he joined Segunda División B side Cádiz CF also on loan.

=== Elche ===
In the 2016 off-season, Plá was acquired by Mexican club Club Necaxa, but was immediately loaned back to CD Toledo of the Spanish third tier. He helped them to finish second in their group, and then signed for Elche CF of the same league in July 2017.

Plá contributed two goals in Elche's promotion campaign (five in all competitions), but spent the following season on loan at Recreativo de Huelva and Valencia CF Mestalla.

=== Later career ===
On 14 July 2019, Plá agreed to a two-year deal with Gimnàstic de Tarragona. He was unregistered from the main squad the following transfer window due to poor performances, and terminated his contract in March 2020.

In September 2020, Plá joined CD Guijuelo. His only season was marred by injury and resulted in a double relegation to the new Tercera Federación following a league restructuring.

Plá signed for his hometown side Mérida AD in the league above in June 2021. Including the Copa Federación, he scored 12 times in 34 total games as his first campaign at the Estadio Romano ended in promotion via the playoffs; his link was then extended for a second year.

Plá continued to compete in the lower leagues subsequently, with CP Cacereño and CF Talavera de la Reina. He moved abroad again on 12 August 2024, on a contract at Iraq Stars League club Al-Minaa SC.

On 9 January 2026, Plá returned to Spain, joining Primera Federación club CD Teruel. In August, he agreed to a deal at Hong Kong Premier League's Eastern SC.
