= Tuisila Kisinda =

Footballer (born 1999)

Personal information
- Full name: Tuisila Rossien Kisinda
- Date of birth: 20 December 1999 (age 26)
- Place of birth: DR Congo
- Height: 1.74 m (5 ft 9 in)
- Position: Right winger

Team information
- Current team: Al-Quwa Al-Jawiya

Senior career*
Years	Team	Apps	(Gls)
2017–2019	AS Maniema Union	6	(0)
2019–2020	AS Vita Club	12	(1)
2020–2021	Young Africans	4	(0)
2021–2024	RS Berkane	53	(1)
2022–2023	→ Young Africans (loan)	14	(1)
2024–2026	Al-Minaa	37	(2)
2026–	Al-Quwa Al-Jawiya	5	(0)

International career
2019	DR Congo U20	5	(1)
- * Club domestic league appearances and goals as of 14 September 2025

Tuisila Kisinda (born 20 December 1999) is a Congolese professional footballer who plays as a right winger for Iraq Stars League club Al-Quwa Al-Jawiya.

== Club career ==
In August 2020, Tanzanian club Young Africans signed Kisinda from AS Vita Club.

In August 2021, Kisinda moved from Young Africans and signed a three-year contract with Moroccan club RS Berkane, for a reported $300,000 fee. In August 2022, RS Berkane loaned Kisinda to his former team Young Africans to reduce the number of foreign players in the team, as they exceeded the limit set by the Moroccan Federation's laws. In August 2023, the player's loan ended and he returned to his club, which decided to keep him to build a strong team to play in local and continental tournaments. When the player's contract ended in 2024, the Moroccan club wanted to renew his contract, but he refused and wanted to have a new experience.

In August 2024, the player moved to the Iraq Stars League and signed a contract with Al-Minaa. On 22 April 2025, he scored his first goal for Al-Minaa, the winning goal in the Basra derby against Naft Al-Basra, in a match that ended with a score of 1–0. On 26 May 2025, the player's contract was renewed for an additional year, with the club's management announcing its desire to retain his services for as long as possible.

== Honours ==
RS Berkane

- Moroccan Throne Cup: 2022
- CAF Confederation Cup: 2022

Young Africans

- Tanzanian Premier League: 2022–23
