= André Alsanati =

Swedish-Iraqi footballer

Personal information
- Full name: André Alan Alsanati
- Date of birth: 6 January 2000 (age 26)
- Place of birth: Sweden
- Height: 1.65 m (5 ft 5 in)
- Position: Winger

Team information
- Current team: Al
- Number: 20

Youth career
- Al-Mosul SC: Triangelns IK
- –2014: IFK Eskilstuna
- 2016–2018: Hammarby IF

Senior career*
Years	Team	Apps	(Gls)
2014	IFK Eskilstuna	3	(1)
2015–2016	Eskilstuna City FK	22	(3)
2019–2020	Hammarby IF	0	(0)
2019–2020	→ IK Frej Täby (loan)	26	(0)
2021–2022	AFC Eskilstuna	55	(9)
2023–	IK Sirius	26	(3)
2024	→ AC Oulu (loan)	6	(0)
2024–2025	→ Al-Minaa (loan)	21	(2)

International career^{‡}
2015–2016	Sweden U17	7	(1)
2023–	Iraq	1	(0)
- * Club domestic league appearances and goals as of 25 June 2025 ‡ National team caps and goals as of 15:16, 1 September 2023 (UTC)

André Alan Alsanati (Arabic: اندريه السناطي; born 6 January 2000) is a professional footballer who plays as a winger for Iraq Stars League club Al-Minaa. Born in Sweden as an Assyrian, he represents Iraq internationally.

== Early life ==
Alsanati was born and raised in Sweden to Iraqi Assyrian parents.

As a youth player, Alsanati received interest from clubs in England and the Netherlands but he never signed for any of the clubs.

== Club career ==
André was playing football with Eskilstuna-based clubs IFK Eskilstuna and Eskistuna City before Hammarby IF signed him in 2016. He moved on two separate but consecutive one year-loan stints at IK Frej Täby. During his last season with IK Frej, he made thirteen appearances and recorded one assist.

After that, he moved on a free to AFC Eskilstuna in January 2021 in the Superettan. During the 2021 season, he made twenty-seven appearances for AFC Eskilstuna. He played for AFC Eskilstuna during the 2022 season as well. His performances there attracted interest from Allsvenskan teams, including Elfsborg, but the transfer never materialized.

On 14 November 2022, IK Sirius signed Alsanati on a 5-year contract. He was seen as a replacement for Moustafa Zeidan. He was tested in a different position upon arrival. He scored on his debut against Norrkoping.

On 11 July 2024, he was loaned out to Veikkausliiga club AC Oulu for the rest of the season with a purchase option.

On 30 August 2024, he signed a contract with Al-Minaa to play in the Iraq Stars League. His contract expired on 30 June 2025 and was not renewed with the club.

== International career ==
Alsanati debuted for Sweden men's national under-17 football team at the age of fifteen and made seven appearances and scored one goal in total for them.

André was first invited to a training camp in Antalya in January 2022 for the Iraq U-23 side. He has since began procedures to obtain an Iraqi passport and represent Iraq internationally. When in Baghdad to complete his paperwork in March 2023, the national team were conducting a training camp in Baghdad so manager Jesús Casas invited the player to train with the squad. On 20 May 2023, it was announced that FIFA completed the transferral of the player's paperwork to make him officially eligible to represent the Lions of Mesopotamia, and was called up to the training camp in Spain to play against Colombia in June 2023.

== Style of play ==
Coach Mats Jingblad compared Alsanti to Lionel Messi due to his dribbling ability.
