= Osama Anbar =

Yemeni footballer

Personal information
- Full name: Osama Ahmed Hezam Anbar
- Date of birth: 20 January 1995 (age 31)
- Place of birth: Yemen
- Position: Midfielder

Team information
- Current team: Al-Minaa
- Number: 15

Senior career*
Years	Team	Apps	(Gls)
–2015	Al-Ittihad		
2015–2020	Al-Yarmuk Al-Rawda		
2020–2021	Club Eagles		
2021–2023	Al-Yarmuk Al-Rawda		
2023–2024	Malkiya		
2024–2025	Al-Kahrabaa		
2025	Al-Minaa	11	(0)
2026	Al-Najaf	3	(0)
2026–	Ahli Sana'a		

International career
2015–	Yemen	15	(0)
- * Club domestic league appearances and goals as of 21 June 2026

Osama Ahmed Hezam Anbar (Arabic: أُسَامَة أَحْمَد حَزَّام عَنْبَر; born 20 January 1995) is a Yemeni footballer who is plays as a midfielder for Yemeni League club Ahli Sana'a.

== Career ==
In 2020, Anbar signed for Maldivian side Club Eagles but left due to refusing to take the Indian Covaxin COVID-19 vaccine.
