= Hamid Abdulla =

Swedish footballer

Personal information
- Full name: Hamid Rashid Abdulla Al-Taie
- Date of birth: 1 April 2001 (age 25)
- Place of birth: Malmö, Sweden
- Positions: Left winger; second striker

Team information
- Current team: Al-Minaa
- Number: 19

Youth career
- –2016: BK Olympic
- 2017–2018: Malmö FF

Senior career*
Years	Team	Apps	(Gls)
2018–2020	BK Olympic	17	(0)
2020–2021	FBK Balkan	31	(0)
2022	BK Olympic	7	(0)
2022	IFK Malmö	14	(2)
2023–2024	Rosengård	30	(5)
2024–2025	Al-Minaa	35	(2)
2025–2026	Al-Talaba	7	(0)
2026–	BK Olympic	3	(0)
- * Club domestic league appearances and goals as of 25 June 2025

Hamid Rashid Abdulla Al-Taie (born 1 April 2001) is a Swedish footballer who plays as a left winger for Iraq Stars League club Al-Minaa.

== Club career ==
Abdulla started playing senior football with BK Olympic in 2018, then moved to FBK Balkan for two seasons, and in February 2022 he returned again to sign a contract with BK Olympic. In July 2022, he moved to IFK Malmö, signing a contract with the club he previously played for as a youth. In December 2022, Abdulla signed a contract with Rosengård and moved to play for them.

On August 5, 2024, Al-Minaa, active in the Iraq Stars League, announced the signing with Abdulla. On December 15, 2024, Abdulla scored his first goal for Al-Minaa against Diyala in the FA Cup, in a match that his team won 3–2. On May 3, 2025, he scored his first goal in the Iraq Stars League, which was the winning goal against Al-Karma in a match that ended with a score of 1–0.
