= Abed Saleem =

Iraqi footballer (born 1995)

Personal information
- Full name: Abed Saleem Hammad
- Date of birth: 14 October 1995 (age 31)
- Place of birth: Ramadi, Al-Anbar, Iraq
- Height: 1.80 m (5 ft 11 in)
- Position: Goalkeeper

Team information
- Current team: Al-Minaa
- Number: 1

Senior career*
Years	Team	Apps	(Gls)
–2019	Al-Ramadi		
2019–2023	Al-Karkh		
2023–	Al-Minaa	39	(0)
2024	→ Amanat Baghdad (loan)	19	(0)
- * Club domestic league appearances and goals as of 5 October 2025

Abed Saleem Hammad (born 14 October 1995) is an Iraqi professional footballer who plays as a goalkeeper for Iraqi Stars League side Al-Minaa.

== Club career ==
Saleem began his career with Al-Ramadi, and on 16 August 2019, he moved to Al-Karkh, where he performed exceptionally well and contributed to the Iraq FA Cup for the first time in the club's history win in the 2021–22 season. He also performed well the following year in the same tournament, saving three penalty kicks in the quarter-finals against Al-Talaba in a match that his team won on penalties and helping them qualify for the semi-finals.

On 12 August 2023, he moved to play with Al-Minaa and signed a two-season contract. However, he was unable to play with the team, due to Al-Minaa's ban by FIFA from contracting players, Saleem moved on loan to Amanat Baghdad in the winter transfer period. On 13 August 2024, after the ban period ended, Al-Minaa announced the goalkeeper's return from loan, and his contract was renewed for an additional season. He performed well with the team, and in the 14th round he was the fifth best goalkeeper in the league, having obtained 6 clean sheets and conceded only 10 goals. This prompted the club to renew his contract for an additional season on 20 August 2025. On 5 October 2025, he saved a penalty kick in an away match against Al-Quwa Al-Jawiya, taken by Saad Abdul-Amir.

In the first round of the 2026–27 season, Al-Minaa faced the host Al-Zawraa, and Saleem shone, managing to save more than one ball and preventing Al-Zawraa’s strikers from scoring against him. The match ended in a goalless draw, and Saleem was chosen as one of the best lineups of the round.

== Honours ==
Al-Karkh

- Iraq FA Cup: 2021–22
