= Abdallah Amri =

Tunisian footballer

Personal information
- Date of birth: 6 September 2001 (age 25)
- Place of birth: Sfax, Tunisia
- Position: Midfielder

Team information
- Current team: US Ben Guerdane
- Number: 27

Senior career*
Years	Team	Apps	(Gls)
2020–2024	CS Sfaxien	57	(1)
2024–2025	Al-Minaa SC	7	(0)
2025–	US Ben Guerdane	3	(0)

International career^{‡}
2021–2022	Tunisia U20	6	(0)
2022–	Tunisia Olympic	2	(0)
- * Club domestic league appearances and goals as of 17 September 2025 ‡ National team caps and goals as of 30 October 2022

Abdallah Amri (Arabic: عَبْد الله الْعُمَرِيّ; born 6 September 2001) is a professional Tunisian footballer.

== Club career ==
Amri was born in Sfax, and started playing for Jeunesse Sportive De Thyna. He caught the attention of talent scouts at CS Sfaxien at an early age, and they offered him a five-year professional contract. He participated in his team's victory in the Tunisian Cup in 2022, where he was able to score the second winning goal in the final. In June 2024, the player's contract with CS Sfaxien was terminated after four seasons with the Tunisian team.

On August 4, 2024, Amri signed a contract with Al-Minaa, active in the Iraq Stars League, for one season, with the option to purchase or renew.

== International career ==
Amri was first picked to represent Tunisia in 2020, when the under-20 coach Maher Kanzari selected Amri to be a part of his 23-man squad to play in 2021 U-20 Africa Cup of Nations qualification.

He was also selected by the same coach to be part of the 21-man Olympic squad to play in the 2023 U-23 Africa Cup of Nations qualifiers for the 2024 Summer Olympics in Paris.

== Honours ==
CS Sfaxien

- Tunisian Ligue Professionnelle 1 runners-up: 2019–20
- Tunisian Cup: 2020–21, 2021–22
