= Gerald Takwara =

Zimbabwean footballer (born 1994)

Personal information
- Full name: John Gerald Tungamirai Takwara
- Date of birth: 29 October 1994 (age 32)
- Place of birth: Harare, Zimbabwe
- Height: 1.77 m (5 ft 10 in)
- Position: Centre back

Team information
- Current team: Al-Minaa
- Number: 31

Senior career*
Years	Team	Apps	(Gls)
2015	Tsholotsho Pirates		
2015–2017	F.C. Platinum		
2017–2019	Ajax Cape Town	23	(0)
2019–2021	Ngezi Platinum		
2021–2022	Venda	27	(1)
2022–2024	Ohod	38	(4)
2024–2025	Al-Minaa	30	(1)

International career^{‡}
2015–	Zimbabwe	20	(0)
- * Club domestic league appearances and goals as of 25 June 2025 ‡ National team caps and goals as of 10 September 2024

John Gerald Tungamirai Takwara (born 29 October 1994) is a Zimbabwean professional footballer who plays as a centre back for Iraq Stars League club Al-Minaa and the Zimbabwe national team.

== Club career ==
Takwara began his career in his native Zimbabwe with Tsholotsho Pirates and F.C. Platinum, before moving to South Africa with Ajax Cape Town. He returned to Zimbabwe with Ngezi Platinum, before joining Venda in South Africa on 22 July 2021.

On 19 July 2022, Takwara joined the Saudi Arabian club Ohod.

On 13 August 2024, Takwara signed a contract with Iraq Stars League club Al-Minaa. His contract expired on 30 June 2025 and was not renewed with the club.

== International career ==
Takwara made his international debut with the Zimbabwe national team in a 0–0 2016 African Nations Championship tie with Comoros on 4 July 2015. He was part of the Zimbabwe squad the 2021 Africa Cup of Nations.

On 11 December 2025, Takwara was called up to the Zimbabwe squad for the 2025 Africa Cup of Nations.

== Honours ==
F.C. Platinum

- Zimbabwe Premier Soccer League: 2017
