= Clench Loufilou =

Gabonese footballer

Personal information
- Full name: Clench Ruben Loufilou Ndella
- Date of birth: 12 April 1999 (age 27)
- Height: 1.83 m (6 ft 0 in)
- Position: Midfielder

Team information
- Current team: Al-Minaa
- Number: 79

Senior career*
Years	Team	Apps	(Gls)
2016–2019	Mangasport		
2019–2020	Ajaccio B	7	(0)
2019–2020	Ajaccio	1	(0)
2021	Mangasport		
2022–2024	Sur		
2024–2026	Al-Minaa	42	(0)

International career^{‡}
2018–	Gabon	16	(0)
- * Club domestic league appearances and goals as of 22 November 2025 ‡ National team caps and goals as of 31 December 2025

Clench Ruben Loufilou Ndella (born 12 April 1999) is a Gabonese international footballer who plays as a defensive midfielder for Iraq Stars League club Al-Minaa and the Gabon national team.

== Club career ==
He began his career with Mangasport. After spending time on trial with French club Ajaccio throughout August 2019, he signed a one-year contract with the club on 2 September 2019. After leaving Ajaccio, in 2021 he returned to Mangasport. On 2 September 2022 he signed for Omani club Sur, and on 31 July 2023, the club renewed the player's contract for an additional season.

On 5 August 2024, he signed with Al-Minaa of the Iraq Stars League. On 13 June 2026, the player was released by the management of Al-Minaa Club.

== International career ==
He made his international debut for Gabon in 2018.

== Career statistics ==
=== International ===
As of matches played on 31 December 2025

Appearances and goals by national team and year
National team	Year	Apps	Goals
Gabon	2018	4	0
Gabon	2019	1	0
Gabon	2020	0	0
Gabon	2021	0	0
Gabon	2022	0	0
Gabon	2023	2	0
Gabon	2024	5	0
Gabon	2025	4	0
Total		16	0
