= Hussein Amer =

Iraqi footballer

Personal information
- Full name: Hussein Amer Ojaimi Al-Rikabi
- Date of birth: 28 April 2002 (age 24)
- Place of birth: Muthanna, Iraq
- Height: 1.82 m (6 ft 0 in)
- Position: Centre back

Team information
- Current team: Al-Minaa
- Number: 5

Youth career
- –2021: Al-Khidhir

Senior career*
Years	Team	Apps	(Gls)
2021–2022	Al-Khidhir		
2022–2023	Al-Sinaat Al-Kahrabaiya		
2023–2025	Al-Minaa	18	(0)
2023–2024	→Naft Maysan (loan)	26	(1)
2025–	Al-Talaba	0	(0)

International career^{‡}
2023–	Iraq U23	15	(0)
- * Club domestic league appearances and goals as of 2 July 2025 ‡ National team caps and goals as of 12 August 2024

Hussein Amer Ojaimi Al-Rikabi (born 28 April 2002) is an Iraqi professional footballer who plays as a centre back for Iraqi Stars League side Al-Talaba.

== Club career ==
Amer started playing in the club of his city, Al-Khidhir, then moved to Al-Sinaat Al-Kahrabaiya in the Iraqi First Division League in 2022.

On 21 August 2023, he moved to play with Al-Minaa and signed a two-season contract. However, due to Al-Minaa's ban by FIFA from contracting players, Amer moved on loan to Naft Maysan, and on 8 May 2024, he was excluded from the team, but returned later, and on 1 June 2024, he managed to score his first goal in the Iraqi Stars League for Naft Maysan against Al-Shorta. On 12 August 2024, after returning from the loan, he renewed his contract with Al-Minaa.

== International career ==
Amer was part of the Iraq national under-23 football team squad that won the 2023 WAFF U-23 Championship. Amer gave a brilliant performance in the tournament and was considered one of the factors of the team's success.

He was also selected by the coach Radhi Shenaishil to be part of the 22-man Olympic squad to play in the 2024 Summer Olympics in Paris. Amer presented a wonderful level in the Olympics, which was praised by most sports analysts.

== Honours ==
Iraq U23

- WAFF U-23 Championship: 2023
