= Siyaband Ageed =

Iraqi footballer (born 2006)

Personal information
- Full name: Siyaband Ageed Siyaband
- Date of birth: 3 July 2001 (age 25)
- Place of birth: Duhok, Iraq
- Height: 1.86 m (6 ft 1 in)
- Position: Right-back

Team information
- Current team: Duhok
- Number: 99

Youth career
- –2023: Duhok
- 2019–2020: → Zakho (loan)

Senior career*
| Years | Team | Apps | (Gls) |
| 2023– | Duhok | 81 | (3) |

International career
| 2023 | Iraq U23 | 1 | (0) |
- * Club domestic league appearances and goals

Siyaband Ageed Siyaband (Arabic: سيابند عكيد; born 3 July 2001) is an Iraqi professional footballer who plays as a right-back for Iraq Stars League club Duhok and the Iraq national team.

== Club career ==
Ageed began his youth career with Duhok's under-18 team. In July 2019, he moved to Zakho's under-19 team.

During the 2024–25 season, Ageed featured for Duhok in domestic competitions and the Gulf Club Champions League.

== International career ==
At the international level, Ageed played with the Iraq national under-23 team. He was called up to the Iraq national team in November 2026, for the 2026 Basra Tournament.
