= Pablo Grandes =

Spanish football manager

Personal information
- Full name: Pablo María Grandes Melgarejo
- Date of birth: 14 October 1986 (age 40)
- Place of birth: Puerto de Santa María, Spain

Team information
- Current team: Najran (manager)

Youth career
- Xerez

Senior career*
Years	Team	Apps	(Gls)
2007–2008	Torredonjimeno		

Managerial career
- 2016–2017: Xerez Deportivo (youth)
- 2017–2021: Cádiz (youth)
- 2021–2022: UD Logroñés (assistant)
- 2022: Vélez (assistant)
- 2022: San Fernando (assistant)
- 2022–2024: Iraq (match analyst)
- 2024: Iraq Olympic (assistant)
- 2024–2025: Al-Minaa
- 2025–2026: Najran
- * Club domestic league appearances and goals

Pablo Grandes Melgarejo (born 14 October 1986) is a Spanish football coach and current manager of Saudi Second Division League club Najran.

== Early years ==
Grandes began playing football in the lower categories of his hometown Puerto de Santa María, then in the youth team of Xerez. In Andalusia he played for Torredonjimeno in the Tercera División and had a small experience in a team in the Scottish Second Division in 2010. He returned to play in the Andalusian teams and at the same time obtained his coaching license by working as a player trainer in Puerto de Santa María.

== Managerial and coaching career ==
=== Early career ===
Grandes began his coaching career in the youth team of Cádiz, then he was the assistant manager at UD Logroñés, Vélez, and San Fernando. He has always worked as a coach except for the Cádiz youth academy where he did everything: technical training, scouting, analysis.

=== Iraq & Iraq Olympic ===
On November 5, 2022, Jesús Casas was appointed coach of the Iraq national team by the IFA. Casas chose Grandes to be part of his assistant staff as a match analyst, and he was able to lead the Iraq to win the Arabian Gulf Cup for the first time in 35 years, as they had previously worked together at Cádiz youth, when Casas was the coach and Grandes his assistant.

On May 27, 2024, the coach of the Iraq Olympic, Radhi Shenaishil, chose Grandes to join his assistant staff in the 2024 Summer Olympics in Paris, while continuing to work with the national team staff as well.

=== Al-Minaa ===
On July 29, 2024, the management of Al-Minaa, which is active in the Iraq Stars League, announced that it had contracted with Grandes to lead its team in the league. On February 8, 2025, the club's management dismissed him after the negative results that Al-Minaa team had achieved in the last rounds and its delay in the Iraq Stars League teams' ranking until it reached an area close to the relegation zone.

=== Najran ===
On 13 August 2025, Grandes was appointed as manager of Saudi Second Division League club Najran.

== Managerial statistics ==
As of match played 10 April 2026

Team	Nat	From	To	Record				
Team	Nat	From	To	G	W	D	L	Win %
Al-Minaa	(Iraq)	29 July 2024	8 February 2025	21	7	5	9	33.33
Najran	(Saudi Arabia)	13 August 2025	29 April 2026	30	13	7	10	43.33
Total				51	20	12	19	39.22
