= Habib Fofana =

Ivorian footballer (born 1998)

Personal information
- Full name: Habib Omar Fofana
- Date of birth: 16 November 1998 (age 27)
- Place of birth: Ivory Coast
- Height: 1.92 m (6 ft 4 in)
- Position: Centre-back

Team information
- Current team: Persikad Depok
- Number: 2

Youth career
- 2020–2022: Entente II

Senior career*
Years	Team	Apps	(Gls)
2022–2023	Dinamo-Auto	10	(0)
2023	Belshina Bobruisk	22	(0)
2024	Al-Minaa	14	(0)
2024–2025	Diyala	10	(0)
2025	Naft Al-Basra	9	(0)
2026	Real Kashmir	10	(0)
2026–	Persikad Depok	4	(0)
- * Club domestic league appearances and goals as of 22:33, 3 October 2026 (UTC)

Habib Omar Fofana (born 16 November 1998) is an Ivorian professional footballer who plays as a defender for Championship club Persikad Depok.

== Career ==
Fofana started playing for the Togolese club Entente II. In July 2022, he moved to Moldovan club Dinamo-Auto, signing a three-year contract with the club. He made his debut for the club on 20 August 2022 in a match against Sfîntul Gheorghe in the Moldovan Super Liga. He recorded his first active action on 10 September 2022 in a match against Dacia Buiucani, where he provided an assist. In October 2022, he began taking to the field with the captain's armband. At the end of the season the club finished last in the standings and was relegated to Moldovan Liga 1.

In March 2023, Fofana moved to Belarusian Belshina Bobruisk. He made his debut for the club on 19 March 2023 in a match against Smorgon in the Belarusian Premier League, entering the match in the starting lineup. He quickly established himself as a regular in the team's starting lineup, becoming a key defender, but did not distinguish himself with any active actions during the season. At the end of the season, the club finished last in the standings, and was relegated to the Belarusian First League.

In March 2024, the Iraqi club Al-Minaa announced the contract with four professionals, but did not mention their names. Their arrival was delayed due to the visa. On 27 April 2024, Fofana arrived in Iraq, and the club announced the completion of contract procedures with him. On 30 April 2024, he participated in the starting lineup in his team's match against Zakho in Iraq Stars League.
