= Al-Kut Olympic Stadium =

Stadium in Iraq

- ملعب الكوت الأولمبي
- Interactive map of Al-Kut Olympic Stadium
- Full name: Al-Kut Olympic Stadium
- Location: Al Kut, Iraq
- Coordinates: 32°30′07″N 45°50′09″E
- Owner: Ministry of Youth and Sports (Iraq)
- Capacity: 20,000
- Surface: Mixto Hybrid Grass
- Scoreboard: Yes
- Field size: 105 by 68 metres (115 by 74 yd)

Construction
- Built: 2013–2018
- Opened: 28 July 2018
- Cost: $30 Million

Tenant
- Al-Kut SC

Al-Kut Olympic Stadium (Arabic: ملعب الكوت الأولمبي) is a multi-purpose stadium in Al Kut, Iraq. It is currently used mostly for football matches and also has facilities for athletics. The stadium has an official capacity of 20,000.

It was officially inaugurated on 28 July 2018 with a football match between Al-Kut SC and Al-Mosul FC.

The stadium hosted the 2019 Iraqi Super Cup on 14 September 2019 between Al-Zawraa SC and Al-Shorta SC. The latter won the competition for the first time in its history by winning on penalties (4–3) after the match ended 1-1.

== History ==
After destruction of the old Al-Kut Stadium, the construction of the new one was launched in 2013 under the leadership of Iraqi Al Karama Company, which is affiliated to the Ministry of Industry and Minerals. Five years later, due to slowdowns and delays in project delivery, it was agreed to assign the contract to the Italian-Swedish company Sport System to finalise construction in 8 months. This allowed the work to be fully completed and the project to be inaugurated in 2018.

== See also ==
- List of football stadiums in Iraq
