= Gustavo Henrique (footballer, born 1995) =

Brazilian footballer

Personal information
- Full name: Gustavo Henrique Rodrigues
- Date of birth: 8 November 1995 (age 31)
- Place of birth: Igarapava, Brazil
- Height: 1.85 m (6 ft 1 in)
- Position: Forward

Team information
- Current team: Arema
- Number: 29

Youth career
- 2012–2014: Ferroviária

Senior career*
| Years | Team | Apps | (Gls) |
| 2012–2014 | Ferroviária | 30 | (7) |
| 2015 | Rio Preto | 13 | (3) |
| 2015 | Noroeste | 20 | (1) |
| 2016 | Fernandópolis | 7 | (0) |
| 2016 | Ferroviária | 12 | (6) |
| 2017 | São Carlos | 17 | (5) |
| 2017 | Noroeste | 1 | (0) |
| 2017 | Guarani de Palhoça | 3 | (1) |
| 2018 | São Carlos | 16 | (5) |
| 2018–2021 | Atibaia | 32 | (10) |
| 2019 | → Boa Esporte (loan) | 30 | (10) |
| 2019 | → Vila Nova (loan) | 18 | (2) |
| 2020 | → Botafogo-SP (loan) | 11 | (0) |
| 2020 | → Mirassol (loan) | 11 | (4) |
| 2021 | → ABC (loan) | 18 | (7) |
| 2022–2023 | Figueirense | 34 | (7) |
| 2022–2023 | → Cong An Hanoi (loan) | 20 | (6) |
| 2023–2025 | Zakho | 35 | (17) |
| 2024 | → América de Natal (loan) | 25 | (7) |
| 2025–2026 | Ninh Binh | 20 | (6) |
| 2026– | Arema | 0 | (0) |
- * Club domestic league appearances and goals as of 31 May 2026

Gustavo Henrique Rodrigues (born 8 November 1995) is a Brazilian professional footballer who plays as a forward for Super League club Arema.

== Career ==
Revealed by Ferroviária, Gustavo Henrique played most of his career in teams in the São Paulo countryside. In the 2019 season, he was loaned by Atibaia to Boa Esporte and Vila Nova, playing his first matches in the Brazilian championship. In 2020 he was part of the Serie D champion squad with Mirassol, and later played for ABC and Figueirense. In 2023 he was Vietnamese champion with Hanoi Police, and was subsequently hired by Zahko SC from Iraq. Loaned to América de Natal in 2024, he was state champion in addition to playing in the 2024 Campeonato Brasileiro Série D.

In June 2025, Gustavo Henrique returned to Vietnam, joining newly promoted V.League 1 side Ninh Binh.

On 17 July 2026, Henrique moved to Indonesia, signed a contract with Super League club Arema.

== Honours ==
Mirassol

- Campeonato Brasileiro Série D: 2020

Hanoi Police

- V.League 1: 2023

América de Natal

- Campeonato Potiguar: 2024

Individual

- Piala Presiden Top Goalscorer: 2026
