= Zakho International Stadium =

Stadium in Zakho; Kurdistan, Iraq

Zakho International Stadium یاریگای نێودەوڵەتیی زاخۆ
- یاریگای زاخۆ
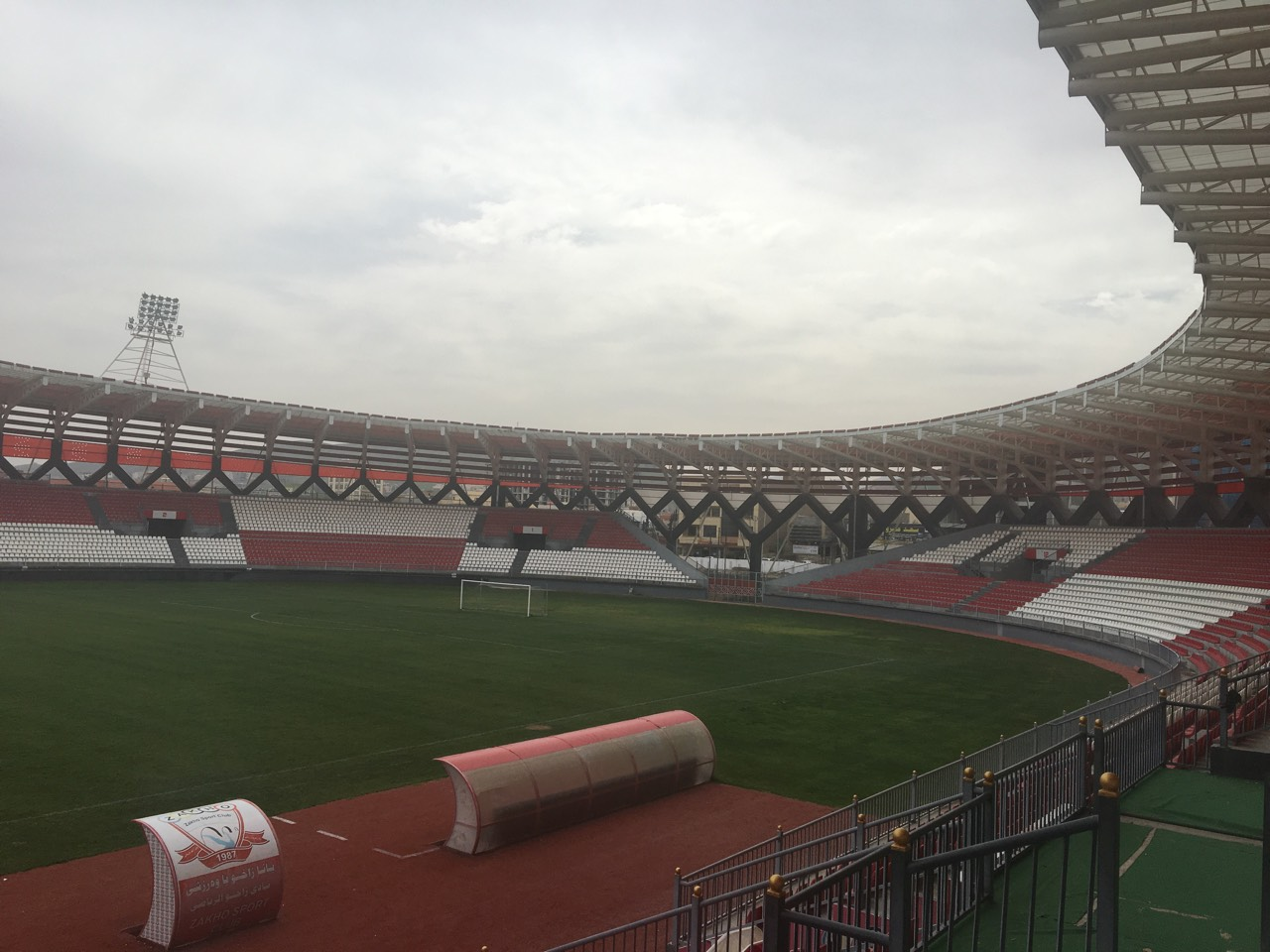
- Interactive map of Zakho International Stadium یاریگای نێودەوڵەتیی زاخۆ
- Full name: Zakho International Stadium
- Location: Zakho, Kurdistan Region, Iraq
- Coordinates: 37°08′46″N 42°40′20″E
- Owner: Zakho SC
- Capacity: 20,000
- Surface: Grass
- Scoreboard: Yes
- Field size: 105 m × 68 m

Construction
- Built: 2012–2015
- Opened: 3 June 2015
- Cost: $20 Million
- Services engineer: Global Sport IQ
- Main contractor: Global Sport IQ

Tenant
- Zakho SC

Zakho International Stadium (Arabic: ملعب زاخو الدولي, Kurdish: یاریگەها نێودەولەتیا زاخۆ) is a multi-purpose stadium in Zakho, Kurdistan Region, Iraq. It is used mostly for football matches and serves as the home stadium of Zakho FC which plays in the Iraqi Premier League. The stadium have 20,000 seating capacity but it can hold more. It has 12 entrance and exit gates. The roof consists of 12,000 m ^{2} of polycarbonate architectural panels shaded in red and white depicting the colors of the local team. Construction took 3 years (from 2012 to 2015) for a total cost of $20 million.

The opening ceremony took place on Wednesday 3 June 2015 between Zakho FC and the Iraq national football team. The match ended in a 2–0 victory for the Iraq national football team, scored by captain Younis Mahmoud and Hussein Ali Wahid.

The inauguration aroused large official and popular attendance, including the presence of the former Minister of Youth and Sport Abdul-Hussein Abtaan, the head of the National Olympic Committee of Iraq Raad Hammoudi and the former Iraqi national team player, Hussein Saeed.

== Gallery ==
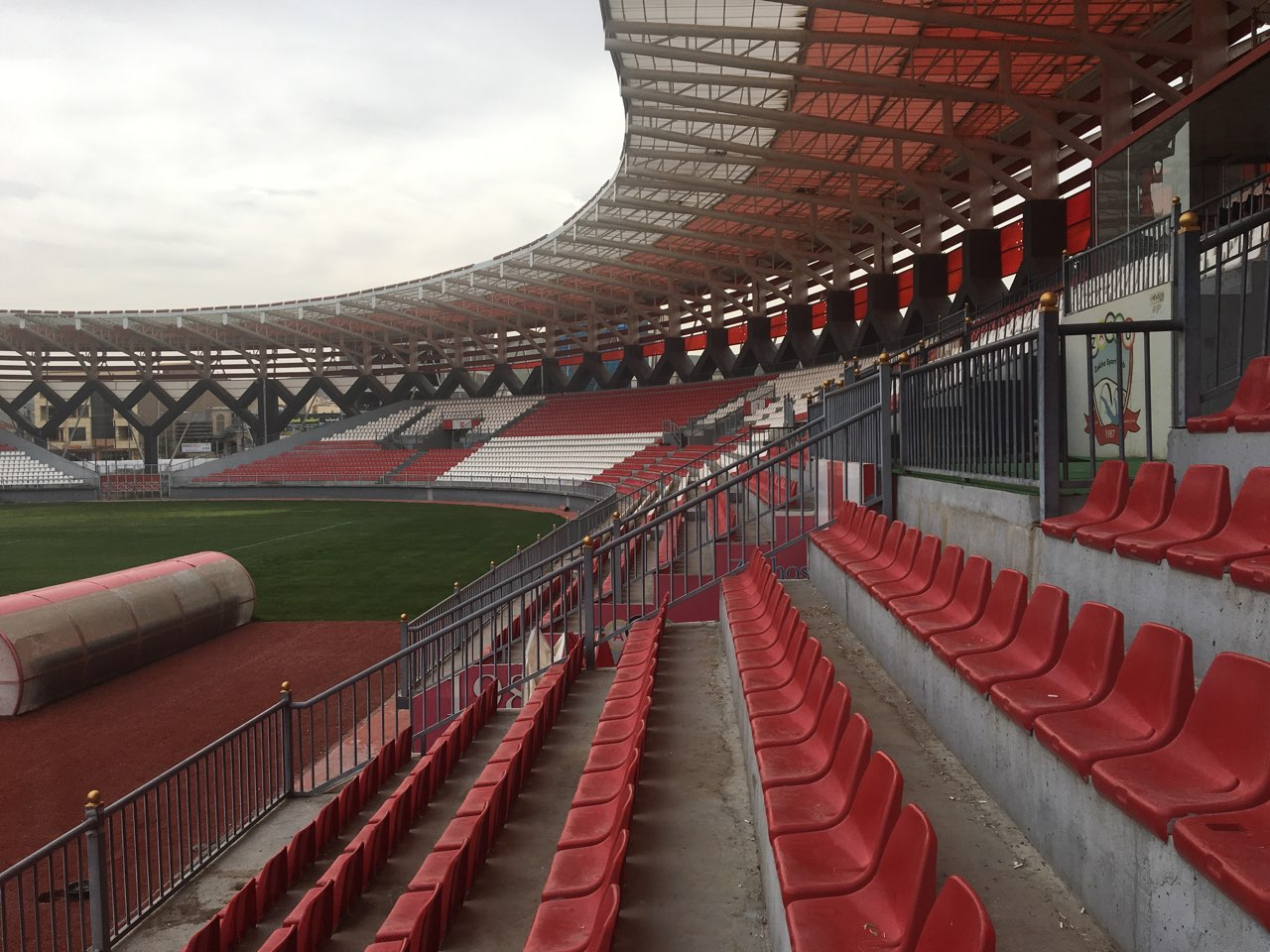
The stands of the stadium are tinted in red and white, displaying the colors of the club.

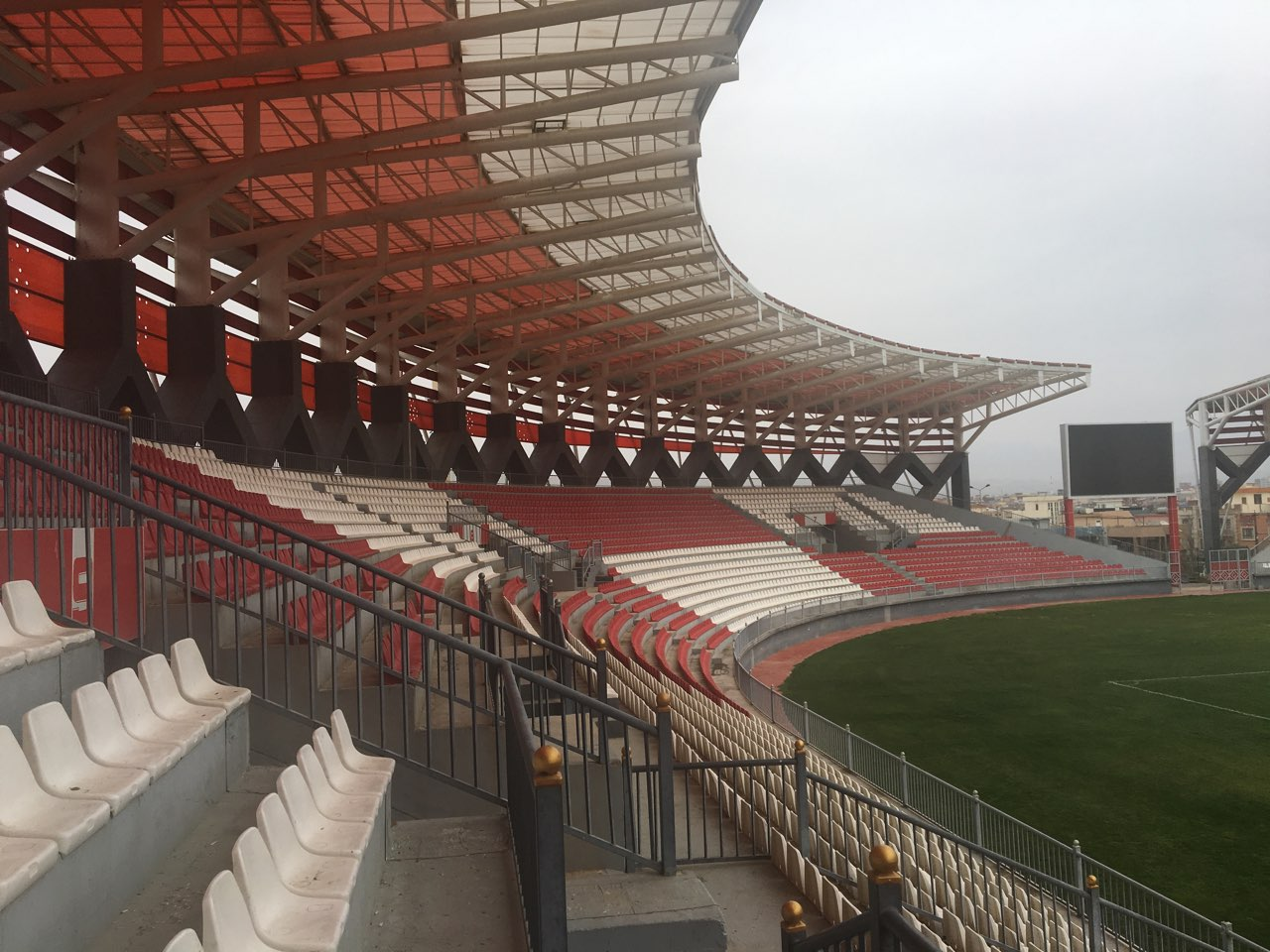
An electronic scoreboard is included.

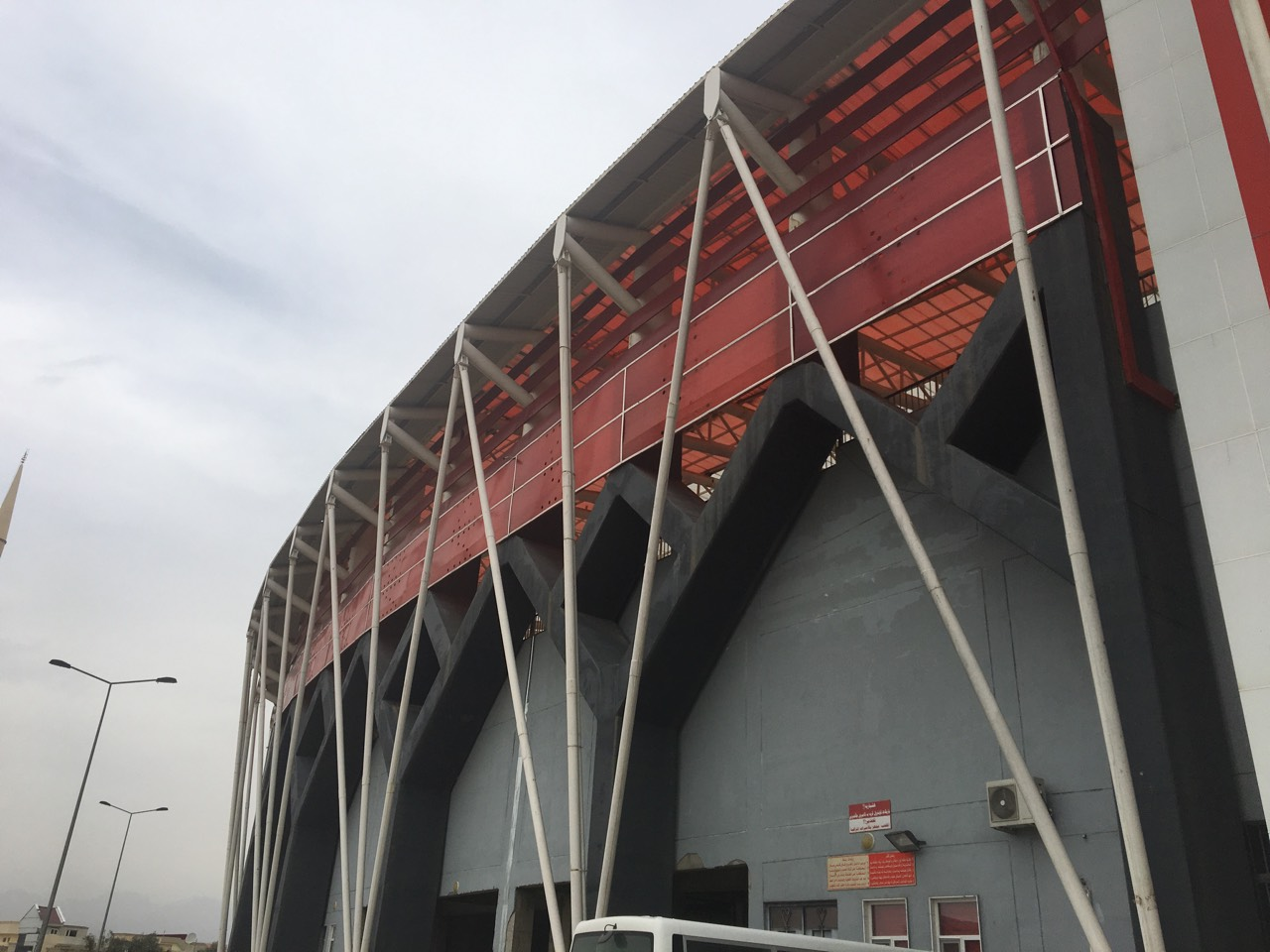
External facade of the stadium.

== See also ==
- List of football stadiums in Iraq
