= 2023–24 Al-Mina'a SC season =

Al-Mina'a SC
2023–24 season
- Chairman: Farhan Al-Farttousi (until 11 Oct.); Ahmed Khalaf Thijeel (from 11 Oct. until 20 Nov.); Alaa Abdul Khaliq (from 20 Nov.until 11 Jan.); Farhan Al-Farttousi (from 11 Jan.)
- Manager: Qahtan Chathir (until 4 Nov.); Asaad Abdul Razzaq (from 4 Nov. until 19 Nov.); Hassan Ahmed (from 19 Nov.)
- Ground: Basra Sports City (until 29 Dec.); Al-Minaa Olympic Stadium (from 26 Jan.)
- Iraq Stars League: 12th
- FA Cup: Quarter-finals
- Top goalscorer: League: Karrar Jaafar; Sajjad Alaa (8 goals); All: Karrar Jaafar; Sajjad Alaa (8 goals)
Home colours	Away colours

The 2023–24 season was Al-Minaa's first season in the newly-formed Iraq Stars League, and their 47th season in the top division of Iraq football.

== Review ==
=== Background ===
After Al-Minaa was relegated from the Premier League, it was able, within one season, to return and promote again to the Premier League, where the club was able to win the Division One title in the previous season, after defeating Amanat Baghdad (2-1) in the final match, the club's management promised the fans that it would prepare greatly to support the team to compete for the league title. In August, the club signed a contract with coach Qahtan Chathir with his assistant staff to lead the team in the league. Chathir announced in the press conference upon signing the contract that he does not promise to win the league this season, but rather promises to form a good team that achieves good results, because the team is playing for the first time in the Iraq Stars League after promotion from the Division One, and because there is no financial possibility to sign with super players in present time.

=== Summer transfer window ===
The summer transfer window opened on 5 August 2023. Al-Minaa announced their first signing of the summer on 9 August with 26-year-old Iraqi winger Mueen Ahmed joining the club from Premier League side Al-Najaf. Mueen Ahmed started with Al-Najaf in 2017, and during six seasons he scored 17 goals, and he previously played for Iraq national under-23 football team in the 2020 AFC U-23 Championship, and he plays in the central midfielder position. But on 25 September, the Al-Najaf administration negotiated with the Al-Minaa administration to return the player. Al-Minaa agreed to allow him and terminated his contract, and Al-Najaf thanked Al-Minaa for its cooperation.

On 10 August, the Al-Minaa confirmed that they had signed 31-year-old Iraqi defender Niaz Mohammed from Newroz. Niaz previously played for Erbil, Al-Shorta, Naft Al-Wasat and Newroz, during which he scored 6 goals, and was also on the initial list of the Iraq national football team that coach Katanec called up for the 2019 WAFF Championship. Al-Minaa also announced that 27-year-old Iraqi midfielder Yasser Naeem had joined the club from Premier League side Al-Talaba. He previously played for Al-Karkh, Karbalaa, Al-Kahrabaa, Amanat Baghdad and Al-Sinaat Al-Kahrabaiya. He also played for the Iraq national under-20 football team in 2012 under the leadership of coach Hakim Shaker, but he was excluded from the squad that participated in the 2013 FIFA U-20 World Cup.

On 11 August, Al-Minaa confirmed that they had signed 26-year-old Iraqi winger Ali Khalil from Naft Al-Basra. He started playing for Al-Samawa, then moved to Al-Talaba, then Naft Al-Basra, during which he scored 9 goals.

On 12 August, the Al-Minaa confirmed that they had signed 27-year-old Iraqi goalkeeper Abed Saleem from Al-Karkh. Abed Saleem started playing in Al-Ramadi, then moved to Al-Karkh, and won the 2021–22 Iraq FA Cup with them. He is considered one of the most talented goalkeepers in Iraq, and the press called for him to be included in the national team. Al-Minaa also announced that 23-year-old Iraqi central midfielder Mohammed Zamel had joined the club from Al-Najaf. He previously played for Al-Hudood, Naft Al-Wasat, Al-Talaba and Al-Quwa Al-Jawiya, during which he scored 12 goals in Premier League.

Al-Minaa announced on 16 August that three first-team players and academy graduates Haider Salem, Abbas Yas and Salem Ahmed had signed a new contract. The club also renewed the contract of three other players from the first team and academy graduates the next day, they are Jaafar Shenaishil, Hassan Odah and Mohammed Khudhair.

On 17 August, the Al-Minaa confirmed that they had signed 25-year-old Iraqi striker Ahmed Lafta from Naft Al-Wasat. Lafta started playing in the club of his city, Al-Furat, the club’s fans called him (Koné), likening him to the French player Manu Koné, after which he moved to play in the Premier League for Al-Karkh, Al-Najaf, Al-Quwa Al-Jawiya and Naft Al-Wasat. From the 2021 season until last season, he scored 28 goals for the clubs he played for. On the same day, the club announced that it had signed a contract with its former player Hussam Malik, who moved from Al-Minaa to Naft Al-Basra in the season before last, and returned this season to sign his contract with Al-Minaa again. On August 19, the club's management renewed the contracts of four players, namely Abdullah Mohsin, Hamza Hadi Ahmed, Sajjad Alaa, and Mohammed Sabah.

On 21 August, the club confirmed that they had signed 22-year-old defender Hussein Amer from Al-Sinaat Al-Kahrabaiya. The player was part of the Iraq national under-23 football team squad that won the 2023 WAFF U-23 Championship. He started playing in the club of his city, Al-Khidhir, then moved last season to Al-Sinaat Al-Kahrabaiya in the Division One, and he will play for the first time in the Pro League.

On 28 August, Al-Minaa announced that it had signed a contract with its former player the left back Hamza Adnan from Al-Quwa Al-Jawiya. The player moved three seasons ago from Al-Minaa to Baghdad, where he played for Al-Talaba and Al-Quwa Al-Jawiya. Three days after that, and within eight days, the club renewed the contracts of four players, namely Karrar Al-Amir Ali, Karrar Jaafar, Muslim Mousa and Ayad Abed Farhan.

On 8 September, the Al-Minaa confirmed that they had signed 29-year-old Iraqi striker Murtaja Adel Nasser from Duhok. Murtaja is the son of the club’s vice president, Adel Nasser, and his contract sparked ridicule from the club’s fans and social media users, as he represents a recurring phenomenon among successive Al-Minaa club presidents, who force coaches to sign their sons to play within the squad despite their poor technical level. Murtaja only scored one goal last season for Duhok, and before that, the last goal he scored was back in April 2021.

On 13 September, the club announced the promotion of five players from the club’s academy to the first team, namely Ali Abdul Amir, Mohammed Thair, Hassan Hamed, Amir Shaker, and Hamid Ali. The academy team finished as runner-up after losing the 2022–23 Iraq Youth League title in the final match against the Erbil Academy team on penalties, although it did not lose any match during the league, but it was unable to maintain the title that won it in the previous season.

On 16 September, the Al-Minaa confirmed that they had signed 26-year-old Iraqi right back Salah Hassan from Naft Al-Basra, and 25-year-old Iraqi right back Ibrahim Khalaf from Al-Naft. The club also contracted with Tunisian fitness coach Abdullah Slimani, who began training the team upon his arrival to the club.

On 25 September, the club announced the promotion of six players from the Club’s Reserve team to the first team, namely Abdul Aziz Faisal, Zain Al-Abidin Hussein, Hassan Faleh, Muntadhar Hassan, Mohammed Saadoun, and Mujtaba Ali. The reserve team won the 2022–23 Iraqi reserve league title for the first division after defeating the Al-Sinaat Al-Kahrabaiya reserve team in the final match with a score of 2–0.

On 26 September, Al-Minaa announced the arrival of 5 out of 6 foreign professionals to the club’s headquarters. The club had contracted with them, and the sixth was still waiting for the visa to be completed. The club announced that it would officially present them when their registration was completed. The players are the Cameroonians Ernest Thierry Anang and Regis Baha, the Nigeriens Abdoulaye Boureima Katkoré and Abdoulaye Karim Doudou, the Brazilian Jaílson and the Ivorian Didier Koré.

=== Pre-season ===
Three days after completing the signings, Al-Minaa played their first pre-season friendly match, at the Basra Sports City stadium, against Division One side Al-Bahri on 29 September. Al-Bahri player Yousef Aziz scored the only goal in the match, as the match ended 0–1 to Al-Bahri, as Al-Minaa played the match without its professionals. Al-Minaa faced Division Three side Abi Al-Khaseeb at Basra Sports City, on 3 October. Abdoulaye Karim Doudou, Hussam Malik, Sajjad Alaa, Ayad Abed Farhan and Mohammed Khudhair each scored one goal in the match, helping the team win 5–1. Then Al-Minaa faced Division Three side Al-Noor at Basra Sports City, on 9 October. Murtaja Adel Nasser, Hamza Adnan and Ibrahim Khalaf each scored goal in the match, helping the team win 3–2. The team returned to face Al-Bahri again on October 12. Murtaja Adel Nasser and Abdullah Mohsin each scored a goal in the match, and one of the Al-Bahri players scored an own goal to help Al-Minaa win 3–2.

After the end of the internal camp, which the team concluded with a match against Al-Bahri, the team was supposed to enter an external camp in Kuwait, but the delay in obtaining the visa canceled travel there. The team changed its destination to Baghdad to enter an external camp and play two matches. In the first match, Al-Minaa faced Iraq Stars League side Al-Karkh at Al-Saher Ahmed Radhi Stadium on 16 October. The match continued in a goalless draw, until the 90th minute, when Muhammad Abdul Rahman scored a goal from a free kick for Al-Karkh, making Al-Minaa lose 1–0. Al-Minaa played without 6 of its players, including Niger national team players Abdoulaye Boureima Katkoré and Abdoulaye Karim Doudou, who played with the national team during the international break in a match against Somalia and won 3–0. And including Iraqi young defender Hussein Amer, who joined the U-23 national team, which traveled to Morocco to play two friendly matches against Morocco and the Dominican Republic, where they won the matches 1–0 and 3–1, respectively. In the second friendly match, Al-Minaa faced Amanat Baghdad, at the Al-Kahrabaa Stadium, Hussam Malik and Ernest Thierry Anang scored Al-Minaa’s goals to defeat Amanat Baghdad 0–2.

=== Administrative problems ===
On 18 September, the Federal Court of Cassation decided to invalidate the Al-Minaa Club elections, which took place on January 26, 2023, after the lawsuit filed by the former president of club, Jalil Hanoon. On 11 October, the Iraqi Olympic Committee decided to dissolve the club’s administrative body and appoint a temporary administrative body headed by Ahmed Khalaf Thijeel, with elections to be held to choose a new body within a period of three months.

=== Summer transfer ban ===
In May 2023, the Iraqi Football Association received a notice from FIFA informing it of banning Al-Minaa Club from summer transfer contracts, due to previous debts owed by the administration for the dues of professional players who played for the team and who filed an official complaint for the FIFA. At that time, Al-Mina Club management announced that there were no debts or a ban on the club from registering players, indicating that the FIFA decision was “temporary” and the issue would be resolved and settled before the start of the Iraq Stars League next season. However, after the completion of the summer transfers and the holding of the league draw and a few days before the start of the tournament, the club was informed by FIFA not to approve the registration of the new players due to the ban. The club was informed that it must limit itself to players from the previous season to participate in the league, and the remaining players of the previous season were only 11 players. As a result, the coaching staff revealed two days before the first round match that he would leave the task of leading the football team for this reason.

=== Late October (league start) ===
Al-Minaa played their first home game of the season against Al-Kahrabaa in Basra Sports City on October 27. The team entered this match with a significant shortage of players due to the ban imposed by FIFA, as it played without professionals, and excluded all the players who were contracted in the summer, so that the number of remaining players was only 12 players, to whom 4 players from the academy were added, and the team was led by coach Qahtan Chathir. Mahmoud Khalil opened the scoring in the 16th minute for Al-Kahrabaa, and doubled their lead on 23 minutes when Amir Faisal cut inside and arrowed into the right corner. In the 57th minute, Ayad Abed Farhan scored for Al-Minaa, but the goal was canceled after returning to VAR. In the 64th minute, Al-Minaa won a penalty kick, which Ayad Abed Farhan took, but the Al-Kahrabaa goalkeeper Ali Ebadi was able to block it. In the 90th minute, Hassan Odah pulled a goal back for Al-Minaa from a close shot, Anael Barga Ngoba sealed the match with a third goal for the visitors in extra time, ending the match with Al-Minaa losing 1–3. The game also saw League debutant academy players Mohammed Ghaleb and Hameed Ali Hameed as substitutes in 56th, 85th minutes from match.

The Al-Minaa administration tried to search for a solution before the second match to register the reserve team players in the first team squad, but to no avail, and only two players from the previous season were registered, namely Mohammed Shokan and Muslim Mousa. The team played its second match when it was a guest of the Al-Karkh at Al-Saher Ahmed Radhi Stadium on October 31. Al-Minaa started scoring through Hameed Ali with a powerful shot in the 13th minute, and the referee awarded a penalty kick to Al-Karkh in the 25th minute, after returning to the VAR, after which the match was stopped when the coaching staff for Al-Minaa decided to withdraw in protest against the decision, then they retracted the withdrawal, and the Al-Minaa goalkeeper Mohammed Sabah was able to blocked the penalty kick taken by Omar Nouri, but Al-Karkh was after that able to score 4 goals, causing Al-Minaa to lose 4–1.

=== November ===
The Al-Minaa management tried to postpone the team’s match, which was supposed to play against Al-Shorta on November 3, due to the lack of players who will participate in the match due to the injuries and stress that some of them suffered during previous matches, in addition to the FIFA penalty that prevented the club from concluding new contracts. However, the Iraqi Football Association refused to postpone the match. Al-Minaa team entered the match with only 7 players and no substitutes. In the 5th minute, Al-Shorta striker Mohanad Ali scored a goal for the visitors. Shortly after that, Al-Minaa player Mohammed Khudhair was injured and left the match. The referee announced the end of the match with Al-Shorta winning 3–0, as the football law does not allow Continuously playing with less than 7 players for both teams.

Starting line-up for the Iraq Stars League home match against Al-Qasim on 23 November 2023

After the incident of the match against Al-Shorta, the club management decided to agree to terminate the contract of the technical staff led by Qahtan Chathir by mutual consent. They also decided to terminate the contracts of the six professionals and the 15 local players who were contracted this summer by mutual consent. A committee was formed to study the causes of the current crisis, contract with a new coach, and focus on forming a team of Academy players to complete league matches.

Al-Minaa's temporary administration decided to sign a contract with coach Asaad Abdul Razzaq, assisted by academy coach Mohammed Abdul Hussein and goalkeeper coach Medhat Abdul Hussein, who are from sons of the club. An agreement was reached with the new staff, and they traveled with the team to Sulaymaniyah to play with Newroz in the fourth round of the league. Al-Minaa played its match against Newroz with only 16 players, and was able to impose a goalless draw on the host team in its stadium and in front of its fans, and obtain the first point in the league. The club's management considered that a draw in such circumstances was a good start to correct the team's path.

But coach Abdul Razzaq did not officially contract, and did not reach an agreement with the club’s management, and their negotiations with him failed, and it was said that he does not have an AFC Pro-Diploma, which the Football Association requires that league coaches possess, while team supervisor Ali Fadhel said that Abdul Razzaq withdrew due to his poor health condition. On November 19, the administration announced the hiring of coach Hassan Ahmed, along with his assistant staff, Nasser Talla Dahilan, Mahmoud Yasser, and Qusay Jabbar, and they led the training unit on the same day.

In the first match of the new technical staff, on November 23 at Al-Fayhaa Stadium in Basra, the Al-Minaa team was able to defeat Al-Qasim 1–0, as Haider Salem scored with a header in the 17th minute, when Shokan raised the ball and Salem received it with his head and shot it on the left side of Al-Qasim’s goalkeeper, who he was unable to push it away, so it entered the net, and thus the team achieved its first victory, and got the first 3 full points in the league. Al-Minaa coach Hassan Ahmed said in the press conference after the match: Winning this match is a gift we offer to the club’s fans on the occasion of its 92nd anniversary. We only have 16 players and 2 goalkeepers, most of whom are young, and this represents a great challenge for any coach.

=== December ===
In the sixth round match, Al-Minaa faced Naft Maysan at Maysan Olympic Stadium on December 1. The match was led by referee Laith Farhan, and ended in favor of Naft Maysan 3–0, as Alaa Al Dali scored a hat-trick in minutes 45+5, 69, 90+11. Coach Hassan Ahmed said after the match in a radio interview that the referee awarded three goals that were not valid goals, and refused to go back to VAR, and that the reason for the referee’s decisions was bias in favor of Naft Maysan, because the club has influential people within the Football Association and they are the ones who chose the referees in order to provide services for Naft Maysan to win. These statements led to creating a crisis between the two clubs, and as a result, the Naft Maysan Administration filed a complaint against the Al-Minaa coach, while the Al-Minaa Administration apologized to the Naft Maysan Administration, and decided to ban the statements completely in order to avoid misunderstanding, and to limit themselves to press conferences after the matches. Ahmed later confirmed that his statements were interpreted incorrectly, and that he did not want to offend Naft Maysan's management, but rather wanted to relieve pressure on his players, and he said words fail me.

In the seventh round match, Al-Minaa faced Al-Najaf at home on December 6. Younes Hamoud scored early for the visitors in the 4th minute, and before the end of the first half, Karrar Jaafar scored the equalizer for Al-Minaa with a missile strike from outside the 18-yards line in the 43rd minute. Five minutes later, Sajjad Alaa scored the second goal from a rebound from Al-Najaf goalkeeper Sarhang Muhsin after blacking Shokan’s free kick. In the second half, Al-Minaa completed the match with 9 players after Mohammed Shokan and Hameed Ali Hameed were sent off, but they were able to win and the team rose to 15th place in the standings. The team's coach, Hassan Ahmed, said in the press conference that my team will make Al-Fayhaa Stadium a graveyard for its competitors in the Iraq Stars League. He was chosen as the best coach in the seventh round of the league. Karrar Jaafar's goal against goalkeeper Sarhang Muhsin was considered a rare incident, as Karrar is considered the youngest player in the league (16 years old), while Sarhang is the oldest goalkeeper in the league (37 years old), and when he was playing with the national team in 2006, Karrar had not born yet.

Starting line-up for the Iraq Stars League away match against Al-Talaba on 9 December 2023

In the eighth round of the league, Al-Minaa continued to cause surprises when it defeated Al-Talaba in its stadium and in front of its fans on December 9, with a score of 1–0. Sajjad Alaa scored the victory goal for Al-Minaa in the 45th + 7th minute after penetrating from the right, shooting a creeping ball to the right of goalkeeper Dolvan Mahdi. Al-Talaba player Hassan Ashour was sent off in the 38th minute due to his insulting the Al-Minaa substitutes bench. With this victory, Al-Minaa jumped to tenth place with 10 points. Al-Minaa goalkeeper Jaafar Shenaishil was chosen as the best player in the match. In the ninth round match, Al-Minaa faced Erbil at home on December 14. The match was ended in favor of Erbil 0–3. Coach Ahmed held the players responsible for the loss, and said in the press conference after the match that the players had become arrogant and began to play individually and stayed away from team play, and he held the right-back, Hameed Ali Hameed, responsible for the three goals that team conceded.

In the tenth round match, Al-Minaa faced Naft Al-Wasat at Al-Najaf International Stadium on December 19, in the absence of two of its most important players, Abdullah Mohsin and Hassan Odeh, with the team suffering from a numerical deficiency this season. The match ended in a scoreless draw. After the end of the match, the head of the referees’ committee, Najah Rehem, admitted that the match referee, Sajjad Khalid, made a mistake in not awarding a clear penalty kick in favor of Al-Minaa, despite his use the VAR. In the eleventh round of the league, Al-Minaa received at its home stadium its traditional rival, Naft Al-Basra, in the Basra derby on December 22. Al-Minaa was the better team in the match, and was able to advance with a goal scored by Mohammed Shokan with a header, but Naft Al-Basra scored the equalizer in the last minutes, so the match ended with a score of 1–1. After the end of the derby match, Naft Al-Basra coach Abdul-Wahab Abu Al-Hail resigned, as the Basra derby matches was frequently known for the dismissal and resignation of coaches.

On December 24, the temporary management of Al-Minaa decided to appoint former club player Abbas Hassan as supervisor of the first football team. In the twelfth round of the league, Karbalaa hosted Al-Minaa at its home stadium in a match that included the reopening of the stadium after its maintenance. It was the last round before stopping in order to make way for the national team to play in 2023 AFC Asian Cup in Qatar next month. Karbalaa scored first through Abdul-Qadir Tariq in the 20th minute, and Al-Minaa's equalizing goal came from a penalty kick successfully executed by Mohammed Shokan in the 26th minute, and in the 33rd minute, Al-Minaa's second lead goal came from player Muslim Mousa, so the match ended with Al-Minaa winning 1–2. Coach Hassan Ahmed said in the press conference after the match: Our team is young, and everyone knows the difficult circumstance that Al-Minaa is going through, as it was relying on young people, but they proved their position and ability to defend the standing of club, which deserves a lot from us to reach safety and remain in the Stars League. The victory over the Karbalaa team was not easy. I put in my calculations to come out with a one point, and play to win at the same time according to the course of the match, and we played until the last minute offensively, playing with two attackers. We had three clear chances to score in the last five minutes when Karbalaa rushed to adjust the score. But we did not score more goals. And the official sponsor of the team, General Manager of GCPI, Farhan Al-Farttousi, confirmed after the victory over Karbalaa that Al-Minaa is a great fan club, and we must all stand with it and provide more support and assistance to it.

=== January ===
On January 10, the draw for the Iraq FA Cup, round of 32, was held, and the 26th and 27th of same month were set as the start dates for the round of 32 matches. The draw pitted Al-Minaa against Al-Diwaniya, where the match will take place in Basra. The club announced that it will start playing home matches at Al-Minaa Olympic Stadium starting from the next rounds in the league, and despite the start of the winter transfer period at the beginning of January, FIFA informed the club of the decision to ban new players during this winter transfer period.

On January 11, the Iraqi Olympic Committee formed a temporary administrative body to manage Al-Minaa, after the end of the previous temporary management period and the cancellation of its duties. The new interim body consisted of Farhan Muhaisen Ghudhaib as president, Alaa Abdul Khaleq Hajim as vice president, Raad Malik Sharqi as secretary, Bahaa Al-Deen Hussein as financial secretary, in addition to the members Mohammed Abdul Hussein, Yousef Rehaima. Adel Nasser, Ali Taleb Sharhan, and Aqeel Hato. The Iraqi Olympic Committee set a period of three months to assign the current temporary management of Al-Minaa, according to the Clubs Law.

During the international break, Al-Minaa played a friendly match on January 16 against Naft Al-Basra, and the match ended in a goalless draw. Two days later, Al-Minaa played against Al-Noor, and won by four goals. Salem Ahmed scored two goals, Mohammed Shokan one, and Mohammed Khudhair one. Jaafar Shenaishil and Sajjad Alaa were absent from the team due to their joining the training camp with the Iraq national under-23 football team, as well as Karrar Jaafar, Mohammed Ghaleb and Muslim Mousa due to their joining the external camp with the Iraq national under-20 football team. On January 22, five players from the reserve team were transferred to the first team during the winter transfer period, and they are Mohammed Saadoun, Emad Yousef, Muntadhar Hassan, Hatim Aysar, and Zain Al-Abidin Hussein. And on January 25, Karrar ِAl-Amir Ali’s loan period to Al-Qasim team ended and he joined Al-Minaa team trainings. On January 26, the team faces Al-Diwaniya at home in the FA Cup, in the absence of eight of them players. The five who joined the national teams, as well as Abdullah Mohsin, Hassan Odeh and Hussein Jabbar due to injury. But Al-Diwaniya did not come to the stadium on the day of the match, so Al-Minaa was considered the winner of the match with a score of 3–0 and passed to the next round, where Al-Minaa will face Naft Al-Wasat at its home stadium, according to the draw held on January 28.

=== February ===
On February 3, the second round matches of the FA Cup began, with Al-Minaa facing Naft Al-Wasat, which was held at Al-Minaa Olympic Stadium, as Al-Minaa’s first official match in its new stadium. Before the match, the Naft Al-Wasat team confirmed that it was coming to achieve victory, but the Al-Minaa players controlled the match from the beginning, and were able to score three goals. The first by Ayad Abed Farhan in the first half, and the second and third by Salem Ahmed and Hameed Ali Hameed in the second half. The match was scored 3-1, and Al-Minaa qualified for the next round of the tournament. On 5 February, the club's youth team goalkeeper, Ammar Ali, was promoted to the first team, that played as goalkeeper for the Iraq national under-17 football team in the 2023 WAFF U-15 Championship.

Starting line-up for the Iraq Stars League home match against Duhok on 29 February 2024

On February 10, the league resumed after the international break. The thirteenth round witnessed Al-Minaa facing Al-Quwa Al-Jawiya in Al-Araqa derby, Al-Quwa Al-Jawiya is at the top of the teams standings without a loss and includes most of the national team’s players. The match began with the host team taking control, resulting in a goal for Ali Jasim in the 11th minute. In the 28th minute, Al-Minaa player Salem Ahmed managed to score the equalizer with a header. Aymen Hussein returned to take the lead for Al-Quwa Al-Jawiya in the 33rd minute. At the beginning of the second half, Hussein was able to score the third goal, so Salem Ahmed returned to reduce the score in the 54th minute. Hussein sealed the fourth goal in the last minute of the match, so he scored a hat-trick and the match ended 4–2 in favor of Al-Quwa Al-Jawiya.

On February 16, Al-Minaa faced Al-Hudood in the home match. The visitors took the lead in the first half, and Karar Jaafar equalized for Al-Minaa in the last minute of extra time for the match. On February 21, Al-Minaa faced Zakho in the home match. The first half ended goalless. Frank Cédric Abogo scored a two goals for the visitors, so the match ended with Al-Minaa losing 0–2. On February 24, Al-Minaa played an away match against Al-Naft, the match was led by referee Yousef Saeed. Okiki Afolabi scored in the 11th minute for Al-Naft, and in the 19th minute, Sajjad Alaa scored an equalizer for Al-Minaa, and the match continued until the end with a draw result. After the match, and in a TV show determining the validity of the referees’ decisions in the league, the two former international referees, Raad Saleem and Hazem Hussein, confirmed that the match referee, Yousef Saeed, should have awarded a penalty kick in favor of Al-Minaa when Al-Minaa’s Mohammed Khudhair was tripped by the Al-Naft defender Hussein Tariq in the 5th minute.

On February 27, the draw for the round of 16 for the FA Cup was held, and the draw pitted Al-Minaa to face Al-Hudood. On February 29, Al-Minaa faced Duhok, which was ranked third in the teams standings in the league. Al-Minaa entered the match having prepared well, but it was missing the services of its most important players, namely Mohammed Shokan and Abdullah Mohsin due to injury, and Mohammed Khudhair due to the red card, in addition to the injury of Ayad Abed Farhan in training, and the remaining players are only 11 players. Al-Minaa was able to take advantage of playing on its home field and among its fans to win points in the match, as Salem Ahmed scored the first goal in the 27th minute with a header, and in the 73rd minute, Sajjad Alaa added the second goal. The match ended with Al-Minaa winning 2–0. In the press conference after the end of the match, coach Hassan Ahmed praised the skills of his players and their good implementation of his instructions, while Duhok coach Ahmed Khalaf confirmed that the level of the Al-Minaa players had amazed him. As a result, Hassan Ahmed was chosen as the best coach in this round.

=== March ===
On March 5, Al-Minaa team faced Amanat Baghdad in away match in the 18th round of the league. The match was led by referee Mohammed Kamel, and he sent off two players from the host team. Until the last minutes, the match seemed to be heading towards a goalless draw, but in the 89th minute Al-Minaa got a corner kick was executed by Hameed Ali Hameed. He sent the ball to Mujtaba Ali’s head, who headed it towards the goal, but it hit the crossbar and bounced off to hit the head of Amanat Baghdad defender Ali Abbas and enter the goal. Thus, the match ended with Al-Minaa winning with a score of 1–0. And in a TV show determining the validity of the referees’ decisions in the league, the two former international referees, Raad Saleem and Hazem Hussein, confirmed that the match referee, Mohammed Kamel, should have awarded a penalty kick in favor of Al-Minaa when Al-Minaa’s Salem Ahmed was tripped by the Amanat Baghdad defender Raad Fanar in the 32th minute.

Starting line-up for the Iraq Stars League away match against Amanat Baghdad on 5 March 2024

On March 9, Al-Minaa faced Al-Zawraa in a home match, and lost 1–3. Ali Sadeq, Ahmed Jalal, and Murad Mohammed scored for Al-Zawraa, while Karrar Jaafar reduced the score for Al-Minaa in extra time. And in a TV show determining the validity of the referees’ decisions in the league, the two former international referees, Raad Saleem and Hazem Hussein, confirmed that the match referee, Ali Hussein Ali, should have awarded a penalty kick in favor of Al-Minaa when Al-Minaa’s Salem Ahmed was tripped by the Al-Zawraa player Murad Mohammed in the 53rd minute.

After numerous cases of repeated disregard for the calculation of penalty kicks due to the team by the referees, the club management issued a statement in which it called on the Football Association to include foreign referees and foreign VAR referees in the team’s matches, after they lost confidence in the local referees.

In the Round of 16 of the AF cup, Al-Minaa faced Al-Hudood on March 14 at Al-Minaa Olympic Stadium, and Salem Ahmed was able to score the winning goal in the 23rd minute after receiving an assist from Ayad Abed Farhan, and the match ended with Al-Minaa winning 1-0, moving on to the quarter-finals to face Al-Shorta.

During the international break, players Jaafar Shenaishil, Mujtaba Ali, Sajjad Alaa, and Salem Ahmed joined the U-23 team’s training in Basra in preparation for participating in the 2024 AFC U-23 Asian Cup in Qatar, which qualifies for the 2024 Summer Olympics men's football tournament. Meanwhile, players Mohammed Ghaleb, Muslim Mousa, and Karrar Jaafar joined the U-20 team to play in the 2024 WAFF U-23 Championship in Saudi Arabia, starting from March 20 to 26.

During the international break, after the end of the first phase of the league, and after FIFA allowed Al-Minaa to sign professionals players if they were free, the club’s management was able to sign four African professionals who play in different positions.

=== April ===
After the end of the international break and the resumption of the league, the Al-Minaa team prepared to face Naft Al-Basra in the twentieth round, where it trained under the leadership of assistant coach Nasser Talla Dahilan, as coach Hassan Ahmed was in an AFC Pro-Diploma course, and returned before the day of the match. On April 1, the Basra derby began at the Al-Minaa Olympic Stadium, and Al-Minaa was able to win against Naft Al-Basra with a goal scored by Mohammed Shokan from a penalty kick in 40th. On April 6, Al-Minaa hosted Al-Karkh, in the absence of two of its most important players due to the accumulation of yellow cards, namely Mohammed Khudhair and Haider Salem, and lost the match with a score of 1-3, as Abbas Yas scored for Al-Minaa with a powerful shot from outside the 18 area. On April 9, Al-Minaa faced Al-Shorta in the quarter-finals of the AF cup in Basra. The match ended 2-0 in favor of the visitors, and Al-Minaa was eliminated from the tournament. What was strange about this match was the small number of Al-Minaa fans who attended the match, in contrast to what the fans were accustomed to in previous matches, as a large percentage of them attended to support their young team in previous matches. After the match ended, the club’s media official criticized the match referee in a television interview, and said that when you assign the task to a referee who is not qualified to lead the match, you have committed a crime against Al-Minaa and its fans. He continued, saying, “I blame the Football Association and the Referees Committee because they do not respect clubs outside the capital and consider them complementary numbers only.”.

On April 14, Al-Minaa faced the leaders of the standings, Al-Shorta, in the away match. The team was able to force a draw in the first half, but at the end of the half, midfielder Haidar Salem was sent off, and the match ended with Al-Shorta winning 2-0 after Al-Minaa played a good game defensively, and also missed several opportunities to score goals. In the press conference after the match, Al-Shorta players admitted that they faced a stubborn opponent, while Al-Minaa coach Ahmed said that the sent off of player Haider Salem affected the team, as they played with ten players, and there were injured players who missed the match, and the team also lacked the presence of a striker, as the striker The only one is Salem Ahmed, who was called by coach Radhi Shenaishil to the ranks of the U-23 team to participate in the 2024 AFC U-23 Asian Cup, and he played his first match against Thailand on April 16.

On April 17, the coach Ahmed, announced the completion of contract procedures with four African professional players to include them in the team, after about 45 days of delay, due to the delay in issuing the Iraqi visa for more than a month and a half, and today it has been officially issued, and he said that two of them They play as a centre-back, two as a defensive midfielder and one as a striker. Their names have not been announced yet.

On April 21, Al-Minaa faced Karbalaa. Al-Minaa was able to advance with a goal through Karrar Jaafar, but Karbalaa equalized the score after only 3 minutes, and the match ended with a score of 1-1. Al-Minaa had scored a second goal in the 87th minute by Muslim Mousa, which was not counted by referee Amjad Kamel. In a TV show determining the correctness of the referees’ decisions in the league, former international referees Raad Saleem and Haitham Mohammed Ali confirmed that the match referee, Amjad Kamel, should have awarded the goal in favor of Al-Minaa, because the ball had entered the goal before the Karbalaa defender pushed it out of the goal. On April 24, Al-Minaa faced Newroz and lost 4-1,

On April 24, the club announced the arrival of the four professionals to Baghdad, and on the 27th they joined the team in Basra. The first professional is the Liberia national team striker and captain, William Jebor, the second is the Ivorian defender Habib Omar Fofana, and the third and fourth are the two defensive midfielders the Nigerian Dare Olatunji and the Ivorian Yusuf Touré. On April 30, Al-Minaa faced Zakho in the away match, and coach Ahmed included the four professionals in the starting lineup, and the match ended with Al-Minaa losing 3-1.

=== May ===
In the 26th round of the league, Al-Minaa faced Erbil in the away match in 5 May. Erbil first advanced through an own goal scored by Al-Minaa defender Mujtaba Ali against his team in the 43rd minute, and Karrar Jaafar was able to equalize the score in extra time of the first half with an assist from William Jebor, and in At the beginning of the second half, and for the second time, with an assist from Jebor, Mohammed Shokan scored the winning goal for Al-Minaa with a long-range missile shot. Coach Ahmed said in the press conference after the match: “I am proud of what the team presented and of achieving the three points. We are participating with a team with an average age of 16 and 17 years, and this is a double difficulty, but thank God we overcame all the difficulties.” He continued: “We now need 8 points to decide our survival in the Stars League, and we pledge to our fans that we will do everything in our power to achieve results that make them happy.”. On May 9, Al-Minaa faced Al-Naft at its home stadium in Basra. The match ended in a goalless draw. On May 12, Al-Minaa faced Al-Qasim at its away stadium in Karbalaa. The match ended in a goalless draw too.

== Players ==
=== Squad ===
Note: Flags indicate national team as defined under FIFA eligibility rules; some limited exceptions apply. Players may hold more than one non-FIFA nationality.

No.	Pos.	Nation	Player
1	GK	IRQ	Mohammed Saadoun
2	DF	IRQ	Abdullah Mohsin (captain)
4	DF	IRQ	Emad Yousef
5	MF	IRQ	Ahmed Mohsin Ashour
6	MF	IRQ	Haider Salem
7	MF	IRQ	Ayad Abed Farhan
9	FW	LBR	William Jebor
10	FW	IRQ	Mohammed Shokan (vice-captain)
11	MF	IRQ	Hatim Aysar
12	FW	IRQ	Karrar Jaafar
14	DF	CIV	Habib Omar Fofana
15	MF	IRQ	Mohammed Khudhair
16	MF	CIV	Yusuf Touré
17	DF	IRQ	Muntadhar Hassan
18	FW	IRQ	Salem Ahmed

No.	Pos.	Nation	Player
19	DF	IRQ	Hassan Odah
22	GK	IRQ	Jaafar Shenaishil
26	FW	IRQ	Sajjad Alaa
27	MF	NGA	Dare Olatunji
28	MF	IRQ	Hamza Hadi Ahmed
29	DF	IRQ	Karrar Al-Amir Ali
30	GK	IRQ	Ammar Ali
33	MF	IRQ	Abbas Yas (3rd captain)
35	DF	IRQ	Mujtaba Ali
36	DF	IRQ	Hameed Ali Hameed
38	DF	IRQ	Mahdi Hashim
39	MF	IRQ	Naji Nasser
40	DF	IRQ	Mohammed Ghaleb
42	DF	IRQ	Muslim Mousa
50	GK	IRQ	Mohammed Sabah

== New contracts and transfers ==
=== New contracts ===
Date	No.	Pos.	Name	Ref.
16 August 2023	6	DM	(Iraq) Haider Salem	
16 August 2023	18	ST	(Iraq) Salem Ahmed	
16 August 2023	33	CB	(Iraq) Abbas Yas	
17 August 2023	22	GK	(Iraq) Jaafar Shenaishil	
17 August 2023	19	LB	(Iraq) Hassan Odah	
17 August 2023	15	DM	(Iraq) Mohammed Khudhair	
19 August 2023	2	CB	(Iraq) Abdullah Mohsin	
19 August 2023	28	CM	(Iraq) Hamza Hadi Ahmed	
19 August 2023	26	RW	(Iraq) Sajjad Alaa	
19 August 2023	40	GK	(Iraq) Mohammed Sabah	
31 August 2023	29	RB	(Iraq) Karrar Al-Amir Ali	
7 September 2023	12	LW	(Iraq) Karrar Jaafar	
8 September 2023	42	LB	(Iraq) Muslim Mousa	
8 September 2023	7	AM	(Iraq) Ayad Abed Farhan	

=== Transfers in ===
Date	Pos.	Name	From	Fee	Ref.
9 August 2023	RW	(Iraq) Mueen Ahmed	(Iraq) Al-Najaf	Free transfer	
10 August 2023	CB	(Iraq) Niaz Mohammed	(Iraq) Newroz	Free transfer	
10 August 2023	AM	(Iraq) Yasser Naeem	(Iraq) Al-Talaba	Free transfer	
11 August 2023	LW	(Iraq) Ali Khalil	(Iraq) Naft Al-Basra	Free transfer	
12 August 2023	GK	(Iraq) Abed Saleem	(Iraq) Al-Karkh	Free transfer	
12 August 2023	CM	(Iraq) Mohammed Zamel	(Iraq) Al-Najaf	Free transfer	
17 August 2023	ST	(Iraq) Ahmed Lafta	(Iraq) Naft Al-Wasat	Free transfer	
17 August 2023	SS	(Iraq) Hussam Malik	(Iraq) Naft Al-Basra	Free transfer	
21 August 2023	CB	(Iraq) Hussein Amer	(Iraq) Al-Sinaat Al-Kahrabaiya	Free transfer	
28 August 2023	LB	(Iraq) Hamza Adnan	(Iraq) Al-Quwa Al-Jawiya	Free transfer	
8 September 2023	ST	(Iraq) Murtaja Adel Nasser	(Iraq) Duhok	Free transfer	
13 September 2023	LB	(Iraq) Ali Abdul Amir Hamish	Al-Minaa Academy	n/a	
13 September 2023	DM	(Iraq) Amir Shaker Shabib	Al-Minaa Academy	n/a	
13 September 2023	AM	(Iraq) Hassan Hamed Khalaf	Al-Minaa Academy	n/a	
13 September 2023	CB	(Iraq) Mohammed Thair Karim	Al-Minaa Academy	n/a	
13 September 2023	RB	(Iraq) Hameed Ali Hameed	Al-Minaa Academy	n/a	
16 September 2023	RB	(Iraq) Salah Hassan	(Iraq) Naft Al-Basra	Free transfer	
16 September 2023	RB	(Iraq) Ibrahim Khalaf	(Iraq) Al-Naft	Free transfer	
25 September 2023	RW	(Iraq) Abdul Aziz Faisal	Al-Minaa Reserve	n/a	
25 September 2023	DM	(Iraq) Hassan Faleh	Al-Minaa Reserve	n/a	
25 September 2023	RB	(Iraq) Mujtaba Ali	Al-Minaa Reserve	n/a	
26 September 2023	RB	(Brazil) Jaílson	(Iraq) Al-Talaba	Free transfer	
26 September 2023	DM	(Ivory Coast) Didier Koré	(Iraq) Naft Al-Wasat	Free transfer	
26 September 2023	ST	(Cameroon) Ernest Thierry Anang	(United Arab Emirates) Al-Dhaid	Free transfer	
26 September 2023	DM	(Cameroon) Regis Baha	(Serbia) Mladost Lučani	Free transfer	
26 September 2023	CB	(Niger) Abdoulaye Boureima Katkoré	(Niger) Douanes	Free transfer	
26 September 2023	CB	(Niger) Abdoulaye Karim Doudou	(Nigeria) Dakkada	Free transfer	
26 October 2023	CB	(Iraq) Mohammed Ghaleb	Al-Minaa Academy	n/a	
26 October 2023	AM	(Iraq) Naji Nasser	Al-Minaa Academy	n/a	
26 October 2023	CB	(Iraq) Mahdi Hashim	Al-Minaa Academy	n/a	
22 January 2024	RW	(Iraq) Hatim Aysar	Al-Minaa Reserve	n/a	
22 January 2024	CB	(Iraq) Emad Yousef	Al-Minaa Reserve	n/a	
22 January 2024	LB	(Iraq) Zain Al-Abidin Hussein	Al-Minaa Reserve	n/a	
22 January 2024	CB	(Iraq) Muntadhar Hassan	Al-Minaa Reserve	n/a	
22 January 2024	GK	(Iraq) Mohammed Saadoun	Al-Minaa Reserve	n/a	
5 February 2024	GK	(Iraq) Ammar Ali	Al-Minaa Academy	n/a	
April 2024	CB	(Ivory Coast) Habib Omar Fofana	(Belarus) Belshina Bobruisk	Free transfer	
April 2024	DM	(Ivory Coast) Yusuf Touré	(Oman) Dhofar	Free transfer	
April 2024	DM	(Nigeria) Dare Olatunji	(Georgia (country)) Samtredia	Free transfer	
April 2024	ST	(Liberia) William Jebor	(Malta) Valletta	Free transfer	

=== Transfers out ===
Date	Pos.	Name	To	Fee	Ref.
1 June 2023	CB	(Morocco) Abdelhakim Aklidou	Unattached	Released	
1 June 2023	AM	(Morocco) Soufiane Talal	Unattached	Released	
1 June 2023	ST	(France) Ghislain Guessan	Unattached	Released	
3 June 2023	CB	(Iraq) Mohammed Abdul-Zahra	Unattached	Released	
3 June 2023	GK	(Iraq) Haider Shejaa	(Iraq) Al-Naft	Loan return	
2 August 2023	AM	(Brazil) Dioguinho	(Brazil) Amazonas	Free transfer	
3 August 2023	CB	(Burkina Faso) Mohamed Ouattara	(Iraq) Al-Naft	Free transfer	
18 August 2023	ST	(Iraq) Asahr Ali	Unattached	Released	
18 August 2023	ST	(Iraq) Abdullah Abdul Wahed	Unattached	Released	
18 August 2023	RW	(Iraq) Mohammed Salah	Unattached	Released	
18 August 2023	DM	(Iraq) Hussein Abdul Karim	Unattached	Released	
19 August 2023	GK	(Iraq) Ali Faisal	(Iraq) Al-Zawraa	Free transfer	
10 September 2023	CB	(Iraq) Karrar Jumaa	(Iraq) Naft Al-Basra	Free transfer	
25 September 2023	RW	(Iraq) Mueen Ahmed	(Iraq) Al-Najaf	Termination of contract	
5 October 2023	LB	(Iraq) Haider Sari	(Iraq) Masafi Al-Junoob	Free transfer	
5 October 2023	LB	(Iraq) Ali Abdul Amir Hamish	(Iraq) Masafi Al-Junoob	Free transfer	
5 October 2023	RW	(Iraq) Abdul Aziz Faisal	(Iraq) Al-Bahri	Free transfer	
4 November 2023	CB	(Iraq) Niaz Mohammed	Unattached	Termination of contract	
4 November 2023	AM	(Iraq) Yasser Naeem	Unattached	Termination of contract	
4 November 2023	LW	(Iraq) Ali Khalil	Unattached	Termination of contract	
4 November 2023	GK	(Iraq) Abed Saleem	Unattached	Termination of contract	
4 November 2023	CM	(Iraq) Mohammed Zamel	Unattached	Termination of contract	
4 November 2023	ST	(Iraq) Ahmed Lafta	Unattached	Termination of contract	
4 November 2023	SS	(Iraq) Hussam Malik	Unattached	Termination of contract	
4 November 2023	CB	(Iraq) Hussein Amer	Unattached	Termination of contract	
4 November 2023	LB	(Iraq) Hamza Adnan	Unattached	Termination of contract	
4 November 2023	ST	(Iraq) Murtaja Adel Nasser	Unattached	Termination of contract	
4 November 2023	RB	(Iraq) Salah Hassan	Unattached	Termination of contract	
4 November 2023	RB	(Iraq) Ibrahim Khalaf	Unattached	Termination of contract	
4 November 2023	RB	(Brazil) Jaílson	Unattached	Termination of contract	
4 November 2023	DM	(Ivory Coast) Didier Koré	Unattached	Termination of contract	
4 November 2023	ST	(Cameroon) Ernest Thierry Anang	Unattached	Termination of contract	
4 November 2023	DM	(Cameroon) Regis Baha	Unattached	Termination of contract	
4 November 2023	CB	(Niger) Abdoulaye Boureima Katkoré	Unattached	Termination of contract	
4 November 2023	CB	(Niger) Abdoulaye Karim Doudou	Unattached	Termination of contract	

=== Loans out ===
Date	No.	Pos.	Name	Loaned from	On loan until	Ref.
19 September 2023	29	RB	(Iraq) Karrar Al-Amir Ali	(Iraq) Al-Qasim	25 January 2024	

== Personnel ==
=== Technical staff ===
Position	Name
Manager	(Iraq) Hassan Ahmed
Assistant coach	(Iraq) Nasser Talla Dahilan (Iraq) Mahmoud Yasser
Goalkeeping Coach	(Iraq) Qusay Jabbar
Fitness coach	(Iraq) Ali Mohammed
Physiotherapist	(Iraq) Fares Abdullah
Team Supervisor	(Iraq) Abbas Hassan

== Kits ==
Supplier: Jako

Home	Away	Goalkeeper^{1}	Goalkeeper^{2}

== Stadium ==
The team was supposed to play at the Al-Minaa Olympic Stadium for the first time officially in the league, after its opening on December 26, 2022, as the team only played the opening friendly match at that time against Kuwait Club. But it was decided that the team would play its matches in Basra Sports City this season. But on January 8, 2024, the Minister of Youth and Sports, Ahmed Al-Mubarqaa, announced that Al-Minaa team will begin playing home matches on Al-Minaa Olympic Stadium starting from the fourteenth round of Iraq Stars League, which will be held after the international break.

== Pre-season and friendlies ==
=== Friendlies ===
Win Draw Loss Fixtures

29 September 2023	Al-Minaa	0–1	Al-Bahri	Basra
16:00 UTC+3		Report	Aziz	Stadium: Basra Sports City

3 October 2023	Al-Minaa	5–1	Abi Al-Khaseeb	Basra
16:00 UTC+3	Karim; Malik; Alaa; Farhan; Khudhair	Report	Goal	Stadium: Basra Sports City

9 October 2023	Al-Minaa	3–2	Al-Noor	Basra
16:00 UTC+3	Adel; Adnan; Khalaf		Goal	Stadium: Basra Sports City

12 October 2023	Al-Minaa	3–2	Al-Bahri	Basra
16:00 UTC+3	Mohsin; (.); Adel	Report	Goal	Stadium: Basra Sports City

16 October 2023	Al-Karkh	1–0	Al-Minaa	Baghdad
15:00 UTC+3	Ayadhiya 90'	Report		Stadium: Al-Saher Ahmed Radhi Stadium

19 October 2023	Amanat Baghdad	0–2	Al-Minaa	Baghdad
14:30 UTC+3		Report	Malik; Anang	Stadium: Al-Kahrabaa Stadium

16 January 2024	Al-Minaa	0–0	Naft Al-Basra	Basra
14:30 UTC+3				Stadium: Al-Fayhaa Stadium

18 January 2024	Al-Minaa	4–0	Al-Noor	Basra
14:30 UTC+3	Ahmed; Shokan; Khudhair			Stadium: Al-Fayhaa Stadium

29 January 2024	Al-Minaa	4–0	Al-Maqal	Basra
14:30 UTC+3	Ahmed; Hadi; Khudhair			Stadium: Al-Fayhaa Stadium

25 March 2024	Al-Minaa	0–1	Al-Sadeq	Basra
21:00 UTC+3		Report	Abed Ali	Stadium: Basra Sports City

== Competitions ==
=== Overview ===
Competition	First match	Last match	Starting round	Final position	Record							
Competition	First match	Last match	Starting round	Final position	Pld	W	D	L	GF	GA	GD	Win %
Iraq Stars League	27 October 2023	13 July 2024	Matchday 1	12th	38	10	12	16	38	59	−21	26.32
FA Cup	26 January 2024	9 April 2024	First round	Quarter-finals	4	3	0	1	7	3	+4	75.00
Total					42	13	12	17	45	62	−17	30.95

Source: Competitions

=== League table ===
Pos	Team	Pld	W	D	L	GF	GA	GD	Pts
10	Naft Maysan	38	10	17	11	41	40	+1	47
11	Al-Naft	38	10	16	12	37	44	−7	46
12	Al-Minaa	38	10	12	16	38	59	−21	42
13	Al-Kahrabaa	38	8	17	13	47	51	−4	41 (Note: Al-Kahrabaa finished ahead of Erbil on head-to-head goal difference: Erbil 1–0 Al-Kahrabaa, Al-Kahrabaa 3–1 Erbil.)
14	Erbil	38	9	14	15	46	50	−4	41

Source: IPFL
Rules for classification: 1) points; 2) head-to-head points; 3) head-to-head goal difference; 4) goal difference; 5) number of goals scored; 6) number of wins.

==== Summary table ====
Overall								Home						Away					
Pld	W	D	L	GF	GA	GD	Pts	W	D	L	GF	GA	GD	W	D	L	GF	GA	GD
38	10	12	16	38	59	−21	42	5	6	8	19	29	−10	5	6	8	19	30	−11

Source: Goalzz.com

==== Results by matchday ====
Matchday	1	2	3	4	5	6	7	8	9	10	11	12	13	14	15	16	17	18	19	20	21	22	23	24	25	26	27	28	29	30	31	32	33	34	35	36	37	38
Ground	H	A	H	A	H	A	H	A	H	A	H	A	A	H	H	A	H	A	H	A	H	A	H	H	A	A	H	A	H	H	A	A	H	A	H	A	H	A
Result	L	L	L	D	W	L	W	W	L	D	D	W	L	D	L	D	W	W	L	W	L	L	D	L	L	W	D	D	D	L	D	L	W	L	W	D	D	L
Position	18	20	20	20	19	19	15	10	14	12	13	12	12	15	15	14	12	11	13	13	13	13	13	13	13	12	12	13	12	13	13	13	13	13	12	12	12	12

Source: Goalzz.com
A = Away; H = Home; W = Win; D = Draw; L = Loss

==== Matches ====
The league fixtures were announced on 21 October 2023.

Win Draw Loss Fixtures

27 October 2023 1	Al-Minaa	1–3	Al-Kahrabaa	Basra
21:30 UTC+3	Khudhair (yellow card) 34'; Farhan (penalty missed) 66'; Alaa (yellow card) 79'; Odah 90'; Ahmed (yellow card) 90+3'	Report	Khalil 16'; Faisal 23'; Jamal (yellow card) 56'; Abdul-Amir (yellow card) 64'; Ngoba 90+1'	Stadium: Basra Sports City; Attendance: 15,000; Referee: Ahmed Kadhim

31 October 2023 2	Al-Karkh	4–1	Al-Minaa	Baghdad
15:00 UTC+3	Nouri (penalty missed) 6'; Abdul-Sada 40'; Boubacar 45+2'; Polegar 53', 75'; Zamel (yellow card) 90+3'	Report	Hameed 13'; Alaa (yellow card) 16'; Khudhair (yellow card) 45+1'; Ghaleb (yellow card) 77'	Stadium: Al-Saher Ahmed Radhi Stadium; Referee: Amjad Kamel

3 November 2023 3	Al-Minaa	0–3	Al-Shorta	Basra
21:30 UTC+3		Report	Ali 5'	Stadium: Basra Sports City; Referee: Mohammed Salah
Note: The match was awarded as a 3–0 win to Al-Shorta, as Al-Minaa started the game with only 7 players and had their player Mohammed Khudhair go off injured in the eighth minute while Al-Shorta were leading 1–0.

9 November 2023 4	Newroz	0–0	Al-Minaa	Sulaymaniyah
15:00 UTC+3	Delwar (yellow card) 61'	Report	Salem (yellow card) 16'; Ghaleb (yellow card) 52'; Mousa (yellow card) 69'; Ali (yellow card) 72'; Jaafar (yellow card) 80'	Stadium: Sulaymaniyah Stadium; Referee: Hamed Ali

23 November 2023 5	Al-Minaa	1–0	Al-Qasim	Basra
14:30 UTC+3	Salem 17', (yellow card) 37'; Shokan (yellow card) 45+2'	Report	Noor (yellow card) 38'; Hatam (yellow card) 45+2'; Karim (yellow card) 90+1'; Agyemang (yellow card) 90+7'	Stadium: Al-Fayhaa Stadium; Referee: Mohammed Sadeq

1 December 2023 6	Naft Maysan	3–0	Al-Minaa	Maysan
17:00 UTC+3	Al-Dali 45+5', 69', 90+11' (pen.); Al-Wasmani (yellow card) 87'; Saeed (yellow card) 90+16'	Report	Shenaishil (yellow card) 90+6'	Stadium: Maysan Olympic Stadium; Referee: Laith Farhan

6 December 2023 7	Al-Minaa	2–1	Al-Najaf	Basra
14:30 UTC+3	Jaafar (yellow card) 35', (goal) 43'; Alaa 45+3'; Shokan (red card) 59'; Khudhair (yellow card) 67'; Hameed (red card) 70'; Shenaishil (yellow card) 83'; Odah (yellow card) 90+6'	Report	Hamoud 4'; Hassan (yellow card) 64'; Samabaly (red card) 70'; Abdul-Rahim (yellow card) 90+4'	Stadium: Al-Fayhaa Stadium; Referee: Haider Adwan

9 December 2023 8	Al-Talaba	0–1	Al-Minaa	Baghdad
21:30 UTC+3	Ashour (red card) 38'; Tahseen (yellow card) 53'; Mohammed (yellow card) 64'; Ramadan (yellow card) 84'; Jawad (yellow card) 85'	Report	Shenaishil (yellow card) 40'; Ali (yellow card) 45+1'; Alaa 45+7'; Mousa (yellow card) 56'; Yas (yellow card) 70'; Khudhair (yellow card) 76'	Stadium: Al-Zawraa Stadium; Referee: Essam Fadhel

14 December 2023 9	Al-Minaa	0–3	Erbil	Basra
14:30 UTC+3	Hameed (yellow card) 74'; Jaafar (yellow card) 74'	Report	Radhi 3'; Hashim (red card) 8'; Faeq (yellow card) 43'; Makanzi (yellow card) 45+5'; Rostam 63', 69'; Shakhwan (yellow card) 90+9'	Stadium: Al-Fayhaa Stadium; Referee: Faid Karim

19 December 2023 10	Naft Al-Wasat	0–0	Al-Minaa	Najaf
17:00 UTC+3	Majed (yellow card) 9' (yellow-red card) 47'; Chaloub (yellow card) 65'	Report	Ali (yellow card) 22'; Hameed (yellow card) 90+3'	Stadium: Al-Najaf International Stadium; Referee: Sajjad Khalid
Note: Originally scheduled for 18 December 2023, this match was postponed due to the 2023 Iraqi governorate elections that held in same day.

22 December 2023 11	Al-Minaa	1–1	Naft Al-Basra	Basra
14:30 UTC+3	Shokan 59'; Farhan (yellow card) 70'; Ahmed (yellow card) 82'	Report	Romeu (yellow card) 24'; Joanderson (yellow card) 85'; Raad (yellow card) 86', (goal) 89'	Stadium: Al-Fayhaa Stadium; Referee: Zaid Thamir

29 December 2023 12	Karbalaa	1–2	Al-Minaa	Karbalaa
18:00 UTC+3	Awounyo (yellow card) 1'; Tariq 20'; Tchofo (yellow card) 64'	Report	Shokan 26' (pen.); Mousa 33', (yellow card) 71'; Salem (yellow card) 50'; Ghaleb (yellow card) 89'	Stadium: Karbala International Stadium; Referee: Mohanad Qasim

Mid-season break for 2023 AFC Asian Cup

10 February 2024 13	Al-Quwa Al-Jawiya	4–2	Al-Minaa	Baghdad
21:30 UTC+3	Jasim 11'; Hussein 38', 48', 90+5', (yellow card) 70'; Saadoun (yellow card) 72'	Report	Ahmed 28', 53'; Shokan (yellow card) 65'; Ghaleb (yellow card) 89'	Stadium: Al-Shaab Stadium; Referee: Mohammed Salman

16 February 2024 14	Al-Minaa	1–1	Al-Hudood	Basra
14:00 UTC+3	Ali (yellow card) 14'; Mousa (yellow card) 68'; Jaafar 90+6'	Report	Salem (yellow card) 20'; Dacosta 28'	Stadium: Al-Minaa Olympic Stadium; Referee: Hamed Ali

21 February 2024 15	Al-Minaa	0–2	Zakho	Basra
16:30 UTC+3	Hameed (yellow card) 31'; Jaafar (yellow card) 76'	Report	Seddiq (yellow card) 25'; Abogo 77', 90+7'; Manthour (yellow card) 87'	Stadium: Al-Minaa Olympic Stadium; Referee: Alaa Salam

24 February 2024 16	Al-Naft	1–1	Al-Minaa	Baghdad
14:00 UTC+3	Afolabi 11', (yellow card) 51'; Ghaleb (yellow card) 36'; Tariq (yellow card) 38'; Agbozo (yellow card) 43'	Report	Salem (yellow card) 10'; Alaa 19'; Hameed (yellow card) 56'; Odah (yellow card) 77'; Khudhair (red card) 85'	Stadium: Al-Saher Ahmed Radhi Stadium; Referee: Yousef Saeed

29 February 2024 17	Al-Minaa	2–0	Duhok	Basra
17:00 UTC+3	Ahmed 26'; Jaafar (yellow card) 45+9'; Alaa 73'	Report	Qasim (yellow card) 43'; Amin (yellow card) 89'	Stadium: Al-Minaa Olympic Stadium; Referee: Hamed Taleb

5 March 2024 18	Amanat Baghdad	0–1	Al-Minaa	Baghdad
14:30 UTC+3	Koré (yellow card) 21' (yellow-red card) 78'; Falah (yellow card) 45+1'; Abbas (yellow card) 68'; Fadhel (yellow card) 86'; Rezayej (red card) 90+4'	Report	Odah (yellow card) 41'; Abbas 89' (o.g.)	Stadium: Al-Madina Stadium; Referee: Mohammed Kamel

9 March 2024 19	Al-Minaa	1–3	Al-Zawraa	Basra
17:00 UTC+3	Ali (yellow card) 16'; Jaafar (yellow card) 61', (goal) 90+6'	Report	Al-Ani (yellow card) 20'; Sadeq 44'; Jalal 49'; Jabbar (yellow card) 58'; Abbas (yellow card) 62'; Mohammed 76'	Stadium: Al-Minaa Olympic Stadium; Referee: Ali Hussein Ali

1 April 2024 20	Naft Al-Basra	0–1	Al-Minaa	Basra
21:30 UTC+3	Malik (yellow card) 18'; Hadi (yellow card) 41'; Jadallah (yellow card) 58'	Report	Shokan 40' (pen.); Khudhair (yellow card) 45+4'; Salem (yellow card) 62'; Jaafar (yellow card) 87'; Yas (yellow card) 90+1'	Stadium: Al-Minaa Olympic Stadium; Referee: Mohanad Qasim

6 April 2024 21	Al-Minaa	1–3	Al-Karkh	Basra
21:30 UTC+3	Yas 28', (yellow card) 29'	Report	Khalid 4'; Hassan (yellow card) 58'; Abdul-Sada 74'; Obayes 90+3'	Stadium: Al-Minaa Olympic Stadium; Referee: Ahmed Kadhim

14 April 2024 22	Al-Shorta	2–0	Al-Mina'a	Baghdad
17:30 UTC+3	Abdul-Zahra (yellow card) 31'; Younis 76'; Esquerdinha 78'	Report	Farhan (yellow card) 1'; Ghaleb (yellow card) 39'; Salem (red card) 45+8'	Stadium: Al-Shaab Stadium; Referee: Yousef Saeed

21 April 2024 23	Al-Minaa	1–1	Karbalaa	Basra
15:45 UTC+3	Jaafar 71'	Report	Hien (yellow card) 9'; Hassan (yellow card) 10'; Ouattara (yellow card) 28'; Ayad 75'; Radhi (yellow card) 85'	Stadium: Al-Minaa Olympic Stadium; Referee: Amjad Kamel

24 April 2024 24	Al-Minaa	1–4	Newroz	Basra
18:00 UTC+3	Hassan (yellow card) 41' (yellow-red card); Alaa 86'	Report	Hussein 30' (pen.), 33', 63'; Delwar (yellow card) 67'; Hedayeb 76'	Stadium: Al-Minaa Olympic Stadium; Referee: Zaid Thamer

30 April 2024 25	Zakho	3–1	Al-Minaa	Duhok
18:00 UTC+3	Abogo 26'; Dione 37'; López 44'; Seddiq (yellow card) 52'; Mohammed (red card) 84'; Mansour (yellow card) 89'	Report	Farhan (yellow card) 30'; Jaafar 62'	Stadium: Zakho International Stadium; Referee: Mohanad Qasim

5 May 2024 26	Erbil	1–2	Al-Minaa	Erbil
18:00 UTC+3	Ali 43' (o.g.); Amir (yellow card) 45+5'; Ballo (yellow card) 49'; Nsayef (yellow card) 62'; Loqman (yellow card) 75'	Report	Farhan (yellow card) 36'; Jaafar 45+3'; Shokan 55'	Stadium: Franso Hariri Stadium; Referee: Wathiq Mohammed

9 May 2024 27	Al-Minaa	0–0	Al-Naft	Basra
20:15 UTC+3	Touré (yellow card) 90+1'	Report	Gbadebo (yellow card) 87'	Stadium: Al-Minaa Olympic Stadium; Referee: Ahmed Kadhim

12 May 2024 28	Al-Qasim	0–0	Al-Minaa	Karbala
20:30 UTC+3	Bagayoko (yellow card) 41'; Mohsin (red card) 90+5'	Report	Jebor (yellow card) 40'; Fofana (yellow card) 90+9'	Stadium: Karbala International Stadium; Referee: Mohammed Salman

18 May 2024 29	Al-Minaa	0–0	Al-Quwa Al-Jawiya	Basra
20:40 UTC+3	Jebor (yellow card) 39'; Ali (yellow card) 85'; Alaa (yellow card) 90+7'	Report	Bayesh (yellow card) 65'	Stadium: Al-Minaa Olympic Stadium; Referee: Mohanad Qasim

21 May 2024 30	Al-Minaa	0–2	Amanat Baghdad	Basra
16:05 UTC+3	Mousa (yellow card) 45'	Report	Koré 25'; Falah (yellow card) 40'; Ziyad 53', (yellow card) 59'; Bari (penalty missed) 65'; Ali (yellow card) 79'	Stadium: Al-Minaa Olympic Stadium; Referee: Wathiq Mohammed

25 May 2024 31	Al-Kahrabaa	2–2	Al-Minaa	Baghdad
18:00 UTC+3	Mumuni 13', 47'; Khalid (yellow card) 39'; Abdul Amir (yellow card) 45+5'; Tetteh (yellow card) 90+6'; Aminu (yellow card) 90+14' (yellow-red card)	Report	Olatunji (yellow card) 5'; Jebor (yellow card) 22', (goal) 41' (pen.); Alaa 90+11'	Stadium: Al-Zawraa Stadium; Referee: Sajjad Khalid

31 May 2024 32	Al-Zawraa	1–0	Al-Minaa	Baghdad
20:45 UTC+3	Falah (yellow card) 19'; John 82'; Ridha (yellow card) 90+1'	Report	Al-Amir Ali (yellow card) 57'; Hameed (yellow card) 89'; Ali (red card) 90+9'	Stadium: Al-Zawraa Stadium; Referee: Alaa Salam

18 June 2024 33	Al-Minaa	4–2	Naft Al-Wasat	Basra
19:40 UTC+3	Jebor 22', 45', 56', 80'; Olatunji (yellow card) 35'; Jaafar (yellow card) 47'; Touré (yellow card) 67'	Report	Dalli (yellow card) 67'; Razzaq (yellow card) 69'; Adel 84', 88'	Stadium: Al-Fayhaa Stadium; Referee: Laith Farhan

22 June 2024 34	Al-Hudood	2–1	Al-Minaa	Baghdad
17:00 UTC+3	Ghazi 9', 81' (pen.), (yellow card) 58'; Mohammed (yellow card) 90+11'	Report	Jebor 73'; Jaafar (yellow card) 80'; Ali (yellow card) 84'	Stadium: Al-Saher Ahmed Radhi Stadium; Referee: Salem Amer

27 June 2024 35	Al-Minaa	3–0	Naft Maysan	Basra
19:37 UTC+3	Fofana (yellow card) 26'; Jaafar 43'; Jebor 61'; Alaa 85'; Yas (yellow card) 82'	Report	Amer (yellow card) 52'; Nasser (yellow card) 54'; Hussein (yellow card) 63'	Stadium: Al-Fayhaa Stadium; Referee: Hamed Ali

1 July 2024 36	Duhok	4–4	Al-Minaa	Duhok
19:15 UTC+3	Saeed (yellow card) 18'; Zakri 26'; H.Ahmed 32', 90+4'; Louati (yellow card) 50'; Lucas (yellow card) 55'; Hzair 67'; Saleh (yellow card) 89'	Report	Farhan 1'; Alaa 47'; S.Ahmed 62', (yellow card) 63' (yellow-red card); Fofana (yellow card) 71'; Jaafar 90+3' (pen.)	Stadium: Duhok Stadium; Referee: Faid Karim

5 July 2024 37	Al-Minaa	0–0	Al-Talaba	Basra
19:30 UTC+3	Olatunji (yellow card) 35'; Alaa (yellow card) 49'	Report		Stadium: Al-Fayhaa Stadium; Referee: Mohammed Salah

13 July 2024 38	Al-Najaf	2–0	Al-Minaa	Najaf
	Dawood (penalty missed) 58', 71'; Mestouri 58'; Ghariani (yellow card) 61'; Mendy (yellow card) 90+4'	Report		Stadium: Al-Najaf International Stadium; Referee: Mohanad Manaf

=== FA Cup ===
26 January 2024 First round	Al-Minaa	3–0 (w/o)	Al-Diwaniya	Basra
14:30 UTC+3		Report		Stadium: Al-Minaa Olympic Stadium
Note: The match was awarded as a 3–0 win to Al-Minaa, as Al-Diwaniya did not turn up for the game.

3 February 2024 ٍSecond round	Al-Minaa	3–1	Naft Al-Wasat	Basra
14:30 UTC+3	Farhan 22'; Ahmed 49'; Hameed 65'	Report	70'	Stadium: Al-Minaa Olympic Stadium

14 March 2024 Round of 16	Al-Minaa	1–0	Al-Hudood	Basra
21:30 UTC+3	Ahmed 23'	Report		Stadium: Al-Minaa Olympic Stadium; Attendance: 19,650; Referee: Wathiq Mohammed

9 April 2024 Quarter-finals	Al-Minaa	0–2	Al-Shorta	Basra
21:30 UTC+3	Jaafar (yellow card) 90+4' (yellow-red card)	Report	Ali 12'; Younis (red card) 14'; Jassim 89' (pen.)	Stadium: Al-Minaa Olympic Stadium; Referee: Mohammed Tariq

== Statistics ==
=== Appearances ===
Twenty eight players made their appearances for Al-Minaa's first team during the season.

Includes all competitions for senior teams.

2023–24 season
No.	Pos.	Player	IS League	FA Cup	total
1	GK	(Iraq) Mohammed Saadoun	0+1	0	0+1
2	DF	(Iraq) Abdullah Mohsin	16+3	2	18+3
4	DF	(Iraq) Emad Yousef	0+1	0	0+1
5	MF	(Iraq) Ahmed Mohsin Ashour	0+4	0	0+4
6	MF	(Iraq) Haider Salem	25+5	3	28+5
7	MF	(Iraq) Ayad Abed Farhan	22+11	3	25+11
9	FW	(Liberia) William Jebor	14	0	14
10	FW	(Iraq) Mohammed Shokan	14+13	2	16+13
11	MF	(Iraq) Hatim Aysar	0+5	0+1	0+6
12	FW	(Iraq) Karrar Jaafar	31+4	1	32+4
14	DF	(Ivory Coast) Habib Omar Fofana	14	0	14
15	MF	(Iraq) Mohammed Khudhair	21+10	3	24+10
16	MF	(Ivory Coast) Yusuf Touré	14	0	14
17	DF	(Iraq) Muntadhar Hassan	4+2	0	4+2
18	FW	(Iraq) Salem Ahmed	25+4	3	28+4
19	DF	(Iraq) Hassan Odah	7+10	0	7+10
22	GK	(Iraq) Jaafar Shenaishil	35	2	37
26	FW	(Iraq) Sajjad Alaa	19+18	2+1	21+19
27	MF	(Nigeria) Dare Olatunji	14	0	14
28	MF	(Iraq) Hamza Hadi Ahmed	1+7	0+1	1+8
29	DF	(Iraq) Karrar Al-Amir Ali	9+5	1	10+5
33	MF	(Iraq) Abbas Yas	29+5	3	32+5
35	DF	(Iraq) Mujtaba Ali	24+6	3	27+6
36	DF	(Iraq) Hameed Ali Hameed	22+13	1+1	23+14
39	MF	(Iraq) Naji Nasser	0+3	0+1	0+4
40	DF	(Iraq) Mohammed Ghaleb	23+1	1	24+1
42	DF	(Iraq) Muslim Mousa	27+4	2+1	29+5
50	GK	(Iraq) Mohammed Sabah	3+1	1	4+1

=== Goalscorers ===
The following eleven players scored for Al-Minaa's first team during the season.

Includes all competitions for senior teams. The list is sorted by squad number when season-total goals are equal. Players with no goals not included in the list.

2023–24 season
Rank	No.	Pos	Nat	Name	IS League	FA Cup	Total
1	12	MF	(Iraq)	Karrar Jaafar	8	0	8
1	26	MF	(Iraq)	Sajjad Alaa	8	0	8
2	9	FW	(Liberia)	William Jebor	7	0	7
3	18	FW	(Iraq)	Salem Ahmed	4	2	6
4	10	FW	(Iraq)	Mohammed Shokan	4	0	4
5	7	MF	(Iraq)	Ayad Abed Farhan	1	1	2
5	36	DF	(Iraq)	Hameed Ali Hameed	1	1	2
6	6	MF	(Iraq)	Haider Salem	1	0	1
6	19	DF	(Iraq)	Hassan Odah	1	0	1
6	33	MF	(Iraq)	Abbas Yas	1	0	1
6	42	DF	(Iraq)	Muslim Mousa	1	0	1
Own goals					1	0	1
TOTALS					38	4	42

==== Hat-tricks ====
Includes all competitions for senior teams. Players with no hat-tricks not included in the list.

Keys

- Score – The score at the time of each goal. Al-Minaa's score listed first.
- Final score – The score at full time; Al-Minaa's listed first.

Date	No.	Pos.	Player	Score	Final score	Opponent	Competition	Ref.
18 June 2024	9	FW	(Liberia) William Jebor	1–0, 2–0, 3–0, 4–0 (H)	4–2 (H)	Naft Al-Wasat	Iraq Stars League	

=== Assists ===
The following eleven players registered their assists for Al-Minaa's first team during the season.

Includes all competitions for senior teams. The list is sorted by squad number when season-total assists are equal. Players with no assists not included in the list.

2023–24 season
Rank	No.	Pos	Nat	Name	IS League	FA Cup	Total
1	12	MF	(Iraq)	Karrar Jaafar	6	0	6
2	7	MF	(Iraq)	Ayad Abed Farhan	4	1	5
2	10	FW	(Iraq)	Mohammed Shokan	5	0	5
3	18	FW	(Iraq)	Salem Ahmed	4	0	4
4	15	MF	(Iraq)	Mohammed Khudhair	3	0	3
5	9	FW	(Liberia)	William Jebor	2	0	2
5	36	DF	(Iraq)	Hameed Ali Hameed	2	0	2
6	27	MF	(Nigeria)	Dare Olatunji	1	0	1
6	29	DF	(Iraq)	Karrar Al-Amir Ali	1	0	1
6	35	DF	(Iraq)	Mujtaba Ali	1	0	1
6	42	DF	(Iraq)	Muslim Mousa	1	0	1
TOTALS					30	1	31

=== Disciplinary record ===
Includes all competitions for senior teams. The list is sorted by red cards, then yellow cards (and by squad number when total cards are equal). Players with no cards not included in the list.

Rk.	No.	Pos.	Player	IS League			FA Cup			Total		
Rk.	No.	Pos.	Player	Yellow card	Second yellow card	Red card	Yellow card	Second yellow card	Red card	Yellow card	Second yellow card	Red card
1	35	MF	(Iraq) Mujtaba Ali	7	0	1	0	0	0	7	0	1
2	6	MF	(Iraq) Haider Salem	5	0	1	0	0	0	5	0	1
2	15	MF	(Iraq) Mohammed Khudhair	5	0	1	0	0	0	5	0	1
2	36	DF	(Iraq) Hameed Ali Hameed	5	0	1	0	0	0	5	0	1
3	10	FW	(Iraq) Mohammed Shokan	2	0	1	0	0	0	2	0	1
4	12	MF	(Iraq) Karrar Jaafar	9	0	0	0	1	0	9	1	0
5	18	FW	(Iraq) Salem Ahmed	2	1	0	0	0	0	2	1	0
6	17	DF	(Iraq) Muntadhar Hassan	0	1	0	0	0	0	0	1	0
7	40	DF	(Iraq) Mohammed Ghaleb	5	0	0	0	0	0	5	0	0
7	42	DF	(Iraq) Muslim Mousa	5	0	0	0	0	0	5	0	0
8	7	MF	(Iraq) Ayad Abed Farhan	4	0	0	0	0	0	4	0	0
8	26	MF	(Iraq) Sajjad Alaa	4	0	0	0	0	0	4	0	0
8	33	DF	(Iraq) Abbas Yas	4	0	0	0	0	0	4	0	0
9	9	FW	(Liberia) William Jebor	3	0	0	0	0	0	3	0	0
9	14	DF	(Ivory Coast) Habib Omar Fofana	3	0	0	0	0	0	3	0	0
9	19	DF	(Iraq) Hassan Odah	3	0	0	0	0	0	3	0	0
9	22	GK	(Iraq) Jaafar Shenaishil	3	0	0	0	0	0	3	0	0
9	27	MF	(Nigeria) Dare Olatunji	3	0	0	0	0	0	3	0	0
10	16	MF	(Ivory Coast) Yusuf Touré	2	0	0	0	0	0	2	0	0
11	29	DF	(Iraq) Karrar Al-Amir Ali	1	0	0	0	0	0	1	0	0
Total				73	2	5	0	1	0	73	3	5

=== Clean sheets ===
Goalkeepers with no clean sheets not included in the list.

Rank	Nat	No.	Name	IS League	FA Cup	Total
1	(Iraq)	22	Jaafar Shenaishil	12	1	13
TOTALS				12	1	13

=== Captains ===
Includes all competitions for senior teams. The list is sorted by squad number when season-total number of games where a player started as captain are equal. Players with no games started as captain not included in the list.

2023–24 season
Rk.	No.	Pos.	Player	IS League	FA Cup	Total
1	2	DF	(Iraq) Abdullah Mohsin	16	2	18
2	33	DF	(Iraq) Abbas Yas	12	0	12
3	10	FW	(Iraq) Mohammed Shokan	6	1	7
4	6	MF	(Iraq) Haider Salem	2	0	2
5	9	FW	(Liberia) William Jebor	1	0	1
5	18	FW	(Iraq) Salem Ahmed	1	0	1
TOTALS				37	3	40

=== International call-ups ===
The following eight Al-Minaa players (excluding players who departed the club permanently or on loan) were named in their respective countries' senior squads for international fixtures during the season.

The list is sorted by national team and player, respectively. Players with no senior national team call-ups not included in the list.

National team	Player	Pos.	Debut	Caps	Goals	Latest call-up
Iraq-U23	Salem Ahmed	FW	2024	5	0	April 2024
Iraq-U23	Jaafar Shenaishil	GK	2023	5	0	March 2024
Iraq-U23	Mujtaba Ali	DF	2024	2	0	March 2024
Iraq-U23	Sajjad Alaa	FW	2023	5	0	March 2024
Iraq-U20	Mohammed Ghaleb	DF	2023	11	0	June 2024
Iraq-U20	Muslim Mousa	DF	2022	24	0	June 2024
Iraq-U20	Karrar Jaafar	FW	2023	8	3	March 2024
Iraq-U17	Ammar Ali	GK	2023	4	0	December 2023

== Awards ==
=== Iraq Stars League Manager of the Round ===
The winner of the award was chosen by a panel of experts.

Round	Manager	P Pos.	C Pos.	Opponent	O Pos.	Result	Ref.
7th	(Iraq) Hassan Ahmed	19	15	Al-Najaf	18	2–1 (H)	
17th	(Iraq) Hassan Ahmed	14	12	Duhok	3	2–0 (H)	
35th	(Iraq) Hassan Ahmed	13	12	Naft Maysan	11	3–0 (H)	

=== Iraq Stars League Player of the Round ===
The winner of the Iraq Stars League Player of the Round was chosen by a panel of experts

Round	Pos.	Player	G	A	Opponent	Result	Ref.
33th	FW	(Liberia) William Jebor	4	0	Naft Al-Wasat	4–2 (H)	

=== Iraq Stars League Goalkeeper of the Round ===
The winner of the Iraq Stars League Goalkeeper of the Round was chosen by a panel of experts

Round	Player	CS	S	Opponent	Result	Ref.
12th	(Iraq) Jaafar Shenaishil	0	?	Karbalaa	2–1 (A)	
37th	(Iraq) Jaafar Shenaishil	1	7	Al-Talaba	0–0 (H)	
