= 2022–23 Al-Mina'a SC season =

Al-Mina'a SC
2022–23 season
- Chairman: Adel Nasser (until 26 Jan.); Farhan Al-Farttousi (from 26 Jan.)
- Manager: Basim Qasim (until 20 May); Fareed Majeed (from 20 May)
- Ground: Al-Minaa Olympic Stadium
- First Division League: 1st (promoted)
- FA Cup: Third round
- Top goalscorer: League: Salem Ahmed (11); All: Salem Ahmed (12)
- Biggest win: 5–0 vs Al-Sulaikh (H) (27 April 2023)
- Biggest defeat: 0–3 vs Diyala (A) (19 November 2022)
Home colours	Away colours

The 2022–23 season will be Al-Minaa's first season in the Iraqi First Division League since the 1989–90 season and their third overall, having been relegated from the Iraqi Premier League in the 2021–22 season. Al-Minaa are participating in the Iraqi First Division League and the Iraq FA Cup.

== Review ==
After the end of the 2021–22 season, the Football Association did not specify the mechanism for the participation of clubs and their number in the subsequent season, and the matter remained ambiguous. Orally and in the media, the Football Association decided that the system of playing in the league will be according to the professional league system, and any club that did not complete its file according to the Club Licensing Law will not participate. The president of Football Association, Adnan Dirjal promised the president of Al-Minaa club and the governor of Basra that the Al-Minaa team would play in the Iraqi Premier League and not in the Iraqi First Division League if the club completed the licensing file. Based on the foregoing, the club contracted with coach Basim Qasim and five professionals, paid all their debts and completed the licensing file. But the club was surprised by the decision of the Football Association to reverse its decision to play according to the professional league system and not to accredit the licensed clubs, and that they were deceived by the Football Association.

The club's administrative problems and the unfair decision of the Football Association directly affected the bad start of the Al-Minaa matches, as it exited early from the FA Cup, and it also lost its first match in the First Division League by a difference of 3 goals.

However, the team gradually improved, and in the last rounds of the league, it topped Group 2, finished its matches at the top with 46 points, and was promoted to the Premier League and return after only one season, and it was decided that the team would play the final match in Baghdad on May 26, 2023 against Amanat Baghdad to determine the league champion. The Al-Minaa administration demanded that the match be transferred to Basra due to the large number of fans of the Al-Minaa, so that the match would be more attended, and the Amanat Baghdad administration agreed to that. Later, the Football Association decided that the match would be held on 2 June in Al-Fayhaa Stadium.

In the final, Al-Minaa was able to defeat Amanat Baghdad, 2–1, and win the title. The goals of Al-Minaa were scored by Sajjad Alaa (6') and Salem Ahmed (37'), while the goal of Amanat Baghdad was scored by Karrar Ali Bari (53').

== Squad ==
Note: Flags indicate national team as defined under FIFA eligibility rules; some limited exceptions apply. Players may hold more than one non-FIFA nationality.

No.	Pos.	Nation	Player
1	GK	IRQ	Jaafar Shenaishil
4	DF	MAR	Abdelhakim Aklidou
7	MF	IRQ	Ayad Abed Farhan
12	FW	IRQ	Karrar Jaafar
14	FW	IRQ	Asahr Ali
15	MF	IRQ	Mohammed Khudhair
16	MF	IRQ	Ahmed Mohsin Ashour
17	DF	IRQ	Haider Sari
18	FW	IRQ	Salem Ahmed
19	DF	IRQ	Muslim Mousa
22	GK	IRQ	Ali Faisal
23	DF	IRQ	Hussein Jabbar
26	FW	IRQ	Sajjad Alaa
28	MF	IRQ	Hamza Hadi Ahmed
29	DF	IRQ	Karrar Al-Amir Ali
30	DF	IRQ	Karrar Jumaa

No.	Pos.	Nation	Player
32	FW	IRQ	Abdullah Abdul Wahed
33	MF	IRQ	Abbas Yas
34	DF	BFA	Mohamed Ouattara
36	DF	IRQ	Hassan Odah
37	MF	IRQ	Haider Salem
38	MF	IRQ	Daniel Waleed
39	MF	BRA	Dioguinho
40	GK	IRQ	Mohammed Sabah
42	DF	IRQ	Abdullah Mohsin
44	MF	MAR	Soufiane Talal
47	MF	IRQ	Mohammed Salah
48	MF	IRQ	Hussein Abdul Karim
50	GK	IRQ	Haider Shejaa
55	DF	IRQ	Mohammed Abdul-Zahra
—	FW	FRA	Ghislain Guessan

== New contracts and transfers ==
=== New contracts ===
Date	No.	Pos.	Name	Ref.
6 September 2022	11	AM	(Iraq) Abdullah Wasfi	
6 September 2022	16	AM	(Iraq) Ahmed Mohsin Ashour	
6 September 2022	18	ST	(Iraq) Salem Ahmed	
6 September 2022	22	GK	(Iraq) Ali Faisal	
6 September 2022	25	DM	(Iraq) Sajid Abbas Hashim	
9 September 2022	28	CM	(Iraq) Hamza Hadi Ahmed	
9 September 2022	33	DM	(Iraq) Abbas Yas	
9 September 2022	36	LB	(Iraq) Hassan Odah	

=== Transfers in ===
Date	Pos.	Name	From	Fee	Ref.
22 August 2022	CB	(Iraq) Karrar Mohammed	(Iraq) Al-Naft	Free transfer	
22 August 2022	GK	(Iraq) Amjad Rahim	(Iraq) Al-Najaf	Free transfer	
23 August 2022	LB	(Iraq) Haidar Sari	(Iraq) Naft Al-Basra	Free transfer	
30 August 2022	CB	(Croatia) Sebastijan Antić	(Libya) Alittihad Misurata	Free transfer	
2 September 2022	RW	(Curaçao) Elson Hooi	(Kuwait) Al Tadhamon	Free transfer	
9 September 2022	RB	(Iraq) Hussein Jabbar	Al-Minaa Academy	n/a	
9 September 2022	ST	(Iraq) Sajjad Alaa	Al-Minaa Academy	n/a	
13 September 2022	GK	(Iraq) Jaafar Shenaishil	Al-Minaa Academy	n/a	
13 September 2022	CM	(Iraq) Mohammed Khudhair	Al-Minaa Academy	n/a	
15 September 2022	CB	(Panama) Roderick Miller	(Iraq) Al-Quwa Al-Jawiya	Free transfer	
15 September 2022	CB	(Morocco) Abdelhakim Aklidou	(Morocco) Ittihad Tanger	Free transfer	
15 September 2022	ST	(Guinea) Mamadouba Bangoura	(Tunisia) CS Hammam-Lif	Free transfer	
16 September 2022	CB	(Iraq) Karrar Jumaa	(Iraq) Naft Al-Basra	Free transfer	
16 September 2022	DM	(Iraq) Mohammed Abdul Zahra	(Iraq) Masafi Al-Janoob	Free transfer	
29 September 2022	AM	(Iraq) Ayad Abed Farhan	(Iraq) Zakho	Free transfer	
23 October 2022	LB	(Iraq) Muslim Mousa	Al-Minaa Academy	n/a	
23 October 2022	LW	(Iraq) Karrar Jaafar	Al-Minaa Academy	n/a	
23 October 2022	LW	(Iraq) Daniel Waleed	Al-Minaa Academy	n/a	
1 November 2022	CM	(Iraq) Mohammed Abdul Hussein	(Iraq) Al-Karkh	Free transfer	
4 January 2023	CB	(Iraq) Abdullah Mohsin	(Iraq) Naft Al-Basra	Free transfer	
4 January 2023	DM	(Iraq) Haidar Salem	(Iraq) Naft Al-Basra	Free transfer	
23 January 2023	CB	(Burkina Faso) Mohamed Ouattara	(Iraq) Al-Naft	Free transfer	
28 January 2023	AM	(Brazil) Dioguinho	(Brazil) Paysandu	Free transfer	
30 January 2023	AM	(Morocco) Soufiane Talal	(Iraq) Al-Zawraa	Free transfer	
30 January 2023	GK	(Iraq) Mohammed Sabah	(Iraq) Al-Nasiriya	Free transfer	
2 February 2023	GK	(Iraq) Haider Shejaa	(Iraq) Al-Naft	Loan	
2 February 2023	ST	(Iraq) Abdullah Abdul Wahed	(Iraq) Al-Karkh	Free transfer	
5 February 2023	DM	(Iraq) Hussein Abdul Karim	(Iraq) Al-Qasim	Free transfer	
5 February 2023	RW	(Iraq) Mohammed Salah	(Iraq) Naft Al-Basra	Free transfer	
6 February 2023	CB	(Iraq) Mohammed Abdul-Zahra	(Iraq) Al-Najaf	Free transfer	
6 February 2023	ST	(France) Ghislain Guessan	(Malaysia) Perak	Free transfer	

=== Transfers out ===
Date	Pos.	Name	To	Fee	Ref.
11 July 2022	CM	(Yemen) Nasser Al-Gahwashi	(Iraq) Naft Al-Wasat	Undisclosed	
19 July 2022	AM	(Jordan) Mehdi Alamah	(Jordan) Al-Jazeera	Free transfer	
20 July 2022	LB	(Iraq) Ahmed Yahya	(Iraq) Al-Shorta	Undisclosed	
19 August 2022	CB	(Tunisia) Afif Jebali	(Libya) Asaria FC	Free transfer	
20 August 2022	RB	(Iraq) Ahmed Mohammed	Unattached	Released	
20 August 2022	RW	(Iraq) Ahmed Jalil Hanoon	Unattached	Released	
20 August 2022	AM	(Iraq) Murtadha Shaker	Unattached	Released	
22 August 2022	CB	(Algeria) Bilal Tizi Bouali	(Algeria) JS Bordj Ménaïel	Free transfer	
26 August 2022	DM	(Niger) Ousmane Diabaté	(Libya) Olympic Azzaweya	Free transfer	
27 August 2022	GK	(Iraq) Ali Abdul Hassan	(Iraq) Al-Kahrabaa	Free transfer	
3 September 2022	CB	(Iraq) Ali Lateef	(Iraq) Al-Ramadi	Free transfer	
6 September 2022	ST	(Iraq) Manar Taha	(Iraq) Zakho	Free transfer	
11 September 2022	DM	(Iraq) Ibrahim Naeem	(Iraq) Al-Sinaa	Free transfer	
23 September 2022	GK	(Iraq) Murtadha Sami	(Iraq) Masafi Al-Janoob	Free transfer	
6 November 2022	ST	(Iraq) Mohammed Shokan	Unattached	Released	
24 November 2022	CB	(Croatia) Sebastijan Antić	Unattached	Released	
2 December 2022	CB	(Panama) Roderick Miller	Unattached	Released	
4 December 2022	ST	(Guinea) Mamadouba Bangoura	Unattached	Released	
25 December 2022	GK	(Iraq) Amjad Rahim	Unattached	Released	
6 January 2023	RW	(Curaçao) Elson Hooi	Unattached	Released	
24 January 2023	CB	(Iraq) Ahmed Khalid	(Iraq) Newroz	Free transfer	
25 January 2023	AM	(Iraq) Ali Shawqi	(Iraq) Al-Qasim	Free transfer	
3 February 2023	CB	(Iraq) Karrar Mohammed	(Iraq) Naft Al-Wasat	Released	
4 February 2023	AM	(Iraq) Abdullah Wasfi	(Iraq) Newroz	Released	
6 February 2023	DM	(Iraq) Sajid Abbas Hashim	Unattached	Released	
6 February 2023	DM	(Iraq) Mohammed Abdul Zahra	Unattached	Released	
6 February 2023	CM	(Iraq) Mohammed Abdul Hussein	Unattached	Released	
9 February 2023	GK	(Iraq) Mujtaba Mohammed	(Iraq) Al-Diwaniya	Released	

== Personnel ==
=== Technical staff ===
Management and staff as of 20 May 2023
Position	Name
Manager	(Iraq) Fareed Majeed
Goalkeeping coach	(Iraq) Qusay Jabbar
Fitness coach	(Iraq) Nassir Abdul-Amir
Team doctor	(Iraq) Fares Abdullah
Team supervisor	(Iraq) Ali Fadhel

== Stadium ==
On December 26, 2022, the Al-Minaa Olympic Stadium was inaugurated by the Ministry of Youth and Sports in preparation for the establishment of the 25th Arabian Gulf Cup, where the tournament will take place on this stadium in addition to the Basra Sports City. The opening included a ceremony in which the retired Al-Minaa stars were honored. After that, a friendly match took place between Al-Minaa and Kuwait, in which Kuwait won 2–1. Ali Hussain (57') and Taha Yassine Khenissi (66') scored the double for Kuwait, and Karrar Mohammed scored for Al-Minaa from a penalty kick in the 89th minute. Despite the completion of the construction of the stadium, the stadium was not handed over to the club to play its matches on it, due to some side deficiencies in it. Therefore, Basra Sports City will remain the temporary stadium for the team this season.

== Pre-season and friendlies ==
Date	Opponents	H / A	Result F–A	Scorers
16 September 2022	Al-Zubair	H	2–0	Ahmed, Hooi
18 September 2022	Erbil	A	0–1	
20 September 2022	Newroz	A	1–1	Ashour
22 September 2022	Al-Quwa Al-Jawiya	N	1–2	Hooi
29 September 2022	Naft Maysan	H	1–0	Ahmed
2 October 2022	Masafi Al-Janoob	H	2–1	Shokan, Wasfi
10 October 2022	Naft Al-Basra	H	2–3	Farhan, Al-Amir Ali
12 October 2022	Al-Zubair	H	4–0	Shokan, Wasfi, Alaa, Abbas
16 October 2022	Al-Zawraa	A	0–1	
18 October 2022	Al-Sinaat Al-Kahrabaiya	A	1–0	Ahmed
19 October 2022	Al-Jolan	N	1–1	Hadi
21 October 2022	Al-Etisalat	A	1–1	Wasfi
27 October 2022	Masafi Al-Janoob	H	2–0	Ahmed, Jaafar
2 November 2022	Safwan	H	2–0	Bangoura, Aysar
27 October 2022	Masafi Al-Janoob	H	2–0	Ahmed, Jaafar
26 December 2022	Kuwait	H	1–2	K.Mohammed 90' (pen.)
20 January 2023	Al-Bahri	H	0–1	
22 March 2023	Al-Bahri	A	0–0	

== Competitions ==
=== Overview ===
Competition	First match	Last match	Starting round	Final position	Record							
Competition	First match	Last match	Starting round	Final position	Pld	W	D	L	GF	GA	GD	Win %
First Division League	18 November 2022	2 June 2023	Matchday 1	Winners	23	14	7	2	40	16	+24	60.87
FA Cup	1 November 2022	12 November 2022	First round	Third round	2	1	0	1	4	2	+2	50.00
Total					25	15	7	3	44	18	+26	60.00

Last updated: 2 June 2023
Source: Competitions

=== First Division League ===
==== Summary table ====
Overall								Home						Away					
Pld	W	D	L	GF	GA	GD	Pts	W	D	L	GF	GA	GD	W	D	L	GF	GA	GD
23	14	7	2	40	16	+24	49	9	2	1	25	9	+16	5	5	1	15	7	+8

Last updated: 2 June 2023.
Source: Goalzz.com

==== Matches ====
Date	Opponents	H / A	Result F–A	Scorers	pos.
19 November 2022	Diyala	A	0–3		12th
24 November 2022	Al-Muroor	H	3–2	Ahmed 42', Wasfi 73', Khalid 87'	7th
29 November 2022	Al-Nasiriya	A	1–1	Ahmed 79'	8th
4 December 2022	Al-Jolan	H	1–0	Jaafar 87'	4th
9 December 2022	Al-Hussein	H	1–0	Jaafar 89'	2nd
14 December 2022	Al-Samawa	A	2–0	Alaa 38', Ahmed 90+1'	2nd
19 December 2022	Al-Kufa	H	0–0		3rd
Mid-season break for 25th Arabian Gulf Cup
28 January 2023	Afak	H	1–1	Jaafar 63'	3rd
2 February 2023	Al-Sulaikh	A	2–1	Aklidou 70' (pen.), Farhan 80'	3rd
7 February 2023	Masafi Al-Wasat	H	1–0	Dioguinho 58'	2nd
13 February 2023 (Note: This match, which was originally scheduled to take place on December 24, 2022, was postponed due to Al-Minaa’s association with the opening match of Al-Minaa Olympic Stadium against Kuwait on the 26th of the same month.)	Al-Shirqat	A	2–0	Alaa 46', Farhan 85' (pen.)	1st
20 February 2023	Diyala	H	1–2	Farhan 38'	2nd
25 February 2024	Al-Muroor	A	1–1	Alaa 61'	2nd
2 March 2023	Al-Nasiriya	H	3–0	Farhan 45' (pen.), Ahmed 56', Dioguinho 78'	2nd
12 March 2024	Al-Jolan	A	0–0		2nd
25 March 2023 (Note: This match, which was scheduled to take place on March 17, 2023, was postponed to the next day, and then postponed to March 25, 2023 due to the pitch floor was not eligible after rain.)	Al-Hussein	A	0–0		1st
31 March 2023	Al-Samawa	H	2–1	Jaafar 26', Ahmed 83'	1st
5 April 2023	Al-Kufa	A	1–1	Dioguinho 8'	1st
10 April 2023	Al-Shirqat	H	5–2	Jaafar 28', Farhan 41' (pen.), Ahmed (2) 50', 88', Dioguinho 83'	1st
21 April 2023	Afak	A	3–0	Ahmed 49', Ouattara 60', Dioguinho 90'	1st
27 April 2023	Al-Sulaikh	H	5–0	Ahmed (2) 32', 38', Alaa (2) 57', 60', Dioguinho 62'	1st
2 May 2023	Masafi Al-Wasat	A	3–0	Salem 22', Ouattara 28', Dioguinho 40'	1st
2 June 2023	Amanat Baghdad	H	2–1	Alaa 6', Ahmed 37'	1st

=== FA Cup ===
Date	Round	Opponents	H / A	Result F–A	Scorers
1 November 2022	First round	Al-Shabab Al-Basri	H	3–0	Ahmed 16', Khalid 62', Wasfi 90+2'
12 November 2022	Third round	Masafi Al-Junoob	A	1–2	Hooi 77' (pen.)

== Squad statistics ==
=== Goalscorers ===
Rank	No.	Pos	Nat	Name	First Division League	FA Cup	Total
1	18	FW	(Iraq)	Salem Ahmed	11	1	12
2	39	FW	(Brazil)	Dioguinho	7	0	7
3	26	FW	(Iraq)	Sajjad Alaa	6	0	6
4	7	MF	(Iraq)	Ayad Abed Farhan	5	0	5
4	12	FW	(Iraq)	Karrar Jaafar	5	0	5
6	11	MF	(Iraq)	Abdullah Wasfi	1	1	2
6	34	DF	(Burkina Faso)	Mohamed Ouattara	2	0	2
6	35	DF	(Iraq)	Ahmed Khalid	1	1	2
9	4	DF	(Morocco)	Abdelhakim Aklidou	1	0	1
9	9	MF	(Curaçao)	Elson Hooi	0	1	1
9	37	MF	(Iraq)	Haider Salem	1	0	1
Own goals					0	0	0
TOTALS					40	4	44

Last updated: 2 June 2023

=== Clean sheets ===
Rank	Nationality	Number	Name	First Division League	FA Cup	Total
1	(Iraq)	22	Ali Faisal	8	0	8
2	(Iraq)	21	Amjad Rahim	2	1	3
3	(Iraq)	1	Jaafar Shenaishil	2	0	2
TOTALS				12	1	13

Last updated: 2 June 2023
