= 2019–20 Bahraini Premier League =

Bahrain Premier League
- Season: 2019–20
- Champions: Al-Hidd (2nd title)
- Matches: 90
- Goals: 241 (2.68 per match)
- Top goalscorer: Kamil Al Aswad (14 goals)
- Biggest home win: Al-Riffa 5–0 Al-Hala (14 December 2019); Al-Hala 5–0 Al-Shabab (21 January 2020)
- Biggest away win: Al-Shabab 0–4 Al-Ahli (20 September 2019)
- Highest scoring: Al-Muharraq 5–3 Al-Shabab (2 October 2019)
- Longest winning run: 6 matches Al-Hidd; Al-Muharraq
- Longest unbeaten run: 7 matches Al-Muharraq
- Longest winless run: 7 matches Busaiteen
- Longest losing run: 6 matches Busaiteen
- All statistics correct as of 19 October 2020.

The 2019–20 Bahraini Premier League (also known as Nasser Bin Hamad Premier League) was the 63rd top-level football season in Bahrain. The season started on 13 September 2019, and ended on 19 October 2020.

== Team location ==
Location football club of Bahraini Premier League

== Foreign players ==
Club	Player 1	Player 2	Player 3	player 4	player 5	player 6	Former Players
Al-Ahli	(Brazil) Alexandre Hans	(Cameroon) Ernest Anang	(Netherlands) Tarik Kada	(Togo) Adewale Olufade	(Tunisia) Alaeddine Bouslimi	(Tunisia) Zied Ziadi	(Brazil) Cleiton Mineiro (France) Franck Julienne
Al-Hala	(Senegal) Ibrahima Diop						(Brazil) João Luiz (Trinidad and Tobago) Lester Peltier
Al-Hidd	(Brazil) Carlos Geovane	(Egypt) Mohamed Shawer	(Nigeria) Moses Atede	(Senegal) Mamadou Dramé	(Syria) Mohamad Fares		(Jordan) Mohammad Al-Dawud (Jordan) Mohammad Ratib
Al-Muharraq	(Brazil) Everton	(Brazil) Tiago Real	(Nigeria) Prince Aggreh				(Brazil) Lelê (Brazil) Matheus Bissi (Tunisia) Mohamed Ali Moncer
Al-Najma	(Brazil) Caculé	(Libya) Mahdi El-Houni					(Brazil) Esdras (Democratic Republic of the Congo) Olivier Osomba Osomba (Yemen) Aiman Al-Hagri
Al-Riffa	(Brazil) Vitor Gabriel	(Libya) Mohammed Soulah	(Libya) Saleh Al-Taher	(Tunisia) Maher Boulabiar			(Guinea) Alhassane Keita (Nigeria) Gege Soriola
Al-Shabab	(Nigeria) Chisom Chikatara						
Busaiteen	(Brazil) Marcos Vinicius	(France) Jean-Michel Joachim					
East Riffa	(Brazil) Élton	(Brazil) Felipe Hereda	(Brazil) Luiz Fernando	(Yemen) Ali Nasser			
Manama	(Brazil) Bruno Andrade	(Brazil) Bruno Ritter	(Syria) Israa Hamwiah	(Syria) Shadi Al Hamwi			(Brazil) Marcinho (Brazil) Pedro Henrique (Brazil) Vitor Gabriel

== League table ==
Pos	Team	Pld	W	D	L	GF	GA	GD	Pts	Qualification or relegation
1	Al-Hidd (C, Q)	18	13	2	3	29	16	+13	41	Qualification for AFC Cup group stage
2	Al-Muharraq	18	12	4	2	32	16	+16	40	Qualification for AFC Cup group stage
3	Al-Riffa	18	12	2	4	50	24	+26	38	
4	Al-Najma SC	18	9	4	5	27	22	+5	31	
5	East Riffa	18	7	4	7	18	20	−2	25	
6	Manama	18	4	8	6	18	22	−4	20	
7	Al-Ahli	18	5	2	11	19	22	−3	17	
8	Busaiteen (Q)	18	4	4	10	17	30	−13	16	Qualification for Relegation play-offs
9	Al-Shabab (R)	18	4	2	12	15	37	−22	14	Relegation to Bahraini Second Division
10	Al-Hala (R)	18	2	4	12	15	31	−16	10	Relegation to Bahraini Second Division

Updated to match(es) played on 19 October 2020. Source: Soccerway
(C) Champions; (Q) Qualified for the phase indicated; (R) Relegated

== Relegation play-off ==
=== 1st leg ===
22 October 2020
16:00

Busaiteen	4–1	Bahrain Club

=== 2nd leg ===
26 October 2020
15:00

Bahrain Club	1–0	Busaiteen

Busaiteen retained Premier League survival 4:2 on aggregate

== Results ==
Home \ Away	AHL	HAL	HID	MUH	NAJ	RIF	SHA	BUS	EAS	MAN
Al-Ahli	—	3–0	0–1	0–1	2–2	1–3	2–0	1–2	0–1	0–0
Al-Hala	1–2	—	0–1	1–2	1–2	2–3	5–0	2–1	0–2	0–0
Al-Hidd	1–0	2–1	—	4–1	1–1	0–4	2–1	2–0	1–0	2–1
Al-Muharraq	1–0	2–0	1–1	—	0–0	1–1	5–3	2–1	3–1	4–0
Al-Najma SC	2–0	4–1	1–0	1–4	—	4–2	4–1	2–1	1–0	1–1
Al-Riffa	3–1	5–0	1–2	2–1	4–0	—	3–1	5–1	3–1	3–1
Al-Shabab	0–4	0–0	0–2	0–1	1–0	1–3	—	0–1	1–3	3–1
Busaiteen	1–0	0–0	0–3	1–2	0–2	3–2	1–2	—	2–2	1–1
East Riffa	1–3	1–0	0–3	0–0	2–0	0–0	0–1	2–1	—	2–1
Manama	2–0	1–1	4–1	0–1	1–0	4–3	0–0	0–0	0–0	—

Updated to match(es) played on 19 October 2020. Source: Soccerway
Legend: Blue = home team win; Yellow = draw; Red = away team win.

== Season statistics ==
=== Top scorers ===
As of matches played 19 October 2020

Rank	Player	Club	Goals
1	(Bahrain) Kamil Al Aswad	Al-Riffa	14
2	(Cameroon) Ernest Anang	Al-Ahli	8
2	(Bahrain) Thiago Augusto	Al-Muharraq	8
4	(Libya) Mohammed Salih Ali Sola	Al-Riffa	7
4	(Senegal) Mamadou Dramé	Al-Hidd	7
4	(Brazil) Everton Nascimento	Al-Muharraq	7
4	(Bahrain) Sayed Hashim Isa	Al-Riffa	7
8	(Bahrain) Abdullah Al Hashash	Busaiteen	6
8	(Bahrain) Ali Haram	Al-Riffa	6
8	(Bahrain) Ali Madan	Al-Najma SC	6
8	(Bahrain) Ali Saeed	Al-Shabab	6
