= Sajjad Alaa =

Iraqi footballer (born 2003)

Personal information
- Full name: Sajjad Alaa Abdul-Karim
- Date of birth: 3 May 2003 (age 23)
- Place of birth: Basra, Iraq
- Height: 1.82 m (6 ft 0 in)
- Positions: Right winger; forward

Team information
- Current team: Al-Karkh

Youth career
- –2022: Al-Minaa

Senior career*
Years	Team	Apps	(Gls)
2022–2025	Al-Minaa	72	(14)
2025–2026	Najran		
2026	Al-Najaf		
2026–	Al-Karkh		

International career^{‡}
2022–2023	Iraq U20	3	(0)
2023–	Iraq U23	2	(0)
- * Club domestic league appearances and goals as of 19 May 2025 ‡ National team caps and goals as of 24 January 2024

Sajjad Alaa Abdul-Karim (Arabic: سَجَّاد عَلَاء عَبْد الْكَرِيم; born 3 May 2003) is an Iraqi professional footballer who plays as a right winger for Iraq Stars League side Al-Najaf.

== Club career ==
Alaa started playing football at the Al-Minaa Academy, and was able to win with Al-Minaa U19 team the Iraqi Youth Premier League in 2022, and was the league's top scorer.

In September 2022, he was promoted to play with the club's first team, and was able with his team to win the Iraqi Premier Division League and promotion to the Iraq Stars League, and he scored one of the winning goals in the final.

In August 2023, his contract with Al-Minaa was renewed and he played in the starting lineup regularly in the Iraqi Stars League, He was Al-Minaa's top scorer that season, scoring 8 goals, scoring against Al-Najaf, Al-Talaba, Al-Naft, Dohuk, Newroz, Al-Kahrabaa, Naft Maysan, and Dohuk again. and the team coach, Hassan Ahmed, considered him one of the main pillars of the team and considered his presence very important in every match that Al-Minaa plays. In August 2024, his contract with Al-Minaa was renewed for an additional season.

== International career ==
Alaa was first picked to represent Iraq in 2022, when the under-20 coach Emad Mohammed selected him to be a part of his 26-man squad to play in 2022 Arab Cup U-20.

He was also selected by the coach Radhi Shenaishil to be part of the 26-man Olympic squad to play in the 2024 AFC U-23 Asian Cup qualifiers for the 2024 Summer Olympics in Paris.

== Honours ==
Al-Minaa

- Iraqi Premier Division League: 2022–23
