= Yusuf Touré =

Ivorian footballer

Personal information
- Date of birth: 1 January 2000 (age 26)
- Place of birth: Abidjan, Ivory Coast
- Height: 1.76 m (5 ft 9 in)
- Position: Defensive midfielder

Team information
- Current team: Stade Tunisien
- Number: 21

Youth career
- 2008–2017: ASEC Abidjan

Senior career*
| Years | Team | Apps | (Gls) |
| 2017–2019 | Dinamo Batumi | | |
| 2019 | Betlemi Keda | | |
| 2019–2022 | Samgurali | 18 | (0) |
| 2022 | Shukura | | |
| 2022–2023 | Al-Ittihad | | |
| 2023 | Dhofar | | |
| 2024 | Al-Minaa | 14 | (0) |
| 2024– | Stade Tunisien | 37 | (1) |
- * Club domestic league appearances and goals as of 13 March 2026

Yusuf Touré (born 1 January 2000) is an Ivorian professional footballer who plays as a defensive midfielder for Tunisian Ligue Professionnelle 1 club Stade Tunisien.

== Club career ==
Touré began playing for the ASEC Abidjan youth academy at the age of eight, influenced by Gervinho, as his father played with Gervinho in that club. He then moved to Georgia through his agent who was working in Georgia. Touré passed the tests at Dinamo Batumi and they included him in the team. He spent two years there, playing mostly in the second team, but he was too young to play for the first team. After that, he moved to Betlemi Keda. During a match against Samgurali, they offered him a move to them after the end of the season and he signed a contract with the club. Touré played for Samgurali and became one of the best players in the Georgian League under the leadership of coach Ucha Sosiashvili. Touré was doing a lot of work in the midfield, stopping the opposing team's attacks and starting their own. On 12 July 2022, Touré signed with Shukura to strengthen the midfield position in the team.

Touré then moved to play in the Oman Professional League, where he signed a contract with Al-Ittihad on 18 August 2022. In January 2023, he moved to Dhofar.

Touré then moved to play in the Iraqi Premier League. He signed a contract with Al-Minaa in March 2024, traveled in April 2024 and completed his contract with the club.

== Honours ==
Samgurali

- Erovnuli Liga 2 runners-up: 2020
- Georgian Cup runners-up: 2020, 2021
