= Salem Ahmed =

Iraqi footballer (born 2002)

Personal information
- Full name: Salem Ahmed Miz'al
- Date of birth: 24 October 2002 (age 24)
- Place of birth: Basra, Iraq
- Height: 1.88 m (6 ft 2 in)
- Position: Striker

Team information
- Current team: Diyala

Youth career
- –2020: Al-Minaa

Senior career*
Years	Team	Apps	(Gls)
2020–2025	Al-Minaa	116	(25)
2025–2026	Al-Shorta	12	(1)
2026–	Diyala		

International career^{‡}
2023–	Iraq U23	3	(0)
Medal record
Men's football
Representing Iraq
AFC U-23 Asian Cup
Bronze medal – third place	2024 Qatar	Team
- * Club domestic league appearances and goals as of 15 July 2026 ‡ National team caps and goals as of 13 June 2025

Salem Ahmed (born 24 October 2002) is an Iraqi professional footballer who plays as a striker for Iraqi Stars League side Diyala.

== Club career ==
Ahmed started playing football at the Al-Minaa Academy. In February 2020, he was promoted to play with the club's first team. On 12 December 2020, he scored his first goal in the Iraqi Stars League against Al-Karkh. On 29 June 2021, he scored the winning goal against Al-Qasim in a match that ended in Al-Minaa's favor with a score of 2–1. The following season, Ahmed finished as the team's top scorer in the Iraqi Stars League despite the team's relegation to the Iraqi Premier Division League. He scored seven goals, scoring against Al-Quwa Al-Jawiya, Al-Qasim, Newroz, Newroz again, Al-Najaf, and Al-Kahrabaa.

In September 2022, his contract with Al-Minaa was renewed. Ahmed helped the team win the Iraqi Premier Division League and get promoted to the Iraqi Stars League. He was the team's top scorer, scoring eleven goals, and he scored one of the winning goals in the final.

In August 2023, his contract with Al-Minaa was renewed, and he played in the starting lineup regularly in the Iraqi Stars League, scoring 4 goals, scoring against Al-Quwa Al-Jawiya, Dohuk, and Dohuk again. The team coach, Hassan Ahmed, considered him one of the main pillars of the team and considered his presence very important in every match that Al-Minaa plays. In August 2024, his contract with Al-Minaa was renewed for an additional season.

== International career ==
Ahmed was first picked to represent Iraq in 2023, when the under-23 coach Radhi Shenaishil selected him to be a part of his 23-man squad to play in the 2023 WAFF U-23 Championship, which Iraq won for the first time in its history. He was also selected in 2024 AFC U-23 Asian Cup qualifiers for the 2024 Summer Olympics in Paris. He was the team's striker.

== Honours ==
Al-Minaa

- Iraqi Premier Division League: 2022–23

Iraq U-23

- WAFF U-23 Championship: 2023
