= Regis Baha =

Cameroonian footballer

Personal information
- Full name: Regis Samuel Baha
- Date of birth: 21 October 1996 (age 30)
- Place of birth: Yaoundé, Cameroon
- Height: 1.85 m (6 ft 1 in)
- Position: Midfielder

Team information
- Current team: FAP
- Number: 27

Youth career
- Ismaco

Senior career*
Years	Team	Apps	(Gls)
2012–2013	Unisport Bafang		
2013	Renaissance Ngoumou		
2014–2017	AS Marsa	43	(6)
2018–2020	Napredak Kruševac	34	(1)
2020–2023	Mladost Lučani	87	(0)
2023–2025	Al-Minaa		
2023–	FAP	18	(0)

International career
2012	Cameroon U16		
- * Club domestic league appearances and goals as of 14 May 2026

Regis Samuel Baha (born 21 October 1996) is a Cameroonian professional footballer who plays as a midfielder for Serbian club FAP.

== Club career ==
Born in Yaoundé, after having had formation in Ismaco, he started playing at Unisport FC de Bafang in 2012 and in 2013 he became the youngest player of their senior team playing in the Cameroonian Elite One in 2013. He then spend 6 months at Renaissance FC de Ngoumou.

Then he moved abroad and signed with Tunisian side AS Marsa playing with them in the Tunisian Ligue Professionnelle 1 between 2014 and 2017. He arrived at Marsa as former Cameroonian cadet international and being only 17 and half years-old. His great performances soon granted him a change from shirt number 6 to number 10. However, AS Marsa ended relegated at the end of the 2016–17 season and, since leagues of the Magheb don't allow foreigners in the lower-levers, Marsa had to end contract with its best player.

In summer 2018, Baha moved to Europe, and had a successful trial that got him a contract with Serbian top-flight side FK Napredak Kruševac. He made his league debut on 29 July 2018, in the second round in an away game against FK Mačva Šabac.

== International career ==
Baha was part of Cameroon side at the Montaigu Tournament in 2012.
