= Karrar Jaafar =

Iraqi footballer (born 2006)

Personal information
- Full name: Karrar Jaafar Gatea
- Date of birth: 29 July 2006 (age 20)
- Place of birth: Basra, Iraq
- Height: 1.65 m (5 ft 5 in)
- Positions: Left winger; forward

Team information
- Current team: Al-Minaa
- Number: 10

Youth career
- –2022: Al-Minaa

Senior career*
Years	Team	Apps	(Gls)
2022–	Al-Minaa	81	(15)

International career^{‡}
2022–2023	Iraq U17	8	(1)
2023–2025	Iraq U20	9	(3)
2025–	Iraq U23	1	(0)
- * Club domestic league appearances and goals as of 14 September 2025 ‡ National team caps and goals as of 7 September 2025

Karrar Jaafar Gatea (Arabic: كَرَّار جَعْفَر كَاطِع; born 29 July 2006) is an Iraqi professional footballer who plays as a left winger for Iraq Stars League side Al-Minaa.

== Club career ==
Jaafar started playing football at the Al-Minaa Academy, and won with Al-Minaa U19 team, the Iraqi Youth Premier League in 2022. In September 2022, he was promoted to play with the club's first team, and they won the Iraqi Premier Division League and gained promotion to the Iraq Stars League. He scored five goals, scoring against Al-Jolan, Al-Hussein, Afak, Al-Samawa and Al-Shirqat.

In August 2023, his contract with Al-Minaa was renewed and he played in the starting lineup regularly in the Iraqi Stars League, He was Al-Minaa's top scorer that season, scoring 8 goals, scoring against Al-Najaf, Al-Hudood, Al-Zawraa, Karbala, Zakho, Erbil, Naft Maysan, and Dohuk. His rocket goal against Al-Najaf goalkeeper Sarhang Muhsin was considered a strange phenomenon in the league, as it was the goal of the youngest player in the league (16 years old) against the oldest goalkeeper in the league (37 years old). In August 2024, his contract with Al-Minaa was renewed for an additional season. He did not play much in the 2024–25 season, as the club allowed him to participate in the AFC U-20 Asian Cup in China after initially refusing to allow him. However, after the championship ended, he returned to participate in several matches, and on March 7, 2025, he scored the winning goal against Erbil in the away match. On 2 July 2025, he came on as a substitute and scored a goal against Diyala, as Al-Minaa won 3–0.

== International career ==
Jaafar was first picked to represent Iraq in 2022, when the under-17 coach Ahmed Kadhim selected him to be a part of his 23-man squad to play in 2022 Arab Cup U-17. In his first match, he scored the best goal in the tournament against Morocco. He was also part of the squad for the 2023 AFC U-17 Asian Cup qualification.

He was also selected by the coach Emad Mohammed to be part of the 26-man Iraq U20 squad to play in the 2024 WAFF U-19 Championship. He was also named in the 2025 AFC U-20 Asian Cup qualification in Thailand and played the first match against Brunei and scored two goals, provided two assists and caused a penalty in this match. He also scored the winner against Thailand in the final round match, helping his team qualify for the 2025 AFC U-20 Asian Cup in China.

He was also part of under-23 squad for the 2026 AFC U-23 Asian Cup qualification in Cambodia,

== Honours ==
Al-Minaa

- Iraqi Premier Division League: 2022–23
