= Dare Olatunji =

Nigerian footballer (born 1997)

Personal information
- Full name: Oluwadamilare Mathew Olatunji
- Date of birth: 24 November 1997 (age 28)
- Place of birth: Nigeria
- Height: 1.72 m (5 ft 8 in)
- Position: Defensive midfielder

Team information
- Current team: Naft Maysan
- Number: 23

Senior career*
Years	Team	Apps	(Gls)
2016–2018	Osun United		
2018–2021	Enyimba	35	(0)
2021–2023	Shooting Stars	28	(1)
2023	Samtredia	19	(1)
2024	Al-Minaa	14	(0)
2024–	Naft Maysan	55	(2)

International career^{‡}
2019	Nigeria U23	4	(0)
- * Club domestic league appearances and goals as of 12 March 2026 ‡ National team caps and goals as of 25 March 2019

Oluwadamilare Mathew "Dare" Olatunji (born 24 November 1997) is a Nigerian professional footballer who plays as a defensive midfielder for Iraq Stars League club Naft Maysan.

== Club career ==
Dare Olatunji started playing for Osun United, and played for them for two seasons, then moved to Enyimba International Football in 2018. In his first season, his team won the 2019 Nigeria Professional Football League (NPFL) and qualified for the CAF Champions League.

In 2021 Olatunji moved to joined Shooting Stars with his fellow Enyimba star Wasiu Alalade. On 30 January 2022, he scored his first goal with Shooting Stars in his team’s 1-0 win against MFM F.C.

In 2023 Olatunji moved to joined Georgian side FC Samtredia, Samtredia got their season off to a start, beating Telavi 1-0 with Olatunji participating in the win, for the full ninety minutes of the match. On 28 May 2023. Olatunji scored his first goal for his club Samtredia and helped them win 1-0 against Gagra.

== International career ==
Olatunji was first picked to represent Nigeria in 2019, when the under-23 coach Imama Amapakabo selected Olatunji to be a part of his squad to play in 2019 U-23 Africa Cup of Nations qualification.

== Honours ==
Enyimba

- Nigeria Professional Football League: 2019
