= Ali Nasser Ali Hasan =

Yemeni footballer

Ali Nasser
Personal information
- Full name: Ali Nasser Ali Hasan
- Date of birth: 23 November 1996 (age 29)
- Place of birth: Riyadh, Saudi Arabia
- Height: 1.69 m (5 ft 7 in)
- Position: Midfielder

Team information
- Current team: Sitra

Youth career
- 2014–2018: Santboià

Senior career*
Years	Team	Apps	(Gls)
2019–2020	East Riffa		
2021	Slavia Mozyr	1	(0)
2021–	East Riffa		

International career^{‡}
2024-	Yemen	1	(1)
- * Club domestic league appearances and goals as of 31 July 2021 ‡ National team caps and goals as of 19 November 2024

Ali Nasser Ali Hasan (Arabic: علي ناصر علي; born 23 November 1996) is a Yemeni professional footballer who plays for East Riffa.

== International ==
As of 19 November 2024

Appearances and goals by national team and year
National team	Year	Apps	Goals
Yemen	2024	2	1
Total		2	1

No.	Date	Venue	Opponent	Score	Result	Competition
1	19 November 2024	Al-Khor SC Stadium, Doha, Qatar	Sri Lanka	2–0	2–0	Friendly
