= Adewale Olufade =

Togolese footballer

Personal information
- Full name: Adewale James Olufade
- Date of birth: 21 August 1994 (age 32)
- Place of birth: Lomé, Togo
- Height: 1.80 m (5 ft 11 in)
- Position: Left back

Team information
- Current team: Abu Muslim FC

Senior career*
Years	Team	Apps	(Gls)
2009	AC Merlan		
2010–2012	Dynamic Togolais		
2013–2014	Panthère du Ndé		
2015	AS Togo-Port		
2016	New Star de Douala		
2017–2019	Union Douala		
2019–2020	Al Ahli (Manama)		
2020–2022	Manama Club		
2022–2023	AS OTR Lomé		
2023–2024	Al-Shabab (Manama)		
2024–2025	Al Nasr (Salalah)	6	(0)
2025–	Abu Muslim FC		

International career
2018–2021	Togo	12	(0)
- * Club domestic league appearances and goals as of 19:04, 29 June 2025 (UTC)

Adewale James Olufade (born 21 August 1994) is a Togolese international footballer who plays as a left back for Abu Muslim FC.

== Club career ==
Born in Lomé, he has played club football for AC Merlan, Dynamic Togolais, Panthère du Ndé, AS Togo-Port, New Star de Douala, Union Douala, Al Ahli (Manama), Manama Club, AS OTR Lomé, Al-Shabab (Manama), and Al Nasr (Salalah).

In June 2025 he signed for Abu Muslim FC.

== International career ==
He made his international debut for Togo in 2018. In October 2018 the Gambian Football Federation (GFF) complained to the Confederation of African Football (CAF) about Olufade, alleging that he was Nigerian and ineligible to play for Togo; the claims were denied by the Togolese Football Federation. After that complaint was rejected, in February 2019 the GFF confirmed that CAF would hear their appeal. The appeal was rejected, and the original decision was upheld. In March 2019 GFF appealed to the Court of Arbitration for Sport.
