= Abdoulaye Karim Doudou =

Nigerien footballer

Karim
Personal information
- Full name: Abdoulaye Karim Doudou
- Date of birth: 25 September 1998 (age 28)
- Place of birth: Niamey, Niger
- Height: 1.85 m (6 ft 1 in)
- Position: Defender

Team information
- Current team: Al-Minaa

Youth career
- –2016: Soccer Intellectuals FC
- 2016–2017: Leixões

Senior career*
Years	Team	Apps	(Gls)
2017–2018	Leixões B	21	(2)
2021–2023	Dakkada	34	(1)
2023–	Al-Minaa	0	(0)

International career^{‡}
2017	Niger U17		
2017–	Niger	3	(0)
- * Club domestic league appearances and goals as of 11:44, 27 September 2023 (UTC) ‡ National team caps and goals as of 11:44, 28 March 2022 (UTC)

Abdoulaye Karim Doudou (born 25 September 1998) is a Nigerien footballer who currently plays as a defender for Iraqi club Al-Minaa in Iraqi Professional League.

== Career statistics ==
=== International ===
As of matches played 28 March 2022.

National team	Year	Apps	Goals
Niger	2017	1	0
Niger	2018	2	0
Total		3	0
