= Jaafar Shenaishil =

Iraqi footballer (born 2003)

Personal information
- Full name: Jaafar Shenaishil Luaibi
- Date of birth: 26 April 2003 (age 23)
- Place of birth: Basra, Iraq
- Height: 1.91 m (6 ft 3 in)
- Position: Goalkeeper

Team information
- Current team: Al-Minaa
- Number: 22

Youth career
- –2022: Al-Minaa

Senior career*
Years	Team	Apps	(Gls)
2022–2025	Al-Minaa	40	(0)
2025–	Al-Karkh	0	(0)

International career^{‡}
2022–2023	Iraq U20	3	(0)
2023–	Iraq U23	2	(0)
- * Club domestic league appearances and goals as of 4 May 2025 ‡ National team caps and goals as of 24 January 2024

Jaafar Shenaishil (born 26 April 2003) is an Iraqi professional footballer who plays as a goalkeeper for Iraqi Stars League side Al-Karkh.

== Club career ==
Shenaishil started playing football at the Al-Minaa Academy, and was able to win with Al-Minaa U19 team the Iraqi Youth Premier League in 2022.

In September 2022, Shenaishil was promoted to play with the club's first team, and was able with his team to win the Iraqi Premier Division League and promotion to the Iraq Stars League.

In August 2023, Shenaishil's contract with Al-Minaa was renewed and he played in the starting lineup regularly in the Iraqi Stars League, and got 12 clean sheets, and won the Goalkeeper of the Round award in December 2023 and July 2024, and the team coach, Hassan Ahmed, considered him one of the main pillars of the team and considered his presence very important in every match that Al-Minaa plays. In August 2024, his contract with Al-Minaa was renewed for an additional season.

== International career ==
Shenaishil was first picked to represent Iraq in 2022, when the under-20 coach Emad Mohammed selected him to be a part of his 26-man squad to play in 2022 Arab Cup U-20.

Shenaishil was also selected by the coach Radhi Shenaishil to be part of the 26-man Olympic squad to play in the 2024 AFC U-23 Asian Cup qualifiers for the 2024 Summer Olympics in Paris, after the good levels he showed in the league.

== Honours ==
Al-Minaa

- Iraqi Premier Division League: 2022–23
