= Abbas Yas =

Iraqi footballer (born 2003)

Personal information
- Date of birth: 3 July 2003 (age 23)
- Place of birth: Basra, Iraq
- Height: 1.87 m (6 ft 2 in)
- Position: Left back

Team information
- Current team: Al-Karkh

Youth career
- –2019: Al-Minaa

Senior career*
Years	Team	Apps	(Gls)
2019–2026	Al-Minaa	151	(5)
2026–	Al-Karkh		

International career^{‡}
2021–	Iraq U23	3	(0)
- * Club domestic league appearances and goals as of 14 September 2025 ‡ National team caps and goals as of 24 January 2024

Abbas Yas (Arabic: عَبَّاس يَاس; born 3 July 2003) is an Iraqi professional footballer who plays as a left back for Iraqi Stars League side Al-Minaa. He also played as a defensive midfielder and centre back.

== Club career ==
Yas started playing football at the Al-Minaa Academy, and was able to win with Al-Minaa U16 team the Basra Clubs Youth League in March 2019.

In August 2019, he was promoted to play with the club's first team, where he was chosen by the team's coach Valeriu Tița. On 12 July 2021, he scored his first Iraqi Stars League goal against Al-Quwa Al-Jawiya and helped his team win that match. On 18 July 2021, in the following match, he scored the drew against Naft Al-Wasat and saved his team from losing. On 11 December 2021, he scored the drew against Al-Karkh in a match that ended 1–1. On 9 September 2022, the club's management renewed Yas's contract for an additional season with a number of players. and was able with his team to win the Iraqi Premier Division League and promotion to the Iraq Stars League.

In August 2023, his contract with Al-Minaa was renewed and he played in the starting lineup regularly in the Iraqi Stars League. On 6 April 2024, he scored a long-range goal against Al-Karkh in a match that Al-Minaa lost 3–1. In August 2024, his contract with Al-Minaa was renewed for an additional season.

== International career ==
Yas was first picked to represent Iraq in 2021, when the under-23 coach Miroslav Soukup selected him to be a part of his 23-man squad to play in 2022 AFC U-23 Asian Cup qualification. He played in the starting lineup in the matches and helped his team win and qualify for the 2022 AFC U-23 Asian Cup.

== Honours ==
Al-Minaa

- Iraqi Premier Division League: 2022–23
