= Mohammed Shokan =

Iraqi footballer

Personal information
- Full name: Mohammed Jabbar Shokan Al Mayyahi
- Date of birth: 21 May 1993 (age 33)
- Place of birth: Basra, Iraq
- Height: 1.78 m (5 ft 10 in)
- Position: Second striker

Team information
- Current team: Al-Minaa

Senior career*
Years	Team	Apps	(Gls)
2009–2012	Al-Minaa	51	(7)
2012	Erbil	?	(0)
2012–2013	Al-Quwa Al-Jawiya	?	(1)
2013–2017	Al-Minaa	88	(18)
2017–2018	Al-Ramtha	18	(9)
2018–2019	Al-Shorta	5	(0)
2019	Al-Minaa	18	(14)
2019	Naft Al-Wasat		
2020	Kazma		
2020–2021	Al-Shorta	14	(0)
2021–	Al-Minaa		

International career^{‡}
2011–2013	Iraq U20	13	(5)
2012–2014	Iraq U23	?	(1)
2016–	Iraq	9	(1)
- * Club domestic league appearances and goals as of 22 July 2019 ‡ National team caps and goals as of 23 September 2016

Mohammed Jabbar Shokan (Arabic: محمد شوكان; born 21 May 1993 in Basra, Iraq) is an Iraqi footballer who plays as a forward for Al-Minaa in the Iraqi Premier League.

== International career ==
On 24 July 2016, Shokan won his first international cap with Iraq against Uzbekistan in a friendly match.

=== International goals ===
Scores and results list Iraq's goal tally first.

#	Date	Venue	Opponent	Score	Result	Competition
1.	4 August 2018	Faisal Al-Husseini International Stadium, Al-Ram, Palestine	Palestine	3–0	3–0	Friendly

== Honours ==
=== International ===
Iraq U-23

- AFC U-22 Championship: 2013
