= Ayad Abd Farhan =

Iraqi footballer (born 1998)

Personal information
- Full name: Ayad Abd Farhan
- Date of birth: 9 June 2002 (age 24)
- Place of birth: Iraq
- Height: 1.76 m (5 ft 9 in)
- Position: Attacking midfielder

Team information
- Current team: Al-Shorta

Senior career*
Years	Team	Apps	(Gls)
–2021	Al-Nasiriya		
2021–2022	Zakho		
2022–2024	Al-Minaa	53	(6)
2024–2025	Newroz		
2025	Naft Al-Basra		
2025–2026	Diyala		
2026–	Al-Shorta		
- * Club domestic league appearances and goals as of 4 July 2026

Ayad Abd Farhan (Arabic: إِيَاد عَبْد فَرْحَان; born 9 June 2002) is an Iraqi professional footballer who plays as an attacking midfielder for Iraq Stars League side Al-Shorta SC.

== Career ==
=== Early career ===
Ayad is from the city of Nasiriyah and played in various local teams before joining Al-Nasiriya SC where he played for a season, before joining Iraqi Premier League side Zakho. He spent one season in Zakho but struggled for playtime.

=== Al Mina'a ===
He moved south and joined Iraqi division side Al-Minaa SC where he was an instrumental figure in getting them promoted back to the Premier League. He signed a new contract in September 2023 to remain in the club for another season The following season he once again remained an important part of the team as the club managed to escape relegation despite financial and administrative issues. In July, he scored the season's quickest goal, netting in 27 seconds against Duhok SC. In August he signed a new contract to remain at Al Mina'a for the 2024–2025 season.

Despite signing a new contract, Ayad announced that he agreed to leave the club by mutual consent a week later.

=== Newroz ===
On September 10, 2024, Ayad joined Newroz on a free transfer after being released from Al Mina'a.

== Honors ==
Al-Minaa

- Iraqi Premier Division League: 2022–23
