= Ernest Thierry Anang =

Cameroonian footballer

Ernest Anang
Personal information
- Full name: Ernest Thierry Anang
- Date of birth: 7 December 1994 (age 31)
- Place of birth: Bangangté, Cameroon
- Height: 1.88 m (6 ft 2 in)
- Position: Forward

Senior career*
Years	Team	Apps	(Gls)
–2013	Panthère du Ndé		
2013–2015	Espérance de Tunis		
2014	→ Stade Tunisien (loan)	16	(1)
2014–2015	→ Stade Tunisien (loan)	7	(1)
2015–2017	Métlaoui	31	(3)
2017	Marsa	14	(0)
2017–2019	Safa	33	(9)
2019	Al-Shabab		(6)
2019–2020	Al-Ahli		(8)
2020–2021	Al-Rustaq		
2021	Al-Khaldiya		
2021–2022	Al-Thoqbah		
2022	Al-Najaf		(9)
2022–2023	Al Dhaid		
2023	Al-Minaa		
2024	Amanat Baghdad		
- * Club domestic league appearances and goals as of 27 September 2024

Ernest Thierry Anang (born 7 December 1994) is a Cameroonian footballer who plays as a forward.
