= Abdelhakim Aklidou =

Moroccan footballer (born 1997)

Personal information
- Date of birth: 2 July 1997 (age 29)
- Place of birth: Morocco
- Position: Defender

Team information
- Current team: Al-Minaa
- Number: 4

Senior career*
Years	Team	Apps	(Gls)
2016–2020	CR Al Hoceima	41	(1)
2020–2022	Ittihad Tanger	20	(0)
2022–	Al-Minaa	6	(1)

International career
2013	Morocco U17	1	(0)
- * Club domestic league appearances and goals as of 7 February 2023

Abdelhakim Aklidou (born 2 July 1997) is a Moroccan professional footballer who plays as a defender for Iraq Premier League club Al-Minaa.

== Career ==
On 29 October 2020, Aklidou signed a three-year contract with Ittihad Tanger.

On 15 September 2022, Al-Minaa Club announced the signing of three professional players, including Aklidou.
