= Hassan Ahmed (footballer) =

Iraqi footballer and coach

Personal information
- Full name: Hassan Ahmed Ali
- Date of birth: 1 July 1956 (age 70)
- Place of birth: Baghdad, Iraq
- Position: Defender

Team information
- Current team: Al-Minaa (manager)

Senior career*
| Years | Team | Apps | (Gls) |
| 1978–1981 | Al-Tijara | | |
| 1981–1984 | Al-Jaish | | |
| 1984–1988 | Al-Tijara | | |

International career
| 1978 | Iraq U20 | | |

Managerial career
- 1993–1994: Al-Tijara
- 1994–1996: Racing
- 1996–1997: Shabab Al Sahel
- 1997–1998: Al Ahli
- 1998–1999: Al-Sinaa
- 1999–2000: Erbil
- 2004: Iraq U20
- 2006: Iraq U14
- 2007: Iraq U17
- 2009: Iraq U20
- 2011–2013: Al-Kahrabaa
- 2013–2014: Masafi Al-Wasat
- 2014–2015: Naft Maysan
- 2015–2019: Al-Naft
- 2019–2020: Al-Najaf
- 2021: Al-Talaba
- 2021–2022: Al-Karkh
- 2022: Al-Najaf
- 2022: Al-Naft
- 2023–2024: Al-Minaa
- 2024–: Karbala
- * Club domestic league appearances and goals

Hassan Ahmed Ali (Arabic: حَسَن أَحْمَد عَلِيّ; born 1 July 1956), commonly known by the nickname Al-Shater (Arabic: الشَّاطِر, Mesopotamian Arabic: intelligent in work), is an Iraqi professional football manager and former player who is the manager of Iraq Stars League club Al-Minaa.

== International career ==
Ahmed was first picked to represent Iraq in 1978, when the under-20 coach Lenko Grčić selected Ahmed to be a part of his 25-man squad to play in 1978 AFC Youth Championship.

== Coaching career ==
=== Al Tijara and stints in Lebanon. ===
Ahmed was a player who was very loyal to Al-Tijara. After retiring from playing, he coached Al-Tijara. He then moved to Lebanon when he coached Shabab Al Sahel, Racing and Al Ahli, after several years.

=== Iraq Youth levels ===
In 2004, he returned to Iraq and coached Al-Sinaa and Erbil. Then he moved on to coaching junior national teams, where he coached U-14, U-17, and U-20. In 2009, Ahmed led the U-19 team in the AFC U-19 Championship qualification and was able to achieve first place in it and qualify for the 2010 AFC U-19 Championship, but the team's disappointing results in the Championship led him to resign.

=== Al-Kahrabaa ===
In December 2011, Ahmed signed a contract with Al-Kahrabaa to coach his team in the Premier League, succeeding the resigned coach Shaker Mahmoud, as Mahmoud left the team while it was threatened with relegation. Finally, Ahmed was able to improve the team's results and continue to play in the Premier League, and his contract was renewed for a second season. In June 2013, the club management dismissed Ahmed from coaching the team, because he stood by the players who had not received their financial dues and they demanded it, where the management considered this an incitement by the coach to his players.

=== Masafi Al-Wasat ===
In December 2013, Ahmed signed a contract with Masafi Al-Wasat to coach his team in the Premier League, succeeding the resigned coach Nadhim Shaker, as Shaker left the team while it was threatened with relegation. At the end of the season, the contract was not renewed due to disagreement over the terms of renewal between the coach and the management.

=== Naft Maysan ===
In August 2014, Ahmed signed a contract to coach the Naft Maysan to build a young team capable of continuing to play in the Premier League, because the club did not have enough money to sign professionals or local super players. In April 2015, as the end of the season approached, Ahmed decided to leave the team due to the management's abandonment of supporting the team financially after they had guaranteed its stay in the Premier League, and after the training staff's salaries had not been paid for 9 months. This season, all the coaches of the Premier League clubs were dismissed due to poor results, and were replaced, except for Ahmed, who remained at the head of Naft Maysan's technical team until the end of the season.

=== Al-Naft ===
In May 2015, Al-Naft's management chose Ahmed as coach to correct the situation of its football team, because the club had not done well last season, and finished the season in penultimate place in the standings, as they were going through difficult financial difficulties, and they wanted to rely on local young players and build a young, competitive team. Al-Naft finished this season in fifth place. Before the end of the season, the club management was quick to renew the contract of Ahmed and the assistant coaching staff due to the success he achieved. In the 2016–17 season, the team finished the year 2016 at the top of the standings, with 25 rounds remaining in the lead, but at the end of the season it lost the lead to occupy runner-up position. Ahmed's contract was renewed to lead the team for the third season. The team finished the season in third place after defeating the leaders in the last league match. Ahmed's contract to lead the team was renewed for a fourth season. Things did not go well this season, due to the many injuries among the players, and the team's results declined, as it failed to win in the last seven matches, ranking seventh, so the club management decided to terminate the coach's contract in March 2019.

=== Al-Najaf & return to Al-Naft ===
In July 2019, Ahmed signed a contract with Al-Najaf, but the league was canceled in the same season after several rounds due to the COVID-19 pandemic. Due to the good results he achieved in the rounds played in the previous season, in which the team did not lose, the club management decided to renew coach Ahmed's contract. But Ahmed decided to resign from coaching the team in late December 2020 due to his salary not being paid by the club management for 5 months. In January 2021, Ahmed contracted with Al-Talaba, but was dismissed in April due to poor results. In November 2021, Ahmed contracted with Al-Karkh, But he resigned in February 2022 due to poor results. Two days later, he signed with Al-Najaf again. He ended the season with them and his contract was not renewed. In July 2022, Ahmed signed with Al-Naft again. In November 2022, he submitted his resignation due to poor results.

=== Al-Minaa ===
In November 2023, Ahmed signed a contract with Al-Minaa. The team was all young, and their number was very small, only 16 players, due to FIFA banning Al-Minaa from signing contracts. Ahmed considered that this situation represented a difficult challenge for any coach, but he win in his first match, and was able to energize the players and change their bad psychological state. He improved the team's performance match after match, and was even chosen as the best coach in the seventh round of the league. Then he was re-selected as the best coach in the 17th round after defeating third-placed Duhok with a score of 2–0. He was also chosen as the best coach in the 35th round after leading his team to victory over Naft Maysan with a score of 3–0. After the high levels he presented with his young team and ensuring his stay in the league for the next season, Al-Minaa management decided to renew coach Hassan Ahmed's contract for a new season and give him all the powers to build a strong team that competes for the top four places. But Ahmed apologized for continuing to train the national team due to his personal circumstances.

=== Karbala ===
In September 2024, Ahmed signed a contract with Karbala.

== Personal life ==
Ahmed is a fan of the German player Beckenbauer, and a fan of the Italian club Inter Milan.

== Managerial statistics ==
As of 21 September 2024

Managerial record by team and tenure
| Team | From | To | Record | | | | |
| Team | From | To | P | W | D | L | Win % |
|---|---|---|---|---|---|---|---|
| Al-Kahrabaa | 16 December 2011 | 18 June 2013 | 69 | 24 | 20 | 25 | 34.8 |
| Masafi Al-Wasat | 23 December 2013 | 13 July 2014 | 14 | 2 | 6 | 6 | 14.3 |
| Naft Maysan | 3 August 2014 | 30 April 2015 | 16 | 3 | 8 | 5 | 18.8 |
| Al-Naft | 20 May 2015 | 12 March 2019 | 130 | 67 | 43 | 20 | 51.5 |
| Al-Najaf | 23 July 2019 | 28 December 2020 | 14 | 6 | 6 | 2 | 42.9 |
| Al-Talaba | 8 January 2021 | 28 April 2021 | 16 | 3 | 3 | 10 | 18.8 |
| Al-Karkh | 7 November 2021 | 19 February 2022 | 14 | 2 | 7 | 5 | 14.3 |
| Al-Najaf | 21 February 2022 | 23 June 2022 | 9 | 2 | 7 | 0 | 22.2 |
| Al-Naft | 5 July 2022 | 1 November 2022 | 5 | 0 | 1 | 4 | 0.0 |
| Al-Minaa | 19 November 2023 | 17 July 2024 | 38 | 13 | 11 | 14 | 34.2 |
| Karbala | 2 September 2024 | present | 1 | 0 | 1 | 0 | 0.0 |
| Total | | | 326 | 122 | 113 | 91 | 37.4 |

== Honours and achievements ==
=== Player ===
Al-Jaish

- Iraq Stars League: 1983–84
- Iraq FA Cup: 1982–83

Iraq U20

- AFC U-20 Asian Cup: 1978

=== Manager ===
Al-Naft

- Iraq Stars League runner-up: 2016–17
