= Naft Maysan SC =

Iraqi football club

Naft Missan
- Full name: Naft Missan Sports Club
- Nickname: Fursan Al Mamlaka (Kingdom Knights)
- Founded: 2003; 23 years ago
- Ground: Maysan Olympic Stadium
- Capacity: 25,000
- Chairman: Ahmed Salem
- Manager: Uday Ismail
- League: Iraq Stars League
- 2025–26: Iraq Stars League, 16th of 20
- Website: https://naftmissan.com/
Home colours	Away colours

Naft Maysan SC (also known as Naft Missan) (Arabic: نادي نفط ميسان, lit. 'Maysan's Oil') is an Iraqi professional football club based in Amarah, Maysan that competes in the Iraq Stars League, the top flight of football in Iraq.

== History ==
Naft Maysan Sports Club was founded in 2003 by the Ministry of Oil. In 2009–10 season, the club was playing in the Iraqi Premier League until it relegated to Iraqi First Division League in the 2011 season. But the team returned to play in the Iraqi Premier League after winning the runner-up in the 2012–13 Iraqi First Division League where it remains.

== Oil Minister's Cup ==
In addition to the club's participation in the Iraqi Premier League and Iraq FA Cup, the club participates in Oil Minister's Cup championship with the clubs belonging to the Ministry of Oil periodically.

== Current squad ==
=== First-team squad ===
As of 15 September 2024

Note: Flags indicate national team as defined under FIFA eligibility rules; some limited exceptions apply. Players may hold more than one non-FIFA nationality.

No.	Pos.	Nation	Player
1	GK	IRQ	Hassan Najem
2	DF	IRQ	Mustafa Mohammed
5	DF	CIV	Alexandré Yeoule ^{FGN}
7	MF	IRQ	Jafar Nasser
8	MF	IRQ	Ahmed Mohammed
10	MF	IRQ	Alaa Saad
11	MF	IRQ	Ali Lateef
14	MF	IRQ	Haider Mohsin
15	MF	IRQ	Wissam Saadoun
18	MF	IRQ	Abbas Fadhel
19	MF	IRQ	Hussein Ali
20	FW	YEM	Ahmed Maher ^{ARB}
21	MF	IRQ	Obaida Kadhim
22	GK	IRQ	Hassan Najim
23	MF	IRQ	Sajjad Jabbar
24	DF	CIV	Soualio Dabilo Ouattara ^{FGN}

No.	Pos.	Nation	Player
25	DF	IRQ	Hussein Mutar
26	DF	IRQ	Ammar Kadhim
27	DF	IRQ	Mohammed Saeed
31	MF	IRQ	Akram Raheem (captain)
32	MF	NGA	Dare Olatunji ^{FGN}
35	FW	NGA	Usman Sale ^{FGN}
36	MF	IRQ	Salam Mohammed
45	FW	BHR	Mahdi Abdulljabbar
70	FW	IRQ	Ali Sabeeh
—	DF	IRQ	Mohammed Salam
—	DF	IRQ	Mohannad Habeeb
—	DF	IRQ	Mustafa Hadi
—	MF	SYR	Ali Koute ^{ARB}
—	MF	IRQ	Murtadha Kassad
—	FW	SEN	Daouda Diémé

=== Youth team squad ===
As of 9 May 2023

Note: Flags indicate national team as defined under FIFA eligibility rules; some limited exceptions apply. Players may hold more than one non-FIFA nationality.

No.	Pos.	Nation	Player
1		IRQ	Mustafa Arif
2		IRQ	Baqer Qasim
3		IRQ	Moammel Saadoun
4		IRQ	Abu Al-Hassan Al-Kareem
5		IRQ	Nasrullah Ahmed
6		IRQ	Nour Aldin Qasim
7		IRQ	Hamza Mahdi
8		IRQ	Hayder Sadiq
9		IRQ	Fiqar Abid
11		IRQ	Hassan Hussein
12		IRQ	Ali Abdul-Kareem
13		IRQ	Muqtada Kamel
14		IRQ	Mohammed Jabbar
15		IRQ	Ahmed Uday
16		IRQ	Ali Salman
17		IRQ	Muqtada Saad

No.	Pos.	Nation	Player
18		IRQ	Muntadher Maytham
19		IRQ	Muqtada Hamdan
20		IRQ	Hussein Kadhim
21		IRQ	Sajjad Jumaa
22		IRQ	Sajjad Sabeeh
23		IRQ	Mohammed Qasim Gatea
24		IRQ	Moammel Hassan
25		IRQ	Muntadher Kheraal
26		IRQ	Abdul-Muttalib Ahmed
27		IRQ	Yousif Ahmed
28		IRQ	Hayder Ali
29		IRQ	Mustafa Adel
31		IRQ	Hussein Saeed
32		IRQ	Moammel Fadhil
33		IRQ	Abbas Fadhil
34		IRQ	Muqtada Faisal
36		IRQ	Jaafer Ghazi

== Current technical staff ==
Position	Name	Nationality
Manager:	Uday Ismail	(Iraq)
Assistant manager:	Shafiq Jabal	(Iraq)
Assistant manager:	Ashraf ben Razzaq	(Iraq)
Goalkeeping coach:	Ahmed Abdul Ridha	(Iraq)
Director of football:	Hamid Kareem	(Iraq)
Administrative director:	Ali Dawoud	(Iraq)
Team analyst:	Ramadan Al-Zubaidy	(Iraq)
Club doctor:	Aboud Hameed	(Iraq)
U-16 Manager:	Sattar Shet	(Iraq)

Updated to match played 9 July 2022
Source: kooora.com

== Managerial history ==
- (Iraq) Ahmed Salim (2009–2010)
- (Iraq) Ahmed Daham (2010–2011)
- (Syria) Hussein Afash (2013)
- (Iraq) Sabah Abdul Jalil (2013–2014)
- (Iraq) Asaad Abdul Razzaq (2014–2014)
- (Iraq) Hassan Ahmed (2014–2015)
- (Iraq) Abbas Obeid (2015-2015)
- (Iraq) Ahmed Daham (2015–2016)
- (Iraq) Uday Ismail (2016–2018)
- (Iraq) Ahmed Daham (2018–2020)
- (Iraq) Razzaq Farhan (2020–2021)
- (Iraq) Uday Ismail (2021–2021)
- (Iraq) Thair Jassam (2021–2021)
- (Iraq) Asaad Abdul Razzaq (2021–2022)
- (Iraq) Ahmed Khalaf (2022)
- (Iraq) Uday Ismail (2022–)

== Records ==
=== Statistics ===
The season-by-season performance of the club over the recent years:

Season	League	Rank	P	W	D	L	F	A	GD	Pts	Cup
2009–10	Iraqi Premier League	17	34	12	11	11	44	37	+7	47	—
2010–11	Iraqi Premier League	20	26	6	7	13	20	29	–9	25	—
2011–12	Iraqi First Division League	2 – Group 2	28	17	4	7	58	34	+24	55	—
2012–13	Iraqi First Division League	2	30	19	7	4	72	30	+42	64	1PO
2013–14	Iraqi Premier League	13	21	6	6	9	25	29	–4	24	—
2014–15	Iraqi Premier League	12	16	3	8	5	14	20	–6	17	—
2015–16	Iraqi Premier League	10	17	3	6	5	16	16	0	24	—
2016–17	Iraqi Premier League	11	36	8	15	13	28	36	–8	39	QF
2017–18	Iraqi Premier League	8	38	13	10	15	45	37	+8	49	—
2018–19	Iraqi Premier League	5	38	15	14	9	57	47	+10	59	QF
2019–20^{(1)}	Iraqi Premier League	—	6	0	1	5	5	12	—	—	R16^{(2)}
2020–21	Iraqi Premier League	13	38	9	16	13	38	48	–10	43	R32
2021–22	Iraqi Premier League	12	38	10	16	12	30	34	–4	46	R32
2022–23	Iraqi Premier League	11	38	13	12	13	42	54	–12	51	QF
2023–24	Iraq Stars League	10	38	10	17	11	41	40	+1	47	QF
2024–25	Iraq Stars League	11	38	14	9	15	42	46	–4	51	2R
2025–26	Iraq Stars League	16	38	11	9	18	46	58	–12	42	R16^{(2)}

^{1} The league was not completed and was cancelled.
^{2} Naft Maysan had not yet been eliminated from the cup but it was abandoned midway through.

=== All-time top goalscorers ===
As of 16 July 2019

#	Nat.	Name	Career	Goals
1	Iraq	**Wissam Saadoun**	2009–2019	48
2	Iraq	**Ahmed Saeed**	2015–2019	19
3	Iraq	**Karrar Ali**	2016–2019	12
4	Iraq	**Hassan Hamoud**	2009–2019	11
4	Iraq	Thamir Barghash	2013–2019	11
5	Iraq	Ali Abed Thyab	2009–2011	10
6	Lebanon	Khodor Salame	2013–2015	9
7	Iraq	**Mohammed Zamil**	2009–2019	8

- Players in **bold** are still available for selection.
