= 2026–27 Al-Mina'a SC season =

Al-Mina'a SC
2026–27 season
- Chairman: Haider Abboud Salman (interim) (until 18 August); Asaad Al Eidani (interim) (from 29 August)
- Manager: Hussein Abdul-Wahid (until 13 September); Miodrag Radulović (from 1 October)
- Ground: Al-Minaa Olympic Stadium; Al-Fayhaa Stadium
- Iraq Stars League: 2nd
- FA Cup: First round
Home colours	Away colours

The 2026–27 season is Al-Minaa's fourth season in the Iraq Stars League since its establishment, and the club's 50th season in the top tier of Iraqi football.

== Review ==
=== Background ===
Al-Minaa has experienced prolonged administrative instability for several years, a situation that has significantly affected the club's performances in recent seasons. In the previous league campaign, the team finished 15th in the league standings. The team was consistently affected by changes in the club's management, in addition to the uncertainty over whether the head coach and his technical staff would remain with the team. At times, the head coach led the team; at other times, the assistant coach took charge; and on other occasions, the entire coaching staff resigned. This situation cast a dark shadow over the team's condition. Furthermore, the club experienced administrative problems throughout the previous season, which had a number of repercussions. Financial support declined, causing some players to boycott matches, forcing the team to play its final eight matches with a squad of young players. Despite all these difficulties, the team ultimately managed to remain in the Professional League, though only with great difficulty. On 26 May 2026, the Iraqi Olympic Committee appointed a temporary administrative board for the club for the ninth time in recent years, pending elections to select a new permanent board of directors. The decision was opposed by the GCPI, the club's official sponsor, which argued that the appointment conflicted with the will of Al-Minaa's General Assembly. The company stated that it had been formally authorized by the General Assembly to oversee the matter and challenge the decision through the applicable legal procedures. On 21 June 2026, the club's temporary administrative board renewed the contract of head coach Hussein Abdul-Wahid and announced that he would oversee the club's player recruitment and transfer activities in preparation for the 2026–27 season. On 8 July 2026, the club announced its coaching staff, consisting of Osama Ali and Hussam Ibrahim as assistant coaches, Ibrahim Salim as goalkeeping coach, and Mazin Abdul Sattar as fitness coach.

=== Summer transfer window ===
On 14 June 2026, the Iraqi Football Association announced the registration and transfer windows for clubs participating in the 2026–27 Iraq Stars League season. The summer transfer window was scheduled to open on 20 June 2026 and close on 31 August 2026. On 13 June 2026, Al-Minaa began reshaping its squad for the upcoming season by terminating the contracts of five foreign players as part of a technical overhaul aimed at strengthening the team with new signings following a comprehensive review of the squad's needs. The released players were Clech Loufilou, Tuisila Kisinda, Iyayi Atiemwen, Ibrahima Conté, and Reda Majji. On 14 June 2026, Al-Minaa announced its first signing of the summer transfer window, securing the services of forward Mohammed Dawood from Duhok. On 15 June 2026, Al-Minaa announced the signings of veteran defender Saad Natiq from Duhok and defensive midfielder Hassan Ali Barhi from Al-Karkh. On 19 June 2026, Al-Minaa officially announced the signings of goalkeeper Ridha Abdulaziz from Newroz and Tunisian defender Malek Miladi from US Monastir. Later that day, the club announced the signing of Armenian defensive midfielder Solomon Udo from Al-Arabi, a club competing in the Saudi First Division League. On 20 June 2026, the club renewed the contract of highly rated young winger Karrar Jaafar, one of the club's brightest emerging talents. On 25 June 2026, Al-Minaa officially re-signed former defensive midfielder Haider Salem from Amanat Baghdad, marking his return to the club. On 29 June 2026, the club signed Syrian attacking midfielder Fahd Youssef from Al-Shorta. On 1 July 2026, the club signed Nigerian winger Aminu Umar from Al-Quwa Al-Jawiya. On the same day, the club also renewed the contract of Syrian forward Yassin Samia for another season. On 2 July 2026, the club signed right-back Ahmed Abdul-Hussein and Angolan attacking midfielder Pneu Flávio, both from Amanat Baghdad. The club also announced the return of Tunisian defender Dhiaeddine Jouini on a new contract after his previous deal had been terminated during the previous season due to injury. On July 8, 2026, the club announced the signing of Abdul-Razzaq Qasim on a one-season loan from Al-Shorta. On 20 July, the club announced the mutual termination of the contract of its newly signed Algerian forward Karim Aribi, after the player was unable to travel to Iraq due to the security situation in the region. On the same day, the club strengthened its squad by signing Tunisian winger Houssem Habbassi, who joined from Kuwaiti club Al Nasr. On 31 July 2026, the club announced the signing of Syrian left-back Khaled Kourdoghli.

=== Pre-season ===
Al-Minaa began their preparations for the new season on 10 July 2026. On 18 July, the team played their first preparatory friendly match against the Iraq national under-20 football team at the Basra Sports City training pitches, which ended in a 1–0 victory for Al-Minaa. Later, the team held a training camp in Erbil from July 27 to August 6, where they played four friendly test matches: losing to Al-Mosul 2–1, defeating Naft Maysan 3–1, and drawing with Al-Naft 1–1 and Diyala 2–2.

=== Return of administrative problems ===
On August 18, the Iraqi Sports Settlement and Arbitration Center decided to dissolve the temporary administrative body of Al-Minaa SC and requested the Iraqi Olympic Committee to form a new temporary committee to run the club, which triggered a major financial crisis. The primary cause of the crisis was the GCPI—the club's official sponsor—failing to disburse the club's financial dues, alongside unfulfilled promises made by the Governor of Basra, Asaad Al Eidani to support the team and resolve its financial troubles. This sparked widespread discontent among the players, who decided to boycott training sessions until practical solutions were found to guarantee the payment of their delayed dues and restore stability to the team. Prior to this, head coach Hussein Abdul-Wahid appealed to the local government in Basra Governorate to intervene and save the club before the crisis worsened, pointing out that the lack of funding also negatively affected the condition of the Al-Minaa Olympic Stadium pitch, which appeared to be in poor shape despite being considered one of the newest stadiums in Iraq. Later, on August 22, dozens of the club's fans staged a sit-in in front of the Basra Governorate headquarters to demand the rescue of the team and the provision of necessary support. On August 29, 2026, a new temporary administrative body was formed for the club, headed by the Governor of Basra, Asaad Al Eidani.

== First-team squad ==
As of 26 August 2026

No.	Name	Nat.	Position(s)	Date of birth (age)	Signed from	Apps	Goals
Goalkeepers
1	Abed Saleem	(Iraq)	GK	14 Oct 1995 (age 31)	Al-Karkh	67	0
12	Ridha Abdulaziz	(Iraq)	GK	24 Feb 2003 (age 23)	Newroz	0	0
33	Abdullah Ghazi	(Iraq)	GK	1 Jan 1998 (age 28)	Al-Samawa	0	0
Defenders
4	Saad Natiq	(Iraq)	CB	19 Mar 1994 (age 32)	Duhok	3	0
5	Malek Miladi	(Tunisia)	CB	24 Dec 1996 (age 29)	US Monastir	3	0
15	Hassan Ali Barhi	(Iraq)	CB / DM	31 Jul 1999 (age 27)	Al-Karkh	0	0
24	Faisal Jassim	(Iraq)	RB / CB	1 Oct 1991 (age 35)	Al-Shorta	50	0
28	Ahmed Abdul-Hussein	(Iraq)	RB	22 Oct 1997 (age 29)	Amanat Baghdad	3	1
70	Khaled Kourdoghli	(Syria)	LB	31 Jan 1997 (age 29)	Duhok	3	0
77	Rasool Fadhil	(Iraq)	RB	7 Jul 2001 (age 25)	Al-Zawraa	1	0
Midfielders
6	Haider Salem	(Iraq)	DM / CB	3 Dec 1993 (age 32)	Amanat Baghdad	83	2
7	Mohammed Saleh	(Iraq)	CM	1 May 1995 (age 31)	Al-Quwa Al-Jawiya	3	0
18	Solomon Udo	(Armenia)	DM / CM	15 Jul 1995 (age 31)	Al-Arabi	2	0
25	Abdulrazzaq Qasim	(Iraq)	DM	19 Feb 2003 (age 23)	Al-Shorta	3	1
30	Fahd Youssef	(Syria)	CM / AM	15 May 1987 (age 39)	Al-Shorta	3	0
Forwards
3	Pneu Flávio	(Angola)	LW / LWB	25 Jan 2003 (age 23)	Amanat Baghdad	3	1
9	Yassin Samia	(Syria)	ST	22 Feb 1998 (age 28)	Al-Karamah	19	9
10	Karrar Jaafar	(Iraq)	LW / ST / RW	26 Apr 2006 (age 20)	Al-Minaa Academy	112	17
20	Houssem Habbassi	(Tunisia)	RW	1 Jan 1996 (age 30)	Al Nasr	3	0
23	Aymen Luay	(Iraq)	ST	23 May 2005 (age 21)	Al-Najaf	1	0
29	Mohammed Dawood	(Iraq)	RW / ST	22 Nov 2000 (age 25)	Duhok	3	0
71	Hussein Abdul Wahed	(Iraq)	RW / AM	19 Jan 1993 (age 33)	Al-Gharraf	102	5

== New contracts and transfers ==
=== New contracts ===
Date	Pos.	Name
June 2026	LW	(Iraq) Karrar Jaafar
July 2026	ST	(Syria) Yassin Samia

=== Transfers in ===
Date	Pos.	Name	From	Fee
June 2026	RW	(Iraq) Mohammed Dawood	(Iraq) Duhok	—
June 2026	CB	(Iraq) Hassan Ali Barhi	(Iraq) Al-Karkh	—
June 2026	CB	(Iraq) Saad Natiq	(Iraq) Duhok	—
June 2026	CB	(Tunisia) Malek Miladi	(Tunisia) US Monastir	—
June 2026	GK	(Iraq) Ridha Abdulaziz	(Iraq) Newroz	—
June 2026	DM	(Armenia) Solomon Udo	(Saudi Arabia) Al-Arabi	—
June 2026	DM	(Iraq) Haidar Salem	(Iraq) Amanat Baghdad	
June 2026	RB	(Iraq) Rasool Fadhil	(Iraq) Al-Zawraa	Loan
June 2026	ST	(Iraq) Aymen Luay	(Iraq) Al-Najaf	—
June 2026	CM	(Iraq) Mohammed Saleh	(Iraq) Al-Quwa Al-Jawiya	—
July 2026	RB	(Iraq) Ahmed Abdul-Hussein	(Iraq) Amanat Baghdad	—
July 2026	DM	(Iraq) Abdulrazzaq Qasim	(Iraq) Al-Shorta	Loan
July 2026	AM	(Syria) Fahd Youssef	(Iraq) Al-Shorta	—
July 2026	AM	(Angola) Pneu Flávio	(Iraq) Amanat Baghdad	—
July 2026	RW	(Tunisia) Houssem Habbassi	(Kuwait) Al Nasr	—
July 2026	LB	(Syria) Khaled Kourdoghli	(Iraq) Duhok	—
July 2026	RW	(Iraq) Hussein Abdul Wahed	(Iraq) Al-Gharraf	—

=== Transfers out ===
Date	Pos.	Name	To	Fee
June 2026	LB	(Iraq) Muslim Mousa	(Iraq) Al-Quwa Al-Jawiya	—
June 2026	ST	(Iraq) Mohannad Abdul-Raheem	(Iraq) Al-Kahrabaa	—
June 2026	RB	(Iraq) Haider Ahmed	(Iraq) Naft Maysan	—
June 2026	LW	(Morocco) Reda Majji	(Iraq) Duhok	—
June 2026	ST	(Iraq) Mohammed Nassif	(Iraq) Al-Mosul	—
June 2026	DM	(Iraq) Ali Al-Sajjad Sabah	Unattached	Released
June 2026	CB	(Iraq) Najm Shwan	Unattached	Released
July 2026	CB	(Iraq) Mohammed Ghaleb	(Iraq) Zakho	—
July 2026	RW	(Democratic Republic of the Congo) Tuisila Kisinda	(Iraq) Al-Quwa Al-Jawiya	—
July 2026	RB	(Iraq) Mujtaba Ali	(Iraq) Ghaz Al-Shamal	—
July 2026	AM	(Iraq) Ahamad Azzawi	(Iraq) Newroz	—
July 2026	CM	(Iraq) Murtadha Ali Malas	(Iraq) Al-Gharraf	—
July 2026	CB	(Guinea) Ibrahima Conté	(Iraq) Zakho	—
July 2026	GK	(Iraq) Ali Ibadi	(Iraq) Karbala	—
July 2026	LW	(Nigeria) Iyayi Atiemwen	(Iraq) Karbala	—
July 2026	LB	(Iraq) Abbas Yas	(Iraq) Al-Karkh	—
July 2026	DM	(Gabon) Clech Loufilou	(Saudi Arabia) Al-Jandal	—
July 2026	ST	(Iraq) Mahmoud Khalil	(Iraq) Al-Ramadi	—
August 2026	DM	(Iraq) Ali Mohsin	(Iraq) Al-Nasiriya	—

== Personnel ==
=== Technical staff ===
Position	Name
Manager	(Montenegro) Miodrag Radulović
Assistant coach	(Iraq) Hussam Ibrahim (Montenegro) Srđan Kljajević
Goalkeeping coach	(Iraq) Oday Taleb
Fitness coach	(Montenegro) Petar Grbić
Sports physiotherapist	(Iraq) Faris Abdullah
Team supervisor	(Iraq) Ali Fadhel Hassan

== Kits ==
Adidas were announced as Al-Minaa's kit supplier as of the start of the season.

Supplier: Adidas

Home	Away	Goalkeeper^{1}	Goalkeeper^{2}

== Pre-season and friendlies ==
27 July 2026 Friendly	Al-Mosul	2–0	Al-Minaa	Erbil
17:00 UTC+3	Sinjari 25', 39'	Report		Stadium: Handren Stadium

31 July 2026 Friendly	Naft Maysan	1–3	Al-Minaa	Erbil
17:00 UTC+3	Diémé 72'	Report	Samia 23'; Saleh 61'; Dawood 82'	Stadium: Alaa Stadium

2 August 2026 Friendly	Al-Naft	1–1	Al-Minaa	Erbil
17:00 UTC+3	Yasin 62'	Report	Samia 38'	Stadium: Handren Stadium

6 August 2026 Friendly	Diyala	2–2	Al-Minaa	Erbil
17:00 UTC+3		Report	Luay 58', 72'	Stadium: Handren Stadium

== Competitions ==
=== Overview ===
Competition	First match	Last match	Starting round	Record							
Competition	First match	Last match	Starting round	Pld	W	D	L	GF	GA	GD	Win %
Iraq Stars League	15 August 2026	28 May 2027	Matchday 1	3	2	1	0	5	1	+4	66.67
FA Cup	13 December 2026	TBD	First round	0	0	0	0	0	0	+0	—
Total				3	2	1	0	5	1	+4	66.67

Last updated: 26 August 2026
Source: Competitions

=== League table ===
Pos	Team	Pld	W	D	L	GF	GA	GD	Pts
7	Erbil	13	5	5	3	16	9	+7	20
8	Duhok	13	4	6	3	20	16	+4	18
9	Al-Minaa	13	4	5	4	12	13	−1	17
10	Ghaz Al-Shamal	13	3	7	3	9	10	−1	16
11	Al-Talaba	13	3	7	3	15	18	−3	16

Updated to match(es) played on 10 November 2026. Source: Iraq Stars League
Rules for classification: 1) points; 2) goal difference; 3) number of goals scored; 4) head-to-head points; 5) head-to-head goal difference; 6) head-to-head number of goals scored (if more than two teams are tied); 7) number of wins; 8) number of red cards; 9) number of yellow cards; 10) drawing of lots.

==== Summary table ====
Overall								Home						Away					
Pld	W	D	L	GF	GA	GD	Pts	W	D	L	GF	GA	GD	W	D	L	GF	GA	GD
3	2	1	0	5	1	+4	7	2	0	0	5	1	+4	0	1	0	0	0	0

Last updated: 26 August 2026.
Source: Goalzz.com

==== Results by matchday ====
Matchday	1	2	3	4
Ground	A	H	H	A
Result	D	W	W	
Position	13	5	2	

Updated to match(es) played on 26 August 2026. Source: Goalzz.com
A = Away; H = Home; W = Win; D = Draw; L = Loss; P = Postponed

==== Matches ====
The league fixtures were announced on 7 August 2026.

Win Draw Loss Fixtures

15 August 2026 1	Al-Zawraa	0–0	Al-Minaa	Baghdad
21:00 UTC+3	Falah (yellow card) 42'; El Ani (yellow card) 45+4'	Report	Qasim (yellow card) 8'; Youssef (yellow card) 73'	Stadium: Al-Zawraa Stadium; Referee: Yousef Saeed

20 August 2026 2	Al-Minaa	2–1	Zakho	Basra
21:00 UTC+3	Samia 39'; Dawood (yellow card) 45+1'; Miladi (yellow card) 46'; Pneu 80'	Report	Saadoon (yellow card) 11'; Orinho 45+3', (yellow card) 89'	Stadium: Al-Fayhaa Stadium; Referee: Mohammed Salah

26 August 2026 3	Al-Minaa	3–0	Al-Gharraf	Basra
21:00 UTC+3	Jaafar 8'; Abdul-Hussein 22', (yellow card) 79'; Qasim 90'	Report	Atsam (yellow card) 21'; Mohammed (yellow card) 25'	Stadium: Al-Fayhaa Stadium; Referee: Wathiq Mohammed

31 August 2026 4	Erbil	v	Al-Minaa	Erbil
21:00 UTC+3				Stadium: Franso Hariri Stadium; Referee: Mohanad Qasim

5 September 2026 5	Al-Minaa	v	Al-Naft	Basra
21:00 UTC+3				Stadium: Al-Fayhaa Stadium

9 September 2026 6	Al-Minaa	v	Naft Maysan	Basra
21:00 UTC+3				Stadium: Al-Fayhaa Stadium

13 September 2026 7	Al-Kahrabaa	v	Al-Minaa	Baghdad
18:45 UTC+3				Stadium: Al-Zawraa Stadium

18 September 2026 8	Al-Minaa	v	Duhok	Basra
21:00 UTC+3				Stadium: Al-Fayhaa Stadium

10 October 2026 9	Ghaz Al-Shamal	v	Al-Minaa	Sulaymaniyah
18:00 UTC+3				Stadium: Newroz Stadium

16 October 2026 10	Newroz	v	Al-Minaa	Sulaymaniyah
18:00 UTC+3				Stadium: Newroz Stadium

24 October 2026 11	Al-Minaa	v	Al-Karma	Basra
19:45 UTC+3				Stadium: Al-Minaa Olympic Stadium

30 October 2026 12	Al-Quwa Al-Jawiya	v	Al-Minaa	Baghdad
18:00 UTC+3				Stadium: Al-Madina Stadium

6 November 2026 13	Diyala	v	Al-Minaa	Diyala
18:00 UTC+3				Stadium: Diyala Stadium

20 November 2026 14	Al-Minaa	v	Karbala	Basra
18:00 UTC+3				Stadium: Al-Minaa Olympic Stadium

27 November 2026 15	Al-Talaba	v	Al-Minaa	Baghdad
18:00 UTC+3				Stadium: Al-Madina Stadium

4 December 2026 16	Al-Mosul	v	Al-Minaa	Erbil
18:00 UTC+3				Stadium: Franso Hariri Stadium

11 December 2026 17	Al-Karkh	v	Al-Minaa	Baghdad
18:00 UTC+3				Stadium: Sharar Haidar Stadium

25 December 2026 18	Al-Minaa	v	Al-Jolan	Basra
20:30 UTC+3				Stadium: Al-Minaa Olympic Stadium

28 December 2026 19	Al-Minaa	v	Al-Shorta	Basra
20:30 UTC+3				Stadium: Al-Minaa Olympic Stadium

1 January 2027 20	Al-Minaa	v	Al-Zawraa	Basra
18:00 UTC+3				Stadium: Al-Minaa Olympic Stadium

5 February 2027 21	Al-Gharraf	v	Al-Minaa	Dhi Qar
18:00 UTC+3				Stadium: Al-Nasiriya International Stadium

12 February 2027 22	Al-Naft	v	Al-Minaa	Baghdad
18:00 UTC+3				Stadium: Sharar Haidar Stadium

19 February 2027 23	Zakho	v	Al-Minaa	Duhok
18:00 UTC+3				Stadium: Zakho International Stadium

26 February 2027 24	Al-Minaa	v	Ghaz Al-Shamal	Basra
18:00 UTC+3				Stadium: Al-Minaa Olympic Stadium

5 March 2027 25	Al-Minaa	v	Erbil	Basra
20:30 UTC+3				Stadium: Al-Minaa Olympic Stadium

12 March 2027 26	Al-Karma	v	Al-Minaa	Al-Anbar
17:00 UTC+3				Stadium: Al-Ramadi Stadium

19 March 2027 27	Al-Minaa	v	Newroz	Basra
17:00 UTC+3				Stadium: Al-Minaa Olympic Stadium

2 April 2027 28	Al-Minaa	v	Diyala	Basra
17:00 UTC+3				Stadium: Al-Minaa Olympic Stadium

5 April 2027 29	Naft Maysan	v	Al-Minaa	Maysan
18:00 UTC+3				Stadium: Maysan Olympic Stadium

9 April 2027 30	Duhok	v	Al-Minaa	Duhok
18:00 UTC+3				Stadium: Duhok Stadium

16 April 2027 31	Al-Minaa	v	Al-Karkh	Basra
18:00 UTC+3				Stadium: Al-Minaa Olympic Stadium

19 April 2027 32	Al-Minaa	v	Al-Talaba	Basra
18:00 UTC+3				Stadium: Al-Minaa Olympic Stadium

23 April 2027 33	Al-Shorta	v	Al-Minaa	Baghdad
18:00 UTC+3				Stadium: Al-Shorta Stadium

30 April 2027 34	Karbala	v	Al-Minaa	Karbala
18:00 UTC+3				Stadium: Karbala International Stadium

7 May 2027 35	Al-Minaa	v	Al-Mosul	Basra
18:00 UTC+3				Stadium: Al-Minaa Olympic Stadium

17 May 2027 36	Al-Minaa	v	Al-Kahrabaa	Basra
18:00 UTC+3				Stadium: Al-Minaa Olympic Stadium

21 May 2027 37	Al-Jolan	v	Al-Minaa	Al-Anbar
18:00 UTC+3				Stadium: Al-Jolan Stadium

28 May 2027 36	Al-Minaa	v	Al-Quwa Al-Jawiya	Basra
18:00 UTC+3				Stadium: Al-Minaa Olympic Stadium

== Squad statistics ==
As of 26 August 2026

No.	Pos.	Nat.	Name	League			FA Cup			Total			Discipline		
No.	Pos.	Nat.	Name	App	Gls	Ass	App	Gls	Ass	App	Gls	Ass	Yellow card	Second yellow card	Red card
1	GK	(Iraq)	Abed Saleem	3	0	0	0	0	0	3	0	0	0	0	0
3	MF	(Angola)	Pneu Flávio	0+3	1	1	0	0	0	0+3	1	1	0	0	0
4	DF	(Iraq)	Saad Natiq	3	0	0	0	0	0	3	0	0	0	0	0
5	DF	(Tunisia)	Malek Miladi	3	0	0	0	0	0	3	0	0	1	0	0
6	MF	(Iraq)	Haider Salem	0+3	0	0	0	0	0	0+3	0	0	0	0	0
7	MF	(Iraq)	Mohammed Saleh	3	0	0	0	0	0	3	0	0	0	0	0
9	FW	(Syria)	Yassin Samia	3	1	0	0	0	0	3	1	0	0	0	0
10	MF	(Iraq)	Karrar Jaafar	1+2	1	0	0	0	0	1+2	1	0	0	0	0
12	GK	(Iraq)	Ridha Abdulaziz	0	0	0	0	0	0	0	0	0	0	0	0
15	DF	(Iraq)	Hassan Ali Barhi	0	0	0	0	0	0	0	0	0	0	0	0
18	MF	(Armenia)	Solomon Udo	0+2	0	0	0	0	0	0+2	0	0	0	0	0
20	MF	(Tunisia)	Houssem Habbassi	3	0	1	0	0	0	3	0	1	0	0	0
23	FW	(Iraq)	Aymen Luay	0+1	0	0	0	0	0	0+1	0	0	0	0	0
24	DF	(Iraq)	Faisal Jassim	2	0	0	0	0	0	2	0	0	0	0	0
25	MF	(Iraq)	Abdulrazzaq Qasim	3	1	1	0	0	0	3	1	1	1	0	0
28	DF	(Iraq)	Ahmed Abdul-Hussein	1+2	1	0	0	0	0	1+2	1	0	1	0	0
29	FW	(Iraq)	Mohammed Dawood	2+1	0	0	0	0	0	2+1	0	0	1	0	0
30	MF	(Syria)	Fahd Youssef	3	0	1	0	0	0	3	0	1	1	0	0
33	GK	(Iraq)	Abdullah Ghazi	0	0	0	0	0	0	0	0	0	0	0	0
70	DF	(Syria)	Khaled Kourdoghli	3	0	0	0	0	0	3	0	0	0	0	0
77	DF	(Iraq)	Rasool Fadhil	0+1	0	0	0	0	0	0+1	0	0	0	0	0
