= 2025–26 Al-Mina'a SC season =

Al-Mina'a SC
2025–26 season
- Chairman: Farhan Al-Farttousi
- Manager: Luay Salah (until 22 February); Hussein Abdul-Wahid (from 27 February)
- Ground: Al-Minaa Olympic Stadium; Al-Fayhaa Stadium
- Iraq Stars League: 7th
- FA Cup: Round of 16
- Top goalscorer: League: Ahamad Azzawi (3); All: Ahamad Azzawi (4)
Home colours	Away colours

The 2025–26 season will be Al-Minaa's third season in the newly-formed Iraq Stars League, and their 49th season in the top division of Iraq football.

== Review ==
=== Background ===
The club has been suffering from administrative instability for years. On 21 January 2025, the Iraqi Olympic Committee formed an interim administration for the club for the seventh time, in preparation for holding elections to appoint administrative body. This situation has significantly impacted the team's performance in recent seasons, as the team finished sixteenth in the league the previous season and narrowly avoided relegation. On 10 September 2025, elections were held to select a new administrative body under the supervision of a committee formed by the Iraqi Olympic Committee. Ten members were elected to form the administrative body after a period of tensions, failures, legal complaints, and personal conflicts.

On 22 July 2025, Luay Salah was appointed as the team's manager, along with his assistant staff consisting of Halgurd Mulla Mohammed and Ous Ibrahim, while Amer Abdul-Wahab continued as the goalkeeper coach.

=== Summer transfer window ===
The Iraq Stars League's summer transfer window will run from 20 July to 20 September 2025, following a timing change by the Iraqi Football Association. Two months before the transfer window opened, the club's management renewed the contract of Congolese professional player Tuisila Kisinda for an additional season. On 30 June, the club's management decided to release a number of players due to their poor technical level, they're: Amir Ahmed, Hameed Ali Hameed, Jaafar Shenaishil, Sajjad Alaa, and Mohammed Ghaleb. Four players' contracts also expired and the club was unable to renew them due to unforeseen circumstances, they're: Waziri Shentembo, Gerald Takwara, Ousseynou Thioune and André Alsanati. On 21 July, the contract of the Gabonese midfielder Clench Loufilou was renewed. On 31 July, defensive midfielder Haider Salem has moved to Amanat Baghdad, and Al-Minaa officially announced the signing of Tunisian defender Dhiaeddine Jouini for one season. As well as the signing of Moroccan winger Reda Majji. On 6 August the club announced the signing of Nigerian striker Iyayi Atiemwen. On 7 August, the club announced its contract with the right-back Haider Ahmed and striker Mahmoud Khalil, and the next day he signed the right-back, Faisal Jassim, who played in a previous period for the team. On 9 August, the club announced its contract with goalkeeper Ali Ibadi and midfielder Ahmed Mahmoud, nicknamed the Japanese. On the same day, the club announced the signing of defensive midfielder Ali Al-Sajjad Sabah. On 16 August, the club announced the signing of midfielder Murtadha Ali Malas. On the same day, Hamid Abdulla left the team without a known reason, with one more season remaining on his contract with the club. On 18 August, Al-Minaa announced the departure of its striker and team captain, Alaa Abdul-Zahra, confirming that his contract would not be renewed. Meanwhile, the club announced the signing of Jordanian striker Mohammad Aburiziq, nicknamed Pogba. On 19 August, striker Salem Ahmed's contract was not renewed and moved to Al-Shorta. On 20 August, defender Hussein Amer moved to Al-Talaba, while goalkeeper Abed Saleem and defender Mujtaba Ali renewed their contracts with club, and the club announced the signing of defender Najm Shwan and goalkeeper Abdullah Ghazi. On 23 August, the club announced the signing of striker Mohammed Nassif from Al-Quwa Al-Jawiya. Later, defender Gerald Takwara moved to Al Ittihad Misurata.

=== Pre-season ===
At its pre-season camp in Sousse, Tunisia, Al-Minaa played its first match on 25 August 2025, against CS M'saken. The match ended 1–0 after Iyayi Atiemwen scored the only goal for Al-Minaa. On 28 August, Al-Minaa played their second friendly match against ES Radès, defeating them 3–0. Mohannad Abdul-Raheem, Reda Majji, and Hassan Hamed scored the goals. In the third friendly match, Al-Minaa faced fellow Iraq Stars League side Al-Karma, and lost 3–1. In the fourth and final match of the pre-season camp, on 3 September, Al-Minaa played JS Kairouan, winning 2–1, with Mujtaba Ali and Reda Majji scoring the goals. The team thus concluded its preparations for the league and returned to Basra.

=== Stadium ===
On 11 September 2025, the Al-Minaa media manager confirmed that the Al-Minaa Olympic Stadium is not prepared to host the Iraqi Stars League matches for the new season, indicating that the club management is seeking to adopt the Al-Fayhaa Stadium as a temporary stadium for the team.

=== September ===

Starting XI (4–4–2 formation) for the Iraq Stars League away match against Naft Maysan on 14 September 2025

Salah's side kicked off their Iraq Stars League campaign with a 3–1 win over Naft Maysan at away on 14 September. Iyayi Atiemwen scored his first goal in the 7th minute after an assist from Aburiziq. Atiemwen then assisted Majji in the 60th minute, who put it into the net. Atiemwen then scored his second goal in the 65th minute with an individual effort after stealing the ball from an opposing defender. The home team reduced the score in the 85th minute from a penalty kick that Daouda Diémé successfully converted after the referee consulted VAR. Al-Minaa suffered their first defeat of the season, losing 1–3 to Erbil at Al-Fayhaa Stadium. Mustafa Qabeel took advantage of two silly mistakes, one from defender Mujtaba Ali and the other from goalkeeper Ali Ibadi, to score a brace, while Sherzod Temirov managed to score the third goal for the visiting team while the defenders were distracted. The referee Mohanad Qasim awarded a penalty kick to Al-Minaa, from which Abbas Yas scored Al-Minaa's only goal. In the 83rd minute, Mujtaba Ali was sent off because of his reckless entry on Humam Tariq's foot. The team had just lost Tunisian defender Dhiaeddine Jouini to a back injury during training. He is expected to be sidelined for at least four months. The incident has been a major disappointment for the technical staff, given the importance of the player. Al-Minaa suffered their second defeat of the season, losing 0–1 to Al-Quwa Al-Jawiya at Al-Madina Stadium on 27 September. Al-Hareth Hatam managed to score an early, surprising goal in the fifth minute, and referee Yousef Saeed awarded a penalty kick to the home team, which was executed by Saad Abdul-Amir in the 21st minute, but Abed Saleem was able to save it. In the 75th minute, player Najm Shwan was sent off, and the match continued with great intensity, ending with a score of 1–0. The TV program, which evaluates referees' decisions, confirmed that the decision to send off Najm Shwan was a wrong one.

=== October ===
On 5 October, Al-Minaa secured their first home victory of the season, defeating Al-Najaf 4–2 at the Al-Fayhaa Stadium. Muslim Mousa scored the first goal, as Mohannad Abdul-Raheem provided him with an assist, and Abdul-Raheem returned to score a brace, the first with an assist from Mohammad Aburiziq, who provided a second assist for Ahamad Azzawi, from which he scored a goal. The visitors returned in the last four minutes of the match to score two goals. On 6 October, the club announced the signing of Guinean defender Ibrahima Conté. On 9 October, the draw for the Iraq FA Cup was held for the round of 32 matches, and the draw pitted Al-Minaa against Naft Al-Wasat in a home match. On 13 October, during the international break, Al-Minaa played Al-Gharraf in a warm-up match for the FA Cup, which ended in a 1–1 draw. Abdul-Raheem scored for Al-Minaa in the second half. On 17 October, Al-Minaa played their first FA Cup match against Naft Al-Wasat, which ended in a 2–1 victory. Azzawi and Aburiziq scored for Al-Minaa, while Alaa Mehaisen scored for the visiting team. On 26 October, Al-Minaa faced Diyala at their new stadium. Al-Minaa were the better side for the first twenty minutes, but Diyala quickly regrouped and took control of midfield. A goal scored by Mohannad Abdul-Raheem in the fourth minute of first-half stoppage time was disallowed by the referee due to a foul against Abdul-Raheem, and the match ended in a goalless draw. The management of Al-Minaa Club submitted an official objection against Diyala team due to legal violations, as the team list was changed four times during the match, and demanded that the Disciplinary and Appeals Committees of the Iraqi Football Association follow up on the objection and apply the legal regulations. On 31 October, Al-Minaa faced Al-Qasim at Al-Fayhaa Stadium, and managed to defeat them with a score of 2–0, with Azzawi scoring a brace.

=== November ===
On 6 November, the club announced the signing of midfielder Ali Mohsin. On 7 November, Al-Minaa faced Masafi Al-Wasat at their home ground in Baghdad in FA Cup. The match ended in a 1–1 draw. The home team scored in the 69th minute by Ali Mohammed Sheer, and Aburiziq scored for Al-Minaa in the final minutes of extra time. Al-Minaa managed to win on penalties, with the goalkeeper Abed Saleem saving the final kick, resulting in a 5–4 victory. On 19 November, the Iraqi Football Association's disciplinary committee accepted the club's complaint against Diyala, and declared Al-Minaa the winner with a score of 3–0 in the fifth round match of the league, thus bringing the team's tally to 12 points in third place. On 22 November, Al-Minaa suffered a 2-0 defeat against Al-Karma in a match played that evening at Al-Ramadi Stadium, as part of the seventh round of the Iraq Stars League. Al-Karma took the lead through Moammal Abdul-Ridha in the 19th minute of the first half, which ended with Al-Karma ahead. The second half was no better than the first, and Al-Minaa players tried to equalize until the 86th minute when Al-Karma's Karrar Amer scored an own goal. The referee initially disallowed the goal but then consulted VAR, awarding a penalty against Al-Minaa. Ayman Hussein converted the penalty in the fourth minute of stoppage time, securing a 2–0 victory for Al-Karma. Refereeing experts on most television programs confirmed that canceling Al-Minaa’s goal was a wrong decision by referee Ahmed Kadhim, and that awarding a penalty kick to Al-Karma was also wrong. The referees committee, through a statement by the vice president of the referees committee on a television program, acknowledged the mistakes of referee Ahmed Kadhim in this match, as his decisions were unfair, as he canceled a valid goal for Al-Minaa, and awarded a phantom penalty kick to Al-Karma, and the committee punished him with suspension without announcing it.

== First-team squad ==
As of 5 October 2025

No.	Name	Nat.	Position(s)	Date of birth (age)	Signed from	Apps	Goals
Goalkeepers
1	Abed Saleem	(Iraq)	GK	14 Oct 1995 (age 31)	Al-Karkh	39	0
22	Ali Ibadi	(Iraq)	GK	16 Feb 2000 (age 26)	Al-Quwa Al-Jawiya	1	0
30	Abdullah Ghazi	(Iraq)	GK	1 Jan 1998 (age 28)	Al-Samawa	0	0
Defenders
2	Mohammed Ghaleb	(Iraq)	CB	26 Sep 2005 (age 21)	Al-Minaa Academy	27	0
3	Ibrahima Conté	(Guinea)	CB	3 Apr 1996 (age 30)	UTA Arad	0	0
4	Mujtaba Ali	(Iraq)	CB / RB / LB	4 Oct 2002 (age 24)	Al-Minaa Academy	50	3
16	Najm Shwan	(Iraq)	CB / DM	9 Jul 1997 (age 29)	Duhok	3	0
17	Muslim Mousa	(Iraq)	LB / LWB	11 Mar 2005 (age 21)	Al-Minaa Academy	61	5
21	Haider Ahmed	(Iraq)	RB / RWB	2 Feb 1996 (age 30)	Erbil	3	0
25	Faisal Jassim	(Iraq)	RB / CB	1 Oct 1991 (age 35)	Al-Shorta	24	0
33	Abbas Yas	(Iraq)	LB / CB / DM	3 Jul 2003 (age 23)	Al-Minaa Academy	154	5
Midfielders
5	Ali Mohsin	(Iraq)	DM / CM	31 Jan 2000 (age 26)	Duhok	0	0
15	Ali Al-Sajjad Sabah	(Iraq)	DM / CM	15 Jan 2002 (age 24)	Diyala	1	0
20	Ahamad Azzawi	(Iraq)	AM	1 Nov 1994 (age 32)	Newroz	4	1
79	Clech Loufilou	(Gabon)	DM / CM	12 Apr 1999 (age 27)	Sur	39	0
24	Murtadha Ali Malas	(Iraq)	CM	20 Dec 1994 (age 31)	Al-Najaf	0	0
Forwards
7	Reda Majji	(Morocco)	RW / LW	6 Jan 2000 (age 26)	Difaâ El Jadidi	4	1
8	Mahmoud Khalil	(Iraq)	ST / AM	12 Jan 1995 (age 31)	Al-Karma	3	0
9	Mohammad Aburiziq	(Jordan)	ST	1 Feb 1999 (age 27)	Al-Wehdat	4	0
10	Mohannad Abdul-Raheem	(Iraq)	ST / RW / AM	22 Sep 1993 (age 33)	Al-Quwa Al-Jawiya	32	7
11	Karrar Jaafar	(Iraq)	LW / ST / RW	26 Apr 2006 (age 20)	Al-Minaa Academy	84	15
26	Mohammed Nassif	(Iraq)	ST	25 Aug 1997 (age 29)	Al-Quwa Al-Jawiya	0	0
29	Tuisila Kisinda	(Democratic Republic of the Congo)	RW / RWB	20 Dec 1999 (age 26)	RS Berkane	40	2
88	Iyayi Atiemwen	(Nigeria)	LW / ST	24 Jan 1996 (age 30)	Al-Najaf	4	2
Players transferred out during this season
14	Dhiaeddine Jouini	(Tunisia)	CB	1 Mar 1996 (age 30)	US Monastir	1	0

== New contracts and transfers ==
=== New contracts ===
Date	No.	Pos.	Name	Ref.
26 May 2025	29	RW	(Democratic Republic of the Congo) Tuisila Kisinda	
21 July 2025	79	DM	(Gabon) Clench Loufilou	
19 August 2025	1	GK	(Iraq) Abed Saleem	
19 August 2025	4	CB	(Iraq) Mujtaba Ali	

=== Transfers in ===
Date	No.	Pos.	Name	From	Fee	Ref.
31 July 2025	14	CB	(Tunisia) Dhiaeddine Jouini	(Tunisia) US Monastir	Free transfer	
31 July 2025	7	RW	(Morocco) Reda Majji	(Morocco) Difaâ El Jadidi	Free transfer	
6 August 2025	88	LW	(Nigeria) Iyayi Atiemwen	(Iraq) Al-Najaf	Free transfer	
7 August 2025	21	RB	(Iraq) Haider Ahmed	(Iraq) Erbil	Free transfer	
7 August 2025	8	ST	(Iraq) Mahmoud Khalil	(Iraq) Al-Karma	Free transfer	
8 August 2025	25	RB	(Iraq) Faisal Jassim	(Iraq) Al-Shorta	Free transfer	
9 August 2025	22	GK	(Iraq) Ali Ibadi	(Iraq) Al-Quwa Al-Jawiya	Free transfer	
9 August 2025	20	AM	(Iraq) Ahamad Azzawi	(Iraq) Newroz	Free transfer	
9 August 2025	15	DM	(Iraq) Ali Al-Sajjad Sabah	(Iraq) Diyala	Free transfer	
16 August 2025	24	CM	(Iraq) Murtadha Ali Malas	(Iraq) Al-Najaf	Free transfer	
18 August 2025	9	ST	(Jordan) Mohammad Aburiziq	(Jordan) Al-Wehdat	Free transfer	
20 August 2025	16	CB	(Iraq) Najm Shwan	(Iraq) Duhok	Free transfer	
20 August 2025	30	GK	(Iraq) Abdullah Ghazi	(Iraq) Al-Samawa	Free transfer	
23 August 2025	26	ST	(Iraq) Mohammed Nassif	(Iraq) Al-Quwa Al-Jawiya	Free transfer	
6 October 2025	3	CB	(Guinea) Ibrahima Conté	(Romania) UTA Arad	Free transfer	
6 November 2025	5	DM	(Iraq) Ali Mohsin	(Iraq) Duhok	Free transfer	

=== Transfers out ===
Date	No.	Pos.	Name	To	Fee	Ref.
30 June 2025	90	ST	(Tanzania) Waziri Shentembo	Unattached	Released	
10 July 2025	21	GK	(Iraq) Abbas Karim	(Iraq) Al-Shorta	End of loan	
23 July 2025	26	RW	(Iraq) Sajjad Alaa	(Saudi Arabia) Najran	Free transfer	
28 July 2025	15	CM	(Yemen) Osama Anbar	Unattached	Released	
29 July 2025	22	GK	(Iraq) Jaafar Shenaishil	(Iraq) Al-Karkh	Free transfer	
31 July 2025	6	DM	(Iraq) Haider Salem	(Iraq) Amanat Baghdad	Free transfer	
31 July 2025	20	RW	(Iraq) André Alsanati	(Iraq) Duhok	Free transfer	
3 August 2025	18	RB	(Iraq) Hameed Ali Hameed	(Iraq) Zakho	Free transfer	
3 August 2025	25	DM	(Iraq) Amir Ahmed	(Iraq) Al-Hudood	Free transfer	
16 August 2025	19	LW	(Iraq) Hamid Abdulla	Unattached	Released	
18 August 2025	10	ST	(Iraq) Alaa Abdul-Zahra	(Iraq) Al-Talaba	Free transfer	
19 August 2025	9	ST	(Iraq) Salem Ahmed	(Iraq) Al-Shorta	Free transfer	
20 August 2025	5	CB	(Iraq) Hussein Amer	(Iraq) Al-Talaba	Free transfer	
10 September 2025	27	DM	(Senegal) Ousseynou Thioune	(Saudi Arabia) Al-Jubail	Free transfer	
18 September 2025	31	CB	(Zimbabwe) Gerald Takwara	(Libya) Al Ittihad Misurata	Free transfer	
28 September 2025	14	CB	(Tunisia) Dhiaeddine Jouini	Unattached	Contract termination	

== Personnel ==
=== Technical staff ===
Position	Name
Manager	(Iraq) Luay Salah
Assistant coach	(Iraq) Halgurd Mulla Mohammed (Iraq) Ous Ibrahim
Goalkeeping coach	(Iraq) Amer Abdul-Wahab
Fitness coach	(Egypt) Mohammed Mustafa Ibrahim
Performance Analyst	(Iraq) Khalid Hussein Allas (Iraq) Hussam Rasim Kokaz
Team supervisor	(Iraq) Bashar Hadi Ahmed

== Kits ==
Adidas were announced as Al-Minaa's kit supplier as of the start of the last season.

Supplier: Adidas/ Sponsor: Basra Gateway Terminal

Home	Home alt.	Away	Goalkeeper^{1}	Goalkeeper^{2}

Kits using in FA Cup matches
Home^{2}	Goalkeeper^{3}

== Pre-season and friendlies ==
On 20 August 2025, Al-Minaa announced that it would travel to Sousse, Tunisia the following day for 15 days to play four friendlies against Tunisian and Iraqi teams, without specifying which ones.

17 Aug 2025 Friendly	Al-Minaa (Iraq)	0–0	(Iraq) Masafi Al-Janoob	Basra, Iraq
17:00 UTC+3				Stadium: Al-Fayhaa Stadium

25 Aug 2025 Friendly	Al-Minaa (Iraq)	1–0	(Tunisia) CS M'saken	Sousse, Tunisia
17:00 UTC+3	Atiemwen	Report		Stadium: El Kantaoui Stadium

28 Aug 2025 Friendly	Al-Minaa (Iraq)	3–0	(Tunisia) ES Radès	Sousse, Tunisia
19:00 UTC+3	Abdul-Raheem; Majji; Hamed	Report		Stadium: El Kantaoui Stadium

30 Aug 2025 Friendly	Al-Minaa (Iraq)	1–3	(Iraq) Al-Karma	Sousse, Tunisia
18:30 UTC+3	Hamed	Report	Oumarou; El-Ani; Mohsin	Stadium: El Kantaoui Stadium

3 Sep 2025 Friendly	Al-Minaa (Iraq)	2–1	(Tunisia) JS Kairouan	Sousse, Tunisia
19:00 UTC+3	Ali; Majji	Report	Goal	Stadium: El Kantaoui Stadium

8 Sep 2025 Friendly	Al-Minaa (Iraq)	0–1	(Iraq) Naft Al-Basra	Basra, Iraq
17:00 UTC+3			Goal	Stadium: Al-Fayhaa Stadium

13 Oct 2025 Friendly	Al-Gharraf (Iraq)	1–1	(Iraq) Al-Minaa	Dhi Qar, Iraq
16:30 UTC+3	Zamel 10'	Report	Abdul-Raheem	Stadium: Al-Nasiriya International Stadium

2 Nov 2025 Friendly	Al-Minaa (Iraq)	0–1	(Iraq) Al-Qurna	Basra, Iraq
16:30 UTC+3		Report	Karim	Stadium: Al-Fayhaa Stadium

== Competitions ==
=== Overview ===
Competition	First match	Last match	Starting round	Record							
Competition	First match	Last match	Starting round	Pld	W	D	L	GF	GA	GD	Win %
Iraq Stars League	14 September 2025	28 May 2026	Matchday 1	8	4	0	4	13	11	+2	50.00
FA Cup	17 October 2025	TBD	First round	2	1	1	0	3	2	+1	50.00
Total				10	5	1	4	16	13	+3	50.00

Last updated: 28 December 2025
Source: Competitions

=== League table ===
Pos	Team	Pld	W	D	L	GF	GA	GD	Pts
13	Al-Mosul	38	11	14	13	46	49	−3	47
14	Al-Gharraf	38	11	11	16	40	43	−3	44
15	Al-Minaa	38	10	12	16	41	47	−6	42 (Note: Al-Minaa finished ahead of Naft Maysan on head-to-head goal difference: Naft Maysan 1–3 Al-Minaa, Al-Minaa 0–1 Naft Maysan.)
16	Naft Maysan	38	11	9	18	46	58	−12	42
17	Al-Kahrabaa	38	12	5	21	47	56	−9	41

Source: SofaScore
Rules for classification: 1) Points; 2) Head-to-head points; 3) Head-to-head goal difference; 4) Goal difference; 5) Number of goals scored; 6) Number of wins.

==== Summary table ====
Overall								Home						Away					
Pld	W	D	L	GF	GA	GD	Pts	W	D	L	GF	GA	GD	W	D	L	GF	GA	GD
8	4	0	4	13	11	+2	12	2	0	1	7	5	+2	2	0	3	6	6	0

Last updated: 28 December 2025.
Source: Goalzz.com

==== Results by matchday ====
Matchday	1	2	3	4	5	6	7	8
Ground	A	H	A	H	A	H	A	A
Result	W	L	L	W	W	W	L	L
Position	2	9	12	11	10	3	7	10

Updated to match(es) played on 28 December 2025. Source: Goalzz.com
A = Away; H = Home; W = Win; D = Draw; L = Loss; P = Postponed

==== Matches ====
The league fixtures were announced on 7 September 2025.

Win Draw Loss Fixtures

14 September 2025 1	Naft Maysan	1–3	Al-Minaa	Maysan
18:00 UTC+3	Lateef (yellow card) 30'; Mohammed (yellow card) 34'; Tall (yellow card) 53'; Diémé 85' (pen.); Abdul-Karim (yellow card) 90+4'	Report	Atiemwen 7', 65', (yellow card) 27'; Khalil (yellow card) 51'; Majji 60'	Stadium: Maysan Olympic Stadium; Referee: Mohammed Salah

20 September 2025 2	Al-Minaa	1–3	Erbil	Basra
20:30 UTC+3	Yas 81' (pen.); Ali (red card) 83'	Report	Qabeel 25', 36'; Temirov 59'; Junior (yellow card) 64'; Ozer (yellow card) 90'; Zaddem (yellow card) 90+3'	Stadium: Al-Fayhaa Stadium; Referee: Mohanad Qasim

27 September 2025 3	Al-Quwa Al-Jawiya	1–0	Al-Minaa	Baghdad
18:00 UTC+3	Hatam 5'; Abdul-Amir (yellow card) 21', (penalty missed) 53'; Mokeddem (yellow card) 40'; Adel (yellow card) 44'; Salih (yellow card) 63'	Report	Azzawi (yellow card) 34'; Shwan (yellow card) 49' (yellow-red card) 75'; Ghaleb (yellow card) 90+6'	Stadium: Al-Madina Stadium; Referee: Yousef Saeed

5 October 2025 4	Al-Minaa	4–2	Al-Najaf	Basra
20:30 UTC+3	Mousa 6'; Abdul-Raheem 18', 46'; Azzawi 25'; Sabah (yellow card) 84'; Loufilou (yellow card) 89'	Report	Niang (yellow card) 70'; Panom 90+1'; Sioud 90+5'	Stadium: Al-Fayhaa Stadium; Referee: Hamed Ali

26 October 2025 5	Diyala	0–3	Al-Minaa	Diyala
18:00 UTC+3	Salhi (yellow card) 50'; Malik (yellow card) 80'	Report		Stadium: Diyala Stadium; Referee: Zaid Thamir
Note: Al-Minaa was considered the winner with a score of 3–0, due to Diyala tampering with the starting lineup after the start of the match, which ended in a goalless draw.

31 October 2025 6	Al-Minaa	2–0	Al-Qasim	Basra
18:00 UTC+3	Azzawi 23', 64'; Kisinda (yellow card) 89'; Atiemwen (yellow card) 90+1'	Report	Abdul-Wahid (yellow card) 23'; Dakhel (yellow card) 34'	Stadium: Al-Fayhaa Stadium; Referee: Mohanad Qasim

22 November 2025 7	Al-Karma	2–0	Al-Minaa	Al-Anbar
17:00 UTC+3	Abdul-Ridha 19'; Khudhair (yellow card) 24'; Hussein (yellow card) 41', (goal) 90+4' (pen.)	Report	Kisinda (yellow card) 52'; Ahmed (yellow card) 86'	Stadium: Al-Ramadi Stadium; Referee: Ahmed Kadhim

28 December 2025 8	Al-Zawraa	2–0	Al-Minaa	Baghdad
18:00 UTC+3	Abdul-Karim 38', 79', (yellow card) 24'; Nasib (yellow card) 85'	Report	Ibadi (yellow card) 32'	Stadium: Al-Zawraa Stadium; Referee: Yousef Saeed

9	Al-Minaa	v	Newroz	Basra
				Stadium: Al-Fayhaa Stadium

10	Al-Minaa	v	Al-Kahrabaa	Basra
				Stadium: Al-Fayhaa Stadium

11	Duhok	v	Al-Minaa	Duhok
				Stadium: Duhok Stadium

12	Al-Minaa	v	Al-Karkh	Basra
				Stadium: Al-Fayhaa Stadium

13	Al-Talaba	v	Al-Minaa	Baghdad
				Stadium: Al-Madina Stadium

14	Al-Minaa	v	Al-Shorta	Basra
				Stadium: Al-Fayhaa Stadium

15	Al-Minaa	v	Al-Naft	Basra
				Stadium: Al-Fayhaa Stadium

16	Zakho	v	Al-Minaa	Duhok
				Stadium: Zakho International Stadium

17	Amanat Baghdad	v	Al-Minaa	Baghdad
				Stadium: Al-Madina Stadium

18	Al-Minaa	v	Al-Gharraf	Basra
				Stadium: Al-Fayhaa Stadium

19	Al-Mosul	v	Al-Minaa	Duhok
				Stadium: Duhok Stadium

20	Al-Minaa	v	Al-Karma	Basra
				Stadium: Al-Fayhaa Stadium

21	Al-Najaf	v	Al-Minaa	Najaf
				Stadium: Al-Najaf International Stadium

22	Erbil	v	Al-Minaa	Erbil
				Stadium: Franso Hariri Stadium

23	Al-Minaa	v	Diyala	Basra
				Stadium: Al-Fayhaa Stadium

24	Al-Minaa	v	Duhok	Basra
				Stadium: Al-Fayhaa Stadium

25	Al-Karkh	v	Al-Minaa	Baghdad
				Stadium: Sharar Haidar Stadium

26	Al-Minaa	v	Naft Maysan	Basra
				Stadium: Al-Fayhaa Stadium

27	Al-Kahrabaa	v	Al-Minaa	Baghdad
				Stadium: Al-Zawraa Stadium

28	Newroz	v	Al-Minaa	Sulaymaniyah
				Stadium: Newroz International Stadium

29	Al-Minaa	v	Zakho	Basra
				Stadium: Al-Fayhaa Stadium

30	Al-Minaa	v	Amanat Baghdad	Basra
				Stadium: Al-Fayhaa Stadium

31	Al-Gharraf	v	Al-Minaa	Dhi Qar
				Stadium: Al-Nasiriya International Stadium

32	Al-Minaa	v	Al-Quwa Al-Jawiya	Basra
				Stadium: Al-Fayhaa Stadium

33	Al-Qasim	v	Al-Minaa	Wasit
				Stadium: Al-Kut Olympic Stadium

34	Al-Minaa	v	Al-Zawraa	Basra
				Stadium: Al-Minaa Olympic Stadium

35	Al-Naft	v	Al-Minaa	Baghdad
				Stadium: Sharar Haidar Stadium

36	Al-Minaa	v	Al-Mosul	Basra
				Stadium: Al-Minaa Olympic Stadium

37	Al-Minaa	v	Al-Talaba	Basra
				Stadium: Al-Minaa Olympic Stadium

38	Al-Shorta	v	Al-Minaa	Baghdad
				Stadium: Al-Shaab Stadium

=== FA Cup ===
17 October 2025 First round	Al-Minaa	2–1	Naft Al-Wasat	Basra
18:00 UTC+3	Azzawi 27'; Aburiziq 58'; Saleem (yellow card) 82'	Report	Mehaisen 60'; Mohsin (yellow card) 90+2'	Stadium: Al-Fayhaa Stadium; Referee: Mohammed Kamel

7 November 2025 Second round	Masafi Al-Wasat	1–1 (4–5 p)	Al-Minaa	Baghdad
15:00 UTC+3	Karim (yellow card) 14'; Mohammed (yellow card) 59'; Sheer 69'; Hadi (yellow card) 83'; Abbas (yellow card) 85'; Usengimana (red card) 90+3'	Report	Jaafar (yellow card) 89'; Shwan (yellow card) 90+1'; Aburiziq 90+6'	Stadium: Al-Masafi Stadium
	Penalties
	Sheer (penalty scored); Koné (penalty scored); Mahmood (penalty scored); Habeeb (penalty scored); Mawli (penalty missed)		(penalty scored) Nassif; (penalty scored) Jaafar; (penalty scored) Khalil; (penalty scored) Shwan; (penalty scored) Aburiziq

== Statistics ==
=== Appearances ===
Twenty-five players made their appearances for Al-Minaa's first team during the season.

Player^{#}: Player who was registered as an Al-Minaa U21, U19 or U17 player during the season.

Includes all competitions for senior teams.

As of 28 December 2025

2025–26 season
No.	Pos.	Player	IS League	FA Cup	total
1	GK	(Iraq) Abed Saleem	6	2	8
2	DF	(Iraq) Mohammed Ghaleb	4+1	1+1	5+2
4	DF	(Iraq) Mujtaba Ali	2+4	0	2+4
5	MF	(Iraq) Ali Mohsin	0+1	0	0+1
6	DF	(Iraq) Muqtada Haider^{#}	0	0+1	0+1
7	FW	(Morocco) Reda Majji	7+1	0+2	7+3
8	FW	(Iraq) Mahmoud Khalil	1+4	0+2	1+6
9	FW	(Jordan) Mohammad Aburiziq	7	2	9
10	FW	(Iraq) Mohannad Abdul-Raheem	4+4	2	6+4
11	FW	(Iraq) Karrar Jaafar	2+6	0+1	2+7
12	MF	(Iraq) Hassan Hamed	0+2	0	0+2
15	MF	(Iraq) Ali Al-Sajjad Sabah	0+2	0	0+2
16	MF	(Iraq) Najm Shwan	7	2	9
17	DF	(Iraq) Muslim Mousa	4	0	4
20	MF	(Iraq) Ahamad Azzawi	8	2	18
21	DF	(Iraq) Haider Ahmed	5+1	1	6+1
22	GK	(Iraq) Ali Ibadi	2	0	2
24	MF	(Iraq) Murtadha Ali Malas	2+1	0	2+1
25	FW	(Iraq) Faisal Jassim	6	2	8
26	FW	(Iraq) Mohammed Nassif	1	0+2	1+2
29	FW	(Democratic Republic of the Congo) Tuisila Kisinda	4+4	2	6+4
33	DF	(Iraq) Abbas Yas	4+4	2	6+4
79	MF	(Gabon) Clench Loufilou	5+2	2	7+2
88	FW	(Nigeria) Iyayi Atiemwen	6+2	2	8+2
Players who departed the club permanently but featured this season
14	DF	(Tunisia) Dhiaeddine Jouini	1	0	1

=== Goalscorers ===
The following seven players scored for Al-Minaa's first team during the season.

Includes all competitions for senior teams. The list is sorted by squad number when season-total goals are equal. Players with no goals not included in the list.

As of 28 December 2025

2025–26 season
Rank	No.	Pos	Nat	Name	IS League	FA Cup	Total
1	20	MF	(Iraq)	Ahamad Azzawi	3	1	4
2	9	FW	(Jordan)	Mohammad Aburiziq	0	2	2
2	10	FW	(Iraq)	Mohannad Abdul-Raheem	2	0	2
2	88	FW	(Nigeria)	Iyayi Atiemwen	2	0	2
3	7	FW	(Morocco)	Reda Majji	1	0	1
3	17	DF	(Iraq)	Muslim Mousa	1	0	1
3	33	DF	(Iraq)	Abbas Yas	1	0	1
Own goals					0	0	0
TOTALS					10	3	13

=== Assists ===
The following four players registered their assists for Al-Minaa's first team during the season.

Includes all competitions for senior teams. The list is sorted by squad number when season-total assists are equal. Players with no assists not included in the list.

As of 28 December 2025

2025–26 season
Rank	No.	Pos	Nat	Name	IS League	FA Cup	Total
1	9	FW	(Jordan)	Mohammad Aburiziq	3	0	3
2	10	FW	(Iraq)	Mohannad Abdul-Raheem	1	1	2
3	29	MF	(Democratic Republic of the Congo)	Tuisila Kisinda	1	0	1
3	88	FW	(Nigeria)	Iyayi Atiemwen	1	0	1
TOTALS					6	1	7

=== Disciplinary record ===
Includes all competitions for senior teams. The list is sorted by red cards, then yellow cards (and by squad number when total cards are equal). Players with no cards not included in the list.

As of 28 December 2025

Rk.	No.	Pos.	Player	IS League			FA Cup			Total		
Rk.	No.	Pos.	Player	Yellow card	Second yellow card	Red card	Yellow card	Second yellow card	Red card	Yellow card	Second yellow card	Red card
1	4	DF	(Iraq) Mujtaba Ali	0	0	1	0	0	0	0	0	1
2	16	DF	(Iraq) Najm Shwan	0	1	0	1	0	0	1	1	0
3	29	MF	(Democratic Republic of the Congo) Tuisila Kisinda	2	0	0	0	0	0	2	0	0
3	88	FW	(Nigeria) Iyayi Atiemwen	2	0	0	0	0	0	2	0	0
4	1	GK	(Iraq) Abed Saleem	0	0	0	1	0	0	1	0	0
4	2	DF	(Iraq) Mohammed Ghaleb	1	0	0	0	0	0	1	0	0
4	8	FW	(Iraq) Mahmoud Khalil	1	0	0	0	0	0	1	0	0
4	11	MF	(Iraq) Karrar Jaafar	0	0	0	1	0	0	1	0	0
4	15	MF	(Iraq) Ali Al-Sajjad Sabah	1	0	0	0	0	0	1	0	0
4	20	MF	(Iraq) Ahamad Azzawi	1	0	0	0	0	0	1	0	0
4	21	DF	(Iraq) Haider Ahmed	1	0	0	0	0	0	1	0	0
4	22	GK	(Iraq) Ali Ibadi	1	0	0	0	0	0	1	0	0
4	79	MF	(Gabon) Clech Loufilou	1	0	0	0	0	0	1	0	0
Total				11	1	1	3	0	0	14	1	1

=== Clean sheets ===
Goalkeepers with no clean sheets not included in the list.

As of 28 December 2025

Rank	Nat	No.	Name	IS League	FA Cup	Total
1	(Iraq)	1	Abed Saleem	2	0	2
2	(Iraq)	22	Ali Ibadi	0	0	0
2	(Iraq)	30	Abdullah Ghazi	0	0	0
TOTALS				2	0	2

=== Captains ===
Includes all competitions for senior teams. The list is sorted by squad number when season-total number of games where a player started as captain are equal. Players with no games started as captain not included in the list.

As of 28 December 2025

2025–26 season
Rk.	No.	Pos.	Nat	Player	IS League	FA Cup	Total
1	10	FW	(Iraq)	Mohannad Abdul-Raheem	4	2	6
2	1	GK	(Iraq)	Abed Saleem	2	0	2
3	25	DF	(Iraq)	Faisal Jassim	1	0	1
3	79	MF	(Gabon)	Clench Loufilou	1	0	1
TOTALS					8	2	10
