= Amer Abdul-Wahab Abdul-Hussein =

Iraqi footballer

Amer Abdul-Wahab
Personal information
- Full name: Amer Abdul-Wahab Abdul-Hussein
- Date of birth: 17 April 1969 (age 57)
- Place of birth: Basra, Iraq
- Position: Goalkeeper

Team information
- Current team: Al-Minaa (Goalkeeping coach)

Senior career*
Years	Team	Apps	(Gls)
1987–1991	Al-Minaa		
1991–1996	Al-Zawraa		
1996	Riada Wal Adab		
1996–1997	Al Ahed		
1997–1998	Racing		
1999–2002	Al-Zawraa		

International career
1994	Iraq U23		
1995–2001	Iraq	15	(0)
- * Club domestic league appearances and goals

Amer Abdul-Wahab (Arabic: عامر عبد الوهاب; born 17 April 1969) is an Iraqi former football goalkeeper who played for the Iraq in the 2000 Asian Cup. He also played professionally in the Lebanese Premier League. He currently works as a professional goalkeeper coach.

== International career ==
Abdul-Wahab made his international debut for Iraq against Thailand in the Nehru Cup on 14 March 1995 as a substitute, but his first full international appearance for Iraq in the starting lineup was against Lebanon on 23 May 2000.

== Managerial career ==
After retiring, Abdul-Wahab pursued a career as a professional goalkeeping coach, holding this position with the Iraq national football team, Apollon Limassol (Cyprus), Sharjah (UAE), Al Ain (UAE), Al-Zawraa (Iraq), and Al-Minaa (Iraq).

== Career statistics ==
=== International ===
As of match played 23 August 2001

Appearances and goals by national team and year
National team	Year	Apps	Goals
Iraq	1995	1	0
Iraq	2000	5	0
Iraq	2001	9	0
Total		15	0

== Honours ==
=== Club ===
Al-Zawraa

- Iraqi Premier League: 1993–94, 1994–95, 1995–96, 1999–2000, 2000–01
- Iraq FA Cup: 1992–93, 1993–94, 1994–95, 1995–96, 1999–2000
- Iraqi Super Cup: 2000

=== International ===
Iraq

- Nehru Cup: 1995
