= Pneu Flávio =

Angolan footballer

Pneu
Personal information
- Full name: Henrique Bernardo Jaulu
- Date of birth: 25 January 2003 (age 23)
- Place of birth: Huambo, Angola
- Height: 1.76 m (5 ft 9 in)
- Position: Winger

Team information
- Current team: Al-Minaa
- Number: 3

Youth career
- 2019–2021: Norberto de Castro

Senior career*
Years	Team	Apps	(Gls)
2021–2022	Baixa de Cassanje		
2022–2023	ASA		
2023–2026	Recreativo do Libolo	31	(7)
2025–2026	Zakho	0	(0)
2025–2026	→ Amanat Baghdad (loan)	33	(4)
2026–	Al-Minaa	2	(1)
- * Club domestic league appearances and goals as of 20 August 2026

Henrique Bernardo Jaulu (born 25 January 2003), known as Pneu Flávio, or simply Pneu, is an Angolan professional footballer who plays as a winger for Iraq Stars League club Al-Minaa.

== Club career ==
Pneu began his senior career with Angolan club Recreativo do Libolo, where he made 21 league appearances and scored three goals. At the end of the 2024–25 season, he was close to joining Petro de Luanda, but the proposed transfer was not completed after negotiations between the parties broke down.

On 13 August 2025, he signed a two-year contract with Iraqi club Zakho. One week later, on 20 August 2025, he joined fellow Iraq Stars League side Amanat Baghdad on loan for the 2025–26 season. He scored his first Iraq Stars League goal on 26 September 2025, netting the only goal in a 1–0 victory over Al-Qasim, which was Amanat Baghdad's first league win of the season. On 23 November 2025, he scored the winning goal in a 2–1 home victory against Al-Talaba. He scored again in a 1–1 draw against Al-Mosul on 17 April 2026, before opening the scoring in a 2–2 draw with Al-Qasim on 2 May 2026. Despite his contributions, Amanat Baghdad were relegated at the end of the season.

On 1 July 2026, Pneu joined Al-Minaa, remaining in the Iraq Stars League. On 20 August 2026, in the second round of the league, he came on as a substitute and managed to score the winning goal against Zakho, in a match that ended with a score of 2–1 for Al-Minaa.
