= Srđan Kljajević =

Montenegrin footballer and coach

Personal information
- Full name: Srđan Kljajević
- Date of birth: 23 November 1974 (age 51)
- Place of birth: Titograd, SFR Yugoslavia
- Height: 1.91 m (6 ft 3 in)
- Position: Goalkeeper

Youth career
- Bokelj

Senior career*
Years	Team	Apps	(Gls)
2001–2002	Zeta	34	(0)
2002–2003	Panachaiki	12	(0)
2003–2005	Egaleo	12	(0)
2005–2006	Rad	16	(0)
2006–2009	Grbalj	82	(0)
2009	Mornar	3	(0)
2010	Kom	10	(0)
Total		169	(0)

Managerial career
- 2015–2019: Lebanon (Goalkeeping Coach)
- 2019: Lebanon U23 (Goalkeeping Coach)
- * Club domestic league appearances and goals as of 1 July 2010

Srđan Kljajević (Cyrillic: Crђaн Kљajeвић; born 23 November 1974) is a Montenegrin goalkeeping coach and former player.

== Club career ==
Born in Titograd, Kljajević began playing football with the youth side of FK Bokelj. He played for FK Zeta, before joining Super League Greece side Panachaiki in July 2002. He would next play for fellow Superleague club Egaleo F.C., before moving to Serbian FK Rad Belgrade and already back in Montenegro, FK Grbalj. Since the winter-break of the 2009–10 season, he has been playing with FK Kom.
