= Ahmed Abdul-Hussein =

Iraqi footballer (born 1997)

Personal information
- Full name: Ahmed Abdul-Hussein Hamid Al-Kaabi
- Date of birth: 22 October 1997 (age 29)
- Place of birth: Iraq
- Height: 1.87 m (6 ft 2 in)
- Positions: Right-back; right midfielder

Team information
- Current team: Al-Minaa
- Number: 28

Senior career*
Years	Team	Apps	(Gls)
2017–2022	Al-Najaf		(1)
2017	→ Al-Nasiriya (loan)		
2022–2024	Al-Zawraa		(1)
2024	Naft Al-Wasat		(1)
2024–2025	Al-Najaf	6	(0)
2025	Al-Karma	11	(0)
2025–2026	Amanat Baghdad	24	(0)
2026–	Al-Minaa	3	(1)

International career^{‡}
2021–	Iraq	2	(0)
- * Club domestic league appearances and goals as of 26 August 2026 ‡ National team caps and goals as of 29 May 2021

Ahmed Abdul-Hussein (Arabic: أَحْمَد عَبْد الْحُسَيْن; born 22 October 1997) is an Iraqi footballer who plays as a right-back or right-midfielder for Iraq Stars League club Al-Minaa.

== International career ==
On 29 March 2021, Ahmed Abdul-Hussein made his first international cap with Iraq against Uzbekistan in a friendly match in Tashkent that ended with an Iraqi victory 1–0 over the host team.
