= Malek Miladi =

Tunisian footballer

Personal information
- Full name: Malek Habib Miladi
- Date of birth: 24 December 1996 (age 29)
- Place of birth: Tunis, Tunisia
- Height: 1.88 m (6 ft 2 in)
- Position: Defender

Team information
- Current team: Al-Minaa
- Number: 5

Youth career
- Espérance

Senior career*
Years	Team	Apps	(Gls)
2015–2018	Espérance	0	(0)
2015–2016	→ EO Sidi Bouzid (loan)	24	(1)
2017	→ US Ben Guerdane (loan)		
2018	→ CO Médenine (loan)	11	(0)
2018–2020	US Tataouine	30	(1)
2020–2021	Arar		
2021–2022	Al-Nasr		
2022–2023	Al-Safa		
2023–2024	Al-Entesar		
2024–2026	US Monastir	0	(0)
2026–	Al-Minaa		
- * Club domestic league appearances and goals

Malek Miladi (born 24 December 1996) is a Tunisian footballer who plays for Al-Minaa as a defender.

== Career ==
On 17 July 2024, Miladi joined US Monastir. On 18 June 2026, he moved to Iraq to sign a contract with Al-Minaa.
