= Houssem Habbassi =

Tunisian footballer

Personal information
- Full name: Houssem Habbassi
- Date of birth: 1 January 1996 (age 30)
- Place of birth: Tunisia
- Height: 1.75 m (5 ft 9 in)
- Position: Winger

Team information
- Current team: Al-Minaa
- Number: 20

Youth career
- –2015: Club Africain
- 2015–2016: CS Sfaxien

Senior career*
Years	Team	Apps	(Gls)
2016–2017	CS Sfaxien	7	(1)
2017–2020	CA Bizertin	44	(6)
2020	Club Africain	0	(0)
2020–2022	Stade Tunisien	17	(0)
2023	Al-Wahda		
2023	Al-Ahli	3	(0)
2023–2025	US Ben Guerdane	38	(8)
2025–2026	Al Nasr		
2026–	Al-Minaa		
- * Club domestic league appearances and goals as of 14 September 2025

Houssem Habbassi (born 1 January 1996) is a Tunisian professional footballer who plays as a winger for Iraq Stars League club Al-Minaa.

== Career ==
Habbassi began playing football at a young age in the youth academy of Club Africain, progressing through the club's youth ranks before joining the youth academy of CS Sfaxien. He was promoted to the first team ahead of the 2016 season. On 9 April 2017, He scored the winning goal in a 2–1 away victory over Burkina Faso's RC Kadiogo in Ouagadougou in the second leg of the 2017 CAF Confederation Cup round of 16. On 5 July 2017, He failed to report for the team's training sessions and was unreachable by club officials, who were attempting to negotiate a contract renewal. He subsequently terminated his contract with CS Sfaxien in order to join Espérance de Tunis. CS Sfaxien subsequently dismissed Habbassi and filed a complaint against him. The competent football authorities later suspended him for six months and ordered him to pay CS Sfaxien 62,000 Tunisian dinars in compensation after ruling that he had unilaterally terminated his contract.

On 8 September 2017, He signed a three-year contract with CA Bizertin. However, due to his six-month suspension, he was not eligible to make his official debut for the club until January 2018. On 20 February 2020, He joined Club Africain, signing a two-year contract with the club. However, he did not make any official appearances for Club Africain, as sporting activities were suspended due to the COVID-19 pandemic. Seven months later, his contract with the club was terminated by mutual consent, after which he joined Stade Tunisien on a two-year deal.

On 16 May 2023, He moved to the Libyan Premier League, signing with Al-Wahda on a contract until the end of the season. On 19 July 2023, He signed with Libyan Premier League champions Al-Ahli. On 23 August 2023, He returned to Tunisia and signed a two-year contract with US Ben Guerdane. On 14 January 2025, after spending one and a half seasons with the club, Habbassi's contract with US Ben Guerdane was terminated by mutual consent.

On 20 January 2025, Habbassi joined Kuwaiti Premier League club Al Nasr. On 20 July 2026, he joined Iraq Stars League club Al-Minaa.
