= Yassin Samia =

Syrian footballer (born 1998)

Personal information
- Date of birth: 22 February 1998 (age 28)
- Place of birth: Syria
- Height: 1.85 m (6 ft 1 in)
- Position: Forward

Team information
- Current team: Al-Minaa
- Number: 9

Senior career*
Years	Team	Apps	(Gls)
2019–2021	Al-Horgelah		
2021–2022	Erbil		(6)
2022–2023	Naft Maysan		(9)
2023–2024	Erbil		
2024–2025	Al-Wahda		
2025	Safa SC	5	(1)
2025–2026	Al-Karamah		
2026–	Al-Minaa	18	(9)

International career^{‡}
2022–	Syria	12	(3)
- * Club domestic league appearances and goals as of 20 August 2026 ‡ National team caps and goals as of 11 December 2025

Yassin Samia (Arabic: ياسين سامية; born 22 February 1998) is a Syrian professional footballer who plays as a forward for Al-Minaa and the Syria national team.

== International career ==
On 24 March 2022, Samia was called up for the Syria national team and made his first international games against Lebanon in FIFA World Cup qualification. He also participated in the next match against Iraq on March 29 in the same tournament.

=== International goals ===
No.	Date	Venue	Opponent	Score	Result	Competition
1.	6 September 2023	Chengdu University Football Stadium, Chengdu, China	Malaysia	2–0	2–2	Friendly
2.	18 November 2025	Jinnah Sports Stadium, Islamabad, Pakistan	Pakistan	3–0	5–0	2027 AFC Asian Cup qualification
3.	18 November 2025	Jinnah Sports Stadium, Islamabad, Pakistan	Pakistan	5–0	5–0	2027 AFC Asian Cup qualification
