= Ridha Abdulaziz =

Iraqi footballer (born 2003)

Personal information
- Full name: Ridha Abdulaziz Mohammed Al Shami
- Date of birth: 24 February 2003 (age 23)
- Place of birth: Iraq
- Height: 1.90 m (6 ft 3 in)
- Position: Goalkeeper

Team information
- Current team: Al-Minaa
- Number: 12

Senior career*
Years	Team	Apps	(Gls)
2020–2023	Al-Diwaniya		
2023–2025	Al-Najaf		
2025	Newroz		
2026–	Al-Minaa		

International career^{‡}
2023	Iraq U20	3	(0)
2023–	Iraq U23	10	(0)
- * Club domestic league appearances and goals as of 20 September 2025 ‡ National team caps and goals as of 14 January 2026

Ridha Abdulaziz (born 24 February 2003) is an Iraqi professional footballer who plays as a goalkeeper for Iraq Stars League side Al-Minaa.

== Club career ==
In September 2020, Abdulaziz officially signed with Al-Diwaniya. After three seasons and the club's relegation, he moved to Al-Najaf, officially signing with them in September 2023. In April 2025, during the Middle Euphrates derby match against Karbala, he suffered a nose injury and was sidelined after undergoing surgery. In July 2025, he officially transferred to Newroz, but in December of the same year, he mutually terminated his contract with the club's management.

On 18 June 2026, he moved to Al-Minaa and the club officially announced his signing.

== International career ==
Abdulaziz was first picked to represent Iraq in 2023, when the under-20 coach Emad Mohammed selected him to be a part of his 23-man squad to play in 2023 AFC U-20 Asian Cup, which the team was able to reached the final and finished as runners-up in the tournament. In 2023, he was called up to the under-23 by coach Radhi Shenaishil to participate in the 2023 WAFF U-23 Championship, and helped the team win the championship title. He was also named to the 26-man squad for the 2026 AFC U-23 Asian Cup qualification. and 2026 AFC U-23 Asian Cup.

== Honours ==
Iraq U20

- AFC U-20 Asian Cup runners-up: 2023

Iraq U23

- WAFF U-23 Championship: 2023
