= Pogba =

Pogba is a Guinean surname. Notable people with the surname include the Pogba brothers, all professional footballers:

- Florentin Pogba (born 1990)
- Mathias Pogba (born 1990)
- Paul Pogba (born 1993)
