= Mahmoud Khalil (footballer) =

Iraqi footballer (born 1995)

Personal information
- Date of birth: 12 January 1995 (age 31)
- Place of birth: Iraq
- Position: Forward

Team information
- Current team: Al-Minaa
- Number: 8

Senior career*
Years	Team	Apps	(Gls)
2014–2016	Al-Sinaa		
2016–2017	Zakho		
2017–2021	Al-Karkh		
2020	→ Al-Zawraa (loan)		
2021–2022	Naft Al-Wasat		
2022–2023	Al-Naft		
2023	Erbil		
2023–2024	Al-Kahrabaa		
2024–2025	Al-Karma		
2025–2026	Al-Minaa	1	(0)

International career^{‡}
2021–	Iraq	1	(0)
- * Club domestic league appearances and goals as of 14 September 205 ‡ National team caps and goals as of 19 January 2021

Mahmoud Khalil (born 12 January 1995) is an Iraqi footballer who plays as a forward for Iraq Stars League club Al-Minaa.

== International career ==
On 12 January 2021, Mahmoud Khalil made his first international cap with Iraq against the UAE in a friendly.
