= Reda Majji =

Moroccan footballer (born 2001)

Personal information
- Full name: Reda Majji
- Date of birth: 12 June 2001 (age 25)
- Place of birth: Casablanca, Morocco
- Height: 1.73 m (5 ft 8 in)
- Position: Right winger

Team information
- Current team: Duhok
- Number: 7

Youth career
- 2019–2021: Chabab Mohammédia
- 2021–2022: Raja CA

Senior career*
Years	Team	Apps	(Gls)
2022–2023	Racing		
2023–2025	DHJ		(6)
2025–2026	Al-Minaa		
2026–	Duhok		
- * Club domestic league appearances and goals as of 3 July 2026

Reda Majji (born 12 June 2001) is a Moroccan professional footballer who plays as a right winger for Iraq Stars League club Duhok.

== Career ==
Majji started playing at the SCC Mohammédia Academy and then moved to Raja CA, and on 13 September 2022, he moved to Racing de Casablanca. After one season, he moved to Difaâ Hassani El Jadidi, and on 29 September 2023, he scored two goals against COD Meknès in a match that his team won 4–2. On 6 November 2023, he scored the winning goal for his team against Jeunesse Ben Guerir after an individual effort in a match that ended with a score of 2–1. On 30 March 2024, he scored his team's only goal in a 2–1 defeat against Olympique Club de Khouribga. On 22 October 2024, he scored the only winning goal for his team against MA Tétouan. On 9 May 2025, he scored a goal for his team against Raja CA in a match that his team lost 3–2.

On 31 July 2025, he moved to Iraq and signed a contract with Al-Minaa, which plays in the Iraq Stars League. On 14 September, he made his debut for the team in a league match against Naft Maysan, which won 3–1, and in which he scored his first goal. At the end of the season, Al-Minaa terminated his contract. In July 2026, he moved to Duhok.
