= Ali Ibadi =

Iraqi footballer (born 2000)

Personal information
- Full name: Ali Ibadi Jabbar Ghuraibawi
- Date of birth: 16 February 2000 (age 26)
- Place of birth: Baghdad, Iraq
- Height: 1.91 m (6 ft 3 in)
- Position: Goalkeeper

Team information
- Current team: Karbala
- Number: 22

Youth career
- 2016–2018: Al-Quwa Al-Jawiya

Senior career*
Years	Team	Apps	(Gls)
2018–2019	Al-Quwa Al-Jawiya		
2019–2021	Al-Naft		
2021–2024	Al-Kahrabaa		
2024–2025	Al-Quwa Al-Jawiya		
2025–2026	Al-Minaa		
2026–	Karbala		

International career^{‡}
2015–2016	Iraq U16	3	(0)
2016–2017	Iraq U17	4	(0)
2023–	Iraq	0	(0)
- * Club domestic league appearances and goals as of 20 September 2025 ‡ National team caps and goals as of 24 January 2024

Ali Ibadi Jabbar Ghuraibawi (born 16 February 2000) is an Iraqi professional footballer who plays as a goalkeeper for Iraqi Stars League side Karbala.

== Club career ==
Ibadi started playing football at the Al-Quwa Al-Jawiya, At the end of 2017, the player rebelled against the technical staff and did not attend the team's daily training sessions. He was subsequently excluded, and then moved to Al-Naft and then to Al-Kahrabaa. On 20 April 2023, the player fainted during his team's match against Naft Al-Basra, due to him being fasting and the match being played under the scorching sun, which affected the player's physical and health condition.

On 14 August 2024, he moved to Al-Quwa Al-Jawiya and signed a contract with the club. After one season, on 9 August 2025, he moved to Al-Minaa and the club officially announced his signing.

== International career ==
Ibadi was first picked to represent Iraq in 2015, when the under-16 coach Qahtan Chathir selected him to be a part of his 23-man squad to play in 2015 WAFF U-16 Championship, which the team was able to win. He was also part of the team in the 2016 AFC U-16 Championship, which the team also won. He was also part of the team in the 2017 FIFA U-17 World Cup and performed well and was one of the most prominent players of the team in the tournament. In 2023, he was called up to the Iraq by coach Jesús Casas to participate in the 25th Arabian Gulf Cup, but he did not participate in the tournament.

== Honours ==
Iraq U16

- WAFF U-16 Championship: 2015
- AFC U-16 Championship: 2016

Al-Kahrabaa

- Iraq FA Cup runners-up: 2021–22
