= Dhiaeddine Jouini =

Tunisian footballer

Personal information
- Full name: Dhiaeddine Jouini
- Date of birth: 1 March 1996 (age 30)
- Place of birth: Tunisia
- Height: 1.87 m (6 ft 2 in)
- Position: Centre-back

Team information
- Current team: Al-Minaa
- Number: 14

Youth career
- –2017: ES Sahel

Senior career*
Years	Team	Apps	(Gls)
2017–2021	ES Hammam-Sousse		
2021–2022	Olympique Béja	18	(0)
2022–2023	AS FAR	1	(0)
2023–2025	US Monastir	11	(2)
2025–	Al-Minaa	1	(0)
- * Club domestic league appearances and goals as of 14 September 2025

Dhiaeddine Jouini (born 1 March 1996) is a Tunisian professional footballer who plays as a centre-back for Iraq Stars League club Al-Minaa.

== Career ==
Jouini is a central defender, born on 1 March 1996. He began his career at the Etoile Sportive du Sahel academy, then moved to ES Hammam-Sousse, where he played for several seasons.

On 5 July 2021, he moved to Olympique Béja for one season. He then moved to Morocco on 9 August 2022, to sign a three-year contract with the AS FAR. After one season, the club's management attempted to get rid of him and terminated his contract.

On 7 August 2023, he moved to US Monastir on a two-year contract, and on 13 March 2025, he scored two goals against ES Zarzis, leading his team to a 2–1 victory.

On 31 July 2025, he moved to Iraq to sign a contract with Al-Minaa.

== Honours ==
AS FAR

- Botola Pro: 2022–23

US Monastir

- Tunisian Ligue Professionnelle 1 runner-up: 2023–24, 2024–25
