= Ahamad Azzawi =

Japanese footballer (born 1994)

Personal information
- Date of birth: November 1, 1994 (age 31)
- Place of birth: Japan
- Position: Midfielder

Team information
- Current team: Al-Minaa
- Number: 20

Youth career
- 2007–2009: FC Tama
- 2010–2012: Kanto Daiichi High School

College career
Years	Team	Apps	(Gls)
2013–2015	Toin University of Yokohama		

Senior career*
Years	Team	Apps	(Gls)
2016	Capalaba FC		
2017	Global FC		
2018–2022	Al-Kahrabaa SC		
2022–2023	Al-Zawraa SC		
2023–2025	Newroz SC		
2025–2026	Al-Minaa	7	(3)
- * Club domestic league appearances and goals as of 22 November 2025

Ahamad Azzawi (Japanese: 宇羽井アハマド; Arabic: احمد العزاوي; born 1 November 1994) is a Japanese footballer who plays as a midfielder for Al-Minaa in Iraq Stars League.

== Early life ==
Azzawi grew up in Tokyo, Japan. He attended Kanto Daiichi High School in Japan. After that, he attended Toin University of Yokohama in Japan. He is a native of Tama, Japan.

== Career ==
In 2016, Azzawi signed for Australian side Capalaba FC. He was the top scorer of the 2016 Brisbane Premier League with twenty-two goals. In 2017, he signed for Filipino side Global FC. In 2018, he signed for Iraqi side Al-Kahrabaa SC. He became the first Japanese player to play for an Iraqi side. He was described as "one of the distinguished talents in the Kahraba team, due to his great skill". In 2022, he signed for Iraqi side Al-Zawraa SC. In 2023, he signed for Iraqi side Newroz SC.

On 9 August 2025, he moved to Al-Minaa, where the club announced his contract with him officially.

== Style of play ==
Azzawi mainly operates as a midfielder. He has also operated as a full-back.

== Personal life ==
He has been nicknamed "Ahamad Japanese". He is fluent in English and Japanese. He is of Iraqi descent. He obtained an Iraqi passport.
