= Najm Shwan =

Iraqi footballer (born 1997)

Personal information
- Full name: Najm Shwan Ali Al Quraishi
- Date of birth: 9 July 1997 (age 29)
- Place of birth: Iraq
- Position: Defender

Team information
- Current team: Al-Minaa

Senior career*
Years	Team	Apps	(Gls)
2015–2017	Al-Zawraa	26	(1)
2017–2018	Al-Dhafra	6	(0)
2017–2018	→ Rudar Velenje (loan)	2	(0)
2018–2023	Al-Zawraa		
2023–2024	Al-Kahrabaa	4	(2)
2024–2025	Duhok		
2025–2026	Al-Minaa	1	(0)

International career^{‡}
2019–2020	Iraq U23	3	(0)
2019–	Iraq	2	(0)
- * Club domestic league appearances and goals as of 14 September 2025 ‡ National team caps and goals as of 19 March 2018

Najm Shwan (born 9 July 1997) is an Iraqi footballer who plays as a defender for Al-Minaa in Iraq Stars League and the Iraq national team.

== International career ==
On 11 August 2019, Shwan made his first international cap with Iraq against Yemen in the 2019 WAFF Championship.

== Honours ==
Al-Zawraa

- Iraqi Premier League: 2015–16
- Iraq FA Cup: 2016–17, 2018–19

Duhok

- Iraq FA Cup: 2024–25
- AGCFF Gulf Club Champions League: 2024–25
