= Ahmad ibn Muhammad al-Ta'i =

Ahmad ibn Muhammad al-Ta'i (Arabic: أحمد بن محمد الطائي; died August 31, 894) was an administrative official in the service of the Abbasid Caliphate. He held various military and financial posts in Iraq and Arabia in the late ninth century, during the caliphates of al-Mu'tamid (r. 870–892) and al-Mu'tadid (r. 892–902).

== Career ==
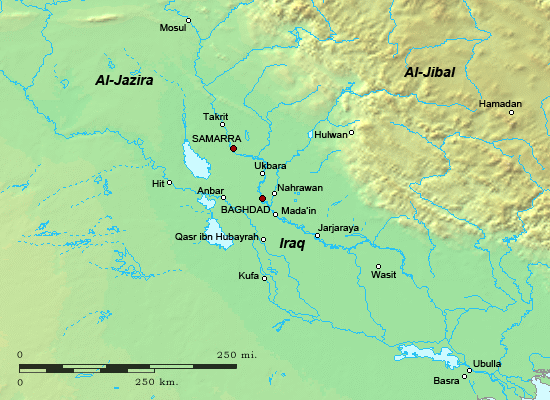
Map of Iraq in the 9th century

Ahmad first appears in al-Tabari's history near the beginning of 883, when he was appointed governor of al-Kufah and its Sawad. During his tenure over al-Kufah, he routed al-Haysam al-'Ijli and confiscated his wealth and assets. He was also accused of accepting payments from Qarmatians operating in the area in exchange for leaving them alone, by which he was able to collect an immense fortune.

In March 885 Ahmad received the governorships of Medina and the Mecca Road, and he appointed a ghulam named Badr to oversee the pilgrims in Mecca. After arriving in the city, however, Badr was seized by Yusuf ibn Abi al-Saj, the governor of Mecca, and put into chains. The pilgrims and a detachment of the local garrison responded by rescuing Badr and attacking Yusuf, who was bound and taken to Baghdad.

During a dispute between Baghdad and Samarra in early 886, in which the two cities implemented economic blockades against each other, Ahmad was blamed by the residents of Baghdad for a rise in food prices after he prohibited estate owners from threshing and distributing their crops. In late March a mob assembled outside of his residence, but they were attacked by Ahmad's troops and several of them were killed. Further violence was prevented only by the intervention of Muhammad ibn Tahir, who rode to the area the next day and convinced the people to disperse.

In early 888 Ahmad dispatched an army against the brigand Siddiq al-Farghani, who had attacked and plundered Dur Samarra. Ahmad then went to Samarra himself and lured Siddiq with a guarantee of safe conduct, only to seize him, cut off one of his hands and feet, and imprison him and his followers in Baghdad. Shortly after this, he again set out against another vagabond named al-'Abdi, who had looted the area of Karkh Samarra. Ahmad was able to rout al-'Abdi and seize most of his men, but when he attempted to cross the Tigris the anchor of his vessel was seized by al-'Abdi's men, forcing him to jump into the river and swim to safety.

In January 889 Ahmad was suddenly arrested and thrown into prison on the orders of the caliphal regent al-Muwaffaq, and according to al-Tabari this event marked the end of his career. By the time of his arrest, he had been appointed to the governorships of al-Kufah and its Sawad, the Khurasan Road and Samarra, the shurtah of Baghdad, and as revenue official of Baduraya, Qatrabbul, Maskin and some of the private domains of the caliph (diya' al-khassah).

Despite Ahmad's arrest he was apparently soon restored to favor, for in the beginning of the reign of al-Mu'tadid he agreed to a tax farming contract with the central government. In exchange for an annual obligation of 2,520,000 gold dinars, or 7,000 dinars daily, he was appointed as revenue official over several districts in central Iraq. The caliphal government also formed an operating budget based on the contract, listing in detail the expenses that Ahmad's payments would be used on.

Ahmad died in al-Kufah in 894 and was buried in Masjid al-Sahlah. Following his death, his ghilman Badr and Shibl remained in caliphal service and were appointed to various posts in Iraq.
