= Zurbatiyah =

- Location within Iraq
- Coordinates: 33°09′0″N 46°03′0″E
- Country: Iraq
- Governorate: Wasit
- Municipality: Badra District
- Elevation: 120 m (390 ft)

Population (2011)
  - Total: 22,400

Zurbatiyah (Arabic: زرباطية) is a city located in Wasit Governorate, Iraq and is a busy port of entry from Iran. It was previously inhabited by majority Arabs and minority Turkoman up until the late 20th century where Kurds now are a majority. The Ottoman treaty of 1639 identifies three settlements as part of the Ottoman empire, being Jassan, Badra and Zurbatiyah. This arrangement left Zurbatiyah on the Ottoman side and rejected the Banu Lam's tenuous assertions to Bayat and Dehloran which split the Arab tribes living there. Feyli Kurds migrated during the 19th century under Safavid Iran.

Most of Zurbatiya and Badra were Sunni Shafi'i, with minority Shia Muslims. Their language is described as Turkish mixed with Arabic, Kurdish and Persian. It is just across the border from Mehran, Ilam, in Iran. In 1982, there were approximately 6000 inhabitants. Of the settlements referred to in the 1639 Treaty, only Mendeli was a fairly important town, whereas Zurbatiya, Badrai (Badra), and Jassan were villages. Between these places and Muhammarah, was desert dotted lands.

In the Badra - Zurbatiya area the salinity is generally higher than in the Mandali alluvial fan, usually up to 2-3 or even 4 g / L . This may be due to higher annual precipitation in the Mandali area ( almost 300 mm ) than in the Badra area. The Zurbatiyah port of entry, east of Baghdad, is one of Iraq's busiest crossing points. Hundreds of Iranians, mainly pilgrims heading for the Shiite holy cities of Najaf and Karbala, cross the border on foot each day. UAE, China awarded rights to develop oil in Iraq's northeast in 2018.

== History ==
During the 1980s, Iranian forces bombarded the two Iraqi townships of Khanagin and Zurbatiya with heavy artillery, forcing many of the Arab population to leave alongside Iraqi troops, advancing towards the borders instead. Most of the small houses and buildings were destroyed as a result, leaving the town in ruins with only few Iranian Kurds living in these after migration from west Iran. Following 2003 fall of iraq saw the largest influx of Feyli Kurds from Iran into the town as well as the Arab, Turkoman and minority Chechen population to migrate from Zurbatiyah.

== Climate ==
Baghdad is 169 kilometers from Zurbāţīyah, so the actual climate in Zurbāţīyah can vary a bit.

Based on weather reports collected during 2005–2015.

=== All Year Climate & Weather Averages in Zurbāţīyah ===
High Temp: 37 °C

Low Temp: -1 °C

Mean Temp: 17 °C

Precipitation: 39.2 mm

Humidity: 40%

Dew Point: 1 °C

Wind: 5 mph

Pressure: 1011 mbar

Visibility: 9 km

== Geography ==
Gypsum rocks of Fatha Formation in Zurbatiyah area, eastern Iraq were studied in terms of mineralogy and petrography. Mineralogically, X-ray diffractometry results reveal that gypsum rocks are predominantly composed of gypsum minerals with minor amounts of calcite, anhydrite, basanite and dolomite minerals. Scanning electron microscopy has shown that gypsum rocks rich inclusion with (Mg) in some samples. Fatha gypsum rocks have higher thickness in the succession of formation with marl, clay and limestone forming multi cyclic deposition. The thickness of Fatha formation in the studied area reach to 525 m. Petrographically and textural analyses reveal the common petrographically texture types of gypsum, alabastrine, satin spar, selenite, porphyroblastic, blocky, and columnar gypsum texture reflect evolutionary alterations relationships such as crystallization and recrystallization of gypsum rocks. The secondary hydration of anhydrite to gypsum and other alteration changes refer to shallow marine, supra-tidal and continental environments to the Fatha Formation.

== See also ==
- Combat Outpost Shocker- U.S. Coalition base located in Zurbatiyah, Iraq.
