= Sawad =

Historical region in Southern Iraq

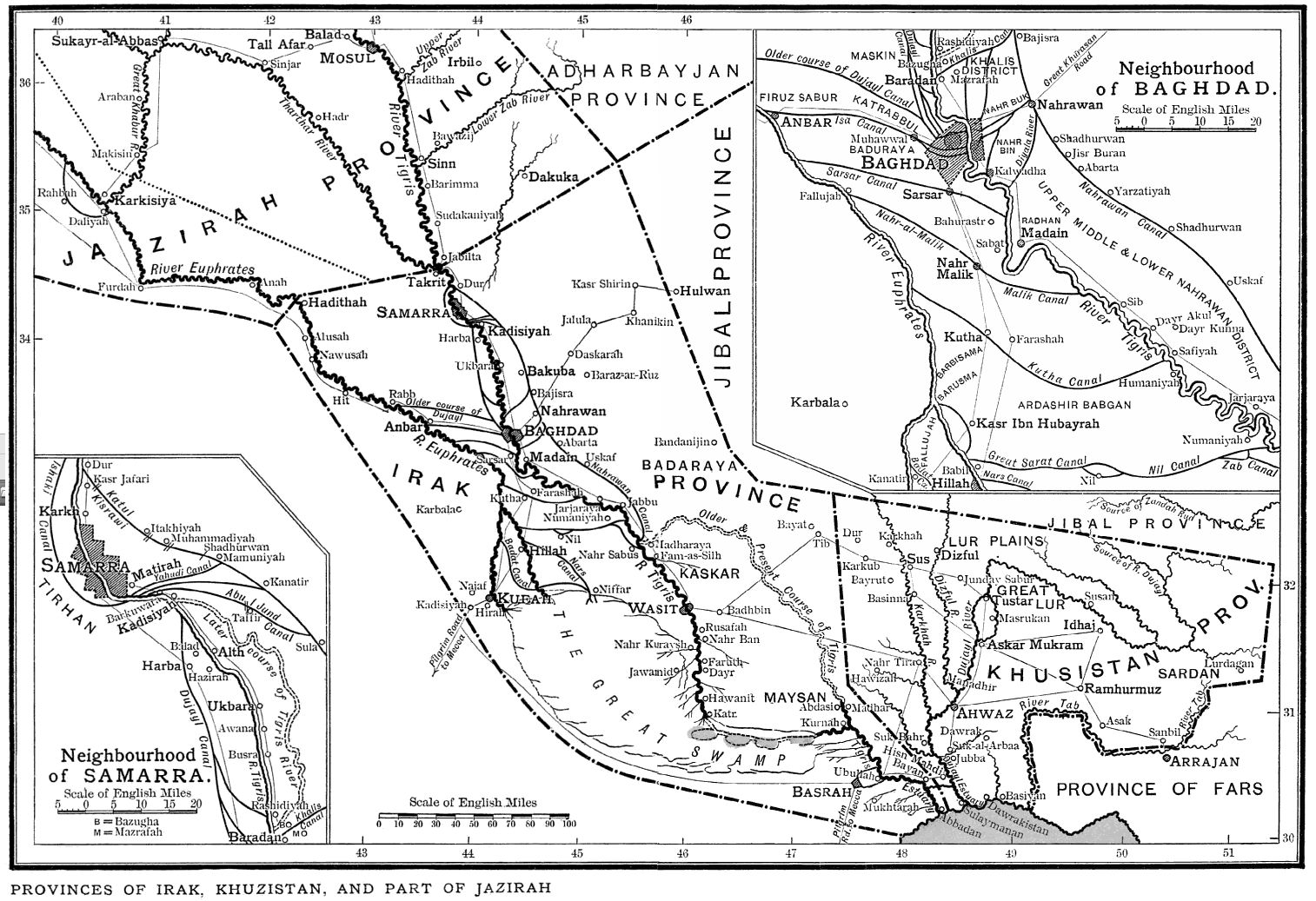
Map of the Sawad ("Irak") under the Abbasid Caliphate

Sawad was the name used in early Islamic times (7th–12th centuries) for southern Iraq. It means "black land" or "arable land" and refers to the stark contrast between the alluvial plain of Mesopotamia and the Arabian Desert. Under the Umayyad and Abbasid Caliphates, it was an official political term for a province encompassing most of modern Iraq except for the Syrian Desert and Upper Mesopotamia in the north.

As a generic term in Arabic, sawād (سواد) was used to denote the irrigated and cultivated areas in any district. Unmodified, it always referred to southern Iraq, the sawād of Baghdad. It replaced the earlier and more narrow term Rādhān.

The term sawad eventually came to refer to the rural district around a particular city; thus, contemporary geographers made references to the Sawad of Baghdad, of Basra, of Kufa, of Wasit, of Samarra, or of Anbar. This usage was exclusive to Iraq.

== Geography ==
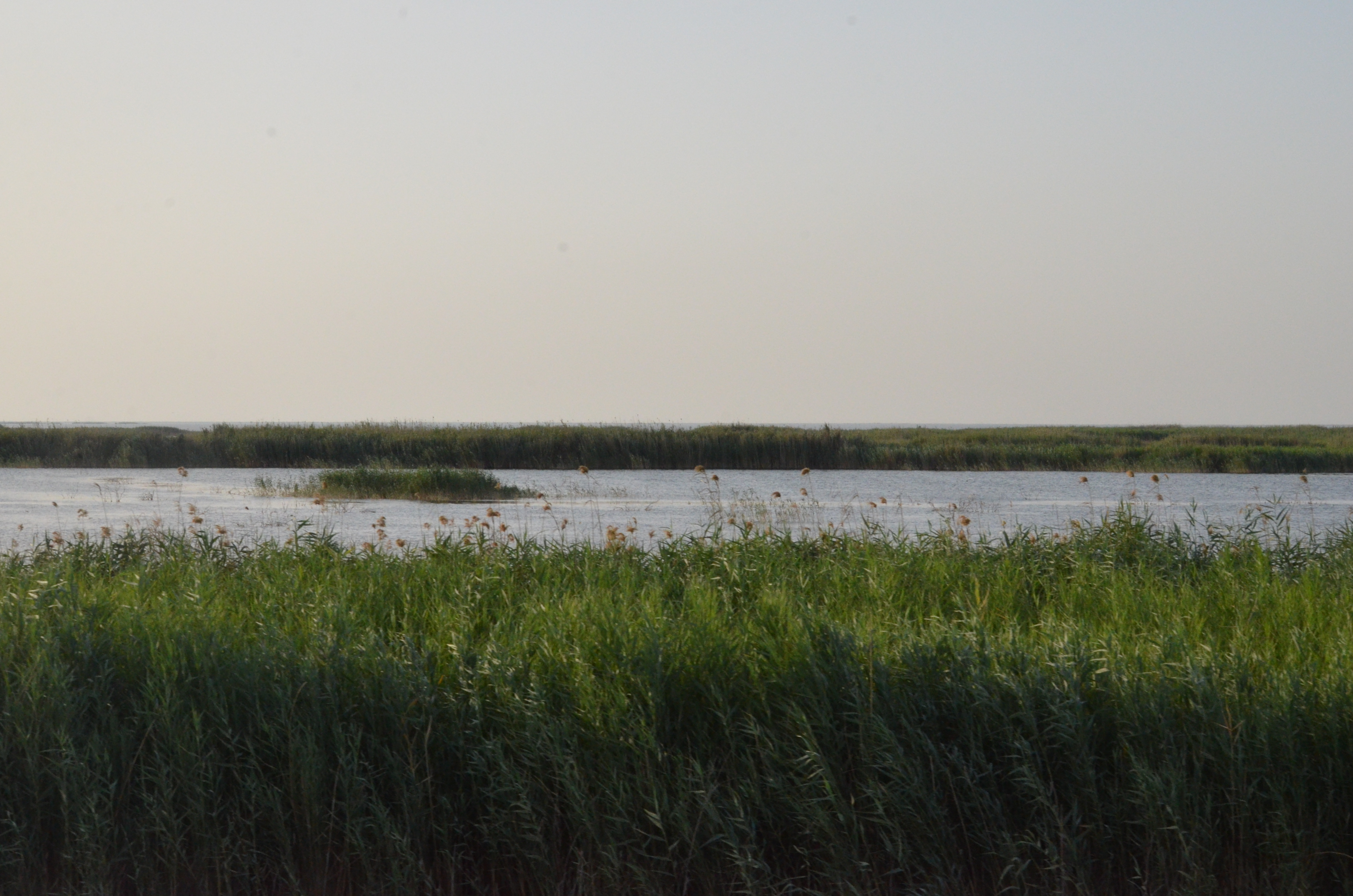
Marshes of southern Iraq

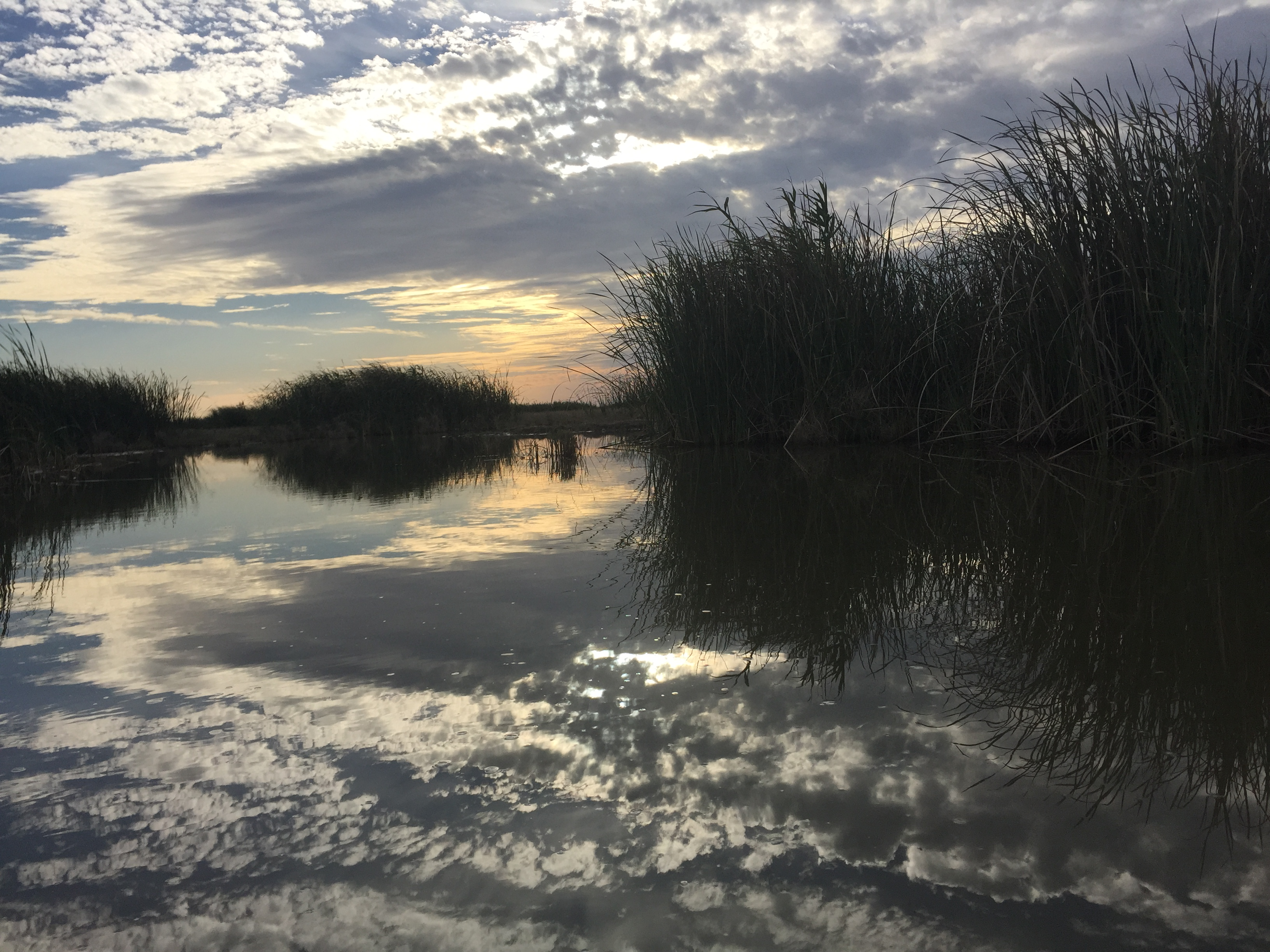
Marshes of southern Iraq

The enormous economic potential of the Sawad is reflected in early Abbasid revenue lists: the Sawad produced four times as much tax revenue as the second-highest-producing province, Egypt, and five times as much as Syria and Palestine combined.

During the medieval period, the lower Tigris followed a different course than it does today. It had shifted further west due to the floods of the early 7th century (before this, its course was the same as it is today). It passed the city of Wasit and entered the Batihah at the town of Qatr. According to Donald Hill, after about 1200, the Tigris and Euphrates started to gradually shift toward their present courses, which they finally reached during the 1500s. On the other hand, Stephen Hemsley Longrigg described the shift as taking place in the period between 1500 and 1650. (Note: Quoted in Adams, The Uruk Countryside, p. 67)

In Sasanian times, the Euphrates likely entered the swamps close to the site of the modern town of Shinafiya.

The Batihah (plural: Bata'ih) or great swamp was the medieval name for the vast marshlands of southern Iraq, along the lower courses of the Tigris and Euphrates. In the northwest, it stretched almost up to Kufa and Nippur, while in the northeast it began at al-Qatr, downstream from Wasit on the Tigris. Suhrab lists four great lagoons (Ḥawr) in the Batihah: Bahassa, Bakhmasa, Basriyatha, and finally al-Muhammadiyah, which was the largest. Below the Hawr al-Muhammadiyah, the channel called the Nahr Abi'l-As'ad finally carried the waters of the Batihah to the head of the Dijlah al-`Awra', or "one-eyed Tigris". The hydrography of the Bata'ih was not static.

Ibn Rustah described the Bata'ih as covered by reed beds crossed by water channels, where enormous amounts of fish where caught, then salted and exported to neighboring provinces. The water level was too shallow for most river boats to pass through, and only special pole-propelled vessels called mashhuf could be used for transport. Most of the marshes were covered by water, but there were some areas with good soil, where people formed settlements, grew crops, and dug canals for irrigation.

=== Climate ===
In Iraq, there are two very distinct seasons: summer and winter. Spring and autumn are very short. Summer, which lasts from May through October, is intensely hot and dry, with the sky mostly cloudless and rain extremely rare. The prevailing northwest wind (the Shamal) is a hot wind and is strong during the day but dissipates at night. Winter lasts from November until April, and the northwest winds are weaker and often interrupted by depressions coming from the Mediterranean. The southeast winds (called Sharqi) are accompanied by cold temperatures, cloudy skies, and rain. Average winter rainfall is about 5 inches. Frost may occur anywhere in Iraq during the winter, except for the southernmost parts, and they come in the wake of the depressions, after the rain. Snow sometimes lays on the ground for several days.

According to Husam Qawam El-Samarraie, the climate of Iraq during the Abbasid era was probably similar to today, although the greater abundance of date palm orchards then "may have mitigated the violence of the winter winds and prevented the occurrence of the sandstorms that now sweep all over the country."

=== Challenges to agriculture ===
The main crop-growing season in this region comes during the winter, and irrigation is needed at least monthly. However, neither the Tigris nor the Euphrates reaches its high water mark during the winter when farmers need water the most: the Tigris is fed by several tributaries in the Zagros mountains, and melting snows in the mountains lead to high water in April. The Euphrates, on the other hand, mostly consists of water from the Anatolian highlands, and melting snow reaches lower Mesopotamia later, in early May. This is too late to help with growing crops for the May and June harvest season.

The timing of the flooding in the Euphrates was less helpful than the Tigris. The Tigris, however, is prone to flooding, since winter and spring storms in the Zagros mountains lead to highly destructive floods. The most destructive flood on the Tigris in modern times was in 1954, when there was a flow of 16,000 cumecs, whereas the worst flood on the Euphrates was in 1929 with only 5,200 cumecs. The Euphrates was therefore more manageable, while settlements along the Tigris had to be built away from the river to avoid being destroyed by flooding. Additionally, the Tigris's banks were so deep that canals had to be extended far down the backslope of the protective levees built along the river in order to keep a high enough water level. Yet these labor-intensive canal offtakes were directly exposed to the floods and could be suddenly buried under a deep layer of silt.

Later on, however, a vast canal system came to use the flow of the Tigris to supplement the Euphrates: during the winter growing season, when the Tigris was less prone to intense flooding, Tigris water was brought in, and then its headworks closed off and protected as much as possible, while now the greatly enlarged Euphrates was used to support irrigation efforts. This massive reshaping of the natural relationship between these rivers, which reached its peak during the Sasanian period, led to a mushrooming population and the rise of many new cities.

== History ==
The vast, complex systems that emerged during the Sassanid period ultimately made local self-sufficiency impossible. Lack of maintenance on canals could have a strong adverse effect on faraway regions. This made state supervision of the infrastructure absolutely necessary to maintain this degree of settlement and cultivation.

Settlement in Iraq reached its apex during the late Sassanid period. The tumult surrounding the Islamic conquest led to a sudden, steep decline. Fairly quickly, however, the Muslims were able to restore much of the Sassanid establishment. However, from the mid-800s onward, political instability in the Abbasid Caliphate led to a neglect of the rural economy and more corrupt exploitation of the peasantry in search of short-term profits. This led to a long period of decline in population and in cultivated area over the centuries until the Mongol conquest. The destruction accompanying the Mongol conquest was the dramatic final blow to the patterns of settlements in Iraq.

=== Background ===
From as early as the late fourth millennium BCE, southern Mesopotamia was home to an urban civilization built upon irrigation agriculture. This enabled the security, stability, population density, and complex social organization that characterized this urban setting.

=== Sasanian ===
Warfare with the Roman Empire sometimes threatened the security of the region, particularly the areas to the west of the Tigris. There was widespread destruction of major urban centers as well as rural agricultural infrastructure that was necessary for recovery. For example, even the area of the Nahr al-Malik, deep within Sassanid territory, was devastated by the Roman emperor Julian's invasion of Mesopotamia. The Persians destroyed dikes, which caused extensive flooding, while simultaneously damming up major waterways to prevent the Romans from being able to use them for transport. The Romans, meanwhile, burned small towns and villages in the countryside while also destroying farms and killing livestock.

Since the destruction largely occurred west of the Tigris, the Sassanid emperors focused on developing the region of Ctesiphon and its hinterlands east of the Tigris, while investing less in the regions on the west bank. Thus, settlement retracted west of the Tigris from its peak during Parthian rule. In the Diyala valley east of the Tigris, however, settlement reached its peak, with over twice as many settlements and over twice the built-up area as during the Parthian period. In this region, human settlement was as much as 35 times denser and more extensive than it had been under the Achaemenid kings.

During this period, both large cities and small villages increased in number and in size, while medium-sized towns decreased in percentage of all settlements compared to the Parthian era. This indicates that the growing population in large cities consisted of people who originally had come from the medium-sized towns, rather than rural population moving to large urban centers.

Under the Sassanids, the area in cultivation in the Diyala basin reached an extent that had never been attained before, and never would be again. During this time, almost 8,000 square kilometers were brought into cultivation, almost totally covering the region with farmland. A two-field crop rotation system was likely employed during this period, just as it was in Islamic times.

The Bata'ih first formed during the Sasanian era. According to al-Baladhuri, during the reign of Kavad I (r. 488–531), the Tigris overflowed its banks and flooded large areas of productive farmland. Kubadh was unable to do anything about it, but after his son Khosrow I succeeded him, he ordered the reconstruction of dykes and was able to reclaim part of the flooded land. Under Khusraw II, however, the Tigris continued to rise even higher. He spent huge sums of money to finance the restoration of the systems, but in vain. In the final years of the Sasanian empire, these projects were abandoned due to war, and local dihqans couldn't finance such major undertakings.

=== Islamic ===
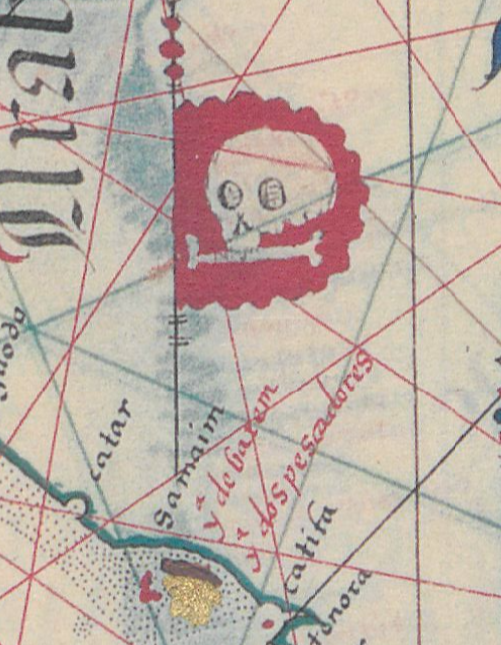
Samaim (Sawad) in the Atlas of Lázaro Luís

Archaeological evidence indicates that there was "a precipitate retreat from a vast central area of the Sawad" during this period, only reversing itself in modern times. After the golden age of the Abbasid Caliphate during the reign of Harun al-Rashid from 786 to 809, imperial revenues from the Sawad plummeted from 100 million dirhams to only 20 million by the early 10th century. The sharpest decline took place between the records of Ibn Khordadbeh in the mid-9th century and Ali ibn Isa in 915: in many formerly prosperous districts, a drop by 90% or more took place "in this period of less than a single human life span." In the intervening years, there had been several decades of rural unrest and conflict, provoked by years of increasing tax burdens and abuses by state officials, as well as outright looting by Turkish mercenaries. The single greatest precipitating event was the Abbasid civil war and Siege of Baghdad (865), which "wiped out any notion that the government's reciprocal function of protection could be honoured". (Note: Quoted in Adams, Heartland of Cities, p. 223) The Zanj rebellion lasted for 15 years before finally being quelled in 883, and the Qaramita movement that followed it was even larger and longer-lasting, leading to the area under state control shrinking dramatically and "prospects for any constructive, long-term approach to the agrarian economy diminished to the vanishing point." Contemporary sources report this as a time of administrative and economic collapse, with many villages destroyed, communications disrupted, robbery and brigandry were rampant, and cultivation was made practically impossible. By the early 10th century, 62% of settlements in the area around Baghdad had become abandoned. Yet at the same time, a movement of popular nostalgia emerged, "glorifying indigenous 'Nabataean' achievements, especially those connected with the spread of civilization and the improvement of agriculture. Even as actual conditions were deteriorating intolerably, exhaustively detailed compendiums were appearing with elaborate botanical nomenclature and careful specifications of all the procedures and requirements of good husbandry."

The intentional breaching of the Nahrawan canal by Ibn Ra'iq in 937 led to a severe water shortage in the region, leading to widespread emigration. The repercussions were felt heavily in Baghdad, since there was a desperate lack of grain leading to starvation.

== Irrigation ==
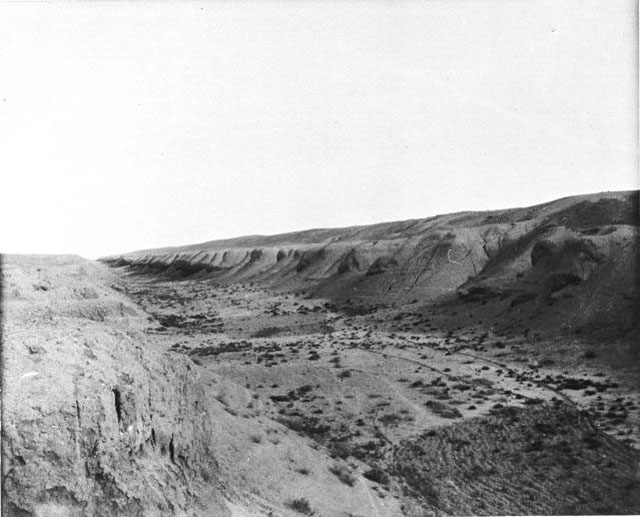
The now-dry bed of the Nahrawan Canal as it appeared near the turn of the 20th century.

The lands of the Sawad were among the most fertile in the Islamic world, but this productivity was almost totally dependent on artificial irrigation: dry farming requires 200 mm of rainfall per year, an amount reached in almost nowhere in the Sawad. Basra, for instance, has 60 mm of rainfall per year. Without irrigation, agriculture here would fail.

The amount of water used in irrigation was crucial: excessive irrigation would cause a dangerous rise in the water table, as well as enabling capillary action to bring saline water up to the surface. Too little irrigation, on the other hand, left no extra water to leach the salts that had been deposited from previous irrigation. Robert M. Adams suggested that, after the opening of the Katul al-Kisrawi made water readily available to farmers in the lower Nahrawan region, over-irrigation caused the water table to rise dramatically. Today, much of this region's soil is too saline for irrigated agriculture, and the area is largely abandoned.

A similar phenomenon occurred in the Sawad of Basra. Insufficient gradient in local irrigation systems resulted in poor drainage of salts from the soil. To counter this, laborers, including the Zanj, were tasked with removing the salty topsoil and piling it up by the sides of the canals. As many as 45 million tons of soil were moved in this manner, but even this was insufficient. After Basra itself was sacked by the Zanj and then again by the Qarmatians, much of the fields were abandoned and never brought into cultivation again.

At its apex under the late Sasanian period, the irrigation system of the Sawad must have diverted virtually the entire flow of both the Tigris and Euphrates to agricultural purposes. Regarding the Euphrates, Robert M. Adams wrote that, "with a whole series of massive diversions upstream, it is not unlikely that in Sasanian times the Euphrates entered the swamps [at its lower end]... with very little if any residual flow." (Note: Quoted in Allen and Heldring, p. 11)

=== Canals ===
Throughout its history, the Sawad was crisscrossed by many canals. In the Islamic period, most canals ran west to east, from the Euphrates to the Tigris, since water level in the Tigris was lower than that of the Euphrates. As Ya'qubi observed, the Tigris watered the area to the east of the river, whereas the area to the west of the Tigris was irrigated with waters from the Euphrates.

Due to gravity, the canals of the Sawad had to be elevated slightly above the ground. This came with significant risk: if there was a breach in the canal's banks, the water would flood surrounding fields.

The most detailed account of Islamic canals is that of Suhrāb, or Ibn Serapion.

A canal could become the center of urban activity: for example, Bilal ibn Burda lined both sides of his canal with shops and moved the local suq there. Fishing may have been done in some canals, with at least two canals being named after types of fish that lived in them. Canals could also be used to power mills or for fulling cloth.

Construction of canals was very expensive. It was often financed by private investors who expected to turn a profit out of the deal. Usually, all the governor did was provide land for irrigation projects.

=== Weirs ===
The 3rd-century AH author al-Khatib al-Baghdadi listed some 30 weirs in Iraq, although most of them were no longer extant or operational at the time he wrote. The most extensive archaeological work done on one of those weirs has been done on the Abbasid-era ash-Shadhirwan al-Asfal weir in 1957–58, which al-Khatib al-Baghdadi mentioned as serving the Nahrawan canal and which serves as a model for our understanding of how weirs were built during that period. It served to raise the water level in front of it (i.e. upstream) to a height 3 meters above the area downstream, and it supplied 11 branch canals. It consisted of a spillway, 37.56 meters wide and 30 meters deep, and made of a well-cemented mixture of lime, pebbles, limestone cherts, and small pieces of brick, all built on top of a stepped brick platform. Two abutments were built in front of the spillway, one on each side, to contain the water even during a flood. The right abutment was built more solidly than the left, and it also served as a closing wall for the pool. It was buttressed with a tower at each end and built on a raised platform at the same height as the spillway. In front of the abutments were two guide banks: the one on the right, as with the abutment on that side, helped serve as a closing wall, and the one on the left ended in a tower. The closing walls served to prevent wave action from eroding the sides of the pool to a point where the water could spill around the weir on the other side. Finally, 140 meters upstream from the spillway, there were two regulators, designed to relieve the weir during floods. The regulators were made of brick and date from the 9th century, although the arch on the right bank appears older and was probably built by the 8th century at the latest. Both regulators have vertical lines of holes, which were designed so that wooden beams could be inserted into them to hold the structures' planks in place when the sluice needed to be partially or fully closed.

=== Mechanical irrigation ===
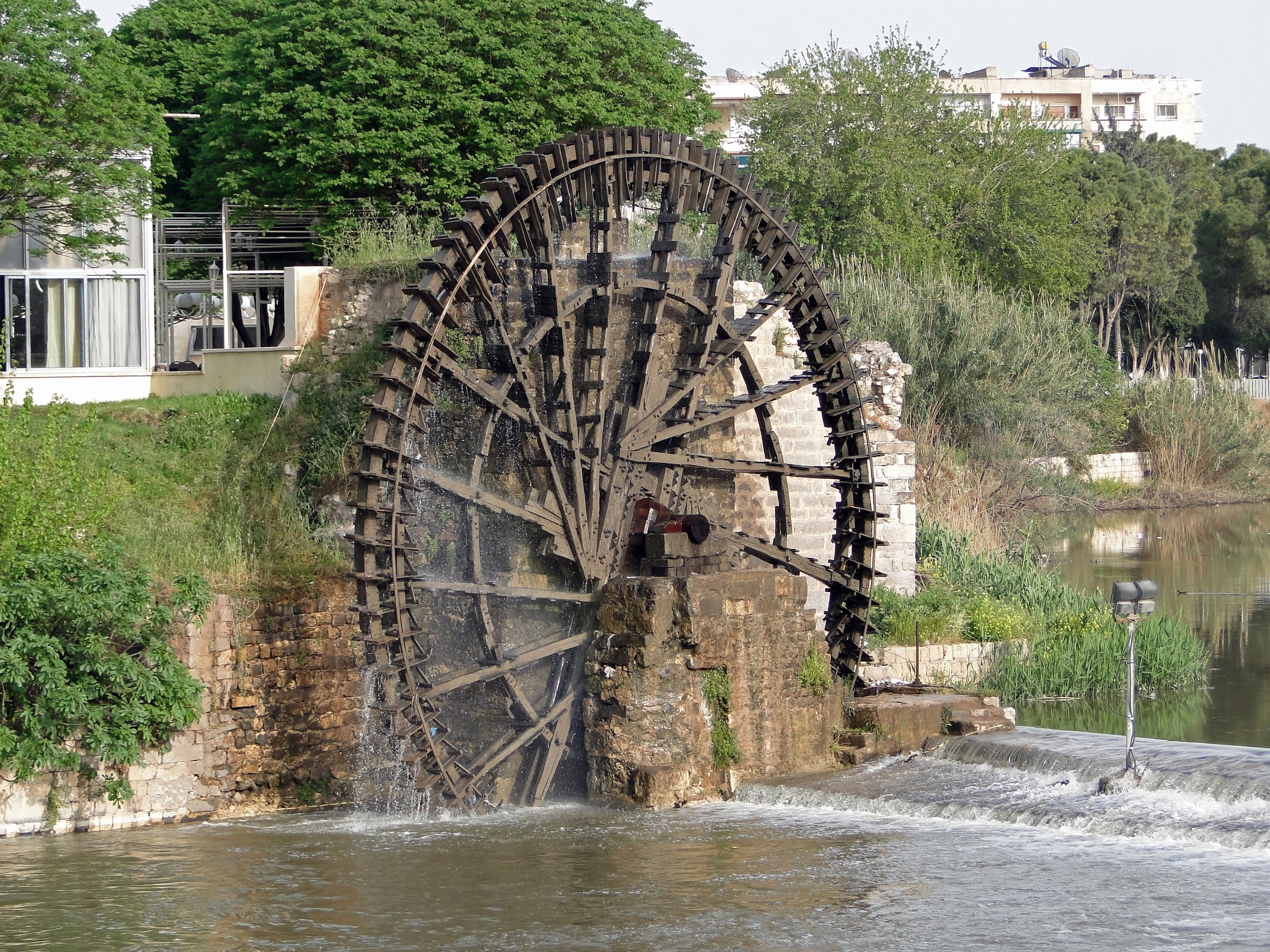
A Noria in Hama, Syria. Mechanical waterwheels like this one once carried water from rivers and canals to the fields of the Sawad.

Buzjani outlined five main mechanical devices used for irrigation purposes in the Sawad. The first, the nā'ūr, was a waterwheel powered by the flow of the stream itself. They were used extensively in the area of the Nahrawan Canal, in the region of Anbar on the Euphrates, and in the western part of the Baduraya district, west of Baghdad. The second, the dūlāb, was another type of waterwheel; it was powered by animals (typically horses or oxen, although in the area of Anbar they were powered by camels) instead of water thrust. These were commonly used around Baghdad and Anbar. The third was the daliya; it was a waterwheel powered by human labor. The fourth, the shādūf, was a bucket operated by four people; it was in use in the area of the Sarsar canal. Finally, the bakra was a simple animal-powered device used to transport water taken from wells.

=== Upkeep and administration ===
The government ministry responsible for the construction and maintenance of irrigation projects was the Diwan al-Kharaj, which was based in the capital and had branches in the provinces. It employed land surveyors and civil engineers for both construction of new projects and their maintenance.

Maintaining the vast irrigation systems of Iraq required a large number of workers. In addition to the surveyors and engineers mentioned above, there were also qaīyāsun, who supervised water levels, flow, and capacity of rivers and canals; naqqālūn, who disposed of unneeded waste; razzāmūn, who bound reeds for use in building dams; haffārūn, who dredged canals; and workers (no name given) who carried loads of soil to reinforce structures such as dams and weirs.

== Agriculture ==
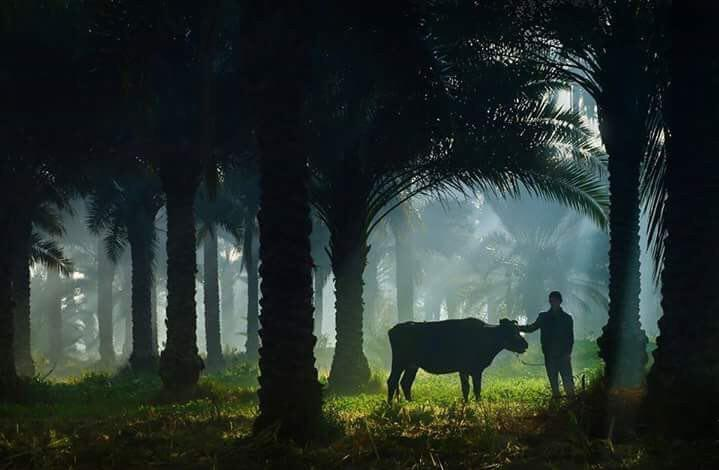
Near Basra, Iraq

Ibn Wahshiyya wrote a detailed book on agronomy called Kitab al-filaha al-Nabatiyya, or The Nabataean Agriculture, which documents many of the agricultural practices of the Sawad in the 3rd century AH.

The techniques used by farmers in the medieval Sawad were mostly the same as those used by twentieth-century Iraqi farmers. Buzjani and Ibn Wahshiyya both wrote extensively on such practices. Several different ploughs were in use, including the sikkah, or iron coulter. An instrument called the mijrad was used to level a field after it had been ploughed.

Grafting was practiced extensively: most fruit trees were grown this way rather than from seeds. Ibn Wahshiyya wrote a detailed description of the practice. Layering was done with vines if there was enough space for it.

Ibn Wahshiyya described two general types of manure used to fertilize crops in the Sawad. The first was "natural" manure, which consisted of either dried plant matter, feces (both animal and human), or ash and cinders. Ibn Wahshiyya preferred this kind. The second kind was "composite" manure, which consisted of a mixture of several types of "natural" manure along with earth and water, and was left to decompose after mixing. Different crops called for different kinds of manure, and some needed no fertilization at all. Manure was traded and sold locally, according to several sources, including Ibn Wahshiyya, Ibn Bassam, and Yaqut al-Hamawi.

The Abbasid government played a role in supervising cultivation. It would sometimes loan money to farmers to help them buy seed and livestock. Some poorer farmers were directly given seeds. The government expected repayment in full after the harvest.

At the maximum extent under the late Sasanian dynasty, the Iraqi countryside would have been under "virtually continuous cultivation", supporting a much larger population than in previous periods. During the time of the caliphs Harun al-Rashid and al-Ma'mun, the total winter acreage for cereal crops has been estimated at 3 million hectares in cultivation during a single winter. (Since land was fallowed every other year, the actual amount of land set aside for grains would have been twice that.)

=== Major crops ===
==== Wheat and barley ====
Wheat and barley were grown in every district of the Sawad. In most of these districts, the kharaj tax was paid mostly in the form of those two grains. Tabari described the four districts surrounding Baghdad as extremely productive, which is partly why the caliph al-Mansur chose Baghdad for the site of his new capital.

Breads made from wheat and barley formed the main food for most Iraqis, especially in major urban areas such as Baghdad, Wasit, Basra, and Kufa. An especially popular dish was al-tharīd, which consisted of pieces of bread with either vegetable soup or a combination of olive oil and vinegar. Dishes such as burghul, habbīya, and disheesh were made from boiled and peeled wheat. Other dishes consisted of a paste made from mashed meat and pearl wheat. Most Iraqi peasants ate more barley-based breads, which were often made with millet and beans mixed in. Additionally, a kind of alcoholic beverage was prepared from a mixture of barley and millet.

According to Ibn Wahshiyya, six different kinds of wheat were grown in the Sawad. The most important wheat-growing areas were located around Kashkar and Anbar, although both districts experienced a steep decline in wheat production by the end of the 3rd century AH.

Perhaps due to its greater resilience to the increasing soil salinity, barley was a more common crop than wheat in the medieval Sawad. Ibn Hawqal notes the region surrounding Wasit in particular as an important barley producer.

==== Rice ====
Rice was grown in the parts of the Sawad that were warm and humid – two conditions necessary for it to thrive. Qudama noted that four districts paid taxes in barley and rice instead of the usual barley and wheat, indicating that rice was a particularly widespread crop there. These districts were Sura and Barbisama, Furat Badaqla, Nistar, and Kashkar. The rice plantations around Jamida, as described by Qadi Tanukhi, constituted some of the richest rice-producing areas in the Sawad, which enticed government officials to compete for the control of the region.

Ibn Wahshiyya wrote a detailed description of the cultivation of rice in the Sawad. There were two growing seasons for rice in the Sawad: a summer season, which was entirely dependent on irrigation, and a winter season, which was supported by rainfall. Summer rice was planted during the second half of July (Tammuz) and harvested in December (Kanun al-Awwal). Winter rice, meanwhile, was planted at the beginning of January (Kanun al-Akhir) and harvested in May (Ayyar and June (Haziran). Rice farming required meticulous preparation, fertilization, irrigation, and labor for harvesting and threshing.

Rice, and particularly rice bread, was a dietary staple in southern Iraq, especially in the Bata'ih and Basra regions. Rice was often served with fish and/or vegetables. Various recipes called for rice to be cooked with milk, butter, oil, or fat, and seasoned with salt. Rice-based pastries were also eaten, and a type of rice wine called nabīdh was produced in many districts, including Abdasi, Badaraya, Bakusaya, and Junhula. Rice bread, like barley, was cheaper than wheat bread, which resulted in it gaining a reputation as being food for poor people. Nonetheless, rice remained the single most important food for many people, especially the poor, in southern Iraq due to its low price.

==== Other cereals ====
Described as a summer crop by Ibn Wahshiyya, sorghum (dhura) was grown in large quantities throughout Iraq. Bread made from sorghum flour, especially when mixed with wheat and barley flour, was regarded more highly by Southern Iraqis than rice bread. Sorghum was also grown for use as fodder; Ibn Wahshiyya considered it the ideal fodder for livestock, especially cows and goats.

Oats, rye, and millet were also grown for use as fodder in the Sawad. Ibn Wahshiyya recorded the nahiyahs of Saqī dijla, Asfal iqlīm Bābil, Jūkhī, and al-Jarāmiqa as producing these crops in large quantities. Ibn Khordadbeh wrote that, in the Rustuqbadh district, millet was used alongside barley to pay taxes, indicating its local importance. Alfalfa and clover were also grown as fodder as well as to replenish soils, but their importance appears to have declined after the second century AH.

==== Textile crops: cotton, flax, and hemp ====
The most important textile crop in Iraq, cotton was especially cultivated in the Sawad of Basra. Ibn Wahshiyya considered the ideal soil for growing cotton to be clayey and free of salt. It was sown between late April and late May, and harvested in June and July.

Flax (kattān) was especially grown in the central part of the Sawad, where, besides being used for textiles, it also formed a dietary staple; flaxseed flour was used to make bread. Flaxseed oil was also used to light lamps.

Hemp was grown both for its textile use as well as for hashish. It was planted in late February and in March, and harvested in June. Hemp was woven into a rough but durable cloth; its fibers were also used to make ropes.

==== Dates ====
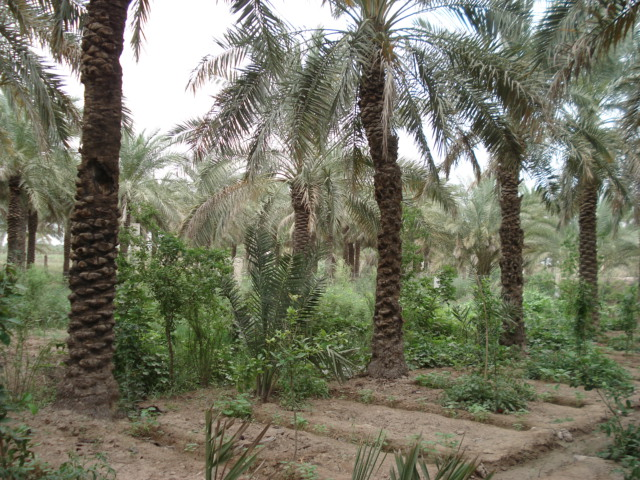
Contemporary date palm orchard at al-Faw, near Basra

In much of the Sawad, the date was a crucial crop, almost as important as cereals like wheat, barley, and rice. Basra alone grew 300 varieties at the time of Caliph Al-Mu'tasim. In the Sawad of Basra, dates were the main dietary staple for much of the population. Dates were not only eaten plain: they were used in producing a strong type of vinegar as well as various beverages, and, despite Islamic prohibition, they were used to make a type of intoxicant. Ibn Wahshiyya praises the myriad uses of the date palm, remarking that every part of the tree was useful – it provided timber for construction, its fronds could be used to make furniture as well as boats, and it produced a sweet syrup that was highly valued.

Contemporary financial records seem to imply that the palm trees themselves were exceptionally spread out in early Islamic orchards. The tax schedules say that date orchards paid 5–10 dirhams per jarib in taxes, which at a rate of 1/2 dirham per ordinary tree and 1 dirham per finer "Persian" tree implies a density of about 95 date palms per hectare. Today, on the other hand, the typical practice in the area around Basra is to pack 450 trees into a hectare. The Neo-Babylonian standard of 227 trees per hectare is also much denser. The apparent low density of early Islamic date palm orchards remains an unsolved problem. It's possible, however, that this is just an artifact of how the contemporary taxes were set: they may have been intentionally set low in order to encourage more date palm production, and that in practice the actual density was much higher.

==== Grapes ====
These were used to produce raisins and currants.

==== Citrus ====
At first only the citron was grown in Iraq, with Ibn Wahshiyya and al-Dinawari each distinguishing between two varieties of citron: sweet (aṭrunj ḥulū) and bitter (aṭrunj ḥāmuḍ). Later, in the early 4th century AH, citrus trees such as the lemon, orange, and bitter orange were introduced to Iraq from India.

==== Other fruits ====
According to Ibn Miskawayh, melons and watermelons were the most popular fruit in Iraqi markets. Ibn Wahshiyya wrote that they were widely cultivated in Iraq and listed eight different varieties of them, but said that it would be difficult to list all the varieties grown at the time.

Figs were another commonly grown fruit. The district of Hulwan was especially known for growing figs. Al-Dinawari distinguished between four basic types of figs: bustānī, grown in gardens and orchards; barrī, or wild; sahlī, grown in flat areas; and jabalī, grown in the mountains. He also described ten different specific varieties of fig, with varying size, taste, and color.

Ibn Wahshiyya listed the following as fruits grown widely in most parts of Iraq during his lifetime: apricots, peaches, pears, prunes, damsons, quinces, apples, pippins, bananas, mulberries, black mulberries, raspberries, blackberries, and olives.

==== Herbs ====
These included mint, chicory, capers, fennel, dill, parsley, sage, basil, etc.

==== Other crops ====
Plants grown for use in dyes included madder (fuwwah), which produced a red dye, saffron (za'farān), which produced a yellow-orange dye, indigo (nīla), which produced a deep blue dye, and henna, which produced a dark orange dye and was also used for cosmetics.

Asparagus was introduced to Iraq from the Jordan valley, and was grown in the regions of Bājarmā, Saqī Jūkhā, Bābil, and Khaṭarnīyya.

Sesame was grown to make sesame oil, which in Iraq was far more widespread than olive oil. Ibn Wahshiyya warned that sesame should not be grown in back-to-back years because doing so would deplete the soil's nutrients. Al-Muqaddasi described the environs of Tikrit as ideal for sesame cultivation. Wasit was also an important sesame producer in the early 4th century AH.

Various types of flowers were grown, mainly for use in medicine. Ibn Wahshiyya singled out roses in particular; they were used to make rose oil and rosewater.

Ibn Wahshiyya also enumerates 35 different kinds of "unfruitful trees" which were planted to supply wood.

=== Soil replenishment ===
In order to protect against excessive salt or water buildup in the soil, farmers would leave fields uncultivated for a while, allowing deep-rooted weeds like shuk and aqul to grow there naturally. These weeds would draw out water from the soil and cause it to dry out, thus creating a dry subsoil below the root area and above the water table. When the field was irrigated the next year, the water would seep down into the dry layer and take any salts from the surface with it. Down there, the salts would become "trapped" and prevented from being brought up to the surface by capillary action. Another method farmers used involved planting a field with barley and then, after the harvest, having ritab (clover) grow there without irrigation. This also had a similar effect, and had the added benefit of nitrogen fixation. However, this could not be repeated indefinitely—eventually, the salt concentration would become too high, preventing any plants from growing, and that land would have to be abandoned (although this was far from the only reason that land was abandoned in medieval Iraq).

=== Animal husbandry ===
Much of the meat consumed in Baghdad would have come from the steppes of northern Iraq, but some would also have come from the Sawad as well. Southern Iraq does not have any natural pastures, so the livestock raised here had to be fed grain. In addition, they could partly be fed with stubble or fallow lands, as well as some limited and tightly controlled grazing from young barley shoots. Another important source is uncultivated land, but as the total cultivated area expanded under the Sasanians to reach almost the maximum potential capacity, the availability of this land for grazing shrank, likely bringing people and livestock into direct competition for resources.

== Industry ==
During the Sasanian period, and probably continuing into the Early Islamic period, large-scale industrial operations were carried out even in the countryside, far from the major cities. For example, one newly-dug Sasanian canal in the area north of Uruk was studded with sites that specialized in glass manufacturing. At these sites today, there are vast mounds, hundreds of meters long, consisting mainly of glass slag. There are also numerous remains of what were once glass furnaces. This indicates the large scale of the glass industry here. Where the raw materials serving this industry came from is unknown, but Robert M. Adams provided one possible explanation: by late Sasanian times, the area to the south of this canal was increasingly becoming part of the great swamp. Here, there would have been large numbers of snails as a source of calcium carbonate (they are still found in swampy areas around here today in "almost unbelievable numbers"). Plants native to the area may have supplied sodium carbonate, and sand may have been supplied from here as well, deposited by the water.

== Taxation ==
In the year 105 AH (723–4 CE), the caliph Yazid II commissioned Umar Ibn Hubayra to undertake a general land survey of the Sawad, in order to make the taxation of the Sawad more centralized. Taxpayers resented this land survey.

In practice, tax collectors often took far more than the official rate. According to Jahshiyari, in some cases, tax farmers demanded a payment greater than a farmer's entire harvest for the year, driving them to seek protection from higher officials. Abu Yusuf condemned the injustices against taxpayers in the Sawad, saying that tax farmers were breaking the law for their own financial benefit. He said that they "rob the taxpayer by imposing on them taxes they do not owe and punish them in repulsive ways to secure their own profit". Tax farmers often tortured people who refused to comply with their demands. Abu Yusuf describes some of these tortures. Tax farmers would severely beat taxpayers, or make them stand out in the hot sun on one foot for a long time. The punishments for defaulters were even more severe: tax collectors would hang heavy stones or buckets filled with water around their necks, or tie them up with ropes and left to starve. Yet, despite these condemnations, the punishments and torture continued for a long time thereafter, sometimes even with official sanction. In 847, Muhammad ibn Abdul-Malik al-Zayiyat, the vizier for the caliph al-Mutawakkil, introduced a "furnace of iron which had protruding nails inside it" to be used to punish tax evaders.

=== Types of taxes ===
At first, the terms that would come to be used for various types of taxes were not clearly distinguished. The words jizya, kharaj, sadaqa, and zakat were often used interchangeably in early Islamic writings. At one point in the Qur'an, the term kharāj is used to refer to wages. The early caliph Umar I at one point used the term "jizya lands" to refer to the concept that would later become known as kharaj lands, and in one instance, the farmers of the Sawad apparently requested that their tax payments be changed from jizya to sadaqa. Over the centuries, however, a distinction emerged between these terms.

The main forms of land tax at the time were the kharaj and the ushr. The jizya tax was also important for non-Muslim peasants in the Sawad.

==== Kharaj ====
Originally, the kharaj tax was supposed to represent a tax on the land of non-Muslims. However, over time, as the dihqans either sold their lands to Muslims or themselves converted to Islam, the status of kharaj land also applied to Muslims. The Umayyad caliph Umar II established a policy that, if a landlord converted to Islam, he would no longer have to pay the jizya tax but would still have to pay kharaj. (Abbasid-period writers attributed this policy to the Rashidun caliph Umar I, as a way of giving it more legitimacy, since the Umayyads had become infamous under the Abbasids.)

From the time of the caliph al-Mahdi, the standard implementation of the kharaj tax in the Sawad came in the form of sharecropping, with the tax rate being 50% of the crops grown on kharaj land. This rate was maintained by the caliph Harun al-Rashid, although his advisor Abu Yusuf urged him to lower it. It was lowered to 40% under the caliph al-Ma'mun, but it appears that this reduction's implementation was highly flawed, as many farmers filed complaints over the matter. This 40% tax rate was maintained at least nominally, but in practice, new taxes were introduced that cancelled out the reduction.

==== 'Ushr ====
The ushr tax was a tax on the agricultural output of lands owned by Muslims. The rate on this tax was usually lower than that of the kharaj, at 10% to 25%, but under the caliphs al-Wathiq and al-Mutawakkil, it rose to as much as 50%. The ushr tax was regarded as illegitimate by Islamic jurists at the time, but nonetheless it remained an integral part of the government's tax policy.

Most of the Basra Sawad was classified as ushr land because it had been reclaimed by Muslims shortly after the conquest of Iraq. In the Batiha area, the land had been reclaimed via drainage, and in the Ṣibākh area, it had been reclaimed by clearing the silt. Much of this process was described in detail by al-Baladhuri.

Over time, the distinction between kharaj lands and ushr lands became blurred, and eventually the two categories were merged into one category, which kept the name kharaj. This merger appears to have taken place during the reign of the caliph al-Mu'tasim.

==== Jizya ====
The jizya was a tax collected from all adult male non-Muslims in the Sawad. Only in Baghdad, however, did the jizya constitute a separate tax. In other parts of Iraq, the jizya was collected as an addition to the ordinary kharaj tax.

==== Hadaya ====
The hadāyā, or "gifts", had originated under Sasanian rule. It had been collected from the peasants twice a year and spent to buy gifts for the king during the festivals of Nowruz and Mihrijan. This tax was abolished by Umar I, but it was restored by Uthman and maintained by Ali ibn Abi Talib. Under the caliph Mu'awiya I, its value rose to as much as 50 million dirhams annually. The hadaya was abolished a second time by Umar II; prior to this, its value was estimated to be as much as that of all other taxes combined. However, it appears that this tax was again reinstated at some point, since Abu Yusuf urged Harun al-Rashid to abolish it. The governors of eastern Abbasid provinces gave hadaya to the caliph in the form of rare and valuable items made by local artisans from their province. For the festival of Nowruz in 282 AH, Abshihi records a gift-giving of this nature to the caliph al-Mu'tamid, indicating that the hadaya may have continued even through this period.

==== Muqasama ====
A new system of taxation was introduced under the Abbasid caliph al-Mahdi, at the behest of the Muslims of Iraq. Under this new system, which was called muqāsama, people paid taxes in the form of a portion of their crops, rather than a fixed amount of money or crops. The rate was 50% for land irrigated by flooding, 33% for land irrigated by waterwheels, and 25% for land irrigated by animal-powered wheels. According to al-Tabari, the caliph al-Ma'mun introduced a temporary reduction of the rate, from the common 50% to 40%. The muqāsama system was introduced with the support of Abu Ubayd Allah, the vizier under al-Mahdi who authored the first book on kharaj. Abu Ubayd Allah stressed the importance of keeping in mind the financial needs of the taxpayers, and argued that a fixed tax would cause problems for taxpayers due to changes in prices. A key reason he and other officials supported this new system of taxation was that, this way, landlords would share the risk with the government in case of a bad harvest, thus reducing conflict between the state and the landed elite. Another reason was because, under the 'alā l-misāḥa system, independent grain merchants had a great deal of control over prices; by switching to the muqāsama system, the state could increase its control of the grain market in Iraq, where it needed to supply the most important cities in the caliphate.

== Administrative divisions ==
The accounts of Qudama ibn Ja'far and Ibn Khordadbeh describe the general administrative setup of the 9th-century Sawad. It was divided into 12 districts (astān; there were only 10 at Ibn Khordadbeh's time), each of which consisted of several sub-districts (tassūj). There were 60 tassujs in total (48 at Ibn Khordadbeh's time). Many of these divisions bear Sasanian names, indicating that they had originally been established before the Islamic conquest of Iraq.

Administrative divisions of the 9th-century Sawad (from El-Samarraie, 1970)
Astan	Tassujs
Shadh-Fayruz (aka Hulwan)	Fayruz-Qubadh; al-Jabal; Tamarra; Arbil; Khanaqin
Shadh Hurmuz	Buzurjisabur; Nahr Buq; Kalwadha and Nahr Bin; Jazir; al-Madinah al-ʽAtiqah; Radhan al-Aʽla; Radhan al-Asfal
Shadh-Qubadh	Rustuqbadh; Mahrudh; Silsil; Jalawla and Jabilta; al-Dhaybayn; al-Bandanijan; Baraz al-Ruz; al-Daskarah; al-Rustaqayn
Bazijan-Khusraw (aka al-Nahrawan)	al-Nahrawan al-Aʽla; al-Nahrawan al-Awsat; al-Nahrawan al-Asfal; Iskaf and Jarjaraya; Badaraya; Bakusaya
Shadh-Sabur (aka Kaskar)	al-Zandaward; al-Tharthur; al-Astan; al-Jawazir
Shadh-Bahman	Bahman-Ardashir; Maysan; Dasti-Maysan (al-Ubullah); Abz-Qubadh
al-ʽAli	Fayruz-Sabur (al-Anbar); Maskin; Qatrabbul; Baduraya
Ardashir-Babakan	Bahurasir; al-Rumaqan; Kutha; Nahr Durqit; Nahr Jawbar
Bih-Dhiumasufan (aka al-Zawabi)	al-Zab al-Aʽla; al-Zab al-Awsat; al-Zab al-Asfal
Bih-Qubadh al- Aʽla	Babil; Khutarniyah; al-Fallujah al-ʽUlya; al-Fallujah al-Sufla; al-Nahrayn; ʽAyn al-Tamr
Bih-Qubadh al-Awsat	Jubba and al-Budat; Sura and Barbisama; Barusama; Nahr al-Malik (including al-Sayibayn; possibly combined with Barusama as a single tassuj)
Bih-Qubadh al-Asfal	Furat-Badaqla; al-Saylahayn; Tistar; Rudhmastan (possibly a separate diyaʽ belonging to multiple tassujs); Hurmuzjird (possibly a separate diyaʽ belonging to multiple tassujs)

== Society ==
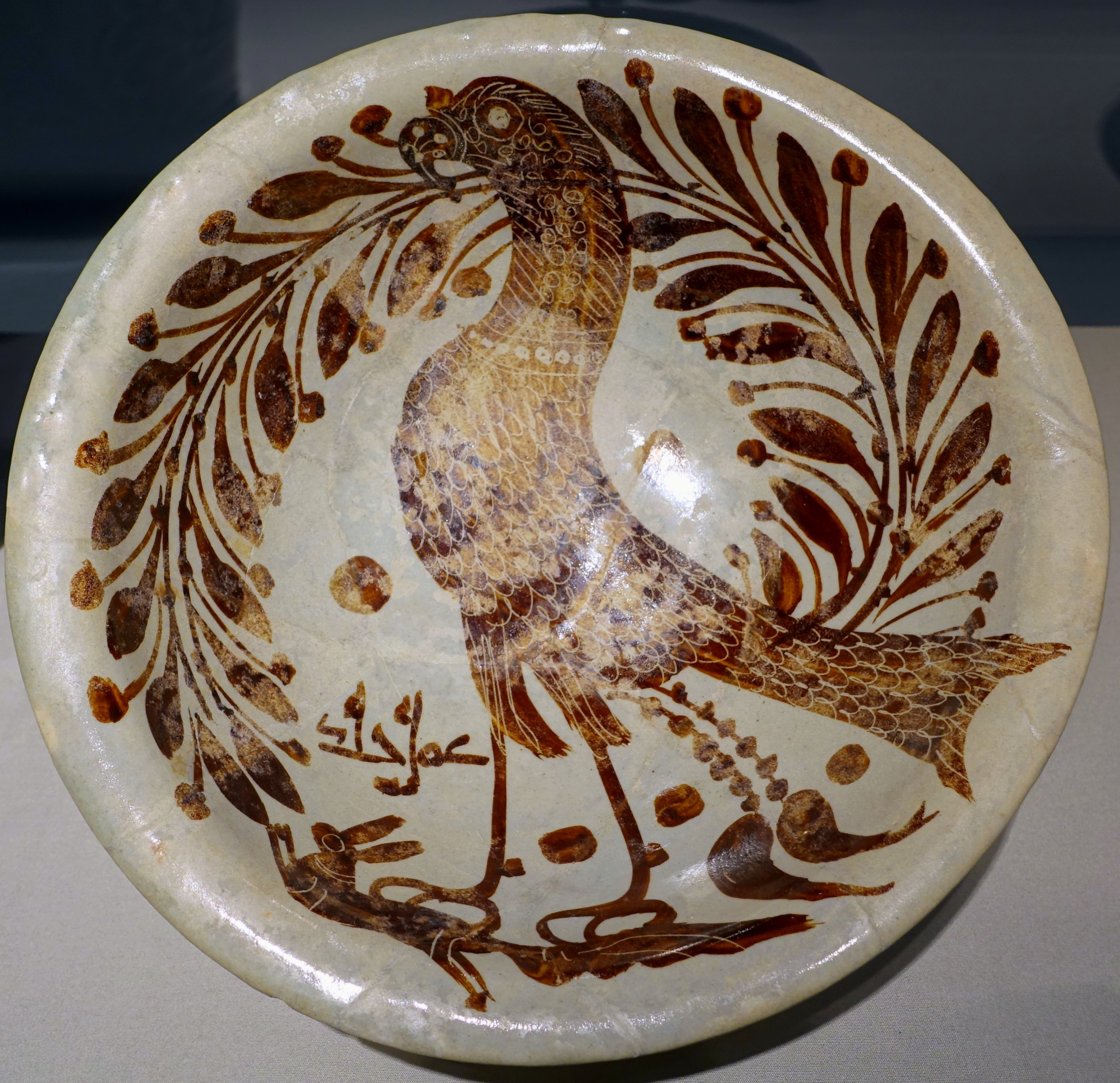
Abbasid-era bowl, 9th–10th century CE

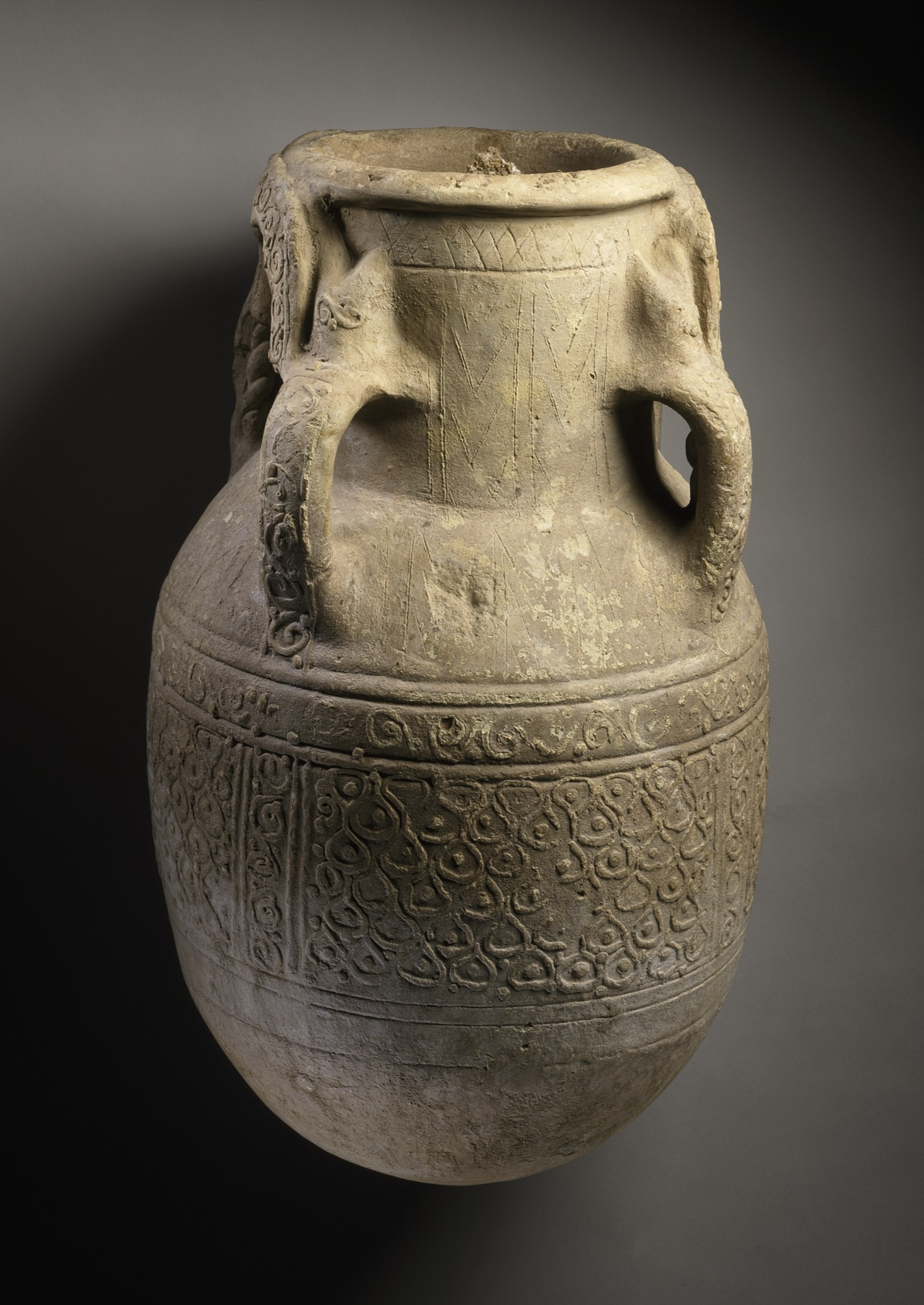
12th-century Iraqi earthenware water jar

The total rural population of the medieval Sawad can be calculated from the extent of the farmland. Assuming 3 million hectares of winter cereal crops in the late 8th/early 9th century, and the ability of a person to reap 3 hectares during the 2-month-long harvest season using contemporary technology, the total labor requirement would have been 1 million people. Assuming an average family size of 4 people, the total agricultural population of rural Iraq at that time would have been 4 million people. This is in addition to an assumed non-agricultural population in Iraq (also including cities) of 1.8 million.

Under this model, the hypothetical annual net output per worker would be 2757 kg of grain. An average agricultural family of 4 is assigned a subsistence income of 1000 kg of grain per year, which would be equivalent to 154 dirhams per year, or 13 per month. This means that out of net production, 36% was kept by the peasants, while taxes were 26% and rents were 38%. Thus almost 2/3 of the Sawad's total net production went to supporting the urban population and upper classes.

From the Sasanians to the Abbasids, the peasants of the Sawad formed "a legally subordinate class, working the estates of large landlords, and from which surplus in the form of taxes, rents, and labor were extracted".

The jurist Sharik wrote that "the inhabitants of the Sawad are servants and slaves."

Most of the inhabitants of the Sawad were called "Nabataeans". Although they converted to Islam, they maintained many pre-Islamic traditions and spoke a distinct dialect of Arabic.

According to Ibn Wahshiyya and Sabi, almost all the landlords of the Sawad lived in larger cities and towns, with their representatives, called al-quwam or al-wuhata maintaining the landlord's rural properties. These agents were responsible for overseeing daily work, providing necessities like seed and farm tools, and potentially hiring additional workers if needed. Alfred von Kremer compared this system with that of the Roman latifundia.

Slavery was practiced extensively in the Sawad. According to Umar's policy, any freeman was allowed to sell his Nabataean neighbor as a slave if they were in dire financial straits; this policy was upheld by the caliph al-Ma'mun. According to Abu Ubayd, however, Umar I banned the purchase of dhimmi serfs because they were ahl al-karaj: subject to payment of the kharaj land tax.

The dihqans, or village chiefs, formed the lowest rung of the Sasanian landed elite. They remained after the Islamic conquest, with their village estates formed "the prevailing form of land-tenure in post-conquest Iraq." The government frequently consulted them on matters concerning land and irrigation, as well as for help with collecting taxes; the dihqans' local knowledge made them essential for this purpose. In return, they were allowed to collect a special tax on local cultivators. However, their importance began to decrease with the rise of new Arab landowners, including Sasanian urban and military converts to Islam and their descendants; this process happened gradually, over the course of 60 or 70 years.

Under Persian rule, the Persian settlement had been heaviest in the area east of the Tigris, as well as in certain garrison cities.

Contemporary writers did not provide any extensive descriptions of rural villages. Ibn Wahshiyya gave only some details: he wrote that villages should be built on elevated ground such as hillocks, and if this was not naturally available then he said an artificial elevation should be built from wood and mud. This served two purposes: the first, he said, was for better health, and the second was to provide an elevated lookout point over the surrounding fields. Houses were built from either baked or sun-dried bricks, with high walls and many openings to provide ventilation and let sunlight in. (The walls were high to make space for all the openings.) Tree trunks were used either for columns or as rafters to support the ceilings, and the ceilings themselves were lined with wood from tamarisk, cypress, pine, and walnut trees and then covered with a mixture of mud and straw. Ibn Wahshiyya also described how plaster was used to cover walls and floors, especially in rooms and buildings used for storage. He said that isolated, independently standing houses were best, but if space was tight then they could be built adjoining each other as long as the necessary ventilation was provided. He also stressed the necessity of a blacksmith, carpenter, and potter in each village to supply residents with everyday items or building materials.

Ibn Wahshiyya disapproved of the unsanitary methods of obtaining drinking water that were prevalent in the Sawad: people would dig holes or use natural slopes to collect rainwater in ponds without making sure that either the ground or the water itself was clean—cattle manure was even used to cement the sides of the ponds. He said that these practices should be abolished and prescribed that drinking water should instead be provided by being collected on clean roofs of houses, and then directed down the sides of the houses into a cistern by wooden gutters.

== Sources ==
- Schaeder, H.H. (1997). "Sawād". In Bosworth, C. E.; van Donzel, E.; Heinrichs, W. P. & Lecomte, G. (eds.). The Encyclopaedia of Islam, Second Edition. Volume IX: San–Sze. Leiden: E. J. Brill. p. 87. ISBN 978-90-04-10422-8.
- Michele Campopiano, “Land Tax Alā l-misāḥa and muqāsama: Legal Theory and Balance of Social Forces in Early Medieval Iraq (Sixth to Eighth Centuries)”, in Journal of the Economic and Social History of the Orient, 54/2, 2011, 239–269
