= Al-Hai District =

- District
- Location within Iraq
- Country: Iraq
- Governorate: Wasit Governorate
- Seat: Al-Hay
- Time zone: UTC+3 (AST)

Al-Hai District (Arabic: قضاء الحي, romanized: Kaza Al-Hai) is a district of the Wasit Governorate, Iraq. Its seat is the city of Al-Hay.
