= Muhammad Jamil Al-Mayahi =

Iraqi politician (born 1983)

Mohammed Jamil Al-Mayahi
- Born: 1983; Iraq
- Notable work: Governor of Wasit Governorate in Iraq

Muhammad Jamil Al-Mayahi (Arabic محمد جميل المياحي) also known as Muhammad Jamil Oudeh Al-Gharibawi, was born in Iraq in Wasit Governorate in Al-Hayy district in 1983. He is one of the leaders of the National Wisdom Movement in Wasit Governorate in Iraq. He was elected as the governor of Wasit governorate by the Wasit provincial council on 13 November 2018 to succeed the resigned Mahmoud Abd Al-Reda Talal, who won as a deputy in the parliament in its current session.

Mayahi resigned on 23 July 2025 following criticism over the government's response to the 2025 Kut shopping mall fire.
