= Al-Suwaira District =

Al-Suwaira District قضاء الصويرة
- District
- Location within Iraq
- Country: Iraq
- Governorate: Wasit Governorate
- Seat: Al-Suwaira
- Time zone: UTC+3 (AST)

Al-Suwaira District (Arabic: قضاء الصويرة, romanized: Kaza Al-Suwaira) is part of the Wasit Governorate in eastern Iraq and is about 35 km south-east of Baghdad. The Tigris runs through it. Famous for its fruit and palm orchards, its seat is the city of Al-Suwaira. Shaykh Mazhar Air Base is roughly 13 km west of the city of Al-Suwaira.
