= Ibn Jonayd Eskafi =

Shia Muslim scholar from fourth century AH

Ibn al-Junayd al-Iskafi
- ابن الجنيد الإسكافي

Personal life
- Born: around 902-3 CE Iskaf, Iraq
- Main interest(s): Ḥadīth, Kalam

Religious life
- Religion: Islam
- Denomination: Shia
- Jurisprudence: Ja'fari
- Creed: Twelver

Muslim leader
- Teacher: Hamid ibn Ziyad al-Dahqan, al-'Assimi
- Students: Al-Shaykh al-Mufid, Ahmad ibn Ali al-Najashi, Ibn al-Ghada'iri

Ibn al-Junayd al-Eskafi (Arabic: ابن الجنيد الإسكافي, romanized: Ibn al-Junayd al-Iskāfī) was a prominent Twelver Shia Muslim jurist and mutakallim (theologian) during the tenth century (fourth century after Hijrah). He lived during the period of Minor Occultation (al-ghayba al-sughra) between 874 and 941, and was one of the teachers of Al-Shaykh al-Mufid.

== Early life ==
Abu Ali Muhammad ibn Ahmad al-Katib al-Iskafi (tenth century AD/fourth century lunar) was born in Iskaf, a region near Nahrawan Canal in Iraq. His date of birth is uncertain. He may have traveled to Nishapur. He may have visited Muhammed Ibn Hosein Alavi. According to Shaykh Mufid's sayings, it seems that Ibn Jonayd passed most of his life in Baghdad. He may have had communication with the twelfth Imam.

== Jurisprudence ==
He took a different approach in understanding Shia traditions. He believed in a theological basis for interpretation of Hadith. He believed that a jurist can commit to khabarun wahid (traditions with a single chain of transmission) and qiyas (syllogism) in jurisprudence. He acted like antecedent jurists such as Fazl ibn Shazan and Younes ibn Abdul Rahman. One of his characteristics in Fiqh discussion was that he believed to Ihtiyat (probability) approximately in most problems. in other words, the principle of Ihtiyyat is prevalent in his juridical works. He employed other ideas in shia jurisprudence such as:

- Acting according to reason and justification
- Clarity in explaining the reason for a judgment
- Establish dynamic basic for shia jurisprudence

== Works ==
He had special skill in writing and became known as Katib by scholars. He wrote nearly in all Islamic sciences, particularly jurisprudence, theology and apologetics, such as:

- Tahzib Al Shia for Ahkam-e-shariah(purification of shia for religion's judgments)
- Al Nosrah Le Ahkam Al Itrat
- Two thousand problems in Shariah
- Traditions of Sshia
- Tabserat A Aref and Naqd Al Zaef
- Kashf Al Asrar

He also wrote about the art of writing: Ilm Al Nijabah Fi Ilm Al Kitabah and Al Tahrir va Taqrir.

== See also ==
- Ibn Fahd Helli
- Principles of Islamic jurisprudence
