= Dujaila =

Dujaila may refer:

- Battle of Dujaila, 1916 battle between Ottoman and British forces near Kut, Iraq.
- Dujaila River, an irrigation canal stemming from the Tigris.
- Dujaila depression, the natural feature that the above are named after.
