= 2025 Kut shopping mall fire =

Fire in Kut, Iraq

- Date: 16 July 2025
- Time: c. 8:00 p.m. AST (UTC+03:00)
- Duration: 12 hours
- Venue: Corniche Hypermarket
- Location: Kut, Wasit Governorate, Iraq; 32.5125°N 45.8189°E
- Type: Structural fire
- Cause: Under investigation
- Deaths: 69–77
- Injuries: ≥200
- Missing: 11+

On 16 July 2025, a fire broke out at a shopping centre in the city of Kut, located in Wasit Governorate, eastern Iraq. The incident occurred at the Hyper Mall, a five-story commercial building. At least 69 people were confirmed dead, while 11 others were reported missing. Hundreds of people sustained injuries of varying degrees. The fire started during business hours and spread rapidly through the building.

== Background ==
The mall had opened five days before the fire. Residents of Kut said the building lacked fire safety measures, including emergency exit stairways, fire extinguishers and fire alarms. Iraqi officials stated that the building had a poor health and safety record. A provincial official said the building originally housed a restaurant which had been shut down due to standard safety violations, noting it was unclear how the building's owners obtained permission to convert it into a multistory mall with a restaurant on the top floor.

== Fire ==
The governor of the Wasit Governorate, Muhammad Jamil Al-Mayahi, stated that fires broke out in a hypermarket and a restaurant where families were gathered for dinner. At the time, hundreds of people were inside. Initial reports suggested the fire started on the first floor. Survivors and a security official said the fires broke out after an air conditioning unit caught fire and exploded in a perfume shop. The firefighters rescued a number of people as well as made efforts to extinguish the fire. Three days of mourning were announced and an immediate investigation of the incident whose results will be released by 48 hours. Lawsuit actions were taken against the owner of the building and restaurant.

At least 69 people were confirmed by officials to have been killed, mostly women and children, and 11 others were reported missing in the fires, with hundreds injured. Iraqi television reports said the death toll was 77. Of the 69 victims' nationalities, 59 were identified as Iraqis and one other was identified as a foreign national. As of July 17, the death toll was expected to rise as bodies remained unrecovered. Officials said the high death toll was due to the use of highly flammable building materials and a lack of emergency exits, in violation of local health and safety regulations. Among the dead were 14 unidentified charred bodies. A medical source said 43 people were injured with many unidentified bodies. Most of the victims suffocated in the bathrooms while a man said five of his family members died on a lift. Dozens of injured victims with severe burns were transported to the al-Zahraa Teaching Hospital. It was reported that more than 100 people were either missing or injured, with a higher number of injured. More than 45 people were rescued by civil defence teams.

Videos on social media circulated about several floors of a five-story building under the blaze with people standing on the roof as firefighters continued their operation overnight.

== Aftermath ==
On 20 July, dozens of protesters gathered outside of the Wasit Provincial Council building in central Kut.

On 23 July, Muhammad Jamil Al-Mayahi resigned as governor following criticism over the government's response to the fire.

On 26 July, Wasit governor Hadi Al-Hamashi announced that the building was scheduled for demolition after legal formalities are completed due to being unsafe. Residents were urged to avoid going near the building.

== Investigation ==
The cause of the fire was not immediately known, but initial results from an investigation was expected to be released within 48 hours. Iraqi Prime Minister Mohammed Shia' al-Sudani inspected the shopping mall. The Federal Authority for Civil Aviation began investigating the circumstances of the fire on July 17. They diagnosed the lack of an integrated fire extinguishing system, which caused the fire to engulf the other floors. The lack of emergency exits exacerbated the results noting the lack of follow-up by the Civil Defense Directorate on the fire extinguishing system upon the center's opening. The Iraqi Ministry of Interior temporarily suspended 17 employees and detained three officers. In the aftermath of the fire, the Ministry of Interior announced they had closed 610 projects and facilities across various governorates for violating safety violations as a part of efforts to enhance security and safety to prevent similar incidents.

== See also ==
- 2021 Baghdad hospital fire
- 2023 Qaraqosh wedding fire
