= Shaykh Mazhar Air Base =

Location
- Location of Shaykh Mazhar Air Base, Iraq
- Coordinates: 32°56′25″N 044°38′04″E

Shaykh Mazhar Air Base, known today as As Suwayrah Air Base (in Arabic: قاعدة الصويرة) is a former Iraqi Air Force base in the Wasit Governorate of Iraq approximately 46 kilometers (28.5 mi) southwest of Baghdad, and about 13 kilometers (8 mi) west of the city of Al-Suwaira. It was captured by U.S.-led Coalition forces during Operation Iraqi Freedom in 2003 and was called Camp Zulu while under American control. The air base was transferred to the Iraqi army on August 21, 2005.

== Overview ==
Shaykh Mazhar Air Base was one of several Iraqi Air Force airfields in the mid-1970s which were re-built under project "Super-Base" in response to the experiences from the Six-Day War in 1967 and the Arab-Israeli War of 1973.

Very little is known about this facility, except that it was operational already in the early 1980s, and usually had at least a squadron of MiG-21s or MiG-23s, which were instrumental in the defence of Baghdad against Iranian air raids. Nevertheless, together with Ubaydah Bin Al Jarrah Air Base, Salman Pak was in the middle of an area full of military installations - including several ammunition depots (also two used for storage of chemical weapons at earlier times) - and during the 1990s it had a squadron of Shenyang F-7 and MiG-23 fighters.

The base was heavily attacked by Coalition aircraft during Operation Desert Storm in January 1991, and seized by Coalition ground forces in February 1991. It was abandoned by the Iraqi Air Force after the ceasefire in late February.

=== Restoration ===
In conjunction with their order for KAI T-50 Golden Eagle aircraft, the Iraqi Air Force ordered the restoration of the base. As with many of its facilities, the new Iraqi Air Force discarded the pre-2003 name and adopted the name As Suwayrah Air Base.
