= Dujayl =

Dujayl or Dujail ("Little Tigris") is the diminutive of Dijla, the Arabic name for the Tigris. It may refer to:

- Dujaila River, an irrigation canal in Kut, Iraq
- Dujayl Canal, an ancient irrigation canal in central Iraq
- Dujail, a town in Iraq and the seat of Dujail District
  - Dujail Massacre which took place in the town
- The medieval Arabic name for the Karun
