= Kut District =

- District
- Interactive map of Kut District
- Country: Iraq
- Governorate: Wasit Governorate
- Seat: Kut
- Time zone: UTC+3 (AST)

Kut District (Arabic: قضاء الكوت, romanized: Kaza Al-Kut) is a district of the Wasit Governorate, in eastern Iraq. The city of Kut is in Wasit.
