= Badra, Iraq =

Town in eastern Iraq

Badra
- Town
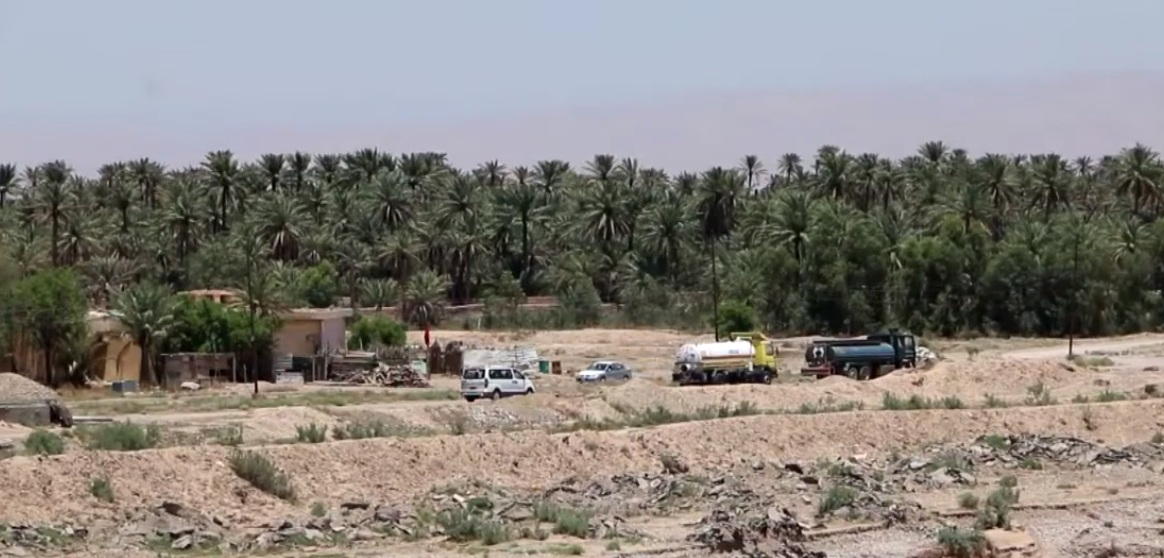
- Suburb of Badra, 2018.

- Location in Iraq
- Coordinates: 33°07′0″N 45°57′0″E
- Country: Iraq
- Governorate: Wasit Governorate
- District: Badra District
- Time zone: UTC+3

Badra (Arabic: بدرة) is a town in eastern Iraq in Wasit Governorate, near the Iranian border. It is populated by Arabs and Turkmen, and more recently by Kurds after their migration from western Iran.

== History ==
Badra was previously inhabited by a majority of Arabs and a minority of Turkmen who lived also near Jassan and Zurbatiyah. The Ottoman treaty of 1639 identifies the three settlements of Jassan, Badra and Zurbatiyah as being part of the Ottoman empire. This arrangement left Zurbatiyah on the Ottoman side and rejected the Banu Lam's tenuous assertions to Bayat and Dehloran which split the Arab tribes living there. Feyli Kurds migrated during the 19th century under Safavid Iran. Hursid Pasha explained the heightened presence of Feyli Kurds was relatively recent as before the rule of Davud Mamluk Pasha, Baghdad's governors had oppressed the regions original Arab inhabitants, forcing them to sell land to the Feyli Kurds. Most of Zurbatiya and Bardah were Sunni Shafi'i, with minority Shia Muslims. Their language is unique, noted as being Turkish mixed with Arabic, Kurdish and Persian. In 1847, the Ottomans acquired Badra as part of a treaty with Persia, which re-instated the Arab and Turkmen population up until the early 21st century.

== Economy ==
In 2014, Iraq started its first crude petroleum delivery from the newly developed Badra oilfield in Wasit Governorate, which is located in the eastern part of the country. The Badra oilfield which had an initial crude petroleum capacity of 15,000 bbl/d, was managed through a profit-sharing agreement among Gazprom OAO of Russia (30%), Oil Exploration Co. of Iraq (25%), Korean Gas Corp. (Kogas) of the Republic of Korea (22.5%), Petronas Carigali International Sdn Bhd of Malaysia (15%), and Türkiye Petrolleri Anonim Ortaklığı (TPAO) of Turkey (7.5%). The Badra oilfield was expected to supply cru petroleum to export terminals in Al Basrah Governorate throu a 165-km inland pipeline network, which was commissioned earlier in the year. The Badra oilfield was expected to reach a capacity of 170.000 bbl/d by 2017, and it was expected to maintain this level for 7 years (Harris, 2014; Watts, 2014).

== Etymology ==
The name Badrah is ultimately derived from the ancient Sumerian city of Der, which is located at nearby Tell 'Aqar. Der is referred to as Bīt-Derāya at the time of Tiglath-pileser III, and as Bīt-Derāyā in later Syriac sources. This eventually became Badarāya, the medieval Arabic name of the city, and finally Badrah in modern times.

== Geography ==
The Mandali-Badra-Tib alluvial fans occur along the foot of mountains along the Iraqi-Iran frontier in S Iraq. These coalescing alluvial fans comprise gravelly and sandy sediments deposited by braided rivers. They overlie the Injana, Mukdadiya and Bai Hassan formations which outcrop in the mountainous area along the state frontier Fig. 19-14). Based on drilling results the maximum thickness of the sand-gravel fan deposits reaches 100 m near Mandali and 65 m near Badra. In other areas data on the fan thicknesses are unavailable. Fan deposits consist of lenticular bodies of poorly sorted fine- to coarse-grained sand and gravel mostly composed of limestone pebbles) with varying amounts of clay. Correlation of layers is difficult because of rapid lateral variations in lithology. However two regionally extensive clay layers were identified near Badra (Hassan et al., 1977). One separates the Quaternary deposits from the Bai Hassan Formation; the other acts as an aquitard separating the upper and lower parts of the fan, giving rise to two aquifers: an unconfined upper aquifer and a confined lower aquifer. Hydrogeologically, the fans are complicated aquifers due to their stratification, variable lithology and uneven recharge. Aquifers occur close to the mountain range where the fan deposits are coarsest. The highest transmissivity of 10002000 m-/day occurs where the aquifer thickness is high. Y indices of >6.5 were found in some wells near Bagsaya. The Transmissivity coefficient is about 400-500 mo/d in the Mandali area and in the Badra-Zurbatiya area it is typically 300–500 m-/d, and averages 336 mo/d (Hassan et al., 1977). Elsewhere the Y index is 5.5-6.5, corresponding to a transmissivity of 50-300 m2/d. Lower transmissivities with Y indices <5.5 probably prevail locally for example between Vassan and Karmashiya and in the E of the region where the transmissivity is <40 m2/d.

== See also ==
- Jassan, Iraq
- Beth Daraye

== Sources ==
- Le Strange, Guy (1905). The Lands of the Eastern Caliphate: Mesopotamia, Persia, and Central Asia, from the Moslem Conquest to the Time of Timur. Cambridge: Cambridge University Press. OCLC 458169031.
- Lipinski, Edward (2000). The Aramaeans: Their Ancient History, Culture, Religion. Leuven: Peeters. ISBN 9042908599. OCLC 44972129.
