= Al-Hay =

Al-Hay الحي
- Town
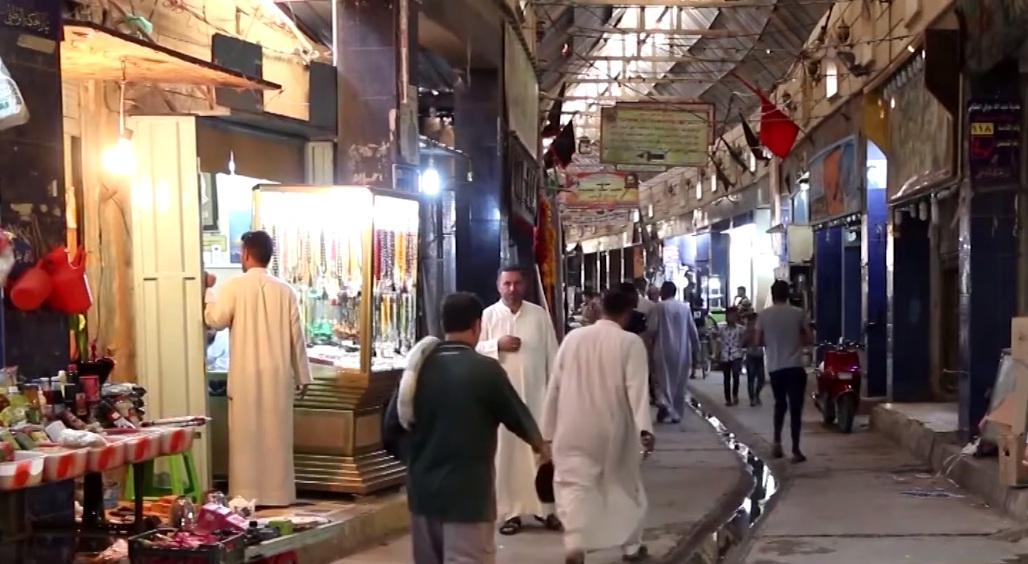
- Al-Hay Bazaar, July 2018

- Location within Iraq
- Country: Iraq
- Governorate: Wasit

Al-Hay (Arabic: الحي) is a town located in Iraq's Wasit Province. It is 45 kilometers south of the city of Kut and 220 kilometers south of Iraqi capital Baghdad. It has a population of 85,500 citizens.

== Climate ==
Climate data for Al-Hai (1991–2020, extremes 1939-1976)
Month	Jan	Feb	Mar	Apr	May	Jun	Jul	Aug	Sep	Oct	Nov	Dec	Year
Record high °C (°F)	27.8 (82.0)	29.6 (85.3)	35.0 (95.0)	40.3 (104.5)	46.1 (115.0)	49.4 (120.9)	50.0 (122.0)	48.9 (120.0)	48.3 (118.9)	43.9 (111.0)	37.2 (99.0)	28.9 (84.0)	50.0 (122.0)
Mean daily maximum °C (°F)	17.3 (63.1)	20.3 (68.5)	25.6 (78.1)	31.9 (89.4)	38.7 (101.7)	43.7 (110.7)	45.6 (114.1)	45.8 (114.4)	42.2 (108.0)	35.6 (96.1)	25.5 (77.9)	19.3 (66.7)	32.6 (90.7)
Daily mean °C (°F)	11.8 (53.2)	14.3 (57.7)	19.2 (66.6)	25.2 (77.4)	31.7 (89.1)	36.2 (97.2)	38.0 (100.4)	37.6 (99.7)	33.6 (92.5)	28.0 (82.4)	18.9 (66.0)	13.4 (56.1)	25.7 (78.3)
Mean daily minimum °C (°F)	7.0 (44.6)	9.0 (48.2)	13.2 (55.8)	18.5 (65.3)	24.6 (76.3)	28.3 (82.9)	29.9 (85.8)	29.6 (85.3)	25.6 (78.1)	20.7 (69.3)	13.2 (55.8)	8.9 (48.0)	19.0 (66.2)
Record low °C (°F)	−8.2 (17.2)	−4.8 (23.4)	0.0 (32.0)	1.9 (35.4)	11.0 (51.8)	16.4 (61.5)	20.5 (68.9)	18.9 (66.0)	15.0 (59.0)	6.7 (44.1)	−0.6 (30.9)	−4.6 (23.7)	−8.2 (17.2)
Average precipitation mm (inches)	27.3 (1.07)	14.6 (0.57)	19.2 (0.76)	15.0 (0.59)	4.2 (0.17)	0.0 (0.0)	0.2 (0.01)	0.0 (0.0)	0.7 (0.03)	6.6 (0.26)	26.0 (1.02)	21.4 (0.84)	135.2 (5.32)
Average precipitation days (≥ 0.1 mm)	7	6	8	8	4	trace	0	0	0	3	6	8	50
Average relative humidity (%)	71	63	57	50	36	26	26	26	29	37	55	70	46
Average afternoon relative humidity (%)	51	49	38	32	22	16	17	16	17	24	40	52	31
Source: NOAA, DWD(precipitaion days and humidity 1941-1970, extremes) (Note: Afternoon humidity measured at 15 local time)
