= Dujaila River =

Irrigation canal in Wasit Governorate, Iraq

Dujaila River Dujaylah, Dujailah, Dujaili, Nahr Shaţţ ad Dujaylah
- The location of the Dujaila River in Iraq
- Etymology: Dujaila depression
- Native name: نهر الدجيلة (Arabic)

Location
- Country: Iraq
- Governorate: Wasit
- District: Kut

Physical characteristics
- Source
  - location: Nazim Sadr Al-Dujaili Bridge/Regulator
  - elevation: 25 m
- Length: 69.45 km (43.15 mi)
- Width
  - average: 15 m (49 ft)
- Depth
  - average: 2.8 m (9.2 ft)
- Discharge
  - average: 42.15 m^{3}/s (1,489 cu ft/s)

Basin features
- River system: Tigris

The Dujaila River (Arabic: نهر الدجيلة), also called the Dujailah, Dujaili, Dujaylah or Nahr Shaţţ ad Dujaylah, is a river and irrigation canal in the Wasit Governorate of Iraq. The canal was created shortly after the Kut Barrage was created in 1943 as part of an agricultural project to convert the desert into fertile farmland. The canal starts at 32.49891°N 45.8124°E and ends at 32.0441°N 46.5592°E. Due the canal being a tributary of the Tigris, droughts on the Tigris have caused problems on the river. In February 2018, a drought struck the river, causing people to drill wells as well as buy water and transport it in tanks to get water. It also caused farmers to block roads and protest the government's negligence in developing water solutions. The canal is designed to irrigate 92,000 hectares of land.
