= Badra District =

Coordinates: 33.1167°N 45.9500°E

Badra District قضاء بدرة
- District
- Interactive map of Badra District
- Country: Iraq
- Governorate: Wasit Governorate
- Seat: Badra
- Time zone: UTC+3 (AST)

Badra District (Arabic: قضاء بدرة) is a district of the Wasit Governorate, Iraq. Its seat is the city of Badra.
