= Al-Suwaira =

Al-Suwaira الصويرة
- Location within Iraq
- Coordinates: 32°56′25″N 044°38′04″E
- Country: Iraq
- Governorate: Wasit
- District: Suwaira

Population (2018)
  - Total: 77,200

Al-Suwaira (Arabic: الصويرة) is a city in Al-Suwaira District, Wasit Governorate, Iraq. It is located on the west bank of the Tigris, 35 km south of Baghdad. It is surrounded by fruit groves and palm orchards. It has a population of 77,200, predominantly Shia Arabs.
