= Kut =

City in Wasit Governorate, Iraq

Kut ٱلْكُوت
- City
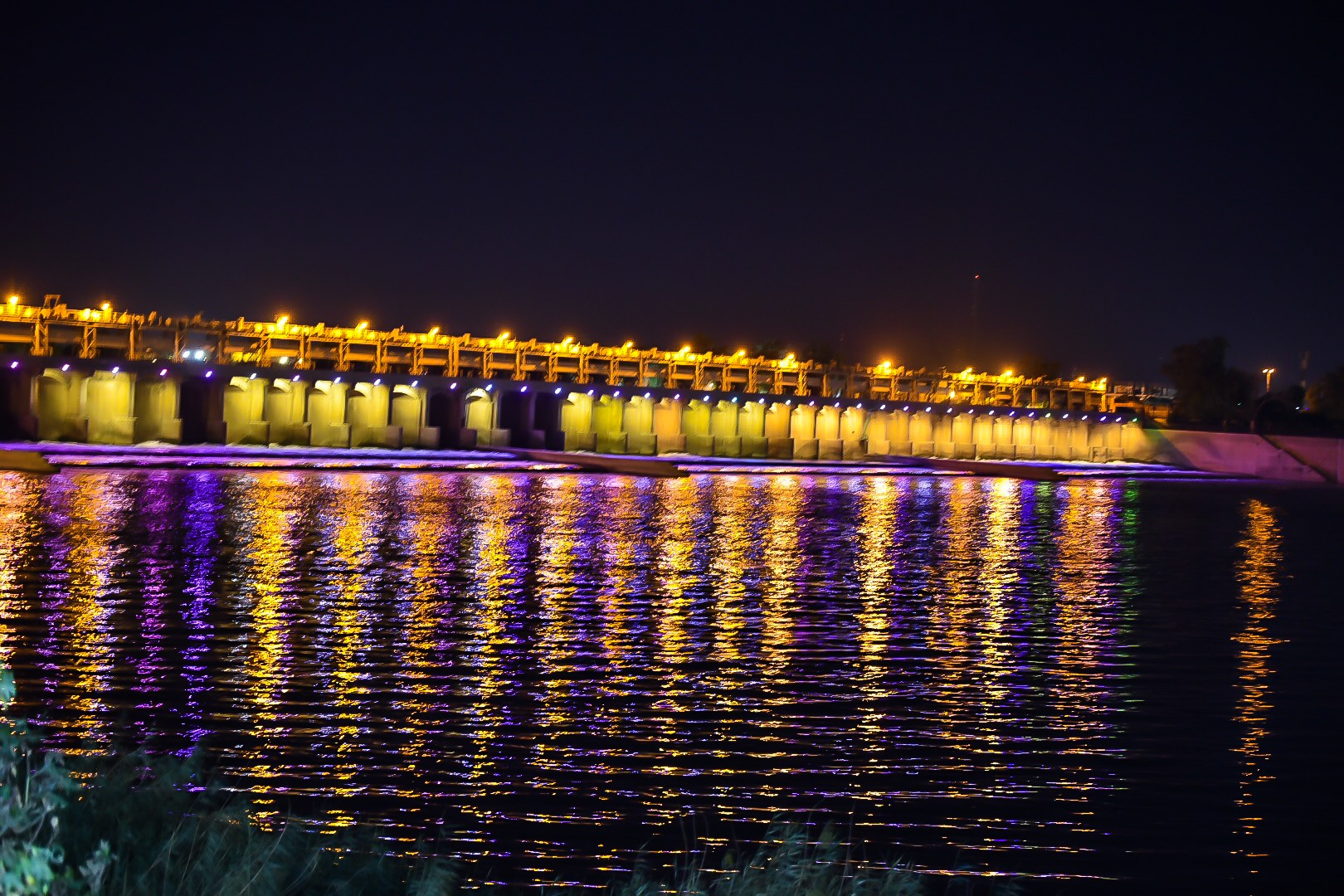
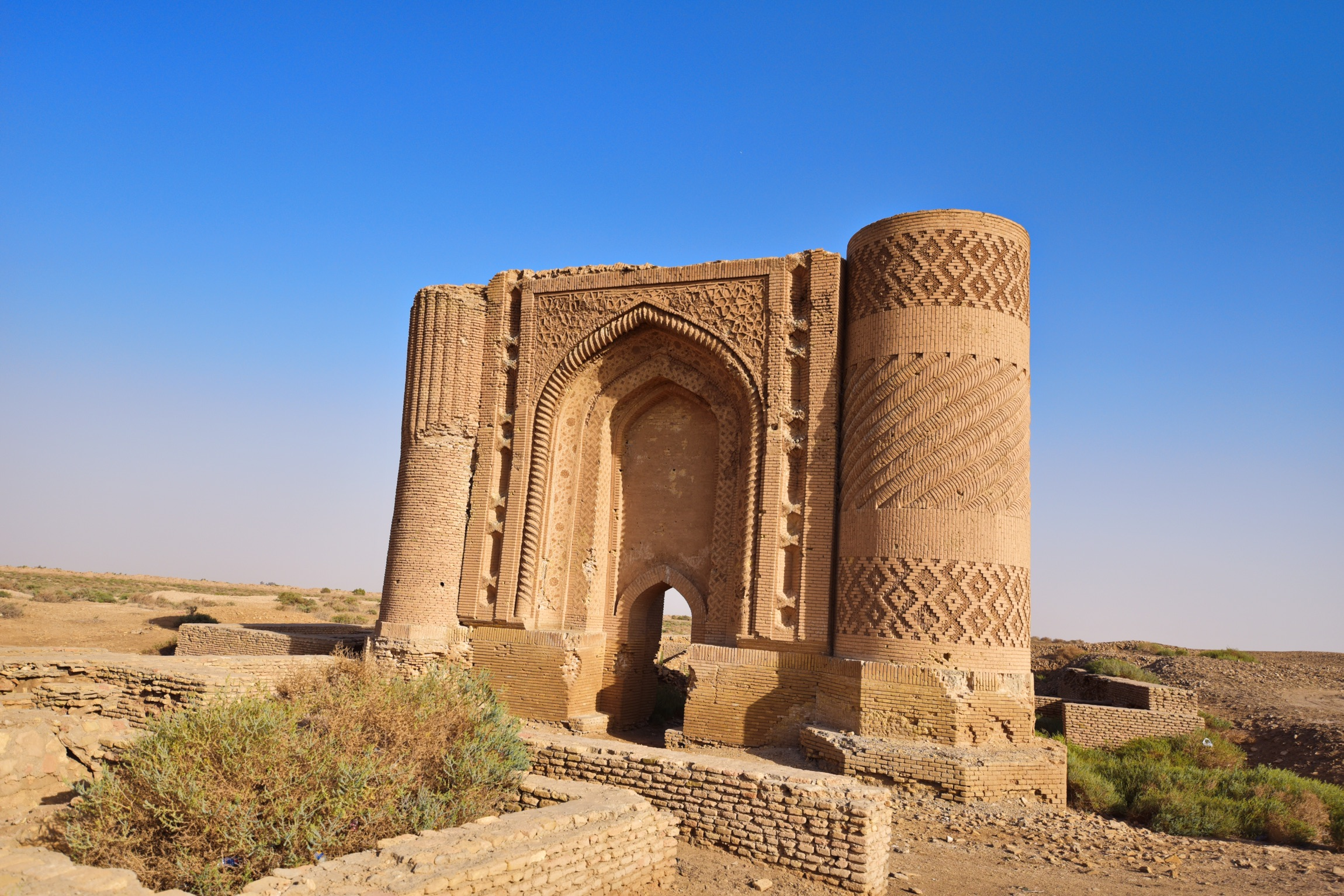
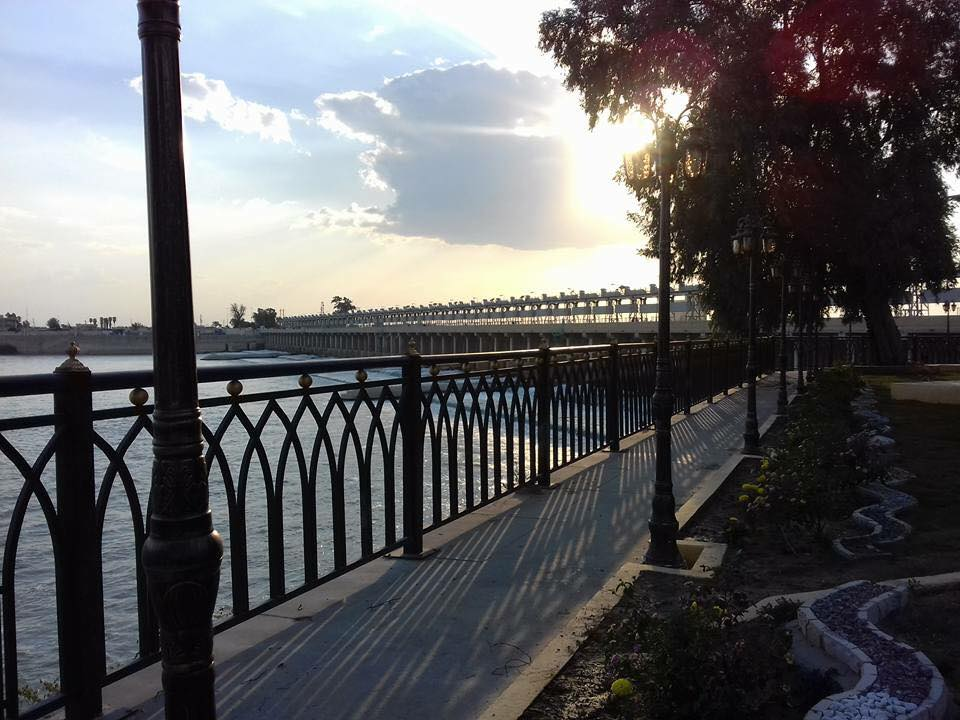
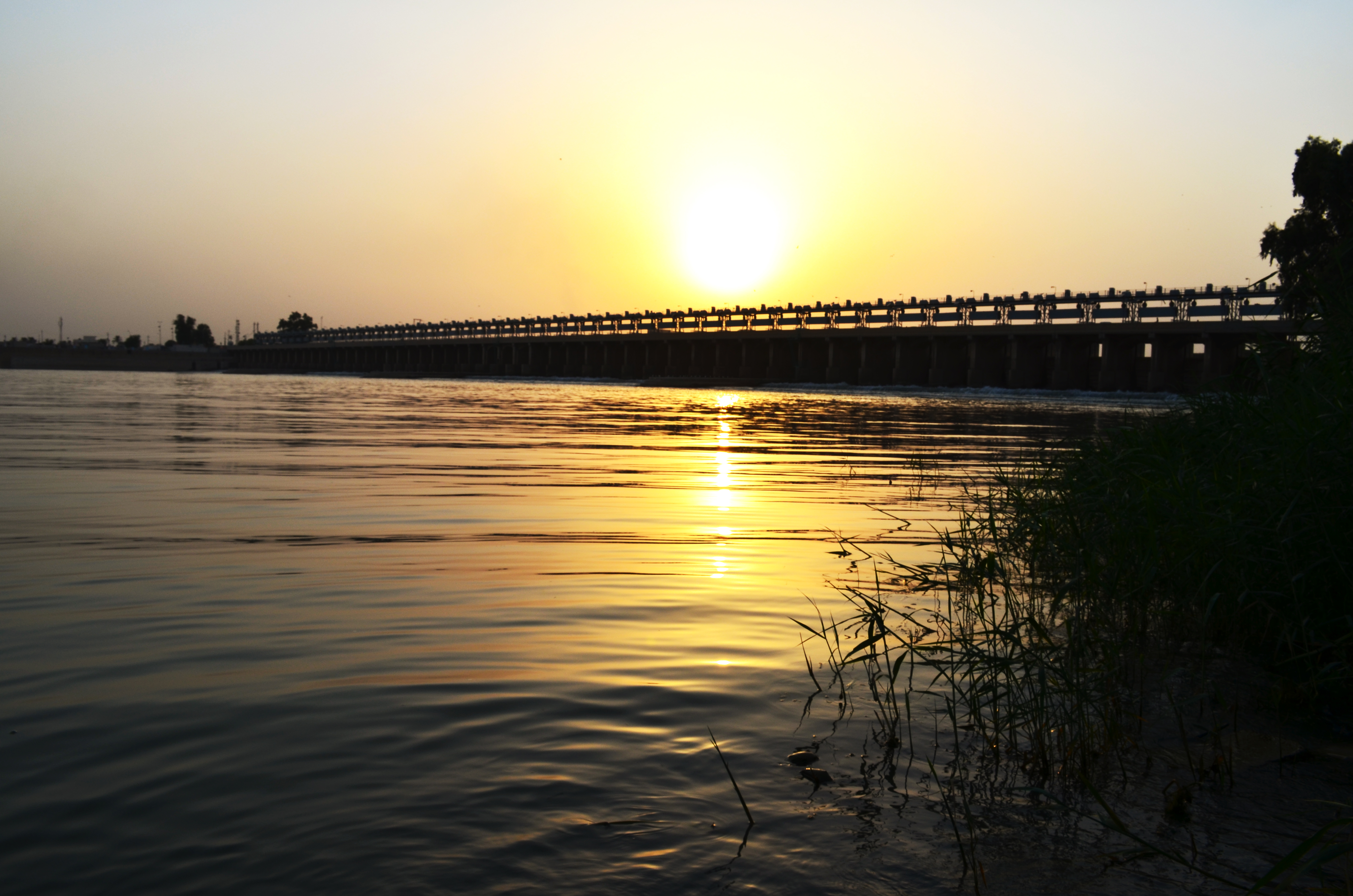

- Location in Iraq
- Coordinates: 32°30′20″N 45°49′29″E
- Country: Iraq
- Governorate: Wasit
- Elevation: 23 m (75 ft)

Population (2019)
  - Total: 315,162
- Time zone: UTC+03:00 (AST)

Kūt (Arabic: ٱلْكُوت, romanized: al-Kūt), officially Al-Kut, also spelled Kutulamare, Kut al-Imara or Kut Al Amara, is a city in eastern Iraq, on the left bank of the Tigris River, about 160 kilometres (99 miles) south east of Baghdad, and the capital of the Wasit Governorate. As of 2018 the estimated population is about 389,400 people. It is the capital of the province long known as Al Kut, but since the 1960s renamed Wasit.

The old town of Kut is within a sharp "U" bend of the river, opposite from the point where the Shatt al-Gharraf branches off from the Tigris. This U-shaped bend almost makes it an island, but for a narrow connection to land. Kut has been a regional center of the carpet trade for centuries. The area around Kut is a fertile cereal grain growing region.

== Geography ==
=== Climate ===
Kut has a hot desert climate (BWh) in the Köppen–Geiger climate classification system. The average annual temperature in Kut is 23.4 °C (74.1 °F). About 138 mm (5.43 in) of precipitation falls annually.

Climate data for Kut
Month	Jan	Feb	Mar	Apr	May	Jun	Jul	Aug	Sep	Oct	Nov	Dec	Year
Mean daily maximum °C (°F)	17.5 (63.5)	20.0 (68.0)	24.0 (75.2)	29.8 (85.6)	36.9 (98.4)	41.5 (106.7)	43.5 (110.3)	43.8 (110.8)	40.8 (105.4)	35.0 (95.0)	26.2 (79.2)	19.2 (66.6)	31.5 (88.7)
Daily mean °C (°F)	11.2 (52.2)	13.2 (55.8)	17.0 (62.6)	23.1 (73.6)	31.3 (88.3)	34.3 (93.7)	35.8 (96.4)	35.4 (95.7)	32.0 (89.6)	26.5 (79.7)	17.9 (64.2)	12.6 (54.7)	24.2 (75.5)
Mean daily minimum °C (°F)	5.5 (41.9)	6.9 (44.4)	10.7 (51.3)	15.6 (60.1)	21.0 (69.8)	24.4 (75.9)	26.4 (79.5)	25.9 (78.6)	22.5 (72.5)	17.4 (63.3)	11.8 (53.2)	7.0 (44.6)	16.3 (61.3)
Average rainfall mm (inches)	32 (1.3)	23 (0.9)	19 (0.7)	27 (1.1)	7 (0.3)	0 (0)	0 (0)	0 (0)	0 (0)	5 (0.2)	18 (0.7)	22 (0.9)	153 (6.0)
Average relative humidity (%)	69	60	56	48	34	24	25	24	24	34	54	72	40
Source: Arab Meteorology Book

== History ==
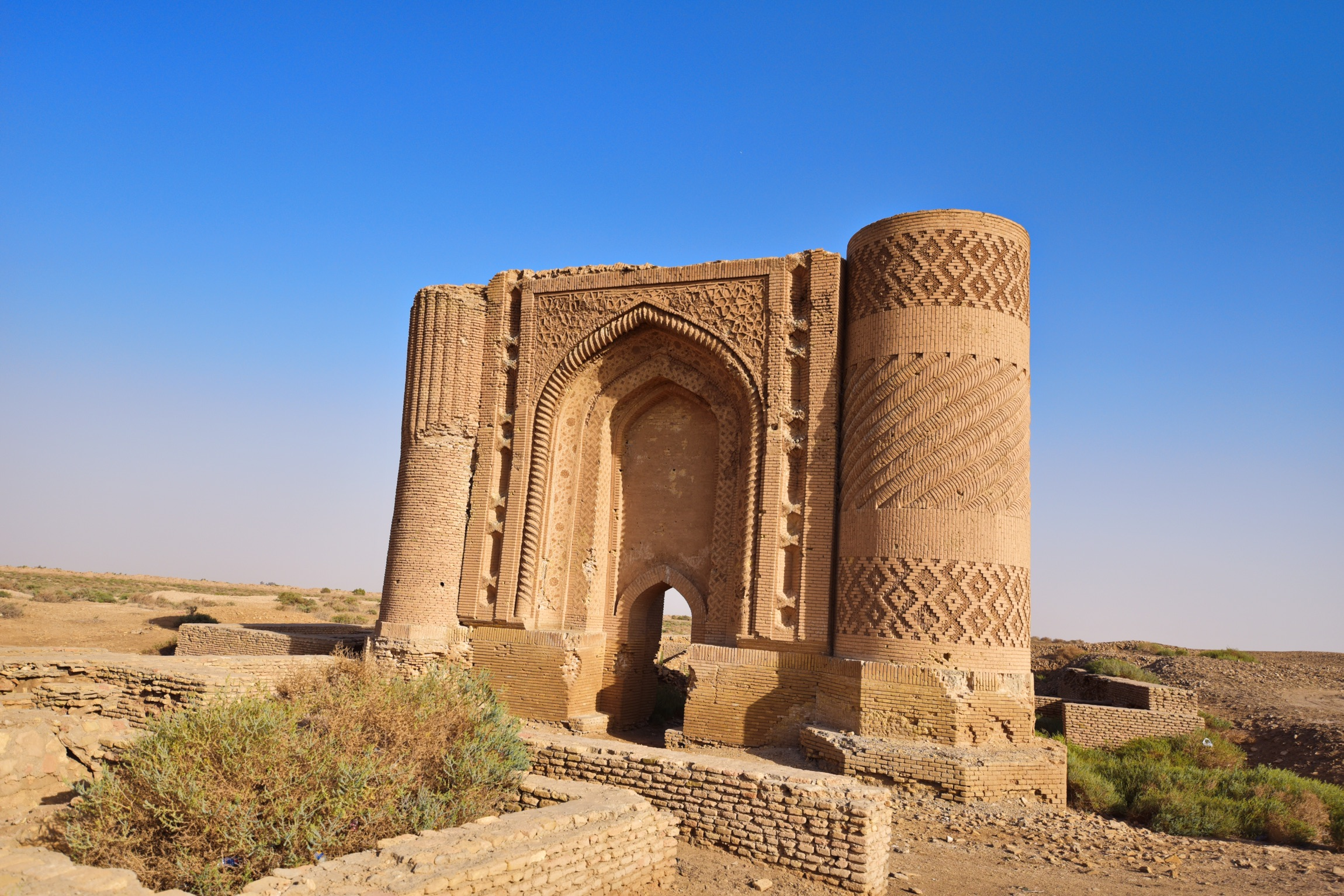
The ancient city of Kut.

The medieval city of Madharaya was at the site of modern Kut. It lay at the point where the Nahrawan Canal flowed out into the Tigris. Madharaya has been identified as the hometown of the Sasanian-era Zoroastrian religious leader Mazdak. By the early 1200s, however, Yaqut al-Hamawi wrote that Madharaya was in ruins.

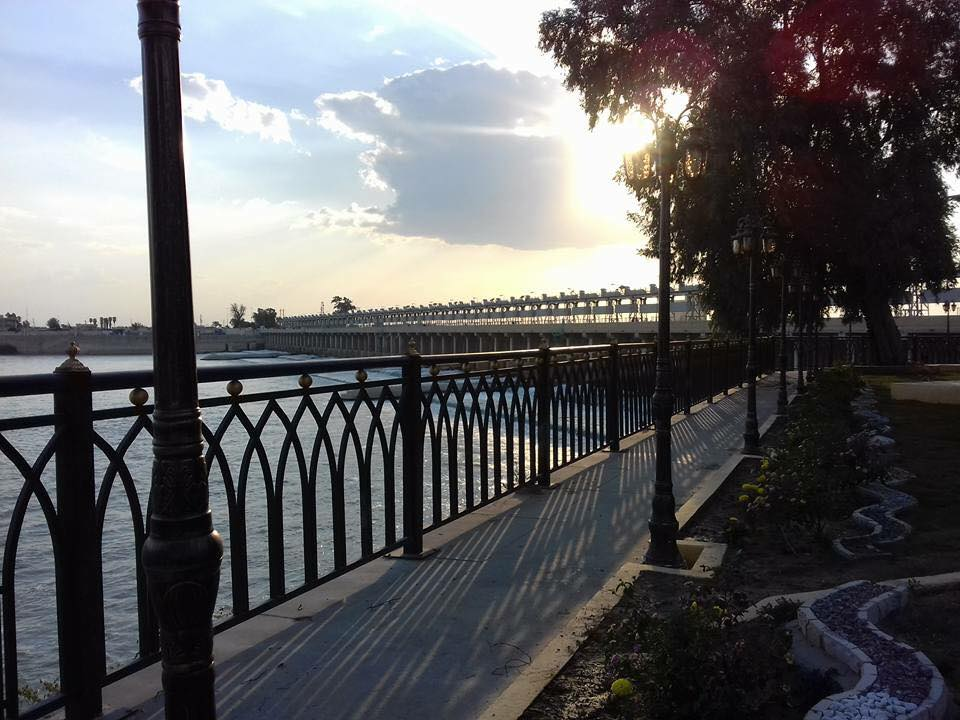
Kut corniche, 2016

Modern Kut owes much of its prosperity to the advent of steamboat transportation on the Tigris in the 19th century period of Ottoman Iraq.

=== World War I ===
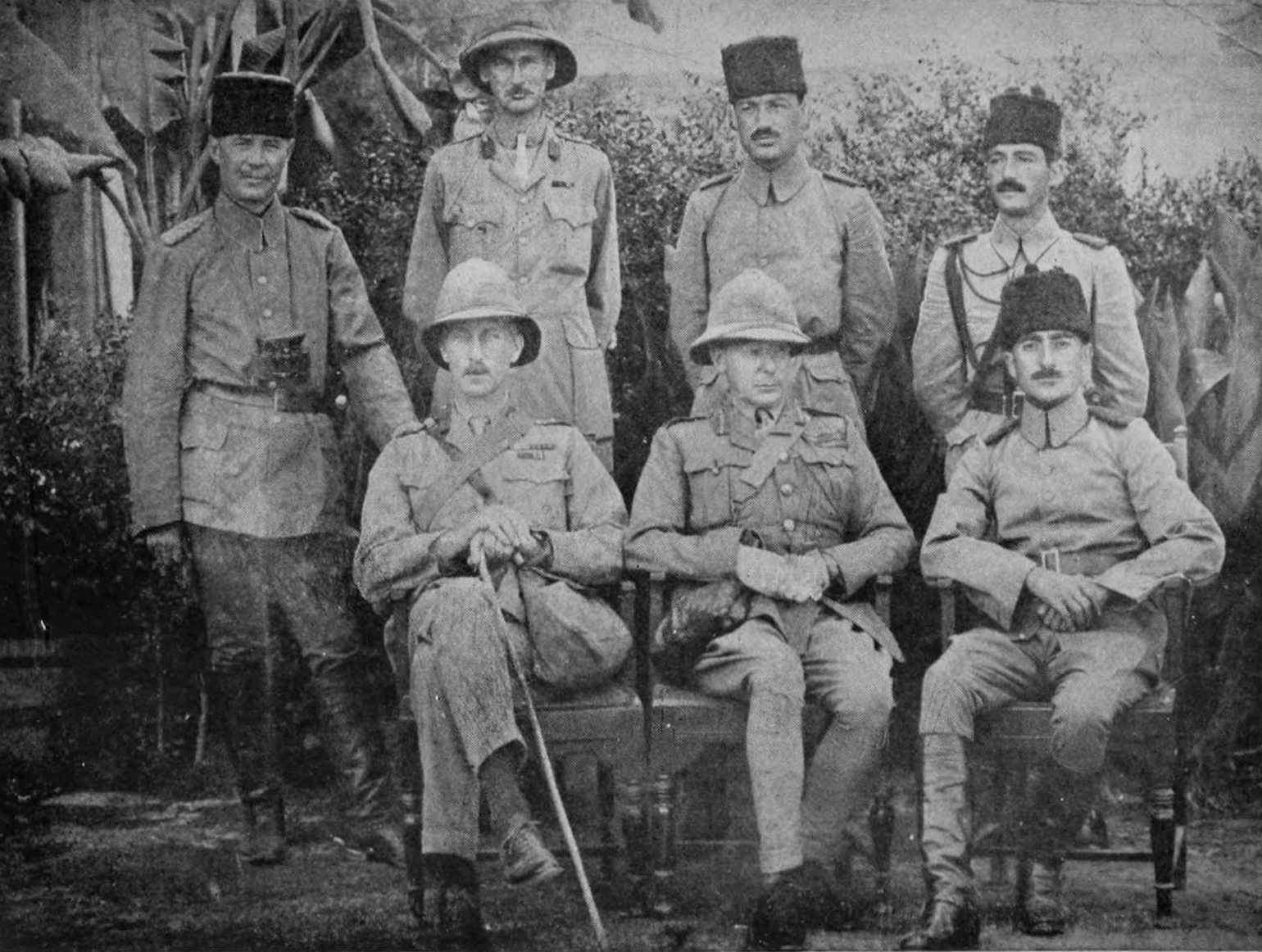
Townshend, Khalil Pasha and other unidentified officers after the surrender of the Kut garrison in 1916

Kut was the scene of a fierce battle during World War I. The British Mesopotamian Expeditionary Force, led by Major General Charles Townshend, marched north from Basra in September 1915 in what became known as the Mesopotamian Campaign for control over Ottoman Iraq. They reached Kut on September 26, where after three days of fighting they drove the Ottoman forces from the town.

After a halt of nearly nine months, Townshend then headed up river to Ctesiphon. Following a battle there, the British forces withdrew back to Kut. On December 7, 1915, the Turks, under their commander, Colonel Nureddin Pasha, arrived at Kut and began a siege that lasted 147 days. The British cavalry under Colonel Gerard Leachman succeeded in breaking out, but Townshend and the bulk of the force remained besieged. Many attempts were made to relieve Townshend's forces, but all were defeated. Some 23,000 British and Indian soldiers died in the attempts to retake Kut, probably the worst loss of life for the British away from the European theatre. Near the end of the siege, T. E. Lawrence and Aubrey Herbert of British Intelligence unsuccessfully tried to bribe Khalil Pasha to allow the troops to escape. Townshend, with some 8,000 surviving soldiers, finally surrendered Kut on April 29, 1916. The captured soldiers were divided, where the officers were sent to separate facilities, and many of the enlisted soldiers were impressed into hard labour until the surrender of the Ottoman Empire; more than half of them died. The British went back on the offensive in December 1916 with a larger and better-supplied force under General Sir Frederick Stanley Maude and with steep casualties retook Kut on February 23, 1917.

Kut suffered heavy damage during the First World War, and was almost entirely rebuilt afterward.

=== Modern history ===
The Kut Barrage was constructed in the city in the 1930s to provide irrigation water for the surrounding area. The barrage supports a road and includes a lock for boats passing up and down the Tigris. Its purpose is to maintain a sufficiently high water level in the Tigris to provide water for the Gharraf irrigation canal.

In 1952, 26,440 hectares (65,300 acres) were irrigated from water provided by the Gharraf Canal. Of this newly reclaimed land, 14,080 hectares (34,800 acres) was distributed to small farmers as part of a social land reform program. These farmers received 10 hectares (25 acres) per family and were required to live on the land they farmed. In 2005, repairs and maintenance works were carried out at the Kut Barrage and the Gharraf Head Regulator for a total cost of US$3 million.

== Contingency Operating Base Delta (COB Delta) ==
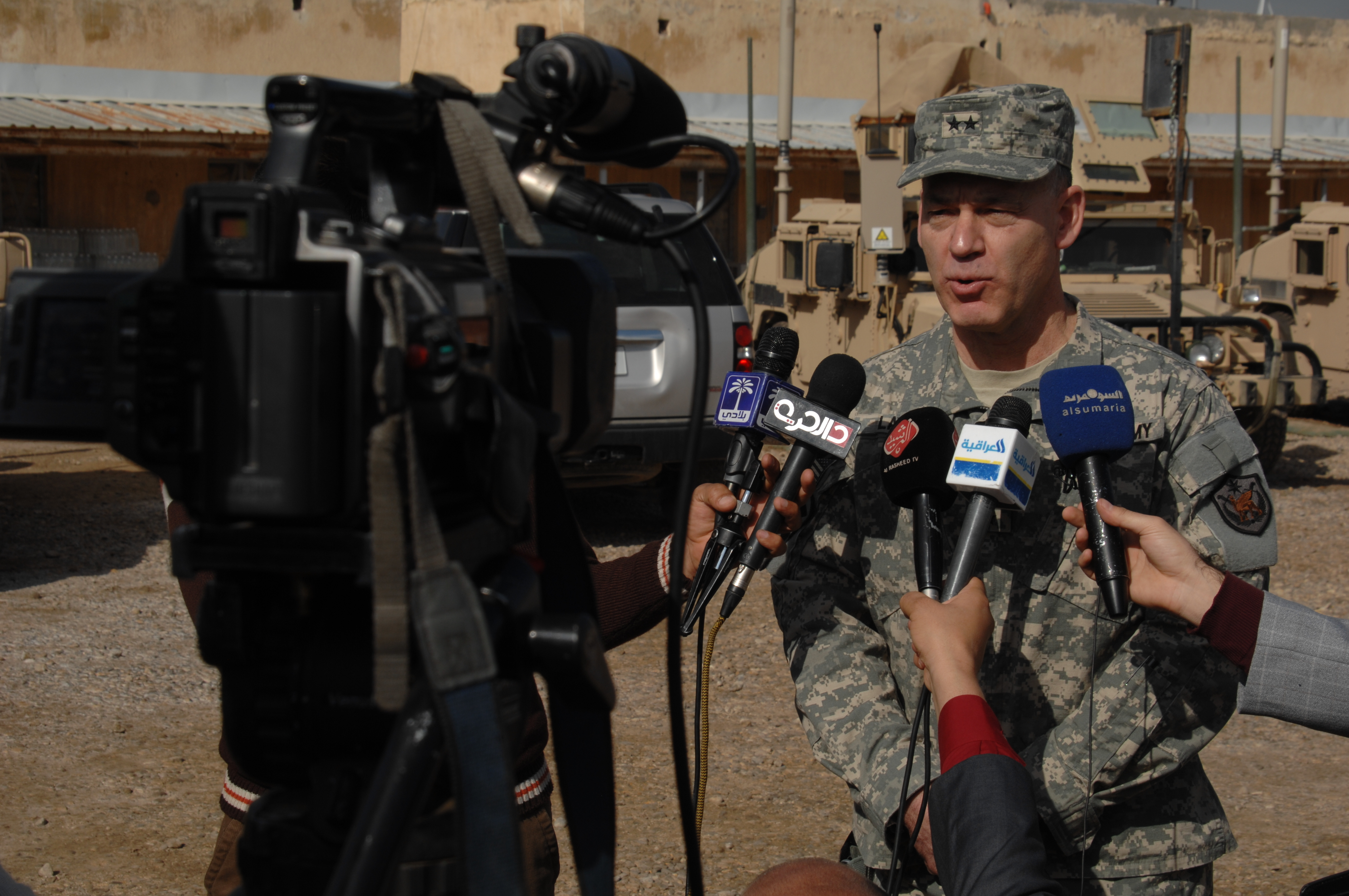
US Army Maj. Gen. Lanza speaks with Iraqi journalists during a tour of FOB Delta, Jan.11, 2010

In the early 21st century, the Contingency Operating Base (COB) Delta was an American military installation located on the right bank of the Tigris southwest from Kut. Designated as a Forward operating base (FOB) in the early stages of Operation Iraqi Freedom, Delta was centered on a former Iraqi Air Force base, Ubaydah Bin Al Jarrah Air Base. In 2005 Delta was selected to become an "enduring" FOB, remaining open after other FOBs had closed. During the Operation Iraqi Freedom, FOB Delta was manned by Polish, Kazakhstan, El Salvadorian, Georgian, Lithuanian, British, and US Multi-National Forces. Sometime after 2009 the FOB was re-designated as a COB. COB Delta was closed on October 24, 2011 and officially turned over to the IAF in a handover ceremony that afternoon in the main flight line hangar/terminal. Later that evening, approximately 2,200, the last Force Pro civilians flew out by helicopter.

== See also ==
- Anglo-Iraqi War
- List of places in Iraq
- List of United States Military installations in Iraq
- 2025 Kut shopping mall fire

== Sources ==
- Le Strange, Guy (1905). The Lands of the Eastern Caliphate: Mesopotamia, Persia, and Central Asia, from the Moslem Conquest to the Time of Timur. Cambridge: Cambridge University Press. OCLC 458169031.
- Madelung, Wilferd (1988). Religious Trends in Early Islamic Iran. Albany: Bibliotheca Persica. ISBN 0-88706-701-8.
- El-Samarraie, Husam Quam (1970). Agriculture in Iraq During the 3rd Century, A.H. London: University of London.
