= Uskaf =

Ancient and medieval city of Iraq

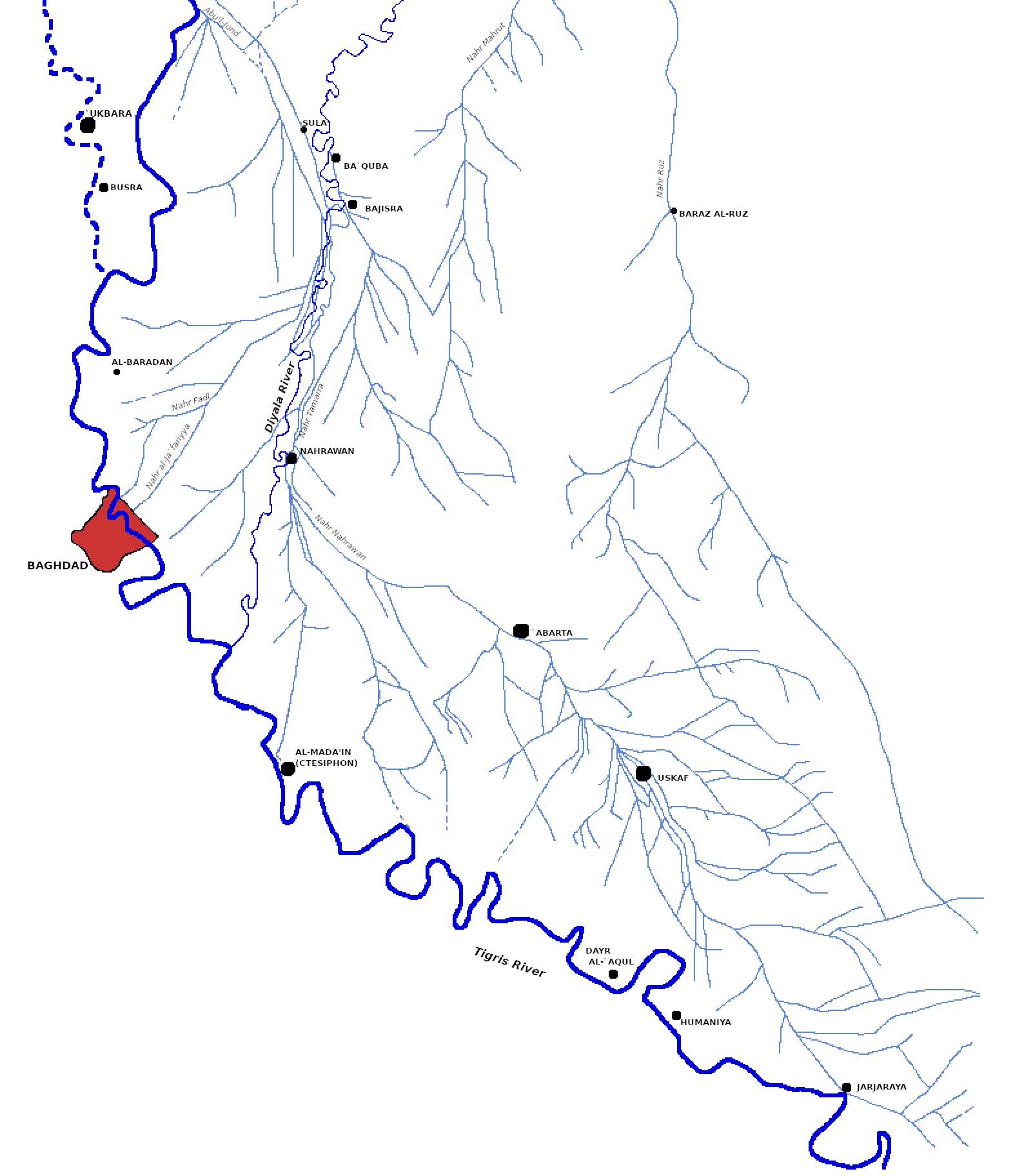
Map showing Uskaf in relation to other contemporary sites in the region

Uskāf Banī Junayd, also Iskāf, was an ancient and medieval city of Iraq, located on the Nahrawan Canal at the present site of Sumāka. In its heyday, during the Sasanian period and early Islamic caliphates, Uskaf was the largest city in the Diyala basin; however, it declined sharply after the Samarran period and was abandoned by the early 1100s.

== History ==
Uskaf was inhabited during the Achaemenid and Parthian periods, but on a much smaller scale than in later periods. Although not mentioned by name in contemporary accounts, Uskaf was a significant urban center during the Sasanian period. It grew to an area not much smaller than Ctesiphon itself. A massive weir at the site of al-Qantara was constructed just north of Uskaf during the Sasanian period; however, it does not seem to have been in use for that long during this period.

Uskaf was the largest city in the Diyala basin both in the Sasanian and early Islamic periods. During this time, the city became known as "Bani Junayd" after a powerful local family known for its hospitality. Writing in the early 1200s, well after the city's decline, Yaqut al-Hamawi noted that many learned men had come from Uskaf, reflecting the city's prosperity in its heyday.

After the Samarran period, however, Uskaf went into a dramatic decline, with the physical area of the city shrinking to a mere 5% of its greatest size in the Sasanian and early Islamic periods. During this period, the volume of water flowing through the Nahrawan canal decreased substantially, leading to an increased reliance on the weir at al-Qantara as a source of water for irrigation. The weir artificially raised the canal's water level above its location, but dramatically reduced the water level below it.

The final construction at Uskaf dates from the late 11th century, and the site appears to have been abandoned shortly thereafter. By the early 1200s, Yaqut al-Hamawi wrote that the lands around Uskaf had gone completely out of cultivation.

== Sources ==
- Adams, Robert M. (1965). Land Behind Baghdad: A History of Settlement on the Diyala Plains. Chicago and London: University of Chicago Press. OCLC 899942882.
- Le Strange, Guy (1905). The Lands of the Eastern Caliphate: Mesopotamia, Persia, and Central Asia, from the Moslem Conquest to the Time of Timur. Cambridge: Cambridge University Press. OCLC 458169031.
