= Beth Daraye =

Region of Western Asia in late antiquity

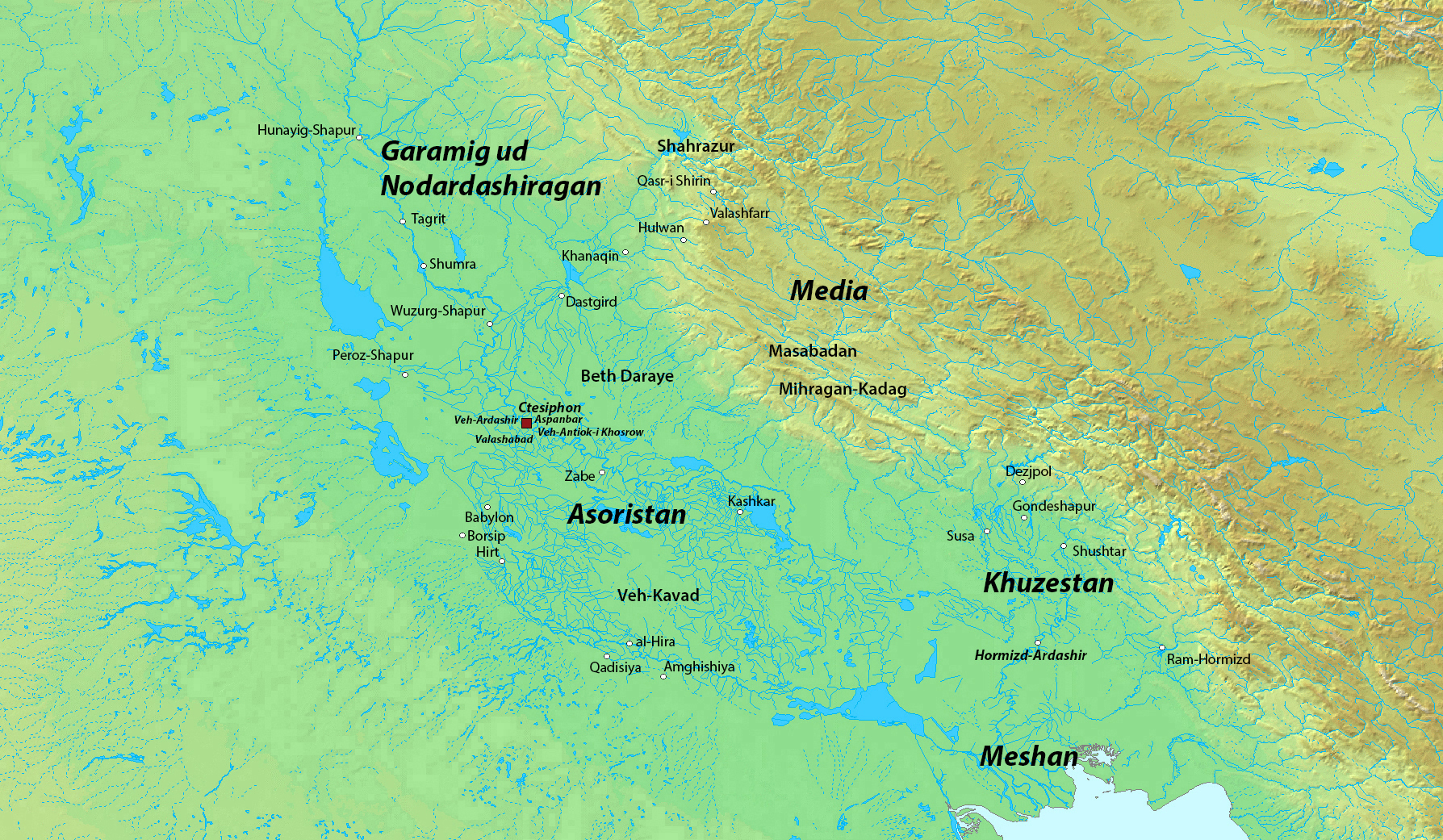
Map of the southwestern part of the Sasanian Empire.

Beth Daraye (meaning "land of Dara"), known in Arabic sources as Badaraya, was a region and administrative site southeast of the lower Nahrawan Canal, in the Sasanian province of Asoristan in present-day Iraq. 150km east-southeast of Baghdad. It lay between al-Bandanijayn and the environs of Waset and produced excellent dried dates.
