= Wasit Governorate =

Governorate of Iraq

Wasit Governorate محافظة واسط
- Governorate
- Flag Seal

- Coordinates: 32°30′09″N 45°49′28″E
- Country: Iraq
- Capital: Kut
- Governor: Hadi al-Hamashi

Area
  - Total: 17,153 km^{2} (6,623 sq mi)

Population (2024 census)
  - Total: 1,644,273
  - Density: 95.859/km^{2} (248.27/sq mi)
- ISO 3166 code: IQ-WA
- HDI (2024): 0.718 high · 9th of 18

Wasit Governorate (Arabic: واسط, romanized: Wāsit) is a governorate in eastern Iraq, south-east of Baghdad and bordering Iran. Prior to 1976 it was known as Kut Province. Major cities include the capital Al-Kut, Al-Hai and Al-Suwaira. The governorate contains the Mesopotamian Marshes of Shuwayja, Al-Attariyah, and Hor Aldelmj. Its name comes from the Arabic word meaning "middle", as the former city of Wasit lay along the Tigris about midway between Baghdad and Basra. Wasit city was abandoned after the Tigris shifted course.

== History ==
The ancient Sumerian city-state of Der is located near the town of Badra.

The governorate experienced heavy fighting in the Iran–Iraq War, specifically the Battle of the Marshes.

During the Iraq spring fighting of 2004, the Mahdi Army briefly took control of the capital Kut, from April 6 to April 16, before being defeated by US forces.

== Demographics ==
The population is approximately 1,450,000. The majority are Shia Arabs. The marshes have traditionally been home to many Marsh Arabs. There are also Feyli Kurds in the eastern town of Badra. A small Feyli Kurdish community exists east of Kut.

As of 2007, the unemployment rate was 10% and the poverty rate 35%.

Historical population
Year	Pop.	±% p.a.
1977	415,100	—
1987	564,670	+3.13%
1997	783,614	+3.33%
2009	1,150,079	+3.25%
2024	1,644,273	+2.41%
Source: Citypopulation

== Provincial government ==
- Governor: Hadi al-Hamashi
- Deputy Governor: Ahmed Abdu Salam
- Provincial Council Chairman: Ali Hussein Suleimon

=== Districts ===
- Al-Aziziyah
- Badra
- Al-Hai
- Kut
- Numaniyah
- Suwaira
