= 2005 in Iraq =

- Decades: 1980s; 1990s; 2000s; 2010s; 2020s
- See also: Other events of 2005; List of years in Iraq

Events in the year 2005 in Iraq.

== Incumbents ==
- President: Ghazi Mashal Ajil al-Yawer (acting) (until 6 April), Jalal Talabani (starting 7 April)
- Prime Minister: Ayad Allawi (until 3 May), Ibrahim al-Jaafari (starting 3 May)
- Vice President: Ibrahim al-Jaafari (until 7 April), Rowsch Shaways (until 7 April), Adil Abdul-Mahdi (starting 7 April), Ghazi Mashal Ajil al-Yawer (starting 7 April)
- Iraqi Kurdistan Regional Government (autonomous region)
  - President: Massoud Barzani (until 7 April)

== Events ==
=== January ===
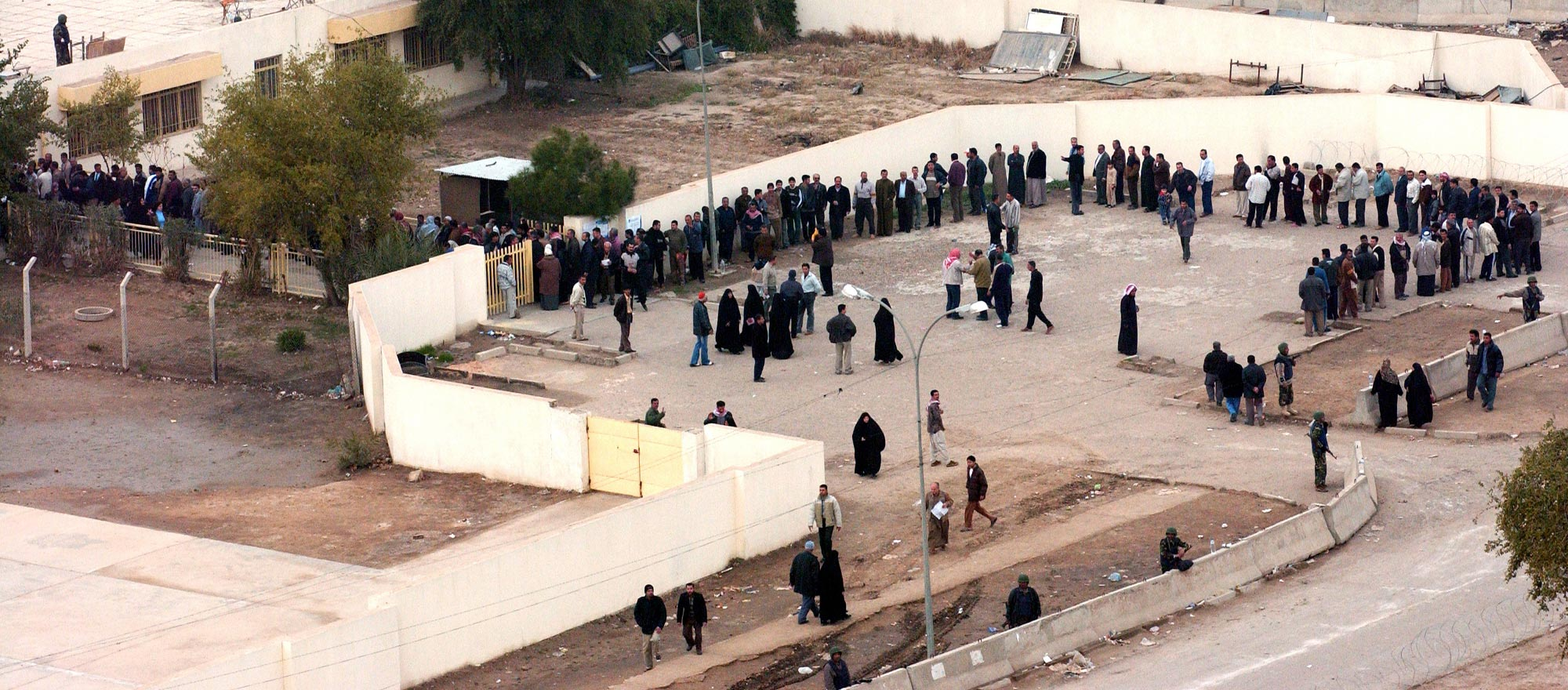
Hundreds of voters line up outside a polling place in Baghdad, 30 January 2005

- January 4 – Governor Ali Al-Haidri, governor of Baghdad province, is assassinated along with two of his bodyguards.
- January 6 – Seven national guards killed when IED strikes Bradley fighting vehicle.
- January 21 – A suicide car bomb blows up outside a Shi'ite mosque in Baghdad killing 14 worshipers and wounding 40.
- January 26 – Thirty-one U.S. Marines are killed in a helicopter crash near the Jordan border.
- January 27 – Iraq's expatriates start voting for the Iraqi National Assembly election, 2005
- January 28 – The insurgency continues with several dozen Iraqi deaths. Seven U.S. soldiers killed, three in a helicopter crash.
- January 29 – About 17 people died from car bombs on the eve of the elections. A rocket hit the U.S. Embassy compound inside Baghdad's fortified Green Zone, killing two people and wounding at least four. According to the embassy spokesman, all of them are Americans.
- January 30 – Ghazi Yawer was one of the first people to vote in the Iraqi National Assembly election. Up to 15 British military personnel were killed in Iraq when an air force transport plane crashed northwest of Baghdad. Meanwhile, at least 35 people die in attacks at polling places.
- January 31 – Nine RAF personnel and one soldier are KIA after a British Hercules plane comes down 25 miles (40 km) north-west of Baghdad.

=== February ===
- February 4 – Paul Wolfowitz announces that 15,000 U.S. troops whose tours of duty had been temporarily extended will be withdrawn by the next month.
- February 7 – Two suicide bombers strike in Mosul and Baquba, claiming at least 27 lives, mostly police recruits.
- February 8 – At least 21 people are killed in a blast at an Iraqi army recruitment centre in Muthenna airfield in west Baghdad.
- February 9 – At least nine Iraqis die including a correspondent for a U.S.-funded Arabic TV station.
- February 10 – At least 50 Iraqis are killed when rebels attack targets across the country. Meanwhile, the election results are postponed because of a limited recount.
- February 11 – More than 20 Iraqis are killed in attacks near a Shia mosque and on a Baghdad bakery.
- February 12 – A car bomb attack blast outside a hospital kills at least 17 people in the town of Musayyib.
- February 13 – Limited election results are announced.
- February 17 – Full results are announced in the national legislative election. The United Iraqi Alliance wins a slight majority.
- February 19 – At least 40 people are killed and more than 100 wounded in attacks by suicide bombers in Baghdad and other parts of Iraq during festival of Ashoura.
- February 22 – Two policemen and two civilians are killed and another 30 police are injured in a suicide attack against a convoy of security forces in Baghdad.
- February 24 – A car bombing attack in the Iraqi city of Tikrit reportedly kills up to 15 people. Another 25 are injured in an attack on a police station.
- February 25 – Three US troops are killed and eight others injured in a bomb explosion in Tarmiyah just north of Baghdad.
- February 27 – Five people are killed in a bomb blast in Hammam Alil. In another incident, a US soldier is shot and killed in Baghdad while manning a traffic checkpoint.
- February 28 – 127 Iraqis are killed by a suicide car bomb outside a medical center in Hilla, south of Baghdad. The bomber, who later turned out to be a U.S. educated Jordanian lawyer from al Qaeda targeted a large crowd of mainly teachers and police recruits outside a health clinic. It was the deadliest single blast in Iraq's history.

=== March ===
- March 2 – Judge Barwez Mohammed Mahmoud al-Merwani and his son Aryan Barwez al-Merwani are murdered in the Azamyiah district. Also 10 people are killed in attacks on an Iraqi army base and a checkpoint in Baghdad.
- March 3 – Two car bombs exploded near Iraq's Interior Ministry killing at least five policemen. In total 17 people are killed in various incidents.
- March 4 – Four U.S. soldiers are killed in Al Anbar Governorate. An Italian hostage, journalist Giuliana Sgrena is hurt by friendly fire shortly after her rescue, and an Italian secret service agent escorting her, Nicola Calipari, is killed.
- March 7 – 33 people are killed and dozens wounded as Iraqi insurgents attack in Baqouba and Baghdad.
- March 9 – A suicide car bomb attack reportedly carried out by a group linked to al-Qaeda kills three and injures more than 20 people in Baghdad.
- March 10 – At least 47 people are killed by a suicide bomber who blows himself up at a Shia funeral service in the northern city of Mosul.
- March 20 – A gun battle between Iraqi insurgents and US troops near Baghdad leaves 24 rebels dead. Earlier, a suicide bomber kills the head of the police anti-corruption department in the northern city of Mosul. Insurgents then attack his funeral, killing at least two other people.

=== April ===
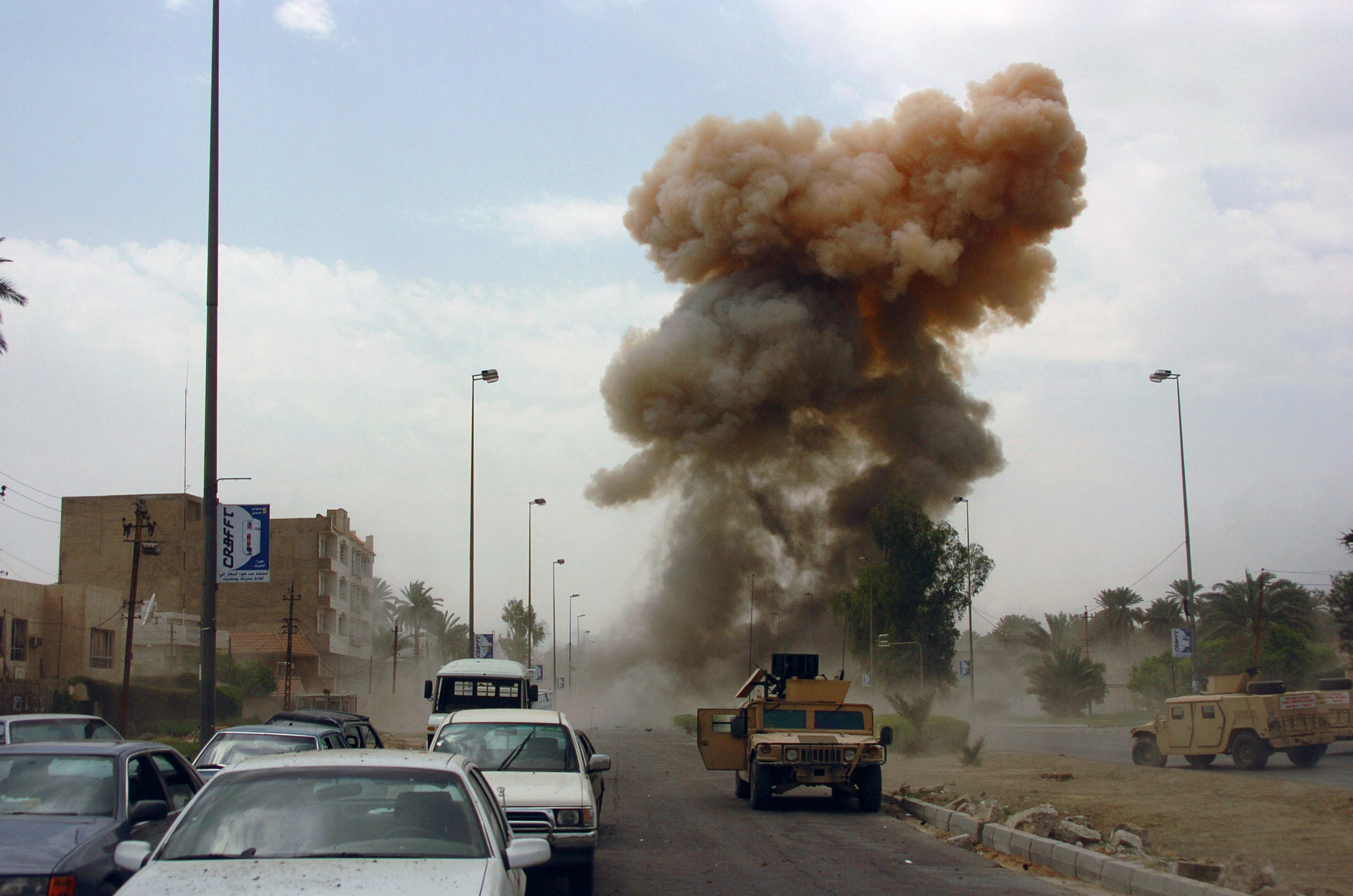
As Coalition Forces arrive at a car bombing in South Baghdad, a second car bomb is detonated, targeting those responding to the initial incident. 14 April 2005

- April 2 – The Battle of Abu Ghraib was an attack on US forces at Abu Ghraib prison, which consisted of heavy mortar and rocket fire, under which armed insurgents attacked with grenades, small arms, and two vehicle-borne improvised explosive devices (VBIED).
- April 6 – Jalal Talabani is elected President of Iraq by the Iraqi National Assembly, becoming the first President elected under the country's new Constitution.
- April 9 – Tens of thousands of demonstrators loyal to Shiite cleric Muqtada Sadr march through Baghdad denouncing the US occupation of Iraq, two years after the fall of Saddam Hussein. Insurgents also kill 15 Iraqi soldiers traveling in a convoy south of Baghdad.
- April 14 – Two car bombs kill 18 in Baghdad neighborhood.
- April 15 – At least four people are killed in bombings in the Iraqi city of Samarra and in the capital Baghdad.
- April 16 – Three American soldiers are killed when a Marine base comes under indirect fire near Ramadi, west of Baghdad.
- April 17 – A roadside bomb near the central city of Samarra kills two Iraqi soldiers. Also other bombs kill an American soldier and two civilians.
- April 18 –
  - Iraqi security forces numbering in the hundreds launch an operation to "root out" Sunni insurgents at the tip of Iraq's "Triangle of Death".
  - In Baghdad, gunmen ambush a senior Defence Ministry adviser, Major General Adnan al-Qaraghulli, killing him and his son.
- April 19 – Two American soldiers are killed and four wounded in a car bombing. Another suicide car bomb outside an Iraqi army recruitment center and other attacks in the country kills a dozen people and wounds more than 50.
- April 20 –
  - Iraq's prime minister Iyad Allawi escapes an assassination attempt when a suicide bomber in a car attacks his convoy near his home. The attack kills two policeman and wounds four.
  - 60 bodies are fished out of the Tigris river south of Baghdad; the bodies appear to not be from a single region or date . Also insurgents execute 19 Iraqi soldiers in a football stadium in Haditha.
- April 21 –
  - A commercial helicopter is shot down about 20 km (12 mi) north of the Iraqi capital Baghdad, killing all 11 people on board. One survivor is shot by insurgents who rush to the site.
  - Two foreign contractors are killed in a roadside bomb on the road to Baghdad airport.
- April 22 – A car bomb explodes outside a Shiite mosque in Baghdad, killing at least nine people and wounding more than 20.
- April 23 – At least 19 people including nine Iraqi and four US soldiers were killed when US and Iraqi convoys were attacked by insurgents near Baghdad.
- April 24 – At least 22 people are killed and 57 more were wounded in twin bombings in a market near the Ahl al-Beit mosque in Shula, north of Baghdad.
- April 29 – At least 29 people are killed and more than 100 injured in a wave of car bomb attacks targeting Iraqi security forces in and around Baghdad.
- April 30 – Insurgents launch attacks in Baghdad and northern Iraq killing at least 11 Iraqis and wounding more than 40.

=== May ===
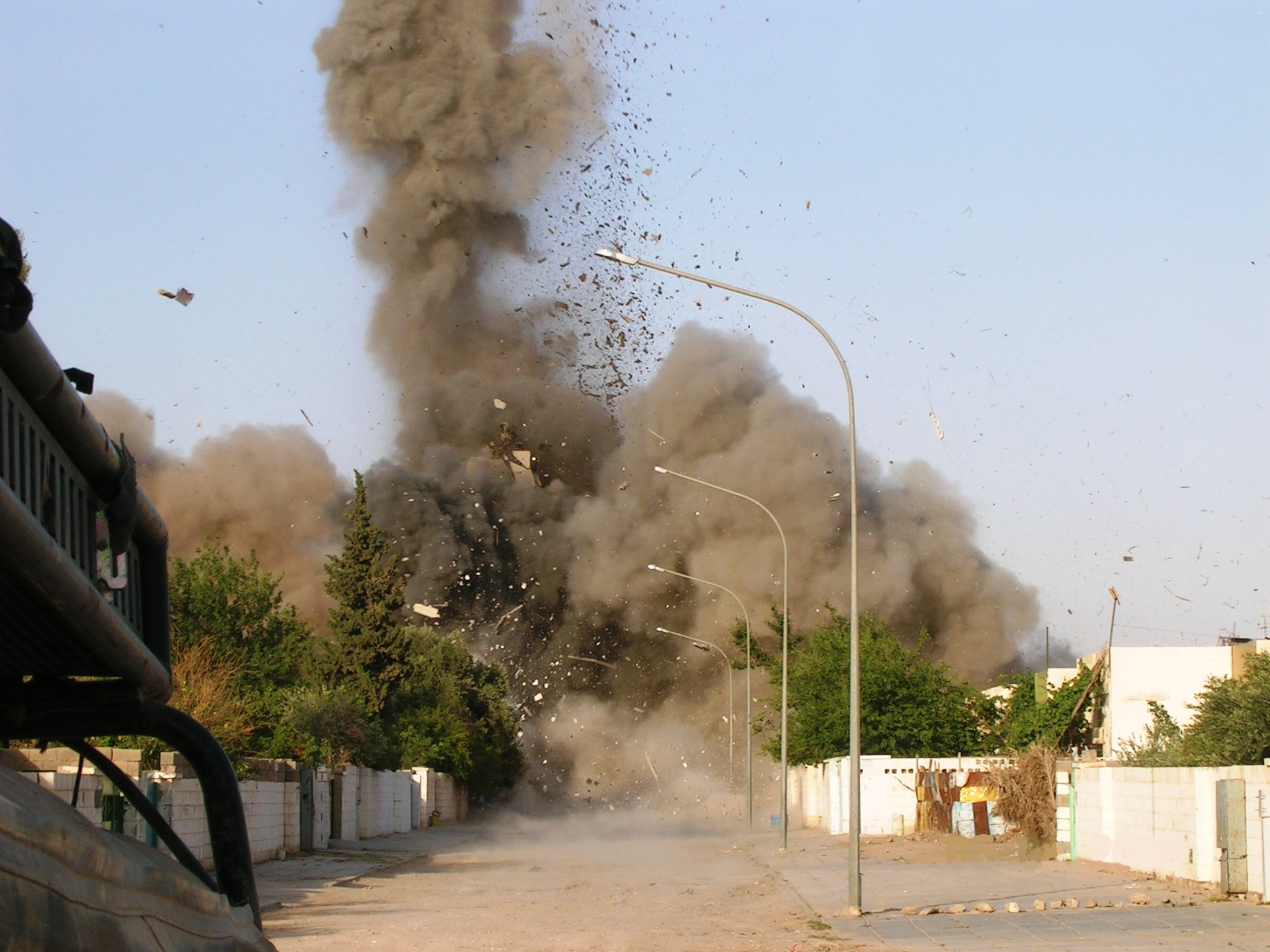
A large weapons cache New Ubaydi is destroyed, May 2005

- May 1 – A suicide attack targets a Kurdish funeral in the northern town of Talafar, near Mosul leaves at least 25 people dead and injures more than 30 others. Earlier, at least five policemen and four civilians are killed in two separate attacks in Baghdad.
- May 2 – Nine people die in a blast in a busy shopping area of Baghdad. At least three people are killed in an explosion in the east of the capital and four more died in two blasts in the northern city of Mosul.
- May 3 – Clashes in the Iraqi city of Ramadi left 12 insurgents, two Iraqi civilians and one Iraqi soldier dead.
- May 4 – At least 60 people killed and dozens wounded in a suicide bombing at the offices of a Kurdish party in Irbil, northern Iraq.
- May 5 – At least 24 people die in wave of attacks in Baghdad.
- May 6 – A suicide car bomber strikes a vegetable market in Suwayra, killing at least 58 people and wounding 44. 9 more Iraqi die in another attack.
- May 7 – Two suicide car bombs explode in a central Baghdad square killing 22 people.
- May 11 – At least 71 people are killed and more than 160 wounded as suicide bombers rip through a crowded market and a line of security force recruits in a wave of explosions and gunfire across Iraq.
- May 12 – Police General Iyad Imad Mehdi was shot by unidentified gunmen as he was driving to work.

=== June ===
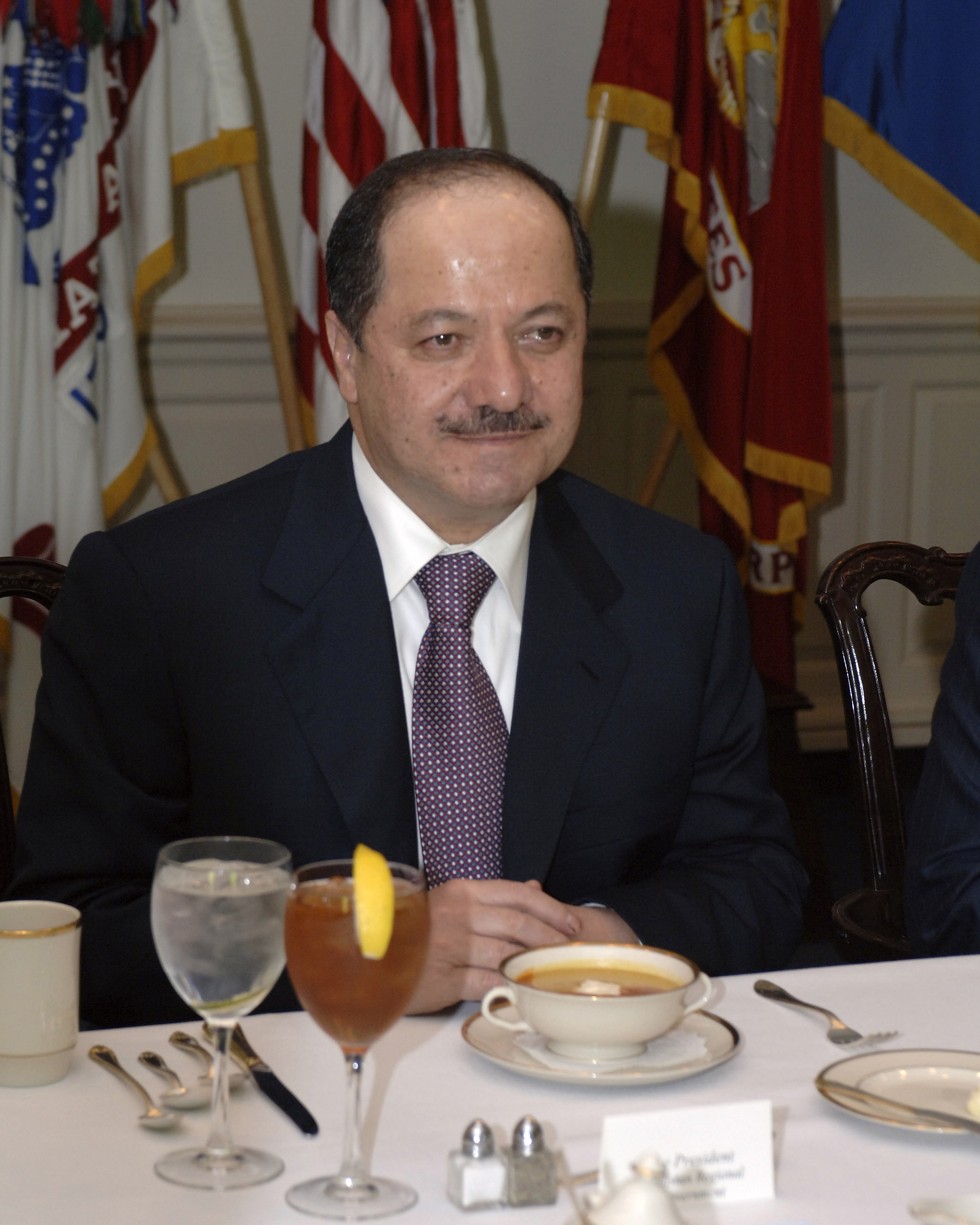
Masoud Barzani was elected as the President of the Iraqi Kurdistan region by the Parliament of Iraqi Kurdistan.

- June 12 –
  - French journalist Florence Aubenas and her Iraqi interpreter Hussein Hanoun al-Saadi were freed after five months of captivity in Iraq.
  - 28 bodies, believed to mainly be Sunni Arabs, have been found in Baghdad sidestreets.
  - Four US Soldiers die from two roadside bombs in Baghdad, bringing the total death toll of US troops to over 1,700.
  - Kurdish parliament in Northern Iraq elects Masoud Barzani as a president of the region
- June 14 – 22 people died following a suicide bombing in Kirkuk, northern Iraq.
- June 15 – Douglas Wood, an Australian hostage residing in California is released in Iraq after 47 days in captivity, and is now being moved to a secret location.
- June 16 – Five U.S. Marines die from a roadside bomb in Ramadi, Western Iraq.
- June 20 – A Suicide bomber in Iraq kills 13 policemen, and injured more than 100 people, in the city of Irbil, northern Iraq.

=== July ===
- July 3 – Ihab al-Sherif, Egypt's most senior envoy to Iraq is kidnapped by gunmen while buying a newspaper. He was to be promoted to ambassador, representing the first Arab nation to recognize the new Iraqi government.
- July 8 – Egyptian ambassador-designate Ihab al-Sharif is killed in Baghdad. A group related to Abu Musab al-Zarqawi claimed responsibility.
- July 13 – A suicide bomber kills 34 Iraqi boys and one US soldier in Baghdad. The boys were scooping up candy thrown from an American Humvee.
- July 16 – A suicide bomber detonates explosives near an LPG (propane) fuel tanker parked near a gas station south of Baghdad, sparking a massive explosion that kills more than 60 people and wounds as many as 100 in one of the worst insurgent attacks to hit the area since the US occupation of Iraq.
- July 17 – A fuel truck bomb kills 98 people south of Baghdad as three more suicide car bombers strike the Iraqi capital.
- July 21 – Algeria's two most senior diplomatic staff in Iraq are kidnapped from outside a restaurant in the western Mansour district.
- July 24 – At least 39 people, mostly civilians, are killed when a Suicide Truck Bomb exploded at a police station in the Iraqi Capital of Baghdad.
- July 25 – At least seven people died following a twin suicide car bomb attack on police checkpoints in the centre of the Iraqi Capital Baghdad.
- July 26 –
  - At least 12 workers were shot dead as they were driven away from the state owned factory they worked at, in the Abu Ghraib area, by insurgents.
  - Insurgents released a video showing the two diplomatic staff from Algeria kidnapped from Baghdad last week.
- July 27 –
  - Two US troops were killed following a bomb in Baghdad.
  - Two Algerian diplomatic staff who had been kidnapped by insurgents have been killed.
  - At least five people have died following an apparent Suicide Bomb blast outside a hospital in the Iraqi Capital, Baghdad.
  - The interim Prime Minister of Iraq, Ibrahim Jaafari, has called on US troops to leave Iraq soon.
  - Seven Iraqi soldiers, guarding a water plant north of Baghdad, have been shot and killed by Insurgents.

=== August ===
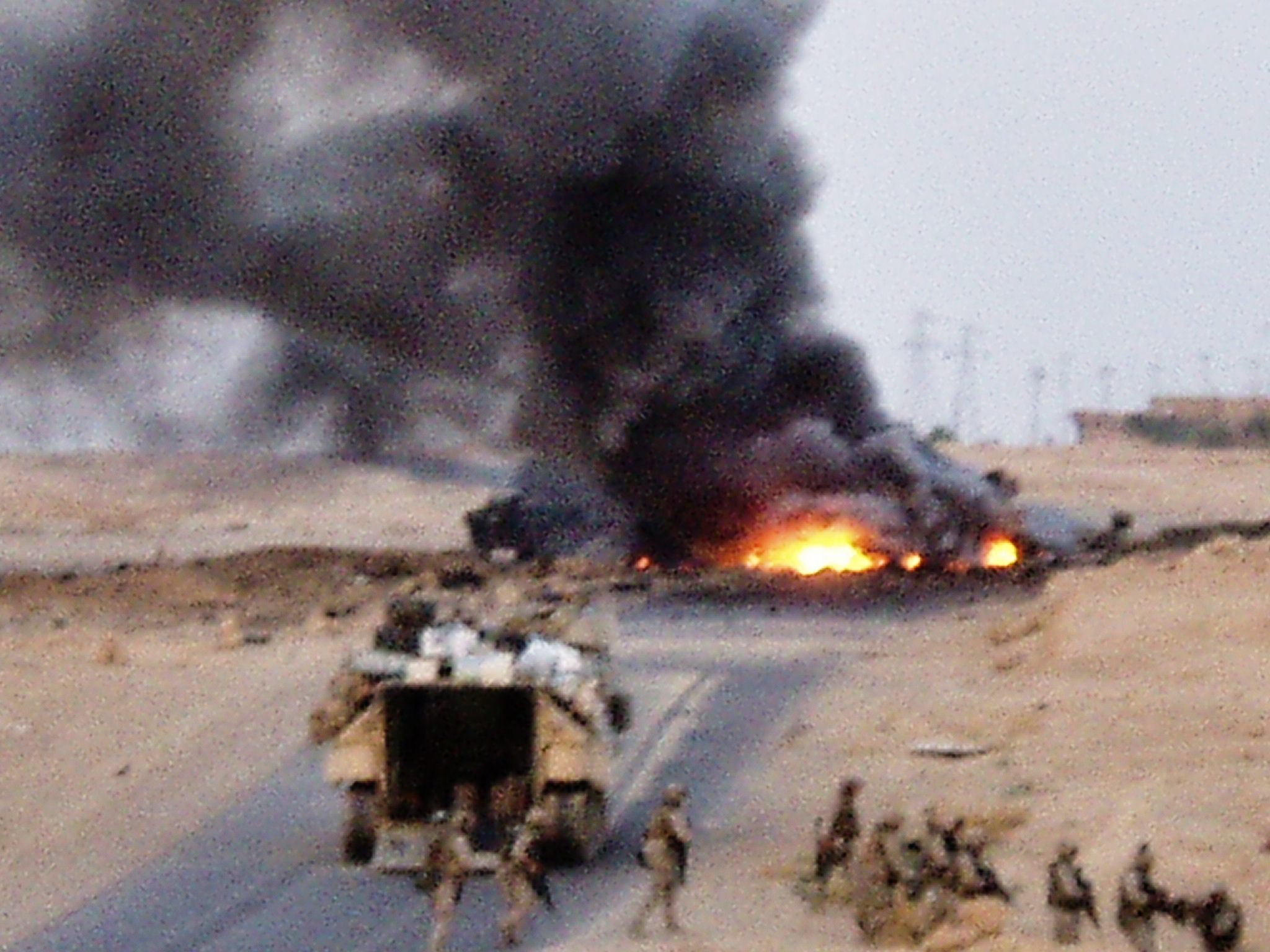
A roadside bombing in Iraq on August 3, 2005

- August Troop E 108th Cavalry, 48th MIB secure and control more than 40% insurgency activity in the "triangle of death". A known route used to supply the insurgency with ammunition and explosives to forces in Fallujah objecting the United States efforts on anti-terrorism.
- August 9 – Fallen soldiers honored in northern Iraq with stiffened restraint of sector
- August 13 – Three American soldiers are killed and one wounded when their vehicle strikes a pressure activated IED near Tuz Khurmatu.
- August 15 – Soldiers from 3rd Platoon, A Troop, 256 Infantry Brigade, engage and kill three enemy insurgents and wound at least four enemy insurgents while defending an attack in Baghdad.
- On 18 August 2005, an improvised explosive device (IED) killed the four-man crew of Saber 70, 3rd Battalion 69th Armor Regiment, 1st Brigade Combat Team, 3rd Infantry Division. in Samarra, Iraq while they served in support of Operation Iraqi Freedom.
- August 28 – Iraq's National Assembly signs the text of the proposed Iraqi constitution.
- August 31 – Up to 1,000 people die in a stampede on the Al-Aaimmah bridge after rumours of a suicide bomber cause panic amongst pilgrims on the shrine of the Imam Musa al-Kazim.

In late August 2005, violence occurred in Najaf, Nasiriyah, Diwaniyah, and Sadr City (Baghdad). The Shi'ite infighting was between the supporters of cleric Muqtada al-Sadr and the Badr Organization, who are backed by the Supreme Council for the Islamic Revolution in Iraq (SCIRI). Both sides blame each other for the violence. Some Shi'a National Assembly members and ministers suspended their membership in the council because of the violence. Since Sadr's Mahdi Army were expelled from the city of Najaf, fighting between rival Shi'a groups has ceased.

=== September ===
- September 1 – Iraq hanged three men in the first executions in the country since the 2003 invasion. They were part of the Jaish Ansar al-Sunna group and had been convicted of kidnapping and murdering three policemen and abducting, raping and killing Iraqi women. Iraqi President Jalal Talabani refused to sign the death warrants, but his Deputy President Adel Abdul Mehdi signed instead. Talabani has also said he will refuse to sign the death warrant of Saddam Hussein should he be convicted and sentenced to death.
- September 5 – Two British Soldiers have been killed following a roadside IED bomb in Basra, southern Iraq.
- September 7 –
  - 16 people die following a car bomb attack in the southern Iraqi city of Basra.
  - American hostage Roy Hallums is rescued in Iraq. He was kidnapped in November 2004 and later showed up on the video released by militants.
- September 10 – Iraqi forces and US troops attack Iraqi insurgents in Tal Afar.
- September 14 – More than 12 suicide bombings in Baghdad kill about 150 people and injure over 500, the largest number killed and wounded in the city during a single day since the 2003 invasion of Iraq. 114 people die when a car bomb explodes in a Shia district of Baghdad called Kadhimiya, near a shrine where two of Shi'ite Islam's most revered Imams are buried. 17 people die in the town of Taji, near Baghdad when gunmen storm their homes. Also on this day, Sunni insurgent leader Abu Musab al-Zarqawi declared "All-out" war against Iraq's Shi'ites in a statement released on a web forum that regularly carries al Qaeda postings.
- September 15 – At least 26 Iraqi police die following two car bombs in the Baghdad. Elsewhere, 3 Shia pilgrims are shot dead by a passenger in a passing car traveling to Karbala, two Iraqi police members are killed near Kirkuk and three civil servants die following an attack on the Ministry of Industry in East Baghdad.
- September 16 – At least 10 people died as a Shia Mosque is bombed in Tuz Khurmatu, Central Iraq.
- September 17 – At least 30 people die following an explosion at a market in the Iraqi capital of Baghdad.
- September 18 –
  - insurgents in the Iraqi capital of Baghdad kill three, including the Kurdish Member of Parliament, Faris Hussein.
  - Iraqi Police uncover at least 20 bodies in the river Tigris at Balad, north of Baghdad.
- September 19
  - Two UK soldiers under arrest by Iraqi police in Basra following a car chase. Police officials accused them of planting bombs in a public place while dressed in civilian clothes. After being approached by Iraqi police, the two soldiers reportedly fired on the police, killing two, after which they were apprehended, sparking clashes in which UK tanks came under attack. Two civilians were reportedly killed and three UK soldiers were injured. One Iraqi official claimed that 150 prisoners escaped including the two soldiers. The arrests followed the detention of two high-ranking officials of Muqtada al-Sadr's Mahdi Army
  - A US diplomat and three American security guards are killed following an insurgent Suicide car bomb attack in Mosul, northern Iraq.
  - At least 10 people, nine police and one civilian, have died following a series of explosions at a Shia festival marking the birth of the Imam Mehdi in Karbala.
- September 20 – Five U.S. troops die following three insurgent attacks, two in Ramadi and one in Baghdad.
- September 23 – Five Iraqis, including three members of the Iraqi Turkmen Front, die following a bomb on minibus in the capital Baghdad.
- September 24 – Human Rights Watch reports whistleblowers accuse U.S. troops of routinely torturing Iraqi prisoners and declining to investigate complaints.
- September 25 –
  - At least four Shia Muslims, believed to be members of the Mahdi Army are killed by US soldiers in a gunfight following a United States raid into Sadr City, eastern Baghdad.
  - Nine people die following a bomb attack on a police station in Hilla.
  - Over 100,000 people attend Anti Iraq War rally held in Washington, D.C.
- September 26
  - U.S. Army PFC Lynndie England is found guilty of six of seven charges by a military court in connection with the Abu Ghraib prisoner abuse scandal. A sentencing hearing is scheduled to begin September 27.
  - Five school teachers were killed in an insurgent attack in Iskandariya, south of Baghdad.
  - At least 7 people die when a car-bomb explodes as they queued at the police academy in the Iraqi capital Baghdad.
- September 27 – Abu Azzam, claimed by the US to be an aide to Abu Musab al-Zarqawi, was shot dead by US soldiers in Baghdad.
- September 28 –
  - The Pentagon announces it will investigate allegations that US soldiers posted photographs of dead Iraqis on a website so as to get access to free Internet porn. CAIR had earlier called for the investigation after the details of the site came to light.
  - An 82-year-old British man was manhandled out of Labour Party Conference for loudly protesting that Jack Straw was lying about Britain's involvement with the Conflict in Iraq.
- September 29 – Suicide bombers killed at least 114 people in the Shi'ite town of Balad, north of Baghdad.
- September 30 – 10 people die following a car bomb in Hillah, Iraq.

=== October ===
- October 4 – Five U.S. soldiers die during sweeps of insurgent-held towns in Iraq.
- October 5 – The British Government alleges that Iran is responsible for recent attacks on British military forces.
- October 6 – As Iraqi president Jalal Talabani tells UK Prime Minister Tony Blair any troop withdrawal would be a "catastrophe", 10 people die following a bomb near the Ministry of Oil in Baghdad.
- October 7 –
  - At least twenty-nine Iraqi fighters and six U.S. Marines are killed in major fighting in western Iraq.
  - British forces have detained 12 people, including three police officers, in connection with a series of deadly attacks on UK forces in southern Iraq.
- October 10 – Insurgent attacks throughout Iraq leave seven Iraqis, two security officials from the Arab league and one U.S. soldier dead.
- October 11 – Insurgent suicide bomb attacks leave over 30 people dead in Talafar, North West Iraq.
- October 12 –
  - At least 30 people die following an insurgent suicide bomb attack in Talafar, North Western Iraq, the second such attack in as many days.
  - Iraq's Constitutional referendum: the prospects of the proposed Iraqi constitution being approved in Saturday's referendum are boosted by a deal struck with a major Sunni Arab party, the Iraqi Islamic Party.
- October 13 – Iraq's Constitutional Referendum: A four-day curfew has been announced in order to hamper terrorists. Early voting has begun.
- October 15 –
  - Jean Ziegler, a Human rights investigator and senior United Nations official, accuses the United States and occupying forces of "using hunger and deprivation of water as a weapon of war against the civilian population" in Iraq.
  - The Iraqi people go to the polls to vote on whether to approve the proposed constitution, amidst heavy security.
  - Five US Army soldiers and 2 members of the Iraqi Army die in Anbar providence in the only major act of violence committed on this first election day when their Bradley vehicle ran over and IED killing all 7 individuals instantly.
- October 17 – The U.S. claims to have killed 70 insurgents near Ramadi in eastern Iraq. However, eyewitnesses maintain that most of those killed were innocent civilians, and photographs released show locals burying at least 18 children, including infants.
- October 18 –
  - Two U.S. Marines and around four Iraqi insurgents are killed in Western Iraq.
  - The Independent Electoral Commission of Iraq issues a statement saying that statistical irregularities in the constitution ratification referendum on October 15, 2005 require that the balloting be audited, which will delay the announcement of the final count. According to the New York Times, "The statement made no mention of the possibility of fraud." though according to the BBC "Iraq's independent electoral commission says statistical irregularities in last week's referendum could indicate fraud."
- October 19 – Saddam Hussein goes on trial in Baghdad for crimes against humanity. The former President of Iraq is led into court with seven associates, charged with ordering the killing of 143 Shi'a men in the town of Dujail in 1982. If convicted, Hussein could face capital punishment.
- October 20 –
  - Four U.S. soldiers are killed in two insurgent attacks north of Baghdad, Iraq.
  - A defense lawyer for one of Saddam Hussein's co-defendants is kidnapped.
- October 21 – Saadoun Sughaiyer al-Janabi, the defense lawyer of Awad Hamed al-Bandar in the Al-Dujail trial, is found dead of gunshot wounds near a Baghdad mosque, after having been kidnapped on Thursday evening by unknown assailants.
- October 22 – Army Staff Sgt. George T. Alexander Jr., 34, of Killeen, Texas becomes the 2000th American death in Iraq (AP). U.S.-led forces reported killing 20 "terrorists suspected of sheltering al Qaeda in Iraq foreign fighters" in a series of raids on safe houses near Husaybah.
- October 24 – The Palestine Hotel, Baghdad which houses the foreign journalists was bombed with three consecutive car bombs. This hotel was rocketed previously on November 21, 2003.
- October 25 – Iraq's Independent Electoral Commission announces that the country's draft constitution was approved in the vote held October 15.
- October 26 – Three United States Soldiers die in two separate insurgent attacks in Baghdad and near Baqouba.
- October 27 – At least 20 Shia Militia members and Iraqi Police have died following a Sunni Arab ambush in Nahrawan, south east of Baghdad.
- October 29 – More than 20 people die when a car bomb detonates in Howaider, a Shia village near Baquba, 60 miles north of Baghdad.
- October 31 –
  - A Pentagon report suggests that since 2004 about 26,000 Iraqi people have been either killed or injured in attacks by insurgents.
  - Reports indicate that 40 people have died following a United States Air raid near Karabilah in Western Iraq. The military says it was a targeted strike against Al Qaeda, whereas doctors treating the injured and dead said the dead were all civilians, including many women and children.
  - 6 U.S. Soldiers die in two separate insurgent attacks.
  - Italian Prime Minister, Silvio Berlusconi tries to distance himself from the United States President George W. Bush and claims that he "tried on several occasions to convince the American president not to wage war".

=== November ===
- November 1 – United States Senate Minority Leader Harry Reid and his fellow Democrats force a closed session of the Senate over misinformed intelligence that led to the Iraq war and evasion of a congressional inquiry.
- November 3 – Seven U.K. troops accused of murdering an Iraqi civilian have had their cases dropped after a judge ruled that there was insufficient evidence against the soldiers and that the Iraqi witnesses lied.
- November 7 – India's foreign minister, K. Natwar Singh, is forced to step down from his post amid allegations that he and the governing Indian National Congress had illegally benefited from the UN Oil-for-Food Programme in Iraq.
- November 8 -
  - Trials of Saddam Hussein: Three gunmen assassinate Adel al-Zubeidi, the defense lawyer for Taha Yassin Ramadan, a former Iraqi Vice President under Saddam Hussein.
  - Italian state-owned channel Rai News 24 airs a controversial documentary in which Iraqi people and ex-United States soldiers report that white phosphorus, a chemical weapon, and Mk-77 napalm bombs were used by the U.S. Army against civilians in Fallujah the previous year.
- November 9 – In the United States, the visit of Iraqi Deputy Premier Ahmed Chalabi to the Department of State and Department of the Treasury arouses controversy.
- November 10 – At least 30 people have died following an insurgent suicide bomb attack on a restaurant in Baghdad.
- November 12 –
  - The United Nations Secretary General, Kofi Annan, makes a surprise visit to Iraq and expresses support for an Arab League conference discussing cooperation with Iraq's many factions. (BBC)
  - Four people die following a car bomb in Baghdad.
- November 13 – Iraqi president Jalal Talabani tells British television that Iraqi troops could replace UK forces by the close of 2006.
- November 15 – 173 prisoners are found in an Iraqi government bunker in Baghdad, having been starved, beaten and tortured.
- November 18 -
  - A series of suicide bombings kill 74 Shia worshippers at two Shi'ite mosques in the town of Khanaqin in religiously-mixed Diyala, destroying the structures. 80 people were also wounded. In Baghdad two car bombs destroy the blast wall protecting a hotel housing foreign journalists and kill eight Iraqis.
  - Two car bombs strike outside a Baghdad interior ministry building at the centre of a detainee abuse scandal.
  - The United States House of Representatives reject a Republican resolution offered by Duncan Hunter (R-California) "expressing the sense of the House of Representatives that the deployment of United States forces in Iraq be terminated immediately" by a vote of 403-3. Ohio Republican Jean Schmidt is forced by Democratic (and quiet Republican) protests to apologise to Pennsylvania Democrat John Murtha for reading a letter from a marine in which those wishing to "cut and run" from Iraq are called "cowards".
- November 19 –
  - In a speech to U.S. troops in South Korea, U.S. President George W. Bush rejects calls for a timetable for withdrawing US troops from Iraq, laying out why he believes the American presence in Iraq should continue.
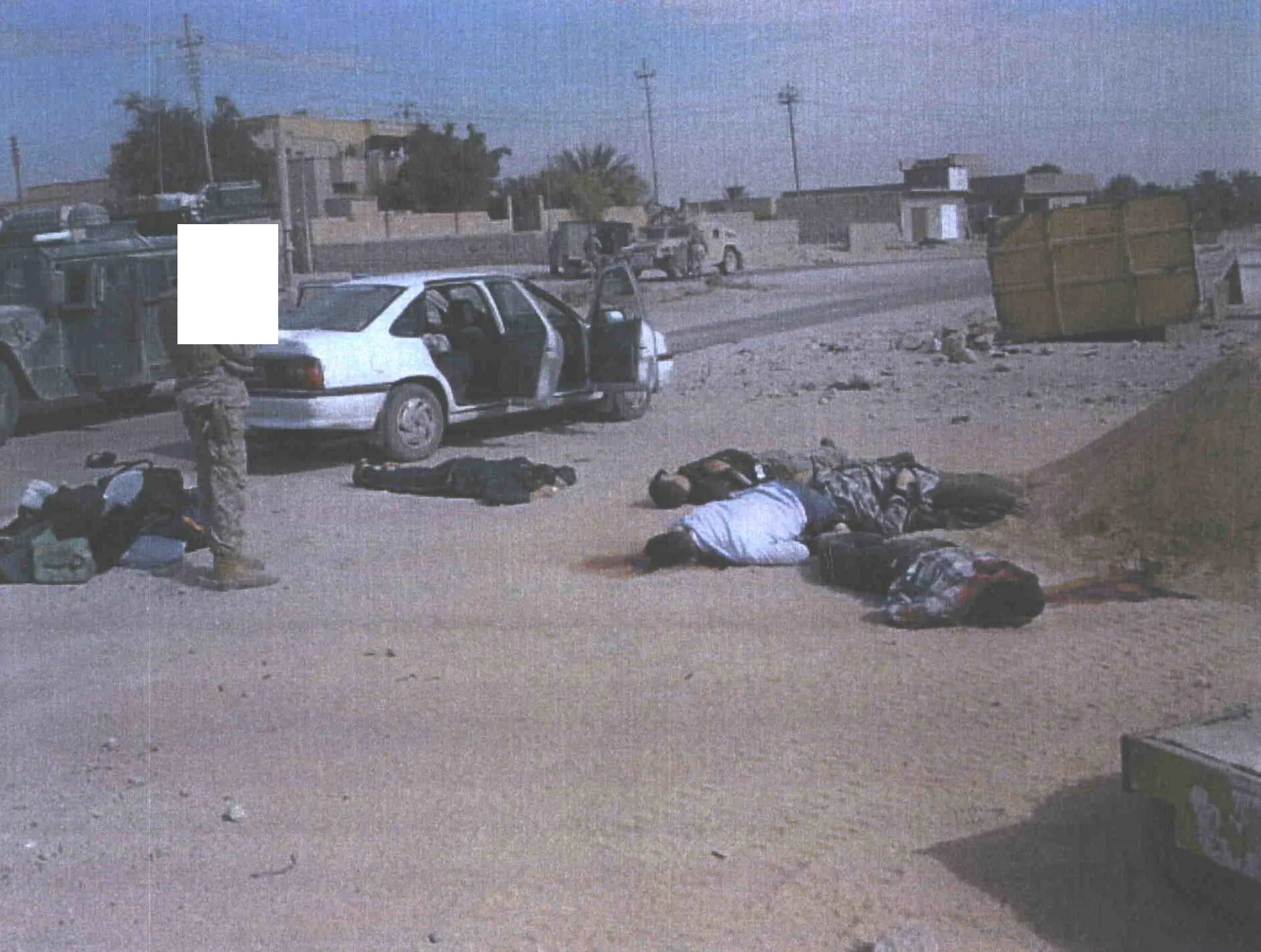
  - Haditha massacre image released August 2024.
    United states marines kill 24 Iraqi civilians in what is known as the Haditha massacre. After an IED targeted the marines' convoy in the city of Haditha in the Al Anbar province, the marines shot and killed 5 civilian men in a nearby car, then proceeded to enter nearby houses and killing 19 people including a 3 year old child.
- November 20 –
  - At least forty people died following a series of insurgent and American led attacks.
  - The Independent reports that British-trained police tortured and killed at least two Iraqis using electric drills.
  - One British soldier dies following a roadside Bomb in Basra, southern Iraq.
- November 21 –
  - Five Iraqi civilians, including three children, are shot dead by U.S. troops as they approached a checkpoint in Baquba. The minibus they were travelling in failed to stop as it approached a roadblock.
  - Arab League members demand a timetable for the withdrawal of coalition troops from Iraq.
- November 23 –
  - One suicide car bomber kills 18 people, mostly Iraqi police in an ambush in the northern Iraqi city of Kirkuk.
  - The Prime minister of Italy, Silvio Berlusconi, states that the Italian Army could leave Iraq by the end of 2006.
- November 24 –
  - 15 people die after a suicide bomb attack in Hilla.
  - Prisoners at an Iraqi detention centre revealed to the BBC details of apparent widespread use of torture and abuse in prisons and detention centres in Iraq.
  - At least thirty people have died following a car bomb outside a hospital in the Iraqi capital of Baghdad.
  - Khadim Sarhid al-Hemaiyim, one of the most important Sunni Arab tribal leaders in Iraq, has been shot dead, along with his three sons and a son-in-law in Baghdad. The gunman appeared to be a member of the new Iraqi Army.
- November 25 – German archaeologist Susanne Osthoff is kidnapped in Iraq.
- November 26 – Four Western peace activists are kidnapped and held hostage by a previously unknown group and threatened with execution unless the United States releases all Iraqi prisoners.
- November 27 -
  - Four Westerners have been kidnapped in Iraq while in Baghdad.
  - The former Prime Minister of Iraq, Iyad Allawi, has claimed in The Observer newspaper, that human rights abuses by members of the Government of Iraq are as bad now as they were in the time of Saddam Hussein.
- November 28 -
  - Iraqi President Jalal Talabani called the former prime minister Iyad Allawi's comments "nonsense". Allawi claimed that the human rights abuses in Iraq were as bad now as they were under Saddam Hussein. Talabani stated that the government was against any form of torture or harming of prisoners.
  - The tribunal trying Saddam Hussein and seven co-defendants adjourned for a second time after hearing posthumous evidence.
- November 30 –
  - The US military has been covertly paying to run news stories written by US Military "information operations" troops. The stories, usually praising the work of the United States Military, appeared in Baghdad newspapers.
  - A new campaign against Iraqi insurgents begins with joint U.S.–Iraqi troops conducting Operation Iron Hammer in western Iraq.
  - New policy document on American involvement in Iraq, "National Strategy for Victory in Iraq", is published by the White House.

=== December ===
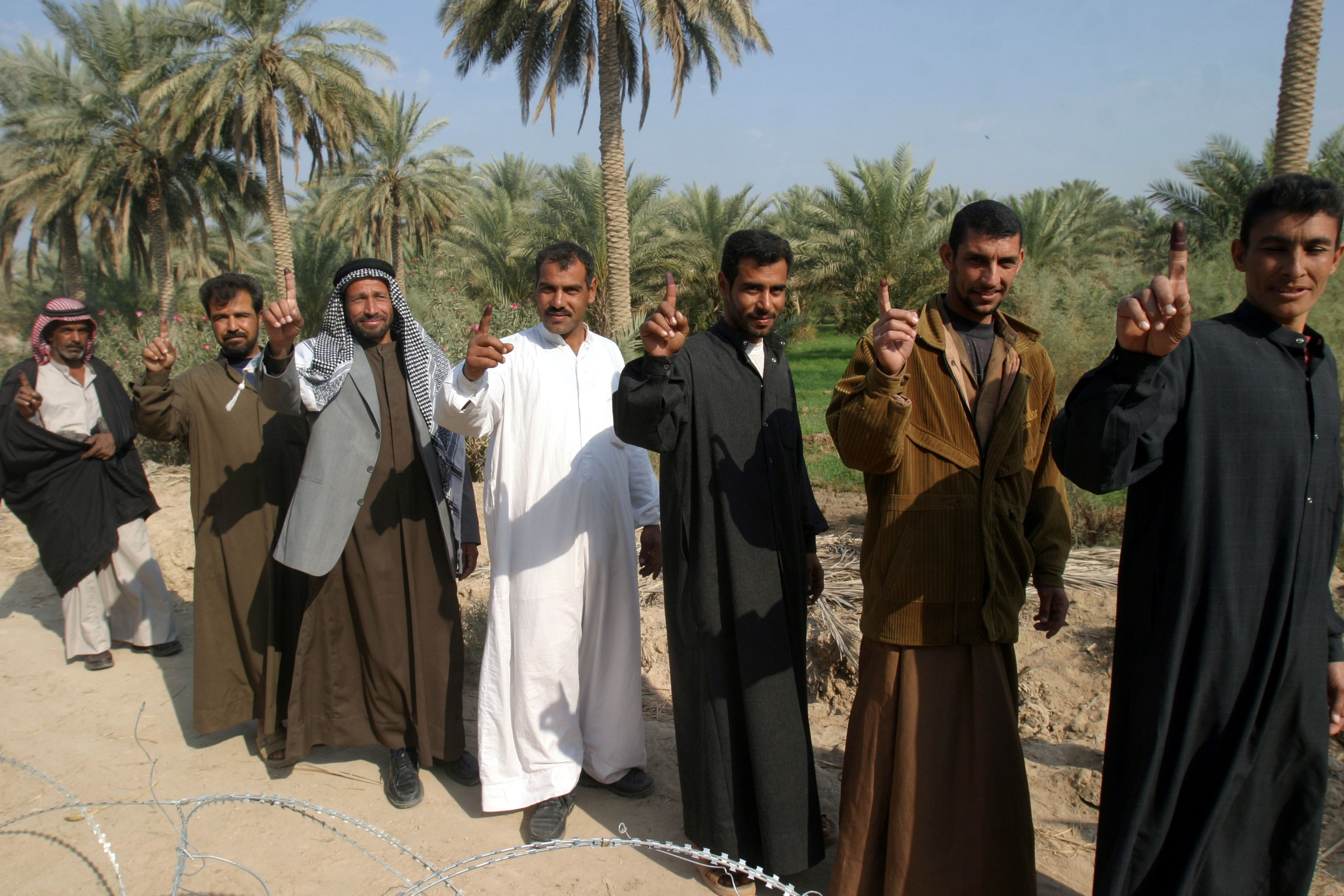
A group of Iraqi citizens walk down a path showing their purple fingers, signifying that they voted in their country's first parliamentary election.

- December – The U.S. has long maintained its involvement there is with the support of the Iraqi people, but in 2005 when asked directly, 82–87% of the Iraqi populace was opposed to U.S. occupation and wanted U.S. troops to leave. 47% of Iraqis supported attacking U.S. troops. The poll taken also showed that a large majority of Iraqis favored setting a timeline for the withdrawal of US forces, though this majority divided over whether it should be six months or two years.
- December 2–10 U.S. Marines are killed following an insurgent roadside bomb attack in Falluja.
- December 3 – An attack about 60 miles from Baghdad, involving a roadside bomb, kills 19 Iraqi soldiers.
- December 4 -
  - Former chief of the RUC police force will head a British investigation into possible infiltration of Iraq's police force by insurgents.
  - Former prime minister Iyad Allawi says he survived an assassination attempt at the Imam Ali Mosque in Najaf. Police say his group fled from the Shi'ite Muslim shrine under a hail of debris by a mob.
- December 6 -
  - Two suicide bombers kill 27 Iraqi Police at a police academy in Baghdad.
  - Deposed Iraq president Saddam Hussein has refused to attend his trial for crimes against humanity, throwing the sometimes chaotic Iraqi proceedings into further confusion.
- December 7 – Nobel Prize in Literature winner Harold Pinter accuses Britain and the United States of engaging in state terrorism in Iraq and demands the prosecution of George W. Bush and Tony Blair.
- December 8 –
  - Truck bomb detonates on checkpoint 44 killing one U.S. soldier and wounding many Iraqi police
  - At least 32 people have died following an attack on a bus in Baghdad.
- December 13 –
  - Four American soldiers are killed following an IED attack in the Iraqi capital Baghdad.
  - The U.S. ambassador issues a statement saying that the total number of abused prisoners found so far in jails run by the Shiite-led Interior Ministry is about 121.
  - The President of the United States, George W. Bush, acknowledges the deaths of approximately 30,000 Iraqi civilians since the commencement of the Iraq War.
- December 14 – U.S. President George W. Bush says that the decision to invade Iraq in 2003 was the result of faulty intelligence, and accepts responsibility for that decision. He maintains that his decision was still justified.
- December 15 – Voting starts in Iraq to elect the first permanent 275-member Iraqi National Assembly under the new Constitution of Iraq.
- December 16 –
  - Bulgaria starts withdrawing its troops from Iraq.
  - Iraqi Police claim that they captured Abu Musab al-Zarqawi in 2004 and then released him by mistake.
- December 18 – President George W. Bush defends the Iraq War in a rare primetime Oval Office address. He said, "Not only can we win the war in Iraq—we are winning the war in Iraq."
- December 19 –
  - Early returns in the Iraqi legislative election, December 2005 indicate that religious parties have done quite well, winning up 80% of the vote. Election officials are investigating more than 1,000 complaints about irregularities, 20 of them considered serious. Final results will not be released until early January.
  - An insurgent group broadcasts a video over the Internet of what they claim is the death of American Ronald Allen Schulz.
- December 21 – The former President of Iraq, Saddam Hussein, claims in court that American officials tortured him. Part of his testimony is censored and the US strongly denies the accusations.
- December 22 – Tony Blair makes a surprise visit to Basra in Iraq, to address 4,000 British soldiers and discuss withdrawal. He states that "we can eventually draw down our own capability" once the Iraqi forces "build up their own strength".
- December 27 –
  - The new right-wing government of Poland announces it will keep troops in Iraq until the end of 2006, longer than previously planned.
  - A mass grave is discovered in the predominantly Shia city of Karbala south of Baghdad, Iraqi police said.
- December 29 – The Associated Press reports story of Farris Hassan, a young Iraqi-American teenager who travelled to Iraq without informing his parents and was picked up by the 101st Airborne.

== Notable deaths ==
- January 4 – Ali Al-Haidri, governor of Baghdad Governorate
- March 4 – Nicola Calipari, Italian secret agent

== See also ==
- Iraq War
