= Advisor Training Group =

- Twentynine Palms, California
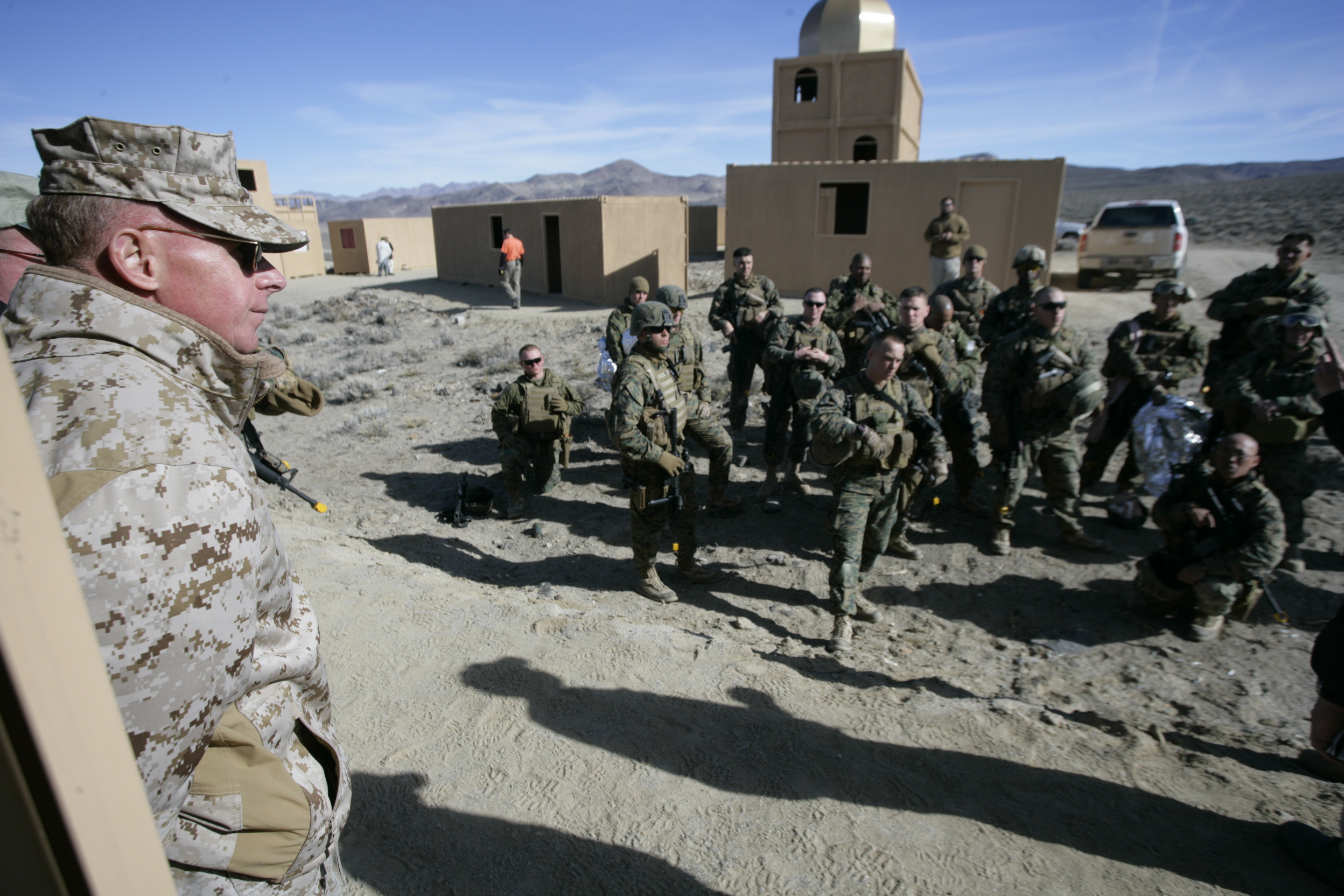
- ATG training ETTs

Site information
- Type: Military Training Organization
- Controlled by: United States Marine Corps

Location
- Coordinates: 34°13′54″N 116°03′42″W

Site history
- In use: Established in 2008

The Advisor Training Group is a United States Marine Corps training organization established in 2008 to train Iraqi Military Transition Teams (MTTs) and Afghan Embedded Training Teams (ETTs).

== Mission ==
“Train Marine Corps advisor teams to advise, mentor, and train foreign military, police, and border units in operational techniques and procedures to combat terrorism and counterinsurgency.”

== Organization ==
Commanded by a Colonel, the ATG consists of 25 to 30 Marines and nearly 400 roleplayers who work together in teaching the Marines the subtleties of training the security forces they will be embedded with when they deploy.

== Training ==
Every Advisor Team must complete a graduate level Advisor Skills Course, learning both hard and soft skills with a final field exercise designed to emphasize the mentoring role of the mission. To assist in making the training as realistic as possible, Afghan-American citizens act as role players. The men and women play a variety of roles ranging from ANA, shopkeeper, ANP, townsperson, to village elder. Taking teams of 14 to 20 Marines into the field, the Advisor Training Group uses a 28-day training cycle to teach the Marines the subtleties of training the ANSF. Each training cycle culminates in a Mission Rehearsal Exercise or MRX, in which the Marines are graded in how they interact and advise their Afghan counterparts during a series of high-stress exercises ranging from complex ambushes, vehicle-borne improvised explosive device (VBIED) strikes, detainee processing, jirgas, force protection, morale and discipline, and air medevacs.
