= Dana J. H. Pittard =

United States Army general (born 1959)

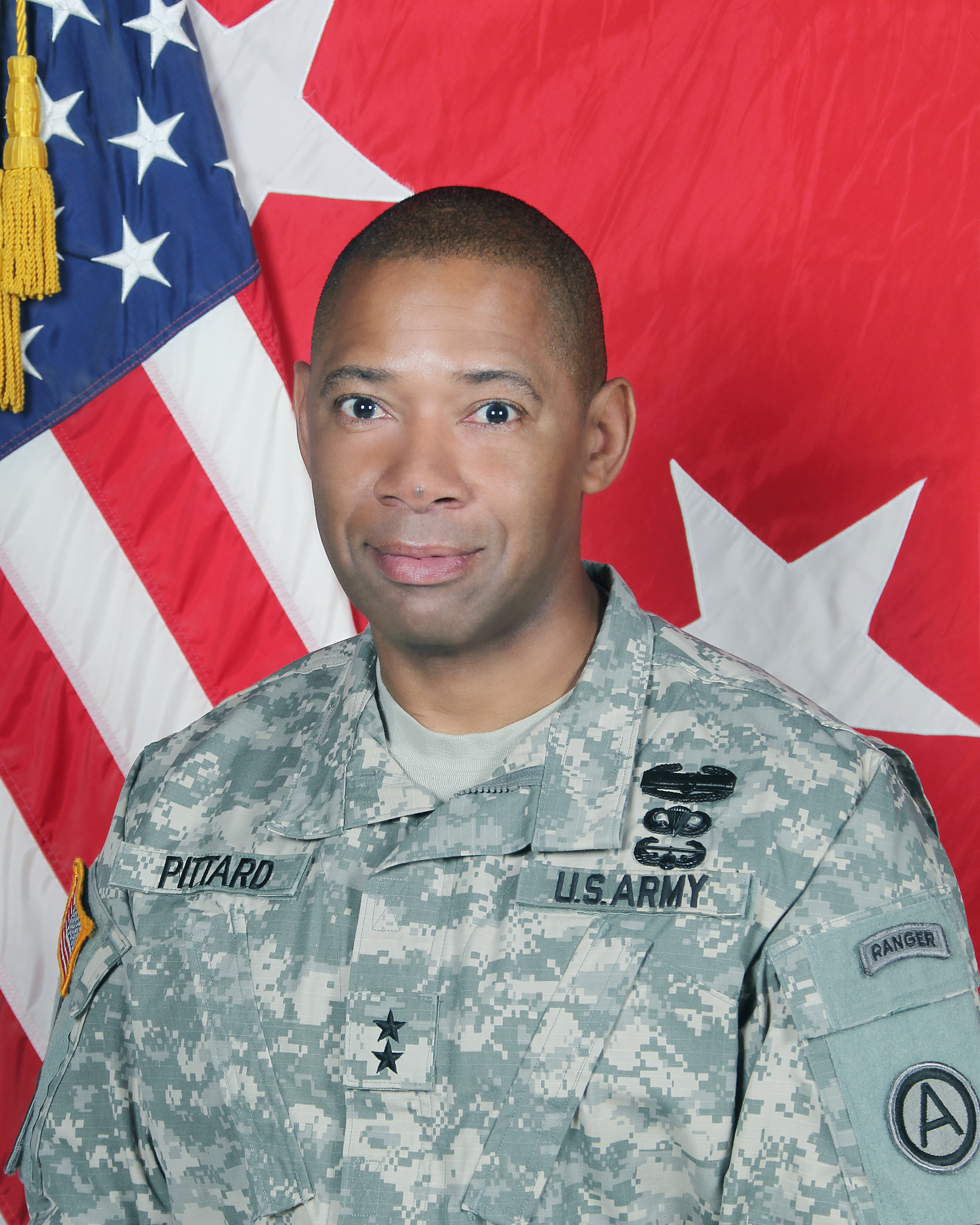
- Dana Pittard in 2013
- Born: March 11, 1959 (age 67); Okinawa, Japan
- Military career
- Allegiance: United States
- Branch: United States Army
- Service years: 1981–2015
- Rank: Major general
- Commands: 1st Armored Division; Iraq Assistance Group; 3rd Brigade, 1st Infantry Division
- Conflicts: Gulf War: Operation Desert Storm; Iraq War: Operation Iraqi Freedom; Operation Inherent Resolve
- Awards: Distinguished Service Medal (2); Defense Superior Service Medal; Legion of Merit (2); Bronze Star Medal (4)

Dana James Hillian Pittard (born March 11, 1959) is a retired United States Army general officer. He served as Joint Force Land Component Commander-Iraq (JFLCC-I) from June 9, 2014, during the coalition response to the incursions by the Islamic State in Iraq and the Levant (Daesh) into Iraq from Syria. Pittard was deputy commanding general of operations (DCG-O) for ARCENT, the United States Central Command/Third Army, based in Kuwait, until 2015. He was also the commanding general of the 1st Armored Division and Fort Bliss in El Paso, Texas. He was also Deputy Chief of Staff of Operations & Training at the Training and Doctrine Command (TRADOC) at Fort Monroe, Virginia and commanding general of the National Training Center, Fort Irwin, California.

== Early life and education ==
Pittard was born in Okinawa Prefecture, Japan as his father, a soldier in the United States Army was stationed there. A graduate of Eastwood High School in El Paso, Texas, Pittard had previously lived at Fort Bliss as a boy, a station he was later to command. Pittard graduated from the United States Military Academy, Armor Officer Basic Course, Infantry Officer Advance Course, and the Command and General Staff College. He holds a master's degree in military arts and science from the United States Army School of Advanced Military Studies at Fort Leavenworth, Kansas. He also has completed a National Security Fellowship at the John F. Kennedy School of Government at Harvard University.

== Career ==
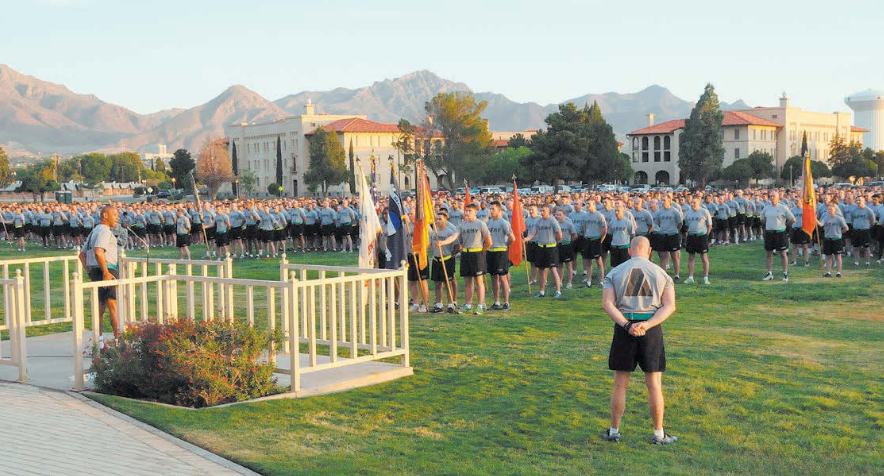
Pittard addressing soldiers of the First Armored Division, in a formation before a post run at Fort Bliss, on May 14, 2013.

Pittard received his commission as an armor officer in 1981. His first operational assignment was with the 1st Infantry Division (Mechanized) at Fort Riley, Kansas, in 1982. He served as a tank platoon leader and tank company executive officer in 2-63 Armor; then as a scout platoon leader and battalion S1 in 3-37 Armor. In 1984, he served as an admissions officer at the United States Military Academy; and in 1985 was assigned to Bad Kissingen, Germany, as the Squadron S4 for 2nd Squadron, 11th Armored Cavalry Regiment (ACR).

In October 1986, Pittard commanded E Troop, 2nd Squadron, 11th ACR until May 1988. He next commanded Fox Company, 40th Armor (Berlin Brigade) from June 1988 until March 1990. In April 1990, he commanded D Company, 1-37 Armor at Vilseck, Germany, and led his unit in combat in Iraq during Operation Desert Storm. Upon returning to Germany, he served as an assistant S3 in 3rd Brigade, 3rd Infantry Division. He next served at Fort Hood, Texas as the assistant G3, chief of plans and exercises for 2nd Armored Division; the S3 for 1-67 Armor; and then as the S3, 2nd Brigade, 4th Infantry Division.

Pittard served as a military aide to President Bill Clinton from November 1996 until January 1999. In June 1999, he assumed command of 1-32 Armor/1-14 Cavalry at Fort Lewis, Washington as a part of the army's first Stryker Brigade until June 2001. Pittard took command of 3rd Brigade, 1st Infantry Division (3/1 ID) in July 2002 and led the unit on deployments to Kosovo (2002–2003) and to combat in Iraq (2004–2005). (Pittard observed that he and Captain Humayun Khan, who was killed in Iraq, both led the same platoon of 3/1 ID, for which Pittard was later brigade commander.) In July 2005, Pittard was assigned as the assistant division commander for maneuver, 24th Infantry Division later to transition to the 1st Infantry Division. In July 2006, he deployed on Operation Iraqi Freedom where he assumed command of the Iraq Assistance Group, while still serving as the assistant division commander for maneuver of the 1st Infantry Division. He was the commander of the Iraq Assistance Group in combat in Iraq from June 2006 through June 30, 2007, and transferred command to Brigadier General James C. Yarbrough. On August 8, 2007, he assumed command of Fort Irwin. On December 18, 2008, Pittard announced his plans to leave Fort Irwin sometime in March 2009. He became the deputy chief of staff for operations and training at TRADOC in March 2009.

On July 9, 2010, Pittard assumed command of Fort Bliss, Texas. In May 2011, Pittard assumed command of the 1st Armored Division.

On May 24, 2013, Pittard relinquished command of the 1st Armored Division and Fort Bliss to Major General Sean MacFarland. Pittard was then the deputy commanding general of operations (DCG-O) for ARCENT until 2015. In 2014, Pittard became the Joint Forces Land Component Command-Iraq (JFLCC-I) in Baghdad and led the initial fight against ISIS in Iraq.

The 3rd U.S. Infantry Regiment (The Old Guard) conducted Pittard's general officer retirement ceremony on September 30, 2015, at Joint Base Myer–Henderson Hall, Military District of Washington.

=== Suicide prevention ===
During the period Pittard commanded the post, Fort Bliss earned the LivingWorks Community of Excellence Award for effective suicide prevention and intervention programs in July 2012. According to Department of Defense statistics, Fort Bliss had the Army's lowest suicide rate in 2012 while Pittard was commanding general. Pittard was criticized for his personal blog statement that he was "personally fed up with soldiers who are choosing to take their own lives so that others can clean up their mess." This statement, while seen as self-centered and callous, had been triggered by a soldier who had committed suicide in the presence of his two young daughters on Christmas morning. Several of the suicide prevention reforms instituted by Pittard at Fort Bliss have propagated to other Army installations.

== Awards and decorations ==
Combat Action Badge
Basic Parachutist Badge
Air Assault Badge
Ranger Tab

Army Distinguished Service Medal with oak leaf cluster
Defense Superior Service Medal
Legion of Merit with oak leaf cluster
Bronze Star Medal with three oak leaf clusters and valor device
Defense Meritorious Service Medal
Meritorious Service Medal with silver oak leaf cluster
Army Commendation Medal
Army Achievement Medal with three oak leaf clusters

Presidential Service Badge

Pittard was awarded the General Douglas MacArthur Leadership Award. He also wears the Order of St George, the Order of St Barbara, and the Order of the de Fleury Medal.

== Criticism ==
Major General Pittard was reprimanded in February 2015 for "perception of favoritism", for a defense contract award meant to make Fort Bliss an energy-efficient government installation, to a firm that was run by two of his former West Point classmates. After a three-year (2011-2014) investigation by the Federal Bureau of Investigation (FBI) and U.S. Army Inspector General, all major allegations against General Pittard were found to be unsubstantiated. One of his two West Point classmates was convicted on sixteen counts of fraud in federal court according to documents obtained by The Washington Post, under the Freedom of Information Act. Major General Pittard had long been considered a rising star in the Army.

Pittard maintains that he did not do "anything legally, morally, or ethically wrong." He told the El Paso Times that the charges against him were "unsubstantiated" during the investigation, but that the process had no mechanism for him to rebut the charges which were based on an anonymous tip.

== Post-army career ==
Pittard serves as a vice-president of Allison Transmission, Inc. In 2018, Pittard was named to Savoy magazine's list of the "Most Influential Blacks in Corporate America". He is a triathlete, and the co-author of the book, Hunting the Caliphate (2018), which tells the story of the initial fight against ISIS in Iraq in 2014.

Military offices
Preceded by Major General John P. McLaren	Iraq Assistance Group; 2006–2007	Succeeded by Brigadier General James C. Yarbrough
