= James C. Yarbrough =

United States Army general

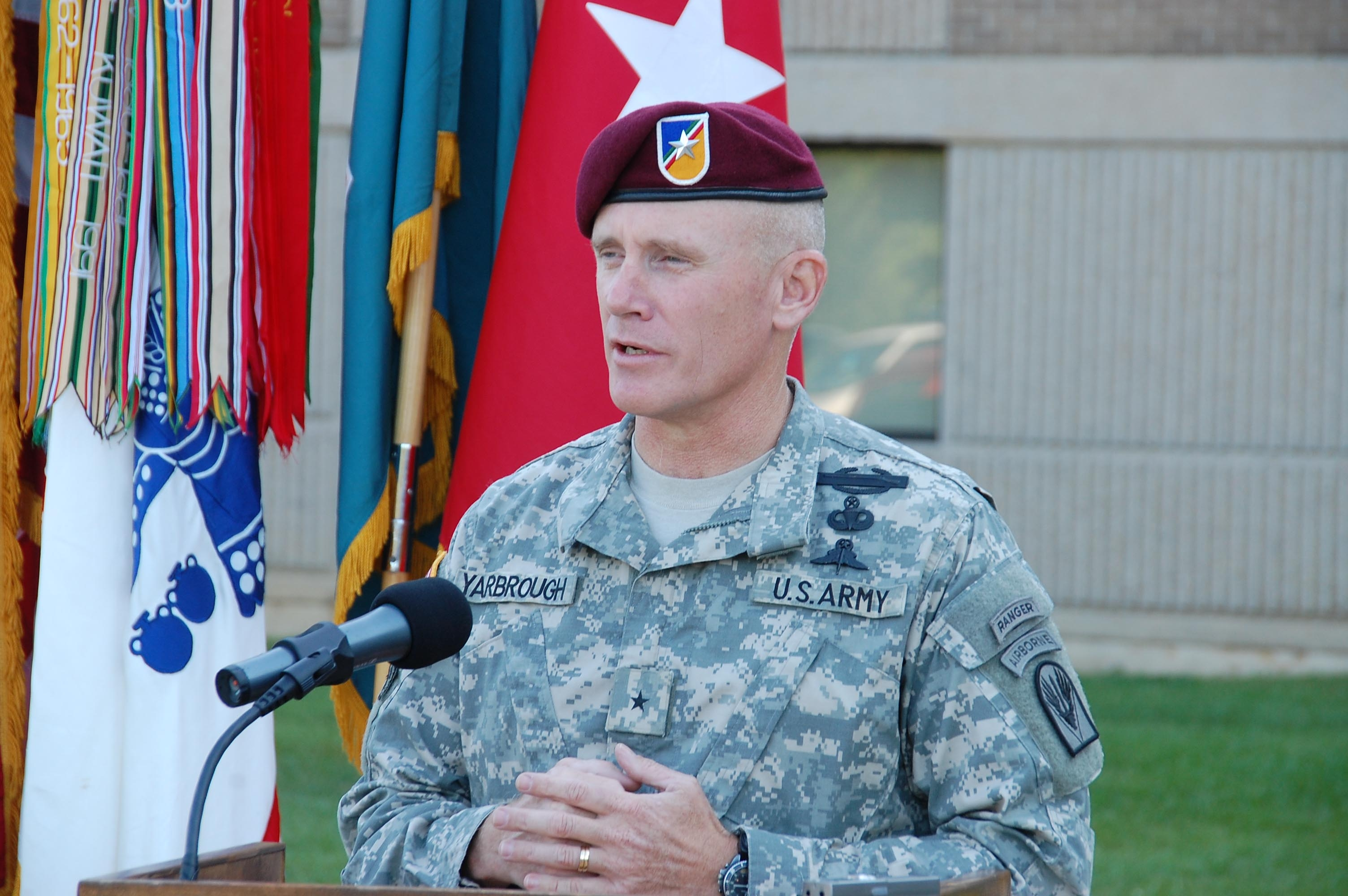
- Yarbrough, as commander JRTC, holding a press conference at Fort Polk in 2008
- Military career
- Allegiance: United States
- Branch: United States Army
- Service years: 1979–2011
- Rank: Brigadier General
- Commands: Joint Readiness Training Center; Iraq Assistance Group; 173rd Airborne Brigade; 2nd Battalion, 502nd Infantry Regiment
- Conflicts: United States invasion of Grenada; Iraq War
- Awards: Defense Superior Service Medal; Legion of Merit (3)

James C. Yarbrough is an American retired brigadier general in the United States Army.

== Education ==
Yarbrough earned a Bachelor of Science degree in Management from Tulane University in May 1979 and, as a Distinguished Military Graduate, was commissioned a second lieutenant of Infantry through the Reserve Officers' Training Corps (ROTC). He earned a Master of Arts degree in Business Management from Webster University in 1991 and a Master of Strategic Studies in 1999. Yarbrough's military education includes the Infantry Officer's Basic and Advanced Courses; Air Assault, Airborne, Ranger and Pathfinder Schools; Jumpmaster, Military Freefall and Freefall Jumpmaster Courses; and United States Army Command and General Staff College, and the United States Army War College.

== Assignments ==
=== 1979–1984 ===
Yarbrough's first assignment was with the 101st Airborne Division (AASLT), where he served as Rifle Platoon Leader and Anti-Tank Platoon Leader in 1st Battalion, 327th Infantry from 1979 to 1981. He was later reassigned to 2nd Ranger Battalion, 75th Infantry from 1981 to 1984, and participated in Operation Urgent Fury in Grenada.

=== 1985–1998 ===
After graduating from the Infantry Officer's Advanced Course, Yarbrough commanded a rifle company in 1st Battalion, 31st Infantry, in the Republic of Korea, from 1985 to 1986. Following company command, he served as Operations Officer and Chief, Current Operations, United States Army Special Operations Command, then Aide-de-Camp to the Commander of the XVIII Airborne Corps at Fort Bragg, North Carolina. He then, he served as Battalion S-3 for 2nd Battalion, 504th Parachute Infantry Regiment (PIR); then Brigade S-3 for the 504th PIR before being reassigned as Chief, Theater Operations Branch at US Atlantic Command from 1994 to 1996. He then commanded the 2nd Battalion, 502nd Infantry in the 101st Airborne Division from 1996 to 1998.

=== 1999–2008 ===
Following attendance at the War College, Brigadier General Yarbrough commanded the 173rd Airborne Brigade in Vicenza, Italy, from February 1, 2000 through June 23, 2002. As the XVIII Airborne Corps G3 commencing July 2002, Yarbrough served for 11 months as CJ3 of CJTF-180 executing Operation Enduring Freedom in Afghanistan, and remained the Assistant Chief of Staff/G3, XVIII Airborne Corps until July 1, 2004. After he left the XVIII Airborne Corps, he served as the Deputy Commanding General, United States Army Infantry Center, Fort Benning, Georgia, from July 2004 through July 2006. On 1 August 2006 he became the Assistant Division Commander (Operations), 1st Infantry Division, Fort Riley, Kansas. In July 2007, Yarbrough deployed on Operation Iraqi Freedom where he assumed command of the Iraq Assistance Group from Brigadier General Dana J.H. Pittard, while still serving as the Assistant Division Commander for Maneuver of the 1st Infantry Division. In July 2008, he assumed command of the Joint Readiness Training Center and Fort Polk.

=== Retirement ===
Yarbrough retired from the United States Army in January 2011.

== Decorations and awards ==
Yarbrough's personal and unit awards and decorations include the Defense Superior Service Medal, Legion of Merit (2 oak leaf clusters), Defense Meritorious Service Medal, Meritorious Service Medal (1 silver oak leaf cluster), Joint Service Commendation Medal, Army Commendation Medal (4 oak leaf clusters), Joint Service Achievement Medal, National Defense Service Medal, Armed Forces Expeditionary Medal, Southwest Asia Service Medal, Overseas Service Ribbon, Joint Meritorious Unit Award (1 Oak Leaf Cluster), Valorous Unit Award, Combat Infantryman Badge, Expert Infantryman Badge, Military Freefall Parachutist Badge, Master Parachutist Badge, Air Assault Badge, Pathfinder Badge, Ranger Tab.

Military offices
Preceded by Brigadier General Dana J.H. Pittard	Iraq Assistance Group; 2008–2009	Succeeded by Brigadier General Keith C. Walker
