= Military transition team =

Soldier team

A military transition team or transition team, commonly abbreviated as MiTT, in the context of the United States Military, is a 10–15-soldier team that trains foreign national and local security forces. The term has been used in the "war on terror" to designate groups training the Iraqi Security Forces in particular. By comparison, Afghan Army and other Afghan security forces are mentored and trained by US Embedded Training Teams (ETTs) and the Operational Mentoring and Liaison Teams (OMLTs) of other nations.

== Mission ==
The primary mission of transition teams is to train, mentor, and advise their foreign counterparts in the security forces of Iraq in the areas of intelligence, communications, fire support, logistics, operations and infantry tactics. Specialist teams also train, mentor and advise on civil policing and border enforcement. The goal is to make the local security forces capable of conducting their mission and operations effectively and independent of foreign intervention or advice. Areas covered by transition teams include military and counterinsurgency operations (tactics, logistics), civil policing and border enforcement. When executing military operations with their Iraqi counterparts, transition teams call for U.S. close air support, indirect fire, and medical evacuation, whenever necessary. They also perform the critical role of liaising between the foreign unit and nearby U.S. units to ensure that each unit is aware of and can assist the other in their operations. Transition teams also monitor and report on the capabilities of their assigned unit of the foreign security force. They work with their Iraqi counterparts to enhance the understanding of the rule of law and fundamental human rights.

During Operation Iraqi Freedom, the transition teams were a central part of the strategy to train and equip Iraqi national security forces. One of the primary missions of the U.S. military in Iraq was the training of competent Iraqi security forces. By the end of 2006, transition teams assisted in the training and equipping of approximately 326,000 Iraqi security services personnel. That figure includes 138,000 members of the Iraqi Army and 188,000 Iraqi police and national police forces.

== Types in Iraq (2003–2011) ==
=== Military Transition Teams, MiTTs ===
Most transition teams are known as Military Transition Teams, commonly abbreviated as MiTTs. These teams are responsible for training, mentoring, and advising the Iraqi Army (IA).

=== National Police Transition Teams, NPTTs ===
In 2005, in order to provide similar mentorship to Iraq's other security forces, the Multinational Corps-Iraq (MNC-I) began to embed transition teams with the Ministry of the Interior's paramilitary Iraqi National Police (NP) and regular Iraqi Police Service (IPS). Formerly known as Special Police Training Teams, SPTTs, these national police teams, called National Police Transition Teams, NPTTs, are nearly identical to those supporting the Iraqi Army and consist of 10-12 American Soldiers on each team that is tasked to train an entire Iraqi National Police Battalion.

=== Police Transition Teams, PTTs ===
Police Transition Teams, PTTs provide a similar function for the Iraqi Police. These teams vary greatly in size based on area of responsibility and level of threat. They may include military police units and contracted civilian personnel. The Team leader is normally a Staff Sergeant teamed with enablers. The Enablers are usually one interpreter, and an IPA (usually a civilian police officer). The prerequisite for the IPA is 5 years of sworn state service, and the interpreter is usually a local national. These teams travel to the local police stations working with the Station Commanders. These teams assist with logistics, training, and maintaining supplies on hand. The Team leader acts as both an Advisor, and a Liaison. The Team leader does not run the station he simply provides advice.

=== Border Transition Teams, BTTs ===
BTTs are transition teams embedded (FOB Caldwell, COP Shocker) with the Iraqi Ministry of the Interior's Directorate of Border Enforcement (DBE) forces at the brigade and battalion levels. These teams assist the DBE in patrolling and controlling illicit border crossings on Iraq's international borders. Specifically, these teams focus on assisting the DBE in preventing the infiltration of insurgent, terrorist, and criminal elements into Iraq. Because of the relative remoteness of these assignments, BTTs traditionally include maintenance and communications personnel not found on other TTs. BTTs were often deployed with civilian subject matter experts and advisors attached.

=== Port of Entry Transition Teams, PoETTs ===
PoETTs are transition teams embedded (COP Shocker) with the Iraqi Ministry of the Interior's Port of Entry Directorate (POED) forces at the major ports of entry around the borders of Iraq. These teams assist the Iraqi POED and customs officers in controlling the illegal importation, shipping and smuggling of humans and goods through Iraq's international ports of entry. These teams focus on assisting the Iraqi POED and customs officers in preventing the infiltration of insurgent, terrorist, and criminal elements into Iraq. Similar to the BTTs, PoETTs are often deployed with a civilian subject matter expert or advisor as well as maintenance and communications personnel due to the remoteness of these assignments.

=== Other TTs ===
The U.S. military also embeds a small number of specialty transition teams in low-density administrative, logistics, base security, and transportation units.

== Transition Team Structure ==
=== Iraq Transition Team Structure ===
Transition team soldiers are generally mid- to senior level officer and non-commissioned officers, with the ranks from Sergeant to Colonel. This ensures that the team is sufficient experienced tactically to properly mentor and train their foreign counterparts. Teams are formed from all components and branches of the U.S. military, including the Active Army, Army Reserve, Army National Guard, U.S. Marine Corps, U.S. Navy, and U.S. Air Force. The usual size of most Iraqi TTs is 10-16 soldiers. However, the number of members in a team can range from as few as three to as many as 45. Many teams are supplemented in theater with security or other support. Each team is also provided with 1-6 local interpreters to assist in communicating with their Iraqi counterparts. Although the overwhelming majority of transition teams are provided by the U.S. military, Coalition partners in Iraq have fielded teams in support of the U.S. effort to train the ISF.

Once in Iraq, transition teams are assigned administratively to the Iraq Assistance Group (IAG); however, once embedded with their unit in Iraq, U.S. transition teams fall under the operational control of the local U.S. ground forces commander.

== Transition Team Training (Iraq) ==
Since October 2006, the U.S. Army's 1st Infantry Division, based at Fort Riley, Kansas, is responsible for training all transition teams for service in Iraq and Afghanistan. Previously, transition teams had been trained at several U.S. Army installations, most notably Fort Carson, Colorado; Camp Atterbury, Indiana; Fort Hood, Texas; and Camp Shelby, Mississippi. However, in early 2006, the U.S. Army decided to consolidate all training at Fort Riley in order to standardize and improve training for that critical mission.

In August 2009, the 162nd Infantry Brigade, based at Fort Polk, Louisiana, will be responsible for providing tough, realistic, combined arms and services joint training for Foreign Security Forces-Transition Teams in a mid-to high-intensity environment. Teams will participate in a 60-day rotation for United States Army Personnel with classes operating on a six-day-a-week schedule. United States Air Force and United States Navy teams will endure a 45-day rotation with a six-day-a-week schedule.

The first teams began training in Fort Carson Colorado, September, 2005. The 1st Brigade, 1st Infantry Division took over command and control of the TT mission in October 2006. The brigade is responsible for the formation and training of the TT teams. This training operation is centered on Fort Riley's Camp Funston, where thousands of U.S. soldiers once trained before shipping off to World War I. The Marine Corps trains their teams in Twentynine Palms, California.

The United States Marine Corps approach toward training consists of 2 components. The first is conducted a home station locations at either Camp Pendleton, California, or Camp LeJeune, North Carolina. The second component is 3–6 weeks at 29 Palms Marine Corps Base, California, referred to as Enhanced Mojave Viper (EMV). While at EMV, Marines conduct scenario, immersion, and tactical training in their final phase to training before deployment to Iraq or Afghanistan.

== The future of transition teams ==
As of December 2006, more than 5000 U.S. military personnel were assigned to transition teams in Iraq. This number, however, is expected to increase as MNC-I expands the size of the Iraqi Security Forces. In its 2006 report, the Iraq Study Group (ISG) recommended the following:

... United States should significantly increase the number of U.S. military personnel, including combat troops, embedded in and supporting Iraqi Army units. As these actions proceed, we could begin to move combat forces out of Iraq. The primary mission of U.S. forces in Iraq should evolve to one of supporting the Iraqi army, which would take over primary responsibility for combat operations.

— Iraq Study Group Report, 2006, pg 48

Furthermore, the ISG also concluded that

the number of embedded personnel ... should be large enough to accelerate the development of a real combat capability in Iraqi Army units. Such a mission could involve 10,000 to 20,000 American troops instead of the 3,000 to 4,000 now in this role.

— Iraq Study Group Report, 2006, pg 49

In general, the U.S. military reports that it has been satisfied with the results of the transition team strategy in the Iraq War. It is believed that if the U.S. Military can transition from fighting the insurgents to advising national security forces, U.S. casualty rates may come down. The handover of battlespace to Iraqi Security Forces is an often cited benchmark of progress in the Iraq war. In the National Strategy for Victory in Iraq, victory is defined as "An Iraq that is in the lead defeating terrorists and insurgents and is providing its own security."
