= Iraq Assistance Group =

- Active: 2005–2009
- Country: United States
- Branch: Joint Command
- Size: ~150
- Part of: Multi-National Corps – Iraq
- Headquarters: Camp Victory, Baghdad
- Engagements: Iraq War
- Decorations: Joint Meritorious Unit Award

The Iraq Assistance Group (IAG) was a joint service U.S. military command responsible to Multi-National Corps Iraq. It coordinated military transition teams assisting the reborn Iraqi Army, the Federal Police, the Department of Border Enforcement, Ports of Entry Directorate and the provincial police. These teams provided partnership, mentoring and training to assist their Iraqi partners in achieving full operational effectiveness and facilitating the transition of internal security to Iraqi control. The Iraq Assistance Group itself was a joint command formed from the U.S. Army's 1st Infantry Division and composed of mostly Army soldiers but also including a sizable contingent of sailors, airmen and marines as well as members of foreign militaries.

The setup and mission of the Iraq Assistance Group was similar to the Military Assistance Advisory Groups that sent American military advisors to train, advise and mentor members of foreign militaries in South Vietnam, such as the Army of the Republic of Vietnam, Republic of Vietnam Marine Corps, Republic of Vietnam Navy and the Republic of Vietnam Air Force.

== Training ==
In July 2006, General Dana J.H. Pittard deployed to Iraq where he assumed command of the Iraq Assistance Group, while still serving as the assistant division commander for maneuver (ADC-M) of the 1st Infantry Division. He was the commander of the Iraq Assistance Group in combat in Iraq from June 2006 through 30 June 2007, and then transferred command to Brigadier General Yarbrough. Yarbrough also remained serving as the ADC-M for the 1st Infantry Division while commanding the IAG.

At some point, all Army Military Transition Teams (MiTTs), received training at Fort Riley, Kansas and Camp Buehring, Kuwait. Marine Corps MiTTs receive training both at the Marine Corps Air Ground Combat Center Twentynine Palms, CA and the Advisor Training Group on Camp Pendleton, CA.

Both the Army and Marine Corps teams then conducted their final in-theater training at what was formerly the Phoenix Academy located in Taji, Iraq. The Phoenix Academy's mission was to give final additional training to the Military transition teams (MiTTs) before they were assigned to advise the Iraqi Armed Forces, Police or Border units. Classes that were taught included counterinsurgency (COIN), rules of engagement, cultural awareness and the history of Iraq.

As of early 2009 the Phoenix Academy has merged with the former COIN CFE (Counter Insurgency Center for Excellence) to become COINSOC (Counter Insurgency Stability Operations Center).

=== Dissolution ===
As the security situation in Iraq improved along with the capabilities of the Iraqi Security Forces, the primary focus of coalition forces shifted from combat operations to partnership and mentoring. As a result, it was decided to merge the Iraq Assistance Group back into its parent command. On 3 June 2009, the Iraq Assistance Group cased its colors and its functions and personnel were merged into Multi-National Corps-Iraq.

== Commanding Generals ==
- Major General John P. McLaren, former 80th Division (Institutional Training), United States Army Reserve, – Commander 2005 to 2006
- Brigadier General Dana Pittard, 1st Infantry Division, – Commander June 2006 to 30 June 2007
- Brigadier General James C. Yarbrough, 1st Infantry Division, – Commander 30 June 2007 to July 2008.
- Brigadier General Keith C. Walker – Commander July 2008 to June 2009, when unit conducted the casing of colors.

== See also ==
- Military advisor
- Combat Outpost Shocker
