= Combat Outpost Shocker =

US Coalition base in iraq

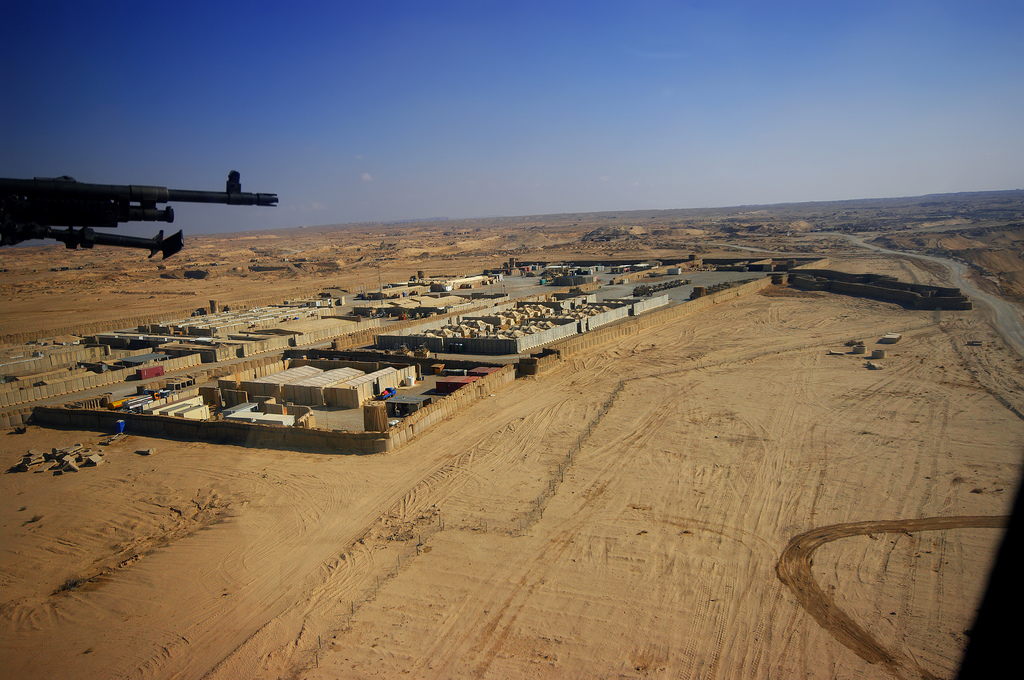
Aerial view of Combat Outpost Shocker in Iraq

Combat Outpost Shocker (COP Shocker) was a United States Coalition base in Zurbatiyah, a city in southern Iraq that is located a few miles from Iran near the Zagros Mountain range The base was located parallel to Iraqi 3rd Region BDE Department of Border Enforcement (DBE). Assigned to the base were a contingent of Iraq Assistance Group Military transition teams, United States Border Patrol and U.S. Canine unit. An element of U.S. soldiers assigned to the 41st Fires Brigade, out of Fort Hood, Texas, conducted operations there during OIF 08-09.The brigade headquarters conducted operations out of FOB Delta - located in Al Kut, Iraq. In 2010, Grim Troop of the 3rd Armored Cavalry Regiment took over until late summer of 2011 during Operation New Dawn.

== Rocket attack ==
On 29 June 2011, Iranian-backed Kata'ib Hezbollah, also known as the Hezbollah Brigades fired IRAM rockets that struck COP Shocker.(Video of the attack) The attack resulted in the deaths of three Army soldiers, Captain Matthew G. Nielson, Captain David E. Van Camp and Sergeant Robert G. Tenney Jr.

== Transfer of base ==
On 30 July 2011, the United States military turned over responsibility of COP Shocker to the Iraqi 3rd Region BDE Department of Border Enforcement (DBE).
