= Ali al-Haidari =

Governor of Baghdad (died 2005)

Governor of Baghdad Governorate
- In office September 2004 – January 4, 2005
- Succeeded by: Abdul Muttalib al-Ilwi

Ali al-Haidari (Arabic: علي الحيدري,, romanized: Alī al-Ḥaidarī; died January 4, 2005) was an Iraqi politician who served as the governor of Baghdad Governorate from the summer of 2004 until his assassination on January 4, 2005.

== Assasination ==
Al-Haidari narrowly escaped an assassination attempt in early September 2004 in Baghdad, however he was assassinated by gunmen in a second attempt in Baghdad on January 4, 2005. A group led by Abu Musab al-Zarqawi claimed responsibility; six suspects were later arrested in November 2005.
