= Operation Iron Hammer (Iraq 2005) =

US/Iraqi military operation

- Part of the Iraq War
Date	30 November – 3 January 2006
Location	East of Hīt, Iraq

Belligerents
United States; Iraq	Iraqi insurgency

Strength
2,000 American troops 500 Iraqi troops	Unknown

Casualties and losses
None	Unknown

Operation Iron Hammer, also called Operation Matraqa Hadidia, was a military undertaking by the United States Armed Forces, and the New Iraqi Army, which was conducted east of Hīt, Iraq, from 30 November, to 3 January 2006, during the Iraq War, against the Iraqi insurgency. It was reported that both the New Iraqi Army, and the United States Armed Forces, sustained no losses during the operation. No civilian casualties were reported either. The operation is believed to have benefited villages on the eastern side of the Euphrates River with an increase in security and stability.

== Background ==
In March 2003, a United States-led coalition invaded Iraq. Within several months afterwards, an insurgency had developed within the country, aimed against the coalition. The Hai Al Becker region, the area where Operation Iron Hammer was focused, was suspected before the operation began to be a 'safe area' for Al-Qaeda in Iraq, a Sunni insurgency group, as well as a base of operations for the construction of vehicles and roadside bombs for the organization. Car bombs were also manufactured. The region was also believed to have been a stopping point for members of the Iraqi insurgency as they traveled down the Euphrates River from Syria into the interior of Iraq. In July 2005, American and New Iraqi Army soldiers reportedly established a long-term security presence in Hīt, located near the region. Before the operation, the region was not usually patrolled by the United States Armed Forces or the New Iraqi Army.

== Prelude ==
The aim of Operation Iron Hammer was to remove Al-Qaeda in Iraq from the region, and establish a secure environment for a legislative election scheduled to occur in December 2005. 500 New Iraqi Army soldiers from 2nd Brigade, 7th Iraqi Army Division; 500 American soldiers from 2nd Battalion-114th Field Artillery Regiment, and 1,500 American Marines and sailors from the 13th Marine Expeditionary Unit participated in the campaign.

== Operation ==
The operation started on 30 November 2005. During the campaign, Iraqi and American soldiers used specialized explosive charges to clear paths through routes in which roadside bombs were believed to have been heavily planted. Some secondary explosions caused by hidden mines or bombs were observed, and one anti-personnel mine was found. An Iraqi commander from 2nd Brigade, 7th Iraqi Army Division and a local sheikh spoke to a group of citizens, explaining the purpose of the operation, and addressed the citizens' concerns. Air strikes, and lethal force, were not used during the military undertaking. The operation was concluded on 3 January 2006.

== Aftermath ==
No civilian, New Iraqi Army, or United States Armed Forces casualties were reported, nor were basic services, such as water and utilities, disrupted. The operation reportedly increased security and stability in villages on the eastern side of the Euphrates River. The legislative election was held on 15 December 2005.
