= John P. McLaren =

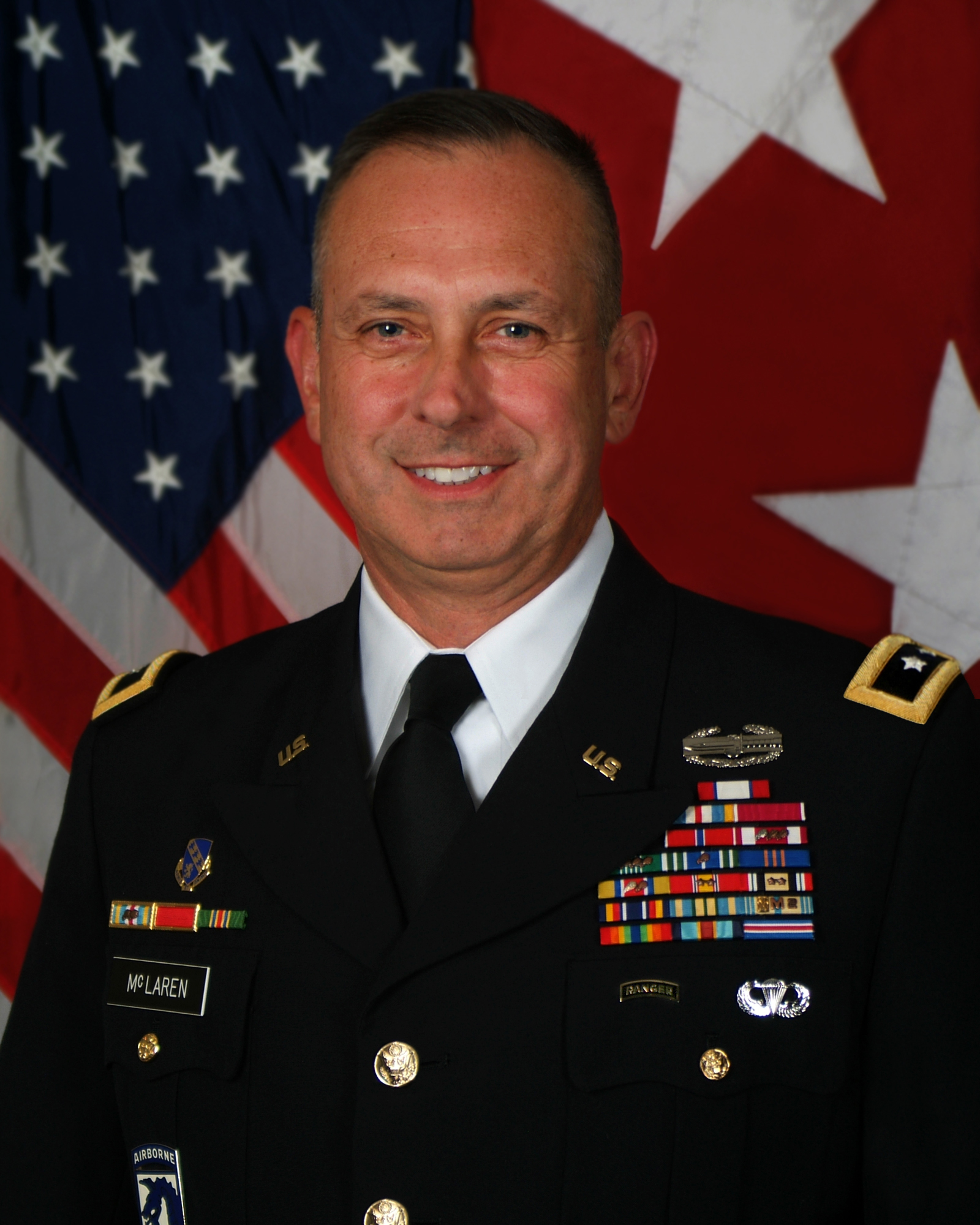
- Major General McLaren as the commanding general 80th Training Command
- Born: Savannah, Georgia
- Military career
- Allegiance: United States
- Branch: United States Army Reserve
- Service years: 1974–2011
- Rank: Major General
- Commands: 80th Training Command; Iraq Assistance Group
- Conflicts: Iraq War
- Awards: Army Distinguished Service Medal; Defense Superior Service Medal; Legion of Merit; Bronze Star Medal

John P. McLaren Jr. is a retired United States Army major general.

== Early life and education ==
Born in Savannah, Georgia, and raised in an Air Force family, McLaren entered the United States Army in 1974 and, after receiving his Regular Army commission as a second lieutenant in the Corps of Engineers, he served at Fort Meade, Maryland, until leaving active duty in May 1978.

McLaren graduated from the Engineer Officer Basic and Advanced Courses, the Infantry Advanced Course, the Command and General Staff College, and the Army War College. He has a bachelor's degree in civil engineering from the Virginia Military Institute and a master's degree in strategic studies from the Army War College. He is a registered professional engineer in the Commonwealth of Virginia.

== Military career ==
McLaren held numerous command positions at various levels both on active duty and in the United States Army Reserve. He was the commander of the Iraq Assistance Group within Multinational Corps – Iraq. As the commander of the group, he directed the military transition teams assigned to Iraqi army units at the battalion, brigade and division level-coaching, mentoring, and partnering with them in fighting the Counter Insurgency Battle in Iraq. During this mission, then Brigadier General McLaren was the senior representative of the largest mobilization call up of 80th Division Soldiers since World War II. Prior to his deployment to Iraq, McLaren served as the Assistant Division Commander – Operations for the 80th Division (Institutional Training) as well as numerous brigade and battalion level command and staff positions within the division.

McLaren served as the Commanding General of the 80th Training Command from May 17, 2008, to August 29, 2011. Prior to this assignment he worked as the Vice Commander of the Joint War Fighting Center and Deputy Joint Force Trainer at U.S. Joint Forces Command in Suffolk, Virginia. As Deputy Joint Force Trainer he helped lead the USJFCOM joint force training effort to conduct and support the development of capabilities that train the individual services to fight together as a team. He also served as the Deputy Commander of Second Fleet for Joint Task Force Operations.

== Civilian life ==
McLaren retired as a Supervisory Civil Engineer from the United States Navy after more than thirty-three years of federal service. He currently works for a construction company in Newport News Virginia where he is the Director of Business Development and Construction Operations. He is married and lives in Virginia Beach, Virginia with his family.

== Awards ==
McLaren's awards and decorations include the Army Distinguished Service Medal, the Defense Superior Service Medal, Legion of Merit, the Bronze Star Medal, the Meritorious Service Medal with one silver and one bronze oak leaf cluster, the Army Commendation Medal with four oak leaf clusters, the Army Achievement Medal with one oak leaf cluster, the Combat Action Badge, the Expert Infantryman Badge, the Ranger Tab and the Parachutist Badge.
