= National Strategy for Victory in Iraq =

Document by the US National Security Council

The National Strategy for Victory in Iraq is a document by the United States National Security Council which articulated the strategy of the United States President, in 2003, and provided an update on progress in various challenges and conflicts, notably Iraq.

On February 26, 2003, President George W. Bush stated,

The United States has no intention of determining the precise form of Iraq's new government. That choice belongs to the Iraqi people. Yet, we will ensure that one brutal dictator is not replaced by another. All Iraqis must have a voice in the new government, and all citizens must have their rights protected. Rebuilding Iraq will require a sustained commitment from many nations, including our own: we will remain in Iraq as long as necessary, and not a day more.

(italics in original)

== Stages ==
Short term

Iraq needs to

- progress in fighting terrorists
- meet political milestones
- build democratic institutions
- foster the growing security forces.

Medium term

Iraq is in the lead

- defeating terrorists
- providing its own security
- fostering the constitutional government
- beginning economic development

Longer term

Iraq should strive for being

- peaceful
- united
- stable
- secure
- integrated into the international community
- a full partner in the global war on terrorism.

== See also ==
- Reconstruction of Iraq
