= 2022–23 Al-Shorta SC season =

Al-Shorta
2022–23 season
- President: (Iraq) Abdul-Halim Fahem
- Head coach: (Egypt) Moamen Soliman (until 19 March) (Iraq) Ahmed Salah (from 19 March onwards)
- Ground: Al-Shaab Stadium
- Iraqi Premier League: 1st
- Iraq FA Cup: Round of 16
- Iraqi Super Cup: Winners
- Arab Club Champions Cup: Semi-finals
- Top goalscorer: League: Alaa Abdul-Zahra (12); All: Alaa Abdul-Zahra, Ahmed Farhan (13 each)
Home colours	Away colours	Arab home colours

The 2022–23 season was Al-Shorta's 49th season in the Iraqi Premier League, having featured in all 48 previous editions of the competition. Al-Shorta participated in the Iraqi Premier League as defending champions, as well as the Iraq FA Cup, the Iraqi Super Cup and the Arab Club Champions Cup.

Al-Shorta began the season by winning the Iraqi Super Cup, beating Al-Karkh 1–0. After a slow start to their league campaign, winning just three games from their first nine, Al-Shorta picked up their form but dismissed manager Moamen Soliman in March after a Baghdad Derby defeat to Al-Zawraa. Soliman's assistant Ahmed Salah took charge of the team for the remainder of the season and managed to steer the club to their second consecutive league title after overtaking Al-Quwa Al-Jawiya at the top of the table, clinching the title with a 3–0 win away to Naft Maysan in the penultimate round of the season.

In the Iraq FA Cup, Al-Shorta reached the round of 16 but were eliminated by Al-Quwa Al-Jawiya 7–6 on penalties after a 1–1 draw. At the end of the season, Al-Shorta participated in the Arab Club Champions Cup and exceeded expectations by reaching the semi-finals of the tournament, defeating Club Sfaxien 1–0 and Al-Sadd 4–2 before losing to Al-Nassr from a penalty scored by Cristiano Ronaldo.

== Player statistics ==
Numbers in parentheses denote appearances as substitute.

No.	Pos.	Nat.	Name	Premier League		FA Cup		Arab Champions Cup		Super Cup		Total	
No.	Pos.	Nat.	Name	Apps	Goals	Apps	Goals	Apps	Goals	Apps	Goals	Apps	Goals
1	GK	IRQ	Ahmed Basil	36	0	1	0	5	0	1	0	43	0
4	DF	IRQ	Munaf Younis	29(2)	2	1	0	5	0	0(1)	0	35(3)	2
6	MF	IRQ	Sajjad Jassim	8(9)	0	1	0	0(2)	0	0(1)	0	9(12)	0
7	FW	SYR	Mahmoud Al-Mawas	26(6)	10	0(1)	1	3(1)	0	1	0	30(8)	11
8	MF	IRQ	Ammar Ghalib	1(13)	2	0(1)	0	0	0	0	0	1(14)	2
10	FW	IRQ	Alaa Abdul-Zahra (captain)	19(8)	12	0(1)	0	4(1)	1	0	0	23(10)	13
11	MF	IRQ	Bassam Shakir	18(11)	2	2	0	0(2)	0	0	0	20(13)	2
12	GK	IRQ	Yassin Karim	2	0	0	0	0	0	0	0	2	0
13	MF	IRQ	Ali Husni	3(10)	0	1	2	0	0	1	0	5(10)	2
14	MF	NIG	Abdoul Madjid Moumouni	27	1	2	1	5	1	1	1	35	4
15	DF	IRQ	Ahmed Yahya	15(7)	0	2	0	5	0	1	0	23(7)	0
17	FW	IRQ	Ahmed Farhan	27(6)	11	1	1	5	1	0	0	33(6)	13
19	DF	JOR	Ihsan Haddad	9(1)	0	0(1)	0	0	0	0	0	9(2)	0
20	MF	SEN	Idrissa Niang	35	5	2	0	5	0	1	0	43	5
22	GK	IRQ	Mohammed Karim	0	0	1	0	0	0	0	0	1	0
23	DF	IRQ	Waleed Salem (vice-captain)	0(1)	0	0	0	0	0	0	0	0(1)	0
24	DF	IRQ	Faisal Jassim	32	0	1	0	5	0	1	0	39	0
25	MF	IRQ	Abdul-Razzaq Qasim	8(7)	1	0	0	0(2)	0	0(1)	0	8(10)	1
26	FW	IRQ	Dhulfiqar Younis	1(2)	0	0	0	0	0	0	0	1(2)	0
27	DF	IRQ	Ameer Sabah	23(6)	1	1	0	3(2)	1	0	0	27(8)	2
28	FW	BRA	Lucas Santos	0	0	0	0	0(3)	0	0	0	0(3)	0
29	FW	IRQ	Mohammed Dawood	15(19)	3	1(1)	0	0	0	1	0	17(20)	3
30	MF	SYR	Fahd Al-Youssef	36(1)	3	1	0	3(1)	0	1	0	41(2)	3
31	DF	IRQ	Ahmed Zero	8(7)	0	1	0	0	0	1	0	10(7)	0
32	GK	IRQ	Abbas Karim	0	0	0	0	0	0	0	0	0	0
34	DF	IRQ	Mustafa Maan	8(1)	0	0(1)	0	0	0	0	0	8(2)	0
36	FW	IRQ	Abbas Mohammed	0	0	0	0	0	0	0	0	0	0
44	DF	IRQ	Mustafa Nadhim	4(2)	0	1	0	0	0	0	0	5(2)	0
61	MF	YEM	Nasser Mohammedoh	6(7)	1	0(1)	0	0(2)	0	0	0	6(10)	1
99	FW	IRQ	Aso Rostam (Note: Aso Rostam wore the number 9 shirt for the 2023 Arab Club Champions Cup.)	11(9)	7	2	0	2(3)	2	0	0	15(12)	9
Players out on loan until end of league season
3	DF	IRQ	Karrar Amer	3(2)	0	0	0	5	0	1	0	9(2)	0
16	MF	IRQ	Mohammed Mezher	3(7)	0	0	0	0(1)	0	0(1)	0	3(9)	0
	DF	IRQ	Bilal Khudhair	0	0	0	0	0	0	0	0	0	0
	MF	IRQ	Atheer Salih	0	0	0	0	0	0	0	0	0	0
Players departed but featured this season
9	FW	SYR	Mardik Mardikian	3(6)	1	0	0	0	0	0(1)	0	3(7)	1
21	MF	IRQ	Mohammed Jaffal	2(8)	1	0	0	0	0	0	0	2(8)	1
33	MF	IRQ	Amjad Waleed	0	0	0	0	0	0	0	0	0	0

== Personnel ==
=== Technical staff ===
Position	Name	Nationality
Head coach:	Ahmed Salah	(Iraq)
Assistant coach:	Hussein Abdul-Wahed	(Iraq)
Fitness coach:	Mazin Abdul-Sattar	(Iraq)
Goalkeeping coach:	Amrou Abdul-Salam	(Egypt)
Technical analyst:	Amrou Fathi	(Egypt)
Physiotherapist:	Tonello Marilia	(Brazil)
Team manager:	Hashim Ridha	(Iraq)

=== Management ===
Position	Name	Nationality
President:	Abdul-Halim Fahem	(Iraq)
Vice-president:	Ghalib Al-Zamili	(Iraq)
Board secretary:	Uday Al-Rubaie	(Iraq)
Financial secretary	Ghazi Faisal	(Iraq)
Member of the Board:	Sadeq Faraj	(Iraq)
Member of the Board:	Abdul-Wahab Al-Taei	(Iraq)
Member of the Board:	Ali Al-Shahmani	(Iraq)
Member of the Board:	Alaa Bahr Al-Uloom	(Iraq)
Member of the Board:	Tahseen Al-Yassri	(Iraq)

== Kit ==
Supplier: Qitharah (club's own brand)

Home	Home (Arab)	Home (Super Cup)	Away	Away (Arab)

== Transfers ==
=== In ===
Date	Pos.	Name	From	Fee
July 2022	MF	(Senegal) Idrissa Niang	(Iraq) Al-Talaba	-
July 2022	MF	(Iraq) Sajjad Jassim	(Iraq) Naft Al-Wasat	-
July 2022	DF	(Iraq) Munaf Younis	(Iraq) Al-Karkh	-
July 2022	GK	(Iraq) Mohammed Karim	(Iraq) Al-Quwa Al-Jawiya	-
July 2022	MF	(Iraq) Amjad Waleed	(Iraq) Zakho	-
July 2022	FW	(Iraq) Ahmed Farhan	(Iraq) Naft Al-Basra	-
August 2022	FW	(Syria) Mardik Mardikian	(Kuwait) Al-Fahaheel	-
August 2022	DF	(Iraq) Ahmed Yahya	(Iraq) Al-Minaa	-
January 2023	DF	(Jordan) Ihsan Haddad	(Jordan) Al-Faisaly	-
February 2023	FW	(Iraq) Aso Rostam	(Kuwait) Al-Salmiya	-
February 2023	DF	(Iraq) Mustafa Nadhim	(Jordan) Al-Faisaly	Loan
February 2023	MF	(Yemen) Nasser Mohammedoh	(Iraq) Naft Al-Wasat	-
July 2023	DF	(Iraq) Karrar Amer	(Iraq) Al-Najaf	End of loan
July 2023	FW	(Iraq) Mohammed Mezher	(Iraq) Al-Najaf	End of loan
July 2023	FW	(Brazil) Lucas Santos	(Iraq) Naft Al-Wasat	-

=== Out ===
Date	Pos.	Name	To	Fee
July 2022	MF	(Iraq) Mohammed Qasim Majid	(Iraq) Al-Quwa Al-Jawiya	-
July 2022	DF	(Iraq) Niaz Mohammed	(Iraq) Erbil	-
July 2022	DF	(Iraq) Hassan Ashour	(Iraq) Al-Zawraa	-
July 2022	DF	(Iraq) Ali Yousif	(Iraq) Al-Zawraa	-
July 2022	DF	(Iraq) Saad Natiq	(Saudi Arabia) Al-Batin	-
July 2022	DF	(Iraq) Khudhor Ali	(Iraq) Al-Talaba	-
July 2022	MF	(Iraq) Ali Mahdi	(Iraq) Al-Talaba	-
July 2022	DF	(Iraq) Bilal Khudhair	(Iraq) Al-Hudood	Loan
August 2022	MF	(Iraq) Sadeq Zamel	(Iraq) Naft Al-Basra	-
August 2022	GK	(Iraq) Mohammed Abbas	(Iraq) Al-Naft	-
August 2022	MF	(Iraq) Atheer Salih	(Iraq) Al-Naft	Loan
August 2022	MF	(Iraq) Hussein Younis	(Iraq) Al-Talaba	-
August 2022	FW	(Iraq) Mohammed Qasim Nassif	(Iraq) Karbala	-
December 2022	FW	(Syria) Mardik Mardikian	(United Arab Emirates) Al-Hamriya	-
January 2023	MF	(Iraq) Amjad Waleed	(Iraq) Al-Talaba	-
January 2023	DF	(Iraq) Karrar Amer	(Iraq) Al-Najaf	Loan
January 2023	MF	(Iraq) Mohammed Jaffal	(Iraq) Erbil	-
February 2023	MF	(Iraq) Mohammed Mezher	(Iraq) Al-Najaf	Loan
July 2023	DF	(Iraq) Mustafa Nadhim	(Jordan) Al-Faisaly	End of loan
July 2023	DF	(Jordan) Ihsan Haddad	(Jordan) Al-Faisaly	-

== Competitions ==
=== Iraqi Super Cup ===
2 October 2022 Final	Al-Shorta	1 – 0	Al-Karkh	Baghdad
16:00 GMT	Abdoul Madjid Moumouni 43'		Karrar Saad (yellow card) (yellow-red card) 90+4'	Stadium: Al-Madina Stadium; Referee: Ali Sabah

=== Iraqi Premier League ===
10 October 2022 1	Duhok	1 – 1	Al-Shorta	Duhok
16:30 GMT	Prince Opoku Agyemang 18'		Munaf Younis 88'	Stadium: Duhok Stadium

15 October 2022 2	Al-Shorta	2 – 1	Al-Zawraa	Baghdad
17:00 GMT	Mohammed Dawood 15'; Mahmoud Al-Mawas (penalty missed) 26'; Mardik Mardikian 73'		Faisal Jassim 38' (o.g.); Hassan Houbeib (red card) 53'	Stadium: Al-Shaab Stadium

20 October 2022 3	Al-Shorta	1 – 0	Al-Diwaniya	Baghdad
16:30 GMT	Mahmoud Al-Mawas 24'; Munaf Younis (yellow card) (yellow-red card) 65'		Ali Hamed (red card) 62'	Stadium: Al-Shaab Stadium

24 October 2022 4	Al-Naft	1 – 2	Al-Shorta	Baghdad
14:30 GMT	Sudi Abdallah 6'		Abdul-Razzaq Qasim 21'; Mahmoud Al-Mawas 74'	Stadium: Al-Madina Stadium

29 October 2022 5	Al-Shorta	1 – 1	Naft Al-Wasat	Baghdad
16:30 GMT	Mahmoud Al-Mawas 57' (pen.)		Muntadher Sattar 25'	Stadium: Al-Shaab Stadium

25 November 2022 6	Erbil	1 – 0	Al-Shorta	Erbil
11:30 GMT	Ahmed Sartib (penalty missed) 53'; Ahmed Hassan Maknzi 75' (pen.)			Stadium: Franso Hariri Stadium

30 November 2022 7	Al-Shorta	2 – 2	Al-Talaba	Baghdad
16:00 GMT	Mohammed Jaffal 8'; Alaa Abdul-Zahra 90+1' (pen.)		Ali Faez 39'; Dhurgham Ismail 79' (pen.); Khudhor Ali (red card) 89'	Stadium: Al-Madina Stadium

5 December 2022 8	Al-Quwa Al-Jawiya	1 – 0	Al-Shorta	Baghdad
17:00 GMT	Wilson Akakpo 85'; Hassan Raed (red card) 90+2'			Stadium: Al-Shaab Stadium

10 December 2022 9	Al-Shorta	1 – 1	Naft Al-Basra	Baghdad
15:30 GMT	Fahd Al-Youssef 27'; Sajjad Jassim (red card) 53'		Alaa Raad 68'	Stadium: Al-Shaab Stadium

14 December 2022 10	Al-Karkh	2 – 3	Al-Shorta	Baghdad
11:00 GMT	Suhaib Raad 47'; Nihad Mohammed 77'		Mohammed Dawood 61'; Alaa Abdul-Zahra 62'; Munaf Younis 90+2'	Stadium: Al-Madina Stadium

19 December 2022 11	Al-Shorta	4 – 0	Al-Sinaa	Baghdad
16:30 GMT	Ahmed Farhan 27'; Fahd Al-Youssef 45+2'; Alaa Abdul-Zahra 65'; Ammar Ghalib 72'			Stadium: Al-Shaab Stadium

25 December 2022 12	Al-Shorta	1 – 0	Zakho	Baghdad
15:30 GMT	Alaa Abdul-Zahra 81'			Stadium: Al-Shaab Stadium

28 January 2023 13	Newroz	2 – 2	Al-Shorta	Erbil
11:00 GMT	Cláudio Maradona 12', 76'		Alaa Abdul-Zahra 32'; Ahmed Farhan 71'	Stadium: Franso Hariri Stadium

2 February 2023 14	Al-Shorta	1 – 0	Al-Najaf	Baghdad
14:00 GMT	Alaa Abdul-Zahra 13'			Stadium: Al-Shaab Stadium

7 February 2023 15	Al-Qasim	0 – 2	Al-Shorta	Karbala
13:30 GMT			Mahmoud Al-Mawas 14'; Idrissa Niang 63'	Stadium: Karbala International Stadium

11 February 2023 16	Al-Shorta	3 – 1	Karbala	Baghdad
16:30 GMT	Ahmed Farhan 44', 76'; Nasser Mohammedoh 53'		Sami Hien 45+3'	Stadium: Al-Shaab Stadium

18 February 2023 17	Al-Kahrabaa	1 – 3	Al-Shorta	Baghdad
15:30 GMT	Muhaimen Salim 63'		Idrissa Niang 6'; Aso Rostam 40'; Ahmed Farhan (penalty missed) 54'; Bassam Shakir 79'	Stadium: Al-Zawraa Stadium

23 February 2023 18	Al-Shorta	3 – 0	Naft Maysan	Baghdad
17:30 GMT	Aso Rostam 18', 43', 66'			Stadium: Al-Shaab Stadium

28 February 2023 19	Al-Hudood	2 – 2	Al-Shorta	Baghdad
15:15 GMT	Alexandre Yeoulé 56', 90'		Aso Rostam 22' (pen.); Abdoul Madjid Moumouni (yellow card) (yellow-red card) 50'; Fahd Al-Youssef 81'	Stadium: Al-Shaab Stadium

11 March 2023 20	Al-Shorta	1 – 0	Duhok	Baghdad
16:30 GMT	Ahmed Farhan 19'			Stadium: Al-Shaab Stadium

17 March 2023 21	Al-Zawraa	2 – 1	Al-Shorta	Baghdad
18:00 GMT	Saad Abdul-Amir 54'; Alaa Abbas 62'		Bassam Shakir 10'	Stadium: Al-Shaab Stadium

2 April 2023 22	Al-Diwaniya	0 – 3	Al-Shorta	Najaf
12:30 GMT	Ismail Issaka (yellow card) (yellow-red card) 83'		Ahmed Farhan 6'; Mohammed Dawood 66'; Idrissa Niang 75'	Stadium: Al-Najaf International Stadium

7 April 2023 23	Al-Shorta	1 – 0	Al-Naft	Baghdad
18:30 GMT	Aso Rostam 6'			Stadium: Al-Shaab Stadium

19 April 2023 24	Naft Al-Wasat	1 – 0	Al-Shorta	Najaf
18:45 GMT	Florent Deda 90+4'			Stadium: Al-Najaf International Stadium

25 April 2023 25	Al-Shorta	2 – 1	Erbil	Baghdad
14:30 GMT	Ahmed Farhan 21', 53'		Amjad Radhi 85'	Stadium: Al-Shaab Stadium

30 April 2023 26	Al-Talaba	0 – 3	Al-Shorta	Baghdad
18:30 GMT			Alaa Abdul-Zahra 46', 63' (pen.); Ahmed Farhan 86'	Stadium: Al-Shaab Stadium

5 May 2023 27	Al-Shorta	0 – 0	Al-Quwa Al-Jawiya	Baghdad
18:30 GMT				Stadium: Al-Shaab Stadium

11 May 2023 28	Naft Al-Basra	0 – 2	Al-Shorta	Basra
16:00 GMT			Ahmed Farhan 45+2'; Aso Rostam 84'	Stadium: Al-Fayhaa Stadium

20 May 2023 29	Al-Shorta	0 – 1	Al-Karkh	Baghdad
18:00 GMT	Idrissa Niang (yellow card) 23' (yellow-red card) 36'		Leanderson Lucas 50'	Stadium: Al-Shaab Stadium

25 May 2023 30	Al-Sinaa	0 – 1	Al-Shorta	Baghdad
13:30 GMT			Mahmoud Al-Mawas 42'	Stadium: Al-Sinaa Stadium

30 May 2023 31	Zakho	0 – 1	Al-Shorta	Zakho
16:00 GMT			Alaa Abdul-Zahra 8'	Stadium: Zakho International Stadium

4 June 2023 32	Al-Shorta	1 – 0	Newroz	Baghdad
14:00 GMT	Mahmoud Al-Mawas 13'			Stadium: Al-Shaab Stadium

25 June 2023 33	Al-Najaf	0 – 5	Al-Shorta	Karbala
16:15 GMT			Alaa Abdul-Zahra 19', 55'; Idrissa Niang 27'; Mahmoud Al-Mawas 45+1'; Ammar Ghalib 90+1'	Stadium: Karbala International Stadium

30 June 2023 34	Al-Shorta	1 – 0	Al-Qasim	Baghdad
18:30 GMT	Mahmoud Al-Mawas 74'		Malik Ismaila Antiri (red card) 70'	Stadium: Al-Shaab Stadium

5 July 2023 35	Karbala	1 – 0	Al-Shorta	Karbala
18:30 GMT	Mushtaq Talib 88'			Stadium: Karbala International Stadium

10 July 2023 36	Al-Shorta	2 – 0	Al-Kahrabaa	Baghdad
19:00 GMT	Alaa Abdul-Zahra 14'; Mahmoud Al-Mawas 24'		Ali Khaled (red card) 18'	Stadium: Al-Shaab Stadium

15 July 2023 37	Naft Maysan	0 – 3	Al-Shorta	Amara
16:45 GMT			Ameer Sabah 37'; Idrissa Niang 44'; Abdoul Madjid Moumouni 65'	Stadium: Maysan Olympic Stadium

18 July 2023 38	Al-Shorta	2 – 1	Al-Hudood	Baghdad
17:00 GMT	Mahmoud Al-Mawas 85'; Ahmed Farhan 90+5'		Mouhamed Soueid 50' (pen.)	Stadium: Al-Shaab Stadium
Note: Al-Shorta defender Munaf Younis received a red card in the 81st minute after being substituted off the field.

==== Score overview ====
Win Draw Loss

Opposition	Home score	Away score	Double
Al-Diwaniya	1–0	3–0	Yes
Al-Hudood	2–1	2–2	No
Al-Kahrabaa	2–0	3–1	Yes
Al-Karkh	0–1	3–2	No
Al-Naft	1–0	2–1	Yes
Al-Najaf	1–0	5–0	Yes
Al-Qasim	1–0	2–0	Yes
Al-Quwa Al-Jawiya	0–0	0–1	No
Al-Sinaa	4–0	1–0	Yes
Al-Talaba	2–2	3–0	No
Al-Zawraa	2–1	1–2	No
Duhok	1–0	1–1	No
Erbil	2–1	0–1	No
Karbala	3–1	0–1	No
Naft Al-Basra	1–1	2–0	No
Naft Al-Wasat	1–1	0–1	No
Naft Maysan	3–0	3–0	Yes
Newroz	1–0	2–2	No
Zakho	1–0	1–0	Yes

Note: Al-Shorta goals listed first.

==== Classification ====
Pos	Team	Pld	W	D	L	GF	GA	GD	Pts	Qualification or relegation
1	Al-Shorta (C)	38	25	7	6	63	24	+39	82	
2	Al-Quwa Al-Jawiya	38	23	9	6	62	26	+36	78	Qualification for the AFC Champions League group stage (Note: Al-Shorta were not granted an AFC license, therefore their AFC Champions League spot was passed to the league runners-up and Iraq FA Cup winners Al-Quwa Al-Jawiya.)
3	Al-Zawraa	38	18	14	6	50	32	+18	68	Qualification for the AFC Cup group stage (Note: As Al-Quwa Al-Jawiya (league runners-up and Iraq FA Cup winners) entered the AFC Champions League, the two AFC Cup spots were passed down to Iraq's only other licensed clubs, Al-Zawraa and Al-Kahrabaa.)
4	Al-Talaba	38	19	9	10	52	39	+13	66	
5	Al-Kahrabaa	38	17	11	10	51	38	+13	62	Qualification for the AFC Cup group stage

Source: IPFL
Rules for classification: 1) points; 2) head-to-head points; 3) head-to-head goal difference; 4) goal difference; 5) number of wins; 6) number of goals scored.
(C) Champions

==== Results summary ====
Overall								Home						Away					
Pld	W	D	L	GF	GA	GD	Pts	W	D	L	GF	GA	GD	W	D	L	GF	GA	GD
38	25	7	6	63	24	+39	82	14	4	1	29	9	+20	11	3	5	34	15	+19

Source: Kooora

==== Results by round ====
Round	1	2	3	4	5	6	7	8	9	10	11	12	13	14	15	16	17	18	19	20	21	22	23	24	25	26	27	28	29	30	31	32	33	34	35	36	37	38
Ground	A	H	H	A	H	A	H	A	H	A	H	H	A	H	A	H	A	H	A	H	A	A	H	A	H	A	H	A	H	A	A	H	A	H	A	H	A	H
Result	D	W	W	W	D	L	D	L	D	W	W	W	D	W	W	W	W	W	D	W	L	W	W	L	W	W	D	W	L	W	W	W	W	W	L	W	W	W
Position	9	4	3	2	4	5	8	8	9	8	6	6	6	5	4	3	2	2	2	1	1	2	1	2	2	1	1	1	2	2	1	1	1	1	1	1	1	1

Source: Kooora
A = Away; H = Home; W = Win; D = Draw; L = Loss

=== Iraq FA Cup ===
7 March 2023 Round of 32	Al-Shorta	6 – 3	Masafi Al-Junoob	Baghdad
15:15 GMT	Ali Husni 12', 54'; Alaa Amer 15' (o.g.); Mousa Benyamin 19' (o.g.); Abdoul Madjid Moumouni 39'; Mahmoud Al-Mawas 77'		Ahmed Qasim 24'; Joshua Michael 71' (pen.); Jabr Suroor 79'	Stadium: Al-Shaab Stadium

16 May 2023 Round of 16	Al-Quwa Al-Jawiya	1 – 1 (7 – 6 p)	Al-Shorta	Baghdad
15:15 GMT	Shareef Abdul-Kadhim 14'		Ahmed Farhan 59'	Stadium: Al-Shaab Stadium
	Penalties
	Mohannad Abdul-Raheem (penalty scored); Shareef Abdul-Kadhim (penalty scored); Ali Mohsin (penalty scored); Afriyie Acquah (penalty scored); Ghaith Maaroufi (penalty scored); Ruslan Hanoon (penalty scored); Wilson Akakpo (penalty scored)		(penalty scored) Aso Rostam; (penalty scored) Ihsan Haddad; (penalty scored) Mohammed Dawood; (penalty scored) Idrissa Niang; (penalty scored) Fahd Al-Youssef; (penalty scored) Ahmed Farhan; (penalty missed) Ahmed Yahya

=== Arab Club Champions Cup ===
==== Group stage ====
Pos	Team	Pld	W	D	L	GF	GA	GD	Pts	Qualification
1	(Saudi Arabia) Al-Ittihad Jeddah	3	3	0	0	5	2	+3	9	Quarter-finals
2	(Iraq) Al-Shorta	3	1	1	1	2	2	0	4	Quarter-finals
3	(Tunisia) Espérance de Tunis	3	0	2	1	1	2	−1	2	
4	(Tunisia) CS Sfaxien	3	0	1	2	0	2	−2	1	

Source: UAFA

27 July 2023 1	Club Sfaxien (Tunisia)	0 – 1	(Iraq) Al-Shorta	Taif, Saudi Arabia
15:00 GMT	Ahmed Ajjal (yellow card) (yellow-red card) 62'		Alaa Abdul-Zahra 64' (pen.)	Stadium: King Fahd Sports City; Referee: Majed Al-Shamrani

30 July 2023 2	Al-Shorta (Iraq)	0 – 0	(Tunisia) Espérance de Tunis	Taif, Saudi Arabia
15:00 GMT				Stadium: King Fahd Sports City; Referee: Mohammed Al-Shammari

2 August 2023 3	Al-Shorta (Iraq)	1 – 2	(Saudi Arabia) Al-Ittihad	Taif, Saudi Arabia
15:00 GMT	Abdoul Madjid Moumouni 80'		Ahmed Bamsaud 36'; Karim Benzema 84' (pen.)	Stadium: King Fahd Sports City; Referee: Ammar Al-Jeneibi

==== Knockout phase ====
===== Quarter-finals =====
5 August 2023 3	Al-Sadd (Qatar)	2 – 4	(Iraq) Al-Shorta	Abha, Saudi Arabia
15:00 GMT	Akram Afif 24' (pen.), 81'		Ameer Sabah 32'; Aso Rostam 59' (pen.), 78'; Ahmed Farhan 70'	Stadium: Prince Sultan bin Abdul Aziz Stadium; Referee: Khaled Al Teris

===== Semi-finals =====
9 August 2023 3	Al-Shorta (Iraq)	0 – 1	(Saudi Arabia) Al-Nassr	Abha, Saudi Arabia
15:00 GMT			Cristiano Ronaldo 75' (pen.)	Stadium: Prince Sultan bin Abdul Aziz Stadium; Referee: Adel Al Naqbi

== Top goalscorers ==
=== Iraqi Premier League ===
Position	Nation	Squad Number	Name	Goals	Assists
FW	(Iraq)	10	Alaa Abdul-Zahra	12	2
FW	(Iraq)	17	Ahmed Farhan	11	3
FW	(Syria)	7	Mahmoud Al-Mawas	10	6
FW	(Iraq)	99	Aso Rostam	7	0
MF	(Senegal)	20	Idrissa Niang	5	1
MF	(Syria)	30	Fahd Al-Youssef	3	7
FW	(Iraq)	29	Mohammed Dawood	3	5
MF	(Iraq)	11	Bassam Shakir	2	3
DF	(Iraq)	4	Munaf Younis	2	0
MF	(Iraq)	8	Ammar Ghalib	2	0
DF	(Iraq)	27	Ameer Sabah	1	2
FW	(Syria)	9	Mardik Mardikian	1	1
MF	(Iraq)	21	Mohammed Jaffal	1	1
MF	(Niger)	14	Abdoul Madjid Moumouni	1	0
MF	(Iraq)	25	Abdul-Razzaq Qasim	1	0
MF	(Yemen)	61	Nasser Mohammedoh	1	0
DF	(Iraq)	15	Ahmed Yahya	0	3
MF	(Iraq)	6	Sajjad Jassim	0	2
MF	(Iraq)	13	Ali Husni	0	2
MF	(Iraq)	16	Mohammed Mezher	0	2
DF	(Iraq)	31	Ahmed Zero	0	1
DF	(Iraq)	34	Mustafa Maan	0	1

=== Iraq FA Cup ===
Position	Nation	Squad Number	Name	Goals	Assists
MF	(Iraq)	13	Ali Husni	2	0
MF	(Niger)	14	Abdoul Madjid Moumouni	1	0
FW	(Syria)	7	Mahmoud Al-Mawas	1	0
MF	(Iraq)	17	Ahmed Farhan	1	0
FW	(Iraq)	99	Aso Rostam	0	3
FW	(Iraq)	10	Alaa Abdul-Zahra	0	1

=== Iraqi Super Cup ===
Position	Nation	Squad Number	Name	Goals	Assists
MF	(Niger)	14	Abdoul Madjid Moumouni	1	0
MF	(Iraq)	13	Ali Husni	0	1

=== Arab Club Champions Cup ===
Position	Nation	Squad Number	Name	Goals	Assists
FW	(Iraq)	9	Aso Rostam	2	1
FW	(Iraq)	10	Alaa Abdul-Zahra	1	0
MF	(Niger)	14	Abdoul Madjid Moumouni	1	0
MF	(Iraq)	17	Ahmed Farhan	1	0
DF	(Iraq)	27	Ameer Sabah	1	0
DF	(Iraq)	4	Munaf Younis	0	1
