= 2023–24 Al-Shorta SC season =

Al-Shorta
2023–24 season
- President: Abdul-Halim Fahem
- Head coach: Chiheb Ellili (until 21 February); Hussein Abdul-Wahed (Caretaker) (from 21 February until 1 March); Moamen Soliman (from 1 March onwards)
- Ground: Al-Shaab Stadium
- Iraq Stars League: 1st
- Iraq FA Cup: Winners
- Top goalscorer: League: Mahmoud Al-Mawas (20); All: Mahmoud Al-Mawas (20)
Home colours	Away colours

The 2023–24 season was Al-Shorta's 50th season in the Iraq Stars League, having featured in all 49 previous editions of the competition. Al-Shorta participated in the Iraq Stars League as defending champions, as well as competing in the Iraq FA Cup. Al-Shorta did not participate in the AFC Champions League as they did not obtain an AFC license.

Al-Shorta won the league title for the third consecutive season, led by Moamen Soliman, who returned to the club to take over from Chiheb Ellili midway through the season. Al-Shorta secured the league title in the penultimate round of the season by defeating Duhok 1–0. Al-Shorta also won the Iraq FA Cup title for the first time in their history, beating rivals Al-Quwa Al-Jawiya 1–0 in the final to secure the double for the first time.

== Player statistics ==
Numbers in parentheses denote appearances as substitute.

No.	Pos.	Nat.	Name	Stars League		FA Cup		Total	
No.	Pos.	Nat.	Name	Apps	Goals	Apps	Goals	Apps	Goals
1	GK	IRQ	Ahmed Basil	37	0	4	0	41	0
3	DF	IRQ	Karrar Amer	25(2)	3	2	0	27(2)	3
4	DF	IRQ	Munaf Younis	18(7)	1	2(1)	0	20(8)	1
6	MF	IRQ	Sajjad Jassim	14(18)	3	1(3)	1	15(21)	4
7	FW	SYR	Mahmoud Al-Mawas	36(1)	20	4	0	40(1)	20
8	FW	IRQ	Zidane Abdul-Jabbar	2(10)	2	1(1)	0	3(11)	2
9	MF	IRQ	Hussein Ali	23(7)	4	4	1	27(7)	5
10	FW	IRQ	Alaa Abdul-Zahra (captain)	11(15)	3	2(2)	0	13(17)	3
11	MF	IRQ	Bassam Shakir	22(6)	3	2(2)	0	24(8)	3
12	GK	IRQ	Yassin Karim	1	0	0	0	1	0
13	MF	IRQ	Ali Husni	13(12)	4	0(2)	0	13(14)	4
14	MF	NIG	Abdoul Madjid Moumouni	32(1)	3	2	0	34(1)	3
15	DF	IRQ	Ahmed Yahya	20(4)	0	2	0	22(4)	0
16	MF	IRQ	Mohammed Mezher	0(10)	1	0	0	0(10)	1
17	FW	IRQ	Ahmed Farhan	2(1)	0	0	0	2(1)	0
18	FW	IRQ	Mohanad Ali (vice-captain)	16(14)	16	2	1	18(14)	17
20	MF	SEN	Idrissa Niang	10	5	0	0	10	5
22	GK	IRQ	Mohammed Karim	0(1)	0	0	0	0(1)	0
24	DF	IRQ	Faisal Jassim	24(3)	0	2(1)	0	26(4)	0
25	MF	IRQ	Abdul-Razzaq Qasim	17(13)	2	3(1)	0	20(14)	2
27	DF	IRQ	Ameer Sabah	25(6)	0	3	0	28(6)	0
28	FW	BRA	Lucas Santos	8(9)	2	2(2)	1	10(11)	3
30	MF	SYR	Fahd Al-Youssef	34(1)	0	4	0	38(1)	0
31	DF	IRQ	Ahmed Zero	16(7)	0	0(1)	0	16(8)	0
32	GK	IRQ	Abbas Karim	0	0	0	0	0	0
33	DF	IRQ	Haidar Adel	0	0	0	0	0	0
34	DF	IRQ	Ali Jassim Zayer	0	0	0	0	0	0
36	DF	CMR	Salomon Banga	3(2)	0	2	0	5(2)	0
37	MF	GUI	Ousmane Coumbassa	3(6)	0	0(2)	0	3(8)	0
Players out on loan for rest of the season
29	FW	IRQ	Mohammed Dawood	0(7)	0	0	0	0(7)	0
	MF	IRQ	Ammar Ghalib	0	0	0	0	0	0
	MF	IRQ	Atheer Salih	0	0	0	0	0	0
	FW	IRQ	Aso Rostam	0	0	0	0	0	0
	FW	IRQ	Dhulfiqar Younis	0	0	0	0	0	0
Players departed but featured this season
5	DF	JOR	Yazan Al-Arab	6(1)	0	0	0	6(1)	0

== Personnel ==
=== Technical staff ===
Position	Name	Nationality
Head coach:	Moamen Soliman	(Egypt)
Assistant coach:	Amrou Fathi	(Egypt)
Fitness coach:	Haidar Abdul-Qadir	(Iraq)
Goalkeeping coach:	Amrou Abdul-Salam	(Egypt)
Physiotherapist:	Tonello Marilia	(Brazil)
Team manager:	Hashim Ridha	(Iraq)

=== Management ===
Position	Name	Nationality
President:	Abdul-Halim Fahem	(Iraq)
Vice-president:	Ghalib Al-Zamili	(Iraq)
Board secretary:	Uday Al-Rubaie	(Iraq)
Financial secretary	Ghazi Faisal	(Iraq)
Member of the Board:	Sadeq Faraj	(Iraq)
Member of the Board:	Abdul-Wahab Al-Taei	(Iraq)
Member of the Board:	Ali Al-Shahmani	(Iraq)
Member of the Board:	Alaa Bahar Al-Uloom	(Iraq)
Member of the Board:	Tahseen Al-Yassri	(Iraq)

== Kit ==
Period	Home colours	Away colours
October 2023 – December 2023	Terio	Qitharah (club's own brand)
February 2024 – July 2024	Qitharah (club's own brand)	Qitharah (club's own brand)

== Transfers ==
=== In ===
Date	Pos.	Name	From	Fee
August 2023	MF	(Iraq) Hussein Ali	(Tunisia) CS Sfaxien	-
September 2023	FW	(Iraq) Mohanad Ali	(Qatar) Al-Duhail	-
November 2023	DF	(Jordan) Yazan Al-Arab	(Malaysia) Selangor	-
January 2024	FW	(Iraq) Zidane Abdul-Jabbar	(Iraq) Erbil	-
February 2024	MF	(Guinea) Ousmane Coumbassa	(Tunisia) Olympique Béja	-
February 2024	DF	(Cameroon) Salomon Banga	(Rwanda) APR	-

=== Out ===
Date	Pos.	Name	To	Fee
August 2023	DF	(Iraq) Mustafa Maan	(Iraq) Al-Zawraa	-
August 2023	DF	(Iraq) Waleed Salem		Retired
September 2023	MF	(Yemen) Nasser Mohammedoh	(Bahrain) Al-Muharraq	-
September 2023	FW	(Iraq) Dhulfiqar Younis	(Iraq) Duhok	Loan
September 2023	MF	(Iraq) Ammar Ghalib	(Iraq) Al-Naft	Loan
October 2023	FW	(Iraq) Aso Rostam	(Iraq) Erbil	Loan
October 2023	MF	(Iraq) Atheer Salih	(Iraq) Naft Al-Basra	Loan
January 2024	FW	(Iraq) Mohammed Dawood	(Iraq) Al-Najaf	Loan
February 2024	DF	(Jordan) Yazan Al-Arab	(Qatar) Muaither	-
February 2024	FW	(Iraq) Aso Rostam	(Iran) Esteghlal Khuzestan	Loan

== Competitions ==
=== Iraq Stars League ===
27 October 2023 1	Duhok	2 – 0	Al-Shorta	Duhok
18:30 GMT	Yannick Zakri 12'; Hiran Ahmed 62'; Mohammed Saeed Khalid (red card) 90+5'			Stadium: Duhok Stadium

30 October 2023 2	Al-Shorta	2 – 1	Karbala	Baghdad
18:30 GMT	Mohammed Mezher 85'; Mohanad Ali 90+8'		Ridha Fadhil (yellow card) (yellow-red card) 33'; Mustafa Radhi 61'	Stadium: Al-Zawraa Stadium

3 November 2023 3	Al-Minaa	0 – 3 (w/o)	Al-Shorta	Basra
18:30 GMT			Mohanad Ali 5'	Stadium: Basra International Stadium
Note: The match was awarded as a 3–0 win to Al-Shorta, as Al-Minaa started the game with only 7 players and had their player Mohammed Khudhair go off injured in the eighth minute, bringing an end to the game.

9 November 2023 4	Al-Shorta	2 – 1	Erbil	Baghdad
18:30 GMT	Mohanad Ali 54'; Mahmoud Al-Mawas 60' (pen.); Fahd Al-Youssef (red card) 66'		Zidane Abdul-Jabbar 88'	Stadium: Al-Zawraa Stadium

23 November 2023 5	Al-Quwa Al-Jawiya	2 – 2	Al-Shorta	Kut
11:30 GMT	Mohannad Abdul-Raheem 73'; Ali Jasim 82'		Abdoul Madjid Moumouni 4'; Bassam Shakir 67'	Stadium: Al-Kut Olympic Stadium

2 December 2023 6	Al-Shorta	0 – 1	Al-Naft	Baghdad
14:00 GMT			Sampson Gbadebo 58'	Stadium: Al-Zawraa Stadium

5 December 2023 7	Amanat Baghdad	1 – 2	Al-Shorta	Baghdad
11:30 GMT	Mateus Totô 75'		Mahmoud Al-Mawas 23'; Idrissa Niang 45+2'	Stadium: Amanat Baghdad Stadium

8 December 2023 8	Al-Shorta	2 – 0	Zakho	Najaf
16:00 GMT	Mahmoud Al-Mawas 36' (pen.); Idrissa Niang 61'			Stadium: Al-Najaf International Stadium

15 December 2023 9	Al-Hudood	0 – 4	Al-Shorta	Baghdad
11:30 GMT	Ali Mohsin (red card) 83'		Sajjad Jassim 10'; Idrissa Niang 11', 74'; Yazan Al-Arab (red card) 55'; Abdoul Madjid Moumouni 90+3'	Stadium: Amanat Baghdad Stadium

19 December 2023 10	Al-Shorta	2 – 0	Al-Najaf	Baghdad
18:30 GMT	Idrissa Niang 45'; Mahmoud Al-Mawas (penalty missed) 45+10'; Karrar Amer 47'			Stadium: Al-Zawraa Stadium

22 December 2023 11	Al-Shorta	3 – 0	Naft Al-Wasat	Baghdad
11:30 GMT	Sajjad Jassim 20'; Mahmoud Al-Mawas 36'; Mohanad Ali 90+1'			Stadium: Amanat Baghdad Stadium

30 December 2023 12	Naft Al-Basra	0 – 1	Al-Shorta	Basra
11:30 GMT			Karrar Amer 40'	Stadium: Al-Fayhaa Stadium

11 February 2024 13	Al-Shorta	2 – 2	Al-Zawraa	Baghdad
16:00 GMT	Mahmoud Al-Mawas (penalty missed) 29', 29'; Jalal Hassan 52' (o.g.)		Maitham Jabbar 6'; Christopher John 31'	Stadium: Al-Shaab Stadium

16 February 2024 14	Al-Qasim	2 – 3	Al-Shorta	Karbala
11:00 GMT	Murtadha Kassad (penalty missed) 45+1'; Haider Majed 45+1'; Messouke Oloumou 48'		Mohanad Ali 1', 56'; Alaa Abdul-Zahra 88'	Stadium: Karbala International Stadium

19 February 2024 15	Al-Talaba	2 – 1	Al-Shorta	Baghdad
16:00 GMT	Zaid Tahseen 74' (pen.); Mahdi Kamel 90'		Ali Husni 38'	Stadium: Al-Shaab Stadium

24 February 2024 16	Al-Shorta	2 – 1	Al-Kahrabaa	Baghdad
16:00 GMT	Mahmoud Al-Mawas 18', 90+6'		Muhaimen Salim 10'	Stadium: Al-Madina Stadium

29 February 2024 17	Newroz	1 – 1	Al-Shorta	Sulaymaniya
11:30 GMT	Marwan Hussein 2'		Mahmoud Al-Mawas 35'	Stadium: Sulaymaniya Stadium

4 March 2024 18	Al-Shorta	3 – 0	Naft Maysan	Baghdad
18:00 GMT	Mohanad Ali 14' (pen.), 63'; Ali Husni 90+5'			Stadium: Al-Shaab Stadium

8 March 2024 19	Al-Karkh	1 – 4	Al-Shorta	Baghdad
11:30 GMT	Saleh Gomaa 45+3'		Mahmoud Al-Mawas 15', 90+3'; Hussein Ali 24'; Abdul-Razzaq Qasim 62'	Stadium: Al-Saher Ahmed Radhi Stadium

1 April 2024 20	Al-Shorta	2 – 0	Al-Hudood	Baghdad
18:30 GMT	Hussein Ali 26'; Mohanad Ali 79'			Stadium: Al-Shaab Stadium

5 April 2024 21	Naft Al-Wasat	0 – 1	Al-Shorta	Najaf
18:30 GMT	Abbas Jassim (yellow card) 40' (yellow-red card) 41'		Mohanad Ali 54'	Stadium: Al-Najaf International Stadium

14 April 2024 22	Al-Shorta	2 – 0	Al-Minaa	Baghdad
14:30 GMT	Munaf Younis 76'; Lucas Santos 78'		Haider Salem (red card) 45+8'	Stadium: Al-Shaab Stadium

21 April 2024 23	Erbil	2 – 4	Al-Shorta	Erbil
17:30 GMT	Mohammed Qasim Nassif 32', 90+3'		Mohanad Ali 40'; Hussein Ali 50'; Ali Husni 74'; Zidane Abdul-Jabbar 87'	Stadium: Franso Hariri Stadium

25 April 2024 24	Al-Naft	1 – 1	Al-Shorta	Baghdad
17:15 GMT	Ndifreke Udo 64'		Mohanad Ali 45'; Hussein Ali (penalty missed) 85'	Stadium: Al-Madina Stadium

30 April 2024 25	Al-Shorta	1 – 1	Al-Quwa Al-Jawiya	Baghdad
17:15 GMT	Mahmoud Al-Mawas 24'; Karrar Amer (yellow card) (yellow-red card) 88'		Aymen Hussein 21' (pen.)	Stadium: Al-Shaab Stadium

4 May 2024 26	Al-Shorta	4 – 4	Newroz	Baghdad
12:30 GMT	Zidane Abdul-Jabbar 5'; Mohanad Ali 32'; Mahmoud Al-Mawas 89'; Alaa Abdul-Zahra 90+2'; Abdoul Madjid Moumouni (red card) 90+4'		Ahmed Basil 31' (o.g.); Ibrahim Tomiwa 34', 79'; Murtadha Hudaib 55'; Cláudio Maradona (red card) 90+4'; Deyar Yakhy (yellow card) (yellow-red card) 90+16'	Stadium: Al-Shaab Stadium

8 May 2024 27	Al-Kahrabaa	2 – 2	Al-Shorta	Baghdad
19:30 GMT	Ali Khaled 73'; Rafiq Aminu 83'		Hussein Ali 11'; Mahmoud Al-Mawas 55' (pen.)	Stadium: Al-Zawraa Stadium

13 May 2024 28	Al-Shorta	2 – 1	Amanat Baghdad	Baghdad
15:00 GMT	Mohanad Ali 8' (pen.); Lucas Santos 90+9' (pen.)		Mohammed Jaffal 90+14' (pen.)	Stadium: Al-Shaab Stadium

17 May 2024 29	Karbala	1 – 2	Al-Shorta	Karbala
17:30 GMT	Karim Benarif 90+1' (pen.)		Bassam Shakir 18'; Mahmoud Al-Mawas 58'	Stadium: Karbala International Stadium

21 May 2024 30	Al-Shorta	2 – 1	Al-Karkh	Baghdad
15:15 GMT	Mahmoud Al-Mawas 61' (pen.); Bassam Shakir 87'		Younis Ghani 41' (pen.)	Stadium: Al-Shaab Stadium

25 May 2024 31	Al-Shorta	2 – 0	Al-Qasim	Baghdad
15:00 GMT	Mohanad Ali 57'; Dennis Chembezi 88' (o.g.)			Stadium: Al-Shaab Stadium

30 May 2024 32	Naft Maysan	2 – 3	Al-Shorta	Maysan
15:00 GMT	Alaa Saad 43' (pen.); Hussein Amer 74'		Mohanad Ali 16'; Karrar Amer 19'; Munaf Younis (yellow card) (yellow-red card) 49'; Mahmoud Al-Mawas 90+3'	Stadium: Maysan Olympic Stadium

19 June 2024 33	Zakho	0 – 0	Al-Shorta	Zakho
16:30 GMT				Stadium: Zakho International Stadium

23 June 2024 34	Al-Shorta	3 – 2	Al-Talaba	Baghdad
16:30 GMT	Mahmoud Al-Mawas 38', 50'; Abdul-Razzaq Qasim 83'		Wael Ben Othmane 36'; Zaid Tahseen 90+1'	Stadium: Al-Shaab Stadium

27 June 2024 35	Al-Shorta	1 – 0	Naft Al-Basra	Baghdad
16:30 GMT	Mahmoud Al-Mawas 12'			Stadium: Al-Shaab Stadium

1 July 2024 36	Al-Najaf	2 – 2	Al-Shorta	Najaf
18:30 GMT	Hazem Mestouri 15'; Bechir Ghariani 26'		Ali Husni 90+1'; Sajjad Jassim 90+16' (pen.)	Stadium: Al-Najaf International Stadium

4 July 2024 37	Al-Shorta	1 – 0	Duhok	Baghdad
14:00 GMT	Abdoul Madjid Moumouni 51'			Stadium: Al-Shaab Stadium

14 July 2024 38	Al-Zawraa	0 – 2	Al-Shorta	Baghdad
16:30 GMT			Alaa Abdul-Zahra 30'; Mahmoud Al-Mawas 45+3'	Stadium: Al-Shaab Stadium

==== Score overview ====
Win Draw Loss

Opposition	Home score	Away score	Double
Al-Hudood	2–0	4–0	Yes
Al-Kahrabaa	2–1	2–2	No
Al-Karkh	2–1	4–1	Yes
Al-Minaa	2–0	3–0	Yes
Al-Naft	0–1	1–1	No
Al-Najaf	2–0	2–2	No
Al-Qasim	2–0	3–2	Yes
Al-Quwa Al-Jawiya	1–1	2–2	No
Al-Talaba	3–2	1–2	No
Al-Zawraa	2–2	2–0	No
Amanat Baghdad	2–1	2–1	Yes
Duhok	1–0	0–2	No
Erbil	2–1	4–2	Yes
Karbala	2–1	2–1	Yes
Naft Al-Basra	1–0	1–0	Yes
Naft Al-Wasat	3–0	1–0	Yes
Naft Maysan	3–0	3–2	Yes
Newroz	4–4	1–1	No
Zakho	2–0	0–0	No

Note: Al-Shorta goals listed first.

==== Classification ====
Pos	Team	Pld	W	D	L	GF	GA	GD	Pts	Qualification or relegation
1	Al-Shorta (C)	38	26	9	3	76	36	+40	87	Qualification for the AFC Champions League Elite league stage
2	Al-Quwa Al-Jawiya	38	24	10	4	68	32	+36	82	Qualification for the AFC Champions League Two group stage (Note: Since the winners of the 2023–24 Iraq FA Cup, Al-Shorta, qualified for the AFC Champions League Elite based on league position, the AFC Champions League Two spot was passed to the league runners-up Al-Quwa Al-Jawiya.)
3	Al-Zawraa	38	21	12	5	54	23	+31	75	Qualification for the regional competition play-offs
4	Al-Najaf	38	19	10	9	45	28	+17	67 (Note: Al-Najaf finished ahead of Zakho on head-to-head points: Zakho 1–1 Al-Najaf, Al-Najaf 2–1 Zakho.)	Qualification for the regional competition play-offs
5	Zakho	38	17	16	5	37	20	+17	67	Qualification for the regional competition play-offs

Source: IPFL
Rules for classification: 1) points; 2) head-to-head points; 3) head-to-head goal difference; 4) goal difference; 5) number of goals scored; 6) number of wins.
(C) Champions

==== Results summary ====
Overall								Home						Away					
Pld	W	D	L	GF	GA	GD	Pts	W	D	L	GF	GA	GD	W	D	L	GF	GA	GD
38	26	9	3	76	36	+40	87	15	3	1	38	15	+23	11	6	2	38	21	+17

Source: Kooora

==== Results by round ====
Round	1	2	3	4	5	6	7	8	9	10	11	12	13	14	15	16	17	18	19	20	21	22	23	24	25	26	27	28	29	30	31	32	33	34	35	36	37	38
Ground	A	H	A	H	A	H	A	H	A	H	H	A	H	A	A	H	A	H	A	H	A	H	A	A	H	H	A	H	A	H	H	A	A	H	H	A	H	A
Result	L	W	W	W	D	L	W	W	W	W	W	W	D	W	L	W	D	W	W	W	W	W	W	D	D	D	D	W	W	W	W	W	D	W	W	D	W	W
Position	19	10	4	2	3	6	3	2	2	2	2	2	2	2	2	2	2	2	2	1	1	1	1	1	1	1	2	2	1	1	1	1	1	1	1	1	1	1

Source: Kooora
A = Away; H = Home; W = Win; D = Draw; L = Loss

=== Iraq FA Cup ===
13 March 2024 Round of 16	Zakho	0 – 0 (3 – 4 p)	Al-Shorta	Zakho
18:30 GMT				Stadium: Zakho International Stadium
	Penalties
	Dione Miguel Ribas (penalty missed); Nasser Mohammedoh (penalty scored); Frank Cédric (penalty scored); Rodrick Kabwe (penalty missed); Amjad Attwan (penalty scored); Patrick Marcelino (penalty missed)		(penalty missed) Mahmoud Al-Mawas; (penalty scored) Lucas Santos; (penalty scored) Ali Husni; (penalty missed) Ameer Sabah; (penalty scored) Fahd Al-Youssef; (penalty scored) Sajjad Jassim

9 April 2024 Quarter-finals	Al-Minaa	0 – 2	Al-Shorta	Basra
18:30 GMT	Karrar Jafar (yellow card) (yellow-red card) 90+4'		Mohanad Ali 12'; Munaf Younis (red card) 14'; Sajjad Jassim 89' (pen.)	Stadium: Al-Minaa Olympic Stadium

7 July 2024 Semi-finals	Al-Shorta	1 – 0	Al-Naft	Baghdad
17:00 GMT	Hussein Ali 60'			Stadium: Al-Zawraa Stadium

10 July 2024 Final	Al-Shorta	1 – 0	Al-Quwa Al-Jawiya	Baghdad
17:00 GMT	Lucas Santos 59'; Alaa Abdul-Zahra (yellow card) 85' (yellow-red card) 87'			Stadium: Al-Shaab Stadium

== Top goalscorers ==
=== Iraq Stars League ===
Position	Nation	Squad Number	Name	Goals	Assists
FW	(Syria)	7	Mahmoud Al-Mawas	20	15
FW	(Iraq)	18	Mohanad Ali	16	0
MF	(Senegal)	20	Idrissa Niang	5	0
MF	(Iraq)	9	Hussein Ali	4	2
MF	(Iraq)	13	Ali Husni	4	2
MF	(Iraq)	11	Bassam Shakir	3	3
MF	(Niger)	14	Abdoul Madjid Moumouni	3	3
DF	(Iraq)	3	Karrar Amer	3	1
MF	(Iraq)	6	Sajjad Jassim	3	1
FW	(Iraq)	10	Alaa Abdul-Zahra	3	1
FW	(Brazil)	28	Lucas Santos	2	2
FW	(Iraq)	8	Zidane Abdul-Jabbar	2	1
MF	(Iraq)	25	Abdul-Razzaq Qasim	2	1
DF	(Iraq)	4	Munaf Younis	1	0
MF	(Iraq)	16	Mohammed Mezher	1	0
DF	(Iraq)	27	Ameer Sabah	0	5
MF	(Syria)	30	Fahd Al-Youssef	0	5
DF	(Iraq)	15	Ahmed Yahya	0	3

=== Iraq FA Cup ===
Position	Nation	Squad Number	Name	Goals	Assists
MF	(Iraq)	9	Hussein Ali	1	1
MF	(Iraq)	6	Sajjad Jassim	1	0
FW	(Iraq)	18	Mohanad Ali	1	0
FW	(Brazil)	28	Lucas Santos	1	0
DF	(Iraq)	15	Ahmed Yahya	0	1
MF	(Syria)	30	Fahd Al-Youssef	0	1
