= 2021–22 Al-Shorta SC season =

Al-Shorta
2021–22 season
- President: (Iraq) Abdul-Halim Fahem
- Head coach: (Egypt) Moamen Soliman
- Ground: Al-Shaab Stadium
- Iraqi Premier League: 1st
- Iraq FA Cup: Round of 16
- Top goalscorer: League: Mahmoud Al-Mawas (22); All: Mahmoud Al-Mawas (22)
Home colours	Away colours

The 2021–22 season was Al-Shorta's 48th season in the Iraqi Premier League, having featured in all 47 previous editions of the competition. Al-Shorta participated in the Iraqi Premier League and the Iraq FA Cup, having finished fourth in the league in the 2020–21 season.

Under the management of Egyptian coach Moamen Soliman, Al-Shorta enjoyed one of the best league seasons in their history. Al-Shorta set a record for the earliest league title win in Iraq with seven rounds of the competition remaining, clinching the title with a 2–0 win over runners-up Al-Quwa Al-Jawiya. Al-Shorta also became the first club to beat all other teams in a 20-team season and the first club to win all Baghdad derbies home and away in one season.

Their tally of 91 points equalled the record set by Al-Talaba in 2001–02 for most points in a 38-game season, and they set a record for the largest title-winning margin by finishing 21 points clear at the top of the table. In the Iraq FA Cup, Al-Shorta were eliminated in the Round of 16 against Erbil on penalties.

== Player statistics ==
Numbers in parentheses denote appearances as substitute.

No.	Pos.	Nat.	Name	Premier League		FA Cup		Total	
No.	Pos.	Nat.	Name	Apps	Goals	Apps	Goals	Apps	Goals
1	GK	IRQ	Ahmed Basil	35	0	0	0	35	0
2	DF	IRQ	Khudhor Ali	1(2)	0	0	0	1(2)	0
3	DF	IRQ	Karrar Amer	18(6)	1	1	0	19(6)	1
4	DF	IRQ	Saad Natiq	28(2)	1	1	0	29(2)	1
5	DF	IRQ	Niaz Mohammed	9(3)	0	0(1)	0	9(4)	0
6	MF	IRQ	Sadeq Zamel	2(3)	0	1	0	3(3)	0
7	FW	SYR	Mahmoud Al-Mawas	32(3)	22	1	0	33(3)	22
8	MF	IRQ	Mohammed Jaffal	10(25)	3	2	0	12(25)	3
9	FW	IRQ	Ali Yousif	6(16)	4	0(1)	0	6(17)	4
10	FW	IRQ	Alaa Abdul-Zahra (captain)	11(7)	4	1	0	12(7)	4
11	MF	IRQ	Bassam Shakir	21(9)	5	1(1)	0	22(10)	5
12	GK	IRQ	Yassin Karim	2	0	2	0	4	0
13	MF	IRQ	Ali Husni	17(8)	3	1	0	18(8)	3
14	MF	NIG	Abdoul Madjid Moumouni	28	5	1	0	29	5
16	MF	IRQ	Mohammed Mezher	11(7)	0	1	0	12(7)	0
17	MF	IRQ	Hussein Younis	5(15)	0	0	0	5(15)	0
19	MF	IRQ	Mohammed Qasim Majid	19(3)	3	0	0	19(3)	3
20	DF	IRQ	Haidar Ali Hussein	0	0	0	0	0	0
21	GK	IRQ	Mohammed Abbas	1	0	0(1)	0	1(1)	0
22	MF	IRQ	Ammar Ghalib	0(8)	0	0(2)	0	0(10)	0
23	DF	IRQ	Waleed Salem (vice-captain)	6(3)	0	0	0	6(3)	0
24	DF	IRQ	Faisal Jassim	30(2)	0	1	0	31(2)	0
25	MF	IRQ	Abdul-Razzaq Qasim	15(13)	0	1	0	16(13)	0
26	FW	IRQ	Mohammed Qasim Nassif	0(2)	0	0	0	0(2)	0
27	DF	IRQ	Ameer Sabah	16(5)	0	0(1)	0	16(6)	0
29	FW	IRQ	Mohammed Dawood	22(10)	7	1	1	23(10)	8
30	MF	SYR	Fahd Al-Youssef	32	1	1	0	33	1
31	DF	IRQ	Ahmed Zero	7(5)	1	2	0	9(5)	1
32	DF	IRQ	Hassan Ashour	4(1)	0	1(1)	0	5(2)	0
33	FW	IRQ	Hussein Sadeq	0	0	0	0	0	0
34	DF	IRQ	Mustafa Maan	22(3)	0	0	0	22(3)	0
35	MF	IRQ	Ali Mahdi	4(5)	0	0(1)	0	4(6)	0
36	GK	IRQ	Abbas Karim	0	0	0	0	0	0
37	DF	IRQ	Haidar Adel	0	0	0	0	0	0
38	FW	IRQ	Abbas Mohammed	0	0	0	0	0	0
39	FW	IRQ	Dhulfiqar Younis	0	0	0	0	0	0
40	MF	IRQ	Zaid Mahdi	0	0	0	0	0	0
Players out on loan for rest of the season
	GK	IRQ	Abdul-Aziz Ammar	0	0	0	0	0	0
	DF	IRQ	Bilal Khudhair	0	0	0	0	0	0
	MF	IRQ	Atheer Salih	0	0	0	0	0	0
	MF	IRQ	Haidar Abdul-Salam	0	0	0	0	0	0
Players departed but featured this season
15	FW	NGA	Michael Ohanu	3(3)	0	1	0	4(3)	0
26	DF	IRQ	Ammar Kadhim	0	0	1	0	1	0
28	FW	NGA	Godwin Chika Okwara	1	0	0	0	1	0

== Personnel ==
=== Technical staff ===
Position	Name	Nationality
Head coach:	Moamen Soliman	(Egypt)
Assistant coach:	Ahmed Salah	(Iraq)
Assistant coach:	Hussein Abdul-Wahed	(Iraq)
Fitness coach:	Mazin Abdul-Sattar	(Iraq)
Goalkeeping coach:	Amrou Abdul-Salam	(Egypt)
Technical analyst:	Amrou Fathi	(Egypt)
Team manager:	Hashim Ridha	(Iraq)

=== Management ===
Position	Name	Nationality
President:	Abdul-Halim Fahem	(Iraq)
Vice-president:	Ghalib Al-Zamili	(Iraq)
Board secretary:	Uday Al-Rubaie	(Iraq)
Financial secretary	Ghazi Faisal	(Iraq)
Member of the Board:	Sadeq Faraj	(Iraq)
Member of the Board:	Abdul-Wahab Al-Taei	(Iraq)
Member of the Board:	Ali Al-Shahmani	(Iraq)
Member of the Board:	Alaa Bahr Al-Uloom	(Iraq)
Member of the Board:	Tahseen Al-Yassri	(Iraq)

== Kit ==
Period	Home colours	Away colours	Supplier
September 2021 – December 2021			Qitharah (club's own brand)
December 2021 – June 2022			Qitharah (club's own brand)

== Transfers ==
=== In ===
Date	Pos.	Name	From	Fee
August 2021	MF	(Iraq) Sadeq Zamel	(Iraq) Naft Al-Wasat	End of loan
August 2021	MF	(Iraq) Mohammed Jaffal	(Iraq) Al-Talaba	-
August 2021	DF	(Iraq) Ameer Sabah	(Iraq) Al-Talaba	-
August 2021	GK	(Iraq) Mohammed Abbas	(Iraq) Al-Kahrabaa	-
August 2021	DF	(Iraq) Mustafa Maan	(Iraq) Al-Quwa Al-Jawiya	-
August 2021	MF	(Iraq) Abdul-Razzaq Qasim	(Iraq) Al-Karkh	-
August 2021	GK	(Iraq) Yassin Karim	(Iraq) Al-Minaa	-
August 2021	DF	(Iraq) Ahmed Zero	(Iraq) Zakho	-
August 2021	FW	(Iraq) Bassam Shakir	(Iraq) Al-Naft	-
August 2021	DF	(Iraq) Ammar Kadhim	(Iraq) Al-Naft	-
August 2021	DF	(Iraq) Faisal Jassim	(Iraq) Naft Al-Wasat	-
August 2021	DF	(Iraq) Niaz Mohammed	(Iraq) Erbil	-
August 2021	DF	(Iraq) Waleed Salem	(Iraq) Naft Al-Wasat	-
August 2021	FW	(Iraq) Alaa Abdul-Zahra	(Iraq) Al-Zawraa	-
September 2021	MF	(Iraq) Hussein Younis	(Iraq) Al-Minaa	-
September 2021	MF	(Niger) Abdoul Madjid Moumouni	(Iraq) Al-Minaa	-
September 2021	FW	(Syria) Mahmoud Al-Mawas	(Romania) FC Botoșani	-
September 2021	FW	(Nigeria) Michael Ohanu	(Nigeria) Kwara United	$50,000
January 2022	FW	(Iraq) Mohammed Qasim Nassif	(Iraq) Al-Quwa Al-Jawiya	-
January 2022	FW	(Nigeria) Godwin Chika Okwara	(Uzbekistan) FK Mash'al Mubarek	-

=== Out ===
Date	Pos.	Name	To	Fee
August 2021	FW	(Venezuela) Gelmin Rivas		Released
August 2021	GK	(Iraq) Alaa Khalil	(Iraq) Al-Talaba	-
August 2021	FW	(Iraq) Marwan Hussein	(Iraq) Al-Naft	-
August 2021	MF	(Iraq) Amjad Attwan	(Qatar) Al-Shamal	-
August 2021	DF	(Iraq) Alaa Mhawi	(Iraq) Al-Zawraa	-
August 2021	MF	(Iraq) Saad Abdul-Amir	(Iraq) Al-Zawraa	-
August 2021	MF	(Iraq) Hassan Abdul-Karim	(Iraq) Al-Karkh	-
August 2021	FW	(Iraq) Mazin Fayyadh	(Iraq) Al-Zawraa	-
August 2021	DF	(Iraq) Hussam Kadhim	(Iraq) Al-Zawraa	-
August 2021	MF	(Iraq) Atheer Salih	(Iraq) Al-Sinaa	Loan
August 2021	MF	(Iraq) Haidar Abdul-Salam	(Iraq) Al-Minaa	Loan
August 2021	DF	(Iraq) Uday Shehab	(Iraq) Al-Naft	-
August 2021	MF	(Iraq) Jassim Mohammed	(Iraq) Al-Naft	-
August 2021	MF	(Iraq) Ahmed Jalal	(Iraq) Naft Al-Basra	-
September 2021	FW	(Iraq) Murad Mohammed	(Iraq) Naft Al-Wasat	-
September 2021	GK	(Iraq) Mohammed Hameed	(Iraq) Al-Naft	-
September 2021	DF	(Iraq) Ali Faez	(Kuwait) Al-Qadsia	-
December 2021	FW	(Iraq) Ali Jasim	(Iraq) Al-Kahrabaa	-
January 2022	DF	(Iraq) Ammar Kadhim	(Iraq) Naft Al-Basra	-
April 2022	FW	(Nigeria) Michael Ohanu		Released
April 2022	FW	(Nigeria) Godwin Chika Okwara		Released

== Competitions ==
=== Iraqi Premier League ===
20 September 2021 1	Al-Shorta	1 – 0	Al-Talaba	Baghdad
16:00 GMT	Mahmoud Al-Mawas 42'			Stadium: Al-Shaab Stadium

26 September 2021 2	Al-Kahrabaa	0 – 2	Al-Shorta	Baghdad
12:30 GMT			Mohammed Dawood 61'; Mohammed Jaffal 88'	Stadium: Al-Taji Stadium

1 October 2021 3	Al-Shorta	2 – 2	Erbil	Baghdad
12:30 GMT	Karrar Amer 39'; Alaa Abdul-Zahra 44'; Mahmoud Al-Mawas (penalty missed) 74'		Sherko Karim 12' (pen.); Shafiu Mumuni 59'	Stadium: Al-Shaab Stadium

15 October 2021 4	Naft Al-Basra	1 – 3	Al-Shorta	Basra
16:30 GMT	Haider Abdul-Rahim 8'		Alaa Abdul-Zahra 53'; Fahd Al-Youssef 60'; Mahmoud Al-Mawas 80'	Stadium: Al-Fayhaa Stadium

21 October 2021 5	Al-Shorta	3 – 2	Zakho	Baghdad
14:15 GMT	Alaa Abdul-Zahra 33'; Mohammed Qasim Majid 48'; Mahmoud Al-Mawas 90+2'		Yaser Kasim 42'; Lucas Santos 47'	Stadium: Al-Shaab Stadium

25 October 2021 6	Al-Naft	0 – 1	Al-Shorta	Baghdad
12:00 GMT			Abdoul Madjid Moumouni 56'	Stadium: Al-Naft Stadium

30 October 2021 7	Al-Shorta	3 – 0	Naft Al-Wasat	Baghdad
15:00 GMT	Mahmoud Al-Mawas 38', 48'; Ahmed Zero 78'		Didier Koré (yellow card) (yellow-red card) 61'	Stadium: Al-Shaab Stadium

5 November 2021 8	Al-Shorta	1 – 0	Al-Quwa Al-Jawiya	Baghdad
16:30 GMT	Mahmoud Al-Mawas 60'			Stadium: Al-Shaab Stadium

15 November 2021 9	Al-Sinaa	0 – 1	Al-Shorta	Baghdad
11:30 GMT			Mohammed Jaffal 77'	Stadium: Al-Sinaa Stadium

20 November 2021 10	Al-Shorta	0 – 0	Al-Qasim	Karbala
13:00 GMT				Stadium: Karbala International Stadium

25 November 2021 11	Samarra	0 – 3	Al-Shorta	Samarra
11:00 GMT			Alaa Abdul-Zahra 22'; Mohammed Dawood 50'; Abdoul Madjid Moumouni 63'	Stadium: Samarra Stadium

12 December 2021 12	Al-Shorta	2 – 0	Naft Maysan	Baghdad
15:00 GMT	Mahmoud Al-Mawas 49' (pen.); Abdoul Madjid Moumouni 81'			Stadium: Al-Shaab Stadium

17 December 2021 13	Newroz	2 – 3	Al-Shorta	Sulaymaniya
11:00 GMT	Diar Ali 49'; Ibrahim Mohammed 75'		Abdoul Madjid Moumouni 58'; Bilal Belmubarak 64' (o.g.); Mohammed Dawood 76'	Stadium: Sulaymaniya Stadium

22 December 2021 14	Al-Karkh	0 – 1	Al-Shorta	Baghdad
10:45 GMT			Mahmoud Al-Mawas 35' (pen.)	Stadium: Al-Saher Ahmed Radhi Stadium

26 December 2021 15	Al-Shorta	3 – 1	Al-Minaa	Baghdad
13:00 GMT	Faisal Jassim (red card) 29'; Mahmoud Al-Mawas 62' (pen.), 72'; Ali Husni 90+2'		Nasser Al-Gahwashi 32' (pen.); Ibrahim Naeem (yellow card) (yellow-red card) 59'	Stadium: Al-Shaab Stadium

31 December 2021 16	Amanat Baghdad	1 – 3	Al-Shorta	Baghdad
11:00 GMT	Jabbar Karim 27'		Mahmoud Al-Mawas 7'; Bassam Shakir 47'; Mohammed Dawood 90+3'	Stadium: Amanat Baghdad Stadium

5 January 2022 17	Al-Zawraa	1 – 2	Al-Shorta	Baghdad
14:45 GMT	Mazin Fayyadh 17'		Mahmoud Al-Mawas 44' (pen.); Mahdi Kamel 69' (o.g.)	Stadium: Al-Shaab Stadium

10 January 2022 18	Al-Shorta	1 – 0	Al-Najaf	Baghdad
13:00 GMT	Ali Yousif 53'			Stadium: Al-Shaab Stadium

16 January 2022 19	Al-Shorta	2 – 1	Al-Diwaniya	Baghdad
16:00 GMT	Mahmoud Al-Mawas 28'; Ali Husni 62'		Mohammed Jummah 12'	Stadium: Al-Shaab Stadium

8 February 2022 20	Al-Talaba	0 – 1	Al-Shorta	Baghdad
17:15 GMT			Ali Yousif 90+2'	Stadium: Al-Shaab Stadium

14 February 2022 21	Al-Shorta	0 – 0	Al-Kahrabaa	Baghdad
15:00 GMT			Mustafa Ali (penalty missed) 89'	Stadium: Al-Shaab Stadium

20 February 2022 22	Erbil	0 – 1	Al-Shorta	Erbil
15:00 GMT	Sherko Karim (penalty missed) 85'		Mahmoud Al-Mawas 71'	Stadium: Franso Hariri Stadium

25 February 2022 23	Al-Shorta	2 – 0	Naft Al-Basra	Baghdad
12:45 GMT	Mahmoud Al-Mawas 54'; Mohammed Dawood 87'			Stadium: Al-Shaab Stadium

2 March 2022 24	Zakho	1 – 1	Al-Shorta	Zakho
10:30 GMT	Frank Cédric Abogo 78'		Mohammed Dawood 56'	Stadium: Zakho International Stadium

8 March 2022 25	Al-Shorta	1 – 0	Al-Naft	Baghdad
15:30 GMT	Ali Yousif 75'			Stadium: Al-Shaab Stadium

4 April 2022 26	Naft Al-Wasat	2 – 1	Al-Shorta	Najaf
19:00 GMT	Ahmed Ammar 54'; Hussein Abdul-Wahid Khalaf 60'		Ahmed Ammar 34' (o.g.)	Stadium: Al-Najaf International Stadium

20 April 2022 27	Al-Shorta	1 – 0	Al-Sinaa	Baghdad
19:00 GMT	Mohammed Jaffal 90+1'			Stadium: Al-Shaab Stadium

26 April 2022 28	Al-Qasim	0 – 3	Al-Shorta	Babil
12:30 GMT			Mohammed Qasim Majid 31', 56'; Mahmoud Al-Mawas 45'	Stadium: Al-Kifl Olympic Stadium

4 May 2022 29	Al-Shorta	3 – 0	Samarra	Baghdad
19:00 GMT	Mahmoud Al-Mawas 37'; Bassam Shakir 45+1'; Milad Al-Omaisi 62' (o.g.)			Stadium: Al-Shaab Stadium

11 May 2022 30	Naft Maysan	0 – 2	Al-Shorta	Amara
19:00 GMT	Alaa Khalil (red card) 60'; Akram Rahim (yellow card) (yellow-red card) 90+6'		Bassam Shakir 41'; Mahmoud Al-Mawas 66'	Stadium: Maysan Olympic Stadium
Note: The match was stopped for 27 minutes during the second half due to a power outage in the stadium.

17 May 2022 31	Al-Quwa Al-Jawiya	0 – 2	Al-Shorta	Baghdad
17:00 GMT			Mahmoud Al-Mawas 26'; Ali Husni 46'	Stadium: Al-Shaab Stadium

21 May 2022 32	Al-Shorta	2 – 3	Newroz	Baghdad
13:00 GMT	Ali Yousif 8'; Abdoul Madjid Moumouni 45+1'		Aso Rostam 18', 74' (pen.); Mohammed Sami 45+3'	Stadium: Al-Shaab Stadium

29 May 2022 33	Al-Shorta	1 – 2	Al-Karkh	Baghdad
18:00 GMT	Mahmoud Al-Mawas 24'		Ahmed Salah 52'; Mustafa Hanoon 86'	Stadium: Al-Shaab Stadium

2 June 2022 34	Al-Minaa	1 – 1	Al-Shorta	Basra
16:15 GMT	Mohammed Jabbar Shokan 52'		Mahmoud Al-Mawas 58'	Stadium: Al-Fayhaa Stadium

7 June 2022 35	Al-Shorta	2 – 0	Amanat Baghdad	Baghdad
18:45 GMT	Bassam Shakir 43'; Saad Natiq 62'			Stadium: Al-Shaab Stadium

18 June 2022 36	Al-Shorta	2 – 0	Al-Zawraa	Baghdad
17:30 GMT	Bassam Shakir 73'; Mahmoud Al-Mawas 81'			Stadium: Al-Shaab Stadium

23 June 2022 37	Al-Najaf	0 – 0	Al-Shorta	Najaf
16:30 GMT				Stadium: Al-Najaf International Stadium

29 June 2022 38	Al-Diwaniya	1 – 1	Al-Shorta	Al-Diwaniya
14:00 GMT	Anas Malik 44'		Mohammed Dawood 19'	Stadium: Al-Diwaniya Stadium

==== Score overview ====
Win Draw Loss

Opposition	Home score	Away score	Double
Al-Diwaniya	2–1	1–1	No
Al-Kahrabaa	0–0	2–0	No
Al-Karkh	1–2	1–0	No
Al-Minaa	3–1	1–1	No
Al-Naft	1–0	1–0	Yes
Al-Najaf	1–0	0–0	No
Al-Qasim	0–0	3–0	No
Al-Quwa Al-Jawiya	1–0	2–0	Yes
Al-Sinaa	1–0	1–0	Yes
Al-Talaba	1–0	1–0	Yes
Al-Zawraa	2–0	2–1	Yes
Amanat Baghdad	2–0	3–1	Yes
Erbil	2–2	1–0	No
Naft Al-Basra	2–0	3–1	Yes
Naft Al-Wasat	3–0	1–2	No
Naft Maysan	2–0	2–0	Yes
Newroz	2–3	3–2	No
Samarra	3–0	3–0	Yes
Zakho	3–2	1–1	No

Note: Al-Shorta goals listed first.

==== Classification ====
Pos	Team	Pld	W	D	L	GF	GA	GD	Pts	Qualification or relegation
1	Al-Shorta (C)	38	28	7	3	64	21	+43	91	Qualification for the Arab Club Champions Cup group stage
2	Al-Quwa Al-Jawiya	38	20	10	8	50	31	+19	70	Qualification for the Arab Club Champions Cup first qualifying round
3	Al-Talaba	38	20	9	9	54	33	+21	69	
4	Al-Naft	38	16	16	6	38	20	+18	64 (Note: Al-Naft finished ahead of Naft Al-Wasat on head-to-head points: Al-Naft 1–1 Naft Al-Wasat, Naft Al-Wasat 0–2 Al-Naft.)	
5	Naft Al-Wasat	38	17	13	8	50	36	+14	64	

Source: IPFL
Rules for classification: 1) points; 2) head-to-head points; 3) head-to-head goal difference; 4) goal difference; 5) number of wins; 6) number of goals scored.
(C) Champions

==== Results summary ====
Overall								Home						Away					
Pld	W	D	L	GF	GA	GD	Pts	W	D	L	GF	GA	GD	W	D	L	GF	GA	GD
38	28	7	3	64	21	+43	91	14	3	2	32	11	+21	14	4	1	32	10	+22

Source: Kooora

==== Results by round ====
Round	1	2	3	4	5	6	7	8	9	10	11	12	13	14	15	16	17	18	19	20	21	22	23	24	25	26	27	28	29	30	31	32	33	34	35	36	37	38
Ground	H	A	H	A	H	A	H	H	A	H	A	H	A	A	H	A	A	H	H	A	H	A	H	A	H	A	H	A	H	A	A	H	H	A	H	H	A	A
Result	W	W	D	W	W	W	W	W	W	D	W	W	W	W	W	W	W	W	W	W	D	W	W	D	W	L	W	W	W	W	W	L	L	D	W	W	D	D
Position	5	2	3	2	2	2	1	1	1	1	1	1	1	1	1	1	1	1	1	1	1	1	1	1	1	1	1	1	1	1	1	1	1	1	1	1	1	1

Source: Kooora
A = Away; H = Home; W = Win; D = Draw; L = Loss

=== Iraq FA Cup ===
10 November 2021 Round of 32	Al-Shorta	1 – 0	Al-Sufiya	Baghdad
11:30 GMT	Mohammed Dawood 79'; Saad Natiq (red card) 79'			Stadium: Al-Sinaa Stadium

4 December 2021 Round of 16	Erbil	0 – 0 (4 – 3 p)	Al-Shorta	Erbil
13:15 GMT				Stadium: Franso Hariri Stadium
	Penalties
	Kosrat Baez (penalty scored); Haidar Qaraman (penalty missed); Safin Mansour (penalty scored); André Castro (penalty scored); Ali Serhan (penalty scored)		(penalty scored) Mohammed Jaffal; (penalty scored) Hassan Ashour; (penalty missed) Ammar Ghalib; (penalty scored) Mahmoud Al-Mawas; (penalty missed) Alaa Abdul-Zahra

== Top goalscorers ==
=== Iraqi Premier League ===
Position	Nation	Squad Number	Name	Goals	Assists
FW	(Syria)	7	Mahmoud Al-Mawas	22	8
FW	(Iraq)	29	Mohammed Dawood	7	1
MF	(Iraq)	11	Bassam Shakir	5	5
MF	(Niger)	14	Abdoul Madjid Moumouni	5	0
FW	(Iraq)	10	Alaa Abdul-Zahra	4	1
FW	(Iraq)	9	Ali Yousif	4	0
MF	(Iraq)	19	Mohammed Qasim Majid	3	7
MF	(Iraq)	13	Ali Husni	3	3
MF	(Iraq)	8	Mohammed Jaffal	3	2
MF	(Syria)	30	Fahd Al-Youssef	1	6
DF	(Iraq)	4	Saad Natiq	1	1
DF	(Iraq)	3	Karrar Amer	1	0
DF	(Iraq)	31	Ahmed Zero	1	0
DF	(Iraq)	27	Ameer Sabah	0	5
MF	(Iraq)	16	Mohammed Mezher	0	2
DF	(Iraq)	34	Mustafa Maan	0	2
FW	(Nigeria)	15	Michael Ohanu	0	1

=== Iraq FA Cup ===
Position	Nation	Squad Number	Name	Goals	Assists
FW	(Iraq)	29	Mohammed Dawood	1	0
