= 2022 Iraqi Super Cup =

Football match

Al-Shorta	Al-Karkh
1	0
- Date: 2 October 2022
- Venue: Al-Madina Stadium, Baghdad
- Referee: Ali Sabah

The 2022 Iraqi Super Cup was the 11th edition of the Iraqi Super Cup. It was held on 2 October 2022 between the 2021–22 Iraqi Premier League champions Al-Shorta and the 2021–22 Iraq FA Cup winners Al-Karkh at Al-Madina Stadium. Al-Shorta made their third appearance in the Super Cup while Al-Karkh made their first appearance. Al-Shorta won the match 1–0 with a goal from Abdoul Madjid Moumouni to clinch their second Super Cup title.

== Match ==
=== Details ===
2 October 2022
19:00 UTC+03:00

Al-Shorta	1–0	Al-Karkh
Moumouni 43'

Al-Madina Stadium, Baghdad
Referee: Ali Sabah

Al-Shorta	Al-Karkh

GK	1	(Iraq) Ahmed Basil (c)
RB	31	(Iraq) Ahmed Zero		(substituted off) 88'
CB	24	(Iraq) Faisal Jassim
CB	3	(Iraq) Karrar Amer
LB	15	(Iraq) Ahmed Yahya
CM	14	(Niger) Abdoul Madjid Moumouni		(substituted off) 46'
CM	20	(Senegal) Idrissa Niang		(substituted off) 73'
CM	30	(Syria) Fahd Al-Youssef
RW	29	(Iraq) Mohammed Dawood
LW	13	(Iraq) Ali Husni		(substituted off) 73'
CF	7	(Syria) Mahmoud Al-Mawas	(yellow card) 66'	(substituted off) 88'
Substitutes:
GK	12	(Iraq) Yassin Karim
DF	4	(Iraq) Munaf Younis		(substituted on) 88'
DF	27	(Iraq) Ameer Sabah
MF	6	(Iraq) Sajjad Jassim		(substituted on) 73'
MF	8	(Iraq) Mohammed Jaffal
MF	16	(Iraq) Mohammed Mezher		(substituted on) 73'
MF	25	(Iraq) Abdul-Razzaq Qasim		(substituted on) 46'
FW	9	(Syria) Mardik Mardikian		(substituted on) 88'
FW	10	(Iraq) Alaa Abdul-Zahra
Manager:
(Egypt) Moamen Soliman

GK	1	(Iraq) Abid Salim
RB	56	(Brazil) Leanderson Lucas
CB	3	(Brazil) Caio Acaraú	(yellow card) 73'
CB	4	(Iraq) Omar Nouri
LB	23	(Iraq) Karrar Saad	(yellow card) (yellow-red card) 90+4'
CM	16	(Iraq) Shihab Razzaq (c)
CM	8	(Syria) Kamel Hmeisheh		(substituted off) 63'
CM	5	(Iraq) Youssef Fawzi		(substituted off) 79'
RW	98	(Brazil) Lucas Shallon		(substituted off) 63'
LW	11	(Iraq) Suhaib Raad	(yellow card) 26'	(substituted off) 46'
CF	17	(Iraq) Nihad Mohammed	(yellow card) 29'
Substitutes:
GK	12	(Iraq) Abdul-Aziz Ammar
DF	15	(Iraq) Hassan Mohammed
DF	30	(Iraq) Mustafa Waleed		(substituted on) 79'
DF	31	(Iraq) Rafid Talib
MF	10	(Iraq) Omar Abdul-Rahman	(yellow card) 85'	(substituted on) 46'
MF	25	(Iraq) Mohammed Maitham
MF	29	(Iraq) Ahmed Salah		(substituted on) 63'
MF	33	(Iraq) Mohammed Sherzad
FW	9	(Iraq) Jafar Obeis		(substituted on) 63'
Manager:
(Iraq) Ahmed Abdul-Jabar

Assistant referees:
Haider Abdul-Hassan
Ameer Dawood Hussein
Fourth official:
Yousif Saeed Hasan

Match rules

- 90 minutes.
- Penalty shoot-out if scores level.
- Nine named substitutes.
- Maximum of five substitutions.

Iraqi Super Cup
2022 winner
Al-Shorta
2nd title
