= Mohammed Dawood Yaseen =

Iraqi footballer

Personal information
- Full name: Mohammed Dawood Yaseen Al-Obaidi
- Date of birth: 22 November 2000 (age 25)
- Place of birth: Al-Za'franiya, Baghdad, Iraq
- Height: 1.75 m (5 ft 9 in)
- Positions: Forward; winger

Team information
- Current team: Al-Minaa
- Number: 29

Youth career
- 2013–2015: Al-Oloom wal-Technologia

Senior career*
Years	Team	Apps	(Gls)
2016	Al-Khutoot		
2016–2021	Al-Naft		(58)
2021–2026	Al-Shorta	130	(18)
2024	→ Al-Najaf (loan)		(10)
2026	Duhok		(2)
2026–	Al-Minaa		

International career
2016–2017	Iraq U17	9	(9)
2017–2018	Iraq U20	2	(1)
2018–	Iraq	8	(1)
- * Club domestic league appearances and goals as of 14 March 2026

Mohammed Dawood Yaseen Al-Obaidi (Arabic: مُحَمَّد دَاوُود يَاسِين الْعُبَيْدِيّ, born 22 November 2000), is an Iraqi footballer who plays as a forward. He plays for Al-Minaa in the Iraq Stars League, and for the Iraq national team.

== Club career ==
Dawood began his youth career at his native Al-Oloom wal-Technologia. He moved to Al-Khutoot and then joined Al-Naft SC in summer 2016, He scored his first league goal for Al-Naft in February 2017 against Al-Hussein SC in the Iraqi Premier League, He scored another 8 goals in his debut season, and assisted so many others. In season 2017–2018, he was the team's top scorer 18 goals, he was predominantly playing left winger.

In 14 June 2026, he moved to Al Minaa.

== International career ==
=== Iraq U-17 ===
Dawood was first called up to Iraq national under-17 team squad for the 2016 AFC U-16 Championship, on 16 September 2016 he played against South Korea and helped Iraq claim a first ever AFC U-16 Championship before the striker picked up the tournament's Most Valuable Player and Top Scorer awards.

=== International goals ===
Scores and results list Iraq's goal tally first.

#	Date	Venue	Opponent	Score	Result	Competition
1.	27 January 2021	Basra Sports City, Basra	Kuwait	1–1	2–1	Friendly

== Style of play ==
Described as “ a very good player and studies the opponents very well,” added coach Chathir. “He is very talented and can play on the left and right side”, was featured in The Guardian's list of the 60 best young talents in world football 2017.

== Honours ==
=== Club ===
Al-Shorta

- Iraq Stars League: 2021–22, 2022–23, 2024–25
- Iraqi Super Cup: 2022

=== International ===
Iraq U-17

- 2016 AFC U-16 Championship

=== Individual ===
- 2016 AFC U-16 Championship: MVP
- 2016 AFC U-16 Championship: Top Scorer
