= Ahmed Basil =

Iraqi footballer (born 1994)

Ahmed Basil Fadhil
Personal information
- Full name: Ahmed Basil Fadhil Al Fadhli
- Date of birth: 19 August 1996 (age 30)
- Place of birth: Baghdad, Iraq
- Height: 1.84 m (6 ft 0 in)
- Position: Goalkeeper

Team information
- Current team: Al-Zawraa
- Number: 1

Senior career*
Years	Team	Apps	(Gls)
2011–2012	Al-Taji		
2012–2013	Al-Karkh		
2013–2014	Al-Oloom wal-Technologia		
2014–2026	Al-Shorta		(0)
2026–	Al-Zawraa	6	(0)

International career^{‡}
2014	Iraq U20		
2017–2019	Iraq U23	4	(0)
2022–	Iraq	18	(0)
- * Club domestic league appearances and goals as of 30 June 2026 ‡ National team caps and goals as of 4 September 2025

Ahmed Basil Fadhil Al Fadhli (Arabic: أَحْمَد بَاسِل فَاضِل الْفَضْلِيّ; born 19 August 1996) is an Iraqi professional footballer who plays as a goalkeeper for the Iraq Stars League club Al-Zawraa and the Iraq national team.

== Club career ==
=== Early years ===
Basil started his career at Al-Taji where his team earned promotion to the Iraqi Premier League. He moved to Al-Karkh and also earned promotion there, before spending a season at Al-Oloom wal-Technologia.

=== Al-Shorta ===
In July 2014, Basil signed for Al-Shorta. Basil made one appearance in the club's 2018–19 Iraqi Premier League title-winning campaign, before making 35 appearances and keeping 22 clean sheets in their 2021–22 Iraqi Premier League title-winning season. He then captained Al-Shorta to the 2022 Iraqi Super Cup title. He remained the team's starting goalkeeper as Al-Shorta went on to win another three successive titles to make it a record four in a row.

Basil also played eleven matches for Al-Shorta in the AFC Champions League across the 2020 and 2021 editions, as well as playing one match at the 2019–20 Arab Club Champions Cup.

== International career ==
=== Youth ===
Basil played his first game with the Iraq U-23s in the 2018 AFC U-23 Championship qualifiers. He helped Iraq qualify for the tournament and was named in the final squad.

=== Senior ===
Basil was called up to the Iraqi national team for the first time in September 2020. Basil made his debut against Kuwait on 30 December 2022. Basil was called up to the Iraqi squad in the 25th Arabian Gulf Cup which Iraq won on home soil, but the player did not make an appearance.

In 2024, Ahmed Basil was called up to the 2023 AFC Asian Cup, he played the third group stage match in a 3–2 win over Vietnam. Iraq were knocked out in the round of 16 following a defeat against Jordan.

== Career statistics ==
=== International ===
As of match played 24 January 2024

Iraq
Year	Apps	Goals
2023	3	0
2024	1	0
Total	4	0

== Honours ==
Al-Karkh

- Iraqi First Division League: 2012–13

Al-Shorta

- Iraq Stars League: 2018–19, 2021–22, 2022–23, 2023–24, 2024–25
- Iraq FA Cup: 2023–24
- Iraqi Super Cup: 2019, 2022

Iraq

- Arabian Gulf Cup: 2023

Individual

- "Clean Sheet" Program's Goalkeeper of the Season: 2022–23
