= Sajjad Jassim =

Iraqi footballer

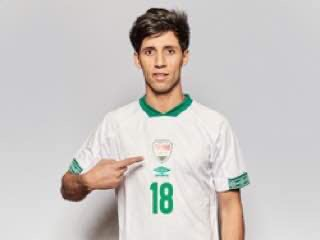

Personal information
- Full name: Sajjad Jassim Mousa Al-Msharrafawee
- Date of birth: 7 January 1998 (age 28)
- Place of birth: Iraq
- Height: 1.79 m (5 ft 10 in)
- Position: Midfielder

Team information
- Current team: Al-Karma
- Number: 6

Senior career*
Years	Team	Apps	(Gls)
2016–2017	Karbala		
2018–2022	Naft Al-Wasat		
2022–2025	Al-Shorta	81	(8)
2025–	Al-Karma		

International career^{‡}
2021–	Iraq	12	(2)
- * Club domestic league appearances and goals as of 2 July 2025 ‡ National team caps and goals as of 10 June 2025

Sajjad Jassim Mousa Al-Msharrafawee (Arabic: سَجَّاد جَاسِم مُوسَى الْمُشَرَّفَاوِيّ; born 7 January 1998) is an Iraqi footballer who plays as a midfielder for Al-Karma in the Iraq Stars League and the Iraq national team.

== International career ==
On 12 January 2021, Sajjad Jassim made his first international cap with Iraq against UAE in a friendly.

=== International goals ===
No	Date	Venue	Opponent	Score	Result	Competition
1.	29 May 2021	Al Fayhaa Stadium, Basra, Iraq	Nepal	6–2	6–2	Friendly
2.	10 June 2025	Amman International Stadium, Amman, Jordan	Jordan	1–0	1–0	2026 FIFA World Cup qualification

== Honours ==
=== Club ===
Al-Shorta

- Iraq Stars League: 2022–23, 2023–24, 2024–25
- Iraq FA Cup: 2023–24
- Iraqi Super Cup: 2022
