= Mohammed Qasim Nassif =

Iraqi footballer (born 1997)

Mohammed Nassif
Personal information
- Full name: Mohammed Qasim Nassif
- Date of birth: 25 August 1997 (age 29)
- Place of birth: Baghdad, Iraq
- Height: 1.77 m (5 ft 10 in)
- Position: Forward

Team information
- Current team: Al-Mosul
- Number: 26

Youth career
- 2016–2018: Al-Quwa Al-Jawiya

Senior career*
Years	Team	Apps	(Gls)
2018–2021	Al-Quwa Al-Jawiya		
2019	→ Naft Al-Wasat (loan)		
2021–2022	Naft Al-Basra		
2022	Al-Shorta	2	(0)
2022–2023	Karbala		
2023	Newroz		
2023–2024	Erbil		
2024–2025	Al-Quwa Al-Jawiya		
2025–2026	Al-Minaa		
2026–	Al-Mosul		

International career^{‡}
2019–2020	Iraq U23	3	(3)
- * Club domestic league appearances and goals as of 2 June 2026 ‡ National team caps and goals as of 14 January 2020

Mohammed Qasim Nassif (born 25 August 1997) is an Iraqi professional footballer who plays as a forward for Iraqi Stars League side Al-Mosul. He won the top scorer award with the Iraqi Olympic national team at the AFC U-23 Asian Cup in 2020. In 2019, he was also awarded the Best Young Iraqi Player award.

== Club career ==
Nassif began his football journey at the age of nine in the football school founded by the late legendary coach Ammo Baba, before progressing through the youth ranks of Al-Quwa Al-Jawiya. During his youth career, he enjoyed remarkable success, winning the Iraqi Youth League title and finishing as the league's top scorer, while also claiming the top scorer award in the Iraqi Republic Championship for youth teams.

He was later promoted to Al-Quwa Al-Jawiya's first team, but limited opportunities kept him from making official appearances. Consequently, in February 2019, he joined Naft Al-Wasat on loan until the end of the season at the request of coach Radhi Shenaishil. There, he showcased his attacking qualities by scoring 10 goals in 15 matches, prompting Al-Quwa Al-Jawiya to recall him and extend his contract for two additional seasons. In 2021, Naseef suffered a serious setback when he sustained an anterior cruciate ligament (ACL) injury during Al-Quwa Al-Jawiya's league clash against Al-Shorta on January 23, in the 15th round of the Iraqi Premier League. The injury sidelined him for an entire year. Following his recovery, he joined Naft Al-Basra in search of regaining his best form, stating that his desire to return to his previous level was the main reason behind leaving Al-Quwa Al-Jawiya.

He subsequently moved to Al-Shorta, where he contributed to the club's Iraqi Premier League title triumph. On September 4, 2022, he signed for Karbala, before joining Newroz on February 3, 2023. Later, on August 19, 2023, he moved to Erbil and enjoyed one of the finest seasons of his career, scoring 17 goals to finish fifth in the Iraqi Stars League scoring charts. On July 21, 2024, Naseef returned to Al-Quwa Al-Jawiya. He then joined Al-Minaa on August 23, 2025, continuing his professional career in Iraqi football.

== International career ==
Nassif was first picked to represent Iraq in 2020, when the under-23 coach Abdul-Ghani Shahad selected him to be a part of his 23-man squad to play in 2020 AFC U-23 Championship, which he was the Championship's top scorer, and the Asian Football Confederation ranked him among the most outstanding players who shone brightly in the group stage.

== Honours ==
Al-Quwa Al-Jawiya

- Iraqi Premier League: 2020–21
- Iraq FA Cup: 2020–21

Al-Shorta

- Iraqi Premier League: 2021–22

=== Individual ===
- 2020 AFC U-23 Championship: Top scorer
