= Idrissa Niang =

Senegalese footballer (born 1992)

Personal information
- Full name: Idrissa Niang
- Date of birth: 25 February 1992 (age 34)
- Place of birth: Richard Toll, Senegal
- Height: 1.75 m (5 ft 9 in)
- Position: Defensive midfielder

Team information
- Current team: Ahed
- Number: 92

Youth career
- 2008–2010: ASSUR

Senior career*
| Years | Team | Apps | (Gls) |
| 2010−2012 | ASSUR | | |
| 2013−2017 | Diaraf | | |
| 2017−2018 | ES Métlaoui | 12 | (0) |
| 2018−2020 | Nejmeh | 22 | (0) |
| 2020−2021 | Al-Mina'a | 24 | (0) |
| 2021−2022 | Al-Talaba | 12 | (4) |
| 2022−2025 | Al-Shorta | 51 | (10) |
| 2025−2026 | Al-Talaba | 8 | (1) |
| 2026− | Ahed | 1 | (1) |

International career
| 2013- | Senegal | 1 | (0) |
- * Club domestic league appearances and goals as of 23 January 2025

Idrissa Niang (born 25 February 1992) is a Senegalese professional footballer who plays as a defensive midfielder for Lebanese Premier League club Ahed.

== Club career ==
Niang started his career with the football academy of the AS Sucrière de La Réunion, he joined the junior team in 2008, before joining the first team in 2010. Niang then moved to ASC Diaraf during the 2012–13 season, where he played for five seasons. On 29 July 2017 Niang moved to Tunisia to play for ES Métlaoui during the 2017–18 season.

On 27 July 2018, he moved to Lebanon to play with Beirut-based club Nejmeh, staying there for two years. On 1 October 2020, Niang joined Iraqi Premier League side Al-Mina'a. He moved to Al-Talaba in August 2021.

Niang joined Lebanese side Ahed in January 2026

== International career ==
Niang represented Senegal at the 2014 African Nations Championship qualification, making his senior international debut on 20 July 2013, in a 2–0 defeat to Mauritania.

== Honours ==
Diaraf

- Senegal FA Cup: 2013

Nejmeh

- Lebanese Elite Cup: 2018
- Lebanese FA Cup runner-up: 2017–18

Al-Shorta

- Iraq Stars League: 2022–23, 2023–24
- Iraqi Super Cup: 2022
