= Al-Oloom wal-Technologia SC =

Iraqi football club

Al-Oloom wal-Technologia
- Full name: Al-Oloom wal-Technologia SC
- Founded: 2011; 15 years ago
- Ground: Al-Oloom wal-Technologia Stadium
- Chairman: Thorayya Najem
- Manager: Shaker Salem
- League: Iraqi Third Division League
Home colours	Away colours

Al-Oloom wal-Technologia (Arabic: نادي العلوم والتكنولوجيا, lit. 'Science and Technology') is an Iraqi football team based in Al-Jadriya, Baghdad, that plays in Iraqi Third Division League.

== History ==
=== First female president ===
In April 2012, Mrs. Thorayya Najem was elected president of the club, becoming the first woman to hold this position as head of a sports club in Iraq.

== Managerial history ==
- (Iraq) Jumaa Judayea
- (Iraq) Abdul Karim Jassim
- (Iraq) Shaker Salem

== See also ==
- 2012–13 Iraq FA Cup
- 2013–14 Iraqi First Division League
