= Mustafa Maan =

Iraqi footballer (born 1997)

Personal information
- Full name: Mustafa Mohammed Maan Al-Ezairej
- Date of birth: 15 January 1997 (age 29)
- Place of birth: Iraq
- Height: 1.78 m (5 ft 10 in)
- Position: Defender

Team information
- Current team: Al-Najaf SC
- Number: 34

Youth career
- 2012–2013: Al-Shorta

Senior career*
Years	Team	Apps	(Gls)
2013–2017	Al-Zawraa		
2017	Amanat Baghdad		
2017–2021	Al-Quwa Al-Jawiya		(3)
2021–2023	Al-Shorta	34	(0)
2023–2024	Al-Zawraa	2	(0)
2024–	Al-Najaf	0	(0)

International career^{‡}
2013	Iraq U17	1	(0)
2016	Iraq U19	1	(0)
2020	Iraq U23	1	(0)
2021–	Iraq	1	(0)
- * Club domestic league appearances and goals as of 23 May 2024 @ 15:28(AEST) ‡ National team caps and goals as of 29 March 2021

Mustafa Mohammed Maan (born 16 January 1997) is an Iraqi footballer who plays as a left-back for Iraq Stars League club Al-Najaf.

== International career ==
On 29 March 2021, Maan made his first international cap with Iraq against Uzbekistan in a friendly match in Tashkent that ended with an Iraqi victory 1–0 over the host team.

== Honours ==
=== Club ===
Al-Zawraa

- Iraqi Premier League: 2015–16

Al-Quwa Al-Jawiya

- Iraqi Premier League: 2020–21
- Iraq FA Cup: 2020–21
- AFC Cup: 2018

Al-Shorta

- Iraqi Premier League: 2021–22, 2022–23
