= Mohammed Mezher =

Iraqi footballer

Mohammed Mezher Herez El-Ayawi
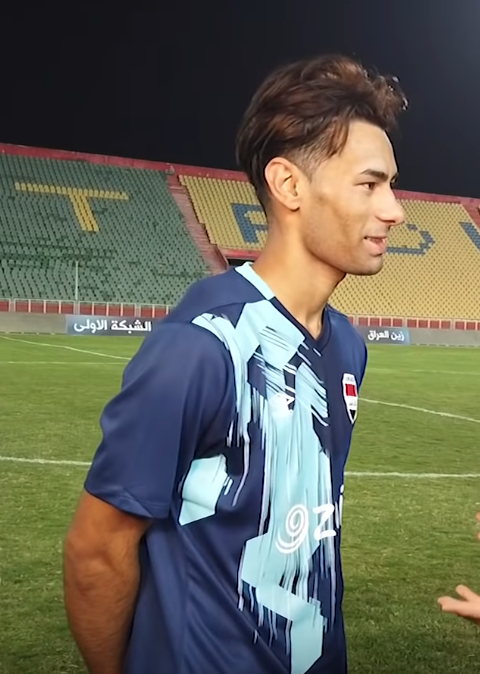

Personal information
- Date of birth: 24 March 1998 (age 28)
- Place of birth: Maysan, Iraq
- Height: 6 ft 1 in (1.85 m)
- Position: Midfielder

Team information
- Current team: Al-Karma SC

Youth career
- Naft Maysan

Senior career*
Years	Team	Apps	(Gls)
2018–2020	Naft Maysan		
2020	→ Al-Shorta (loan)	6	(0)
2020–2024	Al-Shorta	43	(1)
2023	→ Al-Najaf (loan)	12	(2)
2024-	Al-Karma SC	11	(3)

International career^{‡}
2019–	Iraq U23	8	(0)
2020–	Iraq	2	(0)
- * Club domestic league appearances and goals as of 17/12/24 @ 07:46(AEST) ‡ National team caps and goals as of 7 March 2021

Mohammed Mezher Herez El-Ayawi (Arabic: محمد مزهر; born 24 March 1998) is an Iraqi professional footballer who plays as a midfielder for Iraq Stars League club Al-Karma in the Iraqi Premier League.

== Club career ==
=== Naft Maysan ===
Mezher started his career at boyhood club Naft Maysan, where he came up the youth ranks before making his debut for the first-team in 2017 in the Iraqi Premier League.

=== Al-Shorta ===
In January 2020, after impressing for Naft Maysan in their league match against defending champions Al-Shorta as well as the Iraq U-23s at the 2020 AFC U-23 Championship, the league's defending champions signed Mezher on loan until the end of the season, alongside teammate Akram Raheem, ahead of the season restart and their 2020 AFC Champions League campaign. Mezher quickly established himself as a key player for Al-Shorta, filling the gaps left by national team stars Amjad Attwan and Safaa Hadi excellently as they headed to Kuwait and Russia, respectively, to join Kuwait SC Krylia Sovetov Samara, starting all three of Al-Shorta's league matches as well as both Champions League matches, impressing in all five before the season was cancelled due to the COVID-19 pandemic. At the end of the season, Al-Shorta made his loan deal permanent.

== International career ==
=== Iraq U-23 ===
Mezher was called up to the Iraqi olympic team in 2019, helping his country qualify for the 2020 AFC U-23 Championship, where he played all three matches.

=== Iraq ===
Following his impressive performances at the 2020 AFC U-23 Championship and his new club Al-Shorta, Mezher was called up to the senior Iraqi national team for the first time in June 2020, as the 35-man squad entered a one-month long training camp ahead of Iraq's 2022 FIFA World Cup qualification matches. On 12 November 2020, Mezher made his international debut with Iraq against Jordan in a friendly. He won his second cap for Iraq on 17 November 2020, when he captained his country to a 2-1 victory over Uzbekistan. He then got called up to the preliminary squad in March 2022 ahead of the last two games of the Third Round of qualifiers by new interim boss Abdul-Ghani Shahad.

== Honours ==
=== Club ===
Al-Shorta

- Iraq Stars League: 2021–22, 2023–24
- Iraq FA Cup: 2023–24
- Iraqi Super Cup: 2022
