= Faisal Jassim =

Iraqi footballer

Personal information
- Full name: Faisal Jasim Nafil Al Manaa
- Date of birth: 1 October 1991 (age 35)
- Place of birth: As-Samawa, Al-Muthanna
- Position: Right-back

Team information
- Current team: Al-Minaa
- Number: 24

Senior career*
Years	Team	Apps	(Gls)
2006–2008	Al-Samawa		
2008–2011	Najaf		
2011–2013	Duhok		
2013–2015	Al-Quwa Al-Jawiya		
2015–2016	Al-Minaa	22	(0)
2016–2020	Al Shorta		
2020–2021	Naft Al-Wasat		
2021–2025	Al-Shorta	105	(0)
2025–	Al-Minaa	0	(0)

International career^{‡}
2011	Iraq U23		
2015–2021	Iraq	6	(0)
- * Club domestic league appearances and goals as of 2 July 2025 ‡ National team caps and goals as of 29 March 2021

Faisal Jassim (born 1 October 1991) is an Iraqi professional footballer who plays as a right-back for Al-Minaa in the Iraq Stars League.

== International debut ==
On 17 November 2015, Faisal Jassim made his first international cap with Iraq against Chinese Taipei in a World Cup qualifier.

== Honours ==
Al-Shorta

- Iraq Stars League: 2018–19, 2021–22, 2022–23, 2023–24, 2024–25
- Iraq FA Cup: 2023–24
- Iraqi Super Cup: 2019, 2022
