= Prince Opoku Agyemang =

Ghanaian footballer (born 1992)

Personal information
- Full name: Prince Opoku Agyemang
- Date of birth: 6 June 1992 (age 34)
- Place of birth: Kumasi, Ghana
- Height: 1.80 m (5 ft 11 in)
- Position: Striker

Youth career
- 2002–2005: Masso FC
- 2005–2008: Asante Kotoko Youth

Senior career*
Years	Team	Apps	(Gls)
2008–2009	Sekondi Eleven Wise	16	(12)
2010–2012	Heart of Lions	23	(4)
2016–2019	New Edubiase United	52	(42)
2019–2022	Medeama	40	(20)
2020–2021	→ Cape Town City (loan)	7	(1)
2022	Gold Stars	15	(6)
2022–2023	Duhok SC	15	(9)
2023–2024	Mohammedan	2	(0)

International career
2019–	Ghana	1	(0)
- * Club domestic league appearances and goals as of 12:22, 19 December 2023 (UTC)

Prince Opoku Agyemang (born 6 June 1992) is a Ghanaian professional footballer who plays as a forward for I-League club Mohammedan and a former member of the Ghana Black Stars B squad.

== Club career ==
=== Early career ===
Agyemang was born in Kumasi and grew up in Asokwa, a town in under the jurisdiction of the Kumasi Metropolitan Assembly. He took his first steps in football as an unregistered player for the local club Masso FC in Asokwa which later played in the colts division in the Ashanti region. After showing scoring prospect he was signed by Asante Kotoko to their youth team in 2005. He left Kotoko to join Sekondi Eleven Wise in the 2008/09. He scored a total of 12 goals in 16 appearances and helped the club to secure promotion to the Ghana Premier League during the spell of Charles Akonnor as head coach. Heart of Lions acquired the striker and deployed him as a left-winger in the 2010/11 Ghana Premier League season where he netted 4 goals in 23 games.

=== New Edubiase United F.C ===
Following his spell at Heart of Lions he left to join Bekwai-based New Edubiase United in 2016. During his spell at the club he scored a total of 42 goals in 52 games compelling Medeama FC to sign him after netting 8 times in 10 games in the 2019 Ghanaian Premier League.

=== Medeama SC ===
After scoring 8 goals in 10 games for New Edubiase United F.C. in the 2019 Ghanaian Premier League he was signed by Medeama SC on a 3-year-contract in December 2019. He made his Ghana Premier League debut for Medeama in an away game against Cape Coast Ebusua Dwarfs at the Cape Coast Sports Stadium and marked the event by scoring a goal in a 3–1 win. On the following match day he scored a first-half brace against giants Accra Hearts of Oak at the TNA Park as Medeama scooped a 3–0 win. Agyemang struck the match-winning goal against Asante Kotoko on 15 January 2020 in the week 4 of the Ghana Premier League at the TNA Park. He scored a total of 11 goals in 14 games for Medeama before the 2019/10 season was cancelled due to the COVID-19 pandemic. Agyemang earned a call up in the Black Stars B squad and scored a total of 10 goals in 5 games for the side which was managed by Maxwell Konadu.

=== Cape Town City ===
Following his 11-goal haul for Medeama SC in the cancelled 2019/20 Ghana Premier League season the Ghanaian press reported that he has joined South African side Cape Town City FC on a season-long loan deal from Medeama.

=== Mohammedan ===
In June 2023, he signed with Indian I-League club Mohammedan Sporting.

== International career ==
Agyemang was named in the Ghana Black Stars B squad that played at the 2019 WAFU Cup of Nations in Senegal. During the preparatory matches for the tournament he scored a total of 10 goals in 5 games for the side which was managed by Maxwell Konadu. He scored a hat-trick against Tema Youth FC and a brace against Division One League side Young Apostles.

== Honours ==
Ghana

- 2019 WAFU Cup of Nations – runner-up

Mohammedan

- I-League: 2023–24
