= Bassam Shakir =

Iraqi footballer

Personal information
- Full name: Bassam Shakir Ahmed Ahmed
- Date of birth: 17 May 2000 (age 26)
- Place of birth: Baghdad, Iraq
- Height: 1.77 m (5 ft 10 in)
- Positions: Winger; second striker

Team information
- Current team: Al-Shorta
- Number: 11

Senior career*
Years	Team	Apps	(Gls)
2016–2017	Al-Karkh		(1)
2017–2021	Al-Naft		
2021–	Al-Shorta	151	(16)

International career^{‡}
2021–	Iraq	2	(0)
- * Club domestic league appearances and goals as of 2 June 2026 ‡ National team caps and goals as of 29 May 2021

Bassam Shakir (born 17 May 2000) is an Iraqi footballer who plays as a winger for Al-Shorta in the Iraqi Premier League and the Iraq national team.

== International career ==
On 24 May 2021, Bassam Shakir made his first international cap with Iraq against Tajikistan in a friendly.

== Honours ==
=== Club ===
Al-Shorta

- Iraq Stars League: 2021–22, 2022–23, 2023–24, 2024–25
- Iraq FA Cup: 2023–24

=== Individual ===
- Iraq Stars League Goal of the Season: 2023–24
