= Manaf Younis =

Iraqi footballer

Personal information
- Full name: Manaf Younis Hashim Al-Tekreeti
- Date of birth: 16 November 1996 (age 29)
- Place of birth: Tikrit, Iraq
- Height: 1.90 m (6 ft 3 in)
- Position: Centre-back

Team information
- Current team: Duhok
- Number: 2

Senior career*
Years	Team	Apps	(Gls)
2016–2018	Salahaddin		
2019–2022	Al-Karkh		(3)
2020	→ Al-Shorta (loan)	0	(0)
2022–2026	Al-Shorta	105	(4)
2026–	Duhok	5	(0)

International career^{‡}
2021–	Iraq	35	(1)
- * Club domestic league appearances and goals as of 16 September 2026 ‡ National team caps and goals as of 27 July 2026

Manaf Younus Hashim Al-Tekreeti (Arabic: مَنَاف يُونُس هَاشِم التِّكرِيْتِيّ; born 16 November 1996) is an Iraqi professional footballer who plays as a centre-back for Iraq Stars League club Duhok and the Iraq national team.

Younis scored the winner in the 123rd minute of the 25th Arabian Gulf Cup final, handing Iraq the trophy over Oman.

== Club career ==
=== Early life and career ===
Manaf was born in Tikrit, in the Saladin Governorate. His father died when Younis was 8 years old, and he was raised by his mother and older brother. He started his career in Salahaddin SC, where he impressed with his strength and aerial ability, which led to him often being deployed as striker. He made his debut in the first round of the 2016–17 Iraq FA Cup, scoring after 46 seconds against Al-Mohandessin SC. He spent two and a half seasons with his hometown club, before moving to Al-Karkh

=== Al-Karkh ===
On January 23, 2019, Al-Karkh SC announced the signing of Manaf Younis. He was part of the team as the club finished an impressive 6th position in the league in his first season. In March 2020 Manaf signed for Al-Shorta on loan until the end of the season., however, that season was abanoded due to the COVID-19 virus.

In December 2020, Younis scored his first goal for Al-Karkh, rescuing a point in his team's 2–2 draw with Al-Mina'a SC.

Younis helped the team win the 2021–22 Iraq FA Cup, he started the final as Al-Karkh beat Al-Kahrabaa to win their first ever title.

=== Al-Shorta ===
Ahead of the 2022–2023 season, Younis returned to Al-Shorta in a deal worth 360 Million Iraqi Dinars. He scored a winning goal in December against his former club Al-Karkh, in the 93rd minute to win the match 3–2. Younis played 31 league matches for Al-Shorta in his first season with the club en route to winning the Iraqi league title.

Younis renewed his contract with Al-Shorta ahead of the 2023–2024 season. Younis suffered a hand injury which required surgery in November, during a league match against Erbil SC. Younis missed several matches due to injury, but returned in late September. He was once again a crucial figure in the squad that season, as the club went on to win the league, and the cup with the defender playing in 28 matches throughout the season.

== International career ==
In November 2021, Younis was called up to Iraq as part of their 2021 FIFA Arab Cup squad. He made his debut in the starting line-up for the national team in their opening match against Oman.

Younis was called up to the Iraqi squad for the 25th Arabian Gulf Cup. January 19, 2023, he scored his first international goal in the stoppage time of extra-time in a 3–2 win over Oman in the final, to earn his country their first title in the competition since 1988.

Younis was called up to the FIFA World Cup qualifying matches against Jordan and Oman. He started the match against Jordan, helping the team to a clean sheet in a 0–0 draw.

== Career ==
=== International goals ===
No.	Date	Venue	Opponent	Score	Result	Competition
1.	19 January 2023	Basra International Stadium, Basra, Iraq	Oman	3–2	3–2 (a.e.t.)	25th Arabian Gulf Cup

== Honours ==
Al-Karkh

- Iraq FA Cup: 2021–22

Al-Shorta

- Iraq Stars League: 2022–23, 2023–24, 2024–25
- Iraq FA Cup: 2023–24
- Iraqi Super Cup: 2022

Iraq

- Arabian Gulf Cup: 2023
