= Karrar Amer =

Iraqi footballer

Personal information
- Date of birth: 16 October 1994 (age 32)
- Place of birth: Iraq
- Position: Centre-back

Team information
- Current team: Al-Talaba SC

Senior career*
Years	Team	Apps	(Gls)
2013–2014	Al-Shamiya		
2014–2015	Al-Diwaniya		
2016–2020	Al-Najaf		
2017–2018	→ Al-Minaa (loan)	10	(0)
2020–2024	Al-Shorta	78	(5)
2023	→ Al-Najaf (loan)		
2024	Al-Nasr		
2024-	Al-Talaba SC	11	(0)

International career^{‡}
2022–	Iraq	1	(0)
- * Club domestic league appearances and goals as of 23/12/24 @ 04:47(AEST) ‡ National team caps and goals as of 29 May 2021

Karrar Amer (Arabic: كَرَّار عَامِر; born 16 October 1994) is an Iraqi footballer who plays as a centre-back for Al-Nasr in the Kuwait Premier League.

== International career ==
On 23 September 2022, Amer made his first international cap with Iraq against Oman in the 2022 Jordan International Tournament.

== Honours ==
=== Club ===
Al-Shorta

- Iraq Stars League: 2021–22, 2023–24
- Iraq FA Cup: 2023–24
- Iraqi Super Cup: 2022
