= Fahd Youssef =

Syrian footballer (born 1987)

Fahd Youssef فَهْد يُوسُف
Personal information
- Full name: Fahd Youssef
- Date of birth: 15 May 1987 (age 39)
- Place of birth: Qamishli, Syria
- Height: 1.70 m (5 ft 7 in)
- Position: Winger

Team information
- Current team: Al-Minaa
- Number: 30

Youth career
- Al-Jehad

Senior career*
Years	Team	Apps	(Gls)
2006–2011	Al-Jehad		
2011–2015	That Ras	68	(12)
2015–2017	Al-Jazeera	39	(6)
2017–2018	Al-Wehdat	22	(3)
2018–2019	Al-Sailiya	22	(1)
2019–2021	Al-Wehdat		
2019–2020	→ Hutteen (loan)		
2021–2025	Al-Shorta	146	(5)
2026	Al-Shorta	20	(0)
2026–	Al-Minaa	0	(0)

International career^{‡}
2015–	Syria	44	(7)
- * Club domestic league appearances and goals as of 2 June 2026 ‡ National team caps and goals as of 6 June 2024

Fahd Youssef (Arabic: فَهْد يُوسُف; born 15 May 1987) is a Syrian football player who plays for Al-Minaa in the Iraq Stars League.

== International career ==
Youssef made his debut with Syria aged 27 against Singapore in the 2018 FIFA World Cup qualifiers.

== Honours ==
=== Club ===
Al-Shorta

- Iraq Stars League: 2021–22, 2022–23, 2023–24, 2024–25
- Iraq FA Cup: 2023–24
- Iraqi Super Cup: 2022

=== Individual ===
October player in the Iraqi Premier League 2022-23
