= Aso Rostam =

Iraqi footballer

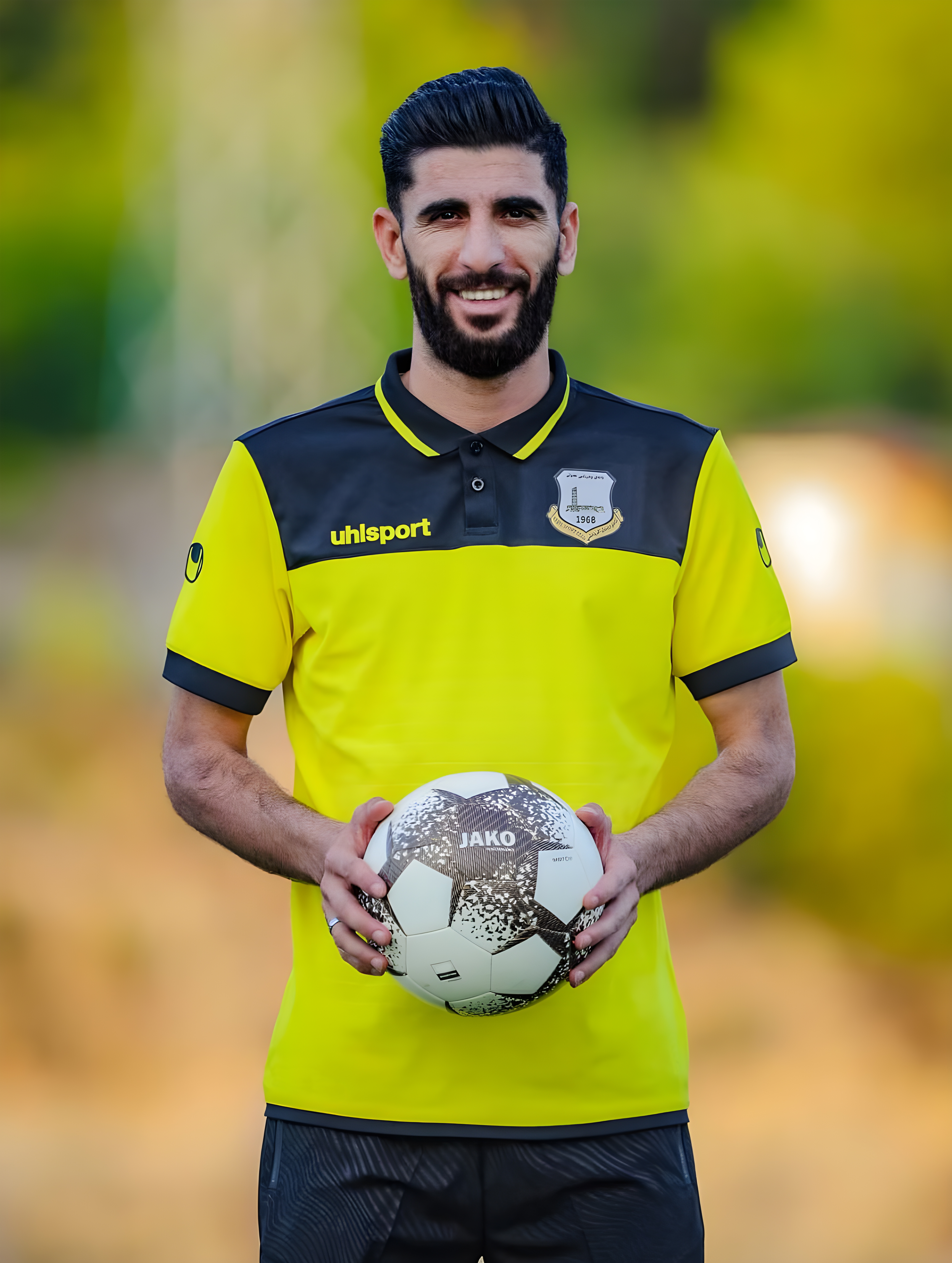

Personal information
- Date of birth: 1 December 1994 (age 31)
- Place of birth: Sharazur, Iraq
- Position: Forward

Team information
- Current team: Duhok
- Number: 25

Youth career
- Newroz
- Sulaymaniya

Senior career*
Years	Team	Apps	(Gls)
–2015	Sulaymaniya		
2015–2018	Peshmerga Sulaymaniya		
2018	Karbala		
2018–2019	Newroz		
2019–2020	Erbil		(4)
2020–2021	Newroz		
2021	Duhok		
2021–2022	Newroz		
2022–2023	Al-Salmiya		(9)
2023–2024	Al-Shorta	20	(7)
2023–2024	→ Erbil (loan)		
2024	→ Esteghlal Khuzestan (loan)	11	(2)
2024–2026	Newroz		
2026	Zakho		(8)
2026	Duhok		(8)

International career
2022–	Iraq	7	(1)
- * Club domestic league appearances and goals as of 10 September 2024

Aso Rostam Mohammed (Kurdish: ئاسۆ ڕۆستەم, romanized: Aso Řostem; Arabic: ْآسوّ رُّستَم; born 1 December 1994) is a Kurdish Iraqi footballer who plays as a forward for Iraqi club Duhok Sport Club and the Iraq national team.

== International career ==
On 23 September 2022, Aso Rostam made his first international appearance with the Iraqi national team against Oman in the 2022 Jordan International Tournament. In 2023, Aso was part of the Iraqi Squad that won the 25th Arabian Gulf Cup on home soil. He scored his first international goal against Saudi Arabia in the Group stage phase of that tournament.

== Career statistics ==
=== International goals ===
Scores and results list Iraq's goal tally first.

No	Date	Venue	Opponent	Score	Result	Competition
1.	9 January 2023	Basra International Stadium, Basra	Saudi Arabia	2–0	2–0	25th Arabian Gulf Cup

== Honours ==
Al-Shorta

- Iraqi Premier League: 2022–23

Iraq

- Arabian Gulf Cup: 2023
