= Al-Madina Stadium =

Football stadium in Baghdad, Iraq

Al-Madina International Stadium
- ملعب المدينة الدولي
- Interactive map of Al-Madina International Stadium
- Full name: Al-Madina International Stadium
- Location: Port Said Street, Baghdad 10059, Iraq
- Coordinates: 33°21′15.8″N 44°27′20.1″E
- Owner: Government of Iraq
- Capacity: 32,000
- Surface: Mixto Hybrid Grass Technology
- Scoreboard: Yes
- Field size: 105 by 68 metres (114.8 yd × 74.4 yd)

Construction
- Built: 2012–2014, 2018–2019
- Opened: 1 December 2021
- Cost: $100 Million
- Services engineers: Nurol İnşaat & Global Sport IQ
- Main contractor: Global Sport IQ

Tenant
- Iraq national football team (selected matches)

Al-Madina International Stadium (Arabic: ملعب المدينة الدولي, lit. 'City Stadium') is a football stadium in Baghdad, Iraq. It is Iraq's first-ever stadium solar power plant, and the second in the Middle East of its kind.

Construction work for the stadium was completed on 18 December 2019; it can accommodate over 32,000 spectators.

== History ==
=== Construction ===
Al-Madina International Stadium's construction started in 2 July 2012 and the construction was at an overall cost of $100 million funded by the government of Iraq. It is a grass surfaced football arena with a total area of 30,000 m^{2}. It can accommodate up to 32,000 spectators, and has other sports-related facilities. It was designed and built by Nurol Construction. It is owned by the Federal government of Iraq.

=== Name ===
The stadium has changed its name four times. It was called "Al-Sadr City Stadium", before the Ministry of Youth and Sports decided in 2017 to name it "Al-Habibiya Stadium" in reference to the stadium's location. In early December 2019, the name "Al-Shohada Stadium" was chosen as a tribute to the martyrs of the Tishreen Revolution. The final name change came in August 2020, when the stadium took the name of "Al-Madina Stadium", meaning "City Stadium", in reference to the Sadr City district in which the stadium is located.

=== Inauguration ===
It was scheduled to be inaugurated in early 2020, but the unprecedented situation linked to the global health crisis forced the Iraqi authorities to postpone the opening to 2021 despite the fact that works have been completed since 2019. The stadium finally hosted its first match on 1 December 2021, the final of the 2021 WAFF U-18 Championship between Iraq and Lebanon. Iraq won on penalties after the game had tied 0–0 after regulation time.

The first-ever international goal at this stadium belongs to Iraqi striker Alaa Abbas, who scored with a bicycle kick in the 17th minute against Uganda in a friendly on 21 January 2022.

== Facilities ==
=== Hybrid grass ===
The stadium's field meets the FIFA regulation size of 105 m × 68 m (344 ft × 223 ft), and consists of a hybrid grass surface. The pitch is made of Mixto hybrid grass imported from Italy. It is the same technology used for the Santiago Bernabéu Stadium's turf in Madrid. Mixto Hybrid Grass Technology consists of a completely natural grass, rooted in a patented synthetic substrate composed of cork granules, synthetic microfibers and fine sand. The synthetic microfibers reinforce the rooting of the grass and allow it to be more resistant. The cork granules absorb shocks and reduce the risk of injury to players.

Anecdotally, Al-Madina Stadium broke the record for the fastest turf laying of a football pitch by completing it in 2 hours 24 minutes. The previous record was 9 hours 15 minutes and held by Al Janoub Stadium.

=== Solar power ===
The facility is one of the first of its kind in the Middle East. The roof of the stadium is equipped with large areas of solar panels on the north and south sides, forming a 7,000 square meter power plant with a voltage of 1,200 kV. This makes the stadium self-sufficient in terms of energy supply for its various compartments and the lighting of the field. When photovoltaic production is higher than the loads consumption, the excess power is distributed to residents in the nearby area of the stadium.

=== Video Assistant Referee Technology ===
Al-Madina International Stadium is the first ever stadium in Iraq to incorporate Video assistant referee (VAR) technology. It was installed in the venue on 15 March 2022.

== Events ==
- 2021 – WAFF U-18 Championship Final
- 2022 – Iraq FA Cup Final
- 2022 – Iraqi Super Cup
- 2023 - WAFF U-23 Championship

== See also ==
- List of football stadiums in Iraq
