= Moamen Soliman =

Egyptian football manager (born 1974)

Personal information
- Full name: Moamen Soliman Yahia
- Date of birth: 21 March 1974 (age 52)
- Place of birth: Cairo, Egypt
- Position: Left-back

Team information
- Current team: Al-Karma (head coach)

Senior career*
Years	Team	Apps	(Gls)
1995–1998	Zamalek		
1998–1999	Suez Club		
1999–2000	De Graafschap		
2000–2001	OFI		
2001–2002	Agios Nikolaos		

Managerial career
- 2012: ENPPI (assistant)
- 2013: Petrojet (assistant)
- 2013–2014: Shaab Ibb
- 2014–2015: Nogoom El-Mostakbal
- 2015: El-Entag El-Harby
- 2015–2016: El-Assiouty
- 2016: Zamalek
- 2017: Smouha
- 2017: Misr Lel Makkasa
- 2018: Al-Shoulla
- 2018–2019: Petrojet
- 2019: Nogoom
- 2020–2021: Egypt U17
- 2021–2023: Al-Shorta
- 2023: Al-Quwa Al-Jawiya
- 2023–2024: Al-Ittihad Tripoli
- 2024: Al-Shorta
- 2024–2025: Al-Ahly Benghazi
- 2025–2026: Al-Shorta
- 2026–: Al-Karma
- * Club domestic league appearances and goals

Moamen Soliman Yahia (Arabic: مُؤْمِن سُلَيْمَان يَحْيَى; born 21 March 1974) is an Egyptian football manager and former player who manages Al-Karma in the Iraq Stars League. He played as a left-back for Zamalek SC and Suez Club in Egypt, for De Graafschap in the Netherlands, and for OFI and Agios Nikolaos in Greece.

== Managerial career ==
=== El-Entag El-Harby ===
Soliman was appointed manager of El-Entag El-Harby in 2015. He made a big impact after winning the Egyptian Second Division in 2014–15 season and reached first division.

=== Zamalek ===
Soliman took Zamalek command position as a caretaker, his first match was against Ismaily (Semi-Final of 2016 Egyptian cup), Zamalek did a great performance and won 4–0, his second match was the cup final against Al Ahly, he led the team to win 3–1 and claim the fourth cup title in a row.

He also led the team to the 2016 CAF Champions League Final against Mamelodi Sundowns before the team lose by 3–1 in aggregate.

=== Al-Shorta ===
On 15 August 2021, Soliman is appointed as the head coach of Al-Shorta, evolving in the Iraqi Premier League. It is the first foreign team he has coached. In the 2021–22 season, Soliman succeeds with Al-Shorta in setting a record for the earliest league title win (seven rounds remaining). This achievement earned him a contract extension.

== Managerial statistics ==
As of 22 February 2025

Team	Nat	From	To	Record				
Team	Nat	From	To	G	W	D	L	Win %
Nogoom FC	(Egypt)	1 October 2014	3 March 2015	18	7	8	3	38.89
El Entag El Harby SC	(Egypt)	3 March 2015	22 July 2015	12	6	4	2	50.00
Alassiouty SC	(Egypt)	9 December 2015	28 July 2016	16	12	4	0	75.00
Zamalek	(Egypt)	28 July 2016	19 November 2016	12	9	1	2	75.00
Smouha	(Egypt)	2 January 2017	20 July 2017	29	12	10	7	41.38
Misr Lel Makkasa	(Egypt)	3 August 2017	21 October 2017	6	1	1	4	16.67
Petrojet	(Egypt)	13 November 2018	31 January 2019	9	2	2	5	22.22
Nogoom FC	(Egypt)	27 February 2019	20 April 2019	5	0	4	1	0.00
Egypt U-17	(Egypt)	29 December 2020	15 August 2021	0	0	0	0	—
Al-Shorta SC	(Iraq)	16 August 2021	19 March 2023	61	42	13	6	68.85
Al-Quwa Al-Jawiya	(Iraq)	19 April 2023	5 August 2023	19	13	4	2	68.42
Al-Ittihad Club (Tripoli)	(Libya)	27 September 2023	17 February 2024	6	3	1	2	50.00
Al-Shorta SC	(Iraq)	2 march 2024	July 2024	20	14	6	0	70.00
Al-Ahly Benghazi	(Libya)	1 October 2024	Current	11	9	1	1	81.82
Total				221	129	59	33	58.37

== Honours ==
=== Player ===
Zamalek

- African Cup of Champions Clubs: 1996
- CAF Super Cup: 1997

=== Manager ===
El-Entag El-Harby

- Egyptian Second Division: 2014–15 (reached first division)

Zamalek

- Egypt Cup: 2016

Al-Shorta

- Iraq Stars League: 2021–22, 2023–24, 2024–25
- Iraq FA Cup: 2023–24
- Iraqi Super Cup: 2022

Al-Quwa Al-Jawiya

- Iraq FA Cup: 2022–23
