= Al-Najaf International Stadium =

Stadium in Iraq

Al-Najaf Stadium ملعب النجف الدولي
- Interactive map of Al-Najaf Stadium ملعب النجف الدولي
- Full name: Al Najaf International Stadium
- Location: Najaf, Iraq
- Coordinates: 32°03′54″N 44°18′58″E
- Owner: Ministry of Youth and Sports (Iraq)
- Operator: Al-Najaf FC
- Capacity: 30,000
- Surface: Grass
- Scoreboard: Yes
- Field size: 105 m × 68 m

Construction
- Groundbreaking: 22 May 2011
- Opened: 5 May 2018
- Cost: $83.75 million USD
- Architect: 360 Architecture / HOK
- Services engineer: Anwar Soura General Contracting Company
- Main contractor: Anwar Soura General Contracting Company

Tenants
- Al-Najaf FC; Naft Al-Wasat SC

Al-Najaf International Stadium (Arabic: ملعب النجف الدولي) is a stadium in Najaf, Iraq, which opened on 5 May 2018. It is used mostly for football matches, and serves as the home stadium of Al-Najaf FC and Naft Al-Wasat SC. The stadium has a capacity of 30,000 spectators. Construction, which cost US$83.75 million, was funded entirely by the Iraqi government.

== Design ==
The final design by Kansas City-based 360 Architecture won the competition, and was selected by the Iraqi Ministry of Youth and Sports. The first proposed design included an athletics track, but it was agreed to construct a football-specific stadium. The sports complex also contains two additional stadiums, accommodating 400 and 2,000 spectators, mainly used for training. The religious ornaments and mosaics on the outer façade are inspired by Imam Ali's mosque which is 10 km from the stadium.

== Prix Versailles 2019 ==
Al Najaf International Stadium has been nominated among five other finalists to win the 2019 Prix Versailles for the most beautiful sporting facility in the world (architecture and design). The committee considered various criteria including innovation, creativeness, attention to landscaping, recognition of local, natural and cultural patrimony, and environmental efficiency. The importance of social interaction and participation were also part of the assessment criteria.

== See also ==
- List of football stadiums in Iraq
