= Al-Fayhaa Stadium (Basra) =

Stadium in Basra, Iraq

Al-Fayhaa Stadium ملعب الفيحاء
- Mohamed Musbah Al‑Waeli Stadium
- Interactive map of Al-Fayhaa Stadium ملعب الفيحاء
- Full name: Al-Fayhaa Stadium
- Location: Basra, Iraq
- Coordinates: 30°26′33″N 47°46′47″E
- Owner: Government of Iraq
- Capacity: 10,000
- Surface: Track & Field (Grass)
- Scoreboard: Yes
- Field size: 105 by 68 metres (115 by 74 yd)

Construction
- Built: 2009–2013
- Opened: 12 October 2013
- Architect: 360 Architecture And Newport Global
- Project manager: Newport Global
- Structural engineer: Thornton Tomasetti

Tenants
- Al-Minaa; Naft Al-Basra

Al-Fayhaa Stadium (Arabic: ملعب الفيحاء), also known as Mohamed Musbah Al‑Waeli Stadium, is a multi-purpose stadium in Basra, Southern Iraq. The stadium is part of the much larger Basra Sports City complex, and is surrounded by football training pitches, four Five Star hotels and other sports-related facilities. It is currently used mostly for football matches and also has facilities for athletics. The stadium has an official capacity of 10,000 spectators. It is owned by the Government of Iraq.

It hosts Naft Al-Basra and Al-Minaa football matches in the Iraqi League when attendance is low. For crucial confrontations, it is the main stadium of Basra (65,000) that welcomes the games.

== Certificate ==
The stadium obtained the IAAF Class 1 Certificate.

== Name ==
Initially, the stadium had no specific name other than Basra Sports City Secondary Stadium. Later, it was agreed to rename it Al-Fayhaa Stadium in reference to the nickname of the city Al Basra. This name is still used officially.

In 2019, the Ministry of Youth and Sports introduced a new appellation Mohamed Musbah Al-Waeli Stadium as a tribute to the ex-mayor of Al Basra who was a main figure in the elaboration of the Basra Sports City complex.

== See also ==
- List of football stadiums in Iraq
