= 2021–22 Iraqi Premier League =

Iraqi Premier League
- Season: 2021–22
- Dates: 20 September 2021 – 3 July 2022
- Champions: Al-Shorta (5th title)
- Relegated: Amanat Baghdad; Al-Minaa; Samarra
- Arab Club Champions Cup: Al-Shorta; Al-Quwa Al-Jawiya
- Matches: 380
- Goals: 766 (2.02 per match)
- Top goalscorer: Mahmoud Al-Mawas (22 goals)
- Biggest home win: Al-Diwaniya 7–0 Samarra (19 May 2022)
- Biggest away win: Al-Najaf 0–4 Naft Al-Basra (20 October 2021)
- Highest scoring: Al-Diwaniya 7–0 Samarra (19 May 2022)
- Longest winning run: 10 matches Al-Shorta
- Longest unbeaten run: 25 matches Al-Shorta
- Longest winless run: 22 matches Samarra
- Longest losing run: 7 matches Samarra

The 2021–22 Iraqi Premier League was the 48th season of the Iraqi Premier League, the highest tier football league in Iraq, since its establishment in 1974. The season started on 20 September 2021 and ended on 3 July 2022, with the relegation play-off held on 10 September 2022.

Al-Shorta secured the title with seven rounds of the league remaining, setting a new record for the earliest title win in Iraq and finishing a record 21 points clear at the top of the table. Al-Shorta also became the first club to beat all other teams in a 20-team season and the first club to win all Baghdad derbies home and away in one season.

Al-Shorta forward Mahmoud Al-Mawas from Syria became the first non-Iraqi player to win the league's top scorer award, scoring 22 goals, and the club's Egyptian manager Moamen Soliman became the first manager from Africa to win the Iraqi Premier League.

== Teams ==
Locations of the 2021–22 Iraqi Premier League teams

=== Clubs and locations ===
Team	Manager	Location	Stadium	Capacity
Al-Diwaniya	(Jordan) Haitham Al-Shboul	Diwaniya	Al-Diwaniya Stadium	5,000
Al-Kahrabaa	(Iraq) Luay Salah	Baghdad	Al-Taji Stadium	5,000
Al-Karkh	(Iraq) Ahmed Abdul-Jabar	Baghdad	Al-Saher Ahmed Radhi Stadium	5,150
Al-Minaa	(Iraq) Ali Wahab	Basra	Al-Fayhaa Stadium	10,000
Al-Naft	(Iraq) Basim Qasim	Baghdad	Al-Naft Stadium	3,000
Al-Najaf	(Iraq) Hassan Ahmed	Najaf	Al-Najaf International Stadium	30,000
Al-Qasim	(Iraq) Chasib Sultan	Babil	Al-Kifl Stadium	10,000
Al-Quwa Al-Jawiya	(Iraq) Qahtan Chathir	Baghdad	Al-Shaab Stadium	34,200
Al-Shorta	(Egypt) Moamen Soliman	Baghdad	Al-Shaab Stadium	34,200
Al-Sinaa	(Iraq) Sadeq Hanoon	Baghdad	Al-Sinaa Stadium	10,000
Al-Talaba	(Syria) Anas Makhlouf	Baghdad	Al-Shaab Stadium	34,200
Al-Zawraa	(Iraq) Ayoub Odisho	Baghdad	Al-Zawraa Stadium	15,443
Amanat Baghdad	(Iraq) Wissam Talib	Baghdad	Amanat Baghdad Stadium	5,000
Erbil	(Syria) Nizar Mahrous	Erbil	Franso Hariri Stadium	25,000
Naft Al-Basra	(Iraq) Asaad Abdul-Razzaq	Basra	Al-Fayhaa Stadium	10,000
Naft Al-Wasat	(Iraq) Abdul-Ghani Shahad	Najaf	Al-Najaf International Stadium	30,000
Naft Maysan	(Iraq) Ahmed Khalaf	Amara	Maysan Olympic Stadium	25,000
Newroz	(Iraq) Wali Kareem	Sulaymaniya	Sulaymaniya Stadium	15,000
Samarra	(Iraq) Muayad Taha	Samarra	Samarra Stadium	4,000
Zakho	(Syria) Firas Al-Khatib	Zakho	Zakho International Stadium	20,000

== League table ==
Pos	Team	Pld	W	D	L	GF	GA	GD	Pts	Qualification or relegation
1	Al-Shorta (C)	38	28	7	3	64	21	+43	91	Qualification for the Arab Club Champions Cup group stage
2	Al-Quwa Al-Jawiya	38	20	10	8	50	31	+19	70	Qualification for the Arab Club Champions Cup first qualifying round
3	Al-Talaba	38	20	9	9	54	33	+21	69	
4	Al-Naft	38	16	16	6	38	20	+18	64 (Note: Al-Naft finished ahead of Naft Al-Wasat on head-to-head points: Al-Naft 1–1 Naft Al-Wasat, Naft Al-Wasat 0–2 Al-Naft.)	
5	Naft Al-Wasat	38	17	13	8	50	36	+14	64	
6	Al-Zawraa	38	15	16	7	40	27	+13	61	
7	Al-Najaf	38	15	12	11	40	35	+5	57	
8	Newroz	38	14	9	15	40	43	−3	51	
9	Al-Kahrabaa	38	13	11	14	36	37	−1	50	
10	Zakho	38	11	15	12	35	33	+2	48	
11	Erbil	38	12	11	15	37	42	−5	47	
12	Naft Maysan	38	10	16	12	30	34	−4	46 (Note: Naft Maysan finished ahead of Naft Al-Basra on head-to-head points: Naft Maysan 4–1 Naft Al-Basra, Naft Al-Basra 0–1 Naft Maysan.)	
13	Naft Al-Basra	38	11	13	14	38	40	−2	46	
14	Al-Karkh	38	8	19	11	32	36	−4	43	
15	Al-Qasim	38	8	17	13	34	50	−16	41 (Note: Al-Qasim finished ahead of Al-Sinaa on head-to-head points: Al-Qasim 0–0 Al-Sinaa, Al-Sinaa 0–1 Al-Qasim.)	
16	Al-Sinaa	38	8	17	13	30	37	−7	41	
17	Al-Diwaniya	38	10	9	19	33	51	−18	39 (Note: Al-Diwaniya finished ahead of Amanat Baghdad on head-to-head points: Al-Diwaniya 2–0 Amanat Baghdad, Amanat Baghdad 0–1 Al-Diwaniya.)	
18	Amanat Baghdad (R)	38	9	12	17	32	41	−9	39	Qualification for the relegation play-off
19	Al-Minaa (R)	38	3	21	14	33	49	−16	30	Relegation to the Iraqi First Division League
20	Samarra (R)	38	1	9	28	20	70	−50	12	Relegation to the Iraqi First Division League

Source: IPFL
Rules for classification: 1) points; 2) head-to-head points; 3) head-to-head goal difference; 4) goal difference; 5) number of wins; 6) number of goals scored.
(C) Champions; (R) Relegated

== Results ==
Home \ Away	DIW	KAH	KAR	MIN	NFT	NJF	QSM	QWJ	SHR	SIN	TLB	ZWR	AMN	ERB	NFB	NFW	NFM	NRZ	SMR	ZAK
Al-Diwaniya		1–1	0–1	1–0	0–0	0–2	1–1	2–1	1–1	1–2	0–3 (Note: The Al-Diwaniya–Al-Talaba match originally ended 1–1 but was changed to a 3–0 win for Al-Talaba due to Al-Diwaniya fielding the ineligible player Omar Jabbar.)	0–0	2–0	3–1	0–2	0–2	2–1	1–0	7–0	2–2
Al-Kahrabaa	2–0		1–3	1–0	0–1	2–0	3–1	2–3	0–2	2–2	0–1	0–0	2–1	0–0	2–1	1–2	0–0	1–0	2–0	0–0
Al-Karkh	1–0	1–0		1–1	1–2	1–1	2–2	1–1	0–1	0–0	1–2	0–0	2–1	0–0	1–2	0–1	1–0	1–1	1–1	0–1
Al-Minaa	3–0	3–1	0–0		0–0	1–1	2–2	1–1	1–1	0–1	1–1	1–1	1–1	0–0	0–1	3–3	1–2	1–1	1–1	0–2
Al-Naft	1–0	0–1	0–0	4–1		1–2	3–0	0–0	0–1	1–1	1–0	2–2	1–0	2–0	0–0	1–1	0–0	3–1	1–0	0–0
Al-Najaf	3–0 (Note: The Al-Najaf–Al-Diwaniya match was awarded as a 3–0 win to Al-Najaf as Al-Diwaniya were not allowed to play the match due to having not paid their outstanding financial payments to players as required by the league's licensing criteria.)	0–0	1–1	2–2	0–1		2–1	1–0	0–0	0–0	1–3	2–2	1–0	0–0	0–4	1–1	1–0	0–1	2–0	1–1
Al-Qasim	1–0	1–0	2–2	2–1	0–0	1–0		1–1	0–3	0–0	1–2	0–0	0–0	1–1	3–2	1–1	0–0	1–1	1–1	2–1
Al-Quwa Al-Jawiya	3–0	2–0	1–0	2–1	0–1	2–1	1–0		0–2	1–1	2–1	2–2	2–1	2–1	2–1	3–1	2–0	2–0	2–0	1–0
Al-Shorta	2–1	0–0	1–2	3–1	1–0	1–0	0–0	1–0		1–0	1–0	2–0	2–0	2–2	2–0	3–0	2–0	2–3	3–0	3–2
Al-Sinaa	0–0	0–1	3–0	1–0	0–0	0–2	0–1	1–1	0–1		0–1	0–1	1–2	2–0	1–1	0–0	1–1	1–0	1–0	1–1
Al-Talaba	3–0	2–2	0–0	0–0	3–1	1–0	1–1	3–0	0–1	3–1		2–0	2–2	1–0	3–2	2–3	2–2	1–0	3–1	2–1
Al-Zawraa	2–0	2–1	2–1	1–1	1–2	1–2	3–0	1–1	1–2	1–0	0–1		2–1	1–0	2–1	2–0	0–0	2–1	0–0	2–0
Amanat Baghdad	0–1	0–2	0–0	0–1	2–2	2–1	3–0	0–0	1–3	1–1	0–1	1–1		1–1	0–0	0–1	0–0	1–0	2–0	1–1
Erbil	4–2	1–0	2–1	3–0	0–0	0–0	1–0	0–1	0–1	2–1	2–1	1–0	1–2		1–2	0–2	2–0	4–0	2–1	1–3
Naft Al-Basra	2–1	1–1	0–0	3–1	1–0	2–3	0–1	1–0	1–3	0–0	0–0	0–0	0–2	1–1		1–1	0–1	2–0	2–1	0–0
Naft Al-Wasat	2–0	1–1	2–2	2–0	0–2	0–1	4–1	2–1	2–1	1–2	2–2	0–0	2–0	3–0	1–0		0–0	2–0	1–0	0–2
Naft Maysan	1–1	2–0	0–0	1–1	1–1	0–2	1–0	1–2	0–2	3–1	1–0	0–3	0–1	1–1	4–1	0–2		1–1	2–1	3–0 (Note: The Naft Maysan–Zakho match was awarded as a 3–0 win to Naft Maysan, as Zakho did not turn up for the game.)
Newroz	0–1	2–1	2–1	1–1	0–0	2–1	3–2	0–3 (Note: The Newroz–Al-Quwa Al-Jawiya match was not played due to the entry of Newroz fans into the stadium which violated COVID-19 restrictions, and was later awarded as a 3–0 win to Al-Quwa Al-Jawiya.)	2–3	4–1	1–0	0–0	2–0	1–0	0–0	1–0	0–0		2–0	1–0
Samarra	0–0	1–2	2–3	1–1	0–3	1–2	3–2	0–2	0–3	1–1	0–1	0–1	0–2	1–2	0–0	2–2	0–1	1–3		0–1
Zakho	1–2	0–1	0–0	0–0	0–1	0–1	1–1	0–0	1–1	2–2	2–0	0–1	2–1	1–0	2–1	0–0	0–0	2–1	3–0 (Note: The Zakho–Samarra match was awarded as a 3–0 win to Zakho, as Samarra did not turn up for the game.)	

Source: IPFL
Legend: Blue = home team win; Yellow = draw; Red = away team win.

== Relegation play-off ==
10 September 2022
18:00 UTC+03:00

Amanat Baghdad	0–2	Duhok
		Agyemang 15'; Delli 81'

Al-Madina Stadium, Baghdad
Referee: Ahmed Kadhim

Duhok are promoted to the Iraqi Premier League, while Amanat Baghdad are relegated to the Iraqi First Division League.

== Season statistics ==
=== Top scorers ===
Rank	Player	Club	Goals
1	(Syria) Mahmoud Al-Mawas	Al-Shorta	22
2	(Iraq) Aso Rostam	Newroz	18
3	(Iraq) Muhaimen Salim	Al-Kahrabaa	13
4	(Iraq) Hammadi Ahmed	Al-Quwa Al-Jawiya	12
4	(Iraq) Mohannad Abdul-Raheem	Naft Al-Wasat	12

=== Hat-tricks ===
Player	For	Against	Result	Date
(Iraq) Farhan Shakor	Amanat Baghdad	Al-Qasim	3–0 (H)	20 April 2022

Notes

(H) – Home team

== Awards ==
Award	Winner	Club
Soccer Iraq Goal of the Season	(Iraq) Alaa Abbas	Al-Quwa Al-Jawiya
