= Newroz SC =

Iraqi football club

- Full name: Newroz Sports Club
- Nickname: A City's Hope
- Founded: 1994; 32 years ago
- Ground: Newroz Stadium
- Capacity: 14,500
- Owner: Lahur Talabani
- Manager: Wali Kareem
- League: Iraq Stars League
- 2025–26: Iraq Stars League, 8th of 20
- Website: newrozsportsclub.com
Home colours	Away colours

Newroz Sports Club (Kurdish: یانەی وەرزشی نەورۆز, Arabic: نادي نوروز الرياضي) is a professional sports club based in Sulaymaniyah, Kurdistan Region, Iraq, whose football team plays in the Iraq Stars League, the top flight of Iraqi football.

== History ==
=== 2019–20 season ===
In the 2019–20 season, the Kurdistan Football Association announced the cancellation of the Kurdistan Premier League due to the COVID-19 pandemic. Newroz were at the top of the league standings until that time, where they played 15 matches, won 7, drew 5 and lost 3 matches, and collected 26 points.

=== 2020–21 season ===
Newroz participated in the Iraqi First Division League in the 2020–21 season, and two rounds before the end of the league, the team managed to maintain the top of the Group 1, and remained at the top of this group until the end of the league, where it qualified for the Iraqi Premier League for the first time, after collecting 30 points from 9 wins and 3 draw and one loss. In the final match, the team lost against Al-Sinaa 1–0 to take second place in the championship.

== New International Stadium ==
In January 2021, the former club president Lahur Sheix Jangi Talabani laid the foundation stone for the Newroz International Stadium in Sulaymaniyah. Their stadium can accommodate 14,500 spectators, the stadium has cost $12 million, The stadium opened on 26th of October, 2024. with their first game against Al-Najaf SC, Newroz won 2-1

== Current squad ==
=== First-team squad ===
As of 16 September 2026

Note: Flags indicate national team as defined under FIFA eligibility rules; some limited exceptions apply. Players may hold more than one non-FIFA nationality.

No.	Pos.	Nation	Player
1	GK	IRQ	Choman Ahmad
2	DF	IRQ	Mohammed Dlawar
3	DF	IRQ	Hussein Tareq
4	DF	SRB	Ognjen Mršić
5	DF	MOZ	Edmilson Dove
7	MF	IRQ	Mohammed Ridha Jalil
8	FW	IRQ	Marwan Hussein
9	FW	IRQ	Ibrahim Ghazi
11	DF	IRQ	Dhurgham Ismail
12	GK	IRQ	Ali Kadhim
13	DF	IRQ	Ayman Arzaij
14	MF	IRQ	Rastgo Fariq
16	MF	IRQ	Salam Mohammed Akar

No.	Pos.	Nation	Player
17	MF	TUN	Habib Oueslati
18	FW	IRQ	Mahmoud Al-Baeth
19	FW	IRQ	Mahdi Kamil
20	MF	IRQ	Ahamad Azzawi
22	GK	IRQ	Mohammed Abbas
25	MF	IRQ	Ali Hussein Anber
27	MF	IRQ	Rawa Yousif
30	FW	IRQ	Mustafa Radhi
33	DF	IRQ	Ameer Nadeem
37	FW	TAN	Simon Msuva
44	DF	IRQ	Hamoud Mashaan
50	FW	BRA	Neto Acará
99	FW	TUN	Imed Louati

== Managerial history ==
- (Iraq) Wali Kareem (2021 - 2022)
- (Iraq) Nizar Mahrouz (2022 - 2023)
- (Brazil) Jorvan Vieira (2023 - 2024)
- (Iraq) Qahtan Chatir (2024 - 2025)
- (Sweden) Yasin Aras (7/2025 - 10/2025)
- (Iraq) Wali Kareem (2025 - Present)

== Honours ==
- Iraqi Premier Division League (second tier)
  - Runners-up (1): 2020–21
