= 2019–20 Al-Shorta SC season =

Al-Shorta
2019–20 season
- President: (Iraq) Abdul-Wahab Al-Taei
- Manager: (Serbia) Aleksandar Ilić (until 18 February) (Iraq) Abdul-Ghani Shahad (from 18 February onwards)
- Ground: Al-Shaab Stadium
- Iraqi Premier League: Not completed
- Iraq FA Cup: Not completed
- Iraqi Super Cup: Winners
- AFC Champions League: Group stage
- Arab Club Champions Cup: Quarter-finals
- Top goalscorer: League: Alaa Abdul-Zahra, Marwan Hussein (3 each); All: Marwan Hussein (7 goals)
Home colours	Away colours	Asian home colours

The 2019–20 season was Al-Shorta's 46th season in the Iraqi Premier League, having featured in all 45 previous editions of the competition. Al-Shorta participated in five competitions: the Iraqi Premier League (as defending champions), the Iraq FA Cup, the Iraqi Super Cup, the AFC Champions League and the Arab Club Champions Cup.

Al-Shorta won the Iraqi Super Cup for the first time in their history, beating Al-Zawraa on penalties after a 1–1 draw. They also reached the quarter-finals of the Arab Club Champions Cup, their best performance at the tournament since they were crowned champions in the 1981–82 season. Al-Shorta only played a total of six League matches and one FA Cup match in the season as both competitions were postponed for several months due to the 2019–2020 Iraqi protests and later cancelled due to the COVID-19 pandemic. The pandemic also led to their remaining four AFC Champions League group stage matches being postponed to the 2020–21 campaign.

== Player statistics ==
Numbers in parentheses denote appearances as substitute.

No.	Pos.	Nat.	Name	Premier League		FA Cup		AFC Champions League		Arab Champions Cup		Super Cup		Total	
No.	Pos.	Nat.	Name	Apps	Goals	Apps	Goals	Apps	Goals	Apps	Goals	Apps	Goals	Apps	Goals
1	GK	IRQ	Ahmed Basil	1	0	1	0	2	0	1	0	0	0	5	0
2	DF	IRQ	Karrar Mohammed	1(1)	0	1	0	0	0	1(3)	0	0	0	2(4)	0
4	DF	IRQ	Saad Natiq	5	0	0	0	0	0	5	0	1	0	11	0
6	DF	IRQ	Ali Faez	4	0	0	0	2	1	5	0	1	0	12	1
8	MF	IRQ	Karrar Jassim	2(1)	0	0	0	0	0	3(1)	0	1	0	6(2)	0
9	FW	IRQ	Marwan Hussein	3(3)	3	1	3	0	0	1(2)	1	1	0	6(5)	7
10	FW	IRQ	Alaa Abdul-Zahra	6	3	0	0	2	0	6	1	1	0	15	4
11	DF	IRQ	Dhurgham Ismail (vice-captain)	4(1)	0	0	0	0	0	2	0	1	0	7(1)	0
13	MF	IRQ	Amjad Waleed	1(1)	1	1	1	0	0	0(1)	0	0	0	2(2)	2
14	FW	IRQ	Mazin Fayyadh	3(1)	0	1	0	2	0	1(1)	0	0	0	7(2)	0
15	MF	IRQ	Nabeel Sabah	4(2)	1	1	0	2	0	4(2)	2	0(1)	0	11(5)	3
16	MF	IRQ	Mohammed Mezher (on loan)	3	0	0	0	2	0	0	0	0	0	5	0
17	DF	IRQ	Alaa Mhawi	5(1)	0	0	0	0(1)	0	3(1)	0	0	0	8(3)	0
20	GK	IRQ	Mohammed Hameed	5	0	0	0	0	0	5	0	1	0	11	0
21	FW	DRC	Junior Mapuku	0(4)	0	0(1)	1	0(2)	0	0(1)	2	0(1)	1	0(9)	4
22	DF	IRQ	Hussam Kadhim	2(1)	0	1	0	2	0	4(1)	0	0	0	9(2)	0
23	DF	IRQ	Waleed Salem (captain)	1(2)	1	0	0	2	0	4	0	1	0	8(2)	1
24	DF	IRQ	Faisal Jassim	1	0	0	0	2	0	1(2)	0	0	0	4(2)	0
25	MF	IRQ	Saad Abdul-Amir	6	1	1	0	2	0	6	0	1	0	16	1
26	DF	IRQ	Bilal Khudhair	0	0	0(1)	0	0	0	0	0	0	0	0(1)	0
27	MF	IRQ	Atheer Salih	0	0	0(1)	0	0	0	0	0	0	0	0(1)	0
28	FW	IRQ	Ali Yousif	3	1	1	1	2	0	5	0	0	0	11	2
30	GK	IRQ	Alaa Khalil	0	0	0	0	0	0	0	0	0	0	0	0
31	MF	IRQ	Akram Rahim (on loan)	0(1)	0	0	0	0	0	0	0	0	0	0(1)	0
32	FW	COL	Diego Calderón Caicedo	0	0	0	0	0(2)	0	0	0	0	0	0(2)	0
34	MF	IRQ	Hassan Abdul-Karim	0(1)	0	0	0	0	0	0	0	0	0	0(1)	0
	GK	IRQ	Muhaimen Abdul-Rahman	0	0	0	0	0	0	0	0	0	0	0	0
	DF	IRQ	Mustafa Nadhim	0	0	0	0	0	0	0	0	0	0	0	0
	DF	IRQ	Munaf Younis (on loan)	0	0	0	0	0	0	0	0	0	0	0	0
	MF	IRQ	Abdul-Razzaq Qasim (on loan)	0	0	0	0	0	0	0	0	0	0	0	0
	FW	IRQ	Ali Jasim	0	0	0	0	0	0	0	0	0	0	0	0
	FW	IRQ	Al-Hassan Saad (on loan)	0	0	0	0	0	0	0	0	0	0	0	0
Players out on loan for rest of the season
	GK	IRQ	Abdul-Aziz Ammar	0	0	0	0	0	0	0	0	0	0	0	0
	MF	IRQ	Amoori Faisal	0	0	0	0	0	0	0	0	0	0	0	0
	MF	IRQ	Haidar Abdul-Salam	0	0	0	0	0	0	0	0	0	0	0	0
Players departed but featured this season
3	MF	MLI	Aboubacar Diarra	0(2)	0	1	0	0	0	0	0	1	0	2(2)	0
5	MF	IRQ	Safaa Hadi	2(1)	0	0	0	0	0	4(1)	0	0(1)	0	6(3)	0
7	FW	IRQ	Sherko Karim	1	0	1	0	0	0	1(1)	0	0(1)	0	3(2)	0
19	MF	IRQ	Amjad Attwan	3	0	0	0	0	0	4	2	1	0	8	2

== Personnel ==
=== Technical staff ===
Position	Name	Nationality
Head coach:	Abdul-Ghani Shahad	(Iraq)
Assistant coach:	Abbas Obeid	(Iraq)
Assistant coach:	Haidar Najim	(Iraq)
Fitness coach:	Sardar Mohammed	(Iraq)
Goalkeeping coach:	Emad Hashim	(Iraq)
Team analyst:	Ali Al-Nuaimi	(Iraq)
Team supervisor:	Hashim Ridha	(Iraq)
Medical director:	Haider Abdul-Zahra	(Iraq)
Administrator:	Bilal Hussein	(Iraq)
Director of football:	Salih Radhi	(Iraq)

=== Management ===
Position	Name	Nationality
President:	Abdul-Wahab Al-Taei	(Iraq)
Honorary President:	Yaseen Al-Yasiri	(Iraq)
Financial Secretary:	Uday Tariq	(Iraq)
Board Secretary	Alaa Bahar Al-Uloom	(Iraq)
Member of the Board:	Sadiq Jafar	(Iraq)
Member of the Board:	Ghazi Faisal	(Iraq)
Member of the Board:	Tahseen Al-Yassri	(Iraq)
Member of the Board:	Ali Al-Shahmani	(Iraq)
Member of the Board:	Ghalib Al-Zamili	(Iraq)
Member of the Board:	Ahsan Al-Daraji	(Iraq)

== Kit ==
Period	Home colours	Home colours (Asia)	Away colours	Away colours (Asia)	Supplier
August 2019 – January 2020		—		—	Givova
February 2020 – March 2020					Givova

== Transfers ==
=== In ===
Date	Pos.	Name	From	Fee
July 2019	FW	(Iraq) Marwan Hussein	(Iraq) Al-Talaba	-
July 2019	DF	(Iraq) Saad Natiq	(Iraq) Al-Quwa Al-Jawiya	-
August 2019	DF	(Iraq) Ali Faez	(Turkey) Çaykur Rizespor	-
August 2019	FW	(Iraq) Sherko Karim	(Switzerland) Grasshopper Club Zürich	-
August 2019	MF	(Mali) Aboubacar Diarra	(Egypt) ENPPI	-
August 2019	GK	(Iraq) Alaa Khalil	(Iraq) Al-Hudood	-
August 2019	MF	(Iraq) Nabeel Sabah	(Iraq) Al-Talaba	-
August 2019	FW	(Iraq) Ali Yousif	(Iraq) Al-Quwa Al-Jawiya	-
August 2019	MF	(Iraq) Safaa Hadi	(Iraq) Al-Zawraa	-
September 2019	FW	(Democratic Republic of the Congo) Junior Mapuku	(Romania) Dunărea Călărași	-
October 2019	FW	(Iraq) Mazin Fayyadh	(Iraq) Al-Naft	-
January 2020	MF	(Iraq) Mohammed Mezher	(Iraq) Naft Maysan	Loan
January 2020	MF	(Iraq) Akram Rahim	(Iraq) Naft Maysan	Loan
January 2020	FW	(Colombia) Diego Calderón Caicedo	(Saudi Arabia) Al-Faisaly	-
February 2020	MF	(Iraq) Hassan Abdul-Karim	(Iraq) Al-Karkh	End of loan
March 2020	DF	(Iraq) Munaf Younis	(Iraq) Al-Karkh	Loan
March 2020	MF	(Iraq) Abdul-Razzaq Qasim	(Iraq) Al-Karkh	Loan
March 2020	FW	(Iraq) Ali Jasim	(Iraq) Al-Karkh	-
March 2020	FW	(Iraq) Al-Hassan Saad	(Iraq) Al-Karkh	Loan
March 2020	DF	(Iraq) Mustafa Nadhim	Free agent	-

=== Out ===
Date	Pos.	Name	To	Fee
July 2019	MF	(Iraq) Hussein Abdul-Wahed		Retired
July 2019	MF	(Senegal) Dominique Mendy		Released
July 2019	DF	(Tunisia) Ziad Al-Derbali		Released
July 2019	FW	(Senegal) Alassane Diallo		Released
August 2019	DF	(Iraq) Mustafa Nadhim	(Iraq) Al-Zawraa	-
August 2019	GK	(Iraq) Mohammed Abbas	(Iraq) Al-Kahrabaa	-
August 2019	MF	(Iraq) Haider Abdul-Salam	(Iraq) Al-Karkh	Loan
August 2019	FW	(Iraq) Ammar Abdul-Hussein	(Iraq) Al-Minaa	-
August 2019	MF	(Iraq) Mahdi Kamel	(Iraq) Al-Zawraa	-
August 2019	MF	(Iraq) Moamel Kareem	(Iraq) Al-Samawa	-
August 2019	MF	(Iraq) Mohammed Mohsen	(Iraq) Al-Sinaat Al-Kahrabaiya	-
August 2019	DF	(Iraq) Ahmed Nadhim	(Iraq) Al-Naft	-
August 2019	MF	(Iraq) Amir Ahmed Abdul-Wahid	(Iraq) Al-Hudood	-
August 2019	GK	(Iraq) Abdul-Aziz Ammar	(Iraq) Naft Maysan	Loan
October 2019	MF	(Iraq) Hassan Abdul-Karim	(Iraq) Al-Karkh	Loan
October 2019	MF	(Iraq) Amoori Faisal	(Iraq) Al-Karkh	Loan
November 2019	MF	(Mali) Aboubacar Diarra		Released
December 2019	FW	(Iraq) Sherko Karim		Released
January 2020	MF	(Iraq) Amjad Attwan	Al-Kuwait	-
February 2020	MF	(Iraq) Safaa Hadi	(Russia) PFC Krylia Sovetov Samara	€150,000

== Competitions ==
=== Iraqi Super Cup ===
14 September 2019 Final	Al-Shorta	1 – 1 (4 – 3 p)	Al-Zawraa	Kut
15:00 GMT	Junior Mapuku 60'		Alaa Abbas 49'	Stadium: Al-Kut Olympic Stadium; Attendance: 19,000; Referee: Watheq Muhammed
	Penalties
	Junior Mapuku (penalty scored); Dhurgham Ismail (penalty scored); Ali Faez (penalty scored); Saad Abdul-Amir (penalty missed); Waleed Salem (penalty scored)		(penalty scored) Emad Mohsin; (penalty scored) Ahmed Jalal; (penalty scored) Ahmed Abdul-Amir; (penalty missed) Mohammed Abdul-Zahra; (penalty missed) Mohammed Ridha

=== Iraqi Premier League ===
Original season

18 September 2019 1	Al-Shorta	2 – 1	Al-Hudood	Baghdad
15:00 GMT	Waleed Salem 21' (pen.); Alaa Abdul-Zahra 62'		Hussam Jadallah 51'	Stadium: Al-Shaab Stadium

28 September 2019 2	Al-Zawraa	2 – 0	Al-Shorta	Baghdad
15:00 GMT	Hassan Houbeib 88'; Mohammed Ridha 90+2'		Saad Abdul-Amir (penalty missed) 53'	Stadium: Al-Shaab Stadium; Referee: Ali Sabah

22 October 2019 3	Naft Maysan	2 – 2	Al-Shorta	Amara
14:15 GMT	Wissam Saadoun 6'; Hassan Hamoud 50'		Nabeel Sabah 35'; Ali Yousif 45+1'	Stadium: Maysan Olympic Stadium

Restarted season

22 February 2020 1	Al-Kahrabaa	3 – 3	Al-Shorta	Baghdad
11:30 GMT	Ahmed Mahmoud 13'; Alaa Mhaisen 60'; Murad Mohammed 69'		Alaa Abdul-Zahra 17'; Amjad Waleed 67'; Marwan Hussein 84'	Stadium: Al-Taji Stadium

26 February 2020 2	Al-Shorta	3 – 1	Amanat Baghdad	Baghdad
13:30 GMT	Alaa Abdul-Zahra 3' (pen.); Marwan Hussein 22', 82'		Teddy James 77'	Stadium: Al-Shaab Stadium; Referee: Mohamed Salman

7 March 2020 3	Al-Shorta	1 – 1	Al-Minaa	Baghdad
13:30 GMT	Saad Abdul-Amir 75'		Abdoul Madjid Moumouni 69'	Stadium: Al-Shaab Stadium; Referee: Ali Sabah

=== Iraq FA Cup ===
9 October 2019 Round of 32	Bani Saad	0 – 6	Al-Shorta	Baghdad
12:00 GMT			Ali Yousif 6'; Marwan Hussein 22', 45+1' (pen.), 77'; Amjad Waleed 32'; Junior Mapuku 61' (pen.)	Stadium: Al-Shaab Stadium

=== AFC Champions League ===
Al-Shorta played two 2020 AFC Champions League matches in the 2019–20 season before their remaining matches in the competition were postponed to the following campaign due to the COVID-19 pandemic.

==== Group stage ====
10 February 2020 1	Al-Shorta (Iraq)	1 – 1	(Iran) Esteghlal	Erbil, Iraq
14:30 GMT	Ali Faez 48' (pen.)		Hussam Kadhim 24' (o.g.)	Stadium: Franso Hariri Stadium; Referee: Ahmed Al-Ali

17 February 2020 2	Al-Shorta (Iraq)	0 – 1	(United Arab Emirates) Al-Wahda	Erbil, Iraq
14:00 GMT			Paul-José M'Poku 88'	Stadium: Franso Hariri Stadium; Referee: Nazmi Nasaruddin
Note: Al-Wahda's results in the competition were later expunged.

=== Arab Club Champions Cup ===
==== Round of 32 ====
28 August 2019 First leg	Al-Kuwait	3 – 1	(Iraq) Al-Shorta	Kuwait City, Kuwait
17:15 GMT	Yousef Nasser 4' (pen.); Diego Calderón Caicedo 30'; Faisal Zayid 85'		Marwan Hussein 45+1'; Alaa Abdul-Zahra (penalty missed) 89'	Stadium: Al-Kuwait Stadium; Referee: Mahmoud El Banna

23 September 2019 Second leg	Al-Shorta (Iraq)	2 – 0 (3a – 3 agg.)	Al-Kuwait	Karbala, Iraq
16:00 GMT	Junior Mapuku 79', 90+5'			Stadium: Karbala International Stadium; Referee: Youssef Essrayri

==== Round of 16 ====
6 November 2019 First leg	FC Nouadhibou (Mauritania)	0 – 1	(Iraq) Al-Shorta	Nouakchott, Mauritania
17:00 GMT			Alaa Abdul-Zahra 56'	Stadium: Stade Cheikha Ould Boïdiya; Referee: Mustapha Ghorbal

25 November 2019 Second leg	Al-Shorta (Iraq)	5 – 0 (6 – 0 agg.)	(Mauritania) FC Nouadhibou	Al-Khor, Qatar
16:00 GMT	Jacob Ezekiel 8' (o.g.); Nabeel Sabah 12', 50'; Amjad Attwan 34', 38'			Stadium: Al-Khor Stadium; Referee: El Fadil Mohamed

==== Quarter-finals ====
23 December 2019 First leg	Al-Shabab (Saudi Arabia)	6 – 0	(Iraq) Al-Shorta	Riyadh, Saudi Arabia
16:00 GMT	Danilo Moreno Asprilla 6', 8', 44'; Sebá 19' (pen.), 72'; Cristian Guanca 22'			Stadium: Prince Faisal bin Fahd Stadium; Referee: Amin Omar

20 January 2020 Second leg	Al-Shorta (Iraq)	0 – 1 (0 – 7 agg.)	(Saudi Arabia) Al-Shabab	Amman, Jordan
14:30 GMT	Saad Abdul-Amir (red card) 48'		Cristian Guanca 89'	Stadium: King Abdullah II Stadium; Referee: Ammar Ashkanani

== Top goalscorers ==
=== Iraqi Premier League ===
Position	Nation	Squad Number	Name	Goals	Assists
FW	(Iraq)	10	Alaa Abdul-Zahra	3	1
FW	(Iraq)	9	Marwan Hussein	3	0
FW	(Iraq)	28	Ali Yousif	1	1
MF	(Iraq)	13	Amjad Waleed	1	0
MF	(Iraq)	15	Nabeel Sabah	1	0
DF	(Iraq)	23	Waleed Salem	1	0
MF	(Iraq)	25	Saad Abdul-Amir	1	0
FW	(Iraq)	14	Mazin Fayyadh	0	2
MF	(Iraq)	8	Karrar Jassim	0	1
DF	(Iraq)	11	Dhurgham Ismail	0	1
DF	(Iraq)	22	Hussam Kadhim	0	1

=== Iraq FA Cup ===
Position	Nation	Squad Number	Name	Goals	Assists
FW	(Iraq)	9	Marwan Hussein	3	0
MF	(Iraq)	13	Amjad Waleed	1	0
FW	(Democratic Republic of the Congo)	21	Junior Mapuku	1	0
FW	(Iraq)	28	Ali Yousif	1	0
FW	(Iraq)	7	Sherko Karim	0	2
FW	(Iraq)	14	Mazin Fayyadh	0	1

=== Iraqi Super Cup ===
Position	Nation	Squad Number	Name	Goals	Assists
FW	(Democratic Republic of the Congo)	21	Junior Mapuku	1	0
MF	(Iraq)	8	Karrar Jassim	0	1

=== AFC Champions League ===
Position	Nation	Squad Number	Name	Goals	Assists
DF	(Iraq)	6	Ali Faez	1	0

=== Arab Club Champions Cup ===
Position	Nation	Squad Number	Name	Goals	Assists
MF	(Iraq)	15	Nabeel Sabah	2	2
MF	(Iraq)	19	Amjad Attwan	2	1
FW	(Democratic Republic of the Congo)	21	Junior Mapuku	2	0
FW	(Iraq)	10	Alaa Abdul-Zahra	1	2
FW	(Iraq)	9	Marwan Hussein	1	1
MF	(Iraq)	8	Karrar Jassim	0	1
DF	(Iraq)	17	Alaa Mhawi	0	1
