= 2020–21 Al-Shorta SC season =

Al-Shorta
2020–21 season
- President: (Iraq) Abdul-Wahab Al-Taei
- Manager: (Iraq) Abdul-Ghani Shahad (until 9 November) (Jordan) Haitham Al-Shboul (Caretaker) (from 9 November to 8 December) (Serbia) Aleksandar Ilić (from 9 December onwards)
- Ground: Al-Shaab Stadium
- Iraqi Premier League: 4th
- Iraq FA Cup: Semi-finals
- 2020 ACL: Group stage
- 2021 ACL: Group stage
- Top goalscorer: League: Amjad Attwan (12); All: Amjad Attwan (13)
Home colours	Away colours

The 2020–21 season was Al-Shorta's 47th season in the Iraqi Premier League, having featured in all 46 previous editions of the competition. Al-Shorta participated in the Iraqi Premier League, the Iraq FA Cup and the AFC Champions League, having won the league title in the 2018–19 season (the 2019–20 league season was abandoned due to the COVID-19 pandemic). Al-Shorta were unable to defend their league title as they ended the season in fourth place, while they reached the semi-finals of the Iraq FA Cup and were eliminated from the AFC Champions League group stages.

== Player statistics ==
Numbers in parentheses denote appearances as substitute.

No.	Pos.	Nat.	Name	Premier League		FA Cup		2020 ACL		2021 ACL		Total	
No.	Pos.	Nat.	Name	Apps	Goals	Apps	Goals	Apps	Goals	Apps	Goals	Apps	Goals
1	GK	IRQ	Ahmed Basil	23	0	0	0	3	0	6	0	32	0
2	DF	IRQ	Uday Shehab	2(1)	0	3	0	0	0	0(1)	0	5(2)	0
3	DF	IRQ	Karrar Amer	18(4)	1	2	0	3	0	4	0	27(4)	1
4	DF	IRQ	Saad Natiq	28(1)	7	0	0	3	1	6	0	37(1)	8
5	DF	IRQ	Ali Faez	29	3	0	0	3	0	5	0	37	3
6	MF	SYR	Fahd Al-Youssef	17(1)	1	3	1	0	0	6	1	26(1)	3
7	MF	IRQ	Amjad Attwan	32(1)	12	0	0	0	0	5(1)	1	37(2)	13
8	MF	IRQ	Murad Mohammed	16(10)	2	3(1)	2	0(1)	0	0(1)	0	19(13)	4
9	FW	VEN	Gelmin Rivas	6(3)	6	1(2)	0	0	0	1(2)	0	8(7)	6
10	FW	IRQ	Marwan Hussein	4(11)	2	1(2)	0	2(1)	0	0	0	7(14)	2
11	MF	IRQ	Ahmed Jalal	6(7)	0	1	2	1(2)	0	0	0	8(9)	2
13	MF	IRQ	Ali Husni	9(10)	1	0	0	0	0	2(1)	0	11(11)	1
14	FW	IRQ	Mazin Fayyadh	24(5)	2	2	0	3	2	4(2)	0	33(7)	4
15	DF	IRQ	Khudhor Ali	18(13)	0	4	0	1(2)	0	4(1)	0	27(16)	0
16	MF	IRQ	Mohammed Mezher	3(2)	0	0	0	3	0	0	0	6(2)	0
17	DF	IRQ	Alaa Mhawi	23(4)	4	0	0	2	0	4	0	29(4)	4
19	MF	IRQ	Mohammed Qasim Majid	29(3)	6	0	0	1	0	3(1)	0	33(4)	6
20	GK	IRQ	Mohammed Hameed (captain)	15(1)	0	2(1)	0	0	0	0	0	17(2)	0
22	DF	IRQ	Hussam Kadhim	20(7)	0	3	0	3	0	3	0	29(7)	0
25	MF	IRQ	Saad Abdul-Amir (vice-captain)	32	3	4	0	3	0	6	0	45	3
26	MF	IRQ	Ammar Ghalib	0(7)	1	0(4)	0	0	0	0(2)	0	0(13)	1
28	FW	IRQ	Ali Yousif	1(7)	0	2(1)	1	0	0	0(1)	0	3(9)	1
29	FW	IRQ	Mohammed Dawood	13(3)	3	0	0	0	0	5(1)	1	18(4)	4
30	GK	IRQ	Alaa Khalil	0	0	2	0	0	0	0	0	2	0
31	FW	IRQ	Ali Jasim	1(8)	0	0(3)	0	0	0	0	0	1(11)	0
32	DF	IRQ	Hassan Ashour	18(5)	0	3	0	0(1)	0	0(1)	0	21(7)	0
33	MF	IRQ	Jassim Mohammed	6(14)	0	4	1	1(1)	0	1(4)	0	12(19)	1
34	GK	IRQ	Moamel Mohammed	0	0	0	0	0	0	0	0	0	0
35	MF	IRQ	Ali Mahdi	6(11)	0	1(2)	0	0	0	0(2)	0	7(15)	0
Players out on loan for rest of the season
21	MF	IRQ	Sadeq Zamil	0(2)	0	1	0	0(2)	0	0	0	1(4)	0
	GK	IRQ	Abdul-Aziz Ammar	0	0	0	0	0	0	0	0	0	0
	DF	IRQ	Bilal Khudhair	0	0	0	0	0	0	0	0	0	0
	MF	IRQ	Atheer Salih	0	0	0	0	0	0	0	0	0	0
	MF	IRQ	Haidar Abdul-Salam	0	0	0	0	0	0	0	0	0	0
	MF	IRQ	Hassan Abdul-Karim	0	0	0	0	0	0	0	0	0	0
Players departed but featured this season
6	MF	COL	Daniel Hernández	0(1)	0	0(1)	0	0	0	0	0	0(2)	0
9	FW	IRQ	Mohammed Jabbar Shokan	5(9)	0	1	0	1(2)	0	0	0	7(11)	0
24	FW	NGR	Christian Osaguona	9(1)	2	1	0	0	0	0	0	10(1)	2
27	FW	BRA	Rafael Silva	4(3)	3	0	0	0	0	1	0	5(3)	3
29	FW	IRQ	Hussam Jadallah	1(4)	0	0(1)	0	0(1)	0	0	0	1(6)	0

== Personnel ==
=== Technical staff ===
Position	Name	Nationality
Manager:	Aleksandar Ilić	(Serbia)
Assistant manager:	Dejan Tričković	(Serbia)
Fitness coach:	Ahmed Juma	(Iraq)
Goalkeeping coach:	Hussein Jabbar (on loan)	(Iraq)
Technical advisor:	Younis Abid Ali	(Iraq)
Administrative director:	Hashim Ridha	(Iraq)

=== Management ===
Position	Name	Nationality
President:	Abdul-Wahab Al-Taei	(Iraq)
Financial secretary:	Uday Tariq	(Iraq)
Board secretary	Alaa Bahar Al-Uloom	(Iraq)
Member of the Board:	Sadiq Jafar	(Iraq)
Member of the Board:	Ghazi Faisal	(Iraq)
Member of the Board:	Tahseen Al-Yassri	(Iraq)
Member of the Board:	Ali Al-Shahmani	(Iraq)
Member of the Board:	Ghalib Al-Zamili	(Iraq)
Member of the Board:	Ahsan Al-Daraji	(Iraq)

== Kit ==
Supplier: Qitharah (club's own brand)

Home	Away

== Transfers ==
=== In ===
Date	Pos.	Name	From	Fee
June 2020	MF	(Iraq) Ahmed Jalal	(Iraq) Al-Zawraa	-
June 2020	FW	(Iraq) Hussam Jadallah	(Iraq) Al-Hudood	-
June 2020	DF	(Iraq) Karrar Amer	(Iraq) Al-Najaf	-
June 2020	MF	(Iraq) Murad Mohammed	(Iraq) Al-Kahrabaa	-
June 2020	DF	(Iraq) Khudhor Ali	(Iraq) Naft Al-Wasat	-
June 2020	MF	(Iraq) Jassim Mohammed	(Iraq) Amanat Baghdad	-
June 2020	MF	(Iraq) Mohammed Mezher	(Iraq) Naft Maysan	-
June 2020	DF	(Iraq) Hassan Ashour	(Iraq) Al-Kahrabaa	-
July 2020	MF	(Iraq) Ali Mahdi	(Iraq) Al-Karkh	-
July 2020	MF	(Iraq) Sadeq Zamil	(Iraq) Naft Al-Basra	-
July 2020	FW	(Iraq) Mohammed Jabbar Shokan	(Kuwait) Kazma	-
July 2020	MF	(Iraq) Mohammed Qasim Majid	(Iraq) Al-Quwa Al-Jawiya	-
September 2020	FW	(Nigeria) Christian Osaguona	(Iran) Persepolis	-
October 2020	GK	(Iraq) Moamel Mohammed	(Iraq) Amanat Baghdad	-
October 2020	MF	(Iraq) Amjad Attwan	Al-Kuwait	-
October 2020	MF	(Colombia) Daniel Hernández	(Colombia) Deportivo Pasto	-
February 2021	MF	(Iraq) Ali Husni	(Iraq) Al-Quwa Al-Jawiya	-
February 2021	FW	(Brazil) Rafael Silva	(Bolivia) Always Ready	-
February 2021	FW	(Iraq) Mohammed Dawood	(Iraq) Al-Naft	-
February 2021	DF	(Iraq) Uday Shehab	(Iraq) Al-Karkh	-
February 2021	FW	(Venezuela) Gelmin Rivas	Free agent	-
February 2021	MF	(Syria) Fahd Al-Youssef	(Jordan) Al-Wehdat	-

=== Out ===
Date	Pos.	Name	To	Fee
June 2020	MF	(Iraq) Akram Rahim	(Iraq) Naft Maysan	End of loan
June 2020	DF	(Iraq) Munaf Younis	(Iraq) Al-Karkh	End of loan
June 2020	MF	(Iraq) Abdul-Razzaq Qasim	(Iraq) Al-Karkh	End of loan
June 2020	FW	(Iraq) Al-Hassan Saad	(Iraq) Al-Karkh	End of loan
June 2020	FW	(Democratic Republic of the Congo) Junior Mapuku		Released
June 2020	FW	(Colombia) Diego Calderón Caicedo		Released
June 2020	MF	(Iraq) Nabeel Sabah	(Iraq) Naft Al-Wasat	-
June 2020	MF	(Iraq) Amjad Waleed	(Iraq) Zakho	-
June 2020	DF	(Iraq) Faisal Jassim	(Iraq) Naft Al-Wasat	-
June 2020	DF	(Iraq) Mustafa Nadhim	(Iraq) Amanat Baghdad	-
June 2020	DF	(Iraq) Dhurgham Ismail	(Iraq) Al-Zawraa	-
June 2020	DF	(Iraq) Waleed Salem	(Iraq) Zakho	-
June 2020	FW	(Iraq) Alaa Abdul-Zahra	(Iraq) Al-Zawraa	-
July 2020	GK	(Iraq) Abdul-Aziz Ammar	(Iraq) Zakho	Loan
July 2020	MF	(Iraq) Haidar Abdul-Salam	(Iraq) Al-Qasim	Loan
July 2020	MF	(Iraq) Atheer Salih	(Iraq) Al-Qasim	Loan
July 2020	MF	(Iraq) Amoori Faisal	(Iraq) Al-Karkh	-
August 2020	MF	(Iraq) Karrar Jassim		Released
August 2020	MF	(Iraq) Hassan Abdul-Karim	(Iraq) Al-Karkh	Loan
September 2020	DF	(Iraq) Bilal Khudhair	(Iraq) Al-Hudood	Loan
October 2020	DF	(Iraq) Karrar Mohammed	(Iraq) Amanat Baghdad	-
January 2021	GK	(Iraq) Abdul-Aziz Ammar	(Iraq) Al-Karkh	Loan
January 2021	MF	(Colombia) Daniel Hernández		Released
February 2021	FW	(Nigeria) Christian Osaguona		Released
February 2021	MF	(Iraq) Sadeq Zamil	(Iraq) Naft Al-Basra	Loan
February 2021	FW	(Iraq) Hussam Jadallah	(Iraq) Al-Naft	-
February 2021	FW	(Iraq) Mohammed Jabbar Shokan	(Iraq) Al-Minaa	-
June 2021	FW	(Brazil) Rafael Silva	(Indonesia) Madura United	-

== Competitions ==
=== Iraqi Premier League ===
25 October 2020 1	Al-Shorta	1 – 1	Al-Zawraa	Baghdad
12:00 GMT	Amjad Attwan 21'		Mohammed Salih 28'	Stadium: Al-Shaab Stadium

30 October 2020 2	Al-Shorta	2 – 0	Amanat Baghdad	Baghdad
16:30 GMT	Christian Osaguona 31'; Ali Faez 86' (pen.)			Stadium: Al-Shaab Stadium

5 November 2020 3	Zakho	0 – 0	Al-Shorta	Zakho
11:30 GMT				Stadium: Zakho International Stadium

22 November 2020 4	Al-Shorta	1 – 0	Al-Qasim	Karbala
14:30 GMT	Mazin Fayyadh 90'			Stadium: Karbala International Stadium

27 November 2020 5	Al-Diwaniya	2 – 0	Al-Shorta	Diwaniya
11:00 GMT	Nathan Kabasele 44'; Ali Hamed 88' (pen.)			Stadium: Al-Diwaniya Stadium

3 December 2020 6	Al-Shorta	1 – 1	Naft Al-Wasat	Karbala
13:15 GMT	Amjad Attwan 22'		Sajjad Jassim 36'	Stadium: Karbala International Stadium

8 December 2020 7	Al-Samawa	0 – 3	Al-Shorta	Samawa
11:00 GMT			Christian Osaguona 9' (pen.); Alaa Mhawi 51'; Saad Natiq 74'	Stadium: Al-Samawa Stadium

13 December 2020 8	Al-Shorta	0 – 0	Al-Najaf	Baghdad
16:30 GMT				Stadium: Al-Shaab Stadium

18 December 2020 9	Naft Maysan	1 – 1	Al-Shorta	Amara
11:00 GMT	Nasser Hammouda 5'		Saad Natiq 51'	Stadium: Maysan Olympic Stadium

23 December 2020 10	Al-Shorta	1 – 0	Al-Karkh	Baghdad
17:00 GMT	Alaa Mhawi 10'			Stadium: Al-Shaab Stadium

28 December 2020 11	Erbil	0 – 1	Al-Shorta	Erbil
13:40 GMT			Alaa Mhawi 77'	Stadium: Franso Hariri Stadium
Note: The match was delayed for 25 minutes due to the presence of fans in the stadium, which was not allowed due to COVID-19 restrictions.

2 January 2021 12	Al-Shorta	4 – 2	Al-Minaa	Baghdad
14:00 GMT	Mohammed Qasim Majid 2'; Saad Abdul-Amir 4'; Murad Mohammed 33'; Amjad Attwan 69' (pen.)		Rostand Junior M'baï 60'; Hussein Younis Nasser 90+1'	Stadium: Al-Shaab Stadium

6 January 2021 13	Al-Naft	2 – 2	Al-Shorta	Baghdad
11:00 GMT	Mohammed Dawood 44'; Laith Tahseen 47'		Saad Natiq 17'; Mohammed Qasim Majid 80'	Stadium: Al-Taji Stadium
Note: Al-Shorta goalkeeper Mohammed Hameed and Al-Naft goalkeeper Mustafa Saadoun both received red cards after the end of the match.

17 January 2021 14	Al-Talaba	0 – 1	Al-Shorta	Baghdad
17:30 GMT			Saad Natiq 37'	Stadium: Al-Shaab Stadium

22 January 2021 15	Al-Shorta	0 – 0	Al-Quwa Al-Jawiya	Baghdad
16:45 GMT				Stadium: Al-Shaab Stadium

31 January 2021 16	Al-Hudood	0 – 2	Al-Shorta	Baghdad
10:00 GMT			Murad Mohammed 10'; Saad Natiq 86'	Stadium: Al-Taji Stadium

4 February 2021 17	Al-Shorta	0 – 0	Al-Kahrabaa	Baghdad
16:45 GMT	Mohammed Jabbar Shokan (penalty missed) 43'			Stadium: Al-Shaab Stadium

10 February 2021 18	Naft Al-Basra	0 – 1	Al-Shorta	Basra
13:15 GMT			Amjad Attwan 57' (pen.)	Stadium: Al-Fayhaa Stadium

14 February 2021 19	Al-Shorta	1 – 1	Al-Sinaat Al-Kahrabaiya	Baghdad
11:00 GMT	Marwan Hussein 85'		Mustafa Mahmoud 78'	Stadium: Al-Shaab Stadium

24 February 2021 20	Al-Zawraa	1 – 0	Al-Shorta	Baghdad
17:00 GMT	Alaa Abdul-Zahra 89'			Stadium: Al-Shaab Stadium

1 March 2021 21	Amanat Baghdad	1 – 1	Al-Shorta	Baghdad
11:00 GMT	Mohamad Kdouh 43'; Sattar Jabbar (yellow card) (yellow-red card) 67'		Saad Abdul-Amir 22'; Ali Faez (penalty missed) 69'	Stadium: Amanat Baghdad Stadium

5 March 2021 22	Al-Shorta	2 – 1	Zakho	Baghdad
13:00 GMT	Rafael Silva 22'; Ali Faez 78'		Ahmed Mohammed 50'	Stadium: Al-Shaab Stadium

11 March 2021 23	Al-Qasim	0 – 2	Al-Shorta	Babil
10:30 GMT			Gelmin Rivas 27'; Mohammed Qasim Majid 88'	Stadium: Al-Kifl Olympic Stadium

15 March 2021 24	Al-Shorta	5 – 0	Al-Diwaniya	Baghdad
13:15 GMT	Gelmin Rivas 23', 64'; Ali Faez 62'; Mohammed Al-Baqir 74' (o.g.); Marwan Hussein 90+1'			Stadium: Al-Shaab Stadium
Note: Al-Shorta defender Hassan Ashour received a red card in the 69th minute after being substituted off the field.

20 March 2021 25	Naft Al-Wasat	1 – 0	Al-Shorta	Karbala
15:30 GMT	Sajjad Jassim 31' (pen.); Hussein Abdul-Wahid (penalty missed) 83'			Stadium: Karbala International Stadium

2 April 2021 26	Al-Shorta	7 – 0	Al-Samawa	Baghdad
14:30 GMT	Gelmin Rivas 18', 35'; Ali Husni 26'; Saad Natiq 55'; Rafael Silva 74'; Saad Abdul-Amir 79'; Ammar Ghalib 90+1'			Stadium: Al-Shaab Stadium

8 April 2021 27	Al-Najaf	3 – 1	Al-Shorta	Najaf
17:45 GMT	Kenan Adel Nima 14', 21'; Taher Hameed 35'		Rafael Silva 53'	Stadium: Al-Najaf International Stadium
Note: The match was stopped for 31 minutes during the first half due to a power outage in the stadium.

5 May 2021 28	Al-Shorta	3 – 1	Naft Maysan	Baghdad
19:00 GMT	Amjad Attwan 41' (pen.), 65'; Mohammed Qasim Majid 56'		Akram Rahim 28'	Stadium: Al-Shaab Stadium

8 May 2021 29	Al-Karkh	0 – 3	Al-Shorta	Baghdad
13:00 GMT			Mazin Fayyadh 28'; Amjad Attwan 48'; Mohammed Dawood 60'	Stadium: Al-Saher Ahmed Radhi Stadium

12 May 2021 30	Al-Shorta	2 – 1	Erbil	Baghdad
14:45 GMT	Fahd Al-Youssef 73'; Amjad Attwan 88'		Sherko Karim 67'	Stadium: Al-Shaab Stadium

16 May 2021 31	Al-Minaa	2 – 3	Al-Shorta	Basra
18:30 GMT	Hussam Malik 25' (pen.); Saif Jassim 71'; Ammar Abdul-Hussein (red card) 88'; Ahmed Khalid (yellow card) (yellow-red card) 90+2'		Mohammed Qasim Majid 43'; Mohammed Dawood 51'; Amjad Attwan (penalty missed) 77', 83'; Saad Natiq (yellow card) (yellow-red card) 89'	Stadium: Al-Fayhaa Stadium

21 June 2021 32	Al-Shorta	1 – 1	Al-Naft	Baghdad
16:15 GMT	Karrar Amer 40'		Raad Fanar 73'	Stadium: Al-Shaab Stadium

26 June 2021 33	Al-Shorta	2 – 0	Al-Talaba	Baghdad
17:00 GMT	Mohammed Dawood (penalty missed) 4'; Amjad Attwan 9', 44'			Stadium: Al-Shaab Stadium

1 July 2021 34	Al-Quwa Al-Jawiya	2 – 0	Al-Shorta	Baghdad
19:00 GMT	Aymen Hussein 87'; Sharif Abdul-Kadhim 90+1'			Stadium: Al-Shaab Stadium

6 July 2021 35	Al-Shorta	1 – 2	Al-Hudood	Baghdad
18:30 GMT	Alaa Mhawi 36'		Manar Taha 46', 90+2' (pen.)	Stadium: Al-Shaab Stadium

11 July 2021 36	Al-Kahrabaa	0 – 3	Al-Shorta	Baghdad
14:00 GMT			Saad Natiq 39'; Amjad Attwan 61' (pen.); Mohammed Qasim Majid 88'	Stadium: Al-Taji Stadium

15 July 2021 37	Al-Shorta	1 – 0	Naft Al-Basra	Baghdad
14:00 GMT	Mohammed Dawood 29'; Gelmin Rivas (penalty missed) 67'			Stadium: Al-Sinaa Stadium

26 July 2021 38	Al-Sinaat Al-Kahrabaiya	1 – 1	Al-Shorta	Baghdad
14:00 GMT	Sheka Fofanah (red card) 8'; Mahmoud Ahmed 11' (pen.)		Gelmin Rivas 47'	Stadium: Al-Sinaa Stadium

=== Iraq FA Cup ===
17 November 2020 Round of 32	Al-Khalis	0 – 5	Al-Shorta	Baghdad
11:00 GMT			Ahmed Jalal 10', 69'; Jassim Mohammed 31'; Murad Mohammed 65', 72'	Stadium: Al-Taji Stadium

25 March 2021 Round of 16	Al-Shorta	0 – 0 (8 – 7 p)	Amanat Baghdad	Karbala
14:30 GMT				Stadium: Karbala International Stadium
	Penalties
	Fahd Al-Youssef (penalty scored); Gelmin Rivas (penalty scored); Khudhor Ali (penalty scored); Saad Abdul-Amir (penalty scored); Murad Mohammed (penalty scored); Mohammed Hameed (penalty missed); Ammar Ghalib (penalty scored); Karrar Amer (penalty scored); Hussam Kadhim (penalty scored)		(penalty scored) Jabbar Kareem; (penalty scored) Sadia Oliver; (penalty scored) Mohanad Arzeij; (penalty scored) Mohammed Salam; (penalty scored) Aymen Rzaiej; (penalty missed) Samuel Iko; (penalty scored) Ali Hussein; (penalty scored) Sattar Jabbar; (penalty missed) Milad Falah

4 June 2021 Quarter-finals	Al-Shorta	2 – 1	Al-Minaa	Baghdad
17:00 GMT	Ali Yousif 27'; Fahd Al-Youssef 31'		Saif Jassim 34'	Stadium: Al-Shaab Stadium

10 June 2021 Semi-finals	Al-Shorta	0 – 2	Al-Zawraa	Baghdad
20:00 GMT			Murad Mohammed 8' (o.g.); Mohammed Ridha Jalil 24'; Ahmad Fadhel (yellow card) 26' (yellow-red card) 35'	Stadium: Al-Shaab Stadium

=== 2020 AFC Champions League ===
==== Group stage ====
Al-Shorta's first two group stage games were played in the 2019–20 season before the tournament was postponed due to the COVID-19 pandemic.

Pos	Team	Pld	W	D	L	GF	GA	GD	Pts	Qualification
1	(Saudi Arabia) Al-Ahli	4	2	0	2	4	6	−2	6	Round of 16
2	(Iran) Esteghlal	4	1	2	1	6	4	+2	5	Round of 16
3	(Iraq) Al-Shorta	4	1	2	1	4	4	0	5	
4	(United Arab Emirates) Al-Wahda	0	0	0	0	0	0	0	0	Withdrew, results expunged (Note: Al-Wahda were unable to travel to Qatar to play the final four matches of the group stage due to several team members having tested positive for COVID-19. They were considered to have withdrawn from the competition, and their results were expunged.)

Source: AFC
Notes:

14 September 2020 3	Al-Ahli (Saudi Arabia)	1 – 0	(Iraq) Al-Shorta	Doha, Qatar
15:00 GMT	Marko Marin 87'		Alaa Mhawi (yellow card) 25' (yellow-red card) 45+1'	Stadium: Khalifa International Stadium; Referee: Nawaf Shukralla

17 September 2020 4	Al-Shorta (Iraq)	2 – 1	(Saudi Arabia) Al-Ahli	Doha, Qatar
15:00 GMT	Saad Natiq 14'; Mazin Fayyadh 65'		Mohammed Al-Majhad 56'	Stadium: Khalifa International Stadium; Referee: Sherzod Kasimov

20 September 2020 5	Esteghlal (Iran)	1 – 1	(Iraq) Al-Shorta	Doha, Qatar
18:00 GMT	Amir Arsalan Motahari 68'		Mazin Fayyadh 26'	Stadium: Khalifa International Stadium; Referee: Ko Hyung-jin

=== 2021 AFC Champions League ===
==== Group stage ====
Pos	Team	Pld	W	D	L	GF	GA	GD	Pts	Qualification
1	(Iran) Esteghlal	6	3	2	1	14	8	+6	11	Round of 16
2	(Qatar) Al-Duhail	6	2	3	1	11	9	+2	9	
3	(Saudi Arabia) Al-Ahli (H)	6	2	3	1	9	8	+1	9	
4	(Iraq) Al-Shorta	6	1	0	5	3	12	−9	3	

Source: AFC
(H) Hosts

15 April 2021 1	Al-Duhail (Qatar)	2 – 0	(Iraq) Al-Shorta	Jeddah, Saudi Arabia
17:45 GMT	Hussam Kadhim 36' (o.g.); Edmilson Junior 53'			Stadium: Sports Hall; Referee: Muhammad Taqi

18 April 2021 2	Al-Shorta (Iraq)	0 – 3	(Iran) Esteghlal	Jeddah, Saudi Arabia
20:15 GMT	Hussam Kadhim (red card) 11'		Mohammad Naderi 44'; Farshid Esmaeili 55'; Cheick Diabaté 65'	Stadium: Sports Hall; Referee: Nivon Robesh Gamini

21 April 2021 3	Al-Shorta (Iraq)	0 – 3	(Saudi Arabia) Al-Ahli	Jeddah, Saudi Arabia
20:15 GMT			Abdullah Hassoun 22'; Driss Fettouhi 37'; Abdulrahman Ghareeb 90+4'	Stadium: Sports Hall; Referee: Muhammad Taqi

24 April 2021 4	Al-Ahli (Saudi Arabia)	2 – 1	(Iraq) Al-Shorta	Jeddah, Saudi Arabia
17:45 GMT	Omar Al Somah 5'; Abdulrahman Ghareeb 79'		Fahd Al-Youssef 26'	Stadium: Sports Hall; Referee: Sivakorn Pu-udom

27 April 2021 5	Al-Shorta (Iraq)	2 – 1	(Qatar) Al-Duhail	Jeddah, Saudi Arabia
17:45 GMT	Amjad Attwan 3'; Mohammed Dawood 85'		Michael Olunga 57'; Mehdi Benatia (yellow card) 76' (yellow-red card) 90+6'	Stadium: Sports Hall; Referee: Omar Al-Yaqoubi

30 April 2021 6	Esteghlal (Iran)	1 – 0	(Iraq) Al-Shorta	Jeddah, Saudi Arabia
17:45 GMT	Cheick Diabaté 14', (penalty missed) 19'			Stadium: Sports Hall; Referee: Sivakorn Pu-udom

== Top goalscorers ==
=== Iraqi Premier League ===
Position	Nation	Squad Number	Name	Goals	Assists
MF	(Iraq)	7	Amjad Attwan	12	8
DF	(Iraq)	4	Saad Natiq	7	1
MF	(Iraq)	19	Mohammed Qasim Majid	6	4
FW	(Venezuela)	9	Gelmin Rivas	6	1
DF	(Iraq)	17	Alaa Mhawi	4	1
DF	(Iraq)	5	Ali Faez	3	5
FW	(Iraq)	29	Mohammed Dawood	3	4
MF	(Iraq)	25	Saad Abdul-Amir	3	3
FW	(Brazil)	27	Rafael Silva	3	1
FW	(Iraq)	10	Marwan Hussein	2	1
FW	(Iraq)	14	Mazin Fayyadh	2	1
MF	(Iraq)	8	Murad Mohammed	2	0
FW	(Nigeria)	24	Christian Osaguona	2	0
MF	(Syria)	6	Fahd Al-Youssef	1	5
MF	(Iraq)	13	Ali Husni	1	0
MF	(Iraq)	26	Ammar Ghalib	1	0
FW	(Iraq)	9	Mohammed Jabbar Shokan	0	1
DF	(Iraq)	22	Hussam Kadhim	0	1
FW	(Iraq)	28	Ali Yousif	0	1
FW	(Iraq)	29	Hussam Jadallah	0	1
MF	(Iraq)	33	Jassim Mohammed	0	1
MF	(Iraq)	35	Ali Mahdi	0	1

=== Iraq FA Cup ===
Position	Nation	Squad Number	Name	Goals	Assists
MF	(Iraq)	11	Ahmed Jalal	2	1
MF	(Iraq)	8	Murad Mohammed	2	0
MF	(Syria)	6	Fahd Al-Youssef	1	0
FW	(Iraq)	28	Ali Yousif	1	0
MF	(Iraq)	33	Jassim Mohammed	1	0
MF	(Iraq)	21	Sadeq Zamil	0	1
MF	(Iraq)	25	Saad Abdul-Amir	0	1
FW	(Iraq)	29	Hussam Jadallah	0	1

=== 2020 AFC Champions League ===
Position	Nation	Squad Number	Name	Goals	Assists
MF	(Iraq)	14	Mazin Fayyadh	2	0
DF	(Iraq)	4	Saad Natiq	1	0
DF	(Iraq)	5	Ali Faez	0	2
DF	(Iraq)	15	Khudhor Ali	0	1

=== 2021 AFC Champions League ===
Position	Nation	Squad Number	Name	Goals	Assists
MF	(Syria)	6	Fahd Al-Youssef	1	1
MF	(Iraq)	7	Amjad Attwan	1	0
FW	(Iraq)	29	Mohammed Dawood	1	0
DF	(Iraq)	4	Saad Natiq	0	1
