= 2016 AFC U-23 Championship =

بطولة آسيا تحت 23 سنة لكرة القدم 2016

Tournament details
- Host country: Qatar
- Dates: 12–30 January
- Teams: 16 (from 1 confederation)
- Venue: 4 (in 2 host cities)

Final positions
- Champions: Japan (1st title)
- Runners-up: South Korea
- Third place: Iraq
- Fourth place: Qatar

Tournament statistics
- Matches played: 32
- Goals scored: 103 (3.22 per match)
- Attendance: 93,639 (2,926 per match)
- Top scorer(s): (Qatar) Ahmed Alaa (6 goals)
- Best player: (Japan) Shoya Nakajima
- Fair play award: Japan

The 2016 AFC U-23 Championship (also known as the 2016 AFC U-23 Asian Cup) was the second edition of the AFC U-23 Championship, the biennial international age-restricted football championship organised by the Asian Football Confederation (AFC) for the men's under-23 national teams of Asia. The tournament was held in Qatar between 12–30 January 2016. A total of 16 teams compete in the tournament. The tournament was also renamed from the "AFC U-22 Championship" to the "AFC U-23 Championship".

For the first time, the AFC U-23 Championship acted as the AFC qualifiers for the Olympic football tournament, replacing the previous process of home-and-away Olympic qualifiers. The top three teams of the tournament qualified for the 2016 Summer Olympics men's football tournament in Brazil as the AFC representatives.

Japan won the tournament with a 3–2 final win over South Korea. Both finalists and third-placed Iraq qualified for the Olympics.

== Host selection ==
Qatar was one of the countries which came forward wishing to host the finals competition. They were selected over the other bidding nations Uzbekistan, Saudi Arabia and Iran.

== Qualification ==
The qualifiers draw was held on Thursday, 4 December 2014. A total of 43 teams were drawn into ten groups, with the ten group winners and the five best runners-up qualifying for the final tournament, together with Qatar who qualified automatically as hosts.

Qualification rounds were played between 23–31 March 2015, except for Group B which was scheduled to be held in Lahore, Pakistan, but was postponed due to the Lahore church bombings.

=== Qualified teams ===
The following 16 teams qualified for the final tournament.

Team	Qualified as	Appearance	Previous best performance
Qatar	Hosts	1st	Debut
Iraq	Group A winners	2nd	Champions (2013)
Jordan	Group B winners	2nd	Third place (2013)
Saudi Arabia	Group C winners	2nd	Runners-up (2013)
United Arab Emirates	Group D winners	2nd	Quarter-finals (2013)
Syria	Group E winners	2nd	Quarter-finals (2013)
Australia	Group F winners	2nd	Quarter-finals (2013)
North Korea	Group G winners	2nd	Group stage (2013)
South Korea	Group H winners	2nd	Fourth place (2013)
Japan	Group I winners	2nd	Quarter-finals (2013)
China	Group J winners	2nd	Group stage (2013)
Thailand	1st best runners-up (Group G)	1st	Debut
Iran	2nd best runners-up (Group C)	2nd	Group stage (2013)
Vietnam	3rd best runners-up (Group I)	1st	Debut
Yemen	4th best runners-up (Group D)	2nd	Group stage (2013)
Uzbekistan	5th best runners-up (Group E)	2nd	Group stage (2013)

== Venues ==
The tournament was held in four stadiums, located in the cities of Al Rayyan and Doha.

Al Rayyan (Doha Area)	Doha			Location of the host cities of the 2016 AFC U-23 Championship.
Jassim bin Hamad Stadium (Al-Sadd Stadium)	Abdullah bin Khalifa Stadium (Lekhwiya Stadium)	Grand Hamad Stadium (Al-Arabi Stadium)	Suheim bin Hamad Stadium (Qatar SC Stadium)	Location of the host cities of the 2016 AFC U-23 Championship.
Capacity: 15,000	Capacity: 12,000	Capacity: 18,000	Capacity: 15,000	Location of the host cities of the 2016 AFC U-23 Championship.

== Draw ==
The draw for the final tournament was held on 12 September 2015, 12:00 AST (UTC+3), at the Four Seasons Hotel in Doha, Qatar. The 16 teams were drawn into four groups of four teams. The teams were seeded according to their performance in the previous edition in 2013.

Pot 1	Pot 2	Pot 3	Pot 4
Qatar (hosts; position A1); Iraq; Saudi Arabia; Jordan	South Korea; Syria; Australia; Japan	United Arab Emirates; Iran; North Korea; Uzbekistan	China; Yemen; Thailand; Vietnam

== Match officials ==
The following referees were chosen for the 2016 AFC U-23 Championship.

Referees

- (Australia) Chris Beath
- (China) Ma Ning
- (Iran) Alireza Faghani
- (Iraq) Ali Sabah
- (Japan) Ryuji Sato
- (Jordan) Adham Makhadmeh
- (South Korea) Kim Jong-hyeok
- (Malaysia) Mohd Amirul Izwan Yaacob
- (Oman) Ahmed Al-Kaf
- (Qatar) Abdulrahman Al-Jassim
- (Saudi Arabia) Fahad Al-Mirdasi
- (Kyrgyzstan) Dmitriy Mashentsev
- (Sri Lanka) Hettikamkanamge Perera
- (United Arab Emirates) Mohammed Abdulla Hassan Mohamed
- (Uzbekistan) Ilgiz Tantashev

Assistant referees

- (Bahrain) Nawaf Moosa
- (China) Wang Dexin
- (Iran) Reza Sokhandan
- (Japan) Haruhiro Otsuka
- (Jordan) Ahmed Al Roalle
- (South Korea) Yoon Kwang-yeol
- (Malaysia) Mohd Yusri Mohamad
- (Oman) Abu Bakar Al-Amri
- (Qatar) Taleb Al-Marri
- (Qatar) Saud Al-Maqaleh
- (Saudi Arabia) Mohammed Al Abakry
- (Saudi Arabia) Abdullah Al-Shalawi
- (Kyrgyzstan) Ismailzhan Talipzhanov
- (Sri Lanka) Deniye Gedara Palitha Parakkrama Hemathunga
- (Chinese Taipei) Yu Hsu Min
- (United Arab Emirates) Mohamed Al-Hammadi
- (United Arab Emirates) Hasan Al-Mahri
- (Uzbekistan) Jakhongir Saidov

== Squads ==
Players born on or after 1 January 1993 were eligible to compete in the tournament. Each team could register a maximum of 23 players (minimum three of whom must be goalkeepers).

As the tournament was not held during the FIFA International Match Calendar, clubs were not obligated to release the players.

== Group stage ==
The top two teams of each group advanced to the quarter-finals.

Tiebreakers

The teams were ranked according to points (3 points for a win, 1 point for a draw, 0 points for a loss). If tied on points, tiebreakers would be applied in the following order:

1. Greater number of points obtained in the group matches between the teams concerned;
2. Goal difference resulting from the group matches between the teams concerned;
3. Greater number of goals scored in the group matches between the teams concerned;
4. If, after applying criteria 1 to 3, teams still have an equal ranking, criteria 1 to 3 are reapplied exclusively to the matches between the teams in question to determine their final rankings. If this procedure does not lead to a decision, criteria 5 to 9 apply;
5. Goal difference in all the group matches;
6. Greater number of goals scored in all the group matches;
7. Penalty shoot-out if only two teams are involved and they are both on the field of play;
8. Fewer score calculated according to the number of yellow and red cards received in the group matches (1 point for a single yellow card, 3 points for a red card as a consequence of two yellow cards, 3 points for a direct red card, 4 points for a yellow card followed by a direct red card);
9. Drawing of lots.

All times were local, AST (UTC+3).

=== Group A ===
Pos	Team	Pld	W	D	L	GF	GA	GD	Pts	Qualification
1	Qatar (H)	3	3	0	0	9	4	+5	9	Knockout stage
2	Iran	3	2	0	1	6	4	+2	6	Knockout stage
3	Syria	3	1	0	2	5	7	−2	3	
4	China	3	0	0	3	4	9	−5	0	

Source: AFC
Rules for classification: Group stage tiebreakers
(H) Hosts
12 January 2016
16:30

Syria	0–2	Iran
	Report	Motahari 64'; Mi. Mohammadi 72'

Jassim bin Hamad Stadium, Al Rayyan
Attendance: 1,133
Referee: Chris Beath (Australia)
12 January 2016
19:30

Qatar	3–1	China
A. Hassan 65', 72'; A. Alaa 82'	Report	Liao Lisheng 43'

Abdullah bin Khalifa Stadium, Doha
Attendance: 6,340
Referee: Kim Jong-hyeok (South Korea)

15 January 2016
16:30

China	1–3	Syria
Liao Lisheng 21'	Report	Kharbin 43' (pen.), 53'; Al Baher 83'

Abdullah bin Khalifa Stadium, Doha
Attendance: 1,205
Referee: Hettikamkanamge Perera (Sri Lanka)
15 January 2016
19:30

Iran	1–2	Qatar
A. Karimi 90+1'	Report	A. Alaa 35'; A. Hassan 56'

Jassim bin Hamad Stadium, Al Rayyan
Attendance: 11,026
Referee: Mohd Amirul Izwan (Malaysia)

18 January 2016
19:30

Qatar	4–2	Syria
A. Hassan 10'; A. Alaa 24', 82'; A. Ali 28'	Report	Kalfa 4'; Kharbin 81' (pen.)

Jassim bin Hamad Stadium, Al Rayyan
Attendance: 9,255
Referee: Ahmed Al-Kaf (Oman)
18 January 2016
19:30

Iran	3–2	China
Motahari 38'; Pahlavan 40'; Torabi 48'	Report	Chang Feiya 40'; Liao Lisheng 70' (pen.)

Abdullah bin Khalifa Stadium, Doha
Attendance: 802
Referee: Ilgiz Tantashev (Uzbekistan)

=== Group B ===
Pos	Team	Pld	W	D	L	GF	GA	GD	Pts	Qualification
1	Japan	3	3	0	0	7	1	+6	9	Knockout stage
2	North Korea	3	0	2	1	5	6	−1	2 (Note: Head-to-head: North Korea (0 GD, 5 GF), Saudi Arabia (0 GD, 4 GF), Thailand (0 GD, 3 GF))	Knockout stage
3	Saudi Arabia	3	0	2	1	5	6	−1	2	
4	Thailand	3	0	2	1	3	7	−4	2	

Source: AFC
Rules for classification: Group stage tiebreakers
Notes:
13 January 2016
16:30

Japan	1–0	North Korea
Ueda 5'	Report

Grand Hamad Stadium, Doha
Attendance: 1,531
Referee: Alireza Faghani (Iran)
13 January 2016
19:30

Saudi Arabia	1–1	Thailand
Al-Saiari 71'	Report	Pinyo 84'

Grand Hamad Stadium, Doha
Attendance: 1,531
Referee: Abdulla Hassan (United Arab Emirates)

16 January 2016
16:30

Thailand	0–4	Japan
	Report	Suzuki 27'; Yajima 49'; Kubo 75', 84' (pen.)

Grand Hamad Stadium, Doha
Attendance: 1,674
Referee: Ilgiz Tantashev (Uzbekistan)
16 January 2016
19:30

North Korea	3–3	Saudi Arabia
Kim Yong-il 27'; Yun Il-gwang 52'; Jang Kuk-chol 85'	Report	Kanno 40'; Al-Muwallad 62'; Al-Ghamdi 69'

Grand Hamad Stadium, Doha
Attendance: 1,674
Referee: Adham Makhadmeh (Jordan)

19 January 2016
16:30

Saudi Arabia	1–2	Japan
Madu 57' (pen.)	Report	Oshima 32'; Ideguchi 53'

Suheim bin Hamad Stadium, Doha
Attendance: 807
Referee: Abdulla Hassan (United Arab Emirates)
19 January 2016
16:30

North Korea	2–2	Thailand
Kim Yong-il 17'; Thossawat 45' (o.g.)	Report	Narubadin 30'; Chanathip 78'

Grand Hamad Stadium, Doha
Attendance: 1,086
Referee: Mohd Amirul Izwan (Malaysia)

=== Group C ===
Pos	Team	Pld	W	D	L	GF	GA	GD	Pts	Qualification
1	South Korea	3	2	1	0	8	2	+6	7	Knockout stage
2	Iraq	3	2	1	0	6	3	+3	7	Knockout stage
3	Uzbekistan	3	1	0	2	6	6	0	3	
4	Yemen	3	0	0	3	1	10	−9	0	

Source: AFC
Rules for classification: Group stage tiebreakers
13 January 2016
16:30

Iraq	2–0	Yemen
Faez 36' (pen.); Husni 39'	Report

Suheim bin Hamad Stadium, Doha
Attendance: 803
Referee: Ryuji Sato (Japan)
13 January 2016
19:30

South Korea	2–1	Uzbekistan
Moon Chang-jin 20' (pen.), 48'	Report	Khamdamov 57'

Suheim bin Hamad Stadium, Doha
Attendance: 803
Referee: Fahad Al-Mirdasi (Saudi Arabia)

16 January 2016
16:30

Yemen	0–5	South Korea
	Report	Kwon Chang-hoon 14', 31', 41'; Ryu Seung-woo 72'; Kim Seung-jun 76'

Suheim bin Hamad Stadium, Doha
Attendance: 686
Referee: Dmitriy Mashentsev (Kyrgyzstan)
16 January 2016
19:30

Uzbekistan	2–3	Iraq
Khamdamov 1'; Khakimov 79'	Report	Attwan 38'; Kamel 43'; Tariq 84'

Suheim bin Hamad Stadium, Doha
Attendance: 686
Referee: Ahmed Al-Kaf (Oman)

19 January 2016
19:30

Iraq	1–1	South Korea
Waleed 90+2'	Report	Kim Hyun 22'

Grand Hamad Stadium, Doha
Attendance: 1,086
Referee: Abdulrahman Al-Jassim (Qatar)
19 January 2016
19:30

Uzbekistan	3–1	Yemen
Sokhibov 18'; Sergeev 68'; Masharipov 90+3'	Report	A. Al-Sarori 82'

Suheim bin Hamad Stadium, Doha
Attendance: 227
Referee: Ma Ning (China)

=== Group D ===
Pos	Team	Pld	W	D	L	GF	GA	GD	Pts	Qualification
1	United Arab Emirates	3	2	1	0	4	2	+2	7	Knockout stage
2	Jordan	3	1	2	0	3	1	+2	5	Knockout stage
3	Australia	3	1	1	1	2	1	+1	4	
4	Vietnam	3	0	0	3	3	8	−5	0	

Source: AFC
Rules for classification: Group stage tiebreakers
14 January 2016
16:30

Jordan	3–1	Vietnam
Faisal 38', 72'; Manasrah 68'	Report	Đỗ Duy Mạnh 87'

Suheim bin Hamad Stadium, Doha
Attendance: 1,392
Referee: Ma Ning (China)
14 January 2016
19:30

Australia	0–1	United Arab Emirates
	Report	Gallifuoco 86' (o.g.)

Grand Hamad Stadium, Doha
Attendance: 307
Referee: Abdulrahman Al-Jassim (Qatar)

17 January 2016
16:30

Vietnam	0–2	Australia
	Report	Donachie 2'; Maclaren 61'

Grand Hamad Stadium, Doha
Attendance: 539
Referee: Ali Sabah (Iraq)
17 January 2016
19:30

United Arab Emirates	0–0	Jordan
	Report

Suheim bin Hamad Stadium, Doha
Attendance: 1,752
Referee: Kim Jong-hyeok (South Korea)

20 January 2016
19:30

Jordan	0–0	Australia
	Report

Suheim bin Hamad Stadium, Doha
Attendance: 2,338
Referee: Ryuji Sato (Japan)
20 January 2016
19:30

United Arab Emirates	3–2	Vietnam
Phạm Hoàng Lâm 64' (o.g.); M. Al-Akbari 74'; Al-Attas 78' (pen.)	Report	Nguyễn Công Phượng 24' (pen.); Nguyễn Tuấn Anh 68'

Grand Hamad Stadium, Doha
Attendance: 623
Referee: Fahad Al-Mirdasi (Saudi Arabia)

== Knockout stage ==
In the knockout stage, extra time and penalty shoot-out would be used to decide the winner if necessary.

=== Bracket ===
Quarter-finals
22 January – Al Rayyan
Qatar (a.e.t.)	2
North Korea	1
23 January – Doha (SBHS)
South Korea	1
Jordan	0
22 January – Doha (ABKS)
Japan (a.e.t.)	3
Iran	0
23 January – Doha (GHS)
United Arab Emirates	1
Iraq (a.e.t.)	3

Semi-finals
26 January – Al Rayyan
Qatar	1
South Korea	3
26 January – Doha (ABKS)
Japan	2
Iraq	1

Final
30 January – Doha (ABKS)
South Korea	2
Japan	3
Third place
29 January – Al Rayyan
Qatar	1
Iraq (a.e.t.)	2

=== Quarter-finals ===
22 January 2016
16:30

Japan	3–0 (a.e.t.)	Iran
Toyokawa 95'; Nakajima 108', 110'	Report

Abdullah bin Khalifa Stadium, Doha
Attendance: 1,703
Referee: Hettikamkanamge Perera (Sri Lanka)

22 January 2016
19:30

Qatar	2–1 (a.e.t.)	North Korea
A. Afif 6' (pen.); A. Assad 92'	Report	So Kyong-jin 90+1'

Jassim bin Hamad Stadium, Al Rayyan
Attendance: 9,702
Referee: Ilgiz Tantashev (Uzbekistan)

23 January 2016
16:30

South Korea	1–0	Jordan
Moon Chang-jin 23'	Report

Suheim bin Hamad Stadium, Doha
Attendance: 3,126
Referee: Alireza Faghani (Iran)

23 January 2016
19:30

United Arab Emirates	1–3 (a.e.t.)	Iraq
Mhawi 75' (o.g.)	Report	Husni 77'; Abdul-Raheem 103'; Waleed 120+3'

Grand Hamad Stadium, Doha
Attendance: 1,030
Referee: Chris Beath (Australia)

=== Semi-finals ===
Winners qualified for 2016 Summer Olympics.

26 January 2016
16:30

Japan	2–1	Iraq
Kubo 26'; Harakawa 90+3'	Report	Saad 43'

Abdullah bin Khalifa Stadium, Doha
Attendance: 1,489
Referee: Mohd Amirul Izwan (Malaysia)

26 January 2016
19:30

Qatar	1–3	South Korea
A. Alaa 79'	Report	Ryu Seung-woo 48'; Kwon Chang-hoon 89'; Moon Chang-jin 90+5'

Jassim bin Hamad Stadium, Al Rayyan
Attendance: 11,840
Referee: Hettikamkanamge Perera (Sri Lanka)

=== Third place play-off ===
Winner qualified for 2016 Summer Olympics.

29 January 2016
17:45

Qatar	1–2 (a.e.t.)	Iraq
A. Alaa 27'	Report	Abdul-Raheem 86'; Ayman 109'

Jassim bin Hamad Stadium, Al Rayyan
Attendance: 10,049
Referee: Ahmed Al-Kaf (Oman)

=== Final ===
30 January 2016
17:45

South Korea	2–3	Japan
Kwon Chang-hoon 20'; Jin Sung-wook 47'	Report	Asano 67', 81'; Yajima 68'

Abdullah bin Khalifa Stadium, Doha
Attendance: 5,394
Referee: Abdulrahman Al-Jassim (Qatar)

== Winners ==
2016 AFC U-23 Championship
(Japan)
Japan
1st title

== Awards ==
The following awards were given at the conclusion of the tournament:

Top Goalscorer	Most Valuable Player	Fair Play award
(Qatar) Ahmed Alaa	(Japan) Shoya Nakajima	Japan

== Statistics ==
=== Goalscorers ===
6 goals

- (Qatar) Ahmed Alaa

5 goals

- (South Korea) Kwon Chang-hoon

4 goals

- (Qatar) Abdelkarim Hassan
- (South Korea) Moon Chang-jin

3 goals

- (China) Liao Lisheng
- (Japan) Yuya Kubo
- (Syria) Omar Kharbin

2 goals

- (Iran) Amir Arsalan Motahari
- (Iraq) Amjad Attwan
- (Iraq) Ali Husni
- (Iraq) Mohannad Abdul-Raheem
- (Japan) Takuma Asano
- (Japan) Shoya Nakajima
- (Japan) Shinya Yajima
- (Jordan) Baha' Faisal
- (North Korea) Kim Yong-il
- (South Korea) Ryu Seung-woo
- (Uzbekistan) Dostonbek Khamdamov (Note: Including a fastest goal in the tournament)

1 goal

- (Australia) James Donachie
- (Australia) Jamie Maclaren
- (China) Chang Feiya
- (Iran) Ali Karimi
- (Iran) Milad Mohammadi
- (Iran) Ehsan Pahlavan
- (Iran) Mehdi Torabi
- (Iraq) Amjad Waleed
- (Iraq) Ali Faez Atia
- (Iraq) Ayman Hussein
- (Iraq) Mahdi Kamel
- (Iraq) Humam Tariq
- (Iraq) Saad Natiq
- (Japan) Riki Harakawa
- (Japan) Yōsuke Ideguchi
- (Japan) Ryota Oshima
- (Japan) Musashi Suzuki
- (Japan) Yuta Toyokawa
- (Japan) Naomichi Ueda
- (Jordan) Omar Manasrah
- (North Korea) Jang Kuk-chol
- (North Korea) So Kyong-jin
- (North Korea) Yun Il-gwang
- (South Korea) Kim Hyun
- (South Korea) Kim Seung-jun
- (South Korea) Jin Seong-uk
- (Qatar) Akram Afif
- (Qatar) Almoez Ali
- (Qatar) Ali Assad
- (Saudi Arabia) Abdulrahman Al-Ghamdi
- (Saudi Arabia) Fahad Al-Muwallad
- (Saudi Arabia) Mohammed Al-Saiari
- (Saudi Arabia) Mohamed Kanno
- (Saudi Arabia) Abdullah Madu
- (Syria) Yousef Kalfa
- (Syria) Mahmoud Al Baher
- (Thailand) Pinyo Inpinit
- (Thailand) Narubadin Weerawatnodom
- (Thailand) Chanathip Songkrasin
- (United Arab Emirates) Mohamed Al-Akbari
- (United Arab Emirates) Ahmed Al Attas
- (Uzbekistan) Timur Khakimov
- (Uzbekistan) Jaloliddin Masharipov
- (Uzbekistan) Igor Sergeev
- (Uzbekistan) Javokhir Sokhibov
- (Vietnam) Đỗ Duy Mạnh
- (Vietnam) Nguyễn Công Phượng
- (Vietnam) Nguyễn Tuấn Anh
- (Yemen) Ahmed Al-Sarori

1 own goal

- (Australia) Giancarlo Gallifuoco (playing against United Arab Emirates)
- (Iraq) Alaa Ali Mhawi (playing against United Arab Emirates)
- (Thailand) Thossawat Limwannasathian (playing against North Korea)
- (Vietnam) Phạm Hoàng Lâm (playing against United Arab Emirates)

Source: The-AFC.com

=== Qualified teams for Olympics ===
The following three teams from AFC qualified for the Olympic football tournament.

Team	Qualified on	Previous appearances in tournament^{1}
Japan	26 January 2016	9 (1936, 1956, 1964, 1968, 1996, 2000, 2004, 2008, 2012)
South Korea	26 January 2016	9 (1948, 1964, 1988, 1992, 1996, 2000, 2004, 2008, 2012)
Iraq	29 January 2016	4 (1980, 1984, 1988, 2004)

^{1} Italic indicates host for that year. Statistics include all Olympic format (current Olympic under-23 format started in 1992).

== Broadcasting rights ==
Territory	Channel	Ref
Arab world	beIN Sports; Al-Kass Sports	
Australia	Fox Sports	
China	CCTV	
Europe	Eurosport	
Hong Kong	Now TV	
Iran	IRIB	
Japan	NHK	
Latin America	Fox Sports	
New Zealand	Sky Sports	
South Africa	SABC	
South Korea	KBS	
Thailand	BBTV CH7	
United States	ONE World Sports	
Uzbekistan	Sport-UZ	
Vietnam	VTV	

== Controversies ==
Qatar, Syria and Yemen each had at least two players born on 1 January 1993, the cut off date for eligibility in this tournament.
