= Aboubacar Diarra =

Malian footballer

Personal information
- Full name: Aboubacar Diarra
- Date of birth: 22 May 1993 (age 33)
- Place of birth: Kayes, Mali
- Position: Midfielder

Team information
- Current team: AS Vita Club
- Number: 10

Senior career*
Years	Team	Apps	(Gls)
–2016	CO de Bamako		
2016–2017	Stade Malien		
2017	USC Kita		
2017–2019	ENPPI	33	(5)
2019–2020	Al-Shorta	2	(0)
2020	Tala'ea El Gaish	4	(0)
2020–2021	Stade Malien		
2021–2022	Djoliba AC		
2022–2023	Al-Wehdat SC		
2023	Al-Ittihad		
2023–2024	Djoliba AC		
2024–	AS Vita Club		

International career^{‡}
2017–	Mali	1	(0)
- * Club domestic league appearances and goals ‡ National team caps and goals as of 15 November 2022

Aboubacar Diarra (born 22 May 1993) is a Malian footballer who plays as a midfielder, most recently for AS Vita Club in DR Congo.

== Career statistics ==
=== International ===
As of match played 15 November 2022

Appearances and goals by national team and year
National team	Year	Apps	Goals
Mali	2022	1	0
Total		1	0

== Honours ==
=== Club ===
Stade Malien

- Malian Première Division: 2016

Al-Shorta

- Iraqi Super Cup: 2019
