= Alaa Mhawi =

Iraqi footballer

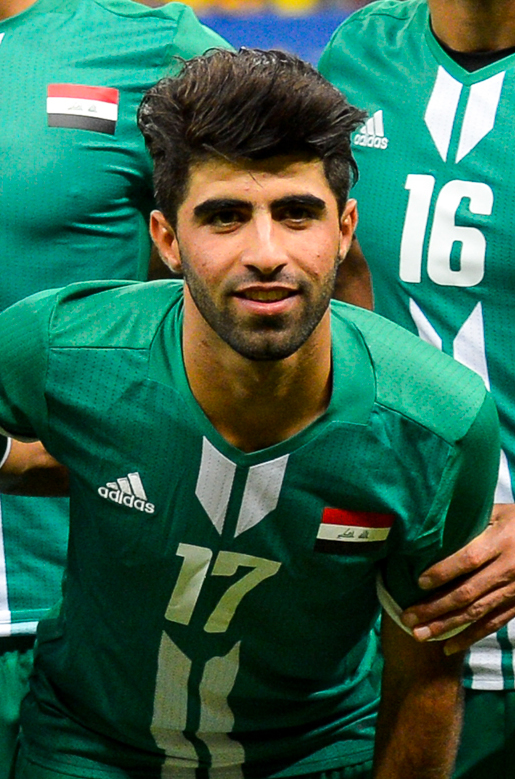

Personal information
- Full name: Alaa Ali Mhawi
- Date of birth: June 3, 1996 (age 30)
- Place of birth: Baghdad, Iraq
- Height: 1.78 m (5 ft 10 in)
- Position: Right-back

Team information
- Current team: Diyala

Youth career
- Ammo Baba School

Senior career*
Years	Team	Apps	(Gls)
2011–2015	Al-Kahraba	?	(4)
2015–2017	Al-Zawraa	?	(8)
2017	Al-Batin	2	(0)
2017–2021	Al-Shorta		
2021–2022	Al-Zawraa		
2022–2023	Al-Quwa Al-Jawiya		
2023–2024	Erbil		
2024	Al-Najaf		
2024	Al-Karkh		
2024–2025	Al-Najaf		
2025–	Diyala		

International career^{‡}
2011–2013	Iraq U17	11	(2)
2013–2014	Iraq U19	5	(2)
2015–2016	Iraq U23	16	(1)
2016–2021	Iraq	46	(0)
- * Club domestic league appearances and goals as of 18 August 2017 ‡ National team caps and goals as of 15 June 2021

Alaa Ali Mhawi (Arabic: علاء علي مهاوي; born 3 June 1996 ) is an Iraqi professional footballer who plays as a right back for Iraq Stars League club Diyala and the Iraqi national team.

== Club career ==
=== Youth career ===
Mhawi was graduated from the prestigious Ammo Baba Football School, situated opposite the Al-Shaab Stadium, one of Iraq's biggest stadiums, where he spent the early part of his football education. Many other Iraqi footballers have come out of the school such as Ali Adnan.

=== Al Kahraba ===
After leaving the Ammo Baba school, Alaa signed for Al Kahraba. His club was relegated to the Iraqi First Division League in 2013 but Alaa helped the club to promotion the following year where he scored 4 league goals as a defender.

=== Al Zawraa ===
In 2015, Mhawi signed a one-year contract for Iraqi giants Al Zawra'a. Ala'a won another league title, this time however it was the Iraqi Premier League. His impressive showing with 6 goals from the fullback position earned him a two-year contract extension.

In the 2016/17 season, Mhawi played in the AFC Cup, Asia's second-tier continental tournament. During the AFC Cup, Mhawi scored 2 goals, one coming against Syrian side Al Jaish on 4 April 2017 and the second coming in a match against defending champions Al-Quwa Al-Jawiya on 22 May 2017 in the zonal Semi-Final, where his team got knocked out. Ala'a left the team shortly before the end of the 2016/17 season, to join Saudi club Al Batin.

=== Al Batin ===
On 17 July 2017, Mhawi signed a professional contract for one season with Saudi Club Al-Batin. He made his debut on 11 August in a shock 3–1 victory over Ittihad. His contract was ended by mutual consent on 29 September 2017 after playing only two games.

=== Al Shorta ===
Following his release from Al Batin. Ali returned to Iraq, this time with Al-Shorta. He made his debut on 21 November as a second-half substitute against Karbalaa.

== International career ==
=== Iraq U-17 ===
Mhawi made his debut for Iraq's Under-17s in 2011 at the age of just 15. He played for the Under-17s over the next 3 years. He went on to make 10 more appearances for the youth side scoring 2 goals in his 11 appearances. At the age of 17, Mhawi played in the 2013 Under-17 World Cup and played in all of Iraq's matches against Sweden, Mexico and Nigeria.

=== Iraq U-19 ===
Mhawi was called up to the Iraqi Under-19 squad for the AFC Under-19 Championship qualifiers against Bangladesh and Kuwait in October 2013. He scored 20 minutes into his debut as Iraq beat Bangladesh 6-0 and played in the 0–0 draw against Kuwait which saw Iraq top the group and qualify for the 2014 AFC Under-19 Championship.

Alaa played in all 3 of Iraq's matches at the Under-19 Asian Cup in October 2014 against Oman, Qatar and North Korea. Despite Iraq having a higher goal difference and the same number of points as North Korea, they were knocked out at the group stage due to the head-to-head results. He scored his second and final goal in his fifth and final appearance for the Under-19s, which came against North Korea on 14 October 2014.

=== Iraq U-23 ===
Alaa was called up to the Iraqi Under-23 squad for the 2016 AFC Under-23 Championship qualifiers against Oman, Lebanon, Bahrain and the Maldives in March 2015. He made his debut in Iraq's 4–1 win over Lebanon and played in ever qualifier, being instrumental to Iraq's qualification to the Under-23 Asian Cup.

Alaa was part of the squad which went to Qatar for the Under-23 Asian Championship in 2016. He played in all of Iraq's matches, against South Korea, Uzbekistan, Yemen and the U.A.E. as the young side made it to the semi-final, where they were beaten by eventual champions Japan. In the third-place play-off, which Mhawi played in as well, against Qatar, Iraq won, awarding them with a spot at that summer's Olympics.

As a result of his performance at the Under-23 Asian Championship, Mhawi was included in the squad that went to Brazil for the 2016 Rio Olympics. He featured in 2 of Iraq's 3 matches as they were knocked out at the group stage, despite being unbeaten. In Iraq's match against hosts Brazil, Mhawi's direct opponent was Brazil and FC Barcelona superstar Neymar, who was expected to be the star man in a Brazil demolition. Mhawi's excellent defending, and occasional attacking, however, prevented Neymar and Brazil from scoring in a match that saw even Brazilian fans applaud the Iraqi team after the match. Mhawi was also key in Iraq's draw with South Africa in their final match as the got knocked out, despite not losing a match.

=== Iraq ===
Alaa was called up to the Iraqi senior team following his impressive performances at the Under-23 Asian Championship and the Rio 2016 Olympics. On 21 August 2016 he made his international debut and won his first cap for Iraq against North Korea in a friendly match. Alaa has gone on to play in multiple World Cup qualifiers and friendlies for Iraq, establishing himself as one of the country's best right backs.

== Personal life ==
Alaa is currently based in Baghdad. He is married and he has one daughter called Rose. His cousin is also a young professional footballer Amir Aldaraji.

== Playing Style ==
Mhawi is considered a good all-rounder by sports statisticians, statistically scoring goals and making multiple defensive plays each game that prevent other teams from achieving scoring positions.

== Statistics ==
As of 28 February 2018

National team	Caps	Goals	Assists	Yellow card
Iraq U17	11	2		
Iraq U19	5	2		
Iraq U23	12	0		1
Iraq	16	0	2	2
All	44	4	2	3

== Honors ==
=== Club ===
Al-Zawraa

- Iraqi Premier League: 2015–16
- Iraqi Super Cup: 2021

Al-Shorta

- Iraqi Premier League: 2018–19
- Iraqi Super Cup: 2019

Al-Quwa Al-Jawiya

- Iraq FA Cup: 2022–23

=== Individual ===
- Soccer Iraq Team of the Decade: 2010–2019
