= Raad Fanar =

Iraqi defender

Personal information
- Full name: Raad Fanar
- Date of birth: 25 March 1997 (age 29)
- Place of birth: Iraq
- Position: Defender

Team information
- Current team: Erbil SC

Senior career*
| Years | Team | Apps | (Gls) |
| 2017–2021 | Al-Naft | | |
| 2021- | Erbil SC | 0 | (0) |

International career^{‡}
| 2017– | Iraq U23 | 1 | (0) |
| 2018– | Iraq | 2 | (1) |
- * Club domestic league appearances and goals as of 8 May 2018 ‡ National team caps and goals as of 4 August 2018

Raad Fanar (Arabic: رَعْد فَنَر; born 25 March 1997 in Iraq) is an Iraqi defender who currently plays for Iraqi Premier League club Erbil SC.

== International career ==
On 4 May 2018, Fanar won his first international cap with Iraq against Palestine in a friendly match.

=== International goals ===
Scores and results list Iraq's goal tally first.

| # | Date | Venue | Opponent | Score | Result | Competition |
|---|---|---|---|---|---|---|
| 1. | 4 August 2018 | Faisal Al-Husseini International Stadium, Al-Ram, Palestine | Palestine | 1–0 | 3–0 | Friendly |
