= Ali Yousif =

Iraqi footballer (born 1996)

Personal information
- Full name: Ali Yousif Hashim Najatee
- Date of birth: 19 January 1996 (age 30)
- Place of birth: Baghdad, Iraq
- Height: 1.80 m (5 ft 11 in)
- Position: Forward

Team information
- Current team: Al-Talaba

Youth career
- Al-Quwa Al-Jawiya

Senior career*
Years	Team	Apps	(Gls)
2014–2019	Al-Quwa Al-Jawiya		
2016	→ Naft Al-Wasat (loan)		
2017	→ Baghdad FC (loan)		
2019–2022	Al-Shorta	33	(5)
2022–2023	Al-Zawraa		
2023–2024	Sanat Naft Abadan F.C.		
2024–2025	Al-Zawraa	21	(6)
2025–	Al-Talaba	19	(3)

International career^{‡}
2021–	Iraq	6	(1)
- * Club domestic league appearances and goals as of 20 May 2026 ‡ National team caps and goals as of 29 May 2026

Ali Yousif Hashim Najatee (Arabic: علي يوسف هاشم; born 19 January 1996) is an Iraqi professional footballer who plays as a forward for Al-Talaba and the Iraq national team.

Coming up through the youth ranks at Al-Quwa Al-Jawiya, Yousif broke into the first team in 2014, aged 18, and spent his early career with the Iraqi giants, spending the 2016-17 season out on loan at Naft Al-Wasat and Baghdad FC before returning to his parent club and establishing himself as a key player for them, winning the AFC Cup twice with the falcons, in 2017 and 2018. In 2019, he signed for defending champions Al-Shorta, allowing Yousif to play in the AFC Champions League for the first time in his career. He won his first trophy with Al-Shorta soon after joining, winning the 2019 Super Cup.

== Club career ==
=== Al-Shorta ===
In the summer of 2019, Ali signed for defending Iraqi Premier League champions Al-Shorta, coming in as the replacement for former star and fan favourite Mohanad Ali, who had left to join Qatari side Al-Duhail for a rumoured $1.2 million. In February during Al-Shorta’s Premier League match against Al-Kahrabaa, Yousif suffered a bad injury which would end his season and keep him out for no less than 6 months.

== International career ==
=== Iraq ===
Yousif received his first international call-up as part of Iraq’s 2021 FIFA Arab Cup squad. He made his debut for Iraq in their final group match against Qatar, coming off the bench.

== Statistics ==
=== International goals ===
No.	Date	Venue	Opponent	Score	Result	Competition
1.	29 May 2026	Estadi Montilivi, Girona, Spain	Andorra	1–0	1–0	Friendly

== Honours ==
=== Club ===
Al-Quwa Al-Jawiya

- AFC Cup: 2017, 2018

Al-Shorta

- Iraqi Premier League: 2021–22
- Iraqi Super Cup: 2019
