= Ali Jasim =

Iraqi footballer (born 2004)

- Ali Jasim with Iraq in 2025

Personal information
- Full name: Ali Jasim Elaibi Al-Tameemi
- Date of birth: 20 January 2004 (age 22)
- Place of birth: Baghdad, Iraq
- Height: 1.78 m (5 ft 10 in)
- Position: Winger

Team information
- Current team: Zakho
- Number: 77

Youth career
- –2018: Al-Naft

Senior career*
Years	Team	Apps	(Gls)
2018–2020	Al-Karkh		(1)
2020–2021	Al-Shorta	9	(0)
2021–2023	Al-Kahrabaa		(10)
2023	Antalyaspor	0	(0)
2023–2024	Al-Kahrabaa	0	(0)
2023–2024	→ Al-Quwa Al-Jawiya (loan)	31	(9)
2024–2026	Como	2	(0)
2025	→ Almere City (loan)	11	(1)
2025–2026	→ Al-Najma (loan)	24	(4)
2026–	Zakho	7	(0)

International career^{‡}
2018–2020	Iraq U17	4	(0)
2023	Iraq U20	10	(2)
2023–2024	Iraq Olympic	10	(8)
2023–	Iraq	41	(2)
Medal record
Men's football
Representing Iraq
AFC U-23 Asian Cup
Third place	2024 Qatar	Team
- * Club domestic league appearances and goals as of 22 October 2026 ‡ National team caps and goals as of 29 September 2026

Ali Jasim Elaibi Al-Tameemi (Arabic: علي جاسم لعيبي التميمي; born 20 January 2004) is an Iraqi professional footballer who plays as a winger for Iraq Stars League club Zakho and the Iraq national team.

== Club career ==
=== Al-Karkh ===
At 14 years old, Ali Jasim made his Iraqi Premier League debut for Al-Karkh against Al-Zawraa on 3 November 2018. He scored his first goal for the club in the last round of the 2018–19 Iraqi Premier League against Amanat Baghdad on 24 July 2019.

=== Al-Shorta ===
Ali Jasim joined the defending Iraqi Premier League champions Al-Shorta during the 2019–20 season under coach Abdul-Ghani Shahad, although the season was later abandoned due to the COVID-19 pandemic. He made his debut for Al-Shorta in the 2020–21 Iraq FA Cup, coming off the bench in a 5–0 win over Al-Khalis on 17 November 2020. Under Serbian coach Aleksandar Ilić, Jasim made one start and eight substitute appearances in the 2020–21 Iraqi Premier League as Al-Shorta finished in fourth place, and also reached the semi-finals of the Iraq FA Cup.

=== Al-Kahrabaa ===
On 28 December 2021, Jasim signed for Al-Kahrabaa. Under coach Luay Salah, Jasim scored four league goals in the 2021–22 season and a further six in the 2022–23 season, where Al-Kahrabaa finished in fifth place, the joint-highest league finish in their history which saw them qualify for the AFC Cup. Jasim also helped Al-Kahrabaa reach the Iraq FA Cup final in 2022, playing the first 60 minutes of the final, which Al-Kahrabaa lost 2–1 to Jasim's former club Al-Karkh.

After Jasim's impressive performances for the Iraq U-20 team, Jasim was close to signing for K.A.A. Gent in Belgium, and also generated interest from Turkish clubs Trabzonspor and Antalyaspor, according to journalist Fabrizio Romano.

=== Antalyaspor ===
On 20 July 2023, Jasim officially signed a three-year contract with Süper Lig side Antalyaspor. However, Jasim terminated his contract by mutual consent after only two days at the club for personal reasons, and returned to Al-Kahrabaa in Iraq.

=== Al-Quwa Al-Jawiya ===
On 2 August 2023, Jasim signed for Al-Quwa Al-Jawiya on loan from Al-Kahrabaa. He scored two goals on his debut in the 2023–24 AFC Champions League group stage in a 2–2 draw against Sepahan, and scored again in the next group match against AGMK in a 2–1 win. This made him the youngest player in history to score three goals in one AFC Champions League season at 19 years old. He scored his fourth goal of the campaign in a 2–0 win over Saudi Pro League champions Al-Ittihad.

=== Como 1907 ===
On 24 July 2024, Jasim signed for newly promoted Serie A side Como on a three-year contract.

==== Loan to Almere City ====
On 28 January 2025, Jasim was loaned to Almere City in the Dutch top tier.

==== Loan to Al-Najma ====
On 29 August 2025, Jasim joined Saudi Pro League club Al-Najma on loan.

== International career ==
=== Youth ===
Jasim participated with the Iraq U-20 team at the 2023 AFC U-20 Asian Cup. Jasim scored the winning goal in the quarter-final against rivals Iran, which qualified Iraq for the 2023 FIFA U-20 World Cup. Jasim scored again in the semi-final against Japan, which Iraq won on penalties to reach the final, with Jasim also scoring a penalty in the shootout. Iraq were beaten 1–0 by hosts Uzbekistan in the final and thus took second place in the championship.

Jasim participated in all three of Iraq's matches in the U-20 World Cup, where they lost 0–4 against Uruguay and 0–3 against Tunisia, and drew 0–0 with England, thus being eliminated at the group stage.

On 26 June 2024, Jasim was named in the Iraq U-23 team for the 2024 Summer Olympics in Paris. Jasim came on as a sub in the maiden game against Ukraine, to score the winner in the 75th minute.

=== Senior ===
Jasim made his debut for the Iraq national team on 13 October 2023 in the Jordan International Tournament against Qatar.

== Career statistics ==
=== Club ===
As of match played 25 October 2024

Appearances and goals by club, season and competition
Club	Season	League			National cup (Note: Includes Iraq FA Cup)		Continental		Total	
Club	Season	Division	Apps	Goals	Apps	Goals	Apps	Goals	Apps	Goals
Al-Shorta	2020–21	Iraq Stars League	9	0	3	0	0	0	12	0
Al-Quwa Al-Jawiya (loan)	2023–24	Iraq Stars League	31	9	3	1	5 (Note: Appearances in AFC Champions League)	4	39	14
Como	2024–25	Serie A	2	0	0	0	—		2	0
Career total			42	9	6	1	5	4	53	14

=== International ===
As of 5 September 2024

Appearances and goals by national team and year
National team	Year	Apps	Goals
Iraq	2023	4	0
Iraq	2024	10	2
Total		14	2

Scores and results list Iraq's goal tally first, score column indicates score after each Jasim goal.

List of international goals scored by Ali Jasim
No.	Date	Venue	Opponent	Score	Result	Competition
1	6 June 2024	Gelora Bung Karno Stadium, Jakarta, Indonesia	Indonesia	2–0	2–0	2026 FIFA World Cup qualification
2	11 June 2024	Basra International Stadium, Basra, Iraq	Vietnam	2–0	3–1	2026 FIFA World Cup qualification

== Honours ==
Iraq U23

- AFC U-23 Asian Cup Third Place: 2024

Individual

- AFC U-23 Asian Cup Top Goalscorer: 2024
