= Safaa Hadi =

Iraqi footballer (born 1998)

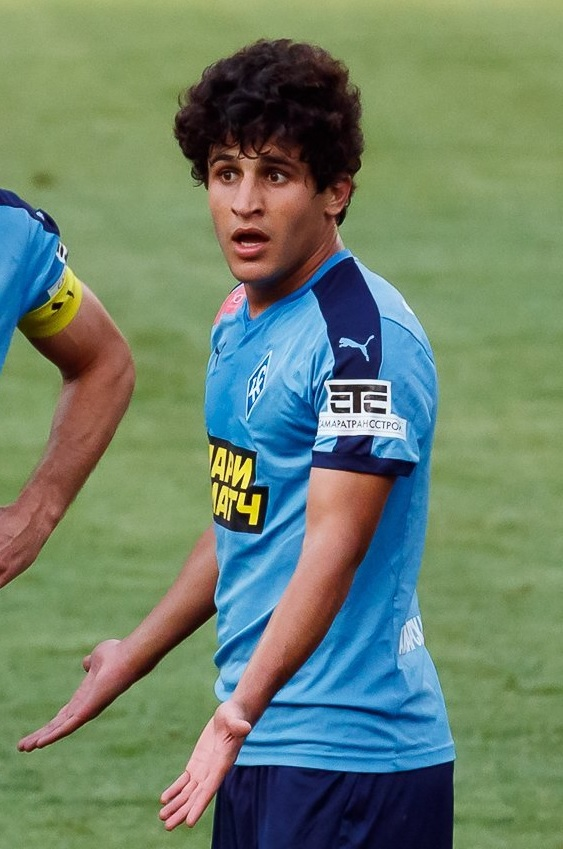
- Hadi playing for Krylia Sovetov in 2020

Personal information
- Full name: Safaa Hadi Abdullah Al-Furaiji
- Date of birth: 14 October 1998 (age 28)
- Place of birth: Baghdad, Iraq
- Height: 1.78 m (5 ft 10 in)
- Position: Defensive midfielder

Team information
- Current team: Duhok
- Number: 35

Youth career
- Ammo Baba School
- Amanat Baghdad

Senior career*
Years	Team	Apps	(Gls)
2015–2016	Amanat Baghdad		(1)
2016–2017	Al-Minaa	7	(0)
2017–2019	Al-Zawraa		(1)
2019–2020	Al-Shorta	3	(0)
2020–2021	Krylia Sovetov Samara	12	(0)
2021–2022	Al-Quwa Al-Jawiya	14	(1)
2022–2024	Tractor	48	(1)
2024–2025	Al-Quwa Al-Jawiya	24	(2)
2025	Al-Najaf	7	(0)
2026–	Duhok	8	(0)

International career^{‡}
2014–2015	Iraq U17		
2016–2017	Iraq U20	6	(0)
2017–2018	Iraq U23	6	(0)
2018–	Iraq	38	(1)
- * Club domestic league appearances and goals as of 16 April 2025 ‡ National team caps and goals as of 26 March 2024

Safaa Hadi Abdullah Al-Furaiji (Arabic: صَفَاء هَادِي عَبْد الله الْفُرَيْجِيّ, born 14 October 1998) is an Iraqi footballer who plays as a Defensive midfielder for club Duhok SC.

== Club career ==
=== Youth career ===
Safaa Hadi started in the youth system of the prestigious Ammo Baba School in Baghdad which has seen many of its graduates represent the Iraqi national team. Later, he joined Amanat Baghdad's youth team.

=== Amanat Baghdad / Al-Minaa ===
He was promoted to Amanat Baghdad the first team in 2015, representing the first team in the Iraqi Premier League in the 2015/2016 season. He scored his first league goal for Amanat Baghdad on 29 February 2016 against Al-Najaf. In June 2016, he moved to Al-Minaa where he spent the following season.

=== Al-Zawraa ===
In January 2017, Safaa signed for Iraqi giants Al-Zawraa, the most successful Iraqi club in history, where he would remain for the next two and a half seasons and establish himself as a star for the team as well as cementing himself as a first-choice midfielder for the Iraqi national team.

He won the Iraqi FA Cup in his first season with the club before winning the Iraqi Super Cup a few months later. Al-Zawraa went on to dominate the Iraqi Premier League in 2017–18 with Hadi being a key player for the team, eventually winning the 2017–2018 Iraqi Premier League title.

In 2018–2019 Safaa played in the AFC Champions League for the first time in his career as Al-Zawraa came third in their group behind Iranian club Zob Ahan and Saudi club Al-Nassr. He won the Iraqi FA Cup for the second time in his career at the end of that season, scoring the winning goal in the final which was his last game for the club.

=== Al-Shorta ===
The summer of 2019 saw Safaa heavily linked to Russian giants Zenit before eventually signing for defending Iraqi Premier League champions Al-Shorta. His debut for the club came in the 2019–20 Arab Club Champions Cup against Al-Kuwait. His next match was against his former side Al-Zawraa in the 2019 Iraqi Super Cup which Safaa won with his new club. Al-Shorta would go on to reach the quarter-finals of the Arab Club Champions Cup, the first Iraqi club to reach that stage of the competition since 2013, and Safaa also played three Iraqi Premier League games for Al-Shorta before the league was postponed. On 23 January 2020, he was allowed to leave the club and went to Turkey.

=== Krylia Sovetov Samara ===
The 2020 winter transfer window once again saw Safaa strongly linked to Russia and Zenit. On 21 February 2020, he moved to Russian Premier League side Krylia Sovetov Samara on a 2 1/2–year contract, making him the first Iraqi in history to play in the Russian Premier League.

He made his debut for Krylia Sovetov on 16 March 2020 in a game against FC Tambov, substituting Artyom Timofeyev in the 86th minute. Due to the global COVID-19 pandemic, the Russian Premier League was suspended the following day, initially until 10 April before increased cases in Russia saw the season restart further delayed until 31 May. On 15 May 2020, it was announced that the league would restart in mid-June with the fixtures and full schedule to be released at a later date. On 2 June 2020, the full calendar for the remainder of the season, including the semi-finals and the final of the 2019-20 Russian Cup which Krylia Sovetov were knocked out of by Torpedo Moscow at the Round of 32 stage, was announced with the first match back after the restart to be held in Samara on 19 June as Krylia Sovetov would host Akhmat Grozny.

Safaa was an unused substitute in the season restart as his side lost 4–2 to their relegation rivals Akhmat Grozny at home, putting them at the bottom of the league table. Krylia's next match the following weekend was away against league leaders Zenit in Saint Petersburg. Safaa once again started on the bench and came on in the 79th minute, again replacing Timofeyev, to make his second appearance for the club but was unable to prevent his team from losing to the defending champions 2–1. Following the defeat to Zenit leaving Krylia Sovetov firmly at the bottom of the table, Andrei Talalayev was brought in as the new manager in an attempt to prevent relegation. Talalaev's first match in charge would be against Russian Super Cup holders, second-placed Lokomotiv Moscow in the capital city on 30 June. Safaa made his second successive appearance, coming on for Krylia Sovetov captain Taras Burlak in the 56th minute but lasted less than 20 minutes as he was sent off for receiving two yellow cards in the space of two minutes. His team would go on to draw 1–1 against the Moscow side, keeping them in the relegation zone with 5 matches to go.

On 12 September 2021, his contract with Krylia Sovetov was terminated by mutual consent.

=== Al-Quwa Al-Jawiya ===
On the final day of the 2021 summer transfer window, defending Iraqi Premier League champions Al-Quwa Al-Jawiya announced the signing of Safaa from Krylia Sovetov on a one-year contract. He made his debut as a starter against his former club and bitter rivals Al-Zawraa in the 2021 Iraqi Super Cup.

=== Tractor ===
On July 7, 2022, Safa joined Tractor S.C. in the Persian Pro League.

== International career ==
=== Youth teams ===
Safaa first represented his country in 2014 when he was called up to the Iraq Under-17s. Over the following four years, he went on to play for the Iraq Under-20s and the Iraq Under-23s.

=== Senior team ===
On 8 May 2018, Hadi was called up to the senior national team for the first time and made his international debut against Palestine. He has since made 26 caps for the national team, including playing in the 2022 FIFA World Cup qualifiers, and was part of Iraq's 2019 AFC Asian Cup squad.

Goals for Iraq

No.	Date	Venue	Opponent	Score	Result	Competition
1.	7 June 2021	Al Muharraq Stadium, Arad, Bahrain	Cambodia	4–1	4–1	2022 FIFA World Cup qualification

== Style of play ==
Safaa is usually deployed as a defensive midfielder.

== Personal life ==
Safaa was born in Baghdad in 1998 and comes from Sadr City. His younger brother, Maitham Hadi, is also a professional footballer.

Hadi was sponsored by Puma during his time in Russia.

== Career statistics ==
Club	Season	League			Cup		Continental		Total	
Club	Season	League	Apps	Goals	Apps	Goals	Apps	Goals	Apps	Goals
Tractor	2022-23	Persian Gulf Pro League	25	1	1	0	0	0	26	1
Tractor	2023-24	Persian Gulf Pro League	17	0	0	0	1	0	18	0
Career Total			42	1	1	0	1	0	44	1

== Honours ==
=== Club ===
Al-Zawraa

- Iraqi Premier League: 2017–18
- Iraq FA Cup: 2016–17, 2018–19
- Iraqi Super Cup: 2017

Al-Shorta

- Iraqi Super Cup: 2019

Krylia Sovetov

- Russian Football National League: 2020–21
- Russian Cup runner-up: 2020-21

Al-Quwa Al-Jawiya

- Iraqi Super Cup runner-up: 2021
