= Junior Mapuku =

Congolese footballer (born 1990)

Personal information
- Full name: Junior M'Pia Mapuku
- Date of birth: 7 January 1990 (age 36)
- Place of birth: Kinshasa, Zaire
- Height: 1.87 m (6 ft 2 in)
- Position: Forward

Senior career*
Years	Team	Apps	(Gls)
2010–2011	Troyes B	14	(4)
2011	Sainte-Geneviève	5	(2)
2012–2013	Panachaiki	31	(5)
2013–2014	Compiègne	8	(0)
2014–2015	Beroe Stara Zagora	43	(16)
2015–2016	Wadi Degla	22	(3)
2016	Bandırmaspor	2	(0)
2016–2017	Beroe Stara Zagora	25	(12)
2017–2018	Levski Sofia	19	(6)
2018–2019	Shijiazhuang Ever Bright	0	(0)
2019	Dunărea Călărași	4	(0)
2019–2020	Al-Shorta	4	(0)
2020	Al-Shoulla	9	(1)
2021	Ratchaburi Mitr Phol	0	(0)
2021–2022	Slavia Sofia	5	(0)
2022–2023	Sheikh Russel KC	10	(2)
- * Club domestic league appearances and goals as of 11 February 2023

Junior M'Pia Mapuku (born 7 January 1990) is a Congolese professional footballer who most recently played as a forward for Bangladesh Premier League club Sheikh Russel KC.

== Career ==
On 1 September 2016, Mapuku signed a contract with Turkish club Bandırmaspor, but ended up playing only two league games.

On 11 October 2016, he returned to Beroe Stara Zagora.

=== Levski Sofia ===
On 22 May 2017, Mapuku signed a two-year contract with Levski Sofia, joining the team from the 2017–18 season. He soon claimed himself "The Black Power". On his debut for the club, Mapuku scored two goals in an eventual 3–1 win against Sutjeska in the Europa League 1st qualifying round. In the same match he scored the quickest goal ever for Levski in European tournaments, finding the net after just 13 seconds. On 18 August 2017, Mapuku scored his debut goals in the league against Pirin Blagoevgrad, scoring a hattrick for the 3:0 win. It was the quickest hattrick scored by a foreigner in the club history after just 18 minutes (between the 74th and 92nd minute).

=== Shijiazhuang Ever Bright ===
After being deemed surplus to the requirements by Levski Sofia manager Delio Rossi, Mapuku signed a one-and-a-half-year contract with Chinese club Shijiazhuang Ever Bright on 30 January 2018.

=== Al Shorta ===
In 2019 Mapuku joined Iraqi club Al-Shorta.

=== Slavia Sofia ===
In October 2021, Mapuku returned to Bulgaria, agreeing terms with Slavia Sofia for two seasons. However, he made only a few appearances for the team without managing to score and was released in February 2022 after falling out of favor with the manager Zlatomir Zagorčić.

== Career statistics ==
=== Club ===
As of 3 November 2018

Appearances and goals by club, season and competition
Club	Season	Division	League		Cup		Europe		Total	
Club	Season	Division	Apps	Goals	Apps	Goals	Apps	Goals	Apps	Goals
Troyes B	2010–11	National 3	14	4	–		–		14	4
Sainte-Geneviève	2011–12	National 3	5	2	–		–		5	2
Panachaiki	2011–12	Beta Ethniki	20	5	0	0	–		20	5
Panachaiki	2012–13	Beta Ethniki	11	0	0	0	–		11	0
Panachaiki	Total		31	5	0	0	0	0	31	5
Compiègne	2013–14	National 3	8	0	–		–		8	0
Beroe Stara Zagora	2013–14	A Group	12	8	0	0	0	0	12	8
Beroe Stara Zagora	2014–15	A Group	26	7	2	1	–		28	8
Beroe Stara Zagora	2015–16	A Group	5	1	0	0	4	0	9	1
Beroe Stara Zagora	Total		43	16	2	1	4	0	49	17
Wadi Degla	2015–16	Egyptian Premier League	22	3	–		–		22	3
Bandırmaspor	2016–17	1. Lig	2	0	–		–		2	0
Beroe Stara Zagora	2016–17	Bulgarian First League	25	12	0	0	–		25	12
Levski Sofia	2017–18	Bulgarian First League	19	6	3	1	4	2	26	9
Shijiazhuang	2018	China League One	0	0	0	0	–		0	0
Career total			169	48	5	2	8	2	183	52

== Honours ==
Al-Shorta

- Iraqi Super Cup: 2019
