= Karrar Jassim =

Iraqi footballer (born 1987)

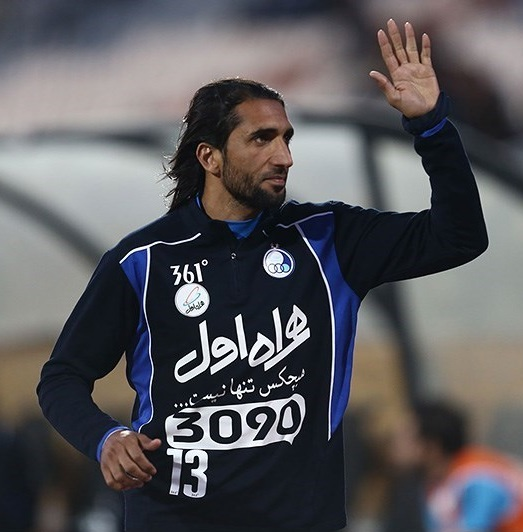
- Karrar with Esteghlal in 2015

Personal information
- Full name: Karrar Jassim Mohammed Al-Mahmoudi
- Date of birth: 11 June 1987 (age 39)
- Place of birth: Najaf, Iraq
- Height: 1.86 m (6 ft 1 in)
- Positions: Winger; attacking midfielder

Senior career*
Years	Team	Apps	(Gls)
2003–2007	Najaf		
2007–2009	Al-Wakrah	27	(9)
2009–2011	Tractor	46	(12)
2011–2012	Esteghlal	8	(0)
2012	→ Shahin Bushehr (loan)	1	(0)
2012–2013	Ajman Club	13	(2)
2013	→ Najaf (loan)	22	(5)
2013–2014	Al-Talaba	14	(6)
2014–2015	Esteghlal	29	(3)
2015–2016	Naft Al-Wasat	6	(2)
2016−2017	Tractor	24	(1)
2017–2019	Sanat Naft Abadan	34	(8)
2019–2020	Al-Shorta	27	(2)
2020–2021	Naft Al-Wasat		
2021–2022	Naft Masjed Soleyman	8	(1)
2022–2025	Naft Al-Wasat		
Total		259	(51)

International career
2006–2007	Iraq U23	28	(6)
2007–2015	Iraq	66	(6)
- * Club domestic league appearances and goals

Karrar Jassim Mohammed Al-Mahmoudi (Arabic: كَرَّار جَاسِم مُحَمَّد الْمَحْمُودِيّ, born 11 June 1987) known as Karrar Jassim, is an Iraqi former professional footballer, who played for the Iraq national team.

== Club career ==
Impressive displays for Najaf in the 2007 AFC Champions League, where he scored two goals in six matches, earned Karrar Jassim Mohammed a move to Qatar where he signed for Al Wakra at the start of June 2007. In 2009 Karrar signed for Iranian side Tractor S.C. for one season. During a Tractor match, Karrar was banned for 9 games following an incident in which he slapped the match assistant referee. The ban was later reduced to 5 and eventually to 3 games. He was released in May 2011 by Tractor for his disrespectful behavior toward referees. On 4 June 2011, Karrar joined the Tehran-based football team Esteghlal on a two-years contract. The 24-year-old striker has joined Esteghlal but he was fired in January 2012 during mid-season after a dispute with midfielder, and team vice-captain Mojtaba Jabbari. He then loaned to Shahin Bushehr and then moved to Ajman and a loan to Najaf.

On 4 July 2014, Karrar returned to Esteghlal with signing a two-year contract. Jassim left the club by mutual consent on 29 November 2015 after prolonged financial problems with the Iranian club.

== International career ==
Karrar scored three goals for the Iraq Olympic team in the Asian Qualifiers for the 2008 Olympic Games, including winning goals against Thailand and DPR Korea. Karrar Jassim also scored a goal against Australia for the national team in the 2007 Asian Cup and also scored the winner against North Korea in the Asian Cup 2011 which sent Iraq through to the last eight.

== Career statistics ==
=== Club statistics ===
Club performance			League		Cup		Continental		Total	
Season	Club	League	Apps	Goals	Apps	Goals	Apps	Goals	Apps	Goals
Qatar			League		Emir of Qatar Cup		Asia		Total	
2007–08	Al-Wakrah	Qatar Stars League	10	1	0	0	–	–	10	1
2008–09	Al-Wakrah	Qatar Stars League	17	8	1	0	–	–	18	8
Iran			League		Hazfi Cup		Asia		Total	
2009–10	Tractor	Iran Pro League	19	4	0	0	–	–	19	4
2010–11	Tractor	Iran Pro League	27	8	0	0	–	–	27	8
2011–12	Esteghlal	Iran Pro League	8	0	2	0	0	0	10	0
2011–12	Shahin	Iran Pro League	1	0	1	0	–	–	2	0
United Arab Emirates			League		Emirates Cup		Asia		Total	
2012–13	Ajman	UAE Pro League	13	2	3	1	–	–	16	3
Iraq			League		Iraq FA Cup		Asia		Total	
2012–13	Najaf	Iraqi Premier League	22	5	0	0	–	–	22	5
Iran			League		Hazfi Cup		Asia		Total	
2014–15	Esteghlal	Iran Pro League	23	3	2	3	–	–	25	6
2015–16	Esteghlal	Iran Pro League	6	0	0	0	–	–	6	0
2016–17	Tractor	Iran Pro League	23	1	4	0	–	–	27	1
2017–18	Sanat Naft	Iran Pro League	24	7	4	0	–	–	28	7
2018–19	Sanat Naft	Iran Pro League	10	1	3	4	–	–	13	5
Total	Qatar		27	9	1	0	0	0	28	9
Total	Iran		150	25	16	7	0	0	166	32
Total	United Arab Emirates		13	2	3	1	0	0	16	3
Total	Iraq		22	5	0	0	0	0	22	5
Career total			212	41	20	8	0	0	232	49

- Assist Goals

Season	Team	Assists
09–10	Tractor	1
10–11	Tractor	8
11–12	Esteghlal	1
14–15	Esteghlal	10

=== International goals ===
#	Date	Venue	Opponent	Score	Result	Competition
1.	13 July 2007	Rajamangala National Stadium, Bangkok	Australia	3–1	Win	2007 AFC Asian Cup
2.	13 July 2009	Al-Shaab Stadium, Baghdad	Palestine	4–0	Win	Friendly
3.	19 January 2011	Ahmed bin Ali Stadium, Al Rayyan	North Korea	1–0	Win	2011 AFC Asian Cup
4.	29 February 2012	Grand Hamad Stadium, Doha	Singapore	7–1	Win	2014 FIFA World Cup qualification
5.	28 May 2012	Ahmed bin Ali Stadium, Al Rayyan	Botswana	1–1	Draw	Friendly
6.	19 November 2013	Gelora Bung Karno Stadium, Jakarta	Indonesia	2–0	Win	2015 AFC Asian Cup qualification

== Honours ==
Shahin Bushehr

- Hazfi Cup runner-up: 2011–12

Al-Shorta

- Iraqi Premier League: 2018–19
- Iraqi Super Cup: 2019

Iraq

- Asian Games silver medal: 2006
- AFC Asian Cup: 2007
- Arab Nations Cup bronze medal: 2012
