= Saad Abdul-Amir =

Iraqi footballer (born 1992)

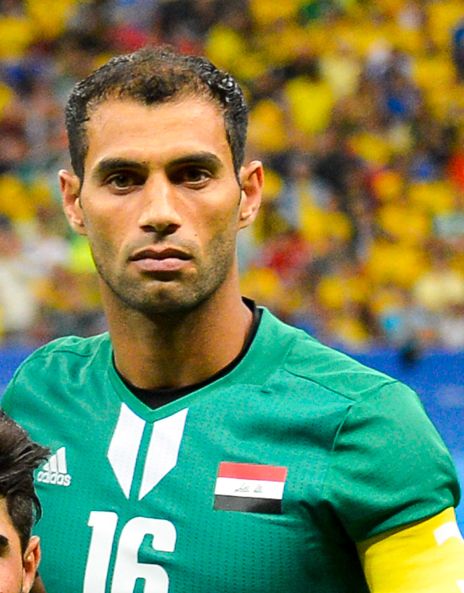
- Saad with Iraq at the 2016 Summer Olympics

Personal information
- Full name: Saad Abdul-Amir Al-Zirjawi
- Date of birth: 19 January 1992 (age 34)
- Place of birth: Baghdad, Iraq
- Height: 1.80 m (5 ft 11 in)
- Position: Defensive midfielder

Team information
- Current team: Al-Quwa Al-Jawiya
- Number: 25

Youth career
- 2006–2008: Al-Karkh

Senior career*
| Years | Team | Apps | (Gls) |
| 2008–2010 | Al-Karkh | | |
| 2010–2015 | Erbil SC | | |
| 2015–2017 | Al-Qadisiyah | 38 | (7) |
| 2017 | Al-Ahli | 10 | (1) |
| 2017–2018 | Al-Shabab | 18 | (3) |
| 2018–2021 | Al-Shorta | 56 | (5) |
| 2021–2023 | Al-Zawraa | | |
| 2023– | Al-Quwa Al-Jawiya | 100 | (20) |

International career^{‡}
| 2011–2014 | Iraq U23 | 4 | (0) |
| 2016 | Iraq Olympic (O.P.) | 3 | (1) |
| 2010–2024 | Iraq | 86 | (4) |
- * Club domestic league appearances and goals as of 10 September 2018 ‡ National team caps and goals as of 28 December 2024

Saad Abdul-Amir Luaibi Al-Zirjawi (Arabic: سعد عبدالامير لعيبي الزيرجاوي; born 19 January 1992) is an Iraqi defensive midfielder who plays for Al-Quwa Al-Jawiya. Saad started his career in his hometown club Al-Karkh SC. In 2010, he transferred to Northern Iraqi side Erbil SC, spending 5 years at the club where he won the 2011–12 Iraqi Premier League. In 2015, he made his first move abroad, signing for Saudi side Al-Qadisiyah. He moved to Al-Shabab in 2017.

== Club career ==
=== Early career ===
Saad began playing for shaabiya teams in the Shuala district of Baghdad, then with the Al-Shuala club juniors and Al-Kadhimiya before joining Al-Karkh, guiding them to promotion back to the top flight in 2010.

Saad came into the international fold in 2010 after impressing for the Iraqi School team. In the summer of 2010, weeks after he had won the Arab School Championship in Beirut with the Iraqi School team beating Egypt 2–1 in the final, Saad was included in Wolfgang Sidka’s first squad and was one of only three players from the initial preliminary squad that was selected for the final 2010 WAFF Championship squad. The retirement of Qusay Munir and career threatening injury to Muthanna Khalid saw Saad become Iraq's most experienced player in midfield in the run-up to the 2015 AFC Asian Cup, four years after he had sat on the bench at the 2011 tournament in Doha watching Qusay and Nashat Akram organising the midfield. In Australia at the 2015 Asian Cup, Saad formed a strong midfield partnership with Swindon Town's Yaser Kasim that was one of the reasons for Iraq reaching the semi-finals.

=== Al-Karkh ===
Saad was handed his debut aged just 16 in 2008, he played for 3 seasons in the Iraqi Second division and Iraqi Premier League where his defensive prowess and short passing ability earned him a transfer to Kurdish side Erbil. Saad Played 40 times for Al Karkh by the time he was 18.

=== Erbil ===
Saad Joined Erbil in 2010, it is there where his performances earned him his first call up to the national side. Saad remained at the club for 5 years, winning the league title once and finishing runner up in the AFC Cup Twice. He moved to Al Qadisiyah in 2015.

=== Al-Qadisiyah ===
- 2015/2016

Saad Moved to Al-Qadisiyah in summer 2015 on a one-year contract and was handed the number 25 Shirt. Saad started often in the defensive midfield position or the Right midfield Position, he also played at right back and centre back. He made his debut on the 22nd of August, starting in the 1–0 win vs Al-Faisaly. Saad scored his first goal on 28 November 2015 in a 1–1 draw vs Hajer Club. He also successfully converted a penalty in April for the 2–0 win Vs Al-Shabab. He then scored in the following match day vs Najran in the 4–2 win, scoring in back to back matches for the first time in his career, he repeated that feat later in the season when he scored against Al-Fateh and Al-Khaleej. Saad ended the campaign with 5 goals, his best ever tally in a single season. Saad was widely considered as one of the best defensive midfielders in the league by Saudi fans and his efforts in keeping his club in the top flight was rewarded with a contract extension.

- 2016/2017

In his second season, Saad Returned after the Olympic games to Al-Qadisiyah and participated in Match day two against Al-Faisaly in the right midfield position and provided an assist. He continued to be a starter in the team until match day Seven match against Al-Taawon as he was suspended due to a red card in the matchday six game against Al-Batin. Saad returned as a starter to the squad on matchday nine and remained in the squad until the end of the first term where he alternated between playing in the defensive midfielder position and the right midfield position. Saad scored on back to back matches, firstly in the 5–2 victory over Al Wahda, where he also provided an assist. Followed by a goal vs Al Shabab in a 1–1 draw. in winter 2017 moved to Al-Ahli.

=== Al-Ahli ===
Saad made the switch on January 15, 2017, to Al-Ahli replace Luíz Carlos in a transfer fee of a million euro to the club. contract that will run until 2018.

He made his debut on January 20 of 2017 in the Saudi King Cup against Al-Shoulla as a second-half substitute. Abdulemir made his first start and league debut against Al-Shabab on January 27. He scored his first goal for Al Ahli in the round of 16 cup match against his old club Al-Qadsiah on February 13. He was sent off on the Feb 17 league match vs Al-Nassr. Al Ahli failed to win the title as they lost out to rivals Al Hilal. They also lost the King's cup in the final to the same opposition. However they reached the Quarter final of the Asian Champions League, to end the season on a high. The player was released in August 2017, to make way for other new signings.

=== Al-Shabab ===
Saad Abdul-Emir signed for Al-Shabab on a free transfer on August 9. The club signed him on a one-season contract. He made his debut against former club Al-Qadsiah FC on August 19.

== Statistics ==
As of 29 May 2017

| Club | Season | Saudi Premier League | | Crown Prince Cup | | Saudi Champions Cup | | Saudi Super Cup | | AFC Champions League | | Total | |
| Club | Season | Apps | Goals | Apps | Goals | Apps | Goals | Apps | Goals | Apps | Goals | Apps | Goals |
|---|---|---|---|---|---|---|---|---|---|---|---|---|---|
Al-Ahli
| Al-Ahli | 2016–17 | 10 | 1 | 0 | 0 | 5 | 2 | 0 | 0 | 8 | 1 | 23 | 4 |
| Career total | | 10 | 1 | 0 | 0 | 5 | 2 | 0 | 0 | 8 | 1 | 23 | 4 |

== Style of play ==
Saad is a Defensive and centre midfielder. He excels in positioning and close range ball control. Saad has also been praised for his leadership qualities.

== International career ==
In 2010 he was included in German Wolfgang Sidka’s first squad and was one of only three players from an initial 26 players that was selected for the final 2010 WAFF Championship squad, and made his debut in a 3-2 friendly win over Oman national football team, prior to the tournament, which Iraq won the match 3–2. With the likes of Qusay Munir, Salih Sadir and Nashat Akram blocking his way, Saad had to play understudy to the 2007 Asian Cup winners for most of his time with the national side.

Saad scored his first goal for the national team in 2013 in a 1-1 draw with Yemen. Saad was in the Squad for the 2011 AFC Asian Cup in Qatar, as well as the 2015 AFC Asian Cup in Australia.

=== Rio 2016 ===
Abdul-Amir was selected as one of the 3 over 23 players in Football at the 2016 Summer Olympics – Men's tournament. He was the captain in all three games and scored Iraq's Only Goal in the final group game against South Africa. Iraq Crashed out of the tournament finishing third in the group with 3 draws.

=== Iraq U-23 ===
| # | Date | Venue | Opponent | Score | Result | Competition |
|---|---|---|---|---|---|---|
| 1. | 10 August 2016 | Arena Corinthians, São Paulo, Brazil | South Africa | 1–1 | 1–1 | 2016 Summer Olympics |

=== National team ===
Scores and results list Iraq's goal tally first.

| # | Date | Venue | Opponent | Score | Result | Competition |
|---|---|---|---|---|---|---|
| 1. | 8 October 2013 | Saida Municipal Stadium, Beirut | Yemen | 1–1 | 1–1 | Friendly |
| 2. | 6 October 2016 | Saitama Stadium, Saitama | Japan | 1–1 | 1–2 | 2018 FIFA World Cup qualification |
| 3. | 18 March 2017 | Azadi Stadium, Tehran | Iran | 1–0 | 1–0 | Friendly |
| 4. | 31 August 2017 | Rajamangala Stadium, Bangkok | Thailand | 2–1 | 2–1 | 2018 FIFA World Cup qualification |

== Honours ==
=== Club ===
Erbil SC

- Iraqi Premier League: 2011–12
- AFC Cup runners-up: 2012, 2014

Al-Shorta

- Iraqi Premier League: 2018–19
- Iraqi Super Cup: 2019

Al-Zawraa

- Iraqi Super Cup: 2021

Al-Quwa Al-Jawiya

- Iraq Stars League: 2025–26

=== International ===
Iraq

- WAFF Championship runner-up: 2012
- AFC Asian Cup fourth-place: 2015

=== Individual ===
- Soccer Iraq Team of the Decade: 2010–2019
- Soccer Iraq Goal of the Season: 2019–20
