= Waleed Salim Al-Lami =

Iraqi footballer

Waleed Salim
Personal information
- Full name: Waleed Salim Edwareej Al-Lami
- Date of birth: 5 January 1992 (age 34)
- Place of birth: Mosul, Iraq
- Height: 1.74 m (5 ft 9 in)
- Position: Right back

Senior career*
Years	Team	Apps	(Gls)
2009–2012	Al-Kahraba		(2)
2012	→ Erbil (loan)		(0)
2012–2020	Al-Shorta		(11)
2020–2021	Zakho		(0)
2021	Naft Al-Wasat		(0)
2021–2023	Al-Shorta	10	(0)
Total		–	(13)

International career^{‡}
2007–2009	Iraq U17		
2009–2010	Iraq U20	3	(0)
2012–2013	Iraq U23	2	(0)
2012–2019	Iraq	51	(1)
- * Club domestic league appearances and goals as of 1 September 2023 ‡ National team caps and goals as of 1 September 2023

Waleed Salim Al-Lami (Arabic: وليد سالم اللامي Walīd Sālim Al-'Alāmī; born 5 January 1992) is an Iraqi former professional footballer who played as a right back for Al-Shorta and the Iraq national team.

== International career ==
On 11 September 2012, Salim made his debut for the Iraq national team, starting against Japan in the 2014 FIFA World Cup qualification, which ended in a 1–0 defeat.

=== Iraq national team goals ===
Scores and results list Iraq's goal tally first.

#	Date	Venue	Opponent	Score	Result	Competition
1	30 January 2015	Newcastle Stadium, Newcastle, Australia	United Arab Emirates	1–1	2–3	2015 AFC Asian Cup

== Honours ==
=== Club ===
Al-Shorta

- Iraqi Premier League: 2012–13, 2018–19, 2021–22, 2022–23
- Iraqi Super Cup: 2019

=== International ===
Iraq

- WAFF Championship: Runner-up 2012
- Arabian Gulf Cup: Runner-up 2013
- AFC U-22 Championship: 2013
- Asian Games: Bronze medalist 2014

== Personal life ==
Salim is a Shia Muslim and has a tattoo of Ali ibn Abi Talib on his bicep.
