= Nabeel Sabah =

Iraqi footballer

Personal information
- Date of birth: 1 July 1990 (age 36)
- Place of birth: Baghdad, Iraq
- Height: 1.74 m (5 ft 9 in)
- Positions: Left winger; left back; attacking midfielder

Team information
- Current team: Al-Kahrabaa SC
- Number: 80

Senior career*
Years	Team	Apps	(Gls)
2007–2010	Al-Kahrabaa		
2010–2015	Erbil		
2015–2018	Al-Shorta		(4)
2018–2019	Al-Talaba		
2019–2020	Al-Shorta	6	(1)
2020–2021	Naft Al-Wasat		
2021–2024	Amanat Baghdad	2	(3)
2024–	Al-Kahrabaa SC		

International career^{‡}
2011	Iraq U23	6	(1)
2012–2017	Iraq	12	(0)
- * Club domestic league appearances and goals as of 19 May 2024 @ 11:28AM(AEST) ‡ National team caps and goals as of January 18, 2013

Nabeel Sabah Zghaiyer Al-Helechi (Arabic: نبيل صباح زغير الهليجي, born 1 July 1990) is an Iraqi footballer who plays as a winger or full-back and sometimes as an attacking midfielder for Amanat Baghdad, in Iraqi Premier League, and for the Iraq national team.

== International debut ==
In November 14, 2012, Nabeel Sabah made his International debut against Jordan in the 2014 FIFA World Cup qualification, which ended in a 1-0 win for Iraq.

== Honours ==
Erbil

- 2011–12 Iraqi Premier League winner
- 2012 AFC Cup runners-up

Al-Shorta

- 2019 Iraqi Super Cup winner

Iraq

- 2012 WAFF Championship: runner-up
- 21st Arabian Gulf Cup: runner-up
