= Sherko Karim =

Iraqi footballer (born 1996)

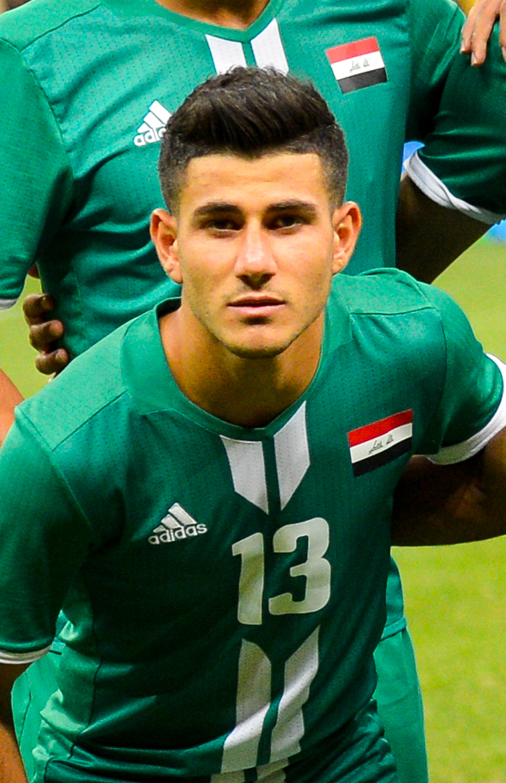
- Karim with Iraq U23 in 2016

Personal information
- Full name: Sherko Karim Lateef Gubari
- Date of birth: 25 May 1996 (age 30)
- Place of birth: Kirkuk, Iraq
- Height: 1.77 m (5 ft 10 in)
- Position: Forward

Team information
- Current team: Zakho SC
- Number: 10

Youth career
- –2011: Kirkuk
- 2011–2012: Al-Shorta

Senior career*
Years	Team	Apps	(Gls)
2012–2015	Al-Shorta		(3)
2015–2019	Grasshoppers	14	(0)
2017–2018	→ FC Vaduz (loan)	0	(0)
2018–2019	→ Rheindorf Altach (loan)	11	(0)
2019–2020	Al-Shorta	1	(0)
2020–2022	Erbil		
2022–2023	Kuwait SC		
2023–2025	Erbil		
2025–	Zakho SC	5	(4)

International career^{‡}
2011–2013	Iraq U17	11	(5)
2013–2014	Iraq U20	4	(4)
2016	Iraq U23	3	(0)
2021–	Iraq	26	(1)
- * Club domestic league appearances and goals as of 5 August 2023 ‡ National team caps and goals as of 18 November 2025

Sherko Karim Lateef Gubari (Arabic: شيركو كريم لطيف, born 25 May 1996) is an Iraqi professional footballer who plays as a forward for Iraq Stars League club Zakho SC and the Iraq national team.

== Early life ==
Born into a Kurdish family in Kirkuk, Karim made his first steps on the fields of local Al-Thawra SC in his home city. He was discovered by Iraqi U-17 coach Muwafaq Hussein on one of his scouting trips scouring for new talent around the country, and after watching him, he quickly called him up to play for his side, and shortly after, moved to Baghdad to play for Al-Shorta. It was after the U-16s qualified for the 2012 AFC U-16 Championship that Iraqi clubs began clamouring for his signature, with Erbil SC one of the favourites to sign the striker but instead he moved south to the Iraqi capital to start his career in the top division, and after an initial offer from Al-Karkh, he moved to Al-Shorta.

Karim came to prominence at Arab Cup U-17 in Tunisia in 2012, where he picked up awards for the best player and top scorer at the 2012 Arab Youth Championship on the back of his seven goals in Tunis. After the competition the striker was offered a professional contract by three of Tunisia's premier clubs Espérance, Club Africain and CS Sfaxien. Karim also had interest from Saudi club Al-Nassr and was one of four players from the Under 17s who Russian club Anzhi Makhachkala looked out during the 2013 AFC U-17 qualifying rounds in Duhok.

== Club career ==
=== Al-Shorta ===
Karim signed his first senior contract with Al-Shorta on 30 December 2011 at the age of just 15. He was given the number 33 shirt and scored his first goal for Al-Shorta against Al-Minaa with a header in a 3–0 win on 24 June 2012. He was given the number 7 shirt at the start of the 2012–13 season and he won the league with Al-Shorta that season. He scored twice in the 2013–14 season against Al-Quwa Al-Jawiya and Baghdad.

=== Ajax trial ===
In 2013 after Karim scored two goals in an AFC Youth Championship qualifier against Bangladesh in Erbil, which Iraq won 6–0, the opponent's Dutch coach Rene Koster was full of praise for the Iraq Under 19s, and told the gathering media that the Iraqi team “deserved the victory, deserving for being cognate as a group, playing at home, in front of their fans, and playing in a similar way to Barcelona”. Karim caught the eye of the Dutch coach, and he was quickly on the phone to one club back in the Netherlands to inform them about the No.7 of Iraq.

On 13 October 2013, after the last day of the qualifying stages, his coach Muwafaq Hussein confirmed to the Iraqi media that Karim had received a formal offer of a two-week trial from Dutch club Ajax Amsterdam through Bangladesh's coach Koster who also worked as a coach at the Ajax Football Academy. The Iraqi coach added that Karim's club would make a decision on holding talks to agree on the details of the transfer but the player was unable to travel to Amsterdam due to visa issues.

=== Move to Europe ===
At the end of 2014, Karim finally received his visa and flew to Paris and had trials at French clubs Montpellier, Valenciennes, Marseille and AS Monaco, where it was reported that he was close to signing a deal, though an Iraqi journalist claimed Monaco pulled out of a three-year deal.

In February 2015, Karim signed a two-and-a-half-year contract with Swiss club Grasshopper Club Zürich and went straight into their youth side. He made his competitive debut in a 5–3 win over FC Thun in the 2015–16 Swiss Super League, coming on as a substitute wearing the number 25 shirt. In 2016 Karim scored a goal in the final of the 79th edition of the Blue Stars/FIFA Youth Cup in Zürich in a 2–0 victory of English club West Ham United and was awarded the Adidas Golden Ball as the competition's best player.

In July 2017, Karim signed for FC Vaduz on loan from Grasshopper Club Zürich to get more playing time.

=== Back to Iraq ===
In the 2019 summer transfer window, Karim returned to his former club Al-Shorta and won the 2019 Iraqi Super Cup title.

== International career ==
His delay in Karim making his full international debut centred around the striker's clash with the FA and his U-19 coach while he was with the Iraq youth side in Myanmar when Karim had been selected to play at the 2014 AFC U-19 Championship. In the second half of the group game against Qatar when his coach Rahim Hameed turned to bring the young forward on, but was told by his two assistants that Karim had left the bench and was sitting in the stands! The player insisted he had informed the two coaching assistants that he was not in the right state of mind to play and later claimed he was physically assaulted by the coach after the game for what was perceived as his obdurate stance. Karim had been waiting in the city of Erbil for a visa to fly to France for trials with several clubs when he was called up by the Iraq FA. Before the youth tournament the player had been told he would be suspended and his ITC clearance would not be released wrecking any move to Europe if he refused a call-up from the Iraq U-19s side. Karim swiftly made himself available and arrived a day before they departed.

On the eve of the final 2016 Olympic qualifying round in Doha in January 2016, Karim left the team after his club refused to allow him to take part.

== Career statistics ==
Scores and results list Iraq's goal tally first, score column indicates score after each Karim goal.

List of international goals scored by Sherko Karim
No.	Date	Venue	Opponent	Score	Result	Competition
1	29 March 2021	Milliy Stadium, Tashkent	Uzbekistan	1–0	1–0	Friendly

== Honors ==
Al-Shorta

- Iraqi Premier League: 2012–13
- Iraqi Super Cup: 2019

Kuwait SC

- Kuwait Super Cup: 2022

Iraq

- Arabian Gulf Cup: 2023
