= Ali Faez =

Iraqi footballer

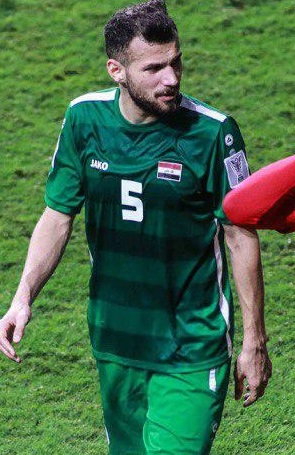
- Faez playing for Iraq at 2019 AFC Asian Cup

Personal information
- Full name: Ali Faez Atiyah
- Date of birth: 9 September 1994 (age 32)
- Place of birth: Baghdad, Iraq
- Height: 1.87 m (6 ft 2 in)
- Position: Defender

Team information
- Current team: Al-Gharraf

Youth career
- 2009–2010: Al-Talaba

Senior career*
Years	Team	Apps	(Gls)
2010–2011	Al-Sinaa	20	(2)
2011–2013	Al-Karkh	39	(1)
2013–2015	Erbil SC	22	(1)
2015–2016	Al-Shorta		(5)
2016–2019	Çaykur Rizespor	14	(0)
2017–2018	→ Al-Shorta (loan)	24	(1)
2018–2019	→ Al-Kharaitiyat (loan)	0	(0)
2019–2021	Al-Shorta	33	(3)
2021–2022	Qadsia SC	15	(1)
2022–24	Al-Talaba		
2024–2026	Al-Najaf SC	10	(1)
2026–	Al-Gharraf		

International career^{‡}
2009–2010	Iraq U17		
2011–2013	Iraq U20	13	(2)
2012–2016	Iraq U23	4	(1)
2013–	Iraq	54	(4)
- * Club domestic league appearances and goals as of 26 July 2021 ‡ National team caps and goals as of 7 December 2025

Ali Faez Atiyah (Arabic: عَلِيّ فَايِز عَطِيَّة or فَائِز Iraqi Arabic [ˈʕɑli ˈfɑːjəz ʕɐˈt̪ˠɪjjɐ]; born 9 September 1994) is an Iraqi footballer and Olympian who plays as a defender for Iraq Stars League club Al-Gharraf and the Iraq national team. He has established himself as a 'dead ball' specialist or setpiece taker.

== Club career ==
The former graduate of the Ammo Baba Football School was born in 1994 and first made his league debut for Al-Sinaa and then Al-Karkh where he became a regular in one of the Iraqi league's youngest team before he moved north to four-time Iraqi league winners Erbil SC halfway through the 2012–2013 season for a 1 1/2-year deal worth 40m Iraqi dinars. before he joined Al Shorta.

Ali has played at every age group level for the Iraqi national team from U-14s to the senior team and by the age of just 21 had already represented Iraq at the Asian Cup, the WAFF Championship and the Gulf Cup.

In July 2016 Ali signed for Turkish Team Çaykur Rizespor. However, after a season which saw limited playing time and a relegation from the Süper Lig, Ali made his debut on August 20, 2016, as a center back playing the full 90 minutes against Konyaspor. Ali requested to leave the club, which was granted by a loan to former club Al Shorta.

In June 2018, he signed a one-year contract with Al Kharaitiyat SC.

Ali supported Al-Zawraa while he was growing up and cites Spanish midfielder Xabi Alonso as his favourite player and is a Real Madrid fan. The defender, a dead-ball specialist, taking both free-kicks and penalties, can be deployed in the centre of defence, at right back and as a defensive midfielder.

== International career ==
Ali is one of a select few to have played at every level for Iraq from Ishbal (Cubs) to the senior side after making his international debut last year in the 6–0 defeat to Chile in Copenhagen. On 14 August 2013, Ali played his first international match for Iraq against Chile in a friendly match. When he was handed his international debut by Serbian Vladimir Petrović in 2013 at the age of 18 years, 11 months and 5 days, he became one of the youngest players to represent Iraq. However, he was given a baptism of fire in his first game when he came up against Chilean stars Alexis Sánchez and Arturo Vidal – a game which ended in a 6–0 defeat at the Brøndby Stadion in Copenhagen. Ali scored his first goal for the senior side against Qatar in the Arabian Gulf Cup with a sublime free-kick., he scored a penalty on the following match to score in two back-to-back games.

=== International goals ===
Scores and results list Iraq's goal tally first.

#	Date	Venue	Opponent	Score	Result	Competition
1.	26 December 2017	Al Kuwait Sports Club Stadium, Kuwait City	Qatar	1–1	2–1	23rd Arabian Gulf Cup
2.	29 December 2017	Al Kuwait Sports Club Stadium, Kuwait City	Yemen	2–0	3–0	23rd Arabian Gulf Cup
3.	10 September 2018	Ali Sabah Al-Salem Stadium, Al-Farwaniyah	Kuwait	2–1	2–2	Friendly
4.	30 December 2022	Al-Minaa Olympic Stadium, Basra	Kuwait	1–0	1–0	Friendly

== Honours ==
Al-Shorta

- Iraqi Super Cup: 2019

Iraq

- AFC Asian Cup fourth-place: 2015
- Arabian Gulf Cup: 2023

Iraq U-23

- AFC U-22 Championship: 2013

Iraq U-20

- AFC U-19 Championship runner-up: 2012
- FIFA U-20 World Cup 4th-place: 2013
