= Saad Natiq =

Iraqi footballer

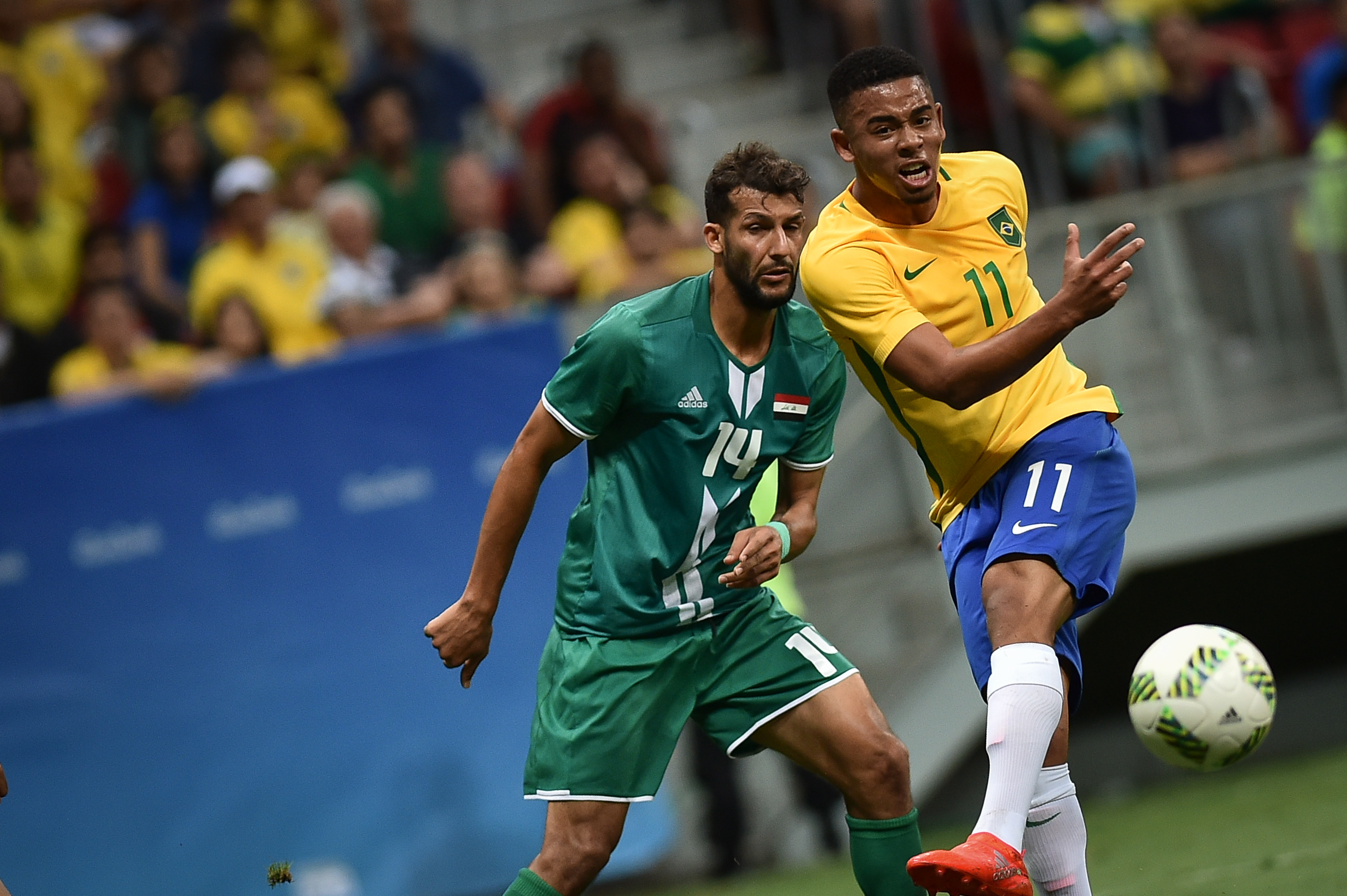

Personal information
- Full name: Saad Natiq Naji
- Date of birth: 19 March 1994 (age 32)
- Place of birth: Al-Najaf, Iraq
- Height: 1.88 m (6 ft 2 in)
- Positions: Center back; defensive midfielder

Team information
- Current team: Al-Minaa
- Number: 4

Youth career
- Al-Najaf FC

Senior career*
Years	Team	Apps	(Gls)
2011–2014	Masafi Al-Wasat		(1)
2014–2017	Al-Quwa Al-Jawiya		(3)
2017–2018	Al-Arabi	21	(3)
2018–2019	Al-Quwa Al-Jawiya		(5)
2019–2022	Al-Shorta	64	(8)
2022	Al-Batin	0	(0)
2022–2024	Abha	32	(1)
2024	Al-Quwa Al-Jawiya		
2024–2025	Al-Talaba		
2025–2026	Duhok		
2026–	Al-Minaa	7	(0)

International career^{‡}
2011–2013	Iraq U20	3	(0)
2014–2016	Iraq U23	8	(0)
2024	Iraq Olympic (O.P.)	1	(0)
2015–	Iraq	44	(1)
- * Club domestic league appearances and goals as of 24 August 2022 ‡ National team caps and goals as of 10 December 2025

Saad Natiq Naji (Arabic: سَعْد نَاطِق نَاجِي, born 19 March 1994), is an Iraqi footballer who plays for and captains Al-Minaa, as well as playing for the Iraq national team as a center back and defensive midfielder.

== Club career ==
Born in Najaf Saad went through the Al-Najaf FC youth system and made his senior debut with his home club under Hatif Shamran in 2009 and was part of the club's first team for two seasons. However it was in the Iraqi capital that Saad made his name, when he joined Doura-based oil refinery club Al-Masafi in the south of Baghdad where he played for three seasons – earning his selection to the Iraqi U-19s. It was under Hakim Shaker that Saad Natiq became one of the nation's recognised defenders, playing for the Iraqi Under 19s at the FIFA World U-20 Cup in Turkey. It was his spell at Al-Masafi under the command of trainers Hassan Ahmed and Nadhim Shaker that he developed as a player and was transformed into a strong tackling centre half after used in several positions at the club including at right back having first started out as a midfield anchor in his early days at Al-Najaf. In the summer of 2014, the defender was signed by his former Al-Masafi club coach Nadhim Shaker to play for Al-Quwa Al-Jawiya after his club were relegated to the first division.

=== Al Arabi ===
Saad Natiq signed for Al Arabi for the 2017/18 season. He made his debut on 17 September against Al Sailiya which ended in a 3–1 defeat. He scored his first goal in the Qatar Stars League against Al Rayyan on 19 November, with his second coming in the same match.

== International career ==
On 26 August 2015, Natiq made his first international appearance for Iraq against Lebanon in a friendly match.

=== International Goals ===
No	Date	Venue	Opponent	Score	Result	Competition
1.	29 January 2024	Khalifa International Stadium, Al Rayyan, Qatar	Jordan	1–1	2–3	2023 AFC Asian Cup

== Honours ==
Al-Quwa Al-Jawiya

- Iraqi Premier League: 2016–17
- Iraq FA Cup: 2015–16
- AFC Cup: 2016, 2018

Al-Shorta

- Iraqi Premier League: 2021–22
- Iraqi Super Cup: 2019

Iraq U-20

- FIFA U-20 World Cup 4th-place: 2013

Iraq U-23

- Asian Games bronze-medal: 2014
