= 2019 Iraqi Super Cup =

Football match

Al-Shorta	Al-Zawraa
1	1
- Al-Shorta won 4–3 on penalties
- Date: 14 September 2019
- Venue: Al-Kut Olympic Stadium, Kut
- Man of the Match: Karrar Jassim (Al-Shorta)
- Referee: Wathik Mohammed Al-Baag
- Attendance: 19,000

The 2019 Iraqi Super Cup was the 9th edition of the Iraqi Super Cup. The match was contested between the Baghdad rivals, Al-Shorta and Al-Zawraa, at Al-Kut Olympic Stadium in Kut. It was played on 14 September 2019 as a curtain-raiser to the 2019–20 season. Al-Shorta made their 2nd appearance in the Super Cup while Al-Zawraa extended their record to 7 appearances. Al-Shorta won the cup on penalties for the club's first Super Cup title.

== Match ==
=== Details ===
14 September 2019
18:00 UTC+03:00

Al-Shorta	1–1	Al-Zawraa
Mapuku 60'		Abbas 49'
Penalties
Mapuku (penalty scored); Ismail (penalty scored); Faez (penalty scored); S. Abdul-Amir (penalty missed); Salim (penalty scored)	4–3	(penalty scored) Mohsin; (penalty scored) Jalal; (penalty scored) A. Abdul-Amir; (penalty missed) M. Abdul-Zahra; (penalty missed) Ridha

Al-Kut Olympic Stadium, Kut
Attendance: 19,000
Referee: Wathik Mohammed Al-Baag

Al-Shorta	Al-Zawraa

GK	20	(Iraq) Mohammed Hameed (c)
RB	23	(Iraq) Waleed Salim
CB	4	(Iraq) Saad Natiq
CB	6	(Iraq) Ali Faez
LB	11	(Iraq) Dhurgham Ismail
RM	8	(Iraq) Karrar Jassim	(substituted off) 85'
CM	19	(Iraq) Amjad Attwan	(substituted off) 76'
CM	25	(Iraq) Saad Abdul-Amir
LM	3	(Mali) Aboubacar Diarra	(substituted off) 46'
CF	9	(Iraq) Marwan Hussein	(substituted off) 58'
CF	10	(Iraq) Alaa Abdul-Zahra
Substitutions:
MF	15	(Iraq) Nabeel Sabah	(substituted in) 46'
FW	21	(Democratic Republic of the Congo) Junior Mapuku	(substituted in) 58'
MF	5	(Iraq) Safaa Hadi	(substituted in) 76'
FW	7	(Iraq) Sherko Karim	(substituted in) 85'
Manager:
(Serbia) Aleksandar Ilić

GK	1	(Iraq) Fahad Talib
RB	2	(Iraq) Mustafa Mohammed
CB	29	(Iraq) Abbas Qasim (c)	(yellow card) 30'
CB	34	(Iraq) Abdullah Abdul-Amir
LB	77	(Gabon) Stévy Nzambé
RM	20	(Nigeria) Solomon Williams		(substituted off) 64'
CM	6	(Iraq) Mohammed Ridha
CM	14	(Iraq) Najm Shwan		(substituted off) 73'
LM	19	(Iraq) Mahdi Kamel		(substituted off) 90+2'
CF	99	(Iraq) Emad Mohsin
CF	9	(Iraq) Alaa Abbas		(substituted off) 76'
Substitutions:
MF	7	(Iraq) Ahmad Fadhel	(yellow card) 86'	(substituted in) 64'
DF	15	(Mauritania) Hassan Houbeib		(substituted in) 73'
MF	11	(Iraq) Ahmed Jalal		(substituted in) 76'
DF	4	(Iraq) Mohammed Abdul-Zahra		(substituted in) 90+2'
Manager:
(Iraq) Hakeem Shaker

Man of the Match:
Karrar Jassim (Al-Shorta)

Assistant referees:
Haider Abdul-Hassan
Moayad Mohammed Ali
Fourth official:
Mohammed Salman

Match rules

- 90 minutes.
- Penalty shoot-out if scores level.
- Nine named substitutes.
- Maximum of four substitutions.

Iraqi Super Cup
2019 winner
Al-Shorta
1st title
