= 2025–26 Al-Shorta SC season =

Al-Shorta
2025–26 season
- President: Abdul-Halim Fahem
- Head coach: Moamen Soliman (until 27 April); Ahmed Salah (on loan) (from 27 April onwards)
- Ground: Al-Shaab Stadium (until 20 November); Al-Shorta Stadium (from 4 January onwards)
- Iraq Stars League: 2nd
- Iraq FA Cup: Not completed
- AFC Champions League Elite: League stage
- Top goalscorer: League: Leonel Ateba (17); All: Leonel Ateba (17)
Home colours	Away colours

The 2025–26 season was Al-Shorta's 52nd season in the Iraq Stars League, having featured in all 51 previous editions of the competition. Al-Shorta participated in the Iraq Stars League, as defending champions, and the AFC Champions League Elite, the premier club tournament in Asia.

Al-Shorta were initially scheduled to begin their season with the Iraqi Super Cup, but the competition was cancelled. The Iraq FA Cup was also cancelled at the round of 16 stage. On 4 January, Al-Shorta opened the new Al-Shorta Stadium with a 1–0 win over Zakho in the Iraq Stars League.

Al-Shorta finished as the league runners-up behind rivals Al-Quwa Al-Jawiya, which was the first time they had not won the league title since the 2020–21 season after four successive title wins. In the AFC Champions League Elite, Al-Shorta missed out on a place in the knockout stage, despite picking up a 3–2 victory against Al-Duhail in their last match.

== Player statistics ==
Numbers in parentheses denote appearances as substitute.

No.	Pos.	Nat.	Name	Stars League		ACL Elite		Total	
No.	Pos.	Nat.	Name	Apps	Goals	Apps	Goals	Apps	Goals
1	GK	IRQ	Ahmed Basil (captain)	27	0	5	0	32	0
2	DF	IRQ	Adam Rasheed	6(1)	0	0	0	6(1)	0
4	DF	IRQ	Munaf Younis	24(3)	1	6	0	30(3)	1
5	MF	IRQ	Rewan Amin	14(3)	0	2(2)	0	16(5)	0
7	FW	SYR	Mahmoud Al-Mawas (vice-captain)	31(2)	10	5(1)	0	36(3)	10
8	MF	SEN	Dominique Mendy	31(3)	3	7(1)	1	38(4)	4
9	MF	IRQ	Hussein Ali	26(10)	2	8	0	34(10)	2
10	FW	CMR	Leonel Ateba	28(9)	17	6	0	34(9)	17
11	MF	IRQ	Bassam Shakir	15(13)	4	4(2)	2	19(15)	6
13	DF	ALG	Tarek Aggoun	8(3)	0	2	0	10(3)	0
14	MF	NIG	Abdoul Madjid Moumouni	28(3)	2	2(3)	0	30(6)	2
15	DF	IRQ	Ahmed Yahya	22(2)	2	6(1)	0	28(3)	2
16	GK	IRQ	Hassan Ahmed	10(1)	0	2	0	12(1)	0
17	FW	IRQ	Ahmed Farhan	10(19)	7	4(4)	0	14(23)	7
19	FW	IRQ	Salem Ahmed	1(11)	1	0(2)	0	1(13)	1
20	MF	TUN	Mootez Zaddem	16(5)	2	2	0	18(5)	2
21	MF	IRQ	Shareef Abdul-Kadhim	12(17)	5	1(4)	1	13(21)	6
22	GK	IRQ	Mohammed Karim	1(2)	0	1	0	2(2)	0
23	DF	IRQ	Mustafa Saadoon	25(2)	2	5(1)	0	30(3)	2
24	DF	IRQ	Abbas Fadhel	3(4)	0	0	0	3(4)	0
25	MF	IRQ	Abdul-Razzaq Qasim	27(7)	2	8	0	35(7)	2
27	DF	IRQ	Ameer Sabah	3(7)	0	2(1)	0	5(8)	0
28	MF	IRQ	Hussein Jabbar	10(6)	0	1(4)	0	11(10)	0
30	MF	SYR	Fahd Al-Youssef	13(7)	0	1(1)	0	14(8)	0
31	MF	IRQ	Atheer Salih	7(7)	2	0	0	7(7)	2
32	FW	SEN	Bouly Sambou	8(11)	3	1	2	9(11)	5
Players out on loan for rest of the season
26	MF	IRQ	Abdul-Khaliq Mohammed	0(3)	0	0	0	0(3)	0
32	FW	IRQ	Abdullah Bassim	0	0	0	0	0	0
	DF	IRQ	Ahmed Zero	0	0	0	0	0	0
Players departed but featured this season
3	DF	BRA	Moisés Lucas	2	0	1	0	3	0
6	DF	MAR	Mehdi Ashabi	4(1)	0	5	0	9(1)	0
12	DF	IRQ	Hassan Raed	2(1)	0	1(1)	0	3(2)	0
29	FW	IRQ	Mohammed Dawood	4(9)	0	0(4)	0	4(13)	0

== Personnel ==
=== Technical staff ===
Position	Name	Nationality
Head coach:	Ahmed Salah	(Egypt)
Assistant coach:	Ahmed Mnajed	(Iraq)
Fitness coach:	Amir Alaa	(Iraq)
Goalkeeping coach:	Akram Sabih	(Iraq)
Physiotherapist:	Tonello Marilia	(Brazil)
Team manager:	Hashim Ridha	(Iraq)

=== Management ===
Position	Name	Nationality
President:	Abdul-Halim Fahem	(Iraq)
Vice-president:	Ali Al-Shahmani	(Iraq)
Board secretary:	Alaa Bahar Al-Uloom	(Iraq)
Financial secretary	Tahseen Al-Yassri	(Iraq)
Member of the Board:	Uday Al-Rubaie	(Iraq)
Member of the Board:	Abdul-Wahab Al-Taei	(Iraq)
Member of the Board:	Ghalib Al-Zamili	(Iraq)
Member of the Board:	Ihsan Ali	(Iraq)
Member of the Board:	Mustafa Jabbar Alak	(Iraq)
Member of the Board:	Hussein Subhan	(Iraq)

== Kit ==
Supplier: Kelme

Home	Away

== Transfers ==
=== In ===
Date	Pos.	Name	From	Fee
July 2025	MF	(Senegal) Dominique Mendy	(Iraq) Al-Najaf	-
July 2025	DF	(Brazil) Moisés Lucas	(Iraq) Duhok	-
July 2025	MF	(Iraq) Hussein Jabbar	(Iraq) Al-Quwa Al-Jawiya	-
July 2025	MF	(Iraq) Shareef Abdul-Kadhim	(Iraq) Al-Talaba	-
July 2025	DF	(Iraq) Mustafa Saadoon	(Iraq) Al-Quwa Al-Jawiya	-
August 2025	MF	(Iraq) Abdul-Khaliq Mohammed	(Iraq) Al-Karkh	-
August 2025	DF	(Morocco) Mehdi Ashabi	(Morocco) OC Safi	-
August 2025	FW	(Iraq) Salem Ahmed	(Iraq) Al-Minaa	-
August 2025	FW	(Cameroon) Leonel Ateba	(Tanzania) Simba	-
January 2026	DF	(Iraq) Abbas Fadhel	(Iraq) Naft Maysan	-
January 2026	DF	(Algeria) Tarek Aggoun	(Romania) Metaloglobus București	-
January 2026	MF	(Syria) Fahd Al-Youssef	Free agent	-
January 2026	MF	(Tunisia) Mootez Zaddem	(Iraq) Erbil	-
February 2026	DF	(Iraq) Adam Rasheed	(Slovenia) NK Maribor	-
February 2026	FW	(Senegal) Bouly Sambou	(Iraq) Duhok	-

=== Out ===
Date	Pos.	Name	To	Fee
July 2025	DF	(Morocco) Ayoub Mouddane	(Morocco) FUS Rabat	End of loan
July 2025	FW	(Brazil) Lucas Santos	(Iraq) Al-Kahrabaa	-
August 2025	DF	(Iraq) Akam Hashim	(Iraq) Al-Zawraa	-
August 2025	MF	(Iraq) Sajjad Jassim	(Iraq) Al-Karma	-
August 2025	FW	(Iraq) Mohanad Ali	(United Arab Emirates) Dibba	-
August 2025	DF	(Iraq) Faisal Jassim	(Iraq) Al-Minaa	-
August 2025	MF	(Tunisia) Ayoub Ben Mcharek		Released
August 2025	DF	(Iraq) Ahmed Zero	(Iraq) Erbil	Loan
August 2025	MF	(Syria) Fahd Al-Youssef		Released
August 2025	DF	(Cameroon) Salomon Banga	(Iraq) Al-Gharraf	-
November 2025	DF	(Brazil) Moisés Lucas		Released
January 2026	DF	(Morocco) Mehdi Ashabi		Released
January 2026	MF	(Iraq) Abdul-Khaliq Mohammed	(Iraq) Al-Qasim	Loan
January 2026	FW	(Iraq) Abdullah Bassim	(Iraq) Al-Qasim	Loan
February 2026	FW	(Iraq) Mohammed Dawood	(Iraq) Duhok	-
February 2026	DF	(Iraq) Hassan Raed	(Iraq) Zakho	-

== Competitions ==
=== Iraq Stars League ===
21 September 2025 1	Al-Shorta	2 – 0	Duhok	Basra
15:00 GMT	Mahmoud Al-Mawas 9', 40'			Stadium: Al-Fayhaa Stadium

25 September 2025 2	Al-Shorta	3 – 2	Newroz	Basra
17:30 GMT	Mustafa Saadoon 34'; Dominique Mendy 39'; Mahmoud Al-Mawas 72' (pen.)		Ahmed Yahya 3' (o.g.); Aso Rostam 50'	Stadium: Al-Fayhaa Stadium

4 October 2025 3	Al-Kahrabaa	0 – 1	Al-Shorta	Baghdad
17:30 GMT			Ahmed Yahya 90+3'	Stadium: Al-Zawraa Stadium

24 October 2025 4	Erbil	1 – 0	Al-Shorta	Erbil
18:00 GMT	Sherzod Temirov 25'			Stadium: Franso Hariri Stadium

29 October 2025 5	Al-Shorta	1 – 0	Al-Karma	Baghdad
18:00 GMT	Bassam Shakir 20'			Stadium: Al-Shaab Stadium

20 November 2025 6	Al-Shorta	3 – 0	Al-Karkh	Baghdad
14:00 GMT	Leonel Ateba 28', 75', 85'			Stadium: Al-Shaab Stadium

26 December 2025 7	Al-Talaba	1 – 0	Al-Shorta	Baghdad
15:00 GMT	Habib Oueslati 62'			Stadium: Al-Madina Stadium

30 December 2025 8	Amanat Baghdad	2 – 1	Al-Shorta	Baghdad
15:30 GMT	Bakhtiyor Kosimov 8', 50'		Hussein Ali 35'	Stadium: Al-Saher Ahmed Radhi Stadium

4 January 2026 9	Al-Shorta	1 – 0	Zakho	Baghdad
15:30 GMT	Gaby Kiki 9' (o.g.)			Stadium: Al-Shorta Stadium

8 January 2026 10	Al-Qasim	1 – 7	Al-Shorta	Najaf
12:00 GMT	Mohammed Ali Attiya 4'		Mahmoud Al-Mawas 10'; Ahmed Farhan 45+1', 88'; Leonel Ateba 65', 69'; Dominique Mendy 72'; Shareef Abdul-Kadhim 90+2'	Stadium: Al-Najaf International Stadium

13 January 2026 11	Al-Shorta	3 – 0	Al-Mosul	Baghdad
12:00 GMT	Shareef Abdul-Kadhim 21'; Atheer Salih 54'; Bassam Shakir 86'			Stadium: Al-Shorta Stadium

17 January 2026 12	Al-Quwa Al-Jawiya	1 – 1	Al-Shorta	Diyala
14:30 GMT	Issam Al-Sabhi 81'		Mahmoud Al-Mawas 24'	Stadium: Diyala Stadium

23 January 2026 13	Al-Minaa	1 – 1	Al-Shorta	Basra
14:30 GMT	Mohammed Qasim Nassif 32'		Leonel Ateba 54'	Stadium: Al-Minaa Olympic Stadium

27 January 2026 14	Al-Shorta	2 – 1	Naft Maysan	Baghdad
14:30 GMT	Leonel Ateba 22'; Mahmoud Al-Mawas 35'		Ridha Mohammed Hachem 90+6'	Stadium: Al-Shorta Stadium

31 January 2026 15	Al-Shorta	2 – 1	Al-Najaf	Baghdad
14:30 GMT	Leonel Ateba 45+4', 90+15'		Sajjad Raad 71'	Stadium: Al-Shorta Stadium

4 February 2026 16	Al-Gharraf	0 – 1	Al-Shorta	Nasiriya
12:00 GMT			Leonel Ateba 48'	Stadium: Al-Nasiriya International Stadium

21 February 2026 17	Al-Shorta	3 – 0 (w/o)	Diyala	Baghdad
18:00 GMT	Shareef Abdul-Kadhim 40'; Salem Ahmed 90+6'		Aymen Mahmoud 51'	Stadium: Al-Shorta Stadium
Note: The match originally ended in a 2–1 win for Al-Shorta but was later awarded as a 3–0 win by walkover due to Diyala fielding seven foreign players on the field at the same time, which exceeded the maximum number of foreign players allowed to be on the field at one time (six players).

26 February 2026 18	Al-Zawraa	1 – 2	Al-Shorta	Baghdad
18:30 GMT	Mohammed Qasim Majid 21'		Leonel Ateba 11', 68'; Abdoul Madjid Moumouni (yellow card) 55' (yellow-red card) 78'	Stadium: Al-Zawraa Stadium

2 March 2026 19	Al-Shorta	2 – 0	Al-Kahrabaa	Baghdad
18:00 GMT	Ahmed Farhan 35'; Mahmoud Al-Mawas 81'			Stadium: Al-Shorta Stadium

7 March 2026 20	Duhok	2 – 1	Al-Shorta	Duhok
18:15 GMT	Peter Gwargis 11'; Josef Al-Imam 86'		Leonel Ateba 71'; Hussein Ali (red card) 90+8'	Stadium: Duhok Stadium

12 March 2026 21	Al-Mosul	0 – 1	Al-Shorta	Duhok
20:15 GMT			Mootez Zaddem 54'	Stadium: Duhok Stadium

17 March 2026 22	Al-Shorta	3 – 3	Al-Talaba	Baghdad
20:15 GMT	Masies Artien 17' (o.g.); Mootez Zaddem 45+5'; Hussein Ammar 67' (o.g.)		Ghaith Maaroufi 12'; Ali Yousif 84'; Zaid Ismail 90+2'	Stadium: Al-Shorta Stadium

21 March 2026 23	Al-Naft	1 – 1	Al-Shorta	Baghdad
16:30 GMT	Hussein Abdullah 69' (pen.)		Mahmoud Al-Mawas 30'	Stadium: Sharar Haidar Stadium

26 March 2026 24	Zakho	0 – 2	Al-Shorta	Zakho
12:30 GMT	Aso Rostam (penalty missed) 55'		Orinho 30' (o.g.); Atheer Salih 90+5'	Stadium: Zakho International Stadium

31 March 2026 25	Al-Shorta	3 – 3	Al-Quwa Al-Jawiya	Baghdad
12:00 GMT	Mahmoud Al-Mawas 10'; Abdoul Madjid Moumouni 35'; Ahmed Farhan 73'; Hassan Ahmed (red card) 77'		Wakaa Ramadan 72'; Issam Al-Sabhi 83' (pen.); Haythem Jouini 90+12' (pen.)	Stadium: Al-Shaab Stadium

4 April 2026 26	Al-Najaf	1 – 3	Al-Shorta	Najaf
16:30 GMT	Ridha Fadhil 84'		Bassam Shakir 18'; Ahmed Farhan 25'; Bouly Sambou 53'	Stadium: Al-Najaf International Stadium

8 April 2026 27	Al-Shorta	4 – 1	Amanat Baghdad	Baghdad
12:00 GMT	Mahmoud Al-Mawas 2'; Leonel Ateba 20'; Ahmed Farhan 51'; Bassam Shakir 90+5'		Montader Abdel-Amir 57' (pen.)	Stadium: Al-Shaab Stadium

13 April 2026 28	Al-Shorta	1 – 2	Al-Zawraa	Baghdad
14:00 GMT	Leonel Ateba 69' (pen.)		Hiran Ahmed 22', 28'	Stadium: Al-Shaab Stadium

17 April 2026 29	Al-Karma	1 – 1	Al-Shorta	Falluja
16:30 GMT	Aymen Hussein 39' (pen.)		Leonel Ateba 10' (pen.)	Stadium: Al-Jolan Stadium

22 April 2026 30	Al-Shorta	3 – 1	Al-Qasim	Baghdad
14:00 GMT	Munaf Younis 25'; Leonel Ateba 86'; Shareef Abdul-Kadhim 90+1'		Alaa Mhaisen 22' (pen.)	Stadium: Al-Shorta Stadium

26 April 2026 31	Naft Maysan	0 – 3 (w/o)	Al-Shorta	Maysan
14:00 GMT	Nassim Sioud 71'; Ridha Mohammed 90+6'		Abdul-Razzaq Qasim 30'; Dominique Mendy 81'; Rewan Amin (red card) 90+5'	Stadium: Maysan Olympic Stadium
Note: The match originally ended in a 2–2 draw but was later awarded as a 3–0 win to Al-Shorta by walkover due to Naft Maysan including the Yemeni player Ahmed Al-Sarori in their matchday squad, who had not played for his national team in each of the previous three years and was therefore ineligible per the squad registration rules.

1 May 2026 32	Al-Shorta	1 – 0	Al-Naft	Baghdad
14:00 GMT	Shareef Abdul-Kadhim 57'			Stadium: Al-Shorta Stadium

5 May 2026 33	Newroz	0 – 3	Al-Shorta	Sulaymaniya
14:30 GMT			Mustafa Saadoon 45+5'; Ahmed Yahya 56'; Bouly Sambou 90+1'	Stadium: Newroz Stadium

10 May 2026 34	Al-Shorta	1 – 0	Al-Gharraf	Baghdad
17:00 GMT	Abdul-Razzaq Qasim 6'			Stadium: Al-Shorta Stadium

15 May 2026 35	Diyala	0 – 2	Al-Shorta	Diyala
17:00 GMT			Ahmed Farhan 7'; Mahmoud Al-Mawas (penalty missed) 39'; Hussein Ali 56'	Stadium: Diyala Stadium

20 May 2026 36	Al-Shorta	0 – 2	Erbil	Baghdad
17:00 GMT	Leonel Ateba (penalty missed) 38'		Marlen Chobanov 15'; Cristian Barco 67'	Stadium: Al-Shorta Stadium

28 May 2026 37	Al-Karkh	0 – 2	Al-Shorta	Baghdad
15:00 GMT			Abdoul Madjid Moumouni 35'; Bouly Sambou 87'	Stadium: Sharar Haidar Stadium

2 June 2026 38	Al-Shorta	0 – 0	Al-Minaa	Baghdad
15:00 GMT			Mohammed Ghalib (red card) 43'	Stadium: Al-Shorta Stadium

=== AFC Champions League Elite ===
==== League stage ====
Pos	Team	Pld	W	D	L	GF	GA	GD	Pts	Qualification
8	(Qatar) Al Sadd	8	2	2	4	12	16	−4	8	Round of 16
9	(United Arab Emirates) Sharjah	8	2	2	4	8	16	−8	8	
10	(Qatar) Al-Gharafa	8	2	0	6	7	21	−14	6	
11	(Iraq) Al-Shorta	8	1	2	5	6	20	−14	5	
12	(Uzbekistan) Nasaf	8	1	1	6	9	17	−8	4	

Source: AFC

15 September 2025 1	Al-Shorta (Iraq)	1 – 1	(Qatar) Al-Sadd	Baghdad, Iraq
18:15 GMT	Dominique Mendy 28'		Hassan Al-Haydos 62'	Stadium: Al-Zawraa Stadium; Referee: Qasim Matar Al-Hatmi

29 September 2025 2	Al-Gharafa (Qatar)	2 – 0	(Iraq) Al-Shorta	Al-Rayyan, Qatar
16:00 GMT	Joselu 48'; Ferjani Sassi 54'			Stadium: Khalifa International Stadium; Referee: Sadullo Gulmurodi

20 October 2025 3	Al-Shorta (Iraq)	1 – 4	(Saudi Arabia) Al-Ittihad	Baghdad, Iraq
16:00 GMT	Bassam Shakir 5'		Moussa Diaby 17'; Fabinho 29'; Danilo Pereira (yellow card) 11' (yellow-red card) 50'; Houssem Aouar 60', 76'	Stadium: Al-Madina Stadium; Referee: Omar Al Ali

3 November 2025 4	Tractor (Iran)	1 – 0	(Iraq) Al-Shorta	Tabriz, Iran
16:00 GMT	Mehdi Torabi 26'			Stadium: Sahand Stadium; Referee: Abdulhadi Al-Ruaile

25 November 2025 5	Al-Hilal (Saudi Arabia)	4 – 0	(Iraq) Al-Shorta	Riyadh, Saudi Arabia
18:15 GMT	Marcos Leonardo 45', 72'; Milinković-Savić 63'; João Cancelo 90+3'		Ahmed Yahya (yellow card) 53' (yellow-red card) 61'	Stadium: Kingdom Arena; Referee: Qasim Matar Al-Hatmi

22 December 2025 6	Al-Shorta (Iraq)	0 – 5	(Saudi Arabia) Al-Ahli	Baghdad, Iraq
18:15 GMT			Roger Ibañez 30'; Ivan Toney 56'; Galeno 72'; Saleh Abu Al-Shamat 81'; Ziyad Al-Johani 86'	Stadium: Al-Zawraa Stadium; Referee: Adel Al-Naqbi

9 February 2026 7	FC Nasaf (Uzbekistan)	1 – 1	(Iraq) Al-Shorta	Ferghana, Uzbekistan
13:45 GMT	Murodbek Rahmatov 8'		Shareef Abdul-Kadhim 68'	Stadium: Istiqlol Stadium; Referee: Alireza Faghani

16 February 2026 8	Al-Shorta (Iraq)	3 – 2	(Qatar) Al-Duhail	Baghdad, Iraq
18:15 GMT	Bassam Shakir 19'; Bouly Sambou 57', 58'		Krzysztof Piątek 10'; Benjamin Bourigeaud 45+2' (pen.)	Stadium: Al-Zawraa Stadium; Referee: Nazmi Nasaruddin

== Top goalscorers ==
=== Iraq Stars League ===
Position	Nation	Squad Number	Name	Goals	Assists
FW	(Cameroon)	10	Leonel Ateba	17	9
FW	(Syria)	7	Mahmoud Al-Mawas	10	11
FW	(Iraq)	17	Ahmed Farhan	7	2
MF	(Iraq)	21	Shareef Abdul-Kadhim	5	2
MF	(Iraq)	11	Bassam Shakir	4	2
MF	(Senegal)	8	Dominique Mendy	3	4
FW	(Senegal)	32	Bouly Sambou	3	0
DF	(Iraq)	15	Ahmed Yahya	2	3
MF	(Niger)	14	Abdoul Madjid Moumouni	2	2
DF	(Iraq)	23	Mustafa Saadoon	2	2
MF	(Iraq)	9	Hussein Ali	2	1
MF	(Tunisia)	20	Mootez Zaddem	2	1
MF	(Iraq)	31	Atheer Salih	2	1
MF	(Iraq)	25	Abdul-Razzaq Qasim	2	0
FW	(Iraq)	19	Salem Ahmed	1	1
DF	(Iraq)	4	Munaf Younis	1	0
MF	(Iraq)	28	Hussein Jabbar	0	4
FW	(Iraq)	29	Mohammed Dawood	0	2
GK	(Iraq)	1	Ahmed Basil	0	1
DF	(Iraq)	27	Ameer Sabah	0	1
MF	(Syria)	30	Fahd Al-Youssef	0	1

=== AFC Champions League Elite ===
Position	Nation	Squad Number	Name	Goals	Assists
MF	(Iraq)	11	Bassam Shakir	2	1
FW	(Senegal)	32	Bouly Sambou	2	0
MF	(Senegal)	8	Dominique Mendy	1	0
MF	(Iraq)	21	Shareef Abdul-Kadhim	1	0
MF	(Iraq)	9	Hussein Ali	0	2
DF	(Morocco)	6	Mehdi Ashabi	0	1
MF	(Iraq)	25	Abdul-Razzaq Qasim	0	1
