= 2026–27 Al-Shorta SC season =

Al-Shorta
2026–27 season
- President: Abdul-Halim Fahem
- Head coach: Sami Trabelsi (until 14 October); Hussein Abdul-Wahed (from 15 October onwards)
- Ground: Al-Shorta Stadium
- Iraq Stars League: 4th
- Iraq FA Cup: Round of 32
- Iraqi Super Cup: Semi-finals
- AFC Champions League Two: Group stage
- Top goalscorer: League: Ahmed Yahya (4); All: Ahmed Yahya (5)
Home colours	Away colours

The 2026–27 season is Al-Shorta's 53rd season in the Iraq Stars League, having featured in all 52 previous editions of the competition. Al-Shorta are participating in the Iraq Stars League, the Iraq FA Cup and the Iraqi Super Cup. They are also competing in the AFC Champions League Two, the secondary club tournament in Asia, having finished as league runners-up in the previous season.

== Player statistics ==
Numbers in parentheses denote appearances as substitute.

No.	Pos.	Nat.	Name	Stars League		FA Cup		Super Cup		ACL Two		Total	
No.	Pos.	Nat.	Name	Apps	Goals	Apps	Goals	Apps	Goals	Apps	Goals	Apps	Goals
1	GK	IRQ	Mohammed Karim	0	0	0	0	0	0	0	0	0	0
2	DF	IRQ	Adam Rasheed	4	0	0	0	0	0	2	0	6	0
3	DF	IRQ	Mujtaba Saleh	0(5)	0	0	0	0	0	0(3)	0	0(8)	0
4	DF	VEN	Rubén Ramírez	13	0	0	0	0	0	3	0	16	0
5	DF	IRQ	Maitham Jabbar	13(1)	0	0	0	0	0	4	0	17(1)	0
6	DF	IRQ	Abbas Fadhel	2(1)	0	0	0	0	0	0	0	2(1)	0
8	MF	IRQ	Ayad Abd Farhan	0(2)	0	0	0	0	0	0	0	0(2)	0
9	MF	IRQ	Hussein Ali	14	1	0	0	0	0	4	2	18	3
10	FW	CMR	Leonel Ateba	8(4)	1	0	0	0	0	3(1)	0	11(5)	1
11	MF	IRQ	Bassam Shakir	9(1)	0	0	0	0	0	3	0	12(1)	0
12	GK	IRQ	Jalal Hassan (captain)	13	0	0	0	0	0	4	0	17	0
13	MF	COD	Boaz Ngalamulume	4(3)	0	0	0	0	0	3(1)	0	7(4)	0
14	MF	NIG	Abdoul Madjid Moumouni	9(3)	0	0	0	0	0	3	0	12(3)	0
15	DF	IRQ	Ahmed Yahya	13	4	0	0	0	0	4	1	17	5
16	GK	IRQ	Hassan Ahmed	1	0	0	0	0	0	0	0	1	0
17	FW	IRQ	Ahmed Farhan	0	0	0	0	0	0	0	0	0	0
18	FW	IRQ	Mohanad Ali (vice-captain)	4(4)	3	0	0	0	0	1(1)	1	5(5)	4
19	MF	IRQ	Ali Mohsin	5	0	0	0	0	0	2(1)	0	7(1)	0
20	MF	IRQ	Murtadha Hassan	0(3)	0	0	0	0	0	0(1)	0	0(4)	0
23	FW	NGA	Kingsley Fidelis Kuku	11(3)	1	0	0	0	0	4	3	15(3)	4
25	MF	IRQ	Atheer Salih	1(6)	0	0	0	0	0	1(1)	0	2(7)	0
26	MF	IRQ	Abdul-Khaliq Mohammed	1	0	0	0	0	0	0	0	1	0
29	FW	IRQ	Abdullah Bassim	4(10)	3	0	0	0	0	0(3)	0	4(13)	3
31	DF	IRQ	Ahmed Zero	9	0	0	0	0	0	2	0	11	0
32	DF	COL	Diego Hernández	3(3)	0	0	0	0	0	0(2)	0	3(5)	0
33	MF	ARG	Cristian Barco	13(1)	3	0	0	0	0	1(3)	1	14(4)	4
34	GK	IRQ	Abbas Tariq	0	0	0	0	0	0	0	0	0	0
Players out on loan for rest of the season
	MF	IRQ	Abdul-Razzaq Qasim	0	0	0	0	0	0	0	0	0	0

== Personnel ==
=== Technical staff ===
Position	Name	Nationality
Head coach:	Hussein Abdul-Wahed	(Iraq)
Assistant coach:	Osama Ali	(Iraq)
Fitness coach:	Mazin Abdul-Sattar	(Iraq)
Goalkeeping coach:	Ibrahim Salem	(Iraq)
Team manager:	Hashim Ridha	(Iraq)

=== Management ===
Position	Name	Nationality
President:	Abdul-Halim Fahem	(Iraq)
Vice-president:	Ali Al-Shahmani	(Iraq)
Board secretary:	Alaa Bahar Al-Uloom	(Iraq)
Financial secretary	Tahseen Al-Yassri	(Iraq)
Member of the Board:	Uday Al-Rubaie	(Iraq)
Member of the Board:	Abdul-Wahab Al-Taei	(Iraq)
Member of the Board:	Ghalib Al-Zamili	(Iraq)
Member of the Board:	Ihsan Ali	(Iraq)
Member of the Board:	Mustafa Jabbar Alak	(Iraq)
Member of the Board:	Hussein Subhan	(Iraq)

== Kit ==
Supplier: Kelme

Home	Away

== Transfers ==
=== In ===
Date	Pos.	Name	From	Fee
June 2026	DF	(Iraq) Ahmed Zero	(Iraq) Erbil	End of loan
June 2026	FW	(Nigeria) Kingsley Fidelis Kuku	(Iraq) Al-Gharraf	-
June 2026	MF	(Argentina) Cristian Barco	(Iraq) Erbil	-
June 2026	DF	(Iraq) Mujtaba Saleh	(Iraq) Al-Karkh	-
June 2026	DF	(Iraq) Maitham Jabbar	(Iraq) Al-Zawraa	-
June 2026	DF	(Colombia) Diego Hernández	(Colombia) Águilas Doradas	-
July 2026	DF	(Venezuela) Rubén Ramírez	(Venezuela) Universidad Central	-
July 2026	MF	(Iraq) Ayad Abd Farhan	(Iraq) Diyala	-
July 2026	GK	(Iraq) Jalal Hassan	(Iraq) Al-Zawraa	-
July 2026	MF	(Iraq) Ali Mohsin	(Iraq) Al-Karma	-
July 2026	MF	(Iraq) Murtadha Hassan	(Iraq) Al-Jolan	-
August 2026	FW	(Iraq) Mohanad Ali	(United Arab Emirates) Dibba	-
August 2026	MF	(Iraq) Atheer Salih	(Iraq) Zakho	-
September 2026	MF	(Democratic Republic of the Congo) Boaz Ngalamulume	(Libya) Abu Salim	-

=== Out ===
Date	Pos.	Name	To	Fee
June 2026	MF	(Iraq) Rewan Amin	(Iraq) Duhok	-
June 2026	MF	(Senegal) Dominique Mendy	(United Arab Emirates) Al-Dhafra	-
June 2026	DF	(Algeria) Tarek Aggoun	(Thailand) Ratchaburi	-
June 2026	MF	(Iraq) Shareef Abdul-Kadhim	(Iraq) Al-Gharraf	-
June 2026	MF	(Iraq) Atheer Salih	(Iraq) Zakho	-
June 2026	DF	(Iraq) Ameer Sabah	(Iraq) Al-Zawraa	-
June 2026	FW	(Syria) Mahmoud Al-Mawas	(Iraq) Duhok	-
June 2026	GK	(Iraq) Ahmed Basil	(Iraq) Al-Zawraa	-
July 2026	MF	(Syria) Fahd Al-Youssef	(Iraq) Al-Minaa	-
July 2026	MF	(Iraq) Hussein Jabbar	(Iraq) Al-Talaba	-
July 2026	MF	(Tunisia) Mootez Zaddem	(Tunisia) Club Africain	-
July 2026	MF	(Iraq) Abdul-Razzaq Qasim	(Iraq) Al-Minaa	Loan
July 2026	DF	(Iraq) Munaf Younis	(Iraq) Duhok	-
July 2026	DF	(Iraq) Mustafa Saadoon	(Iraq) Zakho	-
July 2026	FW	(Iraq) Salem Ahmed	(Iraq) Diyala	-
August 2026	FW	(Senegal) Bouly Sambou	(Jordan) Al-Wehdat	-

== Competitions ==
=== Iraq Stars League ===
16 August 2026 1	Al-Shorta	1 – 1	Karbala	Baghdad
18:00 GMT	Cristian Barco 28' (pen.)		Ali Ahmed (red card) 61'; Austin Amutu 90+3'	Stadium: Al-Shorta Stadium

21 August 2026 2	Al-Karma	2 – 1	Al-Shorta	Falluja
18:00 GMT	Paul Bassène 32'; Amoori Faisal 51'		Kingsley Fidelis Kuku 4'	Stadium: Al-Jolan Stadium

25 August 2026 3	Al-Jolan	0 – 1	Al-Shorta	Falluja
15:45 GMT			Leonel Ateba 40'	Stadium: Al-Jolan Stadium

30 August 2026 4	Al-Shorta	2 – 0	Al-Mosul	Baghdad
18:00 GMT	Ahmed Yahya 49'; Cristian Barco 68'			Stadium: Al-Shorta Stadium

4 September 2026 5	Al-Shorta	0 – 0	Erbil	Baghdad
18:00 GMT				Stadium: Al-Shorta Stadium

8 September 2026 6	Al-Gharraf	1 – 2	Al-Shorta	Nasiriya
18:00 GMT	Ahmed Hadhri 72'		Cristian Barco 65' (pen.); Abdullah Bassim 74'	Stadium: Al-Nasiriya International Stadium

12 September 2026 7	Al-Shorta	0 – 0	Ghaz Al-Shamal	Baghdad
18:00 GMT				Stadium: Al-Shorta Stadium

19 September 2026 8	Al-Shorta	2 – 0	Al-Kahrabaa	Baghdad
18:30 GMT	Ahmed Yahya 43'; Abdullah Bassim 90+1'			Stadium: Al-Shorta Stadium

8 October 2026 9	Al-Talaba	0 – 0	Al-Shorta	Baghdad
17:30 GMT				Stadium: Al-Madina Stadium

18 October 2026 10	Al-Shorta	1 – 1	Al-Karkh	Baghdad
17:30 GMT	Abdoul Madjid Moumouni (red card) 55'; Hussein Ali 62'		Naude Zeguei 57'	Stadium: Al-Shorta Stadium

23 October 2026 11	Al-Zawraa	0 – 2	Al-Shorta	Baghdad
14:00 GMT			Mohanad Ali 40'; Ahmed Yahya 59'	Stadium: Al-Madina Stadium

31 October 2026 12	Al-Shorta	1 – 1	Newroz	Baghdad
16:30 GMT	Mohanad Ali 32'		Mahmoud Al-Baeth 11'	Stadium: Al-Shorta Stadium

8 November 2026 13	Al-Shorta	2 – 1	Al-Naft	Baghdad
11:00 GMT	Abdullah Bassim 6'; Mohanad Ali 49'		Samson Dare Gbadebo 47'	Stadium: Al-Shaab Stadium

20 November 2026 14	Zakho	1 – 1	Al-Shorta	Zakho
13:00 GMT	Orinho 69'		Ahmed Yahya 40'	Stadium: Zakho International Stadium

=== AFC Champions League Two ===
==== League stage ====
Pos	Team	Pld	W	D	L	GF	GA	GD	Pts	Qualification
1	(Iraq) Al-Shorta (A)	4	3	1	0	8	3	+5	10	Round of 16
2	(Jordan) Al-Hussein	4	1	2	1	6	6	0	5	Round of 16
3	(Oman) Al-Seeb	4	1	1	2	2	4	−2	4	
4	(India) East Bengal	4	0	2	2	4	7	−3	2	

Updated to match(es) played on 3 November 2026. Source: ACL2
(A) Advance to a further round

16 September 2026 1	Al-Shorta (Iraq)	1 – 0	(Oman) Al-Seeb	Baghdad, Iraq
18:15 GMT	Hussein Ali 51'			Stadium: Al-Zawraa Stadium; Referee: Zayniddin Alimov

13 October 2026 2	East Bengal (India)	2 – 3	(Iraq) Al-Shorta	Kolkata, India
13:45 GMT	David Lalhlansanga 8', 40'		Ahmed Yahya 14'; Hussein Ali 51'; Kingsley Fidelis Kuku 53'; Abdoul Madjid Moumouni (yellow card) 39' (yellow-red card) 76'	Stadium: Salt Lake Stadium; Referee: Majed Al-Shamrani

27 October 2026 3	Al-Shorta (Iraq)	1 – 1	(Jordan) Al-Hussein	Baghdad, Iraq
18:15 GMT	Cristian Barco 90+5' (pen.)		Abdallah Nasib 29'	Stadium: Al-Zawraa Stadium; Referee: Asker Nadjafaliev

3 November 2026 4	Al-Hussein (Jordan)	0 – 3	(Iraq) Al-Shorta	Amman, Jordan
16:00 GMT			Kingsley Fidelis Kuku 14', 59'; Mohanad Ali 90+3'	Stadium: Amman International Stadium; Referee: Yahya Al-Mulla
