= 2024–25 Al-Shorta SC season =

Al-Shorta
2024–25 season
- President: Abdul-Halim Fahem
- Head coach: Ahmed Salah (until 8 December); Hussein Abdul-Wahed (Caretaker) (from 8 December until 3 January); Mohamed Azima (from 7 January until 10 March); Munir Jaber (Caretaker) (from 10 March until 17 March); Moamen Soliman (from 17 March onwards)
- Ground: Al-Shaab Stadium
- Iraq Stars League: 1st
- Iraq FA Cup: Semi-finals
- AFC Champions League Elite: League stage
- Top goalscorer: League: Mohanad Ali (27); All: Mohanad Ali (28)
Home colours	Away colours	Asian home colours

The 2024–25 season was Al-Shorta's 51st season in the Iraq Stars League, having featured in all 50 previous editions of the competition. Al-Shorta participated in the Iraq Stars League and the Iraq FA Cup as defending champions of both competitions. Al-Shorta also competed in the AFC Champions League Elite, the premier club tournament in Asia.

Al-Shorta started the season relatively slowly, only winning half of their first 18 league games under the management of Ahmed Salah and later Mohamed Azima. However, they returned to top form under returning head coach Moamen Soliman, winning 17 of their last 20 league matches and securing the title with two games to spare by beating Naft Al-Basra 3–1. This made them the first team in history to win four Iraq Stars League titles in a row. Striker Mohanad Ali scored 27 league goals, making him the competition's top scorer.

Al-Shorta were unable to defend their Iraq FA Cup title, losing to Zakho on penalties in the semi-finals. In the AFC Champions League Elite, Al-Shorta missed out on a place in the knockout stage, despite picking up a 2–0 victory against title holders Al-Ain in their last match.

== Player statistics ==
Numbers in parentheses denote appearances as substitute.

No.	Pos.	Nat.	Name	Stars League		FA Cup		ACL Elite		Total	
No.	Pos.	Nat.	Name	Apps	Goals	Apps	Goals	Apps	Goals	Apps	Goals
1	GK	IRQ	Ahmed Basil (vice-captain)	34	0	3	0	7	0	44	0
4	DF	IRQ	Munaf Younis	15(7)	0	1	0	6(1)	0	22(8)	0
5	MF	IRQ	Rewan Amin	15(7)	2	2(1)	0	1(2)	1	18(10)	3
6	MF	IRQ	Sajjad Jassim	26(6)	5	1(2)	1	3(2)	1	30(10)	7
7	FW	SYR	Mahmoud Al-Mawas	31(4)	12	2(1)	0	5(3)	1	38(8)	13
8	DF	IRQ	Akam Hashim	30(3)	0	2	0	3	0	35(3)	0
9	MF	IRQ	Hussein Ali	34(4)	2	3	0	7(1)	0	44(5)	2
10	FW	IRQ	Ahmed Farhan	7(21)	0	1(2)	0	2(1)	0	10(24)	0
11	MF	IRQ	Bassam Shakir	26(10)	2	2(1)	0	2(4)	0	30(15)	2
12	DF	IRQ	Hassan Raed	7(4)	0	0(2)	0	1	0	8(6)	0
14	MF	NIG	Abdoul Madjid Moumouni	20(3)	1	2	1	6	0	28(3)	2
15	DF	IRQ	Ahmed Yahya	29(1)	3	3	0	8	0	40(1)	3
17	MF	TUN	Ayoub Ben Mcharek	5(6)	3	1(1)	0	0	0	6(7)	3
18	FW	IRQ	Mohanad Ali (captain)	31(3)	27	3	0	6(2)	1	40(5)	28
21	GK	IRQ	Hassan Ahmed	4	0	0	0	0	0	4	0
22	GK	IRQ	Mohammed Karim	0	0	0	0	1	0	1	0
23	DF	MAR	Ayoub Mouddane (on loan)	16(1)	2	3	0	2	0	21(1)	2
24	DF	IRQ	Faisal Jassim	11(3)	0	0	0	3(2)	0	14(5)	0
25	MF	IRQ	Abdul-Razzaq Qasim	11(10)	1	0	0	4(2)	0	15(12)	1
27	DF	IRQ	Ameer Sabah	27(2)	0	1	0	5(3)	0	33(5)	0
28	FW	BRA	Lucas Santos	4(23)	5	0(1)	0	0(4)	1	4(28)	6
29	FW	IRQ	Mohammed Dawood	9(19)	5	0(2)	0	5(2)	1	14(23)	6
30	MF	SYR	Fahd Al-Youssef	13(11)	0	1(2)	0	7(1)	1	21(14)	1
31	DF	IRQ	Ahmed Zero	5(3)	0	2	0	0(1)	0	7(4)	0
36	DF	CMR	Salomon Banga	5(4)	0	0(1)	0	4(1)	0	9(6)	0
Players out on loan for rest of the season
	GK	IRQ	Abbas Karim	0	0	0	0	0	0	0	0
	MF	IRQ	Ammar Ghalib	0	0	0	0	0	0	0	0
	MF	IRQ	Atheer Salih	0	0	0	0	0	0	0	0
	FW	IRQ	Dhulfiqar Younis	0	0	0	0	0	0	0	0
Players departed but featured this season
19	MF	JOR	Mohammad Abu Zrayq	2(4)	1	0	0	0(1)	0	2(5)	1
20	MF	SEN	Idrissa Niang	0(6)	0	0	0	0(1)	0	0(7)	0

== Personnel ==
=== Technical staff ===
Position	Name	Nationality
Head coach:	Moamen Soliman	(Egypt)
Assistant coach:	Amrou Fathi	(Egypt)
Fitness coach:	Haidar Abdul-Qadir	(Iraq)
Goalkeeping coach:	Essam Saber	(Egypt)
Technical analyst:	Moataz Abdul-Haseeb	(Egypt)
Physiotherapist:	Tonello Marilia	(Brazil)
Team manager:	Hashim Ridha	(Iraq)

=== Management ===
Position	Name	Nationality
President:	Abdul-Halim Fahem	(Iraq)
Vice-president:	Ghalib Al-Zamili	(Iraq)
Board secretary:	Uday Al-Rubaie	(Iraq)
Financial secretary	Ghazi Faisal	(Iraq)
Member of the Board:	Sadeq Faraj	(Iraq)
Member of the Board:	Abdul-Wahab Al-Taei	(Iraq)
Member of the Board:	Ali Al-Shahmani	(Iraq)
Member of the Board:	Alaa Bahar Al-Uloom	(Iraq)
Member of the Board:	Tahseen Al-Yassri	(Iraq)

== Kit ==
Supplier: Qitharah (club's own brand)

Home	Home (Asia)	Away	Away (Asia)

== Transfers ==
=== In ===
Date	Pos.	Name	From	Fee
July 2024	DF	(Iraq) Hassan Raed	(Iraq) Al-Quwa Al-Jawiya	-
July 2024	DF	(Iraq) Akam Hashim	(Iraq) Erbil	-
July 2024	MF	(Jordan) Mohammad Abu Zrayq	(Jordan) Al-Wehdat	-
August 2024	MF	(Iraq) Rewan Amin	(Iraq) Duhok	-
August 2024	DF	(Algeria) Djamel Benlamri	(Algeria) MC Alger	-
September 2024	GK	(Iraq) Hassan Ahmed	(Iraq) Al-Talaba	-
January 2025	DF	(Morocco) Ayoub Mouddane	(Morocco) FUS Rabat	Loan
February 2025	MF	(Tunisia) Ayoub Ben Mcharek	(Tunisia) US Ben Guerdane	-

=== Out ===
Date	Pos.	Name	To	Fee
July 2024	DF	(Iraq) Karrar Amer	(Kuwait) Al-Nasr	-
August 2024	GK	(Iraq) Yassin Karim	(Iraq) Al-Talaba	-
August 2024	MF	(Iraq) Ali Husni	(Iraq) Al-Karma	-
August 2024	MF	(Iraq) Mohammed Mezher	(Iraq) Al-Karma	-
August 2024	MF	(Guinea) Ousmane Coumbassa		Released
August 2024	MF	(Iraq) Zidane Abdul-Jabbar	(Iraq) Al-Najaf	-
August 2024	FW	(Iraq) Alaa Abdul-Zahra	(Iraq) Al-Minaa	-
August 2024	MF	(Iraq) Atheer Salih	(Iraq) Al-Hudood	Loan
September 2024	GK	(Iraq) Abbas Karim	(Iraq) Al-Minaa	Loan
September 2024	FW	(Iraq) Aso Rostam	(Iraq) Newroz	-
September 2024	DF	(Algeria) Djamel Benlamri		Released
January 2025	MF	(Jordan) Mohammad Abu Zrayq	(Jordan) Al-Hussein	-
January 2025	MF	(Senegal) Idrissa Niang	(Iraq) Al-Talaba	-

== Competitions ==
=== Iraq Stars League ===
21 September 2024 1	Al-Shorta	2 – 2	Al-Karma	Baghdad
18:15 GMT	Hussein Ali 30'; Lucas Santos 46'		Mohammed Adnan 33'; Abbas Qasim 88'	Stadium: Al-Shaab Stadium

26 September 2024 2	Diyala	0 – 6	Al-Shorta	Baghdad
14:30 GMT			Mohanad Ali 14', 35', 45+1'; Mahmoud Al-Mawas 76', 90+1'; Mohammed Dawood 90+4'	Stadium: Al-Madina Stadium

5 October 2024 3	Al-Shorta	1 – 0	Al-Talaba	Baghdad
17:00 GMT	Mohammed Dawood 90+2'			Stadium: Al-Shaab Stadium

24 October 2024 4	Al-Hudood	0 – 1	Al-Shorta	Baghdad
14:45 GMT			Mohammad Abu Zrayq 52'; Ahmed Farhan (penalty missed) 90+7'	Stadium: Al-Saher Ahmed Radhi Stadium

28 October 2024 5	Al-Shorta	2 – 2	Al-Qasim	Baghdad
16:45 GMT	Mohanad Ali 48'; Lucas Santos 74'		Al-Harith Hatem 37', 90+4'	Stadium: Al-Shaab Stadium

31 October 2024 6	Al-Naft	0 – 2	Al-Shorta	Baghdad
11:45 GMT			Mohanad Ali 23'; Mohammed Dawood 45+3'	Stadium: Al-Saher Ahmed Radhi Stadium

7 December 2024 7	Al-Shorta	0 – 1	Zakho	Baghdad
14:15 GMT			Gustavo Henrique 58'	Stadium: Al-Shaab Stadium

11 December 2024 8	Al-Karkh	1 – 2	Al-Shorta	Baghdad
14:00 GMT	Christ Kouvouama 38'		Lucas Santos 66'; Sajjad Jassim 90+4' (pen.)	Stadium: Al-Saher Ahmed Radhi Stadium

16 December 2024 9	Al-Shorta	0 – 0	Duhok	Baghdad
14:00 GMT				Stadium: Al-Shaab Stadium

21 December 2024 10	Al-Kahrabaa	0 – 1	Al-Shorta	Baghdad
15:00 GMT			Ahmed Yahya 29'	Stadium: Al-Saher Ahmed Radhi Stadium

29 December 2024 11	Al-Shorta	1 – 1	Al-Minaa	Baghdad
14:00 GMT	Mahmoud Al-Mawas 76'		Mujtaba Ali 90+3'	Stadium: Al-Shaab Stadium

4 January 2025 12	Al-Shorta	4 – 1	Erbil	Baghdad
13:00 GMT	Mohanad Ali 16', 47', 51'; Lucas Santos 80'		Youssef Ben Souda 66'; Omar Jengi (yellow card) (yellow-red card) 75'	Stadium: Al-Shaab Stadium

10 January 2025 13	Al-Najaf	0 – 0	Al-Shorta	Najaf
14:00 GMT				Stadium: Al-Najaf International Stadium

14 January 2025 14	Al-Shorta	3 – 3	Naft Maysan	Baghdad
14:00 GMT	Sajjad Jassim 44'; Munaf Younis (yellow card) (yellow-red card) 52'; Mohanad Ali 66', (penalty missed) 77'; Mahmoud Al-Mawas 83'; Salomon Banga (yellow card) (yellow-red card) 90+7'		Sajjad Jabbar 20'; Daouda Diémé 57' (pen.); Alaa Saad 90+9' (pen.); Mohammed Salam (red card) 90+14'	Stadium: Al-Shaab Stadium

18 January 2025 15	Karbala	0 – 1	Al-Shorta	Karbala
14:00 GMT			Mohanad Ali 6'	Stadium: Karbala International Stadium

24 January 2025 16	Al-Shorta	2 – 2	Newroz	Baghdad
16:30 GMT	Mohanad Ali 78'; Wael Ben Othmane 88' (o.g.); Munaf Younis (red card) 90+9'		Marwan Hussein 35'; Gatoch Panom 90+10'	Stadium: Al-Shaab Stadium

30 January 2025 17	Al-Quwa Al-Jawiya	1 – 2	Al-Shorta	Baghdad
16:30 GMT	Alaa Abbas 81' (pen.)		Mohanad Ali 66', 85'	Stadium: Al-Shaab Stadium

8 February 2025 18	Al-Zawraa	0 – 0	Al-Shorta	Baghdad
16:30 GMT				Stadium: Al-Zawraa Stadium

13 February 2025 19	Al-Shorta	2 – 0	Al-Kahrabaa	Baghdad
14:00 GMT	Mohanad Ali 47'; Mahmoud Al-Mawas 70'			Stadium: Al-Shaab Stadium

4 March 2025 20	Al-Talaba	0 – 2	Al-Shorta	Baghdad
19:30 GMT	Karrar Amer (yellow card) (yellow-red card) 84'		Mohanad Ali 45+3'; Mahmoud Al-Mawas 90+1' (pen.)	Stadium: Al-Madina Stadium

9 March 2025 21	Al-Shorta	4 – 0	Karbala	Baghdad
20:30 GMT	Mohanad Ali 15'; Ayoub Mouddane 44', (red card) 86'; Rewan Amin 75', 79'			Stadium: Al-Shaab Stadium

13 March 2025 22	Naft Maysan	0 – 4	Al-Shorta	Maysan
18:15 GMT			Mohanad Ali 32' (pen.), 53', 58'; Mahmoud Al-Mawas 74'	Stadium: Maysan Olympic Stadium

30 March 2025 23	Al-Shorta	4 – 0	Al-Quwa Al-Jawiya	Baghdad
20:30 GMT	Ayoub Ben Mcharek 11'; Ruslan Hanoon 28' (o.g.); Hamoud Mishaan 65' (o.g.); Mohanad Ali 68'			Stadium: Al-Shaab Stadium

4 April 2025 24	Zakho	2 – 0	Al-Shorta	Zakho
18:00 GMT	Echeta Ugonna Deputy 20'; Amjad Attwan 90+8'			Stadium: Zakho International Stadium

8 April 2025 25	Al-Shorta	3 – 1	Naft Al-Basra	Baghdad
16:00 GMT	Mahmoud Al-Mawas 7'; Hussein Ali 19'; Abdul-Razzaq Qasim 90+2'		Hassan Dakhel 81' (pen.)	Stadium: Al-Shaab Stadium

12 April 2025 26	Al-Shorta	1 – 0	Al-Najaf	Baghdad
16:30 GMT	Sajjad Jassim 2'			Stadium: Al-Shaab Stadium

17 April 2025 27	Al-Minaa	0 – 1	Al-Shorta	Basra
16:30 GMT			Ayoub Mouddane (yellow card) (yellow-red card) 45+1'; Haider Salem 80' (o.g.)	Stadium: Al-Minaa Olympic Stadium

22 April 2025 28	Al-Shorta	0 – 1	Al-Zawraa	Baghdad
16:30 GMT			Murad Mohammed 74'	Stadium: Al-Shaab Stadium

28 April 2025 29	Erbil	0 – 2	Al-Shorta	Erbil
16:30 GMT			Mohanad Ali 3', 66' (pen.)	Stadium: Franso Hariri Stadium

3 May 2025 30	Newroz	0 – 1	Al-Shorta	Sulaymaniya
17:30 GMT			Sajjad Jassim 11' (pen.)	Stadium: Newroz Stadium

8 May 2025 31	Al-Shorta	1 – 0	Al-Karkh	Baghdad
17:30 GMT	Mohanad Ali 10'			Stadium: Al-Shaab Stadium

13 May 2025 32	Al-Karma	0 – 4	Al-Shorta	Ramadi
17:30 GMT			Bassam Shakir 38'; Mohanad Ali 62', 77'; Ahmed Yahya 90+4'	Stadium: Al-Ramadi Stadium

18 May 2025 33	Al-Shorta	1 – 0	Diyala	Baghdad
17:30 GMT	Mohanad Ali 90+3'		Hussein Younis (red card) 56'; Nathaniel Nangolo (red card) 90+10'	Stadium: Al-Shaab Stadium

24 May 2025 34	Duhok	1 – 3	Al-Shorta	Duhok
17:00 GMT	Peter Gwargis 90+5' (pen.)		Abdoul Madjid Moumouni 11'; Mahmoud Al-Mawas 27'; Ayoub Mouddane 42'	Stadium: Duhok Stadium

15 June 2025 35	Al-Shorta	4 – 0	Al-Naft	Baghdad
15:00 GMT	Sajjad Jassim 45+2' (pen.); Mahmoud Al-Mawas 70'; Ayoub Ben Mcharek 79', 86'			Stadium: Al-Shaab Stadium

20 June 2025 36	Naft Al-Basra	1 – 3	Al-Shorta	Basra
17:00 GMT	Hassan Dakhel 47'		Ahmed Yahya 35'; Mohanad Ali 58'; Mahmoud Al-Mawas 80'	Stadium: Al-Fayhaa Stadium

25 June 2025 37	Al-Shorta	3 – 1	Al-Hudood	Baghdad
18:00 GMT	Bassam Shakir 35'; Mohammed Dawood 45+5'; Lucas Santos 82'		Saif Kareem 48'	Stadium: Al-Shaab Stadium

2 July 2025 38	Al-Qasim	2 – 2	Al-Shorta	Baghdad
16:00 GMT	Haider Abdul-Rahim 87'; Hussein Abdul-Wahid Khalaf 90+8'		Mahmoud Al-Mawas 15' (pen.); Mohammed Dawood 73'	Stadium: Al-Shaab Stadium

==== Score overview ====
Win Draw Loss

Opposition	Home score	Away score	Double
Al-Hudood	3–1	1–0	Yes
Al-Kahrabaa	2–0	1–0	Yes
Al-Karkh	1–0	2–1	Yes
Al-Karma	2–2	4–0	No
Al-Minaa	1–1	1–0	No
Al-Naft	4–0	2–0	Yes
Al-Najaf	1–0	0–0	No
Al-Qasim	2–2	2–2	No
Al-Quwa Al-Jawiya	4–0	2–1	Yes
Al-Talaba	1–0	2–0	Yes
Al-Zawraa	0–1	0–0	No
Diyala	1–0	6–0	Yes
Duhok	0–0	3–1	No
Erbil	4–1	2–0	Yes
Karbala	4–0	1–0	Yes
Naft Al-Basra	3–1	3–1	Yes
Naft Maysan	3–3	4–0	No
Newroz	2–2	1–0	No
Zakho	0–1	0–2	No

Note: Al-Shorta goals listed first.

==== Classification ====
Pos	Team	Pld	W	D	L	GF	GA	GD	Pts	Qualification or relegation
1	Al-Shorta (C)	38	26	9	3	75	23	+52	87	Qualification for the AFC Champions League Elite league stage
2	Al-Zawraa	38	23	8	7	56	28	+28	77	Qualification for the AFC Champions League Two group stage (Note: Duhok, the 2024–25 Iraq FA Cup winners, were not granted an AFC license. Therefore, their AFC Champions League Two spot was passed to the league runners-up Al-Zawraa, and the AGCFF Gulf Club Champions League spot was passed to the league's third-placed team Zakho.)
3	Zakho	38	20	11	7	57	25	+32	71	Qualification for the AGCFF Gulf Club Champions League group stage
4	Al-Talaba	38	18	9	11	40	27	+13	63	
5	Al-Quwa Al-Jawiya	38	17	9	12	51	43	+8	60	

Source: IPFL
Rules for classification: 1) points; 2) head-to-head points; 3) head-to-head goal difference; 4) goal difference; 5) number of goals scored; 6) number of wins.
(C) Champions

==== Results summary ====
Overall								Home						Away					
Pld	W	D	L	GF	GA	GD	Pts	W	D	L	GF	GA	GD	W	D	L	GF	GA	GD
38	26	9	3	75	23	+52	87	11	6	2	38	15	+23	15	3	1	37	8	+29

Source: Kooora

==== Results by round ====
Round	1	2	3	4	5	6	7	8	9	10	11	12	13	14	15	16	17	18	19	20	21	22	23	24	25	26	27	28	29	30	31	32	33	34	35	36	37	38
Ground	H	A	H	A	H	A	H	A	H	A	H	H	A	H	A	H	A	A	H	A	H	A	H	A	H	H	A	H	A	A	H	A	H	A	H	A	H	A
Result	D	W	W	W	D	W	L	W	D	W	D	W	D	D	W	D	W	D	W	W	W	W	W	L	W	W	W	L	W	W	W	W	W	W	W	W	W	D
Position	6	4	1	1	1	1	8	7	7	2	2	2	2	3	2	2	2	3	2	3	3	3	2	3	1	1	1	2	2	2	2	2	2	1	1	1	1	1

Source: Kooora
A = Away; H = Home; W = Win; D = Draw; L = Loss

=== Iraq FA Cup ===
27 February 2025 Round of 16	Al-Shorta	1 – 0 (a.e.t.)	Al-Mosul	Baghdad
17:00 GMT	Sajjad Jassim 119' (pen.)			Stadium: Al-Shaab Stadium

8 July 2025 Quarter-finals	Al-Shorta	1 – 1 (a.e.t.) (4 – 1 p)	Al-Talaba	Baghdad
19:30 GMT	Abdoul Madjid Moumouni 50'; Ahmed Zero (yellow card) 7' (yellow-red card) 60'		Austin Amutu 76'	Stadium: Al-Shaab Stadium
	Penalties
	Sajjad Jassim (penalty scored); Ayoub Ben Mcharek (penalty scored); Ahmed Farhan (penalty scored); Mohammed Dawood (penalty scored)		(penalty scored) Louaï El Ani; (penalty missed) Shareef Abdul-Kadhim; (penalty missed) Simon Msuva

12 July 2025 Semi-finals	Zakho	0 – 0 (a.e.t.) (4 – 3 p)	Al-Shorta	Zakho
20:00 GMT				Stadium: Zakho International Stadium
	Penalties
	Amjad Attwan (penalty scored); Nasser Mohammedoh (penalty scored); Echeta Ugonna Deputy (penalty missed); Mohammad Abu Hashish (penalty scored); Gustavo Henrique (penalty scored)		(penalty missed) Sajjad Jassim; (penalty missed) Lucas Santos; (penalty scored) Mohammed Dawood; (penalty scored) Fahd Al-Youssef; (penalty scored) Ahmed Farhan

=== AFC Champions League Elite ===
==== League stage ====
Pos	Team	Pld	W	D	L	GF	GA	GD	Pts	Qualification
1	(Saudi Arabia) Al-Hilal	8	7	1	0	26	7	+19	22	Round of 16
2	(Saudi Arabia) Al-Ahli	8	7	1	0	21	8	+13	22	Round of 16
3	(Saudi Arabia) Al-Nassr	8	5	2	1	17	6	+11	17	Round of 16
4	(Qatar) Al-Sadd	8	3	3	2	10	9	+1	12	Round of 16
5	(United Arab Emirates) Al Wasl	8	3	2	3	8	12	−4	11	Round of 16
6	(Iran) Esteghlal	8	2	3	3	8	9	−1	9	Round of 16
7	(Qatar) Al-Rayyan	8	2	2	4	8	12	−4	8	Round of 16
8	(Uzbekistan) Pakhtakor	8	1	4	3	4	6	−2	7	Round of 16
9	(Iran) Persepolis	8	1	4	3	6	10	−4	7	
10	(Qatar) Al-Gharafa	8	2	1	5	10	18	−8	7	
11	(Iraq) Al-Shorta	8	1	3	4	7	17	−10	6	
12	(United Arab Emirates) Al Ain	8	0	2	6	11	22	−11	2	

Source: Asian Football Confederation

16 September 2024 1	Al-Shorta (Iraq)	1 – 1	(Saudi Arabia) Al-Nassr	Baghdad, Iraq
16:00 GMT	Mohammed Dawood 24'		Sultan Al-Ghannam 14'	Stadium: Al-Madina Stadium; Referee: Ahmed Al-Ali

1 October 2024 2	Al-Hilal (Saudi Arabia)	5 – 0	(Iraq) Al-Shorta	Riyadh, Saudi Arabia
18:00 GMT	Marcos Leonardo 11'; Aleksandar Mitrović 15'; Salem Al-Dawsari 47'; Nasser Al-Dawsari 73'; Mohamed Kanno 90+5'			Stadium: Prince Faisal bin Fahd Sports City; Referee: Qasim Al Hatmi

21 October 2024 3	Al-Shorta (Iraq)	0 – 0	(Uzbekistan) Pakhtakor	Karbala, Iraq
16:00 GMT				Stadium: Karbala International Stadium; Referee: Ma Ling

4 November 2024 4	Al-Ahli (Saudi Arabia)	5 – 1	(Iraq) Al-Shorta	Jeddah, Saudi Arabia
16:00 GMT	Franck Kessié (penalty missed) 25'; Roberto Firmino 14', 45+5'; Firas Al-Buraikan 53'; Riyad Mahrez 61', 65'		Sajjad Jassim 29'	Stadium: King Abdullah Sports City Stadium; Referee: Sadullo Gulmurodi

26 November 2024 5	Al-Shorta (Iraq)	1 – 3	(United Arab Emirates) Al-Wasl	Karbala, Iraq
16:00 GMT	Fahd Al-Youssef 50'		Jonatas Santos 14'; Fábio Lima 64' (pen.); Nicolás Giménez 90+2' (pen.)	Stadium: Karbala International Stadium; Referee: Yusuke Araki

2 December 2024 6	Persepolis (Iran)	2 – 1	(Iraq) Al-Shorta	Doha, Qatar
14:00 GMT	Oston Urunov 89'; Giorgi Gvelesiani 90+13' (pen.)		Mohanad Ali 19'; Mahmoud Al-Mawas (penalty missed) 90+9'	Stadium: Hamad bin Khalifa Stadium; Referee: Kim Dae-yong

3 February 2025 7	Esteghlal (Iran)	1 – 1	(Iraq) Al-Shorta	Tehran, Iran
16:00 GMT	Joel Kojo 4'		Rewan Amin 49'	Stadium: Azadi Stadium; Referee: Adel Al Naqbi

17 February 2025 8	Al-Shorta (Iraq)	2 – 0	(United Arab Emirates) Al-Ain	Baghdad, Iraq
16:00 GMT	Mahmoud Al-Mawas 50'; Lucas Santos 90+4'			Stadium: Al-Zawraa Stadium; Referee: Abdulrahman Al-Jassim

== Top goalscorers ==
=== Iraq Stars League ===
Position	Nation	Squad Number	Name	Goals	Assists
FW	(Iraq)	18	Mohanad Ali	27	1
FW	(Syria)	7	Mahmoud Al-Mawas	12	15
MF	(Iraq)	6	Sajjad Jassim	5	2
FW	(Iraq)	29	Mohammed Dawood	5	2
FW	(Brazil)	28	Lucas Santos	5	0
DF	(Iraq)	15	Ahmed Yahya	3	3
MF	(Tunisia)	17	Ayoub Ben Mcharek	3	2
MF	(Iraq)	9	Hussein Ali	2	9
MF	(Iraq)	11	Bassam Shakir	2	2
DF	(Morocco)	23	Ayoub Mouddane	2	2
MF	(Iraq)	5	Rewan Amin	2	0
MF	(Niger)	14	Abdoul Madjid Moumouni	1	1
MF	(Iraq)	25	Abdul-Razzaq Qasim	1	1
MF	(Jordan)	19	Mohammad Abu Zrayq	1	0
DF	(Iraq)	27	Ameer Sabah	0	5
FW	(Iraq)	10	Ahmed Farhan	0	4
MF	(Syria)	30	Fahd Al-Youssef	0	2
DF	(Cameroon)	36	Salomon Banga	0	1

=== Iraq FA Cup ===
Position	Nation	Squad Number	Name	Goals	Assists
MF	(Iraq)	6	Sajjad Jassim	1	0
MF	(Niger)	14	Abdoul Madjid Moumouni	1	0

=== AFC Champions League Elite ===
Position	Nation	Squad Number	Name	Goals	Assists
FW	(Syria)	7	Mahmoud Al-Mawas	1	2
FW	(Iraq)	29	Mohammed Dawood	1	1
MF	(Iraq)	5	Rewan Amin	1	0
MF	(Iraq)	6	Sajjad Jassim	1	0
FW	(Iraq)	18	Mohanad Ali	1	0
FW	(Brazil)	28	Lucas Santos	1	0
MF	(Syria)	30	Fahd Al-Youssef	1	0
MF	(Iraq)	9	Hussein Ali	0	1
FW	(Iraq)	10	Ahmed Farhan	0	1
DF	(Morocco)	23	Ayoub Mouddane	0	1
