= 2026–27 Al-Zawraa SC season =

Al-Zawraa
2026–27 season
- President: Haidar Shanshool
- Head coach: Basim Qasim
- Ground: Al-Zawraa Stadium
- Iraq Stars League: Ongoing
- Iraq FA Cup: TBD
- Iraqi Super Cup: TBD
- 2026–27 Gulf Club Champions League: TBD
- Top goalscorer: League: TBD; All: TBD

The 2026–27 season is Al-Zawraa's 52nd season in the Iraq Stars League. Al-Zawraa are participating in the Iraq Stars League and the Iraq FA Cup. They also entered the Iraqi Super Cup following their fourth-place finish in the 2025–26 Iraq Stars League. Al-Zawraa are additionally competing in the 2026–27 Gulf Club Champions League, having been selected as one of Iraq's two representatives.

== Pre-season ==
On 15 June 2026, Al-Zawraa appointed Basim Qasim as head coach for the 2026–27 season, replacing Luay Salah. Qasim was assisted by Rahim Hameed and Ahmed Basim Qasim, with Hashim Khamis as goalkeeping coach, Nasser Abdul-Amir as fitness coach and Renas Ismail as technical analyst.

The team's first training session under Qasim took place on 11 July 2026 at Al-Shaljiya Stadium.

== Competitions ==
=== Iraq Stars League ===
Al-Zawraa began their league campaign on 15 August 2026 with a 0–0 draw against Al-Minaa at home. The league consists of 20 clubs, with each club playing 38 matches on a home-and-away basis.

==== League table ====
Pos	Team	Pld	W	D	L	GF	GA	GD	Pts	Qualification or relegation
1	Al-Karma	8	6	2	0	14	5	+9	20	Qualification for the AFC Champions League Elite preliminary stage
2	Al-Zawraa	8	5	3	0	15	3	+12	18	Qualification for the Arab Club Champions Cup group stage (Note: If the winners of the Iraq FA Cup finish in the top two places in the league, the league runners-up will instead qualify for the AFC Champions League Two group stage, and the Arab Club Champions Cup spot will be passed down to the league's third-placed team.)
3	Erbil	8	5	2	1	12	3	+9	17	Qualification for the GFF Gulf Club Champions League group stage (Note: The league's third-placed team and the runners-up of the Iraq FA Cup both qualify for the GFF Gulf Club Champions League. Depending on which teams reach the final of the Iraq FA Cup, a GFF Gulf Club Champions League spot may be passed down to the league's fourth-placed team, or to both the fourth and fifth-placed teams.)
4	Al-Shorta	8	4	3	1	9	4	+5	15	
5	Al-Naft	8	4	3	1	9	5	+4	15	

Updated to match(es) played on 19 September 2026. Source: Iraq Stars League
Rules for classification: 1) points; 2) goal difference; 3) number of goals scored; 4) head-to-head points; 5) head-to-head goal difference; 6) head-to-head number of goals scored (if more than two teams are tied); 7) number of wins; 8) number of red cards; 9) number of yellow cards; 10) drawing of lots.

==== Matches ====
15 August 2026 1	Al-Zawraa	0–0	Al-Minaa	Baghdad
				Stadium: Al-Zawraa Stadium

21 August 2026 2	Karbala	1–1	Al-Zawraa	Karbala

25 August 2026 3	Al-Zawraa	4–0	Naft Maysan	Baghdad

29 August 2026 4	Al-Zawraa	4–0	Zakho	Baghdad

3 September 2026 5	Al-Mosul	2–2	Al-Zawraa	Mosul

7 September 2026 6	Al-Zawraa	1–0	Al-Kahraba	Baghdad

10 September 2026 7	Al-Quwa Al-Jawiya	0–1	Al-Zawraa	Karbala
				Stadium: Karbala International Stadium

17 September 2026 8	Al-Zawraa	2–0	Al-Gharraf	Baghdad
				Stadium: Al-Zawraa Stadium

9 October 2026 9	Duhok	v	Al-Zawraa	Duhok

18 October 2026 10	Ghaz Al-Shamal	v	Al-Zawraa

23 October 2026 11	Al-Zawraa	v	Al-Shorta	Baghdad

30 October 2026 12	Diyala	v	Al-Zawraa	Diyala

6 November 2026 13	Al-Zawraa	v	Al-Jolan	Baghdad

20 November 2026 14	Al-Zawraa	v	Al-Talaba	Baghdad

27 November 2026 15	Al-Karkh	v	Al-Zawraa	Baghdad

4 December 2026 16	Erbil	v	Al-Zawraa	Erbil

11 December 2026 17	Al-Zawraa	v	Newroz	Baghdad

25 December 2026 18	Al-Zawraa	v	Al-Karma	Baghdad

28 December 2026 19	Al-Naft	v	Al-Zawraa	Baghdad

1 January 2027 20	Al-Minaa	v	Al-Zawraa	Basra

5 February 2027 21	Al-Zawraa	v	Duhok	Baghdad

12 February 2027 22	Al-Zawraa	v	Karbala	Baghdad

19 February 2027 23	Naft Maysan	v	Al-Zawraa	Maysan

26 February 2027 24	Al-Shorta	v	Al-Zawraa	Baghdad

5 March 2027 25	Al-Zawraa	v	Ghaz Al-Shamal	Baghdad

12 March 2027 26	Al-Zawraa	v	Al-Quwa Al-Jawiya	Baghdad

19 March 2027 27	Al-Jolan	v	Al-Zawraa

2 April 2027 28	Al-Talaba	v	Al-Zawraa	Baghdad

5 April 2027 29	Al-Zawraa	v	Al-Mosul	Baghdad

9 April 2027 30	Al-Gharraf	v	Al-Zawraa	Dhi Qar

16 April 2027 31	Al-Zawraa	v	Erbil	Baghdad

19 April 2027 32	Newroz	v	Al-Zawraa	Sulaymaniyah

23 April 2027 33	Zakho	v	Al-Zawraa	Zakho

30 April 2027 34	Al-Zawraa	v	Diyala	Baghdad

7 May 2027 35	Al-Karkh	v	Al-Zawraa	Baghdad

17 May 2027 36	Al-Karma	v	Al-Zawraa

21 May 2027 37	Al-Kahraba	v	Al-Zawraa

28 May 2027 38	Al-Zawraa	v	Al-Naft	Baghdad

=== Iraqi Super Cup ===
Al-Zawraa qualified for the four-team Iraqi Super Cup after finishing fourth in the 2025–26 Iraq Stars League. They were drawn against league champions Al-Quwa Al-Jawiya in the semi-final, with the match scheduled for 14 December 2026. The other semi-final is Al-Shorta versus Erbil, with the final scheduled for 18 December 2026.

14 December 2026 Semi-final	Al-Quwa Al-Jawiya	v	Al-Zawraa

=== Iraq FA Cup ===
The 2026–27 Iraq FA Cup is scheduled to begin on 13 December 2026. The Round of 32 is scheduled for 29 January 2027, the round of 16 for 22 February, the quarter-finals for 8 March, the semi-finals for 3 May and the final for 14 May 2027.

=== Gulf Club Champions League ===
Al-Zawraa qualified for the third edition of the Gulf Club Champions League. The 12-team competition is divided into three groups of four, with Al-Zawraa drawn in Group B alongside Al-Nasr, Qatar SC and Al-Riffa. The group stage is played on a home-and-away basis from 13 October 2026 to 17 February 2027. The top two teams in each group, together with the two best third-placed teams, advance to the quarter-finals.

==== Group stage ====
October 2026 1	v

Detailed match dates and venues had not yet been published as of 20 September 2026.
