= 2026–27 Iraq Stars League =

52nd season of the Iraq Stars League

Iraq Stars League
- Season: 2026–27
- Dates: 14 August 2026 – 28 May 2027

The 2026–27 Iraq Stars League is the 53rd season of the highest tier football league in Iraq since its establishment in 1974, and the fourth season since launching as a professional league under the name Iraq Stars League. The season started on 14 August 2026 and will end on 28 May 2027

== Overview ==
20 teams are competing in the 2026–27 Iraq Stars League: 17 teams from the previous season, as well as Al-Jolan, Ghaz Al-Shamal and Karbala who were promoted from the 2025–26 Iraqi Premier Division League, replacing Amanat Baghdad, Al-Najaf and Al-Qasim who were relegated. Karbala are returning to the top flight after a one-year absence, while Al-Jolan and Ghaz Al-Shamal are playing in the top flight for the first time in history this season.

=== New rules ===
For the first time since the 2019–20 season, goal difference is being used as the first tiebreaker for teams level on points. This is followed by number of goals scored, head-to-head points, head-to-head goal difference, head-to-head number of goals scored (if more than two teams are tied), number of wins, number of red cards, number of yellow cards and finally a drawing of lots.

The bottom four teams in the Stars League will be relegated this season, while the top two teams from the Premier Division League will be promoted, in order to reduce the number of teams in the Stars League to 18 teams.

== Teams ==
Locations of teams in the 2026–27 Iraq Stars League

=== Clubs and locations ===
Team	Manager	Location	Stadium	Capacity
Al-Gharraf	(Tunisia) Yamen Zelfani	Dhi Qar (Al-Gharraf)	Al-Nasiriya International Stadium	20,000
Al-Jolan	(Iraq) Anmar Salam	Al-Anbar (Falluja)	Al-Jolan Stadium	6,000
Al-Kahrabaa	(Iraq) Hassan Ahmed	Baghdad (Al-Wazireya Al-Sinaaiya)	Al-Zawraa Stadium	15,443
Al-Karkh	(Syria) Ayman Hakeem	Baghdad (Mansour)	Sharar Haidar Stadium	5,150
Al-Karma	(Egypt) Moamen Soliman	Al-Anbar (Al-Karma)	Al-Jolan Stadium	6,000
Al-Minaa	(Montenegro) Miodrag Radulović	Basra (Al-Maqal)	Al-Minaa Olympic Stadium	30,000
Al-Mosul	(Jordan) Haitham Al-Shboul	Mosul	Franso Hariri Stadium	25,000
Al-Naft	(Iraq) Adel Nima	Baghdad (Shaab)	Sharar Haidar Stadium	5,150
Al-Quwa Al-Jawiya	(Oman) Rashid Jaber	Baghdad (Al-Rusafa)	Al-Madina Stadium	32,000
Al-Shorta	(Iraq) Hussein Abdul-Wahed	Baghdad (Al-Rusafa)	Al-Shorta Stadium	10,089
Al-Talaba	(Iran) Alireza Mansourian	Baghdad (Hayy Qahira)	Al-Madina Stadium	32,000
Al-Zawraa	(Iraq) Basim Qasim	Baghdad (Sheikh Maaruf, Al-Shaljiya)	Al-Zawraa Stadium	15,443
Diyala	(Tunisia) Kais Yaâkoubi	Diyala (Baquba)	Diyala Stadium	10,000
Duhok	(Iran) Yahya Golmohammadi	Duhok	Duhok Stadium	22,800
Erbil	(Iraq) Luay Salah	Erbil	Franso Hariri Stadium	25,000
Ghaz Al-Shamal	(Syria) Raafat Mohammad	Kirkuk	Newroz Stadium	14,500
Karbala	(Iraq) Qahtan Chathir	Karbala	Karbala International Stadium	30,000
Naft Maysan	(Iraq) Haider Obeid	Maysan (Amara)	Maysan Olympic Stadium	25,000
Newroz	(Iraq) Wali Kareem	Sulaymaniya	Newroz Stadium	14,500
Zakho	(France) Laurent Banide	Duhok (Zakho)	Zakho International Stadium	20,000

== League table ==
Pos	Team	Pld	W	D	L	GF	GA	GD	Pts	Qualification or relegation
1	Al-Karma	14	9	3	2	25	13	+12	30	Qualification for the AFC Champions League Elite preliminary stage
2	Newroz	14	8	5	1	21	7	+14	29	Qualification for the Arab Club Champions Cup group stage (Note: If the winners of the Iraq FA Cup finish in the top two places in the league, the league runners-up will instead qualify for the AFC Champions League Two group stage, and the Arab Club Champions Cup spot will be passed down to the league's third-placed team.)
3	Al-Naft	14	8	4	2	18	9	+9	28	Qualification for the GFF Gulf Club Champions League group stage (Note: The league's third-placed team and the runners-up of the Iraq FA Cup both qualify for the GFF Gulf Club Champions League. Depending on which teams reach the final of the Iraq FA Cup, a GFF Gulf Club Champions League spot may be passed down to the league's fourth-placed team, or to both the fourth and fifth-placed teams.)
4	Al-Shorta	14	6	7	1	16	8	+8	25	
5	Al-Zawraa	14	7	3	4	21	13	+8	24	
6	Al-Jolan	14	6	5	3	21	15	+6	23	
7	Erbil	14	5	6	3	17	10	+7	21	
8	Al-Minaa	14	5	5	4	15	15	0	20	
9	Duhok	14	4	7	3	21	17	+4	19	
10	Ghaz Al-Shamal	14	4	7	3	10	10	0	19	
11	Al-Quwa Al-Jawiya	14	3	7	4	17	16	+1	16	
12	Al-Talaba	14	3	7	4	16	22	−6	16	
13	Diyala	14	3	6	5	16	19	−3	15	
14	Al-Mosul	14	4	3	7	15	22	−7	15	
15	Zakho	14	3	5	6	11	17	−6	14	
16	Al-Gharraf	14	3	5	6	12	19	−7	14	
17	Al-Karkh	14	3	4	7	17	21	−4	13	Relegation to the Iraqi Premier Division League
18	Al-Kahrabaa	14	2	6	6	10	16	−6	12	Relegation to the Iraqi Premier Division League
19	Naft Maysan	14	1	6	7	9	21	−12	9	Relegation to the Iraqi Premier Division League
20	Karbala	14	1	4	9	13	28	−15	7	Relegation to the Iraqi Premier Division League

Updated to match(es) played on 21 November 2026. Source: Iraq Stars League
Rules for classification: 1) points; 2) goal difference; 3) number of goals scored; 4) head-to-head points; 5) head-to-head goal difference; 6) head-to-head number of goals scored (if more than two teams are tied); 7) number of wins; 8) number of red cards; 9) number of yellow cards; 10) drawing of lots.

== Results ==
Home \ Away	GHA	JOL	KAH	KKH	KRM	MIN	MSL	NFT	QWJ	SHR	TLB	ZWR	DYL	DHK	ERB	GSH	KRB	NFM	NEW	ZAK
Al-Gharraf		0–0						0–0	2–3	1–2						0–1			1–0	
Al-Jolan			2–1	1–0				2–3		0–1				2–0					0–2	1–1
Al-Kahrabaa	0–0				1–1	2–1					0–1						0–0			2–1
Al-Karkh	1–2		2–2				1–1							3–2	0–1			3–2		
Al-Karma				3–2			1–1	3–0		2–1				1–0			2–0	4–1		1–0
Al-Minaa	3–0				2–1			0–3	a					1–1		2–0	3–2	1–1		2–1
Al-Mosul		2–4						0–1	0–3			2–2	2–1	0–1			3–0			
Al-Naft				2–0									2–0	1–1			2–1			2–0
Al-Quwa Al-Jawiya				0–1	0–0	0–0				a	a	0–1	1–1			1–1		1–1		
Al-Shorta			2–0	1–1			2–0	2–1	a		a	a			0–0	0–0	1–1		1–1	
Al-Talaba		2–2		3–2				0–0	1–0	0–0		a				2–2			0–3 (Note: The Al-Talaba–Newroz match originally ended in a 1–0 win for Al-Talaba but was changed to a 3–0 win for Newroz due to Al-Talaba fielding two players on the field with the same shirt number, which violated league rules.)	
Al-Zawraa	2–0	0–3	1–0			0–0			a	0–2	4–1		2–0					4–0		4–0
Diyala	3–1	3–3	1–1		1–2	0–0					2–1							2–0		
Duhok	1–1								2–1		3–3	3–0			1–1	1–1	5–2			
Erbil	1–1		2–0		1–2	2–0	0–1		1–1				2–0			1–1				
Ghaz Al-Shamal		0–1	1–1	1–0								1–0						1–0	0–0	
Karbala	1–2			1–0					2–3		2–2	1–1			0–3					
Naft Maysan		0–0	1–0				1–2	0–0			2–0				1–1				0–2	0–0
Newroz					3–2	2–0	3–0		3–3				0–0	0–0			1–0			
Zakho							2–1			1–1	0–0		2–2		2–1	1–0			0–1	

Updated to match(es) played on 21 November 2026. Source: Iraq Stars League
Legend: Blue = home team win; Yellow = draw; Red = away team win.
For upcoming matches, an "a" indicates there is an article about the rivalry between the two participants.

== Season statistics ==
=== Top scorers ===
Rank	Player	Club	Goals
1	(Iraq) Younus Hammood	Duhok	7
1	(Iraq) Saif Rasheed Hameed	Al-Talaba	7
3	(Iraq) Hiran Ahmed	Al-Zawraa	6
3	(Iraq) Mohammad Jawad	Al-Quwa Al-Jawiya	6
5	(Brazil) Caíque	Al-Naft	5
5	(Brazil) Igor Henrique	Duhok	5
7	(Brazil) Neto Acará	Newroz	4
7	(Nigeria) Austin Amutu	Karbala	4
7	(Senegal) Paul Bassène	Al-Karma	4
7	(Senegal) Daouda Diémé	Naft Maysan	4
7	(Iraq) Amoori Faisal	Al-Karma	4
7	(Egypt) Marwan Hamdy	Al-Karma	4
7	(Iraq) Mohammed Khudair	Diyala	4
7	(Brazil) Miullen	Erbil	4
7	(Iraq) Mohammed Qasim Majid	Al-Zawraa	4
7	(Syria) Yassin Samia	Al-Minaa	4
7	(Tunisia) Nassim Sioud	Diyala	4
7	(Ivory Coast) Mamadou Soro	Al-Karkh	4

==== Hat-tricks ====
Player	For	Against	Result	Date	Reference
(Iraq) Saif Rasheed	Al-Talaba	Duhok	3–3 (A)	22 August 2026	
(Nigeria) Ifeanyi Eze	Erbil	Karbala	3–0 (A)	18 September 2026	

Notes

(H) – Home team
(A) – Away team
