= Maitham Jabbar =

Iraqi footballer

Personal information
- Full name: Maitham Jabbar Mutlag Al-Farttoosi
- Date of birth: 10 November 2000 (age 26)
- Place of birth: Kumayt, Iraq
- Height: 1.82 m (6 ft 0 in)
- Position: Defender

Team information
- Current team: Al-Shorta
- Number: 5

Senior career*
Years	Team	Apps	(Gls)
2018–2019	Al-Karkh		
2019–2022	Al-Quwa Al-Jawiya		
2022–2026	Al-Zawraa		
2026–	Al-Shorta	7	(0)

International career^{‡}
2017	Iraq U17	4	(0)
2017	Iraq U20	0	(0)
2019–	Iraq	20	(0)
- * Club domestic league appearances and goals as of 16 September 2026 ‡ National team caps and goals as of 30 May 2026

Maitham Jabbar Mutlag Al-Farttoosi (Arabic: مَيْثَم جَبَّار مُطْلَق الْفَرْطُوسِيّ; born 10 November 2000) is an Iraqi footballer who plays as a defender for Al-Shorta in the Iraq Stars League and the Iraq national team.

== International career ==
On 20 March 2019, Jabbar made his first international cap with Iraq against Syria in the 2019 International Friendship Championship.

== Honours ==
=== Club ===
Al-Quwa Al-Jawiya

- Iraqi Premier League: 2020–21
- Iraq FA Cup: 2020–21
