= Al Iraqiya Sports =

Iraqi sports television network

Al-Iraqiya Sports
- Type: Satellite television network
- Country: Iraq
- First air date: 12 June 2005; 21 years ago
- Availability: International
- Headquarters: Baghdad
- Owner: Iraqi Government
- Launch date: 12 June 2005; 21 years ago
- Former names: Iraqi TV
- Official website: imn.iq
- Language: Arabic

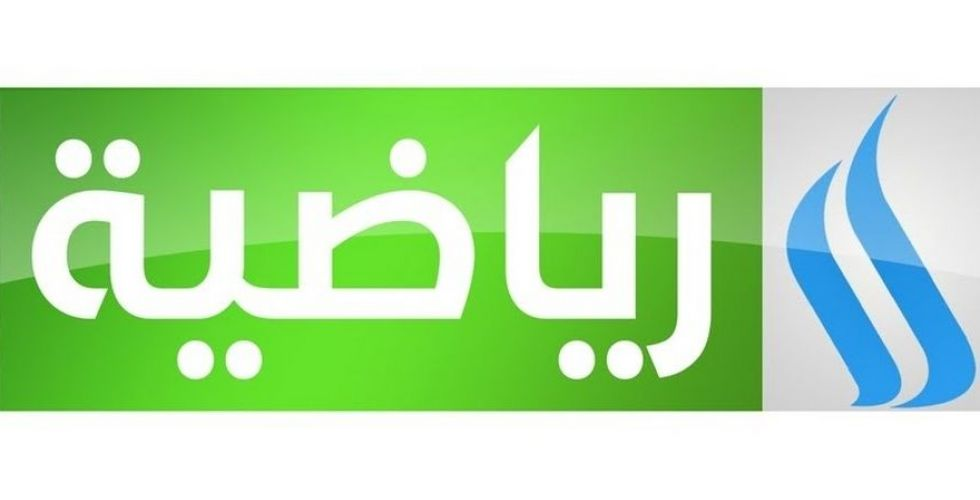
Official Logo

Al Iraqiya Sports (Arabic: قناة العراقية الرياضية) is an Iraqi television channel owned by the Iraqi Media Network. It started its broadcasts via a network of terrestrial transmitters in 2005 and later started satellite broadcasts. It broadcasts a wide variety of sports, especially football.

== History ==
The channel began broadcasting on 12 June 2005, terrestrially, in the cities of Baghdad, Karbala, Nasiriyah, and Basra. Eventually, the channel started broadcasting on the Nilesat satellite. Its flagship program is Captain, a daily analysis of local sporting events, presented by Hussein Al-Bahadli. Although the channel did not have the rights to the 2019 AFC Asian Cup held in the United Arab Emirates, it did have special pre- and post-match programs and was supportive of the national team. A high definition feed was officially announced on 31 March 2019.

The channel started using new studios on 28 July 2022, coinciding with its rebrand, which included a new logo. That same year, it acquired the rights to the Iraq Cup. It ramped up its exclusive rights to local and international events in 2024, giving prominence to Iraq in international competitions. In April 2025, it acquired the rights to the match between Duhok SC and Al Qadisiya SC for the Gulf Cup.
