= Abdul-Hussein Abtaan =

Iraqi politician

Abdul-Hussein Abdul Redha Abtaan

Minister of Youth and Sports
- In office 2014–2018
- Prime Minister: Haider al-Abadi

Personal details
- Born: 1 May 1964 (age 62) Najaf, Iraq
- Party: NWM (formerly); Iqtidar Watan (since 2021)
- Occupation: Politician

Abdul-Hussein Abdul Redha Abtaan (Arabic: عبد الحسين عبد الرضا عبطان; born 1 May 1964) is an Iraqi politician. He served as deputy governor of Najaf (2005–2009), a member of parliament (2010–2014), and minister of youth and sports (2014–2018). In 2021 he founded Iqtidar Watan, a centrist-reformist political party and member of the Shiite Coordination Framework.

== See also ==
- Haider al-Abadi
