= 2026 Iraqi Super Cup =

Iraqi football competition

Tournament details
- Host country: Iraq
- Dates: 14–18 December 2026
- Teams: 4

The 2026 Iraqi Super Cup will be the 12th edition of the Iraqi Super Cup, an annual football competition for clubs in the Iraqi football league system that were successful in its major competitions in the preceding season. It will be the first edition of the tournament under a new four-team format.

== Qualification ==
Due to the cancellation of the 2025–26 Iraq FA Cup, the tournament will feature the top four teams from the 2025–26 Iraq Stars League.

=== Qualified teams ===
The following four teams qualified for the tournament.

Team	Method of qualification	Appearance	Last appearance as	Previous performance	
Team	Method of qualification	Appearance	Last appearance as	Winner(s)	Runners-up
Al-Quwa Al-Jawiya	2025–26 Iraq Stars League champions	7th	2021 runners-up	2	4
Al-Shorta	2025–26 Iraq Stars League runners-up	4th	2022 winners	2	1
Erbil	2025–26 Iraq Stars League third place	1st	–	–	–
Al-Zawraa	2025–26 Iraq Stars League fourth place	9th	2021 winners	5	3

== Matches ==
- Times listed are AST (UTC+3).
- If scores are level after 90 minutes, the game goes to a penalty shoot-out.

=== Bracket ===
Semi-finals
14 December 2026
Al-Quwa Al-Jawiya
Al-Zawraa
15 December 2026
Al-Shorta
Erbil

Final
18 December 2026

=== Semi-finals ===
14 December 2026

Al-Quwa Al-Jawiya	v	Al-Zawraa

15 December 2026

Al-Shorta	v	Erbil

=== Final ===
18 December 2026
16:00

Winner Semi-final 1	v	Winner Semi-final 2

Al-Madina Stadium, Baghdad

== See also ==
- 2026–27 Iraq Stars League
- 2026–27 Iraq FA Cup
