= 2019 International Friendship Championship =

Middle East football tournament

Tournament details
- Host country: Iraq
- City: Basra
- Dates: 20–26 March
- Teams: 3 (from 1 confederation)
- Venue: 1 (in 1 host city)

Final positions
- Champions: Iraq (1st title)
- Runners-up: Syria

Tournament statistics
- Matches played: 3
- Goals scored: 7 (2.33 per match)
- Best player: (Iraq) Justin Meram

The 2019 International Friendship Championship was a football tournament for the national teams of Iraq, Syria and Jordan. It was scheduled to take place during the March 2019 window of the FIFA International Match Calendar.

== Results ==
Pos	Team	Pld	W	D	L	GF	GA	GD	Pts
1	Iraq	2	2	0	0	4	2	+2	6
2	Syria	2	1	0	1	1	1	0	3
3	Jordan	2	0	0	2	2	4	−2	0

Source: Unknown
Rules for classification: 1) Points; 2) Goal difference; 3) Number of goals scored.
20 March 2019

Iraq	1–0	Syria
Meram 75'	Report

Basra Sports City, Basra

23 March 2019

Jordan	0–1	Syria
	Report	Al-Khatib 86'

Basra Sports City, Basra

26 March 2019

Iraq	3–2	Jordan
Hussein 38'; Resan 52'; Ali 70'	Report	Sulaka 7' (o.g.); Faisal 87'

Basra Sports City, Basra
