= Akam Hashim =

Iraqi footballer (born 1998)

- Hashim with Al-Zawraa in 2026

Personal information
- Full name: Akam Hashim Rahman
- Date of birth: 16 August 1998 (age 28)
- Place of birth: Erbil, Iraq
- Height: 1.84 m (6 ft 0 in)
- Positions: Centre-back; midfielder

Team information
- Current team: Zakho
- Number: 5

Youth career
- –2017: Erbil

Senior career*
Years	Team	Apps	(Gls)
2017–2024	Erbil		
2024–2025	Al-Shorta	33	(0)
2025–2026	Al-Zawraa	22	(2)
2026–	Zakho	3	(0)

International career^{‡}
2024–	Iraq	17	(1)
- * Club domestic league appearances and goals as of 16 September 2026 ‡ National team caps and goals as of 27 July 2026

Akam Hashim Rahman (Arabic: اكام هاشم رحمن; Kurdish: ئاکام هاشم ڕەحمان; born 16 August 1998) is a Kurdish Iraqi professional footballer who plays as a centre-back or midfielder for Zakho and the Iraq national team.

== Club career ==
Born in Erbil, Hashim is a youth product of his local team Erbil SC. He was promoted to the first team in 2017.

== International career ==
In January 2024, Hashim was called up to the Iraq national team to participate in the 2023 AFC Asian Cup after Amjad Attwan withdrew due to an injury.

Hashim made his debut on 11 June 2024 in a World Cup qualifier against Vietnam at the Basra International Stadium. He substituted Mohanad Ali in the 72nd minute, Iraq won 3–1.

== Career statistics ==
No.	Date	Venue	Opponent	Score	Result	Competition
1.	20 March 2025	Basra International Stadium, Basra, Iraq	Kuwait	1–2	2–2	2026 FIFA World Cup qualification

== Honours ==
Al-Shorta

- Iraq Stars League: 2024–25
