= Hussein Jabbar =

Iraqi footballer (born 1998)

Personal information
- Full name: Hussein Jabbar Abbood Al Majidi
- Date of birth: 9 March 1998 (age 28)
- Place of birth: Iraq
- Height: 1.71 m (5 ft 7 in)
- Position: Left winger

Team information
- Current team: Al-Talaba

Senior career*
| Years | Team | Apps | (Gls) |
| 2018–2019 | Al-Karkh | | |
| 2019–2023 | Al-Quwa Al-Jawiya | | |
| 2023 | Ohod | 6 | (1) |
| 2023–2025 | Al-Quwa Al-Jawiya | | |
| 2025–2026 | Al-Shorta | 16 | (0) |
| 2026– | Al-Talaba | | |

International career^{‡}
| 2019–2020 | Iraq U23 | | |
| 2022– | Iraq | 1 | (0) |
- * Club domestic league appearances and goals as of 8 July 2026 ‡ National team caps and goals as of 30 January 2022

Hussein Jabbar Abbood Al Majidi (Arabic: حسين جبار; born 9 March 1998), is an Iraqi professional footballer who plays as a left winger for Al-Talaba and the Iraq national team.

== Club career ==
Jabbar played for Al-Karkh until 2019. Then he moved to Al-Quwa Al-Jawiya and played in the 2021 AFC Champions League.

On 13 August 2023, Jabbar joined Saudi First Division League side Ohod. On 30 September 2023, Jabbar returned to Iraq and rejoined Al-Quwa Al-Jawiya.

== International career ==
Jabbar was called up for Iraq U23 in the 2020 AFC U-23 Championship.

Jabbar made his debut with the Iraq national team for the first time in the friendly against Uganda.

== Honours ==
=== Club ===
Al-Quwa Al-Jawiya

- Iraqi Premier League: 2020–21
- Iraq FA Cup: 2020–21, 2022–23

=== International ===
Iraq

- Arabian Gulf Cup: 2023
