= Hassan Raed =

Iraqi footballer

Personal information
- Full name: Hassan Raed Hassan Matrook
- Date of birth: 23 September 2000 (age 26)
- Place of birth: Iraq
- Height: 1.83 m (6 ft 0 in)
- Position: Defender

Team information
- Current team: Zakho

Senior career*
Years	Team	Apps	(Gls)
2018–2019	Al-Karkh		
2019–2024	Al-Quwa Al-Jawiya		
2024–2026	Al-Shorta	14	(0)
2026–	Zakho		

International career^{‡}
2018	Iraq U20	3	(0)
2019–	Iraq U23	4	(0)
2020–	Iraq	4	(0)
- * Club domestic league appearances and goals as of 5 February 2026 ‡ National team caps and goals as of 30 November 2021

Hassan Raed Hassan Matrook (born 23 September 2000) is an Iraqi footballer who plays as a defender for Zakho in the Iraq Stars League.

== International career ==
On 12 November 2020, Raed made his first international cap with Iraq against Jordan in a friendly.

== Honours ==
Al-Quwa Al-Jawiya

- Iraqi Premier League: 2020–21
- Iraq FA Cup: 2020–21, 2022–23

Al-Shorta

- Iraq Stars League: 2024–25
