= Leonel Ateba =

Cameroonian footballer

Personal information
- Full name: Christian Leonel Ateba Mbida
- Date of birth: 6 February 1999 (age 27)
- Place of birth: Douala, Cameroon
- Height: 1.83 m (6 ft 0 in)
- Position: Forward

Team information
- Current team: Al-Shorta
- Number: 10

Senior career*
Years	Team	Apps	(Gls)
2017	Fc Yaoundé II Formation		
2018–2019	AS Etoa Méki		
2019–2020	AS Fortuna de Mfou		
2021–2022	Cotonsport Garoua		
2022–2023	PWD Bamenda		
2023	Dynamo Douala		
2024	USM Alger	12	(1)
2024–2025	Simba S.C.		
2025–	Al-Shorta	37	(17)

International career
2023–2024	Cameroon	1	(0)
- * Club domestic league appearances and goals as of 2 June 2026

Leonel Ateba (born 6 February 1999) is a Cameroonian professional footballer who plays as a forward for Al-Shorta in the Iraq Stars League and the Cameroon national team.

== Club career ==
=== USM Alger ===
On 31 January 2024, Dynamo Douala announced the transfer of Ateba to USM Alger for a period of two and a half years. The signing of the player cost 215,000 euros. On 16 February 2024, played Ateba the first match with his new club as a starter against USM Khenchela in the Ligue 1. On social networks information was released, reporting the threat of the Cameroonian club to file a complaint with FIFA against the USM Alger for not having received the transfer money. Legal advisor and expert in FIFA regulations gave explanations, the expert say that the payment must go through the FIFA Clearing House a new procedure established by the international body. Also stated that Leonel Ateba was under contract with his club and did not have to negotiate his transfer on his own. Moreover, he acknowledged his honor by negotiating his employment contract himself, without the need for an intermediary. The expert explained that USM Alger had obtained four mandates from the player's representatives, and for this reason the club preferred Negotiate directly with Dinamo Douala.

On 8 March 2024, Ateba scored a brace against MB Rouissat in the Algerian Cup where he played as a substitute in a match that ended 8–0.

== International career ==
On 21 November 2023, Ateba played his first match with the Cameroon national team against Libya in the 2026 FIFA World Cup qualifiers. On 28 December 2023, Rigobert Song announced the list of 27 players for the 2023 Africa Cup of Nations including Ateba.

== Career statistics ==
=== Club ===
As of match played 14 June 2024

Appearances and goals by club, season and competition
Club	Season	League			Algerian Cup		Continental		Total	
Club	Season	Division	Apps	Goals	Apps	Goals	Apps	Goals	Apps	Goals
USM Alger	2023–24	Ligue 1	12	1	4	2	4 (Note: Appearances in CAF Confederation Cup)	0	20	3
Career total			12	1	4	2	4	0	20	3

=== International ===
As of match played 3 March 2024

Appearances and goals by national team and year
National team	Year	Apps	Goals
Cameroon	2023	1	0
Total		1	0

As of match played
Scores and results list Cameroon's goal tally first, score column indicates score after each Ateba goal.

== Honours ==
Coton Sport

- Elite One: 2020–21, 2021–22
