= Adam Rasheed =

Danish-Iraqi footballer (born 2006)

Personal information
- Full name: Adam Talib Abdulkhaleq Rasheed
- Date of birth: 10 July 2006 (age 20)
- Place of birth: Frederiksberg, Denmark
- Height: 1.85 m (6 ft 1 in)
- Position: Defender

Team information
- Current team: Al-Shorta
- Number: 2

Youth career
- 2011–2015: Sengeløse
- 2016–2018: Albertslund IF
- 2018–2019: AB Gladsaxe
- 2019–2022: Nordsjælland
- 2022–2024: Aalborg BK
- 2024: Torino
- 2024–2025: Maribor

Senior career*
Years	Team	Apps	(Gls)
2024–2026	Maribor	2	(0)
2026–	Al-Shorta	7	(0)

International career^{‡}
2023–2024	Iraq U20		
2025–	Iraq U23		
2026–	Iraq	2	(0)
- * Club domestic league appearances and goals as of 2 June 2026 ‡ National team caps and goals as of 20 November 2026

Adam Talib Abdulkhaleq Rasheed (Arabic: آدَم طَالِب عَبْد الْخَالِق رَشِيد; born 10 July 2006) is a professional footballer who plays as a defender for Iraq Stars League club Al-Shorta. Born in Denmark, he represents the Iraq national team internationally.

== Early life ==
Rasheed was born on 10 July 2006 in Copenhagen, Denmark to a Lithuanian mother and an Iraqi father, who moved to Denmark in 1996 as a political refugee. He attended high school in Aalborg.

== Club career ==
On 6 August 2024, Rasheed signed a two-year contract with Slovenian PrvaLiga side Maribor on a free transfer from Torino.

== International career ==
Rasheed was part of the Iraq under-20 team that reached the final of the 2023 AFC U-20 Asian Cup. With the same team, he also appeared at the 2023 FIFA U-20 World Cup, where he played the full 90 minutes in all three group stage matches.

== Honours ==
Iraq U20

- AFC U-20 Asian Cup runner-up: 2023
