= Al-Shorta Stadium =

Stadium in Baghdad, Iraq

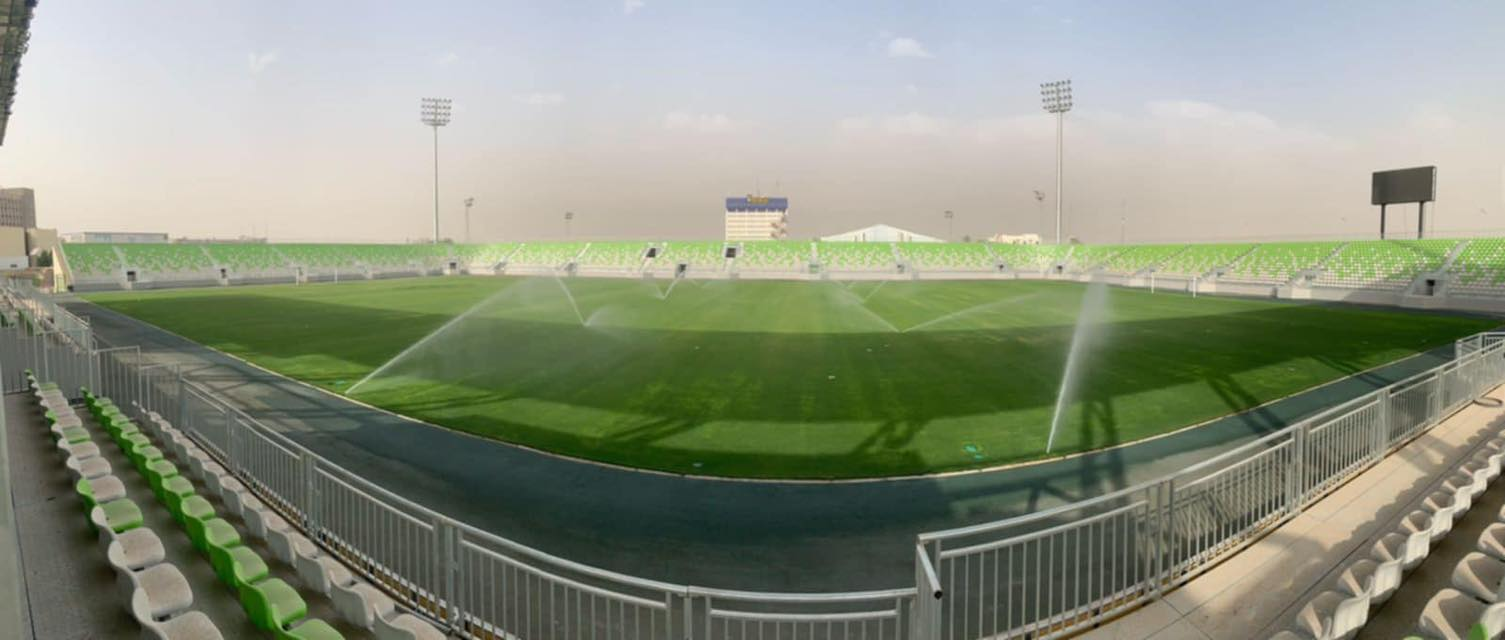
- Al-Shorta Stadium in 2025
- Interactive map of Al-Shorta Stadium
- Full name: Al-Shorta Sports Club Stadium
- Location: Falastin Street, Baghdad, Iraq
- Coordinates: 33°20′22″N 44°26′08″E
- Owner: Ministry of Interior
- Operator: Al-Shorta Sports Club
- Capacity: 10,089
- Surface: Grass
- Field size: 105 m × 68 m (114.8 yd × 74.4 yd)

Construction
- Built: 2014–2025
- Opened: 8 November 2025; 11 months ago
- Architect: Nordic Sport
- Builder: Nynord
- Project manager: Majid Al-Jaderi
- Structural engineer: AKG Engineering

Tenant
- Al-Shorta (2025–present)

Website
- alshortasc.com

Al-Shorta Stadium (Arabic: ملعب الشرطة) is a football stadium in Baghdad, Iraq. It is the home stadium of Iraq Stars League club Al-Shorta. It opened in 2025 on the site of the original Al-Shorta Stadium, which had stood from 1990 until 2014. It has a seating capacity of 10,089.

The construction of the stadium was initiated as the centrepiece of the Al-Shorta Sports City project, which was also planned to include a training ground, a hotel, a club office, a swimming pool, a multi-purpose closed hall, a recreation club, restaurants, theatres and a shopping centre. The project was announced in 2013 and construction began in 2014, but it was suspended in 2015 due to instability in the country and disputes over payments. The project resumed in late 2022 but was scaled down to only include the all-seater stadium and training ground.

The stadium is located at the club's headquarters on Falastin Street, adjacent to the Ministry of Water Resources building in Al-Rusafa.

== History ==
=== Early grounds ===
In their early years, the Al-Shorta Select XI played their home matches on the playing field at the team's headquarters, located on what would become Falastin Street in the early 1960s. After the establishment of the Iraqi National Clubs League, the club played their home games at the Local Administration Stadium in Al-Mansour and later at Al-Furusiya Stadium owned by the Ministry of Interior.

In the 1980s, the club decided to build their own stadium at the club's headquarters, with construction of the four stands being overseen by club president Abdul-Qadir Zeinal and work being carried out by club workers and volunteers. Al-Shorta Stadium was opened for its first match on 23 December 1990 with Al-Shorta beating Al-Tijara 3–2. The stadium was able to hold 8,634 people. A white hall was also constructed on the side of the field (named the Abid Kadhim Hall in honour of former player and manager Abid Kadhim), which can hold approximately 2,000 people.

Aside from a small number of seats in the roofed VIP section of the main stand, the stadium did not have seats. Instead, each stand was arranged as a series of rising steps.

=== Planning ===
After being elected as the club's new president on 18 May 2012, Ayad Bunyan presented the idea of constructing a new sports complex for the club, citing the need to improve the club's infrastructure across various sports. The new Al-Shorta Sports City project was formally announced on 30 January 2013 at an initial estimated cost of 42.5 billion Iraqi dinars. The complex would include an all-seater stadium and a training ground with an athletics track, as well as a hotel, a club office, an indoor swimming pool with 1,500 seats, a multi-purpose closed hall with 2,500 seats, a recreation club with sports facilities, restaurants, theatres and a shopping centre. It would be constructed by a consortium of Swedish company Nordic Sport and Emirati company AKG Engineering, with materials and other construction services also being provided by Swedish companies Royal Arena Sport and Rantzows, and turf being provided by Dutch companies Redexim and Edel Grass.

On 18 March 2013, Nordic Sport released the initial designs for Al-Shorta Sports City, ahead of signing the official contract for the project with the Ministry of Interior at the end of the following month. Börje Österberg, the owner of Nordic Sport, announced the initiation of construction of Al-Shorta Sports City on 16 December 2013. The club also signed a sponsorship deal with Royal Arena Sport (later renamed to Nynord), a regional partner of Nordic Sport led by project director Majid Al-Jaderi, which saw Royal Arena Sport's logo being displayed on the club's shirts for their 2014 AFC Champions League qualifying play-off match and subsequently for the remainder of the 2013–14 season. The sponsorship deal was renewed for the 2014–15 season.

=== Construction ===
The original Al-Shorta Stadium was demolished in March 2014, and the foundation stone laying ceremony for the new Al-Shorta Sports City complex took place on 14 April 2014, with the Senior Deputy Minister of the Interior, Adnan al-Assadi, laying the foundation stone. Construction work officially commenced on 17 October 2014 following the arrival of the iron structures required to build the stadium from Europe. Al-Shorta played their home matches at Al-Shaab Stadium while the new stadium was being constructed.

On 7 January 2015, AKG Engineering released a video showing what the sports complex was expected to look like once construction was completed. The stadium was to have green and purple seats, with the club's name in Arabic and English spelled out in white seats in the main stand. The main stand would also have a purple roof over it, while the entrance to the sports complex would be constructed in the shape of a harp to reflect the club's nickname. Construction work continued at the site up until December 2015, at which point the project was suspended due to an executive order from the government halting all construction projects that had not reached a certain completion stage, resulting from the financial deficit in the country caused by the war with ISIS. Various efforts were made by club officials and the Ministry of Youth and Sports to resume construction of Al-Shorta Sports City, however disputes between the contracting companies and the Ministry of Interior over the schedule of payments led to continued delays in the resumption of the project. A number of protests were held by Al-Shorta supporters demanding the resumption of the project during the period of suspension.

Construction work resumed on the project in November 2022 following a meeting between Abdul-Amir Al-Shammari (the Minister of Interior), Mohammed Al-Khassaki (the chairman of AKG Engineering) and Majid Al-Jaderi (the regional manager of Nordic Sport). However, the project was scaled down to only include the all-seater stadium and the training ground. An updated design was revealed for the stadium in October 2023, which saw the colour of the seats changed to green and white, and the colour of the roof over the main stand was also changed to white. Discussions were also held about the possibility of roofing the entire stadium, and a proposal to this effect was made to the Ministry of Interior, however it was not adopted.

Construction of the training ground was completed on 10 November 2024, while construction of the all-seater stadium was mostly completed by the end of February 2025, with further work on the main stand, stadium lighting, dressing rooms, press rooms and stadium exterior being carried out over the following months.

=== Opening ===
The stadium was opened on 8 November 2025 for a 30-minute friendly match between Al-Shorta's reserve team and Al-Hudood. The stadium's opening was attended by the Minister of Interior, Abdul-Amir Al-Shammari, and the Minister of Youth and Sports, Ahmed Al-Mubarqa, and the pre-game ceremony featured performances from a number of Iraqi artists. The match was broadcast live by Al-Iraqiya Sports and ended in a goalless draw. The first competitive match held at the stadium was an Iraq Stars League match between Al-Shorta and Zakho on 4 January 2026, which Al-Shorta won 1–0 with an own goal from Zakho defender Gaby Kiki.

== Architecture and facilities ==
The stadium has a seating capacity of 10,089 spectators. The main stand is fully roofed and seats 2,589 people, consisting of seventeen rows of seats that rise several metres above the ground. The main stand is accompanied by a three-story building which houses a VIP box and lounges overlooking the playing field, as well as dressing rooms, rooms for match officials and a press room. The remaining stands are all connected to each other, with a large electronic screen being situated behind one of the goals. The pitch is 105 by 68 metres (115 by 74 yd) in size and the total grass area is 110 by 72 metres (120 by 79 yd).

Dutch company Redexim provided the grass turf for the stadium, which is the same type of grass used by stadiums in Qatar for the 2022 FIFA World Cup. Meanwhile, the training ground uses an artificial surface provided by Dutch company Edel Grass, which is qualified as a FIFA Preferred Producer for football turf.

== See also ==
- List of football stadiums in Iraq
- Lists of stadiums
