= Ahmed Yahya =

Iraqi professional footballer

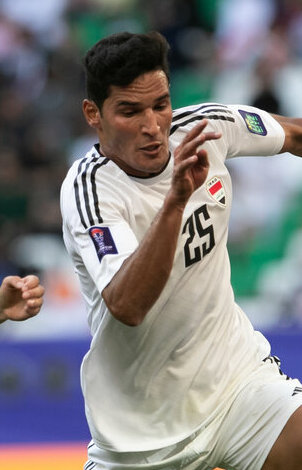
- Yahya with Iraq in 2023

Personal information
- Full name: Ahmed Yahya Mahmoud Al-Hajjaj
- Date of birth: 1 July 1995 (age 31)
- Place of birth: Shatt Al-Arab, Basra, Iraq
- Height: 1.87 m (6 ft 2 in)
- Position: Left-back

Team information
- Current team: Al-Shorta
- Number: 15

Senior career*
Years	Team	Apps	(Gls)
–2020	Masafi Al-Janoob		
2020–2022	Al-Minaa		
2022–	Al-Shorta	106	(6)

International career^{‡}
2023–	Iraq	20	(0)
- * Club domestic league appearances and goals as of 16 September 2026 ‡ National team caps and goals as of 6 June 2026

Ahmed Yahya Mahmoud Al-Hajjaj (Arabic: أَحْمَد يَحْيَى مَحْمُود الْحَجَّاج, born 1 July 1995) is an Iraqi professional footballer who currently plays for Iraq Stars League club Al-Shorta and the Iraq national team.

== International career ==
On 16 June 2023, Yahya earned his first international cap with Iraq against Colombia in a friendly match.

On 1 June, he was named in the 26-man squad for the 2026 FIFA World Cup. However, he sustained a hamstring injury during a friendly match against Spain and was replaced by Ahmed Maknzi on June 6.

== Honours ==
Al-Shorta

- Iraq Stars League: 2022–23, 2023–24, 2024–25
- Iraq FA Cup: 2023–24
- Iraqi Super Cup: 2022

Individual

- Basra International Tournament Best Player: 2026
