= Mohanad Ali =

Iraqi footballer (born 2000)

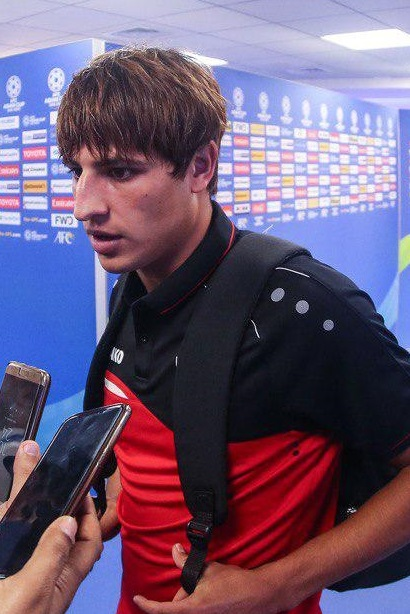
- Mohanad Ali in 2019 with Iraq

Personal information
- Full name: Mohanad Ali Kadhim Al-Shammari
- Date of birth: 20 June 2000 (age 26)
- Place of birth: Baghdad, Iraq
- Height: 1.83 m (6 ft 0 in)
- Position: Striker

Team information
- Current team: Al-Shorta
- Number: 18

Youth career
- 2006–2010: Ammo Baba School
- 2010–2013: Al-Quwa Al-Jawiya
- 2013–2014: Al-Shorta

Senior career*
Years	Team	Apps	(Gls)
2014–2019	Al-Shorta	77	(36)
2016–2017	→ Al-Kahrabaa (loan)	31	(12)
2017	→ Al-Naft (loan)	0	(0)
2019–2023	Al-Duhail	9	(1)
2020	→ Portimonense (loan)	6	(0)
2020–2021	→ Al-Sailiya (loan)	19	(7)
2021–2022	→ Aris (loan)	3	(0)
2022–2023	→ Al-Sailiya (loan)	2	(1)
2023–2025	Al-Shorta	64	(43)
2025–2026	Dibba	20	(6)
2026–	Al-Shorta		

International career^{‡}
2013–2014	Iraq U14	10	(12)
2014–2015	Iraq U16	4	(5)
2018	Iraq U23	2	(0)
2017–	Iraq	73	(27)
- * Club domestic league appearances and goals as of 5 July 2026 ‡ National team caps and goals as of 16 June 2026

Mohanad Ali Kadhim Al-Shammari (Arabic: مُهَنَّد عَلِيّ كَاظِم الشَّمَّرِيّ, born 20 June 2000), commonly known in Iraq as Mimi (Arabic: ميمي), is an Iraqi professional footballer who plays as a forward for Iraq Stars League club Al-Shorta and the Iraq national team. He is known for his positioning, shooting, heading, close ball control and dribbling.

== Club career ==
=== Youth career ===
Ali became interested in football as a child and started playing for a local team in the Baghdad Al-Jadida district called Timsah Al-Amin. He enrolled at the Ammo Baba Football School at the age of six without a trial after coaches had been impressed with the striker. He then joined the Al-Quwa Al-Jawiya youth team, and he represented them in the Al-Zawraa Youth Championship; he was top scorer at two local tournaments, and was then called up by the Iraq FA to play for Saad Hashim's under-14 team, and with an outstanding performance, he grabbed the attention of the managers of Al-Shorta.

=== Al-Shorta ===
==== Early years ====
On 24 September 2013, Ali signed a five-year contract with Al-Shorta and took the number 26 shirt. He became the youngest player in Iraqi Premier League history at 13 years and 279 days old when he made his competitive debut for Al-Shorta under Brazilian coach Lorival Santos in the 2013–14 Iraqi Premier League, being substituted onto the field on 85 minutes in the Baghdad Derby against Al-Talaba on 26 March 2014. Al-Shorta topped the league standings with 43 points from 21 games, although the league was ended prematurely due to the war situation in the country.

In the 2014–15 season, Mohanad played in a four-team friendly competition called the Tournament for the Armed Forces, scoring a penalty in the semi-final shootout which Al-Shorta lost to Al-Quwa Al-Jawiya. Mohanad was given the number 8 shirt for the 2015–16 season under coach Hakeem Shaker and he scored his first goal for Al-Shorta on 20 September 2015 against Al-Sinaa in the 2015–16 Iraqi Premier League with a header. He made two starts and nine substitute appearances in the group stage of the league, where Al-Shorta finished 4th in Group 2 to qualify to the Elite Stage. In the Elite Stage, the club finished in 7th position and Mohanad was used as a substitute for three of their six matches.

He spent the 2016–17 season on loan at Baghdad club Al-Kahrabaa, and finished as the top scorer for the club with 12 goals in 31 league matches, including scoring four goals in the same match against Al-Karkh on 4 January. The club finished 13th in the league. In August 2017, Ali signed for Al-Naft on loan, however Al-Shorta decided to terminate the loan shortly afterwards.

==== 2017–18 season ====
Ali returned to Al-Shorta and renewed his contract in October 2017 for three years, taking the number 18 shirt. He scored his first two goals of the season against Naft Al-Junoob in a 2–1 victory in January 2018. He continued to score regularly throughout the season, forming a partnership with fellow striker Alaa Abdul-Zahra. He scored his first Baghdad Derby goal against Al-Zawraa on 20 January and scoring in another Baghdad Derby against Al-Talaba on 30 January. He finished his season with the team with 16 goals and assisted 8 times in 32 appearances in the league. The team finished in 4th position.

==== 2018–19 season ====
Ali began his season with his team with a new coach, Nebojša Jovović, to exploit his speed as he also took on increasing defensive and creative duties. Mohanad scored his first goal and provided an assist in a 3–1 away win over Naft Al-Junoob on 21 October. He scored his second and third in a 3–0 win against Al-Sinaat Al-Kahrabaiya. On 7 November, Mohanad scored his fourth goal against former club Al-Kahrabaa. His fifth and sixth goal with his team came on 24 November including an impressive solo effort, and he scored another extraordinary goal against Al-Naft on 4 March 2019. Mohanad scored 20 goals and 10 assists in 31 games; he won league with the club.

His good form at club level saw him on the radar of many of European and Asian clubs. After his successful 2019 AFC Asian Cup campaign with the national team, there were official offers made from Italian clubs Juventus and Cagliari, Czech club Slavia Prague, Danish club Midtjylland, Belgian club Genk, Turkish club Galatasaray, Greek club AEK Athens, Emirati club Al-Ain and Qatari club Al-Duhail but Al-Shorta rejected the offers on 29 January 2019, meaning he would spend the rest of the season at Al-Shorta.

The end of the winter transfer window did not stop clubs from expressing their interest in Mohanad, with Al-Shorta's vice-president Abdul-Wahab Al-Taei stating that offers had also now been made by English club Manchester City, Turkish clubs Fenerbahçe, Hatayspor, Yeni Malatyaspor and İstanbul Başakşehir who sent a delegation in April, Russian club Akhmat Grozny, Qatari club Al-Wakrah and an unnamed Japanese club. After months of speculation about which club Mohanad would sign with, he completed a move to Qatari side Al-Duhail in July who agreed to pay an undisclosed fee.

=== Al-Duhail ===
"We contracted with Mohanad because we know his great abilities and we saw him with his national team and today he proved this, and he suffered continuous pressure from Doha and from outside Doha but he had great abilities and everyone saw his special goal today."

— Portuguese coach Rui Faria.

On 15 July 2019, he transferred to Qatari side Al-Duhail on a five-year contract, for a reported fee of $1.2 million. Mohanad made his debut for Al Duhail in the AFC Champions League against Al Sadd on 6 August, coming on as a second-half substitute. He scored his first goal with a solo effort after dribbling past Kara Mbodji and George Kwasi in the 89th minute on 3 October, coming on as a substitute in the 71st minute, in a 2–1 home win against Al-Sailiya.

==== Portimonense (loan) ====
On 30 January 2020, he was sent on loan to Primeira Liga side Portimonense for the rest of the 2019–20 season. Nineteen days later, Mohanad joined the team. He made a debut five days later, coming on as a late substitute for Bruno Tabata in a 0–1 away loss against Porto.

==== Al-Sailiya (loan) ====
On 29 August 2020, he was loaned to Al-Sailiya in Qatar. Mohanad scored on his debut in a 1–1 draw against Al-Rayyan on 3 September. Mohanad helped Al-Sailiya win the Qatari Stars Cup for the first major honour in the club's history, scoring a goal in the final. He also played the first three matches of Al-Sailiya's QFA Cup-winning campaign before suffering a head injury that kept him out of the semi-final and final. Mohanad played 27 games and scored 12 goals and had 3 assists in all competitions.

==== Aris Thessaloniki (loan) ====
On 31 August 2021, Ali was loaned to Super League Greece side Aris Thessaloniki F.C. in the form of a one-year loan and with a purchase option from Al-Duhail. However, after only a few games, Ali damaged his cruciate ligaments, causing him to be sidelined for at least 6 months, to not only miss the majority of the season, but also miss the rest of the World Cup qualifiers with the Iraq national team.

=== Return to Al-Shorta ===
In September 2023, Ali returned to Iraq to join his former club Al-Shorta.

== International career ==
=== Youth ===
Ali made his debut for Iraq's Under-14s in 2013 at the age of just 13. He was the joint-top scorer at the 2013 Asian Youth Games with six goals in Nanjing in August 2013, where the Iraq beat Singapore, Kuwait and Thailand in the quarterfinals before they lost to Iran in the semis and the third-place playoff on penalties to North Korea. In the first ever edition of the AFC U-14 Championship in 2014 in Iran, Mohanad won the top-scorer award with six goals and his team won the cup. In the 2015 WAFF U-16 Championship, Mohanad won the top scorer award with five goals and his team won the championship.

=== Senior ===
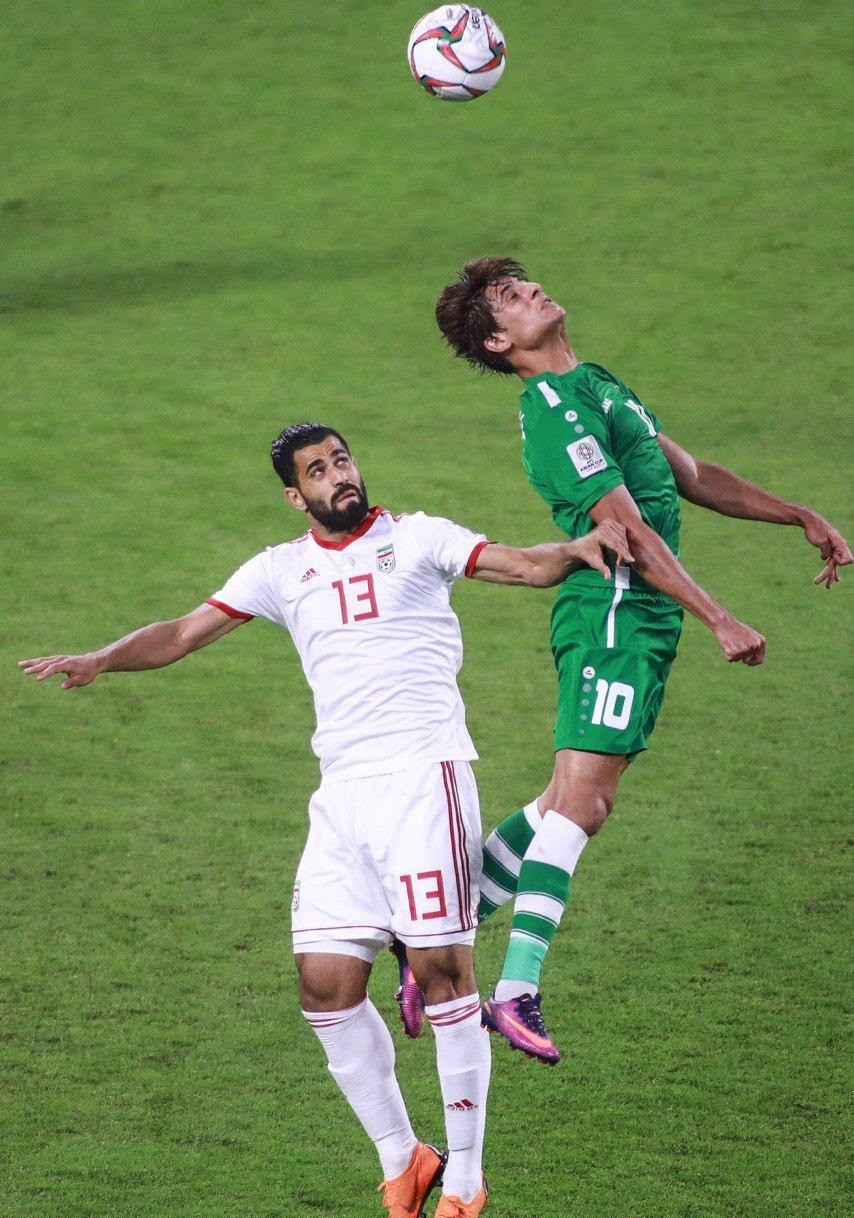
Mohanad playing for Iraq at the 2019 AFC Asian Cup.

He played his first match for the Iraq national team in a friendly against United Arab Emirates on 17 December 2017. He scored for Iraq in an unofficial friendly game against Iraqi Premier League club Naft Al-Junoob on 24 February 2018. His first and second international goals for Iraq were in a friendly match against Saudi Arabia on 28 February 2018.

He played against Argentina on 11 October 2018, coming on as a second-half substitute. He was nominated by the Asian Football Confederation (AFC) as one of the top young talents; he was described as the youngest player who has the potential to changing the shape of the game before 2019 AFC Asian Cup.

He scored his seventh goal against Vietnam on 8 January 2019, and his eighth against Yemen on 12 January 2019, followed by a goal against Jordan to help Iraq win the 2019 International Friendship Championship. Mohanad went on to score five more goals by the end of 2019. After his performance at the 2019 AFC Asian Cup and 2022 FIFA World Cup qualification, he was voted the 2019 West Asian Footballer of the Year and was also included in Chinese newspaper Titan Sports "Best Footballer in Asia 2019", which listed 26 of best footballers.

== Style of play ==
“We always trust Mohanad. He has good feet, he can connect powerfully with headers and he is very clever in the box."

— Iraq youth coach Saad Hashim speaking on Mohanad.

Ali is talented player with good technique and close control, who is an adept header of the ball, and who has an ability to score impressive goals, in the air or with either foot, courtesy of his shooting ability and positional sense. He is physically strong, and is gifted with dribbling skills, anticipation, and confidence in going at opponents with numerical superiority. He is also known for his speed, and his ability beat defenders with sudden turns, as well as his vision, which gave him the ability to link-up with and provide assists for teammates.

== Personal life ==
Ali is a Shammari Shia born in Baghdad. The former international striker Ali Salah is one of his cousins. Mohanad played under the name of his brother Hassan Ali during the 2015–16 and 2016–17 seasons due to an error in his passport. An Iraqi court ruling in 2017 allowed him to obtain a corrected passport, thus enabling him to represent Iraq again. In late September 2020 he tested positive for COVID-19.

== Career statistics ==
=== Club ===
As of 12 July 2025

Appearances and goals by club, season and competition
Club	Season	League			National cup (Note: Includes Iraq FA Cup, Emir of Qatar Cup)		Continental		Other (Note: Includes Qatari Super Cup, Qatar Cup, Qatari Stars Cup and QFA Cup)		Total	
Club	Season	Division	Apps	Goals	Apps	Goals	Apps	Goals	Apps	Goals	Apps	Goals
Al-Shorta	2013–14	Iraqi Premier League	1	0	—		0	0	—		1	0
Al-Shorta	2014–15	Iraqi Premier League	0	0	—		0	0	—		0	0
Al-Shorta	2015–16	Iraqi Premier League	14	1	—		—		—		14	1
Al-Shorta	2017–18	Iraqi Premier League	32	16	—		—		—		32	16
Al-Shorta	2018–19	Iraqi Premier League	30	19	1	1	—		—		31	20
Al-Shorta	Total		77	36	1	1	0	0	—		78	37
Al-Kahrabaa (loan)	2016–17	Iraqi Premier League	31	12	2	0	—		—		33	12
Al-Duhail	2019–20	Qatar Stars League	9	1	—		2 (Note: Appearances in AFC Champions League)	0	2	0	13	1
Portimonense (loan)	2019–20	Primeira Liga	6	0	—		—		—		6	0
Al-Sailiya (loan)	2020–21	Qatar Stars League	19	7	2	3	—		6	2	27	12
Aris (loan)	2021–22	Super League Greece	3	0	0	0	—		—		3	0
Al-Sailiya (loan)	2022–23	Qatar Stars League	2	1	—		—		—		2	1
Al-Shorta	2023–24	Iraq Stars League	30	16	2	1	—		—		32	17
Al-Shorta	2024–25	Iraq Stars League	34	27	3	0	8 (Note: Appearances in AFC Champions League Elite)	1	—		45	28
Al-Shorta	Total		64	43	5	1	8	1	—		77	45
Career total			211	100	10	5	10	1	8	2	239	108

=== International ===
As of 16 June 2026

Appearances and goals by national team and year
National team	Year	Apps	Goals
Iraq	2017	2	0
Iraq	2018	10	6
Iraq	2019	17	8
Iraq	2020	2	1
Iraq	2021	7	2
Iraq	2022	0	0
Iraq	2023	3	1
Iraq	2024	16	3
Iraq	2025	12	6
Iraq	2026	4	0
Total		73	27

Scores and results list Iraq's goal tally first, score column indicates score after each Ali goal.

List of international goals scored by Mohanad Ali
No.	Date	Venue	Opponent	Score	Result	Competition
1	28 February 2018	Basra International Stadium, Basra, Iraq	Saudi Arabia	3–0	4–1	Friendly
2	28 February 2018	Basra International Stadium, Basra, Iraq	Saudi Arabia	4–1	4–1	Friendly
3	27 March 2018	Basra International Stadium, Basra, Iraq	Syria	1–0	1–1	2018 International Friendship Championship
4	10 September 2018	Ali Sabah Al-Salem Stadium, Farwaniya, Kuwait	Kuwait	1–0	2–2	Friendly
5	15 October 2018	King Saud University Stadium, Riyadh, Saudi Arabia	Saudi Arabia	1–0	1–1	2018 Superclásico Championship
6	24 December 2018	Suheim bin Hamad Stadium, Doha, Qatar	China	2–1	2–1	Friendly
7	8 January 2019	Zayed Sports City Stadium, Abu Dhabi, United Arab Emirates	Vietnam	1–1	3–2	2019 AFC Asian Cup
8	12 January 2019	Sharjah Stadium, Sharjah, United Arab Emirates	Yemen	1–0	3–0	2019 AFC Asian Cup
9	26 March 2019	Basra International Stadium, Basra, Iraq	Jordan	3–1	3–2	2019 International Friendship Championship
10	5 September 2019	National Stadium, Manama, Bahrain	Bahrain	1–1	1–1	2022 FIFA World Cup qualification
11	10 October 2019	Basra International Stadium, Basra, Iraq	Hong Kong	1–0	2–0	2022 FIFA World Cup qualification
12	15 October 2019	Olympic Stadium, Phnom Penh, Cambodia	Cambodia	2–0	4–0	2022 FIFA World Cup qualification
13	14 November 2019	Amman International Stadium, Amman, Jordan	Iran	1–0	2–1	2022 FIFA World Cup qualification
14	5 December 2019	Abdullah bin Khalifa Stadium, Doha, Qatar	Bahrain	1–0	2–2 (a.e.t.) (3–5 p)	24th Arabian Gulf Cup
15	17 November 2020	The Sevens Stadium, Dubai, United Arab Emirates	Uzbekistan	1–1	2–1	Friendly
16	29 May 2021	Al-Fayhaa Stadium, Basra, Iraq	Nepal	5–2	6–2	Friendly
17	7 June 2021	Al Muharraq Stadium, Arad, Bahrain	Cambodia	1–0	4–1	2022 FIFA World Cup qualification
18	21 November 2023	Mỹ Đình National Stadium, Hanoi, Vietnam	Vietnam	1–0	1–0	2026 FIFA World Cup qualification
19	15 January 2024	Ahmad bin Ali Stadium, Al Rayyan, Qatar	Indonesia	1–0	3–1	2023 AFC Asian Cup
20	21 March 2024	Basra International Stadium, Basra, Iraq	Philippines	1–0	1–0	2026 FIFA World Cup qualification
21	28 December 2024	Jaber Al-Ahmad International Stadium, Kuwait City, Kuwait	Saudi Arabia	1–1	1–3	26th Arabian Gulf Cup
22	4 September 2025	Kanchanaburi Province Stadium, Kanchanaburi, Thailand	Hong Kong	1–1	2–1	2025 King's Cup
23	4 September 2025	Kanchanaburi Province Stadium, Kanchanaburi, Thailand	Hong Kong	2–1	2–1	2025 King's Cup
24	7 September 2025	Kanchanaburi Province Stadium, Kanchanaburi, Thailand	Thailand	1–0	1–0	2025 King's Cup
25	18 November 2025	Basra International Stadium, Basra, Iraq	United Arab Emirates	1–1	2–1	2026 FIFA World Cup qualification
26	3 December 2025	Stadium 974, Doha, Qatar	Bahrain	2–0	2–1	2025 FIFA Arab Cup
27	6 December 2025	Stadium 974, Doha, Qatar	Sudan	1–0	2–0	2025 FIFA Arab Cup

== Honours ==
Al-Shorta

- Iraq Stars League: 2018–19, 2023–24, 2024–25
- Iraq FA Cup: 2023–24

Al-Duhail

- Qatar Stars League: 2019–20

Al-Sailiya

- Qatari Stars Cup: 2020–21
- QFA Cup: 2021

Iraq U14

- AFC U-14 Championship: 2014

Iraq U16

- WAFF U-16 Championship: 2015

Individual

- Iraq Stars League top scorer: 2024–25
- Asian Youth Games top scorer: 2013
- AFC U-14 Championship top scorer: 2014
- WAFF U-16 Championship top scorer: 2015
- Soccer Iraq Goal of the Season: 2018–19
- AFC Fans' Best Player in West Asia: 2019
- Soccer Iraq Team of the Decade: 2010–2019
- Soccer Iraq Player of the Year: 2025
