= Abdulrazzaq Qasim =

Iraqi footballer (born 2003)

Personal information
- Full name: Abdulrazzaq Qasim Kadeah Subaihawi
- Date of birth: 19 February 2003 (age 23)
- Place of birth: Baghdad, Iraq
- Height: 1.76 m (5 ft 9 in)
- Position: Defensive midfielder

Team information
- Current team: Al-Minaa (on loan from Al-Shorta)
- Number: 25

Youth career
- –2019: Al-Karkh

Senior career*
Years	Team	Apps	(Gls)
2019–2021	Al-Karkh		
2020	→ Al-Shorta (loan)	0	(0)
2021–	Al-Shorta	128	(6)
2026–	→ Al-Minaa (loan)	3	(1)

International career^{‡}
2017–2018	Iraq U16	5	(2)
2019	Iraq U18	10	(3)
2020–2023	Iraq U20	12	(1)
2025–	Iraq U23	13	(0)
2024–	Iraq	0	(0)
- * Club domestic league appearances and goals as of 26 August 2026 ‡ National team caps and goals as of 5 April 2026

Abdulrazzaq Qasim Kadeah (Arabic: عبدالرزاق قاسم كعده; born 19 February 2003) is an Iraqi professional footballer who plays as a midfielder for Iraq Stars League club Al-Minaa on loan from Al-Shorta and captains the Iraq U-23 national team.

== Club career ==
=== Al-Karkh ===
Abdulrazzaq came through the youth academy of Al-Karkh, a club renowned in Iraq for producing talented players, being promoted to the first team in 2019.

=== Al-Shorta ===
Qasim signed for Iraqi giants Al-Shorta on a permanent basis in 2021, winning the Iraqi Premier League in his first season, featuring in 28 league games during his debut season at the club. In 2022, Qasim won the Iraqi Super Cup for the first time, beating his boyhood club Al-Karkh in the final.

Qasim made his continental debut in September 2024 against Saudi giants Al-Nassr in the AFC Champions League Elite, where Al-Shorta pulled off an impressive 1–1 draw in Baghdad in their 2024–25 AFC Champions League Elite opener, with Qasim starting and playing the full match in midfield. He would go on to face fellow Saudi sides Al-Hilal and Al-Ahli, Iranian sides Persepolis and Esteghlal and Emirati side Al-Wasl in his debut ACLE season.

== International career ==
=== Iraq U-16 ===
Qasim was called up to the Iraq U-16 national team in 2017 for the 2018 U-16 Asian Cup qualifiers in Nepal, scoring against Palestine as Iraq topped their group and qualified for the tournament in Malaysia the following year, to which he was also called up.

=== Iraq U-18 ===
Qasim received his first call up to the Iraq U-18 national team ahead of the 2019 U-18 West Asian Championship in Palestine, making his debut against Qatar in a friendly before facing Bahrain, Jordan and the UAE, who he scored against, in the tournament, as Iraq went on to be crowned champions. He won the tournament for the second time, this time as captain, in 2021 on home soil, with Baghdad hosting the final, where Iraq beat Lebanon to take a second straight title. Qasim had scored against Bahrain and Palestine in the group stage.

=== Iraq U-20 ===
In February 2020, Abdulrazzaq was included in Iraq's squad for the U-20 Arab Cup in Saudi Arabia, playing a key role as Iraq made it to the quarter-finals, before being knocked out by Egypt. By the following year, he would be the captain of Iraq's youth team and score twice at the 2021 U-20 Arab Cup in Egypt. In 2023, he led Iraq to the final of the 2023 AFC U-20 Asian Cup, losing to hosts Uzbekistan, qualifying for the 2023 FIFA U-20 World Cup in Argentina that summer. Abdulrazzaq wore the armband for Iraq on the world stage, as they finished bottom of their group with England, Uruguay and Tunisia.

=== Iraq U-23 ===
In 2025, Abdulrazzaq was called up to the Iraq U-23 national team for the U-23 Asian Cup qualifiers in Cambodia, playing in every match and helping Iraq qualify for the finals in Saudi Arabia. Qasim then captained Iraq in the 2026 AFC U-23 Asian Cup, where they would go out in the group stages, finishing third in a group with Australia, China and Thailand.

=== Iraq ===
Qasim was called up to the Iraqi national team for the first time in March 2024, ahead of the Asian Qualifiers for the 2026 FIFA World Cup against the Philippines, where he would remain on the bench and continue waiting for his senior debut.

== Career statistics ==
=== Club ===
As of match played 2 June 2026

Appearances and goals by club, season and competition
Club	Season	League			National cup (Note: Includes Iraq FA Cup)		Continental (Note: Includes AFC Champions League Elite)		Other (Note: Includes Arab Club Champions Cup and Iraqi Super Cup)		Total	
Club	Season	Division	Apps	Goals	Apps	Goals	Apps	Goals	Apps	Goals	Apps	Goals
Al-Shorta	2021–22	Iraqi Premier League	28	0	1	0	—		—		29	0
Al-Shorta	2022–23	Iraqi Premier League	15	1	0	0	—		3	0	18	1
Al-Shorta	2023–24	Iraq Stars League	30	2	4	0	—		—		34	2
Al-Shorta	2024–25	Iraq Stars League	21	1	0	0	6	0	—		27	1
Al-Shorta	2025–26	Iraq Stars League	34	2	—		8	0	—		42	2
Career total			128	6	5	0	14	0	3	0	150	6

== Honours ==
Al-Shorta

- Iraq Stars League: 2021–22, 2022–23, 2023–24, 2024–25
- Iraq FA Cup: 2023–24
- Iraqi Super Cup: 2022

Iraq U-18

- WAFF U-18 Championship: 2019, 2021

Iraq U-20

- AFC U-20 Asian Cup runner-up: 2023

Individual

- Baghdado Awards' Best Midfielder in Iraq: 2022–23
