= Shareef Abdul-Kadhim =

Iraqi footballer (born 1996)

Personal information
- Date of birth: 7 June 1996 (age 30)
- Place of birth: Nasiriyah, Iraq
- Position: Midfielder

Team information
- Current team: Al-Gharraf

Senior career*
| Years | Team | Apps | (Gls) |
- Al-Nasiriya
- Al-Forat
| 2017–2019 | Al-Hedood | | |
| 2019–2024 | Al-Quwa Al-Jawiya | | |
| 2024–2025 | Al-Talaba SC | | |
| 2025–2026 | Al-Shorta | 29 | (5) |
| 2026– | Al-Gharraf | | |

International career^{‡}
| 2019– | Iraq | 2 | (0) |
- * Club domestic league appearances and goals as of 30 June 2026 ‡ National team caps and goals as of 5 December 2019

Shareef Abdul-Kadhim Masabih Al-Imari (Arabic: شَرِيف عَبْد الْكَاظِم مُصْعَب الْعَمَّارِيّ; born 7 June 1996) is an Iraqi footballer who plays as a midfielder for Al-Gharraf in the Iraq Stars League.

== International career ==
On 26 November 2019, Shareef made his first international cap with Iraq against Qatar in the 24th Arabian Gulf Cup.

== Honours ==
Al-Quwa Al-Jawiya

- Iraqi Premier League: 2020–21
- Iraq FA Cup: 2020–21, 2022–23
