= Abdoul Madjid Moumouni =

Nigerien footballer

Personal information
- Full name: Abdoul Madjid Boubacar Moumouni Soumana
- Date of birth: 10 May 1994 (age 32)
- Place of birth: Niamey, Niger
- Height: 1.82 m (6 ft 0 in)
- Position: Midfielder

Team information
- Current team: Al-Shorta
- Number: 14

Senior career*
Years	Team	Apps	(Gls)
2013–2014	Juvenile SC		
2014–2015	AS SONIDEP		
2015–2018	AS FAN		
2018–2019	Al-Merrikh		
2019–2021	Al-Minaa		(2)
2021–	Al-Shorta	142	(12)

International career^{‡}
2018–	Niger	30	(0)
- * Club domestic league appearances and goals as of 2 June 2026 ‡ National team caps and goals as of 21 November 2023

Abdoul Madjid Boubacar Moumouni Soumana (born 10 May 1994) is a Nigerien professional footballer who plays for Iraqi Premier League club Al-Shorta and the Niger national football team.

== International ==
He made his debut for the Niger national football team on 27 May 2018 in a friendly match against Central African Republic.

== Honours ==
AS SONIDEP

- Niger Cup: 2015

AS FAN

- Niger Premier League: 2016, 2017

Al-Shorta

- Iraq Stars League: 2021–22, 2022–23, 2023–24, 2024–25
- Iraq FA Cup: 2023–24
- Iraqi Super Cup: 2022
