= Newroz Stadium =

Stadium in Iraq

Newroz International Stadium یاریگای نێودەوڵەتیی نەورۆز ملعب نوروز الدولي
- Interactive map of Newroz International Stadium یاریگای نێودەوڵەتیی نەورۆز ملعب نوروز الدولي
- Location: Sulaymaniyah, Kurdistan Region, Iraq
- Coordinates: 35°33′30.1″N 45°22′04.9″E
- Owner: Lahur Talabany
- Capacity: 14,500
- Surface: Grass
- Field size: 105 m × 68 m

Construction
- Groundbreaking: 8 October 2020
- Opened: TBD
- Cost: $ 12 million USD
- Services engineer: Sargallu Company
- General contractor: Qunsul company

Tenant
- Newroz SC

Newroz International Stadium is a football stadium in Sulaymaniyah, Kurdistan Region, Iraq. The stadium is used mostly for football matches and will host the home matches of Newroz SC. The stadium has a capacity of 14,500 spectators.

== See also ==
- List of football stadiums in Iraq
