= Ahmed Farhan =

Iraqi footballer

Personal information
- Full name: Ahmed Farhan Mushref Al-Ghalami
- Date of birth: 1 January 1999 (age 27)
- Place of birth: Basra, Iraq
- Height: 1.75 m (5 ft 9 in)
- Position: Midfielder

Team information
- Current team: Al-Shorta
- Number: 17

Youth career
- Al-Mina'a

Senior career*
Years	Team	Apps	(Gls)
2017–2020	Al-Mina'a		(3)
2020–2022	Naft Al-Basra		(16)
2022–	Al-Shorta	93	(18)

International career^{‡}
2021	Iraq U-20		
2021–	Iraq	2	(0)
- * Club domestic league appearances and goals as of 2 June 2026 ‡ National team caps and goals as of 7 December 2021

Ahmed Farhan Mushref Al-Ghalami (Arabic: أَحْمَد فَرْحَان مُشَرَّف الْغُلَامِيّ; born 1 January 1999) is an Iraqi professional footballer who plays as a midfielder for Al-Shorta and the Iraq national team.

== Club career ==
Ahmed broke into the Al-Mina'a first team in 2017 and remained at the club until 2020, scoring three goals before moving to city rivals Naft Al-Basra, where he scored nine goals in his first season at the club.

== International career ==
Farhan was called up to the Iraq national team for the first time for the 2021 FIFA Arab Cup. He started both of Iraq's opening matches against Oman and Bahrain before an injury kept him on the bench for Iraq's final match against Qatar.

== Honours ==
Al-Shorta

- Iraq Stars League: 2022–23, 2023–24, 2024–25
