= Al-Zawraa Stadium =

Football stadium in Baghdad, Iraq

Al-Zawra'a Stadium
- ملعب الزوراء
- Interactive map of Al-Zawra'a Stadium
- Location: Baghdad, Iraq
- Coordinates: 33°20′39″N 44°22′06″E
- Owner: Al Zawraa
- Capacity: 15,443
- Surface: Hybrid grass
- Scoreboard: Yes

Construction
- Opened: 1978 (old stadium); 15 February 2022 (new stadium)
- Services engineer: Boland Payeh Co

Tenants
- Al Zawraa (1978–2011, 2022–present); Al-Shorta SC (selected matches)

Al-Zawra'a Stadium (Arabic: ملعب الزوراء) is an association football stadium located in Baghdad, Iraq. It is currently used mostly for football matches and is the home of Al-Zawraa SC. The stadium was inaugurated in February 2022 and seats 15,443 spectators.

== History ==
The stadium is located in a residential area in the middle of Baghdad. The old stadium held 15,000 people and was built in 1978. In 2011, the construction of a new stadium for Al-Zawraa SC was announced to replace the old stadium and to provide modern sports facilities for the population of Baghdad.

In January 2012, the old stadium was demolished. The demolition and construction of the new Al-Zawra'a Stadium was entrusted to Boland Payeh Co, an Iranian company. The reconstruction has been interrupted several times, mainly due to the economic crisis. This led to considerable delays in completion and constrained the resident club Al-Zawra'a SC to play several seasons at Al-Shaab Stadium.

Initially, apart from the main stadium, the project included the construction of hotel, swimming pool, sports hall, landscaping and access routes to the complex. All these facilities have been cancelled due to lack of funds. Only the stadium project was maintained.

In 2018, the slight improvement in the economic situation contributed to resume the work, under the supervision of former Minister of Youth and Sports Abdul-Hussein Abtaan. More than 2,000 tons of reinforcement rebar, 24,000 m^{3} of concrete and 5,400 m^{2} of formwork were used to complete this project. The earthworks volume surpassed 26,000 m^{3}. However, the rate of work of the Iranian company was relatively slow. The Ministry of Youth and Sports issued several warnings of contract termination to the Boland Payeh company if it did not increase the pace of work.

On 15 February 2022, the new stadium was officially opened on the occasion of an Iraqi Premier League match between Al-Zawra'a SC and Al-Diwaniya FC. Al-Zawraa won 2–0 as Alaa Mhawi scored the club's first goal at the new stadium.

== Facilities ==
=== Capacity ===
Initially, the stadium was designed to hold 12,500 spectators. However, in April 2017 the former Minister of Youth and Sports Abdul-Hussein Abtaan intervened and ordered the operator to increase the capacity by a further 2,500 seats to a total of 15,000. After its completion, the official capacity of the stadium is stated to be 15,443.

=== Hybrid grass ===
Al-Zawra'a Stadium is equipped with a Limonta Mixto hybrid grass (natural grass imported from Italy and combined with synthetic fibres), a patented technology that makes it possible to reinforce the durability and resistance of the grass in order to host a high number of football matches. Each summer, a renovation is carried out in two phases : a scarification that allows the removal of all the natural part, leaving only the synthetic fibres, and in a second phase, new seeds are sown to regenerate the lawn. It takes about 6 weeks to carry out this renovation.

== See also ==
- List of football stadiums in Iraq
