= 2013–14 Al-Shorta SC season =

Al Shorta
2013–14 season
- President: (Iraq) Ayad Bunyan
- Manager: (Brazil) Lorival Santos
- Ground: Al Shorta Stadium (until 9 December); Al Shaab Stadium (from 8 February onwards)
- Iraqi Premier League: 1st (no title awarded)
- AFC Champions League: First qualifying round
- AFC Cup: Group stage
- Top goalscorer: League: Mustafa Karim (7); All: Mustafa Karim (7)
Home colours	Away colours	Third colours

In the 2013–14 season, Al Shorta competed in the 2013–14 Iraqi Premier League and the 2014 AFC Cup after failing to qualify for the 2014 AFC Champions League group stage. They finished in first place in the Iraqi Premier League for the second time in a row, finishing one point ahead of second-placed Arbil FC, however were not crowned champions due to the season ending prematurely and were only considered as champions for the purpose of enabling admission into the AFC Cup. They also played in the AFC Cup but failed to advance past the group stages, playing out four goalless draws out of six games.

The season saw the club appoint their third ever foreign coach, Brazilian Lorival Santos, and sign their first ever Brazilian player, striker Cristiano da Silva Santos. Their top scorer for the season was Iraqi forward Mustafa Karim who scored seven goals in total.

== Squad ==
Note: Flags indicate national team as defined under FIFA eligibility rules; some limited exceptions apply. Players may hold more than one non-FIFA nationality.

No.	Pos.	Nation	Player
2	DF	IRQ	Waleed Salem
3	DF	IRQ	Dhirgham Ismail
4	DF	SYR	Hamdi Al Masri
5	MF	IRQ	Hussein Abdul-Wahed (captain)
6	DF	IRQ	Kassim Zidan
7	FW	IRQ	Sherko Karim
9	FW	IRQ	Mustafa Karim
10	MF	IRQ	Mahdi Kamel
12	GK	IRQ	Mohammed Gassid
14	FW	IRQ	Amjad Kalaf (vice-captain)
16	MF	IRQ	Hamza Hassan
17	FW	IRQ	Ammar Abdul-Hussein
18	MF	IRQ	Mahdi Karim
19	MF	IRQ	Ahmad Ayad

No.	Pos.	Nation	Player
22	DF	CMR	Innocent Awoa
23	GK	IRQ	Mohammed Hameed
24	MF	IRQ	Qusay Munir
26	FW	IRQ	Mohanad Ali
27	FW	IRQ	Karrar Hameed
28	MF	IRQ	Haider Muthanna
29	DF	IRQ	Ahmed Hassan
30	FW	BRA	Cristiano
31	GK	IRQ	Nebras Salman
33	DF	IRQ	Ali Bahjat
35	MF	IRQ	Ahmad Fadhel
—	GK	IRQ	Amjed Salem
—	MF	IRQ	Mohammed Hadi

=== Out on loan ===
Note: Flags indicate national team as defined under FIFA eligibility rules; some limited exceptions apply. Players may hold more than one non-FIFA nationality.

No.	Pos.	Nation	Player
—	MF	IRQ	Husain Abdullah (at Al Zawraa until the end of the 2013-14 season)
—	MF	IRQ	Haider Salim (at Al Masafi until the end of the 2013-14 season)

=== Departed during season ===
Note: Flags indicate national team as defined under FIFA eligibility rules; some limited exceptions apply. Players may hold more than one non-FIFA nationality.

No.	Pos.	Nation	Player
8	DF	BFA	Paul Koulibaly
11	FW	IRQ	Hussein Karim
15	MF	IRQ	Nashat Akram
20	FW	IRQ	Ahmad Hussein

== Backroom staff and club officials ==
Name	Position
(Brazil) Lorival Santos	Manager
(Brazil) Anderson Nicolau	Assistant manager/Fitness Coach
(Iraq) Walid Juma	Fitness coach
(Brazil) Marquinhos Domingues	Goalkeeping coach
(Iraq) Hashim Ridha	Administrative Director
(Iraq) Sirwan Raouf	Administrative Assistant
(Iraq) Bilal Hussein	Administrator
(Iraq) Abdulrahman Ali	Technical Processor
(Iraq) Haider Abdul-Zahra	Assistant Technical Processor
(Brazil) Tonello Marilia	Physiotherapist
(Brazil) Felipe Biazotto	Physiologist

=== Boardroom positions ===
Position	Name	Nationality
Chairman:	Ayad Bunyan	(Iraq)
Vice-chairman:	Adnan Jafar	(Iraq)
Member of the Board:	Ghazi Faisal	(Iraq)
Member of the Board:	Salam Faraj	(Iraq)
Member of the Board:	Ali Abdul-Zahra	(Iraq)

== Kit ==
Period	Home colours	Away colours	Away colours (Asia)	Third colours	Supplier	Sponsor
October 2013		—		—	Adidas	—
November 2013 – December 2013		—		—	Nike	—
February 2014				—	Nike	Royal Arena Sport
February 2014 – June 2014					Nike	Royal Arena Sport

== Transfers ==
=== In ===
Date	Pos.	Name	From	Fee
September 2013	Administrative Director	(Iraq) Hashim Ridha	Free agent	-
September 2013	DF	(Iraq) Ali Bahjat	(Iraq) Dohuk FC	-
September 2013	FW	(Iraq) Ahmad Hussein	(Iraq) Al Kahraba	-
September 2013	FW	(Iraq) Ammar Abdul-Hussein	(Iraq) Arbil FC	-
September 2013	FW	(Iraq) Mustafa Karim	(Iraq) Al Quwa Al Jawiya	-
September 2013	MF	(Iraq) Qusay Munir	(Iraq) Baghdad FC	-
September 2013	Technical Advisor	(Iraq) Nazar Ashraf	Free agent	-
September 2013	Manager	(Brazil) Lorival Santos	(Brazil) Treze	-
September 2013	Assistant manager/Fitness Coach	(Brazil) Anderson Nicolau	(Brazil) Betim	-
September 2013	Goalkeeping coach	(Brazil) Marquinhos Domingues		-
September 2013	FW	(Iraq) Mohanad Ali		-
October 2013	MF	(Iraq) Mahdi Karim	(Iraq) Arbil FC	-
October 2013	DF	(Syria) Hamdi Al Masri	(Iraq) Al Naft	-
October 2013	GK	(Iraq) Wissam Adel	(Iraq) Naft Al Junoob	-
October 2013	GK	(Iraq) Nebras Salman	(Iraq) Sulaymaniya FC	-
October 2013	FW	(Brazil) Cristiano	(Brazil) Betim	-
November 2013	MF	(Iraq) Mohammed Hadi	Free agent	-
November 2013	GK	(Iraq) Amjed Salem	Free agent	-

=== Out ===
Date	Pos.	Name	To	Fee
September 2013	FW	(Nigeria) Minusu Buba	(Egypt) El Gouna FC	End of loan
September 2013	FW	(Iraq) Muslim Mubarak	(Iraq) Al Talaba	-
September 2013	Manager	(Iraq) Thair Jassam		-
September 2013	Assistant manager	(Jordan) Haitham Al-Shboul		-
September 2013	Fitness coach	(Iraq) Hassan Darwich		-
September 2013	Goalkeeping coach	(Iraq) Abdul Raouf Alteka		-
September 2013	MF	(Iraq) Husain Abdullah	(Iraq) Al Zawraa	Loan
September 2013	FW	(Iraq) Muhaimen Salim	(Iraq) Al Zawraa	-
September 2013	MF	(Iraq) Haider Salim	(Iraq) Al Masafi	Loan
September 2013	MF	(Iraq) Mohammed Faisel	(Iraq) Al Naft	-
September 2013	DF	(Iraq) Zeid Khalaf	(Iraq) Al Masafi	-
September 2013	DF	(Iraq) Fareed Majeed		-
September 2013	DF	(Iraq) Omar Sabah		-
September 2013	MF	(Iraq) Ali Rahim	(Iraq) Al Naft	-
October 2013	GK	(Iraq) Ali Husain	(Iraq) Zakho FC	-
October 2013	MF	(Iraq) Ali Hussein Fandi	(Iraq) Duhok FC	-
October 2013	DF	(Iraq) Ali Abd Ali	(Iraq) Al Karkh	-
October 2013	GK	(Iraq) Wissam Adel	(Iraq) Al Karkh	-
October 2013	DF	(Iraq) Ali Mohammed Alialah	(Iraq) Al Talaba	-
January 2014	FW	(Iraq) Ahmad Hussein	(Iraq) Zakho FC	-
January 2014	FW	(Iraq) Hussein Karim	(Iraq) Al Zawraa	-
February 2014	MF	(Iraq) Nashat Akram	(China) Dalian Aerbin	-
February 2014	Technical Advisor	(Iraq) Nazar Ashraf		-
April 2014	DF	(Burkina Faso) Paul Koulibaly		-

== Matches ==
=== Pre-season friendlies ===
22 October 2013 Friendly	Al Shorta	2 – 1	Al Minaa	Baghdad
12:30 GMT	Amjad Kalaf 16'; Mustafa Karim 36' (pen.)		Naif Faleh 71'	Stadium: Al Shorta Stadium

24 October 2013 Friendly	Al Shorta	1 – 0	Karbala FC	Baghdad
12:30 GMT	Mustafa Karim 62'			Stadium: Al Shorta Stadium

=== Mid-season friendlies ===
18 November 2013 Friendly	Al Shorta	0 – 0	Al Oloom wal Technologia	Baghdad
12:00 GMT				Stadium: Al Shorta Stadium

1 December 2013 Friendly	Al Shorta	3 – 1	Al Jaish	Baghdad
11:30 GMT	Cristiano; Innocent Awoa; Hamza Hassan		Goal	Stadium: Al Shorta Stadium

31 December 2013 Friendly	Al Shorta	3 – 0	Naft Maysan	Baghdad
10:00 GMT	Cristiano 9', 48'; Ammar Abdul-Hussein 14'			Stadium: Al Shorta Stadium

7 January 2014 Friendly	Al Shorta	5 – 2	Al Karkh	Baghdad
11:30 GMT	Ammar Abdul-Hussein 15'; Cristiano 23'; Mahdi Karim 55' (pen.); Mustafa Karim 71', 85'		Ali Abd Dyab 75' (pen.); Karrar Mohammed 79' (pen.)	Stadium: Al Shorta Stadium

14 January 2014 Friendly	Tala'ea El-Gaish	1 – 1	Al Shorta	Cairo
13:00 GMT	Islam Kamal 63' (pen.)		Cristiano	Stadium: Cairo Military Academy Stadium

17 January 2014 Friendly	Al Shorta	2 – 2	Al Tadamun	Cairo
12:00 GMT	Nashat Akram 22'; Cristiano 38'		Goal

28 January 2014 Friendly	Al Shorta	1 – 0	Al Zawraa	Baghdad
11:00 GMT	Cristiano 9'			Stadium: Al Shorta Stadium

26 April 2014 Friendly	Samawa FC	1 – 1	Al Shorta	Samawa
	Mohammed Hassan (pen.)		Ali Bahjat	Stadium: Al Muthanna Stadium
Note: This was a charity match which saw the participation of the retired striker Hashim Ridha for Al Shorta.

=== Competitive ===
==== Iraqi Premier League ====
29 October 2013 1	Al Zawraa	0 – 1	Al Shorta	Baghdad
12:00 GMT	Ali Khudhair (red card) 58'		Mustafa Karim 66'; Cristiano (penalty missed) 90+4'	Stadium: Al Shaab Stadium

3 November 2013 2	Al Shorta	2 – 1	Naft Maysan	Baghdad
11:45 GMT	Mustafa Karim 34' (pen.); Cristiano 90+4'		Khodor Salame 28'	Stadium: Al Shorta Stadium

24 November 2013 3	Najaf FC	0 – 0	Al Shorta	Najaf
11:30 GMT				Stadium: An Najaf Stadium

29 November 2013 4	Al Shorta	5 – 0	Duhok FC	Baghdad
11:30 GMT	Dhirgham Ismail 27'; Mustafa Karim 60', 68'; Hamdi Al Masri 72'; Waleed Salem 90+3'			Stadium: Al Shorta Stadium

4 December 2013 5	Al Karkh	0 – 2	Al Shorta	Karkh
11:30 GMT			Nashat Akram 44'; Mustafa Karim 48' (pen.)	Stadium: Al Karkh Stadium

9 December 2013 6	Al Shorta	1 – 1	Al Minaa	Baghdad
11:30 GMT	Mustafa Karim 45' (pen.)		Basem Ali 85'	Stadium: Al Shorta Stadium

14 December 2013 7	Zakho FC	1 – 0	Al Shorta	Zakho
11:30 GMT	Khalid Musheer 73' (pen.)			Stadium: Zakho Stadium

8 February 2014 8	Al Shorta	2 – 1	Arbil FC	Baghdad
11:30 GMT	Mahdi Karim 23' (pen.); Cristiano 30'		Amjad Radhi 78' (pen.)	Stadium: Al Shaab Stadium

14 February 2014 9	Al Naft	0 – 0	Al Shorta	Baghdad
11:30 GMT				Stadium: Al Naft Stadium

26 March 2014 10	Al Talaba	1 – 2	Al Shorta	Baghdad
13:00 GMT	Ali Salah 90+4'		Ahmad Ayad 20'; Amjad Kalaf 34' (pen.)	Stadium: Al Shaab Stadium

13 April 2014 11	Naft Maysan	1 – 3	Al Shorta	Amarah
13:00 GMT	Mustafa Al Ameen 52'		Karrar Hameed 62'; Dhirgham Ismail 68', 84'; Mahdi Kamel (red card) 85'	Stadium: Al-Maimouna Stadium

18 April 2014 12	Al Shorta	1 – 0	Al Quwa Al Jawiya	Baghdad
13:00 GMT	Sherko Karim 76'			Stadium: Al Shaab Stadium

4 May 2014 13	Al Shorta	1 – 0	Al Talaba	Baghdad
13:00 GMT	Amjad Kalaf 6'			Stadium: Al Shaab Stadium

9 May 2014 14	Al Shorta	1 – 0	Najaf FC	Baghdad
13:30 GMT	Mahdi Karim 2'			Stadium: Al Shaab Stadium

15 May 2014 15	Duhok FC	2 – 2	Al Shorta	Duhok
13:30 GMT	Alaa Abdul-Zahra 45+2'; Ahmed Abdul-Ameer 53'		Amjad Kalaf 17'; Mustafa Karim 86'	Stadium: Duhok Stadium

20 May 2014 16	Baghdad FC	1 – 2	Al Shorta	Baghdad
13:30 GMT	Ali Rabo (red card) 34'; Mustafa Ahmad 80'		Ali Bahjat 44'; Sherko Karim 88'	Stadium: Baghdad FC Stadium

26 May 2014 17	Karbala FC	0 – 0	Al Shorta	Karbala
13:30 GMT	Cleyton (penalty missed) 81'			Stadium: Karbala Stadium

1 June 2014 18	Al Shorta	2 – 2	Al Karkh	Baghdad
13:30 GMT	Hamdi Al Masri 22'; Amjad Kalaf 87'		Abdul-Qadir Tariq 38'; Aboubacar Tambadou 63'	Stadium: Al Shaab Stadium

6 June 2014 19	Al Minaa	0 – 0	Al Shorta	Basra
13:45 GMT				Stadium: Al Mina'a Stadium

11 June 2014 20	Al Shorta	1 – 0	Zakho FC	Baghdad
13:45 GMT	Ahmad Ayad 13'		Raja Rafe (red card); Hamid Ismael (red card)	Stadium: Al Shaab Stadium

15 June 2014 21	Al Shorta	1 – 2	Naft Al Junoob	Baghdad
13:45 GMT	Hamdi Al Masri (red card) 44'; Qusay Munir (red card) 60'; Dhirgham Ismail 65' (pen.)		Faisal Kadhim 2'; De Santos 59'; Faris Hassan (red card) 90+4'	Stadium: Al Shaab Stadium

===== Classification =====
Pos	Team	Pld	W	D	L	GF	GA	GD	Pts	Qualification
1	Al-Shorta	21	12	7	2	29	13	+16	43	Qualification for the AFC Cup group stage
2	Erbil	21	12	6	3	29	15	+14	42	Qualification for the AFC Cup group stage
3	Baghdad	23	11	7	5	33	22	+11	40	
4	Al-Quwa Al-Jawiya	22	10	7	5	32	21	+11	37	
5	Naft Al-Junoob	23	9	9	5	26	22	+4	36	

Source: Goalzz
Rules for classification: 1) points; 2) goal difference; 3) number of goals scored.

==== Results summary ====
Overall								Home						Away					
Pld	W	D	L	GF	GA	GD	Pts	W	D	L	GF	GA	GD	W	D	L	GF	GA	GD
21	12	7	2	29	13	+16	43	7	2	1	17	7	+10	5	5	1	12	6	+6

Source: Goalzz

==== AFC Champions League ====
2 February 2014 First qualifying round	Kuwait SC	1 – 0	Al Shorta	Kuwait City, Kuwait
16:30 GMT	Rogério de Assis Coutinho (yellow card) 57'; Javad Nekounam 63'; Musab Al Kandari (yellow card) 72'		Cristiano (yellow card) 53'; Innocent Awoa (yellow card) 65'; Ahmad Fadhel (yellow card) 85'; Qusay Munir (yellow card) 87'; Hussein Abdul-Wahed (yellow card) 90+1'	Stadium: Al Kuwait Sports Club Stadium; Attendance: 1,450; Referee: Mohammed Abdulla Hassan Mohamed

==== AFC Cup ====
===== Group stage =====
Team	Pld	W	D	L	GF	GA	GD	Pts
(Kuwait) Al-Qadsia	6	3	2	1	11	5	+6	11 (Note: Tiebreakers: Al-Qadsia and Al-Hidd are ranked on head-to-head record.)
(Bahrain) Al-Hidd	6	3	2	1	10	6	+4	11
(Iraq) Al-Shorta	6	1	4	1	3	4	−1	7
(Syria) Al-Wahda	6	0	2	4	5	14	−9	2

Notes:

26 February 2014 1	Al Shorta	0 – 0	Al Qadsia	Al Wakrah, Qatar
14:00 GMT	Paul Koulibaly (yellow card) 62'; Mohammed Gassid (yellow card) 90+3'		Nawaf Al-Mutairi (yellow card) 53'; Abdulrahman Al Enezi (yellow card) 64'; Musaed Neda (yellow card) 67'	Stadium: Saoud bin Abdulrahman Stadium; Attendance: 200; Referee: Yaqoob Abdul Baqi

12 March 2014 2	Al Wahda	1 – 3	Al Shorta	Sidon, Lebanon
12:00 GMT	Mohamed Bash Buyuk 30'; Ali Diab (yellow card) 47'		Amjad Kalaf (yellow card) 10', (goal) 59', 60'; Mahdi Karim 90+3' (pen.)	Stadium: Saida Municipal Stadium; Attendance: 0 Referee: Charymurat Kurbanov

18 March 2014 3	Al Hidd	0 – 0	Al Shorta	Riffa, Bahrain
15:30 GMT	Mohammad Al Daoud (yellow card) 43'			Stadium: Bahrain National Stadium; Attendance: 300; Referee: Fahad Al-Mirdasi

2 April 2014 4	Al Shorta	0 – 0	Al Hidd	Al Wakrah, Qatar
15:00 GMT	Mahdi Karim (yellow card) 15'; Hamdi Al Masri (yellow card) 42'; Amjad Kalaf (red card) 45+3'; Mohammed Gassid (yellow card) 81'		Sayed Mohammed Adnan (yellow card) 17'	Stadium: Saoud bin Abdulrahman Stadium; Attendance: 100; Referee: Adham Makhadmeh

8 April 2014 5	Al Qadsia	3 – 0	Al Shorta	Kuwait City, Kuwait
16:50 GMT	Omar Al Soma 3', 50', 74', (yellow card) 90+2'; Khalid El Ebrahim (red card) 11'; Ahmad Al Dhefiri (yellow card) 48'; Ibrahima Keita (yellow card) 86'		Ammar Abdul-Hussein Al-Asadi (yellow card) 11'; Hussein Abdul-Wahed (yellow card) 68'	Stadium: Al-Sadaqua Walsalam Stadium; Attendance: 500; Referee: Timur Faizullin

22 April 2014 6	Al Shorta	0 – 0	Al Wahda	Al Wakrah, Qatar
15:30 GMT	Hamdi Al Masri (red card) 90'			Stadium: Saoud bin Abdulrahman Stadium; Referee: Mukhtar Al Yarimi

Last updated: 15 May 2014
Source: Al Shorta website

== Top goalscorers ==
=== Iraqi Premier League ===
Position	Nation	Squad Number	Name	Goals	Assists
FW	(Iraq)	9	Mustafa Karim	7	1
FW	(Iraq)	14	Amjad Kalaf	4	4
DF	(Iraq)	3	Dhirgham Ismail	4	2
MF	(Iraq)	19	Ahmad Ayad	2	3
DF	(Syria)	4	Hamdi Al Masri	2	0
FW	(Iraq)	7	Sherko Karim	2	0
MF	(Iraq)	18	Mahdi Karim	2	0
FW	(Brazil)	30	Cristiano	2	0
DF	(Iraq)	2	Waleed Salem	1	2
MF	(Iraq)	15	Nashat Akram	1	1
FW	(Iraq)	27	Karrar Hameed	1	0
DF	(Iraq)	33	Ali Bahjat	1	0
MF	(Iraq)	10	Mahdi Kamel	0	4
FW	(Iraq)	17	Ammar Abdul-Hussein	0	1

=== AFC Cup ===
Position	Nation	Squad Number	Name	Goals	Assists
FW	(Iraq)	14	Amjad Kalaf	2	0
MF	(Iraq)	18	Mahdi Karim	1	0
MF	(Iraq)	5	Hussein Abdul-Wahed	0	1
