= 2009–10 Al-Shorta SC season =

Al Shorta
Iraqi Premier League season
- President: (Iraq) Raad Hammoudi
- Manager: (Iraq) Rahim Hameed (until 27 June) (Iraq) Hakim Shaker (from 27 June onwards)
- Ground: Al Shorta Stadium
- Iraqi Premier League: 6th
- Top goalscorer: League: Hussein Karim (21); All: Hussein Karim (21)
Home colours	Away colours

In the 2009-10 season, Al Shorta competed in the Iraqi Premier League. They qualified to the elite stage, and were very close to reaching the semi-finals. They were 2-0 up to Al Najaf knowing that a win could qualify them, but they drew the game 2-2 and Al Talaba qualified one point ahead of them.

== Squad ==
Note: Flags indicate national team as defined under FIFA eligibility rules; some limited exceptions apply. Players may hold more than one non-FIFA nationality.

No.	Pos.	Nation	Player
1	GK	IRQ	Wissam Gassid
2	DF	IRQ	Samal Saeed (vice-captain)
3	DF	IRQ	Raad Magtoof
4	DF	IRQ	Ahmed Kadhim Assad (captain)
5	DF	IRQ	Saad Attiya
6	DF	IRQ	Ous Ibrahim
7	MF	IRQ	Emad Khalaf
8	MF	IRQ	Ahmed Khalaf
9	FW	IRQ	Younis Shakor
10	FW	IRQ	Bashar Saad
11	FW	IRQ	Hussein Karim
12	MF	IRQ	Mustafa Mohammed
13	DF	IRQ	Ayad Sadir
14	FW	IRQ	Amjad Kalaf

No.	Pos.	Nation	Player
15	MF	IRQ	Khaldoun Ibrahim
16	MF	IRQ	Muhammed Eskander
17	FW	IRQ	Omar Kadhim
18	MF	IRQ	Ali Zwayed
19	DF	IRQ	Manhal Abbas
20	DF	IRQ	Ali Kareem
21	FW	IRQ	Asaad Abdul-Nabi
22	GK	IRQ	Luay Khalil
28	DF	IRQ	Salah Hilal
35	MF	IRQ	Ahmad Fadhel
50	GK	IRQ	Akram Sabih
66	MF	IRQ	Wissam Kadhim
89	FW	IRQ	Ali Saad
—	GK	IRQ	Hussein Shallal

== Kit ==
Period	Home colours	Away colours
December 2009 – April 2010	Uhlsport	Uhlsport
May 2010 – June 2010	Adidas	Adidas
June 2010 – August 2010	Uhlsport	Adidas

== Transfers ==
=== In ===
Date	Pos.	Name	From	Fee
August 2009	MF	(Iraq) Khaldoun Ibrahim	(Iraq) Arbil FC	-
August 2009	DF	(Iraq) Ayad Sadir	(Iraq) Najaf FC	-
September 2009	FW	(Iraq) Omar Kadhim	(Iraq) Al Zawraa	-
September 2009	DF	(Iraq) Samal Saeed	(Iraq) Arbil FC	-
September 2009	DF	(Iraq) Saad Attiya	(Iraq) Arbil FC	-
September 2009	DF	(Iraq) Ahmed Kadhim Assad	(Iran) PAS Hamedan F.C.	-
September 2009	FW	(Iraq) Asaad Abdul-Nabi	(Iraq) Baghdad FC	-
September 2009	DF	(Iraq) Wissam Kadhim	(Iraq) Duhok FC	-
September 2009	DF	(Iraq) Ous Ibrahim	(Iraq) Al Zawraa	-
September 2009	DF	(Iraq) Saad Attiya	(Iraq) Arbil FC	-
September 2009	MF	(Iraq) Mustafa Mohammed	(Iraq) Samarra FC	-
September 2009	GK	(Iraq) Akram Sabih	(Iraq) Salahaddin FC	-
September 2009	MF	(Iraq) Ahmed Khalaf	(Iraq) Salahaddin FC	-
September 2009	DF	(Iraq) Manhal Abbas	(Iraq) Salahaddin FC	-
September 2009	FW	(Iraq) Younis Shakor	(Iraq) Pires FC	-
September 2009	MF	(Iraq) Emad Khalaf	(Iraq) Pires FC	-
September 2009	DF	(Iraq) Raad Magtoof	(Iraq) Al Sinaa	-
October 2009	GK	(Iraq) Wissam Gassid	(Iraq) Al Quwa Al Jawiya	-
October 2009	DF	(Iraq) Ali Kareem	(Iraq) Samawa FC	-
December 2009	FW	(Iraq) Hussein Karim	(Iraq) Arbil FC	-
May 2010	GK	(Iraq) Hussein Shallal	(Iraq) Pires FC	-

=== Out ===
Date	Pos.	Name	To	Fee
July 2009	DF	(Iraq) Waleed Khalid	(Iraq) Baghdad FC	-
July 2009	FW	(Iraq) Ameer Sabah	(Iraq) Baghdad FC	-
September 2009	DF	(Iraq) Kassim Zidan	(Iraq) Al Zawraa	-
September 2009	FW	(Iraq) Ali Saad	(Iraq) Najaf FC	-
October 2009	FW	(Iraq) Mustafa Jawda	(Iraq) Karbala FC	-

== Matches ==
=== Iraqi Premier League ===
==== First Stage (South Group) ====
31 December 2009 1	Al Shorta	0 – 0	Al-Hedood	Baghdad
11:30 GMT				Stadium: Al Shorta Stadium

6 January 2010 2	Al Karkh	2 – 2	Al Shorta	Baghdad
11:30 GMT	Saad Abdul-Amir 45'; Mohannad Abdul-Raheem 82'		Hussein Karim 26', 90'	Stadium: Al Karkh Stadium

9 January 2010 3	Al Shorta	2 – 2	Al Hassanin	Baghdad
11:30 GMT	Bashar Saad 69'; Hussein Karim 71'		Hassan Jabbar 18', 45'	Stadium: Al Shorta Stadium

15 January 2010 4	Karbala FC	1 – 0	Al Shorta	Karbalaa
11:00 GMT	Mohammed Hadi 78'			Stadium: Karbala Stadium

20 January 2010 5	Al Shorta	1 – 0	Najaf FC	Baghdad
11:30 GMT	Hussein Karim 90+5'			Stadium: Al Shorta Stadium

23 January 2010 6	Al Etisalat	1 – 2	Al Shorta	Baghdad
11:30 GMT	Aqeel Mutaab 58'		Amjad Kalaf (penalty missed) 10'; Khaldoun Ibrahim 26'; Bashar Saad 80'	Stadium: Al Zawraa Stadium

10 February 2010 7	Al Shorta	2 – 0	Maysan FC	Baghdad
11:30 GMT	Hussein Karim 44'; Younis Shakor 89'			Stadium: Al Shorta Stadium

13 February 2010 8	Al Shorta	0 – 0	Naft Maysan	Baghdad
11:30 GMT				Stadium: Al Shorta Stadium

20 February 2010 9	Al Sinaa	0 – 2	Al Shorta	Baghdad
11:30 GMT			Younis Shakor 40'; Hussein Karim 82'	Stadium: Al Sinaa Stadium

24 February 2010 10	Al Shorta	1 – 0	Kufa FC	Baghdad
11:30 GMT	Younis Shakor 34'			Stadium: Al Shorta Stadium

27 February 2010 11	Al Naft	1 – 3	Al Shorta	Baghdad
12:00 GMT	Ali Oudah 6'		Younis Shakor 30', 71'; Hussein Karim 52'	Stadium: Al Naft Stadium

16 March 2010 12	Samawa FC	0 – 3 (w/o)	Al Shorta	Samawah
12:00 GMT				Stadium: As Samawah Stadium
Note: Al Shorta were awarded a 3–0 victory after Samawa FC failed to turn up for the game.

21 March 2010 13	Al Shorta	1 – 0	Nassiriya FC	Baghdad
12:30 GMT	Amjad Kalaf 43'			Stadium: Al Shorta Stadium

29 March 2010 14	Al Shorta	2 – 2	Naft Al Janoob	Baghdad
12:30 GMT	Khaldoun Ibrahim 64'; Hussein Karim 88'		Ahmed Hassan 17'; Alaa Nayrouz 62' (pen.)	Stadium: Al Shorta Stadium

4 April 2010 15	Al Talaba	2 – 2	Al Shorta	Baghdad
13:00 GMT	Abdul-Salam Abboud 73', 81'		Bashar Saad 10'; Samal Saeed 71'	Stadium: Al Karkh Stadium

8 April 2010 16	Diwaniya FC	3 – 5	Al Shorta	Al Diwaniyah
12:00 GMT	Ali Mahmoud 10'; Ahmed Shershab 38'; Qasim Mohammed 62'		Saad Attiya 16'; Hussein Karim 28', 40'; Younis Shakor 34'; Amjad Kalaf 50'	Stadium: Al-Diwaniya Stadium

14 April 2010 17	Al Shorta	1 – 1	Al Minaa	Baghdad
12:30 GMT	Hussein Karim 47'		Sultan Jassim 76'	Stadium: Al Shorta Stadium

1 May 2010 18	Al-Hedood	0 – 0	Al Shorta	Baghdad
13:00 GMT				Stadium: Al Shorta Stadium

5 May 2010 19	Al Shorta	0 – 1	Al Karkh	Baghdad
13:00 GMT			Salam Qasim 56'	Stadium: Al Shorta Stadium

8 May 2010 20	Al Hassanin	0 – 1	Al Shorta	Baghdad
13:00 GMT			Ali Zwayed 49'	Stadium: Al Naft Stadium

13 May 2010 21	Al Shorta	5 – 2	Karbala FC	Baghdad
13:00 GMT	Ahmad Fadhel 13'; Younis Shakor 16', 63'; Hussein Karim (penalty missed) 21', 21'; Khaldoun Ibrahim 51'		Maitham Hamza 34'; Ahmed Jassim 66'	Stadium: Al Shorta Stadium

17 May 2010 22	Najaf FC	2 – 0	Al Shorta	Najaf
13:00 GMT	Hatim Sahib 26'; Haider Obeid 65'			Stadium: An Najaf Stadium

21 May 2010 23	Al Shorta	2 – 0	Al Etisalat	Baghdad
13:00 GMT	Younis Shakor 21'; Hussein Karim 57'			Stadium: Al Shorta Stadium

26 May 2010 24	Maysan FC	0 – 1	Al Shorta	Maysan
13:30 GMT			Hussein Karim 82'	Stadium: Maysan Stadium

31 May 2010 25	Naft Maysan	2 – 0	Al Shorta	Maysan
13:30 GMT	Ali Abed Dhiab 36'; Aqeel Mohammed 64'			Stadium: Maysan Stadium

7 June 2010 26	Al Shorta	2 – 2	Al Sinaa	Baghdad
13:30 GMT	Younis Shakor 25'; Ali Zwayed 73'		Ali Kadhim 22'; Bassam Qabel 70'	Stadium: Al Shorta Stadium

10 June 2010 27	Kufa FC	1 – 1	Al Shorta	Kufa
13:30 GMT	Wael Abdul-Hussein 65'		Ali Zwayed 9'	Stadium: Al Kufa Stadium

14 June 2010 28	Al Shorta	2 – 1	Al Naft	Baghdad
13:30 GMT	Amjad Kalaf 88', 90+4'		Ali Oudah 70'	Stadium: Al Shorta Stadium

18 June 2010 29	Al Shorta	1 – 1	Samawa FC	Baghdad
14:00 GMT	Hussein Karim 65'		Karrar Abbas 32'	Stadium: Al Shorta Stadium

21 June 2010 30	Nassiriya FC	0 – 1	Al Shorta	Nasiriyah
14:00 GMT			Hussein Karim 42'	Stadium: An Nasiriyah Stadium

26 June 2010 31	Naft Al Janoob	2 – 0	Al Shorta	Nasiriyah
14:00 GMT	Ali Jawad 1', 83'			Stadium: An Nasiriyah Stadium

30 June 2010 32	Al Shorta	2 – 1	Al Talaba	Baghdad
14:00 GMT	Younis Shakor 53'; Hussein Karim 72'		Thamer Fouad 43'	Stadium: Al Shorta Stadium

3 July 2010 33	Al Shorta	2 – 1	Diwaniya FC	Baghdad
14:00 GMT	Hussein Karim 4'; Younis Shakor 16'		Ali Mahmoud 56'	Stadium: Al Shorta Stadium

6 July 2010 34	Al Minaa	2 – 0	Al Shorta	Basra
14:00 GMT	Sajjad Abdul-Karim 26' (pen.); Mohammed Jaber 38'			Stadium: Al Mina'a Stadium

==== Elite Stage (Group 2) ====
16 July 2010 1	Arbil FC	0 – 1	Al Shorta	Arbil
15:30 GMT			Younis Shakor 56'	Stadium: Franso Hariri Stadium

3 August 2010 2	Al Shorta	1 – 1	Al Kahraba	Baghdad
14:00 GMT	Hussein Karim 9' (pen.)		Alaa Kalaf 30'	Stadium: Al Shorta Stadium

7 August 2010 3	Al Shorta	1 – 0	Najaf FC	Baghdad
14:00 GMT	Hussein Karim 27'			Stadium: Al Shorta Stadium

11 August 2010 4	Al Shorta	0 – 2	Arbil FC	Baghdad
13:30 GMT			Ahmad Salah Alwan 17'; Mahdi Karim 68'	Stadium: Al Shorta Stadium

15 August 2010 5	Al Kahraba	0 – 0	Al Shorta	Baghdad
13:30 GMT				Stadium: Al Zawraa Stadium

23 August 2010 6	Najaf FC	2 – 2	Al Shorta	Najaf
13:30 GMT	Hatim Sahib 39'; Faris Hassoun 45'		Amjad Kalaf 8'; Hussein Karim 9'	Stadium: An Najaf Stadium
