= Khaldoun Ibrahim =

Iraqi footballer

Personal information
- Date of birth: 16 June 1987 (age 39)
- Place of birth: Iraq
- Height: 1.75 m (5 ft 9 in)
- Position: Defensive midfielder

Senior career*
Years	Team	Apps	(Gls)
2004–2006	Al-Zawraa		
2006–2007	Mes Kerman		
2007–2009	Erbil		
2009–2010	Al-Shorta		
2010–2011	Naft Tehran		
2011–2012	Al-Zawraa		
2012–2013	Amanat Baghdad		
2013–2014	Al-Talaba		
2014–2015	Al-Zawraa		
2015	Al-Karkh		
2015–2016	Zakho FC		
2016–2017	Naft Al-Wasat		
2017–2020	Amanat Baghdad		
2020–2021	Naft Al-Wasat		

International career
2007–2008	Iraq U23	3	(0)
2007–2013	Iraq	34	(0)
Medal record
Men's football
Representing Iraq
AFC Asian Cup
Winner	2007 Indonesia/Malaysia/ Thailand/Vietnam
- * Club domestic league appearances and goals

Khaldoun Ibrahim (Arabic: خلدون إبراهيم محمد البو محمد; born 16 June 1987) is an Iraqi former footballer who played as a defensive midfielder. He made 34 appearances for the Iraq national team. His older brother is Ous Ibrahim, also a national player.

== Honours ==
Erbil SC

- Iraqi Premier League: 2008–09

Iraq

- AFC Asian Cup: 2007
- WAFF Championship runner-up: 2012
- Arabian Gulf Cup runner-up: 2013
