= Ali Salah Hashim =

Iraqi footballer

Ali Salah
Personal information
- Full name: Ali Salah Hashim
- Date of birth: 16 February 1987 (age 39)
- Place of birth: Baghdad, Iraq
- Height: 1.89 m (6 ft 2 in)
- Position: Striker

Youth career
- 2003–2005: Al-Shorta

Senior career*
Years	Team	Apps	(Gls)
2005–2007	Al-Shorta		(5)
2007–2010	Al-Hussein	18	(12)
2008	→ Al-Faisaly (loan)	9	(2)
2009	→ Al-Wahda (loan)	12	(3)
2009	→ Dohuk (loan)	0	(0)
2010	→ Safa Beirut (loan)	12	(7)
2010–2012	Al-Wahda	24	(13)
2012	→ Al-Wehdat (loan)	4	(1)
2012–2013	Al-Naft	7	(3)
2013–2015	Al-Talaba	22	(14)
2015	Al-Quwa Al-Jawiya		
2015–2016	Al-Shorta		(2)
2016–2017	Naft Al-Janoob SC		
2017	Sanat Naft	2	(0)
2017–2018	Al-Talaba		
2018–2021	Naft Maysan		

International career
2007	Iraq U23	3	(1)
2008–2012	Iraq	7	(0)
- * Club domestic league appearances and goals

Ali Salah Hashim (Arabic: عَلِيّ صَلَاح هَاشِم; born February 16, 1987) is an Iraqi football striker who last played for Naft Maysan.

== Honours ==
=== International ===
Iraq

- Arab Nations Cup Bronze medallist: 2012

=== Individual ===
- Jordan League second top-goalscorer: 2007–08
- Jordan League Best Foreign player: 2007–08
- Iraqi Premier League top-goalscorer: 2013–14
