= Wissam Gassid =

Iraqi footballer

Wissam Kassid
Personal information
- Full name: Wissam Kassid Kadhim Al-Jaberi
- Date of birth: 13 February 1981 (age 45)
- Place of birth: Baghdad, Iraq
- Height: 1.87 m (6 ft 1 1/2 in)
- Position: Goalkeeper

Team information
- Current team: Al-Kahrabaa FC (goalkeeping coach)

Senior career*
Years	Team	Apps	(Gls)
2001–2004	Al-Karkh		
2004–2005	Al-Zawraa		
2005–2009	Al-Quwa Al-Jawiya		
2009–2010	Al-Shorta		
2010–2014	Al-Quwa Al-Jawiya		
2014–2017	Al-Kahraba		

International career^{‡}
2005	Iraq	3	(0)

Managerial career
- 2018–2020: Al-Quwa Al-Jawiya (Reserves Goalkeep. coach)
- 2020–2021: Al-Hudood (Goalkeeping coach)
- 2021–: Al-Kahrabaa FC (Goalkeeping coach)
- * Club domestic league appearances and goals as of N/A ‡ National team caps and goals as of 12 July 2013

Wissam Gassid Kadhim Al-Jaberi (Arabic: وِسَام كَاصِد كَاظِم الْجَابِرِيّ; born 13 February 1981), known as Wissam Gassid, is an Iraqi former professional football goalkeeper. He is currently the goalkeeping coach of Al-Kahrabaa FC.

Wissam's younger brother, Mohammed, is also a goalkeeper, and plays for Al-Zawraa in Iraq.

== Honours ==
=== Country ===
- 2002 WAFF Cup: Champions
- 2005 West Asian Games: Gold medal
- 2013 CISM World Football Trophy: Champions
