= Lorival Santos =

Brazilian footballer (born 1959)

Personal information
- Full name: Lorival Alves dos Santos
- Date of birth: 7 October 1959 (age 67)
- Place of birth: São Paulo, Brazil
- Position: Midfielder

Senior career*
Years	Team	Apps	(Gls)
1975	Guapira		
1976	Paulista		
1977	América Mineiro		

Managerial career
- 1985: Banespa U20
- 1986–1987: Banespa
- 1989: Banespa U17
- 1994: Juventus-SP U20
- 1996: Juventus-SP
- 1997–1999: Juventus-SP
- 1999: Juventus-SP U20
- 2000: Grêmio Barueri
- 2000: Corinthians B
- 2003: Taubaté
- 2004: ADAP
- 2005: Grêmio Barueri
- 2006: ADAP
- 2006: São Bernardo
- 2007: Cascavel
- 2007–2008: Roma Apucarana
- 2008–2009: CSA
- 2009: Central
- 2010: Canoas
- 2010–2011: Corinthians Alagoano
- 2011: Coruripe
- 2012: São José
- 2012–2013: CSA
- 2013: Treze
- 2013–2014: Al-Shorta
- 2015: Murici
- 2015: Coruripe
- 2016: CSE
- 2017: Santa Cruz de Natal
- 2019: Cascavel
- 2020–2021: ASA
- 2022: UNIRB
- * Club domestic league appearances and goals

Lorival Alves dos Santos (born 7 October 1959) is a Brazilian professional football coach and former player who most recently managed Brazilian club UNIRB FC.

== Playing career ==
Santos began his playing career as a midfielder for Guapira. He went on to play for Paulista and América-MG.

== Coaching career ==
Santos began his coaching career with Banespa's youth team in 1985 and later went on to coach their first team where he won the Troféu Cidade de São Paulo which was his first title as a manager. His second trophy came in 2000 when he led Corinthians Paulista B to the Copa Chivas title. He won his third honour in 2004, leading ADAP to the Campeonato do Interior Paranaense Série Ouro title. He coached Brazilian teams in various professional leagues in the late 2000s and early 2010s including coaching ADAP in the 2005 Campeonato Paranaense, Cascavel in the 2007 Campeonato Paranaense, Roma Apucarana in the 2008 Copa do Brasil, Central in the 2009 Campeonato Pernambucano, Canoas in the 2010 Campeonato Gaúcho and Treze in the 2013 Campeonato Paraibano.

After 28 years of coaching in Brazil, Santos took up a new job as he was appointed manager of Iraqi Premier League champions Al-Shorta. He coached them through their 2014 AFC Champions League qualifying campaign and their 2014 AFC Cup group stage campaign but the club was eliminated from both tournaments. Santos successfully led Al-Shorta to first place in the 2013–14 Iraqi Premier League with 43 points from 21 matches, although the season was ended prematurely due to the war situation in the country. He received a Certificate of Merit for achieving an unprecedented feat of most consecutive wins against the club's rival teams, as his team achieved seven wins from seven matches against Al-Zawraa, Duhok, Erbil, Al-Talaba, Al-Quwa Al-Jawiya and Amanat Baghdad until the streak was ended with a 2–2 draw against Duhok. He was the coach who gave Mohanad Ali his debut in the Baghdad Derby against Al-Talaba on 26 March 2014 which made Mohanad the youngest player in Iraqi Premier League history at only 13 years old.

He then returned to coaching in Brazil and managed Cascavel in their first five 2019 Campeonato Paranaense matches, achieving two wins and three losses, before taking over at ASA de Arapiraca where he won the Copa Alagoas.

== Honours ==
=== Manager ===
Banespa

- Troféu Cidade de São Paulo: 1989

Corinthians B

- Copa Chivas: 2000

ADAP

- Campeonato do Interior Paranaense Série Ouro: 2004

ASA

- Copa Alagoas: 2021

=== Individual ===
- Copa Chivas Best Manager: 2000
- Iraqi Premier League Certificate of Merit: 2014
