= Karim Salman =

Iraqi footballer (1965–2020)

Personal information
- Full name: Abdul-Karim Salman Jabbar
- Date of birth: 4 March 1965
- Place of birth: Iraq
- Date of death: 2 December 2020 (aged 55)
- Place of death: Baghdad, Iraq
- Position: Defender

Senior career*
| Years | Team | Apps | (Gls) |
- Al-Talaba SC
- Al-Rasheed SC
- Al-Talaba SC

International career
| 1988–1994 | Iraq | | |

Managerial career
- 2012: Al-Talaba
- 2013–2015: Iraq (Assist.)
- 2015–2016: Al-Talaba (Assist.)
- 2016–2017: Iraq (Assist.)
- 2017–2020: Al-Karkh
- * Club domestic league appearances and goals

Karim Salman (4 March 1965 – 2 December 2020) was an Iraqi football defender.

He played for Iraq in the 1988 Summer Olympics and played for the national team between 1988 and 1993.

Salman died from COVID-19 on 2 December 2020, aged 55, during the COVID-19 pandemic in Iraq.

== Managerial statistics ==
As of match played 2 December 2020

Managerial record by team and tenure
| Team | From | To | Record | | | | | Ref. |
| Team | From | To | P | W | D | L | Win % | Ref. |
|---|---|---|---|---|---|---|---|---|
| Al-Talaba | 5 November 2012 | 10 December 2012 | 5 | 1 | 1 | 3 | 20.0 | |
| Al-Karkh | 31 August 2017 | 2 December 2020 | 103 | 48 | 28 | 27 | 46.6 | |
| Total | | | 108 | 49 | 29 | 30 | 45.4 | — |
