= 2024 Iraq FA Cup final =

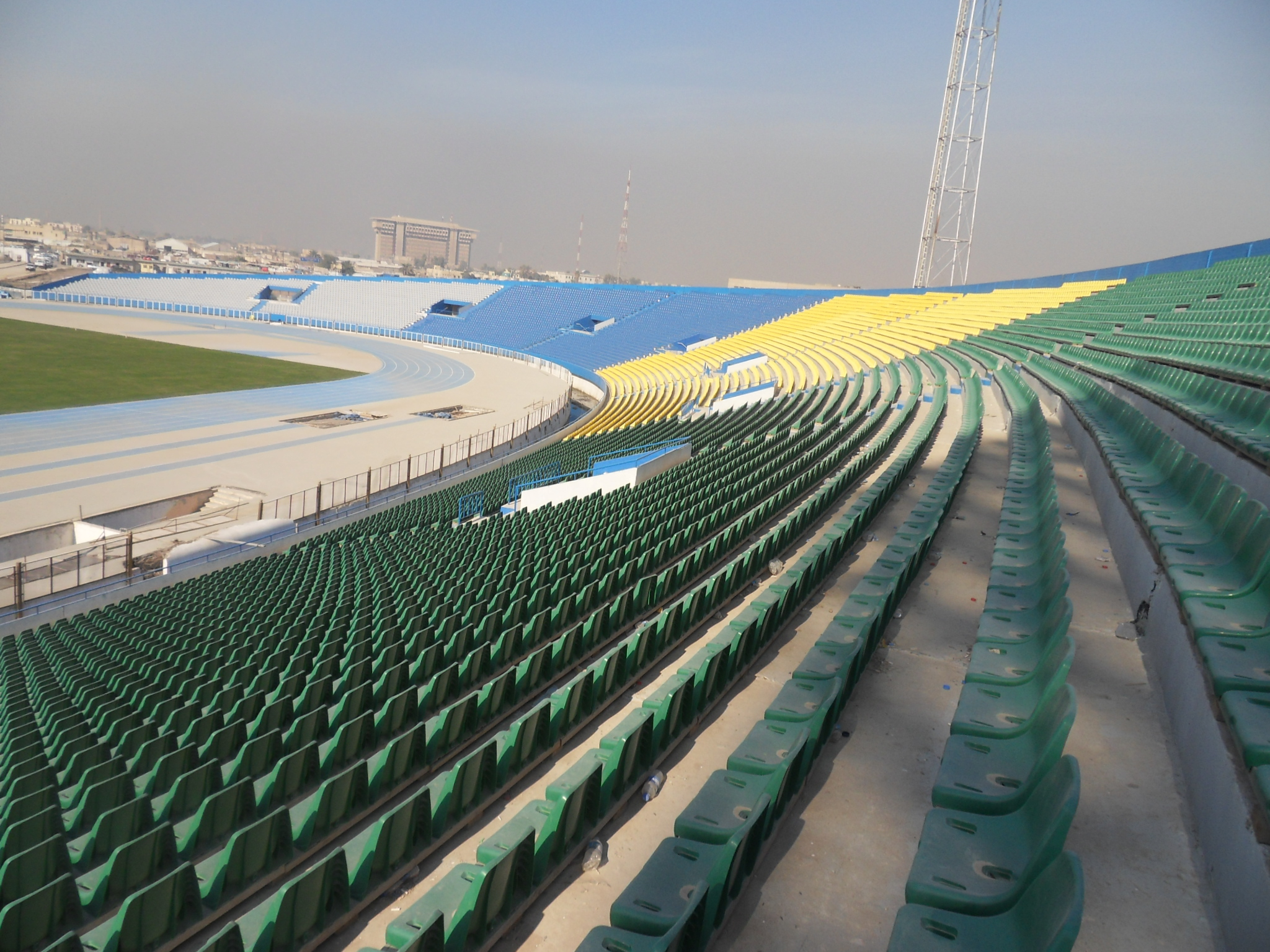
- The match took place at Al-Shaab Stadium
- Event: 2023–24 Iraq FA Cup
Al-Shorta	Al-Quwa Al-Jawiya
1	0
- Date: 10 July 2024
- Venue: Al-Shaab Stadium, Baghdad
- Referee: Ilgiz Tantashev (Uzbekistan)

The 2024 Iraq FA Cup final was the 31st final of the Iraq FA Cup as a club competition. The match was contested between Al-Shorta and Al-Quwa Al-Jawiya, at Al-Shaab Stadium in Baghdad. It was played on 10 July 2024 to be the final match of the competition. Al-Quwa Al-Jawiya made their tenth appearance in the Iraq FA Cup final while Al-Shorta made their sixth appearance.

Al-Shorta won the match 1–0 with a goal from Lucas Santos de Souza to earn their first Iraq FA Cup title.

== Route to the final ==
Note: In all results below, the score of the finalist is given first (H: home; A: away; N: neutral).

Al-Shorta		Round	Al-Quwa Al-Jawiya	
Opponent	Result	2023–24 Iraq FA Cup	Opponent	Result
Zakho	0–0 (4–3 p.) (A)	Round of 16	Al-Najaf	0–0 (8–7 p.) (A)
Al-Minaa	2–0 (A)	Quarter-finals	Naft Maysan	3–0 (H)
Al-Naft	1–0 (N)	Semi-finals	Al-Zawraa	1–0 (N)

== Match ==
=== Details ===
10 July 2024
20:00 UTC+03:00

Al-Shorta	1–0	Al-Quwa Al-Jawiya
Santos 59'

Al-Shaab Stadium, Baghdad
Referee: Ilgiz Tantashev (Uzbekistan)

Al-Shorta	Al-Quwa Al-Jawiya

GK	1	(Iraq) Ahmed Basil (c)
RB	27	(Iraq) Ameer Sabah
CB	24	(Iraq) Faisal Jassim
CB	36	(Cameroon) Salomon Banga
LB	15	(Iraq) Ahmed Yahya		(substituted off) 81'
CM	25	(Iraq) Abdul-Razzaq Qasim
CM	30	(Syria) Fahd Al-Youssef
RM	11	(Iraq) Bassam Shakir		(substituted off) 90+1'
AM	7	(Syria) Mahmoud Al-Mawas	(yellow card) 30'	(substituted off) 90+1'
LM	9	(Iraq) Hussein Ali	(yellow card) 51'
CF	28	(Brazil) Lucas Santos		(substituted off) 72'
Substitutions:
GK	22	(Iraq) Mohammed Karim
DF	3	(Iraq) Karrar Amer
DF	4	(Iraq) Munaf Younis		(substituted on) 90+1'
DF	31	(Iraq) Ahmed Zero
MF	6	(Iraq) Sajjad Jassim		(substituted on) 81'
MF	8	(Iraq) Zidane Abdul-Jabbar
MF	16	(Iraq) Mohammed Mezher
MF	37	(Guinea) Ousmane Coumbassa		(substituted on) 90+1'
FW	10	(Iraq) Alaa Abdul-Zahra	(yellow card) 85' (yellow-red card) 87'	(substituted on) 72'
Manager:
(Egypt) Moamen Soliman

GK	20	(Iraq) Mohammed Hameed
RB	2	(Tunisia) Ghaith Maaroufi		(substituted off) 79'
CB	4	(Iraq) Saad Natiq	(yellow card) 81'
CB	48	(Iraq) Ruslan Hanoon
LB	30	(Iraq) Mustafa Waleed		(substituted off) 61'
CM	5	(Iraq) Youssef Fawzi		(substituted off) 61'
CM	16	(Iraq) Shihab Razzaq
CM	25	(Iraq) Saad Abdul-Amir		(substituted off) 79'
RM	8	(Iraq) Ibrahim Bayesh (c)
LM	10	(Iraq) Ali Jasim
CF	9	(Iraq) Aymen Hussein
Substitutions:
GK	12	(Iraq) Mohammed Shakir
DF	6	(Iraq) Sameh Saeed
DF	17	(Iraq) Mustafa Saadoun		(substituted on) 61'
DF	24	(Iraq) Hassan Raed		(substituted on) 79'
DF	29	(Bolivia) Pablo Pedraza
DF	44	(Iraq) Hammoud Mishaan
MF	11	(Iraq) Humam Tariq		(substituted on) 79'
FW	14	(Iraq) Hussein Jabbar		(substituted on) 61' (substituted off) 69'
FW	77	(Yemen) Ahmed Al-Sarori		(substituted on) 69'
Manager:
(Iraq) Razzaq Farhan

Assistant referees:
Andrey Tsapenko (Uzbekistan)
Timur Gaynullin (Uzbekistan)
Fourth official:
Ahmed Kadhim (Iraq)
Video assistant referee:
Akhrol Riskullayev (Uzbekistan)

Match rules

- 90 minutes.
- Penalty shoot-out if scores still level.
- Nine named substitutes, of which up to five may be used.
