= Cristiano (footballer, born May 1987) =

Brazilian footballer

Personal information
- Full name: Cristiano da Silva Santos
- Date of birth: May 16, 1987 (age 39)
- Place of birth: Pedro Leopoldo-MG, Brazil
- Height: 1.78 m (5 ft 10 in)
- Position: Striker

Youth career
- 2005: Atlético Mineiro

Senior career*
Years	Team	Apps	(Gls)
2006–2012	Atlético Mineiro	1	(0)
2008	→ CRB (loan)		
2008	→ Uberlândia (loan)		
2008	→ Araxá (loan)		
2009	→ Inter de Limeira (loan)		
2010	→ Náutico (loan)	18	(3)
2011	→ Villa Nova (loan)		
2011	→ Mogi Mirim (loan)		
2011	→ Ipatinga (loan)	10	(4)
2012	→ Comercial-SP (loan)		
2012	Joinville		
2012	Chapecoense	13	(1)
2013	Rio Branco-SP		
2013	Betim		
2013–2014	Al-Shorta		(2)
2015	Caldense	15	(5)
2015	América Mineiro	15	(2)
2016	Linense	8	(0)
2017	Caldense	7	(1)
2017–2018	Cuiabá	6	(0)
2018	Chiangrai United		
2018	→ Sisaket (loan)	23	(8)
2019	Votuporanguense	11	(2)
2019	Samut Sakhon		
2020–2022	Ypranga		
2022–2023	América de Natal		
2023	São Bento		
2023–2024	Aymorés		
2025	Bishkek City	13	(3)
- * Club domestic league appearances and goals

Cristiano da Silva Santos or simply Cristiano (born May 16, 1987 in Pedro Leopoldo-MG), is a Brazilian former footballer who plays as a striker.

== Contract ==
- CRB (Loan) 2 January 2008 to 30 November 2008
- Atlético Mineiro 18 March 2007 to 18 March 2009
