= Aboubacar Tambadou =

Malian footballer

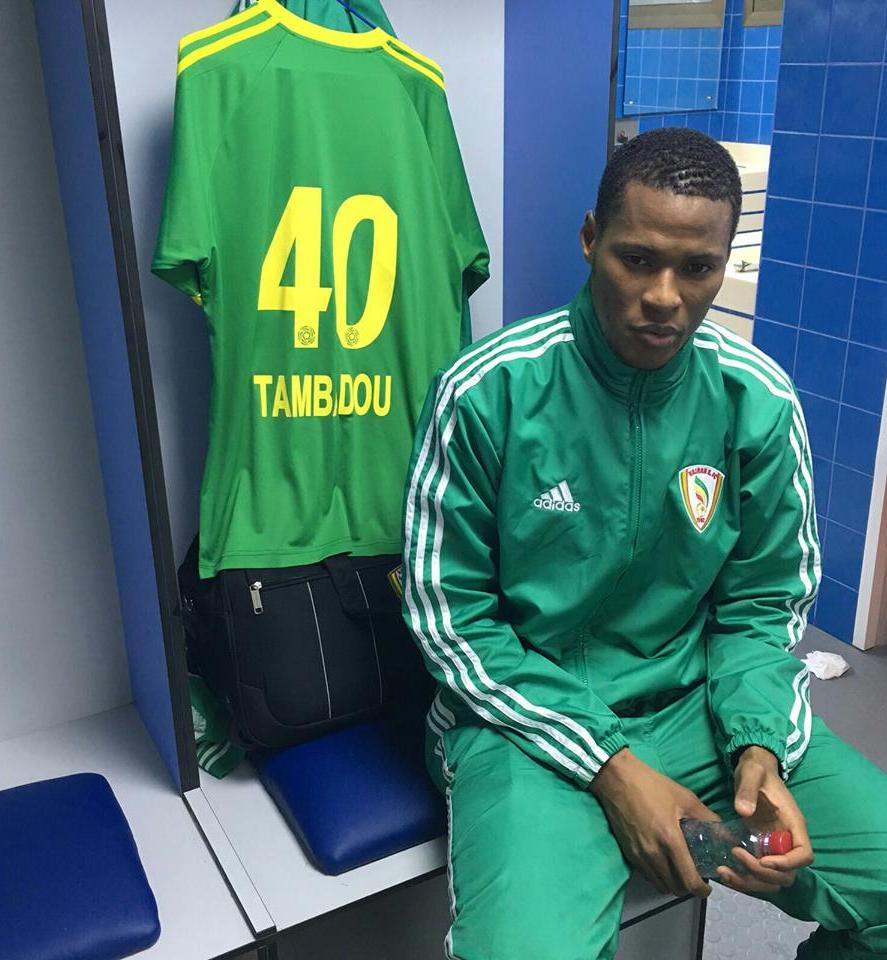
- Tambadou with Najran in 2015

Personal information
- Full name: Aboubacar Tambadou
- Date of birth: 16 January 1987 (age 39)
- Place of birth: Bamako, Mali
- Height: 1.88 m (6 ft 2 in)
- Positions: Central midfielder; striker

Youth career
- AS Real Bamako

Senior career*
Years	Team	Apps	(Gls)
2004–2007	AS Real Bamako		
2008–2010	Stade Malien		
2009–2010	→ Stade Tunisien (loan)	1	(0)
2010–2015	AS Marsa	62	(6)
2013–2014	→ Al-Karkh SC (loan)		
2015–2016	Najran SC		
2016–2018	Budaiya Club		

International career
2008–	Mali	3	(0)
- * Club domestic league appearances and goals

Aboubacar Tambadou (born 16 January 1987 in Bamako, Mali) is a Malian footballer, who plays in Tunisia for Avenir Sportif de La Marsa.

== Career ==
Tambadou began his career with AS Real Bamako and was signed in January 2008 for League rival Stade Malien. After two successful seasons with Stade Malien he signed in summer 2009 for Stade Tunisien.

== International career ==
He earned his first call-up in 2008 and made his international debut on 27 April 2009 against Equatorial Guinea national football team
