= 2022 Iraq FA Cup final =

- Event: 2021–22 Iraq FA Cup
Al-Karkh	Al-Kahrabaa
2	1
- Date: 16 July 2022
- Venue: Al-Madina Stadium, Baghdad
- Man of the Match: Jafar Obeis (Al-Karkh)
- Referee: Mohanad Qasim

The 2022 Iraq FA Cup final was the 29th final of the Iraq FA Cup as a club competition. The match was contested between Al-Karkh and Al-Kahrabaa, at Al-Madina Stadium in Baghdad. It was played on 16 July 2022 to be the final match of the competition. Al-Karkh made their first appearance in the Iraq FA Cup final while Al-Kahrabaa made their second appearance.

Al-Karkh won the match 2–1 with goals from Jafar Obeis and Hasan Abdulkareem to earn their first Iraq FA Cup title.

== Route to the Final ==
Note: In all results below, the score of the finalist is given first (H: home; A: away; N: neutral).

Al-Karkh		Round	Al-Kahrabaa	
Opponent	Result	2021–22 Iraq FA Cup	Opponent	Result
Al-Minaa	2–1 (A)	Round of 32	Al-Dujail	1–0 (H)
Diyala	2–1 (H)	Round of 16	Newroz	2–0 (A)
Erbil	1–1 (5–3 p.) (H)	Quarter-finals	Amanat Baghdad	0–0 (4–2 p.) (H)
Al-Zawraa	1–0 (N)	Semi-finals	Zakho	2–0 (N)

== Match ==
=== Details ===
16 July 2022
20:00 UTC+03:00

Al-Karkh	2–1	Al-Kahrabaa
Obeis 54'; Abdulkareem 60'		Abdul-Amir 15'

Al-Madina Stadium, Baghdad
Referee: Mohanad Qasim

Al-Karkh	Al-Kahrabaa

GK	1	(Iraq) Abid Salim
RB	23	(Iraq) Karrar Saad	(yellow card) 90+6'
CB	4	(Iraq) Munaf Younis		(substituted off) 83'
CB	53	(Iraq) Taqi Falah	(yellow card) 90+2'	(substituted off) 90+2'
LB	44	(Iraq) Omar Nouri
DM	16	(Iraq) Shihab Razzaq (c)
CM	5	(Iraq) Youssef Fawzi	(yellow card) 80'	(substituted off) 83'
CM	3	(Syria) Kamel Hmeisheh	(yellow card) 37'
RM	11	(Iraq) Omar Abdul-Rahman
LM	10	(Iraq) Hasan Abdulkareem	(yellow card) 76'	(substituted off) 78'
CF	27	(Iraq) Jafar Obeis		(substituted off) 90+2'
Substitutions:
MF	29	(Iraq) Ahmed Salah		(substituted on) 78'
DF	50	(Iraq) Mohammed Abdul-Hussein		(substituted on) 83'
MF	52	(Iraq) Mohammed Maitham		(substituted on) 83'
DF	13	(Iraq) Mustafa Hassan		(substituted on) 90+2'
DF	18	(Iraq) Haidar Majid		(substituted on) 90+2'
Manager:
(Iraq) Ahmed Abdul-Jabar

GK	93	(Iraq) Mohammed Hameed (c)
RB	4	(Iraq) Harith Falah
CB	25	(Iraq) Ali Khaled	(yellow card) 24'
CB	34	(Iraq) Abdullah Abdul-Amir
LB	3	(Iraq) Sajad Khalil
RM	26	(Iraq) Ali Jasim		(substituted off) 60'
CM	19	(Iraq) Mohammed Salam	(red card) (Note: Mohammed Salam received a red card after the final whistle for confronting the referee.)	(substituted off) 72'
CM	6	(Iraq) Hussein Falah
LM	20	(Iraq) Ahmed Mahmoud		(substituted off) 64'
CF	90	(Iraq) Alaa Mhaisen		(substituted off) 64'
CF	9	(Iraq) Muhaimen Salim		(substituted off) 72'
Substitutions:
FW	17	(Iraq) Mohammed Ibrahim	(yellow card) 74'	(substituted on) 60'
DF	5	(Iraq) Saif Hatem		(substituted on) 64'
MF	10	(Iraq) Mustafa Ali		(substituted on) 64'
MF	21	(Iraq) Ivan Khalid		(substituted on) 72'
FW	29	(Iraq) Ameer Ayad		(substituted on) 72'
Manager:
(Iraq) Luay Salah

Man of the Match:
Jafar Obeis (Al-Karkh)

Assistant referees:
Wathik Mdallal Obaid Al-Swaiedi
Ahmed Saleh Mohammed
Fourth official:
Wathik Mohammed Al-Baag

Match rules

- 90 minutes.
- Penalty shoot-out if scores still level.
- Nine named substitutes, of which up to five may be used.
