= 2007–08 Jordan League =

Jordan Premier League
- Season: 2007-2008
- Champions: Al-Wehdat (10th title)
- Relegated: Al Ramtha; Al-Ahli
- AFC Cup: Al-Wehdat; Al-Faisaly
- Matches: 90
- Goals: 267 (2.97 per match)
- Top goalscorer: Mahmoud Shelbaieh (Al-Wehdat-14 goals)

The 2007–2008 Jordan League was the 56th season of Jordan Premier League, the top-flight league for Jordanian association football clubs. The championship was won by Al-Wehdat, while Al Ramtha and Al-Ahli were relegated. A total of 10 teams participated.

== Teams ==
Jordanian League 2007-2008
Club	Location	Stadium	Capacity	Year formed
Al-Faisaly	Amman	Amman International Stadium	17,619	1932
Al-Hussein	Irbid	Al-Hassan Stadium	12,000	1964
Al-Arabi	Irbid	Al-Hassan Stadium	12,000	1947
Al-Jazeera	Amman	Amman International Stadium	17,619	1947
Al-Ramtha	Ar Ramtha	Al-Hassan Stadium	12,000	1966
Shabab Al-Ordon	Amman	King Abdullah Stadium	14,000	2002
Al-Wehdat	Amman	King Abdullah Stadium	14,000	1956
Al-Ahli	Amman	Amman International Stadium	17,619	1944
Al-Baqa'a	Balqa Governorate	Amman International Stadium	17,619	1968
Shabab Al-Hussein	Amman	Amman International Stadium	17,619	

=== Map ===
Location of clubs in Jordan for the 2007-2008 Premier League season

== League standings ==
Pos	Team	Pld	W	D	L	GF	GA	GD	Pts	Relegation
1	Al-Wehdat	18	15	2	1	47	12	+35	47	Champions
2	Al-Faisaly	18	13	3	2	40	16	+24	42	
3	Shabab Al-Ordon	18	7	8	3	27	15	+12	29	
4	Al-Hussein Irbid	18	8	5	5	25	25	0	29	
5	Al-Baqa'a	18	6	7	5	28	23	+5	25	
6	Al-Arabi	18	4	6	8	23	41	−18	18	
7	Al-Jazeera	18	2	10	6	25	27	−2	16	
8	Shabab Al-Hussein	18	4	4	10	21	36	−15	16	
9	Al-Ramtha	18	2	6	10	18	34	−16	12	Relegated
10	Al-Ahli	18	1	5	12	13	38	−25	8	Relegated

Source: RSSSF
