= Sharar Haidar =

Iraqi footballer (1971–2023)

Personal information
- Full name: Sharar Haidar Mohammad Al-Bayati
- Date of birth: 15 August 1971
- Date of death: 22 September 2023 (aged 52)
- Position: Defender

International career
Years	Team	Apps	(Gls)
1989–1992	Iraq		

Sharar Haidar Mohammad Al-Bayati (Arabic: شرار حيدر; 15 August 1971 – 22 September 2023) was an Iraqi football defender, who played for the Iraq national team in the 1989 FIFA World Youth Championship and 1994 FIFA World Cup qualification. He played for the national team between 1989 and 1992. He was appointed Al-Karkh chairman in 2003.

Haidar fled Iraq in 1998 and told the media how the players were tortured after losses on orders by Uday Hussein.

Sharar Haidar died from a heart attack on 22 September 2023, at the age of 52.
