= Sharar Haidar Stadium =

Football stadium in Baghdad, Iraq

Captain Sharar Haidar Stadium
- ملعب الكابتن شرار حيدر
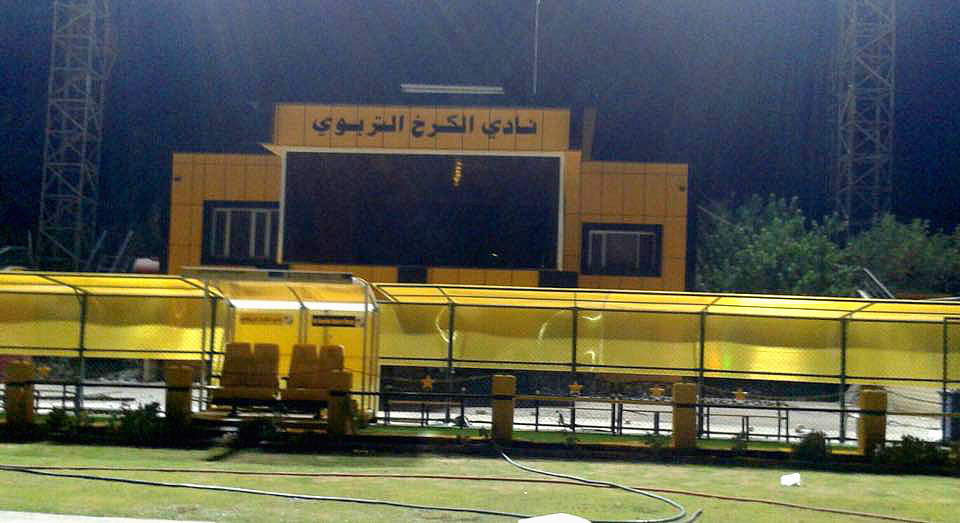
- Interactive map of Captain Sharar Haidar Stadium
- Full name: Captain Sharar Haidar Stadium
- Former names: Al-Mansour Local Administration Stadium, Al-Rasheed Stadium, Al-Karkh Stadium, Al-Saher Ahmed Radhi Stadium
- Location: Baghdad, Iraq
- Coordinates: 33°19′00″N 44°21′54″E
- Owner: Al-Karkh SC
- Capacity: 5,150
- Surface: Grass

Construction
- Renovated: 2004, 2017

Tenant
- Al-Karkh SC

Captain Sharar Haidar Stadium (Arabic: ملعب الكابتن شرار حيدر) is a multi-use stadium in Baghdad, Iraq. It is used mostly for football matches and serves as the home stadium of Al-Karkh SC. The stadium holds 5,150 people.

== Etymology ==
Originally called Al-Mansour Local Administration Stadium, it was renamed Al-Rasheed Stadium when Al-Rasheed SC took over the ground in 1984. It became known as Al-Karkh Stadium after Al-Rasheed was dissolved and Al-Karkh replaced them in the top division in 1990.

In June 2020, following the death of former Iraqi and Al-Rasheed player Ahmed Radhi, the stadium was renamed Al-Saher Ahmed Radhi Stadium.

In January 2026, the stadium was renamed again to Captain Sharar Haidar Stadium. It is named after Al-Karkh's former president Sharar Haidar who died in 2023.

== Gallery ==
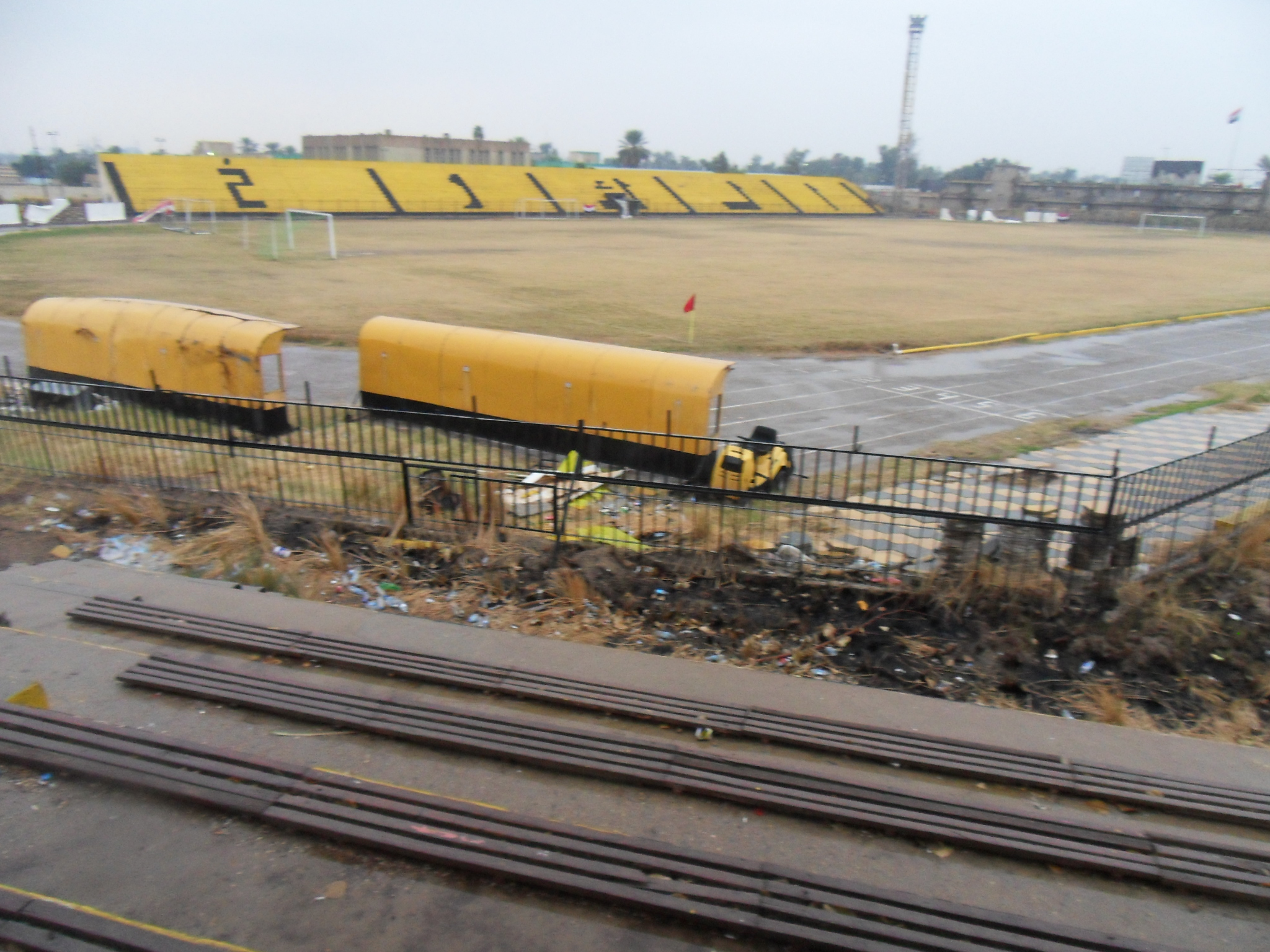
The stadium before its renovation

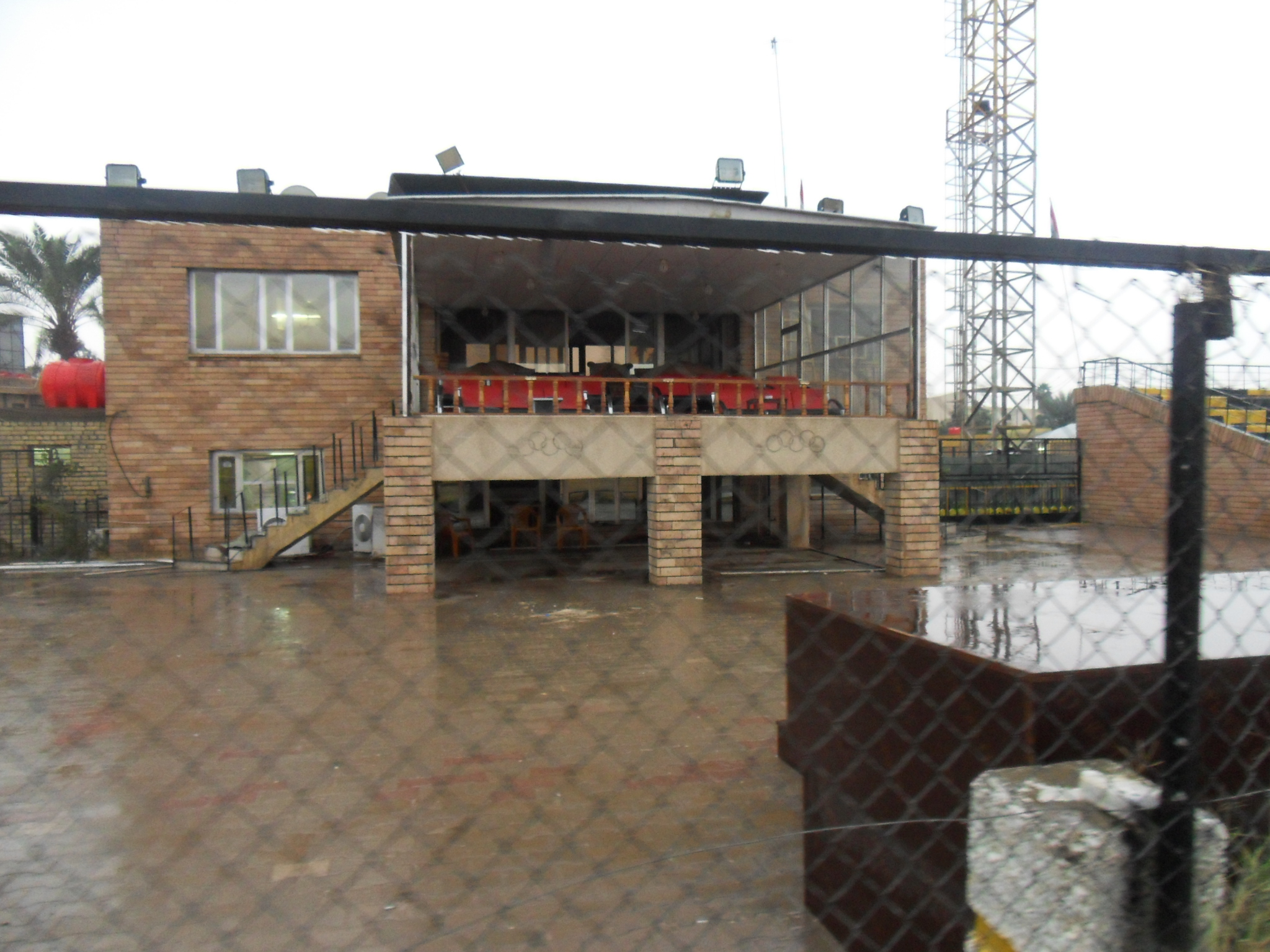
Skybox

== See also ==
- List of football stadiums in Iraq
