= 2013–14 Iraqi Premier League =

Iraqi Premier League
- Season: 2013–14
- Dates: 29 October 2013 – 15 June 2014 (Season ended prematurely)
- Champions: Not awarded
- AFC Cup: Al-Shorta; Erbil
- Matches: 177
- Goals: 400 (2.26 per match)
- Top goalscorer: Ali Salah (14 goals)
- Biggest home win: Al-Shorta 5–0 Duhok (29 November 2013); Al-Quwa Al-Jawiya 5–0 Naft Maysan (4 June 2014)
- Biggest away win: Al-Talaba 1–5 Al-Quwa Al-Jawiya (9 June 2014)
- Highest scoring: Naft Al-Junoob 2–5 Naft Maysan (7 February 2014)
- Longest winning run: 5 games Al-Shorta
- Longest unbeaten run: 13 games Al-Shorta
- Longest winless run: 11 games Al-Najaf
- Longest losing run: 6 games Al-Najaf

The 2013–14 Iraqi Premier League was the 40th season of the competition since its establishment in 1974. The name of the league was changed from Iraqi Elite League to Iraqi Premier League, and the season began on 29 October 2013. The situation in Iraq caused by the war with ISIS began to worsen towards the end of spring 2014, with increased unrest in the country causing travel difficulties and concerns over the feasibility of scheduling the remaining fixtures, particularly with the month of Ramadan approaching.

On 18 June 2014, after the end of round 23 of 30, the Iraq Football Association (IFA) announced in an official statement that it had decided to end the league at its current stage and consider the league table as final, without relegating any teams. First-placed Al-Shorta and second-placed Erbil would not be crowned as champions and runners-up respectively, but would be considered as such only for the purpose of enabling admission into the AFC Cup.

Al-Shorta's club president Ayad Bunyan described the IFA's decision as "incomplete", stating that the IFA had not done his team justice. Meanwhile, Erbil's club president Abdullah Majeed accepted the IFA's decision on the basis that Al-Shorta and Erbil would both be admitted to the same continental competition for the following season.

== League table ==
Pos	Team	Pld	W	D	L	GF	GA	GD	Pts	Qualification
1	Al-Shorta	21	12	7	2	29	13	+16	43	Qualification for the AFC Cup group stage
2	Erbil	21	12	6	3	29	15	+14	42	Qualification for the AFC Cup group stage
3	Baghdad	23	11	7	5	33	22	+11	40	
4	Al-Quwa Al-Jawiya	22	10	7	5	32	21	+11	37	
5	Naft Al-Junoob	23	9	9	5	26	22	+4	36	
6	Al-Zawraa	22	9	6	7	31	25	+6	33	
7	Duhok	23	7	10	6	30	32	−2	31	
8	Al-Talaba	22	9	4	9	28	30	−2	31	
9	Al-Naft	23	8	6	9	26	27	−1	30	
10	Zakho	21	8	5	8	21	26	−5	29	
11	Al-Minaa	23	6	10	7	26	27	−1	28	
12	Al-Karkh	22	7	4	11	20	25	−5	25	
13	Naft Maysan	21	6	6	9	25	29	−4	24	
14	Karbala	22	2	10	10	12	27	−15	16	
15	Al-Najaf	23	3	7	13	14	31	−17	16	
16	Masafi Al-Wasat	22	2	8	12	18	28	−10	14	

Source: Goalzz
Rules for classification: 1) points; 2) goal difference; 3) number of goals scored.

== Results ==
Home \ Away	KAR	MIN	NFT	NJF	QWJ	SHR	TLB	ZWR	BGD	DUH	ERB	KRB	MAS	NFJ	NFM	ZAK
Al-Karkh		2–1		2–1	1–2	0–2	2–0	0–0	0–1	1–2			3–1	1–1	1–0	
Al-Minaa			0–1	3–1		0–0	2–4	1–0	1–1	2–2		3–1	2–1	0–0	1–1	0–0
Al-Naft	0–1			1–0	2–3	0–0	1–3	1–1	1–0		2–2	3–0	2–0	1–2	1–0	1–1
Al-Najaf	1–0		3–2			0–0	0–0	1–0		0–1	0–1	1–1	1–1	1–1	0–0	
Al-Quwa Al-Jawiya		1–0	1–0	4–0			1–1	1–1	1–1	1–0	1–3		2–1	0–0	5–0	
Al-Shorta	2–2	1–1		1–0	1–0		1–0			5–0	2–1			1–2	2–1	1–0
Al-Talaba	2–1	0–2		1–0	1–5	1–2				2–0	0–2	2–1	2–1		1–2	3–1
Al-Zawraa	2–0	3–0			1–1	0–1	1–0			0–0	1–4	4–0		1–2	2–1	3–2
Baghdad	1–0	1–0	3–0	3–0	1–1	1–2	2–1	1–1			1–2	0–0		3–1		0–1
Duhok	1–0	3–2	3–3	2–0		2–2	1–1	2–1	3–3			2–0	2–2		1–2	0–0
Erbil		1–1	1–0	2–1				2–0	1–1	1–0		0–0	2–0	0–0		
Karbala	0–1		1–1	1–1	0–0	0–0		2–4	0–2		0–1		0–0	0–0	1–2	3–0
Masafi Al-Wasat	1–1	1–2	0–1		3–0			2–3	2–3	0–0	0–0	0–1		2–0		0–0
Naft Al-Junoob		0–0	1–0	1–0	2–0		1–2		1–2	3–2	2–1	0–0			2–5	4–0
Naft Maysan	2–0	2–2			0–1	1–3	1–1		2–0	1–1	1–2		0–0			
Zakho	2–1		1–2	3–2	2–1	1–0		1–2	1–2		2–0		1–0	0–0	2–1	

Source: Goalzz
Legend: Blue = home team win; Yellow = draw; Red = away team win.

== Top scorers ==
Rank	Player	Club	Goals
1	(Iraq) Ali Salah	Al-Talaba	14
2	(Iraq) Amjad Radhi	Erbil	11
3	(Iraq) Marwan Hussein	Al-Zawraa	10
4	(Iraq) Hammadi Ahmed	Al-Quwa Al-Jawiya	9
5	(Lebanon) Khodor Salame	Naft Maysan	8
5	(Syria) Omar Khribin	Al-Quwa Al-Jawiya	8
5	(Iraq) Mohannad Abdul-Raheem	Duhok	8
