= Al-Shorta SC =

Iraqi sports club

Al-Shorta
- Full name: Al-Shorta Sports Club
- Nickname: Al-Qithara (The Harp)
- Founded: 1932; 94 years ago
- Ground: Al-Shorta Stadium
- Capacity: 10,089
- President: Abdul-Halim Fahem
- Head coach: Hussein Abdul-Wahed
- League: Iraq Stars League
- 2025–26: Iraq Stars League, 2nd of 20
- Website: alshortasc.com
Home colours	Away colours

Al-Shorta Sports Club (Arabic: نادي الشرطة الرياضي, lit. 'Police Sports Club') is an Iraqi sports club based in Al-Rusafa, Baghdad, Iraq. It has teams in 19 different sports, and the best known section of the club is the football team, whose origins date back to 1932. The team competes in the Iraq Stars League, the top flight of Iraqi football. Since 2026, the team has played its home matches at Al-Shorta Stadium, which was built on the same site as the club's previous home stadium.

Al-Shorta's football team is one of the most successful in Iraq, having won the Iraq Stars League eight times, the Iraq FA Cup once (completing the domestic double in the 2023–24 season), the Iraqi Super Cup twice and the Baghdad Championship three consecutive times. Al-Shorta hold the Iraq Stars League record for the most consecutive titles, having won four league titles in a row between 2022 and 2025. In international football, Al-Shorta won the inaugural Arab Club Champions Cup title in 1982 and reached the semi-finals in 2023.

Al-Shorta compete in Baghdad derbies with rivals Al-Quwa Al-Jawiya, Al-Zawraa and Al-Talaba, and became the first team to win all six derby matches in one league season in the 2021–22 season. The team is popularly nicknamed "Al-Qithara" (lit. 'The Harp').

== History ==
=== Foundation and early years (1932–1948) ===
The Al-Shorta (Police) football team was formed in 1932 by Mudhafar Ahmed, the director of the Police Schools in Baghdad. Al-Shorta participated in the second edition of the Prince Ghazi Cup in the 1932–33 season, and claimed their first trophy in 1938 by winning the Taha Al-Hashimi Cup, followed by victories in the Al-Quwa Al-Jawiya Cup and Al-Olympi Club Cup in 1939. The team later became known as Madaris Al-Shorta (Police Schools) after a new Police team called Al-Quwa Al-Siyara (Mobile Force) was formed.

=== "Select XI" era (1948–1974) ===
The Iraq Football Association was established in 1948 and it was decided that a Police Select XI (Montakhab Al-Shorta) would compete in the inaugural Baghdad top-flight league season in 1948–49. The Al-Shorta Select XI were relegated from the top-flight that season, and therefore competed in the second division in the 1949–50 season. In the 1950–51 season, Madaris Al-Shorta entered the newly-formed third division and Al-Quwa Al-Siyara competed in the second tier instead of the Al-Shorta Select XI, and the two teams were both leading their respective divisions before the season was abandoned.

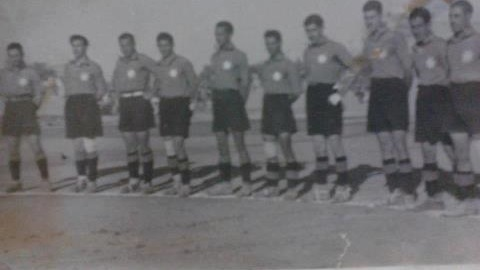
Al-Shorta players lining up before a match in 1937.

From the 1951–52 season, Madaris Al-Shorta and Al-Quwa Al-Siyara combined to form the Al-Shorta Select XI 'A' and 'B' teams to compete in the region's top-flight and second division respectively. Al-Shorta Select XI 'A' finished as runners-up of the top-flight in 1957–58, while Al-Shorta Select XI 'B' finished as runners-up of the second division in 1958–59. In 1960, the Police Games Committee (later renamed to Police Games Directorate) was formed to control Police sports in Iraq, and they decided to expand the Police force's sporting activities for the 1960–61 season. Al-Quwa Al-Siyara re-entered the IFA's football pyramid as an individual team, joining the regional second division along with newly-formed Police teams Aliyat Al-Shorta and Shortat Al-Najda, while the Al-Shorta Select XI 'A' and 'B' teams continued to compete in the top-flight and second division respectively. After finishing as Iraq Central FA Premier League runners-up again in 1960–61, Al-Shorta Select XI 'A' won the league title for the first time in the 1962–63 season.

At the end of that season, Aliyat Al-Shorta secured promotion to the top-flight, meaning there were two Police teams in the top division. As a result, the Al-Shorta Select XI 'A' team were replaced in the top-flight by Madaris Al-Shorta from the 1963–64 season, while the Al-Shorta Select XI 'B' team were disbanded. From this point, the Al-Shorta Select XI would only compete in the Republic Championship and in matches against visiting foreign teams. Formed from the best players of the individual Police teams, the Al-Shorta Select XI won the Republic Championship in both 1968 and 1969. The Al-Shorta Select XI was led by the coach of Aliyat Al-Shorta, Mohammed Najeeb Kaban, and included many of the star players from Aliyat Al-Shorta, a team that went on to win four league titles and reach the final of the 1971 Asian Champion Club Tournament where they refused to face Israeli side Maccabi Tel Aviv.

Timeline of league participation
1948–1949: Al-Shorta Select XI (L1); 1949–1950: Al-Shorta Select XI (L2); 1950–1951: Select XI not in league	1951–1963: Al-Shorta Select XI 'A' (L1); Al-Shorta Select XI 'B' (L2); 1963–1974: Select XI not in league; 1974–present: Al-Shorta SC (L1)

L1 = Level 1 of the league system; L2 = Level 2 of the league system

=== Club transition and Arab title (1974–1990) ===
In 1974, the Iraq Football Association (IFA) decided to implement a clubs-only policy for domestic competitions, forming the Iraqi National Clubs League which was only open to clubs and not institute-representative teams such as the individual Police teams. With the IFA dictating that only a single club would be allowed to represent the Police in the new top-flight, Al-Shorta Sports Club was provisionally established on 18 August 1974 by the Iraqi Olympic Committee and was placed under the control of the Police Games Directorate (PGD) until the club's formal establishment. The PGD was strongly opposed to the IFA's new clubs-only policy and thus decided to field a team of amateurs for Al-Shorta to compete in the inaugural 1974–75 season in protest. After suffering heavy defeats in their first two games, the amateur players were replaced by players from the Shortat Al-Najda and Kuliyat Al-Shorta teams for the remainder of the season, before ten Aliyat Al-Shorta players joined the team for the 1975–76 season. Al-Shorta was formally established as a sports club in 1978, registering as such with the Ministry of Youth and Sports and being attached to the Ministry of Interior. Al-Shorta won their first national league title in the 1979–80 season, finishing ahead of rivals Al-Zawraa on goal difference under the leadership of former player Douglas Aziz. This qualified them for the inaugural Arab Club Champions Cup in 1981–82, and Al-Shorta became the first ever Arab club champions with a 4–2 aggregate win over Al-Nejmeh in the final.

In 1983, the club changed their name to Qiwa Al-Amn Al-Dakhili (Internal Security Forces) while Iraq was at war; that name only lasted for one season before they returned to the name Al-Shorta. In 1985, Al-Shorta won the Arab Police Championship for the third time while representing Iraq, having previously won in 1976 and 1978.

=== Resurgence and national records (1990–2003) ===

Starting line-up for 3–2 win against Al-Sulaikh which secured the 1997–98 league title.

On 23 December 1990, Al-Shorta played their first match at the original Al-Shorta Stadium, which was built with the help of volunteers and club workers, beating Al-Tijara 3–2. In the 1993–94 season, Al-Shorta striker Younis Abid Ali scored 36 league goals which remains an Iraqi record for most goals scored by a player in one league season.

There were three contenders for the 1997–98 Iraqi Premier League title going into the final day of the season; Al-Quwa Al-Jawiya were on top of the league with Al-Shorta in second and Al-Zawraa third. Al-Quwa Al-Jawiya were playing Al-Zawraa at the same time as Al-Shorta were playing Al-Sulaikh. Al-Shorta were 2–1 down to Al-Sulaikh before an 84th-minute goal from Mufeed Assem and a 91st-minute penalty kick from league top scorer Mahmoud Majeed earned a dramatic 3–2 victory, which was enough to overtake Al-Quwa Al-Jawiya (who had drawn 1–1 with Al-Zawraa) and achieve their second Premier League title and first for eighteen years. In the process, Al-Shorta broke the Iraqi records for most consecutive wins in a league season (11, later equalled by Al-Quwa Al-Jawiya) and most consecutive league games scored in (43). That season also saw them reach the quarter-finals of the Asian Cup Winners' Cup, earning wins over Al-Seeb and Bargh Shiraz before being eliminated in the quarter-final.

Al-Shorta reached the quarter-finals of the 1999–2000 Asian Club Championship before making history by becoming the first club to win the Umm al-Ma'arik Championship (later known as the Baghdad Championship) three times in a row, winning the trophy in the 2000–01, 2001–02 and 2002–03 seasons. They were also in the lead of the 2002–03 league competition before it was cancelled due to the Iraq War.

=== Post-war instability (2003–2012) ===
In April 2003, the club's former goalkeeper and captain Raad Hammoudi became Al-Shorta's president and saved the club from bankruptcy after the war. Al-Shorta participated in the 2003 edition of the Arab Club Champions Cup and the 2004 and 2005 editions of the AFC Champions League but were knocked out at the group stage each time.

Al-Shorta entered into an unstable post-war period, often dominating the initial group stage in the league (topping their group in each of the 2005–06, 2006–07 and 2007–08 seasons) but failing to sustain their performance into the later stages of the season. The club's fortunes declined towards the end of the decade which culminated in a relegation battle in the 2010–11 campaign, with Amjad Kalaf's brace against Al-Naft on the last day of the season saving the club from relegation to the Iraqi First Division League for the first time.

=== Golden era and dominance (2012–present) ===

Starting line-up for 3–0 win against Al-Talaba which secured the 2012–13 league title.

Al-Shorta returned to the top of Iraqi football in the 2012–13 season, securing their third Iraqi Premier League title with a final-day 3–0 victory over rivals Al-Talaba at Al-Shaab Stadium. Al-Shorta finished in first place in the Premier League in 2013–14 under Brazilian coach Lorival Santos but the season was ended prematurely due to the worsening war situation in the country. Al-Shorta also appeared in the 2014 AFC Champions League qualifiers, losing 1–0 to Al-Kuwait, which was followed by a group stage elimination at the 2014 AFC Cup and a round of 16 exit at the 2015 AFC Cup.

Al-Shorta won the Premier League title again in 2018–19, led by Montenegrin coach Nebojša Jovović, equalling the Iraqi record for most consecutive league games unbeaten (39) in the process. Al-Shorta won the Iraqi Super Cup for the first time in 2019 with a penalty shootout win over Al-Zawraa, before reaching the quarter-finals of the 2019–20 Arab Club Champions Cup and being eliminated from the group stages of the 2020 and 2021 AFC Champions Leagues, the former on goal difference.

Under the management of Egyptian coach Moamen Soliman, Al-Shorta enjoyed one of the best league seasons in their history in 2021–22. Al-Shorta set a record for the earliest Iraqi Premier League title win with seven rounds of the competition remaining, finishing a record 21 points clear at the top of the table, and became the first club to beat all other teams in a 20-team season and the first club to win all Baghdad derbies home and away in one season. Their tally of 91 points equalled the record for the most points in a 38-game season in Iraq. Al-Shorta went on to win the 2022 Iraqi Super Cup with a 1–0 victory over Al-Karkh, and then retained their Iraqi Premier League crown by clinching the 2022–23 title in the penultimate round of the season. Al-Shorta also reached the semi-finals of the 2023 Arab Club Champions Cup, defeating CS Sfaxien and Al-Sadd before losing 1–0 to Al-Nassr from a penalty scored by Cristiano Ronaldo.

Al-Shorta were crowned champions of the 2023–24 Iraq Stars League, the first edition of the competition since it had been transformed into a professional league, and coupled that success with their first Iraq FA Cup title, beating Al-Quwa Al-Jawiya 1–0 in the final to secure the domestic double for the first time. Al-Shorta became the first club in Iraq to win four consecutive league championships when they clinched the title again in the 2024–25 season. The new Al-Shorta Stadium with a capacity of 10,089 seats was opened for its first match on 8 November 2025.

== Emblem ==
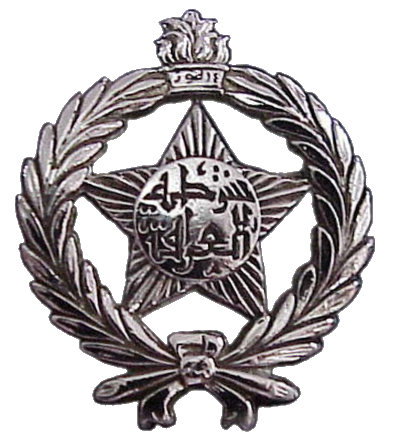
Al-Shorta's first logo was based on the logo of the Iraqi Police (pictured).

Al-Shorta's first club crest was the same as the logo of the Iraqi Police, with the addition of the Olympic rings at the bottom alongside the club's name and the year 1978, which was the year of the club's formal establishment. Al-Shorta began to wear a harp on their shirts in the 1992–93 season, after television presenter Majid Abdul-Haq coined the now-popular nickname Al-Qithara (The Harp) to refer to the club on his program Letter of the League by likening the team's attractive style of play to the tunes of a musical instrument. In 2002, laurel leaves were added either side of the harp on the shirt, and the Olympic rings were added underneath it.

In 2005, Al-Shorta adopted a new emblem which was blue with a green outline, with a harp featuring in the centre of the crest along with the Iraq flag. Under the presidency of Raad Hammoudi, the club decided to recognise 1975 as its year of foundation, as this was the year in which the Police Games Directorate accepted the new clubs-only policy in Iraqi football and integrated its top players into Al-Shorta Sports Club which had been provisionally established along with the Iraqi National Clubs League a year prior. Thus, 1975 was written on either side of the logo in English and Arabic, and this remained the club's crest for the next seven years.

In 2012, the club's new administrative body headed by Ayad Bunyan decided to recognise 1932 as the club's year of foundation, as the club's origins date back to the football team that formed in 1932 and went on to compete in the Iraq Central FA Premier League. This came with a change to the club's logo in the form of a new white circular crest with a green outline, which contained the harp, laurel leaves and Olympic rings inside it along with the club's name and year of foundation at the bottom.

On 12 December 2013, before the start of the 2014 AFC Champions League qualifying play-off, Al-Shorta announced the change to a new logo which was designed by Luay Abdul-Rahman, the artistic director of Al-Shorta's newspaper. The centre of the logo features a golden harp on a green and white backdrop, and the club's year of foundation and the Iraq flag feature at the top and bottom of the logo respectively. The club's name in English is displayed in a golden banner towards the bottom of the logo.

On 18 November 2020, the club revealed a brand new crest as part of a ceremony to celebrate its 88th anniversary. However, the logo change was abandoned after a negative reception from supporters.

== Kits ==
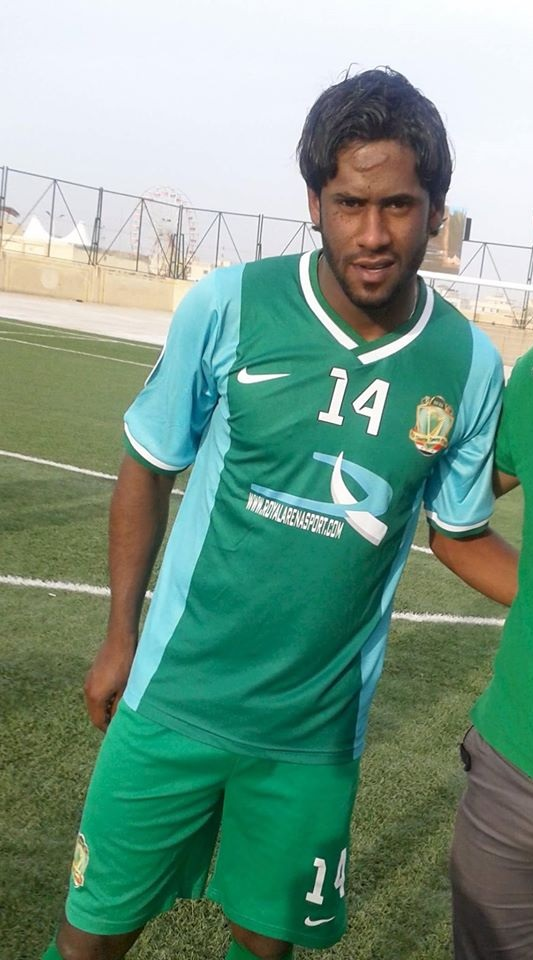
Amjad Kalaf wearing Al-Shorta's home kit in the 2013–14 season.

In 1958, the Al-Shorta Select XI had a yellow and brown kit, and also had an all-white kit. The team began to wear purple kits under the leadership of coach Mohammed Najeeb Kaban in the 1960s. Since 1978, Al-Shorta have mainly worn green home kits, white away kits and purple third kits, with the exception of the 1983–84 season when they wore a black home shirt while playing under the name Qiwa Al-Amn Al-Dakhili (Internal Security Forces).

Since the 2016–17 season, Al-Shorta have worn purple as the away kit colour rather than white. In August 2020, Al-Shorta launched their own clothing brand called Qitharah to manufacture kits and other apparel for the club, which continued until August 2025 when the club signed a contract with kit manufacturer Kelme.

=== Shirt sponsors ===
Al-Shorta's shirts have featured a number of different sponsors' logos over the years:

Period	Shirt sponsor
1995	Abu Saif Markets
1998–1999	Al-Mansour Tea
1999–2003	Samsung
2003	Peugeot
2003	New Iraq Charitable Foundation
2005	Motorola
2005–2006	Lay's
2006	Kotsons
2007	MTC-Vodafone
2008	Asia Cell (on front); IraqCom (on back)
2014–2015	Royal Arena Sport

== Supporters ==
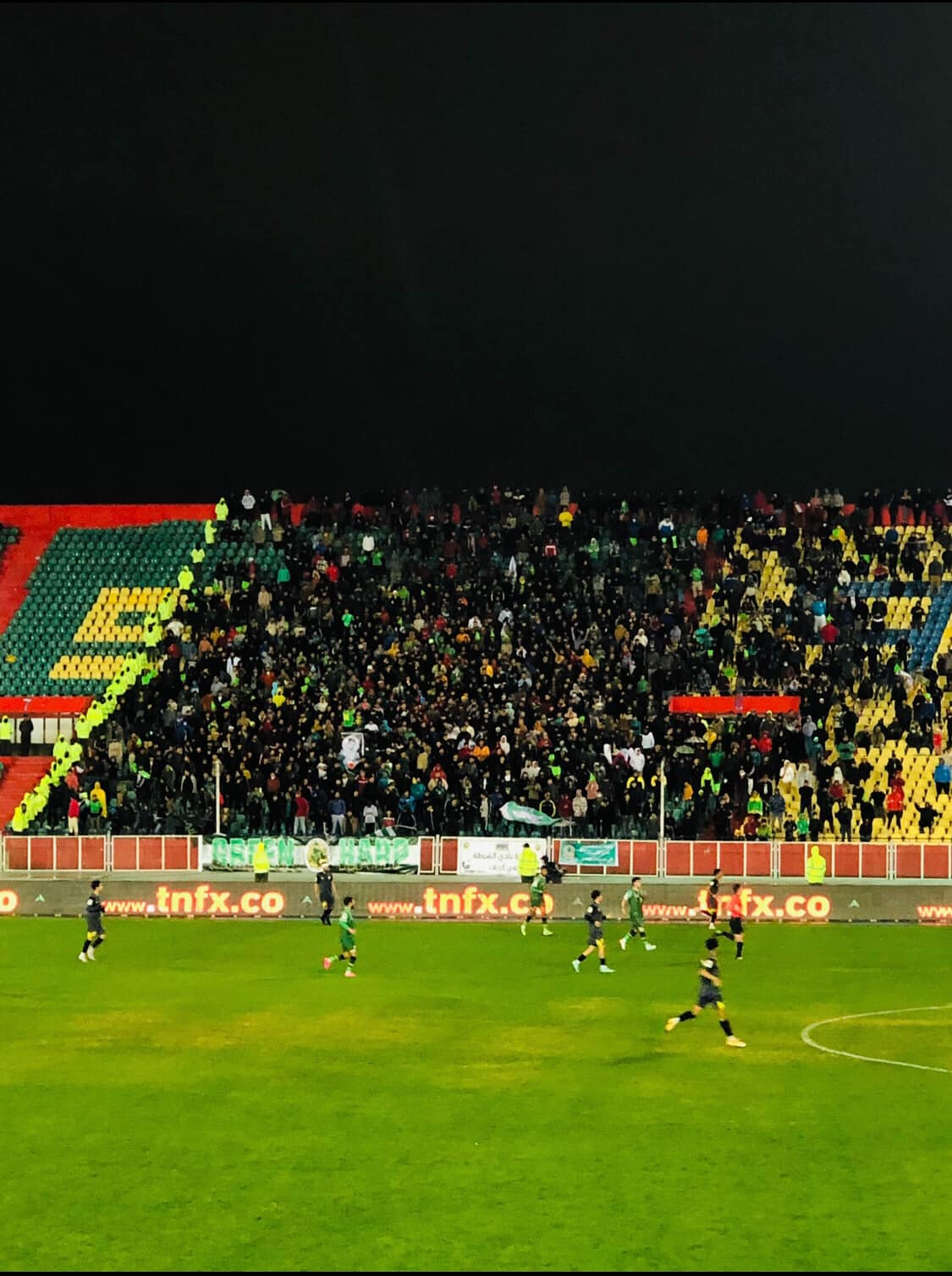
Al-Shorta playing in front of their supporters at Al-Shaab Stadium in 2022.

Al-Shorta are one of the most widely supported clubs in Iraq. In a poll conducted on the Asian Football Confederation's official website in 2020, Al-Shorta ranked as the second most popular club in Iraq behind rivals Al-Zawraa. Al-Shorta are also the second-most followed Iraqi club on both Facebook and Twitter, behind Al-Zawraa.

Ultras Green Harp is an ultras group that was formed in 2012 at the start of the 2012–13 season and has grown to become one of Iraq's largest fan groups. It is a self-financed group that travels to both home and away matches across Iraq, providing flags and banners for fans to wave during the game. Before kickoff, the Ultras Green Harp members often hold up a large banner which can vary depending on the opposition. Another prominent fan group called Majaneen Al-Qithara was founded in 2017.

== Rivalries ==
Al-Shorta are one of the top four clubs in Baghdad along with Al-Quwa Al-Jawiya, Al-Zawraa, and Al-Talaba; these four clubs together contest the Baghdad derbies. The Baghdad derbies are often considered to be the most important games of a season and they are usually held at neutral venues such as Al-Shaab Stadium to accommodate a larger number of spectators.

Al-Shorta's rivalry with Al-Quwa Al-Jawiya is the longest-standing, with its origins dating back to the 1930s. Al-Quwa Al-Jawiya are also Al-Shorta's local rivals as the two clubs' stadiums are located within a short distance of each other on Falastin Street.

Al-Shorta also compete in the "Al-Dakhiliya derbies" with fellow Ministry of Interior clubs Al-Hudood and Aliyat Al-Shorta.

== Stadiums ==
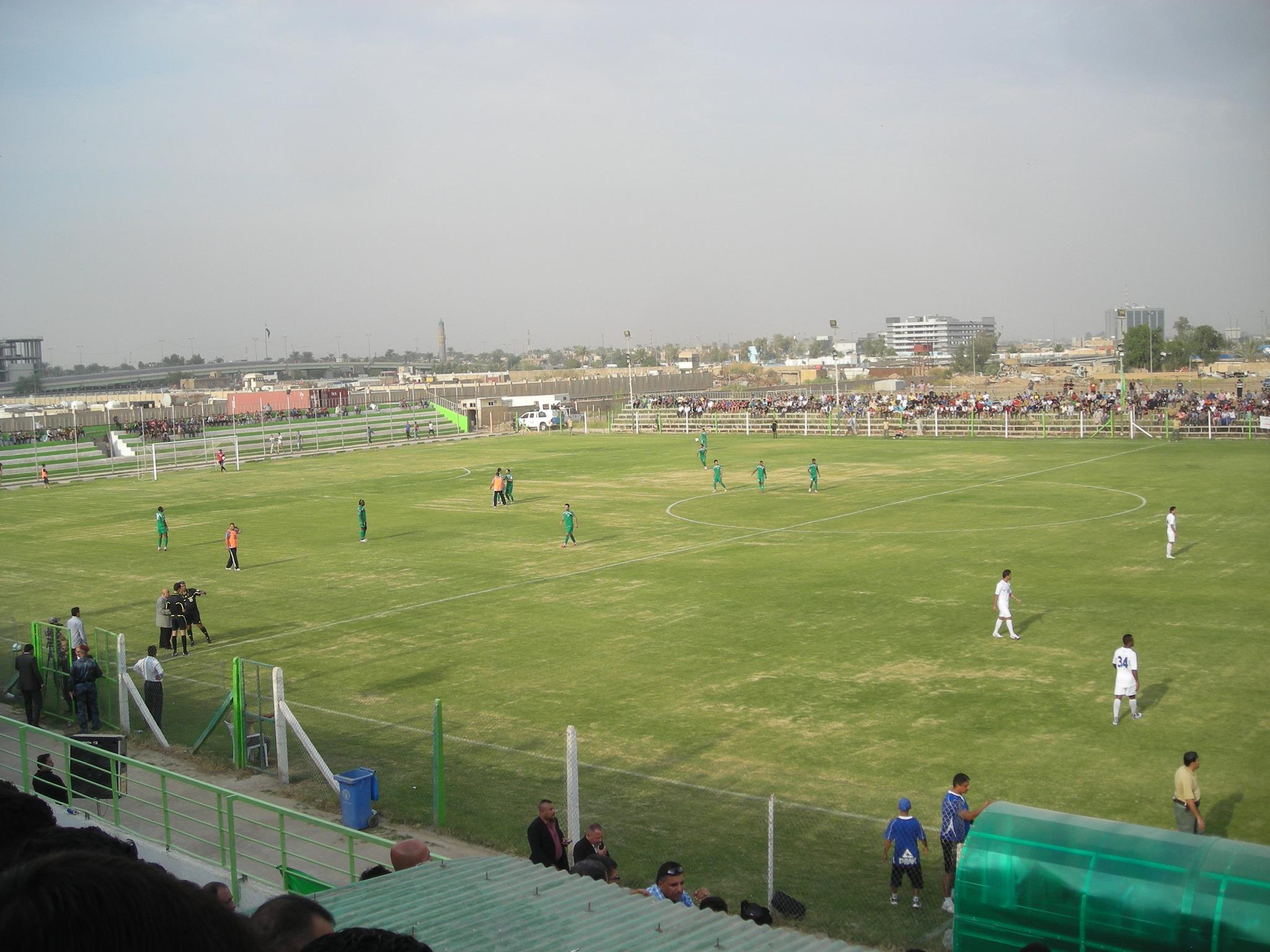
The original Al-Shorta Stadium in 2012.

In their early years, the Al-Shorta Select XI played their home matches on the playing field at the team's headquarters, located on what would become Falastin Street in the early 1960s. After the establishment of the Iraqi National Clubs League, the club played their home games at the Local Administration Stadium in Al-Mansour and later at Al-Furusiya Stadium owned by the Ministry of Interior.

In the 1980s, the club decided to build their own stadium at the club's headquarters, with construction of the four stands being overseen by club president Abdul-Qadir Zeinal and work being carried out by club workers and volunteers. The original Al-Shorta Stadium was opened for its first match on 23 December 1990 with Al-Shorta beating Al-Tijara 3–2. The stadium was able to hold 8,634 people, while the white hall on the side of the field (named the Abid Kadhim Hall in honour of former player and manager Abid Kadhim) can hold approximately 2,000 people.

In the 2012–13 season, Al-Shorta announced plans to build a sports complex called Al-Shorta Sports City, which would include a new all-seater stadium. The complex was to be constructed by Swedish company Nordic Sport through its regional partner Nynord, along with Emirati company AKG Engineering. Börje Österberg, the owner of Nordic Sport, announced the initiation of construction of Al-Shorta Sports City on 16 December 2013, and the club's existing stadium was demolished in March 2014. Al-Shorta played their home matches at Al-Shaab Stadium while the new stadium was being constructed.

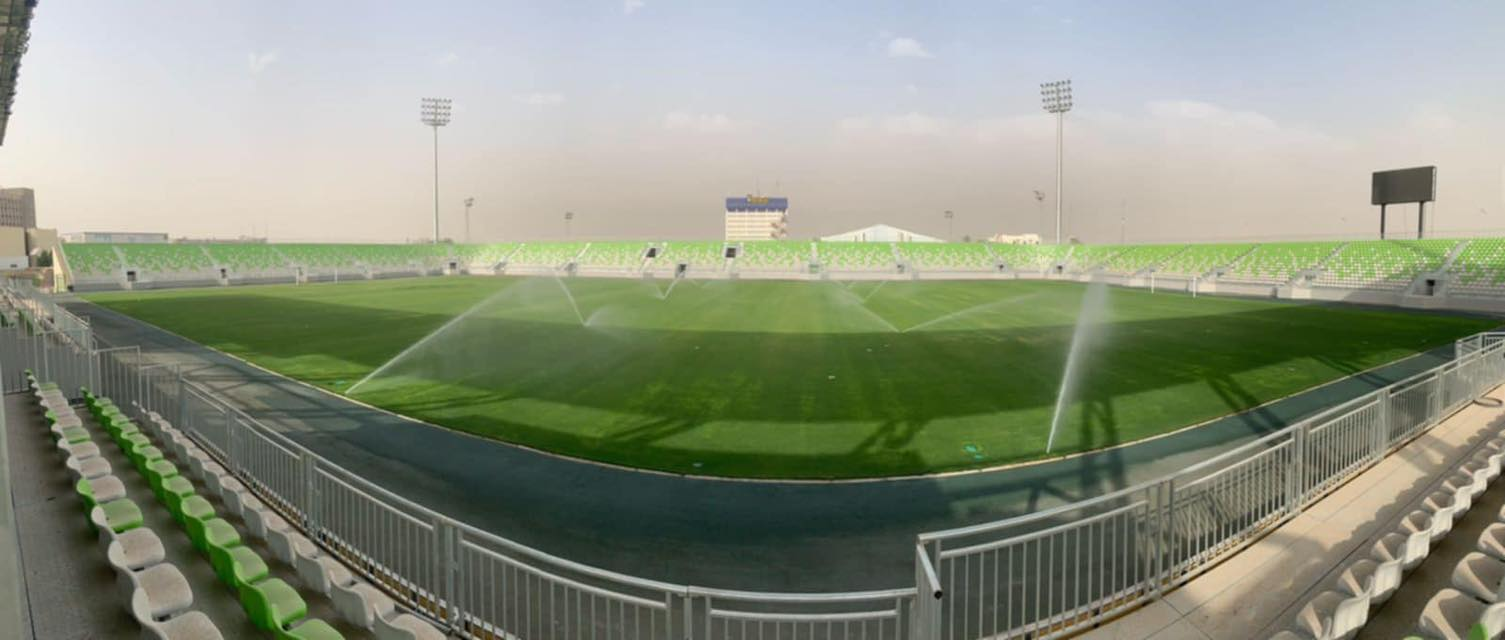
The new Al-Shorta Stadium in 2025.

On 7 January 2015, AKG Engineering released a video showing what the sports complex was expected to look like once construction is completed. The complex would include a new all-seater stadium with a capacity of 10,089, as well as a training ground with athletics tracks, a hotel, a club office, an indoor swimming pool with 1,500 seats, a multi-purpose closed hall with 2,500 seats, a full-quality recreation club (with sports facilities), restaurants, theatres and a shopping centre.

Construction work on the sports complex was suspended in December 2015 before resuming in November 2022, however the project was scaled down to only include the all-seater stadium and the training ground. The new Al-Shorta Stadium was opened for its first match on 8 November 2025.

== Players ==
=== First-team squad ===
As of 7 September 2026

Note: Flags indicate national team as defined under FIFA eligibility rules; some limited exceptions apply. Players may hold more than one non-FIFA nationality.

No.	Pos.	Nation	Player
1	GK	IRQ	Mohammed Karim
2	DF	IRQ	Adam Rasheed
3	DF	IRQ	Mujtaba Saleh
4	DF	VEN	Rubén Ramírez
5	DF	IRQ	Maitham Jabbar
6	DF	IRQ	Abbas Fadhel
8	MF	IRQ	Ayad Abd Farhan
9	MF	IRQ	Hussein Ali
10	FW	CMR	Leonel Ateba
11	MF	IRQ	Bassam Shakir
12	GK	IRQ	Jalal Hassan (captain)
13	MF	COD	Boaz Ngalamulume
14	MF	NIG	Abdoul Madjid Moumouni
15	DF	IRQ	Ahmed Yahya

No.	Pos.	Nation	Player
16	GK	IRQ	Hassan Ahmed
17	FW	IRQ	Ahmed Farhan
18	FW	IRQ	Mohanad Ali (vice-captain)
19	MF	IRQ	Ali Mohsin
20	MF	IRQ	Murtadha Hassan
23	FW	NGR	Kingsley Fidelis Kuku
25	MF	IRQ	Atheer Salih
26	MF	IRQ	Abdul-Khaliq Mohammed
29	FW	IRQ	Abdullah Bassim
31	DF	IRQ	Ahmed Zero
32	DF	COL	Diego Hernández
33	MF	ARG	Cristian Barco
34	GK	IRQ	Abbas Tariq

=== Out on loan ===
Note: Flags indicate national team as defined under FIFA eligibility rules; some limited exceptions apply. Players may hold more than one non-FIFA nationality.

No.	Pos.	Nation	Player
—	MF	IRQ	Abdul-Razzaq Qasim (on loan at Al-Minaa until the end of the 2026–27 season)

== Personnel ==
=== Technical staff ===
Position	Name	Nationality
Head coach:	Hussein Abdul-Wahed	(Iraq)
Assistant coach:	Osama Ali	(Iraq)
Fitness coach:	Mazin Abdul-Sattar	(Iraq)
Goalkeeping coach:	Ibrahim Salem	(Iraq)
Team manager:	Hashim Ridha	(Iraq)

=== Management ===
Position	Name	Nationality
President:	Abdul-Halim Fahem	(Iraq)
Vice-president:	Ali Al-Shahmani	(Iraq)
Board secretary:	Alaa Bahar Al-Uloom	(Iraq)
Financial secretary	Tahseen Al-Yassri	(Iraq)
Member of the Board:	Uday Al-Rubaie	(Iraq)
Member of the Board:	Abdul-Wahab Al-Taei	(Iraq)
Member of the Board:	Ghalib Al-Zamili	(Iraq)
Member of the Board:	Ihsan Ali	(Iraq)
Member of the Board:	Mustafa Jabbar Alak	(Iraq)
Member of the Board:	Hussein Subhan	(Iraq)

== Managers ==
In 1958, the Al-Shorta Select XI appointed their first foreign manager in Palestinian coach Dennis Nasrawi. Since 1974, Al-Shorta have been coached by eleven foreign managers from seven countries. The first of these was Yugoslavian coach Rajko Menista who took charge of Al-Shorta from 1982 to 1983.

Since 2013, Al-Shorta have hired two Brazilian managers (Lorival Santos and Marcos Paquetá), three Egyptian managers (Mohamed Youssef, Moamen Soliman and Mohamed Azima), one Jordanian manager (Haitham Al-Shboul as caretaker), one Montenegrin manager (Nebojša Jovović), one Serbian manager (Aleksandar Ilić) and two Tunisian managers (Chiheb Ellili and Sami Trabelsi). The rest of the club's managers throughout history have been of Iraqi nationality.

=== Notable managers ===
The following managers won at least one major trophy when in charge of the team:

Name	Period	Trophies
Al-Shorta Select XI
(Iraq) Fahmi Al-Qaimaqchi	1951–1955, 1960–1966	Iraq Central FA Premier League
Al-Shorta SC
(Iraq) Douglas Aziz	1979–1982, 1983, 1987–1989, 1990–1991, 1993	Iraq Stars League, Arab Club Champions Cup
(Iraq) Abdelilah Abdul-Hameed	1997–1998, 2002–2003	Iraq Stars League
(Iraq) Ahmed Radhi	1999–2001	Baghdad Championship
(Iraq) Yassin Umal	2001–2002	Baghdad Championship
(Iraq) Basim Qasim	1994, 1996, 2002, 2003, 2011–2012	Baghdad Championship
(Iraq) Thair Jassam	2012–2013, 2015, 2018	Iraq Stars League
(Montenegro) Nebojša Jovović	2018–2019	Iraq Stars League
(Serbia) Aleksandar Ilić	2019–2020, 2020–2021	Iraqi Super Cup
(Egypt) Moamen Soliman	2021–2023, 2024, 2025–2026	Iraq Stars League (3), Iraq FA Cup, Iraqi Super Cup
(Iraq) Ahmed Salah	2018, 2019, 2023, 2024, 2026	Iraq Stars League

== Honours ==
=== Major ===
Type	Competition	Titles	Seasons
Al-Shorta SC
Domestic (national)	Iraq Stars League	8	1979–80, 1997–98, 2012–13, 2018–19, 2021–22, 2022–23, 2023–24, 2024–25
Domestic (national)	Iraq FA Cup	1	2023–24
Domestic (national)	Iraqi Super Cup	2	2019, 2022
Domestic (national)	Baghdad Championship	3^{s}	2000–01, 2001–02, 2002–03
International	Arab Club Champions Cup	1	1981–82
Al-Shorta Select XI
Domestic (regional)	Iraq Central FA Premier League	1	1962–63

- record
- ^{S} shared record

=== Minor ===
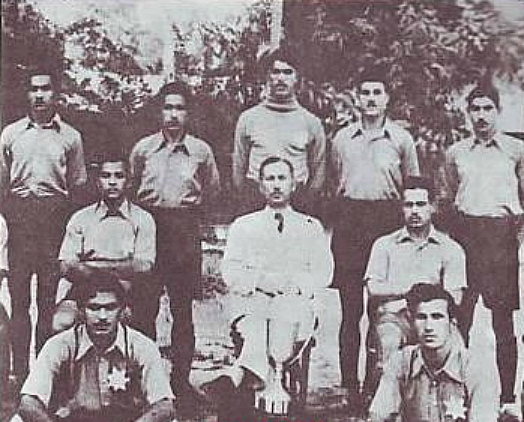
Al-Shorta players with the Taha Al-Hashimi Cup that they won in 1938.

Competition	Titles	Seasons
Al-Shorta SC
Baghdad Cup	1	2013
Al-Quds International Championship	1	2002
Baghdad Day Cup	1	2000
Great Victory Championship	1	1996
Al-Qadisiya Championship	1	1988
President's Gold Cup	1	1983
Al-Shorta Select XI
Republic Championship	2	1968, 1969
Hilla Mutasarrif Cup	1	1957
Al-Olympi Club Cup	1	1939
Al-Quwa Al-Jawiya Cup	1	1939
Taha Al-Hashimi Cup	1	1938

== Records ==
=== Matches ===
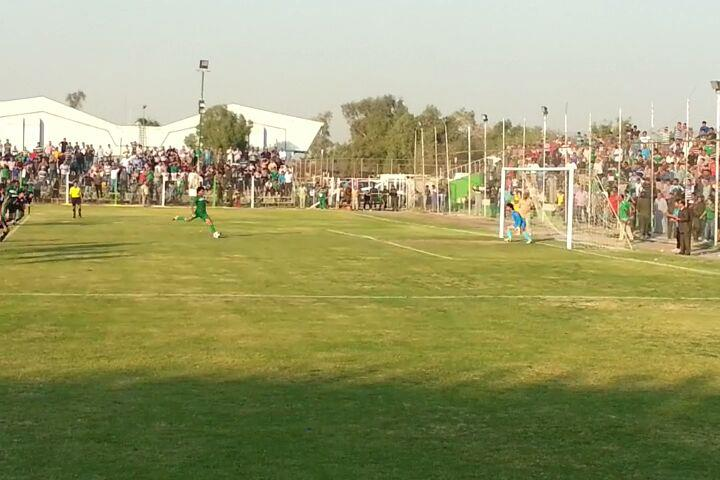
Nashat Akram (pictured) scored a hat-trick in Al-Shorta's record league win on 18 October 2002 (8–0 against Duhok).

Firsts

- First match: Al-Lasilki 1–1 Al-Shorta, Prince Ghazi Cup, December 1932
- First Central FA Premier League match: Al-Kuliya Al-Askariya Al-Malakiya 5–1 Al-Shorta Select XI, 5 November 1948
- First FA Cup match: Al-Shorta Select XI w/o from Kuliyat Al-Huqooq, first round, January 1949
- First National Clubs League match: Al-Muwasalat 3–0 Al-Shorta, 4 October 1974
- First competitive match at the original Al-Shorta Stadium: Al-Shorta 3–2 Al-Tijara, National Clubs League, 23 December 1990
- First competitive match at the new Al-Shorta Stadium: Al-Shorta 1–0 Zakho, Stars League, 4 January 2026

Wins

- Record win: 11–0 against Al-Samawa, FA Cup round of 32, 16 November 1998
- Record League win: 8–0 against Duhok, First Division League, 18 October 2002
- Record League qualifying win: 10–1 against Al-Hudood, 25 September 2000
- Record Baghdad Championship win: 7–1 against Salahaddin, group stage, 5 December 2000
- Record win in an AFC competition: 5–0 against Al-Wahda, Asian Club Championship second round, 18 November 1999
- Record win in an UAFA competition: 5–0 against FC Nouadhibou, Arab Club Champions Cup second round, 25 November 2019

Defeats

- Record defeat: 0–11 against Al-Naqil, National Clubs League, 12 October 1974
- Record FA Cup defeat: 0–4
  - against Al-Zawraa, quarter-final, 14 September 1978
  - against Al-Jaish, quarter-final, 15 September 1987
- Record Baghdad Championship defeat: 0–6 against Al-Quwa Al-Jawiya, group stage, February 1996
- Record defeat in an AFC competition: 0–5
  - against Al-Hilal, AFC Champions League Elite league stage, 1 October 2024
  - against Al-Ahli, AFC Champions League Elite league stage, 22 December 2025
- Record defeat in an UAFA competition: 0–6 against Al-Shabab, Arab Club Champions Cup quarter-final, 23 December 2019

Consecutive results

- Record consecutive League wins: 11, Premier League, from 13 March 1998 to 22 May 1998
- Record consecutive League matches scored in: 43, Premier League, from 4 April 1997 to 13 November 1998
- Record consecutive League defeats: 6, Elite League, from 15 July 2012 to 10 August 2012
- Record consecutive League matches without a defeat: 39, Premier League, from 21 May 2018 to 23 May 2019

=== Attendances ===
- Highest attendance: 68,000, against Al-Zawraa at Al-Shaab Stadium, National Clubs League, 13 December 1991

=== Appearances ===
- Youngest first-team player: Mohanad Ali, 13 years, 279 days (against Al-Talaba, Premier League, 26 March 2014)
- First international cap while an Al-Shorta Select XI player: Ali Karim, for Iraq in 1957
- Most international caps while an Al-Shorta player: Raad Hammoudi, 104 for Iraq
- First players to play at the World Cup: Raad Hammoudi (starter) and Basim Qasim (substitute), for Iraq against Paraguay on 4 June 1986
- Most players in an Iraq starting line-up: 7
  - against Kuwait on 22 December 2014
  - against Bahrain on 23 December 2017
  - against United Arab Emirates on 29 November 2019

=== Goals ===
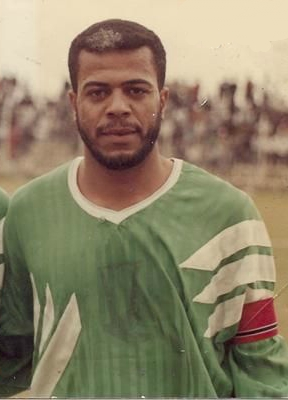
Al-Shorta's Younis Abid Ali set a national record for the most goals scored in one league season (36) in 1993–94.

- Most League goals in a season: Younis Abid Ali, 36 goals in the National Clubs League, 1993–94
- Most FA Cup goals in a season: Hashim Ridha, 14 goals, 1998–99
- Most goals in one League match: Ahmed Khudhair, 5 goals (against Al-Kut, Elite League, 14 June 2001)
- Most goals in one FA Cup match: Saeed Nouri, 5 goals (against Salahaddin, 16 May 1989)
- Most goals in AFC and UAFA competitions: 5
  - Alaa Kadhim (3 in the Asian Cup Winners' Cup, 2 in the Asian Club Championship)
  - Marwan Hussein (4 in the AFC Cup, 1 in the Arab Club Champions Cup)
- First ever goalscorer: Abid Abtou (against Al-Lasilki, Prince Ghazi Cup, November 1932)
- First National Clubs League top scorer: Zahrawi Jaber (1976–77)
- Most League top scorer awards: Hashim Ridha, 2 (1998–99 and 2001–02)
- First foreign goalscorer: Innocent Awoa (against Al-Sinaa, Elite League, 20 October 2012)
- First foreign hat-trick scorer: Jean Michel N'Lend (against Al-Quwa Al-Jawiya, Elite League, 18 November 2012)
- First goalkeeper to score: Raad Hammoudi (against Al-Samawa, National Clubs League, 1975–76)
- Fastest goalscorer: 9.504 seconds, Alaa Abdul-Zahra (against Naft Al-Junoob, Premier League, 21 October 2018)

==== Top goalscorers ====
Iraq Stars League (1974–present) matches only.
As of 8 November 2026.

#	Name	Goals	Years
1	(Iraq) Younis Abid Ali	135	1983–1986, 1990–1997, 1998–1999
2	(Iraq) Hashim Ridha	99	1998–2002, 2003–2009, 2010–2011
3	(Iraq) Mohanad Ali	82	2014–2019, 2023–2025, 2026–present
4	(Iraq) Alaa Abdul-Zahra	78	2014–2015, 2017–2020, 2021–2024
5	(Syria) Mahmoud Al-Mawas	74	2021–2026
6	(Iraq) Ali Hussein Mahmoud	58 (Note: Two goals against Babil from the 1976–77 season are not counted as the results from the second half of the season were annulled.)	1974–1983
6	(Iraq) Amjad Kalaf	58	2007–2010, 2010–2016
8	(Iraq) Saad Qais	45	1983–1986, 1990–1991, 1994–1995, 1996–1998, 1999–2001
9	(Iraq) Faisal Aziz	42	1977–1989
10	(Iraq) Mufeed Assem	41	1996–1998, 1999–2003

== See also ==
- Iraqi football clubs in Asian competitions
- Al-Shorta SC (basketball)
