= Al-Karkh SC =

Iraqi football club

- Full name: Al-Karkh Educational Sports Club
- Nickname: Canary or Al-Ghawassa Al-Safraa
- Founded: 1963; 63 years ago
- Ground: Sharar Haidar Stadium
- Capacity: 5,150
- President: Kareem Hammadi
- Manager: Haitham Shaaban
- League: Iraq Stars League
- 2025–26: Iraq Stars League, 7th of 20
Home colours	Away colours

Al-Karkh Educational Sports Club (Arabic: نادي الكرخ التربوي الرياضي), commonly known as Al-Karkh SC, is an Iraqi sports club based in Karkh, Baghdad. Its professional football team plays in the Iraq Stars League, the top tier of the Iraqi football. The club's home stadium is Sharar Haidar Stadium.

Founded in 1963, Al-Karkh was not successful in reaching the top flight of Iraqi football until Al-Rasheed SC's properties and place in the top division were transferred to Al-Karkh when Al-Rasheed was dissolved in 1990. In 2022, Al-Karkh achieved its first Iraq FA Cup title with a 2–1 victory over Al-Kahrabaa in the final.

== History ==
In the late-1940s, a basketball club was established under the name of Al-Mansour Club, where a lot of national basketball players started. The team won the 1958 Adhamiya Tournament with thousands of people either celebrating in the court or crowding outside of it. In 1974, the club was merged with Al-Karkh Sports Club.

Since it was founded in 1963, Al-Karkh were unsuccessful to get promoted to the Iraq Central FA Premier League or later the Iraqi Premier League. For 27 years, they had been languishing in the lower divisions.

Taking the Al-Mansour Local Administration Stadium as his club's, on 23 November 1983, Uday Hussein founded a new sports club named Al-Rasheed. Al-Rasheed soon won the lower division in their first season followed by three top division league titles, two FA Cups, three Arab Club Champions Cup trophies and a runners-up spot at the AFC Champions League, all between 1983 and 1990.

On 18 August 1990, the Iraqi Olympic Committee decided to dissolve Al-Rasheed Sports Club, transferring all of its properties to Al-Karkh Sports Club, and replaced Al-Rasheed with Al-Karkh in the Iraqi Premier League.

When Al-Karkh replaced Al-Rasheed's place in the Iraqi Premier League, the team for the first time in their history played in the top tier of Iraqi football. Most of the Iraq national team players left, retiring, like Adnan Dirjal, Haris Mohammed, and Samir Shaker, or transferring to other teams, like Ahmed Radhi, Laith Hussein, and Habib Jafar. In their first season in the senior division, 1990–91, they finished in 4th place at 38 points.

Being coached by Adnan Dirjal, Al-Karkh, on Dirjal's first season as a coach, finished in the furthest place they have ever been in the league, which is 3rd place in the 1991–92 season, three points away from the leaders. Dirjal received the best Iraqi coach award for the team's performance through the season, while Saad Qais Noaman received the best player award. Al-Karkh also finished in 4th place in the 1st Umm al-Ma'arik Championship.

In the seasons of 1992–93, 1993–94, 1994–95 and 1995–96, Al-Karkh managed to keep an average of 9th place in the league, where Ammo Baba, in the 1994–95 season, made the team reach the lowest he had ever reached with an Iraqi team through his entire managing career, which was 7th place. The Iraq FA Cup editions from 1992 to 1996 didn't witness Al-Karkh succeeding in passing the round of 16, while in the Umm al-Ma'arik Championship, Al-Karkh reached 4th place in the 1993–94 season.

In 1996, they participated in the 102nd edition of the IFA Shield, a competition in India. They finished as runners-up, losing 1–0 after extra time to JCT Mills. In the 1996–97 season, Al-Karkh finished in the relegation zone's 14th place at 27 points from 30 matches. The team was relegated to the Iraqi First Division League for the first time since they have replaced Al-Rasheed in 1990. They were promoted back to the Iraqi Premier League in the 1997–98 season. They maintained an average of 7th place throughout the five seasons after promotion. In the 1999–00 Iraq FA Cup, Al-Karkh reached the semifinals after beating Al-Talaba and Samarra FC, but they lost to Al-Quwa Al-Jawiya 1–0 in both the first and second legs. The team also reached the semifinals in the 9th Umm al-Ma'arik Championship, where they were beaten by Al-Quwa Al-Jawiya. They won the third place match. A season after, Al-Karkh achieved the Umm al-Ma'arik Championship 3rd place again.

In the 2003–04 season, after Sharar Haidar was appointed as the new president of the club, Al-Karkh didn't qualify for the second phase while in the season after, the team only qualified to the second phase. They participated in the Arab Istiqlal Championship in 2005 but were knocked out at the group stage. In the 2005–06 season, Al-Karkh finished in the relegation zone with 12 points out of 12 matches, one point away from Diyala FC that had 13 points, being relegated for the second time to the Iraqi First Division League. The team stayed in the First Division League until the 2009–10 season, where they were among the six clubs that were elected to play the last two Iraqi Premier League places playoff. Under the management of Nasrat Nassir, Al-Karkh won promotion and returned to the Premier League. After two seasons, Al-Karkh was relegated again before returning once again to the Premier League after winning First Division League in the 2012–13 season.

In the 2021–22 season, Al-Karkh won their first Iraq FA Cup title with a 2–1 victory over Al-Kahrabaa in the final.

== Stadium ==
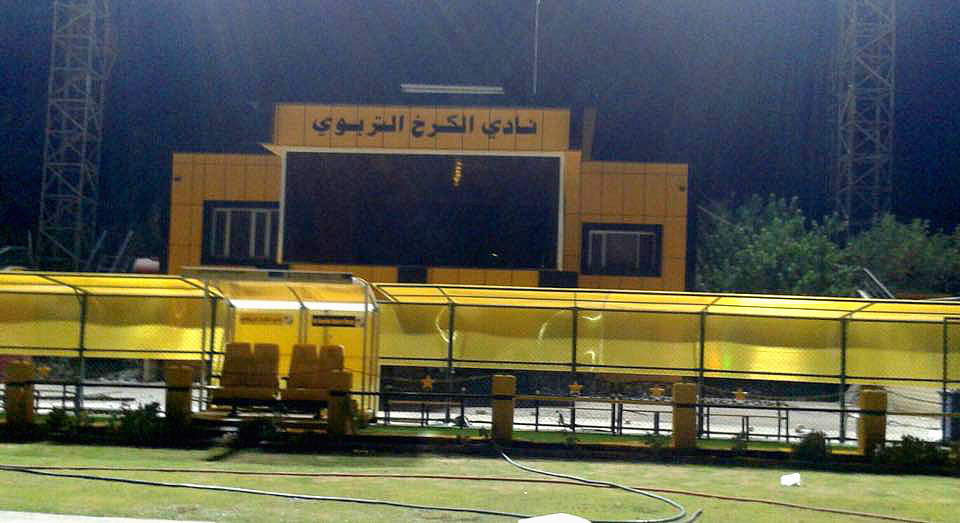
Al-Karkh Stadium at night in 2014

At first, Al-Mansour club took an old building that oversees the Tigris in Al-Karkh and turned it into a basketball court and a place to manage the club. In the late-1960s, the building started to collapse which was the main reason for the club being banished. In 1963, a new club with the same administrative board was formed in Mansour neighbourhood, Mansour district, Karkh after Al-Mansour Local Administration Stadium was built.

In 1984, Al-Rasheed took over the stadium and turned it into theirs after renovating it and allowing shops to be opened around it, and renamed it to Al-Rasheed Stadium. In the dissolving of Al-Rasheed, the stadium was renamed to Al-Karkh Stadium as the stadium of Al-Karkh SC. In June 2020, following the death of former Iraqi and Al-Rasheed player Ahmed Radhi, the stadium was renamed to Al-Saher Ahmed Radhi Stadium. In January 2026, the stadium was renamed again to Captain Sharar Haidar Stadium. It is named after the club's former president Sharar Haidar who died in 2023.

== Statistics ==
=== Recent seasons ===
The season-by-season performance of the club over the recent years:

Season	League	Rank	P	W	D	L	F	A	GD	Pts	Cup
2000–01	Iraqi Elite League	7	30	14	8	8	48	34	14	50	—
2001–02	Iraqi Elite League	8	38	15	9	14	52	42	10	54	QF
2002–03	Iraqi First Division League^{(1)}	—	27	9	10	8	29	21	8	37	R32
2003–04	Iraqi Premier League^{(1)}	—	8	4	1	3	12	11	1	13	—
2004–05	Iraqi Premier League	3 – Group 2	19	8	4	7	20	14	6	28	—
2005–06	Iraqi Premier League	6 – Group 3	12	3	3	6	9	14	−5	12	—
2006–07	Iraqi First Division League										—
2007–08	Iraqi First Division League										—
2008–09	Iraqi First Division League	1 – Promotion Round	5	4	1	0	7	2	5	13	—
2009–10	Iraqi Premier League	11 – Group B	34	9	14	10	31	35	−4	41	—
2010–11	Iraqi Elite League	5 – Group A	26	10	11	5	35	27	8	41	—
2011–12	Iraqi Elite League	17	38	8	10	20	32	49	−17	34	—
2012–13	Iraqi First Division League	1	30	20	7	3	62	24	38	67	R32
2013–14	Iraqi Premier League	12	22	7	4	11	20	25	−5	25	—
2014–15	Iraqi Premier League	5 – Group 1	18	7	5	6	20	18	2	26	—
2015–16	Iraqi Premier League	8 – Group 1	17	2	6	9	11	20	−9	12	QF
2016–17	Iraqi Premier League	19	36	3	11	22	24	65	−41	20	R32
2017–18	Iraqi First Division League	1									—
2018–19	Iraqi Premier League	6	38	15	12	11	44	35	+9	57	R16
2019–20	Iraqi Premier League	Withdrew	3	1	1	1	5	7	−2	4	R32
2020–21	Iraqi Premier League	10	38	11	12	15	35	40	−5	45	SF
2021–22	Iraqi Premier League	14	38	8	19	11	32	36	−4	43	Won
2022–23	Iraqi Premier League	12	38	13	12	13	40	36	+4	51	SF
2023–24	Iraq Stars League	15	38	7	18	13	36	45	−9	39	R16
2024–25	Iraq Stars League	15	38	12	10	16	40	49	−9	46	1R
2025–26	Iraq Stars League	7	38	16	12	10	51	41	+10	60	R16^{(2)}

As of 2 June 2026. Rank = Rank in the league; P = Played; W = Win; D = Draw; L = Loss; F = Goals for; A = Goals against; GD = Goal difference; Pts = Points; Cup = Iraq FA Cup.
in = Still in competition; — = Not attended; 1R = 1st round; 2R = 2nd round; 3R = 3rd round; R16 = Round of sixteen; QF = Quarterfinals; SF = Semifinals.

^{1} The league was not completed and was cancelled.
^{2} Al-Karkh had not yet been eliminated from the cup but it was abandoned midway through.

== Players ==
=== First-team squad ===
As of 16 September 2026

Note: Flags indicate national team as defined under FIFA eligibility rules; some limited exceptions apply. Players may hold more than one non-FIFA nationality.

No.	Pos.	Nation	Player
4	DF	IRQ	Omar Noori
5	DF	IRQ	Yousef Samer
7	DF	IRQ	Mustafa Irmayyidh
8	MF	IRQ	Hayder Salim
9	FW	CIV	Mamadou Soro
11	MF	IRQ	Mushab Jamal
12	GK	IRQ	Mohammed Shakir
13	FW	IRQ	Hamzah Al-Balahi
14	FW	IRQ	Suhaib Raad
16	DF	IRQ	Mashkor Kareem
17	MF	IRQ	Ameer Salim
18	FW	IRQ	Haidar Ali
19	MF	IRQ	Mohammed Abdulrahman
20	MF	BFA	Eliseé Sou

No.	Pos.	Nation	Player
22	GK	IRQ	Jaafer Shenaishil
24	DF	CIV	Naude Zeguei
25	DF	IRQ	Mohammed Mustafa
26	FW	IRQ	Sajjad Alaa
27	MF	IRQ	Ameer Hassan
29	FW	IRQ	Haider Hussein
30	MF	IRQ	Omar Ibrahim
37	DF	IRQ	Muamal Rashed
40	DF	IRQ	Moussa Alaa
42	DF	IRQ	Abbas Yas
44	GK	IRQ	Mohsin Sami
55	MF	IRQ	Mahdi Abbas
80	MF	CIV	Yannick Zakri
91	MF	MLI	Ibrahima Tandia

=== Reserves team squad ===
As of 17 April 2023

Note: Flags indicate national team as defined under FIFA eligibility rules; some limited exceptions apply. Players may hold more than one non-FIFA nationality.

No.	Pos.	Nation	Player
1	GK	IRQ	Laith Faez
2		IRQ	Abbas Kareem
3		IRQ	Khattab Rasheed
4		IRQ	Moammel Thamer
5		IRQ	Zainulabdeen Abid
6		IRQ	Ali Hatem
7		IRQ	Ahmed Falih Badeer
8		IRQ	Hussein Abdulsamed
9		IRQ	Mahdi Mohammed
10		IRQ	Hussein Hayder
11		IRQ	Hayder Qasim
12	GK	IRQ	Hussein Badeea
15		IRQ	Ali Kadhim
17		IRQ	Rashid Fawaz

No.	Pos.	Nation	Player
18		IRQ	Aqeel Ali
19		IRQ	Sajjad Hassan
21	GK	IRQ	Mohammed Basim
22		IRQ	Ahmed Qasim
23		IRQ	Jaafer Omar
25		IRQ	Hussein Ahmed
27		IRQ	Sajjad Kadhim
28		IRQ	Hussein Abbas
29		IRQ	Khudhur Raheem
33		IRQ	Muqtada Al-Sadr Sameer
35		IRQ	Ali Jawad Kadhim
88		IRQ	Zaid Qahtan
90		IRQ	Ali Jaber Shawy
99		IRQ	Mohammed Qasim

=== Youth team squad ===
As of 9 March 2023

Note: Flags indicate national team as defined under FIFA eligibility rules; some limited exceptions apply. Players may hold more than one non-FIFA nationality.

No.	Pos.	Nation	Player
1	GK	IRQ	Mukarram Jawad
2		IRQ	Mohammed Ibrahim
3		IRQ	Ruq Jabbar
6		IRQ	Amir Rashid
8		IRQ	Ridha Abdul-Kadhim
9		IRQ	Abdul-Moez Sahy
11		IRQ	Hassan Anas
12	GK	IRQ	Mohammed Jassim
13		IRQ	Mohammed Ahmed
15		IRQ	Muntadher Subhi
17		IRQ	Karam Albarri
20	GK	IRQ	Safaa Alaa
21		IRQ	Hassan Hameed
24		IRQ	Youssef Ibrahim
27		IRQ	Murtadha Raji
28		IRQ	Alhassan Aiser

No.	Pos.	Nation	Player
30		IRQ	Abdulkhaliq Mohammed
42		IRQ	Mohammed Basim
—		IRQ	Abdulwahhab Salah
—		IRQ	Muslim Ghassan
—		IRQ	Al-Abbas Alaa
—		IRQ	Hussein Ali
—		IRQ	Khalid Ali
—		IRQ	Moammel Jawad
—		IRQ	Ibrahim Abdul-Wahid
—		IRQ	Ali Ahmed
—		IRQ	Ali Hassan
—		IRQ	Yaseen Raed
—		IRQ	Mohammed Wathiq
—		IRQ	Hassanin Adel
—		IRQ	Mustafa Mahmoud
—		IRQ	Ali Mohammed

== Personnel ==
=== Current technical staff ===
Position	Name	Nationality
Manager:	Ahmed Abdul-Jabar	(Iraq)
Assistant manager:	Bahaa Kadhim	(Iraq)
Goalkeeping coach:	Abdul-Karim Naim	(Iraq)
Reserves team coach:	Dhafer Turky	(Iraq)
Reserves team assistant coach:	Yaser Yahya Alwan	(Iraq)
Reserves team goalkeeping coach:	Yaser Abdulkareem Abbood Fayouri	(Iraq)
Reserves team fitness coach:	Sarmad Rasheed Hameed	(Iraq)
Youth team coach:	Abbas Hassan	(Iraq)
Youth team assistant coach:	Ibrahim Jari	(Iraq)
Youth team assistant coach:	Ashraf Akram Jebur	(Iraq)
Youth team goalkeeping coach:	Ahmed Ali Daeer	(Iraq)
Youth team fitness coach:	Hadeer Aabed Sadiq	(Iraq)
Youth team supervisor:	Nabeel Saedi	(Iraq)
Youth team administrative manager:	Ali Nima Lazim	(Iraq)
Youth team media coordinator:	Ameen Shirad	(Iraq)
Director of football:	Taleb Menshed	(Iraq)
Technical Advisor:	Thair Ahmed	(Iraq)
Club doctor:	Majed Khazal	(Iraq)

Updated to match played 13 May 2023
Source: almirbad.com

=== Board members ===
Office	Name
President	Sharar Haidar

== Managerial history ==
- (Iraq) Karim Salman (2017–2020)
- (Iraq) Ahmad Abdul-Jabar (2020–2021)
- (Iraq) Razzaq Farhan (2021)
- (Iraq) Hassan Ahmad (2021–present)

== Honours ==
=== Domestic ===
- Iraqi Premier Division League (second tier)
  - Winners (2): 2012–13, 2017–18
- Iraq FA Cup
  - Winners (1): 2021–22
- Iraqi Super Cup
  - Runners-up (1): 2022

=== Invitational ===
- IFA Shield (IFA)
  - Runners-up (1): 1996

== Other sports ==
=== Basketball ===
- Iraqi Basketball Premier League:
  - Champions (13): 1980–81, 1981–82, 1982–83, 1984–85, 1990–91, 1991–92, 1996–97, 1999–2000, 2000–01, 2001–02, 2004–05, 2007–08, 2015–16
