= List of Iraq international footballers =

This is a list of Iraq international footballers, comprising players to have represented the Iraq national football team since its formation in 1957.

Key
§	Named to the national team in the past year

As of 29 September 2026 after the match against Saudi Arabia

Name	Caps	Goals	First cap	Opponent	Last cap	Opponent	Debut under
Rahim Karim	21	0	11 November 1969	Egypt	25 December 1977	Morocco	(Soviet Union) Yuri Illichev
Falah Hassan	103	29	22 July 1970	Poland	14 March 1986	Romania	(Soviet Union) Yuri Illichev
Jalil Hanoon	37	7	21 August 1973	South Yemen	28 March 1980	South Yemen	(Iraq) Thamir Muhsin
Hassan Farhan	101	2	22 February 1974	Morocco	29 March 1982	United Arab Emirates	(Iraq) Wathiq Naji
Hadi Ahmed	65	10	2 April 1975	Qatar	26 March 1982	Qatar	(Scotland) Danny McLennan
Jamal Ali	19	0	22 June 1980	Poland	17 March 1986	Romania	(Iraq) Anwar Jassam
Raad Hammoudi	104	0	8 February 1976	Turkey	21 February 1987	Kuwait	(Scotland) Danny McLennan
Hussein Saeed	137	78	5 September 1976	Saudi Arabia	3 March 1990	United Arab Emirates	(Socialist Federal Republic of Yugoslavia) Lenko Grčić
Fatah Nsaief	52	0	23 February 1978	Algeria	1 May 1987	United Arab Emirates	(Socialist Federal Republic of Yugoslavia) Lenko Grčić
Nadhim Shaker	57	3	1978		11 June 1986	Mexico	
Adnan Dirjal	116	8	11 December 1978	Qatar	3 March 1990	United Arab Emirates	(Iraq) Ammo Baba
Haris Mohammed	90	7	1979		18 March 1988	Bahrain	
Karim Allawi	91	11	6 February 1981	Jordan	3 March 1990	United Arab Emirates	(Socialist Federal Republic of Yugoslavia) Vojo Gardašević
Basil Gorgis	49	4	21 February 1982	Jordan	10 February 1989	Qatar	(Iraq) Ammo Baba
Ali Hussein Shihab	71	12	22 August 1981	Guinea	10 February 1989	Qatar	(Iraq) Ammo Baba
Khalil Allawi	81	2	10 September 1981	Thailand	10 February 1989	Qatar	(Iraq) Ammo Baba
Natiq Hashim	97	12	6 February 1981	Jordan	3 March 1990	United Arab Emirates	(Socialist Federal Republic of Yugoslavia) Vojo Gardašević
Samir Shaker	32	3	21 February 1981	Jordan	21 July 1988	Syria	(Socialist Federal Republic of Yugoslavia) Vojo Gardašević
Ahmed Radhi	121	62	21 February 1982	Jordan	20 June 1997	Pakistan	(Iraq) Ammo Baba
Shaker Mahmoud	28	4	9 September 1983	Bahrain	11 June 1986	Mexico	(Iraq) Ammo Baba
Karim Saddam	20	6	28 April 1983	Egypt	11 June 1986	Mexico	(Iraq) Ammo Baba
Rahim Hameed	12	6	24 March 1986	United Arab Emirates	9 July 1988	Tunisia	(Brazil) Zé Mário
Maad Ibrahim	16	0	31 January 1986	Denmark	16 July 1990	China	(Brazil) Edu
Ismail Mohammed Sharif	27	2	17 March 1986	Romania	16 July 1990	China	(Brazil) Zé Mário
Anad Abid	11	0	15 June 1985	South Korea	11 June 1986	Mexico	(Iraq) Akram Salman
Basim Qasim	18	0	12 July 1985	Bahrain	1 August 1988	Qatar	(Iraq) Anwar Jassam
Ahmad Jassim	31	0	17 March 1986	Romania	16 July 1990	China	(Brazil) Zé Mário
Ghanim Oraibi	60	0	20 September 1985	United Arab Emirates	10 February 1989	Qatar	(Brazil) Jorge Vieira
Laith Hussein	80	21	24 March 1986	United Arab Emirates	13 January 2002	Qatar	(Brazil) Zé Mário
Radhi Shenaishil	80	6	19 July 1988	Jordan	31 August 1999	Jordan	(Iraq) Ammo Baba
Emad Hashim	75	0	15 October 1989	Kuwait	31 August 2001	Iran	(Iraq) Anwar Jassam
Samir Kadhim	35	1	15 October 1989	Kuwait	18 November 1998	Lebanon	(Iraq) Anwar Jassam
Omar Ahmed Tawfiq	3	0	15 October 1989	Kuwait	20 June 1993	China	(Iraq) Anwar Jassam
Sabah Jeayer	21	4	18 August 1992	Ethiopia	16 April 2001	Kazakhstan	(Iraq) Adnan Dirjal
Jabbar Hashim	30	2	25 April 1993	South Korea	31 August 2001	Iran	(Iraq) Adnan Dirjal
Abbas Obeid	21	7	12 March 1995	India	31 August 2001	Iran	(Iraq) Anwar Jassam
Sadiq Saadoun	8	1	12 March 1995	India	23 August 2001	Bahrain	(Iraq) Anwar Jassam
Hussam Fawzi	44	17	14 March 1995	Thailand	25 June 2004	Jordan	(Iraq) Anwar Jassam
Haidar Mahmoud	54	7	5 December 1996	Iran	13 December 2004	Qatar	(Iraq) Yahya Alwan
Husham Mohammed	35	18	17 November 1998	Lebanon	13 January 2002	Qatar	(Iraq) Akram Salman
Abdul-Wahab Abu Al-Hail	67	8	30 March 1997	China	8 June 2009	Poland	(Iraq) Yahya Alwan
Jassim Swadi	21	4	17 November 1998	Lebanon	13 February 2006	Oman	(Iraq) Akram Salman
Razzaq Farhan	60	24	17 November 1998	Lebanon	22 February 2006	Singapore	(Iraq) Akram Salman
Ahmad Abdul-Jabar	27	0	17 November 1998	Lebanon	10 July 2009	Palestine	(Iraq) Akram Salman
Hashim Khamis	9	0	7 August 1999	Kyrgyzstan	19 July 2002	Syria	(Iraq) Najih Humoud
Ziyad Tariq	12	1	23 May 2000	Lebanon	13 January 2002	Qatar	(Iraq) Najih Humoud
Amer Abdul Wahab	14	0	23 May 2000	Lebanon	23 August 2001	Bahrain	(Iraq) Adnan Hamad
Hamza Hadi	19	2	23 May 2000	Lebanon	24 October 2000	Japan	(Iraq) Adnan Hamad
Emad Mohammed	103	27	31 January 2001	Lebanon	27 May 2012	Botswana	(Iraq) Adnan Hamad
Haidar Abdul-Razzaq	24	0	31 January 2001	Lebanon	2 July 2007	Uzbekistan	(Iraq) Adnan Hamad
Jassim Ghulam	24	1	23 April 2001	Nepal	7 January 2009	Oman	(Iraq) Adnan Hamad
Ahmed Ali Jaber	14	0	17 August 2001	Thailand	16 October 2007	Qatar	(Iraq) Adnan Hamad
Hawar Mulla Mohammed	113	20	31 August 2001	Saudi Arabia	12 June 2012	Oman	(Iraq) Adnan Hamad
Bassim Abbas	90	1	14 September 2001	Qatar	11 October 2012	Brazil	(Croatia) Rudolf Belin
Nashat Akram	113	17	5 October 2001	Saudi Arabia	4 June 2013	Oman	(Croatia) Rudolf Belin
Mahdi Karim	110	12	12 October 2001	Iran	28 February 2018	Saudi Arabia	(Croatia) Rudolf Belin
Younis Mahmoud	148	57	19 July 2002	Syria	29 March 2016	Vietnam	(Iraq) Adnan Hamad
Noor Sabri	100	0	22 July 2002	Syria	27 March 2018	Syria	(Iraq) Adnan Hamad
Ahmad Mnajed	36	10	20 November 2002	Qatar	1 October 2010	Iran	(Germany) Bernd Stange
Uday Taleb	5	0	23 November 2002	Bahrain	8 September 2004	Chinese Taipei	(Germany) Bernd Stange
Luay Salah	23	4	23 November 2002	Bahrain	29 February 2012	Singapore	(Germany) Bernd Stange
Qusay Munir	87	6	12 December 2003	Bahrain	15 October 2013	Saudi Arabia	(Germany) Bernd Stange
Salih Sadir	61	7	20 December 2002	Qatar	16 December 2011	Qatar	(Germany) Bernd Stange
Haitham Kadhim	38	0	13 August 2003	Iran	3 January 2009	Bahrain	(Germany) Bernd Stange
Haidar Abdul-Amir	50	2	21 June 2004	Jordan	18 December 2010	Syria	(Iraq) Adnan Hamad
Haidar Sabah	2	0	18 July 2004	Uzbekistan	27 May 2013	Liberia	(Iraq) Adnan Hamad
Saad Attiya	16	1	8 September 2004	Chinese Taipei	18 December 2010	Syria	(Iraq) Adnan Hamad
Yassir Raad	29	0	23 December 2002	Bahrain	1 October 2010	Iran	(Germany) Bernd Stange
Sarmad Rasheed	2	0	26 March 2005	Australia	25 July 2006	Syria	(Iraq) Akram Salman
Mohammed Nasser	19	6	26 March 2005	Australia	27 December 2008	United Arab Emirates	(Iraq) Akram Salman
Muayad Khalid	4	0	26 March 2005	Australia	17 June 2009	Spain	(Iraq) Akram Salman
Wissam Zaki	14	0	26 March 2005	Australia	15 November 2006	China	(Iraq) Akram Salman
Safwan Abdul-Ghani	7	0	26 March 2005	Australia	28 March 2009	South Korea	(Iraq) Akram Salman
Ali Hussein Rehema	113	2	8 June 2005	Jordan	29 March 2016	Vietnam	(Iraq) Akram Salman
Wissam Gassid	3	0	8 June 2005	Jordan	13 August 2005	Cyprus	(Iraq) Akram Salman
Khalid Mushir	24	0	7 August 2005	Bahrain	1 October 2010	Iran	(Iraq) Akram Salman
Nawaf Falah	5	0	13 August 2005	Cyprus	9 August 2006	Syria	(Iraq) Akram Salman
Samal Saeed	69	2	26 November 2005	Kuwait	21 August 2016	North Korea	(Iraq) Akram Salman
Wissam Kadhim	1	0	15 March 2006	Saudi Arabia	15 March 2006	Saudi Arabia	(Iraq) Akram Salman
Sarhang Muhsin	5	0	15 July 2006	Syria	4 October 2006	Iran	(Iraq) Akram Salman
Alaa Abdul-Hussein	4	0	15 July 2006	Syria	6 September 2006	Palestine	(Iraq) Akram Salman
Khaldoun Ibrahim	34	0	8 June 2007	Jordan	18 June 2013	Australia	(Brazil) Jorvan Vieira
Ali Abbas	12	0	8 June 2007	Jordan	6 September 2016	Saudi Arabia	(Brazil) Jorvan Vieira
Mohammed Gassid	69	0	8 June 2007	Jordan	24 December 2018	China	(Brazil) Jorvan Vieira
Halgurd Mulla Mohammed	9	0	8 June 2007	Jordan	14 August 2013	Chile	(Brazil) Jorvan Vieira
Ahmed Abid Ali	17	0	8 June 2007	Jordan	10 January 2009	Kuwait	(Brazil) Jorvan Vieira
Mohammed Ali Karim	25	0	12 June 2007	Jordan	16 December 2011	Qatar	(Brazil) Jorvan Vieira
Alaa Abdul-Zahra	126	17	8 June 2007	Jordan	11 November 2021	Syria	(Brazil) Jorvan Vieira
Karrar Jassim	64	6	8 June 2007	Jordan	17 November 2015	Chinese Taipei	(Brazil) Jorvan Vieira
Nabeel Abbas	2	0	28 October 2007	Pakistan	24 January 2008	Jordan	(Norway) Egil Olsen
Mustafa Karim	48	7	24 January 2008	Jordan	4 June 2013	Oman	(Norway) Egil Olsen
Salam Shaker	93	4	24 January 2008	Jordan	29 March 2016	Vietnam	(Norway) Egil Olsen
Samer Saeed	25	0	24 January 2008	Jordan	11 November 2011	China	(Norway) Egil Olsen
Ali Salah	7	0	17 May 2008	Syria	3 July 2012	Morocco	(Iraq) Adnan Hamad
Ous Ibrahim	9	0	7 January 2009	Oman	11 November 2010	India	(Brazil) Jorvan Vieira
Jabir Shakir	1	1	22 March 2009	Saudi Arabia	22 March 2009	Saudi Arabia	(Iraq) Radhi Shenaishil
Muslim Mubarak	2	0	22 March 2009	Saudi Arabia	28 March 2009	South Korea	(Iraq) Radhi Shenaishil
Amjad Kalaf	28	1	22 March 2009	Saudi Arabia	1 June 2017	Jordan	(Iraq) Radhi Shenaishil
Herdi Noor Al-Deen	2	0	22 March 2009	Saudi Arabia	28 March 2009	South Korea	(Iraq) Radhi Shenaishil
Hussein Abdul-Wahid Waham	7	0	22 March 2009	Saudi Arabia	8 August 2016	Qatar	(Iraq) Radhi Shenaishil
Ahmed Ayad	15	0	22 March 2009	Saudi Arabia	28 December 2010	Saudi Arabia	(Iraq) Radhi Shenaishil
Nadim Karim	1	0	28 March 2009	South Korea	28 March 2009	South Korea	(Iraq) Radhi Shenaishil
Essam Yassin	2	0	31 May 2009	Qatar	8 August 2016	Qatar	(Serbia) Bora Milutinović
Alaa Gatea	1	0	13 July 2009	Palestine	13 July 2009	Palestine	(Iraq) Nadhim Shaker
Muthana Khalid	40	0	15 November 2009	Azerbaijan	19 November 2013	Indonesia	(Iraq) Nadhim Shaker
Mohammed Qabel	3	0	18 November 2009	United Arab Emirates	14 October 2014	Yemen	(Iraq) Nadhim Shaker
Amjad Radhi	35	2	16 September 2010	Jordan	11 June 2015	Japan	(Germany) Wolfgang Sidka
Mohammed Abdul-Zahra	2	1	16 September 2010	Jordan	29 May 2021	Nepal	(Germany) Wolfgang Sidka
Ali Mutashar	4	0	21 September 2010	Oman	22 December 2010	Syria	(Germany) Wolfgang Sidka
Saad Abdul-Amir	86	4	21 September 2010	Oman	19 November 2024	Oman	(Germany) Wolfgang Sidka
Mustafa Ahmad	1	0	21 September 2010	Oman	21 September 2010	Oman	(Germany) Wolfgang Sidka
Ahmed Ibrahim	118	5	11 November 2010	India	29 March 2022	Syria	(Germany) Wolfgang Sidka
Ammar Gaiym	1	0	11 November 2010	India	11 November 2010	India	(Germany) Wolfgang Sidka
Haidar Raad	1	0	28 December 2010	Saudi Arabia	28 December 2010	Saudi Arabia	(Germany) Wolfgang Sidka
Mohammed Jabbar Rubat	4	0	26 March 2011	Kuwait	19 November 2013	Indonesia	(Germany) Wolfgang Sidka
Jalal Hassan	104	0	16 June 2011	Jordan	26 June 2026	Senegal	(Germany) Wolfgang Sidka
Osama Rashid	43	2	13 July 2011	Kuwait	7 September 2025	Thailand	(Germany) Wolfgang Sidka
Hussam Kadhim	24	0	11 October 2011	China	26 March 2019	Jordan	(Brazil) Zico
Ibrahim Kamil	5	0	17 April 2012	Egypt	27 June 2012	Sudan	(Brazil) Zico
Hammadi Ahmad	42	6	17 April 2012	Egypt	7 June 2017	South Korea	(Brazil) Zico
Waleed Bahar	6	0	17 April 2012	Egypt	3 July 2012	Morocco	(Brazil) Zico
Abbas Rehema	2	0	23 May 2012	Sierra Leone	3 July 2012	Morocco	(Brazil) Zico
Ahmed Yasin	71	6	24 June 2012	Lebanon	25 December 2024	Bahrain	(Brazil) Zico
Ali Bahjat	37	0	11 September 2012	Japan	2 January 2018	United Arab Emirates	(Brazil) Zico
Waleed Salem	49	1	11 September 2012	Japan	8 January 2019	Vietnam	(Brazil) Zico
Hussam Ibrahim	8	0	7 November 2012	Qatar	18 January 2013	United Arab Emirates	(Brazil) Zico
Nabeel Sabah	11	0	7 November 2012	Qatar	23 December 2017	Bahrain	(Brazil) Zico
Saif Salman	37	0	3 December 2012	Bahrain	11 June 2015	Japan	(Iraq) Hakim Shaker
Ali Adnan	96	7	3 December 2012	Bahrain	28 December 2024	Saudi Arabia	(Iraq) Hakim Shaker
Yassir Abdul-Mohsen	1	0	3 December 2012	Bahrain	3 December 2012	Bahrain	(Iraq) Hakim Shaker
Ammar Abdul-Hussein	2	0	3 December 2012	Bahrain	13 December 2012	Syria	(Iraq) Hakim Shaker
Mohannad Abdul-Raheem	50	11	30 December 2012	Tunisia	29 March 2022	Syria	(Iraq) Hakim Shaker
Humam Tariq	77	3	30 December 2012	Tunisia	16 June 2023	Colombia	(Iraq) Hakim Shaker
Ahmad Abbas	5	0	12 January 2013	Yemen	21 February 2014	North Korea	(Iraq) Hakim Shaker
Dhurgham Ismail	71	4	12 January 2013	Yemen	21 March 2024	Philippines	(Iraq) Hakim Shaker
Mustafa Nadhim	43	5	1 February 2013	Malaysia	16 June 2023	Colombia	(Iraq) Hakim Shaker
Ahmad Fadhel	9	0	26 March 2013	Syria	6 December 2021	Qatar	(Serbia) Vladimir Petrović
Osama Ali	3	0	27 May 2013	Liberia	14 August 2013	Chile	(Serbia) Vladimir Petrović
Ali Faez	54	4	14 August 2013	Chile	10 June 2025	Jordan	(Serbia) Vladimir Petrović
Mahdi Kamil	52	3	14 August 2013	Chile	5 September 2019	Bahrain	(Serbia) Vladimir Petrović
Ali Qasim Mshari	1	0	14 August 2013	Chile	14 August 2013	Chile	(Serbia) Vladimir Petrović
Mohammed Hameed	37	0	1 February 2013	Malaysia	18 March 2022	Zambia	(Iraq) Hakim Shaker
Mohannad Qasim	1	0	11 November 2013	Syria	11 November 2013	Syria	(Iraq) Hakim Shaker
Jawad Kadhim	1	0	11 November 2013	Syria	11 November 2013	Syria	(Iraq) Hakim Shaker
Ali Husni	28	3	21 February 2014	North Korea	18 March 2022	Zambia	(Iraq) Hakim Shaker
Marwan Hussein	11	0	21 February 2014	North Korea	11 June 2015	Japan	(Iraq) Hakim Shaker
Yaser Kasim	21	3	5 March 2014	China	6 December 2021	Qatar	(Iraq) Hakim Shaker
Bashar Rasan	65	4	4 September 2014	Peru	11 October 2025	Indonesia	(Iraq) Hakim Shaker
Farhan Shakor	1	0	4 September 2014	Peru	4 September 2014	Peru	(Iraq) Hakim Shaker
Sameh Saeed	17	0	4 September 2014	Peru	1 February 2022	Lebanon	(Iraq) Hakim Shaker
Hussein Abdul-Wahid Khalaf	2	0	4 September 2014	Peru	24 July 2016	Uzbekistan	(Iraq) Hakim Shaker
Hawbir Mustafa	1	0	10 October 2014	Yemen	10 October 2014	Yemen	(Iraq) Hakim Shaker
Hussein Ali Wahid	3	1	10 October 2014	Yemen	11 June 2015	Japan	(Iraq) Hakim Shaker
Mustafa Jawda	1	0	14 October 2014	Bahrain	14 October 2014	Bahrain	(Iraq) Hakim Shaker
Justin Meram	36	4	14 November 2014	Kuwait	29 March 2022	Syria	(Iraq) Hakim Shaker
Abdul-Qadir Tariq	1	0	25 December 2014	Uzbekistan	25 December 2014	Uzbekistan	(Iraq) Radhi Shenaishil
Arjan Mustafa	1	0	31 March 2015	(Democratic Republic of the Congo) DR Congo	31 March 2015	(Democratic Republic of the Congo) DR Congo	(Iraq) Akram Salman
Rebin Sulaka	58	1	11 June 2015	Japan	26 June 2026	Senegal	(Iraq) Akram Salman
Amjad Waleed	6	0	26 August 2015	Lebanon	6 November 2016	Jordan	(Iraq) Yahya Alwan
Hussein Falah	2	0	26 August 2015	Lebanon	3 October 2015	Jordan	(Iraq) Yahya Alwan
Saad Natiq	44	1	26 August 2015	Lebanon	9 December 2025	Algeria	(Iraq) Yahya Alwan
Ali Qasim Hameed	5	1	26 August 2015	Lebanon	17 November 2015	Chinese Taipei	(Iraq) Yahya Alwan
Ayman Hussein	100	34	26 August 2015	Lebanon	29 September 2026	Saudi Arabia	(Iraq) Yahya Alwan
Hamza Adnan	6	0	3 October 2015	Jordan	26 March 2023	Russia	(Iraq) Yahya Alwan
Safa Jabbar	1	0	3 October 2015	Jordan	3 October 2015	Jordan	(Iraq) Yahya Alwan
Faisal Jassim	6	0	3 October 2015	Jordan	24 May 2021	Tajikistan	(Iraq) Yahya Alwan
Herdi Siamand	1	0	18 March 2016	Syria	18 March 2016	Syria	(Iraq) Yahya Alwan
Amjad Attwan	91	5	18 March 2016	Syria	12 December 2025	Jordan	(Iraq) Yahya Alwan
Bayar Abubakir	1	1	24 July 2016	Uzbekistan	24 July 2016	Uzbekistan	(Iraq) Radhi Shenaishil
jassimAli Lateef	3	0	24 July 2016	Uzbekistan	21 August 2016	North Korea	(Iraq) Radhi Shenaishil
Karrar Mohammed	3	0	24 July 2016	Uzbekistan	28 February 2018	Saudi Arabia	(Iraq) Radhi Shenaishil
Abbas Qasim	3	0	24 July 2016	Uzbekistan	24 March 2022	United Arab Emirates	(Iraq) Radhi Shenaishil
Wesam Malik	1	0	24 July 2016	Uzbekistan	24 July 2016	Uzbekistan	(Iraq) Radhi Shenaishil
Miran Khesro	2	0	24 July 2016	Uzbekistan	8 August 2016	Qatar	(Iraq) Radhi Shenaishil
Jassim Mohammed	5	1	24 July 2016	Uzbekistan	6 November 2016	Jordan	(Iraq) Radhi Shenaishil
Mazin Fayyadh	14	1	24 July 2016	Uzbekistan	17 November 2020	Uzbekistan	(Iraq) Radhi Shenaishil
Mohammed Jabbar Shokan	9	1	24 July 2016	Uzbekistan	4 August 2018	Palestine	(Iraq) Radhi Shenaishil
Allan Mohideen	3	0	8 August 2016	Qatar	24 January 2024	Vietnam	(Iraq) Radhi Shenaishil
Alaa Mhawi	48	0	21 August 2016	North Korea	12 October 2021	United Arab Emirates	(Iraq) Radhi Shenaishil
Brwa Nouri	9	1	6 November 2016	Jordan	20 November 2018	Bolivia	(Iraq) Radhi Shenaishil
Fahad Talib	21	0	1 June 2017	Jordan	29 May 2026	Andorra	(Iraq) Basim Qasim
Ahmed Abdul-Ridha	4	0	7 June 2017	South Korea	24 December 2018	China	(Iraq) Basim Qasim
Hussein Ali Al-Saedi	53	6	26 August 2017	Syria	9 December 2025	Algeria	(Iraq) Basim Qasim
Ahmed Jalal	3	0	26 August 2017	Syria	26 March 2019	Jordan	(Iraq) Basim Qasim
Sajad Hussein	1	0	13 November 2017	Syria	13 November 2017	Syria	(Iraq) Basim Qasim
Mohanad Ali	73	27	17 December 2017	United Arab Emirates	16 June 2026	Norway	(Iraq) Basim Qasim
Mustafa Mohammed	16	0	28 February 2018	Saudi Arabia	24 March 2022	United Arab Emirates	(Iraq) Basim Qasim
Emad Mohsin	2	1	28 February 2018	Saudi Arabia	27 March 2018	Syria	(Iraq) Basim Qasim
Raad Fanar	3	1	8 May 2018	Palestine	15 October 2018	Saudi Arabia	(Iraq) Basim Qasim
Safaa Hadi	40	1	8 May 2018	Palestine	10 October 2024	Palestine	(Iraq) Basim Qasim
Ibrahim Bayesh	81	8	17 December 2017	United Arab Emirates	29 September 2026	Saudi Arabia	(Iraq) Basim Qasim
Frans Putros	29	0	4 August 2018	Palestine	26 June 2026	Senegal	(Iraq) Basim Qasim
Mohammed Dawood	8	1	15 October 2018	Saudi Arabia	11 June 2021	Hong Kong	(Slovenia) Srečko Katanec
Wissam Saadoun	1	0	20 November 2018	Bolivia	20 November 2018	Bolivia	(Slovenia) Srečko Katanec
Alaa Abbas	27	4	24 December 2018	China	12 January 2023	Yemen	(Slovenia) Srečko Katanec
Maitham Jabbar	25	0	20 March 2019	Syria	29 September 2026	Saudi Arabia	(Slovenia) Srečko Katanec
Karrar Nabeel	11	1	26 March 2019	Jordan	29 September 2026	Saudi Arabia	(Slovenia) Srečko Katanec
Mohammed Qasim	28	3	7 June 2019	Tunisia	26 September 2026	Kuwait	(Slovenia) Srečko Katanec
Uday Shehab	1	0	7 June 2019	Tunisia	7 June 2019	Tunisia	(Slovenia) Srečko Katanec
Najm Shwan	2	0	11 August 2019	Yemen	9 September 2019	Uzbekistan	(Slovenia) Srečko Katanec
Jiloan Hamad	1	0	10 October 2019	Hong Kong	10 October 2019	Hong Kong	(Slovenia) Srečko Katanec
Mohammed Ridha Jalil	6	0	26 November 2019	Qatar	29 May 2021	Nepal	(Slovenia) Srečko Katanec
Hassan Hamoud	2	0	26 November 2019	Qatar	2 December 2019	Yemen	(Slovenia) Srečko Katanec
Sharif Abdul-Kadhim	4	0	26 November 2019	Qatar	12 October 2021	United Arab Emirates	(Slovenia) Srečko Katanec
Hassan Raed	11	0	12 November 2020	Jordan	26 March 2023	Russia	(Slovenia) Srečko Katanec
Mohammed Mezher	2	0	12 November 2020	Jordan	17 November 2020	Uzbekistan	(Slovenia) Srečko Katanec
Sajjad Jassim	14	1	12 January 2021	United Arab Emirates	9 December 2025	Algeria	(Slovenia) Srečko Katanec
Sherko Karim	28	1	12 January 2021	United Arab Emirates	6 December 2025	Sudan	(Slovenia) Srečko Katanec
Mahmoud Khalil	1	0	12 January 2021	United Arab Emirates	12 January 2021	United Arab Emirates	(Slovenia) Srečko Katanec
Murad Mohammed	1	0	27 January 2021	Kuwait	27 January 2021	Kuwait	(Slovenia) Srečko Katanec
Ahmed Abdul-Hussein	4	0	29 March 2021	Uzbekistan	9 November 2022	Mexico	(Slovenia) Srečko Katanec
Mustafa Maan	1	0	29 March 2021	Uzbekistan	29 March 2021	Uzbekistan	(Slovenia) Srečko Katanec
Bassam Shakir	2	0	24 May 2021	Tajikistan	29 May 2021	Nepal	(Slovenia) Srečko Katanec
Amir Al-Ammari	56	3	2 September 2021	South Korea	29 September 2026	Saudi Arabia	(Netherlands) Dick Advocaat
Mohammed Ali Abboud	14	0	2 September 2021	South Korea	19 January 2023	Oman	(Netherlands) Dick Advocaat
Mohanad Jeahze	5	0	11 November 2021	Syria	22 December 2024	Yemen	(Netherlands) Dick Advocaat
Ali Al-Hamadi	23	5	11 November 2021	Syria	26 June 2026	Senegal	(Netherlands) Dick Advocaat
Munaf Younis	35	1	30 November 2021	Oman	26 June 2026	Senegal	(Montenegro) Željko Petrović
Ahmed Farhan	9	0	30 November 2021	Oman	17 October 2023	Jordan	(Montenegro) Željko Petrović
Muntadher Mohammed	2	0	30 November 2021	Oman	6 December 2021	Qatar	(Montenegro) Željko Petrović
Hassan Abdulkareem	23	2	30 November 2021	Oman	29 September 2026	Saudi Arabia	(Montenegro) Željko Petrović
Ali Yousif	8	1	6 December 2021	Qatar	26 June 2026	Senegal	(Montenegro) Željko Petrović
Hussein Jabbar	9	0	21 January 2022	Uganda	19 January 2023	Oman	(Montenegro) Željko Petrović
Zidane Iqbal	31	3	27 January 2022	Iran	29 September 2026	Saudi Arabia	(Montenegro) Željko Petrović
Ruslan Hanoon	1	0	24 March 2022	United Arab Emirates	24 March 2022	United Arab Emirates	(Iraq) Abdul-Ghani Shahad
Merchas Doski	36	1	23 September 2022	Oman	29 September 2026	Saudi Arabia	(Iraq) Radhi Shenaishil
Karrar Amer	3	0	23 September 2022	Oman	12 November 2022	Ecuador	(Iraq) Radhi Shenaishil
Alai Ghasem	9	0	23 September 2022	Oman	25 March 2025	Palestine	(Iraq) Radhi Shenaishil
Aso Rostam	6	1	23 September 2022	Oman	26 March 2023	Russia	(Iraq) Radhi Shenaishil
Shihab Razzaq	2	0	23 September 2022	Oman	12 November 2022	Ecuador	(Iraq) Radhi Shenaishil
Hiran Ahmed	3	0	23 September 2022	Oman	9 November 2022	Mexico	(Iraq) Radhi Shenaishil
Abbas Mohamad	1	0	26 September 2022	Syria	26 September 2022	Syria	(Iraq) Radhi Shenaishil
Zaid Tahseen	32	1	26 September 2022	Syria	26 September 2026	Kuwait	(Iraq) Radhi Shenaishil
Rewan Amin	5	0	26 September 2022	Syria	19 January 2023	Oman	(Iraq) Radhi Shenaishil
Ahmed Zero	1	0	9 November 2022	Mexico	9 November 2022	Mexico	(Iraq) Radhi Shenaishil
Amar Muhsin	8	0	9 November 2022	Mexico	9 December 2025	Algeria	(Iraq) Radhi Shenaishil
Alexander Aoraha	1	0	12 November 2022	Ecuador	12 November 2022	Ecuador	(Iraq) Radhi Shenaishil
Ahmed Basil	21	0	30 December 2022	Kuwait	29 September 2026	Saudi Arabia	(Spain) Jesús Casas
Hussein Ammar	4	0	30 December 2022	Kuwait	26 March 2023	Russia	(Spain) Jesús Casas
Moammel Abdul-Ridha	3	0	30 December 2022	Kuwait	9 January 2023	Saudi Arabia	(Spain) Jesús Casas
Ahmed Yahya	24	0	30 December 2022	Kuwait	29 September 2026	Saudi Arabia	(Spain) Jesús Casas
Louaï El Ani	4	0	26 March 2023	Russia	10 October 2024	Palestine	(Spain) Jesús Casas
Kevin Yakob	10	0	16 June 2023	Colombia	26 June 2026	Senegal	(Spain) Jesús Casas
Pashang Abdulla	3	0	16 June 2023	Colombia	21 November 2023	Vietnam	(Spain) Jesús Casas
Hussein Ali	29	1	7 September 2023	India	22 June 2026	France	(Spain) Jesús Casas
Amin Al-Hamawi	3	0	7 September 2023	India	28 December 2024	Saudi Arabia	(Spain) Jesús Casas
André Alsanati	1	0	7 September 2023	India	7 September 2023	India	(Spain) Jesús Casas
Masies Artien	1	0	10 September 2023	Thailand	10 September 2023	Thailand	(Spain) Jesús Casas
Mustafa Saadoon	20	0	13 October 2023	Qatar	29 September 2026	Saudi Arabia	(Spain) Jesús Casas
Ahmad Allée	4	0	13 October 2023	Qatar	24 January 2024	Vietnam	(Spain) Jesús Casas
Ali Jasim	41	2	13 October 2023	Qatar	29 September 2026	Saudi Arabia	(Spain) Jesús Casas
Danilo Al-Saed	5	0	13 October 2023	Qatar	10 September 2024	Kuwait	(Spain) Jesús Casas
Youssef Amyn	28	2	15 November 2023	Vietnam	22 June 2026	France	(Spain) Jesús Casas
Montader Madjed	4	0	6 January 2024	South Korea	4 September 2025	Hong Kong	(Spain) Jesús Casas
Mohamed Al-Taay	4	0	6 June 2024	Indonesia	25 March 2025	Palestine	(Spain) Jesús Casas
Akam Hashim	18	1	11 June 2024	Vietnam	23 September 2026	Oman	(Spain) Jesús Casas
Lucas Shlimon	4	0	10 October 2024	Palestine	25 March 2025	Palestine	(Spain) Jesús Casas
Marko Farji	14	0	22 December 2024	Yemen	22 June 2026	France	(Spain) Jesús Casas
Peter Gwargis	4	0	22 December 2024	Yemen	29 May 2026	Andorra	(Spain) Jesús Casas
Ahmed Maknzi	8	0	25 December 2024	Bahrain	26 June 2026	Senegal	(Spain) Jesús Casas
Charbel Shamoon	1	0	25 March 2025	Palestine	25 March 2025	Palestine	(Spain) Jesús Casas
Aimar Sher	8	0	10 June 2025	Jordan	22 June 2026	France	(Australia) Graham Arnold
Zaid Ismail	10	0	3 December 2025	Bahrain	29 September 2026	Saudi Arabia	(Australia) Graham Arnold
Mohammed Jawad	3	0	6 December 2025	Sudan	12 December 2025	Jordan	(Australia) Graham Arnold
Ahmed Qasem	8	0	29 May 2026	Andorra	29 September 2026	Saudi Arabia	(Australia) Graham Arnold
Kumel Al-Rekabe	1	0	29 May 2026	Andorra	29 May 2026	Andorra	(Australia) Graham Arnold
Jussef Nasrawe	2	0	29 May 2026	Andorra	26 September 2026	Kuwait	(Australia) Graham Arnold
Dario Naamo	1	0	29 May 2026	Andorra	29 May 2026	Andorra	(Australia) Graham Arnold
Mohammed Dlawar	1	0	23 September 2026	Oman	23 September 2026	Oman	(Australia) Graham Arnold
Saif Rasheed	3	1	23 September 2026	Oman	29 September 2026	Saudi Arabia	(Australia) Graham Arnold
Josef Al-Imam	2	0	26 September 2026	Kuwait	29 September 2026	Saudi Arabia	(Australia) Graham Arnold
Hayder Abdulkareem	1	0	26 September 2026	Kuwait	26 September 2026	Kuwait	(Australia) Graham Arnold
