= List of Iraq national football team managers =

== History ==
=== Jorvan Vieira ===
On 25 May 2007, Jorvan Vieira was appointed as head coach. Under him, Iraq reached the final of the 2007 WAFF Championship and won the 2007 AFC Asian Cup. Vieira resigned after the Asian Cup.

Jorvan Vieira was reappointed in September 2008. After a disappointing 2009 Arabian Gulf Cup, Vieira was sacked.

=== Egil Olsen ===
Egil Olsen was appointed as coach on 17 September 2007. Under him, Iraq advanced to the third round of the 2010 FIFA World Cup qualification, but after a 1–1 draw with China, the FA sacked Olsen and replaced him with Adnan Hamad.

=== Adnan Hamad ===
Hamad was appointed on 27 February 2008 to lead Iraq in the remaining 2010 World Cup qualifiers. Iraq failed to advance to the final round as a 1–0 defeat to Qatar saw them finish in third in the group. Following this, the Iraq FA disbanded the team and sacked Hamad.

=== Bora Milutinović ===
Under Bora, Iraq participated in the 2009 FIFA Confederations Cup, which they qualified for by winning the 2007 AFC Asian Cup. They started the tournament with a 0–0 draw with hosts South Africa, before losing to UEFA Euro 2008 winners Spain by one goal to nil. Iraq drew the last game 0–0 with New Zealand and were knocked out.

=== Nadhim Shaker ===
Nadhim Shaker was appointed as caretaker coach between July and November 2009 and won the 2009 UAE International Cup.

=== Wolfgang Sidka ===
Wolfgang Sidka was appointed coach in August 2010 to lead Iraq in the 2011 AFC Asian Cup. Iraq reached the quarter finals, as they lost 1–0 to Australia. In the 2014 FIFA World Cup qualification, Iraq advanced to the third round but Sidka's contract was not renewed and he was succeeded by Zico in August 2011.

=== Zico ===
Zico signed a contract with Iraq Football Federation on 28 August 2011 and first managed the national team in a match against Jordan on 2 September 2011. He won the group in the third round thus advancing to the final round.

Zico resigned as coach of the Iraqi national team on 27 November 2012 after little more than a year in the post, saying the country's football association had failed to fulfill the terms of his contract. He had 10 wins and six draws in 21 games with Iraq.

=== Hakim Shaker ===
Hakeem Shaker took over as interim coach and lost the finals of both the 2012 WAFF Championship and 2013 Arabian Gulf Cup. He was reappointed in September 2013 and qualified for the 2015 AFC Asian Cup by beating China 3–1. However, Iraq finished bottom of the group in the 2014 Arabian Gulf Cup leading to the sacking of Hakeem Shaker and the appointment of Radhi Shenaishil.

=== Vladimir Petrović ===
In February 2013, Vladimir Petrović was appointed for the remaining World Cup qualifiers, but lost all three matches and Iraq finished bottom of their group. Petrovic was sacked in September 2013.

=== Radhi Shenaishil ===
On 13 December 2014, Radhi Shenaishil was appointed as coach to lead Iraq in the 2015 AFC Asian Cup. Under Radhi, Iraq defeated Iran in the quarter-finals in penalties and finished the 2015 AFC Asian Cup in fourth place, after losing 2–3 to United Arab Emirates in third/fourth place play-off. After the tournament, Shenaishil returned to managing Qatar SC.

On 20 April 2016, Radhi Shenaishil was re-appointed to lead Iraq in the final round. After losing five of their first seven games, Iraq were eliminated and Shenaishil was sacked.

=== Akram Salman ===
Iraq appointed Akram Salman as manager but he was sacked in June 2015 after losing 4–0 to Japan in a friendly match.

=== Yahya Alwan ===
Yahya Alwan was appointed in August 2015. Due to poor performances, Abdul-Ghani Shahad replaced him as interim coach for the final qualifier in March 2016.

=== Abdul-Ghani Shahad ===
Abdul-Ghani Shahad was appointed as caretaker coach and led Iraq to qualification for the 2019 AFC Asian Cup and the final round by beating Vietnam 1–0.

=== Basim Qasim ===
Basim Qasim was appointed in May 2017 to lead Iraq for the remaining qualifiers. He led Iraq to the semifinals of the 23rd Arabian Gulf Cup. The FA decided not to renew his contract in August 2018.

=== Srečko Katanec ===
On 3 September 2018, Srečko Katanec was appointed as head coach on a three-year contract. Under Katanec, Iraq reached the round of 16 of the 2019 AFC Asian Cup as they lost to eventual champions Qatar by one goal.

In August 2019, Iraq finished as runners-up of the 2019 WAFF Championship. He also led Iraq to the semifinals of the 24th Arabian Gulf Cup.

On 16 June 2021, it was rumoured that the Iraqi FA and Katanec are having collision after the former's failure to pay salary for the manager and it was hinted that Katanec might leave the Iraqi team. He ended up resigning less than a week later.

=== Dick Advocaat ===
On 1 August 2021, Dick Advocaat was unveiled as the Iraq manager ahead of the third round of World Cup 2022 qualifiers. However, after 6 qualifiers with 4 draws and 2 losses, Advocaat, along with assistant manager Cor Pot resigned on 21 November 2021 ahead of the 2021 FIFA Arab Cup.

=== Željko Petrović ===
On 21 November 2021, it was announced that Željko Petrović, one of three assistants Advocaat had during his tenure, stayed on to become the caretaker manager which would last until the end of the Arab Cup, with Rahim Hameed, Advocaat's third assistant, to stay on as assistant manager. Despite crashing out of the group stages, he was given a permanent role, but Hameed was sacked. A win, a draw and a loss later, and Petrović was sacked on 2 February 2022.

=== Abdul-Ghani Shahad ===
Abdul-Ghani Shahad was appointed as caretaker manager of the national team for the second time, beating Zambia in a friendly in Baghdad, then taking on the UAE and beating them 1-0 but drawing against Syria. Despite being unbeaten in these three matches, Iraq failed to finish third and advance to the fourth round of qualifiers and the FA decided not to give Shahad the job full time.

=== Radhi Shenaishil ===
While the FA's search for a new manager was ongoing, newly appointed olympic team manager Radhi Shenaishil was made in charge of the national team for the 2022 Jordan International Tournament in September 2022, and then later was in charge of friendly games against Mexico and Ecuador.

=== Jesús Casas ===
On 5 November 2022, the FA confirmed that Jesús Casas would take charge of the national team for four years on an annual payment of $1m split into monthly wages. Radhi Shenaishil would lead the national team for the Mexico and Ecuador games in Spain, while he would take charge of the games against Costa Rica and Venezuela in Iraq, with his first came coming on 17 November 2022. Those two games were cancelled, so the national team played an intra-squad friendly under Casas’ view. His first official match came on 30 December 2022 against Kuwait at the Al-Minaa Olympic Stadium as a warm up game for the 25th Arabian Gulf Cup in Basra, then managed his first competitive match against Oman on 6 January 2023 at the aforementioned tournament.

On 15 April 2025, following Iraq's defeat to Palestine in the third round of 2026 FIFA World Cup qualifiers, Casas was relieved of his duties as head coach.

== List of managers ==
The team has had 41 different coaches, of whom 21 have been from Iraq.

- Only record the results that affect the FIFA/Coca-Cola World Ranking. See FIFA 'A' matches criteria.

As of 17 November 2026

Managers
Name	From	To	Tenure	P	W	D	L	Win %	Major Tournaments and Achievements
(Romania) Cornel Drăgușin	1962	1963		3	1	1	1	33.33	
(Iraq) Adil Basher	June 1963	November 1964		6	4	2	0	66.67	1964 Arab Nations Cup - Champions
(Iraq) Shawqi Aboud	July 1965	September 1965		3	0	2	1	0.00	
(Iraq) Adil Basher	March 1966	April 1966		6	5	1	0	83.33	1966 Arab Nations Cup - Champions
(Iraq) Jalil Shihab	March 1967	March 1967		2	1	1	0	50.00	
(Socialist Federal Republic of Yugoslavia) Ljubomir Kokeza	March 1969	March 1969		2	0	0	2	0.00	
(Soviet Union) Yuri Illichev	November 1969	July 1971		4	1	1	2	25.00	
(Iraq) Adil Basher	September 1971	January 1972		12	9	2	1	75.00	
(Iraq) Abdelilah Hassan	May 1972	May 1972		3	0	2	1	0.00	
(Hungary) Teleki Gyula	February 1973	March 1973		6	3	2	1	50.00	
(Iraq) Thamir Muhsin	August 1973	August 1973		4	0	3	1	0.00	
(Iraq) Wathiq Naji	February 1974	June 1974		3	0	2	1	0.00	
(Iraq) Thamir Muhsin	August 1974	September 1974		6	3	2	1	50.00	
(Iraq) Wathiq Naji	January 1975	January 1975		2	1	1	0	50.00	
(Scotland) Danny McLennan	April 1975	April 1976		18	11	5	2	61.11	
(Socialist Federal Republic of Yugoslavia) Lenko Grčić "Kaka"	June 1976	January 1977		6	1	2	3	16.67	1976 AFC Asian Cup - Fourth place
(Iraq) Jamal Salih	July 1977	July 1977		7	3	3	1	42.86	
(Socialist Federal Republic of Yugoslavia) Lenko Grčić "Kaka"	August 1977	July 1978		15	8	4	3	53.33	
(Iraq) Ammo Baba	December 1978	February 1980		16	12	2	2	75.00	5th Arabian Gulf Cup - Champions
(Iraq) Wathiq Naji	February 1980	March 1980		2	1	1	0	50.00	
(Iraq) Anwar Jassam	June 1980	July 1980		1	0	0	1	0.00	
(Socialist Federal Republic of Yugoslavia) Vojo Gardašević	February 1981	March 1981		6	4	1	1	66.67	
(Iraq) Douglas Aziz	March 1981	March 1981		1	1	0	0	100.00	
(Iraq) Ammo Baba	August 1981	August 1984		23	14	5	4	60.87	1982 Asian Games - Champions; 7th Arabian Gulf Cup - Champions
(Iraq) Akram Salman	October 1984	June 1985		4	3	0	1	75.00	
(Iraq) Anwar Jassam	July 1985	August 1985		4	3	1	0	75.00	1985 Arab Nations Cup - Champions; 1985 Pan Arab Games - Champions
(Iraq) Wathiq Naji	September 1985	September 1985		2	1	0	1	50.00	
(Brazil) Jorge Vieira	October 1985	November 1985		2	1	1	0	50.00	1986 FIFA World Cup - Qualification
(Brazil) Edu	February 1986	March 1986		1	0	1	0	0.00	
(Brazil) Zé Mário	March 1986	April 1986		6	1	3	2	16.67	
(Brazil) Evaristo de Macedo	May 1986	June 1986		3	0	0	3	0.00	1986 FIFA World Cup - Group stage
(Iraq) Akram Salman	July 1986	October 1986		5	3	1	1	60.00	
(Iraq) Ammo Baba	February 1987	June 1988		7	4	2	1	57.14	9th Arabian Gulf Cup - Champions
(Iraq) Jamal Salih	July 1988	July 1988		2	0	2	0	0.00	
(Iraq) Ammo Baba	July 1988	January 1989		6	2	3	1	33.33	1988 Arab Nations Cup - Champions
(Iraq) Jamal Salih	January 1989	October 1989		3	2	1	0	66.67	
(Iraq) Anwar Jassam	October 1989	March 1990		10	4	5	1	40.00	
(Iraq) Adnan Dirjal	August 1992	October 1993		11	6	3	2	54.55	
(Iraq) Ammo Baba	October 1993	October 1993		4	1	3	0	25.00	
(Iraq) Anwar Jassam	March 1995	July 1995		3	2	1	0	66.67	
(Iraq) Ammo Baba	August 1996	August 1996		2	2	0	0	100.00	
(Iraq) Yahya Alwan	November 1996	June 1997		11	7	1	3	63.64	
(Iraq) Ayoub Odisho	June 1997	June 1997		2	1	0	1	50.00	
(Iraq) Ammo Baba	August 1997	August 1997		1	1	0	0	100.00	
(Iraq) Akram Salman	November 1998	November 1998		2	2	0	0	100.00	
(Iraq) Najih Humoud	June 1999	November 1999		13	8	3	2	61.54	
(Iraq) Adnan Hamad	January 2000	September 2000		7	3	1	3	42.86	
(Serbia and Montenegro) Milan Živadinović	October 2000	October 2000		4	1	1	2	25.00	
(Iraq) Adnan Hamad	January 2001	September 2001		13	5	3	5	38.46	
(Croatia) Rudolf Belin	September 2001	January 2002		6	1	2	3	16.67	
(Iraq) Adnan Hamad	January 2002	September 2002		8	8	0	0	100.00	2002 WAFF Championship - Champions
(Germany) Bernd Stange	October 2002	April 2004		17	6	6	5	35.29	
(Iraq) Adnan Hamad	April 2004	January 2005		18	7	2	9	38.89	
(Iraq) Akram Salman	12 January 2005	22 May 2007	2 years, 130 days	27	12	7	8	44.44	2005 West Asian Games - Champions
(Brazil) Jorvan Vieira	25 May 2007	29 July 2007	65 days	14	5	6	3	35.71	2007 AFC Asian Cup - Champions
(Norway) Egil Olsen	17 September 2007	26 February 2008	162 days	6	2	3	1	33.33	
(Iraq) Adnan Hamad	27 February 2008	25 June 2008	119 days	8	2	1	5	25.00	
(Brazil) Jorvan Vieira	2 September 2008	6 February 2009	157 days	4	0	2	2	0.00	
(Iraq) Radhi Shenaishil	22 February 2009	21 May 2009	88 days	2	0	1	1	0.00	
(Serbia) Bora Milutinović	23 April 2009	20 June 2009	58 days	4	0	3	1	0.00	2009 FIFA Confederations Cup - Group stage
(Iraq) Nadhim Shaker	10 July 2009	18 November 2009	131 days	4	4	0	0	100.00	
(Germany) Wolfgang Sidka	8 August 2010	8 August 2011	1 year, 0 days	27	13	6	8	48.15	
(Brazil) Zico	28 August 2011	28 November 2012	1 year, 92 days	22	10	6	6	45.45	
(Iraq) Hakeem Shaker	3 December 2012	6 February 2013	65 days	12	7	2	3	58.33	
(Serbia) Vladimir Petrović	21 February 2013	10 September 2013	201 days	7	1	0	6	14.29	
(Iraq) Hakeem Shaker	10 September 2013	29 November 2014	1 year, 80 days	15	5	4	6	33.33	
(Iraq) Radhi Shenaishil	13 December 2014	21 February 2015	70 days	10	2	3	5	20.00	2015 AFC Asian Cup - Fourth place
(Iraq) Akram Salman	25 February 2015	17 June 2015	112 days	3	2	0	1	66.67	
(Iraq) Yahya Alwan	3 August 2015	24 March 2016	234 days	8	3	3	2	37.50	
(Iraq) Abdul-Ghani Shahad	24 March 2016	29 March 2016	5 days	1	1	0	0	100.00	
(Iraq) Radhi Shenaishil	20 April 2016	10 April 2017	355 days	11	2	3	6	18.18	
(Iraq) Basim Qasim	22 May 2017	5 August 2018	1 year, 75 days	17	8	8	1	47.06	
(Slovenia) Srečko Katanec	4 September 2018	30 June 2021	2 years, 299 days	38	20	13	5	52.63	
(Netherlands) Dick Advocaat	31 July 2021	23 November 2021	115 days	6	0	4	2	0.00	
(Montenegro) Željko Petrović	23 November 2021	2 February 2022	71 days	6	1	4	1	16.67	
(Iraq) Abdul-Ghani Shahad	3 March 2022	29 March 2022	26 days	3	2	1	0	66.67	
(Iraq) Radhi Shenaishil	7 August 2022	12 November 2022	50 days	4	1	2	1	25.00	
(Spain) Jesús Casas	12 November 2022	15 April 2025	2 years, 161 days	34	18	8	8	52.94	25th Arabian Gulf Cup - Champions
(Australia) Graham Arnold	10 May 2025	present	1 year, 191 days	24	10	6	8	41.67	2026 FIFA World Cup - Qualification
