= List of Al-Zawraa SC managers =

Al-Zawraa Sports Club (Arabic: نادي الزوراء الرياضي) is an Iraqi sports club based in Utayfia, Karkh District (near Tigris River), Baghdad. Their football team compete in the Iraqi Premier League, the top-flight of Iraqi football. The team has had 63 coaches.

As of 11 August 2025

Managers
Name	From	To	Duration	P	W	D	L	Win %	Major tournaments and regional achievements
(Iraq) Abdul-Wahab Khalaf	1969	1973							
(Iraq) Dawood Salman Al-Azzawi	1973	1974							
(Iraq) Rashid Radhi	1974	1975							
(Iraq) Saadi Salih	1975	1977							Iraqi Premier League: 1975–76, 1976–77 Winners; Iraq FA Cup: 1975–76 Winners
(Iraq) Anwar Jassam	1977	1984							Iraqi Premier League: 1978–79 Winners; Iraq FA Cup: 1978–79, 1980–81, 1981–82 Winners
(Iraq) Rashid Radhi	1984	1985							
(Iraq) Wathiq Naji	1985	1986							
(Iraq) Falah Hassan	1986	1991							Iraqi Premier League: 1990–91 Winners; Iraq FA Cup: 1988–89, 1989–90, 1990–91 Winners
(Iraq) Ali Kadhim	1991	1991							
(Iraq) Ammo Baba	1991	1992							
(Iraq) Nawar Hussein	1992	1992							
(Iraq) Anwar Jassam	1992	1993							Iraq FA Cup: 1992–93 Winners
(Iraq) Abdul-Amir Naji	1993	1993							
(Iraq) Ammo Baba	1993	1994							Iraqi Premier League: 1993–94 Winners; Iraq FA Cup: 1993–94 Winners
(Iraq) Kadhim Khalaf	1994	1995							
(Iraq) Kadhim Al-Rubaie	1994	1995							
(Iraq) Amer Jameel	1995	1995							
(Iraq) Hadi Mutanash	1995	1995							Iraqi Premier League: 1994–95 Winners; Iraq FA Cup: 1994–95 Winners
(Iraq) Adnan Hamad	1995	1996							Iraqi Premier League: 1995–96 Winners; Iraq FA Cup: 1995–96 Winners
(Iraq) Hadi Mutanash	1996	1997							
(Iraq) Ammo Baba	1997	1997							
(Iraq) Anwar Jassam	1997	1998							Iraq FA Cup: 1997–98 Winners
(Iraq) Adnan Hamad	1998	1998							
(Iraq) Amer Jameel	1998	1999							Iraqi Premier League: 1998–99 Winners; Iraq FA Cup: 1998–99 Winners
(Iraq) Adnan Hamad	1999	2001							Iraqi Premier League: 1999–00 Winners; Iraq FA Cup: 1999–00 Winners
(Iraq) Ibrahim Ali	2001	2001							
(Iraq) Sabah Abdul-Jalil	2001	2001							Iraqi Premier League: 2000–01 Winners
(Iraq) Rasheed Radhi	2001	2001							
(Iraq) Adnan Hamad	2001	2002							
(Iraq) Kadhim Khalaf	2001	2002							
(Iraq) Saad Abdul-Hameed	2001	2002							
(Iraq) Akram Salman	2002	2002							
(Iraq) Ahmed Radhi	2002	2003							
(Iraq) Salam Hashim	2003	2004							
(Iraq) Adnan Hamad	2004	2004							
(Iraq) Hadi Mutanash	2004	2004							
(Iraq) Basim Qasim	21 October 2004	17 May 2005	208 days	26	17	6	3	65.38	
(Iraq) Mohammed Hussein Nasrallah	2005	2005							
(Iraq) Salih Radhi	2005	2007							Iraqi Premier League: 2005–06 Winners
(Iraq) Karim Saddam	2007	2007							
(Iraq) Radhi Shenaishil	13 August 2007	1 September 2008	1 year, 19 days	30	15	8	7	50.00	
(Iraq) Kadhim Khalaf	2008	2008							
(Iraq) Yahya Alwan	8 December 2008	2009	115 days	19	8	6	5	42.11	
(Iraq) Hazem Jassam	2009	2010							
(Iraq) Essam Hamad	29 March 2010	27 August 2010	151 days	27	17	4	6	62.96	
(Iraq) Mohammed Jassim Mehdi (caretaker)	31 August 2010	3 September 2010	3 days	2	2	0	0	100.00	
(Iraq) Radhi Shenaishil	8 September 2010	16 August 2011	342 days	27	19	6	2	70.37	Iraqi Premier League: 2010–11 Winners
(Iraq) Karim Saddam	29 October 2011	29 November 2011	31 days	5	1	1	3	20.00	
(Iraq) Yahya Alwan	2 December 2011	26 March 2012	115 days	13	6	4	3	46.15	
(Iraq) Radhi Shenaishil	26 March 2012	28 June 2014	2 years, 94 days	84	38	25	21	45.24	
(Iraq) Jamal Ali	4 July 2014	6 October 2014	94 days	2	1	0	1	50.00	
(Iraq) Emad Mohammed	6 October 2014	30 June 2015	267 days	22	9	5	8	40.91	
(Iraq) Basim Qasim	21 July 2015	9 June 2016	324 days	31	20	9	2	64.52	Iraqi Premier League: 2015–16 Winners
(Iraq) Thair Ahmed	14 June 2016	1 November 2016	150 days	6	2	2	2	33.33	
(Iraq) Essam Hamad	3 November 2016	22 August 2017	292 days	44	27	12	5	61.36	Iraq FA Cup: 2016–17 Winners
(Iraq) Ayoub Odisho	23 August 2017	22 February 2019	1 year, 183 days	73	46	23	4	63.01	Iraqi Premier League: 2017–18 Winners
(Iraq) Bassim Luaibi (caretaker)	22 February 2019	26 February 2019	4 days	1	0	0	1	0.00	
(Iraq) Hakim Shaker	26 February 2019	19 September 2019	205 days	36	14	12	10	38.89	Iraq FA Cup: 2018–19 Winners
(Iraq) Basim Qasim	20 September 2019	30 December 2020	1 year, 101 days	47	23	17	7	48.94	
(Iraq) Haidar Abdul-Amir (caretaker)	30 December 2020	3 January 2021	4 days	1	1	0	0	100.00	
(Iraq) Radhi Shenaishil	3 January 2021	4 August 2021	213 days	43	24	14	5	55.81	
(Iraq) Essam Hamad	20 August 2021	22 December 2021	124 days	16	12	2	2	75.00	
(Iraq) Haidar Abdul-Amir (caretaker)	22 December 2021	31 January 2022	40 days	5	1	3	1	20.00	
(Iraq) Ayoub Odisho	31 January 2022	11 May 2023	1 year, 100 days	51	20	23	8	39.22	
(Iraq) Haidar Abdul-Amir (caretaker)	11 May 2023	25 July 2023	75 days	10	4	3	3	40.00	
(Egypt) Hossam El Badry	31 July 2023	2 April 2024	246 days	27	10	13	4	37.04	
(Iraq) Essam Hamad	2 April 2024	26 February 2025	331 days	41	26	9	6	63.41	
(Iraq) Haidar Obeid	26 February 2025	2 July 2025	125 days	17	12	1	4	70.59	
(Iraq) Abdul-Ghani Shahad	22 July 2025	6 October 2025	76 days	5	1	2	2	20.00	
(Egypt) Emad El Nahhas	10 October 2025	present	81 days	0	0	0	0	—	
