= Herdi =

Herdi (Arabic: هيردي) is a Kurdish male given name. Notable people with the name include:

- Herdi Noor Al-Deen (born 1992), Kurdish football player
- Herdi Prenga (born 1994), Albanian-Croatian football player
- Herdi Siamand (born 1983), Iraqi football player
