= Arjan Mostafa =

Swedish-born Iraqi footballer

Personal information
- Date of birth: 5 May 1994 (age 32)
- Place of birth: Borås, Sweden
- Height: 1.79 m (5 ft 10 in)
- Position: Forward

Youth career
- –2002: SK Winno
- 2003–2014: IF Elfsborg

Senior career*
Years	Team	Apps	(Gls)
2015	IF Elfsborg	0	(0)
2016	Zakho FC	5	(0)

International career
2013	Sweden U19	2	(1)
2015	Iraq	1	(0)
- * Club domestic league appearances and goals

Arjan Mostafa (Arabic: ارجان مصطفى; born 5 May 1994) is an Iraqi former professional footballer who played as a forward for Swedish club IF Elfsborg and Iraqi Premier League club Zakho FC. He has Swedish and Iraqi passports. He made his international debut for Iraq in a 31 March 2015 friendly against DR Congo.

== See also ==
- List of Iraq international footballers
