= Jesús Casas =

Spanish football manager (born 1973)

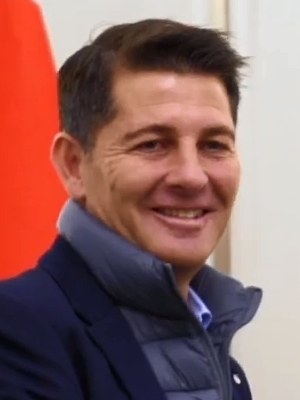
- Casas in 2024

Personal information
- Full name: Jesús Casas García
- Date of birth: 23 October 1973 (age 53)
- Place of birth: Madrid, Spain

Youth career
- GE CASA
- 1985–1992: Cádiz

Senior career*
Years	Team	Apps	(Gls)
1992–1993	Balón de Cádiz		
1993–1995	Cádiz B		
1994–1995	→ Sanluqueño (loan)		
1995–1996	Jerez Industrial		
1996–1998	Chiclana		
1998–2001	Puerto Real		
2001–2002	Jerez Industrial		
2002–2003	Puerto Real		

Managerial career
- 2003–2004: Cádiz (youth)
- 2004–2005: Cádiz B (assistant)
- 2005–2007: Balón de Cádiz (youth)
- 2007–2008: Balón de Cádiz
- 2008–2009: Cádiz B
- 2009–2010: Rota
- 2010–2011: Deportes Romero
- 2012–2013: Conil
- 2013–2014: Balón de Cádiz (youth)
- 2018: Watford (assistant)
- 2018–2022: Spain (assistant)
- 2022–2025: Iraq
- 2026: Lion City Sailors
Medal record
Men's football
Representing Iraq (as manager)
Arabian Gulf Cup
Winner	2023 Iraq
- * Club domestic league appearances and goals

Jesús Casas García (born 23 October 1973) is a Spanish football manager. He is recently the manager of Singapore Premier League club, Lion City Sailors.

== Managerial career ==
=== Early career ===
Casas began his coaching career at age 29 with the youth sides of Cádiz CF. He later worked as match analyst for SD Eibar and FC Barcelona B, before becoming a scout and match analyst at FC Barcelona. He then returned to Cádiz, to become a director of their youth department.

On 21 January 2018, Casas became an assistant manager to Javi Gracia at Premier League club Watford but then left the club on 9 July 2018 to became an assistant manager to Luis Enrique and Robert Moreno with the Spain national team, a position he held until February 2022.

=== Iraq ===
On 5 November 2022, the IFA confirmed that Casas would take charge of Iraq national team for four years on an annual payment of $1m split into monthly wages. Radhi Shenaishil was supposed to lead the national team for the Mexico and Ecuador friendly games in Spain, while Casas would take charge of the games against Costa Rica and Venezuela in Iraq, with his first game coming on 17 November 2022. The following matches were cancelled, as for Costa Rica match due to passport stamp issues at the border, while the match against Venezuela was called off for an unknown reason.

Casas began with the national team officially on 30 December 2022 in a friendly against Kuwait as a preparatory match for the 25th Arabian Gulf Cup in Basra, which they eventually won after a 3–2 victory over Oman in the final, to be their first title in the competition since 1988.

On 19 January 2024, in the 2023 AFC Asian Cup held in Qatar, Iraq beat Japan 2–1 in what was Japan's first group stage loss in the tournament since 1988, and also broke Japan’s streak of 10 wins in a row. The win also ensured that Iraq would top their group, which last happened in the 2007 edition of the competition. In the Round of 16 knockout stage, Iraq lost 2–3 to Jordan, as Aymen Hussein was sent-off during the match for excessive celebration. At the press conference, several Iraqi journalists began to point and yell at Casas. The situation necessitated the intervention of security who escorted the journalists out. The Asian Football Confederation (AFC) later decided to ban those journalists for covering any future AFC tournaments. The Iraq Football Association showed their full support for Casas following the ordeal. On 1 February 2024, Casas met with the Iraqi Prime Minister Mohammed Shia' Al Sudani and the President of the Iraqi Football Association Adnan Dirjal where the incident was discussed, with Casas receiving further backing as Al Sudani promised the journalists involved would be investigated.

On 27 March 2025, following Iraq's 2–1 loss to Palestine in the 2026 AFC World Cup qualifiers, IFA held an urgent meeting that resulted in a unanimous decision to sack Casas and his staff. Casas' contract was terminated on 15 April 2025.

=== Lion City Sailors ===
Casas who was on the verge of signing a deal with Honduras national team collapsed after the Honduras team director failed to reach an agreement due to a differing visions on the composition of his coaching staff. This saw Casas sign a two and a half year contract with Singapore Premier League club Lion City Sailors until the end of the 2027–28 season on 23 February 2026. Casas led Lion City Sailors FC to win the 2025-26 Singapore Premier League shortly after taking charge of the club.

On 1 September 2026, just days ahead of Lion City Sailors FC's 2026-27 Playback Community Shield meeting with Tampines Rovers FC, Lion City Sailors FC sacked Casas.

== Managerial statistics ==
As of 1 September 2026

Managerial record by team and tenure
Team	Nat.	From	To	Record								Ref.
Team	Nat.	From	To	G	W	D	L	GF	GA	GD	Win %	Ref.
Iraq	(Iraq)	5 November 2022	15 April 2025	34	18	8	8	56	34	+22	52.94	
Lion City Sailors	(Singapore)	23 February 2026	1 September 2026	11	6	3	2	14	3	+11	54.55	
Career Total				45	24	11	10	70	37	+33	53.33	

== Honours ==
=== Manager ===
Iraq

- Arabian Gulf Cup: 2023

Lion City Sailors

- Singapore Premier League: 2025–26
