= Herdi Noor Al-Deen =

Iraqi footballer

Herdi Noor Al-Din
Personal information
- Full name: Herdi Noor Al-Din Mohammed
- Date of birth: January 24, 1992 (age 34)
- Place of birth: Kirkuk, Iraq
- Height: 1.64 m (5 ft 5 in)
- Position: Midfielder

Team information
- Current team: Kirkuk FC

Senior career*
Years	Team	Apps	(Gls)
2007–2008	Kirkuk FC		
2008–2009	Arbil FC		
2009–2010	Zakho FC		
2010	Al-Zawraa		
Jan2011	Peshmerga FC		
2011–2012	Zakho FC		
2012	Kirkuk FC		

International career^{‡}
2009–	Iraq	2	(0)
- * Club domestic league appearances and goals ‡ National team caps and goals as of March 28, 2009

Herdi Noor Al-Din (Arabic: هيردي نور الدين; born January 24, 1992, in Kirkuk, Iraq) is an Iraqi football player of Kurdish ethnicity, who currently plays for Kirkuk FC in Iraq. He was called to the Iraq Youth team by Kadhim Al-Rubaiawy but later was Released by Hakim Shakir.

== Info ==
The Kirkuk-born midfielder was a revelation for his hometown club before a tug of war between Pires and Arbil late last year saw him move to the Iraqi league champions Arbil FC, despite having signed a deal to play for Pires FC. He was called for the national team under Radhi Shenaishil to play a friendly match against Saudi Arabia. A prospect for the future.

2010-2011 The midfielder has stated he plans on attending a high school in Minnesota to play soccer and learn English, Al-Din is said to be part of an exchange program post-Sadaam era with the United States aimed at educating kids about diversity and understanding. 2 other players are to join him, but have not been formally announced.
