= Jorge Vieira (Brazilian footballer) =

Brazilian football manager (1934–2012)

Personal information
- Full name: Jorge Silva Vieira
- Date of birth: 18 July 1934
- Place of birth: Rio de Janeiro, Brazil
- Date of death: 24 July 2012 (aged 78)
- Place of death: Rio de Janeiro, Brazil

Senior career*
Years	Team	Apps	(Gls)
1950–1956	Madureira		

Managerial career
- 1960–1961: America
- 1962–1963: Vasco da Gama
- 1965–1967: Belenenses
- 1968: Galícia
- 1968–1969: Vitória de Guimarães
- 1970: Sport
- 1970–1971: Vitória de Guimarães
- 1971: Bahia
- 1972: Vitória
- 1974: América Mineiro
- 1977: Botafogo-SP
- 1977–1978: Palmeiras
- 1978: Atlético Mineiro
- 1979: Corinthians
- 1979: Botafogo
- 1982: Portuguesa
- 1983–1984: Corinthians
- 1985–1986: Iraq
- 1987–1990: Club América
- 1990–1992: Puebla FC
- 1993–1994: El Salvador
- 1996: Fluminense
- 1998: Araçatuba
- 1999: Toros Neza
- * Club domestic league appearances and goals

Jorge Silva Vieira, usually known as Jorge Vieira (18 July 1934 – 24 July 2012), was a Brazilian football player and head coach.

== Career ==
Jorge Vieira was born in Rio de Janeiro. He won the Campeonato Carioca as America's manager, when he was 26 years old. America's line-up was Amaro, Antoninho, Nilo, Jorge, Calazans, Djalma Dias, Quarentinha, Ari, Pompéia, Ivan and Wilson Santos.

Jorge Vieira managed Belenenses, of Portugal, in 1965-66 (26 matches) and in 1966-67 (one match). In 1977, he managed Botafogo-SP, winning that year's Campeonato Paulista first stage, named Taça Cidade de São Paulo. Botafogo-SP's line-up was: Aguillera, Wilson Campos, Nei, Manoel and Mineiro; Mário, Lorico and Sócrates; Zé Mário, Arlindo and João Carlos Motoca.

Vieira managed Palmeiras in 1977 and in 1978, and in 1979, as Corinthians's manager, he, with the help of the midfielder Sócrates, who was a former Botafogo-SP player, won the Campeonato Paulista. Jorge Vieira managed Corinthians again when the club won the Campeonato Paulista 1983, replacing Mário Travaglini, who was hired by Corinthians rival São Paulo. Its rival was defeated in the competition's final. Corinthians' line-up was: Leão; Alfinete, Juninho, Mauro and Wladimir; Paulinho, Biro-Biro, Sócrates and Zenon; Casagrande and Eduardo Amorim.

He then managed several Mexican clubs, and the Iraq and El Salvador national teams. He won two league titles with Mexican side Club América.

== Honors ==
Vieira won the Campeonato Carioca as América's manager in 1960, and won the Campeonato Paulista twice managing Corinthians in 1979 and in 1983.
