= Abdul-Ghani Shahad =

Iraqi footballer and coach

Personal information
- Full name: Abdul-Ghani Shahad
- Date of birth: 7 March 1968 (age 58)
- Place of birth: Najaf, Iraq
- Position: Defender

Team information
- Current team: Duhok SC (Manager)

Senior career*
Years	Team	Apps	(Gls)
1987–1999	Al-Najaf		

Managerial career
- 1999: Al-Najaf
- 2003–2008: Al-Najaf
- 2005–2006: Iraq U20 (assistant)
- 2008–2009: Al-Talaba
- 2009–2010: Karbala
- 2010–2013: Al-Najaf
- 2013–2015: Naft Al-Wasat
- 2015–2016: Iraq U23
- 2016: Iraq (interim)
- 2016–2017: Naft Al-Wasat
- 2017–2020: Iraq U23
- 2020: Al-Shorta
- 2021–2022: Naft Al-Wasat
- 2022: Iraq
- 2022–2023: Naft Al-Wasat
- 2023-2025: Al-Najaf FC
- 2025: Zakho SC
- 2025: Al-Zawraa
- 2025-2026: Duhok SC
Medal record
Men's football
Representing Iraq (as manager)
AFC U-23 Championship
Bronze medal – third place	2016
- * Club domestic league appearances and goals

Abdul-Ghani Shahad (Arabic: عَبْد الْغَنِيّ شَهْد; born 7 March 1968) is an Iraqi professional football coach and former player who is former manager of Al-Zawraa in the Iraqi Premier League. Abdul-Ghani started his playing career at Al-Najaf FC and remained a one-club man throughout his career. Upon his retirement in 1999, he went into coaching and managed his hometown club Al-Najaf for 7 years, achieving a second-place finish. He moved around and managed a number of Iraqi sides, before winning his first Iraqi Premier League title with Naft Al-Wasat. Abdul-Ghani went on to be appointed as manager of the Iraqi U23 national team, where he guided the team towards Olympic qualification and a third-place finish in the AFC U-22 Championship.

== Playing career ==
Abdul-Ghani started his career as a 19 year old with Al Najaf, and he remained loyal to his boyhood club for 12 years until his retirement in 1999. His first season in 1986/87 was in the second division, and were promoted to the second division one year later. From 1987 onwards, Al Najaf slowly established itself as an important team in the Iraqi league, moving gradually from mid table towards title-contention. Abdul-Ghani was a fixture of the team from '87 onwards alongside Ali Hashim, Hassan Jawad, Mohammed Abdul-Hussein, Haidar Najim, with the team managed by legendary Najih Humoud. The team peaked in the late '90s finishing 3rd in the 94–95 season, and second in the 95–96 season. Abdul-Ghani was an unused substitute as Al Najaf won its first ever silverware, the 7th Umm al-Ma'arik Championship. Towards 1999 Abdul-Ghani has become a bench player who saw very little playtime, so he retired and became the interim manager for 15 matches. Abdul-Ghani Shahad never represented Iraq at any level.

== Managerial career ==
=== Al Najaf ===
Abdul Ghani Shahad become the interim manager of Al Najaf in 1999, where he managed the team for 15 games, winning 7 games. Despite his impressive record, Abdul-Ghani was relegated to assistant manager, due to his inexperience.

Abdul Ghani Shahad's first full season in charge of Al Najaf was the 2002-03 season, which was cancelled after 29 rounds due to the American Invasion of Iraq with Al-Najaf being in second place before the outbreak of the war. During the season Al Najaf only lost 3 matches and were serious title contenders.

The following season was abandoned midway through because of the security situation in the country.

The 2004/05 season was the first full season which was completed since the start of the Iraq War, Abdul-Ghani Shahad led Al Najaf to be second on the Euphrates Group, with only one loss. In the Elite stage, Al Najaf finished second in their group, behind Al-Zawraa, and failed to qualify to the championship playoffs.

The 2005/06 season was the standout season for Abdul Ghani Shahad and Al Najaf. Abdul Ghani Shahad led the team to a second-place finish in the Central Group A, which meant the qualified to the Elite stage for the second season running. In the Elite stage, Al Najaf managed to finish first in their group and qualifying to the championship playoff, they beat Erbil in the semifinal 5–2 on aggregate. The final against Al-Zawraa was played in Sulaymaniyah on June 24, 2006, the match went to penalties scoreless. Uday Omran and Chasib Sultan missed their penalties as Al-Najaf lost, 4–3, on penalties. Despite the loss, it was still Al Najaf's joint-best league position. Finishing second also meant that Al Najaf qualified to the AFC Champions League for the first time ever.

The following season, Al Najaf finished 3rd in their group and were eliminated from the AFC Champions League. Meanwhile, in the league, Al Najaf once again reached the playoff contention, however they lost to Erbil SC in the semi-final, while they beat Al-Talaba SC in the third place playoff, and qualified to the Arab Champions League.

In the 2007/08 season, Al Najaf once again made the playoffs but failed to reach the semi-final. They were also eliminated from the Arab Champions League in the second round.

Following the end of the season, Abdul-Ghani got an offer from giants Al-Talaba SC which he took.

=== Al Talaba ===
Under Abdul Ghani, Al Talaba failed to qualify to the playoffs in the 2008/09 season after finishing 3rd in group B, 3 points behind second place Al Amana. The performance was deemed unsatisfactory and he was subsequently relieved of his duties as manager of Al Talaba.

=== Karbala ===
Following his sacking, Abdul Ghani signed for Karbala on the 15th of June 2009. He led the time to finish 4th in group B, an impressive jump from 11th position in the season prior. Karbala were eliminated in the Elite stage after finishing third behind Duhok SC and Al Quwa Al Jawiya. Following his impressive stint with Karbala, Abdul Ghani returned to Al Najaf.

=== Return to Al Najaf ===
Following the 2009/10 season, Abdul-Ghani returned once again to his boyhood club Al Najaf. His first season ended on a disappointing note after Al Najaf finished in 6th place and were 18 points behind playoff contention. Despite the undesirable results, Al Najaf decided to keep faith with their man, the following season saw the league return to a Round-robin tournament. The league ended with Al Najaf finishing in 9th place. The 12/13 season also finished with Al Najaf in 9th place. Following that season, Abdul-Ghani moved to a new team founded in Al-Najaf playing in the second division named Naft Al-Wasat.

=== Naft Al Wasat ===
Abdul-Ghani Shahad took a gamble and signed for second division side Naft Al Wasat in August 2013. He took them on a historic campaign, finishing first in all three stages undefeated. A total of twenty-five games without a loss meant that the team would be promoted to the Iraqi Premier League.

The following season Abdul Ghani Shahad led the team to its first ever season in the top flight. They achieved an amazing feat by qualifying to the Elite stage. They went on to qualify to the final to face Al Quwa Al Jawiya They game was played in Al-Shaab Stadium in front of a sold-out crowd and the game went to penalties, where Naft Al Wasat ended up winning the match due to the heroics of Noor Sabri saving 3 penalties.

=== Iraq U23 ===
In 2015, Shahad was appointed as the manager of the Iraqi U23 team, replacing Yahya Alwan. His first tournament in charge was the 2016 AFC U-23 Championship, in which Iraq finished third, after defeating Qatar in extra time. The bronze medal meant that Iraq also qualified to the 2016 Summer Olympics.

In the Olympic games, Shahad was applauded by fans and pundits for his defensive formations that led to a 0–0 draw with heavyweights Brazil. However, Iraq failed to qualify from the group after finishing in 3rd place with 3 points from 3 games.

Under his management, Iraq qualified to the 2018 AFC U-23 Championship by winning all three games in their qualification group. They were knocked out of the quarterfinals of the competition, following a defeat in penalty kicks against Vietnam.

=== Iraq National Team ===
Following the 2–2 draw vs Thailand, Yahya Alwan resigned as manager of the national side, Abdul-Ghani was brought on as an interim coach. He only managed one game, which he won against Vietnam.

=== Return to Naft Al Wasat ===
In July 2016, Naft Al Wasat reached an agreement with Abdul-Ghani to manage both the club and the U23 side simultaneously. However he left before the end of the season due to his obligations to the Iraqi U23 side.

=== Al Shorta ===
On 18 February 2020, Shahad signed with Al-Shorta to lead them in the restarted 2019–20 league season. The competition was cut short due to the COVID-19 pandemic, however, Al Shorta still had to complete their 2020 AFC Champions League campaign. The team came close to advancing to the round of 16 but were eliminated on goal difference. Abdul Ghani resigned following a goalless draw against Zakho in the third matchweek of the 2020–21 season, for what he described as "personal reasons".

=== Al Mina'a ===
In January 2021, Al Najaf announced that they have re-signed Abdul Ghani Shahad, bringing him back to his boyhood club However the deal collapsed due to the club's financial hardship. Al Mina'a hired Abdul-Ghani Shadhad after the club had fallen to 19th in the standings. However the deal also collapse due to interest from another one of his former clubs Naft Al Wasat and his desire to stay in Najaf

== Statistics ==
=== Managerial ===
As of 29 June 2022

Team	Nat	From	To	Record				
Team	Nat	From	To	G	W	D	L	Win %
Al-Najaf	(Iraq)	1999	1999	15	7	5	3	46.67
Al-Najaf	(Iraq)	August 2002	July 2008	122	74	27	21	60.66
Al-Talaba	(Iraq)	August 2008	May 2009	20	13	4	3	65.00
Karbala	(Iraq)	June 2009	March 2010	12	6	4	2	50.00
Najaf	(Iraq)	8 April 2010	22 February 2013	128	48	40	40	37.50
Naft Al-Wasat	(Iraq)	August 2013	4 August 2015	50	31	13	6	62.00
Iraq (Caretaker)	(Iraq)	25 March 2016	29 March 2016	1	1	0	0	100.00
Naft Al-Wasat	(Iraq)	1 July 2016	14 March 2017	24	14	8	2	58.33
Iraq U23	(Iraq)	10 August 2015	18 February 2020	44	24	14	6	54.55
Al-Shorta	(Iraq)	18 February 2020	6 November 2020	15	7	7	1	46.67
Naft Al-Wasat	(Iraq)	23 January 2021	10 February 2022	49	20	20	9	40.82
Iraq	(Iraq)	10 February 2022	29 March 2022	3	2	1	0	66.67
Naft Al-Wasat	(Iraq)	29 March 2022	""Present""	13	5	5	3	38.46
Total				377	185	118	74	49.07

== Honours ==
=== As Player ===
- Baghdad Championship
  - Winner 1997–98 with Al-Najaf
- Iraqi Premier League:
  - Runner up 1995/96 with Al-Najaf

=== As Manager ===
- Iraqi Premier League:
  - Winner 2014/15 with Naft Al-Wasat
  - Runner up 2005/06 with Al-Najaf
  - Third place 2006/07 with Al-Najaf
- Cup of Love:
  - Winner 2003 with Al-Najaf

Iraq U-23

- AFC U-23 Championship: Third place 2016

Iraq U-23

- 2020 AFC U-23 Championship qualification : Qualified for the 2020 AFC U-23 Championship
