= Mohammed Qabel =

Iraqi footballer

Personal information
- Full name: Mohammed Qabel Mahdi
- Date of birth: January 9, 1988 (age 38)
- Place of birth: Iraq
- Position: Defender

Team information
- Current team: Karbalaa FC

Senior career*
Years	Team	Apps	(Gls)
2006–2012	Karbalaa FC		
2012–2015	Amanat Baghdad		
2015	Al-Najaf FC		
2016–2017	Al-Quwa Al-Jawiya		
2017–	Karbalaa FC		

International career^{‡}
2008	Iraq U-21	1	(0)
2009–	Iraq	3	(0)
- * Club domestic league appearances and goals as of N/A ‡ National team caps and goals as of 25 September 2010

Mohammed Qabel Mahdi (Arabic: محمد قابل) (born 9 January 1988 in Iraq) is an Iraqi football defender. He currently plays for the Karbalaa FC football club in Iraq.
