= Vojo Gardašević =

Montenegrin football manager and player (born 1940)

Personal information
- Date of birth: 10 October 1940 (age 86)
- Place of birth: Podgorica, Kingdom of Yugoslavia
- Position: Defender

Youth career
- Budućnost Titograd

Senior career*
Years	Team	Apps	(Gls)
1957–1966	Budućnost Titograd		
1966–1968	Sutjeska Nikšić		
1968–1969	Zwolsche Boys	32	(2)
1969–1971	PEC	60	(7)

Managerial career
- 1980-1981: Zeta
- 1981: Al-Tayaran
- 1981: Iraq
- 1996: Kenya
- 1996: Gor Mahia
- 1997–2001: Seychelles
- 2002: Eritrea
- 2002–2005: La Passe
- 2006–2010: Anse Réunion
- * Club domestic league appearances and goals

Vojo Gardašević (born 10 October 1940) is a Montenegrin former football player and coach.

== Playing career ==
A defender, Gardašević played most of his career with Budućnost Titograd (1957–1966), including four seasons in the Yugoslav First League and five seasons in the Yugoslav Second League. He also helped the club reach the Yugoslav Cup final in 1965.

After spending two seasons with rivals Sutjeska Nikšić, Gardašević moved abroad to the Netherlands in 1968 and played regularly for Tweede Divisie clubs Zwolsche Boys and PEC until 1971.

== Managerial career ==
During his managerial career, Gardašević worked in numerous countries, mostly in the Middle East and East Africa. He was also manager of several national teams, including Iraq, Kenya, Seychelles, and Eritrea. Between 2006 and 2010, Gardašević lastly served as manager of Seychelloise club Anse Réunion.

== Honours ==
=== Manager ===
Anse Réunion

- Seychelles Premier League: 2006
