= Željko Petrović =

Montenegrin association football player

- Petrović managing RKC Waalwijk in 2008

Personal information
- Date of birth: 13 November 1965 (age 61)
- Place of birth: Nikšić, SFR Yugoslavia
- Height: 1.75 m (5 ft 9 in)
- Position: Right-back

Team information
- Current team: (manager)

Senior career*
Years	Team	Apps	(Gls)
1986–1990	Budućnost	76	(7)
1990–1991	Dinamo Zagreb	32	(2)
1991–1992	Sevilla	11	(1)
1992–1994	Den Bosch	40	(7)
1994–1996	RKC	60	(13)
1996–1997	PSV	35	(6)
1997–2000	Urawa Red Diamonds	62	(3)
2000–2004	RKC	97	(5)
Total		413	(44)

International career
1990–1998	FR Yugoslavia (Note: Including 2 caps for SFR Yugoslavia.)	18	(0)

Managerial career
- 2004–2005: Feyenoord (assistant)
- 2006: Boavista
- 2007–2008: RKC
- 2008–2009: Hamburger SV (assistant)
- 2010: West Ham United (assistant)
- 2011: Urawa Red Diamonds
- 2012–2013: Anzhi Makhachkala (assistant)
- 2013–2014: Al-Shaab
- 2014: Serbia (assistant)
- 2015: Sunderland (assistant)
- 2016–2017: ADO Den Haag
- 2018–2019: Utrecht (assistant)
- 2019: Botev Plovdiv
- 2019: Badak Lampung
- 2020: Inter Zaprešić
- 2020–2021: Feyenoord (assistant)
- 2021: Willem II
- 2021–2022: Iraq
- 2024: Zrinjski Mostar
- 2024–2025: Qadsia
- 2025–2026: Al Dhafra
- * Club domestic league appearances and goals

Željko Petrović (Serbian Cyrillic: Жељко Петровић; born 13 November 1965) is a Montenegrin professional football manager and former player. As a player, he represented the FR Yugoslavia national team at the 1998 FIFA World Cup.

== Club career ==
=== Budućnost ===
Petrović made his professional debut with Budućnost in 1986 under manager Milan Živadinović. In Petrović's second and third season at Budućnost under manager Stanko Poklepović, the team included the likes of Dejan Savićević, Branko Brnović, Anto Drobnjak, Predrag Mijatović and Niša Saveljić. During Petrović's time at Budućnost, the team finished in seventh place in the 1986–87 season, in ninth place in the 1987–88 season, fourteenth in the 1988–89 season, and tenth in the 1989–90 season.

=== Dinamo Zagreb ===
Petrović moved to Dinamo Zagreb in 1990, where he played as a right-back. In June 1991, Dinamo changed their name to HAŠK Građanski. In HAŠK Građanski's short 1991–92 UEFA Cup campaign, Petrović scored all three of HAŠK Građanski's goals over two legs played against Trabzonspor. He scored two penalties in the first leg played on 17 September 1991, which HAŠK lost 3–2 to Trabzonspor. He scored another goal in the second leg played on 2 October 1991, which HAŠK tied 1–1. In spite of Petrović's goalscoring form, HAŠK were eliminated from the UEFA Cup losing to Trabzonspor on aggregate.

=== Sevilla ===
Petrović joined Sevilla in November 1991, with his transfer from HAŠK Građanski costing the Spanish team 500,000 DM. HAŠK Građanski had agreed on Petrović's transfer as part of a package with Davor Šuker, who joined Sevilla simultaneously. At the time, La Liga teams could field only up to four foreigners on the pitch, and Sevilla already had two foreign starters in Iván Zamorano and Pablo Bengoechea. With the addition of Šuker, Petrović was meant to be Sevilla's fourth foreign starter, although he initially enjoyed little playing time. Gradually, manager Víctor Espárrago began bringing him off the bench, and in a breakthrough performance, Petrović made an assist in Sevilla's 1–0 win against Real Murcia in the 1992 Copa del Rey Round of 16. On 22 March 1992, Petrović scored his only goal in a league match with Real Burgos, with Sevilla winning 3–2. However, after the departure of Espárrago, a markedly dry spell followed, especially when Sevilla signed Diego Maradona in the summer of 1992. Therefore, he was quick to sign for Dutch club Den Bosch that summer.

=== Den Bosch and Waalwijk ===
Petrović joined Den Bosch in 1992 while his father was living in nearby Heusden as a guest worker. This circumstance seemed to be a deciding factor in his move to Den Bosch, as it was widely regarded that he could have easily played for a more competitive team. Den Bosch director Chris van der Laar commented that Petrović was "too good for Den Bosch". In spite of Petrović's good reception, Den Bosch struggled in the 1992–93 season and ended up relegated back to the second tier at the end of the season. After a 5–0 loss against Feyenoord in May 1993, Den Bosch manager Hans van der Pluijm noted that "[Petrović] is playing three classes better than the rest of the team." He was eager to join RKC Waalwijk in 1994. It was at this club which he excelled as an attacking right-back, and he scored 13 goals in total of 2 seasons before joining Dutch giants PSV Eindhoven in 1996.

=== PSV ===
Petrović joined PSV Eindhoven in the summer of 1996. He was a regular starter during the 1996–97 season, when PSV won the Eredivisie that season under manager Dick Advocaat. In his second season at the club, however, he proved a difficult player to manage and he was also involved in a spat with team captain Arthur Numan. Towards the end of Petrović's time at PSV, Advocaat was critical of his smoking habits. In the fall of 1997, Petrović accepted a lucrative offer from the Urawa Red Diamonds, which estranged him from the rest of the club. He insisted that he did not wish to leave PSV, but that the offer could not be ignored since ten of his relatives were living off of his money in Yugoslavia. Petrović played a total of 35 games for PSV. He played his last game for PSV on 5 November 1997, in a Champions League match against Newcastle United at St James' Park.

=== Urawa Red Diamonds ===
In 1997, he moved to Japan to play for Urawa Red Diamonds before returning to RKC Waalwijk in 2000 where he finished his playing career.

== International career ==
Petrović made his debut for the national team of Yugoslavia on 12 September 1990 in a match against Northern Ireland. Yugoslavia was subsequently banned from the Euro 1992, the 1994 FIFA World Cup, and the Euro 1996 due to FIFA suspending Yugoslavia following the international sanctions against Yugoslavia. Petrović would play for Yugoslavia again five years after his debut, for the qualification to the 1998 FIFA World Cup.

=== Death threat ===
Petrović was a regular of the Yugoslavia national team throughout the 1998 FIFA World Cup qualification. On 28 October 1997, the night before the first leg of the qualifying play-off against Hungary, Petrović received a death threat by an anonymous phone caller. The caller gave Petrović twelve hours to leave Yugoslavia before being killed. In the time preceding the death threat, Petrović had been subject to a whispering campaign that suggested he once played for the Croatia national team during the breakup of Yugoslavia, before Croatia became an official FIFA member. Petrović strongly denied this, and teammate Savo Milošević accused some journalists of jeopardizing Petrović's life by spreading fake news about him. Petrović went on to play for Yugoslavia at the 1998 FIFA World Cup.

After the rumors were spread, Petrović took several opportunities to explain how the media identified him. When a Dutch journalist asked Petrović about his nationality considering the breakup of Yugoslavia, Petrović insisted on his identity as a Yugoslav. He explained himself with the following:

"I'm not going to change...I'm Montenegrin, as you are Brabantian and he is Frisian. But here [in the Netherlands] are all Dutch people. That's not what we are after, after the war [in Yugoslavia]. But if you're Yugoslav, you're Yugoslav."

== Managerial career ==
On 21 August 2006, Petrović was appointed as the new manager of Portuguese team Boavista. In his first match as manager, Boavista won 3–0 against Benfica. However, he resigned in October 2006 after only a month and a half in charge. The following 2007–08 season, Petrovic led RKC Waalwijk to a second place finish in the Dutch second division, but ultimately failed to gain promotion to the Eredivisie. In the 2008–09 season, he was Martin Jol's assistant at Hamburger SV.

On 28 July 2010, West Ham United confirmed Petrović as the assistant manager to manager Avram Grant. On 23 November 2010, West Ham parted company with Petrović after less than four months. Upon his departure he made controversial comments about the Premier League questioning its quality. In February 2010, Petrovic was named as assistant to manager Guus Hiddink at Anzhi Makhachkala.

On 17 March 2015, Petrović was named the assistant to manager Dick Advocaat at Sunderland, but was sacked on 4 October later that year. He became an assistant to manager Advocaat once more when he joined him at Utrecht in 2018.

=== Botev Plovdiv ===
In the beginning of June 2019, Botev Plovdiv introduced Petrović as the new manager of the club. Following his recommendations, the club signed Marko Pervan, Philippe van Arnhem and Rodney Klooster. After a long run of poor results, on 16 October, Petrović was sacked. Shortly after that, van Arnhem and Klooster were also released. In 12 games under his guidance, Botev Plovdiv won only twice, achieved three draws and lost seven matches, last four of which in a row. The next Botev Plovdiv manager achieved seven wins in a row with the same squad, raising questions as to the competency of Petrović.

=== Inter Zaprešić ===
In the beginning of January 2020, Inter Zaprešić introduced Petrović as their new manager. On 10 April 2020, following the COVID-19 pandemic, Petrović terminated the contract with the club.

He was appointed as assistant to Advocaat again at Feyenoord in summer 2020.

=== Iraq ===
After the resignation of Dick Advocaat in November 2021 as manager of the Iraq national team, Petrović took over on a caretaker basis. He would coach Iraq at the 2021 FIFA Arab Cup and the final round of the World Cup. In the last seconds of his first match as head coach against Oman, which ended in a 1–1 draw, Petrović entered the field to designate who would kick the penalty. He was sacked on 2 February 2022.

=== Zrinjski Mostar ===
On 5 January 2024, Petrović was appointed manager of Bosnian Premier League club Zrinjski Mostar. He was victorious in his first match in charge as Zrinjski beat Slavija Sarajevo in the Bosnian Cup second round on 10 February 2024. The team drew 0–0 away against Željezničar in his first league match as manager on 17 February. In his first ever Mostar derby, Petrović's side defeated rivals Velež on 13 April 2024. On 23 May 2024, Petrović won his first major trophy as a manager after Zrinjski beat Borac Banja Luka 2–0 on aggregate in the Bosnian Cup final.

On 20 June 2024, it was announced by Zrinjski that Petrović had left the club by mutual consent.

== Career statistics ==
=== Club ===
Appearances and goals by club, season and competition
Club	Season	League			National Cup		League Cup		Continental		Total	
Club	Season	Division	Apps	Goals	Apps	Goals	Apps	Goals	Apps	Goals	Apps	Goals
Budućnost Titograd	1986–87	Yugoslav First League	17	0					—		17	0
Budućnost Titograd	1987–88	Yugoslav First League	18	3					—		18	3
Budućnost Titograd	1988–89	Yugoslav First League	21	3					—		21	3
Budućnost Titograd	1989–90	Yugoslav First League	20	1					—		20	1
Budućnost Titograd	Total		76	7					—		76	7
Dinamo Zagreb	1990–91	Yugoslav First League	32	2							32	2
Sevilla	1991–92	La Liga	11	1	4	0					15	1
Den Bosch	1992–93	Eredivisie	13	1							13	1
Den Bosch	1993–94	Eerste Divisie	27	6							27	6
Den Bosch	Total		40	7							40	7
RKC Waalwijk	1994–95	Eredivisie	30	4							30	4
RKC Waalwijk	1995–96	Eredivisie	30	9							30	9
RKC Waalwijk	Total		60	13							60	13
PSV	1996–97	Eredivisie	25	5							25	5
PSV	1997–98	Eredivisie	10	1							10	1
PSV	Total		35	6							35	6
Urawa Red Diamonds	1997	J1 League	0	0	2	1	0	0	—		2	1
Urawa Red Diamonds	1998	J1 League	27	2	3	0	0	0	—		30	2
Urawa Red Diamonds	1999	J1 League	19	1	0	0	4	0	—		23	1
Urawa Red Diamonds	2000	J2 League	16	0	0	0	0	0	—		16	0
Urawa Red Diamonds	Total		62	3	5	1	4	0	—		71	4
RKC Waalwijk	2000–01	Eredivisie	21	2							21	2
RKC Waalwijk	2001–02	Eredivisie	23	0							23	0
RKC Waalwijk	2002–03	Eredivisie	22	1							22	1
RKC Waalwijk	2003–04	Eredivisie	31	2							31	2
RKC Waalwijk	Total		97	5							97	5
Career total			413	44	9	1	4	0	0	0	426	45

=== International ===
Appearances and goals by national team and year
National team	Year	Apps	Goals
SFR Yugoslavia	1990	1	0
SFR Yugoslavia	1991	1	0
SFR Yugoslavia	1992	0	0
FR Yugoslavia	1993	0	0
FR Yugoslavia	1994	0	0
FR Yugoslavia	1995	0	0
FR Yugoslavia	1996	0	0
FR Yugoslavia	1997	8	0
FR Yugoslavia	1998	8	0
Total		18	0

=== Managerial ===
As of match played 21 November 2025

Team	From	To	Record				
Team	From	To	G	W	D	L	Win %
Boavista	28 August 2006	22 October 2006	6	2	1	3	33.33
RKC	1 July 2007	30 June 2008	42	24	13	5	57.14
Urawa Red Diamonds	1 February 2011	20 October 2011	36	13	11	12	36.11
Al-Shaab	23 December 2013	12 May 2014	17	2	3	12	11.76
ADO Den Haag	1 July 2016	7 February 2017	24	7	2	15	29.17
Botev Plovdiv	1 July 2019	10 October 2019	13	3	3	7	23.08
Inter Zaprešić	4 January 2020	10 April 2020	7	1	1	5	14.29
Willem II	29 January 2021	30 June 2021	14	6	3	5	42.86
Iraq	24 November 2021	2 February 2022	6	1	3	2	16.67
Zrinjski Mostar	5 January 2024	20 June 2024	22	18	3	1	81.82
Al Dhafra	1 July 2025	present	11	4	0	7	36.36
Total			198	81	43	74	40.91

== Honours ==
=== Player ===
PSV

- Eredivisie: 1996–97
- Johan Cruyff Shield: 1996, 1997

=== Manager ===
Zrinjski Mostar

- Bosnian Cup: 2023–24
