= Adnan Hamad =

Iraqi football manager and former player (born 1961)

Personal information
- Full name: Adnan Hamad Majid Al-Abbassi
- Date of birth: 1 February 1961 (age 65)
- Place of birth: Samarra, Iraq
- Position: Striker

Team information
- Current team: Al-Karma (manager)

Senior career*
Years	Team	Apps	(Gls)
1978–1982	Samaraa		
1982–1983	Salahaddin		
1983–1988	Al-Zawraa		
1988–1989	Al-Talaba		
1989–1990	Al-Quwa Al-Jawiya		
1990–1992	Al-Zawraa		
1992–1994	Samaraa		

International career
1982–1986	Iraq	17	(6)

Managerial career
- 1994–1996: Al-Zawraa (youth)
- 1996–1998: Al-Zawraa
- 1997–1998: Iraq U20
- 1998–1999: Dubai
- 1999–2001: Al-Zawraa
- 2000: Iraq
- 2000–2001: Iraq U20
- 2001: Iraq
- 2001–2002: Al-Zawraa
- 2002: Iraq
- 2003–2004: Iraq U23
- 2003–2004: Al-Zawraa
- 2004: Lebanon
- 2004: Iraq
- 2005–2006: Al-Ansar
- 2006–2008: Al-Faisaly
- 2008: Iraq
- 2009–2013: Jordan
- 2014: Bani Yas
- 2014: Bahrain
- 2016–2017: Al-Wehdat
- 2021–2023: Jordan
- 2025: Al-Orobah
- 2025–2026: Etihad (sports consultant)
- 2026–: Al-Karma
- * Club domestic league appearances and goals

Adnan Hamad Majid Al-Abbassi (Arabic: عَدْنَان حَمَد مَاجِد الْعَبَّاسِيّ; born 1 February 1961) is an Iraqi football manager and former player, who currently coaches Al-Karma.

== Career ==
=== Playing career ===
Adnan was born in Samarra, Iraq, the son of a wealthy land-owning family. He started his career with Samarra juniors in 1975 at the age of 14. In 1982, Adnan was called up by the famous Iraq national coach Wathiq Naji to join Salahaddin Football Club, where he spending only one season. There, he won the Iraq Super League cup during 1982–83 season.
Yugoslav coach Miodrag Stankovic. Stankovic later called a young Adnan into the Iraq Under-19 team. Later, Adnan moved to Baghdad and signed for Al-Zawraa. In 1984, he was called up by Ammo Baba to the Iraq national football team for the 1984 Gulf Cup. He later went on to make over 20 appearances for the national team winning the 1985 Pan-Arab Games & and 1985 Arab Cup. He also played for Al-Talaba and Al-Tayaran club teams in Iraq.

=== Managerial career ===
After being plagued by injuries during the latter parts of his career, he went into coaching and managed his home club Samarra in a player-coach role in the 1992–93 season. During this time he also managed to score 33 goals for the club. He later became the coach of Al-Zawraa and was assistant coach of the Iraq national football team to Yahya Alwan during the 1996 AFC Asian Cup in the United Arab Emirates.

Hamad spent time in Europe studying coaching techniques before coaching abroad in the UAE with Dubai SC. He first coached the Iraq national team in February 2000 and led the team to third place at the 2000 West Asian Football Federation Championship in Amman. He was then replaced by Milan Zivadinovic only two months before the 2000 AFC Asian Cup in Lebanon.

Adnan was back as the national coach of Iraq for the second time a year later after Milan Zivadinovic was sacked. Hamad led Iraq to the second round of the 2002 FIFA World Cup qualifiers before he was replaced by Croatian Rudolf Belin after two consecutive defeats to Bahrain and Saudi Arabia in the opening three matches of the tournament.

His third period as coach of Iraq came in 2002 when he helped Iraq to the WAFF Championship win in Damascus with a dramatic 3–2 win over Jordan in extra-time before being replaced with the German Bernd Stange. Hamad had a short stint as manager of the Lebanon national team between 22 January 2004 and 8 February 2004. He regained his position as coach of Iraq when Bernd Stange left in 2004 a year after the 2003 invasion of Iraq by the United States. Hamad managed to lead Iraq Olympic football team to a fourth place finish at the 2004 Summer Olympics.

He was national coach of Jordan between 2009 and 2013. He led them to the quarter-finals of the 2011 Asian Cup and the play-off round of the 2014 FIFA World Cup qualification. On 7 February 2014, Hamad was appointed to coach Baniyas in the UAE Arabian Gulf League. On 6 August 2014, Hamad was appointed to coach Bahrain on a two-year contract. He later coached Al-Wehdat in 2016–2017.

On 16 June 2021, he was reappointed as the head coach of Jordan, a position he held until the end of his contract in June 2023. On 10 January 2025, he became the manager of Saudi club Al-Orobah. In late April of that year, he was dismissed while the club was fighting to avoid relegation.

== Managerial statistics ==
As of 19 June 2023

Team	From	To	Record				
Team	From	To	G	W	D	L	Win %
Iraq	January 2000	September 2000	7	3	1	3	42.86
Iraq U20	November 2000	June 2001	9	4	3	2	44.44
Iraq	January 2001	September 2001	13	5	3	5	38.46
Iraq	January 2002	September 2002	8	8	0	0	100.00
(Iraq) Al-Zawraa	October 2002	March 2003	29	18	9	2	62.07
Iraq U23	September 2003	April 2004	16	8	1	7	50.00
Iraq	April 2004	January 2005	18	7	2	9	38.89
Lebanon	January 2004	February 2004	0	0	0	0	—
(Saudi Arabia) Al-Ansar	2005	2006	23	1	6	16	4.35
(Jordan) Al-Faisaly	2006	2008	100	53	30	17	53.00
Iraq	March 2008	June 2008	8	2	1	5	25.00
Jordan	February 2009	June 2013	68	28	19	21	41.18
(United Arab Emirates) Bani Yas	February 2014	May 2014	10	2	1	7	20.00
Bahrain	August 2014	November 2014	6	2	3	1	33.33
(Jordan) Al-Wehdat	June 2016	May 2017	39	18	15	6	46.15
Jordan	June 2021	June 2023	23	16	0	7	69.57
Total			377	175	94	108	46.42

== Honors ==
=== As manager ===
==== Club ====
Al-Zawraa

- Iraqi Premier League: 1996, 2000
- Iraq FA Cup: 1996, 2000
- Baghdad Championship: 1999, 2003
- Iraqi Super Cup: 1999, 2000

Al-Faisaly

- AFC Cup: 2006
- Jordan FA Shield: 2008
- Jordan Super Cup: 2006

==== International ====
Iraq U23

   Football at the 2004 Summer Olympics – Men's tournament: 2004 (Fourth Place)

Iraq U20

   AFC U-19 Championship: 2000

Iraq

   WAFF: 2002

==== Individual ====
- AFC Coach of the Year: 2004
- Lebanese Premier League Best Coach: 2005–06
