= Lenko Grčić =

Croatian footballer and coach

Personal information
- Date of birth: 26 March 1925
- Place of birth: Split, Kingdom of Serbs, Croats and Slovenes
- Date of death: 10 August 1999 (aged 74)
- Place of death: Split, Croatia

Youth career
- 1940–1946: RNK Split

Senior career*
Years	Team	Apps	(Gls)
1946–1950	Naša Krila		
1950–1956	Hajduk Split		

Managerial career
- 1963: Hajduk Split
- 1963–1967: Stade Soussien
- 1967–1971: ES Métlaoui
- 1972–1973: RNK Split
- 1976–1978: Iraq
- * Club domestic league appearances and goals

Lenko Grčić (26 March 1925 – 10 August 1999) was a Croatian footballer and coach.

== Playing career ==
Born in Split, Grčić began his football career in 1940 with the juniors of RNK Split, where he continued to play until 1946. In 1946 he joined the Army and for three years was a regular for JRV Naša Krila based in Zemun, playing over 300 games for the club. In June 1950 after the 1949–1950 season, the club was dissolved and Grčić joined Hajduk Split and played for the club until 1956.

== Managerial career ==
Grčić coached Croatian side Hajduk Split in 1963 and the Iraqi national side between 1976 and 1978.
