= Jorvan Vieira =

Brazilian-Portuguese football coach and former player

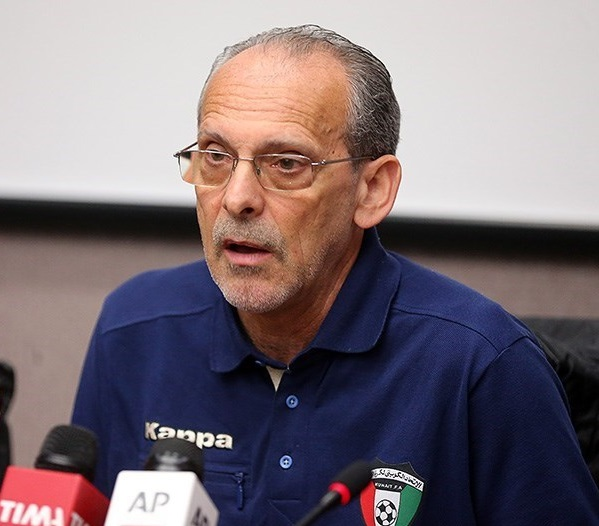
- Vieira as Kuwait manager in 2014

Personal information
- Date of birth: 29 September 1953 (age 73)
- Place of birth: Duque de Caxias, Rio de Janeiro, Brazil
- Position: Defender

Team information
- Current team: Newroz (manager)

Senior career*
Years	Team	Apps	(Gls)
1970–1972	Vasco da Gama		
1972–1978	Botafogo		
1978–1980	Portuguesa		

Managerial career
- 1980: Qatar SC
- 1982–1983: Oman U-20
- 1984–1990: FAR Rabat (assistant)
- 1984–1990: Morocco (assistant)
- 1991–1992: Wydad Casablanca
- 1992–1993: IR Tanger
- 1993: CA Macedo de Cavaleiros
- 1993: Tihad Sportif Casablanca
- 1993–1994: IR Tanger
- 1994–1995: SC Farense
- 1996–1997: União Sport Clube Paredes
- 1998–1999: Al Qadisiya
- 1999: Ismaily
- 1999–2000: Oman U-20
- 2000–2004: Malaysia U-20
- 2004: US Touarga
- 2005–2006: Al Nasr
- 2006–2007: Al-Ta'ee
- 2007: Iraq
- 2007–2008: Sepahan
- 2008–2009: Iraq
- 2010–2011: Ittihad Kalba
- 2011: Bani Yas
- 2011: Sharjah
- 2012–2013: Zamalek
- 2013–2015: Kuwait
- 2016: Smouha
- 2017–2018: Ittihad Kalba
- 2018: Ismaily
- 2020: Étoile Sahel
- 2021: Al-Wehdat
- 2021–2022: ENPPI
- 2023–2024: Al-Seeb
- 2024: Newroz
Medal record
Men's football
Representing Iraq (as manager)
AFC Asian Cup
Winner	2007
- * Club domestic league appearances and goals

Jorvan Vieira (born 29 September 1953) is a Brazilian–Portuguese football coach and former player who played for Botafogo, Vasco da Gama and Portuguesa in the Brazil Serie A, and current manager.

== Career ==
=== Playing career ===
Vieira was born in Duque de Caxias, Rio de Janeiro state, Brazil. He began his professional football career after studying Sports Medicine for four years, playing for top Brazilian clubs Vasco da Gama, Botafogo and Portuguesa in the 1970s.

=== Coaching career ===
Vieira was appointed assistant manager to the Moroccan national side for the 1986 FIFA World Cup in Mexico. Alongside compatriot José Faria he led Morocco into the second round of the tournament as group winners ahead of England, Portugal and Poland,

He then managed the Kuwait under-20 side before having an impressive spell and leading Al Qadisiya to the Kuwaiti league title, which was followed by further success when he was in charge of Egyptian club Al-Ismaili in 2001. Vieira was re-appointed as the coach of the Oman Under-20 side in the same year. After spending a year in the job, Vieira went on to coach the Malaysia Under-20 side before returning to Oman, where he led Al-Nasr Salalah to the Sultan Qaboos Cup, and was manager of Al-Ta'ee in Saudi Arabia.

On 26 December 2007 it was officially announced that Vieira signed a one-year contract with Mes Kerman F.C. in the Iran Pro League for an approximate fee of $640,000. Yet a few days later on 29 December the deal fell through due to financial reasons.

On 2 February 2008 Vieira signed an 18-month contract with AFC Champions League 2007 finalists Sepahan F.C. Vieira was sacked by Sepahan F.C. on 9 June 2008, 12 months before his contract would expire.

Vieira signed a one-year contract with Iraq on 2 September 2008 to manage them for the second time, when he led them in the Gulf Cup.

On 10 August 2013 Jorvan Vieira was named coach of Kuwait's national side. The Brazilian led Iraq's national side to success in the 2007 Asian Cup.

In October 2018 Jorvan Viera was named coach of Ismaily from Egypt. After a string of poor results sitting in the bottom of the league and getting knocked out of the 2018-19 Arab Club Champions Cup at the expense of Raja Casablanca on penalty's 4-2 he resigned on 13 December 2018, after only 2 months at the club.

== Asian Cup success ==
Less than two months ahead of the 2007 AFC Asian Cup finals Vieira was named coach of Iraq, a country under conflict. He led them all the way to the final of the 2007 WAFF Championship but finished as runners-up after losing 1–2 in the final against Iran. After this tournament, Iraq played in the Asian Cup. Incredibly, he led Iraq to the 2007 Asian Cup title after stunning the pre-tournament favourites Australia in a 3–1 victory, edging South Korea on penalties and finally upsetting regional heavyweights Saudi Arabia 1–0 in the final.

== Personal life ==
Jorvan Vieira is a Muslim. He converted to Islam while coaching Morocco, he says about this: "Reports have suggested that I converted to Islam but 'converted' is not the right term – I wasn't religious before. Nor is it true that I only became a Muslim because of my Arab wife, as has also been claimed". He can speak 7 languages, including Arabic. He holds a doctorate in sports sciences from France. He is the son of a Portuguese father, a Brazilian mother and is married to Khadija Fahim, a Moroccan woman. As the result of this he holds Brazilian and Portuguese nationalities. Jorvan thinks of himself mainly as being Portuguese, confesses that he always carries with him his Portuguese passport, and that his identification cards at football matches identify him as being Portuguese. In an interview to the Portuguese newspaper Diário de Notícias, he even states that in the future, he wants to live the rest of his life in Portugal, and that he plans to coach a Portuguese football club.

== Managerial statistics ==
As of match played 9 January 2021

Managerial record by team and tenure
Team	From	To	Record					Ref.
Team	From	To	P	W	D	L	Win %	Ref.
(Kuwait) Qadsia SC	5 January 1999	22 June 1999	33	19	7	7	57.6	
(Egypt) Ismaily	5 January 2001	30 June 2001	12	5	4	3	41.7	
(Saudi Arabia) Al-Tai	1 August 2006	30 December 2006	13	3	4	6	23.1	
Iraq	20 May 2007	15 August 2007	14	5	6	3	35.7	
(Iran) Sepahan	26 December 2007	20 May 2008	26	12	8	6	46.2	
Iraq	2 September 2008	6 February 2009	5	0	3	2	0.0	
(United Arab Emirates) Ittihad Kalba	27 October 2010	5 June 2011	20	7	8	5	35.0	
(United Arab Emirates) Baniyas	1 July 2011	30 November 2011	14	5	3	6	35.7	
(United Arab Emirates) Sharjah	16 December 2011	2 February 2012	9	2	3	4	22.2	
(Egypt) Zamalek	10 August 2012	5 July 2013	30	19	7	4	63.3	
Kuwait	23 August 2013	7 December 2014	26	9	9	8	34.6	
(Egypt) Smouha	11 July 2016	1 November 2016	8	5	1	2	62.5	
(United Arab Emirates) Ittihad Kalba	10 January 2018	2 September 2018	15	9	3	3	60.0	
(Egypt) Ismaily	4 October 2018	12 December 2018	11	5	3	3	45.5	
(Tunisia) Étoile Sahel	29 November 2020	11 January 2021	8	4	2	2	50.0	
(Egypt) ENPPI	5 June 2022	30 August 2022	13	3	4	6	23.1	
(Oman) Seeb	3 July 2023	25 May 2024	36	27	6	3	75.0	
(Iraq) Newroz	1 August 2024	11 December 2024	9	2	2	5	22.2	
Total			302	141	83	78	46.7	—

== Honours ==
=== Manager ===
Al-Qadsia

- Kuwait Premier League: 1998–99
- Kuwait Crown Prince Cup: 1998–99

Al-Nasr

- Sultan Qaboos Cup: 2005–06

Iraq

- AFC Asian Cup: 2007

Al-Seeb

- Oman Professional League: 2023–24
- Oman Professional League Cup: 2023–24
- Oman Super Cup: 2023
