= Anwar Jassam =

Iraqi football coach (1947–2024)

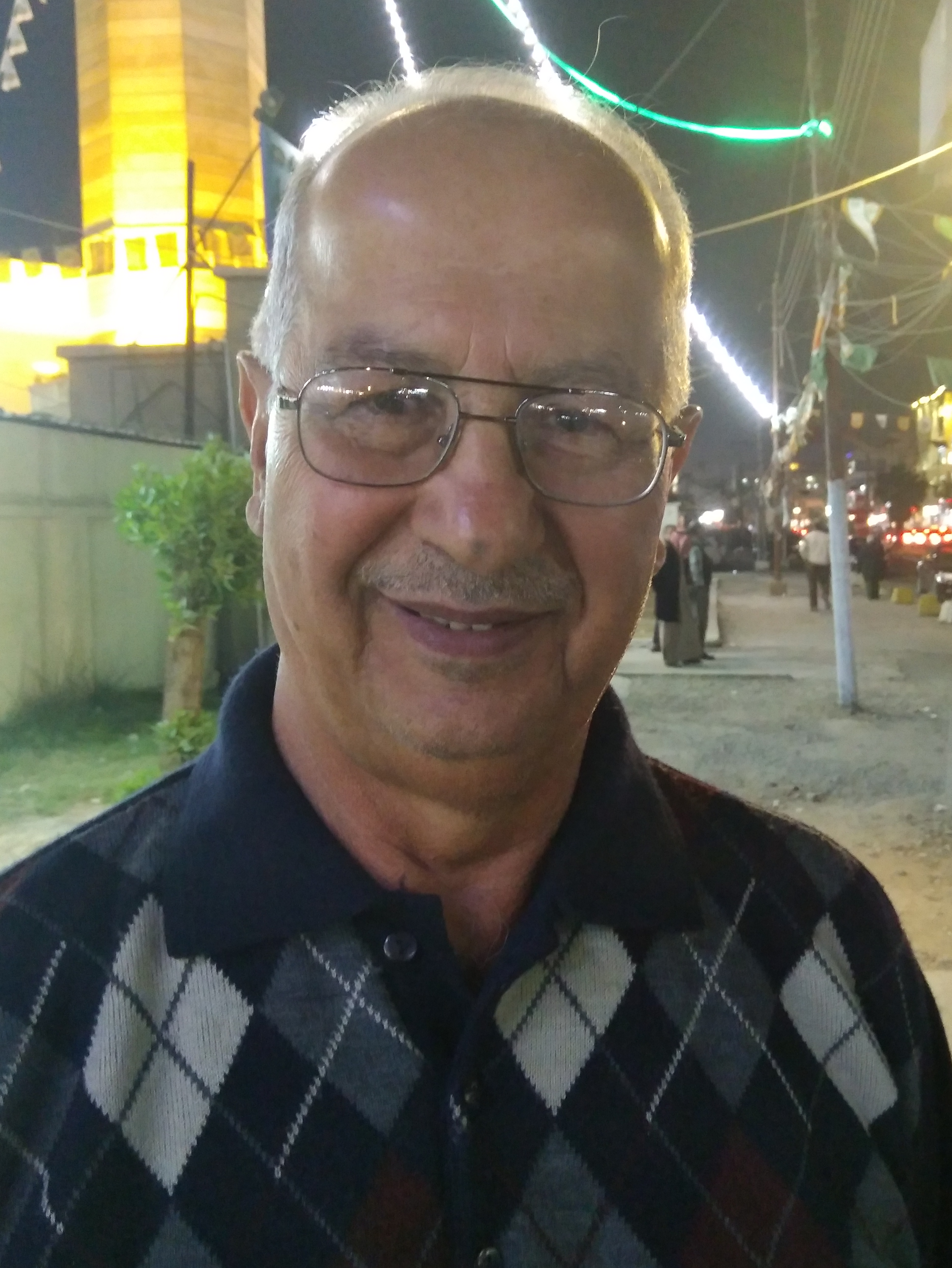
- Jassam in 2017

Personal information
- Full name: Anwar Jassam Houbi
- Date of birth: 1947
- Place of birth: Baghdad, Iraq
- Date of death: 16 September 2024 (aged 77)
- Position: Defender

Senior career*
Years	Team	Apps	(Gls)
1965–1971	Sikak Al-Hadeed		

Managerial career
- 1971–1975: Sikak Al-Hadeed
- 1978–1985: Al-Zawraa
- 1980: Iraq
- 1985: Iraq
- 1988–1989: Al-Naft
- 1989: Iraq U20
- 1989–1990: Iraq
- 1991–1992: Al-Naft
- 1992–1993: Al-Zawraa
- 1995–1996: Iraq
- 1997: Al-Wehdat
- 2000–2001: Al-Talaba
- * Club domestic league appearances and goals

Anwar Jassam Houbi (Arabic: أَنْوَر جَسَام هُوبِيّ; 1947 – 16 September 2024) was an Iraqi football coach.

Jassam won the 1978–79 Iraqi League with Al-Zawraa and also won five Iraq FA Cup titles with them, more than any other manager in the history of the Iraq FA Cup.

Jassam died on 16 September 2024, at the age of 77.
