= Akram Salman =

Iraqi footballer & manager (born 1945)

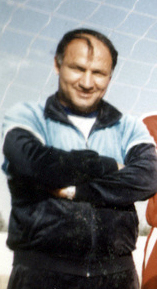

Personal information
- Full name: Akram Ahmed Salman
- Date of birth: 15 July 1945 (age 81)
- Place of birth: Baghdad, Iraq

Senior career*
Years	Team	Apps	(Gls)
1963–1970	Isalat Al-Mai	?	(?)

Managerial career
- 1970–1974: Isalat Al-Mai
- 1974–1978: Al-Amana
- 1978–1979: Karbalaa
- 1979–1981: Al Jabalain
- 1982–1984: Al Talaba
- 1985–1988: Al Rasheed
- 1989–1992: Al-Arabi
- 1993–1994: Al-Shoalah
- 1995–1996: Al-Arabi
- 1996–1997: Emirates Club
- 1996–1997: Dibba Al-Hisn
- 1998–1999: Al Talaba
- 1999–2001: Tadamon Sour
- 2002: Al-Zawraa
- 2005–2007: Iraq
- 2007–2008: Erbil
- 2008–2009: Al-Wehdat
- 2009–2010: Al-Telal
- 2010–2011: Al-Faisaly
- 2011: Duhok
- 2011–2013: Safa
- 2013: Erbil
- 2014: Al-Nasr
- 2014-2015: Baqa'a
- 2015: Iraq
- 2015: Al-Wehdat
- 2016: Al-Ramtha
- 2019–2019: Erbil
- * Club domestic league appearances and goals

Akram Ahmed Salman (Arabic: أًكْرَم أَحْمَد سَلْمَان; born 15 July 1945) is an Iraqi football manager and former head coach of Al-Wehdat.

== Playing career ==
Akram Ahmed Salman began his career in 1963 as a player for Esalet Al-Mae, and went on to coach the team in 1970, as one of the youngest coaches in Iraq.

== Coaching career ==
Akram Ahmed Salman coached the Iraq national team in 2015. He resigned from the position in June 2015.

Salman is now leading Erbil in the 2018-2019 season. He took charge of the team on 28 April 2019, after Nadhum Shaker left. Salman is coaching the Iraqi north team now.

=== Managerial statistics ===
As of 5 October 2019

Team	Nat	From	To	Record				
Team	Nat	From	To	G	W	D	L	Win %
Iraq	(Iraq)	September 1986	October 1986	5	3	1	1	60.00
Iraq	(Iraq)	November 1998	November 1998	2	2	0	0	100.00
Iraq	(Iraq)	12 January 2005	22 May 2007	30	12	10	8	40.00
Erbil	(Iraq)	26 ِApril 2007	23 April 2008	26	16	6	4	61.54
Al-Wehdat	(Jordan)	31 August 2008	14 August 2009	52	32	11	9	61.54
Al-Tilal	(Yemen)	19 August 2009	31 July 2010	37	23	5	9	62.16
Al-Faisaly	(Jordan)	31 August 2010	25 October 2010	4	3	1	0	75.00
Duhok	(Iraq)	11 February 2011	8 October 2011	26	13	3	10	50.00
Safa	(Lebanon)	1 November 2011	2 August 2013	65	47	7	11	72.31
Erbil	(Iraq)	3 ِAugust 2013	4 September 2013	8	6	2	0	75.00
Al-Nasr	(Oman)	24 February 2014	5 May 2014	14	4	3	7	28.57
Baqa'a	(Jordan)	19 December 2014	26 February 2015	4	2	2	0	50.00
Iraq	(Iraq)	25 February 2015	17 June 2015	4	3	0	1	75.00
Al-Wehdat	(Jordan)	30 September 2015	27 December 2015	9	4	1	4	44.44
Al-Ramtha	(Jordan)	30 July 2016	22 November 2016	9	3	4	2	33.33
Erbil	(Iraq)	28 April 2019	5 October 2019	20	6	10	4	30.00
Total				315	179	66	70	56.83

== Honours ==
=== Manager ===
Tadamon Sour

- Lebanese FA Cup: 2001

Erbil

- Iraqi League: 2006-07

Al Wehdat

- Jordan Premier League: 2008-09
- Jordan FA Cup: 2008-09
- Jordan FA Shield: 2010
- Jordan Super Cup: 2009

Al-Tilal

- Yemeni Presidents Cup: 2010

Safa

- Lebanese Premier League: 2011-12, 2012-13
- Lebanese FA Cup: 2012-13
- Lebanese Elite Cup: 2012

Iraq

- West Asian Games: 2005

Individual

- Lebanese Premier League Best Coach: 2000–01, 2012–13
