= Zé Mário (footballer, born 1949) =

Brazilian footballer and manager

Personal information
- Full name: José Mário de Almeida Barros
- Date of birth: 1 February 1949 (age 77)
- Place of birth: Rio de Janeiro, Brazil
- Position: Midfielder

Senior career*
Years	Team	Apps	(Gls)
1970	Bonsucesso		
1971–1974	Flamengo		
1975	Fluminense		
1976–1979	Vasco da Gama		
1980–1982	Portuguesa		

Managerial career
- 1982–1983: Botafogo
- 1983: Figueirense
- 1984: Ceará
- 1984: Ferroviário
- 1985: Flamengo do Piauí
- 1985: Figueirense
- 1986: Iraq Youth Team
- 1987: Goiás
- 1988–1990: Al Ain
- 1991: Goiás
- 1992: Náutico
- 1992: Al-Arabi
- 1992: América
- 1993: Al-Arabi
- 1993–1995: Al-Riyadh
- 1995–1996: Saudi Arabia
- 1996–1997: Al-Riyadh
- 1997: Al-Sadd
- 1998–1999: Kashima Antlers
- 1998: Qatar
- 2000–2001: Internacional
- 2001–2002: Guarani
- 2003: Al-Ittifaq
- 2004: Al-Shabab
- 2005: Figueirense
- 2006–2008: Al Wasl
- 2008–2009: Al-Arabi
- 2009: Ajman
- * Club domestic league appearances and goals

José Mário de Almeida Barros (born 1 February 1949), commonly known as Zé Mário, is a Brazilian football manager and former player. He formerly coached the Al-Arabi Sports Club in Qatar.

== Career ==
Zé Mário was born in Rio de Janeiro. In summer 2008, he had served his contract with Al Wasl Club after two successful seasons, where he was able to win both the UAE League, and the UAE President Cup titles in the first season (2007–08). And was able to lead them to the final of the UAE President Cup for the second consecutive year in the second season, and he has also led them in their AFC Champions League journey which ended in the group stage.

Ze Mario has then moved back to the Qatari League with his past team Al-Arabi Sports Club after failing to sign a contract with his other past team Al-Shabab (Saudi Arabia) and was fired in January 2009.

== Managerial statistics ==
Team	From	To	Record				
Team	From	To	G	W	D	L	Win %
Kashima Antlers	1998	1999	35	21	1	13	60.00
Total			35	21	1	13	60.00
