= Najeh Humoud =

Iraqi footballer and coach

Personal information
- Full name: Najeh Humoud Hureib Al-Obaidi
- Date of birth: 1 July 1951 (age 75)
- Place of birth: Kufa, Iraq
- Position: Midfielder

Senior career*
Years	Team	Apps	(Gls)
- Al-Kufa

Managerial career
- 1988–1991: Al-Najaf
- 1993–2003: Al-Najaf
- * Club domestic league appearances and goals

Najeh Humoud (Arabic: ناجح حمود حريب) is a former football coach of Najaf FC and Iraq.

He played in midfield for Kufa FC in the 1970s, and the Najaf province team but never managed to play in the Iraqi first division. He began his coaching career with Najaf FC in 1987, and helped the club to their first ever cup in 1998 as his team beat Al-Shorta 4-0 at the Al Shaab Stadium to lift the Umm Al-Maarak Cup.

He went on to manage the Iraqi youth team in 1998 and worked as Zoran Smileski's assistant at the 1998 Asian Youth Championship.

Najeh then coached the Iraq national football team in 1999. He was Vice-President of the Iraq Football Association from 2004-2011 and the president of the Iraq Football Association from 2011 to 2014. Aside from football, Najih was also the director of the Kufa Cement Factory.
