= Yahya Alwan =

Iraqi footballer

Personal information
- Full name: Yahya Alwan Manhal
- Date of birth: 1 July 1957 (age 69)
- Place of birth: Baghdad, Iraq
- Position: Forward

Senior career*
| Years | Team | Apps | (Gls) |
| 1974–1984 | Al-Talaba | | |

International career
| 1977–1980 | Iraq | | |

Managerial career
- 1984–1985: Al-Talaba (assistant)
- 1985–1987: Al-Talaba
- 1985–1986: Iraq (assistant)
- 1986–1987: Iraq U17 (assistant)
- 1996–1997: Iraq
- 2002–2004: Al-Shaab
- 2004–2005: Erbil
- 2006: Al-Shorta
- 2005–2007: Iraq U23
- 2007–2008: Dibba Al-Fujairah
- 2008–2009: Al-Zawraa
- 2009–2010: Baghdad
- 2010–2011: Al-Talaba
- 2011–2012: Al-Zawraa
- 2013: Najaf
- 2013–2014: Karbala
- 2014–2015: Masafi Al-Wasat
- 2015: Iraq U23
- 2015–2016: Iraq
- 2018–2019: Al-Talaba
- 2019–2021: Al-Naft
- * Club domestic league appearances and goals

Yahya Alwan Manhal (Arabic: يَحْيَى عَلْوَان مَنْهَل, (born 1 July 1956 in Baghdad, Iraq) is a former Iraq national and Olympic coach, who is currently coach of Al-Naft

== Coaching career ==
He is an Iraqi football player and coach, born in 1956 in the capital of Iraq, the capital of Iraq. He has a master's degree in physical education. He started as an assistant coach in the Student Club in the year 1984 and then became a coach for Al-Talaba in 1985 and then trained the Salam and Al-Shorta and Erbil and in 1993 he trained a club Jordan's Al-Ahly then coached the Emirati Al-Shaab Club, Omani Club and the Emirati Fujairah Club and coached the Iraqi youth and Olympic team, and he became the coach of the Iraqi Olympic team in the Asian games of Doha 2006 and led him to win the silver medal. Several young players were discovered by Alwan in the Olympic team.

=== Al-Talaba ===
As a player, he won the Iraqi League with Al-Talaba in the two seasons 1980-1981 and 1981-1982 and as coach of the 1985-1986 season, and he brought the Al-Talaba to advanced positions in the 1992-1993 season.

=== National Teams ===
With the U-16, he won tournaments in Finland and Denmark, where the championship in Denmark overcame the final match of the U-16 of Barcelona, and the fourth in Asia in 1994 with the U-19, and led the Olympic team and qualified for the Seoul Olympics as an assistant to Amo Baba, and also the silver of the national patriarch won the Arab Football Cup and also won the Merdeka and Nahru championship and reached the quarter The final in the Asia Cup.

=== Outside Iraq ===
In Other Arab Countries, he did not win the titles, but worked and developed many teams, including the Jordanian Ahli, who reached the third Jordanian professional league, as well as the Al-Shaab in UAE, and discovered some well-known players, including the current goalkeeper of Al-Shaab and Mohamed Sorour, as well as coaching Fujairah in the second round and was a champion for the second round and finished in an advanced position for the league. Also developed the Omani Football Association by developing many teams, including Oman Club, which has built a good team under Alwan and then after in winning 7 trophies.

== Managerial statistics ==
As of 26 March 2021

| Team | Nat | From | To | Record | | | | |
| Team | Nat | From | To | G | W | D | L | Win % |
|---|---|---|---|---|---|---|---|---|
| Al-Talaba | (Iraq) | 1985 | 1986 | 20 | 13 | 4 | 3 | 65.00 |
| Iraq | (Iraq) | 24 November 1996 | 6 June 1997 | 20 | 16 | 1 | 3 | 80.00 |
| Iraq U-23 | (Iraq) | 2006 | 2007 | 45 | 26 | 13 | 6 | 57.78 |
| Dibba | (United Arab Emirates) | 25 November 2007 | 3 November 2008 | 27 | 8 | 4 | 15 | 29.63 |
| Al-Zawraa | (Iraq) | 8 December 2008 | 2009 | 19 | 8 | 6 | 5 | 42.11 |
| Baghdad | (Iraq) | 7 July 2009 | 2010 | 36 | 15 | 13 | 8 | 41.67 |
| Al-Talaba | (Iraq) | 12 August 2010 | 11 February 2011 | 14 | 6 | 6 | 2 | 42.86 |
| Al-Zawraa | (Iraq) | 2 December 2011 | 26 March 2012 | 13 | 6 | 4 | 3 | 46.15 |
| Najaf | (Iraq) | 10 March 2013 | 17 July 2013 | 7 | 3 | 2 | 2 | 42.86 |
| Karbala | (Iraq) | 20 September 2013 | 6 January 2014 | 9 | 1 | 3 | 5 | 11.11 |
| Masafi Al-Wasat | (Iraq) | 7 September 2014 | 17 February 2015 | 11 | 1 | 4 | 6 | 9.09 |
| Iraq U-23 | (Iraq) | 10 February 2015 | 1 August 2015 | 7 | 6 | 1 | 0 | 85.71 |
| Iraq | (Iraq) | 1 August 2015 | 24 March 2016 | 8 | 3 | 3 | 2 | 37.50 |
| Al-Talaba | (Iraq) | 28 July 2018 | 26 February 2019 | 30 | 11 | 14 | 5 | 36.67 |
| Al-Naft | (Iraq) | 27 July 2019 | 26 March 2021 | 64 | 28 | 25 | 11 | 43.75 |
| Total | | | | 330 | 151 | 103 | 76 | 45.76 |

== Honours ==
=== Club ===
Al-Talaba

- Iraqi Premier League: 1985–86

=== Country ===
Iraq U-20

- Fourth Place: 1994 Youth Championship

Iraq U-23

- Silver Medal: 2006 Asian Games

Iraq

- 1995 Pestabola Merdeka
- Quarter Final: 1996 Asian Cup
- 1997 Nehru Cup

=== Individual ===
- Asian Manager of the Month: April 1997
