= Radhi Shenaishil =

Iraqi footballer and coach

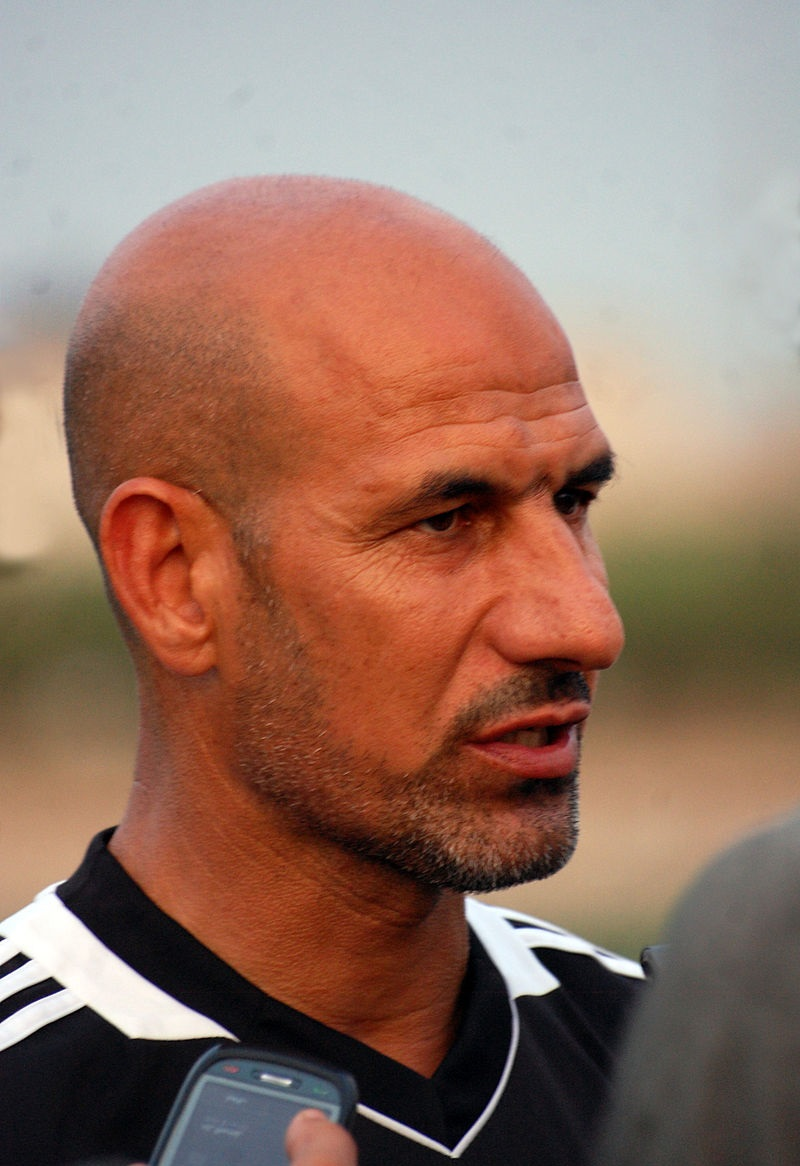

Personal information
- Full name: Radhi Shanaishil Swadi
- Date of birth: 30 June 1966 (age 60)
- Place of birth: Baghdad, Iraq
- Position: Defender

Senior career*
Years	Team	Apps	(Gls)
1982–1983	Al-Quwa Al-Jawiya		
1983–1991	Al-Zawraa		
1991–1993	Al-Quwa Al-Jawiya		
1993–1998	Al-Gharrafa		
1998–1999	Al-Sharjah		
1999–2001	Al-Sadd		
2001–2005	Qatar SC		
2005–2006	Al-Quwa Al-Jawiya		

International career
1985-1989	Iraq U20		
1988–1999	Iraq	80	(6)

Managerial career
- 2006–2007: Al-Quwa Al-Jawiya
- 2007–2008: Al-Zawraa
- 2009: Iraq
- 2009–2010: Al-Talaba
- 2010–2011: Al-Zawraa
- 2011–2012: Iraq U23
- 2012–2014: Al-Zawraa
- 2014–2015: Qatar SC
- 2014–2015: → Iraq (loan)
- 2016: Al-Shorta
- 2016–2017: Iraq
- 2017–2018: Al-Quwa Al-Jawiya
- 2018–2020: Naft Al-Wasat
- 2021: Al-Zawraa
- 2021–2022: Al-Quwa Al-Jawiya
- 2022: Iraq (interim)
- 2022–2024: Iraq U23
- 2025: Al-Kahraba
- * Club domestic league appearances and goals

Radhi Shenaishil Swadi (Arabic: راضي شنيشل سوادي; born 11 August 1966) is a former Iraqi footballer and former coach of the Iraq national football team.

== Playing career ==
Radhi Shenaishil was born and brought up in Al-Thawra City in Baghdad.

He captained an Iraqi Under 20s team and helped them to top their group which included Spain, Norway and Argentina, who they beat 1–0 with Radhi scoring the winner from a penalty against a side featuring Diego Simeone and Roberto Bonano in the FIFA World Youth Championship in Saudi Arabia in 1989.

The libero was voted into the Asian Cup select team XI at the 1996 Asian Cup with teammate Laith Hussein after helping Iraq to the quarter-finals.

In the summer of 1999, he retired from international football after the Pan-Arab Games final loss against hosts Jordan on penalties, where he scored Iraq's only penalty in a 3–1 shoot-out loss. In the same game he also scored an own-goal.

=== International goals ===
Scores and results list Iraq's goal tally first.

No	Date	Venue	Opponent	Score	Result	Competition
1.	18 June 1993	Chengdu Sports Centre, Chengdu	Pakistan	3–0	4–0	1994 FIFA World Cup qualification
2.	28 October 1993	Al-Ahly Stadium, Doha	Japan	1–1	2–2	1994 FIFA World Cup qualification
3.	11 August 1996	King Abdullah Stadium, Amman	Pakistan	3–0	3–0	1996 AFC Asian Cup qualification

== Managerial career ==
In March 2009, Shenaishil managed the Iraq national team for two friendly matches, against Saudi Arabia and South Korea. On 11 September 2014, Shenaishil was appointed as manager of Qatar Stars League club Qatar SC.

Months before the 2015 AFC Asian Cup started, Shenaishil was named as new Iraqi national team manager, replacing Hakeem Shaker whilst continuing as manager of Qatar SC. The first match under Shenaishil as Iraq coach was a 1–1 draw with Kuwait. He led the team in tournament to a 1–0 win over Jordan in opener and a 2–0 win over Palestine and also a 0–1 loss to Japan and finished as group runner-up behind Japan with six points. His side faced Iran in quarter-final and won 7–6 in penalties after 3–3 draw in extra time. In semi-finals, Iraq lost 0–2 to South Korea and then lost the third place match 3–2 to UAE. He returned to Qatar SC in February 2015, after the Asian Cup ended, but resigned on 26 October 2015.

On 15 April 2016, Shenaishil became the new coach of Iraq. in order to lead the team in the 2018 FIFA World Cup qualification – AFC third round. The team did not perform and after losing five out of seven games, he was sacked on April 10, 2017.

On 12 December 2018, Shenaishil became the new coach for Naft Al-Wasat SC, a big announcement for him to come back to the Iraqi league.

On 26 July 2022, Shenaishil was announced as the new head coach of the Iraq U23 team, after serving as interim coach of the Iraqi senior national team. In May 2024, he led Iraq to third place at the AFC U-23 Asian Cup in Qatar, securing qualification for the 2024 Summer Olympics in Paris. At the Olympics, Iraq finished third in Group B, recording a 2–1 victory over Ukraine but suffering defeats against Argentina and Morocco, resulting in elimination at the group stage.

== Managerial statistics ==
As of 26 October 2025

Team	From	To	Record				
Team	From	To	G	W	D	L	Win %
Al-Quwa Al-Jawiya	26 June 2006	18 July 2007	13	8	2	3	61.54
Al-Zawraa	13 August 2007	1 September 2008	30	15	8	7	50.00
Iraq (Interim)	22 February 2009	21 May 2009	2	0	1	1	0.00
Al-Talaba	14 July 2009	11 August 2010	38	20	12	6	52.63
Al-Zawraa	8 September 2010	16 August 2011	27	19	6	2	70.37
Iraq U-23	17 August 2011	14 March 2012	10	3	2	5	30.00
Al-Zawraa	26 March 2012	28 June 2014	84	38	25	21	45.24
Qatar SC	8 September 2014	24 October 2015	34	16	6	12	47.06
Iraq (Interim)	13 December 2014	21 February 2015	10	3	2	5	30.00
Al-Shorta	8 March 2016	8 May 2016	5	1	2	2	20.00
Iraq	20 April 2016	10 April 2017	15	2	3	10	13.33
Al-Quwa Al-Jawiya	27 November 2017	10 August 2018	48	30	13	5	62.50
Naft Al-Wasat	12 December 2018	16 June 2020	51	19	20	12	37.25
Al-Zawraa	3 January 2021	4 August 2021	43	24	14	5	55.81
Al-Quwa Al-Jawiya	7 November 2021	15 January 2022	13	5	4	4	38.46
Iraq (Interim)	25 August 2022	12 November 2022	4	1	2	1	25.00
Iraq U23	25 August 2022	30 July 2024	32	18	5	9	56.25
Al-Kahraba	31 January 2025	26 October 2025	26	7	8	11	26.92
Total			482	228	134	120	47.30

== Honours ==
=== As a player ===
Club

- Iraqi Premier League
  - Winner Al-Zawra'a SC 1990-1991
    - 1991–92 Iraqi League with Al-Quwa Al-JawiyaIraq FA Cup 1 *** 92
- Iraq FA Cup
  - Winner 5 times
    - 81, 82, 89, 90, 91 with Al-Zawra'a SC
    - 92 with Al-Quwa Al-Jawiya
- Al-Intisar Cup Winners
  - Winner 2 times
    - 84, 86 with Al-Zawra'a SC
- Arab Cooperation Council Championship Winners
  - Winner Once
    - 1989
- Qatar Emir Cup
  - Winner 5 times
    - 95, 96, 97, 98 with Al-Ittihad
    - 2000 with Al Sadd SC
- Qatari League
  - Winner Three Times
    - 1997/1998 with Al-Ittihad
    - 1999/2000 With Al Sadd Sc
    - 2002/2003 with Qatar SC
- Sheikh Jassim Cup
  - Winner 3 times
    - 2000 With Al Sadd SC
    - 2002, 2004 with Qatar SC

=== Club ===
Al-Zawraa

- Iraqi Premier League: 2010–11

=== International ===
Iraq

- AFC Asian Cup Fourth-place: 2015

Iraq U23

- WAFF U-23 Championship Champions: 2023
- AFC U-23 Asian Cup Third place: 2024
