= Hakeem Shaker =

Iraqi footballer and manager

Hakeem Shakir
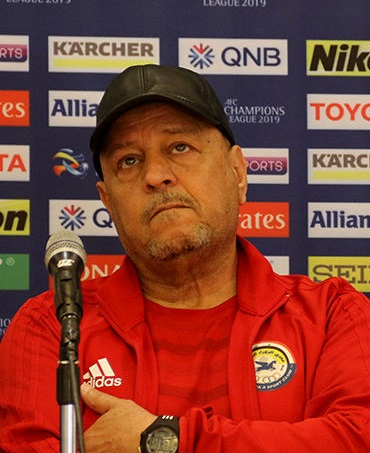

Personal information
- Full name: Hakeem Shaker Flayyih Al-Azzawi
- Date of birth: 7 January 1963 (age 63)
- Place of birth: Baghdad, Iraq

Youth career
- 1976–1978: Al-Jaish

Senior career*
| Years | Team | Apps | (Gls) |
| 1978–1979 | Al-Amana | | |
| 1979–1983 | Al-Talaba | | |
| 1984–1985 | Al-Shorta | | |

Managerial career
- 1991–1995: Al-Jaish
- 1996–1997: Samarra FC
- 1997–2001: Al-Difaa Al-Jawi
- 2002–2003: Erbil
- 2003–2005: Estiqlal Baghdad
- 2005–2006: Iraq U20 (Assistant)
- 2006–2007: Ararat
- 2008: Iraq U20
- 2010: Al-Shorta
- 2011–2013: Iraq U20
- 2012: Iraq U23
- 2012–2013: Iraq
- 2013–2014: Iraq
- 2014: Iraq U23
- 2015: Al-Shorta
- 2016–2017: Suwaiq Club
- 2018: Suwaiq Club
- 2019: Al-Zawraa
- 2021: Suwaiq Club
- 2021: Al-Faisaly SC
- 2022: Al-Quwa Al-Jawiya
Medal record
Men's football
Representing Iraq (as manager)
AFC U-19 Championship
| Runner-up | 2012 |
AFC U-23 Championship
| Winner | 2013 |
- * Club domestic league appearances and goals

Hakeem Shaker (Arabic: حكيم شاكر; born 7 January 1963 in Baghdad, Iraq), is a former Iraqi football player and manager. At some point between late 2012 and early 2013, Hakeem was the first and only Iraqi coach to manage three Iraqi national teams (Iraq senior team, Olympic team and Youth team) at the same time.

== Coaching career ==
=== Iraq U-20 ===
In 2011 Hakeem Shaker was appointed as Iraq U-20 coach and he led Iraq to qualify to the 2012 AFC U-19 Championship finals without any loss in the qualifications and reached the 2012 AFC U-19 Championship final undefeated, only to lose to South Korea on Penalty kicks 1-4 after 1–1 draw, leading Iraq to qualify to the 2013 FIFA U-20 World Cup in Turkey.

=== Iraq Olympic Team ===
In 2012 Hakeem was appointed as Iraq Olympic Team in the same time as being the coach of the Iraq U-20 coach. Hakeem lead the Olympic team to qualify to the 2013 AFC U-22 Asian Cup passing the qualifications without any loss.

=== Iraq national football team ===
In December 2012, after the resignation of Iraq national football team coach Zico, and being one week from the 2012 WAFF Championship kickoff, an emergency call made by Iraq Football Association to appoint Hakeem Shaker to be Iraq national football team temporary coach and caretaker until a new coach would be appointed. Hakeem led Iraq to reach the 2012 WAFF Championship final undefeated but lost the final to Syria 0–1. Later in January 2013, similar scenario occurred when Hakeem led Iraq to the 21st Arabian Gulf Cup finale after 4 Consecutive wins, defeating Saudi Arabia, Kuwait, Yemen, and Bahrain, but failing to defeat UAE in the final, UAE won in the extra time 1–2.

On January 24, 2013, Hakeem Shaker was supposed to be appointed officially as the Iraq national team head coach and to lead Iraq in the 2015 AFC Asian Cup qualification, however despite the win against Indonesia 1–0 in the first match in the qualifications, on February 8, 2013, Hakeem decided to leave the Iraq first team to another coach and focus on the Iraq U-20 team in the 2013 FIFA U-20 World Cup.

=== Iraq U-20 ===
In the 2013 FIFA U-20 World Cup Hakeem led Iraq to 4th place for the first time in Iraq history after winning Iraq's group over Chile 2–1, Egypt 2–1, and a draw with England 2-2. Then in the round of 16 Iraq won over Paraguay 1–0, then on quarterfinals won over the Asian champions South Korea on Penalty kicks 5-4 after a draw 3-3. However, in the semifinals Iraq lose on Penalty kicks 6-7 by Uruguay after a draw 1-1. In the 3rd place match Iraq had their first defeat to Ghana 0–3.

=== Iraq Olympic Team ===
On latter half of 2014, failed to win the 2014 Asian Games gold medal after Iraq U23 loss in the semi-finals against North Korea U23 in the 2014 Asian Games Although participated Younis Mahmoud & Salam Shaker and Mahdi Karim and most of the national team players. Then a poor results with two draw in friendly matches against Yemen and Bahrain and a defeat with Peru, and following Iraq defeat to Kuwait & UAE, draw against Oman in 22nd Arabian Gulf Cup, were eliminated in the group stages. Due to this after a run of poor results, the FA decided he sacked on 29 November 2014.

=== Al-Suwaiq ===
In October 2016, he signed with Oman Professional League team Al-Suwaiq, the club finished 6th in the league that season. On 26 March 2018, he returned to Al-Suwaiq with signing contract. the team was at the top of the league four points clear of the nearest rival before taking over. He ended up with winning the league with the Omani team.

=== Al-Zawraa ===
On 26 February 2019, Shaker signed for the Al-Zawraa, after the resignation of Ayoub Odisho. He led the team through the AFC Champions League. The team collected 8 points but failed to advance to the next round. The team made impressive games against Al-Wasl F.C. in two games winning 5-0 Karbala Sports City stadium, and 5–1 in Zabeel Stadium. And drawing with Zob Ahan SC 0–0 with 5 days to prepare. But also losing 4–1 to Al-Nassr FC. Zawraaqualified to the final by winning Amanat Baghdad 2–0, and Al-Quwa Al-Jawiya 4–1. The team played Al-Kahrabaa FC in the final and ended up winning 1-0 by the goal of Safaa Hadi.

== Managerial statistics ==
As of 7 April 2021

| Team | Nat | From | To | Record | | | | |
| Team | Nat | From | To | G | W | D | L | Win % |
|---|---|---|---|---|---|---|---|---|
| Al-Jaish SC (Baghdad) | (Iraq) | 1992 | 1994 | 129 | 51 | 45 | 33 | 39.53 |
| Al-Difaa Al-Jawi | (Iraq) | 1999 | 2000 | 30 | 13 | 9 | 8 | 43.33 |
| Iraq U20 | (Iraq) | May 2008 | November 2008 | 12 | 3 | 5 | 4 | 25.00 |
| Iraq U20 | (Iraq) | April 2011 | July 2013 | 42 | 23 | 8 | 11 | 54.76 |
| Iraq U23 | (Iraq) | June 2012 | July 2012 | 5 | 3 | 2 | 0 | 60.00 |
| Iraq | (Iraq) | December 2012 | February 2013 | 12 | 7 | 2 | 3 | 58.33 |
| Iraq | (Iraq) | 12 September 2013 | 4 January 2014 | 12 | 5 | 3 | 4 | 41.67 |
| Iraq U23 | (Iraq) | 4 January 2014 | 8 October 2014 | 13 | 12 | 0 | 1 | 92.31 |
| Iraq | (Iraq) | 7 November 2014 | 29 November 2014 | 3 | 0 | 1 | 2 | 0.00 |
| Al-Shorta SC | (Iraq) | 12 July 2015 | 20 October 2015 | 6 | 2 | 0 | 4 | 33.33 |
| Suwaiq Club | (Oman) | 28 October 2016 | 27 May 2017 | 35 | 15 | 12 | 8 | 42.86 |
| Suwaiq Club | (Oman) | 20 March 2018 | 3 June 2018 | 13 | 8 | 1 | 4 | 61.54 |
| Al-Zawraa | (Iraq) | 26 February 2019 | 19 September 2019 | 36 | 14 | 12 | 10 | 38.89 |
| Suwaiq Club | (Oman) | 7 February 2021 | 7 April 2021 | 6 | 2 | 2 | 2 | 33.33 |
| Al-Faisaly SC | (Jordan) | 8 August 2021 | 21 August 2021 | 3 | 2 | 0 | 1 | 66.67 |
| Total | | | | 317 | 143 | 94 | 80 | 45.11 |

== Managerial honours ==
=== Club ===
Al-Jaish FC (Iraq)

- Iraq FA Cup: 1994-1995 (Runner Up)

Al-Difaa Al-Jawi

- Al-Quds International Championship: 1999

Ararat

- Kurdistan Regional Cup: 2006

Al-Suwaiq

- Sultan Qaboos Cup: 2016-17
- Oman Professional League: 2017-18

Al-Zawraa

- Iraq FA Cup: 2018-19

=== International ===
Iraq U-23

- AFC U-23 Championship: 2013
- Asian Games: 2014 (Bronze Medal)
