= Wathiq Naji =

Iraqi football manager

Personal information
- Full name: Wathik Naji Jassim Al-Kaissi
- Date of birth: 1 July 1940
- Place of birth: Baghdad, Iraq
- Date of death: 20 November 2014 (aged 74)
- Place of death: Baghdad, Iraq
- Position: Midfielder

Managerial career
- Years: Team
- 1974: Iraq
- 1975: Iraq
- 1980: Iraq
- 1985: Iraq
- 1985–1986: Al-Zawraa
- 1986–1989: Al-Naft
- 1988: Iraq U17
- 1991–1992: Al-Najaf
- 2008–2009: Sabah FA

Wathiq Naji Jassim Al-Kaissi (Arabic: وَاثِق نَاجِي جَاسِم الْقَيْسِيّ; 1 July 1940 – 20 November 2014) was an Iraqi football manager, who took the team to the 1986 edition of the FIFA World Cup, their first and only appearance in the competition.

Wathiq died on 20 November 2014 at the age of 74 from a heart attack in Canada.
