= 2008–09 Al-Zawraa SC season =

Al-Zawraa
2008–09 season
- Chairman: (Iraq) Salam Hashim
- Manager: (Iraq) Yahya Alwan
- Iraqi Premier League 2008-09: 4th (Group B)
- AFC Cup 2009: Round of 16
- Top goalscorer: League: (Iraq) Salar Abdul-Jabar (8); All: (Iraq) Salar Abdul-Jabar (9)

This is a list of Al-Zawraa's results at the Iraqi Premier League 2008-09 and AFC Cup 2009. The club is competing in the Iraqi Premier League and AFC Cup.

== Al-Zawraa’s massive problems ==
=== Financial problems ===
Before the start of the 2008-09 season, The Iraq Football Association announced that they are no longer able to afford financing the Iraqi clubs and hence each club had to get an official sponsor. Since the Iraqi clubs are based on institutions, military bases and ministries, Al-Zawraa's official sponsor is Ministry of Transport.

The Problem began when Amer Abdul-Jabbar, the Minister of Transport offered financing the club but in exchange of changing the club's name From Al-Zawraa to Transport. But when Al-Zawraa fans heard this news, 8 million Iraqis announced their Civil disobedience if they change Al-Zawraa name. Even the Iraq Football Association refused the idea of changing Al-Zawraa's name. Salam Hashim the current President of the club made a middle Solution to change Al-Zawraa name from Al-Zawra to Al-Zawraa Transport, both the fans and the Minister of Transport refused the idea.

=== Withdrawal threats ===
In the middle of the 2008-09 season, Salam Hashim announced that Al-Zawraa will withdraw from the Iraqi League and the AFC Cup if no one give Al-Zawraa a helping hand, but the Prime Minister of Iraq Nouri al-Maliki reacted and gave Al-Zawraa 10 Million Iraqi Dinars for their camping in the Iraqi League and the AFC Cup, he promised monthly finance backing.

=== Transfer problems ===
At the beginning of the season. Al-Zawraa had to sell their key players like top scorer Abdul-Salam Abood, the Defensive Midfielder Mohannad Nassir and the main goalkeeper Ahmad Ali Jaber due to financial problems. They bought only young players and using some from Al-Zawraa's youth team. But in a brave act from the Iraq national football team’s goalkeeper Mohammed Gassid who moved to Al-Zawraa for a cheap salary saying he doesn’t care about the money and he loves Al-Zawraa and playing for Al-Zawraa is like a dream to him. Similar act happened from Haidar Sabah who preferred to come back to Al-Zawraa instead of extending his contract with Arbil FC, the richest team in Iraq.

Before the winter transfers period, the 34-year-old striker and the son of the club Hesham Mohammed promised that he will come back to Al-Zawraa and try to help them with his experience. Hesham is famous in wearing number 8 and when he asked what is the number he will pick, he answered that Haidar Sabah earned this number and he will choose another number, thinking of picking number 88. In the winter transfers period he fulfilled his promise and signed for Al-Zawraa.

=== Banning the whole team ===
Before the end of the season, Al-Zawra’s President Salam Hashim banned 25 players for playing for Al-Zawra. The story began when 15 players asked for their wages, complaining that they didn’t receive any money in the last three months. But Salam Hashim blamed the Ministry of Transport for not supporting Al-Zawra and he told the players that he doesn’t have any money in the moment and he will give them next season, the players refused to play giving the reason that they are human and they need to eat and to pay for their houses rent. The rest of the team stood up solidarity with the team, which made Salam Hashim banning the whole team. Al-Zawra had 4 postponed matches and if Al-Zawra win them all Al-Zawra would reach the second place in Group B which it will makes them the play the decisive 3rd-4th place match. The Team played the postponed matches with the u-16 team with Ahmad Salam Hashim the son of Salam Hashim being the Captain of the team. Al-Zawra lost three matches and draw one.

== 2008-09 squad and starting lineup ==

**2008-2009 starting lineup.**

Note: Flags indicate national team as defined under FIFA eligibility rules; some limited exceptions apply. Players may hold more than one non-FIFA nationality.

No.	Pos.	Nation	Player
1	GK	IRQ	Osama Hussien Ali
2	DF	IRQ	Amer Khalif
3	MF	IRQ	Mohammed Najm
4	DF	IRQ	Akram Sattar Jabar
5	MF	IRQ	Hasan Zaboon
6	DF	IRQ	**Ous Ibrahim**
7	MF	IRQ	Ali Yousif
8	MF	IRQ	**Haidar Sabah**
9	FW	IRQ	Omar Kadhim
10	FW	IRQ	Hussam Saeed
11	MF	IRQ	Nasim Jassim
12	MF	IRQ	Mohammed Fadhel
13	DF	IRQ	Omar Sabah Jassim
14	FW	IRQ	Mohammed Abdul-Jabar
15	DF	IRQ	**Gaith Abdul-Ghani** (captain)
16	MF	IRQ	Abbas Hussein Rehema

No.	Pos.	Nation	Player
17	DF	IRQ	Ahmad Salam Hashim
18	DF	IRQ	Adnan Attiya
19	MF	IRQ	Salar Abdul-Jabar
20	MF	IRQ	Sinan Fawzi
21	FW	IRQ	Marwan Hussein
22	GK	IRQ	Ammar Ali Al-Azzawi
23	FW	IRQ	Mustafa Ahmad
24	GK	IRQ	**Mohammed Gassid**
25	MF	IRQ	Ahmad Ibrahim
26	MF	IRQ	Thamer Fouad
27	FW	IRQ	Mezher Ahmad
28	MF	IRQ	Sajjad Hussein
29	DF	IRQ	Ali Kamel
30	FW	IRQ	Mussa Sattar Hashim
88	FW	IRQ	**Hesham Mohammed**

Bold = National team players

=== Changes in ===
No.	Position	Player	Age	Moving from	League	Transfer Window
1	GK	(Iraq) Osama Hussien Ali	22	Al-Talaba	Iraqi Premier League	Summer
8	MF	(Iraq) Haidar Sabah	23	Arbil FC	Iraqi Premier League	Summer
24	GK	(Iraq) Mohammed Gassid	22	Al-Shorta	Iraqi Premier League	Summer
27	FW	(Iraq) Mezher Ahmad	23	Samaraa FC	Iraqi Premier League	Summer
88	FW	(Iraq) Hesham Mohammed	34	Jableh SC	Syrian League	Winter

=== Changes out ===
No.	Position	Player	Age	Moving to	League	Transfer Window
1	GK	(Iraq) Ahmad Ali Jaber	27	Arbil FC	Iraqi Premier League	Summer
10	FW	(Iraq) Abdul-Salam Abood	22	Al-Talaba	Iraqi Premier League	Summer
16	MF	(Iraq) Mohannad Nassir	26	Dohuk FC	Iraqi Premier League	Summer
30	GK	(Iraq) Sarmad Rasheed	27	Al-Amana	Iraqi Premier League	Summer

== Iraqi Premier League ==
The 2008-09 season is the 35th edition of the Iraqi Premier League, it starts on 1 November 2008 and is scheduled to end on 10 May 2009. 28 teams from all over the country are competing for the title. Arbil FC are the defending champion and Al-Zawraa are the runner-up.

The IFA decided to cancel the old group system, which was used from 2004 until 2008. This time, the 28 teams will be divided into two groups with each 14 teams. There will be a northern and southern group, with the clubs from the capital Baghdad being drawn into either one of these groups. After playing home and away games, the two group winners are going to play for the League Title in a final. The two runners-up are playing for the third place and a spot at the 2009-10 Arab Champions League. The league champions and runner-up will qualify for the 2010 AFC Cup. Furthermore, it was announced that this will be the last season featuring groups.

Al-Zawraa is grouped in Group B.

=== Group B standing ===
Pos	Team	Pld	W	D	L	GF	GA	GD	Pts	Qualification
2	Al-Amana	24	13	11	0	37	15	+22	50	Qualified to Third place match
3	Al-Talaba	24	14	5	5	32	15	+17	47	
4	Al-Zawraa	24	9	9	6	30	24	+6	36	
5	Naft Al-Junoob	24	9	9	6	27	23	+4	36	
6	Al-Minaa	24	10	6	8	20	24	−4	36	

Source: Goalzz
Rules for classification: 1) points; 2) goal difference; 3) number of goals scored.

=== Results summary ===
Overall								Home						Away					
Pld	W	D	L	GF	GA	GD	Pts	W	D	L	GF	GA	GD	W	D	L	GF	GA	GD
24	9	9	6	30	24	+6	36	4	4	4	15	15	0	5	5	2	15	9	+6

=== Results by round ===
Round	1	2	3	4	5	6	7	8	9	10	11	12	13	14	15	16	17	18	19	20	21	22	23	24
Ground	H	A	H	A	H	A	H	A	A	H	H	A	A	H	A	H	A	H	A	H	H	A	A	H
Result	W	D	D	L	D	D	L	W	W	W	W	W	L	D	D	L	D	L	W	D	L	D	W	W

Updated to match(es) played on 19 June 2009. Source: "Goalzz.com". Archived from the original on 21 April 2009.
A = Away; H = Home; W = Win; D = Draw; L = Loss

=== Matches ===
#	Date	Home	Score	Away	Goal(s)
1	1 November 2008	Al-Zawraa	4-1	Al-Minaa	Mezher Ahmad 17' 38' - Haidar Sabah 50' - Mustafa Ahmad 75'
2	7 November 2008	Al-Sinaa	0-0	Al-Zawraa	
3	15 November 2008	Al-Zawraa	1-1	Maysan	Ous Ibrahim 17'
4	22 November 2008	Naft Al-Janoob	2-1	Al-Zawraa	Mezher Ahmad 47'
5	6 December 2008	Al-Zawraa	2-2	Kufa	Sajjad Hussein 50' - Gaith Abdul-Ghani 94'
6	13 December 2008	Al-Amana	1-1	Al-Zawraa	Ahmad Ibrahim 28'
7	19 December 2008	Al-Zawraa	0-1	Al-Talaba	
8	26 December 2008	Karbalaa	0-1	Al-Zawraa	Mustafa Ahmad 86'
9	2 January 2009	Najaf	1-2	Al-Zawraa	Salar Abdul-Jabar 61', 74'
10	12 January 2009	Al-Zawraa	1-0	Samawa	Mustafa Ahmad 29'
11	17 January 2009	Al-Zawraa	3-1	Al-Bareed	Mustafa Ahmad 27' - Haidar Sabah 43' - Salar Abdul-Jabar 60'
12	24 January 2009	Nassriya	1-2	Al-Zawraa	Salar Abdul-Jabar 14', 69'
13	21 February 2009	Al-Minaa	1-0	Al-Zawraa	
14	27 February 2009	Al-Zawraa	1-1	Al-Sinaa	Ahmad Ibrahim 48'
15	10 June 2009	Maysan	1-1	Al-Zawraa	Marwan Hussein 5'
16	13 June 2009	Al-Zawraa	1-3	Naft Al-Janoob	Hesham Mohammed 6'
17	28 March 2009	Kufa	0-0	Al-Zawraa	
18	12 April 2009	Al-Zawraa	0-2	Al-Amana	
19	16 June 2009	Al-Talaba	0-2	Al-Zawraa	Haidar Sabah 56' - Mustafa Ahmad 66'
20	16 April 2009	Al-Zawraa	0-0	Karbalaa	
21	16 June 2009	Al-Zawraa	0-2	Najaf	
22	30 April 2009	Samawa	1-1	Al-Zawraa	Salar Abdul-Jabar 19'
23	11 May 2009	Al-Bareed	1-4	Al-Zawraa	Ali Yousif 43' - Salar Abdul-Jabar 43', 83' - Omar Kadhim 71'
24	1 June 2009	Al-Zawraa	2-1	Nassriya	Haidar Sabah 13' - Mustafa Ahmad 31'

- Pos = Postponed

=== Top scorers ===
#	Pos	Player name	Goal(s)
1	FW	(Iraq) Salar Abdul-Jabar	8
2	FW	(Iraq) Mustafa Ahmad	6
3	MF	(Iraq) Haidar Sabah	4
4	FW	(Iraq) Mezher Ahmad	3
5	MF	(Iraq) Ahmad Ibrahim	2
6	FW	(Iraq) Hesham Mohammed	1
6	FW	(Iraq) Omar Kadhim	1
6	FW	(Iraq) Marwan Hussein	1
6	MF	(Iraq) Ali Yousif	1
6	MF	(Iraq) Sajjad Hussein	1
6	DF	(Iraq) Ous Ibrahim	1
6	DF	(Iraq) Gaith Abdul-Ghani	1

== AFC Cup ==
Iraq was excluded from the AFC Champions League due to not fulfilling the AFC demand of having a fully professional league. Hence, the Iraqi clubs relegated to the AFC Cup with having 2 seats to participate in. The 2007-08 Iraqi Premier League's Champion and runners-up will participate this season.

Al-Zawraa as runner-up in the previous season will take part in the AFC Cup for the first time in their history alongside Arbil FC as last season champions.

=== Group B ===
Team	Pld	W	D	L	GF	GA	GD	Pts
(Iraq) Al-Zawraa	6	4	1	1	8	3	+5	13
(Lebanon) Safa	6	4	0	2	5	3	+2	12
(Yemen) Al-Hilal Al-Sahili	6	2	1	3	5	7	−2	7
(Oman) Al-Suwaiq	6	1	0	5	3	8	−5	3

2009-03-10
19:00 UTC+3

Al-Zawraa (Iraq)	2 – 0	(Yemen) Al-Hilal Al-Sahili
Salar Abdul-Jabar 6'; Omar Kadhim 88'	Summary; Report

Al-Maktoum Stadium, Dubai, UAE
Attendance: 150
Referee: (United Arab Emirates) Mohamed Al Zarouni

2009-03-17
18:00 UTC+3

Safa (Lebanon)	1 – 0	(Iraq) Al-Zawraa
Guy Charles Jimgou 35'	Report

Beirut Municipal Stadium, Beirut
Attendance: 700
Referee: (Uzbekistan) Vladislav Tseytlin

2009-04-07
19:00 UTC+3

Al-Zawraa (Iraq)	2 – 0	(Oman) Al-Suwaiq
Haidar Sabah 29'; Sajjad Hussein 90+3'	Report

Al-Maktoum Stadium, Dubai, UAE
Attendance: 200
Referee: (Iran) Saeid Mozaffarizadehyazdi

2009-04-21
19:15 UTC+4

Al-Suwaiq (Oman)	0 – 1	(Iraq) Al-Zawraa
	Report	Ahmad Ibrahim 56'

Seeb Stadium, Seeb
Attendance: 500
Referee: (Jordan) Mohammad Mousa Khalaf

2009-05-05
15:45 UTC+3

Al-Hilal Al-Sahili (Yemen)	1 – 1	(Iraq) Al-Zawraa
Yaser Ba Suhai 76'	Report	Adnan Attiya 85'

Ali Mohsen Al-Muraisi Stadium, Sanaa
Attendance: 1,000
Referee: (Syria) Racho Abdulrrhman

2009-05-19
19:00 UTC+3

Al-Zawraa (Iraq)	2 – 1	(Lebanon) Safa
Ous Ibrahim 45+2'; Mustafa Ahmad 90+5'	Report	Khodor Salame 31'

Al-Maktoum Stadium, Dubai, UAE
Attendance: 300
Referee: (Turkmenistan) Kakabay Seydov

=== Round of 16 ===
2009-05-26
18:00 UTC+3

Al-Zawraa (Iraq)	1 – 3	(Iraq) Arbil
Adnan Attiya 76'	Report	Ahmad Salah 44'; Luay Salah 67'; Ahmad Abd Ali 70'

Al-Maktoum Stadium, Dubai, UAE
Attendance: 200
Referee: (Qatar) Abdulrahman Abdou

=== Top scorers (AFC Cup) ===
#	Pos	Player Name	Goal(s)
1	DF	(Iraq) Adnan Attiya	2
2	FW	(Iraq) Salar Abdul-Jabar	1
2	FW	(Iraq) Mustafa Ahmad	1
2	FW	(Iraq) Omar Kadhim	1
2	MF	(Iraq) Haidar Sabah	1
2	MF	(Iraq) Sajjad Hussein	1
2	MF	(Iraq) Ahmad Ibrahim	1
2	DF	(Iraq) Ous Ibrahim	1
