= 2007–08 Iraqi Premier League =

Iraqi Premier League
- Season: 2007–08
- Champions: Erbil (2nd title)
- Relegated: Al-Furat; Sirwan; Al-Jaish; Al-Shuala; Al-Adala; Al-Shatra; Zakho
- AFC Cup: Erbil; Al-Zawraa
- Arab Champions League: Al-Quwa Al-Jawiya
- Top goalscorer: Asaad Abdul-Nabi (14 goals)
- Biggest home win: Karbala 5–0 Al-Furat (7 December 2007)
- Biggest away win: Al-Jaish 1–8 Al-Kahrabaa (15 December 2007); Al-Shuala 0–7 Al-Quwa Al-Jawiya (18 December 2007)
- Highest scoring: Al-Ramadi 2–7 Al-Quwa Al-Jawiya (8 December 2007); Al-Jaish 1–8 Al-Kahrabaa (15 December 2007); Al-Shuala 0–7 Al-Quwa Al-Jawiya (18 December 2007); Al-Quwa Al-Jawiya 6–3 Kirkuk (17 July 2008)

The 2007–08 Iraqi Premier League season started on 26 November 2007 and ended on 24 August 2008. The season saw Erbil crowned as champions for the second time in a row, beating Al-Zawraa 1–0 after extra time in the final.

For security reasons, the league was divided into three groups: South, North and Central. The top six clubs from the Central Group and the top four clubs from the North and South Groups qualified for the Elite Stage. The Elite Stage consisted of three groups, of which the winners and one runner-up qualified for the Golden Stage, a knockout contest. The Golden Stage matches were held at Al-Shaab Stadium in Baghdad.

The champions and runners-up qualified for the 2009 AFC Cup, while third-placed Al-Quwa Al-Jawiya qualified for the 2008–09 Arab Champions League.

== New rule ==
The Iraq Football Association introduced a new rule that allowed clubs to make four substitutions instead of three.

== Group stage ==
=== North Group ===
Pos	Team	Pld	W	D	L	GF	GA	GD	Pts	Qualification or relegation
1	Erbil	14	9	4	1	21	5	+16	31	Qualified to Elite Stage
2	Duhok	14	9	3	2	16	6	+10	30	Qualified to Elite Stage
3	Pires	14	6	4	4	20	16	+4	22	Qualified to Elite Stage
4	Kirkuk	14	6	3	5	18	17	+1	21	Qualified to Elite Stage
5	Sulaymaniya	14	4	7	3	16	17	−1	19	
6	Samarra	14	3	5	6	10	16	−6	14	
7	Sirwan	14	2	4	8	9	14	−5	10	Relegated to the Iraqi First Division League
8	Zakho	14	0	4	10	5	24	−19	4	Relegated to the Iraqi First Division League

Source: Goalzz

Note: Al-Mosul withdrew from the league.

==== Results ====
Home \ Away	ERB	DUH	KRK	PIR	SMR	SIR	SUL	ZKO
Erbil		0–1	2–0	1–0	4–1	1–0	4–0	0–0
Duhok	1–2		0–1	2–1	0–0	2–1	2–1	1–0
Kirkuk	0–2	0–1		2–3	1–0	3–1	2–2	2–0
Pires	1–1	0–2	1–1		2–0	0–0	3–3	3–0 (Note: Zakho's matches with Pires (1–1) and Duhok (0–0) were both awarded as 3–0 defeats for Zakho as a penalty for using an ineligible player.)
Samarra	1–2	0–1	1–1	2–0		0–2	1–1	3–2
Sirwan	0–0	0–0	0–1	0–1	0–1		1–2	3–0
Sulaymaniya	0–0	0–0	3–1	1–3	0–0	2–0		1–0
Zakho	0–2	0–3	1–3	1–2	0–0	1–1	0–0	

Source: Goalzz
Legend: Blue = home team win; Yellow = draw; Red = away team win.

=== Central Group ===
Pos	Team	Pld	W	D	L	GF	GA	GD	Pts	Qualification or relegation
1	Al-Shorta	22	13	8	1	40	14	+26	47	Qualified to Elite Stage
2	Al-Quwa Al-Jawiya	22	14	4	4	42	13	+29	46	Qualified to Elite Stage
3	Al-Kahrabaa	22	10	8	4	30	10	+20	38	Qualified to Elite Stage
4	Al-Zawraa	22	10	7	5	24	12	+12	37	Qualified to Elite Stage
5	Al-Talaba	22	9	9	4	25	17	+8	36	Qualified to Elite Stage
6	Al-Sinaa	22	9	8	5	24	16	+8	35	Qualified to Elite Stage
7	Al-Bareed	22	8	6	8	25	29	−4	30	
8	Al-Naft	22	6	9	7	18	24	−6	27	
9	Al-Ramadi	22	5	6	11	26	42	−16	21	
10	Al-Jaish	22	3	6	13	14	39	−25	15	Relegated to the Iraqi First Division League
11	Al-Shuala	22	3	4	15	14	44	−30	13	Relegated to the Iraqi First Division League
12	Al-Adala	22	3	3	16	11	33	−22	12	Relegated to the Iraqi First Division League

Source: Goalzz

==== Results ====
Home \ Away	ADL	BRD	JSH	KAH	NFT	JAW	RAM	SHO	SHL	SIN	TAL	ZAW
Al-Adala		2–1	0–2	0–3	0–0	0–1	0–2	0–1	0–1	0–2	2–3	1–1
Al-Bareed	2–0		1–0	1–0	1–0	0–2	3–3	1–4	1–1	3–2	0–0	2–2
Al-Jaish	1–0	0–1		1–8	2–2	0–3	1–3	0–3	0–0	0–1	0–0	0–2
Al-Kahrabaa	1–1	4–2	2–0		0–1	1–0	1–0	1–1	1–0	0–1	2–0	0–0
Al-Naft	2–1	1–0	2–2	0–0		0–0	3–1	1–1	2–1	0–0	0–2	1–2
Al-Quwa Al-Jawiya	0–1	1–1	1–0	0–1	2–0		3–1	1–1	3–0 (Note: The Al-Quwa Al-Jawiya–Al-Shuala match was awarded as a 3–0 win to Al-Quwa Al-Jawiya, as Al-Shuala did not turn up for the game.)	2–0	1–1	1–0
Al-Ramadi	1–0	2–1	1–2	0–4	2–2	2–7		1–1	1–2	0–2	0–1	0–0
Al-Shorta	3–1	2–0	4–1	0–0	3–0	2–0	4–2		2–1	0–0	1–2	1–0
Al-Shuala	1–2	0–1	1–1	1–0	0–1	0–7	2–3	0–3		1–3	1–3	0–5
Al-Sinaa	2–0	1–2	1–0	1–1	3–0	0–2	0–0	1–1	1–1		2–2	1–0
Al-Talaba	2–0	2–1	1–1	0–0	1–0	1–2	1–1	0–0	3–0	0–0		0–1
Al-Zawraa	1–0	0–0	2–0	0–0	0–0	1–3	2–0	1–2	1–0	1–0	2–0	

Source: Goalzz
Legend: Blue = home team win; Yellow = draw; Red = away team win.

=== South Group ===
Pos	Team	Pld	W	D	L	GF	GA	GD	Pts	Qualification or relegation
1	Karbala	16	12	2	2	27	12	+15	38	Qualified to Elite Stage
2	Al-Najaf	16	9	5	2	23	9	+14	32	Qualified to Elite Stage
3	Al-Minaa	16	8	6	2	19	10	+9	30	Qualified to Elite Stage
4	Naft Al-Junoob	16	5	6	5	16	14	+2	21	Qualified to Elite Stage
5	Maysan	16	4	7	5	16	17	−1	19	
6	Al-Kufa	16	4	5	7	13	15	−2	17	
7	Al-Samawa	16	3	7	6	11	18	−7	16	
8	Al-Furat	16	4	2	10	17	33	−16	14	Relegated to the Iraqi First Division League
9	Al-Shatra	16	2	2	12	12	26	−14	8	Relegated to the Iraqi First Division League

Source: Goalzz

==== Results ====
Home \ Away	FUR	KUF	MIN	NJF	SAM	SHT	KRB	MAY	NFJ
Al-Furat		1–4	1–0	1–2	3–0	2–1	2–4	1–3	0–2
Al-Kufa	0–0		0–1	0–1	1–0	3–2	1–2	2–2	1–0
Al-Minaa	2–0	2–0		0–0	2–0	1–0	2–1	2–1	3–3
Al-Najaf	3–1	0–0	0–1		2–0	1–0	2–1	4–1	3–0
Al-Samawa	2–1	1–0	0–0	1–1		1–0	0–0	1–1	1–1
Al-Shatra	2–3	1–0	1–1	1–3	2–2		1–2	0–2	0–1
Karbala	5–0	2–1	2–1	0–0	1–0	1–0		1–0	2–1
Maysan	1–1	0–0	1–1	2–1	1–1	0–1	0–1		1–0
Naft Al-Junoob	2–0	0–0	0–0	0–0	2–1	3–0	1–2	0–0	

Source: Goalzz
Legend: Blue = home team win; Yellow = draw; Red = away team win.

== Elite stage ==
=== Group 1 ===
Pos	Team	Pld	W	D	L	GF	GA	GD	Pts	Qualification	ERB	JAW	KRK	MIN	SIN
1	Erbil	8	4	2	2	9	5	+4	14	Qualified to Semi-finals		1–0	1–0	2–2	1–0
2	Al-Quwa Al-Jawiya	8	4	1	3	10	8	+2	13	Qualified to Semi-final playoff	2–1		6–3	1–0	1–0
3	Kirkuk	8	3	1	4	8	9	−1	10		1–0	2–0		2–0	0–0
4	Al-Minaa	8	2	3	3	6	8	−2	9		0–0	1–0	1–0		1–1
5	Al-Sinaa	8	2	3	3	4	7	−3	9		0–3	0–0	1–0	2–1	

Source: Goalzz

=== Group 2 ===
Pos	Team	Pld	W	D	L	GF	GA	GD	Pts	Qualification	DUH	KRB	TAL	NFJ	KAH
1	Duhok	8	5	3	0	12	3	+9	18	Qualified to Semi-finals		0–0	2–0	1–0	2–2
2	Karbala	8	4	4	0	9	4	+5	16	Qualified to Semi-final playoff	0–0		1–1	2–0	2–1
3	Al-Talaba	8	1	4	3	4	7	−3	7		0–1	0–0		0–1	2–2
4	Naft Al-Junoob	8	2	1	5	6	11	−5	7		1–2	1–2	0–0		2–1
5	Al-Kahrabaa	8	1	2	5	10	16	−6	5		0–4	1–2	0–1	3–1	

Source: Goalzz

=== Group 3 ===
Pos	Team	Pld	W	D	L	GF	GA	GD	Pts	Qualification	ZAW	NJF	SHO	PIR
1	Al-Zawraa	6	4	1	1	11	5	+6	13	Qualified to Semi-finals		0–1	1–1	2–0
2	Al-Najaf	6	3	2	1	7	4	+3	11	Qualified to Semi-final playoff	2–3		3–1	0–0
3	Al-Shorta	6	1	2	3	5	9	−4	5		1–3	0–1		2–1
4	Pires	6	0	3	3	1	6	−5	3		0–2	0–0	0–0	

Source: Goalzz

== Semi-final playoff ==
Pos	Team	Pld	W	D	L	GF	GA	GD	Pts	Qualification	JAW	NJF	KRB
1	Al-Quwa Al-Jawiya	2	1	0	1	3	3	0	3	Qualified to Semi-finals			0–1
2	Al-Najaf	2	1	0	1	3	3	0	3		2–3 (a.e.t.) (Note: 2–1 to Al-Quwa Al-Jawiya after normal time; 3–2 to Al-Quwa Al-Jawiya after extra time; Al-Quwa Al-Jawiya won 8–7 on penalties.)		
3	Karbala	2	1	0	1	1	1	0	3			0–1	

Source: Goalzz

== Golden stage ==
Semi-finals
20 August 2008
Al-Zawraa	1
Duhok	0
21 August 2008
Erbil	2
Al-Quwa Al-Jawiya	0

Final
24 August 2008
Al-Zawraa	0
Erbil (a.e.t.)	1
Third place
23 August 2008
Al-Quwa Al-Jawiya	3
Duhok	0

=== Semi-finals ===
20 August 2008
14:00 GMT

Al-Zawraa	1–0	Duhok
Abboud 75' (pen.)

Al-Shaab Stadium, Baghdad

21 August 2008
14:05 GMT

Erbil	2–0	Al-Quwa Al-Jawiya
L. Salah 28'; A. Salah 53'

Al-Shaab Stadium, Baghdad
Referee: Alaa Abdul-Qadir

=== Third place match ===
23 August 2008
14:00 GMT

Al-Quwa Al-Jawiya	3–0	Duhok
Radhi 5'; Khalid 42'; Zwaid 82'

Al-Shaab Stadium, Baghdad

=== Final ===
24 August 2008
16:30 GMT

Al-Zawraa	0–1 (a.e.t.)	Erbil
		A. Salah 99'

Al-Shaab Stadium, Baghdad
Attendance: 50,000
Referee: Sabah Abid

Al-Zawraa	Erbil

GK	31	(Iraq) Ahmad Ali
DF	3	(Iraq) Ahmed Attiya	(yellow card) 36'
DF	15	(Iraq) Ghaith Abdul-Ghani (c)	(yellow card) 120+2'
DF	6	(Iraq) Ous Ibrahim
DF	29	(Iraq) Waleed Khalid
MF	16	(Iraq) Mohannad Nassir
MF	19	(Iraq) Salar Abdul-Jabbar		(substituted off) 95'
MF	26	(Iraq) Thamir Fuad		(substituted off) 115'
MF	7	(Iraq) Ali Yousef	(yellow card) 48'
MF	28	(Iraq) Sajjad Hussein		(substituted off) 46'
FW	10	(Iraq) Abdul-Salam Abboud	(yellow card) 97'
Substitutions:
FW	23	(Iraq) Mustafa Ahmad		(substituted on) 46'
MF	12	(Iraq) Hussein Saddam		(substituted on) 77'
FW	11	(Iraq) Alaa Sattar		(substituted on) 95'
MF	27	(Iraq) Naseem Jassim		(substituted on) 115'
Manager:
(Iraq) Radhi Shenaishil

GK	21	(Iraq) Sarhang Muhsin
DF	2	(Iraq) Samal Saeed	(yellow card) 109'
DF	3	(Iraq) Yassir Raad
DF	31	(Iraq) Salam Shakir
MF	55	(Iraq) Osama Ali	(yellow card) 32'	(substituted off) 53'
MF	24	(Iraq) Wissam Zaki	(yellow card) 26'
MF	14	(Iraq) Khaldoun Ibrahim
MF	23	(Iraq) Shirzad Mohammed		(substituted off) 33'
FW	10	(Iraq) Muslim Mubarak		(substituted off) 71'
FW	17	(Iraq) Ahmed Salah (c)
FW	11	(Iraq) Luay Salah		(substituted off) 108'
Substitutions:
MF	77	(Iraq) Alaa Nayrouz		(substituted on) 33'
DF	4	(Iraq) Rafid Badr Al-Deen		(substituted on) 53'
MF	18	(Iraq) Haidar Qaraman		(substituted on) 71'
MF	8	(Iraq) Haidar Sabah		(substituted on) 108'
Manager:
(Iraq) Thair Ahmed

Match officials

- Assistant referees:
  - Hussein Turki
  - Mohammed Arab
- Fourth official:
  - Kadhim Awda

Match rules

- 90 minutes.
- 30 minutes of extra-time if necessary.
- Penalty shootout if scores still level.

== Season statistics ==
=== Top six positions ===
Pos	Team	Pld	W	D	L	GF	GA	Qualification
1	Erbil	24	15	6	3	33	10	2009 AFC Cup
2	Al-Zawraa	30	15	8	7	36	18	2009 AFC Cup
3	Al-Quwa Al-Jawiya	34	20	5	9	58	26	2008–09 Arab Champions League
4	Duhok	24	14	6	4	28	13	
5	Al-Najaf	24	13	7	4	33	16	
6	Karbala	26	17	6	3	37	17	

=== Top scorers ===
Rank	Player	Club	Goals
1	(Iraq) Asaad Abdul-Nabi	Al-Kahrabaa	14
2	(Iraq) Taiseer Abdul-Hussein	Al-Shorta	12
2	(Iraq) Hussam Saeed	Al-Bareed / Al-Zawraa	12
4	(Iraq) Yassir Abdul-Mohsen	Al-Quwa Al-Jawiya	11
4	(Iraq) Abdul-Salam Abboud	Al-Zawraa	11

=== Hat-tricks ===
Player	For	Against	Result	Date
(Iraq) Akram Hashim	Al-Quwa Al-Jawiya	Al-Shuala	7–0	18 December 2007
(Iraq) Yassir Abdul-Mohsen	Al-Quwa Al-Jawiya	Al-Shuala	7–0	18 December 2007
(Iraq) Ali Mansoor^{4}	Al-Quwa Al-Jawiya	Kirkuk	6–3	17 July 2008
(Iraq) Younis Shakor	Kirkuk	Al-Quwa Al-Jawiya	3–6	17 July 2008

Notes

^{4} Player scored 4 goals
