= 2005–06 Iraqi Premier League =

Iraqi Premier League
- Season: 2005–06
- Champions: Al-Zawraa (11th title)
- Relegated: Al-Karkh; Ararat; Al-Samawa; Al-Kadhimiya; Zakho; Al-Kut; Al-Sulaikh; Al-Amana
- AFC Champions League: Al-Zawraa; Al-Najaf
- Arab Champions League: Erbil
- Top goalscorer: Sahib Abbas (17 goals)
- Biggest home win: Al-Talaba 6–0 Ararat (4 March 2006)
- Biggest away win: Al-Amana 0–5 Al-Najaf (9 December 2005); Al-Kut 0–5 Karbala (3 March 2006)
- Highest scoring: Karbala 4–2 Al-Kut (9 December 2005); Al-Talaba 6–0 Ararat (4 March 2006); Al-Talaba 4–2 Maysan (26 March 2006)

The 2005–06 Iraqi Premier League kicked off on October 28, 2005. The 28 teams were split into four groups of seven. At the end of the group stage, the top three teams from each group (a total of 12 teams) advanced to the Elite Stage. In the Elite Stage, these 12 teams were split into four groups of three, with teams playing home and away against each team in their group respectively. The top team in each of the four groups moved on to the semi-finals, followed by a third place match and the final. Al-Zawraa won the league without losing a match.

== Group stage ==
=== North Group ===
Pos	Team	Pld	W	D	L	GF	GA	GD	Pts	Qualification or relegation	TLB	DHK	ERB	SRW	KRK	ARR	ZKH
1	Al-Talaba	12	7	3	2	22	5	+17	24	Qualified to Elite Stage		2–0	2–0	1–2	3–0	6–0	4–0
2	Duhok	12	5	5	2	10	5	+5	20	Qualified to Elite Stage	1–0		0–0	3–0	0–1	3–1	0–0
3	Erbil	12	4	5	3	10	7	+3	17	Qualified to Elite Stage	0–0	0–1		4–1	1–0	1–1	2–0
4	Sirwan	12	4	5	3	11	13	−2	17		0–0	1–1	0–0		2–1	3–0	1–0
5	Kirkuk	12	4	1	7	10	15	−5	13		2–3	0–1	1–0	1–1		2–0	0–2
6	Ararat	12	2	5	5	6	18	−12	11	Relegated to the Iraqi First Division League	0–1	0–0	1–1	0–0	1–0		1–0
7	Zakho	12	2	4	6	6	12	−6	10	Relegated to the Iraqi First Division League	0–0	0–0	0–1	2–0	1–2	1–1	

Source: Goalzz

=== Central Group 1 ===
Pos	Team	Pld	W	D	L	GF	GA	GD	Pts	Qualification or relegation	ZWR	SMR	NJF	NFT	KHR	KDH	AMN
1	Al-Zawraa	12	9	3	0	29	9	+20	30	Qualified to Elite Stage		5–0	2–1	2–2	3–1	2–1	2–0
2	Samarra	12	5	4	3	12	15	−3	19	Qualified to Elite Stage	1–4		3–1	2–2	1–0	2–1	1–0
3	Al-Najaf	12	5	3	4	19	10	+9	18	Qualified to Elite Stage	1–1	1–0		4–1	0–1	4–0	1–0
4	Al-Naft	12	4	6	2	14	15	−1	18		1–4	0–0	1–0		1–1	2–0	1–1
5	Al-Kahrabaa	12	3	6	3	14	12	+2	15		1–2	1–1	1–1	1–1		0–0	2–0
6	Al-Kadhimiya	12	0	7	5	6	15	−9	7	Relegated to the Iraqi First Division League	0–0	0–0	0–0	0–1	2–2		2–2
7	Al-Amana	12	0	3	9	3	21	−18	3	Relegated to the Iraqi First Division League	0–2	0–1	0–5	0–1	0–3	0–0	

Source: Goalzz

=== Central Group 2 ===
Pos	Team	Pld	W	D	L	GF	GA	GD	Pts	Qualification or relegation	SHR	QWJ	JSH	SIN	DYL	KKH	SLK
1	Al-Shorta	12	9	3	0	21	4	+17	30	Qualified to Elite Stage		0–0	2–1	4–0	1–0	2–1	4–1
2	Al-Quwa Al-Jawiya	12	6	4	2	19	10	+9	22	Qualified to Elite Stage	1–1		2–2	1–1	1–0	5–2	4–1
3	Al-Jaish	12	5	3	4	12	10	+2	18	Qualified to Elite Stage	0–1	1–0		0–0	0–1	1–0	3–1
4	Al-Sinaa	12	3	5	4	7	10	−3	14		0–1	0–1	2–0		1–1	0–1	1–1
5	Diyala	12	3	4	5	5	9	−4	13		0–0	1–0	1–2	0–1		0–0	0–0
6	Al-Karkh	12	3	3	6	9	14	−5	12	Relegated to the Iraqi First Division League	0–3	0–1	0–2	0–0	3–0		0–0
7	Al-Sulaikh	12	0	4	8	5	21	−16	4	Relegated to the Iraqi First Division League	0–2	1–3	0–0	0–1	0–1	0–2	

Source: Goalzz

=== South Group ===
Pos	Team	Pld	W	D	L	GF	GA	GD	Pts	Qualification or relegation	MIN	KRB	MYS	NFJ	SHT	SMW	KUT
1	Al-Minaa	12	8	3	1	22	9	+13	27	Qualified to Elite Stage		4–3	2–0	3–1	3–0	1–0	3–0
2	Karbala	12	8	2	2	27	15	+12	26	Qualified to Elite Stage	2–0		2–1	1–0	1–0	1–1	4–2
3	Maysan	12	4	5	3	12	10	+2	17	Qualified to Elite Stage	0–0	3–1		2–0	0–0	0–0	2–1
4	Naft Al-Junoob	12	4	2	6	11	13	−2	14		1–3	1–1	2–1		0–1	1–0	3–0 (Note: The Naft Al-Junoob–Al-Kut match was awarded as a 3–0 win to Naft Al-Junoob after Al-Kut's players left the field during the match while Al-Kut were winning 2–0.)
5	Al-Shatra	12	3	5	4	9	15	−6	14		1–1	1–3	1–1	1–0		1–1	3–2
6	Al-Samawa	12	1	6	5	11	13	−2	9	Relegated to the Iraqi First Division League	1–2	2–3	1–1	0–0	3–0		2–2
7	Al-Kut	12	1	3	8	8	25	−17	6	Relegated to the Iraqi First Division League	0–0	0–5	0–1	0–2	0–0	1–0	

Source: Goalzz

== Elite stage ==
=== Group 1 ===
Pos	Team	Pld	W	D	L	GF	GA	GD	Pts	Qualification	ERB	SMR	MIN
1	Erbil	4	2	1	1	7	4	+3	7	Qualified to Semi-finals		1–0	3–0
2	Samarra	4	2	0	2	4	4	0	6		2–1		1–0
3	Al-Minaa	4	1	1	2	4	7	−3	4		2–2	2–1	

Source: Goalzz

=== Group 2 ===
Pos	Team	Pld	W	D	L	GF	GA	GD	Pts	Qualification	ZWR	DHK	JSH
1	Al-Zawraa	4	3	1	0	8	0	+8	10	Qualified to Semi-finals		3–0 (Note: The Al-Zawraa–Duhok match was awarded as a 3–0 win to Al-Zawraa, as Duhok turned up late to the game.)	2–0
2	Duhok	4	1	1	2	3	5	−2	4		0–0		2–0
3	Al-Jaish	4	1	0	3	2	8	−6	3		0–3	2–1	

Source: Goalzz

=== Group 3 ===
Pos	Team	Pld	W	D	L	GF	GA	GD	Pts	Qualification	NJF	KRB	SHR
1	Al-Najaf	4	2	1	1	5	2	+3	7	Qualified to Semi-finals		3–1	2–0
2	Karbala	4	2	0	2	5	8	−3	6		1–0		1–4
3	Al-Shorta	4	1	1	2	5	5	0	4		0–0	1–2	

Source: Goalzz

=== Group 4 ===
Pos	Team	Pld	W	D	L	GF	GA	GD	Pts	Qualification	QWJ	TLB	MYS
1	Al-Quwa Al-Jawiya	4	2	1	1	7	3	+4	7	Qualified to Semi-finals		0–1	3–0
2	Al-Talaba	4	2	1	1	7	6	+1	7		1–3		4–2
3	Maysan	4	0	2	2	4	9	−5	2		1–1	1–1	

Source: Goalzz

== Golden stage ==
Semi-finals
Al-Najaf	4	1	5
Erbil	1	1	2
Al-Quwa Al-Jawiya	1	0	1
Al-Zawraa	1	2	3

Final
Al-Zawraa (p)	0 (4)
Al-Najaf	0 (3)
Third place match
Erbil (w/o)	3
Al-Quwa Al-Jawiya	0

=== Semi-finals ===
21 May 2006
12:30 GMT

Al-Najaf	4–1	Erbil
Mohsen 3'; Abdul-Razzaq 12', 82'; Abbas 32'		Abdul-Wahid 90' (pen.)

Al-Najaf Stadium, Najaf
26 May 2006
12:30 GMT

Erbil	1–0 at 60'	Al-Najaf
Al-Deen 60' (pen.)

Match abandoned due to crowd trouble
Franso Hariri Stadium, Erbil
31 May 2006
12:30 GMT

Erbil	1–1	Al-Najaf
Younis 89'		Falih 80'

Replay behind closed doors
Franso Hariri Stadium, Erbil

Al-Najaf won 5–2 on aggregate

23 May 2006
12:30 GMT

Al-Quwa Al-Jawiya	1–1	Al-Zawraa
Mansoor 50'		Mohammed 3'

Al-Shaab Stadium, Baghdad
26 May 2006
12:30 GMT

Al-Zawraa	2–0	Al-Quwa Al-Jawiya
Abdul-Zahra 59'; Fawzi 82'

Al-Quwa Al-Jawiya players walked off the field at 90+3' due to crowd trouble
Al-Shaab Stadium, Baghdad

Al-Zawraa won 3–1 on aggregate

=== Third place match ===
Erbil	3–0 (w/o)	Al-Quwa Al-Jawiya

Match awarded as 3–0 win to Erbil as Al-Quwa Al-Jawiya were disqualified for the events that occurred during their semi-final second leg

=== Final ===
24 June 2006
13:30 GMT

Al-Zawraa	0–0 (a.e.t.)	Al-Najaf
Penalties
Fawzi (penalty scored); Kadhim (penalty scored); Abdul-Amir (penalty scored); Sabah (penalty missed); Mubarak (penalty scored)	4–3	(penalty missed) Sultan; (penalty scored) Mohsen; (penalty scored) Jawad; (penalty missed) Omran; (penalty scored) Jassim

Sulaymaniya Stadium, Sulaymaniya
Referee: Kadhim Awda

Al-Zawraa	Al-Najaf

GK	30	(Iraq) Sarmad Rasheed
DF	2	(Iraq) Haidar Mahmoud (c)
DF	3	(Iraq) Yassir Raad
DF	28	(Iraq) Khaldoun Ibrahim	(yellow card) 87'
DF	14	(Iraq) Haidar Abdul-Amir	(yellow card) 71'
MF	18	(Iraq) Haitham Kadhim
MF	16	(Iraq) Mohannad Nassir	(yellow card) 49'	(substituted off) 72'
MF	13	(Iraq) Haidar Sabah	(yellow card) 53'
MF	24	(Iraq) Wissam Zaki		(substituted off) 100'
FW	12	(Iraq) Alaa Abdul-Zahra		(substituted off) 67'
FW	8	(Iraq) Husham Mohammed
Substitutions:
FW	15	(Iraq) Hussam Fawzi		(substituted on) 67'
MF	5	(Iraq) Ahmed Abid Ali		(substituted on) 72'
FW	10	(Iraq) Muslim Mubarak		(substituted on) 100'
Manager:
(Iraq) Salih Radhi

GK	21	(Iraq) Jassim Mohammed Hamad
DF	3	(Iraq) Uday Omran
DF	4	(Iraq) Haidar Aboodi
DF	5	(Iraq) Nabeel Abbas
DF	7	(Iraq) Chasib Sultan
MF	25	(Iraq) Hatim Sahib		(substituted off) 78'
MF	18	(Iraq) Dhia Faleh	(yellow card) 43'
MF	6	(Iraq) Karrar Jassim	(yellow card) 69'
MF	22	(Iraq) Saeed Mohsen
FW	13	(Iraq) Falah Hassan (c)
FW	17	(Iraq) Yassir Abdul-Razzaq		(substituted off) 95'
Substitutions:
FW	29	(Iraq) Ali Mohammed		(substituted on) 78' (substituted off) 118'
DF	12	(Iraq) Qais Essa		(substituted on) 95'
DF	18	(Iraq) Zaman Jawad	(yellow card) 119'	(substituted on) 118'
Manager:
(Iraq) Abdul-Ghani Shahad

Match officials

- Assistant referees:
  - Sabhan Ahmed
  - Ali Zaidan

Match rules

- 90 minutes.
- 30 minutes of extra-time if necessary.
- Penalty shootout if scores still level.

== Season statistics ==
=== Top four positions ===
Pos	Team	Pld	W	D	L	GF	GA	Qualification
1	Al-Zawraa	19	13	6	0	40	10	2007 AFC Champions League
2	Al-Najaf	19	8	6	5	29	14	2007 AFC Champions League
3	Erbil	19	7	7	5	22	16	2006–07 Arab Champions League
4	Al-Quwa Al-Jawiya	19	8	6	5	27	19	

=== Top scorers ===
Pos	Scorer	Goals	Team
1	Sahib Abbas	17	Karbala
2	Mustafa Karim	14	Al-Shorta
3	Husham Mohammed	9	Al-Zawraa
4	Ahmed Ali Kareem	7	Al-Samawa
4	Alaa Kalaf	7	Al-Talaba
4	Yassir Abdul-Razzaq	7	Al-Najaf
4	Alaa Kadhim	7	Al-Talaba
4	Nawaf Falah	7	Al-Minaa
4	Qusay Abdul-Wahid	7	Erbil

=== Hat-tricks ===
Player	For	Against	Result	Date
(Iraq) Ahmed Salah	Al-Talaba	Kirkuk	3–0	1 November 2005
(Iraq) Alaa Kadhim	Al-Talaba	Zakho	4–0	15 November 2005
(Iraq) Sahib Abbas	Karbala	Al-Kut	4–2	9 December 2005
(Iraq) Sahib Abbas	Karbala	Al-Kut	5–0	3 March 2006
(Iraq) Alaa Kalaf	Al-Talaba	Ararat	6–0	4 March 2006
(Iraq) Karrar Jassim	Al-Najaf	Karbala	3–1	21 April 2006
