= 2006–07 Iraqi Premier League =

Iraqi Premier League
- Season: 2006–07
- Champions: Erbil (1st title)
- Relegated: Diyala
- AFC Champions League: Erbil; Al-Quwa Al-Jawiya
- Arab Champions League: Al-Najaf; Al-Talaba
- Top goalscorer: Ahmed Salah (11 goals)
- Highest scoring: Al-Sinaa 2–4 Al-Quwa Al-Jawiya (18 March 2007); Al-Najaf 5–1 Al-Shatra (19 May 2007); Duhok 2–4 Al-Zawraa (26 June 2007)

The 2006–07 Iraqi Premier League kicked off on December 22, 2006 and finished on July 6, 2007. Erbil were crowned champions for the first time in their history, defeating Al-Quwa Al-Jawiya 1–0 in the final, hosted at the Franso Hariri Stadium, Erbil's home ground.

== Group stage ==
=== North Group ===
Pos	Team	Pld	W	D	L	GF	GA	GD	Pts	Qualification	ERB	DHK	SRW	SLY	MSL	SMR	KRK
1	Erbil	12	8	3	1	21	8	+13	27	Qualified to Elite Stage		4–0	1–0	0–0	1–0	4–0	2–1
2	Duhok	12	6	4	2	12	11	+1	22	Qualified to Elite Stage	2–1		1–1	2–1	0–0	2–1	1–0
3	Sirwan	12	5	5	2	12	9	+3	20	Qualified to Elite Stage	1–1	2–1		1–2	2–1	0–0	1–0
4	Sulaymaniya	12	5	4	3	14	12	+2	19		1–2	0–1	1–1		2–1	3–2	1–0
5	Al-Mosul	12	1	5	6	7	12	−5	8		1–2	0–0	0–1	1–1		0–0	1–1
6	Samarra	12	1	5	6	10	17	−7	8		1–1	1–1	0–1	1–1	1–2		1–2
7	Kirkuk	12	2	2	8	7	14	−7	8		1–2	0–1	1–1	0–1	1–0	0–2	

Source: Goalzz

=== Central Group 1 ===
Pos	Team	Pld	W	D	L	GF	GA	GD	Pts	Qualification	SHR	QWJ	SIN	JSH
1	Al-Shorta	6	6	0	0	12	1	+11	18	Qualified to Elite Stage		2–1	1–0	3–0
2	Al-Quwa Al-Jawiya	6	3	1	2	12	6	+6	10	Qualified to Elite Stage	0–1		0–0	4–1
3	Al-Sinaa	6	1	2	3	3	7	−4	5	Qualified to Elite Stage	0–2	2–4		0–0
4	Al-Jaish	6	0	1	5	1	14	−13	1		0–3	0–3	0–1	

Source: Goalzz

Note: Diyala withdrew from the league and were relegated. Lower division side Al-Ramadi were chosen to replace them but they also withdrew.

=== Central Group 2 ===
Pos	Team	Pld	W	D	L	GF	GA	GD	Pts	Qualification	ZWR	TLB	NFT	KHR	ADL
1	Al-Zawraa	8	3	5	0	9	3	+6	14	Qualified to Elite Stage		0–0	1–1	2–0	2–0
2	Al-Talaba	8	3	4	1	7	5	+2	13	Qualified to Elite Stage	0–0		2–1	0–2	0–0
3	Al-Naft	8	2	3	3	9	8	+1	9	Qualified to Elite Stage	1–1	1–2		3–1	0–1
4	Al-Kahrabaa	8	2	3	3	6	9	−3	9		1–1	1–3	0–0		0–0
5	Al-Adala	8	1	3	4	1	7	−6	6		0–2	0–0	0–2	0–1	

Source: Goalzz

=== South Group ===
Pos	Team	Pld	W	D	L	GF	GA	GD	Pts	Qualification	NJF	MIN	KRB	NFJ	MYS	SHT	FRT
1	Al-Najaf	12	10	1	1	24	9	+15	31	Qualified to Elite Stage		1–0	2–1	2–1	3–0	5–1	4–0
2	Al-Minaa	12	8	3	1	19	6	+13	27	Qualified to Elite Stage	3–0 (Note: The Al-Minaa–Al-Najaf match was awarded as a 3–0 win to Al-Minaa, as Al-Najaf did not turn up for the game.)		1–1	2–1	2–0	2–1	4–0
3	Karbala	12	5	6	1	18	8	+10	21	Qualified to Elite Stage	0–0	1–1		1–1	2–2	2–0	3–0
4	Naft Al-Junoob	12	3	4	5	12	12	0	13		0–1	0–1	1–1		2–1	0–0	1–0
5	Maysan	12	2	3	7	10	20	−10	9		1–2	0–1	0–1	1–1		1–0	1–1
6	Al-Shatra	12	2	2	8	10	19	−9	8		1–2	1–1	0–1	0–3 (Note: The Al-Shatra–Naft Al-Junoob match was awarded as a 3–0 win to Naft Al-Junoob after the game had originally ended in a 1–0 win for Al-Shatra.)	4–0		1–0
7	Al-Furat	12	2	1	9	7	26	−19	7		1–2	0–1	0–4	2–1	1–3	2–1	

Source: Goalzz

== Elite stage ==
=== Group 1 ===
Pos	Team	Pld	W	D	L	GF	GA	GD	Pts	Qualification	ERB	TLB	KRB	MIN	NFT	SHR
1	Erbil	5	4	0	1	10	3	+7	12	Qualified to Semi-finals		0–1	2–1	2–1	2–0	4–0
2	Al-Talaba	5	2	2	1	3	2	+1	8	Qualified to Semi-finals			1–1		0–0	
3	Karbala	5	2	1	2	7	7	0	7						0–2	2–1
4	Al-Minaa	5	2	1	2	4	5	−1	7			1–0	1–3			
5	Al-Naft	5	1	1	3	2	4	−2	4					0–1		0–1
6	Al-Shorta	5	1	1	3	2	7	−5	4			0–1		0–0		

Source: Goalzz

=== Group 2 ===
Pos	Team	Pld	W	D	L	GF	GA	GD	Pts	Qualification	QWJ	NJF	SIN	ZWR	DHK	SRW
1	Al-Quwa Al-Jawiya	5	4	1	0	8	4	+4	13	Qualified to Semi-finals		2–2				1–0
2	Al-Najaf	5	2	3	0	11	5	+6	9	Qualified to Semi-finals				2–1		5–0
3	Al-Sinaa	5	2	2	1	5	4	+1	8		0–1	1–1				
4	Al-Zawraa	5	1	2	2	8	8	0	5		0–1		1–1			
5	Duhok	5	0	2	3	6	10	−4	2		2–3	1–1	1–2	2–4		0–0
6	Sirwan	5	0	2	3	2	9	−7	2				0–1	2–2		

Source: Goalzz

== Golden stage ==
Semi-finals
4 July 2007
Al-Quwa Al-Jawiya	2
Al-Talaba	0
4 July 2007
Erbil	2
Al-Najaf	0

Final
6 July 2007
Al-Quwa Al-Jawiya	0
Erbil	1
Third place
6 July 2007
Al-Talaba	1
Al-Najaf	2

=== Semi-finals ===
4 July 2007
14:30 GMT

Al-Quwa Al-Jawiya	2–0	Al-Talaba
Mansoor 38'; Rahim 54'

Franso Hariri Stadium, Erbil
4 July 2007
17:30 GMT

Erbil	2–0	Al-Najaf
Munir 15'; Salah 22'

Franso Hariri Stadium, Erbil

=== Third place match ===
6 July 2007
14:30 GMT

Al-Talaba	1–2	Al-Najaf
Abdul-Mohsen 52'		Abdul-Razzaq 7'; Mohammed 18'

Franso Hariri Stadium, Erbil

=== Final ===
6 July 2007
17:00 GMT

Al-Quwa Al-Jawiya	0–1	Erbil
		Salah 1'

Franso Hariri Stadium, Erbil
Referee: Kadhim Awda

Al-Quwa Al-Jawiya	Erbil

GK	1	(Iraq) Wissam Gassid
DF	4	(Iraq) Muayad Khalid	(yellow card) 86'
DF	24	(Iraq) Fareed Majeed
DF	6	(Iraq) Haidar Rahim
DF	23	(Iraq) Azhar Tahir
MF	20	(Iraq) Hussein Abdul-Wahed
MF	18	(Iraq) Mohanad Yousif		(substituted off) 54'
MF	19	(Iraq) Ahmad Ayad	(yellow card) 15' (red card) 90+3'
MF	28	(Iraq) Ibrahim Kamil		(substituted off) 79'
FW	10	(Iraq) Ali Khudhair		(substituted off) 65'
FW	11	(Iraq) Ali Mansoor (c)	(yellow card) 45+2' (red card) 90+4'
Substitutions:
MF	8	(Iraq) Hussein Saddam	(yellow card) 74' (red card) 90+5'	(substituted on) 54'
FW	16	(Iraq) Qusay Abdul-Wahid		(substituted on) 65'
FW	29	(Iraq) Amjad Radhi		(substituted on) 79'
Manager:
(Iraq) Radhi Shenaishil

GK	21	(Iraq) Sarhang Muhsin
DF	3	(Iraq) Yassir Raad
DF	4	(Iraq) Rafid Badr Al-Deen (c)
DF	5	(Iraq) Salah Al-Deen Siamand
MF	7	(Iraq) Muwafaq Younis
MF	18	(Iraq) Haidar Qaraman		(substituted off) 27'
MF	24	(Iraq) Wissam Zaki
MF	90	(Iraq) Arkan Najib	(red card) 90+3'
MF	91	(Iraq) Alaa Nayrouz	(yellow card) 76'
FW	9	(Iraq) Mustafa Karim	(yellow card) 90+2'	(substituted off) 90+2'
FW	17	(Iraq) Ahmed Salah		(substituted off) 83'
Substitutions:
MF	23	(Iraq) Shirzad Mohammed		(substituted on) 27'
FW	10	(Iraq) Kayfi Abdul-Rahman		(substituted on) 83'
DF	6	(Iraq) Mohammed Hamakhan		(substituted on) 90+2'
Manager:
(Iraq) Akram Salman

Match officials

- Assistant referees:
  - Sabhan Ahmed
  - Ahmed Abdul-Hussein
- Fourth official:
  - Sabah Qasim

Match rules

- 90 minutes.
- 30 minutes of extra-time if necessary.
- Penalty shootout if scores still level.

== Season statistics ==
=== Top four positions ===
Pos	Team	Pld	W	D	L	GF	GA	Qualification
1	Erbil	19	14	3	2	34	11	2008 AFC Champions League
2	Al-Quwa Al-Jawiya	13	8	2	3	22	11	2008 AFC Champions League
3	Al-Najaf	19	13	4	2	37	17	2007–08 Arab Champions League
4	Al-Talaba	15	5	6	4	11	11	2007–08 Arab Champions League

=== Top scorers ===
Pos	Scorer	Goals	Team
1	Ahmed Salah	11	Erbil
2	Sahib Abbas	9	Karbala
3	Halgurd Mulla Mohammed	8	Sulaymaniya
4	Mustafa Karim	7	Erbil
5	Khalid Mushir	6	Duhok
5	Hussam Ibrahim	6	Al-Minaa
5	Saeed Mohsen	6	Al-Najaf
