= 2008–09 Iraqi Premier League =

Iraqi Premier League
- Season: 2008–09
- Champions: Erbil (3rd title)
- Top goalscorer: Ahmed Salah (15 goals)
- Biggest home win: Al-Najaf 6–1 Maysan (22 May 2009)
- Biggest away win: Al-Kahrabaa 0–6 Erbil (5 June 2009)
- Highest scoring: Al-Najaf 6–1 Maysan (22 May 2009)

The 2008–09 Iraqi Premier League was the 35th edition of the competition. It started on 1 November 2008 and ended on 16 July 2009. 27 teams from all over the country competed for the title. Erbil won the title by defeating Al-Najaf in the final via penalty shootout after a goalless draw. It was Erbil's third league title in a row. The two teams would have qualified for the 2010 AFC Cup, but were disqualified due to FIFA's suspension of the Iraq Football Association.

The 2008–09 season is the only season in history where none of the four Baghdad Derby clubs (Al-Quwa Al-Jawiya, Al-Shorta, Al-Talaba and Al-Zawraa) finished in the top four.

== Name changes ==
- Al-Bareed renamed to Al-Etisalat wal-Bareed at the end of 2008.

== Group stage ==
=== Group 1 ===
Pos	Team	Pld	W	D	L	GF	GA	GD	Pts	Qualification
1	Erbil	26	20	4	2	55	17	+38	64	Qualified to the Final
2	Duhok	26	18	7	1	47	11	+36	61	Qualified to Third place match
3	Al-Quwa Al-Jawiya	26	12	6	8	36	25	+11	42	
4	Al-Naft	26	11	6	9	23	26	−3	39	
5	Pires	26	9	10	7	27	26	+1	37	
6	Al-Ramadi	26	10	7	9	29	30	−1	37	
7	Samarra	26	9	7	10	27	23	+4	34	
8	Al-Shorta	26	8	10	8	29	29	0	34	
9	Salahaddin	26	8	9	9	24	27	−3	33	
10	Al-Kahrabaa	26	7	9	10	22	34	−12	30	
11	Kirkuk	26	6	9	11	18	25	−7	27	
12	Sulaymaniya	26	6	9	11	26	34	−8	27	
13	Al-Hudood	26	4	7	15	15	33	−18	19	
14	Diyala	26	1	6	19	9	47	−38	9	

Source: Goalzz
Rules for classification: 1) points; 2) goal difference; 3) number of goals scored.

==== Results ====
Home \ Away	HUD	KAH	NFT	QWJ	RAM	SHR	ERB	DYL	DUH	KRK	PIR	SAL	SMR	SUL
Al-Hudood		0–1	0–3	2–3	0–0	1–1	0–2	3–0	0–4	3–0	1–1	1–0	0–0	0–0
Al-Kahrabaa	1–0		0–1	0–0	1–3	0–0	0–6	1–1	1–1	1–0	0–0	1–1	1–1	2–1
Al-Naft	1–0	1–0		1–3	1–0	2–2	0–0	1–0	0–1	0–0	1–0	2–0	1–1	1–0
Al-Quwa Al-Jawiya	2–0	2–1	2–2		1–1	4–1	0–2	4–0	0–0	0–1	3–1	0–0	2–1	1–1
Al-Ramadi	2–0	1–2	1–1	1–0		2–0	2–2	2–1	1–2	2–1	0–0	0–0	0–1	1–1
Al-Shorta	0–0	2–0	1–0	1–2	2–0		1–2	3–0	1–0	0–0	1–1	2–3	1–0	2–1
Erbil	3–0	3–1	3–0	1–0	3–1	1–0		2–0	1–2	3–1	2–0	3–1	1–0	4–2
Diyala	0–1	0–1	0–1	1–2	1–3	0–3 (Note: The Diyala–Al-Shorta match was awarded as a 3–0 win to Al-Shorta after Diyala's players left the field during the first half while losing 1–0.)	0–2		0–2	1–1	0–3	0–0	1–0	1–1
Duhok	2–1	3–2	3–0	2–1	4–0	4–0	3–0 (Note: The Duhok–Erbil match was ended early with the score at 3–0 to Duhok.)	4–0		1–0	0–0	1–0	2–0	1–1
Kirkuk	1–0	0–0	1–0	0–1	1–2	2–2	2–2	1–0	0–1		2–0	2–3	0–1	1–0
Pires	1–1	2–1	1–0	1–0	2–0	1–1	0–3 (Note: The Pires–Erbil match was awarded as a 3–0 win to Erbil after the game was abandoned with the score at 1–1.)	4–1	2–2	0–0		2–1	2–0	2–1
Salahaddin	1–0	2–2	2–1	1–0	0–1	0–0	0–0	1–1	0–2	1–0	3–0		0–0	1–3
Samarra	2–0	1–2	4–0	2–1	1–2	3–2	1–2	1–0	0–0	0–0	1–1	1–2		2–0
Sulaymaniya	2–1	3–1	1–2	1–2	2–1	0–0	0–2	0–0	0–0	1–1	1–0	2–1	1–4	

Source: Goalzz
Legend: Blue = home team win; Yellow = draw; Red = away team win.

=== Group 2 ===
Pos	Team	Pld	W	D	L	GF	GA	GD	Pts	Qualification
1	Al-Najaf	24	15	7	2	39	12	+27	52	Qualified to the Final
2	Al-Amana	24	13	11	0	37	15	+22	50	Qualified to Third place match
3	Al-Talaba	24	14	5	5	32	15	+17	47	
4	Al-Zawraa	24	9	9	6	30	24	+6	36	
5	Naft Al-Junoob	24	9	9	6	27	23	+4	36	
6	Al-Minaa	24	10	6	8	20	24	−4	36	
7	Al-Kufa	24	7	11	6	24	24	0	32	
8	Al-Sinaa	24	4	15	5	17	18	−1	27	
9	Al-Nasiriya	24	6	7	11	23	28	−5	25	
10	Al-Samawa	24	5	9	10	15	25	−10	24	
11	Karbala	24	5	5	14	18	30	−12	20	
12	Al-Etisalat wal-Bareed	24	3	6	15	11	30	−19	15	
13	Maysan	24	2	8	14	20	45	−25	14	

Source: Goalzz
Rules for classification: 1) points; 2) goal difference; 3) number of goals scored.

Note: Al-Mosul withdrew from the league.

==== Results ====
Home \ Away	AMN	BRD	KUF	MIN	NJF	NAS	SMA	SIN	TLB	ZWR	KRB	MAY	NFJ
Al-Amana		1–1	4–1	3–0	1–1	1–1	2–0	1–1	0–0	1–1	3–0	3–2	2–2
Al-Etisalat wal-Bareed	0–1		0–1	2–0	0–0	1–0	2–2	0–1	0–1	1–4	0–2	1–1	1–0
Al-Kufa	2–2	1–0		1–1	0–1	3–1	1–0	0–0	0–1	0–0	1–1	3–1	1–1
Al-Minaa	1–1	1–0	2–2		0–1	1–0	2–0	2–1	1–0	1–0	1–0	2–1	0–0
Al-Najaf	1–1	3–0	1–0	1–0		1–1	3–0	3–1	1–0	1–2	2–0	6–1	2–1
Al-Nasiriya	0–1	3–0 (Note: The Al-Nasiriya–Al-Etisalat wal-Bareed match was awarded as a 3–0 win to Al-Nasiriya after Al-Etisalat wal-Bareed's players left the field while losing 2–0.)	0–0	0–1	1–2		1–2	1–1	1–2	1–2	1–0	2–1	2–0
Al-Samawa	0–1	1–0	0–2	3–0	0–0	1–1		0–0	0–0	1–1	2–1	2–0	0–0
Al-Sinaa	0–1	1–0	1–1	0–0	0–0	0–0	0–0		0–0	0–0	1–0	1–1	0–0
Al-Talaba	0–1	1–0	3–0	2–1	2–0	3–0	1–1	1–1		0–2	2–0	4–1	3–2
Al-Zawraa	0–2	3–1	2–2	4–1	0–2	2–1	1–0	1–1	0–1		0–0	1–1	1–3
Karbala	1–2	1–1	0–0	0–1	0–3	1–1	4–0	2–1	1–2	0–1		2–1	1–0
Maysan	0–2	0–0	0–1	1–1	0–3	1–2	1–0	2–4	0–2	1–1	1–0		0–0
Naft Al-Junoob	0–0	1–0	2–1	1–0	1–1	1–2	1–0	2–1	2–1	2–1	3–1	2–2	

Source: Goalzz
Legend: Blue = home team win; Yellow = draw; Red = away team win.

== Championship play-off ==
Team 1	Score	Team 2
Third place match
Al-Amana	0–1	Duhok
Final
Al-Najaf	0–0 (a.e.t.) (2–3 p.)	Erbil

=== Third place match ===
15 July 2009
15:30 GMT

Al-Amana	0–1	Duhok
Abdul-Nabi (penalty missed) 15'		Mushir 48'

Al-Shaab Stadium, Baghdad
Referee: Kadhim Awda

=== Final ===
16 July 2009
15:30 GMT

Al-Najaf	0–0 (a.e.t.)	Erbil
Penalties
Mohsen (penalty scored); Sahib (penalty scored); Naeem (penalty missed); Faleh (penalty missed); Sadir (penalty missed); Sultan (penalty missed)	2–3	(penalty scored) Mubarak; (penalty missed) Abdul-Wahed; (penalty missed) Mohammed; (penalty missed) Mansoor; (penalty scored) Al-Deen; (penalty scored) Raad

Al-Shaab Stadium, Baghdad
Referee: Alaa Abdul-Qadir

Al-Najaf	Erbil

GK	20	(Iraq) Alaa Gatea
DF	7	(Iraq) Chasib Sultan (c)
DF	3	(Iraq) Uday Omran		(substituted off) 56'
DF	5	(Iraq) Nabeel Abbas
DF	24	(Iraq) Faisal Jassim
MF	22	(Iraq) Saeed Mohsen
MF	18	(Iraq) Dhia Faleh
MF	15	(Iraq) Dhia Abbas		(substituted off) 61'
MF	9	(Iraq) Sahel Naeem
FW	10	(Iraq) Hussein Karim		(substituted off) 97'
FW	12	(Iraq) Alaa Aasi	(yellow card) 98'
Substitutions:
DF	6	(Iraq) Ayad Sadir	(yellow card) 119'	(substituted on) 56'
MF		(Iraq) Faris Saadoun	(yellow card) 62'	(substituted on) 61'
MF	25	(Iraq) Hatim Sahib		(substituted on) 97'
Manager:
(Iraq) Hatif Shamran

GK	1	(Iraq) Ahmad Ali
DF	2	(Iraq) Samal Saeed	(yellow card) 109'
DF	3	(Iraq) Yassir Raad
DF	16	(Iraq) Saad Attiya
DF	14	(Iraq) Khaldoun Ibrahim	(yellow card) 77'	(substituted off) 96'
MF	19	(Iraq) Deyar Rahman
MF	12	(Iraq) Herdi Noor Al-Deen		(substituted off) 67'
MF	25	(Iraq) Ahmed Abid Ali
FW	17	(Iraq) Ahmed Salah (c)		(substituted off) 61'
FW	11	(Iraq) Luay Salah	(yellow card) 32'	(substituted off) 83'
FW	10	(Iraq) Muslim Mubarak
Substitutions:
FW	9	(Iraq) Ali Mansoor	(yellow card) 99'	(substituted on) 61'
MF	23	(Iraq) Shirzad Mohammed		(substituted on) 67'
MF	20	(Iraq) Hussein Abdul-Wahed		(substituted on) 83'
DF	4	(Iraq) Rafid Badr Al-Deen		(substituted on) 96'
Manager:
(Iraq) Thair Ahmed

Match officials

- Assistant referees:
  - Ali Zaidan
  - Luay Subhi

Match rules

- 90 minutes.
- 30 minutes of extra-time if necessary.
- Penalty shootout if scores still level.

== Season statistics ==
=== Top four positions ===
Pos	Team	Pld	W	D	L	GF	GA	Qualification
1	Erbil	27	20	5	2	55	17	2010 AFC Cup (disqualified)
2	Al-Najaf	25	15	8	2	39	12	2010 AFC Cup (disqualified)
3	Duhok	27	19	7	1	48	11	
4	Al-Amana	25	13	11	1	37	16	

=== Top scorers ===
Rank	Player	Club	Goals
1	(Iraq) Ahmed Salah	Erbil	15
2	(Iraq) Luay Salah	Erbil	11
3	(Iraq) Nasser Tallaa	Naft Al-Junoob	9
3	(Iraq) Sahib Abbas	Karbala	9
3	(Iraq) Hussein Karim	Al-Najaf	9

=== Hat-tricks ===
Player	For	Against	Result	Date
(Iraq) Ahmed Jadiea	Al-Amana	Karbala	3–0	14 November 2008
(Iraq) Sahib Abbas	Karbala	Al-Samawa	4–0	12 December 2008
(Iraq) Ahmed Hanoon	Al-Quwa Al-Jawiya	Al-Naft	3–1	20 March 2009
(Iraq) Zaid Abdul-Hamza	Al-Kufa	Al-Nasiriya	3–1	9 May 2009
(Iraq) Ahmed Salah	Erbil	Al-Kahrabaa	6–0	5 June 2009
