= Sarhang Muhsin =

Kurdish Iraqi footballer (born 1986)

Sarhang Muhsin Nadr
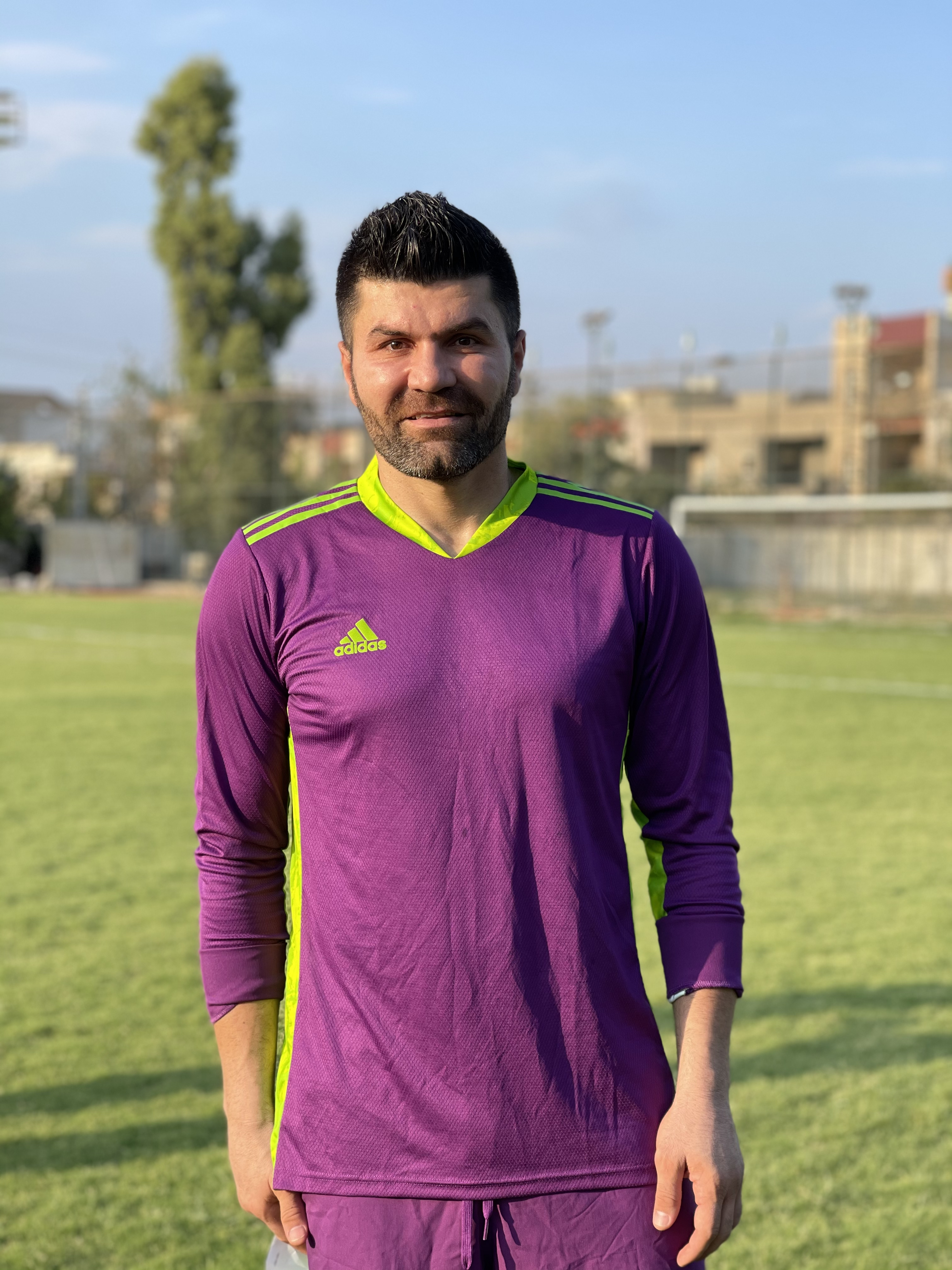

Personal information
- Date of birth: 1 December 1986 (age 39)
- Place of birth: Erbil, Iraq
- Height: 1.86 m (6 ft 1 in)
- Position: Goalkeeper

Team information
- Current team: Erbil SC
- Number: 21

Senior career*
Years	Team	Apps	(Gls)
2001–2019	Erbil	386	(0)
2017	→Al-Shorta (loan)		
2020-2023	Amanat Baghdad		
2023-2025	Al-Najaf SC	10	(0)
2025-	Erbil	2	(0)

International career^{‡}
2006	Iraq	5	(0)
2006–	Kurdistan	22	(0)
- * Club domestic league appearances and goals as of 18 December 2024 @ 15:46(AEST) ‡ National team caps and goals as of 18 May 2007

Sarhang Muhsin Nader (Arabic: سَرهَنك مُحسِن نَادِر; Kurdish: سەرهەنگ موحسین نادر; born 1 December 1986) is an Iraqi professional footballer who plays as a goalkeeper for Iraq Stars League club Al-Najaf.

== Honours ==
Club

- Iraqi Premier League: 2006–07, 2007–08, 2008–09 and 2011–12; runner-up: 2010–11, 2012–13
