= Salam Shaker =

Iraqi footballer

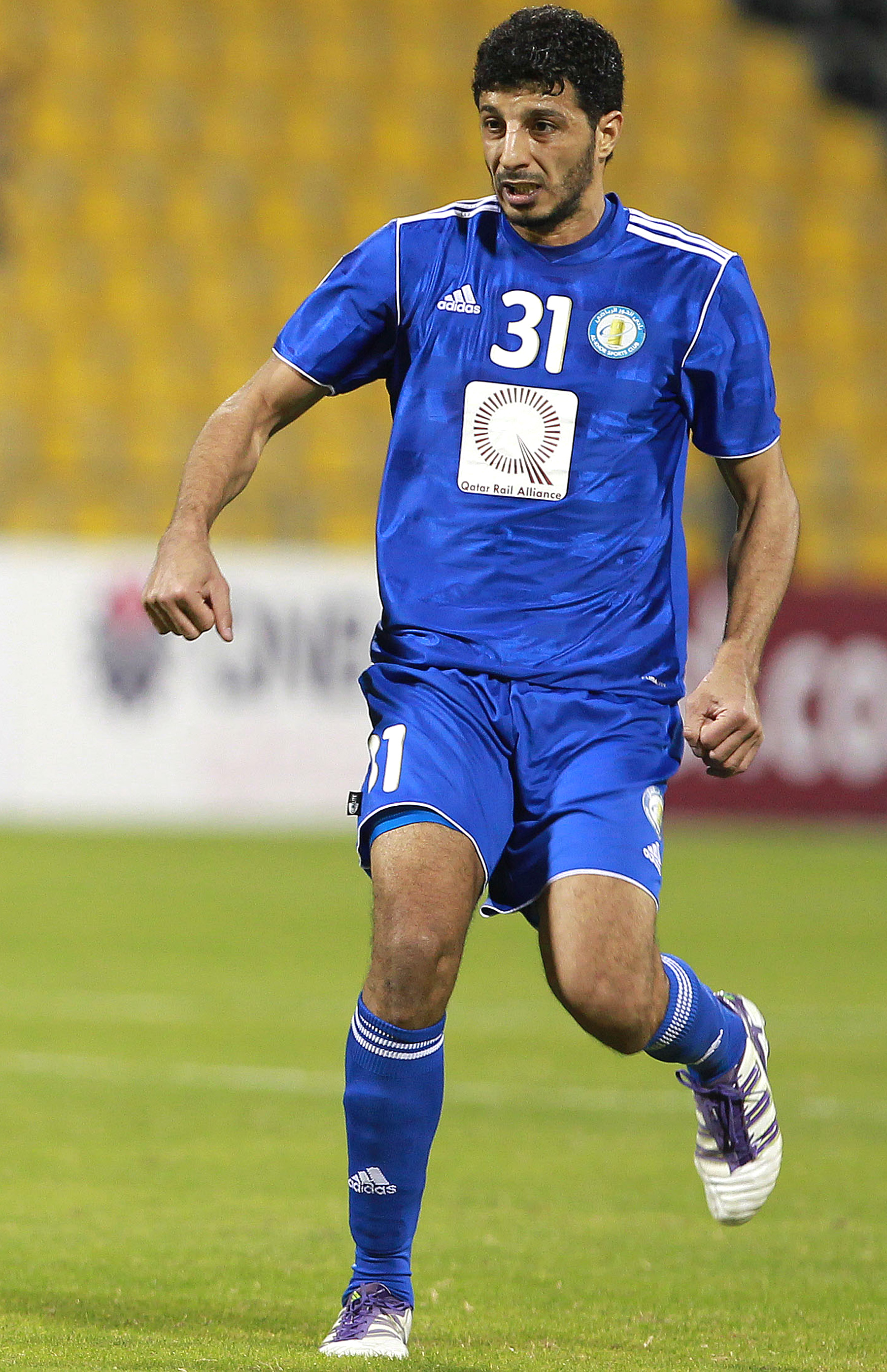

Personal information
- Full name: Salam Shaker Alidad
- Date of birth: 31 July 1986 (age 40)
- Place of birth: Baghdad, Iraqi Republic
- Height: 1.91 m (6 ft 3 in)
- Position: Centre-back

Team information
- Current team: Iraq U17 (coach)

Youth career
- 2003–2004: Al-Karkh

Senior career*
Years	Team	Apps	(Gls)
2004	Al-Karkh		(3)
2004–2005	Al-Shorta		
2005–2006	Al-Talaba	19	(0)
2006–2008	Erbil SC	34	(2)
2008–2014	Al-Khor	143	(8)
2014–2015	Al-Shorta		(1)
2015–2016	Al-Fateh	23	(1)
2016–2017	Ittihad Kalba	25	(2)
2017	Al-Shorta	0	(0)
2017–2018	Al-Zawraa		
2018–2019	Al-Talaba		

International career
2008–2016	Iraq	95	(4)

Managerial career
- 2020: Al-Talaba (assistant)
- 2026–: Iraq U17
- * Club domestic league appearances and goals as of 13 May 2017

Salam Shaker Alidad (Arabic: سَلَام شَاكِر عَلِيّ دَاد , born 31 July 1986) is a football coach and former Iraqi professional footballer who played as a centre-back. He was part of the Iraqi team that finished fourth at the 2015 AFC Asian Cup. He currently coaches Iraq U17

== Personal life ==
Salam is of Kurdish descent from the Feyli tribe.

He is the son of Iraqi international defender Shaker Alidad, who played for Al-Talaba in the 1970s and 80s.

== Club career ==
=== Al Karkh ===
Salam started his career at Baghdad based club Al-Karkh SC before transferring to Al Shorta SC in 2004

=== Al Shorta ===
Shakir started all six of Al-Shorta's 2005 AFC Champions League matches, being subbed off in only one of them. He was signed by Iraqi Premier League club Al-Talaba in 2005.

=== Al Talaba ===
Salam signed for Al Talaba in 2005 for one season, playing 19 times and scoring one goal.

=== Erbil ===
Salam moved to Erbil in 2006. He remained there for two seasons where he won 2 league titles.

=== Al Khor ===
In 2008 Salam joined Qatari Club Al Khor. He remained there for over 7 years and played more than a century of matches. He captained the side for a number of seasons and is considered one of their greatest ever players.

=== Second stint at Al Shorta ===
Salam returned briefly to Al Shorta in 2015 and remained for one season where Al Shorta finished 3rd in the league.

=== Al Fateh ===
Salam signed for Saudi club Al-Fateh FC in 2015. He made his debut against Khaleej FC on 20 August of that year. He scored his first goal for the club in a 1–0 victory over Al-Taawoun FC in April 2016. Al Fateh narrowly avoided relegation in his first season for the club. Salam and Al Fateh mutually agreed to terminate the contract, citing player's personal reasons to do so.

=== Al-Ittihad Kalba ===
On 4 July 2016, it was announced that Al-Ittihad Kalba SC would sign Salam Shaker on a free transfer. Salam was named captain of the team for the 2016/17 AGL Season. He scored his first goal for the club on 15 April 2017.

== International career ==
Shakir represented the former Iraqi Olympic side that won the silver medal at the 2006 Asian Games at Doha, and he was called into the national B team for the 2007 King's Cup in Thailand. His debut with the senior team came in January 2008, when he played a defensive role in Iraq's 1–1 friendly draw with Jordan.

Shakir made two appearances in Iraq's qualifying campaign for the 2010 FIFA World Cup in South Africa. He played the entirety of the 1–1 draw against China before starting again in the 1–0 loss to Qatar.

Shakir later became a frequent starter for Iraq. He would be first choice center back with Ali Rhema. Shaker played in all the 2014 World Cup qualification matches.

Salam Shaker was the starting center back for Iraq in the 2015 Asian cup as the team finished fourth. He scored the deciding penalty Vs Iran in the Quarter final of the competition.

On 29 March 2016, hours after captaining Iraq to a 1–0 win over Vietnam in the joint AFC and World cup qualification, Salam Shaker announced his retirement from international football, citing his reason to allow younger players the opportunity to represent the Iraqi national team.

== Career statistics ==
=== International ===
Appearances and goals by national team and year
National team	Year	Apps	Goals
Iraq	2008	6	0
Iraq	2009	12	0
Iraq	2010	8	1
Iraq	2011	17	1
Iraq	2012	12	1
Iraq	2013	16	1
Iraq	2014	7	0
Iraq	2015	14	0
Iraq	2016	3	0
Total		95	4

Scores and results list Iraq's goal tally first, score column indicates score after each Shaker goal.

List of international goals scored by Salam Shaker
No.	Date	Venue	Opponent	Score	Result	Competition
1	27 December 2010	Abbasiyyin Stadium, Damascus, Syria	Syria	1–0	1–0	Friendly
2	19 August 2011	Khalifa International Stadium, Doha, Qatar	Qatar	1–0	1–0	Friendly
3	30 June 2012	Prince Abdullah al-Faisal Stadium, Jeddah, Saudi Arabia	Sudan	1–0	1–1	2012 Arab Nations Cup
4	6 January 2013	Khalifa Sports City Stadium, Isa Town, Bahrain	Saudi Arabia	1–0	2–0	21st Arabian Gulf Cup

== Honours ==
=== Club ===
Erbil

- Iraqi Premier League: 2006–07, 2007–08

Al-Zawraa

- Iraqi Premier League: 2017–18
