= Hussein Abdul-Wahid Waham =

Iraqi footballer

Hussein Abdul-Wahid
Personal information
- Full name: Hussein Abdul-Wahid Waham Al-Fayyadh
- Date of birth: 28 February 1985 (age 41)
- Place of birth: Baghdad, Iraq
- Position: Defensive midfielder

Team information
- Current team: Al-Shorta (Assist. coach)

Youth career
- Al-Sinaa

Senior career*
Years	Team	Apps	(Gls)
1999–2000	Al-Shabab		
2000–2005	Zakho		
2005–2007	Al-Zawraa		
2007	Al-Quwa Al-Jawiya		
2008	Duhok		
2008–2012	Erbil		(1)
2012–2015	Al-Shorta		
2015–2016	Al-Zawraa		(1)
2016–2019	Al-Shorta		

International career^{‡}
2009–2016	Iraq	7	(0)

Managerial career
- 2019–2020: Al-Shorta (Assist. coach)
- 2020–2021: Al-Shorta (Assist. coach)
- 2021–: Al-Shorta (Assist. coach)
- * Club domestic league appearances and goals ‡ National team caps and goals as of 21 August 2016

Hussein Abdul-Wahid Waham Al-Fayyadh (Arabic: حسين عبد الواحد وحام الفياض; born on 28 February 1985 in Baghdad, Iraq) is an Iraqi former football midfielder. He last played for Al-Shorta SC in Iraq where he was the club's captain.

== Career ==
A defensive midfielder that was on the fringes of Yahya Alwan’s Olympic team a couple of years ago. He played for Al-Sinaa and Zakho but finally made a name for himself at Al-Zawraa. Played for Erbil after spending the previous season with Duhok. He then moved to Al-Shorta in 2012. Hussein made his international Iraqi debut against Saudi Arabia and South Korea.

He won the Iraqi League title with Al-Shorta in 2013 and 2019, the latter as captain, and is joint fourth-most successful player in the league's history with six titles.

== Honors ==
=== Clubs ===
Al-Zawraa

- Iraqi Premier League: 2005–06
- Iraqi Premier League: 2015–16

Erbil

- Iraqi Premier League: 2008–09
- Iraqi Premier League: 2011–12

Al-Shorta

- Iraqi Premier League: 2012–13
- Iraqi Premier League: 2018–19
