= Haidar Sabah =

Iraqi footballer

Personal information
- Full name: Haidar Sabah Hassan
- Date of birth: 15 March 1986 (age 40)
- Place of birth: Iraq
- Position: Midfielder

Team information
- Current team: Al-Sinaat Al-Kahrabaiya (Assist. coach)

Youth career
- 1999–2002: Al-Zawraa

Senior career*
Years	Team	Apps	(Gls)
2002–2007	Al-Zawraa	?	(?)
2007–2008	Erbil	?	(3)
2008–2009	Al-Zawraa	26	(5)
2009–2010	Baghdad	0	(0)
2010–2018	Al-Zawraa		
2019–2020	Al-Talaba		

International career^{‡}
2004–2013	Iraq	2	(0)

Managerial career
- 2020–2021: Al-Zawraa (Women's f.a.d.)
- 2021–: Al-Sinaat Al-Kahrabaiya (Assist. coach)
- * Club domestic league appearances and goals ‡ National team caps and goals as of May 27, 2013

Haidar Sabah Hassan (Arabic: حَيْدَر صَبَّاح حَسَن) (born 15 March 1986) is a former Iraq football player, who is currently assistant coach of Al-Sinaat Al-Kahrabaiya. He was part of Iraq B team in the 2007 King's Cup. Haidar Sabah is the nephew of Falah Hassan

== Honours ==
=== Club ===
Erbil SC

- 2007–08 Iraqi Premier League: Champion

Al-Zawraa

- 1st Baghdad Championship: Champion
- 2005–06 Iraqi Premier League: Champion
- 2010–11 Iraqi Premier League: Champion
- 2015–16 Iraqi Premier League: Champion
- 2016–17 Iraq FA Cup: Champion
- 2017 Iraqi Super Cup: Champion
- 2017–18 Iraqi Premier League: Champion

=== Country ===
- 2006 Asian Games Silver medallist.
