= 2011–12 Iraqi Elite League =

Iraqi Elite League
- Season: 2011–12
- Champions: Erbil (4th title)
- Relegated: Al-Karkh; Al-Taji; Al-Shirqat; Al-Hudood
- AFC Cup: Erbil; Duhok
- UAFA Club Cup: Al-Quwa Al-Jawiya
- Matches: 380
- Goals: 839 (2.21 per match)
- Top goalscorer: Hammadi Ahmed (27 goals)
- Biggest home win: Erbil 5–0 Al-Taji (22 February 2012); Duhok 5–0 Al-Shirqat (2 March 2012); Al-Quwa Al-Jawiya 5–0 Al-Shirqat (19 June 2012)
- Biggest away win: Al-Hudood 0–6 Al-Zawraa (7 April 2012); Al-Shirqat 0–6 Duhok (10 August 2012)
- Highest scoring: Al-Hudood 4–4 Al-Taji (25 April 2012)
- Longest winning run: 7 games Erbil
- Longest unbeaten run: 30 games Erbil
- Longest winless run: 26 games Al-Hudood
- Longest losing run: 9 games Al-Hudood

The 2011–12 Iraqi Elite League (known as the Asiacell Elite League for sponsorship reasons) was the 38th season of the competition since its establishment in 1974. The season began on 29 October 2011 and ended on 20 August 2012. It was played in a home-and-away round-robin format for the first time since the 2002–03 season.

Erbil won their fourth league title, earning 83 points from 38 games and losing just one match. Duhok finished as runners-up with Al-Quwa Al-Jawiya in third place.

== League table ==
Pos	Team	Pld	W	D	L	GF	GA	GD	Pts	Qualification or relegation
1	Erbil (C)	38	23	14	1	65	22	+43	83	Qualification for the AFC Cup
2	Duhok	38	21	13	4	57	21	+36	76	Qualification for the AFC Cup
3	Al-Quwa Al-Jawiya	38	21	11	6	61	23	+38	74	Qualification for the UAFA Club Cup
4	Al-Talaba	38	19	11	8	45	29	+16	68	
5	Zakho	38	15	16	7	53	36	+17	61	
6	Baghdad	38	16	12	10	41	26	+15	60	
7	Al-Shorta	38	16	11	11	45	37	+8	59	
8	Al-Zawraa	38	15	11	12	54	35	+19	56	
9	Al-Najaf	38	12	16	10	40	41	−1	52	
10	Al-Naft	38	12	15	11	39	37	+2	51	
11	Al-Minaa	38	13	11	14	40	44	−4	50	
12	Kirkuk	38	13	10	15	38	47	−9	49	
13	Al-Sinaa	38	10	17	11	29	33	−4	47	
14	Al-Kahrabaa	38	12	10	16	51	56	−5	46	
15	Karbala	38	10	14	14	38	44	−6	44	
16	Masafi Al-Wasat	38	9	12	17	24	44	−20	39	
17	Al-Karkh (R)	38	8	10	20	32	49	−17	34	Relegation to the Iraqi First Division League
18	Al-Taji (R)	38	6	16	16	37	66	−29	34	Relegation to the Iraqi First Division League
19	Al-Shirqat (R)	38	7	5	26	24	67	−43	26	Relegation to the Iraqi First Division League
20	Al-Hudood (R)	38	1	7	30	26	82	−56	10	Relegation to the Iraqi First Division League

Source: Goalzz
(C) Champions; (R) Relegated

== Results ==
Home \ Away	HUD	KAH	KAR	MIN	NFT	NJF	QWJ	SHQ	SHR	SIN	TAJ	TLB	ZWR	BGD	ERB	DUH	KRB	KRK	MAS	ZAK
Al-Hudood		1–2	1–1	0–2	2–1	2–2	0–4	1–2	0–2	0–1	4–4	0–2	0–6	0–2	1–2	1–3	2–2	0–1	1–1	1–2
Al-Kahrabaa	2–1		4–0	1–2	1–1	1–1	0–1	1–0	2–1	0–2	2–2	1–1	2–1	3–2	0–3	2–0	1–1	1–0	0–1	1–3
Al-Karkh	1–0	1–1		1–1	0–1	0–2	0–4	1–0	0–0	2–3	2–0	0–1	3–1	0–1	1–1	1–2	3–0	0–1	1–2	1–1
Al-Minaa	3–0	2–3	2–0		0–0	1–1	2–0	2–0	1–2	0–0	3–0	2–1	2–1	1–0	1–4	0–3	1–0	3–3	0–1	0–0
Al-Naft	2–0	1–1	0–0	1–1		1–2	1–2	3–0	1–2	0–0	3–1	1–0	1–0	0–0	1–1	1–1	1–2	3–3	0–0	1–1
Al-Najaf	0–0	2–1	2–1	1–1	0–1		0–0	3–1	0–0	0–0	4–1	3–1	1–0	2–1	0–4	1–0	2–1	1–2	0–1	0–0
Al-Quwa Al-Jawiya	3–1	2–1	4–2	2–1	3–0	3–0		5–0	2–0	1–0	1–0	0–2	1–1	1–0	0–0	0–1	3–2	4–0	3–0	3–0
Al-Shirqat	2–0	1–2	1–2	1–1	0–1	1–1	0–2		0–2	1–0	2–1	0–2	0–0	1–1	0–1	0–6	3–1	2–1	0–0	0–2
Al-Shorta	1–0	3–1	1–0	3–0	3–0	3–1	0–0	1–0		2–1	1–1	1–2	3–2	0–1	1–5	0–1	2–1	0–0	1–0	2–0
Al-Sinaa	4–2	0–0	1–0	0–0	1–0	0–0	2–1	2–1	0–0		1–1	0–1	2–3	0–3	0–1	0–0	0–0	1–0	0–0	1–1
Al-Taji	3–3	2–1	2–1	0–0	2–2	0–0	0–0	3–2	1–0	0–0		1–2	1–6	0–0	0–0	2–2	0–0	2–1	2–0	1–1
Al-Talaba	2–0	3–2	0–2	1–2	0–1	0–0	0–0	3–0 (Note: The Al-Talaba–Al-Shirqat match was awarded as a 3–0 win to Al-Talaba, as Al-Shirqat did not turn up for the game.)	2–1	1–0	1–1		2–1	0–3	1–1	0–0	0–0	2–0	2–2	2–1
Al-Zawraa	1–0	2–1	2–1	2–1	1–0	1–1	1–1	2–0	2–1	1–0	5–2	0–1		1–0	0–0	0–0	0–0	4–0	0–0	1–2
Baghdad	2–0	3–2	0–0	0–1	2–1	2–0	1–0	2–0	0–0	2–2	1–0	0–0	1–1		0–0	0–1	2–0	1–0	1–0	2–2
Erbil	1–0	3–2	1–0	3–0	2–1	3–1	1–1	1–0	0–0	2–0	5–0	2–1	1–0	3–3		2–2	1–0	0–0	2–1	2–1
Duhok	4–0	1–0	1–0	3–1	1–1	2–1	0–0	5–0	1–1	3–0	1–0	0–1	2–1	2–0	1–1		1–0	1–0	0–0	1–1
Karbala	2–1	1–1	3–1	2–0	1–2	1–2	0–0	2–0	2–2	1–1	3–0	0–3	0–3 (Note: The Karbala–Al-Zawraa match was awarded as a 3–0 win to Al-Zawraa, as Karbala did not turn up for the game.)	1–0	1–0	1–1		3–0	2–0	1–1
Kirkuk	4–1	1–1	1–1	1–0	0–1	1–1	1–0	1–0	4–1	1–1	1–0	1–1	1–0	0–2	1–2	0–2	1–1		1–0	2–1
Masafi Al-Wasat	1–0	0–3	0–1	2–0	1–3	1–1	2–3	2–1	0–0	0–1	2–0	0–1	1–1	0–0	0–4	1–0	0–0	1–3		1–3
Zakho	2–0	4–1	1–1	1–0	0–0	2–1	1–1	1–2	3–2	2–2	3–1	0–0	0–0	1–0	0–0	1–2	3–0	2–0	3–0	

Source: Goalzz
Legend: Blue = home team win; Yellow = draw; Red = away team win.

== Season statistics ==
=== Top scorers ===
Pos	Scorer	Goals	Team
1	Hammadi Ahmed	27	Al-Quwa Al-Jawiya
2	Amjad Radhi	23	Erbil
3	Saeed Mohsen	12	Zakho
3	Hussein Karim	12	Duhok
5	Luay Salah	11	Erbil
5	Amjad Kalaf	11	Al-Shorta
5	Husham Mohammed	11	Al-Zawraa
5	Mohannad Abdul-Raheem	11	Al-Karkh / Duhok

=== Hat-tricks ===
Player	For	Against	Result	Date
(Iraq) Hammadi Ahmed^{4}	Al-Quwa Al-Jawiya	Al-Karkh	4–0	2 February 2012
(Iraq) Amjad Radhi	Erbil	Al-Minaa	4–1	12 February 2012
(Iraq) Haider Abdulelah	Al-Najaf	Al-Taji	4–1	2 June 2012
(Iraq) Marwan Hussein	Al-Zawraa	Al-Taji	6–1	17 August 2012

Notes

^{4} Player scored 4 goals
