= Baghdad derbies =

Series of football matches in Iraq

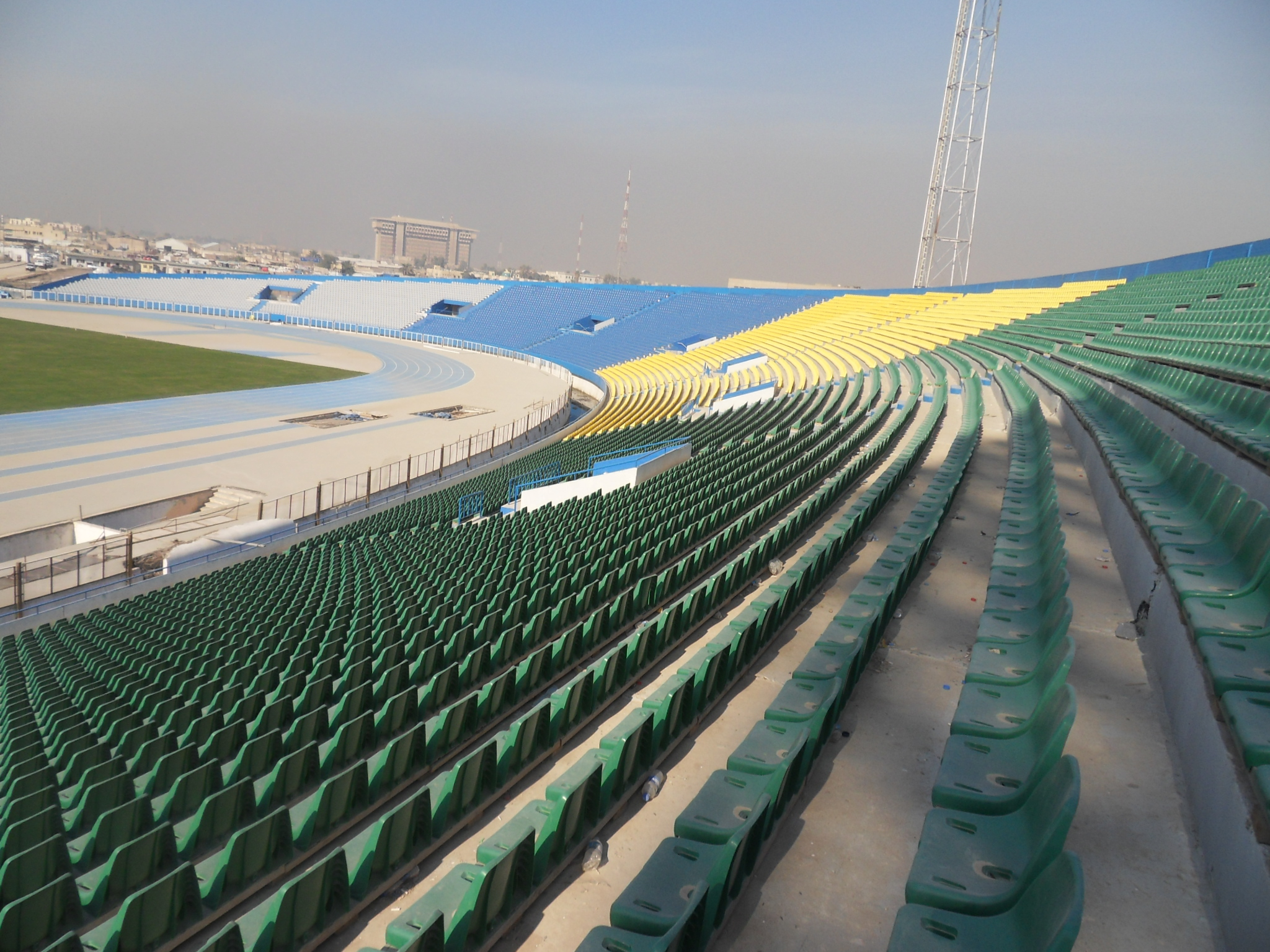
- Al-Shaab Stadium historically hosted most matches between the four sides
- Other names: Iraqi Classico (Al-Quwa Al-Jawiya v Al-Zawraa)
- Location: Baghdad, Iraq
- Teams: Al-Quwa Al-Jawiya; Al-Shorta; Al-Talaba; Al-Zawraa
- First meeting: Al-Quwa Al-Jawiya Al-Malakiya 1–0 Al-Shorta; 1932–33 Prince Ghazi Cup (2 January 1933)
- Latest meeting: Al-Zawraa 4–1 Al-Talaba; 2026–27 Iraq Stars League (20 November 2026)

Statistics
- Largest victory: Al-Zawraa 7–0 Al-Talaba; 7th Umm al-Ma'arik Championship (1997–98)

The Baghdad derbies are a series of derby matches between four Baghdad-based football clubs: Al-Quwa Al-Jawiya, Al-Shorta, Al-Talaba and Al-Zawraa, collectively known as the 'Popular Teams'. (Note: See) They are the four most successful teams in the history of Iraqi football, and league games between the clubs are usually played at the neutral venue of Al-Shaab Stadium to accommodate more spectators. The match between Al-Quwa Al-Jawiya and Al-Zawraa is often referred to as the Iraqi Classico.

Al-Quwa Al-Jawiya were the first to be founded in 1931, and Al-Shorta were founded in 1932, with these two sides developing a strong rivalry during the Iraq Central FA Premier League era. Al-Zawraa and Al-Talaba were founded in 1969, and with the foundation of the Iraqi National Clubs League (now known as Iraq Stars League), a four-way rivalry soon developed in the capital city. None of the four teams have ever been relegated from the Iraq Stars League.

Al-Shorta won the Arab Club Champions Cup in 1982, while Al-Quwa Al-Jawiya won the 2016, 2017 and 2018 editions of the AFC Cup, Asia's second-tier continental tournament. Al-Talaba and Al-Zawraa both previously finished runners-up of the Asian Cup Winners' Cup and fourth place at the Asian Club Championship.

== History ==
=== 1932–1974: Al-Quwa Al-Jawiya and Al-Shorta rivalry ===
The rivalry first developed between Al-Quwa Al-Jawiya Al-Malakiya (Royal Air Force) and Al-Shorta (Police) in the 1930s, the decade where both of the teams were founded. They first faced off on 2 January 1933 in the 1932–33 Prince Ghazi Cup. Al-Quwa Al-Jawiya Al-Malakiya won the match 1–0 through an own goal in the 15th minute and went on to win the trophy that year, as well as winning it in the following two years. The two sides went on to face each other in two cup finals that decade, the 1938 Taha Al-Hashimi Cup final and the 1939 Al-Quwa Al-Jawiya Cup final, and Al-Shorta won both, 1–0 and 2–0 respectively, to win the first two trophies in their history. With the foundation of the Iraq Central FA Premier League, a league for teams from Baghdad and its neighbouring cities, the rivalry grew significantly. Al-Quwa Al-Jawiya Al-Malakiya were awarded a walkover win against Al-Shorta Select XI in the final of the 1957–58 season, while Al-Shorta Select XI beat Al-Quwa Al-Jawiya 1–0 on their way to winning the 1962–63 league title.

=== 1974–1984: Al-Talaba and Al-Zawraa emergence ===
In August 1974, the Iraq Football Association decided to form the Iraqi National Clubs League, later known as the Iraqi Premier League and now known as the Iraq Stars League, the country's first nationwide league of clubs. The very first season of the Premier League in 1974–75 was won by Al-Quwa Al-Jawiya (under the name Al-Tayaran), while Al-Shorta finished in fifth. Meanwhile, Al-Zawraa won the 1974–75 second-tier title and were promoted to the Premier League along with Al-Jamiea (now known as Al-Talaba) for the 1975–76 season. Since then, the four teams have been ever-present in the Stars League and have never been relegated (Al-Quwa Al-Jawiya and Al-Shorta remain the only two teams to have played in every single season of the Iraq Stars League).

Despite being newly promoted, Al-Zawraa became one of the strongest clubs in Iraq, because another club named Al-Naqil (the runners-up of the league in the 1974–75 season) dissolved due to financial problems and their players joined Al-Zawraa. In their first season in the top-flight, Al-Zawraa won the league and also won the FA Cup, becoming Iraq's first national double winners. They went on to win the league title undefeated in both the 1976–77 and 1978–79 seasons, winning the double again in the latter campaign. Al-Shorta won the 1979–80 title and Al-Talaba were crowned champions in the 1980–81 season, meaning that after seven seasons of the Premier League era, all four teams had won the league title. Al-Talaba went on to retain their title, with Al-Zawraa winning a further two FA Cups and Al-Shorta becoming the first ever winners of the Arab Club Champions Cup as the four clubs continued to achieve major honours.

=== 1984–1990: Rise and fall of Al-Rasheed ===
The 1984–85 season saw Al-Rasheed play in the Premier League for the first time. The club was founded a year earlier by Uday Hussein, the son of Iraq's president Saddam Hussein. Uday forced many of Iraq's top players to join Al-Rasheed against their will, with Al-Rasheed not only becoming one of Iraq's best clubs, but one of the best clubs in the region, winning three consecutive Arab Club Champions Cups in 1985, 1986 and 1987 and finishing as Asian Club Championship runners-up in 1989.

Al-Talaba won the 1985–86 title ahead of Al-Rasheed, but the next two seasons saw Al-Rasheed win the double both times. Al-Rasheed also won the 1988–89 league title, but Al-Zawraa were the FA Cup winners that year. The 1989–90 season saw Al-Quwa Al-Jawiya win the league (under the name Al-Tayaran) and Al-Zawraa win the FA Cup. Al-Rasheed were dissolved in 1990, and their replacements Al-Karkh were not able to replicate Al-Rasheed's success.

=== 1990–2006: Four teams dominate Iraqi football ===
The 1990s and early 2000s was the greatest era of success for the four clubs and the era where many of the most memorable derby matches were played. Between 1990 and 2006, every edition of the Premier League, FA Cup and Super Cup was won by one of the four clubs, and only one edition of the Baghdad Championship was not won by one of them. Al-Zawraa were the most successful team of this era, winning eight league titles, eight FA Cups, three Baghdad Championships, and three Super Cups.

Al-Talaba and Al-Zawraa also made their first ever continental final appearances. Al-Talaba reached the final of the 1995 Asian Cup Winners' Cup and Al-Zawraa reached the final of the 1999–2000 edition of the same tournament, but both sides were defeated by Japanese clubs.

=== 2006–2012: Northern clubs outperform Baghdad rivals ===
The 2006–07 Iraqi Premier League made history as Erbil became the first team from outside of Baghdad to win the league since the 1982–83 season. Erbil also won the league the next two seasons as well, becoming the first team from outside Baghdad to win three league titles in a row. The 2008–09 season was the biggest testimony to the shift in power in Iraqi football as none of the four Baghdad rivals finished in the top four places of the league. This remains the only time in history that this has occurred. The trend continued in the 2009–10 season as a different Northern team became champions, this time Duhok. Al-Zawraa briefly brought the title back to Baghdad by winning the 2010–11 title but the Northern teams were back to dominating in the 2011–12 season as Erbil won the title with only one defeat in 38 games with Duhok finishing as runners-up.

A main reason for the rise of the Northern sides was the poor security situation and economic instability in Baghdad following the US invasion of Iraq in 2003, meaning the top players preferred to move to the north of the country, thus diminishing the impact of the Baghdad derbies on the league title race. Al-Shorta and Al-Talaba were almost relegated in the 2010–11 season, surviving on goal difference and by one point respectively.

=== 2012–present: Baghdad derbies return to the forefront ===
The dominance of the Northern clubs was ended in the 2012–13 season when Al-Shorta won the league title. All league titles since the 2015–16 season have been won by either Al-Zawraa, Al-Quwa Al-Jawiya or Al-Shorta. The two most prominent Northern clubs, Erbil and Duhok, both fell into severe financial difficulty; Duhok had to withdraw from the 2015–16 Iraqi Premier League and Erbil had to withdraw from the 2016–17 Iraqi Premier League, meaning both teams were relegated to the Iraqi First Division League, the country's second-tier. Al-Quwa Al-Jawiya also won Asia's second-tier club competition, the AFC Cup, in 2016, 2017 and 2018. In the 2021–22 season, Al-Shorta became the first club to win all Baghdad derbies home and away in the same league season, conceding just one goal across the six games. Al-Shorta then went on to become the first club in Iraq to win four consecutive league titles (2021–22, 2022–23, 2023–24 and 2024–25).

== Results ==
As of 20 November 2026.

=== Al-Quwa Al-Jawiya vs. Al-Shorta ===
Competition	Matches	Wins		Draws	Goals	
Competition	Matches	QWJ	SHR	Draws	QWJ	SHR
Stars League	89	27	27	35	96	97
Annulled Stars League matches	1	0	1	0	0	1
FA Cup	6	1	1	4	7	6
Baghdad Championship	6	4	2	0	16	9
Additional play-offs	2	0	1	1	3	4
Total	104	32	32	40	122	117

=== Al-Quwa Al-Jawiya vs. Al-Talaba ===
Competition	Matches	Wins		Draws	Goals	
Competition	Matches	QWJ	TLB	Draws	QWJ	TLB
Stars League	89	35	24	30	116	95
Annulled Stars League matches	1	0	0	1	0	0
Stars League qualifiers	1	0	1	0	0	1
FA Cup	4	0	1	3	1	6
Super Cup	1	0	1	0	1	2
Baghdad Championship	13	2	6	5	7	13
Total	109	37	33	39	125	117

=== Al-Quwa Al-Jawiya vs. Al-Zawraa ===
Competition	Matches	Wins		Draws	Goals	
Competition	Matches	QWJ	ZWR	Draws	QWJ	ZWR
Stars League	91	29	33	29	106	115
FA Cup	18	5	7	6	17	23
Super Cup	5	2	2	1	5	4
Baghdad Championship	8	3	5	0	7	11
AFC Cup	2	1	0	1	2	1
Total	124	40	47	37	137	154

=== Al-Shorta vs. Al-Talaba ===
Competition	Matches	Wins		Draws	Goals	
Competition	Matches	SHR	TLB	Draws	SHR	TLB
Stars League	86	34	31	21	94	103
Annulled Stars League matches	1	0	1	0	0	1
FA Cup	7	2	3	2	7	8
Baghdad Championship	11	2	5	4	14	19
Total	105	38	40	27	115	131

=== Al-Shorta vs. Al-Zawraa ===
Competition	Matches	Wins		Draws	Goals	
Competition	Matches	SHR	ZWR	Draws	SHR	ZWR
Stars League	88	24	35	29	89	107
Stars League qualifiers	1	1	0	0	1	0
FA Cup	11	0	10	1	9	29
Super Cup	2	0	1	1	1	2
Baghdad Championship	12	2	5	5	13	21
Total	114	27	51	36	113	159

=== Al-Talaba vs. Al-Zawraa ===
Competition	Matches	Wins		Draws	Goals	
Competition	Matches	TLB	ZWR	Draws	TLB	ZWR
Stars League	91	24	44	23	72	118
Annulled Stars League matches	1	0	1	0	2	3
Premier Division League	One match in the 1974–75 season; result unknown					
FA Cup	13	4	8	1	9	18
Super Cup	1	0	0	1	2	2
Baghdad Championship	10	4	5	1	15	24
Total	116	32	58	26	100	165

== Honours ==
Honour	Al-Quwa Al-Jawiya	Al-Shorta	Al-Talaba	Al-Zawraa
National
Iraq Stars League	8	8	5	14
Iraqi National First Division (defunct)	1	—	—	—
Iraq FA Cup	6	1	2	16
Iraqi Super Cup	2	2	1	5
Baghdad Championship (defunct)	3	3	3	3
Continental / Regional
AFC Cup / AFC Champions League Two	3	—	—	—
Arab Club Champions Cup	—	1	—	—
Total	23	15	11	38

== See also ==
- List of association football club rivalries in Asia and Oceania
- Football in Iraq
