= Ahmed Ali Jaber =

Iraqi footballer

Ahmed Ali
Personal information
- Date of birth: 2 August 1982 (age 44)
- Place of birth: Baghdad, Iraq
- Height: 1.75 m (5 ft 9 in)
- Position: Goalkeeper

Senior career*
Years	Team	Apps	(Gls)
1999–2004	Al-Zawraa	37	(0)
2004	Sanat Naft		
2004–2008	Al-Zawraa		
2008–2010	Erbil		

International career^{‡}
2001–2007	Iraq	14	(0)
Medal record
Men's football
Representing Iraq
AFC Asian Cup
Winner	2007 Indonesia/Malaysia/ Thailand/Vietnam
- * Club domestic league appearances and goals as of 18 May 2007 ‡ National team caps and goals as of 28 October 2007

Ahmed Ali Jaber (Arabic: أحمد علي جبر) (born 2 August 1982 in Baghdad, Iraq) is a former Iraqi football goalkeeper. He was part of the Iraq national football team. He played in all four of Iraq's matches in the 2004 AFC Asian Cup. However, he finished the campaign on a low, having been sent off in the quarter-finals against China after lashing out at China's Sun Jihai. After losing his place to Noor Sabri in the 2004 Olympic Games, the Al Zawra’a goalkeeper returned to the national team in the Gulf Cup in the same year. He had a brief spell with Sanat Naft in Iran before returning to Al Zawra’a. On 16 September, he was released along with seven other players by Arbil FC.

He was one of the stars at the 2000 Asian Youth Championship in Tehran and clinched Iraq's place in the final of the Asian Youth Championship against Japan, beating Iran 7–6 on penalties after extra-time. Ahmed hammered home his spot-kick after saving the effort of Iranian striker Mansour Jamalyan and 2 other Iranian players, Ahmed then raced the length of the field to celebrate with the Iraqi fans before collapsing in a heap, overcome by the emotion.

However, he missed the final due to a yellow card he picked up after time wasting in the 90th minute. After his heroics in Iran, he was voted Iraqi goalkeeper of the year of 2000.

== Honours ==
=== Country ===
- 2007 Asian Cup winners
