= Luay Salah =

Iraqi footballer (born 1982)

Personal information
- Full name: Luay Salah Hassan Al-Khafaji
- Date of birth: 7 February 1982 (age 44)
- Place of birth: Baghdad, Iraq
- Height: 1.75 m (5 ft 9 in)
- Positions: Second striker; striker

Team information
- Current team: Al-Minaa (Manager)

Senior career*
Years	Team	Apps	(Gls)
1998–2001	Al-Quwa Al-Jawiya		(9)
2001–2002	Al-Zawraa		(3)
2002–2006	Al-Quwa Al-Jawiya		(19)
2006–2007	Persepolis	8	(1)
2007–2015	Erbil		(80)
2015–2018	Al-Zawraa		(10)
Total		–	(122)

International career^{‡}
2002–2012	Iraq	23	(4)

Managerial career
- 2019–2020: Al-Quwa Al-Jawiya (Assist. coach)
- 2020–2021: Naft Al-Wasat (Assist. coach)
- 2021: Naft Al-Wasat (Caretaker)
- 2021: Erbil SC
- 2021–2024: Al-Kahrabaa
- 2024–2025: Al-Quwa Al-Jawiya
- 2025–2026: Al-Minaa
- 2026–: Al-Zawraa
Medal record
Men's football
Representing Iraq
AFC Asian Cup
Winner	2007 Indonesia/Malaysia/ Thailand/Vietnam
- * Club domestic league appearances and goals ‡ National team caps and goals as of 10 July 2009

Luay Salah Hassan Al-Khafaji (Arabic: لُؤَيّ صَلَاح حَسَن الْخَفَاجِيّ; born 7 February 1982) is an Iraqi former football player and coach of Al-Zawraa. He played for the Iraq national team as well as for the Al-Quwa Al-Jawiya, Al-Zawraa, Persepolis and Erbil clubs. He scored 121 Iraqi Premier League goals in his career.

== Info ==
After helping Al Quwa Al Jawiya to the Iraq league title in 2005, Louay Salah Hassan moved to Iran Pro League side Persepolis the following season. The 25-year-old striker gained AFC Champions League experience with Al Quwa Al Jawiya in 2004, scoring a goal against Al Sadd. He was part of the Iraq national team which won the gold medal at the West Asian Games in 2005.

Salah excelled at club level, scoring ten times to steer Arbil FC to the Iraqi league championship in the 2007/08 season, an achievement that earned the club a place at this year's AFC Cup.

At the continental level he netted two goals in the ensuing AFC Cup to steer Arbil FC through to the last 16. In the all-Iraqi affair against compatriots Al Zawra'a, he was again on target as his club emerged 3–1 winners to book a place in the quarter-finals.

The 27-year-old's scoring did not go unnoticed by the newly appointed Iraq coach Bora Miluntinovic, who rewarded him with a place in Iraq's FIFA Confederation Cup squad.

== International goals ==
Scores and results list Iraq's goal tally first.

#	Date	Venue	Opponent	Score	Result	Competition
1	23 November 2002	Hamad bin Khalifa Stadium, Doha	Bahrain	2–2	2–2	Friendly match
2	1 December 2005	Ahmed bin Ali Stadium, Al Rayyan	Palestine	3–0	4–0	2005 West Asian Games
3	8 December 2005	Ahmed bin Ali Stadium, Al Rayyan	Saudi Arabia	1–0	2–0	2005 West Asian Games
4	10 July 2009	Franso Hariri Stadium, Arbil	Palestine	3–0	3–0	Friendly match

== Coaching career ==
=== Al-Quwa Al-Jawiya ===
Luay Salah started as an assistant coach to Ayoub Odisho in Al-Quwa Al-Jawiya in march of 2019.

== Managerial statistics ==
As of match played 16 July 2022

Managerial record by team and tenure
Team	From	To	Record					Ref.
Team	From	To	P	W	D	L	Win %	Ref.
Naft Al-Wasat SC (Caretaker)	19 January 2021	21 January 2021	1	0	1	0	0.0	
Erbil SC	11 February 2021	15 May 2021	14	4	5	5	28.6	
Al-Kahrabaa FC	9 August 2021	""Present""	43	16	12	15	37.2	
Total			58	20	18	20	34.5	—

== Honours ==
=== Club ===
Al-Quwa Al-Jawiya

- Iraqi Premier League: 2004–05

Erbil

- Iraqi Premier League: 2007–08, 2008–09, 2011–12

Al-Zawraa

- Iraqi Premier League: 2015–16, 2017–18
- Iraq FA Cup: 2016–17
- Iraqi Super Cup: 2017

=== Country ===
- 2005 West Asian Games Gold medallist.
- 2007 Asian Cup winner
- 2012 Arab Nations Cup Bronze medallist

=== Individual ===
Iraqi Premier League

- Top Goal Scorer: 2010-11

=== As a Manager ===
Al-Kahrabaa

- Iraq FA Cup runners-up: 2021–22
