= Sarmad Rasheed =

Iraqi footballer

Personal information
- Full name: Sarmad Salih Rasheed
- Date of birth: January 1, 1982 (age 44)
- Place of birth: Baghdad, Iraq
- Position: Goalkeeper

Team information
- Current team: Baghdad FC
- Number: 30

Senior career*
Years	Team	Apps	(Gls)
2004–2008	Al-Zawraa		
2008–	Baghdad FC		

International career^{‡}
2005	Iraq	2	(0)
- * Club domestic league appearances and goals ‡ National team caps and goals as of 25 July 2006

Sarmad Salih Rasheed (Arabic: سرمد صالح رشيد) (born 1 January 1982 in Baghdad, Iraq) is an Iraqi football goalkeeper. He played for the Iraq national football team in 2005 and plays for Baghdad FC in Iraq.
