= Amjad Radhi =

Iraqi footballer

Personal information
- Full name: Amjad Radhi Yousif Al-Janabi
- Date of birth: 17 July 1990 (age 36)
- Place of birth: Baghdad, Iraq
- Height: 1.82 m (6 ft 0 in)
- Position: Striker

Youth career
- 2005–2007: Al-Quwa Al-Jawiya

Senior career*
| Years | Team | Apps | (Gls) |
| 2007–2011 | Al-Quwa Al-Jawiya | 74 | (55) |
| 2011–2015 | Erbil | 70 | (61) |
| 2015–2016 | Al-Raed | 19 | (7) |
| 2016 | Smouha | 1 | (0) |
| 2016–2021 | Al-Quwa Al-Jawiya | 95 | (42) |
| 2021–2022 | Al-Najaf | 20 | (8) |
| 2022–2024 | Erbil | | (14) |

International career^{‡}
| 2011 | Iraq U-23 | 6 | (2) |
| 2010–2015 | Iraq | 35 | (2) |
- * Club domestic league appearances and goals as of 1 July 2024 ‡ National team caps and goals as of 11 June 2015

Amjad Radhi Yousif Al-Janabi (Arabic: أمجد راضي; born 17 July 1990) is an Iraqi professional footballer who last played for Erbil in the Iraqi Premier League. He won the 2009–10 Iraqi Premier League and 2012–13 Iraqi Premier League top scorer awards, as well as the 2012 AFC Cup top scorer award. He is the Iraqi Premier League's all-time record goalscorer with 180 goals.

== Club career ==
The youngster's goal-scoring rate is remarkable even by Asian standards. He scored a remarkable 31 goals in the 2009/10 Iraqi Premier League season. Having finished last year's AFC Cup as top-scorer with Arbil with nine goals, he has continued to cause havoc this season, being on target four times as his side established a six-point cushion at the summit.

He scored an impressive 23 goals during the 2011–12 Iraqi Premier League to help his Erbil to the title and win his first Iraqi premier league title.

Radhi served a one-year suspension from football in 2019 after four prohibited substances were found in his sample.

== International career ==
He made his debut for Iraq against Jordan in September 2010, he scored his first goal for Iraq on 18 December 2012 in a match against Oman.

=== International goals ===
Scores and results list Iraq's goal tally first.

| # | Date | Venue | Opponent | Score | Result | Competition |
|---|---|---|---|---|---|---|
| 1. | 18 December 2012 | Ali Sabah Al-Salem Stadium, Al Farwaniyah, Kuwait | Oman | 1–0 | 2–0 | 2012 WAFF Championship |
| 2. | 6 October 2013 | Camille Chamoun Sports City Stadium, Beirut, Lebanon | Yemen | 1–0 | 3–2 | Friendly match |

== Honours ==
Erbil

- Iraqi Premier League: 2011–12
- AFC Cup runner-up: 2012, 2014

Al-Quwa Al-Jawiya

- Iraqi Premier League: 2016–17, 2020–21
- Iraq FA Cup: 2020–21
- AFC Cup: 2016, 2017, 2018

Iraq

- WAFF Championship runner-up: 2012

Individual

- Iraqi Premier League top scorer: 2009–10, 2012–13
- AFC Cup joint top scorer: 2012

Records

- Iraqi Premier League all-time record goalscorer (180 goals)
