= Yassir Raad =

Iraqi footballer

Personal information
- Full name: Yassir Raad Mohammed
- Date of birth: 25 June 1983 (age 43)
- Place of birth: Iraq
- Height: 1.76 m (5 ft 9 in)
- Position: Defender

Team information
- Current team: Sulaymaniya FC
- Number: 13

Youth career
- Al-Istiqlal
- Al-Shorta

Senior career*
| Years | Team | Apps | (Gls) |
| 2001–2002 | Al-Istiqlal | | |
| 2002–2005 | Al-Shorta | | |
| 2005–2006 | Al-Zawraa | | |
| 2006–2010 | Arbil FC | | |
| 2010–2011 | Duhok FC | | |
| 2011–2012 | Zakho FC | 2 | (1) |
| 2012–2013 | Al Naft | | |
| 2013 | Sulaymaniya FC | | |
| 2013–2020 | Naft Maysan FC | | |

International career^{‡}
| 2002–2010 | Iraq | 29 | (0) |
- * Club domestic league appearances and goals as of December 10, 2006 ‡ National team caps and goals as of 1 October 2010

Yassir Raad Mohammed (Arabic: يَاسِر رَعْد مُحَمَّد; born 25 June 1983 in Iraq) is an Iraqi defender who plays for Sulaymaniya FC.

The left-side Al-Zawraa player is capable of playing in defence, as well as midfield. Yassir has been one of the Iraqi league's top defenders for the past four years, having played for Al-Defaa Al-Jawiya (now Al-Istiqlal), Al-Shorta, Al-Zawraa and now Arbil FC. He was first selected for the Olympic team by Wathik Naji in October, 2002. The former Iraqi national coach picked a squad of twenty-four players from a list of 217 players; A month later, German coach Bernd Stange took over the team and Yassir made his international debut for Iraq in the 2-2 draw with Bahrain in Doha. At the end of the war, Yassir played at the 2003 Arab Club Championship in Cairo, where he played against Kuwait SC, Al-Jaish and Zamalek, which would be one of his last appearances for the Police Club before he moved to Al-Zawraa. He was recalled by coach Adnan Hamad and played a part in the side’s 5-1 demolition of Al-Nasr at the Emir Abdullah Al-Faisal Cup in Abha; the team reached went all the way to the final where they beat Morocco 1-0. He was used sparely by coach Hamad making only two appearances in the qualifiers for the 2004 Summer Olympics in Athens, as well as giving him a starting place in the friendly against South Korea in Seoul in April.

== Honours ==
=== Country ===
- 2005 West Asian Games Gold medallist.
