= Ahmed Salah Alwan =

Iraqi footballer (born 1982)

Ahmed Salah
Personal information
- Full name: Ahmed Salah Alwan
- Date of birth: 18 June 1982 (age 44)
- Place of birth: Iraq
- Height: 1.79 m (5 ft 10 in)
- Position: Striker

Team information
- Current team: Iraq U20 (head coach)

Youth career
- 1990–1996: Al-Omal

Senior career*
Years	Team	Apps	(Gls)
1998–2000	Al-Zawraa	?	(?)
2000–2004	Al-Talaba	?	(?)
2004	→ Al-Zamalek (loan)	?	(0)
2004–2005	Al-Shamal	?	(2)
2005	Al-Talaba	?	(?)
2005–2006	Al-Ittihad	?	(2)
2006	Al-Talaba	?	(?)
2006–2010	Erbil	?	(42)
2010–2012	Duhok	?	(?)
2012–2014	Al-Talaba	?	(?)

International career^{‡}
2002–2008	Iraq	29	(5)

Managerial career
- 2013–2015: Erbil (assistant)
- 2015: Erbil (caretaker)
- 2015–2016: Erbil (assistant)
- 2016: Naft Al-Wasat (assistant)
- 2017–2018: Al-Shorta (assistant)
- 2018: Al-Shorta (caretaker)
- 2018–2019: Al-Shorta (assistant)
- 2019: Al-Shorta (caretaker)
- 2019–2020: Al-Shorta (assistant)
- 2020–2021: Zakho
- 2021: Al-Kahrabaa
- 2021–2022: Al-Shorta (assistant)
- 2022: Iraq (assistant)
- 2023: Al-Shorta
- 2023–2024: Al-Talaba
- 2024: Al-Shorta
- 2025–: Iraq U20
- 2026: → Al-Shorta (loan)
- * Club domestic league appearances and goals as of July 16, 2009 ‡ National team caps and goals as of 24 January 2008

Ahmed Salah (Arabic: أَحْمَد صَلَاح عَلْوَان; born June 18, 1982, in Iraq) is an Iraqi football manager and former player who is currently the head coach of the Iraq national under-20 football team.

== Career ==
Ahmed Salah started playing in the Baghdad district of Al-Dora and his school team before moving to the Al-Omal youth team where he spent six years. A move to Al-Zawraa quickly followed before he was called up into the Iraqi Under-17s – helping the team to the AFC U-17 Championship 1998 where he scored four goals in four games in Doha, Qatar. He was called into the Iraqi Under-19s by Thair Jassim and helped the team to qualify to the AFC Youth Championship 2000 in Tehran, Iran scoring in the 6–0 win over the Maldives in Rajshahi, Bangladesh. The starlet was one of three players left out on standby along with Alaa Sattar and Luay Salah for the finals in Tehran.

In September 2000, Salah was called up to the Iraq B team in an International Tournament held in Indonesia, helping the team to runners-up spot behind a full-strength Indonesian national team.

In 2000 Salah decided to join Al-Talaba along with fellow Al-Zawraa team-mates Khalid Mohammed Sabbar and Husham Ali. At the club, Ahmed was given more opportunities in the first team then at Al-Zawraa and clearly repaid the confidence the club showed in him with his match winning performances, helping the team to the league and cup double in 2002.

Salah made his debut for Iraq at the end 2002, and has been a regular in Adnan Hamad's Olympic squad. He was part of Iraq Olympic team in the 2004 Summer Olympic Games which finished 4th.

In The Arab Champions League 2003-2004 Ahmad Salah scored 6 goals and helped Al-Talaba to reach the 3rd stage, Al-Talaba was 1 point behind qualifying to the semi-finals.

He signed a deal to play for Egyptian giants Al-Zamalek with team-mate Salih Sadir but his career in Egypt wasn't successful, he moved to Qatar and played with Al-Shamal few matches and scored 2 goals, played with the Syrian team Al-Ittihad and also scored 2 goals, but he did not success with the teams he played outside Iraq.

After the unsuccessful seasons outside Iraq, Ahmad Salah signed with Erbil and he assisted his team to win Iraq Super League and he won the Iraq Super League Top scorers award with 11 goals.

In December 2007, Erbil played in the 2007 King's Cup as Iraq B team and Salah was one of Erbil's main strikers, he scored the opening goal of the 3–1 victory over Uzbekistan and he helped the team to reach the King's Cup final, and they became runner-up after lose to Thailand 0–1.

Alwan had a successful four years in Erbil forming a striking partnership with Luay Salah to lead them to three championships at his time at the club. On 16 September he was released along with 7 other players by Erbil SC.

=== Managerial statistics ===
As of 26 July 2021

Team	Nat	From	To	Record				
Team	Nat	From	To	G	W	D	L	Win %
Erbil SC (Caretaker)	(Iraq)	28 April 2015	13 May 2015	3	1	2	0	33.33
Al-Shorta SC (Caretaker)	(Iraq)	28 March 2018	7 April 2018	2	1	1	0	50.00
Al-Shorta SC (Caretaker)	(Iraq)	19 July 2019	23 July 2019	1	0	0	1	0.00
Zakho FC	(Iraq)	28 June 2020	13 February 2021	24	11	10	3	45.83
Al-Kahrabaa FC	(Iraq)	11 April 2021	26 July 2021	14	5	6	3	35.71
Total				44	18	19	7	40.91

== International goals ==
Scores and results list Iraq's goal tally first.

#	Date	Venue	Opponent	Score	Result	Competition
1.	23 November 2003	Hamad bin Khalifa Stadium, Doha	Bahrain	1–2	2–2	Friendly
2.	18 February 2004	Pakhtakor Markaziy Stadium, Tashkent	Uzbekistan	1–0	1–1	2006 FIFA World Cup qualification
3.	1 December 2005	Ahmed bin Ali Stadium, Al Rayyan	Palestine	4–0	4–0	2005 West Asian Games
4.	15 November 2006	Helong Sports Center Stadium, Changsha	China	1–1	1–1	2007 AFC Asian Cup qualification
5.	16 October 2007	Thani bin Jassim Stadium, Doha	Qatar	1–0	2–3	Friendly

== Honours ==
=== Player ===
==== Country ====
- 4th place in 2004 Athens Olympics
- 2005 West Asian Games Gold medallist.

==== Club ====
- Iraqi Premier League
  - Winner:6
    - 1999 with Al-Zawra'a SC
    - 2000 with Al-Zawra'a SC
    - 2002 with Talaba SC
    - 2006/2007 with Erbil SC
    - 2007/2008 with Erbil SC
    - 2008/2009 with Erbil SC
- Iraq FA Cup
  - Winner:4
    - 1999 with Al-Zawra'a SC
    - 2000 with Al-Zawra'a SC
    - 2002 with Talaba SC
    - 2003 with Talaba SC

Damascus International Championship

  - Winner:1
    - 2005 with Talaba SC

Syrian Premier League

  - Winner 1
    - 2005/2006 with Al-Ittihad SC Aleppo

Syrian Cup

  - Winner 2
    - 2005 with Al-Ittihad SC Aleppo
    - 2006 with Al-Ittihad SC Aleppo

==== Individual ====
- 12th Umm al-Ma'arik Championship Player of the Tournament
- 1st Baghdad Championship Player of the Tournament

=== Manager ===
- Iraqi Premier League
  - Winner:1
    - 2023 with Al-Shorta SC

Awards
Preceded by Sahib Abbas	Iraq Super League Top scorer 2007	Succeeded by Assad Abdul-Nabi
