= Rafid Badr Al-Deen =

Iraqi footballer

Personal information
- Full name: Rafid Badr Al-Deen Ahmad
- Date of birth: September 30, 1976 (age 50)
- Place of birth: Iraq
- Positions: Defender; full back; wingback

Senior career*
Years	Team	Apps	(Gls)
1996–2000	Turkoman FC		
2000–	Arbil FC		

International career
2000–	Iraq	14	(0)
- * Club domestic league appearances and goals

Rafid Badr Al-Deen Ahmad (Arabic: رَافِد بَدْر الدِّين أَحْمَد; born 30 September 1976) is an Iraqi football defender who played for Arbil FC in Iraq from 2000 to 2009.
