= Erbil SC =

Association football club in Iraq

- Full name: Erbil Sports Club
- Nicknames: The Yellow Castle; The Mother Club; The Emperor
- Founded: 3 November 1968; 57 years ago
- Ground: Franso Hariri Stadium
- Capacity: 25,000
- Chairman: Safin Yassin
- Manager: Basim Qasim
- League: Iraq Stars League
- 2025–26: Iraq Stars League, 3rd of 20
Home colours	Away colours

Erbil Sports Club (Kurdish: یانەی وەرزشی ھەولێر, romanized: Yaney Werzişî Hewlêr, Arabic: نادي أربيل الرياضي) is an Iraqi professional sports club based in the city of Erbil, Kurdistan Region. Its football section plays in the Iraq Stars League, the first-tier of Iraqi football.

Erbil are one of the most successful teams in Iraq, and the most successful from the Kurdish region, having won the league title 4 times. In 2012, Erbil became the first Iraqi team to reach the final of the AFC Cup, a feat they repeated in 2014, but lost both times. Erbil also fields a football team in the Kurdistan Premier League, as well as a team in the majority of sports across the country.

== History ==
=== Early history and promotion to the top division ===
Erbil SC was founded on 3 November 1968, by the former Kurdistan-Iraq Football Association and spent decades in regional leagues and lower league competitions. The team finally qualified for the top division for the first time in the 1987-88 season, where they finished 15th out of 16th in the league, however the team escaped relegation as the FA decided to not relegate any team due to a planned expansion on the league. The following season, the FA adapted a bizarre league and playoff style, teams where split into one of four groups, where the top two teams from each group come together to play a knockout style playoff. Erbil surprisingly finished in the top ten. In the 1989-1990 season, Erbil would finish bottom of the league with only 8 points, however they would once again benefit from the FA deciding to increase the number of teams, and as such escaped relegation.

=== 1990s ===
At the halfway stage of the 1990-91 season, Erbil were forced to withdraw from the competition due to the 1991 uprisings in Iraq. so the Iraq U19 team was brought in to play the remaining half of the season.

The club was allowed to stay in the league, after it was decided that their withdrawal was outside of their control in the previous season. In the 1991–92 season, Erbil finished bottom of the league with 19 points from 38 matches, however that season the FA decided that the bottom three teams would play a play-off to decide the relegated team, Erbil managed to survive the playoffs, meaning they managed to stay in the league despite finishing bottom for the third time in their young history.

Erbil would continue to avoid relegation for three more seasons, however their stint in the stars league came to an end in the 94-95 season where they finished in the bottom 12 teams, all of whom were relegated.

Erbil would spend the next four seasons in the second division, before winning the 1998-99 second division title, which earned them a return to the top flight ahead of the new Millennium. In their best ever result up to that point, Erbil finished 10th that season, with the team winning 70 points in a 50-game season. That same year, Erbil beat Nineveh side Makhmur 13–0 in the Iraqi FA Cup, which is the second-largest margin of victory in the competition's history.

=== 2000s and rise to the top of domestic football ===
ier Erbil finished 6th in the 2001-02 season, continuing their upward trajectory in domestic football.

The following two seasons were abandoned due to the 2003 Iraq war and the ensuing internal conflicts, which made it unsafe to continue holding football matches.

The football federation was successful in hosting the 2004–05 season, where Erbil reached the final stage but finished 2nd in their group behind Al Quwa Al Jawiya.

In the summer of 2005, Nadhim Shaker left rivals Duhok SC to coach Erbil. In the 2005–06 season, Erbil started slow, only just managing to finish third in Group A just ahead of Sirwan FC on goal difference to advance to the second round. Erbil topped their group in the second round to advance to the end of season play-offs where they met southern giants Najaf FC in a two-legged home and away tie. Erbil were beaten by Najaf by a 4–1 scoreline which basically dented all hope of reaching the play-off final for the title. In the home leg, Erbil were winning 1–0 when the match got suspended with a replay taking place five days later with the match resulting in a 1–1 scoreline. This meant Erbil were knocked out of a chance of winning the championship but would instead take part in the third-place play-off match. This match did not take place as in the other semi-final match between the two Baghdad giants, Al-Quwa Al-Jawiya and Al-Zawra'a. The second match of the leg was cancelled as the Al-Quwa players walked off the pitch, resulting in their disqualification and Erbil getting the automatic third-place finish. All in all, it was a strong first season under Shaker and that summer the team improved personnel ready for the next season. Their 3rd-place finish meant that the team would qualify to the Arab Club Championship.

The great season that Erbil enjoyed led to a spur of investment, combined with the several deteriorating security situation in Baghdad and the southern provinces, Erbil became the premier destination for local players, including Luay Salah, and the runner up top goal scorer of the previous season, Mustafa Karim. Erbil rode that momentum throughout the season, leading to them winning the league title for the first time in the 06-07 season. Erbil became the first Kurdish club to win the Iraqi league title, and only the third team outside of Baghdad to win the title. Ahmed Salah was the top goal scorer that season, the first time a player from Erbil to finish as top goal scorer of the season, and the team was captained by Rafid Badr Al-Deen.

Winning the Iraqi league meant that Erbil would take part of the Asian Champions League for the first time ever Their first match was against Qatari sideAl-Gharafa SC, which finished in a 1–1 draw. The team finished 3rd in group D with 8 points.

The team hired Akram Salman to be the team's new coach. The side would continue their great performances locally heading into the following season. the team would finish top of their group in the first two stages, as they reached the final of the playoffs to decide the league champions, in front of a crowd of 50,000 fans in Baghdad, defeated Al-Zawraa'a to retain their league title, after Ahmed Salah Alwan scored the winner in the 99th minute during extra time

Due to the poor performance of Iraqi clubs in the Asian Champions League, the club would qualify to Asia's second-tier club competition, The AFC Cup. The team reached the quarter final before they lost against Al-Kuwait club. Ahead of the 08-09 season, Erbil hired manager Thair Ahmed to replace Akram Salman. The team also signed Ismail Bango and Camara Flouseen, who became the first foreign players to play in Iraq. The change in personnel did not effect Erbil, who won their third straight league title, after beating Al Najaf on penalties. The duo of Ahmed Salah and Luay Salah finished as the top two top goal scorers in the league, with 15 and 11 goals respectively.

=== 4th league title and focus on Asian campaigns ===
Ahead of the 2009–10 Iraqi Premier League, Erbil aimed to become the first Iraqi team to win the league title 4 times in a row. They started off the season strong, finishing top of the Northern group, as well as top of Group 2 to reach the Semi Final against Al-Talaba, in the home leg played on the Franso Hariri Stadium, Erbil missed two penalties during the match, which ended in a 1–0 defeat. Al-Talaba went on the defensive in the return leg and managed to secure a 0–0 draw which was enough to knock Erbil out of title contention on aggregate. Erbil's northern rivals Duhok would go on to win the league.

The following season, Erbil aimed to re-gain their supremacy over the Iraqi league title, this time under the tutelage of Ayoub Odisho. Erbil once again topped the Northern group, qualifying to the final to face Al-Zawra'a. The match ended in a draw, and Al-Zawra'a won on penalties, with Nabeel Sabah missing a penalty in the shootout. Striker Luay Salah was the league's top goal scorer. In the 2011 AFC Cup, Erbil reached the Semi Final, before losing against Al Kuwait

Erbil finally broke their trophy draught and returned to winning ways in the 11-12 season. The league format returned to a traditional round-robin format. The team dominated throughout the season under Syrian manager Nizar Mahrous, losing only one league match, against Karbala SC. Amjad Radhi was the team's top goal scorer during the season, and the second in the league overall with 23 goals. Radhi was also influential in the 2012 AFC Cup, where he was joint top goal scorer as Erbil reached the final of the tournament, but lost 4–0 to Kuwait SC.

In the 12-13 season, Amjad Radhi continued his great goalscoring form, finishing as the league's top goal scorer. However that was not enough to win the league, as Erbil finished in 2nd place, two points behind Al-Shorta. Erbil threatened to withdraw from the league after the team suffered racist chants in their match against Al-Quwa Al-Jawiya, however the team finished out the season as scheduled. In the 2013 AFC Cup, the team lost to Syrian side Al-Shorta in the round of 16.

The following season was ended prematurely while Erbil were in second place due to the ISIS invasion of Iraq. Erbil reached the final of the 2014 AFC Cup, once again losing to a Kuwaiti side, this time to Qadsia SC on penalties. Hawar Mulla Mohammed and Ali Faez missed in the shootout.

The following season, Erbil aimed to break their duck in Asia and push hard for a continental trophy, signing both Nashat Akram and Younis Mahmoud specifically to play in the 2015 AFC Cup That plan ended in failure as the team was knocked out from the group stage.

=== Financial difficulties and relegation ===
After a decade of dominating domestic football and reaching two continental finals, financial burdens hit Erbil hard. The team was bailed out in February 2015 by the local government, receiving a US$400,000 grant in order to finish the season. This came after the club had already sold prominent players such as Jalal Hassan, Saad Abdul-Amir, Amjad Radhi and Saif Salman The team managed to finish 6th in their group in the 14-15 season, far from where they are used to

The following season, the team finished in 6th place in their group again. Erbil were relegated due to their withdrawal, returning to the second tier for the first time since 1999

=== Promotion and third stint in the Premier League ===
Erbil bounced back to the Premier League, finishing 2nd in the 2017–18 Iraqi First Division League. Erbil continued to struggle with financial difficulties, which led to a number of disappointing campaigns. In 2020, several players sued the club for failure to pay wages. Erbil's issues were exacerbated by disagreements between the Kurdish government and the Iraqi federal government, where the latter paused payments to the Kurdish region. Erbil, and other Kurdish clubs, were also not given access to funds released by the federal governments to the clubs taking part in the Iraqi stars League. In the 2022–23 season, Erbil reached the final of the Iraqi cup for the first time.

== Stadium ==
Erbil play their matches at the Franso Hariri Stadium. The stadium holds 25,000 spectators and was re-built in 1956. Following the assassination of Franso Heriri on 18 February 2001, the Kurdistan Regional Government renamed it in his memory. In July 2009, Franso Hariri Stadium hosted the first continental match on Iraqi soil since 2003. However, due to technical problems, FIFA abandoned the idea of having more national games being hosted in the stadium.

== Rivalries ==
Erbil SC's main rival is Duhok SC with whom they contest the South Kurdistan derby. Also, the rivalry between Erbil SC and Zakho SC is known as the "Kurdish derby". Within the Kurdish Premier League, they also have a derby against Peshmerga Hawler SC, which is another club situated inside Erbil.

== Honours ==
Type	Competition	Titles	Seasons
National	Iraq Stars League	4	2006–07, 2007–08, 2008–09, 2011–12
National	Iraqi Premier Division League (second tier)	1	1998–99
Regional	Kurdistan Premier League	3	2009–10, 2011–12, 2015–16

== Performance in AFC competitions ==
- AFC Champions League: 1 appearance

2008: Group stage

- AFC Cup: 6 appearances

2009: Quarter-finals
2011: Semi-finals
2012: Runners-up
2013: Round of 16
2014: Runners-up
2015: Group stage

== Individual honours ==
Iraq Stars League

The following players have won the Golden boot while playing for Erbil
- (Iraq) 2006–07 – Ahmed Salah Alwan 11 goals
- (Iraq) 2008–09 – Ahmed Salah Alwan 15 goals
- (Iraq) 2010–11 – Luay Salah 17 goals
- (Iraq) 2012–13 – Amjad Radhi 25 goals
- (Uzbekistan) 2025–26 – Sherzod Temirov 28 goals

== Recent history ==
Season	Pos.	Pl.	W	D	L	GS	GA	P	AFC CL	AFC Cup	Arab CL	Notes
2000–01	12	30	6	11	13	24	46	29				
2001–02	6	38	20	12	6	61	32	72				
2002–03	—	27	10	7	10	44	33	37				Abandoned due to war
2003–04	—	10	6	3	1	19	8					Abandoned due to war
2004–05	5	20	9	6	5	32	23					
2005–06	3	19	6	7	5	18	16					
2006–07	1	19	14	3	2	34	11				1st round	
2007–08	1	24	15	6	3	33	10		Group stage			
2008–09	1	27	20	5	2	55	17					
2009–10	4	42	29	6	7	79	22					
2010–11	2	27	17	6	4	54	21			Semi-finals		
2011–12	1	38	23	14	1	65	22	83		Final		
2012–13	2	34	21	7	6	67	34	70		Round of 16		
2013–14	2	21	12	6	3	29	15	42		Final		Ended prematurely
2014–15	11	18	5	10	3	21	17			Group stage		
2015–16	11	17	5	8	4	19	17					
2016–17	Withdrew	0	0	0	0	0	0	0				Relegated
2017–18	2 (Div. 1)											Promoted
2018–19	11	38	12	12	14	34	36	48				
2019–20	—	9	2	4	3	8	11					Abandoned due to COVID-19
2020–21	12	38	10	14	14	39	41	44				
2021–22	11	38	12	11	15	37	42	47				
2022–23	6	38	16	10	12	44	39	58				
2023–24	14	38	9	14	15	46	50	41				
2024–25	12	38	15	5	18	49	61	50				
2025–26	3	38	23	10	5	59	32	79				

- From 2004 to 2005, the competition changed from league system to various rounds including table and knockout rounds.
- From 2011 to 2012, the competition went back to the single league system.
- From 2014 to 2015, the competition returned to a system with various rounds.
- From 2016 to 2017, the competition went back to the single league system.

== Managerial history ==
Name	Nationality	Years
Yahya Alwan	(Iraq)	2004–05
Nadhim Shaker	(Iraq)	2005–07
Akram Salman	(Iraq)	2007–08
Thair Ahmed	(Iraq)	2008–10
Ayoub Odisho	(Iraq)	2010–11
Nizar Mahrous	(Syria)	2012–13
Rodion Gačanin	(Croatia)	2012–13
Ayoub Odisho	(Iraq)	2013–15
Ahmad Salah	(Iraq)	2015
Thair Ahmed	(Iraq)	2015–17
Ali Wahab	(Iraq)	2017–18
Emad Aoda	(Iraq)	25 August – 6 December 2018
Nadhum Shaker	(Iraq)	8 December – 26 April 2019
Akram Ahmad Salman	(Iraq)	28 April – 5 October 2019
Rodion Gačanin	(Croatia)	19 October 2019 – 10 February 2021
Luay Salah	(Iraq)	11 February – 15 May 2021
Taha Kader	(Iraq)	15 May – 16 October 2021
Tarek Jarraya	(Tunisia)	16 October 2021 – 11 December 2021
Nizar Mahrous	(Syria)	23 December 2021 - 22 December2022
Ghazi Fahad	(Iraq)	22 December 2022 – 6 February 2023
Abbas Obeid	(Iraq)	6 February 2023 – 20 May 2024
Samir Babo	(Iraq)	20 May 2024 – 5 August 2025
Basim Qasim	(Iraq)	6 August 2025 – present

== See also ==
- Iraqi clubs in the AFC Cup
- Iraqi clubs in the AFC Champions League
