= Karbala SC =

Iraqi football club

- Full name: Karbala Sports Club
- Founded: 1958; 68 years ago
- Ground: Karbala International Stadium
- Capacity: 30,000
- Chairman: Ahmed Haddam
- Manager: Qahtan Chathir
- League: Iraq Stars League
- 2025–26: Iraqi Premier Division League, 4th of 20 (promoted via play-offs)
Home colours	Away colours

Karbala Sports Club is an Iraqi professional football club based in Karbala that plays in the Iraq Stars League, the top tier of Iraqi football.

== SWAT incident ==
On June 23, 2013, after a match against Al-Quwa Al-Jawiya, seven football players of Karbala FC and their coach were beaten by the anti-terror police. They used sticks and batons against the coach and his players. Five of them were in critical condition, and on the 30th of June, Mohammed Al-Jaboury, coach of Karbala FC has died in hospital.

== Stadium ==
Karbala International Stadium is a purpose built football stadium being constructed in Karbala, Iraq. It was opened in 2016 in which it has the capacity to hold 30,000 people and become the new home of the club.

== Current squad ==
As of 15 August 2026

Note: Flags indicate national team as defined under FIFA eligibility rules; some limited exceptions apply. Players may hold more than one non-FIFA nationality.

No.	Pos.	Nation	Player
1	GK	IRQ	Ali Ibadi
2	DF	IRQ	Moamel Ali Hussein
4	DF	IRQ	Muntadher Sattar
7	MF	IRQ	Mueen Ahmed
8	MF	IRQ	Rasul Ahmed
9	FW	IRQ	Ali Kareem Hussein
10	FW	IRQ	Jaafar Obeis
11	MF	IRQ	Aws Mohammed
14	DF	CMR	Salomon Bindjeme
17	FW	IRQ	Mohammed Saad Saheb
19	MF	IRQ	Saif Eldin Dhaher
20	FW	IRQ	Hassan Ali Hussein
22	GK	IRQ	Ahmed Shaker

No.	Pos.	Nation	Player
24	MF	NGA	Dare Olatunji
25	DF	IRQ	Ali Khaled
27	MF	IRQ	Muntadher Rahim
30	GK	IRQ	Laith Maan
33	MF	ANG	Moisés Amor
32	DF	IRQ	Hassan Ashour
44	DF	NGA	Joshua Akpudje
66	DF	IRQ	Mohammed Al-Baqer
77	DF	IRQ	Ali Ahmed Alwan
88	MF	NGA	Iyayi Atiemwen
90	FW	NGA	Austin Amutu
99	FW	IRQ	Mohammed Salah
