= 2001–02 Al-Talaba SC season =

Al-Talaba
2001–02 season
- Manager: Thair Ahmed
- Stadium: Al Karkh Stadium; Al-Sinaa Stadium; Al Shorta Stadium; Al-Shaab Stadium
- Iraqi Elite League: 1st
- Iraq FA Cup: Winners
- Umm al-Ma'arik Championship: Runners-up
- Top goalscorer: League: Sahib Abbas (18); All: Younis Mahmoud (23)
Home colours	Away colours	Third colours

The 2001–02 season, covering the period from 22 September 2001 to 17 May 2002, was Al-Talaba Sport Club's 27th consecutive season in the Iraqi Elite League, top-flight of Iraqi football. Having finished in 4th place in the previous season, Al-Talaba competed in the Iraqi Elite League, the Iraq FA Cup and the Umm al-Ma'arik Championship.

Throughout their league season, Al-Talaba were consistent in their results having won 29 matches, drawn four and lost five from the total 38 matches and scored 89 goals. It was Al-Talaba's fifth league shield after nine years since their last league title in 1992–93. In the Iraq FA Cup, Al-Talaba reached the final after defeating the four teams that they faced to come up against Al-Shorta in the final where they won 1–0 after Qusay Hashim's 85th-minute goal, achieving their first double. In their third competition of the season, the Umm al-Ma'arik Championship which was played in February 2002, Al-Talaba reached the final for the fourth time in their history where they lost to Al-Shorta with Mahir Habib's single goal in the 112th minute of extra time. They ended their season achieving two titles and as the runners-up of the other one. They were also awarded the Baghdad Day Cup title for their 2–1 league win over Al-Zawra'a which was played on Baghdad Day (14 November).

== Players ==
=== Squad information ===
As of 17 May 2002

Note: Flags indicate national team as defined under FIFA eligibility rules; some limited exceptions apply. Players may hold more than one non-FIFA nationality.

No.	Pos.	Nation	Player
1	GK	IRQ	Jameel Mahmoud
2	DF	IRQ	Muayad Khalid
3	DF	IRQ	Uday Jassim
4	DF	IRQ	Sadiq Saadoun
5	DF	IRQ	Hisham Ali
6	DF	IRQ	Bassim Abbas
7	FW	IRQ	Ahmed Salah Alwan
8	MF	IRQ	Habib Jafar (captain)
9	FW	IRQ	Abdul-Ameer Hassan
10	FW	IRQ	Alaa Kadhim (vice-captain)
11	FW	IRQ	Sabah Jeayer
12	DF	IRQ	Haidar Abdul-Razzaq
13	DF	IRQ	Bassim Abdul-Hassan
14	MF	IRQ	Alaa Neruz Areej
15	MF	IRQ	Hassan Turki Attiya
16	MF	IRQ	Ahmed Hassan

No.	Pos.	Nation	Player
17	DF	IRQ	Arkan Najeeb
18	FW	IRQ	Ahmed Ibrahim
19	FW	IRQ	Sahib Abbas
20	MF	IRQ	Bahaa Kadhim
21	GK	IRQ	Saad Nasser
22	MF	IRQ	Fawzi Abdul-Sada
23	DF	IRQ	Ahmed Wali
25	FW	IRQ	Qusay Hashim
26	MF	IRQ	Mustafa Mahmoud
27	GK	IRQ	Akram Sabih
28	FW	IRQ	Younis Mahmoud
29	MF	IRQ	Talib Abdul-Latif
30	DF	IRQ	Hamza Hadi Muhsin
31	FW	IRQ	Muayad Joodi
33	MF	IRQ	Walid Ahmad

=== Players In ===
N	Pos	Player	Moving from	Type	Transfer window
14	MF	(Iraq) Alaa Neruz Areej	(Iraq) Al-Mina'a	Transfer	Summer
19	FW	(Iraq) Sahib Abbas Hassan	(Lebanon) Nejmeh	Transfer	Summer
25	FW	(Iraq) Qusay Hashim	(Yemen) Al-Shaab Ibb	Transfer	Summer
26	MF	(Iraq) Mustafa Mahmoud	(Iraq) Al-Jaish	Transfer	Summer
28	FW	(Iraq) Younis Mahmoud	(Iraq) Kirkuk	Transfer	Summer
22	MF	(Iraq) Fawzi Abdul-Sada	(Iraq) Al-Sinaa	Transfer	Winter

== Competitions ==
=== Overall record ===
Competition	First match	Last match	Record							
Competition	First match	Last match	G	W	D	L	GF	GA	GD	Win %
Iraqi Elite League	22 September 2001	17 May 2002	38	29	4	5	89	18	+71	76.32
Iraq FA Cup	22 October 2001	29 April 2002	9	7	2	0	15	5	+10	77.78
Umm al-Ma'arik Championship	2 February 2002	10 February 2002	5	3	1	1	6	3	+3	60.00
Total			52	39	7	6	110	26	+84	75.00

=== Iraqi Elite League ===
==== Group stage ====
Pos	Team	Pld	W	D	L	GF	GA	GD	Pts	Qualification or relegation
1	Al-Talaba (C)	38	29	4	5	89	18	+71	91	2002–03 AFC Champions League group stage (Note: Al-Zawraa had earned continental qualification by winning the previous season's league title, so with Iraq being given two slots for the AFC Champions League, Al-Zawraa were admitted to the qualifying round and Al-Talaba (who also won the Iraq FA Cup) entered the group stage.)
2	Al-Quwa Al-Jawiya	38	26	7	5	86	29	+57	85	
3	Al-Shorta	38	24	8	6	86	36	+50	80	
4	Al-Zawraa	38	22	8	8	70	30	+40	74	
5	Al-Najaf	38	22	8	8	59	25	+34	74	

Source: Ali Al-Sabti Archive
(C) Champions

==== Results by round ====
Round	1	2	3	4	5	6	7	8	9	10	11	12	13	14	15	16	17	18	19	20	21	22	23	24	25	26	27	28	29	30	31	32	33	34	35	36	37	38
Ground	H	H	A	H	A	H	H	H	A	H	H	A	H	H	H	A	H	H	A	A	A	A	H	H	H	A	A	A	H	H	H	A	H	H	H	H	H	H
Result	W	W	L	W	W	L	W	W	W	W	W	W	W	W	L	L	W	W	D	W	W	W	W	W	W	D	W	D	W	W	W	W	L	D	W	W	W	W

Source: Kooora.com
A = Away; H = Home; W = Win; D = Draw; L = Loss

===== Matches =====
22 September 2001 1	Al-Talaba	8–0	Kirkuk	Baghdad
	Kadhim 32', 35' (pen.); Mahomoud 40', 45', 50'; Jeayer 70', 80', 85'			Stadium: Al Karkh Stadium

9 October 2001 3	Al-Shorta	2–1	Al-Talaba	Baghdad
	Ridha 27', 70'		Hassan 90'	Stadium: Al-Shaab Stadium

12 October 2001 4	Al-Talaba	3–0	Diwaniya	Baghdad
	Turki 38', 76' (pen.), 88' (pen.)			Stadium: Al Shorta Stadium

19 October 2001 5	Al-Jaish	0–3	Al-Talaba	Baghdad
			Turki 22'; Neruz 45'; Mahmoud 85'	Stadium: Al-Sinaa Stadium

25 October 2001 6	Al-Talaba	1–2	Al-Difa'a Al-Jawi	Baghdad
	Mahmoud 59'		Mahmoud 72'; Khudhair 77'	Stadium: Al Karkh Stadium

2 November 2001 7	Al-Talaba	2–1	Erbil	Baghdad
	Abdul-Hassan 27'; Jeayer 65'		Nassir 42'	Stadium: Al-Shaab Stadium

9 November 2001 8	Al-Talaba	3–0	Al-Naft	Baghdad
	Wali 55'; Abbas 67'; Kadhim 74'			Stadium: Al Shorta Stadium

14 November 2001 9	Al-Zawra'a	1–2	Al-Talaba	Baghdad
	Mohammed 89'		Jeayer 21'; Mahmoud 39'	Stadium: Al-Zawraa Stadium
Note: This match also functioned as 2001 Baghdad Day Cup.

27 November 2001 2	Al-Talaba	2–1	Najaf	Baghdad
	Salah 48'; Kadhim 52'		Owaid 10'	Stadium: Al-Sinaa Stadium

4 December 2001 10	Al-Talaba	3–0	Samarra	Baghdad
	Turki 5'; Jeayer 12'; Ibrahim 78'			Stadium: Al-Shaab Stadium

7 December 2001 12	An Nasiriyah	0–1	Al-Talaba	Nasiriyah
			Jeayer 60'	Stadium: An Nasiriyah Stadium

31 December 2001 11	Al-Talaba	4–0	Al-Mina'a	Baghdad
	Abbas 49'; Jeayer 83'; Ibrahim 88'			Stadium: Al Shorta Stadium

3 January 2002 16	Al-Ramadi	1–0	Al-Talaba	Ar-Ramadi
	Hamad 78'			Stadium: Al Ramadi Stadium

7 January 2002 14	Al-Talaba	2–0	Al-Quwa Al-Jawiya	Baghdad
	Kadhim 85'; Salah 88'			Stadium: Al-Shaab Stadium

18 January 2002 18	Al-Talaba	1–0	Al-Karkh	Baghdad
	Abbas 64'			Stadium: Al-Shaab Stadium

25 January 2002 19	Duhok	0–0	Al-Talaba	Duhok
				Stadium: Duhok Stadium

13 February 2002 20	Kirkuk	0–2	Al-Talaba	Kirkuk
			Najib 7'; Abbas 84'	Stadium: Kirkuk Olympic Stadium

16 February 2002 21	Najaf	0–1	Al-Talaba	Najaf
			Kadhim 85'	Stadium: An-Najaf Stadium

19 February 2002 22	Al-Shorta	1–3	Al-Talaba	Baghdad
	Ahmad 44' (pen.)		Kadhim 14' (pen.); Abbas 75' (pen.), 90+3'	Stadium: Al Shorta Stadium

22 February 2002 23	Al-Talaba	4–1	Diwaniya	Baghdad
	Kadhim; Abbas; Joodi; Neruz 90'		Salih	Stadium: Al-Shaab Stadium

25 February 2002 13	Al-Talaba	2–0	Samawa	Baghdad
	Abbas 22' (pen.); Joodi 87'			Stadium: Al-Shaab Stadium

1 March 2002 24	Al-Talaba	4–0	Al-Difa'a Al-Jawi	Baghdad
	Abbas 35' (pen.); Najib 59'; Jafar 73'; Hadi 80'			Stadium: Al Shorta Stadium

4 March 2002 25	Al-Talaba	3–2	Al-Jaish	Baghdad
	Kadhim 14'; Salah 71'; Hadi 75'		Jahid 31'; Qasim 78'	Stadium: Al Shorta Stadium

8 March 2002 26	Erbil	0–0	Al-Talaba	Arbil
				Stadium: Franso Hariri Stadium

11 March 2002 15	Al-Talaba	0–1	Al-Kadhimiya	Baghdad
			Jihad 15' (pen.)	Stadium: Al-Sinaa Stadium

15 March 2002 27	Al-Naft	1–4	Al-Talaba	Baghdad
	Kadhim 90+2'		Mahmoud 5'; Abbas 36', 55', 58'	Stadium: Al-Sinaa Stadium

19 March 2002 28	Al-Mina'a	0–0	Al-Talaba	Basra
				Stadium: Al Minaa Stadium

22 March 2002 29	Al-Talaba	3–0	Samarra	Baghdad
	Jafar 43'; Abbas 53'; Neruz 74'			Stadium: Al Shorta Stadium

29 March 2002 30	Al-Talaba	2–0	Al-Zawra'a	Baghdad
	Jafar 44'; Kadhim 60'			Stadium: Al-Shaab Stadium

1 April 2002 31	Al-Talaba	6–1	An Nasiriyah	Baghdad
	Abbas 17', 76'; Hashim 50', 60', 72'; Abdul-Sada 80'		Hussein 90'	Stadium: Al-Shaab Stadium

4 April 2002 32	Samawa	0–1	Al-Talaba	Samawa
			Abbas 47'	Stadium: As Samawah Stadium

12 April 2002 33	Al-Talaba	1–3	Al-Quwa Al-Jawiya	Baghdad
	Ibrahim 90'		Dhahid 45', 64'; Jamal 89'	Stadium: Al-Shaab Stadium

19 April 2002 34	Al-Talaba	0–0	Al-Kadhimiya	Baghdad
				Stadium: Al-Sinaa Stadium

25 April 2002 35	Al-Talaba	3–0	Ramadi	Baghdad
	Mahmoud 11', 44'; Abbas 90'			Stadium: Al-Shaab Stadium

2 May 2002 36	Al-Talaba	1–0	Al-Sinaa	Baghdad
	Salah 17'			Stadium: Al Shorta Stadium

5 May 2002 17	Al-Talaba	5–0	Al-Sinaa	Baghdad
	Mahmoud 43', 69'; Jafar 50'; Turki 68', 88'			Stadium: Al-Shaab Stadium

10 May 2002 37	Al-Talaba	2–0	Al-Karkh	Baghdad
	Mahmoud 30', 46'			Stadium: Al-Shaab Stadium

17 May 2002 38	Al-Talaba	6–0	Duhok	Baghdad
	Kadhim 5', 80'; Abbas 68'; Turki 78'; Najeeb 89'; Jafar 90+1'			Stadium: Al-Shaab Stadium

Source: Rec.Sport.Soccer Statistics Foundation

=== Iraq FA Cup ===
==== Round 1 ====
October 2001 First leg	Basra	1–2	Al-Talaba	Basra
	Kadhim 73'		Mahmoud 60', 85'	Stadium: Basra Stadium

November 2001 Second leg	Al-Talaba	3–1	Basra	Baghdad
	Abbas; Mahmoud; Wali		Goal	Stadium: Al-Shaab Stadium

==== Round 2 ====
November 2001 First leg	Al-Talaba	3–1	Salahaddin	Baghdad
	Jeayer; Mahmoud; Kadhim		Goal	Stadium: Al-Shaab Stadium

November 2001 Second leg	Salahaddin	1–2	Al-Talaba	Tikrit
	Goal		Kadhim; Jeayer	Stadium: Tikrit Stadium

==== Quarterfinal ====
21 January 2002 First leg	Al-Difa'a Al-Jawi	0–0	Al-Talaba	Baghdad
				Stadium: Al Shorta Stadium

28 January 2002 Second leg	Al-Talaba	1–0	Al-Difa'a Al-Jawi	Baghdad
	Mahmoud 72'			Stadium: Al-Shaab Stadium

==== Semifinal ====
7 April 2002 First leg	Najaf	1–1	Al-Talaba	Najaf
	Hashim 43'		Hashim 87'	Stadium: An Najaf Stadium

15 April 2002 Second leg	Al-Talaba	2–0	Najaf	Baghdad
	Mahmoud 41'; Abbas 87'			Stadium: Al-Shaab Stadium

==== Final ====
29 April 2002 Final	Al-Talaba	1–0	Al-Shorta	Baghdad
	Hashim 85'			Stadium: Al-Shaab Stadium

Source: Rec.Sport.Soccer Statistics Foundation and Kooora Forums

=== Umm al-Ma'arik Championship ===
==== Group stage ====
Team	Pld	W	D	L	GF	GA	GD	Pts	Qualification
Al-Talaba	3	2	1	0	5	2	+3	7	Advanced to semifinals
Al-Quwa Al-Jawiya	3	1	1	1	4	3	+1	4	Advanced to semifinals
Al-Difaa Al-Jawi	3	1	0	2	5	7	−2	3	
Al-Najaf	3	1	0	2	2	4	−2	3	

Source: RSSSF.com
10 February 2002

Al-Shorta	1–0 (a.e.t.)	Al-Talaba
Habib 112'

Al-Shaab Stadium, Baghdad
Referee: Mahmoud Nouraddin

==== Matches ====
2 February 2002 1	Al-Talaba	4–2	Al-Difa'a Al-Jawi	Baghdad
	Mahmoud 50', 77', 90'; Abbas 75'		Khudhair 83'; Nafi' 87'	Stadium: Al-Shaab Stadium; Referee: Hazim Hussein

4 February 2002 2	Al-Talaba	0–0	Al-Quwa Al-Jawiya	Baghdad
				Stadium: Al-Shaab Stadium; Referee: Abdul-Hali Khudhair

6 February 2002 3	Al-Talaba	1–0	Najaf	Baghdad
	Mahmoud 22'			Stadium: Al-Shaab Stadium; Referee: Najim Abboud

==== Semifinal ====
8 February 2002 Semifinal	Al-Talaba	1–0	Al-Karkh	Baghdad
	Kadhim 70'			Stadium: Al-Shaab Stadium; Referee: Mohammed Sahib

==== Final ====
10 February 2002 Final	Al-Talaba	0–1 (a.e.t.)	Al-Shorta	Baghdad
			Habib 112'	Stadium: Al-Shaab Stadium; Referee: Mahmoud Nouraddin

Source: Rec.Sport.Soccer Statistics Foundation
