= 2011–12 Al-Shorta SC season =

Al Shorta
Iraqi Elite League season
- President: (Iraq) Raad Hammoudi (until 18 May) (Iraq) Ayad Bunyan (from 18 May onwards)
- Manager: (Iraq) Basim Qasim (until 30 July) (Iraq) Mohammad Tabra (Caretaker) (from 30 July onwards)
- Ground: Al Shorta Stadium
- Iraqi Elite League: 7th
- Top goalscorer: League: Amjad Kalaf (11); All: Amjad Kalaf (11)
Home colours	Away colours

In the 2011-12 season, Al Shorta competed in the 2011–12 Iraqi Elite League. Al Shorta were challenging for a top four finish throughout most of the season but a run of 6 losses in a row led them to 7th place in the league.

== Squad ==
Note: Flags indicate national team as defined under FIFA eligibility rules; some limited exceptions apply. Players may hold more than one non-FIFA nationality.

No.	Pos.	Nation	Player
1	GK	IRQ	Ali Husain (captain)
2	DF	IRQ	Ali Abd Ali
3	DF	IRQ	Dhirgham Ismail
4	DF	IRQ	Zeid Khalaf
5	FW	IRQ	Safwan Abdul-Ghani
6	DF	IRQ	Abbas Rahif
7	FW	IRQ	Ali Oudah
8	MF	IRQ	Emad Ghali
9	FW	IRQ	Muhaimen Salim
10	MF	IRQ	Jabir Shakir
11	MF	IRQ	Ali Khudhair
12	MF	IRQ	Emad Khalaf
13	GK	IRQ	Muhanned Jabbar
14	FW	IRQ	Amjad Kalaf
15	DF	IRQ	Waleed Bahar
16	MF	IRQ	Ali Yousif
17	FW	IRQ	Mousa Hashem

No.	Pos.	Nation	Player
19	MF	IRQ	Husain Abdullah
20	DF	IRQ	Fareed Majeed (vice-captain)
21	FW	IRQ	Emad Mohsin
22	FW	IRQ	Hussam Ibrahim
23	GK	IRQ	Mohammed Hameed
27	MF	IRQ	Mahdi Kamel
28	MF	IRQ	Haider Salim
30	MF	IRQ	Ali Hussein Fandi
31	MF	IRQ	Kadhum Dheiaa
32	MF	IRQ	Ali Rahim
33	FW	IRQ	Sherko Kareem
34	MF	IRQ	Nadim Karim
35	MF	IRQ	Ahmad Fadhel
—	MF	IRQ	Sanad Raad Saleem
—	MF	IRQ	Muntadher Abdulkareem
—	MF	IRQ	Muhammed Eskander

== Kit ==
Period	Home colours	Away colours	
November 2011 – January 2012	Adidas	Adidas	
February 2012 – May 2012	Nike	Peak	Peak
May 2012 – August 2012	Adidas	Peak	Peak

== Transfers ==
=== In ===
Date	Pos.	Name	From	Fee
August 2011	Manager	(Iraq) Basim Qasim	(Iraq) Zakho FC	-
August 2011	FW	(Iraq) Mousa Hashem	(Iraq) Zakho FC	-
September 2011	FW	(Iraq) Muhaimen Salim	(Iraq) Baghdad FC	-
September 2011	FW	(Iraq) Hussam Ibrahim	(Iraq) Al Minaa	-
September 2011	MF	(Iraq) Samer Saeed	(Iraq) Al Zawraa	-
September 2011	GK	(Iraq) Ali Mutashar	(Iraq) Al Talaba	-
September 2011	MF	(Iraq) Safwan Abdul-Ghani	(Iraq) Zakho FC	-
September 2011	DF	(Iraq) Muayad Khalid	(Iraq) Al Zawraa	-
September 2011	DF	(Iraq) Zeid Khalaf	(Iraq) Duhok FC	-
September 2011	DF	(Iraq) Abbas Rahif	(Iraq) Al Kahraba	-
September 2011	DF	(Iraq) Ali Abd Ali	(Iraq) Al Karkh	-
September 2011	MF	(Iraq) Ali Khudhair	(Iraq) Arbil FC	-
September 2011	FW	(Iraq) Alaa Shimal	(Iraq) Al Naft	-
September 2011	GK	(Iraq) Muhannad Jabbar	(Iraq) Baghdad FC	-
September 2011	GK	(Iraq) Mohammed Hameed	(Iraq) Al Kahraba	-
October 2011	MF	(Iraq) Ali Yousif	(Iraq) Dohuk FC	-
December 2011	FW	(Iraq) Sherko Kareem	(Iraq) Kirkuk FC	-
December 2011	MF	(Iraq) Emad Khalaf	(Iraq) Najaf FC	-
December 2011	MF	(Iraq) Kadhum Dheiaa	(Iraq) Al Talaba	-
March 2012	MF	(Iraq) Nadim Karim	(Iraq) Dohuk FC	-
March 2012	MF	(Iraq) Ali Rahim	(Iraq) Al Sinaa	-

=== Out ===
Date	Pos.	Name	To	Fee
August 2011	FW	(Iraq) Bashar Saad	(Iraq) Al Masafi	-
August 2011	GK	(Iraq) Hussein Shallal	(Iraq) Al Kahraba	-
August 2011	GK	(Iraq) Luay Khalil	(Iraq) Al-Hedood	-
August 2011	DF	(Iraq) Kassim Zidan	(Iraq) Zakho FC	-
August 2011	FW	(Iraq) Omar Kadhim	(Iraq) Al Etisalat	-
August 2011	MF	(Iraq) Wissam Kadhim	(Iraq) Al Sinaa	-
August 2011	MF	(Iraq) Mustafa Mohammed	(Iraq) Al Masafi	-
August 2011	MF	(Iraq) Ahmed Khalaf	(Iraq) Salahaddin FC	-
August 2011	DF	(Iraq) Ahmed Mohammed	(Iraq) Al Quwa Al Jawiya	-
August 2011	DF	(Iraq) Ali Jabbar	(Iraq) Al Naft	-
September 2011	MF	(Iraq) Ali Zoyed	(Iraq) Al Naft	-
September 2011	FW	(Iraq) Ahmed Hannon	(Iraq) Najaf FC	-
September 2011	DF	(Iraq) Ahmed Chasib	(Iraq) Al Zawraa	-
September 2011	MF	(Iraq) Samer Saeed	(Iraq) Najaf FC	-
October 2011	DF	(Iraq) Muayad Khalid	(Iraq) Al Zawraa	-
November 2011	MF	(Iraq) Haitham Kadhim Jassim	(Iraq) Najaf FC	-
November 2011	GK	(Iraq) Ali Mutashar	(Iraq) Al Sinaa	-
December 2011	FW	(Iraq) Hashim Ridha	(Iraq) Karbala FC	-
May 2012	FW	(Iraq) Alaa Shimal	(Iraq) Al Naft	-
July 2012	Manager	(Iraq) Basim Qasim	(Iraq) Sulaymaniya FC	-

== Competitions ==
=== Iraqi Elite League ===
==== Matches ====
3 November 2011 1	Al Sinaa	0–0	Al Shorta	Baghdad
12:00 GMT				Stadium: Al Sina'a Stadium

9 November 2011 2	Al Shorta	3–0	Al Naft	Baghdad
12:00 GMT	Zeid Khalaf 9', 41'; Abbas Rahif 82'			Stadium: Al Shorta Stadium

18 November 2011 3	Al Shorta	1–0	Al Masafi	Baghdad
11:30 GMT	Aqeel Saddam 25' (o.g.)			Stadium: Al Shorta Stadium

23 November 2011 4	Al Karkh	0–0	Al Shorta	Karkh
11:30 GMT				Stadium: Al Karkh Stadium

1 December 2011 5	Baghdad FC	0–0	Al Shorta	Baghdad
11:30 GMT				Stadium: Baghdad Stadium

5 December 2011 6	Al Shorta	1–0	Shirqat FC	Baghdad
11:30 GMT	Amjad Kalaf 10'			Stadium: Al Shorta Stadium

13 December 2011 7	Al Shorta	3–1	Al Kahraba	Baghdad
11:30 GMT	Safwan Abdul-Ghani 38'; Ali Oudah 85'; Husain Abdullah 90+4'		Mustafa Jawda 45'	Stadium: Al Shorta Stadium

21 December 2011 8	Arbil FC	0–0	Al Shorta	Arbil
11:30 GMT				Stadium: Franso Hariri Stadium

26 December 2011 9	Al Shorta	0–0	Al Quwa Al Jawiya	Baghdad
14:00 GMT				Stadium: Al Shaab Stadium

1 January 2012 10	Al Zawraa	2–1	Al Shorta	Baghdad
12:00 GMT	Ali Saad 20'; Hesham Mohammed 40'		Emad Ghali 90+10'	Stadium: Al Shaab Stadium

6 January 2012 11	Al Shorta	2–1	Karbala FC	Baghdad
11:30 GMT	Amjad Kalaf 45+1'; Zeid Khalaf 78'		Husain Farhoud 90+2'	Stadium: Al Sina'a Stadium

18 January 2012 12	Al Minaa	1–2	Al Shorta	Basra
11:30 GMT	Muhammed Shukan 80'		Ali Oudah 41', 60'	Stadium: Naft Al-Janoob Stadium

27 January 2012 13	Al Shorta	1–1	Al Taji FC	Baghdad
11:30 GMT	Zeid Khalaf 90+3'; Alaa Shimal (red card) 56'		Ali Ubaid 57' (pen.); Ali Salman (red card) 85'	Stadium: Al Sina'a Stadium

9 February 2012 14	Al Shorta	0–0	Kirkuk FC	Baghdad
11:30 GMT				Stadium: Al Shorta Stadium

14 February 2012 15	Dohuk FC	1–1	Al Shorta	Duhok
11:30 GMT	Khalid Musheer 54'		Amjad Kalaf 90+5' (pen.)	Stadium: Duhok Stadium

25 February 2012 16	Al Talaba	2–1	Al Shorta	Baghdad
13:30 GMT	Eihab Kadhum 54'; Thamer Fouad 65'; Mukhallad Ali (red card) 86'		Hussam Ibrahim 41'	Stadium: Al Shaab Stadium

3 March 2012 17	Al Shorta	2–0	Zakho FC	Baghdad
11:30 GMT	Ali Oudah 17'; Dhirgham Ismail 67'			Stadium: Al Shorta Stadium

8 March 2012 18	Najaf FC	0–0	Al Shorta	Najaf
11:30 GMT				Stadium: An Najaf Stadium

19 March 2012 19	Al-Hedood	0–2	Al Shorta	Baghdad
11:30 GMT			Hussam Ibrahim 21'; Dhirgham Ismail 90+2'	Stadium: Al Shorta Stadium

5 April 2012 20	Al Shorta	2–1	Al Sinaa	Baghdad
12:00 GMT	Zeid Khalaf 31'; Amjad Kalaf 72'		Ayad Shaalan 82'	Stadium: Al Shorta Stadium

10 April 2012 21	Al Naft	1–2	Al Shorta	Baghdad
12:00 GMT	Samer Saeed 18'; Ahmed Abdulmajeed (red card) 80'		Amjad Kalaf 13'; Muhaimen Salim 45'	Stadium: Al Naft Stadium

20 April 2012 22	Al Masafi	0–0	Al Shorta	Baghdad
12:30 GMT				Stadium: Al-Masafi Stadium

25 April 2012 23	Al Shorta	1–0	Al Karkh	Baghdad
12:30 GMT	Ahmad Fadhel 47'			Stadium: Al Shorta Stadium

1 May 2012 24	Al Shorta	0–1	Baghdad FC	Baghdad
13:30 GMT			Qusai Munir 56'	Stadium: Al Shorta Stadium

8 May 2012 25	Shirqat FC	0–2	Al Shorta	Kirkuk
13:00 GMT			Ali Rahim 75'; Zeid Khalaf 89' (pen.)	Stadium: Al Shirqat Stadium

14 May 2012 26	Al Kahraba	2–1	Al Shorta	Baghdad
13:30 GMT	Mustafa Jawda 3'; Abbas Abdulrazak 27'		Hussam Ibrahim 89'

9 June 2012 27	Al Shorta	3–2	Al Zawraa	Baghdad
14:00 GMT	Amjad Kalaf (penalty missed) 38', 38', 66'; Zeid Khalaf 83'		Haidar Sabah 15', 76' (pen.)	Stadium: Al Shaab Stadium

19 June 2012 28	Karbala FC	2–2	Al Shorta	Karbalaa
14:00 GMT	Maitham Hamza 61'; Husain Farhoud 79'		Muhaimen Salim 42'; Amjad Kalaf 43'	Stadium: Karbala Stadium

24 June 2012 29	Al Shorta	3–0	Al Minaa	Baghdad
14:00 GMT	Nadim Karim (red card) 70'; Amjad Kalaf 72' (pen.), 90'; Sherko Kareem 74'		Karrar Ebraheem (red card) 71'	Stadium: Al Shorta Stadium

30 June 2012 30	Al Taji FC	1–0	Al Shorta	Baghdad
14:00 GMT	Majid Hameed 59'			Stadium: Al Taji Stadium

5 July 2012 31	Al Shorta	1–0	Al-Hedood	Baghdad
14:00 GMT	Husain Abdullah 35'			Stadium: Al Shorta Stadium

15 July 2012 32	Kirkuk FC	4–1	Al Shorta	Kirkuk
14:00 GMT	Deiar Rahman 41'; Mohammed Kalaf 48'; Miran Karim 76'; Sattar Yaseen 90+1'		Ali Oudah 81'	Stadium: Kirkuk Olympic Stadium

20 July 2012 33	Al Shorta	0–1	Dohuk FC	Baghdad
14:00 GMT			Mohanad Abdul-Raheem 7'; Salih Sadeer (red card) 66'	Stadium: Al Shorta Stadium

28 July 2012 34	Al Shorta	1–5	Arbil FC	Baghdad
14:00 GMT	Ahmad Fadhel 90+3'		Mustafa Ahmad 10'; Amjad Radhi 29', 89'; Nabeel Sabah 64'; Abdelrazaq Al Hussain 73'	Stadium: Al Shorta Stadium

1 August 2012 35	Al Shorta	1–2	Al Talaba	Baghdad
18:30 GMT	Hussam Ibrahim 78'		Younis Shakour 25'; Abbas Rehema 44'	Stadium: Al Shaab Stadium

5 August 2012 36	Al Quwa Al Jawiya	2–0	Al Shorta	Baghdad
18:30 GMT	Hammadi Ahmed 36', 64'			Stadium: Al Shaab Stadium

10 August 2012 37	Zakho FC	3–2	Al Shorta	Zakho
14:00 GMT	Mohammed Mahmood 6'; Nijarvan Shukri 36'; Feras Esmaeel 40'		Amjad Kalaf 81'; Muhaimen Salim 87'	Stadium: Zakho Stadium

15 August 2012 38	Al Shorta	3–1	Najaf FC	Baghdad
14:00 GMT	Ali Oudah 72', 84'; Hussam Ibrahim 78'		Saif Jubair 90+4' (pen.)	Stadium: Al Shorta Stadium

==== Classification ====
Pos	Team	Pld	W	D	L	GF	GA	GD	Pts
5	Zakho	38	15	16	7	53	36	+17	61
6	Baghdad	38	16	12	10	41	26	+15	60
7	Al-Shorta	38	16	11	11	45	37	+8	59
8	Al-Zawraa	38	15	11	12	54	35	+19	56
9	Al-Najaf	38	12	16	10	40	41	−1	52

Source: Goalzz

== Basketball ==
Al Shorta finished 4th in the 2012 Arab Club Basketball Championship.
