= 2013–14 Duhok SC season =

Duhok SC
2013–14 season
- Chairman: Saeed Ahmed
- Manager: Fajr Ibrahim
- Ground: Duhok Stadium
Home colours	Away colours

The 2013-14 season is Duhok SC 14th consecutive season in the Iraqi Premier League.

== Match Results ==
=== Iraqi Premier League ===
29 October 2013 1	Al-Masafi FC	0 – 0	Duhok SC	Al-Masafi Stadium

3 November 2013 2	Duhok SC	2 – 1	Al Zawraa	Duhok
				Stadium: Duhok Stadium

8 November 2013 3	Naft Maysan	1 – 1	Duhok SC	Naft Maysan stadium

23 November 2013 4	Duhok SC	1 – 1	Al-Talaba	Duhok Stadium

28 November 2013 5	Al-Shorta SC (Baghdad)	5 – 0	Duhok SC	Al-Shorta Stadium

6 December 2013 6	Duhok SC	2 – 0	Najaf FC	Duhok
				Stadium: Duhok Stadium

11 December 2013 7	Duhok SC	2 – 1	Al-Karkh	AL-Karkh Stadium

11 December 2013 8	Al-Mina'a SC	2 – 2	Duhok SC	Al-Mina'a SC Stadium

29 December 2013 9	Duhok SC	0 – 0	Zakho FC	Duhok
				Stadium: Duhok Stadium

2 February 2014 10	Duhok SC	0 – 1	Al-Quwa Al-Jawiya	Baghdad
				Stadium: Al-Quwa Al-Jawiya Stadium

7 February 2014 11	Duhok SC	2 – 0	Karbalaa FC	Duhok
				Stadium: Duhok Stadium

14 February 2014 12	Erbil SC	1 – 0	Duhok SC	Franso Hariri Stadium

== Current squad ==
Note: Flags indicate national team as defined under FIFA eligibility rules; some limited exceptions apply. Players may hold more than one non-FIFA nationality.

No.	Pos.	Nation	Player
1	MF	IRQ	Osama Ali
2	DF	ARG	Mauricio Mazzetti
3	DF	IRQ	Ali Abdul-Jabbar
4	DF	IRQ	Abbas Abid
5	MF	BFA	Mohamed Koffi
7	MF	IRQ	Ali Fendi
8	FW	IRQ	Mohannad Abdul-Raheem
9	FW	CMR	Matthew Mbuta
10	MF	IRQ	Amad Ismail
11	MF	IRQ	Azad Ahmed (captain)
13	MF	IRQ	Amjad Waleed
14	FW	COL	Víctor Guazá
15	MF	IRQ	Abbas Hussein Rahima
17	FW	IRQ	Alaa Abdul-Zahra
19	MF	NED	Ciawar Khandan

No.	Pos.	Nation	Player
20	GK	IRQ	Haidar Raad
21	GK	IRQ	Uday Taleb (vice-captain)
22	FW	IRQ	Ali Qasim
23	DF	IRQ	Hussein Falah
24	DF	MLI	Boubacar Koné
25	FW	IRQ	Mohammed Abdul-Jabar
27	MF	IRQ	Bayar Abubakir
29	FW	IRQ	Ayman Hussein
—	GK	IRQ	Ammar Ali
—	DF	IRQ	Ous Ibrahim
—	MF	IRQ	Kinan Adel
—	MF	IRQ	Ahmed Abdul-Ameer

== Transfers ==
=== In ===
Date	Pos.	Name	From
September 2013	FW	(Cameroon) Matthew Mbuta	(Thailand) Army United F.C.
September 2013	MF	(Netherlands) Ciawar Khandan	(Netherlands) FC Oss
September 2013	MF	(Iraq) Ous Ibrahim	(Iraq) Al-Zawraa
October 2013	DF	(Iraq) Abbas Rhaima	(Iraq) Al-Talaba
October 2013	DF	(Iraq) Ali Jabbar	(Iraq) Al-Quwa Al-Jawiya
October 2013	DF	(Iraq) Ali Fendi	(Iraq) Sulaymaniya FC
October 2013	DF	(South Korea) Kim Kwang-min	(Japan) Fukushima United FC

=== OUT ===
Pos.	Name	TO
FW	(Iraq) Khalid Mushir	(Iraq) Zakho FC
MF	(Iraq) Salih Sadir	(Iraq) Zakho FC
MF	(Iraq) Jassim Muhammad Haji	(Iraq) Zakho FC
FW	(Iraq) Jassim suliman	(Iraq) Zeravani SC
DF	(Iraq) Hassan Zaboon	(Iraq) Zakho FC
DF	(Iraq) Ali Bahjat	(Iraq) Al-Shorta SC (Baghdad)
MF	(Syria) Burhan Sahyouni	(Iraq) Erbil SC
MF	(Iraq) Saif Salman	(Iraq) Erbil SC
MF	(Iraq) wissam Zaki	(Iraq) Al Naft

=== Goal scorers ===
Position	Nation	Number	Name	Total
FW	(Iraq)	17	Alaa Abdul-Zahra	3
FW	(Cameroon)	9	Matthew Mbuta	3
FW	(Iraq)	8	Mohannad Abdul-Raheem	2
FW	(Iraq)	22	Ali Qasim Mshari	1
MF	(Iraq)	1	Osama Ali	1
MF	(Mali)	24	Boubacar Koné	1
			Totals	12
