= 2014–15 Duhok SC season =

Duhok SC
2014–15 season
- Chairman: Saeed Ahmed
- Ground: Duhok Stadium
Home colours	Away colours

The 2014-2015 season was Duhok SC's 15th consecutive season in the Iraqi Premier League.

== Match results ==
=== Iraqi Premier League ===
1 October 2014 1	Duhok SC	2 – 1	Al-Talaba	Duhok Stadium

14 October 2014 2	Sulaymaniya	0 – 1	Duhok SC	sulaimani
				Stadium: Sulaimaniya Stadium

19 October 2014 3	Duhok SC	1 – 1	Amanat Baghdad	Duhok stadium

27 October 2014 4	Duhok SC	1 – 0	Al-Hedood	Duhok Stadium

== Current squad ==
Note: Flags indicate national team as defined under FIFA eligibility rules; some limited exceptions apply. Players may hold more than one non-FIFA nationality.

No.	Pos.	Nation	Player
1	MF	(Iraq) IRQ	Osama Ali
2	DF	(Argentina) ARG	Mauricio Mazzetti
3	DF	(Iraq) IRQ	Ali Abdul-Jabbar
4	DF	(Iraq) IRQ	Abbas Abid
5	MF	(Burkina Faso) BFA	Mohamed Koffi
7	MF	(Iraq) IRQ	Ali Fendi
8	FW	(Iraq) IRQ	Mohannad Abdul-Raheem
9	FW	(Cameroon) CMR	Matthew Mbuta
10	MF	(Iraq) IRQ	Amad Ismail
11	MF	(Iraq) IRQ	Azad Ahmed (captain)
13	MF	(Iraq) IRQ	Amjad Waleed
14	FW	(Colombia) COL	Víctor Guazá
15	MF	(Iraq) IRQ	Abbas Hussein Rahima
17	FW	(Iraq) IRQ	Alaa Abdul-Zahra
19	MF	(Netherlands) NED	Ciawar Khandan

No.	Pos.	Nation	Player
20	GK	(Iraq) IRQ	Haidar Raad
21	GK	(Iraq) IRQ	Uday Taleb (vice-captain)
22	FW	(Iraq) IRQ	Ali Qasim
23	DF	(Iraq) IRQ	Hussein Falah
24	DF	(Mali) MLI	Boubacar Koné
25	FW	(Iraq) IRQ	Mohammed Abdul-Jabar
27	MF	(Iraq) IRQ	Bayar Abubakir
29	FW	(Iraq) IRQ	Ayman Hussein
—	GK	(Iraq) IRQ	Ammar Ali
—	DF	(Iraq) IRQ	Ous Ibrahim
—	MF	(Iraq) IRQ	Kinan Adel
—	MF	(Iraq) IRQ	Ahmed Abdul-Ameer

=== Goal scorers ===
Position	Nation	Number	Name	Total
FW	(Iraq)	7	salih sadir	3
			Totals	12
