= 2008–09 Iraqi First Division League =

Iraqi First Division League
- Season: 2008–09
- Promoted: Masafi Al-Wasat; Al-Hasanain; Al-Shirqat; Al-Diwaniya; Naft Maysan; Al-Karkh; Zakho; Masafi Al-Junoob; Al-Hindiya
- All statistics correct as of 11 October 2015.

The 2008–09 Iraqi First Division League.

== Format and teams ==
=== Final qualification round ===

On December 4, 2009, the Iraq Football Federation met and decided that the final qualifying round will be played on one stage. Six clubs will play in Baghdad for the period from December 8 to 15, with five rounds, with three matches each day, with a break for the next day. Two of these teams will qualify for the 2009–10 Iraqi Premier League next season, joined by the six teams that already secured promotion in the previous round.

The matches are to be played on five stadiums: Al-Shorta Stadium, Al-Zawraa Stadium, Al-Quwa Al-Jawiya Stadium, Al Karkh Stadium and Al Naft Stadium.

==== Number of teams by Iraqi Governorates ====
| Governorate | Teams | Name of Teams |
Center
| Baghdad | 2 | Al-Siyaha and Al-Karkh |
| Al-Anbar | 1 | Al-Jolan |
North
| Dohuk | 1 | Zakho |
Middle Euphrates
| Karbala | 1 | Al-Hindiya |
South
| Basra | 1 | Masafi Al-Janoob |

== Final qualification round ==
The final qualification round will be one group, each team plays five game with other teams. The top two teams from group were to qualify for the 2009–10 Iraqi Premier League next season, but eventually the top four all qualified due to the withdrawal of Sulaymaniya and Sirwan from the Iraqi Premier League.

| Pos | Team | Pld | W | D | L | GF | GA | GD | Pts | Qualification |
|---|---|---|---|---|---|---|---|---|---|---|
| 1 | Al-Karkh (P) | 5 | 4 | 1 | 0 | 7 | 2 | +5 | 13 | Promotion to the Iraqi Premier League |
| 2 | Zakho (P) | 5 | 2 | 3 | 0 | 11 | 5 | +6 | 9 | Promotion to the Iraqi Premier League |
| 3 | Masafi Al-Janoob (P) | 5 | 2 | 2 | 1 | 8 | 7 | +1 | 8 | Promotion to the Iraqi Premier League |
| 4 | Al-Hindiya (P) | 5 | 1 | 3 | 1 | 11 | 8 | +3 | 6 | Promotion to the Iraqi Premier League |
| 5 | Al-Jolan | 5 | 1 | 0 | 4 | 9 | 17 | −8 | 3 | |
| 6 | Al-Siyaha | 5 | 0 | 1 | 4 | 6 | 13 | −7 | 1 | |

Updated to match(es) played on 14 December 2009. Source: kooora.com
Rules for classification: 1) points; 2) goal difference; 3) number of goals scored.
(P) Promoted

== Season statistics ==
=== Top scorers ===
==== Final qualification round ====
As of matches played on 15 December 2009

| Rank | Player | Club | Goals |
|---|---|---|---|
| 1 | (Iraq) Mohannad Abdul-Rahman | Al-Karkh | 4 |
| 1 | (Iraq) Hassan Farhood | Al-Hindiya | 4 |
| 1 | (Iraq) Broosh Jader | Zakho | 4 |
| 1 | (Iraq) Mustafa Basil | Zakho | 4 |
| 2 | (Iraq) Anmar Hussein | Al-Jolan | 3 |
| 2 | (Iraq) Hussam-Eddin Mohammed | Al-Jolan | 3 |
| 2 | (Iraq) Qusay Jbayer | Al-Jolan | 3 |
| 3 | (Iraq) Salam Ibrahim | Masafi Al-Janoob | 2 |
| 3 | (Iraq) Ammar Radhi | Al-Siyaha | 2 |
| 3 | (Iraq) Abbas Mohammed | Al-Siyaha | 2 |

== Others ==
- 2008–09 Iraqi Premier League
- 2011–12 Iraqi First Division League
