= 2009–10 Iraqi Premier League =

Iraqi Premier League
- Season: 2009–10
- Champions: Duhok (1st title)
- Relegated: Al-Kufa; Kirkuk; Al-Hudood; Al-Shirqat; Pires; Salahaddin; Al-Samawa; Al-Etisalat; Masafi Al-Junoob; Maysan; Sulaymaniya
- AFC Cup: Duhok; Al-Talaba; Erbil (invited)
- Top goalscorer: Amjad Radhi (31 goals)
- Biggest home win: Pires 7–0 Al-Hindiya (16 January 2010)
- Biggest away win: Al-Shirqat 0–4 Al-Quwa Al-Jawiya (7 April 2010); Masafi Al-Junoob 0–4 Duhok (4 May 2010)
- Highest scoring: Al-Diwaniya 3–5 Al-Shorta (8 April 2010); Masafi Al-Junoob 3–5 Al-Hindiya (15 May 2010); Al-Etisalat 5–3 Maysan (3 July 2010)

The 2009–10 Iraqi Premier League (known as the Zain Iraq League for sponsorship reasons) was the 36th edition of the competition. It was initially set to start in October 2009, but was later rescheduled for December as a 36-team league. The season saw Duhok crowned as champions for the first time.

== Name changes ==
- Al-Amana renamed to Baghdad.
- Al-Etisalat wal-Bareed renamed to Al-Etisalat.

== Group stage ==
=== North Group ===
Pos	Team	Pld	W	D	L	GF	GA	GD	Pts	Qualification or relegation
1	Erbil	33	25	5	3	67	14	+53	80	Qualified to Elite Stage
2	Al-Quwa Al-Jawiya	33	22	7	4	60	19	+41	73	Qualified to Elite Stage
3	Duhok	33	19	7	7	55	23	+32	64	Qualified to Elite Stage
4	Al-Zawraa	33	19	6	8	39	23	+16	63	Qualified to Elite Stage
5	Baghdad	33	15	11	7	42	25	+17	56	Qualified to Elite Stage
6	Al-Kahrabaa	33	13	14	6	38	25	+13	53	Qualified to Elite Stage
7	Masafi Al-Wasat	33	12	12	9	40	38	+2	48	
8	Zakho	33	12	9	12	33	31	+2	45	
9	Al-Ramadi	33	9	13	11	31	33	−2	40	
10	Al-Mosul	33	9	11	13	24	32	−8	38	
11	Al-Hindiya	33	7	13	13	33	49	−16	34	
12	Diyala	33	8	8	17	27	49	−22	32	
13	Samarra	33	6	13	14	24	37	−13	31	
14	Kirkuk	33	7	8	18	37	56	−19	29	Relegated to the Iraqi First Division League
15	Al-Shirqat	33	5	13	15	20	45	−25	28	Relegated to the Iraqi First Division League
16	Pires (Note: Pires withdrew from the league after playing half of their group stage games. Their results were not annulled.)	17	7	5	5	22	13	+9	26	Relegated to the Iraqi First Division League
17	Salahaddin	33	4	13	16	27	51	−24	25	Relegated to the Iraqi First Division League
18	Masafi Al-Junoob	33	2	8	23	20	76	−56	14	Relegated to the Iraqi First Division League

Source: Goalzz
Rules for classification: 1) points; 2) goal difference; 3) number of goals scored.
Notes:

Note: Sulaymaniya withdrew from the league and were relegated.

==== Results ====
Home \ Away	HIN	KAH	MSL	QWJ	RAM	SHQ	ZWR	BGD	DIY	DUH	ERB	KIR	MSJ	MAS	PRS	SAL	SMR	ZAK
Al-Hindiya		0–2	0–0	1–1	2–2	3–0	0–1	0–0	3–0	1–1	0–2	1–1	2–2	1–2		3–2	0–2	1–1
Al-Kahrabaa	3–1		0–0	1–4	1–0	1–0	0–1	1–1	2–2	1–1	0–0	1–1	5–0	2–0	2–1	0–0	0–0	0–0
Al-Mosul	0–1	1–0		0–1	0–0	2–0	0–1	2–1	0–3	0–0	1–0	1–0	3–0 (Note: The Al-Mosul–Masafi Al-Junoob match was awarded as a 3–0 win to Al-Mosul, as Masafi Al-Junoob did not turn up for the game.)	1–1	1–1	3–0	0–0	1–2
Al-Quwa Al-Jawiya	2–1	2–2	3–0 (Note: The Al-Quwa Al-Jawiya–Al-Mosul match was awarded as a 3–0 win to Al-Quwa Al-Jawiya after referee Ali Sabah ended the match when he was attacked for awarding a penalty to Al-Quwa Al-Jawiya near the end of the game; the score was 2–1 to Al-Quwa Al-Jawiya at the time.)		1–1	3–1	1–0	2–1	5–0	1–0	0–1	3–0 (Note: The Al-Quwa Al-Jawiya–Kirkuk match was awarded as a 3–0 win to Al-Quwa Al-Jawiya, as Kirkuk did not turn up for the game.)	4–1	0–0	0–0	1–0	1–0	3–0
Al-Ramadi	0–1	0–2	1–1	1–1		3–0	0–0	1–0	2–1	0–2	1–4	1–2	0–1	1–1		1–0	1–0	4–1
Al-Shirqat	0–0	0–0	0–0	0–4	0–0		1–4	1–1	1–0	0–0	1–4	2–2	3–0 (Note: The Al-Shirqat–Masafi Al-Junoob match was awarded as a 3–0 win to Al-Shirqat, as Masafi Al-Junoob did not turn up for the game.)	0–0		3–1	1–1	0–0
Al-Zawraa	1–0	0–0	1–0	0–3	0–0	0–0		2–1	0–3 (Note: Samarra, Salahaddin and Diyala were awarded 3–0 wins in round 13 because their respective opponents Masafi Al-Junoob, Al-Mosul and Al-Zawraa withdrew in protest at the reinstatement of the IFA board headed by Hussein Saeed.)	1–0	2–1	4–0	3–1	0–0	2–0	2–1	5–0	1–1
Baghdad	1–1	0–0	1–0	1–1	1–1	3–0	1–0		1–0	4–2	2–2	1–0	1–0	2–0		1–1	3–0	1–1
Diyala	1–0	1–2	1–1	0–1	0–0	1–0	1–0	1–4		0–1	0–3	0–2	1–1	0–2	1–1	0–0	0–0	1–1
Duhok	5–0	2–1	2–0	2–1	2–1	2–0	3–0 (Note: Zakho and Duhok were awarded 3–0 wins in round 12 because their respective opponents Al-Mosul and Al-Zawraa withdrew in protest at the reinstatement of the IFA board headed by Hussein Saeed.)	0–1	4–1		2–2	3–2	3–0	3–0		3–0 (Note: The Duhok–Salahaddin match was awarded as a 3–0 win to Duhok, as Salahaddin did not turn up for the game.)	1–0	2–0
Erbil	3–0	3–1	1–0	0–1	1–0	2–1	3–0 (Note: The Erbil–Al-Zawraa match was awarded as a 3–0 win to Erbil due to Al-Zawraa's players leaving the field after 17 minutes due to crowd trouble.)	2–1	5–0	1–0		2–0	6–0	2–0	1–0	3–0 (Note: The Erbil–Salahaddin match was awarded as a 3–0 win to Erbil, as Salahaddin did not turn up for the game.)	1–0	4–0
Kirkuk	0–2	0–2	0–2	0–1	2–1	1–2	1–3	1–0	0–1	2–3	1–1		2–2	2–3	1–1	2–2	3–1	2–1
Masafi Al-Junoob	3–5	0–1	1–2	1–0	1–4	0–0	0–1	0–2	1–3	0–4	0–3	1–3		0–0	0–2	2–2	0–3 (Note: The Masafi Al-Junoob–Samarra match was awarded as a 3–0 win to Samarra due to Masafi Al-Junoob fielding an ineligible player.)	1–2
Masafi Al-Wasat	1–0	3–2	3–1	3–4	3–0	2–3	0–1	0–0	2–1	1–0	0–0	4–3	1–1			0–0	2–1	1–3
Pires (Note: Pires withdrew from the league after playing half of their group stage games. Their results were not annulled.)	7–0				1–1	2–0		1–0		0–1				1–0		2–1	2–1	
Salahaddin	1–1	1–1	3–0	0–2	1–2	1–0	0–2	1–2	0–3	0–0	0–2	2–1	0–0	2–2			3–3	1–0
Samarra	2–2	0–1	1–1	0–3	0–0	0–0	1–0	1–2	1–0	1–0	0–1	0–0	3–0	1–1		1–1		0–0
Zakho	0–0	0–1	3–0	1–0	0–1	2–0	0–1	0–1	3–0 (Note: The Zakho–Diyala match was awarded as a 3–0 win to Zakho, as Diyala did not turn up for the game.)	1–1	0–1	2–0	2–0	0–2	1–0	3–0	2–0	

Source: Goalzz
Legend: Blue = home team win; Yellow = draw; Red = away team win.

=== South Group ===
Pos	Team	Pld	W	D	L	GF	GA	GD	Pts	Qualification or relegation
1	Al-Talaba	34	19	11	4	46	19	+27	68	Qualified to Elite Stage
2	Al-Najaf	34	18	12	4	49	20	+29	66	Qualified to Elite Stage
3	Al-Sinaa	34	19	9	6	52	32	+20	66	Qualified to Elite Stage
4	Karbala	34	17	13	4	40	18	+22	64	Qualified to Elite Stage
5	Al-Shorta	34	17	11	6	49	33	+16	62	Qualified to Elite Stage
6	Naft Al-Junoob	34	17	10	7	40	22	+18	61	Qualified to Elite Stage
7	Al-Minaa	34	16	11	7	36	23	+13	59	
8	Al-Naft	34	14	6	14	39	34	+5	48	
9	Naft Maysan	34	12	11	11	44	37	+7	47	
10	Al-Diwaniya	34	12	7	15	37	44	−7	43	
11	Al-Karkh	34	9	14	11	31	35	−4	41	
12	Al-Nasiriya	34	7	17	10	34	39	−5	38	
13	Al-Hasanain	34	9	11	14	32	46	−14	38	
14	Al-Kufa	34	8	10	16	32	41	−9	34	Relegated to the Iraqi First Division League
15	Al-Hudood	34	6	14	14	19	39	−20	32	Relegated to the Iraqi First Division League
16	Al-Samawa	34	6	5	23	30	59	−29	23	Relegated to the Iraqi First Division League
17	Al-Etisalat	34	4	8	22	23	51	−28	20	Relegated to the Iraqi First Division League
18	Maysan	34	2	8	24	17	58	−41	14	Relegated to the Iraqi First Division League

Source: Goalzz
Rules for classification: 1) points; 2) goal difference; 3) number of goals scored.

==== Results ====
Home \ Away	DIW	ETI	HAS	HUD	KAR	KUF	MIN	NFT	NJF	NAS	SMA	SHR	SIN	TLB	KRB	MSN	NFJ	NFM
Al-Diwaniya		1–3	2–1	1–1	3–1	3–2	2–1	0–1	1–1	1–0	3–0 (Note: The Al-Diwaniya–Al-Samawa match was awarded as a 3–0 win to Al-Diwaniya after Al-Samawa's players left the field during the match.)	3–5	0–2	1–2	0–0	2–1	1–1	0–1
Al-Etisalat	0–0		0–1	0–0	0–1	3–0	0–3	1–0	0–1	1–1	2–2	1–2	1–2	0–1	1–3	5–3	0–2	0–1
Al-Hasanain	1–1	1–0		1–1	1–0	2–2	1–0	0–0	0–0	0–0	1–2	0–1	1–1	0–1	1–0	1–0	1–1	2–3
Al-Hudood	1–2	1–0	2–2		0–1	1–3	0–0	0–1	0–0	1–0	2–1	0–0	0–3 (Note: Al-Kufa and Al-Sinaa were awarded 3–0 wins in round 13 because their respective opponents Al-Minaa and Al-Hudood withdrew in protest at the reinstatement of the IFA board headed by Hussein Saeed.)	0–0	0–1	1–0	0–0	1–1
Al-Karkh	0–1	1–1	4–1	0–1		1–0	0–0	0–0	2–2	1–1	2–0	2–2	0–2	1–1	0–0	2–1	2–0	2–1
Al-Kufa	3–0 (Note: Al-Kufa, Maysan, Naft Maysan, Al-Shorta, Al-Sinaa, Al-Naft and Karbala were awarded 3–0 wins in round 12 because their respective opponents Al-Diwaniya, Al-Karkh, Al-Hudood, Al-Samawa, Al-Minaa, Al-Talaba and Al-Najaf withdrew in protest at the reinstatement of the IFA board headed by Hussein Saeed.)	1–0	1–2	0–0	0–0		1–1	2–1	0–2	2–2	0–1	1–1	2–2	1–0	0–1	0–0	2–1	1–0
Al-Minaa	1–0	1–0	2–0	3–1	2–1	0–3		1–0	1–1	0–0	2–1	2–0	4–1	1–0	0–0	1–0	0–0	1–0
Al-Naft	3–1	1–1	3–0	3–0	0–0	2–0	0–1		0–0	2–1	1–0	1–3	1–2	0–2	1–3	2–0	0–1	2–1
Al-Najaf	2–0	3–1	1–0	4–0	1–1	2–0	2–0	0–0		2–1	3–1	2–0	1–1	1–1	0–3	1–0	1–0	1–1
Al-Nasiriya	1–1	1–1	1–3	0–0	2–2	2–1	2–1	3–1	1–0		2–1	0–1	1–1	0–0	1–1	1–0	1–1	2–4
Al-Samawa	0–1	2–0	0–1	2–3	2–1	2–2	0–2	3–1	0–3	0–2		0–3	1–2	0–1	0–2	3–0	1–2	1–2
Al-Shorta	2–1	2–0	2–2	0–0	0–1	1–0	1–1	2–1	1–0	1–0	1–1		2–2	2–1	5–2	2–0	2–2	0–0
Al-Sinaa	2–1	3–0	4–1	2–1	2–1	0–0	3–0	2–1	1–3	2–1	1–0	0–2		1–1	0–0	2–1	1–0	3–1
Al-Talaba	1–0	3–0	2–1	1–0	1–0	2–1	1–1	0–3	0–0	4–1	5–1	2–2	2–1		1–0	4–0	1–0	4–0
Karbala	0–1	1–0	1–0	1–0	1–1	2–0	0–0	1–0	2–1	1–1	4–1	1–0	1–0	0–0		4–0	0–0	2–2
Maysan	0–2	0–0	1–1	1–1	3–0	1–0	1–1	1–3	0–3	1–1	0–0	0–1	0–1	0–1	0–1		0–2	1–1
Naft Al-Junoob	2–1	3–0	2–0	2–0	3–0	1–0	1–0	1–2	0–3	0–0	2–1	2–0	1–0	0–0	1–1	3–1		2–0
Naft Maysan	2–0	3–1	5–2	3–0	0–0	2–1	0–2	1–2	1–2	1–1	0–0	2–0	0–0	0–0	0–0	5–0	0–1	

Source: Goalzz
Legend: Blue = home team win; Yellow = draw; Red = away team win.

== Elite stage ==
=== Group 1 ===
Pos	Team	Pld	W	D	L	GF	GA	GD	Pts	Qualification	ZWR	TLB	SIN	BGD
1	Al-Zawraa	6	3	1	2	6	4	+2	10	Qualified to Semi-finals		1–0	3–1	0–1
2	Al-Talaba	6	3	1	2	6	5	+1	10	Qualified to Semi-finals	2–1		1–2	0–0
3	Al-Sinaa	6	2	1	3	7	9	−2	7		0–1	1–2		2–2
4	Baghdad	6	1	3	2	3	4	−1	6		0–0	0–1	0–1	

Source: Goalzz
Rules for classification: 1) points; 2) goal difference; 3) number of goals scored.

=== Group 2 ===
Pos	Team	Pld	W	D	L	GF	GA	GD	Pts	Qualification	ERB	SHR	KAH	NJF
1	Erbil	6	4	0	2	9	5	+4	12	Qualified to Semi-finals		0–1	3–1	2–1
2	Al-Shorta	6	2	3	1	5	5	0	9		0–2		1–1	1–0
3	Al-Kahrabaa	6	2	2	2	6	7	−1	8		1–0	0–0		2–1
4	Al-Najaf	6	1	1	4	7	10	−3	4		1–2	2–2	2–1	

Source: Goalzz
Rules for classification: 1) points; 2) goal difference; 3) number of goals scored.

=== Group 3 ===
Pos	Team	Pld	W	D	L	GF	GA	GD	Pts	Qualification	DUH	QWJ	KRB	NFJ
1	Duhok	6	5	1	0	10	4	+6	16	Qualified to Semi-finals		2–0	3–2	1–0
2	Al-Quwa Al-Jawiya	6	2	3	1	7	3	+4	9		0–0		3–0 (Note: The Al-Quwa Al-Jawiya–Karbala match was awarded as a 3–0 win to Al-Quwa Al-Jawiya, as Karbala did not turn up for the game (which itself was a replay as the original game was abandoned after 50 minutes at 1–1 due to crowd trouble).)	3–0
3	Karbala	6	2	1	3	8	11	−3	7		2–3	1–1		2–1
4	Naft Al-Junoob	6	0	1	5	1	8	−7	1		0–1	0–0	0–1	

Source: Goalzz
Rules for classification: 1) points; 2) goal difference; 3) number of goals scored.

=== Ranking of second-placed teams ===
Pos	Grp	Team	Pld	W	D	L	GF	GA	GD	Pts	Qualification
1	Grp 1	Al-Talaba	6	3	1	2	6	5	+1	10	Advance to Semi-finals
2	Grp 3	Al-Quwa Al-Jawiya	6	2	3	1	7	3	+4	9	
3	Grp 2	Al-Shorta	6	2	3	1	5	5	0	9	

Source: Goalzz

== Golden stage ==
Semi-finals
Erbil	0	0	0
Al-Talaba	1	0	1
Duhok	5	0	5
Al-Zawraa	1	1	2

Final
Al-Talaba	0
Duhok	1
Third place match
Al-Zawraa	2
Erbil	1

=== Semi-finals ===
27 August 2010
13:30 GMT

Erbil	0–1	Al-Talaba
Bangoura (penalty missed) 60'; H. Mulla Mohammed (penalty missed) 90+12'		A. Mohammed 20'; Kadhim (red card) 40'; Abu Al-Hail (red card) 71'

Franso Hariri Stadium, Erbil
31 August 2010
12:30 GMT

Al-Talaba	0–0	Erbil

Al-Karkh Stadium, Baghdad

Al-Talaba won 1–0 on aggregate

27 August 2010
13:30 GMT

Duhok	5–1	Al-Zawraa
Ismail 15', 52'; J. Mohammed 36'; Mnajed 85'; Nassir 90+1'		H. Mohammed 60'

Duhok Stadium, Duhok
31 August 2010
13:30 GMT

Al-Zawraa	1–0	Duhok
Abdul-Amir 86'

Al-Zawraa Stadium, Baghdad

Duhok won 5–2 on aggregate

=== Third place match ===
3 September 2010
16:00 GMT

Al-Zawraa	2–1	Erbil
Turki 45'; Ahmad 59'		Salah 64'

Al-Shaab Stadium, Baghdad

=== Final ===
4 September 2010
17:30 GMT

Al-Talaba	0–1	Duhok
		Mushir 82'

Al-Shaab Stadium, Baghdad
Referee: Falah Abid

Al-Talaba	Duhok

GK	12	(Iraq) Ali Mutashar	(yellow card) 89'
DF	2	(Iraq) Ali Jassim
DF	13	(Iraq) Ayad Khalaf
DF	3	(Iraq) Majid Hameed	(yellow card) 67'
DF	4	(Iraq) Ahmad Abdul-Majid	(red card) 84'
MF	50	(Iraq) Abdul-Wahab Abu Al-Hail (c)
MF	26	(Iraq) Thamir Fuad		(substituted off) 61'
MF	20	(Iraq) Ihab Kadhim		(substituted off) 46'
MF	24	(Iraq) Aqeel Mohammed
MF	14	(Iraq) Nawaf Salal
FW	9	(Iraq) Mohammed Abid Jadaya		(substituted off) 78'
Substitutions:
MF	5	(Iraq) Haidar Abdul-Qadir	(yellow card) 81'	(substituted on) 46'
FW	17	(Iraq) Karrar Tariq		(substituted on) 61'
MF	23	(Iraq) Nadim Karim		(substituted on) 78'
Manager:
(Iraq) Yahya Alwan

GK	21	(Iraq) Oday Taleb
DF	8	(Iraq) Khalid Mushir (c)
DF	18	(Iraq) Adnan Attiya
DF	5	(Iraq) Hassan Mohammed Zaboun
DF	20	(Iraq) Jassim Mohammed Haji
MF	7	(Iraq) Ali Yousef		(substituted off) 67'
MF	16	(Iraq) Mohannad Nassir
MF	34	(Lebanon) Nasrat Al Jamal		(substituted off) 89'
MF	13	(Iraq) Amjad Waleed	(yellow card) 58'	(substituted off) 90+1'
FW	23	(Iraq) Amad Ismail		(substituted off) 46'
FW	88	(Iraq) Ahmad Mnajed
Substitutions:
FW	11	(Iraq) Azad Ahmed	(yellow card) 90'	(substituted on) 46'
FW		(Iraq) Jassim Mohammed Suleiman		(substituted on) 67'
MF	17	(Iraq) Zirvan Mohammed		(substituted on) 89'
MF	12	(Iraq) Ahmed Mamoum		(substituted on) 90+1'
Manager:
(Iraq) Basim Qasim

Match officials

- Assistant referees:
  - Jalil Saifi
  - Maitham Khamat
- Fourth official:
  - Samir Shabib

Match rules

- 90 minutes.
- 30 minutes of extra-time if necessary.
- Penalty shootout if scores still level.

== Season statistics ==
=== Top six positions ===
Pos	Team	Pld	W	D	L	GF	GA	Qualification
1	Duhok	42	26	8	8	71	29	2011 AFC Cup
2	Al-Talaba	43	23	13	7	53	25	2011 AFC Cup
3	Al-Zawraa	42	24	7	11	49	33	
4	Erbil	42	29	6	7	77	22	2011 AFC Cup (invited)
5	Al-Quwa Al-Jawiya	39	24	10	5	67	22	
6	Al-Shorta	40	19	14	7	54	38	

=== Top scorers ===
Rank	Player	Club	Goals
1	(Iraq) Amjad Radhi	Al-Quwa Al-Jawiya	31
2	(Iraq) Hussein Karim	Al-Shorta	21
3	(Iraq) Ali Mansoor	Baghdad	17
3	(Iraq) Ali Jawad	Naft Al-Junoob	17
5	(Iraq) Mustafa Ahmad	Al-Zawraa	16

=== Hat-tricks ===
Player	For	Against	Result	Date
(Iraq) Ammar Abdul-Hussein	Masafi Al-Wasat	Al-Ramadi	3–0	4 January 2010
(Iraq) Hammadi Ahmed	Samarra	Salahaddin	3–3	19 February 2010
(Iraq) Mohammed Salim^{4}	Naft Maysan	Maysan	5–0	30 April 2010
(Iraq) Mustafa Ahmed	Al-Zawraa	Samarra	5–0	22 May 2010
(Iraq) Younis Rashid	Masafi Al-Wasat	Al-Kahrabaa	3–2	26 May 2010
(Iraq) Amjad Radhi	Al-Quwa Al-Jawiya	Al-Kahrabaa	4–1	10 June 2010
(Iraq) Qasem Muhammad	Al-Diwaniya	Al-Kufa	3–2	18 June 2010
(Iraq) Karrar Tariq	Al-Talaba	Al-Samawa	5–1	21 June 2010
(Iraq) Yassir Saadi	Masafi Al-Wasat	Kirkuk	4–3	29 June 2010
(Iraq) Mustafa Ahmed^{4}	Al-Zawraa	Al-Shirqat	4–1	6 July 2010

Notes

^{4} Player scored 4 goals
