= 11th Umm al-Ma'arik Championship =

Umm al-Ma'arik Championship
Tournament details
- Country: Iraq
- Dates: 1–10 February 2002
- Teams: 8

Final positions
- Champions: Al-Shorta
- Runners-up: Al-Talaba
- Third place: Al-Karkh
- Fourth place: Al-Quwa Al-Jawiya

Tournament statistics
- Top goal scorer(s): Younis Mahmoud (4 goals)

Awards
- Best player: Ziyad Tariq

The 11th Umm al-Ma'arik Championship (Arabic: بطولة أم المعارك الحادية عشرة) was the eleventh occurrence of the Baghdad Championship. The competition was organised by the Iraq Football Association and the top eight teams of the 2000–01 Iraqi Elite League competed in the tournament. The competition was held in 2002, from 1 February to 10 February. In the final, held at Al-Shaab Stadium, Al-Shorta defeated Al-Talaba 1–0 to win the cup for the second time in a row.

== Group stage ==
=== Group 1 ===
Team	Pld	W	D	L	GF	GA	GD	Pts	Qualification
Al-Shorta	3	3	0	0	9	4	+5	9	Advanced to semifinals
Al-Karkh	3	1	1	1	2	4	−2	4	Advanced to semifinals
Al-Zawraa	3	1	0	2	5	4	+1	3	
Duhok	3	0	1	2	3	7	−4	1	

Source: RSSSF.com
1 February 2002

Al-Karkh	1–0	Al-Zawraa
Salam 10'; Farah (red card)		Obeid (red card)

Referee: Shaker Mahmoud
1 February 2002

Al-Shorta	3–2	Duhok
Mnajed 15'; Ogla 30'; Mushraf 45'		Abdullah 60'; J. Mohammed 72'

Referee: Mohamad Sahib
3 February 2002

Al-Shorta	3–0	Al-Karkh
Mnajed 9', (penalty missed) 51'; Tariq 25'; Rahim 26'

Referee: Najim Aboud
3 February 2002

Al-Zawraa	3–0	Duhok
E. Mohammed 23', 84', 90+1'

Referee: Alaa Abdul-Qadir
5 February 2002

Al-Karkh	1–1	Duhok
Raja 90'		Abdullah 30'

Referee: Mahdi Faliyh
5 February 2002

Al-Shorta	3–2	Al-Zawraa
Mnajed 5'; Rahim 24'; Ridha 48' (pen.); Qassim (red card)		Hussein 2' (pen.), 60' (pen.), (penalty missed) 62'; Abdul-Jabar (red card)

Referee: Mahmoud Nouraddin

=== Group 2 ===
Team	Pld	W	D	L	GF	GA	GD	Pts	Qualification
Al-Talaba	3	2	1	0	5	2	+3	7	Advanced to semifinals
Al-Quwa Al-Jawiya	3	1	1	1	4	3	+1	4	Advanced to semifinals
Al-Difaa Al-Jawi	3	1	0	2	5	7	−2	3	
Al-Najaf	3	1	0	2	2	4	−2	3	

Source: RSSSF.com
2 February 2002

Al-Najaf	2–1	Al-Quwa Al-Jawiya
Jalout 72', 78'		Swadi 86'

Referee: Sabah Qasim
2 February 2002

Al-Talaba	4–2	Al-Difaa Al-Jawi
Mahmoud 50', 77', 90'; Abbas 75'		Khudhair 83'; Nafaa 87'

Referee: Hazim Hussein
4 February 2002

Al-Difaa Al-Jawi	2–0	Al-Najaf
Ashour 10'; Zaki 70'

Referee: Mohamad Sahib
4 February 2002

Al-Talaba	0–0	Al-Quwa Al-Jawiya

Referee: Abdulhali Khudhair
6 February 2002

Al-Talaba	1–0	Al-Najaf
Mahmoud 22'

Referee: Najim Aboud
6 February 2002

Al-Quwa Al-Jawiya	3–1	Al-Difaa Al-Jawi
Khudhair 22', 66' (pen.); Abbas 69'		Ali 77' (pen.); Abdul-Latif (red card)

Referee: Mahmoud Nouraddin

== Semifinals ==
8 February 2002

Al-Shorta	1–0	Al-Quwa Al-Jawiya
Mushraf 63'

Referee: Hazim Hussein
8 February 2002

Al-Talaba	1–0	Al-Karkh
Kadhim 70'

Referee: Mohamad Sahib

== Third place match ==
10 February 2002

Al-Karkh	2–1	Al-Quwa Al-Jawiya
Hassan 59', 87'		Saddam 65'

Referee: Alaa Abdul-Qadir

== Final ==
10 February 2002

Al-Shorta	1–0 (a.e.t.)	Al-Talaba
Habib 112'

Al-Shaab Stadium, Baghdad
Referee: Mahmoud Nouraddin

Al-Shorta
Al-Talaba

GK	1	(Iraq) Emad Hashim (c)
RB	3	(Iraq) Ziyad Tariq		Substituted off
CB	4	(Iraq) Mahir Habib
CB	27	(Iraq) Khalid Mohammed Sabbar
LB	15	(Iraq) Ahmed Hussein Adan	Booked
RM	13	(Iraq) Abbas Rahim
CM	25	(Iraq) Nashat Akram
CM	8	(Iraq) Mahir Ogla		Substituted off
LM	26	(Iraq) Mohammed Hadi
CF	16	(Iraq) Ahmad Mnajed	Booked	Substituted off
CF	17	(Iraq) Hashim Ridha	Booked
Substitutions:
DF	18	(Iraq) Ahmad Kadhim		Substituted in
FW	9	(Iraq) Ammar Ahmad		Substituted in
FW	11	(Iraq) Amer Mushraf	Booked	Substituted in
Manager:
(Iraq) Yassin Umal

GK	21	(Iraq) Saad Nassir
CB	30	(Iraq) Hamza Hadi	Booked
CB	12	(Iraq) Haidar Abdul-Razzaq	Booked
CB	6	(Iraq) Bassim Abbas		Substituted off
RM	8	(Iraq) Habib Jafar (c)
CM	22	(Iraq) Fawzi Abdul-Sada
CM	20	(Iraq) Bahaa Kadhim
CM	15	(Iraq) Hassan Turki
LM	14	(Iraq) Alaa Nayrouz	Booked
CF	7	(Iraq) Ahmed Salah		Substituted off
CF	28	(Iraq) Younis Mahmoud		Substituted off
Substitutions:
DF	23	(Iraq) Ahmed Wali		Substituted in
FW	10	(Iraq) Alaa Kadhim		Substituted in
FW	11	(Iraq) Sabah Jeayer		Substituted in
Manager:
(Iraq) Thair Ahmed

Assistant referees:
Aziz Karim
Samir Mahna
Sabah Qasim

Match rules

- 90 minutes.
- 30 minutes of golden goal extra time if necessary.
- Penalty shoot-out if scores still level.
- Seven named substitutes, of which up to three may be used.

Umm al-Ma'arik Championship
2001–02 winner
Al-Shorta
2nd title

== Awards ==
Top Goalscorer	Best Player	Best Goalkeeper	Fair Play Award
Younis Mahmoud (Al-Talaba)	Ziyad Tariq (Al-Shorta)	Wissam Gassid (Al-Karkh)	Al-Najaf
