= Moridi =

Moridi (Persian: مریدی) is an Iranian surname. Notable people with the surname include:

- Reza Moridi (born c. 1945), a politician in Ontario, Canada
- Sina Moridi (born 1996), Iranian football midfielder
