= 2001–02 Iraqi Elite League =

Iraqi Elite League
- Season: 2001–02
- Champions: Al-Talaba (5th title)
- Relegated: Al-Ramadi; Al-Diwaniya; Al-Kadhimiya
- AFC Champions League: Al-Talaba
- Top goalscorer: Hashim Ridha (32 goals)

The 2001–02 Iraqi Elite League kicked off on 22 September 2001 and ended on 17 May 2002. Al-Talaba won their fifth league title, finishing six points ahead of Al-Quwa Al-Jawiya and eleven ahead of Al-Shorta. They also won the Iraq FA Cup that season to complete the double, and reached the final of the Umm al-Ma'arik Championship.

== League table ==
Pos	Team	Pld	W	D	L	GF	GA	GD	Pts	Qualification or relegation
1	Al-Talaba (C)	38	29	4	5	89	18	+71	91	2002–03 AFC Champions League group stage (Note: Al-Zawraa had earned continental qualification by winning the previous season's league title, so with Iraq being given two slots for the AFC Champions League, Al-Zawraa were admitted to the qualifying round and Al-Talaba (who also won the Iraq FA Cup) entered the group stage.)
2	Al-Quwa Al-Jawiya	38	26	7	5	86	29	+57	85	
3	Al-Shorta	38	24	8	6	86	36	+50	80	
4	Al-Zawraa	38	22	8	8	70	30	+40	74	
5	Al-Najaf	38	22	8	8	59	25	+34	74	
6	Erbil	38	20	12	6	61	32	+29	72	
7	Duhok	38	19	13	6	61	38	+23	70	
8	Al-Karkh	38	15	9	14	52	42	+10	54	
9	Al-Difaa Al-Jawi	38	13	11	14	51	51	0	50	
10	Al-Minaa	38	13	10	15	39	45	−6	49	
11	Al-Jaish	38	13	9	16	47	60	−13	48	
12	Al-Samawa	38	11	9	18	27	46	−19	42	
13	Al-Naft	38	9	10	19	35	53	−18	37	
14	Samarra	38	7	14	17	37	65	−28	35	
15	Al-Nasiriya	38	8	11	19	34	76	−42	35	
16	Al-Sinaa	38	6	14	18	29	53	−24	32	
17	Kirkuk	38	7	11	20	27	60	−33	32	
18	Al-Kadhimiya (R)	38	6	12	20	29	64	−35	30	Relegation to the Iraqi Second Division League
19	Al-Ramadi (R)	38	8	4	26	26	73	−47	28	Relegation to the Iraqi Second Division League
20	Al-Diwaniya (R)	38	6	8	24	31	80	−49	26	Relegation to the Iraqi Second Division League

Source: Ali Al-Sabti Archive
(C) Champions; (R) Relegated

== Results ==
Home \ Away	DIF	DIW	JSH	KAD	KAR	MIN	NFT	NJF	NAS	QWJ	RAM	SMA	SHR	SIN	TLB	ZWR	DUH	ERB	KIR	SMR
Al-Difaa Al-Jawi		5–1	0–1	1–1	1–1	3–2	1–2	1–0	4–1	1–2	3–1	1–0	1–1	1–1	0–4	0–1	3–1	1–1	0–2	1–0
Al-Diwaniya	2–1		3–1	3–1	2–5	0–0	1–0	0–4	2–2	0–0	2–1	1–2	0–1	0–0	1–4	0–0	2–2	0–1	0–1	2–0
Al-Jaish	2–1	4–0		3–0	1–2	0–2	1–0	1–1	4–0	0–2	2–1	0–2	3–3	4–2	0–3	2–1	2–4	0–2	0–0	3–1
Al-Kadhimiya	0–3	1–0	2–2		0–0	3–0	2–0	0–6	0–1	1–3	1–1	0–1	1–1	2–1	0–0	1–2	1–2	0–7	1–1	1–1
Al-Karkh	1–0	3–1	1–0	3–0		4–1	0–0	0–1	3–0	0–1	2–0	0–0	1–2	1–0	0–2	2–3	0–1	0–0	3–0	4–2
Al-Minaa	3–0	2–1	0–0	0–1	1–0		0–1	2–1	0–0	1–1	2–0	1–0	1–2	1–1	0–0	1–2	1–1	0–0	0–0	1–0
Al-Naft	0–1	3–2	0–1	0–0	1–5	1–0		0–1	5–0	0–1	0–1	1–1	0–1	1–1	1–4	0–1	0–0	1–1	2–1	2–1
Al-Najaf	1–1	2–0	2–0	1–1	2–1	2–0	1–1		4–0	1–0	2–0	1–0	0–1	0–0	0–1	0–0	1–0	5–0	1–0	3–1
Al-Nasiriya	3–1	0–0	1–0	1–1	1–1	2–3	0–1	1–3		0–1	1–0	0–0	1–1	2–0	0–1	2–3	0–1	1–1	3–1	1–1
Al-Quwa Al-Jawiya	3–0	6–1	3–1	3–1	4–1	2–0	4–1	3–0	6–0		6–2	4–1	2–2	4–1	3–1	1–1	3–0	1–0	7–1	1–0
Al-Ramadi	1–2	1–0	1–3	2–1	0–1	1–5	1–0	0–0	2–1	0–2		1–0	0–1	0–0	1–0	0–2	0–4	0–4	3–0	1–2
Al-Samawa	1–1	3–1	0–0	2–0	0–0	0–1	2–2	0–1	2–0	1–2	1–0		0–3	1–0	0–1	0–2	0–1	1–0	2–1	1–0
Al-Shorta	0–0	8–1	4–1	3–1	2–0	1–2	4–2	0–2	5–0	3–2	2–0	4–0		3–1	2–1	2–5	2–1	1–2	4–0	7–0
Al-Sinaa	1–5	2–0	1–1	3–1	0–1	2–2	1–1	0–3	0–0	1–1	4–1	1–0	0–1		0–1	0–0	2–0	0–1	1–2	0–1
Al-Talaba	1–2	3–0	3–2	0–1	1–0	4–0	3–0	2–1	6–1	2–0	3–0	2–0	3–1	5–0		2–0	6–0	2–1	8–0	3–0
Al-Zawraa	3–0	3–0	6–0	2–0	5–2	1–0	1–2	1–2	1–2	1–0	6–0	6–0	0–0	1–2	1–2		1–1	0–0	2–0	4–1
Duhok	1–1	2–0	5–0	2–1	3–1	2–0	1–1	3–1	4–1	0–0	2–1	1–0	1–1	3–0	0–0	0–0		3–0	3–1	0–0
Erbil	1–1	2–1	1–2	2–1	2–2	4–2	2–1	2–2	5–1	2–0	1–0	3–0	1–0	2–0	0–0	3–0	1–1		0–0	4–2
Kirkuk	0–0	3–0	0–0	0–0	2–1	0–1	2–1	0–1	1–2	0–1	3–0	2–2	0–3	0–0	0–2	0–1	1–2	0–1		1–1
Samarra	4–3	1–1	0–0	1–0	0–0	2–1	3–1	2–0	2–2	1–1	2–2	1–1	0–4	0–0	0–3	0–1	3–3	0–1	1–1	

Source: Ali Al-Sabti Archive
Legend: Blue = home team win; Yellow = draw; Red = away team win.

== Season statistics ==
=== Top scorers ===
Pos	Scorer	Goals	Team
1	Hashim Ridha	32	Al-Shorta
2	Hussein Abdullah	29	Duhok
3	Ahmed Khudhair	23	Al-Quwa Al-Jawiya
4	Nasser Tallaa	21	Al-Minaa
5	Haidar Ayed	20	Al-Nasiriya

=== Hat-tricks ===
Player	For	Against	Result	Date
(Iraq) Ahmed Khudhair	Al-Quwa Al-Jawiya	Al-Sinaa	4–1	22 September 2001
(Iraq) Younis Mahmoud	Al-Talaba	Kirkuk	8–0	22 September 2001
(Iraq) Sabah Jeayer	Al-Talaba	Kirkuk	8–0	22 September 2001
(Iraq) Hashim Ridha^{4}	Al-Shorta	Samarra	7–0	27 September 2001
(Iraq) Hassan Turki	Al-Talaba	Al-Diwaniya	3–0	12 October 2001
(Iraq) Dhurgham Ali	Al-Quwa Al-Jawiya	Kirkuk	7–1	12 October 2001
(Iraq) Hashim Ridha^{4}	Al-Shorta	Al-Samawa	4–0	29 October 2001
(Iraq) Jumaa Khudhair	Al-Difaa Al-Jawi	Al-Sinaa	5–1	16 November 2001
(Iraq) Hussein Abdullah	Duhok	Al-Jaish	5–0	21 December 2001
(Iraq) Ahmed Khudhair	Al-Quwa Al-Jawiya	Al-Samawa	4–1	3 January 2002
(Iraq) Ali Raja	Al-Karkh	Samarra	4–2	11 January 2002
(Iraq) Arkan Mahmoud^{4}	Al-Difaa Al-Jawi	Al-Diwaniya	5–1	11 January 2002
(Iraq) Majid Abbas	Al-Diwaniya	Al-Jaish	3–1	18 January 2002
(Iraq) Hussein Abdullah	Duhok	Samarra	3–3	18 January 2002
(Iraq) Hussam Fawzi	Al-Zawraa	Al-Ramadi	6–0	16 February 2002
(Iraq) Amer Mushraf	Al-Shorta	Al-Diwaniya	8–1	11 March 2002
(Iraq) Hashim Ridha	Al-Shorta	Al-Diwaniya	8–1	11 March 2002
(Iraq) Sahib Abbas	Al-Talaba	Al-Naft	4–1	15 March 2002
(Iraq) Hamid Qasim	Al-Jaish	Al-Ramadi	3–1	29 March 2002
(Iraq) Qusay Hashim	Al-Talaba	Al-Nasiriya	6–1	1 April 2002
(Iraq) Ihsan Hadi	Al-Minaa	Al-Ramadi	5–1	12 April 2002
(Iraq) Hussam Fawzi^{4}	Al-Zawraa	Al-Samawa	6–0	19 April 2002
(Iraq) Aqil Mutaab	Al-Karkh	Al-Naft	5–1	19 April 2002
(Iraq) Faris Hameed	Al-Jaish	Al-Shorta	3–3	3 May 2002
(Iraq) Ahmed Owaid	Al-Najaf	Erbil	5–0	3 May 2002

Notes

^{4} Player scored 4 goals
