= Mohammed Hammad =

Iraqi footballer

Personal information
- Full name: Mohammed Hammad
- Date of birth: 3 September 1989 (age 37)
- Place of birth: Iraq
- Position: Striker

Team information
- Current team: Al-Nawair
- Number: 29

Youth career
- Al-Ramadi FC
- Al-Quwa Al-Jawiya

Senior career*
Years	Team	Apps	(Gls)
2006–2007	Duhok FC	?	(?)
2007–2008	Al-Futowa	9	(7)
2008–	Al-Nawair	0	(0)

International career^{‡}
2007–	Iraq u-19		
- * Club domestic league appearances and goals as of n/a ‡ National team caps and goals as of n/a

Mohammed Hammad (Arabic: مُحَمَّد الْحَمَّاد; born 3 September 1989 in Iraq) is an Iraqi footballer. He currently plays for Al-Nawair in Syria.
