= 2010–11 Iraqi Elite League =

Iraqi Elite League
- Season: 2010–11
- Champions: Al-Zawraa (12th title)
- Relegated: Naft Al-Junoob; Al-Mosul; Al-Ramadi; Naft Maysan; Peshmerga; Al-Diwaniya; Diyala; Al-Nasiriya; Samarra; Al-Hasanain; Al-Hindiya; Al-Jaish
- AFC Cup: Al-Zawraa; Erbil
- Matches: 366
- Goals: 785 (2.14 per match)
- Top goalscorer: Luay Salah (17 goals)
- Biggest home win: Al-Talaba 6–0 Al-Hasanain (21 May 2011)
- Biggest away win: Al-Jaish 0–5 Duhok (12 July 2011)
- Longest winning run: 6 matches Erbil; Al-Quwa Al-Jawiya; Al-Zawraa
- Longest unbeaten run: 16 matches Al-Zawraa
- Longest winless run: 22 matches Al-Hindiya
- Longest losing run: 11 matches Al-Hindiya; Al-Hasanain

The 2010–11 Iraqi Elite League (known as the Asiacell Elite League for sponsorship reasons) was the 37th edition of the competition. The name of the league was changed from Iraqi Premier League to Iraqi Elite League. The season began on 26 November 2010, and ended on 15 August 2011. Duhok were the defending champions.

The season's final was won by Al-Zawraa after defeating Erbil on penalties. This was their 12th title.

== Group stage ==
=== North Group ===
Pos	Team	Pld	W	D	L	GF	GA	GD	Pts	Qualification or relegation
1	Erbil	26	17	5	4	54	21	+33	56	Qualified to the Final
2	Al-Sinaa	26	16	7	3	31	17	+14	55	Qualified to Third place match
3	Zakho	26	16	5	5	38	21	+17	53	
4	Al-Kahrabaa	26	12	7	7	32	22	+10	43	
5	Al-Karkh	26	10	11	5	35	27	+8	41	
6	Duhok	26	12	4	10	36	28	+8	40	
7	Al-Naft	26	10	9	7	25	23	+2	39	
8	Al-Shorta	26	8	11	7	28	23	+5	35	
9	Al-Mosul	26	8	11	7	29	29	0	35	Relegated to the Iraqi First Division League
10	Al-Ramadi	26	7	7	12	28	40	−12	28	Relegated to the Iraqi First Division League
11	Peshmerga	26	5	7	14	19	31	−12	22	Relegated to the Iraqi First Division League
12	Diyala	26	3	10	13	15	33	−18	19	Relegated to the Iraqi First Division League
13	Samarra	26	4	6	16	24	44	−20	18	Relegated to the Iraqi First Division League
14	Al-Jaish	26	1	6	19	12	47	−35	9	Relegated to the Iraqi First Division League

Source: Goalzz

==== Results ====
Home \ Away	JSH	KAH	KAR	MSL	NFT	RAM	SHR	SIN	DIY	DUH	ERB	PSH	SMR	ZAK
Al-Jaish		1–3	0–1	0–1	0–1	1–1	2–2	0–1	2–2	0–5	0–3	0–0	1–0	0–2
Al-Kahrabaa	1–0		1–1	2–1	0–0	2–1	0–2	1–1	2–0	0–2	2–2	4–1	3–2	1–2
Al-Karkh	1–0	2–2		0–0	1–1	1–0	0–0	1–1	3–1	4–0	1–1	2–2	3–0	4–2
Al-Mosul	1–0	1–0	1–2		1–1	1–1	0–0	0–1	1–1	1–2	2–2	1–0	3–1	2–2
Al-Naft	1–0	0–1	0–0	1–1		2–1	2–0	0–0	1–1	3–0	0–2	2–1	1–2	1–0
Al-Ramadi	5–1	0–0	1–2	1–3	3–2		2–1	1–0	1–1	0–0	2–5	1–0	1–1	1–0
Al-Shorta	2–1	0–3	0–0	1–2	2–0	4–0		1–1	1–1	1–0	3–1	2–0	3–1	0–0
Al-Sinaa	1–0	1–0	3–1	2–1	0–0	1–0	0–0		1–0	3–2	2–1	2–1	3–1	1–0
Diyala	2–1	0–1	0–1	0–0	0–1	1–2	1–1	0–0		0–0	0–0	1–0	1–0	0–1
Duhok	1–1	0–1	2–1	2–1	1–2	4–0	1–0	0–1	3–0 (Note: The Duhok–Diyala match was awarded as a 3–0 win to Duhok, as Diyala did not turn up for the game.)		1–0	3–2	2–0	1–1
Erbil	5–0	1–0	3–1	4–0	3–0	2–1	2–0	3–1	4–0	2–1		1–1	2–0	2–1
Peshmerga	3–0	0–0	1–1	0–0	0–1	1–0	2–1	0–1	1–0	1–0	0–1		0–0	0–3
Samarra	1–1	0–2	3–1	2–3	1–1	2–2	0–0	1–2	2–1	1–2	0–2	2–1		1–2
Zakho	1–0	1–0	2–0	1–1	2–1	2–0	1–1	2–1	3–1	2–1	2–0	2–1	1–0	

Source: Goalzz
Legend: Blue = home team win; Yellow = draw; Red = away team win.

=== South Group ===
Pos	Team	Pld	W	D	L	GF	GA	GD	Pts	Qualification or relegation
1	Al-Zawraa	26	19	5	2	45	15	+30	62	Qualified to the Final
2	Al-Quwa Al-Jawiya	26	19	3	4	47	13	+34	60	Qualified to Third place match
3	Baghdad	26	13	8	5	32	17	+15	47	
4	Al-Minaa	26	12	9	5	33	21	+12	45	
5	Karbala	26	13	6	7	23	17	+6	45	
6	Al-Najaf	26	11	9	6	34	20	+14	42	
7	Masafi Al-Wasat	26	12	5	9	22	28	−6	41	
8	Al-Talaba	26	9	11	6	33	25	+8	38	
9	Naft Al-Junoob	26	9	10	7	28	24	+4	37	Relegated to the Iraqi First Division League
10	Naft Maysan	26	6	7	13	20	29	−9	25	Relegated to the Iraqi First Division League
11	Al-Diwaniya	26	5	6	15	25	45	−20	21	Relegated to the Iraqi First Division League
12	Al-Nasiriya	26	3	5	18	13	38	−25	14	Relegated to the Iraqi First Division League
13	Al-Hasanain	26	3	4	19	7	39	−32	13	Relegated to the Iraqi First Division League
14	Al-Hindiya	26	2	4	20	16	47	−31	10	Relegated to the Iraqi First Division League

Source: Goalzz

==== Results ====
Home \ Away	DIW	HAS	HIN	MIN	NJF	NAS	QWJ	TLB	ZWR	BGD	KRB	MAS	NFJ	NFM
Al-Diwaniya		3–0	1–0	2–2	1–1	3–0	1–3	0–1	1–2	2–4	0–1	1–2	1–1	1–0
Al-Hasanain	0–0		0–0	0–1	1–2	1–0	0–2	0–1	0–2	0–2	0–2	1–2	1–0	0–0
Al-Hindiya	2–2	3–1		1–2	0–1	2–1	2–4	1–2	0–4	1–1	0–2	0–1	0–1	0–1
Al-Minaa	3–1	2–0	1–0		0–0	1–0	2–1	2–0	3–1	0–0	0–1	2–0	0–0	1–1
Al-Najaf	4–1	2–0	5–1	1–0		3–1	0–0	4–1	1–1	1–2	2–0	1–0	1–1	2–1
Al-Nasiriya	3–1	2–0	2–0	1–1	0–0		0–2	0–0	0–1	0–2	0–1	0–2	0–1	2–2
Al-Quwa Al-Jawiya	3–0	1–0	4–0	2–1	2–0	2–1		2–1	2–0	0–0	2–0	3–0	2–0	1–0
Al-Talaba	1–1	6–0	3–0	4–2	0–0	1–0	0–0		0–0	1–0	2–2	1–1	1–1	2–2
Al-Zawraa	5–0	2–1	2–1	2–1	1–0	3–0	1–0	2–0		0–0	1–0	3–0	4–2	0–0
Baghdad	2–0	2–0	1–0	1–1	2–1	3–0	0–2	0–0	0–1		1–1	0–0	2–1	2–1
Karbala	0–2	1–0	0–0	0–0	1–0	2–0	1–0	1–0	1–2	1–3		1–0	3–1	0–0
Masafi Al-Wasat	1–0	1–0	2–1	1–2	2–2	1–0	1–5	1–0	0–2	1–0	0–0		0–0	1–0
Naft Al-Junoob	3–0	0–0	1–0	0–0	0–0	0–0	1–0	3–3	1–2	2–1	0–1	3–1		3–1
Naft Maysan	1–0	0–1	2–1	1–3	1–0	3–0 (Note: The Naft Maysan–Al-Nasiriya match was awarded as a 3–0 win to Naft Maysan, as Al-Nasiriya did not turn up for the game.)	1–2	0–2	1–1	0–1	1–0	0–1	0–2	

Source: Goalzz
Legend: Blue = home team win; Yellow = draw; Red = away team win.

== Championship play-off ==
Team 1	Score	Team 2
Third place match
Al-Quwa Al-Jawiya	0–1	Al-Sinaa
Final
Al-Zawraa	0–0 (a.e.t.) (5–4 p.)	Erbil

=== Third place match ===
13 August 2011
18:00 GMT

Al-Quwa Al-Jawiya	0–1	Al-Sinaa
		Shaalan 79'

Al-Shaab Stadium, Baghdad

=== Final ===
15 August 2011
18:00 GMT

Al-Zawraa	0–0 (a.e.t.)	Erbil
Penalties
Saeed (penalty scored); Saad (penalty scored); Khalid (penalty scored); Hussein (penalty scored); H. Sabah (penalty scored)	5–4	(penalty scored) Karim; (penalty scored) Ibrahim; (penalty missed) N. Sabah; (penalty scored) Qaraman; (penalty scored) Shakor

Al-Shaab Stadium, Baghdad
Attendance: 50,000
Referee: Kadhim Awda

Al-Zawraa	Erbil

GK	22	(Iraq) Ammar Ali
DF	13	(Iraq) Muayad Khalid
DF	44	(Iraq) Faris Hassan
DF	28	(Iraq) Sajjad Hussein
DF	23	(Iraq) Azhar Tahir
MF	17	(Iraq) Haidar Sabah
MF	99	(Iraq) Osama Ali	(substituted off) 111'
MF	14	(Iraq) Mohammed Ahmed	(substituted off) 28'
MF	88	(Iraq) Samer Saeed
FW	10	(Iraq) Ali Saad	(substituted off) 85'
FW	8	(Iraq) Husham Mohammed (c)
Substitutions:
MF	60	(Iraq) Mohammed Saad	(substituted on) 28'
FW	18	(Iraq) Ali Qasim	(substituted on) 85'
MF	9	(Iraq) Ahmad Abdul-Jabar	(substituted on) 111'
Manager:
(Iraq) Radhi Shenaishil

GK	21	(Iraq) Sarhang Muhsin (c)
DF	2	(Iraq) Saad Attiya	(yellow card) 41'
DF	4	(Iraq) Mohammed Ali Karim
DF	14	(Iraq) Haidar Abdul-Amir
DF	26	(Iraq) Ous Ibrahim
MF	17	(Iraq) Nabeel Sabah
MF	25	(Iraq) Saad Abdul-Amir		(substituted off) 77'
MF	6	(Iraq) Mahdi Karim
MF	20	(Iraq) Hussein Abdul-Wahed
FW	10	(Iraq) Muslim Mubarak
FW	11	(Iraq) Luay Salah		(substituted off) 120'
Substitutions:
MF	18	(Iraq) Haidar Qaraman		(substituted on) 77'
FW	9	(Iraq) Younis Shakor		(substituted on) 120'
Manager:
(Iraq) Ayoub Odisho

Match officials

- Assistant referees:
  - Luay Subhi
  - Mohammed Khalaf

Match rules

- 90 minutes.
- 30 minutes of extra-time if necessary.
- Penalty shootout if scores still level.

== Season statistics ==
=== Top four positions ===
Pos	Team	Pld	W	D	L	GF	GA	Qualification
1	Al-Zawraa	27	19	6	2	45	15	2012 AFC Cup
2	Erbil	27	17	6	4	54	21	2012 AFC Cup
3	Al-Sinaa	27	17	7	3	32	17	
4	Al-Quwa Al-Jawiya	27	19	3	5	47	14	

=== Top scorers ===
Rank	Player	Club	Goals
1	(Iraq) Luay Salah	Erbil	17
2	(Iraq) Amjad Radhi	Al-Quwa Al-Jawiya	13
3	(Iraq) Mahdi Karim	Erbil	12
3	(Iraq) Hussam Ibrahim	Al-Minaa	12
3	(Iraq) Hammadi Ahmed	Al-Quwa Al-Jawiya	12

=== Hat-tricks ===
Player	For	Against	Result	Date
(Iraq) Mustafa Jawad	Al-Karkh	Duhok	4–0	29 May 2011
(Iraq) Ahmed Salah^{4}	Duhok	Al-Jaish	5–0	12 July 2011

Notes

^{4} Player scored 4 goals
