= Safwan Abdul-Ghani =

Iraqi footballer (born 1983)

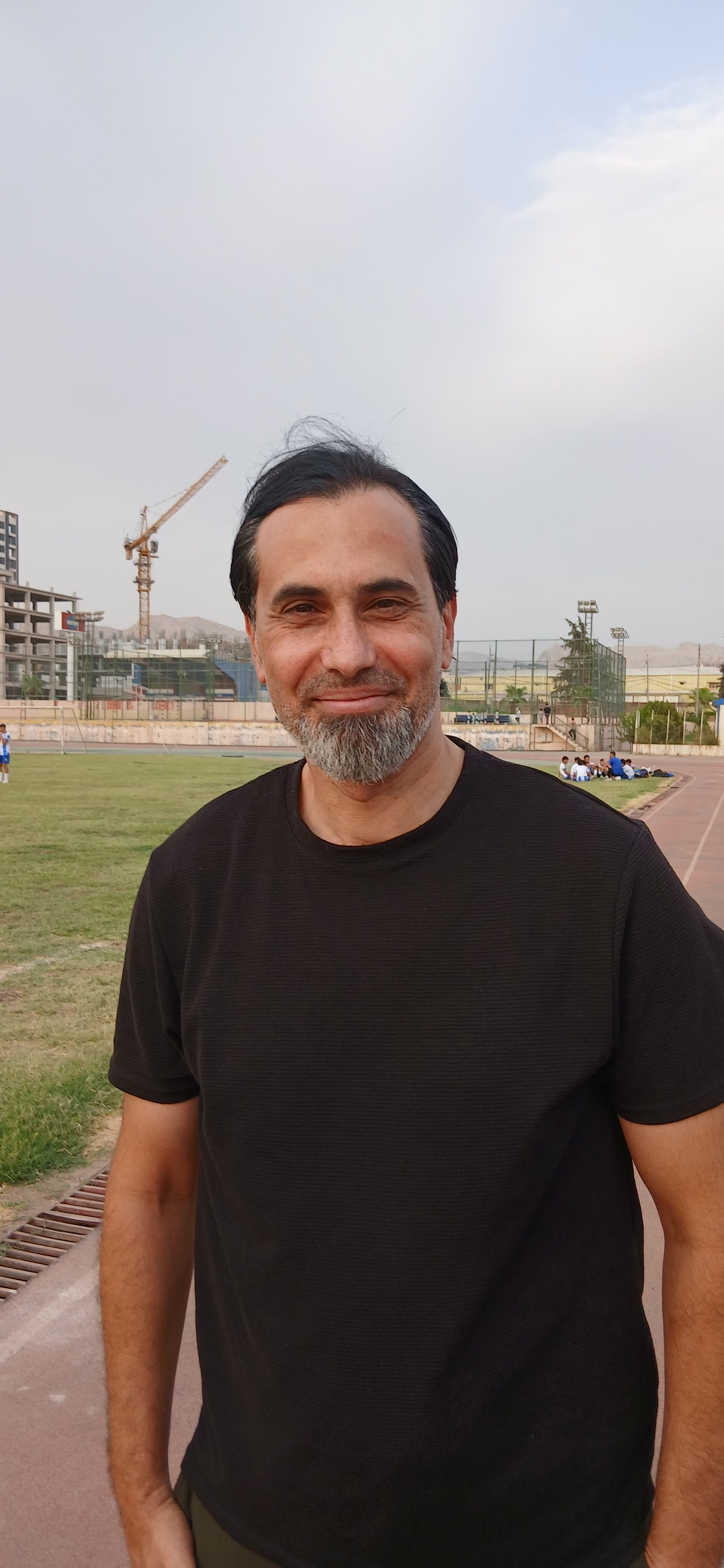

Personal information
- Full name: Safwan Abdul-Ghani Mohammed
- Date of birth: September 9, 1983 (age 43)
- Place of birth: Iraq
- Height: 1.89 m (6 ft 2 in)
- Position: Midfielder

Senior career*
Years	Team	Apps	(Gls)
2004–2005	Sirwan FC	30	
2005–2006	Al-Quwa Al-Jawiya	35	(2)
2006–2007	Arbil FC	26	(1)
2007–2008	Al-Ramtha SC	29	(1)
2008–2009	Duhok FC	34	(2)
2009–2010	Al-Quwa Al-Jawiya	21	(0)
2010–2011	Zakho FC	11	(0)
2011–2012	Al-Shorta		(1)
2012–2013	Zakho FC		
2013–2015	Najaf		

International career^{‡}
2005–2009	Iraq	7	(0)

Managerial career
- 2023-2024: Al-Sina'a
- 2024: Al-Quwa Al-Jawiya (assistant)
- 2024 -: Al-Ramadi
- * Club domestic league appearances and goals as of N/A ‡ National team caps and goals as of 31 May 2009

Safwan Abdul-Ghani Mohammed (Arabic: صَفْوَان عَبْد الْغَنِيّ مُحَمَّد; born September 9, 1983, in Iraq) is a former Iraqi football player who last played for Najaf in Iraq. The last position was the manager of Al-Ramadi SC (2024–2025).

== Managerial career ==
After many years as a TV Pundit, Safwan Abdul Ghani was hired as head coach for Al-Sina'a football club. He left the team in April due to receiving an offer from Qatari channel Al-Kass to work as a pundit during the 2024 AFC U-23 Asian Cup. Prior to his resignation, the team had an impressive record of nine clean sheets in 14 matches. Al-Sina'a ended up missing out on the playoffs on goal difference.

In May 2024, he joined the coaching staff of Al-Quwa Al-Jawiya as an assistant.

In October 2024, he was announced as the manager of Al-Ramadi SC ahead of the 2024–25 Iraqi Premier Division League.His first match was a 1–1 draw against Masafi Al Janoub.

== Managerial statistics ==
As of match played 22 October 2024

Managerial record by team and tenure
Team	From Starting Date	To Ending Date	Record					Ref.
Team	From Starting Date	To Ending Date	P	W	D	L	Win %	Ref.
Al-Sinaa SC	1 Oct 2023	24 Dec 2023	14	5	8	1	35.7	
Al-Ramadi	20 Oct 2024		1	0	1	0	0.0	
Total			15	5	9	1	33.3	—

== Honours ==
=== Club ===
Erbil SC

- Iraqi Stars League: Winner 06-7

=== Country ===
- 2005 West Asian Games Gold medallist.
