= Haidar Abdul-Razzaq =

Iraqi footballer (1982–2022)

Personal information
- Full name: Haidar Abdul-Razzaq Hassan
- Date of birth: 9 June 1982
- Place of birth: Baghdad, Iraq
- Date of death: 5 June 2022 (aged 39)
- Place of death: Baghdad, Iraq
- Height: 1.75 m (5 ft 9 in)
- Position: Defender

Youth career
- 1995–1999: Al-Talaba

Senior career*
Years	Team	Apps	(Gls)
1999–2002	Al-Talaba		
2002	Al Ahli SC		
2002–2003	Al-Ansar		
2003–2005	Al-Talaba		
2005–2006	Al-Ittihad		
2006–2007	Al Ahli Saida SC		
2007–2008	Duhok		
2008–2009	Al-Talaba		
2009–2010	Al-Zawra'a SC		
2010–2011	Al-Karkh		
2011	FK Andijon		
2011–2012	Al-Karkh		
2012–2014	Sulaymaniyah		

International career
2001–2007	Iraq	24	(0)
Medal record
Men's football
Representing Iraq
AFC Asian Cup
Winner	2007 Indonesia/Malaysia/ Thailand/Vietnam
- * Club domestic league appearances and goals

Haidar Abdul-Razzaq Hassan (Arabic: حَيْدَر عَبْد الرَّزَّاق حَسَن; 9 June 1982 – 5 June 2022) was an Iraqi footballer who played as a defender. He played for the Iraq national team internationally.

== Career ==
Haidar Abdul-Razzaq was a talented versatile player capable of playing anywhere in defence. He began his playing career with the Talaba youth team in 1995, he had been playing as a goalkeeper for Al-Shurta youth team before switching to defence. In 1996, he was one of five players brought into the Talaba first team by coach Nazar Ashraf, two years later he was called into the Iraqi Under-17s by Adnan Hamad. He also played under the same coach while with the Iraqi Under-19s. winning the AFC Youth Championship final over Japan in dramatic style. Haidar was called up by Milan Zivadinovic for Iraq's 2002 World Cup qualifiers, making his international debut on 31 January 2000 against Lebanon in Beirut, in a 0–0 draw. He made three other appearances in the 2002 World Cup qualifiers against Bahrain, Saudi Arabia and Iran while Iraq was coached by Croatian Rudolf Belin. He signed for Al-Ansar in Lebanon in 2002 but returned after the end of the war to rejoin Talaba and cemented himself a place on the right-side of defence in the Olympic team.

== Death ==
Haidar died on 5 June 2022, after being assaulted several days before by unknown persons in Baghdad.

== Honours ==
Al-Talaba

- Iraqi Premier League: 2001–02
- Iraq FA Cup: 2001–02

Iraq

- WAFF Championship: 2002
- Summer Olympic Games: fourth place 2004
- West Asian Games: 2005
- AFC Asian Cup: 2007
