= Ali Mutashar =

Iraqi footballer

Personal information
- Full name: Ali Mutashar Nassir
- Date of birth: 7 May 1989 (age 37)
- Place of birth: Baghdad, Iraq
- Height: 1.85 m (6 ft 1 in)
- Position: Goalkeeper

Team information
- Current team: Al-Sinaa
- Number: 12

Senior career*
Years	Team	Apps	(Gls)
2006–2007	Al-Kadhimiya SC		
2007–2009	Al-Naft		
2009–2011	Al-Talaba		
2011	Al-Shorta		
2012–2014	Al-Talaba		
2014	Duhok		
2014–2015	Al-Karkh		
2015–2021	Najaf		
2021–	Al-Sinaa		

International career
2007–2008	Iraq U20	3	(0)
2010–2011	Iraq	4	(0)
- * Club domestic league appearances and goals

Ali Mutashar (Arabic: علي مطشر; born 7 May 1989) is an Iraqi football goalkeeper who plays for Al-Sinaa.
