= Arkan Najeeb =

Iraqi association football player

Personal information
- Full name: Arkan Najeeb
- Date of birth: 2 December 1982 (age 43)
- Place of birth: Iraq
- Position: Forward

International career
Years	Team	Apps	(Gls)
2002	Iraq	1	(0)

Arkan Najeeb (born December 2 1982) is an Iraqi former football forward who played for Iraq at the 2001 FIFA World Youth Championship.

Najeeb made 1 appearance for the national team in 2002.
