= Mahir Habib =

Iraqi footballer and manager

Mahir Habib Radhi
Personal information
- Date of birth: 19 June 1977 (age 49)
- Place of birth: Basra, Iraq
- Position: Defender

Youth career
- 1990–1992: Al-Zubair

Senior career*
Years	Team	Apps	(Gls)
1992–1993	Al-Bahri		
1993–1995	Al-Minaa		
1995–2009	Al-Shorta		

International career
1999	Iraq U23		
1999–2001	Iraq	9	(0)
- * Club domestic league appearances and goals

Mahir Habib Radhi (Arabic: مَاهِر حَبِيب رَاضِي; born 19 June 1977) is a former Iraqi football defender and is currently the assistant manager of Al-Shorta. He also played for Al-Shorta and scored the winning goal in the 11th Umm al-Ma'arik Championship final. He played for the Iraqi national team in the 2000 AFC Asian Cup.

During the 2002 World Cup qualifiers, coach Adnan Hamad who made several changes to the squad kept him in the final squad, but after being blamed for a goal against Saudi Arabia, he never played for Iraq again.
