= Matthew Mbuta =

Cameroonian footballer

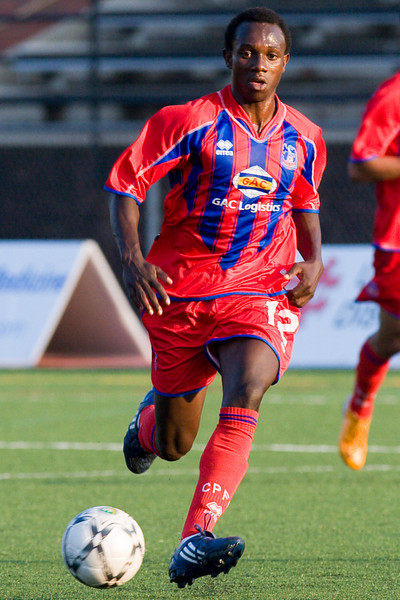
- Mbuta with Crystal Palace Baltimore in 2008

Personal information
- Full name: Matthew Andongcho Mbuta
- Date of birth: 21 December 1985 (age 40)
- Place of birth: Bamenda, Cameroon
- Height: 5 ft 9 in (1.75 m)
- Positions: Attacking midfielder; winger

Senior career*
Years	Team	Apps	(Gls)
2004–2006	PWD Bamenda		
2006	→ DPMM (loan)		(4)
2007–2008	Crystal Palace Baltimore	33	(7)
2008–2009	New York Red Bulls	12	(2)
2009	→ Richmond Kickers (loan)	1	(0)
2009	→ Crystal Palace Baltimore (loan)	3	(2)
2010	Crystal Palace Baltimore	25	(1)
2012	Syrianska	9	(0)
2013	Army United	9	(1)
2013–2014	Duhok	8	(3)
2014–2016	Naft Maysan		
2016–2018	Al-Najaf		
2018	Shabab Majdal Anjar		

International career
2011–2012	Cameroon	5	(1)
- * Club domestic league appearances and goals

Matthew Andongcho Mbuta (born 21 December 1985) is a Cameroonian former footballer who played as an attacking midfielder.

== Career ==
=== Africa and Asia ===
Mbuta began his career with PWD Bamenda of the Cameroon Première Division. In his first season with the club he striker scored 12 goals in 20 appearances, and emerged as the third best player of the championship. Thanks to his play, PWD qualified for the CAF Cup, where the club reached the quarterfinal stage, with Mbuta netting five goals in four continental matches.

At the start of 2006, Mbuta moved on loan to Brunei with DPMM FC of the Malaysia Premier League. His loan ended in May after scoring four goals, helping the club reach third place and qualifying them to the Malaysia Super League play-offs.

=== United States ===
In 2007 Mbuta moved to the United States to play for Crystal Palace Baltimore in the USL Second Division. In his first season with Baltimore he was named in the USL-2 All-League First-Team for scoring 5 goals in 16 games and also recording 7 assists. In his second season with Baltimore, he was named in the USL-2 All-League Second-Team. His play with Crystal Palace Baltimore, especially during the 2008 US Open Cup where Mbuta faced Major League Soccer opposition, helped generate interest amongst the United States top-flight clubs.

Mbuta was signed by New York Red Bulls of Major League Soccer on 15 September 2008 and made his debut against Colorado Rapids on 27 September 2008, in which he managed to score a goal in the 5–4 loss. He was loaned to his old club Crystal Palace Baltimore in May 2009. The second time he scored for the Red Bulls was the last goal ever at Giants Stadium. He successfully converted a penalty kick in second half stoppage time to cap a 5–0 victory over Toronto FC in the 2009 regular season finale on 24 October.

He was released by New York prior to the 2010 season. Shortly thereafter he re-signed with Crystal Palace Baltimore. In March 2011, the club was dissolved.

=== Europe ===
Despite being a Cameroon international at the time, Mbuta went on an unsuccessful trial with FC Dinamo București in Romania in September 2011. In April 2012, Mbuta signed with Syrianska of the Swedish top-flight Allsvenskan. His Nordic stay lasted only a few months and by summer 2012 he was out of contract.

=== Asia ===
Mbuta joined Army United F.C. of the Thai Premier League at the start of the 2013 Thai Premier League season, but was released after six months, scoring once in nine games. For the 2013–14 campaign, Mbuta signed with Duhok SC in the Iraqi Premier League. He prolonged his stay in Iraq for four years, playing for Naft Maysan SC and afterwards Al-Najaf SC, before leaving for his last playing destination with 2017–18 Lebanese Second Division bottom side Shabab Majdal Anjar Club.

== Career statistics ==
(correct as of 26 September 2010)

Club	Season	League			Lamar Hunt US Open Cup			Play-offs			CONCACAF			Total		
Club	Season	Apps	Goals	Assists	Apps	Goals	Assists	Apps	Goals	Assists	Apps	Goals	Assists	Apps	Goals	Assists
Crystal Palace Baltimore	2007	16	5	7	1	0	0	-	-	-	-	-	-	17	5	7
Crystal Palace Baltimore	2008	17	2	2	3	1	0	2	0	0	-	-	-	22	3	2
Total	2007–present	33	7	9	4	1	0	2	0	0	-	-	-	39	8	9
New York Red Bulls	2008	2	1	0	-	-	-	-	-	-	-	-	-	2	1	0
New York Red Bulls	2009	10	1	0	1	0	0	-	-	-	-	-	-	11	1	0
Total	2008–2009	12	2	0	1	0	0	0	0	0	-	-	-	13	2	0
Richmond Kickers (loan)	2009	1	0	0	-	-	-	-	-	-	-	-	-	1	0	0
Total	2009	1	0	0	-	-	-	-	-	-	-	-	-	1	0	0
Crystal Palace Baltimore (loan)	2009	3	2	0	-	-	-	-	-	-	-	-	-	3	2	0
Crystal Palace Baltimore	2010	25	2	0	1	0	0	-	-	-	-	-	-	26	2	0
Total	2010–present	25	2	0	1	0	0	0	0	0	-	-	-	26	2	0
Total	2007–present	75	13	9	5	1	0	2	0	0	-	-	-	82	14	9
