= Ziyad Tariq =

Iraqi footballer (born 1977)

Personal information
- Full name: Ziyad Tariq Aziz Brisam
- Date of birth: 2 August 1977 (age 49)
- Place of birth: Iraq
- Position: Defender

Senior career*
Years	Team	Apps	(Gls)
1993–1996	Al-Quwa Al-Jawiya		
1996–1997	Al-Karkh		
1997–2000	Al-Shorta		
2000–2003	Al-Zawra'a		
2003–2006	Al-Karkh		

International career
2000–2002	Iraq	12	(1)
- * Club domestic league appearances and goals

Ziyad Tariq Aziz Brisam is a former Iraqi footballer who played as a defender for Al-Quwa Al-Jawiya, Al-Karkh, Al-Shorta and Al-Zawra'a. He also played for the Iraq national team.

Ziyad played in Al-Zawraa's 2000 Asian Cup Winners' Cup trail, and also came to the attention to a number of top Asian clubs in Al Zawraa's run to the 2000 Asian Cup Winners Cup' Final.

The defender, who like his father former Aliyat Al-Shurta player Tariq Aziz started out as a striker before he was switched to defence by coach Adnan Dirjal, while at Al-Quwa Al-Jawiya in 1993. He retired in 2006.
