= Jassim Mohammed Haji =

Iraqi footballer

Personal information
- Full name: Jassim Mohammed Haji
- Date of birth: 3 May 1984 (age 42)
- Place of birth: Duhok, Iraq
- Height: 1.90 m (6 ft 3 in)
- Positions: Defender; full back

Team information
- Current team: Duhok

Senior career*
Years	Team	Apps	(Gls)
2001–2013	Duhok		(19)
2013–2017	Zakho FC		(4)
2017–	Duhok		
Total			(23)

International career^{‡}
2002–2008	Iraq	26	(0)
2014	Kurdistan		

Managerial career
- 2018-2023: Duhok (sporting director)
- * Club domestic league appearances and goals as of 21 April 2007 ‡ National team caps and goals as of 21 March 2008

Jassim Mohammed Haji (Arabic: جاسم محمد حاجي, Kurdish: Casim Mihemed Hecî; born 3 May 1984) is an Iraqi footballer who plays as a defender for Iraqi club Duhok.

He is formerly a member of the Iraq national team.

== Honours ==
Duhok

- 2009–10 Iraqi Premier League: Champions

Iraq

- 2006 Asian Games Silver medallist.

== International goals ==
Scores and results list Kurdistan goal tally first, score column indicates score after each Haji goal

List of international goals scored by Jassim Mohammed Haji
No.	Date	Venue	Opponent	Score	Result	Competition
1	2 June 2016	Dinamo Stadium, Sukhumi, Abkhazia	Padania	2–1	2–2	2016 ConIFA World Football Cup
