= Al-Hindiya SC =

Iraqi football club

- Full name: Al-Hindiya Sport Club
- Founded: 1967; 59 years ago
- Ground: Al-Hindiya Stadium
- Chairman: Asaad Abdul-Amir Al-Tufaili
- Manager: Faeq Abdul-Ilah
- League: Iraqi Second Division League
- 2025–26: Iraqi Third Division League, 2nd (promoted)
Home colours	Away colours

Al-Hindiya Sport Club (Arabic: نادي الهندية الرياضي), is an Iraqi football team based in Al-Hindiya District, Karbala, that plays in the Iraqi Second Division League.

== History ==
=== in Premier League ===
Al-Hindiya played in the Iraqi Premier League for the first time in the 2009–10 season, and finished 11th in Group 1, won 7 matches, drew 13 and lost 13, and was able to continue playing in the Premier League for a second season. In the following season, 2010–11, the team was very bad, as it finished the season bottom of the standings in Group 2, after winning only 2 matches, drawing 4 and losing 20, and relegated to the Iraqi First Division League.

== Managerial history ==
- (Iraq) Rajih Mohammed
- (Iraq) Maitham Dael-Haq
- (Iraq) Fouad Jawad
- (Iraq) Amir Abdul-Hussein
- (Iraq) Faeq Abdul-Ilah

== See also ==
- 2020–21 Iraq FA Cup
