= Saad Nasser =

Iraqi footballer

Personal information
- Full name: Saad Nasser Jamil
- Date of birth: 12 November 1973 (age 52)
- Place of birth: Iraq
- Position: Goalkeeper

Senior career*
Years	Team	Apps	(Gls)
1989–1991	Al-Naser		
1991–1997	Al-Ramadi FC		
1997–2000	Al-Zawra'a SC		
2000–2004	Al-Talaba SC		
2004–2005	Asmant Asyut		
2005–2006	El Koroum SC		
2006–2007	Olympic Club		
2007–2008	Telephonat Beni Suef SC		

International career
1995–1996	Iraq U23		
1999–2004	Iraq		

Managerial career
- 2021–2021: Al-Talaba SC (goalkeeper coach)
- * Club domestic league appearances and goals

Saad Nasser (born 12 November 1973) is a former Iraqi football goalkeeper who played for Iraq in the 2002 WAFF Championship. He played for the national team between 1999 and 2004.
