= Sina Moridi =

Iranian footballer

Personal information
- Full name: Sina Moridi
- Date of birth: May 5, 1996 (age 30)
- Place of birth: Dezful, Iran
- Height: 1.84 m (6 ft 0 in)
- Positions: Left back; midfielder

Team information
- Current team: Duhok
- Number: 15

Youth career
- 2013–: Foolad

Senior career*
Years	Team	Apps	(Gls)
2015–2026	Foolad	150	(3)
2021	→ Saipa (loan)	11	(0)
2022–2023	→ Sanat Naft (loan)	9	(0)
2026–	Duhok	5	(0)
- * Club domestic league appearances and goals as of 10 May 2015

Sina Moridi (Persian: سینا مریدی; born May 5, 1996) is an Iranian football midfielder who plays for Duhok in the Iraqi Stars League.

== Club career ==
=== Foolad ===
He started his career with Foolad from youth levels. In winter 2015 he joined the first team by Dragan Skočić and signed a three-and-a-half-year contract which keeps him at Foolad until 2018. He made his debut for Foolad on May 5, 2015, against Padideh as a substitute for Bahman Kamel.

== Career statistics ==
=== Club ===
As of 4 December 2019

Club	Division	Season	League		Hazfi Cup		Asia		Total	
Club	Division	Season	Apps	Goals	Apps	Goals	Apps	Goals	Apps	Goals
Foolad	Pro League	2015–16	3	0	0	0	–	–	3	0
Foolad	Pro League	2016–17	16	0	1	0	–	–	17	0
Foolad	Pro League	2017–18	22	0	2	0	–	–	24	0
Foolad	Pro League	2018–19	24	2	3	0	–	–	27	2
Foolad	Pro League	2019–20	4	0	0	0	–	–	4	0
Foolad	Total		69	2	6	0	0	0	75	2
Saipa	Persian Gulf Pro League	2020-21	11	0	0	0	0	0	11	0
Foolad	Persian Gulf Pro League	2021-22	3	0	0	0	6	0	9	0
Sanat	Persian Gulf Pro League	2022-23	9	0	1	0	0	0	10	0
Foolad	Persian Gulf Pro League	2022-23	11	0	0	0	0	0	11	0
Foolad	Persian Gulf Pro League	2023-24	15	0	1	0	0	0	16	0
Foolad	Total		26	0	1	0	0	0	27	0
Career totals			118	2	8	0	6	0	132	2
