= Hassan Turki Attiya =

Iraqi footballer

Hassan Turki
Personal information
- Full name: Hassan Turki Attiya
- Date of birth: 1 July 1981 (age 45)
- Place of birth: Iraq
- Position: Central midfielder

Senior career*
Years	Team	Apps	(Gls)
1997–1998	Al-Karkh SC		
1998–1999	Al-Kadhimiya		
1999–2000	Duhok SC		
2000–2005	Al-Talaba		
2005–2007	Al-Ahli		
2007–2008	Al Hussein Irbid		
2008	Al Hala SC		
2008–2009	Al-Talaba		
2009–2010	Al-Zawra'a		
2010–2012	Amanat Baghdad		
2012–2013	Sulaymaniyah FC		

International career
2001–2004	Iraq	16	(0)
- * Club domestic league appearances and goals

Hassan Turki Attiya (Arabic: حَسَّان تُرْكِيّ عَطِيَّة; born 1 July 1981, in Iraq) is an Iraqi football midfielder formerly playing for the Sulaymaniyah FC football club in Iraq.

Hassan Turki was captain of the youth team that won the 2000 Asian Youth Championship in Tehran.

He was also one of 10 youth players brought into the 2002 World Cup qualifying squad by Milan Zivadinovic, making his debut as a half-time substitute in the 0–0 draw against Lebanon on 31 January 2001. After Milan was sacked and Adnan Hamad was appointed coach, he was one of only three youth players left in the squad.
