= Hussam Ibrahim =

Iraqi footballer

Hussam Ibrahim Al-Sarray
Personal information
- Date of birth: 10 May 1987 (age 39)
- Place of birth: Basra, Iraq
- Height: 1.88 m (6 ft 2 in)
- Positions: Striker; second striker

Senior career*
Years	Team	Apps	(Gls)
2004–2005	Basra FC		
2005–2007	Al-Minaa		(6)
2007–2008	Duhok FC		
2008–2009	Naft Al-Janoob		
2009–2011	Al-Minaa		(23)
2011–2012	Al-Shorta		(5)
2012	Baghdad FC		
2013	Al-Quwa Al-Jawiya		
2014–2015	Al Masafi		
2015–2017	Al-Kahrabaa		
2017	Al-Minaa	10	(2)
2017–2019	Al-Bahri		
2019	Al-Samawa		

International career^{‡}
2012–2013	Iraq	9	(1)
- * Club domestic league appearances and goals as of June 20, 2017 ‡ National team caps and goals as of January 12, 2013

Hussam Ibrahim Ali Al-Sarray (Arabic: حُسَام إِبْرَاهِيم عَلِيّ السَّرَاي, born 10 May 1987 in Basra) is an Iraqi footballer who plays as a striker.

== International debut ==
On November 7, 2012, Hussam Ibrahim made his debut with Iraq against Qatar in not fully international match, scoring his first goal in the 90th minute of the game which ended 1-2 for Qatar.

On November 14, 2012, Hussam Ibrahim made his fully international debut against Jordan in the 2014 FIFA World Cup qualification as a starter, which ended 1-0 for Iraq.

=== International goals ===
Scores and results list Iraq's goal tally first.

No	Date	Venue	Opponent	Score	Result	Competition
1.	7 November 2012	Jassim Bin Hamad Stadium, Doha, Qatar	Qatar	1–2	1–2	Friendly

== Honors ==
=== International ===
Iraq National football team

- 2012 WAFF Championship: runner-up
- 21st Arabian Gulf Cup: runner-up
