= Muayad Khalid =

Iraqi footballer

Personal information
- Full name: Muayad Khalid Salim Al-Khimisawee
- Place of birth: Baghdad, Iraq
- Height: 1.80 m (5 ft 11 in)
- Position: Right-back

Senior career*
| Years | Team | Apps | (Gls) |
| 2001–2005 | Al-Talaba | | |
| 2005–2010 | Al-Quwa Al-Jawiya | | |
| 2010–2011 | Al-Talaba | | |
| 2011–2015 | Al-Zawraa | | |
| 2015–2017 | Al-Nahda | | |
| 2017–2018 | Mauerwerk S.A. | | |
| 2018–2019 | Brothers Union | | |

International career
| 2006 | Iraq U23 | 7 | (?) |
| 2005–2009 | Iraq | 4 | (0) |
- * Club domestic league appearances and goals

Muayad Khalid (Arabic: مؤيد خالد) is an Iraqi former professional footballer who played as a right-back.

== Career ==
Born in Baghdad, Khalid was spotted by an Al Talaba scout and began playing for the local giants as a teenager. He later moved on to Al Quwa Al Jawiya in 2005, where he has played a key role in defence. He then moved back to Al Talaba and then to Al Zawraa. In September 2011, he signed a contract with his current club Al Zawraa.

In 2016, he was playing football in Vienna.

Having excelled as a right-back for major Iraqi clubs such as Al Talaba and Al Quwa Al Jawiya, Moaayed Khlalid earned a call-up from Iraq's former interim coach Radhi Shenaishil in 2009.

The previous highlight for Khlalid at international level had been featuring in Iraq's silver-winning campaign in the 2006 Asian Games at Doha. In 2009 Moaayed was called up for the Iraqi national team squad by Bora Milutinović to compete in the confederations cup. He played well against world champion Spain in a match that Iraq lost 1–0.

== Honours ==
Al-Talaba

- Iraq FA Cup: 2001–02, 2002–03
- Iraqi Elite League: 2001–02
- Iraqi Perseverance Cup: 2002

Al-Zawraa

- Iraqi Elite League: 2010–11

Iraq

- 2006 Asian Games Silver medalist
