= Al-Hasanain SC =

Iraqi football club

- Full name: Al-Hasanain Sport Club
- Founded: 1994; 32 years ago
- Ground: Al-Hasanain Stadium
- Chairman: Ahmed Ali
- Manager: Firas Jaafar
- League: Iraqi Third Division League
| Home colours | Away colours |

Al-Hasanain Sport Club (Arabic: نادي الحسنين الرياضي), is an Iraqi football team based in Sadr City, Baghdad.

== History ==
=== in Premier League ===
Al-Hasanain played in the Iraqi Premier League for the first time in the 2009–10 season, and finished 13th in Group 2, won 9 matches, drew 11 and lost 14, and was able to continue playing in the Premier League for a second season. In the following season, 2010–11, the team was very bad, as it finished the season second from bottom of the standings in Group 2, after winning only 3 matches, drawing 4 and losing 19, and relegated to the Iraqi First Division League.

== Managerial history ==
- (Iraq) Ahmed Daham
- (Iraq) Firas Jaafar
