= Osama Ali =

Iraqi footballer

Personal information
- Full name: Osama Ali Mohammed
- Date of birth: 25 June 1988 (age 38)
- Place of birth: Iraq
- Height: 1.77 m (5 ft 10 in)
- Position: Central midfielder

Team information
- Current team: Al-Minaa
- Number: 4

Senior career*
Years	Team	Apps	(Gls)
2005–2007	Al-Talaba		
2007–2008	Erbil SC		
2008–2009	Al-Talaba		
2009–2011	Al-Zawraa		
2011–2014	Dohuk FC		
2014–2015	Al-Talaba		
2015–2017	Al-Quwa Al-Jawiya		
2017–2018	Al-Minaa	22	(0)

International career^{‡}
2013	Iraq	5	(0)
- * Club domestic league appearances and goals as of 12 June 2018 ‡ National team caps and goals as of 24 August 2016

Osama Ali Mohammed (Arabic: أُسَامَة عَلِيّ مُحَمَّد; born 25 June 1988) is an Iraqi midfielder who plays with Al-Minaa in Iraq, and for the Iraq national football team.

== National team debut ==
On 27 May 2013, he made his debut for Iraq's national team against Liberia; Iraq lost 1–0.

== Honours ==
=== Club ===
Erbil SC

- 2007–08 Iraqi Premier League: Champion

Al-Zawraa

- 2010–11 Iraqi Premier League: Champion

Al-Quwa Al-Jawiya

- AFC Cup
  - 2016 Winner
- Iraq FA Cup
  - 2015–16 Winner
- Iraqi Premier League:
  - 16-17 Winner

=== International ===
Iraq national football team

- 2006 Asian Games Silver medallist
