= Oday Taleb =

Iraqi footballer

Oday Talib
Personal information
- Full name: Oday Talib Jawad
- Date of birth: 1 July 1981 (age 45)
- Place of birth: Iraq
- Height: 1.86 m (6 ft 1 in)
- Position: Goalkeeper

Team information
- Current team: Goalkeeping Coach for Al-Minaa Club (2026-2027)
- Number: 21

Senior career*
Years	Team	Apps	(Gls)
2002–2003	Al-Shorta		
2003–2006	Al-Zawraa		
2006–2008	Al-Minaa		
2008–2015	Duhok		
2015–2022	Naft Al-Basra		
2022	retired		

International career^{‡}
2002–2004	Iraq	5	(0)
- * Club domestic league appearances and goals as of N/A ‡ National team caps and goals as of 8 September 2004

Oday Talib (Arabic: عدي طالب) (born 1 July 1981 in Iraq) is a former Iraqi goalkeeper. He last played for Naft Al-Basra.

== Coaching career ==
Oday Taleb retired from professional football following the 2021–22 season with Naft Al-Basra SC. Shortly after his retirement, he transitioned into goalkeeping coaching.

He began his managerial career as the first-team goalkeeping coach for Al-Bahri SC across the 2022–23 and 2023–24 seasons. For the 2024–25 season, he served as the goalkeeping coach for Naft Al-Wasat SC in the Iraqi Premier League.

During the 2025–26 season, Taleb spent the first half as the goalkeeping coach for Naft Al-Basra before joining Al-Minaa SC for the second half of the season in the Iraqi Stars League. He continued his role with Al-Minaa for the 2026–27 season.

== Career ==
Talib began his career with Al-Shorta in 2002 before earning a move the following season to Baghdad-based team Al-Zawraa. After spending three years there, Talib went on to play for Al-Minaa before being signed by his current club, Duhok, an Iraqi-Kurdish outfit based in Dohuk.

Talib served as back-up to goalkeeper Noor Sabri throughout Iraq's run to the semi-finals of the Men's Olympic Football Tournament at Athens 2004.

== Honours ==
Iraq U23

- Summer Olympics fourth place: 2004
- West Asian Games gold medal: 2005
