= Qusay Hashim =

Iraqi association football player

Personal information
- Full name: Qusay Hashim Saleh
- Date of birth: 1 July 1976 (age 50)
- Place of birth: Iraq
- Position: Forward

Team information
- Current team: Iraq U16 (Assist. Manager)

International career
| Years | Team | Apps | (Gls) |
| 2002–2004 | Iraq | 16 | (3) |

Managerial career
- 2013: Al-Talaba (Assist. coach)
- 2013–2014: Al-Kahrabaa (Assist. coach)
- 2015–2016: Iraq U20 (Assist. coach)
- 2016–2018: Al-Kahrabaa (Assist. coach)
- 2018–2021: Al-Kahrabaa (Assist. coach)
- 2021–: Iraq U16 (Assist. Manager)

Qusay Hashim Saleh (Arabic: قُصَيّ هَاشِم صَالِح; born 1 July 1976) is a former Iraqi football forward who played for Iraq between 2002 and 2004. He played 16 matches and scored 3 goals.

== Career statistics ==
=== International goals ===
Scores and results list Iraq's goal tally first.

| No | Date | Venue | Opponent | Score | Result | Competition |
|---|---|---|---|---|---|---|
| 1. | 19 July 2002 | Al-Shaab Stadium, Baghdad | Syria | 2–0 | 2–0 | Friendly |
| 2. | 26 August 2003 | King Abdullah Stadium, Amman | Jordan | 1–2 | 1–2 | Friendly |
| 3. | 20 October 2003 | Bahrain National Stadium, Manama | Malaysia | 1–0 | 5–1 | 2004 AFC Asian Cup qualification |
