= New Sirwan SC =

Iraqi football club

New Sirwan
- Full name: New Sirwan Sports Club
- Founded: 1970; 56 years ago
- Stadium: Sirwani Nwe
- Capacity: 5,000
- Owner: Awat Janab Noori
- Chairman: Awat Janab Noori
- Manager: Rzgar ali
- League: Iraqi Third Division League
- 2024–25: Iraqi Third Division League, 2nd
Home colours	Away colours

New Sirwan Sports Club also written (Arabic: سيروان, Kurdish: یانه‌ی وه‌رزشی سيروانی نوێ) is a sports club based in Sulaymaniyah, Kurdistan Region, Iraq. Sirwan is Kurdish for "Roaring Sea". They currently play in the Iraqi Third Division League.
