= Khalid Mushir =

Iraqi footballer (born 1981)

Personal information
- Full name: Khalid Mushir Ismael Agha
- Date of birth: 14 February 1981 (age 45)
- Place of birth: Duhok, Iraq
- Positions: Defensive midfielder; defender

Senior career*
Years	Team	Apps	(Gls)
2000–2002	Al-Mosul SC		
2002–2004	Erbil SC		
2004–2013	Duhok SC		
2013–2014	Zakho SC		
2015	Duhok SC		

International career^{‡}
2005–2010	Iraq	24	(0)
2012	Iraqi Kurdistan	4	(1)
- * Club domestic league appearances and goals ‡ National team caps and goals as of 1 October 2010

Khalid Mushir Ismael (Arabic: خَالِد مُشِيْر إسمَاعِيْل, Kurdish: Xalid Muşîr Ismaîl; born 14 February 1981) is an Iraqi footballer who plays as a midfielder for Duhok SC in Iraq and the Iraq national football team. He usually plays as defensive midfielder, but has recently played in a central defender role. Khalid moved to Zakho FC on 14 September 2013.
