= Sabah Jeayer =

Iraqi footballer

Personal information
- Full name: Sabah Jeayer Khalaf
- Date of birth: 26 May 1970 (age 56)
- Place of birth: Iraq
- Position: Forward

Senior career*
Years	Team	Apps	(Gls)
	Al-Talaba SC	-	(–)
	Al-Quwa Al-Jawiya	-	(–)
	Al-Talaba SC	-	(–)
	Al-Quwa Al-Jawiya	-	(–)

International career
1992–2001	Iraq	21	(4)
- * Club domestic league appearances and goals

Sabah Jeayer (born 26 May 1970) is an Iraqi football forward who played for Iraq in the 2000 Asian Cup, Talaba SC, and Al-Quwa Al-Jawiya.

Sabah Jeayer was an Iraqi forward who scored two goals at the 2000 Asian Cup.

He started his career with the Talaba SC youth team in 1986, before moving to Air Force club Al-Quwa Al-Jawiya in 1991 and then moving back to Al-Talaba in 1993. He was given his first call-up to the national team in 1992.

In 1995, he helped Talaba to the Asian Cup Winners Cup final and scored 14 goals to help Al-Quwa Al-Jawiya win the double in 1997.

He was a member of Iraq's disastrous World Cup qualifying campaign for France'98, but stormed back after three years in exile with a magnificent double over hosts Lebanon in the Asian Cup. He was recalled by Milan Zivadinovic, who called him his secret weapon, Sabah has become one of Iraq’s star players.

The trickle of goals, he has scored during his career were always celebrated with an acrobatic somersault.

== International goals ==
Scores and results list Iraq's goal tally first.

#	Date	Venue	Opponent	Score	Result	Competition
1.	15 October 2000	Sports City Stadium, Beirut	Lebanon	1–0	2–2	2000 AFC Asian Cup
2.	15 October 2000	Sports City Stadium, Beirut	Lebanon	2–2	2–2	2000 AFC Asian Cup
3.	12 April 2001	Al-Shaab Stadium, Baghdad	Macau	5–0	8–0	2002 FIFA World Cup qualification
4.	12 April 2001	Al-Shaab Stadium, Baghdad	Macau	7–0	8–0	2002 FIFA World Cup qualification
