= Al-Ramadi SC =

Iraqi football club

Al Ramadi
- Full name: Al Ramadi Sport Club
- Nicknames: Ghizlan Al-Gharbiya (Western Deers)
- Founded: 1966; 60 years ago as Al-Nasr
- Ground: Al-Ramadi Stadium
- Capacity: 10,000
- Chairman: Ibrahim Al-Ausaj
- Manager: Safwan Abdul-Ghani
- League: Iraqi Premier Division League
- 2025–26: Iraqi Premier Division League, 10th of 20
Home colours	Away colours

Al-Ramadi Sport Club (Arabic: نادي الرمادي الرياضي), is an Iraqi football team based in Ramadi, Al-Anbar, that plays in Iraqi Premier Division League.

== History ==
=== Founding and name ===
The Club was established in 1966 under the name Al-Nasr Club, and in 1992 it was changed to the name Al-Ramadi Club.

=== In Premier League, overview ===
Al-Ramadi team played in the Iraqi Premier League for 14 seasons, as it started playing for the first time in the 1988–89 season, and its last season in the league was the 2010–11 season, and the best position it got was the fourth place in the 1995–96 season.

=== Al-Nasr wal-Salam Cup ===
In the 1995–96 season Al-Ramadi team won the Al-Nasr wal-Salam Cup, beating Al-Quwa Al-Jawiya 1–0 with a goal by Zuhair Abdul-Ridha, beating Al-Shorta 5–4 on penalties and then beating Al-Naft 3–0 in the final.

== Stadium ==
After ISIS occupied Al-Anbar, in 2015 they blew up the Al-Ramadi Stadium, and after the liberation of Al-Anbar in 2017, the Ministry of Youth and Sports rehabilitated the stadium in 2021.

== Club Awards ==
Since the 2023-24 season the club has been holding annual events to award player and

=== Player of the year ===
Player	Position	Season
(Iraq) Siraj Al-Dein Sabah	Midfielder	2023-2024

=== Young Player of the year ===
Player	Position	Season
(Iraq) Qais Rasheed	Forward	2023-2024

== Managerial history ==
- (Iraq) Sabah Abdul-Hassan
- (Iraq) Ahmed Daham
- (Iraq) Khamis Humoud
- (Iraq) Haider Jabbar
- (Iraq) Khalid Mohammed Sabbar
- (Iraq) Thair Jassam
- (Iraq) Mohammed Hammad
- (Iraq) Sadeq Hanoon
- (Iraq) Jumaa Jadeea
- (Iraq) Shaker Mahmoud
- (Iraq) Safwan Abdul-Ghani

== Famous players ==
- (Iraq) Ahmed Hussein
- (Iraq) Amer Mushraf
- (Iraq) Ammar Ahmad
- (Iraq) Husham Mohammed
- (Iraq) Khalid Mohammed Sabbar
- (Iraq) Mohammed Hammad
- (Iraq) Mohammed Hameed
- (Iraq) Saad Nasser
- (Iraq) Walid Khalid
- (Liberia) William Jebor

== See also ==
- 2021–22 Iraq FA Cup
- 2022–23 Iraq FA Cup
