= Duhok Stadium =

Stadium in Duhok, Kurdistan Region, Iraq

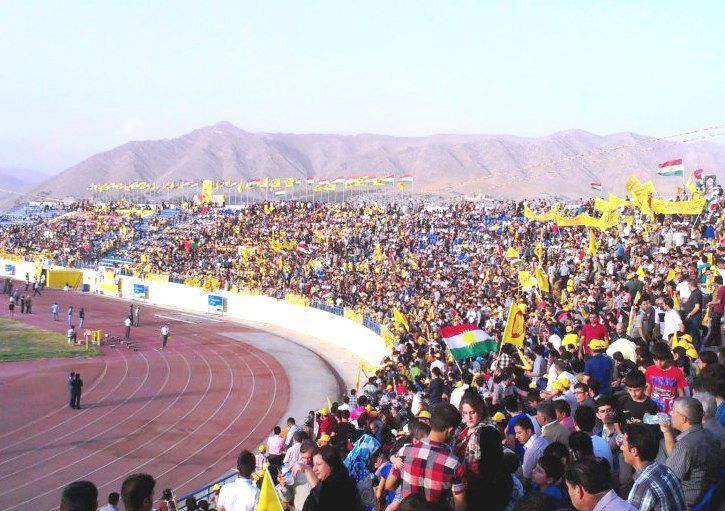
- Interactive map of Duhok Stadium
- Full name: Duhok Stadium
- Coordinates: 36°51′07″N 42°59′46″E
- Operator: Duhok SC
- Capacity: 22,800
- Surface: Grass
- Field size: 105 m × 68 m

Duhok Stadium (Kurdish: یاریگای دهۆک) (Arabic: ملعب دهوك) is a multi-purpose stadium in Dohuk, Kurdistan Region, Iraq. It is currently used mostly for football matches and serves as the home stadium of Duhok SC which plays in the Iraqi Premier League. The stadium has a capacity of 22,800.

== See also ==
- List of football stadiums in Iraq
