= Duhok SC =

Iraqi association football club

- Full name: Duhok Sports Club
- Nickname: Mountain Hawks (صقور الجبال) (ئەلھۆیێن چیا)
- Founded: 1970; 56 years ago
- Ground: Duhok Stadium
- Capacity: 22,800
- Chairman: Abdullah Jalal
- Manager: Sulaiman Ramadhan
- League: Iraq Stars League
- 2025–26: Iraq Stars League, 10th of 20
- Website: duhoksc.com
Home colours	Away colours

Duhok Sports Club (Kurdish: Yana Dihok ya Werzişî, Arabic: نادي دهوك الرياضي) is an Iraqi professional sports club based in Duhok, Kurdistan Region. Founded in 1970, its football section competes in the Iraq Stars League. Duhok has won the Iraq Stars League and the Iraq FA Cup once each. Duhok became the first Iraqi club to participate in and win the GFF Gulf Club Champions League, having been crowned champions in the 2024–25 season.

== Club history ==
Duhok SC was founded by the youth of Duhok city when three teams joined together to establish the club on 14 December 1970. Duhok began its football journey in rural league competitions until the 1974–75 season, when the club decided to suspend its activities to support the post-nationalistic struggle to defend the rights of the Kurdish people in Iraq. In 1976, Duhok Football Team participated in the Iraqi Third Division, and by 1978, the team had moved up to the Iraqi Second Division. During the 1990–91 season, the team did not participate in the league due to a major uprising. The club resumed participation in the 1992–93 season in the Iraqi Fourth Division, earning promotion to the Third Division a year later. In the 1993–94 season, Duhok SC played in the Third Division and was once again promoted, this time to the Second Division.

During the 1980s, Duhok SC had several talented players, one of the most notable being Wahid Kovli. Around 1985, he emerged as a key striker for the team, known for his goal-scoring abilities and impact on the squad’s performance. His skills made him a feared forward in the league and a crucial player for Duhok SC.

The 1994–95 season was a defining moment for Duhok SC, as they claimed the Second Division title and secured a spot in the Iraqi First Division for the 1995–96 season. Duhok SC remained in the First Division throughout the 1996–97 season. In the 1997–98 season, Duhok SC secured promotion to the Iraqi Premier League by winning the First Division. Since then, the club spent many years in mid-table, occasionally challenging the top Iraqi teams. However, everything changed after the 2003 invasion of Iraq, which brought new opportunities and freedom for Kurdish sports teams and athletes, allowing them to excel in both national and international competitions. During the 2009–10 season when they won their first-ever Iraqi Premier League championship, defeating Talaba SC 1–0 to claim the title. In the 2011–12 season, Duhok SC finished as runners-up, qualifying for the AFC Cup for the second time in its history. The first time Duhok SC played in the AFC Cup was in the 2010–11 season, where they reached the quarter-finals.

== Stadium ==
Duhok Stadium originally held 10,000 people, but after reconstruction it holds 25,000. It was built in 1992.

== Rivalries ==
Duhok FC identifies Zakho SC and Erbil SC as rivals. The matches between Duhok and Zakho are referred to as the "Badinan Derby".

== Crest ==
Duhok SC logo features the club's primary colors, yellow and blue. It depicts a hawk, symbolizing the club's nickname, "Mountains' Hawks" (صقور الجبال)(ئەلھۆیێن چیا). The logo also includes the letters "DSC" at the top, representing Duhok Sports Club, and displays the year of the club's founding at the bottom.

== Kit history ==
Early kit worn during 1970s
Kit from 1979
First use of yellow in 1980
Green strip 1991
Kit from 2000s
First AFC Cup kit
Kits from 2022 and 2023

== Current squad ==
As of 14 August 2026

No.	Pos.	Nat.	Player	Notes
Goalkeepers
1	GK	(Iraq)	San Mustafa	
12	GK	(Iraq)	Ahmed Bashar	
21	GK	(Iraq)	Zana Jawzal	
22	GK	(Iraq)	Awad Azad	
34	GK	(Iraq)	Kumel Al-Rekabe	
Defenders
2	DF	(Iraq)	Manaf Younis	
3	DF	(Iraq)	Josef Al-Imam	
13	DF	(Brazil)	Raykar	
27	DF	(Iraq)	Bayar Abubakir	Vice-Captain
99	DF	(Iraq)	Siyabend Ageed	Captain
Midfielders	DF			
5	MF	(Iraq)	Ahmed Alieé	
8	MF	(Iraq)	Rewan Amin	
10	MF	(Iraq)	Hady Saleh Karim	
15	MF	(Iran)	Sina Moridi	
17	MF	(Iraq)	Hassan Emad	
24	MF	(Iraq)	Karsan Doski	
26	MF	(Iraq)	Mustafa Nawaf	
35	MF	(Iraq)	Safaa Hadi	
88	MF	(Iran)	Sina Asadbeigi	
Forwards
7	FW	(Syria)	Mahmoud Al-Mawas	
9	FW	(Iraq)	Blnd Hassan	
16	FW	(Iraq)	Zhiyar Ibrahim	
18	FW	(Morocco)	Reda Majji	
19	FW	(Iraq)	Younus Hammood	
20	FW	(Iran)	Mohammad Reza Soleimani	
25	FW	(Iraq)	Aso Rostam	
77	FW	(Brazil)	Igor Henrique	

=== Technical staff ===
Position	Name	Nationality
Head coach	Sulaiman Ramadhan	(Iraq)
Assistant coach		
Assistant coach		

== Club managers ==
- (Iran) Yahya Golmohammadi (2026)
- (Iraq) Ahmed Khalaf (2026–2026; 2023–2024)
- (Iraq) Abdul-Ghani Shahad (2025–2026)
- (Brazil) Sérgio Farias (2025)
- (Sweden) Amir Azrafshan (2025)
- (Iraq) Sulaiman Ramadhan (2025; 2020–2023)
- (Sweden) Mesut Meral (2024–2025)
- (Iraq) Thair Jassam (2015–2016)
- (Iraq) Basim Qasim (2014–2015; 2007–2011)
- (Syria) Fajr Ibrahim (2013–2014)
- (Iraq) Jamal Ali (2012–2013)
- (Syria) Ayman Hakeem (2011–2012)
- (Iraq) Akram Salman (2010–2011)
- (Iraq) Nadhim Shaker (2004–2005; 1996–1997)
- (Iraq) Namat Mahmoud
- (Iraq) Hamid Mahmoud
- (Iraq) Hussain Hassan
- (Iraq) Ameer Abdul-Aziz
- (Iraq) Rasan Bunian
- (Iraq) Hadi Mutansh
- (Iraq) Mohammed Tabra
- (Iraq) Natiq Hashim
- (Iraq) Faisal Aziz
- (Iraq) Shaker Mahmoud
- (Iraq) Kadhim Mutashar

== Recent history ==
Season	Pos.	Pl.	W	D	L	GS	GA	P	AFCCL	AFCC	FA Cup	Notes
2000–01	5	30	16	7	7	44	24	55				
2001–02	7	38	19	13	6	61	38	70			Round 1	
2002–03	—	27	9	7	11	30	40	34			Round 3	League abandoned
2003–04	—	7	4	0	3	10	6					League abandoned
2004–05	2nd round	20	9	6	5	25	16					
2005–06	2nd round	16	6	6	4	13	10					
2006–07	2nd round	17	6	6	5	18	21					
2007–08	4th place	24	14	6	4	22	13					
2008–09	3rd place	27	19	7	1	48	11					
2009–10	1	42	26	8	8	71	29					
2010–11	1st round	26	12	4	10	36	28			Quarter-finals		
2011–12	2	38	21	13	4	57	21	76				
2012–13	5	34	16	10	8	54	35	58		Round of 16	Abandoned	
2013–14	7	23	7	10	6	30	32	31				
2014–15	2nd round	22	6	8	8	22	28					
2015–16	Relegated	9	2	1	6	8	15				Semi-finals	

- From 2004, the competition changed from league system to various rounds including table and knockout rounds.
- From 2011, the competition went back to the single league system.
- From 2014, the competition returned to a system with various rounds.

== Board positions ==
Position	Name	Nationality
Chairman	Abdullah Jalal	(Iraq)
Secretary	Jassim Mohammed Haji	(Iraq)
Director	Khalid Mushir	(Iraq)

== Honours ==
Type	Competition	Titles	Seasons
Domestic	Iraq Stars League	1	2009–10
Domestic	Iraq FA Cup	1	2024–25
Domestic	Iraqi Premier Division League (second tier)	1	1997–98
Domestic	Iraqi First Division League (third tier)	1	1994–95
Domestic (regional)	Kurdistan Premier League	1	2006–07
International	GFF Gulf Club Champions League	1	2024–25

== Performance in international competitions ==
- AFC Cup: 2 appearances

2011: Quarter-finals
2013: Round of 16

- GFF Gulf Club Champions League: 1 appearance

2024–25: Winners

== See also ==
- Football in Iraq
- Iraq Stars League
