= List of Girls und Panzer books =

The first volume of Girls und Panzer manga series featuring (L-R) Yukari Akiyama, Hana Isuzu, Saori Takebe, Miho Nishizumi, and Mako Reizei

Girls und Panzer is a 2012 original Japanese animated television series produced by Actas. Directed by Tsutomu Mizushima and written by Reiko Yoshida, the series is set in a timeline where girls' high schools compete in a sport involving tanks called sensha-dō (戦車道, the way of the tank). Girls und Panzer has been adapted into several books such as manga, light novels, and mooks.

== Manga ==
=== Girls und Panzer ===
No.	Original release date	Original ISBN	English release date	English ISBN
01	September 21, 2012	978-4-0406-7568-8	June 3, 2014	978-1-626920-56-9
1. "Our Tankery (Part 1)" (わたしの戦車道 その1); 2. "Our Tankery (Part 2)" (わたしの戦車道 その2); 3. "I'll Do It! Practice Match!!" (やります！練習試合!!); 4. "So Strong! St. Gloriana Girls' College!!" (強いです！聖グロリアーナ女学院!!)
02	February 23, 2013	978-4-0406-7569-5	September 23, 2014	978-1-626920-64-4
5. "Regroup! Operation More Sneak Around!!" (起死回生！もっとこそこそ作戦!!); 6. "It Begins! The Nationals!!" (始まってます！全国大会!!); 7. "Second Match! It's Anzio High School!!" (2回戦！アンツィオ高校です!!); 8. "Mountain Pass! Fierce Combat!!" (峠です！激闘です!!); 9. "Second Match! It's Settled!!" (2回戦！決着です!!)
03	September 21, 2013	978-4-0406-8263-1	January 6, 2015	978-1-626921-01-6
10. "Gearing Up for the Semi-finals!!" (準決勝直前ですっ!!); 11. "Pravda Semi-finals Battle! It's Beginning!!" (準決勝プラウダ戦！開始ですっ!!); 12. "A Desperate Situation! A Great Pinch!!" (絶体絶命！大ピンチですっ!!); 13. "Captain! We'll Dance!!" (隊長！踊りますっ!!); 14. "Pravda Battle! The Conclusion!!" (プラウダ戦！決着ですっ!!)
04	April 23, 2014	978-4-0406-6548-1	June 9, 2015	978-1-626921-53-5
15. "New Members! Almost Time for the Finals!!" (新メンバー！決勝戦直前ですっ!!); 16. "It Came! The Fuji Training Grounds!!" (第16話 来ました！東富士演習場っ!!); 17. "Kuromorimine's Blitzkrieg! In a Pinch All of a Sudden!!" (黒森峰電撃戦！いきなりピンチですっ!!); 18. "A Fierce Fight! Point 207!!" (激闘です！二〇七地点っ!!); 19. "The Freshmen!! Big Trouble!!" (1年生！大変ですっ!!); 20. "An Iron Wall! The Land Fortress Maus!!" (鉄壁です！陸の要塞マウス!!); Final. "This Is Our Tankery!!" (これがわたし達の戦車道!!)

=== Girls und Panzer: Little Army ===
No.	Original release date	Original ISBN	English release date	English ISBN
01	October 23, 2012	978-4-0406-7872-6	December 16, 2014	978-1-626920-92-7
Chapters 1–4
02	February 23, 2013	978-4-0406-7873-3	March 10, 2015	978-1-626921-18-4
Prologue; Chapters 5–8

=== Girls und Panzer: Comic Anthology ===
No.	Japanese release date	Japanese ISBN
01	October 23, 2013	978-4-0406-8262-4
Girls und Panzer in Villers-Bocage (ガールズ&パンツァーinヴィレル・ボカージュ); Operation "Hot and Steamy"! (ほっかほか作戦です！); Daily Life in Ōarai (大洗の日常); Elder Sisters Are Always at a Disadvantage. (長女はいつだって損な役なのだ。); Interaction; Miho Diary (みほ日記); Reizei's One Morning (ある朝の冷泉さん); The Way of Maintenance (整備道); Clash of the Baliboman! Save the Club from Disbandment! Volume (激突バリボーマン！廃部の危機を救え！の巻); Dangerous Relations ①② (危険な関係①②); Charging In!! The Yukari Scoop (突撃!! ゆかりスクープ); One Step Forward (一歩前へ); Girls und Panzer 1966 "Full Charge!! Pivot Turn!" (ガールズ&パンツァー1966 "Full Charge!! Pivot Turn!"); Rabbit Garupan (ウサギのガルパン)
02	November 22, 2014	978-4-0406-6882-6
Erika's Pride (エリカの誇り); This Is a Real Victory Celebration!? (これが本当の祝勝会です!?); Lively Greetings at Sunset (暮れの元気なご挨拶); It's Mama und Panzer! (ママ&パンツァーです！); It's a Tan Tankery! (小麦色の戦車道です！); Duck Team Tankery (アヒルさんチームの戦車道); Krasnaya Nitoka (クラースナヤ・ニートカ); The Inherited Tankery (受け継がれる戦車道)

=== Girls und Panzer: Motto Love Love Sakusen Desu! ===
No.	Japanese release date	Japanese ISBN
01	October 23, 2013	978-4-0406-7561-9
1. "To Start!" (始まります！); 2. "It's Pravda!" (プラウダです！); 2.5. "It's Everyone's Daily Life!" (みんなの日常です！); 3. "It's Summer in Ōarai!" (大洗の夏です！); 4. "It's More Summer in Ōarai!" (もっと大洗の夏です！); 5. "It's the Teatime of Gloriana!" (ティータイムオブグロリアーナです！); Omake; 1. "It's the Web Version Edition!" (WEB出張版です！); 2. "It's the Melancholy of Nina" (ニーナの憂鬱です！)
02	April 23, 2014	978-4-0406-6541-2
6. "It's the Ōarai Girls Countermeasure Meeting!" (大洗女子対策会議です！); 6.5. "It's an Informal Social Gathering!" (親睦会です！); 7. "It's the Autumn Week of Public Morals Control!" (秋の風紀取締り週間です！); 8. "It's Operation Diet!" (ダイエット作戦です！); 9. "It's Christmas!" (クリスマスです！); 10. "It's the Murder Case of Ōarai Girls' 38(t) Loader!" (大洗女子高校38(t)ヘッツァー装填手殺人事件です！); 11. "It's the Noble Sisters' Steamy Trip Chapter!" (ノーブル姉妹湯煙旅情編です！); 12. "We're Lost!" (迷子です！"); Omake; 1. "It's the Web Version Edition! Part 1" (WEB出張版です！その1); 2. "It's the Web Version Edition! Part 2" (WEB出張版です！その2); 3. "It's the Anglerfish Festival War!" (あんこう祭・ウォーです！)
03	October 23, 2014	978-4-0406-6874-1
13. "The Image of Future Expectations!" (未来予想図です！); 13.5. "It's the Nonna Diary!" (ノンナ日記です！); 14. "It's a Nice Day for a Date!" (デート日和です！); 15. "It's Operation Confession!" (告白作戦です！); 16. "It's the Conditions in Anzio!" (第17話 アンツィオ日和です！); 17. "It's the Conditions in Anzio! Sequel" (続・アンツィオ日和です！); 18. "It's Katyusha's Portrait!" (カチューシャの肖像です！); Omake; 1. "It's the Web Version Edition!" (WEB出張版です！); 2. "It's the Web Version Edition! It's the Anzio Special!" (WEB出張版 アンツィオスペシャルです！); 3. "It's the Making-off Love Love Operation!" (メイキングオブらぶらぶ作戦です！); 4. "It's Judgement!" (ジャッジメントです！)
04	May 23, 2015	978-4-0406-7521-3
19. "It's Saunders!" (サンダースです！); 19.5. "It's Christmas in Saunders!" (クリスマス・イン・サンダースです！); 20. "It's Remako's Repay of Gratitude!" (れま子の恩返しです！); 21. "Pinch! It's the Automobile Club!" (ピンチ！自動車部です！); 22. "It's Valentine's, Kuromorimine!" (バレンタイン・黒森峰です！); 23. "It's Winter in Pravda!" (冬のプラウダです！); 24. "It's Giant Araippe vs. Ōarai Tank Company!" (巨大アライッペ対大洗戦車隊です！); Omake; 1. "It's the Web Version Edition!" (WEB出張版です！); 2. "It's the Web Version Edition!" (WEB出張版です！); 3. "Mini Pekoe." (ミニペコ。); 4. "It's the Movie Special: NG Outtakes Collection!" (映像特典：NG場面集です！)
05	November 21, 2015	978-4-0406-7842-9
25. "It's Anchovy, Swim!" (泳げアンチョビ！です！); 26. "It's Retaking the M3!" (M3を取り戻せ一です！); 27. "It's a Visit from Darjeeling!" (ダージリン様ご訪問です！); 28. "It's the Yuzu-Momo Battle...?" (柚子桃合戦...？); 29. "A Cool Midsummer Evening! It's the Ghost Story Meeting!" (真夏の納涼！怪談大会です！); 30. "Run, Type 89!" (奔れ、ハ九式！); Omake; 1. "It's the Web Version Edition!" (WEB出張版です！); 2. "It's the Web Version Edition!" (WEB出張版です！); 3. "Mini Peppa?" (ミニペパ？); 4. "That's It, Madam...!" (奥様それは...!! です！)
06	April 23, 2016	978-4-0406-8256-3
31. "The Rivals are a Treasure!" (ライバルは宝物です！); 32. "Acting Like Me...?" (私らしく...？です！); 33. "Aah, Mother?" (ああっお母様っ？です！); 34. "We Are the Chihatan Girls' Tank Club!" (我ラ知波単少女戦車隊デス！); 35. "It's Midnight, Mika!" (ミッドナイト・ミカです！); 36. "Ah, It's the Mothers' Side?" (ああっお母様方？です！); 37. "It's the Katyusha Diary! Chapter Two" (カチューシャ日記です！〜第二章〜); Omake; 1. "It's the Web Version Edition! Part 1" (WEB出張版です！その1); 2. "It's the Web Version Edition! Part 2" (WEB出張版です！その2); 3. "I Am a Mako" (吾輩はマコである); 4. "Girls und Panzer for Beginners" (初心者のためのガールズ&パンツァー); 5. "It's Judgement! Part 2" (ジャッジメントです！その2)
07	October 22, 2016	978-4-0406-8561-8
39. "It's the Unexpected Chihatan Island!" (ひょっこり知波単島であります！); 40. "It's Tracking Darjeeling!" (追跡・ダージリン様！ですわ); 41. "It's 'We're Together with Boco'!" (ボコといっしょ！です！); 42. "It's the Daily Life of a History Buff Girl!" (歴女の日々です！); 43. "It's Katyusha of the Dead!" (カチューシャ・オブ・ザ・デッドです！); 44. "We Welcome You to Chihatan!" (ようこそ知波単であります！); Omake; 1. "It's the Web Version Edition! Part 1" (WEB出張版です！その1); 2. "It's the Web Version Edition! Part 2" (WEB出張版です！その2); 3. "Attack of Mini-Patcho!" (ミニパッチョ襲来！); 4. "It's That Girl, Again!" (また、あの子です！)
08	April 22, 2017	978-4-0406-9168-8
45. "It's the Crying Bermuda Attack!" (嘆きのバミューダアタックです！); 46. "It's the Melancholy of Chiyomi Anzai!" (安斎千代美の憂鬱です！); 47. "It's Darjeeling's Package!" (ダージリンのおくりものです！); 48. "It's Being Together with Grandma!" (おばあといっしょです！); 49. "It's the Isuzu Student Council!" (五十鈴生徒会です！); 50. "It's the Boco Spa Resort!" (すぱボコリぞーとです！); Omake; 1. "It's the Web Version Edition! Part 1" (WEB出張版です！その1); 2. "It's the Web Version Edition! Part 2" (WEB出張版です！その2); 3. "Alice, Assault!" (強襲！ありす); 4. "It's Operation Shibocho!" (しぱちよ作戦です！)
09	November 22, 2017	978-4-0406-9486-3
51. "It's Erika-curry Day!" (エリカレーの日です！); 51.5. "It's Kuromorimine's Big Break!" (黒森峰ブレイクです！); 52. "It Is the Passion of Rosehip!" (ローズヒップの受難ですわ！); 53. "It's a Close Encounter of the Third Kind!" (未知との遭遇です！); 54. "It's the Twilight of Gods!" (神々の黄昏です！); 55. "It's a Judgement Holiday!" (ジャッジメント・ホリデーです！); 56. "It's Alice in Anzioland!" (愛里寿・イン・アンツィオランドです！); Omake; 1. "It's the Web Version Edition! Part 1" (WEB出張版です！その1); 2. "It's the Web Version Edition! Part 2" (WEB出張版です！その2); 3. "Hips! That's It!" (ヒ〜ップ!! ですわ！); 4. "It's Erika-curry Day Again!" (今日もエリカレーの日です！)
10	May 23, 2018	978-4-0406-9838-0
57. "It's... a Treasure Island?" (宝島...？です！); 57.5. "It's Important to Watch Your Step!" (どん底にご用心です！); 58. "It's Chihatan Manga Monthly!" (月刊漫画チハタンであります！); 59. "It's Klara's Days of Forging Her Body!" (クラーラ、鍛錬の日々です！); 60. "It's the Freedom of the Queen!" (女王様は自由です！); 61. "It's... Marie Forever!" (マリーよ永遠に...です！); 62. "It's the Hippo Team's Operation: Kochi Landings!" (カバさんチーム高知上陸作戦です！); Omake; 1. "It's the Web Version Edition! Part 1" (WEB出張版です！その1); 2. "It's the Web Version Edition! Part 2" (WEB出張版です！その2); 3. "It's the Tea Genie!" (紅茶の精霊さんです！); 4. "It's a Shark's Water Play!" (サメさんの水あそびです！)
11	November 21, 2018	978-4-0406-5179-8
63. "It's the Ōarai Draft!" (大洗ドラフト会議です！); 64. "It's the Assassin from the Ship's Bottom!" (船底からの刺客です！); 65. "Fukuda Is Like a Spring Breeze!" (福田、春の嵐であります！); 66. "It's Operation Escape the Sauna!" (サウナ脱出大作戦です！); 67. "It's a Typhoon at Gloriana!" (台風グロリアーナです！); 68. "It's a Portrait!" (ポートレートです！); Omake; 1. "It's the Web Version Edition! Part 1" (WEB出張版です！その1); 2. "It's the Web Version Edition! Part 2" (WEB出張版です！その2); 3. "It's Her First Errand!" (初めてのおつかいです！); 4. "It's the Middle-aged Ladies Bar!" (バー・オブ・オバァです！); 5. "It's Shark Team's Fun Tonton Zumo! Special Book Appendix" (巻末とくべつ付録 たのしい！サメさんチームトントンずもう!!)
12	August 23, 2019	978-4-0406-5708-0
69. "It's Kawashima Shooting!" (撃て！河嶋！です！); 70. "It's a Dried Potato Crisis!" (干し芋クライシスです！); 71. "It's Hana Isuzu's Student Council Case File!" (五十鈴華の生徒会事件簿です！); 72. "It's Murakami's Makeover!" (変身のムラカミです！); 73. "It's a Celebrity War!" (セレブ・ウォーです！); 74. "It's a Modern Girl's Melancholy!" (モダンガールの憂鬱であります！); 75. "It's the Hippo Team's Operation: Kochi Landings! Ryōma Memorial Museum SOS!" (かばさんチームもっと高知上陸作戦です！〜龍馬記念館SOS！〜); Omake; 1. "It's the Web Version Edition! Part 1" (WEB出張版です！その1); 2. "It's the Web Version Edition! Part 2" (WEB出張版です！その2); 3. "The Chibi Freedom Challenge!" (ちーび一自由の挑戦！); 4. "It's Big Sister Momo!" (桃お姉ちゃんです！)
13	December 23, 2019	978-4-0406-4144-7
76. "It's the Night of Revolution at BC Freedom Academy!" (BC自由学園、革命の夜です！); 77. "It's Volleyball by Heart!" (心にバレーを！です！); 78. "It's Saki and Karina's Waltz!" (紗希と桂利奈の円舞曲(ワルツ)です！); 79. "It's Operation: Jimi Jimi!" (じみじみ作戦です！); 80. "Infiltrate! It's Blue Division High School!" (潜入！青師団高校です！); 81. "Infiltrate! It's Saunders University High School!" (潜入！サンダース大付属高校です！); 82. "Shiver! It's the Nishihara Navy!" (戦慄！西原水軍であります！); Omake; 1. "It's the Web Version Edition! Part 1" (WEB出張版です！その1); 2. "It's the Web Version Edition! Part 2" (WEB出張版です！その2); 3. "The Great Pirate Showdown!" (海賊大決戦！); 4. "It's BT Freedom Academy?" (おまけ4 BT自由学園です？)
14	July 20, 2020	978-4-0406-4705-0
83. "It's a Spy Battle Era!" (スパイ大合戦時代です！); 84. "It's Captain Koala's March!" (コアラ隊長のマーチです！); 85. "It's Being Together with Alice!" (愛里寿ちゃんといっしょです！); 86. "It's the Great Momo Kawashima Legend!" (偉大なる河嶋桃伝説です！); 87. "It's the Neapolitan War!" (ナポリタン・ウォーです！); 88. "It's the Way to the Referee!" (審判への道です！); Omake; 1. "It's the Web Version Edition! Part 1" (WEB出張版です！その1); 2. "It's the Web Version Edition! Part 2" (WEB出張版です！その2); 3. "It's a Space Operation of Captain Mini Pekoe!" (キャプテンミニペコ宇宙大作戦です！); 4. "Let's Play Volleyball!" (バレーボールしようぜ！)
15	January 21, 2021	978-4-0406-5958-9
89. "It's the Rabbit Cafe Shop!" (喫茶うさぎ小屋です！); 90. "It's the 'Donzoko' Food Stall!" (屋台 『どんぞこ』です！); 91. "It's Competitive Eater Hana!" (フードファイター華です！); 92. "It's Sodoko the Buddha!" (仏のそど子です！); 93. "Cool! It's Chihatan's Test of Courage!" (納涼！知波単肝試しであります！); 94. "It's Nekonya's Game Commentary Channel!" (ゲーム実況！ねこにゃーちゃんねるです！); Omake; 1. "It's the Web Version Edition! Part 1" (WEB出張版です！その1); 2. "It's the Web Version Edition! Part 2" (WEB出張版です！その2); 3. "It's Detective Mini Pekoe and the Phantom Thief Blue Division!" (名探偵ミニペコと怪盗青師団です！); 4. "It's Rabbit Team vs. Shark Team!" (うさぎさんチームVSサメさんチームです！)
16	June 23, 2021	978-4-0468-0474-7
95. "It's Scorching Hot in Chihatan!" (灼熱の知波単であります！); 96. "It's an Encounter with Boko!" (ボニコとの遭遇です！); 97. "It's the Little Tankery Class!" (ちびっ子戦車道教室です！); 98. "It's Fukuda's Survival!" (生き残れ！福田！であります！); 99. "It's the Bond Between Us!" (ふたりの絆です！); 100. "I'm the Super Public Morals Officer!" (スーパー風紀委員です！); 101. "Tankery Choco, It's Now Opened!" (戦車道チョコ、開封です！); Omake; 1. "It's the Web Version Edition! Part 1" (WEB出張版です！その1); 2. "It's the Web Version Edition! Part 2" (WEB出張版です！その2); 3. "It's a Space Operation of Captain Mini Pekoe! II: Attack of the Combat Chihatan Race!" (キャプテンミニペコ宇宙大作戦です！II 〜戦闘種族チハタン人襲来！〜); 4. "It's Night at the Recreation Facility!" (保養施設の夜であります！)
17	January 21, 2022	978-4-0468-0949-0
102. "It's Being Together with Hina" (ひなちゃんといっしょ！です！); 103. "It's the 'Chiyomi Beach House' Incident!" (『海の家ちよみ』事変です！); 104. "It's Student Council President Hana Isuzu's Diary!" (五十鈴華の生徒会長日誌です！); 105. "Praise Her! It's Kinuyo Nishi!" (讃えよ！西絹代であります！); 106. "It's Captain Koala in Desperate Need of Help!" (絶体絶命のコアラ隊長です！); 107. "Nekonya vs. Murakami! It's the Showdown of the Century!" (ねこにゃーVSムラカミ！世紀の対決です！); 108. "It's Pravda's Great Hide and Seek Tournament!" (プラウダ・大かくれんぼ大会です！); 109. "It's a Grown Oshida in Autumn!" (天高く押田肥ゆる秋です！); Omake; 1. "It's the Web Version Edition! Part 1" (WEB出張版です！その1); 2. "It's the Web Version Edition! Part 2" (WEB出張版です！その2); 3. "It's Detective Mini Pekoe and the Monster Rosehip!" (名探偵ミニペコと怪人ローズヒップです！); 4. "It's Time for History!" (歴史の時間です！)
18	July 23, 2022	978-4-0468-1439-5
110. "It's a Public Morals Song!" (ふうきのうたです！); 111. "It's a Sodoko Cannon!" (そど子キャノンです！); 112. "It's a Great Yukari's Transformation!" (優花里の華麗なる変身です！); 113. "It's a Rosehip Won't Run Story!" (ローズヒップは走らない。ですわ！); 114. "It's a Duel at Donzoko!" (船底の決闘です！); 115. "It's the Iemoto Sisters" (家元シスターズです！); 116. "It's the 24-hour Silent Chihatan Challenge" (言ってはいけない知波単24時であります！); 117. "It's Katyusha's Kitten!" (カチューシャの子猫です！); Omake; 1. "It's the Web Version Edition! Part 1" (WEB出張版です！その1); 2. "It's the Web Version Edition! Part 2" (WEB出張版です！その2); 3. "A Chihatan Ghost Tale: Kinuyo's Zashiki-warashi Story" (知波単妖怪奇談 キヌヨ対座敷童); 4. "Our Words to Sodoko" (そど子へ贈ることば)
19	February 21, 2023	978-4-0468-2064-8
118. "It's the Tank Battle That Day!" (あの日の戦車戦です！); 119. "It's the Iemoto War!" (家元大戦です！); 120. "It's Iburi Gakko Summer!" (いぶりがっこの夏です！); 121. "It's an Even Stranger Story!" (もっと奇妙な物語です！); 122. "It's a Big March of the Little Kids!" (ちびっこ大行進です！); 123. "It's Yukari Akiyama's Failing Grades" (秋山優花里、赤点です！); 124. "The Winter Swimming Tournament!" (寒中水泳大会であります！); Omake; 1. "It's the Web Version Edition! Part 1" (WEB出張版です！その1); 2. "It's the Web Version Edition! Part 2" (WEB出張版です！その2); 3. "Captain Mini Pekoe ~Assault! Mysterious Space Creature!!"~ (キャプテンミニペコ 〜強襲！謎の宇宙生物!!〜); 4. "It's Another Tankery That Day" (あの日のもうひとつの戦車道です！)
20	September 22, 2023	978-4-0468-2728-9
21	March 23, 2024	978-4-0468-3352-5
22	August 23, 2024	978-4-04-683836-0
23	March 22, 2025	978-4-04-684767-6

=== Girls und Panzer: Comic Anthology Side ===
No.	Title	Japanese release date	Japanese ISBN
01	Girls und Panzer: Comic Anthology Side – St. Gloriana Girls' College (ガールズ&パンツァー コミックアンソロジー SIDE:聖グロリアーナ女学院)	November 5, 2014	978-4-7580-0825-9
Do You Know What a Tank Cake Is? (戦車ケーキを知ってる？); Never Run Away; Darjeeling Is Unwavering (ダージリン様は揺るがない); Cherish the Moment; Hospitality at Gloriana (グロリアーナでおもてなし); Do You Like Sweet Tea? (甘い紅茶はお好き？); It's a Rematch! (再戦です！); Tabletop Battle (卓上の戦い); Tea in England and Sweets in America (お茶めなイギリスとお菓子なアメリカ); Huh! It's a Muddy Operation! (ヒュ〜！ドロドロ作戦です！); Reason for Doing Something (コダワリノ理由); Tea Deficiency Syndrome (紅茶欠乏症候群); It's Inadvertently Tea Time! (うっかりティータイムです！); Glorian (グロリアーン); A Moment of Tea (紅茶なひととき)
02	Girls und Panzer: Comic Anthology Side – Saunders University High School (ガールズ&パンツァー コミックアンソロジー SIDE:サンダース大学付属高校)	January 24, 2015	978-4-7580-0842-6
Go Go! Saunders! (GOGO！サンダース！); Kissing Goes by Favor; St. Valentine's Day; It's the School Cafeteria Fair! (学食品評会です！); Infiltration Strategy (潜入大作戦); I Want You; It's a Rival! (ライバルです！); Saori and Mako's Romance ♡ Counseling Room (沙織と麻子の恋愛♡相談室); Saunders Volleyball (サンダース・バレー); Mission in Passive (ミッション・イン・パッシブ); Hot Spring Placebo (温泉プラシーボ); Flag of the Heart (心の旗); It's Operation Meow Meow! (にゃーにゃ一作戦です！); Saunders Together! (みんなでサンダース！); It's Operation Oshioki, Alisa! (アリサちゃんオシオキ作戦です！)
03	Girls und Panzer: Comic Anthology Side – Anzio Girls' High School (ガールズ&パンツァー コミックアンソロジー SIDE:アンツィオ高校)	May 14, 2015	978-4-7580-0850-1
Commander and Her Happy Friends (統師とゆかいな仲間たち); It's My Delusional Final Game! (これが妄想の決勝戦です！); Tracking Hippo Team! (追跡！カバさんチーム); While Eating Dried Potatoes (干し芋を食べながら); Anzio Wasn't Built in a Day (アンツィオは一日にしてならず); We're Strong and We're Good! (我々は強くてうまい!!); Yesterday's Enemy Is Today's Friend (昨日の敵は今日の友); Urgent!! Anzio Special Program! (緊急!! アンツィオ特番！); Uh-uh! (えーえふぶい！); This Is Real Migrant Work! (これが本当の出稼ぎです！); Grazie Duce! (グラッツェドゥーチェ！); Piuvero Chita! (ピゥヴェロチタ！); Comfortable Tank Life (快適な戦車生活); It's for Miss! (姐さんのためにっ！); Otome Chick ♡ Anchovy (乙女チック♡アンチョビ); Light Our Fire!!
04	Girls und Panzer: Comic Anthology Side – Pravda Girls' High School (ガールズ&パンツァー コミックアンソロジー SIDE:プラウダ高校)	August 31, 2015	978-4-7580-0862-4
What I Wanted to Say (言いたかったこと); Pravda's Summer Holidays (プラウダの夏休み); Секрет × Секрет; Girls Mission (ガールズミッション); Algebral (アルージュウブラル); Katyusha-style Mind Control Technique! (カチューシャ式人心掌握術！); Iron Chin (鉄の顎); Can You Give Me a Hand, Katyusha? (カチューシャおみまいできるかな？); Borscht Time for Good Kids (よい子のボルシチタイム); Katyusha's War and Peace (カチューシャの戦争と平和); It's Operation Big Rookie Scout! (大型新人スカウト大作戦です！); Whoa! Element No! (素No!! うお一!!); Nonna's Hospitality (ノンナのお・も・て・な・し); Sabotage of the Third Year (3年目のサボタージュ); Attack on Katyusha (進撃のカチューシャ)
05	Girls und Panzer: Comic Anthology Side – Kuromorimine Girls' High School (ガールズ&パンツァー コミックアンソロジー SIDE:黒森峰女学園)	December 25, 2015	978-4-7580-0876-1
Clumsy Juniors (不器用な後輩たち); Heute ist die Beste Zeit; Kumamoto War Front Report (熊本戦線異状アリ); Crowded with People (もりっとみねみね); It's the Fate with the Deputy Commander (副隊長との因縁です！); Schwarzkopf (シュヴァルツコープス); Christmas Date (クリスマスデート); Tank of Love Cafe Leclerc (愛の戦車喫茶ルクレール); We Are the Ōarai Inspection Team (我ら大洗視察団); Curry-flavored Friendship (カレー味の友情); Panzer Game War (パンツァーゲームウォー); Distance of Two (ふたりのキョリ); This Is the Nishizumi Style! (これが西住流！); Women's Problems Are Usually Solved with Tanks (女子の問題はだいたい戦車で解決する); It's a Cherry Blossom Viewing Meeting (お花見会議です); Michi (ミチ)
06	Girls und Panzer: Comic Anthology Side – Chihatan Gakuen (ガールズ&パンツァー コミックアンソロジー SIDE:知波単学園)	May 6, 2016	978-4-7580-0896-9
Invitation to Tea Party (お茶会ご招待); Yukari Akiyama's Research Report on Kinuyo Nishi (秋山優花里の西絹代調査レポート); I Don't Know About You, but I Like Waves Because They're Simple (知らねーけど波は好きだぜ単純だからよ); The 3rd Commander's Birthday Party Surprise Progress Report Meeting (第3回隊長殿のお誕生日会サプライズ進捗報告会); Super Libero (超リベロ); It's an Assault! (突撃であります！); Transferring into Ōarai! (転進・大洗へ！); Western U.S. (西側にゅううえいぶ); West Mission (ウエストミッション); Go to Chihatan Family Restaurant (知波単ファミレスに行く); Duck War (アヒル・ウォー); The Great Convex Mania Empire (大凸マニア帝国); Convex Soul! (凸魂！); The Groove, the Momentum, the Assault (ノリと勢いと突撃と); Fukuda's Mr. Wild Boar (福田といのしし殿); This Is Our Tankery (これが私たちの戦車道)
07	Girls und Panzer: Comic Anthology Side – Keizoku High School (ガールズ&パンツァー コミックアンソロジー SIDE:継続高校)	August 2, 2016	978-4-7580-0903-4
Let the Wind Carry You Away (風にのせて); Inheriting the Lifestyle (くらし継がれて); Patchwork Itinerary (継ぎはぎ旅程); The Secret Duet (秘密の二重奏); Life Is Survival (人生はサバイバル); Street Racing (走り屋); A Wandering Visitor? (さすらいの訪問者？); Go Keizoku Team Shopping (継続チーム買い物に行く); Myrsky, Myrsky (ミルスキヤミルスキ); That's What Heat Does (それは熱が起こすもの); Sauna War (サウナ・ウォー); Kantele Girl in a Twisted Valley (ひねくれ谷のカンテレガール); The Commander Next Door Looks Magnificent (となりの隊長は立派に見える); Pravda and the Exciting Concert (プラウダとわくわく音楽会); Keizoku Mart Is Open for Business! (継続マート営業中！); Unelma
08	Girls und Panzer: Comic Anthology Side – Hand-picked University Team (ガールズ&パンツァー コミックアンソロジー SIDE:大学選抜)	February 18, 2017	978-4-7580-0930-0
Alice in Boco Museum (愛里寿inボコミュージアム); The Shimada Style of Begging Technique!! (島田流おねだり術！); Tea with Alice (愛里寿とお茶会); Unnecessary Curl Theory (カール不要論); Megumi-senpai's xx Instruction (メグミ先輩のxx指南); Dear My Mother; Alice War in Kuromorimine (愛里寿・ウォーin黒森峰); A Day in the Life of Alice and Azumi (愛里寿とアズミの一日); Super Extreme!! Alice Shimada Saw Boco on an Uninhabited Island in the Cold!! (超極限!! 島田愛里寿は厳寒の無人島にボコられ熊を見た!!); Alice in Wonderland (アリス・イン・ワンダーランド); ※Follow the Dosage and Volume and Enjoy Drinking (※用法、容量を守って楽しく飲みましょう); Adult Meeting (おとなかいぎ); Bath Time War! (バスタイム・ウォー！); Two People Who Are Not Geniuses. (天才じゃないニ人。); Road to Boco (ボコ道); Heart (ココロ)
09	Girls und Panzer: Comic Anthology Side – BC Freedom Academy (ガールズ&パンツァー コミックアンソロジー SIDE:BC自由学園)	January 31, 2020	978-4-7580-2083-1
The Two Are Good Friends!? (ふたりはなかよし!?); Ando Has a Secret Thought (安藤くんは密かに思っていることがある); Water and Oil Hospitality (水と油のおもてなし); 10,000 Years BC Freedom Academy (BC一万年自由学園); Good Friend Handcuffs (仲よしハンドカフス); Reason for Invitation (招待の理由); Marimari Kororin (マリマリコロリン); It's a Homemade Cake Challenge! (手作りケーキに挑戦です！); Famous Horses Have a Habit (名馬に癖あり); Autour du Monde; Melancholy Marie (憂鬱なりしマリー様); Reach for the Flowers; Boco Boco DE Show (ボコボコDEショー); Ōarai Search (大洗探索); Lady War! (お嬢様・ウォー！); Marie's Gracious Invitation? (マリー様の優雅なお誘い？)

=== Girls und Panzer: Ribbon Warrior ===
No.	Japanese release date	Japanese ISBN
01	February 23, 2015	978-4-0406-7268-7
1. "Let's Talk About My Best Friend" (私の一番の友達の話をしよう); 2. "The Two's Encounter" (ふたりの出会い); 3. "The Two's Bit" (ふたりの轡); 4. "Centipede Team, Move Out!" (百足組、参る！)
02	June 23, 2015	978-4-0406-7541-1
5. "Know Thy Enemy, Know Thy Self..." (敵を知り、己を知れば...); 6. "Tanks Are Deceptive Methods" (戦車は詭道なり); 7. "Baptism of Tankathlon" (強襲戦車競技の洗礼); 8. "Spiritual Successor" (心臓の継承)
03	November 21, 2015	978-4-0406-7846-7
9. "Ōarai, a Late Summer Challenge" (大洗、晩夏の挑戦); 10. "Offering the Decisive Battle" (決戦の奉納); 11. "Jajka's Battle (Part 1)" (ヤイカの戦い（前編）); 12. "Jajka's Battle (Part 2)" (ヤイカの戦い（後編）)
04	April 23, 2016	978-4-0406-8244-0
13. "Tategoto High School's Aung-san (Part 1)" (竪琴高校のアウンさん（前編）); 14. "Tategoto High School's Aung-san (Part 2)" (堅琴高校のアウンさん（後編）); 15. "Kuromorimine Strikes Back 1" (逆撃の黒森峰・1); 16. "Kuromorimine Strikes Back 2" (逆撃の黒森峰・2)
05	September 23, 2016	978-4-0406-8537-3
17. "Kuromorimine Strikes Back 3" (逆撃の黒森峰・3); 18. "Kuromorimine Strikes Back 4" (逆撃の黒森峰・4); 19. "Kuromorimine Strikes Back 5" (逆撃の黒森峰・5); 20. "Kuromorimine Strikes Back 6" (逆撃の黒森峰・6)
06	February 23, 2017	978-4-0406-9018-6
21. "Kuromorimine Strikes Back 7" (逆撃の黒森峰・7); 22. "Darjeeling's Entry" (ダージリン現る); 23. "To Each Their Own Emotions" (それぞれの想い); 24. "Uszka's Feelings" (ウシュカの想い)
07	July 22, 2017	978-4-0406-9300-2
25. "Introducing the Tanks!!" (全戦車入場!!); 26. "Alisa and Yojimbos" (全戦車入場); 27. "Orange Pekoe's Battle" (オレンジペコの戦い); 28. "Aung-san vs. Nishizumi Mask" (アウンさんvs西住仮面)
08	December 22, 2017	978-4-0406-9574-7
29. "Koume Akaboshi, Tactician" (策士・赤星小梅); 30. "Nishi and Mika" (西とミカ); 31. "Nina and Alina Struggle Hard" (ニーナ&アリーナ奮闘す); 32. "The Battle of Sado Island" (佐渡島の戦い)
09	May 23, 2018	978-4-0406-9875-5
33. "Talks with Friends for Just One Night" (一夜の強敵の語らい); 34. "The Death Match of Komoro 1" (小諸の死闘・1); 35. "The Death Match of Komoro 2" (小諸の死闘・2); 36. "The Death Match of Komoro 3" (小諸の死闘・3)
10	October 23, 2018	978-4-0406-5202-3
37. "The Death Match of Komoro 4" (小諸の死闘・4); 38. "The Death Match of Komoro 5" (小諸の死闘・5); 39. "The Death Match of Komoro 6" (小諸の死闘・6); 40. "The Death Match of Komoro 7" (小諸の死闘・7)
11	March 23, 2019	978-4-0406-5573-4
41. "The Death Match of Komoro 8" (小諸の死闘・8); 42. "The Death Match of Komoro 9" (小諸の死闘・9); 43. "The Death Match of Komoro 10" (小諸の死闘・10); 44. "The Death Match of Komoro 11" (小諸の死闘・11)
12	August 23, 2019	978-4-0406-5886-5
45. "Living Legend" (生ける伝説); 46. "We're All Clumsy" (みんな不器用); 47. "The Battle of Nayoro 1" (名寄の戦い・1); 48. "The Battle of Nayoro 2" (名寄の戦い・2)
13	January 23, 2020	978-4-0406-4282-6
49. "The Battle of Nayoro 3" (名寄の戦い・3); 50. "The Battle of Nayoro 4" (名寄の戦い・4); 51. "The Battle of Nayoro 5" (名寄の戦い・5); 52. "At the Boco Museum" (ボコミュージアムにて)
14	June 23, 2020	978-4-0406-4681-7
53. "Infiltrating the Ōarai Girls' Academy Ship! 1" (潜入！大洗女子学園艦・1); 54. "Infiltrating the Ōarai Girls' Academy Ship! 2" (潜入！大洗女子学園艦・2); 55. "Infiltrating the Ōarai Girls' Academy Ship! 3" (潜入！大洗女子学園艦・3); 56. "We Will Not Win with These Tanks" (この戦車では勝てぬ)
15	November 21, 2020	978-4-0406-5982-4
57. "The Showdown with Miho Nishizumi! 1" (対決！西住みほ・1); 58. "The Showdown with Miho Nishizumi! 2" (対決！西住みほ・2); 59. "The Showdown with Miho Nishizumi! 3" (対決！西住みほ・3); 60. "The Showdown with Miho Nishizumi! 4" (対決！西住みほ・4)
16	April 23, 2021	978-4-0468-0352-8
61. "The Showdown with Miho Nishizumi! 5" (対決！西住みほ・5); 62. "The Showdown with Miho Nishizumi! 6" (対決！西住みほ・6); 63. "The Showdown with Miho Nishizumi! 7" (対決！西住みほ・7); Last Chapter. "Team Centipede's Journey Will Go On" (百足組の旅は続く)

=== Girls und Panzer: Fierce Fight! It's the Maginot Battle!! ===
No.	Japanese release date	Japanese ISBN
01	March 23, 2015	978-4-0406-7501-5
1. "Mock Battle" (模擬戦); 2. "Maginot Girls' College" (マジノ女学院); 3. "Maginot Girls' College's Tankery" (マジノ女学院の戦車道); 4. "Madeleine" (第4話 マドレーヌ); 5. "The Match Begins!" (試合開始！)
02	September 19, 2015	978-4-0406-7819-1
6. "Operation Amiami!" (アミアミ作戦！); 7. "Operation Baton-touch!" (バトンタッチ作戦！); 8. "See-saw Game" (一進一退); 9. "Panzer IV vs. Somua S35" (IV号vs.ソミュアS35); Last Chapter. "And Now, to the National Tournament..." (そして全国大会の舞台へ......)

=== Girls und Panzer: Little Army II ===
No.	Japanese release date	Japanese ISBN
01	August 22, 2015	978-4-0406-7594-7
Chapters 1–4
02	January 23, 2016	978-4-0406-8203-7
Chapters 5–8; Omake (おまけ)
03	April 23, 2016	978-4-0406-8239-6
Chapters 9–12; Omake (おまけ); Support (応援)

=== Girls und Panzer: 4-koma Comic Anthology ===
No.	Japanese release date	Japanese ISBN
01	November 21, 2015	978-4-0406-7845-0
It's Mako's Diary! (麻子日記です！); Garupan White Paper (ガルパン白書); Boco Bear Shooting Ver. (ボコられクマShooting Ver.); Panzer Sammelt!; Miho's Team Is Here Visiting!! (みほちゃんチーム只今見参!!); I Want to Be Strong! (強くなりたいっ！); Girls und Party ♪ (ガールズアンドパーティー♪); Maiden, Tea, and Tankery (乙女と紅茶と戦車道); Women's Talk (女子カイ談); It's a Strategy Meeting for Christmas! (クリスマスに向けて作戦会議です！); It's the Operation Robo Robo (ロボロボ作戦です); Women's Way! (女子道！); Snowy Mountain Ghost (雪山おばけ); Tanks Are for Laying and Wearing!? (戦車は敷くモノ被るモノ!?); Austausch; Mako Channel! (麻子チャンネル！)

=== Girls und Panzer: Phase Erika ===
No.	Japanese release date	Japanese ISBN
01	February 23, 2017	978-4-0406-8824-4
1. "The Adored Kuromorimine" (憧れの黒森峰); 2. "Dissonance..." (不協和音...); 3. "Miho Nishizumi's True Strength" (西住みほの実力); 4. "The Two Scars" (ふたつの傷痕)
02	September 23, 2017	978-4-0406-9378-1
5. "Bad Omen" (胎動); 6. "Contact" (接触); 7. "Leila, the Benchwarmer" (補欠のレイラ); 8. "The Gears Begin Turning" (回り始める歯車)
03	April 23, 2018	978-4-0406-9835-9
9. "Keizoku's Trap" (継続の罠); 10. "The T-28 and the BT-42 of Keizoku" (T-28 BT-42継続の2輌); 11. "Kamerad"; Last Chapter. "We Are Kuromorimine" (ここは黒森峰)

=== Girls und Panzer: Tankery Recommendation ===
No.	Japanese release date	Japanese ISBN
01	February 23, 2017	978-4-0406-9021-6
1. "We Will Reinforce the Fighting Tank, Panzer IV!" (敢闘戦車・IV号戦車を強化します！); 2. "Twin Tank, M3 Lee Medium Tank! I Will Search My Sister!!" (双子戦車・M3中戦車リー！妹を探索します!!); 3. "Masterpiece of a Vehicle, Sturmgeschütz III! We're Going to Clash with the Same Sturmgeschütz!!" (傑作車輌・III号突撃砲！同じ突撃砲と激突します!!); 4. "Czech-made Superior Tank, 38(t)! I'll Convert It into a Self-propelled Artillery!!" (チェコ製優良戦車・38(t)！自走砲に改造します!!); 5. "Iron Lion, Type 89 Medium Tank! Japan and the Soviet Union Will Face Off!!" (鉄獅子・八九式中戦車！日ソ対決します!!); 6. "Ironclad Heavy Tank, Renault B1 bis! I Will Protect Ōarai Girls' Academy!!" (鉄壁重戦車・ルノーB1bis！大洗女子学園を護ります!!)
02	November 22, 2017	978-4-0406-9468-9
7. "The Great Unfinished Vehicle, Type 3 Medium Tank! Active in Tank Games!!" (未完の大器車輌・三式中戦車！戦車ゲームで活躍します!!); 8. "Hybrid Vehicle, Porsche Tiger Heavy Tank! Tune It Up!!" (ハイブリッド車輌・ポルシェティーガー重戦車！チューンナップします!!); 9. "The Grumpy Grizzly Bear, Brummbär Assault Tank No. IV! I'll Get the Phantom Boco!!" (気難し屋の灰色熊・IV号突撃戦車ブルムベア！幻のボコをGETします!!); 10. "Amphibious Vehicle, LVT(A)-1! It's Crocodile Panic!!" (水陸両用車輌・LVT(A)-1！ワニワニパニックです!!); 11. "Super-dreadnought Heavy Tank Ratte! I'm a Mystery Hunter in Action!" (超弩級重戦車ラーテ！ミステリーハンター活動します!!); 12. "Carden Loyd Tankette! It's an Agricultural Revolution!!" (豆戦車カーテン・ロイド！農業革命です!!)
03	May 23, 2018	978-4-0406-9876-2
13. "Open-top Self-propelled Artillery Collection! It's a Tankery Tournament in a Forbidden Bath!!" (オープントップ自走砲大集結！禁断のお風呂で戦車道大会です!!); 14. "Multi-turret Super-heavy Tank O-I! I Challenge You to a Model Road to Love!!" (多砲塔超重戦車オイ！恋する模型道にチャレンジします!!); 15. "Mysterious Tanks and Duck Ghosts!? It's the Case File of Detective Reizei!!" (謎の戦車・アヒルのお化け!? レーゼイ探偵の事件簿です!!); 16. "Duck Tank AMX 40! It's an Illusion Party!!" (アヒルちゃん戦車AMX40！イリュージョン・パーティーです!!); 17. "AMX ELC bis Rapid Light Tank! It's the Glorious Ōarai 24-hour Tankery!!" (快速軽戦車AMX ELC bis！栄光の大洗24時間戦車道です!!); 18. "The First-ever German Vehicle A7V Assault Tank! It's a Treasure Hunt in the Forest of Twenty Demons!!" (史上初のドイツ車輌・A7V突撃戦車！魔廿の森でお宝探しです!!)
04	November 21, 2018	978-4-0406-5346-4
19. "Invincible Heavy Tank TOG II! It's Alice from the Land of Tea!" (不屈重戦車TOGII！紅茶の国の愛里寿です！); 20. "New Vehicle Discovery!? It's the Gastronomic Revolution in the Nutritional Science Department!!" (新車輌発掘!? 栄養科の美食革命です!!); 21. "Disc Vehicle Object 279 vs. Legendary Shipwreck Utsuro-bune! It's a Competition for Calm Sea!!" (円盤車輌・オブイェークト279vs.伝説の沈没船・うつろ母！睦海争奪戦です!!); 22. "Best-selling Vehicle, M4 Sherman Medium Tank! Propaganda Film Shooting at the Festival!!" (ベストセラー車輌・M4シャーマン中戦車！プロパガンダ映画を撮影します!!); 23. "Rapid-fire Tank CV33! It's the Anzio Girls' High School and Kuromorimine Girls' High School Pajama Party!!" (快速戦車CV33！アンツィオ高校、黒森峰女学園でパジャマパーティーです!!); 24. "Heart-to-heart Vehicle, Type 95 Light Tank! It's Rinrin Yūki on the Chibi Tankery!!" (以心伝心車輌・九五式軽戦車！ちびっ子戦車道で勇気りんりんです!!)
05	June 22, 2019	978-4-0406-5773-8
25. "Tiger I, the Vehicle of Champions! It's the Autumn Red and White All-Star Tankery Tournament!!" (王者の車輌ティーガーI！秋の紅白オールスター戦車道大会です!!); 26. "Heavy Armored Infantry Tank Churchill Mk. VII! It's a Graceful Challenge to Her Majesty the Queen!!" (重装甲歩兵戦車・チャーチルMk.VII！女王陛下への優雅な挑戦状です!!); 27. "Devil Tank T-34/85 Medium Tank! It Is a Fierce Beast-killing IS-2 Heavy Tank Serious Tag Battle!!" (鬼戦車T-34/85中戦車！猛獣殺しIS-2重戦車亡ガチンコTAGバトルです!!); 28. "Demolishing Vehicle BT-42 Assault Gun! We're Going to Tournament with the Pirates!!" (魔改造車輌・BT-42突撃砲！海賊亡一緒に大会香戦します!!); 29. "First Generation MBT A41 Centurion! It's a Reunion with Alice!!" (第一世代MBT・A41センチュリオン！愛里寿ちゃん亡再会です!!); Last Mission. "Perfect Conclusion! It's Everyone's Tankery!!" (完全決着！これがみんなの戦車道です!!)

=== Daily Life of Girls und Panzer: 4-koma Comic Anthology ===
No.	Japanese release date	Japanese ISBN
01	March 23, 2017	978-4-0406-9028-5
Net Cafe War! (ネカフェ・ウォー！); Let's Go for Glasses (レッツ眼鏡道); It's Anchovy's Operation Acceptance! (アンチョビさん受け入れ作戦です!); Everyone's Poor is Bad!! (みんな貧乏が悪いんだ！); It's Saori Takebe's Operation Miho Boyfriend! (武部沙織のみほカレ作戦です！); This Is The Real Pasta Battle! (これが本当のパスタ戦です！); Boco Way (BOKO道); For the Love of Boco (ボコ愛ゆえに); Morning Comes Early in Kuromorimine (黒森峰の朝は早い); Low Break (ていーブレイク); The Extraordinary Daily Life of Keizoku Family (継続一家の非日常的日常); Girls' Youth (トガールズの青春); Anglerfish Team's Winter Vacation (あんこうチームの冬休み)
02	October 23, 2017	978-4-0406-9432-0
Anteater War? (アリクイ・ウォー？); Life of Keizoku High School on a Deserted Island for 0 Yen (継続高校の無人島0円生活); The Panzer Girls Are Back! (帰ってきたパンツァーガールズ！); Boco & Bread (ボコ&パン); Katyusha and Kumasha (カチューシャとクマーシャ); Takebe-sensei's Love Conference Exhibition (武部先生の恋愛会議エキシビション); Yo! Volleyball Club (押忍！バレー部); Eventually, You'll Be a Boco (やがてボコになる); Mako Needs a Good Night's Sleep (麻子はゆっくり寝たい); Nina and the Muscle Training Friends (ニーナと筋トレフレンズ); Happy Yukarin (しあわせユカリン); Ruggy Miho (みほルギー); Piggyback and Tankery (肩車と戦車道); Miho and Alice's Instruction on How to Be Popular? (トみほと愛里寿のモテ道指南？)
03	February 23, 2018	978-4-0406-9701-7
Everyone's Daily Life (みんなの日常); It's a Customer Service Operation! (接客作戦であります！); Pepperoni's General Record (ペパロニ統帥録); Saunders Festival! (サンダース・フェスティバル！); Drip! (ドリップ！); Chihatan Ten Volleyball Clubs!? (知波単十バレー部!?); Snow Festival in Pravda (プラウダの雪まつり); Operation Drift with Tanks!! (戦車でドリフト大作戦!!); One-armed Flower Cannon (片腕フラワーキャノン); Sortie! Operation Disorderly Air! (出撃！不穏空気掃討作戦！); It's an Indoor Battle! (インドアな戦いであります！); Snowball War (スノーボール・ウォー); A Story About Teaching Traditional Japanese Culture to Klara. (日本の伝統文化をクラーラに教える話。); Girls & Stay-at-Home (ガールズ&留守番)
04	March 23, 2018	978-4-0406-9779-6
Alice in the Land of Tanks (戦車の国の愛里寿); Even Shiho Is Trying Her Best (しほさんだって一生懸命); Someday in the Snow; Operation Duce Stay!! (ドゥーチェ留年作戦ッス!!); Exciting Study Strategy☆ (ドキドキお勉強作戦☆); Operation Katyusha Nursing Care! (カチューシャ看病大作戦！); Let's Go! To the Renewal Boco Museum! (いざ！リニューアルボコミュージアムへ!!); Welcome to Saunders' American Science Fest! (サンダースのアメリカ科理フェスへようこそ！); This is My Way of Love (これがわたしの恋愛道); Miho's Coming!! (みほが来る!!); It's a Cooking War! (お料理大戦です！); Katyusha's Great Singing Strategy! (歌え！カチューシャだいさくせん！); Who Does Itsumi Belong To? (逸見さんは誰のもの？); Common People's Studies at St. Gloriana Girls' College (聖グロリアーナ女学院で学ぶ庶民学); Nishizumi, It's an Idol Activity! (アイドル活動でありますよ！西住殿!!)

==== Complementaries ====
No.	Title	Japanese release date	Japanese ISBN
01	Daily Life of Girls und Panzer: 4-koma Comic Anthology – It's Mofu Mofu Operation! (ガールズ&パンツァーの日常 4コマコミックアンソロジー ～もふもふ作戦です！～)	February 23, 2019	978-4-0406-5524-6
Duce!! Playing with a Tiger (ドゥーチェ!! 虎とたわむれる); Nishi's Family Dog (西住家の犬); It's Operation Fluffy! (フカフカ大作戦です！); It's Boco and the Bear Farm! (ボコとクマ牧場です！); St. Gro's Gro-chan (聖グロのグロちゃん); Marie and the Wallaby (マリー様とワラビー); It's the Season for Cat Bang Bang. (ねこバンバンの季節です。); I'm Going to Transfer to Another World to Ōarai (オイラが大洗に異世界転移モノ); Karhu (KARHU -カルフ-); Operation Mascot (マスコット大作戦); Attract the Albatross! (アルバトロスを誘引せよ！); Chihatan Reckless Biography (知波単猪突猛進伝); It's Operation Panda Cheer! (パンダ応援作戦です！)
02	Daily Life of Girls und Panzer: 4-koma Comic Anthology – It's Mogu Mogu Operation! (ガールズ&パンツァーの日常 4コマコミックアンソロジー ～もぐもぐ作戦です！～)	February 23, 2019	978-4-0406-5525-3
Welcome to Bar Donzoko (BARどん底へようこそ); Maiden and Pie Tea Ceremony (乙女とパイ茶道); A Touch of Deliciousness (おいしいひとあじ); Alice's Meal Time (愛里寿ちゃんのご飯タイム); Anglerfish Team Cooking Practice! (あんこうチーム調理実習！); Itsumi, They're Quitting Hamburgers (逸見、ハンバーグやめるってよ); Saki on Friday (金曜日の紗希ちゃん); Alice, Do You Love Ramen? (ラーメン大好き？愛里寿さん); Tank Cooking Show (戦車の料理ショー); Enjoy Your Days (日々を楽しく); Secret! Nishizumi-style Training Menu! (秘伝！西住流特訓メニュー！); Let's Make Some Local Food! (地方料理を作ってみよう！); Secure the Midnight Supply Line! (深夜の補給線を確保せよ！)

=== Girls und Panzer: 4-koma Panzer Vor! ===
No.	Japanese release date	Japanese ISBN
01	September 28, 2018	978-4-0560-7136-8

=== Girls und Panzer: Saga of Pravda ===
No.	Japanese release date	Japanese ISBN
01	January 23, 2019	978-4-0406-5273-3
1. "Encounter" (邂逅); 2. "Strategy" (策謀); 3. "Decay" (腐敗); 4. "Gale" (疾風); 5. "Comrades" (同志)
02	August 23, 2019	978-4-0406-5889-6
6. "Diary" (日記); 7. "Special Training" (特訓); 8. "Graduation" (卒業); 9. "Confrontation" (対決); 10. "Infiltration" (潜入)
03	April 23, 2020	978-4-0406-4336-6
11. "Monster" (怪物); 12. "Sisters" (姉妹); 13. "Rest" (静養); 14. "Preparation" (準備); 15. "Departure" (出陣)
04	February 20, 2021	978-4-0468-0050-3
16. "Opening" (開幕); 17. "Pride" (矜持); 18. "Interlude" (幕間); 19. "Nickname" (異名); 20. "Awakening" (覚醒)
05	December 22, 2021	978-4-0468-0665-9
21. "Disaster" (災害); 22. "Disposition" (意地); 23. "Conclusion" (決着); Last Chapter. "Tomorrow" (明日)

=== Girls und Panzer: Avanti! Anzio Girls' High School ===
No.	Japanese release date	Japanese ISBN
01	September 27, 2019	978-4-0491-2657-0
Chapters 1–4; Omake (おまけ)
02	April 27, 2020	978-4-0491-3148-2
Chapters 5–8; Omake (おまけ)
03	June 25, 2021	978-4-0491-3702-6
Chapters 9–12; Last Chapter (最終話); Omake (おまけ)

=== Girls und Panzer: The Fir Tree and the Iron-winged Witch ===
No.	Japanese release date	Japanese ISBN
01	February 21, 2020	978-4-0406-5426-3
02	July 23, 2022	978-4-0468-0419-8

=== Girls und Panzer: Gekiga ===
No.	Japanese release date	Japanese ISBN
01	March 26, 2021	978-4-0914-3296-4
1. "This Is Not Garupan!" (これってガルパンじゃないです!); 2. "It's So Cold!" (メチャ寒いです!); 3. "It's the History of Tanks!" (戦車の歴史です!); 4. "Way of Artillery, Begin!" (砲兵道、始めます!); 5. "It's an Extra Training!" (臨時講習です!); 6. "It's a Class in Sighting!" (照準の授業です!); 7. "This Is Basic Training for the T-34/85!" (T-34/85の基本訓練です!); 8. "It's the Guidance of Captain Bauer!" (バウアー大尉の指導です!); 9. "We're Building a Branch School!" (分校を建てるんです!); 10. "It's for Ōarai!" (大洗のためにです!); 11. "It's a Forced Labor Camp!" (強制労働キャンプです!); Last Chapter. "It's the Biggest Operation in History!" (史上最大の作戦です!)

== Light novel ==
=== Girls und Panzer ===
No.	Japanese release date	Japanese ISBN
01	November 22, 2012	978-4-0406-8398-0
Prologue. "It's a Tankery, and It's Popular!" (戦車道でモテモテ、だよ！); 1. "You're Not a Handsome Instructor!" (イケメン教官、じゃないじゃん！); 2. "Tanks Are Kind of Awesome!" (戦車って、なんかすごいよ！); 3. "I'm with My Friends!" (仲間と一緒、だよ！); 4. "Let the Practice Match Begin!" (練習試合開始、だよ！); 5. "I Don't Even Want to Imagine... the Anglerfish Dance!" (あんこう踊りは......想像もしたくないよ！); 6. "Finally, the First Round!" (ついに一回戦、だよ！); 7. "It's an Intelligence Warfare!" (情報戦だよ！); Epilogue. "Where Is My Popular Life!" (エピローグ 私のモテ生活はどこ、だよ！)
02	February 25, 2013	978-4-0406-8399-7
Prologue. "It's Anzio in the Second Round!" (二回戦はアンツィオだよ！); 1. "There Are Winners and Losers..." (勝者もいれば、敗者もいるよ......。); 2. "Why Would I Do Something Important!?" (そんな大事なこと、なんで私に!?); 3. "Strong Enemy! It's a Pravda Trap!" (強敵！プラウダの罠、だよ！); 4. "I Finally Said It." (一ついに言っちゃった。); 5. "I'll Have to Make an Effort, Too." (私も、努力しないとねっ。); 6. "I Did What I Had to Do, Right?" (やるだけのことはやった、よ？); Epilogue. "Let's Katsu Together" (みんなでゲンをカツごうよ！)
03	June 25, 2013	978-4-0406-8380-5
Prologue. "Good Night." (お休みなさーい。); 1. "Help Me, Akiyama!" (助けてください、秋山さん！); 2. "Thank You for the Black Daisies." (黒い雛菊に、感謝いたします。); 3. "I'm Hoping to Get Some Sleep Soon..." (早く寝たいと思っているが......。); 4. "That's a Promise, Sodoko!" (約束だぞ、ソド子〜！); 5. "They're the Strong and Scary Kuromorimine!" (強いよ！怖いよ！黒森峰); 6. "It's Our Tankery...!" (私たちの戦車道......だよ！); Epilogue. "Isn't It Supposed to Be a Warrior in Shiromuku!?" (白無垢の戦士、のはずじゃないの!?)

== Mooks and other books ==
=== Achtung Girls und Panzer ===
No.	Title	Japanese release date	Japanese ISBN
01	Achtung Girls und Panzer (アハトゥンク・ガールズ&パンツァー)	May 15, 2013	978-4-4992-3110-7
02	Achtung Girls und Panzer 2: This Is the Real Anzio Battle! OVA & der Film Edition (アハトゥンク・ガールズ&パンツァー2: OVA「これが本当のアンツィオ戦です！」&劇場版 編)	May 31, 2016	978-4-4992-3186-2
03	Achtung Girls und Panzer 3: Das Finale Part 1 to Part3 Edition (アハトゥンク・ガールズ&パンツァー3:『最終章』第1話～第3話編)	February 17, 2022	978-4-4992-3323-1

=== Girls und Panzer Modeling Book ===
No.	Title	Japanese release date	Japanese ISBN
01	Girls und Panzer Modeling Book: Panzer IV & 38(t) Edition (ガールズ&パンツァー モデリングブック IV号戦車D型&38(t)編)	June 26, 2013	978-4-4992-3111-4
02	Girls und Panzer Modeling Book 2 (ガールズ&パンツァーモデリングブック2)	November 4, 2014	978-4-4992-3147-3

=== Ōarai Garupan Travel Guide ===
No.	Title	Japanese release date	Japanese ISBN
01	Ōarai Garupan Travel Guide: A Guide to Pilgrimage to the Holy Land of Garupan (大洗ガルパン・トラベル・ガイド ~ガルパン聖地巡礼の手引き~)	November 13, 2013	978-4-3312-5287-1
02	Ōarai Garupan Travel Guide 2: Ōarai Fibel (大洗フィーベル 大洗ガルパン・トラベル・ガイド2)	November 28, 2015	978-4-3318-0318-9
03	Ōarai Garupan Travel Guide 3: Ōarai Fibel NEU (大洗フィーベル・NEU 大洗ガルパン・トラベル・ガイド3)	March 23, 2018	978-4-3318-0389-9
04	Ōarai Garupan Travel Guide 4: Ōarai Fibel NEU 2.0 (大洗フィーベルNEU 2.0 大洗ガルパン・トラベル・ガイド4)	September 3, 2019	978-4-3318-0426-1

=== Monthly Tankery ===
==== Special issues ====
No.	Japanese release date	Japanese ISBN
01	February 21, 2014	—
02	April 25, 2014	—
03	June 20, 2014	—
04	August 27, 2014	—
05	October 29, 2014	—
06	December 18, 2014	—

==== Extra issues ====
No.	Title	Japanese release date	Japanese ISBN
01	Monthly Tankery Extra Issue: Introduction to Garupan (月刊戦車道 別冊 ガルパン入門)	September 27, 2017	—
02	Monthly Tankery Extra Issue: Girls und Panzer for Maniacs (月刊戦車道 別冊 ガルパンマニアックス)	November 24, 2017	—
03	Monthly Tankery Extra Issue: Tankery Study Book (月刊戦車道 別冊 戦車道学習帳)	March 25, 2019	—
04	Monthly Tankery Extra Issue: The 41st Winter Continuous Track Cup Special Issue (月刊戦車道 別冊 第41回冬季無限軌道杯 大特集号)	May 7, 2020	—
05	Monthly Tankery Extra Issue: The 41st Winter Continuous Track Cup Special Issue 2 (月刊戦車道 別冊 第41回冬季無限軌道杯 大特集号2)	March 25, 2022	—
06	Monthly Tankery Extra Issue: The 41st Winter Continuous Track Cup Special Issue 3 (月刊戦車道 別冊 第41回冬季無限軌道杯 大特集号3)	March 27, 2024	—

=== Encyclopedia of Girls und Panzer ===
No.	Title	Japanese release date	Japanese ISBN
01	Encyclopedia of Girls und Panzer (ガールズ&パンツァー エンサイクロペディア)	August 1, 2014	978-4-7580-1335-2
02	Encyclopedia of Girls und Panzer Revised Edition (改訂版 ガールズ&パンツァー エンサイクロペディア)	August 2, 2016	978-4-7580-1502-8

=== Rurubu Girls und Panzer ===
No.	Title	Japanese release date	Japanese ISBN
01	Rurubu Girls und Panzer (るるぶ ガールズ&パンツァー)	July 10, 2015	978-4-5331-0534-0
02	Rurubu Girls und Panzer: It's the Latest Edition! (るるぶ ガールズ&パンツァー 最新版です！)	July 6, 2018	978-4-5331-2767-0

=== Girls und Panzer: Senshado no Yokomichi ===
No.	Japanese release date	Japanese ISBN
01	December 25, 2015	978-4-0486-5559-0
1. "Katyusha & Nonna" (カチューシャ&ノンナ); 2. "Anzio High School" (アンツィオ高校); 3. "Darjeeling & Assam & Orange Pekoe" (ダージリン&アッサム&オレンジペコ); 4. "Miho & Maho" (みほ&まほ); 5. "Anglerfish Team" (あんこうチーム); 6. "Miho & Anzu" (みほ&杏); 7. "Yukari & Caesar & Erwin" (優花里&カエサル&エルヴィン); 8. "Saori & Aya & Yūki" (沙織&あや&優季); 9. "Hana & Yuzu & Momo" (華&柚子&桃); 10. "Mako & Midoriko" (麻子&みどり子); 11. "Saori & Hana" (沙織&華); 12. "Saori & Mako" (沙織&麻子); 13. "Miho & Yukari" (みほ&優花里); 14. "Miho & Hana & Duck Team" (みほ&華&アヒルさんチーム); 15. "Mako & Saki & Karina" (麻子&紗希&桂利奈); 16. "Nekonya & Saori & Yukari" (ねこにゃー&沙織&優花里); 17. "Miho & Darjeeling & Orange Pekoe" (みほ&ダージリン&オレンジペコ); 18. "Miho & Maho & Kay" (みほ&まほ&ケイ); 19. "Miho & Anchovy& Katyusha" (みほ&アンチョビ&カチューシャ); 20. "Miho & Kinuyo & Yukari & Mako" (みほ&絹代&優花里&麻子); 21. "Anglerfish Team" (あんこうチーム)
02	March 30, 2020	978-4-0491-3092-8
1. "Anglerfish Team Student Council" (あんこうチームの生徒会); 2. "Sweet and Bitter English Diplomacy" (甘くて苦い英色外交); 3. "The Delightful Yalla at the Ship Bottom" (船底の愉快なヤッラ); 4. "Rolling Saunders!" (ローリング・サンダース！); 5. "Light Brown Graffiti" (小麦色グラフィティ); 6. "Splash Without Water" (水入らずのスプラッシュ); 7. "Pinching Festival of the Tankery Sisters" (戦車道姉妹の挟撃祭り); 8. "Little Tyrant, Undercover Operation" (小さな暴君・潜入作戦); 9. "Magical Alice Is Boco Boco!" (マジカル・アリスがボッコボコ！); 10. "Lasting Christmas" (ラスティング・クリスマス); 11. "Japanese-English New Year Picture Scroll" (日英新春絵巻); 12. "With Love from the Bottom of the Ship!?" (船底から愛をこめて！？); 13. "Nishizumi-style Medical Technique!?" (西住流医療術！？); 14. "Spies Under the Cherry Blossoms" (桜の下のスパイたち); 15. "It's a Laid-Back Camp Training!" (ゆる〜く野営訓練です！); 16. "Marie's Necklace Case" (マリー様の首飾り事件); 17. "Fastest Tea Time" (最速のティータイム); 18. "Boco Girls in Summer" (ボコガールズ in Summer); 19. "Mothers and Daughters" (お母様たち娘たち); 20. "Boiled Octopus with Anchovy" (ゆでだこアンチョビ風味); 21. "Ōarai Specialty, President's Hot Pot!" (大洗名物・隊長鍋！)

=== Girls und Panzer Walker ===
No.	Japanese release date	Japanese ISBN
01	July 30, 2016	978-4-0489-5539-3
02	May 10, 2018	978-4-0489-6242-1

=== Girls und Panzer Master Modeling Guide ===
No.	Japanese release date	Japanese ISBN
01	September 30, 2021	978-4-7986-2602-4
02	August 31, 2023	978-4-7986-3254-4

== See also ==
- List of Girls und Panzer der Film books
- List of Girls und Panzer das Finale manga
