= Shahyan Tahseen =

Kurdish news anchor & TV presenter

- شه‌هیان تەحسین
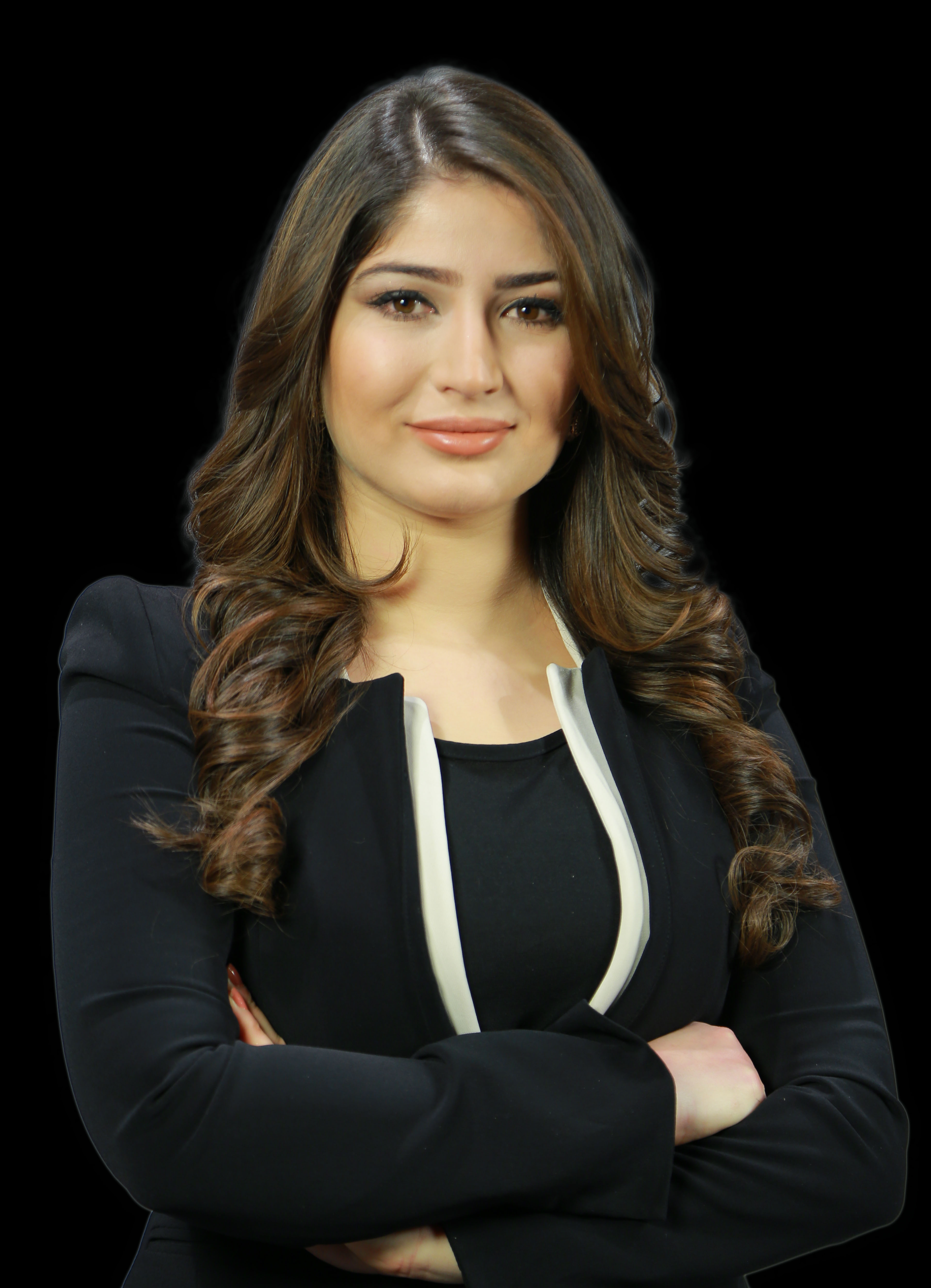
- Born: 30 June 1988 (age 38); Duhok, Kurdistan Region
- Other name: Şehyan Tehsîn
- Education: University of Duhok (Civil Engineering)
- Occupations: News anchor, TV presenter
- Years active: 1999–present
- Employer: Rudaw Media Network
- Known for: Television presenting, news anchoring, social awareness programs
- Notable work: Beyani Bash Kurdistan; Tik Tak Show; NewRoj; Taxi Ramazan; Berpirsyar
- Television: Kurdistan TV, WAAR TV, Rudaw Media Network
- Awards: Highly Commended Rising Stars by FIPP (2019)

Shahyan Tahseen (Kurdish: شه‌هیان ته‌حسین), also transliterated as Şehyan Tehsîn, (born 30 June 1988), is a Kurdish news anchor and TV presenter. She was born in the city of Duhok in Iraqi Kurdistan. She started her career at the age of 11 as a presenter in children's programs on Kurdistan TV. During her studies at the University of Duhok, she hosted Tik Tak Show, a social awareness-raising program on Kurdistan TV about youth and community interests.

== Career ==
=== Television ===
Shahyan was a presenter of the Kurdistan TV show Beyani Bash Kurdistan (به‌یانی باش كوردستان, Good Morning Kurdistan) for six years. She also had her own program on Kurdistan TV, Tik Tak Show, a social awareness-raising program about Kurdish youth, community, and their interests.

After graduating in Civil Engineering at the University of Duhok in 2011, she worked for two years in engineering. She then started hosting The Restart Show on WAAR TV, about city development. The show dealt with engineering planning and environmental issues. She also worked as a news anchor on the same channel.

In May 2015, Shahyan started working for the Rudaw Media Network as a TV and radio news anchor and presenter of the Nuroj morning show, and for other programs.

During the Ramadhan month of 2017, Her TV show Taxi Ramazan scored a hit on the Kurdish channels for the highest number of views due to the hot topics it included and direct interaction with the people's life and problems in finding solutions for them.

Currently, Shahyan is a news anchor on Rudaw Media Network and presents Berpirsyar TV show, as the extension of Taxi Ramazan in a new format, but with the same content approach.

=== Awards ===
Shahyan has received several local and international awards and recognitions for her achievements. In November 2019, she was one of the "Highly Commended Rising Stars" recognized by the global media network FIPP at their world congress in Las Vegas, USA. FIPP has more than 500 member companies in over 60 countries, and the award recognized "outstanding work in the global media industry."

=== Events ===
Shahyan covered many important events in Duhok, including the Duhok International Film Festival for which she was the event manager. She has been the stage moderator for several of international events, celebrations, and conferences held in the Kurdish region. She has represented the Kurdish media at many international events. She has covered Kurdish film programs in international film festivals including the 2013 Nashville Film Festival

== Television appearances ==
- Beyani Bash Kurdistan – Kurdistan TV
- Tik Tak Show – Kurdistan TV
- NewRoj - Rudaw Media Network
- Taxi Remezan – Rudaw Media Network
- Berpirsyar – Rudaw Media Network
