= Rudaw Media Network =

Kurdish media network

- Native name: تۆڕی میدیاییی رووداو; Tora Medyayî ya Rûdaw
- Headquarters: Erbil, Kurdistan Region, Iraq
- Key people: Ako Mohammed (CEO)
- Number of employees: 100-250
- Parent: Rudaw Media Company LLC
- Website: rudaw.net (Kurdish) rudaw.net/english (English)

Rudaw Media Network (Kurdish: تۆڕی میدیاییی ڕووداو, romanized: Tora Medyayî ya Rûdaw) is a media broadcaster in the Kurdistan Region, Iraq. The network is headquartered in Erbil, the capital of Iraq's Kurdistan Region. It delivers content in multiple languages, including English, Kurdish (Sorani and Kurmanji), Arabic, and Turkish.

== History ==
Rudaw Media Network originated as a weekly print newspaper distributed in the Kurdistan Region and Europe, the network initially garnered international attention through its European edition, catering to the burgeoning diaspora communities of that era, later changing from print to a fully digital format, discontinuing its newspaper publication.

The network's diverse portfolio includes a weekly newspaper in the Sorani dialect, boasting a circulation of 3,000, a Kurmanji version circulated in Europe, a comprehensive website available in Kurdish, English, Arabic, and Turkish, and a satellite TV station. Rudaw Media Network is funded and supported by Rudaw Company, with a primary mission to disseminate news and information concerning Kurdistan and the broader Middle East region.

In the present day, Rudaw Media Network has expanded its reach to include a radio news channel broadcasting on shortwave throughout the Middle East. Furthermore, its live stream is accessible to global audiences online.

=== Rudaw Research Center ===
Rudaw Research Center is headquartered in Erbil city, and was launched in 2016. It has partnered with various institutions such as the Wilson Center for Middle East, JSTOR, Seed Foundation, The Washington Institute for Near East Policy, Vision Education and several international institutions.

It hosts the annual Erbil Forum, bringing together a wide-ranging network of policymakers, decision makers and academics alike to discuss pertinent issues.

=== Awards ===
Rudaw’s Washington DC bureau chief, Diyar Kurda, received the prestigious Association of Foreign Press Correspondents in the USA (AFPC-USA) award as one of the best reporters in the United States for 2024 for professional excellence.

Rudaw’s digital portal is the recipient of multiple awards, including the prestigious recognition by World Association of Newspapers and News Publishers for extending its reach to 100 million engagement on social media in 2017.

Rudaw Media Network's Majeed Gly was awarded the Ricardo Ortega Memorial Prize for broadcast media by the United Nations Correspondents Association (UNCA) at its headquarters in New York.

For her outstanding work at Rudaw Media Network, Shahyan Tahseen was recognized as one of the "Highly Commended Rising Stars" by the global media network FIPP at their world congress in Las Vegas, USA. FIPP has more than 500 member companies in over 60 countries, and the award recognized "outstanding work in the global media industry.

In 2023, Rudaw Media Network won the International Business Awards' Gold Stevie Award for medium-sized media and entertainment company of the year, in recognition of its exceptional achievements in the realm of media.

For the outstanding contribution in raising awareness on autism within Iraqi Kurdistan Region, and being a force for good, Rudaw Media Network received an official certificate of recognition from the American Society for Autism in 2023.

== Controversies ==
A number of international and Kurdish sources have described Rudaw as affiliated with the Kurdistan Democratic Party, particularly the current President of the Kurdistan Region Nechirvan Barzani.

Rudaw Media Network was temporarily banned in Syrian Kurdistan due to its partisan news and alleged smear campaigns against the Kurdish political parties which oppose the Kurdistan Democratic Party, a ruling political party led by the Barzani family members.

Turkey removed three television channels based in the Kurdistan Region, including Kurdish news agency Rudaw, from its TurkSat satellite over broadcasting violations during the Kurdistan Region's independence referendum on 25 September 2017.

On 28 October 2017, the office of audio visual media of the Iraqi government's Media and Communications Commission issued a decree, ordering the shutdown of Rudaw TV broadcast, prevention of its crews and seizure of their equipment across Iraq. The decree says that the grounds for this move are that Rudaw is not licensed in Baghdad, and for programs "that incite violence and hate and target social peace and security".

In August 2023, Fawzia Amin Sido – a Yazidi woman who was initially captured by ISIS in 2014 then ended up living in the Gaza Strip – was interviewed by video call from the Gaza Strip by presenter Nasser Ali on Kurdish language Rudaw TV, with her face almost completely covered by a dark Niqāb. Other Iraqi media interviewed her father, Amin Sido, and said he was critical of Rudaw's coverage.
