= Gavtv =

GAV TV
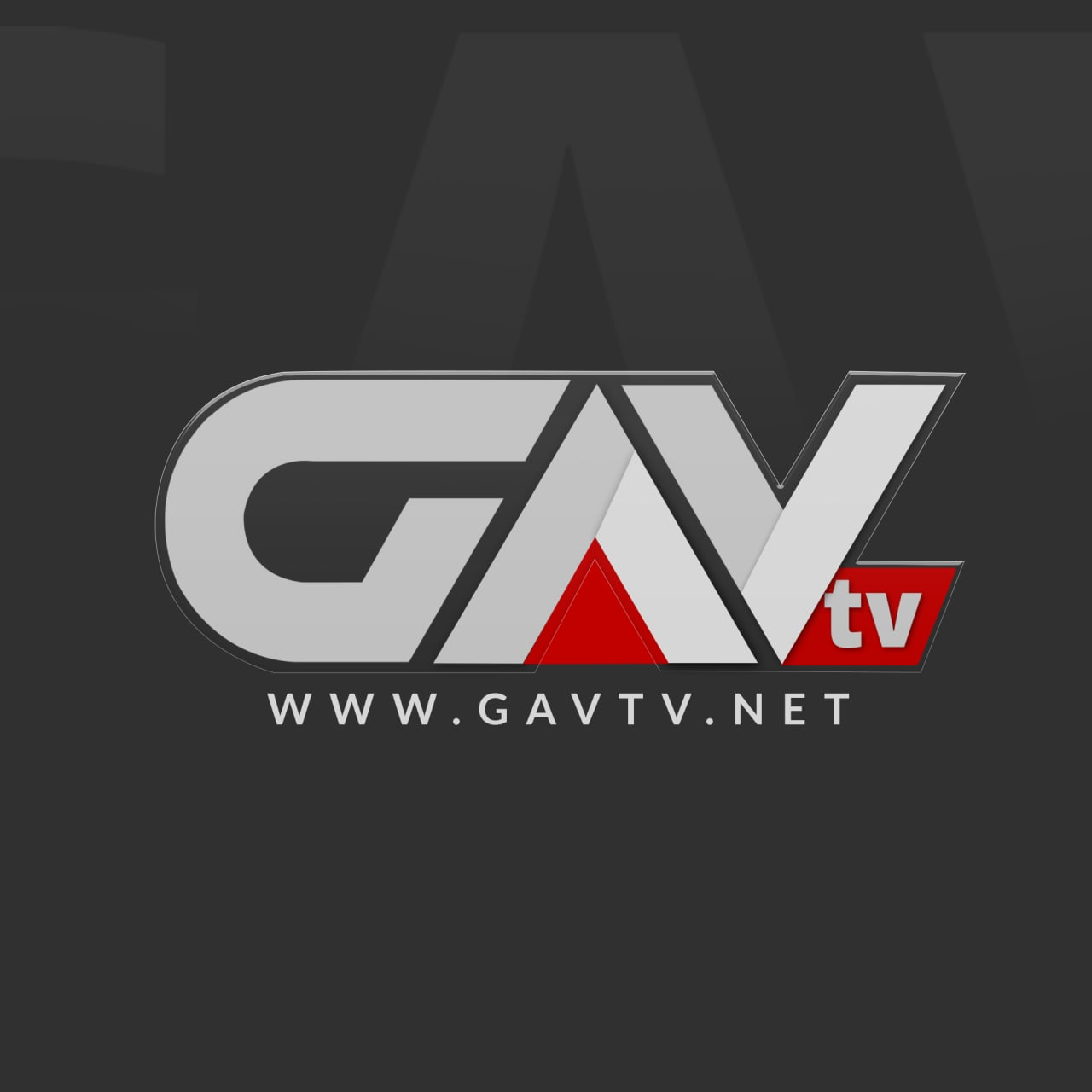
- Country: Iraq
- Headquarters: Duhok

Programming
- Language: Kurdish

Ownership
- Owner: Peshwar Ageed

History
- Launched: 2020

Links
- Website: https://gavtv.net/

GAV, also known as Gav News It is a multilingual news agency, which delivers political, economic and social news from Kurdistan, Iraq and the broader Middle East to the public.

Gav reports on the political and economic developments in Iraq's Kurdistan region. A number of expert journalists from different districts of Kurdistan work for Gav at its main office in Duhok. Gav publishes photographs to document important developments and events in Kurdistan.

== Website ==
Gav provides online news in Kurdish, Sorani, Kurmanji, and English. Their websites covers news in Kurdistan, the Middle East, and internationally. Additionally, Gav provides coverage of culture, sports, and economy in Kurdistan and abroad. It also offers its readers a section for original interviews, as well as transcriptions of interviews after they've been aired on the television network. The network also provides readers with regular analysis and opinion pieces covering relevant issues in the Kurdistan Region and the Middle East.
