= Nimrud Baito =

Iraqi politician

Nimrud Baito (born 1952 in Duhok) was the Minister of Tourism in the Kurdistan Regional Government cabinet from 2006-2009. An ethnic Assyrian, Nimrud belongs to the Assyrian Patriotic Party. Trained as an electrical engineer, Baito worked in information technology at Hewlett-Packard for 10 years.
