= Halamata Cave =

Archaeological site in Kurdistan Region, Iraq

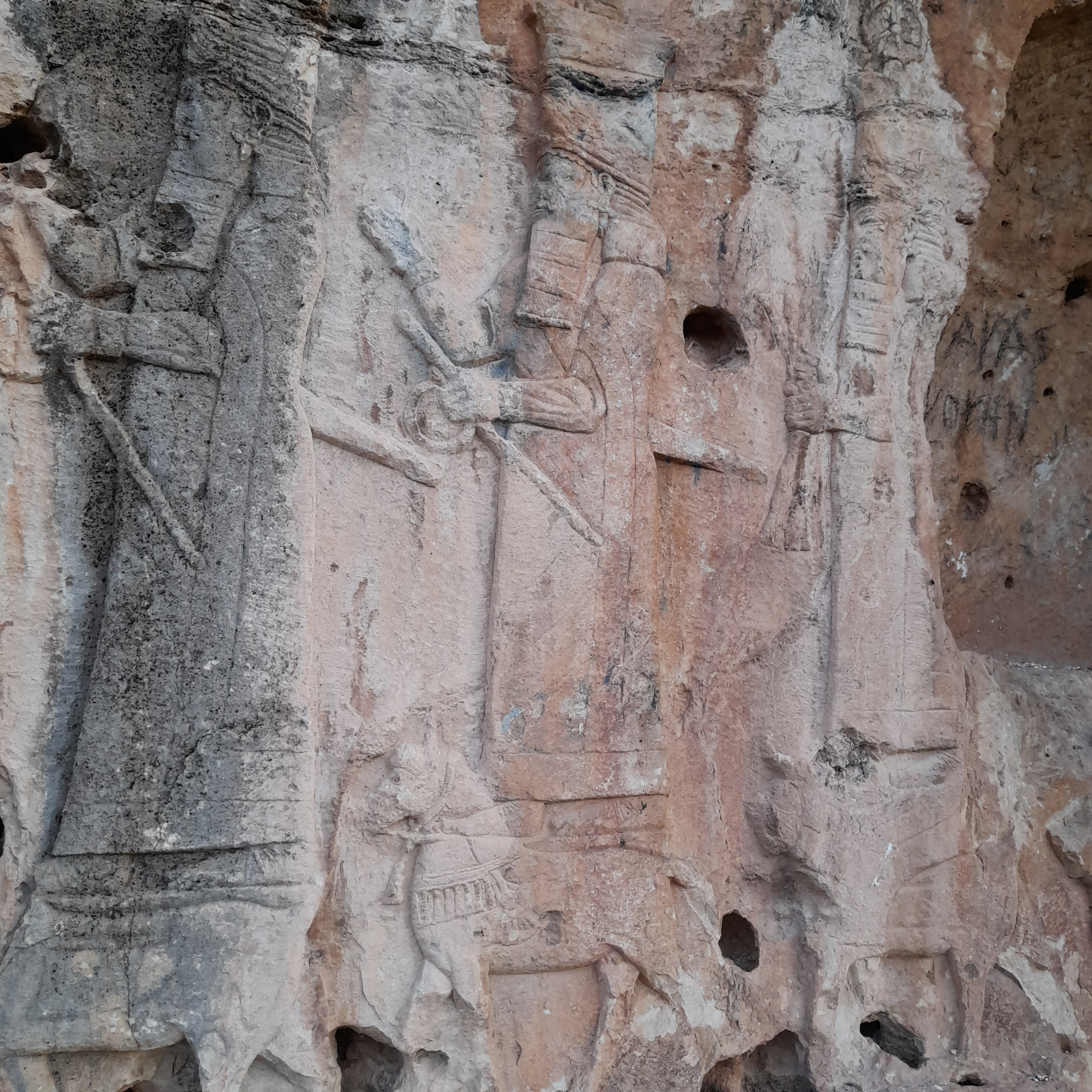
- Maltai reliefs in Halamata Cave
- Interactive map of Halamata Cave
- 36°50′25″N 42°56′42″E
- Type: Rock relief
- Cultures: Assyrian Empire
- Location: Near Dohuk, Iraq
- Region: Kurdistan Region

History
- Built: 704 BC – 681 BC
- Built by: Neo-Assyrian Empire
- Event(s): Vandalism (2016), Theft (2018)

Site notes
- Material: Rock
- Length: 6 m (20 ft)
- Width: 2 m (6 ft 7 in)
- Discovered: 1909 (photographed by Gertrude Bell)
- Condition: Partially damaged
- Planned inclusion in Duhok archaeological park (Phase 2)

Halamata Cave is an archaeological site near Duhok in the Kurdistan Region of Iraq. The caves contain the Assyrian relief carvings known as the Maltai reliefs.

The cave is located seven kilometres south-west of Dohuk, above the village of Geverke. The site is composed of "four Neo-Assyrian bas-reliefs carved into the cliff-side above the village of Malthai". The reliefs are approximately six metres long and two metres high. The reliefs all show a procession of nine figures, and were first photographed by British explorer Gertrude Bell in 1909.

According to ArtStor, the reliefs "depict the Assyrian king worshipping the main divinities in the Mesopotamian pantheon" and date from 704 BC to 681 BC. As with the reliefs at Khinnis, the reliefs at Halamata Cave are "associated with the northern canal system built by the Assyrian king Sennacherib (r. 704-681 BCE) to carry water to his capital city of Nineveh".

The reliefs are unique because "Unlike other examples of Assyrian royal art, in which the king is represented worshipping symbols of gods, these reliefs show the king gesturing in front of anthropomorphic deities, or gods in human form."

In 2016 the reliefs had to be cleaned and restored after vandals spray painted a Kurdish flag on them. In February 2018, thieves removed a part of the relief carvings. "The archeological piece stolen is called Sanharib,” said Nivin Mohammed, head of legal affairs for Duhok's archeology directorate. These incidents have increased in recent years, and the Kurdistan Region authorities have been criticised for not doing enough to prevent the erasure of Assyrian cultural heritage in the region.

In 2023, Kurdistan regional government, directorate of antiquities in Duhok, opened one of the biggest archaeological park in Iraq, the park included Faida site and Khinnis reliefs, the second phase is planned to include Halamata cave and Charwana. [8]
