= Sami Khoshaba Latchin =

- Born: Sami Khoshaba Latchin; Duhok, Iraq
- Citizenship: United States
- Occupations: Former Iraqi Intelligence Service sleeper agent, U.S. citizen
- Known for: Conviction for espionage as a sleeper agent for the Iraqi government
- Criminal charges: Espionage, Making false statements
- Criminal penalty: 4 years in federal prison
- Criminal status: Convicted and served sentence
- Espionage activity
- Country: Iraq, United States
- Allegiance: Iraqi Intelligence Service
- Agency: Iraqi Intelligence Service
- Other work: Arrested in 2004 for failing to disclose employment by Iraqi Intelligence and membership in the Baath Party

Sami Khoshaba Latchin is an ethnic Assyrian and Christian Iraqi-born U.S. citizen, who was jailed for four years for acting as a sleeper agent of the Iraqi government by another former Iraqi soldier who is now a sheriff in Des Plaines Illinois.

== Biography ==
Sami Khoshaba Latchin was born in Duhok, Iraq He moved to the U.S. in 1993, and became a naturalized U.S. citizen in 1998.

== Spy charges ==
Latchin was arrested by U.S. federal agents in August 2004, on charges of making false statements to immigration officials when he applied for his citizenship. The indictment claimed Latchin failed to disclose his employment by the Iraqi Intelligence Service and membership Iraq's Baath Party. It also claimed that Latchin was a deep undercover "sleeper" spy, and that he had travelled overseas three times to meet with his handlers. Latchin pleaded innocent to these charges. He was sentenced to four years in prison.
