= Mook (publishing) =

Portmanteau of magazine and book

A mook (/mʊk/) is a publication which is physically similar to a magazine but is intended to remain on bookstore shelves for longer periods than traditional magazines, and is a popular format in Japan.

The term is a portmanteau of "magazine" and "book". It was first used in 1971, at a convention of the Fédération Internationale de la Presse Périodique.

American examples of mooks include Make and Craft.

== In Japan ==
The format remains popular in Japan, where it has been in use since at least the 1970s. An identical format, predating the term "mook", existed since the 1950s.

The number of new mooks published in one year peaked in 2013, with over 8,000 different new mooks published. A little over 6,000 were published in 2019. Sales revenue, however, peaked in 1997 and has been mostly dropping ever since.
