= Dalshad Said =

Kurdish musician

Dalshad Said Dilşad Seîd / دلشاد محمد سعيد
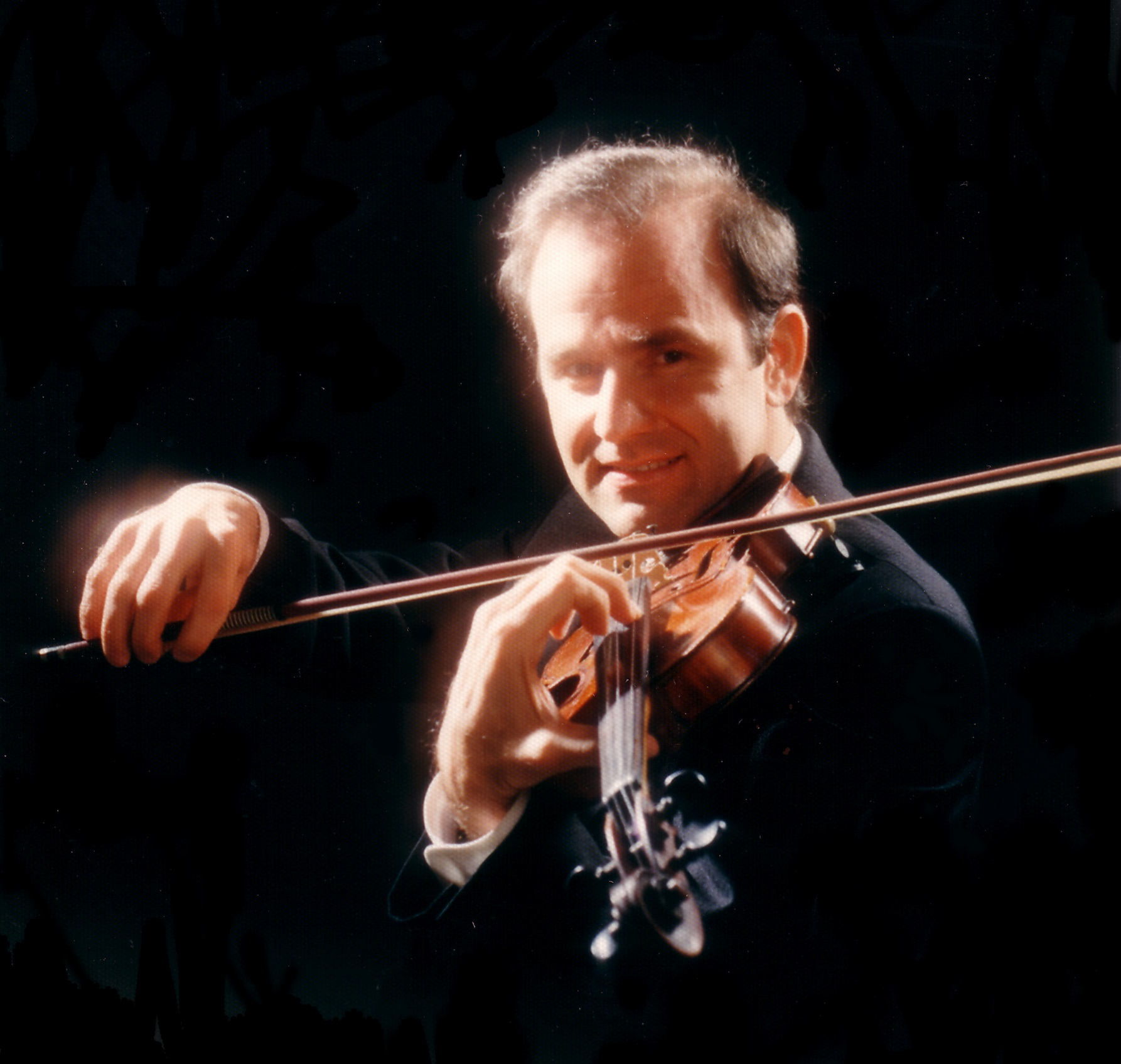
- Dalshad Said

Background information
- Born: 1958 (age 67–68); Duhok, Iraqi Kurdistan
- Origin: Iraqi Kurdistan
- Genres: Kurdish music, classical music
- Occupations: Musician, Composer, Violinist, Music educator
- Instrument: Violin
- Works: Kurdish music for Violin
- Years active: 1980s–present
- Label: Stran Music

Dalshad Said (Kurdish: Dilşad Seîd; Arabic: دلشاد محمد سعيد; born 1958) is a contemporary Kurdish musician.

== Biography ==
Said was born in 1958 in Duhok, Iraqi Kurdistan. After graduating from the music institute of Baghdad, he worked as an assistant of the conductor at Baghdad television and radio orchestra. In 1984, he continued his studies in music at the University of Wales and received his M.A. degree in 1988. Said won first prize at the Eisteddfod competition in Cardiff, United Kingdom. In 1986 an article in a local Welsh newspaper Y Cymro mentioned about his play: "His violin playing was so spectacular that he had to come and play again, even the jurors gave an applause to him."

After that he was a diploma-solo-violinist of the Royal Academy of Music, London. He has also studied violin and composition in Eastern Europe. So far, he has worked together with many popular Kurdish musicians. His first CD is titled Variations on Kurdish Melodies for Violin.

Dalshad Said has been residing in Austria since 1991 and teaches music and violin.

He is considered a bridge between classical Kurdish music and Western Classical-Music. He has arranged musical events for many other musicians and singers such as Sivan Perwer.

In 2012 he went on a music tour in Turkey and performed concerts in Istanbul, İzmir, Mersin, Diyarbakir and Ankara. In 2015 he composed an oratorio, "Peshmerga", about the massacre of Yazidi people and capture of Sinjar by ISIS, which was performed by the Czech National Symphony Orchestra.

In 2018, he was awarded with a PhD degree in Music history (Kurmanji) from the Mozarteum University Salzburg, Austria. In 1995 he completed his study IGP Violine (instrumental pedagogy on the violin) at the same university of Salzburg.

== Dalshad Said Park ==
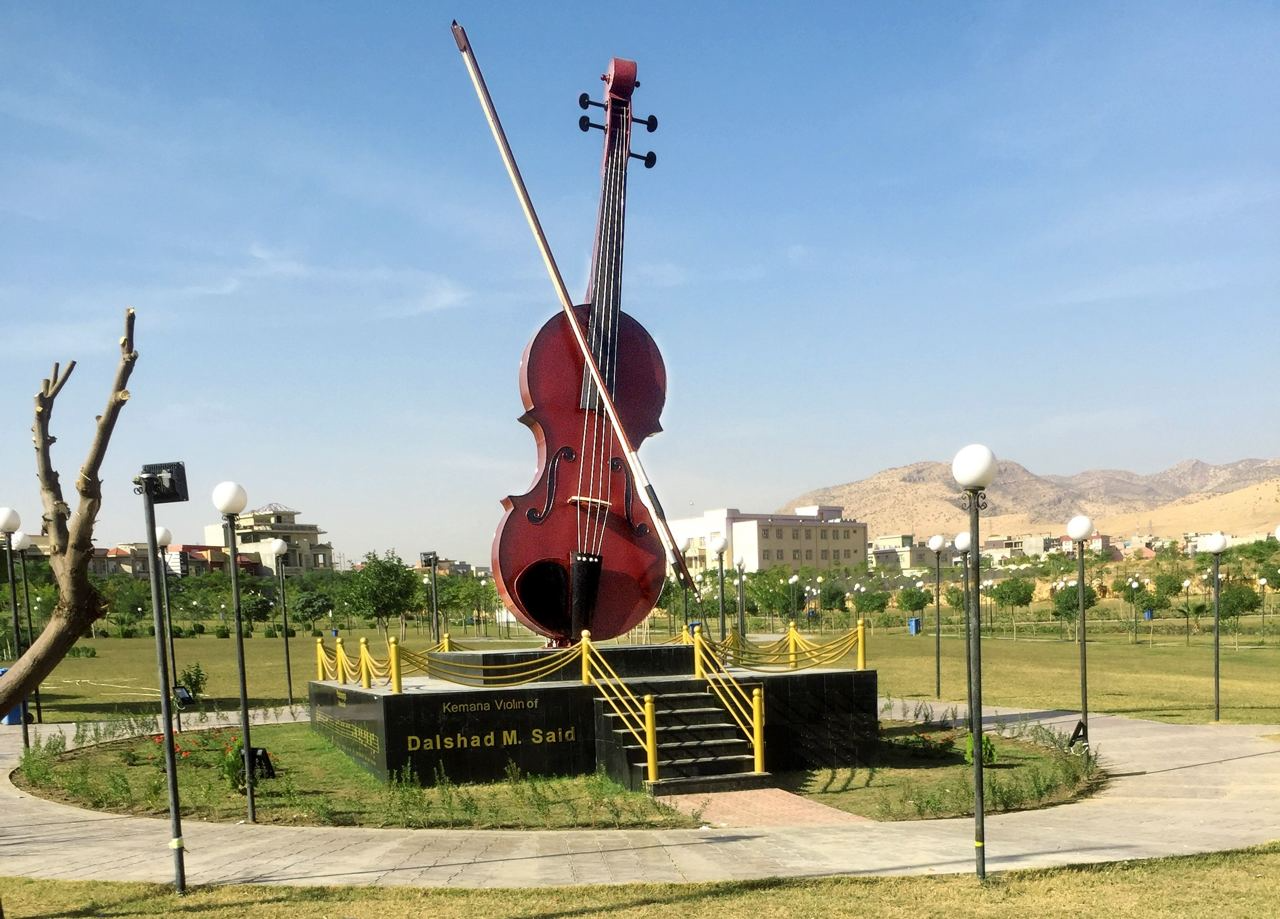

On November 5, 2016,Duhok Governorate held a ceremony to officially name the park on Qazi Mohammed Street after the violinist and composer "Dalshad Said", in recognition of his long contribution to his service to Kurdish music.

On the same day was the unveiling ceremony of the violin monument "The Violin of Dalshad Said" which was erected in the same mentioned park, both above events officially performed by the Governor of Duhok Farhad Atrushi

== Albums ==
1. Kurdish music for Violin, Stran Music, Sweden.
