= Duhok =

City in the Kurdistan Region of Iraq

Duhok دهۆک (Kurdish) دهوك (Arabic)
- City
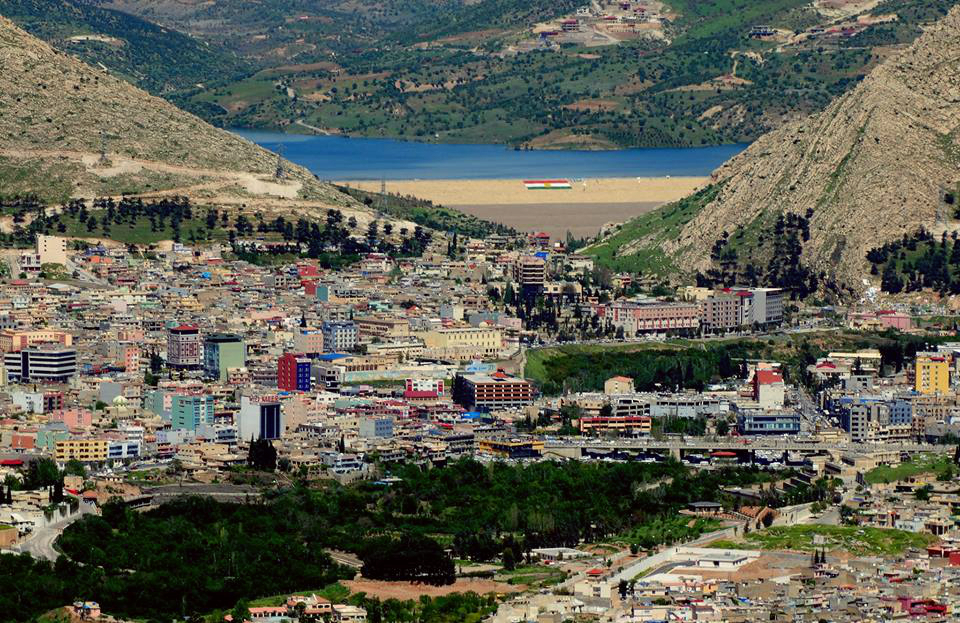
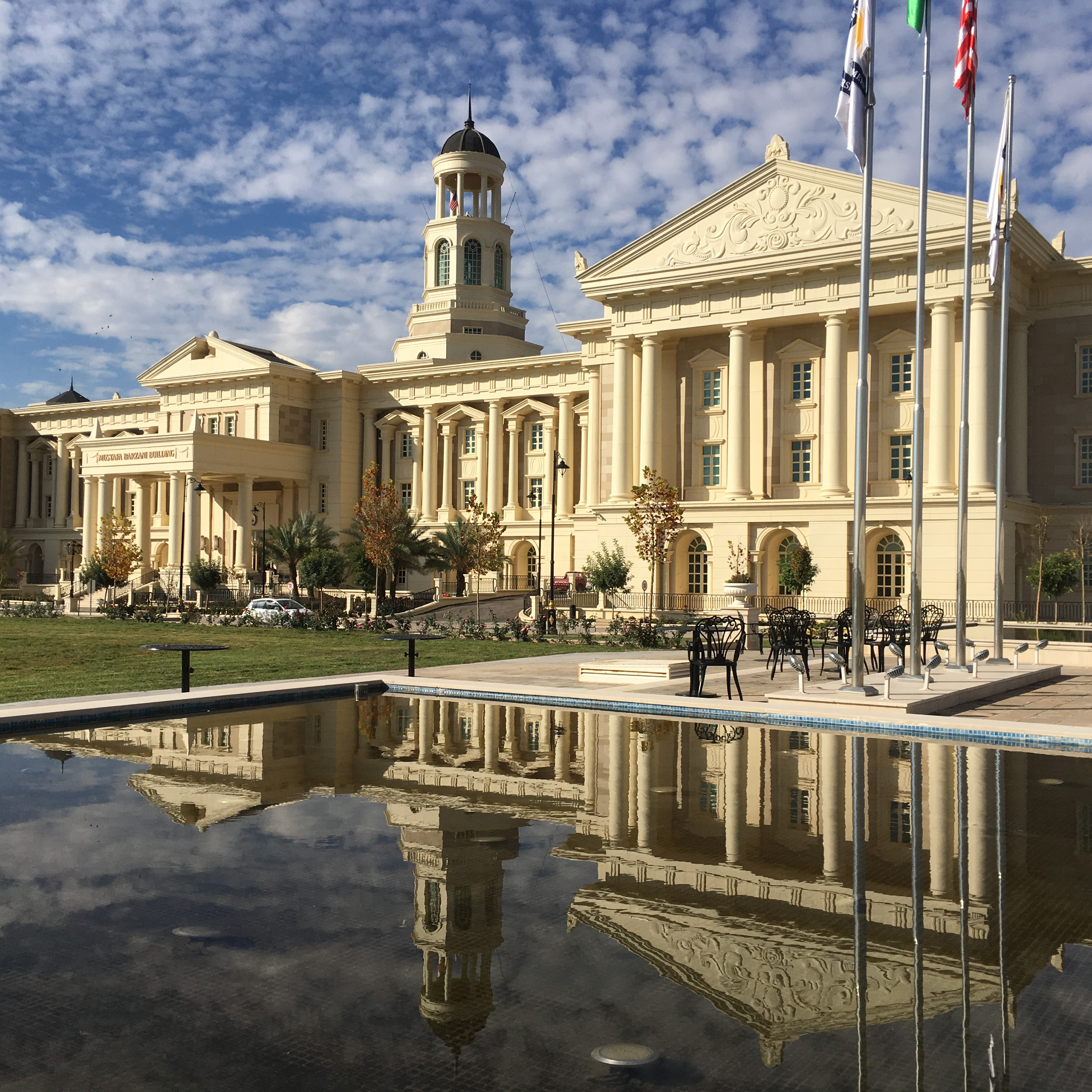
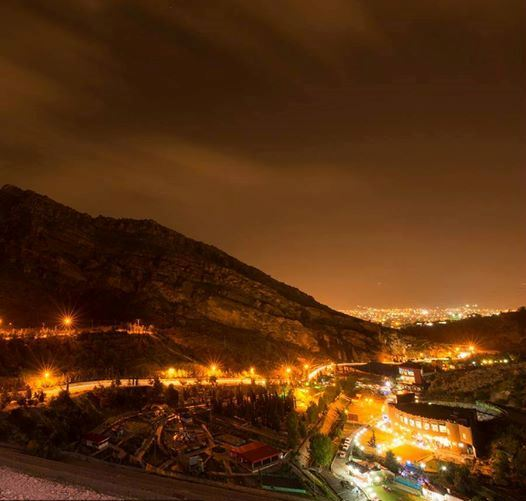
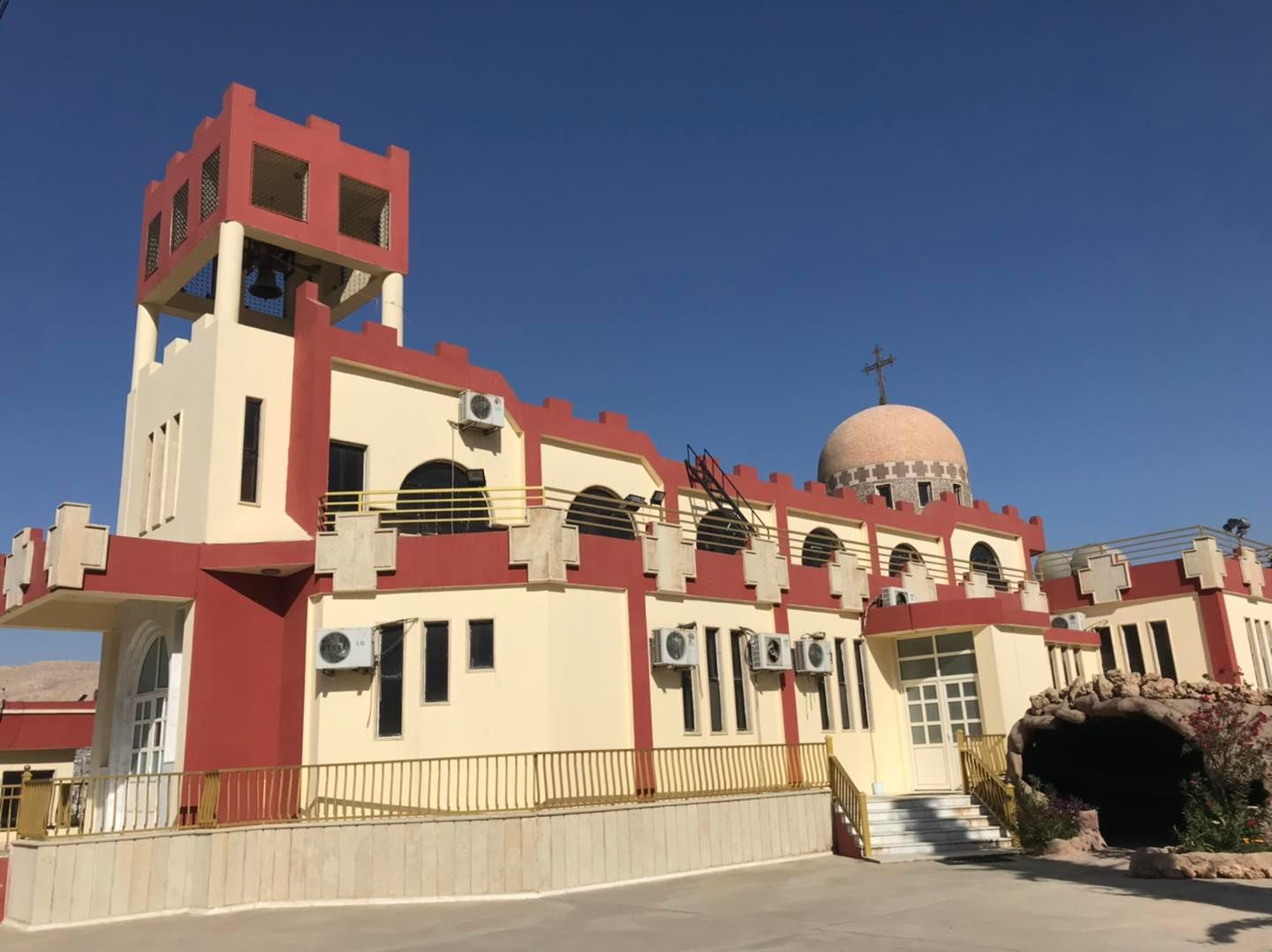
- Top-bottom, R-L: View over Dohuk; American University of Kurdistan, Dohuk • Sharansh Waterfall; Dohuk at night • Assyrian Mar Narsai Church

- Location within Iraq
- Coordinates: 36°52′N 43°0′E
- Country: Iraq
- Federal region: Kurdistan Region
- Governorate: Duhok Governorate
- District: Duhok District

Government
  - Governor: Ali Tatar

Area
  - Total: 577 km^{2} (223 sq mi)
- Elevation: 565 m (1,854 ft)

Population
  - Estimate (2018): 340,871
- Time zone: UTC+3 (Arabian Standard Time)
- Postcode: 42001
- Area code: 062
- Website: duhok.gov.krd

Duhok (Kurdish: دهۆک, romanized: Dihok; Arabic: دهوك, romanized: Dohūk; Syriac: ܒܝܬ ܢܘܗܕܪܐ, romanized: Beth Nohadra, Lishanid Noshan: דוהוך, romanized: Dohok) is a city in Kurdistan Region, Iraq and the capital city of Duhok Governorate.

== Name ==
The city of Duhok received its name from the Kurdish words 'du' (two) and 'hok' (lump) as a tax payment of two lumps from the basket of each passing caravan that often carry wheat and barley. According to a tradition presented by Sasson Nahum, Duhok was initially named Duhok-e Dasinya, signifying "Duhok of the Yezidis". However, after a massacre of the Yezidis, the town was abandoned, leading to the settlement of Muslims, Christians, and Jews in the area.

== Demographics ==
The city is home to diverse ethnic groups, with Kurds forming the majority, while other minorities include Assyrians, Yazidis, Armenians, and Arabs. The city also hosts tens of thousands of refugees from Syria, mostly Syrian Kurds, and internally displaced persons (IDPs), most of whom are Yazidis and Assyrians who fled after ISIS took control of Sinjar and Mosul, Iraq.

According to the Kurdistan Regional Government, as of March 2024, the Kurdistan Region hosts 631,174 IDPs, with 40% of them living in Duhok Governorate. Additionally, there are 251,475 Syrian refugees, of which 131,700 (as of 2022) reside in Duhok Governorate.

== History ==
One of the earliest written references to Duhok appears in the late 15th-century Persian chronicle Kitab-i Diyarbakriyya by Abu Bakr Tihrani, which mentions Duhok in accounts of Aq Qoyunlu military campaigns.

According to historical sources, Duhok served as the center of the Yazidi principality of Dasini (Sheikhan) until the 16th century, with the mountain overlooking the city known as "Mount Dasin". Following the foundation of the Safavid Empire in 1501 and its subsequent expansion into Kurdistan, the region came under Safavid authority after the capture of Diyarbakir and Mosul in 1508. The Mir of Bahdinan, Hasan ibn Seyf al-Din, was commissioned by Shah Ismail to assist in the capture of Duhok fortress from the Dasini tribe, after which the city passed to the control of the Bahdinan emirate. As observed by Evliya Çelebi in Seyahatnâme (Book of Travels), Bahdinan was divided into: Akre, Zaxo, Shixoyi, Duhok, Zibari, and Muzuri.

In 1820, Rich described Duhok as a small town comprising 300 houses, serving as the principal site for the Doski tribe, accompanied by eighty additional villages. The missionary Henry Aaron Stern (1851) observed Dohuk's diverse population, which included Jewish residents. Stern further noted that the kiahya, or village mayor, was an Assyrian Christian of Chaldean Catholic affiliation. By 1859, Rabbi Yehiel found two minyans of Jews in the area. The Muslim and Assyrian Christian communities comprised around a hundred households. Stern also mentioned the large Yazidi population at the time, as well as the fact that it was initially called "Dohuk-e-Dasiniya", i.e. Duhok of the Yazidis, potentially implying that it was founded or heavily influenced by Yazidis.

In 1929, the settled population reached approximately 3,500 inhabitants, with Kurds forming the majority. Among the 550 households, 65 were Assyrian Christian, and 30 were Jewish.

=== Modern times ===
The University of Duhok was founded on 31 October 1992.

In March 2024, an ancient Assyrian archaeological site was vandalized with Islamist slogans. This incident drew criticism from the Assyrian community, in line with the Kurdistan Region's ongoing failure to preserve their ancient artifacts. Notably, in 2016, the Halamata reliefs were spray-painted with the Kurdish flag and subsequently stolen.

On 1 April 2025, during the Kha b-Nisan (Assyrian New Year) parade in downtown Duhok, a man armed with an axe attacked Assyrians celebrating the event while shouting Islamist slogans, injuring a 17-year-old boy and a 75-year-old woman. The assailant, later identified as a Syrian Kurdish national affiliated with the Islamic State, was quickly subdued by nearby Assyrians. The incident was described as a terrorist attack by the Assyrian deputy governor.

== Culture ==
The culture of the city of Duhok reflects the city's diverse ethnic and religious composition, alongside significant Assyrian and Yazidi communities.

=== Festivals and celebrations ===
==== Newroz (Kurdish New Year) ====
Newroz is celebrated annually on the 21st of March and marks the first day of spring. The festival of Newroz holds deep cultural significance for the Kurds, symbolizing freedom and resistance.

In Duhok, Newroz is celebrated with large public gatherings, traditional Kurdish music (most notably songs of Hesen Zîrek), folk dancing such as halparke, and family picnics. Residents wear traditional Kurdish clothes and prepare festive meals to share with family and neighbors.

The celebration of Newroz is connected to Duhok's history. During the Kurdish uprisings of 1991, the people of Duhok, alongside Peshmerga, liberated the city and won against the Ba’athist regime on 14 March 1991. This victory paved the way for the lighting of the Newroz flame seven days later, on 21 March 1991.

In 2025, thousands of residents celebrated Newroz after the postponed due to overlapping with Ramadan and Eid-Al Fitr. Families pitched tents in valleys and mountains across the city, joining in traditional dancing, music, and meals. Large crowds were recorded in Duhok and the governorate as locals embraced the spring weather.

==== Akitu (Assyrian New Year) ====
Duhok hosts major celebrations for the Akitu festival, marking the Assyrian New Year. The festival, dating back to the 5th millennium BCE, is celebrated annually on the 1st of April. The festive procession kicks off in front of the Virgin Mary Church in Duhok, with participants marching to the celebration venue. During the march, attendees wave flags and banners, perform traditional folk dances, and showcase Assyrian heritage and customs.

In 2025, thousands of Assyrians from Iraq and across the diaspora took part of the celebrations in Duhok. Ninos Odisho, a member of the organizing committee, stated that the event aimed to send a clear message to the Assyrians who remain rooted in their homeland.

==== Duhok Provincial Festival ====
In May 2025, Duhok hosted the 11th edition of its annual provincial festival, drawing thousands from the Kurdistan Region and Iraq. The festival turned the city into a showcase of heritage, culture, and pride. Local folklore troupes performed traditional dabka dances, while singers echoed melodies rooted in the region's multiethnic legacy.

The festival also honored the area's rich folklore, with dozens of ensembles presenting scenes from daily life, weddings, and rituals across the diverse communities of Duhok. Government departments, NGOs, and private companies erected pavilions across the Nowruz Square to display projects and local initiatives.

==== Kurdish food festival ====
In October 2025, Duhok hosted a festival showcasing traditional Kurdish cuisine, coinciding with World Food Day. Participants across the governorate of Duhok displayed a wide range of Kurdish food products and handmade crafts reflecting the region's cultural identity.

Khalil Mahmoud, mayor of the Semel District, stated that "the goal of the festival was to introduce younger generations to the traditional Kurdish cuisine and preserve the region’s culture." Participants prepared traditional dishes such as dolma, sour kubba, yogurt kubba, and rice with chickpeas.

=== Music ===
Duhok has a rich musical heritage dating to the 1970s. The Tipa Duhok band, a band in Duhok, became one of the most famous bands in Iraq. Its song "Nergiz-Nergiz" was popular throughout Iraq. The band kept continuing until 2014, where due to the war with ISIS, the federal government of Iraq had to cut Kurdistan's budget, hence the band was forced to suspend its work.

Notable musicians from Duhok include Kurdish musician and composer Dilshad Said, as well as Dastor (Mohammed Salah), a Kurdish singer known for his work in rap and pop music, who has also produced more than 100 tracks.

Music in Duhok has gone through many phases. The period from 2003 to 2013 is considered the golden age of music for Duhok. The rise of ISIS and financial difficulties in the Kurdistan Region negatively affected the music industry.

=== Arts and galleries ===
The Duhok Gallery was opened in 1998 by the Directorate of Culture in Duhok. The gallery, located in the city centre, has showcased many public and personal exhibitions since its opening.

In January 2019, the gallery hosted its 14th annual exhibition, showcasing over a hundred new pieces of art created by artists across the region. Artists from Kurdish cities, such as Duhok, Erbil, Sulaymaniyah, Halabja, and Kirkuk participated in the exhibition.

=== Museums ===
Duhok is home to many museums preserving the region's cultural heritage. One of these museums is the Duhok Cultural Museum, located inside the Duhok Directorate of Culture and Arts building. The museum was founded in 1998 by Rafaat Rajab, who was behind its success until his death in 2019. The museum features many artifacts representing the culture of coexistence in the region. Kurds, Assyrians, Christians, Yazidis, and Arabs all have a unique cultural history represented by these artifacts. The exhibits in the museum mainly feature the old, agricultural life that was present back then in the region. There were herbs that were used for medicine and food, traditional clothes, pottery, carpentry, and household items that were in use for a long time. Many collectors of old artifacts helped the museum by donating their well-preserved items. Some of the items are even more than 500 years old.

In Khanke, a town south of Duhok, a local resident named Ivan Haji single-handedly founded a museum, spending over six years collecting thousands of precious artifacts that tell the story of his community's heritage. The museum features Kurdish textiles, vintage cameras, old phones, typewriters, traditional instruments, intricately woven bags, and old farming tools.

== Archaeology ==
Seven kilometers southwest of Duhok, Halamata Cave is an archaeological site containing the Assyrian relief carvings known as the Maltai Reliefs, associated with the northern canal system built by the Assyrian king Sennacherib (r. 704–681 BC) to carry water to his capital city of Nineveh".

In 2020, researchers discovered in the Balyuz hills, ten kilometers west of Duhok City, an ancient tablet with Greek inscription which dates back to 165 BC. The inscriptions refer to Demetrius, the region's ruler during that time.

== Climate ==
According to the Köppen-Geiger climate classification system, Duhok, like most of Upper Mesopotamia, has a hot-summer Mediterranean climate (Csa) featuring sweltering, virtually rainless summers and cool to cold, wet winters. Precipitation falls in the cooler months, being heaviest in late winter and early spring. The city experiences around two or three snowy days yearly, with more severe falls in the uplands. Summers are virtually rainless, with rain returning in late autumn.

Climate data for Duhok, Iraq
Month	Jan	Feb	Mar	Apr	May	Jun	Jul	Aug	Sep	Oct	Nov	Dec	Year
Record high °C (°F)	20 (68)	27 (81)	30 (86)	34 (93)	38 (100)	41 (106)	45 (113)	46 (115)	44 (111)	39 (102)	31 (88)	24 (75)	46 (115)
Mean daily maximum °C (°F)	11 (52)	14 (57)	19 (66)	24 (75)	32 (90)	38 (100)	42 (108)	41 (106)	37 (99)	29 (84)	20 (68)	13 (55)	27 (80)
Daily mean °C (°F)	7 (45)	10 (50)	14 (57)	18 (64)	25 (77)	31 (88)	34 (93)	34 (93)	29 (84)	22 (72)	14 (57)	9 (48)	21 (69)
Mean daily minimum °C (°F)	3 (37)	5 (41)	9 (48)	13 (55)	18 (64)	23 (73)	27 (81)	26 (79)	21 (70)	15 (59)	8 (46)	6 (43)	15 (58)
Record low °C (°F)	−4 (25)	−6 (21)	−1 (30)	3 (37)	6 (43)	10 (50)	13 (55)	17 (63)	11 (52)	4 (39)	−2 (28)	−2 (28)	−6 (21)
Average precipitation mm (inches)	92.2 (3.63)	99.3 (3.91)	105 (4.1)	96.4 (3.80)	44.3 (1.74)	4.9 (0.19)	0.1 (0.00)	0.1 (0.00)	2.1 (0.08)	36 (1.4)	68.9 (2.71)	95.8 (3.77)	645.1 (25.33)
Average precipitation days	13.1	11.5	12.2	12	7.6	2.5	3.3	3.6	3.1	6.1	8	10.2	93.2
Average snowy days	1	0	0	0	0	0	0	0	0	0	0	0	1
Average relative humidity (%)	72.4	69.4	64.5	60.2	46	30.5	25.8	26.7	30.6	46.8	62.9	72.9	50.7
Average dew point °C (°F)	−0.1 (31.8)	1.0 (33.8)	3.8 (38.8)	7.5 (45.5)	9.2 (48.6)	8.2 (46.8)	9.2 (48.6)	9.1 (48.4)	7.6 (45.7)	7.6 (45.7)	5.2 (41.4)	2.0 (35.6)	5.9 (42.6)
Percentage possible sunshine	50.1	53.2	56.4	57.8	70.2	89.8	95.2	94.4	90.5	71.8	59.5	50.1	69.9
Source 1: My Forecast
Source 2: Weatherbase (precipitation-precip days-humidity-dew point-sun)

== Transport ==
=== Road networks ===
Duhok is connected to major cities of the Kurdistan Region via a network of highways and regional roads. The ninth cabinet of the Kurdistan Region has prioritized road development, with significant development across the governorate, with 212 road and bridge projects completed in 2024.

One of these projects is The Ba’adre-Etit Strategic Highway Project, a 26-kilometer road project in the Duhok Governorate. Once this project finishes, the entire Erbil-Duhok road will be a modern dual carriageway, improving connectivity and supporting economic, trade, and tourism development across the region.

Another project is the Duhok-Semel Road Project, which was completed in January 2025. This road connects the city of Duhok to the Semel District. The road serves as an example for necessary infrastructure development and has provided convenience for those moving between the places of Duhok and Semel.

The Development Road Project is a major road planned to span 1,200 kilometers, beginning at the Faw Peninsula in Basra and ending at the Iraq-Turkey border. The Duhok Governorate is key in this project, with the route passing through the Zakho District, which is administered by the governorate. Erbil and Baghdad have agreed on the most efficient route for the project, which will run from Basra to Duhok and then to Turkey. The selected route also runs from Rabia to Faysh Khabur and then to the Turkish border. The project is scheduled to begin construction in 2026.

=== Public transportation ===
Public transportation in Duhok mainly consists of taxis and shared vans (locally known as "sarbis"). In May 2025, Duhok introduced its first electric taxi, with the government waiving additional registration fees to encourage more electric vehicles.

Buses are also available, however are mostly available for inter-city travel, with regular services operating from Istanbul, Mardin, and Cizre in Turkey.

There are no metros or tramways currently operating in Duhok, however, an academic study has proposed a light rail system to help reduce traffic congestion in the city.

== Notable people ==
- Haviv Shimoni (1933–1994), politician
- Yitzhak Mordechai (born 1944), general and politician
- Karim Findi (born 1946) Kurdish author and writer
- Tamar Fattah Ramadhan Kuchar (?), politician
- Nimrud Baito (born 1952), politician
- Janan Sawa (born 1956), musician
- Dalshad Said (born 1958), musician
- Pascal Esho Warda (born 1961), Assyrian politician and former Minister of Immigration and Refugees in Iraq
- Basima Abdulrahman
- Fadhil Barwari (1966–2018), military officer
- Sami Khoshaba Latchin, sleeper agent of the Iraqi government
- Hogir Hirori (born 1980), film director
- Khalid Mushir (born 1981), footballer
- Jassim Mohammed Haji (born 1984), footballer
- Salih Jaber (born 1985), footballer
- Bina Qeredaxi (born 1988), Kurdish filmmaker and media promoter from Iraq
- Kovan Abdulraheem (born 1988), Paralympic athlete
- Shahyan Tahseen (born 1988) Kurdish news anchor and TV presenter
- Helket Idris Abid (born 1988), Kurdish director, writer, actor and journalist
- Kurdwin Ayub (born 1990) Kurdish-Austrian filmmaker
- Zana Allée (born 1994), footballer
- Rewan Amin (born 1996), footballer
- Ahmad Allée (born 1996), footballer

== See also ==
- List of largest cities of Iraq
- Duhok Dam
- Duhok International
