= Helket Idris Abid =

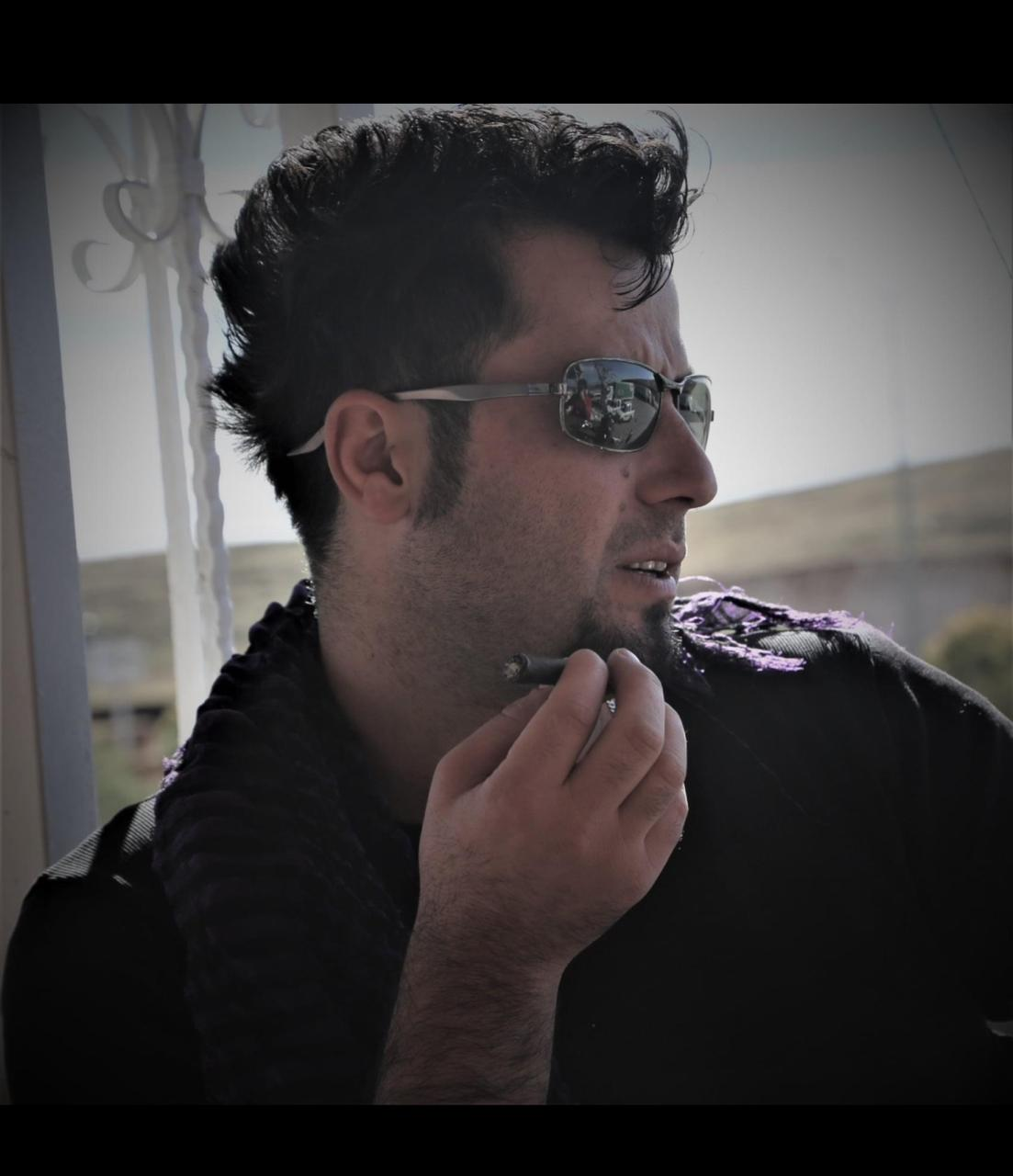
- Helket in 2015
- Born: June 28, 1988 (age 38); Simel, Duhok Governorate, Kurdistan Region, Iraq
- Education: University of Duhok, Artuklu University (Turkey)
- Occupations: Writer, director, actor, journalist, lecturer
- Years active: 2009–present
- Awards: Best Playwright Awards in Kurdistan, Iran, and Turkey

Helket Idris Abid (born June 28, 1988, in Simel, Duhok Governorate) is a Kurdish writer, director, actor, and journalist from the Kurdistan Region of Iraq.

== Early life and education ==
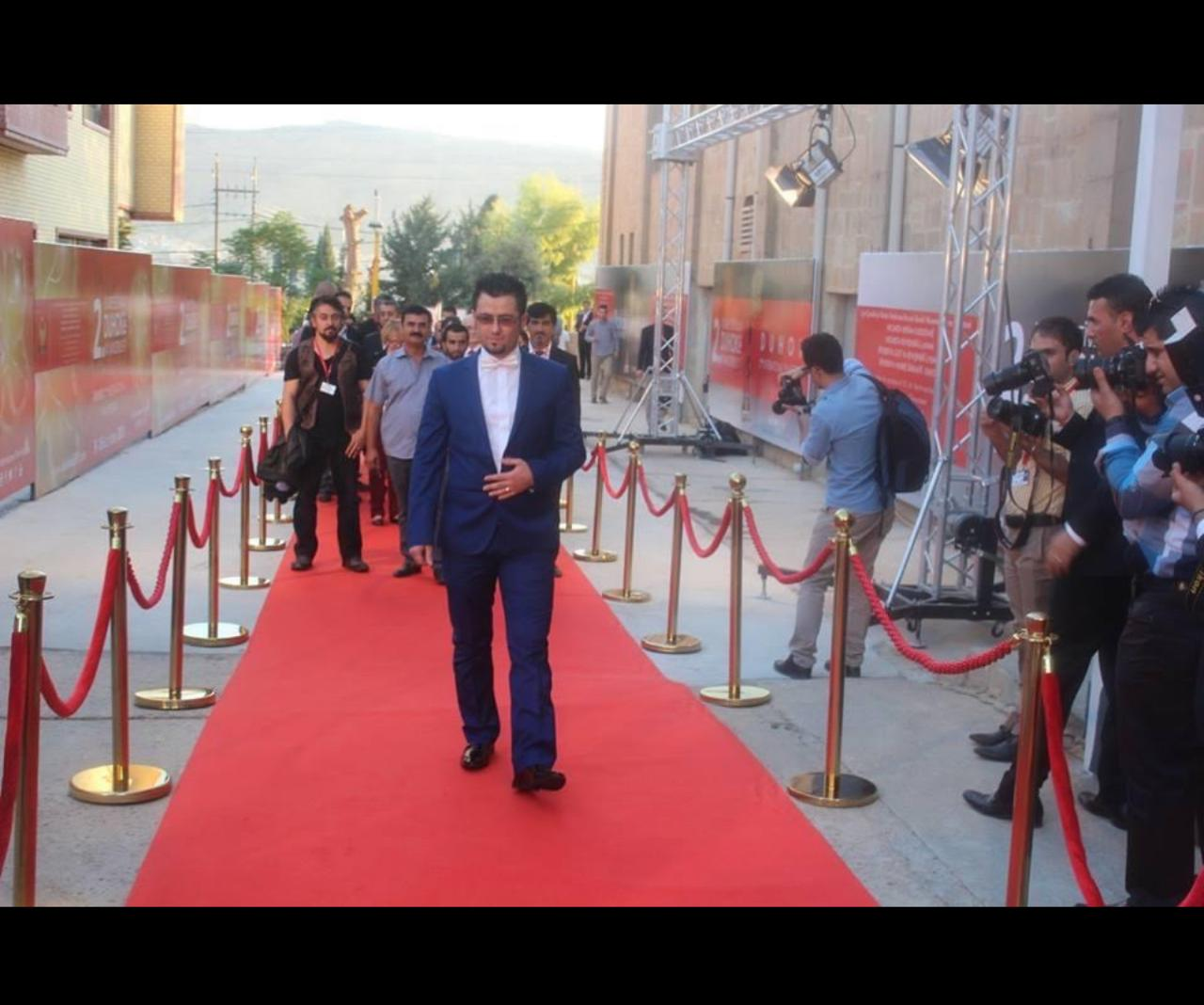
Duhok international film festival 2013

Helket Idris Abid was born in Simele, Duhok Governorate in 1988. He completed primary and secondary education at Shahidan School in Simel. He graduated in 2009 from the Department of Theater at the Duhok Institute of Fine Arts and earned a bachelor's degree in theater from the University of Duhok in 2013. He received a master's degree in Kurdish Studies from Mardin Artuklu University in Turkey in 2021.

== Career ==
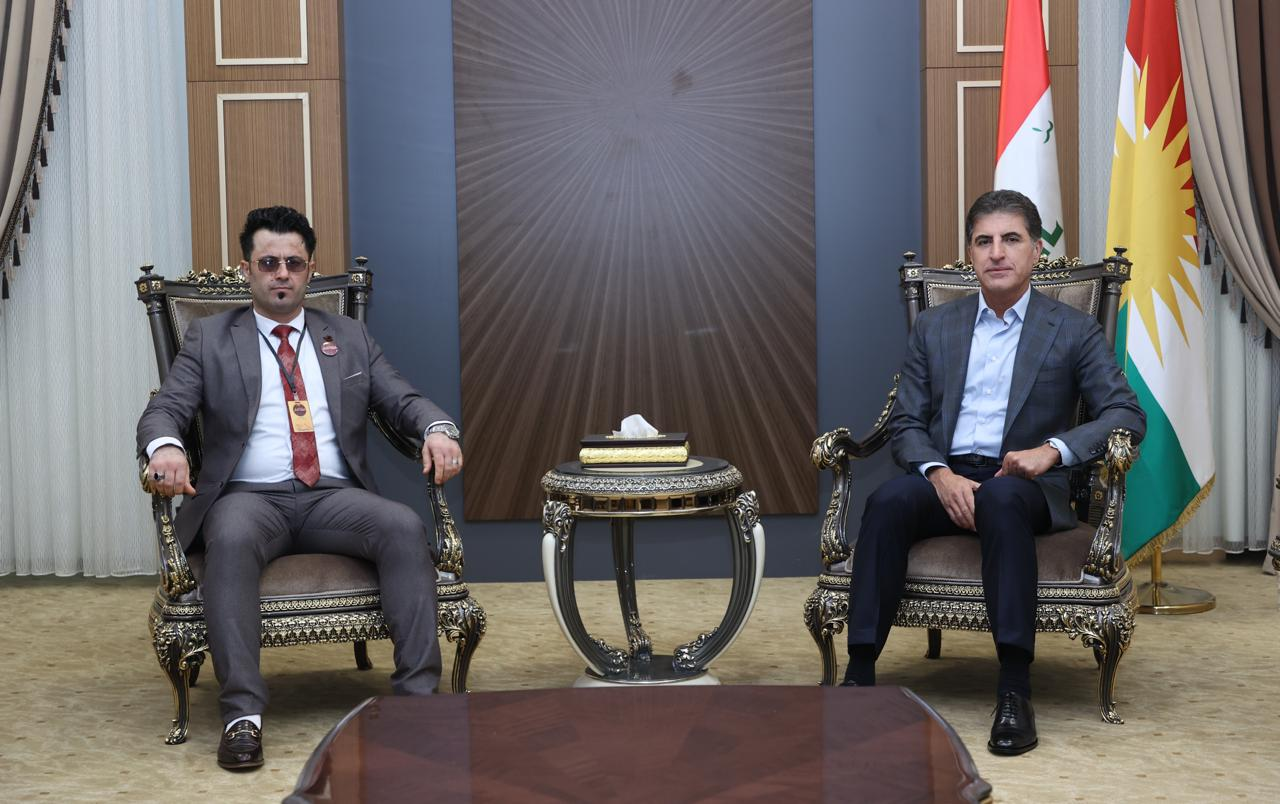
with Nechirvan Barzani

Abid has written several plays and participated as an actor in films and television dramas. He produced the television program Kurd in Russia in 2020 for Waar TV. n 2022, he was received by the US Consulate General in Erbil, which announced their support for his work and activities. And He also wrote the play The Kurdistan Epic, which was performed on 11 September 2024, in the presence of the President of the Kurdistan Region of Iraq, Nechirvan Barzani.

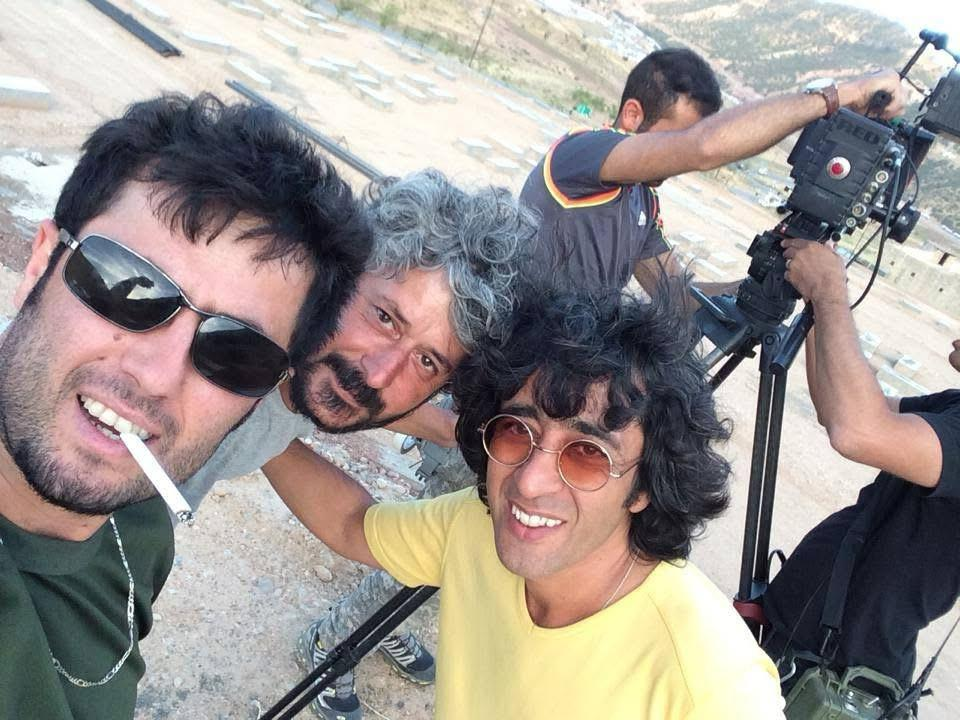
On the set of The Dark Wind in 2015

He is a member of the Kurdish Writers' Union and the Kurdish Artists' Union.

== Awards ==
- Best Playwright Award – Sulemani Theater Festival 2011
- Best Playwright Award – Saqqez Festival, Iran (2024]
- Best Playwright Award – Erbil (2019)
- Best Street Theater Director Award – Soran (2021)

== Published works ==
- A Dream Outside the Cage (2011)
- Anahita and Gemivan (2012); second edition 2023 in Istanbul
- My Mother Grave (2021)
- Anahita and gemivan Translated into Arabic by Ramina Publishing House London
- An academic study on the book A Dream Outside the Circle by Dr. Abdulrahman Hassan

== Theater and film ==
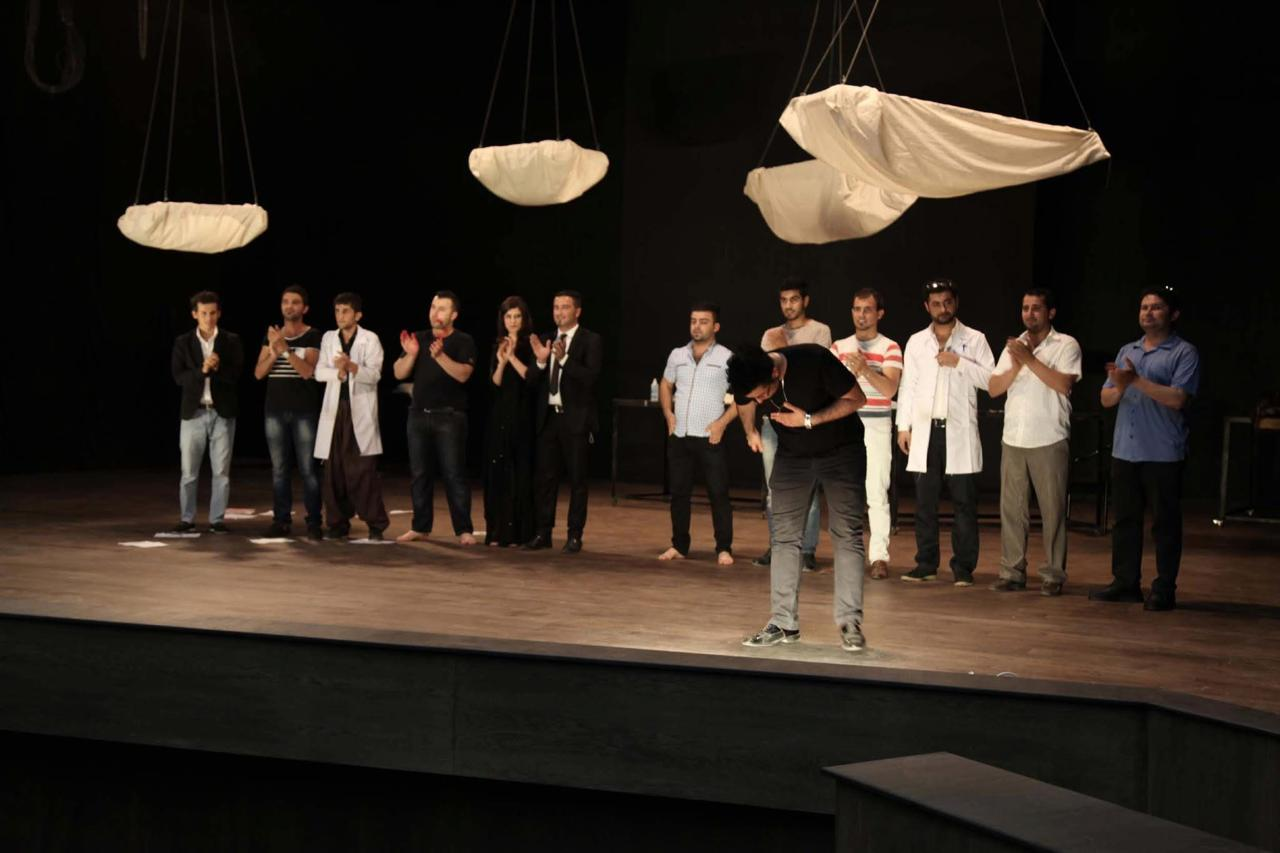
theater 2013

- Actor in the feature film House Without Roof (2016)
- Actor and casting director in the feature film Reseba: The Dark Wind (2016)
- TV drama Vekolin (2020)
- Several plays authored by him, including Bochi Mar (2013), A Scene in the Gas (2015), A Scene of Killing (2016), Who Is Leaving? (2021)
