= FIPP =

FIPP (formally the Fédération Internationale de la Presse Périodique, English: International Federation of Periodical Publishers) is a global trade association, whose purpose is to improve all aspects of the media content industry through the sharing of knowledge, mutual co-operation, and strategic partnerships. FIPP membership comprises 700 enterprises, including nearly 60 national magazine associations.

FIPP is known for producing the annual World Magazine Trends Report, which is distributed worldwide throughout the industry and is a respected source of reference.

Although its headquarters are in London, FIPP hosts a World Magazine Congress every two years in various countries around the world. The 2017 World Magazine Congress was held in London in October 2017. The organisation co-hosts the Digital Innovators' Summit, held annually in Berlin.

In recent years, FIPP has been promoting the growth of 'cross-border magazines', where a magazine based in one country expands into other territories.

In December 2025, FIPP announced it will merge into the World Association of Newspapers and News Publishers.
