= 2015–16 Al-Talaba SC season =

Al-Talaba
2015–16 season
- President Honorary President: Alaa Kadhim; Hussein al-Shahristani
- Manager: Ayoub Odisho
- Stadium: Al-Quwa Al-Jawiya Stadium (September 2015–April 2016); Al-Shaab Stadium (April–May 2016)
- Iraqi Premier League: 3rd – Final stage
- Top goalscorer: League: Abdul-Qadir Tariq (10); All: Abdul-Qadir Tariq (10)
Home colours	Away colours	Third colours

The 2015–16 season was Al-Talaba Sports Club's 41st consecutive season in the Iraqi Premier League, the top-flight of Iraqi football. Having finished in 5th of Group 2 in the previous season, and having withdrawn from the Iraq FA Cup, Al-Talaba only competed in the Iraqi Premier League.

In the first stage of the league, Al-Talaba were inconsistent in their results, finishing in 4th place of the Group 1 table at 27 points with seven wins, six draws, four losses and a goal difference of +6. In the second stage, Al-Talaba lost their first match against Al-Shorta and before clinching a win against Al-Quwa Al-Jawiya. After drawing with the league leaders, Al-Zawra'a and the defending champions, Naft Al-Wasat, they won against Al-Mina'a which could have led them from 3rd to 2nd before drawing the next match with Al-Naft. They won their last match against Baghdad to remain in their position of 3rd in the league after three wins, three draws, a loss, at 12 points.

== Kit ==
Period	Home colours	Away colours	Third colours	Supplier
September 2015 – February 2016				Nike
February 2016 – April 2016				Nike
April 2016				Record Sport
April 2016 – May 2016				Record Sport, Nike

== Players ==
=== Squad information ===
As of 31 January 2016

Note: Flags indicate national team as defined under FIFA eligibility rules; some limited exceptions apply. Players may hold more than one non-FIFA nationality.

No.	Pos.	Nation	Player
1	GK	IRQ	Saif Jameel
2	DF	SYR	Saad Hassan
3	DF	IRQ	Saad Jassim
4	DF	IRQ	Mohammed Abdul-Zahra (3rd captain)
5	MF	IRQ	Muthana Khalid
6	MF	IRQ	Mohammed Mtashar
7	MF	IRQ	Sajjad Jassim
8	MF	IRQ	Mustafa Al-Ameen
9	FW	IRQ	Younis Mahmoud (captain)
10	FW	IRQ	Abdul-Qadir Tariq
11	FW	IRQ	Amjad Abbas
12	GK	IRQ	Ali Abd Laftah
13	MF	SYR	Thaer Kroma
14	DF	IRQ	Abbas Ayyad
15	MF	IRQ	Yousif Nabeel
16	FW	IRQ	Yassir Abdul-Mohsen
17	MF	IRQ	Ihab Kadhim
18	MF	IRQ	Mahdi Karim (vice-captain)

No.	Pos.	Nation	Player
19	FW	IRQ	Mustafa Ali Nima
20	MF	IRQ	Ahmed Ali Hussein
21	FW	IRQ	Alaa Muhaisin
22	MF	IRQ	Samer Saeed
23	GK	IRQ	Muhannad Jabbar
24	MF	IRQ	Muthana Khalid
25	MF	IRQ	Aqeel Abbas Jabur
26	DF	IRQ	Hassan Abbas
27	FW	IRQ	Karrar Ali Dodah
28	DF	IRQ	Haider Ali Abid
31	FW	SYR	Abdul-Latif Salqini
32	DF	IRQ	Ali Hussein Ali
33	DF	SYR	Moayad Al-Khouli
34	DF	IRQ	Haider Ali Kadhim
35	GK	IRQ	Ali Abdul-Muhsin
37	MF	IRQ	Mustafa Mohammed
38	FW	GHA	James Abban
39	DF	IRQ	Ahmed Nadhim

==== On loan ====
Note: Flags indicate national team as defined under FIFA eligibility rules; some limited exceptions apply. Players may hold more than one non-FIFA nationality.

No.	Pos.	Nation	Player
—	FW	IRQ	Ali Rasheed (at Al-Karkh until 30 June 2016)

=== Players In ===
N	Date	Pos	Player	Moving from	Type	Transfer window
20	12 July 2015	MF	(Iraq) Ahmed Ali Hussein	(Iraq) Al-Hedood	Transfer	Summer
28	12 July 2015	DF	(Iraq) Haider Ali Abid	(Iraq) Al-Karkh	Transfer	Summer
11	14 July 2015	FW	(Iraq) Amjad Abbas	(Oman) Ahli Sidab	Transfer	Summer
7	26 July 2015	MF	(Iraq) Sajjad Jassim	(Iraq) Najaf	Transfer	Summer
10	29 July 2015	FW	(Iraq) Abdul-Qadir Tariq	(Iraq) Al-Karkh	Transfer	Summer
34	29 July 2015	DF	(Iraq) Haider Ali Kadhim	(Iraq) Zakho	Transfer	Summer
16	30 July 2015	FW	(Iraq) Yassir Abdul-Mohsen	(Iraq) Zakho	Transfer	Summer
18	1 August 2015	DF	(Iraq) Mahdi Karim	(Iraq) Al-Shorta	Transfer	Summer
8	1 August 2015	MF	(Iraq) Mustafa Al-Ameen	(Iraq) Naft Maysan	Transfer	Summer
27	1 August 2015	FW	(Iraq) Karrar Ali Dodah	(Iraq) Sulaymaniyah	Transfer	Summer
4	12 August 2015	DF	(Iraq) Mohammed Abdul-Zahra	(Iraq) Al-Sinaa	Transfer	Summer
3	12 August 2015	DF	(Iraq) Saad Jassim	(Iraq) Zakho	Transfer	Summer
1	12 August 2015	GK	(Iraq) Saif Jameel	(Iraq) Al-Shorta	Transfer	Summer
17	12 August 2015	MF	(Iraq) Ihab Kadhim	(Iraq) Al-Quwa Al-Jawiya	Transfer	Summer
15	16 August 2015	MF	(Iraq) Yousif Nabeel	(Iraq) Al-Kahraba	Transfer	Summer
13	6 September 2015	MF	(Syria) Thaer Kroma	(Syria) Al-Wahda	Transfer	Summer
31	6 September 2015	FW	(Syria) Abdul-Latif Salqini	(Syria) Al-Jaish	Transfer	Summer
33	6 September 2015	DF	(Syria) Moayad Al-Khouli	(Syria) Al-Jaish	Transfer	Summer
9	18 September 2015	FW	(Iraq) Younis Mahmoud	Unattached	Free	Mid-season
22	16 November 2015	MF	(Iraq) Samer Saeed	(Iraq) Al-Karkh	Transfer	Mid-season
37	30 November 2015	MF	(Iraq) Mustafa Mohammed	(Iraq) Al-Shorta	Transfer	Mid-season
38	12 December 2015	FW	(Ghana) James Abban	(Ghana) Aduana Stars	Transfer	Mid-season
39	7 January 2016	DF	(Iraq) Ahmed Nadhim	(Iraq) Naft Al-Janoob	Transfer	Winter
5	12 January 2016	MF	(Iraq) Muthana Khalid	(Iraq) Baghdad	Transfer	Winter
2	31 January 2016	DF	(Syria) Saad Hassan	(Syria) Al-Jaish	Transfer	Winter

=== Players Out ===
Date	Pos	Player	Moving to	Type	Transfer window
15 July 2015	DF	(Iraq) Nozad Abdul-Hameed	(Iraq) Al-Karkh	End of contract	Summer
15 July 2015	FW	(Cameroon) Sayyid Arafat	Unattached	End of contract	Summer
15 July 2015	DF	(Iraq) Mohammed Saeed	Unattached	End of contract	Summer
15 July 2015	MF	(Iraq) Karrar Salih	Unattached	End of contract	Summer
15 July 2015	MF	(Iraq) Sadiq Abbas	Unattached	End of contract	Summer
15 July 2015	MF	(Iraq) Yousif Dhaidan	Unattached	End of contract	Summer
15 July 2015	MF	(Iraq) Ali Faez Qasim	(Iraq) Naft Maysan	Transfer	Summer
15 July 2015	FW	(Iraq) Ali Rasheed	(Iraq) Al-Karkh	Loan	Summer
15 July 2015	DF	(Iraq) Adnan Atiya	Unattached	End of contract	Summer
15 July 2015	DF	(Iraq) Mohammed Abdul-Zahra	(Iraq) Al-Sinaa	Transfer	Summer
15 July 2015	DF	(Iraq) Adnan Atiya	Unattached	End of contract	Summer
15 July 2015	GC	(Iraq) Badir Shakir	Unattached	End of contract	Summer
15 July 2015	MF	(Iraq) Thamir Fouad	Unattached	End of contract	Summer
15 July 2015	DF	(Iraq) Salah Hilal	Unattached	End of contract	Summer
15 July 2015	MF	(Iraq) Hassan Attwan	Unattached	End of contract	Summer
15 July 2015	MF	(Egypt) Al-Habib Mohammed	Unattached	End of contract	Summer
15 July 2015	DF	(Iraq) Mohammed Ali Karim	(Iraq) Al-Quwa Al-Jawiya	End of contract	Summer
15 July 2015	MF	(Iraq) Wisam Zaki	Unattached	End of contract	Summer
15 July 2015	AM	(Iraq) Ahmed Kadhim Assad	Unattached	End of contract	Summer
16 July 2015	FW	(Iraq) Ali Salah Hashim	(Iraq) Zakho	Transfer	Summer
21 July 2015	MF	(Iraq) Salih Sadir	(Iraq) Naft Al-Wasat	Transfer	Summer
22 July 2015	AM	(Iraq) Nawaf Slall	Unattached	End of contract	Summer
22 July 2015	MF	(Iraq) Mustafa Hussein	Unattached	End of contract	Summer
22 July 2015	DF	(Iraq) Majeed Hameed	Unattached	End of contract	Summer
23 July 2015	DF	(Iraq) Waleed Bahar	(Iraq) Al-Naft	Transfer	Summer
23 July 2015	DF	(Iraq) Mohammed Jabbar Rubat	(Iraq) Naft Al-Janoob	Transfer	Summer
26 July 2015	MF	(Egypt) Mustafa Jalal	(Egypt) Wadi Degla	Transfer	Summer
26 July 2015	MF	(Iraq) Ahmed Jabbar	(Iraq) Al-Mina'a	Transfer	Summer
12 August 2015	GK	(Iraq) Muhannad Qassim	(Iraq) Baghdad	Transfer	Summer
12 August 2015	DF	(Iraq) Ahmed Khalid	Unattached	End of contract	Summer
12 August 2015	DF	(Iraq) Ahmed Essa	(Iraq) Al-Zawra'a	Transfer	Summer
5 December 2015	MF	(Iraq) Osama Ali	(Iraq) Al-Quwa Al-Jawiya	Transfer	Winter

== Technical staff ==
As of 7 June 2015

Position	Staff
Head coach	Ayoub Odisho
Assistant coach	Hassan Turki
Assistant coach	Kareem Salman
Assistant coach	Sadiq Saadoun
Goalkeeping coach	Hisham Ali

== Statistics ==
=== Top scorers ===
Rank	Pos.	No.	Name	Iraqi Premier League	Total
1	FW	10	(Iraq) Abdul-Qadir Tariq	10	10
2	FW	9	(Iraq) Younis Mahmoud	3	3
3	FW	16	(Iraq) Yassir Abdul-Mohsen	2	2
3	FW	38	(Ghana) James Abban	2	2
3	MF	13	(Syria) Thaer Kroma	2	2
4	FW	31	(Syria) Abdul-Latif Salqini	1	1
4	FW	27	(Iraq) Karrar Ali Dodah	1	1
4	MF	8	(Iraq) Mustafa Al-Ameen	1	1
4	MF	22	(Iraq) Samer Saeed	1	1
4	DF	4	(Iraq) Mohammed Abdul-Zahra	1	1
4	DF	18	(Iraq) Mahdi Karim	1	1
4	DF	2	(Syria) Saad Hassan	1	1
4	DF	39	(Iraq) Ahmed Nadhim	1	1
Own goals				1	1
Total				28	28

=== Captains ===
Rank	Pos.	No.	Name	Starts
1	FW	9	(Iraq) Younis Mahmoud	13
2	DF	18	(Iraq) Mahdi Karim	6
3	DF	4	(Iraq) Mohammed Abdul-Zahra	5
Total				24

=== Penalties ===
Date	Name	Opponent	Result
21 October 2015	(Iraq) Abdul-Qadir Tariq	Al-Karkh	✓
28 February 2016	(Iraq) Mahdi Karim	Samawa	✓

== Friendlies ==
Win Draw Loss

24 December 2015 Friendly	Al-Sinaa	0–1	Al-Talaba	Baghdad
7:00 UTC+03:00			Jassim	Stadium: Al-Sinaa Stadium

15 January 2016 Friendly	Al-Talaba	1–2	Al-Shorta	Baghdad
14:30 UTC+03:00	Tariq (pen.)		Chammari; Hussein	Stadium: University of Baghdad Stadium

28 January 2016 Friendly	Al-Shorta	0–0	Al-Talaba	Baghdad
				Stadium: Al-Sinaa Stadium

9 February 2016 Friendly	Al-Kahraba	2–1	Al-Talaba	Baghdad
14:00 UTC+03:00				Stadium: Al Kahraba Stadium

21 March 2016 Friendly	Al-Talaba	0–0	Al-Hussein	Baghdad
14:30 UTC+03:00				Stadium: University of Baghdad Stadium

23 March 2016 Friendly	Al-Talaba	4–0	Haifa	Baghdad
15:15 UTC+03:00	Abdul-Mohsen 10'; Karim 25'; Jassim 40'; Nima 80'			Stadium: University of Baghdad Stadium

27 March 2016 Friendly	Al-Talaba	1–1	Baghdad	Baghdad
14:30 UTC+03:00	Karim 36'		Agha 89'	Stadium: Baghdad Stadium

3 May 2016 Friendly	Al-Talaba	0–1	Al-Shorta	Baghdad
16:00 UTC+03:00			Faez 62'	Stadium: University of Baghdad Stadium

== Competitions ==
=== Overall record ===
Competition	First match	Last match	Record							
Competition	First match	Last match	G	W	D	L	GF	GA	GD	Win %
Iraqi Premier League	14 September 2015	21 May 2016	24	10	9	5	28	20	+8	41.67
Total			24	10	9	5	28	20	+8	41.67

=== Iraqi Premier League ===
==== Group stage ====
Pos	Team	Pld	W	D	L	GF	GA	GD	Pts	Qualification or relegation
2	Naft Al-Wasat	17	10	5	2	24	14	+10	35	Qualified to Elite Stage
3	Al-Naft	17	9	5	3	21	10	+11	32	Qualified to Elite Stage
4	Al-Talaba	17	7	6	4	20	14	+6	27	Qualified to Elite Stage
5	Naft Maysan	17	6	6	5	16	16	0	24	
6	Al-Kahrabaa	17	3	7	7	9	17	−8	16	

Source: Goalzz
Rules for classification: 1) points; 2) goal difference; 3) number of goals scored.

===== Results by round =====
Round	1	2	3	4	5	6	7	8	9	10	11	12	13	14	15	16	17	18
Ground	A	H	H	A	H	A	H	A	H	H	A	A	H	A	H	A	H	A
Result	L	W	W	D	L	D	W	W	L	D	W	D	–	D	W	D	W	L

Source: Kooora.com
A = Away; H = Home; W = Win; D = Draw; L = Loss

===== Matches =====
14 September 2015 1	Naft Al-Wasat	1–0	Al-Talaba	Najaf
15:30 UTC+03:00	Sadir 31'			Stadium: An-Najaf Stadium

19 September 2015 2	Al-Talaba	3–1	Al-Kahraba	Baghdad
15:30 UTC+03:00	Tariq 45', 50'; Abdul-Mohsen 70'		Ali 69'	Stadium: Al-Quwa Al-Jawiya Stadium

24 September 2015 3	Al-Talaba	2–0	Naft Maysan	Baghdad
15:30 UTC+03:00	Abdul-Zahra 41'; Tariq 72'; Abbas (red card) 80'			Stadium: Al-Quwa Al-Jawiya Stadium

29 September 2015 4	Duhok	1–1	Al-Talaba	Duhok
15:30 UTC+03:00	Ali 56'		Salqini 34'	Stadium: Duhok Stadium

16 October 2015 5	Al-Talaba	0–1	Al-Zawra'a	Baghdad
15:00 UTC+03:00			Abdul-Raheem 25'	Stadium: Al-Quwa Al-Jawiya Stadium

21 October 2015 6	Al-Karkh	4–4	Al-Talaba	Baghdad
15:00 UTC+03:00	Hameed 13'; Al-Jarih 26'; Kareem 61'; Mousa 83'		Mahmoud 6'; Tariq 20' (pen.), 73'; Dodah 79'	Stadium: Al Karkh Stadium

26 October 2015 7	Al-Talaba	1–0	Naft Al-Janoob	Baghdad
14:30 UTC+03:00	Tariq 69'			Stadium: Al-Quwa Al-Jawiya Stadium

5 November 2015 8	Samawa	0–1	Al-Talaba	Samawa
14:30 UTC+03:00			Mahmoud 61'	Stadium: As Samawah Stadium

7 December 2015 9	Al-Talaba	0–1	Al-Naft	Baghdad
14:00 UTC+03:00	Kadhim (red card) 90'		Qasim 28'	Stadium: Al-Quwa Al-Jawiya Stadium

12 December 2015 10	Al-Talaba	1–1	Naft Al-Wasat	Baghdad
14:00 UTC+03:00	Mahmoud 76'		Sadir 31'; Noumi (red card) 57'	Stadium: Al-Quwa Al-Jawiya Stadium

16 December 2015 11	Al-Kahraba	0–2	Al-Talaba	Baghdad
14:00 UTC+03:00			Kroma 13'; Tariq (red card) 46'; Amado 90+1' (o.g.)	Stadium: Al Kahraba Stadium

20 January 2016 12	Naft Maysan	0–0	Al-Talaba	Amarah
14:30 UTC+03:00				Stadium: Al-Maimuna Stadium

27 January 2016 13	Al-Talaba	–	Duhok	Baghdad
14:30 UTC+03:00				Stadium: Al-Quwa Al-Jawiya Stadium
Note: Duhok withdrew from the second half of the group.

2 February 2016 14	Al-Zawra'a	0–0	Al-Talaba	Baghdad
14:30 UTC+03:00				Stadium: Al Sinaa Stadium

15 February 2016 15	Al-Talaba	1–0	Al-Karkh	Baghdad
14:00 UTC+03:00	Tariq 5'; Mohammed (red card) 70'			Stadium: Al-Quwa Al-Jawiya Stadium

19 February 2016 16	Naft Al-Janoob	2–2	Al-Talaba	Basra
14:00 UTC+03:00	Malik 2', 57'		Tariq 25'; Saeed 58'	Stadium: Naft Al-Janoob Stadium

28 February 2016 17	Al-Talaba	2–0	Samawa	Baghdad
14:30 UTC+03:00	Tariq 58'; Karim 89' (pen.)			Stadium: Al-Quwa Al-Jawiya Stadium

3 March 2016 18	Al-Naft	2–0	Al-Talaba	Baghdad
14:30 UTC+03:00	Hussein 9'; Karim 24'			Stadium: Al Naft Stadium

Last updated: 3 March 2016
Source: Kooora

==== Final stage ====
===== Results by round =====
Round	1	2	3	4	5	6	7
Ground	N	N	N	A	H	N	N
Result	L	W	D	D	W	D	W

Source: Kooora.com
A = Away; H = Home; N = Neutral; W = Win; D = Draw; L = Loss

===== Matches =====
2 April 2016 1	Al-Talaba	0–1	Al-Shorta	Baghdad
15:10 UTC+03:00			Kalaf 86'	Stadium: Al-Shaab Stadium

7 April 2016 2	Al-Talaba	2–1	Al-Quwa Al-Jawiya	Baghdad
15:30 UTC+03:00	Tariq 72'; Nadhim 80'		Rasan 33'	Stadium: Al-Shaab Stadium

16 April 2016 3	Al-Talaba	1–1	Al-Zawra'a	Baghdad
16:00 UTC+03:00	Al-Ameen 24'		Jwayed 17' (pen.)	Stadium: Al-Shaab Stadium

22 April 2016 4	Naft Al-Wasat	1–1	Al-Talaba	Najaf
16:30 UTC+03:00	Yassin 55'		Al-Ameen (yellow card) 46' (yellow-red card); Abban 90+3'	Stadium: An-Najaf Stadium

8 May 2016 5	Al-Talaba	1–0	Al-Mina'a	Baghdad
16:45 UTC+03:00	Abdul-Mohsen 81'		Ibrahim (yellow card) 83' (yellow-red card)	Stadium: Al-Shaab Stadium

16 May 2016 6	Al-Talaba	1–1	Al-Naft	Baghdad
16:45 UTC+03:00	Abban 90+2'; Mahmoud (yellow card) 90+5' (yellow-red card)		Karim 36'	Stadium: Al-Shaab Stadium

21 May 2016 7	Al-Talaba	2–1	Baghdad	Baghdad
16:45 UTC+03:00	Kroma 27'; Hassan 76'		Abbas 38'	Stadium: Al-Shaab Stadium

Last updated: 21 May 2016
Source: Kooora
