= 2016–17 Al-Talaba SC season =

Al-Talaba
2016–17 season
- President Honorary President: Alaa Kadhim; Abdul-Razzaq Al-Essa
- Manager: Ayoub Odisho
- Stadium: Al-Shaab Stadium; Al-Quwa Al-Jawiya Stadium
- Iraqi Premier League: 4th
- Top goalscorer: League: Samer Saeed (3 goals); All: Samer Saeed (3 goals)
| Home colours | Away colours | Third colours |

The 2016–17 season is Al-Talaba Sport Club's 42nd consecutive season in the Iraqi Premier League, the top-flight of Iraqi football. Having finished in 3rd place in the final stage of the previous season, Al-Talaba is competing in the Iraqi Premier League and the Iraq FA Cup.

== Season summary ==
=== Pre-season ===
The first step that was taken by the administrative board was to renew Ayoub Odisho's contract for another season, announcing it on their Facebook page on 10 June 2016 with a worth of 300m IQD. With Kareem Salman being taken to the Iraq national under-23 team as an assistant manager, Al-Talaba were left to sign a new assistant, contacting Mudhaffar Jabbar and Saadi Toma, who refused the offer, and Shaker Mahmoud who approved and was signed on 15 July.

Al-Talaba announced on 13 June their first six signings. They signed eight other players including two big names, Ameer Sabah and Mustafa Karim, on 20 June, returning to their home club. The board also renewed the contracts of 12 players including last season's captain, Younis Mahmoud, second captain Mahdi Karim, and the team's playmaker, Samer Saeed. Al-Talaba released Mustafa Karim and Ameer Sabah in August, after two months of signing them due to a financial dispute with the board along with signing the three allowed foreign players who were all from Africa.

=== September ===
Al-Talaba started their 2016–17 Iraqi Premier League campaign on 15 September 2016 with a 1–1 draw against their rivals Al-Shorta, equalizing the score just before the end of the first half with a header from the team's captain, Samer Saeed, from a corner after the opponent took advantage of a miscommunication between Ali Abdul-Hassan and Ehab Kadhim and scored the first goal. In the second round, Al-Talaba managed to get a 1–0 win against the title holders Al-Zawra'a with Samer Saeed's goal from Saad Jassim's cross. Against the newly promoted club Al-Hussein, Al-Talaba claimed their second win with a goal from Karrar Ali Barri while playing with ten men due to the injury of Muthana Khalid and having no substitutes left.

=== October ===
After their match against Al-Quwa Al-Jawiya was postponed, Al-Talaba faced the newly promoted side Al-Bahri away. The match ended in a 2–2 draw with the goals of Mustafa Al-Ameen, which went in from a deflection in the second minute of the match, and Ehab Kadhim from a penalty in the second half before Al-Bahri equalized in the last minutes with a penalty as well. Al-Talaba returned to their winning ways with a comfortable 3–0 against Karbalaa at home. Two goals were scored by Yassir Abdul-Mohsen and the last one was scored from a penalty by Mahdi Karim.

=== November ===
Al-Talaba went into their sixth game of the season with no losses to face Al-Naft away. After only 12 seconds, Al-Naft scored and in the 18th minute, they extended the lead, ending the first half at 2–0. In the second half, Samer Saeed pulled one back before the team captain Mahdi Karim equalized from a penalty in extra time. On 6 November, the club announced its bankruptcy and decided to stop all of its activities and withdraw from the league. After two days, they took back their decision after the Minister of Higher Education and Scientific Research Abdul-Razzaq Al-Essa promised the club to pay for all of its dues after an interference from the Minister of Youth and Sport Abdul-Hussein Aptan to solve the situation. In the 8th round, Al-Talaba faced Erbil at home. They dominated the match but Erbil's defense denied them many goals which resulted in a 0–0 draw.

== Players ==
=== Squad information ===
The squad for the season consisted of the players listed in the tables below:

Note 1: Flags indicate national team as defined under FIFA eligibility rules. Players may hold more than one non-FIFA nationality.

Note 2: Players with squad numbers marked ‡ joined the club during the 2016–17 season via transfer, with more details in the following section.

| No. | Pos | Nat | Player | Total | | Iraqi Premier League | | Iraq FA Cup | |
| No. | Pos | Nat | Player | Apps | Goals | Apps | Goals | Apps | Goals |
|---|---|---|---|---|---|---|---|---|---|
| 2 | DF | (Iraq) IRQ | Mustafa Mohammed | 2 | 0 | 2 | 0 | 0 | 0 |
| 3 | DF | (Iraq) IRQ | Saad Jasim | 6 | 1 | 6 | 1 | 0 | 0 |
| 4^{‡} | DF | (Iraq) IRQ | Burhan Juma'a | 7 | 0 | 7 | 0 | 0 | 0 |
| 5^{‡} | DF | (Iraq) IRQ | Haider Saadoun | 2 | 0 | 2 | 0 | 0 | 0 |
| 6 | MF | (Iraq) IRQ | Mohammed Faisal | 3 | 0 | 3 | 0 | 0 | 0 |
| 7^{‡} | FW | (Iraq) IRQ | Karrar Ali Barri | 11 | 2 | 11 | 2 | 0 | 0 |
| 8 | MF | (Iraq) IRQ | Samer Saeed | 8 | 3 | 8 | 3 | 0 | 0 |
| 9 | FW | (Iraq) IRQ | Younis Mahmoud | 0 | 0 | 0 | 0 | 0 | 0 |
| 10 | MF | (Iraq) IRQ | Mustafa Al-Ameen | 11 | 2 | 11 | 2 | 0 | 0 |
| 13^{‡} | DF | (Iraq) IRQ | Mohammed Saeed Mijbal | 1 | 0 | 1 | 0 | 0 | 0 |
| 14 | DF | (Iraq) IRQ | Abbas Ayyad | 0 | 0 | 0 | 0 | 0 | 0 |
| 15^{‡} | DF | (Iraq) IRQ | Muhannad Arzayej | 10 | 0 | 10 | 0 | 0 | 0 |
| 16 | FW | (Iraq) IRQ | Yassir Abdul-Mohsen | 7 | 0 | 7 | 0 | 0 | 0 |
| 17 | MF | (Iraq) IRQ | Ehab Kadhim | 6 | 1 | 6 | 1 | 0 | 0 |
| 18 | DF | (Iraq) IRQ | Mahdi Karim | 6 | 2 | 6 | 2 | 0 | 0 |
| 19^{‡} | FW | (Iraq) IRQ | Ahmed Abdul-Abbas | 1 | 0 | 1 | 0 | 0 | 0 |
| 20 | MF | (Iraq) IRQ | Muthana Khalid | 5 | 0 | 5 | 0 | 0 | 0 |
| 22 | MF | (Iraq) IRQ | Murtadha Juwad | 0 | 0 | 0 | 0 | 0 | 0 |
| 23 | GK | (Iraq) IRQ | Haider Jamal | 1 | 0 | 1 | 0 | 0 | 0 |
| 24 | MF | (Iraq) IRQ | Mohammed Ridha | 6 | 1 | 6 | 1 | 0 | 0 |
| 25^{‡} | MF | (Iraq) IRQ | Sattar Yaseen | 11 | 0 | 11 | 0 | 0 | 0 |
| 28^{‡} | FW | (Nigeria) NGA | Kabiru Akinsola | 3 | 0 | 3 | 0 | 0 | 0 |
| 29^{‡} | MF | (Iraq) IRQ | Shihab Razzaq Farhan | 1 | 0 | 1 | 0 | 0 | 0 |
| 30^{‡} | FW | (Ivory Coast) CIV | Abou Kone | 8 | 0 | 8 | 0 | 0 | 0 |
| 31^{‡} | MF | (Iraq) IRQ | Omar Adnan | 8 | 0 | 8 | 0 | 0 | 0 |
| 33^{‡} | MF | (Iraq) IRQ | Ahmed Khalid | 0 | 0 | 0 | 0 | 0 | 0 |
| 34^{‡} | DF | (Senegal) SEN | Fallou Sarr | 5 | 0 | 5 | 0 | 0 | 0 |
| 35 | GK | (Iraq) IRQ | Ali Abdul-Hassan | 10 | 0 | 10 | 0 | 0 | 0 |
| 39 | DF | (Iraq) IRQ | Ahmed Nadhim | 8 | 0 | 8 | 0 | 0 | 0 |
| –^{‡} | GK | (Iraq) IRQ | Karrar Mahmoud | 0 | 0 | 0 | 0 | 0 | 0 |
| –^{‡} | DF | (Iraq) IRQ | Samir Salman | 0 | 0 | 0 | 0 | 0 | 0 |
| –^{‡} | MF | (Iraq) IRQ | Samir Majid | 0 | 0 | 0 | 0 | 0 | 0 |
| –^{‡} | MF | (Iraq) IRQ | Karrar Nabeel | 0 | 0 | 0 | 0 | 0 | 0 |
| –^{‡} | MF | (Iraq) IRQ | Hassan Jassim | 0 | 0 | 0 | 0 | 0 | 0 |
| –^{‡} | FW | (Iraq) IRQ | Ibrahim Bayish | 0 | 0 | 0 | 0 | 0 | 0 |

=== Players In ===
| N | Date | Pos | Player | Moving from | Type | Transfer window |
|---|---|---|---|---|---|---|
| 15 | 13 June 2016 | DF | (Iraq) Muhannad Arzayej | (Iraq) Al-Shorta | Transfer | Summer |
| 4 | 13 June 2016 | DF | (Iraq) Burhan Juma'a | (Iraq) Erbil | Transfer | Summer |
| 19 | 13 June 2016 | FW | (Iraq) Ahmed Abdul-Abbas | (Iraq) Al-Kahraba | Transfer | Summer |
| 25 | 13 June 2016 | MF | (Iraq) Sattar Yaseen | (Iraq) Zakho | Transfer | Summer |
| – | 13 June 2016 | MF | (Iraq) Samir Majid | (Iraq) Al-Karkh | Transfer | Summer |
| – | 13 June 2016 | DF | (Iraq) Ahmed Khalid | (Iraq) Al-Karkh | Transfer | Summer |
| – | 13 June 2016 | FW | (Iraq) Ibrahim Bayish | (Iraq) Al-Sinaa | Transfer | Summer |
| 7 | 14 June 2016 | MF | (Iraq) Karrar Ali Barri | (Iraq) Al-Kahraba | Transfer | Summer |
| – | 20 June 2016 | FW | (Iraq) Mustafa Karim | (Iraq) Naft Al-Wasat | Transfer | Summer |
| – | 20 June 2016 | MF | (Iraq) Ameer Sabah | (Iraq) Al-Shorta | Transfer | Summer |
| – | 20 June 2016 | MF | (Iraq) Karrar Nabeel | (Iraq) Diwaniya | Transfer | Summer |
| – | 21 June 2016 | DF | (Iraq) Samir Salman | (Iraq) Amanat Baghdad | Transfer | Summer |
| 31 | 21 June 2016 | MF | (Iraq) Omar Adnan | (Iraq) Al-Sinaa | Transfer | Summer |
| – | 29 June 2016 | GK | (Iraq) Karrar Mahmoud | (Iraq) Al-Bareed | Transfer | Summer |
| – | 3 July 2016 | MF | (Iraq) Hassan Jassim | (Iraq) Al-Jaish | Transfer | Summer |
| 5 | 5 July 2016 | DF | (Iraq) Haider Saadoun | (Iraq) Al-Kahraba | Transfer | Summer |
| 29 | 13 July 2016 | MF | (Iraq) Shihab Razzaq Farhan | (Iraq) Al-Quwa Al-Jawiya | Transfer | Summer |
| 13 | 17 August 2016 | DF | (Iraq) Mohammed Saeed Mijbal | (Iraq) Al-Karkh | Transfer | Summer |
| 28 | 31 August 2016 | FW | (Nigeria) Kabiru Akinsola | (Spain) Mérida | Transfer | Summer |
| 34 | 31 August 2016 | DF | (Senegal) Fallou Sarr | (Senegal) AJEL de Rufisque | Transfer | Summer |
| 30 | 31 August 2016 | FW | (Ivory Coast) Abou Kone | (Kuwait) Al-Shabab | Transfer | Summer |

=== Players Out ===
| Date | Pos | Player | Moving to | Type | Transfer window |
|---|---|---|---|---|---|
| 23 May 2016 | MF | (Iraq) Yousif Nabeel | Unattached | End of contract | Summer |
| 23 May 2016 | FW | (Iraq) Mustafa Ali Ni'ma | Unattached | End of contract | Summer |
| 23 May 2016 | FW | (Iraq) Karrar Ali Dodah | Unattached | End of contract | Summer |
| 23 May 2016 | DF | (Iraq) Haider Ali Abid | Unattached | End of contract | Summer |
| 23 May 2016 | DF | (Iraq) Ali Hussein Ali | Unattached | End of contract | Summer |
| 23 May 2016 | DF | (Iraq) Haider Ali Kadhim | Unattached | End of contract | Summer |
| 23 May 2016 | DF | (Iraq) Hassan Abbas | Unattached | End of contract | Summer |
| 23 May 2016 | DF | (Syria) Saad Hassan | Unattached | End of contract | Summer |
| 23 May 2016 | DF | (Syria) Moayad Al-Khouli | Unattached | End of contract | Summer |
| 23 May 2016 | MF | (Syria) Thaer Kroma | Unattached | End of contract | Summer |
| 23 May 2016 | FW | (Syria) Abdul-Lateef Salqini | Unattached | End of contract | Summer |
| 23 May 2016 | FW | (Ghana) James Abban | Unattached | End of contract | Summer |
| 17 June 2016 | FW | (Iraq) Alaa Muhsin | (Iraq) Karbalaa | Transfer | Summer |
| 19 June 2016 | MF | (Iraq) Aqeel Abbas Jabur | (Iraq) Baghdad | Transfer | Summer |
| 20 June 2016 | MF | (Iraq) Ahmed Ali Hussein | (Iraq) Al-Hedood | Transfer | Summer |
| 22 June 2016 | FW | (Iraq) Amjad Abbas | (Iraq) Al-Kahraba | Transfer | Summer |
| 4 July 2016 | DF | (Iraq) Mohammed Abdul-Zahra | (Iraq) Najaf | Transfer | Summer |
| 7 July 2016 | FW | (Iraq) Abdul-Qadir Tariq | (Iraq) Al-Shorta | Transfer | Summer |
| 25 July 2016 | GK | (Iraq) Saif Jameel | (Iraq) Al-Kahraba | Transfer | Summer |
| 4 August 2016 | FW | (Iraq) Mustafa Karim | Unattached | Released | Summer |
| 24 August 2016 | MF | (Iraq) Sajjad Jassim | Unattached | Released | Summer |
| 27 August 2016 | MF | (Iraq) Ameer Sabah | Unattached | Released | Summer |

== Technical staff ==
| Position | Staff |
|---|---|
| First team manager | Ayoub Odisho |
| Assistant manager | Shaker Mahmoud; Hassan Turki; Sadiq Saadoun |
| Goalkeeping coach | Hisham Ali |

Last updated: 15 July 2016
Source: Facebook – ALTalaba Sport Club

== Statistics ==
=== Overall statistics ===
| | League | Cup | Total Stats |
|---|---|---|---|
| Games played | 11 | 0 | 11 |
| Games won | 5 | 0 | 5 |
| Games drawn | 6 | 0 | 6 |
| Games lost | 0 | 0 | 0 |
| Goals scored | 15 | 0 | 15 |
| Goals conceded | 7 | 0 | 7 |
| Goal difference | +8 | 0 | +8 |
| Clean sheets | 5 | 0 | 5 |
| Goal by Substitute | 1 | 0 | 1 |
| Red cards | 0 | 0 | 0 |

Last updated: 16 December 2016

=== Top scorers ===
| Rank | Position | Nationality | Number | Name | Iraqi Premier League | Iraq FA Cup | Total |
|---|---|---|---|---|---|---|---|
| 1 | MF | (Iraq) | 8 | Samer Saeed | 3 | 0 | 3 |
| 2 | FW | (Iraq) | 16 | Yassir Abdul-Mohsen | 2 | 0 | 2 |
| 2 | FW | (Iraq) | 7 | Karrar Ali Barri | 2 | 0 | 2 |
| 2 | DF | (Iraq) | 18 | Mahdi Karim | 2 | 0 | 2 |
| 2 | MF | (Iraq) | 10 | Mustafa Al-Ameen | 2 | 0 | 2 |
| 3 | FW | (Ivory Coast) | 30 | Abou Kone | 1 | 0 | 1 |
| 3 | MF | (Iraq) | 17 | Ehab Kadhim | 1 | 0 | 1 |
| 3 | DF | (Iraq) | 3 | Saad Jasim | 1 | 0 | 1 |
| 3 | MF | (Iraq) | 24 | Mohammed Ridha | 1 | 0 | 1 |
| TOTALS | | | | | 15 | 0 | 15 |

Last updated: 11 December 2016

=== Clean sheets ===
| Rank | Nationality | Number | Name | Iraqi Premier League | Iraq FA Cup | Total |
|---|---|---|---|---|---|---|
| 1 | (Iraq) | 35 | Ali Abdul-Hassan | 6 | 0 | 6 |
| TOTALS | | | | 6 | 0 | 6 |

Last updated: 16 December 2016

== Friendlies ==
Win Draw Loss

| 28 July 2016 Friendly | Al-Talaba | 2–0 | Al-Hedood | University of Baghdad, Baghdad |
| 17:45 AST | | | | Stadium: Al-Burj Stadium |

| 3 August 2016 Friendly | Al-Talaba | 0–0 | Iraq U20 | University of Baghdad, Baghdad |
| 17:30 AST | | | | Stadium: Al-Burj Stadium |

| 15 August 2016 Friendly | Al-Talaba | 2–1 | Naft Maysan | University of Baghdad, Baghdad |
| 17:00 AST | Kadhim (pen.); Abdul-Abbas | | Hamid | Stadium: Al-Burj Stadium |

| 18 August 2016 Friendly | Al-Talaba | 2–2 | Al-Hedood | University of Baghdad, Baghdad |
| 17:00 AST | Barri; Sabah | | | Stadium: Al-Burj Stadium |

| 20 August 2016 Friendly | Al-Talaba | 0–0 | Al-Shorta | University of Baghdad, Baghdad |
| 17:00 AST | | | | Stadium: Al-Burj Stadium |

| 30 August 2016 Friendly | Al-Talaba | 1–1 | Karbalaa | University of Baghdad, Baghdad |
| 17:00 AST | Kadhim (pen.) | | Kareem (pen.) | Stadium: Al-Burj Stadium |

| 3 September 2016 Friendly | Al-Naft | 1–0 | Al-Talaba | Baghdad |
| 16:00 AST | Ali 89' | | | Stadium: Al Naft Stadium |

| 5 September 2016 Friendly | Amanat Baghdad | 1–0 | Al-Talaba | Baghdad |
| 16:30 AST | Hussein (pen.) | | | Stadium: Amanat Baghdad Stadium |

| 9 September 2016 Friendly | Al-Quwa Al-Jawiya | 1–1 | Al-Talaba | Baghdad |
| 16:30 AST | Radhi (pen.) | | Kadhim (pen.) | Stadium: Al-Quwa Al-Jawiya Stadium |

| 2 October 2016 Friendly | Al-Zawra'a | 1–2 | Al-Talaba | Baghdad |
| 15:30 AST | Salah | | Karim; Abdul-Abbas | Stadium: Al-Shalchiya Stadium |

== Competitions ==
=== Overview ===
| Competition | Record | | | | | | | |
| Competition | G | W | D | L | GF | GA | GD | Win % |
|---|---|---|---|---|---|---|---|---|
| Iraqi Premier League | 11 | 5 | 6 | 0 | 15 | 7 | +8 | 45.45 |
| Iraq FA Cup | 0 | 0 | 0 | 0 | 0 | 0 | +0 | — |
| Total | 11 | 5 | 6 | 0 | 15 | 7 | +8 | 45.45 |

Updated to match played 16 December 2016
Source: Competitions

=== Iraqi Premier League ===
==== League table ====
| Pos | Team | Pld | W | D | L | GF | GA | GD | Pts |
|---|---|---|---|---|---|---|---|---|---|
| 5 | Naft Al-Wasat | 36 | 19 | 11 | 6 | 45 | 26 | +19 | 68 |
| 6 | Al-Minaa | 36 | 18 | 12 | 6 | 40 | 24 | +16 | 66 |
| 7 | Al-Talaba | 36 | 14 | 12 | 10 | 51 | 38 | +13 | 54 |
| 8 | Amanat Baghdad | 36 | 12 | 15 | 9 | 26 | 21 | +5 | 51 |
| 9 | Al-Najaf | 36 | 12 | 13 | 11 | 41 | 38 | +3 | 49 |

Source: Goalzz
Rules for classification: 1) points; 2) goal difference; 3) number of goals scored.

==== Results summary ====
| Overall | | | | | | | | Home | | | | | | Away | | | | | |
| Pld | W | D | L | GF | GA | GD | Pts | W | D | L | GF | GA | GD | W | D | L | GF | GA | GD |
|---|---|---|---|---|---|---|---|---|---|---|---|---|---|---|---|---|---|---|---|
| 11 | 5 | 6 | 0 | 15 | 7 | +8 | 21 | 3 | 3 | 0 | 7 | 1 | +6 | 2 | 3 | 0 | 8 | 6 | +2 |

Last updated: 16 December 2016.
Source: Kooora

==== Results by matchday ====
| Matchday | 1 | 2 | 3 | 4 | 5 | 6 | 7 | 8 | 9 | 10 | 11 | 12 | 13 | 14 | 15 | 16 | 17 | 18 | 19 | 20 | 21 | 22 | 23 | 24 | 25 | 26 | 27 | 28 | 29 | 30 | 31 | 32 | 33 | 34 | 35 | 36 | 37 | 38 |
|---|---|---|---|---|---|---|---|---|---|---|---|---|---|---|---|---|---|---|---|---|---|---|---|---|---|---|---|---|---|---|---|---|---|---|---|---|---|---|
| Ground | H | A | H | H | A | H | A | H | A | H | A | H | A | H | A | H | A | A | H | | | | | | | | | | | | | | | | | | | |
| Result | D | W | W | P | D | W | D | D | D | W | W | D | | | | | | | | | | | | | | | | | | | | | | | | | | |
| Position | 10 | 2 | 3 | 4 | 4 | 4 | 5 | 5 | 6 | 6 | 4 | 5 | | | | | | | | | | | | | | | | | | | | | | | | | | |

Updated to match(es) played on 16 December 2016. Source: Kooora
A = Away; H = Home; W = Win; D = Draw; L = Loss; P = Postponed

==== Matches ====
| 15 September 2016 1 | Al-Talaba | 1–1 | Al-Shorta | Baghdad |
| 18:00 AST | Saeed 45+3' | | Waleed 37' | Stadium: Al-Shaab Stadium; Referee: Wathiq Mohammed |

| 20 September 2016 2 | Al-Zawra'a | 0–1 | Al-Talaba | Baghdad |
| 18:00 AST | Fadhel (yellow card) 34' (yellow-red card) 82' | | Saeed 37' | Stadium: Al-Shaab Stadium; Referee: Muhannad Qasim |

| 25 September 2016 3 | Al-Talaba | 1–0 | Al-Hussein | Baghdad |
| 15:30 AST | Barri 75' | | | Stadium: Al-Quwa Al-Jawiya Stadium |

| 15 October 2016 4 | Al-Talaba | v | Al-Quwa Al-Jawiya | Baghdad |
| AST |

| 20 October 2016 5 | Al-Bahri | 2–2 | Al-Talaba | Basra |
| 15:00 AST | Hadi 28'; Hussein 70' (pen.) | | Al-Ameen 2'; Kadhim 52' (pen.) | Stadium: Al-Zubair Stadium; Referee: Sabah Abid |

| 27 October 2016 6 | Al-Talaba | 3–0 | Karbalaa | Baghdad |
| 14:30 AST | Abdul-Mohsen 33', 56'; Karim 66' (pen.) | | | Stadium: Al Quwa Al Jawiya Stadium; Referee: Zaid Thamir |

| 3 November 2016 7 | Al-Naft | 2–2 | Al-Talaba | Baghdad |
| 14:30 AST | Fayad 1'; Jawda 18' | | Saeed 56'; Karim 90+5' (pen.) | Stadium: Al Naft Stadium; Referee: Haitham Mohammed |

| 25 November 2016 8 | Al-Talaba | 0–0 | Erbil | Baghdad |
| 16:00 AST | | | | Stadium: Al-Shaab Stadium; Referee: Wathiq Mohammed |

| 30 November 2016 9 | Al-Samawa | 1–1 | Al-Talaba | Samawa |
| 14:00 AST | Sillal 45' | | Jasim 56' | Stadium: Al-Samawah Stadium |

| 6 December 2016 10 | Al-Talaba | 2–0 | Naft Al-Janoob | Baghdad |
| 14:00 AST | Barri 32'; Ridha 84' | | | Stadium: Al Quwa Al Jawiya Stadium; Referee: Zaid Thamir |

| 11 December 2016 11 | Naft Maysan | 1–2 | Al-Talaba | Amarah |
| 14:00 AST | Mhaisin 50' | | Al-Ameen 39'; Kone 59' (pen.) | Stadium: Al-Maimouna Stadium |

| 16 December 2016 12 | Al-Talaba | 0–0 | Amanat Baghdad | Baghdad |
| 14:00 AST | | | | Stadium: Al-Quwa Al-Jawiya Stadium |

| 20 December 2016 13 | Al-Karkh | v | Al-Talaba | Baghdad |
| AST |

| 26 December 2016 14 | Al-Talaba | v | Naft Al-Wasat | Baghdad |
| AST |

| 30 December 2016 15 | Al-Hedood | v | Al-Talaba | Baghdad |
| AST |

| 5 January 2017 16 | Al-Talaba | v | Al-Najaf | Baghdad |
| AST |

| 10 January 2017 17 | Zakho | v | Al-Talaba | Zakho |
| AST |

| 16 January 2017 18 | Al-Mina'a | v | Al-Talaba | Basra |
| AST |

| 21 January 2017 19 | Al-Talaba | v | Al-Kahraba | Baghdad |
| AST |
