= 2011–12 Al-Quwa Al-Jawiya season =

Al-Quwa Al-Jawiya
2011–12 season
- Chairman: Hussain Khalkhali
- Manager: Vacant
- Ground: Al-Quwa Al-Jawiya Stadium
- Iraqi Premier League: 3rd
- Top goalscorer: League: Hammadi Ahmed (13); All: Hammadi Ahmed (13)
Home colours	Away colours

In the 2011-12 season, Al-Quwa Al-Jawiya will be competing in the 2011-12 Iraqi Premier League.

== Current squad ==
Note: Flags indicate national team as defined under FIFA eligibility rules; some limited exceptions apply. Players may hold more than one non-FIFA nationality.

No.	Pos.	Nation	Player
1	GK	(Iraq) IRQ	Wissam Gassid
2	DF	(Iraq) IRQ	Jassim Mohammed Ghulam
3	DF	(Iraq) IRQ	Ali Abdul Jabbar
4	DF	(Iraq) IRQ	Mohammed Abdul-Zahra
5	DF	(Iraq) IRQ	Mukhallad Ali
7	MF	(Iraq) IRQ	Haitham Kadhim
8	FW	(Iraq) IRQ	Hammadi Ahmed
9	FW	(Iraq) IRQ	Razzaq Farhan
11	MF	(Iraq) IRQ	Humam Tariq
11	MF	(Iraq) IRQ	Khalid Saad
13	MF	(Iraq) IRQ	Bashar Resen
15	FW	(Iraq) IRQ	Ahmad Khudhair
16	MF	(Iraq) IRQ	Ali Sabah

No.	Pos.	Nation	Player
17	MF	(Iraq) IRQ	Ahmed Abdul-Ameer
18	FW	(Iraq) IRQ	Yassir Abdul-Mohsen
23	DF	(Iraq) IRQ	Salah Hilal
26	MF	(Iraq) IRQ	Haidar Hussein Askar
28	MF	(Iraq) IRQ	Ibrahim Kamil
40	GK	(Iraq) IRQ	Ali Taleb
—	DF	(Iraq) IRQ	Anwar Ali
—	DF	(Iraq) IRQ	Ayad Sadir
—	MF	(Iraq) IRQ	Ali Mahmood
—	MF	(Iraq) IRQ	Muthana Khalid
—	MF	(Iraq) IRQ	Hussam Kadhim
—	FW	(Iraq) IRQ	Mohammad Hannon Mashkoor
—	FW	(Iraq) IRQ	Mustafa Jawad

== Transfers ==
=== In ===
Date	Pos.	Name	From	Fee
September 2011	DF	(Iraq) Ayad Sadir	(Iraq) Najaf FC	-
October 2011	MF	(Iraq) Ali Mahmood	(Iraq) Al-Diwaniya FC	-
December 2011	MF	(Iraq) Muthana Khalid	(Iraq) Arbil FC	-
February 2012	FW	(Iraq) Mustafa Jawad	(Iraq) Al Karkh	-
February 2012	MF	(Iraq) Hussam Kadhim	(Iraq) Arbil	-

=== Out ===
Date	Pos.	Name	To	Fee
August 2011	MF	(Iraq) Muthana Khalid	(Iraq) Al Shorta	-
August 2011	MF	(Iraq) Ahmad Ayad	(Iraq) Arbil FC	-
August 2011	DF	(Iraq) Hussein Ali Waheed	(Iraq) Arbil FC	-
August 2011	FW	(Iraq) Amjad Radhi	(Iraq) Arbil FC	-
September 2011	GK	(Iraq) Saqar Ajeel Al-Janabi	(Iraq) Baghdad FC	-
September 2011	FW	(Iraq) Akram Hashem	(Iraq) Al Talaba	-
September 2011	DF	(Iraq) Haidar Raheem	(Iraq) Al Zawraa	-

== Matches ==
=== Competitive ===
==== Iraqi Premier League ====
4 November 2011 1	Al-Quwa Al-Jawiya	4 – 0	Kirkuk	Baghdad
12:00 GMT	Ali Abdul Jabbar 23'; Hammadi Ahmed 52'; Razzaq Farhan 73'; Ahmad Khudhair 90'			Stadium: Al-Quwa Al-Jawiya Stadium

9 November 2011 2	Dohuk	0 – 0	Al-Quwa Al-Jawiya	Dohuk
12:00 GMT				Stadium: Dohuk Stadium

17 November 2011 3	Al-Quwa Al-Jawiya	0 – 2	Al Talaba	Baghdad
13:30 GMT			Jasem Muhammed 56'; Akram Hashem 58'	Stadium: Al-Shaab Stadium

23 November 2011 4	Al-Quwa Al-Jawiya	3 – 0	Zakho FC	Baghdad
11:30 GMT	Ayad Sadir 10'; Hammadi Ahmed 75', 78'			Stadium: Al-Quwa Al-Jawiya Stadium

29 November 2011 5	Najaf	0 – 0	Al-Quwa Al-Jawiya	Najaf
11:30 GMT				Stadium: An Najaf Stadium

4 December 2011 6	Al-Quwa Al-Jawiya	1 – 0	Al-Sinaa	Baghdad
11:30 GMT	Yaser Abdul Mohsen 71'			Stadium: Al-Quwa Al-Jawiya Stadium

9 January 2012 7	Al-Naft	1 – 2	Al-Quwa Al-Jawiya	Baghdad
14:00 GMT	Munir Hammoud 55'		Yaser Abdul Mohsen 13', 32'	Stadium: Al Shaab Stadium

19 December 2011 8	Al-Quwa Al-Jawiya	3 – 0	Al-Masafi	Baghdad
11:30 GMT	Hammadi Ahmed 51'; Haitham Kadhim 55', 60'			Stadium: Al-Quwa Al-Jawiya Stadium

26 December 2011 9	Al Shorta	0 – 0	Al-Quwa Al-Jawiya	Baghdad
14:00 GMT				Stadium: Al Shaab Stadium

31 December 2011 10	Al-Quwa Al-Jawiya	1 – 0	Baghdad	Baghdad
11:30 GMT	Yassir Abdul-Mohsen 38'			Stadium: Al-Quwa Al-Jawiya

5 January 2012 11	Al-Shirqat	0 – 2	Al-Quwa Al-Jawiya	Kirkuk
11:30 GMT			Ali Jamal 67'; Hamadi Ahmed 75'	Stadium: Al-Shirqat Stadium

18 January 2012 12	Al-Kahraba	0 – 1	Al-Quwa Al-Jawiya	Baghdad
11:30 GMT			Hamadi Ahmed 9'	Stadium: Al Naft Stadium

27 January 2012 13	Al-Quwa Al-Jawiya	0 – 0	Arbil	Baghdad
11:30 GMT				Stadium: Al-Quwa Al-Jawiya Stadium

2 February 2012 14	Al Karkh	0 – 4	Al-Quwa Al-Jawiya	Baghdad
11:30 GMT			Hamadi Ahmed 20', 38', 87', 90'	Stadium: Al Karkh Stadium

10 February 2012 15	Al Zawraa	1 – 1	Al-Quwa Al-Jawiya	Baghdad
12:30 GMT	Hesham Mohammed 69'		Hamadi Ahmed 80'	Stadium: Al Shaab Stadium

12 March 2012 16	Al-Quwa Al-Jawiya	–	Karbala	Baghdad
11:30 GMT				Stadium: Al-Quwa Al-Jawiya Stadium

24 February 2012 17	Al-Quwa Al-Jawiya	2 – 1	Al Minaa	Baghdad
11:30 GMT	Hamadi Ahmed 30'; Ahmed Abdul-Ameer 36'		Naif Falah 53'	Stadium: Al-Quwa Al-Jawiya Stadium
