= 2016–17 Iraqi Premier League =

Iraqi Premier League
- Season: 2016–17
- Dates: 15 September 2016 – 10 August 2017
- Champions: Al-Quwa Al-Jawiya (6th title)
- Relegated: Al-Karkh; Erbil
- AFC Cup: Al-Quwa Al-Jawiya; Al-Zawraa
- Arab Club Champions Cup: Al-Quwa Al-Jawiya; Al-Naft
- Matches: 342
- Goals: 725 (2.12 per match)
- Top goalscorer: Alaa Abdul-Zahra (23 goals)
- Biggest home win: Al-Zawraa 6–0 Karbala (16 October 2016); Al-Naft 6–0 Zakho (17 May 2017)
- Highest scoring: Al-Bahri 3–7 Al-Shorta (5 March 2017); Al-Zawraa 6–4 Al-Hussein (16 May 2017)
- Longest winning run: 6 games Al-Naft; Al-Quwa Al-Jawiya
- Longest unbeaten run: 33 games Al-Quwa Al-Jawiya
- Longest winless run: 27 games Al-Samawa
- Longest losing run: 6 games Al-Bahri; Al-Hussein

The 2016–17 Iraqi Premier League (Arabic: الدوري العراقي الممتاز 2016–17) was the 43rd season of the Iraqi Premier League, the highest division for Iraqi association football clubs, since its establishment in 1974. The season started on 15 September 2016, and ended on 10 August 2017.

Al-Quwa Al-Jawiya won their sixth Premier League title, finishing four points ahead of second-placed Al-Naft and losing just one game throughout the campaign. It was the club's first league title since the 2004–05 season, and their manager Basim Qasim became the first manager to win titles in two consecutive seasons with two different teams.

== Teams ==
Locations of the 2016–17 Iraqi Premier League teams

Twenty teams were to compete in the league – the top eighteen teams from the previous season, as well as two teams promoted from the First Division League. However, Erbil withdrew from the league after 12 rounds, so nineteen teams completed the season.

Al-Hussein were promoted as the leaders of the final stage after drawing 1–1 against Brayati on 19 July 2016, at Al-Shaab Stadium, to appear for the first time in their history in the Iraqi Premier League. Al-Bahri were promoted, to appear for the seventh time in the Iraqi Premier League (the first since 1990–91), as the runners-up after drawing with Al-Sinaat Al-Kahrabaiya 2–2 on the same day at Al-Karkh Stadium. They replace Duhok, who withdrew from the last season, and Al-Sinaa.

=== Stadia and locations ===
Club	Location	Stadium	Capacity
Al-Bahri	Basra	Al-Zubair Stadium	5,000
Al-Hudood	Baghdad	Al-Quwa Al-Jawiya Stadium	6,000
Al-Hussein	Baghdad	Five Thousand Stadium	5,000
Al-Kahrabaa	Baghdad	Al-Kahrabaa Stadium	2,000
Al-Karkh	Baghdad	Al-Karkh Stadium	5,150
Al-Minaa	Basra	Basra International Stadium	65,227
Al-Naft	Baghdad	Al-Naft Stadium	3,000
Al-Najaf	Najaf	Al-Najaf Stadium	12,000
Al-Quwa Al-Jawiya	Baghdad	Al-Quwa Al-Jawiya Stadium	6,000
Al-Samawa	Samawa	Al-Samawa Stadium	10,000
Al-Shorta	Baghdad	Al-Shaab Stadium	34,200
Al-Talaba	Baghdad	Al-Shaab Stadium	34,200
Al-Zawraa	Baghdad	Al-Shaab Stadium	34,200
Amanat Baghdad	Baghdad	Amanat Baghdad Stadium	5,000
Erbil	Erbil	Franso Hariri Stadium	25,000
Karbala	Karbala	Karbala International Stadium	30,000
Naft Al-Junoob	Basra	Al-Zubair Stadium	5,000
Naft Al-Wasat	Najaf	Naft Al-Wasat Stadium	5,000
Naft Maysan	Amara	Al-Maimouna Stadium	3,000
Zakho	Zakho	Zakho International Stadium	20,000

== League table ==
Pos	Team	Pld	W	D	L	GF	GA	GD	Pts	Qualification or relegation
1	Al-Quwa Al-Jawiya (C)	36	23	12	1	59	23	+36	81	Qualification for the AFC Cup group stage and Arab Club Champions Cup first round
2	Al-Naft	36	22	11	3	61	17	+44	77	Qualification for the Arab Club Champions Cup first round
3	Al-Shorta	36	21	12	3	55	26	+29	75	
4	Al-Zawraa	36	21	9	6	67	28	+39	72	Qualification for the AFC Cup group stage (Note: Al-Zawraa qualified for the AFC Cup as Iraq FA Cup winners.)
5	Naft Al-Wasat	36	19	11	6	45	26	+19	68	
6	Al-Minaa	36	18	12	6	40	24	+16	66	
7	Al-Talaba	36	14	12	10	51	38	+13	54	
8	Amanat Baghdad	36	12	15	9	26	21	+5	51	
9	Al-Najaf	36	12	13	11	41	38	+3	49	
10	Naft Al-Junoob	36	8	15	13	36	42	−6	39	
11	Naft Maysan	36	8	15	13	28	36	−8	39	
12	Al-Hudood	36	8	14	14	35	46	−11	38	
13	Al-Kahrabaa	36	8	14	14	24	36	−12	38	
14	Al-Bahri	36	9	8	19	42	63	−21	35	
15	Karbala	36	6	15	15	24	46	−22	33	
16	Zakho	36	2	18	16	18	51	−33	24	
17	Al-Hussein	36	3	14	19	23	52	−29	23	
18	Al-Samawa	36	3	13	20	26	47	−21	22	
19	Al-Karkh (R)	36	3	11	22	24	65	−41	20	Relegation to the Iraqi First Division League
20	Erbil (Note: Erbil withdrew from the league after 12 matches, with their results being annulled.) (R)	0	0	0	0	0	0	0	0	Relegation to the Iraqi First Division League

Source: Goalzz
Rules for classification: 1) points; 2) goal difference; 3) number of goals scored.
(C) Champions; (R) Relegated

== Results ==
Home \ Away	BAH	HUD	HUS	KAH	KAR	MIN	NFT	NJF	QWJ	SMA	SHR	TLB	ZWR	AMN	ERB	KRB	NFJ	NFW	NFM	ZAK
Al-Bahri		2–3	4–2	0–1	2–1	2–1	0–3	1–2	0–2	2–1	3–7	2–2	2–3	2–1		1–1	1–1	2–0	1–0	1–2
Al-Hudood	2–0		0–0	1–2	2–0	1–1	1–1	2–1	1–2	0–0	2–3	0–1	0–2	0–3		1–0	1–1	0–1	1–1	1–0
Al-Hussein	2–2	0–1		0–0	1–1	0–1	0–2	0–0	1–2	1–0	1–1	2–2	0–1	1–1		0–3	2–1	0–2	0–0	2–0
Al-Kahrabaa	0–0	0–0	0–0		5–3	0–0	0–2	1–2	0–1	1–0	0–0	1–1	0–2	0–0		2–2	1–1	0–2	2–0	0–0
Al-Karkh	1–2	1–0	1–1	0–1		0–1	1–2	0–1	2–2	1–1	1–2	0–3	0–3	0–1	– (Note: Erbil's results against Al-Karkh (2–2 draw), Al-Hudood (2–2 draw), Zakho (1–0 win), Al-Kahrabaa (0–0 draw), Al-Zawraa (1–1 draw), Al-Quwa Al-Jawiya (3–1 loss), Karbala (0–0 draw), Al-Talaba (0–0 draw), Naft Al-Junoob (1–0 loss), Amanat Baghdad (2–1 win), Naft Al-Wasat (1–1 draw) and Al-Najaf (1–0 loss) were annulled after their withdrawal from the league.)	0–1	2–1	1–1	1–1	1–1
Al-Minaa	2–2	1–0	3–1	2–1	4–0		1–0	2–1	1–1	2–0	1–0	1–0	1–1	1–1		1–0	0–1	1–0	1–0	3–1
Al-Naft	2–0	4–0	3–0	1–0	1–0	0–0		1–0	0–1	3–0	0–0	2–2	0–0	1–0		3–0	3–0	1–1	2–0	6–0
Al-Najaf	1–0	2–2	1–0	2–2	0–0	2–3	2–2		1–0	2–2	1–1	2–3	0–1	0–0	–	4–1	0–0	1–2	0–0	0–0
Al-Quwa Al-Jawiya	2–0	5–2	3–1	1–0	0–0	2–1	2–1	2–0		3–2	0–0	2–1	1–1	2–0	–	3–1	3–0	1–0	2–1	1–0
Al-Samawa	0–0	0–0	1–1	0–1	4–1	0–0	1–3	1–2	1–1		0–0	1–1	0–2	0–1		2–2	3–1	0–1	0–1	0–0
Al-Shorta	2–1	3–2	1–0	1–0	4–0	1–0	0–0	3–2	1–3	4–1		1–0	0–0	1–0		2–0	2–1	2–1	2–0	4–0
Al-Talaba	2–0	1–1	1–0	2–0	4–1	0–1	2–2	0–1	0–0	1–0	1–1		1–2	0–0	–	3–0	2–0	1–2	1–2	4–1
Al-Zawraa	3–0	1–0	6–4	4–0	4–1	4–1	0–2	2–1	1–1	2–1	2–2	0–1		1–2	–	6–0	4–1	0–2	3–0	4–1
Amanat Baghdad	2–2	1–1	1–0	2–1	2–0	0–1	0–1	0–1	1–1	1–0	0–1	0–0	1–0			1–0	0–0	0–0	2–1	1–0
Erbil		–		–										–		–		–		
Karbala	1–0	1–1	0–0	0–0	0–1	1–0	1–1	0–0	0–2	1–0	2–0	1–1	0–0	0–0			1–2	1–1	0–0	1–1
Naft Al-Junoob	0–1	1–1	3–0	0–1	1–1	0–0	0–1	1–1	1–1	3–1	0–0	3–0	1–1	1–0	–	3–1		0–1	2–2	1–1
Naft Al-Wasat	2–1	2–1	3–0	2–1	4–1	0–0	2–2	1–3	1–1	1–0	0–1	2–1	1–0	0–0		2–1	2–1		2–0	0–0
Naft Maysan	4–2	1–1	1–0	2–0	2–0	1–1	0–1	1–0	0–0	1–3	0–0	1–2	0–1	1–1		2–0	1–1	0–0		1–1
Zakho	2–1	1–3	0–0	0–0	0–0	0–0	0–2	1–2	0–3 (Note: The Zakho–Al-Quwa Al-Jawiya match was awarded as a 3–0 win to Al-Quwa Al-Jawiya after Zakho's players left the field on 80 minutes while losing 1–0 in protest at a refereeing decision.)	0–0	1–2	3–4	0–0	0–0	–	0–0	0–2	1–1	0–0	

Source: Soccerway
Legend: Blue = home team win; Yellow = draw; Red = away team win.

== Season statistics ==
=== Top scorers ===
Rank	Player	Club	Goals
1	(Iraq) Alaa Abdul-Zahra	Al-Zawraa	23
2	(Iraq) Bassim Ali	Naft Al-Junoob	18
3	(Iraq) Hammadi Ahmed	Al-Quwa Al-Jawiya	17
4	(Iraq) Marwan Hussein	Al-Shorta	15
5	(Iraq) Aymen Hussein	Al-Naft	14
5	(Ivory Coast) Aboubakar Koné	Al-Talaba	14
5	(Iraq) Ali Saad	Al-Karkh / Al-Naft	14

=== Hat-tricks ===
Player	For	Against	Result	Date
(Iraq) Marwan Hussein	Al-Shorta	Al-Hudood	3–2	26 November 2016
(Ivory Coast) Aboubakar Koné	Al-Talaba	Al-Karkh	3–0	20 December 2016
(Iraq) Mohanad Ali^{4}	Al-Kahrabaa	Al-Karkh	5–3	4 January 2017
(Iraq) Abbas Abid	Zakho	Al-Talaba	3–4	11 January 2017
(Iraq) Yassir Abdul-Mohsen	Al-Talaba	Zakho	4–3	11 January 2017
(Iraq) Bassim Ali	Naft Al-Junoob	Al-Samawa	3–1	21 January 2017
(Iraq) Alaa Abdul-Zahra	Al-Zawraa	Al-Hussein	6–4	16 May 2017
(Iraq) Ali Saad^{4}	Al-Naft	Zakho	6–0	17 May 2017

Notes

^{4} Player scored 4 goals

== Awards ==
Award	Winner	Club
Soccer Iraq Goal of the Season	(Iraq) Ali Raheem	Al-Zawraa

== See also ==
- 2016–17 Iraq FA Cup
