= 2017–18 Iraqi Premier League =

Iraqi Premier League
- Season: 2017–18
- Dates: 20 November 2017 – 18 July 2018
- Champions: Al-Zawraa (14th title)
- Relegated: Karbala; Zakho
- AFC Champions League: Al-Zawraa; Al-Quwa Al-Jawiya
- Matches: 380
- Goals: 859 (2.26 per match)
- Top goalscorer: Wissam Saadoun (24 goals)
- Biggest home win: Naft Al-Wasat 5–0 Karbala (25 November 2017); Al-Quwa Al-Jawiya 5–0 Al-Hussein (9 July 2018)
- Highest scoring: Karbala 3–4 Al-Bahri (28 June 2018)
- Longest winning run: 9 games Al-Zawraa
- Longest unbeaten run: 26 games Al-Quwa Al-Jawiya
- Longest winless run: 16 games Zakho
- Longest losing run: 9 games Karbala; Al-Hussein

The 2017–18 Iraqi Premier League (Arabic: الدوري العراقي الممتاز 2017–18) was the 44th season of the Iraqi Premier League, the highest division for Iraqi association football clubs, since its establishment in 1974. The season started on 20 November 2017, and ended on 18 July 2018. Al-Zawraa won a record 14th title, finishing four points ahead of both the previous season's champions and runners-up (Al-Quwa Al-Jawiya and Al-Naft respectively) and five points ahead of Al-Shorta.

== Teams ==
Team	Location	Stadium	Capacity
Al-Bahri	Basra	Al-Zubair Stadium	5,000
Al-Diwaniya	Diwaniya	Afak Stadium	5,000
Al-Hudood	Baghdad	Al-Taji Stadium	5,000
Al-Hussein	Baghdad	Al-Taji Stadium	5,000
Al-Kahrabaa	Baghdad	Al-Taji Stadium	5,000
Al-Minaa	Basra	Basra International Stadium	65,227
Al-Naft	Baghdad	Al-Sinaa Stadium	10,000
Al-Najaf	Najaf	Al-Najaf Stadium	10,000
Al-Quwa Al-Jawiya	Baghdad	Al-Shaab Stadium	34,200
Al-Samawa	Samawa	Al-Samawa Stadium	5,000
Al-Shorta	Baghdad	Al-Shaab Stadium	34,200
Al-Sinaat Al-Kahrabaiya	Baghdad	Al-Sinaa Stadium	10,000
Al-Talaba	Baghdad	Al-Shaab Stadium	34,200
Al-Zawraa	Baghdad	Al-Shaab Stadium	34,200
Amanat Baghdad	Baghdad	Amanat Baghdad Stadium	5,000
Karbala	Karbala	Karbala International Stadium	30,000
Naft Al-Junoob	Basra	Al-Zubair Stadium	5,000
Naft Al-Wasat	Najaf	Al-Najaf Stadium	10,000
Naft Maysan	Amara	Maysan Olympic Stadium	15,000
Zakho	Zakho	Zakho International Stadium	20,000

== League table ==
Pos	Team	Pld	W	D	L	GF	GA	GD	Pts	Qualification or relegation
1	Al-Zawraa (C)	38	26	10	2	66	26	+40	88	Qualification for the AFC Champions League group stage
2	Al-Quwa Al-Jawiya	38	25	9	4	66	23	+43	84	Qualification for the AFC Champions League preliminary round 2
3	Al-Naft	38	24	12	2	59	20	+39	84	
4	Al-Shorta	38	24	11	3	69	24	+45	83	
5	Al-Kahrabaa	38	15	13	10	39	30	+9	58	
6	Al-Najaf	38	13	16	9	51	40	+11	55	
7	Amanat Baghdad	38	14	11	13	31	34	−3	53	
8	Naft Maysan	38	13	10	15	45	37	+8	49	
9	Naft Al-Wasat	38	10	19	9	42	38	+4	49	
10	Naft Al-Junoob	38	12	13	13	34	41	−7	49	
11	Al-Sinaat Al-Kahrabaiya	38	12	11	15	46	46	0	47	
12	Al-Samawa	38	11	11	16	42	50	−8	44	
13	Al-Hudood	38	11	10	17	40	45	−5	43	
14	Al-Talaba	38	11	10	17	43	59	−16	43	
15	Al-Minaa	38	8	17	13	34	47	−13	41	
16	Al-Bahri	38	8	14	16	41	55	−14	38	
17	Al-Diwaniya	38	7	10	21	32	58	−26	31	
18	Al-Hussein	38	5	12	21	26	58	−32	27	
19	Karbala (R)	38	7	6	25	26	76	−50	27	Relegation to the Iraqi First Division League
20	Zakho (R)	38	5	13	20	27	52	−25	25 (Note: Zakho were deducted three points as punishment for failing to pay the salary of their Libyan player Salem Elmslaty on time.)	Relegation to the Iraqi First Division League

Source: Goalzz
Rules for classification: 1) points; 2) goal difference; 3) number of goals scored.
(C) Champions; (R) Relegated

== Results ==
Home \ Away	BAH	DIW	HUD	HUS	KAH	MIN	NFT	NJF	QWJ	SMA	SHR	SNK	TLB	ZWR	AMN	KRB	NFJ	NFW	NFM	ZAK
Al-Bahri		2–2	1–0	1–0	2–1	1–1	1–2	1–1	1–1	1–1	1–1	2–3	2–0	1–4	0–2	1–2	0–0	1–0	1–2	3–0
Al-Diwaniya	2–1		1–1	2–0	1–1	3–1	0–4	0–0	0–1	2–1	1–2	1–2	3–1	1–3	0–0	3–0	2–1	0–1	0–0	1–1
Al-Hudood	0–2	3–1		2–2	0–0	0–0	0–0	1–0	1–2	3–0	0–1	1–2	1–1	1–2	2–0	2–1	2–0	2–2	1–0	1–0
Al-Hussein	0–0	3–0	2–1		0–1	3–0 (Note: The Al-Hussein–Al-Minaa match was awarded as a 3–0 win to Al-Hussein after Al-Minaa, who started the game with 7 players, had their player Sajad Kamel go off injured a few minutes into the game.)	0–1	3–3	0–2	0–0	0–0	0–4	0–1	1–2	2–4	0–1	2–2	0–0	1–1	2–1
Al-Kahrabaa	1–1	1–0	1–2	0–0		2–2	2–1	1–1	0–0	3–2	0–1	2–1	2–3	1–1	1–1	1–0	1–0	3–1	1–0	1–0
Al-Minaa	1–0	4–2	1–1	0–0	0–0		0–3 (Note: The Al-Minaa–Al-Naft match was awarded as a 3–0 win to Al-Naft after Al-Minaa, who started the game with 8 players, had two of their players go off injured in the first ten minutes.)	0–0	0–0	1–0	0–0	1–2	1–1	1–2	1–2	4–1	0–1	0–0	2–1	1–1
Al-Naft	2–1	3–0	2–1	1–0	1–0	0–0		2–1	0–0	2–0	2–2	4–1	1–0	2–0	2–1	3–1	0–0	2–1	2–1	2–1
Al-Najaf	2–0	0–0	1–1	0–0	2–0	3–0	0–0		3–2	1–1	0–2	1–1	3–1	1–2	0–0	3–0	1–2	3–3	1–0	1–0
Al-Quwa Al-Jawiya	2–0	2–0	1–0	5–0	1–0	1–1	0–0	4–2		2–0	1–0	2–1	1–0	1–2	1–0	4–1	3–0	2–2	1–1	5–1
Al-Samawa	2–0	3–1	1–0	3–1	1–2	2–1	0–3 (Note: The Al-Samawa–Al-Naft match originally ended 1–1 but was changed to a 3–0 win for Al-Naft due to Al-Samawa fielding the ineligible player Mohammed Hassan.)	0–0	2–2		2–2	1–1	1–0	0–0	0–0	1–0	3–0 (Note: The Al-Samawa–Naft Al-Junoob match was awarded as a 3–0 win to Al-Samawa, as Naft Al-Junoob did not turn up for the game.)	1–0	1–2	2–1
Al-Shorta	4–1	2–0	2–0	3–0	1–2	3–0 (Note: The Al-Shorta–Al-Minaa match was awarded as a 3–0 win to Al-Shorta, as Al-Minaa did not turn up for the game.)	0–0	4–0	1–0	4–1		3–1	1–0	0–0	3–0	4–0	2–1	1–0	2–0	1–0
Al-Sinaat Al-Kahrabaiya	0–0	0–0	5–1	2–1	0–2	1–2	1–0	1–2	0–1	2–2	2–2		4–2	1–4	0–1	0–0	1–0	0–0	2–1	0–0
Al-Talaba	2–2	2–1	2–1	2–0	0–4	3–1	0–1	1–1	0–4	2–1	1–3	2–1		1–1	1–1	0–1	2–2	1–1	1–0	3–1
Al-Zawraa	0–0	3–0	2–0	4–0	1–0	1–0	1–1	2–1	1–2	2–1	1–1	1–0	2–0		1–0	1–0	2–1	1–1	1–1	3–1
Amanat Baghdad	1–1	1–0	1–0	2–0	0–1	1–3	2–2	0–3	0–1	1–1	0–3	1–0	1–0	0–1		0–1	1–0	0–1	0–0	2–1
Karbala	3–4	1–1	1–4	0–2	0–0	0–1	1–1	1–5	1–4	1–2	0–1	0–4	0–3 (Note: The Karbala–Al-Talaba match was awarded as a 3–0 win to Al-Talaba, as Karbala were prevented from turning up for the game due to having not paid rent on the Karbala International Stadium where they were to host the match.)	1–3	0–1		1–1	2–2	1–0	1–0
Naft Al-Junoob	1–1	2–0	0–1	1–0	1–0	1–1	1–1	1–3	1–0	2–1	2–1	1–0	4–2	1–4	0–0	0–1		0–0	0–0	1–0
Naft Al-Wasat	3–1	2–0	2–1	1–0	1–1	1–1	0–3	0–1	0–2	2–1	3–3	0–0	0–0	0–0	0–1	5–0	1–1		1–0	2–0
Naft Maysan	3–1	1–0	3–2	5–1	1–0	3–0	0–1	3–1 (Note: The Naft Maysan–Al-Najaf match was ended at half-time with the score at 3–1 after Al-Najaf refused to take to the field for the second half in protest at refereeing decisions.)	1–2	1–0	1–1	2–0	3–0	1–2	0–0	3–1	1–2	2–2		1–1
Zakho	3–2	2–1	0–0	0–0	0–0	1–1	0–2	0–0	0–1	2–1	1–2	0–0	2–2	1–3	1–3	2–0	0–0	1–1	1–0	

Source: Goalzz
Legend: Blue = home team win; Yellow = draw; Red = away team win.

== Season statistics ==
=== Top scorers ===
Rank	Player	Club	Goals
1	(Iraq) Wissam Saadoun	Naft Maysan	24
2	(Iraq) Amjad Radhi	Al-Quwa Al-Jawiya	23
3	(Iraq) Alaa Abdul-Zahra	Al-Shorta	22
4	(Iraq) Alaa Abbas	Naft Al-Wasat	21
5	(Iraq) Mohammed Dawood	Al-Naft	18
5	(Iraq) Manar Taha	Al-Sinaat Al-Kahrabaiya	18

=== Hat-tricks ===
Player	For	Against	Result	Date
(Ivory Coast) Aboubakar Koné	Al-Kahrabaa	Al-Talaba	4–0	10 December 2017
(Ivory Coast) Aboubakar Koné	Al-Kahrabaa	Al-Samawa	3–2	15 December 2017
(Iraq) Mohammed Dawood	Al-Naft	Al-Diwaniya	4–0	28 January 2018
(Iraq) Wissam Saadoun	Naft Maysan	Al-Talaba	3–0	31 March 2018
(Iraq) Manar Taha	Al-Sinaat Al-Kahrabaiya	Al-Talaba	4–2	14 April 2018
(Iraq) Mustafa Karim	Al-Minaa	Al-Diwaniya	4–2	29 April 2018
(Iraq) Wissam Saadoun	Naft Maysan	Al-Hussein	5–1	23 June 2018

== Awards ==
Award	Winner	Club
Soccer Iraq Goal of the Season	(Iraq) Ali Raheem	Al-Zawraa

== See also ==
- 2017 Iraqi Super Cup
