= 2013–14 Iraqi First Division League =

Iraqi First Division League
- Season: 2013–14
- Promoted: Naft Al-Wasat; Al-Kahraba
- Matches played: 168
- Goals scored: 951 (5.66 per match)
- Biggest home win: Al-Oloom wal-Technologia 4-1 Al-Bahri
- Biggest away win: Al-Jaish 2-4 Al-Kahraba
- Highest scoring: Al-Jaish 2-4 Al-Kahraba
- All statistics correct as of 11 October 2015.

The 2013–14 Iraqi First Division League The season began on December 8, 2013.

== Format and teams ==

League consists of 55 clubs in 7 groups, where will qualify first and second of each group to the stage for a second to become the number of teams 14 team is added to them two teams in addition to the teams that landed last season, namely, and bringing the total number of 20 teams are divided into 4 sets each with five teams the first to qualify and the second of the two groups 1, 2, 3 clubs of 3 and 4 to the final stage, which will consist of two groups each group where five clubs first climb and the second from each group to the 2014–15 Iraqi Premier League next season.

=== Number of teams by Iraqi Governorates ===
Governorate	Teams	Name of Teams
Center
Baghdad	4	Al-Kahraba, Al-Hedood, Al-Oloom wal-Technologia, and Al-Jaish
Salahaddin	1	Masafi Al-Shamal
North
Sulaymaniyah	1	Sulaymaniya
Middle Euphrates
Muthana	1	Samawa
Najaf	1	Naft Al-Wasat
South
Maysan	1	Maysan
Basra	1	Al-Bahri

== Final stage ==
The final stage will be two groups, each team plays one game in a group with other teams. The top two teams from each group to the 2014–15 Iraqi Premier League next season.

=== Group 1 ===
Pos	Team	Pld	W	D	L	GF	GA	GD	Pts	Promotion
1	Naft Al-Wasat (P)	3	2	1	0	4	0	+4	7	Promotion to the Iraqi Premier League
2	Sulaymaniya (P)	3	1	2	0	3	2	+1	5	Promotion to the Iraqi Premier League
3	Maysan	3	1	1	1	4	5	−1	4	
4	Samawa	3	0	0	3	2	6	−4	0	
5	Masafi Al-Shamal (withdrew)	0	0	0	0	0	0	0	0	

Updated to match(es) played on 14 August 2014. Source: Goalzz.com
Rules for classification: 1) points; 2) goal difference; 3) number of goals scored.
(P) Promoted

=== Group 2 ===
Pos	Team	Pld	W	D	L	GF	GA	GD	Pts	Promotion
1	Al-Kahraba (P)	4	2	2	0	7	3	+4	8	Promotion to the Iraqi Premier League
2	Al-Hedood (P)	4	2	2	0	4	2	+2	8	Promotion to the Iraqi Premier League
3	Al-Oloom wal-Technologia	4	2	1	1	6	3	+3	7	
4	Al-Jaish	4	0	2	2	6	9	−3	2	
5	Al-Bahri	4	0	1	3	3	9	−6	1	

Updated to match(es) played on 14 August 2014. Source: Goalzz.com
Rules for classification: 1) points; 2) goal difference; 3) number of goals scored.
(P) Promoted

== Others ==
- 2013–14 Iraqi Premier League
