= Mustafa Mohammed =

Iraqi footballer (born 1998)

Personal information
- Full name: Mustafa Mohammed Jebur Maslukhi
- Date of birth: 14 January 1998 (age 28)
- Place of birth: Iraq
- Position: Defender

Team information
- Current team: Naft Maysan SC
- Number: 2

Youth career
- –2014: Al-Jaish

Senior career*
Years	Team	Apps	(Gls)
2014–2015	Al-Kahraba		
2015	Al-Shorta		
2015–2017	Al-Talaba		
2017–2021	Al-Zawraa	12	(0)
2021–2022	Al-Quwa Al-Jawiya	6	(0)
2022–23	Al-Zawraa	1	(0)
2023-24	Mes Rafsanjan	1	(0)
2024	Karbala SC		
2024-	Naft Maysan SC	6	(0)

International career^{‡}
2018–	Iraq	12	(0)
- * Club domestic league appearances and goals as of 27/12/24 @ 17:46(AEST) ‡ National team caps and goals as of 12 January 2021

Mustafa Mohammed (born 14 January 1998) is an Iraqi footballer who plays as a defender for Al-Zawraa in Iraqi Premier League, as well as the Iraq national team.

== International career ==
On 28 February 2018, Mustafa earned his first international cap with Iraq against Saudi Arabia in a friendly.

== Personal life ==
Mustafa's younger brother Muntadher Mohammed is also a footballer and was his teammate at Al-Zawraa between 2019 and 2021.

== Honours ==
=== Club ===
Al-Zawraa

- Iraqi Premier League: 2017–18
- Iraq FA Cup: 2018–19
