= Jamal Ali =

Iraqi footballer (born 1956)

Personal information
- Full name: Jamal Ali Hamza
- Date of birth: 2 February 1956 (age 70)
- Place of birth: Iraq
- Position: Midfielder

Senior career*
Years	Team	Apps	(Gls)
1974–1987	Talaba SC		

International career
1980–1986	Iraq	19	(0)

Managerial career
- 1988–1990: Al-Talaba
- 1995–1996: Al-Talaba
- 2011–2012: Al-Talaba
- 2012–2013: Duhok
- 2013: Al-Naft
- 2013: Al-Minaa
- 2014: Al-Zawraa
- 2017–2018: Al Hamriyah
- 2018: Al-Arabi
- 2020–2021: Naft Al-Wasat
- 2021: Amanat Baghdad SC
- * Club domestic league appearances and goals

Jamal Ali Hamza (Arabic: جَمَال عَلِيّ حَمْزَة; born 2 February 1956) is an Iraqi football midfielder who played for Iraq in the 1986 FIFA World Cup. He also played for and now coaches Al Minaa.

Jamal Ali played for the Iraqi Olympic team at the 1980 Olympics in Moscow. He was later turned into a left back.

He was selected by Brazilian coach Evaristo de Macedo in Iraq's 1986 World Cup squad but he was also one of four squad members who did not get an appearance in Mexico.

He made 17 international appearances for Iraq, and was part of the Iraqi B team that finished second to South Korea in the 1977 Merdeka Cup.

== Managerial statistics ==
As of 6 November 2021

Team	Nat	From	To	Record				
Team	Nat	From	To	G	W	D	L	Win %
Al-Talaba	(Iraq)	6 September 2011	20 August 2012	38	19	11	8	50.00
Duhok	(Iraq)	21 August 2012	10 February 2013	15	7	6	2	46.67
Al-Naft	(Iraq)	1 March 2013	18 September 2013	20	11	1	8	55.00
Al-Mina'a	(Iraq)	21 September 2013	30 December 2013	10	2	4	4	20.00
Al-Zawraa	(Iraq)	4 July 2014	6 October 2014	2	1	0	1	50.00
Al Hamriyah	(United Arab Emirates)	9 May 2017	6 January 2018	14	6	3	5	42.86
Al-Arabi	(United Arab Emirates)	18 February 2018	2 December 2018	16	3	2	11	18.75
Naft Al-Wasat	(Iraq)	2 July 2020	19 January 2021	19	12	3	4	63.16
Amanat Baghdad SC	(Iraq)	19 July 2021	6 November 2021	8	1	3	4	12.50
Total				142	62	33	47	43.66
