= Naft Al-Wasat SC =

Association football club in Iraq

Naft Al-Wasat
- Full name: Naft Al-Wasat Sports Club
- Nickname: Andaleeb Al-Furat (The Euphrates Nightingales)
- Founded: 2008; 18 years ago
- Ground: Al-Najaf International Stadium (league); Naft Al-Wasat Stadium (cup)
- Capacity: 30,000 (league); 5,000 (cup)
- President: Dawood Salem Ahmed
- Manager: Imad Aoude
- League: Iraqi Premier Division League
- 2025–26: Iraqi Premier Division League, 8th of 20
Home colours	Away colours

Naft Al-Wasat Sports Club (Arabic: نادي نفط الوسط الرياضي, lit. 'Midland Oil') is an Iraqi sports club based in Najaf. Its professional football team plays in the Iraqi Premier Division League, the second tier of Iraqi football. The club's home stadium is An-Najaf Stadium.

Founded in 2008, Naft Al-Wasat spent three seasons in the Iraqi Second Division League and another three in the Iraqi First Division League until they were promoted from the 2013–14 Iraqi First Division League to the Iraqi Premier League. In their first season in the Iraqi Premier League, Naft Al-Wasat became the champions by achieving the 2014–15 Iraqi Premier League.

Their futsal club has participated in the AFC Futsal Club Championship.

== History ==
Naft Al-Wasat SC was found on 1 July 2008 by the Ministry of Oil. The founding board consisted of Riyadh Bahr Al-Ouloom, Abbas Fakhruddin, Firas Nouri, Haitham Abbas, Ali Juwad, Yasin Khudhair, Mustafa Mohammed, Hassan Juwad, Wisam Fawzi and Basim Radhi. The club entered the Iraqi Second Division League and was promoted to the Iraqi First Division League in the 2010–11 season. In the 2011–12 season, Naft Al-Wasat made their first transfer from other clubs, signing Karrar Abd from Kufa FC in January 2012. In the 2011–12 season, Naft Al-Wasat barely qualified for the second stage, after having 8 wins, 6 draws and 4 losses, only a point away from Kufa FC. In the second stage, Naft Al-Wasat finished in 4th place in Group 2, at 12 points, with 4 wins and 4 losses, ending their first season in the First Division League in failure.

In the 2012–13 season, Naft Al-Wasat failed again to qualify. In the groups stage, they became in top of Group D, at 27 points, being won 7 matches, drawn in 5 and lost only one. In the second stage they had a big breakdown, finishing in 5th place in Group 2, after winning only one match, drawing in 5 and losing 3. In the 2012–13 Iraq FA Cup, they reached the third round before being eliminated. In the first round, they defeated Samawa 4–0, and in the second round they eliminated Al-Sinaat Al-Kahrabaiya by beating them 4–3 on aggregate (the first leg was 1–1 and the second leg was 3–2). In the third round, they lost the first leg to Masafi Al-Wasat 2–1 and drew the second leg 2–2, being knocked out 4–3 on aggregate.

After the 2012–13 season, the technical staff was changed, signing the manager, Abdul Ghani Shahad, on 27 August 2013. In the 2013–14 season, Naft Al-Wasat were promoted for the first time in their history. They were in top of Group E at 34 points, 8 points away from Al-Diwaniya FC, which was a big difference from last seasons. In the second stage, Naft Al-Wasat took the Group 4 lead, at 20 points, by winning 6 matches and drawing in two. They ended their season as the leaders of Group 1 in the last stage, claiming promotion to the Iraqi Premier League.

After the end of the 2013–14 season, the club made major changes to get ready for the 2014–15 Iraqi Premier League with the total of 8 players signed, but the most important signing was Noor Sabri. Naft Al-Wasat were one of the teams that weren't expected to qualify to the second stage. Despite losing a third of their games in the first stage, finishing in 4th position out of ten teams in their group, Naft Al-Wasat just about managed to qualify for the final stage, after wins against the likes of Erbil and Al-Zawraa; this itself was considered a big success for the young team. In the second stage, the team surprised everyone by defeating Al Shorta SC (the defending champions and one of the strongest contenders for the league championship) twice. After taking the Group 1 lead, Naft Al-Wasat got qualified to the league final, where they won over Al-Quwa Al-Jawiya via a penalty shoot-out.

Their league title win qualified them for the 2016 AFC Cup. They finished top of Group B with a record of five wins and one loss, but they lost 1–0 in the round of 16 to Al-Jaish. They were not allowed to play their home matches in Iraq in this tournament due to security concerns. In the 2015–16 Iraqi Premier League, Naft Al-Wasat finished in second place in their group, behind eventual champions Al-Zawraa, to qualify for the final stage. In the final stage, Naft Al-Wasat finished as runners-up, again behind Al-Zawraa. As the league's runners-up, Naft Al-Wasat qualified for the 2016–17 Arab Club Championship, where they got revenge on Al-Jaish by knocking them out to qualify for the group stage.

== Records ==
After achieving the 2014–15 Iraqi Premier League, Naft Al-Wasat became the second team to be crowned as the Iraqi Premier League champions in their first season, the other being Al-Zawra'a in the 1975–76 season. Naft Al-Wasat are also the first team from Najaf to achieve the league and the fifth team that isn't from Baghdad to achieve it since its start in 1974.

== Statistics ==
The season-by-season performance of the club over the recent years:

Season	League	Rank	P	W	D	L	F	A	GD	Pts	Cup
2011–12	Iraqi First Division League	3 – Group 2	26	12	6	8	29	23	+6	42	—
2012–13	Iraqi First Division League	5 – Group 2	23	8	11	4	29	20	+9	35	R32
2013–14	Iraqi First Division League	1 – Group 1	25	18	7	0	45	12	+33	61	—
2014–15	Iraqi Premier League	1	25	13	6	6	24	15	+9	45	—
2015–16	Iraqi Premier League	2	24	14	7	3	34	20	+14	49	R16
2016–17	Iraqi Premier League	5	36	19	11	6	45	26	+19	68	RU
2017–18	Iraqi Premier League	9	38	10	19	9	42	38	+4	49	—
2018–19	Iraqi Premier League	7	38	11	17	10	38	37	+1	50	R16
2019–20^{(1)}	Iraqi Premier League	—	7	5	0	2	8	4	—	—	R16^{(2)}
2020–21	Iraqi Premier League	5	38	16	15	7	46	31	+15	63	R32
2021–22	Iraqi Premier League	5	38	17	13	8	50	36	+14	64	R16
2022–23	Iraqi Premier League	18	38	5	21	12	26	34	–8	36	R16
2023–24	Iraq Stars League	20	38	1	13	24	24	65	–41	16	2R
2024–25	Iraqi Premier Division League	18	38	8	18	12	28	32	–4	42	1R
2025–26	Iraqi Premier Division League	8	38	12	14	12	40	47	–7	50	1R

As of 25 May 2026. Rank = Rank in the league; P = Played; W = Win; D = Draw; L = Loss; F = Goals for; A = Goals against; GD = Goal difference; Pts = Points; Cup = Iraq FA Cup.
in = Still in competition; — = Not attended; 1R = 1st round; 2R = 2nd round; 3R = 3rd round; R16 = Round of sixteen; QF = Quarterfinals; SF = Semifinals.

^{1} The league was not completed and was cancelled.
^{2} Naft Al-Wasat had not yet been eliminated from the cup but it was abandoned midway through.

== Current squad ==
=== First-team squad ===
As of 30 May 2024

Note: Flags indicate national team as defined under FIFA eligibility rules; some limited exceptions apply. Players may hold more than one non-FIFA nationality.

No.	Pos.	Nation	Player
2	DF	IRQ	Mohammed Ali
6	MF	IRQ	Ali Qasim
7	FW	IRQ	Samer Muhsin
13	MF	IRQ	Karrar Jassim
14	FW	IRQ	Muntadher Shalaan
15	DF	IRQ	Hassan Khaery
24	MF	GAB	Nathaniel Mbourou
33	FW	IRQ	Ahmed Lafta Kony
37	MF	IRQ	Abbas Jassim
40	GK	IRQ	Mustafa Zohair

No.	Pos.	Nation	Player
44	DF	MTN	Bakary N'Diaye
55	DF	IRQ	Naji Natiq
66	MF	IRQ	Layth Tahseen
70	DF	IRQ	Kareem Deli
71	FW	IRQ	Hussein Abdul-Wahid
91	FW	IRQ	Ahmed Turky
94	FW	COL	Sebastián Rincón
95	FW	IRQ	Mortaja Adel
98	DF	IRQ	Luíz Fernando

== Current technical staff ==
Position	Name	Nationality
Manager:	Imad Aoude	(Iraq)
Assistant manager:		(Iraq)
Assistant manager:		(Iraq)
Goalkeeping coach:		(Iraq)
Fitness coach:		(Iraq)
Technical and Statistical Analyst:		(Iraq)
U-19 Manager:		(Iraq)
Director of football:		(Iraq)
Administrative director:	Firas Bahrul-Oloom	(Iraq)

Updated to match played 3 July 2020
Source: almaalomah.com

== Managerial history ==
- (Iraq) Abdul Ghani Shahad (2013–2015)
- (Egypt) Hamza El-Gamal (2015–2016)
- (Iraq) Thair Ahmed (2016–2017)
- (Iraq) Adel Nima (2017–2018)
- (Iraq) Emad Mohammed (Feb 2018–June 2018)
- (Iraq) Majed Najem (June 2018–Dec 2018)
- (Iraq) Radhi Shenaishil (2018–2020)
- (Iraq) Jamal Ali (2020–2021)
- (Iraq) Abdul Ghani Shahad (2021–present)

== Honours ==
=== Domestic ===
- Iraq Stars League
  - Champions (1): 2014–15
  - Runners-up (1): 2015–16
- Iraq FA Cup
  - Runners-up (1): 2016–17

== Performance in international competitions ==
- AFC Cup: 1 appearance

2016: Round of 16

- Arab Club Championship: 1 appearance

2017: Group stage
