= Ameer Sabah =

Iraqi footballer

Amir Sabah
Personal information
- Full name: Ameer Sabah Hussein Al Hamadani
- Date of birth: January 10, 1988 (age 38)
- Place of birth: Iraq
- Position: Winger

Team information
- Current team: Al-Zawraa

Senior career*
Years	Team	Apps	(Gls)
2006–2009	Al-Shorta		
2009–2010	Baghdad		
2010–2012	Zakho		
2012–2015	Baghdad		
2015	Zakho		
2015–2016	Al-Shorta		
2016–2017	Al-Najaf		
2017–2020	Al-Zawraa		

International career^{‡}
2011–2013	Iraq	4	(0)
- * Club domestic league appearances and goals as of N/A ‡ National team caps and goals as of N/A

Ameer Sabah Hussein Al-Hamadani (Arabic: امير صباح حسين الحمداني, born 10 January 1988 in Baghdad, Iraq) is an Iraqi football winger playing for Al-Zawraa in Iraqi Premier League.

== Honours ==
=== Club ===
Al-Zawraa

- Iraqi Premier League: 2017–18
- Iraq FA Cup: 2018–19
- Iraqi Super Cup: 2017
