= Mohammed Abdul-Zahra =

Iraqi footballer

Personal information
- Full name: Mohammed Abdul-Zahra
- Date of birth: 14 October 1989 (age 37)
- Place of birth: Iraq
- Position: Defender

Team information
- Current team: Al-Minaa
- Number: 55

Senior career*
Years	Team	Apps	(Gls)
2006–2010	Al-Naft		
2010–2014	Al-Quwa Al-Jawiya		
2014–2017	Al-Talaba		
2017	Al-Najaf		
2017–2020	Al-Zawraa		
2020–2023	Al-Najaf		
2023	Al-Minaa		
2023-2024	Al-Najaf		
2024	Al Sina'a		

International career^{‡}
2011	Iraq U-23	3	(0)
2010–	Iraq	2	(1)
2013	Iraq Military	10	(1)
- * Club domestic league appearances and goals as of N/A ‡ National team caps and goals as of July 12, 2013

Mohammed Abdul-Zahra (Arabic: مُحَمَّد عَبْد الزَّهْرَة; born 14 October 1989), or simply Abu Haloub (Arabic: أَبُو حَالُوب), is an Iraqi footballer who plays as a defender for Al-Minaa.

== Career ==
=== International career ===
Goals for Iraq

#	Date	Venue	Opponent	Score	Result	Competition
1.	29 May 2021	Al Fayhaa Stadium, Basra, Iraq	Nepal	2–2	6–2	Friendly

== Honours ==
Al-Zawraa

- Iraqi Premier League: 2017–18
- Iraq FA Cup: 2018–19
- Iraqi Super Cup: 2017

Al-Minaa

- Iraqi First Division League: 2022–23

Iraq

- CISM World Football Trophy: 2013
