= Wathiq Aswad =

Iraqi footballer

Personal information
- Date of birth: 1 July 1957 (age 69)
- Position: Defender

Senior career*
Years	Team	Apps	(Gls)
1974-1982	Al-Talaba SC		
1982-1983	Al-Jaish SC		
1983-1988	Al-Talaba SC		

International career
1976–1982	Iraq		

Managerial career
- 2003: Al-Naft
- * Club domestic league appearances and goals

Wathiq Aswad (born 1 July 1957) is an Iraqi former footballer. He competed in the men's tournament at the 1980 Summer Olympics.
