= Khalid Mohammed Sabbar =

Iraqi footballer

Personal information
- Date of birth: 23 February 1973 (age 53)
- Place of birth: Iraq
- Position: Defender

Team information
- Current team: Iraq U-20

Senior career*
Years	Team	Apps	(Gls)
1995–1997	Al-Zawraa	-	(-)
2000–2005	Al-Shorta	-	(-)
2005–2006	Erbil	-	(-)
2006–2009	Kirkuk FC	-	(-)
2008–2011	Al-Ramadi SC	-	(-)

International career
1996–2002	Iraq	30	(1)

Managerial career
- 2016: Al-Kahraba
- 2018: Al-Kahraba
- 2019–: Iraq U-20
- * Club domestic league appearances and goals

Khalid Mohammed Sabbar (Arabic: خَالِد مُحَمَّد صَبَّار; born 23 February 1973) is an Iraqi former football defender who played for Iraq in the 1996 Asian Cup. Professionally he played for Al Zawra, Al Shorta, Arbil FC, Kirkuk FC and Al Ramadi.

Sabbar is remembered for scoring the 20-yard winner over Iran at the 1996 Asian Cup in Dubai, U.A.E. The goal scored helped Iraq to a 2–0 lead, came after good build-up play on the left of the Iranian box by Hussam Fawzi and Qahtan Chathir, the ball was eventually laid back for Khalid, who had only come on 20 minutes earlier as a substitute, his powerful shot found the back of the net and the celebrations began, Khalid sank to one knee and wept in delight.

He made his name during the 1996 Olympic qualifiers, where Iraq was only a game away from qualifying for Atlanta Olympics, the team which included goalkeeper Saad Nassir, defender Haidar Mahmoud, midfielder Abbas Obaid and strikers Qahtan Chathir and Hussam Fawzi lost 1–0 to Saudi Arabia in extra-time in a play-off.

== Career statistics ==
=== International goals ===
Scores and results list Iraq's goal tally first.

No	Date	Venue	Opponent	Score	Result	Competition
1.	5 December 1996	Al-Maktoum Stadium, Dubai	Iran	2–0	2–1	1996 AFC Asian Cup

== Coaching career ==
Sabbar left Al-Kahrabaa FC the in November of the 2018–2019 season, after one win out of 8 games in the league.

=== Managerial statistics ===
As of 17 May 2019

Team	Nat	From	To	Record				
Team	Nat	From	To	G	W	D	L	Win %
Al-Kahrabaa FC	(Iraq)	24 March 2018	7 November 2018	30	9	10	11	30.00
Total				30	9	10	11	30.00
