= Wissam Saadoun =

Iraqi footballer

Personal information
- Full name: Wisam Saadoon Fenjan
- Date of birth: 21 November 1990 (age 35)
- Place of birth: Maysan, Iraq
- Position: Midfielder

Team information
- Current team: Naft Maysan
- Number: 15

Youth career
- –2009: Naft Maysan

Senior career*
Years	Team	Apps	(Gls)
2009–	Naft Maysan	?	(39)

International career^{‡}
2018	Iraq	1	(0)
- * Club domestic league appearances and goals as of 20 November 2018 ‡ National team caps and goals as of 20 November 2018

Wisam Saadoon Fenjan (Arabic: وِسَام سَعْدُون فِنْجَان; born 21 November 1990) is an Iraqi professional footballer who currently plays for Naft Maysan in the Iraqi Premier League.

== International debut ==
On November 20, 2018 Wissam Saedon made his first international cap with Iraq against Bolivia in a friendly match.

== Honours ==
=== Individual ===
- 2017–18 Iraqi Premier League top-scorer (24 goals)
