= Mohammed Tabra =

Iraqi association football player

Personal information
- Full name: Mohammed Tabra
- Date of birth: 23 December 1950 (age 75)
- Place of birth: Iraq
- Position: Defender

Senior career*
Years	Team	Apps	(Gls)
1967–1974	Al-Kahraba		
1974–1980	Al-Shorta		

International career
1975–1978	Iraq		

Managerial career
- 1984: Al-Shorta
- 1985: Al-Shorta
- 1989–1990: Al-Shorta
- 1991–1992: Al-Shorta
- 2000: Al-Talaba
- 2002: Al-Naft
- 2012: Al-Shorta
- * Club domestic league appearances and goals

Mohammed Tabra (born 23 December 1950) is a former Iraqi football defender who played for Iraq in the 1976 AFC Asian Cup. He played for the national team between 1975 and 1978.

Tabra made his international debut in a 6–0 win over Afghanistan in 1975 in Baghdad.
