= Mahdi Karim =

Iraqi footballer

Personal information
- Full name: Mahdi Karim Ajeel
- Date of birth: December 10, 1983 (age 42)
- Place of birth: Baghdad, Iraq
- Height: 1.74 m (5 ft 8 1/2 in)
- Positions: Winger; right back

Youth career
- 1995–1996: Al-Shorta
- 1996–1997: Al-Khutoot
- 1997–1998: Al-Sulaikh
- 1998–1999: Al-Shabab

Senior career*
Years	Team	Apps	(Gls)
1999–2000	Al-Shabab		
2000–2002	Al Naft		
2001	→ Al-Zawraa (loan)		
2002–2005	Al Talaba		
2005–2007	Apollon Limassol	43	(10)
2007–2008	Al Ahly Tripoli	18	(11)
2008–2009	Al-Khor	19	(3)
2009–2013	Erbil SC		
2013–2015	Al-Shorta		(2)
2015–2017	Al-Talaba		

International career
2001–2018	Iraq	110	(11)
Medal record
Men's football
Representing Iraq
AFC Asian Cup
Winner	2007 Indonesia/Malaysia/ Thailand/Vietnam
- * Club domestic league appearances and goals

Mahdi Karim Ajeel (Arabic: مَهْدِيّ كَرِيم عَجِيل; born December 10, 1983) is an Iraqi former footballer. He last played as a winger for Al-Talaba and the Iraq national football team.

== Player info ==
Mahdi Kareem Ajeel's successful conversion to a right winger initially came as a result of his failure claim a more central striking role in the face of competition from the likes of Younis Mahmoud. Kareem's club career began with Al Naft, where he displayed his predatory instincts by scoring regularly for the local powerhouse. However, his career as a centre-forward effectively ended when he moved to Al Talaba in 2002.

With Alaa Kadhim, Younis Mahmoud, and Ahmed Salah prioritised over Kareem, the younger player found himself switched to the right wing. He adapted quickly to his new position; it was on the wing that Kareem really came into his own.

Having thrived in his new role at the club level, he quickly broke into the Iraqi Olympic team under Adnan Hamad. There, he formed one half of a dynamic wing duo with Hawar Mulla Mohammed, whose surging down the left flank were as significant as Kareem's in breaking down opposition defences. Both figured prominently with the Iraq junior side as they came through Asia's hard-fought qualifying round to book an appearance at the 2004 Athens Olympics, where they would stun the watching world by storming into the last four.

The high point of Kareem's international career arrived later in the year when Iraq won their first continental title at year's AFC Asian Cup. He also figured prominently in Iraq's qualifying campaign for the 2010 FIFA World Cup in South Africa, scoring four times in the 7–0 victory over Pakistan. This display helped earn him a move to Al Ahly Tripoli, where he has scored 11 times in 18 appearances. Then he went to the Qatari Club Al-Khor, where he had a great season. In 2009, Iraq played disastrous Gulf Cup. After that he moved to the Iraqi club Arbil FC. He made great matches in the AFC Cup against Al-Kuwait, where he also scored a goal.

== International goals ==
Scores and results list Iraq's goal tally first.

#	Date	Venue	Opponent	Score	Result	Competition
1.	8 June 2005	King Abdullah Stadium, Amman	Jordan	1–0	1–0	Friendly
2.	1 March 2006	Sheikh Khalifa International Stadium, Al Ain	China	1–0	2–1	2007 AFC Asian Cup qualification
3.	11 October 2006	Sheikh Khalifa International Stadium, Al Ain	Singapore	2–1	4–2	2007 AFC Asian Cup qualification
4.	22 October 2007	Punjab Stadium, Lahore	Pakistan	2–0	7–0	2010 FIFA World Cup qualification
5.	22 October 2007	Punjab Stadium, Lahore	Pakistan	3–0	7–0	2010 FIFA World Cup qualification
6.	22 October 2007	Punjab Stadium, Lahore	Pakistan	6–0	7–0	2010 FIFA World Cup qualification
7.	22 October 2007	Punjab Stadium, Lahore	Pakistan	7–0	7–0	2010 FIFA World Cup qualification
8.	17 May 2008	Abbasiyyin Stadium, Damascus	Syria	1–2	1–2	Friendly
9.	9 June 2009	University of the Western Cape Stadium, Cape Town	Poland	1–0	1–1	Friendly
10.	18 November 2009	Tahnoun bin Mohamed Stadium, Al Ain	United Arab Emirates	1–0	1–0	2009 UAE International Cup
11.	11 November 2010	Sharjah Stadium, Sharjah	India	2–0	2–0	Friendly

== Honours ==
=== Club ===
- Iraqi Premier League
  - Winner: 1
    - 2011–12 with Erbil
- Iraq FA Cup
  - Winner: 1
    - 2002–03 with Al-Talaba
- Iraqi Super Cup
  - Winner: 1
    - 2002 with Al-Talaba
- Cypriot First Division
  - Winner: 1
    - 2005–06 with Apollon Limassol
- Cypriot Super Cup
  - Winner: 1
    - 2006 with Apollon Limassol

=== Country ===
- 4th place in 2004 Athens Olympics
- 2007 Asian Cup winner
- 2012 Arab Nations Cup Bronze medallist

=== Individual ===
- Champion with Apollon Limassol FC (CYP) in 2005–2006
- Best Foreign Player (Libyan Premier League 2007–08) (voting sponsored by Libyana and Al-Madar)
- Goal of the Season (Libyan Premier League 2007–08, against Al-Madina) (voting sponsored by Libyana and Al-Madar)

== See also ==
- List of men's footballers with 100 or more international caps
