= Ihab Kadhim =

Iraqi footballer

Personal information
- Full name: Ihab Kadhim Mhawesh Khlaifawi
- Date of birth: 1 July 1994 (age 32)
- Place of birth: Baghdad, Iraq
- Height: 1.70 m (5 ft 7 in)
- Position: Midfielder

Team information
- Current team: Al-Sinaa

Senior career*
Years	Team	Apps	(Gls)
2011–2013	Al-Talaba		(8)
2013–2015	Al-Quwa Al-Jawiya		
2015–2020	Al-Talaba		(2)
2020–2021	Zakho		
2021–	Al-Sinaa		

International career
2011–2013	Iraq U20		
2013	Iraq	1	(0)
- * Club domestic league appearances and goals as of 29 April 2021

Ihab Kadhim Mhawesh Khlaifawi (Arabic: إيهاب كاظم مهاوش خليفاوي; born 1 July 1994) is an Iraqi professional footballer who plays as a midfielder for Iraqi Premier League club Al-Sinaa.

== International career ==
Ihab was called up for the 2013 FIFA U-20 World Cup and 2014 WAFF Championship.
