= Shaker Mahmoud =

Iraqi footballer

Shaker Mahmoud Hamza
Personal information
- Full name: Shaker Mahmoud Hamza
- Date of birth: 5 May 1963 (age 63)
- Place of birth: Iraq
- Height: 1.75 m (5 ft 9 in)
- Position: Midfielder

Senior career*
Years	Team	Apps	(Gls)
1980–1984	Al-Sinaa SC		
1984–1986	Al-Rasheed		
1986–1987	Al-Shorta SC		
1987–1991	Al-Quwa Al-Jawiya		
1991–1994	Al-Sinaa SC		
1994–1997	Al-Shorta SC		

International career
1983–1986	Iraq	28	(4)

Managerial career
- 1997: Kara FC
- 1998: Zeravani SC
- 1999–2001: Al-Shorta SC (Assist.)
- 2001–2002: Al-Samawa FC
- 2004: Duhok SC
- 2006: Al-Jaish SC
- 2007–2008: Al-Shorta SC
- 2008: Al-Sulaymaniyah FC
- 2009–2011: Al-Kahraba
- 2012–2013: Al-Naft
- 2014–2015: Al-Kahraba
- 2016: Al-Talaba SC (Assist.)
- 2017–2018: Iraq (Assist.)
- 2020–2021: Al-Samawa FC
- * Club domestic league appearances and goals

Shaker Mahmoud Hamza (Arabic: شَاكِر مَحْمُود حَمْزَة; born 5 May 1963) is an Iraqi former football midfielder who played for Iraq in the 1986 FIFA World Cup. He also played for Al-Shabab.

He was part of Iraq's second Olympic Games campaign in 1984 in Los Angeles, United States, where he played in all three games against Canada, Cameroon and Yugoslavia. Two years later, he played in the World Cup in Mexico, making a second-half substitute appearance for Anad Abid in Iraq’s last game against the hosts. He scored the last goal in the 3-1 win over Syria that qualified Iraq for their first World Cup appearance.

== Career statistics ==
=== International goals ===
Scores and results list Iraq's goal tally first.

No	Date	Venue	Opponent	Score	Result	Competition
1.	8 July 1985	King Fahd Stadium, Taif	Mauritania	2–0	2–0	1985 Arab Cup
2.	29 November 1985	King Fahd Stadium, Taif	Syria	2–1	3–1	1986 FIFA World Cup qualification

== Managerial statistics ==
As of match played 9 March 2021

Managerial record by team and tenure
Team	From	To	Record					Ref.
Team	From	To	P	W	D	L	Win %	Ref.
Al-Naft SC	11 December 2012	16 February 2013	7	2	3	2	28.6	
Al-Samawa FC	14 December 2020	9 March 2021	15	2	5	8	13.3	
Total			22	4	8	10	18.2	—
