= Ali Mahmud =

Ali Mahmud عالي محمود
- Village
- Location within Iran
- Coordinates: 33°19′47″N 49°33′12″E
- Country: Iran
- Province: Lorestan
- County: Aligudarz
- Bakhsh: Central
- Rural District: Pachehlak-e Sharqi

Population (2006)
  - Total: 205
- Time zone: UTC+3:30 (IRST)
  - Summer (DST): UTC+4:30 (IRDT)

Ali Mahmud (Persian: عالي محمود, also Romanized as ‘Ālī Maḩmūd, Ali Mahmood, Ālī Maḩmūd, and Āl Mahmūd) is a village in Pachehlak-e Sharqi Rural District, in the Central District of Aligudarz County, Lorestan Province, Iran. At the 2006 census, its population was 205, in 35 families.
