= Abdul-Qadir Tariq =

Iraqi footballer

Personal information
- Full name: Abdul-Qadir Tariq Aziz Al-Rubaie
- Date of birth: 25 January 1994 (age 32)
- Place of birth: Baghdad, Iraq
- Height: 1.75 m (5 ft 9 in)
- Position: Forward

Youth career
- 2011: Al-Shorta

Senior career*
Years	Team	Apps	(Gls)
2011–2015	Al-Karkh		(14)
2015–2016	Al-Talaba	17	(10)
2016–2018	Al-Shorta		
2018	→ Al-Talaba (loan)		
2018–2019	Al-Talaba		
2019–2020	Al-Naft		
2020–2021	Al-Talaba		
2021–2022	Amanat Baghdad		
2022-2023	Al-Diwaniya SC		
2023–2025	Karbala SC		
2025–2026	Najran		

International career
2015	Iraq U23	2	(1)
2014	Iraq	2	(0)
- * Club domestic league appearances and goals as of 27/12/24 @ 12:06(AEST)

Abdul-Qadir Tariq Aziz Al-Rubaie (Arabic: عَبْد الْقَادِر طَارِق عَزِيز الرَّبِيعِيّ; born 25 January 1994) is an Iraqi professional footballer who plays as a striker. His father, Tariq Aziz, and his older brother, Ziyad Tariq, are both former players.

On 2 October 2025, Abdul-Qadir Tariq joined Saudi Second Division club Najran.

== International debut ==
On 25 December 2014 Abdul Qadir Tariq made his International debut against Uzbekistan in a friendly match that ended 0–1 for Uzbekistan

== International statistics ==
=== Iraq national under-23 team goals ===
Scores and results list Iraq's goal tally first.

#	Date	Venue	Opponent	Score	Result	Competition
1.	28 March 2015	Sultan Qaboos Sports Complex, Muscat, Oman	Maldives	5–1	7–1	2016 AFC U-23 Asian Cup qual.
