= Mustafa Agha =

Syrian sports journalist (born 1963)

- Born: Mustafa Khalid Agha مصطفى خالد آلاغا; June 6, 1963 (age 63); Damascus, Syria
- Education: Damascus University
- Occupation: Sports journalist
- Years active: 1981–present
- Employer: MBC 1 (Middle East and North Africa)
- Spouses: Salma Almasry (divorced): Mai Al Khatib
- Children: 2

Mustafa Khalid Agha (Arabic: مصطفى خالد آلاغا عبدله صالح; born June 6, 1963) is a British-Syrian sports journalist for the Middle East Broadcasting Center in Dubai, United Arab Emirates. He is best known for his Arabic language programs about soccer and Arab and world sports, and he is one of the foremost authorities on sports in the Middle East.

== Personal life ==
Mustafa Agha was born on June 6, 1963, in Yarmouk, Damascus, Syria. At an early age, he was interested in sports, and at 15, he created his own sports magazine in the English language. He studied English at Damascus University. He went to the United Kingdom to complete his master's degree and there he obtained British citizenship. He first married Salma Almasry. Later he married Mai Al Khatib, who is a television news presenter on Dubai TV channel. The latter couple has two children, Karam and Natalie.

== Career ==
Agha started his career in journalism in 1981 as a writer. Early in his career, he worked for the Syrian newspaper Alitihad and several TV channels. While in the United Kingdom for his graduate studies, he started working for MBC. He began announcing soccer games for the network, and he became well known for his work on the TV show "Asdda Kas Alallam" (Translated: "World Cup Reverberation"). In 1996, he hosted sports programming for radio, called "Road to World Cup," and on television, called "Makha Al Ryadah" (Translated: "Sports Club"), both of which increased his popularity across the Middle East through these programs. Later, Agha hosted a TV show called Sada Al Mlaeb (Translated: "Playground Reverberation") that was broadcast on MBC 1 (Middle East and North Africa). He currently holds the title of Head of MBC Sports.

== Notable works of journalism ==
Sada Al Malaeb is one of the most widely known and watched TV shows in Arab world culture. It was launched in 1996 by the famous TV presenter Mohamed Al-Shahry, and it was only about Saudi soccer only until Mustafa Al Agha came to the program. After it expanded its coverage of sports, Sada Al Malaeb achieved greater success, and, consequently, it became a daily TV show focusing on Arab and world sports. The program regularly features sports analysts, which distinguishes it from other TV shows.

== In popular culture ==
The Sada Al Malaeb TV show is part of popular Arab culture. Some of the phrases that Mustafa Al Agha has used have become well known. When someone win a competition, he is known to say, "A million trillion tizillion Mabrouk." Other familiar phrases he is known for are "The most beautiful, perfect and most beautiful channel" and "Attach the belts, we will start as usual with titles."

Mustafa Agha's Twitter account is one of the most followed in the Middle East. He has a total following of almost 4.5 million users as of late 2016. In 2016, the audience voted him their "favorite Arab social media influencer" in that category for the Arab Social Media Influencers Summit Award.

He has spoken out on other issues besides sports. He has criticized "sectarian sedition" as one of the dangers in the Arab world. He was one among several Arab celebrities who took to Twitter to condemn the Houthi rebel missile attack on Mecca, Saudi Arabia, in October 2016.

== Awards ==
- He won an award on his program Sada Al Malaeb as the best Arab program three times in a row.
- Mustafa Agha got the best Arab sports programmer covering the European ball from the site of Kouroura.
- Mustafa Agha won the title of the best Arab sports media in the Arab and Saudi referendums.
- In 2007 Mustafa Agha won the Best Studio Provider Award.
- Mustafa Agha awarded the best announcer for sports publications
- Awarded the best announcer for sports bulletins
- ASDA'A Al Malaeb, which was presented by Mustafa Agha, won the best Arab TV show at the 2006 World Cup in Germany.
- Mustafa Agha won the best coverage for Gulfs 13 in Bahrain and 18 in the UAE

== See also ==
- Arab culture#Sports
