= Muthana Khalid =

Iraqi footballer

Personal information
- Full name: Muthana Khalid Salih Al-Masloukhi
- Date of birth: 14 June 1989 (age 37)
- Place of birth: Iraq
- Height: 1.80 m (5 ft 11 in)
- Position: Midfielder

Team information
- Current team: Al-Quwa Al-Jawiya (Reserves Assist. coach)

Senior career*
Years	Team	Apps	(Gls)
2007	Al-Naft		
2007–2013	Al-Quwa Al-Jawiya	?	(5)
2013–2014	Erbil SC		
2014–2015	Al Shorta SC		
2015–2016	Baghdad FC		
2016–2017	Al-Talaba SC		
2017–	Al-Najaf FC		

International career^{‡}
2011–2012	Iraq U23	2	(0)
2009–2013	Iraq	37	(0)

Managerial career
- 2018–: Al-Quwa Al-Jawiya (Reserves Assist. coach)
- * Club domestic league appearances and goals ‡ National team caps and goals as of 20 December 2013

Muthana Khalid Al-Masloukhi (Arabic: مثنى خالد المسلوخي; born June 14, 1989, in Iraq) is an Iraqi midfielder. Muthana Khalid currently plays with Al Shorta SC in Iraq, and for the Iraq national football team. He is combative holding midfielder playing in that position regularly for Iraq national team. In October 2013 Muthana signed for Northern giants Erbil after spending six successful years at jawiya.

== National Team debut ==
In November 2009, Muthanna Khalid was called up for the friendly tournament in UAE. He made his first International debut against Azerbaijan national football team; Iraq won the match 1–0.

== Honors ==
=== International ===
Iraq National football team

- 2012 Arab Nations Cup Bronze medallist
- 2012 WAFF Championship: runner-up

Iraq Military National football team

- 2013 CISM World Football Trophy: Champions
