= Yassir Abdul-Mohsen =

Iraqi footballer (born 1988)

Personal information
- Full name: Yassir Abdul-Mohsen Jabur
- Date of birth: 27 May 1988 (age 38)
- Place of birth: Baghdad, Iraq
- Position: Right winger

Senior career*
Years	Team	Apps	(Gls)
2005–2007	Al-Talaba		
2007–2012	Al-Quwa Al-Jawiya		
2012–2015	Al-Naft		
2015	Zakho		
2015–2017	Al-Talaba		
2017–2018	Amanat Baghdad		
2018–2019	Al-Najaf		
2019	Al-Karkh		
2019–2021	Al-Sinaat Al-Kahrabaiya		
2021–2023	Al-Kahrabaa		

International career^{‡}
2012	Iraq	1	(0)
- * Club domestic league appearances and goals ‡ National team caps and goals as of 7 November 2012

Yassir Abdul-Mohsen Jabur (Arabic: يَاسِر عَبْد الْمُحْسِن جَبْر; born May 27, 1988, in Baghdad, Iraq), is a former Iraqi footballer who played as a right winger.

== International debut ==
On December 3, 2012, Yassir made his full international debut against Bahrain in a friendly match, which the match was ended 0-0.
