= 2017 Iraqi Super Cup =

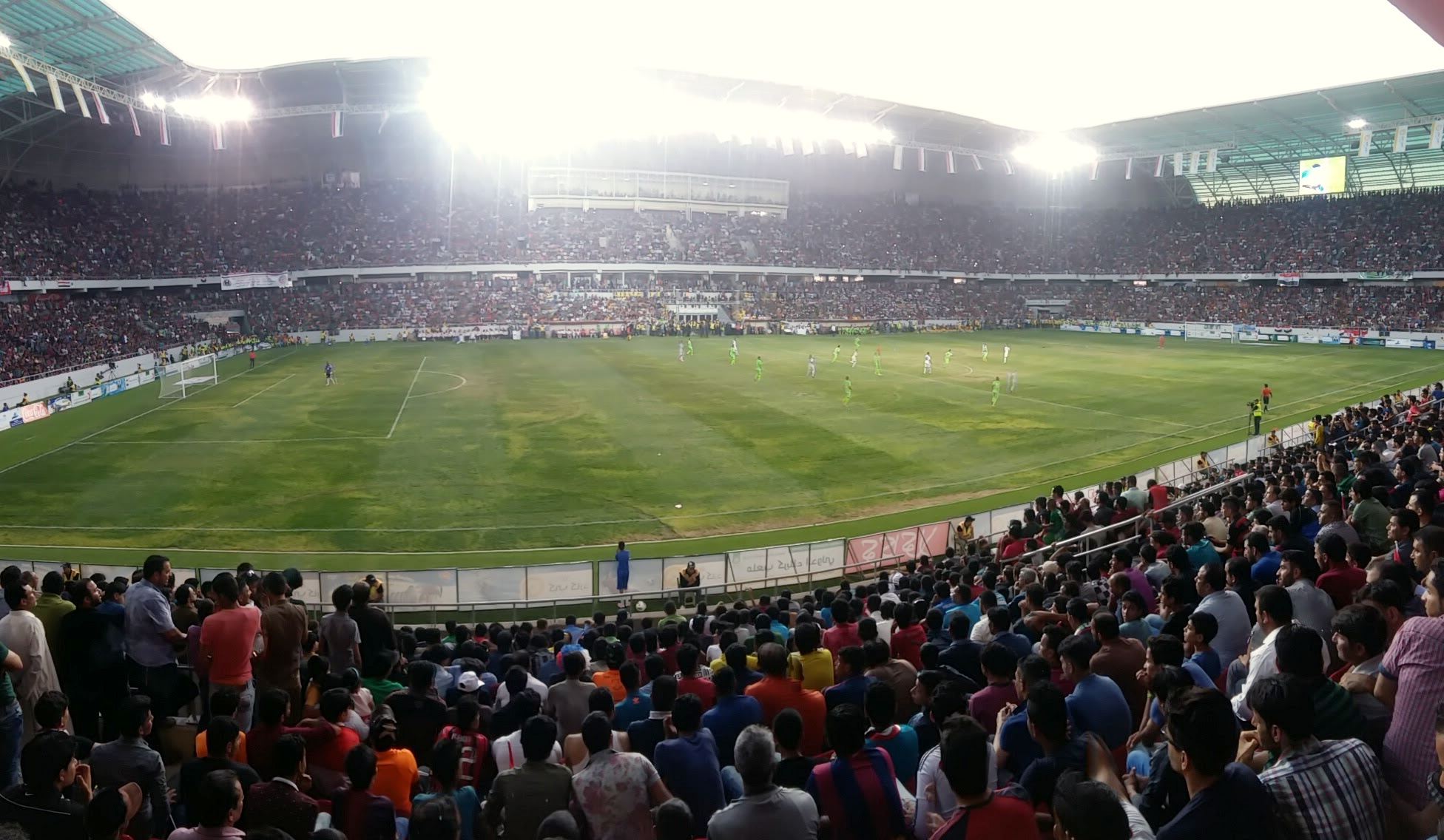
- Karbala International Stadium in Karbala hosted the match.
Al-Quwa Al-Jawiya	Al-Zawraa
1	1
- Al-Zawraa won 3–0 on penalties
- Date: 17 November 2017
- Venue: Karbala International Stadium, Karbala
- Referee: Mohanad Qasim
- Attendance: 30,000

The 2017 Iraqi Super Cup was the 8th edition of the Iraqi Super Cup, and the first since the competition's name was changed from Iraqi Perseverance Cup to Iraqi Super Cup. The match was contested between the Baghdad rivals, Al-Zawraa and Al-Quwa Al-Jawiya, at Karbala International Stadium in Karbala. It was played on 17 November 2017 as a curtain-raiser to the 2017–18 season. Al-Quwa Al-Jawiya made their 5th appearance in the Super Cup while Al-Zawraa extended their record to 6 appearances. Al-Zawraa won the cup on penalties for the club's 4th title, a record.

Before the game, the Iraq Football Association decided that if the final was to finish as a draw after 90 minutes, the match would go straight to a penalty shootout, with no extra-time played. This turned out to be the case due to the last-minute Al-Zawraa equalising goal from Ali Rehema.

== Pre-match ==
Iraq international goalkeeper Wissam Gassid, who played for both clubs, had a retirement ceremony before kick-off.

== Match ==
=== Details ===
17 November 2017
18:00 UTC+03:00

Al-Quwa Al-Jawiya	1–1	Al-Zawraa
Mohsin 14'		Rehema 90+5'
Penalties
Mobayed (penalty missed); Ali Bari (penalty missed); Antić (penalty missed)	0–3	(penalty scored) Jwayed; (penalty scored) Sabah; (penalty scored) Mahmoud

Karbala International Stadium, Karbala
Attendance: 30,000
Referee: Mohanad Qasim

Al-Quwa Al-Jawiya	Al-Zawraa

GK	1	(Iraq) Fahad Talib
RB	6	(Iraq) Sameh Saeed
CB	36	(Croatia) Sebastijan Antić	(yellow card) 64'
CB	2	(Iraq) Samal Saeed
LB	33	(Iraq) Ali Bahjat	(yellow card) 67'
DM	40	(Syria) Khaled Mobayed	(yellow card) 60'
DM	18	(Syria) Zaher Midani
RW	29	(Iraq) Amjad Radhi		(substituted off) 54'
AM	9	(Iraq) Emad Mohsin	(yellow card) 16'	(substituted off) 81'
LW	7	(Iraq) Karrar Ali Bari
CF	10	(Iraq) Hammadi Ahmed (c)	(yellow card) 64'	(substituted off) 90+1'
Substitutions:
MF	8	(Iraq) Saif Salman		(substituted in) 54'
FW	14	(Iraq) Jawad Kadhim		(substituted in) 81'
MF	17	(Iraq) Ali Yousif		(substituted in) 90+1'
Manager:
(Syria) Hussam Al Sayed

GK	12	(Iraq) Jalal Hassan
RB	3	(Syria) Hussein Jwayed
CB	15	(Iraq) Ali Rehema
CB	29	(Iraq) Abbas Qasim	(yellow card) 74'
LB	32	(Syria) Nadim Sabagh	(yellow card) 90+3'
RM	10	(Iraq) Amjad Kalaf		(substituted off) 77'
CM	5	(Iraq) Safaa Hadi
CM	7	(Iraq) Ahmad Fadhel		(substituted off) 86'
LM	9	(Iraq) Hussein Ali
AM	8	(Iraq) Ibrahim Bayesh		(substituted off) 56'
CF	11	(Iraq) Luay Salah (c)	(yellow card) 67'
Substitutions:
MF	17	(Iraq) Ameer Sabah		(substituted in) 56'
FW	18	(Iraq) Mustafa Jawda		(substituted in) 77'
MF	16	(Iraq) Mustafa Mahmoud		(substituted in) 86'
Manager:
(Iraq) Ayoub Odisho

Match rules

- 90 minutes.
- Penalty shoot-out if scores still level.
- Seven named substitutes, of which up to three may be used.

Iraqi Super Cup
2017 winner
Al-Zawraa
4th title
