= Aboubakar Koné (footballer, born 1982) =

Ivorian footballer

Personal information
- Full name: Aboubakar Koné
- Date of birth: 1 January 1982 (age 44)
- Place of birth: Bouaké, Ivory Coast
- Height: 1.85 m (6 ft 1 in)
- Position: Striker

Team information
- Current team: Al-Hudood SC (Assist.)

Senior career*
Years	Team	Apps	(Gls)
2009–2010	El Entag El Harby		(4)
2010–2011	Zamalek	17	(1)
2011–2014	Tala'ea El Gaish		(3)
2013–2014	→ Al-Taliya (loan)		
2014	→ Al Kamil Al Wafi (loan)		
2015–2016	Al-Shabab		(8)
2016–2017	Al-Talaba		(13)
2017–	Al-Kahrabaa		(17)

Managerial career
- 2021–: Al-Hudood SC (Assist.)
- * Club domestic league appearances and goals as of 18 September 2019

Aboubakar Koné (born 1 January 1982) is an Ivorian professional footballer who plays as a striker for Iraqi Premier League club Al-Kahrabaa.
