= Thaer Krouma =

Syrian footballer (born 1990)

Personal information
- Full name: Thaer Sami Krouma
- Date of birth: 2 February 1990 (age 36)
- Place of birth: Homs, Syria
- Height: 1.87 m (6 ft 2 in)
- Positions: Centre-back; defensive midfielder

Team information
- Current team: Al-Hurriya SC
- Number: 31

Senior career*
Years	Team	Apps	(Gls)
2009–2012	Al-Wathba		
2012–2014	Al-Shorta		
2014–2015	Al-Wahda		
2015–2016	Al-Talaba		
2016–2017	Naft Al-Janoob		
2017	Al-Ittihad		
2018	Al-Ansar	9	(2)
2018–2019	Al-Suwaiq		
2019–2020	Al-Jaish		
2020–2021	Naft Al-Basra		
2021	Tishreen		
2021–2022	Al-Najma		
2022	Naft Al-Basra		
2022	Al-Fotuwa		
2022–2023	Al-Ain	16	(0)
2023	Al-Fotuwa		
2023	Tishreen		
2023–2024	Al-Fotuwa		
2024–2025	Mumbai City	31	(2)
2025–2026	Al-Karamah		

International career^{‡}
2010–2012	Syria U23		
2015–	Syria	46	(1)
- * Club domestic league appearances and goals ‡ National team caps and goals as of 19 November 2024

Thaer Sami Krouma (Arabic: ثائر كروما; born 2 February 1990) is a Syrian professional footballer who plays as a centre-back or defensive midfielder. He is also a member of the Syria national team.

== Club career ==
=== Early career ===
On 3 January 2018, Krouma moved to Lebanese Premier League side Ansar on a six-year contract.

On 21 August 2022, Krouma joined Saudi Arabian club Al-Ain.

=== Mumbai City FC ===
On 3 February 2023, following Krouma's successful 2023 AFC Asian Cup campaign with Syria, Indian Super League club Mumbai City announced that he was signing with the club on a short-term contract until the end of the 2023–24 season. His debut came from the start in a 0–1 away win over East Bengal, keeping a clean sheet alongside Tiri.

Krouma scored his debut goal with a late equalizer against Mohun Bagan in September 2024, saving a point for Mumbai as the game ended in 2-2 draw. On 30 November 2024, Krouma won the player of the match award following his performance at defensive midfield against Hyderabad FC in a 1-0 win at home.

On 26 January 2025, at home against Mohammedan SC, Krouma scored his second goal for the club with a shot from the edge of the box. This was the third goal in an eventual 3-0 win for Mumbai.

== International goals ==
No.	Date	Venue	Opponent	Score	Result	Competition
1.	12 September 2023	Phoenix Hill Football Stadium, Chengdu, China	China	1–0	1–0	Friendly
