= Al Naft Stadium =

Stadium in Baghdad, Iraq

- ملعب النفط (Arabic)
- Interactive map of Al Naft Stadium
- Location: Baghdad, Iraq
- Coordinates: 33°24′09.9″N 44°24′26.3″E
- Capacity: 3,000
- Surface: Grass
- Field size: 105 by 68 metres (114.8 yd × 74.4 yd)

Tenant
- Al-Naft SC

Al-Naft Stadium (Arabic: ملعب النفط) is a multi-use stadium located in Baghdad, Iraq. It is currently used mostly for football matches and serves as the home stadium of the Iraqi Premier League club Al Naft.

== See also ==
- List of football stadiums in Iraq
