= Al-Quwa Al-Jawiya Stadium =

Stadium in Iraq

Coordinates: 33°20′40″N 44°26′20″E

- ملعب القوة الجوية
- Interactive map of Al-Quwa Al-Jawiya Stadium
- Full name: Al-Quwa Al-Jawiya Stadium
- Location: Baghdad, Iraq
- Owner: Al-Quwa Al-Jawiya
- Capacity: 6,000 (original standing capacity was 10,000 prior to being made all-seated in 2012)
- Surface: Grass

Construction
- Renovated: 2003–2004
- Expanded: 2005
- Closed: 2025
- Demolished: 2025

Tenant
- Al-Quwa Al-Jawiya

Al-Quwa Al-Jawiya Stadium (Arabic: ملعب القوة الجوية) was a multi-use all-seater stadium in Baghdad, Iraq. It was used mostly for football matches and was the home stadium of football club Al-Quwa Al-Jawiya. The stadium held 6,000 people. The stadium was demolished in July 2025 to make way for the construction of a new 15,000-seater stadium for the club.

== See also ==
- List of football stadiums in Iraq
