= As Samawah Stadium =

Stadium in Samawah, Iraq

Coordinates: 31°19′59″N 45°17′20″E

As Samawah Stadium is a multi-use stadium in Samawah, Iraq. It is currently used mostly for football matches and serves as the home stadium of Samawa FC. The stadium holds 15,000 people.

== See also ==
- List of football stadiums in Iraq
