= An-Najaf Stadium =

Stadium in Najaf, Iraq

Al-Najaf old stadium
- ملعب النجف القديم
- ملعب الادارة المحلية في النجف
- Interactive map of Al-Najaf old stadium
- Location: Najaf, Iraq
- Coordinates: 32°00′43.6″N 44°19′39.9″E
- Owner: Al-Najaf SC
- Capacity: 12,000
- Surface: Grass
- Field size: 105 by 68 metres (114.8 yd × 74.4 yd)

Construction
- Opened: 1970

Tenant
- Al-Najaf SC

An-Najaf Stadium (Arabic: ستاد النجف) is a multi-use stadium located in Najaf, Iraq. It is currently used mostly for football matches and serves as the home stadium of Al-Najaf SC. Opened in 1970, the stadium holds 12,000 people.

== See also ==
- List of football stadiums in Iraq
