= Al-Samawa SC =

Iraqi football club

Al Samawa
- Full name: Al Samawa Sports Club
- Founded: 1963; 63 years ago
- Ground: As Samawah Stadium
- Capacity: 15,000
- Chairman: Namir Hasoon
- Manager: Falah Hadi Hussein
- League: Iraqi First Division League
- 2025–26: Iraqi First Division League, 17th of 20
Home colours	Away colours

Al-Samawa SC (Arabic: نادي السماوة) is an Iraqi sports club based in As-Samawa, Al-Muthanna, that competes in the Iraqi First Division League, the third tier of Iraqi football. The club's home stadium is As Samawah Stadium.

== History ==
Al-Samawa Sports Club was founded in 1963 by Shamkhi Jabr Athab, the first president of the club was Hatem Rashid Deibes. In 1974 the team played in the Iraqi Premier League since the beginning of the league, they won sixth place. In the end of next season 1975–76 they came in last place and relegated to Iraqi First Division League. The club returned to play in the Premier League again in the 1999–2000 season, and continued for seven seasons until they relegated to First Division League in the 2005–06 season. The club returned after a year to qualification for the Premier League again since the 2007–08 season, and after three seasons relegated to First Division League in the 2009–10 season, but returned to play in the Premier League in 2015–16 season where qualified after winning the Iraqi First Division championship for 2014–15 season.

== Managerial history ==
Since winning the Iraqi First Division League and returning to play in the Premier League in the 2015 season so far, the team has led twelve coaches.

- (Iraq) Abdallah Alzayadi (February 2016-August 2016)
- (Iraq) Ali Wahab (May 2015–June 2015)
- (Egypt) Mohammed Alosh (2015–2016)
- (Iraq) Khalid Aoda (Sep 2016–Nov 2016)
- (Iraq) Hassan Kamal (Nov 2016–Dec 216)
- (Iraq) Sabah Abdul Hassan (2016–2017)
- (Iraq) Aqeel Ghani (Jan 2017–Fab 2017)
- (Iraq) Muneer Jaber (Fab 2017–Apr 2017)
- (Iraq) Hazim Saleh (2017–2018)
- (Iraq) Safaa Adnan (2018–2019)
- (Iraq) Ghalib Abdul Hussein (Jan 2019–Mar 2019)
- (Iraq) Maitham Dael-Haq (Mar 2019–June 2019)
- (Iraq) Samir Kadhim (June 2019–2020)
- (Iraq) Ghalib Abdul Hussein (2020)
- (Iraq) Aqeel Ghani (2020)
- (Iraq) Shaker Mahmoud (2020–2021)
- (Iraq) Samir Kadhim (2021)
- (Iraq) Aqeel Ghani (2021–2022)
- (Iraq) Haider Hussien (2022)
- (Iraq) Ali Jawad (2022–2023)
- (Iraq) Falah Hadi Hussein

== Honours ==
- Iraqi Premier Division League (second tier)
  - Winners (1): 2014–15
