= Al-Kahrabaa SC =

Iraqi football club

Al-Kahraba'a
- Full name: Al-Kahraba'a Sports Club
- Founded: July 21, 2001; 25 years ago
- Ground: Al-Kahraba'a Stadium
- Capacity: 2,000
- Chairman: Ali Jabbar Al-Asadi
- Manager: Wali Karim
- League: Iraq Stars League
- 2025–26: Iraq Stars League, 17th of 20
Home colours	Away colours

Al-Kahraba'a Sports Club (Arabic: نادي الكهرباء الرياضي, lit. 'Electricity Sports Club') is an Iraqi professional sports club based in Rusafa District, Baghdad, and is known for its football team that competes in the Iraq Stars League.

== History ==
Al-Kahraba'a Sports Club was founded on 21 July 2001 by Saad Abdul Hamed Al-Khatib (who was the first ever chairman) in the Ministry of Electricity. They were promoted to the Iraqi Premier League for the first time for the 2004–05 season where they remained until they got relegated to the Iraqi First Division League in 2013. They were promoted back to the Premier League at the first attempt under coach Shaker Mahmoud, where they have remained since. During the 2017–18 season, Al-Kahraba'a finished fifth, their best league position in history, which they later equalled in the 2022–23 season.

Al-Kahraba'a reached the final of the 2018–19 Iraq FA Cup for the first time in their history after beating Al-Talaba 3–0 in the semi-finals, but lost the final against Iraqi giants Al-Zawraa 1–0 at the national Al-Shaab Stadium. Al-Kahraba'a reached the final of the Iraq FA Cup again in the 2021–22 season, but were beaten 2–1 by Al-Karkh.

=== AFC Cup debut ===
Al-Kahraba'a finished the 2022–23 Iraqi Premier League in fifth place but since they have the license for the competition, they qualified for their first ever 2023–24 AFC Cup debut.

== Current squad ==
=== First-team squad ===
As of 16 September 2026

Note: Flags indicate national team as defined under FIFA eligibility rules; some limited exceptions apply. Players may hold more than one non-FIFA nationality.

No.	Pos.	Nation	Player
1	GK	IRQ	Ahmed Khudhair
2	DF	IRQ	Hussein Naaim
3	DF	IRQ	Sajjad Khalil
4	DF	TUN	Thameur Salhi
5	DF	IRQ	Abbas Adnan Al-Mohammed
7	FW	IRQ	Hussein Najm
8	FW	IRQ	Mohannad Abdul-Raheem
9	FW	BRA	Diego Carioca
10	FW	IRQ	Ahmed Ayyed
11	FW	BRA	Lucas Esquerdinha
12	GK	IRQ	Amjad Rahim
15	DF	SEN	Mélo Ndiaye

No.	Pos.	Nation	Player
17	MF	IRQ	Mustafa Salah
18	MF	IRQ	Ali Mahdi
22	GK	IRQ	Mohammed Ahmed
25	MF	IRQ	Abbas Majid
27	DF	IRQ	Hamid Ali
34	MF	IRQ	Abdullah Abdul-Amir
36	DF	IRQ	Adham Qais
44	MF	TUN	Khemais Maaouani
45	MF	GHA	Reuben Acquah
69	DF	IRQ	Abbas Qasim
79	MF	IRQ	Ameer Ayad
99	FW	GHA	Samuel Kumi

=== Out on loan ===
Note: Flags indicate national team as defined under FIFA eligibility rules; some limited exceptions apply. Players may hold more than one non-FIFA nationality.

No.	Pos.	Nation	Player
—	MF	IRQ	Ali Jasim (on loan at Al-Quwa Al-Jawiya until the end of the 2023–24 season)

== Managerial history ==
Since the club’s promotion to the Iraqi Premier League for the first time in 2004–05 fifteen coaches have led the team:

- (Iraq) Nabil Zaki (2001–2006)
- (Iraq) Adil Abdul-Ridha (2006)
- (Iraq) Nazar Ashraf (2006)
- (Iraq) Younis Abid Ali (2006–2007)
- (Iraq) Rajah Mohammed (2007)
- (Iraq) Bassim Mohammed (2007)
- (Iraq) Nabil Zaki (2007)
- (Iraq) Shaker Mahmoud (2007–2008)
- (Iraq) Naeem Saddam (2008)
- (Iraq) Sabah Abdul Hassan (2008)
- (Iraq) Karim Farhan (2008)
- (Iraq) Shaker Mahmoud (2009–2011)
- (Iraq) Hassan Ahmed (2011–2013)
- (Iraq) Nabil Zaki (2013–2014)
- (Iraq) Shaker Mahmoud (2014–2015)
- (Iraq) Ali Hadi (2013–2014)
- (Iraq) Khalid Mohammed Sabbar (2016)
- (Iraq) Younis Al Qattan (2016)
- (Iraq) Abbas Attiya (2016–2018)
- (Iraq) Khalid Mohammed Sabbar (2018)
- (Iraq) Abbas Attiya (2018–2021)
- (Iraq) Ahmed Salah Alwan (2021)
- (Iraq) Luay Salah (2021–present)

== Honours ==
- Iraq FA Cup
  - Runners-up (2): 2018–19, 2021–22

== Other sports ==
=== Basketball ===
- Iraqi Basketball Premier League:
  - Champions (2): 2005–06, 2012–13
