= Al-Naft SC =

Iraqi football club

Al Naft Sport Club
- Full name: Al-Naft Sports Club
- Founded: 1979; 47 years ago
- Ground: Al Naft Stadium
- Capacity: 3,000
- Chairman: Moatasem Akram Hassan
- Manager: Adel Nima
- League: Iraq Stars League
- 2025–26: Iraq Stars League, 11th of 20
Home colours	Away colours

Al Naft Sports Club (Arabic: نادي النفط الرياضي, lit. 'Oil Sports Club') is an Iraqi professional sports club based in the Adhamiyah District, East Districts of the Tigris River, Baghdad. Their football team plays in the highest division in Iraq which is the Iraq Stars League, which they have never been relegated from.

== History ==
Al-Naft Sports Club was established in 1979 by the Ministry of Oil, and was officially registered in the Ministry of Youth and Sports in 1982. In the 1985 season the team played in the Iraqi Premier League for the first time, and finished in the penultimate position that season, and have remained in the Premier League since then. The club's football team were runners-up of the Al-Nasr wal-Salam Cup in 1996, the Durand Cup in 1996, the Baghdad Championship in 1998, and the Iraqi Premier League in 2017, and qualified to play in the Arab Club Champions Cup. In the 2018–19 Arab Club Champions Cup, Al-Naft managed to overcome the Tunisian club: CS Sfaxien and expelled it from the championship and qualify for the round 16, but then lost to the Saudi club: Al-Hilal, and left the tournament.

== Honours ==
=== Domestic ===
- Iraq Stars League
  - Runners-up (1): 2016–17
- Baghdad Championship
  - Runners-up (1): 1998–99

=== Continental ===
- Arab Club Champions Cup: 1 appearance
  - Second Round: 2018–19

=== Invitational ===
- Durand Cup
  - Runners-up (1): 1996

== Current squad ==
=== First-team squad ===
As of 16 September 2026

Note: Flags indicate national team as defined under FIFA eligibility rules; some limited exceptions apply. Players may hold more than one non-FIFA nationality.

No.	Pos.	Nation	Player
1	GK	IRQ	Waleed Attiya
2	DF	NGR	Samson Dare
3	DF	IRQ	Saif Kareem Abd-Ridha
4	DF	IRQ	Omar Laith
6	DF	IRQ	Diyar Yakhy
7	FW	IRQ	Husam Jadallah Khalaf
8	MF	IRQ	Hussam Malek
10	FW	BRA	Caíque
11	FW	IRQ	Haider Al-Rahim
12	DF	IRQ	Karrar Salim
13	FW	IRQ	Aws Firas
15	MF	IRQ	Haidar Jasib
16	MF	IRQ	Ali Majid
17	DF	GHA	Habib Mohammed

No.	Pos.	Nation	Player
20	GK	IRQ	Hayder Jamal
25	MF	IRQ	Sattar Yassin
26	DF	IRQ	Fadhel Kareem
27	FW	IRQ	Waleed Kareem
31	GK	IRQ	Ali Yaseen
32	FW	GHA	Collins Opare
34	MF	IRQ	Karrar Razzak
35	DF	IRQ	Ahmed Khaled
55	DF	IRQ	Hussein Ghafar
66	MF	CGO	Christ Kouvouama
77	MF	BFA	Sami Hien
94	FW	BRA	Walmerson
99	FW	IRQ	Mohammed Adnan

=== Out on loan ===
Note: Flags indicate national team as defined under FIFA eligibility rules; some limited exceptions apply. Players may hold more than one non-FIFA nationality.

No.	Pos.	Nation	Player

== Personnel ==
=== Current technical staff ===
Position	Name	Nationality
Manager:	Adel Nima	(Iraq)
Assistant manager:	Mohammed Jasim	(Iraq)
Goalkeeping coach:	Ghanim Ibrahim	(Iraq)
Fitness coach:	Nasir Abdul-Ameer	(Iraq)
Director of football:	Mushtak Kadhim	(Iraq)
U-19 Manager:	Salam Touma	(Iraq)

Updated to match played 23 September 2021
Source: kooora.com

=== Board members ===
Position	Name	Nationality
President:	Moatasem Akram Hassan	(Iraq)
Vice-president:	Kadhim Mohammed Sultan	(Iraq)
Member of the Board:	Falah Abdul Zahra	(Iraq)
Member of the Board:	Mohammad Jaber Hassan	(Iraq)
Member of the Board:	Jalil Farhan	(Iraq)
Member of the Board:	Shaker Abboud	(Iraq)
Member of the Board:	Adel Hussein	(Iraq)
Member of the Board:	Falah Khashan	(Iraq)
Member of the Board:	Rana Abdul Rahman	(Iraq)

Updated to match played 5 April 2012
Source: Ninanews.com

== Kit suppliers ==
Period	Kit manufacturer
2020–	Joma

== Managerial history ==
Since the club's promotion to the Iraqi Premier League in the 1985–86 season so far, twenty six coaches have led the team:

- (Iraq) Fakhri Mohammed Salman (1979–1983)
- (Iraq) Dhargham Mahdi Al-Haidari (1983–1984)
- (Iraq) Khalaf Hassan (1984–1985)
- (Iraq) Kadhim Al-Rubaie (1985–1986)
- (Iraq) Wathiq Naji (1986–1989)
- (Iraq) Anwar Jassam (1988–1989)
- (Iraq) Jamal Salih (1989–1990)
- (Iraq) Anwar Jassam (1991–1992)
- (Iraq) Mejbel Fartous (1992–1994)
- (Iraq) Amer Jameel (1994–1995)
- (Iraq) Abdelilah Abdul-Hameed (1995–1997)
- (Iraq) Nadhim Shaker (1997)
- (Iraq) Amer Jameel (1997–1998)
- (Iraq) Razzak Khazal (1998)
- (Iraq) Mohammed Ali Al-Sheikhli (1998–1999)
- (Iraq) Maad Ibrahim (1999–2001)
- (Iraq) Hamed Salman (2001–2002)
- (Iraq) Mohammed Tabra (2002)
- (Iraq) Ali Hussein Yassin (2002)
- (Iraq) Abdelilah Abdul-Hameed (2002–2003)
- (Iraq) Wathiq Aswad (2003)
- (Iraq) Jabar Hamed (2003–2004)
- (Iraq) Mohammed Ali Al-Sheikhli (2004)
- (Iraq) Hamed Salman (2004–2005)
- (Iraq) Salam Hashim (2005)
- (Iraq) Hamed Salman (2005–2007)
- (Iraq) Mohammed Ali Al-Sheikhli (2007)
- (Iraq) Mohammed Jassim (2007)
- (Iraq) Younis Abid Ali (2007–2008)
- (Iraq) Sabah Abdul-Jalil (2008–2009)
- (Iraq) Hamed Salman (2009–2010)
- (Iraq) Sabah Abdul-Jalil (2010–2011)
- (Iraq) Ali Wahab (2011)
- (Iraq) Sabah Abdul-Jalil (2011–2012)
- (Iraq) Nadhim Shaker (2012)
- (Iraq) Shaker Mahmoud (2012–2013)
- (Iraq) Jamal Ali (2013)
- (Iraq) Basim Qasim (2013–2014)
- (Iraq) Sabah Abdul-Jalil (2014)
- (Iraq) Thair Jassam (2014–2015)
- (Iraq) Hassan Ahmed (2015–2019)
- (Iraq) Basim Qasim (2019–2019)
- (Iraq) Yahya Alwan (2019–2021)
- (Iraq) Basim Qasim (2021–present)
