= 2018–19 Al-Shorta SC season =

Al-Shorta
2018–19 season
- President: (Iraq) Abdul-Wahab Al-Taei
- Manager: (Montenegro) Nebojša Jovović (until 19 July) (Iraq) Ahmed Salah (Caretaker) (from 20 July onwards)
- Ground: Al-Shaab Stadium
- Iraqi Premier League: 1st
- Iraq FA Cup: Round of 16
- Top goalscorer: League: Alaa Abdul-Zahra (28); All: Alaa Abdul-Zahra (29)
Home colours	Away colours

The 2018–19 season was Al-Shorta's 45th season in the Iraqi Premier League, having featured in all 44 previous editions of the competition. Al-Shorta participated in the Iraqi Premier League and the Iraq FA Cup.

They entered this season having finished fourth in the league in the 2017–18 season, but under the management of Nebojša Jovović they achieved better results and managed to secure the Iraqi Premier League title on 14 July with two full rounds to spare. They finished five points above closest challenger Al-Quwa Al-Jawiya, thus qualifying for both the 2020 AFC Champions League and 2019–20 Arab Club Champions Cup. In the Iraq FA Cup, Al-Shorta were eliminated in the Round of 16 against Al-Kahrabaa.

== Player statistics ==
Numbers in parentheses denote appearances as substitute.

No.	Pos.	Nat.	Name	Premier League		FA Cup		Total	
No.	Pos.	Nat.	Name	Apps	Goals	Apps	Goals	Apps	Goals
1	GK	IRQ	Ahmed Basil	1	0	1	0	2	0
2	DF	IRQ	Karrar Mohammed	27(1)	0	4	1	31(1)	1
4	DF	IRQ	Mustafa Nadhim	4(6)	0	0	0	4(6)	0
5	MF	IRQ	Hussein Abdul-Wahed (captain)	2(14)	0	4	0	6(14)	0
6	MF	NGA	Maarouf Youssef	28(2)	3	2	0	30(2)	3
8	MF	IRQ	Karrar Jassim	18(6)	2	0	0	18(6)	2
9	MF	IRQ	Mahdi Kamel	18(10)	1	2	0	20(10)	1
10	FW	IRQ	Alaa Abdul-Zahra	36	28	2(2)	1	38(2)	29
11	DF	IRQ	Dhurgham Ismail (vice-captain)	11(6)	0	0(1)	0	11(7)	0
12	FW	IRQ	Ammar Abdul-Hussein	14(17)	2	4	0	18(17)	2
13	MF	IRQ	Amjad Waleed	13(17)	0	3(1)	0	16(18)	0
15	DF	TUN	Ziad Al-Derbali	13(5)	0	0	0	13(5)	0
16	FW	IRQ	Mustafa Mohammed Salih	0(3)	0	0	0	0(3)	0
17	DF	IRQ	Alaa Mhawi	22(7)	2	1	0	23(7)	2
18	FW	IRQ	Mohanad Ali	29(1)	19	0(1)	1	29(2)	20
19	MF	IRQ	Amjad Attwan	33	2	0	0	33	2
20	GK	IRQ	Mohammed Hameed	36	0	0	0	36	0
21	GK	IRQ	Mohammed Abbas	1	0	3	0	4	0
22	DF	IRQ	Hussam Kadhim	19(5)	1	4	0	23(5)	1
23	DF	IRQ	Waleed Salem	18(5)	0	0	0	18(5)	0
24	DF	IRQ	Faisal Jassim	33	0	3	0	36	0
25	MF	IRQ	Saad Abdul-Amir	14(4)	1	2	0	16(4)	1
26	MF	IRQ	Hassan Abdul-Karim	1(6)	0	1(2)	0	2(8)	0
27	MF	IRQ	Haidar Abdul-Salam	0(2)	0	1(2)	0	1(4)	0
28	MF	IRQ	Atheer Salih	0(1)	0	0	0	0(1)	0
29	DF	IRQ	Bilal Khudhair	0	0	0	0	0	0
33	FW	SEN	Alassane Diallo	26(7)	11	2	4	28(7)	15
Players out on loan for rest of the season
3	DF	IRQ	Ahmed Nadhim	0(4)	0	1(1)	0	1(5)	0
28	FW	IRQ	Mustafa Farman	0	0	0(1)	0	0(1)	0
	GK	IRQ	Abdul-Aziz Ammar	0	0	0	0	0	0
	MF	IRQ	Moamel Kareem	0	0	0	0	0	0
	MF	IRQ	Mohammed Mohsen	0	0	0	0	0	0
Players departed but featured this season
7	FW	IRQ	Mohammed Jabbar Shokan	0(5)	0	3(1)	0	3(6)	0
14	FW	CMR	Dominique Mendy	1(2)	0	1	0	2(2)	0
29	DF	IRQ	Ahmed Thaer	0	0	0(1)	0	0(1)	0

== Personnel ==
=== Technical Staff ===
Position	Name	Nationality
Manager:	Nebojša Jovović	(Montenegro)
Assistant manager:	Haitham Al-Shboul	(Jordan)
Assistant manager:	Ahmed Salah	(Iraq)
Fitness coach:	Marko Jovanović	(Montenegro)
Goalkeeping coach:	Zoran Banović	(Montenegro)
Medical officer:	Haider Abdul-Zahra	(Iraq)
Director of football:	Hashim Ridha	(Iraq)
Administrator:	Bilal Hussein	(Iraq)

=== Management ===
Position	Name	Nationality
President:	Abdul-Wahab Al-Taei	(Iraq)
Honorary President:	Yaseen Al-Yasiri	(Iraq)
Financial Secretary:	Uday Tariq	(Iraq)
Board Secretary	Alaa Bahar Al-Uloom	(Iraq)
Member of the Board:	Sadiq Jafar	(Iraq)
Member of the Board:	Ghazi Faisal	(Iraq)
Member of the Board:	Tahseen Al-Yassri	(Iraq)
Member of the Board:	Ali Al-Shahmani	(Iraq)
Member of the Board:	Ghalib Al-Zamili	(Iraq)
Member of the Board:	Ahsan Al-Daraji	(Iraq)

== Kit ==
Period	Home colours	Away colours	Supplier
September 2018 – November 2018			Nike
November 2018 – May 2019, May 2019 – July 2019			Nike
May 2019			Nike

== Transfers ==
=== In ===
Date	Pos.	Name	From	Fee
July 2018	DF	(Iraq) Mustafa Nadhim	(Iraq) Al-Najaf	-
July 2018	FW	(Iraq) Mohammed Jabbar Shokan	(Jordan) Al-Ramtha	-
July 2018	DF	(Iraq) Ahmed Nadhim	(Iraq) Al-Talaba	-
July 2018	MF	(Iraq) Amjad Attwan	(Iraq) Al-Najaf	-
August 2018	MF	(Iraq) Saad Abdul-Amir	(Saudi Arabia) Al-Shabab	-
August 2018	FW	(Senegal) Alassane Diallo	(United Arab Emirates) Dibba Al-Fujairah	-
August 2018	DF	(Brazil) Carlos Santos	Free agent	-
September 2018	DF	(France) Mamadou Wagué	(Ukraine) Chornomorets Odesa	-
September 2018	MF	(Nigeria) Maarouf Youssef	(Egypt) Al-Zamalek	Loan
January 2019	DF	(Iraq) Dhurgham Ismail	(Turkey) Çaykur Rizespor	-
January 2019	MF	(Senegal) Dominique Mendy	(Iraq) Al-Quwa Al-Jawiya	-
January 2019	MF	(Iraq) Karrar Jassim	(Iran) Sanat Naft Abadan	-
January 2019	DF	(Tunisia) Ziad Al-Derbali	(Bahrain) Al-Muharraq	-

=== Out ===
Date	Pos.	Name	To	Fee
July 2018	MF	(Ghana) Asiedu Attobrah		Released
July 2018	MF	(Ghana) Akwetey Mensah	(Iraq) Al-Sinaat Al-Kahrabaiya	-
July 2018	FW	(Brazil) Jefferson Araújo	(Brazil) Manaus	-
July 2018	FW	(Iraq) Rafid Muayad	(Iraq) Al-Karkh	-
July 2018	FW	(Iraq) Aqeel Khairi	(Iraq) Al-Sinaat Al-Kahrabaiya	-
July 2018	FW	(Iraq) Karrar Hameed	(Iraq) Al-Hudood	-
August 2018	DF	(Iraq) Ali Lateef	(Iraq) Al-Talaba	-
August 2018	MF	(Iraq) Nabeel Sabah	(Iraq) Al-Talaba	-
August 2018	DF	(Iraq) Ahmed Mohammed	(Iraq) Al-Talaba	-
August 2018	FW	(Iraq) Abdul-Qadir Tariq	(Iraq) Al-Talaba	-
August 2018	MF	(Iraq) Mohammed Mohsen	(Iraq) Amanat Baghdad	Loan
August 2018	GK	(Iraq) Neriman Khedher	(Iraq) Al-Sinaat Al-Kahrabaiya	-
August 2018	MF	(Iraq) Ahmad Ayad		Released
September 2018	DF	(Brazil) Carlos Santos		Released
September 2018	DF	(France) Mamadou Wagué		Released
December 2018	GK	(Iraq) Abdul-Aziz Ammar	(Iraq) Al-Samawa	Loan
January 2019	FW	(Iraq) Mohammed Jabbar Shokan	(Iraq) Al-Minaa	-
January 2019	DF	(Iraq) Ahmed Nadhim	(Iraq) Al-Naft	Loan
January 2019	FW	(Iraq) Mustafa Farman	(Iraq) Al-Sinaa	Loan
July 2019	MF	(Nigeria) Maarouf Youssef	(Egypt) Al-Zamalek	End of loan
July 2019	FW	(Iraq) Mohanad Ali	(Qatar) Al-Duhail	$1,800,000

== Competitions ==
=== Iraqi Premier League ===
15 September 2018 1	Al-Shorta	2 – 0	Naft Al-Wasat	Baghdad
15:00 GMT	Mahdi Kamel 62'; Alassane Diallo 69'		Salih Sadir (penalty missed) 89'	Stadium: Al-Shaab Stadium; Referee: Mohanad Qassim

23 September 2018 2	Al-Zawraa	0 – 0	Al-Shorta	Baghdad
15:00 GMT				Stadium: Al-Shaab Stadium; Referee: Ali Sabah

5 October 2018 3	Al-Shorta	0 – 0	Al-Talaba	Baghdad
14:45 GMT				Stadium: Al-Shaab Stadium; Referee: Mohanad Qassim

21 October 2018 4	Naft Al-Junoob	1 – 3	Al-Shorta	Basra
14:15 GMT	Faisal Kadhem 31'		Alaa Abdul-Zahra 1', 88'; Mohanad Ali 48'	Stadium: Al-Fayhaa Stadium; Referee: Watheq Muhammed

2 November 2018 5	Al-Shorta	3 – 0	Al-Sinaat Al-Kahrabaiya	Baghdad
13:45 GMT	Mohanad Ali 20', 90+4'; Amjad Attwan 27'			Stadium: Al-Shaab Stadium; Referee: Mohamed Salman

7 November 2018 6	Al-Kahrabaa	0 – 2	Al-Shorta	Baghdad
11:30 GMT			Mohanad Ali 25'; Hassan Ashour 48' (o.g.)	Stadium: Al-Taji Stadium; Referee: Yousif Saeed Hasan

24 November 2018 7	Al-Shorta	5 – 1	Naft Maysan	Baghdad
11:30 GMT	Mohanad Ali 30', 72'; Alassane Diallo 48'; Alaa Mhawi 78'; Alaa Abdul-Zahra 87'		Mustafa Hussein Mohammad 16'	Stadium: Amanat Baghdad Stadium; Referee: Fareed Kareem

29 November 2018 8	Al-Quwa Al-Jawiya	1 – 1	Al-Shorta	Baghdad
15:00 GMT	Emad Mohsin 45+1'		Alassane Diallo 14'	Stadium: Al-Shaab Stadium; Referee: Watheq Muhammed

3 December 2018 9	Al-Shorta	2 – 0	Al-Hussein	Baghdad
13:15 GMT	Alaa Abdul-Zahra 30' (pen.); Alassane Diallo 32'			Stadium: Al-Shaab Stadium; Referee: Mohanad Qassim

7 December 2018 10	Al-Diwaniya	1 – 7	Al-Shorta	Diwaniya
11:00 GMT	Saif Taher 5'		Alassane Diallo 6', 60', 67'; Alaa Abdul-Zahra 25', 85', 90+2', (penalty missed) 78'; Ammar Abdul-Hussein 63'	Stadium: Al-Diwaniya Stadium; Referee: Ali Sabah

12 December 2018 11	Erbil	0 – 1	Al-Shorta	Erbil
12:00 GMT			Maarouf Youssef 52'	Stadium: Franso Hariri Stadium; Referee: Yousif Saeed Hasan

16 December 2018 12	Al-Shorta	1 – 0	Al-Hudood	Baghdad
13:15 GMT	Alaa Abdul-Zahra 71'		Saif Jassim (yellow card) 55' (yellow-red card) 63'	Stadium: Al-Shaab Stadium; Referee: Zaid Thamer Mohammed

31 January 2019 13	Al-Samawa	0 – 4	Al-Shorta	Samawa
11:30 GMT			Alaa Abdul-Zahra 42', 52'; Alassane Diallo 55'; Mohanad Ali 90+2'	Stadium: Al-Samawa Stadium

5 February 2019 14	Amanat Baghdad	1 – 2	Al-Shorta	Baghdad
11:30 GMT	Muhammed Salam Anad 78'; Ayman Rzaiej (red card) 85'		Mohanad Ali 47'; Alaa Abdul-Zahra 71'	Stadium: Amanat Baghdad Stadium; Referee: Ali Sabah

10 February 2019 15	Al-Shorta	1 – 1	Al-Najaf	Baghdad
13:45 GMT	Maarouf Youssef 63'		Hussain Salman 26'	Stadium: Al-Shaab Stadium; Referee: Tahseen Ali

16 February 2019 16	Al-Shorta	3 – 0	Al-Minaa	Baghdad
15:00 GMT	Karrar Jassim 19'; Alaa Abdul-Zahra 38', 60'			Stadium: Al-Shaab Stadium; Referee: Mohamed Salman

21 February 2019 17	Al-Karkh	0 – 0	Al-Shorta	Baghdad
11:30 GMT				Stadium: Al-Karkh Stadium; Referee: Ali Sabah

25 February 2019 18	Al-Shorta	3 – 1	Al-Bahri	Baghdad
13:45 GMT	Mohanad Ali 21', 47'; Karrar Jassim 84'		Ahmed Dawood 25'	Stadium: Al-Shaab Stadium; Referee: Mohanad Qassim

4 March 2019 19	Al-Shorta	2 – 0	Al-Naft	Baghdad
13:45 GMT	Alaa Abdul-Zahra 11'; Mohanad Ali 39'			Stadium: Al-Shaab Stadium; Referee: Watheq Muhammed

30 March 2019 20	Naft Al-Wasat	0 – 1	Al-Shorta	Najaf
12:00 GMT			Mohanad Ali 52'	Stadium: Al-Najaf International Stadium; Referee: Zaid Thamer Mohammed

4 April 2019 21	Al-Shorta	0 – 0	Al-Zawraa	Baghdad
14:00 GMT				Stadium: Al-Shaab Stadium; Referee: Watheq Muhammed

11 April 2019 22	Al-Naft	0 – 1	Al-Shorta	Baghdad
12:30 GMT	Mazin Fayyadh (penalty missed) 85'		Mohanad Ali 40'	Stadium: Al-Sinaa Stadium; Referee: Yousif Saeed Hasan

18 April 2019 23	Al-Talaba	0 – 2	Al-Shorta	Baghdad
14:45 GMT			Alaa Abdul-Zahra 47' (pen.); Mohanad Ali 73'	Stadium: Al-Shaab Stadium; Referee: Zaid Thamer Mohammed

25 April 2019 24	Al-Shorta	4 – 0	Naft Al-Junoob	Baghdad
13:00 GMT	Mohanad Ali 28', 58'; Alaa Abdul-Zahra 43', 90+1'			Stadium: Al-Shaab Stadium; Referee: Fareed Kareem

2 May 2019 25	Al-Sinaat Al-Kahrabaiya	0 – 1	Al-Shorta	Baghdad
13:00 GMT			Alaa Mhawi 26'	Stadium: Al-Taji Stadium; Referee: Watheq Muhammed

10 May 2019 26	Al-Shorta	5 – 3	Al-Kahrabaa	Baghdad
19:00 GMT	Alassane Diallo 26', 65' (pen.); Alaa Abdul-Zahra 28', 37' (pen.), 76' (pen.); Alaa Mhawi (yellow card) (yellow-red card) 87'		Sajjad Raad 24', 80' (pen.); Murtadha Hudaib 71'	Stadium: Al-Shaab Stadium; Referee: Yousif Saeed Hasan

16 May 2019 27	Naft Maysan	1 – 1	Al-Shorta	Amara
19:00 GMT	Mehdi Daghagheleh 12'		Alaa Abdul-Zahra 45+1' (pen.)	Stadium: Maysan Olympic Stadium; Referee: Mohanad Qassim

23 May 2019 28	Al-Shorta	2 – 3	Al-Quwa Al-Jawiya	Baghdad
19:00 GMT	Alaa Abdul-Zahra 35', 52'		Hammadi Ahmad 13', 22', 80'	Stadium: Al-Shaab Stadium; Referee: Watheq Muhammed

28 May 2019 29	Al-Hussein	0 – 2	Al-Shorta	Baghdad
13:30 GMT			Alaa Abdul-Zahra 60'; Mohanad Ali 70'	Stadium: Five Thousand Stadium; Referee: Salem Amer

1 June 2019 30	Al-Shorta	1 – 0	Al-Diwaniya	Baghdad
19:00 GMT	Alaa Abdul-Zahra 10' (pen.)			Stadium: Al-Shaab Stadium; Referee: Ayad Mozahem

14 June 2019 31	Al-Shorta	2 – 1	Erbil	Baghdad
16:15 GMT	Alaa Abdul-Zahra 12'; Mohanad Ali 34'		Aso Rostam 73'	Stadium: Al-Shaab Stadium; Referee: Mohamed Salman

20 June 2019 32	Al-Hudood	1 – 2	Al-Shorta	Baghdad
14:00 GMT	Abdul-Abbas Ayad 38'; Fadhel Muqdad (penalty missed) 64'		Alaa Abdul-Zahra 21' (pen.); Alassane Diallo 53' (pen.)	Stadium: Al-Taji Stadium; Referee: Yousif Saeed Hasan

26 June 2019 33	Al-Shorta	3 – 1	Al-Samawa	Baghdad
15:00 GMT	Mohanad Ali 16'; Saad Abdul-Amir 34'; Alaa Abdul-Zahra 40' (pen.)		Haider Subhi (red card) 38'; Anes Malek 90+3'	Stadium: Al-Shaab Stadium; Referee: Ahmed Kadhim

2 July 2019 34	Al-Shorta	2 – 1	Amanat Baghdad	Baghdad
15:00 GMT	Maarouf Youssef 56'; Amjad Attwan 82'		Sattar Yasin 20'	Stadium: Al-Shaab Stadium; Referee: Mohanad Qassim

9 July 2019 35	Al-Najaf	0 – 0	Al-Shorta	Najaf
14:00 GMT				Stadium: Al-Najaf International Stadium; Referee: Zaid Thamer Mohammed

14 July 2019 36	Al-Minaa	1 – 0	Al-Shorta	Basra
16:15 GMT	Hussein Abdul-Wahid Khalaf 24'			Stadium: Al-Fayhaa Stadium; Referee: Watheq Muhammed

19 July 2019 37	Al-Shorta	1 – 0	Al-Karkh	Baghdad
15:00 GMT	Hussam Kadhim 10'			Stadium: Al-Shaab Stadium

23 July 2019 38	Al-Bahri	3 – 1	Al-Shorta	Basra
14:00 GMT	Ahmed Dawood 11'; Amer Mithaa 58'; Wael Abdul-Hussein 66' (pen.)		Ammar Abdul-Hussein 5'	Stadium: Al-Fayhaa Stadium

==== Score overview ====
Win Draw Loss

Opposition	Home score	Away score	Double
Al-Bahri	3–1	1–3	No
Al-Diwaniya	1–0	7–1	Yes
Al-Hudood	1–0	2–1	Yes
Al-Hussein	2–0	2–0	Yes
Al-Kahrabaa	5–3	2–0	Yes
Al-Karkh	1–0	0–0	No
Al-Minaa	3–0	0–1	No
Al-Naft	2–0	1–0	Yes
Al-Najaf	1–1	0–0	No
Al-Quwa Al-Jawiya	2–3	1–1	No
Al-Samawa	3–1	4–0	Yes
Al-Sinaat Al-Kahrabaiya	3–0	1–0	Yes
Al-Talaba	0–0	2–0	No
Al-Zawraa	0–0	0–0	No
Amanat Baghdad	2–1	2–1	Yes
Erbil	2–1	1–0	Yes
Naft Al-Junoob	4–0	3–1	Yes
Naft Al-Wasat	2–0	1–0	Yes
Naft Maysan	5–1	1–1	No

Note: Al-Shorta goals listed first.

==== Classification ====
Pos	Team	Pld	W	D	L	GF	GA	GD	Pts	Qualification or relegation
1	Al-Shorta (C)	38	27	8	3	73	22	+51	89	2020 and 2021 AFC Champions League and 2019–20 Arab Club Champions Cup first round (Note: Al-Shorta qualified for both the 2020 and 2021 AFC Champions League group stages by virtue of their position as 2018–19 league champions due to the abandonment of the 2019–20 domestic season.)
2	Al-Quwa Al-Jawiya	38	25	9	4	58	27	+31	84	2021 AFC Champions League play-off round and 2019–20 Arab Club Champions Cup first round (Note: Al-Quwa Al-Jawiya qualified for the 2021 AFC Champions League play-off round by virtue of their position as 2018–19 league runners-up due to the abandonment of the 2019–20 domestic season.)
3	Al-Zawraa	38	17	14	7	57	40	+17	65	2020 AFC Champions League preliminary round 2 and 2021 play-off round and 2019–20 Arab Club Champions Cup preliminary round (Note: Al-Zawraa qualified for both the 2020 AFC Champions League preliminary round 2 and 2021 AFC Champions League play-off round by virtue of their position as 2018–19 Iraq FA Cup winners due to the abandonment of the 2019–20 domestic season.)
4	Al-Naft	38	16	15	7	60	39	+21	63	
5	Naft Maysan	38	15	14	9	57	47	+10	59	

Source: Kooora
Rules for classification: 1) points; 2) goal difference; 3) number of goals scored.
(C) Champions

==== Results summary ====
Overall								Home						Away					
Pld	W	D	L	GF	GA	GD	Pts	W	D	L	GF	GA	GD	W	D	L	GF	GA	GD
38	27	8	3	73	22	+51	89	15	3	1	42	12	+30	12	5	2	31	10	+21

Source: Kooora

==== Results by round ====
Round	1	2	3	4	5	6	7	8	9	10	11	12	13	14	15	16	17	18	19	20	21	22	23	24	25	26	27	28	29	30	31	32	33	34	35	36	37	38
Ground	H	A	H	A	H	A	H	A	H	A	A	H	A	A	H	H	A	H	H	A	H	A	A	H	A	H	A	H	A	H	H	A	H	H	A	A	H	A
Result	W	D	D	W	W	W	W	D	W	W	W	W	W	W	D	W	D	W	W	W	D	W	W	W	W	W	D	L	W	W	W	W	W	W	D	L	W	L
Position	1	4	8	6	4	2	2	3	2	1	1	1	1	1	1	1	1	1	1	1	1	1	1	1	1	1	1	1	1	1	1	1	1	1	1	1	1	1

Source: Kooora
A = Away; H = Home; W = Win; D = Draw; L = Loss

=== Iraq FA Cup ===
==== Round of 32 ====
25 October 2018 First leg	Al-Shorta	5 – 0	Haifa	Baghdad
11:30 GMT	Alassane Diallo 7', 53' (pen.), 64' (pen.); Karrar Mohammed 9'; Mohanad Ali 82'			Stadium: Amanat Baghdad Stadium

16 November 2018 Second leg	Haifa	1 – 1 (1 – 6 agg.)	Al-Shorta	Baghdad
11:00 GMT	Hussein Mundher 66'		Alassane Diallo 44'	Stadium: Al-Sinaa Stadium; Referee: Shamil Tahseen

==== Round of 16 ====
5 January 2019 First leg	Al-Kahrabaa	1 – 0	Al-Shorta	Baghdad
11:00 GMT	Alaa Mhaisen 75'		Alaa Abdul-Zahra (penalty missed) 85'	Stadium: Al-Kahrabaa Stadium

11 January 2019 Second leg	Al-Shorta	1 – 1 (1 – 2 agg.)	Al-Kahrabaa	Baghdad
10:30 GMT	Alaa Abdul-Zahra 31'		Sajjad Raad 59'	Stadium: Amanat Baghdad Stadium; Referee: Mohamed Salman

== Top goalscorers ==
=== Iraqi Premier League ===
Position	Nation	Squad Number	Name	Goals	Assists
FW	(Iraq)	10	Alaa Abdul-Zahra	28	8
FW	(Iraq)	18	Mohanad Ali	19	8
FW	(Senegal)	33	Alassane Diallo	11	2
MF	(Nigeria)	6	Maarouf Youssef	3	3
MF	(Iraq)	8	Karrar Jassim	2	11
FW	(Iraq)	12	Ammar Abdul-Hussein	2	5
DF	(Iraq)	17	Alaa Mhawi	2	2
MF	(Iraq)	19	Amjad Attwan	2	0
MF	(Iraq)	9	Mahdi Kamel	1	0
DF	(Iraq)	22	Hussam Kadhim	1	0
MF	(Iraq)	25	Saad Abdul-Amir	1	0
DF	(Iraq)	23	Waleed Salem	0	5
DF	(Iraq)	11	Dhurgham Ismail	0	2
DF	(Iraq)	2	Karrar Mohammed	0	1
DF	(Iraq)	4	Mustafa Nadhim	0	1
MF	(Iraq)	13	Amjad Waleed	0	1
DF	(Tunisia)	15	Ziad Al-Derbali	0	1
GK	(Iraq)	20	Mohammed Hameed	0	1

=== Iraq FA Cup ===
Position	Nation	Squad Number	Name	Goals	Assists
FW	(Senegal)	33	Alassane Diallo	4	0
FW	(Iraq)	10	Alaa Abdul-Zahra	1	0
FW	(Iraq)	18	Mohanad Ali	1	0
DF	(Iraq)	2	Karrar Mohammed	1	0
FW	(Iraq)	7	Mohammed Jabbar Shokan	0	1
MF	(Senegal)	14	Dominique Mendy	0	1
DF	(Iraq)	17	Alaa Mhawi	0	1
