= 2015–16 Al-Shorta SC season =

Al Shorta
2015–16 season
- President: (Iraq) Riyadh Abdul-Abbas (until 12 October) (Iraq) Ayad Abdul-Rahman (Interim) (from 12 October onwards)
- Manager: (Iraq) Hakeem Shaker (until 20 October) (Iraq) Qahtan Chathir (from 20 October to 7 March) (Iraq) Radhi Shenaishil (from 8 March to 8 May) (Iraq) Hashim Ridha (Caretaker) (from 8 May onwards)
- Ground: Al Shaab Stadium
- Iraqi Premier League: 7th
- Iraq FA Cup: Withdrew
- Top goalscorer: League: Ali Faez (5); All: Ali Faez (5)
Home colours	Away colours

The 2015–16 season was Al Shorta's 42nd season in the Iraqi Premier League, having featured in all 42 editions of the competition. Al Shorta participated in the Iraqi Premier League, while they withdrew from the Iraq FA Cup and did not enter the AFC Cup.

They entered this season having finished in third place in the league in the 2014–15 season, but this season they only managed to finish in seventh place in the league after failing to win any of their last six games. The managerial instability at the club contributed to their disappointing campaign as they had four different managers all in the same season.

== Squad ==
Note: Flags indicate national team as defined under FIFA eligibility rules; some limited exceptions apply. Players may hold more than one non-FIFA nationality.

No.	Pos.	Nation	Player
1	GK	IRQ	Ahmed Basil
2	DF	SYR	Ahmad Al Salih
5	DF	IRQ	Ali Faez
6	MF	IRQ	Ibrahim Naeem
7	FW	IRQ	Ali Salah
8	FW	IRQ	Mohanad Ali
9	MF	IRQ	Mahdi Kamel
10	FW	IRQ	Marwan Hussein
11	MF	IRQ	Amjad Attwan
12	GK	IRQ	Jalal Hassan
14	FW	IRQ	Amjad Kalaf (captain)
15	DF	IRQ	Waleed Bahar
16	FW	IRQ	Ahmed Salam

No.	Pos.	Nation	Player
17	MF	IRQ	Nabeel Sabah
18	DF	TUN	Seifeddine Chammari
19	MF	IRQ	Ahmad Ayad
20	MF	UGA	Hassan Wasswa
21	FW	IRQ	Akram Jassim
22	FW	IRQ	Hussein Karim
23	DF	IRQ	Waleed Salem
24	GK	IRQ	Haidar Raad
29	FW	IRQ	Ameer Sabah
32	DF	IRQ	Ahmed Mohammed
35	MF	IRQ	Ahmad Fadhel (vice-captain)
—	DF	IRQ	Safa Hussein

=== Departed during season ===
Note: Flags indicate national team as defined under FIFA eligibility rules; some limited exceptions apply. Players may hold more than one non-FIFA nationality.

No.	Pos.	Nation	Player
3	DF	IRQ	Bassim Abbas
4	DF	IRQ	Mohanad Arzeij
10	FW	IRQ	Hussein Ali Wahid
13	MF	IRQ	Ahmed Abdul Amir
15	DF	IRQ	Ali Bahjat
18	MF	IRQ	Ahmed Abbas
19	DF	IRQ	Mohammed Nasser Noumi
20	FW	BRA	Jhonatan Bernardo

No.	Pos.	Nation	Player
25	MF	IRQ	Murtadha Hudaib
26	FW	TOG	Backer Aloenouvo
27	MF	IRQ	Hussein Abdul Wahid Khalaf
28	MF	IRQ	Faris Hassoun
32	DF	IRQ	Anas Jassim
—	GK	IRQ	Amjad Raheem
—	DF	IRQ	Ali Hussein
—	DF	IRQ	Mustafa Mohammed

== Personnel ==
=== Technical Staff ===
Position	Name	Nationality
Manager:	Hashim Ridha	(Iraq)
Assistant manager:	Mahir Habib	(Iraq)
Goalkeeping coach:	Ghanem Ibrahim	(Iraq)
Physiotherapist:	Tonello Marilia	(Brazil)

=== Management ===
Position	Name	Nationality
President:	Ayad Abdul-Rahman	(Iraq)
Vice-president:	Mahdi Shuai	(Iraq)
Member of the Board:	Ali Abdul-Zahra	(Iraq)
Member of the Board:	Adnan Akbar Ali	(Iraq)
Member of the Board:	Khalid Abdul-Nabi	(Iraq)
Member of the Board:	Faiz Abdul-Hassan	(Iraq)
Member of the Board:	Raad Ramadan	(Iraq)
Member of the Board:	Ghazi Faisal	(Iraq)

== Kit ==
Period	Home colours	Away colours	Third colours	Supplier
September 2015				Jako
October 2015 – December 2015				Jako
February 2016 – May 2016			—	Uhlsport

== Transfers ==
=== In ===
Date	Pos.	Name	From	Fee
July 2015	MF	(Iraq) Ahmad Fadhel	(Iraq) Baghdad FC	Return from loan
July 2015	DF	(Iraq) Ali Faez	(Iraq) Arbil FC	-
July 2015	DF	(Iraq) Ahmed Mohammed	(Iraq) Arbil FC	-
July 2015	MF	(Iraq) Nabeel Sabah	(Iraq) Arbil FC	-
July 2015	MF	(Iraq) Ibrahim Naeem	(Iraq) Al Karkh	-
July 2015	MF	(Togo) Papa Koami	(Iraq) Al Karkh	-
July 2015	DF	(Iraq) Mustafa Mohammed	(Iraq) Al Jaish	-
July 2015	GK	(Iraq) Jalal Hassan	(Iraq) Baghdad FC	-
July 2015	MF	(Iraq) Amjad Attwan	(Iraq) Naft Al Wasat	-
July 2015	GK	(Iraq) Haidar Raad	(Iraq) Al Naft	-
July 2015	FW	(Iraq) Hussein Ali Wahid	(Iraq) Al Minaa	-
July 2015	MF	(Iraq) Hussein Abdul Wahid	(Iraq) Al Minaa	-
July 2015	GK	(Iraq) Amjad Raheem	(Iraq) Al Minaa	-
July 2015	MF	(Iraq) Ahmed Abbas	(Iraq) Baghdad FC	-
July 2015	DF	(Iraq) Mohanad Arzeij	(Iraq) Al Karkh	-
July 2015	FW	(Iraq) Ahmed Salam	Free agent	-
July 2015	DF	(Iraq) Mohammed Nasser Noumi	(Iraq) Naft Al Wasat	-
July 2015	MF	(Iraq) Ahmed Abdul-Amir	(Iraq) Al Talaba	-
August 2015	DF	(Iraq) Anas Jassim	(Iraq) Naft Al Junoob	-
August 2015	DF	(Syria) Ahmad Al Salih	(Kuwait) Al Arabi	-
September 2015	FW	(Brazil) Jhonatan Bernardo	(Vietnam) Than Quảng Ninh	-
October 2015	FW	(Togo) Backer Aloenouvo	Free agent	-
November 2015	DF	(Iraq) Waleed Bahar	(Iraq) Al Quwa Al Jawiya	-
November 2015	MF	(Iraq) Faris Hassoun	(Iraq) Naft Al Wasat	-
November 2015	FW	(Iraq) Ali Salah	(Iraq) Al Quwa Al Jawiya	-
November 2015	FW	(Iraq) Marwan Hussein	(Saudi Arabia) Al Khaleej	-
November 2015	MF	(Iraq) Ahmad Ayad	(Iraq) Al Quwa Al Jawiya	-
November 2015	FW	(Iraq) Ameer Sabah	(Iraq) Zakho FC	-
November 2015	MF	(Iraq) Hussein Karim	(Iraq) Karbala FC	-
November 2015	DF	(Iraq) Bassim Abbas	(Iraq) Al Kahraba	-
November 2015	DF	(Iraq) Safa Hussein	(Iraq) Najaf FC	-
November 2015	DF	(Iraq) Ali Hussein	(Iraq) Al Minaa	-
November 2015	MF	(Uganda) Hassan Wasswa	Free agent	-
January 2016	DF	(Tunisia) Seifeddine Chammari	Free agent	-

=== Out ===
Date	Pos.	Name	To	Fee
July 2015	FW	(Iraq) Marwan Hussein	(Saudi Arabia) Al Khaleej	-
July 2015	DF	(Iraq) Salam Shakir	(Saudi Arabia) Al Fateh	-
July 2015	FW	(Iraq) Ammar Abdul-Hussein	(Iraq) Al Minaa	-
July 2015	GK	(Iraq) Saif Jameel	(Iraq) Al Talaba	-
July 2015	DF	(Iraq) Karrar Mohammed	(Iraq) Al Zawraa	-
July 2015	GK	(Iraq) Mohammed Gassid	(Iraq) Al Zawraa	-
July 2015	FW	(Iraq) Alaa Abdul-Zahra	(Iraq) Al Zawraa	-
July 2015	MF	(Iraq) Hussein Abdul-Wahed	(Iraq) Al Zawraa	-
July 2015	MF	(Iraq) Muthana Khalid	(Iraq) Baghdad FC	-
July 2015	MF	(Iraq) Ahmad Ayad	(Iraq) Al Quwa Al Jawiya	-
July 2015	GK	(Iraq) Mohammed Hameed	(Iraq) Zakho FC	-
July 2015	DF	(Syria) Hamdi Al Masri	(Bahrain) Al Muharraq	-
July 2015	MF	(Iraq) Mahdi Karim	(Iraq) Al Talaba	-
August 2015	DF	(Iraq) Dhurgham Ismail	(Turkey) Çaykur Rizespor	-
August 2015	MF	(Iraq) Mustafa Mohsin	(Iraq) Naft Maysan	-
September 2015	MF	(Togo) Papa Koami	(Iraq) Al Karkh	-
November 2015	GK	(Iraq) Amjad Raheem		Released
November 2015	DF	(Iraq) Mohammed Nasser Noumi		Released
November 2015	FW	(Togo) Backer Aloenouvo		Released
November 2015	FW	(Brazil) Jhonatan Bernardo		Released
November 2015	FW	(Iraq) Hussein Ali Wahid		Released
November 2015	DF	(Iraq) Ali Bahjat		Released
November 2015	MF	(Iraq) Hussein Abdul Wahid		Released
November 2015	MF	(Iraq) Ahmed Abdul Amir		Released
November 2015	MF	(Iraq) Murtadha Hudaib		Released
November 2015	DF	(Iraq) Mustafa Mohammed		Released
November 2015	MF	(Iraq) Ahmed Abbas		Released
March 2016	DF	(Iraq) Mohanad Arzeij		Released
March 2016	DF	(Iraq) Bassim Abbas		Released
March 2016	DF	(Iraq) Anas Jassim		Released
March 2016	DF	(Iraq) Ali Hussein		Released
April 2016	MF	(Iraq) Faris Hassoun		Released

== Competitions ==
=== Iraqi Premier League ===
==== Group stage (group 2) ====
15 September 2015 1	Al Quwa Al Jawiya	2 – 0	Al Shorta	Baghdad
12:30 GMT	Hammadi Ahmad 18', 76'			Stadium: Al Quwa Al Jawiya Stadium

20 September 2015 2	Al Shorta	1 – 0	Al Sinaa	Baghdad
12:30 GMT	Mohanad Ali 79'			Stadium: Al Karkh Stadium

25 September 2015 3	Al Shorta	2 – 1	Najaf FC	Baghdad
12:30 GMT	Jhonatan Bernardo 47'; Ibrahim Naeem 90+4'		Raheem Owolabi Isiaka 78'	Stadium: Al Naft Stadium

30 September 2015 4	Zakho FC	2 – 1	Al Shorta	Zakho
12:30 GMT	Abbas Rehema 14'; Ameer Sabah 90+3'		Ahmad Fadhel 40'	Stadium: Zakho Stadium

15 October 2015 5	Al Shorta	2 – 3	Arbil FC	Baghdad
12:00 GMT	Amjad Attwan 4'; Amjad Kalaf 71'; Mahdi Kamel (yellow card) (yellow-red card) 88'		Mohammed Khalid Jaffal 51', 90+2'; Barazan Shirzad 78'	Stadium: Al Karkh Stadium

20 October 2015 6	Baghdad FC	2 – 0	Al Shorta	Baghdad
12:00 GMT	Abdullah Abdul-Amir 3', 67'		Ali Faez (penalty missed) 27'	Stadium: Baghdad FC Stadium

27 October 2015 7	Al Shorta	0 – 1	Al Minaa	Baghdad
11:30 GMT			Omar Khribin 32'	Stadium: Al Karkh Stadium

6 November 2015 8	Karbala FC	1 – 1	Al Shorta	Karbala
11:30 GMT	Jabbar Karim 69'		Nabeel Sabah 25'	Stadium: Karbala Stadium

8 December 2015 9	Al Shorta	1 – 0	Al Hedood	Baghdad
11:00 GMT	Amjad Attwan 54'			Stadium: Baghdad FC Stadium

14 December 2015 10	Al Shorta	1 – 1	Al Quwa Al Jawiya	Baghdad
11:00 GMT	Ali Salah 33'		Mohammed Hassan Abdulwahid 82'	Stadium: Al Sina'a Stadium

18 December 2015 11	Al Sinaa	0 – 2	Al Shorta	Baghdad
11:00 GMT			Ameer Sabah 29' (pen.); Ali Faez 55'	Stadium: Al Sina'a Stadium

2 February 2016 12	Arbil FC	0 – 2	Al Shorta	Arbil
11:30 GMT	Diyar Rahman (red card) 51'		Amjad Kalaf 52' (pen.); Marwan Hussein 90+1'	Stadium: Franso Hariri Stadium

7 February 2016 13	Najaf FC	3 – 2	Al Shorta	Najaf
11:30 GMT	Sultan Jasem 16' (pen.); Rahim Oulabi 66'; Hamzah Salamah 78'		Ali Faez 11'; Nabeel Sabah 90+3'	Stadium: An Najaf Stadium

11 February 2016 14	Al Shorta	1 – 0	Zakho FC	Baghdad
11:00 GMT	Ali Salah 42'		Dilovan Mahdi (red card) 7'	Stadium: Al Sina'a Stadium

17 February 2016 15	Al Shorta	1 – 0	Baghdad FC	Baghdad
11:00 GMT	Waleed Salem 48'			Stadium: Al Sina'a Stadium

24 February 2016 16	Al Minaa	2 – 0	Al Shorta	Basra
11:30 GMT	Ali Bahjat 58' (pen.); Ammar Abdul-Hussein 88'			Stadium: Al Mina'a Stadium

29 February 2016 17	Al Shorta	1 – 0	Karbala FC	Baghdad
11:30 GMT	Ahmad Al Salih 21'; Waleed Salem (red card)		Sent off (straight red)	Stadium: Al Naft Stadium

5 March 2016 18	Al Hedood	1 – 2	Al Shorta	Baghdad
11:30 GMT	Henri Jaudel Ambo 13' (red card)		Amjad Kalaf 56'; Marwan Hussein 90+2'	Stadium: Al Quwa Al Jawiya Stadium

===== Results by matchday =====
Matchday	1	2	3	4	5	6	7	8	9	10	11	12	13	14	15	16	17	18
Ground	A	H	H	A	H	A	H	A	H	H	A	A	A	H	H	A	H	A
Result	L	W	W	L	L	L	L	D	W	D	W	W	L	W	W	L	W	W
Position	9	5	3	4	7	9	9	9	7	7	7	7	7	6	3	5	5	4

Updated to match(es) played on 5 March 2016. Source: Goalzz
A = Away; H = Home; W = Win; D = Draw; L = Loss

==== Elite Stage ====
2 April 2016 1	Al Shorta	1 – 0	Al Talaba	Baghdad
12:10 GMT	Amjad Kalaf 86'			Stadium: Al Shaab Stadium; Man of the Match: Mahdi Kamel

8 April 2016 2	Al Shorta	2 – 2	Al Zawraa	Baghdad
12:30 GMT	Ali Faez 5'; Marwan Hussein 65'		Zaher Midani 21'; Alaa Abdul-Zahra 45+1'	Stadium: Al Shaab Stadium; Man of the Match: Ali Faez

18 April 2016 3	Al Shorta	0 – 1	Naft Al Wasat	Baghdad
16:00 GMT	Ahmad Fadhel (yellow card) 90' (yellow-red card)		Alaa Al Shbli 58'	Stadium: Al Shaab Stadium

25 April 2016 4	Al Minaa	2 – 2	Al Shorta	Basra
13:30 GMT	Mohammed Jabbar Shawkan 45' (pen.), 48'		Mahdi Kamel 22'; Ali Faez 59' (pen.)	Stadium: Basra International Stadium

7 May 2016 5	Al Naft	2 – 0	Al Shorta	Baghdad
13:45 GMT	Waleed Kareem 73'; Mazin Fayyadh 82'			Stadium: Al Shaab Stadium

14 May 2016 6	Al Shorta	1 – 2	Baghdad FC	Baghdad
13:45 GMT	Ali Faez 27' (pen.)		Sajjad Hussein 8'; Marwan Abbas 67'	Stadium: Al Shaab Stadium

20 May 2016 7	Al Quwa Al Jawiya	3 – 0 (w/o)	Al Shorta	Baghdad
13:30 GMT				Stadium: Al Shaab Stadium
Note: Al Quwa Al Jawiya were awarded a 3–0 victory after Al Shorta did not turn up for the match.

===== Results by matchday =====
Matchday	1	2	3	4	5	6	7
Ground	N	N	H	A	N	N	N
Result	W	D	L	D	L	L	L
Position	2	3	4	4	7	7	7

Updated to match(es) played on 20 May 2016. Source: Goalzz
A = Away; H = Home; N = Neutral; W = Win; D = Draw; L = Loss

== Other sports ==
Sport	Result
Handball	champions
Athletics	champions
Bobybuilding	champions
Archery	champions
Weightlifting	champions
Judo	champions
Wrestling	runners-up
Boxing	runners-up
Volleyball	3rd place
Basketball	3rd place in league 5th place in WABA Champions Cup; Quarter-finals in Arab Club Championship
