= 2017–18 Al-Shorta SC season =

Al-Shorta
2017–18 season
- President: (Iraq) Ayad Bunyan (until 15 March) (Iraq) Abdul-Wahab Al-Taei (from 15 March onwards)
- Manager: (Brazil) Marcos Paquetá (until 26 March) (Iraq) Ahmed Salah (Caretaker) (from 26 March to 9 April) (Iraq) Thair Jassam (from 9 April to 17 June) (Jordan) Haitham Al-Shboul (Caretaker) (from 17 June onwards)
- Ground: Al-Shaab Stadium
- Iraqi Premier League: 4th
- Top goalscorer: League: Alaa Abdul-Zahra (22); All: Alaa Abdul-Zahra (22)
Home colours	Away colours

The 2017–18 season was Al-Shorta Sports Club's 44th season in the Iraqi Premier League, having featured in all 43 previous editions of the competition. They entered the season having finished a promising third in the league in the 2016–17 season, but only managed a fourth place finish, ending up five points off champions Al-Zawraa after conceding last-minute goals in multiple matches.

== Squad ==
Note: Flags indicate national team as defined under FIFA eligibility rules; some limited exceptions apply. Players may hold more than one non-FIFA nationality.

No.	Pos.	Nation	Player
1	GK	IRQ	Ahmed Basil
2	DF	IRQ	Karrar Mohammed
3	DF	IRQ	Ali Lateef
4	DF	IRQ	Ali Faez (on loan from Çaykur Rizespor)
5	MF	IRQ	Hussein Abdul-Wahed (captain)
6	MF	GHA	Akwetey Mensah
7	FW	IRQ	Alaa Abdul-Zahra
8	FW	BRA	Jefferson Araújo
9	MF	IRQ	Mahdi Kamel
12	FW	IRQ	Ammar Abdul-Hussein
13	MF	IRQ	Amjad Waleed
14	MF	GHA	Asiedu Attobrah

No.	Pos.	Nation	Player
15	DF	IRQ	Alaa Mhawi
17	MF	IRQ	Nabeel Sabah
18	FW	IRQ	Mohanad Ali
20	GK	IRQ	Mohammed Hameed
21	GK	IRQ	Abdul-Aziz Ammar
22	DF	IRQ	Hussam Kadhim
23	DF	IRQ	Waleed Salem (vice-captain)
24	DF	IRQ	Faisal Jassim
25	MF	IRQ	Mohammed Mohsen
30	GK	IRQ	Neriman Khedher
32	DF	IRQ	Ahmed Mohammed
—	FW	IRQ	Aqeel Khairi

=== Out on loan ===
Note: Flags indicate national team as defined under FIFA eligibility rules; some limited exceptions apply. Players may hold more than one non-FIFA nationality.

No.	Pos.	Nation	Player
—	GK	IRQ	Mohammed Abbas (on loan at Al-Kahrabaa until the end of the 2017–18 season)
—	MF	IRQ	Ahmad Ayad (on loan at Al-Quwa Al-Jawiya until the end of the 2017–18 season)
—	MF	IRQ	Moamel Kareem (on loan at Al-Hudood until the end of the 2017–18 season)
—	FW	IRQ	Abdul-Qadir Tariq (on loan at Al-Talaba until the end of the 2017–18 season)
—	FW	IRQ	Karrar Hameed (on loan at Al-Kahrabaa until the end of the 2017–18 season)
—	FW	IRQ	Rafid Muayad (on loan at Al-Karkh until the end of the 2017–18 season)

=== Departed during season ===
Note: Flags indicate national team as defined under FIFA eligibility rules; some limited exceptions apply. Players may hold more than one non-FIFA nationality.

No.	Pos.	Nation	Player
8	FW	IRQ	Aymen Hussein

== Personnel ==
=== Technical Staff ===
Position	Name	Nationality
Manager:	Haitham Al-Shboul	(Jordan)
Assistant manager:	Ahmed Salah	(Iraq)
Fitness coach:	Costa López	(Brazil)
Goalkeeping coach:	Nouri Abid Zaid	(Iraq)
Director of football:	Saad Qais	(Iraq)
Administrative director:	Hashim Ridha	(Iraq)

=== Management ===
Position	Name	Nationality
President:	Abdul-Wahab Al-Taei	(Iraq)
Financial Secretary:	Uday Tariq	(Iraq)
Board Secretary	Alaa Bahar Al-Uloom	(Iraq)
Member of the Board:	Sadiq Jafar	(Iraq)
Member of the Board:	Ghazi Faisal	(Iraq)
Member of the Board:	Tahseen Al-Yassri	(Iraq)
Member of the Board:	Ali Al-Shahmani	(Iraq)
Member of the Board:	Ghalib Al-Zamili	(Iraq)
Member of the Board:	Ahsan Al-Daraji	(Iraq)

== Kit ==
Supplier: Nike

Home	Away

== Transfers ==
=== In ===
Date	Pos.	Name	From	Fee
August 2017	MF	(Iraq) Omar Jabbar	(Iraq) Karbala	-
August 2017	MF	(Iraq) Sattar Yasin	(Iraq) Al-Talaba	-
August 2017	GK	(Iraq) Neriman Khedher	(Iraq) Ghaz Al-Shamal	-
August 2017	FW	(Iraq) Ayman Hussein	(Iraq) Al-Naft	-
August 2017	MF	(Iraq) Mohammed Mohsen	(Iraq) Al-Samawa	-
August 2017	DF	(Iraq) Ali Faez	(Turkey) Çaykur Rizespor	Loan
August 2017	DF	(Iraq) Salam Shakir	(United Arab Emirates) Al-Ittihad Kalba	-
August 2017	DF	(Iraq) Hussam Kadhim	(Iraq) Al-Naft	-
August 2017	FW	(Iraq) Aqeel Khairi	(Iraq) Al-Hussein	-
August 2017	MF	(Ghana) Akwetey Mensah	(Iraq) Al-Minaa	-
September 2017	FW	(Iraq) Alaa Abdul-Zahra	(Iraq) Al-Zawraa	-
September 2017	FW	(Iraq) Ammar Abdul-Hussein	(Iraq) Al-Minaa	-
October 2017	DF	(Iraq) Alaa Mhawi	(Iraq) Al-Zawraa	-
November 2017	DF	(Iraq) Karrar Mohammed	(Iraq) Al-Zawraa	-
February 2018	MF	(Ghana) Asiedu Attobrah	Free agent	-
February 2018	FW	(Brazil) Jefferson Araújo	(Brazil) Moto Club de São Luís	-

=== Out ===
Date	Pos.	Name	To	Fee
August 2017	FW	(Iraq) Marwan Hussein	(Iran) Sepahan	-
August 2017	DF	(Iraq) Essam Yassin	(Iraq) Al-Naft	-
August 2017	FW	(Iraq) Ahmed Salam	(Iraq) Al-Hedood	-
September 2017	MF	(Iraq) Omar Jabbar		Released
October 2017	MF	(Iraq) Hatem Zidan	(Iraq) Naft Al-Wasat	-
October 2017	FW	(Iraq) Jawad Kadhim	(Iraq) Al-Quwa Al-Jawiya	-
October 2017	GK	(Iraq) Sarhang Muhsin	(Iraq) Erbil	-
October 2017	DF	(Iraq) Kosrat Baez	(Iraq) Erbil	-
October 2017	MF	(Iraq) Miran Khesro	(Iraq) Erbil	-
October 2017	MF	(Iraq) Sattar Yasin		Released
November 2017	DF	(Iraq) Salam Shakir		Released
November 2017	FW	(Iraq) Jassim Mohammed	(Iraq) Al-Talaba	-
January 2018	FW	(Iraq) Ayman Hussein	(Iraq) Al-Naft	-
January 2018	MF	(Iraq) Ahmad Ayad	(Iraq) Al-Quwa Al-Jawiya	Loan
February 2018	MF	(Iraq) Moamel Kareem	(Iraq) Al-Hudood	Loan
February 2018	FW	(Iraq) Abdul-Qadir Tariq	(Iraq) Al-Talaba	Loan

== Competitions ==
=== Iraqi Premier League ===
21 November 2017 1	Karbala	0 – 1	Al-Shorta	Karbala
11:30 GMT			Ayman Hussein 2'	Stadium: Karbala International Stadium

26 November 2017 2	Al-Shorta	4 – 1	Al-Bahri	Baghdad
14:00 GMT	Ayman Hussein 29', 71'; Alaa Abdul-Zahra 39', 74'		Mustafa Hadi 63'	Stadium: Al-Shaab Stadium

30 November 2017 3	Al-Diwaniya	1 – 2	Al-Shorta	Diwaniya
11:30 GMT	Mohammed Hatem 64'		Alaa Abdul-Zahra 71' (pen.); Abdul-Qadir Tariq 74'	Stadium: Afak Stadium

4 December 2017 4	Al-Shorta	1 – 0	Zakho	Baghdad
11:30 GMT	Ayman Hussein 90' (pen.)			Stadium: Al-Shaab Stadium

9 December 2017 5	Al-Shorta	2 – 0	Al-Hudood	Baghdad
11:30 GMT	Ayman Hussein 5'; Nabeel Sabah 46'			Stadium: Al-Sinaa Stadium

14 December 2017 6	Al-Hussein	0 – 0	Al-Shorta	Baghdad
11:30 GMT			Ayman Hussein (penalty missed) 89'	Stadium: Al-Taji Stadium

7 January 2018 7	Al-Shorta	2 – 1	Naft Al-Junoob	Baghdad
14:00 GMT	Mohanad Ali 2', 43'		Alaa Raad (red card) 40'; Mohammed Al-Ghabbash 85' (pen.)	Stadium: Al-Shaab Stadium

11 January 2018 8	Al-Shorta	1 – 0	Naft Al-Wasat	Baghdad
14:00 GMT	Amjad Waleed 36'			Stadium: Al-Shaab Stadium

15 January 2018 9	Al-Minaa	0 – 0	Al-Shorta	Basra
13:45 GMT				Stadium: Basra International Stadium

20 January 2018 10	Al-Zawraa	1 – 1	Al-Shorta	Baghdad
15:00 GMT	Amjad Kalaf 86'		Mohanad Ali 72'	Stadium: Al-Shaab Stadium

26 January 2018 11	Al-Shorta	4 – 0	Al-Najaf	Baghdad
13:45 GMT	Alaa Abdul-Zahra 8'; Mohanad Ali 26', 60'; Waleed Salem (penalty missed) 45'; Alaa Mhawi 62'			Stadium: Al-Shaab Stadium

30 January 2018 12	Al-Talaba	1 – 3	Al-Shorta	Baghdad
13:45 GMT	Karrar Mohammed 55' (o.g.)		Mahdi Kamel 5'; Nabeel Sabah 22'; Mohanad Ali 70'	Stadium: Al-Shaab Stadium

4 February 2018 13	Al-Shorta	4 – 1	Al-Samawa	Baghdad
13:45 GMT	Alaa Abdul-Zahra 28', 88'; Alaa Mhawi 52', 90'		Aamer Mathaa Sayah 10' (pen.)	Stadium: Al-Shaab Stadium

8 February 2018 14	Al-Shorta	3 – 0	Amanat Baghdad	Baghdad
13:45 GMT	Mohanad Ali 51', 90+2'; Mahdi Kamel 90+3'			Stadium: Al-Shaab Stadium

15 February 2018 15	Naft Maysan	1 – 1	Al-Shorta	Maysan
11:30 GMT	Ahmed Mohammed 69'		Mahdi Kamel 65'	Stadium: Maysan Olympic Stadium

21 February 2018 16	Al-Shorta	0 – 0	Al-Naft	Baghdad
13:45 GMT	Amjad Waleed (yellow card) (yellow-red card) 90+2			Stadium: Al-Shaab Stadium

4 March 2018 17	Al-Sinaat Al-Kahrabaiya	2 – 2	Al-Shorta	Baghdad
12:00 GMT	Ali Rasheed 50'; Taki Faleh 78'		Alaa Mhawi 30'; Mohanad Ali 72'	Stadium: Al-Sinaa Stadium

10 March 2018 18	Al-Quwa Al-Jawiya	1 – 0	Al-Shorta	Baghdad
14:00 GMT	Amjad Radhi 50' (pen.); Samal Saeed (red card) 88'		Mohammed Hameed (red card) 88'; Mohanad Ali (penalty missed) 90'	Stadium: Al-Shaab Stadium

15 March 2018 19	Al-Shorta	1 – 2	Al-Kahrabaa	Baghdad
14:00 GMT	Mohanad Ali 42'; Ali Lateef (red card) 52'		Mustafah Ali 46', (red card) 47'; Murad Mohammed 87'	Stadium: Al-Shaab Stadium

1 April 2018 20	Al-Shorta	4 – 0	Karbala	Baghdad
14:00 GMT	Hussein Abdul-Wahed 11'; Alaa Abdul-Zahra 41', 87' (pen.); Amjad Waleed 67'			Stadium: Al-Shaab Stadium

6 April 2018 21	Al-Bahri	1 – 1	Al-Shorta	Basra
12:30 GMT	Ahmed Mostafa 86'		Mohanad Ali 43'	Stadium: Al-Zubair Stadium

14 April 2018 22	Al-Shorta	2 – 0	Al-Diwaniya	Baghdad
15:00 GMT	Alaa Abdul-Zahra 61'; Ammar Abdul-Hussein 85'			Stadium: Al-Shaab Stadium

20 April 2018 23	Zakho	1 – 2	Al-Shorta	Zakho
13:00 GMT	Sattar Yaseen 19'		Mohanad Ali 12'; Alaa Abdul-Zahra 65'	Stadium: Zakho International Stadium

27 April 2018 (first half); 30 April 2018 (second half) 24	Al-Hudood	0 – 1	Al-Shorta	Baghdad
13:00 GMT			Alaa Abdul-Zahra 15'	Stadium: Al-Taji Stadium
Note: The second half was postponed for three days due to bad weather.

3 May 2018 25	Al-Shorta	3 – 0	Al-Hussein	Baghdad
16:00 GMT	Mohanad Ali 47' (pen.), 59'; Ali Faez 64'			Stadium: Al-Shaab Stadium

17 May 2018 26	Naft Al-Junoob	2 – 1	Al-Shorta	Basra
13:30 GMT	Mortaga Adel 90'; Bassim Ali 90+4'		Hussam Kadhim 78'	Stadium: Al-Zubair Stadium

21 May 2018 27	Naft Al-Wasat	3 – 3	Al-Shorta	Najaf
13:30 GMT	Alaa Abbas 28', 47'; Mohammed Qasim Majid 90+3'		Alaa Abdul-Zahra 16' (pen.), 26'; Mohanad Ali 41'	Stadium: Al-Najaf Stadium

29 May 2018 28	Al-Shorta	3 – 0 (w/o)	Al-Minaa	Baghdad
19:00 GMT				Stadium: Al-Shaab Stadium
Note: Al Shorta were awarded a 3–0 victory after Al-Minaa failed to turn up for the game.

3 June 2018 29	Al-Shorta	0 – 0	Al-Zawraa	Baghdad
19:00 GMT				Stadium: Al-Shaab Stadium

8 June 2018 30	Al-Najaf	0 – 2	Al-Shorta	Najaf
13:30 GMT			Alaa Abdul-Zahra 40'; Alaa Mhawi 43'	Stadium: Al-Najaf Stadium

13 June 2018 31	Al-Shorta	1 – 0	Al-Talaba	Baghdad
19:00 GMT	Waleed Salem 77'			Stadium: Al-Shaab Stadium

17 June 2018 32	Al-Samawa	2 – 2	Al-Shorta	Samawa
13:45 GMT	Hussain Salman 90+1'; Mohamed Nizar 90+4'		Alaa Abdul-Zahra 30', 65'	Stadium: Al-Samawa Stadium

23 June 2018 33	Amanat Baghdad	0 – 3	Al-Shorta	Baghdad
13:45 GMT			Alaa Abdul-Zahra 40', 45' (pen.); Mahdi Kamel 88'	Stadium: Amanat Baghdad Stadium

29 June 2018 34	Al-Shorta	2 – 0	Naft Maysan	Baghdad
13:45 GMT	Alaa Abdul-Zahra 9'; Amjad Waleed 66'			Stadium: Al-Shaab Stadium

3 July 2018 35	Al-Naft	2 – 2	Al-Shorta	Baghdad
13:45 GMT	Mohammed Dawood 16' (pen.); Hussam Kadhim 90' (o.g.)		Alaa Abdul-Zahra 25' (pen.); Ammar Abdul-Hussein 88'	Stadium: Al-Sinaa Stadium

8 July 2018 36	Al-Shorta	3 – 1	Al-Sinaat Al-Kahrabaiya	Baghdad
13:45 GMT	Amjad Waleed 22', 70'; Alaa Abdul-Zahra 45' (pen.)		Husain Tuamah 50'	Stadium: Al-Shaab Stadium

13 July 2018 37	Al-Shorta	1 – 0	Al-Quwa Al-Jawiya	Baghdad
16:00 GMT	Alaa Abdul-Zahra 40'			Stadium: Al-Shaab Stadium

18 July 2018 38	Al-Kahrabaa	0 – 1	Al-Shorta	Baghdad
13:45 GMT			Mohanad Ali 35'; Alaa Abdul-Zahra (penalty missed) 90+2'	Stadium: Al-Taji Stadium
