= 2019–20 Iraqi Premier League =

Iraqi Premier League
- Season: 2019–20
- Champions: N/A (season cancelled)

The 2019–20 Iraqi Premier League (Arabic: الدوري العراقي الممتاز 2019–20) was the 46th season of the Iraqi Premier League, the highest division for Iraqi association football clubs, since its establishment in 1974. The season started on 18 September 2019 in a double round-robin format, but was postponed after 23 October 2019 due to the 2019–2020 Iraqi protests with matches from the first four rounds having been played.

On 25 January 2020, with the withdrawal of five of the 20 teams that started the season, the Iraq Football Association (IFA) decided to cancel the 20-team tournament and restart the competition under a new format with 15 teams, and not to relegate any teams at the end of the season. The league was restarted on 16 February 2020 as a single round-robin tournament.

Matches from the first five rounds of the restarted season were played, but the competition was postponed after 10 March 2020 due to the COVID-19 pandemic, and it was officially cancelled on 3 June 2020. The results of the 2018–19 season were used to determine the teams that qualified for the 2021 AFC Champions League.

== Teams ==
Locations of the 2019–20 Iraqi Premier League teams.

Team	Manager	Location	Stadium	Capacity
Al-Hudood	(Iraq) Mudhafar Jabbar	Baghdad	Al-Taji Stadium	5,000
Al-Kahrabaa	(Iraq) Abbas Attiya	Baghdad	Al-Taji Stadium	5,000
Al-Minaa	(Romania) Valeriu Tița	Basra	Al-Fayhaa Stadium	10,000
Al-Naft	(Iraq) Yahya Alwan	Baghdad	Al-Naft Stadium	3,000
Al-Najaf	(Iraq) Hassan Ahmed	Najaf	Al-Najaf Stadium	12,000
Al-Quwa Al-Jawiya	(Iraq) Ayoub Odisho	Baghdad	Al-Shaab Stadium	34,200
Al-Shorta	(Iraq) Abdul-Ghani Shahad	Baghdad	Al-Shaab Stadium	34,200
Al-Sinaat Al-Kahrabaiya	(Iraq) Adel Nima	Baghdad	Al-Sinaa Stadium	10,000
Al-Talaba	(Iraq) Ahmed Khalaf	Baghdad	Al-Shaab Stadium	34,200
Al-Zawraa	(Iraq) Basim Qasim	Baghdad	Al-Shaab Stadium	34,200
Amanat Baghdad	(Iraq) Essam Hamad	Baghdad	Amanat Baghdad Stadium	5,000
Erbil	(Croatia) Rodion Gačanin	Erbil	Franso Hariri Stadium	25,000
Naft Al-Junoob	(Iraq) Ammar Hussein	Basra	Al-Fayhaa Stadium	10,000
Naft Al-Wasat	(Iraq) Radhi Shenaishil	Najaf	Karbala International Stadium	30,000
Naft Maysan	(Iraq) Ahmed Daham	Amara	Maysan Olympic Stadium	25,000
Withdrawn teams: Al-Diwaniya, Al-Karkh, Al-Qasim, Al-Samawa, Zakho

== Original season ==
=== League table at abandonment ===
Pos	Team	Pld	W	D	L	GF	GA	GD	Pts
1	Al-Minaa	4	2	2	0	6	3	+3	8
2	Al-Quwa Al-Jawiya	3	2	1	0	3	0	+3	7
3	Al-Naft	4	2	1	1	5	3	+2	7
4	Al-Sinaat Al-Kahrabaiya	3	2	0	1	7	4	+3	6
5	Naft Al-Wasat	2	2	0	0	5	2	+3	6
6	Al-Zawraa	3	1	2	0	4	2	+2	5
7	Al-Najaf	3	1	2	0	3	2	+1	5
8	Naft Al-Junoob	4	1	2	1	6	6	0	5
9	Al-Kahrabaa	4	1	2	1	5	5	0	5
10	Amanat Baghdad	3	1	1	1	3	2	+1	4
11	Erbil	4	0	4	0	3	3	0	4
12	Al-Shorta	3	1	1	1	4	5	−1	4
13	Al-Karkh	3	1	1	1	5	7	−2	4
14	Al-Diwaniya	4	1	0	3	5	8	−3	3
15	Al-Qasim	3	1	0	2	1	4	−3	3
16	Al-Samawa	3	0	2	1	3	4	−1	2
17	Al-Hudood	4	0	2	2	2	5	−3	2
18	Al-Talaba	1	0	1	0	4	4	0	1
19	Naft Maysan	2	0	1	1	3	5	−2	1
20	Zakho	4	0	1	3	2	5	−3	1

Source: Kooora
Rules for classification: 1) points; 2) goal difference; 3) number of goals scored.

=== Results ===
Home \ Away	DIW	HUD	KAH	KAR	MIN	NFT	NJF	QSM	QWJ	SMA	SHR	SNK	TLB	ZWR	AMN	ERB	NFJ	NFW	NFM	ZAK
Al-Diwaniya								2–0												
Al-Hudood							0–0								0–0					
Al-Kahrabaa									0–1							1–1				
Al-Karkh										2–2		3–2			0–3					
Al-Minaa		3–1																		1–0
Al-Naft	3–1																1–0			
Al-Najaf			2–2																	
Al-Qasim						1–0														
Al-Quwa Al-Jawiya					0–0															
Al-Samawa														0–0						
Al-Shorta		2–1																		
Al-Sinaat Al-Kahrabaiya								2–0											3–1	
Al-Talaba																	4–4			
Al-Zawraa					2–2						2–0									
Amanat Baghdad									0–2											
Erbil						1–1											0–0			1–1
Naft Al-Junoob	2–1																			
Naft Al-Wasat	3–1									2–1										
Naft Maysan											2–2									
Zakho			1–2				0–1													

Source: Kooora
Legend: Blue = home team win; Yellow = draw; Red = away team win.

== Restarted season ==
=== League table at abandonment ===
Pos	Team	Pld	W	D	L	GF	GA	GD	Pts
1	Al-Naft	5	3	2	0	6	1	+5	11
2	Al-Quwa Al-Jawiya	4	3	1	0	7	2	+5	10
3	Naft Al-Wasat	5	3	0	2	3	2	+1	9
4	Al-Najaf	4	2	2	0	5	1	+4	8
5	Al-Zawraa	3	2	1	0	2	0	+2	7
6	Al-Talaba	5	2	1	2	7	6	+1	7
7	Al-Minaa	4	2	1	1	3	3	0	7
8	Al-Hudood	4	2	0	2	4	3	+1	6
9	Erbil	5	2	0	3	5	6	−1	6
10	Al-Sinaat Al-Kahrabaiya	5	2	0	3	6	11	−5	6
11	Al-Shorta	3	1	2	0	7	5	+2	5
12	Naft Al-Junoob	5	1	1	3	1	4	−3	4
13	Amanat Baghdad	5	0	3	2	2	5	−3	3
14	Al-Kahrabaa	5	0	2	3	3	7	−4	2
15	Naft Maysan	4	0	0	4	2	7	−5	0

Source: Kooora
Rules for classification: 1) points; 2) goal difference; 3) number of goals scored.

=== Results ===
Home \ Away	HUD	KAH	MIN	NFT	NJF	QWJ	SHR	SNK	TLB	ZWR	AMN	ERB	NFJ	NFW	NFM
Al-Hudood													2–0	1–0	
Al-Kahrabaa				0–2		0–0	3–3								
Al-Minaa				0–2									1–0		
Al-Naft	1–0										1–1				
Al-Najaf		1–0						3–0			0–0				
Al-Quwa Al-Jawiya									2–1						2–1
Al-Shorta			1–1								3–1				
Al-Sinaat Al-Kahrabaiya						0–3									2–0
Al-Talaba					1–1			3–1							2–1
Al-Zawraa		1–0							1–0						
Amanat Baghdad										0–0				0–1	
Erbil	2–1							2–3							
Naft Al-Junoob				0–0								1–0			
Naft Al-Wasat			0–1									1–0	1–0		
Naft Maysan												0–1			

Source: Kooora
Legend: Blue = home team win; Yellow = draw; Red = away team win.

=== Statistics ===
==== Hat-tricks ====
Player	For	Against	Result	Date
(Iraq) Aymen Hussein	Al-Quwa Al-Jawiya	Al-Sinaat Al-Kahrabaiya	3–0 (A)	22 February 2020

Notes

(A) – Away team

== Awards ==
Award	Winner	Club
Soccer Iraq Goal of the Season	(Iraq) Saad Abdul-Amir	Al-Shorta
