= Mustafa Nadhim =

Iraqi footballer

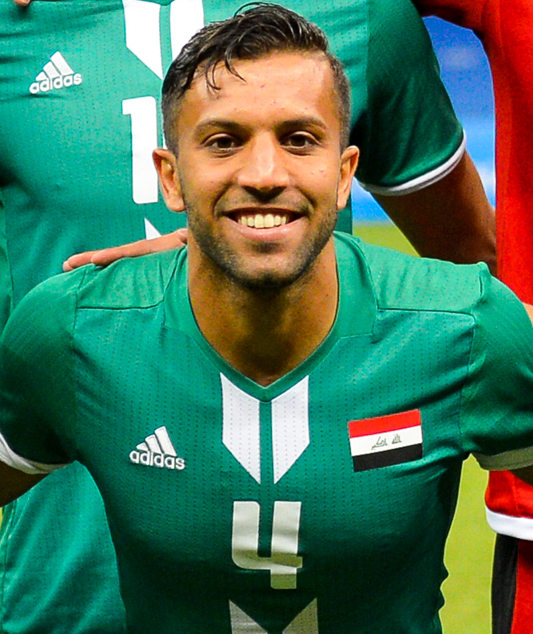
- Nadhim with Iraq U23 in 2016

Personal information
- Full name: Mustafa Nadhim Jari Al-Shabbani
- Date of birth: 23 September 1993 (age 33)
- Place of birth: Al Diwaniyah, Iraq
- Height: 1.80 m (5 ft 11 in)
- Position: Center-back

Youth career
- 2009–2010: Al-Diwaniya

Senior career*
Years	Team	Apps	(Gls)
2010–2013	Najaf		
2013–2014	Al-Quwa Al-Jawiya		
2014–2015	Erbil		
2015–2016	Naft Al-Wasat		
2016–2017	Al-Minaa		
2017–2018	Najaf		
2018–2019	Al-Shorta	10	(0)
2019–2020	Al-Zawraa		
2020	Al-Shorta		
2020–2022	Al-Diwaniya		
2022	Al-Najma		
2022–2023	Al-Faisaly		
2023	→ Al-Shorta (loan)	6	(0)
2023–2025	Al-Zawraa		
2025–2026	Amanat Baghdad		
2026	Al-Gharraf		

International career^{‡}
2011–2013	Iraq U20	16	(0)
2011–2016	Iraq U23	30	(4)
2013–	Iraq	30	(3)
- * Club domestic league appearances and goals as of 3 April 2020 ‡ National team caps and goals as of 11 November 2021

Mustafa Nadhim Jari Al-Shabbani (Arabic: مصطفى ناظم جاري, born 23 September 1993) is an Iraqi footballer who last played as a defender for Al-Gharraf, and the Iraq national team.

The defender played University football in Diwaniya, aged 16 when in Iraq most people would begin university at 18. In that same year, 2010, Mustafa helped guide his University to the Southern Universities Championship title for the first time with a comfortable 2–0 victory over Kufa University with one of the goals scored by future Olympic player Safa Jabar.

== Club career ==
=== Al Najaf ===
Mustafa started his career at Al Najaf where he spent three seasons with club, scoring nine goals.

=== Al Quwa Al Jawiya ===
Mustafa signed for Al Quwa Al Jawiya for the 2013/14 season in which the team finished 4th. He left the team at the end of the season, signing for Erbil.

=== Erbil SC ===
Mustafa spent 2015 with northern club Erbil, before leaving due to financial problems.

=== Naft Al Wasat ===
Mustafa signed for reigning champions Naft Al-Wasat ahead of the 2015/16 season, he left in the winter transfer window in 2017.

=== Al Mina'a ===
On 27 January 2017, Mustafa signed for Basrah Club Al-Minaa. He made his debut vs Al-Hussein on February 24, keeping a clean sheet in a 1–0 away victory.

== International career ==
Mustafa Nadhim was one of Hakim Shaker's youth players and after sitting on the bench throughout the 23rd Gulf Cup in Saudi Arabia, he was given his international debut by his mentor in an unofficial friendly against Malaysia. The defender played at right back that day and scored an acrobatic overhead kick. On February 6, 2013 Mustafa Nadhim made his official International debut against Indonesia in the 2015 AFC Asian Cup qualification.

=== International goals ===
Scores and results list Iraq's goal tally first.

#	Date	Venue	Opponent	Score	Result	Competition
1.	6 October 2013	Camille Chamoun Sports City Stadium, Beirut	Yemen	2–1	3–2	Friendly
2.	21 February 2014	Zabeel Stadium, Dubai	North Korea	1–0	2–0	Friendly
3.	4 August 2018	Faisal Al-Husseini International Stadium, Al-Ram	Palestine	2–0	3–0	Friendly
4.	12 January 2023	Basra International Stadium, Basra	Yemen	1–0	5–0	25th Arabian Gulf Cup

== Honors ==
=== Club ===
Al-Shorta

- Iraqi Premier League: 2018–19, 2022–23

Al-Faisaly

- Jordanian Pro League: 2022
- Jordan Shield Cup: 2023

=== International ===
Iraq Youth team

- 2012 AFC U-19 Championship: runner-up
- 2013 FIFA U-20 World Cup: 4th Place

Iraq U-23

- AFC U-22 Championship: 2013

Iraq

- 21st Arabian Gulf Cup: runner-up
- 25th Arabian Gulf Cup: winner
