= Saeed Mohsen Ali =

Iraqi footballer

Personal information
- Full name: Saeed Mohsen Ali
- Date of birth: 22 January 1982 (age 44)
- Place of birth: Iraq
- Positions: Attacking midfielder; central midfielder

Youth career
- Diwaniya

Senior career*
Years	Team	Apps	(Gls)
1999–2001	Najaf FC		
2001–2002	Al-Jazira		
2002–2007	Najaf FC		
2007–2008	Bahrain Club		
2008–	Najaf FC		

International career^{‡}
2001–2009	Iraq	18	(0)

Managerial career
- 2019–2021: Al-Diwaniya FC (Assist. coach)
- 2021: Al-Diwaniya FC (Caretaker)
- 2021: Al-Diwaniya FC (Assist. coach)
- * Club domestic league appearances and goals ‡ National team caps and goals as of July 13, 2009

Saeed Mohsen Ali (Arabic: سعيد محسن علي) (Born 22 January 1982) is an Iraqi football player who currently plays for Najaf FC in Iraq

== Coaching career ==
=== Al-Diwaniya FC ===
Mohsen began his coaching career as an assistant to the Iraqi Hamid Rahim in Al-Diwaniya FC club, first coaching experience for the past player.

=== Managerial statistics ===
As of 11 March 2021

Team	Nat	From	To	Record				
Team	Nat	From	To	G	W	D	L	Win %
Al-Diwaniya (Caretaker)	(Iraq)	24 February 2021	11 March 2021	3	0	2	1	0.00
Total				3	0	2	1	0.00

== Honours ==
=== Club ===
Naft Al-Wasat

- Iraqi Premier League: 2014–15
