= Alassane Diallo =

Alassane Diallo may refer to:

- Alassane Diallo (Senegalese footballer), born 1989
- Alassane Diallo (Malian footballer), born 1995
