= Hussein AlAnkoshei =

- حسين العنكوشي
- Born: Hussein Ali Kareem AlAnkoshei; 16 September 1987 (age 39); Al-Qādisiyyah Governorate, Iraq
- Education: Baghdad University; University of London
- Occupations: Businessman, lawyer, politician
- Years active: 2016-present
- Employer: Parliament of iraq
- Title: President of Al-Diwaniya SC Member of iraqi parliament
- Children: 3

Hussein Ali AlAnkoshei (Arabic: حسين العنكوشي; born 16 September 1987) is an Iraqi politician, sport personality, businessman, and lawyer. He is a member of the Parliament of Iraq (2026–2030), advisor of the prime minister of Iraq, the president of Al-Diwaniya SC, and the chairman and CEO of Al-Ankoshei Group.

== Biography ==
Al-Ankoushi joined the Eradaa Movement Party in 2016 and served as director of the Irada Movement office in Al-Qādisiyyah Governorate. He later withdrew from the Eradaa Movement Party. In 2019, he was elected as President of the Al-Diwaniya SC.

He presented himself as a candidate for the presidency of the Iraqi Football Association (IFA) in 2021, but later withdrew in favor of Adnan Dirjal. He returned as president of Al-Diwaniya SC in October 2025 by decision of the Iraqi Olympic Committee.

== See also ==
- Al-Diwaniya SC
- Iraqi Football Association
