= Alaa Abdul-Zahra =

Iraqi footballer (born 1987)

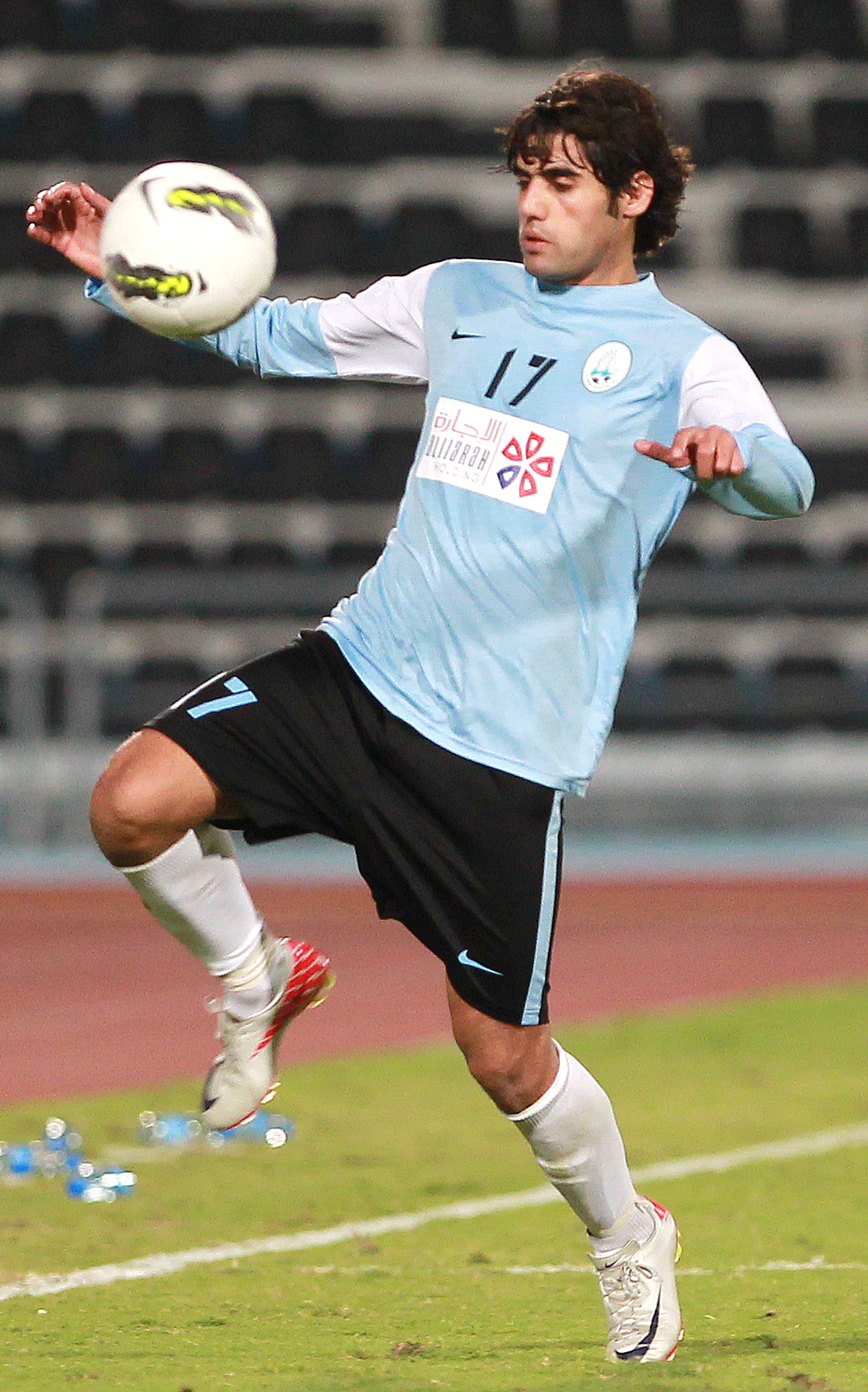
- Abdul-Zahra with Al Kharaitiyat in 2011

Personal information
- Full name: Alaa Abdul-Zahra Khashen Al-Azzawi
- Date of birth: 22 December 1987 (age 38)
- Place of birth: Baghdad, Iraq
- Height: 1.73 m (5 ft 8 in)
- Positions: Attacking midfielder; forward

Team information
- Current team: Al-Talaba
- Number: 10

Youth career
- Al-Karkh
- Al-Difaa Al-Jawi
- 2003–2004: Al-Zawraa

Senior career*
Years	Team	Apps	(Gls)
2004–2006	Al-Zawraa	30	(9)
2006–2007	Mes Kerman	11	(4)
2007–2008	Shabab Al-Ordon	2	(1)
2008	Al-Merrikh	18	(11)
2008–2009	Al-Khor	35	(24)
2009–2011	Al Kharaitiyat	42	(16)
2011–2012	Al-Wakrah	10	(4)
2012	Qatar SC	9	(2)
2012–2014	Duhok	47	(26)
2014	Tractor Sazi	5	(0)
2014–2015	Al-Shorta	17	(6)
2015–2017	Al-Zawraa	53	(32)
2017–2020	Al-Shorta	79	(53)
2020–2021	Al-Zawraa	22	(13)
2021–2024	Al-Shorta	71	(19)
2024–2025	Al-Minaa	30	(11)
2025–	Al-Talaba	31	(4)

International career
2004–2006	Iraq U20	8	(9)
2006–2008	Iraq U23	28	(15)
2007–2021	Iraq	124	(17)
- * Club domestic league appearances and goals as of 2 July 2025

Alaa Abdul-Zahra Khashen Al-Azzawi (Arabic: علاء عبدالزهرة خشَن العزاوي , born 22 December 1987), is an Iraqi football player who plays as a forward for Iraq Stars League club Al-Talaba and for the Iraq national team.

He can be deployed as an attacking midfielder or a second striker, and since 2016 plays as a striker. He is the third-most capped player in the history of the Iraqi national team.

== Club career ==
=== Early life ===
Abdul-Zahra was born in Baghdad, Iraq. Affectionately nicknamed 'the Kaká of Iraq' road towards fame looked relatively straightforward. At the age of 16, he got his playing career off to a dream start when he was discovered and signed by Iraqi powerhouses Al-Zawraa.

=== Al-Zawraa ===
In 2004 at the age of 16, Abdul-Zahra made a move to Al-Zawraa. He was part of Al-Zawraa's squad for the AFC Champions League in 2005 with the number 29 shirt. A year later he won with them the Iraq Super League in 2006.

=== Mes Kerman ===
After the AFC Youth Championship 2006, Abdul-Zahra signed a one-year contract with the newly promoted Iranian Premier League club Mes Kerman. He played 11 times for them and scoring 4 goals, as the team finished in 7th place, before moving to play in Jordan.

=== Shabab Al-Ordon ===
Abdul-Zahra signed with Duhok FC Before the start of Iraq Super League (2007-2008) but he did not go to Iraq, Instead he signed another contract with the Jordanian club Shabab Al-Ordon, and claimed that signing with Duhok FC was incomplete.

On 29 December 2007, in his first appearance with Shabab Al-Ordon, Abdul-Zahra scored his first goal with his new team against Hussein Irbid in Jordan Cup, helped his team to win 3–2 and qualify to the quarterfinals. On 3 January 2008, Abdul-Zahra played his second and last match with Shabab Al-Ordon this season against Al-Arabi Irbid in Jordan League, which they won 2–3.

=== Al-Merrikh ===
Abdul-Zahra and his Olympic team's mate Saad Attiya signed a Contract with Sudan giant club Al-Merrikh. He won Sudan Premier League and Sudan Cup 2008, and scored 9 goals.

=== Time in Qatar ===
After the success in the Sudanese League, Alaa signed a contract with the Qatari side Al-Khor. which he played with 14 league matches scoring eight goals. After the great months he spent in Al-Khor Alaa moved to another Qatari club this time with Al Kharaitiyat. Scoring 16 goals in 42 occasions, the club finished 8th in the league that season.

In June 2011, Alaa signed a one-year deal with Qatar side Al-Wakrah. playing 10 times and scoring 3 goals, the team finished 7th in the league.

In June 2012, Alaa signed a Half Season with Qatar side Qatar SC. and scored 2 goals.

=== Duhok ===
Before the start of the 2012–13 season, Abdul-Zahra signed with Duhok FC and made a total of 47 appearances in 2012–13 and 2013–14 scoring 26 goals, plus a further 5 goals in the AFC Cup.

=== Tractor Sazi ===
On 20 July 2014, Abdul-Zahra joined Tractor Sazi with signing a one-season contract with the club. He played his first match for Tractor Sazi on 8 August 2014 against Zob Ahan. after a Less than two months with Tabrizi side, he decided leave Tractor Sazi. After pressure from the national team coach to leave the club, And his desire to play the striker instead of the midfielder. He officially released on 10 September 2014.

=== Al-Shorta ===
Abdul-Zahra signed with Al-Shorta in September 2014. and scored 8 goals. The club finished 3rd in the league that season and reached the round of 16 at the AFC Cup.

=== Return to Al-Zawraa ===
Abdul-Zahra returned to Al-Zawraa in July 2015. he became instrumental to the team as Al Zawraa went on to win the Iraqi League 2015–16. The team also finished second in the Iraq FA Cup, after a 2–0 loss to Al Quwa Al Jawiya. The following season, Ala'a finished as the top goal scorer of the Iraqi league for the first time in his career with 23 goals, however Al Zawraa failed to retain the title and finished in a disappointing 4th place. The team reached the final of the Iraqi FA Cup once again, where he scored the winner in the 94th minute to win the championship.

=== Second stint at Al-Shorta ===
On 13 September 2017, Abdul-Zahra signing a one-season contract with Al-Shorta. He scored many goals continuously after sacked Brazilian coach Marcos Paquetá on 27 March 2018. He finished his season with Al-Shorta with 22 goals, including 5 penalties, in 37 matches in the league, as the team finished in 4th position. In the 2018–19 season, he achieved the top scorer of the league with 28 goals, as his club won the league title.

On 14 September 2019, he won his first Super Cup with Al-Shorta, after a 4–3 victory on penalties, over his former club Al-Zawraa.

=== Third stint at Al-Zawraa ===
In late June 2020, Abdul-Zahra rejoined Al-Zawraa, where he played for one season, as the club finished second in the league table in the 2020–21 season.

=== Third stint at Al-Shorta ===
In August 2021, Abdul-Zahra returned to Al-Shorta, then extended his contract for another year in 2022. He won two consecutive league titles in 2021–22 and 2022–23, in addition to another Super Cup trophy.

On 27 July 2023, he scored the only goal from a penalty in a 1–0 victory over Club Sfaxien in the Arab Club Champions Cup first match.

== International career ==
He first made his mark on the international scene with Iraq's youth team at the 2004 AFC Youth Championship in Malaysia. Two years later, he would repeat this feat prominently at the 2006 AFC Youth Championship, where the striker finished as the tournament's second-top scorer with four goals despite his team's early exit at the quarter-final stage. From there, he went on to showcase his talents in Asia's qualifying final round for the Olympic Football Tournament Beijing 2008 by topping the scoring charts with a six-goal haul.

At senior level, he featured in two of Iraq's eight qualifying matches for the 2010 FIFA World Cup at South Africa, coming off bench to play in a goalless draw against Pakistan before featuring in the 2–0 loss to Qatar.

Alaa played for the Iraq national team from June 2007 to January 2018, scoring 15 goals. In October 2019, he was called up by Iraq team for games against Hong Kong and Cambodia.

== Style of play ==
Abdul-Zahra, a playmaker and offensive play, and is often involved in passing moves which lead to goals, through their vision, technique, ball control, creativity, and passing ability. and More recently play striker.

== Career statistics ==
=== Club ===
As of 14 July 2024

Appearances and goals by club, season and competition
Club	Season	League			Cup		Continental		Others		Total	
Club	Season	Division	Apps	Goals	Apps	Goals	Apps	Goals	Apps	Goals	Apps	Goals
Al-Zawraa	2004–05	Iraq Stars League	11	3	—						11	3
Al-Zawraa	2005–06	Iraq Stars League	19	6	—						19	6
Al-Zawraa	2015–16	Iraq Stars League	18	9	3	2					21	11
Al-Zawraa	2016–17	Iraq Stars League	35	23	2	1	6	2			43	26
Al-Zawraa	2020–21	Iraq Stars League	22	13	1	0	1	1	3	1	27	15
Al-Zawraa	Total		105	54	6	3	7	3	3	1	121	61
Mes Kerman	2006–07	Persian Gulf Pro League	11	3							11	3
Shabad Al-Ordon	2007–08	Jordanian Pro League	2	1	2	1					4	2
Al-Merrikh	2008	Sudan Premier League	11	3			5	3			16	6
Al-Khor	2008–09	Qatar Stars League	13	6							13	6
Al Kharaitiyat	2009–10	Qatar Stars League	21	10							21	10
Al Kharaitiyat	2010–11	Qatar Stars League	21	6							21	6
Al Kharaitiyat	Total		42	16							42	16
Al-Wakrah	2011–12	Qatar Stars League	10	3							10	3
Qatar	2011–12	Qatar Stars League	9	1							9	1
Duhok	2012–13	Iraqi Elite League	33	20			2	5			35	25
Duhok	2013–14	Iraqi Elite League	14	6	—						14	6
Duhok	Total		47	26			2	5			49	31
Tractor	2014–15	Persian Gulf Pro League	5	0							5	0
Al-Shorta	2014–15	Iraq Stars League	17	6	—		7	2	—		24	8
Al-Shorta	2017–18	Iraq Stars League	37	22	—		—		—		37	22
Al-Shorta	2018–19	Iraq Stars League	36	28	4	1	—		—		40	29
Al-Shorta	2019–20	Iraq Stars League	6	3	0	0	2	0	7	1	15	4
Al-Shorta	2021–22	Iraq Stars League	18	4	1	0	—		—		19	4
Al-Shorta	2022–23	Iraq Stars League	27	12	1	0	—		5	1	33	13
Al-Shorta	2023–24	Iraq Stars League	26	3	4	0	—		—		30	3
Al-Shorta	Total		167	78	10	1	9	2	12	2	198	83
Career total			422	191	18	5	23	14	15	3	478	213

=== International ===
Appearances and goals by national team and year
National team	Year	Apps	Goals
Iraq	2007	3	0
Iraq	2008	4	0
Iraq	2009	10	2
Iraq	2010	9	3
Iraq	2011	19	5
Iraq	2012	15	2
Iraq	2013	15	1
Iraq	2014	3	0
Iraq	2015	10	1
Iraq	2016	11	0
Iraq	2017	12	1
Iraq	2018	1	0
Iraq	2019	5	1
Iraq	2021	7	1
Total		124	17

As of 29 May 2021

Scores and results list Iraq's goal tally first, score column indicates score after each Abdul-Zahra goal.

List of international goals scored by Alaa Abdul-Zahra
No.	Date	Venue	Opponent	Score	Result	Competition
1	10 January 2009	Royal Oman Police Stadium, Muscat, Oman	Kuwait	1–1	1–1	19th Arabian Gulf Cup
2	13 July 2009	Al-Shaab Stadium, Baghdad, Iraq	Palestine	3–0	4–0	Friendly
3	26 November 2010	May 22 Stadium, Aden, Yemen	Bahrain	1–0	3–2	20th Arabian Gulf Cup
4	26 November 2010	May 22 Stadium, Aden, Yemen	Bahrain	2–1	3–2	20th Arabian Gulf Cup
5	2 December 2010	May 22 Stadium, Aden, Yemen	Kuwait	2–1	2–2 (a.e.t.) (4–5 p)	20th Arabian Gulf Cup
6	26 March 2011	Khalid Bin Mohammed Stadium, Sharjah, United Arab Emirates	North Korea	1–0	2–0	Friendly
7	26 March 2011	Khalid Bin Mohammed Stadium, Sharjah, United Arab Emirates	North Korea	2–0	2–0	Friendly
8	29 June 2011	Franso Hariri Stadium, Erbil, Iraq	Syria	1–2	1–2	Friendly
9	23 July 2011	Franso Hariri Stadium, Erbil, Iraq	Yemen	1–0	2–0	2014 FIFA World Cup qualification
10	6 September 2011	Jalan Besar Stadium, Kallang, Singapore	Singapore	1–0	2–0	2014 FIFA World Cup qualification
11	5 July 2012	Prince Abdullah al-Faisal Stadium, Jeddah, Saudi Arabia	Saudi Arabia	1–0	1–0	2012 Arab Nations Cup
12	16 October 2012	Grand Hamad Stadium, Doha, Qatar	Australia	1–0	1–2	2014 FIFA World Cup qualification
13	11 November 2013	Prince Mohammed Stadium, Zarqa, Jordan	Syria	2–1	2–1	Friendly
14	26 August 2015	Saida International Stadium, Saida, Lebanon	Lebanon	3–2	3–2	Friendly
15	1 June 2017	Basra Sports City, Basra, Iraq	Jordan	1–0	1–0	Friendly
16	29 November 2019	Khalifa International Stadium, Doha, Qatar	United Arab Emirates	2–0	2–0	24th Arabian Gulf Cup
17	29 May 2021	Al Fayhaa Stadium, Basra, Iraq	Nepal	1–0	6–2	Friendly

== Honours ==
Al-Zawraa

- Iraqi Premier League: 2005–06, 2015–16
- Iraq FA Cup: 2016–17

Al-Merreikh

- Sudan Premier League: 2008
- Sudan Cup: 2008

Al-Shorta

- Iraq Stars League: 2018–19, 2021–22, 2022–23, 2023–24
- Iraq FA Cup: 2023–24
- Iraqi Super Cup: 2019, 2022

Iraq

- Arab Nations Cup: 2012 bronze medal
- Arabian Gulf Cup: 2013 runner-up
- Asian Games: 2006 runners-up

Individual

- Iraqi Premier League top scorer: 2016–17 (23 goals), 2018–19 (28 goals)
- 2008 Summer Olympics qualification (AFC) top scorer: (6 goals)
- 20th Arabian Gulf Cup: joint top scorer (3 goals)

== See also ==
- List of footballers with 100 or more caps
