= Amjad Walid =

Iraqi footballer

Personal information
- Full name: Amjad Waleed Hussein
- Date of birth: 9 November 1993 (age 32)
- Place of birth: Baghdad, Iraq
- Height: 1.72 m (5 ft 7 1/2 in)
- Positions: Left winger; left-back

Senior career*
Years	Team	Apps	(Gls)
2008–2009	Duhok		(1)
2009	Al-Kahrabaa		(0)
2009–2012	Duhok		(2)
2012	Al-Talaba		(0)
2012–2015	Al-Zawraa		(12)
2015–2016	Naft Al-Wasat		(6)
2016–2020	Al-Shorta		(12)
2020–2022	Zakho		(3)
2022–2023	Al-Shorta	0	(0)

International career^{‡}
2009–2010	Iraq U20	8	(3)
2015–2016	Iraq U23	6	(5)
2015–2016	Iraq	6	(0)
- * Club domestic league appearances and goals as of 30 January 2022 ‡ National team caps and goals as of 24 August 2016

Amjad Waleed Hussein (Arabic: أمجد وليد حسين, born 9 November 1993) is an Iraqi footballer who plays as a left-winger or left-back.

== International career ==
On August 26, 2015, Waleed made his first international cap with Iraq against Lebanon in a friendly match.

== Honours ==
Duhok

- Iraqi Premier League: 2009–10

Al-Shorta

- Iraqi Premier League: 2018–19
