= Amjad Attwan =

Iraqi footballer (born 1997)

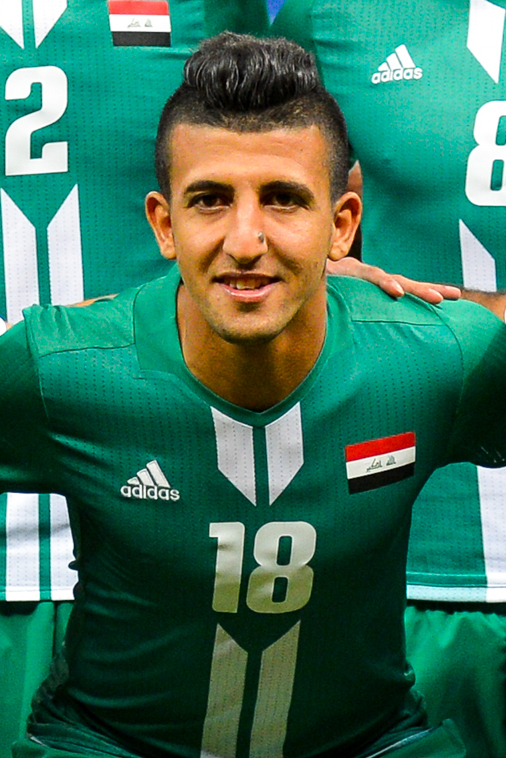
- Attwan at the 2016 Summer Olympics

Personal information
- Full name: Amjad Attwan Kadhim Al-Magsoosi
- Date of birth: 12 March 1997 (age 29)
- Place of birth: Kut, Iraq
- Height: 1.80 m (5 ft 11 in)
- Positions: Defensive midfielder; central midfielder; attacking midfielder

Team information
- Current team: Zakho
- Number: 14

Senior career*
Years	Team	Apps	(Gls)
2013–2014	Al-Kut		
2014	Karbalaa		(1)
2014–2015	Naft Al-Wasat		(1)
2015–2016	Al-Shorta		(2)
2016–2017	Naft Al-Wasat		(1)
2017–2018	Al-Najaf		
2018–2020	Al-Shorta	36	(2)
2020	Al-Kuwait		
2020–2021	Al-Shorta	33	(12)
2021–2023	Al-Shamal	43	(7)
2023–	Zakho SC	41	(27)

International career^{‡}
2013	Iraq U17	2	(0)
2013-2014	Iraq U20	2	(1)
2015–2018	Iraq U23	5	(2)
2016–	Iraq	85	(5)
- * Club domestic league appearances and goals as of 31 August 2023 ‡ National team caps and goals as of 6 December 2025

Amjad Attwan Kadhim Al-Magsoosi (born 12 March 1997) is an Iraqi professional footballer who currently plays for Zakho in the Iraq Stars League and the Iraq national team. He can be deployed as a defensive midfielder, central midfielder or attacking midfielder.

== International debut ==
On 18 March 2016, Attwan made his first international cap for Iraq against Syria in a friendly match.

=== International goals ===
Scores and results list Iraq's goal tally first.

List	Date	Venue	Opponent	Score	Result	Competition
1.	15 October 2019	Olympic Stadium, Phnom Penh, Cambodia	Cambodia	3–0	4–0	2022 FIFA World Cup qualification
2.	12 January 2023	Basra International Stadium, Basra	Yemen	2–0	5–0	25th Arabian Gulf Cup
3.	19 January 2023	Basra International Stadium, Basra	Oman	2–1	3–2 (a.e.t.)	25th Arabian Gulf Cup
4.	10 September 2023	700th Anniversary Stadium, Chiang Mai	Thailand	2–1	2–2 (5–4 p)	2023 King's Cup
5.	6 December 2025	Stadium 974, Doha, Qatar	Sudan	2–0	2–0	2025 FIFA Arab Cup

== Style of play ==
Attwan is a career dedicated player. He is known for breaking down opposition plays due to his positional sense, defensive attributes, tactical awareness and ability to read the game with high technique.

== Zakho SC ==
Amjad Attwan joined Zakho SC during the winter transfer period of 2024 and quickly established himself as the team's captain. He is regarded as one of the most important players in the squad. A midfielder with a goal-scoring ability—netting 20 goals over the past two seasons.

== Honours ==
Naft Al-Wasat

- Iraqi Premier League: 2014–15

Al-Shorta

- Iraqi Premier League: 2018–19
- Iraqi Super Cup: 2019

Al-Kuwait

- Kuwaiti Premier League: 2019–20
- Kuwait Crown Prince Cup: 2019–20

Iraq

- Arabian Gulf Cup: 2023
