= Papa Koami Awounyo =

Togolese footballer

Koami Awounyo
Personal information
- Full name: Papa Koami Awounyo
- Date of birth: August 3, 1991 (age 35)
- Place of birth: Togo
- Height: 1.76 m (5 ft 9 in)
- Position: Defender

Team information
- Current team: Al-Karkh
- Number: 34

Youth career
- –2008: US Masséda

Senior career*
Years	Team	Apps	(Gls)
2008−2010	US Masséda		
2010−2012	AS Marsa		
2012−2014	Al-Mesaimeer		
2014−2015	Al-Karkh		
2015−2016	Al-Shorta		
2015−2016	→ Al-Karkh (loan)		
2016−2018	Naft Al-Junoob		
2018−2020	Al-Najaf		
2020−	→ Al-Karkh		

International career
2007−2008	Togo U17	3	(0)
- * Club domestic league appearances and goals

Papa Koami Awounyo or simply Baba Moussa (born August 3, 1991) is a Togolese footballer, who plays for Iraqi club Al-Karkh.

== Career ==
Aloenouvo began his career in the youth from US Masséda, was in 2008 promoted to the first team. He played at the 2008 CAF Confederations Cup against the Beninese side UNB.

Awounyo played with the Togo under-17 national team at 2007 FIFA U-17 World Cup in South Korea.
