= Haidar Raad =

Iraqi footballer

Personal information
- Full name: Haidar Raad Majeed
- Date of birth: 27 April 1991 (age 35)
- Place of birth: Baghdad, Iraq
- Height: 1.86 m (6 ft 1 in)
- Position: Goalkeeper

Team information
- Current team: Duhok SC

Senior career*
Years	Team	Apps	(Gls)
2010–2011	Al Kahraba		
2011–2012	Al-Karkh SC		
2012–2014	Duhok SC		
2014–2015	Al-Naft SC		
2015–2016	Al-Shorta SC		
2016–2017	Naft Al-Junoob SC		
2017–2018	Duhok SC		
2018	Al-Quwa Al-Jawiya		
2018–	Al-Najaf FC		

International career
2010–	Iraq	1	(0)
- * Club domestic league appearances and goals

Haidar Raad Majeed (Arabic: حيدر رعد; born 27 April 1991 in Baghdad, Iraq) is an Iraqi football goalkeeper who currently plays for the Iraq national football team. He has been called for the Iraq National team by Wolfgang Sidka.
