= Nebojša Jovović =

Montenegrin footballer and manager

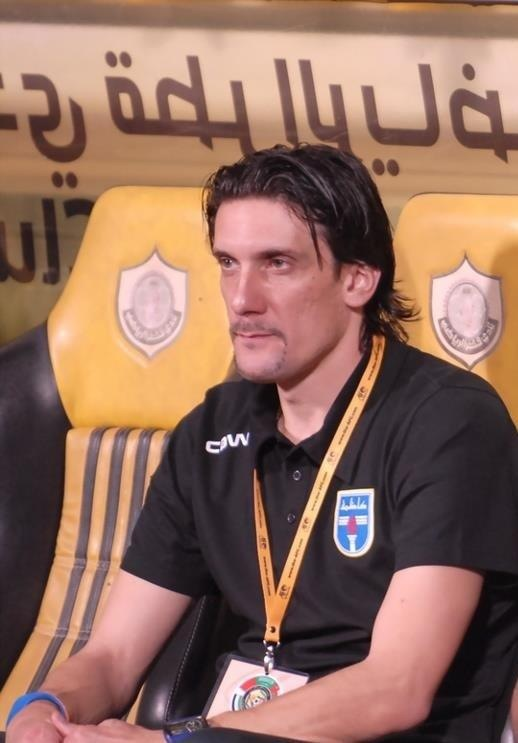
- Jovović in 2014

Personal information
- Date of birth: 28 August 1974 (age 52)
- Place of birth: Titograd, SFR Yugoslavia
- Height: 1.86 m (6 ft 1 in)
- Position: Forward

Youth career
- 1986–1987: Crvena Stijena
- 1987–1995: Budućnost Podgorica

Senior career*
Years	Team	Apps	(Gls)
1995–1997	Budućnost Podgorica	33	(3)
1998	Kayserispor	7	(1)
1998–2001	Sartid Smederevo		
2001	Slavia Mozyr	5	(3)
2002	Assyriska	4	(0)
2002	Zeta		
2003	Henan Jianye		
2003–2004	Zagłębie Lubin		

Managerial career
- 2007–2008: Ribnica
- 2008–2010: Montenegro U19
- 2010–2011: Kom
- 2012–2013: Kazma (assistant)
- 2014: Berane
- 2014–2015: Hajer
- 2016–2017: Sutjeska Nikšić
- 2017: Al-Faisaly Amman
- 2017–2018: Zamalek
- 2018: Al-Faisaly Amman
- 2018–2019: Al-Shorta
- 2019: CS Sfaxien
- 2019–2023: Al-Ahli Doha
- 2023–2024: Khor Fakkan
- 2024–2026: Kuwait SC
- * Club domestic league appearances and goals

Nebojša Jovović (Montenegrin Cyrillic: Небојша Јововић, born 28 August 1974) is a Montenegrin professional football manager and former player who played as a striker.

== Playing career ==
Born in Titograd, after starting at youth team of local Crvena Stijena, Jovović signed with FK Budućnost Podgorica in 1988. He played 10 years in total at Budućnost. In 1998, he had a spell abroad at Turkish side Kayserispor, after which he returned and played three more seasons in the First League of FR Yugoslavia with Sartid Smederevo.

In 2001, he played with Slavia Mozyr in Belarus, in 2002 he played with Swedish side Assyriska FF and Montenegrin FK Zeta, 2003 with Chinese Henan Jianye, and, finally, in 2004 with Polish Zagłębie Lubin.

== Coaching career ==
On 23 March 2017, Jovović was appointed head coach of Al-Faisaly Amman. Later that year, on 28 August, he was named as Egyptian Professional League side Al-Zamalek.

On 1 January 2018, Jovović returned to Al-Faisaly Amman. On 13 August 2018, he became the head coach of Al-Shorta. On 15 July 2019, Jovović became the head coach of CS Sfaxien. On 1 December 2019, he became the head coach of Al Ahli SC (Doha).

== Managerial statistics ==
As of 24 December 2023

Team	Nat	From	To	Record				
Team	Nat	From	To	G	W	D	L	Win %
Berane	(Montenegro)	1 January 2014	10 June 2014	18	9	3	6	50.00
Hajer	(Saudi Arabia)	10 October 2014	5 November 2015	36	9	7	20	25.00
Sutjeska	(Montenegro)	11 June 2016	28 February 2017	24	9	9	6	37.50
Al-Faisaly	(Jordan)	25 March 2017	27 August 2017	19	14	3	2	73.68
Zamalek	(Egypt)	27 August 2017	3 January 2018	21	12	5	4	57.14
Al-Faisaly	(Jordan)	6 January 2018	15 May 2018	20	11	3	6	55.00
Al-Shorta	(Iraq)	27 July 2018	14 July 2019	41	28	10	3	68.29
Sfaxien	(Tunisia)	15 July 2019	5 October 2019	7	4	1	2	57.14
Al Ahli	(Qatar)	1 December 2019	4 September 2023	107	29	29	49	27.10
Khor Fakkan	(United Arab Emirates)	29 October 2023	30 June 2024	11	3	1	7	27.27
Total				304	128	71	105	42.11

== Honours as manager ==
Al-Faisaly (Amman)

- Jordan League: 2016–17
- Jordan FA Cup: 2016–17
- Jordan Super Cup: 2017
- Arab Club Championship: Runner-up 2017

Al-Shorta (Baghdad)

- Iraqi Premier League: 2018–19

CS Sfaxien

- Tunisian Cup: 2018–19

Kuwait SC

- Kuwait Premier League: 2024–25
- Kuwait Emir Cup: 2024–25
- Kuwait Crown Prince Cup: 2024–25
- Kuwait Super Cup: 2024–25
- AFC Challenge League: 2025–26

Individual

- Kuwait Premier League Manager of the Season: 2024–25
