= Hussam Kadhim =

Iraqi footballer

Personal information
- Full name: Hussam Kadhim Jabur Al-Shuwaili
- Date of birth: 17 October 1987 (age 39)
- Place of birth: Baghdad, Iraq
- Height: 1.74 m (5 ft 9 in)
- Position: Leftback

Team information
- Current team: Al-Kahrabaa

Senior career*
Years	Team	Apps	(Gls)
2009–2011	Naft Al-Janoob		
2011–2012	Erbil SC (loan)		
2012	Al-Quwa Al-Jawiya		
2012–2017	Al-Naft		
2017–2021	Al-Shorta		
2021–2024	Al-Zawraa		
2024–	Al-Kahraba		

International career^{‡}
2011–2019	Iraq	17	(0)
- * Club domestic league appearances and goals as of N/A ‡ National team caps and goals as of 24 August 2016

Hussam Kadhim Jabur Al-Shuwaili (Arabic: حسام كاظم جبور الشويلي; born 17 October 1987) is an Iraqi association football player who plays as a left back for Al-Kahrabaa in Iraq.

== Honours ==
=== Club ===
Al-Shorta

- 2018–19 Iraqi Premier League winner
- 2019 Iraqi Super Cup winner

Al-Zawraa

- 2021 Iraqi Super Cup winner

=== Country ===
Iraq National football team

- 2012 Arab Nations Cup Bronze medallist

=== Individual ===
- 15/16 IPL Left Back of the season
