= Mohammed Hameed Farhan =

Iraqi footballer

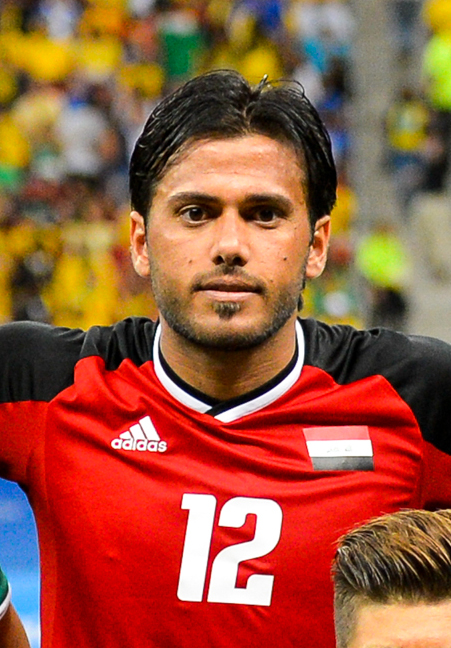

Personal information
- Full name: Mohammed Hameed Farhan Al-Dulaymi
- Date of birth: 24 January 1993 (age 33)
- Place of birth: Fallujah, Al-Anbar, Iraq
- Height: 1.85 m (6 ft 1 in)
- Position: Goalkeeper

Team information
- Current team: Al-Jolan

Youth career
- 2006–2007: Al-Ramadi

Senior career*
Years	Team	Apps	(Gls)
2007–2009	Al-Ramadi	7	(0)
2009–2011	Al-Kahrabaa	51	(0)
2011–2015	Al-Shorta	73	(0)
2015	Zakho	6	(0)
2015–2016	Al-Talaba		(0)
2016–2017	Naft Al-Wasat		(0)
2017–2021	Al-Shorta		(0)
2021	Al-Naft		(0)
2022	Al-Kahrabaa		(0)
2022–2024	Al-Quwa Al-Jawiya		(0)
2024–2026	Al-Karma	11	(0)
2026–	Al-Jolan		

International career^{‡}
2009–2013	Iraq U20	18	(0)
2014–2016	Iraq U23	10	(0)
2013–	Iraq	37	(0)
- * Club domestic league appearances and goals as of 21/5/24 @ 15;14(AEST) ‡ National team caps and goals as of 18 March 2022

Mohammed Hameed Farhan Al-Dulaimi (Arabic: مُحَمَّد حَمِيد فَرْحَان الدُّلَيْمِيّ; born 24 January 1993) is an Iraqi footballer who plays as a goalkeeper for Iraq Stars League club Al-Jolan and the Iraq national team. He was the team captain in the 2013 FIFA U-20 World Cup.

== Club career ==
The goalkeeper comes from the Albu Soudah area in the western province of Al-Anbar, Iraq. He first started on the dusty grounds of the Thilth or third playground in his home town playing for the shaabiya team Al-Karma under the coach and school headmaster Mohammed Khalaf Salim before he made his name with Iraqi league club Al-Ramadi and then moving onto the city of Baghdad to play for Al-Kahrabaa in 2009 when he was 16 years of age.

He signed for Al-Kahrabaa in 2009 and remained for two seasons until he left in 2011 towards Al-Shorta, where he first earned a call up to the Iraqi national team. Farhan won the league with Al-Shorta before moving to Zakho.

Mohammed was the country's number one keeper in 2014. The ex-Iraqi youth captain was regarded as one of Iraq's best keepers but had to rebuild his career after goalkeeping mistakes against Saudi Arabia during the 2015 Asian Cup qualifying campaign and a calamitous error in an AFC Cup tie in the West Bank saw him dropped by the Iraqi FA and released by Al-Shorta!

Farhan signed for Zakho on July 15, 2015. He played the first half of the 2015/16 season with Zakho. He was one of 18 players signed by Zakho at the start of 2015–2016 season, with his contracted ratified by the Iraqi FA on August 24, 2015 however after just two months and 26 days later, he left the Duhok-based club by mutual consent after wanting to move to Al-Talaba in the winter transfer window. However, because of contractual issues, the keeper was unable to sign for the Students and spent the rest of the season without a club! But was selected for the 2016 Olympic Games in Brazil.

He returned to Al-Shorta on February 1.

== International career ==
He made his unofficial international debut in a training game against Malaysia in Ajman in 2013. On 8 October 2013 Farhan made his full international debut against Lebanon national football team in Saida Municipal Stadium in Beirut, Lebanon. He was substituted-in replacing Noor Sabri in the 46th minute. The match ended 1–1.

Following the 2016 Olympic games, Farhan reunited with Olympic coach Abdul Ghani Shahad and signed for Naft Al-Wasat ahead of the 2016/17 season. He only stayed for half a season before being on the move once again. There have been persistent rumours behind the scenes that the Iraqi coach had only selected players for the final Olympic squad based on agreeing to sign for Naft Al-Wasat where Abdul Ghani Shahad would manage the following season, with Mohammed Hamed one of those players.

== Honours ==
=== Clubs ===
Al-Shorta

- Iraqi Premier League: 2012–13, 2018–19
- Iraqi Super Cup: 2019

Al-Quwa Al-Jawiya

- Iraq FA Cup: 2022–23

=== International ===
Iraq Youth

- AFC U-19 Championship runner-up: 2012
- FIFA U-20 World Cup fourth-place: 2013

Iraq

- Arab Nations Cup bronze medallist: 2012
- WAFF Championship runner-up: 2012
- Arabian Gulf Cup runner-up: 2013
- AFC Asian Cup fourth-place: 2015
