= Al-Diwaniya Stadium =

Stadium in Iraq

Al-Diwaniya Stadium ملعب الديوانية
- Local Administration Stadium ملعب الادارة المحلية
- Interactive map of Al-Diwaniya Stadium ملعب الديوانية
- Location: Al Diwaniyah, Iraq
- Coordinates: 31.99552°N 44.89527°E
- Owner: Al-Diwaniya FC
- Capacity: 5,000

Tenant
- Al-Diwaniya FC

Al-Diwaniya Stadium (Arabic: ملعب الديوانية) is a multi-use stadium in Al Diwaniyah, Iraq. It is currently used mostly for football matches and is the home stadium of Al-Diwaniya FC. The stadium holds 5,000 spectators.

== See also ==
- List of football stadiums in Iraq
