= Mahdi Kamil =

Iraqi footballer (born 1995)

Personal information
- Full name: Mahdi Kamil Shiltagh
- Date of birth: 6 January 1995 (age 31)
- Place of birth: Baghdad, Iraq
- Height: 1.75 m (5 ft 9 in)
- Position: Midfielder

Team information
- Current team: Newroz

Youth career
- 2005–2010: Al-Quwa Al-Jawiya
- 2010–2011: Al-Shorta

Senior career*
Years	Team	Apps	(Gls)
2011–2019	Al-Shorta		
2019–2022	Al-Zawraa	26	(3)
2022–2023	Al-Najaf		
2023–2025	Al-Talaba		
2025–2026	Zakho		
2026–	Newroz		

International career^{‡}
2011–2013	Iraq U-20	16	(3)
2012–2016	Iraq U-23	28	(3)
2013–2019	Iraq	40	(3)
Medal record
Men's football
Representing Iraq
Asian Games
Bronze medal – third place	2014 Incheon	Team
AFC U-22 Championship
First place	2013 AFC U-22 Championship	Team
- * Club domestic league appearances and goals ‡ National team caps and goals as of 8 May 2018

Mahdi Kamil Shiltagh (Arabic: مَهْدِيّ كَامِل شِلْتَاغ; born 6 January 1995) is an Iraqi professional football midfielder who plays for Newroz and the Iraq national football team.

== Early career ==
The midfielder comes from a sporting background with his elder brother having been played at Al-Jaish while his three cousins Mohanad, Adnan and Ahmed Nassir were also footballers, Mohanad Nassir going onto play for Iraq's youth team and once played against Brazil. In 2007, Ahmed Nassir then of Al-Sinaa was hurt in a twin suicide bombing that took the lives of 80 Iraqis at the Al-Shourjah market in the city of Baghdad and his playing career was ended after his leg amputated from the hip down. His cousin Mohanad Nassir played against Brazil at the 2001 FIFA World Youth Championship in Argentina. Mahdi began kicking a ball around his local shaabiya field for his local team Anwar Baghdad in Qataa (sector) 5 in Al-Sadr City, people would often tell him that he should try out for a club. The youngster who brushed away their calls but after one local game that changed when a team-mate of his decided to take it upon himself to take him to Al-Quwa Al-Jawiya for try-outs. His team-mate took him to the Air Force Club and Mahdi was picked after trials and won a title with the Al-Quwa Al-Jawiya Ishbal (“Cubs”) under Bashar Latif and Sami Shabib and progressed to the Under 17s under the supervision of Mohammed Nassir.

At 1.64 m (5ft 4 1/2 inches), Mahdi always had his doubters even when he was called to the Under 17s, however the player the Al-Shorta fans call "Zola" after the tiny ex-Italy and Chelsea FC playmaker Gianfranco Zola, showed that he was more than capable of imposing himself on opponents in the Iraqi league despite his slight frame and lack of height. That belief in his own abilities, may come from his long-admiration for Catalan giants Barcelona and their brand of tiki-taka football, a style more reliant on passing and skill than on strength. A Barça fan and an admirer of Andrés Iniesta who the Iraqi player calls a painter with the ball seemingly stuck to his feet and insists the Barcelona maestro does not merely kick a ball but cresses it, much like an artist's brush on a flat canvas and sees him on a completely different wavelength as a footballer even to Lionel Messi. Perfecting his own ball skills, Mahdi would spend hours observing Barcelona's No.8 and admitted he studied and learned how to pirouette on the ball from the Spanish genius.

== Al-Shorta ==
With limited playing time at Al-Quwa Al-Jawiya, Mahdi decided it was time to move on and signed for Al-Shurta after he impressed officials Mohammed Khalaf and one of the club's coach Adnan Jafar. However, despite signing his first senior contract he never got a game and was placed in the youth team until coach Basim Qasim was appointed and Mahdi eventually made his full league debut. The player was forced to sit impatiently on the bench early on in his career, Mahdi often thought of quitting football, however his own mother advised him to be patient and it was the making of the midfielder, understanding that the coach needed him at specific moments in matches, to a change a game.

== International career ==
On 14 August 2013 Mahdi made his first international cap with Iraq against Chile in a friendly match.

== Honors ==
=== Clubs ===
Al-Shorta

- Iraqi Premier League: 2012–13, 2018–19

Al-Zawraa

- Iraqi Super Cup: 2021

=== International ===
Iraq U-20

- AFC U-19 Championship runner-up: 2012
- FIFA U-20 World Cup 4th Place: 2013

Iraq U-23

- 2014 AFC U-22 Championship: Champions

Iraq

- AFC Asian Cup fourth-place: 2015

== International statistics ==
=== Iraq national team goals ===
Scores and results list Iraq's goal tally first.

#	Date	Venue	Opponent	Score	Result	Competition
1.	24 March 2016	Shahid Dastgerdi Stadium, Tehran	Thailand	1–1	2–2	2018 FIFA World Cup qualification
2.	13 June 2017	Shahid Dastgerdi Stadium, Tehran	Japan	1–1	1–1	2018 FIFA World Cup qualification
3.	29 December 2017	Al Kuwait Sports Club Stadium, Kuwait City	Yemen	3–0	3–0	23rd Arabian Gulf Cup
