= Alassane Diallo (Senegalese footballer) =

Senegalese footballer

Personal information
- Full name: Alassane Diallo
- Date of birth: 17 April 1989 (age 37)
- Place of birth: Dakar, Senegal
- Height: 1.85 m (6 ft 1 in)
- Position: Forward

Team information
- Current team: Al-Shorta
- Number: 33

Senior career*
| Years | Team | Apps | (Gls) |
| –2012 | US Gorée | | |
| 2012–2014 | MAS Fez | 26 | (0) |
| 2015–2016 | Al-Faisaly | | (11) |
| 2016 | → Emirates (loan) | 11 | (7) |
| 2016–2017 | Al-Shaab | | |
| 2017–2018 | Dibba Al-Fujairah | 11 | (3) |
| 2018–2019 | Al-Shorta | 33 | (11) |
- * Club domestic league appearances and goals

Alassane Diallo (born 17 April 1989) is a Senegalese footballer who plays as a forward, most recently for Al-Shorta in the Iraqi Premier League.

== Honours ==
=== Club ===
Al-Shorta

- Iraqi Premier League: 2018–19
