= Ammar Abdul-Hussein =

Iraqi footballer (born 1993)

Ammar Abdul-Hussein Al-Asadi
Personal information
- Date of birth: 13 February 1993 (age 33)
- Place of birth: Basra, Iraq
- Height: 1.82 m (6 ft 0 in)
- Position: Left winger

Youth career
- Kahrabaa Al-Hartha
- 2007–2008: Al-Bahri

Senior career*
Years	Team	Apps	(Gls)
2008–2012	Al-Minaa	79	(8)
2008	→ Najaf FC (loan)	2	
2008	→ Al-Shorta (loan)	2	
2012–2013	Erbil SC		(0)
2013–2015	Al-Shorta		(1)
2015–2017	Al-Minaa	58	(6)
2017–2019	Al-Shorta		
2019–2020	Al-Naft		
2020–2021	Al-Zawraa		
2021	Al-Minaa		
2021–2022	Zakho		
2022	Naft Maysan		
2022–2023	Duhok		
2023–2024	Newroz		

International career
2011–2013	Iraq U20	11	(1)
2011–2012	Iraq U23	8	(2)
2012	Iraq	2	(0)
- * Club domestic league appearances and goals

Ammar Abdul-Hussein Ahmad Al-Asadi (Arabic: عَمَّار عَبْد الْحُسَيْن أَحْمَد الْأَسَدِيّ; born 13 February 1993) is an Iraqi professional footballer who last played as a winger for Iraqi Premier League club Newroz.

== International debut ==
On December 3, 2012, Ammar made his full international debut against Bahrain in a friendly match, which the match was ended 0–0.

== Style of play ==
Ammar Abdul-Hussein is a skilled dribbler and static playmaker who can possess the ball and drive the team forward.

== International statistics ==
=== Iraq national under-20 team goals ===
Goals are correct excluding friendly matches and unrecognized tournaments such as Arab U-20 Championship.

Ammar Abdul-Hussein Al-Asadi – goals for Iraq Youth Team
#	Date	Venue	Opponent	Score	Result	Competition
1	June 26, 2013	Akdeniz University Stadium, Antalya, Turkey	Egypt	1–1	2-1	2013 FIFA U-20 World Cup

=== Iraq national under-23 team goals ===
Goals are correct excluding friendly matches.

Ammar Abdul-Hussein Al-Asadi – goals for Iraq Olympic Team
#	Date	Venue	Opponent	Score	Result	Competition
1	June 25, 2012	Royal Oman Police Stadium, Muscat, Oman	India	2–0	2–1	2013 AFC U-22 Asian Cup qual.
2	June 28, 2012	Sultan Qaboos Sports Complex, Muscat, Oman	Lebanon	2–1	5–1	2013 AFC U-22 Asian Cup qual.

== Honours ==
Erbil

- 2011–12 Iraqi Premier League: Champion
- 2012 AFC Cup runner-up

Al Shorta

- 2018–19 Iraqi Premier League champion

Iraq U20

- 2012 AFC U-19 Championship: runner-up
- 2013 FIFA U-20 World Cup: fourth place

Iraq

- 2012 WAFF Championship: runner-up
