= Karrar Mohammed =

Iraqi footballer

Personal information
- Full name: Karrar Mohammed Mohaiseen; Al Zuhair
- Date of birth: 6 March 1989 (age 37)
- Place of birth: Basra, Iraq
- Height: 1.87 m (6 ft 2 in)
- Position: Centre back

Team information
- Current team: Al-Minaa
- Number: 2

Youth career
- 2007–2008: Al-Minaa

Senior career*
Years	Team	Apps	(Gls)
2008–2009	Al-Bahri		
2009–2012	Naft Al-Janoob		
2012–2013	Al-Hindiya		
2013–2014	Al-Najaf		
2014–2015	Al-Shorta		
2015–2017	Al-Zawraa		
2017–2020	Al-Shorta		
2020–2021	Amanat Baghdad		
2021–	Al-Minaa		

International career^{‡}
2016–2018	Iraq	2	(0)
- * Club domestic league appearances and goals as of 24 July 2016 ‡ National team caps and goals as of 24 August 2016

Karrar Mohammed Mohaiseen Al Zuhair (Arabic: كَرَّار مُحَمَّد مُحَيْسِن الزُّهَيْر; born 6 March 1989) is an Iraqi footballer who last played as a centre back for Al-Minaa in the Iraq Premier League, as well as the Iraq national team.

== International career ==
On 24 July 2016, Karrar made his first international cap with Iraq against Uzbekistan in a friendly match.

== Honours ==
=== Club ===
Al-Zawraa

- Iraqi Premier League: 2015–16
- Iraq FA Cup: 2016–17

Al-Shorta

- Iraqi Premier League: 2018–19
