= Maysan Olympic Stadium =

Stadium in Maysan, Iraq

Coordinates: 31.835328°N 47.126977°E

Maysan Olympic Stadium ملعب ميسان الأولمبي
- Interactive map of Maysan Olympic Stadium ملعب ميسان الأولمبي
- Full name: Maysan Olympic Stadium
- Location: Amarah, Maysan, Iraq
- Owner: Ministry of Youth and Sports (Iraq)
- Capacity: 25,000
- Surface: Grass
- Field size: 105 by 68 metres (115 by 74 yd)

Construction
- Opened: 1987
- Renovated: 2011 - 2017

Tenants
- Naft Maysan; Maysan FC

Maysan Olympic Stadium (Arabic: ملعب ميسان الأولمبي) is a multi-use stadium in Amarah, Iraq. The stadium holds 25,000 people and was opened in 1987.

== Renovation ==
Plans were made to renovate the stadium after 2003, but work began only in 2011. The project included rehabilitating the VIP area, the pitch, installing 25,000 seats, a new running track, a roof over the entire stadium and other facilities within the stadium compound.

Renovation work soon stopped due to lack of money. Work restarted in 2016, and the stadium was officially re-opened on 22 July 2017, although the roof has not yet been completed.

== Tenant ==
Naft Maysan play most of their home games at this stadium.

== See also ==
- List of football stadiums in Iraq
