= Amanat Baghdad Stadium =

Stadium in Iraq

- ملعب أمانة بغداد
- Interactive map of Amanat Baghdad Stadium
- Location: Baghdad, Iraq
- Coordinates: 33°18′53.9″N 44°23′04.1″E
- Owner: Mayoralty of Baghdad
- Capacity: 5,000
- Surface: Grass
- Field size: 105 by 68 metres (114.8 yd × 74.4 yd)

Construction
- Opened: 3 December 2010

Tenant
- Amanat Baghdad SC (2010–)

Amanat Baghdad Stadium (Arabic: ملعب أمانة بغداد) is a football stadium in Baghdad, Iraq. It is currently used mostly for football matches and is the home stadium of Amanat Baghdad SC. It has a capacity of 5,000 spectators.

== See also ==
- List of football stadiums in Iraq
