= 2018–19 Iraqi Premier League =

Iraqi Premier League
- Season: 2018–19
- Dates: 14 September 2018 – 24 July 2019
- Champions: Al-Shorta (4th title)
- Relegated: Al-Bahri; Al-Hussein
- 2020 AFC Champions League: Al-Shorta; Al-Zawraa
- 2019–20 Arab Club Champions Cup: Al-Shorta; Al-Quwa Al-Jawiya; Al-Zawraa
- 2021 AFC Champions League: Al-Shorta; Al-Zawraa; Al-Quwa Al-Jawiya
- Matches: 380
- Goals: 848 (2.23 per match)
- Top goalscorer: Alaa Abdul-Zahra (28 goals)
- Biggest home win: Al-Zawraa 5–0 Al-Talaba (2 June 2019)
- Biggest away win: Al-Diwaniya 1–7 Al-Shorta (7 December 2018)
- Highest scoring: Al-Diwaniya 1–7 Al-Shorta (7 December 2018); Al-Hudood 3–5 Al-Karkh (15 February 2019); Al-Shorta 5–3 Al-Kahrabaa (10 May 2019)
- Longest winning run: 6 games Al-Quwa Al-Jawiya; Al-Shorta
- Longest unbeaten run: 27 games Al-Shorta
- Longest winless run: 16 games Al-Bahri
- Longest losing run: 5 games Al-Samawa

The 2018–19 Iraqi Premier League (Arabic: الدوري العراقي الممتاز 2018–19) was the 45th season of the Iraqi Premier League, the highest division for Iraqi association football clubs, since its establishment in 1974. The season started on 14 September 2018 and ended on 24 July 2019.

A two-horse title race ensued for most of the season and Al-Shorta ended up as champions by finishing five points ahead of Al-Quwa Al-Jawiya at the top of the table. During this season, Al-Shorta managed to equal the record of 39 consecutive Iraqi Premier League matches undefeated set by Al-Zawraa in 1994. The club's manager Nebojša Jovović became the first manager from Europe to win the Iraqi Premier League title.

== Teams ==
Team	Location	Stadium	Capacity
Al-Bahri	Basra	Al-Fayhaa Stadium	10,000
Al-Diwaniya	Diwaniya	Al-Diwaniya Stadium	5,000
Al-Hudood	Baghdad	Al-Taji Stadium	5,000
Al-Hussein	Baghdad	Five Thousand Stadium	5,000
Al-Kahrabaa	Baghdad	Al-Taji Stadium	5,000
Al-Karkh	Baghdad	Al-Karkh Stadium	5,150
Al-Minaa	Basra	Al-Fayhaa Stadium	10,000
Al-Naft	Baghdad	Al-Sinaa Stadium	10,000
Al-Najaf	Najaf	Al-Najaf International Stadium	30,000
Al-Quwa Al-Jawiya	Baghdad	Al-Shaab Stadium	34,200
Al-Samawa	Samawa	Al-Samawa Stadium	5,000
Al-Shorta	Baghdad	Al-Shaab Stadium	34,200
Al-Sinaat Al-Kahrabaiya	Baghdad	Al-Taji Stadium	5,000
Al-Talaba	Baghdad	Al-Shaab Stadium	34,200
Al-Zawraa	Baghdad	Al-Shaab Stadium	34,200
Amanat Baghdad	Baghdad	Amanat Baghdad Stadium	5,000
Erbil	Erbil	Franso Hariri Stadium	25,000
Naft Al-Junoob	Basra	Al-Fayhaa Stadium	10,000
Naft Al-Wasat	Najaf	Al-Najaf International Stadium	30,000
Naft Maysan	Amara	Maysan Olympic Stadium	25,000

== League table ==
Pos	Team	Pld	W	D	L	GF	GA	GD	Pts	Qualification or relegation
1	Al-Shorta (C)	38	27	8	3	73	22	+51	89	2020 and 2021 AFC Champions League and 2019–20 Arab Club Champions Cup first round (Note: Al-Shorta qualified for both the 2020 and 2021 AFC Champions League group stages by virtue of their position as 2018–19 league champions due to the abandonment of the 2019–20 domestic season.)
2	Al-Quwa Al-Jawiya	38	25	9	4	58	27	+31	84	2021 AFC Champions League play-off round and 2019–20 Arab Club Champions Cup first round (Note: Al-Quwa Al-Jawiya qualified for the 2021 AFC Champions League play-off round by virtue of their position as 2018–19 league runners-up due to the abandonment of the 2019–20 domestic season.)
3	Al-Zawraa	38	17	14	7	57	40	+17	65	2020 AFC Champions League preliminary round 2 and 2021 play-off round and 2019–20 Arab Club Champions Cup preliminary round (Note: Al-Zawraa qualified for both the 2020 AFC Champions League preliminary round 2 and 2021 AFC Champions League play-off round by virtue of their position as 2018–19 Iraq FA Cup winners due to the abandonment of the 2019–20 domestic season.)
4	Al-Naft	38	16	15	7	60	39	+21	63	
5	Naft Maysan	38	15	14	9	57	47	+10	59	
6	Al-Karkh	38	15	12	11	44	35	+9	57	
7	Naft Al-Wasat	38	11	17	10	38	37	+1	50	
8	Amanat Baghdad	38	12	14	12	36	35	+1	50	
9	Al-Hudood	38	12	14	12	35	41	−6	50	
10	Al-Kahrabaa	38	10	18	10	41	41	0	48	
11	Erbil	38	12	12	14	34	36	−2	48	
12	Al-Najaf	38	9	17	12	41	43	−2	44	
13	Al-Talaba	38	10	14	14	47	52	−5	44	
14	Al-Diwaniya	38	9	17	12	32	43	−11	44	
15	Naft Al-Junoob	38	11	9	18	37	53	−16	42	
16	Al-Sinaat Al-Kahrabaiya	38	9	14	15	30	38	−8	41	
17	Al-Minaa	38	8	16	14	34	42	−8	40	
18	Al-Samawa	38	8	9	21	26	59	−33	33	
19	Al-Bahri (R)	38	6	11	21	39	66	−27	29	Relegation to the Iraqi First Division League
20	Al-Hussein (R)	38	5	12	21	29	52	−23	27	Relegation to the Iraqi First Division League

Source: Kooora
Rules for classification: 1) points; 2) goal difference; 3) number of goals scored.
(C) Champions; (R) Relegated

== Results ==
Home \ Away	BAH	DIW	HUD	HUS	KAH	KAR	MIN	NFT	NJF	QWJ	SMA	SHR	SNK	TLB	ZWR	AMN	ERB	NFJ	NFW	NFM
Al-Bahri		0–1	1–2	2–1	0–0	1–3	2–2	2–2	1–1	1–3	0–1	3–1	0–0	1–1	1–4	1–1	0–0	2–3	1–2	2–1
Al-Diwaniya	1–2		1–1	1–1	1–1	0–2	1–0	0–0	1–3	0–1	3–1	1–7	0–0	2–0	3–2	1–1	0–0	1–0	0–0	3–1
Al-Hudood	0–0	0–0		0–0	2–1	3–5	2–1	1–3	1–0	1–0	3–0	1–2	1–0	1–1	0–2	2–1	2–1	0–1	2–2	1–1
Al-Hussein	1–2	1–2	1–1		3–2	0–0	1–0	2–2	0–0	1–2	0–1	0–2	0–0	2–0	1–2	0–0	1–2	1–1	1–1	1–0
Al-Kahrabaa	1–0	0–0	0–0	1–1		0–1	1–1	3–3	2–2	0–1	2–0	0–2	1–1	3–2	0–1	1–0	0–1	1–1	2–1	1–2
Al-Karkh	3–1	0–1	0–1	2–0	2–2		2–1	1–1	0–2	1–3	2–1	0–0	1–0	2–1	1–0	1–1	0–1	3–0	1–1	1–0
Al-Minaa	1–2	0–0	2–0	3–2	1–2	1–1		0–0	0–0	1–1	3–0	1–0	2–2	0–0	2–1	1–1	0–0	1–0	0–0	1–1
Al-Naft	1–0	2–0	3–0	2–1	1–2	1–0	4–2		0–0	1–2	3–0	0–1	1–0	1–2	1–1	1–1	2–2	2–1	1–2	1–1
Al-Najaf	1–0	1–1	0–1	2–1	1–1	1–1	3–0	2–2		0–1	0–1	0–0	1–3	3–2	3–3	0–2	3–1	1–2	1–2	1–0
Al-Quwa Al-Jawiya	3–1	2–0	2–1	1–0	3–2	1–0	1–1	1–2	1–1		3–0	1–1	1–0	2–1	0–1	1–1	3–0	2–1	1–1	2–3
Al-Samawa	3–0	2–1	0–0	0–1	1–2	0–1	0–0	0–1	1–1	0–2		0–4	1–1	1–3	0–0	0–1	1–0	0–0	1–1	2–1
Al-Shorta	3–1	1–0	1–0	2–0	5–3	1–0	3–0	2–0	1–1	2–3	3–1		3–0	0–0	0–0	2–1	2–1	4–0	2–0	5–1
Al-Sinaat Al-Kahrabaiya	3–2	2–1	0–1	2–0	0–0	2–2	0–0	0–1	0–1	0–1	2–2	0–1		0–0	0–1	2–4	2–1	1–0	0–0	0–0
Al-Talaba	3–2	1–1	1–1	0–0	0–0	1–2	2–1	1–4	1–0	0–2	3–1	0–2	2–3		1–1	0–0	4–0	4–1	2–2	1–1
Al-Zawraa	2–1	3–3	1–1	4–1	0–2	1–1	1–0	2–2	1–0	0–1	3–0	0–0	1–0	5–0		0–1	0–0	2–1	3–3	1–1
Amanat Baghdad	0–0	0–0	1–0	4–2	0–0	1–1	2–1	1–0	1–1	0–1	1–2	1–2	0–1	0–3	1–2		2–0	1–0	0–0	1–0
Erbil	3–1	0–0	3–0	2–0	0–0	1–0	1–0	0–2	0–0	0–0	3–0	0–1	1–1	1–0	4–0	2–0		0–0	1–2	0–0
Naft Al-Junoob	1–1	1–0	0–0	2–1	0–0	0–0	1–2	1–5	3–0	1–1	2–1	1–3	2–0	1–2	1–2	1–2	2–1		1–0	2–4
Naft Al-Wasat	3–0	0–0	1–0	1–0	0–1	1–0	0–1	2–2	2–2	1–2	0–0	0–1	1–0	1–1	0–1	1–0	3–1	0–1		0–0
Naft Maysan	4–2	4–1	2–2	1–0	1–1	2–1	2–1	0–0	3–2	0–0	3–1	1–1	1–2	2–1	3–3	2–1	2–0	2–1	4–1	

Source: Goalzz
Legend: Blue = home team win; Yellow = draw; Red = away team win.

== Season statistics ==
=== Top scorers ===
Rank	Player	Club	Goals
1	(Iraq) Alaa Abdul-Zahra	Al-Shorta	28
2	(Iraq) Marwan Hussein	Al-Talaba	23
3	(Iraq) Alaa Abbas	Al-Zawraa	20
4	(Iraq) Mohanad Ali	Al-Shorta	19
4	(Iraq) Mohammed Dawood	Al-Naft	19

=== Hat-tricks ===
Player	For	Against	Result	Date
(Iraq) Mohammed Dawood	Al-Naft	Al-Minaa	4–2	4 November 2018
(Senegal) Alassane Diallo	Al-Shorta	Al-Diwaniya	7–1	7 December 2018
(Iraq) Alaa Abdul-Zahra	Al-Shorta	Al-Diwaniya	7–1	7 December 2018
(Iraq) Mohammed Dawood^{4}	Al-Naft	Naft Al-Junoob	5–1	17 December 2018
(Iraq) Marwan Hussein	Al-Talaba	Naft Al-Junoob	4–1	1 February 2019
(Iraq) Shareef Abdul-Kadhim	Al-Hudood	Al-Karkh	3–5	15 February 2019
(Iraq) Mohammed Jabbar Shokan	Al-Minaa	Al-Samawa	3–0	29 March 2019
(Iraq) Alaa Abdul-Zahra	Al-Shorta	Al-Kahrabaa	5–3	10 May 2019
(Morocco) Omar Mansouri	Al-Zawraa	Naft Al-Wasat	3–3	16 May 2019
(Iraq) Hammadi Ahmed	Al-Quwa Al-Jawiya	Al-Shorta	3–2	23 May 2019
(Iraq) Alaa Abbas	Al-Zawraa	Al-Talaba	5–0	2 June 2019
(Iraq) Farhan Shakor	Al-Naft	Al-Talaba	4–1	16 June 2019

Notes

^{4} Player scored 4 goals

== Awards ==
Award	Winner	Club
Soccer Iraq Goal of the Season	(Iraq) Mohanad Ali	Al-Shorta

== See also ==
- 2018–19 Iraq FA Cup
