= Al-Diwaniya SC =

Iraqi football club

Al-Diwaniya
- Full name: Al-Diwaniya Sport Club
- Founded: 1965; 61 years ago
- Ground: Al-Diwaniya Stadium
- Capacity: 5,000
- Chairman: Hussein AlAnkoshei
- Manager: Samer Saeed
- League: Iraqi Third Division League
- Website: https://diwaniyasc.store/index.html
Home colours	Away colours	Third colours

Al-Diwaniya Sport Club (Arabic: نادي الديوانية الرياضي) is a football club based in Al Diwaniyah, Al-Qādisiyyah, Iraq, the club was formed in 1965 and plays at the Al-Diwaniya Stadium. It currently competes in the Iraqi Third Division League.

== History ==
=== 1988–2018 : Ups and downs ===
The 1988–89 season, the club was playing in Iraqi Premier League for first time, it was less successful during that season, and was relegated to Iraqi First Division League at the end. But gained promotion three years later, it played in league in three seasons (1992–93, 1993–94, 1994–95), and was relegated to First Division League again, but gained promotion four years later.

The club returned to play in premier League for three more seasons (1999–2000, 2000–01, 2001–02), then relegated to First Division League for two consecutive years, and then returned to the premier League to play one season (2004–05) and then relegated at the end. Four years later, it returned and played in the premier League for two consecutive seasons (2009–10, 2010–11) then relegated and away from the premier League for six years.

In the 2016–17 season, Al-Diwaniya has achieved agreat level under the leadership of coach Qusay Munir, and became champions of the 2016–2017 Iraqi First Division League and were promoted to the 2017-18 Iraqi Premier League.

== Current squad ==
=== First-team squad ===
As of 3 September 2022

Note: Flags indicate national team as defined under FIFA eligibility rules; some limited exceptions apply. Players may hold more than one non-FIFA nationality.

No.	Pos.	Nation	Player
3	DF	IRQ	Muntadher Hussein
4	DF	IRQ	Karrar Bachai
6	MF	IRQ	Ehab Razzaq
7	MF	IRQ	Emad Abdulzahra
8	DF	IRQ	Anwar Mahdi
10	FW	IRQ	Mustafa Elameen
11	FW	IRQ	Abdullah Hamed
16	DF	IRQ	Sajjad Ahmed
17	FW	IRQ	Sajad Taleb
18	MF	IRQ	Ammar Jabbar
19	DF	IRQ	Hussein Jasim
23	MF	IRQ	Aqeel Mahdi
25	DF	IRQ	Hassan Qassim
31	GK	IRQ	Redha Abdulaziz

No.	Pos.	Nation	Player
—	DF	IRQ	Samal Saeed
—	DF	UAE	Mohammed Al-Dhahri
—	DF	BRA	Macarrao
—	DF	IRQ	Ali Hamed
—	MF	IRQ	Nadeem Kareem
—	MF	GUI	Jean Mousté
—	FW	IRQ	Bassim Ali
—	FW	IRQ	Obaida Kadhem
—	FW	IRQ	Emad Abdulhassan
—	FW	IRQ	Yousef Alaa
—	FW	IRQ	Mohammed Jumaa

== Current technical staff ==
Position	Name	Nationality
Manager:	Hamza Hadi	(Iraq)
Assistant manager:	Ibrahim Abd-Nader	(Iraq)
Assistant manager:	Haider Karim	(Iraq)
Goalkeeping coach:	Hamid Kadhim	(Iraq)
Fitness coach:	Vacant	(Iraq)
Administrative director:	Ali Aajel	(Iraq)
U-19 Manager:	Adel Hattab	(Iraq)
U-16 Manager:	Samah Hussien	(Iraq)
U-13 Manager:	Jawad Kadhim	(Iraq)
Director of football:	Hatem Shalal	(Iraq)
Administrative Coordinator:	Zakaria Yahia	(Iraq)
Director of public relations:	Ali Awadh	(Iraq)

Updated to match played 8 July 2020
Source: alsabaah.iq

== Board members ==
Position	Name	Nationality
President:	Hussien Al-Ankoshei	(Iraq)
Vice-president:	Mazin Farhan	(Iraq)
Secretary:	Haider Jaber	(Iraq)
Treasurer:	Abdul Hussein Karim	(Iraq)
Member of the Board:	Karrar Hamdallah	(Iraq)
Member of the Board:	Dhurgham Mahmoud	(Iraq)

Updated to match played 24 September 2019
Source: Mawazin.net, Alsumaria.tv

== Kit suppliers ==
Period	Kit manufacturer
2020–	Kappa

== Managerial history ==
- (Iraq) Qusay Munir (2017)
- (Iraq) Sabah Abdul Hassan (2017)
- (Iraq) Sami Bahat (2017)
- (Iraq) Nabil Zaki (2017–2018)
- (Iraq) Ahmad Kadhim (2018)
- (Iraq) Haider Yahya (2018)
- (Iraq) Samir Kadhim (2018)
- (Iraq) Ali Hashim (2018)
- (Iraq) Razzaq Farhan (2018–2019)
- (Iraq) Sadiq Saadoun (2019)
- (Iraq) Hamid Rahim (2019–2020)
- (Iraq) Hazim Saleh (2020)
- (Iraq) Saad Hafedh (2020)
- (Iraq) Qusay Munir (2020–2021)
- (Iraq) Samir Kadhim (2021)
- (Iraq) Saeed Mohsen (2021)
- (Brazil) Luciano Soares (2021)
- (Iraq) Ahmed Khalef (2021)
- (Iraq) Ahmed Rahim (2021)
- (Iraq) Haider Karim (2021)
- (Iraq) Hamza Hadi (2021–)

== Honours ==
- Iraqi Premier Division League (second tier)
  - Champions (1): 2016–17
