= 2014–15 Al-Shorta SC season =

Al Shorta
2014–15 season
- President: (Iraq) Ayad Bunyan (until 28 October) (Iraq) Jabbar Chathir Attiya (Interim) (from 16 December until 8 February) (Iraq) Riyadh Abdul-Abbas (from 8 February onwards)
- Manager: (Egypt) Mohamed Youssef (until 2 May) (Iraq) Thair Jassam (from 2 May onwards)
- Ground: Al Shaab Stadium
- Iraqi Premier League: 3rd
- AFC Cup: Round of 16
- Tournament for the Armed Forces: Semi-finals
- Top goalscorer: League: Marwan Hussein (15); All: Marwan Hussein (19)
| Home colours | Away colours |

The 2014–15 season was Al Shorta's 41st season in the Iraqi Premier League, having featured in all 41 editions of the competition. Al Shorta participated in the Iraqi Premier League and the AFC Cup.

They entered this season on the back of two successful seasons for the club. The 2012–13 season saw them win both the Baghdad Cup and the Iraqi Premier League and the 2013–14 season saw them top the Iraqi Premier League standings again.

This season was not as successful as Al Shorta finished in third place in the league. They started the season brilliantly by storming to first place in Group 2 with 40 points from a possible 48, but they were knocked out at the elite stage after replacing Egyptian coach Mohamed Youssef with former manager Thair Jassam, finishing three points behind Naft Al Wasat (who reached the final and went on to win the league) in Group 1. Al Shorta were awarded a 3–0 win over Al Minaa in the third place match as Al Minaa did not turn up to the game, so Al Shorta finished in third.

In the AFC Cup, Al Shorta topped their group, reaching the knockout stage for the first time in their history. However, they were eliminated by Al Kuwait in the round of 16.

== Squad ==
Note: Flags indicate national team as defined under FIFA eligibility rules; some limited exceptions apply. Players may hold more than one non-FIFA nationality.

| No. | Pos. | Nation | Player |
|---|---|---|---|
| 1 | GK | IRQ | Saif Jameel |
| 2 | DF | IRQ | Waleed Salem |
| 3 | DF | IRQ | Ali Bahjat |
| 4 | DF | SYR | Hamdi Al Masri |
| 5 | MF | IRQ | Hussein Abdul-Wahed (vice-captain) |
| 6 | DF | IRQ | Karrar Mohammed |
| 8 | FW | IRQ | Ammar Abdul-Hussein |
| 9 | MF | IRQ | Mahdi Kamel |
| 10 | FW | IRQ | Marwan Hussein |
| 11 | DF | IRQ | Dhirgham Ismail |
| 12 | GK | IRQ | Mohammed Gassid |
| 13 | FW | BRA | Caion |
| 14 | FW | IRQ | Amjad Kalaf (captain) |
| 16 | MF | IRQ | Haider Salim |
| 17 | FW | IRQ | Alaa Abdul-Zahra |
| 18 | MF | IRQ | Mahdi Karim |

| No. | Pos. | Nation | Player |
|---|---|---|---|
| 19 | MF | IRQ | Ahmad Ayad |
| 20 | FW | IRQ | Akram Jassim |
| 21 | GK | IRQ | Ahmed Basil |
| 22 | DF | CMR | Innocent Awoa |
| 23 | GK | IRQ | Mohammed Hameed |
| 24 | MF | IRQ | Muthana Khalid |
| 25 | MF | IRQ | Murtadha Hudaib |
| 26 | FW | IRQ | Mohanad Ali |
| 27 | MF | IRQ | Mohammed Hadi |
| 28 | MF | CMR | Makadji Boukar |
| 29 | DF | IRQ | Ahmed Fakhir |
| 31 | DF | IRQ | Salam Shakir |
| 32 | MF | IRQ | Hamza Hassan |
| 33 | MF | IRQ | Mustafa Mohsin |
| 34 | FW | IRQ | Saif Ahmed |
| — | MF | IRQ | Haider Muthanna |

=== Out on loan ===
Note: Flags indicate national team as defined under FIFA eligibility rules; some limited exceptions apply. Players may hold more than one non-FIFA nationality.

| No. | Pos. | Nation | Player |
|---|---|---|---|
| 35 | MF | IRQ | Ahmad Fadhel (at Amanat Baghdad until the end of the 2014-15 season) |

=== Departed during season ===
Note: Flags indicate national team as defined under FIFA eligibility rules; some limited exceptions apply. Players may hold more than one non-FIFA nationality.

| No. | Pos. | Nation | Player |
|---|---|---|---|
| 7 | FW | IRQ | Sherko Karim |
| 15 | MF | IRQ | Nashat Akram |

== Personnel ==
=== Technical Staff ===
| Position | Name | Nationality |
|---|---|---|
| Manager: | Thair Jassam | (Iraq) |
| Assistant manager: | Karim Nafea | (Iraq) |
| Director of football: | Hashim Ridha | (Iraq) |
| Fitness coach: | Anderson Nicolau | (Brazil) |
| Fitness coach: | Walid Juma | (Iraq) |
| Goalkeeping coach: | Ibrahim Salem | (Iraq) |
| Physiotherapist: | Tonello Marilia | (Brazil) |

=== Management ===
| Position | Name | Nationality |
|---|---|---|
| President: | Riyadh Abdul-Abbas | (Iraq) |
| Vice-president: | Mahdi Shuai | (Iraq) |
| Member of the Board: | Ali Abdul-Zahra | (Iraq) |
| Member of the Board: | Adnan Akbar Ali | (Iraq) |
| Member of the Board: | Khalid Abdul-Nabi | (Iraq) |
| Member of the Board: | Ghazi Faisal | (Iraq) |
| Member of the Board: | Faiz Abdul-Hassan | (Iraq) |
| Member of the Board: | Raad Ramadan | (Iraq) |
| Female Member of the Board: | Adara Abdul-Amir Abbas | (Iraq) |

== Kit ==
Supplier: Nike / Sponsor: Royal Arena Sport

| Home | Home alt. | Away |

== Transfers ==
=== In ===
| Date | Pos. | Name | From | Fee |
|---|---|---|---|---|
| July 2014 | DF | (Iraq) Karrar Mohammed | (Iraq) Najaf FC | - |
| July 2014 | FW | (Iraq) Marwan Hussein | (Iraq) Al Zawraa | - |
| July 2014 | MF | (Iraq) Haider Salim | (Iraq) Al Masafi | Return from loan |
| July 2014 | Manager | (Egypt) Mohamed Youssef | Free agent | - |
| July 2014 | Assistant Manager | (Iraq) Karim Nafea | Free agent | - |
| July 2014 | MF | (Iraq) Muthana Khalid | (Iraq) Arbil FC | - |
| July 2014 | GK | (Iraq) Ahmed Basil | (Iraq) Al Oloom Technology | - |
| August 2014 | GK | (Iraq) Saif Jameel | (Iraq) Najaf FC | - |
| August 2014 | MF | (Cameroon) Makadji Boukar | (Iraq) Al Quwa Al Jawiya | - |
| August 2014 | FW | (Brazil) Caion | Free agent | - |
| August 2014 | MF | (Iraq) Nashat Akram | Free agent | - |
| September 2014 | DF | (Iraq) Salam Shakir | Free agent | - |
| September 2014 | FW | (Iraq) Alaa Abdul-Zahra | Free agent | - |
| May 2015 | Manager | (Iraq) Thair Jassam | Free agent | - |
| May 2015 | Goalkeeping Coach | (Iraq) Emad Hashim | Iraq | Loan |
| June 2015 | Goalkeeping Coach | (Iraq) Ibrahim Salem | Free agent | - |

=== Out ===
| Date | Pos. | Name | To | Fee |
|---|---|---|---|---|
| June 2014 | Manager | (Brazil) Lorival Santos | | Released |
| June 2014 | FW | (Brazil) Cristiano | | Released |
| July 2014 | GK | (Iraq) Nebras Salman | | Released |
| July 2014 | GK | (Iraq) Amjed Salem | | Released |
| July 2014 | DF | (Iraq) Ahmed Hassan | | Released |
| July 2014 | MF | (Iraq) Husain Abdullah | | Released |
| July 2014 | FW | (Iraq) Mustafa Karim | (Iraq) Al Quwa Al Jawiya | - |
| July 2014 | MF | (Iraq) Qusay Munir | | Released |
| July 2014 | DF | (Iraq) Kassim Zidan | | Released |
| July 2014 | MF | (Iraq) Ahmad Fadhel | (Iraq) Amanat Baghdad | Loan |
| November 2014 | MF | (Iraq) Nashat Akram | | Released |
| February 2015 | FW | (Iraq) Sherko Karim | (Switzerland) Grasshopper Club Zürich | - |
| May 2015 | Manager | (Egypt) Mohamed Youssef | | Released |
| May 2015 | Goalkeeping Coach | (Brazil) Marquinhos Domingues | | Released |
| June 2015 | Goalkeeping Coach | (Iraq) Emad Hashim | Iraq | End of loan |
| June 2015 | DF | (Cameroon) Innocent Awoa | | Released |
| June 2015 | MF | (Cameroon) Makadji Boukar | | Released |
| June 2015 | FW | (Brazil) Caion | | Released |

== Competitions ==
=== Iraqi Premier League ===
==== Group stage (Group 2) ====
| 19 October 2014 1 | Al Shorta | 2 – 0 | Najaf FC | Baghdad |
| 12:15 GMT | Marwan Hussein 62'; Dhirgham Ismail 72' | | | Stadium: Amanat Baghdad Stadium |

| 25 October 2014 2 | Al Shorta | 1 – 0 | Al Talaba | Baghdad |
| 12:00 GMT | Alaa Abdul-Zahra 62' | | | Stadium: Al Shaab Stadium |

| 1 December 2014 3 | Al Hedood | 0 – 2 | Al Shorta | Baghdad |
| 12:00 GMT | | | Alaa Abdul-Zahra 3'; Makadji Boukar (yellow card) (yellow-red card); Dhirgham Ismail 65' | Stadium: Amanat Baghdad Stadium |

| 7 December 2014 4 | Al Shorta | 0 – 0 | Al Naft | Baghdad |
| 11:30 GMT | | | | Stadium: Al Shaab Stadium |

| 3 February 2015 5 | Al Shorta | 2 – 1 | Al Minaa | Baghdad |
| 11:30 GMT | Caion 25'; Salam Shakir 49' | | Hussein Ali Wahid 90+4' (pen.) | Stadium: Amanat Baghdad Stadium |

| 6 February 2015 6 | Amanat Baghdad | 0 – 2 | Al Shorta | Baghdad |
| 11:30 GMT | | | Dhirgham Ismail 62' (pen.); Akram Jassim 90+1' | Stadium: Amanat Baghdad Stadium |

| 10 February 2015 7 | Al Minaa | 0 – 2 | Al Shorta | Basra |
| 11:30 GMT | | | Alaa Abdul-Zahra 8'; Dhirgham Ismail 70' | Stadium: Al Mina'a Stadium |

| 14 February 2015 8 | Al Shorta | 2 – 1 | Amanat Baghdad | Baghdad |
| 12:00 GMT | Alaa Abdul-Zahra 19', 68'; Mohammed Gassid (red card) 77' | | Mohammad Fawzi 82' (pen.); Ahmad Fadhel (yellow card) (yellow-red card) 90+3' | Stadium: Amanat Baghdad Stadium |

| 19 February 2015 9 | Naft Maysan | 0 – 3 | Al Shorta | Amarah |
| 11:30 GMT | | | Mahdi Kamel 8'; Marwan Hussein 23', 37' | Stadium: Al-Maimouna Stadium |

| 1 March 2015 10 | Najaf FC | 0 – 0 | Al Shorta | Najaf |
| 11:30 GMT | | | | Stadium: An-Najaf Stadium |

| 5 March 2015 11 | Al Talaba | 1 – 2 | Al Shorta | Baghdad |
| 12:30 GMT | Ali Salah 44' | | Marwan Hussein 10', 22' | Stadium: Al Shaab Stadium |

| 4 April 2015 12 | Al Shorta | 3 – 0 | Naft Maysan | Baghdad |
| 12:30 GMT | Marwan Hussein 60'; Ammar Abdul-Hussein 83'; Akram Jassim 90' | | | Stadium: Al Shaab Stadium |

| 8 April 2015 13 | Al Shorta | 4 – 0 | Al Hedood | Baghdad |
| 12:30 GMT | Marwan Hussein 33'; Alaa Abdul-Zahra 46'; Mahdi Kamel 74'; Dhirgham Ismail 84' | | | Stadium: Al Shaab Stadium |

| 19 April 2015 14 | Duhok FC | 2 – 2 | Al Shorta | Duhok |
| 13:00 GMT | Zyad Ahmed 20'; Muhammed Zuhair 81' | | Marwan Hussein 15'; Karrar Mohammed 64' | Stadium: Duhok Stadium |

| 23 April 2015 15 | Al Naft | 2 – 2 | Al Shorta | Baghdad |
| 13:00 GMT | Mustafa Jawda 12'; Abbas Rehema 74' | | Karrar Mohammed (yellow card) 45' (yellow-red card); Alaa Abdul-Zahra (red card) 45+1'; Dhirgham Ismail 79' (pen.); Marwan Hussein 90+4' | Stadium: Al Naft Stadium |

| 5 May 2015 16 | Al Shorta | 3 – 0 (w/o) | Duhok FC | Baghdad |
| 13:00 GMT | | | | Stadium: Al Karkh Stadium |
Note: Al Shorta were awarded a 3–0 victory after Duhok FC failed to turn up for the game.

==== Elite Stage (Group 1) ====
| 17 May 2015 1 | Al Zawraa | 1 – 4 | Al Shorta | Baghdad |
| 16:00 GMT | Ashraf Abdulkarim (yellow card) 4'; Haidar Abdul-Amir 31'; Ali Raheem (yellow card) 40' | | Marwan Hussein 45+2', 62', 77'; Dhirgham Ismail 79' | Stadium: Al Shaab Stadium |

| 22 May 2015 2 | Al Shorta | 0 – 0 | Amanat Baghdad | Baghdad |
| 14:00 GMT | Hamdi Al Masri (yellow card) 90+1' (yellow-red card) | | | Stadium: Al Shaab Stadium |

| 16 June 2015 3 | Naft Al Wasat | 1 – 0 | Al Shorta | Najaf |
| 13:40 GMT | Faris Hassoun 36' | | | Stadium: An Najaf Stadium |

| 21 June 2015 4 | Al Shorta | 4 – 1 | Al Zawraa | Baghdad |
| 19:00 GMT | Dhirgham Ismail 23'; Marwan Hussein 37', 46', 49' | | Ali Saad 59' (pen.); Alaa Gatea (red card) 78' | Stadium: Al Shaab Stadium |

| 27 June 2015 5 | Amanat Baghdad | 0 – 1 | Al Shorta | Baghdad |
| 19:00 GMT | Ahmad Fadhel (yellow card) 83' (yellow-red card) | | Ahmad Ayad 4'; Waleed Salem (yellow card) 65' (yellow-red card) | Stadium: Al Shaab Stadium |

| 3 July 2015 6 | Al Shorta | 0 – 2 | Naft Al Wasat | Baghdad |
| 19:00 GMT | | | Faris Hassoun 43'; Said Mohsen 90+5' | Stadium: Al Shaab Stadium |

==== Third-place match ====
| 10 July 2015 Third-place match | Al Minaa | 0 – 3 (w/o) | Al Shorta | Baghdad |
| 19:00 GMT | | | | Stadium: Al Shaab Stadium |
Note: Al Shorta were awarded a 3–0 victory after Al Minaa failed to turn up for the game.

=== AFC Cup ===
==== Group stage ====
| Pos | Team | Pld | W | D | L | GF | GA | GD | Pts | Qualification |
|---|---|---|---|---|---|---|---|---|---|---|
| 1 | (Iraq) Al-Shorta | 6 | 2 | 3 | 1 | 14 | 7 | +7 | 9 | Advance to knockout stage |
| 2 | (Jordan) Al-Jazeera | 6 | 2 | 3 | 1 | 6 | 7 | −1 | 9 | Advance to knockout stage |
| 3 | (Palestine) Taraji Wadi Al-Nes | 6 | 1 | 3 | 2 | 6 | 11 | −5 | 6 | |
| 4 | (Bahrain) Al-Hidd | 6 | 0 | 5 | 1 | 6 | 7 | −1 | 5 | |

Source: AFC
Rules for classification: Group stage tiebreakers

| 24 February 2015 1 | Al Shorta (Iraq) | 2 – 2 | (Bahrain) Al Hidd | Doha, Qatar |
| 15:00 GMT | Waleed Salem 2' (pen.); Amjad Kalaf 13', (yellow card) 24'; Salam Shakir (yellow card) 35'; Ali Bahjat (yellow card) 67' | | Rico 28'; Mohammad Al Daoud (yellow card) 41'; Ali Bureshaid (yellow card) 44'; Jassim Ayyash 45+1' | Stadium: Grand Hamad Stadium; Attendance: 50; Referee: Marai Al Awaji (Saudi Arabia) |

| 10 March 2015 2 | Al Jazeera (Jordan) | 1 – 1 | (Iraq) Al Shorta | Amman, Jordan |
| 15:00 GMT | Jehad Al Baour (yellow card) 5'; Franco Alves 12'; Mohannad Alsouliman (yellow card) 85' | | Mahdi Karim 7' (pen.); Alaa Abdul-Zahra (yellow card) 22'; Caion (yellow card) 88' | Stadium: King Abdullah Stadium; Attendance: 700; Referee: Masoud Tufayelieh (Syria) |

| 17 March 2015 3 | Al Shorta (Iraq) | 6 – 2 | (Palestine) Taraji Wadi Al Nes | Doha, Qatar |
| 15:00 GMT | Alaa Abdul-Zahra 20', 35'; Amjad Kalaf 34'; Marwan Hussein 45+1', 90+1'; Mahdi Karim (penalty missed) 47'; Dhirgham Ismail 63' | | Fadi Zidan (yellow card) 39', (goal) 40', 86' | Stadium: Grand Hamad Stadium; Attendance: 200; Referee: Timur (Kyrgyzstan) |

| 14 April 2015 4 | Taraji Wadi Al Nes (Palestine) | 1 – 0 | (Iraq) Al Shorta | Al-Ram, Palestine |
| 14:00 GMT | Jehad Hammad (yellow card) 45+1'; Sameeh Yousef Abuhammad 83'; Hasan Abuhammad (yellow card) 85' | | Salam Shaker (yellow card) 90' | Stadium: Faisal Al-Husseini International Stadium; Attendance: 900; Referee: Yaqoob Abdul Baki (Oman) |

| 28 April 2015 5 | Al Hidd (Bahrain) | 1 – 1 | (Iraq) Al Shorta | Riffa, Bahrain |
| 15:30 GMT | Abbas Ahmed (yellow card) 51'; Ifedayo Omosuyi 77'; Hamad Rakea (yellow card) 90' | | Makadji Boukar 82'; Ali Bahjat (yellow card) 88' | Stadium: Bahrain National Stadium; Attendance: 100; Referee: Yousef Al-Marzouq (Kuwait) |

| 12 May 2015 6 | Al Shorta (Iraq) | 4 – 0 | (Jordan) Al Jazeera | Doha, Qatar |
| 15:45 GMT | Marwan Hussein 19', 53'; Hamdi Al Masri (yellow card) 42'; Caion 50'; Ahmed Nawas 76' (o.g.) | | | Stadium: Grand Hamad Stadium; Attendance: 100; Referee: Vo Minh Tri (Vietnam) |

==== Knockout phase ====
===== Round of 16 =====
| 27 May 2015 Round of 16 | Al Shorta (Iraq) | 0 – 2 | Kuwait SC | Doha, Qatar |
| 16:00 GMT | Dhirgham Ismail (yellow card) 8'; Hussein Abdul-Wahed (yellow card) 71'; Mohammed Gassid (yellow card) 79' | | Yousif Alkhebeezi (yellow card) 58'; Abdullah Al Buraiki 80' (pen.); Rogério 90+4' | Stadium: Grand Hamad Stadium; Attendance: 165; Referee: Tan Hai (China) |

=== Tournament for the Armed Forces ===
| 21 March 2015 (30-minute match) Semi-final | Al Quwa Al Jawiya | 0 – 0 (4 – 2 p) | Al Shorta | Baghdad |
| | | | | Stadium: Al Shaab Stadium |
| | Penalties |
| | Mustafa Karim (penalty scored); Ali Abdul-Jabbar (penalty scored); Haitham Kadhim (penalty scored); Hossam Malik (penalty scored) | | (penalty scored) Haider Salim; (penalty scored) Mohanad Ali; (penalty missed) Innocent Awoa; (penalty missed) Hamza Hassan |

== Basketball ==
Al Shorta won the Iraqi Basketball League for the first time since 1996 by defeating Al Karkh in the final. The first leg of the final ended in a 66–65 win, the second ended in a 75–70 loss and the final leg ended in a 90–89 win thanks to a 3-pointer right at the end of the game from DeAndre Rice.
