= 2014–15 Iraqi Premier League =

Iraqi Premier League
- Season: 2014–15
- Dates: 30 September 2014 – 11 July 2015
- Champions: Naft Al-Wasat (1st title)
- Relegated: Masafi Al-Wasat; Sulaymaniya
- AFC Cup: Naft Al-Wasat; Al-Quwa Al-Jawiya
- Matches: 188
- Goals: 385 (2.05 per match)
- Top goalscorer: Marwan Hussein (15 goals)
- Biggest home win: Al-Talaba 5–0 Al-Najaf (24 December 2014)
- Biggest away win: Al-Zawraa 0–4 Al-Quwa Al-Jawiya (28 November 2014)
- Highest scoring: Masafi Al-Wasat 4–2 Al-Zawraa (5 October 2014); Masafi Al-Wasat 2–4 Al-Karkh (10 October 2014)
- Longest winning run: 5 games Al-Shorta; Al-Zawraa; Naft Al-Junoob
- Longest unbeaten run: 18 games Al-Shorta
- Longest winless run: 10 games Masafi Al-Wasat
- Longest losing run: 4 games Al-Talaba

The 2014–15 Iraqi Premier League was the 41st season of the Iraqi Premier League since its establishment in 1974. The season started on 30 September 2014 and ended on 11 July 2015. The league was played in a group stage format for the first time since the 2010–11 season.

Newly-promoted side Naft Al-Wasat won the league in their first season in the top-flight, defeating Al-Quwa Al-Jawiya in the final 6–5 on penalties after a 0–0 draw.

== Name changes ==
- Baghdad renamed to Amanat Baghdad.

== Group stage ==
=== Group 1 ===
Pos	Team	Pld	W	D	L	GF	GA	GD	Pts	Qualification or relegation
1	Al-Quwa Al-Jawiya	18	9	6	3	20	10	+10	33	Qualified to Elite Stage
2	Al-Zawraa	18	10	3	5	21	16	+5	33	Qualified to Elite Stage
3	Naft Al-Junoob	18	9	3	6	20	17	+3	30	Qualified to Elite Stage
4	Naft Al-Wasat	18	8	4	6	16	12	+4	28	Qualified to Elite Stage
5	Al-Karkh	18	7	5	6	20	18	+2	26	
6	Erbil	18	5	10	3	21	17	+4	25	
7	Zakho	18	5	5	8	14	22	−8	20	
8	Karbala	18	4	7	7	12	18	−6	19	
9	Al-Kahrabaa	18	4	4	10	18	23	−5	16	
10	Masafi Al-Wasat	18	3	5	10	16	25	−9	14	Relegated to Iraqi First Division League

Source: Goalzz
Rules for classification: 1) points; 2) goal difference; 3) number of goals scored.

==== Results ====
Home \ Away	KAH	KAR	QWJ	ZWR	ERB	KRB	MAS	NFJ	NFW	ZAK
Al-Kahrabaa		2–1	0–1	0–1	0–1	0–0	2–0	0–1	1–2	1–1
Al-Karkh	1–0		0–0	1–0	2–2	4–1	1–0	1–0	1–0	0–0
Al-Quwa Al-Jawiya	0–3 (Note: The Al-Quwa Al-Jawiya–Al-Kahrabaa match originally ended in a 1–1 draw but was changed to a 3–0 win for Al-Kahrabaa due to rioting from Al-Quwa Al-Jawiya fans.)	2–1		1–0	1–2	1–0	0–0	1–0	2–0	3–0
Al-Zawraa	1–0	1–0	0–4		1–0	1–0	1–0	3–1	1–0	2–0
Erbil	3–2	1–1	0–0	1–1		0–0	3–1	1–1	0–0	3–1
Karbala	2–0	1–1	0–1	1–1	2–2		2–1	0–0	1–0	2–0
Masafi Al-Wasat	1–1	2–4	1–1	4–2	1–1	0–0		1–2	2–1	1–0
Naft Al-Junoob	4–1	1–0	1–0	1–4	2–1	1–0	2–1		0–1	0–1
Naft Al-Wasat	2–2	3–0	0–0	1–0	1–0	2–0	1–0	1–1		1–0
Zakho	1–3	2–1	2–2	1–1	0–0	3–0	1–0	0–2	1–0	

Source: Goalzz
Legend: Blue = home team win; Yellow = draw; Red = away team win.

=== Group 2 ===
Pos	Team	Pld	W	D	L	GF	GA	GD	Pts	Qualification or relegation
1	Al-Shorta	16	12	4	0	32	7	+25	40	Qualified to Elite Stage
2	Al-Minaa	16	7	4	5	22	18	+4	25	Qualified to Elite Stage
3	Amanat Baghdad	16	6	6	4	19	16	+3	24	Qualified to Elite Stage
4	Duhok	16	5	6	5	18	21	−3	21	Qualified to Elite Stage
5	Al-Talaba	16	4	5	7	18	18	0	17	
6	Naft Maysan	16	3	8	5	14	20	−6	17	
7	Al-Hudood	16	3	7	6	14	21	−7	16	
8	Al-Naft	16	3	6	7	15	21	−6	15	
9	Al-Najaf	16	3	6	7	10	20	−10	15	
10	Sulaymaniya (Note: Sulaymaniya withdrew from the league after four matches, with their results being annulled.)	0	0	0	0	0	0	0	0	Relegated to Iraqi First Division League

Source: Goalzz
Rules for classification: 1) points; 2) goal difference; 3) number of goals scored.

==== Results ====
Home \ Away	HUD	MIN	NFT	NJF	SHR	TLB	AMN	DUH	NFM	SUL
Al-Hudood		0–0	0–0	2–1	0–2	1–1	2–2	3–1	0–0	– (Note: Sulaymaniya's results against Al-Talaba (1–0 loss), Duhok (1–0 loss), Al-Hudood (2–0 loss) and Al-Naft (awarded as a 3–0 loss after the game was stopped at 87 minutes with the score at 2–1 to Sulaymaniya due to crowd trouble) were annulled after their withdrawal from the league.)
Al-Minaa	2–3		2–1	2–0	0–2	1–1	2–1	2–1	1–1	
Al-Naft	1–1	2–1		2–1	2–2	0–1	1–3	0–2	2–2	
Al-Najaf	1–0	2–3	1–0		0–0	0–0	0–1	2–1	0–0	
Al-Shorta	4–0	2–1	0–0	2–0		1–0	2–1	3–0 (Note: The Al-Shorta–Duhok match was awarded as a 3–0 win to Al-Shorta, as Duhok did not turn up for the game.)	3–0	
Al-Talaba	2–1	0–2	2–3	5–0	1–2		1–1	0–0	2–1	–
Amanat Baghdad	2–0	0–0	1–0	0–0	0–2	2–1		1–1	3–1	
Duhok	1–0	1–3	1–0	1–1	2–2	2–1	1–1		1–1	
Naft Maysan	1–1	1–0	1–1	1–1	0–3	1–0	2–0	1–2		
Sulaymaniya (Note: Sulaymaniya withdrew from the league after four matches, with their results being annulled.)			–					–		

Source: Goalzz
Legend: Blue = home team win; Yellow = draw; Red = away team win.

== Elite stage ==
=== Group 1 ===
Pos	Team	Pld	W	D	L	GF	GA	GD	Pts	Qualification	NFW	SHR	AMN	ZWR
1	Naft Al-Wasat	6	4	2	0	8	3	+5	14	Qualified to the Final		1–0	1–0	2–1
2	Al-Shorta	6	3	1	2	9	5	+4	10	Qualified to Third place match	0–2		0–0	4–1
3	Amanat Baghdad	6	1	3	2	3	4	−1	6		1–1	0–1		1–0
4	Al-Zawraa	6	0	2	4	5	13	−8	2		1–1	1–4	1–1	

Source: Goalzz
Rules for classification: 1) points; 2) goal difference; 3) number of goals scored.

=== Group 2 ===
Pos	Team	Pld	W	D	L	GF	GA	GD	Pts	Qualification	QWJ	MIN	NFJ	DUH
1	Al-Quwa Al-Jawiya	6	2	4	0	4	1	+3	10	Qualified to the Final		0–0	1–0	2–0
2	Al-Minaa	6	2	4	0	6	4	+2	10	Qualified to Third place match	0–0		1–0	3–2
3	Naft Al-Junoob	6	1	2	3	3	5	−2	5		1–1	1–1		1–0
4	Duhok	6	1	2	3	4	7	−3	5		0–0	1–1	1–0	

Source: Goalzz
Rules for classification: 1) points; 2) goal difference; 3) number of goals scored.

== Championship play-off ==
Team 1	Score	Team 2
Third place match
Al-Minaa	0–3 (w/o)	Al-Shorta
Final
Al-Quwa Al-Jawiya	0–0 (a.e.t.) (5–6 p.)	Naft Al-Wasat

=== Third place match ===
10 July 2015
19:00 GMT

Al-Minaa	0–3 (w/o)	Al-Shorta

Al-Shaab Stadium, Baghdad
Referee: Salam Amer

Al-Shorta were awarded a 3–0 victory as Al-Minaa did not turn up for the game.

Al-Minaa	Al-Shorta

GK	21	(Iraq) Ahmed Basil
RB	18	(Iraq) Mahdi Karim
CB	31	(Iraq) Salam Shakir
CB	6	(Iraq) Karrar Mohammed
LB	4	(Syria) Hamdi Al-Masri
CM	5	(Iraq) Hussein Abdul-Wahed (c)
CM	25	(Iraq) Murtadha Hudaib
RW	19	(Iraq) Ahmad Ayad
AM	9	(Iraq) Mahdi Kamel
LW	8	(Iraq) Ammar Abdul-Hussein
CF	10	(Iraq) Marwan Hussein
Manager:
(Iraq) Thair Jassam

Match officials

- Assistant referees:
  - Haider Abdul Hassan
  - Ahmad Sabah Qasem
- Fourth official: Ahmed Juma

Match rules

- 90 minutes.
- 30 minutes of extra-time if necessary.
- Penalty shootout if scores still level.

=== Final ===
11 July 2015
19:00 GMT

Al-Quwa Al-Jawiya	0–0 (a.e.t.)	Naft Al-Wasat
Penalties
Abdul-Jabbar (penalty scored); Karim (penalty scored); Kadhim (penalty missed); Ahmed (penalty scored); Khribin (penalty scored); Ajan (penalty scored); Natiq (penalty missed); Midani (penalty missed)	5–6	(penalty scored) Mohsen; (penalty scored) Noumi; (penalty missed) Khalaf; (penalty scored) Mohammed; (penalty scored) Abbas; (penalty scored) Jassim; (penalty missed) Sabri; (penalty scored) Haj

Al-Shaab Stadium, Baghdad
Referee: Ali Sabah Adday

Al-Quwa Al-Jawiya	Naft Al-Wasat

GK	1	(Iraq) Fahad Talib
RB	24	(Iraq) Faisal Jassim		(substituted off) 119'
CB	2	(Iraq) Samal Saeed
CB	4	(Iraq) Saad Natiq	(yellow card) 15'
LB	17	(Syria) Moayad Ajan
RM	8	(Iraq) Samer Saeed		(substituted off) 95'
CM	16	(Syria) Zaher Midani
CM	18	(Ghana) Akwetey Mensah		(substituted off) 117'
LM	30	(Syria) Omar Khribin
ST	10	(Iraq) Hammadi Ahmed (c)
ST	5	(Iraq) Mustafa Karim
Substitutions:
FW	23	(Iraq) Yassir Abdul-Mohsen		(substituted on) 95'
DF	3	(Iraq) Ali Abdul-Jabbar		(substituted on) 117'
MF	7	(Iraq) Haitham Kadhim		(substituted on) 119'
Manager:
(Iraq) Abbas Attiya

GK	25	(Iraq) Noor Sabri
RB	2	(Syria) Alaa Al Shbli		(substituted off) 119'
CB	15	(Iraq) Essam Yassin
CB	5	(Iraq) Nabeel Abbas (c)
LB	19	(Iraq) Mohammed Noumi
RM	7	(Iraq) Ameer Sabah		(substituted off) 82'
CM	6	(Iraq) Faris Hassoun		(substituted off) 70'
CM	30	(Syria) Oday Jafal		(substituted off) 98'
CM	33	(Syria) Tamer Haj
LM	11	(Iraq) Amjad Attwan
ST	20	(Iraq) Jassim Mohammed	(yellow card) 60'
Substitutions:
MF	21	(Iraq) Saeed Mohsen		(substituted on) 70'
DF	14	(Iraq) Ayad Khalaf		(substituted on) 82'
DF	12	(Iraq) Ali Kadhim		(substituted on) 98'
DF	3	(Iraq) Ali Jassim		(substituted on) 119'
Manager:
(Iraq) Abdul-Ghani Shahad

Match officials

- Assistant referees:
  - Muayad Mohammed Ali
  - Wathik Mdallal Obaid Al-Swaiedi
- Fourth official: Wathik Mohammed Al-Baag

Match rules

- 90 minutes.
- 30 minutes of extra-time if necessary.
- Penalty shootout if scores still level.

== Season statistics ==
=== Top four positions ===
Pos	Team	Pld	W	D	L	GF	GA	Qualification
1	Naft Al-Wasat	25	12	7	6	24	15	2016 AFC Cup
2	Al-Quwa Al-Jawiya	25	11	11	3	24	11	2016 AFC Cup
3	Al-Shorta	23	16	5	2	44	12	2016 AFC Cup (did not enter)
4	Al-Minaa	23	9	8	6	28	25	

=== Top scorers ===
Rank	Player	Club	Goals
1	(Iraq) Marwan Hussein	Al-Shorta	15
2	(Iraq) Hussein Ali Wahid	Al-Minaa	10
3	(Iraq) Ali Salah	Al-Talaba	8
3	(Iraq) Abdul-Qadir Tariq	Al-Karkh	8
3	(Iraq) Dhurgham Ismail	Al-Shorta	8

=== Hat-tricks ===
Player	For	Against	Result	Date
(Iraq) Ali Salah	Al-Talaba	Al-Najaf	5–0	24 December 2014
(Iraq) Marwan Hussein	Al-Shorta	Al-Zawraa	4–1	17 May 2015
(Iraq) Marwan Hussein	Al-Shorta	Al-Zawraa	4–1	21 June 2015

== See also ==
- Tournament for the Iraqi Armed Forces
