= 2016–17 Al-Shorta SC season =

Al-Shorta
2016–17 season
- President: (Iraq) Ayad Abdul-Rahman (until 5 August) (Iraq) Ayad Bunyan (from 5 August onwards)
- Manager: (Egypt) Mohamed Youssef (until 29 March) (Iraq) Nadhum Shaker (from 30 March onwards)
- Ground: Al-Shaab Stadium
- Iraqi Premier League: 3rd
- Iraq FA Cup: Round of 32
- Top goalscorer: League: Marwan Hussein (15); All: Marwan Hussein (15)
Home colours	Away colours

The 2016–17 season was Al-Shorta's 43rd season in the Iraqi Premier League, having featured in all 42 previous editions of the competition. Al-Shorta participated in the Iraqi Premier League and the Iraq FA Cup.

They entered this season having finished in a disappointing seventh place in the league in the 2015–16 season. They were much better during this season, and were still in contention for the league title on the final day of the campaign, but a loss to Al-Minaa saw them finish in third place and miss out on continental qualification. They were knocked out of the Iraq FA Cup at the Round of 32 stage, losing at home to lower division side Al-Jaish; that defeat led to the sacking of manager Mohamed Youssef in March, who was replaced by Nadhum Shaker. The former club president Ayad Bunyan was re-elected into office early in August, following his exit midway through the 2014–15 season.

== Squad ==
Note: Flags indicate national team as defined under FIFA eligibility rules; some limited exceptions apply. Players may hold more than one non-FIFA nationality.

No.	Pos.	Nation	Player
1	GK	IRQ	Ahmed Basil
3	DF	IRQ	Ali Lateef
5	MF	IRQ	Hussein Abdul-Wahed (captain)
6	MF	EGY	Ahmed Magdy
7	FW	IRQ	Jassim Mohammed
9	MF	IRQ	Mahdi Kamel
10	FW	IRQ	Marwan Hussein
11	MF	IRQ	Ahmad Ayad
12	FW	IRQ	Ali Yousif (on loan from Al-Kahrabaa)
13	MF	IRQ	Amjad Waleed
15	DF	IRQ	Essam Yassin
16	MF	IRQ	Miran Khesro

No.	Pos.	Nation	Player
17	MF	IRQ	Nabeel Sabah
18	FW	IRQ	Abdul-Qadir Tariq
19	MF	IRQ	Jawad Kadhim
20	DF	IRQ	Kosrat Baez
23	DF	IRQ	Waleed Salem (vice-captain)
24	DF	IRQ	Faisal Jassim
25	FW	BEN	Mohamed Aoudou
28	MF	IRQ	Hatem Zidan
29	FW	IRQ	Ahmed Salam
30	GK	IRQ	Mohammed Hameed
31	GK	IRQ	Sarhang Muhsin
32	DF	IRQ	Ahmed Mohammed

=== Out on loan ===
Note: Flags indicate national team as defined under FIFA eligibility rules; some limited exceptions apply. Players may hold more than one non-FIFA nationality.

No.	Pos.	Nation	Player
8	FW	IRQ	Mohanad Ali (on loan at Al-Kahrabaa until the end of the 2016–17 season)
22	GK	IRQ	Mohammed Abbas (on loan at Al-Kahrabaa until the end of the 2016–17 season)
26	FW	IRQ	Karrar Hameed (on loan at Al-Kahrabaa until the end of the 2016–17 season)
—	FW	IRQ	Rafid Muayad (on loan at Al-Karkh until the end of the 2016–17 season)

=== Departed during season ===
Note: Flags indicate national team as defined under FIFA eligibility rules; some limited exceptions apply. Players may hold more than one non-FIFA nationality.

No.	Pos.	Nation	Player
2	DF	EGY	Abdul-Hamid Sami
4	DF	SYR	Hamdi Al Masri
14	FW	IRQ	Amjad Kalaf
25	GK	IRQ	Noor Sabri

== Personnel ==
=== Technical Staff ===
Position	Name	Nationality
Manager:	Nadhum Shaker	(Iraq)
Assistant manager:	Ahmad Salah	(Iraq)
Fitness coach:	Farouq Abdul-Jassim	(Iraq)
Goalkeeping coach:	Ghanim Ibrahim	(Iraq)
Director of football:	Hashim Ridha	(Iraq)

=== Management ===
Position	Name	Nationality
President:	Ayad Bunyan	(Iraq)
Vice-president:	Abdul-Wahab Al-Taei	(Iraq)
Financial Secretary:	Uday Tariq	(Iraq)
Board Secretary	Alaa Bahar Al-Uloom	(Iraq)
Member of the Board:	Sadiq Jafar	(Iraq)
Member of the Board:	Ghazi Faisal	(Iraq)
Member of the Board:	Tahseen Al-Yassri	(Iraq)
Member of the Board:	Ali Al-Shahmani	(Iraq)
Member of the Board:	Ghalib Al-Zamili	(Iraq)
Member of the Board:	Ahsan Al-Daraji	(Iraq)

== Kit ==
Period	Home colours	Away colours	Supplier
September 2016			Uhlsport
September 2016 – November 2016			Jako
December 2016 – August 2017			Adidas

== Transfers ==
=== In ===
Date	Pos.	Name	From	Fee
June 2016	DF	(Iraq) Essam Yassin	(Iraq) Naft Al-Wasat	-
June 2016	MF	(Iraq) Amjad Waleed	(Iraq) Naft Al-Wasat	-
June 2016	GK	(Iraq) Noor Sabri	(Iraq) Naft Al-Wasat	-
June 2016	FW	(Iraq) Jassim Mohammed	(Iraq) Naft Al-Wasat	-
June 2016	GK	(Iraq) Mohammed Abbas	(Iraq) Al-Hedood	-
June 2016	MF	(Iraq) Jawad Kadhim	(Iraq) Al-Minaa	-
July 2016	FW	(Iraq) Bassam Qabel	(Iraq) Al-Quwa Al-Jawiya	-
July 2016	FW	(Iraq) Abdul-Qadir Tariq	(Iraq) Al-Talaba	-
July 2016	DF	(Iraq) Ali Lateef	(Iraq) Al-Zawraa	-
July 2016	DF	(Iraq) Faisal Jassim	(Iraq) Al-Minaa	-
August 2016	DF	(Iraq) Kosrat Baez	(Iraq) Arbil FC	-
August 2016	MF	(Egypt) Ahmed Magdy	(Egypt) Petrojet FC	Loan
August 2016	MF	(Iraq) Miran Khesro	(Iraq) Arbil FC	-
August 2016	MF	(Iraq) Hussein Abdul-Wahed	(Iraq) Al-Zawraa	-
August 2016	FW	(Iraq) Rafid Muayad	Free agent	-
August 2016	FW	(Iraq) Karrar Hameed	(Iraq) Al-Hedood	Return from loan
August 2016	DF	(Syria) Hamdi Al Masri	(Oman) Dhofar	-
August 2016	DF	(Iraq) Ahmad Ibrahim	Free agent	-
January 2017	GK	(Iraq) Sarhang Muhsin	(Iraq) Erbil	-
January 2017	DF	(Egypt) Abdul-Hamid Sami	(Egypt) Misr Lel-Makkasa	-
January 2017	FW	(Iraq) Ali Yousif	(Iraq) Al-Kahrabaa	Loan
January 2017	FW	(Benin) Mohamed Aoudou	(South Africa) Free State Stars	-
February 2017	GK	(Iraq) Mohammed Hameed	(Iraq) Naft Al-Wasat	-
February 2017	MF	(Iraq) Hatem Zidan	(Iraq) Zakho	-

=== Out ===
Date	Pos.	Name	To	Fee
May 2016	DF	(Syria) Ahmad Al Salih		Released
May 2016	DF	(Tunisia) Seifeddine Chammari		Released
May 2016	MF	(Uganda) Hassan Wasswa		Released
June 2016	MF	(Iraq) Ahmad Fadhel	(Iraq) Al-Zawraa	-
June 2016	MF	(Iraq) Ibrahim Naeem	(Iraq) Al-Quwa Al-Jawiya	-
June 2016	GK	(Iraq) Jalal Hassan	(Iraq) Naft Al-Wasat	-
June 2016	DF	(Iraq) Waleed Bahar	(Iraq) Amanat Baghdad	-
June 2016	GK	(Iraq) Haidar Raad	(Iraq) Naft Al-Junoob	-
June 2016	FW	(Iraq) Ameer Sabah	(Iraq) Al-Talaba	-
July 2016	DF	(Iraq) Ali Faez	(Turkey) Çaykur Rizespor	-
July 2016	FW	(Iraq) Ali Salah		Released
July 2016	FW	(Iraq) Hussein Karim		Released
August 2016	MF	(Iraq) Amjad Attwan	(Iraq) Naft Al-Wasat	-
August 2016	FW	(Iraq) Akram Jassim		Released
August 2016	FW	(Iraq) Mohanad Ali	(Iraq) Al-Kahrabaa	Loan
August 2016	FW	(Iraq) Bassam Qabel		Released
September 2016	DF	(Iraq) Ahmad Ibrahim	(United Arab Emirates) Emirates Club	-
January 2017	GK	(Iraq) Noor Sabri	(Iraq) Al-Minaa	-
January 2017	FW	(Iraq) Amjad Kalaf	(Iraq) Al-Zawraa	-
January 2017	DF	(Syria) Hamdi Al Masri		Released
January 2017	FW	(Iraq) Karrar Hameed	(Iraq) Al-Kahrabaa	Loan
January 2017	FW	(Iraq) Rafid Muayad	(Iraq) Al-Karkh	Loan
February 2017	GK	(Iraq) Mohammed Abbas	(Iraq) Al-Kahrabaa	Loan
April 2017	DF	(Egypt) Abdul-Hamid Sami		Released
June 2017	FW	(Benin) Mohamed Aoudou		Released
July 2017	MF	(Egypt) Ahmed Magdy	(Egypt) Petrojet FC	Return from loan

== Competitions ==
=== Iraqi Premier League ===
15 September 2016 1	Al-Talaba	1 – 1	Al-Shorta	Baghdad
15:00 GMT	Samer Saeed 45+2'		Amjad Waleed 37'	Stadium: Al-Shaab Stadium

20 September 2016 2	Al-Hussein	1 – 1	Al-Shorta	Baghdad
12:45 GMT	Haider Nino 51'		Waleed Salem 54' (pen.)	Stadium: Five Thousand Stadium

25 September 2016 3	Al-Shorta	2 – 1	Al-Bahri	Baghdad
12:30 GMT	Amjad Kalaf 32'; Jassim Mohammed 35'		82'	Stadium: Al-Shaab Stadium

20 October 2016 4	Al-Shorta	4 – 1	Al-Samawa	Baghdad
13:00 GMT	Mahdi Kamel 11'; Marwan Hussein 42', 90+2'; Jassim Mohammed 46'		Hassan Abbas 82'	Stadium: Al-Shaab Stadium

26 October 2016 5	Naft Maysan	0 – 0	Al-Shorta	Amarah
12:00 GMT				Stadium: Al-Maimouna Stadium

31 October 2016 6	Al-Shorta	4 – 0	Al-Karkh	Baghdad
13:00 GMT	Amjad Waleed 28'; Amjad Kalaf 43', 51'; Abdul-Qadir Tariq 68' (pen.)			Stadium: Al-Shaab Stadium

26 November 2016 7	Al-Shorta	3 – 2	Al-Hedood	Baghdad
13:00 GMT	Marwan Hussein 48', 72', 85'; Amjad Kalaf (penalty missed) 72'		Henri Jaudel Ambo 35'; Kosrat Baez 77' (o.g.)	Stadium: Al-Shaab Stadium

1 December 2016 8	Zakho FC	1 – 2	Al-Shorta	Zakho
11:00 GMT	Ibrahim Bayesh 63'		Marwan Hussein 22' (pen.); Abdul-Qadir Tariq 90+2'	Stadium: Zakho International Stadium

6 December 2016 9	Al-Shorta	1 – 0	Al-Kahrabaa	Baghdad
13:00 GMT	Amjad Kalaf 45'			Stadium: Al-Shaab Stadium

11 December 2016 10	Al-Zawraa	0 – 0	Al-Shorta	Baghdad
13:30 GMT				Stadium: Al-Shaab Stadium

16 December 2016 11	Al-Shorta	1 – 3	Al-Quwa Al-Jawiya	Baghdad
13:30 GMT	Abdul-Qadir Tariq 90'		Bashar Rasan 24', 52'; Emad Mohsen 89'	Stadium: Al-Shaab Stadium

21 December 2016 12	Karbala	2 – 0	Al-Shorta	Karbala
16:00 GMT	Jabbar Karim 17'; Muhaimen Salim 42'			Stadium: Karbala International Stadium

31 December 2016 13	Naft Al-Janoob	0 – 0	Al-Shorta	Basra
11:00 GMT				Stadium: Al-Zubair Stadium

5 January 2017 14	Al-Shorta	1 – 0	Amanat Baghdad	Baghdad
14:00 GMT	Ahmed Magdy 24'; Hussein Abdul-Wahed (yellow card) (yellow-red card)			Stadium: Al-Shaab Stadium

12 January 2017 15	Naft Al-Wasat	0 – 1	Al-Shorta	Najaf
13:30 GMT			Amjad Waleed 49'	Stadium: Naft Al-Wasat Stadium

17 January 2017 16	Al-Najaf	1 – 1	Al-Shorta	Najaf
11:00 GMT	Ali Ayad 4'		Ahmed Magdy 62'	Stadium: An-Najaf Stadium

23 January 2017 17	Al-Shorta	1 – 0	Al-Minaa	Baghdad
13:30 GMT	Jassim Mohammed 59'			Stadium: Al-Shaab Stadium

28 January 2017 18	Al-Naft	0 – 0	Al-Shorta	Baghdad
11:00 GMT				Stadium: Al-Naft Stadium

25 February 2017 19	Al-Shorta	1 – 0	Al-Talaba	Baghdad
14:00 GMT	Abdul-Qadir Tariq 7'			Stadium: Al-Shaab Stadium

1 March 2017 20	Al-Shorta	1 – 0	Al-Hussein	Baghdad
13:30 GMT	Mohamed Aoudou 75'			Stadium: Al-Shaab Stadium

5 March 2017 21	Al-Bahri	3 – 7	Al-Shorta	Basra
12:00 GMT	Alaa Athab 21', 45+3' (pen.); Adil Hussein 77'		Waleed Salem 45+5' (pen.), 78'; Hatem Zidan 46', 60'; Marwan Hussein 59'; Abdul-Qadir Tariq 66'; Qaid Sadir 68' (o.g.)	Stadium: Al-Zubair Stadium

10 March 2017 22	Al-Shorta	0 – 0	Al-Naft	Baghdad
14:30 GMT				Stadium: Al-Shaab Stadium

14 March 2017 23	Al-Samawa	0 – 0	Al-Shorta	Samawa
12:00 GMT				Stadium: Al-Samawa Stadium

3 April 2017 24	Al-Shorta	2 – 0	Naft Maysan	Baghdad
15:00 GMT	Marwan Hussein 26', 45'			Stadium: Al-Shaab Stadium

8 April 2017 25	Al-Karkh	1 – 2	Al-Shorta	Baghdad
12:00 GMT	Arkan Ammar 55'		Essam Yassin 73'; Abdul-Qadir Tariq 90'	Stadium: Al-Karkh Stadium

12 April 2017 26	Al-Hedood	2 – 3	Al-Shorta	Baghdad
13:00 GMT	Mustafa Mohammed 23'; (penalty missed) 88'; Ali Hussein Fandi 88'		Abdul-Qadir Tariq 45'; Marwan Hussein 60', 65'	Stadium: Al-Quwa Al-Jawiya Stadium

17 April 2017 27	Al-Shorta	4 – 0	Zakho	Baghdad
13:00 GMT	Abdul-Qadir Tariq 8'; Mahdi Kamel 28'; Mohamed Aoudou 43'; Marwan Hussein 76'			Stadium: Al-Shaab Stadium

5 May 2017 28	Al-Kahrabaa	0 – 0	Al-Shorta	Baghdad
13:30 GMT				Stadium: Al-Kahrabaa Stadium

10 May 2017 29	Al-Shorta	2 – 2	Al-Zawraa	Baghdad
15:00 GMT	Amjad Waleed 1'; Waleed Salem 35' (pen.)		Alaa Abdul-Zahra 19'; Ali Raheem 43'	Stadium: Al-Shaab Stadium

17 May 2017 30	Al-Quwa Al-Jawiya	0 – 0	Al-Shorta	Baghdad
15:00 GMT				Stadium: Al-Shaab Stadium

23 May 2017 31	Al-Shorta	2 – 0	Karbala	Baghdad
15:00 GMT	Waleed Salem 10'; Amjad Waleed 36'			Stadium: Al-Shaab Stadium

28 June 2017 32	Al-Shorta	2 – 1	Naft Al-Wasat	Baghdad
15:00 GMT	Waleed Salem 54' (pen.); Marwan Hussein 74'		Ajad Khalaf 45+4'	Stadium: Al-Shaab Stadium

10 July 2017 33	Al-Shorta	2 – 1	Naft Al-Janoob	Baghdad
15:00 GMT	Abdul-Qadir Tariq 26'; Marwan Hussein 67'		Wesam Malik 57'	Stadium: Al-Shaab Stadium

28 July 2017 34	Amanat Baghdad	0 – 1	Al-Shorta	Baghdad
13:45 GMT			Amjad Waleed 8'	Stadium: Amanat Baghdad Stadium

6 August 2017 35	Al-Shorta	3 – 2	Al-Najaf	Baghdad
13:45 GMT	Ali Lateef 18'; Marwan Hussein 42'; Abdul-Qadir Tariq 90'		Jabbar Karim 10'; Ameer Sabah 67'; (yellow card) (yellow-red card)	Stadium: Al-Shaab Stadium

10 August 2017 36	Al-Minaa	1 – 0	Al-Shorta	Basra
13:45 GMT	Ammar Abdul-Hussein 45'			Stadium: Basra International Stadium

=== Iraq FA Cup ===
27 March 2017 Third round	Al-Shorta	1 – 3	Al-Jaish	Baghdad
12:00 GMT	Abdul-Qadir Tariq 45+5'		Hussein Ahmed 36'; Samir Falah 57'; Ali Abdullah 77'	Stadium: Al-Shaab Stadium
