= 2010–11 Al-Shorta SC season =

Al Shorta
Iraqi Elite League season
- President: (Iraq) Raad Hammoudi
- Manager: (Iraq) Younis Abed Ali (until 22 March) (Iraq) Hakim Shaker (from 28 to 29 March) (Iraq) Nabil Zaki (from 30 March onwards)
- Ground: Al Shorta Stadium
- Iraqi Elite League: 8th in North Group
- Top goalscorer: League: Amjad Kalaf (11); All: Amjad Kalaf (11)
Home colours	Away colours

In the 2010-11 season, Al Shorta competed in the Iraqi Elite League. They attempted to win the league, but as a result of losing many of their key players, they found themselves battling to avoid relegation to the lower division. They survived on goal difference, one place ahead of relegated Al Mosul, by defeating Al Naft on the last day of the season thanks to a brace from their key player, Amjad Kalaf.

== Squad ==
Note: Flags indicate national team as defined under FIFA eligibility rules; some limited exceptions apply. Players may hold more than one non-FIFA nationality.

No.	Pos.	Nation	Player
1	GK	IRQ	Ali Husain
3	DF	IRQ	Ahmed Mohammed
5	DF	IRQ	Ali Jabbar
6	MF	IRQ	Haitham Kadhim Jassim
8	MF	IRQ	Emad Ghali
9	MF	IRQ	Ahmad Hannon
10	FW	IRQ	Bashar Saad
11	MF	IRQ	Jabir Shakir
12	MF	IRQ	Lewaa Abdul-Hussein
13	MF	IRQ	Dhirgham Ismail
14	FW	IRQ	Amjad Kalaf
15	DF	IRQ	Waleed Bahar
17	FW	IRQ	Hashim Ridha (captain)
18	MF	IRQ	Ali Zoyed

No.	Pos.	Nation	Player
19	DF	IRQ	Kassim Zidan (vice-captain)
20	MF	IRQ	Fareed Majeed
21	DF	IRQ	Ismail Ahmed
22	GK	IRQ	Luay Khalil
29	FW	IRQ	Ali Oudah
30	DF	IRQ	Mohammed Kareem
35	MF	IRQ	Ahmad Fadhel
66	MF	IRQ	Wissam Kadhim
99	DF	IRQ	Ahmed Chasib
—	GK	IRQ	Hussein Shallal
—	MF	IRQ	Ahmed Khalaf
—	MF	IRQ	Mahdi Kamel
—	FW	IRQ	Omar Kadhim

== Kit ==
Period	Home colours	Away colours	Supplier
November 2010 – March 2011			Uhlsport
March 2011 – August 2011			Adidas

== Transfers ==
=== In ===
Date	Pos.	Name	From	Fee
August 2010	FW	(Iraq) Ahmad Hannon	(Iraq) Al Quwa Al Jawiya	-
September 2010	FW	(Iraq) Karrar Tariq	(Iraq) Al Talaba	-
September 2010	DF	(Iraq) Waleed Bahar	(Iraq) Al Naft	-
September 2010	FW	(Iraq) Ali Oudah	(Iraq) Al Naft	-
September 2010	MF	(Iraq) Mohammed Hannon Mashkoor	(Iraq) Al Quwa Al Jawiya	-
October 2010	DF	(Iraq) Kassim Zidan	(Iraq) Al Zawraa	-
October 2010	DF	(Iraq) Ahmed Mohammed	(Iraq) Al Quwa Al Jawiya	-
October 2010	DF	(Iraq) Ali Jabbar	(Iraq) Al Zawraa	-
October 2010	GK	(Iraq) Ali Husain	(Iraq) Al Naft	-
October 2010	DF	(Iraq) Mohammed Ali Karim	(Iraq) Al Zawraa	-
November 2010	FW	(Iraq) Amjad Kalaf	(Iraq) Arbil FC	-
February 2011	MF	(Iraq) Fareed Majeed	(Iran) Naft Tehran F.C.	-
February 2011	MF	(Iraq) Jabir Shakir	(Iraq) Al Quwa Al Jawiya	-
February 2011	MF	(Iraq) Haitham Kadhim Jassim	(Iraq) Baghdad FC	-

=== Out ===
Date	Pos.	Name	To	Fee
September 2010	DF	(Iraq) Ahmed Kadhim Assad	(Iraq) Al Naft	-
September 2010	GK	(Iraq) Akram Sabih	(Iraq) Al Hassanin	-
September 2010	GK	(Iraq) Wissam Gassid	(Iraq) Al Quwa Al Jawiya	-
September 2010	FW	(Iraq) Hussein Karim	(Iraq) Dohuk FC	-
September 2010	FW	(Iraq) Amjad Kalaf	(Iraq) Arbil FC	-
October 2010	FW	(Iraq) Asaad Abdul-Nabi	(Iraq) Al Masafi	-
October 2010	DF	(Iraq) Emad Khalaf	(Iraq) Najaf FC	-
October 2010	DF	(Iraq) Salah Hilal	(Iraq) Al Quwa Al Jawiya	-
October 2010	DF	(Iraq) Manhal Abbas	(Iraq) Samarra FC	-
October 2010	FW	(Iraq) Younis Shakor	(Iraq) Arbil FC	-
October 2010	DF	(Iraq) Ous Ibrahim	(Iraq) Arbil FC	-
October 2010	DF	(Iraq) Raad Magtoof	(Iraq) Baghdad FC	-
October 2010	DF	(Iraq) Saad Attiya Hafidh	(Iraq) Arbil FC	-
December 2010	DF	(Iraq) Samal Saeed Mujbel	(Iraq) Najaf FC	-
January 2011	MF	(Iraq) Khaldoun Ibrahim	(Iran) Naft Tehran F.C.	-
February 2011	FW	(Iraq) Karrar Tariq	(Iraq) Najaf FC	-
February 2011	MF	(Iraq) Kareem Tahran		-
February 2011	MF	(Iraq) Ali Shahid		-
February 2011	MF	(Iraq) Mohammad Hannon Mashkoor		-
March 2011	DF	(Iraq) Ali Kareem	(Iraq) Al-Hindiya	-
March 2011	DF	(Iraq) Mohammed Ali Karim	(Iraq) Arbil FC	-
March 2011	Manager	(Iraq) Younis Abed Ali		-

== Matches ==
=== Iraqi Elite League ===
==== First Stage (North Group) ====
27 November 2010 1	Al Karkh	0 – 0	Al Shorta	Baghdad
11:30 GMT				Stadium: Al Karkh Stadium

4 December 2010 2	Al Shorta	4 – 0	Al Ramadi	Baghdad
11:30 GMT	Ahmad Hannon 10'; Amjad Kalaf 45', 83'; Kassim Zidan 80'			Stadium: Al Shorta Stadium

11 December 2010 3	Zakho	1 – 1	Al Shorta	Zakho
11:00 GMT	Broosh Jadir 8'		Amjad Kalaf 20'

25 December 2010 4	Al Shorta	2 – 1	Al Jaish	Baghdad
11:30 GMT	Emad Ghali 68'; Amjad Kalaf 87' (pen.)		Mustafa Khaled 90+4'	Stadium: Al Shorta Stadium

2 January 2011 5	Peshmerga	2 – 1	Al Shorta	Peshmerga
11:00 GMT	Jutiar Jazaa 26'; Ahmed Salar 41'		Amjad Kalaf 51'

8 January 2011 6	Al Mosul	0 – 0	Al Shorta	Mosul
11:00 GMT				Stadium: University of Mosul Stadium

15 January 2011 7	Al Shorta	1 – 1	Diyala	Baghdad
11:30 GMT	Ahmad Fadhel 28'		Mustafa Kareem 61'	Stadium: Al Shorta Stadium

30 January 2011 8	Al Sinaa	0 – 0	Al Shorta	Baghdad
11:30 GMT				Stadium: Al Sina'a Stadium

5 February 2011 9	Al Shorta	1 – 0	Dohuk	Baghdad
11:30 GMT	Amjad Kalaf 84'			Stadium: Al Shorta Stadium

9 February 2011 10	Al Shorta	3 – 1	Arbil	Baghdad
11:30 GMT	Dhirgham Ismail 25'; Amjad Kalaf 42', 45+1'		Hussein Abdul-Wahed 2'	Stadium: Al Shorta Stadium

13 February 2011 11	Al Shorta	0 – 3	Al Kahraba	Baghdad
11:30 GMT			Ahmad Hassan 9'; Ahmed Kadhem Abas 42', 62'	Stadium: Al Shorta Stadium

19 February 2011 12	Samaraa	0 – 0	Al Shorta	Samarra
11:00 GMT				Stadium: Samaraa Stadium

28 February 2011 13	Al Naft	2 – 0	Al Shorta	Baghdad
11:30 GMT	Husain Ali 79' (pen.); Alaa Aasi 84'		Waleed Bahar (red card) 73'	Stadium: Al Naft Stadium

14 March 2011 14	Al Shorta	0 – 0	Al Karkh	Baghdad
11:30 GMT				Stadium: Al Shorta Stadium

20 March 2011 15	Al Ramadi	2 – 1	Al Shorta	Ramadi
11:30 GMT	Ammar Ahmed 33', 36'		Hashim Ridha 75'	Stadium: Al Ramadi Stadium

29 March 2011 16	Al Shorta	0 – 0	Zakho	Baghdad
12:00 GMT				Stadium: Al Shorta Stadium

6 April 2011 17	Arbil	2 – 0	Al Shorta	Arbil
11:30 GMT	Mustafa Ahmad 42'; Luay Salah 74'			Stadium: Franso Hariri Stadium

12 April 2011 18	Al Jaish	2 – 2	Al Shorta	Baghdad
12:30 GMT	Ahmed Hussein 3'; Fareed Majeed 85' (o.g.)		Ahmad Hannon 34'; Fareed Majeed 90' (pen.)	Stadium: Al Jaish Stadium

17 April 2011 19	Al Shorta	2 – 0	Peshmerga	Baghdad
12:30 GMT	Ali Oudah 57', 83'		Penalty missed	Stadium: Al Shorta Stadium

30 April 2011 20	Diyala	1 – 1	Al Shorta	Diyala
12:30 GMT	Adnan Khairallah 61'		Kassim Zidan 18'	Stadium: Al Ba'quba Stadium

6 May 2011 21	Al Shorta	1 – 1	Al Sinaa	Baghdad
13:00 GMT	Ali Oudah 90+2'; Ali Oudah (red card) 90+2'		Saif Jaber 55'; Samih Sabeeh (red card) 90+2'	Stadium: Al Shorta Stadium

24 May 2011 22	Al Shorta	1 – 2	Al Mosul	Baghdad
13:00 GMT	Fareed Majeed (penalty missed) 42'; Ahmad Hannon 55'		Ahmed Mohammed 23'; Hatem Zidan 76'	Stadium: Al Shorta Stadium

9 June 2011 23	Al Kahraba	0 – 2	Al Shorta	Baghdad
14:00 GMT			Ahmad Hannon 51', 89' (pen.)	Stadium: Al Zawraa Stadium

1 July 2011 24	Al Shorta	3 – 1	Samaraa	Baghdad
13:30 GMT	Amjad Kalaf 65', (penalty missed) 80'; Ali Oudah 85'; Dhirgham Ismail 90+4'		Muhammed Naser Numy 70'	Stadium: Al Zawraa Stadium

25 July 2011 25	Dohuk	1 – 0	Al Shorta	Dohuk
13:30 GMT	Wissam Zaki 40'			Stadium: Duhok Stadium

1 August 2011 26	Al Shorta	2 – 0	Al Naft	Baghdad
13:30 GMT	Amjad Kalaf 39', 77'			Stadium: Al Zawraa Stadium
