= Tournament for the Iraqi Armed Forces =

Tournament details
- Country: Iraq
- Dates: 21 March 2015
- Teams: 4

Final positions
- Champions: Al-Zawraa
- Runners-up: Al-Quwa Al-Jawiya

The Tournament for the Iraqi Armed Forces (Arabic: بطولة دعم قوات المسلحة العراقية) was a friendly football competition in Iraq hosted by Al-Shaab Stadium on 21 March 2015 and contested between the four biggest clubs in Baghdad: Al-Quwa Al-Jawiya, Al-Shorta, Al-Talaba and Al-Zawraa. The event was held in support of the Iraqi Armed Forces and the Popular Mobilization Forces and their fight against terrorism.

Entry was free for spectators and the tournament consisted of three 30-minute matches, culminating in Al-Zawraa winning the cup by beating Al-Quwa Al-Jawiya 5–4 in a penalty shootout.

== Semi-finals ==
21 March 2015
(30 minute match)

Al-Talaba	0–0	Al-Zawraa
Penalties
S. Sadir (penalty missed); Faisel (penalty scored); Abbas (penalty missed); Bahar (penalty scored)	2–4	(penalty scored) Jalal; (penalty scored) M. Saad; (penalty scored) A. Saad; (penalty scored) A. Sadir

Al-Shaab Stadium, Baghdad

Al-Talaba	Al-Zawraa

GK	12	(Iraq) Mohannad Qasim
DF	14	(Iraq) Fadhel Muqdad
DF	24	(Iraq) Hassan Attwan
DF	15	(Iraq) Waleed Bahar
DF	21	(Iraq) Ali Faez Qasim
MF	17	(Iraq) Ihab Kadhim	(substituted off) 28'
MF	22	(Iraq) Osama Ali	(substituted off) 22'
MF	16	(Iraq) Mohammed Faisel
MF	13	(Iraq) Ahmed Abdul-Amir
MF	6	(Iraq) Salih Sadir (c)
FW	5	(Iraq) Marwan Abbas
Substitutes:
MF	7	(Iraq) Ali Rasheed	(substituted on) 22'
MF	5	(Iraq) Bashar Saadoun	(substituted on) 28'
Manager:
(Iraq) Salih Radhi

GK	20	(Iraq) Alaa Gatea
DF	14	(Iraq) Haidar Abdul-Amir (c)
DF	26	(Iraq) Saif Hatem
DF	4	(Iraq) Muayad Khalid
DF	6	(Iraq) Ayad Sadir
MF	34	(Iraq) Jassim Mohammed
MF	8	(Iraq) Mohammed Saad
MF	18	(Iraq) Namir Hameed
MF	33	(Iraq) Hussein Ali
FW	7	(Iraq) Ali Saad
FW	15	(Iraq) Mustafa Jalal
Manager:
(Iraq) Emad Mohammed

21 March 2015
(30 minute match)

Al-Quwa Al-Jawiya	0–0	Al-Shorta
Penalties
M. Karim (penalty scored); Abdul-Jabbar (penalty scored); Kadhim (penalty scored); Malik (penalty scored)	4–2	(penalty scored) Salem; (penalty scored) Ali; (penalty missed) Awoa; (penalty missed) Hassan

Al-Shaab Stadium, Baghdad

Al-Quwa Al-Jawiya	Al-Shorta

GK	21	(Iraq) Haidar Mohammed
DF	3	(Iraq) Ali Abdul-Jabbar
DF	29	(Iraq) Taif Amead
DF	24	(Iraq) Faisal Jassim
DF	31	(Iraq) Majid Jawad
MF	7	(Iraq) Haitham Kadhim (c)
MF	25	(Iraq) Hossam Malik
MF	8	(Iraq) Samer Saeed
MF	26	(Iraq) Mohammed Hanoon
FW	5	(Iraq) Mustafa Karim
FW	15	(Iraq) Ali Yousif	Substituted off
Substitutes:
FW	14	(Iraq) Sultan Jassim	Substituted on
Manager:
(Iraq) Abbas Attiya

GK	1	(Iraq) Saif Jameel
DF	29	(Iraq) Ahmed Fakhir
DF	22	(Nigeria) Innocent Awoa (c)
DF	32	(Iraq) Hamza Hassan
MF	20	(Iraq) Akram Jassim
MF	25	(Iraq) Murtadha Hudaib
MF	27	(Iraq) Mohammed Hadi
MF	33	(Iraq) Mustafa Mohsin
MF	16	(Iraq) Haider Salem
FW	34	(Iraq) Saif Ahmed
FW	26	(Iraq) Mohanad Ali
Manager:
(Iraq) Karim Nafea

== Final ==
21 March 2015
(30 minute match)

Al-Quwa Al-Jawiya	0–0	Al-Zawraa
Penalties
M. Karim (penalty scored); Abdul-Jabbar (penalty scored); Kadhim (penalty scored); Jassim (penalty missed); Saeed (penalty scored)	4–5	(penalty scored) Jalal; (penalty scored) M. Saad; (penalty scored) A. Saad; (penalty scored) A. Sadir; (penalty scored) Abdul-Amir

Al-Shaab Stadium, Baghdad

Al-Quwa Al-Jawiya	Al-Zawraa

GK	21	(Iraq) Haidar Mohammed
DF	3	(Iraq) Ali Abdul-Jabbar
DF	29	(Iraq) Taif Amead
DF	24	(Iraq) Faisal Jassim
DF	31	(Iraq) Majid Jawad
MF	7	(Iraq) Haitham Kadhim (c)
MF	25	(Iraq) Hossam Malik	(substituted off) 12'
MF	8	(Iraq) Samer Saeed
MF	11	(Iraq) Rafid Muayad	(substituted off) 14'
FW	5	(Iraq) Mustafa Karim
FW	14	(Iraq) Sultan Jassim
Substitutes:
MF	13	(Iraq) Ayman Abdul-Hamza	(substituted on) 12'
MF	26	(Iraq) Mohammed Hanoon	(substituted on) 14'
Manager:
(Iraq) Abbas Attiya

GK	1	(Iraq) Zuhair Fadhel
DF	14	(Iraq) Haidar Abdul-Amir (c)
DF	26	(Iraq) Saif Hatem
DF	4	(Iraq) Muayad Khalid
DF	6	(Iraq) Ayad Sadir
MF	34	(Iraq) Jassim Mohammed
MF	8	(Iraq) Mohammed Saad
MF	35	(Iraq) Samer Majid
MF	33	(Iraq) Hussein Ali
FW	7	(Iraq) Ali Saad
FW	15	(Iraq) Mustafa Jalal
Manager:
(Iraq) Emad Mohammed
