= 2022–23 Iraqi Premier League =

49th season of the Iraqi Premier League

Iraqi Premier League
- Season: 2022–23
- Dates: 9 October 2022 – 21 July 2023
- Champions: Al-Shorta (6th title)
- Relegated: Al-Sinaa; Al-Diwaniya
- AFC Champions League: Al-Quwa Al-Jawiya
- AFC Cup: Al-Zawraa; Al-Kahrabaa
- Matches: 380
- Goals: 830 (2.18 per match)
- Top goalscorer: Mohannad Abdul-Raheem (18 goals)
- Biggest home win: Al-Quwa Al-Jawiya 9–2 Al-Diwaniya (11 May 2023)
- Biggest away win: Al-Najaf 0–5 Al-Shorta (25 June 2023)
- Highest scoring: Al-Quwa Al-Jawiya 9–2 Al-Diwaniya (11 May 2023)
- Longest winning run: 6 matches Al-Kahrabaa; Al-Najaf
- Longest unbeaten run: 18 matches Al-Zawraa
- Longest winless run: 15 matches Al-Diwaniya
- Longest losing run: 7 matches Al-Diwaniya

The 2022–23 Iraqi Premier League was the 49th season of the Iraqi Premier League, the highest tier football league in Iraq, since its establishment in 1974 and the last season under the name Iraqi Premier League. The season started on 9 October 2022 and ended on 21 July 2023.

Al-Hudood, Karbala and Duhok joined as the promoted clubs from the 2021–22 Iraqi First Division League, replacing Amanat Baghdad, Al-Minaa and Samarra who were relegated.

Al-Shorta were crowned Iraqi Premier League champions for the second time in a row, securing the title with a 3–0 win away to Naft Maysan in the penultimate round of the season.

== Teams ==
Locations of the 2022–23 Iraqi Premier League teams

=== Clubs and locations ===
Team	Manager	Location	Stadium	Capacity
Al-Diwaniya	(Iraq) Haider Hussien Shamran	Al-Qadisiyya	Al-Kut Olympic Stadium	20,000
Al-Hudood	(Iraq) Adel Nima	Baghdad	Al-Shaab Stadium	34,200
Al-Kahrabaa	(Iraq) Luay Salah	Baghdad	Al-Zawraa Stadium	15,443
Al-Karkh	(Iraq) Ahmed Abdul-Jabar	Baghdad	Al-Saher Ahmed Radhi Stadium	5,150
Al-Naft	(Iraq) Basim Qasim	Baghdad	Al-Madina Stadium	32,000
Al-Najaf	(Iraq) Saad Hafedh	Najaf	Al-Najaf International Stadium	30,000
Al-Qasim	(Iraq) Chasib Sultan	Babil	Karbala International Stadium	30,000
Al-Quwa Al-Jawiya	(Egypt) Moamen Soliman	Baghdad	Al-Shaab Stadium	34,200
Al-Shorta	(Iraq) Ahmed Salah	Baghdad	Al-Shaab Stadium	34,200
Al-Sinaa	(Iraq) Qusay Munir	Baghdad	Al-Sinaa Stadium	10,000
Al-Talaba	(Iraq) Ahmed Khalaf	Baghdad	Al-Madina Stadium	32,000
Al-Zawraa	(Iraq) Haidar Abdul-Amir	Baghdad	Al-Zawraa Stadium	15,443
Duhok	(Iraq) Soliman Ramadan	Duhok	Duhok Stadium	22,800
Erbil	(Iraq) Abbas Obeid	Erbil	Franso Hariri Stadium	25,000
Karbala	(Iraq) Haidar Aboodi	Karbala	Karbala International Stadium	30,000
Naft Al-Basra	(Iraq) Abdul-Wahab Abu Al-Hail	Basra	Al-Fayhaa Stadium	10,000
Naft Al-Wasat	(Iraq) Majed Najim	Najaf	Al-Najaf International Stadium	30,000
Naft Maysan	(Iraq) Uday Ismail	Maysan	Maysan Olympic Stadium	25,000
Newroz	(Iraq) Wali Kareem	Sulaymaniya	Sulaymaniya Stadium	15,000
Zakho	(Syria) Nizar Mahrous	Duhok	Zakho International Stadium	20,000

=== Managerial changes ===
Team	Outgoing manager	Manner of departure	Date of vacancy	Position in the table	Incoming manager	Date of appointment
Al-Diwaniya	(Iraq) Qusay Munir	Mutual consent	26 August 2022	Pre-season	(Iraq) Samer Saeed	29 August 2022
Erbil	(Syria) Nizar Mahrous	Mutual consent	16 October 2022	16th	(Iraq) Ghazi Fahad	22 October 2022
Zakho	(Iraq) Hamza Hadi	Mutual consent	25 October 2022	14th	(Iraq) Haidar Abdul-Amir	30 October 2022
Al-Naft	(Iraq) Hassan Ahmed	Mutual consent	1 November 2022	18th	(Iraq) Hakeem Shaker	1 November 2022
Al-Talaba	(Iraq) Thair Ahmed	Mutual consent	4 November 2022	7th	(Tunisia) Yamen Zelfani	20 November 2022
Al-Diwaniya	(Iraq) Samer Saeed	Mutual consent	30 November 2022	20th	(Jordan) Haitham Al-Shboul	1 December 2022
Al-Sinaa	(Iraq) Sadeq Hanoon	Sacked	30 November 2022	19th	(Iraq) Tahsin Fadhel (interim)	1 December 2022
Al-Sinaa	(Iraq) Tahsin Fadhel	End of interim spell	27 December 2022	19th	(Iraq) Khalid Mohammed Sabbar	27 December 2022
Naft Al-Wasat	(Iraq) Abdul-Ghani Shahad	Sacked	18 January 2023	12th	(Iraq) Samer Saeed	18 January 2023
Al-Diwaniya	(Jordan) Haitham Al-Shboul	Mutual consent	27 January 2023	20th	(Iraq) Chasib Sultan	28 January 2023
Al-Najaf	(Iraq) Ahmed Khalaf	Sacked	3 February 2023	7th	(Iraq) Abdul-Ghani Shahad	4 February 2023
Erbil	(Iraq) Ghazi Fahad	Mutual consent	6 February 2023	17th	(Iraq) Abdul-Qader Hussein (interim)	6 February 2023
Al-Naft	(Iraq) Hakeem Shaker	Mutual consent	7 February 2023	18th	(Iraq) Mohammed Jassim (interim)	7 February 2023
Al-Qasim	(Iraq) Ali Abdul-Jabbar	Mutual consent	13 February 2023	18th	(Iraq) Hassan Hadi (interim)	16 February 2023
Al-Naft	(Iraq) Mohammed Jassim	End of interim spell	1 March 2023	18th	(Egypt) Mohamed Youssef	1 March 2023
Karbala	(Iraq) Abbas Attiya	Mutual consent	4 March 2023	14th	(Iraq) Haidar Aboodi	4 March 2023
Al-Diwaniya	(Iraq) Chasib Sultan	Mutual consent	6 March 2023	20th	(Iraq) Saeed Mohsen	6 March 2023
Erbil	(Iraq) Abdul-Qader Hussein	End of interim spell	10 March 2023	16th	(Iraq) Abbas Obeid	10 March 2023
Al-Diwaniya	(Iraq) Saeed Mohsen	Mutual consent	12 March 2023	20th	(Iraq) Ahmed Ali Takhtakh (interim)	12 March 2023
Al-Qasim	(Iraq) Hassan Hadi	End of interim spell	13 March 2023	18th	(Iraq) Ali Abdul-Jabbar (Although he is suspended)	13 March 2023
Al-Shorta	(Egypt) Moamen Soliman	Sacked	17 March 2023	1st	(Iraq) Ahmed Salah	17 March 2023
Al-Najaf	(Iraq) Abdul-Ghani Shahad	Mutual consent	31 March 2023	9th	(Iraq) Saad Hafedh	6 April 2023
Al-Diwaniya	(Iraq) Ahmed Ali Takhtakh	End of interim spell	3 April 2023	20th	(Iraq) Haider Abu-Ajjah	3 April 2023
Al-Talaba	(Tunisia) Yamen Zelfani	Mutual consent	10 April 2023	5th	(Iraq) Ahmed Khalaf	11 April 2023
Al-Quwa Al-Jawiya	(Iraq) Qahtan Chathir	Sacked	10 April 2023	2nd	(Iraq) Hammadi Ahmed (interim)	15 April 2023
Al-Sinaa	(Iraq) Khalid Mohammed Sabbar	Mutual consent	12 April 2023	19th	(Iraq) Qusay Munir	13 April 2023
Al-Quwa Al-Jawiya	(Iraq) Hammadi Ahmed	End of interim spell	17 April 2023	2nd	(Egypt) Moamen Soliman	17 April 2023
Naft Al-Wasat	(Iraq) Samer Saeed	Mutual consent	17 April 2023	16th	(Iraq) Majed Najem	18 April 2023
Al-Qasim	(Iraq) Ali Abdul-Jabbar	Mutual consent	27 April 2023	17th	(Iraq) Chasib Sultan	27 April 2023
Zakho	(Iraq) Haidar Abdul-Amir	Mutual consent	1 May 2023	16th	(Syria) Nizar Mahrous	2 May 2023
Al-Naft	(Egypt) Mohamed Youssef	Mutual consent	8 May 2023	18th	(Iraq) Mohammed Jassim (interim)	8 May 2023
Al-Zawraa	(Iraq) Ayoub Odisho	Mutual consent	11 May 2023	3rd	(Iraq) Haidar Abdul-Amir	11 May 2023
Al-Diwaniya	(Iraq) Haider Abu-Ajjah	Mutual consent	14 May 2023	20th	(Iraq) Haider Hussien Shamran	14 May 2023
Al-Naft	(Iraq) Mohammed Jassim	End of interim spell	30 May 2023	18th	(Iraq) Basim Qasim	30 May 2023

== League table ==
Pos	Team	Pld	W	D	L	GF	GA	GD	Pts	Qualification or relegation
1	Al-Shorta (C)	38	25	7	6	63	24	+39	82	
2	Al-Quwa Al-Jawiya	38	23	9	6	62	26	+36	78	Qualification for the AFC Champions League group stage (Note: Al-Shorta were not granted an AFC license, therefore their AFC Champions League spot was passed to the league runners-up and Iraq FA Cup winners Al-Quwa Al-Jawiya.)
3	Al-Zawraa	38	18	14	6	50	32	+18	68	Qualification for the AFC Cup group stage (Note: As Al-Quwa Al-Jawiya (league runners-up and Iraq FA Cup winners) entered the AFC Champions League, the two AFC Cup spots were passed down to Iraq's only other licensed clubs, Al-Zawraa and Al-Kahrabaa.)
4	Al-Talaba	38	19	9	10	52	39	+13	66	
5	Al-Kahrabaa	38	17	11	10	51	38	+13	62	Qualification for the AFC Cup group stage
6	Erbil	38	16	10	12	44	39	+5	58	
7	Al-Najaf	38	15	11	12	46	41	+5	56 (Note: Al-Najaf finished ahead of Karbala on head-to-head points: Al-Najaf 3–2 Karbala, Karbala 0–3 Al-Najaf.)	
8	Karbala	38	15	11	12	39	34	+5	56	
9	Duhok	38	12	16	10	37	39	−2	52	
10	Newroz	38	14	9	15	45	43	+2	51 (Note: Newroz and Naft Maysan finished ahead of Al-Karkh on head-to-head points: Newroz 7, Naft Maysan 7, Al-Karkh 2. Newroz finished ahead of Naft Maysan on goal difference: Newroz +2, Naft Maysan –12.)	
11	Naft Maysan	38	13	12	13	42	54	−12	51	
12	Al-Karkh	38	13	12	13	40	36	+4	51	
13	Al-Hudood	38	10	19	9	40	37	+3	49	
14	Zakho	38	10	14	14	40	40	0	44	
15	Naft Al-Basra	38	9	15	14	32	41	−9	42	
16	Al-Naft	38	9	13	16	39	50	−11	40	
17	Al-Qasim	38	9	12	17	31	43	−12	39	
18	Naft Al-Wasat	38	5	21	12	26	34	−8	36	
19	Al-Sinaa (R)	38	7	7	24	26	54	−28	28	Relegation to the Iraqi First Division League
20	Al-Diwaniya (R)	38	2	6	30	25	86	−61	12	Relegation to the Iraqi First Division League

Source: IPFL
Rules for classification: 1) points; 2) head-to-head points; 3) head-to-head goal difference; 4) goal difference; 5) number of wins; 6) number of goals scored.
(C) Champions; (R) Relegated

== Results ==
Home \ Away	DIW	HUD	KAH	KKH	NFT	NJF	QSM	QWJ	SHR	SIN	TLB	ZWR	DHK	ERB	KRB	NFB	NFW	NFM	NRZ	ZAK
Al-Diwaniya		1–3	0–2	0–3	2–2	1–2	1–0	0–3	0–3	2–1	2–2	0–1	0–1	0–1	1–3	0–4	0–2	0–1	1–3	1–5
Al-Hudood	1–0		1–1	1–1	4–1	0–0	0–0	0–2	2–2	1–2	2–0	0–1	1–1	1–1	2–4	0–0	0–0	3–1	1–0	1–1
Al-Kahrabaa	5–0	1–0		2–1	0–1	3–1	0–0	1–1	1–3	2–0	0–2	0–0	3–0	1–3	0–1	2–2	0–0	2–1	0–0	1–0
Al-Karkh	1–1	1–2	3–1		0–1	0–0	2–1	1–2	2–3	2–1	1–0	2–2	0–0	3–1	1–0	1–0	0–0	1–2	1–1	1–0
Al-Naft	1–1	1–2	0–3	3–2		0–0	2–0	0–2	1–2	0–0	1–1	1–2	4–0	0–2	1–0	1–2	3–3	1–2	1–1	1–1
Al-Najaf	0–0	0–0	1–0	2–3	1–2		0–0	0–2	0–5	2–0	1–2	1–0	0–1	2–3	3–2	1–1	3–1	5–2	2–1	3–1
Al-Qasim	3–0	0–0	2–1	0–1	1–0	0–1		1–2	0–2	0–1	0–2	1–1	0–3 (Note: The Al-Qasim–Duhok match originally ended in a 0–0 draw but was changed to a 3–0 win for Duhok as Al-Qasim failed to ensure an ambulance was present within the first 15 minutes of the match, which violated league rules.)	0–0	3–1	0–1	2–1	2–1	1–1	0–0
Al-Quwa Al-Jawiya	9–2	0–0	2–3	2–1	0–0	2–0	3–4		1–0	4–0	1–0	0–1	0–0	2–1	1–0	0–1	2–1	1–1	1–0	2–1
Al-Shorta	1–0	2–1	2–0	0–1	1–0	1–0	1–0	0–0		4–0	2–2	2–1	1–0	2–1	3–1	1–1	1–1	3–0	1–0	1–0
Al-Sinaa	3–2	0–1	0–2	1–1	3–0	0–1	0–0	0–2	0–1		0–1	0–2	1–3	1–2	0–0	1–0	1–2	3–2	0–1	0–0
Al-Talaba	2–1	2–2	1–1	2–0	1–2	1–1	3–1	1–2	0–3	2–1		1–0	2–0	3–1	1–0	2–1	1–1	0–1	2–1	0–1
Al-Zawraa	1–0	2–2	0–1	1–0	2–2	1–1	1–0	0–0	2–1	2–0	0–1		1–1	3–1	1–0	2–2	1–0	1–2	3–1	2–1
Duhok	2–0	0–2	2–2	0–2	1–0	2–4	2–1	0–0	1–1	2–0	0–2	1–1		0–0	1–1	2–1	0–0	3–1	1–0	1–1
Erbil	3–2	1–1	0–1	0–0	2–0	1–0	3–0 (Note: The Erbil–Al-Qasim match was awarded as a 3–0 win to Erbil, as Al-Qasim did not turn up for the game.)	2–0	1–0	0–4	0–2	0–1	1–0		1–0	1–1	0–0	3–1	0–0	2–1
Karbala	3–1	2–0	1–1	2–1	0–0	0–3 (Note: The Karbala–Al-Najaf match originally ended in a 2–1 win for Karbala but was changed to a 3–0 win for Al-Najaf due to Karbala fielding the ineligible player Ahmed Mohammed Hussein, who had been suspended for receiving three yellow cards in previous matches.)	1–1	1–2	1–0	1–0	3–1	1–1	0–1	2–1		0–0	0–0	1–1	2–0	1–0
Naft Al-Basra	1–1	0–0	1–2	0–0	0–3	0–2	0–1	1–1	0–2	1–0	1–2	0–0	1–1	1–3	0–1		1–0	2–1	1–0	3–2
Naft Al-Wasat	2–0	0–0	1–2	0–0	0–0	1–1	1–1	2–1	1–0	1–1	1–2	2–2	1–1	0–0	0–1	0–0		0–0	0–2	0–1
Naft Maysan	1–0	1–0	2–2	0–0	1–0	1–0	3–1	0–4	0–3	0–0	2–1	1–3	1–1	2–1	1–1	1–1	0–0		2–1	2–2
Newroz	3–1	3–1	1–2	1–0	2–2	1–1	0–3	0–1	2–2	3–0	1–1	2–4	2–1	2–1	0–1	1–0	2–0	2–1		2–1
Zakho	2–1	2–2	2–0	1–0	3–1	0–1	1–1	0–2	0–1	2–1	1–1	1–1	1–1	0–0	0–0	3–0 (Note: The Zakho–Naft Al-Basra match originally ended in a 2–2 draw but was changed to a 3–0 win for Zakho due to Naft Al-Basra fielding three ineligible players (Ahmed Zamel, Hussein Ammar and Haider Abdul-Rahim), who had all been suspended for receiving three yellow cards in previous matches.)	2–1	0–0	0–2	

Source: IPFL
Legend: Blue = home team win; Yellow = draw; Red = away team win.

== Season statistics ==
=== Top scorers ===
Rank	Player	Club	Goals
1	(Iraq) Mohannad Abdul-Raheem	Al-Quwa Al-Jawiya	18
2	(Mauritania) Mouhamed Soueid	Al-Hudood	17
3	(Ghana) Denny Antwi	Al-Naft	16
4	(Iraq) Muhaimen Salim	Al-Kahrabaa	15
5	(Brazil) Cláudio Maradona	Newroz	12
5	(Iraq) Alaa Abdul-Zahra	Al-Shorta	12

==== Hat-tricks ====
Player	For	Against	Result	Date
(Yemen) Nasser Al-Gahwashi	Naft Al-Wasat	Al-Naft	3–3 (A)	29 November 2022
(Iraq) Husham Ahmed	Al-Sinaa	Erbil	4–0 (A)	6 February 2023
(Iraq) Aso Rostam	Al-Shorta	Naft Maysan	3–0 (H)	23 February 2023
(Ghana) Denny Antwi	Al-Naft	Al-Karkh	3–2 (H)	30 May 2023
(Iraq) Muhaimen Salim^{4}	Al-Kahrabaa	Al-Diwaniya	5–0 (H)	15 July 2023

Notes

^{4} Player scored 4 goals
(H) – Home team
(A) – Away team
