= Nabeel Abbas =

Iraqi footballer (born 1986)

Personal information
- Full name: Nabeel Abbas Lafta
- Date of birth: 1 January 1986 (age 40)
- Place of birth: Najaf, Iraq
- Position: Defender

Team information
- Current team: Naft Al-Wasat SC (Director of football)

Senior career*
Years	Team	Apps	(Gls)
2006–2008	Najaf		
2008–2009	Al Buqa'a		
2009	Najaf		
2009–2010	Arbil		
2010–2014	Najaf		
2014–2019	Naft Al-Wasat		

International career^{‡}
2008	Iraq U-23	3	(0)
2007–2008	Iraq	2	(0)

Managerial career
- 2019: Naft Al-Wasat SC (Managing Director)
- 2019–: Naft Al-Wasat SC (Director of football)
Medal record
Men's football
Representing Iraq
AFC Asian Cup
Winner	2007 Indonesia/Malaysia/ Thailand/Vietnam
- * Club domestic league appearances and goals ‡ National team caps and goals as of 24 January 2008

Nabeel Abbas Lafta (Arabic: نَبِيل عَبَّاس لَفْتَة; born 1 January 1986 in Najaf, Iraq) is an Iraqi former footballer who last played as a defender for Naft Al-Wasat in the Iraqi Premier League.

== Honours ==
=== Club ===
Naft Al-Wasat

- Iraqi Premier League: 2014–15

=== International ===
- AFC Asian Cup: 2007
