= Jabir Shakir =

Iraqi footballer

Personal information
- Full name: Jabir Shakir
- Date of birth: January 1, 1987 (age 39)
- Place of birth: Baghdad, Iraq
- Position: Midfielder

Team information
- Current team: Al Shorta
- Number: 10

Senior career*
Years	Team	Apps	(Gls)
2005–2007	Al-Naft		
2007–2008	Al-Kahraba		
2008–2010	Al-Talaba		
2010–2011	Al-Zawraa		
2011–	Al Shorta		

International career^{‡}
2008	Iraq B	3	(0)
2009–	Iraq	1	(0)
- * Club domestic league appearances and goals ‡ National team caps and goals as of March 22, 2009

Jabir Shakir (Arabic: جابر شاكر) (born 1987) is an Iraqi football midfielder who plays for Al Shorta.
