= Ammar Ahmed =

Swedish professional footballer

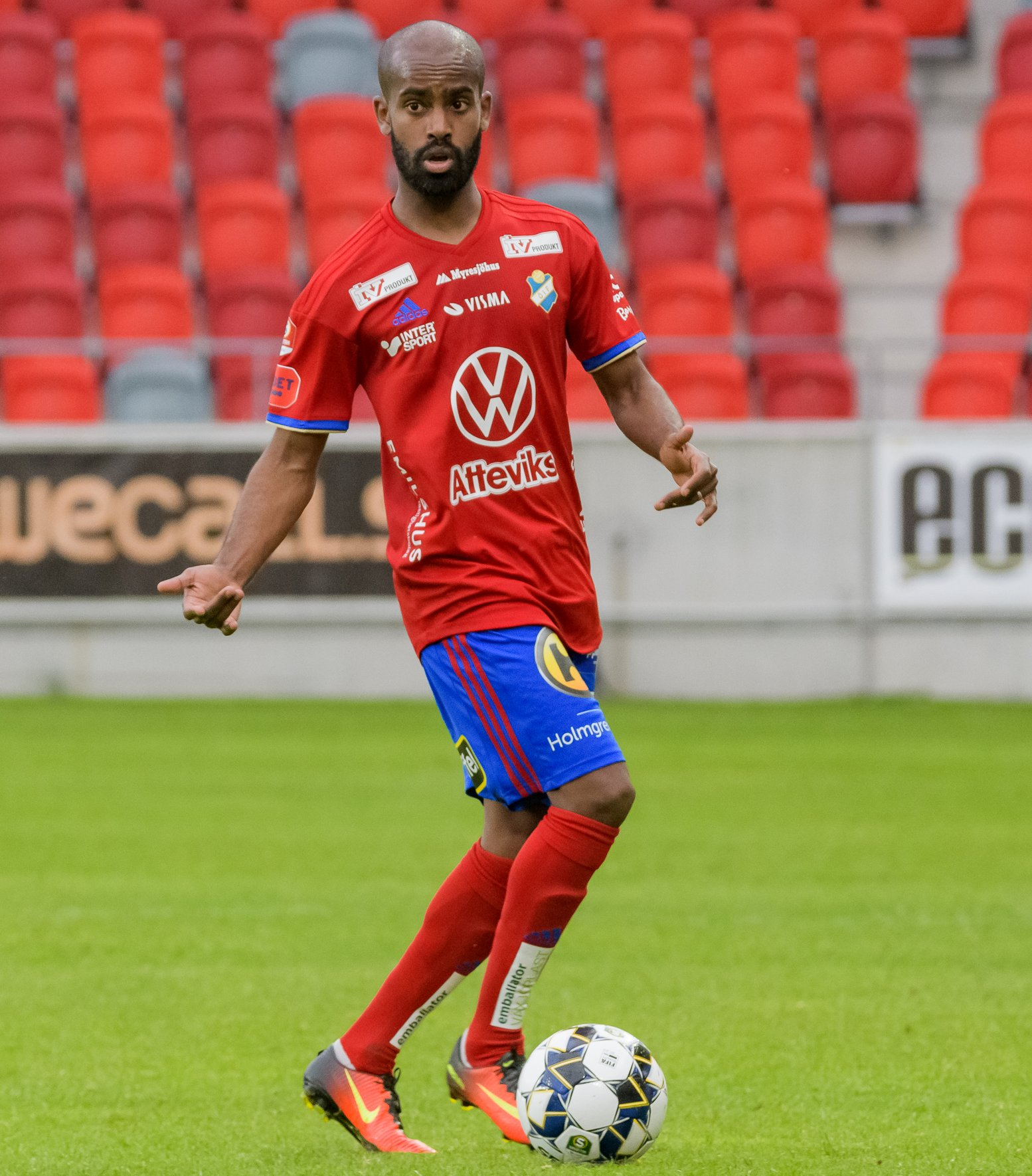

Personal information
- Date of birth: 3 July 1988 (age 38)
- Place of birth: Ljungby, Sweden
- Height: 1.73 m (5 ft 8 in)
- Position: Midfielder

Team information
- Current team: Assyriska United

Youth career
- Fisksätra IF
- –2003: Järla IF
- 2003–2006: AIK

Senior career*
Years	Team	Apps	(Gls)
2007	Väsby United		
2008–2010	Värmdö IF	65	(19)
2011–2012	Dalkurd FF	52	(5)
2013–2014	Östersunds FK	49	(5)
2015–2016	Åtvidabergs FF	57	(11)
2017–2018	Dalkurd FF	45	(6)
2019	Syrianska FC	26	(5)
2020	Östers IF	12	(0)
2021–	Assyriska United	0	(0)
- * Club domestic league appearances and goals as of 21 November 2020

Ammar Ahmed (Arabic: عَمَّار أَحْمَد; born 3 July 1988) is a Swedish professional footballer who plays as a midfielder for Assyriska United.

== Career ==
Ahmed was born in Ljungby, Sweden, and played youth football with Fisksätra IF, Järla IF and AIK Ungdom, where he was given a "Player of the Year"-award in 2006. His professional career started with Väsby United in 2007 and after one year he moved to Värmdö IF and later to Dalkurd FF in 2011. After two years at Dalkurd FF he moved further up the league system to Östersunds FK in 2013, to play there for two more years, before moving up to the Swedish top tier, Allsvenskan, when signing for Åtvidabergs FF for the 2015 season.

Ahmed left Dalkurd FF at the end of 2018, where he played since January 2017.

== Personal life ==
Ahmed was born in Ljungby, Sweden to Eritrean parents.

== Career statistics ==
As of match played 16 May 2015

Club	Season	League			National Cup		Total	
Club	Season	Division	Apps	Goals	Apps	Goals	Apps	Goals
Väsby United	2007	Division 1 Norra	?	?	?	?	?	?
Värmdö IF	2008	Division 3 S Svealand	22	11	–		22	11
Värmdö IF	2009	Division 2 S Svealand	22	7	–		22	7
Värmdö IF	2010	Division 2 S Svealand	21	1	?	?	21	1
Värmdö IF	Total		65	19	?	?	65	19
Dalkurd FF	2011	Division 1 Norra	26	2	–		26	2
Dalkurd FF	2012	Division 1 Norra	26	3	–		26	3
Dalkurd FF	Total		52	5	–		52	5
Östersunds FK	2013	Superettan	29	4	0	0	29	4
Östersunds FK	2014	Superettan	20	1	3	1	23	2
Östersunds FK	Total		49	5	3	1	52	6
Åtvidabergs FF	2015	Allsvenskan	8	0	0	0	8	0
Career total			174	29	3	1	177	30

== Honours ==
=== Individual ===
- AIK Ungdom Player of the Year: 2006

== See also ==
- 2015 Allsvenskan
- Åtvidabergs FF
