= Alaa Gatea =

Iraqi footballer (born 1987)

Personal information
- Full name: Alaa Gatea
- Date of birth: 3 May 1987 (age 39)
- Place of birth: Iraq
- Position: Goalkeeper

Senior career*
Years	Team	Apps	(Gls)
2006–2007	Al-Talaba		
2007–2011	Najaf		
2011–2013	Duhok		
2013–2019	Al-Zawraa		
2019–2020	Amanat Baghdad		
2020–2023	Al-Zawraa		

International career^{‡}
2009	Iraq	1	(0)

Managerial career
- 2025–: Al-Zawraa (Goalkeeping coach)
- * Club domestic league appearances and goals as of N/A ‡ National team caps and goals as of 13 July 2019

Alaa Gatea (Arabic: عَلَاء كَاطِع; born 3 May 1987) is a former Iraqi football goalkeeper and currently the goalkeeping coach for Al-Zawraa.

== Honours ==
=== Club ===
Al-Zawraa

- Iraqi Premier League: 2015–16, 2017–18
- Iraq FA Cup: 2016–17, 2018–19
- Iraqi Super Cup: 2017, 2021
