= Franco (footballer, born 1987) =

Brazilian footballer

Personal information
- Full name: Franco Alves de Souza
- Date of birth: 24 September 1987 (age 39)
- Place of birth: Rio de Janeiro, Brazil
- Height: 1.75 m (5 ft 9 in)
- Position: Midfielder

Senior career*
Years	Team	Apps	(Gls)
- Varginha (MG)
2006	Tombense		
2006–2008	Cardoso Moreira		
2008–2009	Sevojno	3	(0)
2009–2010	Pobeda		
2013–2014	Al Taibah		
2014–2015	Al-Jazeera		
2019	Masfut		
- * Club domestic league appearances and goals as of 7 September 2009

Franco Alves de Souza, known as Franco (born 24 September 1987), is a Brazilian former professional footballer who played as a midfielder.

In 2006, he played with Tombense Futebol Clube in the Campeonato Mineiro. He played with FK Sevojno in Serbia and FK Pobeda in Macedonia. In 2014, he joined Jordanian club Al-Jazeera (Amman).
