= Makadji Boukar =

Cameroonian footballer (born 1984)

Personal information
- Date of birth: January 19, 1984 (age 42)
- Place of birth: Yaoundé, Cameroon
- Height: 1.75 m (5 ft 9 in)
- Position: Right back

Senior career*
Years	Team	Apps	(Gls)
2002–2005	Cotonsport Garoua	59	(6)
2005–2008	Sahel FC	73	(17)
2008–2009	Cotonsport Garoua	20	(3)
2009–2010	Al-Nahda	?	(6)
2010–2011	Nyíregyháza Spartacus	13	(0)
2011–2012	Vasas SC	2	(0)
2012	Felda United FC	2	(1)
2012–2014	Al-Quwa Al-Jawiya		(5)
2014–2015	Al-Shorta		(0)
2015	Al-Zawraa		(0)

International career
2010–	Cameroon	1	(0)
- * Club domestic league appearances and goals as of 22 January 2016

Makadji Boukar (born January 19, 1984, in Yaoundé) is a professional Cameroonian footballer who most recently played for Al-Zawraa in the Iraqi Premier League. Boukar previously played for Vasas SC in the Soproni Liga.

== Career ==
Boukar began his career by Cotonsport Garoua and moved 2005 to Sahel FC and in 2008 he returned to his motherclub.

On 2 December 2010, he signed for Hungarian club Nyíregyháza Spartacus.

In February 2012, Boukar joined the Malaysian club, Felda United FC. In April 2012 he was released by the club.
