= Ibrahim Salim Saad =

Iraqi footballer (born 1972)

Personal information
- Date of birth: 1972 (age 53–54)
- Place of birth: Baghdad, Iraq
- Position: Goalkeeper

Team information
- Current team: Al-Talaba (goalkeeper coach)

Senior career*
Years	Team	Apps	(Gls)
1988–1990	Al-Shorta		
1990–1991	Al-Karkh		
1991–1993	Al-Shorta		
1993–1994	Salahaddin		(1)
1994–1995	Al-Karkh		(3)
1995–1996	Al-Quwa Al-Jawiya		
1996–1997	Al-Zawraa		
1997–1999	Al-Shorta		
1999–2000	Salahaddin		
2000–2001	Al-Talaba		
2001	Dubočica	12	(0)
2001	Riada Wal Adab		
2001–2002	Erbil		
2002	Al-Wehda		

International career
1993–1995	Iraq	5	(0)

Managerial career
- 2019: Al-Talaba (goalkeeper coach)
- 2021–: Al-Talaba (goalkeeper coach)
- * Club domestic league appearances and goals

Ibrahim Salim Saad (Arabic: إِبْرَاهِيم سَالِم سَعْد; born 1972) is an Iraqi former footballer who played as a goalkeeper.

== Club career ==
In the 1990s, Salim Saad was playing in Lebanon, before returning to Iraq where he played first at Salahaddin and, after one season, moved to Al-Talaba. In the winter-break of the 2000–01 season, Salim Saad went to FR Yugoslavia and played half a season in the Second League club Dubočica from Leskovac, where he had 12 league appearances. In 2001, he signed for Erbil, before moving, in 2002 to Yemen to represent the capital Sanaa club Al-Wahda.

== International career ==
Salim Saad was a part of the Iraq national team. Among others, he participated in the "Agony of Doha" match, held in Doha, Qatar on 28 October 1993, between Iraq and Japan, It was a qualification game for the 1994 FIFA World Cup, that finished in a 2–2 draw, and in which Saad was the Iraqi goalkeeper. Iraq ended up not qualifying. He also played in the same qualifiers against North Korea Saudi Arabia and Iran.
