= Ahmed Magdy Elhusseiny =

Egyptian footballer (born 1989)

Ahmed Magdy
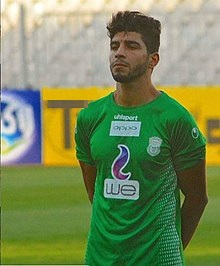

Personal information
- Full name: Ahmed Magdy Elhusseiny Mahmoud
- Date of birth: 23 April 1989 (age 37)
- Place of birth: Giza, Egypt
- Height: 1.85 m (6 ft 1 in)
- Positions: Defender; defensive midfielder

Youth career
- 2006–2011: Wadi Degla SC
- 2011–2012: Etisalat

Senior career*
Years	Team	Apps	(Gls)
2012-2014	Wadi Degla SC	20	(8)
2013	→ KFC Turnhout (loan)	5	(3)
2014-2017	Petrojet SC	150	(10)
2016–2017	→ Al-Shorta SC (loan)	19	(2)
2017 - 2018	Petrojet SC	10	(5)
2018 - 2019	Al Ittihad Alexandria Club	30	(11)
2019- Present	El Entag El Harby SC	15	(3)
- * Club domestic league appearances and goals

Ahmed Magdy Elhusseiny Mahmoud (born 23 April 1989 in Giza) is an Egyptian professional football player. Magdy is currently playing as a defensive midfielder with El Entag El Harby SC in Egyptian Premier League. He debuted with Egypt U23, the national team of Egypt Under-23 administered by the Egyptian Football Association.

In 2013, Wadi Degla SC loaned him to Belgian Football team KFC Turnhout. Later in the Iraqi Premier League he helped Al-Shorta SC to third place in the Championship in 2017. He has then played for several teams in Egyptian Premier League such as for Petrojet SC, Al Ittihad Alexandria Club, Wadi Degla SC. Ahmed Magdy is the twin brother of professional football player, Mohamed Magdy Elhusseiny Mahmoud.
