= Marwan Hussein =

Iraqi footballer (born 1992)

Personal information
- Full name: Marwan Hussein Hassan Al-Ajeeli
- Date of birth: 26 January 1992 (age 34)
- Place of birth: Baghdad, Iraq
- Height: 1.89 m (6 ft 2 1/2 in)
- Position: Centre forward

Team information
- Current team: Newroz
- Number: 8

Senior career*
Years	Team	Apps	(Gls)
2007–2008	Al-Adala		
2008–2014	Al-Zawraa	56	(33)
2014–2015	Al-Shorta	21	(15)
2015–2016	Al-Khaleej	4	(1)
2016–2017	Al-Shorta	39	(18)
2017–2018	Sepahan	15	(2)
2018	Al-Zawraa	0	(0)
2018–2019	Al-Talaba		(23)
2019–2021	Al-Shorta	21	(5)
2021	Al-Naft		(1)
2021–2022	Erbil		(3)
2022–2023	Al-Najaf		(1)
2023	Al-Talaba		(3)
2023–	Newroz		(41)

International career
2008–2009	Iraq U17	?	(?)
2009–2010	Iraq U20	1	(0)
2014–2015	Iraq U23	7	(5)
2014–2015	Iraq	12	(0)
- * Club domestic league appearances and goals as of 21 November 2026

Marwan Hussein Hassan Al-Ajeeli (Arabic: مَرْوَان حُسَيْن حَسَن الْعَجِيلِيّ; born 26 January 1992) is an Iraqi professional footballer as a centre forward, who plays for Newroz in the Iraqi Premier League and the Iraq national team.

== Club career ==
=== Al Zawraa ===
In 2009, at the age of 18, Marwan Hussein made his debut for Baghdad giants Al-Zawraa. He helped Al-Zawraa win the Iraqi League 2010–11.

=== Al Shorta ===
In the summer of 2014, he moved to Al-Shorta. where he finished the season as the league's top goal scorer. His performances attracted many clubs from abroad, and he moved to play in Saudi Arabia the following season.

=== Al Khaleej ===
In the summer of 2015. Marwan signed contract with the Saudi Premier League club Al-Khaleej. He played 6 times (425) minute for League and cup and scoring 2 goals and 2 assist. in October Injury then ended his contract.

=== Al Shorta ===
In Jan 2016, Marwan returned to the Iraqi Premier League as he signed a contract with his former club Al-Shorta. Al Shorta finished 7th in his first season back. The following season, Marwan was instrumental in challenging for the title, he scoring 15 goals, however the team lost in the very last round and finished third. He moved straight after the end of the long season to Iran league, without a rest.

=== Sepahan ===
On 13 July 2017, it was announced Marwan would join the Iran Pro League club Sepahan. He was presented to the media on 12 August, after the end of his season in Iraq. He played his first match for Sepahan in Isfahan derby against Zob Ahan, helped in 2–0 win, after that replaced Hossein Papi in 64th minute. Marwan scored his first goal against Persepolis in a 2–2 draw, in match knowing as Iran's El Clasico. After the absence from participation in the matches. returned Marwan against Sepidrood Rasht and scored his second goal for the club in 90th minute, replaced for Mehdi Sharifi in 81st minute. After the loss, the president resigned, and the coach was sacked, and an interim coach was appointed. However, the interim coach did not start a game for Foolad. After he was appointed as the new coach, he was excluded from participating in the next game against Persepolis, despite scoring the latest goals against Persepolis in home and against Sepidrood in the last round. Because of the administrative & technical changes, and bad results and their psychological reflection. None of the six foreign professionals were continued due to the overall situation of the team suffer that almost collapse. He playing 16 match (725) minute in the league and cup, scoring 2 goals and 1 assists. His team finished 14th in the league.

=== Al Talaba ===
In September 2018, Marwan joined Al-Talaba SC. He scored a goal and showed a clear excel in the derby Baghdad match against Al-Zawraa.

== International club statistics ==
With clubs Al-Zawraa and Al-Shorta played (580) minute in AFC Cup scoring (5 goals).

== International career ==
He made his senior international debut in a friendly match against North Korea national football team on 21 February 2014.

Marwan was part of the final 23 man squad that finished 4th in the 2015 AFC Asian Cup.

=== Iraq U-23 ===
Marwan played for Iraq national team under-23 (680) minute scoring (5 goals).

=== Iraq U-23 goals ===
Scores and results list Iraq's goal tally first.

Goal	Date	Venue	Opponent	Score	Result	Competition
1.	12 January 2014	Al-Seeb Stadium, Muscat, Oman	Saudi Arabia	2–0	3–1	2013 AFC U-22 Championship
2.	12 January 2014	Al-Seeb Stadium, Muscat, Oman	Saudi Arabia	3–0	3–1	2013 AFC U-22 Championship
3.	14 January 2014	Al-Seeb Stadium, Muscat, Oman	Uzbekistan	1–0	2–1	2013 AFC U-22 Championship
4.	16 January 2014	Royal Oman Stadium, Muscat, Oman	China	1–0	1–0	2013 AFC U-22 Championship
5.	21 September 2014	Goyang Stadium, Goyang, South Korea	Kuwait	3–0	3–0	2014 Asian Games

== Style of play ==
Marwan is a physically strong and aggressive striker. He had scored 8 goals in 15 matches so far in the Iraqi Premier League 2025/2026 season; putting him in the top 20 scorers of the whole Iraqi Premier League. He has been described as a "modern striker".

== Honours ==
Al-Zawraa

- Iraqi Premier League: 2010–11

Al-Shorta

- Iraqi Super Cup: 2019

Iraq

- 2015 AFC Asian Cup: fourth place

Iraq U23

- 2013 AFC U-22 Championship: winner
- Football at the 2014 Asian Games: third place

Individual

- 2014–15 Iraqi Premier League: Top scorer (15 goals)
