= Haidar Aboodi =

Iraqi footballer

Personal information
- Full name: Haidar Aboudi Hantosh
- Date of birth: 26 March 1987 (age 39)
- Place of birth: Iraq
- Position: Defender

Team information
- Current team: Al-Najaf FC (manager)

Senior career*
| Years | Team | Apps | (Gls) |
| 2000–2008 | Najaf FC | | |
| 2008–2009 | Ahli Al-Fujairah | 0 | (0) |
| 2009–2010 | Baghdad FC | | |
| 2010–2011 | Talaba SC | | |
| 2011–2016 | Najaf FC | | |
| 2016 | Naft Al-Wasat | | |

International career^{‡}
| 2007 | Iraq | 4 | (0) |

Managerial career
- 2020–2021: Al-Najaf FC (assist. coach)
- 2021: Al-Najaf FC (caretaker)
- 2021–: Al-Najaf FC (assist. coach)
- 2021–: Al-Najaf FC
- * Club domestic league appearances and goals as of December 10, 2006 ‡ National team caps and goals as of December 10, 2006

Haeder Aboudi (Arabic: حيدر عبودي) (born 1986) is an Iraqi former footballer who played as a defender for Najaf FC and the Iraq national football team.

== Managerial statistics ==
As of match played 26 December 2021

Managerial record by team and tenure
| Team | From | To | Record | | | | | Ref. |
| Team | From | To | P | W | D | L | Win % | Ref. |
|---|---|---|---|---|---|---|---|---|
| Al-Najaf FC (caretaker) | 1 January 2021 | 17 January 2021 | 2 | 1 | 1 | 0 | 50.0 | |
| Al-Najaf FC | 21 October 2021 | Present | 12 | 7 | 1 | 4 | 58.3 | |
| Total | | | 14 | 8 | 2 | 4 | 57.1 | — |

== Honours ==
=== Country ===
- 2006 Asian Games Silver medallist.
