= Abbas Attiya =

Iraqi footballer and coach

Personal information
- Full name: Abbas Attiya Zwair
- Date of birth: August 25, 1969 (age 57)
- Position: Defender

Team information
- Current team: Karbala SC (Manager)

International career
Years	Team	Apps	(Gls)
1988–1989	Iraq U20		
1988–1990	Iraq		

Managerial career
- 2015: Al-Quwa Al-Jawiya
- 2015–2016: Iraq U20
- 2015: Al-Karkh
- 2016–2018: Al-Kahrabaa
- 2018: Al-Sinaat Al-Kahrabaiya
- 2018–2021: Al-Kahrabaa
- 2021: Al-Kahrabaa (Technical Advisor)
- 2021: Al-Hudood
- 2022–: Karbala SC

Abbas Attiya Zwair (born 25 August 1969), commonly known as Abbas Attiya, is a football coach and former Iraqi player, who is currently a coach of Al-Kahrabaa FC.

== Manager career ==
Attiya led Al-Sinaat Al-Kahrabaiya in the beginning of the 2018-2019 season. He left the team for Al-Kahrabaa FC.

== Statistics ==
=== Managerial statistics ===
As of 19 July 2022

Team	Nat	From	To	Record				
Team	Nat	From	To	G	W	D	L	Win %
Al-Quwa Al-Jawiya	(Iraq)	20 February 2015	28 July 2015	13	6	6	1	46.15
Iraq U20	(Iraq)	11 August 2015	24 October 2016	13	7	6	0	53.85
Al-Karkh	(Iraq)	21 October 2015	24 October 2015	0	0	0	0	—
Al-Kahrabaa	(Iraq)	3 November 2016	23 March 2018	58	20	20	18	34.48
Al-Sinaat Al-Kahrabaiya	(Iraq)	23 July 2018	6 November 2018	7	1	2	4	14.29
Al-Kahrabaa	(Iraq)	7 November 2018	11 April 2021	94	26	40	28	27.66
Al-Hudood	(Iraq)	21 June 2021	9 October 2021	7	2	1	4	28.57
Karbala SC	(Iraq)	19 July 2022	""Present""	0	0	0	0	—
Total				191	61	75	55	31.94

== Honours ==
=== Club ===
Al-Quwa Al-Jawiya

- (Runner Up) Iraqi Premier League: 2014–15

Al-Kahrabaa FC

- (Runner Up) Iraq FA Cup: 2018–19

Al-Hudood SC

- (Champions) Iraqi First Division League: 2021–22

=== Country ===
Iraq U20

- Qualified for 2016 AFC U-19 Championship: 2016
- Quarter Final at 2016 AFC U-19 Championship: 2016 Lost to Saudi Arabia U20
