= Haitham Kadhim =

Iraqi footballer

Personal information
- Full name: Haitham Kadhim Tahir
- Date of birth: 21 July 1983 (age 43)
- Place of birth: Iraq
- Positions: Defensive midfielder; central midfielder

Team information
- Current team: Al-Quwa Al-Jawiya (Board Member)

Youth career
- Al-Naft

Senior career*
Years	Team	Apps	(Gls)
2002–2004	Al-Zawraa		
2004	Al-Shabab		
2004–2006	Al-Zawraa		
2006–2007	Erbil		
2007	Al-Baqa'a		
2007–2008	Al-Quwa Al-Jawiya		
2008	Sepahan	3	(0)
2008–2009	Esteghlal Ahvaz	5	(1)
2009–2016	Al-Quwa Al-Jawiya		

International career^{‡}
2003–2009	Iraq	65	(0)
2013	Iraq Military	9	(0)
Medal record
Men's football
Representing Iraq
AFC Asian Cup
Winner	2007 Indonesia/Malaysia/ Thailand/Vietnam
- * Club domestic league appearances and goals as of 17 May 2008 ‡ National team caps and goals as of 12 July 2013

Haitham Kadhim Tahir (Arabic: هَيْثَم كَاظِم طَاهِر; born 21 July 1983) is an Iraqi retired football midfielder who last played for the Al-Quwa Al-Jawiya football club.

== Information ==
After winning the Iraq league title with Al Zawraa, Haitham Kadhim moved to Arbil FC in August 2006. He has been named in the senior national team on several occasions.

== Honours ==
=== Club ===
Al-Zawraa

- Iraqi Premier League: 2005–06

Erbil

- Iraqi Premier League: 2006–07

Al-Quwa Al-Jawiya

- Iraq FA Cup: 2015–16

=== Country ===
- 2005 West Asian Games Gold medallist.
- 2007 Asian Cup winner
- 2013 CISM World Football Trophy: Champions
