= 2013 CISM World Football Trophy =

Tournament details
- Host country: Azerbaijan
- City: Baku
- Dates: 2 July - 14 July
- Teams: 16
- Venues: 4 (in 1 host city)

Final positions
- Champions: Iraq (4th title)
- Runners-up: Oman
- Third place: Ivory Coast
- Fourth place: Azerbaijan

Tournament statistics
- Matches played: 32
- Goals scored: 104 (3.25 per match)
- Top scorer: (Iraq) Hammadi Ahmad (9 goals)
- Best player: (Oman) Abdulaziz Al-Muqbali

The 2013 CISM World Football Trophy take part in Baku, capital of Azerbaijan. It's the first edition of the new format in additional to the Military World Championship.

== Qualification ==
=== Asia Zone ===
Team	Pld	W	D	L	GF	GA	GD	Pts
Oman	4	2	2	0	4	2	+2	8
Qatar	4	1	2	1	1	2	–1	5
Iraq	4	1	1	2	4	4	0	4
Bahrain	4	0	4	0	2	2	0	4
Iran	4	1	1	2	1	2	–1	4

Kazakhstan withdrew.

11 February 2013

Qatar	0 – 0	Oman

Al-Seeb Stadium, Seeb
11 February 2013

Iraq	1 – 1	Bahrain

Al-Seeb Stadium, Seeb
13 February 2013

Iraq	2 – 0	Qatar

Al-Seeb Stadium, Seeb
13 February 2013

Oman	1 – 0	Iran

Al-Seeb Stadium, Seeb
15 February 2013

Iran	1 – 0	Iraq

Al-Seeb Stadium, Seeb
15 February 2013

Qatar	0 – 0	Bahrain

Al-Seeb Stadium, Seeb
17 February 2013

Iran	0 – 0	Bahrain

Al-Seeb Stadium, Seeb
17 February 2013

Oman	2 – 1	Iraq

Al-Seeb Stadium, Seeb
19 February 2013

Qatar	1 – 0	Iran

Al-Seeb Stadium, Seeb
20 February 2013

Bahrain	1 – 1	Oman

Al-Seeb Stadium, Seeb

==== Awards ====
- Top scorer: (Oman) Hashim Saleh (3 goals)
- Best player: (Iraq) Humam Tariq

== Group stage ==
=== Group A ===
Team	Pld	W	D	L	GF	GA	GD	Pts
Azerbaijan	3	3	0	0	9	0	+9	9
Iraq	3	2	0	1	11	3	+8	6
Mali	3	1	0	2	6	8	–2	3
Canada	3	0	0	3	0	15	–15	0

2 July 2013

Azerbaijan	4 – 0	Mali

Dalga Arena, Baku
3 July 2013

Iraq	7 – 0	Canada
Saad 33'; H. Ahmad 63', 86', 89'; Karim 70', 75'; Abdul-Amir 83'

Bayil Stadium, Baku
Referee: Kouame N’Dri (Ivory Coast)

5 July 2013

Iraq	4 – 0	Mali
H. Ahmad 5', 55', 62'; Karim 84'

Dalga Arena, Baku
5 July 2013

Azerbaijan	2 – 0	Canada

Bayil Stadium, Baku

8 July 2013

Azerbaijan	3 – 0	Iraq

Dalga Arena, Baku
Referee: Mohamadou Mal Souley (Cameroon)
8 July 2013

Mali	6 – 0	Canada

Bayil Stadium, Baku
Referee: Jameel Juma Abdulhusain (Bahrein)

=== Group B ===
Team	Pld	W	D	L	GF	GA	GD	Pts
Algeria	3	2	1	0	7	2	+5	7
Bahrain	3	1	2	0	2	0	+2	5
France	3	0	2	1	3	6	–3	2
Kenya	3	0	1	2	3	7	–4	1

3 July 2013

Algeria	0 – 0	Bahrain

Dalga Arena, Baku
Referee: Aliyar Agayev (Azerbaijan)
3 July 2013

Kenya	2 – 2	France

Dalga Arena, Baku

5 July 2013

France	0 – 0	Bahrain

Shafa Stadium, Baku
Referee: Falah Abid Saad (Iraq)
5 July 2013

Algeria	3 – 1	Kenya
Berchiche 25'; Bendebka 43'; Amroune 90'		Waruru 88'

Zire Stadium, Baku
Referee: Marcelo de Lima (Brasil)

8 July 2013

Algeria	4 – 1	France
Amroune 22'; Madi 32'; El Ogbi 77', 86'		? 60'

Shafa Stadium, Baku
Referee: Abdullah Balideh (Qatar)
8 July 2013

Bahrain	2 – 0	Kenya

Zire Stadium, Baku
Referee: Bader Benlamkadden (Netherlands)

=== Group C ===
Team	Pld	W	D	L	GF	GA	GD	Pts
Oman	3	3	0	0	11	3	+8	9
Ivory Coast	3	2	0	1	5	2	+3	6
United States	3	1	0	2	6	7	–1	3
Germany	3	0	0	3	1	11	–10	0

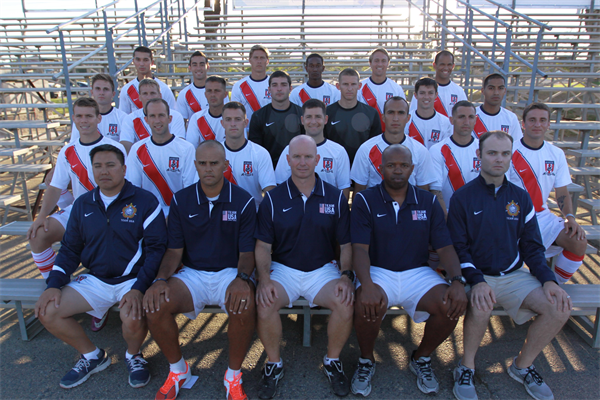
Team USA

3 July 2013

Oman	5 – 0	Germany

Shafa Stadium, Baku
3 July 2013

Ivory Coast	2 – 0	United States

Shafa Stadium, Baku

6 July 2013

Oman	4 – 2	United States

Dalga Arena, Baku
6 July 2013

Ivory Coast	2 – 0	Germany

Shafa Stadium, Baku

8 July 2013

Oman	2 – 1	Ivory Coast

Dalga Arena, Baku
Referee: Aliyar Agayev (Azerbaijan)
8 July 2013

Germany	1 – 4	United States

Shafa Stadium, Baku
Referee: Richard Obare (Kenya)

=== Group D ===
Team	Pld	W	D	L	GF	GA	GD	Pts
Cameroon	3	3	0	0	5	1	+4	9
Qatar	3	2	0	1	3	2	+1	6
Brazil	3	1	0	2	5	4	+1	3
Netherlands	3	0	0	3	1	7	–6	0

3 July 2013

Brazil	0 – 1	Qatar

Zire Stadium, Baku
Referee: Rahim Hasanov (Azerbaijan)
3 July 2013

Netherlands	0 – 1	Cameroon

Zire Stadium, Baku

6 July 2013

Netherlands	0 – 1	Qatar

Shafa Stadium, Baku
6 July 2013

Brazil	0 – 2	Cameroon

Zire Stadium, Baku
Referee: Aliyar Agayev (Azerbaijan)

8 July 2013

Brazil	5 – 1	Netherlands

Shafa Stadium, Baku
Referee: Omar Mubarak Al-Yaquobi (Oman)
8 July 2013

Qatar	1 – 2	Cameroon

Zire Stadium, Baku
Referee: Rahim Hasanov (Azerbaijan)

== Knockout stage ==
Quarter-finals
10 July – Dalga Arena
Azerbaijan (a.e.t.)	3
Bahrain	2
10 July – Bayil Stadium
Oman	3
Qatar	0
10 July – Shafa Stadium
Algeria	1
Iraq	2
10 July – Zire Stadium
Cameroon	1
Ivory Coast	2

Semi-finals
12 July – Dalga Arena
Azerbaijan	1
Oman	2
12 July – Bayil Stadium
Iraq	3
Ivory Coast	0

Final
14 July – Dalga Arena
Oman	2
Iraq	3
Third place
14 July – Dalga Arena
Azerbaijan	0
Ivory Coast	1

=== Quarterfinals ===
10 July 2013

Azerbaijan	3 – 2 (a.e.t.)	Bahrain

Dalga Arena, Baku
10 July 2013

Algeria	1 – 2	Iraq
Amroune 52' (pen.)		M. Ahmad 60'; H. Ahmad 74'

Bayil Stadium, Baku
10 July 2013

Oman	3 – 0	Qatar

Shafa Stadium, Baku
Referee: Kouame N’Dri (Ivory Coast)
10 July 2013

Cameroon	1 – 2	Ivory Coast

Zire Stadium, Baku
Referee: Marcelo de Lima (Brasil)

=== Semifinals ===
12 July 2013

Azerbaijan	1 – 2	Oman

Dalga Arena, Baku
Referee: Falah Abid Saad (Iraq)
12 July 2013

Iraq	3 – 0	Ivory Coast
Karim 65', 75'; M. Ahmad 90'

Bayil Stadium, Baku
Referee: Abdullah Balideh (Qatar)

=== Third place match ===
14 July 2013

Azerbaijan	0 – 1	Ivory Coast

Dalga Arena, Baku
Referee: Badr Benlamkadden (Netherlands)

=== The Final ===
14 July 2013

Oman	2 – 3	Iraq
Al-Muqbali 16', 51'		Karim 49'; H. Ahmad 58', 87'

Dalga Arena, Baku
Referee: Rahim Hasanov (Azerbaijan)

== Winner ==
2013 CISM World Football Trophy

Iraq
4th title

== Awards ==
- Top scorer: (Iraq) Hammadi Ahmad (9 goals)
- Best player: (Oman) Abdulaziz Al-Muqbali
- Best goalkeeper: (Azerbaijan) Aqil Mammadov
- Fair game footballer: (Azerbaijan) Nodar Mammadov
- Fair play team: Azerbaijan
