= Ali Abdul-Jabbar =

Iraqi footballer and coach

Personal information
- Date of birth: 1 January 1985 (age 41)
- Place of birth: Iraq

Senior career*
Years	Team	Apps	(Gls)
2013–2015	Duhok SC		
2015–2017	Al-Talaba		
2017–2019	Al-Quwa Al-Jawiya		

Managerial career
- 2022–2023/24: Al-Qasim SC
- 2025: Al-Najaf FC
- 2026: Naft Maysan SC
- * Club domestic league appearances and goals

Ali Abdul-Jabbar is a former Iraqi footballer and coach. He primarily played for the Al-Quwa Al-Jawiya before retiring and became a manager for the same team. He later retired from coaching in 2026.

== Personal life ==
Ali Abdul-Jabbar was born in Iraq in September 15, 1983.

== Club career ==
Jabbar joined Duhok SC in 2013, Al-Talaba in 2015, and finally Al-Quwa Al-Jawiya in 2017.

== Coaching career ==
In 2022, Abdul-Jabbar was appointed head coach of Al-Qasim. He then managed Al-Najaf FC and Naft Maysan SC in the 2025 and 2026 season respectively.
