= Waleed Bahar =

Iraqi Defender

Personal information
- Full name: Waleed Bahar Mousa
- Date of birth: 27 April 1991 (age 35)
- Place of birth: Iraq
- Height: 1.82 m (6 ft 0 in)
- Position: Defender

Team information
- Current team: Al-Jazeera

Senior career*
Years	Team	Apps	(Gls)
2010	Al-Naft		
2010–2012	Al-Shorta		
2012–2013	Al-Quwa Al-Jawiya		
2013–2014	Al-Naft		
2014–2015	Al-Talaba		
2015	Al-Naft		
2015	Al-Quwa Al-Jawiya		
2015–2016	Al-Shorta		
2016–2017	Amanat Baghdad		
2017–2018	Al-Talaba		
2018–2019	Erbil		
2019–2020	Al-Samawa		
2022–2023	Al-Jazeera		

International career^{‡}
2009–2010	Iraq U20	3	(0)
2011–2012	Iraq U23	4	
2012	Iraq	6	(0)
- * Club domestic league appearances and goals ‡ National team caps and goals as of October 16, 2012

Waleed Bahar Mousa (Arabic: وَلِيد بَحْر مُوسَى; born 27 April 1991) is a former Iraqi defender. Bahar last played with Jordanian club Al-Jazeera and has played for the Iraq national football team.

== Honours ==
=== Country ===
Iraq

- 2012 Arab Nations Cup: Bronze medallist

Iraq Military

- 2013 CISM World Football Trophy: Champions
