= Mustafa Karim =

Iraqi footballer (born 1987)

Personal information
- Full name: Mustafa Karim Abdullah
- Date of birth: 21 July 1987 (age 39)
- Place of birth: Baghdad, Iraq
- Height: 1.76 m (5 ft 9 in)
- Position: Striker

Team information
- Current team: Ghaz Al-Shamal (manager)

Youth career
- 1999–2002: Al-Sulaikh

Senior career*
| Years | Team | Apps | (Gls) |
| 2002–2003 | Al-Talaba | | (0) |
| 2003–2005 | Al-Kahraba | 24 | (16) |
| 2005–2006 | Al-Shorta | 19 | (14) |
| 2006–2007 | Erbil | 13 | (7) |
| 2007–2009 | Al-Ismaily | 52 | (21) |
| 2009–2010 | Al-Sharjah | 10 | (8) |
| 2010 | Al-Sailiya | 2 | (2) |
| 2010–2011 | Baniyas | 10 | (3) |
| 2011–2012 | Al-Ittihad Al-Iskandary | 55 | (29) |
| 2012 | Erbil | | (0) |
| 2012–2013 | Al-Quwa Al-Jawiya | | (18) |
| 2013–2014 | Al-Shorta | | (7) |
| 2014–2015 | Al-Quwa Al-Jawiya | | (7) |
| 2015 | Al-Muharraq | | (2) |
| 2015–2017 | Naft Al-Wasat | | (7) |
| 2017 | Al-Zawraa | | (3) |
| 2017–2018 | Al-Talaba | | (0) |
| 2018 | Al-Minaa | 13 | (8) |
| 2018 | Naft Al-Wasat | | (0) |
| 2018–2020 | Amanat Baghdad | | (17) |
| 2020–2021 | Al-Sinaat Al-Kahrabaiya | | (0) |
| 2021 | Al-Talaba | | (2) |
| Total | | – | (169) |

International career^{‡}
| 2006 | Iraq U17 | 1 | (1) |
| 2006–2007 | Iraq U23 | 7 | (8) |
| 2008 | Iraq U20 | 2 | (1) |
| 2008–2013 | Iraq | 48 | (8) |

Managerial career
- 2023: Al-Jolan
- 2024–: Ghaz Al-Shamal
Medal record
Representing Iraq
CISM World Football Trophy
| Winner | 2013 Azerbaijan |
- * Club domestic league appearances and goals as of June 12, 2018 ‡ National team caps and goals as of July 14, 2013

Mustafa Karim Abdullah (Arabic: مُصْطَفَى كَرِيم عَبْد الله; born 21 July 1987) is an Iraqi football manager and former player. He played as striker, and was known for his ability to score with both feet.

== Career: Youth, Olympic and National Team ==
=== Youth Team ===
In 2005, Mustafa Karim took part with Iraq Youth team in the AFC Youth Championship Qualification, scored the qualifying goal against Kuwait and sent Iraq to the AFC Youth Championship 2006, but he couldn't join the team due to injury.

=== Olympic Team ===
In 2006, Mustafa Karim won the silver medal in the Asian Games with Iraq Olympic team. Mustafa Karim scored 4 goals in the Asian Games, 2 goals against Indonesia and one goal against Singapore in the 1st Round, while his fourth goal was the most precious goal against Malaysia, Iraq was leading the match 3–0 against Malaysia and Iraq needed a 4–0 win to qualify to the quarterfinals as the best second place runner, Mustafa Karim substituted in and scored the 4th goal from the first touch to send the Iraq Olympic team to the quarterfinals.

In 2007, Iraq Olympic team failed to qualify to the 2008 Olympic Games and finished behind Australia by 1 point, Mustafa Karim played most of the Olympic Games qualifications matches as substitution, and scored only 2 goals.

=== National Team ===
In 2008, Mustafa Karim made his debut to the Iraq national team in a friendly match against Jordan On 24 January 2008.

== Al Zawraa ==
Mustafa Karim Signed for Iraqi champions Al Zawraa from Naft Al Wasat on the January transfer window of 2017. He made his debut as a second-half substitute Vs Al-Hedood and scored the winning goal in the dying moments of the match.

== Clubs Achievements ==
2004-2005

- Mustafa Karim won Iraqi League Top scorer award with 16 Goals, and he was only 17 years old.

2005-2006

- Mustafa Karim was the Iraqi League Top scorer runner-up with 14 Goals, and he was only 18 years old.

2006-2007

- Mustafa Karim won his first League title with Arbil FC.

2007-2008

- Mustafa Karim join the Egyptian giant club Ismaily SC
- Voted as best Foreign player in Egyptian Premier League 2007.

2008-2009

- Egyptian Premier League Top scorers runner-up with 11 Goals, 1 goal behind the Top scorers.
- Egyptian Premier League runner-up with Ismaily SC, had to play a play-off match against Al Ahly to decide the champion.

== International goals ==
Scores and results list Iraq's goal tally first.

| # | Date | Venue | Opponent | Score | Result | Competition |
|---|---|---|---|---|---|---|
| 1. | 29 September 2010 | King Abdullah Stadium, Amman | Palestine | 1–0 | 3-0 | 2010 WAFF Championship |
| 2. | 29 September 2010 | King Abdullah Stadium, Amman | Palestine | 2–0 | 3-0 | 2010 WAFF Championship |
| 3. | 1 October 2010 | King Abdullah Stadium, Amman | Iran | 1–1 | 1-2 | 2010 WAFF Championship |
| 4. | 11 November 2010 | Sharjah Stadium, Sharjah | India | 1–0 | 2-0 | Friendly |
| 5. | 16 July 2011 | Amman International Stadium, Amman | Jordan | 1–1 | 1-1 (4-5 pk) | 2011 Fochs Int. Football Tournament |
| 6. | 29 February 2012 | Grand Hamad Stadium, Doha | Singapore | 5–1 | 7-1 | 2014 FIFA World Cup qual. |
| 7. | 24 June 2012 | Prince Abdullah Al-Faisal Stadium, KSA | Lebanon | 1–0 | 1-0 | 2012 Arab Nations Cup |
| 8. | 3 July 2012 | Prince Abdullah Al-Faisal Stadium, KSA | Morocco | 1–2 | 1-2 | 2012 Arab Nations Cup |

== Honours ==
=== Country ===
- 2006 Asian Games Silver medallist.
- 2012 Arab Nations Cup Bronze medallist
- 2013 CISM World Football Trophy: Champions

=== Club ===
- Won the 2006–07 Iraqi Premier League with Erbil.
- Won the 2016–17 Iraq FA Cup with Al-Zawraa.

=== Individual ===
- 2004–05 Iraqi Premier League top scorer
- Best foreign player in the Egyptian Premier League in 2007
- 2016–17 Iraq FA Cup top scorer

Awards
| Preceded by (Iraq) Ali Mohammed | Runner-up Iraq League top scorer 2005-06 | Succeeded by (Iraq) Sahib Abbas |
