= Hussein Abdul-Wahid =

Hussein Abdul-Wahid is a given name. Notable people with the name include:

- Hussein Abdul-Wahid Waham (born 1985), Iraqi footballer
- Hussein Abdul-Wahid Khalaf (born 1993), Iraqi footballer

== See also ==
- Abdul Wahid
