= Hamdi Al Masri =

Syrian footballer (born 1986)

Personal information
- Full name: Hamdi Faisal Al Masri
- Date of birth: 7 April 1986 (age 40)
- Place of birth: Hamah, Syria
- Height: 1.87 m (6 ft 2 in)
- Position: Centre back

Team information
- Current team: Nawair SC
- Number: 4

Senior career*
| Years | Team | Apps | (Gls) |
| 2005–2010 | Nawair SC | | |
| 2010–2012 | Al-Wahda | | |
| 2012 | Al-Shorta (Damascus) | | |
| 2012–2013 | Al-Naft | 25 | (3) |
| 2013–2015 | Al-Shorta (Baghdad) | 20 | (2) |
| 2015 | Al-Muharraq | | |
| 2016 | Dhofar | | |
| 2016–2017 | Al-Shorta (Baghdad) | | |
| 2017–2018 | Al-Baqa'a | | |
| 2018–2019 | Tishreen SC | 32 | (1) |
| 2019– | Nawair SC | 14 | (0) |

International career^{‡}
| 2010–2016 | Syria | 33 | (1) |
- * Club domestic league appearances and goals ‡ National team caps and goals as of 29 March 2016

Hamdi Al Masri (Arabic: حمدي المصري; born 7 April 1986) is a Syrian footballer who plays as a defender and defensive midfielder for Nawair which competes in the Syrian Premier League and is a member of the Syria national football team.

== Career statistics ==
=== International goals ===
Scores and results list Syria's goal tally first.

| # | Date | Venue | Opponent | Score | Result | Competition |
|---|---|---|---|---|---|---|
| 1. | 26 March 2015 | King Abdullah Stadium, Amman, Jordan | Jordan | 1–0 | 1–0 | Friendly |
