= Al-Najaf SC =

Iraqi football club

Al-Najaf
- Full name: Al-Najaf Al-Ashraf Sports Club
- Nickname: Ghizlan Al-Badiah (Desert Gazelles)
- Founded: 1961; 65 years ago
- Ground: Al-Najaf International Stadium
- Capacity: 30,000
- Chairman: Ali Nayef Al-Ghazali
- Manager: Abdul-Ghani Shahad
- League: Iraqi Premier Division League
- 2025–26: Iraq Stars League, 19th of 20 (relegated)
Home colours	Away colours

Al-Najaf Al-Ashraf Sports Club (Arabic: نادي النجف الأشرف الرياضي), commonly known as Al-Najaf SC, is an Iraqi professional football club based in Najaf. They are members of the Iraqi Premier Division League. Al-Najaf has competed in the 2007 AFC Champions League.

== History ==
In 1960, the city of Najaf began an active movement to establish a sports club after the athletes then felt the need of the city to a sports club that absorbed the energies of young people and their creations which are almost lost in the amateur leagues. Some of the dignitaries of the city were contacted for this purpose. The request was submitted to the Ministry of the Interior, which was responsible for the authorisation of sports clubs in Iraq at that time. The name of Al Ghiri Sports Club was proposed for this institution. In 1961, the Ministry of the Interior approved their request to establish the club and thus wrote the birth certificate of the first sports club in the city of Najaf and consisted of the first administrative body of Messrs. Naji Hassan Hasswa as president and Maki Hadi Maala Vice-President and Alwan Elsafer as secretary. At the beginning of the establishment of the club, the Ministry of the Interior allocated an annual grant of 60 dinars divided into two instalments, and the club relied on this grant and monthly subscriptions from its members.

== Stadiums ==
New Najaf Stadium is a purpose built football stadium that is the current home stadium of Al-Najaf. It opened in 2018, with a capacity of 30,000 people. Until 2018, the club played its home matches at An-Najaf Stadium (Arabic: ستاد النجف).

== Current squad ==
=== First-team squad ===
As of 20 September 2024

Note: Flags indicate national team as defined under FIFA eligibility rules; some limited exceptions apply. Players may hold more than one non-FIFA nationality.

No.	Pos.	Nation	Player
1	GK	IRQ	Ridha Abdulaziz
3	DF	IRQ	Ahmed Maknzi
4	DF	IRQ	Ali Faez
5	DF	TOG	Magnime Agbotcho ^{FGN}
6	MF	ETH	Gathouch Panom
7	MF	IRQ	Mohammed Saleh
8	MF	SEN	Dominique Mendy ^{FGN}
10	MF	IRQ	Mohammed Qasim
11	FW	IRQ	Ridha Mohammed
12	GK	IRQ	Ali Kadhem
13	MF	YEM	Omar Al-Dahi
14	DF	IRQ	Mohammed Jassim (captain)
15	DF	IRQ	Ahmed Naeem

No.	Pos.	Nation	Player
19	FW	IRQ	Younis Humood
21	GK	IRQ	Sarhang Muhsin
32	DF	IRQ	Zainulabdeen Raad
34	DF	IRQ	Mustafa Maan
42	MF	FRA	Sofian El Moudane ^{FGN}
55	MF	IRQ	Murtadha Ali
70	DF	IRQ	Mohammed Hassan
77	FW	IRQ	Zidane Abdul-Jabbar
80	FW	TUN	Bechir Ghariani ^{FGN}
88	FW	NGA	Iyayi Atiemwen ^{FGN}
90	FW	TUN	Nassim Sioud ^{FGN}
99	MF	IRQ	Shubbar Ali

== Current technical staff ==
Position	Name	Nationality
Coach:	Abdul-Ghani Shahad	(Iraq)
Assistant coach:	Dhiyya Falih	(Iraq)
Goalkeeping coach:	Mohammed Abdul-Zahra	(Iraq)
Fitness coach:	Salah Hashim	(Iraq)
Team supervisor:	Fadhel Mohammed	(Iraq)
Team manager:	Mohammed Abdul Hussein	(Iraq)
Team Doctor:	Haitham Abdul Amir	(Iraq)
U-19 Coach:	Haider Lafta	(Iraq)

Updated to match played 25 September 2020
Source: Alsabaah.iq

== Managerial history ==
Since the club's promotion to the Iraqi Premier League in the 1987–88 season so far, twenty-six coaches have led the team:

- (Iraq) Mohammed Hussein Ismail (1974–1976)
- (Iraq) Alwan Mena (1976–1977)
- (Iraq) Nasrat Nasser (1977–1978)
- (Iraq) Mohammed Hussein Ismail (1978–1982)
- (Iraq) Alwan Mena (1982–1985)
- (Iraq) Hatif Shamran (1985–1986)
- (Iraq) Alwan Mena (1986–1988)
- (Iraq) Najeh Humoud (1988–1991)
- (Iraq) Wathiq Naji (1991–1992)
- (Iraq) Hatif Shamran (1992)
- (Iraq) Noman Kadhim & Raheem Jassim (1992–1993)
- (Iraq) Najeh Humoud (1993–1998)
- (Iraq) Hadi Mutanish (1998–1999)
- (Iraq) Ali Kadhim (1999)
- (Iraq) Abdul Ghani Shahad (1999)
- (Iraq) Najeh Humoud (1999–2002)
- (Iraq) Abdul Ghani Shahad (2002–2008)
- (Iraq) Hatif Shamran (2008–2009)
- (Iraq) Majed Najem (2009–2010)
- (Iraq) Abdul Ghani Shahad (2010–2012)
- (Iraq) Hatif Shamran (2012)
- (Iraq) Abdul Ghani Shahad (2012–2013)
- (Iraq) Yahya Alwan (2013)
- (Iraq) Hassan Ahmed (2013)
- (Iraq) Qahtan Chathir (2013–2014)
- (Iraq) Salman Hussein (2014)
- (Iraq) Haider Yahya (2014)
- (Iraq) Hatif Shamran (2014)
- (Iraq) Haider Yahya (2014)
- (Iraq) Hameed Salman (2014–2015)
- (Iraq) Ali Wahab (2015)
- (Iraq) Emad Mohammed (2015–2016)
- (Iraq) Hatif Shamran (2016)
- (Iraq) Emad Mohammed (2016–2017)
- (Iraq) Nadhim Shaker (2017–2018)
- (Iraq) Ali Hashim (2018)
- (Iraq) Ahmed Khalef (2018)
- (Iraq) Mudhafar Jabbar (2018)
- (Iraq) Thair Jassam (2018–2019)
- (Iraq) Chasib Sultan (2019)
- (Iraq) Hassan Ahmad (2019–2021)
- (Iraq) Haidar Aboodi (2021)
- (Iraq) Hatif Shamran (2021)
- (Iraq) Haidar Aboodi (2021–present)

== Honours ==
=== Domestic ===
- Iraq Stars League
  - Runners-up (3): 1995–96, 2005–06, 2008–09
- Baghdad Championship
  - Winners (1): 1997–98

=== Friendly ===
- Victory and Peace Championship
  - Winners (1): 1992
- Love Championship
  - Winners (1): 2003

== Performance in AFC Competitions ==
- AFC Champions League: 1 appearance

2007: Group stage

== Statistics ==
=== In domestic competitions ===
Year	Stars League	Iraq Cup	Super Cup	Baghdad Ch'ship
1987–88	16	Round of 32	not held	Started in 1991
1988–89	7	Round of 32	not held	Started in 1991
1989–90	8	Quarter-final	not held	Started in 1991
1990–91	7	Quarter-final	not held	Started in 1991
1991–92	6	Round of 16	not held	Group stage
1992–93	15	Second round	not held	Group stage
1993–94	4	-	not held	did not qualify
1994–95	3	-	not held	4
1995–96	Runner-up	-	not held	Group stage
1996–97	4	Quarter-final	did not qualify	3
1997–98	4	Round of 16	did not qualify	Winner
1998–99	8	Round of 32	not held	Group stage
1999–2000	9	Round of 16	did not qualify	Group stage
2000–01	6	not held	did not qualify	did not qualify
2001–02	5	Semi-final	did not qualify	Group stage
2002–03	not finished	Quarter-final	did not qualify	Group stage
2003–04	not finished	not held	not held	Group stage
2004–05	6	not held	not held	Abolished in 2004
2005–06	Runner-up	not held	not held	Abolished in 2004
2006–07	3	not held	not held	Abolished in 2004
2007–08	5	not held	not held	Abolished in 2004
2008–09	Runner-up	not held	not held	Abolished in 2004
2009–10	11	not held	not held	Abolished in 2004
2010–11	11	not held	not held	Abolished in 2004
2011–12	9	not held	not held	Abolished in 2004
2012–13	11	not finished	not held	Abolished in 2004
2013–14	15	not held	not held	Abolished in 2004
2014–15	17	not held	not held	Abolished in 2004
2015–16	13	did not enter	not held	Abolished in 2004
2016–17	9	Round of 16	not held	Abolished in 2004
2017–18	6	not held	did not qualify	Abolished in 2004
2018–19	12	Round of 16	not held	Abolished in 2004
2019–20	not finished	not finished	did not qualify	Abolished in 2004
2020–21	3	Round of 16	not held	Abolished in 2004
2021–22	7	Round of 16	did not qualify	Abolished in 2004
2022–23	7	Round of 32	did not qualify	Abolished in 2004
2023–24	4	Round of 16	not held	Abolished in 2004
2024–25	14	Quarter-final	not held	Abolished in 2004
2025–26	19 ↓	not finished	not held	Abolished in 2004

== See also ==
- Iraqi clubs in the AFC Champions League
- 2007–08 Arab Champions League
