= 2012–13 Al-Shorta SC season =

Al Shorta
2012–13 season
- President: (Iraq) Ayad Bunyan
- Manager: (Iraq) Thair Jassam
- Ground: Al Shorta Stadium
- Iraqi Elite League: 1st
- Iraq FA Cup: Not completed
- Baghdad Cup: Winners
- Top goalscorer: League: Amjad Kalaf (9); All: Amjad Kalaf (9)
Home colours	Away colours

In the 2012–13 season, Al Shorta won both the 2012–13 Iraqi Elite League and the Baghdad Cup.

Al Shorta won the Iraqi Elite League on the last day of an historic season, thrashing Al Talaba 3–0 to ensure that they clinched the title for the first time since the 1997–98 season and finished two points ahead of second-placed Arbil, losing just two games in the entire season. Al Shorta also triumphed in the Baghdad Cup, with a 1–0 win over rivals Al Zawraa. Hussein Karim scored the winning goal in the match.

The season witnessed Al Shorta sign their first ever foreign players. Cameroonian defender Innocent Awoa was the first to join, and he became a key player for Al Shorta, scoring a goal on the opening day of the season. Sékou Tidiane Souaré, an Ivorian defender, joined the club soon after Innocent Awoa's arrival, however he left the club without playing a single game due to homesickness. Cameroon international striker Jean Michel N'Lend signed a contract with the club at the start of the season and he bagged six goals during his spell at the club, including an historic hat-trick against rivals Al Quwa Al Jawiya. He became the first ever non-Iraqi to score a hat-trick in an Iraqi Premier League match and he left the club in May 2013. Nigerian striker Minusu Buba joined the club on loan a few games into the season and became a star striker, scoring eight goals including a goal in the final match of the season (the 3–0 victory over Al Talaba). Defender Paul Koulibaly, a Burkina Faso regular, joined in the winter transfer window and he provided solidity and experience to the league's second-best defence (only Baghdad FC conceded fewer goals than Al Shorta in the season).

Many of these signings were orchestrated by Al Shorta's Iraqi manager Thair Jassam, who joined the club at the very beginning of the season. He led the team to a league and cup double, cementing his place as a legend for the club.

Al Shorta's league top scorer was Iraqi forward Amjad Kalaf for the third season in a row; this time he netted nine goals.

== Squad ==
Note: Flags indicate national team as defined under FIFA eligibility rules; some limited exceptions apply. Players may hold more than one non-FIFA nationality.

No.	Pos.	Nation	Player
1	GK	IRQ	Ali Husain (vice-captain)
2	DF	IRQ	Ali Abd Ali
3	DF	IRQ	Dhirgham Ismail
4	DF	IRQ	Zeid Khalaf
5	MF	IRQ	Hussein Abdul-Wahed
6	DF	IRQ	Kassim Zidan
7	FW	IRQ	Sherko Karim
8	MF	IRQ	Mohammed Faisel
10	FW	IRQ	Muslim Mubarak
11	FW	IRQ	Hussein Karim
12	GK	IRQ	Mohammed Gassid
13	FW	NGR	Minusu Buba (on loan from El Gouna FC)
14	FW	IRQ	Amjad Kalaf

No.	Pos.	Nation	Player
15	MF	IRQ	Nashat Akram (captain)
17	FW	IRQ	Muhaimen Salim
19	MF	IRQ	Ahmad Ayad
20	DF	IRQ	Fareed Majeed
22	DF	CMR	Innocent Awoa
23	GK	IRQ	Mohammed Hameed
24	MF	IRQ	Mahdi Kamel
25	DF	IRQ	Waleed Salem
30	MF	IRQ	Ali Rahim
32	DF	IRQ	Ali Mohammed Alialah
33	DF	BFA	Paul Koulibaly
35	MF	IRQ	Ahmad Fadhel

=== Out on loan ===
Note: Flags indicate national team as defined under FIFA eligibility rules; some limited exceptions apply. Players may hold more than one non-FIFA nationality.

No.	Pos.	Nation	Player
18	MF	IRQ	Husain Abdullah (at Al Talaba until the end of the 2012–13 season)
—	MF	IRQ	Haider Salim (at Zakho FC until the end of the 2012–13 season)
—	MF	IRQ	Ali Hussein Fandi (at Sulaymaniya FC until the end of the 2012–13 season)

=== Departed during season ===
Note: Flags indicate national team as defined under FIFA eligibility rules; some limited exceptions apply. Players may hold more than one non-FIFA nationality.

No.	Pos.	Nation	Player
6	DF	CIV	Sékou Tidiane Souaré
15	MF	IRQ	Abbas Rehema
21	FW	CMR	Jean Michel N'Lend

== Kit ==
Period	Home colours	Away colours
October 2012 – April 2013, June 2013 – July 2013	Lotto	Lotto
April 2013 – May 2013, July 2013 – September 2013	Nike	Lotto

== Transfers ==
=== In ===
Date	Pos.	Name	From	Fee
August 2012	FW	(Iraq) Hussein Karim	(Iraq) Dohuk FC	–
August 2012	MF	(Iraq) Abbas Rehema	(Iraq) Al Talaba	–
August 2012	GK	(Iraq) Mohammed Gassid	(Iraq) Al Talaba	–
August 2012	FW	(Iraq) Muslim Mubarak	(Iraq) Arbil FC	–
August 2012	MF	(Iraq) Hussein Abdul-Wahed	(Iraq) Arbil FC	–
August 2012	MF	(Iraq) Ahmad Ayad	(Iraq) Arbil FC	–
September 2012	DF	(Cameroon) Innocent Awoa	(Egypt) El Gouna FC	–
September 2012	MF	(Iraq) Mohammed Faisel	(Iraq) Al Talaba	–
September 2012	DF	(Ivory Coast) Sékou Tidiane Souaré	Free agent	–
September 2012	FW	(Cameroon) Jean Michel N'Lend	Free agent	–
November 2012	DF	(Iraq) Waleed Salem	(Iraq) Arbil FC	–
December 2012	FW	(Nigeria) Minusu Buba	(Egypt) El Gouna FC	Loan
February 2013	MF	(Iraq) Nashat Akram	(United Arab Emirates) Al Nasr SC	–
February 2013	DF	(Iraq) Kassim Zidan	(Iraq) Karbala FC	–
March 2013	DF	(Burkina Faso) Paul Koulibaly	(Romania) FC Dinamo București	–

=== Out ===
Date	Pos.	Name	To	Fee
August 2012	FW	(Iraq) Ali Oudah	(Iraq) Al Najaf	–
August 2012	MF	(Iraq) Jabir Shakir	(Iraq) Al Najaf	–
August 2012	MF	(Iraq) Sanad Raad Saleem		–
August 2012	MF	(Iraq) Muntadher Abdulkareem		–
August 2012	MF	(Iraq) Muhammed Eskander		–
August 2012	FW	(Iraq) Emad Mohsin		–
August 2012	DF	(Iraq) Abbas Rahif	(Iraq) Al Kahraba	–
August 2012	MF	(Iraq) Kadhum Dheiaa	(Iraq) Al-Hedood	–
August 2012	MF	(Iraq) Ali Yousif	(Iraq) Karbala FC	–
August 2012	FW	(Iraq) Hussam Ibrahim	(Iraq) Baghdad FC	–
September 2012	DF	(Iraq) Safwan Abdul-Ghani	(Iraq) Zakho FC	–
September 2012	MF	(Iraq) Emad Ghali	(Iraq) Al Talaba	–
September 2012	MF	(Iraq) Ali Khudhair	(Iraq) Al Talaba	–
September 2012	MF	(Iraq) Nadim Karim	(Iraq) Al Quwa Al Jawiya	–
September 2012	FW	(Iraq) Mousa Hashem	(Iraq) Baghdad FC	–
September 2012	MF	(Iraq) Emad Khalaf	(Iraq) Al Quwa Al Jawiya	–
September 2012	DF	(Iraq) Waleed Bahar	(Iraq) Al Quwa Al Jawiya	–
October 2012	DF	(Ivory Coast) Sékou Tidiane Souaré		–
December 2012	DF	(Iraq) Mustafa Maan		–
December 2012	MF	(Iraq) Ali Essam		–
February 2013	GK	(Iraq) Muhanned Jabbar	(Iraq) Al Naft	–
February 2013	MF	(Iraq) Haider Salim	(Iraq) Zakho FC	Loan
February 2013	MF	(Iraq) Abbas Rehema	(Iraq) Al Talaba	–
February 2013	MF	(Iraq) Ali Hussein Fandi	(Iraq) Sulaymaniya FC	Loan
February 2013	MF	(Iraq) Husain Abdullah	(Iraq) Al Talaba	Loan
May 2013	FW	(Cameroon) Jean Michel N'Lend		–

== Iraqi Elite League ==
=== Matches ===
20 October 2012 1	Al Sinaa	0–1	Al Shorta	Baghdad
12:00 GMT			Innocent Awoa 90+1'	Stadium: Al Sina'a Stadium

26 October 2012 2	Al Shorta	2–0	Najaf FC	Baghdad
12:00 GMT	Muslim Mubarak 43'; Amjad Kalaf 86' (pen.)			Stadium: Al Shorta Stadium

2 November 2012 3	Zakho FC	0–0	Al Shorta	Zakho
11:30 GMT				Stadium: Simele Stadium

18 November 2012 4	Al Shorta	4–1	Al Quwa Al Jawiya	Baghdad
14:00 GMT	Jean Michel N'Lend 22', 41', 77'; Muslim Mubarak 48'; Ali Husain (yellow card) 24' (yellow-red card) 83'		Hammadi Ahmad 26'; Mohammed Abdul-Zahra (red card) 75'	Stadium: Al Shaab Stadium

22 November 2012 5	Al Masafi	2–3	Al Shorta	Baghdad
11:30 GMT	Wissam Abdul-Sajjad 57'; Mustafa Kareem 75'		Mohammed Faisel 33'; Amjad Kalaf 56'; Muslim Mubarak 68'	Stadium: Al Naft Stadium

29 November 2012 6	Al Shorta	0–0	Al Kahraba	Baghdad
11:30 GMT				Stadium: Al Shorta Stadium

16 December 2012 7	Al Shorta	2–2	Al Naft	Baghdad
11:30 GMT	Jean Michel N'Lend 13'; Hussein Abdul-Wahed 81'		Mohammed Saad 49', 67'	Stadium: Al Shaab Stadium

22 December 2012 8	Sulaymaniya FC	1–1	Al Shorta	Sulaymaniyah
11:30 GMT	Mahmoud Amnah 8'		Dhirgham Ismail 57'; Jean Michel N'Lend (red card) 90'	Stadium: Sulaymaniyah Stadium

22 January 2013 9	Al Shorta	4–1	Al Minaa	Baghdad
11:30 GMT	Dhirgham Ismail 11'; Hussein Karim 20'; Ahmad Ayad 33'; Ali Rahim 72'		Nassir Tallaa 74' (pen.)	Stadium: Al Shorta Stadium

27 January 2013 10	Al Shorta	2–1	Naft Al Junoob	Baghdad
11:30 GMT	Hussein Karim 20'; Jean Michel N'Lend 38'		Basem Ali 30'	Stadium: Al Shorta Stadium

2 February 2013 11	Karbala FC	0–1	Al Shorta	Karbalaa
11:30 GMT			Hussein Karim 11'	Stadium: Karbala Stadium

7 February 2013 12	Al Shorta	1–0	Kirkuk FC	Baghdad
11:30 GMT	Hussein Karim 37'			Stadium: Al Shorta Stadium

13 February 2013 13	Duhok FC	1–1	Al Shorta	Dohuk
11:30 GMT	Salih Sadir 20'		Ahmad Fadhel 13'	Stadium: Duhok Stadium

19 February 2013 14	Al Shorta	1–1	Baghdad FC	Baghdad
11:00 GMT	Minusu Buba 32'		Hussam Ibrahim 62'	Stadium: Al Shorta Stadium

24 February 2013 15	Al Zawraa	1–2	Al Shorta	Baghdad
14:00 GMT	Ali Qasem 9'		Waleed Salem 45'; Jean Michel N'Lend 45+2'	Stadium: Al Shaab Stadium

1 March 2013 16	Al Shorta	1–1	Al Talaba	Baghdad
14:00 GMT	Amjad Kalaf 31'		Ahmed Said 64'	Stadium: Al Shaab Stadium

6 April 2013 17	Al Shorta	3–0	Al Sinaa	Baghdad
13:00 GMT	Nashat Akram 57'; Amjad Kalaf 59'; Minusu Buba 84'			Stadium: Al Shorta Stadium

14 April 2013 18	Najaf FC	1–1	Al Shorta	Najaf
12:30 GMT	Ali Oudah 44'		Nashat Akram 52' (pen.)	Stadium: An Najaf Stadium

19 April 2013 19	Arbil FC	0–1	Al Shorta	Arbil
14:00 GMT	Halgurd Mulla Mohammed (yellow card) 43'		Jean Michel N'Lend (yellow card) 31'; Nashat Akram (yellow card) 63', (goal) 66'; Hussein Abdul-Wahed (yellow card) 73'	Stadium: Franso Hariri Stadium; Referee: Sabah Abid
Note: This match was rescheduled from 7 December 2012.

27 April 2013 20	Al Shorta	2–0	Zakho FC	Baghdad
13:00 GMT	Nashat Akram 65' (pen.); Dhirgham Ismail 90+4'; Waleed Salem (red card)			Stadium: Al Shorta Stadium

4 May 2013 21	Al Quwa Al Jawiya	4–0	Al Shorta	Baghdad
14:00 GMT	Mustafa Karim 31', 39'; Hammadi Ahmad 59'; Humam Tariq (yellow card) 66'; Ayad Sadir 77'		Ahmad Fadhel (yellow card) 28'; Muslim Mubarak (yellow card) 75'; Hussein Karim (yellow card) 83'	Stadium: Al Shaab Stadium

9 May 2013 22	Al Shorta	5–0	Al Masafi	Baghdad
13:00 GMT	Amjad Kalaf 20', 39'; Hussein Karim 52'; Minusu Buba 73'; Dhirgham Ismail 87'		Salah Hilal (red card) 30'	Stadium: Al Shorta Stadium

14 May 2013 23	Al Kahraba	1–1	Al Shorta	Baghdad
13:30 GMT	Mustafa Jawda 28' (pen.)		Amjad Kalaf 76'	Stadium: Al Karkh Stadium

27 June 2013 24	Al Naft	1–2	Al Shorta	Baghdad
16:00 GMT	Mutaz Kailouni 22' (pen.)		Amjad Kalaf 41' (pen.); Muslim Mubarak 74'	Stadium: Al Shaab Stadium

3 July 2013 25	Al Shorta	4–0	Sulaymaniya FC	Baghdad
14:00 GMT	Minusu Buba 9', 60'; Muslim Mubarak 64'; Muhaimen Salim 79'			Stadium: Al Shorta Stadium

10 July 2013 26	Al Minaa	2–1	Al Shorta	Basra
14:00 GMT	Hamid Mido 45'; Nassir Tallaa 77' (pen.)		Muhaimen Salim 90+2'	Stadium: Al Jumhouriya Stadium

15 July 2013 27	Naft Al Junoob	0–2	Al Shorta	Basra
14:00 GMT			Muslim Mubarak 1'; Mohammed Faisel 59'	Stadium: Naft Al Junoob Stadium

24 July 2013 28	Al Shorta	3–2	Karbala FC	Baghdad
14:00 GMT	Minusu Buba 72'; Nashat Akram 76'; Hussein Karim 85'		Karim Walem 28'; Maitham Hamza 31'	Stadium: Al Shorta Stadium

29 July 2013 29	Kirkuk FC	0–1	Al Shorta	Kirkuk
14:00 GMT			Fareed Majeed 45+2'	Stadium: Kirkuk Stadium

7 August 2013 30	Al Shorta	4–3	Duhok FC	Baghdad
14:00 GMT	Minusu Buba 18'; Amjad Kalaf 35'; Mahdi Kamel 71'; Mohammed Faisel 88' (pen.)		Mohannad Abdul-Raheem 45+2', 64'; Alaa Abdul-Zahra 77'	Stadium: Al Shorta Stadium

18 August 2013 31	Baghdad FC	1–1	Al Shorta	Baghdad
13:30 GMT	Hussam Ibrahim 33'		Muslim Mubarak 45+3'	Stadium: Baghdad Stadium

22 August 2013 32	Al Shorta	1–1	Arbil FC	Baghdad
14:00 GMT	Innocent Awoa (red card) 52'; Mahdi Kamel 61'		Hawar Mulla Mohammed (red card) 52'; Luay Salah 90+1'	Stadium: Al Shaab Stadium

31 August 2013 33	Al Shorta	1–1	Al Zawraa	Baghdad
13:40 GMT	Nashat Akram 9'		Haidar Sabah 84'	Stadium: Al Shaab Stadium

4 September 2013 34	Al Talaba	0–3	Al Shorta	Baghdad
13:15 GMT			Hussein Karim 27'; Minusu Buba 69'; Dhirgham Ismail 80'	Stadium: Al Shaab Stadium

==== Score overview ====
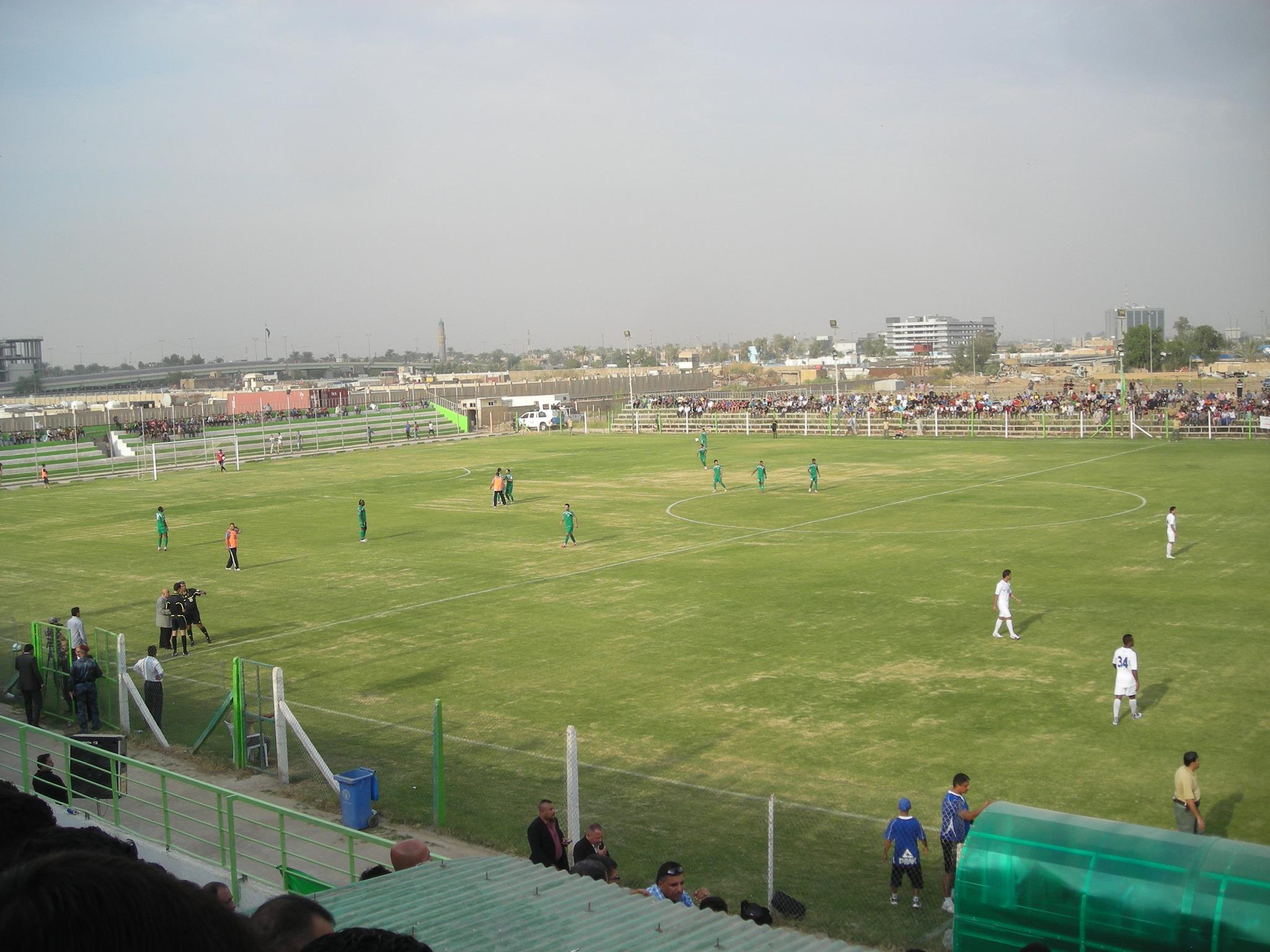
Players take to the Al Shorta Stadium field to play Najaf FC on 26 October 2012.

Win Draw Loss

Opposition	Home score	Away score	Double
Arbil FC	1–1	1–0	No
Baghdad FC	1–1	1–1	No
Duhok FC	4–3	1–1	No
Al Kahraba	0–0	1–1	No
Karbala FC	3–2	1–0	Yes
Kirkuk FC	1–0	1–0	Yes
Al Masafi	5–0	3–2	Yes
Al Minaa	4–1	1–2	No
Al Naft	2–2	2–1	No
Naft Al Junoob	2–1	2–0	Yes
Najaf FC	2–0	1–1	No
Al Quwa Al Jawiya	4–1	0–4	No
Al Sinaa	3–0	1–0	Yes
Sulaymaniya FC	4–0	1–1	No
Al Talaba	1–1	3–0	No
Zakho FC	2–0	0–0	No
Al Zawraa	1–1	2–1	No

Note: Al Shorta goals listed first.

==== Classification ====
Pos	Team	Pld	W	D	L	GF	GA	GD	Pts	Qualification or relegation
1	Al-Shorta (C)	34	20	12	2	62	29	+33	72	Qualification for the AFC Champions League preliminary round 1
2	Erbil	34	21	7	6	68	34	+34	70	Qualification for the AFC Cup group stage
3	Al-Quwa Al-Jawiya	34	21	6	7	60	33	+27	69	
4	Al-Zawraa	34	18	11	5	61	29	+32	65	
5	Duhok	34	16	10	8	54	35	+19	58	

Source: Soccerway
Rules for classification: 1) points; 2) goal difference; 3) number of goals scored.
(C) Champions

==== Results summary ====
Overall								Home						Away					
Pld	W	D	L	GF	GA	GD	Pts	W	D	L	GF	GA	GD	W	D	L	GF	GA	GD
34	20	12	2	62	29	+33	72	11	6	0	40	14	+26	9	6	2	22	15	+7

Source: Soccerway

==== Results by round ====
Round	1	2	3	4	5	6	7	8	9	10	11	12	13	14	15	16	17	18	19	20	21	22	23	24	25	26	27	28	29	30	31	32	33	34
Ground	A	H	A	H	A	H	H	A	H	H	A	H	A	H	A	H	H	A	A	H	A	H	A	A	H	A	A	H	A	H	A	H	H	A
Result	W	W	D	W	W	D	D	D	W	W	W	W	D	D	W	D	W	D	W	W	L	W	D	W	W	L	W	W	W	W	D	D	D	W
Position	5	3	2	2	2	2	2	2	2	2	1	1	1	1	1	1	1	1	1	1	1	1	1	1	1	2	1	1	1	1	1	1	1	1

Source: Soccerway
A = Away; H = Home; W = Win; D = Draw; L = Loss

== Baghdad Cup ==
16 June 2013 Final	Al Shorta	1–0	Al Zawraa	Baghdad
15:45 GMT	Hussein Karim 57'			Stadium: Al Shaab Stadium

== Top goalscorers ==
=== Iraqi Elite League ===
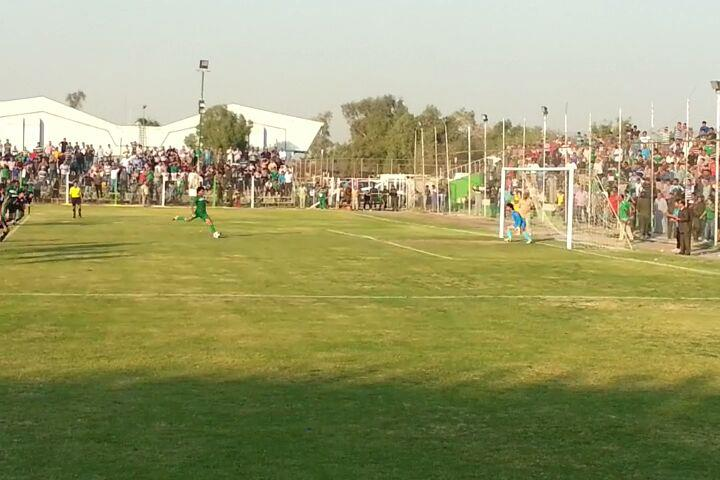
Nashat Akram taking a penalty against Zakho on 27 April 2013.

Position	Nation	Squad Number	Name	Goals	Assists
FW	(Iraq)	14	Amjad Kalaf	9	10
FW	(Nigeria)	13	Minusu Buba	8	2
FW	(Iraq)	10	Muslim Mubarak	7	3
FW	(Iraq)	11	Hussein Karim	7	1
MF	(Iraq)	15	Nashat Akram	6	2
FW	(Cameroon)	21	Jean Michel N'Lend	6	1
DF	(Iraq)	3	Dhirgham Ismail	5	4
MF	(Iraq)	8	Mohammed Faisel	3	4
MF	(Iraq)	24	Mahdi Kamel	2	2
FW	(Iraq)	17	Muhaimen Salim	2	0
MF	(Iraq)	35	Ahmad Fadhel	1	6
MF	(Iraq)	5	Hussein Abdul-Wahed	1	3
MF	(Iraq)	19	Ahmad Ayad	1	3
DF	(Iraq)	25	Waleed Salem	1	2
DF	(Cameroon)	22	Innocent Awoa	1	1
DF	(Iraq)	20	Fareed Majeed	1	0
MF	(Iraq)	30	Ali Rahim	1	0

=== Baghdad Cup ===
Position	Nation	Squad Number	Name	Goals	Assists
FW	(Iraq)	11	Hussein Karim	1	0
