= Football at the 2011 Arab Games – Men's team squads =

Below are the squads for the Football at the 2011 Arab Games, hosted by Qatar, and took place between 10 and 23 December 2011.

== Group A ==
=== Bahrain ===
Coach: (England) Peter Taylor

| No. | Pos. | Player | Date of birth (age) | Caps | Goals | Club |
|---|---|---|---|---|---|---|
| 1 | GK | Sayed Mohammed Jaffer | 25 August 1985 (aged 26) | 149 | 0 | Al-Riffa SC |
| 4 | DF | Sayed Dhiya Saeed | 17 July 1992 (aged 19) | 6 | 0 | |

=== Iraq ===
Coach: (Brazil) Zico

| No. | Pos. | Player | Date of birth (age) | Caps | Goals | Club |
|---|---|---|---|---|---|---|
| 1 | GK | Jalal Hassan | 18 May 1991 (aged 20) | 1 | 0 | (Iraq Football Association) Karbala |
| 2 | DF | Mohammed Ali Karim | 25 June 1986 (aged 25) | 25 | 0 | (Iraq Football Association) Al-Zawraa |
| 3 | DF | Ahmed Ibrahim | 25 February 1992 (aged 19) | 7 | 0 | (Iraq Football Association) Erbil |
| 4 | MF | Qusay Munir | 12 April 1981 (aged 30) | 77 | 6 | (Iraq Football Association) Erbil |
| 5 | MF | Ibrahim Kamil | 9 September 1988 (aged 23) | 0 | 0 | (Iraq Football Association) Al-Quwa Al-Jawiya |
| 6 | MF | Salih Sadir | 21 August 1981 (aged 30) | 59 | 11 | (Iraq Football Association) Al-Najaf |
| 7 | FW | Luay Salah | 7 February 1982 (aged 29) | 18 | 4 | (Iraq Football Association) Erbil |
| 8 | MF | Samer Saeed | 1 December 1987 (aged 24) | 25 | 0 | (Iraq Football Association) Najaf |
| 9 | FW | Nabeel Sabah | 1 July 1990 (aged 21) | 0 | 0 | (Iraq Football Association) Erbil |
| 10 | FW | Amjad Radhi | 17 July 1990 (aged 21) | 7 | 0 | (Iraq Football Association) Erbil |
| 11 | MF | Amir Sabah | 10 January 1988 (aged 23) | 2 | 0 | (Iraq Football Association) Zakho |
| 12 | GK | Mohammed Gassid | 10 December 1986 (aged 25) | 49 | 0 | (Iraq Football Association) Al-Talaba |
| 13 | MF | Karrar Jassim | 11 June 1987 (aged 24) | 44 | 3 | (Football Federation Islamic Republic of Iran) Esteghlal |
| 14 | DF | Salam Shaker | 31 July 1986 (aged 25) | 43 | 2 | (Qatar Football Association) Al-Khor |
| 15 | DF | Ali Rehema | 8 August 1985 (aged 26) | 76 | 1 | (Qatar Football Association) Al-Wakrah |
| 16 | DF | Dhurgham Ismail | 23 May 1994 (aged 17) | 0 | 0 | (Iraq Football Association) Al-Shorta |
| 17 | FW | Alaa Abdul-Zahra | 22 December 1987 (aged 23) | 38 | 10 | (Qatar Football Association) Al-Wakrah |
| 18 | MF | Mahdi Karim | 10 December 1983 (aged 28) | 91 | 12 | (Iraq Football Association) Erbil |
| 19 | DF | Hussam Kadhim | 17 October 1987 (aged 24) | 3 | 0 | (Iraq Football Association) Naft Al-Janoob |
| 20 | MF | Muthana Khalid | 14 June 1989 (aged 22) | 18 | 0 | (Iraq Football Association) Al-Quwa Al-Jawiya |
| 21 | MF | Fareed Majeed | 10 April 1986 (aged 25) | 11 | 0 | (Iraq Football Association) Al-Shorta |
| 22 | GK | Noor Sabri | 18 June 1984 (aged 27) | 63 | 0 | (Iraq Football Association) Najaf |
| 23 | FW | Mustafa Ahmad | 1 January 1991 (aged 20) | 1 | 0 | (Iraq Football Association) Erbil |

== Group B ==
=== Kuwait ===
Coach: (Serbia) Goran Tufegdžić

=== Saudi Arabia ===
Coach: (Brazil) Rogério Lourenço

| No. | Pos. | Player | Date of birth (age) | Club |
|---|---|---|---|---|
| 1 | GK | Hussain Shae'an | 23 May 1989 (aged 22) | (Saudi Arabian Football Federation) Al-Shabab |
| 2 | DF | Saleh Al-Qumaizi | 30 October 1991 (aged 20) | (Saudi Arabian Football Federation) Al-Shabab |
| 4 | MF | Sultan Al-Dossari | 1 January 1990 (aged 21) | (Saudi Arabian Football Federation) Al-Ahli |
| 5 | DF | Hadi Yahya | 3 April 1990 (aged 21) | (Saudi Arabian Football Federation) Al-Shabab |
| 6 | MF | Ibrahim Al-Ibrahim | 3 June 1992 (aged 19) | (Saudi Arabian Football Federation) Al-Ettifaq |
| 7 | MF | Salman Al-Faraj | 1 August 1989 (aged 22) | (Saudi Arabian Football Federation) Al-Hilal |
| 8 | MF | Hattan Maatouq Amin | | (Saudi Arabian Football Federation) Al-Ahli |
| 9 | FW | Mohammed Majrashi | 20 May 1991 (aged 20) | (Saudi Arabian Football Federation) Al-Ahli |
| 10 | MF | Tamim Al-Dawsari | 4 June 1989 (aged 22) | (Saudi Arabian Football Federation) Al-Shabab |
| 11 | FW | Yahya Dagriri | 13 August 1991 (aged 19) | (Saudi Arabian Football Federation) Al-Ittihad |
| 12 | MF | Maan Khodari | 13 December 1991 (aged 19) | (Saudi Arabian Football Federation) Al-Ittihad |
| 13 | DF | Ahmed Assiri | 14 November 1991 (aged 20) | (Saudi Arabian Football Federation) Al-Ittihad |
| 14 | DF | Mubarak Wajdi | 22 August 1991 (aged 20) | (Saudi Arabian Football Federation) Al-Ettifaq |
| 15 | MF | Salem Al-Dawsari | 19 August 1991 (aged 20) | (Saudi Arabian Football Federation) Al-Hilal |
| 16 | FW | Zamil Al-Sulim | 29 October 1989 (aged 22) | (Saudi Arabian Football Federation) Al-Najma |
| 17 | MF | Mohammed Al-Safri | 25 June 1990 (aged 21) | (Saudi Arabian Football Federation) Al-Ahli |
| 18 | DF | Redwan Al-Mousa | 13 September 1990 (aged 21) | (Saudi Arabian Football Federation) Al-Hilal |
| 19 | DF | Mohammed Al-Amri | 26 November 1991 (aged 20) | (Saudi Arabian Football Federation) Al-Ittihad |
| 20 | FW | Salman Al-Sibyani | 11 November 1989 (aged 22) | (Saudi Arabian Football Federation) Al-Wehda |
| 21 | GK | Ahmed Al-Fahmi | 12 December 1990 (aged 20) | (Saudi Arabian Football Federation) Al-Wehda |
| 22 | GK | Abdullah Al-Shammeri | 24 November 1991 (aged 20) | (Saudi Arabian Football Federation) Al-Nassr |
| 23 | MF | Ahmed Al-Zaaq | 28 April 1989 (aged 22) | (Saudi Arabian Football Federation) Al-Raed |
| 24 | MF | Hattan Bahebri | 16 July 1992 (aged 19) | (Saudi Arabian Football Federation) Al-Ittihad |

== Group C ==
=== Jordan ===
Coach: (Iraq) Adnan Hamad

| No. | Pos. | Player | Date of birth (age) | Caps | Goals | Club |
|---|---|---|---|---|---|---|
| 1 | GK | Lo'ai Al-Amaireh | October 2, 1978 (aged 33) | | | (Jordan Football Association) Al-Faisaly |
| 12 | GK | Abdullah Al-Zubi | October 8, 1989 (aged 22) | | | (Jordan Football Association) Al-Ramtha |
| 22 | GK | Ahmed Abdel-Sattar | July 6, 1984 (aged 27) | | | (Jordan Football Association) Shabab Al-Ordon |
| 3 | DF | Suleiman Al-Salman | June 16, 1987 (aged 24) | | | (Jordan Football Association) Al-Ramtha |
| 5 | DF | Mohammad Al-Dmeiri | August 30, 1987 (aged 24) | | | (Jordan Football Association) Al-Wahdat |
| 13 | DF | Khalil Bani Attiah | June 8, 1991 (aged 20) | | | (Jordan Football Association) Al-Faisaly |
| 17 | DF | Ibrahim Al-Zawahreh | January 17, 1989 (aged 22) | | | (Jordan Football Association) Al-Faisaly |
| 21 | DF | Salem Al-Ajalin | February 18, 1988 (aged 23) | | | (Jordan Football Association) Al-Jazeera |
| 19 | DF | Anas Bani Yaseen | November 29, 1988 (aged 23) | | | (Kuwait Football Association) Al-Qadsia |
| 8 | DF | Mohammad Mustafa | October 29, 1989 (aged 22) | | | (Jordan Football Association) Al-Jazeera |
| 2 | DF | Shareef Adnan | January 21, 1984 (aged 27) | | | (Jordan Football Association) Al-Faisaly |
| 4 | MF | Baha' Abdul-Rahman | January 5, 1987 (aged 24) | | | (Jordan Football Association) Al-Faisaly |
| 6 | MF | Saeed Murjan | February 10, 1990 (aged 21) | | | (Jordan Football Association) Al-Arabi |
| 16 | MF | Alaa' Al-Shaqran | April 21, 1987 (aged 24) | | | (Jordan Football Association) Shabab Al-Ordon |
| 23 | MF | Munther Abu Amarah | April 24, 1992 (aged 19) | | | (Jordan Football Association) Al-Wahdat |
| 18 | MF | Rami Samara | March 26, 1983 (aged 28) | | | (Jordan Football Association) Al-Ramtha |
| 15 | MF | Mohammad Al-Dawud | April 12, 1992 (aged 19) | | | (Jordan Football Association) Al-Ramtha |
| 14 | FW | Abdallah Deeb | March 10, 1987 (aged 24) | | | (Jordan Football Association) Al-Wahdat |
| 20 | FW | Hamza Al-Dardour | May 12, 1991 (aged 20) | | | (Jordan Football Association) Al-Ramtha |
| 10 | FW | Mohannad Maharmeh | December 30, 1986 (aged 24) | | | (Jordan Football Association) Al-Faisaly |
| 9 | FW | Rakan Al-Khalidi | October 21, 1988 (aged 23) | | | (Jordan Football Association) Al-Ramtha |
| 7 | FW | Mussab Al-Laham | May 20, 1991 (aged 20) | | | (Jordan Football Association) Al-Ramtha |
| 11 | FW | Ra'ed Al-Nawateer | May 5, 1988 (aged 23) | | | (Jordan Football Association) Al-Faisaly |
