= 2009 in Iraqi football =

== National team ==
=== Friendly Matches ===
22 March 2009

| Saudi Arabia | 0 – 0 | Iraq |

King Fahd International Stadium, Riyadh, Saudi Arabia
28 March 2009

| South Korea | 2 – 1 | Iraq |
|---|---|---|
| Kim Chi-Woo 54'; Lee Keun-Ho 70' (pen.) | | Hwang Jae-Won 49' (o.g.) |

Suwon World Cup Stadium, Suwon, South Korea
May 2009

| Qatar | 1 – 0* | Iraq |
|---|---|---|
| Ibrahim Majid 33' |

Al-Sadd Stadium, Doha, Qatar
9 June 2009

| Poland | 1 – 1 | Iraq |
|---|---|---|
| Roger Guerreiro 71' | | Mahdi Karim 53' |

Green Point Stadium, Cape Town, South Africa
10 July 2009

| Iraq | 3 – 0 | Palestine |
|---|---|---|
| Hawar Mulla Mohammed 20'; Younis Mahmoud 54'; Luay Salah 90+3' |

Franso Hariri Stadium, Arbil, Iraq
13 July 2009

| Iraq | 4 – 0 | Palestine |
|---|---|---|
| Hawar Mulla Mohammed 28'; Karrar Jassim 58'; Alaa Abdul-Zahra 73'; Emad Mohammed 90+3' (pen.) |

Al-Shaab Stadium, Baghdad, Iraq
- Qatar vs. Iraq not considered as a FIFA International match since Iraq made 13 Substitutions.

=== Four Nations Tournament ===
Four nations tournament, hosted in the UAE. Two semi-finals, winners advance to the final.

15 November 2009

| Iraq | 1 – 0 | Azerbaijan |
|---|---|---|
| Abbas 88' |

Tahnoun bin Mohammed Stadium, Al Ain, UAE

18 November 2009

| Iraq | 1 – 0 | United Arab Emirates |
|---|---|---|
| ? (?) |

Tahnoun bin Mohammed Stadium, Al Ain, UAE

=== 2009 FIFA Confederations Cup ===
==== Group A ====
Group A of the 2009 FIFA Confederations Cup took place from 14 to 20 June 2009 in Bloemfontein's Free State Stadium, Johannesburg's Ellis Park Stadium, and Rustenburg's Royal Bafokeng Stadium. The group consisted of Iraq, New Zealand, host nation South Africa, and Spain.

== Standings ==
| Pos | Team | Pld | W | D | L | GF | GA | GD | Pts | Qualification |
|---|---|---|---|---|---|---|---|---|---|---|
| 1 | Spain | 3 | 3 | 0 | 0 | 8 | 0 | +8 | 9 | Advance to knockout stage |
| 2 | South Africa (H) | 3 | 1 | 1 | 1 | 2 | 2 | 0 | 4 | Advance to knockout stage |
| 3 | Iraq | 3 | 0 | 2 | 1 | 0 | 1 | −1 | 2 | |
| 4 | New Zealand | 3 | 0 | 1 | 2 | 0 | 7 | −7 | 1 | |

Source: FIFA
(H) Hosts

== Matches ==
=== South Africa vs Iraq ===
14 June 2009
16:00 SAST

| South Africa | 0–0 | Iraq |
|---|---|---|
| | Report |

Ellis Park Stadium, Johannesburg
Attendance: 48,837
Referee: Jorge Larrionda (Uruguay)

| South Africa | Iraq |

| GK | 16 | Itumeleng Khune |
| RB | 2 | Siboniso Gaxa |
| CB | 14 | Matthew Booth |
| CB | 4 | Aaron Mokoena (c) |
| LB | 3 | Tsepo Masilela |
| RM | 6 | MacBeth Sibaya | (yellow card) 81' |
| CM | 5 | Benson Mhlongo |
| CM | 13 | Kagisho Dikgacoi |
| LM | 12 | Teko Modise |
| CF | 18 | Thembinkosi Fanteni | (yellow card) 2' | (substituted off) 78' |
| CF | 17 | Bernard Parker | | (substituted off) 85' |
Substitutions:
| FW | 21 | Katlego Mashego | | (substituted on) 78' |
| MF | 10 | Steven Pienaar | | (substituted on) 85' |
Manager:
(Brazil) Joel Santana

| GK | 12 | Mohammed Gassid |
| RB | 14 | Salam Shaker |
| CB | 2 | Mohammed Ali Karim |
| CB | 4 | Fareed Majeed |
| CB | 15 | Ali Rehema |
| LB | 3 | Bassim Abbas |
| RM | 18 | Mahdi Karim | | (substituted off) 88' |
| CM | 5 | Nashat Akram | (yellow card) 74' |
| LM | 13 | Karrar Jassim | | (substituted off) 74' |
| CF | 10 | Younis Mahmoud (c) |
| CF | 7 | Emad Mohammed | | (substituted off) 76' |
Substitutions:
| MF | 11 | Hawar Mulla Mohammed | | (substituted on) 74' |
| FW | 17 | Alaa Abdul-Zahra | | (substituted on) 76' |
| MF | 6 | Salih Sadir | | (substituted on) 88' |
Manager:
(Serbia) Bora Milutinović

Man of the Match:
Teko Modise (South Africa)

Assistant referees:
Pablo Fandiño (Uruguay)
Mauricio Espinosa (Uruguay)
Fourth official:
Martin Hansson (Sweden)
Fifth official:
Henrik Andrén (Sweden)

=== New Zealand vs Spain ===
14 June 2009
20:30 SAST

| New Zealand | 0–5 | Spain |
|---|---|---|
| | Report | Torres 6', 14', 17'; Fàbregas 24'; Villa 48' |

Royal Bafokeng Stadium, Rustenburg
Attendance: 21,649
Referee: Coffi Codjia (Benin)

| New Zealand | Spain |

| GK | 12 | Glen Moss |
| RB | 17 | Dave Mulligan |
| CB | 18 | Andrew Boyens |
| CB | 6 | Ivan Vicelich |
| LB | 3 | Tony Lochhead |
| DM | 7 | Simon Elliott |
| RM | 11 | Leo Bertos |
| LM | 15 | Jeremy Brockie | (substituted off) 27' |
| AM | 8 | Tim Brown (c) |
| SS | 10 | Chris Killen | (substituted off) 85' |
| CF | 9 | Shane Smeltz | (substituted off) 76' |
Substitutions:
| MF | 14 | Jeremy Christie | (substituted on) 27' |
| MF | 16 | Chris James | (substituted on) 76' |
| FW | 21 | Kris Bright | (substituted on) 85' |
Manager:
Ricki Herbert

| GK | 1 | Iker Casillas (c) |
| RB | 15 | Sergio Ramos | (substituted off) 54' |
| CB | 2 | Raúl Albiol |
| CB | 5 | Carles Puyol |
| LB | 11 | Joan Capdevila |
| DM | 14 | Xabi Alonso |
| RM | 8 | Xavi | (substituted off) 54' |
| LM | 18 | Albert Riera |
| AM | 10 | Cesc Fàbregas |
| SS | 7 | David Villa |
| CF | 9 | Fernando Torres | (substituted off) 70' |
Substitutions:
| DF | 19 | Álvaro Arbeloa | (substituted on) 54' |
| MF | 20 | Santi Cazorla | (substituted on) 54' |
| MF | 21 | David Silva | (substituted on) 70' |
Manager:
Vicente del Bosque

Man of the Match:
Fernando Torres (Spain)

Assistant referees:
Komi Konyoh (Togo)
Alexis Fassinou (Benin)
Fourth official:
Massimo Busacca (Switzerland)
Fifth official:
Matthias Arnet (Switzerland)

=== Spain vs Iraq ===
17 June 2009
16:00 SAST

| Spain | 1–0 | Iraq |
|---|---|---|
| Villa 55' | Report |

Free State Stadium, Bloemfontein
Attendance: 30,512
Referee: Matthew Breeze (Australia)

| Spain | Iraq |

| GK | 1 | Iker Casillas (c) |
| RB | 15 | Sergio Ramos |
| CB | 3 | Gerard Piqué |
| CB | 4 | Carlos Marchena | (yellow card) 53' |
| LB | 11 | Joan Capdevila |
| DM | 14 | Xabi Alonso | (yellow card) 38' |
| RM | 20 | Santi Cazorla | | (substituted off) 67' |
| CM | 8 | Xavi | | (substituted off) 82' |
| LM | 22 | Juan Mata |
| SS | 7 | David Villa | | (substituted off) 74' |
| CF | 9 | Fernando Torres |
Substitutions:
| MF | 21 | David Silva | | (substituted on) 67' |
| FW | 17 | Dani Güiza | | (substituted on) 74' |
| MF | 12 | Sergio Busquets | | (substituted on) 82' |
Manager:
Vicente del Bosque

| GK | 12 | Mohammed Gassid |
| RB | 14 | Salam Shaker |
| CB | 2 | Mohammed Ali Karim |
| CB | 4 | Fareed Majeed |
| CB | 15 | Ali Rehema |
| LB | 3 | Bassim Abbas | (yellow card) 29' |
| DM | 22 | Muayad Khalid | | (substituted off) 74' |
| RM | 20 | Samer Saeed | | (substituted off) 76' |
| CM | 5 | Nashat Akram (c) | | (substituted off) 88' |
| LM | 11 | Hawar Mulla Mohammed |
| CF | 17 | Alaa Abdul-Zahra |
Substitutions:
| MF | 18 | Mahdi Karim | | (substituted on) 74' |
| MF | 13 | Karrar Jassim | | (substituted on) 76' |
| FW | 10 | Younis Mahmoud | | (substituted on) 88' |
Manager:
(Serbia) Bora Milutinović

Man of the Match:
Xabi Alonso (Spain)

Assistant referees:
Matthew Cream (Australia)
Ben Wilson (Australia)
Fourth official:
Eddy Maillet (Seychelles)
Fifth official:
Bechir Hassani (Tunisia)

=== South Africa vs New Zealand ===
17 June 2009
20:30 SAST

| South Africa | 2–0 | New Zealand |
|---|---|---|
| Parker 21', 52' | Report |

Royal Bafokeng Stadium, Rustenburg
Attendance: 36,598
Referee: Benito Archundia (Mexico)

| South Africa | New Zealand |

| GK | 16 | Itumeleng Khune |
| RB | 2 | Siboniso Gaxa |
| CB | 14 | Matthew Booth |
| CB | 4 | Aaron Mokoena (c) |
| LB | 3 | Tsepo Masilela |
| CM | 13 | Kagisho Dikgacoi |
| CM | 6 | MacBeth Sibaya |
| RW | 10 | Steven Pienaar | (yellow card) 80' |
| AM | 17 | Bernard Parker | | (substituted off) 81' |
| LW | 12 | Teko Modise |
| CF | 18 | Thembinkosi Fanteni | | (substituted off) 62' |
Substitutions:
| FW | 21 | Katlego Mashego | | (substituted on) 62' |
| FW | 8 | Siphiwe Tshabalala | | (substituted on) 81' |
Manager:
(Brazil) Joel Santana

| GK | 12 | Glen Moss |
| RB | 17 | Dave Mulligan |
| CB | 18 | Andrew Boyens | (yellow card) 72' |
| CB | 6 | Ivan Vicelich | (yellow card) 90+3' |
| LB | 3 | Tony Lochhead |
| DM | 7 | Simon Elliott |
| RM | 11 | Leo Bertos | | (substituted off) 66' |
| LM | 14 | Jeremy Christie | (yellow card) 53' |
| AM | 8 | Tim Brown (c) | | (substituted off) 55' |
| CF | 9 | Shane Smeltz | (yellow card) 85' |
| CF | 10 | Chris Killen | | (substituted off) 75' |
Substitutions:
| MF | 4 | Duncan Oughton | | (substituted on) 55' |
| MF | 16 | Chris James | | (substituted on) 66' |
| FW | 20 | Chris Wood | | (substituted on) 75' |
Manager:
Ricki Herbert

Man of the Match:
Bernard Parker (South Africa)

Assistant referees:
Marvin Torrentera (Mexico)
Héctor Vergara (Canada)
Fourth official:
Pablo Pozo (Chile)
Fifth official:
Patricio Basualto (Chile)

=== Iraq vs New Zealand ===
20 June 2009
20:30 SAST

| Iraq | 0–0 | New Zealand |
|---|---|---|
| | Report |

Ellis Park Stadium, Johannesburg
Attendance: 23,295
Referee: Howard Webb (England)

| Iraq | New Zealand |

| GK | 12 | Mohammed Gassid |
| RB | 2 | Mohammed Ali Karim |
| CB | 15 | Ali Rehema |
| CB | 14 | Salam Shaker |
| LB | 3 | Bassim Abbas |
| RM | 18 | Mahdi Karim | (substituted off) 67' |
| CM | 5 | Nashat Akram |
| CM | 11 | Hawar Mulla Mohammed | (substituted off) 46' |
| LM | 13 | Karrar Jassim |
| CF | 7 | Emad Mohammed | (substituted off) 56' |
| CF | 10 | Younis Mahmoud (c) |
Substitutions:
| MF | 4 | Fareed Majeed | (substituted on) 46' |
| FW | 17 | Alaa Abdul-Zahra | (substituted on) 56' |
| MF | 6 | Salih Sadir | (substituted on) 67' |
Manager:
(Serbia) Bora Milutinović

| GK | 12 | Glen Moss |
| RB | 2 | Aaron Scott | | (substituted off) 85' |
| CB | 5 | Ben Sigmund | | (substituted off) 71' |
| CB | 6 | Ivan Vicelich |
| LB | 3 | Tony Lochhead |
| DM | 7 | Simon Elliott |
| RM | 15 | Jeremy Brockie | (yellow card) 61' | (substituted off) 68' |
| CM | 8 | Tim Brown (c) | (yellow card) 35' |
| LM | 11 | Leo Bertos |
| SS | 9 | Shane Smeltz |
| CF | 10 | Chris Killen |
Substitutions:
| MF | 14 | Jeremy Christie | | (substituted on) 68' |
| MF | 18 | Andrew Boyens | | (substituted on) 71' |
| FW | 17 | Dave Mulligan | | (substituted on) 85' |
Manager:
Ricki Herbert

Man of the Match:
Shane Smeltz (New Zealand)

Assistant referees:
Peter Kirkup (England)
Michael Mullarkey (England)
Fourth official:
Jorge Larrionda (Uruguay)
Fifth official:
Mauricio Espinosa (Uruguay)

=== Spain vs South Africa ===
20 June 2009
20:30 SAST

| Spain | 2–0 | South Africa |
|---|---|---|
| Villa 52'; Llorente 72' | Report |

Free State Stadium, Bloemfontein
Attendance: 38,212
Referee: Pablo Pozo (Chile)

| Spain | South Africa |

| GK | 23 | Pepe Reina |
| RB | 5 | Carles Puyol (c) |
| CB | 3 | Gerard Piqué | (yellow card) 56' |
| CB | 2 | Raúl Albiol | (yellow card) 24' |
| LB | 19 | Álvaro Arbeloa |
| DM | 12 | Sergio Busquets |
| RM | 10 | Cesc Fàbregas |
| LM | 18 | Albert Riera | | (substituted off) 81' |
| AM | 8 | Xavi |
| SS | 7 | David Villa | | (substituted off) 60' |
| CF | 9 | Fernando Torres | | (substituted off) 60' |
Substitutions:
| MF | 6 | Pablo Hernández | | (substituted on) 60' |
| FW | 16 | Fernando Llorente | | (substituted on) 60' |
| MF | 20 | Santi Cazorla | | (substituted on) 81' |
Manager:
Vicente del Bosque

| GK | 16 | Itumeleng Khune |
| RB | 2 | Siboniso Gaxa |
| CB | 4 | Aaron Mokoena (c) |
| CB | 14 | Matthew Booth |
| LB | 3 | Tsepo Masilela |
| CM | 5 | Benson Mhlongo |
| CM | 6 | MacBeth Sibaya | (yellow card) 5' | (substituted off) 83' |
| RW | 10 | Steven Pienaar |
| AM | 13 | Kagisho Dikgacoi | (yellow card) 54' |
| LW | 12 | Teko Modise | (yellow card) 53' |
| CF | 17 | Bernard Parker | | (substituted off) 90+3' |
Substitutions:
| FW | 21 | Katlego Mashego | | (substituted on) 83' |
| FW | 8 | Siphiwe Tshabalala | | (substituted on) 90+3' |
Manager:
(Brazil) Joel Santana

Man of the Match:
Xavi (Spain)

Assistant referees:
Patricio Basualto (Chile)
Francisco Mondria (Chile)
Fourth official:
Eddy Maillet (Seychelles)
Fifth official:
Bechir Hassani (Tunisia)

| Team | Pld | W | D | L | GF | GA | GD | Pts |
|---|---|---|---|---|---|---|---|---|
| Oman | 3 | 2 | 1 | 0 | 6 | 0 | +6 | 7 |
| Kuwait | 3 | 1 | 2 | 0 | 2 | 1 | +1 | 5 |
| Bahrain | 3 | 1 | 0 | 2 | 3 | 4 | −1 | 3 |
| Iraq | 3 | 0 | 1 | 2 | 2 | 8 | −6 | 1 |

== Domestic clubs in international tournaments ==
=== 2009 AFC Cup ===
Iraq was excluded from the AFC Champions League due to not fulfilling the AFC demand of having a fully professional league. Hence, the Iraqi clubs relegated to the AFC Cup with having 2 seats to participate in. The 2007–08 Iraqi Premier League's Champion (Arbil FC) and runners-up (Al-Zawraa) will participate this season.

==== Group B ====
| Team | Pld | W | D | L | GF | GA | GD | Pts |
|---|---|---|---|---|---|---|---|---|
| (Iraq) Al-Zawraa | 6 | 4 | 1 | 1 | 8 | 3 | +5 | 13 |
| (Lebanon) Safa | 6 | 4 | 0 | 2 | 5 | 3 | +2 | 12 |
| (Yemen) Al-Hilal Al-Sahili | 6 | 2 | 1 | 3 | 5 | 7 | −2 | 7 |
| (Oman) Al-Suwaiq | 6 | 1 | 0 | 5 | 3 | 8 | −5 | 3 |

2009-03-10
19:00 UTC+3

| Al-Zawraa (Iraq) | 2 – 0 | (Yemen) Al-Hilal Al-Sahili |
|---|---|---|
| Salar Abdul-Jabar 6'; Omar Kadhim 88' | Summary; Report |

Al-Maktoum Stadium, Dubai, UAE
Attendance: 150
Referee: (United Arab Emirates) Mohamed Al Zarouni

2009-03-17
18:00 UTC+3

| Safa (Lebanon) | 1 – 0 | (Iraq) Al-Zawraa |
|---|---|---|
| Guy Charles Jimgou 35' | Report |

Beirut Municipal Stadium, Beirut
Attendance: 700
Referee: (Uzbekistan) Vladislav Tseytlin

2009-04-07
19:00 UTC+3

| Al-Zawraa (Iraq) | 2 – 0 | (Oman) Al-Suwaiq |
|---|---|---|
| Haidar Sabah 29'; Sajjad Hussein 90+3' | Report |

Al-Maktoum Stadium, Dubai, UAE
Attendance: 200
Referee: (Iran) Saeid Mozaffarizadehyazdi

2009-04-21
19:15 UTC+4

| Al-Suwaiq (Oman) | 0 – 1 | (Iraq) Al-Zawraa |
|---|---|---|
| | Report | Ahmad Ibrahim 56' |

Seeb Stadium, Seeb
Attendance: 500
Referee: (Jordan) Mohammad Mousa Khalaf

2009-05-05
15:45 UTC+3

| Al-Hilal Al-Sahili (Yemen) | 1 – 1 | (Iraq) Al-Zawraa |
|---|---|---|
| Yaser Ba Suhai 76' | Report | Adnan Attiya 85' |

Ali Mohsen Al-Muraisi Stadium, Sanaa
Attendance: 1,000
Referee: (Syria) Racho Abdulrrhman

2009-05-19
19:00 UTC+3

| Al-Zawraa (Iraq) | 2 – 1 | (Lebanon) Safa |
|---|---|---|
| Ous Ibrahim 45+2'; Mustafa Ahmad 90+5' | Report | Khodor Salame 31' |

Al-Maktoum Stadium, Dubai, UAE
Attendance: 300
Referee: (Turkmenistan) Kakabay Seydov

==== Group C ====
| Team | Pld | W | D | L | GF | GA | GD | Pts |
|---|---|---|---|---|---|---|---|---|
| (Kuwait) Al-Arabi | 6 | 3 | 2 | 1 | 11 | 6 | +5 | 11 |
| (Iraq) Arbil | 6 | 2 | 2 | 2 | 8 | 7 | +1 | 8 |
| (Oman) Al-Orouba | 6 | 2 | 2 | 2 | 6 | 7 | −1 | 8 |
| (Lebanon) Al-Mabarrah | 6 | 2 | 0 | 4 | 7 | 12 | −5 | 6 |

2009-03-10
18:00 UTC+3

| Al-Mabarrah (Lebanon) | 1 – 0 | (Iraq) Arbil |
|---|---|---|
| Ali El Atat 20' | (Report) (Summary) |

Beirut Municipal Stadium, Beirut
Attendance: 1,000
Referee: (Yemen) Mukhtar Al Yarimi

2009-03-17
16:00 UTC+3

| Arbil (Iraq) | 1 – 1 | (Kuwait) Al-Arabi |
|---|---|---|
| Muslim Mubarak 37' | (Report) | Firas Al Khatib 74' |

King Abdullah Stadium, Amman, Jordan
Attendance: 200
Referee: (Bahrain) Nawaf Abdulla Ghayyath

2009-04-07
19:15 UTC+4

| Al-Oruba (Oman) | 1 – 1 | (Iraq) Arbil |
|---|---|---|
| Younis Mubarak 43' | Report | Luay Salah 49' |

Seeb Stadium, Seeb
Attendance: 2,000
Referee: (Kyrgyzstan) Dmitry Mashentsev

2009-04-21
16:00 UTC+3

| Arbil (Iraq) | 3 – 0 | (Oman) Al-Oruba |
|---|---|---|
| Luay Salah 43'; Ahmad Salah 49'; Muslim Mubarak 77' | Report |

Prince Mohammad Stadium, Zarqa, Jordan
Attendance: 300
Referee: (Thailand) Chaiya Mahapab

2009-05-05
17:00 UTC+3

| Arbil (Iraq) | 3 – 2 | (Lebanon) Al-Mabarrah |
|---|---|---|
| Muslim Mubarak 4'; Ahmad Salah 30' (pen.); Ali Mansour 72' | Report | Joao Alfredo 3'; Tarek Al Ali 76' |

Prince Mohammad Stadium, Zarqa, Jordan
Attendance: 200
Referee: (Jordan) Naser Al-Ghafary

2009-05-19
20:15 UTC+3

| Al-Arabi (Kuwait) | 2 – 0 | (Iraq) Arbil |
|---|---|---|
| Firas Al Khatib 39', 86' | Report |

Sabah Al Salem Stadium, Kuwait City
Attendance: 1,000
Referee: (Saudi Arabia) Khalid Alzahrani

==== Round of 16 ====
2009-05-26
18:00 UTC+3

| Al-Zawraa (Iraq) | 1 – 3 | (Iraq) Arbil |
|---|---|---|
| Adnan Attiya 76' | Report | Ahmad Salah 44'; Luay Salah 67'; Ahmad Abd Ali 70' |

Al-Maktoum Stadium, Dubai, UAE
Attendance: 200
Referee: (Qatar) Abdulrahman Abdou

=== Quarter finals ===
==== First leg ====
2009-09-15
21:00 UTC+3

| Al-Kuwait | 1 – 1 | (Iraq) Arbil |
|---|---|---|
| Al Azemi 7' | Report | Mahdi 68' |

Al Kuwait SC Stadium, Kuwait City
Attendance: 2,800
Referee: Abdul Malik (Singapore)

==== Second leg ====
2009-09-30
18:00 UTC+3

| Arbil (Iraq) | 0 – 1 | Al-Kuwait |
|---|---|---|
| | Report | Rogerio 74' |

Franso Hariri Stadium, Arbil
Referee: Mohsen Torky (Iran)

=== Final ===
2009-11-03
19:30 UTC+3

| Al-Kuwait | 2 – 1 | (Syria) Al-Karamah |
|---|---|---|
| Hakem 16'; Sulaiman 90+4' | Report | Al Shbli 82' |

Al Kuwait Sports Club Stadium, Kuwait City
Attendance: 17,400
Referee: Masoud Moradi (Iran)

== Thaghr al-Iraq Championship ==
The 2009 Thagher al-Iraq Tournament or 2009 Thaghr Al Iraq Championship was a pre-season men's football friendly tournament hosted by Branch of Basra in Iraq Football Association, between clubs of cities that located in south of Iraq; (Basra, Dhi Qar and Amarah), that play in Iraqi Premier League and that play in Iraqi First Division League.

The 2009 Thagher al-Iraq Tournament took place on 14–21 December 2009 and featured Al-Mina'a, Al-Bahri, Naft Al-Junoob, Ghaz Al-Junoob, Al-Nassriya, and Naft Maysan.

The winners of the tournament were Al-Mina'a, who defeated Naft Al-Junoob in the final.

=== Group stage ===
The first place (shaded in green) qualified to the final.

==== Group A ====
| Team | Pld | W | D | L | GF | GA | GD | Pts |
|---|---|---|---|---|---|---|---|---|
| Al-Mina'a | 2 | 2 | 0 | 0 | 7 | 1 | +6 | 6 |
| Ghaz Al-Junoob | 2 | 0 | 1 | 1 | 1 | 4 | −3 | 1 |
| Naft Maysan | 2 | 0 | 1 | 1 | 0 | 3 | −3 | 1 |

14 December 2009
2:00

| Al-Mina'a | 3–0 | Naft Maysan |
|---|---|---|
| Falah 51'; Jassem 55'; Kadhim 75' | report |

Al Mina'a Stadium
Referee: Ahmed Shaker

16 December 2009
2:00

| Al-Mina'a | 4–1 | Ghaz Al-Junoob |
|---|---|---|
| Abdul Hussein 12', 52'; Abdul Razzak 70'; Hadi 85' | report | Abdul Razzak 65' |

Al Mina'a Stadium
Referee: Rasheed Hussein

18 December 2009
2:00

| Ghaz Al-Junoob | 0–0 | Naft Maysan |

Al Mina'a Stadium
Referee: Ahmed Shaker

==== Group B ====
| Team | Pld | W | D | L | GF | GA | GD | Pts |
|---|---|---|---|---|---|---|---|---|
| Naft Al-Junoob | 2 | 2 | 0 | 0 | 5 | 1 | +4 | 6 |
| Al-Bahri | 2 | 0 | 1 | 1 | 1 | 2 | −1 | 1 |
| Al-Nassriya | 2 | 0 | 1 | 1 | 0 | 3 | −3 | 1 |

15 December 2009
2:00

| Naft Al-Junoob | 3–0 | Al-Nassriya |
|---|---|---|
| Jabbar 40' (pen.); Kadhim 75'; Yousuf 77' | report | Matroud (red card) 38' |

Al Mina'a Stadium
Referee: Adnan Shaea

17 December 2009
2:00

| Al-Bahri | 0–0 | Al-Nassriya |

Al Mina'a Stadium
Referee: Rasheed Hussein

19 December 2009
2:00

| Naft Al-Junoob | 2–1 | Al-Bahri |
|---|---|---|
| Jabbar (penalty missed) 17'; Aoda 73'; Kadhim 90+2' | | Aziz 43' |

Al Mina'a Stadium
Referee: Ahmed Shaker

=== Final ===
21 December 2009
2:00

| Al-Mina'a | 2–1 | Naft Al-Junoob |
|---|---|---|
| Falah 45+1'; Hadi (red card) 65'; Ahmed 79' | report | Yousuf 10'; Hameed (red card) 74'; Nayrouz (red card) 81' |

Al Mina'a Stadium
Referee: Ahmed Shaker

2009 Thaghr al-Iraq Championship winners
