= Baghdad Cup =

Football match

2013 Baghdad Cup
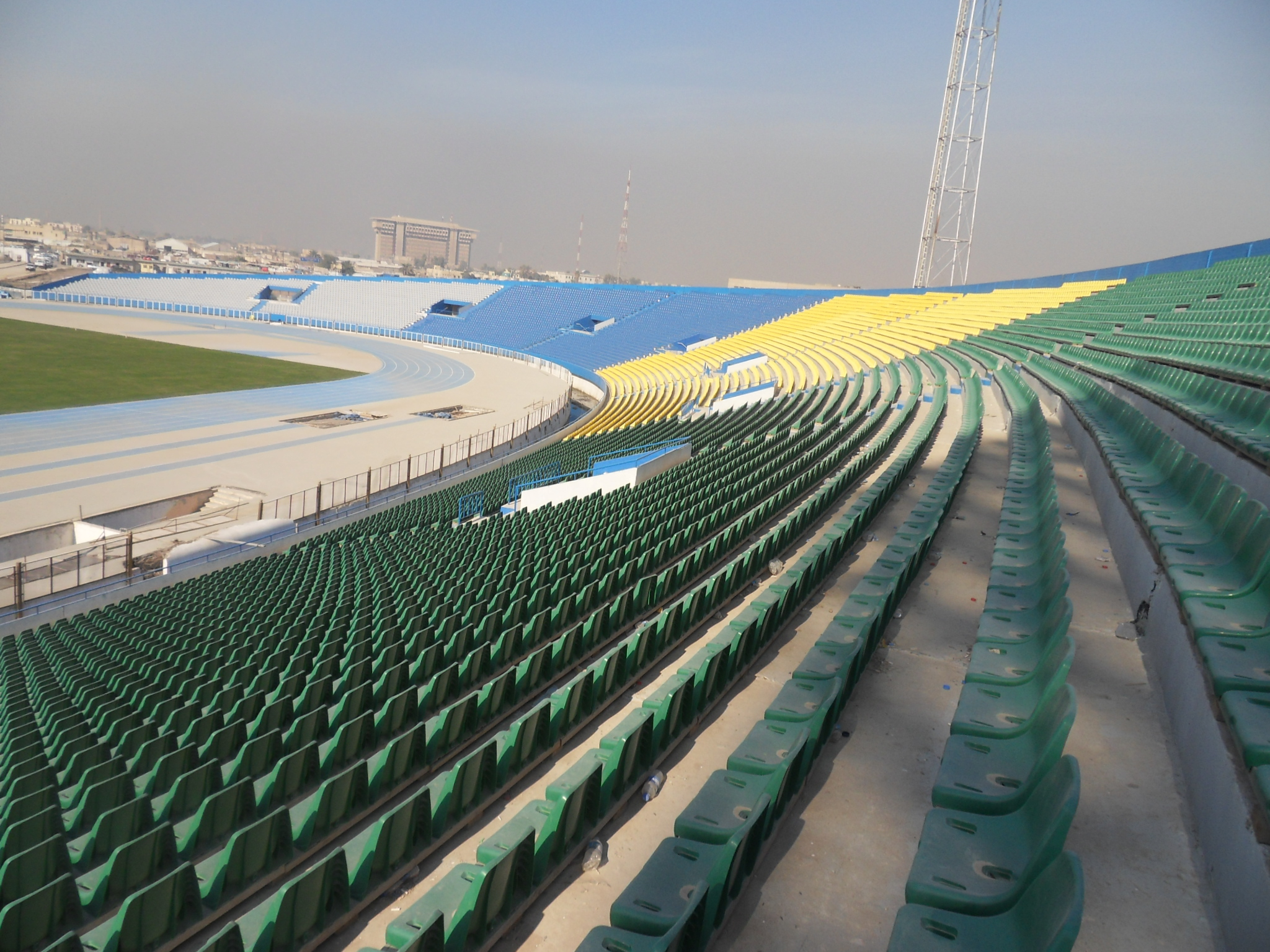
- The match took place at Al-Shaab Stadium
| Al-Shorta | Al-Zawraa |
| 1 | 0 |
- Festival of Brotherhood, Love and Peace
- Date: 16 June 2013
- Venue: Al-Shaab Stadium, Baghdad

The Baghdad Cup (Arabic: كأس بغداد) was a friendly football match hosted by Al-Shaab Stadium to conclude the Festival of Brotherhood, Love and Peace (Arabic: مهرجان التأخي والمحبة والسلام), an event organised by the Iraqi Ministry of Youth and Sports on 16 June 2013. The match was contested by two of the country's top clubs, Al-Shorta and Al-Zawraa, and fans were allowed free entry into the stadium for the occasion.

Al-Kadhimiya and Al-Adhamiya played against each other in a 30-minute match to open the festival; Al-Kadhimiya won 1–0 with a goal by Raddad Suhail and were awarded with the Love and Peace Cup trophy. Al-Shorta and Al-Zawraa then faced off for the Baghdad Cup trophy which was won by Al-Shorta with a winning goal from substitute striker Hussein Karim in the 57th minute.

== Match ==
=== Details ===
16 June 2013
15:45 GMT

| Al-Shorta | 1–0 | Al-Zawraa |
|---|---|---|
| H. Karim 57' |

Al-Shaab Stadium, Baghdad

| Al-Shorta | Al-Zawraa |

| GK | 12 | (Iraq) Mohammed Gassid |
| RB | 6 | (Iraq) Qasim Zaidan |
| CB | 22 | (Cameroon) Innocent Awoa |
| CB | 20 | (Iraq) Fareed Majeed (c) |
| LB | 19 | (Iraq) Ahmad Ayad |
| RM | 14 | (Iraq) Amjad Kalaf |
| CM | 5 | (Iraq) Hussein Abdul-Wahed |
| CM | 35 | (Iraq) Ahmad Fadhel |
| LM | 8 | (Iraq) Mohammed Faisel |
| CF | 10 | (Iraq) Muslim Mubarak |
| CF | 13 | (Nigeria) Minusu Buba |
Manager:
(Iraq) Thair Jassam

| GK | 22 | (Iraq) Ammar Ali |
| RB | 3 | (Syria) Hussein Jwayed |
| CB | 5 | (Iraq) Aqeel Qasim |
| CB | 2 | (Iraq) Ashraf Abdul-Karim |
| LB | 26 | (Iraq) Ous Ibrahim (c) |
| RM | 33 | (Iraq) Namir Hameed |
| CM | 16 | (Syria) Zaher Midani |
| CM | 29 | (Iraq) Ayad Ibrahim |
| LM | 13 | (Iraq) Amjad Waleed |
| CF | 10 | (Iraq) Marwan Hussein |
| CF | 27 | (Lebanon) Ibrahim Bahsoun |
Manager:
(Iraq) Radhi Shenaishil
