= Dhurgham Ismail =

Iraqi footballer (born 1994)

Dhurgham Ismail ضرغام إسماعيل
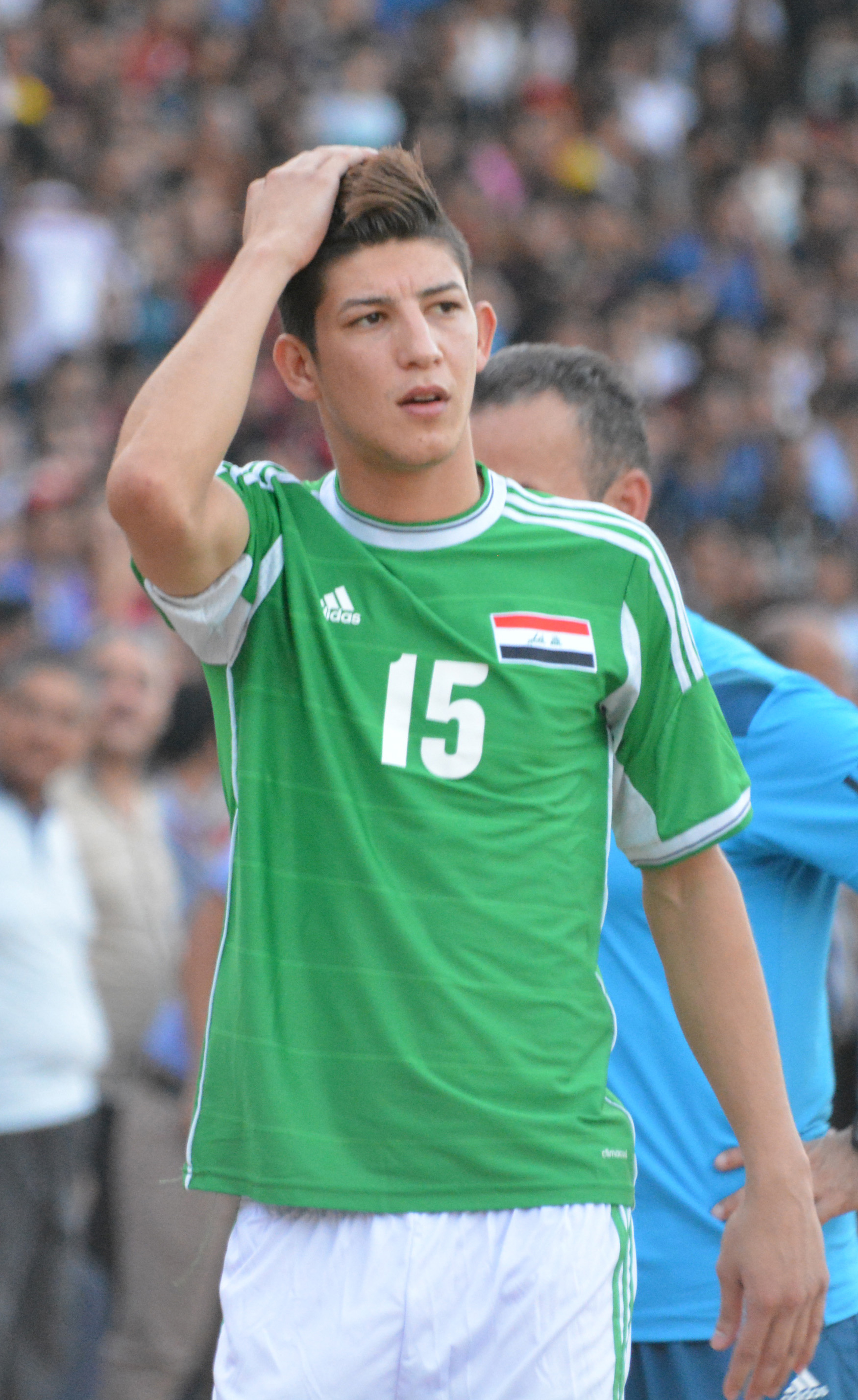
- Ismail Al-Quraishi with Iraq U23 in 2014

Personal information
- Full name: Dhurgham Ismail Dawoud Al-Quraishi
- Date of birth: 23 May 1994 (age 32)
- Place of birth: Amarah, Maysan Province, Iraq
- Height: 1.78 m (5 ft 10 in)
- Position: Left-back

Team information
- Current team: Al-Zawraa
- Number: 11

Youth career
- 2009–2010: Naft Maysan

Senior career*
Years	Team	Apps	(Gls)
2010–2015	Al-Shorta	104	(21)
2015–2018	Çaykur Rizespor	52	(1)
2018–2020	Al-Shorta	22	(0)
2020–2021	Al-Zawraa		
2021–2022	Al-Quwa Al-Jawiya		
2022–2023	Al-Talaba		
2023–2025	Al-Khaldiya		
2025–	Al-Zawraa		

International career^{‡}
2009–2010	Iraq U17	8	(1)
2011–2013	Iraq U20	10	(4)
2011–2016	Iraq U23	12	(1)
2013–	Iraq	72	(4)
Medal record
Representing Iraq
Men's football
Asian Games
Bronze medal – third place	2014 Incheon	Team
AFC U-22 Championship
Winner	2013 AFC U-22 Championship	Team
Arabian Gulf Cup
Runner-up	21st Arabian Gulf Cup	Team
Winner	25th Arabian Gulf Cup	Team
- * Club domestic league appearances and goals as of 20:23, 26 October 2025 (UTC) ‡ National team caps and goals as of 20:23, 26 October 2025 (UTC)

Dhurgham Ismail Dawoud Al-Quraishi (Arabic: ضرغام إسماعيل داوود القريشي; born 23 May 1994), better known as Dhurgham Ismail, is an Iraqi professional footballer who plays as a left back or left winger for Al-Zawraa and for the Iraqi national team.

== Early career ==
Dhurgham Ismail was born on May 23, 1994, in the city of Amarah in Maysan province, in south-eastern Iraq. Dhurgham has represented Iraq for the U-17s, U-19s, U-23s and the senior national side.

The left back joined the Iraq FA youth system in 2010 after FA member Yahya Zaghir, the secretary of Naft Maysan, where he was a youth player, took the footballer to Iraq U-17 coach Muwafaq Hussein and presented him as “a player from Al-Sadr City,” a city within a city in the Iraqi capital. In November 2010, Ismail signed a five-year contract for Al Shorta at the age of 16.

Dhurgham was a footballer from the province and for decades the Iraqi youth sides had been dominated by Baghdad-based players, both because of the prejudice against the provincial talent and the close proximity from the youth sides training facilities in the Iraqi capital and with only a few coaches scouting around the country for new talent. Yahya Zaghir may have believed it was better for Dhargham to be labelled a player from Baghdad rather than face the prejudice of coming from the provinces. Two years later, the gifted left sided defender was the star of the Under 17s side, wearing the No.9 with presenter Haidar Al-Wattar praising him on the MBC channel.

== Club career ==
=== Al Shorta ===
==== 2010–11 ====
He made his debut in Al Shorta's first match of the 2010–11 Iraqi Premier League, against Al-Karkh SC, on 27 November 2010, where it ended in a 0–0 draw. In his first season, he quickly made his position in the starting eleven squad with the squad number 13, being picked to start in many games, after the departure of the club's first choice left back, Ahmad Kadhim Assad, in September 2010.

He scored his first goal on 9 February 2011, a long-range effort into the top corner against giants Erbil SC, at the 35th minute, in a match that ended in a 3–1 win for Al Shorta. His cross from the left flank led to the very last goal that club legend Hashim Ridha scored for Al Shorta in a defeat to Ramadi FC, and Ismail scored his second goal on 1 July 2011, against Samarra FC, in a match that ended in another 3–1 win. This was a crucial win for Al Shorta in the battle to avoid relegation.

Al Shorta ended the 2010–11 season with them being in 8th place in the North Group, escaping relegation by goal difference. Al Shorta's defense, that includes Ismail, have conceded 23 goals in that season.

==== 2011–12 ====
Ismail was handed the number 3 shirt for the season. Upon earning his starting role in the squad, Ismail had assists in a lot of matches from the 2011–12 Iraqi Premier League, mostly crossing long balls into the penalty area. He also scored two goals in this season: one of them was on 3 March 2012, against Zakho FC, in a 2–0 win for Al Shorta. The second one was on 19 March 2012, against Al-Hedood, in another 2–0 win.

Ismail was nominated by the head coach of Al-Zawra'a, Radhi Shenaishil, and the head coach of Al Shorta, Mohammed Tabra, as left back of the Al-Batal Magazine Team of the Season. Al-Quwa Al-Jawiya's Hussam Kadhim was picked for the position.

Al Shorta ended the 2011–12 season with them being in 7th place and conceding 37 goals.

==== 2012–13 ====
The 2012–13 season was the first season for Ismail to win a title. On 22 November 2012, Ismail wore the captain's armband for Al Shorta for the first time against Masafi Al-Wasat, after Amjad Kalaf was substituted off in the second half. He scored Al Shorta's only goal against Sulaymaniya FC in Round 9, a curling shot from the outside of his boot, and also scored against Al-Mina'a SC from a free-kick, Zakho FC, Masafi Al-Wasat, and scored the last goal for Al Shorta in the season, against Talaba SC, on 4 September 2013 which secured the league title for the club, resulting in five goals for Ismail in this season, which was the most he had in one season.

Al Shorta won their first league shield since the 1997–98 season and their third one as a total, just two years after finishing +5 goal difference away from relegation. They also achieved the 2013 Baghdad Cup, but Ismail wasn't included in the squad due to being on international duty.

==== 2013–14 ====
Ismail appeared in most matches of the 2013–14 season, where he scored a goal against Duhok SC, Naft Al-Janoob from a penalty and scored two goals against Naft Maysan, which is the first time that he scored two goals in one match for Al Shorta, and also had two assists. The 2014 AFC Champions League qualifiers was the first international club competition that Ismail participated in; he played the last 23 minutes of the qualifying match which Al Shorta lost by one goal to Kuwait SC. He also started in all of the six games that Al Shorta played in the 2014 AFC Cup.

Al Shorta topped the Iraqi League standings for the second time in the row, although the league was ended prematurely, but were unable to qualify to the 2014 AFC Cup knock-out stage.

==== 2014–15 ====
In the 2014–15 season, Ismail scored 8 goals, becoming the second top scorer of Al Shorta, below Marwan Hussein at 15 goals. His goals were scored against Najaf FC, Al-Hedood, Baghdad FC, Al-Mina'a SC, Al-Naft and Al-Zawra'a SC. Ismail also appeared in 5 matches of the 2015 AFC Cup out of 7 that Al Shorta played, scoring a goal against Taraji Wadi Al-Nes in a match that ended in a 6–2 win for Al-Shorta, and he had 4 assists in the tournament.

Al Shorta had the 3rd place in the league and were eliminated from the 2015 AFC Cup Round of 16 by Kuwait SC.

While Ismail renewed his contract for Al Shorta for one more year, offers were presented by Spanish club Girona FC, Iranian club Persepolis and Turkish club Çaykur Rizespor in July 2015 to sign him.

=== Çaykur Rizespor ===
On 15 August 2015, Ismail transferred from Al Shorta to Çaykur Rizespor, signing a five-year contract to play in the Turkish Süper Lig, dubbed Rizespor's new Ali Adnan, who had left earlier in the window to Serie A club Udinese, even taking the number 53 shirt previously worn by his international teammate. He made his league debut on 19 September 2015, playing as a left midfielder for the full match in a 5–1 win over Antalyaspor. In his second match, in the Turkish Cup against Ankara Adliyespor, he played as a left back rather than a midfielder in the match that ended in a 2–0 victory for Rizespor. Dhurgham Ismail scored his first goal in Turkey as his team beat Sivasspor 2–0 in the cup. His first league goal for Rizespor came in Dhurgham's 2nd season at the club where he scored against Alanyaspor as the game ended in a 3–2 win for his club. In 2017 Dhurgham suffered a long-term injury and missed the entire 2017–18 season as he was recovering from the injury. With his condition not improving, Dhurgham was released from Rizespor, two years before his contract was due to expire.

=== Return to Al-Shorta ===
In 2018 Al-Shorta announced that Dhurgham had returned to his former club and would continue recovering from his injury with the club. Dhurgham took number 11 on his return to his former club and was instantly named vice-captain, although he would go on to captain the club several times throughout the 2018-19 title-winning season and the short 2019-20 season. Dhurgham's first season back at Al-Shorta was very successful as they dominated the league under Montenegrin manager Nebojša Jovović, who would become the first European manager to win the Iraqi Premier League in history, with the strike-force of Mohanad Ali and Alaa Abdul-Zahra scoring 47 goals, leading to Europe's biggest clubs bidding over Mimi. Dhurgham lifted the title with his teammates at the end of the season as Al-Shorta qualified for the 2019 Iraqi Super Cup, which they would win, and the 2020 AFC Champions League. With his second season back at the club being suspended due to political protests in the country and then restarted before being cancelled due to the COVID-19 pandemic, Dhurgham was only able to make 5 league appearances. On the 20th of June 2020, Dhurgham announced that his time at Al-Shorta had come to an end and he would be joining Baghdad rivals Al-Zawraa ahead of the next season, making them the first club other than Al-Shorta he would play for in Iraq at the senior level, after a total of 7 years for Al-Qeethara.

=== Al-Zawraa ===
In the summer of 2020, Dhurgham signed for Iraqi giants Al-Zawra'a.

== International career ==
=== Iraq U-17 ===
Ismail's first international tournament for the Iraq national U-17 team was the 2009 WAFF U-16 Championship, where Iraq ended in 3rd place, which was Ismail's first international achievement. In the 2010 AFC U-16 Championship, Ismail scored his first international goal, on 27 October 2010, against Kuwait in a 3–0 win for Iraq.

=== Iraq U-20 ===
Ismail's first tournament with the Iraq national U-20 team was the 2011 Arab Cup U-20, where Iraq didn't get passed the group stage.

Although he was not included in the 2012 AFC U-19 Championship squad, Ismail was part of the 2012 Arab Cup U-20, where he scored a goal against Syria, but Iraq eventually finished in the bottom of Group C.

Ismail was included in the 2013 FIFA U-20 World Cup squad, playing as a left back. He was subbed off for Ammar Abdul-Hussein in the first match, against England, subbed in for Mahdi Kamel, against Egypt, subbed in at half time for Abdul-Hussein, against Paraguay. Being subbed in at the 112th minute, Ismail scored his penalty kick during the penalty shoot-out, against South Korea, in the quarterfinal. He didn't play in the semifinal, where Iraq lost, but he started in the third place match, where they lost 0–3.

=== Iraq U-23 ===
Ismail's first tournament for the Iraq national U-23 team was the 2013 AFC U-22 Championship. He started in all of the six matches that Iraq played, scoring a goal in the first match, against Saudi Arabia, in a match that ended in a 3–1 win for Iraq, and having an assist against Uzbekistan. Iraq won the final, against Saudi Arabia, achieving the tournament, which was the first international trophy for Ismail.

In the 2014 Asian Games, Ismail appeared in 5 matches and missed two. In all of the matches he played, Ismail didn't play a full game, being subbed off at the 60th minute, against Nepal, subbed in at the 75th minute, against Kuwait, subbed in at the 75th minute, against Tajikistan, subbed off at the 30th minute, against Saudi Arabia, and subbed in at the 86th minute, against Thailand.

=== Iraq ===
On 12 January 2013, Ismail made his senior International debut with the number 20, against Yemen, in the 21st Arabian Gulf Cup group stage, where he scored a debut goal from a free kick. Ismail went on to appear in the semifinal, being subbed in at the 111th minute for Humam Tariq, against Bahrain, and successfully score his penalty kick during the penalty shoot-out after a 1–1 draw. He also was subbed in for the final, at the 53rd minute, for Ahmed Yasin Ghani, against the United Arab Emirates, where Iraq lost 1–2 and became runners-up.

On 29 December 2014, Ismail was included in Iraq's squad for the 2015 AFC Asian Cup, playing as a left back. He started in all of the six matches they played. Ismail was named Man of the Match in the quarterfinal, against Iran, for creating the attack that led to the second goal for Iraq, by shooting the ball that gets deflected off the keeper and onto Younis Mahmoud's head, who headers it in, and by scoring Iraq's third goal from a penalty as they drew 3–3 at Canberra Stadium and eventually prevailed 7–6 on a penalty shootout, in which Ismail scored his kick. Iraq finished fourth in the tournament after losing for the United Arab Emirates at the third place match 2–3. Due to his performance, Ismail was included in the Team of the Tournament as the best left back.

Ismail scored his third goal for the national team on his fourth appearance in the 2018 FIFA World Cup qualification, against Chinese Taipei, at the 18th minute, by a cross from Younis Mahmoud.

== Career statistics ==
=== Club ===
As of match played 7 March 2020

Club	Season	League			Cup (Note: Includes cup competitions such as the Iraq FA Cup and the Turkish Cup)		Continental (Note: Includes continental competitions such as Asia, Arab and Europe)		Other (Note: Includes other competitions such as Iraqi Super Cup)		Total	
Club	Season	Division	Apps	Goals	Apps	Goals	Apps	Goals	Apps	Goals	Apps	Goals
Al Shorta	2010–11	Iraqi Premier League	104	2	—		—		—		116	2
Al Shorta	2011–12	Iraqi Premier League	104	2	—		—		—		116	2
Al Shorta	2012–13	Iraqi Premier League	104	5	—		—		—		116	5
Al Shorta	2013–14	Iraqi Premier League	104	4	—		7 (Note: One appearance in AFC Champions League, six appearances in AFC Cup)	0	—		116	4
Al Shorta	2014–15	Iraqi Premier League	104	8	—		5 (Note: Appearances in AFC Cup)	1	—		116	9
Al Shorta	Total		104	21	—		12	1	—		116	22
Çaykur Rizespor	2015–16	Süper Lig	20	0	8	1	—		—		28	1
Çaykur Rizespor	2016–17	Süper Lig	32	1	8	0	—		—		40	1
Çaykur Rizespor	Total		52	1	16	1	—		—		68	2
Al-Shorta	2018–19	Iraqi Premier League	17	0	1	0	—		—		18	0
Al-Shorta	2019–20	Iraqi Premier League	5	0	0	0	2 (Note: Appearances in Arab Club Champions Cup)	0	1	0	8	0
Al-Shorta	Total		22	0	1	0	2	0	1	0	26	0
Career total			178	22	17	1	14	1	1	0	210	24

=== International ===
As of match played 22 March 2024

Iraq
Year	Apps	Goals
2013	12	1
2014	6	0
2015	14	2
2016	7	0
2017	2	0
2019	12	0
2021	8	0
2022	3	0
2023	5	0
2024	1	0
Total	70	3

=== International goals ===
Scores and results list Iraq's goal tally first.

#	Date	Venue	Opponent	Score	Result	Competition
1	12 January 2013	Khalifa Sports City Stadium, Isa Town	Yemen	1–0	2–0	21st Arabian Gulf Cup
2	23 January 2015	Canberra Stadium, Canberra	Iran	3–2	3–3 (a.e.t.) (7–6 p)	2015 AFC Asian Cup
3	17 November 2015	National Stadium, Kaohsiung	Chinese Taipei	1–0	2–0	2018 FIFA World Cup qualification
4.	18 March 2022	Al-Madina Stadium, Baghdad	Zambia	1–0	3–1	Friendly

== Honours ==
Al-Shorta

- Iraqi Premier League: 2012–13, 2018–19
- Iraqi Super Cup: 2019

Çaykur Rizespor

- TFF First League: 2017–18

Al-Khaldiya

- Bahraini Premier League: 2023–24
- Bahraini King's Cup: 2024–25
- Bahraini Super Cup: 2023
- Khalid bin Hamad Cup: 2025

Iraq

- Arabian Gulf Cup: 2023

Individual

- AFC Asian Cup Team of the Tournament: 2015
- Turkish Super Lig U-22 Young Players’ Team of the Season 2016–17
- World Soccer's Most Important 500 Players of the Year: 2015
- FourFourTwo's 50 Best Asian Players of the Year: 2015

== Personal life ==
Ismail belongs to Iraq's Shia community. His cousin, Ahmed Hasan Maknzi, also a left-back, plays for Al Zawraa and the Iraq U-20s.
