= Amjad Kalaf =

Iraqi footballer (born 1991)

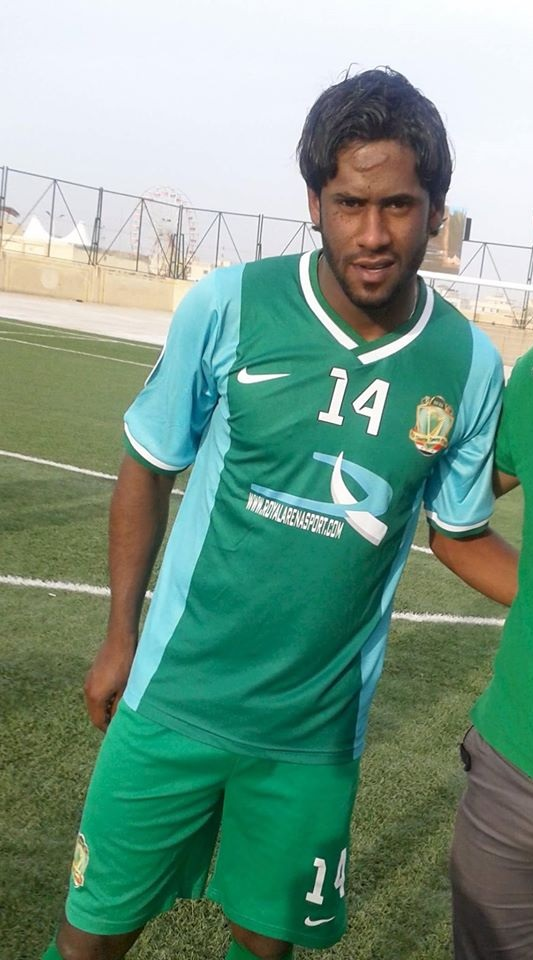
- Kalaf with Al-Shorta in 2014

Personal information
- Full name: Amjad Kalaf Mansour Al-Muntafiq
- Date of birth: 20 March 1991 (age 35)
- Place of birth: Kut, Iraq
- Height: 1.75 m (5 ft 9 in)
- Positions: Right winger; striker

Youth career
- Al-Kut

Senior career*
Years	Team	Apps	(Gls)
2005–2007	Al-Kut		
2007–2010	Al-Shorta		(15)
2010	Erbil	0	(0)
2010–2016	Al-Shorta		(43)
2017–2018	Al-Zawraa	38	(6)
2018–2019	Al-Talaba		(2)
Total		–	(66+)

International career
2005–2007	Iraq U17		(2)
2009–2010	Iraq U20	7	(1)
2011–2014	Iraq U23		(3)
2009–2017	Iraq	30	(1)
Medal record
Representing Iraq
Men's football
WAFF Championship
Runner-up	2012 Kuwait	Senior Team
AFC U-22 Championship
Winner	2013 Oman	U22 Team
Asian Games
Bronze medal – third place	2014 Incheon	Olympic Team
- * Club domestic league appearances and goals

Amjad Kalaf Mansour Al-Muntafiq (Arabic: أَمْجَد كَلَف مَنْصُور الْمُنْتَفِق; born 20 March 1991) is an Iraqi former professional footballer who played as a right winger and sometimes as a striker.

Kalaf represented Al-Kut, Al-Shorta, Al-Zawraa and Al-Talaba in the Iraqi Premier League. On the international level, Kalaf played 30 matches for Iraq, scoring against the United Arab Emirates in the 2015 AFC Asian Cup.

Kalaf played for Al-Shorta from 2007 to 2016, saving the club from relegation in 2011 with a brace against Al-Naft. He was the club's top scorer and top assist-maker in their league title win in 2013. He also scored Al-Shorta's first two goals in the AFC Cup in 2014, and is the club's joint-sixth highest league scorer in history.

== Club career ==
=== Al-Kut (2005–2007) ===
The forward is the youngest of three footballing brothers, Mohammed and Alaa, the sons of former army track and field athlete Kalaf Mansour. Born and brought up in the city of Kut, Kalaf signed for the team as a youth player.

Kalaf broke into the first team in the 2004–05 season under coach Nassir Maribi. On 14 January 2005, at 13 years of age, he made his debut in a 2004–05 Iraqi Premier League match against Al-Basra, becoming the youngest player ever to play a match in the Iraqi Premier League at that time (this record was broken by Mohanad Ali in 2014). That season, Al-Kut surprised everyone by finishing second in their group in the first stage with 8 wins, 2 draws and 4 losses, qualifying to the elite stage, where they lost all 4 matches. This was an historic achievement for Al-Kut.

Unlike the previous season, Al-Kut were not very successful in the 2005–06 Iraqi Premier League. They won just 1 match, drawing 3 and losing 8, finishing bottom of their group and being relegated to the Iraqi First Division League. Kalaf played a few games including 50 minutes of a match against Misan on 25 November 2005, 22 minutes of a match against Naft Al-Junoob on 27 January 2006 and the first 60 minutes of a match against Karbalaa on 3 March 2006. Kalaf was also part of the Iraq U-17 squad and was selected by coach Kadhim Khalaf for the 2006 AFC U-17 Championship.

In the 2006–07 season, Al-Kut played in the Iraqi First Division League and failed to earn promotion back to the top division. Kalaf played a friendly for the Iraq U-17 team against his own club Al-Kut on 11 November 2006 and the match finished 0–0. In this season he caught the eye of one of the biggest clubs in Iraq: Al-Shorta.

=== Al-Shorta (2007–2010) ===
Al-Shorta signed Kalaf from Al-Kut in 2007 on a two-year contract, ahead of the start of the 2007–08 Iraqi Premier League. At just 16 years old, Kalaf made his Al-Shorta debut in the first match of the 2007–08 season against Al-Shualah. He started the match on the bench, and within minutes of coming on as a substitute, Kalaf scored an overhead kick to put Al-Shorta 3–0 ahead in the 46th minute. He scored his second goal for the club in the very next match, the Baghdad derby between Al-Shorta and Al-Zawraa to help Al-Shorta to a 2–1 win. He received the first red card of his Al-Shorta career when he was sent off in a 3–1 defeat to Al-Zawraa, a game where he played as a right-back and assisted a goal. In total, Kalaf scored four goals in his debut season, and he extended his contract at the club after the end of the league campaign.

In the 2008–09 season, Kalaf was Al-Shorta's top scorer for the season for the first time, scoring six goals, and he scored a further five in the following campaign. This caught the eye of Iraq manager Radhi Shenaishil who gave him his international debut in 2009.

=== Erbil (2010) ===
On 18 September 2010, Erbil announced the signing of Amjad Kalaf from Al-Shorta, alongside the signings of Ous Ibrahim (also from Al-Shorta), Ali Mansoor (from Baghdad), Mohammed Gassid and Mustafa Ahmed (both from Al-Zawraa). Four days later, the Iraq Football Association approved of the contract at their headquarters.

However, Kalaf said he felt homesick outside of Baghdad and that he had stayed in contact with many Al-Shorta fans while in Erbil. Before Erbil entered their pre-season training camp, Kalaf called Al-Shorta manager Younis Abed Ali and asked him to return to the club. He then had a long conversation with Abdul Khaliq Masood, the vice president of Erbil, asking for his contract to be terminated. Masood refused at first but eventually accepted Kalaf's request. In November, two months after signing for Erbil, Kalaf's contract was terminated. Former club Al-Shorta and fellow Baghdad club Al-Naft both made offers to Kalaf, and Kalaf decided to rejoin Al-Shorta ahead of the start of the 2010–11 Iraqi Premier League.

=== Al-Shorta (2010–2016) ===
Kalaf scored goals in four consecutive matches between round 2 to round 5 of the 2010–11 Iraqi Premier League. On 5 February, Kalaf scored the winning goal against defending champions Duhok, and four days later he scored a brace in a 3–1 win over eventual runners-up of the league, Erbil. Kalaf suffered a serious injury which kept him out for months, and in his absence Al-Shorta's results plummeted as they went on a run of 1 win in 12 matches. This led to Al-Shorta finding themselves in a battle to avoid being relegated to the Iraqi First Division League for the first time in their history. Kalaf was substituted on in the second half against Samarra on 1 July and scored within a few minutes to put Al-Shorta 1–0 up in a match they eventually won 3–1. In the final match of the season against Al-Naft, Al-Shorta needed a victory to avoid relegation. Al-Shorta won the match 2–0 with Kalaf scoring both of Al-Shorta's goals in the game to save them from the drop. For the second time in his career, Kalaf was Al-Shorta's top scorer for the season with 11 goals, despite being injured for a large period of it.

In Al-Shorta's first match of the 2011–12 season, a 0–0 draw against Al-Sinaah, Kalaf wore the captain's armband because the club's captain Ali Hussein Jalil and the vice-captain Fareed Majeed were both not playing. Therefore, Kalaf set a new record for the youngest player ever to captain Al-Shorta in a match at just 20 years old (this record was broken by Dhurgham Ismail in 2012). Kalaf was Al-Shorta's top scorer for the second season in a row, again with 11 goals, with his team finishing seventh in the league table. Al-Zawraa manager Radhi Shenaishil and Al-Shorta manager Mohammed Tabra both voted for Kalaf in their Team of the Season selections, but Kalaf did not make the final team chosen by Al-Batal magazine.

Kalaf was linked with a move to close rivals Al-Zawraa in the summer transfer window of 2012 but he ended up staying at Al-Shorta due to his love for the club and its fans. On 16 June 2013, Kalaf featured in the 2013 Baghdad Cup final against Al-Zawraa and started the move which led to the cup-winning goal scored by Hussein Karim. This was Al-Shorta's first trophy in eleven years. In the final match of the league season, where Al-Shorta faced rivals Al-Talaba with a chance to clinch the league title, Nashat Akram gave Kalaf the captain's armband as a sign of respect for his great services to the club. Al-Shorta won the match 3–0 with two assists from Kalaf to become the Iraqi Premier League champions for the first time in 15 years. As captain on the day, Kalaf was the first player to lift the trophy on the podium. Kalaf scored 9 goals for Al-Shorta that season, being the club's top scorer for the third consecutive season, and was also the club's top assist-provider with 10 assists.

On 12 March 2014, Kalaf made history by scoring Al-Shorta's first two goals in a 3–1 win over Al-Wahda in the 2014 AFC Cup group stage; these were Al-Shorta's first two goals ever in the AFC Cup. Kalaf ended the 2013–14 season as Al-Shorta's second-highest league top scorer with four goals, behind Mustafa Karim. Al-Shorta topped the Iraqi Premier League standings for the second season in a row with a record of 12 wins, 7 draws and 2 losses, however the season was ended prematurely due to the war situation in the country.

After the departure of Nashat Akram from the club, Kalaf was named as Al-Shorta's permanent captain. Kalaf was injured for a large part of the 2014–15 campaign, scoring two goals in the season. Both of the goals were in the 2015 AFC Cup group stage. The first was against Al-Hidd in a 2–2 draw and the second was against Taraji Wadi Al-Nes in a 6–2 victory.

Kalaf's 2015–16 season was interrupted by injuries again. He scored an important goal in a 2–1 win over Al-Hedood which saw Al-Shorta qualify for the elite stage on the final day of the group stage. In the first match of the elite stage (the derby against Al-Talaba), Kalaf was substituted onto the field in the second half after just recovering from an injury, and he scored on 86 minutes to win the match 1–0 for his side. Kalaf was Al-Shorta's second-highest top scorer this season with four goals, one behind Ali Faez.

Kalaf scored his first goal of the 2016–17 season against Al-Bahri in a 2–1 win. He then bagged two goals in a 4–0 win over Al-Karkh at the end of October, and scored his fourth of the season with the only goal in a 1–0 win over Al-Kahrabaa in round 10. After a 2–0 loss to Karbalaa, Mohamed Youssef decided to terminate Kalaf's contract at the club in a controversial and highly-publicised decision. Kalaf was the club's top scorer for the season at the time. Kalaf turned up for Al-Shorta's next home game despite his release in order to cheer on his former teammates from the stands.

=== Al-Zawraa (2017–2018) ===
On 11 January 2017, Kalaf signed a contract with Al-Zawraa, fierce rivals of his former club Al-Shorta. Kalaf supported Al-Zawraa as a youngster and had previously expressed his admiration for the club.

He made his debut on 14 January against Al-Hedood in an Iraqi Premier League match as a second-half substitute in a match Al-Zawraa won 1–0. He scored his first goal in the following game against Zakho with a header in a match that ended in a 4–1 win for the Baghdad club, and later scored a last-minute winner against Al-Talaba in the Baghdad derby. His first season ended with a fourth place finish in the league and victory in the Iraq FA Cup Final, which was followed by winning the Iraqi Super Cup title. In the following season, Kalaf scored a late equalising goal against his former club Al-Shorta in the Baghdad derby and helped Al-Zawraa to win the 2017–18 Iraqi Premier League title. In total, Kalaf scored eight goals during his time with Al-Zawraa (six in the league, one in the FA Cup and one in the AFC Cup).

=== Al-Talaba (2018–2019) ===
Kalaf joined Al-Talaba in the 2018–19 season. He scored his first goal on 3 December with a last-minute equaliser against Naft Al-Wasat in the league, and later scored against Al-Karkh in the FA Cup and against Naft Al-Junoob in the league. Kalaf left the club in November 2019 citing unpaid wages.

== International career ==
Kalaf's first international participation was for the Iraq U-17 team in 2005, when he was called up by coach Kadhim Khalaf for the qualifiers for the 2006 AFC U-17 Championship. Kalaf scored his first goal against China in the 2006 Tehran International Championship. Kalaf played a part in all three of Iraq's games at the 2006 AFC U-17 Championship, where Iraq were knocked out in the group stage with 2 draws and 1 loss. Also in 2006, Kalaf scored against Lebanon in the qualifiers for the Arab Junior Cup.

In 2008, Kalaf was called up for the Iraq school football team for the Pan Arab School Games in Jordan, and Kalaf scored two goals against Kuwait in the group stage, with Iraq eventually finishing fourth in the tournament. Qatar offered Kalaf a path to naturalisation after his impressive performance for the Iraq school team, but Kalaf refused.

Kalaf made his debut for the senior Iraq national team at the age of just 18 years old when Radhi Shenaishil called him up for a friendly with Saudi Arabia on 22 March 2009. Kalaf did not start the match but was subbed on for Halgurd Mulla Mohammed. 6 days later he made his second appearance, against South Korea, being subbed on for Herdi Nuraddin.

Kalaf scored the opening goal in a 2–0 win over Oman in 2010 AFC U-19 Championship qualification; Kalaf received a red card in the same match. On 16 January 2012, Kalaf played for the Iraq U-23 team in a match against FC Anzhi Makhachkala, with the likes of Samuel Eto'o and Roberto Carlos featuring for the Russian side. Iraq lost 1–0, but after the game Anzhi showed interest in Kalaf and got into contact with the player in an attempt to sign him, however the move never materialised and Kalaf remained at Al-Shorta. Kalaf participated in the 2012 Matchworld Cup for the U-23 team which started two days after the match with Anzhi. Iraq played three matches in the tournament, winning one and losing two, finishing 6th out of 8 teams.

Kalaf was called up for the Iraq senior team's 2012 WAFF Championship squad. He did not play the opening match, but was subbed onto the field on 52 minutes in the second match against Syria. He was subbed onto the field on 77 minutes in the semi-final, a 2–0 win over Oman, and was subbed on in the 74th minute of the final, but Iraq lost 1–0 to Syria and finished as the runners-up. Kalaf participated in the 2013 Islamic Solidarity Games for the Olympic team, scoring the first goal in Iraq's opening match, a 3–2 defeat to Turkey. Iraq drew their next game 0–0 against Syria, before drawing their final match 2–2 against Saudi Arabia, with Kalaf scoring Iraq's second goal in that match.

In the 2013 WAFF Championship, Kalaf played the full 90 minutes in both of Iraq's matches, but both games finished 0–0 and Iraq were knocked out in the group stage. Kalaf's first trophy on the international stage was the 2013 AFC U-22 Championship, which was actually played in January 2014. In the opening match against Saudi Arabia, Kalaf assisted two goals, both scored by Marwan Hussein, as Iraq won 3–1. In the second match, Kalaf assisted another goal for Hussein as Iraq beat Uzbekistan 2–1. Kalaf did not feature in the final group match against China. In the quarter-finals, Iraq played Japan. With the scores locked at 0–0 with six minutes left of the match, Kalaf went on a bursting run and rounded the keeper to score the winning goal and put Iraq into the semi-finals where they defeated South Korea 1–0. In the final, Iraq beat Saudi Arabia 1–0 to become the champions. Kalaf was awarded the MVP (Most Valuable Player) award for the tournament.

In the 2014 Asian Games tournament, Kalaf was one of Iraq's key players. He assisted a goal for Younis Mahmoud in the opening match, a 4–0 win against Nepal, before Iraq beat Japan 3–1 and Kuwait 3–0 to reach the knockout stage. In the round of 16, Iraq beat Tajikistan 4–2, with Kalaf assisting the opening goal with a cross converted by Humam Tariq. Iraq defeated Saudi Arabia 3–0 in the quarter-finals, but lost 1–0 to North Korea in the semi-finals after extra time. They beat Thailand 1–0 in the third place playoff to earn a bronze medal.

Kalaf was called up for Iraq senior team's 22nd Arabian Gulf Cup squad in 2014. He was on the bench for all three matches, but was subbed onto the field in the second half of all three games. Iraq ended with 1 draw and 2 losses and were knocked out at the group stage. After this disappointing tournament, Radhi Shenaishil was reappointed as Iraq manager and he called up Kalaf for his 2015 AFC Asian Cup squad. Shenaishil showed faith in Kalaf, and Kalaf started all three group matches, being subbed off late on in the last two. Iraq beat Jordan 1–0 and Palestine 2–0 and lost 1–0 against Japan to qualify for the quarter-finals. In the quarter-finals, Iraq drew 3–3 with Iran after extra-time and won 7–6 on penalties to qualify to the semi-finals. Kalaf was on the bench but was substituted onto the field in the 107th minute. He did not take a penalty in the shootout. Kalaf played all 90 minutes of the semi-final which Iraq lost 2–0 against South Korea. In the third place playoff against United Arab Emirates, Kalaf provided an assist for Iraq's first goal and then scored his first senior international goal to put Iraq 2–1 up, but Iraq ended up losing 3–2 to finish fourth. Kalaf was subbed off on 86 minutes in this match. Kalaf returned to the national team in 2017 when he was called up by Radhi Shenaishil for the FIFA World Cup qualifiers.

== Style of play ==
Kalaf's main attribute is his blistering pace. Described as "a gazelle on the wings", Kalaf (being the son of a former sprinter) has often made bursting, defence splitting runs down the right flank. He is also praised for his heading ability as he has scored many goals for Al-Shorta using his head, and his clinical finishing has allowed him to score more than a half-century of goals for his club. When played on the wing, he is capable of creating goals by putting in low or high crosses into the penalty area, as demonstrated by the fact that all of his assists in the 2013 AFC U-22 Championship and 2014 Asian Games tournaments were from crosses.

== Career statistics ==
=== International ===
International goals
#	Date	Venue	Opponent	Score	Result	Competition
1	30 January 2015	Newcastle Stadium, Newcastle	United Arab Emirates	2–1	2–3	2015 AFC Asian Cup

== Honours ==
Al-Shorta

- Iraqi Premier League: 2012–13

Al-Zawraa

- Iraqi Premier League: 2017–18
- Iraq FA Cup: 2016–17
- Iraqi Super Cup: 2017

Iraq U-23

- AFC U-22 Championship: 2013
- Asian Games Bronze medal: 2014

Iraq

- WAFF Championship runner-up: 2012
- AFC Asian Cup fourth place: 2015

Individual

- AFC U-22 Championship Most Valuable Player: 2013
