= Ahmed Ayad =

Iraqi footballer

Personal information
- Full name: Ahmed Ayad Anwar
- Date of birth: January 1, 1986 (age 40)
- Place of birth: Baghdad, Iraq
- Positions: Winger; wingback

Team information
- Current team: Al-Ramadi

Youth career
- Al-Karkh

Senior career*
Years	Team	Apps	(Gls)
2005–2011	Al-Quwa Al-Jawiya		
2011–2012	Erbil		
2012–2015	Al-Shorta		
2015	Al-Quwa Al-Jawiya		
2015–2018	Al-Shorta		
2018	→ Al-Quwa Al-Jawiya (loan)		
2019–2020	Al-Talaba		
2020–2021	Zakho		
2022	Samarra		
2022–	Al-Ramadi		

International career^{‡}
2009–2010	Iraq	14	(0)
- * Club domestic league appearances and goals as of N/A ‡ National team caps and goals as of 28 December 2010

Ahmed Ayad Anwar (Arabic: أَحْمَد إِيَاد أَنْوَر; born 1 January 1986 in Baghdad, Iraq) nicknamed (Iraqi Messi) is an Iraqi footballer who has represented the Iraq national football team. He plays as winger and wingback. He played with Al-Quwa Al-Jawiya in the Asian Champions League and the Arab Champions League.

== Honors ==
=== Clubs ===
Al-Quwa Al-Jawiya

- Iraqi Premier League: 2004–05

Erbil

- Iraqi Premier League: 2011–12

Al-Shorta

- Iraqi Premier League: 2012–13
