= Jean Michel N'Lend =

Cameroonian footballer

Personal information
- Date of birth: May 8, 1986 (age 40)
- Place of birth: Yaoundé, Cameroon
- Height: 1.90 m (6 ft 3 in)
- Position: Striker

Team information
- Current team: Bamboutos
- Number: 23

Youth career
- –2004: FC Sable de Batié
- 2004–2006: Fovu Baham

Senior career*
Years	Team	Apps	(Gls)
2006–2007	FUS Rabat	11	(7)
2007–2008	Oran	23	(14)
2008–2009	DAC Dunajská Streda	25	(6)
2010	Shanghai Shenhua	19	(5)
2011	Liaoning Whowin	10	(0)
2012–2013	Al Shorta	23	(6)
2015	Al Faisaly	–	(3)
2015–2018	Bamboutos	–	(–)
2018–2019	Arhavispor	–	(–)

International career
	Cameroon	1	(0)
- * Club domestic league appearances and goals as of 1 June 2020

Jean Michel N'Lend (born May 8, 1986) is a Cameroonian footballer.

== Club career ==
=== Al-Shorta ===
Jean Michel N'Lend was the third foreign player to join Al Shorta in its history following the signings of fellow Cameroonian Innocent Awoa and Ivorian defender Sékou Tidiane Souaré. He made an instant impression at Al Shorta, scoring in friendly matches against Al Naft and Naft Al Junoob. His first league goals came against Al Shorta's fierce rivals Al Quwa Al Jawiya at the Al Shaab Stadium, where he scored a hat-trick of headers to seal a 4–1 victory. This was when N'Lend became a fan favourite and wrote his name into the history books, becoming the first-ever non-Iraqi to score a hat-trick in the Iraqi Premier League. He then went on to score again at the Al Shaab Stadium against Al Naft in a 2–2 draw, followed by the winning goal against Naft Al Junoob in a 2–1 win. He continued his impressive record of scoring in every game he played at Al Shaab Stadium with the winning goal in a 2–1 victory over fierce rivals Al Zawraa, however that record ended five days later in a 1–1 draw with Al Talaba, a game in which he missed an open goal. He eventually left the club in May 2013 after a dip in form; Al Shorta's vice-president Adnan Jafar stated that the club had several players that were capable of filling in his position.
