= Ahmad Fadhel =

Iraqi footballer

Personal information
- Full name: Ahmed Fadhel Mohammed Al-Nuaimi
- Date of birth: 1 January 1992 (age 34)
- Place of birth: Baghdad, Iraq
- Height: 1.77 m (5 ft 10 in)
- Position: Midfielder

Team information
- Current team: Naft Al-Basra

Senior career*
| Years | Team | Apps | (Gls) |
| 2008–2016 | Al-Shorta | | (6) |
| 2014–2015 | → Baghdad (loan) | | |
| 2016–2022 | Al-Zawraa | 25 | (2) |
| 2022–2023 | Al-Najaf FC | | |
| 2023– | Naft Al-Basra | | |

International career^{‡}
| 2009–2010 | Iraq U20 | 8 | (1) |
| 2011–2012 | Iraq U23 | 1 | (0) |
| 2013– | Iraq | 5 | (0) |
- * Club domestic league appearances and goals ‡ National team caps and goals as of 11 November 2021

Ahmad Fadhel Mohammed Al-Nuaimi (Arabic: أَحْمَد فَاضِل مُحَمَّد النَّعِيمِيّ, born 1 January 1992), is an Iraqi footballer who last played as a midfielder for Al-Zawraa in Iraqi Premier League.

== International debut ==
On 26 March 2013 Fadhel made his full international debut against Syria in a friendly match in Al-Shaab Stadium, in Baghdad. The match was ended 2-1 victory for Iraq.

== Honors ==
=== Clubs ===
Al-Shorta

- Iraqi Premier League: 2012–13

Al-Zawraa

- Iraqi Premier League: 2017–18
- Iraq FA Cup: 2016–17, 2018–19
- Iraqi Super Cup: 2017, 2021
