= Mubarak Wajdi =

Saudi Arabian footballer

Personal information
- Full name: Mubarak Wajdi Al-Dossari
- Date of birth: August 22, 1991 (age 35)
- Place of birth: Saudi Arabia
- Height: 1.70 m (5 ft 7 in)
- Position: Defender

Senior career*
Years	Team	Apps	(Gls)
2011–2017	Al-Ettifaq	53	(0)
2017–2019	Al-Nahda		
2019–2021	Al-Kawkab		
2022–2023	Arar		
2023–2024	Hajer		
- * Club domestic league appearances and goals

Mubarak Wajdi (Arabic: مبارك وجدي; born 22 August 1991) is a Saudi football player who currently plays as a defender.

On 5 July 2023, Wajdi joined Hajer.
