= Minusu Buba =

Nigerian football Striker

Personal information
- Date of birth: 8 September 1985 (age 41)
- Place of birth: Nigeria
- Height: 1.87 m (6 ft 2 in)
- Position: Striker

Team information
- Current team: Al-Sinaa

Senior career*
Years	Team	Apps	(Gls)
2002–2003	El-Kanemi Warriors		
2003–2005	Coton Sport		
2005–2006	Asmant Assiut	9	(6)
2006–2008	Al-Mokawloon Al-Arab	27	(11)
2008–2009	ENPPI	11	(3)
2009–2011	Ittihad El-Shorta	68	(22)
2011–2014	El-Gouna	30	(9)
2012–2013	→ Al-Shorta (loan)	20	(8)
2014–2015	Al-Masry	2	(1)
2015–2017	El-Dakhleya	40	(5)
2017–2018	Tanta	2	(0)
2019–	Al-Sinaa		
- * Club domestic league appearances and goals as of 11 March 2019

Minusu Buba (born September 8, 1985) is a Nigerian football striker who plays for Iraqi First Division League club Al-Sinaa.

== Career ==
Minusu scored 6 goals for Asmant Assiut in the 2005–06 Egyptian Premier League season.

Buba joined Ittihad El-Shorta (a.k.a. Police Union) in January 2009 from ENPPI. He enjoyed an extremely successful season with his new team in 2009–10. Buba scored 14 league goals that season and was crowned the league top scorer.

== Honors ==
=== Clubs ===
Al-Shorta

- Iraqi Premier League: 2012–13

=== Individual ===
- Egyptian Premier League Top Scorer: 2009–10
