= Masafi Al-Wasat SC =

Iraqi football club

Masafi Al-Wasat
- Full name: Masafi Al-Wasat Sports Club
- Founded: 2004; 22 years ago
- Ground: Al-Masafi Stadium
- Capacity: 5,000
- Chairman: Mohammed Dahlooz
- Manager: Mahdi Kadhim
- League: Iraqi Premier Division League
- 2025–26: Iraqi Premier Division League, 12th of 20
| Home colours | Away colours |

Masafi Al-Wasat Sports Club (Arabic: نادي مصافي الوسط الرياضي), also known as Al-Masafi Sports Club, is a football team based in Baghdad, that plays in Iraqi Premier Division League.

== History ==
=== in Premier League ===
Masafi Al-Wasat played in the Iraqi Premier League for the first time in the 2009–10 season, this was after it won the Baghdad group in the Iraqi First Division League, in 2008–09 season The team played six seasons in Premier League, where in the first two seasons it was so good that it topped its group in the first matches, but in the next two seasons it was not good enough as it was close to relegation. In the last two seasons the team was very bad, at the end of its fifth season it was In the last place in the standings, but was saved by the Football Association's decision when it decided that no team would be relegated that season. In the team's sixth season in the Premier League, the 2014–15 season, the team finished last in the standings at the end of the season, after poor results and attempts to avoid relegation and a change of coach, but the team did not improve, and was finally relegated to the Iraqi First Division League.

== Managerial history ==
- (Iraq) Nazar Ashraf
- (Iraq) Hamza Dawood
- (Iraq) Nadhim Shaker
- (Iraq) Hassan Ahmed
- (Iraq) Yahya Alwan
- (Iraq) Humam Saleh
- (Iraq) Adel Nima
- (Iraq) Ali Majeed
- (Iraq) Ahmed Daham
- (Iraq) Mus'ab Abbas
- (Iraq) Mahdi Kadhim

== Famous players ==
- (Iraq) Ali Qasim Mshari
- (Iraq) Mohammed Ali Karim
- (Iraq) Muslim Mubarak
- (Iraq) Ous Ibrahim
- (Lebanon) Zakaria Charara
- (Nigeria) Raheem Owolabi Isiaka
- (Syria) Aatef Jenyat
- (Syria) Bakri Tarab
- (Syria) Feras Esmaeel
