= Muslim Mubarak =

Iraqi footballer

Personal information
- Full name: Muslim Mubarak Almas
- Date of birth: June 13, 1985 (age 41)
- Place of birth: Basra, Iraq
- Positions: Striker; attacking midfielder

Team information
- Current team: Al-Difaa Al-Madani

Youth career
- Al-Minaa

Senior career*
Years	Team	Apps	(Gls)
2001–2004	Al-Minaa		
2004–2007	Al-Zawraa		
2007–2009	Arbil FC		(6)
2009	Rah Ahan	3	(0)
2010–2012	Arbil FC		
2012–2013	Al Shorta		(7)
2013–2014	Al Talaba		
2014–2015	Masafi Al-Wasat		
2015–2017	Naft Al-Janoob		
2018–2020	Al-Difaa Al-Madani		

International career^{‡}
2004	Iraq U20	5	(3)
2009	Iraq	2	(0)
- * Club domestic league appearances and goals ‡ National team caps and goals as of March 28, 2009

Muslim Mubarak Almas (Arabic: مسلم مبارك الماس; born 13 June 1985 in Basra, Iraq) is an Iraqi footballer currently playing for Baghdad club Al-Difaa Al-Madani. He was part of Iraq B team in the 2007 King's Cup.

== Career ==
Has won the league title at three clubs, in 2006 with Al-Zawraa in which he dispatched the winning penalty, with Arbil FC in 2008 and with Al Shorta in 2013.

== Honors ==
=== Clubs ===
Al-Zawraa

- Iraqi Premier League: 2005–06

Erbil

- Iraqi Premier League: 2007–08, 2008–09, 2011–12

Al-Shorta

- Iraqi Premier League: 2012–13
