= Mustafa Jawda =

Iraqi footballer

Personal information
- Full name: Mustafa Jawda
- Date of birth: 1 July 1992 (age 34)
- Place of birth: Iraq
- Position: Striker

Team information
- Current team: Al-Zawraa

Senior career*
Years	Team	Apps	(Gls)
2008–2009	Al-Shorta		(2)
2009–2010	Karbalaa		(3)
2010–2011	Al-Shorta		(0)
2011–2013	Al-Kahraba		(20)
2013–2017	Al-Naft		(4)
2017–2020	Al-Zawraa		

International career^{‡}
2009–2010	Iraq	5	(2)
2014	Iraq	1	(0)
- * Club domestic league appearances and goals as of 12 October 2014 ‡ National team caps and goals as of 12 October 2014

Mustafa Jawda (Arabic: مُصْطَفَى جَوْدَة; born 1 July 1992) is an Iraqi footballer who plays as a striker for Al-Zawraa.

== Honours ==
=== Club ===
Al-Zawraa

- Iraqi Premier League: 2017–18
- Iraqi Super Cup: 2017
