= Innocent Awoa =

Cameroonian footballer

Felix Awoa
Personal information
- Full name: Innocent Felix Awoa Zoa
- Date of birth: June 26, 1988 (age 38)
- Place of birth: Yaoundé, Cameroon
- Height: 1.78 m (5 ft 10 in)
- Position: Right back

Team information
- Current team: CS Chênois

Senior career*
Years	Team	Apps	(Gls)
2007	C.A. Valdevez	0	(0)
2007–2008	U.D. Rio Maior	12	(1)
2008–2010	Dinamo București	0	(0)
2008–2009	→ Dinamo București II (loan)	12	(0)
2010–2011	Al-Ittihad	20	(0)
2011–2012	El Gouna	11	(0)
2012–2015	Al Shorta		(1)
2016–2017	FC Challans	10	(0)
2018–2019	CS Chênois	17	(0)
- * Club domestic league appearances and goals

Innocent Félix Awoa Zoa (born June 26, 1988) is a Cameroonian footballer currently playing for CS Chênois. He is a defender.

== Honors ==
Al-Shorta

- Iraqi Premier League: 2012–13
