= Mohammed Ali Karim =

Iraqi football defender (born 1986)

Personal information
- Full name: Mohammed Ali Karim
- Date of birth: 25 June 1986 (age 40)
- Place of birth: Iraq
- Height: 1.70 m (5 ft 7 in)
- Position: Right-back

Team information
- Current team: Iraq U16 (Assist. Manager)

Senior career*
Years	Team	Apps	(Gls)
2002–2007	Al-Shorta		
2007–2008	Al-Jazeera Club Amman		(0)
2008	Al-Shorta		
2008–2009	Al-Quwa Al-Jawiya		
2009	Al-Jazira Club		
2009–2010	Mes Kerman	11	(0)
2010	Al-Zawraa		
2010–2011	Al-Shorta	11	(0)
2011	Erbil		
2011–2012	Al-Zawraa		
2012–2014	Al-Talaba		
2014–2018	Al-Quwa Al-Jawiya		

International career^{‡}
2007–2011	Iraq	25	(0)

Managerial career
- 2019–: Iraq U16 (Assist. Manager)
- * Club domestic league appearances and goals as of 12 November 2009 ‡ National team caps and goals as of 2 January 2011

Mohammed Ali Karim (Arabic: مُحَمَّد عَلِيّ كَرِيم) (born 25 June 1986 in Iraq) is an Iraqi football defender. As of 2019 he was coaching the Iraq U16 as assistant.

== Club career ==
Born in June 1986, he started his playing career as a teenager in 2002 with Bagdad-based Al Shorta. In 2007 he was signed by Jordanian side Al Jazeera Amman, where he spent a season before returning to his homeland for short stints with Al Shorta again and Al-Quwa Al-Jawiya, before joining Abu Dhabi-based Al Jazira. He then moved to Al Zawraa and in October 2010 he moved back to Al Shorta, where he was given the number 2 shirt, after Samal Saeed left Al Shorta. In March 2011 Mohammed Ali Karim signed on a contract with Arbil SC. Shortly after Mohammed signed with Al-Zawra'a SC before signing for Talaba SC in 2012

== International career ==
Kareem broke into Iraq's Olympic side (U23) and played a key defensive role in the silver-winning campaign at the 2006 Asian Games at Doha. Karim earned his first senior call-up in 2008 under Adnan Hamad and featured in three of the Iraqis' six qualifying games in Asia's third stage of qualifying for the 2010 FIFA World Cup South Africa, including the 1–0 victory over Australia.

== Honours ==
=== Country ===
- 2006 Asian Games Silver medallist.

=== Club ===
Erbil

- Iraqi Premier League: 2011–12

Al-Quwa Al-Jawiya

- Iraq FA Cup: 2015–16
