= Fareed Majeed =

Iraqi footballer

Personal information
- Full name: Fareed Majeed Ghadban
- Date of birth: 10 April 1986 (age 40)
- Place of birth: Iraq
- Height: 1.85 m (6 ft 1 in)
- Positions: Defensive midfielder; centre-back

Team information
- Current team: Al-Minaa SC (trainer)

Senior career*
Years	Team	Apps	(Gls)
2002–2003	Al-Talaba		
2003–2007	Al-Quwa Al-Jawiya		
2007–2008	Najaf FC		
2008–2010	Al-Talaba		
2010–2011	Naft Tehran F.C.	2	(0)
2011–2013	Al-Shorta		(2)
2014–2017	Al-Karkh		

International career
2009-2012	Iraq	23	(0)

Managerial career
- Al-Talaba (Assist.)
- 2021: Al-Talaba (Caretaker)
- 2021–: Al-Kahrabaa FC (Assist.)
- 2022-23: Al-Minaa SC
- * Club domestic league appearances and goals

Fareed Majeed Ghadban (Arabic: فَرِيد مَجِيد غَضْبَان; born 10 April 1986 in Iraq) is a former Iraqi footballer who is currently trainer coach of Al-Minaa SC.

== Career ==
Majeed's physical energy has marked him out as a dependable stalwart on the domestic scene during stints with Iraqi clubs such as Al Talaba, Al Quwa Al Jawiya, Najaf FC and Al Shorta. Before earning his senior debut with the national team in 2007, he had played an active part with Iraq at age group levels, including winning the 2002 West Asia Football Federation (WAFF) Championship with Iraq's Olympic side. He played the 2004 AFC Champions League with Al Shorta, and captained Al Shorta in the 2013 Baghdad Cup Final which Al Shorta won 1–0.

== Managerial statistics ==
As of match played 7 January 2021

Managerial record by team and tenure
Team	From	To	Record					Ref.
Team	From	To	P	W	D	L	Win %	Ref.
Al-Talaba SC (caretaker)	1 January 2021	7 January 2021	1	0	0	1	0.0	
Total			1	0	0	1	0.0	—

== Honors ==
=== Clubs ===
Al-Quwa Al-Jawiya

- Iraqi Premier League: 2004–05

Al-Shorta

- Iraqi Premier League: 2012–13

As Manager

Al-Minaa

- Iraqi First Division League: 2022–23

=== Country ===
- 2005 West Asian Games Gold medallist.
- 2012 Arab Nations Cup Bronze medallist
