= Mohammed Gassid =

Iraqi footballer (born 1986)

Personal information
- Full name: Mohammed Gassid Kadhim Al-Jaberi
- Date of birth: 10 December 1986 (age 39)
- Place of birth: Baghdad, Iraq
- Height: 1.81 m (5 ft 11 in)
- Position: Goalkeeper

Senior career*
Years	Team	Apps	(Gls)
2003–2004	Al-Karkh		
2004–2005	Al-Naft		
2005–2008	Al-Shorta	36	(0)
2008–2010	Al-Zawraa	27	(0)
2010–2011	Erbil		
2011–2012	Al-Talaba		
2012–2015	Al-Shorta		
2015–2017	Al-Zawraa		
2017–2018	Al-Naft		
2018–2020	Al-Quwa Al-Jawiya		
2020–2023	Al-Najaf		

International career^{‡}
2006–2008	Iraq U23	16	(0)
2007–2018	Iraq	69	(0)
Medal record
Men's football
Representing Iraq
AFC Asian Cup
Winner	2007 Indonesia/Malaysia/ Thailand/Vietnam
- * Club domestic league appearances and goals as of 24 August 2016 ‡ National team caps and goals as of 24 August 2021

Mohammed Gassid Kadhim Al-Jaberi (Arabic: مُحَمَّد قَاصِد كَاظِم الْجَابِرِيّ; born 10 December 1986) is an Iraqi former professional footballer who played as a goalkeeper for the Iraq national team.

== Honours ==
Al-Shorta

- Iraqi Premier League: 2012–13

Al-Zawraa

- Iraqi Premier League: 2015–16

Al-Quwa Al-Jawiya

- AFC Cup: 2018

Iraq

- AFC Asian Cup: 2007
- Asian Games silver medalist: 2006
- WAFF Championship runner-up: 2012
- Arab Cup third place: 2012
