= 2012–13 Iraqi Elite League =

Iraqi Elite League
- Season: 2012–13
- Dates: 19 October 2012 – 4 September 2013
- Champions: Al-Shorta (3rd title)
- Relegated: Al-Kahrabaa; Sulaymaniya; Al-Sinaa; Kirkuk
- AFC Champions League: Al-Shorta
- AFC Cup: Erbil
- Matches: 305
- Goals: 776 (2.54 per match)
- Top goalscorer: Amjad Radhi (25 goals)
- Biggest home win: Al-Zawraa 7–0 Kirkuk (29 April 2013); Erbil 8–1 Al-Minaa (27 June 2013)
- Biggest away win: Al-Sinaa 0–6 Al-Minaa (12 April 2013)
- Highest scoring: Erbil 8–1 Al-Minaa (27 June 2013)
- Longest winning run: 6 games Zakho; Al-Quwa Al-Jawiya
- Longest unbeaten run: 20 games Al-Shorta
- Longest winless run: 14 games Kirkuk
- Longest losing run: 12 games Kirkuk

The 2012–13 Iraqi Elite League was the 39th season of the competition since its establishment in 1974. The season began on 19 October 2012 and finished on 4 September 2013. Al-Shorta were crowned champions for the third time, finishing on 72 points, two points ahead of nearest competitors Erbil.

Having only managed a seventh-place finish in the previous season, Al-Shorta's results improved significantly under the presidency of Ayad Bunyan and they were able to outperform favourites Erbil, Duhok, Al-Zawraa and Al-Quwa Al-Jawiya.

On the final day of the season, three teams were all still in the race for the title. Al-Shorta needed a win against Al-Talaba to secure the league, whilst Erbil had to defeat Al-Najaf and hope that Al-Shorta failed to win their game if they wanted to retain their title. Al-Quwa Al-Jawiya needed both Al-Shorta and Erbil to slip up and needed to defeat Masafi Al-Wasat by a large goal margin in order for them to go home with the trophy.

All three teams ended up winning their respective matches, making Al-Shorta the champions. It was the club's first league title since the 1997–98 season.

== SWAT incident ==
On 23 June 2013, after a match with Al-Quwa Al-Jawiya, seven football players of Karbala and their manager were beaten by the anti-terror police. They used sticks and batons against the eight men.

Five of them were in critical condition, and on June 30, Mohammed Abbas Al-Jabouri, the club's manager, died in hospital. Several teams refused to play their matches in round 25 as a result of the incident.

== League table ==
Pos	Team	Pld	W	D	L	GF	GA	GD	Pts	Qualification or relegation
1	Al-Shorta (C)	34	20	12	2	62	29	+33	72	Qualification for the AFC Champions League preliminary round 1
2	Erbil	34	21	7	6	68	34	+34	70	Qualification for the AFC Cup group stage
3	Al-Quwa Al-Jawiya	34	21	6	7	60	33	+27	69	
4	Al-Zawraa	34	18	11	5	61	29	+32	65	
5	Duhok	34	16	10	8	54	35	+19	58	
6	Baghdad	34	13	14	7	36	28	+8	53	
7	Zakho	34	14	10	10	48	41	+7	52	
8	Al-Minaa	34	15	7	12	54	48	+6	52	
9	Al-Naft	34	13	7	14	43	43	0	46	
10	Naft Al-Junoob	33	9	12	12	47	49	−2	39 (Note: Al-Kahrabaa and Naft Al-Junoob refused to play each other in round 25 after the hospitalisation of Karbala's coach Mohammed Abbas Al-Jabouri. On July 27, before round 30, the IFA decided not to deduct either team any points.)	
11	Al-Najaf	34	10	8	16	34	43	−9	38	
12	Karbala	34	9	10	15	40	49	−9	37	
13	Masafi Al-Wasat	34	10	7	17	27	39	−12	37	
14	Al-Talaba	34	9	8	17	35	47	−12	35	
15	Al-Kahrabaa (R)	33	9	7	17	30	49	−19	34	Relegation to the Iraqi First Division League
16	Sulaymaniya (R)	34	9	7	18	37	60	−23	34	Relegation to the Iraqi First Division League
17	Al-Sinaa (R)	34	4	13	17	23	46	−23	25	Relegation to the Iraqi First Division League
18	Kirkuk (R)	34	4	6	24	17	74	−57	18	Relegation to the Iraqi First Division League

Source: Soccerway
Rules for classification: 1) points; 2) goal difference; 3) number of goals scored.
(C) Champions; (R) Relegated

== Results ==
Home \ Away	KAH	MIN	NFT	NJF	QWJ	SHR	SIN	TLB	ZWR	BGD	DUH	ERB	KRB	KRK	MAS	NFJ	SUL	ZAK
Al-Kahrabaa		0–1	2–1	1–0	0–3	1–1	1–1	0–1	0–1	0–2	1–1	3–5	2–1	2–0	1–0	– (Note: Al-Talaba, Al-Quwa Al-Jawiya and Al-Najaf were awarded 3–0 wins in round 25 because their respective opponents Sulaymaniya, Kirkuk and Amanat Baghdad all withdrew following the hospitalisation of Karbala's manager Mohammed Abbas Al-Jabouri. Meanwhile, the Al-Kahrabaa–Naft Al-Junoob match from the same round was not held as both teams refused to play the game.)	1–0	1–2
Al-Minaa	1–0		1–0	3–1	1–3	2–1	1–1	0–0	0–1	2–1	1–2	2–3	4–4	3–0 (Note: The Al-Minaa–Kirkuk match was awarded as a 3–0 win to Al-Minaa, as Kirkuk did not turn up for the game.)	0–0	0–2	5–2	2–1
Al-Naft	1–2	2–1		4–1	2–2	1–2	3–1	1–2	1–2	2–4	0–0	1–2	1–0	3–2	4–2	2–1	0–2	1–1
Al-Najaf	1–3	1–1	1–0		3–1	1–1	1–0	3–1	1–1	0–0	2–1	0–1	1–1	1–0	1–0	1–0	4–2	1–1
Al-Quwa Al-Jawiya	3–1	1–3	0–0	1–0		4–0	1–0	2–1	3–3	1–0	2–1	3–0	1–0	3–0	2–0	2–0	2–0	1–0
Al-Shorta	0–0	4–1	2–2	2–0	4–1		3–0	1–1	1–1	1–1	4–3	1–1	3–2	1–0	5–0	2–1	4–0	2–0
Al-Sinaa	1–1	0–6	0–1	0–0	2–1	0–1		2–0	1–0	0–0	0–0	1–1	1–2	0–1	1–0	1–1	0–0	0–1
Al-Talaba	2–0	0–3	0–0	2–1	1–2	0–3	2–1		1–2	0–2	2–2	2–2	2–1	2–0	0–1	0–1	3–0	2–3
Al-Zawraa	1–0	0–0	4–0	1–0	1–2	1–2	3–0 (Note: The Al-Zawraa–Al-Sinaa match was awarded as a 3–0 win to Al-Zawraa, as Al-Sinaa refused to play the game in protest at the IFA reversing its punishment of Al-Zawraa fans and allowing them to attend the game.)	1–0		2–2	1–1	0–1	2–2	7–0	2–1	3–2	4–0	4–1
Baghdad	0–0	1–0	1–0	0–3	2–1	1–1	2–1	0–0	1–1		1–2	1–0	1–0	1–1	1–0	1–1	3–2	1–1
Duhok	1–0	1–0	0–1	3–2	1–0	1–1	1–1	1–0	1–3	2–0		1–2	2–1	4–0	2–1	4–2	4–0	2–2
Erbil	2–1	8–1	0–1	4–1	1–1	0–1	1–0	3–1	2–1	1–0	0–1		3–0 (Note: The Erbil–Karbala match was awarded as a 3–0 win to Erbil, as Karbala did not turn up for the game.)	6–0	3–0	0–1	4–1	2–1
Karbala	0–1	1–0	0–3	1–1	2–4	0–1	1–1	3–2	0–2	2–1	1–1	1–1		4–0	0–0	2–1	0–0	3–2
Kirkuk	1–1	1–1	0–0	1–0	0–3	0–1	2–1	2–1	1–1	0–0	0–4	1–2	0–1		0–1	1–2	1–2	0–1
Masafi Al-Wasat	2–0	0–1	1–2	1–0	0–0	2–3	2–2	1–1	0–1	0–1	1–0	1–1	0–1	3–0		1–0	2–1	2–1
Naft Al-Junoob	4–1	4–3	3–1	3–1	0–1	0–2	2–2	1–1	2–2	0–3	1–1	1–1	2–2	2–0	1–1		1–1	3–3
Sulaymaniya	3–1	0–1	0–2	1–0	1–1	1–1	2–0	2–1	0–2	1–1	1–3	2–3	2–1	6–2	0–1	1–0		0–1
Zakho	6–2	2–3	1–0	1–0	3–2	0–0	2–1	0–1	0–0	0–0	1–0	1–2	1–0	4–0	1–0	2–2	1–1	

Source: Soccerway
Legend: Blue = home team win; Yellow = draw; Red = away team win.

== Season statistics ==
=== Top scorers ===
Rank	Player	Club	Goals
1	(Iraq) Amjad Radhi	Erbil	25
2	(Iraq) Alaa Abdul-Zahra	Duhok	20
3	(Iraq) Mustafa Karim	Al-Quwa Al-Jawiya	18
4	(Iraq) Luay Salah	Erbil	15
5	(Iraq) Mustafa Jawda	Al-Kahrabaa	11
5	(Iraq) Haidar Sabah	Al-Zawraa	11

=== Hat-tricks ===
Player	For	Against	Result	Date
(Cameroon) Jean Michel N'Lend	Al-Shorta	Al-Quwa Al-Jawiya	4–1	18 November 2012
(Iraq) Nasser Tallaa^{4}	Al-Minaa	Sulaymaniya	5–2	27 January 2013
(Iraq) Amjad Radhi	Erbil	Kirkuk	6–0	28 January 2013
(Iraq) Amjad Radhi	Erbil	Al-Najaf	4–1	28 February 2013
(Iraq) Hassan Hamoud	Al-Minaa	Al-Sinaa	6–0	12 April 2013
(Iraq) Alaa Abdul-Zahra	Duhok	Kirkuk	4–0	19 April 2013
(Iraq) Emad Mohammed	Al-Zawraa	Kirkuk	7–0	29 April 2013
(Iraq) Mustafa Jawda	Al-Kahrabaa	Erbil	3–5	6 May 2013
(Iraq) Younis Shakor	Zakho	Al-Kahrabaa	6–2	4 September 2013
(Iraq) Firas Ismail	Zakho	Al-Kahrabaa	6–2	4 September 2013

Notes

^{4} Player scored 4 goals

== Media coverage ==
Iraqi Elite League Media Coverage
Country	Television Channel	Matches
Iraq	Al-Iraqiya Sports Channel	3 matches per round

== See also ==
- 2012–13 Iraqi First Division League
- 2012–13 Iraq FA Cup
- 2013 Baghdad Cup
