= 1953 Circuit du Lac =

Formula Two race

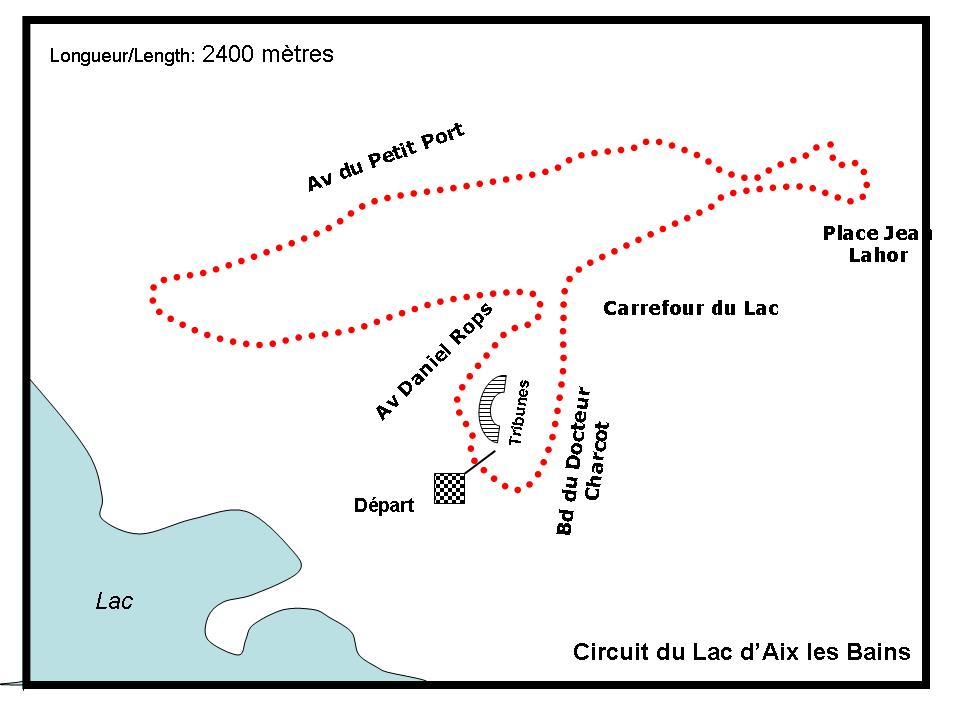

Race details
- Date: 26 July 1953
- Official name: V Circuit du Lac
- Location: Aix-les-Bains Circuit du Lac, Savoie, France
- Course: Temporary Street Circuit
- Course length: 2.409 km (1.497 mi)
- Distance: 2 x 50 laps, 240.94 km (149.71 mi)

Pole position
Driver	(United States) Harry Schell	Gordini
- Time: 1:20.0

Fastest lap
Driver	(France) Jean Behra	Gordini
- Time: 1:20.0

Podium
First	(France) Élie Bayol	O.S.C.A.
Second	(France) Louis Rosier	Ferrari
Third	(United Kingdom) Lance Macklin	HWM-Alta

The 5th Circuit du Lac was a Formula Two motor race held on 26 July 1953 at the Aix-les-Bains Circuit du Lac, France. The race was run over two heats each of 50 laps, with the winner being decided by aggregate time. The winner was Élie Bayol in an O.S.C.A. Tipo 20, finishing second and first in the two heats. Louis Rosier was second in a Ferrari 500 and Lance Macklin third in a HWM-Alta. Gordini driver Jean Behra won the first heat and set fastest overall lap during heat 2, and his teammate Harry Schell set pole position and fastest lap for heat 1, but both retired with mechanical problems.

== Classification ==
=== Race ===
Pos	No	Driver	Entrant	Car	Time/Retired	Grid^{1}	Heat 1	Heat 2
1	12	(France) Élie Bayol	Élie Bayol	O.S.C.A. Tipo 20	2:22:45.4, 101.27 kph	5	2	1
2	8	(France) Louis Rosier	Ecurie Rosier	Ferrari 500	+2:02.7	7	3	2
3	14	(United Kingdom) Lance Macklin	HW Motors Ltd	HWM-Alta	+4 laps	8	4	3
4	24	(United States) John Fitch	R.J. Chase	Cooper T23-Bristol	+7 laps	10	8	4
NC	18	(France) Yves Giraud-Cabantous	HW Motors Ltd	HWM-Alta	+12 laps	11	6	NC
Ret.	6	(United States) Harry Schell	Equipe Gordini	Gordini Type 16	71 laps	1	7	Ret., 21 laps, spark plugs
Ret.	4	(United States) Jean Behra	Equipe Gordini	Gordini Type 16	70 laps	6	1	Ret., 20 laps, rear axle
Ret.	16	(United Kingdom) Peter Collins	HW Motors Ltd	HWM-Alta	52 laps	9	5	Ret., 5 laps, clutch
Ret.	22	(Argentina) Onofre Marimón	Officine Alfieri Maserati	Maserati A6GCM	14 laps	2	Ret., 14 laps, crash	DNS
Ret.	2	(France) Maurice Trintignant	Equipe Gordini	Gordini Type 16	14 laps	3	Ret., 14 laps, fire	DNS
Ret.	20	(Switzerland) Emmanuel de Graffenried	Officine Alfieri Maserati	Maserati A6GCM	8 laps	4	Ret., 5 laps, oil pump	Ret., 3 laps, ignition
DNA	10	(France) Louis Chiron	Louis Chiron	O.S.C.A. Tipo 20				

^{1}Heat 1 grid; grid places for heat 2 were determined by the finishing order in heat 1

Previous race: 1953 United States Air Force Trophy	Formula One non-championship races 1953 season	Next race: 1953 Bristol MC & LCC Race
Previous race: 1952 Circuit du Lac	Circuit du Lac	Next race: —
