= 1952 Circuit du Lac =

Formula Two race

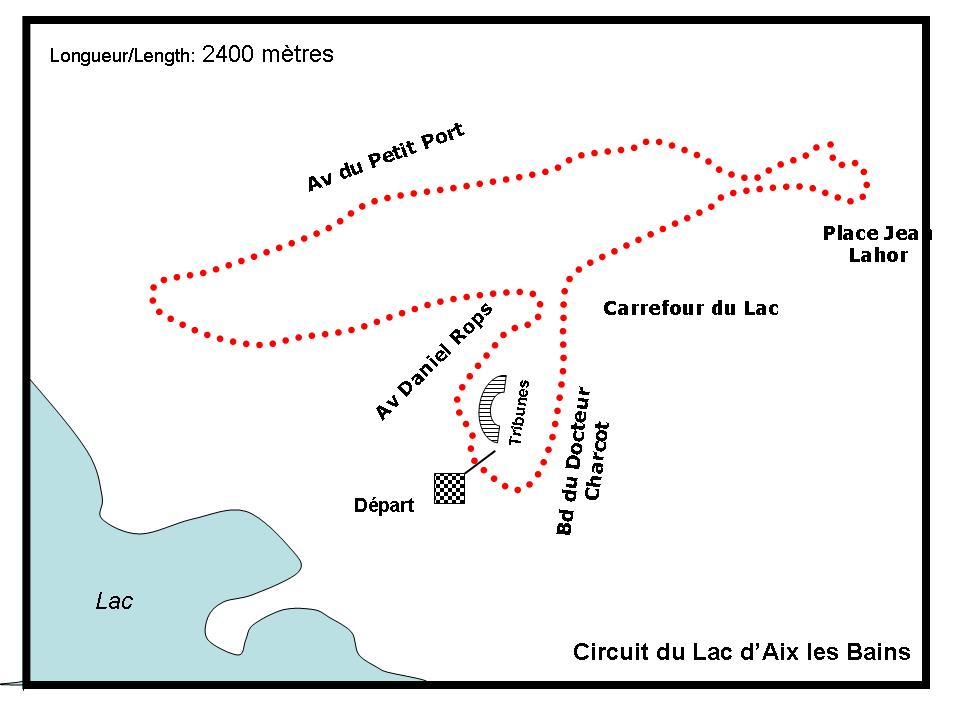

Race details
- Date: 8 June 1952
- Official name: IV Circuit du Lac
- Location: Aix-les-Bains Circuit du Lac, Savoie, France
- Course: Temporary Street Circuit
- Course length: 2.456 km (1.526 mi)
- Distance: 2 x 40 laps, 196.483 km (122.089 mi)

Pole position
Driver	(France) Jean Behra	Gordini

Fastest lap
Driver	(France) Jean Behra	Gordini
- Time: 1:35.2

Podium
First	(France) Jean Behra	Gordini
Second	(United Kingdom) Lance Macklin	HWM-Alta
Third	(Switzerland) Emmanuel de Graffenried	Maserati

The IV Circuit du Lac was a Formula Two motor race held on 8 June 1952 at the Aix-les-Bains Circuit du Lac, France. The race was run over two heats each of 40 laps, with the winner being decided by aggregate time. The winner was Jean Behra in a Gordini Type 16, who started from pole in both heats, won both heats and set overall fastest lap. Lance Macklin was second in an HWM-Alta and Emmanuel de Graffenried third in a Maserati 4CLT/48. Behra's teammate Robert Manzon set fastest lap in heat 1, but succumbed to mechanical failure in heat 2.

== Classification ==
=== Race ===
Pos	No	Driver	Entrant	Car	Time/Retired	Grid^{1}	Heat 1	Heat 2
1	4	(France) Jean Behra	Equipe Gordini	Gordini Type 16	2:10:42.1, 90.19 kph	1	1	1
2	12	(United Kingdom) Lance Macklin	HW Motors Ltd	HWM-Alta	+44.2s	5	3	2
3	8	(Switzerland) Emmanuel de Graffenried	Scuderia Enrico Platé	Maserati 4CLT/48	+1:26.2	4	4	3
4	10	(United States) Harry Schell	Scuderia Enrico Platé	Maserati 4CLT/48	+1 lap	3	5	4
5	6	(Thailand) B. Bira	Equipe Gordini	Simca Gordini Type 15	+2 laps	10	6	5
6	20	(France) Élie Bayol	Élie Bayol	O.S.C.A. MT4	+3 laps	12	8	7
NC	18	(France) Armand Philippe (France) Maurice Trintignant^{2}	Ecurie Rosier	Ferrari 166	+4 laps	8	NC	6
Ret	14	(United Kingdom) John Heath	HW Motors Ltd	HWM-Alta	-	9	7	24 laps, ignition
Ret	2	(France) Robert Manzon	Equipe Gordini	Gordini Type 16	-	6	2	2 laps, rear axle
Ret	24	(France) Jean Thepenier	Jean Thepenier	Simca Gordini Type 15	-	11	valve	-
Ret	16	(France) Maurice Trintignant	Ecurie Rosier	Ferrari 500	-	2	28 laps, magneto	-
Ret	22	(France) Eugene Martin	Eugene Martin	Jicey-Veritas	-	7	13 laps, front wheel	-

^{1}Heat 1 grid; grid places for heat 2 were determined by the finishing order in heat 1
^{2}Trintignant drove in heat 2

Previous race: 1952 Monza Grand Prix	Formula One non-championship races 1952 season	Next race: 1952 West Essex CC Race
Previous race: 1951 Circuit du Lac	Circuit du Lac	Next race: 1953 Circuit du Lac
