= Ferrari Grand Prix results =

The table below details the Grand Prix results for Scuderia Ferrari's factory team-entered and privately entered Formula One cars since 1950, with a separate list distinguishing between factory team entries and privateers. This distinction was particularly important in the early years of the Formula One championships.

== Formula One World Championship results ==
(key)

=== Scuderia Ferrari ===
Note. This table also includes entries by NART, since those were effectively proxy entries by Scuderia Ferrari itself.

==== 1950s ====
Year	Chassis	Engine	Tyres	Driver	1	2	3	4	5	6	7	8	9	10	11	Points	WCC
1950	125; 166F2-50; 275; 375	125 F1 1.5 V12 s 166 F2 2.0 V12; 3.3 V12; 375 F1 4.5 V12	P		GBR	MON	500	SUI	BEL	FRA	ITA					—N/a^{1}	
1950	125; 166F2-50; 275; 375	125 F1 1.5 V12 s 166 F2 2.0 V12; 3.3 V12; 375 F1 4.5 V12	P	(Italy) Alberto Ascari		2		Ret	5	DNS	2^{2}					—N/a^{1}	
1950	125; 166F2-50; 275; 375	125 F1 1.5 V12 s 166 F2 2.0 V12; 3.3 V12; 375 F1 4.5 V12	P	(Italy) Dorino Serafini							2^{2}					—N/a^{1}	
1950	125; 166F2-50; 275; 375	125 F1 1.5 V12 s 166 F2 2.0 V12; 3.3 V12; 375 F1 4.5 V12	P	(France) Raymond Sommer		4		Ret								—N/a^{1}	
1950	125; 166F2-50; 275; 375	125 F1 1.5 V12 s 166 F2 2.0 V12; 3.3 V12; 375 F1 4.5 V12	P	(Italy) Luigi Villoresi		Ret		Ret	6	DNS						—N/a^{1}	
1951	375	375 4.5 V12	P		SUI	500	BEL	FRA	GBR	GER	ITA	ESP				—N/a^{1}	
1951	375	375 4.5 V12	P	(Italy) Alberto Ascari	6		2	2^{2}	Ret	1^{P}	1	4^{P}				—N/a^{1}	
1951	375	375 4.5 V12	P	(Argentina) José Froilán González				2^{2}	1^{P}	3	2	2				—N/a^{1}	
1951	375	375 4.5 V12	P	(Italy) Piero Taruffi	2		Ret			5	5	Ret				—N/a^{1}	
1951	375	375 4.5 V12	P	(Italy) Luigi Villoresi	Ret		3	3	3	4	4	Ret				—N/a^{1}	
1952	375S	375 4.5 V12	F		SUI	500	BEL	FRA	GBR	GER	NED	ITA				—N/a^{1}	
1952	375S	375 4.5 V12	F	(Italy) Alberto Ascari		Ret										—N/a^{1}	
1952	500	500 2.0 L4	P	(Italy) Alberto Ascari			1^{P}^{F}	1^{P}^{F}	1^{F}	1^{P}^{F}	1^{P}^{F}	1^{P}^{F}				—N/a^{1}	
1952	500	500 2.0 L4	P	(Italy) Giuseppe Farina	Ret/ Ret^{2}^{P}		2	2	6^{P}	2	2	4				—N/a^{1}	
1952	500	500 2.0 L4	P	(France) Andre Simon	Ret^{2}							6				—N/a^{1}	
1952	500	500 2.0 L4	P	(Italy) Piero Taruffi	1^{F}		Ret	3	2	4		7				—N/a^{1}	
1952	500	500 2.0 L4	P	(Italy) Luigi Villoresi							3	3				—N/a^{1}	
1953	500; 553	500 2.0 L4; 553 2.0 L4	P		ARG	500	NED	BEL	FRA	GBR	GER	SUI	ITA			—N/a^{1}	
1953	500; 553	500 2.0 L4; 553 2.0 L4	P	(Italy) Alberto Ascari	1^{P}^{F}		1^{P}	1	4^{P}	1^{P}^{F}	8^{P}^{F}^{2}	1^{F}	Ret^{P}			—N/a^{1}	
1953	500; 553	500 2.0 L4; 553 2.0 L4	P	(Italy) Piero Carini									Ret			—N/a^{1}	
1953	500; 553	500 2.0 L4; 553 2.0 L4	P	(Italy) Giuseppe Farina	Ret		2	Ret	5	3	1	2	2			—N/a^{1}	
1953	500; 553	500 2.0 L4; 553 2.0 L4	P	(United Kingdom) Mike Hawthorn	4		4	6	1	5	3	3	4			—N/a^{1}	
1953	500; 553	500 2.0 L4; 553 2.0 L4	P	(Italy) Umberto Maglioli									8			—N/a^{1}	
1953	500; 553	500 2.0 L4; 553 2.0 L4	P	(Italy) Luigi Villoresi	2		Ret^{F}	2	6	Ret	8^{2}	6	3			—N/a^{1}	
1954	625; 553; 500	625 2.5 L4; 554 2.5 L4; 500 2.0 L4	P		ARG	500	BEL	FRA	GBR	GER	SUI	ITA	ESP			—N/a^{1}	
1954	625; 553; 500	625 2.5 L4; 554 2.5 L4; 500 2.0 L4	P	(Italy) Alberto Ascari								Ret				—N/a^{1}	
1954	625; 553; 500	625 2.5 L4; 554 2.5 L4; 500 2.0 L4	P	(Italy) Giuseppe Farina	2^{P}		Ret	WD					WD			—N/a^{1}	
1954	625; 553; 500	625 2.5 L4; 554 2.5 L4; 500 2.0 L4	P	(Argentina) José Froilán González	3^{F}		4^{2}	Ret	1^{F}	2^{2}	2^{P}	3^{F}^{2}				—N/a^{1}	
1954	625; 553; 500	625 2.5 L4; 554 2.5 L4; 500 2.0 L4	P	(United Kingdom) Mike Hawthorn	DSQ		4^{2}	Ret	2^{F}	2^{2}	Ret	2	1			—N/a^{1}	
1954	625; 553; 500	625 2.5 L4; 554 2.5 L4; 500 2.0 L4	P	(Italy) Umberto Maglioli	9						7	3^{2}				—N/a^{1}	
1954	625; 553; 500	625 2.5 L4; 554 2.5 L4; 500 2.0 L4	P	(France) Robert Manzon							DNS					—N/a^{1}	
1954	625; 553; 500	625 2.5 L4; 554 2.5 L4; 500 2.0 L4	P	(France) Maurice Trintignant			2	Ret	5	3	Ret	5	Ret			—N/a^{1}	
1954	625; 553; 500	625 2.5 L4; 554 2.5 L4; 500 2.0 L4	P	(Italy) Piero Taruffi						6						—N/a^{1}	
1955	D50; 555; 625	DS50 2.5 V8; 555 2.5 L4	E		ARG	MON	500	BEL	NED	GBR	ITA					—N/a^{1}	
1955	D50; 555; 625	DS50 2.5 V8; 555 2.5 L4	E	(Italy) Eugenio Castellotti					5	6^{2}	3					—N/a^{1}	
1955	D50; 555; 625	DS50 2.5 V8; 555 2.5 L4	E	(Italy) Giuseppe Farina	2^{2}/3^{2}	4		3								—N/a^{1}	
1955	D50; 555; 625	DS50 2.5 V8; 555 2.5 L4	E	(Belgium) Paul Frère		8^{2}		4								—N/a^{1}	
1955	D50; 555; 625	DS50 2.5 V8; 555 2.5 L4	E	(Belgium) Olivier Gendebien				DNA								—N/a^{1}	
1955	D50; 555; 625	DS50 2.5 V8; 555 2.5 L4	E	(Argentina) José Froilán González	2^{2}^{P}											—N/a^{1}	
1955	D50; 555; 625	DS50 2.5 V8; 555 2.5 L4	E	(United Kingdom) Mike Hawthorn					7	6^{2}	Ret					—N/a^{1}	
1955	D50; 555; 625	DS50 2.5 V8; 555 2.5 L4	E	(Italy) Umberto Maglioli	3^{2}						6					—N/a^{1}	
1955	D50; 555; 625	DS50 2.5 V8; 555 2.5 L4	E	(United States) Harry Schell		Ret		DNS								—N/a^{1}	
1955	D50; 555; 625	DS50 2.5 V8; 555 2.5 L4	E	(Italy) Piero Taruffi		8^{2}		DNS								—N/a^{1}	
1955	D50; 555; 625	DS50 2.5 V8; 555 2.5 L4	E	(France) Maurice Trintignant	2^{2}/3^{2} /Ret	1		6	Ret	Ret	8					—N/a^{1}	
1956	D50; 555	DS50 2.5 V8; 555 2.5 L4	E F P		ARG	MON	500	BEL	FRA	GBR	GER	ITA				—N/a^{1}	
1956	D50; 555	DS50 2.5 V8; 555 2.5 L4	E F P	(Italy) Eugenio Castellotti	Ret	4^{2}/ Ret		Ret	2	10^{2}	Ret^{2} /Ret	8^{2}/ Ret				—N/a^{1}	
1956	D50; 555	DS50 2.5 V8; 555 2.5 L4	E F P	(United Kingdom) Peter Collins	Ret	2^{2}		1	1	2^{2}/ Ret	Ret^{2} /Ret	2^{2}				—N/a^{1}	
1956	D50; 555	DS50 2.5 V8; 555 2.5 L4	E F P	(Argentina) Juan Manuel Fangio	1^{2}/ Ret^{P}^{F}	2^{2}/4^{2}^{P}^{F}		Ret^{P}	4^{P}^{F}	1	1^{P}^{F}	2^{2}/8^{2}^{P}^{F}				—N/a^{1}	
1956	D50; 555	DS50 2.5 V8; 555 2.5 L4	E F P	(Belgium) Paul Frère				2								—N/a^{1}	
1956	D50; 555	DS50 2.5 V8; 555 2.5 L4	E F P	(Belgium) Olivier Gendebien	5				Ret	DNA						—N/a^{1}	
1956	D50; 555	DS50 2.5 V8; 555 2.5 L4	E F P	(Italy) Luigi Musso	1^{2}	Ret					Ret^{2}	Ret				—N/a^{1}	
1956	D50; 555	DS50 2.5 V8; 555 2.5 L4	E F P	(Belgium) André Pilette				6								—N/a^{1}	
1956	D50; 555	DS50 2.5 V8; 555 2.5 L4	E F P	(Spain) Alfonso de Portago					Ret	2^{2}/ 10^{2}	Ret^{2}	Ret				—N/a^{1}	
1956	D50; 555	DS50 2.5 V8; 555 2.5 L4	E F P	(Germany) Wolfgang von Trips								DNS				—N/a^{1}	
1957	801	DS50 2.5 V8	P E		ARG	MON	500	FRA	GBR	GER	PES	ITA				—N/a^{1}	
1957	801	DS50 2.5 V8	P E	(Italy) Eugenio Castellotti	Ret											—N/a^{1}	
1957	801	DS50 2.5 V8	P E	(United Kingdom) Peter Collins	6^{2}/ Ret	Ret		3	Ret	3		Ret				—N/a^{1}	
1957	801	DS50 2.5 V8	P E	(Argentina) José Froilán González	5^{2}											—N/a^{1}	
1957	801	DS50 2.5 V8	P E	(Italy) Luigi Musso	Ret			2^{F}	2	4	Ret	8				—N/a^{1}	
1957	801	DS50 2.5 V8	P E	(United Kingdom) Mike Hawthorn	Ret	Ret		4	3	2		6				—N/a^{1}	
1957	801	DS50 2.5 V8	P E	(Italy) Cesare Perdisa	6^{2}											—N/a^{1}	
1957	801	DS50 2.5 V8	P E	(Spain) Alfonso de Portago	5^{2}											—N/a^{1}	
1957	801	DS50 2.5 V8	P E	(France) Maurice Trintignant		5		Ret	4							—N/a^{1}	
1957	801	DS50 2.5 V8	P E	(Germany) Wolfgang von Trips	6^{2}	7						3				—N/a^{1}	
1958	246	143 2.4 V6	E		ARG	MON	NED	500	BEL	FRA	GBR	GER	POR	ITA	MOR	40 (57)	2nd
1958	246	143 2.4 V6	E	(United Kingdom) Peter Collins	Ret	3	Ret		Ret	5	1	Ret				40 (57)	2nd
1958	246	143 2.4 V6	E	(Belgium) Olivier Gendebien					6					Ret	Ret	40 (57)	2nd
1958	246	143 2.4 V6	E	(United Kingdom) Mike Hawthorn	3	Ret^{F}	5		2^{P}^{F}	1^{P}^{F}	2^{F}	Ret^{P}	2^{F}	2	2^{P}	40 (57)	2nd
1958	246	143 2.4 V6	E	(Italy) Luigi Musso	2	2	7		Ret	Ret						40 (57)	2nd
1958	246	143 2.4 V6	E	(Germany) Wolfgang von Trips		Ret				3	Ret	4	5	Ret		40 (57)	2nd
1958	246	143 2.4 V6	E	(United States) Phil Hill										3^{F}	3	40 (57)	2nd
1958	D156	D156 1.5 V6	E	(United States) Phil Hill								9				—N/a	
1959	246; D156	155 2.4 V6; D156 1.5 V6	D		MON	500	NED	FRA	GBR	GER	POR	ITA	USA			32 (38)	2nd
1959	246; D156	155 2.4 V6; D156 1.5 V6	D	(United Kingdom) Cliff Allison	Ret		9			Ret		5	Ret			32 (38)	2nd
1959	246; D156	155 2.4 V6; D156 1.5 V6	D	(France) Jean Behra	Ret		5	Ret								32 (38)	2nd
1959	246; D156	155 2.4 V6; D156 1.5 V6	D	(United Kingdom) Tony Brooks	2		Ret	1^{P}		1^{P}^{F}	9	Ret	3			32 (38)	2nd
1959	246; D156	155 2.4 V6; D156 1.5 V6	D	(Belgium) Olivier Gendebien				4				6				32 (38)	2nd
1959	246; D156	155 2.4 V6; D156 1.5 V6	D	(United States) Dan Gurney				Ret		2	3	4				32 (38)	2nd
1959	246; D156	155 2.4 V6; D156 1.5 V6	D	(United States) Phil Hill	4		6	2		3	Ret	2^{F}	Ret			32 (38)	2nd
1959	246; D156	155 2.4 V6; D156 1.5 V6	D	(Germany) Wolfgang von Trips									6			32 (38)	2nd

==== 1960s ====
Year	Chassis	Engine	Tyres	Driver	1	2	3	4	5	6	7	8	9	10	11	12	Points	WCC
1960	246; 246P	155 2.4 V6; 171 2.4 V6	D		ARG	MON	500	NED	BEL	FRA	GBR	POR	ITA	USA			26 (27)	3rd
1960	246; 246P	155 2.4 V6; 171 2.4 V6	D	(United Kingdom) Cliff Allison	2	DNQ											26 (27)	3rd
1960	246; 246P	155 2.4 V6; 171 2.4 V6	D	(United States) Richie Ginther		6		6					2				26 (27)	3rd
1960	246; 246P	155 2.4 V6; 171 2.4 V6	D	(Argentina) José Froilán González	10												26 (27)	3rd
1960	246; 246P	155 2.4 V6; 171 2.4 V6	D	(United States) Phil Hill	8	3		Ret	4^{F}	12	7	Ret	1^{P}^{F}				26 (27)	3rd
1960	246; 246P	155 2.4 V6; 171 2.4 V6	D	(Belgium) Willy Mairesse					Ret	Ret			3				26 (27)	3rd
1960	246; 246P	155 2.4 V6; 171 2.4 V6	D	(Germany) Wolfgang von Trips	5	8		5	Ret	11	6	4	5				26 (27)	3rd
1961	156	178 1.5 V6	D		MON	NED	BEL	FRA	GBR	GER	ITA	USA					40 (52)	1st
1961	156	178 1.5 V6	D	(Belgium) Olivier Gendebien			4										40 (52)	1st
1961	156	178 1.5 V6	D	(United States) Richie Ginther	2^{F}	5	3^{F}	Ret	3	8	Ret						40 (52)	1st
1961	156	178 1.5 V6	D	(United States) Phil Hill	3	2^{P}	1^{P}	9^{P}^{F}	2^{P}	3^{P}^{F}	1						40 (52)	1st
1961	156	178 1.5 V6	D	(Belgium) Willy Mairesse						Ret							40 (52)	1st
1961	156	178 1.5 V6	D	(Mexico) Ricardo Rodríguez							Ret						40 (52)	1st
1961	156	178 1.5 V6	D	(Germany) Wolfgang von Trips	4	1	2	Ret	1	2	Ret^{P}						40 (52)	1st
1962	156	178 1.5 V6	D		NED	MON	BEL	FRA	GBR	GER	ITA	USA	RSA				18	6th
1962	156	178 1.5 V6	D	(Italy) Giancarlo Baghetti	4		Ret			10	5						18	6th
1962	156	178 1.5 V6	D	(Italy) Lorenzo Bandini		3				Ret	8						18	6th
1962	156	178 1.5 V6	D	(United States) Phil Hill	3	2	3		Ret	Ret	11						18	6th
1962	156	178 1.5 V6	D	(Belgium) Willy Mairesse		7	Ret				4						18	6th
1962	156	178 1.5 V6	D	(Mexico) Ricardo Rodríguez	Ret	DNS	4			6	Ret						18	6th
1963	156	178 1.5 V6	D		MON	BEL	NED	FRA	GBR	GER	ITA	USA	MEX	RSA			26	4th
1963	156	178 1.5 V6	D	(Italy) Lorenzo Bandini							Ret	5	Ret	5			26	4th
1963	156	178 1.5 V6	D	(Belgium) Willy Mairesse	Ret	Ret				Ret							26	4th
1963	156	178 1.5 V6	D	(Italy) Ludovico Scarfiotti		WD	6	DNS									26	4th
1963	156	178 1.5 V6	D	(United Kingdom) John Surtees	4^{F}	Ret	3	Ret	2^{F}	1^{F}	Ret^{P}	Ret	DSQ	Ret			26	4th
1964	156; 158; 1512	178 1.5 V6; 205B 1.5 V8; 207 1.5 F12	D		MON	NED	BEL	FRA	GBR	GER	AUT	ITA	USA	MEX			45 (49)	1st
1964	156; 158; 1512	178 1.5 V6; 205B 1.5 V8; 207 1.5 F12	D	(Italy) Lorenzo Bandini	10	Ret	Ret	9	5	3	1	3	Ret	3			45 (49)	1st
1964	156; 158; 1512	178 1.5 V6; 205B 1.5 V8; 207 1.5 F12	D	(Mexico) Pedro Rodríguez										6			45 (49)	1st
1964	156; 158; 1512	178 1.5 V6; 205B 1.5 V8; 207 1.5 F12	D	(Italy) Ludovico Scarfiotti								9					45 (49)	1st
1964	156; 158; 1512	178 1.5 V6; 205B 1.5 V8; 207 1.5 F12	D	(United Kingdom) John Surtees	Ret	2	Ret	Ret	3	1^{P}^{F}	Ret	1^{P}^{F}	2	2			45 (49)	1st
1965	158; 1512	205B 1.5 V8; 207 1.5 F12	D		RSA	MON	BEL	FRA	GBR	NED	GER	ITA	USA	MEX			26 (27)	4th
1965	158; 1512	205B 1.5 V8; 207 1.5 F12	D	(Italy) Lorenzo Bandini	15	2	9	8	Ret	9	6	4	4	8			26 (27)	4th
1965	158; 1512	205B 1.5 V8; 207 1.5 F12	D	(United States) Bob Bondurant									9				26 (27)	4th
1965	158; 1512	205B 1.5 V8; 207 1.5 F12	D	(Mexico) Pedro Rodríguez									5	7			26 (27)	4th
1965	158; 1512	205B 1.5 V8; 207 1.5 F12	D	(Italy) Ludovico Scarfiotti										DNS			26 (27)	4th
1965	158; 1512	205B 1.5 V8; 207 1.5 F12	D	(United Kingdom) John Surtees	2	4	Ret	3	3	7	Ret	Ret					26 (27)	4th
1965	158; 1512	205B 1.5 V8; 207 1.5 F12	D	(Italy) Nino Vaccarella								12					26 (27)	4th
1966	246; 312/66	228 2.4 V6; 218 3.0 V12	D F		MON	BEL	FRA	GBR	NED	GER	ITA	USA	MEX				31 (32)	2nd
1966	246; 312/66	228 2.4 V6; 218 3.0 V12	D F	(Italy) Lorenzo Bandini	2^{F}	3	NC^{P}^{F}		6	6	Ret	Ret					31 (32)	2nd
1966	246; 312/66	228 2.4 V6; 218 3.0 V12	D F	(United Kingdom) Mike Parkes			2		Ret	Ret	2^{P}						31 (32)	2nd
1966	246; 312/66	228 2.4 V6; 218 3.0 V12	D F	(Italy) Ludovico Scarfiotti						Ret	1^{F}						31 (32)	2nd
1966	246; 312/66	228 2.4 V6; 218 3.0 V12	D F	(United Kingdom) John Surtees	Ret	1^{P}^{F}											31 (32)	2nd
1967	312/66; 312/67	242 3.0 V12	F		RSA	MON	NED	BEL	FRA	GBR	GER	CAN	ITA	USA	MEX		20	5th
1967	312/66; 312/67	242 3.0 V12	F	(New Zealand) Chris Amon		3	4	3	Ret	3	3	6	7	Ret	9		20	5th
1967	312/66; 312/67	242 3.0 V12	F	(Italy) Lorenzo Bandini		Ret											20	5th
1967	312/66; 312/67	242 3.0 V12	F	(United Kingdom) Mike Parkes			5	Ret									20	5th
1967	312/66; 312/67	242 3.0 V12	F	(Italy) Ludovico Scarfiotti			6	NC									20	5th
1967	312/66; 312/67	242 3.0 V12	F	(United Kingdom) Jonathan Williams											8		20	5th
1968	312/67; 312/67/68; 312/68	242 3.0 V12; 242C 3.0 V12	F		RSA	ESP	MON	BEL	NED	FRA	GBR	GER	ITA	CAN	USA	MEX	32	4th
1968	312/67; 312/67/68; 312/68	242 3.0 V12; 242C 3.0 V12	F	(New Zealand) Chris Amon	4	Ret^{P}		Ret^{P}	6^{P}	10	2	Ret	Ret	Ret	Ret	Ret	32	4th
1968	312/67; 312/67/68; 312/68	242 3.0 V12; 242C 3.0 V12	F	(United Kingdom) Derek Bell									Ret		Ret		32	4th
1968	312/67; 312/67/68; 312/68	242 3.0 V12; 242C 3.0 V12	F	(Italy) Andrea de Adamich	Ret												32	4th
1968	312/67; 312/67/68; 312/68	242 3.0 V12; 242C 3.0 V12	F	(Belgium) Jacky Ickx	Ret	Ret		3	4	1	3	4^{P}	3	DNS		Ret	32	4th
1969	312/68; 312/69	255C 3.0 V12	F		RSA	ESP	MON	NED	FRA	GBR	GER	ITA	CAN	USA	MEX		7	6th
1969	312/68; 312/69	255C 3.0 V12	F	(New Zealand) Chris Amon	Ret	Ret	Ret	3	Ret	Ret							7	6th
1969	312/68; 312/69	255C 3.0 V12	F	(Italy) Ernesto Brambilla								DNS					7	6th
1969	312/68; 312/69	255C 3.0 V12	F	(Mexico) Pedro Rodríguez						Ret		6	Ret	5	7		7	6th

==== 1970s ====
Year	Chassis	Engine	Tyres	Driver	1	2	3	4	5	6	7	8	9	10	11	12	13	14	15	16	17	Points	WCC
1970	312B	001 3.0 F12	F		RSA	ESP	MON	BEL	NED	FRA	GBR	GER	AUT	ITA	CAN	USA	MEX					52 (55)	2nd
1970	312B	001 3.0 F12	F	(Italy) Ignazio Giunti				4		14			7	Ret								52 (55)	2nd
1970	312B	001 3.0 F12	F	(Belgium) Jacky Ickx	Ret	Ret	Ret	8	3^{F}	Ret^{P}	Ret	2^{P}^{F}	1^{F}	Ret^{P}	1	4^{P}^{F}	1^{F}					52 (55)	2nd
1970	312B	001 3.0 F12	F	(Switzerland) Clay Regazzoni					4		4	Ret	2^{F}	1^{F}	2^{F}	13	2^{P}					52 (55)	2nd
1971	312B; 312B2	001 3.0 F12; 001/1 3.0 F12	F		RSA	ESP	MON	NED	FRA	GBR	GER	AUT	ITA	CAN	USA							33	3rd
1971	312B; 312B2	001 3.0 F12; 001/1 3.0 F12	F	(United States) Mario Andretti	1^{F}	Ret	DNQ	Ret			4			13	DNS							33	3rd
1971	312B; 312B2	001 3.0 F12; 001/1 3.0 F12	F	(Belgium) Jacky Ickx	8	2^{P}^{F}	3	1^{P}^{F}	Ret	Ret	Ret	Ret	Ret	8	Ret^{F}							33	3rd
1971	312B; 312B2	001 3.0 F12; 001/1 3.0 F12	F	(Switzerland) Clay Regazzoni	3	Ret	Ret	3	Ret	Ret^{P}	3	Ret	Ret	Ret	6							33	3rd
1972	312B2	001/1 3.0 F12	F		ARG	RSA	ESP	MON	BEL	FRA	GBR	GER	AUT	ITA	CAN	USA						33	4th
1972	312B2	001/1 3.0 F12	F	(United States) Mario Andretti	Ret	4	Ret							7		6						33	4th
1972	312B2	001/1 3.0 F12	F	(Italy) Nanni Galli						13												33	4th
1972	312B2	001/1 3.0 F12	F	(Belgium) Jacky Ickx	3	8	2^{P}^{F}	2	Ret	11	Ret^{P}	1^{P}^{F}	Ret	Ret^{P}^{F}	12	5						33	4th
1972	312B2	001/1 3.0 F12	F	(Italy) Arturo Merzario							6	12										33	4th
1972	312B2	001/1 3.0 F12	F	(Switzerland) Clay Regazzoni	4	12	3	Ret	Ret			2	Ret	Ret	5	8						33	4th
1973	312B2; 312B3	001/1 3.0 F12; 001/11 3.0 F12	G		ARG	BRA	RSA	ESP	BEL	MON	SWE	FRA	GBR	NED	GER	AUT	ITA	CAN	USA			12	6th
1973	312B2; 312B3	001/1 3.0 F12; 001/11 3.0 F12	G	(Belgium) Jacky Ickx	4	5	Ret	12	Ret	Ret	6	5	8				8					12	6th
1973	312B2; 312B3	001/1 3.0 F12; 001/11 3.0 F12	G	(Italy) Arturo Merzario	9	4	4			Ret		7				7	Ret	15	16			12	6th
1974	312B3-74	001/11 3.0 F12	G		ARG	BRA	RSA	ESP	BEL	MON	SWE	NED	FRA	GBR	GER	AUT	ITA	CAN	USA			65	2nd
1974	312B3-74	001/11 3.0 F12	G	(Austria) Niki Lauda	2	Ret	16^{P}	1^{P}^{F}	2	Ret^{P}	Ret	1^{P}	2^{P}	5^{P}^{F}	Ret^{P}	Ret^{P}	Ret^{P}	Ret^{F}	Ret			65	2nd
1974	312B3-74	001/11 3.0 F12	G	(Switzerland) Clay Regazzoni	3^{F}	2^{F}	Ret	2	4^{P}	4	Ret	2	3	4	1	5^{F}	Ret	2	11			65	2nd
1975	312B3-74; 312T	001/11 3.0 F12; 015 3.0 F12	G		ARG	BRA	RSA	ESP	MON	BEL	SWE	NED	FRA	GBR	GER	AUT	ITA	USA				72.5	1st
1975	312B3-74; 312T	001/11 3.0 F12; 015 3.0 F12	G	(Austria) Niki Lauda	6	5	5	Ret^{P}	1^{P}	1^{P}	1^{F}	2^{P}^{F}	1^{P}	8	3^{P}	6^{P}^{‡}	3^{P}	1^{P}				72.5	1st
1975	312B3-74; 312T	001/11 3.0 F12; 015 3.0 F12	G	(Switzerland) Clay Regazzoni	4	4	16	NC	Ret	5^{F}	3	3	Ret	13^{F}	Ret^{F}	7	1^{F}	Ret				72.5	1st
1976	312T; 312T2	015 3.0 F12	G		BRA	RSA	USW	ESP	BEL	MON	SWE	FRA	GBR	GER	AUT	NED	ITA	CAN	USA	JPN		83	1st
1976	312T; 312T2	015 3.0 F12	G	(Austria) Niki Lauda	1	1^{F}	2	2	1^{P}^{F}	1^{P}	3	Ret^{F}	1^{P}^{F}	Ret			4	8	3	Ret		83	1st
1976	312T; 312T2	015 3.0 F12	G	(Switzerland) Clay Regazzoni	7	Ret	1^{P}^{F}	11	2	14^{F}	6	Ret	DSQ	9		2^{F}	2	6	7	5		83	1st
1976	312T; 312T2	015 3.0 F12	G	(Argentina) Carlos Reutemann													7					83	1st
1977	312T2	015 3.0 F12	G		ARG	BRA	RSA	USW	ESP	MON	BEL	SWE	FRA	GBR	GER	AUT	NED	ITA	USA	CAN	JPN	95 (97)	1st
1977	312T2	015 3.0 F12	G	(Austria) Niki Lauda	Ret	3	1	2^{P}^{F}	DNS	2	2	Ret	5	2	1^{F}	2^{P}	1^{F}	2	4			95 (97)	1st
1977	312T2	015 3.0 F12	G	(Canada) Gilles Villeneuve																12	Ret	95 (97)	1st
1977	312T2	015 3.0 F12	G	(Argentina) Carlos Reutemann	3	1	8	Ret	2	3	Ret	3	6	15	4	4	6	Ret	6	Ret	2	95 (97)	1st
1978	312T2; 312T3	015 3.0 F12	MI		ARG	BRA	RSA	USW	MON	BEL	ESP	SWE	FRA	GBR	GER	AUT	NED	ITA	USA	CAN		58	2nd
1978	312T2; 312T3	015 3.0 F12	MI	(Argentina) Carlos Reutemann	7	1^{F}	Ret	1^{P}	8^{P}	3	Ret	10	18^{F}	1	Ret	DSQ	7	3	1	3		58	2nd
1978	312T2; 312T3	015 3.0 F12	MI	(Canada) Gilles Villeneuve	8^{F}	Ret	Ret	Ret	Ret	4	10	9	12	Ret	8	3	6	7	Ret	1		58	2nd
1979	312T3; 312T4; 312T4B	015 3.0 F12	MI		ARG	BRA	RSA	USW	ESP	BEL	MON	FRA	GBR	GER	AUT	NED	ITA	CAN	USA			113	1st
1979	312T3; 312T4; 312T4B	015 3.0 F12	MI	(South Africa) Jody Scheckter	Ret	6	2	2	4	1	1^{P}	7	5	4	4	2	1	4	Ret			113	1st
1979	312T3; 312T4; 312T4B	015 3.0 F12	MI	(Canada) Gilles Villeneuve	Ret	5	1^{F}	1^{P}^{F}	7^{F}	7^{F}	Ret	2	14†	8^{F}	2	Ret^{F}	2	2	1			113	1st

==== 1980s ====
Year	Chassis	Engine	Tyres	Driver	1	2	3	4	5	6	7	8	9	10	11	12	13	14	15	16	Points	WCC
1980	312T5	015 3.0 F12	MI		ARG	BRA	RSA	USW	BEL	MON	FRA	GBR	GER	AUT	NED	ITA	CAN	USA			8	10th
1980	312T5	015 3.0 F12	MI	(South Africa) Jody Scheckter	Ret	Ret	Ret	5	8	Ret	12	10	13	13	9	8	DNQ	11			8	10th
1980	312T5	015 3.0 F12	MI	(Canada) Gilles Villeneuve	Ret	16	Ret	Ret	6	5	8	Ret	6	8	7	Ret	5	Ret			8	10th
1981	126CK	021 1.5 V6 t	MI		USW	BRA	ARG	SMR	BEL	MON	ESP	FRA	GBR	GER	AUT	NED	ITA	CAN	CPL		34	5th
1981	126CK	021 1.5 V6 t	MI	(France) Didier Pironi	Ret	Ret	Ret	5	8	4	15	5	Ret	Ret	9	Ret	5	Ret	9^{F}		34	5th
1981	126CK	021 1.5 V6 t	MI	(Canada) Gilles Villeneuve	Ret	Ret	Ret	7^{P}^{F}	4	1	1	Ret	Ret	10	Ret	Ret	Ret	3	DSQ		34	5th
1982	126C2	021 1.5 V6 t	G		RSA	BRA	USW	SMR	BEL	MON	DET	CAN	NED	GBR	FRA	GER	AUT	SUI	ITA	CPL	74	1st
1982	126C2	021 1.5 V6 t	G	(United States) Mario Andretti															3^{P}	Ret	74	1st
1982	126C2	021 1.5 V6 t	G	(France) Didier Pironi	18	6	Ret	1^{F}	DNS	2	3	9^{P}^{F}	1	2	3	DNS^{P}					74	1st
1982	126C2	021 1.5 V6 t	G	(France) Patrick Tambay									8	3	4	1	4	DNS	2	DNS	74	1st
1982	126C2	021 1.5 V6 t	G	(Canada) Gilles Villeneuve	Ret	Ret	DSQ	2	DNS												74	1st
1983	126C2B; 126C3	021 1.5 V6 t	G		BRA	USW	FRA	SMR	MON	BEL	DET	CAN	GBR	GER	AUT	NED	ITA	EUR	RSA		89	1st
1983	126C2B; 126C3	021 1.5 V6 t	G	(France) René Arnoux	10	3	7	3^{P}	Ret	Ret	Ret^{P}	1^{P}	5^{P}	1^{F}	2	1^{F}	2	9	Ret		89	1st
1983	126C2B; 126C3	021 1.5 V6 t	G	(France) Patrick Tambay	5	Ret^{P}	4	1	4	2	Ret	3^{F}	3	Ret^{P}	Ret^{P}	2	4	Ret	Ret^{P}		89	1st
1984	126C4	031 1.5 V6 t	G		BRA	RSA	BEL	SMR	FRA	MON	CAN	DET	DAL	GBR	GER	AUT	NED	ITA	EUR	POR	57.5	2nd
1984	126C4	031 1.5 V6 t	G	(Italy) Michele Alboreto	Ret	11	1^{P}	Ret	Ret	6^{‡}	Ret	Ret	Ret	5	Ret	3	Ret	2	2^{F}	4	57.5	2nd
1984	126C4	031 1.5 V6 t	G	(France) René Arnoux	Ret	Ret	3^{F}	2	4	3^{‡}	5	Ret	2	6	6	7	11^{F}	Ret	5	9	57.5	2nd
1985	156/85	031 1.5 V6 t	G		BRA	POR	SMR	MON	CAN	DET	FRA	GBR	GER	AUT	NED	ITA	BEL	EUR	RSA	AUS	82	2nd
1985	156/85	031 1.5 V6 t	G	(Italy) Michele Alboreto	2^{P}	2	Ret^{F}	2^{F}	1	3	Ret	2	1	3	4	13	Ret	Ret	Ret	Ret	82	2nd
1985	156/85	031 1.5 V6 t	G	(France) René Arnoux	4																82	2nd
1985	156/85	031 1.5 V6 t	G	(Sweden) Stefan Johansson		8	6	Ret	2	2	4	Ret	9	4	Ret	5	Ret	Ret	4	5	82	2nd
1986	F1/86	032 1.5 V6 t	G		BRA	ESP	SMR	MON	BEL	CAN	DET	FRA	GBR	GER	HUN	AUT	ITA	POR	MEX	AUS	37	4th
1986	F1/86	032 1.5 V6 t	G	(Italy) Michele Alboreto	Ret	Ret	10	Ret	4	8	4	8	Ret	Ret	Ret	2	Ret	5	Ret	Ret	37	4th
1986	F1/86	032 1.5 V6 t	G	(Sweden) Stefan Johansson	Ret	Ret	4	10	3	Ret	Ret	Ret	Ret	11	4	3	3	6	12	3	37	4th
1987	F1/87	033D 1.5 V6 t	G		BRA	SMR	BEL	MON	DET	FRA	GBR	GER	HUN	AUT	ITA	POR	ESP	MEX	JPN	AUS	53	4th
1987	F1/87	033D 1.5 V6 t	G	(Italy) Michele Alboreto	8	3	Ret	3	Ret	Ret	Ret	Ret	Ret	Ret	Ret	Ret	15	Ret	4	2	53	4th
1987	F1/87	033D 1.5 V6 t	G	(Austria) Gerhard Berger	4	Ret	Ret	4	4	Ret	Ret	Ret	Ret	Ret	4	2^{P}^{F}	Ret^{F}	Ret	1^{P}	1^{P}^{F}	53	4th
1988	F1/87/88C	033E 1.5 V6 t	G		BRA	SMR	MON	MEX	CAN	DET	FRA	GBR	GER	HUN	BEL	ITA	POR	ESP	JPN	AUS	65	2nd
1988	F1/87/88C	033E 1.5 V6 t	G	(Italy) Michele Alboreto	5	18	3	4	Ret	Ret	3	17	4	Ret	Ret	2^{F}	5	Ret	11	Ret	65	2nd
1988	F1/87/88C	033E 1.5 V6 t	G	(Austria) Gerhard Berger	2^{F}	5	2	3	Ret	Ret	4	9^{P}	3	4	Ret^{F}	1	Ret^{F}	6	4	Ret	65	2nd
1989	640	035/5 3.5 V12	G		BRA	SMR	MON	MEX	USA	CAN	FRA	GBR	GER	HUN	BEL	ITA	POR	ESP	JPN	AUS	59	3rd
1989	640	035/5 3.5 V12	G	(Austria) Gerhard Berger	Ret	Ret		Ret	Ret	Ret	Ret	Ret	Ret	Ret	Ret	2	1^{F}	2	Ret	Ret	59	3rd
1989	640	035/5 3.5 V12	G	(United Kingdom) Nigel Mansell	1	Ret	Ret	Ret^{F}	Ret	DSQ	2	2^{F}	3	1^{F}	3	Ret	DSQ		Ret	Ret	59	3rd

==== 1990s ====
Year	Chassis	Engine	Tyres	Driver	1	2	3	4	5	6	7	8	9	10	11	12	13	14	15	16	17	Points	WCC
1990	641	036 3.5 V12; 037 3.5 V12	G		USA	BRA	SMR	MON	CAN	MEX	FRA	GBR	GER	HUN	BEL	ITA	POR	ESP	JPN	AUS		110	2nd
1990	641	036 3.5 V12; 037 3.5 V12	G	(United Kingdom) Nigel Mansell	Ret	4	Ret	Ret	3	2	18^{P}^{F}	Ret^{P}^{F}	Ret	17	Ret	4	1^{P}	2	Ret	2^{F}		110	2nd
1990	641	036 3.5 V12; 037 3.5 V12	G	(France) Alain Prost	Ret	1	4	Ret	5	1^{F}	1	1	4	Ret	2^{F}	2	3	1	Ret	3		110	2nd
1991	642; 643	037 3.5 V12	G		USA	BRA	SMR	MON	CAN	MEX	FRA	GBR	GER	HUN	BEL	ITA	POR	ESP	JPN	AUS		55.5	3rd
1991	642; 643	037 3.5 V12	G	(France) Jean Alesi	12^{F}	6	Ret	3	Ret	Ret	4	Ret	3	5	Ret	Ret	3	4	Ret	Ret		55.5	3rd
1991	642; 643	037 3.5 V12	G	(France) Alain Prost	2	4	DNS	5^{F}	Ret	Ret	2	3	Ret	Ret	Ret	3	Ret	2	4			55.5	3rd
1991	642; 643	037 3.5 V12	G	(Italy) Gianni Morbidelli																6^{‡}		55.5	3rd
1992	F92A; F92AT	038 3.5 V12	G		RSA	MEX	BRA	ESP	SMR	MON	CAN	FRA	GBR	GER	HUN	BEL	ITA	POR	JPN	AUS		21	4th
1992	F92A; F92AT	038 3.5 V12	G	(France) Jean Alesi	Ret	Ret	4	3	Ret	Ret	3	Ret	Ret	5	Ret	Ret	Ret	Ret	5	4		21	4th
1992	F92A; F92AT	038 3.5 V12	G	(Italy) Ivan Capelli	Ret	Ret	5	10	Ret	Ret	Ret	Ret	9	Ret	6	Ret	Ret	Ret				21	4th
1992	F92A; F92AT	038 3.5 V12	G	(Italy) Nicola Larini															12	11		21	4th
1993	F93A	041 3.5 V12	G		RSA	BRA	EUR	SMR	ESP	MON	CAN	FRA	GBR	GER	HUN	BEL	ITA	POR	JPN	AUS		28	4th
1993	F93A	041 3.5 V12	G	(France) Jean Alesi	Ret	8	Ret	Ret	Ret	3	Ret	Ret	9	7	Ret	Ret	2	4	Ret	4		28	4th
1993	F93A	041 3.5 V12	G	(Austria) Gerhard Berger	6	Ret	Ret	Ret	6	14	4	14	Ret	6	3	10	Ret	Ret	Ret	5		28	4th
1994	412 T1; 412 T1B	041 3.5 V12; 043 3.5 V12	G		BRA	PAC	SMR	MON	ESP	CAN	FRA	GBR	GER	HUN	BEL	ITA	POR	EUR	JPN	AUS		71	3rd
1994	412 T1; 412 T1B	041 3.5 V12; 043 3.5 V12	G	(France) Jean Alesi	3			5	4	3	Ret	2	Ret	Ret	Ret	Ret^{P}	Ret	10	3	6		71	3rd
1994	412 T1; 412 T1B	041 3.5 V12; 043 3.5 V12	G	(Italy) Nicola Larini		Ret	2															71	3rd
1994	412 T1; 412 T1B	041 3.5 V12; 043 3.5 V12	G	(Austria) Gerhard Berger	Ret	2	Ret	3	Ret	4	3	Ret	1^{P}	12	Ret	2	Ret^{P}	5	Ret	2		71	3rd
1995	412 T2	044/1 3.0 V12	G		BRA	ARG	SMR	ESP	MON	CAN	FRA	GBR	GER	HUN	BEL	ITA	POR	EUR	PAC	JPN	AUS	73	3rd
1995	412 T2	044/1 3.0 V12	G	(France) Jean Alesi	5	2	2	Ret	Ret^{F}	1	5	2	Ret	Ret	Ret	Ret	5	2	5	Ret	Ret	73	3rd
1995	412 T2	044/1 3.0 V12	G	(Austria) Gerhard Berger	3	6	3^{F}	3	3	11	12	Ret	3	3	Ret^{P}	Ret^{F}	4	Ret	4	Ret	Ret	73	3rd
1996	F310	046 3.0 V10	G		AUS	BRA	ARG	EUR	SMR	MON	ESP	CAN	FRA	GBR	GER	HUN	BEL	ITA	POR	JPN		70	2nd
1996	F310	046 3.0 V10	G	(United Kingdom) Eddie Irvine	3	7	5	Ret	4	7^{†}	Ret	Ret	Ret	Ret	Ret	Ret	Ret	Ret	5	Ret		70	2nd
1996	F310	046 3.0 V10	G	(Germany) Michael Schumacher	Ret	3	Ret	2	2^{P}	Ret^{P}	1^{F}	Ret	DNS^{P}	Ret	4	9^{P}^{†}	1	1^{F}	3	2		70	2nd
1997	F310B	046/2 3.0 V10	G		AUS	BRA	ARG	SMR	MON	ESP	CAN	FRA	GBR	GER	HUN	BEL	ITA	AUT	LUX	JPN	EUR	102	2nd
1997	F310B	046/2 3.0 V10	G	(United Kingdom) Eddie Irvine	Ret	16	2	3	3	12	Ret	3	Ret	Ret	9^{†}	10^{†}	8	Ret	Ret	3	5	102	2nd
1997	F310B	046/2 3.0 V10	G	(Germany) Michael Schumacher	2	5	Ret	2	1^{F}	4	1^{P}	1^{P}^{F}	Ret^{F}	2	4^{P}	1	6	6	Ret	1	Ret	102	2nd
1998	F300	047 3.0 V10	G		AUS	BRA	ARG	SMR	ESP	MON	CAN	FRA	GBR	AUT	GER	HUN	BEL	ITA	LUX	JPN		133	2nd
1998	F300	047 3.0 V10	G	(United Kingdom) Eddie Irvine	4	8	3	3	Ret	3	3	2	3	4	8	Ret	Ret	2	4	2		133	2nd
1998	F300	047 3.0 V10	G	(Germany) Michael Schumacher	Ret	3	1	2^{F}	3	10	1^{F}	1	1^{F}	3	5	1^{F}	Ret^{F}	1^{P}	2^{P}	Ret^{P}^{F}		133	2nd
1999	F399	048 3.0 V10	B		AUS	BRA	SMR	MON	ESP	CAN	FRA	GBR	AUT	GER	HUN	BEL	ITA	EUR	MAL	JPN		128	1st
1999	F399	048 3.0 V10	B	(United Kingdom) Eddie Irvine	1	5	Ret	2	4	3^{F}	6	2	1	1	3	4	6	7	1	3		128	1st
1999	F399	048 3.0 V10	B	(Germany) Michael Schumacher	8^{F}	2	1^{F}	1	3^{F}	Ret^{P}	5	DNS							2^{P}^{F}	2^{P}^{F}		128	1st
1999	F399	048 3.0 V10	B	(Finland) Mika Salo									9	2	12	7	3	Ret				128	1st

==== 2000s ====
Year	Chassis	Engine	Tyres	Driver	1	2	3	4	5	6	7	8	9	10	11	12	13	14	15	16	17	18	19	Points	WCC
2000	F1-2000	049 3.0 V10	B		AUS	BRA	SMR	GBR	ESP	EUR	MON	CAN	FRA	AUT	GER	HUN	BEL	ITA	USA	JPN	MAL			170	1st
2000	F1-2000	049 3.0 V10	B	(Brazil) Rubens Barrichello	2^{F}	Ret	4	Ret^{P}	3	4	2	2	3	3	1^{F}	4	Ret^{F}	Ret	2	4	3			170	1st
2000	F1-2000	049 3.0 V10	B	(Germany) Michael Schumacher	1	1^{F}	1	3	5^{P}	1^{F}	Ret^{P}	1^{P}	Ret^{P}	Ret	Ret	2^{P}	2	1^{P}	1^{P}	1^{P}	1^{P}			170	1st
2001	F2001	050 3.0 V10	B		AUS	MAL	BRA	SMR	ESP	AUT	MON	CAN	EUR	FRA	GBR	GER	HUN	BEL	ITA	USA	JPN			179	1st
2001	F2001	050 3.0 V10	B	(Brazil) Rubens Barrichello	3	2	Ret	3	Ret	3	2	Ret	5	3	3	2	2^{F}	5	2	15^{†}	5			179	1st
2001	F2001	050 3.0 V10	B	(Germany) Michael Schumacher	1^{P}^{F}	1^{P}	2^{P}	Ret	1^{P}^{F}	2^{P}	1	2^{P}	1^{P}	1	2^{P}	Ret	1^{P}	1^{F}	4	2^{P}	1^{P}			179	1st
2002	F2001B; F2002	050 3.0 V10; 051 3.0 V10	B		AUS	MAL	BRA	SMR	ESP	AUT	MON	CAN	EUR	GBR	FRA	GER	HUN	BEL	ITA	USA	JPN			221	1st
2002	F2001B; F2002	050 3.0 V10; 051 3.0 V10	B	(Brazil) Rubens Barrichello	Ret^{P}	Ret	Ret	2^{F}	DNS	2^{P}	7^{F}	3	1	2^{F}	DNS	4	1^{P}	2	1^{F}	1^{F}	2			221	1st
2002	F2001B; F2002	050 3.0 V10; 051 3.0 V10	B	(Germany) Michael Schumacher	1	3^{P}	1	1^{P}	1^{P}^{F}	1^{F}	2	1	2^{F}	1	1	1^{P}^{F}	2^{F}	1^{P}^{F}	2	2^{P}	1^{P}^{F}			221	1st
2003	F2002B; F2003-GA	051 3.0 V10; 052 3.0 V10	B		AUS	MAL	BRA	SMR	ESP	AUT	MON	CAN	EUR	FRA	GBR	GER	HUN	ITA	USA	JPN				158	1st
2003	F2002B; F2003-GA	051 3.0 V10; 052 3.0 V10	B	(Brazil) Rubens Barrichello	Ret	2	Ret^{P}^{F}	3	3^{F}	3	8	5	3	7	1^{P}^{F}	Ret	Ret	3	Ret	1^{P}				158	1st
2003	F2002B; F2003-GA	051 3.0 V10; 052 3.0 V10	B	(Germany) Michael Schumacher	4^{P}	6^{F}	Ret	1^{P}^{F}	1^{P}	1^{P}^{F}	3	1	5	3	4	7	8	1^{P}^{F}	1^{F}	8				158	1st
2004	F2004	053 3.0 V10	B		AUS	MAL	BHR	SMR	ESP	MON	EUR	CAN	USA	FRA	GBR	GER	HUN	BEL	ITA	CHN	JPN	BRA		262	1st
2004	F2004	053 3.0 V10	B	(Brazil) Rubens Barrichello	2	4	2	6	2	3	2	2^{F}	2^{P}^{F}	3	3	12	2	3	1^{P}^{F}	1^{P}	Ret^{F}	3^{P}		262	1st
2004	F2004	053 3.0 V10	B	(Germany) Michael Schumacher	1^{P}^{F}	1^{P}	1^{P}^{F}	1^{F}	1^{P}^{F}	Ret^{F}	1^{P}^{F}	1	1	1^{F}	1^{F}	1^{P}	1^{P}^{F}	2	2	12^{F}	1^{P}	7		262	1st
2005	F2004M; F2005	053 3.0 V10; 055 3.0 V10	B		AUS	MAL	BHR	SMR	ESP	MON	EUR	CAN	USA	FRA	GBR	GER	HUN	TUR	ITA	BEL	BRA	JPN	CHN	100	3rd
2005	F2004M; F2005	053 3.0 V10; 055 3.0 V10	B	(Brazil) Rubens Barrichello	2	Ret	9	Ret	9	8	3	3	2	9	7	10	10	10	12	5	6	11	12	100	3rd
2005	F2004M; F2005	053 3.0 V10; 055 3.0 V10	B	(Germany) Michael Schumacher	Ret	7	Ret	2^{F}	Ret	7^{F}	5	2	1^{F}	3	6	5	2^{P}	Ret	10	Ret	4	7	Ret	100	3rd
2006	248 F1	056 2.4 V8	B		BHR	MAL	AUS	SMR	EUR	ESP	MON	GBR	CAN	USA	FRA	GER	HUN	TUR	ITA	CHN	JPN	BRA		201	2nd
2006	248 F1	056 2.4 V8	B	(Brazil) Felipe Massa	9	5	Ret	4	3	4^{F}	9	5	6	2	3	2	7^{F}	1^{P}	9	Ret	2^{P}	1^{P}		201	2nd
2006	248 F1	056 2.4 V8	B	(Germany) Michael Schumacher	2^{P}	6	Ret	1^{P}	1^{F}	2	5^{F}	2	2	1^{P}^{F}	1^{P}^{F}	1^{F}	8^{†}	3^{F}	1	1	Ret	4^{F}		201	2nd
2007	F2007	056 2.4 V8	B		AUS	MAL	BHR	ESP	MON	CAN	USA	FRA	GBR	EUR	HUN	TUR	ITA	BEL	JPN	CHN	BRA			204	1st
2007	F2007	056 2.4 V8	B	(Brazil) Felipe Massa	6	5^{P}	1^{P}^{F}	1^{P}^{F}	3	DSQ	3	2^{P}^{F}	5	2^{F}	13	1^{P}	Ret	2^{F}	6	3^{F}	2^{P}			204	1st
2007	F2007	056 2.4 V8	B	(Finland) Kimi Räikkönen	1^{P}^{F}	3	3	Ret	8	5	4^{F}	1	1^{F}	Ret^{P}	2^{F}	2^{F}	3	1^{P}	3	1	1^{F}			204	1st
2008	F2008	056 2.4 V8	B		AUS	MAL	BHR	ESP	TUR	MON	CAN	FRA	GBR	GER	HUN	EUR	BEL	ITA	SIN	JPN	CHN	BRA		172	1st
2008	F2008	056 2.4 V8	B	(Brazil) Felipe Massa	Ret	Ret^{P}	1	2	1^{P}	3^{P}	5	1	13	3	17^{†}	1^{P}^{F}	1	6	13^{P}	7^{F}	2	1^{P}^{F}		172	1st
2008	F2008	056 2.4 V8	B	(Finland) Kimi Räikkönen	8^{†}	1	2	1^{P}^{F}	3^{F}	9^{F}	Ret^{F}	2^{P}^{F}	4^{F}	6	3^{F}	Ret	18^{F}^{†}	9^{F}	15^{F}^{†}	3	3	3		172	1st
2009	F60	056 2.4 V8	B		AUS	MAL	CHN	BHR	ESP	MON	TUR	GBR	GER	HUN	EUR	BEL	ITA	SIN	JPN	BRA	ABU			70	4th
2009	F60	056 2.4 V8	B	(Brazil) Felipe Massa	Ret	12	Ret	14	6	4^{F}	6	4	3	DNS										70	4th
2009	F60	056 2.4 V8	B	(Finland) Kimi Räikkönen	15^{†}	14	10	6	Ret	3	9	8	Ret	2	3	1	3	10	4	6	12			70	4th
2009	F60	056 2.4 V8	B	(Italy) Luca Badoer											17	14								70	4th
2009	F60	056 2.4 V8	B	(Italy) Giancarlo Fisichella													9	13	12	10	16			70	4th

==== 2010s ====
Year	Chassis	Engine	Tyres	Driver	1	2	3	4	5	6	7	8	9	10	11	12	13	14	15	16	17	18	19	20	21	Points	WCC
2010	F10	056 2.4 V8	B		BHR	AUS	MAL	CHN	ESP	MON	TUR	CAN	EUR	GBR	GER	HUN	BEL	ITA	SIN	JPN	KOR	BRA	ABU			396	3rd
2010	F10	056 2.4 V8	B	(Spain) Fernando Alonso	1^{F}	4	13^{†}	4	2	6	8	3	8	14^{F}	1	2	Ret	1^{P}^{F}	1^{P}^{F}	3	1^{F}	3	7			396	3rd
2010	F10	056 2.4 V8	B	(Brazil) Felipe Massa	2	3	7	9	6	4	7	15	11	15	2	4	4	3	8	Ret	3	15	10			396	3rd
2011	150° Italia	056 2.4 V8	P		AUS	MAL	CHN	TUR	ESP	MON	CAN	EUR	GBR	GER	HUN	BEL	ITA	SIN	JPN	KOR	IND	ABU	BRA			375	3rd
2011	150° Italia	056 2.4 V8	P	(Spain) Fernando Alonso	4	6	7	3	5	2	Ret	2	1^{F}	2	3	4	3	4	2	5	3	2	4			375	3rd
2011	150° Italia	056 2.4 V8	P	(Brazil) Felipe Massa	7^{F}	5	6	11	Ret	Ret	6	5	5	5	6^{F}	8	6	9	7	6	Ret	5	5			375	3rd
2012	F2012	056 2.4 V8	P		AUS	MAL	CHN	BHR	ESP	MON	CAN	EUR	GBR	GER	HUN	BEL	ITA	SIN	JPN	KOR	IND	ABU	USA	BRA		400	2nd
2012	F2012	056 2.4 V8	P	(Spain) Fernando Alonso	5	1	9	7	2	3	5	1	2^{P}	1^{P}	5	Ret	3	3	Ret	3	2	2	3	2		400	2nd
2012	F2012	056 2.4 V8	P	(Brazil) Felipe Massa	Ret	15	13	9	15	6	10	16	4	12	9	5	4	8	2	4	6	7	4	3		400	2nd
2013	F138	056 2.4 V8	P		AUS	MAL	CHN	BHR	ESP	MON	CAN	GBR	GER	HUN	BEL	ITA	SIN	KOR	JPN	IND	ABU	USA	BRA			354	3rd
2013	F138	056 2.4 V8	P	(Spain) Fernando Alonso	2	Ret	1	8	1	7	2	3	4^{F}	5	2	2	2	6	4	11	5^{F}	5	3			354	3rd
2013	F138	056 2.4 V8	P	(Brazil) Felipe Massa	4	5	6	15	3	Ret	8	6	Ret	8	7	4	6	9	10	4	8	12	7			354	3rd
2014	F14 T	059/3 1.6 V6 t	P		AUS	MAL	BHR	CHN	ESP	MON	CAN	AUT	GBR	GER	HUN	BEL	ITA	SIN	JPN	RUS	USA	BRA	ABU			216	4th
2014	F14 T	059/3 1.6 V6 t	P	(Spain) Fernando Alonso	4	4	9	3	6	4	6	5	6	5	2	7	Ret	4	Ret	6	6	6	9			216	4th
2014	F14 T	059/3 1.6 V6 t	P	(Finland) Kimi Räikkönen	7	12	10	8	7	12^{F}	10	10	Ret	11	6	4	9	8	12	9	13	7	10			216	4th
2015	SF15-T	060 1.6 V6 t	P		AUS	MAL	CHN	BHR	ESP	MON	CAN	AUT	GBR	HUN	BEL	ITA	SIN	JPN	RUS	USA	MEX	BRA	ABU			428	2nd
2015	SF15-T	060 1.6 V6 t	P	(Finland) Kimi Räikkönen	Ret	4	4	2^{F}	5	6	4^{F}	Ret	8	Ret	7	5	3	4	8	Ret	Ret	4	3			428	2nd
2015	SF15-T	060 1.6 V6 t	P	(Germany) Sebastian Vettel	3	1	3	5	3	2	5	4	3	1	12^{†}	2	1^{P}	3	2^{F}	3	Ret	3	4			428	2nd
2016	SF16-H	061 1.6 V6 t	P		AUS	BHR	CHN	RUS	ESP	MON	CAN	EUR	AUT	GBR	HUN	GER	BEL	ITA	SIN	MAL	JPN	USA	MEX	BRA	ABU	398	3rd
2016	SF16-H	061 1.6 V6 t	P	(Finland) Kimi Räikkönen	Ret	2	5	3	2	Ret	6	4	3	5	6^{F}	6	9	4	4	4	5	Ret	6	Ret	6	398	3rd
2016	SF16-H	061 1.6 V6 t	P	(Germany) Sebastian Vettel	3	DNS	2	Ret	3	4	2	2	Ret	9	4	5	6	3	5	Ret	4^{F}	4^{F}	5	5	3^{F}	398	3rd
2017	SF70H	062 1.6 V6 t	P		AUS	CHN	BHR	RUS	ESP	MON	CAN	AZE	AUT	GBR	HUN	BEL	ITA	SIN	MAL	JPN	USA	MEX	BRA	ABU		522	2nd
2017	SF70H	062 1.6 V6 t	P	(Finland) Kimi Räikkönen	4^{F}	5	4	3^{F}	Ret	2^{P}	7	14^{†}	5	3	2	4	5	Ret	DNS	5	3	3	3	4		522	2nd
2017	SF70H	062 1.6 V6 t	P	(Germany) Sebastian Vettel	1	2	1	2^{P}	2	1	4	4^{F}	2	7	1^{P}	2^{F}	3	Ret^{P}	4^{F}	Ret	2^{F}	4^{P}^{F}	1	3		522	2nd
2018	SF71H	062 EVO 1.6 V6 t	P		AUS	BHR	CHN	AZE	ESP	MON	CAN	FRA	AUT	GBR	GER	HUN	BEL	ITA	SIN	RUS	JPN	USA	MEX	BRA	ABU	571	2nd
2018	SF71H	062 EVO 1.6 V6 t	P	(Finland) Kimi Räikkönen	3	Ret	3	2	Ret	4	6	3	2^{F}	3	3	3	Ret	2^{P}	5	4	5	1	3	3	Ret	571	2nd
2018	SF71H	062 EVO 1.6 V6 t	P	(Germany) Sebastian Vettel	1	1^{P}	8^{P}	4^{P}	4	2	1^{P}	5	3	1^{F}	Ret^{P}	2	1	4	3	3	6^{F}	4	2	6	2^{F}	571	2nd
2019	SF90	064 1.6 V6 t	P		AUS	BHR	CHN	AZE	ESP	MON	CAN	FRA	AUT	GBR	GER	HUN	BEL	ITA	SIN	RUS	JPN	MEX	USA	BRA	ABU	504	2nd
2019	SF90	064 1.6 V6 t	P	(Monaco) Charles Leclerc	5	3^{P}^{F}	5	5^{F}	5	Ret	3	3	2^{P}	3	Ret	4	1^{P}	1^{P}	2^{P}	3^{P}	6	4^{P}^{F}	4^{F}	18^{†}	3	504	2nd
2019	SF90	064 1.6 V6 t	P	(Germany) Sebastian Vettel	4	5	3	3	4	2	2^{P}	5^{F}	4	16	2	3	4^{F}	13	1	Ret	2^{P}	2	Ret	17^{†}	5	504	2nd

==== 2020s ====
Key

Key
Colour	Result
Gold	Winner
Silver	Second place
Bronze	Third place
Green	Other points position
Blue	Other classified position
Blue	Not classified, finished (NC)
Purple	Not classified, retired (Ret)
Red	Did not qualify (DNQ)
Black	Disqualified (DSQ)
White	Did not start (DNS)
White	Race cancelled (C)
Blank	Did not practice (DNP)
Blank	Excluded (EX)
Blank	Did not arrive (DNA)
Blank	Withdrawn (WD)
Blank	Did not enter (empty cell)
Annotation	Meaning
P	Pole position
F	Fastest lap
Superscript number	Points-scoring position in sprint

Year	Chassis	Engine	Tyres	Driver	1	2	3	4	5	6	7	8	9	10	11	12	13	14	15	16	17	18	19	20	21	22	23	24	Points	WCC
2020	SF1000	065 1.6 V6 t	P		AUT	STY	HUN	GBR	70A	ESP	BEL	ITA	TUS	RUS	EIF	POR	EMI	TUR	BHR	SKH	ABU								131	6th
2020	SF1000	065 1.6 V6 t	P	(Monaco) Charles Leclerc	2	Ret	11	3	4	Ret	14	Ret	8	6	7	4	5	4	10	Ret	13								131	6th
2020	SF1000	065 1.6 V6 t	P	(Germany) Sebastian Vettel	10	Ret	6	10	12	7	13	Ret	10	13	11	10	12	3	13	12	14								131	6th
2021	SF21	065/6 1.6 V6 t	P		BHR	EMI	POR	ESP	MON	AZE	FRA	STY	AUT	GBR	HUN	BEL	NED	ITA	RUS	TUR	USA	MXC	SAP	QAT	SAU	ABU			323.5	3rd
2021	SF21	065/6 1.6 V6 t	P	(Monaco) Charles Leclerc	6	4	6	4	DNS^{P}	4^{P}	16	7	8	2	Ret	8^{‡}	5	4	15	4	4	5	5	8	7	10			323.5	3rd
2021	SF21	065/6 1.6 V6 t	P	(Spain) Carlos Sainz Jr.	8	5	11	7	2	8	11	6	5	6	3	10^{‡}	7	6	3	8	7	6	6^{3}	7	8	3			323.5	3rd
2022	F1-75	066/7 1.6 V6 t	P		BHR	SAU	AUS	EMI	MIA	ESP	MON	AZE	CAN	GBR	AUT	FRA	HUN	BEL	NED	ITA	SIN	JPN	USA	MXC	SAP	ABU			554	2nd
2022	F1-75	066/7 1.6 V6 t	P	(Monaco) Charles Leclerc	1^{P}^{F}	2^{F}	1^{P}^{F}	6^{2}	2^{P}	Ret^{P}	4^{P}	Ret^{P}	5	4	1^{2}	Ret^{P}	6	6	3	2^{P}	2^{P}	3	3	6	4^{6}	2			554	2nd
2022	F1-75	066/7 1.6 V6 t	P	(Spain) Carlos Sainz Jr.	2	3	Ret	Ret^{4}	3	4	2	Ret	2^{F}	1^{P}	Ret^{3}	5^{F}	4	3^{P}	8	4	3	Ret	Ret^{P}	5	3^{2}	4			554	2nd
2023	SF-23	066/10 1.6 V6 t	P		BHR	SAU	AUS	AZE	MIA	MON	ESP	CAN	AUT	GBR	HUN	BEL	NED	ITA	SIN	JPN	QAT	USA	MXC	SAP	LVG	ABU			406	3rd
2023	SF-23	066/10 1.6 V6 t	P	(Monaco) Charles Leclerc	Ret	7	Ret	3^{P 2}	7	6	11	4	2	9	7	3^{P 5}	Ret	4	4	4	5	DSQ^{P 3}	3^{P}	DNS^{5}	2^{P}	2			406	3rd
2023	SF-23	066/10 1.6 V6 t	P	(Spain) Carlos Sainz Jr.	4	6	12	5^{5}	5	8	5	5	6^{3}	10	8	Ret^{4}	5	3^{P}	1^{P}	6	DNS^{6}	3^{6}	4	6^{8}	6	18†			406	3rd
2024	SF-24	066/12 1.6 V6 t	P		BHR	SAU	AUS	JPN	CHN	MIA	EMI	MON	CAN	ESP	AUT	GBR	HUN	BEL	NED	ITA	AZE	SIN	USA	MXC	SAP	LVG	QAT	ABU	652	2nd
2024	SF-24	066/12 1.6 V6 t	P	(Monaco) Charles Leclerc	4	3^{F}	2^{F}	4	4^{4}	3^{2}	3	1^{P}	Ret	5	11^{7}	14	4	3^{P}	3	1	2^{P}	5	1^{4}	3^{F}	5^{3}	4	2^{5}	3	652	2nd
2024	SF-24	066/12 1.6 V6 t	P	(Spain) Carlos Sainz Jr.	3	WD	1	3	5^{5}	5^{5}	5	3	Ret	6	3^{5}	5^{F}	6	6	5	4	18†	7	2^{2}	1^{P}	Ret^{5}	3	6^{4}	2	652	2nd
2024	SF-24	066/12 1.6 V6 t	P	(United Kingdom) Oliver Bearman		7																							652	2nd
2025	SF-25	066/12 1.6 V6 t	P		AUS	CHN	JPN	BHR	SAU	MIA	EMI	MON	ESP	CAN	AUT	GBR	BEL	HUN	NED	ITA	AZE	SIN	USA	MXC	SAP	LVG	QAT	ABU	398	4th
2025	SF-25	066/12 1.6 V6 t	P	(United Kingdom) Lewis Hamilton	10	DSQ^{1}	7	5	7	8^{3}	4	5	6	6	4	4	7	12	Ret	6	8	8^{F}	4^{4}	8	Ret^{7}	8	12	8	398	4th
2025	SF-25	066/12 1.6 V6 t	P	(Monaco) Charles Leclerc	8	DSQ^{5}	4	4	3	7	6	2	3	5	3	14	3^{4}	4^{P}	Ret	4	9	6	3^{5}	2	Ret^{5}	4	8	4^{F}	398	4th
2026	SF-26	067/6 1.6 V6 t	P		AUS	CHN	JPN	MIA	CAN	MON	BCN	AUT	GBR	BEL	HUN	NED	ITA	ESP	AZE	BHR	SIN	USA	MXC	SAP	LVG	QAT	ABU		338*	2nd*
2026	SF-26	067/6 1.6 V6 t	P	(United Kingdom) Lewis Hamilton	4	3^{3}	6	6^{7}	2^{6}	2	1^{F}	5	3^{2}	4	5	4^{7}													338*	2nd*
2026	SF-26	067/6 1.6 V6 t	P	(Monaco) Charles Leclerc	3	4^{2}	3	8^{3}	4^{5}	Ret	15†	8	1^{5}	2	4^{F}	5^{2 F}													338*	2nd*

Notes

- * – Season still in progress.
- ^{†} – The driver did not finish the Grand Prix, but was classified, as he completed over 90% of the race distance.
- ^{‡} – Half points awarded as less than 75% of the race distance was completed.
- ^{1} – The Constructors World Championship did not exist before 1958.
- ^{2} – Shared drive.

=== Esports ===
Year	Name	Car	Engine	Tyres	No.	Drivers	Points	WCC
2019	(Italy) Ferrari Driver Academy	SF90	064 1.6 V6 t	P	46. 69. N.A.	(Italy) David Tonizza (Italy) Amos Laurito (Italy) Gianfranco Giglioli	184	2nd
2020	(Italy) FDA Hublot Esports Team	SF1000	065 1.6 V6 t	P	95. 74. 83.	(Italy) David Tonizza (Italy) Enzo Bonito (El Salvador) Filip Prešnajder	100	5th
2021	(Italy) Ferrari Driver Academy Esports Team	SF21	065/6 1.6 V6 t	P	95. 72. 29.	(Italy) David Tonizza (United Kingdom) Brendon Leigh (Italy) Domenica Lovece	125	4th
2022	(Italy) Scuderia Ferrari Velas Esports Team	F1-75	066/7 1.6 V6 t	P	72. 95. 8.	(United Kingdom) Brendon Leigh (Italy) David Tonizza (Chile) Fabrizio Donoso	79	7th
2023-24	(Italy) Scuderia Ferrari Esports	SF-23	066/10 1.6 V6 t	P	7. 40. 62.	(Iran) Bari Broumand (France) Nicolas Longuet (Hungary) Itsván Puki	253	1st
2025	(Italy) Scuderia Ferrari HP Esports Team	SF-24	066/12 1.6 V6 t	P	40. 7. 32.	(France) Nicolas Longuet (Iran) Bari Broumand (United Kingdom) John Evans	207	2nd
2026	(Italy) Scuderia Ferrari HP Esports	SF-26	067/6 1.6 V6 t	P	32. 54. 77.	(United Kingdom) John Evans (Spain) Ismael Fahssi (Iran) Bari Broumand	220	3rd

==== Esports Drivers' Champions ====
The following drivers won the Formula One Esports Drivers' Championship for Scuderia Ferrari Esports Team:

- (Italy) David Tonizza (2019).

=== Complete F1 Esports Series results ===
Year	Chassis	Drivers	1	2	3	4	5	6	7	8	9	10	11	12	Points	WCC
2019	Ferrari SF90		BHR	CHN	AZE	CAN	RBR	GBR	GER	BEL	ITA	JPN	USA	BRA	184	2nd
2019	Ferrari SF90	(Italy) David Tonizza	1	1	3	8	1	5	3	4	3	4	6	2	184	2nd
2019	Ferrari SF90	(Italy) Amos Laurito	16	16	13	19	16		19	17		20	17		184	2nd
2019	Ferrari SF90	(Italy) Gianfranco Giglioli						17			16			15	184	2nd
2020	Ferrari SF1000		BHR	VIE	CHN	NED	CAN	RBR	GBR	BEL	ITA	JPN	MEX	BRA	100	5th
2020	Ferrari SF1000	(Italy) David Tonizza	20	1	19	11	Ret	10	5	8	1	7	Ret	6	100	5th
2020	Ferrari SF1000	(Italy) Enzo Bonito	14	7	20	10	11	11	8		5	14	11	19	100	5th
2020	Ferrari SF1000	(Slovakia) Filip Prešnajder								11					100	5th
2021	Ferrari SF21		BHR	CHN	RBR	GBR	ITA	BEL	POR	NED	USA	EMI	MEX	BRA	125	4th
2021	Ferrari SF21	(Italy) David Tonizza	9	14	5	10	15	3	6	5	5	1	9		125	4th
2021	Ferrari SF21	(United Kingdom) Brendon Leigh	12	6	8	6	19	18	17	9	11	5	5	18	125	4th
2021	Ferrari SF21	(Italy) Domenico Lovece												11	125	4th
2022	Ferrari F1-75		BHR	EMI	GBR	RBR	BEL	NED	ITA	MEX	USA	JPN	BRA	UAE	79	7th
2022	Ferrari F1-75	(United Kingdom) Brendon Leigh	7	19	7	11		6	15	9	3	6	17	8	79	7th
2022	Ferrari F1-75	(Italy) David Tonizza		8		16	9		12	Ret				5	79	7th
2022	Ferrari F1-75	(Chile) Fabrizio Donoso	14		9		11	14			19	9	5		79	7th
2023–24	Ferrari SF-23		BHR	JED	RBR	GBR	BEL	NED	USA	MEX	BRA	LVG	QAT	UAE	253	1st
2023–24	Ferrari SF-23	(Iran) Bari Broumand	5	17	10	11	1	2	2	2	Ret	1	1	7	253	1st
2023–24	Ferrari SF-23	(France) Nicolas Longuet	3	8	6	2	13	20	18	5	13	2	2	5	253	1st
2023–24	Ferrari SF-23	(Hungary) Itsván Puki													253	1st
2025	Ferrari SF-25		AUS	CHN	BHR	SAU	GBR	BEL	NED	USA	MXC	SAP	QAT	ABU	207	2nd
2025	Ferrari SF-25	(Iran) Bari Broumand	16	Ret	1	13	7	15	1	2	2	12	1	3	207	2nd
2025	Ferrari SF-25	(France) Nicolas Longuet	7	7	14	7	4	12	5	9	6	9	2	6	207	2nd
2025	Ferrari SF-25	(United Kingdom) John Evans													207	2nd
2026	Ferrari SF-26		CHN	JPN	BHR	SAU	CAT	GBR	BEL	NED	USA	MXC	SAP	ABU	220	3rd
2026	Ferrari SF-26	(United Kingdom) John Evans	15	12	Ret	Ret	11	14							220	3rd
2026	Ferrari SF-26	(Spain) Ismael Fahssi	6	2	10	Ret	1	7	7	8	5	1	1	1	220	3rd
2026	Ferrari SF-26	(Iran) Bari Broumand							8	1	7	8	2	6	220	3rd

=== Privately entered Ferrari cars ===
(key)

Year	Entrant	Chassis	Engine	Tyres	Driver	1	2	3	4	5	6	7	8	9
1950						GBR	MON	500	SUI	BEL	FRA	ITA		
1950	Peter Whitehead	Ferrari 125	Ferrari 125 1.5 V12 s	D	(United Kingdom) Peter Whitehead		DNS				3	7		
1950	Clemente Biondetti	Ferrari 166S	Jaguar XK 3.4 L6	P	(Italy) Clemente Biondetti							Ret		
1951						SUI	500	BEL	FRA	GBR	GER	ITA	ESP	
1951	Peter Whitehead	Ferrari 125	Ferrari 125 1.5 V12 s	D	(United Kingdom) Peter Whitehead	Ret						Ret		
1951	Graham Whitehead	Ferrari 125	Ferrari 125 1.5 V12 s	D	(United Kingdom) Peter Whitehead				Ret					
1951	GA Vandervell	Ferrari 375 tw	Ferrari 375 4.5 V12	P	(United Kingdom) Reg Parnell				4					
1951	GA Vandervell	Ferrari 375 tw	Ferrari 375 4.5 V12	P	(United Kingdom) Brian Shawe-Taylor				DNS					
1951	GA Vandervell	Ferrari 375 tw	Ferrari 375 4.5 V12	P	(United Kingdom) Peter Whitehead					9				
1951	Francisco Landi	Ferrari 375	Ferrari 375 4.5 V12	P	(Brazil) Chico Landi							Ret		
1951	Ecurie Espadon	Ferrari 212	Ferrari 212 2.5 V12	P	(Switzerland) Rudi Fischer	11					6	DNS		
1952						SUI	500	BEL	FRA	GBR	GER	NED	ITA	
1952	Ecurie Espadon	Ferrari 500; Ferrari 212	Ferrari 500 2.0 L4; Ferrari 166 2.0 V12	P	(Switzerland) Rudi Fischer	2			11	13	3		Ret	
1952	Ecurie Espadon	Ferrari 500; Ferrari 212	Ferrari 500 2.0 L4; Ferrari 166 2.0 V12	P	(Switzerland) Peter Hirt	7			11	Ret				
1952	Ecurie Espadon	Ferrari 500; Ferrari 212	Ferrari 500 2.0 L4; Ferrari 166 2.0 V12	P	(Switzerland) Rudolf Schoeller						Ret			
1952	Ecurie Espadon	Ferrari 500; Ferrari 212	Ferrari 500 2.0 L4; Ferrari 166 2.0 V12	P	(Germany) Hans Stuck								DNQ	
1952	Ecurie Rosier	Ferrari 500; Ferrari 166/F2	Ferrari 500 2.0 L4; Ferrari 166 2.0 V12	D P	(France) Louis Rosier	Ret		Ret	Ret	DNA			10	
1952	Ecurie Rosier	Ferrari 500; Ferrari 166/F2	Ferrari 500 2.0 L4; Ferrari 166 2.0 V12	D P	(France) Maurice Trintignant	DNS								
1952	Grant Piston Ring/Agajanian	Ferrari 375S	Ferrari 375 4.5 V12	F	(United States) Johnnie Parsons		DNQ							
1952	Grant Piston Ring/Agajanian	Ferrari 375S	Ferrari 375 4.5 V12	F	(United States) Walt Faulkner		DNQ							
1952	Kennedy Tank	Ferrari 375S	Ferrari 375 4.5 V12	F	(United States) Johnny Mauro		DNQ							
1952	Howard Keck	Ferrari 375S	Ferrari 375 4.5 V12	F	(United States) Bobby Ball		DNQ							
1952	Ecurie Francorchamps	Ferrari 500	Ferrari 500 2.0 L4	E	(Belgium) Charles de Tornaco			7				Ret	DNQ	
1952	Ecurie Francorchamps	Ferrari 500	Ferrari 500 2.0 L4	E	(Belgium) Roger Laurent						6			
1952	Scuderia Marzotto	Ferrari 166/F2	Ferrari 166 2.0 V12	P	(Italy) Franco Comotti				12					
1952	Scuderia Marzotto	Ferrari 166/F2	Ferrari 166 2.0 V12	P	(Italy) Piero Carini				Ret		Ret			
1952	Peter Whitehead	Ferrari 125	Ferrari 166 2.0 V12	D	(United Kingdom) Peter Whitehead					10			DNQ	
1952	G Caprara	Ferrari 500	Ferrari 500 2.0 L4	D	(United Kingdom) Roy Salvadori					8				
1953						ARG	500	NED	BEL	FRA	GBR	GER	SUI	ITA
1953	Ecurie Rosier	Ferrari 500	Ferrari 500 2.0 L4	D E	(France) Louis Rosier			7	8	8	10	10	Ret	16
1953	Ecurie Francorchamps	Ferrari 500	Ferrari 500 2.0 L4	E	(Belgium) Jacques Swaters				DNS			7	Ret	
1953	Ecurie Francorchamps	Ferrari 500	Ferrari 500 2.0 L4	E	(Belgium) Charles de Tornaco				DNS					
1953	Ecurie Espadon	Ferrari 500; Ferrari 212	Ferrari 500 2.0 L4; Ferrari 166 2.0 V12	P	(Germany) Kurt Adolff							Ret		
1953	Ecurie Espadon	Ferrari 500; Ferrari 212	Ferrari 500 2.0 L4; Ferrari 166 2.0 V12	P	(Switzerland) Peter Hirt								Ret	
1953	Ecurie Espadon	Ferrari 500; Ferrari 212	Ferrari 500 2.0 L4; Ferrari 166 2.0 V12	P	(Switzerland) Max de Terra								8	
1954						ARG	500	BEL	FRA	GBR	GER	SUI	ITA	ESP
1954	Ecurie Rosier	Ferrari 500; Ferrari 625	Ferrari 500 2.0 L4; Ferrari 625 2.5 L4	D	(France) Louis Rosier	Ret			Ret	Ret	8			
1954	Ecurie Rosier	Ferrari 500; Ferrari 625	Ferrari 500 2.0 L4; Ferrari 625 2.5 L4	D	(France) Maurice Trintignant	4								
1954	Ecurie Rosier	Ferrari 500; Ferrari 625	Ferrari 500 2.0 L4; Ferrari 625 2.5 L4	D	(France) Robert Manzon				3	Ret	9		Ret	Ret
1954	Danny Oakes	Ferrari 375S	Ferrari 375 4.5 V12	F	(United States) Danny Oakes		DNQ							
1954	Ecurie Francorchamps	Ferrari 500	Ferrari 500 2.0 L4	E	(Belgium) Jacques Swaters			Ret				8		Ret
1954	Scuderia Ambrosiana	Ferrari 500	Ferrari 500 2.0 L4	A	(United Kingdom) Reg Parnell					Ret				
1955						ARG	MON	500	BEL	NED	GBR	ITA		
1955	Equipe Nationale Belge	Ferrari 625	Ferrari 625 2.5 L4	E	(Belgium) Johnny Claes					11				
1956						ARG	MON	500	BEL	FRA	GBR	GER	ITA	
1956	Giorgio Scarlatti	Ferrari 500	Ferrari 500 2.0 L4	P	(Italy) Giorgio Scarlatti		DNQ							
1956	Scuderia Centro Sud	Ferrari 500	Ferrari 500 2.0 L4	P	(Italy) Giorgio Scarlatti							Ret		
1957						ARG	MON	500	FRA	GBR	GER	PES	ITA	
1957	Scuderia Centro Sud	Ferrari 625	Ferrari 625 2.5 L4	P	(Argentina) Alejandro de Tomaso	9								
1961						MON	NED	BEL	FRA	GBR	GER	ITA	USA	
1961	FISA	Ferrari 156	Ferrari 178 1.5 V6	D	(Italy) Giancarlo Baghetti				1					
1961	Scuderia Sant Ambroeus	Ferrari 156	Ferrari 178 1.5 V6	D	(Italy) Giancarlo Baghetti					Ret		Ret^{F}		
1966						MON	BEL	FRA	GBR	NED	GER	ITA	USA	MEX
1966	Reg Parnell Racing	Ferrari 246	Ferrari 228 2.4 V6	D	(Italy) Giancarlo Baghetti							NC		

* Indicates shared drive

== See also ==
- Formula Abarth
- Formula Future Fiat
