= Aix-les-Bains Circuit du Lac =

Race track in Aix-les-Bains, Savoie, France

Coordinates: 45°41′29″N 5°53′42″E

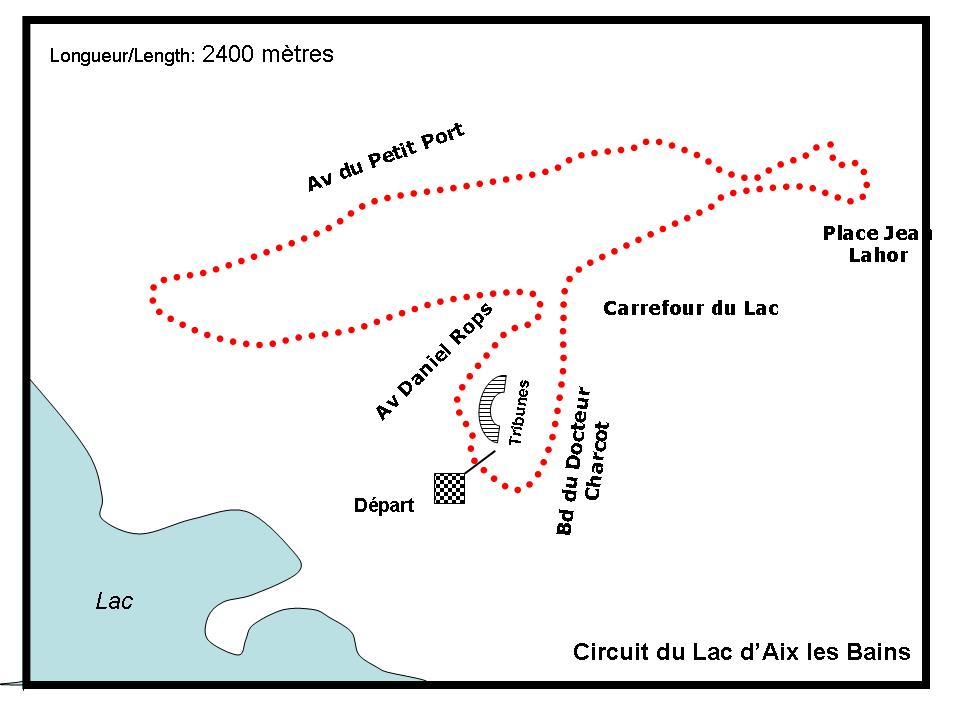

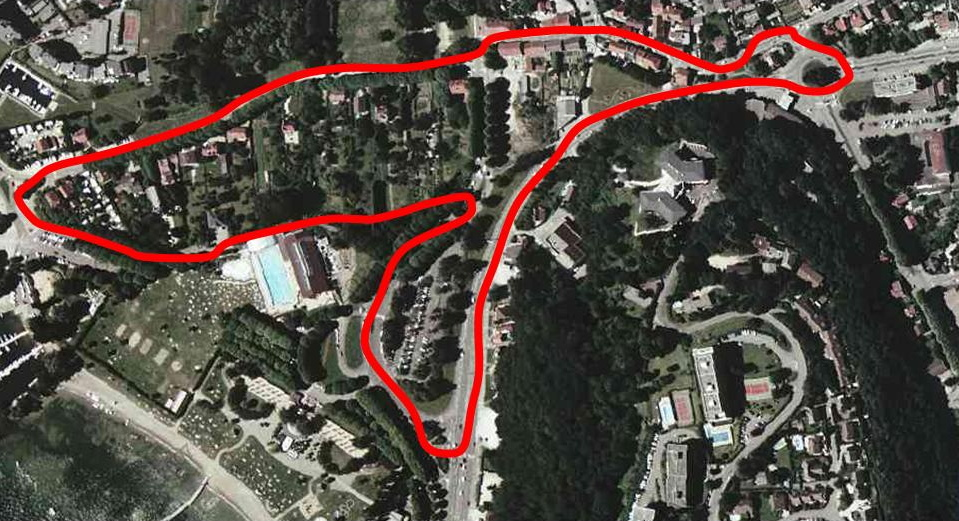

The Circuit du Lac was a race track in Aix-les-Bains, Savoie, France, which hosted Formula 2, Formula Junior, and Motorcycle Grand Prix races between 1949 and 1960.

== Introduction ==
The Circuit du Lac d'Aix-les-Bains (the lake race track) was in and nearby the Lac du Bourget next to the French commune of Aix-les-Bains. Its length, 2,400 m (1.5 mi), was typical of city race tracks. A slightly different track was reported to be in use in 1953. It was the sole race track in Savoie - the nearest others were Geneva's Circuit des Nations, Lausanne's Circuit du Léman, and at Lyon. Many drivers and spectators attended from neighboring Switzerland and Italy, and even from the UK.

== Racing events ==
=== Automobile ===
==== 1949 1st Grand Prix du Lac (Formula 2) ====
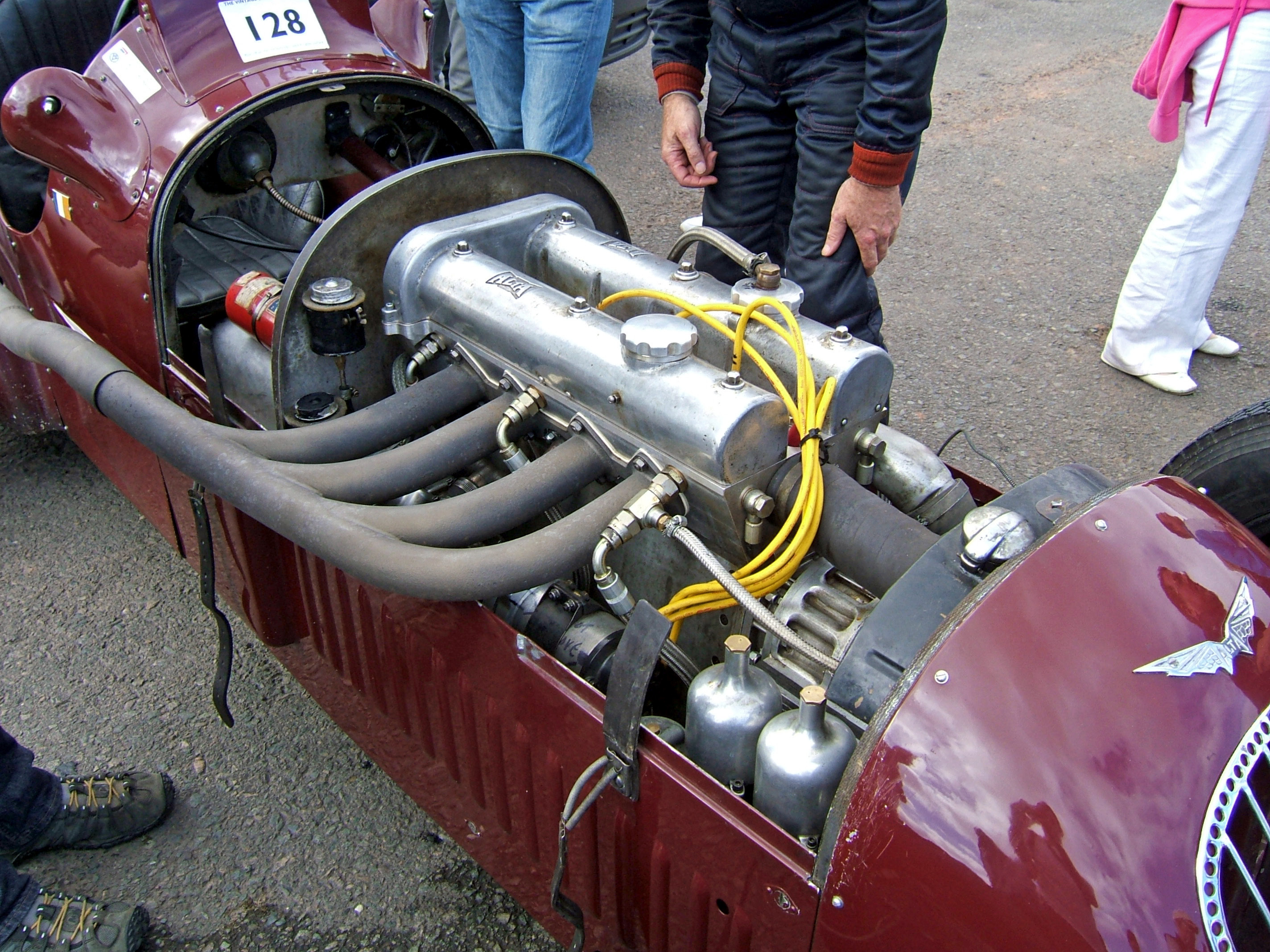
Alta Engine

- winner Eugène Martin with a Jicey-BMW,
- followed by Ernesto Tomqvist with a Simca Gordini T11
- and René Bonnet with a DB Citroën
- best lap: Maurice Trintignant, 1min 19sec

==== 1950 2nd Grand Prix du Lac (Formula 2) ====
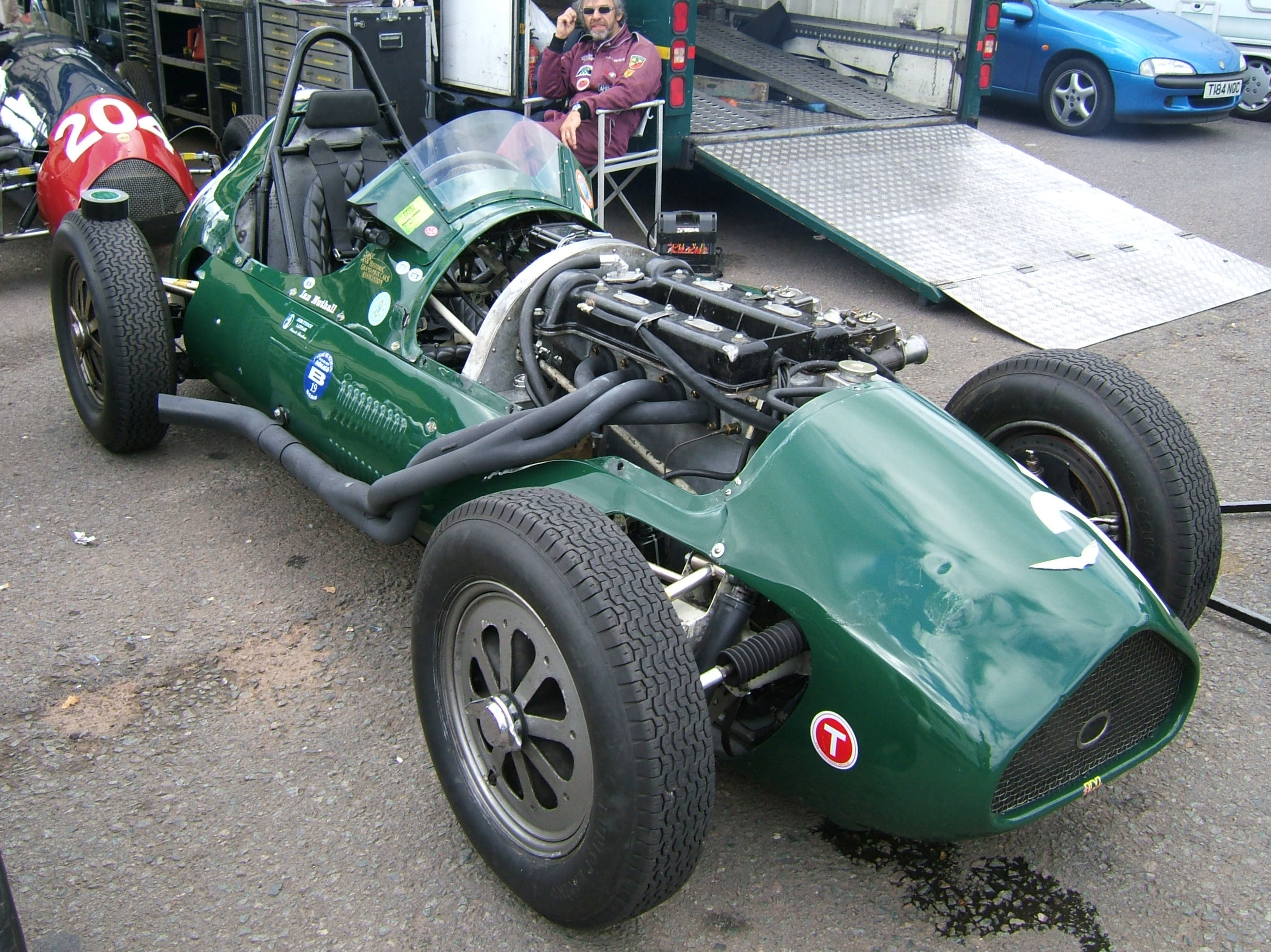
Alta F2

- winner Raymond Sommer with a Ferrari 166 F2,
- followed by André Simon with a Simca Gordini T16
- and Maurice Trintignant with a Simca Gordini T16
- best lap: Harry Schell, 1min 20sec .4"

==== 1951 3rd Grand Prix du Lac (Formula 2) ====
- winner Rudolf Fischer (CH) with a Ferrari 212/166,
- followed by Stirling Moss (GB) with an HWM Alta
- and André Simon with a Simca Gordini T16
- best lap: Rudolf Fischer, 1min 17sec .3"

==== 1952 4th Grand Prix du Lac (Formula 2) ====
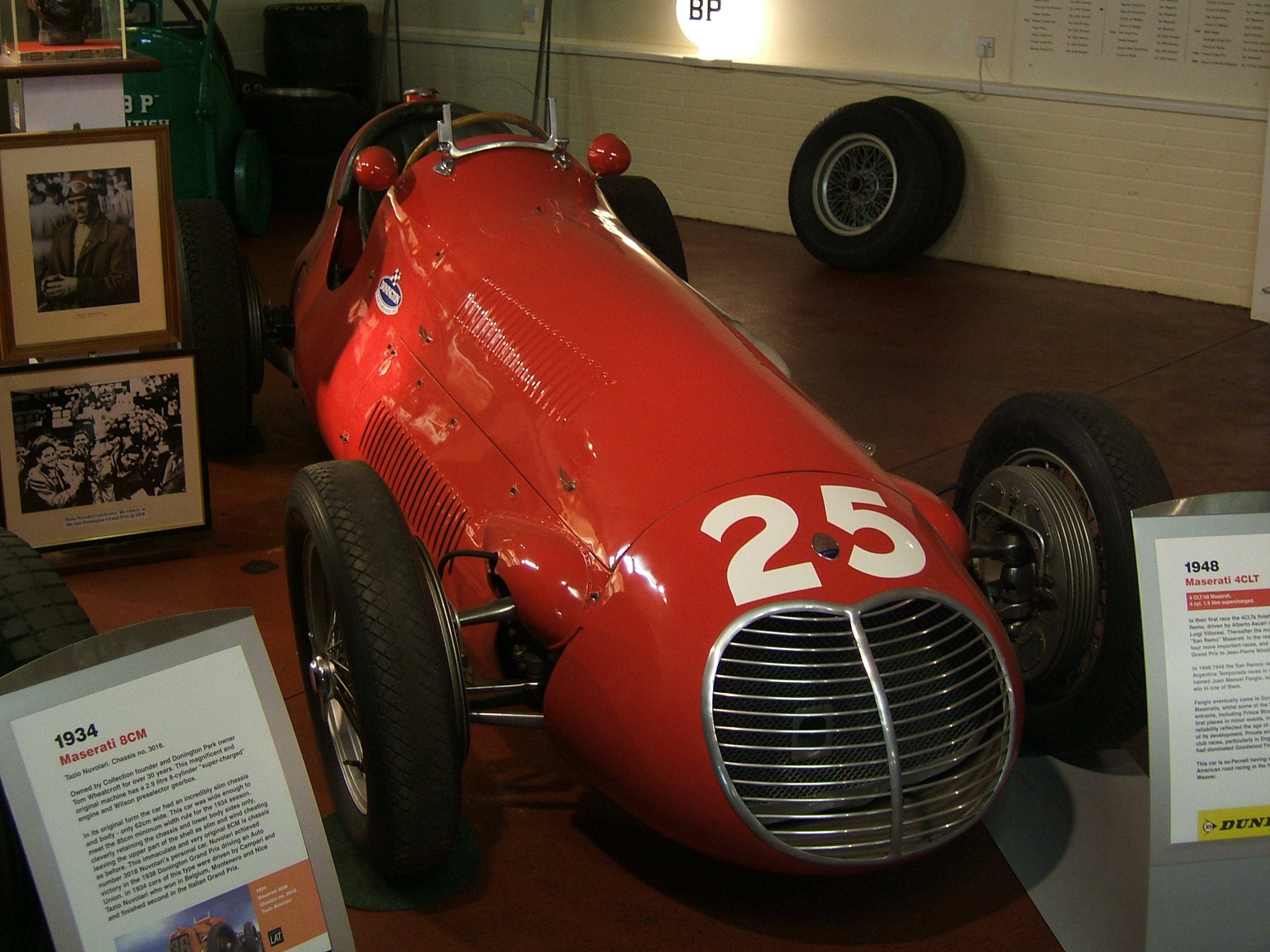
Maserati-Plate 4CLT/48

- winner Jean Behra with a Gordini T16,
- followed by Lance Macklin with an HWM Alta F2
- and Emmanuel de Graffenried with Maserati-Plate 4CLT/48
- best lap: Robert Manzon, 1min 36sec .4"

==== 1953 5th Grand Prix du Lac (Formula 2) ====
- winner Élie Bayol with an Osca 20,
- followed by Louis Rosier with a Ferrari 500
- and Lance Macklin with an HWM 53 Alta.
- best lap: Jean Behra, 1min 20sec

==== 1960 Circuit Prix du Lac (Formula junior) ====
- The race had to be stopped after the collapse, on the race track, of a bridgeway built for the media and the organizing committee. This led to the crash of the ELVA of Chris Threlfall in the remains of the structure, killing him on the spot as well as 4 other spectators. The race was cancelled without results being published.

This will be the last event on this race track....

=== Motorcycle ===
- In 1950: winner in 125cc : Jacques Vaque with MV Agusta, in 350cc : Georges Monneret with AJS, in 500cc : Nello Pagani, (Italy) with Gilera and in sidecar : Hans Haldemann / Josef Albisser, (Switzerland) with Norton.
- In 1951: winner in 350cc : Werner Gerber (Switzerland) on AJS, in 500cc : Werner Gerber (Switzerland) on Gilera and in sidecar : Eric Oliver / Lorenzo Dobelli, (UK/Italy) on Norton.

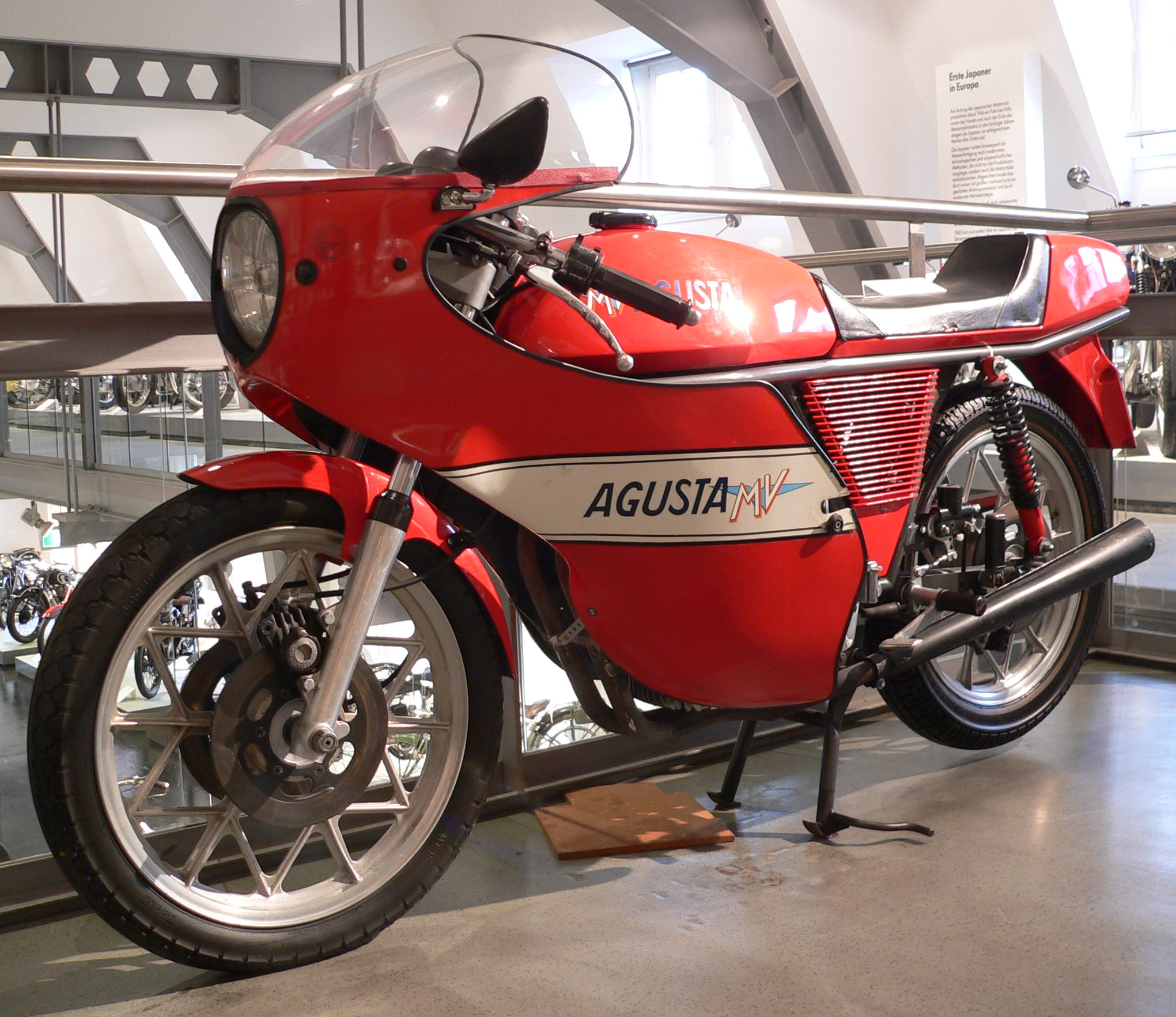
MV Agusta 350

- In 1952 : winner in 350cc : Werner Gerber (Switzerland) on AJS, in 500cc : Werner Gerber (Switzerland) on AJS and in sidecar : Jacques Drion / Bob Onslow, (UK) on Norton.
- In 1953 : winner in 175cc : Gaston Gaury on Morini, in 350cc : Pierre Monneret on AJS, in 500cc : Giuseppe Colnago, (Italy) on Gilera and in sidecar : Eric Oliver / Stan Dibben, (UK) on Norton.
- In 1954 : winner in 175cc : René Bétemps on MV Agusta, in 350cc : Luigi Taveri, (Switzerland) on Norton, in 500cc : Werner Gerber, (Switzerland) on Norton, and in sidecar : Hans Haldemann / Luigi Taveri, (Switzerland) on Norton.
- In 1955 : the accident in Le Mans will cause many event cancellations.
- In 1956 : new safety rules prevent old tracks being used without major safety modifications.
- In 1960 : the race is canceled because of a Formula Junior accident which happened four days earlier.
- In 1961 : the event is canceled.
