= Ferrari Tipo 500 =

1952–1953 Formula 2 racing car

Ferrari 500
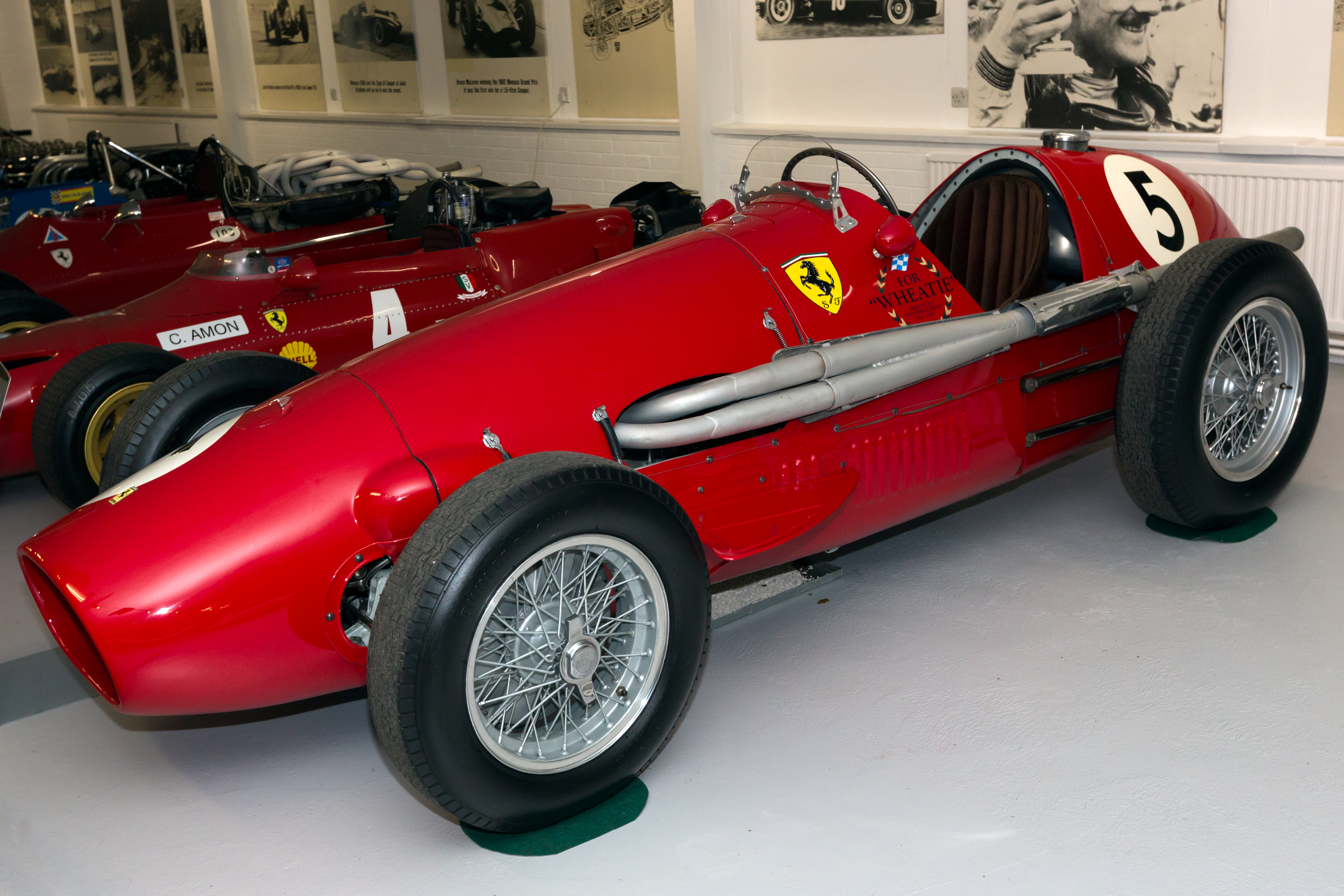
- Category: Formula Two
- Constructor: Ferrari
- Designer: Aurelio Lampredi
- Predecessor: 212
- Successor: 553

Technical specifications
- Chassis: Single-seater, tubular frame
- Suspension (front): Double wishbones, transverse semi-elliptic leaf spring, lever arm shock absorber
- Suspension (rear): De Dion axle, twin-trailing arms, transverse semi-elliptic leaf spring, lever arm shock absorber
- Axle track: Front: 1,308 mm (51.5 in); Rear: 1,245 mm (49.0 in)
- Wheelbase: 2,197 mm (86.5 in)
- Engine: Lampredi 1,984.86 cc (121.1 cu in) L4 naturally aspirated, front engine, longitudinally mounted
- Transmission: Ferrari 4-speed manual
- Weight: 560 kg (1,230 lb) dry
- Fuel: Shell
- Tyres: Pirelli; Dunlop; Englebert

Competition history
- Notable entrants: Scuderia Ferrari; Ecurie Rosier; Ecurie Francorchamps; Scuderia Centro Sud
- Notable drivers: (Italy) Alberto Ascari (Italy) Giuseppe Farina (United Kingdom) Mike Hawthorn
- Debut: 1952 Swiss Grand Prix
Races	Wins	Poles	F/Laps
19	14	13	12
- Drivers' Championships: 2
- Unless otherwise stated, all data refer to Formula One World Championship Grands Prix only.

The Ferrari 500 was a Formula 2 racing car designed by Aurelio Lampredi and used by Ferrari in 1952 and 1953, when the World Championship was run to F2 regulations.

== Racing history ==
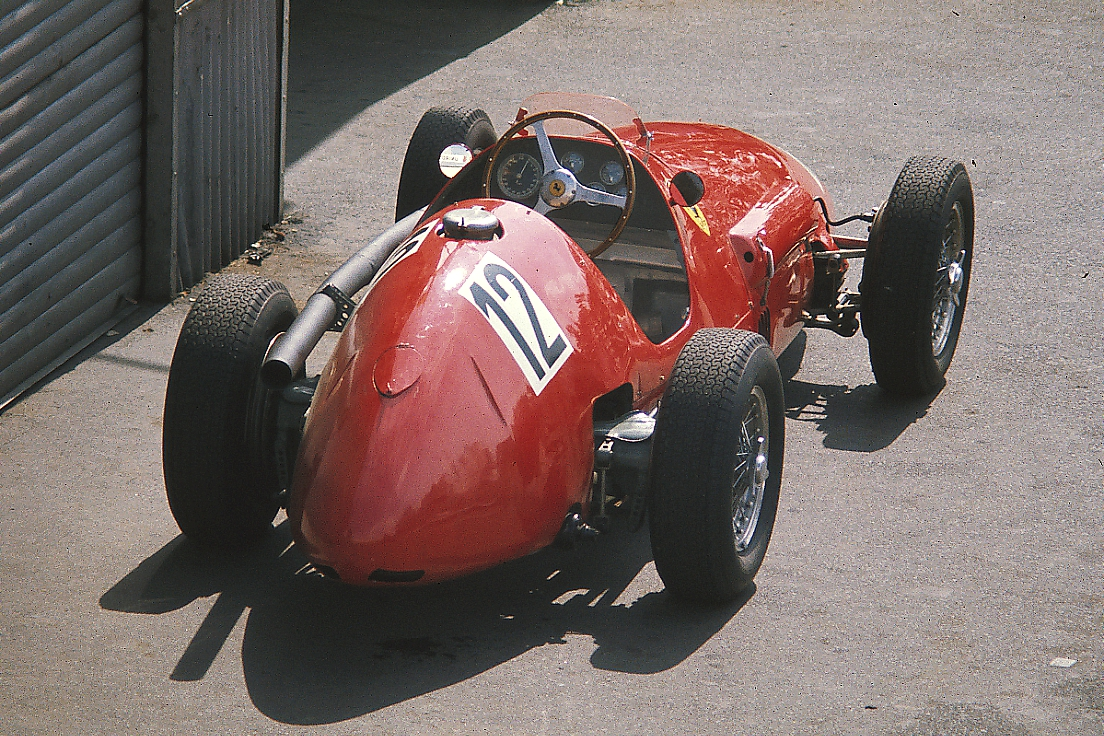

For 1952, the FIA announced that Grand Prix races counting towards the World Championship of Drivers would be run to Formula 2 specification rather than to Formula 1, after the withdrawal of Alfa Romeo from the sport. Ferrari were the only team to have a car specifically designed for the new formula. The car was powered by an inline four-cylinder engine which was mounted behind the front axle, improving weight distribution. Alberto Ascari used the car to win his first world championship, winning all but one race with the simple 500. The race he missed was because he was driving the 4.5-litre Ferrari at the Indianapolis 500, however Ferrari won the race he was absent from as well. The following season, Ascari won his second world championship, and Ferrari won all but the final race, which was won by Juan Manuel Fangio, back in racing after an accident which had damaged his neck.

Ascari won seven consecutive World Championship races in the 500, a record which stood until Sebastian Vettel broke it in 2013. If the 1953 Indianapolis 500 (which was run to a different formula, and in which Ascari was not entered) is discounted, the run is extended to nine.

== 625 F1 ==
For the 1954 season and the return to Formula One engine regulations, Ferrari 500 chassis were modified for the new regulations with the 2.5-litre 625 engine and would win two more races, one each in 1954 and 1955, although it was not quite fast enough compared to the Mercedes-Benz W196 and Maserati 250F. Despite two new models appearing during this period the 625 was not completely replaced until 1956 when Ferrari began using the D50 chassis Ferrari purchased along with the Lancia Formula One team. In May 1955, Maurice Trintignant had won the Monte Carlo GP for the first time for Ferrari.

The 625 F1 Lampredi inline-four engine displaced 2498.32 cc and could produce between 210–230 PS (154–169 kW; 207–227 hp) at 7000 rpm with two Weber 50DCO carburettors. The car had an independent front suspension and de Dion axle at the rear. Transverse leaf-springs and Houdaille hydraulic shock absorbers were used on both ends.

1954 Ferrari 625 F1

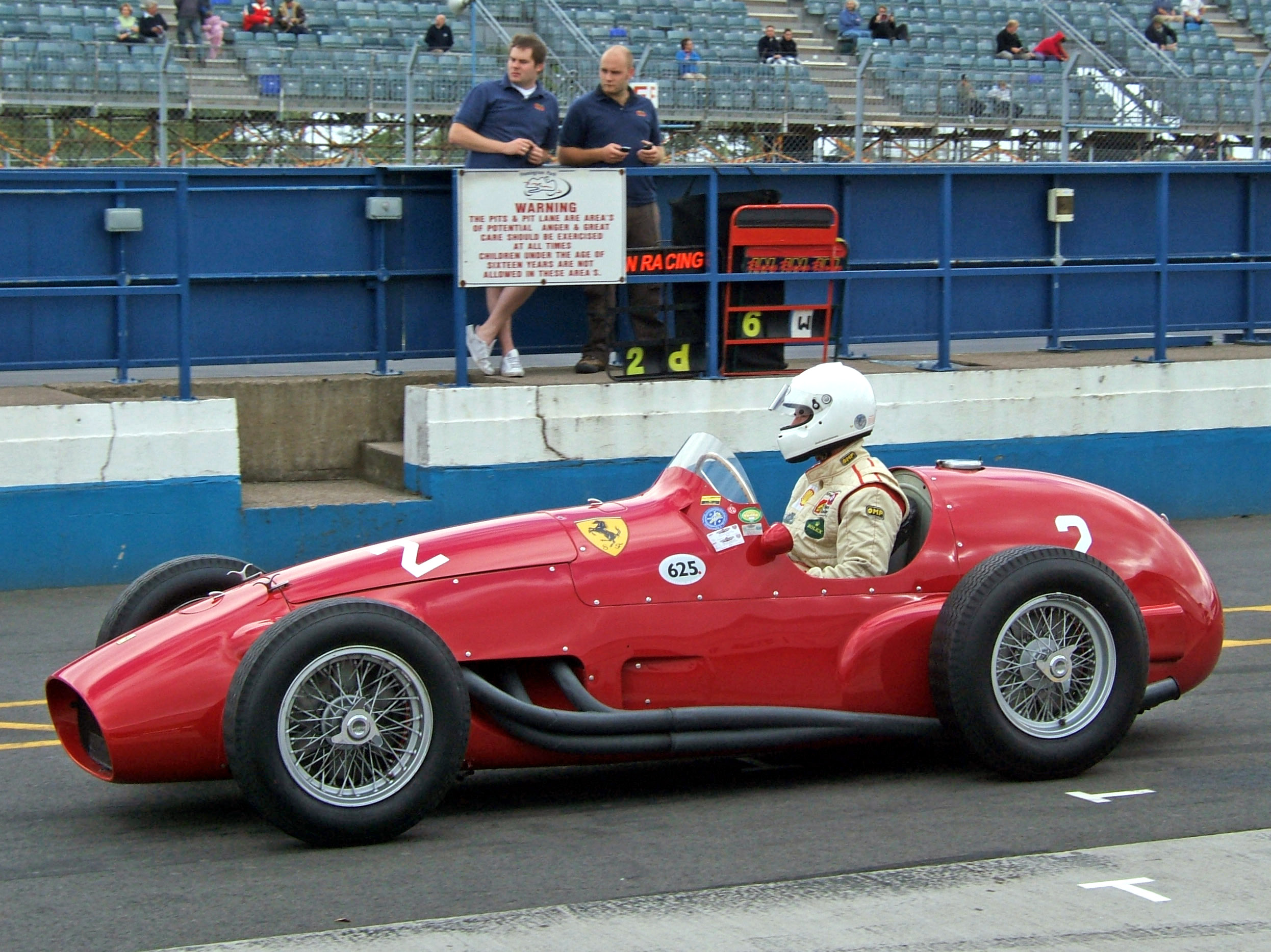

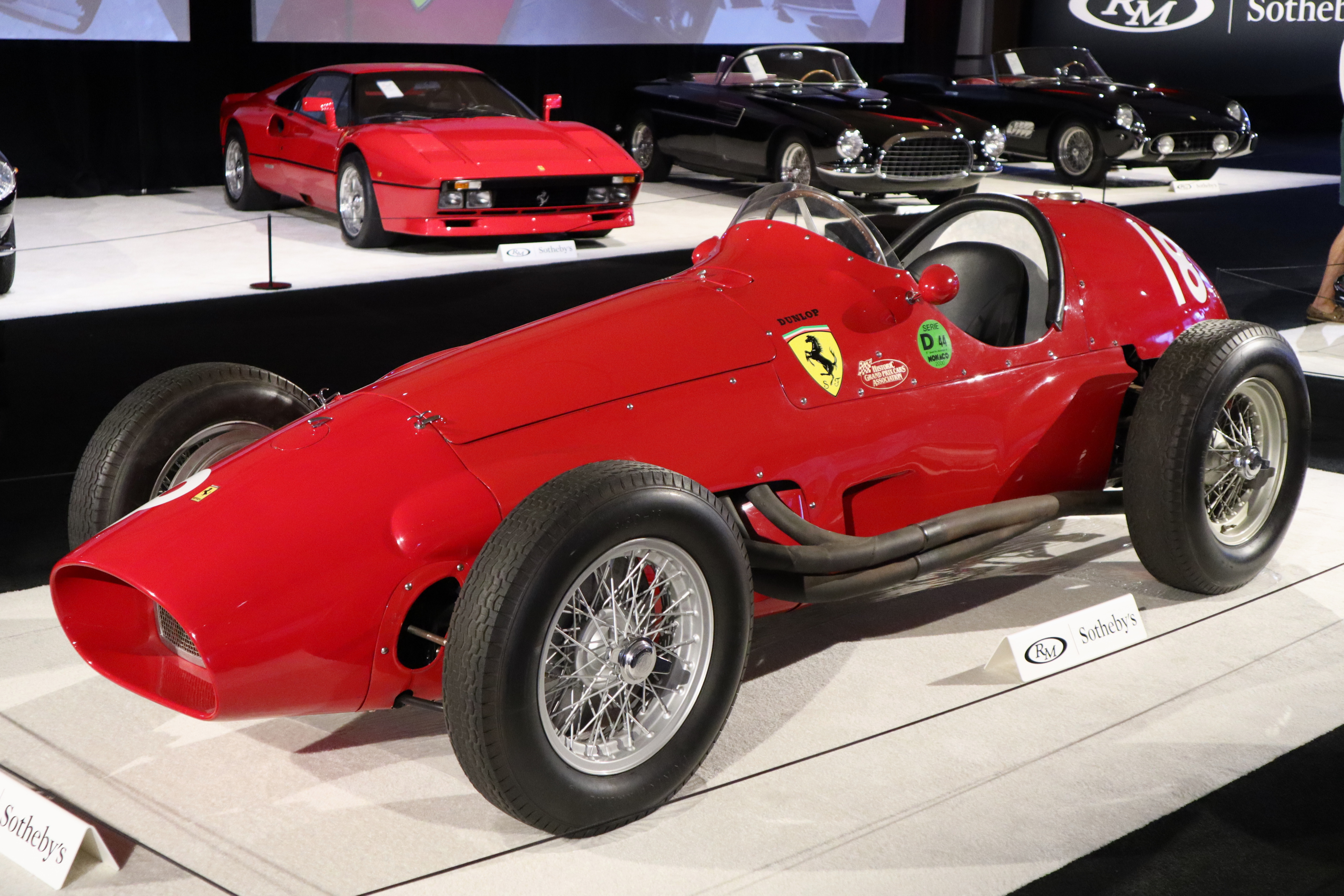

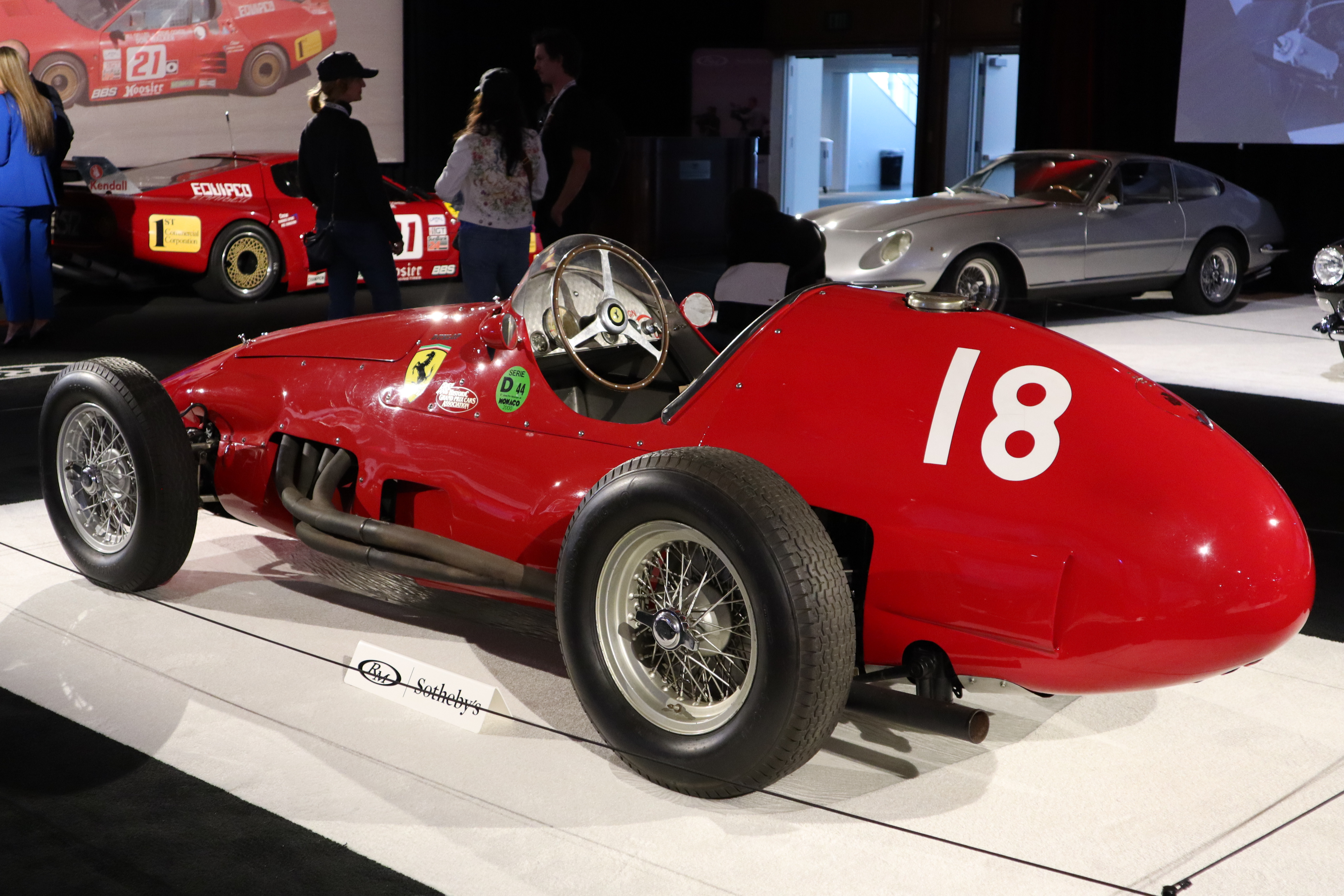

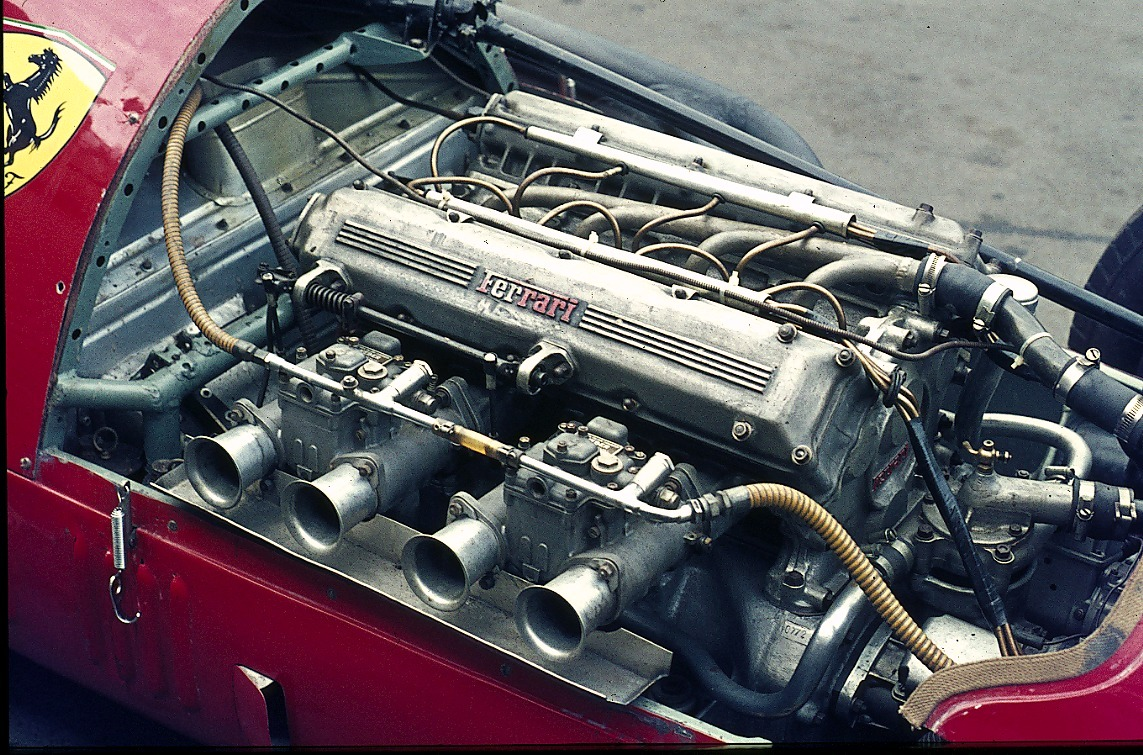

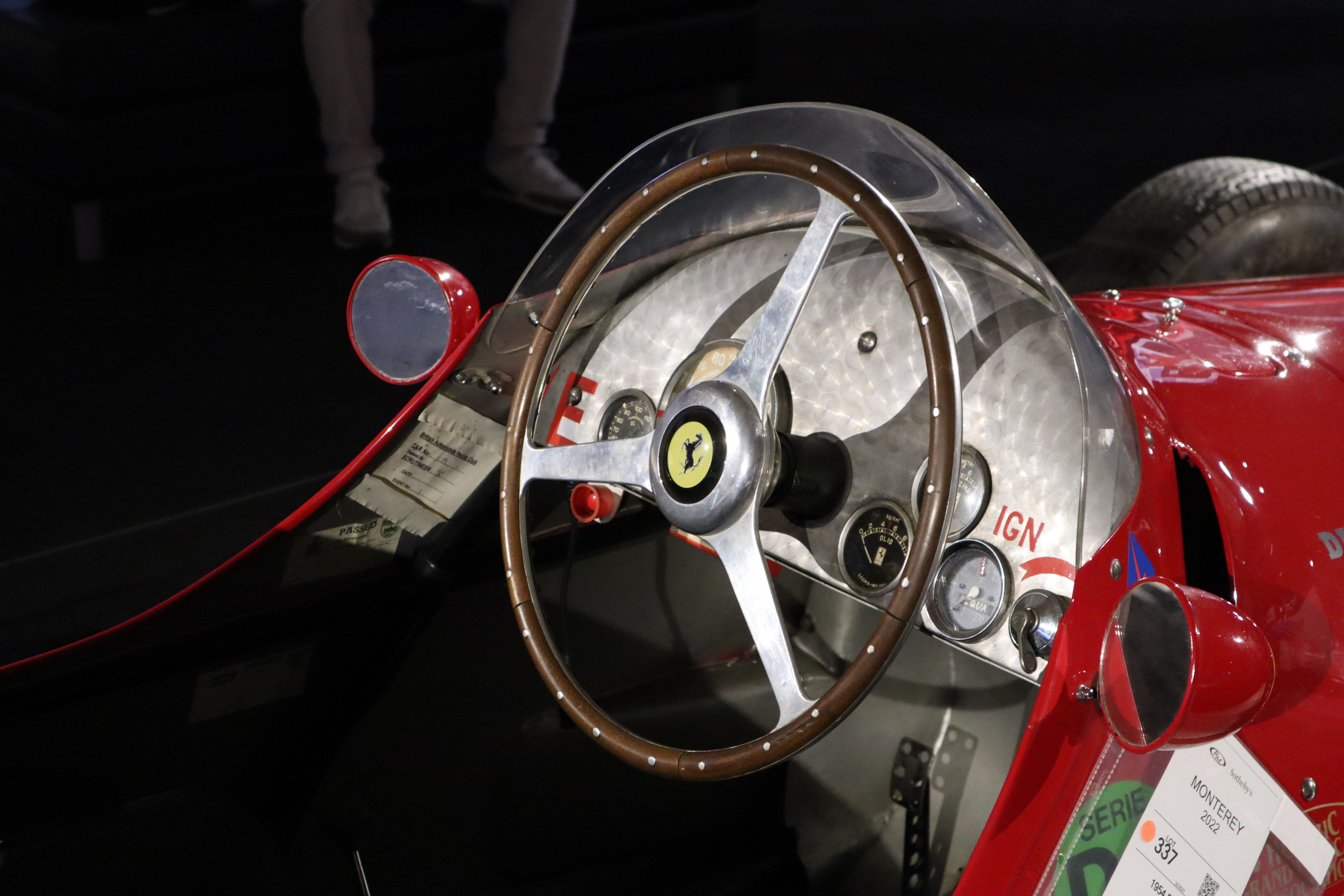

== Technical data ==
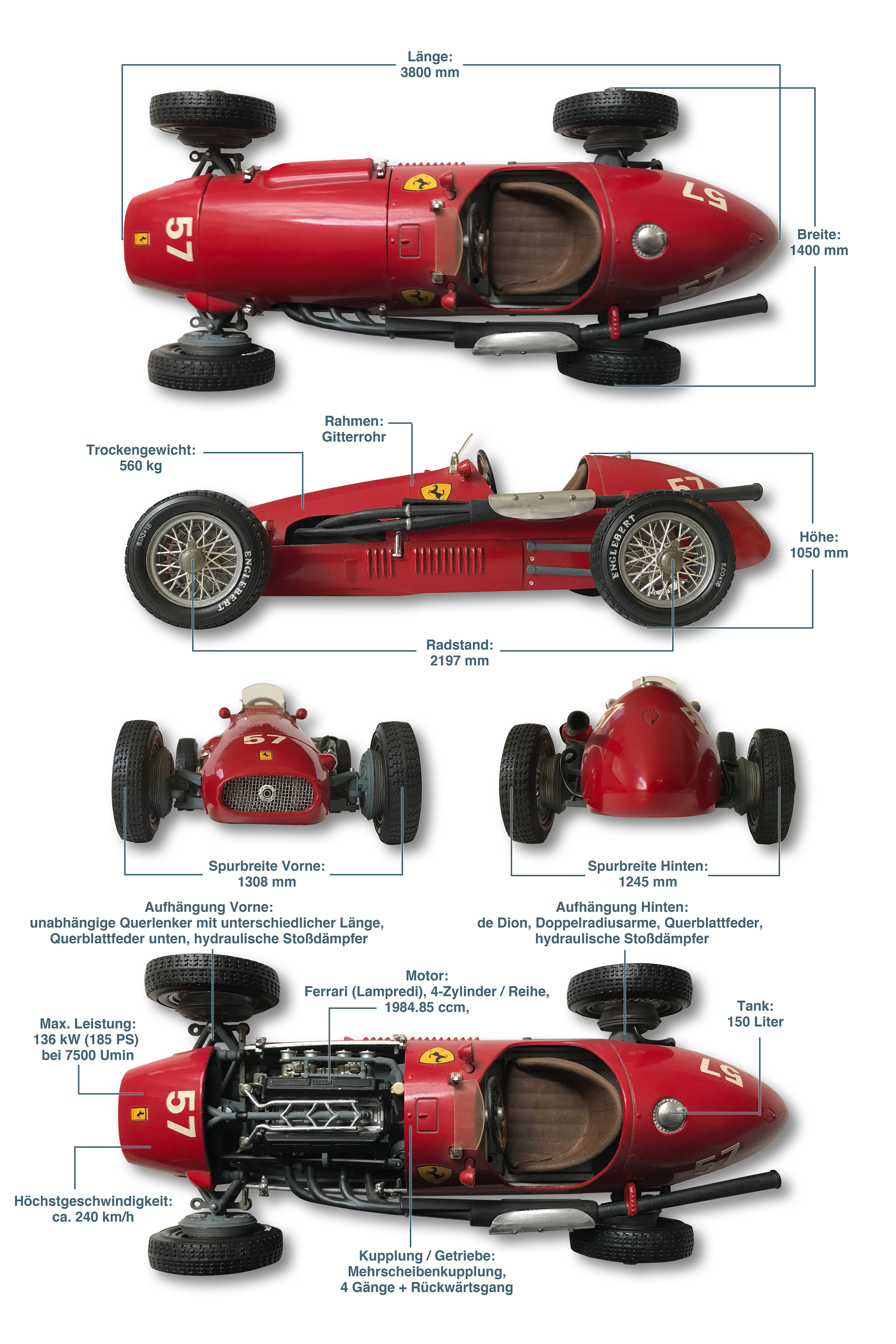
Basic technical information about the Ferrari 500 F2

Technical data	500 F2	625 F1
Engine:	Front mounted 4-cylinder in-line engine	
displacement:	1985 cm^{3}	2498 cm^{3}
Bore x stroke:	90 x 78 mm	94 x 90 mm
Compression:	13.0:1	
Max power at rpm:	185 hp at 7 500 rpm	210 hp at 7 000 rpm
Valve control:	Double Overhead Camshafts, 2 valves per cylinder	
Carburetor:	2 Weber 50 DCO	
Gearbox:	4-speed manual, transaxle	
suspension front:	Double cross links, transverse leaf spring	
suspension rear:	De Dion axle, double longitudinal links, transverse leaf spring	
Brakes:	Hydraulic drum brakes	
Chassis & body:	Oval tube frame with aluminum body	
Wheelbase:	216 cm	
Dry weight:	560 kg	600 kg
Top speed:	260 km/h	270 km/h

== Partial Formula One World Championship results ==
(This table contains results of Ferrari works cars; privateer results can be found here)

(key) (results in bold indicate pole position; results in italics indicate fastest lap)

Year		Chassis	Engine	Tyres	Driver	1	2	3	4	5	6	7	8	9	Points	WCC
1952						SUI	500	BEL	FRA	GBR	GER	NED	ITA		n/a^{1}	n/a^{1}
1952	Scuderia Ferrari	500	500 2.0 L4	P	Giuseppe Farina	**Ret/** **Ret^{2}**		2	2	**6**	2	2	4		n/a^{1}	n/a^{1}
1952	Scuderia Ferrari	500	500 2.0 L4	P	Piero Taruffi	1		Ret	3	2	4		7		n/a^{1}	n/a^{1}
1952	Scuderia Ferrari	500	500 2.0 L4	P	Andre Simon	Ret^{2}							6		n/a^{1}	n/a^{1}
1952	Scuderia Ferrari	500	500 2.0 L4	P	Alberto Ascari			**1**	**1**	1	**1**	**1**	**1**		n/a^{1}	n/a^{1}
1952	Scuderia Ferrari	500	500 2.0 L4	P	Luigi Villoresi							3	3		n/a^{1}	n/a^{1}
1953						ARG	500	NED	BEL	FRA	GBR	GER	SUI	ITA	n/a^{1}	n/a^{1}
1953	Scuderia Ferrari	500	500 2.0 L4	P	Giuseppe Farina	Ret		2	Ret	5	3	1	2	2	n/a^{1}	n/a^{1}
1953	Scuderia Ferrari	500	500 2.0 L4	P	Alberto Ascari	**1**		**1**	1	**4**	**1**	**8** ^{2}	1	**Ret**	n/a^{1}	n/a^{1}
1953	Scuderia Ferrari	500	500 2.0 L4	P	Mike Hawthorn	4		4	6	1	5	3	3	4	n/a^{1}	n/a^{1}
1953	Scuderia Ferrari	500	500 2.0 L4	P	Luigi Villoresi	2		Ret	2	6	Ret	8 ^{2}	6	3	n/a^{1}	n/a^{1}
1954						ARG	500	BEL	FRA	GBR	GER	SUI	ITA	ESP	n/a^{1}	n/a^{1}
1954	Scuderia Ferrari	625	625 2.5 L4	P	José Froilán González	3		4 ^{2}		2	5	**1**	3 ^{2}		n/a^{1}	n/a^{1}
1954	Scuderia Ferrari	625	625 2.5 L4	P	Mike Hawthorn	DSQ		4 ^{2}		3	2	6	2		n/a^{1}	n/a^{1}
1954	Scuderia Ferrari	625	625 2.5 L4	P	Giuseppe Farina	**2**									n/a^{1}	n/a^{1}
1954	Scuderia Ferrari	625	625 2.5 L4	P	Umberto Maglioli	9							3 ^{2}		n/a^{1}	n/a^{1}
1954	Scuderia Ferrari	625	625 2.5 L4	P	Piero Taruffi						13				n/a^{1}	n/a^{1}
1954	Scuderia Ferrari	625	625 2.5 L4	P	Alberto Ascari								Ret		n/a^{1}	n/a^{1}
1954	Scuderia Ferrari	625	625 2.5 L4	P	Maurice Trintignant			2	Ret	8	7	4	5	8	n/a^{1}	n/a^{1}
1954	Ecurie Rosier	625	625 2.5 L4	P	Maurice Trintignant	4									n/a^{1}	n/a^{1}
1954	Ecurie Rosier	625	625 2.5 L4	P	Robert Manzon				3	15	12		Ret	17	n/a^{1}	n/a^{1}
1954	Ecurie Rosier	625	625 2.5 L4	P	Louis Rosier				Ret	31	18				n/a^{1}	n/a^{1}
1954	Owen Racing Organisation	625	625 2.5 L4	D	Ken Wharton				Ret						n/a^{1}	n/a^{1}
1954	Ecurie Francorchamps	625	625 2.5 L4	E	Jacques Swaters			14		DNA					n/a^{1}	n/a^{1}
1954	Ecurie Francorchamps	500	500 2.0 L4	E	Jacques Swaters							16		Ret	n/a^{1}	n/a^{1}
1954	Scuderia Ambrosiana	500	500 2.0 L4	A	Reg Parnell					14					n/a^{1}	n/a^{1}
1955						ARG	MON	500	BEL	NED	GBR	ITA			n/a^{1}	n/a^{1}
1955	Scuderia Ferrari	625	625 2.5 L4	E	Giuseppe Farina	**2** ^{2}	4								n/a^{1}	n/a^{1}
1955	Scuderia Ferrari	625	625 2.5 L4	E	Maurice Trintignant	**2** ^{2}					Ret				n/a^{1}	n/a^{1}
1955	Scuderia Ferrari	625	625 2.5 L4	E	José Froilán González	**2** ^{2}									n/a^{1}	n/a^{1}
1955	Scuderia Ferrari	625	625 2.5 L4	E	Umberto Maglioli	3 ^{2}									n/a^{1}	n/a^{1}
1955	Scuderia Ferrari	625	625 2.5 L4	E	Eugenio Castellotti						6 ^{2}				n/a^{1}	n/a^{1}
1955	Scuderia Ferrari	625	625 2.5 L4	E	Mike Hawthorn						6 ^{2}				n/a^{1}	n/a^{1}
1955	Equipe Nationale Belge	625	625 2.5 L4	E	Johnny Claes					11					n/a^{1}	n/a^{1}
1956						ARG	MON	500	BEL	FRA	GBR	GER	ITA		n/a^{1}	n/a^{1}
1956	Giorgio Scarlatti	500	500 2.0 L4	P	Giorgio Scarlatti		DNQ					Ret			n/a^{1}	n/a^{1}

- 1 – The Constructors' World Championship did not exist before 1958.
- 2 – Shared Drive.
