= List of future stadiums =

The following is a list of stadiums that are either proposed or under construction, with "stadium" defined as a venue that can accommodate sports traditionally held outdoors. The list does not include indoor arenas under construction, some of which can be found at List of indoor arenas by capacity. Entirely new stadiums under construction on the same site as a demolished former stadium, plus those planned to be built on the site of a current stadium, are included. However, expansions to already-existing stadiums are not included, and neither are recently constructed venues which have opened, even though construction continues on part of the stadium.

== List ==
List of future stadiums sorted by seating capacity
Stadium	Capacity	City	Country	Tenant(s)	Opening	Notes
VinFast – Trong Dong Stadium	135,000	Hanoi	Vietnam		2027	
Hassan II Stadium	115,000	Benslimane	Morocco	Morocco national football team	2028	
New Trafford Stadium	100,000	Trafford	England	Manchester United F.C.	TBD	
New MCA Cricket Stadium	100,000	Navi Mumbai	India	Mumbai cricket team	TBD	
King Salman International Stadium	92,760	Riyadh	Saudi Arabia	Saudi Arabia national football team	2029	
New Broncos Stadium	80,000	Denver	United States	Denver Broncos	2031	
Bengaluru International Cricket Stadium	80,000	Bengaluru	India		TBD	
Anil Agarwal Stadium	75,000	Jaipur	India	Rajasthan cricket team, Rajasthan Royals	TBD	
Guangzhou Football Park	74,707	Guangzhou	China		2028	
New CR Flamengo Stadium	72,000	Rio de Janeiro	Brazil	CR Flamengo	2036	
Generali Stadium	71,500	Milan	Italy	AC Milan, Inter Milan	2031	
Nou Mestalla	70,044	Valencia	Spain	Valencia CF	2027	
Rach Chiec Central Stadium	70,000	Ho Chi Minh City	Vietnam		TBD	
New National Stadium	70,000	Tbilisi	Georgia	Georgia national football team	2028	
New Huntington Bank Field	67,500	Brook Park	United States	Cleveland Browns	2029	
New Stadium at RFK Campus	65,000	Washington, D.C.	United States	Washington Commanders	2030	
New Chiefs Stadium	65,000	Kansas City, Kansas	United States	Kansas City Chiefs	2031	
Leazes Park Stadium	65,000	Newcastle	England	Newcastle United F.C.	TBD	
Nuevo Estadio Tigres	65,000	San Nicolás	Mexico	Tigres UANL	TBD	
Brisbane Stadium	63,000	Brisbane	Australia	2032 Summer Olympics, Brisbane Lions, Brisbane Heat	2032	
Addis Ababa National Stadium	62,000	Addis Ababa	Ethiopia	Ethiopia national football team	2027	
New Birmingham City Stadium	62,000	Birmingham	England	Birmingham City F.C.	2030	
Yellow River Sports Center	61,000	Jinan	China	Shandong Taishan F.C.	2026	
New AS Roma Stadium	60,605	Rome	Italy	A.S. Roma	2029	
Yuhang International Sports Center	60,000	Hangzhou	China		2027	
Raila Odinga International Stadium	60,000	Nairobi	Kenya	FC Talanta	2027	
New Nissan Stadium	60,000	Nashville	United States	Tennessee Titans	2027	
New Hamburg Olympic Stadium	60,000	Hamburg	Germany	Hamburger SV	TBD	
Tajiat Olympic Stadium (Baghdad Sports City)	60,000	Tajiat	Iraq		TBD	
PVF Stadium	60,000	Hung Yen	Vietnam	Cong An Nhan Dan F.C.	2027	
Chicago Bears Stadium	60,000	Hammond	United States	Chicago Bears	2031	
New Estadio El Campín	60,000	Bogotá	Colombia	Millonarios F.C., Independiente Santa Fe	2028	
Aw Abadir Stadium	56,000	Harar	Ethiopia	Harar City F.C.	TBD	
New Hertha Stadium	55,137	Berlin	Germany	Hertha BSC	TBD	
New Ramón Sánchez-Pizjuán Stadium	55,000	Seville	Spain	Sevilla FC	2028	
New Tashkent Stadium	55,000	Tashkent	Uzbekistan	Uzbekistan national football team	2027	
New İzmir Atatürk Stadium	55,000	İzmir	Turkey		TBD	
New National Stadium	52,000	Belgrade	Serbia	Serbia national football team	2027	
New América Stadium	52,000	Cali	Colombia	América de Cali	2027	
New Ankara Stadium	51,200	Ankara	Turkey		2026	
National Cricket Ground	50,000	Dhaka	Bangladesh	Bangladesh national cricket team, Dhaka Capitals	2026	
New Sétif Stadium	50,000	Sétif	Algeria	ES Sétif	TBD	
New Tsukiji Stadium	50,000	Tokyo	Japan	Yomiuri Giants	2032	
Estadio Nacional de El Salvador	50,000	San Salvador	El Salvador	El Salvador national football team	2027	
New Constantine Stadium	50,000	Constantine	Algeria	CS Constantine	2028	
South Riyadh Stadium	47,060	Riyadh	Saudi Arabia		2032	
Prince Mohammed bin Salman Stadium	46,979	Riyadh	Saudi Arabia	Al Hilal SFC, Al Nassr FC	2027	
New San Lorenzo Stadium	46,264	Buenos Aires	Argentina	San Lorenzo de Almagro	TBD	
Aramco Stadium	46,096	Khobar	Saudi Arabia	Al Qadsiah FC	2032	
Qiddiya Coast Stadium	46,096	Jeddah	Saudi Arabia		2032	
New Murabba Stadium	46,010	Riyadh	Saudi Arabia		2032	
ROSHN Stadium	46,000	Riyadh	Saudi Arabia		2032	
Jeddah Central Development Stadium	45,794	Jeddah	Saudi Arabia		2032	
King Abdullah Economic City Stadium	45,700	Jeddah	Saudi Arabia		2032	
Al-Hussein bin Abdullah II International Stadium	45,000	Amra City	Jordan		2029	
New Cruz Azul Stadium	45,000	Mexico City	Mexico	Cruz Azul	TBD	
New Shah Alam Stadium	45,000	Shah Alam	Malaysia	Selangor F.C.	2029	
Taiwan Super Dome	45,000	Taichung City	Republic of China		2030	
New Málaga Stadium	45,000	Málaga	Spain	Málaga CF	TBD	
Nuevo Romareda	43,184	Zaragoza	Spain	Real Zaragoza	2027	
New Memorial Stadium	43,000	Lawrence	United States	Kansas Jayhawks football	2027	
Vodafone Stadium	42,000	Cairo	Egypt	Al Ahly SC	2029	
Nea Toumba Stadium	41,926	Thessaloniki	Greece	PAOK	TBD	
Olympic Stadium	41,508	Rinas	Albania	Albanian National Olympic Committee	TBD	
New Club Brugge Stadium	40,116	Bruges	Belgium	Club Brugge KV	2028	
Kabul International Cricket Stadium	40,000	Kabul	Afghanistan		TBD	
Sportech City Stadium	40,000	Cádiz	Spain	Cádiz CF	2031	
Hùng Vương Olympic Stadium	40,000	Hanoi	Vietnam		2028	
New Stade Rennais Stadium	40,000	Rennes	France	Stade Rennais F.C.	TBD	
New Panathinaikos Stadium	40,000	Athens	Greece	Panathinaikos	2027	
Estadio Ciudad UdeG	40,000	Zapopan	Mexico	Atlas FC, Leones Negros UdeG	2030	
USF Football Stadium	35,000	Tampa	United States	South Florida Bulls football	2027	
New Almaty Stadium	35,000	Almaty	Kazakhstan	FC Kairat	2028	
Shymkent Stadium	35,000	Shymkent	Kazakhstan	FC Ordabasy	2028	
New Bologna Stadium	35,000	Bologna	Italy	Bologna FC 1909	2031	
ACA International Cricket Stadium	34,000	Amaravati	India	Andhra cricket team	2026	
New Maksimir Stadium	34,000	Zagreb	Croatia	Dinamo Zagreb	2029	
New Kansas City Royals Stadium	34,000	Kansas City, Missouri	United States	Kansas City Royals	2030	
Futeca District	34,000	Guatemala City	Guatemala	Guatemala national football team	TBD	
New Las Vegas Stadium	33,000	Las Vegas	United States	Las Vegas Athletics	2028	
Aktobe Stadium	33,000	Aktobe	Kazakhstan	FC Aktobe	TBD	
Babil Stadium	32,200	Hillah	Iraq	Al-Qasim SC, Babylon SC	TBD	
New Dan Păltinișanu Stadium	32,150	Timișoara	Romania	SSU Politehnica Timișoara	2028	
New Arechi Stadium	32,000	Salerno	Italy	US Salernitana 1919	2032	
Ammo Baba Stadium	31,200	Baghdad	Iraq		TBD	
New Rays Ballpark	31,000	Tampa	United States	Tampa Bay Rays	2029	
New Aloha Stadium	31,000	Honolulu	United States	Hawaii Rainbow Warriors football	2029	
Arena Vila Belmiro	30,108	Santos	Brazil	Santos FC	TBD	
Tessema Stadium	30,000	Casablanca	Morocco	Raja CA	2027	
New Jamsil Baseball Stadium	30,000	Seoul	South Korea	Doosan Bears, LG Twins	2032	
New Stadio Verona	30,000	Verona	Italy	Hellas Verona F.C.	2031	
New Casement Park	30,000	Belfast	Northern Ireland		TBD	
New Youth Park Stadium	30,000	Split	Croatia	Hajduk Split	TBD	
New National Stadium	30,000	Drenas	Kosovo	Kosovo national football team	TBD	
Al Sunbula Stadium	30,000	Diwaniyah	Iraq	Al-Diwaniya FC	TBD	
Salah Al Din Stadium	30,000	Tikrit	Iraq	Salahaddin FC	TBD	
Diyala Stadium	30,000	Baqubah	Iraq	Diyala FC	TBD	
Mosul International Stadium	30,000	Mosul	Iraq	Mosul FC	TBD	
New Aalborg Stadium	30,000	Aalborg	Denmark	AaB	TBD	
New Mohammed Al Hamad Stadium	30,000	Kuwait City	Kuwait	Qadsia SC	TBD	
Varanasi Cricket Stadium	30,000	Varanasi	India		2026	
New Georgi Asparuhov Stadium	27,826	Sofia	Bulgaria	PFC Levski Sofia	TBD	
Cagliari Arena	25,200	Cagliari	Italy	Cagliari Calcio	2032	
Stadionul Dinamo	25,059	Bucharest	Romania	Dinamo București	2028	
New Brescia Stadium	25,000	Brescia	Italy		TBD	
New Béchar Stadium	25,000	Béchar	Algeria	JS Saoura	2027	
Etihad Park	25,000	New York	United States	New York City FC	2027	
New Revolution Stadium	25,000	Everett	United States	New England Revolution	TBD	
Zanzibar Sports City Stadium	25,000	Fumba	Tanzania		TBD	
Power Court Stadium	25,000	Luton	England	Luton Town F.C.	2028	
New Hornet Stadium	25,000	Sacramento	United States	Sacramento State Hornets football	TBD	
New Iași Municipal Stadium	24,179	Iași	Romania	FC Politehnica Iași	TBD	
Breybourne Cricket Stadium	24,000	Oswego	United States		TBD	
Stade Louis Nicollin	24,000	Montpellier	France	Montpellier HSC	TBD	
Skovens Arena	24,000	Aarhus	Denmark	AGF	2027	
Macquarie Point Stadium	23,000	Hobart	Australia	Tasmania Football Club, Hobart Hurricanes	2031	
New Riyadh Stadium	22,500	Riyadh	Saudi Arabia		2027	
Arena Ponte Preta	22,204	Campinas	Brazil	Ponte Preta	TBD	
McDonald's Park	22,000	Chicago	United States	Chicago Fire FC	2028	
New Adelaide United Stadium	22,000	Adelaide	Australia	Adelaide United FC	TBD	
Arena Varna	22,000	Varna	Bulgaria	PFC Cherno More Varna	TBD	
New Denizli Stadium	22,000	Denizli	Turkey	Denizlispor	TBD	
New Ruch Stadium	22,000	Chorzów	Poland	Ruch Chorzów	TBD	
New Partenio-Lombardi Stadium	21,500	Avellino	Italy	U.S. Avellino 1912	TBD	
Starfield Cheongna Dome	21,000	Incheon	South Korea	SSG Landers	2028	
New Stadio Tardini	20,986	Parma	Italy	Parma Calcio 1913	2027	
ZebrArena Charleroi	20,219	Charleroi	Belgium	Sporting Charleroi	2027	
New Jahn-Sportpark	20,000	Berlin	Germany	BFC Dynamo	2028	
Ashdod Municipal	20,000	Ashdod	Israel	F.C. Ashdod	TBD	
Sabha International Stadium	20,000	Sabha	Libya		TBD	
Railyards Stadium	20,000	Sacramento	United States	Sacramento Republic FC	2028	
Eleven Park	20,000	Indianapolis	United States	Indy Eleven	TBD	
Estadio Vencedores de Ayacucho	20,000	Ayacucho	Peru	Ayacucho FC	TBD	
Akii Bua Stadium	20,000	Lira	Uganda		2026	
New Peterborough Stadium	19,000	Peterborough	England	Peterborough United F.C.	TBD	
Bosco dello Sport Stadium	18,500	Venice	Italy	Venezia F.C.	2027	
New Liberati Stadium	18,000	Terni	Italy	Ternana Calcio	TBD	
New Curi Stadium	18,000	Perugia	Italy	AC Perugia Calcio	TBD	
New Crotone Stadium	18,000	Crotone	Italy	F.C. Crotone	TBD	
New National Stadium	18,000	Zenica	Bosnia and Herzegovina	Bosnia and Herzegovina national football team	2029	
New Constanța Stadium	18,000	Constanța	Romania	FCV Farul Constanța	TBD	
Stadion Zürich	18,000	Zürich	Switzerland	Grasshopper Club Zürich; FC Zürich	2028	
New Bath Rugby Stadium	18,000	Bath	England	Bath Rugby	TBD	
Lithuania National Stadium	18,000	Vilnius	Lithuania	Lithuania national football team	2027	
New Kahramanmaraş Stadium	17,500	Kahramanmaraş	Turkey	Kahramanmaraşspor	TBD	
New Padova Stadium	16,500	Padua	Italy	Calcio Padova	TBD	
New Stadio Iacovone	16,500	Taranto	Italy	Taranto FC 1927	TBD	
New Oradea Stadium	16,291	Oradea	Romania	FC Bihor Oradea	2027	
New National Stadium	16,000	Riga	Latvia	Latvia national football team	TBD	
New Oxford United Stadium	16,000	Oxford	England	Oxford United F.C.	TBD	
New APOEL Stadium	16,000	Kokkinotrimithia	Cyprus	APOEL FC	TBD	
New Union SG Stadium	16,000	Forest	Belgium	Royale Union Saint-Gilloise	TBD	
New Polonia Warsaw Stadium	16,000	Warsaw	Poland	Polonia Warsaw	2030	
New Pitești Stadium	15,200	Pitești	Romania	FC Argeș Pitești	TBD	
Lahoucine Moudanib Stadium	15,000	Agadir	Morocco	Hassania Agadir	2027	
New Van Stadium	15,000	Van	Turkey	Vanspor F.K.	TBD	
New Tranmere Rovers Stadium	15,000	Birkenhead	England	Tranmere Rovers F.C.	TBD	
New Częstochowa Stadium	15,000	Częstochowa	Poland	Raków Częstochowa	TBD	
Arena Havan	15,000	Brusque	Brazil	Brusque FC	TBD	
New Niğde Stadium	15,000	Niğde	Turkey	Niğde Anadolu FK	TBD	
New FC Sion Stadium	15,000	Sion	Switzerland	FC Sion	2029	
New Jacksonville Stadium	15,000	Jacksonville	United States	Sporting Club Jacksonville	TBD	
Arkéa Park	15,000	Brest	France	Stade Brestois 29	2027	
Stade Nemausus	15,000	Nîmes	France	Nîmes Olympique	TBD	
AlumniFi Field	15,000	Detroit	United States	Detroit City FC	2028	
New Rybnik Stadium	15,000	Rybnik	Poland	KS ROW Rybnik	TBD	
Newroz International Stadium	14,500	Sulaymaniyah	Iraq	Newroz SC	TBD	
Santa Fe Yards Stadium	14,500	Denver	United States	Denver Summit FC	2029	
Karşıyaka Zübeyde Hanım Stadium	14,000	İzmir	Turkey	Karşıyaka S.K.	TBD	
New Dundee FC Stadium	12,500	Dundee	Scotland	Dundee F.C.	TBD	
New İskenderun Stadium	12,500	İskenderun	Turkey	İskenderun FK	TBD	
New Cleveland Stadium	12,500	Cleveland	United States	Forest City Cleveland	TBD	
Târgoviște Municipal Stadium	12,012	Târgoviște	Romania		2026	
Atyrau Stadium	12,000	Atyrau	Kazakhstan	FC Atyrau	TBD	
New Casertana Stadium	12,000	Caserta	Italy	Casertana F.C.	TBD	
New Hadera Stadium	12,000	Hadera	Israel	Hapoel Hadera F.C.	TBD	
Eladio Rosabal Cordero Stadium	12,000	Heredia	Costa Rica	Club Sport Herediano	2026	
El Templo de Liverpool	12,000	Montevideo	Uruguay	Liverpool F.C.	2027	
New Scunthorpe Stadium	12,000	Scunthorpe	England	Scunthorpe United F.C.	TBD	
New Stadion Kantrida	12,000	Rijeka	Croatia	HNK Rijeka	TBD	
New Agdam Imarat Stadium	11,700	Agdam	Azerbaijan	FK Qarabag	2028	
New Stadion Kranjčevićeva	11,163	Zagreb	Croatia	NK Lokomotiva Zagreb	2027	
New Portland Hearts Stadium	11,000	Portland	United States	Portland Hearts of Pine	TBD	
New Cizre Stadium	10,500	Cizre	Turkey	Cizrespor	TBD	
Blue Water Shipping Stadium	10,400	Georgetown	Guyana		TBD	
Heroes of Timișoara Arena	10,101	Timișoara	Romania	SSU Politehnica Timișoara	2027	
Arctic Arena	10,000	Bodø	Norway	FK Bodø/Glimt	2027	
New Kfar Saba Stadium	10,000	Kfar Saba	Israel	Hapoel Kfar Saba F.C.	TBD	
New Ümraniye Stadium	10,000	Istanbul	Turkey	Ümraniyespor	TBD	
New Marbella Stadium	10,000	Marbella	Spain	Marbella FC	TBD	
Oklahoma City Stadium	10,000	Oklahoma City	United States	OKC United	2028	
New Homestead Stadium	10,000	Homestead	United States	Miami FC	2027	
Palmyra International Stadium	10,000	Palmyra	Guyana		2026	
New Albuquerque Stadium	10,000	Albuquerque	United States	New Mexico United	TBD	
New Putrajaya Stadium	10,000	Putrajaya	Malaysia		TBD	
New Gorzów Stadium	10,000	Gorzów Wielkopolski	Poland	Stilon Gorzów, Warta Gorzów	TBD	
Amway Stadium	8,500	Grand Rapids	United States	AC Grand Rapids	2027	
New Suche Stawy Stadium	8,051	Kraków	Poland	Hutnik Kraków	2029	
Woodbine Stadium	8,000	Toronto	Canada		TBD	
New National Stadium	8,000	Gibraltar	Gibraltar	Gibraltar national football team	TBD	
New Ebbsfleet Stadium	8,000	Northfleet	England	Ebbsfleet United F.C.	TBD	
Iron District Stadium	8,000	Milwaukee	United States	Milwaukee USL team	TBD	
Kfar Qassem Football Stadium	8,000	Kafr Qasim	Israel	F.C. Kafr Qasim	TBD	
Soldier Beach Stadium	8,000	Aktau	Kazakhstan	FC Caspiy	TBD	
New Oulunkylä Stadium	8,000	Helsinki	Finland	IF Gnistan	TBD	
New Eastside Stadium	8,000	Jacksonville	United States	Jacksonville Armada FC	TBD	
Tiberias Football Stadium	7,554	Tiberias	Israel	Ironi Tiberias F.C.	TBD	
Darrell Gooden Stadium	7,500	Pensacola	United States	West Florida Argonauts football	2028	
New Omaha Stadium	7,000	Omaha	United States	Union Omaha	2028	
New Barnet Stadium	7,000	Barnet	England	Barnet F.C.	TBD	
New Kyzylorda Stadium	7,000	Kyzylorda	Kazakhstan	FC Kaisar	TBD	
New 7 Ocak Stadium	6,500	Osmaniye	Turkey	Osmaniyespor FK	2026	
New Wealdstone Stadium	6,300	Uxbridge	England	Wealdstone F.C.	TBD	
Pro Iowa Stadium	6,000	Des Moines	United States	USL Pro Iowa	TBD	
Modi'in Stadium	6,000	Modi'in-Maccabim-Re'ut	Israel	Ironi Modi'in F.C.	TBD	
New FC Andorra Stadium	6,000	Encamp	Andorra	FC Andorra	TBD	
Walton & One Stadium	6,000	Port St. Lucie, Florida	United States	Port St. Lucie SC	2028	
Reno Soccer Stadium	6,000	Reno	United States	Reno City FC	2028	
New Hercílio Luz Stadium	5,500	Tubarão	Brazil	Hercílio Luz FC	TBD	
Everett Outdoor Event Center	5,000	Everett	United States	Everett AquaSox	2028	
New Ballpark at The Farm	5,000	Blaine	United States	Blaine American Association team	2028	
Eco Park	5,000	Stonehouse	England	Forest Green Rovers F.C.	TBD	
New Sheffield Stadium	5,000	Sheffield	England	Sheffield F.C., Sheffield Eagles	TBD	
Northwest Arkansas Soccer Stadium	5,000	Rogers	United States	Ozark United FC	TBD	
Winter Garden Stadium	5,000	Winter Garden	United States	Central Florida Pro Soccer	TBD	
New Marsa Stadium	5,000	Marsa	Malta		TBD	
Stadion Warty Poznań	5,000	Poznań	Poland	Warta Poznań	TBD	
Energy City Metro Ballpark	3,470	Spruce Grove	Canada	Energy City Cactus Rats	2026	
New Georgia State Ballpark	1,000	Atlanta	United States	Georgia State Panthers baseball	2027	

== See also ==
- List of stadiums
- List of stadiums by capacity
- List of closed stadiums by capacity
- List of sports venues by capacity
