= Tajiat Olympic Stadium =

Association football stadium

Tajiat Olympic Stadium ملعب تاجيات الأولمبي
- Interactive map of Tajiat Olympic Stadium ملعب تاجيات الأولمبي
- Former names: Baghdad International Stadium
- Location: Baghdad, Iraq
- Coordinates: 33°25′50.0″N 44°17′05.0″E
- Owner: Ministry of Youth and Sports
- Capacity: 60,000
- Field size: 105 m × 68 m (344 ft × 223 ft)

Construction
- Groundbreaking: 2014
- Structural engineer: NCK
- Services engineer: Boland Payeh
- General contractor: Haris Engineering

Website
- moys.gov.iq

Tajiat Olympic Stadium (Arabic: ملعب تاجيات الأولمبي), is a football stadium that is currently under construction in Tajiat, just north of Baghdad in Iraq. It will be part of a sports complex and will hold 60,000 seats.

== Plans ==
First plans were drawn up in 2009, where an Olympic stadium would be built containing 100,000 seats. However, the Ministry of Youth and Sports decided to reduce the capacity to 60,000 and instead build 2 other 30,000 seater stadiums. (Ammo Baba Stadium and Al-Madina Stadium). Iranian company Boland Payeh won the design competition with their concept of the new stadium. Construction finally started in 2013, however by 2022, the stadium is still not completed, with the head of Ministry of Youth and Sports and Iraqi Football Association president Adnan Dirjal saying that the stadium construction is on hold as they are waiting for more money to complete it as it requires a lot of money.

== Design ==
The stadium is round and its facade is inspired by Arabic architecture, with the general design influenced by historical islamic buildings.

== See also ==
- Football in Iraq
- List of football stadiums in Iraq
- List of future stadiums
