= Babil Stadium =

Stadium in Iraq

Babil Stadium ملعب بابل الدولي
- Interactive map of Babil Stadium ملعب بابل الدولي
- Location: Hillah, Iraq
- Coordinates: 32°23′40.3″N 44°27′22.8″E
- Owner: Ministry of Youth and Sports
- Capacity: 32,200
- Surface: Grass

Construction
- Groundbreaking: 21 June 2012
- Cost: 116.212 billion IQD
- Architect: Javier Garcia Alda
- Main contractor: TriArena

Babil Stadium (Arabic: ملعب بابل, romanized: Malʿab bābl) is a football stadium that is currently under construction in Babil, Iraq. It will primarily serve as the new home stadium of Babylon SC and Al-Qasim SC. The stadium will cost 116.212 billion IQD, funded entirely by Iraqi government. It is located in the neighborhood of Al Hillah, in Babil Governorate, home to what is left of the ancient city of Babylon. It will seat 32,200 spectators. The stadium was originally scheduled to open in early 2014, but due to financial crises, construction has been put on hold multiple times. As of February 2022, the stadium is yet to be completed.

== Design ==
The project consists of a sports complex of 225 hectares, containing a football stadium for 32,200 spectators, two training fields, a four star hotel and parking areas. The main football stadium includes cafés, restaurants, changing rooms, VIP areas and spectator boxes. The venue designed by Javier Garcia Alda was initially to have single-tiered stands, but final layout will see it with two tiers. It does not have an athletics track, allowing spectators to enjoy an optimal visual experience. The design of the stadium is an contrast of the latest technologies and the traditional Arabic culture reflected through the combination of functional structures and ornamental patterns which create a new harmony. The design complies with FIFA requirements.

== See also ==
- List of football stadiums in Iraq
- List of future stadiums
