= Al-Mashrah Stadium =

Stadium in Maysan, Iraq

- ملعب المشرح
- Interactive map of Al-Mashrah Stadium
- Location: Al-Kahla District, Maysan, Iraq
- Coordinates: 31°48′59.1″N 47°26′21.8″E
- Owner: Ministry of Youth and Sports
- Capacity: 2,000
- Field size: 105 by 68 metres (114.8 yd × 74.4 yd)

Construction
- Opened: 2014
- Cost: 4.5 billion IQD

Tenant
- Al-Mashrah FC

Al-Mashrah Stadium (Arabic: ملعب المشرح) is a multi-purpose stadium in Maysan, Iraq. It is currently used mostly for football matches and is the home stadium of Al-Mashrah FC. The stadium has a capacity crowd of 2,000 and is owned and operated by the Ministry of Youth and Sports.

== Location ==
The stadium is located in Al-Mashrah township of Al-Kahla District, approximately 25 kilometres (16 miles) south of Al-Amarah.

== See also ==
- List of football stadiums in Iraq
