= Hangzhou Yuhang Economic Development Area =

The Hangzhou Yuhang Economic Development Area (HYEDA, simplified Chinese: 杭州余杭经济技术开发区; traditional Chinese: 杭州余杭經濟技術開發區; pinyin: Hángzhōu Yúháng Jīngjì Jìshù Kāifā Qū), also known as the Qianjiang Economic Development Area (simplified Chinese: 钱江经济开发区; traditional Chinese: 錢江經濟開發區; pinyin: Qiánjiāng Jīngjì Kāifā Qū), is an economic and technological development area in Yuhang District of Hangzhou, Zhejiang, China.

== History ==
The Hangzhou Yuhang Economic-Technological Development Area was formed in November 1993. On July 30, 2012, it became a national-level economic and technological development area. In 2015, the Hangzhou Yuhang Economic-Technological Area combined with the Qianjiang Economic Development Area covering a combined total of 76.94 square kilometres. In 2017, it jumped 48 places from the previous year ranking 77th out of China's 219 national economic and technological development areas.

== Economy ==
By the end of 2016, there were more than 270 enterprises exceeding CNY¥20 million in annual revenue and 19 publicly traded companies. In 2016, the industrial output value exceeded CNY¥50 billion, and the total fiscal tax revenue was CNY¥4.07 billion.

The Hangzhou Yuhang Economic-Technological Development Area's strategic focus is on five core industries and their integration with the internet:

1. Intelligent Equipment Industry (electrical appliances, mechanical parts, advanced manufacturing equipment)
2. Health Care Industry (pharmaceuticals, bio-medicine, medical equipment)
3. Green Industry (environmental protection, new energy, energy saving)
4. Fabric and Textile Industry (production and design)
5. Modern Service Industry (financial services, science and technology research, tourism, education)

== Location ==
The Hangzhou Yuhang Economic-Technological Development Area is located at the heart of the Yangtze River Delta economic circle. It is 39 minutes away from Shanghai by high-speed train, 39 km (about a 25 minutes drive) away from Hangzhou Xiaoshan International Airport, 150 km (about a 1.5-hour drive) away from Shanghai Hongqiao Airport, and 170 km (about a 2-hour drive) away from Ningbo Airport. It is also connected with Hangzhou Metro Line 1 with plans for Line 3, 9, and 12 when completed.
