= List of indoor arenas in Kazakhstan =

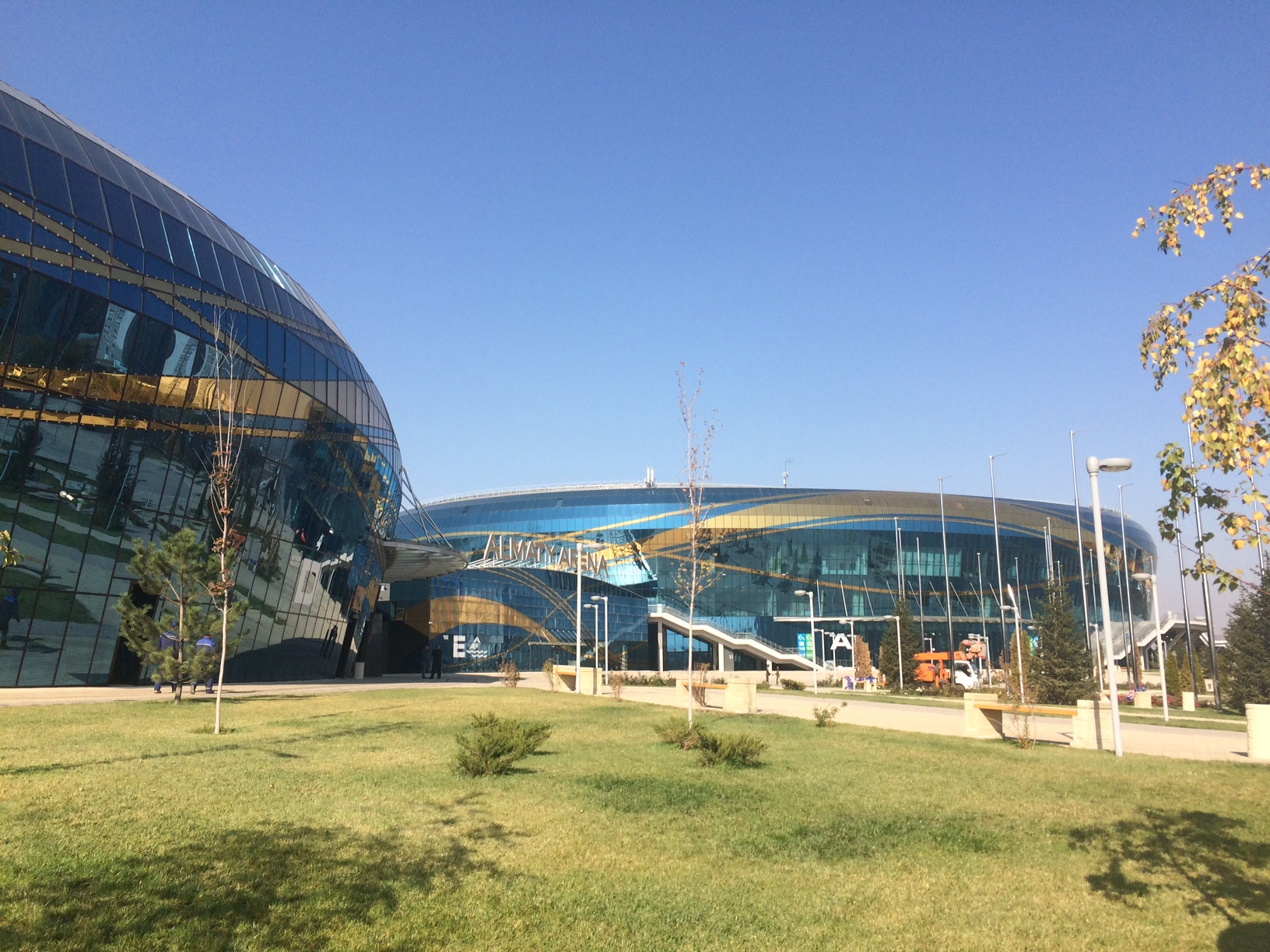
Almaty Arena

The following is a list of indoor arenas in Kazakhstan with capacity of at least 2,000 spectators. Most of the arenas in this list are for multi use proposes such as individual sports, team sports as well as cultural and political events.

== Currently in use ==
Location	Arena	Date built	Capacity	Tenants
Almaty	Almaty Arena	2016	12,000	
Almaty	Baluan Sholak Sports Palace	1967	5,000	
Almaty	Halyk Arena	2017	3,000	
Astana	Alau Ice Palace	2011	8,000	
Astana	Barys Arena	2015	11,578	
Astana	Daulet National Tennis Center	2008	2,700	Kazakhstan Fed Cup team
Astana	Kazakhstan Sports Palace	2001	4,070	
Astana	Saryarka Velodrome	2011	10,000	BC Astana
Karaganda	Akzholtay Sports Palace	1972	2,500	
Karaganda	Karagandy Arena	2011	5,500	Saryarka Karagandy
Oskemen	Boris Alexandrov Sports Palace	1968	4,400	Kazzinc-Torpedo

== See also ==
- List of football stadiums in Kazakhstan
- List of indoor arenas by capacity
