= List of football stadiums in Iraq =

The following is a list of football stadiums in Iraq, ordered by capacity.

== Current stadiums ==
#	Image	Stadium	Capacity	City	Home team	Sport	Opened	Ref
1		Basra International Stadium	65,227	Basra	Iraq national football team	Football	2013	
2		Al-Shaab Stadium	35,700	Baghdad	Al-Quwa Al-Jawiya, Al-Talaba SC	Football	1966	
3		Al-Madina Stadium	32,000	Al Habibya, Baghdad	Iraq national football team	Football	2021	
4		Karbala International Stadium	30,000	Karbala	Karbala SC	Football	2016	
5		Al-Najaf International Stadium	30,000	Najaf	Al-Najaf SC, Naft Al-Wasat SC	Football	2018	
6		Al-Minaa Olympic Stadium	30,000	Basra	Al-Minaa SC	Football	2022	
7		Franso Hariri Stadium	25,000	Erbil	Erbil SC	Football	1956	
8		Kirkuk Olympic Stadium	25,000	Kirkuk	Kirkuk SC	Football	1982	
9		Maysan Stadium	25,000	Amarah	Naft Maysan SC, Maysan SC	Football	1987	
10		Duhok Stadium	22,800	Duhok	Duhok SC	Football	1986	
11		Zakho International Stadium	20,000	Zakho	Zakho SC	Football	2015	
12		Al-Kut Olympic Stadium	20,000	Al Kut	Al-Kut SC	Football	2018	
13		Sulaymaniyah Stadium	18,000	Sulaymaniyah	Sulaymaniyah SC, Newroz SC	Football		
14		Nasiriyah Local Administration Stadium	17,000	Nasiriyah	Al-Nasiriya SC	Football	2024	
15		Al-Zawraa Stadium	15,443	Baghdad	Al-Zawraa SC	Football	2022	
16		Al Ramadi Stadium	15,000	Ramadi	Al-Ramadi SC, Al-Fahad SC	Football		
17		Al-Samawah Stadium	15,000	Al Muthanna	Al-Samawa SC, Uruk SC	Football		
18		Newroz International Stadium	14,500	Sulaymaniyah	Newroz SC	Football	2024	
19		Al-Shorta Stadium	10,089	Baghdad	Al-Shorta SC	Football	2025	
20		Al Fayhaa Stadium	10,000	Basra	Naft Al-Basra SC, Al-Minaa SC	Football	2013	
21		An-Najaf Stadium	10,000	Najaf	Al-Najaf SC	Football	1970	
22		Suq Al-Shuyukh Stadium	10,000	Dhi Qar	Al-Furat SC, Suq Al-Shuyukh SC	Football	2015	
23		Delal Stadium	10,000	Zakho	Zakho SC	Football		
24		Al Aziziyah Stadium	10,000	Wasit	Al-Aziziyah SC	Football	2019	
25		Ba'quba Stadium	10,000	Baqubah	Diyala SC	Football		
26		Tikrit Stadium	10,000	Tikrit	Salahaddin SC, Tikrit SC	Football		
27		Halabja Stadium	9,000	Halabja, Sulaymaniyah	Halabja SC	Football	2009	
28		Al Kifl Stadium	8,000	Al Kifl, Babylon	Al-Qasim SC, Al-Kifl SC, Afak SC	Football	2018	
29		Samarra Stadium	8,000	Samarra	Samarra SC	Football		
30		Al Shatrah Stadium	7,500	Al-Shatrah, Nasiriyah	Al-Shatra SC, Akkad SC	Football	2016	
31		Al-Bahri Stadium	7,000	Al-Jubaila, Basra	Al-Bahri SC	Football	2022	
32		Al-Fallujah Stadium	7,000	Fallujah, Al Anbar	Al-Jolan SC, Al-Falluja SC, Al-Karma SC	Football	2022	
33		Sharar Haidar Stadium	6,000	Mansour, Baghdad	Al-Karkh SC	Football	2004	
34		Al-Sinaa Stadium	6,000	Al Habibya, Baghdad	Al-Sinaa SC, Al-Sinaat Al-Kahrabaiya SC	Football		
35		Al-Quwa Al-Jawiya Stadium	6,000	Rusafa, Baghdad	Al-Quwa Al-Jawiya	Football	2004	
36		Al Jaish Stadium	6,000	Baghdad	Al-Jaish SC	Football		
37		Al-Musayyib Stadium	5,000	Musayyib	Al-Musayyib SC	Football	2025	
38		Afak Stadium	5,000	Afak, Diwaniya	Al-Diwaniya SC, Afak SC	Football	2016	
39		Five Thousand Stadium	5,000	Sadr City, Baghdad	Al-Hussein SC	Football		
40		Al-Zubair Stadium	5,000	Basra	Al-Zubair SC	Football	2013	
41		Al-Masafi Stadium	5,000	Baghdad	Al-Masafi SC	Football		
42		Amanat Baghdad Stadium	5,000	Mansour, Baghdad	Amanat Baghdad SC	Football		
43		Al-Taji Stadium	5,000	Taji, Baghdad	Al Taji SC, Al-Etisalat SC	Football	2017	
44		University of Mosul Stadium	5,000	Mosul	Mosul FC	Football		
45		Al-Diwaniya Stadium	5,000	Al Diwaniyah	Al-Diwaniya SC	Football		
46		Al-Hay Stadium	5,000	Al-Hay, Wasit	Al-Hay	Football	2024	
47		Al Naft Stadium	3,000	Hayy Ur, Baghdad	Al-Naft SC	Football		
48		Al Hilla Stadium	3,000	Hillah	Babylon SC, Al-Hilla SC	Football		
49		Ayn al-Tamr Stadium	2,000	Ayn al-Tamr, Karbala	Ain Al-Tamur SC, Karbala SC	Football	2019	
50		Al-Maimouna Stadium	2,000	Amarah, Maysan	Maysan SC, Naft Maysan SC	Football	2012	
51		Al-Mashrah Stadium	2,000	Maysan	Maysan SC	Football	2014	
52		Al-Shabab Stadium	2,000	Karbala	Karbala SC	Football	2016	
53		Kamal Salim Stadium	2,000	Sulaymaniyah	Newroz SC	Football		

== Future stadiums ==
Stadiums which are currently in development include

Stadium	Capacity	City	Coordinates	Home team	Sport	Status
Tajiat Olympic Stadium	60,000	Baghdad	33°25′48″N 44°17′05″E	Iraq national football team	Football	Under construction
Babil Stadium	32,200	Hillah	32°23′40″N 44°27′23″E	Al-Qasim SC, Babil SC	Football	Under construction
Ammo Baba Stadium	31,200	Baghdad	33°28′17″N 44°22′25″E		Football	Under construction
Al-Anbar Stadium	31,056	Ramadi	33°25′59″N 43°10′14″E	Al-Ramadi SC	Football	Under construction
Dhi Qar Olympic Stadium	30,000	Nasiriyah	31°09′47″N 46°14′23″E		Football	Under construction
Shatrah Stadium	30,000	Shatrah	31°24′08″N 46°12′19″E	Shatrah FC	Football	Under construction
Al Sunbula Stadium	30,000	Diwaniyah	31°55′38″N 44°53′59″E	Al-Diwaniya SC	Football	On hold
Salah Al Din Stadium	30,000	Tikrit	34°37′25″N 43°37′35″E	Salahaddin SC	Football	Under construction
Diyala Stadium	30,000	Baqubah	33°47′52″N 44°35′44″E	Diyala SC	Football	Under construction
Mosul International Stadium	30,000	Mosul	36°23′52″N 43°11′03″E	Al-Mosul SC	Football	Under construction
Bab Sinjar Stadium	20,000	Mosul	36°20′27″N 43°06′55″E	Mosul SC	Football	On hold
New Samawah Stadium	20,000	Samawah	31°14′39″N 45°23′50″E	Al-Samawa SC	Football	On hold
Al-Karmah Stadium	5,000	Al-Karmah, Al-Anbar	33°22′17″N 43°54′19″E	Al-Karma SC	Football	Under construction

== Proposed ==
Stadium	Capacity	City	Home team	Sport	Year	Status	Source
Baghdad Olympic Stadium	100,000	Baghdad	Iraq national football team	Football	2010	Unrealized	
King Salman Sports City	85,000	Baghdad	Iraq national football team	Football	2019	Approved	
Salah al-Din Stadium	50,000	Tikrit	Tikrit SC	Football	2013	Unrealized	
Bismayah New City Stadium	25,000	Bismaya	Bismaya SC	Football	2013	Approved (CBD Phase)	
Al-Talaba Stadium	16,000	Baghdad	Al-Talaba SC	Football	2012	Unrealized	
Al-Karkh Stadium	12,500	Baghdad	Al-Karkh SC	Football	2015	Unrealized	

== See also ==
- List of Asian stadiums by capacity
- List of association football stadiums by capacity
- List of association football stadiums by country
- List of sports venues by capacity
- Lists of stadiums
