= Mosul International Stadium =

Stadium in Iraq

Mosul International Stadium ملعب الموصل الدولي
- Interactive map of Mosul International Stadium ملعب الموصل الدولي
- Location: Mosul, Iraq
- Coordinates: 36°23′52.3″N 43°11′03.1″E
- Owner: Ministry of Youth and Sports
- Capacity: 30,000
- Surface: Grass

Construction
- Groundbreaking: September 2020
- Architect: Orion Architecture
- Services engineers: Tekcelik & Uzunlar Co.

Tenant
- Mosul FC

Mosul International Stadium (Arabic: ملعب الموصل الدولي), also known as Nineveh Stadium, is a football stadium currently under construction in Mosul, Iraq. It will have a capacity of 30,000 spectators and will be the new home of Mosul FC, replacing its current home, Al Mosul University Stadium. It is located at the northern entrance to the city, near the Al-Shalalat road as a part of a sports complex also including two athletic fields with a capacity of 4000 and 500 seats respectively.

== History ==
Although the project was announced in March 2013, early enabling works on the site began in the second half of 2020. The Turkish company Tekcelik & Uzunlar Co. is in charge of the works. The main stadium is designed specifically for football and does not have an athletic track in order to ensure an optimal viewing experience for spectators. The facility is fully compliant with FIFA standards.

== See also ==
- List of football stadiums in Iraq
- List of future stadiums
- Football in Iraq
