= Chongxian =

Chongxian may refer to:

- Xuedou Chongxian (980–1052), Chinese Buddhist monk
- Chongxian Township, Xinfeng County, Ganzhou, Jiangxi, China
- Chongxian Township, Xingguo County, Ganzhou, Jiangxi, China
- Chongxian Subdistrict, Yuhang District, Hangzhou, Zhejiang, China
