= Ain Al-Tamur Stadium =

Stadium in Ayn al-Tamr, Iraq

Ain Al-Tamur Stadium ملعب عين التمر
- Interactive map of Ain Al-Tamur Stadium ملعب عين التمر
- Location: Ayn al-Tamr, Karbala, Iraq
- Coordinates: 32°33′59.8″N 43°28′34.7″E
- Owner: Ministry of Youth and Sports
- Capacity: 2,000
- Surface: Artificial turf
- Field size: 105 by 68 metres (114.8 yd × 74.4 yd)

Construction
- Opened: 11 March 2019
- Cost: 7 billion IQD

Tenant
- Ain Al-Tamur SC

Ain Al-Tamur Stadium (Arabic: ملعب عين التمر) is a multi-purpose stadium in Ayn al-Tamr, 86 km west of Karbala, Iraq. It is currently used mostly for football matches and serves as the home stadium of Ain Al-Tamur SC. The stadium holds 2,000 people.

== See also ==
- List of football stadiums in Iraq
