= Heroes of Timișoara Arena =

- Arena „Eroii Timișoarei”
- Lego Stadium
- Interactive map of Heroes of Timișoara Arena
- Location: Calea Buziașului, Timișoara, Romania
- Coordinates: 45.7303246°N 21.269024°E
- Owner: Timișoara City Hall; Timiș County Council
- Capacity: 10,101
- Type: Soccer-specific stadium
- Surface: Grass
- Acreage: 9,000 m^{2} (2.2 acres)

Construction
- Groundbreaking: March 2024
- Cost: EUR 24.8 million
- Builder: Tehnodomus

Heroes of Timișoara Arena (Romanian: Arena „Eroii Timișoarei”) is a soccer-specific stadium under construction in Timișoara, Romania. The project started in March 2024, with costs estimated at 24.8 million euros, fully funded by the local budget.

== Project ==
The stadium is constructed on a concrete foundation, with the stands supported by a metal framework. It spans an area of over 9,000 m². The covered seating sections will accommodate 10,101 spectators. The pitch will feature natural grass, and the stadium will be equipped with cutting-edge facilities. Tensioned membranes—lightweight structures made from composite materials—will cover the stadium to allow natural light to enter. The ground floor will include locker rooms, administrative offices, a medical center, a police station, first aid areas, anti-doping testing rooms, a warm-up zone, and more. The first floor will house private boxes, offices, and various additional spaces, while the second floor will be dedicated to the VAR system, TV broadcast booths, press areas, and a workspace for photographers. Classified as a UEFA Category 4 (Elite) venue, it is also nicknamed the "Lego Stadium."

Through a separate project, a multi-level parking lot with over 450 spaces, as well as a park with a playground, is also to be built here.

This stadium, built without an athletics track, will comply with UEFA and IFAB regulations, allowing it to host top-division and international matches, as well as training sessions for children's and youth teams. In addition to football games, it will also accommodate concerts and large-scale events.

The completion date is scheduled for June 2026.

== Construction ==
The design and construction contract was signed in May 2023. At the beginning of February 2024, the building permit was also issued. Groundbreaking commenced in early March, with representatives from both the Politehnica Timișoara team and the city hall attending the event. During the first phase, foundation pouring started in May, but it was later required to remove the buried waste found at the site.

== See also ==
- Dan Păltinișanu Stadium (2025)
- List of football stadiums in Romania
- List of European stadiums by capacity
- List of future stadiums
