= Al Hilla Stadium =

Stadium in Al Hillah, Iraq

Coordinates: 32°31′09″N 44°26′27″E

Al Hilla Stadium is a multi-use stadium in Al Hillah, Iraq. It is used mostly for football matches and serves as the home stadium of Babil SC and Al-Hilla SC. The stadium holds 3,000 people.

== See also ==
- List of football stadiums in Iraq
