= Michele Uva =

Italian international sports administrator

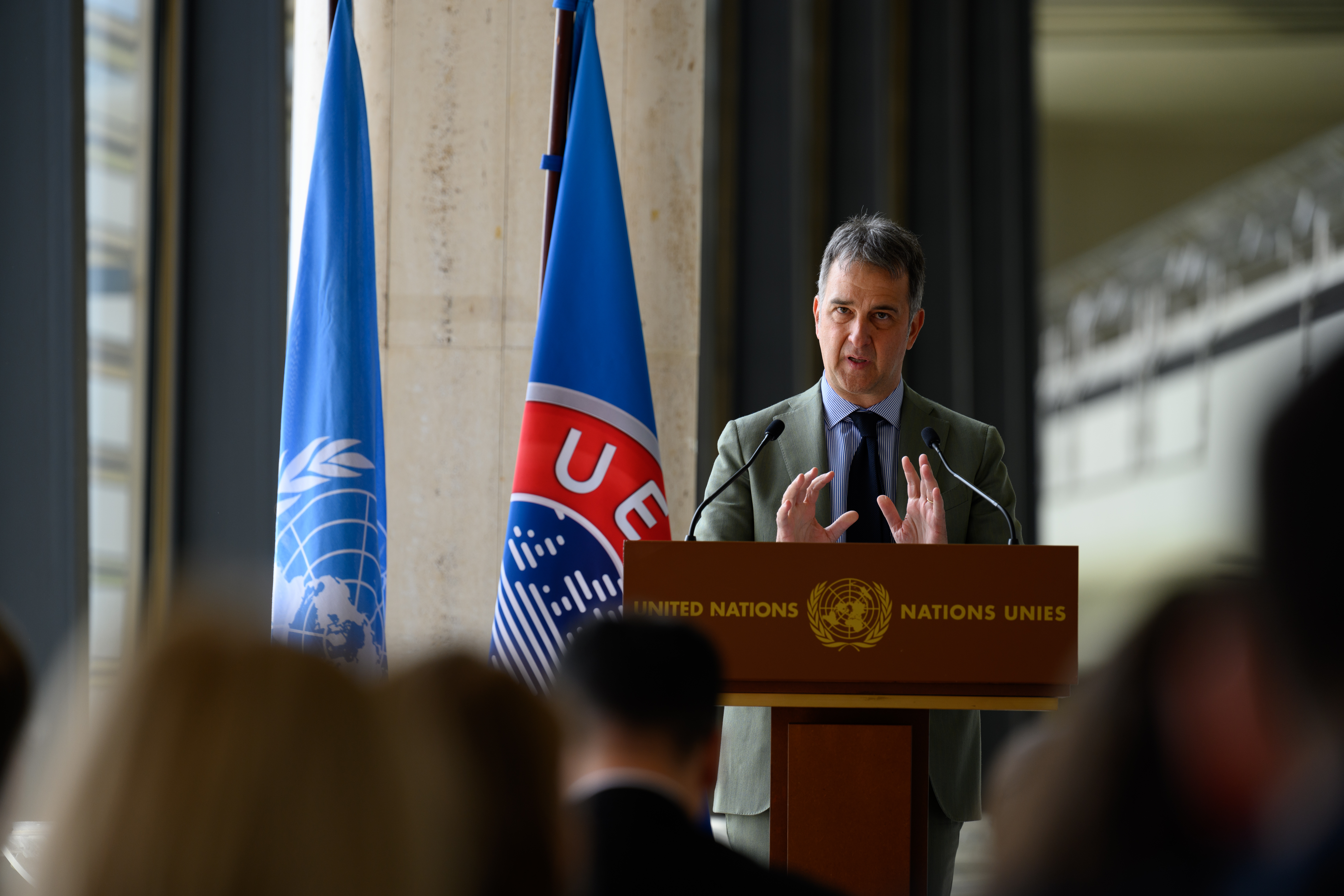

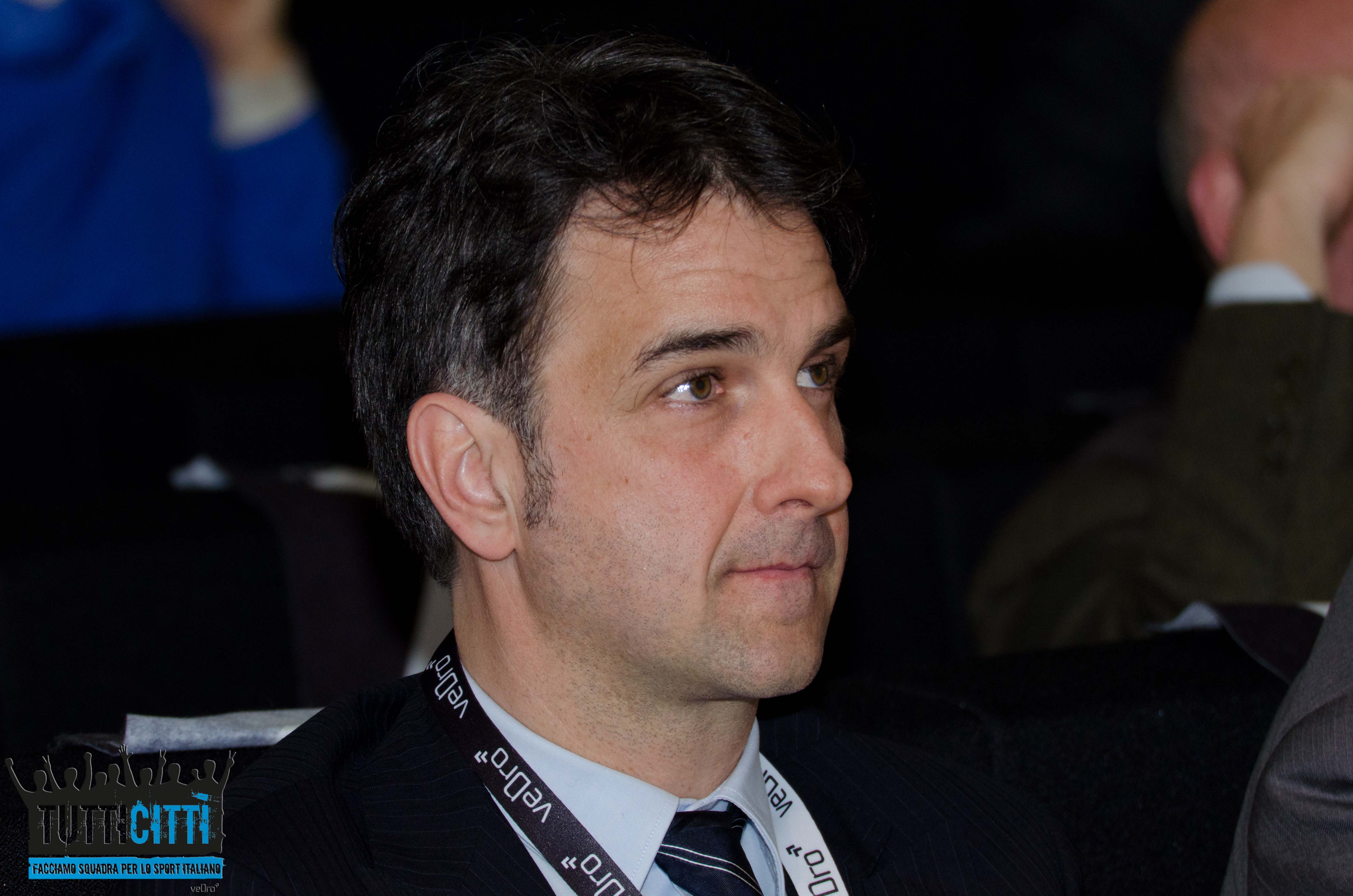

Michele Uva (born in Matera, Italy, 8 November 1964) is an international sports administrator. He is working for UEFA - Union of European Football Associations - as Executive director for UEFA EURO 2032 - Italy.

He has been Executive D for Sustainability since 2021 to 2026. He was UEFA vice president and UEFA executive committee member from May 2017 to 2020 and Italian FA Chief executive officer from 12 September 2014 to December 2018. Author of seven books (the last one "Soldi Vs Idee"- 2023), UEFA Sustainability Strategy 2030 and several economic publications.

The Financial Times considered him as "one of Europe's most powerful football executives" and l'Equipe gave him the nickname of "jeune loop".

In October 2025 he has been included, unique in the world of sport, in TIME100 Climate, list of 100 influential leaders in climate

CAREER HIGHLIGHTS

Graduate at University of Bologna, over the last 40 years Uva has performed several roles in several sports organisations: UEFA, Italian Olympic Committee, Professional football clubs (Lazio and Parma), Italian Football Association and Serie A League, basketball and volleyball teams.

Actually he is the Executive Director for UEFA EURO 2032.

In the past as Executive director for Sustainability , he has been responsible for combining UEFA's core business activities with sustainability and social responsibility by incorporating sporting, social, environmental, governance and economic aspects into each other, bringing UEFA and its activities into an inclusive, accessible, sustainable framework. Author of UEFA's sustainability strategy 'Strength Through Unity 2030' and many guidelines on social and environmental topics applied to sport. He has been a speaker on the topic of sustainability in international contexts: United Nations, Council of Europe, European Commission, COP28, WEF, EXPO 2025. Creator of the UEFA Unity EURO Cup and Walking Fottball EURO Cup. Executive editor for UEFA of: Sustainability Infrastructure Guidelines, Circular Economy Guidelines, Catering Guidelines, Accessibility Guidelines, Walking Football Guidelines, Take Care Programme.

CAREER DETAILS

In Volleyball

In 1985, Uva made his first steps in professional sport becoming the Head of the Youth Sector at Zinella Volley Bologna, a team he previously played for. He then became team manager of Sisley Treviso, part of the Benetton Group, before moving - in 1992 - becoming CEO of women's volleyball professional club PVF Matera. During his four-year term, the Club enjoyed a highly successful run winning two Champions Leagues, a European Supercup, three Italian Leagues and three Italian Cups. In 1996, he was nominated President of the Italian Women's Volleyball League.

In Football

In the summer of 1996, Uva took his first managerial role in football as he was appointed CEO of Parma AC Football Club. Under his guidance, the club won a UEFA Cup, an Italian Cup and an Italian Supercup, being twice runners-up in the Italian Serie A. His first manager in Parma was Carlo Ancelotti

In 2001, Uva moved to S.S. Lazio becoming the club's CEO and vice-president. His experience at Lazio ended swiftly with Uva growing restless with President Sergio Cragnotti and leaving his post in November 2002.

In 2004, after a consultancy role for US football club New York MetroStars, he became Director of the Italian branch and international consultant of SPORT + MARKT AG, a German sport consultancy company based in Cologne.

In Basketball

In 2006, Uva joined basketball club Lottomatica Virtus Roma as CEO reaching the Serie A Scudetto Finals and the Euroleague Top-16 on both occasions. He departed from the club at the expiration of his 2-year contract.

In Italian Football Association and Italian Olympic Committee

In 2009, Uva returned to football joining FIGC (Italian Football Association), initially as a Project Manager for the UEFA EURO 2016 Bid and then as Chief Development Officer. The department he established covered the following areas: Social Responsibility, Research, Fundraising, Management Development, Stadiums' Safety and Security, International Partnerships, Cultural Promotion and Special Projects.

During his first spell at FIGC, Uva started his collaboration with UEFA (Uefa Delegate, Stadia Management Expert, member of the working group on "NA financial benchmarking tool") and FIFA (Instructor and Match Officer).

In 2013, Uva was appointed as CEO of Italian Olympic Committee CONI SpA the operative company managing all Italian National Olympic Committee's assets, activities and administrative tasks, including the Human Resources. He was in charge with the Italian team expedition at the Sochi Winter Olympic Games.

Uva was strongly linked to AC Milan following a turnover at the club; these rumours were initially dismissed by the head of the Italian National Olympic Committee, Giovanni Malagò. Uva subsequently confirmed that he had been on the verge of joining the club.

Uva eventually left CONI in September 2014, returning to FIGC as chief executive officer. He led the Federation under the turbulent days following Italy's World Cup qualifier elimination against Sweden and the resignation of President Carlo Tavecchio and has been confirmed in his role by Giovanni Malagò following the Federation's commissionership by CONI.

In the summer 2018, following AC Milan's change of ownership, with the American investment fund Elliott taking over Chinese investor Li Yonghong, Uva was once again linked to the club. Uva emerged as a candidate for the CEO. As reported by Sky, despite being honoured by this offer, Uva turned down the position in order to continue his mandate as FIGC chief executive officer and UEFA vice-president. During a personal interview with UEFA Direct Magazine, Uva had previously revealed to be an admirer of Arrigo Sacchi's Milan side.

== UEFA ==
Executive Directore for UEFA EURO 2032 - Italy. Current position.

Executive Director for Sustainability - 2021 - 2026

On 5 April 2017, Uva was elected to the UEFA Executive Committee after the European confederation's 41st Ordinary Congress. He polled 46 votes from 55. In September of the same year, Uva became UEFA vice-president. He replaced the former president of the Spanish Football Federation, Ángel María Villar Llona.

He held the following roles at UEFA:

- UEFA Executive Committee (vice-president)
- Club Licensing Committee (chairman)
- Women's Football Committee (deputy chairman)
- Finance Committee (member)
- Professional Football Strategic Council (member)
- Club Competition SA (board member)
- UEFA Strategic Steering Committee
- National Team Committee (deputy chairman)

== Lecturing and publications ==
Uva lectures at numerous universities and master courses in Europe.

He has published the following books on sports and football industries

- La ripartenza, 2010, Ed. AREL - Il Mulino. Authors: M. Uva & G. Teotino
- Viaggio nello sport italiano, Ed. ESF - 2011 Authors: M. Uva & M. Vitale
- Il calcio ai tempi dello spread, 2012, Ed. AREL - Il Mulino. Authors: M. Uva, G. Teotino with the collaboration of N. Donna
- Viaggio nello sport italiano, Ed. ICS - 2013 . Authors: M. Uva & M. Vitale
- Il Calcio Conta, 2014. Ed. Rai ERI e BUR. Authors: M. Uva, N. Donna & G. Teotino
- Campionesse. Storie vincenti del calcio femminile, 2018. Ed. GIUNTI. Authors: M. Uva & M. Gasparri
- Soldi Vs Idee. Come cambia il calcio fuori dal campo, 2023. Ed, Mondadori

AWARDS

"Stella di bronzo" Italian Olympic Committee – 2015

"Riconoscimento Speciale" Maestrelli trophy - 2015

Prize USSI - 2016

"Maurizio Maestrelli" – 2016

Prize Faustino Somma - 2018

Prize Oreste Granillo - 2018

Prize Scognamiglio - 2019

Manger of the Year 2024 - MSA

Title of Commendator of the Republic of San Marino - 2018"

== Personal life ==
Uva is married to TV presenter Valentina Arrigo and has one son, Gabriele, who enjoys football and volley as well.
