= Wuchang Subdistrict =

Wuchang Subdistrict 五常街道
- Subdistrict
- Location in Zhejiang
- Coordinates: 30.2608°N 120.0370°E
- Country: People's Republic of China
- Province: Zhejiang
- Prefecture-level city: Hangzhou
- District: Yuhang District
- Time zone: UTC+8 (China Standard)

Wuchang Subdistrict (五常街道) is a subdistrict of Yuhang District, Hangzhou, Zhejiang, China. As of 2023, it administers the following twenty residential communities:

- Wuchang Community
- Gujiaqiao Community (顾家桥社区)
- Yanshanhe Community (沿山河社区)
- Hengbanqiao Community (横板桥社区)
- Jingfeng Community (荆丰社区)
- Jingshan Community (荆山社区)
- Youyi Community (友谊社区)
- Wenyi Community (文一社区)
- Yongfu Community (永福社区)
- Jingsheng Community (景盛社区)
- Xixifengqing Community (西溪风情社区)
- Yunchuang Community (云创社区)
- Hongyuan Community (洪园社区)
- Haihui Community (海汇社区)
- Haishu Community (海曙社区)
- Qiuqiao Community (邱桥社区)
- Haichuang Community (海创社区)
- Hongwan Community (宏湾社区)
- Nanteng Community (南滕社区)
- Jingyang Community (荆阳社区)

== See also ==
- List of township-level divisions of Zhejiang
