= Dinamo Stadium (2025) =

Proposed stadium in Bucharest, Romania

Mircea Lucescu Arena
- Interactive map of Mircea Lucescu Arena
- Former names: Dinamo Stadium
- Location: Bucharest, Romania
- Coordinates: 44°27′29″N 26°6′11″E
- Owner: Ministry of Internal Affairs
- Operator: Dinamo București
- Capacity: 26,217
- Type: Soccer-specific stadium
- Surface: Grass

Construction
- Groundbreaking: 2026
- Opened: 2028 or 2029
- Cost: €172 million
- Architect: DICO și ȚIGĂNAȘ
- General contractor: Bog'Art

Tenant
- Dinamo București

The Mircea Lucescu Arena, formerly known as New Dinamo Stadium is a proposed football stadium in Bucharest, Romania.

The contract for the feasibility study was signed in September 2020. The works will last between 18 and 24 months. Initially CS Dinamo București handed over to CNI the location of the current velodrome for which the public procurement procedure was started.

== History ==
After several years, however, the project was eventually brought to fruition. Construction began in early 2026, starting with the demolition of the old stadium, and is expected to last three years.

The new venue will be built on the site of the existing stadium. It is planned as a modern, football-specific facility with a capacity of over 26,000 spectators. The stands will be fully covered, and the exterior will feature a unique, decorative facade.

On 19 April 2026, the Ministry of Internal Affairs issued a statement announcing that the new stadium would be named Mircea Lucescu Arena, in honor of the legendary Romanian footballer and manager Mircea Lucescu who died on 7 April 2026.

== See also ==
- List of football stadiums in Romania
- List of European stadia by capacity
- List of future stadiums
