= Al Sunbula Stadium =

Football stadium in Al Diwaniyah, Iraq (under construction)

Al Sunbula Stadium ملعب السنبلة
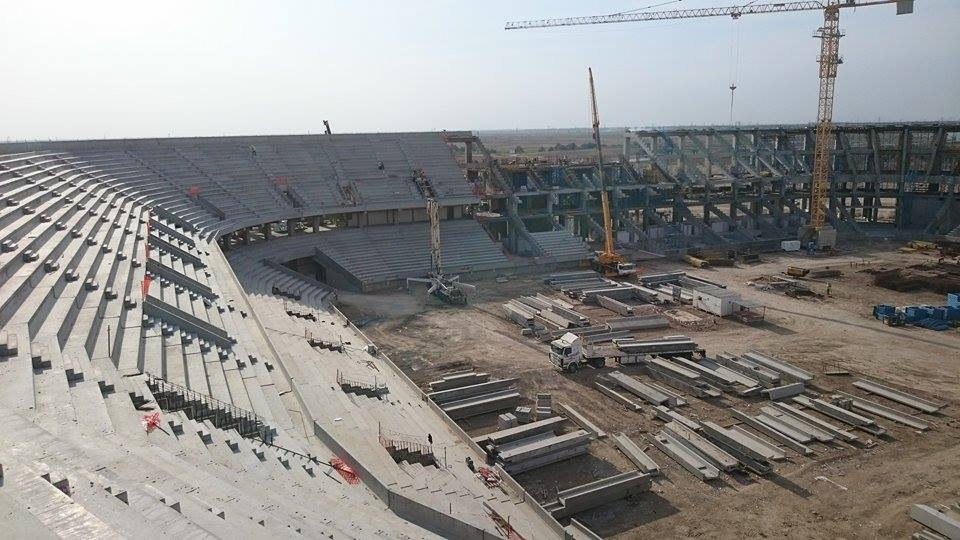
- Al Sunbula Stadium in April 2015
- Interactive map of Al Sunbula Stadium ملعب السنبلة
- Full name: Al Sunbula International Stadium
- Location: Al Diwaniyah, Iraq
- Coordinates: 31°55′38″N 44°53′59″E
- Owner: Ministry of Youth and Sports (Iraq)
- Capacity: 30,000
- Surface: Grass
- Field size: 105 m × 68 m

Construction
- Groundbreaking: December 2012
- Opened: TBD
- Cost: US$100 million
- Architect: Bahadır Kul Architects (BKA)
- Project manager: Rönesans
- General contractor: Rönesans

Tenant
- Al-Diwaniya FC

Al Sunbula Stadium (Arabic: ملعب السنبلة, lit. 'Ear Stadium') is a football-specific stadium in Al Diwaniyah, Iraq, that is currently under construction. Once completed, it will primarily be used for football matches and will serve as the home venue for Al-Diwaniya FC, replacing their current stadium, Al-Diwaniya Stadium. The stadium will have a seating capacity of 30,000 spectators and is expected to cost approximately US$100 million, with the entire funding being provided by the Iraqi government.

The basic concrete structure of the stadium was constructed between December 2012 and May 2014. However, work was subsequently halted due to financial reasons, with the progress reaching 57%. Despite economic challenges, the Ministry of Youth and Sports is making efforts to resume the work and ensure the completion of the project.

== Design ==
The project includes a main stadium that can accommodate 30,000 spectators, two training fields of 2000 and 500 spectators respectively, a 4-star hotel with 75 rooms, a store, a parking lot and landscaping areas. The entire complex is being built on an area of approximately 250,000 sqm.

== See also ==
- List of football stadiums in Iraq
