= Salah Al Din Stadium =

Football stadium in Tikrit, Iraq

Salah Al Din Stadium ملعب صلاح الدين
- Interactive map of Salah Al Din Stadium ملعب صلاح الدين
- Location: Tikrit, Iraq
- Coordinates: 34°37′24.7″N 43°37′34.5″E
- Owner: Ministry of Youth and Sports (Iraq)
- Capacity: 30,000
- Surface: Grass
- Field size: 105 m × 68 m

Construction
- Groundbreaking: April 2018
- Opened: TBD
- Cost: $ 90 million USD
- Services engineer: Panigada – Engineering s.r.i

Tenant
- Salahaddin FC

Salah Al Din Stadium (Arabic: ملعب صلاح الدين) is a football specific stadium in Tikrit, Iraq, that is currently under construction. Once completed, it will be used mostly for football matches and will host the home matches of Salahaddin FC as a replacement for their venue Tikrit Stadium. The stadium will have a capacity of 30,000 spectators and will cost approximately $90 million USD funded entirely by Iraqi government.

== Design and facilities ==
The design of the facility combines modernity and simplicity. The main stadium has a capacity of 30,000 seats and is specifically assigned to the practice of football. It does not contain an athletic track in order to provide a special visual experience for the spectators in the stadium, who are located as close to the field as possible. In parallel, the sports complex includes 2 training grounds (of 2000 and 500 seats respectively), which are equipped with running tracks. A 75-room hotel is being built within the stadium's perimeter. The entire project is expected to cover an area of 15 hectares.

== Transportation and access ==
The stadium is situated on the outskirts of the city of Tikrit on the right side of the Mosul-Baghdad highway.

== See also ==
- List of football stadiums in Iraq
