= Karagandy-Arena =

Coordinates: 49°47′27″N 73°08′10″E

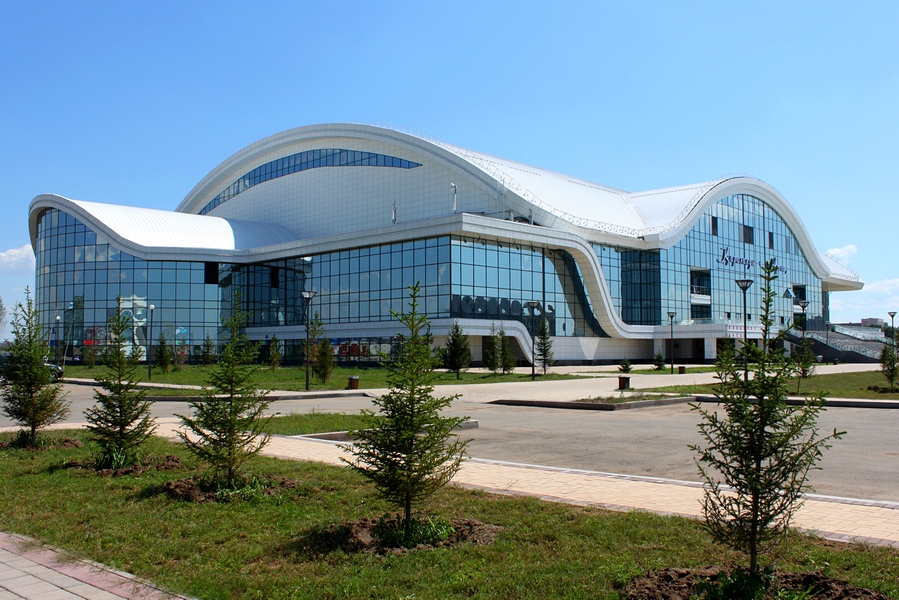
- Interactive map of Karagandy-Arena
- Location: Karaganda, Kazakhstan
- Capacity: 5,500

Construction
- Opened: November 21, 2011 (14 years ago)

Tenant
- Saryarka Karagandy (2011–present)

Karagandy-Arena (Kazakh: Қарағанды-Арена) is an ice hockey indoor arena in Karaganda, Kazakhstan. It opened in 2011 and holds approximately 5,500 people. It is primarily used for ice hockey and is the home arena of Saryarka Karagandy hockey club. It is also used for concerts, exhibitions and as a skating rink.

The first game in Karagandy Arena took place in 2012, with Barys Astana-2. Since then, it has been host to a number of events.

== See also ==
- List of indoor arenas in Kazakhstan
