= Sacramento Railyards =

Urban development project

Coordinates: 38.588122°N 121.498025°W

The Sacramento Railyards (or Railyard Specific Plan) is an urban infill project of approximately 244 acres (99 ha) at the western terminus of the first transcontinental railroad in Sacramento, California. It is located between the downtown central business district and the River District, near the confluence of the American and Sacramento rivers. The property is owned by Downtown Railyard Ventures, LLC. The Sacramento Railyards was master-planned by the Jerde Partnership firm. Construction will take 15 to 20 years, with a projected build–out to last until the late 2020s.

The site is equivalent in size to the existing downtown central business district and holds significant historical and cultural importance to Sacramento. The project features the preservation and partial reuse of the "Central Shops" buildings originally used for railroad maintenance and the former Southern Pacific Sacramento Depot; now known as Sacramento Valley Station. One of the Central Shops will be refitted into a public marketplace.

Overall, the project is expected to include 12,000 housing units, 2,900,000 square feet (270,000 m^{2}) of office uses, 1,900,000 square feet (180,000 m^{2}) of retail, hotel, and other commercial uses, 41 acres (17 ha) of parks and open space, a 25,000-seat stadium for Sacramento Republic FC, a 1.3 million square foot, 17.8 acre Kaiser Permanente flagship medical center campus, a 540,000 square-foot courthouse, and create 19,000 permanent jobs.

== History ==
The first railroad in Sacramento as well as California was the Sacramento Valley Railroad finished in 1856 and engineered by Theodore Judah. Judah's efforts to realize a transcontinental railroad was transferred to the power of "The Big Four" investors, who created the Central Pacific Railroad. The First transcontinental railroad was completed in 1869, when Central Pacific's line joined Union Pacific's at Promontory Summit. Sacramento's terminus was the primary departure station for the railroad until 1883.

Central Pacific merged with Southern Pacific in 1870, and the former's maintenance yards were expanded with the addition of the Southern Pacific shops. The shops were used for locomotive repairs, general maintenance and, occasionally, creation. The yards steadily expanded, becoming the biggest railroad facility west of the Mississippi River and employing approximately one-third of all Sacramento workers in the early decades of the 20th century.

Railroad usage in the United States gradually declined over the century, and by the beginning of the 21st century, railyard upkeep had become less economically viable and laid largely dormant. As Union Pacific took over Southern Pacific in 1996, freight service in the railyards dwindled until 1999 when Union Pacific ceased rail operations in the railyards. Large portions of the railyards were subsequently removed in the years following. In 2003, developer Millennia Associates vied to purchase the southern 70 acres (28 ha) of the railyards, hoping to eventually obtain the entire railyard from Union Pacific. Millennia's financial partner, Thomas Enterprises, eventually finalized the railyard purchase on 2006-12-29. In 2015, the 200-acre Sacramento Railyards property was sold to Downtown Railyard Ventures, LLC., with experienced local developer Larry Kelley and his partners, Denton Kelley, Jay Heckenlively, Frank Myers and Alan Hersh serving as the master development team for the project.

Environmental remediation on the site has occurred since the 1980s. The California Department of Toxic Substances Control (DTSC) and the Environmental Protection Agency have identified numerous soil and groundwater contaminants on and near the development area. The nearby Jibboom Junkyard was listed on the National Priorities List (NPL) and identified as containing metal contaminants in the soil. After remediation and NPL deletion in 1991, a 2007 review of the site assessed that while the contaminants still persist, their levels remain protective of human health concerns. Similar metal contaminants are found in the Sims Metal Recycling property in the project area. A 2007 Memorandum of understanding gives DTSC oversight over remediation procedures and ensures the site is remediated to target levels.

== Plan ==
The Sacramento Railyards plan is to create a mixed‐use urban environment that provides a range of complementary uses, including cultural, office, hospitality, sports and entertainment, retail, healthcare, educational, and open space; and a mixture of housing products, including affordable housing. The project developers seek to integrate the historically isolated and industrial Railyards area with Sacramento's downtown office, retail, tourism, residential, and government centers, as well as Old Sacramento, the River District area, and the adjacent Alkali Flat neighborhood using pedestrian and bicycle connections, roadways, and public transportation routes.

By focusing on regional employment opportunities, cultural destinations, and high‐quality residential neighborhoods, the Railyards calls for improved land use efficiency and reduced greenhouse gas emissions through a healthy jobs‐housing balance; multi‐modal connectivity; urban centers with jobs, housing, shopping, services, and transit; and green building practices. Implementation of this Plan will create a mixed‐use development consisting of regional destinations, commercial uses, office development, hotels, sports, entertainment and retail uses, with high‐density residential neighborhoods that provide opportunities to live and work in the Central City and are supported by urban parks and plazas.

== Central Shops District ==
The proposed Railyards plan includes five neighborhood districts, each with its own character, dominant land uses and regulations. The Central Shops District encompasses the area around the Historic Central Shops. The Central Shops buildings will be adaptively reused with historic/cultural-themed uses, such as a performing arts theater, exhibit space, public marketplace, art galleries, clubs and other entertainment-supporting uses, and a relatively small amount of office and retail space.
