= List of football stadiums in Romania =

The following is a list of football stadiums in Romania, ranked in order of capacity, with the minimum capacity being 4,000. Stadiums in bold are part of the 2026–27 Liga I.

== Current stadiums ==
#	Image	Stadium	Capacity	City	Home team	UEFA rank
1		**Arena Națională**	55,634	Bucharest	FC FCSB, Romania national football team	4/4 stars
2		Iftimie Ilisei Stadium	32,700	Medgidia	CS Medgidia	
3		Steaua Stadium	31,254	Bucharest	CSA Steaua București	4/4 stars
4		**Ion Oblemenco Stadium**	30,983	Craiova	Universitatea Craiova	4/4 stars
5		**Cluj Arena**	30,355	Cluj-Napoca	Universitatea Cluj	4/4 stars
6		Nicolae Rainea Stadium	23,000	Galați	—	
7		Brăila Municipal Stadium	20,154	Brăila	Dacia Unirea Brăila	
8		Drobeta-Turnu Severin Municipal Stadium	20,054	Drobeta-Turnu Severin	FC U Craiova 1948	3/4 stars
9		Ceahlăul Stadium	18,000	Piatra Neamț	Ceahlăul Piatra Neamț	3/4 stars
10		Cetate Stadium	18,000	Alba Iulia	Unirea Alba Iulia	
11		Daniel Prodan Stadium	18,000	Satu Mare	CSM Olimpia Satu Mare	
12		Bacău Municipal Stadium	17,500	Bacău	—	
13		**Dr. Constantin Rădulescu Stadium**	17,408	Cluj-Napoca	CFR Cluj	3/4 stars
14		Michael Klein Stadium	16,500	Hunedoara	Corvinul Hunedoara	
15		Petre Libardi Stadium	15,500	Petroșani	Jiul Petroșani	
16		**Ilie Oană Stadium**	15,073	Ploiești	Petrolul Ploiești	4/4 stars
17		Dinamo Stadium	15,032	Bucharest	—	
18		Cotroceni Stadium	14,542	Bucharest	—	
19		**Superbet Arena-Giulești**	14,047	Bucharest	Rapid Bucureşti	4/4 stars
20		**Oțelul Stadium**	13,932	Galați	Oțelul Galați	
21		Viitorul Stadium	13,500	Scornicești	Olt Scornicești	
22		**Francisc von Neuman Stadium**	12,584	Arad	UTA Arad	4/4 stars
23		Constantina Diță-Tomescu Stadium	12,518	Târgu Jiu	CSM Târgu Jiu	4/4 stars
24		Mircea Chivu Stadium	12,500	Reșița	CSM Reșița	
25		Iuliu Bodola Stadium	12,376	Oradea	FC Bihor Oradea	
26		**Sibiu Municipal Stadium**	12,363	Sibiu	Hermannstadt	4/4 stars
27		Buzău Municipal Stadium	12,321	Buzău	—	
28		Râmnicu Vâlcea Municipal Stadium	12,000	Râmnicu Vâlcea	Râmnicu Vâlcea	
29		FC Onești Stadium	12,000	Oneşti	—	
30		Parc Stadium	11,500	Caracal	Universitatea Craiova II	
31		Emil Alexandrescu Stadium	11,390	Iași	CSM Politehnica Iași	
32		Regie Stadium	10,020	Bucharest	Academia Germană de Fotbal (Youth)	
33		May 1 Stadium	10,000	Slatina	Slatina	
34		Turda Municipal Stadium	10,000	Turda	Sticla Arieșul Turda	
35		**Orășenesc Stadium**	10,000	Mioveni	FC Argeș Pitești	
36		Flacăra Stadium	10,000	Moreni	Flacăra Moreni	
37		Vaslui Municipal Stadium	9,240	Vaslui	CSM Vaslui	
38		Astra Stadium	9,000	Ploiești	—	
39		Silviu Ploeșteanu Stadium	8,800	Brașov	—	
40		Marin Anastasovici Stadium	8,500	Giurgiu	Dunărea Giurgiu	3/4 stars
41		Milcovul Stadium	8,500	Focșani	—	
42		Sepsi Arena	8,400	Sfântu Gheorghe	Sepsi Sfântu Gheorghe	4/4 stars
43		Eugen Popescu Stadium	8,400	Targoviste	Chindia Targoviste	3/4 stars
44		**Arcul de Triumf Stadium**	8,207	Bucharest	Dinamo București, Romania national rugby team	4/4 stars
45		Trans-Sil Stadium	8,200	Târgu Mureș	ASA Târgu Mureș	
46		Viorel Mateianu Stadium	8,000	Baia Mare	Minaur Baia Mare	
47		Gaz Metan Stadium	7,814	Mediaș	ACS Mediaș	
48		Jean Pădureanu Stadium	7,800	Bistrița	Gloria Bistrița	
49		**Botoșani Municipal Stadium**	7,782	Botoşani	FC Botoșani	
50		Areni Stadium	7,000	Suceava	Cetatea Suceava	
51		Extensiv Stadium	7,000	Craiova	—	
52		Tineretului Stadium	7,000	Urziceni	FC Unirea Urziceni	
53		Delta Municipal Stadium	6,600	Tulcea	—	
54		Colentina Stadium	6,000	Bucharest	Daco-Getica București (youth)	
55		Ion Comșa Stadium	6,000	Călărași	Dunărea Călărași	
56		Unirea Stadium	6,000	Dej	Unirea Dej	
57		**May 1 Stadium**	6,000	Slobozia	Unirea Slobozia	
58		Concordia Stadium	5,123	Chiajna	Concordia Chiajna	
59		Municipal "Solovan"	5,000	Sighetu Marmației	CSM Sighetu Marmației	
60		Sfântu Gheorghe Municipal Stadium	4,774	Sfântu Gheorghe	Sepsi Sfântu Gheorghe II	
61		**Central Stadium (Gheorghe Hagi Academy)**	4,554	Ovidiu	Farul Constanța	3/4 stars
62		Anghel Iordănescu Stadium	4,518	Voluntari	FC Voluntari	
63		**Clinceni Stadium**	4,502	Clinceni	Metaloglobus București, LPS HD Clinceni	
64		Muscelul Stadium	3,000	Câmpulung	Câmpulung Muscel	
65		**Miercurea Ciuc Municipal Stadium**	2,480	Miercurea Ciuc	Csíkszereda Miercurea Ciuc	
66		Măgura Stadium	2,450	Cisnădie	CSC 1599 Șelimbăr	
67		Comunal Stadium (Afumați)	2,000	Afumați	Afumați	
68		Tunari Stadium	1,700	Tunari	CS Tunari	
69		Central Stadium (Romanian National Football Centre)	1,600	Buftea	CS Dinamo București	
70		Metalul Stadium	1,573	Buzău	Metalul Buzău	
71		Ruși-Ciutea Sportsbase	700	Ruși-Ciutea	ACS FC Bacău	
72		Ștefan Dobay Stadium	500	Dumbrăvița	CSC Dumbrăvița	

== Planned stadiums ==
Stadium	Capacity	City	Home team	Opening
Dan Păltinișanu Stadium	32,150	Timișoara	Politehnica Timișoara	2026
Dinamo Stadium	25,059	Bucharest	Dinamo București	2026
New Gheorghe Hagi Stadium	18,190	Constanta	Farul Constanta	2025
New Oradea Stadium	16,000	Oradea	FC Bihor, Club Atletic Oradea	2027
New Nicolae Dobrin Stadium	15,200	Pitesti	Arges Pitesti	2026
New Targoviste Stadium	12,012	Targoviste	Chindia	2026
Heroes of Timișoara Arena	10,101	Timișoara	—	2026
New Hunedoara Stadium	10,100	Hunedoara	Corvinul Hunedoara	2027
New Brasov Stadium	9,716	Brasov	SR Brașov	2026
New Alexandria Stadium	5,496	Alexandria	CSM Alexandria	2025

== See also ==
- Football in Romania
- List of football clubs in Romania
- List of European stadiums by capacity
- List of association football stadiums by capacity
- Lists of stadiums
