= Ain Al-Tamur SC =

Iraqi football club

- Full name: Ain Al-Tamur Sport Club
- Founded: 2019; 7 years ago
- Ground: Ain Al-Tamur Stadium
- Capacity: 2,000
- Chairman: Ghalib Al-Aamoud
- Manager: Falah Al-Mashhadani
- League: Iraqi Third Division League
Home colours	Away colours

Ain Al-Tamur Sport Club (Arabic: نادي عين التمر الرياضي), is an Iraqi football team based in Karbala, that plays in the Iraqi Third Division League.

== Stadium ==
On March 11, 2019, the Ministry of Youth and Sports inaugurated the Ain Al-Tamur Stadium, and the opening included a huge public presence.

== Managerial history ==
- (Iraq) Fadhel Saeed
- (Iraq) Falah Al-Mashhadani

== See also ==
- 2021–22 Iraqi Third Division League
- 2022–23 Iraqi Third Division League
