= List of football stadiums in Kazakhstan =

The following is a list of football stadiums in Kazakhstan, ranked in order of capacity, with the minimum capacity being 5,000. The largest non-football stadium in Kazakhstan is the 11,578-capacity indoor stadium named Barys Arena, the home of ice hockey club HC Barys.

== Current stadiums ==
#	Image	Stadium	Capacity	City	Home team	Opened	UEFA rank
1		Astana Arena	30,244	Astana	FC Astana	2009	4/4 stars
2		Almaty Central Stadium	23,804	Almaty	Kairat	1958	4/4 stars
3		Kazhymukan Munaitpasov Stadium	20,000	Shymkent	Ordabasy	1969	2/4 stars
4		Shakhtyor Stadium	19,500	Karagandy	Shakhter	1958	2/4 stars
5		Aktobe Central Stadium	13,500	Aktobe	Aktobe	1975	3/4 stars
6		Taraz Central Stadium	12,525	Taraz	Taraz	1936	
7		K.Munaitpasov, Astana	12,350	Astana	Astana	1936	
8		Metallurg Stadium	12,000	Temirtau	Bolat	1949	
9		Pavlodar Central Stadium	12,000	Pavlodar	Irtysh	1947	
10		Kaysar Arena	11,000	Kyzylorda	FC Kaysar	2025	4/4 stars
11		Avangard Stadium	11,000	Petropavl	Kyzylzhar	1964	
12		Munayshy Stadium	8,660	Atyrau	Atyrau	1950	
13		Vostok Stadium	8,500	Oskemen	Vostok	1963	
14		Kostanay Central Stadium	8,323	Kostanay	Tobol	1964	
15		Petr Atoyan Stadium	8,320	Oral	Akzhayik	1927	
16		Spartak Stadium	8,000	Semey	FC Yelimay	1966	
17		Turkistan Arena	7,000	Turkistan	FC Turan	2020	
18		Gany Muratbayev Stadium	6,800	Kyzylorda	Kaisar	1968	
19		Shakhtyor Stadium	6,300	Ekibastuz	Ekibastuz	1970	
20		Zhetysu Stadium	5,500	Taldykorgan	Zhetysu	1982	

== Future stadiums ==
=== Under construction ===
Stadium	Capacity	City	Home team	Opening	Notes
Shymkent Stadium	35,000	Shymkent	FC Ordabasy	2028	
Yelimai Stadium	20,000	Semey	FC Yelimay	2026	

=== Proposed ===
Stadium	Capacity	City	Home team	Opening	Notes
Aktobe Stadium	35,000	Aktobe	FC Aktobe	2028	
Almaty Stadium	45,000	Almaty	FC Kairat	2028	
Atyrau Stadium	12,000	Atyrau	FC Atyrau	2026	
Soldier Beach Stadium	8,000	Aktau	FC Caspiy	2028	

== See also ==
- Lists of stadiums
