= Halabja Stadium =

Stadium in Iraq

Halabja Stadium یاریگای ھەڵەبجە ملعب حلبجة
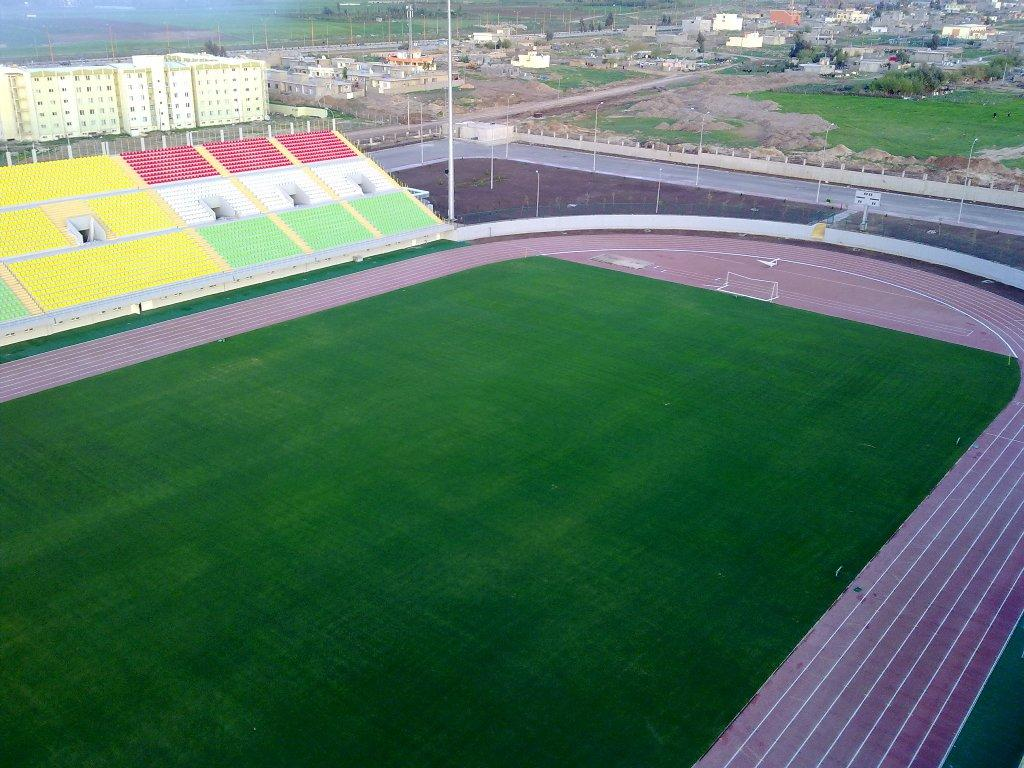
- Interactive map of Halabja Stadium یاریگای ھەڵەبجە ملعب حلبجة
- Location: Halabja, Iraq
- Coordinates: 35°12′13″N 45°57′41″E
- Owner: Kurdistan Regional Government
- Capacity: 9,000
- Surface: Grass
- Scoreboard: Yes
- Field size: 105 m × 68 m

Construction
- Opened: 2009

Tenant
- Halabja SC

Halabja Stadium (Kurdish: یاریگای ھەڵەبجە, Arabic: ملعب حلبجة) is a multi-purpose stadium in Halabja, Northern Iraq. It is currently used mostly for football matches and serves as the home stadium of Halabja SC. The stadium holds 9,000 people.

== See also ==
- List of football stadiums in Iraq
