= Yuhang International Sports Center =

Football stadium and sports complex in Hangzhou, China

Hangzhou Yuhang International Sports Center
- 杭州余杭国际体育中心
- Interactive map of Hangzhou Yuhang International Sports Center
- Location: Future Science and Technology Cultural District, Yuhang District, Hangzhou, China
- Coordinates: 30.265120°N 119.993170°E
- Capacity: 60,000 (stadium); 18,000 (indoor arena); 3,000 (aquatics center)
- Surface: Natural grass
- Public transit: 3 5 16 at Lvting Road

Construction
- Groundbreaking: October 2023
- Opened: April 2027 (planned)
- Architect: Zaha Hadid Architects
- General contractor: China Construction Third Engineering Bureau

Tenant
- Zhejiang Professional F.C. (planned)

The Hangzhou Yuhang International Sports Center (Chinese: 杭州余杭国际体育中心), often shortened to simply Yuhang International Sports Center, is an under-construction sports complex which includes a 60,000-seat football-specific stadium in Yuhang, Hangzhou, China. Designed by Zaha Hadid Architects (ZHA), the complex also includes an 18,000-seat indoor arena and a 3,000-seat aquatics center. Construction began in October 2023 and is projected to finish by April 2027.

== Design and architecture ==
The stadium’s design draws inspiration from Hangzhou’s terraced tea fields.
