= Barys Arena =

Sports venue in Astana, Kazakhstan

- Interactive map of Barys Arena
- Location: Astana, Kazakhstan
- Coordinates: 51°09′21″N 71°27′55″E
- Capacity: Ice hockey: 11,578

Construction
- Groundbreaking: October 2012; 14 years ago
- Built: 2012–2015; 11 years ago
- Opened: 9 August 2015; 11 years ago
- Architect: IT Engineering S.A.
- General contractor: Mabco Constructions S.A.

Tenants
- Barys Astana (KHL) (2015–present); 2017 Winter Universiade

Barys Arena (Kazakh: Барыс Арена; Barys Arena; Russian: Барыс Арена) is a multi-purpose indoor arena located in Astana, Kazakhstan. It serves as a home arena for Barys Astana in the Kontinental Hockey League (KHL). The arena seats 11,578 spectators for ice hockey.

== History ==
The arena owes its existence to the Kontinental Hockey League, whose inspectors indicated that Barys needed a modern home. Rather than renovating the older facility, a new venue was chosen. Although the building opened to visitors in August 2015, its first KHL championship game came later, on 28 October 2015, when Barys hosted the reigning champion, SKA Saint Petersburg. The league's inspection team confirmed its final approval only a day before that match.

Barys Arena hosted the ice hockey competitions of the 2017 Winter Universiade and has also served as a venue for international sporting competitions and cultural events. The complex includes an Olympic-standard swimming and diving pool, while its main ice rink can be converted to accommodate other events.

The arena was officially opened by President Nursultan Nazarbayev in August 2015. Its main ice rink is designed to be converted for basketball, volleyball, futsal and boxing events, as well as concerts and cultural performances. The complex also includes a 50-metre swimming pool, a diving pool and a dedicated children's and youth sports school.

== Facility ==
With about 12,000 seats, the arena became the first venue of that size in Kazakhstan. The complex includes 14 dressing rooms and an additional practice rink. A large video cube hangs above the center of the ice and broadcasts the match, while plasma screens placed throughout the corridors give spectators further viewing options away from their seats.

== See also ==
- List of indoor arenas in Kazakhstan
- List of European ice hockey arenas
- List of indoor arenas by capacity

Preceded by Kazakhstan Sports Palace	Home of the Barys Astana; 2015 – present	Succeeded by current
