= Chongxian Subdistrict =

Chongxian Subdistrict 崇贤街道
- Subdistrict
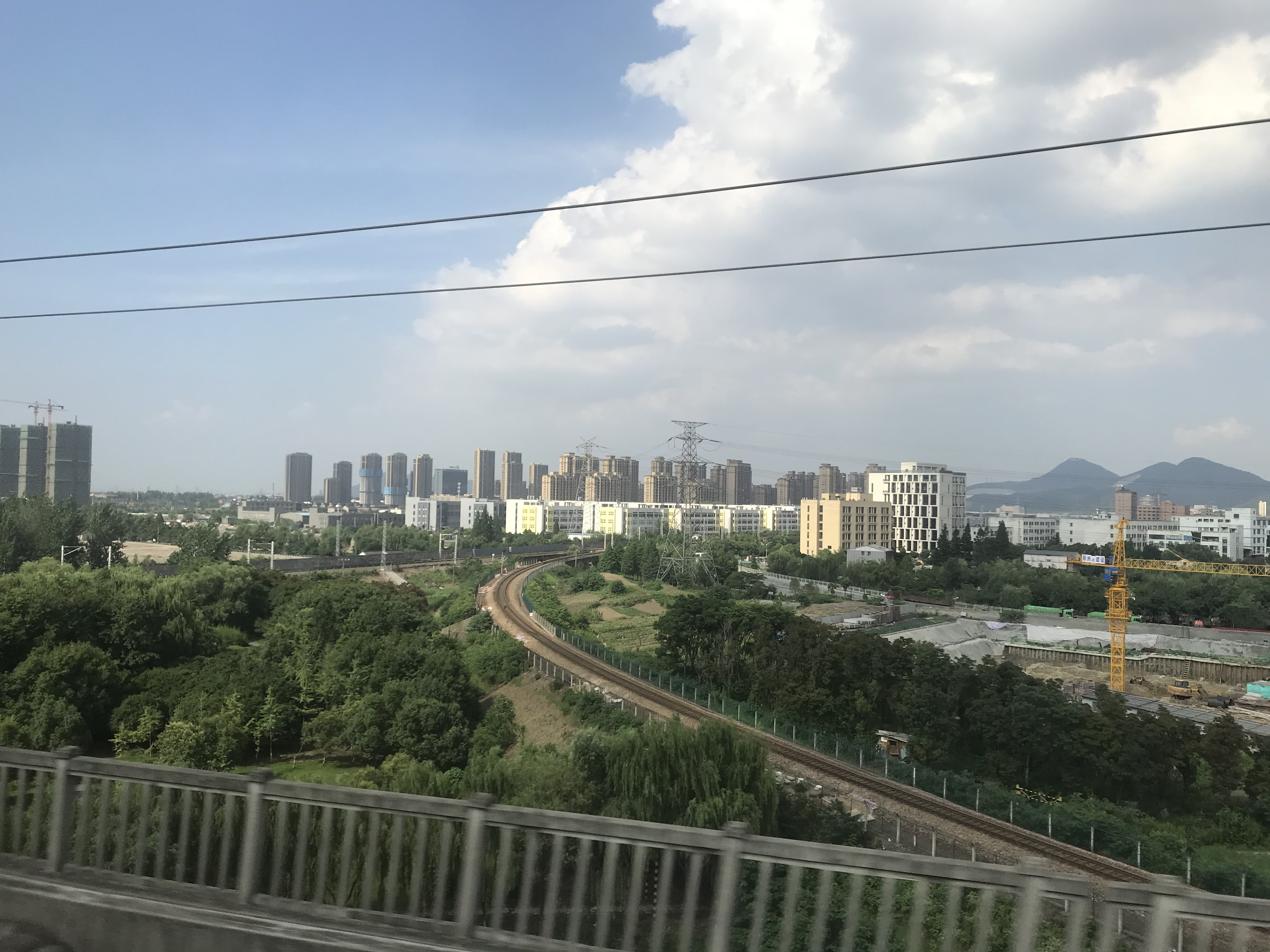
- Chongxian Subdistrict in 2018

- Location in Zhejiang
- Coordinates: 30°23′24″N 120°10′13″E
- Country: China
- Province: Zhejiang
- Prefecture-level city: Hangzhou
- District: Yuhang District

Area
  - Total: 38.6 km^{2} (14.9 sq mi)

Population
  - Total: 39,000
- Time zone: UTC+8 (China Standard Time)

Chongxian Subdistrict (Chinese: 崇贤街道; pinyin: Chóngxián Jiēdào) is a subdistrict under the jurisdiction of Yuhang District, Hangzhou, Zhejiang Province, People's Republic of China.

== Administrative divisions ==
As of 2020, it administers the following four residential communities and eleven villages:

- Qiancun Community (前村社区)
- Chonghang Community (崇杭社区)
- Chongwen Community (崇文社区)
- Yangjiabang Community (杨家浜社区)
- Chongxian Village
- Xiangyang Village (向阳村)
- Da'an Village (大安村)
- Zhanqiao Village (沾桥村)
- Yalan Village (鸭兰村)
- Beizhuang Village (北庄村)
- Lujiaqiao Village (陆家桥村)
- Sanjia Village (三家村)
- Yanshan Village (沿山村)
- Siwei Village (四维村)
- Longxuan Village (龙旋村)

== Geography ==
Chongxian Subdistrict is bordered to the west by China National Highway 320 to the east and the Grand Canal to the west. It is 12 kilometers away from the city center of Hangzhou.

== Economy ==
It has the largest poultry and egg production base in Hangzhou. It has cultivated high-quality agricultural products such as "Sanjiacun" lotus root noodles and "Shunfengxiang" egg products, and has taken the lead in establishing professional aquatic crop cooperatives and professional poultry and eggs cooperatives in the whole district.

In 2004, the town achieved an agricultural output value of 230 million yuan, and the per capita income of farmers reached 8,620 yuan.

== See also ==
- List of township-level divisions of Zhejiang
