= Republic FC Stadium =

Soccer stadium under construction in Sacramento, California

- Artist's rendering; view from the northeast
- Interactive map of Republic FC Stadium
- Location: Sacramento Railyards, Sacramento, California
- Coordinates: 38.5903°N 121.4909°W
- Owner: Sacramento Republic FC
- Operator: Sacramento Republic FC
- Capacity: 20,000
- Type: Soccer-specific stadium
- Surface: Grass
- Public transit: at Sacramento Valley; Green at 7th & Railyards

Construction
- Groundbreaking: August 18, 2025
- Opened: 2028 (planned)
- Cost: $252 million
- Architect: HNTB

Tenant
- Sacramento Republic FC (USLC)

Republic FC Stadium at The Railyards, also known as simply Republic FC Stadium, is a 20,000-seat soccer-specific stadium currently under construction in Sacramento, California. It will serve as the home for Sacramento Republic FC, a USL Championship club. The stadium is part of the Sacramento Railyards redevelopment project and it was unanimously approved in April 2019 by the Sacramento City Council,

The stadium's design and construction timeline have been heavily edited throughout the years. The stadium was scheduled to be completed by the start of the 2023 MLS season, before the MLS expansion was indefinitely halted in February 2021. In November 2024, Sacramento Republic FC and the mayor of Sacramento Darrell Steinberg announced a restart plans for construction of a 12,000 seater stadium and entertainment district in Sacramento Railyards. An additional amendment to this plan saw the stadium plans transform the stadium to a 20,000+ seat soccer-first venue, forgoing the original plans to grow through phased expansion.

The tentative opening of the new stadium is 2028.

== History ==
In late 2011, a group led by former California Assembly Speaker Fabian Núñez began exploring the possibility of having an MLS team in the Sacramento area, originally looking at stadium sites in the suburb of Elk Grove. Sacramento Republic FC was announced as a 2014 expansion team for the second-division United Soccer League on December 3, 2012. Local business leaders, including Warren Smith, hoped to convert the franchise to a Major League Soccer team by 2016. On September 17, 2014, the team announced its intentions to acquire property at the Sacramento Railyards infill project for a soccer stadium. More details of the stadium were announced in late 2015: HNTB was hired as the lead architects of the stadium, and the design of the stadium (partially influenced by fan input) was revealed on December 1, 2015. The official go-ahead from the City Council was given on November 10, 2016. However, the construction of the stadium was delayed as the team did not have an investor who satisfied the requirements of MLS. On January 22, 2019, Pittsburgh Penguins co-owner Ron Burkle was announced as the investor needed for MLS promotion. Around two months later, the stadium design was updated; additions to the old design included a 360-degree concourse/pedestrian walkway, new seating at the canopy level on the west side of the stadium, and additional field-level seating areas. The cost for the stadium was raised to approximately $252 million. Following the expansion announcement, construction on the stadium was expected to begin in 2020 ahead of a 2022 opening, but the COVID-19 pandemic delayed the move to MLS to 2023. The MLS expansion bid was placed on hold in March 2021 after Burkle left the ownership group.

In April 2022, the team announced plans for a downsized stadium on the site. The revised stadium plan, which is not contingent on the revival of the MLS bid, calls for a 12,000-15,000 seat facility that can be expanded in the future should demand warrant it.

On November 7, 2024, during an announcement that announced the team had been sold to the Wilton Rancheria tribe, plans to restart development on the site were announced, with a capacity of 12,000 that could be expanded to 20,000 should MLS move forward with expansion plans in Sacramento. The new plan calls for $175 million to be directed to the site and $42 million on surrounding infrastructure on the 31-acre site. The stadium and entertainment district are planned to be opened by 2027.

Sacramento City Council unanimously voted to approve construction on the stadium on June 10, 2025.

== Design ==
Approval for a new Sacramento Stadium at The Railyards site was given in 2016. The working stadium design for the expansion bid to MLS was unveiled in April 2019. It was designed with a closed bowl to have separate stands on different sides, creating a distinct character for each one, reminiscent of St James' Park. The seating was to feature the steepest grade in the league, as well as an untiered east side that would have borne similarities to Westfalenstadion's Yellow Wall.

In April 2022, a new release of renderings showed a pared down stadium with four free-standing stands at each side of the pitch. No roof structure is present. Main circulation around the stadium is at ground level, but there are connectors between all four stands at an elevated level.

By late March 2026, Wilton Rancheria and Sacramento Republic FC announced that Republic Stadium at The Railyards will be constructed as a 20,000+ seat soccer-first venue, forgoing the original plans to grow through phased expansion and building out the whole stadium during the current construction period.

== Major events ==
=== College soccer ===
On October 14, 2020, the NCAA announced that the stadium would host the semifinals and finals of the NCAA College Cup soccer tournament in 2024 and 2025; the men's tournament in 2024 and the Women's College Cup in 2025. However, when stadium construction was halted in 2021, these events were moved to WakeMed Soccer Park, home of fellow USL Championship club North Carolina FC.
