= New İzmir Atatürk Stadium =

Proposed multi-purpose stadium in İzmir, Turkey

Coordinates: 38°26′5.50″N 27°10′40.33″E

- Interactive map of New İzmir Atatürk Stadium
- Location: İzmir, Turkey
- Owner: Izmir City Council
- Capacity: 55,000
- Surface: Grass

The New İzmir Atatürk Stadium is a proposed multi-purpose stadium in İzmir, Turkey that would replace the İzmir Atatürk Stadium.

== Euro 2016 ==
The stadium was originally proposed to be built in the Kemalpaşa district of İzmir as one of the nine candidate host stadiums for the Turkish bid to host Euro 2016. The stadium would have had a capacity of nearly 41,540 people (all-seated).

The stadium would have been known as “Ege’nin Gözbebeği” (the Pupil of the Aegean) and located on a hill north of İzmir Bay. The architecture of the stadium was inspired by historical influences of Hellenic and Roman architecture, which have dominated this part of Turkey for millennia.

The recessed glazed façade and the base construction of the stadium were derived from the appearance of ancient Roman coliseums while the upper tier was a modern interpretation of a Hellenic amphitheatre. This tier would have taken the form of a horseshoe, opening towards the South and offering a view over the bay to the city center.
