= Yuhang, Hangzhou =

Yuhang 余杭区
- District
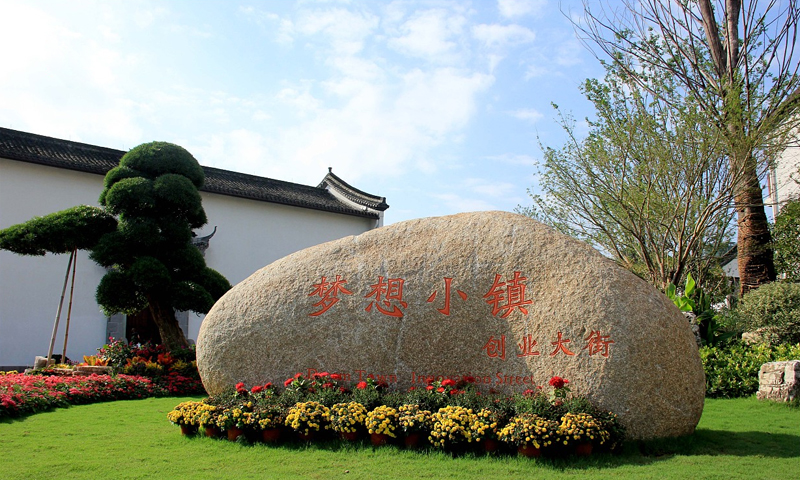
- Dream Town of Hangzhou Future Sci-Tech City

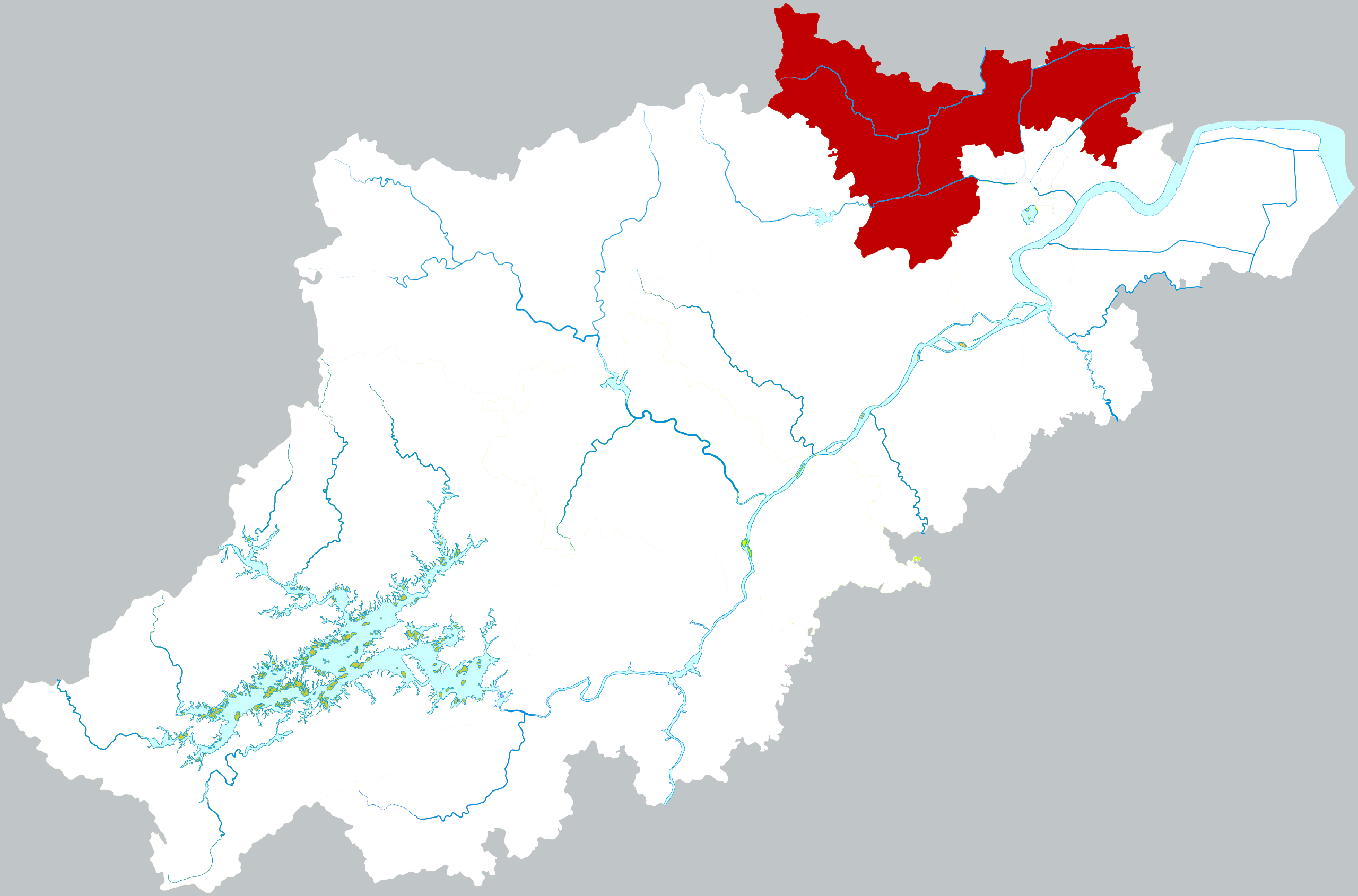
- Location of Yuhang District within Hangzhou

- Location in Zhejiang
- Coordinates: 30°09′N 119°40′E
- Country: People's Republic of China
- Province: Zhejiang
- Sub-provincial city: Hangzhou

Area
  - Total: 1,228.41 km^{2} (474.29 sq mi)

Population (2022)
  - Total: 1,390,900
  - Density: 1,132.3/km^{2} (2,932.6/sq mi)
- Time zone: UTC+8 (China Standard)

Yuhang, Hangzhou
- Simplified Chinese: 余杭区
- Traditional Chinese: 餘杭區
Transcriptions
Standard Mandarin
- Hanyu Pinyin: Yúháng Qū

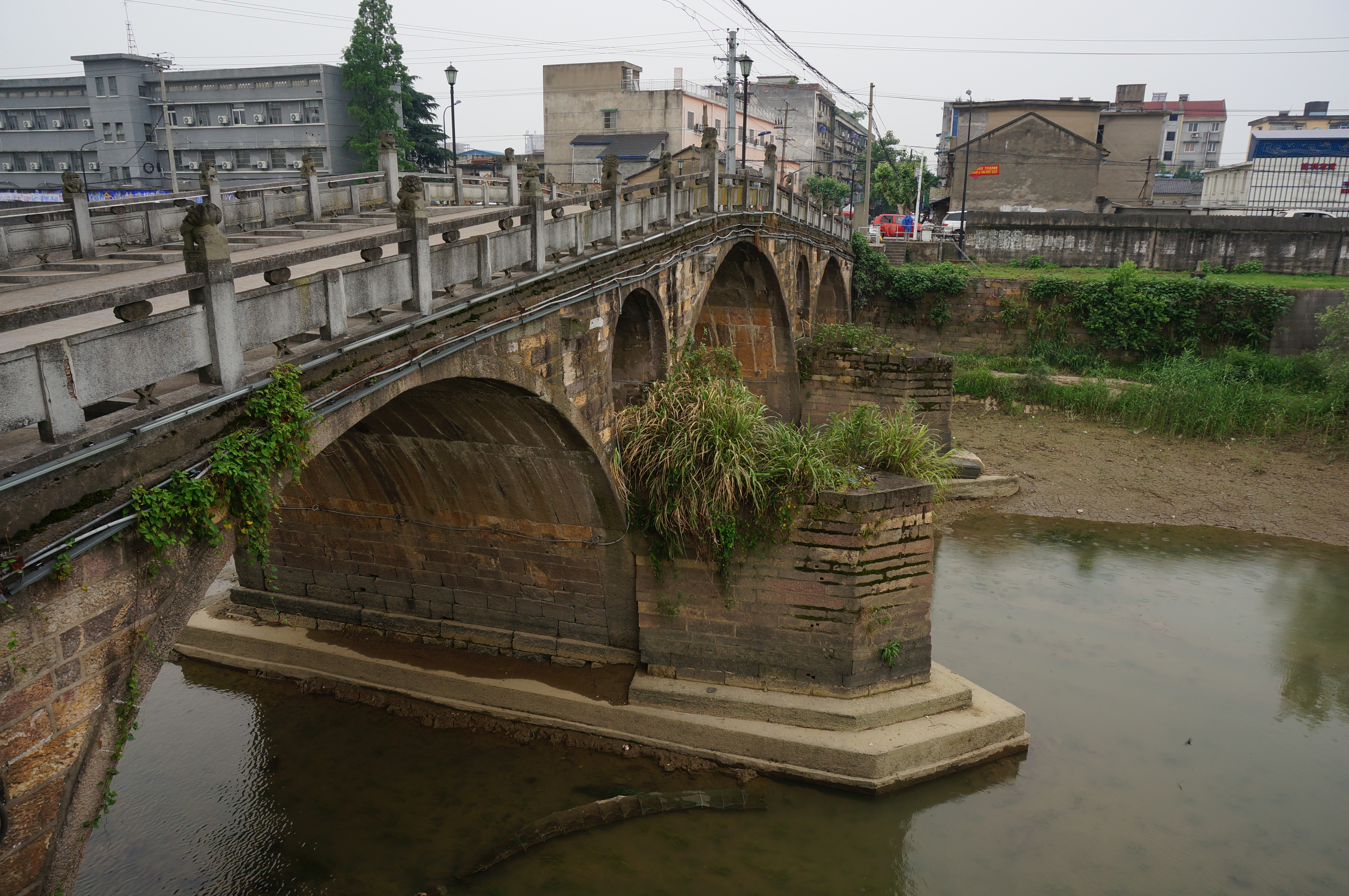
Old Yuhang

Yuhang is a suburban district of Hangzhou, Zhejiang, China.

On April 9, 2021, Linping District was established, consisting of the former Yuhang subdistricts of Linping, Donghu, Nanyuan, Xingqiao, Yunhe, Qiaosi, Chongxian and the Town of Tangxi.

Yuhang is the largest district of Hangzhou. The administration center of Yuhang District is Linping, which is a subcenter of Hangzhou located in the northeast side of downtown area. It connects with the downtown via Metro Line 3.

== History ==
The district contains the remains of Neolithic settlements from the Liangzhu period.

Prior to the expansion of modern Hangzhou, Yuhang formed a separate city. It is the earliest settlement recorded in the area of present-day Hangzhou. Chinese scholars traditionally interpreted its name as a mistake for "Yu's Ferry" (禹航; Yǔháng), after the legendary account of Yu the Great's gathering of his lords at Mount Kuaiji around 2000 BC. This is now thought to be a folk etymology and Yuhang (Old Chinese: *La-gang) is almost certainly an ancient transliteration of an old Baiyue name.

Yuhang was part of Kuaiji Commandery prior to the growth of Hangzhou following the 7th-century construction of the Sui's Grand Canal. It was then administered from Hangzhou.

== Administrative divisions ==
Subdistricts:

- Renhe Subdistrict (仁和街道), Liangzhu Subdistrict (良渚街道), Wuchang Subdistrict (五常街道), Yuhang Subdistrict (余杭街道), Xianlin Subdistrict (闲林街道), Cangqian Subdistrict (仓前街道), Zhongtai Subdistrict (中泰街道)

Towns:

- Pingyao (瓶窑镇), Jingshan (径山镇), Luniao (鸬鸟镇), Huanghu (黄湖镇), Baizhang (百丈镇)

== Features ==
The famous tourist attractions here include Liangzhu Culture Museum, Jingshan Tea and Buddhist Monastery, Tangxi Ancient Town, The Grand Canal, Chaoshan Scenic Area, Tianducheng Resorts and Xixi National Wetland Park.

== See also ==
- Yuhang International Sports Center
