= New CR Flamengo Stadium =

Planned stadium in Rio de Janeiro, Brazil

- Location: Rio de Janeiro, Brazil
- Owner: Flamengo
- Operator: Flamengo
- Capacity: 72,000 (estimated)

Construction
- Groundbreaking: 2025 (planned)
- Built: 2025–2036 (estimated)
- Opened: 15 November 2036 (planned)
- Cost: R$2.2 billion (estimated) (US$ 410.5 million)

Tenant
- Flamengo (planned)

The New Flamengo Stadium is an association football stadium currently under planning and construction in the São Cristóvão neighborhood of Rio de Janeiro, Brazil. It is set to be the future home of Clube de Regatas do Flamengo, with an expected opening date of 15 November 2036 or later.

== History ==
The land designated for the stadium was officially expropriated by the city of Rio de Janeiro in June 2024. After a public auction, Flamengo purchased the site for R$ 169 million, resolving a legal dispute with Caixa Econômica Federal. The location, near the new Gentileza Intermodal Terminal, was chosen for its strategic accessibility and potential to boost local commerce.

== Design ==
The stadium will feature a vertical structure, with a height of 60 meters (equivalent to a 20-story building), surpassing traditional stadiums like the Maracanã, Camp Nou, and Santiago Bernabéu in overall height. Despite its size, the furthest seats will be approximately 10% closer to the pitch compared to the Maracanã.

Designed with flexibility in mind, the venue will include larger locker rooms and facilities, which makes it capable of hosting National Football League (NFL) games.

A 50-meter-tall flagpole with a giant Flamengo flag will be a visual landmark at the site.

== Financing ==
The estimated construction cost is approximately R$3 billion, which would make it the most expensive stadium ever built in Brazil. Funding sources include expected naming rights revenue (projected at R$1.5 billion over 20 years) and the sale of Flamengo’s building rights at its Gávea headquarters.

== Economic Impact ==
According to studies by the City of Rio de Janeiro, the stadium could generate R$5.3 billion in economic activity over 10 years. The project is expected to revitalize the Gasômetro area, stimulate local commerce, and create hundreds of new jobs.
