= Sacramento Republic FC =

American professional soccer club

Sacramento Republic
- Full name: Sacramento Republic Football Club
- Nicknames: Republic, The Quails
- Founded: 2012; 14 years ago
- Stadium: Heart Health Park
- Capacity: 11,569
- Owners: Wilton Rancheria (majority); Kevin M. Nagle (minority)
- Head coach: Neill Collins
- League: USL Championship
- 2026: 2nd, Western Conference; Playoffs: Champions
- Website: sacrepublicfc.com
Home colors	Away colors

Sacramento Republic FC is an American professional soccer team based in Sacramento, California, that competes in the Western Conference of the USL Championship, the second level in US soccer. Co-founded by Warren Smith and Joe Wagoner in 2012, the team started play in 2014 at the 20,231-seat Hughes Stadium, before moving midseason to their current home at Heart Health Park. Republic FC won the 2014 and 2026 USL championships and have made the playoffs twelve times.

The team submitted an expansion bid for the top level Major League Soccer in January 2017. On May 15, 2017, MLS bid proponent Sac Soccer & Entertainment Holdings, led by Kevin Nagle, officially acquired Sacramento Republic FC from president and co-founder Warren Smith. On October 21, 2019, MLS announced that Sacramento Republic would be the 29th team in MLS, originally slated to start in 2022, and later pushed to 2023. However, on February 26, 2021, the expansion to the MLS was placed on indefinite hiatus. The team is working with the City of Sacramento to build a new stadium in the large Railyards urban infill project. In the interim, St. Louis City SC began play in 2023 and that year, San Diego FC was awarded a franchise to begin play in 2025.

== History ==
On December 3, 2012, USL Pro announced that a Sacramento expansion team would join the league for the 2014 season. On July 15, 2013, Predrag "Preki" Radosavljević was announced as head coach of the new franchise. The official name of the team and team shield were decided by fan vote. On July 18, 2013, the franchise officially announced the team name Sacramento Republic FC during the first annual Sacramento Soccer Day. As of April 2015, the team had sold more than 9,500 season-tickets.

=== 2014: First-year championship ===
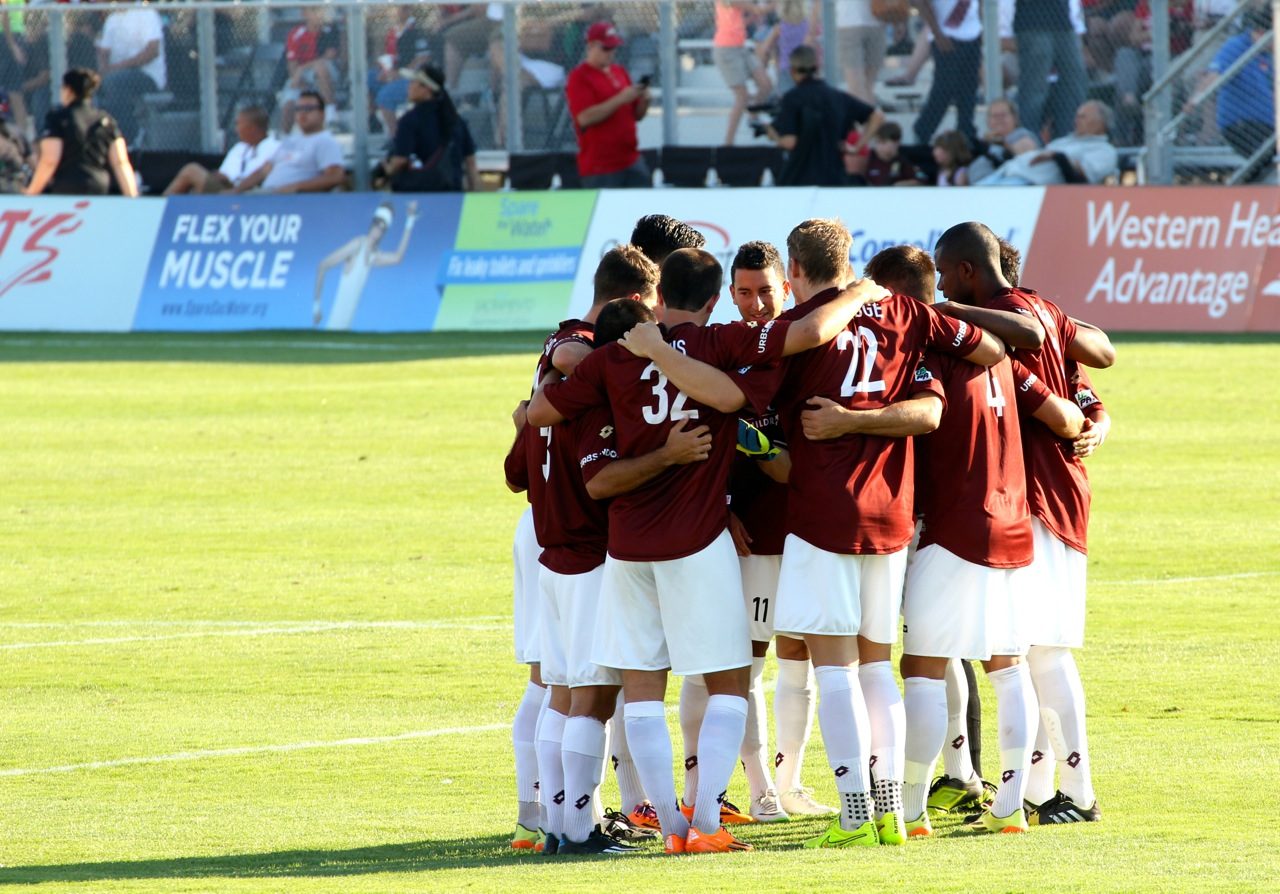
Republic huddle before second half of a friendly against Atlas FC in 2014

Republic FC made their home debut on April 26, 2014, at Hughes Stadium, losing 2–1 to the Harrisburg City Islanders, before a sellout crowd of 20,231. This figure nearly doubled the previous USL regular season single game attendance record of 10,697. The following match, a 2–1 win over Orange County Blues FC, drew a slightly smaller crowd of 17,414. Eventually, all their home games were sellouts except this one.

Republic FC inaugurated their new 8,000 seat, soccer-specific stadium, Bonney Field at Cal Expo, on June 20, 2014. They defeated the Colorado Rapids Reserve team 4–3. Mike Fucito scored the winning goal in the 84th minute.

On July 27, 2014, the team broke the USL regular season attendance record of 112,748, previously set by Orlando City SC. Their total attendance was 182,107 (158,107 regular season; 24,000 in the playoffs).

Republic FC finished the regular season in 2nd place behind Orlando City SC with a 17-win, 4-tie and 7-loss record. They defeated the Wilmington Hammerheads 4–1 in the Quarterfinals. Rodrigo López scored a hat trick, including the game-winner in stoppage time, to defeat LA Galaxy II 3–2 in the Semifinals—a comeback victory dubbed "The Miracle at Bonney" by Republic fans. Sacramento won the USL Championship by defeating the Harrisburg City Islanders 2–0 on goals from Octavio Guzman and Thomas Stewart. López was named the Championship MVP. Preki was named Coach of the Year. Nemanja Vuković was named Defender of the Year. Both López and Vuković were named to the All-League First Team.

=== 2015–2021 ===
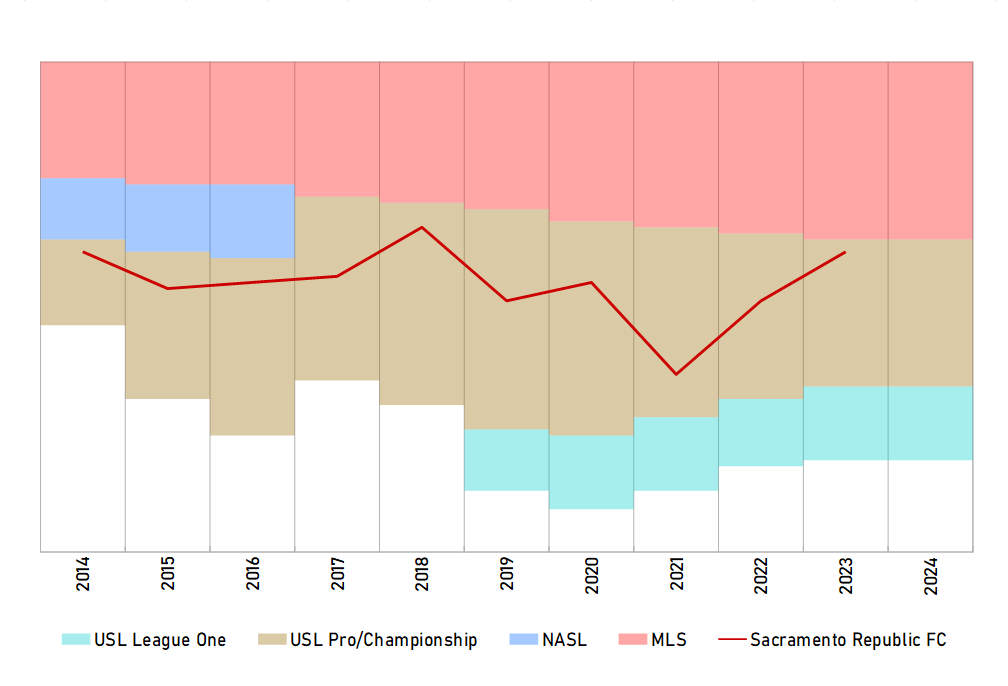
Historical chart of Sacramento Republic's regular season performance within the American soccer pyramid

Republic FC's second season saw them play in an expanded Bonney Field. 2015 also saw the business arm of the NFL side San Francisco 49ers and also NBA side Sacramento Kings venture into soccer, investing in Sacramento Republic in January 2015 with future plans should the club venture into the MLS as a franchise.

Sacramento lost their first game of the season 4–2 away to Seattle Sounders FC 2. They soon picked up form and saw them beat Sonoma County Sol and Chula Vista FC 4–2 and 7–3 respectively in the US Open Cup to reach the Fourth Round two years running. On July 7, the Republic announced that Head-Coach Preki would be leaving and was being replaced by Paul Buckle. Buckle's first game with the Republic was a friendly with Premier League side Sunderland on July 14, which Sacramento won 1–0.

Sacramento placed fourth in the USL Western Conference standings after a season-concluding draw with conference champions Orange County Blues. The Republic qualified for playoffs for the second consecutive year, losing to LA Galaxy II 1–0 in the first round.

On January 22, 2019, billionaire Ron Burkle, the lead investor in the Pittsburgh Penguins ice hockey team since 1999, was announced as the Sacramento Republic's lead investor to satisfy MLS requirements.

On September 19, 2019, Sacramento Republic FC was reported to be entering MLS as its 29th team, sources told CBS Sports. MLS called the report "erroneous" stating that they were still in "advanced discussions". A press conference was held on October 21, 2019, to award an expansion team to Sacramento with Sacramento Republic FC slated to begin play in 2022. Due to delays relating to the COVID-19 pandemic in California. Sacramento Republic and MLS announced that the team would instead play in 2023. On February 26, 2021, MLS then announced that lead investor Ron Burkle "had decided not to acquire an expansion team in Sacramento", and the Republic's bid to join MLS as an expansion team was placed on indefinite hold. Republic's 2021 troubles were not limited to off the pitch; the club missed the playoffs for the first time in its history, finishing 13th in the Western Conference with an 8W-12D-12L record.

=== 2022: Open Cup runners-up ===
With the return of the U.S. Open Cup after a two-year hiatus forced by the pandemic, the Republic made a historic run through the 2022 edition, becoming the first team from outside Major League Soccer to play for the trophy since Charleston Battery in 2008, and only the fourth since MLS began play in 1996. Sacramento defeated teams from four divisions of the United States soccer pyramid—Portland Timbers U23s of Open Division USL League Two, Central Valley Fuego FC of Division III USL League One, fellow Division II USLC side Phoenix Rising FC, and MLS clubs San Jose Earthquakes, LA Galaxy, and Sporting Kansas City—before falling to MLS side Orlando City, 3–0, in the final. The Open Cup run has also inspired hopes of reviving the Republic's MLS expansion bid through a new group of investors.

== Colors and crest ==
Republic FC's colors are old glory red, maple, and egg shell. The club crest is a classic shield that honors the Bear Flag, taking several colors from the flag itself. The crest also carries an image of a California grizzly bear, which is found on the state's flag and is California's official state animal, along with a nautical star, which is representative of, and in the same color as, the star on the Bear Flag. Below the bear is the motto of the city of Sacramento, "Urbs Indomita", in Latin meaning "Indomitable City".

== Kit ==
The club released the design of their inaugural home and away shirts on December 5, 2013. The kit manufacturer was Italian sportswear company Lotto, with UC Davis Children's Hospital as the shirt sponsor through the 2016 season. The home kit's dominant color is the club's signature color "Old Glory Red", and the away shirt is primarily white. Both Lotto kits featured a diagonal stripe of dark maroon, with the club crest positioned on the left side of the wearer's chest. The club's motto, "Urbs Indomita", was printed on the right sleeve. The third kit, unveiled before the 2015 season and US Open Cup, featured horizontal eggshell and white stripes and a star over the crest to commemorate the previous season's USL Championship.

On November 21, 2015, Republic FC announced a new partnership with Nike and unveiled new home and away kits for the 2016 USL season. The home kit is once again "Old Glory Red," while the away kit is now white and gray. Both designs omit the diagonal stripe in favor of vertical patterns. The new designs feature "Urbs Indomita" written on the back neckline.

UC Davis Children's Hospital, the kit sponsor since the club's inception and one of Republic FC's first corporate partners, renewed their sponsorship on July 22, 2016, for USL play beyond the year 2016. Moreover, UC Davis Health Systems announced it would become the shirt sponsor in MLS should Republic receive an expansion bid.

=== Kit history ===
Home, away, and third kits.

- Home

2014	2015	2016–17	2018–19	2020–22	2023	2024	2025–

- Away

2014	2015	2016–17	2018–19	2020–22	2023	2024–25	2026–

- Third

2015	2019	2021	2022	2023

=== Sponsorship ===
Period	Kit manufacturer	Shirt sponsor
2014–2015	Lotto	UC Davis Health
2016–2022	Nike	UC Davis Health
2023–present	Hummel	UC Davis Health

== Supporters ==
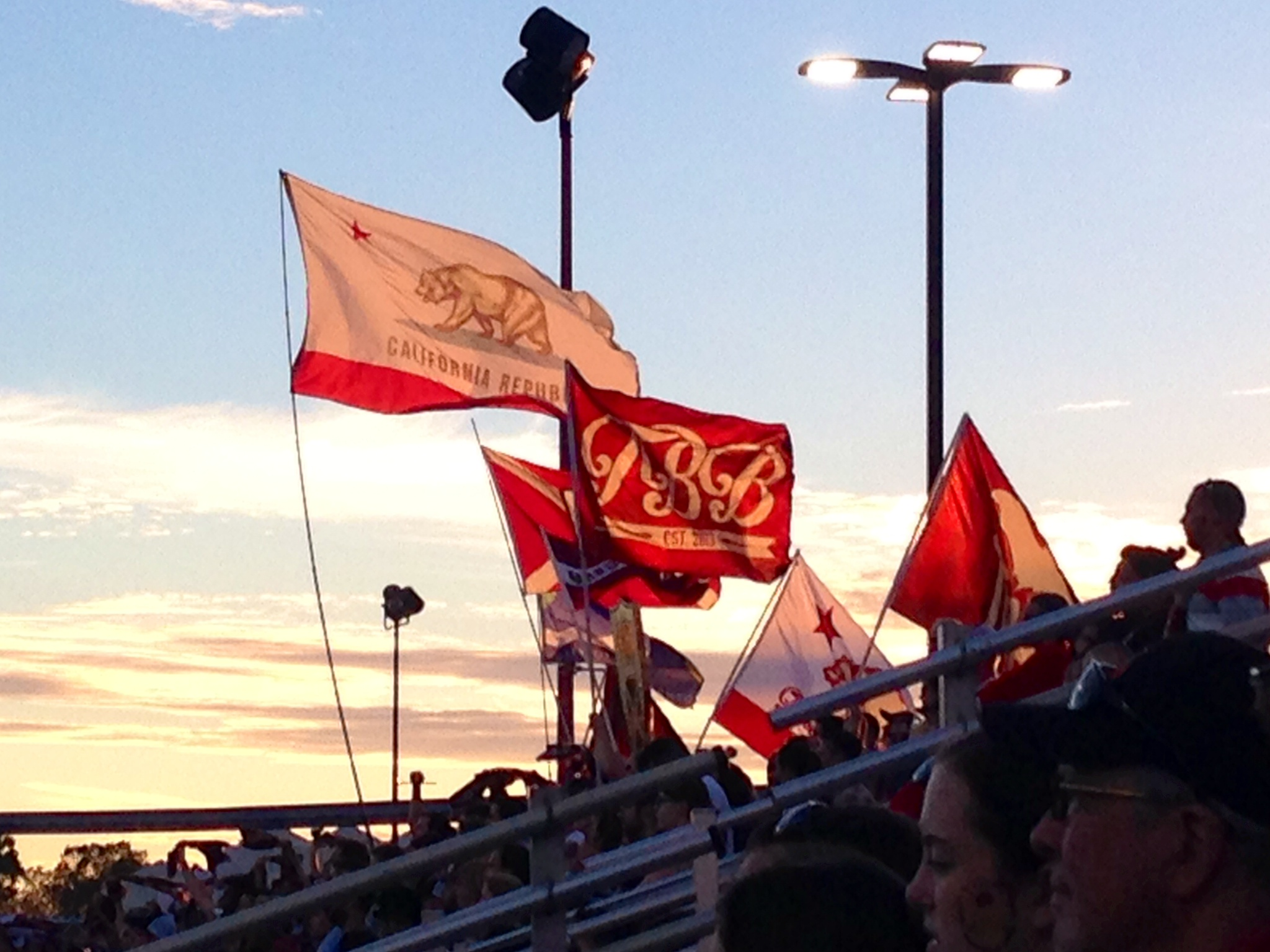
Tower Bridge Battalion, Sacramento Republic supporters

The club's independent supporters' group is called the Tower Bridge Battalion. The group gets their name from the Tower Bridge, a central structure in downtown Sacramento that connects Sacramento proper to West Sacramento. The Tower Bridge Battalion occupies one area of the team's home stadium. Several chants have been coordinated for the Tower Bridge Battalion, which they yell throughout the match. Common instruments used by the Battalion are large drums, megaphones, and other noise-making items. The group has several coordinators that help to keep the crowd in unison during the match.

The Tower Bridge Battalion have been central in organizing fan support of a Major League Soccer expansion team in Sacramento. On September 19, 2014, the Battalion led a crowd of thousands through the streets in downtown Sacramento designed to showcase the area's fanbase for MLS officials.

== Stadium ==
=== Heart Health Park ===
When the club was originally proposed, officials had planned on using Hughes Stadium, a 20,311 seater, open, multi-purpose stadium at Sacramento City College. On November 14, 2013, however, it was announced that Republic FC planned to play in a new 8,000 seat soccer-specific stadium being built on the grounds of Cal Expo. The proposed stadium would be funded and owned by Ovations Food Service and, if approved, was expected to be completed in time for the first match of the 2014 USL season. Because the new stadium at Cal Expo was not completed in time for the start of 2014 season matches, the club played its initial 2014 matches at Hughes Stadium. The new stadium was named Bonney Field, following a sponsorship deal for naming rights with Bonney Plumbing, Heating, Air and Rooter Service.

On June 20, 2014, the club played its inaugural match at the completed Bonney Field against the Colorado Rapids Reserves, winning the match 4–3. The game drew a sellout crowd of 8,000, significantly lower than the regular crowds at Hughes Stadium due to the smaller size of Bonney, but this number still remains very high for regular-season USL Pro matches.

In January 2015, expansion efforts at Bonney Field began to increase the seating at the stadium. Capacity for 2015 was expanded to 11,442, with added seats in the north endline and east sideline. In March 2017, Papa Murphy's Holdings, Inc. acquired the naming rights to the stadium, and Bonney Field was renamed Papa Murphy's Park. On May 5, 2021, the Sacramento Republic FC and Western Health Advantage agreed to a new naming rights deal that would change the name of the stadium to Heart Health Park.

=== Republic FC Stadium ===
As part of team owners' efforts for the club to join MLS as an expansion team, Republic FC has announced intentions to build a 20,000 seat soccer-specific stadium in Downtown Sacramento. In August 2015, Republic FC announced the hiring of HNTB Corp as lead architects of the stadium project, which will be on the former site of the Sacramento Railyards. (HNTB previously designed two Northern California venues, Sutter Health Park in Sacramento and Levi's Stadium in Santa Clara.)

The concept design of the new stadium, based in part on fan input from a web survey and a series of workshops, was unveiled on December 1, 2015. Though designed with a closed bowl, the stadium will have separate stands on different sides to create a unique character for each one, an homage to classic English stadia like St James' Park. To meet the designer's stated goal of creating MLS's best home field advantage, the seating will feature the steepest grade in the MLS in and an untiered east side reminiscent of Westfalenstadion's Yellow Wall. On December 1, the evening of the design unveil, the Sacramento City Council voted 8–0 to approve a term sheet promoting construction of the 25,000-seat venue, with a target 2018 completion date if the club is accepted into MLS. The stadium is estimated to cost $226 million, and will be privately financed.

On April 2, 2019, Sacramento Republic FC released updated renderings of the proposed stadium. Additions to the previous design included a 360-degree concourse/pedestrian walkway, new seating at the canopy level on the west side of the stadium, and additional field-level seating areas, raising the cost to about $252 million. The team stated that if their MLS bid is accepted, they would likely begin construction on the stadium immediately, hoping to complete it by late 2021 or early 2022, in time for the 2022 MLS season. With the team being accepted into MLS on October 21, 2019, they were expected to complete construction for the 2023 season. The plans to build the stadium and join the league are on indefinite hiatus as of February 2021.

On November 7, 2024, Sacramento Republic FC and the mayor of Sacramento Darrell Steinberg announced plans for construction of a 12,000 seater stadium and entertainment district in Sacramento Railyards. The tentative opening of the new stadium is in 2028.

== Players and technical staff ==
=== First-team roster ===
As of August 15, 2026

Note: Flags indicate national team as defined under FIFA eligibility rules; some limited exceptions apply. Players may hold more than one non-FIFA nationality.

No.	Pos.	Nation	Player
1	GK	USA	Danny Vitiello
2	DF	ENG	Jack Gurr
3	DF	USA	Ryan Spaulding
4	DF	IRL	Lee Desmond
5	DF	USA	Jared Timmer
6	DF	USA	Freddy Kleemann
7	FW	MAW	Mayele Malango
8	MF	USA	Memo Rodríguez
10	MF	MEX	Arturo Rodriguez
11	FW	GHA	Forster Ajago
15	MF	GHA	Aaron Essel (on loan from St Johnstone)
16	FW	USA	Tyler Wolff (on loan from Real Salt Lake)
17	FW	GER	Dominik Wanner
18	MF	CAN	Mark-Anthony Kaye

No.	Pos.	Nation	Player
19	FW	HON	Alfredo Midence
22	DF	MEX	Michelle Benítez
23	DF	USA	AJ Edwards
24	MF	ESP	Pep Casas
26	FW	USA	Cal Jennings
27	MF	USA	Danny Crisostomo
31	GK	USA	Jacob Randolph
41	DF	USA	Luke Strassburg
42	DF	USA	Rohan Chivukula
44	GK	USA	Brooks Doolittle
45	DF	USA	Jackson Montero
46	DF	USA	Reid Paskey
55	DF	USA	Chibuike Ukaegbu
71	FW	VIN	Kyle Edwards

Note: Flags indicate national team as defined under FIFA eligibility rules; some limited exceptions apply. Players may hold more than one non-FIFA nationality.

No.	Pos.	Nation	Player
14	MF	USA	Da'vian Kimbrough (on loan to North Texas SC)

=== Technical staff ===
As of February 23, 2026

Position	Name
President & General manager	(United States) Tim Holt
Head coach	(Scotland) Neill Collins
Assistant coach	(United States) Martín Vásquez
Goalkeeping coach	(United States) Bradley Johnson

== Team records ==
=== Year-by-year ===
This is a partial list of the last five seasons completed by Republic. For the full season-by-season history, see List of Sacramento Republic FC seasons.

Season	League											Position		Playoffs	USOC	Continental	Average attendance ^{1}	Top goalscorer(s) ^{2}	
Season	Div	League	Pld	W	L	D	GF	GA	GD	Pts	PPG	Conf.	Overall	Playoffs	USOC	Continental	Average attendance ^{1}	Name	Goals
2022	2	USLC	34	15	11	8	48	34	+14	53	1.56	4th	10th	QF	RU	DNQ	9,876	(Jamaica) Maalique Foster (Mexico) Rodrigo López	8
2023	2	USLC	34	18	6	10	51	26	+25	64	1.88	1st	2nd	SF	R5	DNQ	10,627	(United States) Russell Cicerone	17
2024	2	USLC	34	13	11	10	46	34	+12	49	1.44	5th	11th	R1	QF	DNQ	10,106	(England) Kieran Phillips	13
2025	2	USLC	30	13	9	8	44	27	+17	48	1.60	2nd	4th	R1	Ro32	DNQ	9,829	(United States) Russell Cicerone	8
2026	2	USLC	30	13	5	12	42	28	+14	51	1.70	2nd	4th	Champions	Ro32	DNQ	10,132	(Saint Vincent and the Grenadines) Kyle Edwards	11

1. Avg. attendance include statistics from league matches only.
2. Top goalscorer(s) includes all goals scored in league, league playoffs, U.S. Open Cup, CONCACAF Champions League, FIFA Club World Cup, and other competitive continental matches.

=== Head coaches ===
As of February 14, 2026

- Includes USL Regular season, USL Play-offs and U.S. Lamar Hunt Open Cup

Sacramento Republic FC Coaching Stats
Coach	Nationality	Start	End	Games	Win	Loss	Draw	Win %
Preki	United States	July 15, 2013	July 11, 2015	54	32	15	7	59.26
Paul Buckle	England	July 12, 2015	February 1, 2018	78	34	23	21	43.59
Simon Elliott	New Zealand	February 1, 2018	November 5, 2019	79	40	25	14	50.63
Mark Briggs	England	December 16, 2019	November 4, 2024	169	74	47	48	43.79
Neill Collins	Scotland	December 21, 2024	Present	40	19	9	12	47.50

=== Club captains ===
Dates	Player	Nationality
2014–2015	Justin Braun	United States
2016–2017	Danny Barrera	Colombia
2018	Jeremy Hall	Puerto Rico
2019	Cameron Iwasa	United States
2020	Drew Skundrich	United States
2020	Rodrigo López	Mexico
2021	Petteri Pennanen	Finland
2022	Rodrigo López	Mexico
2022	Lee Desmond	Ireland
2023	Rodrigo López	Mexico

== Honors ==
=== League ===
- USL Championship
  - Champions (2): 2014, 2026
- USL Championship Western Conference (Playoffs)
  - Champions (1): 2026
- USL Championship Western Conference (Regular Season)
  - Champions (2): 2016, 2023
- USL Playoffs
  - Appearances (11): 2014, 2015, 2016, 2017, 2018, 2019, 2020, 2022, 2023, 2024, 2025, 2026

=== Domestic Cup ===
- U.S. Open Cup
  - Runners-up (1): 2022
- USL Cup
  - Runners-up (1): 2025
