= Ammo Baba Stadium =

Stadium in Iraq

- ملعب عمو بابا الدولي
- Interactive map of Ammo Baba Stadium
- Location: Baghdad, Iraq
- Coordinates: 33°28′17.2″N 44°22′24.7″E
- Owner: Ministry of Youth and Sports
- Capacity: 31,200
- Field size: 105 m × 68 m (344 ft × 223 ft)

Construction
- Groundbreaking: 30 December 2012
- Cost: $ 100 million USD
- Architect: Javier Garcia Alda
- Main contractor: TriArena

Ammo Baba Stadium (Arabic: ملعب عمو بابا, romanized: Malʿab ʿemw bābā), previously known as Al Rusafa Stadium, is a football stadium that is currently under construction in Baghdad, Iraq. It will have a capacity of 31,200 spectators and will cost approximately 100 million USD funded entirely by the Iraqi government. By 2022, the stadium was at 62% completion.

In early 2017, the stadium was renamed after Ammo Baba, a famous Iraqi player and manager of the 20th century.

== Design ==
The project involves the construction of a stadium covering an area of 41,500 m² and a built-up area of 17,000 m² with 31,200 seats for the main stadium, including two training pitches with a capacity of 2,000 spectators and 500 spectators respectively. Other related facilities are planned, including a 4-star hotel and 2,900 parking places.

== See also ==
- List of football stadiums in Iraq
