= Shymkent Stadium =

Under construction football stadium in Shymkent, Kazakhstan

- Full name: Shymkent Stadium
- Location: Kazakhstan
- Owner: Municipality of Shymkent
- Capacity: 35,000

Construction
- Groundbreaking: 23 October 2023
- Built: June 2024
- Opened: 2026 (planned)

Shymkent Stadium is a football stadium under construction on Shymkent in Kazakhstan that will become the home ground for Ordabasy ahead of the 2026 season, replacing Kazhymukan Munaitpasov Stadium.

Shumkent Stadium is a former commercial dock and it is intended that the new stadium will become the heart of a new mixed-use development in the area containing shops, housing, gym and other venues. Once the stadium is open, it will become the 1st largest in Kazakhstan.

== See also ==
- List of football stadiums in Kazakhstan
