= Ministry of Youth and Sports (Iraq) =

Iraqi government ministry

Minister of Youth and Sports
- Incumbent; Safaa al-Kinani since 15 October 2026
- Ministry of Youth and Sports
- Member of: Cabinet of Iraq
- Reports to: Parliament of Iraq
- Website: www.moys.gov.iq

The Ministry of Youth and Sports (Arabic: وزارة الشباب والرياضة العراقية) is a central government ministry of Iraq tasked with managing the youth affairs and sports.
