= 2026 Saudi Arabian Grand Prix =

Cancelled Formula One motor race

- Layout of the Jeddah Corniche Circuit

Race details
- Date: Originally planned for 19 April 2026
- Official name: Formula 1 STC Saudi Arabian Grand Prix 2026
- Location: Jeddah Corniche Circuit; Jeddah, Saudi Arabia
- Course: Street circuit
- Course length: 6.174 km (3.836 mi)
- Scheduled distance: 50 laps, 308.450 km (191.662 mi)

The 2026 Saudi Arabian Grand Prix (officially known as the Formula 1 STC Saudi Arabian Grand Prix 2026) was a scheduled Formula One motor race that was due to be held on 19 April 2026 at the Jeddah Corniche Circuit in Jeddah, Saudi Arabia. It was scheduled to be the fifth round of the 2026 Formula One World Championship.

On 14 March 2026, Formula One announced that the race would not take place following the outbreak of the 2026 Iran war, citing safety concerns. The 2026 Bahrain Grand Prix, which had been called off at the same time, was subsequently reinstated and relocated to the Sepang International Circuit in Malaysia, while the Saudi Arabian Grand Prix remained cancelled.

== Background ==
The Grand Prix was scheduled to take place across the weekend of 17–19 April 2026 at the Jeddah Corniche Circuit, for the sixth time in the circuit's history. It would have been the fifth round of the 2026 Formula One World Championship.

=== Championship standings before the Saudi Arabian Grand Prix ===
Mercedes' Kimi Antonelli would have entered the Saudi Arabian Grand Prix as the leader of the Drivers' Championship, having won the previous race in Suzuka. Holding 72 points, Antonelli led his teammate George Russell by nine points, and third-placed Charles Leclerc (Ferrari) by a further fourteen. Mercedes would have entered the round as the leader of the Constructors' Championship. Holding 135 points, they led Ferrari by 45 points, and third-placed McLaren by a further 45 points. As neither the Saudi Arabian Grand Prix, or the rescheduled Bahrain Grand Prix took place on its originally scheduled April date, these standings carried over to the Miami Grand Prix.

== Cancellation ==
On 28 February 2026, the United States and Israel started a war against Iran with airstrikes. In retaliation, Iran launched counterattacks targeting several American military bases across the Middle East, including those in Bahrain, Saudi Arabia, Qatar and the United Arab Emirates, all of which host Formula One Grands Prix.

Following the outbreak of the war, the Fédération Internationale de l'Automobile (FIA) monitored the unfolding situation, prioritising the safety of drivers, team members and other personnel. Several alternatives were considered, but no substitute races could be organised at short notice because the Bahrain and Saudi Arabian Grands Prix had been scheduled early in the season, immediately after the Japanese Grand Prix.

On 14 March, Formula One Management (FOM) and the FIA announced that the Bahrain and Saudi Arabian Grands Prix would not take place in April, citing the ongoing security situation in the Middle East. The associated Formula 2, Formula 3 and F1 Academy rounds were also called off, with replacement rounds later arranged at other venues.

=== Developments during the break ===
Prior to the break, the drivers expressed their concerns about the power unit regulations, particularly when the batteries were undergoing "super clipping", a phenomenon that occurs when the battery is being charged on full throttle against the engine, following a heavy crash at the previous Grand Prix. The FIA, FOM and power unit manufacturers used this subsequent month-long break to hold meetings to discuss where certain regulation changes could be implemented, eventually coming to an agreement that would see these changes debut at the following Miami Grand Prix. As a result, the first practice session for the Miami Grand Prix was extended. Further tweaks were ratified for the 2027 season that would reduce the risk of "super clipping" and the need to lift-and-coast on long straights.

=== Attempts to reschedule ===
Ahead of the British Grand Prix, Formula One chief Stefano Domenicali expressed hope that either the Bahrain Grand Prix or the Saudi Arabian Grand Prix could be restored to the calendar, although Bahrain was considered the more likely option. By late July, reports concerning the restoration of one of the two races had focused on the Bahrain Grand Prix, while the Sepang International Circuit in Malaysia was being considered as an alternative venue. By late-July, the Bahrain Grand Prix was reinstated, taking place at Sepang, though the Saudi Arabian Grand Prix remained cancelled.

=== Uncertainties for Qatar and Abu Dhabi ===
As hostilities continued into June 2026, Formula One developed contingency plans in case the Qatar and Abu Dhabi Grands Prix, scheduled as the two final races of the season, could not take place. One of the suggested venues was the return of the Portuguese Grand Prix at Algarve International Circuit – last hosted in 2021 – ahead of its formal return to Formula One in 2027. In addition to Portimão, Imola – which last hosted the Emilia Romagna Grand Prix in 2025 – appeared as a contender to host the final race of the 2026 season. Domenicali stated that the deadline for the Qatar and Abu Dhabi contingency plan was mid-September.

However, by mid-September, decisions had not been made. During the Italian Grand Prix weekend, the hosts for the Qatar and Abu Dhabi Grands Prix pushed back against drafting contracts with replacement venues. Later the same month, Formula One released its 2027 calendar, with the Bahrain and Saudi Arabian Grands Prix returning to their season-opening positions, as it had prior to 2025; (Note: The Bahrain and Saudi Arabian Grands Prix were moved to the slot following the Australian Grand Prix to accommodate Ramadan, which fell at the same time as those two Grands Prix in 2025 and 2026. Additionally, the Albert Park Circuit would be undergoing renovations to its facilities, ruling it out for a season starter race.) the former was also confirmed to be a sprint format. The announcement came shortly after further renewed hostilities occurred across the Middle East, jeopardising the feasibility of these races running on their intended dates.

Contingency plans were still being drafted after the first deadline had passed, despite Domenicali's statements that decisions would be taken by then. Monetary concerns were also raised; should the organisers cancel the race, they would have to pay FOM a hefty "sanctioning fee" unless the event was cancelled by FOM themselves. By late-September, FOM gave the Imola organisers the greenlight to prepare the circuit for a potential season finale at Imola that follows the Las Vegas Grand Prix should Qatar and Abu Dhabi not go through; FOM paying the track directly ensured that Imola would not be at risk of having to pay the sanctioning fee. Several Formula One team personnel stated mid-October as a new deadline for the contingency plan. This was moved to 10 November.

==== Final decisions ====
On 10 November, FOM stated that Imola's services would not be required, so the forthcoming Qatar and Abu Dhabi Grands Prix would go ahead as scheduled. However, FOM would prioritise safety should conflicts escalate.

== See also ==
- 2011 Bahrain Grand Prix, which was postponed and later cancelled due to civil unrest
- 2020 Australian Grand Prix, which was cancelled due to the outbreak of the COVID-19 pandemic
- 2022 Saudi Arabian Grand Prix, which was held after a nearby oil depot was attacked by drones and missiles attributed to the Houthi movement (a similar incident occurred following the 2021 Diriyah ePrix)
- 2022 Russian Grand Prix, which was suspended and subsequently cancelled following the Russian invasion of Ukraine
- 2023 Emilia-Romagna Grand Prix, which was cancelled due to sudden floods in the region

== Notes ==
| Previous race: N/A | FIA Formula One World Championship; 2026 season | Next race: N/A |
| Previous race: 2025 Saudi Arabian Grand Prix | Saudi Arabian Grand Prix | Next race: 2027 Saudi Arabian Grand Prix |
