= 2022 Saudi Arabian Grand Prix =

Second round of the 2022 Formula One season

Race 2 of 22 (Note: At the time of the event Formula One planned to hold twenty-three Grands Prix.) in the 2022 Formula One World Championship
| ← Previous race | Next race → |
- The circuit layout

Race details
- Date: 27 March 2022
- Official name: Formula 1 STC Saudi Arabian Grand Prix 2022
- Location: Jeddah Corniche Circuit, Jeddah, Saudi Arabia
- Course: Street circuit
- Course length: 6.174 km (3.836 miles)
- Distance: 50 laps, 308.450 km (191.662 miles)
- Weather: Clear
- Attendance: 142,000

Pole position
| Driver | (Mexico) Sergio Pérez | Red Bull Racing-RBPT |
- Time: 1:28.200

Fastest lap
| Driver | (Monaco) Charles Leclerc | Ferrari |
- Time: 1:31.634 on lap 48

Podium
| First | (Netherlands) Max Verstappen | Red Bull Racing-RBPT |
| Second | (Monaco) Charles Leclerc | Ferrari |
| Third | (Spain) Carlos Sainz Jr. | Ferrari |

The 2022 Saudi Arabian Grand Prix (officially known as the Formula 1 STC Saudi Arabian Grand Prix 2022) was a Formula One motor race that was held on 27 March 2022 at the Jeddah Corniche Circuit in Saudi Arabia. It was the second edition of the Saudi Arabian Grand Prix and the second round of the 2022 Formula One World Championship.

Red Bull's Max Verstappen won the race ahead of Ferrari's Charles Leclerc, who set the fastest lap for an additional point, and Ferrari teammate Carlos Sainz Jr. Red Bull's pole-sitter Sergio Pérez finished fourth.

== Background ==
The race weekend was held on 25–27 March 2022 and was the second race to be held in Saudi Arabia after the first one held in December 2021. The race took place one week after the Bahrain Grand Prix and two weeks before the Australian Grand Prix.

=== Missile strike ===
On 25 March, an Aramco oil depot near Jeddah, approximately 16 km (10 mi) from the circuit, was attacked by drones and missiles, triggering a large fire. Yemen's Houthi movement rebels, who were also accused of launching a missile during the 2021 Diriyah ePrix, allegedly claimed responsibility. Black smoke was seen during the first practice session. The second practice session was delayed by 15 minutes to allow for an emergency meeting between the drivers, team principals and Formula One CEO Stefano Domenicali. Despite the attack, Formula One and the organisers announced that the event would continue as planned.

The Grand Prix Drivers' Association held a further meeting with the drivers at 22:00 local time; all drivers agreed to participate for the remainder of the event after 4 1/2 hours of talks. According to the BBC, drivers were reassured over security and convinced to race after being warned of "the consequences of not racing", which reportedly included potentially being denied exit visas to leave the country in the event of a boycott.

=== Championship standings before the race ===
Charles Leclerc was the Drivers' Championship leader after the previous weekend's first round, the Bahrain Grand Prix, with eight points separating him from his teammate Carlos Sainz Jr. and 11 points from Lewis Hamilton. In the Constructors' Championship, Ferrari led Mercedes by 17 points and Haas by a further 17.

=== Entrants ===
The drivers and teams were the same as the season entry list, with the exception of Aston Martin's Sebastian Vettel, who was replaced by Nico Hülkenberg for a second consecutive race, with the former still recovering from coronavirus.

=== Tyre choices ===
Tyre supplier Pirelli brought the C2, C3, and C4 tyre compounds (designated hard, medium, and soft, respectively) for teams to use at the event.

=== Criticism ===
Hosting country Saudi Arabia was under constant condemnation for sportswashing its human rights through the Formula One Grand Prix. The event took place just days after the 2022 Saudi Arabia mass execution, in which 81 men were executed in a single day. Amnesty International said the race "must not be allowed to cover up" Saudi Arabia's human rights violations. Maya Foa, the director of Reprieve, said that the Formula One contract with Saudi Arabia was "to sportswash Mohammed bin Salman's blood-soaked regime".

Lewis Hamilton called on the Saudi authorities "to make the changes" and said there is a "need to see more", while stating that the drivers should not be held accountable for the host country's human rights issues.

== Practice ==
Three practice sessions were held, each lasting one hour. The first two practice sessions were held on Friday 25 March at 17:00 and 20:00 AST (UTC+03:00). The third practice session took place at 17:00 on 26 March. Ferrari's Charles Leclerc topped all three sessions ahead of Red Bull's Max Verstappen; both he and teammate Carlos Sainz Jr. were forced to end their second practice early after each hitting the wall.

== Qualifying ==
Qualifying took place on 26 March at 20:00 AST (UTC+03:00) and lasted for one hour. Mercedes' Lewis Hamilton was eliminated in the first segment of qualifying for the first time since the 2017 Brazilian Grand Prix and the first time he had been eliminated at this stage of qualifying due to lack of pace since qualifying for the 2009 British Grand Prix. Q1 was red flagged for a crash by Williams' Nicholas Latifi; after the suspension, the first five drivers eliminated were AlphaTauri's Yuki Tsunoda, both Williams drivers Latifi and Alexander Albon, Aston Martin's Nico Hülkenberg, and Hamilton. Q2 was red flagged following a crash by Haas's Mick Schumacher, from which he was largely unhurt; he was sent to hospital for precautionary medical scans. After a lengthy suspension, the session was resumed, with Aston Martin's Lance Stroll, Schumacher, Alfa Romeo's Zhou Guanyu, and both McLaren drivers Daniel Ricciardo and Lando Norris all eliminated at the end. Ricciardo, who qualified 12th, was given a three-place grid penalty for impeding Alpine's Esteban Ocon.

During the final part of qualifying, Red Bull's Sergio Pérez took his maiden Formula One pole position ahead of Charles Leclerc and Carlos Sainz Jr. for Ferrari in second and third, respectively. As a result of his pole position, Pérez proceeded to set a new record for most Grands Prix contested before achieving a pole position with 215. Pérez's Red Bull teammate Max Verstappen qualified fourth ahead of Ocon in fifth and George Russell in sixth place. While Schumacher was subsequently medically cleared to race, Haas opted to run just one car (with Kevin Magnussen driving) because repairing Schumacher's heavily damaged car would have compromised his ability to compete normally at the Australian Grand Prix due to a limited supply of spare parts during the three fly-away races at the start of the season.

=== Qualifying classification ===
| Pos. | No. | Driver | Constructor | Qualifying times | | | Final grid |
| Pos. | No. | Driver | Constructor | Q1 | Q2 | Q3 | Final grid |
|---|---|---|---|---|---|---|---|
| 1 | 11 | (Mexico) Sergio Pérez | Red Bull Racing-RBPT | 1:29.705 | 1:28.924 | 1:28.200 | 1 |
| 2 | 16 | (Monaco) Charles Leclerc | Ferrari | 1:29.039 | 1:28.780 | 1:28.225 | 2 |
| 3 | 55 | (Spain) Carlos Sainz Jr. | Ferrari | 1:28.855 | 1:28.686 | 1:28.402 | 3 |
| 4 | 1 | (Netherlands) Max Verstappen | Red Bull Racing-RBPT | 1:28.928 | 1:28.945 | 1:28.461 | 4 |
| 5 | 31 | (France) Esteban Ocon | Alpine-Renault | 1:30.093 | 1:29.584 | 1:29.068 | 5 |
| 6 | 63 | (United Kingdom) George Russell | Mercedes | 1:29.680 | 1:29.618 | 1:29.104 | 6 |
| 7 | 14 | (Spain) Fernando Alonso | Alpine-Renault | 1:29.978 | 1:29.295 | 1:29.147 | 7 |
| 8 | 77 | (Finland) Valtteri Bottas | Alfa Romeo-Ferrari | 1:29.683 | 1:29.404 | 1:29.183 | 8 |
| 9 | 10 | (France) Pierre Gasly | AlphaTauri-RBPT | 1:29.891 | 1:29.418 | 1:29.254 | 9 |
| 10 | 20 | (Denmark) Kevin Magnussen | Haas-Ferrari | 1:29.831 | 1:29.546 | 1:29.588 | 10 |
| 11 | 4 | (United Kingdom) Lando Norris | McLaren-Mercedes | 1:29.957 | 1:29.651 | N/A | 11 |
| 12 | 3 | (Australia) Daniel Ricciardo | McLaren-Mercedes | 1:30.009 | 1:29.773 | N/A | 14^{a} |
| 13 | 24 | (China) Zhou Guanyu | Alfa Romeo-Ferrari | 1:29.978 | 1:29.819 | N/A | 12 |
| 14 | 47 | (Germany) Mick Schumacher | Haas-Ferrari | 1:30.167 | 1:29.920 | N/A | —^{b} |
| 15 | 18 | (Canada) Lance Stroll | Aston Martin Aramco-Mercedes | 1:30.256 | 1:31.009 | N/A | 13 |
| 16 | 44 | (United Kingdom) Lewis Hamilton | Mercedes | 1:30.343 | N/A | N/A | 15 |
| 17 | 23 | (Thailand) Alexander Albon | Williams-Mercedes | 1:30.492 | N/A | N/A | 16 |
| 18 | 27 | (Germany) Nico Hülkenberg | Aston Martin Aramco-Mercedes | 1:30.543 | N/A | N/A | 17 |
| 19 | 6 | (Canada) Nicholas Latifi | Williams-Mercedes | 1:31.817 | N/A | N/A | 18 |
107% time: 1:35.074
| — | 22 | (Japan) Yuki Tsunoda | AlphaTauri-RBPT | No time | N/A | N/A | 19^{c} |

Notes

- ^a – Daniel Ricciardo received a three-place grid penalty for impeding Esteban Ocon during Q2.
- ^b – Mick Schumacher qualified 14th, but his car was withdrawn following a crash, and he did not take the start. Drivers who qualified behind him gained a grid position as he officially did not progress beyond qualifying.
- ^c – Yuki Tsunoda failed to set a time during qualifying, but he was permitted to race at the stewards' discretion.

== Race ==
The race was started at 20:00 AST (UTC+03:00) on 27 March and lasted for 50 laps. Yuki Tsunoda's car suffered a power unit issue on the way to the grid, preventing him from starting the race. Pérez initially led from pole position ahead of Leclerc, Verstappen, and Sainz for 14 laps. On lap 15, Nicholas Latifi retired after hitting the wall, which brought out the safety car and occurred just after Pérez made a pitstop; Leclerc and Verstappen were able to make their pit stops under safety car conditions, allowing them to rejoin in front of Pérez, who illegally passed Sainz, who had also pitted and came out ahead of him, and had to give back position when race resumed.

During much of the race, the midfield was close; there was a hard-fought battle between Alpine's Fernando Alonso and Esteban Ocon for quite a few laps where they swapped positions multiple times. The battle ended after Ocon was given orders to hold position. On laps 35 and 36, Alonso, Daniel Ricciardo, and Valtteri Bottas all retired within moments of each other due to unrelated mechanical issues. Leclerc could not keep Verstappen out of DRS after his tyres cooled down when a virtual safety car was called out on lap 37. As the race direction declared the pit lane closed until race resumed, Lewis Hamilton was precluded from a time-advantage pit stop, dropping him from 6th to 12th.

On laps 42–43, Leclerc and Verstappen started a DRS battle, in which at turn 27 neither driver wanted to take the lead and be vulnerable to a DRS attack in the straight to turn 1. Verstappen took a full lap lead by lap 46. On lap 47, there was a collision between Alexander Albon and Lance Stroll, ending Albon's race. Yellow flags on turn 1 after the Albon–Stroll incident precluded Leclerc for a DRS offensive on lap 48, and Verstappen won the race, with Sainz completing the podium. After the race, Kevin Magnussen, Sainz, and Pérez were investigated for failure to slow down after yellow flags; however, no penalties were handed out. It was Verstappen's first win of the season and 21st overall. It was also Hamilton's 180th race start with Mercedes, surpassing Michael Schumacher's record for most started races with a single team.

From the Australian Grand Prix onwards, the FIA would clamp down on the kinds of tactics Verstappen had employed during the safety car restart, where he aggressively accelerated, braked, and drew alongside Leclerc, trying to seek a tactical advantage, following similar incidents at the 2021 Abu Dhabi and 2022 Bahrain Grands Prix, with drivers expected to drive in a consistent manner during race restarts.

=== Race classification ===
| Pos. | No. | Driver | Constructor | Laps | Time/Retired | Grid | Points |
|---|---|---|---|---|---|---|---|
| 1 | 1 | (Netherlands) Max Verstappen | Red Bull Racing-RBPT | 50 | 1:24:19.293 | 4 | 25 |
| 2 | 16 | (Monaco) Charles Leclerc | Ferrari | 50 | +0.549 | 2 | 19^{a} |
| 3 | 55 | (Spain) Carlos Sainz Jr. | Ferrari | 50 | +8.097 | 3 | 15 |
| 4 | 11 | (Mexico) Sergio Pérez | Red Bull Racing-RBPT | 50 | +10.800 | 1 | 12 |
| 5 | 63 | (United Kingdom) George Russell | Mercedes | 50 | +32.732 | 6 | 10 |
| 6 | 31 | (France) Esteban Ocon | Alpine-Renault | 50 | +56.017 | 5 | 8 |
| 7 | 4 | (United Kingdom) Lando Norris | McLaren-Mercedes | 50 | +56.124 | 11 | 6 |
| 8 | 10 | (France) Pierre Gasly | AlphaTauri-RBPT | 50 | +1:02.946 | 9 | 4 |
| 9 | 20 | (Denmark) Kevin Magnussen | Haas-Ferrari | 50 | +1:04.308 | 10 | 2 |
| 10 | 44 | (United Kingdom) Lewis Hamilton | Mercedes | 50 | +1:13.948 | 15 | 1 |
| 11 | 24 | (China) Zhou Guanyu | Alfa Romeo-Ferrari | 50 | +1:22.215 | 12 | |
| 12 | 27 | (Germany) Nico Hülkenberg | Aston Martin Aramco-Mercedes | 50 | +1:31.742 | 17 | |
| 13 | 18 | (Canada) Lance Stroll | Aston Martin Aramco-Mercedes | 49 | +1 lap | 13 | |
| 14^{b} | 23 | (Thailand) Alexander Albon | Williams-Mercedes | 47 | Collision damage | 16 | |
| Ret | 77 | (Finland) Valtteri Bottas | Alfa Romeo-Ferrari | 36 | Cooling system | 8 | |
| Ret | 14 | (Spain) Fernando Alonso | Alpine-Renault | 35 | Water pressure | 7 | |
| Ret | 3 | (Australia) Daniel Ricciardo | McLaren-Mercedes | 35 | Gearbox | 14 | |
| Ret | 6 | (Canada) Nicholas Latifi | Williams-Mercedes | 14 | Accident | 18 | |
| DNS | 22 | (Japan) Yuki Tsunoda | AlphaTauri-RBPT | 0 | Power unit | —^{c} | |
| WD | 47 | (Germany) Mick Schumacher | Haas-Ferrari | 0 | Qualifying accident | —^{d} | |
Fastest lap: (Monaco) Charles Leclerc (Ferrari) – 1:31.634 (lap 48)

Notes

- ^a – Includes one point for fastest lap.
- ^b – Alexander Albon was classified as he completed more than 90% of the race distance.
- ^c – Yuki Tsunoda did not start the race. His place on the grid was left vacant.
- ^d – Mick Schumacher withdrew due to a crash in qualifying. Drivers who qualified behind him gained a grid position.

== Championship standings after the race ==
The result enabled Leclerc to extend his lead in the Drivers' Championship to twelve points over teammate Sainz, while reigning champion Verstappen moved to third with a 20-point-deficit to Leclerc following his first win of the season. Meanwhile, Ferrari extended their lead in the Constructors' Championship to 40 points over defending eight-time champions Mercedes, whilst Red Bull climbed up to third, trailing Mercedes by just a single point following a difficult weekend for Hamilton.

Drivers' Championship standings

| | Pos. | Driver | Points |
|---|---|---|---|
| | 1 | (Monaco) Charles Leclerc | 45 |
| | 2 | (Spain) Carlos Sainz Jr. | 33 |
| 16 | 3 | (Netherlands) Max Verstappen | 25 |
| | 4 | (United Kingdom) George Russell | 22 |
| 2 | 5 | (United Kingdom) Lewis Hamilton | 16 |

Constructors' Championship standings

| | Pos. | Constructor | Points |
|---|---|---|---|
| | 1 | (Italy) Ferrari | 78 |
| | 2 | (Germany) Mercedes | 38 |
| 7 | 3 | (Austria) Red Bull Racing-RBPT | 37 |
| 1 | 4 | (France) Alpine-Renault | 16 |
| 2 | 5 | (United States) Haas-Ferrari | 12 |

- Note: Only the top five positions are included for both sets of standings.

== See also ==
- 2022 Jeddah Formula 2 round

== Notes ==
| Previous race: 2022 Bahrain Grand Prix | FIA Formula One World Championship; 2022 season | Next race: 2022 Australian Grand Prix |
| Previous race: 2021 Saudi Arabian Grand Prix | Saudi Arabian Grand Prix | Next race: 2023 Saudi Arabian Grand Prix |
