= 2025 Saudi Arabian Grand Prix =

Fifth round of the 2025 F1 season

Race 5 of 24 in the 2025 Formula One World Championship
← Previous race	Next race →
- Layout of the Jeddah Corniche Circuit

Race details
- Date: 20 April 2025
- Official name: Formula 1 STC Saudi Arabian Grand Prix 2025
- Location: Jeddah Corniche Circuit; Jeddah, Saudi Arabia
- Course: Street circuit
- Course length: 6.174 km (3.836 miles)
- Distance: 50 laps, 308.450 km (191.662 miles)
- Weather: Clear

Pole position
Driver	(Netherlands) Max Verstappen	Red Bull Racing-Honda RBPT
- Time: 1:27.294

Fastest lap
Driver	(United Kingdom) Lando Norris	McLaren-Mercedes
- Time: 1:31.778 on lap 41

Podium
First	(Australia) Oscar Piastri	McLaren-Mercedes
Second	(Netherlands) Max Verstappen	Red Bull Racing-Honda RBPT
Third	(Monaco) Charles Leclerc	Ferrari

The 2025 Saudi Arabian Grand Prix (officially known as the Formula 1 STC Saudi Arabian Grand Prix 2025) was a Formula One motor race held on 20 April 2025 at the Jeddah Corniche Circuit in Jeddah, Saudi Arabia. It was the fifth round of the 2025 Formula One World Championship.

Max Verstappen of Red Bull Racing took pole position for the event, his second of the season, but lost out to Oscar Piastri of McLaren in the race, who capitalised on a mistake made by teammate Lando Norris in qualifying to take his third win of the season. The podium was completed by Verstappen and Charles Leclerc, the latter taking Ferrari's first podium of the season.

== Background ==
The event was held at the Jeddah Corniche Circuit in Jeddah for the fifth time in the circuit's history, across the weekend of 18–20 April. The Grand Prix was the fifth round of the 2025 Formula One World Championship, and the fifth running of the Saudi Arabian Grand Prix.

=== Championship standings before the race ===
Going into the event, Lando Norris led the Drivers' Championship with 77 points, three points ahead of his teammate Oscar Piastri in second, and eight ahead of Max Verstappen in third. McLaren, with 151 points, entered the race as the leader in the Constructors' Championship from Mercedes in second with 93 points, and as third in Red Bull Racing with 71 points.

=== Entrants ===
The drivers and teams were the same as published in the season entry list with one exception. Yuki Tsunoda at Red Bull Racing was in the seat originally held by Liam Lawson before the latter was demoted back to Racing Bulls from the Japanese Grand Prix onward.

=== Tyre choices ===
Tyre supplier Pirelli brought the C3, C4, and C5 tyre compounds, designated hard, medium, and soft, respectively, for teams to use at the event.

== Practice ==
Three free practice sessions were held for the event. The first free practice session was held on 18 April 2025, at 16:30 local time (UTC+3), and was topped by Pierre Gasly of Alpine followed by Lando Norris of McLaren and Charles Leclerc of Ferrari. The second free practice session was held on the same day, at 20:00 local time, and was topped by Norris ahead of his teammate Oscar Piastri and Max Verstappen of Red Bull Racing. The session was red-flagged in the closing stages due to Yuki Tsunoda of Red Bull Racing crashing at turn 27. The third free practice session was held on 19 April 2025, at 16:30 local time, and was topped by Norris ahead of his teammate Piastri and George Russell of Mercedes.

== Qualifying ==
Qualifying was held on 19 April 2025, at 20:00 local time (UTC+3), and determined the starting grid order for the race.

=== Qualifying report ===
Max Verstappen of Red Bull Racing took his second pole position of the season, breaking the lap record in the process, ahead of Oscar Piastri of McLaren and George Russell of Mercedes. Championship leader and Piastri's teammate Lando Norris crashed out around turns 4, 5 and 6, leaving him unable to set a time in Q3 and thus qualifying in tenth position.

=== Qualifying classification ===
Pos.	No.	Driver	Constructor	Qualifying times			Final grid
Pos.	No.	Driver	Constructor	Q1	Q2	Q3	Final grid
1	1	(Netherlands) Max Verstappen	Red Bull Racing-Honda RBPT	1:27.778	1:27.529	1:27.294	1
2	81	(Australia) Oscar Piastri	McLaren-Mercedes	1:27.901	1:27.545	1:27.304	2
3	63	(United Kingdom) George Russell	Mercedes	1:28.282	1:27.599	1:27.407	3
4	16	(Monaco) Charles Leclerc	Ferrari	1:28.552	1:27.866	1:27.670	4
5	12	(Italy) Kimi Antonelli	Mercedes	1:28.128	1:27.798	1:27.866	5
6	55	(Spain) Carlos Sainz Jr.	Williams-Mercedes	1:28.354	1:28.024	1:28.164	6
7	44	(United Kingdom) Lewis Hamilton	Ferrari	1:28.372	1:28.102	1:28.201	7
8	22	(Japan) Yuki Tsunoda	Red Bull Racing-Honda RBPT	1:28.226	1:27.990	1:28.204	8
9	10	(France) Pierre Gasly	Alpine-Renault	1:28.421	1:28.025	1:28.367	9
10	4	(United Kingdom) Lando Norris	McLaren-Mercedes	1:27.805	1:27.481	No time	10
11	23	(Thailand) Alexander Albon	Williams-Mercedes	1:28.279	1:28.109	N/A	11
12	30	(New Zealand) Liam Lawson	Racing Bulls-Honda RBPT	1:28.561	1:28.191	N/A	12
13	14	(Spain) Fernando Alonso	Aston Martin Aramco-Mercedes	1:28.548	1:28.303	N/A	13
14	6	(France) Isack Hadjar	Racing Bulls-Honda RBPT	1:28.571	1:28.418	N/A	14
15	87	(United Kingdom) Oliver Bearman	Haas-Ferrari	1:28.536	1:28.648	N/A	15
16	18	(Canada) Lance Stroll	Aston Martin Aramco-Mercedes	1:28.645	N/A	N/A	16
17	7	(Australia) Jack Doohan	Alpine-Renault	1:28.739	N/A	N/A	17
18	27	(Germany) Nico Hülkenberg	Kick Sauber-Ferrari	1:28.782	N/A	N/A	18
19	31	(France) Esteban Ocon	Haas-Ferrari	1:29.092	N/A	N/A	19
20	5	(Brazil) Gabriel Bortoleto	Kick Sauber-Ferrari	1:29.462	N/A	N/A	20
107% time: 1:33.922

== Race ==
The race was held on 20 April 2025, at 20:00 local time (UTC+3), and was run for 50 laps.

=== Race report ===
Polesitter Max Verstappen of Red Bull did not get as strong a start as 2nd-placed Oscar Piastri of McLaren, allowing Piastri to take the inside line for the tight turn 1 left-hander. Verstappen attempted to hold the position around the outside, but went off the track and cut across turn 2, rejoining still ahead of Piastri. Kimi Antonelli of Mercedes, who had started 5th, was forced to take similar off-track action whilst attempting to overtake Charles Leclerc of Ferrari, but unlike Verstappen immediately returned the position to Leclerc. Piastri quickly took to team radio to demand Verstappen cede the lead, stating that "I was ahead", whilst Verstappen claimed he had been forced off. The stewards gave Verstappen a 5 second time penalty for leaving the track and gaining an advantage. After starting 8th, Verstappen's teammate Yuki Tsunoda attempted to run side by side with Pierre Gasly of Alpine into turn 5, with Gasly on the outside of the corner. The pair made contact, causing both drivers to spin and Gasly to hit the wall heavily, causing terminal damage to his car. Tsunoda was able to return to the pits, but would also retire due to damage from the incident. In order to clear Gasly's stricken car, as well as debris from the incident, the safety car was deployed.

The safety car was withdrawn at the end of lap 3, with Verstappen waiting until the exit of turn 27 to pick up speed as he led the field back to green flag running. Piastri was briefly challenged by third-placed George Russell of Mercedes into turn 1, ultimately holding the position. At the end of lap 4, Isack Hadjar of Racing Bulls passed Fernando Alonso of Aston Martin at turn 27, moving himself up into the top 10. On lap 7, Piastri's teammate Lando Norris passed Carlos Sainz Jr. of Williams at turn 1 to take 7th. Norris, who was on a recovery drive after his crash in qualifying, attempted to pass Leclerc's teammate Lewis Hamilton at turn 27 on lap 12, however Hamilton was able to use DRS to retake the position as the pair started lap 13. At the end of lap 13, Hamilton purposefully let Norris through at turn 27, as this allowed to him to again receive and use DRS to retake the position at turn 1. On lap 15, Norris overtook Hamilton at turn 1, and this time held the position permanently. On lap 19, Norris overtook Antonelli at the same location to move into 5th. Piastri, who was running 3 seconds behind Verstappen, made his sole pitstop at the end of this lap, re-joining in 6th.

On lap 21, Piastri passed Hamilton with an overtake at turn 22, with Verstappen coming into the pits to make his stop moments later. After serving his penalty, Verstappen re-joined the race in 5th, 3 seconds behind Piastri with Hamilton in-between the pair; this was short lived as Hamilton pitted on lap 23. On lap 34 race leader Norris, who had run long due to his decision to start on the hard tyre, became the final leading driver to stop and re-joined in 5th position. Four laps later Leclerc, with the assistance of tyres which were 9 laps younger, passed Russell at turn 1 to take 3rd position. Norris, utilising new medium tyres, followed Leclerc past Russell at the start of lap 41.

With Verstappen remaining around 3 seconds back, Piastri was able to maintain his lead to the finish, seeing the chequered flag first to take this third Grand Prix victory of the season, and the fifth of his career. This was McLaren's first win at the Saudi Arabian Grand Prix, and the first time the race was not won by Red Bull since Mercedes won its inaugural running in 2021. Verstappen finished second, followed by Leclerc, the latter taking his and Ferrari's first Grand Prix podium of the season; this continued Ferrari's streak of scoring at least one podium in every season since 1981. Piastri's win led to him leading the World Driver's Championship for the first time in his career, with him becoming the first Australian to do so since his manager Mark Webber at the 2010 Japanese Grand Prix.

=== Race classification ===
Pos.	No.	Driver	Constructor	Laps	Time/Retired	Grid	Points
1	81	(Australia) Oscar Piastri	McLaren-Mercedes	50	1:21:06.758	2	25
2	1	(Netherlands) Max Verstappen	Red Bull Racing-Honda RBPT	50	+2.843	1	18
3	16	(Monaco) Charles Leclerc	Ferrari	50	+8.104	4	15
4	4	(United Kingdom) Lando Norris	McLaren-Mercedes	50	+9.196	10	12
5	63	(United Kingdom) George Russell	Mercedes	50	+27.236	3	10
6	12	(Italy) Kimi Antonelli	Mercedes	50	+34.688	5	8
7	44	(United Kingdom) Lewis Hamilton	Ferrari	50	+39.073	7	6
8	55	(Spain) Carlos Sainz Jr.	Williams-Mercedes	50	+1:04.630	6	4
9	23	(Thailand) Alexander Albon	Williams-Mercedes	50	+1:06.515	11	2
10	6	(France) Isack Hadjar	Racing Bulls-Honda RBPT	50	+1:07.091	14	1
11	14	(Spain) Fernando Alonso	Aston Martin Aramco-Mercedes	50	+1:15.917	13	
12	30	(New Zealand) Liam Lawson	Racing Bulls-Honda RBPT	50	+1:18.451^{1}	12	
13	87	(United Kingdom) Oliver Bearman	Haas-Ferrari	50	+1:19.194	15	
14	31	(France) Esteban Ocon	Haas-Ferrari	50	+1:39.723	19	
15	27	(Germany) Nico Hülkenberg	Kick Sauber-Ferrari	49	+1 lap	18	
16	18	(Canada) Lance Stroll	Aston Martin Aramco-Mercedes	49	+1 lap	16	
17	7	(Australia) Jack Doohan	Alpine-Renault	49	+1 lap	17	
18	5	(Brazil) Gabriel Bortoleto	Kick Sauber-Ferrari	49	+1 lap	20	
Ret	22	(Japan) Yuki Tsunoda	Red Bull Racing-Honda RBPT	1	Collision damage	8	
Ret	10	(France) Pierre Gasly	Alpine-Renault	0	Collision	9	

Notes

- ^1 – Liam Lawson finished 11th, but received a ten-second time penalty for leaving the track and gaining an advantage.

== Championship standings after the race ==
Drivers' Championship standings

	Pos.	Driver	Points
1	1	(Australia) Oscar Piastri	99
1	2	(United Kingdom) Lando Norris	89
	3	(Netherlands) Max Verstappen	87
	4	(United Kingdom) George Russell	73
	5	(Monaco) Charles Leclerc	47

Constructors' Championship standings

	Pos.	Constructor	Points
	1	(United Kingdom) McLaren-Mercedes	188
	2	(Germany) Mercedes	111
	3	(Austria) Red Bull Racing-Honda RBPT	89
	4	(Italy) Ferrari	78
1	5	(United Kingdom) Williams-Mercedes	25

- Note: Only the top five positions are included for both sets of standings.

== See also ==
- 2025 Jeddah Formula 2 round

Previous race: 2025 Bahrain Grand Prix	FIA Formula One World Championship; 2025 season	Next race: 2025 Miami Grand Prix
Previous race: 2024 Saudi Arabian Grand Prix	Saudi Arabian Grand Prix	Next race: 2027 Saudi Arabian Grand Prix; 2026 edition cancelled
