= Saudi Arabian Grand Prix =

Formula One Grand Prix

- Jeddah Corniche Circuit

Race information
- Number of times held: 5
- First held: 2021
- Last held: 2025
- Most wins (drivers): (Netherlands) Max Verstappen (2)
- Most wins (constructors): (Austria) Red Bull Racing (3)
- Circuit length: 6.174 km (3.836 miles)
- Race length: 308.450 km (191.662 miles)
- Laps: 50

Last race (2025)

Pole position
- (Netherlands) Max Verstappen; Red Bull Racing-Honda RBPT; 1:27.294

Podium
- 1. (Australia) O. Piastri; McLaren-Mercedes; 1:21:06.758; 2. (Netherlands) M. Verstappen; Red Bull Racing-Honda RBPT; +2.843; 3. (Monaco) C. Leclerc; Ferrari; +8.104

Fastest lap
- (United Kingdom) Lando Norris; McLaren-Mercedes; 1:31.778

The Saudi Arabian Grand Prix (Arabic: جائزة السعودية الكبرى) is an annual Formula One motor racing event which took place for the first time in 2021. The inaugural edition of the race was held in Jeddah, in Saudi Arabia, at the Jeddah Corniche Circuit, where it is scheduled to run the event until 2027. This Grand Prix was first scheduled as the penultimate race of the 2021 season, and was moved into an early-season slot since 2022. Formula One describes the Jeddah Corniche Circuit as the fastest street circuit in the sport, featuring 27 corners. A new track in Qiddiya was proposed in 2024 and was under construction as of 2026, with the intention to host the race there for the 2028 season.

It is the fifth full-night race title on the Formula One calendar, following the Singapore, Bahrain, Sakhir and Qatar Grands Prix.

The 2026 Saudi Arabian Grand Prix was cancelled due to the nearby Iran war; it is set to return in 2027.

== History ==
In August 2019, plans for a permanent motorsports complex to be built in Qiddiya City near the Saudi capital of Riyadh were made public. The project was conceived by Test and Training International, a motorsports consultancy headed by former Formula One driver Alexander Wurz, with the objective of creating a world-class circuit capable of hosting all FIA categories through to Formula One. In January 2020, plans for a race track in Qiddiya were officially confirmed at an event, where track designer Wurz appeared alongside current and former Formula One drivers who were given the opportunity to drive on the layout in a racing simulator. During the event, it was confirmed that the track was designed to FIA and FIM Grade 1 standards. At the time, Formula One declined to comment on the possibility of a race.

The Saudi Arabian Grand Prix first appeared on the first draft of the 2021 Formula One provisional calendar, which was shown to teams at a Formula One Commission meeting, held in October 2020. The draft calendar saw all 22 races from the original 2020 calendar carried over, with the addition of Saudi Arabia. In November 2020, it was announced that the city of Jeddah would host the inaugural Saudi Arabian Grand Prix, in collaboration with the Saudi Automobile and Motorcycle Federation, and the Jeddah Corniche Circuit would be located along the shore of the Red Sea.

In October 2022, Saudi Arabia's minister of sport Abdulaziz bin Turki Al Saud expressed interest in having both Jeddah and Qiddiya host annual Formula One races or for the Saudi Arabian Grand Prix to alternate between the two venues, once the Qiddiya track opens.

In January 2023, it was reported that race organisers expected that the Saudi Arabian Grand Prix would be held in Jeddah until 2027 while work on the Qiddiya track continues after which the Jeddah circuit may still be used for a separate Saudi Arabian Formula One race alongside Qiddiya.

On 14 March 2026, due to the conflict between Iran and the United States, both the Bahrain and Saudi Arabian Grand Prix have been cancelled for driver and staff safety. Later developments allowed the Bahrain Grand Prix to move to Sepang International Circuit in Malaysia, with the Saudi Arabia race remaining cancelled. Both Grands Prix are set to return as the season openers of the 2027 season.

== Criticism ==
The Grand Prix has received criticism from Amnesty International on the grounds of human rights in Saudi Arabia, which is a totalitarian state. Human Rights Watch also condemned the decision arguing that "it is part of a cynical strategy to distract from Saudi Arabia's human rights abuses". Formula One responded by saying that "Formula One has made our position on human rights and other issues clear to all our partners and host countries who commit to respect human rights in the way their events are hosted and delivered" and that "Formula One has worked hard to be a positive force everywhere it races, including economic, social and cultural benefits". According to Human Rights Watch, the Grand Prix and other sports events are being used by Saudi Arabia to distract people from serious human rights abuses. The Global Initiative Director at Human Rights Watch, Minky Worden, called upon Formula One to assess situation in Saudi Arabia and insist on releasing women's rights defenders who spoke in favour of women's right to drive. In February 2021, 45 human rights organizations called on Lewis Hamilton to boycott the Grand Prix, citing among other factors Saudi Arabia's role in the Yemeni Civil War and the assassination of The Washington Post journalist Jamal Khashoggi. Saudi Arabia has denied the Grand Prix was being used for sportswashing, arguing that the race forms part of the country's efforts to open itself up to the outside world. The event received criticism from human rights groups. Many accused the Arab nation and its Crown Prince Mohammed bin Salman of "sportswashing" their image. It was claimed that Saudi Arabia was stepping into some of the biggest sport events to cover its human rights violations.

Following the missile interception in Diriyah during the 2021 Diriyah ePrix, questions were raised about the event's viability. Formula One later stated that they would never go to high security risk areas, though they also stated that they had "every confidence that the Saudi government and its agencies have both the technology and capability to ensure this safety and security". During the 2021 race, Lewis Hamilton wore a rainbow-coloured helmet, showing his support for the LGBT community and showed that he wanted the rules on people in the LGBT community to change in Saudi Arabia. He also wore this helmet in the previous and following race.

The 2022 Saudi Arabian Grand Prix was impacted by the Saudi-led intervention in the Yemeni civil war. Yemen’s Houthi rebels carried out a missile attack on an Aramco oil depot (approximately 16 kilometres (10 miles) from the circuit), causing an explosion, during the first of two practice sessions. The incident highlighted risks for the race, with drivers, such as Lewis Hamilton, raising concerns over the event’s safety. After discussions lasting several hours, an agreement was reached to hold the event. Besides the attack, there were serious questions over the years of human rights abuses in Saudi Arabia. The authoritarian regime was criticised for its continued repression of dissidents, particularly in light of the mass execution of 81 people two weeks before the race.

The 2026 Saudi Arabian Grand Prix was cancelled on 14 March 2026 following the breakout of the conflict between Iran and the United States on the grounds of driver and staff safety.

== Circuit ==
Named as the 'fastest street track' on the Formula One calendar, with Formula One cars averaging around 250 km/h (160 mph), the track is currently the third longest on the Formula One calendar behind Circuit de Spa-Francorchamps in Belgium and Las Vegas Strip Circuit in the United States. The circuit is located on the Jeddah Corniche, adjoining the Red Sea. It was designed by Carsten Tilke, son of the famed circuit designer, Hermann Tilke.

In Formula One, the Saudi Arabian Grand Prix race and qualifying are both held during the night, under the lights where the temperatures are substantially cooler than the day. The Formula 2 race is held during the day and two of the three Formula One practice sessions are held during daytime and high track temperatures.

== Winners ==
=== By year ===
All Saudi Arabian Grands Prix were held at the Jeddah Corniche Circuit.

Year	Driver	Constructor	Report
2021	(United Kingdom) Lewis Hamilton	Mercedes	Report
2022	(Netherlands) Max Verstappen	Red Bull Racing-RBPT	Report
2023	(Mexico) Sergio Pérez	Red Bull Racing-Honda RBPT	Report
2024	(Netherlands) Max Verstappen	Red Bull Racing-Honda RBPT	Report
2025	(Australia) Oscar Piastri	McLaren-Mercedes	Report
2026	Cancelled due to the 2026 Iran war		Report

=== Repeat winners (drivers) ===
Drivers in bold are competing in the Formula One championship in 2026.

Wins	Driver	Years won
2	(Netherlands) **Max Verstappen**	2022, 2024

=== Repeat winners (constructors) ===
Teams in bold are competing in the Formula One championship in 2026.

Wins	Constructor	Years won
3	(Austria) **Red Bull Racing**	2022, 2023, 2024

=== Repeat winners (engine manufacturers) ===
Manufacturers in bold are competing in the Formula One championship in 2026.

Wins	Manufacturer	Years won
2	(Germany) **Mercedes**	2021, 2025
2	(Japan) Honda RBPT	2023, 2024
