= 2024 Saudi Arabian Grand Prix =

Second round of the 2024 F1 season

Race 2 of 24 in the 2024 Formula One World Championship
← Previous race	Next race →
- The circuit layout

Race details
- Date: 9 March 2024
- Official name: Formula 1 STC Saudi Arabian Grand Prix 2024
- Location: Jeddah Corniche Circuit; Jeddah, Saudi Arabia
- Course: Street Circuit
- Course length: 6.174 km (3.836 miles)
- Distance: 50 laps, 308.450 km (191.662 miles)
- Weather: Clear

Pole position
Driver	(Netherlands) Max Verstappen	Red Bull Racing-Honda RBPT
- Time: 1:27.472

Fastest lap
Driver	(Monaco) Charles Leclerc	Ferrari
- Time: 1:31.632 on lap 50

Podium
First	(Netherlands) Max Verstappen	Red Bull Racing-Honda RBPT
Second	(Mexico) Sergio Pérez	Red Bull Racing-Honda RBPT
Third	(Monaco) Charles Leclerc	Ferrari

The 2024 Saudi Arabian Grand Prix (officially known as the Formula 1 STC Saudi Arabian Grand Prix 2024) was a Formula One motor race held on 9 March 2024 at the Jeddah Corniche Circuit in Jeddah, Saudi Arabia. The race was the second round of the 2024 Formula One World Championship.

Max Verstappen won the race from pole position, taking his 100th podium, his ninth victory in a row, and his second victory of the season. This race saw the Grand Prix debut of Formula 2 driver Oliver Bearman, who substituted for Carlos Sainz Jr. at Ferrari. Bearman finished in seventh place scoring his first points in Formula One.

== Background ==
The event was held across 7–9 March. It was the second round of the 2024 Formula One World Championship and the fourth running of the Saudi Arabian Grand Prix.

The Grand Prix was scheduled for a Saturday to accommodate Ramadan, which began on 10 March.

=== Championship standings before the race ===
Going into the weekend, Max Verstappen led the Drivers' Championship with 26 points, 8 points from his teammate Sergio Pérez in second, and 11 from Carlos Sainz Jr. in third. Red Bull Racing led the Constructors' Championship over Ferrari by 17 points, and Mercedes by 28 points.

=== Entrants ===
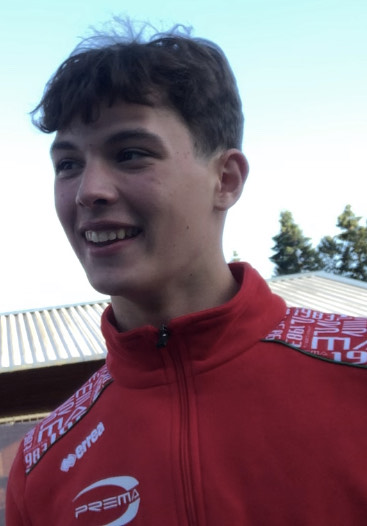
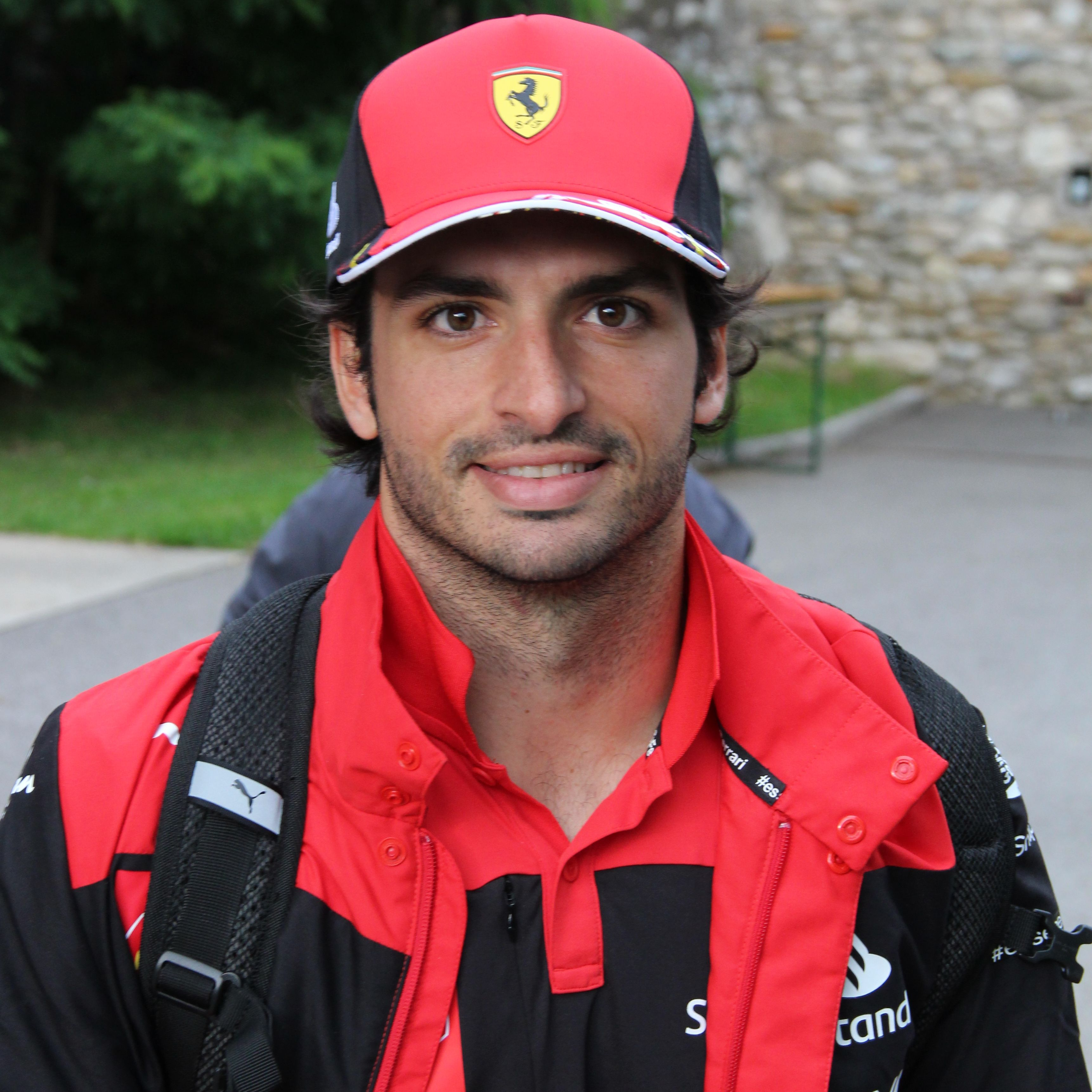
Debutant Oliver Bearman (left) stood in for Carlos Sainz Jr. (right) at Ferrari.

The drivers and teams were initially the same as the season entry list. However, Ferrari reserve and Formula 2 driver Oliver Bearman replaced Carlos Sainz Jr. starting from the third free practice session, after Sainz was diagnosed with appendicitis and withdrew from the event to undergo surgery. Bearman made his Formula One debut.

=== Tyre choices ===
Tyre supplier Pirelli brought the C2, C3, and C4 tyre compounds (the middle three in their range) designated hard, medium, and soft, respectively, for teams to use at the event.

== Practice ==
Three free practice sessions were held for the event. The first free practice session was held on 7 March 2024, at 16:30 local time (UTC+3), and was topped by Max Verstappen of Red Bull Racing ahead of Fernando Alonso of Aston Martin and Verstappen's teammate Sergio Pérez. The second free practice session was held on the same day and was scheduled at 20:00 local time, but was delayed by ten minutes as bolts were checked on drain covers in the pit lane. The session was topped by Alonso ahead of George Russell of Mercedes and Verstappen. The third free practice session was held on 8 March 2024, at 16:30 local time, and was topped by Verstappen ahead of Charles Leclerc of Ferrari and Verstappen's teammate Pérez. The session was red-flagged after Sauber's Zhou Guanyu lost control of his car and crashed into the barriers, but was resumed after necessary repairs to the barriers were carried out.

== Qualifying ==
Qualifying was held on 8 March 2024, at 20:00 local time (UTC+3).

=== Qualifying classification ===
Pos.	No.	Driver	Constructor	Qualifying times			Final grid
Pos.	No.	Driver	Constructor	Q1	Q2	Q3	Final grid
1	1	(Netherlands) Max Verstappen	Red Bull Racing-Honda RBPT	1:28.171	1:28.033	1:27.472	1
2	16	(Monaco) Charles Leclerc	Ferrari	1:28.318	1:28.112	1:27.791	2
3	11	(Mexico) Sergio Pérez	Red Bull Racing-Honda RBPT	1:28.638	1:28.467	1:27.807	3
4	14	(Spain) Fernando Alonso	Aston Martin Aramco-Mercedes	1:28.706	1:28.122	1:27.846	4
5	81	(Australia) Oscar Piastri	McLaren-Mercedes	1:28.755	1:28.343	1:28.089	5
6	4	(United Kingdom) Lando Norris	McLaren-Mercedes	1:28.805	1:28.479	1:28.132	6
7	63	(United Kingdom) George Russell	Mercedes	1:28.749	1:28.448	1:28.316	7
8	44	(United Kingdom) Lewis Hamilton	Mercedes	1:28.994	1:28.606	1:28.460	8
9	22	(Japan) Yuki Tsunoda	RB-Honda RBPT	1:28.988	1:28.564	1:28.547	9
10	18	(Canada) Lance Stroll	Aston Martin Aramco-Mercedes	1:28.250	1:28.578	1:28.572	10
11	38	(United Kingdom) Oliver Bearman	Ferrari	1:28.984	1:28.642	N/A	11
12	23	(Thailand) Alexander Albon	Williams-Mercedes	1:29.107	1:28.980	N/A	12
13	20	(Denmark) Kevin Magnussen	Haas-Ferrari	1:29.069	1:29.020	N/A	13
14	3	(Australia) Daniel Ricciardo	RB-Honda RBPT	1:29.065	1:29.025	N/A	14
15	27	(Germany) Nico Hülkenberg	Haas-Ferrari	1:29.055	No time	N/A	15
16	77	(Finland) Valtteri Bottas	Kick Sauber-Ferrari	1:29.179	N/A	N/A	16
17	31	(France) Esteban Ocon	Alpine-Renault	1:29.475	N/A	N/A	17
18	10	(France) Pierre Gasly	Alpine-Renault	1:29.479	N/A	N/A	18
19	2	(United States) Logan Sargeant	Williams-Mercedes	1:29.526	N/A	N/A	19
107% time: 1:34.342
—	24	(China) Zhou Guanyu	Kick Sauber-Ferrari	No time	N/A	N/A	20^{a}

Notes

- ^a – Zhou Guanyu failed to set a time during qualifying. He was permitted to race at the stewards' discretion.

== Race ==
The race was held on 9 March 2024, at 20:00 local time (UTC+3), and was run for 50 laps.

=== Race report ===
At the starting grid, Norris appeared to jump the start but the stewards did not issue any penalty as the FIA's standardised grid box transponder did not detect an infringement. The sporting regulations require these transponders to detect an infringement for a penalty to be issued. There were two retirements. Before the race, on the formation lap, Pierre Gasly reported gearbox issues which forced him to retire before the start of the race. Lance Stroll retired on lap 7 due to a crash at Turn 23 which brought out a safety car. Kevin Magnussen of Haas accumulated 20 seconds worth of penalties. One of these was a 10-second penalty for a collision with Alexander Albon, and the other 10-second penalty was for overtaking Yuki Tsunoda off-track. Knowing that he was unlikely to finish in the points, the team ordered him to focus on defense during the wide parts of the circuit, and drive as slowly as possible in the narrow parts of the circuit while overtaking is most difficult. With Magnussen backing up the drivers behind, teammate Nico Hülkenberg successfully finished tenth and earned his and Haas's first point of the season.

Polesitter Max Verstappen won the race ahead of teammate Sergio Pérez, marking a second straight 1–2 for Red Bull Racing, with Ferrari's Charles Leclerc in third with one extra point for the fastest lap. This marked Verstappen's 100th career podium. McLaren's Oscar Piastri finished fourth with Aston Martin's Fernando Alonso in fifth. Mercedes's George Russell finished sixth with Ferrari debutant Oliver Bearman in seventh. They were followed by Lando Norris, who briefly led the Grand Prix, in eighth, and Lewis Hamilton in ninth, after both drivers attempted an alternate tyre strategy. Nico Hülkenberg claimed the final point in tenth, clinching his and Haas's first point of the season.

=== Race classification ===
Pos.	No.	Driver	Constructor	Laps	Time/Retired	Grid	Points
1	1	(Netherlands) Max Verstappen	Red Bull Racing-Honda RBPT	50	1:20:43.273	1	25
2	11	(Mexico) Sergio Pérez	Red Bull Racing-Honda RBPT	50	+13.643^{1}	3	18
3	16	(Monaco) Charles Leclerc	Ferrari	50	+18.639	2	16^{2}
4	81	(Australia) Oscar Piastri	McLaren-Mercedes	50	+32.007	5	12
5	14	(Spain) Fernando Alonso	Aston Martin Aramco-Mercedes	50	+35.759	4	10
6	63	(United Kingdom) George Russell	Mercedes	50	+39.936	7	8
7	38	(United Kingdom) Oliver Bearman	Ferrari	50	+42.679	11	6
8	4	(United Kingdom) Lando Norris	McLaren-Mercedes	50	+45.708	6	4
9	44	(United Kingdom) Lewis Hamilton	Mercedes	50	+47.391	8	2
10	27	(Germany) Nico Hülkenberg	Haas-Ferrari	50	+1:16.996	15	1
11	23	(Thailand) Alexander Albon	Williams-Mercedes	50	+1:28.354	12	
12	20	(Denmark) Kevin Magnussen	Haas-Ferrari	50	+1:45.737^{3}	13	
13	31	(France) Esteban Ocon	Alpine-Renault	49	+1 lap	17	
14	2	(United States) Logan Sargeant	Williams-Mercedes	49	+1 lap	19	
15	22	(Japan) Yuki Tsunoda	RB-Honda RBPT	49	+1 lap^{4}	9	
16	3	(Australia) Daniel Ricciardo	RB-Honda RBPT	49	+1 lap	14	
17	77	(Finland) Valtteri Bottas	Kick Sauber-Ferrari	49	+1 lap	16	
18	24	(China) Zhou Guanyu	Kick Sauber-Ferrari	49	+1 lap	20	
Ret	18	(Canada) Lance Stroll	Aston Martin Aramco-Mercedes	5	Accident	10	
Ret	10	(France) Pierre Gasly	Alpine-Renault	1	Gearbox	18	
Fastest lap: (Monaco) Charles Leclerc (Ferrari) – 1:31.632 (lap 50)

Notes

- ^1 – Sergio Pérez received a five-second time penalty for an unsafe release. His final position was not affected by the penalty.
- ^2 – Includes one point for fastest lap.
- ^3 – Kevin Magnussen finished 11th, but received two ten-second time penalties. The first was for causing a collision with Alexander Albon, and the second was for leaving the track and gaining an advantage while overtaking Yuki Tsunoda.
- ^4 – Yuki Tsunoda finished 14th on track, but received a post-race five-second time penalty for an unsafe release.

== Championship standings after the race ==
The result enabled Verstappen to extend his lead in the Drivers' Championship to 15 points over teammate Pérez, while Leclerc moved up to third in the standings with 28 points. Sainz, who finished third at the season opener in Bahrain, dropped down to sixth in the standings behind George Russell (18 points) and Oscar Piastri (16 points) following his non-participation in Saudi Arabia. In the Constructors' Championship, Red Bull moved to 87 points, extending their lead to 38 points over second-placed Ferrari, while McLaren advanced to third in the standings with 28 points, ahead of Mercedes that dropped down to fourth.

Drivers' Championship standings

	Pos.	Driver	Points
	1	(Netherlands) Max Verstappen	51
	2	(Mexico) Sergio Pérez	36
1	3	(Monaco) Charles Leclerc	28
1	4	(United Kingdom) George Russell	18
3	5	(Australia) Oscar Piastri	16

Constructors' Championship standings

	Pos.	Constructor	Points
	1	(Austria) Red Bull Racing-Honda RBPT	87
	2	(Italy) Ferrari	49
1	3	(United Kingdom) McLaren-Mercedes	28
1	4	(Germany) Mercedes	26
	5	(United Kingdom) Aston Martin Aramco-Mercedes	13

- Note: Only the top five positions are included for both sets of standings.

== See also ==
- 2024 Jeddah Formula 2 round

Previous race: 2024 Bahrain Grand Prix	FIA Formula One World Championship; 2024 season	Next race: 2024 Australian Grand Prix
Previous race: 2023 Saudi Arabian Grand Prix	Saudi Arabian Grand Prix	Next race: 2025 Saudi Arabian Grand Prix
