= 2023 Saudi Arabian Grand Prix =

Formula One motor race

Race 2 of 22 (Note: At the time of the event Formula One planned to hold twenty-three Grands Prix.) in the 2023 Formula One World Championship
← Previous race	Next race →
- The circuit layout

Race details
- Date: 19 March 2023
- Official name: Formula 1 STC Saudi Arabian Grand Prix 2023
- Location: Jeddah Corniche Circuit; Jeddah, Saudi Arabia
- Course: Street Circuit
- Course length: 6.174 km (3.836 miles)
- Distance: 50 laps, 308.450 km (191.662 miles)
- Weather: Clear
- Attendance: 150,000

Pole position
Driver	(Mexico) Sergio Pérez	Red Bull Racing-Honda RBPT
- Time: 1:28.265

Fastest lap
Driver	(Netherlands) Max Verstappen	Red Bull Racing-Honda RBPT
- Time: 1:31.906 on lap 50

Podium
First	(Mexico) Sergio Pérez	Red Bull Racing-Honda RBPT
Second	(Netherlands) Max Verstappen	Red Bull Racing-Honda RBPT
Third	(Spain) Fernando Alonso	Aston Martin-Mercedes

The 2023 Saudi Arabian Grand Prix (officially known as the Formula 1 STC Saudi Arabian Grand Prix 2023) was a Formula One motor race that was held on 19 March 2023 at the Jeddah Corniche Circuit in Jeddah, Saudi Arabia. It was the second round of the 2023 Formula One World Championship.

Red Bull Racing driver Sergio Pérez took his second career pole position, and won the race ahead of his teammate Max Verstappen in second and Fernando Alonso in third.

== Background ==
The event was held across the weekend of 17–19 March. It was the second round of the 2023 Formula One World Championship.

=== Championship standings before the race ===
Going into the weekend, Max Verstappen led the World Drivers' Championship with 25 points, 7 points from his teammate Sergio Pérez, second, and 10 from Fernando Alonso, third. Red Bull Racing led the Constructors' Championship from Aston Martin by 20 points and Mercedes by 27 points.

=== Entrants ===
The drivers and teams were the same as the season entry list with no additional stand-in drivers for the race.

=== Tyre choices ===
Tyre supplier Pirelli brought the C2, C3, and C4 tyre compounds (designated hard, medium, and soft, respectively) for teams to use at the event.

=== Track changes ===
Turns 22 and 23 were tightened and the walls were moved back at several corners, due to safety concerns relating to fast, blind corners. Kerbing was also altered to improve safety. Additionally, the third DRS detection point was moved farther ahead, being positioned on the exit of turn 27. As a result, the third DRS activation point was moved farther ahead, being positioned 170 metres (560 ft) after turn 27. Changes to the DRS zones were made in response to dangerous tactics employed at previous editions of the Grand Prix, where drivers would brake erratically for turn 27, in order to fall behind the opposition and gain the advantage of DRS.

== Practice ==
Three free practice sessions were held prior to qualifying, two on Friday and one on Saturday afternoon. The first practice session ended with Red Bull Racing's Max Verstappen setting the fastest time ahead of his teammate Sergio Pérez and Aston Martin's Fernando Alonso. His teammate Lance Stroll and Mercedes' George Russell capped off the top five. The second practice session saw Alonso split the Red Bull pairing of Verstappen and Pérez, ahead of Esteban Ocon and Russell. The third and final practice session ended with Verstappen and Pérez on top again ahead of the Aston Martin pairing, with Lewis Hamilton completing the top five.

== Qualifying ==
Qualifying was held on 18 March 2023, starting at 20:00 local time (UTC+3).

=== Qualifying report ===
The first segment ended with Yuki Tsunoda, Alexander Albon, Nyck de Vries, Lando Norris and Logan Sargeant setting the five slowest times resulting in their elimination. Norris broke the front-left suspension of his car through hitting a wall during his second timed lap, while Sargeant first had a lap time deleted for a track limit violation, spun on his second attempt to set a meaningful lap time and finally had to park his car trackside following a mechanical failure during his final attempt. This left him without a lap time within 107% of the fastest Q1 time. Sargeant was permitted to race by the stewards.

During the second segment Verstappen's car suddenly slowed down while trying to set his first fast lap. He was able to limp back to the pits, but what was later identified as a driveshaft failure prevented him from taking part in qualifying any further and this left him in fifteenth place. Nico Hülkenberg, Kevin Magnussen, Valtteri Bottas and Zhou Guanyu were eliminated alongside him.

During the final segment Pérez set the fastest time, taking his second career pole position. Leclerc set the second fastest time, but took a ten-place grid penalty after a new set of control electronics was installed on his car in breach of the allowed quota for the season. Alonso set the third fastest time ahead of Mercedes' George Russell. Carlos Sainz Jr. posted the fifth time in the second Ferrari ahead of Stroll and Alpine's Esteban Ocon. Hamilton, Oscar Piastri and Pierre Gasly completed the top ten.

=== Qualifying classification ===
Pos.	No.	Driver	Constructor	Qualifying times			Final grid
Pos.	No.	Driver	Constructor	Q1	Q2	Q3	Final grid
1	11	(Mexico) Sergio Pérez	Red Bull Racing-Honda RBPT	1:29.244	1:28.635	1:28.265	1
2	16	(Monaco) Charles Leclerc	Ferrari	1:29.376	1:28.903	1:28.420	12^{a}
3	14	(Spain) Fernando Alonso	Aston Martin Aramco-Mercedes	1:29.298	1:28.757	1:28.730	2
4	63	(United Kingdom) George Russell	Mercedes	1:29.592	1:29.132	1:28.857	3
5	55	(Spain) Carlos Sainz Jr.	Ferrari	1:29.411	1:28.957	1:28.931	4
6	18	(Canada) Lance Stroll	Aston Martin Aramco-Mercedes	1:29.335	1:28.962	1:28.945	5
7	31	(France) Esteban Ocon	Alpine-Renault	1:29.707	1:29.255	1:29.078	6
8	44	(United Kingdom) Lewis Hamilton	Mercedes	1:29.689	1:29.374	1:29.223	7
9	81	(Australia) Oscar Piastri	McLaren-Mercedes	1:29.706	1:29.378	1:29.243	8
10	10	(France) Pierre Gasly	Alpine-Renault	1:29.890	1:29.411	1:29.357	9
11	27	(Germany) Nico Hülkenberg	Haas-Ferrari	1:29.547	1:29.451	N/A	10
12	24	(China) Zhou Guanyu	Alfa Romeo-Ferrari	1:29.654	1:29.461	N/A	11
13	20	(Denmark) Kevin Magnussen	Haas-Ferrari	1:29.744	1:29.634	N/A	13
14	77	(Finland) Valtteri Bottas	Alfa Romeo-Ferrari	1:29.929	1:29.668	N/A	14
15	1	(Netherlands) Max Verstappen	Red Bull Racing-Honda RBPT	1:28.761	1:49.953	N/A	15
16	22	(Japan) Yuki Tsunoda	AlphaTauri-Honda RBPT	1:29.939	N/A	N/A	16
17	23	(Thailand) Alexander Albon	Williams-Mercedes	1:29.994	N/A	N/A	17
18	21	(Netherlands) Nyck de Vries	AlphaTauri-Honda RBPT	1:30.244	N/A	N/A	18
19	4	(United Kingdom) Lando Norris	McLaren-Mercedes	1:30.447	N/A	N/A	19
107% time: 1:34.974
—	2	(United States) Logan Sargeant	Williams-Mercedes	2:08.510	N/A	N/A	20^{b}

Notes

- ^a – Charles Leclerc received a ten-place grid penalty for exceeding his quota of control electronics elements.
- ^b – Logan Sargeant failed to set a time within the 107% requirement. He was permitted to race at the stewards' discretion.

== Race ==
The race was held on 19 March 2023, starting at 20:00 local time (UTC+3).

=== Race report ===
After the end of the formation lap, Alonso lined up with the left side of his car outside of the starting position on the grid. At the start, he managed to squeeze past Pérez to take the lead, with Russell following third place. However, he was soon handed a five-second penalty for not properly lining up his car on the starting grid. Behind them Stroll overtook Sainz for fourth place, with Ocon and Hamilton behind them. Piastri, who had started in eighth place, made contact with Gasly while exiting turn two and this forced him to make a pit stop for a new front wing. His teammate Norris ran over the debris left from the coming together and he was required to make a pitstop as well, one lap later. This left the McLaren pairing at the back of the field. Leclerc and Zhou completed the top ten behind Gasly, with the Monegasque having gained four places from his starting position.

Alonso was able to stay in the lead for three laps, before being passed by Pérez. The top ten then remained relatively stable for a couple of laps, with Leclerc passing Gasly to take eight place during lap seven. Meanwhile, Verstappen was also recovering from his starting position down the order, entering the top ten during lap eight at the expense of Zhou. He gained another place one lap later, passing Gasly, while Leclerc also continued to move forward, through passing Hamilton. Three laps later Verstappen managed to overtake Hamilton as well and one lap later he and Leclerc both passed Ocon.

In the meantime, during lap twelve, Zhou and Hülkenberg were the first drivers to make a regular pitstop for a fresh set of tyres. One lap later, Lance Stroll became the first of the front runners to follow suit, all three of them switching from the medium to the hardest compound in a bid to complete the race with one tyre change. This dropped Stroll to eleventh place. Gasly made his tyre change and the end of the next lap. Sainz, Leclerc and Ocon followed suit during the next two laps, with Sainz rejoining the track ahead of Stroll. This all promoted Verstappen to third place. Shortly afterwards, during lap seventeen, Stroll was suddenly asked to stop his car on track over his team's radio and duly did so in a service area on the outside of turn thirteen. Nevertheless, the safety car was deployed shortly afterwards. This prompted all drivers who had not yet made their regular tyre changes (including the then top five of Pérez, Alonso, Russell, Verstappen and Hamilton) to come into the pits to perform the change, while Alonso also served his five-second time penalty.

The safety car left the track at the end of lap twenty to allow normal racing to resume. Pérez led from Alonso, ahead of Russell in third and Verstappen now fourth. Sainz completed the top five. Over the next two Laps, Hamilton passed Sainz for fifth place and Verstappen Russell for third respectively. At the end of the following lap Verstappen passed Alonso to move into second place.

During lap twenty-eight, Albon was forced to retire his Williams because of a brake failure. The top ten was Pérez, Verstappen, Alonso, Russell, Hamilton, Sainz, Leclerc, Ocon, and Gasly, with Tsunoda joining them. This order remained stable for the next eighteen laps, when Magnussen passed Tsunoda to snatch the final points.

During the final laps first Mercedes and then Aston Martin mentioned over the radio that Alonso could potentially incur an additional penalty of five seconds. Alonso reacted to this by extending his gap over Russell to over five seconds, despite no official message citing an investigation being shown. Despite both reporting issues with their cars, Pérez and Verstappen easily finished first and second, with Verstappen posting the fastest lap during the last lap and taking the extra point to retain the championship lead. Alonso finished third, making him the sixth driver to have scored 100 podiums in his Formula One career, ahead of Russell and Hamilton. Sainz, Leclerc, Ocon, Gasly and Magnussen completed the top ten.

=== Post-race ===
Shortly after the podium ceremony, an official message was shown that Alonso was under investigation for not having served the first penalty correctly at his pit stop. Minutes later he was handed a ten-second penalty dropping him to fourth behind Russell. The reason given for the ten-second penalty was due to the fact that the rear jack was touching the car while the five-second penalty was still being served, in addition to another mechanic potentially making contact with the car in the same period of time. However, Aston Martin requested a further review of the penalty, and upon analysing the additional evidence the stewards decided to rescind the penalty and have Alonso's third place reinstated. Alonso criticised the FIA for its delayed response, having been informed of his penalty after the podium celebrations; Russell criticised the penalties as being "too extreme". The FIA clarified the matter before the next round of the championship, stating that neither jacks, nor any other tools or mechanics can touch the car when a driver serves their penalty at a pit stop. On 4 March 2024, the BBC reported that FIA president Mohammed Ben Sulayem was being investigated for allegedly influencing the stewards decision to overturn Alonso's penalty.

=== Race classification ===
Pos.	No.	Driver	Constructor	Laps	Time/Retired	Grid	Points
1	11	(Mexico) Sergio Pérez	Red Bull Racing-Honda RBPT	50	1:21:14.894	1	25
2	1	(Netherlands) Max Verstappen	Red Bull Racing-Honda RBPT	50	+5.355	15	19^{a}
3	14	(Spain) Fernando Alonso	Aston Martin Aramco-Mercedes	50	+20.728	2	15
4	63	(United Kingdom) George Russell	Mercedes	50	+25.866	3	12
5	44	(United Kingdom) Lewis Hamilton	Mercedes	50	+31.065	7	10
6	55	(Spain) Carlos Sainz Jr.	Ferrari	50	+35.876	4	8
7	16	(Monaco) Charles Leclerc	Ferrari	50	+43.162	12	6
8	31	(France) Esteban Ocon	Alpine-Renault	50	+52.832	6	4
9	10	(France) Pierre Gasly	Alpine-Renault	50	+54.747	9	2
10	20	(Denmark) Kevin Magnussen	Haas-Ferrari	50	+1:04.826	13	1
11	22	(Japan) Yuki Tsunoda	AlphaTauri-Honda RBPT	50	+1:07.494	16	
12	27	(Germany) Nico Hülkenberg	Haas-Ferrari	50	+1:10.588	10	
13	24	(China) Zhou Guanyu	Alfa Romeo-Ferrari	50	+1:16.060	11	
14	21	(Netherlands) Nyck de Vries	AlphaTauri-Honda RBPT	50	+1:17.478	18	
15	81	(Australia) Oscar Piastri	McLaren-Mercedes	50	+1:25.021	8	
16	2	(United States) Logan Sargeant	Williams-Mercedes	50	+1:26.293	20	
17	4	(United Kingdom) Lando Norris	McLaren-Mercedes	50	+1:26.445	19	
18	77	(Finland) Valtteri Bottas	Alfa Romeo-Ferrari	49	+1 lap	14	
Ret	23	(Thailand) Alexander Albon	Williams-Mercedes	27	Brakes	17	
Ret	18	(Canada) Lance Stroll	Aston Martin Aramco-Mercedes	16	Engine	5	
Fastest lap: (Netherlands) Max Verstappen (Red Bull Racing-Honda RBPT) – 1:31.906 (lap 50)

Notes

- ^a – Includes one point for fastest lap.

== Championship standings after the race ==
Drivers' Championship standings

Pos.	Driver	Points
1	(Netherlands) Max Verstappen	44
2	(Mexico) Sergio Pérez	43
3	(Spain) Fernando Alonso	30
4	(Spain) Carlos Sainz Jr.	20
5	(United Kingdom) Lewis Hamilton	20

Constructors' Championship standings

	Pos.	Constructor	Points
	1	(Austria) Red Bull Racing-Honda RBPT	87
	2	(United Kingdom) Aston Martin Aramco-Mercedes	38
	3	(Germany) Mercedes	38
	4	(Italy) Ferrari	26
1	5	(France) Alpine-Renault	8

- Note: Only the top five positions are included for both sets of standings.

== See also ==
- 2023 Jeddah Formula 2 round

== Notes ==
Previous race: 2023 Bahrain Grand Prix	FIA Formula One World Championship; 2023 season	Next race: 2023 Australian Grand Prix
Previous race: 2022 Saudi Arabian Grand Prix	Saudi Arabian Grand Prix	Next race: 2024 Saudi Arabian Grand Prix
