= Qiddiya Speed Park Track =

Motor racing circuit in Qiddiya City, Saudi Arabia

Qiddiya Speed Park Track مضمار السرعة بالقدية
- Location: Qiddiya City, Riyadh Province, Saudi Arabia
- Coordinates: 24.582429°N 46.322565°E
- Owner: Qiddiya Investment Company
- Opened: 2028 (planned)
- Construction cost: US$480 million
- Architect: Hermann Tilke; Alexander Wurz
- Major events: Planned: Formula One; Saudi Arabian Grand Prix (2028)
- Website: Speed Park Track
- Turns: 21

The Qiddiya Speed Park Track (Note: Arabic: مضمار السرعة (romanized: Miḍmār al-Surʿa), officially Speed Park Track, but commonly referred to as Qiddiya Speed Park Track) is a planned motor racing circuit currently under construction in Qiddiya City, Saudi Arabia. The circuit is planned to host the Saudi Arabian Grand Prix from 2028 onwards, replacing the Jeddah Corniche Circuit.

== History ==
On 5 March 2024, Qiddiya Investment Company announced plans for the Speed Park Track in Qiddiya City. The announcement formed part of the broader development plans for the Qiddiya project in Riyadh Province.

The circuit was designed by former Formula One driver Alexander Wurz in collaboration with circuit designer Hermann Tilke.

== Layout ==
The circuit is located within the Qiddiya City megaproject and runs alongside the Six Flags Qiddiya City amusement park and the Falcons Flight roller coaster.

The track was designed by Hermann Tilke and former Formula One driver Alexander Wurz. It will feature 21 corners and run counter-clockwise. The official length of the Qiddiya Speed Park Track has not yet been confirmed, but it is expected to be longer than the Circuit de Spa-Francorchamps, which is 7.004 km (4.352 mi) long.

The first corner, nicknamed the "Blade" is planned to be positioned above a concert venue and is expected to reach over 70 m (230 ft) in elevation with a grade of 10 degrees.
