= Jeddah Corniche =

Coastal area in Jeddah, Saudi Arabia

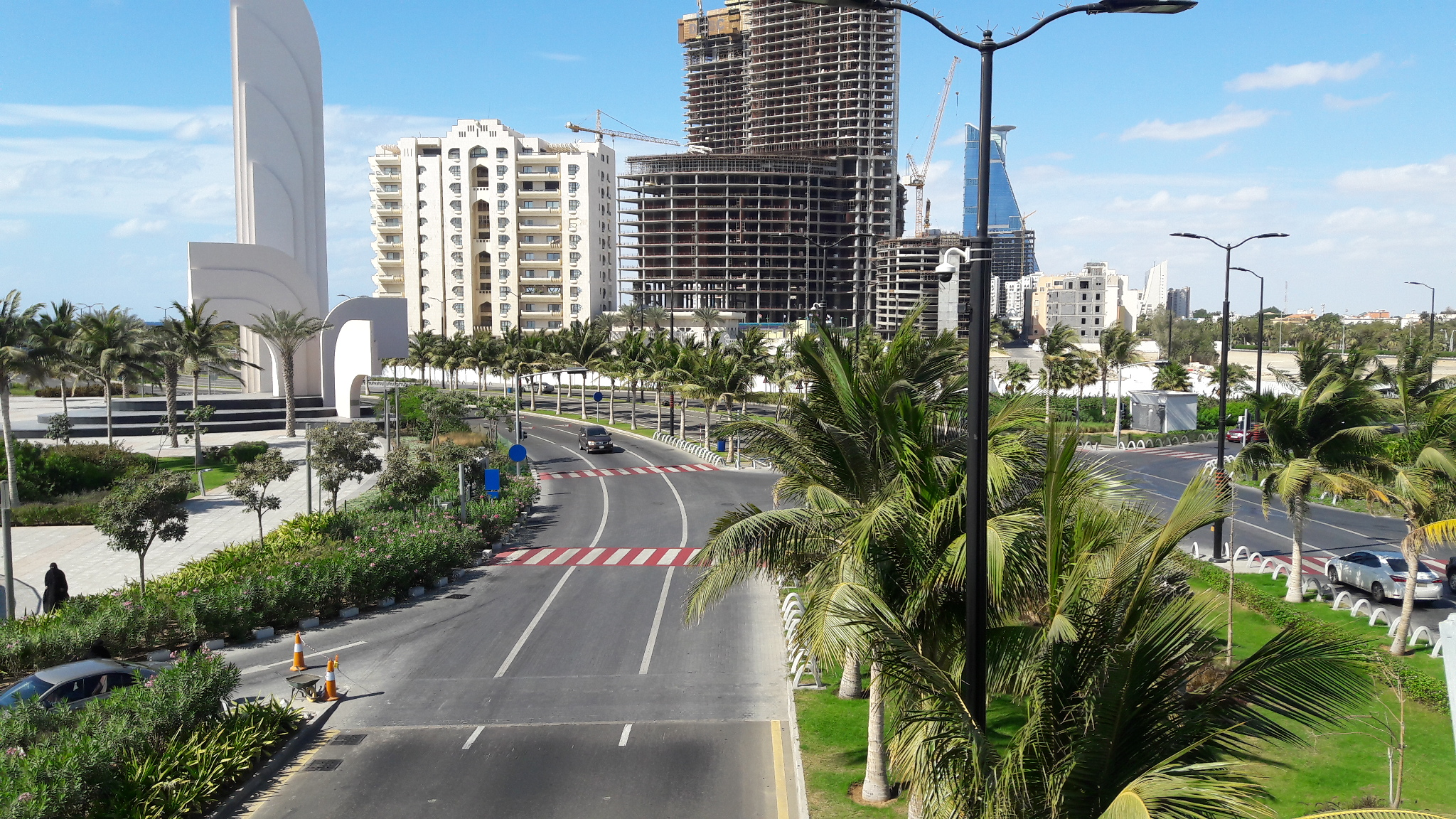
- View on the corniche

- Location within Saudi Arabia
- Coordinates: 21°36′07.4″N 39°06′26.4″E
- Country: Saudi Arabia
- City: Jeddah
- Established: 2017

Dimensions
  - Length: 4.2 km (2.6 mi)

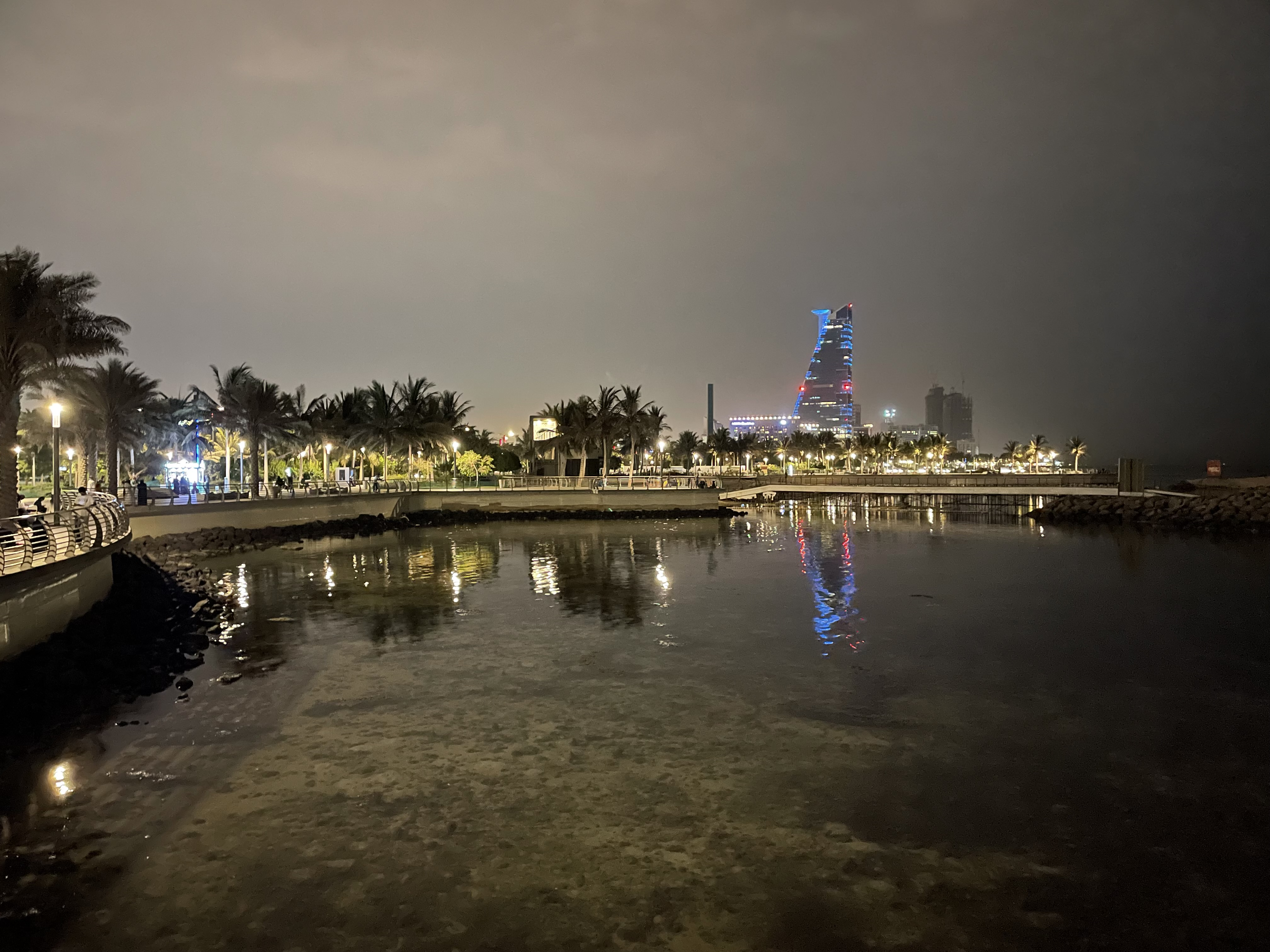
Jeddah Corniche at night

The Jeddah Corniche, also known as the Jeddah Waterfront (JW), is a 30 km coastal resort area of the city of Jeddah, Saudi Arabia. Located along the Red Sea, the corniche features a coastal road, recreation areas, pavilions and large-scale civic sculptures as well as King Fahd's Fountain, the highest fountain in the world. Also located here is the Al-Rahmah Mosque (formerly known as the Fatimah Mosque), which is a popular attraction to visitors.

The Jeddah Corniche derives its name from the original French and Italian term for a coastal road, especially a road along the face of a cliff.

In November 2017, the waterfront was inaugurated for visitors with the goal of being a tourist attraction in the city. It was launched as a response to a royal decree with the aim of improving the public facilities of the city of Jeddah. The established area is equipped with many facilities including restaurants, retail outlets, hotels, aquarium, cultural centre, water dancing fountain, blossoming gardens and fountains.

== Inauguration ==
Jeddah Waterfront project was inaugurated by Makkah Gov. Prince Khaled Al-Faisal on 30 November 2017. It was also attended by Jeddah Gov. Prince Mishaal bin Majid and Deputy Gov. Prince Abdullah bin Bandar.

== Location ==
The waterfront occupies an area of 730,000 square metres over 4.2 kilometres of Jeddah's Red Sea coastline.

== The logo and the design ==
The waterfront's logo is designed as a group of seagulls.

== Cost ==
The budget allocated for the project is US$212.3 million.

== Facilities ==
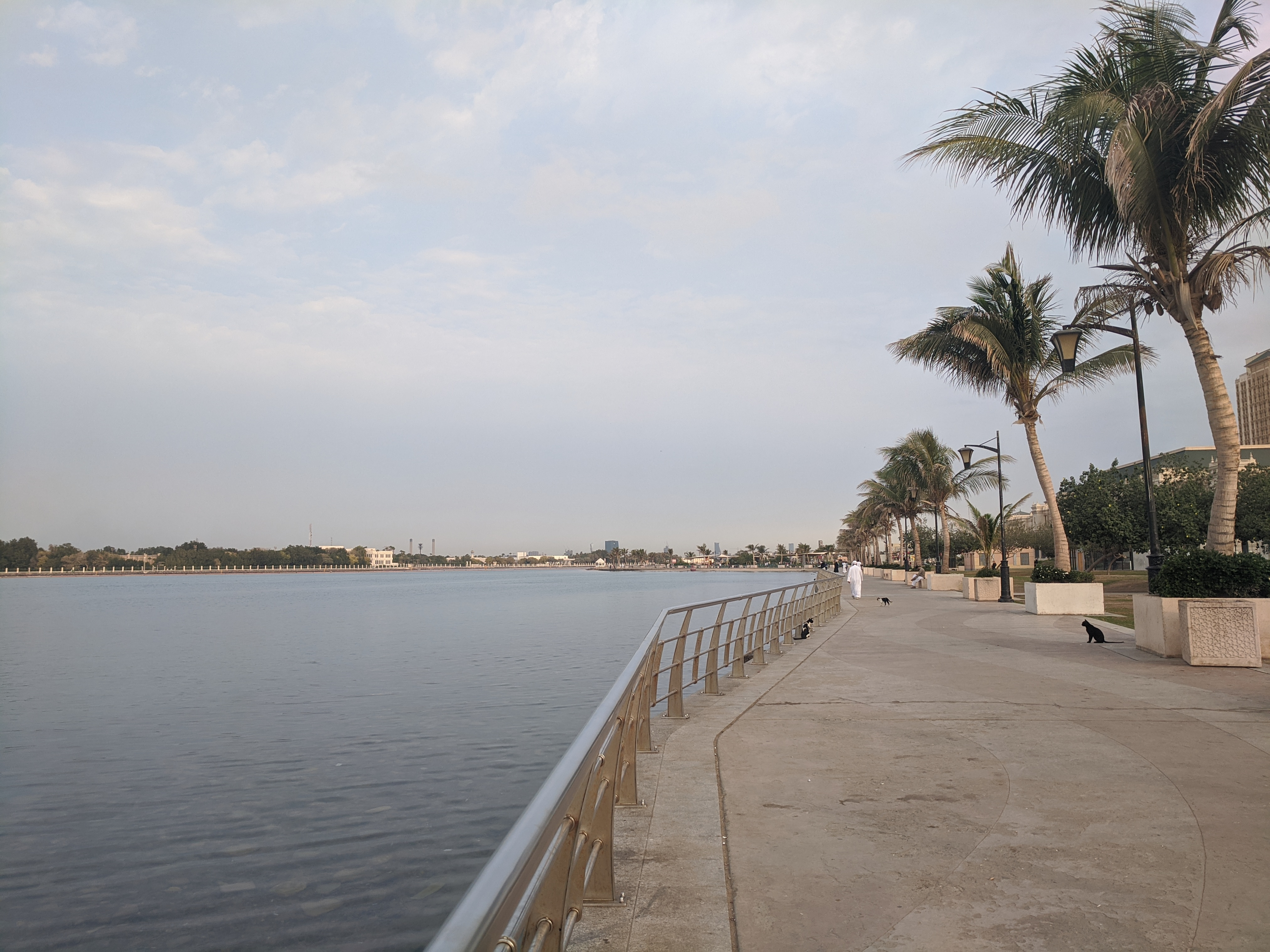
A section of the Jeddah Corniche

The area that can accommodate 120,000 people and has a parking lot for 3,000 cars is also equipped with many facilities including 100 bathrooms, restaurants, retail outlets, hotels, aquarium, cultural centre, water dancing fountain, blossoming gardens, fountains, kiosks, phone charging stations, children's play parks, beaches and facilities for people with disabilities. Jeddah Waterfront is organized in a way that makes it suitable and enjoyable for people of different ages and interests. It is divided into a number of areas some of them are allocated for children to play safely and others are designed for athletes and those who want to exercise outdoors. Moreover, Jeddah Waterfront has three sandy beaches where people can swim and enjoy the warm sun of Jeddah. There are also many spots that are planted with grass where families and friends can meet. People can also use the 25 huts scattered in different spots. The three sandy beaches designed for swimmers are fronted with man-made islands that are given the shape of a crescent moon and planted with palms trees. A man-made island formed in the shape of a crescent moon has been planted with dozens of palm trees. Jeddah Waterfront is also equipped with a hundred surveillance cameras as well as Wi-Fi service.

The Jeddah Corniche Circuit, which is hosting the Saudi Arabian Grand Prix since 2021 is located here. However, Jeddah Circuit is set to be replaced by Qiddiya Speed Park Track from 2028 onward.
