= 2024 Australian Grand Prix =

Third round of the 2024 F1 season

Race 3 of 24 in the 2024 Formula One World Championship
← Previous race	Next race →
- Layout of the Albert Park Circuit

Race details
- Date: 24 March 2024
- Official name: Formula 1 Rolex Australian Grand Prix 2024
- Location: Albert Park Circuit; Melbourne, Victoria, Australia
- Course: Street Circuit
- Course length: 5.278 km (3.280 miles)
- Distance: 58 laps, 306.124 km (190.217 miles)
- Weather: Sunny
- Attendance: 452,055

Pole position
Driver	(Netherlands) Max Verstappen	Red Bull Racing-Honda RBPT
- Time: 1:15.915

Fastest lap
Driver	(Monaco) Charles Leclerc	Ferrari
- Time: 1:19.813 on lap 56 (lap record)

Podium
First	(Spain) Carlos Sainz Jr.	Ferrari
Second	(Monaco) Charles Leclerc	Ferrari
Third	(United Kingdom) Lando Norris	McLaren-Mercedes

The 2024 Australian Grand Prix (officially known as the Formula 1 Rolex Australian Grand Prix 2024) was a Formula One motor race held on 24 March 2024 at the Albert Park Circuit in Melbourne, Victoria. It was the third round of the 2024 Formula One World Championship.

After qualifying second, Ferrari's Carlos Sainz Jr. won the race, two weeks after undergoing an appendectomy that caused him to miss the preceding Saudi Arabian Grand Prix. Pole-sitter Max Verstappen retired on lap four, breaking his streak of nine consecutive wins. Sainz's teammate, Charles Leclerc, followed in second for Ferrari's first 1–2 finish since the 2022 Bahrain Grand Prix. Lando Norris finished third, surpassing Nick Heidfeld's record for the most podiums without a win in Formula One at fourteen; Norris would hold this record until he won his first race three Grands Prix later, at the Miami Grand Prix, thereby handing the record back to Heidfeld. The event sold out for the first time in its history and set a new attendance record at the circuit for the weekend.

The result allowed both Leclerc and Ferrari to reduce the points deficit in both World Championships to four points to Verstappen and Red Bull, respectively. Sainz's race win promoted him to fourth in the championship, 11 points behind Verstappen.

== Background ==
The event was held at Albert Park Circuit in Melbourne for the 27th time in the circuit's history, across the weekend of 22–24 March. The Grand Prix was the third round of the 2024 Formula One World Championship and the 87th running of the Australian Grand Prix.

=== Championship standings before the race ===
Ahead of the weekend race, Max Verstappen led the Drivers' Championship with 51 points, 15 points from his teammate Sergio Pérez in second, and 23 from Charles Leclerc in third. Red Bull Racing led the Constructors' Championship on 87 points, separated from Ferrari by 38 points and McLaren by 59, in second and third, respectively.

=== Entrants ===
The drivers and teams were initially the same as the season entry list with no additional stand-in drivers for the race. However, as Williams was unable to repair damage to Alexander Albon's chassis following a crash during the first free practice session, he was swapped into Logan Sargeant's car, with Sargeant missing the remainder of the Grand Prix weekend. Daniel Ricciardo of RB and Oscar Piastri of McLaren were the first pair of Australian drivers competing at their home Grand Prix since Ricciardo and Mark Webber in 2013.

=== Tyre choices ===
Tyre supplier Pirelli brought the C3, C4, and C5 tyre compounds (the softest three in their range) designated hard, medium, and soft, respectively, for teams to use at the event. The tyre compounds selected were one set softer than the previous edition of the race.

=== Safety changes ===
After the Australian Grand Prix Corporation was held responsible for safety breaches in the 2023 edition of the race, spectators were banned from going on the track at any stage of the event, overruling a previous tradition that allowed patrons access after a race. Fines of more than $AUD17,000, eviction from the event, and bans in future races could be imposed if fans enter the track.

== Practice ==
Three free practice sessions were held for the event. The first free practice session was held on 22 March 2024, at 12:30 local time (UTC+11), and was topped by Lando Norris of McLaren ahead of Max Verstappen of Red Bull Racing and George Russell of Mercedes. The session was red-flagged after Alexander Albon of Williams crashed at turn 6.

The second free practice session was held on the same day, at 16:00 local time, and was topped by Charles Leclerc of Ferrari ahead of Verstappen of Red Bull Racing and Leclerc's teammate Carlos Sainz Jr. Albon's crash in the first free practice session forced him to miss the second, as Williams had no spare chassis available. Albon's damaged chassis was ultimately deemed unrepairable, and he swapped to his teammate Logan Sargeant's car. As a result, Sargeant sat out for the remainder of the weekend. The third free practice session was held on 23 March 2024, at 12:30 local time, and was again topped by Leclerc, ahead of Verstappen and Sainz.

== Qualifying ==
Qualifying was held on 23 March 2024, at 16:00 local time (UTC+11).

=== Qualifying report ===
The first session (Q1) saw Carlos Sainz Jr. of Ferrari setting the fastest time ahead of Sergio Pérez and Max Verstappen of Red Bull Racing. Daniel Ricciardo of RB, who had originally been in tenth, had his lap time deleted due to track limits, resulting in him being eighteenth. He joined Nico Hülkenberg of Haas, Pierre Gasly of Alpine, and Zhou Guanyu of Sauber in elimination. The second session (Q2) was topped again by Sainz ahead of his teammate Charles Leclerc and Verstappen. Lewis Hamilton of Mercedes was eliminated in Q2, and was joined by Alexander Albon of Williams, Valtteri Bottas of Sauber, Kevin Magnussen of Haas, and Gasly's teammate Esteban Ocon, who had managed to get the Alpine to Q2 for the first time in the season.

Verstappen set the fastest time in the third session to earn pole position, followed by Sainz, to join him in the front row of the grid. Verstappen's teammate Sergio Pérez qualified third, ahead Lando Norris of McLaren who took fourth. After an investigation by the stewards, Pérez was handed a three-place grid penalty for impeding Hülkenberg in Q1, moving Norris to third, Sainz's teammate Charles Leclerc to fourth, and Norris's teammate Oscar Piastri to fifth, leaving Pérez to start the race in sixth. Gasly was also investigated for crossing the pit lane exit line in Q1 and was issued a reprimand.

=== Qualifying classification ===
Pos.	No.	Driver	Constructor	Qualifying times			Final grid
Pos.	No.	Driver	Constructor	Q1	Q2	Q3	Final grid
1	1	(Netherlands) Max Verstappen	Red Bull Racing-Honda RBPT	1:16.819	1:16.387	1:15.915	1
2	55	(Spain) Carlos Sainz Jr.	Ferrari	1:16.731	1:16.189	1:16.185	2
3	11	(Mexico) Sergio Pérez	Red Bull Racing-Honda RBPT	1:16.805	1:16.631	1:16.274	6^{a}
4	4	(United Kingdom) Lando Norris	McLaren-Mercedes	1:17.430	1:16.750	1:16.315	3
5	16	(Monaco) Charles Leclerc	Ferrari	1:16.984	1:16.304	1:16.435	4
6	81	(Australia) Oscar Piastri	McLaren-Mercedes	1:17.369	1:16.601	1:16.572	5
7	63	(United Kingdom) George Russell	Mercedes	1:17.062	1:16.901	1:16.724	7
8	22	(Japan) Yuki Tsunoda	RB-Honda RBPT	1:17.356	1:16.791	1:16.788	8
9	18	(Canada) Lance Stroll	Aston Martin Aramco-Mercedes	1:17.376	1:16.780	1:17.072	9
10	14	(Spain) Fernando Alonso	Aston Martin Aramco-Mercedes	1:16.991	1:16.710	1:17.552	10
11	44	(United Kingdom) Lewis Hamilton	Mercedes	1:17.499	1:16.960	N/A	11
12	23	(Thailand) Alexander Albon	Williams-Mercedes	1:17.130	1:17.167	N/A	12
13	77	(Finland) Valtteri Bottas	Kick Sauber-Ferrari	1:17.543	1:17.340	N/A	13
14	20	(Denmark) Kevin Magnussen	Haas-Ferrari	1:17.709	1:17.427	N/A	14
15	31	(France) Esteban Ocon	Alpine-Renault	1:17.617	1:17.697	N/A	15
16	27	(Germany) Nico Hülkenberg	Haas-Ferrari	1:17.976	N/A	N/A	16
17	10	(France) Pierre Gasly	Alpine-Renault	1:17.982	N/A	N/A	17
18	3	(Australia) Daniel Ricciardo	RB-Honda RBPT	1:18.085	N/A	N/A	18
19	24	(China) Zhou Guanyu	Kick Sauber-Ferrari	1:18.188	N/A	N/A	PL^{b}
107% time: 1:22.731

Notes

- ^a – Sergio Pérez received a three-place grid penalty for impeding Nico Hülkenberg in Q1.
- ^b – Zhou Guanyu qualified 19th, but was required to start the race from the pit lane for a spare front-wing change which did not match the original specifications.

== Race ==
The race was held on 24 March 2024, at 15:00 local time (UTC+11), and was run for 58 laps.

=== Race report ===
Polesitter Max Verstappen of Red Bull Racing led the opening lap before being overtaken by Carlos Sainz Jr. of Ferrari on lap two, after Verstappen reported brake issues. Verstappen soon retired from the race due to a brake failure, returning to the pit lane on the fourth lap. Sainz led for the majority of the race and won his first Grand Prix since the 2023 Singapore Grand Prix, with teammate Charles Leclerc taking second after completing an undercut on Lando Norris of McLaren in the early stages of the race. Norris's teammate Oscar Piastri took fourth, followed by the Red Bull Racing of Sergio Pérez in fifth. During the closing stages of the race, George Russell of Mercedes fought for sixth place against Fernando Alonso of Aston Martin. He crashed at turn 6 on the last lap, allowing Alonso and his Aston Martin teammate Lance Stroll to finish in sixth and seventh, respectively. Russell joined his teammate Lewis Hamilton, who retired mid-race due to power unit issues. Yuki Tsunoda earned points for RB, finishing eighth on track, for the first time in the season. Nico Hülkenberg and Kevin Magnussen of Haas scored double points after finishing in ninth and tenth, respectively. Following similar issues during the last two Grands Prix, both Sauber drivers experienced pit stop problems, including wheel nut issues for Bottas, during the race.

Ferrari completed the race with their first one-two finish since the 2022 Bahrain Grand Prix. Norris surpassed Nick Heidfeld for the most podiums by a driver without a win with his fourteenth podium finish. Red Bull Racing's Verstappen missed his tenth consecutive win, having retired for the first time since the 2022 edition of the race. Sainz's victory was the third of his Formula One career and first in Australia, and brought him to fourth in the Drivers' Championship behind Verstappen, Leclerc, and Pérez.

=== Post-race ===
After the race, Fernando Alonso, who finished sixth on track, was given a drive-through penalty, which was converted to a twenty-second time penalty, for "potentially dangerous driving" prior to Russell's last lap crash. He was dropped to eighth place, with Yuki Tsunoda being promoted to seventh and Lance Stroll sixth.

The event sold out for the first time in its history, and set a new attendance record at the circuit for the weekend with 452,055 spectators, making it the most attended sporting event ever in Melbourne, and the third highest attended Formula One Grand Prix of all time, following the 1995 edition of the race, held in Adelaide, with 520,000, and the 2023 British Grand Prix, with 480,000.

The result enabled both Leclerc and Ferrari to reduce the points deficit in both World Championships to four points to Verstappen and Red Bull, respectively. Pérez was demoted to third in the Drivers' Standings with 46 points after being overtaken by Leclerc who moved to 47 points. Sainz's race win promoted him to fourth in the championship, eleven points behind Verstappen, while Oscar Piastri remained fifth with 28 points.

=== Race classification ===
Pos.	No.	Driver	Constructor	Laps	Time/Retired	Grid	Points
1	55	(Spain) Carlos Sainz Jr.	Ferrari	58	1:20:26.843	2	25
2	16	(Monaco) Charles Leclerc	Ferrari	58	+2.366	4	19^{a}
3	4	(United Kingdom) Lando Norris	McLaren-Mercedes	58	+5.904	3	15
4	81	(Australia) Oscar Piastri	McLaren-Mercedes	58	+35.770	5	12
5	11	(Mexico) Sergio Pérez	Red Bull Racing-Honda RBPT	58	+56.309	6	10
6	18	(Canada) Lance Stroll	Aston Martin Aramco-Mercedes	58	+1:33.222	9	8
7	22	(Japan) Yuki Tsunoda	RB-Honda RBPT	58	+1:35.601	8	6
8	14	(Spain) Fernando Alonso	Aston Martin Aramco-Mercedes	58	+1:40.992^{b}	10	4
9	27	(Germany) Nico Hülkenberg	Haas-Ferrari	58	+1:44.553	16	2
10	20	(Denmark) Kevin Magnussen	Haas-Ferrari	57	+1 lap	14	1
11	23	(Thailand) Alexander Albon	Williams-Mercedes	57	+1 lap	12	
12	3	(Australia) Daniel Ricciardo	RB-Honda RBPT	57	+1 lap	18	
13	10	(France) Pierre Gasly	Alpine-Renault	57	+1 lap^{c}	17	
14	77	(Finland) Valtteri Bottas	Kick Sauber-Ferrari	57	+1 lap	13	
15	24	(China) Zhou Guanyu	Kick Sauber-Ferrari	57	+1 lap	PL	
16	31	(France) Esteban Ocon	Alpine-Renault	57	+1 lap	15	
17^{d}	63	(United Kingdom) George Russell	Mercedes	56	Accident	7	
Ret	44	(United Kingdom) Lewis Hamilton	Mercedes	15	Power unit	11	
Ret	1	(Netherlands) Max Verstappen	Red Bull Racing-Honda RBPT	3	Brakes	1	
Fastest lap: (Monaco) Charles Leclerc (Ferrari) – 1:19.813 (lap 56)

Notes

- ^a – Includes one point for fastest lap.
- ^b – Fernando Alonso finished sixth on track, but received a post-race drive-through penalty converted into a twenty-second time penalty for "potentially dangerous driving".
- ^c – Pierre Gasly received a five-second time penalty for crossing the line at the pit exit. His final position was not affected by the penalty.
- ^d – George Russell was classified as he completed more than 90% of the race distance.

== Championship standings after the race ==
Drivers' Championship standings

	Pos.	Driver	Points
	1	(Netherlands) Max Verstappen	51
1	2	(Monaco) Charles Leclerc	47
1	3	(Mexico) Sergio Pérez	46
2	4	(Spain) Carlos Sainz Jr.	40
	5	(Australia) Oscar Piastri	28

Constructors' Championship standings

Pos.	Constructor	Points
1	(Austria) Red Bull Racing-Honda RBPT	97
2	(Italy) Ferrari	93
3	(United Kingdom) McLaren-Mercedes	55
4	(Germany) Mercedes	26
5	(United Kingdom) Aston Martin Aramco-Mercedes	25

- Note: Only the top five positions are included for both sets of standings.

== See also ==
- 2024 Melbourne Formula 2 round
- 2024 Melbourne Formula 3 round

Previous race: 2024 Saudi Arabian Grand Prix	FIA Formula One World Championship; 2024 season	Next race: 2024 Japanese Grand Prix
Previous race: 2023 Australian Grand Prix	Australian Grand Prix	Next race: 2025 Australian Grand Prix
