= 2022 Australian Grand Prix =

Third round of the 2022 Formula One season

Race 3 of 22 (Note: At the time of the event Formula One planned to hold twenty-three Grands Prix.) in the 2022 Formula One World Championship
← Previous race	Next race →
- Layout of the Albert Park Circuit

Race details
- Date: 10 April 2022
- Official name: Formula 1 Heineken Australian Grand Prix 2022
- Location: Albert Park Circuit, Melbourne, Australia
- Course: Temporary street circuit
- Course length: 5.278 km (3.280 miles)
- Distance: 58 laps, 306.124 km (190.217 miles)
- Weather: Partly cloudy
- Attendance: 419,114

Pole position
Driver	(Monaco) Charles Leclerc	Ferrari
- Time: 1:17.868

Fastest lap
Driver	(Monaco) Charles Leclerc	Ferrari
- Time: 1:20.260 on lap 58

Podium
First	(Monaco) Charles Leclerc	Ferrari
Second	(Mexico) Sergio Pérez	Red Bull Racing-RBPT
Third	(United Kingdom) George Russell	Mercedes

The 2022 Australian Grand Prix (officially known as the Formula 1 Heineken Australian Grand Prix 2022) was a Formula One motor race that was held on 10 April 2022 in Melbourne, Victoria. It was contested at the Albert Park Circuit and was the third round of the 2022 Formula One World Championship. Ferrari's Charles Leclerc scored his first career grand slam, having started in pole position, set the fastest lap, led every lap, and won the race ahead of Red Bull's Sergio Pérez and Mercedes's George Russell. It was the first grand slam for a Ferrari driver since Fernando Alonso's at the 2010 Singapore Grand Prix. (Note: Ferrari had a grand slam at the 2022 Bahrain Grand Prix, which was achieved between two drivers.)

It was the 85th race in the combined history of the Australian Grand Prix, which dates back to the 100 Miles Road Race of 1928, as well as the 25th time the event had been held at the Albert Park circuit and the 36th time the Australian Grand Prix has been a part of the Formula One World Championship. It was the first Australian Grand Prix since 2019, with the 2020 edition having been cancelled hours before the first practice session was due to begin amid the beginning of the COVID-19 pandemic and the 2021 edition was first postponed and later cancelled due to the effects of the COVID-19 pandemic in Australia. Valtteri Bottas was the defending race winner, having won the 2019 edition with Mercedes. The 2022 edition set a then-new attendance record at the circuit for the weekend with 419,144 attending it, making it the most attended sporting event ever in Melbourne until it was broken the following year.

== Background ==
In October 2021, the Grand Prix was officially confirmed as the third of twenty-three races of the 2022 season at a FIA World Motor Sport Council meeting in Paris. The race took place at the fourteen-turn, 5.278 km (3.280 mi) Albert Park Circuit in Melbourne on 10 April 2022.

Prior to the weekend, drivers were reminded by one of the two race directors, Eduardo Freitas, who was not appointed for this Grand Prix, that they are prohibited by the FIA's International Sporting Code from wearing jewellery when inside their cars, as it could cause safety issues, particularly if there is a fire when drivers are trying to extract themselves from their cars. This reminder came after drivers were spotted wearing jewellery more frequently during recent Grand Prix weekends. Potential breaches of the rules in this regard could result in fines.

=== Circuit redevelopment ===
The circuit underwent several significant revisions in the months before the Grand Prix, which were the first and most significant changes since the inaugural 1996 Australian Grand Prix, including the first track resurfacing since then. Drivers were consulted on the planned changes. Turns 9 and 10 were completely redesigned; where they formed a right–left chicane with a heavy braking zone on the approach, the redesign saw them become a much faster right–left combination. This was done to raise the approach speed for turns 11 and 12. Several other corners were reprofiled to encourage overtaking, most notably turn 13, which was widened to create additional racing lines. Positive camber was also added to allow drivers to carry more speed through the corner. The main straight and pit lane were also redesigned, with the pit lane wall moved two metres closer to the circuit so that the edge of the circuit sat directly next to the wall.

The pit-lane change was made in response to then-Renault driver Daniel Ricciardo's opening-lap accident in 2019. Ricciardo ran wide at the start, crossing onto the grassy verge and hitting an unsighted culvert, which destroyed his front wing and the undertray of the car, forcing him to retire. As a result of the changes, race organisers applied to the FIA to raise the pit lane speed limit from 60 km/h (37.28 mph) to 80 km/h (49.71 mph). Such a change was significant, as the Formula One pits sit next to the support paddock and a pit stop would take less of a time penalty for drivers. These changes had originally been planned to be made after the race; however, the postponement allowed event organisers to make the changes in advance of the race. Further changes, such as resurfacing the circuit with a tarmac compound designed to wear tyres out, were planned to take place after the 2021 edition, which was postponed from March to November, before being cancelled and done later for the 2022 event. In addition, a fourth DRS zone was added to the redesigned track, before being removed for safety reasons ahead of the third practice session, after Alpine's Fernando Alonso in particular, who gained from its removal, complained about potential safety issues during the Saturday's drivers' briefing. Red Bull Racing was the sole team opposing the removal, having an efficient DRS system. The removal of the drag reduction system zone appeared to benefit those teams, such as Alpine and McLaren, who had minimised the aerodynamic porpoising of their cars.

=== Championship standings before the race ===
Charles Leclerc was the Drivers' Championship leader after the previous weekend's second round, with twelve points separating him from his teammate Carlos Sainz Jr. and 20 points from Max Verstappen. In the Constructors' Championship, Ferrari led Mercedes by 40 points and Red Bull by a further one.

=== Entrants ===
The drivers and teams were the same as the season entry list with no additional stand-in drivers for the race. Aston Martin's Sebastian Vettel, who was replaced by Nico Hülkenberg in the first two races due to coronavirus, made his season debut. Hülkenberg would not return to drive until the 2023 Bahrain Grand Prix.

=== Tyre choices ===
Tyre supplier Pirelli brought the C2, C3, and C5 tyre compounds (designated hard, medium, and soft, respectively) for teams to use at the event. It was the first event since the 2018 Russian Grand Prix that non-consecutive tyres were used.

=== Penalties ===
Williams's Alexander Albon carried a three-place grid penalty following a collision with Aston Martin's Lance Stroll at the previous round, the Saudi Arabian Grand Prix. However, he was disqualified from qualifying.

== Practice ==
There were three practice sessions for the Grand Prix. The first two took place on Friday 8 April at 13:00 and 16:00 local time (UTC+10:00). Ferrari's Carlos Sainz Jr. set the fastest lap in the first session ahead of teammate Charles Leclerc and Red Bull's Sergio Pérez. Leclerc set the fastest lap in the second session ahead of Red Bull's Max Verstappen and Sainz. The third practice session took place at 13:00 local time on 9 April, in which McLaren's Lando Norris set the fastest lap ahead of Leclerc and Pérez. It was red flagged at one point, as both Aston Martin cars crashed.

== Qualifying ==
Qualifying took place at 16:00 local time on 9 April and lasted for one hour. Valtteri Bottas's streak of 103 consecutive Q3 appearances ended. Charles Leclerc set the fastest time for pole position ahead of Max Verstappen and Sergio Pérez. Leclerc's teammate Carlos Sainz Jr. was not initially able to set a lap in Q3, as Fernando Alonso's crash caused a red flag; he qualified 9th after an error at turn 10, and having problems with starting the car, which caused a compromised warm-up lap.

=== Qualifying classification ===
Pos.	No.	Driver	Constructor	Qualifying times			Final grid
Pos.	No.	Driver	Constructor	Q1	Q2	Q3	Final grid
1	16	(Monaco) Charles Leclerc	Ferrari	1:18.881	1:18.606	1:17.868	1
2	1	(Netherlands) Max Verstappen	Red Bull Racing-RBPT	1:18.580	1:18.611	1:18.154	2
3	11	(Mexico) Sergio Pérez	Red Bull Racing-RBPT	1:18.834	1:18.340	1:18.240	3
4	4	(United Kingdom) Lando Norris	McLaren-Mercedes	1:19.280	1:19.066	1:18.703	4
5	44	(United Kingdom) Lewis Hamilton	Mercedes	1:19.401	1:19.106	1:18.825	5
6	63	(United Kingdom) George Russell	Mercedes	1:19.405	1:19.076	1:18.933	6
7	3	(Australia) Daniel Ricciardo	McLaren-Mercedes	1:19.665	1:19.130	1:19.032	7
8	31	(France) Esteban Ocon	Alpine-Renault	1:19.605	1:19.136	1:19.061	8
9	55	(Spain) Carlos Sainz Jr.	Ferrari	1:18.983	1:18.469	1:19.408	9
10	14	(Spain) Fernando Alonso	Alpine-Renault	1:19.192	1:18.815	No time	10
11	10	(France) Pierre Gasly	AlphaTauri-RBPT	1:19.580	1:19.226	N/A	11
12	77	(Finland) Valtteri Bottas	Alfa Romeo-Ferrari	1:19.251	1:19.410	N/A	12
13	22	(Japan) Yuki Tsunoda	AlphaTauri-RBPT	1:19.742	1:19.424	N/A	13
14	24	(China) Zhou Guanyu	Alfa Romeo-Ferrari	1:19.910	1:20.155	N/A	14
15	47	(Germany) Mick Schumacher	Haas-Ferrari	1:20.104	1:20.465	N/A	15
16	20	(Denmark) Kevin Magnussen	Haas-Ferrari	1:20.254	N/A	N/A	16
17	5	(Germany) Sebastian Vettel	Aston Martin Aramco-Mercedes	1:21.149	N/A	N/A	17
18	6	(Canada) Nicholas Latifi	Williams-Mercedes	1:21.372	N/A	N/A	18
DSQ	23	(Thailand) Alexander Albon	Williams-Mercedes	1:20.135	N/A	N/A	20^{1}
107% time: 1:24.080
—	18	(Canada) Lance Stroll	Aston Martin Aramco-Mercedes	No time	N/A	N/A	19^{2}

Notes

- ^1 – Alexander Albon qualified 16th, but he was disqualified because the required one-litre fuel sample could not be extracted from his car during post-qualifying scrutineering. He was permitted to race at the stewards' discretion. He also received a three-place grid penalty for causing a collision with Stroll at the previous round. The penalty made no difference as he was already disqualified.
- ^2 – Lance Stroll failed to set a time during qualifying due to a collision with Nicholas Latifi. He was permitted to race at the stewards' discretion. He also received a three-place grid penalty for causing the collision with Latifi. He gained a grid position following Albon's disqualification.

== Race ==
The race took place at 15:00 local time on 10 April and lasted 58 laps. Pole-sitter Charles Leclerc won the race, set the fastest lap for an additional point, and led every lap (grand slam), ahead of Sergio Pérez and George Russell. Russell got his second career podium after his second place at the 2021 Belgian Grand Prix.

=== Race report ===
The day before the race, Niels Wittich, one of the two race directors appointed for the Grand Prix, reminded drivers of a new safety car rule stating that a driver must stay behind the car ahead during restarts and not by the side, as Max Verstappen did at both the 2021 Abu Dhabi Grand Prix and the Saudi Arabian Grand Prix. Before the race, Red Bull made several changes to Verstappen's car without penalty, as did Nicholas Latifi, who was forced to change several gearbox elements due to his crash with Lance Stroll during qualifying, and Carlos Sainz Jr. had his wheel changed. Sainz had anti-stall issues at the start, and dropped to 14th by lap 2; in an attempt to make a comeback, the hard-tyred Sainz spun off at turn 10 trying to pass Mick Schumacher, causing his retirement, which brought out the safety car. After a brief struggle with keeping the tyres warm at the restart, Leclerc maintained the lead ahead of Verstappen, while Pérez, who was overtaken by Lewis Hamilton at the start, retook third position through DRS at turn 3 by lap 10. During the safety-car period, the hard-tyred Stroll pitted twice, first to change tyres to medium sets (as the regulations state drivers must use two tyre compounds) and then for the hardest compound in an attempt to finish the race without having to pit again.

On lap 24, an accident for Sebastian Vettel brought out the safety car. Russell, who had not yet pitted unlike most of the grid, used the opportunity to make a pit stop, gaining time over his competitors due to pitting under safety car and rejoining the race in third behind Leclerc, who had built a lead and had pitted before the safety car, and Verstappen, who locked up at turn 11 on lap 12 and suffered graining on his left-front tyre. With the safety car still on the track on lap 25, Schumacher almost hit Yuki Tsunoda, leading stewards to review the safety-car protocol to mandate the 10-length gap between vehicles behind the safety car. When racing resumed on lap 27, Verstappen attempted to overtake Leclerc, who picked up old rubber on turn 16, but Leclerc held position into turn 1 and built another lead. Pérez came out fifth after the safety car but was back in third by lap 37, after a brief battle for third with Russell, who was told to look after his tyres and to not fight Pérez. On lap 39, Verstappen retired due to a fuel issue causing a fire in his car, his last retirement until coincidentally the 2024 edition of the race, which was different from that in Bahrain. The virtual safety car was brought out, ending on lap 40. In the final laps, Hamilton was closing in on teammate Russell for third but could not race him due to overheating. Alexander Albon was able to keep his hard compounds for 57 laps, before having to make his compulsory pit stop, and finished 10th for Williams's first point of the season. On lap 58, Leclerc set the fastest lap, as he won the race, while Pérez and Russell completed the podium.

The results moved Russell into second place in the Drivers' Championship, while Leclerc extended his lead to 34 points, and 46 points ahead of Verstappen, who suffered his second DNF in three races. Verstappen would go on to win the championship, breaking the record for the largest points deficit overturned in a season. Leclerc's grand slam was the first for a Ferrari driver since Fernando Alonso had achieved the feat at the 2010 Singapore Grand Prix, and his performance was compared to Michael Schumacher's grand slam at the 2004 Australian Grand Prix.

=== Race classification ===
Pos.	No.	Driver	Constructor	Laps	Time/Retired	Grid	Points
1	16	(Monaco) Charles Leclerc	Ferrari	58	1:27:46.548	1	26^{1}
2	11	(Mexico) Sergio Pérez	Red Bull Racing-RBPT	58	+20.524	3	18
3	63	(United Kingdom) George Russell	Mercedes	58	+25.593	6	15
4	44	(United Kingdom) Lewis Hamilton	Mercedes	58	+28.543	5	12
5	4	(United Kingdom) Lando Norris	McLaren-Mercedes	58	+53.303	4	10
6	3	(Australia) Daniel Ricciardo	McLaren-Mercedes	58	+53.737	7	8
7	31	(France) Esteban Ocon	Alpine-Renault	58	+1:01.683	8	6
8	77	(Finland) Valtteri Bottas	Alfa Romeo-Ferrari	58	+1:08.439	12	4
9	10	(France) Pierre Gasly	AlphaTauri-RBPT	58	+1:16.221	11	2
10	23	(Thailand) Alexander Albon	Williams-Mercedes	58	+1:19.382	20	1
11	24	(China) Zhou Guanyu	Alfa Romeo-Ferrari	58	+1:21.695	14	
12	18	(Canada) Lance Stroll	Aston Martin Aramco-Mercedes	58	+1:28.598^{2}	19	
13	47	(Germany) Mick Schumacher	Haas-Ferrari	57	+1 lap	15	
14	20	(Denmark) Kevin Magnussen	Haas-Ferrari	57	+1 lap	16	
15	22	(Japan) Yuki Tsunoda	AlphaTauri-RBPT	57	+1 lap	13	
16	6	(Canada) Nicholas Latifi	Williams-Mercedes	57	+1 lap	18	
17	14	(Spain) Fernando Alonso	Alpine-Renault	57	+1 lap	10	
Ret	1	(Netherlands) Max Verstappen	Red Bull Racing-RBPT	38	Fuel leak	2	
Ret	5	(Germany) Sebastian Vettel	Aston Martin Aramco-Mercedes	22	Accident	17	
Ret	55	(Spain) Carlos Sainz Jr.	Ferrari	1	Spun off	9	
Fastest lap: (Monaco) Charles Leclerc (Ferrari) – 1:20.260 (lap 58)

Notes

- ^1 – Includes one point for fastest lap.
- ^2 – Lance Stroll received a five-second time penalty for weaving on the straight.

== Championship standings after the race ==
Drivers' Championship standings

	Pos.	Driver	Points
	1	(Monaco) Charles Leclerc	71
2	2	(United Kingdom) George Russell	37
1	3	(Spain) Carlos Sainz Jr.	33
3	4	(Mexico) Sergio Pérez	30
	5	(United Kingdom) Lewis Hamilton	28

Constructors' Championship standings

	Pos.	Constructor	Points
	1	(Italy) Ferrari	104
	2	(Germany) Mercedes	65
	3	(Austria) Red Bull Racing-RBPT	55
4	4	(United Kingdom) McLaren-Mercedes	24
1	5	(France) Alpine-Renault	22

- Note: Only the top five positions are included for both sets of standings.

== See also ==
- 2022 Melbourne 400

== Notes ==
Previous race: 2022 Saudi Arabian Grand Prix	FIA Formula One World Championship; 2022 season	Next race: 2022 Emilia Romagna Grand Prix
Previous race: 2019 Australian Grand Prix; 2020 edition cancelled	Australian Grand Prix	Next race: 2023 Australian Grand Prix
