= Sportswashing in Saudi Arabia =

Use of sports to promote Saudi Arabia

Sportswashing refers to the practice of using sports to improve a country's or organization's reputation, often to distract from human rights concerns, political controversies, or other negative aspects of its governance. It involves hosting major sporting events, investing in prominent teams, or sponsoring high-profile competitions to project a more favorable global image.

Saudi Arabia has been widely accused of sportswashing as part of its broader Vision 2030 initiative, which aims to diversify its economy and enhance its global influence. The country has made significant investments in sports to reshape its international image, particularly in light of criticism over its human rights record, including restrictions on free speech, the treatment of women, and the 2018 killing of journalist Jamal Khashoggi.

== History ==
=== Early engagements ===
The foundation for Saudi Arabia's involvement in international sports was laid in 1971 with the establishment of the Public Investment Fund (PIF) by King Faisal bin Abdulaziz Al Saud. Initially aimed at fostering companies vital to the Saudi economy, the PIF later became instrumental in financing major sports ventures.

In 1977, the Saudi state-owned airline, Saudia, sponsored the Williams Formula One team, leading to the team's rebranding as Saudia-Williams; a partnership that lasted until 1984. This marked one of the kingdom's first significant forays into international sports sponsorship.

=== Expansion into global sports ===
The 2010s witnessed a strategic acceleration in Saudi Arabia's sports investments, aligning with the Vision 2030 initiative; a comprehensive plan to diversify the nation's economy away from oil dependency. This period saw the kingdom hosting high-profile events and forming partnerships with major sports organizations.

In 2014, Saudi Arabia began hosting World Wrestling Entertainment (WWE) events, including the annual Crown Jewel, bringing international attention to the kingdom.

The acquisition of Newcastle United Football Club in 2021 by a consortium led by the PIF for over £300 million exemplified Saudi Arabia's intent to establish a presence in European football. This move was part of a broader pattern of investing in prominent sports entities to bolster the kingdom's international profile.

By 2023, Saudi Arabia had intensified its sports investments, exemplified by hosting the Saudi Arabian Grand Prix and securing significant boxing matches, further embedding itself in the global sports arena.

=== Recent developments ===
In December 2024, FIFA announced Saudi Arabia as the host of the 2034 Men's World Cup, a decision that underscored the kingdom's successful bid to become a central figure in international football. This move, however, attracted criticism due to concerns over the country's human rights record and allegations of using sports to divert attention from domestic issues.

Critics argue that these extensive investments serve to "sportswash" Saudi Arabia's human rights violations, including the suppression of dissent and gender inequality. Human Rights Watch has highlighted the kingdom's use of high-profile sports events to launder its reputation internationally.

== Initiatives by sport ==
=== Football ===
Saudi Arabia has strategically leveraged football to enhance its international profile, engaging in significant investments and hosting major events.

- The Supercopa de España held football matches in Saudi Arabia:
  - 2019–2020 Supercopa de España held in Jeddah, Saudi Arabia
  - 2021–2022 Supercopa de España held in Jeddah, Saudi Arabia
  - 2022–2023 Supercopa de España, 2023–24 Supercopa de España, 2025 Supercopa de España and 2026 Supercopa de España, all held in Riyadh, Saudi Arabia

==== Acquisition of Newcastle United ====
In October 2021, an investment group led by Saudi Arabia's Public Investment Fund (PIF) acquired a 100% stake in Newcastle United Football Club. The consortium included PCP Capital Partners and RB Sports & Media. This acquisition was part of Saudi Arabia's broader strategy to invest in global sports assets.

By July 2024, PIF increased its stake in Newcastle United to 85%, further consolidating its control over the club.

==== Investments in the Saudi Pro League ====
The Saudi Pro League has attracted international attention through the acquisition of high-profile players. Notable transfers include:

- Cristiano Ronaldo (Al Nassr)
- Karim Benzema (Al-Ittihad)
- Riyad Mahrez (Al-Ahli)
- Sadio Mane (Al Nassr)
- Kalidou Koulibaly (Al Hilal)

In early 2025, the league shifted its focus towards acquiring younger talents, exemplified by the signing of Jhon Durán from Aston Villa for $79 million and Kaio César from Vitória Guimarães for $9.25 million. This strategy aims to build a sustainable and competitive league by nurturing emerging stars.

==== Hosting international tournaments ====
Saudi Arabia hosted the 2023 FIFA Club World Cup from 12 to 22 December in Jeddah. The tournament featured seven teams, with Manchester City emerging as champions. This event marked Saudi Arabia's inaugural hosting of the Club World Cup, aligning with its vision to become a hub for major international sports events.

Furthermore, Saudi Arabia has been confirmed as the host for the 2034 FIFA World Cup.

=== Motorsport ===
==== Formula One ====
In 2021, Saudi Arabia hosted its inaugural Formula One Grand Prix on the streets of Jeddah. This event was part of a long-term agreement between F1 and the kingdom, reflecting Saudi Arabia's ambition to become a central hub for international sporting events. However, human rights organizations criticized the move, accusing the kingdom of using the glamour of F1 to distract from its human rights issues; a practice often referred to as "sportswashing." Human rights groups characterized the event as "a blatant attempt at sportswashing to legitimise the country's repressive regime."

In 2020, Saudi Aramco, the kingdom's state-owned oil company, entered into a long-term global sponsorship agreement with Formula One. This partnership included Aramco branding on F1 circuits, digital platforms, and race broadcasts. The deal was reportedly valued between $42 million and $51 million per year over a ten-year period.

==== Dakar Rally ====
Since 2020, Saudi Arabia has been the host of the Dakar Rally, one of the most grueling and renowned off-road endurance events globally. The decision to relocate the rally to Saudi Arabia has been met with significant opposition from human rights organizations such as The European Convention on Human Rights (ECDHR). They contend that the kingdom is leveraging the event to divert attention from its human rights violations.

In 2025, Saudi driver Yazeed Al-Rajhi made history by becoming the first Saudi to win the Dakar Rally, a milestone that was celebrated nationally. While this achievement highlighted the growing prominence of motorsports within the country, it also brought renewed focus to ongoing motorsport debates surrounding sportswashing.

=== Golf ===
==== Establishment and expansion of LIV Golf ====
In 2022, Saudi Arabia's Public Investment Fund (PIF) launched LIV Golf, a professional golf tour that attracted several top players from the PGA Tour with lucrative contracts. This move was widely viewed as an attempt to "sportswash" the kingdom's human rights record by diverting attention through high-profile golfing events.

==== Merger with the PGA Tour ====
In June 2023, the PGA Tour announced a merger with LIV Golf, effectively bringing Saudi Arabia's PIF into a position of significant influence within professional golf. This merger was criticised by human rights organisations, including Amnesty International, which described it as further evidence of Saudi Arabia's efforts to "sportswash" its human rights abuses.

=== Boxing ===
==== Hosting high-profile boxing matches ====
The kingdom has hosted several notable boxing matches, attracting global attention:

- Anthony Joshua vs. Andy Ruiz Jr. II (2019): Dubbed the "Clash on the Dunes", this rematch took place in Diriyah, marking Saudi Arabia's first major foray into hosting international boxing events.
- Tyson Fury vs. Francis Ngannou (2023): This crossover bout between the WBC heavyweight champion and the former UFC heavyweight champion was held in Riyadh.

==== Strategic partnerships ====
In March 2025, TKO Group Holdings, the parent company of UFC and WWE, announced a partnership with Saudi Arabia's General Entertainment Authority and Sela, a subsidiary of the Public Investment Fund, to launch a new boxing promotion. This initiative, led by UFC President Dana White and WWE President Nick Khan, aims to revitalize the sport by organizing high-profile events, with the first card expected in 2026.

== See also ==
- Sportswashing
- Saudi Vision 2030
- Human rights in Saudi Arabia
- Politics and sports
