= Jeddah Corniche Circuit =

Racing circuit in Saudi Arabia

- Grand Prix Circuit (2021–present)

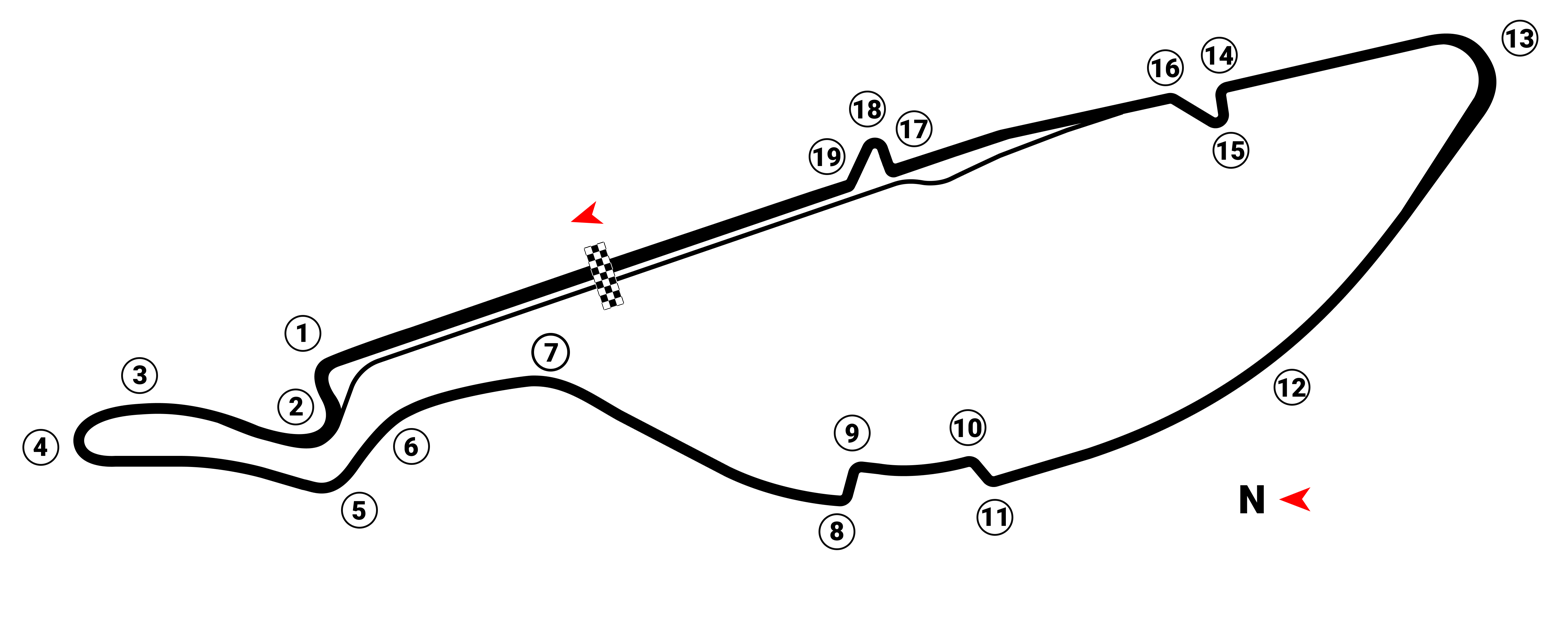
- Formula E Circuit (2025–present)
- Location: Jeddah, Saudi Arabia
- Coordinates: 21°37′55″N 39°6′16″E
- Capacity: 50,000
- FIA Grade: 1 (Grand Prix); 3E (Formula E)
- Broke ground: March 2021; 5 years ago
- Opened: 3 December 2021; 4 years ago
- Architect: Carsten Tilke
- Major events: Current: Formula E Jeddah ePrix (2025–present); Future: Formula One; Saudi Arabian Grand Prix (2021–2025, 2027); Former: GT World Challenge Europe; 6 Hours of Jeddah (2024); WTCR; Race of Saudi Arabia (2022)
- Website: jeddahcircuit.com

Grand Prix Circuit (2021–present)
- Surface: Asphalt
- Length: 6.174 km (3.836 mi)
- Turns: 27
- Race lap record: 1:30.734 ( (United Kingdom) Lewis Hamilton, Mercedes W12, 2021, F1)

Formula E Circuit (2025–present)
- Length: 3.001 km (1.865 mi)
- Turns: 19
- Race lap record: 1:15.653 ( (United Kingdom) Jake Dennis, Porsche 99X Electric, 2026, F-E)

Short Circuit (2022–present)
- Length: 3.450 km (2.144 mi)
- Turns: 12
- Race lap record: 1:16.986 ( (Belgium) Gilles Magnus, Audi RS 3 LMS TCR, 2022, TCR)

The Jeddah Corniche Circuit (Arabic: حلبة كورنيش جدة) is a motor racing street circuit in Jeddah, Saudi Arabia. It currently hosts the Formula One Saudi Arabian Grand Prix since 2021, and the Formula E Jeddah ePrix since 2025. The circuit is located on the Jeddah Corniche adjoining the Red Sea.

== History ==
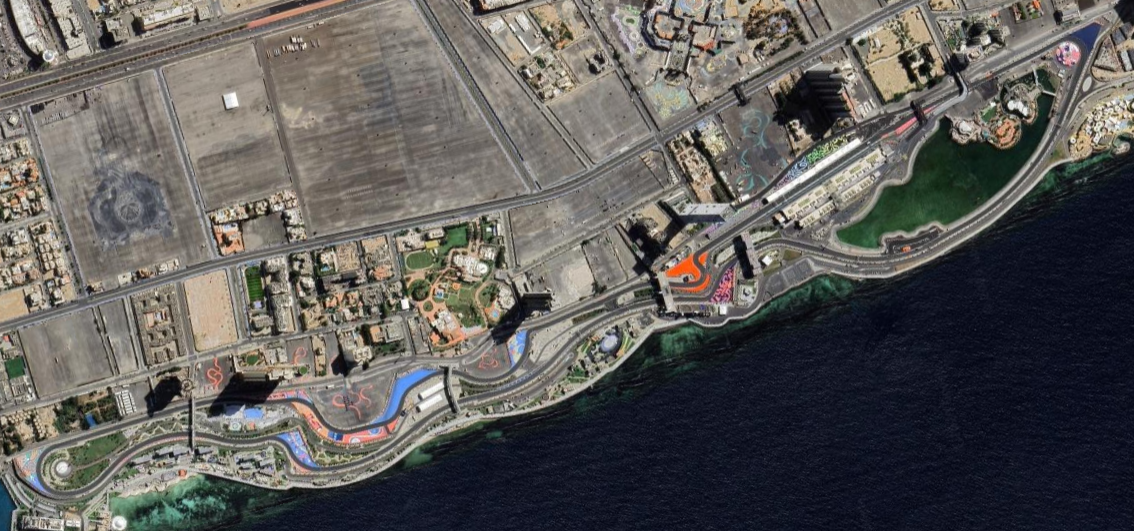
Satellite view of the circuit as it appeared in 2025

The circuit was designed by Carsten Tilke, son of the famed circuit designer, Hermann Tilke. The circuit staged the inaugural Saudi Arabian Grand Prix on 5 December 2021 as the penultimate race on the 2021 Formula One season calendar. From 2022 to 2024, the race was held in March, the weekend before Ramadan. Since 2025, the race is held in April, after Ramadan.

The Formula One track has a length of 6.174 km (3.836 mi), the third longest on the Formula One calendar after Spa-Francorchamps and Las Vegas. It is also the fastest street course, with a record average speed of 254.6 km/h (158.2 mph) for the 2025 pole position. The track has three consecutive DRS zones.

In November 2022, Jeddah Corniche Circuit hosted the season finale of 2022 World Touring Car Cup. Instead of the Grand Prix layout, a shorter 3.450 km (2.144 mi) layout was configured for that race.

Also in February 2025, Jeddah Corniche Circuit hosted the Saudi Arabian round of the Formula E championship instead of Riyadh Street Circuit. A different layout was built for the Formula E race, in which the circuit length was shortened to 3.001 km (1.865 mi), with the addition of a hairpin connecting turn 3 to turn 22 on the Formula One layout, and some chicanes on the front and back straightaways.

== Events ==
Current

- February: Formula E Jeddah ePrix
- October: F4 Saudi Arabian Championship
- November: F4 Saudi Arabian Championship

Future

- Ferrari Challenge Middle East (2027)
- F1 Academy (2024–2025, 2027)
- FIA Formula 2 Championship
  - Jeddah Formula 2 round (2021–2025, 2027)
- FIA Formula 3 Championship (2027)
- Formula One Saudi Arabian Grand Prix (2021–2025, 2027)

Former

- GT4 European Series (2024)
- GT World Challenge Europe
  - 6 Hours of Jeddah (2024)
- Porsche Carrera Cup Middle East (2021–2025)
- World Touring Car Cup
  - FIA WTCR Race of Saudi Arabia (2022)

== Lap records ==
As of February 2026, the fastest official race lap records at the Jeddah Corniche Circuit are listed as:

| Category | Time | Driver | Vehicle | Event |
Grand Prix Circuit (2021–present): 6.174 km (3.836 mi)
| Formula One | 1:30.734 | Lewis Hamilton | Mercedes-AMG F1 W12 E Performance | 2021 Saudi Arabian Grand Prix |
| FIA F2 | 1:43.098 | Jack Doohan | Dallara F2 2018 | 2022 Jeddah Formula 2 round |
| GT3 | 1:59.772 | Franck Perera | Lamborghini Huracán GT3 Evo 2 | 2024 6 Hours of Jeddah |
| Porsche Carrera Cup | 2:03.645 | Bandar Alesayi | Porsche 911 (992 I) GT3 Cup | 2022 Jeddah Porsche Sprint Challenge Middle East round |
| Formula 4 | 2:04.259 | Doriane Pin | Tatuus F4-T421 | 2024 Jeddah F1 Academy round |
| GT4 | 2:09.820 | Freddy Fast | Porsche 718 Cayman GT4 Clubsport | 2022 Jeddah Porsche Sprint Challenge Middle East round |
Formula E Circuit (2025–present): 3.001 km (1.865 mi)
| Formula E | 1:15.653 | Jake Dennis | Porsche 99X Electric | 2026 Jeddah ePrix (February) |
Short Circuit (2022–present): 3.450 km (2.144 mi)
| TCR Touring Car | 1:16.986 | Gilles Magnus | Audi RS 3 LMS TCR (2021) | 2022 WTCR Race of Saudi Arabia |
