= Saudi Arabia 2034 FIFA World Cup bid =

Football World Cup host nation bid

- ملف السعودية 2034
- Bid logo

Location
- Country: Saudi Arabia
- Cities/towns: 5
- Proposed stadiums: 15

Sport information
- Sport: Football
- Tournament: 2034 FIFA World Cup

History
- Launched: 2024

The Saudi Arabia 2034 bid is a bid by the Saudi Arabian Football Federation to host the 2034 FIFA World Cup in Saudi Arabia.

After Saudi Arabia abandoned its 2030 bid alongside Greece and Egypt, the oil-rich monarchy switched its focus to a solo 2034 bid. Similar strategies to the 2022 FIFA World Cup in Qatar, which was held in November–December as opposed to the usual summer scheduling, may be used to mitigate the country's summer heat, though the Saudi FA have insisted on a plan to host in the summer. The country's bid was announced on 4 October 2023. On 5 October, AFC President Salman bin Ibrahim Al Khalifa backed Saudi Arabia's bid. On the 9th, Saudi Arabia announced that it had submitted the official letter of intent, and signed the declaration to FIFA to bid to host the 2034 FIFA World Cup, and that over 70 different member associations had already pledged their support for its bid. It was ratified by the FIFA Congress on 11 December 2024.

== Background ==
Crown Prince Mohammed bin Salman announced his intent to bid within minutes of FIFA announcing the bidding timeline, which was followed by the backing of Asian football leaders within the next hours. After Australia's decision to not bid for the 2034 World Cup, Saudi Arabia became the sole bidder to host the tournament.

Saudi Arabia will be the first country to host the World Cup alone in its 64-team format since it was expanded from 32 teams starting with the 2026 FIFA World Cup (which was co-hosted by the United States, Canada, and Mexico)., and from 48 with the 2030 FIFA World Cup.

On 30 November 2024, FIFA released its evaluation report of Saudi Arabia's bid. According to the report, Saudi Arabia was awarded an average score of 4.2 out 5, the highest in history.

== Major sports events hosting experiences ==
- 1986 AFC Youth Championship
- 1989 FIFA World Youth Championship
- 1992 AFC U-16 Championship
- 1992 King Fahd Cup
- 1995 King Fahd Cup
- 1997 FIFA Confederations Cup
- 2023 FIFA Club World Cup
- 2024 FIFA Series (2/6 groups) in Jeddah
- 2026 Asian Indoor and Martial Arts Games in Riyadh
- 2027 AFC Asian Cup
- 2034 Asian Games in Riyadh

== Proposed venues ==
Location of the cities proposed in the bid.
1 Riyadh
2 Jeddah
3 Al Khobar
4 Neom
5 Abha

The official list of the proposed stadiums was confirmed on 31 July 2024. The tournament is planned to be held in five cities: Riyadh, Jeddah, Al Khobar, NEOM and Abha, with a total of 15 stadiums (11 of which will be new). The King Salman International Stadium in Riyadh could host the opening game and final.

List of cities and stadiums proposed for the tournament
City	Stadium	Capacity
Riyadh	King Salman International Stadium	92,760 (new)
Riyadh	King Fahad Sports City Stadium	70,200 (after renovation)
Riyadh	South Riyadh Stadium	47,060 (new)
Riyadh	Prince Mohammed bin Salman Stadium	46,979 (new)
Riyadh	Prince Faisal bin Fahad Sports City Stadium	46,865 (after renovation)
Riyadh	King Saud University Stadium	46,319 (after renovation)
Riyadh	New Murabba Stadium	46,010 (new)
Riyadh	ROSHN Stadium	46,000 (new)
Jeddah	King Abdullah Sports City Stadium	62,345 (after renovation)
Jeddah	Qiddiya Coast Stadium	46,096 (new)
Jeddah	Jeddah Central Development Stadium	45,794 (new)
Jeddah	King Abdullah Economic City Stadium	45,700 (new)
Al Khobar	Aramco Stadium	46,096 (new)
Neom	NEOM Stadium	46,010 (new)
Abha	King Khalid University Stadium	45,428 (after renovation)

== Support ==
=== Football confederations ===
- Asian Football Confederation
