= Sirocco Tower =

Drop tower at Six Flags Qiddiya City, Saudi Arabia

Six Flags Qiddiya City
- Area: City Of Thrills
- Coordinates: 24.588000°N 46.333130°E
- Status: Operating
- Opening date: December 31, 2025

Ride statistics
- Attraction type: Drop tower
- Manufacturer: S&S – Sansei Technologies
- Model: Space Shot
- Height: 475 ft (145 m)
- Vehicle type: Gondola
- Vehicles: 4
- Riders per vehicle: 8
- Height restriction: 130–205 cm (4 ft 3 in – 6 ft 9 in)

Sirocco Tower (Note: Arabic: برج سيروكو (romanized: Burj Sīrūkū)) is a drop tower located at Six Flags Qiddiya City in Qiddiya City, Riyadh Province, Saudi Arabia. The ride has held the world record for tallest freestanding drop tower since its opening on December 31, 2025.

== History ==
On April 4, 2018, Six Flags Entertainment Corporation announced the development of a new park in Riyadh. Later, on August 26, 2019, the Qiddiya Investment Company unveiled plans for the 79-acre park's design. Among the rides announced were Falcons Flight, the world's tallest, fastest, and longest roller coaster, as well as Sirocco Tower, the world's tallest freestanding drop tower. The park opened on December 31, 2025.
