= ROSHN Stadium =

Planned stadium in Riyadh, Saudi Arabia

- Planned design of the stadium
- Interactive map of ROSHN Stadium
- Location: Riyadh, Saudi Arabia
- Coordinates: 24.45710985917817°N 46.609657152342535°E
- Owner: ROSHN Group
- Operator: ROSHN Group
- Capacity: 46,000
- Surface: Hybrid grass
- Field size: Field of play: 105 m × 68 m Pitch area: 125 m × 85 m

Construction
- Groundbreaking: 2028; 2 years' time (planned)
- Opened: 2032; 6 years' time (planned)
- Builder: ROSHN Group

Tenants
- TBA: Major sporting events hosted; 2034 FIFA World Cup (planned)

ROSHN Stadium (Note: Arabic: ملعب روشن (romanized: Malʿab Rūshn)) was a planned multi-purpose stadium located in south-west Riyadh, Saudi Arabia. The stadium will be owned and operated by the Saudi real estate development group ROSHN.

It was set to be a venue for the 2034 FIFA World Cup and had a proposed capacity of 46,000 people, where it will host fixtures in the group stage and round of 32.

== See also ==
- List of football stadiums in Saudi Arabia
