= King Abdullah Economic City Stadium =

Planned multi-purpose stadium in King Abdullah Economic City, Saudi Arabia

King Abdullah Economic City Stadium ملعب مدينة الملك عبدالله الاقتصادية
- Planned design of the stadium
- Interactive map of King Abdullah Economic City Stadium ملعب مدينة الملك عبدالله الاقتصادية
- Location: King Abdullah Economic City, Rabigh, Saudi Arabia
- Coordinates: 22.412°N 39.186°E
- Owner: Ministry of Sport
- Operator: Ministry of Sport
- Capacity: 45,700
- Surface: Hybrid grass
- Field size: Field of play: 105m × 68m Pitch area: 125m × 85m

Construction
- Groundbreaking: 2027; 1 year's time (planned)
- Opened: 2032; 6 years' time (planned)
- Architect: AFL Architects

Tenant
- 2034 FIFA World Cup (planned)

King Abdullah Economic City Stadium (Arabic: ملعب مدينة الملك عبد الله الاقتصادية, romanized: maleabʿ madinat al-malik abd-allāh al-aiqtisadia) was a planned multi-purpose stadium in King Abdullah Economic City, Rabigh, Saudi Arabia on the Red Sea coast north of Jeddah. It was set to be a venue for the 2034 FIFA World Cup and has a proposed capacity of 45,700 people, where it would host fixtures in the group stage and round of 32.

== Overview ==
King Abdullah Economic City is a planned city in Rabigh Governorate, Mecca Province, Saudi Arabia. It was announced as a megaproject in 2005 by King Abdullah, and the city — including its stadium — was named in his honor. It is located in close proximity to Thuwal, almost 100 km north of Jeddah.

== Description ==
=== Construction ===
Construction on the stadium was planned to begin in 2027 and with opening taking place in 2032. The primary architects hired to design the stadium were AFL Architects based in Manchester. AFL said the stadium would feature energy-efficient systems and green spaces as part of plans to prioritize the conservation of resources and the reduction of its ecological footprint.

Its innovative design and organic aesthetic take inspiration from the adaptive growth of local Red Sea coral reefs. Developed as a multifunctional hub, the stadium emphasizes economic prosperity, environmental sustainability, and community integration. Beyond the stadium itself, the precinct will feature additional facilities, including three hotels, mixed-use spaces, and a sports clinic. The surrounding area seamlessly blends the stadium with public spaces, incorporating parkland, retail units, and other amenities.

=== Post-2034 ===
After the World Cup, the main stadium was to primarily serve as a venue for football matches, concerts, and exhibitions. The surrounding precinct would focus on fostering community engagement, featuring extensive green spaces that provide residents with opportunities to connect with nature.

== See also ==
- List of things named after Saudi kings
- List of football stadiums in Saudi Arabia
