= NEOM Stadium =

Planned multi-purpose stadium in The Line, Neom, Saudi Arabia

- Planned design of stadium
- Interactive map of NEOM Stadium
- Location: The Line, Neom, Saudi Arabia
- Coordinates: 28.116443°N 35.103960°E
- Elevation: 350 m (1,150 ft)
- Owner: NEOM Company
- Operator: NEOM Company
- Capacity: 46,096
- Surface: Hybrid grass
- Field size: Field of play: 105m × 68m Pitch area: 125m × 85m

Construction
- Opened: 2032; 6 years' time (planned)
- Main contractor: Webuild

Tenants
- Neom SC & Neom SC (women) (planned)

NEOM Stadium (Arabic: ملعب نيوم, romanized: maleab nium) was a planned multi-purpose stadium located in The Line, Neom, Saudi Arabia. It was envisioned to be a venue for the 2034 FIFA World Cup and had a proposed capacity of 46,010 people. The project was cancelled in 2026.

== Description ==
=== Construction ===
Construction on the stadium was scheduled to begin in 2027 and end in 2032. Saudi planning authorities revealed only a few official details about the stadium, and some workers at firms associated with NEOM's construction expressed uncertainty that the project would be completed as planned.

Yasir Al-Rumayyan, governor of NEOM's owner the Public Investment Fund, announced in April 2026 that The Line was not vital before 2030, and though Reuters reported in October 2026, relying on two sources, that the NEOM Stadium, planned as a venue for the 2034 World Cup, had been shelved indefinitely, Al-Rumayyan denied that any projects had been cancelled.

NEOM Stadium was planned to be 350 metres (1,150 ft) above the ground and integrated into the roof of The Line. It was planned to incorporate new technologies and anchor a sports-focused neighborhood.

The announced plan placed the stadium in the Hidden Marina section of The Line, adjacent to the Health and Well-Being District and the University. A fully electric transportation system was planned for the venue.

=== Post-2034 ===
Before and after the World Cup, the stadium was planned to serve as the home to professional football clubs in The Line.

=== Human rights concerns ===
The construction of The Line has been met with substantial concern by human rights organizations. As NEOM Stadium is tightly associated with both construction of The Line and the 2034 FIFA World Cup bid, a range of human rights organizations, including Amnesty International and expert consultants at the United Nations Human Rights Council, have lodged complaints about human rights abuse in these projects. A 2024 documentary on conditions within the NEOM worksite revealed that the largely migrant workers are expected to work "way beyond what the international minimum standards permit".

== See also ==
- List of football stadiums in Saudi Arabia
