= Prince Faisal bin Fahd Sports City Stadium =

Stadium in Riyadh, Saudi Arabia

- Planned design of stadium
- Interactive map of Prince Faisal bin Fahd Sports City Stadium
- Address: من, Al Ameen Abdullah Al Ali Al Naeem St، طريق صلاح الدين الايوبي, Riyadh 12836, Saudi Arabia
- Location: Riyadh, Saudi Arabia
- Coordinates: 24.6626°N 46.7397°E
- Owner: Ministry of Sport
- Operator: Ministry of Sport
- Capacity: 22,188 (to be expanded to 44,500 for 2027 AFC Asian Cup)
- Surface: Grass

Construction
- Groundbreaking: 1969
- Opened: 1971
- Renovated: 2024; 2 years ago
- Reopened: 2027; 1 year's time (planned)
- Main contractor: Al-Qussie International Co.

Tenants
- Saudi Arabia national football team (1972–present); Al Hilal (1972–1987); Al Nassr (1972–2020); Al Shabab (1972–1984)

Prince Faisal bin Fahd Sports City Stadium (Arabic: ملعب مدينة الأمير فيصل بن فهد الرياضية, romanized: maleab madinat al'amir faysal bin fahd alriyadia) is a multi-purpose stadium in Riyadh, Saudi Arabia. It is set to be a venue for the 2034 FIFA World Cup and has a proposed capacity of 46,865 people following refurbishments, where it will host fixtures in the group stage and round of 32. It will also host matches for the 2027 AFC Asian Cup, specifically the group stage and round of 16. According to Saudi Arabia's bid for the World Cup, the current stadium will be demolished and a new one will be built nearby the old location under the same name.

It is currently used mostly for football matches and the stadium has a capacity of 22,188 people. Al-Hilal, Al Nassr and Al-Shabab used to play their matches in this stadium before getting privates stadiums. In 1972, it hosted the opening ceremony for the Arabian Gulf Cup. In the 2011–2012 it became one of the first stadiums in the Kingdom to use electronic ticketing for the Saudi Football League.

The stadium is named after former prince of Saudi Arabia, Prince Faisal bin Fahd bin Abdulaziz al-Saud.

== Description ==
=== Construction ===
The original stadium began construction in 1969 and was opened in 1971. The new site began construction in 2024 and its opening will take place in 2027.

As part of the Prince Faisal bin Fahd Sports City Stadium project, the venue will be the centerpiece of a broader park site master plan.

=== Post-2034 ===
Following the World Cup, the stadium is expected to serve as the home of a professional football club and primarily host major matches. Additionally, it will accommodate concerts, international events, and future sporting tournaments.

== International football matches ==
Date	Competition	Team	Res	Team
8 March 1981	Friendly	Saudi Arabia		Tunisia
10 September 2018	Friendly	Saudi Arabia	2–2	Bolivia
11 October 2018	Friendly	Iraq	0–4	Argentina
10 November 2019	Friendly	Saudi Arabia	0–0	Paraguay
5 June 2025	2026 FIFA World Cup qualification	North Korea	2–2	Kyrgyzstan

== See also ==
- List of football stadiums in Saudi Arabia
