= Prince Mohammed bin Salman Stadium =

Football stadium in Qiddiya, Saudi Arabia

- Architectural render of the stadium's planned design
- Interactive map of Prince Mohammed bin Salman Stadium
- Location: Qiddiya City, Riyadh Province, Saudi Arabia
- Coordinates: 24.585°N 46.342°E
- Owner: Qiddiya Investment Company
- Operator: Qiddiya Investment Company
- Capacity: 46,979
- Surface: Hybrid grass
- Field size: Field of play: 105m × 68m Pitch area: 125m × 85m

Construction
- Groundbreaking: December 12, 2024; 22 months ago
- Architect: Populous
- Builder: FCC Group
- Main contractors: Nesma & Partners

Tenants
- Al-Nassr (Planned); Al-Hilal (Planned)

Website
- Official website

The Prince Mohammed bin Salman Stadium (Note: Arabic: ملعب الأمير محمد بن سلمان (romanized: Malʿab al-Amīr Muḥammad bin Salmān), also known as Qiddiya Stadium) is an under construction multi-purpose stadium located in Qiddiya City, Riyadh Province, Saudi Arabia. It is set to be a venue for the 2034 FIFA World Cup and has a proposed capacity of 46,979 seats.

== Overview ==
The stadium, named after Saudi Crown Prince and Prime Minister Mohammed bin Salman, was announced on January 15, 2024. Construction began later that year, with the official groundbreaking taking place on December 12, 2024.

Situated within the Qiddiya City development, the stadium features a three-sided bowl that overlooks the Tuwaiq cliffs. Its "futuristic" design incorporates iridescent and LED glass, integrated screens, solar panels, and perforated metal. The venue is expected to become the world's first fully integrated stadium to combine a retractable roof, pitch and LED wall.

Once completed, the stadium is due to host matches for the 2034 FIFA World Cup and serve as the home ground for Saudi Pro League clubs Al-Nassr and Al-Hilal.

== See also ==
- List of football stadiums in Saudi Arabia
