= Six Flags Qiddiya City =

Amusement park in Qiddiya City, Saudi Arabia

Six Flags Qiddiya City ستة أعلام مدينة القدية
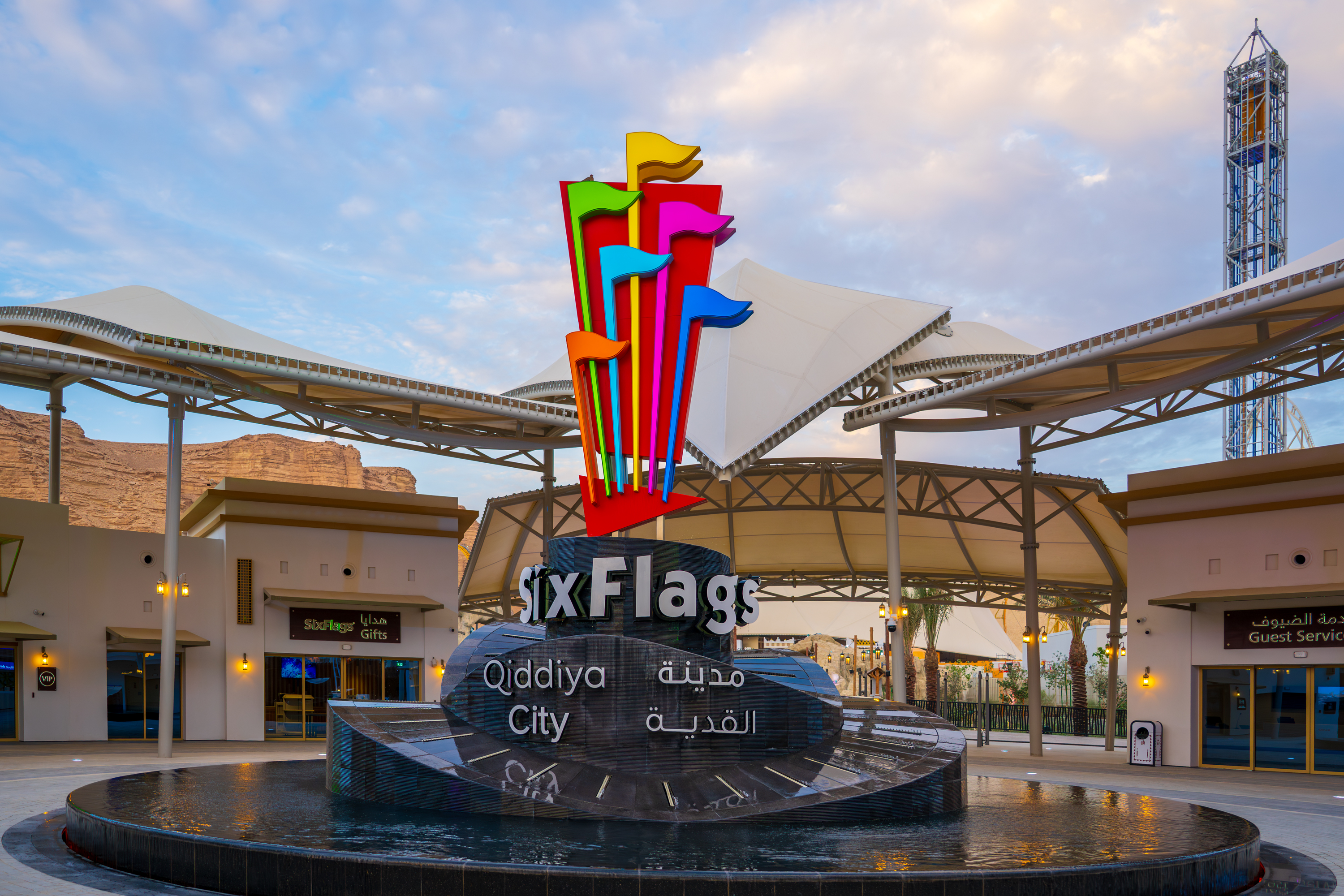
- Location in Qiddiya
- Location: Qiddiya City, Riyadh Province, Saudi Arabia
- Coordinates: 24°35′19.6″N 46°19′57.6″E
- Status: Operating
- Opened: December 31, 2025; 8 months ago
- Owner: Qiddiya Investment Company
- Operated by: Six Flags Entertainment Corporation
- Area: 320,000 m^{2} (79 acres)

Attractions
- Total: 28
- Roller coasters: 8
- Water rides: 5
- Website: sixflagsqiddiyacity.com

Six Flags Qiddiya City (Note: Arabic: ستة أعلام مدينة القدية (romanized: Sittat Aʿlām Madīnat al-Qiddiya)) is an amusement park located in Qiddiya City, Riyadh Province, Saudi Arabia. Owned by the Qiddiya Investment Company, it is operated and managed by Six Flags Entertainment Corporation. It is the first Six Flags theme park in Asia and features Falcons Flight, the world's tallest, fastest, and longest roller coaster.

== History ==
=== Background ===
On April 4, 2018, Six Flags Entertainment Corporation announced the development of a new park in Riyadh backed by the Public Investment Fund, Saudi Arabia's sovereign wealth fund, under Saudi Vision 2030, a government initiative to diversify the country's economy. The park was initially slated for a 2022 opening.

On August 26, 2019, the Qiddiya Investment Company unveiled plans for the 79-acre park's design. These included 28 attractions over six themed park areas with a mix of both thrill rides and family-friendly rides. They announced Falcons Flight, which would be the world's longest, tallest, and fastest roller coaster upon completion. The park's opening date was then moved to 2023.

=== Construction ===
On December 12, 2021, Qiddiya Investment Company awarded a $1 billion contract to Almabani General Contractors based in Saudi Arabia and Bouygues Bâtiment International based in France to begin construction on the park.

In 2024, UK Export Finance designated the Six Flags Qiddiya project as "Category A" under its social and environmental risk framework, identifying a potential for significant adverse impact during construction and operation, requiring ongoing monitoring of labour conditions during construction.

=== Opening ===
On November 16, 2025, it was announced that Six Flags Qiddiya City would officially open on December 31, 2025. Ticket prices were confirmed to start at US$87 (SAR325) for adults and US$74 (SAR275) for children, with free admission for infants under four years old. Tickets grant unlimited access to all rides and attractions in the park for a full day.

In the weeks leading up to the official opening, the park hosted a soft opening for the families of employees and selected media influencers. Around two weeks prior to the official opening ceremony, WWE stars including Randy Orton, Liv Morgan, Omos, Tiffany Stratton, and Grayson Waller visited Six Flags Qiddiya City while on tour in Saudi Arabia to promote the Riyadh Season and the 2026 Royal Rumble.

On December 29, 2025, the park was officially inaugurated in a ceremony under the patronage of the Governor of Riyadh Province, Faisal bin Bandar, who formally announced the opening before guests and officials in attendance. The event also featured a live performance by Alicia Keys.

Six Flags Qiddiya City officially opened to the public on New Year’s Eve 2025, becoming the first Six Flags park in Asia and the first located outside North America since 2004 following the sale and spin-off of the former Six Flags European Division theme parks (Six Flags Holland and Six Flags Belgium) to Palamon Capital Partners (StarParks).

== Areas and attractions ==
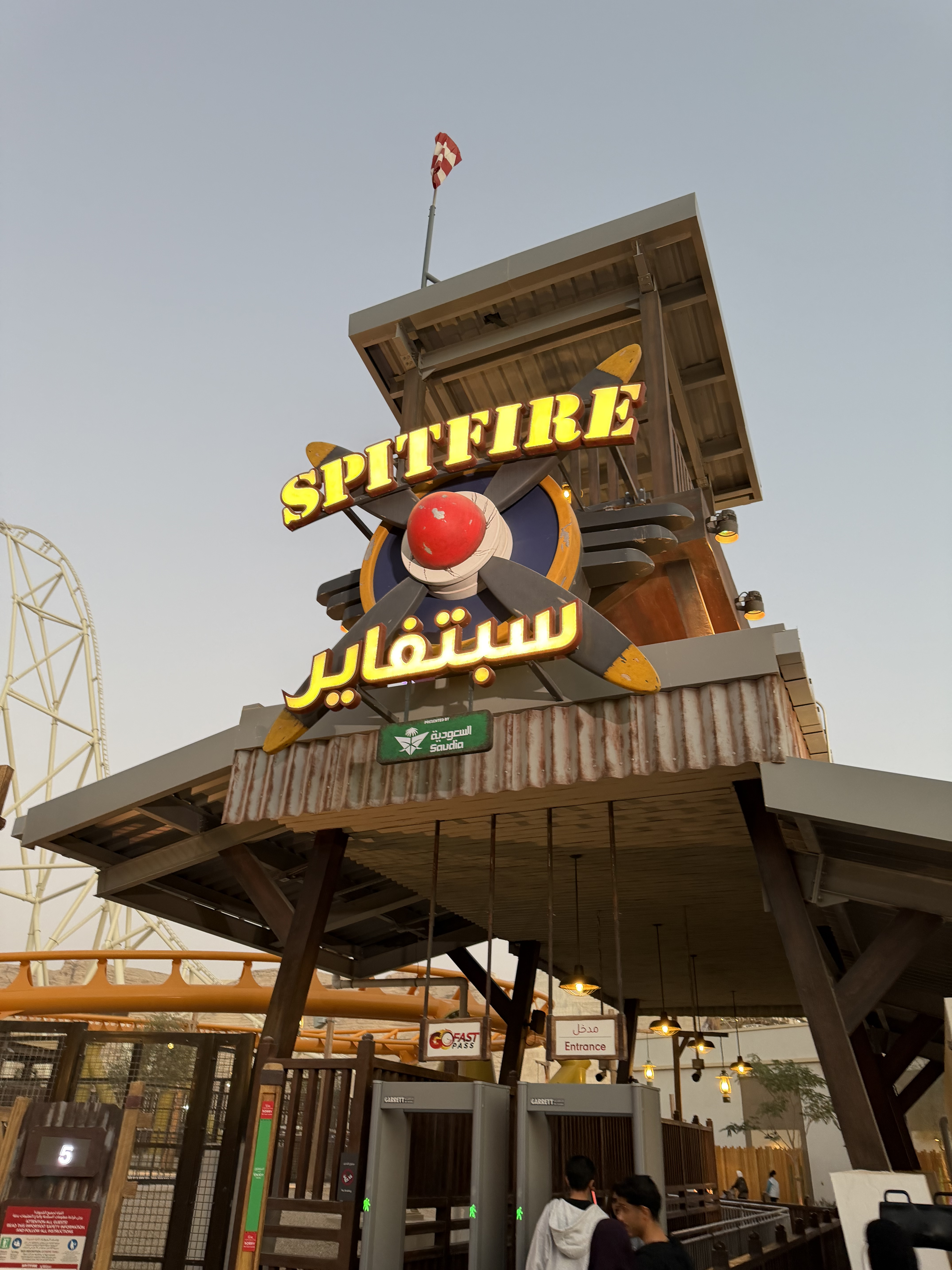
The entrance to Spitfire in the Valley of Fortune area of the park.

=== Steam Town ===
Steam Town is themed around "mechanical marvels" and "dynamic contraptions."

Ride	Year opened	Manufacturer	Description
Iron Rattler	2025	Vekoma	A steel tilt coaster which is the world's tallest of its kind.
Saw Mill Falls	2025	Mack Rides	A water coaster ride.
Sprockenator	2025	Zamperla	A dynamic ride with rotating arms carrying gondolas.
Steel Stampede	2025	Unknown	A spinning platform ride.

=== City of Thrills ===
City of Thrills is described as a "future city" with Arabic design motifs.

Ride	Year opened	Manufacturer	Description
Adrena-Line	2025	Vekoma	A high-speed suspended coaster.
Falcons Flight	2025	Intamin	A steel exa coaster. It is the world's tallest, longest, and fastest roller coaster. It is the signature attraction of Six Flags Qiddiya City.
Sirocco Tower	2025	S&S – Sansei Technologies	A drop tower ride. It is the world's tallest drop tower.
Wind Rider	2025	Zamperla	A kite flyer ride.

=== Twilight Gardens ===
Twilight Gardens is an "oversized landscape" geared towards children and families.

Ride	Year opened	Manufacturer	Description
Amirat Al-Buhayra (Princess of the Lake)	2025	Unknown	An interactive water ride.
Kaleidoscope Balloons	2025	Unknown	A balloon race ride.
The Enchanted Greenhouse	2025	ETF Ride Systems	A family dark ride.
Twilight Express	2025	Vekoma	A steel family coaster.

=== Discovery Springs ===
Discovery Springs is the aquatic section of the park, meant to represent a desert oasis.

Ride	Year opened	Manufacturer	Description
Big Splash	2025	Zamperla	A water plunge ride.
Into the Deep	2025	Triotech	A dark ride.
Sea Stallion	2025	Maurer Rides	A steel "rider-controlled" coaster.
Water Wheel	2025	Unknown	A spinning family water ride.
Zoomaflooma	2025	WhiteWater West	A log flume ride.

=== Grand Exposition ===
Grand Exposition is inspired by the "innovation" and "nostalgia" of international exhibitions.

Ride	Year opened	Manufacturer	Description
Arabian Carousel	2025	Unknown	A carousel with horses and camels which features Arabian melodies.
Colossus	2025	Great Coasters International	A wooden hybrid coaster.
Expo Flyer	2025	Unknown	A swing ride.
Gyrospin	2025	Zamperla	A 173-foot tall pendulum ride.
Roundabout	2025	Unknown	A bumper car ride.

=== Valley of Fortune ===
Valley of Fortune is a "land of adventure" with a backdrop of "time-worn architectural ruins."

Ride	Year opened	Manufacturer	Description
Canyon Charters	2025	Unknown	An elevated swing ride.
Skywatch	2025	Intamin	A flying tent flat ride.
Spitfire	2025	Intamin	A steel launch coaster. It features the tallest inversion on a roller coaster.
Treasure Trail	2025	Zamperla	A family dark ride.

== Records ==
World records at Six Flags Qiddiya City
Attraction	Record	Specifications
Falcons Flight	Tallest, fastest, and longest roller coaster	Height: 195 m (640 ft) Top speed: 250 km/h (155 mph); Track length: 4,250 m (2.6 mi); Classified as an Exa Coaster
Sirocco Tower	Tallest free-standing shot tower	Height: 145 m (475 ft)
Gyrospin	Tallest pendulum ride	Maximum swing height: 53 m (173 ft)
Iron Rattler	Tallest tilt coaster	Height: 63.4 m (208 ft) Top speed: 118 km/h (73 mph)
Spitfire	Tallest inverted triple-launch roller coaster	Height: 73 m (240 ft)
