= King Faisal Sports City Stadium =

Sport City at alBaha region, Saudi Arabia

King Faisal Sport City Stadium
- Interactive map of King Faisal Sport City Stadium
- Location: Jizan City, Saudi Arabia
- Coordinates: 16°50′25″N 42°35′46″E
- Operator: Hetten FC; Al-Tahami FC
- Capacity: 10,000

Construction
- Opened: 1988

King Faisal Sport City (Arabic: مدينة الملك فيصل الرياضية) is a multi-use Saudi sports facility which is located in the city of Jizan.

== Description ==
It was opened in 1988.

== See also ==
- List of things named after Saudi kings
- List of football stadiums in Saudi Arabia
