= Climate of Saudi Arabia =

Saudi Arabia's Köppen climate classification map.

The climate of Saudi Arabia is marked by high temperatures during the day and low temperatures at night. The country follows the pattern of the desert climate, with the exception of the southwest, which features a localized tropical savannna climate around the Fayfa Mountains due to summer rainfall dominance rather than the spring rains seen further north in Al-Baha, Taif, and Asir. Rainfall averages within Saudi Arabia do not regularly exceed 125 mm, except for in the southwest where annual rainfall averages 400-700 mm with warm to hot summers and cool to cold winters of (-2-17° C).

Climate data for Riyadh (1985-2010)
Month	Jan	Feb	Mar	Apr	May	Jun	Jul	Aug	Sep	Oct	Nov	Dec	Year
Record high °C (°F)	33.0 (91.4)	35.0 (95.0)	38.0 (100.4)	42.0 (107.6)	46.0 (114.8)	47.5 (117.5)	48.4 (119.1)	49.8 (121.6)	46.8 (116.2)	42.5 (108.5)	38.0 (100.4)	32.7 (90.9)	49.8 (121.6)
Mean daily maximum °C (°F)	20.2 (68.4)	23.4 (74.1)	27.7 (81.9)	33.4 (92.1)	39.4 (102.9)	42.5 (108.5)	43.5 (110.3)	43.6 (110.5)	40.4 (104.7)	35.3 (95.5)	27.8 (82.0)	22.2 (72.0)	33.3 (91.9)
Daily mean °C (°F)	11.4 (52.5)	17.3 (63.1)	21.4 (70.5)	26.9 (80.4)	32.9 (91.2)	35.7 (96.3)	36.8 (98.2)	36.7 (98.1)	33.5 (92.3)	28.4 (83.1)	21.5 (70.7)	16.3 (61.3)	26.6 (79.8)
Mean daily minimum °C (°F)	5.0 (41.0)	11.2 (52.2)	15.2 (59.4)	20.4 (68.7)	25.9 (78.6)	28.0 (82.4)	29.3 (84.7)	29.2 (84.6)	25.9 (78.6)	21.2 (70.2)	15.5 (59.9)	10.6 (51.1)	19.8 (67.6)
Record low °C (°F)	−5.4 (22.3)	−3.3 (26.1)	2.4 (36.3)	8.9 (48.0)	15.7 (60.3)	19.8 (67.6)	20.0 (68.0)	20.0 (68.0)	14.4 (57.9)	8.9 (48.0)	4.5 (40.1)	−2.0 (28.4)	−5.4 (22.3)
Average precipitation mm (inches)	12.5 (0.49)	8.0 (0.31)	24.0 (0.94)	28.0 (1.10)	4.9 (0.19)	3.0 (0.12)	3.7 (0.15)	4.0 (0.16)	0.1 (0.00)	0.8 (0.03)	8.7 (0.34)	14.6 (0.57)	112.3 (4.4)
Average rainy days	6.1	4.3	9.4	11.3	3.3	0.0	0.1	0.2	0.0	0.5	3.3	6.3	44.8
Average relative humidity (%)	47	36	32	28	17	11	10	12	14	20	36	47	26
Average dew point °C (°F)	2 (36)	1 (34)	2 (36)	4 (39)	3 (37)	−1 (30)	0 (32)	2 (36)	2 (36)	2 (36)	4 (39)	3 (37)	2 (36)
Mean monthly sunshine hours	212.4	226.6	219.8	242.3	287.7	328.2	332.1	309.2	271.6	311.4	269.2	214.3	3,224.8
Percentage possible sunshine	63	71	59	63	70	80	80	77	74	87	82	65	72
Average ultraviolet index	7	9	11	12	12	12	12	12	12	10	7	6	10
Source 1: "Jeddah Regional Climate Centre South West Asia". Archived from the original on 11 December 2016.
Source 2: Time and Date (dewpoints, 1985-2015); Source 3: Weather2Travel for ultraviolet

== See also ==
- Climate change in Saudi Arabia
- Effects of global warming
