= King Salman International Stadium =

Stadium project in Riyadh, Saudi Arabia

- Proposed design of stadium
- Interactive map of King Salman International Stadium
- Location: Riyadh, Saudi Arabia
- Coordinates: 24.86°N 46.696°E
- Owner: Ministry of Sport
- Operator: Ministry of Sport
- Capacity: 92,760
- Surface: Hybrid grass
- Field size: Field of play: 105m × 68m Pitch area: 125m × 85m

Construction
- Groundbreaking: 2026; 0 years ago (planned)
- Opened: 2029; 3 years' time (planned)
- Architect: Populous

Tenant
- Saudi Arabia national football team (planned)

King Salman International Stadium (Arabic: ملعب الملك سلمان الدولي, romanized: maleabʿ al-malik salman ad-duwali) is a planned multi-purpose stadium with extensive sports facilities and capability of hosting world-class events, which would be the largest within King Abdulaziz Park Project in Riyadh, Saudi Arabia, and the Middle East. One of the 2034 FIFA World Cup stadiums, the stadium is planned to have a capacity of 92,760 people which would host the opening and the final.

== Description ==
=== Construction ===
Construction on the stadium is set to begin no earlier than late 2026. The prequalification deadline was set for 28 April 2026 Its opening will take place in Q4 2029. The venue will comprise a 150-seat Royal Suite, 120 luxury hospitality suites, 300 VIP seats, and 2,200 seats for distinguished guests, with the objective of Saudi Vision 2030 in mind.

The stadium is designed by Populous, with ideas culminating the cultural heritage and natural scenery of Saudi Arabia. The location of the King Salman International Stadium is planned to be in close proximity with the King Khalid International Airport and Riyadh Metro Station, further enhancing the venue as a major transit point in the country.

The venue is named after the current King of Saudi Arabia, King Salman.

=== Post-2034 ===
Upon the conclusion of the World Cup, it is set to primarily become the home of the Saudi Arabia national team.

== See also ==
- List of things named after Saudi kings
- List of football stadiums in Saudi Arabia
