= New Murabba Stadium =

Future sports venue in Riyadh, Saudi Arabia

- Planned design of stadium
- Interactive map of New Murabba Stadium
- Location: New Murabba, Riyadh, Saudi Arabia
- Coordinates: 24.804941674952943°N 46.555456040355246°E,
- Owner: New Murabba
- Operator: New Murabba
- Capacity: 46,010
- Surface: Hybrid grass
- Field size: Field of play: 105m × 68m Pitch area: 125m × 85m

Construction
- Groundbreaking: 2027; 1 year's time (planned)
- Opened: 2032; 6 years' time (planned)
- Architect: Arup Group
- Main contractor: New Murabba Development Company

Tenant
- 2034 FIFA World Cup (planned)

Website
- https://newmurabba.com/en/

New Murabba Stadium (Arabic: ملعب المربَّع, romanized: maleabʿ al-Murabba) was a planned multi-purpose stadium within the New Murabba Project, a real estate development, in Riyadh, Saudi Arabia. It was set to be a venue for the 2034 FIFA World Cup and had a proposed capacity of 46,010 people, where it will host fixtures in the group stage and round of 32.

== Construction ==
Construction on the stadium was due to begin in 2027 with its opening taking place in 2032.

The stadium's design wass inspired by the layered overlapping planes and textured peeling bark of the native acacia tree. The roof was designed to create sheltered spaces for social interaction and movement.

The stadium was designed to prioritize long-term flexibility following the World Cup with adaptable spaces capable of hosting concerts, gaming, and various entertainment events.

== See also ==
- List of football stadiums in Saudi Arabia
