= 2030 FIFA World Cup =

Upcoming association football tournament in Morocco, Portugal and Spain

Copa Mundial de la FIFA 2030 (Spanish) Campeonato do Mundo da FIFA de 2030 (Portuguese) كأس العالم فيفا 2030 (Arabic)

Tournament details
- Host countries: Morocco; Portugal; Spain (Note: with additional Centenary Match hosts of Argentina, Paraguay and Uruguay.)
- Dates: 8 June – 21 July
- Teams: TBA (from 6 confederations)
- Venue: TBA (in TBA host cities)

The 2030 FIFA World Cup is scheduled to be the 24th FIFA World Cup, the quadrennial international football tournament that is contested by the men's national teams of the member associations of FIFA. The tournament is planned to be jointly hosted by Morocco, Portugal, and Spain. In honour of the 100th anniversary of the first edition in 1930, a special match and celebration are scheduled to be held at Estadio Centenario in Montevideo, Uruguay—host stadium of the 1930 final—as well as one match each in Estadio Monumental in Buenos Aires, Argentina, and Estadio Osvaldo Domínguez Dibb in Asunción, Paraguay.

The 2030 tournament will be the first World Cup hosted across more than one confederation, the second in Africa after 2010, and the first in North Africa. Morocco, Paraguay and Portugal will host matches for the first time, while Uruguay, Argentina and Spain will return as hosts for the first time since 1930, 1978, and 1982, respectively.

Morocco, Portugal, Spain, Argentina, Paraguay, and Uruguay all automatically qualified for the tournament as hosts, with Spain becoming the first ever defending champions to later host the tournament after winning their second World Cup in 2026.

== Possible format and expansion ==
At the March 2025 FIFA Council meeting, CONMEBOL proposed a one-off 64-team expansion to honour the tournament's centennial anniversary. Later that year, CONMEBOL leaders met directly with FIFA president Gianni Infantino in New York City to discuss the expansion. In July 2026, Infantino stated that he would consider this expansion. On 20 July 2026, CONMEBOL president Alejandro Domínguez announced that the tournament would feature 64 teams. Critics claim increasing the number of qualified teams to 64 would devalue the qualification process and reduce competition quality. In November 2026, Infantino notified the confederations that the 2030 tournament would remain at 48 teams.

== Trophy ==
In a 12 October 2026 Instagram post, the FIFA Museum in Zurich announced that the FIFA World Cup Trophy, the trophy for the competition in every edition since 1974, would not be displayed on 14 and 15 October, instead being replaced with the "FIFA World Cup 2030 Winner's Trophy" during those two days. While the exact specifications of the FIFA World Cup 2030 Winner's Trophy haven't been announced, a similar commemorative trophy was created for the Copa América Centenario in 2016 to celebrate the Copa América's centenary.

== Host selection ==
FIFA launched the bidding process in 2022. Because of the rule preventing countries belonging to confederations that hosted the two preceding tournaments to host the next, members of AFC and CONCACAF could not bid to host the 2030 FIFA World Cup – AFC as hosts of the World Cup in 2022 (Qatar), and CONCACAF as hosts in 2026 (United States, Canada, and Mexico).

During a friendly match between Portugal and Spain on 7 October 2020, the FPF and RFEF announced their intentions to produce a joint bid for the tournament. Almost two years later, on 5 October 2022, the federations held a joint press conference alongside the Ukrainian Association of Football president Andriy Pavelko. On 29 November, The Guardian reported the Ukrainian part of the bid was likely dead due to Pavelko's arrest on suspicion of embezzlement.

The Royal Moroccan Football Federation–failing to secure hosting rights in 1994, 1998, 2006, 2010 and 2026–bid for the sixth time. On 14 March 2023, King Mohammed VI announced that Morocco would join the Portuguese–Spanish bid.

On 11 December 2024, FIFA confirmed the 2030 World Cup would be jointly hosted by Morocco, Portugal, and Spain. During an extraordinary FIFA Congress meeting, this announcement was made alongside the decision to award the 2034 tournament to Saudi Arabia.

2024 Extraordinary FIFA Congress; 11 December 2024 – Zurich, Switzerland (virtual)
Nation	Round 1
Morocco, Portugal, Spain	Acclamation

== Proposed venues ==
Location of the candidate cities in Morocco, Portugal and Spain to host the 2030 FIFA World Cup.

Prior to finalising the bid book on 31 July 2024, the Royal Spanish Football Federation announced that a proposed 11 stadiums in 9 cities would host matches." The host city list was finalised 12 days later. It includes six stadiums in six cities in Morocco, three stadiums in two cities in Portugal, and eleven stadiums in nine cities in Spain for a total of twenty stadiums in seventeen cities. A total of twenty-three different venues are under consideration for hosting matches during the tournament.

In April 2025, some residents of San Sebastián wrote to FIFA asking to be removed as a host city amid overtourism. On 12 July 2025, Málaga withdrew due to logistical reasons regarding the renovation of Estadio La Rosaleda. On 15 March 2026, the mayor of A Coruña, Inés Rey, and also the president of Deportivo de A Coruña, Juan Carlos Escotet, announced they would withdraw as host city due to hosting costs despite having plans to upgrade the Estadio de Riazor.

Towards the end of March 2026, it was reported that the Royal Spanish Football Federation had submitted bids for Nou Mestalla in Valencia, and Estadio de Balaídos in Vigo, to replace Málaga and A Coruña's stadiums. Previous bids for these stadiums were turned down by FIFA for exceeding the limit of twenty stadiums per tournament.

List of candidate cities and stadiums
Country	City	Stadium	Capacity	Image
Morocco	Agadir	Adrar Stadium	46,000 (after renovation, with future plans or targeted upgrades extending further)	
Morocco	Casablanca	Hassan II Stadium	115,000 (new)	
Morocco	Fez	Fez Stadium	55,800 (after renovation)	
Morocco	Marrakesh	Marrakesh Stadium	45,860 (after renovation)	
Morocco	Rabat	Prince Moulay Abdellah Stadium	69,500 (new)	
Morocco	Tangier	Tangier Grand Stadium	75,500 (after renovation)	
Portugal	Lisbon	Estádio da Luz	80,000 (after renovation)	
Portugal	Lisbon	Estádio José Alvalade	52,095	
Portugal	Porto	Estádio do Dragão	50,033	
Spain	Barcelona	Camp Nou	105,000 (after renovation)	
Spain	Barcelona	RCDE Stadium	40,500	
Spain	Bilbao	San Mamés Stadium	53,331	
Spain	Las Palmas	Gran Canaria Stadium	44,500 (after renovation)	
Spain	Madrid	Bernabéu	83,186	
Spain	Madrid	Metropolitano Stadium	70,692	
Spain	San Sebastián	Anoeta Stadium	42,300	
Spain	Seville	Estadio de La Cartuja	70,000 (after renovation)	
Spain	Valencia	Nou Mestalla	70,044 (new)	
Spain	Vigo	Balaídos Stadium	44,000 (after renovation)	
Spain	Zaragoza	La Romareda	43,110 (new)	

Three South American cities were also selected in the bid book to host the three centenary matches.

Location of the host cities of the 2030 FIFA World Cup centenary matches.

List of host cities and stadiums
Country	City	Stadium	Capacity	Image
Argentina	Buenos Aires	Estadio Monumental	100,000 (after renovation)	
Paraguay	Asunción	Estadio Osvaldo Domínguez Dibb	46,000 (new)	
Uruguay	Montevideo	Estadio Centenario	62,782 (after renovation)	

== Teams ==
=== Qualification ===
Teams qualified Teams still able to qualify Not a FIFA member

All six host nations qualified for the World Cup.

CAF
- Morocco (co-host)
CONMEBOL
- Argentina (centenary match co-host)
- Paraguay (centenary match co-host)
- Uruguay (centenary match co-host)
UEFA
- Portugal (co-host)
- Spain (co-host)

==== Format changes ====
Two regional confederations have announced changes to their qualifying format for this tournament:

===== CONCACAF =====
On 6 February 2026, CONCACAF announced their qualifying format for the 2030 FIFA World Cup.

- Round 1: The 22 teams ranked 14–35 in the CONCACAF rankings will be drawn into pairs and play a home-and-away matchup during the first half of the September–October 2027 international window with the 11 winners advancing to Round 2.
- Round 2: The top 13 ranked associations in CONCACAF will be joined by the 11 winners from the Round 1 to create six groups of four teams with each facing each other home-and-away. The top two from each group advance to the final round. Round 2 will begin during the second half of the September–October 2027 international window with later matches in November 2027 and March 2028.
- Final round: The 12 teams that advanced from Round 2 will be divided up into three groups of four with each team facing each other home-and-away. The top two teams in each group will automatically qualify for the World Cup while the two better third-placed finishers will qualify for the play-in. The final round will be played in June 2028 and in the 2029 September–October international window.
- Play-in: The two teams will play each other home-and-away with the aggregate winner qualifying for the FIFA intercontinental play-offs. The two matches will take place in November 2029.

===== UEFA =====
On 20 May 2026, UEFA announced a new qualification format mirroring both the Champions League and Nations League. A two-tier qualification process will be created where major teams will no longer play minor teams to remove uncompetitive games. Under the new rules, the 36 highest-ranked countries—as determined by the 2028–29 Nations League—will be drawn into three groups of 12 in League 1. Teams in those groups would each play six games against six different opponents and be ranked in a 12-team league table. The best-ranked teams of each group of League 1 will qualify for the World Cup, with the remaining places allocated via play-offs. The remaining 18 lower-ranked countries will take part in League 2, split into three groups. All teams in both Leagues will play six home-and-away matches and the system of play-offs will involve teams from both Leagues—those who fall short of direct qualification in League 1 along with top teams from League 2. More details are expected to be released in late 2026 or early 2027.

UEFA initially boycotted FIFA events over the FIFA Forward Enterprise proposal in July 2026, which would include the 2030 FIFA World Cup, but provisionally suspended the boycott after receiving written assurance the proposal was permanently cancelled. The UEFA Executive Committee has indicated that they will reinstate the boycott if deemed necessary.

== Marketing ==
=== Broadcasting rights ===
- Australia – SBS
- China – CCTV
- Croatia – HRT
- Czech Republic – ČT, TV Nova
- Bulgaria, Czech Republic, Croatia and Hungary – EBU
- France – M6, beIN Sports
- Germany – Magenta Sport
- India – Zee
- Ireland – RTÉ
- Netherlands – NOS
- New Zealand – TVNZ
- Romania – Antena
- Slovakia – TV JOJ
- South Korea – JTBC
- Spain – Netflix
- Thailand – MONOMAX Sports
- United Kingdom – BBC, ITV

=== Sponsorship ===
FIFA partners	FIFA World Cup sponsors
Adidas; Coca-Cola; Hyundai–Kia; Qatar Airways; Visa	AB InBev (Budweiser+Others); Mengniu Dairy

== Controversies ==
=== Manipulation of Spanish venues ===
On 23 March 2025, it was reported that the Royal Spanish Football Federation manipulated the classification scores when choosing the venues in order to exclude Balaídos Stadium and include Anoeta Stadium.

=== Inclusion of centenary match hosts ===
With the FIFA rotation system, which prevents continental associations from hosting consecutive or near-consecutive World Cups, CONCACAF (which won the rights to host the 2026 World Cup), CONMEBOL, UEFA, and CAF were all unable to bid for 2034, leaving it open only for the AFC and OFC. This led to accusations that FIFA intentionally selected these countries, especially the centenary match hosts in the CONMEBOL region, to ensure that Saudi Arabia would win its bid for the 2034 tournament unopposed.

=== Animal welfare concerns ===
Animal rights organisations have accused Morocco of killing stray dogs ahead of its co-hosting of the FIFA World Cup. These groups estimate the stray dog population at 3 million and have alleged that methods used include poisoning and shooting.

In response, Moroccan authorities adopted Law 19-25 in 2025, which established a legal framework for the management of stray animals. The law introduced measures such as sterilisation, vaccination, identification, and the use of shelters, and restricted the killing of stray animals.

=== Moroccan occupation of Western Sahara ===
Western Sahara is a non-self-governing territory that has been under Moroccan military occupation since 1975. Analysts expect that Morocco will use the World Cup to bolster its claim over Western Sahara, such as through sportswashing. Morocco initially planned to build a stadium in Dakhla for the World Cup, though ultimately no matches will take place in the territory. Morocco regularly expels journalists who bring attention towards the occupation. It is doubling its green energy production in the territory to meet its own demands for the World Cup.

In their 2030 bid document, Morocco, Spain, and Portugal included a map that depicted Western Sahara as Moroccan territory; FIFA's bid evaluation report did not reproduce this map.

=== Gen Z 212 protests ===
In late September 2025, a series of protests erupted in several cities in Morocco led by the youth movement known as Gen Z 212. The protests were sparked by the deterioration of the country's health and education systems and the government's excessive spending on sports infrastructure in preparation for hosting the 2025 Africa Cup of Nations and the upcoming 2030 FIFA World Cup.

=== UEFA boycott ===
On 30 July 2026, following FIFA's announcement of FIFA Forward Enterprise (a proposal to sell stakes in FIFA's tournament operations, including for the World Cup, to private investors), all 55 UEFA member associations agreed on an indefinite boycott of FIFA competitions until the proposal was shelved and assurances were made that such a proposal would not be tabulated again. Two of the 2030 FIFA World Cup hosts – Spain and Portugal – are involved in the boycott. On 31 July, FIFA scrapped the proposal, although UEFA stated that, regardless, it no longer trusts FIFA's governance. After receiving written assurances from FIFA that similar plans would not be explored in the future, UEFA provisionally suspended the boycott on 26 August. The UEFA Executive Committee has indicated that they will reinstate the boycott if deemed necessary.

=== Calls for Morocco's removal as a host ===
On 5 August 2026, Portuguese left-wing political party LIVRE called for Morocco to be removed from hosting the 2030 FIFA World Cup following the Ceuta migration crisis. The party urged the Portuguese and Spanish governments, as well as the European Union and UEFA, to support a hosting arrangement involving only Portugal and Spain, citing Morocco's handling of migration at the Ceuta border and broader human rights concerns. LIVRE spokesperson Jorge Pinto described the crisis as "the last straw" and questioned FIFA's governance and the transparency of its host selection process. The party had also previously criticized Morocco's involvement in the bid over its policies regarding Western Sahara. On the same day, Spanish left-wing political party and member of the Spanish government Sumar registered a non-binding motion calling on the government to discuss with the Spanish Royal Football Federation the need to "review and reevaluate" the current joint organization model with Morocco amid criticism over "grave breaches" on international agreements and human rights violations. Later, far-left party Podemos echoed the call to exclude Morocco from the organization after stating that the country "attacked Spain’s sovereignty". On 6 August, far-right party Vox submitted another non-binding motion asking for the same.
