= List of football stadiums in Saudi Arabia =

The following is a list of stadiums and major venues in Saudi Arabia, including football-specific stadiums, multi-purpose stadium facilities, and other venues used for entertainment and large-scale events.

== Current stadiums ==
Multi-purpose stadiums

#	Image	Stadium	Capacity	City	Province	Home team	Opened
1		King Fahd Sports City Stadium	70,200 after Renovation	Riyadh	Riyadh Province	Saudi Arabia national football team, Cup finals	1987
2		King Abdullah Sports City Stadium	62,345	Jeddah	Mecca Province	Al-Ahli, Al-Ittihad, Cup finals	2014
3		King Abdulaziz Sports City Stadium	38,000	Mecca	Mecca Province	Al-Wehda	
4		Prince Abdullah Al-Faisal Sports City Stadium	27,000	Jeddah	Mecca Province	Al-Ahli, Al-Ittihad	
5		King Saud University Stadium	27,000	Riyadh	Riyadh Province	Al-Nassr	
6		Kingdom Arena Stadium	27,000	Riyadh	Riyadh Province	Al-Hilal	
7		Prince Mohamed bin Fahd Stadium	26,000	Dammam	Eastern Province	Al-Nahda	
8		King Abdullah Sports City Stadium	25,000	Buraidah	Al-Qassim Province	Al-Raed, Al-Taawoun	
9		Prince Mohammed bin Abdulaziz Sports City Stadium	24,000	Medina	Medina Province	Ohod, Al-Ansar	
10		Prince Faisal bin Fahd Sports City Stadium	22,500	Riyadh	Riyadh Province	Al-Riyadh	
11		King Fahd Sports City Stadium	20,000	Taif	Mecca Province	Wej	
12		Prince Sultan bin Abdulaziz Sports City Stadium	20,000	Abha	Asir Province	Abha, Damac	
13		Prince Abdullah bin Jalawi Sport City Stadium	19,550	Al-Hasa	Eastern Province	Al-Adalah, Hajer, Al-Jeel	
14		Prince Abdulaziz bin Musa'ed Sports City Stadium	12,250	Ḥaʼil	Ḥa'il Province	Al-Tai, Al-Jabalain	
15		King Saud Sport City Stadium	12,000	Al-Bahah	Al-Bahah Province	Al-Ain, Al-Hejaz	
16		King Faisal Sport City Stadium	12,000	Jizan	Jazan Province	Hetten, Al-Tuhami	
17		King Khalid Sport City Stadium	12,000	Tabuk	Tabuk Province	Al-Watani, Neom	
18		Prince Naif bin Abdulaziz Sports City Stadium	12,000	Qatif	Eastern Province	Al-Khaleej, Mudhar	
19		Prince Saud bin Jalawi Sports City Stadium	11,358	Khobar	Eastern Province	Al-Qadsiah	
20		Prince Mohammed bin Abdullah Al Faisal Stadium	10,000	Jeddah	Mecca Province	Al-Ahli	
21		Prince Hathloul bin Abdulaziz Sports City Stadium	10,000	Najran	Najran Province	Al-Okhdood, Najran	
22		Najran University Stadium	10,000	Najran	Najran Province	Najran	
23		Al-Hazem FC Stadium	8,000	Ar-rass	Riyadh Province	Al-Hazem, Al-Kholood	
24		Al-Majma'ah Sports City Stadium	7,000	Al-Majma'ah	Riyadh Province	Al-Faisaly, Al-Fayha	
25		Prince Abdullah bin Musa'ed Sports City Stadium	6,000	Arar	Northern Borders Province	Arar	
26		Prince Nasser bin Abdulaziz Sports City Stadium	5,000	Wadi ad-Dawasir	Riyadh Province	Al-Wadi, Al-Faw	
27		Department of Education Stadium	5,000	Unaizah	Al-Qassim Province	Al-Arabi	
28		Al-Shoulla Club Stadium	5,000	Al-Kharj	Riyadh Province	Al-Shoulla	
29		Al-Najma Club Stadium	3,000	Unaizah	Al-Qassim Province	Al-Najma	
30		Al-Bukiryah Club Stadium	3,000	Al-Bukayriyah	Al-Qassim Province	Al-Bukiryah	

Dedicated Football Stadiums

#	Image	Stadium	Capacity	City	Province	Home team	Opened
1		Al-Shabab Club Stadium	15,000	Riyadh	Riyadh Province	Al-Shabab	1984
2		Al-Ettifaq Club Stadium	15,000	Dammam	Eastern Province	Al-Ettifaq	1983
3		Al-Fateh Stadium	11,000	Al-Mubarraz	Eastern Province	Al-Fateh	2004

== Entertainment Complexes ==
Name	City	Province	Capacity	Opened
Jeddah Super Dome	Jeddah	Mecca Province	40,000	2021
Kingdom Arena	Riyadh	Riyadh Province	27,000	2024
Mohammed Abdo Arena	Riyadh	Riyadh Province	22,000	2019
Diriyah Arena	Diriyah	Riyadh Province	15,000	2019

== Defunct stadiums ==
Stadium	City	Province	Capacity	Closed
Air Defence Stadium Jeddah	Jeddah	Mecca Province	24,000	2022

== Future stadiums ==
Stadium	City	Province	Capacity	Opening
King Salman International Stadium	Riyadh	Riyadh	92,000	2029
Jeddah Central Development Stadium	Jeddah	Mecca	45,000	2027
Murabba Stadium	Riyadh	Riyadh	45,000	2032
Qiddiya Stadium	Qiddiya City	Riyadh	40,000	2029
Aramco Stadium	Khobar	Eastern	46,096	2026
NEOM Stadium	Neom	Tabuk	46,010	2032
New Prince Faisal bin Fahd Sports City Stadium	Riyadh	Riyadh	46,000	2027
King Abdullah Economic City Stadium	Rabigh	Mecca	45,700	2032
King Khalid University Stadium	Abha	Asir	45,428	2032
Qiddiya Coast Stadium	Jeddah	Mecca	46,096	2032
ROSHN Stadium	Riyadh	Riyadh	46,000	2032
South Riyadh Stadium	Riyadh	Riyadh	47,060	2032

== See also ==
- Football in Saudi Arabia
- List of Asian stadiums by capacity
- List of association football stadiums by capacity
- List of association football stadiums by country
- List of sports venues by capacity
- Lists of stadiums
