= Qiddiya City =

City and entertainment megaproject in Riyadh Province, Saudi Arabia

Qiddiya City مدينة القدية
- Planned city
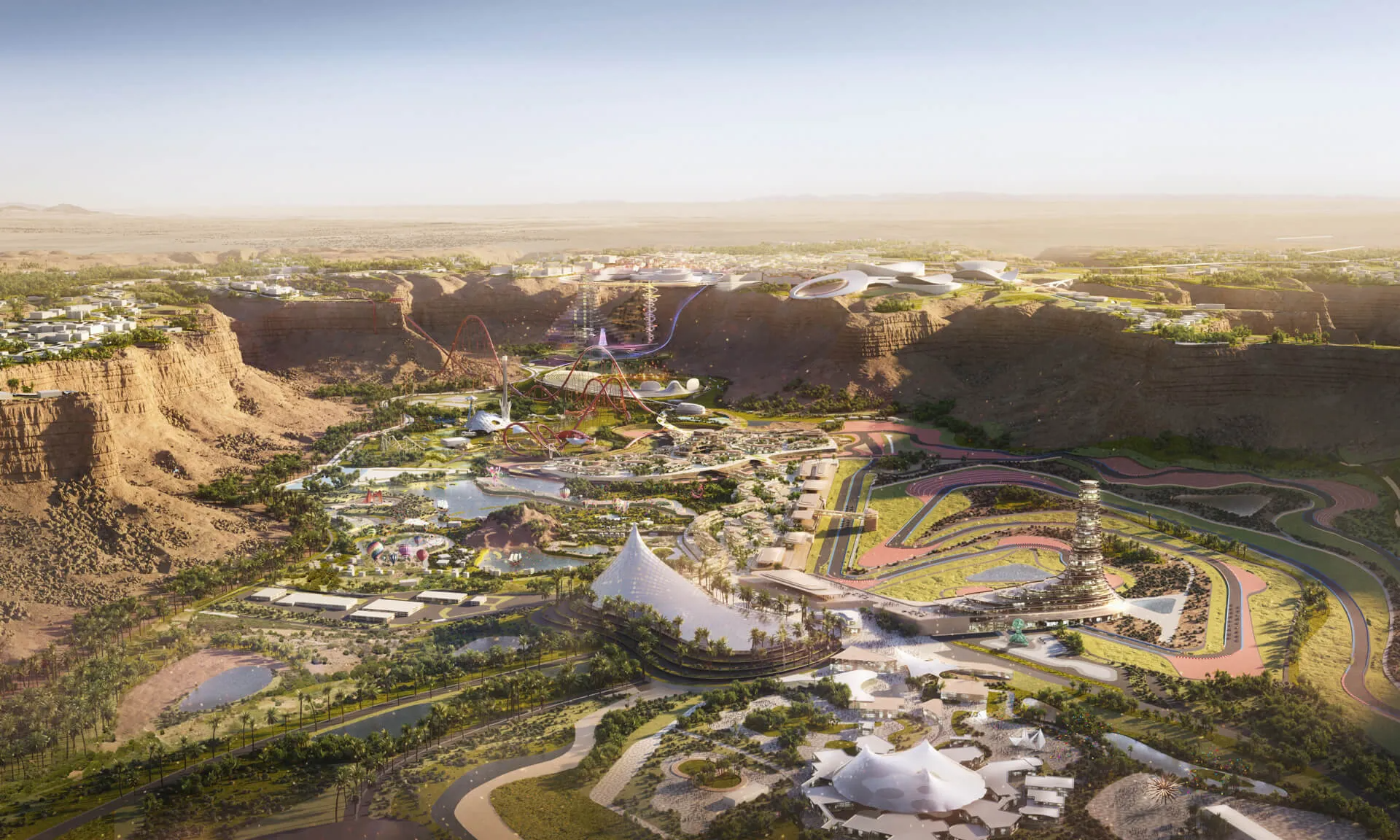
- Concept illustration of Qiddiya City

- Location within Saudi Arabia
- Coordinates: 24°35′17″N 46°20′19″E
- Country: Saudi Arabia
- Province: Riyadh Province
- Region: Najd
- Established: 7 April 2017; 9 years ago
- Founder: Mohammed bin Salman

Government
  - Type: State-owned development
  - Body: Public Investment Fund
  - Chairman: Mohammed bin Salman
  - Secretary General: Yasir Al-Rumayyan

Area
  - Total: 360 km^{2} (140 sq mi)

Population
  - Total: 500,000 (Projected)
- Time zone: UTC+03:00 (SAST)
- Website: qiddiyacity.sa

Qiddiya City (Note: (Arabic: القدية, romanized: al-qiddiyyah / al-giddiyyah, pronounced [ə- alɡɪdːijːa])) is an under-construction planned city and tourism megaproject situated along the Tuwaiq Escarpment in Riyadh Province, Saudi Arabia.

== History ==
The Qiddiya project was announced in April 2017 as part of Saudi Vision 2030, a national strategy aimed at diversifying the Saudi economy and increasing domestic tourism and entertainment spending. The project is supported by the Public Investment Fund and was envisioned as a large-scale entertainment, sports, and cultural destination near Riyadh.

Construction began in early 2019. Early projections estimated annual visitation of up to 17 million by 2030 and the creation of approximately 325,000 jobs. The first phase of development was initially scheduled for completion in 2023 but was later revised, with timelines extending into the mid-2020s.

The project includes major developments such as Six Flags Qiddiya City, the Aquarabia waterpark, a purpose-built Formula One circuit, and a planned Dragon Ball theme park, the first of its kind worldwide. These announcements prompted criticism from international observers and human rights organisations, who accused Saudi Arabia of attempting to sportswash its international image and raised concerns over the country’s human rights record, including issues affecting LGBT people.

Concerns have also been raised regarding labour conditions and human rights associated with the Qiddiya megaproject. In 2024, UK Export Finance classified the project as Category A under its social and environmental risk framework, citing the potential for significant adverse environmental and social impacts during construction and operation. Human Rights Watch reported risks linked to the Kafala system, wage theft, and heat stress affecting migrant workers involved in Saudi Arabia’s megaprojects, including Qiddiya City. The Business & Human Rights Resource Centre (BHRRC) has additionally documented concerns over worker safety, including incidents involving vehicle strikes, falls from heights, and exposure to extreme heat at Qiddiya construction sites.

Six Flags Qiddiya City opened on 31 December 2025 as the first operational asset of Qiddiya City, marking the initial public opening of the wider development.

== Qiddiya company ==
Qiddiya Investment Company (Arabic: شركة القدية للاستثمار) is a private Saudi company responsible for developing Qiddiya City in Riyadh Province. Owned by the Public Investment Fund, the company manages the city’s projects and properties.

Qiddiya Investment Company
- Type: Closed Joint-stock company
- Industry: Entertainment, Real Estate
- Founded: 10 May 2018; 8 years ago
- Headquarters: Riyadh
- Area served: Saudi Arabia
- Key people: Mohammed bin Salman (Chairman); Yasir Al-Rumayyan (Secretary General)
- Owner: Public Investment Fund
- Website: www.qiddiya.com

== Sports complexes ==
Sport	Venue	Announced	Opened	Description	Ref
Formula One	Qiddiya Speed Park Track	5 March 2024	Under construction	An FIA Grade 1 circuit planned to host Formula One, WEC and MotoGP events.	
Football	Prince Mohammed bin Salman Stadium	15 January 2024	Under construction	A multi-purpose stadium planned as a venue for the 2034 FIFA World Cup and home ground for Al-Nassr and Al-Hilal.	
Thoroughbred racing	Qiddiya Horse Racing Venue	10 February 2026	Under construction	A 70,000-capacity thoroughbred racing complex with dirt and turf tracks, planned as the venue for the Saudi Cup. The turf track features a straight-mile track. The project includes an equine hospital.	
Tennis	National Tennis Centre	17 June 2026	Under construction	A tennis complex with 28 hard courts and two clay courts designed to host ATP, WTA and International Tennis Federation events.	

== Theme parks ==
Park	Announced	Opened	Description	Ref
Six Flags Qiddiya City	4 April 2018	31 December 2025	The third Six Flags park located outside North America after Six Flags Belgium (now Walibi Belgium) and Six Flags Holland (now Walibi Holland), featuring Falcons Flight — the world's tallest, fastest, and longest roller coaster.	
Aquarabia Qiddiya City	23 February 2022	23 April 2026	A water park inspired by the Arabian Peninsula, and the largest in the Middle East and North Africa.	
Dragon Ball theme park	22 March 2024	Under construction	The world's first theme park dedicated to the Dragon Ball franchise.	
Mercedes-AMG World of Performance	19 February 2025	Under construction	The first Mercedes-AMG experience center worldwide, featuring exhibits, driving simulators, and on-track driving activities.	

== Transportation ==
=== Rail ===
On 21 September 2025, the Royal Commission for Riyadh City announced plans for the Qiddiya High Speed Railway. The railway will have three stations: one at King Salman International Airport, one in the King Abdullah Financial District, and one serving Qiddiya City.

=== Metro ===
On 22 December 2025, plans were announced for Riyadh Metro Line 7, with the first phase scheduled for implementation in 2026. The line is planned to extend from the northwestern Diriyah Governorate to Qiddiya City.

== See also ==
- Provinces of Saudi Arabia
- List of governorates of Saudi Arabia
- List of cities and towns in Saudi Arabia
