= 2034 FIFA World Cup =

Future association football tournament in Saudi Arabia

كأس العالم فيفا 2034 (Arabic)

Tournament details
- Host country: Saudi Arabia
- Dates: TBA
- Teams: TBA (from 6 (Note: European teams may not participate if UEFA's boycott over the FIFA Forward Enterprise proposal continues.) confederations)
- Venue: TBA (in TBA host cities)

The 2034 FIFA World Cup will be the 25th FIFA World Cup, a quadrennial international football tournament contested by the men's national teams of the member associations of FIFA. In December 2024, Saudi Arabia was formally confirmed as the host nation by FIFA following an uncontested bidding process. It will be the third tournament hosted in Asia, after South Korea and Japan in 2002 and Qatar in 2022, the third in the Arab world after Qatar in 2022 and Morocco in 2030, and the first since 2022 to be hosted by one nation. Saudi Arabia will be the second host nation from the Arabian Peninsula in the span of twelve years.

Following FIFA's decision to host the 2030 tournament across three confederations (Africa, Europe and South America), hosting eligibility for 2034 was restricted to member associations from the Asian Football Confederation (AFC) and Oceania Football Confederation (OFC). Saudi Arabia was left as the sole bidder after the bidding deadline was accelerated, drawing criticism from media observers regarding the process.

== Host selection ==
The bidding process for the 2034 World Cup began on 4 October 2023 and initially used the same requirements as the 2030 World Cup. FIFA later lowered the requirement for the number of existing stadiums with a minimum capacity of 40,000 from seven to four. Due to FIFA's confederation rotation policy, only member associations from the Asian Football Confederation and Oceania Football Confederation were eligible to host. FIFA made the decision to host the 2030 World Cup in three continents (Africa, Europe and South America) and the 2026 World Cup was set to be held in North America, which meant that the 2034 World Cup would necessarily have to be held in Asia or Oceania.

On 31 October 2023, FIFA president Gianni Infantino announced that Saudi Arabia would host the 2034 World Cup, making it the third time the Asian Football Confederation has or will host the World Cup, after the 2002 tournament, which was hosted in Japan and South Korea, and the 2022 tournament in Qatar. It is also the second time it will be held in the Middle East, after Qatar in 2022.

According to investigative reporting by The New York Times, Infantino played a key role in the selection of Saudi Arabia as host. He engaged in private diplomacy on Saudi Arabia's behalf, as he explored whether Greece would be willing to partner with Saudi Arabia to host the 2030 World Cup. When Spain, Portugal, and Morocco announced that they would bid together for the 2030 World Cup, the Saudis considered it unlikely that the bid could be beaten. Thus, the Saudis backed out of bidding for 2030. FIFA subsequently made two moves that The New York Times described as "curious"; FIFA announced that the 2030 World Cup would be jointly hosted by Spain, Morocco, and Portugal, but that the first three matches would be hosted in Argentina, Paraguay, and Uruguay as part of commemorations of the 100th anniversary of the inaugural World Cup in Uruguay. This decision ruled Europe, Africa, and South America out as potential bidders for the 2034 World Cup, and meant that the only potential bidders could be from Asia or Oceania. FIFA also unexpectedly sped up the bidding process for the 2034 World Cup, giving only 25 days for interested nations to express their intent to host. Within minutes, Saudi Arabia announced its intentions to host.

On 11 December 2024, FIFA confirmed that the 2034 World Cup would be hosted by Saudi Arabia. The decision was announced during an Extraordinary FIFA Congress meeting, where the hosts for both the 2030 and 2034 tournaments were finalised following a vote.

2024 Extraordinary FIFA Congress; 11 December 2024 – Zürich, Switzerland (Note: The FIFA extraordinary congress was held online.)
Nation	Round 1
Saudi Arabia	Acclamation

== Proposed venues ==
Location of the candidate cities to host the 2034 FIFA World Cup.

The official bid book for the World Cup bid, released in July 2024, proposed 15 stadiums (ten new and five refurbished), across five cities - Riyadh, Jeddah, Khobar and Abha and NEOM. By October 2026, due to budget constraints at the Public Investment Fund, this had been whittled down to ten stadiums (five new and five refurbished) across four cities, with the NEOM Stadium, New Murabba Stadium, ROSHN Stadium, King Abdullah Economic City Stadium and the Qiddiya Coast Stadium all cancelled.

List of candidate cities and stadiums
City	Stadium	Capacity
Riyadh	King Salman International Stadium	92,760 (new)
Riyadh	King Fahd Sports City Stadium	70,200 (after renovation)
Riyadh	South Riyadh Stadium	47,060 (new)
Riyadh	Prince Faisal bin Fahd Sports City Stadium	46,865 (after renovation)
Riyadh	King Saud University Stadium	46,319 (after renovation)
Riyadh	Prince Mohammed bin Salman Stadium	46,979 (new)
Jeddah	King Abdullah Sports City Stadium	62,345 (after renovation)
Jeddah	Jeddah Central Development Stadium	45,794 (new)
Khobar	Aramco Stadium	46,096 (new)
Abha	King Khalid University Stadium	45,428 (after renovation)

In addition to the venues, 2 FIFA Fan Festival locations have been proposed in each of the host cities. The draw of the groups will take place at the planned Line Convention Center, located in The Line, Neom.

== Teams ==
Teams qualified Teams still able to qualify Not a FIFA member

=== Qualification ===
AFC
- Saudi Arabia (host)

== Controversies ==
Observers characterized the selection of Saudi Arabia as host of the 2034 World Cup as FIFA bending its own rules to pave the way for Saudi Arabia to host the 2034 edition by substantially reducing potential competing host bids. Moreover, FIFA unexpectedly sped up the bidding timeline by at least three years, which hindered other potential bidders. According to reporting by The New York Times, FIFA president Gianni Infantino played a key role in bending FIFA's rules and facilitating the selection of Saudi Arabia as host.

=== Human rights ===
The selection of Saudi Arabia as a host has attracted controversy since the start due to human rights violations in the country. Law, human rights, and Saudi activists have asked for FIFA to put pressure on the country to improve its human rights record, similar to the pressure put on Qatar when it hosted in 2022. The trade union Building and Wood Workers' International has warned that FIFA awarding Saudi Arabia the tournament goes against their conditions of human rights. When Clifford Chance did an assessment of human rights in the country, the report was criticised by eleven rights organisations including Amnesty International and Human Rights Watch. The nontransparent nature of the bid has also been criticised by Norwegian Football Federation president Lise Klaveness, who stated that despite the reforms after the 2015 FIFA corruption case, little measures were taken to ensure that hosts met risk and human rights assessments; the NFF later abstained from voting on 11 December. Norwegian club Fredrikstad have put pressure on their federation to boycott the tournament.

On 11 November 2024, Amnesty International called on FIFA to stop the bidding process for the 2034 World Cup, citing human rights concerns in Saudi Arabia. On 21 November 2024, ITUC-Africa filed a complaint to the United Nations over the mistreatment of African migrant workers in Saudi Arabia and warned that the 2034 World Cup could amplify existing problems for migrant workers. On 25 November 2024, United States Senators Ron Wyden and Dick Durbin urged FIFA not to award the 2034 World Cup to Saudi Arabia citing human rights concerns for citizens, workers, athletes, tourists, and members of the press in the country with no guarantee that human rights would be upheld during the tournament, especially for women and LGBTQ people whose rights would be the most at risk. In Saudi Arabia, homosexuality and transgender identities are widely seen as immoral and same sex acts are punishable by death. Three days later, German and Danish MEPs Daniel Freund and Niels Fuglsang respectively criticised the closed door nature of the bid and suggested for a boycott if the tournament was awarded to Saudi Arabia as they believed it was the only way to ensure a prevention of human rights violations. UN High Commissioner for Human Rights Volker Türk called for FIFA to keep human rights as the top priority for hosting the tournament in Saudi Arabia. On 27 January 2025, FIFA rejected calls for an independent group to monitor the conditions of migrant workers in Saudi Arabia, stating that the government made commitments to a workers' welfare system to monitor compliance with labour rights standards for tournament-related projects. Helene Elatr, widow of assassinated Washington Post journalist Jamal Khashoggi asked that FIFA honour her late husband during the tournament as allegations have been made against the Saudi government for their involvement in his 2018 assassination in Istanbul.

In May 2025, lawyers Mark Pieth, Stefan Wehrenberg, and Rodney Dixon submitted an official complaint to FIFA saying that the bidding process "failed to ensure that human rights standards were met". The complaint argues that by awarding the World Cup to Saudi Arabia, FIFA is obligated to ensure the country upholds human rights standards.

Despite this, some football federations that were previously critical of Qatar hosting their World Cup such as The Football Association, the Danish Football Association, the German Football Association, the Swiss Football Association, the Swedish Football Association, and the Royal Belgian Football Association, have either backed Saudi Arabia or remained silent. The DBU chairman Jesper Møller and DBU secretary general Erik Brogger Rasmussen have stated that they are optimistic that the human rights situation will improve by the start of the World Cup as part of Saudi Vision 2030; the FA stated that they would back Saudi Arabia to avoid accusations of hypocrisy if they wanted England to participate; the RBFA congratulated Saudi Arabia for their bid and were also optimistic about human rights improving; the ASF-SFV backed Saudi Arabia but called for an independent human rights group to monitor the situation; the SvFF backed Saudi Arabia's bid to much protest within the federation, resulting in several resignations after the bidding process vote; the DFB later decided to support Saudi Arabia with a goal of working to improve the human rights situation. Meanwhile, German coach Julian Nagelsmann and German captain Joshua Kimmich stated that they will not make a protest about the human rights conditions in the country like the German team did in 2022 and instead focus on football.

==== Immigrants ====
Immigrants and labourers in the wider Gulf region face harsh living conditions, discrimination and racism in violation of their human rights due to the kafala system according to several NGOs. In Saudi Arabia they predominantly come from South Asia, Southeast Asia and Africa, with the top five nationalities being India, Indonesia, Pakistan, Bangladesh and Egypt. Amnesty International said that the human cost of awarding the World Cup to Saudi Arabia was high and that "many will die". In April 2026, the OHCHR called on Saudi Arabia to end the kafala system as despite the country's promise to implement labour reforms, no such changes had been noticed in the country's preparation for the tournament.

==== Deaths of migrant workers ====
On 12 March 2025, the first migrant worker death was reported. Muhammad Arshad, originally from Pakistan, died while working on the Aramco Stadium in Khobar. He died falling to his death from an upper level of the stadium. In May 2025, FairSquare and Human Rights Watch reported that numerous migrant workers had died from decapitation, electrocution, and from falling to their deaths among others, and that Saudi authorities were failing to protect workers from these preventable deaths, as well as not investigating workplace incidents, and not ensuring compensation for the families of those workers who died.

=== Alcohol ===
On 12 February 2025, Prince Khalid bin Bandar Al Saud stated that alcohol would not be sold during the tournament, including at hotels. However, reports stated that the ban on alcohol would be lifted in 2026, allowing for limited alcohol to be sold at tourist areas such as hotels and fan fests, though Saudi authorities denied this.

=== Environmental impact ===
Fossil Free Football has raised concerns about the tournament stating that the number of new stadiums that would be built would increase pollution, and that the tournament would be used to greenwash the country's fossil fuel industry.

=== Scheduling ===
Owing to Saudi Arabia's climate, sporting events in the country typically take place during the cooler months of the year. For example, the 2024–25 Saudi Pro League runs from August until May. In particular, the peak months of the Northern Hemisphere summer present particularly difficult conditions for playing sport in the country, with minimum nighttime temperatures of 26–29 °C (79–84 °F) and daily mean temperatures of 33–37 °C (91–99 °F) between May and September. The climate of neighbouring Qatar is similar to that of Saudi Arabia. When Qatar hosted the 2022 World Cup, the tournament was held in November and December in order to ensure comfortable playing conditions. There has therefore been speculation that the 2034 tournament may be scheduled at a similar time of year.

European football leagues generally run from August until May, meaning that the 2022 World Cup scheduling interrupted the European football season. Football competitions in many other parts of the world in which World Cup players also compete, however, either do not run over the Northern Hemisphere winter at all (for example, China, Japan, and Brazil), or start or end very close to the Northern Hemisphere winter, to the extent that disruption to competition at this time of year is minimal (such as Argentina, Colombia, and Egypt). Academic meta-analysis of the impacts of playing a major international tournament in the middle of European club seasons suggests the performance of players was improved by the change in scheduling as compared to other tournaments. Commentators also suggested that games were entertaining for their high quality of football.

Consternation over the scheduling of the World Cup in Qatar came from fans who had become accustomed to the tradition of experiencing World Cup tournaments from June to July. Across parts of the world in which the climate is hostile to social watching of the tournament when held in June or July, however, a winter tournament meant that, for the first time, fans were able to have this experience.

Other potential scheduling issues may include Ramadan in December, as well as Saudi Arabia's status as host of the 2034 Asian Games in Riyadh in November and December. The International Olympic Committee has stated that they do not perceive a risk of a schedule clash between the FIFA World Cup and the 2034 Winter Olympics in Salt Lake City, Utah, which is currently scheduled to be held 10–26 February 2034. But because of Ramadan, it is possible that the 2034 FIFA World Cup could be shifted to January 2035, and FIFA President Gianni Infantino said he is open to consider rescheduling because of this.

=== Airports and airlines ===
The October 2026 attacks on Saudi Arabia airports—particularly King Khalid International Airport in Riyadh—are part of a broader regional escalation involving Houthi rebels and the wider Middle East conflict, raising broader security and logistical concerns for the region, though FIFA has not altered or officially announced any changes to the 2034 FIFA World Cup hosting plans as a direct result of these strikes. Major carriers (including Etihad Airways, Qatar Airways, Air India, FlyDubai, and the Lufthansa Group) suspended or rerouted flights, and aviation authorities issued warnings regarding Saudi airspace safety. Security analysts note that the escalation of Houthi cross-border strikes and regional warfare highlights long-term airspace and infrastructure vulnerability, which tournament organizers and international bodies will continue to monitor as 2034 approaches.

== See also ==
- Football in Saudi Arabia
- FIFA World Cup
- List of FIFA World Cup hosts
- Sportswashing in Saudi Arabia
