= Jeddah Central Development Stadium =

Football stadium in Jeddah, Saudi Arabia

- Planned design of the stadium
- Interactive map of Jeddah Central Development Stadium
- Location: Jeddah, Saudi Arabia
- Coordinates: 21°32′09.5″N 39°07′47.6″E
- Owner: Jeddah Central Development Company
- Operator: Jeddah Central Development Company
- Capacity: 45,794
- Surface: Grass
- Field size: Field of play: 105m × 68m Pitch area: 125m × 85m

Construction
- Groundbreaking: 2024; 2 years ago
- Opened: 2027; 1 year's time (planned)
- Architects: Gerkan, Marg and Partners and Khatib and Alami
- Builders: China Railway Construction Corporation and Sama Construction and Contracting
- Main contractors: Sama Construction and Contracting

Tenants
- 2034 World Cup (planned); 2 Saudi Pro League Clubs (planned)

The Jeddah Central Development Stadium (Arabic: استاد التطوير المركزي بجدة) is a planned football stadium under construction in Jeddah, Saudi Arabia. It is set to be a venue for the 2034 FIFA World Cup and has a proposed capacity of 45,794 people, where it will host fixtures in the group stage and round of 32.

== Development ==
=== Construction ===
Construction on the stadium began in February 2024 with its opening planned for 2027. In July 2022, it was announced that the stadium will be designed by Gerkan, Marg and Partners and urban development consultants Khatib and Alami. In January 2024, the contract to construct the stadium was awarded to China Railway Construction Corporation and SAMA contracting.

It will be located in the Jeddah historical district of Al-Balad. The stadium is set to be one of four major landmarks of the Jeddah Central Project, the other three being a Museum, an Opera House, and an Oceanarium.

=== Post-2034 ===
Following the 2034 World Cup, the stadium is expected to serve as the home for two professional football clubs and host other sporting events.

== See also ==
- List of football stadiums in Saudi Arabia
