= Falcons Flight =

Roller coaster at Six Flags Qiddiya City, Saudi Arabia

- Falcons Flight's 534-foot-tall (163 m) camelback hill

Six Flags Qiddiya City
- Location: Six Flags Qiddiya City
- Park section: City of Thrills
- Coordinates: 24°35′15″N 46°20′0″E
- Status: Operating
- Soft opening date: December 30, 2025
- Opening date: December 31, 2025

General statistics
- Type: Steel – Launched
- Manufacturer: Intamin
- Model: Exa coaster
- Lift/launch system: LSM
- Height: 163 m (534.8 ft)
- Drop: 158 m (518.4 ft)
- Length: 4,250 m (13,943.6 ft)
- Speed: 250 km/h (155.3 mph)
- Inversions: 0
- Duration: 3:35
- Max vertical angle: 90°
- Height restriction: 130 cm (4 ft 3 in)
- Website: Official website
- Elevation change: ~195 m (640 ft)
- Trains: 6 trains with 4 cars each. Riders are arranged 2 across in 2 rows, except for the lead car's single row, for a total of 14 riders per train.
- GoFast Pass Available
- Falcons Flight at RCDB

Falcons Flight (Note: Arabic: رحلة الصقر (romanized: Riḥlat al-Ṣaqr)) is a launched roller coaster located at Six Flags Qiddiya City in Qiddiya City, Riyadh Province, Saudi Arabia. Manufactured by Intamin, the steel coaster opened on December 31, 2025, as the tallest, fastest, and longest roller coaster in the world surpassing Top Thrill 2, Formula Rossa, and Steel Dragon 2000, respectively. Featuring a height of 163 m (535 ft) and an elevation change of 195 m (640 ft), Falcons Flight opened as the world's first exa coaster.

== History ==
=== Conception ===
On April 7, 2017, Crown Prince Mohammed bin Salman officially announced the Qiddiya City mega project, an entertainment, sport, and cultural destination designed to diversify Saudi Arabia's economy as part of the Saudi Vision 2030 initiative. Included in the announcement was the involvement of the original Six Flags theme park chain, which at the time was also pursuing the development of international parks in Dubai and China. The Saudi Press Agency reported in October 2018 that the Crown Prince had met with David McKillip – then Six Flags' senior vice president of international park operations – at the Future Investment Initiative conference in Riyadh.

Details for Six Flags Qiddiya were formally revealed on August 26, 2019, with the park slated to open in early 2023. Included was Falcons Flight, a roller coaster that would claim the world records for tallest, fastest, and longest roller coaster in the world. An animated reel was released depicting a theoretical idea of what Falcons Flight could ultimately look like, which proposed scaling the nearby cliffs and interacting with the to-be-built F1 race track.

=== Industry involvement ===
By January 2020, it was confirmed that manufacturers had been selected for all of the park's attractions, with geotechnical testing and analysis taking place on the cliffside. In January 2021, Liechtenstein-based ride manufacturer Intamin announced that they had begun the design process for Falcons Flight; project manager Lukas Spieldiener would later allude to development having begun as far back as 2017. Two years later, in January 2023, Swiss electronics firm Indrivetec AG affirmed that they were working on the launch propulsion system for a coaster with a "world speed record of more than 240 km/h (150 mph)".

At the 2023 IAAPA Expo in Orlando, Florida, Intamin revealed further details on Falcons Flight. One of the coaster's lead cars was presented and displayed on November 14, and an updated animation was released of the finalized coaster design. The final layout eschewed an Immelmann inversion and cliffside tunnel that were included in the original concept, but otherwise remained consistent with the vision in scale and design. Daniel Schoppen – the firm's Vice President of design and development – described Falcons Flight as “the roller coaster evolution of the century”.

=== Construction ===
Construction took place concurrently with the park. For Six Flags as a whole, Qiddiya Investment Company (QIC) awarded a SAR3.75 billion (USD $998.2 million) joint contract in December 2021 to Bouygues Bâtiment International and Saudi Almabani General Contractors. In September 2022, Intamin sought to hire a project manager "based in Riyadh for about 2 years (possibly more)."

Installation continued in phases over the next year and a half, with the first launch hill and then final turnaround being erected. Intamin announced in December 2024 that some weeks prior, the final track piece had been fitted into place on top of the drop, just over the edge of the cliff.

== Ride experience ==
After dispatching from the station, the train makes a turn to the right before being launched upward at 24 miles per hour (39 km/h) before dropping down a 180-foot-tall (55 m) twisted drop into a set of airtime hills, turns, and a wave turn. The train is then launched up the Tuwaiq cliffs to a speed of 99.4 miles per hour (160.0 km/h). After the launch, the train traverses a series of turns and hills at the top of the cliffs, including an outer-banked turn over the edge. Afterwards, the train is slowed down by brakes at the edge of the cliff before dropping at an angle of 90 degrees into a tunnel. Exiting the tunnel, riders reach the ride's third launch, accelerating to a top speed of 155 miles per hour (249 km/h), the fastest of any coaster in the world. Riders then ascend a 534-foot-tall (163 m) camelback hill followed by a series of hills and turns, passing by the City Speed Park Track as well as diving underneath the bridge at the entrance along the way. Following this section, the train reaches the final brake run and makes a right turn into the station, ending the ride.

== Characteristics ==
=== Statistics ===
Falcons Flight's front car as seen at the IAAPA Expo 2023

Falcons Flight uses the natural cliffs near the park to attain a peak elevation change of approximately 195 m (640 ft) throughout the course of the ride. Its height, which is the maximum distance between the structure and the ground directly below that structure, is 163 m (534.8 ft) measured at ride's largest camelback, which also features a 158-metre (518.4 ft) drop. Its track is 4,250 m (13,940 ft) long, and the coaster reaches a top speed of 250 km/h (155.3 mph) The coaster's footprint is large enough that it can be viewed from space.

The coaster runs with six trains, each of which seat fourteen riders across four cars in rows of two; the front car only has a single row while the others each have two. Falcons Flight's station features a dual loading bay, with two separate tracks and platforms to increase throughput.

Falcons Flight utilizes three linear synchronous motor (LSM) launches, each of which propels the train to sequentially higher speeds. The second launch ascending the cliffside accelerates riders to just over 160 km/h (99.4 mph), while the final launch on the descent aids the train in achieving its maximum speed. The launches are made up of more than 700 LSM modules, about six times the amount used on VelociCoaster at Universal Islands of Adventure, another launched roller coaster constructed by Intamin.

=== Design ===
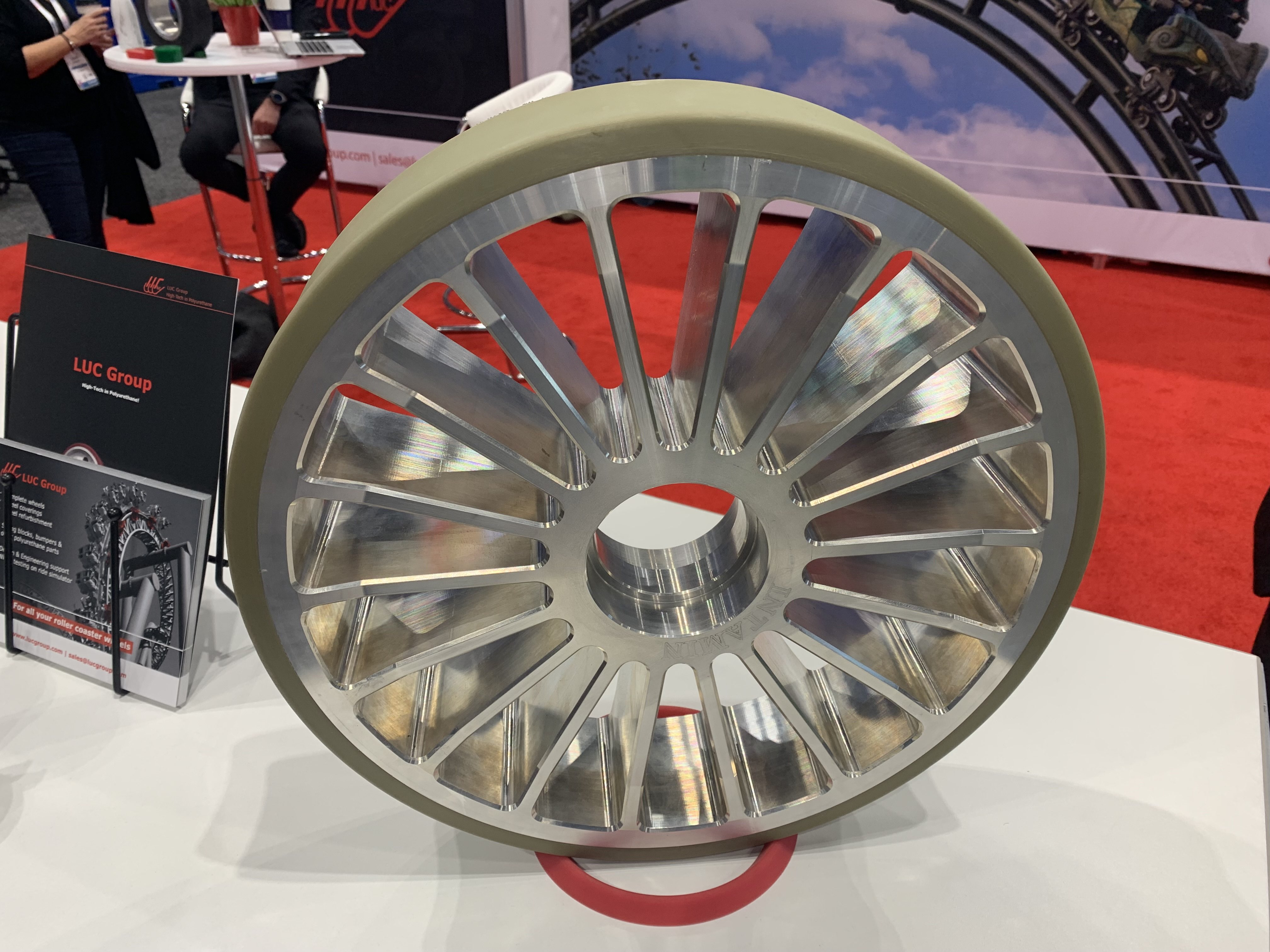
A custom wheel manufactured by LUC Group for Falcons Flight

Falcons Flight – dubbed by Intamin as an Exa Coaster – has been designed to withstand both the high speeds incurred and harsh desert climate. The trains feature lap bars and curved windshields at the front of each car, protecting riders from airborne sand at high speeds. The train's chassis is fully machined with no welding involved and includes rims designed to improve cooling. The wheels were custom designed for the coaster, measuring 16 inches (41 cm) in diameter and being among the largest ever committed to a coaster (although marginally smaller than those found on Top Thrill 2 at Cedar Point). Falcons Flight's trains also include thirty-five programmable and individually controllable light modules, allowing for enhanced spectator visibility at night.

== Awards ==
Golden Ticket Awards: Top steel Roller Coasters
Year									1998	1999
Ranking									–	–
Year	2000	2001	2002	2003	2004	2005	2006	2007	2008	2009
Ranking	–	–	–	–	–	–	–	–	–	–
Year	2010	2011	2012	2013	2014	2015	2016	2017	2018	2019
Ranking	–	–	–	–	–	–	–	–	–	–
Year	2020	2021	2022	2023	2024	2025	2026			
Ranking	N/A	–	–	–	–	–	22			

== Notes ==
Preceded by Top Thrill 2	World's Tallest Complete Circuit Roller Coaster; December 31, 2025 – present	Current holder
Preceded by Top Thrill 2	World's Tallest Roller Coaster; December 31, 2025 – present	Current holder
Preceded by Steel Dragon 2000	World's Longest Roller Coaster; December 31, 2025 – present	Current holder
Preceded by Formula Rossa	World's Fastest Roller Coaster; December 31, 2025 – present	Current holder
