= Climate change in Saudi Arabia =

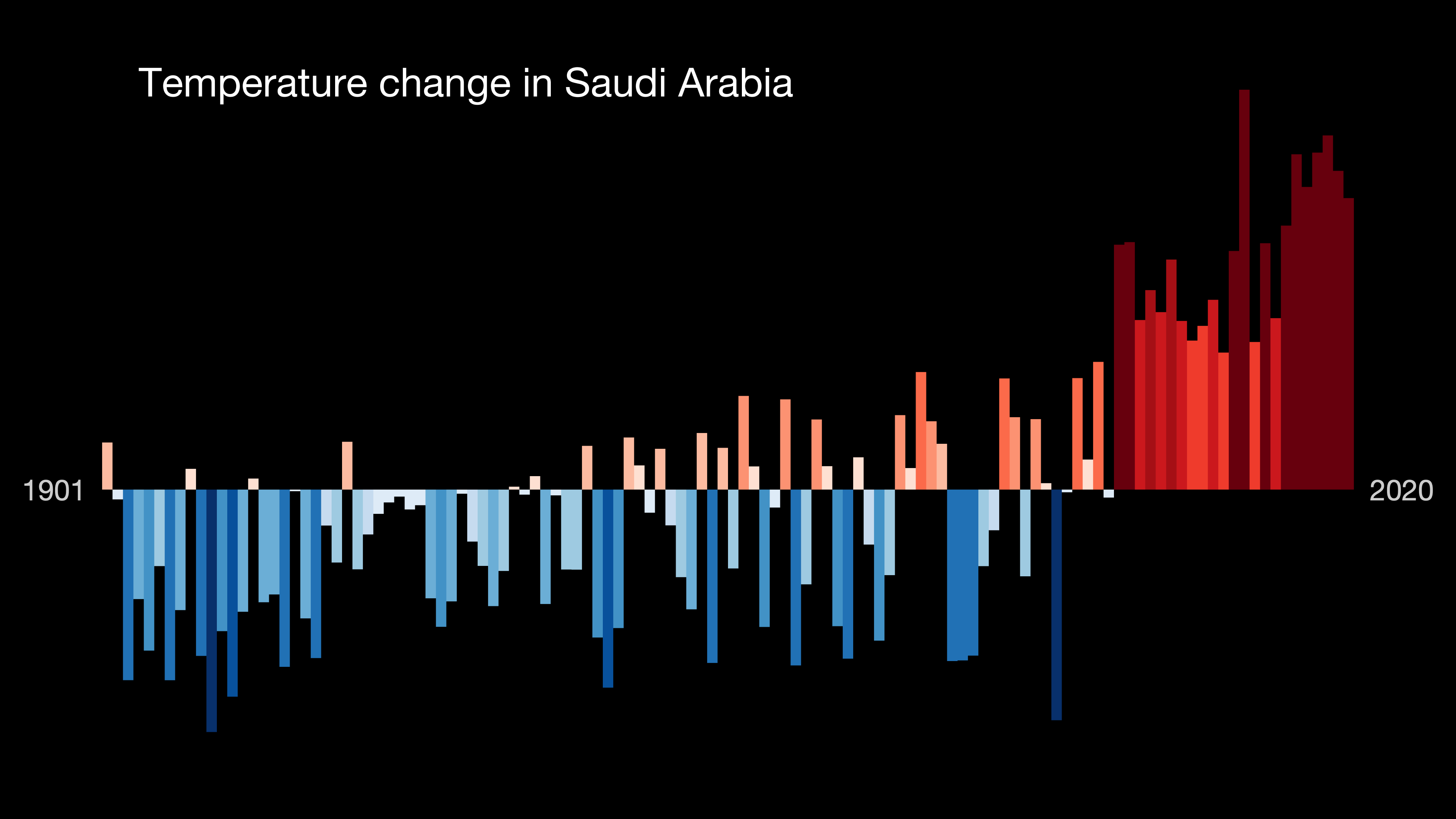
Temperature change in Saudi Arabia (1901–2020)

Climate change is having significant and diverse impacts, like higher temperatures, lower precipitation and sea level rise on Saudi Arabia's environment, society and economy. agricultural, fishing and tourism industries. Saudi Arabia is the fourth largest consumer of oil in the world, even as it is the 20th largest economy and 41st largest population.

Saudi Arabia is located in the Persian Gulf region in West Asia. The Kingdom of Saudi Arabia comprises about four-fifths (80%) of the Arabian Peninsula. It is bordered on the west by the Red Sea; on the east by the Arabian Gulf. Almost two thirds of the country is arid steppe and mountains. Most of the remaining land is sand desert. Climate change is likely to have adverse effects on sensitive ecosystems especially due to impacts on desertification processes. Between 2007 and 2021, Saudi Arabia saw its population increase by more than 40% from 25.18 million to 35.45 million people and it has continued to grow further to 36.5 million in 2023. The population increase is likely to increase energy demand, and thus, greenhouse gas emissions.

Saudi Arabia has made pledges to become net zero, as well as made other clean energy goals. Scholars have expressed doubts about Saudi climate pledges due to the Saudi regime's track record of noncompliance with its prior climate goals and the extensive dependence of the Saudi economy on fossil fuels. Saudi Arabia signed and ratified the Paris Treaty. In 2021, it updated its First Nationally Determined Contributions, with a focus on economic diversification of its economy, reducing and avoiding greenhouse gas emissions (GHGs). Efforts to reduce the extent of climate change could be problematic for the oil and gas sector of its economy given that fossil fuels produce more than 70% of the world's total greenhouse gas emissions, reducing their use an international priority.

== Greenhouse gas emissions ==
Saudi Arabia controls about 18% of the world's total known petroleum reserves and is the largest exporter for oil. Saudi Arabia is also one of the largest users of fossil fuels for its economy: In 2017, it used an average of 3,328,000 barrels per day, placing it sixth in global use of fuel. It was also high on the list for electricity usage with its 295 billion kWh making it thirteenth in the world. The majority of Saudi Arabia's greenhouse gas emissions are produced by its electricity, transportation and manufacturing sectors. In 2019, its carbon dioxide emissions was 559.6 million tons. Due to its quickly growing population which is accompanied by increased electricity demand and expansion of the manufacturing sector, energy demand is continuing to rise and with it so are greenhouse gas emissions. Indeed, the nation's gross domestic product rose by about 45% and electricity used per capita rose by 1.378 MWh, further contributing to its emissions.

== Impacts on the natural environment ==
=== Temperature and weather changes ===
From 1979 to 2019, Saudi Arabia has seen its mean temperature increase by 2.1 °C which is nearly three times more than the world average. The increase has been even more dramatic in the summer months as the mean temperature has increased by 2.5 °C. Because of climate change, there has been a global rise in extreme weather events such as the record heatwaves in the summer of 2010. During this period, the Saudi Arabian city of Jeddah saw temperatures reach 52 °C, causing eight of the nation's power stations to shutdown with multiple cities suffering from blackouts. The overall increase in temperature disproportionately affects the country and is dependent on seasons. For instance, the nation's capital, Riyadh saw increases in its average summer temperature increase by 0.067 °C per year between 2009 and 2013 while its winter averages increased by 0.056 °C per year. On the other hand, Tabuk in the north-west saw slightly more gradual increases during the same period with its summer average increasing by 0.058 °C per year and its winter temperatures increasing by 0.042 °C per year. This reflects the overall regional trends in Saudi Arabia of lower temperatures in the north and higher temperatures in the coastal and central parts of the country.

=== Sea level rise ===
Climate change and the rising temperatures that accompany it lead to the melting of ice and expansion of ocean water. The combination of these processes manifests in the form of rising sea levels, threatening coastal and island nations throughout the world. Saudi Arabia's coastal regions are densely populated and these regions are also important for the economy. Along the country's Red Sea coast are the four major cities of Tabuk, Al Madinah, Jeddah and Jizan. These areas are home to a number of religious and historical sites that are important tourist attractions and they also host agricultural land and oil and natural gas deposits. Sea level rise anywhere can be accompanied by a range of negative environmental consequences. These include flooding in coastal areas, erosion of beaches, contamination of freshwater sources, salinization of soils, and loss of habitats along coasts. Areas to the north and south of Dammam are at the highest risk of inundation in the country and, therefore, are threatened by the accompanying environmental impacts.

=== Water resources ===
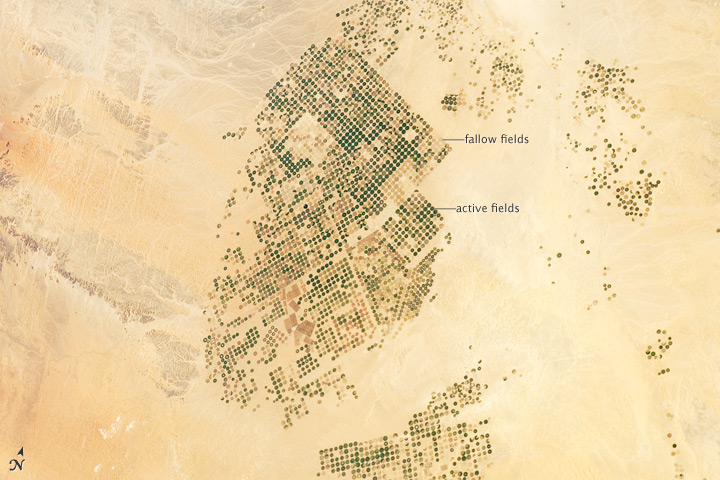
NASA Earth observatory image of irrigation systems in Wadi As-Sirhan, Tawil Quaternary Aquifer system

Saudi Arabia is a semi-arid nation with limited groundwater resources and no natural rivers or lakes. High temperatures and low rainfall of less than 100mm per year cause the few surface water resources that exist to be unable to meet the nation's needs due to the rate of evaporation being higher than the rate of precipitation. Aridity has only been further driven by the fact that the thermostatic effect from the oceans has shifted the thermal equator. Groundwater, makes up between 80 and 90 percent of water use in Saudi Arabia and comes from both nonrenewable fossil reservoirs and renewable shallow terrestrial aquifers. There are eight aquifers that account for approximately 86% of the non-renewable water while the other 14% is contained within the rest of the secondary aquifers. These aquifers are mostly in the northern and central parts of the country. Because fossil water is non-renewable and the renewable shallow aquifers are being extracted from faster than they can recharge, it is estimated that the reserves of groundwater will runout in under 50 years should the current rates of extraction continue.

=== Ecosystems ===
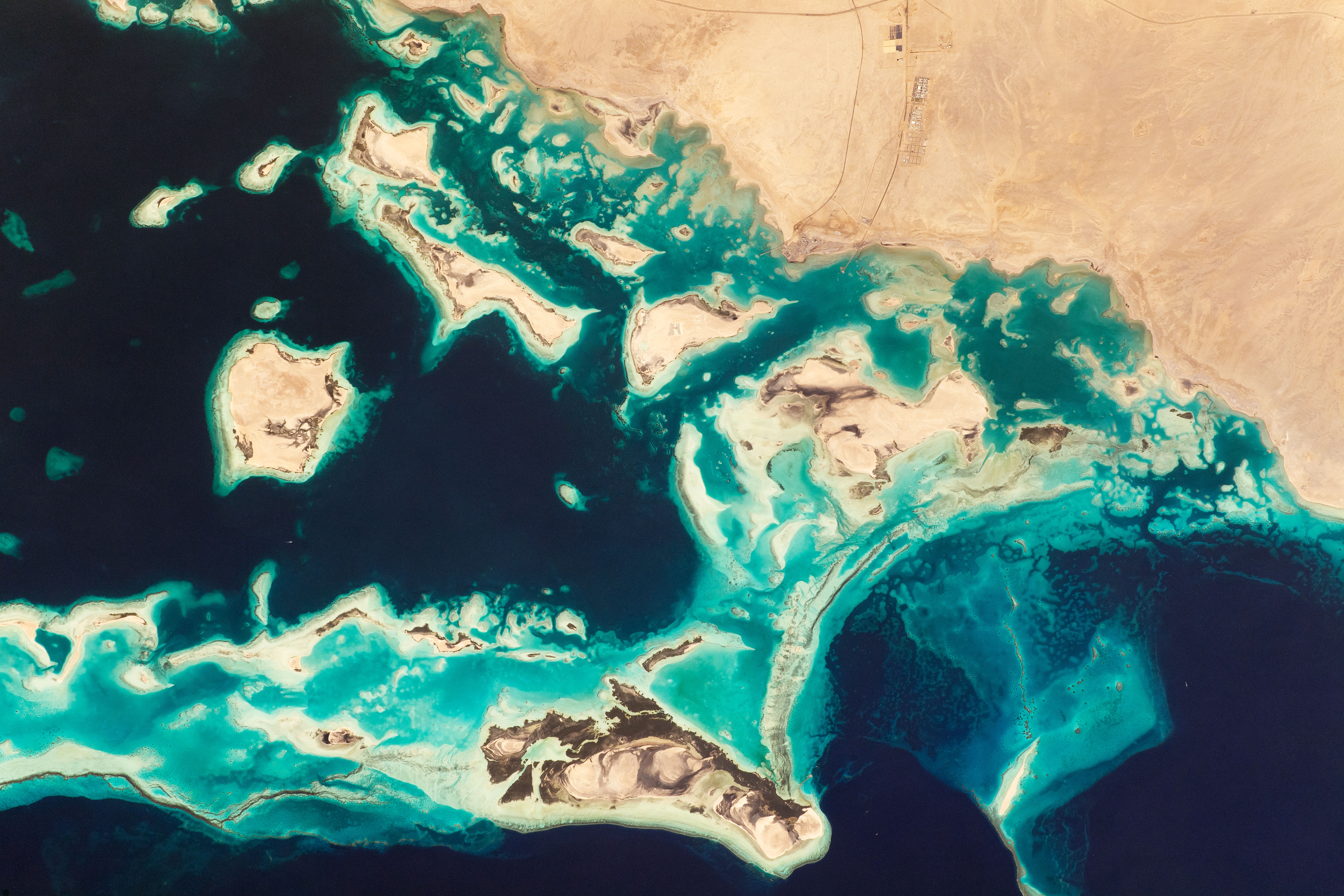
Red sea rainforests from space

Within Saudi Arabia exist some of the most species rich and productive marine habitats in the world in the form of its coastal wetlands. These ecosystems bolster the regional fisheries and house breeding bird populations. Two of the ways in which climate change impacts the wetlands is through the rising temperatures and falling quantities of precipitation which alter wetland hydrology and ecological community compositions. An additional threat imposed by climate change is sea level rise which, when combined with anthropomorphic activities like land development and pollution, make wetlands like mangroves and mudflats the most threatened ecosystems within the country. In the Khulais region, located within the Arabian Shield along the western side of the country, it has been found that the abundance of many of the native species has been declining while presence of invasive species has been on the rise. This is likely a direct result of the increasing temperatures and the reduced levels of precipitation that lower the availability of water in the nation. So, not only is climate change negatively impacting Saudi Arabian ecosystems with its reduction of water resources but also with its facilitation of the growth of harmful invasive species.

== Impacts on people ==
The effects of climate change present a host of challenges for public health. The increases in the prevalence of heat stroke and heat-related illnesses in the region are attributable to rising temperatures associated with climate change. The combined threats of deteriorating air quality, desertification, and diminishing water resources are of immediate concern to both human health and livelihoods. Farmers predict a significant decrease in their annual yield, which is dependent on increasingly strained irrigation systems, a consequence that simultaneously reinforces the country's dependence on food imports and endangers the well-being of vulnerable populations in terms of both food security and economic stability. Due to the prevalence of insect and pest infestation alone, agriculture in Saudi Arabia faces 12.6-20% yield loss annually. These challenges worsen food insecurity, an increasingly pressing issue due to the country's rapid population growth.

Saudi Arabia's air quality ranks among the most polluted in the world and is found to lower the population's average lifespan. Additionally, the change in temperature, humidity, and precipitation create an environment more conducive to mosquitoes and the spread of mosquito-borne illnesses. Compared to other nations in the Gulf Cooperation Council, Saudi Arabia is the only country with recorded increases in the mortality rate attributable to the air's concentration of particulate matter. Air pollutants in the region contribute to the increased risk and prevalence of chronic obstructive pulmonary diseases and ischemic heart diseases in Saudi Arabia.

== Mitigation ==
One of the critical issues in the Updated Nationally Determined Contributions of Saudi Arabia is economic diversification. Economic diversification involves broadening the country's main sources of income, which is heavily emphasized for oil-exporting nations that will be subject to the detriments of the volatile oil market. The fluctuation of crude oil prices exacerbates Saudi Arabia's vulnerability to inflationary pressures and facilitates economic instability.

When it held the G20 presidency, Saudi Arabia introduced the circular carbon economy (CCE) as a strategy to reduce its greenhouse gas emissions. The model of CCE relies on the principles of reduce, reuse, recycle - accomplishing a decrease in carbon emissions through the management of carbon as a product input or through carbon capture. Further, Saudi Arabia began reform of energy pricing to reduce subsidies that promote excess energy consumption and disincentivize more sustainable energy sources. To shield lower income households from the detriments of price increases, Saudi Arabia implemented a form of government assistance known as the Citizens' Account. Moreover, the Saudi government introduced Vision 2030 in 2016, and set several sustainability goals to be achieved by 2030. This project continued with the introduction of the Saudi Green Initiative in 2021. Current initiatives focus on afforestation, conservation, and the implementation of sustainable practices in the private and public sectors.

== Adaptation ==
The projected growth in population and the nation's economy necessitate adaptation in sectors such as transportation, electricity, and agriculture. Rising temperatures exacerbate concerns surrounding energy waste, primarily as the region's cooling needs continue to rise. Saudi Arabia faces the task of adaption as the introduction of CCE and energy price reforms place stress on the industrial sector and create a need for carbon-neutral alternatives. The country is investing in solar and wind energy projects intending to generate half of its energy from renewables by 2030 to reduce its reliance on oil. Saudi Arabia seeks to address growing concerns through a reimagined urban planning that allocates for more efficient transportation and the creation of green spaces.

== Society and culture ==
The impacts of climate change have shifted the livelihoods of those in Saudi Arabia. Farmers are increasingly worried about the viability of their crops, which led to shifts to more sustainable crops and altered irrigation methods in response to water shortages. Alongside the endangerment of traditional livelihoods, climate change impacts the preservation and accessibility of important cultural heritage sites. The culmination of climate change impacts has taken a toll on the country's rates of mental illness, with depression and anxiety rising to the leading causes of disability. Water pollution onset by unsustainable practices, along with salinity and acidity changes, has impacted the livelihoods of fishermen and the operation of fisheries. The disruptions to this industry pose a threat to the culture of fish consumption in Saudi Arabia and present the potential for job loss in traditional lines of work. The tangible effects of climate change in the region have become a problem for the country's tourism industry, as the increase in temperature poses health risks to tourists. In Saudi Arabia, much of the concern surrounds the barriers to religious tourism to Mecca and Medina, which are culturally and spiritually salient.

== International cooperation ==
Cooperation between the Kingdom of Saudi Arabia and the United Nations through the United Nations Sustainable Development Cooperation Framework with the Kingdom of Saudi Arabia 2022-2026 (UNSDCF) allows the country to abide by the UN's 2030 Agenda. The framework focuses on policy advising and supporting efforts toward poverty alleviation, economic growth, and sustainable resource consumption. Saudi Arabia is a contributor to the development of Nigeria's carbon market, facilitating bilateral relations in oil, agriculture, and infrastructure.

Regionally, Saudi Arabia led the establishment of the Saudi and Middle East Green Initiatives to address climate change. The Middle East Green Initiative, launched by the Crown Prince, aims to reduce global carbon emissions by 10% through ambitious goals such as planting 50 billion trees, restoration of 200 million hectares of land, and achieving 50% renewable energy in electricity generation by 2030, all while fostering innovation and international collaboration to combat climate change.
