= King Khalid University Stadium =

Saudi Arabian football stadium near Abha

- Proposed design after refurbishments for the 2034 FIFA World Cup.
- Interactive map of King Khalid University Stadium
- Location: Abha, Saudi Arabia
- Coordinates: 18.0976°N 42.7206°E
- Owner: King Khalid University
- Operator: A.S. Al Sayed & Partners Contracting Co. Ltd
- Capacity: 12,000 (expanded to 45,428 for 2034 World Cup)
- Surface: Grass
- Field size: Field of play: 105m × 68m Pitch area: 125m × 85m

Construction
- Groundbreaking: 1998
- Opened: 1999
- Renovated: 2030; 4 years' time (planned)
- Reopened: 2032; 6 years' time (planned)
- Architect: Populous (refurbishments)
- Main contractor: Hashem Contracting Company

Tenants
- King Khalid University; Abha Club (planned)

The King Khalid University Stadium (Arabic: ملعب جامعة الملك خالد) is a football stadium located southeast of Abha, Saudi Arabia. It is set to be a venue for the 2034 FIFA World Cup and has a proposed capacity of 45,428 people following refurbishments, where it will host fixtures in the group stage, round of 32, and round of 16.

The stadium currently has a capacity of 12,000 spectators and is open to the King Khalid University's students and faculty. The stadium is named after former king and prime minister of Saudi Arabia, Khalid bin Abdulaziz Al Saud.

== Development ==
The King Khalid University Stadium was opened in 1999 with a capacity of 12,000 and it hosts matches for the King Khalid University FC.

=== Refurbishments ===
Refurbishments on the stadium will begin in 2030 and its re-opening will take place in 2032.

The refurbishment project will not only increase the stadium's capacity but also focus on modernizing its infrastructure while preserving its historical value. Although many changes will be temporary, permanent upgrades will include a new west stand and improved technological infrastructure. The surrounding area will also be enhanced during the competition, with additional amenities designed to handle the expected rise in visitors, creating a vibrant, efficient, and welcoming atmosphere for attendees. King Khalid University Stadium is conveniently located southeast of Abha City within the university campus. To the north, the Dalaghan Park nature reserve is within walking distance, and the campus features additional sports facilities, including a sports hall, swimming pool, and basketball courts, all close to the stadium.

=== Post-2034 ===
After the World Cup, the King Khalid University Stadium will become the permanent home of a professional football club. Furthermore, the venue will remain accessible to the university and the wider community, supporting a range of activities such as sporting events, community development initiatives, and summer training programs.

== See also ==
- List of football stadiums in Saudi Arabia
- List of things named after Saudi kings
