= Hybrid grass =

Natural grass surface reinforced with synthetic fibers

Hybrid grass or reinforced natural grass is a product created by combining natural lawn grass with reinforcing synthetic fibres. It is used for stadiums and training pitches used for association football, rugby, gridiron football and cricket. Reinforced natural grass can also be used for events and concerts. The synthetic fibres incorporated into the rootzone make the grass stronger and more resistant to damage.

A first generation of hybrid grass appeared in the 1990s. Grassroots were allowed to intertwine with a mix of soil and synthetic fibres as they grew. Three main methods exist to insert synthetic fibres in the root zone. The first is to inject fibres in the sand with a tufting machine.

The second method is to mix fibres, cork and sand in an automated plant and to install it afterwards on the pitch. The system was created by a laboratory at Arts et Métiers ParisTech.

The third method is to put a carpet or mat with woven or tufted fibres on the surface, then to brush in sand or sand mixes to keep the fibres in an upright position and finally to seed grass mixtures on top. The natural grassroots through the mat and stabilizes the system. These systems are called carpet-based hybrid grass solutions.
